= 2018 LA Galaxy II season =

LA Galaxy II
2018 season
- Head coach: Mike Muñoz
- Stadium: StubHub Center
- USL: Conference: 14th
- Playoffs: Did not qualify
- Top goalscorer: Frank López (13 goals)
- Highest home attendance: 1,714 (vs. Seattle Sounders FC 2 – July 1)
- Lowest home attendance: 478 (vs. Rio Grande Valley FC Toros – August 22)
- Average home league attendance: 1,049
Home colors	Away colors

The 2018 LA Galaxy II season was the club's fifth season of existence.

== Squad information ==
As of The end of the season.

No.	Position	Player	Nation
20	DF	USA	Tomas Hilliard-Arce
21	DF	USA	Hugo Arellano
26	MF	USA	Efrain Alvarez
33	DF	USA	Nate Shultz
41	GK	USA	Justin Vom Steeg
42	GK	USA	Wade Hamilton
44	MF	GHA	Geoffrey Acheampong
45	MF	GHA	Emmanuel Appiah
46	DF	USA	John Requejo
47	MF	MEX	Miguel Aguilar
49	MF	USA	Adrian Vera
50	DF	FRA	Diedie Traore
51	FW	USA	Ethan Zubak
53	MF	USA	Jorge Hernandez
54	GK	USA	Bennett Sneddon
57	FW	USA	Justin Dhillon
58	FW	USA	Ulysses Llanez
60	FW	USA	Alex Méndez
62	DF	USA	Jake Arteaga
65	DF	USA	Ian Lonergan
66	FW	CUB	Frank López
67	MF	USA	Jonathan Hernandez
68	MF	CMR	Andre Ulrich Zanga
69	DF	USA	Justin Fiddes
69	DF	GUA	Jeffrey Payeras
72	DF	CMR	Jean Jospin Engola
73	FW	USA	Adonis Amaya
74	MF	USA	Taylor Davila
75	GK	USA	Eric Lopez

Signed to first team contract with LA Galaxy.
LA Galaxy Academy player.

=== Transfers ===
==== Transfers in ====
Pos.	Player	Transferred from	Fee/notes	Date	Source
MF	(Ghana) Geoffrey Acheampong	(Mexico) Veracruz	Sign.	March 1, 2018	
DF	(United States) Nate Shultz	(United States) Akron Zips	Selected by LA Galaxy with the 48th pick in the 2018 MLS SuperDraft.	March 8, 2018	
DF	(United States) John Requejo	(Mexico) Tijuana	Sign.	March 13, 2018	
MF	(Ghana) Emmanuel Appiah	(United States) Saint Louis FC	Sign.	March 14, 2018	
GK	(United States) Wade Hamilton	(United States) Portland Timbers 2	Sign.	March 14, 2018	
MF	(Germany) Julian Büscher	(United States) D.C. United	Sign.	March 15, 2018	
FW	(Cuba) Frank López	(United States) Miami Soccer Academy	Sign.	March 15, 2018	
DF	(France) Diedie Traore		Tryout winner.	July 25, 2018	
DF	(United States) Justin Fiddes	(Canada) Vancouver Whitecaps FC	Sign.	August 8, 2018	

==== Transfers out ====
Pos.	Player	Transferred to	Fee/notes	Date	Source
MF	(Hong Kong) Ryo Fujii	(Sweden) Nyköpings BIS	Contract option declined.	December 4, 2017	
MF	(United States) Alejandro Covarrubias	(United States) Fresno FC	Contract option declined.	December 4, 2017	
DF	(United States) Tyler Turner		Contract option declined.	December 4, 2017	
DF	(United States) Robert Castellanos	(United States) Rio Grande Valley FC Toros	Contract option declined.	December 4, 2017	
DF	(United States) Josh Turnley	(United States) Sacramento Republic FC	Contract expired.	December 4, 2017	
GK	(United States) Justin Vom Steeg	(United States) LA Galaxy	Sign.	March 1, 2018	
MF	(United States) Efrain Alvarez	(United States) LA Galaxy	Sign.	March 4, 2018	
MF	(Germany) Julian Büscher		Mutually parted ways.	August 8, 2018	

== Competitions ==
=== Friendlies ===
February 21	LA Galaxy II	4–1	Cal State Northridge Matadors	Carson, California
	Aguilar (?); Dhillon (?)	Report		Stadium: StubHub Center

February 25	LA Galaxy II	5–1	UC Riverside Highlanders	Carson, California
		Report		Stadium: StubHub Center

March 3	LA Galaxy II	3–0	Orange County SC	Carson, California
11:00	Llanez (?); Acheampong (?) ? (?)	Report		Stadium: StubHub Center

March 10	LA Galaxy II	3–1	UC Irvine Anteaters	Carson, California
11:00	(?) (?) (?)	Report	(?)	Stadium: StubHub Center

=== USL ===
==== Standings ====
Pos	Team	Pld	W	D	L	GF	GA	GD	Pts
12	Fresno FC	34	9	12	13	44	38	+6	39
13	Rio Grande Valley Toros	34	8	14	12	36	42	−6	38
14	LA Galaxy II	34	10	7	17	60	67	−7	37
15	Las Vegas Lights FC	34	8	7	19	50	74	−24	31
16	Seattle Sounders FC 2	34	6	7	21	40	71	−31	25

Source: 2018 USL standings
Rules for classification: 1) total wins; 2) total goal differential; 3) total goals scored; 4) points earned against top four Conference finishers; 5) disciplinary points; 6) coin toss or drawing of lots

==== Regular season ====
The first two matches of the 2018 season was announced on January 12, 2018. The full schedule was released on January 19, 2018.

Win Draw Loss Postponed

All times in Pacific Time Zone.

March 17 1	Colorado Springs Switchbacks	2–0	LA Galaxy II	Colorado Springs, Colorado
17:00	Ajeakwa 25'; Burt 55'; Schweitzer (yellow card) 57'; Kim Tae-seong (yellow card) 75'	Report	Arellano (yellow card) 57'; Hilliard-Arce (yellow card) 58'	Stadium: Weidner Field; Attendance: 3,023; Referee: Greg Dopka

March 24 2	Fresno FC	1–1	LA Galaxy II	Fresno, California
19:00	Cooper 75'	Report	Appiah 3'; Dhillon (red card) 24'; Büscher (yellow card) 51'	Stadium: Chukchansi Park; Attendance: 6,128; Referee: Vincent Apple-Chiarella

March 31 3	LA Galaxy II	0–0	San Antonio FC	Carson, California
15:30	Requejo (yellow card) 41'; López (yellow card) 62'; Vera (yellow card) 78'; Appiah (yellow card) 90+1'	Report	Lopez (yellow card) 19' (yellow-red card) 77'; Tyrpak (yellow card) 71'; King (yellow card) 90+3'	Stadium: StubHub Center; Attendance: 1,123; Referee: Victor Rivas

April 7 4	Orange County SC	3–0	LA Galaxy II	Irvine, California
19:00	Segbers 45', 58'; Powder (yellow card) 56'; Enevoldsen (yellow card) 71'; Juel-Nielsen (yellow card) 82'; Seaton (yellow card) 84'; Selbol 88', (yellow card) 89'	Report	Engola (red card) 30'; Méndez (red card) 54'; García (yellow card) 83'	Stadium: Champions Soccer Stadium; Attendance: 3,056; Referee: Mark Allatin

April 11 5	LA Galaxy II	0–1	Phoenix Rising FC	Carson, California
19:30	Acheampong (yellow card) 31'; Büscher (yellow card) 90+4'	Report	Drogba 64' da Fonte (yellow card) 90+2'	Stadium: StubHub Center; Attendance: 1,236; Referee: Alejandro Mariscal

April 14 6	Saint Louis FC	1–0	LA Galaxy II	Fenton, Missouri
17:30	Calistri 46'	Report	Büscher (yellow card) 83'	Stadium: Toyota Stadium; Attendance: 4,006; Referee: Don Tebeau

April 22 7	LA Galaxy II	1–1	New York Red Bulls II	Carson, California
17:30	Llanez 35'; Lassiter (yellow card) 39'; João Pedro (yellow card) 60'	Report	Scarlett (yellow card) 13'; Moreno 78'; Cásseres Jr. (yellow card) 90+3'	Stadium: StubHub Center; Attendance: 1,131; Referee: Ramy Touchan

May 4 8	Phoenix Rising FC	4–3	LA Galaxy II	Scottsdale, Arizona
18:30	Johnson 21', 71'; Riggi 47'; Drogba 78' (pen.)	Report	Alvarez 19'; Llanez 26'; Arellano 40', (yellow card) 56'	Stadium: Phoenix Rising FC Soccer Complex; Attendance: 7,332; Referee: Ismir Pekmic

May 9 9	LA Galaxy II	6–3	Saint Louis FC	Carson, California
19:30	Zubak 14', 70', 90+4'; Alvarez 18', 47', 75'; Appiah (yellow card) 90'	Report	Dacres (yellow card) 32'; Dikwa 39'; Calistri (yellow card) 64'; Greig 67', 87', (yellow card) 70'	Stadium: StubHub Center; Attendance: 858; Referee: Daniel Radford

May 18 10	Portland Timbers 2	7–3	LA Galaxy II	Portland, Oregon
11:00	Langsdorf 25', 43', 57' (pen.); Loría (yellow card) 58', (goal) 90+1'; Tuiloma (yellow card) 80'; Williamson 81'; Lewis (yellow card) 87'; Arboleda 90+4'; Williams 90+5'	Report	Aguilar (yellow card) 47', (goal) 59'; Alvarez 49', 68'; Appiah (yellow card) 90+1'	Stadium: Providence Park; Attendance: 5,857; Referee: Mike Hohnholz

May 23 11	Rio Grande Valley FC Toros	1–1	LA Galaxy II	Edinburg, Texas
17:00	Quintanilla 14'; Zaldívar (yellow card) 65'; Enríquez (yellow card) 69'; Wharton (yellow card) 72'; Montaño (yellow card) 90+1'	Report	Büscher (yellow card) 5'; Requejo (yellow card) 21'; F. López 87'	Stadium: H-E-B Park; Attendance: 4,794; Referee: Malik Badawi

May 26 12	LA Galaxy II	7–2	Las Vegas Lights FC	Carson, California
19:30	Zubak 10', 16', 18', 54', (yellow card) 17'; Jamieson IV (yellow card) 28'; Lassiter 60', 89'; Büscher 87'	Report	Kobayashi 7', 22'; Torres (yellow card) 38'; Jaime (yellow card) 41'	Stadium: StubHub Center; Attendance: 1,215; Referee: Michael Radchuk

June 2 13	LA Galaxy II	1–0	Tulsa Roughnecks FC	Carson, California
19:30	Aguilar 6'; Büscher (yellow card) 30' (yellow-red card) 77'; Zubak (yellow card) 32'; Hernandez (yellow card) 69'; Llanez (yellow card) 88'	Report	Levin (yellow card) 34'; Ugarte (yellow card) 83'	Stadium: StubHub Center; Attendance: 594; Referee: Mark Allatin

June 10 14	LA Galaxy II	0–1	Orange County SC	Carson, California
17:30	Aguilar (yellow card) 44'; Appiah (yellow card) 62'	Report	Enevoldsen 82'	Stadium: StubHub Center; Attendance: 1,313; Referee: Farhad Dadkho

June 23 15	OKC Energy FC	1–0	LA Galaxy II	Oklahoma City, Oklahoma
17:30	Siaj (yellow card) 45+5'; Volesky 90'	Report	Zanga (yellow card) 56'	Stadium: Taft Stadium; Attendance: 4,015; Referee: Lorant Varga

June 27 16	Tulsa Roughnecks FC	2–0	LA Galaxy II	Tulsa, Oklahoma
17:30	Mirković (yellow card) 26'; Pírez 40'; Rivas (yellow card) 43'; Gee 52'; Levin (yellow card) 83'	Report	Büscher (yellow card) 44'; Arellano (red card) 46'; Requejo (yellow card) 65'	Stadium: ONEOK Field; Attendance: 3,124; Referee: Fotis Bazakos

July 1 17	LA Galaxy II	5–3	Seattle Sounders FC 2	Carson, California
17:30	Acheampong 26'; F. López 28', (yellow card) 51'; Alvarez 49', 62'; Méndez 60'	Report	Daley (yellow card) 3', (goal) 45'; Saari 14', (yellow card) 40'; Alfaro (yellow card) 34'; Ulysse (yellow card) 59'; Estrada 80'	Stadium: StubHub Center; Attendance: 1,714; Referee: Joseph Salinas

July 7 18	Orange County SC	0–3	LA Galaxy II	Irvine, California
19:00	Crognale (yellow card) 41'	Report	Zubak 3'; Acheampong (yellow card) 15' (yellow-red card) 45+1'; López 23'; Hernandez 52'; Sylvestre (yellow card) 62'	Stadium: Champions Soccer Stadium; Attendance: 3,246; Referee: Alfredo Sandoval-Victorio

July 11 19	LA Galaxy II	1–4	Reno 1868 FC	Carson, California
19:30	Büscher (yellow card) 21'; Engola (yellow card) 46'; Dhillon 57'	Report	Hoppenot 7' van Ewijk 33', 80'; Wehan 47'; Calvillo (yellow card) 52'	Stadium: StubHub Center; Attendance: 1,133; Referee: Alejandro Mariscal

July 28 20	LA Galaxy II	3–4	Portland Timbers 2	Carson, California
13:00	Zubak 1'; Dhillon 11'; Zanga (yellow card) 26'; Acheampong (yellow card) 33'; López 78'	Report	Ebobisse 3'; Williamson 23'; Langsdorf 54', 63', (yellow card) 86'; Loría (yellow card) 61'; McIntosh (yellow card) 90'	Stadium: StubHub Center; Attendance: 833; Referee: Ceciah Valero

August 1 21	LA Galaxy II	1–1	Swope Park Rangers	Carson, California
19:30	López 60'; Vera (yellow card) 64'; Hilliard-Arce (yellow card) 77'	Report	Barry 51', (yellow card) 73' (yellow-red card) 86'; Smith (yellow card) 54'; Rebellón (yellow card) 81'	Stadium: StubHub Center; Attendance: 801; Referee: Mark Allatin

August 4 22	San Antonio FC	2–1	LA Galaxy II	San Antonio, Texas
17:30	King 20'; Guzmán 50'; Lopez (yellow card) 69'; Hedrick (yellow card) 73'	Report	Büscher (yellow card) 63'; Zanga (yellow card) 76'; Hernandez (yellow card) 90+2'; López 90+4'	Stadium: Toyota Field; Attendance: 7,447; Referee: Greg Dopka

August 9 23	LA Galaxy II	2–1	Fresno FC	Carson, California
19:30	López 50', 72', (yellow card) 86'; Vera (yellow card) 53'; Zubak (yellow card) 90+1'	Report	Del Campo (yellow card) 64'; Chaney 90+2', (yellow card) 90+6'	Stadium: StubHub Center; Attendance: 706; Referee: Daniel Radford

August 18 24	Sacramento Republic FC	1–4	LA Galaxy II	Sacramento, California
20:00	Requejo 56' (o.g.); Iwasa (yellow card) 75'; Alemán (yellow card) 75'	Report	Aguilar 7'; Zubak 20' (pen.); Engola 25'; López 41', (yellow card) 80'; Requejo (yellow card) 77'	Stadium: Papa Murphy's Park; Attendance: 11,569; Referee: Ismir Pekmic

August 22 25	LA Galaxy II	1–1	Rio Grande Valley FC Toros	Carson, California
19:30	Engola (yellow card) 18'; Aguilar (yellow card) 28'; Dhillon 77'	Report	Sullivan (yellow card) 38'; Enríquez 51'	Stadium: StubHub Center; Attendance: 478; Referee: Alejandro Mariscal

August 25 26	Real Monarchs	4–0	LA Galaxy II	Herriman, Utah
19:00	Chang 20'; Adams 33', (yellow card) 65'; Hoffman 36', 40'	Report	Vera (yellow card) 85'	Stadium: Zions Bank Stadium; Attendance: 1,707; Referee: Jose Lara

September 1 27	LA Galaxy II	3–1	Colorado Springs Switchbacks	Carson, California
19:30	Hilliard-Arce 27'; Lassiter 29', 56'; Vera (yellow card) 81'	Report	Toye 11'; També (yellow card) 45+1'	Stadium: StubHub Center; Attendance: 1,683; Referee: Tim Ford

September 8 28	Las Vegas Lights FC	1–2	LA Galaxy II	Las Vegas, Nevada
20:00	Salgado 10'; García (yellow card) 81'	Report	Aguilar (yellow card) 14'; Alvarez (yellow card) 18', (goal) 27'; Lassiter 21' (pen.); Traore (yellow card) 64'; Williams (yellow card) 82'	Stadium: Cashman Field; Attendance: 8,061; Referee: Lorant Varga

September 12 29	LA Galaxy II	1–3	OKC Energy FC	Carson, California
19:30	López 13' (pen.); Zanga (yellow card) 69'	Report	Harris (yellow card) 32'; Barril 40'; Rasmussen 72'; A. Dixon 81'; Jahn (yellow card) 88'	Stadium: StubHub Center; Attendance: 751; Referee: Michael Radchuk

September 15 30	Reno 1868 FC	1–0	LA Galaxy II	Reno, Nevada
19:00	Mfeka (yellow card) 33'; Calvillo 37'; Marie (yellow card) 67'	Report	Acheampong (yellow card) 23'	Stadium: Greater Nevada Field; Attendance: 5,060; Referee: Luis Guardia

September 22 31	LA Galaxy II	6–1	Real Monarchs	Carson, California
19:30	Zubak 18'; Vera 38'; Alvarez 49', 52', 75'; Engola (yellow card) 76'; López 86'	Report	Plewa (yellow card) 56'; Hoffman 57'; Chang (yellow card) 68'	Stadium: StubHub Center; Attendance: 1,008; Referee: Victor Rivas

October 3 32	Seattle Sounders FC 2	2–2	LA Galaxy II	Tacoma, Washington
19:00	Roldan 31'; Neagle 34'; Alfaro (yellow card) 73'	Report	Acheampong (yellow card) 26'; Appiah 39'; F. López 80'; Engola (yellow card) 84'; Araujo (yellow card) 90+3'	Stadium: Cheney Stadium; Attendance: 3,087; Referee: Sergii Demianchuk

October 6 33	LA Galaxy II	1–2	Sacramento Republic FC	Carson, California
19:30	F. López 24', (yellow card) 71'; Vera (yellow card) 45+1'	Report	Alemán 13', 21'; Turnley (yellow card) 51'; Seiler (yellow card) 62' (yellow-red card) 74'	Stadium: StubHub Center; Attendance: 1,241; Referee: Malik Badawi

October 14 34	Swope Park Rangers	5–1	LA Galaxy II	Kansas City, Kansas
14:00	Storm (yellow card) 9'; Kuzain 28'; Belmar 34'; Barry 65' (pen.); Hernandez 76'; Harris 84'	Report	Hilliard-Arce (yellow card) 27'; Hernandez 85'	Stadium: Children's Mercy Park; Attendance: 1,074; Referee: Kevin Broadley

== See also ==
- 2018 in American soccer
- 2018 LA Galaxy season
