= 2017 LA Galaxy II season =

LA Galaxy II
2017 season
- Head coach: Mike Muñoz
- Stadium: StubHub Center
- USL: Conference: 13th
- Playoffs: Did not qualify
- Top goalscorer: Justin Dhillon; Adrian Vera (6 goals each)
- Highest home attendance: 3,000 (10/7 vs. POR)
- Lowest home attendance: 432 (9/6 vs. RNO)
- Average home league attendance: 1,215
- Biggest win: LA 2–0 VAN (3/25)
- Biggest defeat: RNO 9–0 LA (7/3)
Home colors	Away colors

The 2017 LA Galaxy II season was the club's fourth season of existence. The 2017 marks the first in LA Galaxy II club history that the team did not qualify for the USL Cup playoffs.

== Players ==
The squad of LA Galaxy II is composed of an unrestricted number of first-team players on loan to the reserve team, players signed by Galaxy II, and LA Galaxy Academy players. Academy players who appear in matches with LA Galaxy II will retain their college eligibility.

=== Squad information ===
Note: Flags indicate national team as defined under FIFA eligibility rules; some limited exceptions apply. Players may hold more than one non-FIFA nationality.

No.	Pos.	Nation	Player
15	FW	CRC	Ariel Lassiter
18	DF	FRA	Menzou Nassim
21	DF	USA	Hugo Arellano
22	GK	USA	Jon Kempin
26	MF	USA	Efrain Alvarez
27	MF	MEX	Miguel Aguilar
29	DF	USA	Josh Turnley
38	FW	USA	Bradford Jamieson IV
40	FW	MEX	Raúl Mendiola
41	GK	USA	Justin vom Steeg
42	DF	USA	Erick Gallinar
44	DF	USA	Zico Bailey
45	FW	USA	Jonathan Estrada
48	MF	HKG	Ryo Fujii
49	MF	USA	Adrian Vera
50	DF	USA	Robert Castellanos
51	FW	USA	Ethan Zubak
53	MF	USA	Jorge Hernandez
54	GK	USA	Bennett Sneddon
57	FW	USA	Justin Dhillon
62	DF	USA	Jake Arteaga
63	DF	USA	Tyler Turner
64	MF	USA	Eric Payeras
65	DF	USA	Ian Lonergan
67	MF	USA	Jonathan Hernandez
68	MF	CMR	Andre Ulrich Zanga
69	DF	USA	Jefrey Payeras
70	MF	USA	Alejandro Covarrubias
72	DF	CMR	Jean Jospin Engola
73	FW	USA	Adonis Amaya
74	DF	USA	Alex Juarez
75	GK	USA	Eric Lopez

Signed to first team contract with LA Galaxy.
LA Galaxy Academy player.

=== Transfers ===
==== Transfers in ====
Pos.	Player	Transferred from	Fee/notes	Date	Source
FW	(United States) Justin Dhillon	(United States) LA Galaxy Academy	Sign.	January 13, 2017	
DF	(United States) Robert Castellanos	(Mexico) Atlas	Sign.	February 14, 2017	
MF	(Cameroon) Andre Ulrich Zanga	(Cameroon) Kadji Sports Academy	Sign.	March 10, 2017	
DF	(Cameroon) Jean Jospin Engola	(Cameroon) Kadji Sports Academy	Sign.	March 10, 2017	
MF	(Mexico) Miguel Aguilar	(United States) D.C. United	Sign.	March 10, 2017	
DF	(United States) Tyler Turner	(United States) Orlando City SC	Sign.	March 16, 2017	
MF	(United States) Jonathan Hernandez	(United States) LA Galaxy Academy	Sign.	May 6, 2017	
MF	(United States) Alejandro Covarrubias	(United States) OKC Energy FC	Sign.	May 18, 2017	
MF	(United States) Efrain Alvarez	(United States) LA Galaxy Academy	Sign.	August 2, 2017	
DF	(United States) Jefrey Payeras	(Guatemala) Municipal	Sign.	August 3, 2017	
GK	(United States) Justin Vom Steeg	(Germany) Fortuna Düsseldorf	Sign.	September 8, 2017	

==== Transfers out ====
Pos.	Player	Transferred to	Fee/notes	Date	Source
FW	(United States) Kainoa Bailey		Contract option not exercised.	January 5, 2017	
MF	(United States) Alejandro Covarrubias	(United States) OKC Energy FC	Contract option not exercised.	January 5, 2017	
DF	(United States) Lee Nishanian		Contract option not exercised. Later he signed with (United States) Harrisburg City Islanders	January 5, 2017	
MF	(Colombia) Bryam Rebellón		Contract option not exercised.	January 5, 2017	
FW	(Curaçao) Denzel Slager		Contract option not exercised.	January 5, 2017	
DF	(United States) Hugo Arellano	(United States) LA Galaxy	Sign.	January 13, 2017	
DF	(France) Bradley Diallo	(United States) LA Galaxy	Sign.	February 28, 2017	
MF	(United States) Jaime Villarreal	(United States) LA Galaxy	Sign.	March 2, 2017	
DF	(United States) Nathan Smith	(United States) LA Galaxy	Sign.	March 2, 2017	

== Competitions ==
=== Friendlies ===
February 10	LA Galaxy II	3–0	Cal State Fullerton Titans	Carson, California
	Aguilar; Estrada; Trialist	Report		Stadium: StubHub Center

February 15	LA Galaxy II (United States)	2–0	(Mexico) Club Tijuana Premier	Carson, California
14:00 PT	Trialist 51'; Arteaga 60'	Report		Stadium: StubHub Center

February 25	LA Galaxy II	7–1	San Diego State Aztecs	Carson, California
	Zubak,, Jamieson IV; Vera; Amaya; Raygoza	Report	Goal	Stadium: StubHub Center

March 8	Club Tijuana Premier (Mexico)	3–1	(United States) LA Galaxy II	Tijuana, Mexico
12:00 PT	Goal	Report	Mendez	Stadium: Estadio Caliente

March 11	LA Galaxy II	2–3	Real Monarchs	Carson, California
14:00 PT	Dhillon 38'; Zubak 70' (pen.)	Report	Goal	Stadium: StubHub Center

March 18	LA Galaxy II	0–4	Orange County SC	Carson, California
16:00 PT		Report	(pen.)	Stadium: StubHub Center

=== USL ===
==== Standings ====
Pos	Team	Pld	W	D	L	GF	GA	GD	Pts
11	Rio Grande Valley Toros	32	9	8	15	37	50	−13	35
12	Seattle Sounders 2	32	9	4	19	42	61	−19	31
13	LA Galaxy II	32	8	5	19	32	64	−32	29
14	Vancouver Whitecaps 2	32	5	9	18	32	52	−20	24
15	Portland Timbers 2	32	3	6	23	27	63	−36	15

Source: 2017 USL standings
Rules for classification: 1) total wins; 2) total goal differential; 3) total goals scored; 4) points earned against top four Conference finishers; 5) disciplinary points; 6) coin toss or drawing of lots

==== Regular season ====
The first three LA Galaxy II matches was announced on January 27, 2017. The full schedule was released on January 31, 2017.

All times in Pacific Time Zone.

Win Draw Loss Postponed

March 25 1	LA Galaxy II	2–0	Whitecaps FC 2	Carson, California
2:00 pm	de Wit 5' (o.g.); Amaya (yellow card) 20'; Arellano (yellow card) 64'; Zubak 67'; Hušidić (yellow card) 76'; Dhillon (yellow card) 90+2'	Report	Dean (yellow card) 31'	Stadium: StubHub Center; Attendance: 1,517; Referee: Alejandro Mariscal

April 1 2	San Antonio FC	3–0	LA Galaxy II	San Antonio, Texas
5:30 pm	Castillo 12'; McCarthy (yellow card) 18'; Reed 29'; Forbes 77'; Elizondo (yellow card) 90'	Report	Diallo (yellow card) 13'; Villarreal (red card) 86'	Stadium: Toyota Field; Attendance: 8,074; Referee: Marco Vega

April 8 3	Phoenix Rising FC	2–1	LA Galaxy II	Tempe, Arizona
6:30 pm	Rooney 60' (pen.), 78'	Report	Amaya 51'; Kempin (yellow card) 60'; Zanga (yellow card) 81'	Stadium: Phoenix Rising FC Soccer Complex; Attendance: 6,330; Referee: Daniel Radford

April 15 4	LA Galaxy II	1–2	Seattle Sounders FC 2	Carson, California
7:30 pm	Zanga (yellow card) 16'; Zubak 45'; Juarez (yellow card) 51'; Diallo (yellow card) 54'; Arellano (yellow card) 70'; Fujii (yellow card) 72'	Report	Chenkam 7', (yellow card) 19'; Tolo 12'; Saari (yellow card) 46'	Stadium: StubHub Center; Attendance: 977; Referee: Michael Radchuk

April 22 5	LA Galaxy II	1–1	Orange County SC	Carson, California
7:30 pm	Vera 66'; Zubak (yellow card) 86'	Report	Pineda (yellow card) 33'; Engola 49' (o.g.); Chaplow (yellow card) 65'	Stadium: StubHub Center; Attendance: 2,225; Referee: Timothy Ford

May 6 6	Orange County SC	4–0	LA Galaxy II	Irvine, California
5:00 pm	van Ewijk 28' (pen.), 31'; Juarez 34' (o.g.); Fernandes 59'; Etim (yellow card) 70'	Report	Fujii (yellow card) 45'; Lonergan (yellow card) 79'	Stadium: Orange County Great Park; Attendance: 3,408; Referee: Daniel Radford

May 10 7	LA Galaxy II	0–3	Real Monarchs	Carson, California
7:30 pm	Fujii (yellow card) 7'; Zubak (yellow card) 61' (yellow-red card) 76'; Hernandez (yellow card) 73'	Report	Gallagher (yellow card) 13'; Velásquez 24' (pen.); Hoffman 65'; Hanlin 90+3'	Stadium: StubHub Center; Attendance: 782; Referee: Alex Chilowicz

May 14 8	New York Red Bulls II	1–2	LA Galaxy II	Harrison, New Jersey
6:00 pm	Allen 3'	Report	Amaya 49' (pen.); Arellano (yellow card) 55'; Dhillon 72'	Stadium: Red Bull Arena; Attendance: 673; Referee: Juan Guzman

May 20 9	Rio Grande Valley FC Toros	1–1	LA Galaxy II	Edinburg, Texas
5:30 pm	James (yellow card) 30'; Murphy 36'; Hunter (yellow card) 42'	Report	Arellano (yellow card) 21'; Covarrubias (yellow card) 22' (yellow-red card) 88'; Villareal (yellow card) 40'; Dhillon 72'	Stadium: H-E-B Park; Attendance: 7,788; Referee: Ramy Touchan

May 27 10	LA Galaxy II	1–2	Phoenix Rising FC	Carson, California
7:30 pm	Lassiter 13'; Arellano (yellow card) 22'; Zanga (yellow card) 86'	Report	Timm (yellow card) 30'; Avila 32'; Johnson 61' (pen.); Watson (yellow card) 64'; Gray (yellow card) 75'	Stadium: StubHub Center; Attendance: 2,502; Referee: Chipalo Street

June 3 11	Seattle Sounders FC 2	3–0	LA Galaxy II	Tukwila, Washington
7:00 pm	Parra (yellow card) 37', (goal) 61', 74'; Saari 69'	Report	Castellanos (yellow card) 68'; Engola (yellow card) 70'; Zanga (yellow card) 80'	Stadium: Starfire Sports; Attendance: 1,307; Referee: Baboucarr Jallow

June 10 12	LA Galaxy II	1–2	Colorado Springs Switchbacks	Carson, California
7:30 pm	Zubak (yellow card) 30'; Engola (yellow card) 42'; Dhillon 80'; Fujii (yellow card) 82'	Report	Pouaty (yellow card) 15'; Frater (yellow card) 38', (goal) 65', 90'; Prugh (yellow card) 68'	Stadium: StubHub Center; Attendance: 1,214; Referee: Farhad Dadkho

June 17 13	Rio Grande Valley FC Toros	0–1	LA Galaxy II	Edinburg, Texas
5:30 pm	James (yellow card) 38'	Report	Engola (yellow card) 3'; Hernandez (yellow card) 56'; Estrada 70'	Stadium: H-E-B Park; Attendance: 8,656; Referee: Alex Chilowicz

June 25 14	LA Galaxy II	2–3	Sacramento Republic FC	Carson, California
6:30 pm	Dhillon 53'; Vera 70', (yellow card) 70'; Covarrubias (yellow card) 79'	Report	Hall 10' (pen.); Blackwood 14'; Caesar 19', (yellow card) 45'; Trickett-Smith (yellow card) 65'	Stadium: StubHub Center; Attendance: 712; Referee: Daniel Radford

June 30 15	LA Galaxy II	0–1	Swope Park Rangers	Carson, California
7:30 pm	Covarrubias (yellow card) 43'; Turner (yellow card) 60'; Fujii (yellow card) 77'	Report	Iwasa (yellow card) 45'; Selbol 64'; Gonzalez (yellow card) 85'; Pasher (yellow card) 87'	Stadium: StubHub Center; Attendance: 910; Referee: Kevin Stott

July 3 16	Reno 1868 FC	9–0	LA Galaxy II	Reno, Nevada
7:30 pm	Castellanos 3' (o.g.); Kelly 8'; Murrell 11', 49', (yellow card) 61'; Griffiths (yellow card) 22'; Hoppenot 25' (pen.); LaGrassa 66'; Wehan 76', 84'; Brown (yellow card) 78'; Espinal 88'	Report	Covarrubias (yellow card) 82'	Stadium: Greater Nevada Field; Attendance: 5,140; Referee: Victor Rivas

July 9 17	Portland Timbers 2	3–4	LA Galaxy II	Portland, Oregon
2:00 pm	Ebobisse 25'; Ornstil 33'; Arboleda 82'	Report	Amaya (yellow card) 18'; Engola (yellow card) 28'; Turner 44' (pen.); Vera 47', 50', (yellow card) 57'; Dhillon 60'; Hernandez (yellow card) 77'	Stadium: Providence Park; Attendance: 1,891; Referee: Joseph Dickerson

July 13 18	LA Galaxy II	2–2	Tulsa Roughnecks FC	Carson, California
7:30 pm	Vera 20'; Dhillon 24'; Engola (yellow card) 41'; Lopez (yellow card) 65'	Report	Fernandez (yellow card) 29'; Jadama 62'; Svantesson 71'	Stadium: StubHub Center; Attendance: 736; Referee: Michael Radchuk

July 30 19	LA Galaxy II	1–1	Oklahoma City Energy FC	Carson, California
6:30 pm	Covarrubias (yellow card) 28'; Lassiter 41'	Report	Angulo (yellow card) 11'; Andrews (yellow card) 56'; Craven 75'	Stadium: StubHub Center; Attendance: 705; Referee: Daniel Radford

August 2 20	LA Galaxy II	1–0	Orange County SC	Carson, California
7:30 pm	Covarrubias (yellow card) 15'; Fujii 57'; Castellanos (yellow card) 82'	Report	Ocegueda (yellow card) 58'; Fernandes (yellow card) 90+2'	Stadium: StubHub Center; Attendance: 636; Referee: Victor Rivas

August 5 21	LA Galaxy II	0–2	Phoenix Rising FC	Carson, California
7:30 pm	Payeras (yellow card) 82'	Report	Drogba 13'; Riggi 45'	Stadium: StubHub Center; Attendance: 1,076; Referee: Ramy Touchan

August 18 22	Colorado Springs Switchbacks	1–2	LA Galaxy II	Colorado Springs, Colorado
6:00 pm	Vercollone (yellow card) 59'; McFarlane (yellow card) 64'; King 77'; Suggs (yellow card) 85'	Report	McBean (yellow card) 17'; Lassiter 52'; Covarrubias (yellow card) 63'; Arellano (yellow card) 64'; McFarlane 87' (o.g.)	Stadium: Weidner Field; Attendance: 4,437; Referee: Katja Koroleva

August 27 23	Whitecaps FC 2	2–1	LA Galaxy II	Langley, British Columbia
3:00 pm	Campbell 4'; Norman Jr. (yellow card) 53'; Amanda 83'	Report	Zubak 24'; Covarrubias (yellow card) 88'	Stadium: McLeod Athletic Park; Attendance: 1,494; Referee: Michelle Pye

September 3 24	LA Galaxy II	1–0	Rio Grande Valley FC Toros	Carson, California
6:30 pm	Lassiter 21'; Jo. Villareal (yellow card) 51'; Fujii (yellow card) 72'	Report	Ayala (yellow card) 49'	Stadium: StubHub Center; Attendance: 737; Referee: Alejandro Mariscal

September 6 25	LA Galaxy II	1–2	Reno 1868 FC	Carson, California
7:30 pm	Mendiola 37'; Smith (yellow card) 62'; Turner (yellow card) 83'	Report	Richards 5'; LaGrassa (yellow card) 26'; Espinal 66'; Ockford (yellow card) 90+1'	Stadium: StubHub Center; Attendance: 432; Referee: Daniel Radford

September 9 26	LA Galaxy II	1–1	San Antonio FC	Carson, California
7:30 pm	Turner (yellow card) 37'; Zubak (yellow card) 42'; McBean (yellow card) 45'; Engola 51'; Estrada (yellow card) 90+3'	Report	Hedrick (yellow card) 35'; Reed 88'	Stadium: StubHub Center; Attendance: 1,275; Referee: Malik Badawi

September 16 27	Sacramento Republic FC	2–1	LA Galaxy II	Sacramento, California
7:30 pm	Espino 26'; Bijev 61'	Report	Covarrubias (yellow card) 45+2'; Hernandez (yellow card) 50'; Mendez (yellow card) 89'	Stadium: Papa Murphy's Park; Attendance: 11,569; Referee: Malik Badawi

September 23 28	Tulsa Roughnecks FC	1–0	LA Galaxy II	Tulsa, Oklahoma
5:00 pm	Calistri 26'; Corrales (yellow card) 70'; Levin (yellow card) 73'; Kimura (yellow card) 90+3'	Report	Turner (yellow card) 25'	Stadium: ONEOK Field; Attendance: 3,884; Referee: Greg Dopka

September 27 29	Swope Park Rangers	3–0	LA Galaxy II	Kansas City, Missouri
5:30 pm	Belmar 37'; Moloto 53'; Didic 58'; Selbol (yellow card) 69'	Report	Zanga (yellow card) 55'; Jon. Hernandez (yellow card) 67'; Jor. Hernandez (yellow card) 73'; Vera (yellow card) 83'	Stadium: Swope Soccer Village; Attendance: 857; Referee: Gustavo Solorio

October 1 30	Oklahoma City Energy FC	3–0	LA Galaxy II	Oklahoma City, Oklahoma
3:00 pm	Angulo 38' (pen.), 67', 68'	Report		Stadium: Taft Stadium; Attendance: 4,609; Referee: Michael Radchuk

October 7 31	LA Galaxy II	3–2	Portland Timbers 2	Carson, California
7:30 pm	Engola (yellow card) 29'; Mendiola (yellow card) 31'; Lassiter 52'; Alvarez (yellow card) 63'; McBean 73'; Smith (yellow card) 86'; Payeras 90+4'	Report	Calixtro (yellow card) 5', (goal) 14'; Batista (red card) 58'; Zambrano (yellow card) 80'; Ornstil 88'	Stadium: StubHub Center; Attendance: 3,000; Referee: Kyle Burkhardt

October 14 32	Real Monarchs	2–1	LA Galaxy II	Sandy, Utah
6:00 pm	Orozco 6'; Velásquez 19'	Report	Vera 42'; Covarrubias (yellow card) 47'; Arellano (yellow card) 58'; Engola (red card) 90+4'; Turner (yellow card) 90+7'	Stadium: Rio Tinto Stadium; Attendance: 1,875; Referee: Hamed Sadeghi

== See also ==
- 2017 in American soccer
- 2017 LA Galaxy season
