= 2016 LA Galaxy II season =

LA Galaxy II
2016 season
- Manager: Curt Onalfo
- Stadium: StubHub Center
- USL: Conference: 5th
- Playoffs: First round
- Top goalscorer: League: Jack McBean (15 goals); All: Jack McBean (15 goals)
- Highest home attendance: 2,715 (vs. Arizona United – March 26)
- Lowest home attendance: 503 (vs. San Antonio FC – April 13)
- Average home league attendance: 1,217
Home colors	Away colors

The 2016 LA Galaxy II season was the club's third season of existence.

== Players ==
=== Squad information ===
Squad correct as of July 17, 2016. Note: Flags indicate national team as defined under FIFA eligibility rules; some limited exceptions apply. Players may hold more than one non-FIFA nationality.

No.	Pos.	Nation	Player
29	DF	USA	Josh Turnley
45	DF	USA	Hugo Arellano
47	DF	USA	Nathan Smith
48	MF	HKG	Ryo Fujii
49	MF	USA	Adrian Vera
51	FW	USA	Ethan Zubak
52	MF	COL	Bryam Rebellón
53	DF	FRA	Nassim Menzou
54	GK	USA	Bennett Sneddon
57	MF	USA	Alejandro Covarrubias
58	FW	USA	Kainoa Bailey
65	MF	USA	Jaime Villarreal
68	FW	CUW	Denzel Slager
69	DF	USA	Jefrey Payeras
72	DF	USA	Lee Nishanian
73	FW	USA	Adonis Amaya
75	GK	USA	Eric Lopez

=== Transfers ===
==== Transfers in ====
Pos.	Player	Transferred from	Fee/notes	Date	Source
FW	(Curaçao) Denzel Slager	(United States) Orange County Blues FC	Sign	February 17, 2016	
MF	(Colombia) Bryam Rebellón	(Colombia) Llaneros F.C.	Sign	February 23, 2016	
DF	(Spain) John Neeskens	(United States) New York Cosmos B	Sign	March 14, 2016	
DF	(United States) Josh Turnley	(United States) LA Galaxy	Sign. Turnley was selected by the LA Galaxy in the 2016 MLS SuperDraft.	March 21, 2016	
DF	(United States) Jefrey Payeras	(Guatemala) Municipal	Loan	March 29, 2016	
FW	(United States) Ethan Zubak	(United States) LA Galaxy Academy	Sign	May 19, 2016	
DF	(United States) Hugo Arellano	(United States) LA Galaxy Academy	Sign	July 18, 2016	

==== Transfers out ====
Pos.	Player	Transferred to	Fee/notes	Date	Source
GK	(France) Clément Diop	(United States) LA Galaxy	Sign	December 16, 2015	
DF	(United States) Daniel Steres	(United States) LA Galaxy	Sign	December 17, 2015	
DF	(United States) Joe Franco	(United States) Miami FC	Sign	March 1, 2016	
FW	(Costa Rica) Ariel Lassiter	(United States) LA Galaxy	Sign	March 5, 2016	
GK	(United States) Nicholas Shackelford	None		Announced on March 23, 2016	
MF	(France) André Auras	None		Announced on March 23, 2016	
FW	(United States) Travis Bowen	None		Announced on March 23, 2016	
MF	(United States) Elijah Martin	None		Announced on March 23, 2016	
FW	(United States) Jack McBean	(United States) LA Galaxy	Sign	June 22, 2016	
DF	(Spain) John Neeskens	(Spain) CF Gavà	Sign	July 9, 2016	

== Competitions ==
=== Friendlies ===
February 5	LA Galaxy II	3–2	Cal State Fullerton Titans	Carson, California
10:00 PT	Amaya (?); McBean (?)	Report	(?)	Stadium: StubHub Center

February 12	LA Galaxy II	3–2	San Diego State Aztecs	Carson, California
19:00 PT	Jamieson IV (?); Slager (?); Amaya (?)	Report	(?)	Stadium: StubHub Center

February 20	LA Galaxy II	5–0	UNLV Rebels	Carson, California
19:30 PT	McBean 7', 58'; Jamieson IV 30'; Villarreal 34'; Amaya 68'	Report		Stadium: StubHub Center

February 26	LA Galaxy II	3–0	Loyola Marymount Lions	Carson, California
19:30 PT	Lassiter 1', 24', 36'	Report		Stadium: StubHub Center

March 5	LA Galaxy II	3–3	UCLA Bruins	Carson, California
11:00 PT	McBean 28', 83'; Zubak 87'	Report	(?) (?); 73'	Stadium: StubHub Center

March 9	LA Galaxy II	6–0	UC Riverside Highlanders	Carson, California
9:30 PT	Negrete 9'; Zubak 21', 42'; Nishanian 40'; Vera 45'; McBean 80'	Report		Stadium: StubHub Center Field 6

March 12	LA Galaxy II	1–1	Cal State Northridge Matadors	Carson, California
10:00 PT	Jamieson IV (?)	Report	Goal	Stadium: StubHub Center Field 6

March 13	LA Galaxy II	0–2	Albion SC Pros	Carson, California
10:00 PT				Stadium: StubHub Center Field 6

March 19	LA Galaxy II	4–2	Colorado Springs Switchbacks FC	Carson, California
10:00 PT	Slager (?); Nishanian (?); McBean (?)	Report	(?) (?) (?) (?)	Stadium: StubHub Center Field 6

=== USL ===
==== Standings ====
Pos	Team	Pld	W	D	L	GF	GA	GD	Pts	Qualification
3	Colorado Springs Switchbacks	30	14	7	9	37	27	+10	49	Conference Playoffs
4	Swope Park Rangers	30	14	6	10	45	36	+9	48	Conference Playoffs
5	LA Galaxy II	30	12	11	7	52	42	+10	47	Conference Playoffs
6	Vancouver Whitecaps 2	30	12	9	9	44	44	0	45	Conference Playoffs
7	Oklahoma City Energy	30	10	13	7	32	30	+2	43	Conference Playoffs

Source: 2016 USL Standings
Rules for classification: 1) total wins; 2) total goal differential; 3) total goals scored; 4) points earned against top four Conference finishers; 5) disciplinary points; 6) coin toss or drawing of lots

==== Regular season ====
All times in Eastern Time Zone.

Win Draw Loss Postponed

March 26 1	LA Galaxy II	2–0	Arizona United	Carson, California
22:30	Lassiter 10' (pen.), 30'; McBean (yellow card) 47'; Garcia (yellow card) 50'; Sorto (red card) 62'	Report	Granger (yellow card) 60'; Costa (yellow card) 82'	Stadium: StubHub Center; Attendance: 2,715; Referee: Alex Chilowicz

March 30 2	LA Galaxy II	3–0	Saint Louis FC	Carson, California
22:30	McBean 42', 58'; Rebellón 45'	Report	Bushue (yellow card) 56'; Cochran (yellow card) 74'	Stadium: StubHub Center; Attendance: 743; Referee: Alejandro Mariscal

April 2 3	Real Monarchs	3–3	LA Galaxy II	Sandy, Utah
21:00	Arnone 14'; Copeland (yellow card) 22'; Orellana 24'; Rolfe 45'	Report	Neeskens (yellow card) 50'; Villarreal (yellow card) 68'; Zubak 81'; Fujii 89'; McBean 90' (pen.)	Stadium: Rio Tinto Stadium; Attendance: 1,639; Referee: Hamed Sadeghi

April 8 4	LA Galaxy II	1–1	Orange County Blues	Carson, California
22:30	Turnley (yellow card) 39'; Villarreal 68'; Slager (yellow card) ?'; Payeras (yellow card) ?'	Report	Crettenand 73'; Pluntke (yellow card) ?'; Popara (yellow card) ?'; Ajeakwa (yellow card) ?'; Mirković (yellow card) ?'	Stadium: StubHub Center; Attendance: 719; Referee: Reyna Fonseca

April 13 5	LA Galaxy II	1–1	San Antonio FC	Carson, California
22:30	McBean 40'	Report	Alvarez 89'	Stadium: StubHub Center; Attendance: 503; Referee: Michael Zapata

April 22 6	LA Galaxy II	2–2	Vancouver Whitecaps 2	Carson, California
22:30	Villarreal 45'; McBean 56'; Covarrubias (yellow card) 68'; Rebellón (red card) 83'	Report	Davies (yellow card) 42'; Seiler (yellow card) 44'; Safiu 58', (yellow card) 84'; Greig 76'; Hurtado (yellow card) 84'	Stadium: StubHub Center; Attendance: 527; Referee: Issam Ashkar

April 30 7	Rio Grande Valley Toros	0–2	LA Galaxy II	Edinburg, Texas
20:30		Report	McBean 47'; Lassiter 53'	Stadium: RGVFC Stadium; Referee: Rosendo Mendoza

May 4 8	LA Galaxy II	3–2	Colorado Springs Switchbacks	Carson, California
22:30	McBean 32', 47', 71'	Report	Robinson 77'; Seth 90'	Stadium: StubHub Center; Attendance: 1,724; Referee: Michael Radchuk

May 7 9	LA Galaxy II	0–2	Sacramento Republic	Carson, California
22:30	McBean (yellow card) 81'; Smith (yellow card) 90'	Report	Klimenta 16'; Williams (yellow card) 34', (goal) 62'; Iwasa (yellow card) 56'; Stewart (yellow card) 90'	Stadium: StubHub Center; Attendance: 1,604; Referee: Alex Chilowicz

May 15 10	Vancouver Whitecaps 2	4–3	LA Galaxy II	University Endowment Lands, British Columbia
17:00	Greig 3', 17'; Davies 21'; Baldisimo (yellow card) 24'; Safiu (yellow card) 73'; Levis 81'; Gardner (yellow card) 90+4'	Report	Villarreal 35', 90+2' (pen.); Nishanian (yellow card) 71'; Slager 84'	Stadium: Thunderbird Stadium; Attendance: 2,778

May 22 11	Seattle Sounders 2	1–1	LA Galaxy II	Tukwila, Washington
20:00	O'Ojong 43'	Report	Romney 81'	Stadium: Starfire Sports; Referee: Rosendo Mendoza

May 28 12	LA Galaxy II	4–1	Arizona United	Carson, California
22:30	Fujii 20', 34'; McBean 23', 86'	Report	Tan 75' (pen.)	Stadium: StubHub Center; Referee: Malik Badawi

June 4 13	Sacramento Republic	2–2	LA Galaxy II	Sacramento, California
23:00	Barrera 51'; Trickett-Smith 81'	Report	Ja. Villarreal 57'; Jo. Villarreal 58'	Stadium: Bonney Field; Attendance: 11,569; Referee: Levi Rippy

June 11 14	LA Galaxy II	0–0	Colorado Springs Switchbacks	Carson, California
22:30		Report		Stadium: StubHub Center; Attendance: 708; Referee: Alex Chilowicz

June 17 15	Tulsa Roughnecks	2–2	LA Galaxy II	Tulsa, Oklahoma
20:30	Ochoa 42' (pen.); Sneddon 47' (o.g.)	Report	Payeras 3'; McBean 23'	Stadium: ONEOK Field; Referee: Luis Guardia

June 24 16	LA Galaxy II	2–0	Tulsa Roughnecks	Carson, California
22:30	Amaya 7'; Covarrubias 47' (pen.)	Report		Stadium: StubHub Center; Attendance: 583; Referee: Farhad Dadhko

July 2 17	LA Galaxy II	2–1	Orange County Blues	Carson, California
22:30	Amaya 34'; McBean 78' (pen.)	Report	Caesar 81'	Stadium: StubHub Center; Attendance: 1,382; Referee: Michael Zapata

July 16 18	Portland Timbers 2	1–4	LA Galaxy II	Portland, Oregon
17:00	Lewis (yellow card) 9'; Belmar (yellow card) 21'; Clarke (yellow card) 24' (yellow-red card) 54', (goal) 35'; Arboleda (yellow card) 55'	Report	Nishanian 6'; Rebellón 18'; Mendiola 39'; Amaya (yellow card) 41'; Smith (yellow card) 45'; Arellano (yellow card) 70'; McBean 75'; Jamieson IV (yellow card) 77'	Stadium: Merlo Field; Attendance: 2,152; Referee: Chipalo Street

July 23 19	San Antonio FC	2–3	LA Galaxy II	San Antonio, Texas
20:30	Castillo 2', (yellow card) 71'; Palacios (yellow card) 54'; McCarthy 84', (yellow card) 89'; Reed (yellow card) 90'; Garcia (yellow card) 90'	Report	Villarreal 5', 35', (yellow card) 38'; McBean 20', (yellow card) 89'; Slager (yellow card) 20'; Amaya (yellow card) 90'	Stadium: Toyota Field; Attendance: 7,690; Referee: Reyna Fonseca

July 30 20	Orange County Blues	2–0	LA Galaxy II	Irvine, California
22:30	Caesar 19', 61'	Report		Stadium: Anteater Stadium; Referee: Ekaterina Koroleva

August 6 21	LA Galaxy II	3–4	Portland Timbers 2	Carson, California
22:30	Taylor 9' (o.g.); Lassiter 15', 45'; Amaya (red card) 64'	Report	Bodily 65'; Bijev 68' (pen.), 87'; Brett 90'	Stadium: StubHub Center; Attendance: 2,019; Referee: Daniel Radford

August 13 22	Oklahoma City Energy	0–0	LA Galaxy II	Oklahoma City, Oklahoma
20:30		Report		Stadium: Taft Stadium; Referee: Rosendo Mendoza

August 20 23	Orange County Blues	2–0	LA Galaxy II	Irvine, California
22:00	Chaplow 42'; Cortes (yellow card) 67' (yellow-red card) 67'; Bjurman 74'	Report	Arellano (red card) 27'	Stadium: Anteater Stadium; Referee: Timothy Ford

August 27 24	Swope Park Rangers	2–1	LA Galaxy II	Kansas City, Missouri
20:30	Duke 16'; Gonzalez 25'	Report	Jamieson IV 2'	Stadium: Swope Soccer Village; Referee: Kyle Burkhardt

August 31 25	Arizona United	1–2	LA Galaxy II	Peoria, Arizona
22:30	Rooney 28'	Report	Lassiter 16'; Amaya 73'	Stadium: Peoria Sports Complex; Referee: Brandon Marshall

September 3 26	Colorado Springs Switchbacks	3–0	LA Galaxy II	Colorado Springs, Colorado
21:00	Seth 10', 45+2'; Vercollone 58'	Report		Stadium: Switchbacks Stadium; Attendance: 4,112; Referee: Chris Greer

September 10 27	LA Galaxy II	1–1	Sacramento Republic	Carson, California
22:30	Lassiter 39'	Report	Kneeshaw 83'	Stadium: StubHub Center; Attendance: 1,417; Referee: Ramy Touchan

September 14 28	LA Galaxy II	1–0	Rio Grande Valley Toros	Carson, California
22:30	Lassiter 61'	Report		Stadium: StubHub Center; Attendance: 714; Referee: Timothy Ford

September 17 29	Sacramento Republic	1–1	LA Galaxy II	Sacramento, California
22:30	Barrera (yellow card) 69'; Iwasa (yellow card) 74'; Kneeshaw 80'; Kiffe (yellow card) 90'	Report	Zubak 44'; Rebellón (yellow card) 62' (yellow-red card) 75'; Smith (yellow card) 65'	Stadium: Bonney Field; Attendance: 11,569; Referee: Victor Rivas

September 24 30	LA Galaxy II	3–1	Real Monarchs	Carson, California
22:30	Lassiter 18'; Mendiola 66'; Amaya 71'	Report	Velazco 29'	Stadium: StubHub Center; Attendance: 1,686; Referee: Ramy Touchan

==== Playoffs ====
September 30 First round	Swope Park Rangers	3–0	LA Galaxy II	Kansas City, Missouri
17:30 PT	Tyrpak 76'; Gonzalez 90+3', 90+5'	Report	Villarreal (red card) 65'	Stadium: Swope Soccer Village; Attendance: 1,885; Referee: Guido Gonzales Jr.

== See also ==
- 2016 in American soccer
- 2016 LA Galaxy season
