= 2018 LA Galaxy season =

American soccer club season

LA Galaxy
2018 season
- Owner: Philip Anschutz (AEG)
- Head coach: Sigi Schmid (Until September 10); Dominic Kinnear (interim)
- Stadium: StubHub Center
- MLS: Conference: 7th Overall: 13th
- U.S. Open Cup: Round of 16
- Top goalscorer: League: Zlatan Ibrahimović (21 goals); All: Zlatan Ibrahimović (21 goals)
- Highest home attendance: 27,068 (vs. Los Angeles FC – March 31 and August 24); 27,068 (vs. Houston Dynamo – October 28)
- Lowest home attendance: 18,003 (vs. FC Dallas – May 30)
- Average home league attendance: 24,957
Home colors	Away colors

The 2018 LA Galaxy season was the club's twenty-third season of existence, their twenty-third in Major League Soccer.

== Players ==
=== Squad information ===
As the end of the season.

No.	Position	Player	Nation
1	GK	USA	David Bingham
2	MF	USA	Perry Kitchen
3	DF	ENG	Ashley Cole
4	DF	USA	Dave Romney
5	DF	USA	Daniel Steres
6	MF	BIH	Baggio Hušidić
7	MF	FRA	Romain Alessandrini (DP)
8	MF	MEX	Jonathan dos Santos (DP)
9	FW	SWE	Zlatan Ibrahimović
10	FW	MEX	Giovani dos Santos (DP)
11	FW	NOR	Ola Kamara
12	GK	USA	Brian Sylvestre
14	MF	USA	Servando Carrasco
15	FW	CRC	Ariel Lassiter
16	DF	NOR	Jørgen Skjelvik
17	MF	USA	Sebastian Lletget
19	MF	USA	Chris Pontius
20	DF	USA	Tomas Hilliard-Arce
21	DF	USA	Hugo Arellano (HGP)
24	MF	GHA	Emmanuel Boateng
25	DF	VEN	Rolf Feltscher
26	MF	USA	Efrain Alvarez
28	DF	FRA	Michaël Ciani
29	DF	USA	Sheanon Williams
38	FW	USA	Bradford Jamieson IV (HGP)
41	GK	USA	Justin Vom Steeg

== Transfers ==
=== Transfers in ===
Pos.	Player	Transferred from	Fee/notes	Date	Source
DF	(Norway) Jørgen Skjelvik	(Norway) Rosenborg	Free transfer.	December 14, 2017	
GK	(United States) David Bingham	(United States) San Jose Earthquakes	$100,000 in General Allocation Money and $100,000 in TAM.	December 18, 2017	
DF	(Venezuela) Rolf Feltscher	(Wales) Cardiff City	Free transfer.	December 19, 2017	
MF	(United States) Servando Carrasco	(United States) Orlando City SC	Selected on Stage 2 of the 2017 MLS Re-Entry Draft.	December 21, 2017	
MF	(United States) Perry Kitchen	(Denmark) Randers	Traded $100,000 in GAM and $200,000 in TAM to (United States) D.C. United for the player's Discovery Rights.	January 9, 2018	
GK	(United States) Brian Sylvestre	(United States) North Carolina FC	Free transfer.	January 12, 2018	
DF	(Montenegro) Emrah Klimenta	(United States) Sacramento Republic FC	Free transfer.	January 16, 2018	
FW	(Norway) Ola Kamara	(United States) Columbus Crew SC	Acquired in exchange for (United States) Gyasi Zardes and $400,000 in TAM.	January 20, 2018	
MF	(United States) Chris Pontius	(United States) Philadelphia Union	Sign.	January 22, 2018	
GK	(United States) Justin Vom Steeg	(United States) LA Galaxy II	Sign.	March 1, 2018	
MF	(United States) Efrain Alvarez	(United States) LA Galaxy II	Sign.	March 4, 2018	
FW	(Sweden) Zlatan Ibrahimović	(England) Manchester United	Free transfer.	March 23, 2018	
DF	(United States) Sheanon Williams	(Canada) Vancouver Whitecaps FC	Sign.	June 14, 2018	

=== Draft picks ===
Draft picks are not automatically signed to the team roster. Only those who are signed to a contract will be listed as transfers in. Only trades involving draft picks and executed after the start of 2018 MLS SuperDraft will be listed in the notes.

Date	Player	Position	College	Pick	Source
January 19, 2018	(United States) Tomas Hilliard-Arce	DF	Stanford	Round 1 – 2nd pick	
January 19, 2018	(United States) Drew Skundrich	MF	Stanford	Round 2 – 40th pick	
January 21, 2018	(United States) Nate Shultz	DF	Akron	Round 3 – 48th pick	
January 21, 2018	PASS			Round 4 – 90th pick	

=== Transfers out ===
Pos.	Player	Transferred to	Fee/notes	Date	Source
DF	(United States) Robbie Rogers		Retired.	November 7, 2017	
MF	(United States) Jermaine Jones		Contract option declined.	November 27, 2017	
GK	(United States) Jon Kempin	(United States) Columbus Crew SC	Contract option declined. Later he was traded for a 2018 MLS SuperDraft fourth round pick.	November 27, 2017	
MF	(United States) Rafael Garcia		Contract option declined.	November 27, 2017	
GK	(United States) Brian Rowe	(Canada) Vancouver Whitecaps FC	Contract option declined. Later he was traded for a second-round pick in the 2018 MLS SuperDraft.	November 27, 2017	
FW	(United States) Jose Villareal	(United States) Orlando City SC	Contract option declined. Later he was traded for a third-round pick in the 2019 MLS SuperDraft.	November 27, 2017	
FW	(United States) Jack McBean	(United States) Colorado Rapids	Contract option declined. Later he was traded for a conditional fourth-round selection in the 2019 MLS SuperDraft.	November 27, 2017	
MF	(Mexico) Raúl Mendiola	(United States) Reno 1868	Contract option declined.	November 27, 2017	
DF	(Netherlands) Pele van Anholt	(Netherlands) NAC Breda	Contract option declined.	November 27, 2017	
GK	(Senegal) Clément Diop	(Canada) Montreal Impact	Contract option declined. Later he was selected in the MLS Waiver Draft.	November 27, 2017	
MF	(United States) Jaime Villarreal	(United States) Sacramento Republic FC	Contract option declined.	November 27, 2017	
DF	(United States) Nathan Smith	(United States) Portland Timbers 2	Contract option declined.	November 27, 2017	
DF	(France) Bradley Diallo	(Romania) CS Gaz Metan Mediaș	Contract option declined.	November 27, 2017	
FW	(United States) Jack McInerney	(United States) Indy Eleven	Contract option declined.	November 27, 2017	
FW	(United States) Gyasi Zardes	(United States) Columbus Crew SC	Traded along with $400,000 in TAM for (Norway) Ola Kamara.	January 20, 2018	
DF	(Montenegro) Emrah Klimenta	(United States) Sacramento Republic FC	Released.	June 14, 2018	
MF	(Portugal) João Pedro	(Greece) Apollon Smyrnis	Loan.	August 21, 2018	

== Competitions ==
=== Preseason ===
Preseason schedule announced on December 6, 2017.

==== Mobile Mini Sun Cup ====
The schedule for the tournament was released on December 15, 2017.

February 3	LA Galaxy	1–3	Real Salt Lake	Tucson, Arizona
15:30	Ciani 33'	Report	Saucedo 51' (pen.); Besler 56'; Velásquez 77'	Stadium: Kino Sports Complex

==== Friendlies ====
February 10	LA Galaxy	3–0	New York City FC	Carson, California
19:00 PT	Kamara 9'; Hilliard-Arce 70'; Hušidić 90'	Report		Stadium: StubHub Center

February 15	LA Galaxy	3–1	Fresno FC	Santa Barbara, California
19:30	Lletget 26'; Pontius 50'; Hilliard-Arce 77'	Report	Bustamante 19'	Stadium: Harder Stadium

February 17	LA Galaxy	2–4	San Jose Earthquakes	Irvine, California
14:00 PT	Kamara 36', 74'; Carrasco (yellow card) 78'; Büscher (yellow card) 88'	Report	Jungwirth (yellow card) 10'; Wondolowski 38'; Thompson 54', 90'; Alashe 55'	Stadium: Orange County Great Park; Attendance: 5,015

February 24	LA Galaxy	1–2	Vancouver Whitecaps FC	Carson, California
19:00 PT	Skjelvik (yellow card) 13'; Alessandrini (yellow card) 49'; Giovani 66' (pen.)	Report	Juárez (yellow card) 7'; Kamara 20' (pen.); Davies 52'; Marinovic (yellow card) 90+2'	Stadium: StubHub Center

=== Major League Soccer ===
==== Standings ====
===== Overall =====
Pos	Team	Pld	W	L	T	GF	GA	GD	Pts
11	Philadelphia Union	34	15	14	5	49	50	−1	50
12	Real Salt Lake	34	14	13	7	55	58	−3	49
13	LA Galaxy	34	13	12	9	66	64	+2	48
14	Vancouver Whitecaps FC	34	13	13	8	54	67	−13	47
15	Montreal Impact	34	14	16	4	47	53	−6	46

Source: MLS
Rules for classification: 1) points; 2) total wins; 3) total goal differential; 4) total goals scored; 5) disciplinary points; 6) away goals scored; 7) away goal differential; 8) coin toss or drawing of lots

===== Western Conference =====
Pos	Team	Pld	W	L	T	GF	GA	GD	Pts	Qualification
5	Portland Timbers	34	15	10	9	54	48	+6	54	MLS Cup Knockout Round
6	Real Salt Lake	34	14	13	7	55	58	−3	49	MLS Cup Knockout Round
7	LA Galaxy	34	13	12	9	66	64	+2	48	
8	Vancouver Whitecaps FC	34	13	13	8	54	67	−13	47	
9	Houston Dynamo	34	10	16	8	58	58	0	38	

Source: MLS

==== Regular season ====
The first two matches of 2018 MLS season were announced on December 19, 2017. The full schedule was released on January 4, 2018.

All times are in Pacific Time Zone.

Win Draw Loss Void Postponed

March 4 1	LA Galaxy	2–1	Portland Timbers	Carson, California
19:00	Alessandrini (yellow card) 18', (goal) 34'; Kamara 32'; Ciani (yellow card) 89'	Report	Blanco 66'; Mabiala (yellow card) 86'	Stadium: StubHub Center; Attendance: 25,462; Referee: Jair Marrufo

March 11 2	New York City FC	2–1	LA Galaxy	New York City, New York
14:00	Tinnerholm 22'; Villa 33'	Report	Jonathan (yellow card) 11', (goal) 60'; Cole (yellow card) 76' (yellow-red card) 85'	Stadium: Yankee Stadium; Attendance: 26,221; Referee: Ismail Elfath

March 24 3	Vancouver Whitecaps FC	0–0	LA Galaxy	Vancouver, British Columbia
19:00		Report	Feltscher (yellow card) 53'	Stadium: BC Place; Attendance: 22,120; Referee: Fotis Bazakos

March 31 4	LA Galaxy	4–3	Los Angeles FC	Carson, California
12:00	Lletget 61'; Pontius 73'; Ibrahimović 77', 90+1', (yellow card) 78'	Report	Vela 5', 26'; Steres 48' (o.g.)	Stadium: StubHub Center; Attendance: 27,068; Referee: Mark Geiger

April 8 5	LA Galaxy	0–2	Sporting Kansas City	Carson, California
18:00	Steres (yellow card) 55'; Jonathan (yellow card) 77'	Report	Sallói 56'; Russell 61'; Espinoza (yellow card) 82'	Stadium: StubHub Center; Attendance: 25,846; Referee: Robert Sibiga

April 14 6	Chicago Fire	0–1	LA Galaxy	Bridgeview, Illinois
12:30	Vincent (yellow card) 45'; Gordon (yellow card) 48'	Report	Alessandrini (yellow card) 35'; Ibrahimović 45+1'; Kitchen (yellow card) 77'; Cole (yellow card) 89'	Stadium: Toyota Park; Attendance: 21,915; Referee: Ted Unkel

April 21 7	LA Galaxy	0–2	Atlanta United FC	Carson, California
19:30	Skjelvik (yellow card) 24'; Kitchen (yellow card) 29'; Carrasco (yellow card) 85'	Report	Martínez 22'; Parkhurst (yellow card) 75'; Almirón (yellow card) 77', (goal) 90+4' (pen.); Williams (yellow card) 90+3'	Stadium: StubHub Center; Attendance: 25,846; Referee: Baldomero Toledo

April 28 8	LA Galaxy	2–3	New York Red Bulls	Carson, California
19:30	Kamara 59'; Giovani (yellow card) 61', (goal) 66'	Report	Royer 7'; Valot 49'; Kaku 84' (pen.); Meara (yellow card) 89'	Stadium: StubHub Center; Attendance: 26,704; Referee: Allen Chapman

May 5 9	Houston Dynamo	3–2	LA Galaxy	Houston, Texas
17:30	Fuenmayor 3'; Quioto 47'; Rodriguez 90'	Report	Kitchen (yellow card) 20'; Ciani (yellow card) 34'; Cole (yellow card) 36'; Giovani 39'; Kamara 85'	Stadium: BBVA Compass Stadium; Attendance: 22,320; Referee: Alan Kelly

May 12 10	FC Dallas	3–2	LA Galaxy	Frisco, Texas
12:30	Urruti 28', (yellow card) 87'; Lamah 44', 52'; Ziegler (yellow card) 58' (yellow-red card) 73'	Report	Cole (yellow card) 45+1'; Kamara 47'; Boateng 83'; Ciani (yellow card) 86'	Stadium: Toyota Stadium; Attendance: 18,355; Referee: José Carlos Rivero

May 21 11	Montreal Impact	0–1	LA Galaxy	Montreal, Quebec
12:00	Petrasso (yellow card) 41'; Donadel (yellow card) 68'; Raitala (yellow card) 71'	Report	Lletget (yellow card) 22'; Kitchen (yellow card) 37'; Ibrahimović (red card) 41'; Kamara 75'; Bingham (yellow card) 87'	Stadium: Saputo Stadium; Attendance: 20,801; Referee: Ismail Elfath

May 25 12	LA Galaxy	1–0	San Jose Earthquakes	Carson, California
20:00	Alessandrini 82'; Kamara (yellow card) 85'	Report		Stadium: StubHub Center; Attendance: 23,118; Referee: Kevin Stott

May 30 13	LA Galaxy	2–3	FC Dallas	Carson, California
19:30	Boateng (yellow card) 63'; Ibrahimović 69', 90+7'	Report	Hollingshead 33'; Colmán 40', (red card) 80'; Gruezo 66'; González (yellow card) 90+2'	Stadium: StubHub Center; Attendance: 18,003; Referee: Drew Fischer

June 2 14	Portland Timbers	1–1	LA Galaxy	Portland, Oregon
14:00	Valeri 57' (pen.); Chará (yellow card) 62'	Report	Pontius 20'; João Pedro (yellow card) 74'	Stadium: Providence Park; Attendance: 21,144; Referee: Alan Kelly

June 9 15	LA Galaxy	3–0	Real Salt Lake	Carson, California
19:30	Skjelvik (yellow card) 53'; Ibrahimović 61', 67'; Kamara (yellow card) 69', (goal) 76'	Report	Lennon (yellow card) 64'; Marcelo Silva (yellow card) 79'	Stadium: StubHub Center; Attendance: 25,462; Referee: Ted Unkel

June 30 16	San Jose Earthquakes	3–3	LA Galaxy	Stanford, California
19:00	Wondolowski 15', 69' (pen.); Vako 39'; Ockford (yellow card) 48'	Report	Ibrahimović 1', 25', (yellow card) 90'; Alessandrini 20', (yellow card) 82'; Jamieson IV (yellow card) 78'	Stadium: Stanford Stadium; Attendance: 50,743; Referee: Jose Carlos Rivero

July 4 17	LA Galaxy	2–2	D.C. United	Carson, California
19:30	Ibrahimović 5'; Pontius 25'; Kitchen (yellow card) 30'; Hušidić (yellow card) 87'	Report	Stieber 26'; Durkin (yellow card) 29'; Mora (yellow card) 80'; Mattocks 85'	Stadium: StubHub Center; Attendance: 25,462; Referee: Silviu Petrescu

July 7 18	LA Galaxy	4–0	Columbus Crew SC	Carson, California
19:30	Skjelvik (yellow card) 22'; Kamara 42'; Ibrahimović 56' (pen.); Pontius (yellow card) 63'; Alessandrini 67', 90+3'	Report	Williams (yellow card) 61'	Stadium: StubHub Center; Attendance: 21,211; Referee: Hilario Grajeda

July 14 19	New England Revolution	2–3	LA Galaxy	Foxborough, Massachusetts
16:30	Penilla (red card) 23'; Fagúndez 28'; Caicedo 45', (yellow card) 84'; Delamea (yellow card) 57'; Zahibo (yellow card) 71'	Report	Alessandrini (yellow card) 23'; Pontius 38', 90+3'; Kitchen (yellow card) 42'; Cole (yellow card) 59' (yellow-red card) 85'; Romney 90+2'	Stadium: Gillette Stadium; Attendance: 36,573; Referee: Robert Sibiga

July 21 20	Philadelphia Union	1–3	LA Galaxy	Chester, Pennsylvania
16:00	Sapong 29'; Picault (yellow card) 31'; Medunjanin (yellow card) 79'	Report	Kamara 48'; Ibrahimović 63'; Ciani (yellow card) 64', (goal) 82'; Alessandrini (yellow card) 80'	Stadium: Talen Energy Stadium; Attendance: 19,013; Referee: Nima Saghafi

July 26 21	Los Angeles FC	2–2	LA Galaxy	Los Angeles, California
19:30	Vela 7'; Nguyen 20'	Report	Alessandrini (yellow card) 37', (goal) 82'; Giovani (yellow card) 51'; Skjelvik (yellow card) 71'; Kamara 86'; Lletget (yellow card) 89'	Stadium: Banc of California Stadium; Attendance: 22,716; Referee: Alan Kelly

July 29 22	LA Galaxy	4–3	Orlando City SC	Carson, California
18:30	Ciani (yellow card) 8'; Giovani 39'; Ibrahimović 47', 67', 71', (yellow card) 72'	Report	Higuita 18'; Ciani 44' (o.g.); Rocha (yellow card) 48'; Dwyer 54'	Stadium: StubHub Center; Attendance: 24,941; Referee: Armando Villarreal

August 4 23	Colorado Rapids	2–1	LA Galaxy	Commerce City, Colorado
18:00	Acosta 50'; Ford (yellow card) 62'; Nicholson 90'	Report	Alessandrini 33'; Cole (yellow card) 41'; Carrasco (yellow card) 44'; Pontius (yellow card) 65'	Stadium: Dick's Sporting Goods Park; Attendance: 17,837; Referee: Sorin Stoica

August 11 24	LA Galaxy	2–2	Minnesota United FC	Carson, California
19:30	Alessandrini 7'; Lletget 73'	Report	Boxall (yellow card) 55', (goal) 64'; Calvo (yellow card) 66' (yellow-red card) 89'; Warner (yellow card) 75'; Rodríguez (yellow card) 78'; R. Ibarra 84'	Stadium: StubHub Center; Attendance: 24,891; Referee: Baldomero Toledo

August 14 25	LA Galaxy	2–2	Colorado Rapids	Carson, California
19:30	Romney (yellow card) 50'; Cole 59'; Carrasco (yellow card) 73'; Lletget 78'	Report	Ford (yellow card) 27'; Castillo 74'; Jackson 82'	Stadium: StubHub Center; Attendance: 16,231; Referee: Kevin Stott

August 18 26	Seattle Sounders FC	5–0	LA Galaxy	Seattle, Washington
13:00	Marshall 3'; Shipp 18'; Carrasco 50' (o.g.); C. Roldan 59'; Ruidíaz 67'	Report		Stadium: CenturyLink Field; Attendance: 44,213; Referee: Mark Geiger

August 24 27	LA Galaxy	1–1	Los Angeles FC	Carson, California
19:30	Ibrahimović 15', (yellow card) 59'; Feltscher (yellow card) 18'; Pontius (yellow card) 45+2'; Skjelvik (yellow card) 67'; Romney (yellow card) 86'	Report	Feilhaber (yellow card) 48'; Vela 51' (pen.)	Stadium: StubHub Center; Attendance: 27,068; Referee: Jair Marrufo

September 1 28	Real Salt Lake	6–2	LA Galaxy	Sandy, Utah
19:00	Rusnák 14', 68'; Kreilach 45+3', 61', 71'; Savarino 48'	Report	Jonathan 1'; Kitchen (yellow card) 35'; Alessandrini 63'; Feltscher (yellow card) 64'	Stadium: Rio Tinto Stadium; Attendance: 21,363; Referee: Drew Fischer

September 15 29	Toronto FC	5–3	LA Galaxy	Toronto, Ontario
16:30	Vázquez 5'; Altidore 16', (yellow card) 79'; Osorio (yellow card) 28', (goal) 75'; Giovinco 36'; Hagglund (yellow card) 53'; Morrow (yellow card) 58'; Chapman 90+4'	Report	Skjelvik (yellow card) 24'; Ibrahimović 43', (yellow card) 82'; Kamara 54'; Feltscher 58', (yellow card) 86'; Romney (yellow card) 68'; Jonathan (yellow card) 90'; Boateng (yellow card) 90+3'	Stadium: BMO Field; Attendance: 30,799; Referee: Nima Saghafi

September 23 30	LA Galaxy	3–0	Seattle Sounders FC	Carson, California
16:00	Ibrahimović 9' (pen.); Feltscher (yellow card) 31'; Kamara 40'; Boateng 52'; Steres (yellow card) 75'	Report		Stadium: StubHub Center; Attendance: 25,503; Referee: José Carlos Rivero

September 29 31	LA Galaxy	3–0	Vancouver Whitecaps FC	Carson, California
19:00	Ibrahimović 4', 58' (pen.); Feltscher (yellow card) 37'; Alessandrini 77' (pen.)	Report	Techera (yellow card) 90+3'	Stadium: StubHub Center; Attendance: 25,659; Referee: Baldomero Toledo

October 6 32	Sporting Kansas City	1–1	LA Galaxy	Kansas City, Kansas
17:30	Sinovic (yellow card) 34'; Russell (yellow card) 49', (goal) 83'; Sánchez (yellow card) 49'; Sallói (yellow card) 50'; Rubio (yellow card) 90+7'	Report	Ibrahimović 25' (pen.); Bingham (yellow card) 89'	Stadium: Children's Mercy Park; Attendance: 20,092; Referee: Jair Marrufo

October 21 33	Minnesota United FC	1–3	LA Galaxy	Minneapolis, Minnesota
14:00	Rodríguez 53'; Boxall (yellow card) 65'; Fernando Bob (yellow card) 70'	Report	Ibrahimović 30'; Kamara 50'; Alessandrini 51', (yellow card) 70'	Stadium: TCF Bank Stadium; Attendance: 52,242; Referee: Alan Kelly

October 28 34	LA Galaxy	2–3	Houston Dynamo	Carson, California
13:30	Kamara 27', 30'	Report	Quioto 57'; Manotas 73' (pen.), 79'; Cerén (yellow card) 89'; García (yellow card) 90+4'; Peña (yellow card) 90+8' (red card)	Stadium: StubHub Center; Attendance: 27,068; Referee: Kevin Stott

=== U.S. Open Cup ===
==== Fourth round ====
The draw for this round was held on May 24, 2018.

June 6	LA Galaxy (California)	3–1	(California) FC Golden State Force	Carson, California
19:30 PT	Jamieson 15'; Lassiter 37', 85'; Requejo (yellow card) 39'; João Pedro (yellow card) 65'; Klimenta (yellow card) 75'	Report	Ruiz (yellow card) 31'; Fonseca 48'; Oduro (yellow card) 54'	Stadium: StubHub Center; Attendance: 2,626; Referee: Ramy Touchan

==== Round of 16 ====
The draw for this round was held on June 7, 2018.

June 15	Portland Timbers (Oregon)	1–0	(California) LA Galaxy	Portland, Oregon
20:00 PT	Blanco 30'; Asprilla (yellow card) 90+2'	Report	Kitchen (yellow card) 42'; Carrasco (yellow card) 62'	Stadium: Providence Park; Attendance: 14,556; Referee: Joseph Dickerson

== Statistics ==
=== Appearances and goals ===
Last updated on October 28, 2018

No.	Pos	Nat	Player	Total		MLS		U.S. Open Cup	
No.	Pos	Nat	Player	Apps	Goals	Apps	Goals	Apps	Goals
Goalkeepers
1	GK	(United States) USA	David Bingham	35	0	34	0	1	0
12	GK	(United States) USA	Brian Sylvestre	0	0	0	0	0	0
41	GK	(United States) USA	Justin Vom Steeg	1	0	0	0	1	0
Defenders
3	DF	(England) ENG	Ashley Cole	32	1	30+1	1	1	0
4	DF	(United States) USA	David Romney	30	1	26+2	1	1+1	0
5	DF	(United States) USA	Daniel Steres	21	0	14+6	0	1	0
16	DF	(Norway) NOR	Jørgen Skjelvik	33	0	29+3	0	1	0
20	DF	(United States) USA	Tomas Hilliard-Arce	6	0	4+1	0	1	0
21	DF	(United States) USA	Hugo Arellano	0	0	0	0	0	0
25	DF	(Venezuela) VEN	Rolf Feltscher	15	1	15	1	0	0
28	DF	(France) FRA	Michaël Ciani	22	1	19+2	1	1	0
29	DF	(United States) USA	Sheanon Williams	8	0	1+7	0	0	0
46	DF	(United States) USA	John Requejo	1	0	0	0	1	0
Midfielders
2	MF	(United States) USA	Perry Kitchen	32	0	27+4	0	1	0
6	MF	(Bosnia and Herzegovina) BIH	Baggio Hušidić	8	0	1+6	0	0+1	0
7	MF	(France) FRA	Romain Alessandrini	26	11	23+3	11	0	0
8	MF	(Mexico) MEX	Jonathan dos Santos	23	2	22+1	2	0	0
14	MF	(United States) USA	Servando Carrasco	21	0	10+9	0	1+1	0
17	MF	(United States) USA	Sebastian Lletget	29	3	21+7	3	0+1	0
18	MF	(Germany) GER	Julian Büscher	1	0	0	0	1	0
19	MF	(United States) USA	Chris Pontius	27	5	15+11	5	1	0
24	MF	(Ghana) GHA	Emmanuel Boateng	29	2	12+15	2	2	0
Forwards
9	FW	(Sweden) SWE	Zlatan Ibrahimović	27	22	24+3	22	0	0
10	FW	(Mexico) MEX	Giovani dos Santos	14	3	10+4	3	0	0
11	FW	(Norway) NOR	Ola Kamara	32	14	30+1	14	1	0
15	FW	(Costa Rica) CRC	Ariel Lassiter	9	2	1+6	0	1+1	2
38	FW	(United States) USA	Bradford Jamieson IV	8	1	3+3	0	2	1
51	FW	(United States) USA	Ethan Zubak	1	0	0	0	1	0
Players who have made an appearance or had a squad number this season but have left the club
22	DF	(Montenegro) MNE	Emrah Klimenta	3	0	2	0	1	0
88	MF	(Portugal) POR	João Pedro	5	0	1+2	0	1+1	0

=== Top scorers ===
Place	Position	Number	Name	MLS	Open Cup	Total
1	FW	9	(Sweden) Zlatan Ibrahimović	22	0	22
2	FW	11	(Norway) Ola Kamara	14	0	14
3	MF	7	(France) Romain Alessandrini	11	0	11
4	MF	19	(United States) Chris Pontius	5	0	5
5	MF	17	(United States) Sebastian Lletget	3	0	3
5	FW	10	(Mexico) Giovani dos Santos	3	0	3
7	MF	24	(Ghana) Emmanuel Boateng	2	0	2
7	FW	15	(United States) Ariel Lassiter	0	2	2
7	MF	8	(Mexico) Jonathan dos Santos	2	0	2
10	DF	28	(France) Michaël Ciani	1	0	1
10	DF	3	(England) Ashley Cole	1	0	1
10	FW	38	(United States) Bradford Jamieson	0	1	1
10	DF	25	(Venezuela) Rolf Feltscher	1	0	1
10	DF	4	(United States) David Romney	1	0	1
Total				66	3	69

== See also ==
- 2018 in American soccer
- 2018 LA Galaxy II season
