= Ethan Zubak =

American soccer player (born 1998)

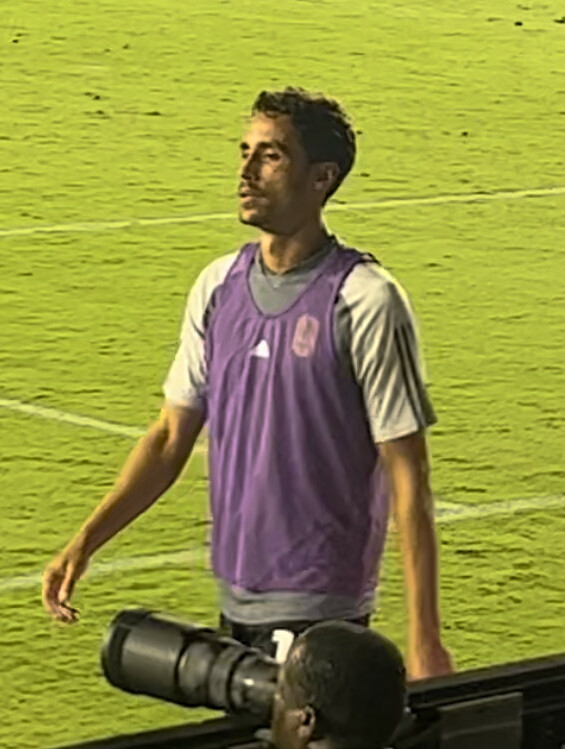
- Zubak warming up for Nashville SC in 2023

Personal information
- Date of birth: April 15, 1998 (age 28)
- Place of birth: Corona, California, United States
- Height: 6 ft 3 in (1.91 m)
- Position: Forward

Team information
- Current team: Orange County SC
- Number: 9

Youth career
- 2012–2013: Arsenal FC (California)
- 2013–2015: LA Galaxy

Senior career*
Years	Team	Apps	(Gls)
2015–2019	LA Galaxy II	104	(26)
2019–2021	LA Galaxy	36	(3)
2022–2023	Nashville SC	14	(3)
2024–	Orange County SC	81	(21)

International career^{‡}
2016–2017	United States U19	6	(1)
- * Club domestic league appearances and goals as of 13:54, 10 November 2026 (UTC) ‡ National team caps and goals as of May 10, 2017

Ethan Zubak (born April 15, 1998) is an American professional soccer player who plays as a forward for USL Championship club Orange County SC.

== Career ==
Zubak began his youth career with the Arsenal FC Academy in California before joining the LA Galaxy Academy in 2013. Zubak was part of the Galaxy U16 Academy team that won a National Championship in 2014. On August 9, 2015, Zubak made his professional debut for LA Galaxy II in a 2–1 defeat to Arizona United SC. He scored his first professional goal on April 2, 2016, against the Real Monarchs. He scored his first National Team goal on September 5, 2016, at the Stevan Vilotic Tournament in Topola, Serbia against Hungary.

On August 22, 2020, Zubak scored his first MLS goal against LAFC.

On December 12, 2021, Zubak was traded to Nashville SC in exchange for a first-round pick in the 2022 MLS SuperDraft. He left Nashville following the 2023 season.

== Career statistics ==
=== Club ===
As of match played November 5, 2020

Appearances and goals by club, season and competition
Club	Season	League			National cup		Continental		Other		Total	
Club	Season	Division	Apps	Goals	Apps	Goals	Apps	Goals	Apps	Goals	Apps	Goals
LA Galaxy II	2015	USL	1	0	—		—		—		1	0
LA Galaxy II	2016	USL	22	2	—		—		1 (Note: Appearance(s) in USL Playoffs)	0	23	2
LA Galaxy II	2017	USL	28	4	—		—		—		28	4
LA Galaxy II	2018	USL	31	11	—		—		—		31	11
LA Galaxy II	2019	USL Championship	20	9	—		—		1	0	21	9
LA Galaxy II	2020	USL Championship	0	0	—		—		—		0	0
LA Galaxy II	Total		102	26	0	0	0	0	2	0	104	26
LA Galaxy	2018	MLS	0	0	1	0	—		—		1	0
LA Galaxy	2019	MLS	3	0	2	0	2 (Note: Appearance(s) in Leagues Cup)	0	0	0	7	0
LA Galaxy	2020	MLS	15	2	—		—		—		15	2
LA Galaxy	Total		18	2	3	0	2	0	0	0	23	2
Career total			120	28	3	0	2	0	2	0	127	28

== Personal life ==
Zubak is a Christian. Zubak is married Katie Zubak. Zubak is of Indian descent through his mother.
