= Dave Romney =

American soccer player (born 1993)

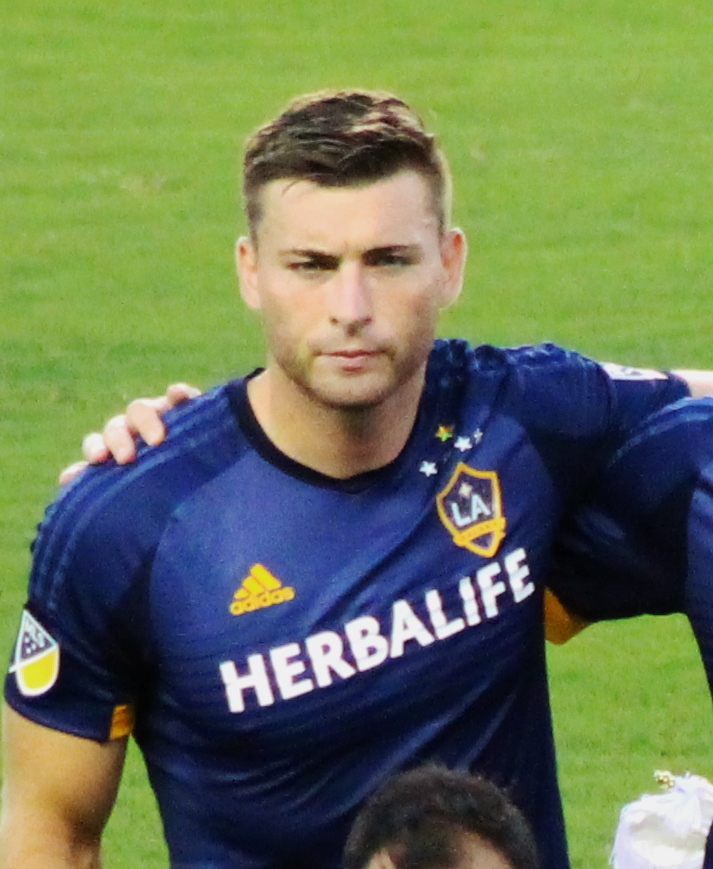
- Romney with LA Galaxy in 2015

Personal information
- Full name: David James Romney
- Date of birth: June 12, 1993 (age 33)
- Place of birth: Irvine, California, U.S.
- Height: 6 ft 2 in (1.88 m)
- Position: Defender

Team information
- Current team: San Jose Earthquakes
- Number: 4

College career
| Years | Team | Apps | (Gls) |
| 2011–2014 | San Francisco Dons | 72 | (5) |

Senior career*
| Years | Team | Apps | (Gls) |
| 2015 | San Francisco City | | |
| 2015–2019 | LA Galaxy II | 24 | (2) |
| 2015–2019 | LA Galaxy | 84 | (3) |
| 2020–2022 | Nashville SC | 87 | (4) |
| 2023–2024 | New England Revolution | 61 | (1) |
| 2025– | San Jose Earthquakes | 33 | (1) |

International career^{‡}
| 2015 | United States U23 | 1 | (0) |
- * Club domestic league appearances and goals as of 11 February 2026 ‡ National team caps and goals as of November 15, 2015

David James Romney (born June 12, 1993) is an American professional soccer player who plays as a defender for Major League Soccer club San Jose Earthquakes.

== Career ==
Born and raised in Irvine, California, Romney began his professional career with LA Galaxy II, having previously played in the U.S. Soccer Development Academy with the Irvine Strikers as well as the University of San Francisco men's soccer team and amateur club San Francisco City FC. He made his USL debut against Sacramento Republic FC in March 2015. He became the first LA Galaxy II player to sign a MLS contract when he was signed by LA Galaxy on August 5, 2015.

Romney was re-signed by the LA Galaxy at the beginning of the 2019 season.

On November 12, 2019, Romney was traded to Nashville SC ahead of their inaugural season in MLS. LA Galaxy received $225,000 in General Allocation Money and will receive an additional $50,000 in General Allocation Money if Romney meets certain performance-based metrics.

On January 5, 2023, Romney was traded to New England Revolution in exchange for a total of $525,000 in General Allocation Money. Romney scored his first goal for the Revolution in Major League Soccer play on September 30, 2023, in a 2–1 victory over Charlotte FC.

On October 21, 2023, Romney became only the second player in New England Revolution history to play every minute of a 34-game season, the first being José Gonçalves. Romney was also the only outfield player to play every minute of the 2023 MLS regular season. He was named Revolution team defender of the year for the 2023 season, and again for the 2024 season.

Romney, along with teammates Mark-Anthony Kaye and Ian Harkes, were traded to the San Jose Earthquakes on December 2, 2024 for "around" $500,000 General allocation money and an international roster spot, reuniting Romney with his former Revolution and Galaxy manager Bruce Arena.

== Personal life ==
Romney married his wife Jacqueline in 2023, they have three children together.

Romney is a distant relative of 2012 Republican Party presidential candidate, former governor of Massachusetts and former United States Senator from Utah, Mitt Romney.

== Career statistics ==
=== Club ===
As of match played March 17, 2024

Appearances and goals by club, season and competition
| Club | Season | League | | | National cup | | Continental | | Other | | Total | |
| Club | Season | Division | Apps | Goals | Apps | Goals | Apps | Goals | Apps | Goals | Apps | Goals |
|---|---|---|---|---|---|---|---|---|---|---|---|---|
| LA Galaxy II | 2015 | USL | 17 | 1 | — | | — | | — | | 17 | 1 |
| LA Galaxy II | 2016 | USL | 7 | 1 | — | | — | | — | | 7 | 1 |
| LA Galaxy II | Total | | 24 | 2 | — | | — | | — | | 24 | 2 |
| LA Galaxy | 2015 | MLS | 5 | 0 | — | | 2 (Note: Appearances in the International Champions Cup) | 0 | — | | 7 | 0 |
| LA Galaxy | 2016 | MLS | 10 | 0 | 4 | 1 | 5 (Note: Appearance(s) in CONCACAF Champions Cup) | 0 | — | | 19 | 1 |
| LA Galaxy | 2017 | MLS | 29 | 2 | 3 | 0 | — | | — | | 32 | 2 |
| LA Galaxy | 2018 | MLS | 28 | 1 | 2 | 0 | — | | — | | 30 | 1 |
| LA Galaxy | 2019 | MLS | 12 | 0 | 2 | 0 | — | | 4 (Note: Two appearances and one goal in Leagues Cup, two appearances in MLS Cup Playoffs) | 1 | 18 | 1 |
| LA Galaxy | Total | | 84 | 3 | 11 | 1 | 7 | 0 | 4 | 1 | 106 | 5 |
| Nashville SC | 2020 | MLS | 23 | 1 | — | | — | | 3 (Note: Appearance(s) in MLS Cup Playoffs) | 0 | 26 | 1 |
| Nashville SC | 2021 | MLS | 33 | 0 | — | | — | | — | | 33 | 0 |
| Nashville SC | 2022 | MLS | 31 | 3 | 3 | 0 | — | | 1 | 0 | 35 | 3 |
| Nashville SC | Total | | 87 | 4 | 3 | 0 | — | | 4 | 0 | 94 | 4 |
| New England Revolution | 2023 | MLS | 34 | 1 | 2 | 1 | — | | 6 (Note: Four appearances in Leagues Cup, two appearances in MLS Cup Playoffs) | 0 | 42 | 2 |
| New England Revolution | 2024 | MLS | 27 | 0 | — | | 6 | 0 | 2 | 0 | 35 | 0 |
| New England Revolution | Total | | 61 | 1 | 2 | 1 | 6 | 0 | 8 | 0 | 77 | 2 |
| Career total | | | 256 | 10 | 16 | 2 | 13 | 0 | 16 | 1 | 301 | 13 |
