= Ariel Lassiter =

Costa Rican footballer (born 1994)

- Lassiter with the Portland Timbers in 2026

Personal information
- Full name: Ariel Daniel Lassiter Acuña
- Date of birth: 27 September 1994 (age 32)
- Place of birth: Turrialba, Costa Rica
- Height: 1.78 m (5 ft 10 in)
- Positions: Forward; winger

Team information
- Current team: Portland Timbers
- Number: 7

Youth career
- 2009–2013: Albion SC

College career
Years	Team	Apps	(Gls)
2013	Cal Poly Mustangs	21	(5)

Senior career*
Years	Team	Apps	(Gls)
2014	GAIS	12	(1)
2015–2018	LA Galaxy II	58	(30)
2015–2018	LA Galaxy	25	(1)
2019–2020	Alajuelense	64	(24)
2020	→ Houston Dynamo (loan)	16	(3)
2021	Houston Dynamo	19	(0)
2022–2023	Inter Miami	38	(4)
2023–2024	CF Montréal	45	(4)
2024	Chicago Fire	7	(0)
2025–	Portland Timbers	21	(0)

International career^{‡}
2015	United States U23	2	(0)
2015	Costa Rica U23	5	(2)
2019–	Costa Rica	33	(2)
- * Club domestic league appearances and goals as of 5 October 2025 ‡ National team caps and goals as of 9 September 2025

Ariel Daniel Lassiter Acuña (born 27 September 1994) is a Costa Rican professional footballer who plays as a winger for Major League Soccer club Portland Timbers and the Costa Rica national team.

== Early life, youth, and college ==
Lassiter was born in Turrialba, Costa Rica, where his father Roy, a professional footballer, played for A.D. Carmelita. The Lassiter family moved to the United States after the elder Lassiter signed with the Tampa Bay Mutiny of Major League Soccer before eventually moving to Temecula, California when Ariel was 13. There, Lassiter attended Great Oak High School, where he played on the school soccer team for 4 years, captaining the team for 2 years. He received multiple accolades during his high school career, including being named two-time Inland Empire High School Player of the Year.

Lassiter played college soccer for the Cal Poly Mustangs. He had 5 goals and 4 assists from 21 appearances during his first season for the Mustangs, earning a spot on the Big West Conference All-Freshman team. He left Cal Poly after his freshman season.

== Club career ==
=== GAIS ===
In July 2014, Lassiter signed with GAIS in the Swedish Superettan. He made his debut for GAIS on 9 August 2014, playing 70 minutes in a 2–1 win over Husqvarna FF. On 23 August, he scored his first goal in a 2–0 win against Varbergs BoIS. Lassiter ended his first professional season with one goal from 12 matches.

=== LA Galaxy ===
On 29 January 2015, Lassiter signed with LA Galaxy II of the United Soccer League. He made his debut for Galaxy II on 22 March, coming on as a substitute in a 0–0 draw with Real Monarchs. Lassiter scored his first goal for Los Dos on 11 April to help Galaxy II to a 3–1 win over Sacramento Republic. He finished the regular season with 11 goals and one assist from 21 games, helping Galaxy II qualify for the playoffs. Lassiter scored four times in the playoffs as Los Dos reached the final, where they fell 2–1 to the Rochester Rhinos. He also scored once in the U.S. Open Cup as Galaxy II lost to Ventura County Fusion 2–1. The 2015 season also saw Lassiter make one appearance for the Galaxy first team, coming on as a substitute in a 3–0 loss to the Houston Dynamo in an MLS match on 25 July.

On 5 March 2016, the Galaxy announced Lassiter had signed a first-team contract. He started the season with Galaxy II, scoring two goals in a 2–0 win over Arizona United on 26 March. The following week, Lassiter got his first ever MLS start as he helped the Galaxy first team to a 0–0 draw with the Vancouver Whitecaps. He then started five straight games for the reserves before suffering a back injury that kept him out for two months. Lassiter returned from his injury and played with Galaxy II for the rest of their season, scoring nine goals and recording one assist from 16 games as he helped Los Dos reach the playoffs, where they lost 3–0 to Swope Park Rangers in their first game. After being eliminated from the playoffs, Lassiter returned to the Galaxy first team and played in the final two games of the regular season. The Galaxy qualified for the playoffs, but Lassiter did not appear in any of the three matches.

The 2017 season saw Lassiter split his time between the Galaxy first team and Galaxy II. On 14 June, he scored his first goal for the Galaxy senior team to help LA defeat Orange County SC 3–1 in a U.S. Open Cup match. He scored again on 28 June as the Galaxy defeated Sacramento Republic 2–0 to advance to the Open Cup Quarterfinals, where they fell 3–2 to the San Jose Earthquakes. On 23 July, Lassiter scored his first career MLS goal as the Galaxy lost 4–3 to the New England Revolution. He ended the season one goal from 14 MLS appearances, all coming from the bench, as well as three appearances and two goals in the Open Cup for the Galaxy first team. He also had nine appearances and five goals for Galaxy II during the season.

In 2018, Lassiter primarily featured for Galaxy II, scoring five goals and recording four assists from 12 appearances. He saw limited involvement with the Galaxy first team during 2018, making seven substitute appearances during league play and playing twice in the Open Cup, where he scored two goals.

On 26 November 2018, the Galaxy declined Lassiter's contract option for the 2019 season.

=== Alajuelense ===
On 18 December 2018, Lassiter signed with Costa Rican club Liga Deportiva Alajuelense. He made his debut for Alajuelense on 16 January 2019, in a 3–3 draw against C.F. Universidad de Costa Rica. He scored his first goal for Alajuelense on 27 February in a 4–2 win over Cartaginés. Lassiter ended his first season in Costa Rica with three goals from 16 games. Alajuelense finished the clausura season in 6th place, missing out on the playoffs by 2 points.

On 21 July 2019, Lassiter scored once to give Alajuelense a 1–0 win over Guadalupe F.C. in the opening match of the 2019 Apertura. The following game saw Lassiter score once and record an assist as Los Leones defeated Limón F.C. 2–1. He scored twice on 8 September to give Alajuelense a 2–0 win over A.D.R. Jicaral. Lassiter scored another brace on 6 October as Alajuelense defeated Deportivo Saprissa 5–2. He finished the Apertura regular season with 12 goals and five assists from 20 appearances, helping Alajuelense finish top of the table. Lassiter made four appearances in the playoffs as he helped Los Leones reach the final, where they lose 2–0 to C.S. Herediano. Since the playoff winner was different than the regular season winner, a two-legged grand final was held between Alajuelense and Herediano to determine the Apertura champion. Lassiter appeared in both legs, but Herediano won 5–4 on penalties after the teams played to a 2–2 aggregate score.

Alajuelense opened the 2020 Clausura on 12 January 2020, beating Limón 4–1 win Lassiter scoring once and adding an assist. On 4 February he scored twice as Los Leones beat Municipal Grecia 5–1. On 12 February, Lassiter scored in the 93rd minute to give Alajuelense a 3–2 win over Guadalupe. On 14 March, he had one goal and four assists to help Alajuelense defeat La U Universitarios 6–1. Lassiter finished the Clausura regular season with eight goals and nine assists from 18 appearances, helping Los Leones finish third in the table and qualify for the playoffs. Lassiter made four appearances and scored once in the playoffs as Alajuelense reached the final, where the fell to Saprissa 3–0 over two legs. On 4 May 2020, Lassiter was signed a new contract with Alajuelense until 2023.

=== Houston Dynamo ===
On 17 August 2020, Lassiter returned to MLS by going on loan to the Houston Dynamo. Houston sent $50,000 in general allocation money to the LA Galaxy to acquire his MLS rights. He made his Dynamo debut on 2 September, coming on as a substitute and scoring twice to give Houston a 3–0 win over Minnesota United. On 7 October Lassiter recorded his first assist for the Dynamo in a 2–0 win over Texas Derby rivals FC Dallas. On 28 October he scored once in a 2–1 loss to LAFC. Lassiter ended the season with three goals and one assist from 16 appearances. It was a poor season for Houston overall, finishing bottom of the Western Conference and missing out on the playoffs.

On 1 December 2020, the Dynamo announced that they had exercised their purchase option to make Lassiter's move permanent. While the official transfer fee was not announced, it was reportedly around $400,000. Lassiter made 19 appearances during his second season in Houston as the Dynamo finished last in the West for the second straight season.

=== Inter Miami ===
On 16 December 2021, Lassiter was traded by Houston to Inter Miami for $100,000 of General Allocation Money.

=== CF Montréal ===
On 12 April 2023, Lassiter was traded with teammate Bryce Duke to CF Montréal for Kamal Miller and $1.3 million in General Allocation Money.

=== Chicago Fire ===
Lassiter was traded to Chicago Fire on 14 August 2024 in exchange for up to $150,000 in General Allocation Money.

=== Portland Timbers ===
On 23 December 2024, Lassiter was signed by Portland Timbers via free agency.

== International career ==
Born in Costa Rica and raised in the United States, Lassiter was eligible to play for both national teams. He represented the United States U-23 national team twice in friendlies during 2015. Later that year, he switched to the Costa Rican U-23 national team and represented them at the 2015 Toulon Tournament.

He made his senior debut for Costa Rica on 22 March 2019, in a friendly against Guatemala, coming on as a 63rd-minute substitute for Waylon Francis.

On 1 July 2021, Lassiter was included in Luis Fernando Suárez's squad for the 2021 CONCACAF Gold Cup. Lassiter scored his first senior international goal on 12 July in a 3–1 over Guadeloupe in the Gold Cup group stage. He made four appearances, scored one goal, and had one assist at the Gold Cup, helping Costa Rica reach the quarterfinals.

== Career statistics ==
=== Club ===
As of 4 October 2025

Appearances and goals by club, season and competition
Club	Season	League			National cup (Note: Includes US Open Cup, Canadian Championship)		Continental		Other		Total	
Club	Season	Division	Apps	Goals	Apps	Goals	Apps	Goals	Apps	Goals	Apps	Goals
GAIS	2014	Superettan	12	1	—		—		—		12	1
LA Galaxy II	2015	United Soccer League	21	11	1	1	—		3 (Note: Appearances in USL play-offs)	4	25	16
LA Galaxy II	2016	United Soccer League	16	9	—		—		1	0	17	9
LA Galaxy II	2017	United Soccer League	9	5	—		—		—		9	5
LA Galaxy II	2018	United Soccer League	12	5	—		—		—		12	5
LA Galaxy II	Total		58	30	1	1	—		4	4	63	35
LA Galaxy	2015	Major League Soccer	1	0	0	0	0	0	0	0	1	0
LA Galaxy	2016	Major League Soccer	3	0	0	0	0	0	0	0	3	0
LA Galaxy	2017	Major League Soccer	14	1	3	2	—		—		17	3
LA Galaxy	2018	Major League Soccer	7	0	2	2	—		—		9	2
LA Galaxy	Total		25	1	5	4	0	0	0	0	30	5
Alajuelense	2018–19	Liga FPD	16	3	—		—		—		16	3
Alajuelense	2019–20	Liga FPD	48	21	—		—		—		48	21
Alajuelense	Total		64	24	—		—		—		64	24
Houston Dynamo (loan)	2020	Major League Soccer	16	3	—		—		—		16	3
Houston Dynamo	2021	Major League Soccer	19	0	—		—		—		19	0
Houston Dynamo	Total		35	3	—		—		—		35	3
Inter Miami	2022	Major League Soccer	31	4	3	2	—		—		34	6
Inter Miami	2023	Major League Soccer	7	0	0	0	—		—		7	0
Inter Miami	Total		38	4	3	2	—		—		41	6
CF Montréal	2023	Major League Soccer	25	1	4	1	—		2 (Note: Appearances in Leagues Cup)	0	31	2
CF Montréal	2024	Major League Soccer	20	3	2	0	—		3	0	25	3
CF Montréal	Total		45	4	6	1	—		5	0	56	5
Chicago Fire	2024	Major League Soccer	7	0	0	0	—		0	0	7	0
Portland Timbers	2025-26	Major League Soccer	40	4	2	0	—		3	2	26	2
Career total			305	67	17	8	0	0	12	6	334	81

=== International ===
As of match played 9 September 2025

National Team	Year	Apps	Goals
Costa Rica	2019	5	0
Costa Rica	2020	2	0
Costa Rica	2021	10	1
Costa Rica	2024	11	1
Costa Rica	2025	5	0
Total		33	2

Scores and results lost Costa Rica's goal tally first.

No.	Date	Venue	Opponent	Score	Result	Competition
1.	12 July 2021	Exploria Stadium, Orlando, United States	Guadeloupe	2–0	3–1	2021 CONCACAF Gold Cup
2.	5 September 2024	Estadio Nacional, San José, Costa Rica	Guadeloupe	2–0	3–0	2024–25 CONCACAF Nations League A
