= Sheanon Williams =

American soccer player (born 1990)

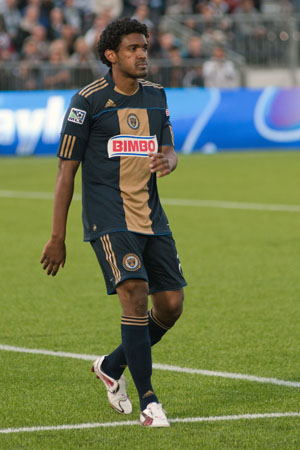
- Williams with Philadelphia Union in 2011

Personal information
- Full name: Sheanon Antoine Williams
- Date of birth: March 17, 1990 (age 36)
- Place of birth: Boston, Massachusetts, United States
- Height: 5 ft 11 in (1.80 m)
- Position: Defender

Youth career
- –2005: FCGB Bolts
- 2005–2007: IMG Soccer Academy

College career
Years	Team	Apps	(Gls)
2008	North Carolina Tar Heels		

Senior career*
Years	Team	Apps	(Gls)
2008–2009	Carolina Dynamo	23	(8)
2010	Harrisburg City Islanders	19	(3)
2010–2015	Philadelphia Union	141	(7)
2015–2016	Houston Dynamo	36	(0)
2017	Vancouver Whitecaps FC	15	(0)
2018	LA Galaxy	8	(0)
2018	→ LA Galaxy II (loan)	3	(0)

International career^{‡}
2007	United States U17	4	(0)
2009	United States U20	2	(0)
Medal record
Representing United States
Runner-up	CONCACAF U-20 Championship	2009
- * Club domestic league appearances and goals as of November 3, 2018 ‡ National team caps and goals as of August 3, 2015

Sheanon Antoine Williams (born March 17, 1990) is an American former professional soccer player who played right-back.

== Career ==
=== College and amateur ===
Williams attended The Rivers School in Weston, Massachusetts and played club soccer for FC Greater Boston Bolts before being offered a place at the IMG Soccer Academy in Bradenton, Florida in 2005 as a member of the U.S. Under-17 National Team Residency Program. He earned NSCAA/adidas Youth All-America honors in 2006 and 2007, and was named to the 2007 PARADE High School All-America squad.

Williams enrolled at the University of North Carolina in January 2008, and subsequently played one year of college soccer for the Tar Heels, before leaving school a year early to attempt to secure a professional contract in Europe.

Despite performing well on trial with teams such as Vfl Wolfsburg, Williams was unable to secure a contract, and returned to the United States in 2009. He played with the Carolina Dynamo of the USL Premier Development League, earning All-Eastern Conference honors after scoring six goals and 16 points in 12 games.

=== Professional ===
After training with Major League Soccer club Real Salt Lake during the latter half of 2009 and early 2010, Williams turned professional in 2010 when he joined the Harrisburg City Islanders in the USL Second Division. He made his professional debut and scored his first professional goal in Harrisburg's opening day 2–2 draw with the Richmond Kickers. After training with the Philadelphia Union, Williams eventually signed with the team in August 2010. In Week 7 of the 2011 MLS season, Williams was named to the MLS Team of the Week for his performance against the San Jose Earthquakes. He again gained Team of the Week honors in Week 16 of the season.

In February 2012, Philadelphia signed Williams to a contract extension through the 2015 season.

In July 2015, Philadelphia traded Williams, along with an international roster slot, to Houston Dynamo in exchange for allocation money and future considerations.

On December 13, 2016, Williams was traded by the Dynamo to the Vancouver Whitecaps FC in exchange for general allocation money. Williams was suspended from the team on June 16, 2017, for an off-field assault earlier in the day, but the charges were stayed three days later.

Williams joined LA Galaxy as a free agent in June 2018. Williams was released by LA Galaxy at the end of their 2018 season.

=== International ===
Williams played with the US National U-17 team from 2005 to 2007, and was a member of the United States squad at the 2007 CONCACAF U17 Tournament and the 2007 FIFA U-17 World Cup in Korea. He moved on to play for the US National U-20 team in 2008, and played at the 2009 FIFA U-20 World Cup in Egypt.

== Career statistics ==
Appearances and goals by club, season and competition
Club	Season	League			Cup (Note: Includes US Open Cup and Canadian Championship)		Playoffs		Continental (Note: Includes CONCACAF Champions League)		Total	
Club	Season	Division	Apps	Goals	Apps	Goals	Apps	Goals	Apps	Goals	Apps	Goals
Harrisburg City Islanders	2010	USL Second Division	19	3	3	0	0	0	—		22	3
Philadelphia Union	2010	Major League Soccer	8	0	0	0	—		—		8	0
Philadelphia Union	2011	Major League Soccer	32	1	1	0	2	0	—		35	1
Philadelphia Union	2012	Major League Soccer	28	1	2	0	—		—		30	1
Philadelphia Union	2013	Major League Soccer	32	2	2	0	—		—		34	2
Philadelphia Union	2014	Major League Soccer	24	3	5	0	—		—		29	3
Philadelphia Union	2015	Major League Soccer	17	0	2	0	—		—		19	0
Philadelphia Union	Total		141	7	12	0	2	0	0	0	155	7
Houston Dynamo	2015	Major League Soccer	14	0	0	0	—		—		14	0
Houston Dynamo	2016	Major League Soccer	22	0	2	0	—		—		24	0
Houston Dynamo	Total		36	0	2	0	0	0	0	0	38	0
Vancouver Whitecaps	2017	Major League Soccer	15	0	0	0	0	0	3	0	18	0
LA Galaxy	2018	Major League Soccer	8	0	0	0	—		—		8	0
LA Galaxy II (loan)	2018	United Soccer League	3	0	—		—		—		3	0
Career total			222	10	17	0	2	0	3	0	244	10
