= Servando Carrasco =

American soccer player (born 1988)

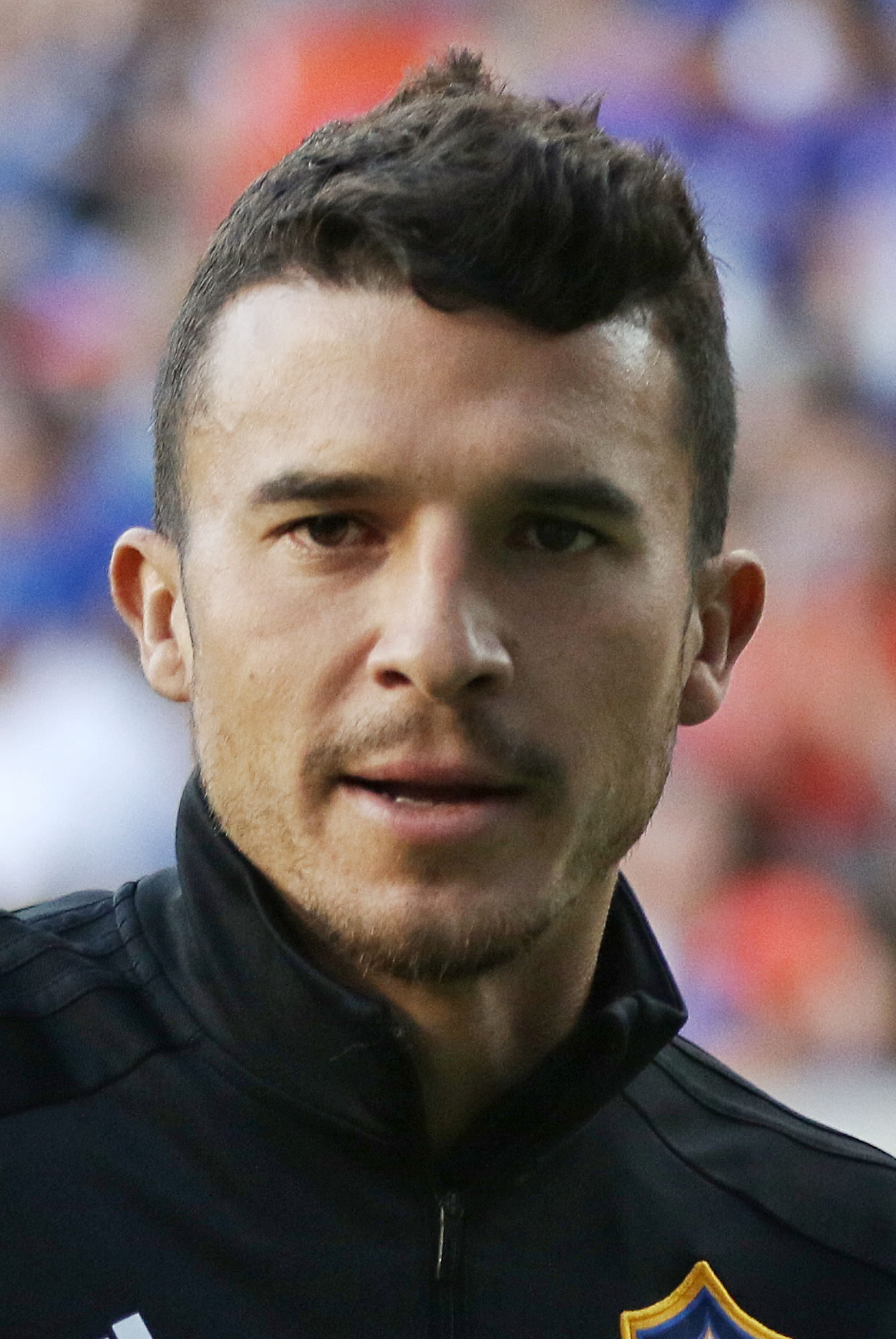
- Carrasco with LA Galaxy in 2019

Personal information
- Full name: Servando Carrasco
- Date of birth: August 13, 1988 (age 38)
- Place of birth: Coronado, California, U.S.
- Height: 5 ft 10 in (1.78 m)
- Position: Defensive midfielder

Youth career
- 1996–2006: San Diego Surf

College career
Years	Team	Apps	(Gls)
2007–2010	California Golden Bears	73	(13)

Senior career*
Years	Team	Apps	(Gls)
2011–2013	Seattle Sounders FC	40	(1)
2013–2014	Houston Dynamo	19	(0)
2015	Sporting Kansas City	9	(0)
2015–2017	Orlando City SC	58	(1)
2018–2019	LA Galaxy	35	(0)
2020	Fort Lauderdale CF	12	(0)
Total		173	(2)
- * Club domestic league appearances and goals

Servando Carrasco (born August 13, 1988) is an American former professional soccer player who played as a defensive midfielder.

== Career ==
Carrasco spent his childhood living in Tijuana, Mexico, and attended St. Augustine High School in San Diego, California. Until the age of 19, he played for his high school and San Diego Surf. During that time, he was recognized as Western League Player of the Year, CIF Player of the Year, and The San Diego Union-Tribune All-County Player of the Year. He also participated in the Olympic Development Program and the Premier Development Program.

=== College ===
In 2007, Carrasco accepted a scholarship at the University of California, Berkeley. During his first year, Carrasco recorded seven points on two goals and three assists. He scored his second goal of the season against Washington in the opening minutes of the game; he added an insurance goal for Cal against San Diego increasing the Bears' lead to 2–0; and he earned several assists against UCLA, Stanford and University of San Francisco.

In 2008, Carrasco was named All-Pac-10 second team and Pac-10 All-Academic second-team. He started in all but one game and scored three goals for the year, tying him for second best on the team. He was one of two Cal players to have seven assists during the season, including one assist on the game-winning goal against Oregon State University.

In 2009, despite suffering an ankle injury that sidelined him for a number of games, Carrasco still earned a second straight All-Pac-10 second-team selection and a Pac-10 All-Academic honorable mention. He had one goal.

In 2010, Carrasco was senior co-captain of the Berkeley squad with good friend A. J. Soares, a defender with Viking FK. He was named NSCAA Third Team Far West Region, First Team All-Pac-10, Third Team Pac-10 All American, and Pac-10 All-Academic honorable mention. Carrasco scored seven goals and had three assists.

Throughout his 4 years at UC Berkeley, he scored 13 goals.

=== Professional ===
On January 13, 2011, Carrasco was drafted in the second round (27th overall) of the 2011 MLS SuperDraft by Seattle Sounders FC. He signed with Seattle on March 2, 2011, and made his debut on March 19, in a game against the New York Red Bulls.

Carrasco scored his first career goal for Seattle on June 8, 2013, on a penalty kick in a 3–2 win against Vancouver Whitecaps FC. Carrasco was traded to the Houston Dynamo from Seattle in exchange for Adam Moffat on September 13, 2013. Carrasco was then traded from the Houston to Sporting Kansas City for the 30th pick in the 2015 MLS SuperDraft. On July 20, 2015, Carrasco was traded to Orlando City SC in exchange for midfielder Amobi Okugo. On April 9, 2017, Carrasco scored his first goal for Orlando and second overall career goal when he headed home from a corner in a 1–0 win v New York Red Bulls.

At the end of the 2017 season Carrasco entered the 2017 MLS Re-Entry Draft after Orlando City declined his contract option. On December 21, 2017, he was selected by LA Galaxy in Stage Two of the draft. He signed with the club on January 11, 2018. After his contract was declined at the end of the 2019 season, Carrasco signed with Fort Lauderdale CF in USL League One.

== Personal life ==
While born in the United States, Carrasco spent most of his early childhood growing up in the nearby Mexican city of Tijuana. When he was seven, his family moved back to the United States. His mother, Gloria, is a two-time survivor of breast cancer. On December 31, 2014, Carrasco married Alex Morgan, a professional soccer player for the United States women's national team. The couple's first child, Charlie Elena Carrasco, was born on May 7, 2020. Morgan announced she was pregnant with the couple's second child in September 2024. On March 30, 2025, he shared on a joint Instagram post with Morgan the birth of a son, Enzo.

== Career statistics ==
As of October 07, 2020

All-time club performance
Club	Season	League			Playoffs		U.S. Open Cup		CONCACAF		Total	
Club	Season	Division	Apps	Goals	Apps	Goals	Apps	Goals	Apps	Goals	Apps	Goals
Seattle Sounders FC	2011	Major League Soccer	12	0	—		1	0	6	0	19	0
Seattle Sounders FC	2012	Major League Soccer	9	0	—		3	0	3	0	15	0
Seattle Sounders FC	2013	Major League Soccer	19	1	—		1	0	—		20	1
Seattle Sounders FC	Total		40	1	—		5	0	9	0	54	1
Houston Dynamo	2013	Major League Soccer	3	0	1	0	—		2	0	6	0
Houston Dynamo	2014	Major League Soccer	16	0	—		2	0	—		18	0
Houston Dynamo	Total		19	0	1	0	2	0	2	0	24	0
Sporting Kansas City	2015	Major League Soccer	9	0	—		—		—		9	0
Orlando City SC	2015	Major League Soccer	12	0	—		1	0	—		13	0
Orlando City SC	2016	Major League Soccer	31	0	—		2	0	—		33	0
Orlando City SC	2017	Major League Soccer	15	1	—		1	0	—		16	1
Orlando City SC	Total		58	1	—		4	0	—		62	1
LA Galaxy	2018	Major League Soccer	19	0	—		2	0	—		21	0
LA Galaxy	2019	Major League Soccer	16	0	—		2	0	—		18	0
LA Galaxy	Total		35	0	—		4	0	—		39	0
Fort Lauderdale CF	2020	USL League One	12	0	0	0	0	0	0	0	12	0
Career total			173	2	1	0	15	0	11	0	200	2
