= Miguel Aguilar (Mexican footballer) =

Mexican footballer (born 1993)

Personal information
- Date of birth: 30 August 1993 (age 33)
- Place of birth: Ciudad Juárez, Mexico
- Height: 1.75 m (5 ft 9 in)
- Position: Midfielder

Youth career
- 2009–2010: CASA Boca
- 2011–2014: San Francisco Dons

Senior career*
Years	Team	Apps	(Gls)
2014	Portland Timbers U23s	8	(1)
2015–2016	D.C. United	23	(0)
2015	→ Richmond Kickers (loan)	1	(0)
2016	→ Richmond Kickers (loan)	14	(1)
2017–2018	LA Galaxy II	30	(3)
- * Club domestic league appearances and goals as of 09:38, 16 October 2018 (UTC)

Miguel Aguilar (born 30 August 1993) is a Mexican professional footballer.

== College and amateur soccer ==
Aguilar graduated from Encina High School in 2011. He played college soccer at the University of San Francisco, where he made a total of 73 appearances and tallied 15 goals and 9 assists. While in college, he was a youth coach for USL League Two side San Francisco Glens' academy.

He also spent the 2014 season with Portland Timbers U23s in the Premier Development League.

== Professional career ==
=== D.C. United ===
Aguilar was drafted in the first round (17th overall) of the 2015 MLS SuperDraft by D.C. United and signed a professional contract with the club. He made his professional debut on 26 February in a 5–2 defeat to Alajuelense in the first leg of the CONCACAF Champions League quarterfinal. On 19 August 2015, Aguilar scored his first professional goal against Árabe Unido in the 2015–16 CONCACAF Champions League group stage.

=== LA Galaxy II ===
On 12 December 2016, Aguilar was traded by D.C. along with a fourth-round pick in the 2019 MLS SuperDraft to LA Galaxy in exchange for LA's fourth-round pick in the 2018 MLS SuperDraft. On 18 December 2017, Aguilar signed a new contract with the team after being sidelined for the nearly the whole 2017 season, due to an ACL injury. After the 2018 season, Aguilar's contract ran out.
