= Alex Mendez =

American soccer player (born 2000)

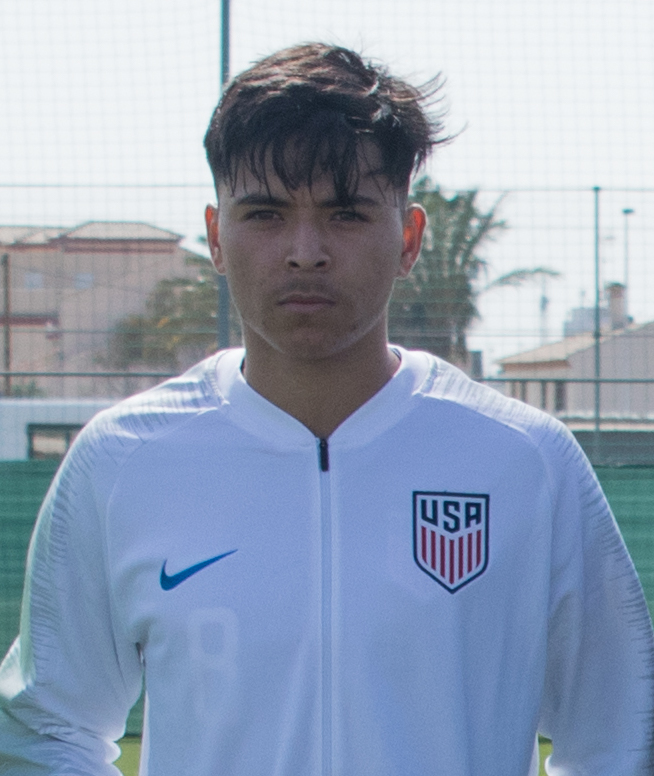
- Mendez with the United States U20 in 2019

Personal information
- Full name: Alex Mendez
- Date of birth: September 6, 2000 (age 26)
- Place of birth: Los Angeles, California, United States
- Height: 1.78 m (5 ft 10 in)
- Position: Midfielder

Team information
- Current team: El Paso Locomotive
- Number: 19

Youth career
- 2015–2018: LA Galaxy
- 2019: SC Freiburg

Senior career*
Years	Team	Apps	(Gls)
2017–2018	LA Galaxy II	12	(1)
2019	SC Freiburg	0	(0)
2019–2021	Jong Ajax	39	(3)
2021–2024	Vizela	69	(2)
2024–2025	Juárez	5	(0)
2025	Tampa Bay Rowdies	8	(1)
2026–	El Paso Locomotive	28	(9)

International career^{‡}
2017	United States U17	7	(1)
2018–2019	United States U20	14	(8)
2019	United States U23	4	(0)
- * Club domestic league appearances and goals as of 21:06, 8 November 2026 (UTC) ‡ National team caps and goals as of August 11, 2020

Alex Mendez (born September 6, 2000) is an American professional soccer player who plays as a midfielder for USL Championship club El Paso Locomotive FC.

== Club career ==
=== LA Galaxy ===
Mendez made his professional debut for USL Championship club LA Galaxy II in a 1–0 win against Orange County SC on August 3, 2017, coming on as a 34th-minute substitute for Andre Ulrich Zanga.

=== SC Freiburg ===
On October 23, 2018, Mendez announced that he had signed a professional contract for the Bundesliga club SC Freiburg in Germany.

Mendez scored three goals in 12 appearances in the U19 Bundesliga.

=== Ajax ===
On July 30, 2019, Mendez was signed by Ajax on a three-year deal. He made his official debut playing for the reserves team Jong Ajax in the Dutch Eerste Divisie, the 2nd-tier of professional football in the Netherlands, in a match against N.E.C. which ended in a 3–3 deadlock.

=== Vizela ===
On July 3, 2021, it was announced that Mendez would transfer to Portuguese club F.C. Vizela for an undisclosed transfer fee.

On August 6, 2021, Mendez made his debut as a starter in the Primeira Liga season opener in a 3–0 loss at home against Sporting CP.

=== Tampa Bay Rowdies ===
In September 2025, Mendez joined the Tampa Bay Rowdies of the USL Championship.

=== El Paso Locomotive ===
On February 26, 2026, El Paso Locomotive announced they had acquired Mendez via transfer from Tampa Bay Rowdies.

== International career ==
Mendez has been capped by the United States at the under-17, under-20, and under-23 levels.

In 2018, Mendez was awarded the Young Player of the Year award for the United States.

== Personal life ==
Born in the United States, Mendez is of Mexican descent.

== Honors ==
United States U20

- CONCACAF U-20 Championship: 2018

Individual

- CONCACAF U-20 Championship Best XI: 2018
- CONCACAF U-20 Championship Golden Ball: 2018
- US Soccer Young Male Player of the Year: 2018
- IFFHS CONCACAF Youth (U20) Best XI: 2020
