= Emmanuel Appiah (footballer) =

Ghanaian professional footballer

Emmanuel (Eman) Appiah
Personal information
- Date of birth: September 26, 1993 (age 33)
- Place of birth: Sampa, Ghana
- Height: 1.76 m (5 ft 9 in)
- Position: Midfielder

College career
| Years | Team | Apps | (Gls) |
| 2011–2015 | Cincinnati Bearcats | 65 | (7) |

Senior career*
| Years | Team | Apps | (Gls) |
| 2013 | GPS Portland Phoenix | 10 | (0) |
| 2016 | Colorado Rapids | 0 | (0) |
| 2016 | → Charlotte Independence (loan) | 2 | (0) |
| 2016 | Sporting Kansas City | 1 | (0) |
| 2016 | → Swope Park Rangers (loan) | 6 | (0) |
| 2017 | Saint Louis FC | 10 | (1) |
| 2018 | LA Galaxy II | 20 | (2) |
| 2020 | AC Kajaani | 19 | (3) |
- * Club domestic league appearances and goals as of 21 November 2020

Emmanuel (Eman) Appiah (born September 26, 1993) is a Ghanaian professional footballer.

== Career ==
Appiah began his soccer career in the United States playing club soccer for Blast FC in Columbus, Ohio. He is a 2011 graduate of Westerville Central High School. Following, Appiah spent five years playing college soccer at the University of Cincinnati between 2011 and 2015.

While at Cincinnati, Appiah appeared for Premier Development League side GPS Portland Phoenix in 2013.

Appiah was drafted 15th overall in the 2016 MLS SuperDraft by Colorado Rapids.

He was loaned to Charlotte Independence on March 15, 2016.

He was released by Colorado on June 30, 2016. He signed with MLS side Sporting Kansas City on July 12, 2016.

On July 26, 2017, Appiah signed with United Soccer League side Saint Louis FC until the end of the 2017 season.

On March 14, 2018, Appiah joined USL Championship side LA Galaxy II.

Following over a year without a professional club, Appiah joined Finnish side AC Kajaani in June 2020.
