= Ian Lonergan =

American soccer player

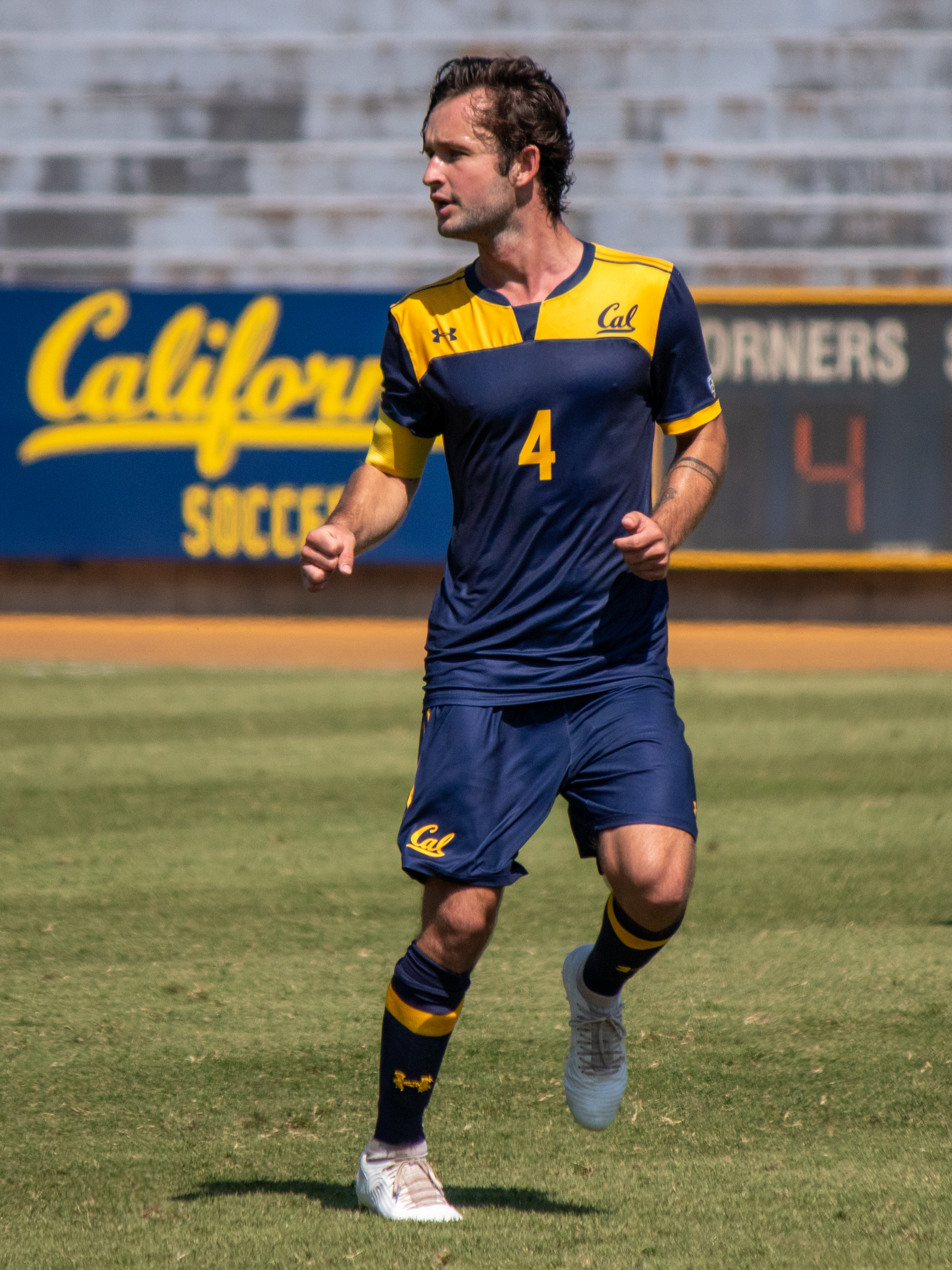
- Lonergan in 2021

Personal information
- Date of birth: July 16, 1999 (age 27)
- Place of birth: Manhattan Beach, California, United States
- Height: 1.76 m (5 ft 9 in)
- Position: Defender

Team information
- Current team: California Golden Bears
- Number: 4

Youth career
- 2013–2018: LA Galaxy

College career
| Years | Team | Apps | (Gls) |
| 2018–2022 | California Golden Bears | 57 | (0) |

Senior career*
| Years | Team | Apps | (Gls) |
| 2017–2018 | LA Galaxy II | 10 | (0) |
- * Club domestic league appearances and goals as of February 27, 2025

Ian Lonergan (born July 16, 1999) was an American college soccer player who played as a defender for the University of California, Berkeley.

== Career ==
=== College ===
Ahead of the 2018 NCAA Division I men's soccer season, Longergan signed a National Letter of Intent to play for the University of California, Berkeley men's soccer program. During his freshman year he became an immediate starter, making his college soccer debut and start on August 24, 2018, against Detroit Mercy.

=== Professional ===
After being with the LA Galaxy academy since playing with their U-14 side, Lonergan appeared for United Soccer League club LA Galaxy II as an amateur player.
