= Robert Castellanos =

American soccer player (born 1998)

Personal information
- Full name: Robert Castellanos
- Date of birth: May 11, 1998 (age 28)
- Place of birth: Palmdale, California, United States
- Height: 1.88 m (6 ft 2 in)
- Position: Defender

Team information
- Current team: Irapuato
- Number: 32

Youth career
- 2015–2016: Atlas
- 2016–2017: América

Senior career*
Years	Team	Apps	(Gls)
2017	LA Galaxy II	16	(0)
2018–2020	Rio Grande Valley Toros	37	(2)
2021–2022	Nashville	1	(1)
2022	→ Tampa Bay Rowdies (loan)	10	(1)
2023	KuPS	0	(0)
2023–2024	Sporting Kansas City	26	(2)
2023	Sporting Kansas City II	4	(0)
2025	Tampa Bay Rowdies	25	(1)
2026–	Irapuato	0	(0)

International career^{‡}
2016	United States U20	2	(0)
- * Club domestic league appearances and goals as of October 25, 2025 ‡ National team caps and goals as of April 14, 2017

Robert Castellanos (born May 11, 1998) is an American professional soccer player who plays as a defender for Liga de Expansión MX club Irapuato.

== Career ==
=== Professional ===
Castellanos was born in Palmdale, California and attended Palmdale High School. On February 14, 2017, he signed with United Soccer League club LA Galaxy II out of the youth academy of Club Atlas of the Liga MX.

After three seasons with Rio Grande Valley FC, the club declined their contract option on Castellanos following their 2020 season.

On February 17, 2021, Castellanos signed with MLS side Nashville SC. Castellanos was loaned to USL Championship side Tampa Bay Rowdies on March 11, 2022. Following the 2022 season, his contract option was declined by Nashville.

On 26 January 2023, Castellanos signed for Finnish club Kuopion Palloseura (KuPS) ahead of the 2023 season with the option to extend the deal for a further year.

After just three Finnish League Cup appearances for KuPS, Castellanos returned to the United States on February 17, 2023, signing with MLS side Sporting Kansas City.

On January 25, 2025, Castellanos signed with USL Championship club Tampa Bay Rowdies on a permanent contract.

=== International ===
In August 2016, Castellanos was called into a camp by the United States at the U20 level.
