= Jonathan Levin (footballer) =

Mexican footballer (born 1993)

Personal information
- Full name: Jonathan Levin Kolangui
- Date of birth: 6 May 1993 (age 33)
- Place of birth: Álvaro Obregón, Mexico City, Mexico
- Height: 1.82 m (5 ft 11 1/2 in)
- Position: Midfielder

Team information
- Current team: Miami FC
- Number: 17

Senior career*
Years	Team	Apps	(Gls)
2013–2014	Pachuca	0	(0)
2014–2015	Puebla	0	(0)
2015–2016	Jaguares de Chiapas	0	(0)
2016–2017	Veracruz	0	(0)
2017–2018	Tulsa Roughnecks	22	(0)
2019–2020	Las Vegas Lights	13	(0)
2021–2022	Phoenix Rising	5	(0)
2024	Arizona Monsoon	5	(0)
2025	Oaxaca	7	(0)
2025	Venados	0	(0)
2026–	Miami FC	4	(0)
- * Club domestic league appearances and goals as of November 7, 2026

Jonathan Levin Kolangui (born 6 May 1993) is a Mexican professional footballer who plays as a midfielder for Miami FC in the USL Championship. He is Jewish.

== See also ==
- List of select Jewish football (association; soccer) players
