= Jean Jospin Engola =

Cameroonian footballer

Personal information
- Full name: Jean Jospin Engola
- Date of birth: October 29, 1997 (age 29)
- Place of birth: Yaoundé, Cameroon
- Height: 1.90 m (6 ft 3 in)
- Position: Defender

Senior career*
Years	Team	Apps	(Gls)
- Kadji Sports Academy
2017–2018	→ LA Galaxy II (loan)	45	(2)
- * Club domestic league appearances and goals as of 09:48, 16 October 2018 (UTC)

Jean Jospin Engola (born 29 October 1997) is a Cameroonian footballer who plays as a centre-back for Zanzibar Premier League club JKU S.C.

== Career ==
After spending time in the Kadji Sports Academy Engola signed on loan with LA Galaxy II, a USL affiliate club of LA Galaxy.
