= Jonathan Hernandez (soccer) =

American soccer player (born 1997)

Personal information
- Full name: Jonathan Hernandez Silva
- Date of birth: April 29, 1997 (age 29)
- Place of birth: Pasadena, California, U.S.
- Height: 1.75 m (5 ft 9 in)
- Positions: Midfielder; right back

Youth career
- 2014: Chivas USA
- 2015–2016: LA Galaxy

College career
Years	Team	Apps	(Gls)
2016	Mt. San Antonio College	21	(1)

Senior career*
Years	Team	Apps	(Gls)
2017–2018	LA Galaxy II	30	(1)
2019	Kitchee	2	(0)
- * Club domestic league appearances and goals as of 4 May 2019

Jonathan Hernandez (born April 29, 1997) is an American former soccer player.

== Career ==
=== LA Galaxy II ===
On 6 May 2017, Hernandez signed with United Soccer League club LA Galaxy II.

=== Kitchee ===
On 29 March 2019, Hernandez joined Hong Kong Premier League club Kitchee.

== Honors ==
=== Club ===
Kitchee

- Hong Kong FA Cup: 2018–19
