= John Requejo =

American professional soccer player (born 1996)

Personal information
- Full name: John Anthony Requejo, Jr.
- Date of birth: May 23, 1996 (age 30)
- Place of birth: Santa Barbara, California, United States
- Height: 1.74 m (5 ft 9 in)
- Position: Left back

Team information
- Current team: Flower City Union

Youth career
- 2010–2014: Real So Cal

Senior career*
Years	Team	Apps	(Gls)
2014–2017	Tijuana	2	(0)
2017	→ Dorados (loan)	3	(0)
2018–2019	LA Galaxy II	35	(0)
2021	Chicago House	8	(0)
2023	Flower City Union	12	(0)

International career^{‡}
2012–2013	United States U17	31	(1)
2014–2015	United States U20	19	(0)
- * Club domestic league appearances and goals as of January 15, 2022 ‡ National team caps and goals as of December 19, 2014

John Anthony Requejo Jr. (born May 23, 1996) is an American professional soccer player who plays for Flower City Union in the National Independent Soccer Association.

== Career ==
=== Club ===
Requejo signed with Club Tijuana upon turning 18 in 2014, having previously signed a letter of intent to play for the University of California, Los Angeles. He was ranked as a top recruit in the class of 2014 by TopDrawerSoccer.

He made his professional debut in a Copa MX match against Coras de Tepic.

Requejo signed with Flower City Union for the 2023 NISA Season

=== International ===
Requejo was a regular for the United States U17 and has appeared with the United States U20 squad.
