= Jefrey Payeras =

American-born Guatemalan footballer

Personal information
- Date of birth: October 16, 1993 (age 33)
- Place of birth: Hawthorne, California, United States
- Height: 6 ft 2 in (1.88 m)
- Position: Defender

Youth career
- 2011–2012: LA Galaxy

College career
| Years | Team | Apps | (Gls) |
| 2012 | Cerritos Falcons | | |

Senior career*
| Years | Team | Apps | (Gls) |
| 2013–2017 | Municipal | 20 | (1) |
| 2015 | → Orange County Blues (loan) | 9 | (0) |
| 2016 | → LA Galaxy II (loan) | 26 | (1) |
| 2017–2018 | LA Galaxy II | 9 | (1) |
| 2018–2020 | Municipal | 12 | (0) |
| 2020-2021 | Xelajú | 8 | (0) |
| 2021-2022 | Cobán Imperial | 11 | (1) |

International career^{‡}
| 2012–2013 | United States U20 | 2 | (0) |
| 2016– | Guatemala | 3 | (0) |
- * Club domestic league appearances and goals as of 12 January 2021 (UTC) ‡ National team caps and goals as of February 1, 2017

Jefrey Payeras (born October 16, 1993) is an American-born Guatemalan soccer player who plays as a defender.

In August 2016, Payeras made his debut for Guatemala in a friendly 0–0 tie against Panama.

== Honors ==
C.S.D. Municipal

- Clausura: 2017
