= Josh Turnley =

American soccer player

Personal information
- Full name: Joshua Turnley
- Date of birth: December 22, 1993 (age 32)
- Place of birth: Beaver, Pennsylvania, United States
- Height: 1.80 m (5 ft 11 in)
- Positions: Defender; defensive midfielder

College career
Years	Team	Apps	(Gls)
2012–2015	Georgetown Hoyas	67	(0)

Senior career*
Years	Team	Apps	(Gls)
2014	D.C. United U-23	13	(0)
2016–2017	LA Galaxy II	36	(0)
2018	Sacramento Republic	10	(0)
- * Club domestic league appearances and goals as of 17:07, 17 October 2018 (UTC)

Joshua "Josh" Turnley (born December 22, 1993) is a former American soccer player.

== Career ==
=== Youth and college ===
Turnley played four years of college soccer at Georgetown University between 2012 and 2015.

While at college, Turnley also appeared for Premier Development League side D.C. United U-23 in 2015.

Turnley graduated from Beaver Area High School in 2012. He played soccer throughout high school for the Beaver Bobcats

=== Professional ===
On January 19, 2016, Turnley was selected 42nd overall in the 2016 MLS SuperDraft by LA Galaxy.

Turnley signed with LA Galaxy's United Soccer League side LA Galaxy II on March 21, 2016.

On January 9, 2018, Turnley signed with Sacramento Republic FC for the 2018 season. He was released by Sacramento on November 30, 2018.
