= Andre Ulrich Zanga =

Cameroonian footballer

Personal information
- Full name: Andre Ulrich Zanga
- Date of birth: April 4, 1997 (age 29)
- Place of birth: Yaoundé, Cameroon
- Height: 1.86 m (6 ft 1 in)
- Position: Midfielder

Youth career
- Pokam FC

Senior career*
Years	Team	Apps	(Gls)
–2017	Kadji Sports Academy		
2017–2018	→ LA Galaxy II (loan)	45	(0)
2020–2021	Tonnerre Yaoundé		
2021–2022	AR Menoua		
2023	CS Constantine	0	(0)

International career
	Cameroon U-17	5	
	Cameroon U-20	7	
	Cameroon U-23	4	
- * Club domestic league appearances and goals as of 7 December 2023

Andre Ulrich Zanga (born 4 April 1997) is a Cameroonian footballer.

== Career ==
After spending time in the Kadji Sports Academy Zanga signed on loan with LA Galaxy II, a USL affiliate club of LA Galaxy. In August 2023, he joined Algerian club CS Constantine. On 6 December 2023, he left CS Constantine.
