= Alejandro Covarrubias =

American soccer player

Personal information
- Full name: Alejandro Covarrubias
- Date of birth: September 17, 1991 (age 35)
- Place of birth: Cudahy, California, United States
- Height: 1.85 m (6 ft 1 in)
- Position: Midfielder

Youth career
- 2009–2011: LA Galaxy

College career
Years	Team	Apps	(Gls)
2011–2012	Cerritos College Falcons		
2013	Cal State Dominguez Hills Toros	18	(6)

Senior career*
Years	Team	Apps	(Gls)
2014–2016	LA Galaxy II	76	(1)
2017	Oklahoma City Energy	4	(0)
2017	LA Galaxy II	21	(0)
2018	Fresno FC	0	(0)
2018	Des Moines Menace	7	(0)
2018	Tulsa Roughnecks	13	(0)
2019	Detroit City	1	(0)
2019	Des Moines Menace	2	(0)

International career^{‡}
2010	United States U18	1	(0)
- * Club domestic league appearances and goals as of 17:47, 17 October 2018 (UTC) ‡ National team caps and goals as of September 15, 2014

Alejandro Covarrubias (born September 17, 1991) is an American soccer player who plays as a midfielder.

== Youth and college career ==
Covarrubias spent his high school years playing for the LA Galaxy youth academy before attending Cerritos College to play college soccer. A standout his freshman and sophomore years, Covarrubias transferred to California State University, Dominguez Hills to play college soccer for their team. In his first, and only season with the Toros, Covarrubias started every game and registered six goals and five assists in eighteen appearances for the Toros.

== Senior career ==
Upon his junior year of college, Covarrubias opted to forgo his senior year and join LA Galaxy II, the Galaxy's reserve side. Covarrubias signed with United Soccer League side Oklahoma City Energy on December 15, 2016. He returned to Los Angeles on May 18, 2017.

Covarrubias signed with Fresno FC on January 10, 2018, for the 2018 season.

After a spell with USL PDL side Des Moines Menace, Covarrubias signed with USL side Tulsa Roughnecks on July 27, 2018.

== International career ==
Covarrubias was capped once in 2010 for the United States U18 squad.
