= Ryo Fujii =

Hong Kong footballer

Personal information
- Full name: Ryo Fujii
- Date of birth: 7 August 1996 (age 30)
- Place of birth: Hong Kong
- Height: 1.78 m (5 ft 10 in)
- Position: Defensive midfielder

Team information
- Current team: Preah Khan Reach Svay Rieng
- Number: 28

Youth career
- 2010–2014: South High School
- 2011–2012: Chivas USA
- 2013–2014: LA Galaxy

College career
Years	Team	Apps	(Gls)
2014	UC Santa Barbara Gauchos	19	(0)

Senior career*
Years	Team	Apps	(Gls)
2015–2017	LA Galaxy II	58	(4)
2018	Nyköpings BIS	28	(0)
2020	Global	0	(0)
2021–2022	Kaya–Iloilo	10	(1)
2023	PSIS Semarang	15	(0)
2023–	Preah Khan Reach Svay Rieng	52	(4)
- * Club domestic league appearances and goals as of 20 December 2025

Ryo Fujii (Japanese: 藤井 竜, romanized: Fujii Ryū; born 7 August 1996) is a Hong Kong professional footballer who plays as a defensive midfielder for Cambodian Premier League club Preah Khan Reach Svay Rieng.

== Early life and education ==
Fujii was born on 7 August 1996 in Hong Kong to a Japanese father and a Korean mother. At a young age, Fujii and his family relocated to Torrance, California where he was raised. Fujii attended South High School and played for the school's varsity team for all 4 years. He joined and played with Chivas USA's youth side for the 2011–2012 U.S. Soccer Development Academy season before appearing with LA Galaxy's youth side for the 2013–2014 season.

With his background, Fujii was considered a top collegiate soccer prospect. Fujii elected to attend the University of California, Santa Barbara after being recruited by head coach Tim Vom Steeg. While there, he played college soccer as a member of the UC Santa Barbara Gauchos men's soccer team. He appeared in 19 games for the Gauchos and added 2 assists. He was named to the Big West Conference All-Freshman Team following the conclusion of the season.

== Career ==
=== LA Galaxy II ===
In February 2015, Fujii turned professional by signing with LA Galaxy II of the United Soccer League. By turning professional, he forfeited his amateur status and scholarship with UC Santa Barbara. Still, Fujii was the first player to sign for LA Galaxy under a new partnership with California State University that provided additional financial resources for schooling. Jovan Kirovski, the one responsible for Fujii's path, is unaware of any previous similar agreements and that this may be the first of its kind. During his first professional season, he made twelve appearances for LA Galaxy II with 1 assist.

=== Nyköpings BIS ===
On 1 March 2018, Fujii joined Nyköpings BIS in Ettan Fotboll, the Swedish third tier.

=== Global F.C. ===
On 25 February 2020, Fujii reportedly signed a deal with the Philippines Football League club Global but the club was banned by the Philippine Football Federation before the season could start.

=== Kaya F.C.–Iloilo ===
Philippines Football League club Kaya–Iloilo announced on 8 April 2021 that they have signed in Fujii.

=== PSIS Semarang ===
After a one month trial, Ryo Fujii was signed by PSIS Semarang to face the second round of 2022–23 Liga 1. Fujii made his professional debut on 16 January 2023 in a match against RANS Nusantara at the Pakansari Stadium, Bogor.

== Honors ==
Kaya–Iloilo

- Philippines Football League: 2022–23

Preah Khan Reach Svay Rieng

- Cambodian Premier League: 2023–24, 2024–25, 2025–26
- AFC Challenge League runner-up: 2024–25, 2025–26
