= Adrian Vera =

American soccer player

Personal information
- Date of birth: January 13, 1997 (age 29)
- Place of birth: Norwalk, Los Angeles, California, United States
- Height: 1.72 m (5 ft 8 in)
- Position: Midfielder

Youth career
- 2011–2015: LA Galaxy

Senior career*
| Years | Team | Apps | (Gls) |
| 2015–2020 | LA Galaxy II | 111 | (7) |
| 2021 | Rio Grande Valley | 27 | (0) |
| 2022–2023 | Central Valley Fuego | 23 | (0) |
- * Club domestic league appearances and goals as of October 14, 2023

Adrian Vera (born January 13, 1997) is an American professional soccer player.

== Career ==
Vera signed with LA Galaxy II on July 20, 2015.

In March 2021, after six seasons with LA Galaxy II, Vera joined Rio Grande Valley FC ahead of the 2021 season.

On August 3, 2022, Vera joined USL League One side Central Valley Fuego.
