= Hugo Arellano =

American soccer player

Personal information
- Date of birth: March 5, 1998 (age 28)
- Place of birth: La Palma, California, United States
- Height: 1.75 m (5 ft 9 in)
- Position: Defender

Youth career
- 2013–2014: Chivas USA
- 2015–2016: LA Galaxy

Senior career*
Years	Team	Apps	(Gls)
2015–2018	LA Galaxy II	40	(1)
2017–2019	LA Galaxy	4	(0)
2019	→ Orange County SC (loan)	7	(0)

International career^{‡}
2013–2015	United States U17	27	(2)
2016	United States U19	4	(0)
2016	United States U20	5	(0)
- * Club domestic league appearances and goals as of October 25, 2019 ‡ National team caps and goals as of July 19, 2016

Hugo Arellano (born March 5, 1998) is an American soccer player who most recently played for LA Galaxy in Major League Soccer.

== Career ==
Arellano began playing with LA Galaxy II during their 2016 season after a stint with their academy.

Arellano made his professional first team debut for the LA Galaxy on June 17, 2017.

== International career ==
Born in the United States to Mexican parents, Arellano is a youth international for the United States.
