= 2023 LA Galaxy II season =

LA Galaxy II
2023 season
- Head coach: Marcelo Sarvas
- Stadium: Dignity Health Sports Park
- MLS Next Pro: Western Conference: 14th Overall: 26th
- Top goalscorer: Aaron Bibout (14 goals)
Home colours	Away colours

The 2023 LA Galaxy II season was the club's 10th season in existence, and their first season in the MLS Next Pro.

== Squad information ==
As of March 23, 2023

No.	Pos.	Player	Nation
28	DF	USA	Marcus Ferkranus
30	MF	CRC	Gino Vivi
35	GK	SRB	Novak Mićović
38	MF	USA	Axel Picazo
41	GK	USA	Simon Jillson
43	MF	USA	Adam Saldaña
45	MF	MEX	Adrián González
47	DF	USA	Carson Klein
48	MF	MEX	Diego López
50	DF	USA	Riley Dalgado
51	DF	CMR	Ascel Essengue
52	DF	USA	Elijah Amadin
53	MF	MEX	Alex Alcalá
54	MF	MEX	Brandon Téllez
55	MF	USA	Diego Rodriguez
56	MF	MEX	Jonathan Pérez
59	DF	USA	Owen Bizarro
60	GK	USA	Nolan Anderson
61	FW	USA	Brendan Bell
62	FW	USA	Nicholas Rozo
64	DF	USA	Javier Zapien
65	MF	USA	Juan Calderón
66	DF	USA	Matteo Carbone
70	FW	USA	Nicholas Dunbar
71	FW	USA	Justin Knighton
72	MF	ARG	Nicolas Schelotto
73	FW	CMR	Aaron Bibout
74	FW	USA	Sergio Villalpando
76	GK	USA	Aaron Cervantes
79	MF	USA	Paulo Rudisill
80	DF	USA	Luis Medina
82	FW	USA	Julian Placias
83	DF	USA	Allen LeGaspi
84	FW	USA	Rubén Ramos

Signed to first team contract with LA Galaxy.
LA Galaxy Academy player.

== Competitions ==
=== Preseason ===
LA Galaxy II announced the friendlies schedule on February 2, 2023.

February 11, 2023	LA Galaxy II	1–2	Orange County SC	Carson, California
				Stadium: Dignity Health Sports Park

March 4, 2023	LA Galaxy II	1–2	Las Vegas Lights FC	Carson, California
		Report		Stadium: Dignity Health Sports Park

=== Friendlies ===
July 22, 2023	LA Galaxy II	0–4	(Wales) Wrexham	Carson, California
7:30 p.m.		Report	Hayden (yellow card) 27'; Cannon 47'; Lee 55'; Mullin 65'; Forde 68'	Stadium: Dignity Health Sports Park; Attendance: 10,553; Referee: Omeed Azadpour

=== MLS Next Pro ===
==== Western Conference ====
Pos	Div	Team	Pld	W	SOW	SOL	L	GF	GA	GD	Pts
10	PC	Portland Timbers 2	28	11	0	1	16	40	63	−23	34
11	PC	Whitecaps FC 2	28	8	3	4	13	33	46	−13	34
12	PC	Real Monarchs	28	8	2	3	15	27	54	−27	31
13	PC	Los Angeles FC 2	28	6	0	7	15	30	39	−9	25
14	PC	LA Galaxy II	28	5	4	2	17	36	74	−38	25

Source: MLSNP Western Conference
Rules for classification: 1) points; 2) total wins; 3) total goal differential; 4) total goals scored; 5) fewer disciplinary points; 6) away goal differential; 7) away goals scored; 8) home goals differential; 9) home goals scored; 10) coin toss (2 clubs tied) or drawing of lots (≥3 clubs tied)

==== Overall table ====
Pos	Team	Pld	W	SOW	SOL	L	GF	GA	GD	Pts	Awards
23	Toronto FC II	28	6	3	5	14	43	57	−14	29	
24	FC Cincinnati 2	28	7	2	2	17	37	65	−28	27	
25	Los Angeles FC 2	28	6	0	7	15	30	39	−9	25	
26	LA Galaxy II	28	5	4	2	17	36	74	−38	25	U.S. Open Cup First Round
27	Inter Miami CF II	28	5	1	5	17	34	68	−34	22	

Source: MLSNP
Rules for classification: 1) points; 2) total wins; 3) total goal differential; 4) total goals scored; 5) fewer disciplinary points; 6) away goal differential; 7) away goals scored; 8) home goals differential; 9) home goals scored; 10) coin toss (2 clubs tied) or drawing of lots (≥3 clubs tied)

==== Regular season ====
The full schedule was announced on March 14.

All times in Pacific Time Zone.

March 26, 2023 1	San Jose Earthquakes II	3–0	LA Galaxy II	San Jose, California
5:00 p.m.	Carrillo (yellow card) 12'; Bouda 26'; Richmond 31'; Cilley (yellow card) 38'; Walls (yellow card) 78'; Kwende Jr. 83'	Report	Dalgado (yellow card) 48'	Stadium: PayPal Park; Referee: Christopher Calderon

April 2, 2023 2	LA Galaxy II	0–1	North Texas SC	Carson, California
5:00 p.m.	Saldana (yellow card) 33'; Essengue (yellow card) 45+1'	Report	Korça (yellow card) 23'; Essengue 44' (o.g.); Urzua (yellow card) 83'	Stadium: Dignity Health Sports Park; Referee: Alexis Da Silva

April 9, 2023 3	LA Galaxy II	1–2	Minnesota United FC 2	Carson, California
5:00 p.m.	Tellez 6'; González (yellow card) 90+3'	Report	Oluwaseyi 3'; Rodas (yellow card) 11'; Iwe 36' (pen.); Fischer (yellow card) 76'	Stadium: Dignity Health Sports Park; Referee: Adam Zarrin

April 16, 2023 4	Whitecaps FC 2	3–4	LA Galaxy II	Burnaby
5:00 p.m.	Coupland (yellow card) 35'; Amanda 44'; Habibullah 51'; Aguilar 74'	Report	Bibout 2', 56', 88', (yellow card) 54'; Rudisill 59'; Carbone (yellow card) 69'; López (yellow card) 72'	Stadium: Swangard Stadium; Referee: Mario Alayass

April 23, 2023 5	LA Galaxy II	1–1 (5–4 SO)	Austin FC II	Carson, California
5:00 p.m.	Picazo 41'; Klein (yellow card) 43'	Report	Byaruhanga 21'; Walti (yellow card) 29'; Mazzaferro (yellow card) 34'; Louis Jean (yellow card) 83'	Stadium: Dignity Health Sports Park; Referee: Brad Jensen
	Shootout
	Rudisill (penalty scored); Tellez (penalty scored); Pérez (penalty scored); López (penalty scored); Saldana (penalty missed); Amadin (penalty scored)		(penalty scored) Noël; (penalty missed) Byaruhanga; (penalty scored) Touré; (penalty scored) Asensio; (penalty scored) Pineau; (penalty missed) Mazzaferro

April 30, 2023 6	Tacoma Defiance	3–1	LA Galaxy II	Tukwila, Washington
8:00 p.m.	Bowen (yellow card) 7'; Herrera (yellow card) 24'; Uderitz 42' (pen.); Daroma (yellow card) 44'; Ovalle (yellow card) 51'; Rothrock 69'; Thomas (yellow card) 77'; Rodrigues 80'	Report	Ferkranus (yellow card) 25'; González (yellow card) 41'; Bibout 78' (pen.); Essengue (yellow card) 82' (yellow-red card) 90+3'	Stadium: Starfire Stadium; Referee: Corbyn May

May 7, 2023 7	LA Galaxy II	0–5	Colorado Rapids 2	Carson, California
5:00 p.m.	Bibout (yellow card) 53'; Saldana (red card) 57'; Tellez (red card) 80'; González (yellow card) 82'	Report	Vargas 17'; Malone (yellow card) 32'; Hanya 42', 58'; Garcia 51', (yellow card) 62'; Cabral 60'	Stadium: Dignity Health Sports Park; Referee: Chris Ruska

May 14, 2023 8	Sporting Kansas City II	2–1	LA Galaxy II	Lawrence, Kansas
3:00 p.m.	Flores 72'; Mauriz (yellow card) 83'; Vidal 90+2'	Report	Ramos 2'; Essengue (yellow card) 34'; González (yellow card) 61'	Stadium: Rock Chalk Park; Referee: Matthew Corrigan

May 21, 2023 9	LA Galaxy II	2–0	Portland Timbers 2	Carson, California
5:00 p.m.	Ramos 11'; Alcalá 20'; Klein (yellow card) 51'	Report		Stadium: Dignity Health Sports Park; Referee: Alex Beeley

May 24, 2023 10	Minnesota United FC 2	3–2	LA Galaxy II	Blaine, Minnesota
5:00 p.m.	Fischer 18'; Iwe 68'; Mosquera 87'	Report	Calderón 10'; Bibout (yellow card) 16', (goal) 77'	Stadium: National Sports Center; Referee: Greg Dopka

May 28, 2023 11	LA Galaxy II	2–2 (4–2 SO)	Whitecaps FC 2	Carson, California
7:30 p.m.	Bibout 27', 51'; Saldana (yellow card) 37'; González (yellow card) 71'; Picazo (yellow card) 84'	Report	Fry (yellow card) 14'; Ndakala 34'; Johnston 53'	Stadium: Dignity Health Sports Park; Referee: Matthew Thompson
	Shootout
	González (penalty scored); Tellez (penalty scored); Calderón (penalty scored); Bibout (penalty scored)		Aguilar (penalty scored); Habibullah (penalty missed); Ngando (penalty scored); Fry (penalty missed)

June 4, 2023 12	North Texas SC	2–0	LA Galaxy II	Arlington, Texas
5:30 p.m.	Sainte (yellow card) 29'; Henri (yellow card) 37'; Ramirez 50', 56'; Araneda (yellow card) 85'; Hernandez (yellow card) 89'	Report	Tellez (yellow card) 80'; Essengue (yellow card) 86'	Stadium: Choctaw Stadium; Attendance: 787; Referee: Abdou Ndiaye

June 9, 2023 13	Real Monarchs	3–3 (5–4 SO)	LA Galaxy II	Herriman, Utah
8:00 p.m.	Paul 7' (pen.), 90+2'; Rivera (yellow card) 17'; Sinclair (yellow card) 40', (goal) 49'; Jacquesson (yellow card) 43'; Nigro (yellow card) 62'	Report	Carbone (yellow card) 7'; Bibout 14'; Alcalá 68'; Amadin (yellow card) 76', (goal) 74'	Stadium: Zions Bank Stadium; Referee: Elvis Osmanovic
	Shootout
	Nyeman (penalty missed); Nigro (penalty missed); Jacquesson (penalty scored); Iskenderian (penalty scored); Paul (penalty scored); Dillon (penalty scored); Williams (penalty scored)		González (penalty scored); Calderón (penalty scored); Alcalá (penalty missed); Bibout (penalty scored); Essengue (penalty missed); Saldana (penalty scored); Amadin (penalty missed)

June 25, 2023 14	Colorado Rapids 2	5–1	LA Galaxy II	Denver
5:30 p.m.	Harris 19', 24'; Larraz 71'; Vargas 83'; Aguirre 88'	Report	Calderón 11'; Essengue (yellow card) 43' (yellow-red card) 77'	Stadium: CIBER Field at the University of Denver Soccer Stadium; Referee: Jalen Gray

June 29, 2023 15	San Jose Earthquakes II	2–2 (9–8 SO)	LA Galaxy II	San Jose, California
7:00 p.m.	Serrano 10'; Richmond (yellow card) 25'; Hațegan (yellow card) 36', (goal) 37'; Cilley (yellow card) 73'; Blancas (yellow card) 86'; Edwards (yellow card) 90'	Report	Bibout 23'; González (yellow card) 31'; Picazo 50'; Knighton (yellow card) 82'	Stadium: PayPal Park; Referee: Sergii Demianchuk
	Shootout
	Blancas (penalty scored); Castro (penalty scored); Serrano (penalty scored); Walls (penalty scored); Cilley (penalty scored); Tingey (penalty scored); Edwards (penalty scored); Mota Morfin (penalty scored); Ayon (penalty missed); Mendoza (penalty scored)		González (penalty scored); Schelotto (penalty scored); López (penalty scored); Bibout (penalty scored); Alcalá (penalty scored); Medina (penalty scored); Amadin (penalty scored); Knighton (penalty scored); Garcia (penalty missed); Ferkranus (penalty missed)

July 9, 2023 16	LA Galaxy II	1–0	St. Louis City 2	Carson, California
5:00 p.m.	Klein 71'	Report	Volmar (yellow card) 44'; McGuire (yellow card) 62'; Hackworth (yellow card) 81'	Stadium: Dignity Health Sports Park; Referee: Matthew Corrigan

July 12, 2023 17	LA Galaxy II	4–3	Los Angeles FC 2	Carson, California
7:00 p.m.	Dalgado (yellow card) 1'; Alcalá 28'; González 34' (pen.), (yellow card) 72'; Vivi 53'; Essengue (yellow card) 77'; Bibout 79'	Report	Diaz (yellow card) 58'; Wibowo 69'; Romero (yellow card) 70'; Jaime (yellow card) 75'; Vazquez 82' (pen.); Matheus Maia 84', (yellow card) 89'	Stadium: Dignity Health Sports Park; Referee: Benjamin Meyer

July 16, 2023 18	LA Galaxy II	1–1 (4–3 SO)	Tacoma Defiance	Carson, California
5:00 p.m.	Pérez 11'; Dalgado (yellow card) 37'; Vivi (yellow card) 43'; Saldana (yellow card) 66'; Bibout (yellow card) 75'	Report	Ovalle (yellow card) 35'; Teves 55'	Stadium: Dignity Health Sports Park; Referee: Laura Rodriguez
	Shootout
	González (penalty scored); Schelotto (penalty scored); Picazo (penalty scored); López (penalty scored)		Uderitz (penalty missed); Teves (penalty scored); Daroma (penalty scored); Miglietti (penalty scored); Karalkovas (penalty missed)

July 30, 2023 19	Austin FC II	4–0	LA Galaxy II	Austin, Texas
4:00 p.m.	Burton 12'; Louis Jean (yellow card) 15'; Vela (yellow card) 40'; Ramírez 61' (pen.); Torres 68'; De Anda (yellow card) 90+1'; Arellano 90+5'	Report	Schelotto (yellow card) 44' (yellow-red card) 71'; López (yellow card) 56'; González (yellow card) 60'	Stadium: Parmer Field; Referee: Kyle Armstrong

August 6, 2023 20	LA Galaxy II	1–4	San Jose Earthquakes II	Carson, California
5:00 p.m.	Picazo 6'; Ferkranus (yellow card) 24'; Tellez (yellow card) 85'	Report	Medina 14'; Bouda 30', 66'; Blancas 87'	Stadium: Dignity Health Sports Park; Referee: Alex Beehler

August 9, 2023 21	Portland Timbers 2	6–1	LA Galaxy II	Portland, Oregon
7:30 p.m.	Monzón 7' (pen.); Gutierrez 29', 55', 66', (yellow card) 57'; Pope (yellow card) 45+1'; Rasmussen (yellow card) 64'; Caliskan 65'; Bravo 81'	Report	Dalgado (yellow card) 42'; Klein (yellow card) 75'; Picazo 90'	Stadium: Providence Park; Referee: Corbyn May

August 12, 2023 22	Los Angeles FC 2	6–0	LA Galaxy II	Fullerton, California
1:00 p.m.	Flores 8', 26'; Batioja 14'; Ordaz 16'; Dueñas 52'; Torres 70'	Report	LeGaspi (yellow card) 7'	Stadium: Titan Stadium; Referee: Olvin Oliva

August 19, 2023 23	LA Galaxy II	0–0 (10–9 SO)	Real Monarchs	Carson, California
7:30 p.m.	Vivi (yellow card) 90+3'	Report	Farnsworth (yellow card) 27'; Pierre (yellow card) 77'	Stadium: Dignity Health Sports Park; Referee: Osvaldo Delgado-Landeros
	Shootout
	González (penalty scored); Vivi (penalty missed); Pérez (penalty missed); Saldana (penalty scored); Bibout (penalty scored); Ramos (penalty scored); Dalgado (penalty scored); LeGaspi (penalty scored); Essengue (penalty scored); Ferkranus (penalty scored); Jillson (penalty scored); González (penalty scored)		(penalty missed) Paul; (penalty missed) Pierre; (penalty scored) Storlie; (penalty scored) Alba; (penalty scored) Kei; (penalty scored) Dillon; (penalty scored) Pierre; (penalty scored) Mondi; (penalty scored) Nyeman; (penalty scored) Garcia; (penalty scored) Delgado; (penalty missed) Paul

August 27, 2023 24	Houston Dynamo 2	0–4	LA Galaxy II	Houston
4:00 p.m.	Murana (yellow card) 17'; Gonzalez (yellow card) 72'	Report	Bibout 20', 69'; Dalgado (yellow card) 41'; Pérez 53'; Placias 90+3'	Stadium: SaberCats Stadium; Referee: Servando Berna Rico

September 3, 2023 25	LA Galaxy II	1–5	Sporting Kansas City II	Carson, California
7:00 p.m.	Calderón (yellow card) 50'; González 68' (pen.)	Report	Flores (yellow card) 5'; Coan 13'; Duke 31'; Bryant 51', 56'; Vidal 65'	Stadium: Dignity Health Sports Park; Referee: Mark Verso

September 9, 2023 26	LA Galaxy II	1–2	Los Angeles FC 2	Carson, California
7:30 p.m.	Bibout 23', (yellow card) 70'; Klein (yellow card) 44'; Ferkranus (yellow card) 47'; Essengue (yellow card) 51'; Dalgado (yellow card) 85'; Picazo (yellow card) 90+5'	Report	Jaime 17', (yellow card) 90+2'; Batioja 52' (pen.); Matheus Maia (yellow card) 90+4'	Stadium: Dignity Health Sports Park; Referee: Brandon Stevis

September 17, 2023 27	St. Louis City 2	4–1	LA Galaxy II	St. Louis
3:00 p.m.	Kuzain 8'; Glover 28'; Jillson 33' (o.g.); Klein 48'	Report	Picazo (yellow card) 45+4'; González (yellow card) 72'; Bibout 75'	Stadium: Citypark; Attendance: 9,626; Referee: Alejo Calume

September 24, 2023 28	LA Galaxy II	1–2	Houston Dynamo 2	Carson, California
2:00 p.m.	Vivi 59'; Picazo (yellow card) 63'; Ferkranus (yellow card) 70'	Report	Ndoye 19'; Maples 71'	Stadium: Dignity Health Sports Park; Referee: Corbyn May

== See also ==
- 2023 in American soccer
- 2023 LA Galaxy season
