= 2022 LA Galaxy II season =

LA Galaxy II
2022 season
- Head coach: Yoann Damet (Until August 26); Marcelo Sarvas (August 26–)
- Stadium: Dignity Health Sports Park
- USL Championship: Western Conference: 11th
- Top goalscorer: Preston Judd (13 goals)
- Biggest win: SD 0–5 LA (July 9)
- Biggest defeat: MEM 5–0 LA (May 18)
Home colors	Away colors

The 2022 LA Galaxy II season was the club's 9th season of existence, and their 9th and last season in the USL Championship. From 2023 onwards the team will compete in the MLS Next Pro.

== Squad information ==
As of August 14, 2022

No.	Pos.	Player	Nation
12	GK	USA	Eric López
21	GK	MEX	Richard Sánchez
24	DF	USA	Jalen Neal
25	FW	USA	Cameron Dunbar
27	MF	PAN	Carlos Harvey
28	DF	USA	Marcus Ferkranus
30	DF	USA	Josh Drack
31	FW	USA	Preston Judd
32	MF	USA	Callum Johnson
34	MF	USA	Taylor Davila
38	MF	USA	Axel Picazo
39	DF	USA	Chandler Vaughn
40	MF	SRB	Miloš Nikolić
42	GK	USA	Alan Solorio
43	MF	USA	Adam Saldana
45	MF	MEX	Adrián González
46	MF	JPN	Tsubasa Endoh
47	DF	USA	Owen Lambe
48	MF	GAM	Hamza Barry
49	MF	FRA	Rémi Cabral
51	MF	CMR	Ascel Essengue
52	DF	CAN	Dante Campbell
56	MF	MEX	Jonathan Perez
57	MF	JAM	Duhaney Williams
62	MF	MEX	Álex Alcalá
66	MF	USA	Victor Valdez
73	FW	BLZ	Michael Salazar
74	DF	Isle of Man	Liam Doyle

Signed to first team contract with LA Galaxy.
LA Galaxy Academy player.

=== Transfers ===
==== Transfers in ====
Pos.	Player	Transferred from	Fee/notes	Date	Source
DF	(Canada) Dante Campbell	(Canada) Toronto FC II	Sign.	March 3, 2022	
DF	(Isle of Man) Liam Doyle	(United States) San Antonio FC	Sign.	March 3, 2022	
MF	(United States) Callum Johnson	(United States) Clemson University	Selected in the 2022 MLS SuperDraft by the LA Galaxy.	March 3, 2022	
GK	(United States) Eric Lopez		Released by the LA Galaxy following the 2021 season.	March 3, 2022	
FW	(Belize) Michael Salazar	(United States) Memphis 901	Sign.	March 3, 2022	
DF	(United States) Chandler Vaughn	(United States) Saint Louis University	Selected in the 2022 MLS SuperDraft by the LA Galaxy.	March 3, 2022	
MF	(Serbia) Miloš Nikolić	(Serbia) OFK Žarkovo	Sign.	August 14, 2022	
MF	(Japan) Tsubasa Endoh	(Australia) Melbourne City FC	Sign.	August 2022	

== Competitions ==
=== USL Championship ===
==== Standings ====
===== Western Conference =====
Pos	Team	Pld	W	L	T	GF	GA	GD	Pts
9	Las Vegas Lights FC	34	12	13	9	40	50	−10	45
10	Phoenix Rising FC	34	12	16	6	50	58	−8	42
11	LA Galaxy II	34	11	16	7	53	63	−10	40
12	Monterey Bay FC	34	12	18	4	42	59	−17	40
13	Orange County SC	34	7	14	13	49	59	−10	34

Source: USL Championship Standings
Rules for classification: 1) head-to-head points; 2) head-to-head goal differential; 3) points-per game within conference; 4) total wins; 5) total goal differential; 6) total goals scored; 7) points earned against top four Conference finishers; 8) disciplinary points; 9) coin toss or drawing of lots

==== Regular season ====
The full schedule was released on January 12, 2022. And the kickoff times were announced on January 27, 2022.

All times in Pacific Time Zone.

March 12 1	San Diego Loyal SC	2–1	LA Galaxy II	San Diego, California
7:00 PM	Vassell (yellow card) 26'; Guido (yellow card) 71'; Amang 78'; Neal 90+7' (o.g.)	Report	Doyle (yellow card) 26'; Salazar (yellow card) 58'; Aguirre (yellow card) 69'; Harvey (yellow card) 72'; Judd (yellow card) 78', (goal) 84'; Cabral (red card) 82'	Stadium: Torero Stadium; Attendance: 5,014; Referee: Elijio Arreguin

March 19 2	LA Galaxy II	1–2	San Antonio FC	Carson, California
4:00 PM	González (yellow card) 13' (yellow-red card) 52'; Harvey 30'	Report	Loera 10'; Manley (yellow card) 35'; Garcia (yellow card) 39'; Taintor (yellow card) 50', (goal) 53'; Collier (red card) 55'	Stadium: Dignity Health Sports Park; Attendance: 500; Referee: DeShun Beard

March 23 3	LA Galaxy II	1–0	Rio Grande Valley FC Toros	Carson, California
7:30 PM	Salazar (yellow card) 25'; Davila 45', (yellow card) 63'; Harvey (yellow card) 59'; Judd (yellow card) 83'; Aguirre (yellow card) 89'	Report	Malešević (yellow card) 68'; López (yellow card) 90+3'	Stadium: Dignity Health Sports Park; Referee: Ricardo Fierro

April 2 4	Indy Eleven	1–1	LA Galaxy II	Indianapolis, Indiana
4:00 PM	Fjeldberg (yellow card) 12'; Aguilera 61'; Ingram (yellow card) 74'	Report	Drack (yellow card) 11'; Salazar 35'; Judd (yellow card) 39'	Stadium: Michael A. Carroll Stadium; Attendance: 8,037; Referee: Nabil Bensalah

April 9 5	Phoenix Rising FC	3–1	LA Galaxy II	Chandler, Arizona
7:30 PM	Seijas 31', 42' (yellow card) 56'; Calistri (yellow card) 74'; Epps 90'	Report	Davila (yellow card) 45+2'; Salazar (yellow card) 65'; Cabral 68'; Barry (yellow card) 76'	Stadium: Phoenix Rising Soccer Complex at Wild Horse Pass; Attendance: 8,019; Referee: Luis Guardia

April 16 6	LA Galaxy II	3–1	Monterey Bay FC	Carson, California
7:30 PM	Salazar 40'; Doyle (yellow card) 55'; Williams 57'; Cobian (yellow card) 84'; Judd 86'	Report	Roberts (yellow card) 54' (yellow-red card) 81'; Conneh 68'; Fehr (yellow card) 84'; Volesky (yellow card) 90+1'	Stadium: Dignity Health Sports Park; Referee: Benjamin Meyer

April 23 7	Las Vegas Lights FC	1–1	LA Galaxy II	Las Vegas, Nevada
7:00 PM	Crisostomo 32'; Traore (yellow card) 53'	Report	Campbell 74'	Stadium: Cashman Field; Attendance: 8,052; Referee: Calin Radosav

May 1 8	LA Galaxy II	3–0	Phoenix Rising FC	Carson, California
5:00 PM	Cabral 2', (yellow card) 63'; Dunbar 13'; Perez 43'; Barry (yellow card) 57'; Doyle (yellow card) 74'; Williams (yellow card) 88'	Report	Quinn (yellow card) 19'; Flood (yellow card) 28'; King (red card) 36'	Stadium: Dignity Health Sports Park; Referee: Mark Allatin

May 7 9	El Paso Locomotive FC	4–0	LA Galaxy II	El Paso, Texas
6:30 PM	Calvillo 16', (yellow card) 90+1'; Ryan (yellow card) 19'; Doyle 32' (o.g.); Luna 39'; Bahner (yellow card) 60'; Solignac 63'	Report	Williams (yellow card) 10'; Judd (yellow card) 48'; Doyle (yellow card) 77'	Stadium: Southwest University Park; Attendance: 6,378; Referee: Matthew Thompson

May 13 10	LA Galaxy II	4–3	Louisville City FC	Carson, California
7:30 PM	Dunbar 19', 60'; Doyle (yellow card) 50'; Davila 63' (pen.); Judd (yellow card) 72'; Salazar 76'; Neal (yellow card) 90+2'	Report	Serrano 2'; DelPiccolo (yellow card) 9'; McCabe (yellow card) 17', (goal) 51'; Pino (yellow card) 62'; Harris 78'; Wynder (yellow card) 84'	Stadium: Dignity Health Sports Park; Referee: Brandon Stevis

May 18 11	Memphis 901 FC	5–0	LA Galaxy II	Memphis, Tennessee
5:00 PM	Kissiedou 14', (yellow card) 32'; Molloy 19'; Kelly 45'; Carroll (yellow card) 52'; Goodrum 58'; Egbo 83'	Report	Cabral (yellow card) 39'; Barry (yellow card) 56'; Lambe (yellow card) 70'; Campbell (yellow card) 85'; Harvey (red card) 90'	Stadium: AutoZone Park; Referee: Jervis Atagana

May 21 12	Oakland Roots SC	1–0	LA Galaxy II	Oakland, California
7:00 PM	Karlsson 37' (pen.); Hernández (yellow card) 63'; Díaz (red card) 69'; Rito (yellow card) 90+5'	Report	Salazar (yellow card) 28'; Judd (yellow card) 32'; Cobian (yellow card) 35'; Davila (yellow card) 61'; Doyle (yellow card) 90+5'	Stadium: Laney College Football Stadium; Attendance: 4,421; Referee: John Griggs

May 28 13	LA Galaxy II	2–2	San Diego Loyal SC	Carson, California
7:30 PM	Judd (yellow card) 22', (goal) 90+3'; Cabral (yellow card) 29'; Barry (yellow card) 44'; Davila 90+8' (pen.)	Report	Adams 16'; Vassell 30'; Martin (yellow card) 62'; Stoneman (yellow card) 90+6'	Stadium: Dignity Health Sports Park; Referee: Matthew Conger

June 4 14	Rio Grande Valley FC Toros	0–1	LA Galaxy II	Edinburg, Texas
5:30 PM	Deric (yellow card) 5'; Ricketts (yellow card) 28'; Vázquez (yellow card) 45+1'; Torres (red card) 90+6'	Report	Judd (yellow card) 21', (goal) 48'; Dunbar (yellow card) 31'; Cabral (yellow card) 44'; Lopez (yellow card) 63'; Campbell (yellow card) 90+5'	Stadium: H-E-B Park; Referee: Calin Radosav

June 11 15	LA Galaxy II	1–3	Colorado Springs Switchbacks FC	Carson, California
7:30 PM	Cobian (yellow card) 6'; González (yellow card) 12'; Cabral 14'; Aguirre (yellow card) 55'	Report	Zandi (yellow card) 16'; Barry 37'; Amoh 58'; Lindley 67'; Erdmann (yellow card) 72'	Stadium: Dignity Health Sports Park; Referee: Matthew Corrigan

June 15 16	LA Galaxy II	3–2	Monterey Bay FC	Carson, California
7:30 PM	Judd 6', 11', 53'; Drack (yellow card) 42'; Cabral (yellow card) 48'; Barry (yellow card) 67'; Lopez (yellow card) 90+6'	Report	Doner 51'; Rebollar 62'; Fehr (yellow card) 82'; Maldonado (yellow card) 90+2'	Stadium: Dignity Health Sports Park; Attendance: 150; Referee: Adam Kilpatrick

June 18 17	Sacramento Republic FC	2–0	LA Galaxy II	Sacramento, California
8:00 PM	Archimède 63' (pen.); Jauregui 69'; Donovan (yellow card) 73'; Ross (yellow card) 83'	Report	Sánchez (yellow card) 62'; Judd (yellow card) 73'	Stadium: Heart Health Park; Attendance: 10,691; Referee: Mark Allatin

June 25 18	Miami FC	1–3	LA Galaxy II	University Park, Florida
4:00 PM	Craig (yellow card) 5'; Murphy 17'; Segbers (yellow card) 44'; Chapman-Page (yellow card) 84'	Report	Drack 6'; Salazar 9'; Cabral (yellow card) 23'; Harvey (yellow card) 53'; Judd 70'; Picazo (yellow card) 76'; Doyle (yellow card) 90+4'	Stadium: Riccardo Silva Stadium; Referee: Eric Tattersall

July 1 19	LA Galaxy II	3–1	Oakland Roots SC	Carson, California
7:30 PM	Davila (yellow card) 44'; Cabral 51'; Dunbar 56'; Doyle (yellow card) 61'; Judd 89'	Report	Dennis (yellow card) 40' (yellow-red card) 45+5'; Nane (yellow card) 45+3'; Rito (yellow card) 64'; Azócar 88'; Diaz (yellow card) 90+3'	Stadium: Dignity Health Sports Park; Referee: Jervis Atagana

July 9 20	San Diego Loyal SC	0–5	LA Galaxy II	San Diego, California
7:00 PM	K. Adams (red card) 11'; Moshobane (yellow card) 33'; Moon (yellow card) 60'; C. Adams (yellow card) 80'	Report	Dunbar 13' (pen.), 31'; Judd 22', 59', (yellow card) 88'; Neal (yellow card) 41' (yellow-red card) 85'; Boxall 81' (o.g.); Sánchez (yellow card) 87'	Stadium: Torero Stadium; Attendance: 5,425; Referee: Dejan Susak

July 15 21	Colorado Springs Switchbacks FC	4–2	LA Galaxy II	Colorado Springs, Colorado
6:00 PM	Ngalina 20'; Barry 27'; Amoh 58', 90+7'; Rayyan (yellow card) 63'; Herrera (yellow card) 74'	Report	Barry (yellow card) 40'; Dunbar 45+3' (pen.), (yellow card) 69'; Doyle (yellow card) 52'; Campbell (yellow card) 74'; Harvey (yellow card) 90+2'; Johnson 90+3'	Stadium: Weidner Field; Attendance: 8,023; Referee: Matthew Thompson

July 23 22	LA Galaxy II	2–5	Orange County SC	Carson, California
7:30 PM	Judd 3'; González (yellow card) 13'; Perez 85'	Report	Torres 32', 36'; Rocha (yellow card) 37'; Partida (yellow card) 41'; Hoffmann (yellow card) 44'; Iloski 46', 72'; Skendi 48'; Okoli 79'	Stadium: Dignity Health Sports Park; Referee: Calin Radosav

July 30 23	San Antonio FC	1–1	LA Galaxy II	San Antonio, Texas
6:00 PM	Taintor (yellow card) 37'; Patiño (red card) 62'; Gomez (yellow card) 64', (goal) 90+5'; PC (yellow card) 78'; Dhillon (yellow card) 88'	Report	Campbell (yellow card) 18'; Harvey (yellow card) 61'; Saldana (yellow card) 62'; Drack 87'; Judd (yellow card) 90+4'	Stadium: Toyota Field; Attendance: 6,281; Referee: Jeremy Scheer

August 6 24	Loudoun United FC	2–0	LA Galaxy II	Leesburg, Virginia
4:30 PM	Greene (yellow card) 32'; Zanne (yellow card) 59'; Fletcher 63', 85'; Zamudio (yellow card) 80'	Report		Stadium: Segra Field; Attendance: 2,076; Referee: Alex Beehler

August 14 25	LA Galaxy II	2–2	New Mexico United	Carson, California
5:00 PM	Dunbar 62', (yellow card) 90+4'; Saldana (yellow card) 66'; Perez 69'; Picazo (yellow card) 85'	Report	Suggs (yellow card) 13'; Williams 24'; Lambe 42' (o.g.); Swartz (yellow card) 45+1'; Hamilton (yellow card) 45+2'; Nava (yellow card) 65'	Stadium: Dignity Health Sports Park; Referee: Kevin Broadley

August 20 26	LA Galaxy II	1–1	Charleston Battery	Carson, California
7:30 PM	Neal (yellow card) 13'; Drack 83'; Davila (yellow card) 90'	Report	Hogan 35'; Sheldon (yellow card) 63'; Flanagan (yellow card) 81'; Holcomb (yellow card) 87'; Paterson (yellow card) 90+2'	Stadium: Dignity Health Sports Park; Referee: Brandon Stevis

August 27 27	Monterey Bay FC	0–2	LA Galaxy II	Seaside, California
7:00 PM		Report	Harvey (yellow card) 69'; Endoh 74', 90+1'; Cabral (yellow card) 82'	Stadium: Cardinale Stadium; Attendance: 5,077; Referee: Corbyn May

September 5 28	LA Galaxy II	1–3	Hartford Athletic	Carson, California
7:30 PM	Neal (red card) 27'; Cabral (yellow card) 36'; Dunbar 54'; Judd (yellow card) 55'; González (yellow card) 63'	Report	Johnson (yellow card) 20'; Martínez 29' (pen.); Brewitt (yellow card) 32'; Prpa (yellow card) 62'; Jadama (yellow card) 77'; Lewis 90'; Curry 90+3'	Stadium: Dignity Health Sports Park; Referee: Greg Dopka

September 10 29	Orange County SC	1–0	LA Galaxy II	Irvine, California
7:00 PM	Scott (yellow card) 16'; Powers (yellow card) 24'; Skendi (yellow card) 26'; Hoffmann (yellow card) 41'; Iloski 68', (yellow card) 71'	Report	Drack (yellow card) 39'; Judd (yellow card) 51' (yellow-red card) 74'; Harvey (red card) 75'; González (yellow card) 78'; Essengue (yellow card) 89'	Stadium: Championship Soccer Stadium; Referee: Benjamin Meyer

September 18 30	LA Galaxy II	2–3	El Paso Locomotive FC	Carson, California
5:00 PM	Dunbar 58' (pen.); Cabral 70'	Report	Mares 5', (yellow card) 89'; Solignac 21'; Calvillo 60', (yellow card) 79'; Zacarías (yellow card) 63'; Gómez (yellow card) 72'; Egiluz (yellow card) 84'	Stadium: Dignity Health Sports Park; Referee: Malik Badawi

October 2 32	LA Galaxy II	2–0	Sacramento Republic FC	Carson, California
5:00 PM	Judd 7'; Saldana (yellow card) 20'; Salazar (red card) 37'; Lambe (yellow card) 41'; Bauer 61' (o.g.)	Report	Foster (yellow card) 73'; Lacroix (yellow card) 82'; Martínez (yellow card) 87'; Bauer (yellow card) 90+2'	Stadium: Dignity Health Sports Park; Referee: Brad Jensen

October 8 33	LA Galaxy II	1–3	Atlanta United 2	Carson, California
7:30 PM	González (yellow card) 4'; Dunbar 8', (yellow card) 90+4'	Report	Fortune (yellow card) 25'; Trager 75', 87'; Villal 90+7'	Stadium: Dignity Health Sports Park; Referee: Adam Kilpatrick

October 12 31	New Mexico United	3–2	LA Galaxy II	Albuquerque, New Mexico
6:00 PM	Portillo 13' (pen.); Frater (yellow card) 21'; Seymore (yellow card) 44'; Swartz 49', 54'	Report	Ryden 6' (o.g.); Salazar 31', (yellow card) 88'; Saldana (yellow card) 65'; Doyle (yellow card) 90+3'	Stadium: Isotopes Park; Attendance: 10,426; Referee: Ricardo Fierro
Note: Date changed from September 24. On October 5 the match was abandoned due to waterlogged pitch. The match was rescheduled to October 12.

October 15 34	LA Galaxy II	1–1	Las Vegas Lights FC	Carson, California
7:30 PM	Lambe (yellow card) 12'; Dunbar 15'; Tellez (yellow card) 22'; Saldana (yellow card) 54'	Report	Trejo 33'	Stadium: Dignity Health Sports Park; Referee: Greg Dopka

== See also ==
- 2022 in American soccer
- 2022 LA Galaxy season
