= 2021 LA Galaxy II season =

LA Galaxy II
2021 season
- Head coach: Junior Gonzalez
- Stadium: Dignity Health Sports Park
- USL Championship: Pacific Division: 6th
- Top goalscorer: Preston Judd (17 goals)
- Biggest win: LA 5–0 LV (5/5); LA 5–0 ELP (10/17)
- Biggest defeat: PHX 5–0 LA (7/17)
Home colors	Away colors

The 2021 LA Galaxy II season was the club's 8th season of existence, and their 8th season in the USL Championship, the second tier of the United States Soccer Pyramid.

== Squad information ==
As of April 30, 2021

No.	Pos.	Player	Nation
12	GK	USA	Eric López
18	GK	USA	Justin Vom Steeg
25	FW	USA	Cameron Dunbar
28	FW	NED	Kai Koreniuk
30	DF	USA	Josh Drack
31	FW	USA	Preston Judd
34	MF	USA	Taylor Davila
35	DF	USA	Jesús Vázquez
36	MF	USA	Jorge Hernandez
37	MF	USA	Daniel Aguirre
38	MF	USA	Axel Picazo
42	GK	USA	Alan Solorio
45	MF	MEX	Adrián González
46	DF	GHA	Isaac Bawa
47	DF	USA	Owen Lambe
49	MF	FRA	Rémi Cabral
50	DF	USA	Adrian Aguilar
56	FW	USA	Jonathan Perez
58	DF	USA	Mauricio Cuevas
59	FW	USA	Felix Barajas
61	MF	MEX	Miguel Ávalos
62	MF	MEX	Alex Alcala
63	FW	USA	Sebastian Nava
66	MF	USA	Victor Valdez
74	DF	USA	Marcus Ferkranus

Signed to first team contract with LA Galaxy.
LA Galaxy Academy player.

=== Transfers ===
==== Transfers in ====
Pos.	Player	Transferred from	Fee/notes	Date	Source
MF	(United States) Taylor Davila	(United States) California Golden Bears	Sign. Played for the LA Galaxy Academy in 2018.	February 11, 2021	
MF	(Mexico) Alex Alcala	(United States) LA Galaxy Academy	Sign.	February 16, 2021	
MF	(United States) Victor Valdez	(United States) LA Galaxy Academy	Sign.	March 3, 2021	
MF	(United States) Axel Picazo	(United States) Philadelphia Union II	Sign.	March 4, 2021	
MF	(Mexico) Miguel Ávalos	(Mexico) Pachuca Academy	Sign.	March 25, 2021	
MF	(United States) Adrian Gonzalez	(United States) LA Galaxy Academy	Sign.	April 1, 2021	
MF	(United States) Daniel Aguirre	(United States) UC Riverside Highlanders	Sign.	April 7, 2021	
FW	(United States) Preston Judd	(United States) Denver Pioneers	Sign. Judd was selected by the LA Galaxy in the second round of the 2021 MLS SuperDraft.	April 7, 2021	
DF	(United States) Josh Drack	(United States) Denver Pioneers	Sign. Drack was selected by the LA Galaxy in the first round of the 2021 MLS SuperDraft.	April 26, 2021	
MF	(France) Rémi Cabral	(France) Valenciennes	Sign.	April 27, 2021	
DF	(United States) Owen Lambe	(United States) Cal State Fullerton Titans	Sign.	April 27, 2021	

==== Transfers out ====
Pos.	Player	Transferred to	Fee/notes	Date	Source
FW	(Sierra Leone) Augustine Williams	(United States) LA Galaxy	Sign.	April 30, 2021	

== Competitions ==
=== Friendlies ===
March 19, 2021 Preseason	LA Galaxy II	v	Los Angeles Force	Carson, California
1:00 p.m. PDT		Report		Stadium: Dignity Health Sports Park
Note: Result not published.

March 26, 2021 Preseason	California United Strikers FC	3–1	LA Galaxy II	Irvine, California
10:00 PM PDT		Report		Stadium: Orange County Great Park

March 31, 2021 Preseason	FC Tucson	2–1	LA Galaxy II	Tucson, Arizona
3:00 PM MST	Adams; Fox	Report		Stadium: Kino Sports Complex

April 7, 2021 Preseason	LA Galaxy II	v	Seattle Sounders FC	TBD
TBD				Stadium: TBD

April 21, 2021 Preseason	Orange County SC	v	LA Galaxy II	Irvine, California
TBD				Stadium: Championship Soccer Stadium

=== USL Championship ===
==== Standings ====
===== Western Conference =====
Pos	Div	Team	Pld	W	D	L	GF	GA	GD	Pts	Qualification
9	MT	Austin Bold FC	32	10	12	10	32	42	−10	42	
10	PC	Oakland Roots SC	32	11	8	13	36	43	−7	41	Playoffs
11	PC	LA Galaxy II	32	11	6	15	55	57	−2	39	
12	PC	Tacoma Defiance	32	10	9	13	37	41	−4	39	
13	PC	Sacramento Republic FC	32	8	12	12	36	42	−6	36	

Source: USL Championship
Rules for classification: 1) points; 2) head-to-head points; 3) head-to-head goal differential; 4) total points earned against in-division opponents; 5) total regular season wins against in-division opponents; 6) total goal differential against in-division opponents; 7) total goals scored against in-division opponents; 8) disciplinary points; 9) coin toss or drawing of lots.

===== Pacific Division =====
Pos	Team	Pld	W	L	T	GF	GA	GD	Pts	Qualification
4	Oakland Roots SC	32	11	13	8	36	43	−7	41	Advance to USL Championship Playoffs
5	Tacoma Defiance	32	10	13	9	37	41	−4	39 (Note: Head-to-head points: Tacoma Defiance 8, LA Galaxy II 2.)	
6	LA Galaxy II	32	11	15	6	55	57	−2	39	
7	Sacramento Republic FC	32	8	12	12	36	42	−6	36	
8	Las Vegas Lights FC	32	6	23	3	41	77	−36	21	

Source: USL
Rules for classification: 1) points; 2) head-to-head points; 3) head-to-head goal differential; 4) total points earned against in-division opponents; 5) total regular season wins against in-division opponents; 6) total goal differential against in-division opponents; 7) total goals scored against in-division opponents; 8) disciplinary points; 9) coin toss or drawing of lots.

==== Results summary ====
Overall								Home						Away					
Pld	W	D	L	GF	GA	GD	Pts	W	D	L	GF	GA	GD	W	D	L	GF	GA	GD
7	3	2	2	15	9	+6	11	1	2	2	9	6	+3	2	0	0	6	3	+3

Source: Match reports

Round	1	2	3	4	5	6	7	8	9	10	11	12	13	14	15	16	17	18	19	20	21	22	23	24	25	26	27	28	29	30	31	32
Stadium	H	H	H	A	H	H	A	A	A	H	H	A	A	H	A	H	H	A	A	A	H	A	H	A	A	H	H	A	A	H	A	H
Result	L	W	D	W	D	L	W	P	L	L	D																					

Updated to match(es) played on June 27, 2021. Source: Match reports
A = Away; H = Home; W = Win; D = Draw; L = Loss; P = Postponed

==== Regular season ====
All times in Pacific Time Zone.

=== April ===
April 30 1	LA Galaxy II	0–1	Sacramento Republic FC	Carson, California
19:30	Hernandez (yellow card) 17'; Picazo (yellow card) 71'	Report	Iwasa (yellow card) 29'; Gomez (yellow card) 57'; Alashe (yellow card) 61'; Luis Felipe (yellow card) 76'; Bone 82'; Taintor (yellow card) 84'	Stadium: Dignity Health Sports Park; Referee: Michael Radchuk

=== May ===
May 5 2	LA Galaxy II	5–0	Las Vegas Lights FC	Carson, California
19:30	Ferkranus (yellow card) 34'; Koreniuk 48'; Uche 57' (o.g.); Aguirre 59'; Vom Steeg (yellow card) 62'; Hernandez 82'; Judd 90'	Report	Duke (yellow card) 61'; Sepulveda (yellow card) 76'; Uche (yellow card) 80'	Stadium: Dignity Health Sports Park; Referee: Mark Allatin

May 9 3	LA Galaxy II	1–1	Tacoma Defiance	Carson, California
17:00	González (yellow card) 13'; Vazquez (yellow card) 48'; Hernandez 78'; Lambe (yellow card) 80'	Report	Mueller (yellow card) 35'; O. Vargas (yellow card) 37'; Rayyan (yellow card) 63'; Anguiano (yellow card) 77'; Cissoko 90+6' (pen.)	Stadium: Dignity Health Sports Park; Referee: Ricardo Fierro

May 14 4	Real Monarchs	0–2	LA Galaxy II	Herriman, Utah
18:00	Orozco (yellow card) 13'; Bancé (yellow card) 54'; Brown (yellow card) 56'	Report	González (yellow card) 19'; Koreniuk 24'; Judd 44'; Ferkranus (yellow card) 90'	Stadium: Zions Bank Stadium; Attendance: 1,715; Referee: Elijio Arreguin

May 19 5	LA Galaxy II	1–1	Sporting Kansas City II	Carson, California
19:30	Vázquez (yellow card) 42'; Hernandez 73'	Report	Čuić (yellow card) 23'; Rešetar 60'; Mushagalusa (yellow card) 82'	Stadium: Dignity Health Sports Park; Referee: Brad Jensen

May 23 6	LA Galaxy II	2–3	Oakland Roots SC	Carson, California
17:00	Picazo 31'; Mbumba 61' (o.g.); Judd (yellow card) 81'	Report	Flores (yellow card) 20', (goal) 47'; Diaz 76'; Bokila 90+1'	Stadium: Dignity Health Sports Park; Referee: Brandon Stevis

May 29 7	Orange County SC	3–4	LA Galaxy II	Irvine, California
19:00	Wehan 33', (yellow card) 41'; Orozco (yellow card) 37'; Markkanen 58'; Kuningas 67'	Report	Judd 4'; Drack 13', (yellow card) 61'; Hernandez 39' (pen.), 88', (yellow card) 89'; Ferkranus (yellow card) 47'; González (yellow card) 70'; Vom Steeg (yellow card) 90+2'	Stadium: Championship Soccer Stadium; Referee: Joseph Salinas

=== June ===
June 4 8	Charleston Battery	Postponed	LA Galaxy II	Charleston, South Carolina
16:00				Stadium: MUSC Health Stadium

June 12 9	San Diego Loyal SC	2–1	LA Galaxy II	San Diego, California
19:30	Alejandro Guido 75'; Adams (yellow card) 76'; Berry 84'; Hertzog (yellow card) 85'; Muse (yellow card) 87'; Jack Blake (yellow card) 90+4'; Stoneman (yellow card) 90+5'	Report	Acosta (yellow card) 22'; Hernandez 61'; Vázquez (yellow card) 90+1'	Stadium: Torero Stadium; Attendance: 2,033; Referee: Ricardo Fierro

June 16 10	LA Galaxy II	3–4	Las Vegas Lights FC	Carson, California
19:30	Judd 5', 41', 68': Perez (yellow card) 70'	Report	Quezada 9': Musovski 13'; Traore (yellow card) 16'; Molina (yellow card) 45+2'; Torres 61', 63'; Vazquez (yellow card) 90'; Romero (yellow card) 90+2'	Stadium: Dignity Health Sports Park; Referee: William Hoffman

June 23 11	LA Galaxy II	1–1	Orange County SC	Carson, California
19:30	Judd 10', (yellow card) 65'; González (yellow card) 45+1'	Report	Damus 4', (yellow card) 59'	Stadium: Dignity Health Sports Park; Referee: Melvin Rivas

June 27 12	Tacoma Defiance	2–0	LA Galaxy II	Tacoma, Washington
13:30	Serrano 52', 60'	Report	Harvey (yellow card) 41'	Stadium: Cheney Stadium; Attendance: 924; Referee: Luis Guardia

=== July ===
July 3 13	Phoenix Rising FC	3–0	LA Galaxy II	Chandler, Arizona
19:30	Schmitt 19'; Asante 46'; Moar 66'; Bakero (yellow card) 90+2'	Report	Vázquez (yellow card) 58'	Stadium: Phoenix Rising Soccer Complex at Wild Horse Pass; Attendance: 8,815; Referee: Joshua Encarnación

July 11 14	LA Galaxy II	1–1	Tacoma Defiance	Carson, California
17:00	Drack (yellow card) 44'; Mendoza 55' (o.g.)	Report	Ocampo-Chavez 16'; Robles (yellow card) 78'	Stadium: Dignity Health Sports Park; Referee: Mark Allatin

July 17 15	Phoenix Rising FC	5–0	LA Galaxy II	Chandler, Arizona
19:30	Musa 33'; Asante 40'; Dadashov 45'; Egbo 78', 90'; King (yellow card) 87'	Report	Hernandez (yellow card) 45+2'; Davila (yellow card) 55'; Harvey (yellow card) 63'; González (yellow card) 87'	Stadium: Phoenix Rising Soccer Complex at Wild Horse Pass; Attendance: 827; Referee: Matthew Corrigan

July 25 16	LA Galaxy II	3–0	Oakland Roots SC	Carson, California
17:00	Hernandez (yellow card) 22', (goal) 85'; Drack 33'; Harvey (yellow card) 35', (goal) 78'; Essengue (yellow card) 46'	Report	Ward (yellow card) 62'; Hernández (yellow card) 71'; Harish (yellow card) 68'; Blackwood (yellow card) 90+2'	Stadium: Dignity Health Sports Park; Referee: Matthew Thompson

=== August ===
August 1 17	LA Galaxy II	0–2	San Diego Loyal SC	Carson, California
17:00	Hernandez (yellow card) 29'; Gonzalez (yellow card) 76'; Harvey (yellow card) 90'	Report	Hertzog 9', (yellow card) 14'; Adams (yellow card) 16'; Moshobane 23'	Stadium: Dignity Health Sports Park; Referee: Ekaterina Koroleva

August 7 18	Orange County SC	2–3	LA Galaxy II	Irvine, California
19:00	Wehan 30'; Orozco (yellow card) 56'; Damus 67'	Report	Vázquez (yellow card) 22'; Judd 45'; Harvey (yellow card) 57', (goal) 62'; Bawa (yellow card) 65'; Hernandez (yellow card) 74'; Aguirre 87'; Vom Steeg (yellow card) 90+5'	Stadium: Championship Soccer Stadium; Attendance: 3,991; Referee: Greg Dopka

August 14 19	Oakland Roots SC	2–1	LA Galaxy II	Oakland, California
19:00 PDT (UTC-07)	Ornstil (yellow card) 11', (goal) 25'; Harish 26', (yellow card) 66'; Hernández (yellow card) 40'; Ward (yellow card) 56'	Report	Hernandez 12'; Lambe (red card) 22'; Harvey (yellow card) 68'; Vázquez (yellow card) 90+2'	Stadium: Laney College Football Stadium; Attendance: 3,451; Referee: Sergii Demianchuk

August 27 20	Las Vegas Lights FC	2–3	LA Galaxy II	Las Vegas, Nevada
7:30 PM PDT (UTC-07)	Musovski (yellow card) 31', (goal) 36'; Sepulveda 89'; Leone (red card) 90+2'	Report	Judd 39'; Harvey (yellow card) 59'; Hernandez 70' (pen.); Dunbar (yellow card) 84'; Cabral 90'	Stadium: Cashman Field; Referee: Héctor Hernández

=== September ===
September 1 21	LA Galaxy II	3–3	Sacramento Republic FC	Carson, California
17:00	Bawa (yellow card) 28'; Judd 32', (yellow card) 67', (goal) 79'; Davila (yellow card) 38'; Aguirre (yellow card) 57'; Neal (yellow card) 58'; Vázquez (yellow card) 67'; Koreniuk (yellow card) 74'; Hernandez 85' (pen.)	Report	Iwasa 16' (pen.), 89' (pen.); Lacroix 29'; Wheeler-Omiunu (yellow card) 35'; Diaz (yellow card) 84'; Cuello (yellow card) 90'	Stadium: Dignity Health Sports Park; Referee: William Hoffman

September 5 22	San Diego Loyal SC	4–2	LA Galaxy II	San Diego, California
15:00	Williams 11'; Stoneman (yellow card) 26'; Hertzog 41', 65'; Martin (yellow card) 68'; Moshobane 79'	Report	Drack (yellow card) 17'; Bawa (yellow card) 21'; Koreniuk 63'; Cabral 87'; Chávez (yellow card) 90+5'	Stadium: Torero Stadium; Attendance: 3,600; Referee: Jonathan Bilinski

September 11 23	LA Galaxy II	3–4	Phoenix Rising FC	Carson, California
19:30	Cabral 12', (yellow card) 50'; Vázquez 27'; Judd (yellow card) 60'; Perez (yellow card) 80', (goal) 86'	Report	Farrell (yellow card) 19' (red card) 80'; Quinn 21' (pen.); Lambert 31'; Moar 35'; Schmitt (yellow card) 37'; Musa (yellow card) 72'; Vázquez 90+5' (o.g.)	Stadium: Dignity Health Sports Park; Track & Field Stadium; Referee: Ricardo Fierro

September 18 24	Oakland Roots SC	0–1	LA Galaxy II	Oakland, California
19:00		Report	Davila 75' (pen.); Hernandez (yellow card) 85'; Drack (yellow card) 90'; Zubak (yellow card) 90+2'	Stadium: Laney College Football Stadium; Attendance: 4,802; Referee: Elvis Osmanovic

September 26 25	Sacramento Republic FC	0–2	LA Galaxy II	Sacramento, California
2:00 PM	Kibunguchy (yellow card) 36'; Fernandes (yellow card) 79'	Report	Perez (yellow card) 3'; Neal 67'; Judd (yellow card) 88'; Dunbar 90'	Stadium: Heart Health Park; Attendance: 9,265; Referee: Matthew Corrigan

September 29 26	LA Galaxy II	3–0	Phoenix Rising FC	Carson, California
7:30	Delgado 77' (o.g.); Judd (yellow card) 85', (goal) 88'; Hernandez 90+1'	Report	Seijas (yellow card) 27'; Schmitt (red card) 45+2'; Madrid (yellow card) 56'	Stadium: Dignity Health Sports Park; Referee: Benjamin Meyer

=== October ===
October 2 27	LA Galaxy II	0–3	San Diego Loyal SC	Carson, California
7:30 PM	Harvey (yellow card) 38'; Acosta (yellow card) 38'; Dunbar (yellow card) 57'; Calderón (yellow card) 79'	Report	Yaro 25'; C. Martin (yellow card) 33'; Stoneman (yellow card) 38'; E. Martin 41'; Adams 82'	Stadium: Dignity Health Sports Park; Referee: Kevin Broadley

October 8 28	Las Vegas Lights FC	0–1	LA Galaxy II	Las Vegas, Nevada
7:00 PM	Trejo (yellow card) 55'	Report	Hernandez 8'; Zubak (yellow card) 89'	Stadium: Cashman Field; Referee: Thomas Snyder

October 13 29	Sacramento Republic FC	1–1	LA Galaxy II	Sacramento, California
7:30 PM	Casey (yellow card) 65'; Formella 87'; Fernandes (yellow card) 90'	Report	Drack (yellow card) 25'; Harvey (yellow card) 55'; Judd 57'	Stadium: Heart Health Park; Attendance: 8,636; Referee: Michael Radchuk

October 17 30	LA Galaxy II	5–0	El Paso Locomotive FC	Carson, California
5:00 PM	Vázquez (yellow card) 5'; Harvey 7'; Judd 17', 30'; Hernandez 69'; Ferkranus (yellow card) 75'; Dunbar 90+3'	Report	Fox (yellow card) 22'; Carrijo (yellow card) 40'; Aguinaga (yellow card) 49'; Solignac (yellow card) 58'	Stadium: Dignity Health Sports Park; Referee: Brad Jensen

October 20 8	Charleston Battery	3–1	LA Galaxy II	Charleston, South Carolina
4:00 PM	Pérez 2'; Gdula (yellow card) 52'; Piggott 72'; Harmon (yellow card) 88'; Lewis 89'	Report	Drack (yellow card) 55'; Aguirre 71'	Stadium: MUSC Health Stadium; Attendance: 2,858; Referee: Elton García
Note: Makeup game from June 4 postponement

October 24 31	Tacoma Defiance	3–2	LA Galaxy II	Tacoma, Washington
1:30 PM	Serrano 10', (yellow card) 74'; Mueller (yellow card) 45+2'; Adeniran 54', 70'; Brewitt (yellow card) 89'	Report	Hernandez (yellow card) 17'; Judd 63', 73'	Stadium: Starfire Sports Complex; Attendance: 1,475; Referee: Matthew Corrigan

October 30 32	LA Galaxy II	0–1	Orange County SC	Carson, California
7:30 PM	Judd (yellow card) 74'	Report	Kiernan (yellow card) 30'; Casiple (yellow card) 77'; Damus (yellow card) 90'; Enevoldsen 90+4'	Stadium: Dignity Health Sports Park; Referee: Ricardo Fierro

== See also ==
- 2021 in American soccer
- 2021 LA Galaxy season
