= 2024 Ventura County FC season =

Ventura County FC
2024 season
- Head coach: Matt Taylor
- Stadium: Williams Rolland Stadium
- MLS Next Pro: Pacific Division: TBD; Western Conference: TBD; Overall: TBD
- MLS Next Pro Playoffs: TBD

The 2024 season for Ventura County FC is the club's 11th season in existence, their second in the MLS Next Pro, the third tier of American soccer. It was their first season under the Ventura County FC name after LA Galaxy II was renamed.

== Squad information ==
As of July 5, 2024

No.	Pos.	Player	Nation
12	DF	USA	Marcus Ferkranus
18	MF	MEX	Jonathan Pérez
19	DF	USA	Mauricio Cuevas
21	MF	USA	Tucker Lepley
24	DF	USA	Jalen Neal
25	DF	COL	Emiro Garcés
29	FW	CMR	Aaron Bibout
30	FW	CRC	Gino Vivi
31	GK	USA	Brady Scott
48	MF	MEX	Diego López
50	DF	USA	Riley Dalgado
51	DF	CMR	Ascel Essengue
53	MF	USA	David Díaz
55	DF	USA	Carlos Diaz
60	GK	USA	Nolan Anderson
61	MF	USA	Sean Karani
64	DF	USA	Jose Magaña
66	DF	USA	Matteo Carbone
67	DF	CMR	Christian Tchouante
68	DF	AUS	Max Middleby
71	FW	USA	Erik Hernandez
72	MF	ARG	Nicolas Schelotto
73	DF	USA	Enrique Martinez
74	FW	USA	Sergio Villalpando
75	DF	USA	Harbor Miller
81	GK	USA	Lucca Adams
83	DF	USA	Allan Legaspi
84	MF	USA	Ruben Ramos Jr.
87	MF	USA	Gabriel Arnold
90	DF	USA	Emiliano Garcia
91	GK	USA	Owen Pratt
94	MF	USA	Garcia Omar
95	MF	USA	Javier Corona
97	DF	USA	Victor Casillas

Signed to first team contract with LA Galaxy.
LA Galaxy Academy player.

== Competitions ==
=== MLS Next Pro ===
==== Western Confernece ====
Pos	Div	Team	Pld	W	SOW	SOL	L	GF	GA	GD	Pts	Qualification
4	PC	Tacoma Defiance	28	13	2	3	10	59	53	+6	46	Qualification for the Playoffs
5	PC	Los Angeles FC 2	28	12	3	3	10	51	54	−3	45	Qualification for the Playoffs
6	PC	Ventura County FC	28	8	8	3	9	49	49	0	43	Qualification for the Playoffs
7	PC	Whitecaps FC 2	28	10	3	4	11	45	44	+1	40	Qualification for the Playoffs
8	FR	Houston Dynamo 2	28	10	2	5	11	46	45	+1	39	Qualification for the Playoffs

Source: MLSNP Western Conference
Rules for classification: 1) points; 2) total wins; 3) total goal differential; 4) total goals scored; 5) fewer disciplinary points; 6) away goal differential; 7) away goals scored; 8) home goals differential; 9) home goals scored; 10) coin toss (2 clubs tied) or drawing of lots (≥3 clubs tied)

==== Overall ====
Pos	Team	Pld	W	SOW	SOL	L	GF	GA	GD	Pts
14	Chattanooga FC	28	9	8	2	9	45	42	+3	45
15	Carolina Core FC	28	12	3	1	12	39	45	−6	43
16	Ventura County FC	28	8	8	3	9	49	49	0	43
17	Whitecaps FC 2	28	10	3	4	11	45	44	+1	40
18	New York Red Bulls II	28	10	4	2	12	56	61	−5	40

Source: MLSNP
Rules for classification: 1) points; 2) total wins; 3) total goal differential; 4) total goals scored; 5) fewer disciplinary points; 6) away goal differential; 7) away goals scored; 8) home goals differential; 9) home goals scored; 10) coin toss (2 clubs tied) or drawing of lots (≥3 clubs tied)

== Competitive fixtures ==
Competition	First match	Last match	Starting round	Final position	Record							
Competition	First match	Last match	Starting round	Final position	Pld	W	D	L	GF	GA	GD	Win %
MLS Next Pro season	March 17, 2024	TBD	Matchday 1	TBD	17	13	0	4	33	27	+6	76.47
Total					17	13	0	4	33	27	+6	76.47

Last updated: July 11, 2024
Source: Soccerway

=== Regular season ===
All times in Pacific Time Zone

=== March ===
March 17 1	Ventura County FC	2–1	The Town FC	Carson, California
		Report		Stadium: Dignity Health Sports Park; Referee: Servando Berna

March 24 2	Sporting Kansas City II	1–3	Ventura County FC	Lawrence, Kansas
		Report		Stadium: Rock Chalk Park; Referee: Calin Radosav

March 31 3	Ventura County FC	5–2	Tacoma Defiance	Carson, California
		Report		Stadium: Dignity Health Sports Park; Referee: Matt Thompson

=== April ===
April 7 4	Ventura County FC	2–1	Whitecaps FC 2	Carson, California
		Report		Stadium: Dignity Health Sports Park; Referee: Brandon Stevis

April 14 5	Los Angeles FC 2	2–1	Ventura County FC	Fullerton, California
		Report		Stadium: Titan Stadium; Referee: Benjamin Meyer

April 20 6	Ventura County FC	1–1 (10–8 SO)	Sporting Kansas City II	Carson, California
		Report		Stadium: Dignity Health Sports Park; Referee: Mark Verso

April 26 7	Austin FC II	2–2 (4–5 SO)	Ventura County FC	Austin, Texas
		Report		Stadium: Parmer Field; Referee: Elijio Arreguin

=== May ===
May 12 8	Minnesota United FC 2	1–0	Ventura County FC	Blaine, Minnesota
		Report		Stadium: National Sports Center Stadium; Referee: Ryan Shanklin

May 19 9	Ventura County FC	2–0	Real Monarchs	Thousand Oaks, California
		Report		Stadium: William Rolland Stadium; Referee: Jamie Padilla

May 26 10	Whitecaps FC 2	1–0	Ventura County FC	Burnaby, British Columbia
		Report		Stadium: Swangard Stadium; Referee: Niko Jecanski

May 31 11	Ventura County FC	3–2	Tacoma Defiance	Thousand Oaks, California
		Report		Stadium: William Rolland Stadium; Referee: Iryna Petrunok

=== June ===
June 9 12	Portland Timbers 2	3–3 (2–3 SO)	Ventura County FC	Portland, Oregon
		Report		Stadium: Providence Park; Referee: Corbyn May

June 16 13	Colorado Rapids 2	2–2 (2–4 SO)	Ventura County FC	Denver, Colorado
		Report		Stadium: University of Denver Soccer Stadium; Referee: Jeremy Scheer

June 23 14	Ventura County FC	2–3	Whitecaps FC 2	Thousand Oaks, California
		Report		Stadium: William Rolland Stadium; Referee: Brad Jensen

June 30 15	The Town FC	3–3 (5–6 SO)	Ventura County FC	Moraga, California
		Report		Stadium: Saint Mary's Soccer Stadium; Referee: Brandon Stevis

=== July ===
July 5 16	Ventura County FC	1–1 (3–2 SO)	Houston Dynamo 2	Thousand Oaks, California
		Report		Stadium: William Rolland Stadium; Referee: Jaclyn Mets

July 14 17	Los Angeles FC 2	1–1 (4–5 SO)	Ventura County FC	Fullerton, California
		Report		Stadium: Titan Stadium; Referee: Katja Koroleva

July 22 18	Ventura County FC	0–0 (2–3 SO)	Portland Timbers 2	Thousand Oaks, California
		Report		Stadium: William Rolland Stadium; Referee: Adam Zarrin

July 28 19	Ventura County FC	v	The Town FC	TBD
		Report		Stadium: TBD

=== August ===
August 2 20	St. Louis City 2	v	Ventura County FC	St. Louis, Missouri
		Report		Stadium: CITYPARK

August 11 21	Ventura County FC	v	Los Angeles FC 2	TBD
		Report		Stadium: TBD

August 18 22	Tacoma Defiance	v	Ventura County FC	Tukwila, Washington
		Report		Stadium: Starfire Sports Complex

August 25 23	Ventura County FC	v	Real Monarchs	TBD
		Report		Stadium: TBD

=== September ===
September 8 24	Houston Dynamo 2	v	Ventura County FC	Houston, Texas
		Report		Stadium: SaberCats Stadium

September 15 25	Ventura County FC	v	North Texas SC	TBD
		Report		Stadium: TBD

September 17 26	Portland Timbers 2	v	Ventura County FC	Portland, Oregon
		Report		Stadium: Providence Park

September 29 27	Ventura County FC	v	St. Louis City 2	Thousand Oaks, California
		Report		Stadium: William Rolland Stadium

=== October ===
October 6 28	Real Monarchs	v	Ventura County FC	Herriman, Utah
		Report		Stadium: Zions Bank Stadium

== See also ==
- 2024 LA Galaxy season
