= Schelotto =

Schelotto is an Italian surname. Notable people with the surname include:

- Ezequiel Schelotto (born 1989), Argentine-Italian footballer
- Guillermo Barros Schelotto (born 1973), Argentine footballer
- Gustavo Barros Schelotto (born 1973), Argentine footballer
