= Marcus Ferkranus =

American soccer player

Personal information
- Full name: Marcus Ashton Ferkranus
- Date of birth: May 10, 2003 (age 23)
- Place of birth: Santa Clarita, California, U.S.
- Height: 6 ft 0 in (1.83 m)
- Position: Central defender

Team information
- Current team: Avondale FC

Youth career
- 2017–2019: LA Galaxy

Senior career*
Years	Team	Apps	(Gls)
2019–2024	LA Galaxy II	10	(1)
2021–2024	LA Galaxy	0	(0)
2022	→ Phoenix Rising (loan)	5	(0)
2024–2026	Brisbane Roar	0	(0)
2026–	Avondale FC	14	(0)

International career^{‡}
2022–2023	United States U20	12	(0)
- * Club domestic league appearances and goals as of 20 September 2026 ‡ National team caps and goals as of May 23, 2023

Marcus Ashton Ferkranus (/ˈfɜːr.krə.nəs/; born May 10, 2003) is a professional soccer player who plays for Avondale FC in NPL Victoria. Born in the United States, he has opted to represent Australia internationally.

== Club career ==
=== LA Galaxy ===
Ferkranus joined the LA Galaxy academy in 2017, at the age of 14. In July 2020, he made his professional debut for the Galaxy's USL Championship affiliate, LA Galaxy II, coming on as an 81st-minute substitute for Jesús Vázquez in a 4–0 defeat to Phoenix Rising. After making just five appearances throughout the shortened 2020 season, Ferkranus became a regular for the team in 2021, tallying 26 appearances, 16 of which were starts. Ankle and groin injuries ultimately limited his minutes in 2022, and he would make just four competitive appearances for the club over the course of the year.

In January 2021, Ferkranus was signed to a first-team contract with LA Galaxy. However, Ferkranus did not make a first team appearance before departing the club in June 2024.

==== Phoenix Rising (loan) ====
Ferkranus joined USL Championship club Phoenix Rising FC on a loan on July 26, 2022.

=== Brisbane Roar ===
Ferkranus signed two year contract with the A-League side Brisbane Roar. As Marcus's mother was born in Sydney, he will not take up an international visa spot.

== International career ==
Ferkranus is a youth international for the United States. He has represented the under-20 side at the 2022 CONCACAF U-20 Championship and the 2023 FIFA U-20 World Cup. Ferkranus also holds an Australian passport which makes him eligible to represent the Socceroos. He is also of Canadian and Jamaican descent.

On August 29, 2025, Ferkranus' request to change sports citizenship from American to Australian was approved by FIFA.

== Career statistics ==
=== Club ===
As of match played July 23, 2024

Appearances and goals by club, season and competition
Club	Season	League			National cup		Continental		Other		Total	
Club	Season	Division	Apps	Goals	Apps	Goals	Apps	Goals	Apps	Goals	Apps	Goals
LA Galaxy II	2019	USL Championship	0	0	—		—		—		0	0
LA Galaxy II	2020	USL Championship	5	0	—		—		—		5	0
LA Galaxy II	2021	USL Championship	26	0	—		—		—		26	0
LA Galaxy II	2022	USL Championship	4	0	—		—		—		4	0
LA Galaxy II	2023	MLS Next Pro	20	0	—		—		—		20	0
LA Galaxy II	2024	MLS Next Pro	8	0	1 (Note: Appearance in U.S. Open Cup)	0	—		—		9	0
LA Galaxy II	Total		63	0	1	0	—		—		64	0
Phoenix Rising (loan)	2022	USL Championship	5	0	—		—		—		5	0
Brisbane Roar	2024–25	A-League Men	0	0	1 (Note: Appearance in Australia Cup)	0	—		—		1	0
Career total			68	0	2	0	0	0	0	0	70	0

== Honors ==
United States U20

- CONCACAF U-20 Championship: 2022
