= José Serrano =

José Serrano may refer to:

- José Serrano (composer) (1873–1941), Spanish zarzuela composer
- José Serrano (Ecuadorian politician) (born 1970), Ecuadorian political figure, Minister of the Interior
- José Serrano (footballer, born 1981), Spanish footballer
- José Serrano (footballer, born 2002), Venezuelan footballer
- José Serrano Palma (fl. 1950s), Chilean politician
- José António Serrano (1851–1904), Portuguese physician and anatomist
- José E. Serrano (born 1943), member of the U.S. House of Representatives for a portion of The Bronx, New York
- José M. Serrano (born 1972), his son, New York State Senator
- José Mariano Serrano (1788–1852), Bolivian member of the Congress of Tucumán
- Rosso José Serrano (born 1942), Colombian police officer
- José María Galante Serrano (1948–2020), Spanish activist known as Chato Galante

== See also ==
- José Serrano Adobe, historical building in the U.S. state of California
