= Adam Saldana =

American soccer player

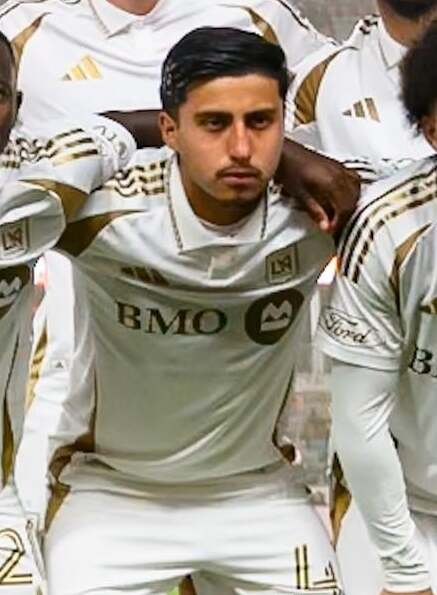
- Saldana with Los Angeles FC in 2025

Personal information
- Full name: Adam Jesus Jr. Esparza-Saldana
- Date of birth: February 7, 2002 (age 24)
- Place of birth: Panorama City, Los Angeles, California, US
- Height: 5 ft 8 in (1.73 m)
- Position: Midfielder

Youth career
- 2015–2018: Real So Cal
- 2018–2019: LA Galaxy

Senior career*
Years	Team	Apps	(Gls)
2018–2021	LA Galaxy II	25	(0)
2021–2022	LA Galaxy	19	(0)
2021–2022	→ LA Galaxy II (loan)	17	(0)
2023	LA Galaxy II	23	(0)
2024	KFUM Oslo	2	(0)
2025	Los Angeles FC	2	(0)
2025	→ Los Angeles FC 2 (loan)	12	(1)

International career^{‡}
2017	United States U15	5	(0)
2017–2019	United States U17	17	(1)
- * Club domestic league appearances and goals as of 02:10, January 4, 2026 (UTC) ‡ National team caps and goals as of October 13, 2019

Adam Jesus Jr. Esparza-Saldana (born February 7, 2002) is an American professional soccer player who plays as a midfielder.

== Club career ==
Saldana made his professional debut in a 1–0 loss to Reno 1868 on September 15, 2018, coming on as a 31st-minute substitute for Andre Zanga.

On January 19, 2021, Saldana was signed to LA Galaxy's MLS roster.

On March 27, 2024, newly promoted Norwegian top-flight side KFUM Oslo announced that they had signed Saldana on a two-year contract.

On March 1, 2025, Saldana returned to the United States and signed with Los Angeles FC through 2025 and with club options for 2026 and 2027. At the end of the season, Saldana's contract option was declined.

== International career ==
Born in the United States, Saldana who is of Mexican descent, represented the United States national under-17 team at the 2019 FIFA U-17 World Cup.

== Personal life ==
Saldana is of Mexican descent and holds dual American and Mexican citizenship.

== Career statistics ==
=== Club ===
As of October 5, 2025

Club	Season	League			National cup (Note: Includes Norwegian Cup and U.S. Open Cup)		Other		Total	
Club	Season	Division	Apps	Goals	Apps	Goals	Apps	Goals	Apps	Goals
LA Galaxy II	2018	United Soccer League	2	0	—		—		2	0
LA Galaxy II	2019	USL Championship	8	0	—		—		8	0
LA Galaxy II	2020	USL Championship	15	0	—		1 (Note: Appearance in USL Cup Playoffs)	0	16	0
LA Galaxy II	Total		25	0	—		1	0	26	0
LA Galaxy	2021	Major League Soccer	18	0	—		—		18	0
LA Galaxy	2022	Major League Soccer	1	0	—		—		1	0
LA Galaxy	Total		19	0	—		—		19	0
LA Galaxy II (loan)	2021	USL Championship	2	0	—		—		2	0
LA Galaxy II (loan)	2022	USL Championship	15	0	—		—		15	0
LA Galaxy II	2023	MLS Next Pro	23	0	—		—		23	0
LA Galaxy II	Total		40	0	—		—		40	0
KFUM Oslo	2024	Eliteserien	2	0	4	0	—		6	0
Los Angeles FC	2025	Major League Soccer	2	0	0	0	2 (Note: Appearances in Leagues Cup)	0	4	0
Los Angeles FC II (loan)	2025	MLS Next Pro	12	1	1	0	—		13	1
Career total			100	0	5	0	3	0	108	0
