= Adrián González (footballer, born 2003) =

American-Mexican footballer (born 2003)

Personal information
- Full name: Adrián González Mendoza
- Date of birth: 23 June 2003 (age 23)
- Place of birth: Santa Rosa, California, United States
- Height: 1.75 m (5 ft 9 in)
- Position: Midfielder

Team information
- Current team: Austin FC II
- Number: 8

Youth career
- 2018–2019: Pachuca
- 2019–2020: LA Galaxy

Senior career*
Years	Team	Apps	(Gls)
2020–2023	LA Galaxy II	84	(2)
2024	Columbus Crew 2	24	(3)
2025–	Austin FC II	46	(0)

International career^{‡}
2019	Mexico U16	4	(0)
2021	Mexico U19	1	(0)
- * Club domestic league appearances and goals as of 23:33, 21 September 2026 (UTC) ‡ National team caps and goals as of 1 October 2020

Adrián González Mendoza (born 23 June 2003) is a professional footballer who plays as a midfielder for MLS Next Pro club Austin FC II. Born in the United States, he played for the Mexico national under-19 team.

== Career ==
=== Youth ===
After drawing reported interest from clubs in Spain, Mexico and the United States, González joined the Pachuca academy in December 2018. He soon returned to the United States to join the LA Galaxy academy in 2019. In 2020, González played with LA Galaxy's USL Championship side LA Galaxy II.

=== Professional ===
==== LA Galaxy II ====
In April 2021, LA Galaxy II announced that it had signed González to a professional contract ahead of the 2021 season.

==== Columbus Crew 2 ====
In February 2025, Columbus Crew 2 announced it had signed González for the 2024 season.

==== Austin FC II ====
In February 2025, Austin FC II announced it had signed González through the 2026 season with a one-year option.

== International career ==
Born in the United States to Mexican parents, González is eligible to represent both the United States and Mexico internationally. He has represented the latter at the under-16 and under-17 levels.

== Personal ==
Adrián's older brother is Jonathan González.

== Career statistics ==
=== Club ===
As of matches played October 18, 2026

Appearances and goals by club, season and competition
Club	Season	League			League Cup		National Cup		Continental		Total	
Club	Season	Division	Apps	Goals	Apps	Goals	Apps	Goals	Apps	Goals	Apps	Goals
LA Galaxy II	2020	USL Championship	7	0	1 (Note: Includes appearance in USL Championship playoffs)	0	–		–		8	0
LA Galaxy II	2021	USL Championship	21	0	–		–		0	0	21	0
LA Galaxy II	2022	USL Championship	30	0	–		–		–		30	0
LA Galaxy II	2023	MLS Next Pro	25	2	–		–		–		25	2
LA Galaxy II	Total		83	2	1	0	0	0	0	0	84	2
Columbus Crew 2	2024	MLS Next Pro	28	3	3 (Note: Includes appearances in MLS Next Pro playoffs)	0	–		–		28	3
Columbus Crew 2	Total		28	3	3	0	0	0	0	0	31	3
Austin FC II	2025	MLS Next Pro	27	0	–		–		–		27	0
Austin FC II	2026	MLS Next Pro	19	0	2	0	–		–		21	0
Austin FC II	Total		46	0	2	0	0	0	0	0	48	0
Career total			157	5	6	0	0	0	0	0	163	5

== Honors ==
Austin FC II

- MLS Next Pro: Regular Season Champion – 2026
