= Carson Klein =

American soccer player

Personal information
- Full name: Carson Christopher Klein
- Date of birth: February 1, 2002 (age 24)
- Place of birth: Kansas City, Kansas, United States
- Height: 6 ft 2 in (1.88 m)
- Position: Forward

Youth career
- 2016–2020: LA Galaxy

College career
Years	Team	Apps	(Gls)
2020–2021	Cal Poly Mustangs	5	(0)

Senior career*
Years	Team	Apps	(Gls)
2020	LA Galaxy II	4	(0)
2023–2024	Ventura County FC	2	(0)
2024	Sporting Kansas City II	2	(0)
- * Club domestic league appearances and goals as of September 15, 2022

Carson Christopher Klein (born February 1, 2002) is an American soccer player.

== Career ==
=== Youth ===
Klein joined the LA Galaxy academy in 2016, where he played until 2020. In 2020, Klein also played with LA Galaxy's USL Championship affiliate LA Galaxy II. He first appeared for the team on August 19, 2020, as a 78th-minute substitute during a 4–1 loss to Phoenix Rising.

=== College ===
In July 2020, Klein committed to playing college soccer at California Polytechnic State University in the fall of 2020.

== Personal life ==
Carson is the son of Chris Klein, who played professional soccer for Kansas City Wizards, Real Salt Lake and LA Galaxy, as well as earning 22 caps for the United States national team. Chris is the former President of LA Galaxy, a position he held from 2013 to 2023 when he was let go.
