= Juan Cataldi =

Argentine professional footballer

Personal information
- Date of birth: 17 December 1998 (age 27)
- Place of birth: La Plata, Argentina
- Height: 1.72 m (5 ft 7 1/2 in)
- Position: Attacking midfielder

Team information
- Current team: Kalamata
- Number: 7

Youth career
- 2002–2018: Gimnasia y Esgrima

Senior career*
Years	Team	Apps	(Gls)
2018–2020	Gimnasia y Esgrima	6	(0)
2020	→ Bolívar (loan)	4	(0)
2021–2023	Ierapetra	45	(5)
2023–	Kalamata	67	(5)
- * Club domestic league appearances and goals as of 20 September 2026

Juan Cataldi (born 17 December 1998) is an Argentine professional footballer who plays as an attacking midfielder for Greek Super League club Kalamata.

He played his first match in the first division in the Argentine cup and then played matches in the same cup and in the local tournament. He was part of the team who played the final game against Rosario Central. When he was playing in Bolivar, he played in Copa Libertadores against Palmeiras and another two games in the same Cup. Also he played in Copa Sudamericana.

== Career ==
Cataldi's career started in Gimnasia y Esgrima's system in 2002. He was moved into the club's first-team squad in July 2018, when he was picked to start in Copa Argentina encounters with Sportivo Belgrano and Olimpo; both of which were won 1–0. He made his professional league debut on 18 August during a defeat away to Banfield in the Primera División. He would make a further three appearances in that season for Gimnasia, though wouldn't appear competitively in 2019–20. On 3 August 2020, Cataldi left on loan to Bolivian football with Bolívar. He debuted in the Copa Libertadores versus Palmeiras on 1 October.

In September 2021, he terminated his contract with Gimnasia y Esgrima La Plata and joined O.F. Ierapetra F.C. in the Greek Second Division. In September 2023, the transfer to Kalamata F.C. of the same Greek League will take place.

== Personal life ==
Cataldi is the nephew of former footballers Guillermo Barros Schelotto and Gustavo Barros Schelotto, while his brothers Salvador and Tomás Cataldi are also footballers; as are his cousins Nicolas and Bautista Barros Schelotto. Cataldi's grandfather Hugo Barros Schelotto was Gimnasia y Esgrima's president during the 1980s.

== Career statistics ==
As of 18 December 2020.

Club statistics
Club	Season	League			League Cup		Continental		Total	
Club	Season	Division	Apps	Goals	Apps	Goals	Apps	Goals	Apps	Goals
Gimnasia y Esgrima	2018–19	Argentine Primera División	4	0	4	0	—		8	0
Gimnasia y Esgrima	Total		4	0	4	0	—		8	0
Bolívar (loan)	2020	Bolivian Primera División	0	0	—		3 (Note: Appearance(s) in the Copa Libertadores and Copa Sudamericana)	0	3	0
		Total	0	0			4	0	4	0
OF Ierapetra	2021-22	Super league Greece 2	23	1	1	0				
OF Ierapetra	2022-23	Super league Greece 2	20	3	2	1			22	4
		Total	43	4	3	1			46	5
Career total			47	4	7	1	3	0	58	5
