= Bautista Barros Schelotto =

Argentine professional footballer

Personal information
- Full name: Bautista Barros Schelotto Suárez
- Date of birth: 13 January 2000 (age 26)
- Place of birth: La Plata, Argentina
- Height: 1.81 m (5 ft 11 in)
- Position: Right-back

Team information
- Current team: Gimnasia LP
- Number: 31

Youth career
- Gimnasia LP

Senior career*
Years	Team	Apps	(Gls)
2021–	Gimnasia LP	20	(1)
2022	→ Fénix (loan)	12	(0)
2024–2025	→ Platense (loan)	31	(0)
- * Club domestic league appearances and goals as of 17:27, 9 July 2026 (UTC)

Bautista Barros Schelotto Suárez (born 13 January 2000) is an Argentine professional footballer who plays as a right-back for Gimnasia La Plata.

== Career ==
Barros Schelotto joined the Gimnasia y Esgrima youth system at the age of six. He made his reserves debut on 7 August 2017 against Chacarita Juniors under Leandro Martini. Martini later, as joint first-team manager alongside Mariano Messera, promoted Barros Schelotto into the senior squad in early January 2021. He was initially selected on the substitutes' bench for Copa de la Liga Profesional matches with San Lorenzo, Unión Santa Fe and Atlético Tucumán. Barros Schelotto made his competitive debut for the club on 23 March during a Copa Argentina round of 32 victory over Primera C Metropolitana's Dock Sud.

== Personal life ==
Barros Schelotto is the nephew of former footballers Guillermo and Gustavo Barros Schelotto, while cousins Nicolás Barros Schelotto and Juan, Salvador and Tomás Cataldi also became footballers. His father, Pablo, had a stint as a goalkeeper in Gimnasia y Esgrima's academy before taking a career in medicine, while grandfather Hugo Barros Schelotto was Gimnasia president during the 1980s.

== Career statistics ==
As of 24 March 2021.

Appearances and goals by club, season and competition
Club	Season	League			Cup		League Cup		Continental		Other		Total	
Club	Season	Division	Apps	Goals	Apps	Goals	Apps	Goals	Apps	Goals	Apps	Goals	Apps	Goals
Gimnasia y Esgrima	2020–21 (Note: Soccerway counts 2020 Copa de la Liga Profesional appearances as league appearances.)	Primera División	0	0	0	0	0	0	—		0	0	0	0
Gimnasia y Esgrima	2021 (Note: Soccerway counts 2021 Copa de la Liga Profesional appearances as league appearances.)	Primera División	0	0	1	0	—		—		0	0	1	0
Career total			0	0	1	0	0	0	—		0	0	1	0

== Honours ==
Platense

- Argentine Primera División: 2025 Apertura
