= Nicolás Barros Schelotto =

Argentine association football player (born 2008)

Nicolás Schelotto
Personal information
- Full name: Nicolás Barros Schelotto
- Date of birth: 22 September 2006 (age 20)
- Position: Midfielder

Team information
- Current team: Gimnasia LP
- Number: 10

Youth career
- –2024: LA Galaxy

Senior career*
Years	Team	Apps	(Gls)
2023–2024	Ventura County	24	(0)
2024–	Gimnasia LP	29	(4)
- * Club domestic league appearances and goals as of 17:13, 3 October 2026 (UTC)

Nicolás Barros Schelotto (born 22 September 2006) is an Argentine professional footballer who plays as a midfielder for Gimnasia LP.

== Early and personal life ==
From a football family, his father Guillermo Barros Schelotto and uncle Gustavo were both footballers. His cousins, Bautista Barros Schelotto and Juan Cataldi are also both professional footballers. His grandfather Hugo Barros Schelotto was Gimnasia president during the 1980s.

== Career ==
A left-footed central midfielder, Schelotto was in the youth system at La Galaxy in the United States and featured for Ventura County in MLS Next Pro, prior to joining Gimnasia LP ahead of the 2025 season.

After featuring initially for the Gimnasia reserve team during the 2025 season, Schelotto made his senior debut for Gimnasia LP in the local derby against Estudiantes on 19 October 2025, in a 2–0 defeat. He went on to make seven first team league appearances for the club during that year.

In January 2026, Schelloto scored his first senior league goal for the club, a curling effort directly from a corner against Racing Club de Avellaneda in the opening game of the 2026 Primera División season.
