= Josh Drack =

American soccer player (born 1999)

Personal information
- Full name: Joshua Drack
- Date of birth: September 22, 1999 (age 27)
- Place of birth: Chandler, Arizona, United States
- Height: 1.70 m (5 ft 7 in)
- Positions: Full back; winger

Team information
- Current team: Portland Hearts of Pine
- Number: 99

Youth career
- 2011–2015: Arizona Arsenal
- 2015–2016: Real Salt Lake AZ
- 2016–2017: Portland Timbers

College career
| Years | Team | Apps | (Gls) |
| 2017–2018 | Grand Canyon Antelopes | 39 | (6) |
| 2019–2020 | Denver Pioneers | 21 | (5) |

Senior career*
| Years | Team | Apps | (Gls) |
| 2019 | Colorado Pride Switchbacks U23 | 6 | (2) |
| 2021–2022 | LA Galaxy II | 52 | (5) |
| 2021 | LA Galaxy | 1 | (0) |
| 2023 | Huntsville City | 25 | (1) |
| 2024–2025 | Charleston Battery | 28 | (0) |
| 2025–2026 | Westchester SC | 24 | (0) |
| 2026– | Portland Hearts of Pine | 20 | (0) |
- * Club domestic league appearances and goals as of October 25, 2026

Joshua Drack (born September 22, 1999) is an American soccer player who currently plays as a full back for Portland Hearts of Pine in the USL League One. A graduate of the University of Denver, Drack was selected 16th overall in the 2021 MLS SuperDraft by LA Galaxy. He previously played for LA Galaxy II, Huntsville City FC, Charleston Battery, and Westchester SC.

== Career ==
=== Youth ===
Drack was part of the Arizona Arsenal Soccer Club and Real Salt Lake academy in Arizona, before moving to the Portland Timbers academy in 2016. In addition, he was with the Chilean clubs Colo-Colo and Universidad Católica in a brief trial step at the age of 14.

=== College and amateur ===
In 2017, Drack went to play college soccer at Grand Canyon University. In two years with the Antelopes, Drack made 39 appearances, scoring six goals and tallying seven assists. Following his freshman season, Drack was named WAC Freshman of the Year, was named to the conference's All-Freshman team and All-Conference honorable mention. In 2019, Drack transferred to the University of Denver where he played a single season, scoring five goals and tallying three assists for the Pioneers. He was named Summit League Second Team and to the Summit League All-Newcomer Team. Drack's Senior season at Denver was cancelled due to the COVID-19 pandemic.

Drack also appeared for USL League Two side Colorado Pride Switchbacks U23 during their 2019 season.

=== Professional ===
On January 21, 2021, Drack was selected 16th overall in the 2021 MLS SuperDraft by LA Galaxy. On April 26, 2021, Drack signed with USL Championship side LA Galaxy II.

Drack made his professional debut on April 30, 2021, starting in a 1–0 loss to Sacramento Republic.

On July 7, 2021, Drack was added to LA Galaxy's MLS roster on a short-term loan. The same day he appeared for the team as an injury-time substitute during a 3–1 win over FC Dallas.

On February 6, 2023, Drack was announced as a new signing for MLS Next Pro side Huntsville City FC.

Drack signed a multi-year contract with USL Championship club Charleston Battery on December 13, 2023. On May 16, 2025, Drack was transferred to USL League One side Westchester SC.

On April 18, 2026, Drack moved to fellow USL League One side Portland Hearts of Pine. In a related move, the Hearts cut Adam Armour. Drack's first appearance came in a 1–1 draw against FC Naples the following day, with Drack having a goal disallowed.

== Personal life ==
Josh was born to a Chilean father and a Japanese mother.

Due to his descent, he is eligible to play for United States, Chile or Japan.
