= Brandon Téllez =

Mexican footballer (born 2005)

Personal information
- Full name: Brandon Abiud-Téllez Andrade
- Date of birth: 17 February 2005 (age 21)
- Place of birth: Fullerton, California, United States
- Height: 1.78 m (5 ft 10 in)
- Position: Midfielder

Team information
- Current team: Tapatío
- Number: 62

Senior career*
Years	Team	Apps	(Gls)
2022–2023	LA Galaxy II	21	(1)
2024–	Tapatío	49	(2)

International career^{‡}
2022–	Mexico U18	3	(0)
2024–	Mexico U20	2	(0)
Medal record
Men's football
Representing Mexico
CONCACAF U-20 Championship
Winner	2024 Mexico
Central American and Caribbean Games
Silver medal – second place	2026 Santo Domingo
- * Club domestic league appearances and goals as of 22 August 2026 ‡ National team caps and goals as of 25 July 2024

Brandon Abiud-Téllez Andrade (born 17 February 2005) is a footballer who plays as a midfielder for Liga de Expansión MX club Tapatío and the Mexico national under-20 team. He came through the academy at La Galaxy and made his USL Championship debut in late 2022 for LA Galaxy II. Born in the United States, he represents Mexico at youth level.

== Career ==
Tellez made his debut in the USL Championship for LA Galaxy II on October 12, 2022, against New Mexico United playing from the start, in Isotopes Park, Albuquerque. On October 26, he was named LA Galaxy academy player of the year.

Tellez was named by English newspaper The Guardian as one of the best players born in 2005 worldwide.

== Style of play ==
Tellez has been said by soccer journalist Jon Arnold to possess the “mentality and physical skills needed to play as a defensive midfielder” but more than that, has developed into a forward-thinking player as well due to his “abilities to turn in tight spaces or pull a trick out of his bag to dribble past defenders”.

== International career ==
In August and September 2022, Tellez was called up to train with the Mexico national under-18 football team. He made his debut on September 25, 2022, against Germany in a friendly match.

== Honours ==
Mexico

- CONCACAF U-20 Championship: 2024
