= Pau Vidal (footballer, born 2002) =

Spanish footballer (born 2002)

Personal information
- Full name: Pau Vidal Molina
- Date of birth: 24 March 2002 (age 24)
- Place of birth: Valencia, Spain
- Position: Winger

Youth career
- Villarreal Youth

Senior career*
Years	Team	Apps	(Gls)
2021–2022	Villarreal C		
2023–2024	Sporting Kansas City II	37	(13)
- * Club domestic league appearances and goals as of January 2, 2025

Pau Vidal Molina (born 24 March 2002) is a Spanish footballer who plays as a striker.

== Early life ==
Molina attended Jaume I University in Spain.

== Career ==
Molina played for American side Sporting Kansas City II. His contract expired following the 2024 MLS Next Pro season.

== Style of play ==
Molina mainly operates as a striker and has been described as "physically powerful, versatile given his good handling of the ball with both legs".

== Personal life ==
Vidal is a native of Valencia, Spain.
