= Gino Vivi =

Costa Rican footballer (born 2000)

Personal information
- Full name: Gino Vivi Quesada
- Date of birth: 20 December 2000 (age 25)
- Place of birth: San José, Costa Rica
- Height: 1.72 m (5 ft 8 in)
- Position: Midfielder

Team information
- Current team: Tampa Bay Rowdies (on loan from LA Galaxy)
- Number: 11

Youth career
- –2019: Deportivo Saprissa

College career
Years	Team	Apps	(Gls)
2019–2021	UCF Knights	61	(19)

Senior career*
Years	Team	Apps	(Gls)
2023–	LA Galaxy	3	(0)
2023–2025	LA Galaxy II	32	(10)
2024–2025	→ Deportivo Saprissa (loan)	31	(2)
2026–	→ Tampa Bay Rowdies (loan)	5	(1)
- * Club domestic league appearances and goals as of 00:30, 26 October 2026 (UTC)

Gino Vivi Quesada (born 20 December 2000) is a Costa Rican professional footballer who plays for Tampa Bay Rowdies on loan from the MLS side LA Galaxy.

== Early life ==
Vivi was born in San José, Costa Rica. He is of Italian descent through his paternal family. He attended highschool at the Centro de Formación Integral Saprissa.

== Career ==
Vivi played football with Deportivo Saprissa at U-17 and U-20s level. He played collegiately for the University of Central Florida. In 2022 he was named to the American Athletic Conference All-Conference Second Team. In total he scored 19 goals and was credited with 23 assists in 61 games, including 57 starts, for the Central Florida Knights between 2019 and 2022.

=== LA Galaxy ===
He was signed by LA Galaxy in the 2023 MLS SuperDraft. He signed a one-year professional contract with the club in April 2023, with the possibility of it extending to 2027. He made his MLS debut on 7 May 2023, appearing as a substitute against Colorado Rapids. He made his first start for the side in the U.S. Open Cup against Seattle Sounders FC on May 11, 2023.

In July 2024, he joined Costa Rican side Deportivo Saprissa on loan for the rest of the season.

In February 2026, USL Championship side Tampa Bay Rowdies announced they had acquired Vivi on loan for the 2026 season.

== Honours ==
LA Galaxy

- MLS Cup: 2024
