= José António Serrano =

Portuguese anatomist (1851–1904)

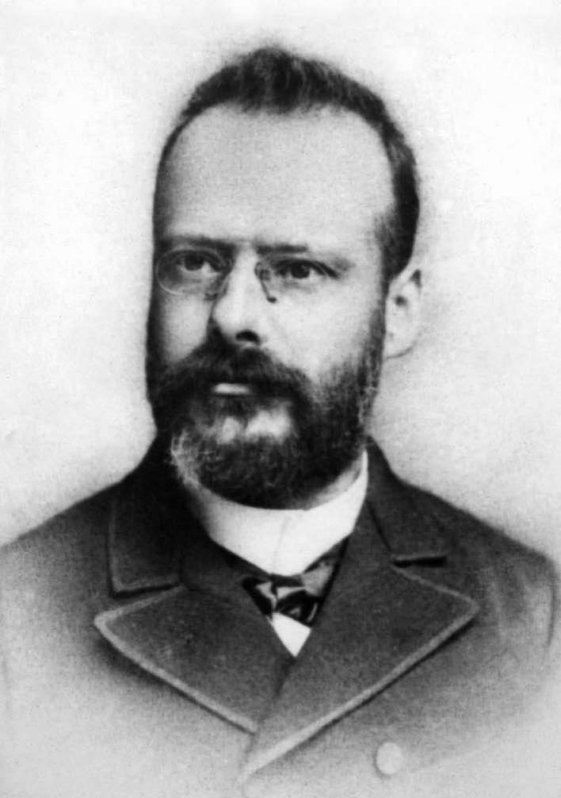
- Born: José António Serrano; 6 October 1851; Castelo de Vide, Portalegre, Portugal
- Died: 7 December 1904 (aged 53); São José, Lisbon, Portugal
- Occupations: Physician and professor

José António Serrano (6 October 1851 – 7 December 1904) was a Portuguese physician and anatomist. Serrano is particularly noted for his osteological treatise Tratado de Osteologia Humana (published in two volumes, in 1895 and 1897; awarded the prestigious Royal Academy of Sciences King Louis Award), and for his advances in surgery in Portugal: while a distinguished surgeon in Saint Joseph's Hospital in Lisbon, he was an early follower of Lister's aseptic technique, and the first in the country to perform a laparotomic histerectomy.

In the summer of 1890, Serrano and Bettencourt Rodrigues pioneered the treatment of endocrine disorders by subcutaneously grafting the thyroid gland of a sheep to treat myxedema and subsequently proposing hypodermic injections of thyroid extract to achieve the same result; their findings were overshadowed by George R. Murray's later paper published in the more accessible British Medical Journal.
