= Cameron Dunbar =

American soccer player (born 2002)

Personal information
- Full name: Cameron Gatlin Dunbar
- Date of birth: October 22, 2002 (age 24)
- Place of birth: Carson, California, United States
- Height: 5 ft 4 in (1.63 m)
- Position: Winger

Team information
- Current team: Atlanta United 2
- Number: 70

Youth career
- 2015–2017: Albion SC
- 2017–2020: LA Galaxy

Senior career*
| Years | Team | Apps | (Gls) |
| 2020–2022 | LA Galaxy | 18 | (0) |
| 2020–2022 | LA Galaxy II | 48 | (15) |
| 2023 | Minnesota United | 3 | (0) |
| 2023 | Minnesota United 2 | 9 | (0) |
| 2023 | → Orange County SC (loan) | 5 | (0) |
| 2024–2025 | Orange County SC | 53 | (3) |
| 2026– | Atlanta United 2 | 28 | (9) |
| 2026– | Atlanta United | 1 | (0) |
- * Club domestic league appearances and goals as of September 27, 2026

Cameron Gatlin Dunbar (born October 22, 2002) is an American professional soccer player who plays for Atlanta United 2 in MLS Next Pro.

== Career ==
Dunbar spent time with the academy sides for Albion SC and LA Galaxy, before signing as a homegrown player with MLS side LA Galaxy on February 20, 2020. He made his professional debut on March 8, 2020, for LA Galaxy's USL Championship side, starting and scoring in a 5–1 win over Rio Grande Valley FC. Dunbar made his Major League Soccer debut in the MLS is Back tournament against the Portland Timbers. On November 7, 2022, Minnesota United FC announced they had acquired Dunbar as a homegrown player in exchange for a third round pick in the 2023 MLS SuperDraft and $75,000 General Allocation Money.

On August 15, 2023, Minnesota loaned Dunbar to Orange County SC for the remainder of the 2023 USL Championship season.
