= Guillermo Barros Schelotto =

Argentine footballer and manager

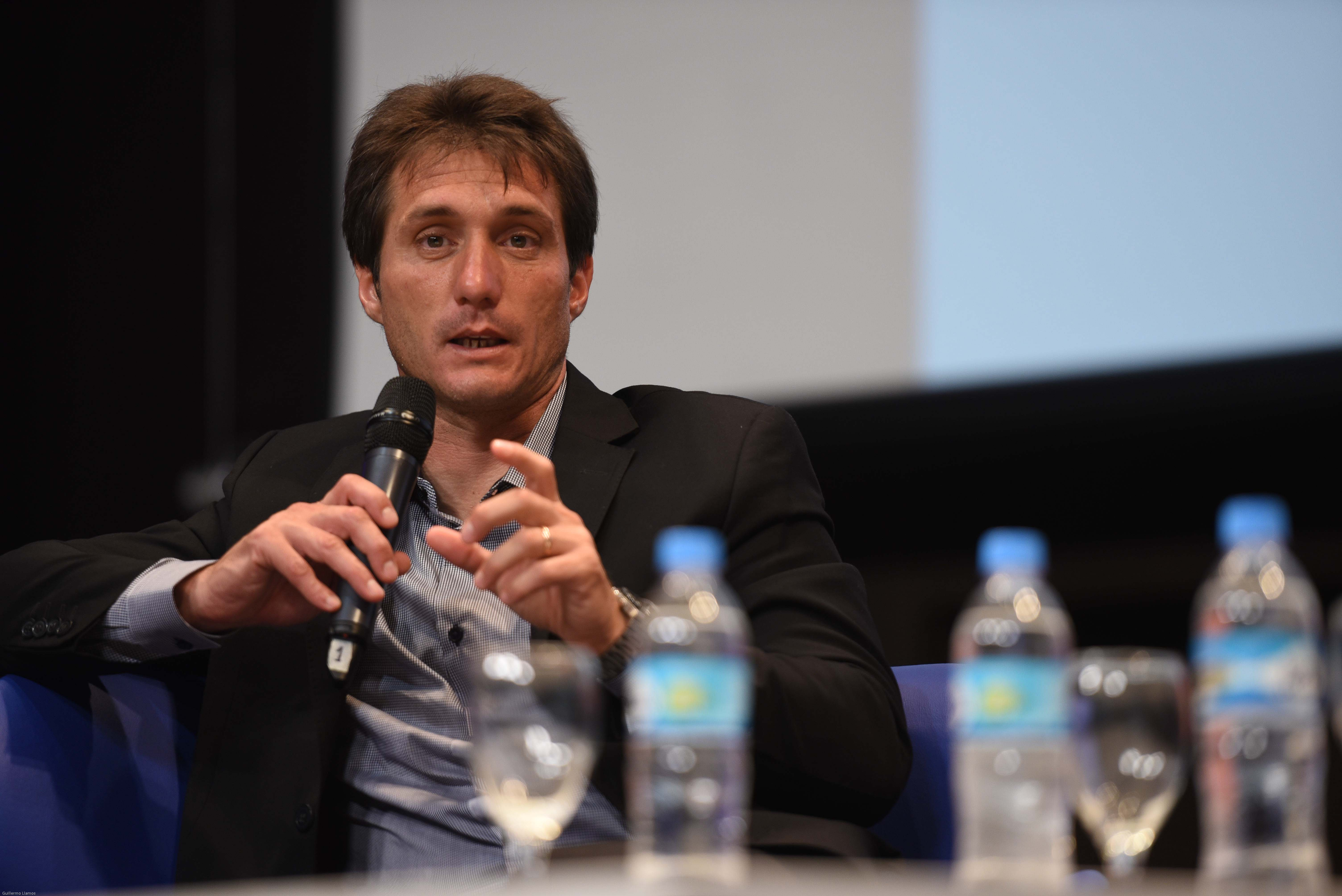
- Guillermo during a master lecture in 2014.

Personal information
- Full name: Guillermo Barros Schelotto
- Date of birth: 4 May 1973 (age 53)
- Place of birth: La Plata, Argentina
- Height: 1.71 m (5 ft 7 in)
- Positions: Forward; attacking midfielder; winger

Team information
- Current team: Vélez Sarsfield (manager)

Youth career
- –1985: For Ever La Plata
- 1985–1991: Gimnasia La Plata

Senior career*
Years	Team	Apps	(Gls)
1991–1997	Gimnasia La Plata	184	(49)
1997–2007	Boca Juniors	300	(86)
2007–2010	Columbus Crew	102	(33)
2011	Gimnasia La Plata	20	(3)
Total		526	(145)

International career
1994–1995	Argentina U-23	6	(3)
1995–1999	Argentina	10	(0)

Managerial career
- 2012–2015: Lanús
- 2016: Palermo
- 2016–2018: Boca Juniors
- 2019–2020: LA Galaxy
- 2021–2023: Paraguay
- 2025–: Vélez Sarsfield
Medal record
Representing Argentina
Men's football
Pan American Games
Gold medal – first place	1995 Mar del Plata	Team competition
- * Club domestic league appearances and goals

Guillermo Barros Schelotto (Spanish pronunciation: [ɡiˈʎeɾmo ˈβaros eskeˈloto]; born 4 May 1973) is an Argentine football manager and former player who played as a forward. He is the current manager of Vélez Sarsfield.

Barros Schelotto played 16 years of his professional career in the Argentine Primera División (six with Gimnasia La Plata and ten with Boca Juniors). With these two teams, he won a total 17 official titles (one with Gimnasia and 16 with Boca). In 2007, Barros Schelotto left Boca Juniors for Columbus Crew in Major League Soccer, his first move outside his native country. The forward won one league championship and two Supporters' Shields with Columbus, as well as two individual awards, before moving back to Gimnasia La Plata in 2011.

== Playing career ==
=== Club ===
==== Argentina ====
Born with a twin brother, Gustavo, Barros Schelotto was hence nicknamed El Mellizo ("the twin"). He started playing professionally at the end of 1991 with his hometown team Gimnasia La Plata, where he scored 45 goals in 181 matches in five seasons and in 1993 won the AFA Centenario Cup. On 14 September 1997, he transferred to Primera División Argentina powerhouse Boca Juniors, for whom he played for almost ten years. He was considered an idol by Boca fans and in his later years at the club showed his experience whenever he stepped on the pitch. Barros Schelotto remains one of Boca's top scorers in international matches with 25 goals, with just one goal behind former teammate Martín Palermo.

In 1996, he was offered to play for River Plate, but after club icon Enzo Francescoli was not happy with the potential signing, the deal collapsed. In mid-1997, Boca Juniors showed interest for him and his brother Gustavo. It was like that that Barros Schelotto twins arrived to Boca teaming up to a former rival: Martín Palermo, Gimnasia's archrival Estudiantes former player. The three of them were repeatedly recommended to Boca by Diego Maradona, who was playing his last season for the Buenos Aires team, retiring on October the same year. Once in Boca, he made his debut as a substitute for Claudio Caniggia, scoring against Newell's Old Boys in a 2–1 victory.

With Carlos Bianchi as Boca Juniors' coach, Barros Schelotto got his traditional 7 shirt and kept it until 2006–07 season. He and former rival Martin Palermo became a successful attacking duo, who highly contributed in the 1998–99 title-winning season. He missed the 2001 and 2003 clubs international achievements due to injuries. In 2003, he was a key piece in the winning Copa Libertadores side, with his peak performance at the Round of 16 match against Brazilian team Paysandú, where he scored a hat-trick and assisted Marcelo Delgado's goal. In the second half of 2003, he again suffered from injuries and could only play for 46 minutes in the Copa Intercontinental winning match against AC Milan, when he replaced Carlos Tevez. In the 2004 Copa Libertadores, he was out injured while training just hours before the second leg of the finals in Manizales, Colombia that Boca would end up losing via penalti kicks against Once Caldas. With Alfio Basile as Boca coach, his participation in the first team was gradually lowering. He even was out of some first team matches and had to play for the second team to maintain his performance level. He scored 87 goals in 302 games for Boca Juniors.

==== United States ====
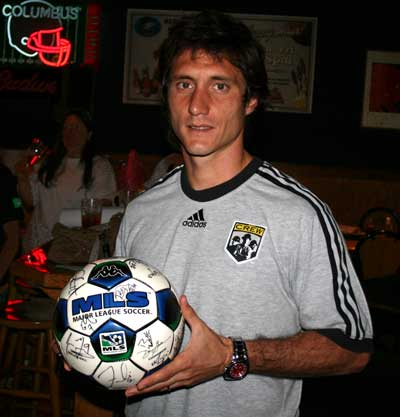
Barros Schelotto in 2007 at a Columbus Crew event

Close to the end of his contract with Boca in 2007, it was rumored that he would leave the club to join a team where he would get more playing time. On 19 April 2007 he announced he would sign a two-year contract with Major League Soccer's Columbus Crew.

Barros Schelotto made his debut in the United States on 5 May, as a 75th-minute replacement, as the Crew lost the match against Kansas City Wizards 1–0. On 12 May 2007 he made his home debut in a game against Chivas USA. The game was tied 1–1, and Schelotto had the assist for the Crew goal. Barros Schelotto quickly became a team leader and fan favorite in Columbus, helping to turn their season around. In the 2007 season he played as an attacking midfielder and led the team with 11 assists, also adding 5 goals, in 22 games.

Barros Schelotto had a strong MLS season in 2008, being chosen Player of the Week four times, Player of the Month once, and recording 19 assists and 7 goals during the regular season. He was named as the Major League Soccer MVP on 20 November 2008. Barros Schelotto capped off his 2008 MLS campaign with an MVP performance in the 2008 MLS Cup, which Columbus won 3–1 against the New York Red Bulls at the Home Depot Center on 23 November 2008, behind Barros Schelotto's three assists. For his performance in the 2008 MLS season, in which he displayed his leadership, vision, passing, scoring and positioning, Barros Schelotto was named Sports Illustrated's Sportsman of the Year. He became the Crew's first ever Designated Player on 2 December 2008.

“The world seemingly slows down for him and he sees the ball that nobody was looking for. In tight spaces, people tend to rush, but Guillermo slowed down. Everything became clearer for him, whereas for everyone else it would become more hectic. That's the difference between superstars and the rest of us.”

— Alejandro Moreno, Columbus Crew teammate

During the 2009 season, Barros Schelotto transitioned to a more advanced role as a second striker—scoring 12 goals while assisting just three times in 24 games.

On 16 November 2010, Barros Schelotto's option was not picked up by the team, along with several other veterans of the club, effectively ending his career in Columbus. Barros Schelotto elected to participate in the 2010 MLS Re-Entry Draft and became a free agent in Major League Soccer when he was not selected in the Re-Entry draft, while leaving Columbus as a club legend.

==== Return to Argentina ====
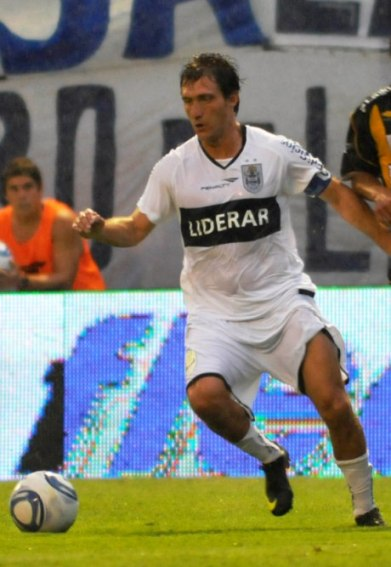
Barros Schelotto playing for Gimnasia y Esgrima in 2011

Barros Schelotto had decided to retire but, on 13 January 2011, he went back on that decision and decided to see out his career with his childhood club Gimnasia La Plata. He returned 14 years after leaving the club in 1997 to join Boca Juniors. Barros Schelotto declined to accept a wage from the club and as such he was contracted unpaid, "ad honorem".

Barros Schelotto's spell at the club lasted six months. In that time, he played 17 matches, primarily as a winger, and scored three goals. His last goal came against Boca Juniors, this was not only his last goal for Gimnasia but also his 110th goal in the Primera Division. As a result of his contributions to the club and his playing abilities, Barros Schelotto is revered by the fans as an idol.

=== International ===
Barros Schelotto obtained ten senior caps for the Argentina national football team between 1995 and 1999, and also won the gold medal in the under-23 Panamerican Games in 1995. For the Argentine youth teams, he scored three goals in six matches. Two of them happened in the single edition of Copa de las Américas Sub-23, in February 1994.

In his final cap for the senior team, in a friendly match against Colombia, he entered as a substitute player and got injured in the last minute. He could get recovered by 2000 and win 2000 Copa Libertadores and 2000 Intercontinental Cup, but without the same major role of previous or subsequent titles. After two years of absence, he could get a last call in November 2001, but this context and the club's focus on 2001 Intercontinental Cup made Boca refuse it.

== Coaching career ==
Following his retirement in 2011, he and fellow Argentine, Gino Padula, established the SP Soccer Academy in Westerville, Ohio.

=== Lanús ===
In July 2012, Barros Schelotto took his first job as a manager, taking charge of Lanús, replacing former manager Gabriel Schürrer.

=== Palermo ===
On 11 January 2016, Barros Schelotto was named as the new coach of Italian side Palermo after his contract with Lanús had ended. Due to bureaucratic issues related to his appointment as head coach, however, Palermo was forced a few days later to hire Giovanni Tedesco, who already had the required coaching badges, as new "official" head coach, with Schelotto working alongside him and sitting on the bench during league games as "team manager". On 10 February 2016, Palermo confirmed Schelotto's resignation from his role at the club after UEFA refused to hand him a coaching badge.

=== Boca Juniors ===
On 1 March 2016, Barros Schelotto signed with his former club Boca Juniors.

With Barros Schelotto at the helm, Boca reached the semi-finals of the 2016 Copa Libertadores, and won the 2016–17 Argentine Primera División despite many issues, including club legend Carlos Tevez's exit with a multi-million-dollar deal to Shanghai Shenhua. Barros Schelotto's Boca also won the 2017–18 Argentine Primera División.

Despite the back-to-back league titles, the club lost the 2018 Copa Libertadores finals against rivals River Plate, and a few days later Boca Juniors president Daniel Angelici decided not to extend his contract.

=== LA Galaxy ===
On 2 January 2019, MLS side LA Galaxy named Barros Schelotto as their new head coach. On 29 October 2020, Barros Schelotto was relieved of his duties as head coach.

=== Paraguay national team ===
On 20 October 2021, the Paraguayan Football Association named Barros Schelotto as the new manager of the Paraguay national football team. On 16 September 2023, Barros Schelotto was relieved of his duties as manager, four days after a 1–0 loss in a South America's World Cup qualifying match against Venezuela.

=== Vélez Sarsfield ===
On March 18, 2025, he was named head coach of Vélez Sarsfield.

== Personal life ==
Barros Schelotto's twin brother, Gustavo, was a teammate of his at Gimnasia La Plata, and also briefly at Boca Juniors. Since 2012, they work together with Guillermo as head coach and Gustavo as assistant coach. Barros Schelotto and his wife, Matilde, have 4 young sons, Máximo, Nicolás, and Santiago, and Lucas . His nephews Juan, Salvador, and Tomás Cataldi and Bautista Barros Schelotto are footballers. His father, Hugo Barros Schelotto, was one of Gimnasia y Esgrima's presidents in the 1980s.

On 7 July 2013, he was immortalized with a statue located in the Museo de la Pasión Boquense, a venue that also features statues of figures such as Diego Maradona, Juan Román Riquelme, and Martín Palermo.

In 2021, his father become one of the victims of COVID-19 pandemic in Argentina, dying in May 1st, three days before a new birthday of Guillermo and Gustavo.

== Career statistics ==
As of match played 25 October 2026.

Managerial record by team and tenure
Team	Nat	From	To	Record							
Team	Nat	From	To	G	W	D	L	GF	GA	GD	Win %
Lanús	(Argentina)	10 July 2012	10 December 2015	167	75	51	41	221	149	+72	44.91
Palermo	(Italy)	11 January 2016	10 February 2016	4	1	2	1	7	6	+1	25.00
Boca Juniors	(Argentina)	1 March 2016	31 December 2018	117	63	31	23	204	98	+106	53.85
LA Galaxy	(United States)	2 January 2019	29 October 2020	62	23	8	31	97	123	−26	37.10
Paraguay	(Paraguay)	20 October 2021	16 September 2023	17	4	4	9	12	22	−10	23.53
Vélez Sarsfield	(Argentina)	18 March 2025	present	70	31	22	17	87	57	+30	44.29
Total				437	197	118	122	628	455	+173	45.08

== Honours ==
=== Player ===
Argentina

- Pan American Games: 1995

Gimnasia La Plata

- Copa Centenario de la AFA: 1993

Boca Juniors

- Copa Libertadores: 2000, 2001, 2003, 2007
- Copa Sudamericana: 2004, 2005
- Recopa Sudamericana: 2005, 2006
- Argentine Primera División: 1998 Apertura, 1999 Clausura, 2000 Apertura, 2003 Apertura, 2005 Apertura, 2006 Clausura
- Intercontinental Cup: 2000, 2003

Columbus Crew

- MLS Cup: 2008
- Supporters' Shield: 2008, 2009

Individual

- MLS Player of the Month: July 2007, August 2008, June 2009
- MLS MVP: 2008
- MLS Best XI: 2007, 2008
- MLS top assist provider: 2008
- MLS Cup MVP: 2008
- MLS All-Star: 2007, 2008, 2009, 2010

=== Manager ===
Lanús

- Copa Sudamericana: 2013

Boca Juniors

- Argentine Primera División: 2016–17, 2017–18

Vélez Sarsfield

- Supercopa Argentina: 2024
- Supercopa Internacional: 2024
