= Gustavo Barros Schelotto =

Argentine footballer (born 1973)

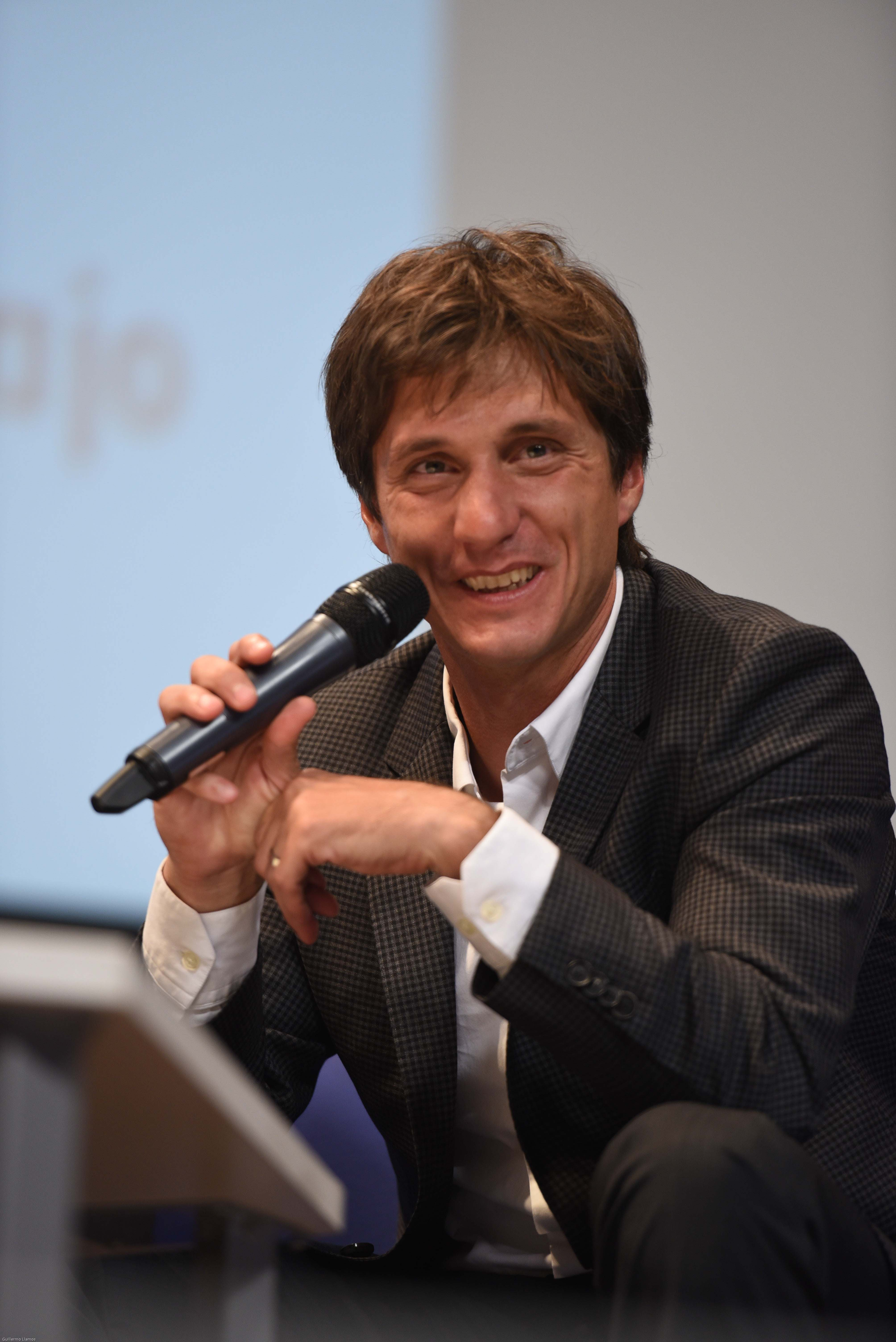
- Barros Schelotto in 2014

Personal information
- Full name: Gustavo Barros Schelotto
- Date of birth: 4 May 1973 (age 53)
- Place of birth: La Plata, Argentina
- Height: 1.71 m (5 ft 7 in)
- Position: Midfielder

Team information
- Current team: Paraguay (assistant)

Senior career*
Years	Team	Apps	(Gls)
1992–1997	Gimnasia Esgrima La Plata	135	(9)
1997	Boca Juniors	5	(0)
1998	Unión Santa Fe	13	(0)
1998–2000	Boca Juniors	45	(4)
2001	Villarreal	7	(0)
2001–2002	Racing Club	30	(1)
2002–2004	Rosario Central	41	(4)
2004	Gimnasia Esgrima La Plata	9	(0)
2005	Alianza Lima	6	(0)
2006–2007	Puerto Rico Islanders	23	(3)

International career
1996	Argentina U-23		

Managerial career
- 2009: Olimpia (assistant)
- 2010–2011: Libertad (assistant)
- 2011–2012: Peñarol (assistant)
- 2012–2015: Lanús (assistant)
- 2016–2018: Boca Juniors (assistant)
- 2019–2020: LA Galaxy (assistant)
- 2021–2023: Paraguay (assistant)
- * Club domestic league appearances and goals

Gustavo Barros Schelotto (born 4 May 1973) is an Argentine former professional footballer who played as a midfielder.

== Playing career ==
Born in La Plata, Barros Schelotto came through the youth system at Club de Gimnasia y Esgrima La Plata with his twin brother Guillermo. In Argentine Championship, Gustavo made his debut against Club Atlético Vélez Sársfield on 4 October 1992, months later his first matches with the main team, at the 1992 Copa CONMEBOL.

Both brothers helped the team to win the Copa Centenario (the AFA Centenary Cup) in 1993, as well in reaching two runner up campaigns in First Division, on 1995 Clausura and 1996 Clausura. By the beginning of 1996, Gustavo was also called in some matches of Argentina U-23, in friendlies prior to 1996 CONMEBOL Pre-Olympic Tournament, although he did not took part in it.

In 1997, both Barros Schelotto brothers signed for Argentine club Boca Juniors. He was part of three national leagues winning squads and helped the team to win the 2000 Libertadores Cup later that year. Barros Schelotto played 65 games for Boca in all competitions, scoring 6 goals. Including friendly games, he played 91 games and scored 12. His goals in Friendlies included one in a Superclásico and another one against Villarreal CF.

In January 2001, Barros Schelotto had a small La Liga stint, joining Spanish side Villarreal before returning to Argentina to join Racing Club de Avellaneda where he won the Apertura 2001, the first title of Racing in Argentine league after 35 years. He then went on to play for Rosario Central before returning to Gimnasia de La Plata.

In 2005 Barros Schelotto joined Peruvian outfit Alianza Lima, and in 2006 moved to Puerto Rico Islanders of the USL First Division in the United States where he played 23 games and scored 3 goals.

== Coaching career ==
In March 2009, Barros Schelotto became the assistant manager of Gregorio Pérez at Club Olimpia. He left the position together with Pérez in July. Pérez and Barros Schelotto continued together the next year, where they joined Club Libertad in April 2010 before leaving in July 2011. In September 2011 they joined Peñarol still with Barros Schelotto as Pérez' assistant.

In July 2012, Barros Schelotto was appointed as the assistant manager of Club Atlético Lanús in Argentine alongside his twin brother Guillermo Barros Schelotto who became the manager. The two brothers finished the 2015 season before leaving to seek a fresh challenge elsewhere. In March 2016, the two twin brothers joined Boca Juniors, with Guillermo as the manager and Gustavo as the assistant manager. They left the club again at the end of the 2018 season.

On 9 January 2019, Gustavo and his twin brother joined LA Galaxy, again with Gustavo as the assistant manager under Guillermo. They were relieved of their duties on 29 October 2020, due to Galaxy's poor performance near the latter part of the season.

== Personal life ==
Barros Schelotto is the twin brother of Guillermo Barros Schelotto. Their father, Hugo Barros Schelotto, was one of Gimnasia y Esgrima's presidents in the 1980s, while his nephews Juan, Salvador & Tomás Cataldi and Bautista Barros Schelotto are footballers.

== Honours ==
Gimnasia de La Plata

- Copa Centenario: 1993

Boca Juniors

- Argentine Primera División: Apertura 1998, Clausura 1999, Apertura 2000
- Copa Libertadores: 2000
- Intercontinental Cup: 2000

Racing Club

- Argentine Primera División: Apertura 2001
