= Alex Alcalá =

Mexican footballer (born 2005)

Personal information
- Full name: Alejandro Alcalá Solorio
- Date of birth: 20 October 2005 (age 21)
- Place of birth: Stockton, California, United States
- Height: 1.68 m (5 ft 6 in)
- Position: Midfielder

Team information
- Current team: Querétaro
- Number: 20

Youth career
- Monarcas Academy
- Stockton TLJ FC Rebels
- 2020–2021: LA Galaxy

Senior career*
Years	Team	Apps	(Gls)
2021–2023	LA Galaxy II	22	(3)
2024–2025	Manchester City	0	(0)
2026–	Querétaro	9	(0)

International career^{‡}
- Mexico U15
2019	Mexico U16		
2022–	Mexico U18	1	(0)
- * Club domestic league appearances and goals as of 8 November 2026 ‡ National team caps and goals as of 15 October 2022

Alejandro "Alex" Alcalá Solorio (born 20 October 2005) is a professional footballer who plays as a midfielder for Liga MX club Querétaro. Born in the United States, he is a youth international for Mexico.

== Club career ==
=== Early career ===
Born in Stockton, California, Alcalá started his career with local side Stockton TLJ FC Rebels. He spent time training with Manchester City, Barcelona and Pachuca before joining the LA Galaxy academy in 2020. He signed professional terms with the Galaxy in February 2021.

In July 2021, it was announced that English side Manchester City have a pre-arrangement with La Galaxy to have first refusal to Alcalá's buyout clause once he turns 18.

In July 2022, having not yet made his debut for LA Galaxy II, he was named to the MLS Next All-Star Game for 2022.

=== Manchester City ===
On 11 January 2024, Alcalá signed a five-year deal with Manchester City's Elite Development Squad.

=== Querétaro ===
In January 2026, Alcalá joined Mexican club Querétaro.

== International career ==
Eligible to represent both Mexico and the United States at international level, Alcalá has been capped by Mexico at various youth level.

== Style of play ==
A skilful and fast midfielder, Alcalá models his play style on Brazilian legend Ronaldinho, and states that he admires the playing style of Jesús Manuel Corona. He has been referred to as the "Mexican Messi", due to his stature and playing style being similar to that of Argentine legend Lionel Messi. However, Alcalá says that he does not like this comparison, and wants to make his own impact on the game.

== Honours ==
Manchester City U21

- Premier League 2: 2024–25

Mexico U16

- Torneo Delle Nazioni: 2019
- Trinidad and Tobago Tournament: 2019

Individual

- MLS Next All-Star: 2022
