= Aaron Bibout =

Cameroonian footballer

Personal information
- Full name: Aaron Le Forestier Banind Bibout
- Date of birth: 3 September 2004 (age 22)
- Place of birth: Yaoundé, Cameroon
- Height: 1.94 m (6 ft 4 in)
- Position: Forward

Team information
- Current team: Genk
- Number: 23

Youth career
- Kadji Sports Academy
- Los Angeles FC
- LA Galaxy

Senior career*
Years	Team	Apps	(Gls)
2023–2025	Ventura County FC	50	(23)
2023–2025	LA Galaxy	2	(0)
2023	→ Detroit City (loan)	5	(0)
2024	→ FC Tulsa (loan)	13	(4)
2025	Västerås SK	12	(6)
2025–	Genk	30	(9)
2025–2026	Jong Genk	16	(10)

International career
2021	Cameroon U17		
- * Club domestic league appearances and goals as of 22:00, 25 October 2026 (UTC)

Aaron Le Forestier Banind Bibout (born 3 September 2004) is a Cameroonian professional footballer who currently plays as a forward for Belgian club KRC Genk.

== Club career ==
On 23 March 2023, it was announced that Bibout had joined LA Galaxy II (later re-branded as Ventura County FC) ahead of their first season as part of the MLS Next Pro having previously played as part of the Kadji Sports Academy in Cameroon, as well as the Los Angeles FC SoCal academy, and the LA Galaxy academy in the United Premier Soccer League. After a successful start to the MLS Next Pro season, where Bibout netted eight goals in 13 appearances, he joined the LA Galaxy's Major League Soccer roster on 21 June 2023, after Javier Hernández suffered a season-ending injury. He signed permanently with LA Galaxy's MLS roster on 23 February 2024.

On 25 March 2025, Bibout was transferred to Swedish Superettan side Västerås SK for an undisclosed fee.

On 24 July 2025, Bibout joined Belgian Pro League side KRC Genk, signing a four-year contract.

== International career ==
Bibout had played as part of the Cameroon under-17 side in 2021.

== Career statistics ==
As of match played 25 October 2026

Appearances and goals by club, season and competition
Club	Season	League			National cup		Continental		Other		Total	
Club	Season	Division	Apps	Goals	Apps	Goals	Apps	Goals	Apps	Goals	Apps	Goals
Ventura County FC	2023	MLS Next Pro	27	14	—		—		—		27	14
Ventura County FC	2024	MLS Next Pro	21	8	2	0	—		—		23	8
Ventura County FC	2025	MLS Next Pro	2	1	1	3	—		—		3	4
Ventura County FC	Total		50	23	3	3	—		—		53	26
LA Galaxy	2023	MLS	2	0	—		—		—		2	0
Detroit City (loan)	2023	USL Championship	5	0	—		—		—		5	0
FC Tulsa (loan)	2024	USL Championship	13	4	—		—		—		13	4
Västerås SK	2025	Superettan	12	6	—		—		—		12	6
Genk	2025–26	Belgian Pro League	18	5	1	0	6 (Note: Appearances in UEFA Europa League)	0	—		25	5
Genk	2026–27	Belgian Pro League	9	3	1	0	—		—		10	3
Genk	Total		27	8	2	0	6	0	—		35	8
Jong Genk	2025–26	Challenger Pro League	16	10	—		—		—		16	10
Career total			125	51	5	3	6	0	0	0	136	54
