= Jesús Vázquez (footballer, born 1995) =

American soccer player

Personal information
- Full name: Jesús Antonio Vázquez Ocampo
- Date of birth: March 22, 1995 (age 31)
- Place of birth: San Luis Obispo, California, United States
- Height: 6 ft 0 in (1.83 m)
- Position: Center-back

Youth career
- 2014–2016: Tigres UANL
- 2016–2017: Santos Laguna

Senior career*
| Years | Team | Apps | (Gls) |
| 2017–2019 | Tigres UANL | 0 | (0) |
| 2017–2018 | → Atlante (loan) | 5 | (0) |
| 2019 | → Cancún (loan) | 14 | (0) |
| 2019–2021 | Atlante | 1 | (0) |
| 2020–2021 | LA Galaxy II | 41 | (2) |
| 2022 | Rio Grande Valley FC | 16 | (1) |
| 2022 | → Indy Eleven (loan) | 3 | (0) |
| 2022–2023 | Indy Eleven | 32 | (1) |
- * Club domestic league appearances and goals as of November 30, 2023

Jesús Antonio Vázquez Ocampo (born March 22, 1995) is an American professional soccer player who last played as a center-back for Indy Eleven in the USL Championship.

== Club career ==
Vázquez was loaned to Indy Eleven on July 25, 2022, for the remainder of the 2022 USL Championship season. Indy sent midfielder Jonas Fjeldberg in return. On August 18, Indy Eleven opted to make his deal at the club permanent and signed him to a new contract.

Indy Eleven released Vázquez following the conclusion of the 2023 USL Championship season on November 30, 2023. Vázquez made 32 league appearances for the Indianapolis-based club, scoring one goal.
