= José Serrano (footballer, born 2002) =

Venezuelan footballer

Personal information
- Full name: José David Serrano Suárez
- Date of birth: 17 October 2002 (age 24)
- Place of birth: Barinas, Venezuela
- Height: 1.82 m (6 ft 0 in)
- Position: Forward

Youth career
- Zamora

Senior career*
| Years | Team | Apps | (Gls) |
| 2018–2022 | Zamora | 30 | (4) |
| 2022–2023 | Tlaxcala | 10 | (2) |
| 2023 | → San Jose Earth. II (loan) | 21 | (1) |

International career
| 2017 | Venezuela U-15 | | |
| 2018 | Venezuela U-17 | | |
- * Club domestic league appearances and goals as of 11:04, 15 October 2023 (UTC)

José David Serrano Suárez (born 17 October 2002) is a Venezuelan footballer who plays as a forward.

== Career ==
=== Club career ===
Serrano is a product of Zamora FC. In February 2018, Serrano signed a new deal with Zamora. Less than two weeks after he turned 16 years old, Serrano got his official debut for Zamora in the Venezuelan Primera División against Aragua FC on 28 October 2018. Serrano started on the bench, before coming in as a substitute for Darwin Matheus in the 60th minute. His debut was one out of two league games, that he played for Zamora in 2018.

In 2019, he made no appearances in the league, however, one appearance in the Copa Venezuela. In 2020, 18-year old Serrano began playing more regularly. He played 14 league games and scored three goals for Zamora.

In June 2022, Serrano moved to Mexican Liga de Expansión MX side Tlaxcala. On 18 May 2023 it was confirmed, that Serrano had joined American side San Jose Earthquakes, where he would play for the club's reserve team on loan for the rest of 2023. The deal also included a purchase option. After 1 goal and 4 assists in 21 games, the American club confirmed in November 2023 that they would not trigger the buyout clause and that Serrano would return to Tlaxcala.

== International career ==
In 2017, Serrano was summoned to the Venezuelan U-15 team ahead of the 2017 South American U-15 Championship. A year later, in 2018, he was also a part of the Venezuelan U-17 national team.
