= Axel Picazo =

Professional footballer (born 2001)

Personal information
- Date of birth: April 5, 2001 (age 25)
- Place of birth: Mexico City, Mexico
- Height: 5 ft 10 in (1.78 m)
- Position: Midfielder

Youth career
- América
- 2015–2016: Lonestar SC
- 2016–2020: Philadelphia Union

Senior career*
Years	Team	Apps	(Gls)
2019–2020	Philadelphia Union II	35	(3)
2021–2023	Ventura County FC	71	(5)
2024	Huntsville City FC	11	(2)

International career
2018	United States U18	2	(0)
- * Club domestic league appearances and goals as of December 13, 2023

Axel Picazo (born April 5, 2001) is a professional footballer who plays as a midfielder. Born in Mexico, he has previously represented the United States under-18 national team.

== Career ==
Picazo appeared as an amateur player for USL Championship side Bethlehem Steel during their 2019 season, as well as being part of the Philadelphia Union academy. In March 2020, Picazo joined Ventura County FC.
