= Rémi Cabral =

French footballer (born 1999)

Personal information
- Date of birth: 10 July 1999 (age 27)
- Place of birth: Paris, France
- Height: 1.76 m (5 ft 9 in)
- Positions: Attacking midfielder; forward

Team information
- Current team: FC Tulsa
- Number: 7

Youth career
- 2012–2017: Paris Saint-Germain

Senior career*
Years	Team	Apps	(Gls)
2017	Paris Saint-Germain B	0	(0)
2017–2018	Metz B	23	(3)
2019–2021	Valenciennes II	7	(2)
2021–2022	LA Galaxy II	56	(8)
2023	Colorado Rapids 2	22	(19)
2023–2024	Colorado Rapids	1	(0)
2024	→ Phoenix Rising (loan)	22	(7)
2025	Phoenix Rising	19	(6)
2026–	FC Tulsa	24	(5)
- * Club domestic league appearances and goals as of 16:56, 11 November 2026 (UTC)

Rémi Cabral (born 10 July 1999) is a French professional footballer who plays as a midfielder for FC Tulsa in the USL Championship.

== Career ==
Cabral was a part of the Paris Saint-Germain youth system before signing with FC Metz in France's Ligue 1 in June 2017, where he made 23 appearances for the club's B team. In 2019, Cabral joined Valenciennes FC.

On 27 April 2021, Cabral moved to the United States to join USL Championship side LA Galaxy II. On 9 February 2023, Cabral again followed his brother, Kevin, joining Colorado Rapids 2 in the MLS Next Pro. On 30 May 2023, Cabral signed a short-term deal to allow him to feature with Colorado Rapids in Major League Soccer. Cabral won the Golden Boot for the 2023 MLS Next Pro season, scoring 13 goals in 17 matches.

On 24 January 2024, Cabral was signed to the Colorado Rapids first team and loaned to Phoenix Rising of the USL Championship. The Rapids maintain the right to recall Cabral at any point during the 2024 season. Cabral's contract option was declined by Colorado following their 2024 season.

Cabral signed a permanent deal with Phoenix Rising on 13 December 2024.

Cabral moved to USL Championship side FC Tulsa on 28 February 2026.

== Personal ==
Rémi's twin brother, Kévin, plays for Red Star.
