= Ascel Essengue =

Cameroonian footballer (born 2003)

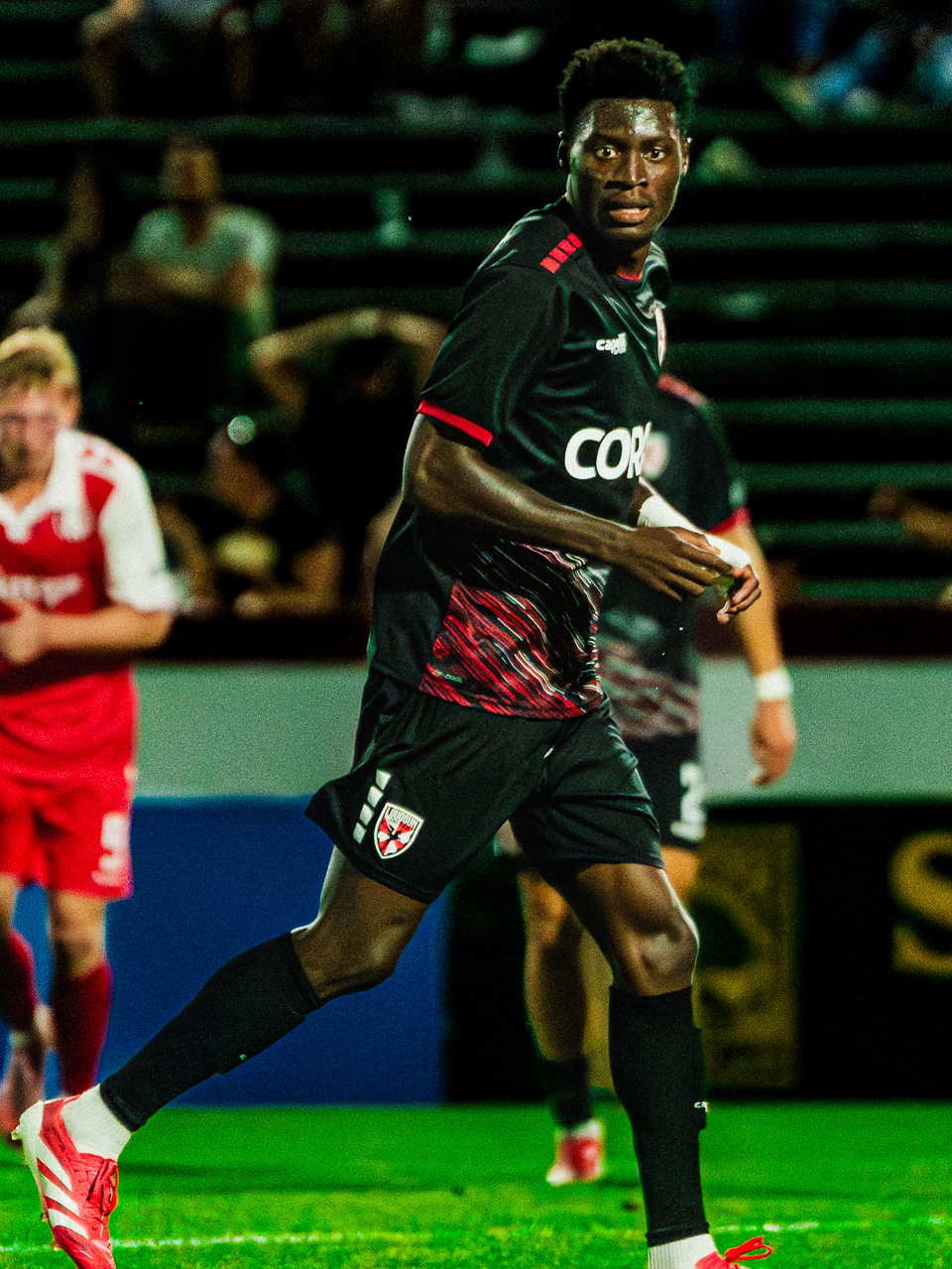
- Essengue on loan to Loudoun United FC in 2026

Personal information
- Full name: Ascel Kevin Essengue
- Date of birth: April 30, 2003 (age 23)
- Place of birth: Yaoundé, Cameroon
- Height: 1.85 m (6 ft 1 in)
- Position: Defensive midfielder

Team information
- Current team: Phoenix Rising on loan from LA Galaxy
- Number: 51

Youth career
- Kadji Sports Academy
- 2017–2021: LA Galaxy

Senior career*
Years	Team	Apps	(Gls)
2021–	Ventura County FC	69	(3)
2025–	LA Galaxy	0	(0)
2025–	→ Phoenix Rising (loan)	22	(1)
2026	→ Loudoun United (loan)	10	(1)
2026–	→ Phoenix Rising (loan)	1	(0)

International career
- Cameroon U16
- * Club domestic league appearances and goals as of 8 September 2026

Ascel Kevin Essengue (born 30 April 2003) is a Cameroonian professional footballer who currently plays for USL Championship club Phoenix Rising FC on loan from LA Galaxy.

== Career ==
Essengue played as part of the LA Galaxy academy. In 2021, Essengue appeared for LA's USL Championship affiliate side LA Galaxy II. He made his first appearance on 17 July 2021, appearing as a 72nd-minute substitute during a 5–0 loss to Phoenix Rising.

In September 2026, Phoenix Rising announced they had signed Essengue on loan from LA Galaxy.
