= Ventura County FC =

MLS Next Pro soccer team

- Full name: Ventura County FC
- Short name: VCFC
- Founded: 2014; 12 years ago as LA Galaxy II
- Stadium: William Rolland Stadium; Thousand Oaks, California
- Capacity: 2,000
- Owner: LA Galaxy (AEG)
- Manager: Matthew Taylor
- League: MLS Next Pro
- 2025: 8th, Western Conference; Playoffs: Conference Quarterfinals
- Website: vcfcpro.com
Home colors	Away colors

Ventura County FC is an American professional soccer team based in the Greater Los Angeles area town of Thousand Oaks in Ventura County, California, United States that plays in MLS Next Pro, the third tier of the United States soccer league system. It is the reserve team of the LA Galaxy and was formerly known as LA Galaxy II from its founding in 2014 until 2024. The team previously played in the USL Championship until the end of the 2022 season.

== History ==
It was announced on January 29, 2014, that the LA Galaxy of Major League Soccer would be fielding their own team in the USL Pro to serve as their reserve team beginning with the 2014 USL Pro season. The Galaxy chose to create their own team in the league instead of affiliating with a current USL Pro team after the two leagues formed a partnership the previous year. The current assistant coach of the senior squad, Curt Onalfo, would become head coach of the reserve squad. The club would play its home matches at Dignity Health Sports Park's Track & Field Stadium, a 1,200-seat stadium near the main stadium, home to the senior club. Onalfo had led the Galaxy's previous reserve squad to two consecutive MLS Reserve League West Division titles. In the process, the LA Galaxy became the first MLS club to own and operate its own USL Pro side.

About forming the reserve team, Galaxy President Chris Klein said, “The creation of LA Galaxy II, through USL PRO, provides the Galaxy with a fully realized, in-house player development program starting with the Under-12 Academy through the LA Galaxy first team. The investment of AEG and the Galaxy for LA Galaxy II will allow us to continue to develop the best players in Southern California while closing the gap between the Galaxy Academy and the LA Galaxy.”

In 2022, Major League Soccer announced that Los Dos would be one of the new MLS Next Pro teams in 2023. In March 2024, the team announced a partial relocation to Thousand Oaks, California and rebranded to its current name of Ventura County FC.

== Stadium ==
The club currently plays at William Roland Stadium on the campus of California Lutheran University in Thousand Oaks, California. The team previously played in the Track & Field Facility at Dignity Health Sports Park in Carson, California Occasional games would be played at the main stadium at Dignity Health Sports Park, which holds 27,000 attendees and is the home of the LA Galaxy first team.

== Club culture ==
=== Rivalries ===
When in USL, LA Galaxy II competed in the 405 Derby against rivals Orange County SC. In 2022 the clubs were in a dispute over which team would play at Championship Soccer Stadium in Irvine, California, Orange County SC's current home stadium, after leaked documents showed the Galaxy organization was attempting to seize full-time usage of the venue.

== Players and staff ==
The squad of VCFC is composed of an unrestricted number of first-team players on loan to the reserve team, players signed by Galaxy II, and LA Galaxy Academy players. Academy players who appear in matches with VCFC retain their college eligibility.

=== Current roster ===
Note: Flags indicate national team as defined under FIFA eligibility rules; some limited exceptions apply. Players may hold more than one non-FIFA nationality.

No.	Pos.	Nation	Player
20	DF	USA	Chris Rindov
31	GK	USA	Brady Scott
41	GK	USA	Sebastian Conlon
45	MF	USA	Vicente Garcia
47	MF	ESP	Arnau Vilamitjana
50	DF	USA	Riley Dalgado
57	FW	USA	Julian Placias
60	DF	USA	Sebastian Hernandez
61	DF	USA	Palmer Bank
64	DF	USA	Jose Magaña
68	MF	GER	Luis Muller
73	DF	USA	Enrique Martinez
74	FW	USA	Daniel Ittycheria
75	FW	USA	Aaron Medina
76	MF	USA	Troy Elgersma

No.	Pos.	Nation	Player
80	DF	CMR	Jeremy Djieze
83	MF	USA	Angel Villatoro
84	FW	USA	Ikenna Chidebe
85	FW	PUR	Edwin Rios Jr
87	MF	USA	Gabriel Arnold
88	DF	USA	Mason Vanney
90	MF	VIE	Brett Phan
91	GK	USA	Will Walker
92	GK	USA	Nathan Enriquez
94	DF	USA	Mateo McLean
95	FW	USA	Eric Preston
96	MF	USA	Christian Vanney

Signed to first team contract with LA Galaxy.
LA Galaxy Academy player.

=== Coaching staff ===
Role	Name	Nation
Head coach	Matthew Taylor	United States
Assistant coach	Alex Yi	United States
Goalkeeping coach	Ian Feuer	United States
Video analyst	Grant Heywood	England
Performance coach	Luke Garcia	Canada

== Team records ==
=== Year-by-year ===
Year	Division	League	Regular season W-T-L	Playoffs	U.S. Open Cup	Avg. attendance	Top scorer	Goals
2014	3	USL	3rd: 15–6–7	Semifinals	3R	597	(United States) Chandler Hoffman	14
2015	3	USL	5th, Western: 14–3–11	Runner-Up	2R	969	(Costa Rica) Ariel Lassiter	11
2016	3	USL	5th, Western: 12–11–7	Conference quarterfinals	Not eligible	1,211	(United States) Jack McBean	15
2017	2	USL	13th, Western: 8–5–19	did not qualify	Not eligible	1,215	(United States) Justin Dhillon (United States) Adrian Vera	6
2018	2	USL	14th, Western: 10–7–17	did not qualify	Not eligible	1,048	(Cuba) Frank López	13
2019	2	USLC	9th, Western: 12–12–10	Play-in round	Not eligible	881	(United States) Ethan Zubak (Netherlands) Kai Koreniuk	9
2020	2	USLC	8th, Western: 8–2–6; 2nd Group B	Conference quarterfinals	Not eligible	N/A	(Sierra Leone) Augustine Williams	13
2021	2	USLC	11th, Western: 11-6-15	did not qualify	Canceled	N/A	(United States) Preston Judd	17
2022	2	USLC	11th, Western: 11-7-16	did not qualify	Not eligible	N/A	(United States) Preston Judd	13
2023	3	MLSNP	14th, Western: 5-6-17	did not qualify	Not eligible	N/A	(Cameroon) Aaron Bibout	14
2024	3	MLSNP	6th, Western: 8-9-11	Conference Quarterfinals	2R	N/A	(Cameroon) Aaron Bibout (United States) Rubén Ramos	8
2025	3	MLSNP	8th, Western: 11-6-11	Conference Quarterfinals	Not eligible	N/A	(United States) Jeorgio Kocevski (Germany) Luis Müller	7

=== Head coaches ===
- Includes USL Regular season, USL Play-offs and Lamar Hunt U.S. Open Cup

All time Ventura County Coaching Stats
Coach	Nationality	Start	End	Games	Win	Loss	Draw	Win %
Curt Onalfo	United States	January 29, 2014	December 13, 2016	95	46	29	20	48.42
Mike Muñoz	United States	January 12, 2017	July 19, 2019	85	23	42	20	27.06
Junior Gonzalez (Interim)	United States	July 19, 2019	January 8, 2020	15	6	5	4	40.00
Junior Gonzalez	United States	January 8, 2020	December 18, 2021	16	8	6	2	50.00
Yoann Damet	France	January 28, 2022	July 1, 2022	18	7	3	8	38.89
Marcelo Sarvas	Brazil	August 2022	2023					
Matthew Taylor	United States	January 22, 2024	present					

== Honors ==
- USL Championship
  - Runners Up : 2015
- Western Conference (Playoffs)
  - Winners : 2015

=== Player honors ===
Year	Player	Country	Position	Honor
2014	Chandler Hoffman	United States	Forward	All-League First Team
2014	André Auras	France	Midfielder	All-League Second Team
2014	Daniel Steres	United States	Defender	All-League Second Team
2015	Daniel Steres	United States	Defender	All-League First Team
2016	Jack McBean	United States	Forward	All-League First Team
2018	Efraín Álvarez	Mexico	Midfielder	Young Player of the Year
2020	Augustine Williams	Sierra Leone	Forward	All-League First Team
