= 2019 LA Galaxy II season =

LA Galaxy II
2019 season
- Head coach: Mike Muñoz (Until July 19); Junior Gonzalez (July 19–)
- Stadium: Dignity Health Sports Park
- USL Championship: Conference: 9th
- Playoffs: Play-In Round
- Top goalscorer: Kai Koreniuk (9 goals)
- Highest home attendance: 1,984 (October 19 vs. El Paso Locomotive FC)
- Lowest home attendance: 535 (July 20 vs. Reno 1868 FC)
- Average home league attendance: 880
- Biggest win: 5–1 (September 28 vs. OKC Energy FC)
- Biggest defeat: 0–5 (March 23 vs. Real Monarchs)
Home colors

The 2019 LA Galaxy II season was the club's sixth season of existence.

== Squad information ==
At the end of the season.

No.	Position	Player	Nation
30	MF	BEN	Don Tchilao
33	DF	USA	Nate Shultz
42	GK	MEX	Abraham Romero
43	MF	USA	Adam Saldana
44	MF	GHA	Geoffrey Acheampong
46	DF	USA	John Requejo
47	MF	MEX	José Hernández
48	FW	SLE	Augustine Williams
49	MF	USA	Adrian Vera
50	MF	MEX	Iván Gutiérrez
51	DF	TAN	Abdalla Haji Shaibu
52	MF	USA	Kai Koreniuk
57	DF	USA	Omar Ontiveros
58	DF	USA	Mauricio Cuevas
62	DF	USA	Nick DePuy
63	DF	USA	Michael Gallagher
67	MF	PAN	Carlos Harvey (on loan from Tauro)
68	FW	LBR	Mohammed Kamara
69	DF	USA	Justin Fiddes
70	MF	USA	Brian Iloski
72	MF	PAN	Ernesto Walker (on loan from Plaza Amador)
75	GK	USA	Eric Lopez

=== Transfers ===
==== Transfers in ====
Pos.	Player	Transferred from	Fee/notes	Date	Source
FW	(Sierra Leone) Augustine Williams	(United States) Portland Timbers 2	Sign.	January 28, 2019	
GK	(Mexico) Abraham Romero	(Mexico) Pachuca	Sign.	January 30, 2019	
MF	(Mexico) José Hernández	(United States) Real Monarchs	Sign.	February 1, 2019	
DF	(United States) Michael Gallagher	(United States) Real Monarchs	Sign.	February 14, 2019	
MF	(Panama) Ernesto Walker	(Panama) Plaza Amador	Loan.	February 21, 2019	
MF	(Panama) Carlos Harvey	(Panama) Tauro	Loan.	March 6, 2019	
MF	(United States) Kai Koreniuk	(Netherlands) AZ Alkmaar	Sign.	March 7, 2019	
MF	(Benin) Don Tchilao		Selected by the LA Galaxy in the 2019 MLS SuperDraft.	March 7, 2019	
DF	(United States) Nick DePuy	(Canada) Montreal Impact	Sign.	March 8, 2019	
DF	(United States) Omar Ontiveros	(United States) Rio Grande Valley FC Toros	Sign.	March 8, 2019	
MF	(United States) Brian Iloski	(Poland) Legia Warsaw	Sign.	April 4, 2019	
DF	(United States) Mauricio Cuevas	(United States) LA Galaxy Academy	Sign.	April 30, 2019	
MF	(Mexico) Iván Gutiérrez	(Mexico) Guadalajara	Sign.	June 3, 2019	
MF	(United States) Adam Saldana	(United States) LA Galaxy Academy	Sign.	June 18, 2019	
FW	(Liberia) Mohammed Kamara	(Germany) SC Paderborn	Sign.	August 2, 2019	
DF	(Tanzania) Abdalla Haji Shaibu	(Czech Republic) MFK Vyškov	Sign.	August 16, 2019	

==== Transfers out ====
Pos.	Player	Transferred to	Fee/notes	Date	Source
FW	(United States) Adonis Amaya		Contract option declined.	January 10, 2019	
MF	(Ghana) Emmanuel Appiah		Contract option declined.	January 10, 2019	
MF	(Cameroon) Andre Ulrich Zanga		Contract option declined.	January 10, 2019	
DF	(Cameroon) Jean Jospin Engola		Contract option declined.	January 10, 2019	
GK	(United States) Wade Hamilton		Contract option declined.	January 10, 2019	
MF	(Mexico) Miguel Aguilar		Out of contract.	January 10, 2019	
MF	(United States) Jonathan Hernandez	(Hong Kong) Kitchee SC	Out of contract.	January 10, 2019	
FW	(United States) Justin Dhillon	(United States) Tacoma Defiance	Out of contract.	January 10, 2019	
DF	(France) Diedie Traore	(United States) LA Galaxy	Sign.	March 6, 2019	
FW	(United States) Ethan Zubak	(United States) LA Galaxy	Sign.	March 8, 2019	
FW	(Cuba) Frank López	(United States) San Antonio FC	Loan.	July 15, 2019	

== Competitions ==
=== Friendlies ===
February 6 1	LA Galaxy II	2–2	United States U-18	Carson, California
	Vera 41'; Barton 86'	Report	Harper 53'; Hategan 57'	Stadium: Dignity Health Sports Park

February 8 2	Fresno FC	2–1	LA Galaxy II	Fresno, California
7:00 PM	Daly 25'; Johnson (yellow card) 29'; Chaney 49'	Report	Zubak (yellow card) 34'; Arellano 59'	Stadium: Chukchansi Park

February 16 3	LA Galaxy II	0–1	Sacramento Republic	Carson, California
		Report	Bjev	Stadium: Dignity Health Sports Park

February 20 4	Orange County SC	0–1	LA Galaxy II	Irvine, California
		Report	Zubak 12'	Stadium: Championship Soccer Stadium

=== USL Championship ===
==== Standings ====
Pos	Team	Pld	W	D	L	GF	GA	GD	Pts	Qualification
7	Sacramento Republic	34	14	6	14	50	43	+7	48	Play-In Round
8	Austin Bold FC	34	13	9	12	53	52	+1	48	Play-In Round
9	LA Galaxy II	34	12	12	10	59	62	−3	48	Play-In Round
10	New Mexico United	34	11	13	10	59	57	+2	46	Play-In Round
11	San Antonio FC	34	12	9	13	62	57	+5	45	

Source: USL Championship Standings
Rules for classification: 1) total wins; 2) total goal differential; 3) total goals scored; 4) points earned against top four Conference finishers; 5) disciplinary points; 6) coin toss or drawing of lots

==== Regular season ====
The first match of 2019 season was announced on December 14, 2018. The full regular season schedule was released on December 19, 2018.

All times in Pacific Time Zone.

March 9 1	LA Galaxy II	1–4	Colorado Springs Switchbacks FC	Carson, California
19:00	López (yellow card) 12'; Williams (yellow card) 26'; Acheampong 86'	Report	Malcolm 10', 48', 76'; Yaro (yellow card) 37'; Burt 57'	Stadium: Dignity Health Sports Park; Attendance: 689; Referee: Michael Radchuk

March 16 2	Tacoma Defiance	0–3	LA Galaxy II	Tacoma, Washington
19:00	Rydstrand (yellow card) 79'	Report	Williams 24', 60'; Harvey (yellow card) 29'; Walker 41'; Acheampong (yellow card) 68'	Stadium: Cheney Stadium; Attendance: 2,911; Referee: Victor Rivas

March 23 3	Real Monarchs	5–0	LA Galaxy II	Herriman, Utah
12:00	Ávila 25'; Martínez (yellow card) 48'; Blake (yellow card) 56'; Chang 60', 72'; Ochoa (yellow card) 63'; Etoundi 79'; Jasso 86'	Report	Cuello (yellow card) 42'; Traore (red card) 70'	Stadium: Zions Bank Stadium; Attendance: 1,036; Referee: Elijio Arreguin

March 30 4	LA Galaxy II	3–2	Portland Timbers 2	Carson, California
19:00	Acheampong 34'; Hilliard-Arce 38', 90'	Report	Calixtro 12', 65'; Williamson (yellow card) 78'; Wharton (yellow card) 83'	Stadium: Dignity Health Sports Park; Attendance: 788; Referee: Joseph Salinas

April 6 5	LA Galaxy II	4–2	Tulsa Roughnecks FC	Carson, California
19:00	Zubak 13' (pen.), 61'; Gallagher (yellow card) 22'; Vera (yellow card) 34'; Koreniuk 46', 49'	Report	Bastidas (yellow card) 24'; Lobo 59', 70'; Reyes (yellow card) 82'	Stadium: Dignity Health Sports Park; Attendance: 717; Referee: Mark Allatin

April 13 6	San Antonio FC	2–0	LA Galaxy II	San Antonio, Texas
17:30	Jamieson IV 14'; Lahoud (yellow card) 22'; Guzmán 35'; Hernández (yellow card) 90+1'	Report	Traore (yellow card) 73'; Walker (yellow card) 83'	Stadium: Toyota Field; Attendance: 6,096; Referee: Mike Lavergne

April 24 7	LA Galaxy II	4–4	Rio Grande Valley FC Toros	Carson, California
19:30	Traore 39'; Koreniuk 74', 90+6'; DePuy 87'	Report	Coronado (yellow card) 20'; Hernandez (yellow card) 66'; Salazar 77', 79', 90+1'; Small 83'; Deric (yellow card) 90+3'	Stadium: Dignity Health Sports Park; Attendance: 536; Referee: Alejandro Mariscal

April 29 8	LA Galaxy II	0–0	Las Vegas Lights FC	Carson, California
19:30	Cuello (yellow card) 26'; Romney (yellow card) 39'; Tchilao (yellow card) 48' (yellow-red card) 79'	Report	Scaglia (yellow card) 45+2'; Robinson (yellow card) 52'	Stadium: Dignity Health Sports Park; Attendance: 771; Referee: Victor Rivas

May 4 9	LA Galaxy II	1–0	Austin Bold FC	Carson, California
19:00	Harvey (yellow card) 30'; DePuy (yellow card) 38'; Taylor 56' (o.g.); Vom Steeg (yellow card) 90+2'	Report	Guadarrama (yellow card) 36'; Báez (yellow card) 65'; McFarlane (yellow card) 82'	Stadium: Dignity Health Sports Park; Attendance: 589; Referee: Joseph Salinas

May 12 10	LA Galaxy II	0–3	Fresno FC	Carson, California
19:00	José Hernández (yellow card) 35'; Iloski (yellow card) 51'	Report	Jackson 26' (pen.); Lawal 34', 55'; Ellis-Hayden (yellow card) 47' del Campo (yellow card) 76'; Moses (yellow card) 82'	Stadium: Dignity Health Sports Park; Attendance: 616; Referee: Ismir Pekmic

May 18 11	Rio Grande Valley FC Toros	2–2	LA Galaxy II	Edinburg, Texas
17:30	Foster 34'; Donovan (yellow card) 48'; Salazar 57'	Report	Ontiveros 16'; Requejo (yellow card) 19'; Vera (yellow card) 62'; Shultz (yellow card) 69'; Zubak 90+2'	Stadium: H-E-B Park; Attendance: 4,892; Referee: Alejandro Aguilera Jr

May 25 12	LA Galaxy II	2–2	Orange County SC	Carson, California
19:00	Iloski 2'; López 90+2'	Report	Amico (yellow card) 10'; Quinn 50', (yellow card) 85'; Jones (yellow card) 51'; Vinicius 77', (yellow card) 88'	Stadium: Dignity Health Sports Park; Attendance: 1,068; Referee: Elton García

May 29 13	LA Galaxy II	2–2	Tacoma Defiance	Carson, California
19:30	Vera (yellow card) 40'; DePuy (yellow card) 41'; Fiddes (yellow card) 42'; Romero (yellow card) 42'; Koreniuk (yellow card) 82'; López 87'; Iloski 90'	Report	Dhillon 4', (yellow card) 75'; Daley 21'; Ulysse (yellow card) 23'; Ocampo-Chavez (yellow card) 42'; Gonzalez (yellow card) 43'	Stadium: Dignity Health Sports Park; Attendance: 681; Referee: Malik Badawi

June 1 14	OKC Energy FC	0–0	LA Galaxy II	Oklahoma City, Oklahoma
18:00	Gordon (yellow card) 46'; Harris (yellow card) 53'	Report	Ontiveros (yellow card) 57'; Vera (yellow card) 67'	Stadium: Taft Stadium; Attendance: 3,096; Referee: Sergii Demianchuk

June 8 15	El Paso Locomotive FC	3–0	LA Galaxy II	El Paso, Texas
17:30	Kiesewetter 43', 87'; Salgado 88'; Rezende (yellow card) 90+2'	Report	Zubak (yellow card) 40'; Iloski (red card) 55'	Stadium: Southwest University Park; Attendance: 7,611; Referee: Luis Guardia

June 15 16	Reno 1868 FC	4–2	LA Galaxy II	Reno, Nevada
19:30	Hertzog 7'; Musovski 13'; Gleadle 60'; Apodaca 65'	Report	López 3' (pen.); Williams 30'; Ontiveros (yellow card) 50' (yellow-red card) 80'	Stadium: Greater Nevada Field; Attendance: 5,112; Referee: Calin Radosav

June 22 17	LA Galaxy II	1–1	New Mexico United	Carson, California
19:00	Hilliard-Arce (yellow card) 20'; Fiddes (yellow card) 24'; DePuy 32'; López (yellow card) 45+2'	Report	Wehan (yellow card) 4'; Hamilton (yellow card) 35'; Frater 40'; Sampson (yellow card) 54'	Stadium: Dignity Health Sports Park; Attendance: 1,310; Referee: Mark Allatin

June 29 18	Orange County SC	1–2	LA Galaxy II	Irvine, California
19:00	Vinicius 54'; Seaton (yellow card) 77'; Kontor (yellow card) 90+3'	Report	DePuy (yellow card) 25'; Ontiveros (yellow card) 36'; Harvey (yellow card) 40'; López 47', 86'	Stadium: Champions Soccer Stadium; Attendance: 3,702; Referee: Elijio Arreguin

July 4 19	Las Vegas Lights FC	2–2	LA Galaxy II	Las Vegas, Nevada
19:30	Gonzalez 18'; Fehr (yellow card) 58'; Parra 85' (pen.), (yellow card) 87'	Report	Harvey 30'; López 47'; Tchilao (yellow card) 83'	Stadium: Cashman Field; Attendance: 8,404; Referee: Elton García

July 20 20	LA Galaxy II	1–2	Reno 1868 FC	Carson, California
19:00	Gallagher (yellow card) 2'; Koreniuk 75'; DePuy (yellow card) 90'; Vera (yellow card) 90+3'	Report	Gallagher 9' (o.g.); Carroll (yellow card) 17'; Gleadle (yellow card) 53'; Casiple 70'; Mendiola (yellow card) 90'	Stadium: Dignity Health Sports Park; Attendance: 535; Referee: Michael Radchuk

July 24 21	Tulsa Roughnecks FC	1–3	LA Galaxy II	Tulsa, Oklahoma
17:30	Rodrigo 3'; Rogers (red card) 69'	Report	Shultz 27'; Williams 54'; Cuevas (yellow card) 66'; Vera (yellow card) 68'; Jorge Hernandez 75'; Lopez (yellow card) 85'	Stadium: Oneok Field; Attendance: 1,857; Referee: Kevin Broadley

July 28 22	Portland Timbers 2	1–2	LA Galaxy II	Portland, Oregon
18:00	Asprilla 32'; Williamson (yellow card) 35'	Report	Zubak 7'; Gallagher (yellow card) 20'; Ontiveros (yellow card) 76'; Harvey (yellow card) 90+1'; José Hernández 90+5'	Stadium: Providence Park; Attendance: 1,874; Referee: Alejandro Aguilera

August 3 23	LA Galaxy II	2–3	Phoenix Rising FC	Carson, California
19:00	Vera (yellow card) 28'; Álvarez (yellow card) 33', (goal) 52' (pen.); Zubak 39'	Report	Cochran (yellow card) 51'; Asante 58'; Flemmings 74'; Calistri 83'	Stadium: Dignity Health Sports Park; Attendance: 1,004; Referee: Calin Radosav

August 10 24	Austin Bold FC	1–3	LA Galaxy II	Austin, Texas
17:30	Tyrpak 25'; Phillips (yellow card) 45+1' (yellow-red card) 76'; Taylor (red card) 81'	Report	Acheampong (yellow card) 11'; Hilliard-Arce (yellow card) 34'; Harvey 46'; Williams 59' (pen.); Ontiveros (yellow card) 70'; Koreniuk 90+6'	Stadium: Bold Stadium; Attendance: 2,518; Referee: Rosendo Mendoza

August 17 25	New Mexico United	2–2	LA Galaxy II	Albuquerque, New Mexico
18:30	Wehan 25'; Frater (yellow card) 55', (goal) 77' (pen.); Soler (yellow card) 73'; Sandoval (yellow card) 85'	Report	Kamara 9'; Saldana (yellow card) 25' (yellow-red card) 41'; Hernández (yellow card) 51'; Vera (yellow card) 71'; Williams 74' (pen.)	Stadium: Isotopes Park; Attendance: 15,247; Referee: Lukasz Szpala

August 31 26	LA Galaxy II	1–0	Sacramento Republic FC	Carson, California
19:00	Koreniuk 21'; Kamara (yellow card) 39'; Cuello (yellow card) 54'; Fiddes (yellow card) 56'; Lopez (yellow card) 90+1'	Report	Enevoldsen (yellow card) 20'; Partain (yellow card) 64'; McCrary (yellow card) 82'	Stadium: Dignity Health Sports Park; Attendance: 783; Referee: Michael Radchuk

September 7 27	LA Galaxy II	3–1	Real Monarchs	Carson, California
19:00	Hernández 10', (yellow card) 34'; Hilliard-Arce 15'; Ontiveros (yellow card) 35'; Shultz (yellow card) 51'; Koreniuk (yellow card) 53'; Gutiérrez 68'	Report	Jasso (yellow card) 8'; Portillo (yellow card) 45', (goal) 88'; Powder (yellow card) 75'; Holt (yellow card) 87'	Stadium: Dignity Health Sports Park; Attendance: 1,082; Referee: Alejandro Mariscal

September 14 28	Phoenix Rising FC	4–1	LA Galaxy II	Tempe, Arizona
19:30	Asante 10' (pen.); Flemmings 15', 45'; Lambert (yellow card) 18'; Cochran (yellow card) 27'; Spencer 77'	Report	Harvey (yellow card) 8'; Koreniuk (yellow card) 51', (goal) 76'; Hernández (yellow card) 62'	Stadium: Casino Arizona Field; Attendance: 6,647; Referee: Elijio Arreguin
Note: Match abandoned at the 84th minute due to the bad behavior of the fans.

September 20 29	LA Galaxy II	1–1	San Antonio FC	Carson, California
19:30	Hernandez 8'; Hilliard-Arce (yellow card) 25'; Harvey (yellow card) 61'; Acheampong (yellow card) 82'	Report	López 10'; Pecka (yellow card) 49' (yellow-red card) 52'; Restrepo (yellow card) 84'	Stadium: Dignity Health Sports Park; Attendance: 990; Referee: Michael Radchuk

September 28 30	LA Galaxy II	5–1	OKC Energy FC	Carson, California
19:00	Koreniuk 23'; Zubak 40', 73'; Williams 80'; Hernández 83'	Report	Brown 7'; Gordon (yellow card) 34'; Ross (yellow card) 56'	Stadium: Dignity Health Sports Park; Attendance: 817; Referee: Victor Rivas

October 2 31	Sacramento Republic FC	2–2	LA Galaxy II	Sacramento, California
19:30	Enevoldsen 20', (yellow card) 90+1'; Mahoney 89'; Taintor (red card) 90+5'	Report	Fiddes (yellow card) 8'; Shultz (yellow card) 32'; Zubak 37'; Kamara 72'; Williams (yellow card) 77' (yellow-red card) 90+5'	Stadium: Papa Murphy's Park; Attendance: 9,324; Referee: Elton García

October 5 32	Colorado Springs Switchbacks FC	2–0	LA Galaxy II	Colorado Springs, Colorado
16:00	Hundley 29'; Robinson 40'; Anderson (yellow card) 48'; Argueta (yellow card) 77'; Romero (yellow card) 79'	Report	Kamara (yellow card) 49'; DePuy (yellow card) 70'; Hilliard-Arce (yellow card) 84'	Stadium: Weidner Field; Attendance: 5,008; Referee: Lorant Varga

October 12 33	Fresno FC	2–2	LA Galaxy II	Fresno, California
19:30	Casillas 22'; Alihodžić (yellow card) 45+3'; Kurimoto (yellow card) 63'; Caffa 85' (pen.)	Report	Cuello 30'; Koreniuk (yellow card) 52'; Kamara 90+2'	Stadium: Chukchansi Park; Attendance: 7,742; Referee: JJ Bilinski

October 19 34	LA Galaxy II	2–0	El Paso Locomotive FC	Carson, California
19:00	Zubak 15'; DePuy (yellow card) 34'; Iloski (yellow card) 36'; Kamara 52'; Harvey (yellow card) 64'	Report	Ryan (yellow card) 27'; Ketterer (yellow card) 53'; Salgado (yellow card) 54'; Bosetti (yellow card) 63'	Stadium: Dignity Health Sports Park; Attendance: 1,984; Referee: Greg Dopka

==== Playoffs ====
October 23 Play-In Round	Austin Bold FC	2–0	LA Galaxy II	Austin, Texas
19:30	Twumasi 9', (yellow card) 76'; Lima (yellow card) 32'; Soto (yellow card) 49'; McFarlane 54'; Braafheid (yellow card) 60'	Report	Harvey (yellow card) 35'; Hernández (yellow card) 76'; Kamara (yellow card) 77'	Stadium: Bold Stadium; Attendance: 2,656; Referee: Guido Gonzales Jr.

== See also ==
- 2019 in American soccer
- 2019 LA Galaxy season
