= 2020 LA Galaxy II season =

LA Galaxy II
2020 season
- Head coach: Junior Gonzalez
- Stadium: Dignity Health Sports Park
- USL Championship: Group B: 2nd Overall: 8th
- Playoffs: Conference quarter-finals
- Top goalscorer: Augustine Williams (13 goals)
- Biggest win: Rio Grande Valley FC Toros 1–5 LA Galaxy II (March 8)
- Biggest defeat: Phoenix Rising FC 4–0 LA Galaxy II (July 11)
Home colors	Away colors

The 2020 LA Galaxy II season was the club's seventh season of existence, and their seventh season in the USL Championship, the second tier of the United States Soccer Pyramid.

On March 12, 2020, the USL announced the decision to suspend the 2020 season for a minimum of 30 days due to the COVID-19 pandemic in the United States.

On June 19, 2020, the USL announced that the season will restart on July 11.

== Squad information ==
As of the end of the season.

Note: Flags indicate national team as defined under FIFA eligibility rules; some limited exceptions apply. Players may hold more than one non-FIFA nationality.

No.	Pos.	Nation	Player
12	GK	USA	Eric Lopez
19	DF	FRA	Diedie Traore
28	MF	NED	Kai Koreniuk
40	GK	USA	Anthony Ramos
41	GK	USA	Carlos Zuniga
42	GK	MEX	Abraham Romero
43	MF	USA	Adam Saldana
44	DF	USA	Jalen Neal
45	MF	USA	Adrian Gonzalez
46	DF	GHA	Isaac Bawa
47	FW	USA	Walter Portales
48	FW	SLE	Augustine Williams
49	MF	USA	Adrian Vera
50	MF	MEX	Iván Gutiérrez
51	FW	USA	Carson Klein
52	FW	USA	Caleb Suh
53	DF	USA	Jorge Hernandez
54	FW	USA	Andre Ochoa
55	MF	USA	Sebastian Hernandez
56	MF	MEX	Jonathan Perez
58	DF	USA	Mauricio Cuevas
59	FW	USA	Josue Varela
60	FW	USA	Cameron Dunbar
62	DF	USA	Jesús Vázquez (on loan from Atlante)
63	FW	USA	Sebastian Nava
66	MF	USA	Victor Valdez
67	MF	PAN	Carlos Harvey (on loan from Tauro;)
68	FW	LBR	Mohammed Kamara
70	MF	USA	Alejandro Alvarado Jr.
74	DF	USA	Marcus Ferkranus

Signed to first team contract with LA Galaxy.
LA Galaxy Academy player.

=== Transfers ===
==== Transfers in ====
Pos.	Player	Transferred from	Fee/notes	Date	Source
FW	(Cuba) Frank López	(United States) San Antonio FC	Loan return.		
DF	(Ghana) Isaac Bawa	(United States) FC Golden State Force	Sign.	January 31, 2020	

==== Transfers out ====
Pos.	Player	Transferred to	Fee/notes	Date	Source
MF	(Mexico) José Hernández		Option declined.	December 5, 2019	
MF	(United States) Brian Iloski		Option declined.	December 5, 2019	
MF	(Benin) Don Tchilao		Option declined.	December 5, 2019	
MF	(Ghana) Geoffrey Acheampong		Contract ended.	December 5, 2019	
DF	(United States) Justin Fiddes		Contract ended.	December 5, 2019	
DF	(United States) John Requejo		Contract ended.	December 5, 2019	
DF	(United States) Nate Shultz		Contract ended.	December 5, 2019	
DF	(Tanzania) Abdalla Haji Shaibu	(Czech Republic) MFK Vyškov	Loan return.	December 5, 2019	
MF	(Panama) Ernesto Walker	(Panama) Plaza Amador	Loan return.	December 5, 2019	
DF	(United States) Michael Gallagher		Released.	December 5, 2019	
FW	(Cuba) Frank López	(United States) OKC Energy FC	Sign.	January 13, 2020	
GK	(United States) Eric Lopez	(United States) LA Galaxy	Sign.	January 15, 2020	
DF	(United States) Nick DePuy	(United States) LA Galaxy	Sign.	February 5, 2020	
MF	(United States) Kai Koreniuk	(United States) LA Galaxy	Sign.	June 25, 2020	
DF	(United States) Omar Ontiveros		Released.	September 26, 2020	

== Competitions ==
=== Friendlies ===
February 25	Orange County SC	1–1	LA Galaxy II	Irvine, California
11:30 ET				Stadium: Orange County Great Park

=== USL Championship ===
==== Standings ====
Pos	Team	Pld	W	L	T	GF	GA	GD	Pts	PPG	Qualification
6	New Mexico United	15	8	4	3	23	17	+6	27	1.80	Conference Quarterfinals
7	FC Tulsa	15	6	2	7	21	16	+5	25	1.67	Conference Quarterfinals
8	LA Galaxy II	16	8	6	2	29	32	−3	26	1.63	Conference Quarterfinals
9	Orange County SC	16	7	6	3	18	18	0	24	1.50	
10	San Diego Loyal SC	16	6	5	5	17	18	−1	23	1.44	

Source: USL Championship
Rules for classification: 1) points per game; 2) points; 3) total wins; 4) total goal differential; 5) total goals scored; 6) disciplinary points; 7) coin toss or drawing of lots.

==== Regular season ====
On December 20, 2019, the USL announced the 2020 season schedule.

All times in Pacific Time Zone.

March 8 1	Rio Grande Valley FC Toros	1–5	LA Galaxy II	Edinburg, Texas
16:30	Prpa (yellow card) 19', (goal) 85'	Report	Koreniuk 13', 67'; Dunbar 30'; Williams 53'; Cuevas 88'	Stadium: H-E-B Park; Attendance: 2,300; Referee: Tori Penso

==== Group stage ====
On June 25, 2020, the USL announced the groups alignment for the resumption of play after the COVID-19 pandemic in the United States stopped the regular season. The top two teams in the group qualifies for the postseason.

Pos	Team	Pld	W	D	L	GF	GA	GD	Pts	PPG	Qualification
1	Phoenix Rising FC	16	11	2	3	46	17	+29	35	2.19	Advance to USL Championship Playoffs
2	LA Galaxy II	16	8	2	6	29	32	−3	26	1.63	Advance to USL Championship Playoffs
3	Orange County SC	16	7	3	6	18	18	0	24	1.50	
4	San Diego Loyal SC	16	6	5	5	17	18	−1	23	1.44	
5	Las Vegas Lights FC	16	2	5	9	24	34	−10	11	0.69	

Source: USL
Rules for classification: 1) points; 2) total wins; 3) total goal differential; 4) total goals scored; 5) disciplinary points; 6) coin toss or drawing of lots.

July 11 2	Phoenix Rising FC	4–0	LA Galaxy II	Tempe, Arizona
19:00	Flemmings 9'; Bakero 40' (pen.); Asante 45+2', 81'; King (yellow card) 54'	Report	Bawa (yellow card) 39'; Ontiveros (yellow card) 55'	Stadium: Casino Arizona Field; Attendance: 0 Referee: Isaiah Vlad

July 19 3	San Diego Loyal SC	0–1	LA Galaxy II	San Diego
19:00	C. Martin (yellow card) 22'; E. Martin (yellow card) 66'; Makangila (yellow card) 82'; Jaén (yellow card) 87'	Report	Hernandez (yellow card) 41'; Vázquez 72', (yellow card) 90'	Stadium: Torero Stadium; Attendance: 0 Referee: Ricardo Fierro

July 25 4	LA Galaxy II	1–0	Sacramento Republic FC	Carson, California
19:00	Vázquez (yellow card) 36'; Williams 72'; Hernandez (yellow card) 90+8'	Report	McCrary (yellow card) 16'; Villarreal (yellow card) 27'; Iwasa (yellow card) 67'	Stadium: Dignity Health Sports Park; Attendance: 0 Referee: Brandon Stevis

August 19 7	LA Galaxy II	1–4	Phoenix Rising FC	Carson, California
14:00	Vázquez (yellow card) 6'; Williams 70'	Report	Flemmings 23'; Moar 36'; Schweitzer 63'; Asante 90+6'	Stadium: Dignity Health Sports Park; Attendance: 0 Referee: Brandon Stevis
Note: The decision to postpone the match has been made out of an abundance of caution following the July 29 announcement that numerous covered persons within the LA Galaxy II organization tested positive for COVID-19.

August 22 8	LA Galaxy II	1–2	Orange County SC	Carson, California
19:00	Cuevas 20'; Saldana (yellow card) 25'; Vázquez (yellow card) 84'	Report	Okoli 14'; Smith (yellow card) 50'; Palmer 59', (yellow card) 72'	Stadium: Dignity Health Sports Park; Attendance: 0 Referee: William Hoffman

August 26 9	Portland Timbers 2	2–3	LA Galaxy II	Portland, Oregon
17:00	Stanley (yellow card) 52'; Ornstil 69'; Molloy 90+9'	Report	Williams 13', 90+5', (yellow card) 60'; Alvarado Jr. (yellow card) 21'; Saldana (yellow card) 40'; Neal (yellow card) 72'; Perez 78'	Stadium: Providence Park; Attendance: 0 Referee: Farhad Dadkho

August 30 10	LA Galaxy II	4–3	Las Vegas Lights FC	Carson, California
14:00	Cuevas 5'; Williams 53'; Gutiérrez 62'; Hernandez 74'	Report	Chester 14'; Gr. Robinson (yellow card) 27'; Torre (yellow card) 64'; Fenwick 73'; Frischknecht 87'	Stadium: Dignity Health Sports Park; Attendance: 0 Referee: Ricardo Fierro
Note: Match moved from August 29 to 30.

September 2 6	Orange County SC	2–1	LA Galaxy II	Irvine, California
19:00	Okoli 25', 38'; Crisostomo (yellow card) 55'; Finlayson (yellow card) 59'	Report	Perez 2'; Vera (yellow card) 51'; Hernandez (yellow card) 73'	Stadium: Championship Soccer Stadium; Attendance: 0 Referee: Karen Callado
Note: The decision to postpone the match has been made out of an abundance of caution following the July 29 announcement that numerous covered persons within the LA Galaxy II organization tested positive for COVID-19.

September 5 11	Orange County SC	1–2	LA Galaxy II	Irvine, California
19:00	Alston (yellow card) 25'; Iloski (yellow card) 30'; Palmer 60'; Quinn (yellow card) 65'; Finlayson (yellow card) 85'; Kiernan (yellow card) 90+2'	Report	Williams 8'; Vázquez (yellow card) 22'; Cuevas 27'; Nava (yellow card) 48'; Saldana (yellow card) 85'	Stadium: Championship Soccer Stadium; Attendance: 0 Referee: Joseph Salinas

September 9 12	LA Galaxy II	0–3	San Diego Loyal SC	Carson, California
19:00	Alvarado Jr. (yellow card) 48' (yellow-red card) 65'; Cuevas (yellow card) 63'; Vera (yellow card) 69'	Report	Berry 1', 38'; Rubín 20'; Metcalf (yellow card) 61'	Stadium: Dignity Health Sports Park; Attendance: 0 Referee: Michael Radchuk

September 15 13	LA Galaxy II	3–2	Las Vegas Lights FC	Carson, California
19:00	Williams 37', 84' (pen.); Perez 62'; Nava (yellow card) 65'	Report	Moses 22'; Chester 28'; Delgado (yellow card) 83'	Stadium: Dignity Health Sports Park; Referee: Brandon Stevis

September 23 5	LA Galaxy II	1–1	San Diego Loyal SC	Carson, California
19:00	Neal (yellow card) 22'; Cuevas (yellow card) 37'; Vázquez (yellow card) 60'; Hernandez (yellow card) 69'; Ontiveros (yellow card) 72', (red card) 90+8'; Alvarado Jr. 90+1'	Report	C. Martin (yellow card) 27'; Klimenta (yellow card) 38'; Rubín 42' (pen.); Adams (yellow card) 58'; E. Martin (yellow card) 82' (yellow-red card) 89'; Spencer (yellow card) 90+5'	Stadium: Dignity Health Sports Park; Referee: William Hoffman
Note: Match postponed to September 23 due to covered individuals scheduled to be involved in the match tested positive for COVID-19.

September 26 14	Las Vegas Lights FC	2–2	LA Galaxy II	Las Vegas
19:30	Sandoval 39'; Levin (yellow card) 74'; Burgos (yellow card) 88'; Dally 90+3'	Report	Cuevas (yellow card) 55'; Williams 71'; Perez 81'	Stadium: Cashman Field; Attendance: 0 Referee: Brad Jensen

September 30 15	LA Galaxy II	3–1	Orange County SC	Carson, California
19:00	Williams 10', 68' (pen.); Alvarado Jr. (yellow card) 54'; Perez (yellow card) 58'; Saldana (yellow card) 73'; Hernandez 90+2'	Report	Okoli 6'; Alston (yellow card) 67'; Smith (yellow card) 71'	Stadium: Dignity Health Sports Park; Attendance: 0 Referee: Jon Freemon

October 3 16	Phoenix Rising FC	4–1	LA Galaxy II	Tempe, Arizona
19:30	Moar 10'; King (yellow card) 12'; Stanton 27', 57'; Cochran 51'	Report	Williams 6'; Cuevas (yellow card) 28'; Bawa (yellow card) 40'; Ferkranus (yellow card) 74'	Stadium: Casino Arizona Field; Attendance: 0 Referee: Ricardo Fierro

==== Playoffs ====
October 10 Conference quarter-finals	Reno 1868 FC	4–1	LA Galaxy II	Reno, Nevada
18:00	Partida 4', (yellow card) 45'; Hertzog 35', 59' (pen.), (yellow card) 77'; Langsdorf 53'; Beaury (yellow card) 85'	Report	Neal 10'; Romero (yellow card) 58'; Hernandez (yellow card) 66'; Vázquez (yellow card) 74'; Saldana (red card) 76'	Stadium: Greater Nevada Field; Attendance: 250; Referee: Matthew Thompson

== See also ==
- 2020 in American soccer
- 2020 LA Galaxy season
