= 2020 LA Galaxy season =

American soccer club season

LA Galaxy
2020 season
- Owner: Philip Anschutz (AEG)
- Head coach: Guillermo Barros Schelotto (until October 29)
- Stadium: Dignity Health Sports Park
- MLS: Conference: 10th Overall: 20th
- Playoffs: Did not qualify
- U.S. Open Cup: Canceled
- Leagues Cup: Canceled
- MLS is Back Tournament: Group stage
- Top goalscorer: Cristian Pavón (10 goals)
- Highest home attendance: 26,382 (vs. VAN – March 8)
- Average home league attendance: 26,382
- Biggest win: 3–0 (vs. LAFC – Sept. 6)
- Biggest defeat: 2–6 (vs. LAFC – July 18); 0–4 (vs. SJ – Oct. 14)
Home colors	Away colors

The 2020 LA Galaxy season was the club's twenty-fifth season of existence, their twenty-fifth in Major League Soccer.

On March 12, 2020, the Major League Soccer has suspended all games, for 30 days due to the COVID-19 pandemic in the United States. On March 19, 2020, the suspension was extended with a target return date of May 10.

On June 10, 2020, the MLS is Back Tournament was announced, and began on July 8.

== Players ==
=== Squad information ===
As of August 20, 2020

No.	Position	Player	Nation
1	GK	USA	David Bingham
2	MF	USA	Perry Kitchen
3	DF	ARG	Emiliano Insúa
5	DF	USA	Daniel Steres
8	MF	MEX	Jonathan dos Santos (DP)
10	FW	ARG	Cristian Pavón (on loan from Boca Juniors)
11	MF	COL	Yony González
12	GK	USA	Eric Lopez (HG)
14	FW	MEX	Javier Hernández (DP)
15	MF	USA	Joe Corona
16	MF	USA	Sacha Kljestan
17	MF	USA	Sebastian Lletget
18	GK	USA	Justin Vom Steeg
19	DF	FRA	Diedie Traore
20	DF	USA	Nick DePuy
21	DF	CRC	Giancarlo González
22	DF	USA	Julian Araujo
24	DF	USA	Danilo Acosta
25	DF	VEN	Rolf Feltscher
26	MF	MEX	Efraín Álvarez (HG)
27	MF	ARG	Emil Cuello
28	MF	USA	Kai Koreniuk
29	FW	USA	Ethan Zubak (HG)
31	FW	GER	Gordon Wild
33	GK	USA	Jonathan Klinsmann
56	MF	USA	Jonathan Perez (HG)
60	FW	USA	Cameron Dunbar (HG)
67	MF	PAN	Carlos Harvey

=== Transfers ===
==== Transfers in ====
Pos.	Player	Transferred from	Fee/notes	Date	Source
DF	(United States) Danilo Acosta	(United States) Real Salt Lake	Selected in the 2019 MLS End-of-Year Waiver Draft. Signed on January 8, 2020.	November 25, 2019	
MF	(United States) Sacha Kljestan	(United States) Orlando City SC	Signed as a free agent.	December 11, 2019	
MF	(Serbia) Aleksandar Katai	(United States) Chicago Fire FC	Signed through Targeted Allocation Money.	December 31, 2019	
DF	(Argentina) Emiliano Insúa	(Germany) VfB Stuttgart	Sign.	January 1, 2020	
GK	(United States) Eric Lopez	(United States) LA Galaxy II	Sign.	January 15, 2020	
FW	(Mexico) Javier Hernández	(Spain) Sevilla	Signed as a Designated Player.	January 21, 2020	
DF	(United States) Nick DePuy	(United States) LA Galaxy II	Sign.	February 5, 2020	
FW	(United States) Cameron Dunbar	(United States) LA Galaxy Academy	Sign.	February 20, 2020	
MF	(United States) Jonathan Perez	(United States) LA Galaxy Academy	Sign.	February 21, 2020	
FW	(Germany) Gordon Wild	(United States) D. C. United	Sign.	February 25, 2020	
MF	(United States) Kai Koreniuk	(United States) LA Galaxy II	Sign.	June 25, 2020	
MF	(Panama) Carlos Harvey	(United States) LA Galaxy II	Loan.	June 26, 2020	
MF	(Colombia) Yony González	(Portugal) Benfica	Loan.	August 19, 2020	
GK	(United States) Jonathan Klinsmann	(Switzerland) St. Gallen	Sign.	August 20, 2020	

==== Draft picks ====
Draft picks are not automatically signed to the team roster. Only those who are signed to a contract will be listed as transfers in. Only trades involving draft picks and executed after the start of 2020 MLS SuperDraft will be listed in the notes.

Date	Player	Position	College	Pick	Source
January 9, 2020	(Northern Ireland) Tom Smart	DF	Akron	Round 2 – 45th pick	
January 13, 2020	PASS			Round 3 – 71st pick	
January 13, 2020	PASS			Round 4 – 81st pick	
January 13, 2020	PASS			Round 4 – 97th pick	

==== Transfers out ====
Pos.	Player	Transferred to	Fee/notes	Date	Source
MF	(United States) Chris Pontius	Retired.		October 29, 2019	
DF	(United States) Dave Romney	(United States) Nashville SC	$225,000 in General Allocation Money	November 12, 2019	
FW	(Sweden) Zlatan Ibrahimović	(Italy) AC Milan	Out of contract	November 13, 2019	
MF	(Argentina) Favio Álvarez	(Mexico) UNAM	Loan expired	November 21, 2019	
DF	(Uruguay) Diego Polenta	(Paraguay) Olimpia	Option declined	November 21, 2019	
MF	(Brazil) Juninho	Retired.	Option declined	November 21, 2019	
MF	(Portugal) João Pedro	(Portugal) Tondela	Option declined	November 21, 2019	
DF	(United States) Tomas Hilliard-Arce	(United States) Sacramento Republic FC	Option declined	November 21, 2019	
MF	(United States) Servando Carrasco	(United States) Fort Lauderdale CF	Option declined	November 21, 2019	
GK	(United States) Matt Lampson	(United States) Columbus Crew	Option declined	November 21, 2019	
DF	(United States) Hugo Arellano		Option declined	November 21, 2019	
FW/MF	(Mexico) Uriel Antuna	(Mexico) Guadalajara	Loan expired	November 21, 2019	
MF	(France) Romain Alessandrini	(China) Qingdao Huanghai	Out of contract	January 20, 2020	
DF	(Norway) Jørgen Skjelvik	(Denmark) OB	Loan	January 31, 2020	
MF	(Serbia) Aleksandar Katai	(Serbia) Red Star Belgrade	Released	June 5, 2020	

== Competitions ==
=== Preseason ===
The first preseason games were announced on December 11, 2019.

February 4	LA Galaxy	4–1	Vancouver Whitecaps FC	Carson, California
PT	13'; 30'; 52'; 78'	Report	Cavallini 46'	Stadium: Dignity Health Sports Park

February 15	LA Galaxy	1–2	Toronto FC	Carson, California
15:00 PT	Katai (red card) 32'; Pavón 37'	Report; Report	Achara 45+2'; Pozuelo 77' (pen.)	Stadium: Dignity Health Sports Park; Attendance: 12,200

February 19	LA Galaxy	2–1	Colorado Rapids	Carson, California
	DePuy 45'; Moor 76' (o.g.)	Report	Rubio 15'	Stadium: Dignity Health Sports Park

February 22	LA Galaxy	1–1	Chicago Fire FC	Carson, California
15:00 PT	Kljestan 54'	Report	Azira 84'	Stadium: Dignity Health Sports Park; Attendance: 12,783

=== Major League Soccer ===
==== Standings ====
===== Overall =====
2020 MLS overall standings
Pos	Team	Pld	W	L	T	GF	GA	GD	Pts	PPG
18	Montreal Impact	23	8	13	2	33	43	−10	26	1.13
19	Inter Miami CF	23	7	13	3	25	35	−10	24	1.04
20	LA Galaxy	22	6	12	4	27	46	−19	22	1.00
21	Real Salt Lake	22	5	10	7	25	35	−10	22	1.00
22	Chicago Fire FC	23	5	10	8	33	39	−6	23	1.00

Source: MLS
Rules for classification: 1) points per game; 2) total wins per match played; 3) total goal differential per match played; 4) total goals scored per match played; 5) fewest disciplinary points per match played; 6) away goal differential per away match played; 7) away goals scored per away match played; 8) home goal differential per home match played; 9) home goals scored per home match played; 10) coin toss or drawing of lots.

===== Western Conference =====
Pos	Team	Pld	W	L	T	GF	GA	GD	Pts	PPG	Qualification
8	San Jose Earthquakes	23	8	9	6	35	51	−16	30	1.30	MLS Cup First Round
9	Vancouver Whitecaps FC	23	9	14	0	27	44	−17	27	1.17	
10	LA Galaxy	22	6	12	4	27	46	−19	22	1.00	
11	Real Salt Lake	22	5	10	7	25	35	−10	22	1.00	
12	Houston Dynamo	23	4	10	9	30	40	−10	21	0.91	

Source: MLS
Rules for classification: 1) points per game; 2) total wins per match played; 3) total goal differential per match played; 4) total goals scored per match played; 5) fewest disciplinary points per match played; 6) away goal differential per away match played; 7) away goals scored per away match played; 8) home goal differential per home match played; 9) home goals scored per home match played; 10) coin toss or drawing of lots.

==== Regular season ====
Win Draw Loss Postponed

All times in Pacific Time Zone.

February 29 1	Houston Dynamo	1–1	LA Galaxy	Houston, Texas
12:30	García (yellow card) 49'; Manotas 54'	Report	Pavón 13'; Katai (yellow card) 51'	Stadium: BBVA Stadium; Attendance: 22,039; Referee: Jair Marrufo

March 7 2	LA Galaxy	0–1	Vancouver Whitecaps FC	Carson, California
19:00	Katai (yellow card) 34'; Corona (yellow card) 68' (yellow-red card) 75'; Bingham (yellow card) 88'	Report	Ricketts 74'	Stadium: Dignity Health Sports Park; Attendance: 26,382; Referee: Ismail Elfath

August 22 3	Los Angeles FC	0–2	LA Galaxy	Los Angeles, California
15:00	Blackmon (yellow card) 51'; El Monir (yellow card) 90'	Report	Zubak 26'; Lletget 54'; Kitchen (yellow card) 66'	Stadium: Banc of California Stadium; Attendance: 0 Referee: Ismail Elfath

August 29 5	LA Galaxy	3–2	San Jose Earthquakes	Carson, California
19:30	Steres 33'; Feltscher (yellow card) 52'; Araujo (yellow card) 56'; Pavón 72' (pen.); Lletget 82'	Report	Qazaishvili 11'; Cowell 59'	Stadium: Dignity Health Sports Park; Attendance: 0 Referee: Victor Rivas

September 2 6	Portland Timbers	2–3	LA Galaxy	Portland, Oregon
19:30	Bonilla (yellow card) 12'; Zambrano (yellow card) 48'; Mora 67'; Valeri 90+2'	Report	Álvarez 15'; Pavón 50'; Araujo (yellow card) 63'; Corona 71'	Stadium: Providence Park; Attendance: 0 Referee: Joseph Dickerson

September 6 7	LA Galaxy	3–0	Los Angeles FC	Carson, California
19:30	Kitchen (yellow card) 22'; Pavón 51'; Lletget 73', 83'	Report	Blessing (yellow card) 19'; Kaye (red card) 53'	Stadium: Dignity Health Sports Park; Attendance: 0 Referee: Allen Chapman

September 13 8	San Jose Earthquakes	0–0	LA Galaxy	San Jose, California
20:00	Lima (yellow card) 3'	Report	Steres (yellow card) 17'; Araujo (yellow card) 90+4'	Stadium: Earthquakes Stadium; Attendance: 0 Referee: Timothy Ford

September 19 9	LA Galaxy	0–2	Colorado Rapids	Carson, California
19:30	DePuy (yellow card) 63'; Araujo (yellow card) 72' (yellow-red card) 75'; Steres (yellow card) 90+6'	Report	Bassett 40'; Lewis 78'	Stadium: Dignity Health Sports Park; Attendance: 0 Referee: Ted Unkel

September 23 10	Real Salt Lake	2–0	LA Galaxy	Sandy, Utah
18:30	Baird (yellow card) 62'; Rusnák 65' (pen.); Kreilach 72'	Report	DePuy (yellow card) 24'; Bingham (yellow card) 64'	Stadium: Rio Tinto Stadium; Attendance: 3,943; Referee: Silviu Petrescu

September 27 11	LA Galaxy	1–3	Seattle Sounders FC	Carson, California
19:30	Araujo (yellow card) 40'; Lletget 88'	Report	C. Roldan 12', 61'; Morris 38'	Stadium: Dignity Health Sports Park; Attendance: 0 Referee: Jair Marrufo

October 3 12	San Jose Earthquakes	2–1	LA Galaxy	San Jose, California
19:30	López 42'; Fierro (yellow card) 45'; Yueill (yellow card) 63'; Ríos 82' (pen.); Marcinkowski (yellow card) 90+4'	Report	Lletget 4'; DePuy (yellow card) 12'; Kitchen (yellow card) 31'; dos Santos (yellow card) 45+1'; Corona (yellow card) 60'	Stadium: Earthquakes Stadium; Attendance: 0 Referee: Robert Sibiga

October 7 13	LA Galaxy	3–6	Portland Timbers	Carson, California
19:30	Araujo 34'; Kljestan (yellow card) 41'; Zubak (yellow card) 50', (goal) 55'; Pavón 70', (yellow card) 84'	Report	Mora 14', 60'; Ebobisse 23', 80'; Valeri 47'; Mabiala 63'; D. Chará (yellow card) 72'; Paredes (yellow card) 86'	Stadium: Dignity Health Sports Park; Attendance: 0 Referee: Ramy Touchan

October 10 14	Colorado Rapids	Cancelled	LA Galaxy	Commerce City, Colorado
16:00				Stadium: Dick's Sporting Goods Park
Note: Match was postponed and later cancelled after one new confirmed case of COVID-19 among the Colorado Rapids player pool.

October 14 15	LA Galaxy	0–4	San Jose Earthquakes	Carson, California
19:30	Insúa (yellow card) 47'; Araujo (yellow card) 61'	Report	Lima 44', 90+3'; Ríos 52'; Thompson 76'	Stadium: Dignity Health Sports Park; Attendance: 0 Referee: Alex Chilowicz

October 18 16	LA Galaxy	1–0	Vancouver Whitecaps FC	Carson, California
19:30	Kitchen (yellow card) 45+1'; Koreniuk 90'; Harvey (yellow card) 90+2'	Report	Teibert (yellow card) 89'	Stadium: Dignity Health Sports Park; Attendance: 0 Referee: Victor Rivas

October 25 17	Los Angeles FC	2–0	LA Galaxy	Los Angeles
12:30	Musovski 58'; Vela 90+3'	Report	González (red card) 25'; Depuy (yellow card) 75'	Stadium: Banc of California Stadium; Attendance: 0 Referee: Kevin Stott

October 28 18	Portland Timbers	5–2	LA Galaxy	Portland, Oregon
19:00	Niezgoda 6', 19'; Valeri 30' (pen.); Williamson 60'; Polo 74'	Report	Pavón 46', 90+1'	Stadium: Providence Park; Attendance: 0 Referee: Drew Fischer

November 1 19	LA Galaxy	2–1	Real Salt Lake	Carson, California
19:30	G. González 18', (yellow card) 56'; Pavón 65'; Zubak (yellow card) 68'	Report	Martínez 78'	Stadium: Dignity Health Sports Park; Attendance: 0 Referee: Jon Freemon

November 4 4	LA Galaxy	1–1	Seattle Sounders FC	Carson, California
19:30	Kljestan (yellow card) 20'; Chicharito 78'; Lletget (yellow card) 84'; Bingham (yellow card) 90+3'	Report	Arreaga (yellow card) 24'; O'Neill (yellow card) 72'; Ruidíaz 90+3'	Stadium: Dignity Health Sports Park; Attendance: 0 Referee: Silviu Petrescu
Note: Match postponed from August 26 due to protests following the police shooting of Jacob Blake.

November 8 20	Vancouver Whitecaps FC	3–0	LA Galaxy	Portland, Oregon
15:30	Cavallini 24'; Montero 43', 90+1'	Report	Araujo (red card) 41'; Kitchen (yellow card) 52'	Stadium: Providence Park; Attendance: 0 Referee: Joseph Dickerson

==== MLS is Back Tournament ====
The MLS is Back Tournament is a one-off tournament during the 2020 Major League Soccer season to mark the league's return to action from the COVID-19 pandemic. The tournament will feature a group stage, which will count toward the regular season standings, followed by a knockout round. The LA Galaxy competed in Group F. The schedule was released on July 24, 2020.

Group F results
Pos	Team	Pld	W	D	L	GF	GA	GD	Pts	Qualification
1	Portland Timbers	3	2	1	0	6	4	+2	7	Advanced to knockout stage
2	Los Angeles FC	3	1	2	0	11	7	+4	5	Advanced to knockout stage
3	Houston Dynamo	3	0	2	1	5	6	−1	2	
4	LA Galaxy	3	0	1	2	4	9	−5	1	

Source: MLS
Rules for classification: Group stage tiebreakers

All times in Pacific Time Zone.

July 13 1	LA Galaxy	1–2	Portland Timbers	Bay Lake, Florida
19:30	Chicharito 88'	Report	Župarić (yellow card) 11' (yellow-red card) 75'; Ebobisse 59'; Blanco 66'; Chara (yellow card) 90+5'	Stadium: ESPN Wide World of Sports Complex; Attendance: 0 Referee: Ramy Touchan

July 18 2	Los Angeles FC	6–2	LA Galaxy	Bay Lake, Florida
19:30	Rossi 13' (pen.), 45+2', 75', 90+2'; Jaković (yellow card) 28'; Sisniega (yellow card) 31'; Wright-Phillips 56'; Atuesta (yellow card) 65'; El Monir 80'	Report	Blessing 5' (o.g.); Insúa (yellow card) 16'; Pavón 31' (pen.); Feltscher (yellow card) 45'; Kitchen (yellow card) 52'	Stadium: ESPN Wide World of Sports Complex; Attendance: 0 Referee: Allen Chapman

July 23 3	LA Galaxy	1–1	Houston Dynamo	Bay Lake, Florida
17:00	Steres (yellow card) 84'; Pavón 90+1' (pen.)	Report	Quintero 17', (yellow card) 59'; Struna (yellow card) 45+3'; García (yellow card) 70'	Stadium: ESPN Wide World of Sports Complex; Attendance: 0 Referee: Victor Rivas

=== U.S. Open Cup ===
US Soccer announced the cancellation of the tournament on August 17, 2020, due to the COVID-19 pandemic.

=== Leagues Cup ===
Major League Soccer announced the cancellation of the tournament on May 19, 2020, due to the COVID-19 pandemic.

== Statistics ==
=== Appearances and goals ===
Last updated on February 29, 2020

No.	Pos	Nat	Player	Total		MLS		U.S. Open Cup		Leagues Cup	
No.	Pos	Nat	Player	Apps	Goals	Apps	Goals	Apps	Goals	Apps	Goals
Goalkeepers
1	GK	(United States) USA	David Bingham	1	0	1	0	0	0	0	0
12	GK	(United States) USA	Eric Lopez	0	0	0	0	0	0	0	0
18	GK	(United States) USA	Justin Vom Steeg	0	0	0	0	0	0	0	0
Defenders
3	DF	(Argentina) ARG	Emiliano Insúa	1	0	1	0	0	0	0	0
5	DF	(United States) USA	Daniel Steres	0	0	0	0	0	0	0	0
19	DF	(France) FRA	Diedie Traore	0	0	0	0	0	0	0	0
20	DF	(United States) USA	Nick DePuy	1	0	1	0	0	0	0	0
21	DF	(Costa Rica) CRC	Giancarlo González	1	0	1	0	0	0	0	0
22	DF	(United States) USA	Julian Araujo	0	0	0	0	0	0	0	0
24	DF	(United States) USA	Danilo Acosta	0	0	0	0	0	0	0	0
25	DF	(Venezuela) VEN	Rolf Feltscher	1	0	1	0	0	0	0	0
Midfielders
2	MF	(United States) USA	Perry Kitchen	1	0	1	0	0	0	0	0
7	MF	(Serbia) SRB	Aleksandar Katai	1	0	1	0	0	0	0	0
8	MF	(Mexico) MEX	Jonathan dos Santos	0	0	0	0	0	0	0	0
15	MF	(United States) USA	Joe Corona	1	0	0+1	0	0	0	0	0
16	MF	(United States) USA	Sacha Kljestan	1	0	1	0	0	0	0	0
17	MF	(United States) USA	Sebastian Lletget	1	0	1	0	0	0	0	0
26	MF	(Mexico) MEX	Efrain Alvarez	0	0	0	0	0	0	0	0
27	MF	(United States) USA	Emil Cuello	1	0	0+1	0	0	0	0	0
52	MF	(Netherlands) NED	Kai Koreniuk	0	0	0	0	0	0	0	0
56	MF	(United States) USA	Jonathan Perez	0	0	0	0	0	0	0	0
Forwards
10	FW	(Argentina) ARG	Cristian Pavón	1	1	1	1	0	0	0	0
14	FW	(Mexico) MEX	Javier Hernández	1	0	1	0	0	0	0	0
29	FW	(United States) USA	Ethan Zubak	0	0	0	0	0	0	0	0
31	FW	(Germany) GER	Gordon Wild	0	0	0	0	0	0	0	0
60	FW	(United States) USA	Cameron Dunbar	0	0	0	0	0	0	0	0
Players who have made an appearance or had a squad number this season but have left the club

== See also ==
- 2020 in American soccer
- 2020 LA Galaxy II season
