= 2019 LA Galaxy season =

American soccer club season

LA Galaxy
2019 season
- Owner: Philip Anschutz (AEG)
- Head coach: Guillermo Barros Schelotto
- Stadium: Dignity Health Sports Park
- MLS: Conference: 5th Overall: 8th
- Playoffs: Conference Semifinals
- U.S. Open Cup: Round of 16
- Leagues Cup: Semifinals
- Top goalscorer: League: Zlatan Ibrahimović (30 goals); All: Zlatan Ibrahimović (31 goals)
- Highest home attendance: 27,088 (vs. Los Angeles FC – July 19)
- Lowest home attendance: 5,000 (vs. Orange County FC – June 12)
- Average home league attendance: 23,205
- Biggest win: 7–2 (vs. Sporting KC – September 15)
- Biggest defeat: 0–4 (vs. Portland – June 19) (vs. Portland – July 27)
Home colors	Away colors

The 2019 LA Galaxy season was the club's twenty-fourth season in existence, their twenty-fourth in Major League Soccer.

== Players ==
=== Squad information ===
At the end of the season.

No.	Position	Player	Nation
1	GK	USA	David Bingham
2	MF	USA	Perry Kitchen
3	DF	URU	Diego Polenta
4	DF	USA	Dave Romney
5	DF	USA	Daniel Steres
6	MF	USA	Servando Carrasco
7	MF	FRA	Romain Alessandrini (DP)
8	MF	MEX	Jonathan dos Santos (DP)
9	FW	SWE	Zlatan Ibrahimović (DP)
10	FW	ARG	Cristian Pavón (on loan from Boca Juniors)
11	MF	ARG	Favio Álvarez (on loan from Atlético Tucumán)
12	FW	USA	Chris Pontius
14	MF	USA	Joe Corona
15	DF	FRA	Diedie Traore
16	DF	NOR	Jørgen Skjelvik
17	MF	USA	Sebastian Lletget
18	MF	MEX	Uriel Antuna (on loan from Manchester City)
19	MF	BRA	Juninho
20	DF	USA	Tomas Hilliard-Arce
21	DF	CRC	Giancarlo González
22	DF	USA	Julian Araujo
25	DF	VEN	Rolf Feltscher
26	MF	MEX	Efraín Álvarez (HG)
27	MF	ARG	Emil Cuello
28	GK	USA	Matt Lampson
29	FW	USA	Ethan Zubak (HG)
41	GK	USA	Justin Vom Steeg

=== Transfers ===
==== Transfers in ====
Pos.	Player	Transferred from	Fee/notes	Date	Source
MF	(Brazil) Juninho	(United States) Chicago Fire	$75,000 in General Allocation Money	December 18, 2018	
GK	(United States) Matt Lampson	(United States) Minnesota United FC	Selected in the second stage of 2018 MLS Re-Entry Draft. Officially signed on January 23, 2019.	December 20, 2018	
MF	(Mexico) Uriel Antuna	(England) Manchester City EDS	Loan	January 29, 2019	
DF	(Uruguay) Diego Polenta	(Uruguay) Nacional	Sign	February 7, 2019	
MF	(Argentina) Emil Cuello	(United States) Southern Methodist University	Selected with the 19th pick in the 2019 MLS SuperDraft	February 27, 2019	
DF	(United States) Julian Araujo	(United States) LA Galaxy Academy	Sign	March 1, 2019	
DF	(France) Diedie Traore	(United States) LA Galaxy II	Sign	March 6, 2019	
MF	(United States) Joe Corona	(Mexico) Tijuana	Sign	March 6, 2019	
FW	(United States) Ethan Zubak	(United States) LA Galaxy II	Sign	March 8, 2019	
DF	(Costa Rica) Giancarlo González	(Italy) Bologna	Sign using Targeted Allocation Money	April 11, 2019	
MF	(Argentina) Favio Álvarez	(Argentina) Atlético Tucumán	Loan	May 7, 2019	
FW	(Argentina) Cristian Pavón	(Argentina) Boca Juniors	Loan	August 8, 2019	

==== Draft picks ====
Draft picks are not automatically signed to the team roster. Only those who are signed to a contract will be listed as transfers in. Only trades involving draft picks and executed after the start of 2019 MLS SuperDraft will be listed in the notes.

Date	Player	Position	College	Pick	Source
January 11, 2019	N/A	N/A	N/A	Round 1 – 12th pick – New York City FC acquired this pick, in exchange for their own first-round 2019 SuperDraft pick and $75,000 of General Allocation Money	
January 11, 2019	(Argentina) Emil Cuello	MF	Southern Methodist University	Round 1 – 19th pick	
January 11, 2019	(Benin) Don Tchilao	MF	Oregon State University	Round 2 – 36th pick	
January 14, 2019	PASS			Round 3 – 51st pick	
January 14, 2019	PASS			Round 3 – 52nd pick	
January 14, 2019	PASS			Round 3 – 60th pick	
January 14, 2019	PASS			Round 4 – 86th pick	

==== Transfers out ====
Pos.	Player	Transferred to	Fee/notes	Date	Source
DF	(France) Michaël Ciani		Contract option declined	November 26, 2018	
GK	(United States) Brian Sylvestre	(United States) Forward Madison	Contract option declined	November 26, 2018	
FW	(Costa Rica) Ariel Lassiter	(Costa Rica) Alajuelense	Contract option declined	November 26, 2018	
DF	(United States) Sheanon Williams		Contract option declined	November 26, 2018	
DF	(England) Ashley Cole	(England) Derby County	Contract option declined	November 26, 2018	
MF	(Bosnia and Herzegovina) Baggio Hušidić		Contract option declined	November 26, 2018	
MF	(Portugal) João Pedro	(Portugal) Tondela	Loan	January 31, 2019	
FW	(United States) Bradford Jamieson IV	(United States) San Antonio FC	Loan	February 20, 2019	
FW	(Norway) Ola Kamara	(China) Shenzhen F.C.	US$3,500,000	February 27, 2019	
FW	(Mexico) Giovani dos Santos	(Mexico) América	Released	March 1, 2019	
DF	(United States) Hugo Arellano	(United States) Orange County SC	Loan	March 15, 2019	
FW	(Ghana) Emmanuel Boateng	(United States) D.C. United	Acquired $250,000 of Targeted Allocation Money	August 7, 2019	

== Competitions ==
=== Preseason ===
All times are in Pacific Time Zone.

The preseason schedule was announced on December 21, 2018.

February 5 1	LA Galaxy	4–1	Vissel Kobe	Carson, California
	Kamara, Boateng (o.g)	Report	Wellington	Stadium: Dignity Health Sports Park

February 9 2	LA Galaxy	1–1	Toronto FC	Carson, California
19:30	Mohammed 55' (o.g.)	Report	Romney 86' (o.g.)	Stadium: Dignity Health Sports Park

February 13 3	LA Galaxy	0–0	Atlanta United FC	Carson, California
12:00	Polenta (yellow card)	Report	Larentowicz (yellow card) ?' (yellow-red card) 45'	Stadium: Dignity Health Sports Park
Note: Match was played behind closed doors.

February 13 4	LA Galaxy	0–2	Atlanta United FC	Carson, California
		Report	Villabla; Williams	Stadium: Dignity Health Sports Park
Note: Match was played behind closed doors.

February 16 5	LA Galaxy	0–0	Vancouver Whitecaps FC	Carson, California
17:00		Report	Reyna (yellow card)	Stadium: Dignity Health Sports Park
Note: Closed-door

February 23 6	LA Galaxy	1–3	Colorado Rapids	Carson, California
20:00	Ibrahimović 77'	Report	Kamara 42'; Rubio 69', 85'	Stadium: Dignity Health Sports Park

=== Major League Soccer ===
==== Standings ====
===== Overall =====
2019 MLS regular season standings
Pos	Team	Pld	W	L	T	GF	GA	GD	Pts	Qualification
6	Real Salt Lake	34	16	13	5	46	41	+5	53	Leagues Cup
7	Minnesota United FC	34	15	11	8	52	43	+9	53	Leagues Cup
8	LA Galaxy	34	16	15	3	58	59	−1	51	Leagues Cup
9	Toronto FC	34	13	10	11	57	52	+5	50	Leagues Cup
10	D.C. United	34	13	10	11	42	38	+4	50	Leagues Cup

Source: MLS
Rules for classification: 1) points; 2) total wins; 3) total goal differential; 4) total goals scored; 5) disciplinary points; 6) away goals scored; 7) away goal differential; 8) coin toss or drawing of lots

===== Western Conference =====
2019 MLS Western Conference standings
Pos	Team	Pld	W	L	T	GF	GA	GD	Pts	Qualification
3	Real Salt Lake	34	16	13	5	45	41	+4	53	MLS Cup First Round
4	Minnesota United FC	34	15	11	8	52	42	+10	53	MLS Cup First Round
5	LA Galaxy	34	16	15	3	56	55	+1	51	MLS Cup First Round
6	Portland Timbers	34	14	13	7	49	48	+1	49	MLS Cup First Round
7	FC Dallas	34	13	12	9	48	46	+2	48	MLS Cup First Round

Source: MLS
Rules for classification: 1) points; 2) total wins; 3) total goal differential; 4) total goals scored; 5) disciplinary points; 6) away goal differential; 7) away goals scored; 8) home goals scored; 9) home goal differential; 10) coin toss or drawing of lots

==== Regular season ====
All times are in Pacific Time Zone.

Win Draw Loss Void Postponed

The first match of the 2019 season was announced on December 20, 2018. The full schedule was released on January 7, 2019.

March 2 1	LA Galaxy	2–1	Chicago Fire	Carson, California
17:00	Steres 68'; Ibrahimović 80'; Alvarez (yellow card) 83'	Report	Marcelo (yellow card) 44'; Sapong 49'	Stadium: Dignity Health Sports Park; Attendance: 25,866; Referee: Allen Chapman

March 9 2	FC Dallas	2–0	LA Galaxy	Frisco, Texas
12:30	Ziegler 53' (pen.); Acosta 61'; Hedges (yellow card) 63'; Barrios (yellow card) 80'	Report	Feltscher (yellow card) 21'; Lletget (yellow card) 35'; Steres (yellow card) 71'; Polenta (yellow card) 75'; Dos Santos (yellow card) 90+4'	Stadium: Toyota Stadium; Attendance: 17,220; Referee: Armando Villarreal

March 16 3	LA Galaxy	3–2	Minnesota United FC	Carson, California
19:30	Dos Santos 36' (pen.); Pontius 41'; Lletget 81'; Corona (yellow card) 82'	Report	Ibarra (yellow card) 60'; Greguš 75'; Rodríguez 87'; Danladi (yellow card) 90+2'	Stadium: Dignity Health Sports Park; Attendance: 21,177; Referee: Jair Marrufo

March 31 4	LA Galaxy	2–1	Portland Timbers	Carson, California
18:00	Ibrahimovic 33' (pen.), 65' (pen.), (yellow card) 80'; Dos Santos (yellow card) 68'; Lletget (yellow card) 75'	Report	Ebobisse 44'; Blanco (yellow card) 59'; Valeri (yellow card) 65'	Stadium: Dignity Health Sports Park; Attendance: 23,820; Referee: Ted Unkel

April 5 5	Vancouver Whitecaps FC	0–2	LA Galaxy	Vancouver, British Columbia
19:00	Montero (yellow card) 86'; Felipe (yellow card) 90'	Report	Dos Santos (yellow card) 16'; Alessandrini (yellow card) 44'; Steres 63'; Ibrahimović 71'	Stadium: BC Place; Attendance: 22,120; Referee: Baldomero Toledo

April 13 6	LA Galaxy	2–0	Philadelphia Union	Carson, California
19:30	Ibrahimovic 27', 36' (pen.); Lletget (yellow card) 62'	Report	Wagner (yellow card) 45+2'; Trusty (yellow card) 47' (yellow-red card) 76'	Stadium: Dignity Health Sports Park; Attendance: 24,053; Referee: David Gantar

April 19 7	LA Galaxy	2–1	Houston Dynamo	Carson, California
19:30	Ibrahimović 31' (pen.); Polenta 88'	Report	DeLaGarza (yellow card) 29'; Vera (yellow card) 47'; Elis 53' (pen.), (yellow card) 85'	Stadium: Dignity Health Sports Park; Attendance: 21,503; Referee: Jair Marrufo

April 24 8	Minnesota United FC	0–0	LA Galaxy	Saint Paul, Minnesota
17:00	Métanire (yellow card) 40'	Report	Bingham (yellow card) 84'; Skjelvik (yellow card) 90+6'	Stadium: Allianz Field; Attendance: 19,779; Referee: Chris Penso

April 28 9	LA Galaxy	2–1	Real Salt Lake	Carson, California
17:00	Antuna 16'; Ibrahimović (yellow card) 60', (goal) 78'; Polenta (yellow card) 82'	Report	Kreilach (yellow card) 32'; Toia 64'	Stadium: Dignity Health Sports Park; Attendance: 20,615; Referee: Joe Dickerson

May 4 10	New York Red Bulls	3–2	LA Galaxy	Harrison, New Jersey
11:00	Tarek 15'; Rzatkowski 59'; Etienne 67'	Report	Antuna 39'; Ibrahimović 43'	Stadium: Red Bull Arena; Attendance: 20,128; Referee: Nima Saghafi

May 8 11	Columbus Crew SC	3–1	LA Galaxy	Columbus, Ohio
16:30	Zardes 27'; Higuaín 53'; Mensah (yellow card) 61'; Jiménez 66'	Report	Antuna (yellow card) 59'; Polenta (yellow card) 80'; Steres 87'	Stadium: Mapfre Stadium; Attendance: 13,207; Referee: Rubiel Vazquez

May 11 12	LA Galaxy	0–2	New York City FC	Carson, California
13:00	Carrasco (yellow card) 79'; Ibrahimović (yellow card) 87'; Corona (yellow card) 90'	Report	Héber 44'; Moralez 45+6' (pen.); Johnson (yellow card) 87'	Stadium: Dignity Health Sports Park; Attendance: 22,806; Referee: Chris Penso

May 19 13	LA Galaxy	0–1	Colorado Rapids	Carson, California
17:00	Corona (yellow card) 34'; Polenta (yellow card) 43'; E. Álvarez (yellow card) 90+1'	Report	Lewis (yellow card) 38'; Shinyashiki 82'	Stadium: Dignity Health Sports Park; Attendance: 19,015; Referee: Drew Fischer

May 24 14	Orlando City SC	0–1	LA Galaxy	Orlando, Florida
16:00	Jansson (yellow card) 86'	Report	Cuello (yellow card) 17'; Dos Santos 19'; González (yellow card) 45+1'; Corona (yellow card) 87'	Stadium: Orlando City Stadium; Attendance: 24,712; Referee: Allen Chapman

May 29 15	Sporting Kansas City	0–2	LA Galaxy	Kansas City, Kansas
17:30	Ilie (yellow card) 59'	Report	González (yellow card) 33'; F. Álvarez 55'; Ibrahimović 86'	Stadium: Children's Mercy Park; Attendance: 19,979; Referee: Robert Sibiga

June 2 16	LA Galaxy	1–2	New England Revolution	Carson, California
19:30	Ibrahimović (yellow card) 24', (goal) 84'; F. Álvarez (yellow card) 73'	Report	Penilla 45'; Bunbury 60'; Agudelo (yellow card) 90'	Stadium: Dignity Health Sports Park; Attendance: 20,828; Referee: Alex Chilowicz

June 22 17	FC Cincinnati	0–2	LA Galaxy	Cincinnati, Ohio
16:30	Bertone (yellow card) 61'; Hagglund (yellow card) 79'	Report	Boateng 12', (yellow card) 80'; F. Álvarez 15'; Araujo (yellow card) 57'	Stadium: Nippert Stadium; Attendance: 32,250; Referee: Marcos de Oliveira

June 29 18	San Jose Earthquakes	3–0	LA Galaxy	Stanford, California
19:00	Qazaishvili 11'; Salinas 82', (yellow card) 83'; Thompson 85'	Report	Polenta (yellow card) 51'; F. Álvarez (yellow card) 67'	Stadium: Stanford Stadium; Attendance: 50,850; Referee: Kevin Stott

July 4 19	LA Galaxy	2–0	Toronto FC	Carson, California
19:30	Steres (yellow card) 6'; F. Álvarez (yellow card) 28'; Ibrahimović 75', 89'; Polenta (yellow card) 76'	Report	Fraser (yellow card) 44'	Stadium: Dignity Health Sports Park; Attendance: 25,482; Referee: Ramy Touchan

July 12 20	LA Galaxy	1–3	San Jose Earthquakes	Carson, California
20:00	Feltscher 2'; Corona (yellow card) 31'; Skjelvik (yellow card) 32'; Ibrahimovic (yellow card) 89'	Report	Thompson (yellow card) 7'; Judson (yellow card) 56'; Qazaishvili 61'; Hoesen 64'; López (yellow card) 68'; Yueill 85'	Stadium: Dignity Health Sports Park; Attendance: 22,508; Referee: Nima Saghafi

July 19 21	LA Galaxy	3–2	Los Angeles FC	Carson, California
19:00	Ibrahimović 8', 56', 70'; Polenta (yellow card) 21'; Dos Santos (yellow card) 35'; Araujo (yellow card) 61'; F. Álvarez (yellow card) 74'; Feltscher (yellow card) 84'	Report	Vela 4' (pen.), 90+7'; Atuesta (yellow card) 39'; Kaye (yellow card) 51'; Segura (yellow card) 74'	Stadium: Dignity Health Sports Park; Attendance: 27,088; Referee: Jair Marrufo

July 27 22	Portland Timbers	4–0	LA Galaxy	Portland, Oregon
19:30	Paredes (yellow card) 16', (goal) 37', 81'; Zambrano (yellow card) 24'; Valeri 41', (yellow card) 42'; Ebobisse 88'; Asprilla (red card) 90+4'	Report	Polenta (yellow card) 58' (yellow-red card) 90+4'; Feltscher (yellow card) 61'; Ibrahimović (yellow card) 76'; E. Álvarez (red card) 84'	Stadium: Providence Park; Attendance: 25,218; Referee: Allen Chapman

August 3 23	Atlanta United FC	3–0	LA Galaxy	Atlanta, Georgia
14:00	Romney 23' (o.g.); González 43' (o.g.); J. Martínez 72' (pen.); G. Martínez (yellow card) 75'	Report	Feltscher (yellow card) 52'; González (yellow card) 71'; Araujo (yellow card) 89'	Stadium: Mercedes-Benz Stadium; Attendance: 72,548; Referee: Drew Fischer

August 11 24	D.C. United	2–1	LA Galaxy	Washington, D.C.
16:30	Arriola 28'; Rodríguez 73'; Amarikwa (yellow card) 75'	Report	F. Álvarez 48'	Stadium: Audi Field; Attendance: 20,006; Referee: Alan Kelly

August 14 25	LA Galaxy	2–0	FC Dallas	Carson, California
19:30	Ibrahimović 68', 82' (pen.); Feltscher (yellow card) 90'	Report	Acosta (yellow card) 90+5'	Stadium: Dignity Health Sports Park; Attendance: 19,653; Referee: Ismail Elfath

August 17 26	LA Galaxy	2–2	Seattle Sounders FC	Carson, California
19:00	Steres (red card) 6'; Ibrahimović 45', 65' (pen.)	Report	Morris (yellow card) 21'; Ruidíaz 42'; Skjelvik 82' (o.g.)	Stadium: Dignity Health Sports Park; Attendance: 26,213; Referee: Robert Sibiga

August 25 27	Los Angeles FC	3–3	LA Galaxy	Los Angeles, California
19:30	Blessing 12', 45+1'; Vela 53'	Report	Ibrahimović 2', 15', (yellow card) 84'; Pavón 16'; Skjelvik (yellow card) 28'; González (yellow card) 51'; F. Álvarez (yellow card) 81'; Carrasco (yellow card) 84'	Stadium: Banc of California Stadium; Attendance: 22,757; Referee: Allen Chapman

September 1 28	Seattle Sounders FC	4–3	LA Galaxy	Seattle, Washington
15:30	Ruidíaz 45+2'; Arreaga (yellow card) 47'; Roldan 55', 89'; Morris 77'	Report	González (yellow card) 6'; Polenta (yellow card) 62'; Ibrahimović 66'; Antuna 75'; Skjelvik 81'	Stadium: CenturyLink Field; Attendance: 46,673; Referee: Chris Penso

September 11 29	Colorado Rapids	2–1	LA Galaxy	Commerce City, Colorado
18:00	Bassett 79'; Mezquida 85' (pen.); Price (yellow card) 89'; Shinyashiki (yellow card) 90+7'	Report	Skjelvik (yellow card) 38'; Steres (yellow card) 79'; González 82'; Pavón (yellow card) 90+6'	Stadium: Dick's Sporting Goods Park; Attendance: 10,945; Referee: Fotis Bazakos

September 15 30	LA Galaxy	7–2	Sporting Kansas City	Carson, California
19:00	Feltscher (yellow card) 14'; Ibrahimović 32', 51', 85'; Corona 48', (yellow card) 89'; Antuna 69'; Lletget 77', 79'	Report	Gutiérrez 24', 86'; Smith (yellow card) 43'; Gerso (yellow card) 45+3'; Ilie (yellow card) 76'	Stadium: Dignity Health Sports Park; Attendance: 22,465; Referee: Ted Unkel

September 21 31	LA Galaxy	2–1	Montreal Impact	Carson, California
19:30	Dos Santos (yellow card) 29'; Ibrahimović 31'; Antuna 50'	Report	Lappalainen 48'	Stadium: Dignity Health Sports Park; Attendance: 25,482; Referee: Kevin Stott

September 25 32	Real Salt Lake	1–2	LA Galaxy	Sandy, Utah
18:30	Rusnák (yellow card) 82'; Onuoha 89'	Report	Polenta (yellow card) 36'; Pavón 50'; Steres (yellow card) 60'; Ibrahimović 80'	Stadium: Rio Tinto Stadium; Attendance: 20,838; Referee: Rubiel Vazquez

September 29 33	LA Galaxy	3–4	Vancouver Whitecaps FC	Carson, California
16:30	Ibrahimović 23'; Lletget (yellow card) 34'; Antuna 58'; Pontius 86'	Report	Henry 20'; Bair 41'; Ricketts 64'; Chirinos 90+3'	Stadium: Dignity Health Sports Park; Attendance: 25,903; Referee: Alan Kelly

October 6 34	Houston Dynamo	4–2	LA Galaxy	Houston, Texas
13:00	Ramírez 45+2', 83'; Elis 62'; García (yellow card) 70'; Rodríguez 90+4'	Report	Ibrahimović 9'; Feltscher (yellow card) 45+1'; Pavón 54'	Stadium: BBVA Compass Stadium; Attendance: 21,777; Referee: Allen Chapman

=== Playoffs ===
All times are in Pacific Time Zone.

==== First round ====
October 20 First round	Minnesota United FC	1–2	LA Galaxy	Saint Paul, Minnesota
17:30	Alonso (yellow card) 80'; Greguš 87'	Report	Polenta (yellow card) 33'; González (yellow card) 44'; Lletget 71'; Dos Santos 75'; Alessandrini (yellow card) 90+1'	Stadium: Allianz Field; Attendance: 19,939; Referee: Ted Unkel

==== Conference Semifinals ====
October 24 Conference Semifinals	Los Angeles FC	5–3	LA Galaxy	Los Angeles, California
19:30	Vela 16', 40'; Rossi 66'; Diomande 68', 80'	Report	Kitchen (yellow card) 27'; Pavón 41'; Ibrahimović 55', (yellow card) 86'; Feltscher 77'; Alessandrini (yellow card) 89'	Stadium: Banc of California Stadium; Attendance: 22,902; Referee: Kevin Stott

=== U.S. Open Cup ===
All times are in Pacific Time Zone.

==== Fourth round ====
The draw was held on May 30, 2019.

June 12	LA Galaxy (California)	3–0	(California) Orange County FC	Carson, California
19:30	F. Álvarez (yellow card) 52'; E. Álvarez 55', 61'; Cuello 90'; Bingham (yellow card) 90+2'	Report	Davis (yellow card) 68'; Bryant (yellow card) 90+2'	Stadium: Dignity Health Sports Park; Attendance: 5,000; Referee: Alejandro Mariscal

==== Round of 16 ====
The draw was held on June 13, 2019.

June 19	Portland Timbers (Oregon)	4–0	(California) LA Galaxy	Portland, Oregon
20:00	Kitchen 28' (o.g.); Fernández 34'; Blanco 37'; Moreira 82'	Report	Carrasco (yellow card) 45+2'	Stadium: Providence Park; Attendance: 16,235; Referee: Victor Rivas

=== Leagues Cup ===
All times are in Pacific Time Zone.

The tournament and schedule was announced on May 29, 2019.

==== Quarterfinal ====
July 23	LA Galaxy (United States)	2–2 (3–1 p)	(Mexico) Tijuana	Carson, California
20:00	Boateng 27'; Araujo (yellow card) 51' (yellow-red card) 90+3'; Romney 54'; Tchilao (yellow card) 90'	Report	Nahuelpán 33'; Camacho 45'; Sanvezzo (yellow card) 73'	Stadium: Dignity Health Sports Park; Attendance: 10,421; Referee: Saíd Martínez (Honduras)
	Penalties
	Carrasco (penalty scored); E. Álvarez (penalty missed); Cuello (penalty missed); Boateng (penalty scored); González (penalty scored)		(penalty missed) Torres; (penalty scored) Nahuelpán; (penalty missed) Braghieri; (penalty missed) Sepúlveda

==== Semifinal ====
August 20	LA Galaxy (United States)	1–2	(Mexico) Cruz Azul	Carson, California
19:30	Cuello 37'	Report	Madueña 4'; Lichnovsky (yellow card) 32'; Pineda 47'; Yotún (yellow card) 88'	Stadium: Dignity Health Sports Park; Attendance: 20,135; Referee: Mario Escobar (Guatemala)

== Statistics ==
=== Appearances and goals ===
Last updated on August 11, 2019

No.	Pos	Nat	Player	Total		MLS		U.S. Open Cup		Leagues Cup	
No.	Pos	Nat	Player	Apps	Goals	Apps	Goals	Apps	Goals	Apps	Goals
Goalkeepers
1	GK	(United States) USA	David Bingham	25	0	24	0	1	0	0	0
28	GK	(United States) USA	Matt Lampson	2	0	0	0	1	0	1	0
41	GK	(United States) USA	Justin Vom Steeg	0	0	0	0	0	0	0	0
Defenders
3	DF	(Uruguay) URU	Diego Polenta	21	1	19	1	1+1	0	0	0
4	DF	(United States) USA	David Romney	9	1	5+1	0	2	0	1	1
5	DF	(United States) USA	Daniel Steres	25	3	23	3	2	0	0	0
15	DF	(France) FRA	Diedie Traore	5	0	3+1	0	1	0	0	0
16	DF	(Norway) NOR	Jørgen Skjelvik	15	0	14	0	0	0	1	0
20	DF	(United States) USA	Tomas Hilliard-Arce	2	0	0	0	1	0	0+1	0
21	DF	(Costa Rica) CRC	Giancarlo González	15	0	11+3	0	0	0	1	0
22	DF	(United States) USA	Julian Araujo	14	0	8+4	0	1	0	1	0
25	DF	(Venezuela) VEN	Rolf Feltscher	16	1	16	1	0	0	0	0
Midfielders
2	MF	(United States) USA	Perry Kitchen	10	0	6+2	0	2	0	0	0
6	MF	(United States) USA	Servando Carrasco	12	0	2+8	0	1	0	1	0
7	MF	(France) FRA	Romain Alessandrini	5	0	5	0	0	0	0	0
8	MF	(Mexico) MEX	Jonathan dos Santos	20	2	20	2	0	0	0	0
12	MF	(United States) USA	Chris Pontius	17	1	5+10	1	1+1	0	0	0
14	MF	(United States) USA	Joe Corona	23	0	21+1	0	1	0	0	0
17	MF	(United States) USA	Sebastian Lletget	20	1	18+2	1	0	0	0	0
18	MF	(Mexico) MEX	Uriel Antuna	21	2	21	2	0	0	0	0
19	MF	(Brazil) BRA	Juninho	4	0	0+2	0	1+1	0	0	0
26	MF	(Mexico) MEX	Efrain Alvarez	12	2	2+7	0	2	2	1	0
27	MF	(United States) USA	Emil Cuello	11	1	2+6	0	0+2	1	1	0
30	MF	(United States) USA	Don Tchilao	1	0	0	0	0	0	0+1	0
52	MF	(Netherlands) NED	Kai Koreniuk	1	0	0	0	0	0	1	0
Forwards
9	FW	(Sweden) SWE	Zlatan Ibrahimović	19	16	19	16	0	0	0	0
11	FW	(Argentina) ARG	Favio Álvarez	13	3	12	3	1	0	0	0
29	FW	(United States) USA	Ethan Zubak	6	0	0+3	0	1+1	0	1	0
Players who have made an appearance or had a squad number this season but have left the club
21	DF	(United States) USA	Hugo Arellano	0	0	0	0	0	0	0	0
24	MF	(Ghana) GHA	Emmanuel Boateng	24	2	7+14	1	2	0	1	1

=== Top scorers ===
As of October 25, 2019

Rank	Position	No.	Name	MLS	Playoffs	Open Cup	Leagues Cup	Total
1	FW	9	(Sweden) Zlatan Ibrahimović	30	1	0	0	31
2	MF	18	(Mexico) Uriel Antuna	6	0	0	0	6
3	MF	17	(United States) Sebastian Lletget	3	1	0	0	4
3	FW	10	(Argentina) Cristian Pavón	3	1	0	0	4
5	FW	11	(Argentina) Favio Álvarez	3	0	0	0	3
5	MF	8	(Mexico) Jonathan dos Santos	2	1	0	0	3
5	DF	5	(United States) Daniel Steres	3	0	0	0	3
8	MF	26	(Mexico) Efraín Álvarez	0	0	2	0	2
8	FW	24	(Ghana) Emmanuel Boateng	1	0	0	1	2
8	MF	27	(Argentina) Emil Cuello	0	0	1	1	2
8	DF	25	(Venezuela) Rolf Feltscher	1	1	0	0	2
8	DF	3	(Uruguay) Diego Polenta	2	0	0	0	2
8	MF	12	(United States) Chris Pontius	2	0	0	0	2
14	MF	14	(United States) Joe Corona	1	0	0	0	1
14	DF	21	(Costa Rica) Giancarlo González	1	0	0	0	1
14	DF	4	(United States) David Romney	0	0	0	1	1
14	DF	16	(Norway) Jørgen Skjelvik	1	0	0	0	1
Total				58	5	3	3	69

== See also ==
- 2019 in American soccer
- 2019 LA Galaxy II season
