= Iván Gutiérrez =

Iván Gutiérrez may refer to:

- Iván Gutiérrez (cyclist) (born 1978), Spanish road cyclist
- Iván Gutiérrez (footballer) (born 1998), Mexican footballer
