= Kai Koreniuk =

Dutch footballer (born 1998)

Personal information
- Date of birth: 1 March 1998 (age 28)
- Place of birth: Ormond Beach, Florida, United States
- Height: 1.83 m (6 ft 0 in)
- Positions: Forward; winger

Team information
- Current team: Ventura County FC
- Number: 93

Youth career
- –2013: Orlando City
- 2013–2016: Vitesse

Senior career*
Years	Team	Apps	(Gls)
2015–2017	Jong Vitesse	24	(13)
2017–2019	Jong AZ	33	(2)
2019–2021	LA Galaxy II	41	(14)
2019–2021	LA Galaxy	4	(1)
2023	San Antonio FC	1	(0)
2024	Blauw Geel '38	3	(0)
2025–	Ventura County FC	0	(0)

International career^{‡}
2014	Netherlands U16	3	(0)
2014	United States U17	4	(1)
2015	Netherlands U18	6	(2)
- * Club domestic league appearances and goals as of April 10, 2023 ‡ National team caps and goals as of November 11, 2020

Kai Koreniuk (born 1 March 1998) is a Dutch-American footballer. Born in the United States, he has represented both the United States and Netherlands internationally.

== Club career ==
Koreniuk played varsity soccer for Seabreeze High School in Daytona Beach, Florida in 2012–13 before moving to the Netherlands the following summer. He made his Eerste Divisie debut for Jong AZ on 25 August 2017 in a game against RKC Waalwijk.

On 7 March 2019, Koreniuk joined USL Championship side LA Galaxy II.

Koreniuk appeared for LA Galaxy's first-team on 23 July 2019, during a 2019 Leagues Cup fixture against Club Tijuana.

On 25 June 2020, Koreniuk moved permanently to LA Galaxy's first team roster. Following the 2021 season, Koreniuk was released by the Galaxy.

On 6 April 2023, Koreniuk signed a short-term 25-day deal with USL Championship side San Antonio FC.

== International career ==
Koreniuk was born in the United States to an American father and Dutch mother. He was raised in the United States, and move to the Netherlands as a teenager to further his career. He has represented both countries as a youth international.

== Career statistics ==
=== Club ===
As of match played 9 November 2020

Appearances and goals by club, season and competition
Club	Season	League			National Cup		Continental		Other		Total	
Club	Season	Division	Apps	Goals	Apps	Goals	Apps	Goals	Apps	Goals	Apps	Goals
Jong Vitesse	2015–16	Beloften Eredivisie	5	4	—		—		—		5	4
Jong Vitesse	2016–17	Tweede Divisie	19	9	—		—		—		19	9
Jong Vitesse	Total		24	13	0	0	0	0	0	0	24	13
Jong AZ	2017–18	Eerste Divisie	22	2	—		—		—		22	2
Jong AZ	2018–19	Eerste Divisie	11	0	—		—		—		11	2
Jong AZ	Total		33	2	0	0	0	0	0	0	33	2
LA Galaxy II	2019	USLC	29	9	—		—		1 (Note: Appearance(s) in USL Championship Playoffs)	0	30	9
LA Galaxy II	2020	USLC	1	2	—		—		—		1	2
LA Galaxy II	Total		30	11	0	0	0	0	1	0	31	11
LA Galaxy	2019	MLS	0	0	0	0	1 (Note: Appearance(s) in Leagues Cup)	0	—		1	0
LA Galaxy	2020	MLS	4	1	—		—		—		4	1
LA Galaxy	Total		4	1	0	0	1	0	0	0	5	1
Career total			91	17	0	0	1	0	1	0	93	17
