= Alejandro Alvarado Jr. =

American soccer player (born 2003)

- Alvarado Jr. with San Diego FC in 2026

Personal information
- Full name: Alejandro Alvarado Jr.
- Date of birth: July 29, 2003 (age 23)
- Place of birth: Los Angeles, California, United States
- Height: 1.78 m (5 ft 10 in)
- Position: Midfielder

Team information
- Current team: San Diego FC
- Number: 70

Youth career
- 2016–2021: LA Galaxy

Senior career*
Years	Team	Apps	(Gls)
2020–2021	LA Galaxy II	12	(1)
2021–2025	Vizela	9	(0)
2023–2024	→ Vianense (loan)	10	(0)
2025–	San Diego FC	12	(0)

International career^{‡}
2022–2023	United States U20	9	(1)
- * Club domestic league appearances and goals as of October 22, 2025 ‡ National team caps and goals as of August 31, 2023

Alejandro Alvarado Jr. (born July 29, 2003) is an American professional soccer player who plays as a midfielder for Major League Soccer club San Diego FC.

== Club career ==
=== LA Galaxy II ===
Alvarado made his league debut for the club on 20 July 2020, coming on as an 88th-minute substitute for Omar Ontiveros in a 1–0 away victory over the San Diego Loyal.

=== Vizela ===
On 6 September 2021, recently promoted to the Portuguese Primeira Liga side Vizela announced the signing of Alvarado on a five-year contract.

Alvarado made his debut for Vizela on 20 November 2021, starting in a 2–0 home win over Estrela da Amadora in the Taça de Portugal. He made his Primeira Liga debut a month later, on 28 December, coming off the bench in the final minutes of a 2–0 defeat away at Marítimo.

==== Vianense (loan) ====
On 30 August 2023, Vizela sent Alvarado on a season-long loan to Liga 3 side Vianense.

=== San Diego FC ===
On January 14, 2025, Alvarado returned to the United States, signing a two-year deal with San Diego FC ahead of their inaugural season.

== Personal life ==
Born in the United States, Alvarado is of Mexican descent.

== Career statistics ==
=== Club ===
As of March 17, 2024

Appearances and goals by club, season and competition
Club	Season	League			National cup		League cup		Other		Total	
Club	Season	Division	Apps	Goals	Apps	Goals	Apps	Goals	Apps	Goals	Apps	Goals
LA Galaxy II	2020	USL Championship	12	1	—		—		1 (Note: Appearance in USL Championship play-offs)	0	13	1
Vizela	2021–22	Primeira Liga	4	0	1	0	—		—		5	0
Vizela	2022–23	Primeira Liga	5	0	—		1	0	—		6	0
Vizela	Total		9	0	1	0	1	0	0	0	11	0
Vianense (loan)	2023–24	Liga 3	8	0	2	2	—		0	0	10	2
Career total			29	1	3	2	1	0	1	0	34	3

== Honors ==
United States U20

- CONCACAF U-20 Championship: 2022
