= Diedie Traore =

French footballer (born 1999)

Personal information
- Full name: Diedie Traore
- Date of birth: 15 January 1999 (age 27)
- Place of birth: Paris, France
- Height: 1.83 m (6 ft 0 in)
- Position: Defender

Youth career
- –2016: Metz

Senior career*
| Years | Team | Apps | (Gls) |
| 2017 | Utenis Utena | 15 | (1) |
| 2018–2020 | LA Galaxy II | 18 | (1) |
| 2019–2021 | LA Galaxy | 10 | (0) |
| 2021–2022 | SAS Épinal | 2 | (0) |
| 2022 | San Antonio FC | 11 | (0) |
| 2023 | Sporting Kansas City II | 1 | (0) |
| 2023 | La Louvière Centre | 4 | (0) |
- * Club domestic league appearances and goals as of 15:30, 15 July 2024 (UTC)

Diedie Traore (born 15 January 1999) is a French footballer.

== Career ==
Traore began his youth career with the Metz academy, before leaving in 2016. He joined Lithuanian A Lyga side Utenis Utena during the summer break in 2017. In January 2018, Traore attended an open tryout for United Soccer League club LA Galaxy II. After a successful trial, he signed with the team on 30 April 2018.

On 6 March 2019, Traore moved up to the senior LA Galaxy side.

On 5 March 2021, Traore and LA Galaxy mutually agreed to part ways.

Traore returned to France, signing with Championnat National 2 side SAS Épinal in November 2021.

On 24 February 2022 it was announced that Traore had signed with USL Championship side San Antonio FC. On 30 June 2022 the club announced it had reached a mutual agreement with the player to terminate his contract.

In September 2023, Diedie joined Belgian fourth tier club UR La Louvière Centre in the Belgian Division 2.

== Personal life ==
Born in France, Traore is of Malian descent.

== Career statistics ==
=== Club ===
As of match played 29 October 2020

Appearances and goals by club, season and competition
| Club | Season | League | | | National Cup | | Continental | | Other | | Total | |
| Club | Season | Division | Apps | Goals | Apps | Goals | Apps | Goals | Apps | Goals | Apps | Goals |
|---|---|---|---|---|---|---|---|---|---|---|---|---|
| Utenis Utena | 2017 | A Lyga | 15 | 1 | — | | — | | — | | 15 | 1 |
| LA Galaxy II | 2018 | USLC | 13 | 0 | — | | — | | — | | 13 | 0 |
| LA Galaxy II | 2019 | USLC | 4 | 1 | — | | — | | — | | 4 | 1 |
| LA Galaxy II | 2020 | USLC | 1 | 0 | — | | — | | — | | 1 | 0 |
| LA Galaxy II | Total | | 18 | 1 | 0 | 0 | 0 | 0 | 0 | 0 | 18 | 1 |
| LA Galaxy | 2019 | MLS | 4 | 0 | 1 | 0 | 0 (Note: Appearance(s) in Leagues Cup) | 0 | 0 (Note: Appearance(s) in MLS Cup Playoffs) | 0 | 5 | 0 |
| LA Galaxy | 2020 | MLS | 6 | 0 | — | | — | | — | | 6 | 0 |
| LA Galaxy | Total | | 10 | 0 | 1 | 0 | 0 | 0 | 0 | 0 | 11 | 0 |
| Career total | | | 43 | 2 | 1 | 0 | 0 | 0 | 0 | 0 | 44 | 2 |
