= Giancarlo González =

Costa Rican footballer (born 1988)

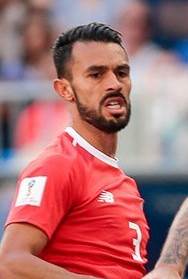
- González with Costa Rica at the 2018 FIFA World Cup

Personal information
- Full name: Giancarlo González Castro
- Date of birth: 8 February 1988 (age 38)
- Place of birth: Desamparados, San José, Costa Rica
- Height: 1.86 m (6 ft 1 in)
- Position: Centre-back

Team information
- Current team: Alajuelense
- Number: 3

Youth career
- 2004–2006: Alajuelense

Senior career*
Years	Team	Apps	(Gls)
2009–2012	Alajuelense	91	(6)
2012–2013	Vålerenga	37	(2)
2014	Columbus Crew	17	(1)
2014–2017	Palermo	84	(4)
2017–2019	Bologna	34	(0)
2019–2021	LA Galaxy	30	(2)
2021	→ Alajuelense (loan)	17	(1)
2022–2023	Alajuelense	55	(4)
2024–2026	Sporting San José	83	(14)
2026–	Alajuelense	1	(0)

International career^{‡}
2007–2008	Costa Rica U20	2	(0)
2010–	Costa Rica	90	(2)
- * Club domestic league appearances and goals as of 2 May 2025 ‡ National team caps and goals as of 20 November 2023

Giancarlo "Pipo" González Castro (born 8 February 1988) is a Costa Rican professional footballer who plays as a centre-back for Liga FPD club Alajuelense and the Costa Rica national team.

== Club career ==
=== Early career ===
González spent his youth career with Alajuelense, apart from a stint with Saprissa when he was between 12 and 14 years of age. He began his professional career with Alajuelense in 2007 and was a key player in helping his club win three league titles.

González joined Norwegian club Vålerenga after his contract expired on 31 July 2012. During his time at Vålerenga, González appeared in 37 league matches and scored two goals.

=== Columbus Crew ===
On 21 February 2014, González signed with Major League Soccer side Columbus Crew. On 15 April 2014, the MLS Disciplinary Committee fined González an undisclosed amount for "embellishment" of an incident in the 92nd minute of the game against the San Jose Earthquakes on 13 April. González was also nominated for the satirical "Fallon d'Floor" award for this effort.

=== Palermo ===
After his performances at the 2014 FIFA World Cup, González received interest from a number of European clubs, and on 26 August 2014 Palermo of Italy's Serie A confirmed they had signed him on a three-year deal. The transfer fee was reported to be $5 million, with 5% of the fee being distributed among González's youth clubs Alajuelense and Saprissa as per the FIFA solidarity contribution rules. He made his debut on 19 October 2014 in a home game against Cesena, playing the full 90 minutes and scoring the winning goal in the first minute of injury time.

Palermo's 2016–17 season ended in relegation from Serie A, with González making 21 appearances.

=== Bologna ===
On 22 June 2017, Bologna announced the signing of González.

=== LA Galaxy ===
On 11 April 2019, González signed with the LA Galaxy.

== International career ==
González played at the 2007 FIFA U-20 World Cup held in Canada.

Nicknamed Pipo, he made his senior international debut for Costa Rica in a friendly against Slovakia on 5 June 2010. In January 2013, he scored the lone goal in a 1–0 victory over Honduras in the 2013 Copa Centroamericana final.

=== 2014 World Cup ===
In June 2014, González was named in Costa Rica's squad for the 2014 FIFA World Cup. In the team's first two group matches, he and his central defensive colleagues Michael Umaña and Óscar Duarte allowed only one goal as Los Ticos beat Uruguay (3–1) and Italy (1–0) to qualify for the knockout stage. Costa Rica completed the group stage unbeaten, recording a second consecutive shutout in a 0–0 draw with England in Belo Horizonte. González's play at the back was listed by several as key to the team's progression from the group stage. His countless interceptions and tackles led to him being named to the ESPN Best XI of the group stage. During the round of 16, González was the third of five Costa Rican players to successfully convert his kick in a 5–3 penalty shootout defeat of Greece. He was included in the BBC's team of the tournament.

=== 2018 World Cup ===
In May 2018 he was named in Costa Rica's 23 man squad for the 2018 FIFA World Cup in Russia.

== Personal life ==
González is of Spanish origin. He is a son of Roberto González and Elsa Castro and has a sister and brother. He has a son.

== Career statistics ==
=== Club ===
As of match played 5 November 2020

Appearances and goals by club, season and competition
Club	Season	League			Cup		Continental		Playoffs		Total	
Club	Season	Division	Apps	Goals	Apps	Goals	Apps	Goals	Apps	Goals	Apps	Goals
Alajuelense	2008–09	Costa Rican Primera División					2	0			2	
Alajuelense	2009–10	Costa Rican Primera División	28	3							28	3
Alajuelense	2010–11	Costa Rican Primera División	34	0			0	0	0	0	34	0
Alajuelense	2011–12	Costa Rican Primera División	29	3			6	0	0	0	35	3
Alajuelense	Total		91	6	0	0	8	0	0	0	99	6
Vålerenga	2012	Tippeligaen	12	0	—		—		—		12	0
Vålerenga	2013	Tippeligaen	25	2	4	0	—		—		29	2
Vålerenga	Total		37	2	4	0	0	0	0	0	41	2
Columbus Crew	2014	Major League Soccer	17	1	—		—		—		17	1
Palermo	2014–15	Serie A	28	1	—		—		—		28	1
Palermo	2015–16	Serie A	35	2	1	0	—		—		36	1
Palermo	2016–17	Serie A	21	1	0	0	—		—		21	1
Palermo	Total		84	4	1	0	0	0	0	0	85	4
Bologna	2017–18	Serie A	22	0	1	0	—		—		23	0
Bologna	2018–19	Serie A	12	0	1	0	—		—		13	0
Bologna	Total		34	0	2	0	0	0	0	0	36	0
LA Galaxy	2019	Major League Soccer	20	1	0	0	2	0	2	0	24	1
LA Galaxy	2020	Major League Soccer	10	1	0	0	—		0	0	10	1
LA Galaxy	Total		30	2	0	0	2	0	2	0	34	2
Career total			293	15	7	0	10	0	2	0	312	15

=== International ===
As of match played 20 November 2023

Appearances and goals by national team and year
National team	Year	Apps	Goals
Costa Rica	2010	3	0
Costa Rica	2011	1	0
Costa Rica	2012	9	1
Costa Rica	2013	19	1
Costa Rica	2014	9	0
Costa Rica	2015	10	0
Costa Rica	2016	3	0
Costa Rica	2017	12	0
Costa Rica	2018	11	0
Costa Rica	2019	5	0
Costa Rica	2020	1	0
Costa Rica	2021	5	0
Costa Rica	2022	0	0
Costa Rica	2023	2	0
Total		90	2

Scores and results list Costa Rica's goal tally first, score column indicates score after each González goal.

List of international goals scored by Giancarlo González
No.	Date	Venue	Opponent	Score	Result	Competition
1	25 May 2012	Estadio Nacional, San José, Costa Rica	Guatemala	3–2	3–2	Friendly
2	27 January 2013	Estadio Nacional, San José, Costa Rica	Honduras	1–0	1–0	2013 Copa Centroamericana

== Honours ==
Alajuelense

- Liga FPD: Apertura 2010, Clausura 2011, Apertura 2011

Costa Rica

- Copa Centroamericana: 2013

Individual

- CONCACAF Best XI: 2015
