= Sebastian Nava =

American soccer player (born 2003)

Personal information
- Date of birth: March 10, 2003 (age 23)
- Place of birth: Wilmington, California, United States
- Height: 1.73 m (5 ft 8 in)
- Position: Forward

Team information
- Current team: Los Angeles FC 2
- Number: 40

Youth career
- 2016–2020: LA Galaxy

College career
Years	Team	Apps	(Gls)
2021–2024	Portland Pilots	10	(2)

Senior career*
Years	Team	Apps	(Gls)
2020–2021	LA Galaxy II	21	(0)
2025–	Los Angeles FC 2	0	(0)
- * Club domestic league appearances and goals as of February 12, 2026

Sebastian Nava (born March 10, 2003) is an American soccer player who plays as a forward for MLS Next Pro club Los Angeles FC 2.

== Career ==
=== LA Galaxy II ===
As a member of the LA Galaxy youth academy, Nava appeared for the club's USL Championship affiliate LA Galaxy II during the 2020 and 2021 seasons. He made his professional debut on July 11, 2020, in a 4–0 defeat to the Phoenix Rising.

=== College ===
In September 2020, Nava committed to play at the University of Portland beginning in the fall of 2021.

== Career statistics ==
=== Club ===
As of match played May 10, 2021

Appearances and goals by club, season and competition
Club	Season	League			Cup		Other (Note: Includes appearances in the USL Championship playoffs)		Total	
Club	Season	Division	Apps	Goals	Apps	Goals	Apps	Goals	Apps	Goals
LA Galaxy II	2020	USL Championship	14	0	—	—	1	0	15	0
LA Galaxy II	2021	USL Championship	3	0	—	—	—	—	3	0
Career total			17	0	—	—	1	0	18	0
