= Rolf Feltscher =

Venezuelan footballer (born 1990)

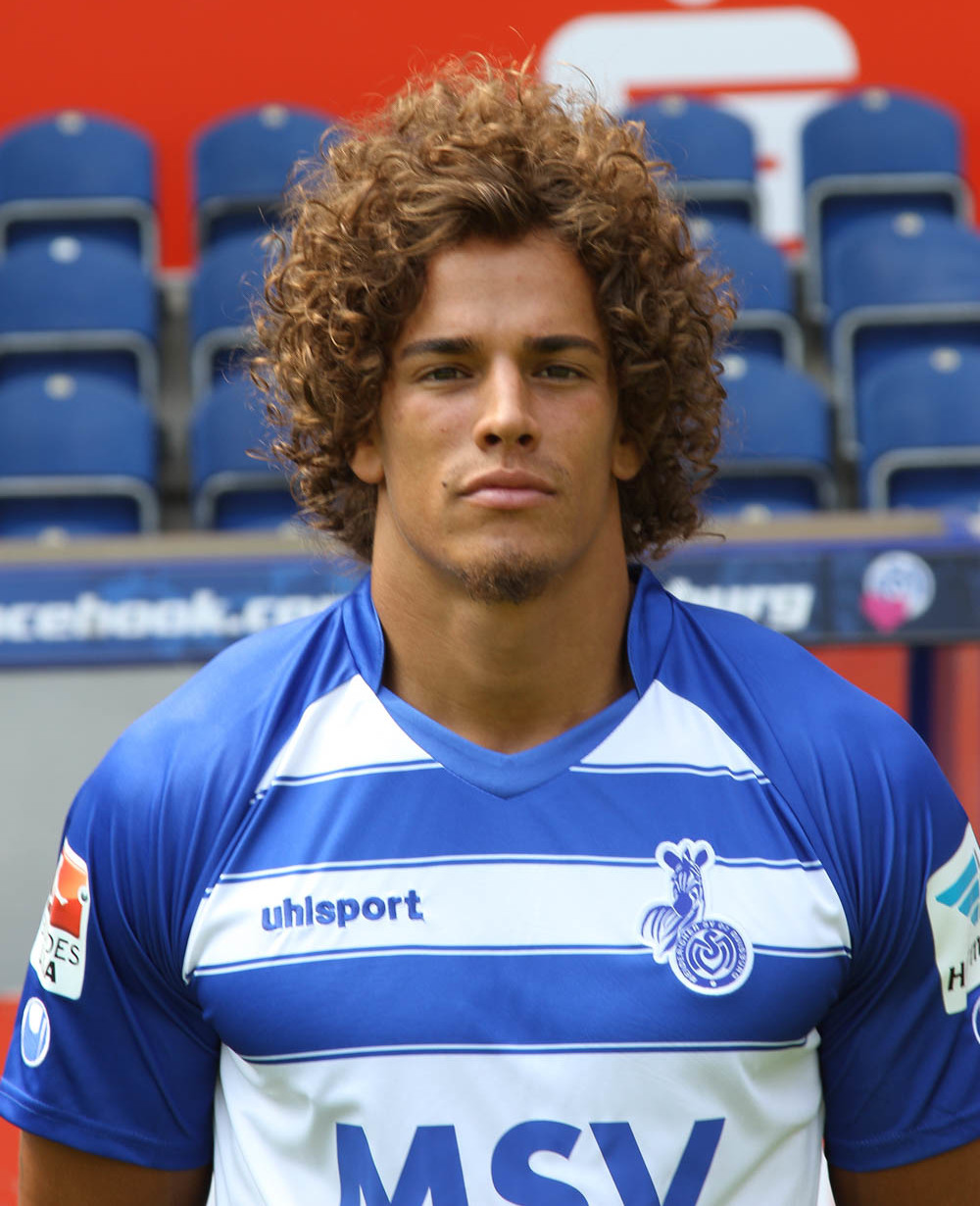
- Feltscher with MSV Duisburg in 2015

Personal information
- Full name: Rolf Günther Feltscher Martínez
- Date of birth: 6 October 1990 (age 36)
- Place of birth: Bülach, Switzerland
- Height: 1.84 m (6 ft 0 in)
- Position: Defender

Youth career
- 2001–2007: Grasshoppers

Senior career*
Years	Team	Apps	(Gls)
2007–2010	Grasshoppers	63	(0)
2010–2013	Parma	7	(0)
2012	→ Padova (loan)	6	(0)
2013	→ Grosseto (loan)	15	(0)
2013–2014	Lausanne-Sport	8	(0)
2014–2016	MSV Duisburg	53	(2)
2016–2017	Getafe	7	(0)
2017	→ Zaragoza (loan)	9	(0)
2017	Cardiff City	0	(0)
2018–2020	LA Galaxy	57	(2)
2020–2021	Würzburger Kickers	19	(0)
2021–2024	MSV Duisburg	69	(2)

International career^{‡}
2008–2009	Switzerland U19	4	(0)
2008–2011	Switzerland U21	12	(0)
2011–2021	Venezuela	27	(0)
- * Club domestic league appearances and goals as of 11:04, 4 May 2024 (UTC) ‡ National team caps and goals as of 12:00, 18 July 2021 (UTC)

Rolf Günther Feltscher Martínez (born 6 October 1990) is a professional footballer who plays as defender. Born in Switzerland, he plays for the Venezuela national team.

== Club career ==
=== Grasshoppers ===
Despite being just 16 years old, he was given his league debut in Grasshoppers's first match of the 2007–08 season, a 2–0 victory over FC St. Gallen, playing 90 minutes at right back. He was also a key member of the Switzerland U-17 team during the qualifying round of the 2007 UEFA U-17 Championship, playing in all three matches during that round.

=== Parma ===
In November 2009, he signed a pre-contract with Parma and joined the Italian club after the end of season. He played for Parma's primavera in the 2011 edition of the Torneo di Viareggio, but made just two league starts and a substitute appearance for the first-team in his debut season. He made four appearances the following year.

=== Padova ===
In June 2012, Calcio Padova confirmed that Feltscher had signed on a loan deal from Parma with an option to buy for the year 2012–13.

=== Duisburg ===
He joined MSV Duisburg for the 2014–15 season.

=== Getafe ===
On 11 July 2016, Feltscher signed a two-year deal with Getafe CF in Segunda División. After being rarely used, he was loaned to fellow league team Real Zaragoza the following 31 January.

=== Cardiff City ===
In September 2017, Feltscher spent ten days on trial with EFL Championship side Birmingham City, being told that a potential permanent deal was "on the table". However, after Birmingham manager Harry Redknapp left his position, he was allowed to leave the club. Redknapp later recommended Feltscher to Neil Warnock, manager of fellow Championship club Cardiff City, and he spent several weeks on trial with Cardiff before signing an initial two-month contract on 16 November 2017. During his time at the club, he featured as unused substitute in two league matches but did not make a first-team appearance.

=== LA Galaxy ===
On 19 December 2017, Feltscher signed with Major League Soccer side LA Galaxy ahead of their 2018 season. He had seven games and seven starts until in April 2018 he was ruled out for four months with a broken shoulder. Feltscher was released by LA Galaxy at the end of their 2018 season. He was re-signed on 15 January 2019.

=== Würzburger Kickers ===
On 23 December 2020, Feltscher returned to Germany joining 2. Bundesliga side Würzburger Kickers.

=== Return to Duisburg ===
In June 2021, he signed for Duisburg, for the second time.

== Personal life ==
He is the younger brother of Frank Feltscher and the elder step-brother of Mattia Desole.

== Career statistics ==
=== Club ===
As of 3 May 2024

Appearances and goals by club, season and competition
Club	Season	Division	League		Cup		Continental		Other		Total	
Club	Season	Division	Apps	Goals	Apps	Goals	Apps	Goals	Apps	Goals	Apps	Goals
Grasshopper Club Zürich	2007–08	Swiss Super League	21	0	—		—		—		21	0
Grasshopper Club Zürich	2008–09	Swiss Super League	21	0	—		1 (Note: Appearance in Europa League qualification)	0	1 (Note: Appearance in UI-Cup)	0	23	0
Grasshopper Club Zürich	2009–10	Swiss Super League	21	0	—		—		—		21	0
Grasshopper Club Zürich	Total		63	0	—		1	0	1	0	65	0
Parma	2010–11	Serie A	3	0	—		—		—		3	0
Parma	2011–12	Serie A	4	0	1	0	—		—		5	0
Parma	Total		7	0	1	0	—		—		8	0
Calcio Padova (loan)	2012–13	Serie B	6	0	—		—		—		6	0
Grosseto 1912 (loan)	2012–13	Serie B	15	0	—		—		—		15	0
Lausanne-Sport	2013–14	Swiss Super League	8	0	—		—		—		8	0
MSV Duisburg	2014–15	3. Liga	26	0	1	0	—		—		27	0
MSV Duisburg	2015–16	2. Bundesliga	27	2	1	0	—		1 (Note: Appearance in relegation playoff)	0	30	2
MSV Duisburg	Total		53	2	2	0	—		1	0	56	2
Getafe	2016–17	Segunda División	7	0	—		—		—		7	0
Real Zaragoza (loan)	2016–17	Segunda División	9	0	—		—		—		9	0
Cardiff City	2017–18	EFL Championship	0	0	—		—		—		0	0
LA Galaxy	2018	MLS	15	1	—		—		—		15	1
LA Galaxy	2019	MLS	25	1	—		—		1 (Note: Appearance in playoffs)	1	26	2
LA Galaxy	2020	MLS	17	0	—		—		—		17	0
LA Galaxy	Total		57	2	—		—		1	1	58	3
Würzburger Kickers	2020–21	2. Bundesliga	19	0	—		—		—		19	0
MSV Duisburg	2021–22	3. Liga	28	0	—		—		—		28	0
MSV Duisburg	2022–23	3. Liga	17	2	—		—		—		17	2
MSV Duisburg	2023–24	3. Liga	24	0	—		—		—		24	0
MSV Duisburg	Total		69	2	0	0	—		—		69	2
Career total			313	6	3	0	1	0	3	1	320	7

=== International ===
As of match played 18 July 2021

Appearances and goals by national team and year
National team	Year	Apps	Goals
Venezuela	2011	1	0
Venezuela	2012	3	0
Venezuela	2013	2	0
Venezuela	2016	8	0
Venezuela	2017	5	0
Venezuela	2018	1	0
Venezuela	2019	3	0
Venezuela	2020	3	0
Venezuela	2021	1	0
Total		27	0
