= Nick DePuy =

American soccer player

Personal information
- Full name: Nicholas Brady DePuy
- Date of birth: November 14, 1994 (age 31)
- Place of birth: Irvine, California, United States
- Height: 6 ft 5 in (1.96 m)
- Position: Defender

Youth career
- 2009–2010: Strikers FC
- 2010–2013: Real Colorado

College career
Years	Team	Apps	(Gls)
2013–2016	UC Santa Barbara Gauchos	83	(31)

Senior career*
Years	Team	Apps	(Gls)
2014–2015	Ventura County Fusion	5	(0)
2017–2018	Montreal Impact	5	(0)
2017	→ Ottawa Fury (loan)	8	(2)
2018	→ Fremad Amager (loan)	6	(0)
2019	LA Galaxy II	26	(2)
2019–2022	LA Galaxy	59	(0)
2023	Nashville SC	0	(0)
2024	Huntsville City	4	(0)
2024	→ Memphis 901 (loan)	2	(0)
- * Club domestic league appearances and goals as of September 14, 2024

Nicholas "Nick" Brady DePuy (born November 14, 1994) is an American professional soccer player who plays as a defender.

== Early life and education ==
DePuy played four years of college soccer at UC Santa Barbara between 2013 and 2016, where in 2016 he was named NSCAA Second Team All-Far West Region, Big West Conference Offensive Player of the Year and First Team All-Big West Conference.

While at college, DePuy also played with USL PDL sides Ventura County Fusion.

== Playing career ==
DePuy was selected in the first round (19th overall) of the 2017 MLS SuperDraft by Montreal Impact.

DePuy made his professional debut on March 4, 2017, as an 83rd-minute substitute during a 1–0 loss to San Jose Earthquakes. It was announced in May 2017 that he was loaned to the Impact's United Soccer League affiliate, Ottawa Fury FC.

On January 31, 2018, DePuy was loaned out to Fremad Amager in the Danish 1st Division for the rest of the season. The journey only lasted until April 14, 2018, before he picked up an injury and was recalled by Montreal.

On August 16, 2018, DePuy was waived by Montreal.

On March 8, 2019, he signed with the LA Galaxy II.

DePuy appeared on the bench for LA Galaxy's first-team on July 23, 2019, during a 2019 Leagues Cup fixture against Club Tijuana.

On February 5, 2020, DePuy made the move to LA Galaxy's senior team roster.

== Career statistics ==
=== Club ===
As of match played October 29, 2020

Appearances and goals by club, season and competition
Club	Season	League			National cup		Continental		Total	
Club	Season	Division	Apps	Goals	Apps	Goals	Apps	Goals	Apps	Goals
Ventura County Fusion	2014	USL PDL	3	0	—		—		3	0
Ventura County Fusion	2015	USL PDL	2	0	—		—		2	0
Ventura County Fusion	Total		5	0	0	0	0	0	5	0
Montreal Impact	2017	MLS	5	0	1	0	—		6	0
Montreal Impact	2018	MLS	0	0	—		—		0	0
Montreal Impact	Total		5	0	1	0	0	0	6	0
Ottawa Fury (loan)	2017	USLC	8	2	—		—		8	2
Fremad Amager(loan)	2017–18	Danish 1st Division	6	0	—		—		6	0
LA Galaxy II	2019	USLC	26	2	—		—		26	2
LA Galaxy	2019	MLS	0	0	—		1 (Note: Appearance(s) in Leagues Cup)	0	1	0
LA Galaxy	2020	MLS	16	0	—		—		16	0
LA Galaxy	Total		16	0	1	0	1	0	17	0
Career total			66	4	1	0	1	0	68	4
