= Geoffrey Acheampong =

Ghanaian footballer (born 1997)

Personal information
- Full name: Geoffrey Edwin Acheampong
- Date of birth: January 28, 1997 (age 29)
- Place of birth: Sunyani, Ghana
- Height: 5 ft 11 in (1.80 m)
- Position: Midfielder

Team information
- Current team: Birkirkara
- Number: 33

Youth career
- Cate School

College career
Years	Team	Apps	(Gls)
2015	UC Santa Barbara Gauchos	22	(3)

Senior career*
Years	Team	Apps	(Gls)
2016–2017	Bastia	2	(0)
2016–2017	→ Bastia II (loan)	11	(1)
2017	Veracruz	0	(0)
2018–2019	LA Galaxy II	36	(5)
2020	AC Kajaani	17	(7)
2021	Elmina Sharks	15	(0)
2021	RoPS	14	(3)
2022	Mosta FC	25	(2)
2023–2025	Sliema Wanderers	49	(10)
2025–	Birkirkara	27	(0)
- * Club domestic league appearances and goals as of 18 May 2026

Geoffrey Edwin Acheampong (born January 28, 1997) is a Ghanaian professional footballer who currently plays for Birkirkara in the Maltese Premier League.

== Early life and education ==
Acheampong was born in Sunyani, Ghana, on January 28, 1997, to Alice and Henry Acheampong. He was a part of the Right to Dream Academy and would ultimately move to the United States. He played high school soccer at Cate School in Carpinteria, California, and made worldwide headlines with a goal scored from a distance of 60 yards.

A highly touted prep, Acheampong was rated as the 24th-best collegiate soccer prospect in the class of 2015. He continued his soccer career and announced his intention to enroll at the University of California, Santa Barbara. In his only year with the Gauchos, Acheampong made 22 appearances and scored 3 goals. Playing alongside Nick DePuy, the 10 assists he recorded were the highest on the team. The Big West Conference announced Acheampong as the 2015 Freshman of the Year. Despite having played only one year, he was already being highly considered as a top Major League Soccer prospect. He left school after his first season with the Gauchos to pursue a professional soccer career.

== Professional career ==
In June 2016, it was announced that Acheampong had signed with SC Bastia of Ligue 1. On September 18, 2016, Acheampong made his professional debut upon entering as a substitute for Allan Saint-Maximin in a match against AS Saint-Étienne.

Acheampong signed with Veracruz for the 2017–18 Liga MX season.

On March 1, 2018, it was announced that Acheampong had signed with LA Galaxy II.

In June 2020, Acheampong moved to Finnish Ykkönen side AC Kajaani. He made his debut for Kajaani on 27 June 2020 against FF Jaro, where he scored both goals in a 2–2 draw.

In March 2021, Acheampong signed with Ghana Premier League side Elmina Sharks as a free agent.

In July 2021, Acheampong returned to Finland for Veikkausliiga club Rovaniemen Palloseura.

In 2022, Acheampong continued his journey in Malta and spent one season with Mosta F.C. before joining Sliema Wanderers F.C. He was named MFPA Men's Best XI following the 2023–24 Maltese Premier League season.

== Awards and honors ==
Club

- Maltese FA Trophy: 2024

Individual

- Big West Conference Freshman of the Year: 2015
- Vuoden jalkapalloälykkö: 2021
