= Diego Polenta =

Uruguayan footballer (born 1992)

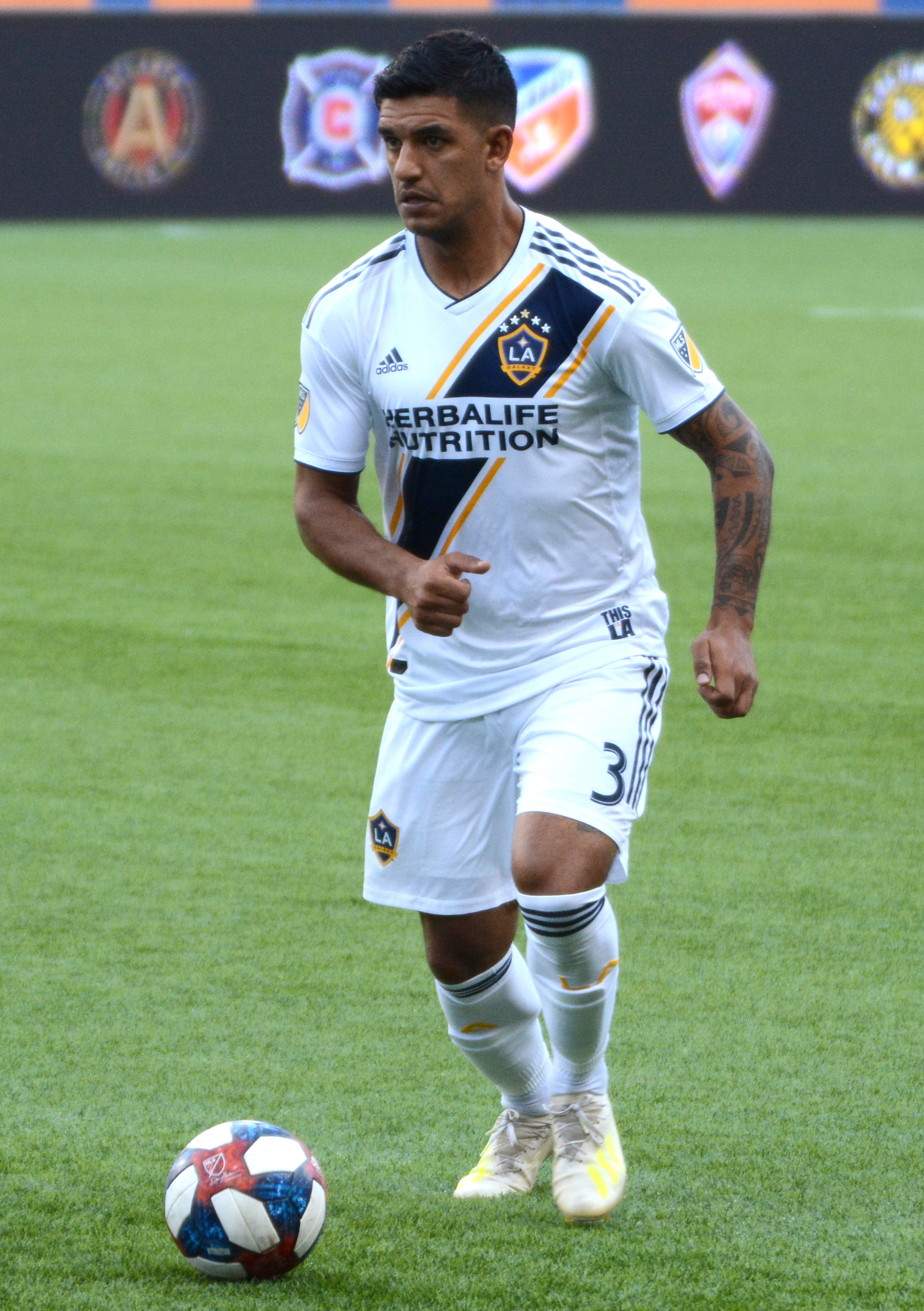
- Polenta with LA Galaxy in 2019

Personal information
- Full name: Diego Fabián Polenta Musetti
- Date of birth: 6 February 1992 (age 34)
- Place of birth: Montevideo, Uruguay
- Height: 1.85 m (6 ft 1 in)
- Position: Centre-back

Youth career
- Danubio
- 2008–2011: Genoa

Senior career*
Years	Team	Apps	(Gls)
2011–2015	Genoa	1	(0)
2011–2014	→ Bari (loan)	86	(5)
2014–2015	→ Nacional (loan)	28	(0)
2015–2018	Nacional	108	(7)
2019–2020	LA Galaxy	32	(1)
2020–2021	Olimpia	25	(1)
2021–2022	Nacional	14	(0)
2022–2023	Cerro Largo	0	(0)
2022	→ Unión (loan)	38	(2)
2023–2025	Nacional	28	(2)

International career
2007	Uruguay U15	12	(3)
2008–2009	Uruguay U17	20	(0)
2011	Uruguay U20	16	(3)
2012	Uruguay Olympic	1	(0)
- * Club domestic league appearances and goals as of 16 October 2023

Diego Fabián Polenta Musetti (Spanish pronunciation: [ˈdjeɣo poˈlenta]; born 6 February 1992) is a Uruguayan former professional footballer who played as a centre-back.

Polenta has been named in Uruguay's senior team several times, but remained uncapped.

== Club career ==
=== Early career ===
Born in Montevideo, Uruguay, Polenta started his career at his hometown club Danubio, in youth categories. His abilities impressed the Italian club Genoa, and he was moved to the club in July 2008.

=== Genoa C.F.C. ===
He spent the whole 2009-10 season with the Primavera team. In the 2010-11 season he was included on the first team squad, with the 35 jersey.

On 30 April 2011, he made his first team debut, against Napoli, after came off the bench to replace Giandomenico Mesto.

=== A.S. Bari ===
On 29 August 2011, he signed a season-long loan deal with the Serie B club Bari in order to gain first team football experience. After a successful stay that loan deal was extended by one year on 21 August 2012. He stayed with Bari until 2014.

=== Nacional ===
In 2014 he joined Uruguayan side Nacional originally on loan, winning the Uruguayan Primera División during 2014–15. Where he won Defensive Player Of The Year award for the Uruguayan Primera División. He won his second title in 2016, with the Nacional winning the 2016 Uruguayan Primera División.

He subsequently became the Captain of Nacional. In July 2017 he won the Torneo Intermedio Final.

In July 2018, with Polenta's contract expiring at Nacional at the end of June 2018, Spanish Newspaper El País, reported that Polenta had received contract offers from Mexican side Club Atlas, Saudi Arabian side Al-Ittihad and English side Leeds United, with the player taking time to consider the proposals.

=== LA Galaxy ===
On 7 February 2019, Polenta joined MLS club LA Galaxy. On April 19 he scored his first goal for the club, a late winner against Houston Dynamo.

On 4 March 2025, Polenta officially announced his retirement from professional football.

== International career ==
He has been capped by the Uruguay national under-17 football team for the 2009 FIFA U-17 World Cup and by the Uruguay national under-20 football team for the 2011 South American Youth Championship and for the 2011 FIFA U-20 World Cup, he captained Uruguay at youth level, he was also named by Manager Óscar Tabárez in the Uruguay U23's for the Uruguay Olympic football team at the 2012 Summer Olympics in London, where he played in one game.

He was called up to the Uruguay squad for friendlies against Republic of Ireland and Estonia. Polenta was named in Uruguay's senior squad for a 2018 FIFA World Cup qualifier against Peru in March 2016.

== Style Of Play ==
Mainly a centre back, he can also operate as a left back.

=== U20 International goals ===
No.	Date	Venue	Opponent	Score	Result	Competition	Ref.
1.	16 January 2011	Estadio Monumental Virgen de Chapi, Arequipa, Peru	Argentina	0–1	2–1	2011 South American Youth Championship	
2.	22 January 2011	Estadio Monumental Virgen de Chapi, Arequipa, Peru	Chile	0–4	0–4	2011 South American Youth Championship	
3.	13 July 2011	Estadio Juan Antonio Lavalleja, Flores, Uruguay	Guatemala	2–0	2–0	Friendly	

== Honours ==
Nacional

Club

- Uruguayan Primera División: 2014–15
- Uruguayan Primera División: 2016
- 2017 Intermedio Final Winner

Individual

- 2014–15 Uruguayan Primera División season: Defensive Player Of The Year Award
