= Justin Fiddes =

American soccer player

Personal information
- Date of birth: January 3, 1996 (age 30)
- Place of birth: Atlanta, Georgia, U.S.
- Height: 1.80 m (5 ft 11 in)
- Position: Left back

Youth career
- 2003–2011: San Diego Surf Soccer Club
- 2011: IMG Academy

College career
Years	Team	Apps	(Gls)
2014–2017	Washington Huskies	70	(1)

Senior career*
Years	Team	Apps	(Gls)
2015	Puget Sound Gunners	2	(0)
2016	San Diego Zest	0	(0)
2017	SoCal Surf	3	(0)
2018	Vancouver Whitecaps FC	0	(0)
2018	→ Fresno FC (loan)	3	(0)
2018–2019	LA Galaxy II	25	(0)
- * Club domestic league appearances and goals as of October 25, 2019

Justin Fiddes (born January 3, 1996) is an American former soccer player.

== Career ==
=== College ===
Fiddes played four years of college soccer at the University of Washington between 2014 and 2017. During his time at Washington, Fiddes was named Second Team All Far-West Region, and received an Honorable Mention All-Pac-12 Conference honors following his senior season.

While at college, Fiddes spent time with Premier Development League sides Puget Sound Gunners, San Diego Zest and SoCal Surf.

=== Professional ===
On January 17, 2018, Fiddes was selected 17th overall in the 2018 MLS SuperDraft by Vancouver Whitecaps FC. He signed with the Whitecaps on March 8, 2018.

On May 1, 2018, Fiddes was loaned to Vancouver's United Soccer League affiliate Fresno FC for their 2018 season.

On July 2, 2018, Fiddes was waived by Vancouver.

On August 8, 2018, Fiddes signed with the LA Galaxy II.
