= Ernesto Walker =

Panamanian footballer (born 1999)

Personal information
- Full name: Ernesto Emanuel Walker Willis
- Date of birth: February 9, 1999 (age 27)
- Place of birth: Panama City, Panama
- Height: 1.89 m (6 ft 2 in)
- Position: Attacking midfielder

Team information
- Current team: Tauro

Senior career*
| Years | Team | Apps | (Gls) |
| 2017–2018 | CAI La Chorrera | 4 | (0) |
| 2018–2019 | Plaza Amador | 0 | (0) |
| 2019 | → LA Galaxy II (loan) | 10 | (1) |
| 2020– | Tauro | 12 | (0) |

International career^{‡}
| 2018 | Panama U20 | 6 | (2) |
| 2019– | Panama | 3 | (0) |
- * Club domestic league appearances and goals as of 12 January 2021 (UTC) ‡ National team caps and goals as of 08:10, 11 June 2020 (UTC)

Ernesto Emanuel Walker Willis (born February 9, 1999) is a Panamanian professional footballer who plays for Tauro FC.

== Club career ==
After beginning his career with CAI La Chorrera and moving to Plaza Amador in July 2018, Walker joined USL Championship side LA Galaxy II on 21 February 2019 for a season-long loan.

== International ==
He made his debut for Panama on 27 January 2019 in a friendly against the United States, as a starter.
