= 2020 Leagues Cup =

Tournament details
- Host countries: Canada; United States
- Dates: July 21 – September 16 (planned)
- Teams: 16 (from 3 (Note: Toronto FC is a member of the Canadian Soccer Association; however, their method of qualification for this competition is through the U.S.-sanctioned Major League Soccer.) associations)

The 2020 Leagues Cup was planned to be the second edition of the Leagues Cup organized by Major League Soccer and Liga MX. The tournament would have featured 16 teams, an increase from the inaugural edition that had eight teams. Unlike the previous tournament, teams would have qualified based on league performance rather than by invitation.

Major League Soccer and Liga MX announced the cancelation of the tournament on May 19, 2020, due to the ongoing COVID-19 pandemic.

== Qualification ==
The top four Major League Soccer teams from each conference in the 2019 season who did not qualify for the 2020 CONCACAF Champions League would have qualified for the Leagues Cup.

The 2019 Apertura, 2020 Clausura, and 2019–20 Copa MX champions would have qualified for the Leagues Cup, plus the top five teams from the combined 2019–20 Liga MX standings who had not already qualified.

(United States) (Canada) Major League Soccer (8 berths)
Seed	Team	Qualification method
MLS 1	(United States) Philadelphia Union	3rd, Eastern Conference
MLS 2	(United States) Real Salt Lake	3rd, Western Conference
MLS 3	(United States) Minnesota United FC	4th, Western Conference
MLS 4	(United States) LA Galaxy	5th, Western Conference
MLS 5	(Canada) Toronto FC	4th, Eastern Conference
MLS 6	(United States) D.C. United	5th, Eastern Conference
MLS 7	(United States) Portland Timbers	6th, Western Conference
MLS 8	(United States) New York Red Bulls	6th, Eastern Conference

Mexican Football Federation (8 berths)
Seed	Team	Qualification method
LMX 1 or 2	Monterrey	2019 Apertura champions
LMX 1 or 2	Cruz Azul	2020 Clausura first place
LMX 3	Undetermined (Note: Monterrey had already qualified for the Leagues Cup prior to its cancellation, as the 2019 Liga MX Apertura champions. They later also won the 2019–20 Copa MX, but it is unclear how the Leagues Cup berth awarded to the Copa MX champions would have been reallocated.)	2019–20 Copa MX champions
LMX 4	León	1st, aggregate table
LMX 5	Santos Laguna	2nd, aggregate table
LMX 6	América	3rd, aggregate table
LMX 7	UANL	4th, aggregate table
LMX 8	Querétaro	5th, aggregate table

== Draw ==
The 2020 edition of the Leagues Cup was planned to be the first to use a draw and seeding for participating teams. The initial draw would have matched up an MLS team against a Liga MX team in the Round of 16, while a second draw before the quarterfinals would have allowed for reseeding and adjustments to allow for interleague play.

== Fixtures ==
=== Round of 16 ===
July 21/22	Philadelphia Union (United States)	v	(Mexico) TBD	Chester, Pennsylvania
				Stadium: Subaru Park

July 21/22	Toronto FC (Canada)	v	(Mexico) TBD	Toronto, Ontario
				Stadium: BMO Field

July 21/22	D.C. United (United States)	v	(Mexico) TBD	Washington, D.C.
				Stadium: Audi Field

July 21/22	New York Red Bulls (United States)	v	(Mexico) TBD	Harrison, New Jersey
				Stadium: Red Bull Arena

July 21/22	Real Salt Lake (United States)	v	(Mexico) TBD	Sandy, Utah
				Stadium: Rio Tinto Stadium

July 21/22	Minnesota United FC (United States)	v	(Mexico) TBD	St. Paul, Minnesota
				Stadium: Allianz Field

July 21/22	LA Galaxy (United States)	v	(Mexico) TBD	Carson, California
				Stadium: Dignity Health Sports Park

July 21/22	Portland Timbers (United States)	v	(Mexico) TBD	Portland, Oregon
				Stadium: Providence Park

=== Quarterfinals and beyond ===
The schedule for the final rounds of the tournament was originally as follows:

- Quarterfinals: August 4–5
- Semifinals: August 25–26
- Final: September 16
