= Abdalla Haji Shaibu =

Tanzanian footballer

Abdallah Haji
Personal information
- Full name: Abdallah Haji Shaibu
- Date of birth: 21 October 1998 (age 28)
- Place of birth: Zanzibar City, Tanzania
- Height: 1.88 m (6 ft 2 in)
- Position: Defender

Team information
- Current team: Young Africans
- Number: 23

Senior career*
Years	Team	Apps	(Gls)
2017–2019	Young Africans		
2019–2020	MFK Vyškov	0	(0)
2019	→ LA Galaxy II (loan)	1	(0)
2020–	Young Africans	0	(0)

International career
2017	Zanzibar	2	(0)
2018	Tanzania U23	2	(0)
- * Club domestic league appearances and goals as of 20 August 2019

Abdallah Haji Shaibu (born 21 October 1998), known as Abdallah Shaibu Ninja, is a Tanzanian football player who plays as a defender for Tanzanian Premier League club Young Africans SC and the Tanzania national team.
