= Omar Ontiveros =

American soccer player

Personal information
- Date of birth: May 15, 1995 (age 31)
- Place of birth: Pharr, Texas, United States
- Height: 1.88 m (6 ft 2 in)
- Position: Defender

Youth career
- 2014–2015: Santos Laguna

Senior career*
Years	Team	Apps	(Gls)
2015–2016	CS Grevenmacher	21	(1)
2017–2018	Rio Grande Valley FC	26	(2)
2019–2020	LA Galaxy II	33	(1)
- * Club domestic league appearances and goals as of September 25, 2020

Omar Ontiveros (born May 15, 1995) is an American soccer player who most recently played for LA Galaxy II of the USL Championship.

== Career ==
Ontiveros joined the under-20 side of Liga MX club Santos Laguna in November 2014, before heading to Luxembourg to play for side CS Grevenmacher.

Ontiveros signed with United Soccer League side Rio Grande Valley FC Toros on May 5, 2017.

On March 8, 2019, he signed with the LA Galaxy II.

== Controversy ==
On September 25, 2020, Ontiveros was initially suspended by the USL Championship for seven games after using a racial slur and receiving a red card in a league game against San Diego Loyal, he was eventually removed from the team.
