= Don Tchilao =

Beninese footballer

Personal information
- Full name: Armel Don Akla-Esso Tchilao
- Date of birth: August 20, 1996 (age 30)
- Place of birth: Benin
- Height: 1.84 m (6 ft 0 in)
- Positions: Midfielder; forward

College career
Years	Team	Apps	(Gls)
2015–2018	Oregon State Beavers	71	(12)

Senior career*
Years	Team	Apps	(Gls)
2017	San Diego Zest	3	(2)
2018	Portland Timbers U23s	5	(1)
2019	LA Galaxy II	18	(0)
2019	LA Galaxy	0	(0)
2020	San Diego 1904	2	(0)
- * Club domestic league appearances and goals as of April 22, 2022

Armel Don Akla-Esso Tchilao (born 20 August 1996) is a Beninese footballer who last played for San Diego 1904 FC in the National Independent Soccer Association.

== Career ==
=== College and amateur ===
Tchilao spent his entire college career at Oregon State University between 2015 and 2018.

Tchilao also played for Premier Development League sides San Diego Zest in 2017 and Portland Timbers U23s in 2018.

=== Professional ===
On January 11, 2019, Tchilao was selected in the second round (36th overall) of the 2019 MLS SuperDraft by LA Galaxy. He signed with LA Galaxy's USL Championship side LA Galaxy II on March 7, 2019.

Tchilao appeared for LA Galaxy's first-team on July 23, 2019, during a 2019 Leagues Cup fixture against Club Tijuana.

In February 2020, Tchilao was signed by San Diego 1904 FC of the National Independent Soccer Association.
