= Emil Cuello =

Argentine footballer (born 1997)

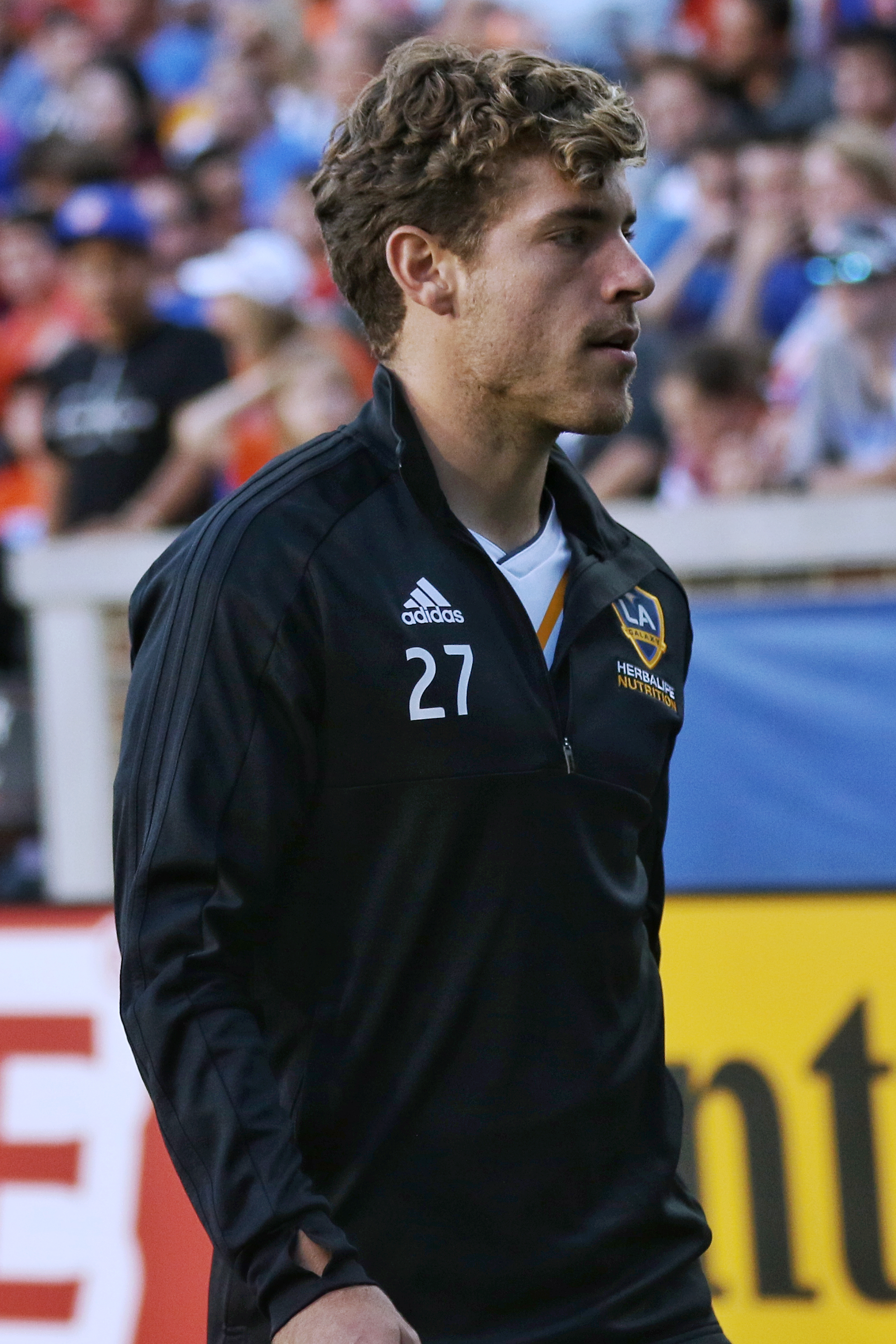
- Cuello in 2019

Personal information
- Date of birth: 2 January 1997 (age 29)
- Place of birth: Buenos Aires, Argentina
- Height: 1.80 m (5 ft 11 in)
- Positions: Left-back; midfielder; attacking midfielder

Team information
- Current team: San Antonio FC
- Number: 22

College career
Years	Team	Apps	(Gls)
2015–2018	SMU Mustangs	73	(12)

Senior career*
Years	Team	Apps	(Gls)
2016	Ocean City Nor'easters	2	(0)
2019–2020	LA Galaxy	20	(0)
2019–2020	LA Galaxy II	6	(1)
2021	San Antonio FC	16	(2)
2021	→ Sacramento Republic (loan)	14	(1)
2022	Sacramento Republic	22	(2)
2023–2025	Phoenix Rising	57	(2)
2026–	San Antonio FC	26	(4)
- * Club domestic league appearances and goals as of November 10, 2026

Emil Cuello (born 2 January 1997) is an Argentine professional footballer who plays as an attacking midfielder for San Antonio FC of the USL Championship.

== Early life ==
Cuello was born in Buenos Aires, Argentina, before his family moved to Orem, Utah, when he was five years old. He attended Orem High School, where he scored 23 goals in four seasons on the school's soccer team.

== Youth and college career ==
Cuello played four years of college soccer at Southern Methodist University between 2015 and 2018. During his time at SMU, Cuello made 73 appearances, scoring 12 goals and tallying 17 assists for the Mustangs. In his freshman year at SMU, Cuello earned American Athletic Conference (AAC) All-Rookie honors. As a junior, he was named the AAC Most Outstanding Offensive Player. His senior year, Cuello was recognized as AAC Tournament's Most Valuable Player and a first-team All-AAC selection.

While at college, Cuello also appeared for USL Premier Development League side Ocean City Nor'easters during their 2016 season.

== Club career ==
On 11 January 2019, Cuello was drafted 19th overall in the 2019 MLS SuperDraft by LA Galaxy. On 27 February 2019, Cuello signed for the club. After two seasons in Los Angeles, Cuello's contract option was declined by the club on 30 November 2020.

On 20 January 2021, Cuello signed with USL Championship side San Antonio FC. On 25 August 2021, Cuello was loaned to fellow USL side Sacramento Republic, with Mitchell Taintor heading in the other direction in a swap deal.

On 15 December 2021, it was announced Cuello would join Sacramento Republic on a permanent basis ahead of the 2022 season. Following the 2022 season he was released by Sacramento.

Cuello signed with Phoenix Rising FC on February 2, 2023.

On 17 February 2026, Cuello returned to San Antonio FC.
