= Iván Gutiérrez (footballer) =

Professional footballer (born 1998)

Personal information
- Full name: Iván Gutiérrez López
- Date of birth: 16 February 1998 (age 28)
- Place of birth: Riverside, California, United States
- Height: 1.71 m (5 ft 7 in)
- Position: Attacking midfielder

Youth career
- 2012–2016: Chivas USA
- 2016–2019: Guadalajara

Senior career*
Years	Team	Apps	(Gls)
2017–2019	Guadalajara Premier	33	(3)
2019–2020	LA Galaxy II	22	(2)
2021	Phoenix Rising	9	(0)
2022	Orange County SC	10	(0)
2022	Chattanooga Red Wolves	4	(0)

International career^{‡}
2015	Mexico U17	2	(0)
Medal record
Men's football
Representing Mexico
CONCACAF Under-17 Championship
First place	2015 Honduras	Team
- * Club domestic league appearances and goals as of 16 October 2022 ‡ National team caps and goals as of 28 July 2019

Iván Gutiérrez López (born 16 February 1998) is a professional footballer. Born in the United States, he represented the Mexico national under-17 team.

== Career ==
After playing four seasons with the academy team of Chivas USA in his native California, Gutiérrez moved to the team's parent club Guadalajara in Mexico. He appeared for both the Chivas Guadalajara Fuerzas Básicas Sub-20 team, scoring 7 goals in 17 appearances, and Guadalajara Premier, where he scored 3 goals in 33 appearances.

On 3 June 2019, Gutiérrez joined USL Championship side LA Galaxy II.

Gutiérrez signed with Phoenix Rising FC on 7 December 2020.

Orange County SC then signed Gutiérrez to a 25-day contract on 31 May 2022. Guriérrez was sold to USL League One side Chattanooga Red Wolves on 16 September 2022.

== Honours ==
Mexico U17

- CONCACAF U-17 Championship: 2015
