= Eric Lopez (soccer) =

American soccer player (born 1999)

Personal information
- Date of birth: March 5, 1999 (age 27)
- Place of birth: Westminster, California, United States
- Height: 1.86 m (6 ft 1 in)
- Position: Goalkeeper

Youth career
- 2012–2015: LA Galaxy

Senior career*
Years	Team	Apps	(Gls)
2015–2022	LA Galaxy II	65	(0)
2020–2022	LA Galaxy	0	(0)
2023	Austin FC II	0	(0)
2023	Orange County SC	2	(0)

International career
2014–2015	United States U17	2	(0)
2015–2016	United States U18	4	(0)
- * Club domestic league appearances and goals as of October 22, 2023

Eric Lopez (born March 5, 1999) is an American professional soccer player who plays as a goalkeeper.

== Career ==
=== Youth ===
Lopez began playing with the LA Galaxy academy in 2012.

=== Professional ===
Lopez signed with LA Galaxy II ahead of their 2015 season. He was the youngest player ever to sign a United Soccer League contract.

Lopez made his professional debut for LA Galaxy II as a 20th-minute substitute against Orange County Blues on August 20, 2016. He then became the starting goalkeeper for Los Dos in the middle of the 2017 USL season.

On January 15, 2020, Lopez joined LA Galaxy's MLS roster.

Lopez was released from Galaxy's main MLS roster following the 2021 season, but signed with Galaxy II on March 3, 2022.

On January 10, 2023, Lopez was signed to a one-year contract with the newly formed Austin FC II team.

=== International ===
Born in the United States, Lopez is of Mexican descent. He has played regularly with United States youth teams. He was the youngest player to be named to the United States under-17 final squad for the 2015 FIFA U-17 World Cup.

=== Club ===
As of match played 15 October 2022

Appearances and goals by club, season and competition
Club	Season	League			National cup (Note: Includes U.S. Open Cup)		League cup (Note: Includes USL Championships Play-offs)		Continental		Total	
Club	Season	Division	Apps	Goals	Apps	Goals	Apps	Goals	Apps	Goals	Apps	Goals
LA Galaxy II	2015	United Soccer League	0	0	—		—		—		0	0
LA Galaxy II	2016	United Soccer League	1	0	—		—		—		0	0
LA Galaxy II	2017	United Soccer League	12	0	—		—		—		0	0
LA Galaxy II	2018	United Soccer League	11	0	—		—		—		0	0
LA Galaxy II	2019	USL Championship	14	0	—		—		—		0	0
LA Galaxy II	2020	USL Championship	1	0	—		—		—		0	0
LA Galaxy II	2021	USL Championship	5	0	—		—		—		0	0
LA Galaxy II	2022	USL Championship	21	0	—		—		—		0	0
LA Galaxy II	Total		67	0	—		—		—		67	0
Austin FC II	2023	MLS Next Pro	0	0	—		—		—		0	0
Austin FC II	Total		0	0	—		—		—		0	0
Career total			67	0	—		—		—		67	0

== Coaching career ==
Lopez signed with Athletes Untapped as a private soccer coach on Dec 25, 2024.
