= Daniel Aguirre =

American soccer player

Personal information
- Full name: Daniel Aguirre
- Date of birth: July 28, 1999 (age 27)
- Place of birth: Redwood City, California, United States
- Height: 1.70 m (5 ft 7 in)
- Position: Midfielder

Team information
- Current team: Guadalajara
- Number: 23

College career
Years	Team	Apps	(Gls)
2017–2020	UC Riverside Highlanders	47	(8)

Senior career*
Years	Team	Apps	(Gls)
2021–2022	LA Galaxy II	35	(3)
2021–2024	LA Galaxy	51	(2)
2023	→ Los Angeles FC 2 (loan)	1	(0)
2024–	Guadalajara	42	(4)
- * Club domestic league appearances and goals as of November 8, 2026

Daniel Aguirre (born July 28, 1999) is an American professional soccer player who plays as a midfielder for Liga MX club Guadalajara.

== Career ==
=== College and amateur ===
Aguirre played college soccer at the University of California, Riverside, where he scored 8 goals and tallied 7 assists in 47 appearances for the Highlanders. There was no play in 2020 due to the COVID-19 pandemic.

In 2019, Aguirre also appeared for USL League Two side FC Golden State Force.

=== Professional ===
On April 7, 2021, Aguirre signed with USL Championship side LA Galaxy II. Aguirre made his professional debut on April 30, 2021, starting in a 1–0 loss to Sacramento Republic.

On July 7, 2021, Aguirre signed a one-year deal to join LA Galaxy's MLS roster.

On June 10, 2024, Aguirre joined Mexican club Guadalajara. He made his Liga MX debut on July 19, 2025, in a 1–0 away loss against León.

== Personal life ==
Born in the United States, Aguirre is of Mexican descent.

== Career statistics ==
=== Club ===
As of match played on November 8, 2026

Club	Season	League			National cup		Continental		Other		Total	
Club	Season	Division	Apps	Goals	Apps	Goals	Apps	Goals	Apps	Goals	Apps	Goals
LA Galaxy II	2021	USL	28	3	—		—		—		28	3
LA Galaxy II	2022	USL	7	0	—		—		—		7	0
LA Galaxy II	Total		35	3	—		—		—		35	3
LA Galaxy	2021	MLS	5	0	—		—		—		5	0
LA Galaxy	2022	MLS	11	1	4	0	—		—		15	1
LA Galaxy	2023	MLS	25	1	3	0	—		2 (Note: Appearances in Leagues Cup)	0	30	1
LA Galaxy	2024	MLS	10	0	—		—		—		10	0
LA Galaxy	Total		51	2	7	0	—		2	0	60	2
Los Angeles FC 2 (loan)	2023	MLS Next Pro	1	0	—		—		—		1	0
Guadalajara	2025–26	Liga MX	29	4	—		—		2	0	31	4
Guadalajara	2026–27	Liga MX	13	0	—		—		1	0	14	0
Guadalajara	Total		42	4	—		—		3	0	45	4
Career total			96	5	7	0	0	0	5	0	105	5
