= 2022 LA Galaxy season =

American soccer club season

LA Galaxy
2022 season
- Owner: Philip Anschutz (AEG)
- Head coach: Greg Vanney
- Stadium: Dignity Health Sports Park
- MLS: Conference: 4th Overall: 8th
- U.S. Open Cup: Quarter-final
- MLS Cup Playoffs: Conference Semifinals
- Top goalscorer: League: Javier Hernández (17); All: Javier Hernández (18)
- Highest home attendance: League/All; 26,674 (4/23 v. NSH)
- Lowest home attendance: League: 18,337 (6/29 v. MIN); All: 9,473 (4/19 v. SD, USOC)
- Average home league attendance: 23,336
- Biggest win: LA 4–1 ATX (5/29)
- Biggest defeat: LA 0–3 HOU (5/22)
Home colors	Away colors

The 2022 LA Galaxy season was the club's 27th season of existence, and their 27th in Major League Soccer, the top-tier of the American soccer pyramid. LA Galaxy played its home matches at Dignity Health Sports Park in the LA suburb of Carson, California. The Galaxy attempted to make the playoffs after failing to qualify in 2021, also attempted to win their MLS leading 6th MLS Cup, and make their first appearance in the MLS Cup since 2014.

== Background ==
The 2021 season was the Galaxy's 26th season of existence, and their first under manager, Greg Vanney, who was appointed manager during the 2020–21 offseason following the sacking of Guillermo Barros Schelotto. Early on in the season, the Galaxy started off with an 8–4–0 record, with striker Javier Hernández leading the club in scoring with 11 goals. However, a mixture of injuries and poor form caused the club go on a skid during the summer, and ultimately, on the final day of the season, failing to qualify for the MLS Cup Playoffs for the second-consecutive season. It marked the third time in the past four seasons that the Galaxy failed to qualify for the playoffs.

Outside of MLS, the Galaxy had planned to participate in the 2021 U.S. Open Cup, which featured a modified qualification method due to COVID-19 pandemic. The method involves the eight MLS clubs with the best regular season records after three matches qualifying for the tournament. By this method, the Galaxy had the seventh best record and qualified. However, the tournament was ultimately canceled by U.S. Soccer due to logistical challenges faced by lower league clubs.

== Club ==
=== Team management ===
Position	Name
Head coach	(United States) Greg Vanney
Assistant coach	(United States) Dan Calichman
Head Athletic Trainer	(United States) Cesar Roldan
Equipment manager	(Mexico) Raul Vargas

=== Roster ===
As of August 27, 2022

No.	Pos.	Player	Nation
1	GK	ENG	Jonathan Bond
2	DF	MEX	Julián Araujo
3	DF	IRL	Derrick Williams
4	DF	FRA	Séga Coulibaly
5	MF	URU	Gastón Brugman
6	MF	ESP	Riqui Puig
7	MF	ESP	Víctor Vázquez
8	MF	USA	Mark Delgado
9	MF	FRA	Kévin Cabral (DP)
10	FW	BRA	Douglas Costa (DP)
11	MF	FRA	Samuel Grandsir
14	FW	MEX	Javier Hernández (DP)
15	DF	ESA	Eriq Zavaleta
16	MF	USA	Sacha Kljestan
18	DF	SUR	Kelvin Leerdam
19	DF	USA	Jorge Villafaña
20	DF	USA	Nick DePuy
21	GK	MEX	Richard Sánchez
22	DF	URU	Martín Cáceres
24	DF	USA	Jalen Neal (HG)
25	FW	USA	Cameron Dunbar (HG)
26	MF	MEX	Efraín Álvarez (HG)
33	GK	USA	Jonathan Klinsmann
37	MF	USA	Daniel Aguirre
43	MF	USA	Adam Saldaña (HG)
44	MF	CAN	Raheem Edwards
47	DF	USA	Owen Lambe
56	MF	MEX	Jonathan Perez (HG)
67	MF	PAN	Carlos Harvey
74	DF	USA	Marcus Ferkranus (HG)
77	DF	USA	Chase Gasper
99	FW	SRB	Dejan Joveljić

== Non-competitive ==
=== Preseason friendlies ===
Preseason friendlies announced on January 5, 2022. LA Galaxy later announced more preseason matches on January 18, 2022, in addition to announcing that the club will also host the Coachella Valley Invitational at Empire Polo Club in Indio, California from February 10 to 19, 2022.

January 29	LA Galaxy	5–4	Toronto FC	Carson, California
11:00 AM PST	Álvarez; Hernández (pen.); Cabral (pen.); Grandsir; Mutatu	Report	Nelson; Kerr, Perruzza	Stadium: Dignity Health Sports Park; Attendance: 0

February 5	LA Galaxy	4–0	New England Revolution	Carson, California
7:30 PM PST	Cabral 12' (Hernández), 47' (Araujo); Joveljić 63' (Kljestan); 70' (o.g.)	Report		Stadium: Dignity Health Sports Park

February 16	LA Galaxy	2–4	Vancouver Whitecaps FC	Carson, California
1:30 PM PST	Grandsir 54' (Araujo); Mutatu 74'	LAG Tweet; VAN Report	White 9' (Gauld), 41' (Brown), 88'; Aguilar 85' (White)	Stadium: Dignity Health Sports Park; Attendance: 0

February 19	LA Galaxy	2–2	D.C. United	Carson, California
3:00 PM PST	Hernández 26', 74'; Cabral (yellow card) 42'	Report	Birnbaum 14'; Estrada 58'; Liadi (yellow card) 77'	Stadium: Dignity Health Sports Park; Attendance: 9,534; Referee: Alex Chilowicz

==== Coachella Valley Invitational ====
February 10	LA Galaxy	1–1	Seattle Sounders FC	Indio, California
11:00 PST	Joveljić 48'	Report	Ruidíaz 41'	Stadium: Empire Polo Club; Attendance: 0

February 13	LA Galaxy	2–1	New York Red Bulls	Indio, California
12:00 PST	Vázquez 4'; Hernández 54'	Report	Mullings 68'	Stadium: Empire Polo Club; Attendance: 0

=== Midseason friendlies ===
August 3 Leagues Cup Showcase	LA Galaxy	2–0	Guadalajara	Inglewood, California
5:30 p.m.	Joveljić 28'; Coulibaly (yellow card) 38'; Kljestan (yellow card) 57'; Perez 62'	Report	Briseño (yellow card) 56'	Stadium: SoFi Stadium; Attendance: 71,189; Referee: Luis Enrique Santander (Mexico)

== Competitive ==
=== Major League Soccer ===
==== Standings ====
===== Overall =====
Pos	Team	Pld	W	L	T	GF	GA	GD	Pts
6	New York Red Bulls	34	15	11	8	50	41	+9	53
7	FC Dallas	34	14	9	11	48	37	+11	53
8	LA Galaxy	34	14	12	8	58	51	+7	50
9	Nashville SC	34	13	10	11	52	41	+11	50
10	FC Cincinnati	34	12	9	13	64	56	+8	49

Source: MLS
Rules for classification: 1) points; 2) total wins; 3) total goal differential; 4) total goals scored; 5) fewer disciplinary points; 6) away goal differential; 7) away goals scored; 8) home goals differential; 9) home goals scored; 10) coin toss (2 clubs tied) or drawing of lots (≥3 clubs tied)

===== Western Conference =====
Pos	Team	Pld	W	L	T	GF	GA	GD	Pts	Qualification
2	Austin FC	34	16	10	8	65	49	+16	56	Qualification for the first round & CONCACAF Champions League
3	FC Dallas	34	14	9	11	48	37	+11	53	Qualification for the first round
4	LA Galaxy	34	14	12	8	58	51	+7	50	Qualification for the first round
5	Nashville SC	34	13	10	11	52	41	+11	50	Qualification for the first round
6	Minnesota United FC	34	14	14	6	48	51	−3	48	Qualification for the first round

Source: MLS
Rules for classification: 1) points; 2) total wins; 3) total goal differential; 4) total goals scored; 5) fewer disciplinary points; 6) away goal differential; 7) away goals scored; 8) home goals differential; 9) home goals scored; 10) coin toss (2 clubs tied) or drawing of lots (≥3 clubs tied)

==== Regular season ====
Overall								Home						Away					
Pld	Pts	W	L	T	GF	GA	GD	W	L	T	GF	GA	GD	W	L	T	GF	GA	GD
34	50	14	12	8	58	51	+7	8	5	4	35	25	+10	6	7	4	23	26	−3

Last updated: September 4th, 2022
Source: MLS Results
Pld = Matches played; Pts = Points; W = Matches won; T = Matches tied; L = Matches lost; GF = Goals for; GA = Goals against; GD = Goal difference

=== February ===
February 27 1	LA Galaxy	1–0	New York City FC	Carson, California
14:00 PST	Douglas Costa (yellow card) 41'; Hernández 90'	Report	Acevedo (yellow card) 15'; Amundsen (yellow card) 54'; Callens (yellow card) 90+5'	Stadium: Dignity Health Sports Park; Attendance: 25,174; Referee: Joe Dickerson

=== March ===
March 5 2	Charlotte FC	0–1	LA Galaxy	Charlotte, North Carolina
17:30 PST	Fuchs (yellow card) 37'	Report	Coulibaly (yellow card) 45+1'; Álvarez 77'	Stadium: Bank of America Stadium; Attendance: 74,479; Referee: Jair Marrufo

March 12 3	Seattle Sounders FC	3–2	LA Galaxy	Seattle, Washington
12:30 p.m. PST, FOX	Morris 17'; Vargas (yellow card) 29'; João Paulo (yellow card) 38'; Montero 45+2' (pen.); Nouhou (yellow card) 46'; Arreaga 72'; Bruin (yellow card) 90'; Roldan (yellow card) 90+1'	Report	Hernández 6'; DePuy (yellow card) 44'; Cabral (yellow card) 45+4'; Douglas Costa 48'	Stadium: Lumen Field; Attendance: 33,200; Referee: Allen Chapman

March 19 4	LA Galaxy	0–1	Orlando City SC	Carson, California
12:30 p.m. PST		Report	Torres 9'; Ruan (yellow card) 44'; João Moutinho (yellow card) 70'; Araújo (yellow card) 90+3'	Stadium: Dignity Health Sports Park; Attendance: 25,174; Referee: Alex Chilowicz

=== April ===
April 3 5	Portland Timbers	1–3	LA Galaxy	Portland, Oregon
1:30 p.m. PST, FS1	Bonilla (red card) 45+3'; Blanco (yellow card) 48'; Tuiloma 51'; D. Chará (yellow card) 90+2'	Report	Hernández 9', 59', (yellow card) 57'; Tuiloma 16' (o.g.); Raveloson (yellow card) 45+4'; DePuy (yellow card) 48'; Delgado (yellow card) 50' (yellow-red card) 61'	Stadium: Providence Park; Attendance: 24,534; Referee: Nima Saghafi

April 9 6	LA Galaxy	2–1	Los Angeles FC	Carson, California
4:30 p.m. PST, FOX	Hernández 13', (yellow card) 90+3'; Coulibaly 31', (yellow card) 63'; Araujo (yellow card) 37'; Williams (yellow card) 70'; Douglas Costa (yellow card) 85'; Leerdam (yellow card) 85'; Álvarez (yellow card) 89'	Report	Hollingshead (yellow card) 49'; Arango 79', (yellow card) 90+10'; Murillo (yellow card) 90+4'	Stadium: Dignity Health Sports Park; Attendance: 25,174; Referee: Chris Penso

April 16 7	Chicago Fire FC	0–0	LA Galaxy	Chicago, Illinois
5:00 p.m. PST	Czichos (yellow card) 24'; Pineda (yellow card) 44'; Giménez (yellow card) 49'; Navarro (yellow card) 69'	Report	Williams (yellow card) 38'; Coulibaly (yellow card) 76'	Stadium: Soldier Field; Attendance: 30,282; Referee: Ted Unkel

April 23 8	LA Galaxy	1–0	Nashville SC	Carson, California
7:30 p.m. PST	Joveljić 86', (yellow card) 87'; Hernández (yellow card) 89'	Report		Stadium: Dignity Health Sports Park; Attendance: 26,674; Referee: Allen Chapman

April 30 9	Real Salt Lake	1–0	LA Galaxy	Sandy, Utah
12:30 p.m. PST	Córdova (yellow card) 42'; Silva 49', (yellow card) 50'	Report		Stadium: Rio Tinto Stadium; Attendance: 20,775; Referee: Drew Fischer

=== May ===
May 8 10	Austin FC	0–1	LA Galaxy	Austin, Texas
4:00 p.m. PST, FS1	Ring (yellow card) 21'	Report	Delgado 6', (yellow card) 14'; Coulibaly (yellow card) 28'; Bond (yellow card) 53'; Williams (yellow card) 67'; Gasper (yellow card) 88'	Stadium: Q2 Stadium; Attendance: 20,738; Referee: Ismail Elfath

May 14 11	LA Galaxy	1–3	FC Dallas	Carson, California
7:30 p.m. PST	Douglas Costa 67', (yellow card) 77'; Coulibaly (yellow card) 90+5'	Report	Ferreira 11', 23'; Arriola 20', (yellow card) 75'; Ntsabeleng (yellow card) 26'; Farfan (yellow card) 64'	Stadium: Dignity Health Sports Park; Attendance: 25,174; Referee: Chris Penso

May 18 12	Minnesota United FC	1–1	LA Galaxy	St. Paul, Minnesota
5:00 p.m. PST	Boxall (yellow card) 35'; Arriaga (yellow card) 41'; Lod 87'	Report	Raveloson (yellow card) 2'; Kljestan 83' (pen.)	Stadium: Allianz Field; Attendance: 19,645; Referee: Jair Marrufo

May 22 13	LA Galaxy	0–3	Houston Dynamo FC	Carson, California
5:00 p.m. PST	DePuy (yellow card) 65'	Report	Ferreira 11'; Rodríguez (yellow card) 16'; Pasher 58'; Úlfarsson 62', (yellow card) 62'; Avila (yellow card) 80'; Hadebe (yellow card) 86'	Stadium: Dignity Health Sports Park; Attendance: 22,471; Referee: Marcos de Oliveira

May 29 14	LA Galaxy	4–1	Austin FC	Carson, California
3:00 p.m. PST	Hernández 61'; Joveljić 64', 88', (yellow card) 79'; Raveloson (yellow card) 77'; Álvarez 90'	Report	Fagúndez 53'	Stadium: Dignity Health Sports Park; Attendance: 20,433; Referee: Rubiel Vazquez

=== June ===
June 18 15	LA Galaxy	1–1	Portland Timbers	Carson, California
2:00 p.m. PST, ESPN	DePuy (yellow card) 37'; Grandsir (yellow card) 58'; Joveljić 88', (yellow card) 89'	Report	Mabiala (yellow card) 10'; Chará 38'; Fogaça (yellow card) 76'	Stadium: Dignity Health Sports Park; Attendance: 21,414; Referee: Joe Dickerson

June 29 17	LA Galaxy	2–3	Minnesota United FC	Carson, California
7:30 p.m. PST	Cabral (red card) 25'; Delgado 60' (pen.); Williams (yellow card) 70'; Joveljić 90+3'; Costa (red card) 90+5'	Report	Reynoso 9', 43'; Boxall (yellow card) 20'; Fragapane 36', (yellow card) 41'; Trapp (yellow card) 85'; Rosales (yellow card) 90+4' (yellow-red card) 90+5'	Stadium: Dignity Health Sports Park; Attendance: 18,337; Referee: Ted Unkel

=== July ===
July 4 18	LA Galaxy	4–0	CF Montreal	Carson, California
7:30 p.m. PST	Hernández 8'; Delgado (yellow card) 27'; Joveljić 45+4' (pen.); Raveloson 60', 79'	Report	Piette (yellow card) 38'; Miljevic (yellow card) 90'	Stadium: Dignity Health Sports Park; Attendance: 23,855; Referee: Timothy Ford

July 8 19	Los Angeles FC	3–2	LA Galaxy	Los Angeles, California
7:00 p.m. PST, ESPN	Cifuentes 17', 70'; Palacios (yellow card) 50'; Arango 72'	Report	Álvarez (yellow card) 8'; Coulibaly (yellow card) 45+3'; Grandsir 55'; Edwards (yellow card) 59'; Raveloson 81'; Williams (yellow card) 90+1'	Stadium: Banc of California Stadium; Attendance: 22,231; Referee: Armando Villarreal

July 13 20	LA Galaxy	2–3	San Jose Earthquakes	Carson, California
7:00 p.m. PST, FS1	Grandsir (yellow card) 33'; Joveljić 48', 88'	Report	Espinoza 13' (pen.); Ebobisse 14'; López 40', (yellow card) 41'	Stadium: Dignity Health Sports Park; Attendance: 18,453; Referee: Allen Chapman

July 16 21	Colorado Rapids	2–0	LA Galaxy	Commerce City, Colorado
6:00 p.m. PST	Rubio 20'; Wilson (yellow card) 68'; Zardes 75'; Warner (yellow card) 90+2'	Report	Raveloson (yellow card) 39'; Araujo (yellow card) 62'; DePuy (yellow card) 68'; Gasper (yellow card) 78'	Stadium: Dick's Sporting Goods Park; Attendance: 17,975; Referee: Guido Gonzales Jr.

July 24 22	LA Galaxy	2–0	Atlanta United FC	Carson, California
6:30 p.m. PST, FS1	Cabral 7'; Brugman (yellow card) 52'; Delgado (yellow card) 90+3'; Joveljic 90+6'	Report	Sejdić (yellow card) 43'; Franco (yellow card) 67'; Dwyer (yellow card) 77'; Sosa (yellow card) 79'	Stadium: Dignity Health Sports Park; Attendance: 24,122; Referee: Marcos de Oliveira

July 30 23	FC Dallas	1–0	LA Galaxy	Frisco, Texas
6:00 p.m. PST	Jara 9', (yellow card) 35'; Cerrillo (yellow card) 82'; Arriola (yellow card) 86'	Report	Gasper (yellow card) 22'; Zavaleta (yellow card) 38'; Edwards (yellow card) 53'; Araujo (yellow card) 62'	Stadium: Toyota Stadium; Attendance: 19,096; Referee: Pierre-Luc Lauziere

=== August ===
August 6 24	Sporting Kansas City	4–2	LA Galaxy	Kansas City, Kansas
5:30 p.m. PST	Thommy 10'; Agada 40', 45+5'; Espinoza (yellow card) 56'; Sallói 90+5'	Report	Williams (yellow card) 24'; Gasper (yellow card) 26'; Hernández (yellow card) 63', (goal) 83', 90+2' (pen.)	Stadium: Children's Mercy Park; Attendance: 18,101; Referee: Michael Radchuk

August 13 25	LA Galaxy	5–2	Vancouver Whitecaps FC	Carson, California
7:00 p.m. PST	Grandsir 12', 40'; Hernández 20' (pen.); Vázquez 30'; Coulibaly (yellow card) 59'; Araujo (yellow card) 63'; Edwards (yellow card) 71'; Álvarez 89'; DePuy (yellow card) 90+4'	Report	Gauld 38'; Veselinović (yellow card) 68'; Ricketts 70'; Dájome (yellow card) 72' (yellow-red card) 79'	Stadium: Dignity Health Sports Park; Attendance: 21,465; Referee: Silviu Petrescu

August 19 26	LA Galaxy	3–3	Seattle Sounders FC	Carson, California
7:00 p.m. PST, ESPN	Hernández 10'; Vázquez 42', (yellow card) 58'; Grandsir (yellow card) 49'; Joveljić 90+2' (pen.)	Report	Rowe 53'; Ruidíaz 61'; Morris 73'; Lodeiro (yellow card) 75'; Leyna (yellow card) 90+1'; Medranda (yellow card) 90+6'	Stadium: Dignity Health Sports Park; Attendance: 23,278; Referee: Víctor Rivas

August 28 27	New England Revolution	1–2	LA Galaxy	Foxborough, Massachusetts
5:00 p.m. PST	Kessler (yellow card) 38'; Gil 82'	Report	Aguirre 4'; Hernández 15', (yellow card) 70'; Brugman (yellow card) 52'; Gasper (yellow card) 57'	Stadium: Gillette Stadium; Attendance: 21,517; Referee: Lukasz Szpala

August 31 28	Toronto FC	2–2	LA Galaxy	Toronto, Canada
4:30 p.m. PST	MacNaughton (yellow card) 51'; Jiménez 62'; Bernardeschi 81' (pen.)	Report	Brugman (yellow card) 15'; Douglas Costa 24'; Araujo (yellow card) 84'; Puig 89'	Stadium: BMO Field; Attendance: 29,130; Referee: Ted Unkel

=== September ===
September 4 29	LA Galaxy	2–2	Sporting Kansas City	Carson, California
5:00 p.m. PST	Hernández 4', 88' (pen.); Edwards (yellow card) 47'	Report	Russell 67' (pen.); Hernández 76'; Walter (yellow card) 84'	Stadium: Dignity Health Sports Park; Attendance: 20,104; Referee: Ramy Touchan

September 10 30	Nashville SC	1–1	LA Galaxy	Nashville, Tennessee
12:30 p.m. PST	Mukhtar 29' (pen.); Zimmerman (yellow card) 31' (yellow-red card) 90+7'; Romney (yellow card) 42'; Leal (yellow card) 45+2'; Moore (yellow card) 84'	Report	Coulibaly (yellow card) 22'; Williams (yellow card) 27'; Puig (yellow card) 27', (goal) 90+9' (pen.); Edwards (yellow card) 43'; Vázquez (yellow card) 61'	Stadium: Geodis Park; Attendance: 28,753; Referee: Chris Penso

September 14 31	Vancouver Whitecaps FC	3–0	LA Galaxy	Vancouver, Canada
7:00 p.m. PST	Owusu (yellow card) 7'; Martins (yellow card) 38'; Gauld 57'; Vite (yellow card) 62', (goal) 68'; Berhalter (yellow card) 81'; Ricketts 86'	Report	Vázquez (yellow card) 63'	Stadium: BC Place; Attendance: 16,681; Referee: Fotis Bazakos

September 17 32	LA Galaxy	4–1	Colorado Rapids	Carson, California
7:30 p.m. PST	Brugman 22', 52'; Edwards 28'; Hernández 31'; Costa (red card) 62'	Report	Gutiérrez (yellow card) 26'; Abubakar (yellow card) 34'; Beitashour (yellow card) 60'; Barrios (yellow card) 63'; Max (yellow card) 65'; Nicholson 90+1'	Stadium: Dignity Health Sports Park; Attendance: 20,325; Referee: Joseph Dickerson

September 24 16	San Jose Earthquakes	2–3	LA Galaxy	Stanford, California
7:00 p.m. PST	Judson (yellow card) 29'; Tsakiris (yellow card) 47'; Espinoza 74' (pen.); Remedi (yellow card) 83'; Nathan 90+5'	Report	Hernández 12', 69', (yellow card) 31'; Brugman 42'; Grandsir (yellow card) 56'; Bond (yellow card) 73'	Stadium: Stanford Stadium; Attendance: 44,200; Referee: Alex Chilowicz
Note: This match originally scheduled for June 25, was postponed to September 24, due to issues involving a power outage in the area.

=== October ===
October 1 33	LA Galaxy	1–1	Real Salt Lake	Carson, California
7:30 p.m. PST	Hernández (yellow card) 45+1'; Douglas Costa 68' (pen.); Cáceres (yellow card) 90+4'	Report	Córdova 25'; Luna (yellow card) 90'	Stadium: Dignity Health Sports Park; Attendance: 26,674; Referee: Kevin Stott

October 9 34	Houston Dynamo FC	1–3	LA Galaxy	Houston, Texas
2:00 p.m. PST	Ferreira 8'; Parker (yellow card) 78'; Rodríguez (yellow card) 90+3'	Report	Hernández (yellow card) 17', (goal) 32'; Puig 31'; Araujo (yellow card) 61'; Joveljić 69'	Stadium: PNC Stadium; Attendance: 21,284; Referee: Drew Fischer

=== Playoffs ===
All times are in Pacific Time Zone.

==== First round ====
October 15 First round	LA Galaxy	1–0	Nashville SC	Carson, California
12:00 p.m. PST	Araujo 60', (yellow card) 64'; Brugman (yellow card) 79'	Report	Zimmerman (yellow card) 20'; Anunga (yellow card) 58'	Stadium: Dignity Health Sports Park; Attendance: 22,280; Referee: Armando Villarreal

==== Conference Semifinals ====
October 20 Conference Semifinals	Los Angeles FC	3–2	LA Galaxy	Los Angeles, California
19:00 PST	Bouanga 23', 80'; Palacios (yellow card) 56'; Murillo (yellow card) 58'; Vela (yellow card) 63'; Arango 90+3'	Report	Puig (yellow card) 12'; Grandsir 44'; Edwards (yellow card) 45+3'; Joveljić 85'	Stadium: Banc of California Stadium; Attendance: 22,305; Referee: Allen Chapman

=== U.S. Open Cup ===
==== Third round ====
The draw for the third round was held on April 8, 2022.

April 19	LA Galaxy (California)	1–0	(California) San Diego Loyal SC	Carson, California
7:30 pm PDT	Cabral 28'	Report	Guido (yellow card) 30'; Stoneman (yellow card) 68'	Stadium: Dignity Health Sports Park; Attendance: 9,473; Referee: Brandon Stevis

==== Round of 32 ====
The draw for the round of 32 was held on April 21, 2022.

May 11	California United Strikers FC	2–3	(California) LA Galaxy	Irvine, California
7:30 pm PDT	Kadono 19'; Garcia-Lopez 88'	Report	Joveljić 45' (pen.), 83' (pen.); Álvarez (yellow card) 72'; Lambe 80'	Stadium: Championship Soccer Stadium; Attendance: 3,749; Referee: Samantha Martinez

==== Round of 16 ====
The draw for the Round of 16 and the Quarter-final was held on May 12, 2022.

May 25	LA Galaxy (California)	3–1	(California) Los Angeles FC	Carson, California
7:30 pm PDT	Delgado (yellow card) 10'; Hernández (yellow card) 39', (goal) 57'; Cabral 51', (yellow card) 55'; Joveljić 81'	Report	Acosta (yellow card) 39'; Hollingshead (yellow card) 64', (goal) 85'	Stadium: Dignity Health Sports Park; Attendance: 24,174; Referee: Brandon Stevis

==== Quarter-final ====
June 21	LA Galaxy (California)	1–2	(California) Sacramento Republic FC	Carson, California
7:30 pm PDT	Donovan 18' (o.g.); Cabral (yellow card) 25'; Williams (yellow card) 42'; Aguirre (yellow card) 52'; Araujo (yellow card) 90+1'; Grandsir (yellow card) 90+2'	Report	López 4'; Luis Felipe 70'	Stadium: Dignity Health Sports Park; Attendance: 12,315; Referee: Malik Badawi

== Statistics ==
=== Appearances and goals ===
Numbers after plus-sign(+) denote appearances as a substitute.

No.	Pos	Nat	Player	Total		MLS		U.S. Open Cup	
No.	Pos	Nat	Player	Apps	Goals	Apps	Goals	Apps	Goals
Goalkeepers
1	GK	(England) ENG	Jonathan Bond	19	0	19	0	0	0
Defenders
2	DF	(Mexico) MEX	Julián Araujo	18	0	17+1	0	0	0
3	DF	(Republic of Ireland) IRL	Derrick Williams	16	0	14+2	0	0	0
4	DF	(France) FRA	Séga Coulibaly	14	1	13+1	1	0	0
20	DF	(United States) USA	Nick DePuy	13	0	10+3	0	0	0
18	DF	(Suriname) SUR	Kelvin Leerdam	7	0	4+3	0	0	0
77	DF	(United States) USA	Chase Gasper	6	0	1+5	0	0	0
15	DF	(El Salvador) ESA	Eriq Zavaleta	1	0	1+0	0	0	0
Midfielders
8	MF	(United States) USA	Mark Delgado	17	2	17	2	0	0
6	MF	(Madagascar) MAD	Rayan Raveloson	19	0	18+1	0	0	0
7	MF	(Spain) ESP	Víctor Vázquez	14	0	9+5	0	0	0
26	MF	(Mexico) MEX	Efraín Álvarez	18	2	11+7	2	0	0
16	MF	(United States) USA	Sacha Kljestan	13	1	0+13	1	0	0
37	MF	(United States) USA	Daniel Aguirre	7	0	2+5	0	0	0
56	MF	(Mexico) MEX	Jonathan Perez	1	0	0+1	0	0	0
Forwards
99	FW	(Serbia) SRB	Dejan Joveljić	17	8	4+13	8	0	0
14	FW	(Mexico) MEX	Javier Hernández	18	7	17+1	7	0	0
10	FW	(Brazil) BRA	Douglas Costa	14	2	9+5	2	0	0
11	MF	(France) FRA	Samuel Grandsir	19	1	12+7	1	0	0
9	MF	(France) FRA	Kévin Cabral	18	0	13+5	0	0	0
44	MF	(Canada) CAN	Raheem Edwards	18	0	18	0	0	0

- Last updated: June 11
- Source: Team Stats

=== Top scorers ===
Rank	Position	Number	Name	MLS	Playoffs	U.S. Open Cup	Total
1	FW	14	(Mexico) Javier Hernández	18	0	1	19
2	FW	99	(Serbia) Dejan Joveljić	11	1	3	15
3	FW	10	(Brazil) Douglas Costa	4	0	0	4
3	MF	11	(France) Samuel Grandsir	3	1	0	4
4	FW	26	(Mexico) Efraín Álvarez	3	0	0	3
4	MF	5	(Uruguay) Gastón Brugman	3	0	0	3
4	FW	9	(France) Kévin Cabral	1	0	2	3
4	MF	6	(Spain) Riqui Puig	3	0	0	3
4	MF	6	(Madagascar) Rayan Raveloson	3	0	0	3
5	MF	8	(United States) Mark Delgado	2	0	0	2
5	MF	7	(Spain) Víctor Vázquez	2	0	0	2
6	MF	37	(United States) Daniel Aguirre	1	0	0	1
6	DF	2	(Mexico) Julián Araujo	0	1	0	1
6	DF	4	(France) Séga Coulibaly	1	0	0	1
6	MF	44	(Canada) Raheem Edwards	1	0	0	1
6	MF	16	(United States) Sacha Kljestan	1	0	0	1
6	DF	47	(United States) Owen Lambe	0	0	1	1

|}

- Last updated: September 24
- Source: Team Stats

=== Top assists ===
Rank	Position	Number	Name	MLS	U.S. Open Cup	Total
1	MF	44	(Canada) Raheem Edwards	5	1	6
2	MF	11	(France) Samuel Grandsir	3	2	5
3	MF	6	(Madagascar) Rayan Raveloson	3	0	3
4	FW	99	(Serbia) Dejan Joveljić	2	0	2
4	FW	26	(Mexico) Efraín Álvarez	1	1	2
5	DF	2	(Mexico) Julián Araujo	1	0	1
5	DF	3	(Republic of Ireland) Derrick Williams	1	0	1
5	MF	7	(Spain) Víctor Vázquez	1	0	1
5	MF	16	(United States) Sacha Kljestan	1	0	1
5	MF	9	(France) Kévin Cabral	0	1	1

- Last updated: June 4
- Source: Team Stats

=== Clean sheets ===
Rank	Number	Name	MLS	Playoffs	U.S. Open Cup	Total
1	1	(England) Jonathan Bond	7	1	0	8
2	33	(United States) Jonathan Klinsmann	0	0	1	1

- Last updated: June 4
- Source: Team Stats

=== Disciplinary record ===
No.	Pos.	Player	MLS			U.S. Open Cup			Total		
No.	Pos.	Player	Booked	(yellow card) (yellow-red card)	Sent off (straight red)	Booked	(yellow card) (yellow-red card)	Sent off (straight red)	Booked	(yellow card) (yellow-red card)	Sent off (straight red)
10	FW	(Brazil) Douglas Costa	1	0	0	0	0	0	1	0	0

- Last updated: February 27
- Source: Team Stats

== Transfers ==
=== Transfers in ===
Pos.	Player	Transferred from	Fee/notes	Date	Source
DF	(Suriname) Kelvin Leerdam	(United States) Inter Miami CF	Sign.	January 6, 2022	
MF	(Canada) Raheem Edwards	(United States) Los Angeles FC	Sign.	January 7, 2022	
GK	(Mexico) Richard Sánchez	(United States) North Texas SC	Sign.	January 18, 2022	
MF	(United States) Mark Delgado	(Canada) Toronto FC	Traded for $400,000 GAM and $100,000 conditional GAM	January 21, 2022	
FW	(Brazil) Douglas Costa	(Brazil) Grêmio	Loan	February 10, 2022	
DF	(El Salvador) Eriq Zavaleta	(Canada) Toronto FC	Sign.	March 10, 2022	
FW	(United States) Preston Judd	(United States) LA Galaxy II	Sign.	April 4, 2022	
DF	(United States) Chase Gasper	(United States) Minnesota United FC	Traded for $450,000 GAM and $300,000 conditional GAM	May 4, 2022	
DF	(United States) Owen Lambe	(United States) LA Galaxy II	Loan	May 11, 2022	
MF	(Uruguay) Gastón Brugman	(Italy) Parma	Transfer	July 6, 2022	
MF	(Spain) Riqui Puig	(Spain) Barcelona	Transfer	August 4, 2022	
DF	(Uruguay) Martín Cáceres	(Spain) Levante	Sign.	August 24, 2022	

=== Transfers out ===
Pos.	Player	Transferred to	Fee/notes	Date	Source
DF	(Finland) Niko Hämäläinen	(England) Queens Park Rangers F.C.	Loan expired	November 8, 2021	
DF	(United States) Daniel Steres	(United States) Houston Dynamo FC	Trade for the 2022 MLS SuperDraft third round pick.	December 12, 2021	
FW	(United States) Ethan Zubak	(United States) Nashville SC	Trade for the 2022 MLS SuperDraft first round pick.	December 12, 2021	
MF	(United States) Sebastian Lletget	(United States) New England Revolution	$300,000 in General Allocation Money.	December 15, 2021	
DF	(Honduras) Danilo Acosta	(United States) Orange County SC	Option declined	January 7, 2022	
DF	(Jamaica) Oniel Fisher	(United States) Minnesota United FC	Option declined	February 2, 2022	
FW	(Sierra Leone) Augustine Williams	(United States) Charleston Battery	Option declined	February 9, 2022	
MF	(Madagascar) Rayan Raveloson	(France) Auxerre	Transfer	August 4, 2022	

=== Draft picks ===
Draft picks are not automatically signed to the team roster. Only those who are signed to a contract will be listed as transfers in.

Date	Player	Position	College	Pick	Source
January 11, 2022	(Zimbabwe) Farai Mutatu	FW	Michigan State	21	
January 11, 2022	(United States) Callum Johnson	MF	Clemson	42	
January 11, 2022	(United States) Chandler Vaughn	DF	Saint Louis University	60	
