= Séga Coulibaly =

Malian-French footballer (born 1996)

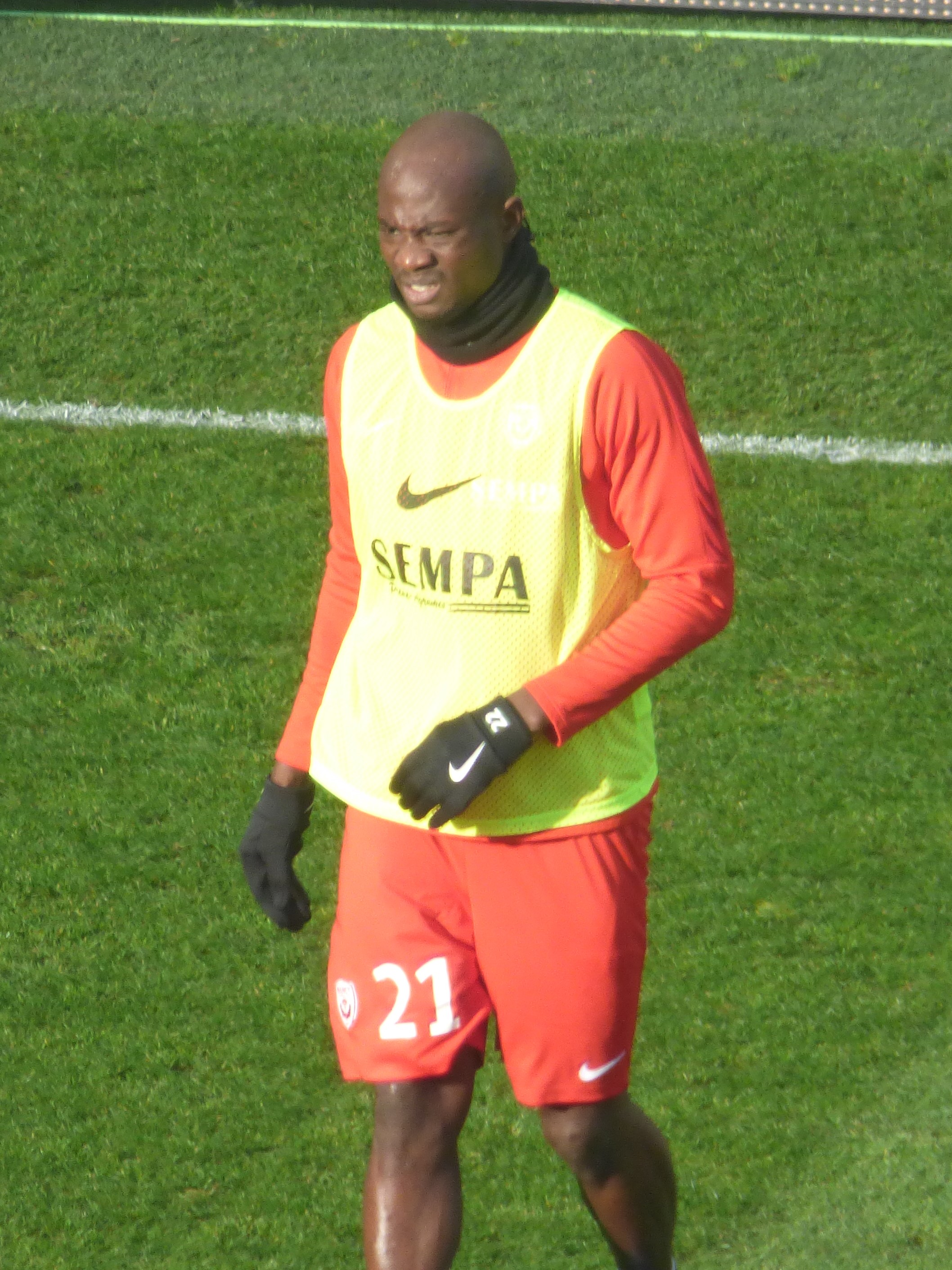
- Coulibaly with Nancy in 2019

Personal information
- Date of birth: 9 June 1996 (age 30)
- Place of birth: Bamako, Mali
- Height: 1.82 m (6 ft 0 in)
- Position: Defender

Team information
- Current team: Charlotte Independence
- Number: 4

Youth career
- 2003–2005: Blosne Cercle Paul Bert Rennes
- 2005–2016: Rennes

Senior career*
Years	Team	Apps	(Gls)
2013–2017	Rennes II	46	(1)
2016–2018	Rennes	0	(0)
2016–2017	→ Sedan (loan)	18	(0)
2018	→ Avranches (loan)	13	(0)
2018–2020	Nancy II	13	(1)
2018–2021	Nancy	37	(2)
2019–2020	→ Avranches (loan)	16	(1)
2021–2023	LA Galaxy	49	(1)
2025	Châteauroux	1	(0)
2025	Portland Hearts of Pine	8	(0)
2026–	Charlotte Independence	14	(0)

International career^{‡}
2011–2012	France U16	5	(1)
2012–2013	France U17	9	(2)
2013–2014	France U18	4	(0)
2016	France U20	2	(0)
- * Club domestic league appearances and goals as of 31 October 2026 ‡ National team caps and goals as of 26 May 2016

Séga Coulibaly (born 9 June 1996) is a professional footballer who played as a defender for USL League One side Charlotte Independence. Born in Mali, he has represented France at youth level.

== Club career ==
=== Rennes ===
Coulibaly is a youth product of Stade Rennais F.C. He signed his first professional contract with Rennes on 13 July 2016.

On 2 August 2016, Coulibaly signed a one-year loan deal with CS Sedan Ardennes. He made his professional debut with Sedan on 5 August 2016 at US Avranches in the Championnat National. He played the whole match in a 1–1 draw.

In January 2018, Coulibaly joined US Avranches on loan for the remainder of the 2018–19 season, becoming an "essential" element of the team's survival in the 2018–19 Championnat National, according to coach Damien Ott.

=== Nancy ===
On 13 June 2018, Coulibaly signed a three-year contract with Ligue 2 side Nancy.

In September 2019, Coulibaly again joined US Avranches on loan.

=== LA Galaxy ===
On 28 April 2021, Coulibaly moved to the United States and signed a two-year deal with Major League Soccer side LA Galaxy. With his contract expiring that summer, LA Galaxy paid a nominal transfer fee to secure his arrival before the summer transfer window. He departed the Galaxy after the 2023 season, having made 53 appearances for the club.

=== LB Châteauroux ===
Coulibaly joined LB Châteauroux in the Championnat National 2 in February 2025. He made one league appearance for La Berri before departing at the conclusion of the European season.

=== Portland Hearts of Pine ===
After his brief stint with Châteauroux, Coulibaly joined returned to the United States to join USL League One side Portland Hearts of Pine on 1 July 2025. He made his debut on 6 July, coming on as a substitute in a 1–1 draw with Tormenta FC. He was subbed off after 17 minutes following an injury. After spending the rest of July recovering, Coulibaly started and captained the Hearts of Pine in a friendly against HFX Wanderers FC on 6 August, and also started that weekend's League One match against Richmond Kickers. He played the full 90 minutes for the club's playoff match against Chattanooga Red Wolves SC, and the full 120 minutes for the next playoff match against Spokane Velocity, scoring a penalty in the penalty shootout in the latter match.

=== First retirement and Charlotte Independence ===
Following the conclusion of the season, Coulibaly announced his retirement via Instagram. However, on 6 February 2026, Coulibaly was announced as the newest player for USL League One side Charlotte Independence.

== Personal life ==
Born in Bamako, Coulibaly holds both Malian and French nationalities.

== Career statistics ==
=== Club ===
As of 18 September 2022

Appearances and goals by club, season and competition
Club	Season	League			National Cup		League Cup		Continental		Other (Note: Includes Trophée des champions)		Total	
Club	Season	Division	Apps	Goals	Apps	Goals	Apps	Goals	Apps	Goals	Apps	Goals	Apps	Goals
Rennes	2015–16	Ligue 1	0	0	0	0	0	0	—		—		0	0
Rennes	2017–18	Ligue 1	0	0	0	0	0	0	—		—		0	0
Rennes	Total		0	0	0	0	0	0	0	0	0	0	0	0
Sedan (loan)	2016–17	National	18	0	1	0	—		—		—		19	0
Avranches (loan)	2017–18	National	13	0	0	0	—		—		—		13	0
Nancy	2018–19	Ligue 2	14	0	3	0	2	0	—		—		19	0
Nancy	2019–20	Ligue 2	1	0	—		2	0	—		—		3	0
Nancy	2020–21	Ligue 2	22	2	1	0	0	0	—		—		23	2
Nancy	Total		37	2	4	0	4	0	0	0	0	0	45	2
Avranches (loan)	2019–20	National	16	1	0	0	—		—		—		16	1
LA Galaxy	2021	Major League Soccer	19	0	—		0	0	—		—		19	0
LA Galaxy	2022	Major League Soccer	27	1	1	0	0	0	—		—		28	1
LA Galaxy	Total		46	1	1	0	0	0	0	0	0	0	47	1
Career total			130	4	6	0	4	0	0	0	0	0	140	4
