= Efraín Álvarez =

Mexican footballer (born 2002)

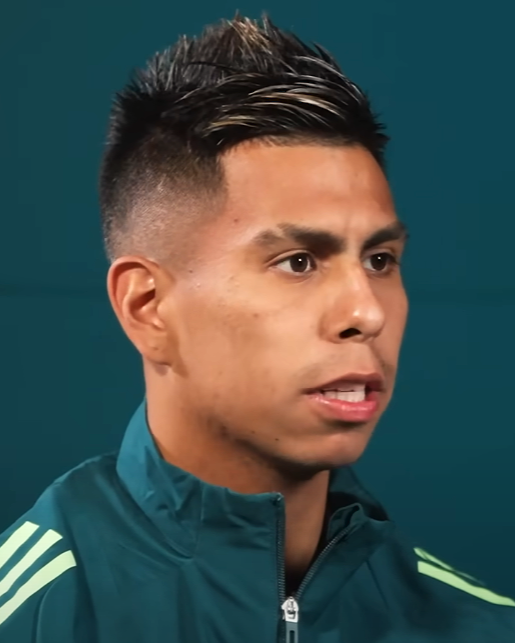
- Álvarez in 2025

Personal information
- Full name: Efraín Álvarez
- Date of birth: 19 June 2002 (age 24)
- Place of birth: East Los Angeles, California, United States
- Height: 1.75 m (5 ft 9 in)
- Position: Attacking midfielder

Team information
- Current team: Guadalajara
- Number: 10

Youth career
- 2016–2017: LA Galaxy

Senior career*
Years	Team	Apps	(Gls)
2017–2019	LA Galaxy II	20	(13)
2019–2023	LA Galaxy	94	(6)
2023–2025	Tijuana	52	(8)
2025–	Guadalajara	55	(4)

International career^{‡}
2016	United States U15	4	(4)
2017	Mexico U15	9	(1)
2018–2019	Mexico U17	25	(13)
2022	Mexico U21	4	(2)
2021–	Mexico	7	(1)
Medal record
Men's football
Representing Mexico
CONCACAF Nations League
Winner	2025 United States
CONCACAF Gold Cup
Winner	2025 United States–Canada	Team
Runner-up	2021 United States	Team
Toulon Tournament
Third place	2022 France	Team
FIFA U-17 World Cup
Runner-up	2019 Brazil	Team
CONCACAF U-17 Championship
Winner	2019 United States
- * Club domestic league appearances and goals as of 8 November 2026 ‡ National team caps and goals as of 25 February 2026

Efraín Álvarez (born 19 June 2002) is a professional footballer who plays as an attacking midfielder for Liga MX club Guadalajara. Born in the United States, he represents the Mexico national team.

Álvarez was included in The Guardian's "Next Generation 2019".

== Club career ==
=== LA Galaxy II ===
Born in Los Angeles, California, Álvarez signed with LA Galaxy II of the United Soccer League on August 2, 2017. In signing with the side, Álvarez became the youngest signing in USL history, ahead of the previous holder Alphonso Davies, at 15 years, one month, and 14 days. Álvarez made his professional debut for LA Galaxy II on October 7, against Portland Timbers 2, he came on as a 46th-minute substitute for Adrian Vera as LA Galaxy II won 3–2. In playing, Álvarez became the youngest player to ever play a USL match.

Álvarez was moved to parent club LA Galaxy ahead of their 2018 season, but was loaned back to the reserve team.

=== LA Galaxy ===
Álvarez made his senior team debut on March 2, 2019, and assisted on a goal during a 2–1 victory over the Chicago Fire. On September 2, 2020, Álvarez scored his first MLS goal against the Portland Timbers, the first in a 3–2 win.

=== Tijuana ===
On 8 September 2023, Álvarez joined Liga MX club Tijuana. He made his debut shortly after in Tijuana's 2–1 victory over Toluca on September 15, 2023, being substituted in for Eduardo Armenta in the 90th minute.

=== Guadalajara ===
On May 31, 2025, Guadalajara reached a 4-year agreement to sign Álvarez for a reported fee of $8 million, with an option to extend one more year. Prior to the start of the season, it was announced Álvarez would wear the number 10 jersey. Álvarez made his debut with the club on July 19 on 2nd Matchday of the Apertura against León, coming on a substitute on the 68th minute for Cade Cowell in a 1–0 loss. On August 22, Álvarez scored his first goal with Chivas in a 3–3 away tie against his former club, Tijuana, the second for his side from a free-kick, which won Goal of the Year award.

== International career ==
Álvarez was eligible to play for the United States or Mexico, having been born in the United States to Mexican parents. He currently represents Mexico at the senior level after playing for the United States at the U-15 youth level, and once stated, "I'm not closing the door on anyone. I could still play for the U.S. or I could keep playing for Mexico. But I'm with Mexico right now and that's my focus."

Álvarez originally represented the United States U15's. In April 2016, he served as their captain at the 2016 International Festival of Fútbol in Rosario, Argentina, starting all three matches and leading the United States to the title. In the opening match against Talleres de Córdoba, Álvarez scored three goals and assisted two more goals in a 5–1 victory. He also scored against Uruguay U15s in a 2–0 win. In June 2016, Álvarez was again called to the United States U15s, for a four-team tournament in Zagreb, Croatia in which he made one start against Croatia U15s.

Álvarez began playing for Mexico U15's in September 2016. He scored a brace for them in a friendly 7–0 win over the Cayman Islands U17 on August 11, 2017. He also represented the Mexico U15s in their championship-winning run at the 2017 CONCACAF Boys' Under-15 Championship, and provided the game-winning assist against his previous team, the United States U15s.

Álvarez debuted for the Mexico U17's team in a 1–0 win over the Argentina U17's, and scored the only goal in the match. He was included in the roster that would participate at the 2019 U-17 World Cup. He scored four goals in the tournament, scoring the winning goal from a free-kick in the semi-final against the Netherlands as Mexico finished runner-up against Brazil.

In November 2020, Álvarez was called up to the United States national team for a friendly match in Fort Lauderdale against El Salvador. However, he did not receive any playing minutes in that match due to not having yet filed a one-time switch to FIFA in order to officially play for the United States.

In March 2021, Álvarez was called up to the Mexico national team for friendly matches against Wales and Costa Rica. On March 30, he made his debut with the national team against Costa Rica, coming on as a substitute for Jesús Manuel Corona during the second half for a 1–0 victory. In June 2021, Álvarez confirmed his commitment to Mexico over overtures to play for the United States. A few days later, he replaced the injured Rodolfo Pizarro on the upcoming 2021 CONCACAF Gold Cup squad. On July 10, 2021, his appearance as a substitute against Trinidad and Tobago permanently cap-tied him to Mexico. In May 2022, Álvarez was included in the under-21 roster that participated in the 2022 Maurice Revello Tournament, scoring two goals, Mexico finished third.

On May 31, 2024, in a friendly match against Bolivia, Álvarez scored his first goal with Mexico in a 1–0 victory. Álvarez was included in the Mexico national team roster by Javier Aguirre to participate at the 2025 CONCACAF Nations League Finals and the 2025 CONCACAF Gold Cup, where Mexico won both competitions.

== Personal life ==
Efraín is the younger brother of professional soccer player Carlos Alvarez.

== Career statistics ==
=== Club ===
As of match played on 8 November 2026

Club	Season	League			Cup		Continental		Other		Total	
Club	Season	Division	Apps	Goals	Apps	Goals	Apps	Goals	Apps	Goals	Apps	Goals
LA Galaxy II	2017	USL	1	0	—		—		—		1	0
LA Galaxy II	2018	USL	17	12	—		—		—		17	12
LA Galaxy II	2019	USL	2	1	—		—		—		2	1
LA Galaxy II	Total		20	13	—		—		—		20	13
LA Galaxy	2019	MLS	14	0	2	2	—		2 (Note: Appearances in Leagues Cup)	0	18	2
LA Galaxy	2020	MLS	16	1	—		—		—		16	1
LA Galaxy	2021	MLS	26	2	—		—		—		26	2
LA Galaxy	2022	MLS	29	3	4	0	—		—		33	3
LA Galaxy	2023	MLS	10	0	—		—		1	0	11	0
LA Galaxy	Total		95	6	6	2	—		3	0	104	8
Tijuana	2023–24	Liga MX	18	3	—		—		—		18	3
Tijuana	2024–25	Liga MX	34	5	—		—		2	0	36	5
Tijuana	Total		52	8	—		—		2	0	54	8
Guadalajara	2025–26	Liga MX	40	3	—		—		3	1	43	4
Guadalajara	2026–27	Liga MX	15	1	—		—		2	0	17	1
Guadalajara	Total		55	4	—		—		5	1	60	5
Career total			222	31	6	2	0	0	10	1	238	34

=== International ===
As of match played on 25 February 2026

National team	Year	Apps	Goals
Mexico	2021	4	0
Mexico	2022	0	0
Mexico	2023	0	0
Mexico	2024	1	1
Mexico	2025	1	0
Mexico	2026	1	0
Total		7	1

==== International goals ====
Scores and results list Mexico's goal tally first.

No.	Date	Venue	Opponent	Score	Result	Competition
1.	31 May 2024	Soldier Field, Chicago, United States	Bolivia	1–0	1–0	Friendly

== Honors ==
Mexico U17

- CONCACAF U-17 Championship: 2019
- FIFA U-17 World Cup runner-up: 2019

Mexico

- CONCACAF Gold Cup: 2025
- CONCACAF Nations League: 2024–25

Individual

- USL Championship Young Player of the Year: 2018
- IFFHS CONCACAF Youth Best XI: 2021
- Liga MX Goal of the Year: 2025–26
