= 2023 LA Galaxy season =

American soccer club season

LA Galaxy
2023 season
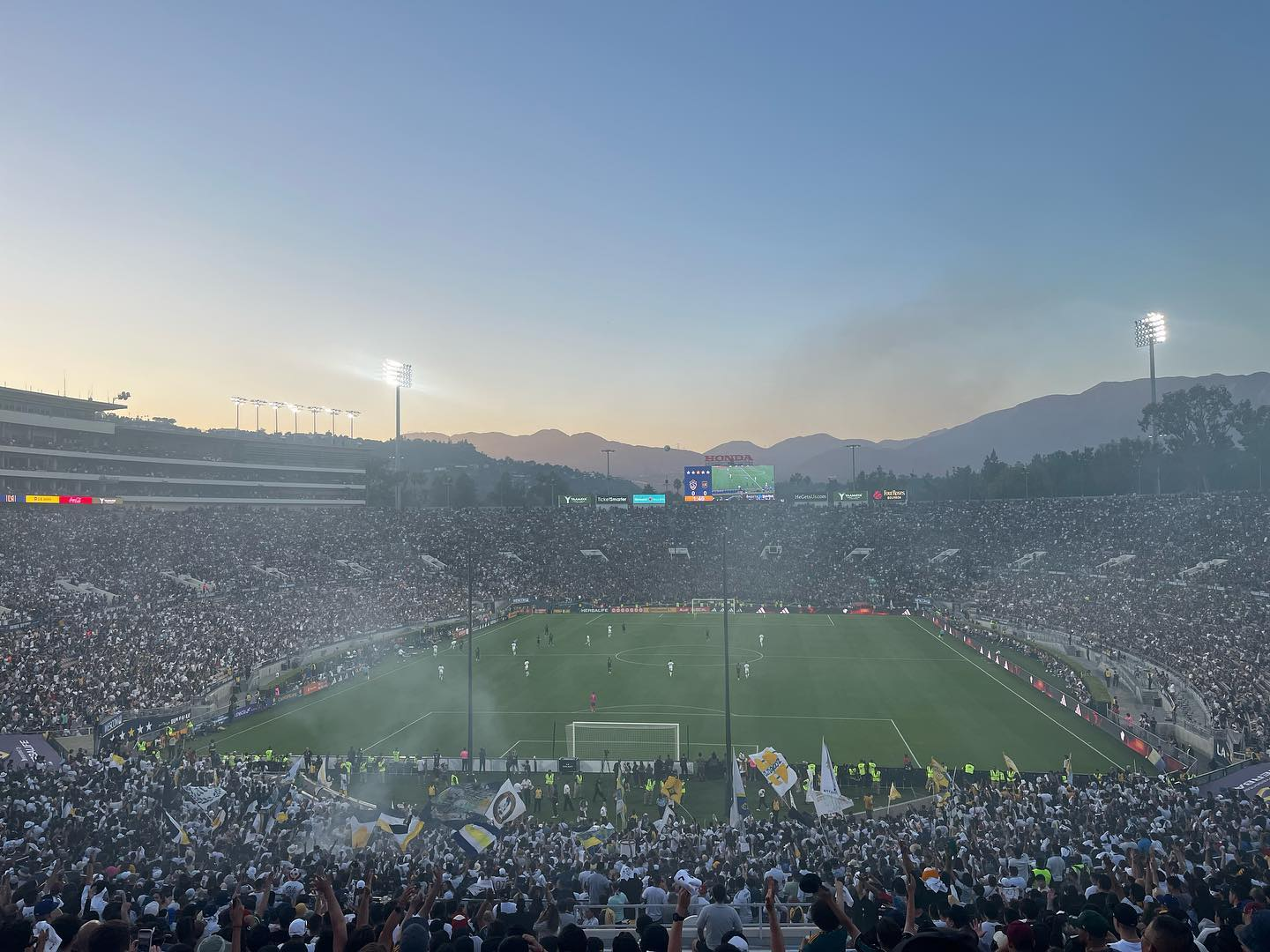
- An El Trafico match at the Rose Bowl - July 4th, 2023
- Owner: Philip Anschutz (AEG)
- Head coach: Greg Vanney
- Stadium: Dignity Health Sports Park
- MLS: Conference: 13th Overall: 26th
- MLS Cup Playoffs: Did not qualify
- U.S. Open Cup: Quarter-finals
- Leagues Cup: Group stage
- Top goalscorer: League: Tyler Boyd; Preston Judd (3 goals each); All: Tyler Boyd (4 goals)
- Average home league attendance: 24,106
Home colors	Away colors

The 2023 LA Galaxy season was the club's 28th season in Major League Soccer, the top tier of the American soccer pyramid. LA Galaxy played their home matches at Dignity Health Sports Park in the LA suburbs of Carson, California. This season marked the club's 20th anniversary, of their home soccer-specific stadium. The Galaxy had commemorated their stadium's anniversary. The Galaxy failed to make the playoffs for the second year in a row.

== Squad information ==
As of August 8, 2023

Note: Flags indicate national team as defined under FIFA eligibility rules; some limited exceptions apply. Players may hold more than one non-FIFA nationality.

No.	Pos.	Nation	Player
1	GK	ENG	Jonathan Bond
2	DF	BRA	Lucas Calegari (on loan from Fluminense)
3	DF	ARG	Julián Aude
4	DF	JPN	Maya Yoshida
5	MF	URU	Gastón Brugman
6	MF	ESP	Riqui Puig
7	MF	MEX	Efraín Álvarez
8	MF	USA	Mark Delgado
9	FW	SRB	Dejan Joveljić
10	MF	BRA	Douglas Costa
11	MF	USA	Tyler Boyd
12	FW	COL	Michael Barrios
14	FW	MEX	Javier Hernández
15	DF	ESA	Eriq Zavaleta
16	MF	ESP	Uri Rosell
17	DF	COD	Chris Mavinga
18	DF	SUR	Kelvin Leerdam

No.	Pos.	Nation	Player
19	DF	USA	Mauricio Cuevas
20	MF	USA	Edwin Cerrillo
21	FW	URU	Diego Fagúndez
22	DF	URU	Martín Cáceres
24	DF	USA	Jalen Neal
27	FW	ENG	Billy Sharp
28	DF	USA	Marcus Ferkranus
30	MF	CRC	Gino Vivi
31	FW	USA	Preston Judd
33	GK	USA	Jonathan Klinsmann
35	GK	SRB	Novak Mićović (on loan from Čukarički)
37	MF	USA	Daniel Aguirre
43	MF	USA	Adam Saldaña
44	MF	CAN	Raheem Edwards
56	MF	MEX	Jonathan Perez
93	DF	MEX	Tony Alfaro

=== Transfers ===
==== Transfers in ====
Pos.	Player	Transferred from	Fee/notes	Date	Source
DF	(Democratic Republic of the Congo) Chris Mavinga	(Canada) Toronto FC	Free agent	January 5, 2023	
MF	(United States) Memo Rodríguez	(United States) Houston Dynamo FC	Free agent	January 5, 2023	
MF	(United States) Tyler Boyd	(Turkey) Beşiktaş	Free agent	February 20, 2023	
DM	(Spain) Uri Rosell	(United States) Sporting Kansas City	Free agent	February 22, 2023	
DF	(Brazil) Lucas Calegari	(Brazil) Fluminense	Loan	February 27, 2023	
DF	(Argentina) Julián Aude	(Argentina) Lanús	Transfer	March 21, 2023	
GK	(Serbia) Novak Mićović	(Serbia) FK Čukarički	Loan	March 31, 2023	
MF	(Costa Rica) Gino Vivi		2023 MLS SuperDraft pick	April 24, 2023	
DF	(United States) Mauricio Cuevas	(Belgium) Club NXT	Transfer	April 26, 2023	
MF	(Mexico) Adrián González	(United States) LA Galaxy II	Short-term agreement	June 23, 2023	
DF	(Mexico) Tony Alfaro	(United States) New York City FC	Trade	July 11, 2023	
MF	(Uruguay) Diego Fagúndez	(United States) Austin FC	Trade	August 1, 2023	
FW	(Colombia) Michael Barrios	(United States) Colorado Rapids	Trade	August 3, 2023	
DF	(Japan) Maya Yoshida	(Germany) Schalke 04	Free agent	August 3, 2023	
MF	(United States) Edwin Cerrillo	(United States) FC Dallas	Trade	August 3, 2023	
FW	(England) Billy Sharp	(England) Sheffield United	Free agent	August 15, 2023	

==== Transfers out ====
Pos.	Player	Transferred to	Fee/notes	Date	Source
DF	(United States) Cameron Dunbar	(United States) Minnesota United FC	Trade	November 7, 2022	
DF	(Republic of Ireland) Derrick Williams	(United States) D.C. United	Trade	November 10, 2022	
GK	(Mexico) Richard Sánchez	(United States) Hartford Athletic	Released	November 14, 2022	
DF	(United States) Jorge Villafaña		Released	November 14, 2022	
MF	(United States) Sacha Kljestan	None	Retired	November 14, 2022	
MF	(Spain) Víctor Vázquez	(Canada) Toronto FC	Re-Entry Draft Stage Two	November 22, 2022	
FW	(France) Kévin Cabral	(United States) Colorado Rapids	Trade	December 8, 2022	
DF	(United States) Nick DePuy	(United States) Nashville SC	Trade	January 5, 2023	
MF	(France) Samuel Grandsir	(France) Le Havre	Transfer	January 23, 2023	
MF	(Panama) Carlos Harvey	(United States) Phoenix Rising FC	Transfer	February 7, 2023	
DF	(Mexico) Julián Araujo	(Spain) FC Barcelona	Transfer	February 17, 2023	
DF	(United States) Chase Gasper	(United States) Houston Dynamo	Released	April 13, 2023	
DF	(France) Séga Coulibaly		Released	June 30, 2023	
MF	(United States) Memo Rodríguez	(United States) Austin FC	Trade	August 1, 2023	
MF	(Mexico) Efraín Álvarez	(Mexico) Tijuana	Transfer	September 8, 2023	

==== Draft picks ====
Draft picks are not automatically signed to the team roster. Only those who are signed to a contract will be listed as transfers in.

Date	Player	Position	College	Pick	Source
December 21, 2022	(Costa Rica) Gino Vivi	MF	University of Central Florida	23	
December 21, 2022	(United States) Russell Shealy	GK	Syracuse University	52	

== Competitions ==
=== Preseason ===
The preseason schedule was announced on December 15, 2022.

January 24, 2023	LA Galaxy	3–2	D.C. United	Carson, California
12:00 pm PT	Puig; Álvarez; Judd		Ku-DiPietro; Santos	Stadium: Dignity Health Sports Park
Note: Closed door scrimmage

January 27, 2023	LA Galaxy	1–1	Charlotte FC	Carson, California
11:00 am PT	Puig (pen.)			Stadium: Dignity Health Sports Park
Note: Closed door scrimmage

February 4, 2023	LA Galaxy	1–2	New York City FC	Carson, California
7:00 pm PT	Coulibaly (yellow card) 30'; Hernández 51'; Leerdam (yellow card) 63'; Puig (yellow card) 74'	Report	O'Toole (yellow card) 26'; Thiago Andrade 37'; Morales (yellow card) 53'; Denis 83'	Stadium: Dignity Health Sports Park; Referee: Timothy Ford

February 8, 2023 Coachella Valley Invitational	LA Galaxy	4–1	St. Louis City SC	Indio, California
11:00 am PT	Delgado 32'; Joveljić 52'; Alvarez 66' (pen.), 78'	Report	Stroud 13'	Stadium: Empire Polo Club

February 12, 2023 Coachella Valley Invitational	LA Galaxy	1–4	Portland Timbers	Indio, California
10:30 am PT	Boyd 55'	Report	Evander 35', (yellow card) 41'; Williamson (yellow card) 39'; Paredes 46'; Mosquera 61'; Niezgoda 69'	Stadium: Empire Polo Club

February 15, 2023 Coachella Valley Invitational	LA Galaxy	0–1	New York Red Bulls	Indio, California
10:30 am PT		Report	Harper 50'	Stadium: Empire Polo Club

February 18, 2023	LA Galaxy	2–1	Toronto FC	Carson, California
7:30 pm PT	Álvarez 27'; Delgado (yellow card) 47', (goal) 52'; Mavinga (yellow card) 50'	Report	Kaye (yellow card) 30'; Bradley (yellow card) 45+1'; Osorio (yellow card) 65'; Laryea (yellow card) 83'; Akinola 89'	Stadium: Dignity Health Sports Park; Referee: Ramy Touchan

=== Major League Soccer ===
==== Standings ====
===== Overall =====
Overall MLS standings table
Pos	Team	Pld	W	L	T	GF	GA	GD	Pts	Qualification
24	Chicago Fire FC	34	10	14	10	39	51	−12	40	
25	Austin FC	34	10	15	9	49	55	−6	39	
26	LA Galaxy	34	8	14	12	51	67	−16	36	
27	Inter Miami CF (L)	34	9	18	7	41	54	−13	34	Qualification for the CONCACAF Champions Cup round of 16 (Note: As 2023 Leagues Cup champions)
28	Colorado Rapids	34	5	17	12	26	54	−28	27	

Source: MLS
Rules for classification: 1) points; 2) total wins; 3) total goal differential; 4) total goals scored; 5) fewer disciplinary points; 6) away goal differential; 7) away goals scored; 8) home goals differential; 9) home goals scored; 10) coin toss (2 clubs tied) or drawing of lots (≥3 clubs tied)
(L) Leagues Cup winner

===== Western Conference =====
MLS Western Conference table (2023)
Pos	Team	Pld	W	L	T	GF	GA	GD	Pts
10	Portland Timbers	34	11	13	10	46	58	−12	43
11	Minnesota United FC	34	10	13	11	46	51	−5	41
12	Austin FC	34	10	15	9	49	55	−6	39
13	LA Galaxy	34	8	14	12	51	67	−16	36
14	Colorado Rapids	34	5	17	12	26	54	−28	27

Source: MLS
Rules for classification: 1) points; 2) total wins; 3) total goal differential; 4) total goals scored; 5) fewer disciplinary points; 6) away goal differential; 7) away goals scored; 8) home goals differential; 9) home goals scored; 10) coin toss (2 clubs tied) or drawing of lots (≥3 clubs tied)

==== Results summary ====
Overall								Home						Away					
Pld	Pts	W	L	T	GF	GA	GD	W	L	T	GF	GA	GD	W	L	T	GF	GA	GD
34	36	8	14	12	51	67	−16	6	5	6	31	29	+2	2	9	6	20	38	−18

Last updated: October 7, 2023
Source: MLS Results
Pld = Matches played; Pts = Points; W = Matches won; T = Matches tied; L = Matches lost; GF = Goals for; GA = Goals against; GD = Goal difference

Round	1	2	3	4	5	6	7	8	9	10	11	12	13	14	15	16	17	18	19	20	21	22	23	24	25	26	27	28	29	30	31	32	33	34
Stadium	A	A	H	A	H	A	H	H	A	H	H	A	A	H	A	A	H	A	A	H	H	A	H	A	H	H	A	H	A	H	A	A	H	H
Result	L	D	D	D	L	L	L	W	L	L	W	L	L	L	W	D	D	D	D	W	W	L	W	W	D	D	L	W	D	D	L	L	D	L

Updated to match(es) played on October 14, 2023. Source: Match reports
A = Away; H = Home; W = Win; D = Draw; L = Loss; P = Postponed

==== Regular season ====
The full schedule was released on December 20, 2022.

All times in Pacific Time.

=== March ===
March 4, 2023 1	FC Dallas	3–1	LA Galaxy	Frisco, Texas
5:30 p.m.	Velasco 45+2', (yellow card) 72'; Cerrillo (yellow card) 54'; Ferreira 56', 64'; Obrian (yellow card) 90+1'; Geovane Jesus (yellow card) 90+7'	Report	Joveljić 35'; Delgado (yellow card) 41'; Leerdam (yellow card) 58'; Judd (yellow card) 90+9'	Stadium: Toyota Stadium; Attendance: 19,906; Referee: Timothy Ford

March 11, 2023 2	Sporting Kansas City	0–0	LA Galaxy	Kansas City, Kansas
5:30 p.m.		Report		Stadium: Children's Mercy Park; Attendance: 18,612; Referee: Armando Villarreal

March 18, 2023 3	LA Galaxy	1–1	Vancouver Whitecaps FC	Carson, California
7:30 p.m.	Leerdam 45+4'; Edwards (yellow card) 90+3'	Report	Blackmon 14'; Veselinović (yellow card) 17'; Brown (yellow card) 43'; Raposo (yellow card) 71'; Laborda (yellow card) 87'	Stadium: Dignity Health Sports Park; Attendance: 23,112; Referee: Victor Rivas

March 25, 2023 4	Portland Timbers	0–0	LA Galaxy	Portland, Oregon
1:30 p.m.	Fogaça (yellow card) 38'; Pablo Bonilla (yellow card) 55'; Bravo (yellow card) 66'	Report	Puig (yellow card) 45+4'; Calegari (yellow card) 48'; Boyd (yellow card) 60'; Rodríguez (yellow card) 69'; Neal (yellow card) 82'	Stadium: Providence Park; Attendance: 24,077; Referee: Chris Penso

=== April ===
April 1, 2023 5	LA Galaxy	1–2	Seattle Sounders FC	Carson, California
4:30 p.m.	Delgado (yellow card) 58'; Neal 63'; Cáceres (yellow card) 90+5'	Report	Morris 21'; Léo Chú 35'; Ragen (yellow card) 61'; João Paulo (yellow card) 73'; Lodeiro (yellow card) 85'	Stadium: Dignity Health Sports Park; Attendance: 22,008; Referee: Allen Chapman

April 8, 2023 6	Houston Dynamo FC	3–0	LA Galaxy	Houston
5:30 p.m.	Herrera (yellow card) 27' (yellow-red card) 90+5', (goal) 35'; Bassi (yellow card) 42', (goal) 65' (pen.), 73'; Caicedo (yellow card) 77'	Report	Cáceres (yellow card) 34' (yellow-red card) 63'; Edwards (yellow card) 61'; Brugman (yellow card) 64'; Costa (red card) 90+7'	Stadium: Shell Energy Stadium; Attendance: 19,128; Referee: Alex Chilowicz

April 16, 2023 7	LA Galaxy	2–3	Los Angeles FC	Carson, California
1:30 p.m.	Boyd 41'; Aude (yellow card) 73'; Delgado 84'; Puig (yellow card) 90'; Joveljić (yellow card) 90+4'	Report	Acosta (yellow card) 19'; Vela 22', 68' (pen.); Palacios (yellow card) 60'; Cifuentes (yellow card) 63'; Hollingshead 70'; Palenica (yellow card) 90+1'	Stadium: Dignity Health Sports Park; Attendance: 27,154; Referee: Armando Villarreal

April 22, 2023 8	LA Galaxy	2–0	Austin FC	Carson, California
7:30 p.m.	Puig (yellow card) 3', (goal) 64'; Hernández 54', (yellow card) 90+1'; Boyd (yellow card) 61'; Aguirre (yellow card) 90+4'	Report	Urruti (yellow card) 40'; Väisänen (yellow card) 43'; Ring (yellow card) 90+1'	Stadium: Dignity Health Sports Park; Attendance: 18,875; Referee: Chris Penso

April 29, 2023 9	Orlando City SC	2–0	LA Galaxy	Orlando, Florida
4:30 p.m.	Kara 38'; Torres 57'	Report	Aude (yellow card) 37'; Brugman (yellow card) 59'; Zavaleta (yellow card) 73'	Stadium: Exploria Stadium; Attendance: 22,519; Referee: Jon Freemon

=== May ===
May 6, 2023 10	LA Galaxy	1–3	Colorado Rapids	Carson, California
7:30 p.m.	Aude (yellow card) 45+1'; Judd 89'; Neal (yellow card) 90+4'	Report	Abubakar 14'; Cabral (yellow card) 28', (goal) 65'; Nicholson (yellow card) 52'; Lewis 81'	Stadium: Dignity Health Sports Park; Attendance: 19,101; Referee: Ramy Touchan

May 14, 2023 11	LA Galaxy	2–1	San Jose Earthquakes	Carson, California
6:30 p.m.	Hernández (yellow card) 27'; Delgado (yellow card) 35'; Cáceres 60'; Joveljić 90+1', (yellow card) 90+1'	Report	Rodrigues (yellow card) 46'; Mensah (yellow card) 73'; Judson (yellow card) 82'; Bouda (yellow card) 89', (goal) 90+4'	Stadium: Dignity Health Sports Park; Attendance: 16,035; Referee: Joe Dickerson

May 17, 2023 12	Columbus Crew	2–0	LA Galaxy	Columbus, Ohio
4:30 p.m.	Zelarayán 25'; Amundsen 43'; Ramirez (yellow card) 46'	Report	Puig (yellow card) 82'; Hernández (yellow card) 88'	Stadium: Lower.com Field; Attendance: 20,192; Referee: Ted Unkel

May 20, 2023 13	D.C. United	3–0	LA Galaxy	Washington, D.C.
4:30 p.m.	Pines (yellow card) 65'; Benteke 71'; Dájome 73', (yellow card) 90'; Klich 80'	Report	Rodríguez (yellow card) 45+1'; Delgado (yellow card) 87'	Stadium: Audi Field; Attendance: 19,215; Referee: Fotis Bazakos

May 27, 2023 14	LA Galaxy	0–1	Charlotte FC	Carson, California
7:30 p.m.	Hernández (yellow card) 46' (yellow-red card) 85'	Report	Afful (yellow card) 56'; Świderski 73'; Vargas (yellow card) 79'	Stadium: Dignity Health Sports Park; Attendance: 17,434; Referee: Drew Fischer

May 31, 2023 15	Real Salt Lake	2–3	LA Galaxy	Sandy, Utah
6:30 p.m.	Musovski 51', (yellow card) 57'; Gómez (yellow card) 54'; Brody (yellow card) 64'; Ruiz 67', (yellow card) 83'	Report	Brugman 45+4' (pen.); Edwards (yellow card) 66'; Rodríguez 72'; Boyd 74'	Stadium: America First Field; Attendance: 17,762; Referee: Ismir Pekmic

=== June ===
June 11, 2023 16	St. Louis City SC	1–1	LA Galaxy	St. Louis
10:00 a.m.	Löwen (yellow card) 8'; Blom (yellow card) 40'; Alm (yellow card) 45+4'; Gioacchini 68'; Ostrák (yellow card) 83'	Report	Brugman (yellow card) 52'; Neal (yellow card) 54'; Aguirre 85'	Stadium: CityPark; Attendance: 22,423; Referee: Victor Rivas

June 21, 2023 17	LA Galaxy	2–2	Sporting Kansas City	Carson, California
7:30 p.m.	Cáceres 24'; Judd 64'; Aguirre (yellow card) 90'	Report	Pulido 12', 90+1' (pen.); Thommy (yellow card) 17'; Rosero (yellow card) 23'	Stadium: Dignity Health Sports Park; Attendance: 20,960; Referee: Filip Dujic

June 24, 2023 18	Colorado Rapids	0–0	LA Galaxy	Commerce City, Colorado
6:30 p.m.	Bassett (yellow card) 74'; Rosenberry (yellow card) 76'	Report	Puig (yellow card) 80'	Stadium: Dick's Sporting Goods Park; Attendance: 16,082; Referee: Lukasz Szpala

=== July ===
July 1, 2023 19	San Jose Earthquakes	2–2	LA Galaxy	Stanford, California
7:30 p.m.	Espinoza (yellow card) 20', (goal) 81'; Skahan 42'; Tsakiris (yellow card) 57'; Yueill (yellow card) 90+4'	Report	Edwards 31', (yellow card) 40'; Judd 47'; Calegari (yellow card) 78'; Aude (yellow card) 90+8'	Stadium: Stanford Stadium; Attendance: 42,823; Referee: Ramy Touchan

July 4, 2023 20	LA Galaxy	2–1	Los Angeles FC	Pasadena, California
7:30 p.m.	Boyd 26'; Edwards (yellow card) 34'; Costa (yellow card) 54'; Aude (yellow card) 72'; Puig 73'	Report	Tillman (yellow card) 19'; Sánchez 57'; Maldonado (yellow card) 70'; Dueñas (yellow card) 82'	Stadium: Rose Bowl; Attendance: 82,110; Referee: Victor Rivas
Note: Match rescheduled from February 25 due to inclement weather in the Los Angeles Area.

July 8, 2023 21	LA Galaxy	3–1	Philadelphia Union	Carson, California
7:30 p.m.	Boyd 15'; Mbaizo 45+1' (o.g.); Judd (yellow card) 45+2'; Costa (yellow card) 68'; Joveljic (yellow card) 70'; Puig 76'	Report	Martínez (yellow card) 5'; Uhre 36'; Bedoya (yellow card) 37'; Gazdag (yellow card) 88'	Stadium: Dignity Health Sports Park; Attendance: 21,269; Referee: Fotis Bazakos

July 15, 2023 22	Vancouver Whitecaps FC	4–2	LA Galaxy	Vancouver
7:30 p.m.	White 2'; Gauld 10', 23' (pen.); Schöpf (yellow card) 48'; Córdova 90+4'	Report	Mavinga (yellow card) 9' (yellow-red card) 22'; Puig (yellow card) 23'; Brugman 61'; Delgado 74'	Stadium: BC Place; Attendance: 18,354; Referee: Joe Dickerson

=== August ===
August 26, 2023 23	LA Galaxy	3–0	Chicago Fire FC	Carson, California
7:30 p.m.	Boyd 29'; Puig 72'; Sharp 90' (pen.)	Report	Giménez (yellow card) 2' (yellow-red card) 27'; Dean (yellow card) 89'	Stadium: Dignity Health Sports Park; Attendance: 19,762; Referee: Ismail Elfath

August 30, 2023 24	San Jose Earthquakes	2–3	LA Galaxy	San Jose, California
7:30 p.m.	Rodrigues (yellow card) 19'; Calegari 29' (o.g.); Ebobisse 31'; Akapo (yellow card) 43'; Trauco (yellow card) 65'; Gruezo (yellow card) 75'; Marie (yellow card) 90+2'	Report	Boyd 16'; Puig 50'; Joveljić 61' (pen.); Cerrillo (yellow card) 83'; Aude (yellow card) 90+9'	Stadium: PayPal Park; Attendance: 16,224; Referee: Lukasz Szpala

=== September ===
September 2, 2023 25	LA Galaxy	0–0	Houston Dynamo FC	Carson, California
7:30 p.m.	Edwards (yellow card) 34'	Report	Steres (yellow card) 38'; Caicedo (yellow card) 55'; Quiñónes (yellow card) 64'; Artur (yellow card) 90+8'	Stadium: Dignity Health Sports Park; Attendance: 20,035; Referee: Armando Villarreal

September 10, 2023 26	LA Galaxy	2–2	St. Louis City SC	Carson, California
5:00 p.m.	Mavinga (yellow card) 50'; Puig 53' (pen.); Sharp 82'; Cuevas (yellow card) 90+3'	Report	Adeniran 4', (yellow card) 52' (yellow-red card) 60'; Nilsson (yellow card) 22'; Klauss 28'; Markanich (yellow card) 82'; Hiebert (yellow card) 85'	Stadium: Dignity Health Sports Park; Attendance: 19,554; Referee: Filip Dujic
Note: Match rescheduled from July 4 due to rescheduling of the Rose Bowl El Tráfico match.

September 16, 2023 27	Los Angeles FC	4–2	LA Galaxy	Los Angeles
7:30 p.m.	Sánchez (yellow card) 7'; Palacios (yellow card) 13'; Bouanga 24', 75'; Hollingshead 33', (yellow card) 66'; Tillman 84'; Acosta (yellow card) 90'	Report	Sharp 25'; Cuevas (yellow card) 43'; Yoshida 59'	Stadium: BMO Stadium; Attendance: 22,132; Referee: Chris Penso

September 20, 2023 28	LA Galaxy	4–3	Minnesota United FC	Carson, California
7:30 p.m.	Sharp 16', 63', 71', (yellow card) 67'; Boyd (yellow card) 54'; Delgado (yellow card) 81'; Fagúndez 82'; Edwards (yellow card) 90+1'	Report	Pukki 19'; Tapias (yellow card) 27'; Greguš (yellow card) 28'; Boxall (yellow card) 29'; Hlongwane 41', 45+5'; Bristow (yellow card) 54' (yellow-red card) 74'; Tajouri-Shradi (yellow card) 88'	Stadium: Dignity Health Sports Park; Attendance: 16,120; Referee: Rosendo Mendoza

September 24, 2023 29	Austin FC	3–3	LA Galaxy	Austin, Texas
9:30 p.m.	Gallagher (yellow card) 3'; Ring 11'; Väisänen (yellow card) 30'; Finlay 45+6'; Rigoni 75'	Report	Puig 45+2' (pen.); Cerrillo (yellow card) 84'; Joveljić 89'; Barrios 90+4'	Stadium: Q2 Stadium; Attendance: 20,738; Referee: Ted Unkel
Note: Match delayed from 6:30 p.m. due to weather conditions

September 30, 2023 30	LA Galaxy	3–3	Portland Timbers	Carson, California
7:30 p.m.	Zavaleta 10', 45+1'; Delgado (yellow card) 13'; Costa 43'; Yoshida (yellow card) 54'	Report	Moreno 5', (yellow card) 62'; Zavaleta 38' (o.g.); Mora 76'	Stadium: Dignity Health Sports Park; Attendance: 23,101; Referee: Joseph Dickerson

=== October ===
October 4, 2023 31	Seattle Sounders FC	2–1	LA Galaxy	Seattle
7:30 p.m.	Morris 9'; Roldan 90+6'	Report	Leerdam (yellow card) 38'; Costa 54'	Stadium: Lumen Field; Attendance: 30,495; Referee: Victor Rivas

October 7, 2023 32	Minnesota United FC	5–2	LA Galaxy	Saint Paul, Minnesota
5:30 p.m.	Dotson 33'; Pukki 45', 60', 67', 76'	Report	Boyd 41'; Yoshida (yellow card) 50'; Joveljić 82'	Stadium: Allianz Field; Attendance: 19,693; Referee: Timothy Ford

October 14, 2023 33	LA Galaxy	2–2	Real Salt Lake	Carson, California
7:30 p.m.	Joveljić 7'; Costa 34'; Alfaro (yellow card) 66'; Aguirre (yellow card) 75'	Report	Julio 45+1'; Eneli (yellow card) 54'; Luna 76'	Stadium: Dignity Health Sports Park; Attendance: 20,673; Referee: Jair Marrufo
Note: Match rescheduled from August 20 due to Hurricane Hilary making landfall in Southern California.

October 21, 2023 34	LA Galaxy	1–4	FC Dallas	Carson, California
6:00 p.m.	Edwards 24', (yellow card) 45+5'; Cerrillo (yellow card) 45+1'; Yoshida (yellow card) 73'; Pérez (yellow card) 79'	Report	Kamungo 4', 30'; Twumasi 12'; Obrian 45+2'; Illarramendi (yellow card) 70'	Stadium: Dignity Health Sports Park; Attendance: 22,491; Referee: Victor Rivas

=== Leagues Cup ===
==== West 3 ====
Pos	Team	Pld	W	PW	PL	L	GF	GA	GD	Pts	Qualification	LEO	VAN	LAX
1	(Mexico) León	2	1	1	0	0	3	2	+1	5	Advance to knockout stage	—	—	—
2	(Canada) Vancouver Whitecaps FC	2	1	0	1	0	4	3	+1	4	Advance to knockout stage	2–2	—	—
3	(United States) LA Galaxy	2	0	0	0	2	1	3	−2	0		0–1	1–2	—

Source: Leagues Cup
Rules for classification: Tiebreakers

July 26, 2023 Group stage	LA Galaxy (United States)	0–1	(Mexico) León	Carson, California
7:30 PM PDT	Edwards (yellow card) 71'	Report	Barreiro (yellow card) 38'; Mena 58'; Romero (yellow card) 87'	Stadium: Dignity Health Sports Park; Attendance: 20,776; Referee: Juan Calderón

July 30, 2023 Group stage	LA Galaxy (United States)	1–2	(Canada) Vancouver Whitecaps FC	Carson, California
6:00 PM PDT	Puig 16'; Costa (yellow card) 48'	Report	Cubas (yellow card) 42'; Calegari 81' (o.g.); White 90+1'	Stadium: Dignity Health Sports Park; Attendance: 14,787; Referee: Walter López Castellanos

=== U.S. Open Cup ===
==== Round of 32 ====
The draw for the round of 32 was held on April 27, 2023.

May 10, 2023	LA Galaxy (California)	3–1	(Washington (state)) Seattle Sounders FC	Carson, California
7:30 p.m.	Aude 4'; Hernández (yellow card) 41'; Rodríguez 66', 84'; Edwards (yellow card) 80'; Brugman (yellow card) 87'	Report	Baker (yellow card) 54'; Rothrock 68'; João Paulo (yellow card) 86'	Stadium: Dignity Health Sports Park; Attendance: 8,412; Referee: Matt Geringer

==== Round of 16 ====
The draw for the round of 16 was held on May 11, 2023.

May 23, 2023	Los Angeles FC (California)	0–2	(California) LA Galaxy	Los Angeles, California
7:30 p.m.	Crisostomo (yellow card) 36'; Dueñas (yellow card) 56'; Gaines (yellow card) 76'	Report	Calegari (yellow card) 29'; Rodríguez (yellow card) 41'; Boyd 49'; Puig 52', (yellow card) 53'	Stadium: BMO Stadium; Attendance: 16,362; Referee: Allen Chapman

==== Quarterfinals ====
June 7, 2023	Real Salt Lake (Utah)	3–2	(California) LA Galaxy	Sandy, Utah
6:30 p.m. PDT	Kreilach 19', 45+7' (pen.), (yellow card) 56'; Glad (yellow card) 32'; Savarino 51'; Eneli (yellow card) 61'	Report	Neal (yellow card) 59'; Brugman 82' (pen.); Costa 84'	Stadium: America First Field; Attendance: 20,712; Referee: Ramy Touchan
