= Martín Cáceres =

Uruguayan footballer (born 1987)

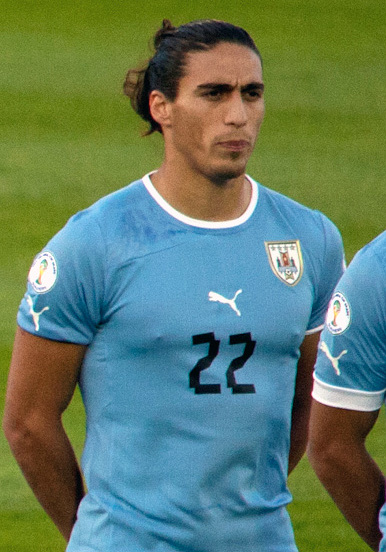
- Cáceres with Uruguay in 2011

Personal information
- Full name: José Martín Cáceres Silva
- Date of birth: 7 April 1987 (age 39)
- Place of birth: Montevideo, Uruguay
- Height: 1.80 m (5 ft 11 in)
- Position: Defender

Team information
- Current team: Juventud
- Number: 4

Youth career
- Defensor

Senior career*
Years	Team	Apps	(Gls)
2006–2007	Defensor	26	(4)
2007–2008	Villarreal	0	(0)
2007–2008	→ Recreativo (loan)	34	(2)
2008–2011	Barcelona	13	(0)
2009–2010	→ Juventus (loan)	15	(1)
2010–2011	→ Sevilla (loan)	25	(1)
2011–2012	Sevilla	14	(1)
2012	→ Juventus (loan)	11	(1)
2012–2016	Juventus	51	(2)
2017	Southampton	1	(0)
2017–2018	Hellas Verona	14	(3)
2018–2019	Lazio	10	(1)
2019	→ Juventus (loan)	9	(0)
2019–2021	Fiorentina	56	(3)
2021–2022	Cagliari	14	(1)
2022	Levante	10	(0)
2022–2024	LA Galaxy	36	(2)
2025	Libertad	2	(0)
2026–	Juventud	12	(0)

International career
2006–2007	Uruguay U20	16	(1)
2007–2022	Uruguay	116	(4)
Medal record
Representing Uruguay
Copa América
Winner	2011 Argentina
- * Club domestic league appearances and goals as of 06:51, 7 September 2026 (UTC)

José Martín Cáceres Silva (Spanish pronunciation: [maɾˈtiŋ ˈkaseɾes]; born 7 April 1987) is a Uruguayan professional footballer who plays for Liga AUF Uruguaya club Juventud. Mainly a centre-back, he can also play on either flank, mostly as a right-back.

After starting out at Defensor Sporting, he was bought by Spanish club Villarreal in 2007. In the following years he competed in Spain and Italy, notably winning six Serie A titles with Juventus and the 2009 Champions League with Barcelona. He later had a brief spell in England with Southampton before returning to Italy in 2017; despite his ability, his career was limited by several injuries.

An Uruguay international since the age of 20, Cáceres represented the country in four World Cups, three editions of the Copa América and the 2013 Confederations Cup, winning the 2011 Copa América.

== Club career ==
=== Early years ===
Born in Montevideo, Cáceres started his career with his local team Defensor, becoming a regular at a young age and competing in one full Primera División season with them. In early February 2007, he signed for Spanish club Villarreal, with the deal being made effective in July.

Upon arriving at Villarreal, Cáceres was immediately sent on loan to fellow La Liga side Recreativo de Huelva, being one of the most used players during the season and often partnering Beto in central defence as the Andalusians managed to retain their division status, finishing in 16th position; on 9 January 2008, he scored against the club that owned his rights in the Copa del Rey (1–0 home win, but 2–1 loss on aggregate), and never appeared officially for them.

=== Barcelona ===
Cáceres joined Barcelona on 4 June 2008, with a reported transfer fee of €16.5 million being paid to Villarreal. A buyout clause of €50 million was included in the deal, which ran until June 2012. During his only season at the Camp Nou, he featured sparsely due to both injury and technical decisions.

Even after his recovery, Cáceres only managed to be fourth-choice stopper behind Rafael Márquez, Gerard Piqué and Carles Puyol. He appeared in three games in the campaign's UEFA Champions League – two starts, 217 minutes – being an unused substitute in the final against Manchester United which completed the treble for the Catalans.

=== Loan to Juventus ===
On 6 August 2009, Barcelona loaned Cáceres to Juventus in Serie A, with the Turin team having an option to make his stay permanent at the end of the season for €11 million, plus €1 million in variables. He made his debut in a pre-season friendly against former team Villarreal the following day, replacing Jonathan Zebina at right-back at half-time.

The league season began well for Cáceres as he made a goal-scoring debut, netting the opener in a 2–0 away win against Lazio. He began as a regular under Ciro Ferrara, but his campaign would be ultimately disrupted by a number of injuries, including one in January 2010 that put him out of action for several months.

=== Sevilla ===
On 30 August 2010, Cáceres returned to Spain and joined Sevilla on a season-long loan, with an option to purchase. He featured regularly for the Gregorio Manzano-led team, especially at right-back following the return of Abdoulay Konko to Genoa in January 2011.

Cáceres was severely injured by Michael Jakobsen in a match against Almería on 1 May 2011, suffering a lacerated kidney following a dangerous challenge. The Dane was given a straight red card, and the South American was initially ruled out for the rest of the campaign, but unexpectedly recovered for the final two games, with his side finishing fifth and qualifying for the UEFA Europa League.

On 31 May 2011, Sevilla agreed a €3 million deal plus €1.5 million in variables with Barcelona for the permanent move of Cáceres to the Ramón Sánchez Pizjuán Stadium. In late January 2012, however, he returned to Juventus on loan.

=== Juventus return ===
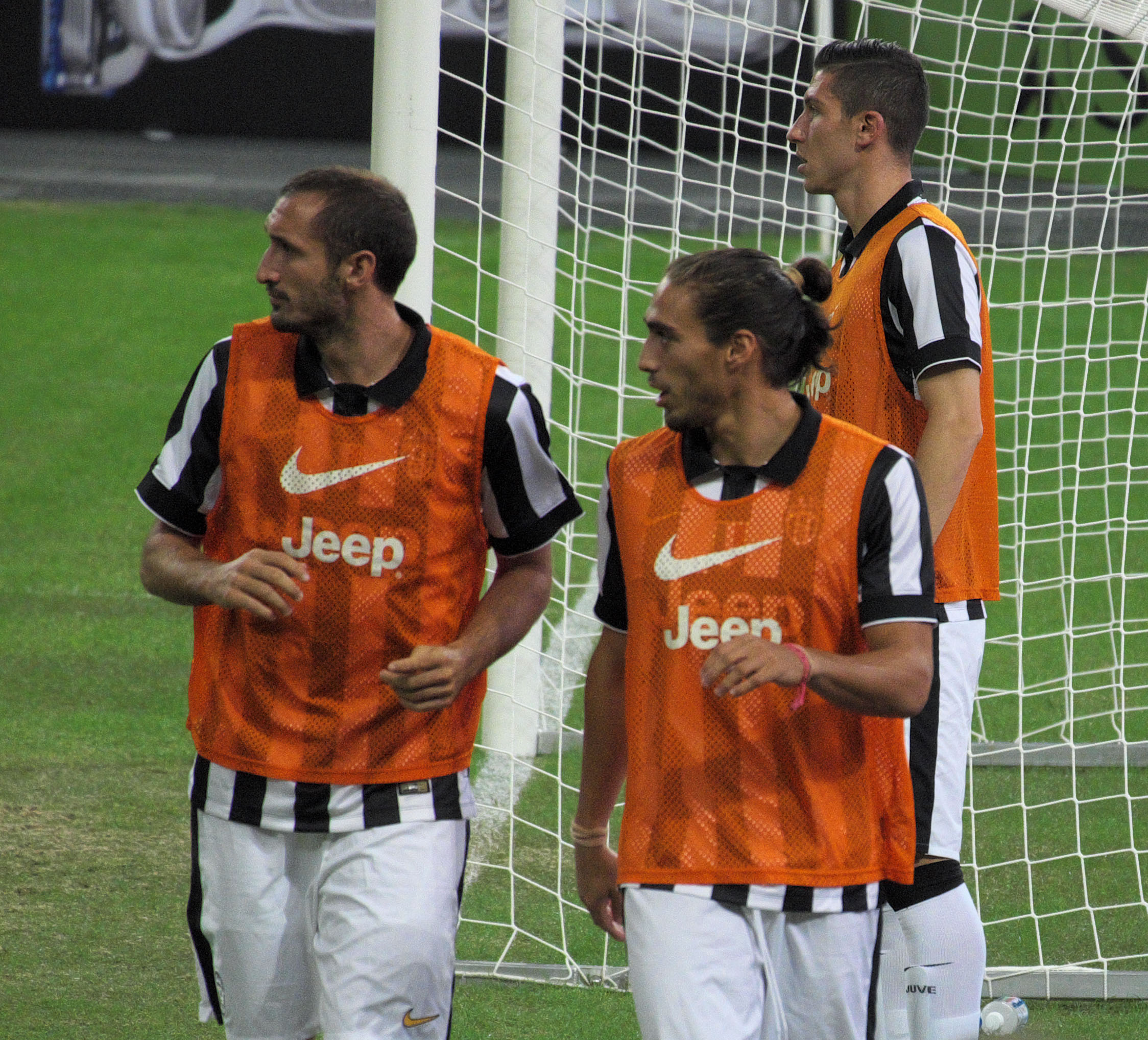
Cáceres (front right) warming up for Juventus in Singapore in August 2014

At Juventus, Cáceres chose to wear the number 4 shirt, which had previously belonged to compatriot Paolo Montero. He made his debut for Juve in his second spell on 8 February 2012, playing the full 90 minutes in a 2–1 away win against AC Milan in the semi-finals of the Coppa Italia and scoring both of his team's goals. On 25 March he netted his first league goal, heading home an Andrea Pirlo corner kick in the 57th minute of a 2–0 home victory over Inter Milan.

On 25 May 2012, Cáceres joined Juventus on a permanent basis, signing a four-year contract. He missed most of the first half of the 2014–15 campaign, after picking up an injury in a 3–2 home win over Roma in October 2014 which sidelined him for three months. He returned to the starting line-up on 11 January 2015, scoring in a 3–1 defeat of Napoli at the Stadio San Paolo. On 8 March, however, he fractured his ankle during a training session, requiring surgery; as a result, he was ruled out indefinitely.

Cáceres returned to the starting line-up on 8 August 2015, in Juventus' 2–0 victory over Lazio in the Supercoppa Italiana. In late September, however, he had his driving license revoked for six months and was suspended by the club after crashing his Ferrari into a bus stop in Turin following a wrong turn. He was alleged to have been over the legal alcohol limit for driving.

Cáceres returned to action on 6 January 2016, starting and playing 84 minutes in a 3–0 home win against Hellas Verona. On 4 February, it was confirmed that he would be sidelined for the rest of the season due to the rupture of his right Achilles tendon during the match the day before against Genoa. In May, Juventus' director of football Giuseppe Marotta announced that the player's contract would not be renewed, and that he would be leaving the club on 30 June.

=== Southampton ===
On 16 February 2017, Cáceres joined Premier League club Southampton as a free agent, signing an initial contract lasting until the end of the season. Ten days later, he was included in a matchday squad for the first time, remaining an unused substitute in the final of the EFL Cup, a 3–2 loss to Manchester United.

After three months at St Mary's Stadium, Cáceres appeared in his only game, starting in a 2–1 away win over Middlesbrough on 13 May. He was released on 25 May.

=== Hellas Verona ===
Cáceres returned to Italy in early August 2017, signing for Hellas Verona on a deal running until 30 June 2018. However, it was reported that Lazio had already expressed an interest in acquiring his services, but were ultimately unable to as their quota of two non-EU signings from abroad had already been filled. He joined Verona instead as a result, although rumours circulated in the media linking him with a possible move to Lazio in January as there were no restrictions impeding the transfer of non-EU players between Italian clubs.

=== Lazio and Juventus ===
On 8 January 2018, Cáceres joined Lazio on a one-year contract with the option for a renewal. He scored his only goal of the campaign on 18 April in a 4–3 away defeat of Fiorentina, featuring sparingly for the fifth-placed team.

On 29 January 2019, Juventus announced the signing of Cáceres on a five-month loan, marking this as his third spell at the club. He made his first appearance since 2016 on 2 February, in a 3–3 home draw against Parma in the domestic league.

Cáceres left Juventus at the end of the season, when his contract with Lazio also expired.

=== Fiorentina ===
On 30 August 2019, Cáceres joined Fiorentina on a one-year deal with the option for a further season. The following 18 May, he declared that he had tested positive for COVID-19 for 60 days.

=== Cagliari ===
Cáceres moved to Cagliari on a one-year contract on 1 September 2021, where he shared teams with national teammates Diego Godín and Nahitan Nández. He scored his only goal for the Sardinians on 17 October, the second in a 3–1 home victory over Sampdoria.

=== Levante ===
Cáceres returned to the Spanish top tier on 30 January 2022, with the free agent agreeing to a one-year deal at Levante with the possibility of a one-year extension. Nine of his appearances were starts, in an eventual relegation; the same happened to his previous side, Cagliari.

=== LA Galaxy ===
On 24 August 2022, Cáceres joined Major League Soccer club LA Galaxy as a free agent until the end of the season. He scored his first goal on 15 May 2023, opening an eventual 2–1 home win against the San Jose Earthquakes.

Cáceres was part of the squad that won the MLS Cup 2024 on 7 December, even though he did not feature in any matches having been sidelined since 8 August with an Achilles tendon injury.

=== Later career ===
On 11 February 2025, aged 37, Cáceres moved to the Paraguayan Primera División on a ten-month contract at Libertad. One year later, he returned to the Uruguayan top tier after a two-decade absence, signing for Juventud de Las Piedras.

== International career ==
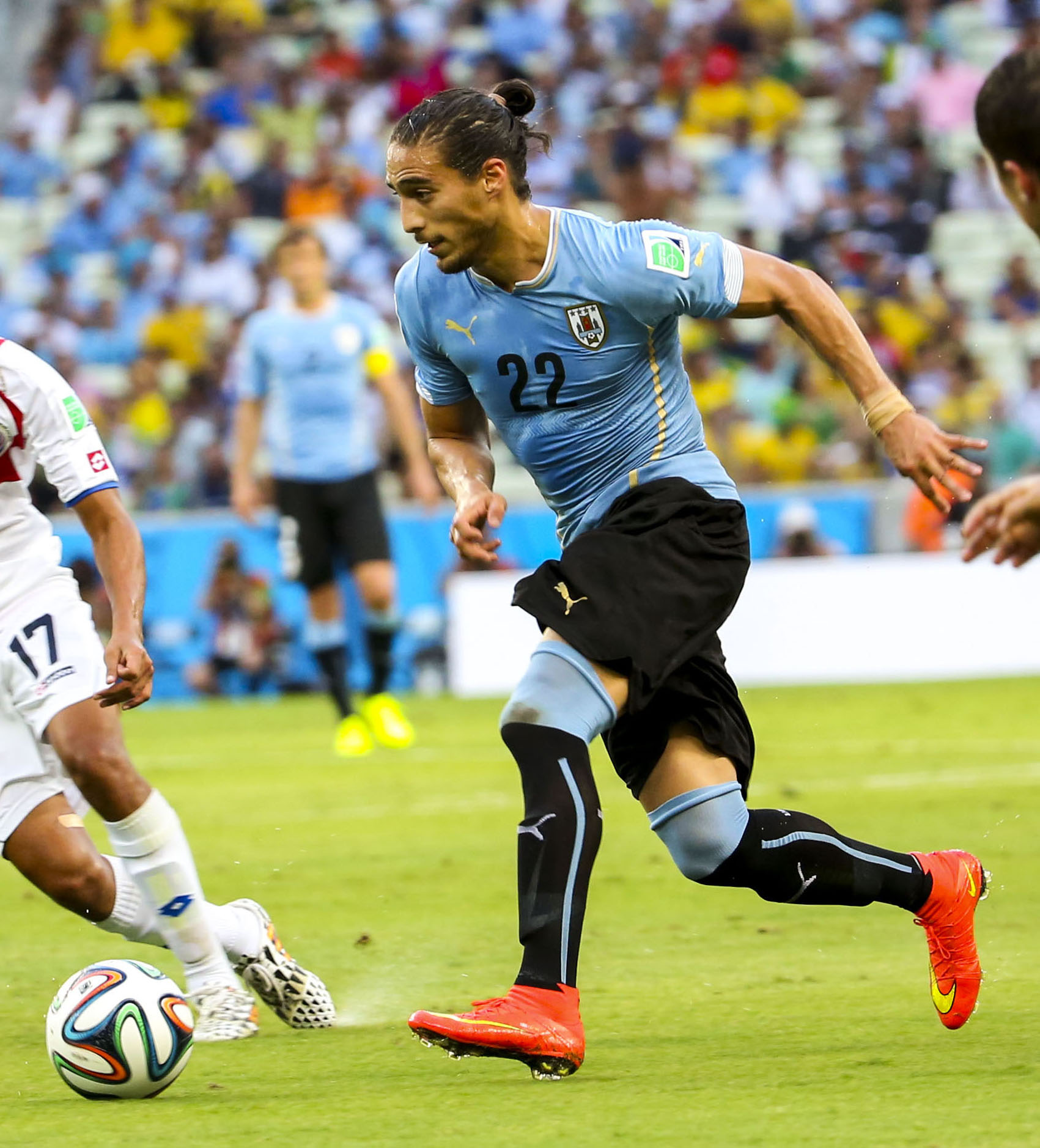
Cáceres in action at the 2014 World Cup

Cáceres played for Uruguay at the 2007 FIFA U-20 World Cup held in Canada, appearing in all the matches in an eventual round-of-16 exit. Previously, he was named the best defender at the 2007 South American U-20 Championship, helping his team to third place.

Cáceres made his debut for the full side on 12 September 2007, in Johannesburg against South Africa. In 2010, he was selected by manager Óscar Tabárez for his list of 23 players for that year's FIFA World Cup, as back-up to Porto's Jorge Fucile at right-back and taking part in the semi-finals against the Netherlands and the third-place match against Germany (both 3–2 losses).

Cáceres scored his first international goal on 23 June 2011, in a 3–0 friendly home win over Estonia. With Fucile not being selected to the 2011 Copa América in Argentina, he played five out of six games during the tournament – as right and left back – with the Charrúas winning their 15th continental tournament. He notably scored the decisive penalty in a penalty shootout victory over the hosts in the quarter-finals.

Cáceres made four appearances for Uruguay in the 2013 FIFA Confederations Cup. In the third-place match against Italy, his penalty was saved by Juventus teammate Gianluigi Buffon as the opposition won the shootout by 3–2 after a 2–2 deadlock following extra time. He was also a member of the squad that took part at the 2014 World Cup, featuring four times in the tournament to help the nation reach the last-16 phase, where they suffered a 2–0 defeat to Colombia at the Maracanã Stadium on 28 June.

Due to an ankle injury suffered in March 2015, Cáceres was excluded from the 2015 Copa América squad. A serious Achilles tendon ailment in February 2016 also prevented his participation in the Copa América Centenario the following summer.

Cáceres was included in Uruguay's final 23-man squad for the 2018 World Cup in Russia. He played all the matches and minutes in a quarter-final exit.

In March 2019, Tabárez named Cáceres in the squad for the 2019 Copa América in Brazil. On 16 June, he provided the assist to Luis Suárez's goal in a 4–0 win over Ecuador in the team's opening group match of the tournament. He appeared four times in total throughout the tournament, including the quarter-final tie against Peru in which his team were eliminated from the competition after losing 5–4 on penalties, following a 0–0 draw after regulation time.

Cáceres earned his 100th cap on 13 October 2020, in a 4–2 loss to Ecuador in the 2022 World Cup qualifiers.

== Style of play ==
Cáceres's primary position is that of a central defender, but he can also operate as a left or right-back, being noted for his pace, strength, tackling and aerial ability. He has also been deployed as a wing-back or winger, on either side of the pitch.

During his time with Juventus, Cáceres' tenacious approach drew comparisons to compatriot Montero, who also played there.

== Career statistics ==
=== Club ===
As of match played 4 August 2024

Appearances and goals by club, season and competition
Club	Season	League			National cup		Continental		Other		Total	
Club	Season	Division	Apps	Goals	Apps	Goals	Apps	Goals	Apps	Goals	Apps	Goals
Defensor	2005–06	Uruguayan Primera División	2	0	0	0	0	0	–		2	0
Defensor	2006–07	Uruguayan Primera División	24	4	0	0	0	0	–		24	4
Defensor	Total		26	4	0	0	0	0	–		26	4
Recreativo (loan)	2007–08	La Liga	34	2	2	1	–		–		36	3
Barcelona	2008–09	La Liga	13	0	7	0	3 (Note: Appearances in UEFA Champions League)	0	–		23	0
Juventus	2009–10	Serie A	15	1	1	0	5	0	–		21	1
Sevilla (loan)	2010–11	La Liga	25	1	5	0	7 (Note: Appearances in UEFA Europa League)	0	–		37	1
Sevilla	2011–12	La Liga	14	1	4	0	0	0	–		18	1
Juventus (loan)	2011–12	Serie A	11	1	3	2	–		–		14	3
Juventus	2012–13	Serie A	18	1	2	0	2	0	0	0	22	1
Juventus	2013–14	Serie A	17	0	1	1	11 (Note: Three appearances in UEFA Champions League, eight appearances in UEFA Europa League)	0	1 (Note: Appearance in Supercoppa Italiana)	0	30	1
Juventus	2014–15	Serie A	10	1	2	0	2	0	0	0	14	1
Juventus	2015–16	Serie A	6	0	2	0	0	0	1	0	9	0
Juventus	Total		62	3	10	3	15	0	2	0	89	6
Southampton	2016–17	Premier League	1	0	0	0	0	0	–		1	0
Hellas Verona	2017–18	Serie A	14	3	1	0	–		–		15	3
Lazio	2017–18	Serie A	6	1	2	0	2	0	0	0	10	1
Lazio	2018–19	Serie A	4	0	0	0	4	0	–		8	0
Lazio	Total		10	1	2	0	6	0	0	0	18	1
Juventus (loan)	2018–19	Serie A	9	0	0	0	0	0	0	0	9	0
Fiorentina	2019–20	Serie A	27	1	3	1	–		–		30	2
Fiorentina	2020–21	Serie A	29	2	2	0	–		–		31	2
Fiorentina	Total		56	3	5	1	0	0	0	0	61	4
Cagliari	2021–22	Serie A	14	1	1	0	–		–		15	1
Levante	2021–22	La Liga	10	0	–		–		–		10	0
LA Galaxy	2022	Major League Soccer	6	0	–		–		2 (Note: Appearances in MLS Cup playoffs)	0	8	0
LA Galaxy	2023	Major League Soccer	15	2	3	0	–		0	0	18	2
LA Galaxy	2024	Major League Soccer	15	0	0	0	–		1 (Note: Appearance in Leagues Cup)	0	16	0
LA Galaxy	Total		36	2	3	0	0	0	3	0	42	2
Career total			339	22	41	5	36	0	5	0	415	27

=== International ===
Appearances and goals by national team and year
National team	Year	Apps	Goals
Uruguay	2007	1	0
Uruguay	2008	9	0
Uruguay	2009	8	0
Uruguay	2010	6	0
Uruguay	2011	14	1
Uruguay	2012	6	0
Uruguay	2013	11	0
Uruguay	2014	8	0
Uruguay	2015	6	2
Uruguay	2016	0	0
Uruguay	2017	6	1
Uruguay	2018	11	0
Uruguay	2019	12	0
Uruguay	2020	4	0
Uruguay	2021	8	0
Uruguay	2022	6	0
Total		116	4

Scores and results list Uruguay's goal tally first, score column indicates score after each Cáceres goal.

List of international goals scored by Martín Cáceres
No.	Date	Venue	Opponent	Score	Result	Competition	Ref.
1	23 June 2011	Estadio Atilio Paiva Olivera, Rivera, Uruguay	Estonia	1–0	3–0	Friendly	
2	8 October 2015	Estadio Hernando Siles, La Paz, Bolivia	Bolivia	1–0	2–0	2018 FIFA World Cup qualification	
3	17 November 2015	Estadio Centenario, Montevideo, Uruguay	Chile	3–0	3–0	2018 FIFA World Cup qualification	
4	10 October 2017	Estadio Centenario, Montevideo, Uruguay	Bolivia	1–1	4–2	2018 FIFA World Cup qualification	

== Honours ==
Barcelona

- La Liga: 2008–09
- Copa del Rey: 2008–09
- UEFA Champions League: 2008–09

Juventus

- Serie A: 2011–12, 2012–13, 2013–14, 2014–15, 2015–16, 2018–19
- Coppa Italia: 2014–15, 2015–16; runner-up: 2011–12
- Supercoppa Italiana: 2012, 2013, 2015
- UEFA Champions League runner-up: 2014–15

Southampton

- EFL Cup runner-up: 2016–17

Uruguay

- Copa América: 2011

Individual

- South American Youth Football Championship Best Defender: 2007
- UEFA La Liga Breakthrough Team: 2007–08
- Don Balón Team of the Season: 2007–08

== See also ==
- List of men's footballers with 100 or more international caps
