= 2021 LA Galaxy season =

American soccer club season

LA Galaxy
2021 season
- Owner: Philip Anschutz (AEG)
- Head coach: Greg Vanney
- Stadium: Dignity Health Sports Park
- MLS: Conference: 8th Overall: 15th
- MLS Cup Playoffs: Did not qualify
- U.S. Open Cup: Canceled
- Top goalscorer: League: Javier Hernández (17); All: Javier Hernández (17)
- Highest home attendance: 23,165 (vs. Seattle Sounders FC – June 19)
- Lowest home attendance: 6,853 (vs. New York Red Bulls – April 25)
- Average home league attendance: 7,080
- Biggest win: 4–1 (vs. Portland)
- Biggest defeat: 0–4 (at FC Dallas)
Home colors	Away colors

The 2021 LA Galaxy season was the club's 26th season of existence, and their 26th in Major League Soccer, the top-tier of the American soccer pyramid. LA Galaxy played its home matches at the stadium Dignity Health Sports Park in the LA suburb of Carson, California. The Galaxy attempted to make the playoffs after failing to qualify in 2020, but were ultimately unsuccessful.

== Management team ==
Position	Name
General manager	(Netherlands) Dennis te Kloese
Head coach	(United States) Greg Vanney
Assistant coach	(United States) Dan Calichman
Head Athletic Trainer	(United States) Cesar Roldan
Equipment manager	(Mexico) Raul Vargas

== Players ==
=== Squad information ===
As of April 30, 2021

No.	Position	Player	Nation
1	GK	ENG	Jonathan Bond
2	DF	USA	Julián Araujo
3	DF	IRL	Derrick Williams
4	DF	FRA	Séga Coulibaly
5	DF	USA	Daniel Steres
6	MF	MAD	Rayan Raveloson
7	MF	ESP	Víctor Vázquez
8	MF	MEX	Jonathan dos Santos (DP)
9	MF	FRA	Kévin Cabral (DP)
11	MF	FRA	Samuel Grandsir
12	GK	USA	Eric Lopez (HG)
14	FW	MEX	Javier Hernández (DP)
16	MF	USA	Sacha Kljestan
17	MF	USA	Sebastian Lletget
18	GK	USA	Justin Vom Steeg
19	DF	USA	Jorge Villafaña
20	DF	USA	Nick DePuy
21	DF	CRC	Giancarlo González
24	DF	USA	Danilo Acosta
25	FW	USA	Cameron Dunbar (HG)
26	MF	MEX	Efraín Álvarez (HG)
27	MF	PAN	Carlos Harvey
28	MF	NED	Kai Koreniuk
29	FW	USA	Ethan Zubak (HG)
33	GK	USA	Jonathan Klinsmann
43	MF	USA	Adam Saldana (HG)
44	DF	USA	Jalen Neal (HG)
48	FW	SLE	Augustine Williams
56	MF	MEX	Jonathan Perez (HG)
70	DF	USA	Marcus Ferkranus
91	DF	JAM	Oniel Fisher

=== Transfers ===
==== Transfers in ====
Pos.	Player	Transferred from	Fee/notes	Date	Source
DF	(United States) Jorge Villafaña	(United States) Portland Timbers	Signed in exchange for the LA Galaxy 2021 1st Round SuperDraft Pick (8th overall).	January 12, 2021	
GK	(England) Jonathan Bond	(England) West Bromwich Albion	Sign.	January 14, 2021	
MF	(United States) Adam Saldana	(United States) LA Galaxy II	Sign.	January 19, 2021	
DF	(United States) Jalen Neal	(United States) LA Galaxy II	Sign.	January 20, 2021	
DF	(United States) Marcus Ferkranus	(United States) LA Galaxy II	Sign.	January 22, 2021	
DF	(Jamaica) Oniel Fisher	(United States) D.C. United	Sign.	February 15, 2021	
MF	(Panama) Carlos Harvey	(Panama) Tauro	Sign.	February 17, 2021	
DF	(Republic of Ireland) Derrick Williams	(England) Blackburn Rovers	Sign.	March 4, 2021	
MF	(France) Samuel Grandsir	(France) Monaco	Signed with TAM.	March 11, 2021	
MF	(Spain) Víctor Vázquez	(Belgium) Eupen	Sign.	March 17, 2021	
FW	(France) Kévin Cabral	(France) Valenciennes	Sign.	April 8, 2021	
DF	(France) Séga Coulibaly	(France) Nancy	Sign.	April 28, 2021	
FW	(Sierra Leone) Augustine Williams	(United States) LA Galaxy II	Sign.	April 30, 2021	
MF	(Madagascar) Rayan Raveloson	(France) Troyes	Sign.	May 20, 2021	

==== Draft picks ====
Draft picks are not automatically signed to the team roster. Only those who are signed to a contract will be listed as transfers in.

Date	Player	Position	College	Pick	Source
January 21, 2021	(United States) Josh Drack	FW	University of Denver	16th	
January 21, 2021	(United States) Preston Judd	FW	University of Denver	35th	

==== Transfers out ====
Pos.	Player	Transferred to	Fee/notes	Date	Source
MF	(United States) Joe Corona	(United States) Austin FC	Selected in the 2020 MLS Expansion Draft.	December 15, 2020	
DF	(Venezuela) Rolf Feltscher	(Germany) Würzburger Kickers	Free transfer.	December 23, 2020	
FW	(Colombia) Yony González	(Portugal) Benfica	Loan return.	December 31, 2020	
MF	(Argentina) Emil Cuello	(United States) San Antonio FC	Option declined.	January 20, 2021	
MF	(United States) Perry Kitchen	(United States) Columbus Crew SC	Free transfer.	January 28, 2021	
DF	(France) Diedie Traore		Released.	March 5, 2021	

== Competitions ==
=== Preseason ===
The first preseason games were announced on March 5, 2021.

March 20	LA Galaxy	2–1	San Diego Loyal SC	Carson, California
	Perez 53'; Judd (pen.)	LA Report; SD Report	Fodrey	Stadium: Dignity Health Sports Park
Note: 120-minute scrimmage.

March 27	LA Galaxy	1–0	New England Revolution	Carson, California
	Perez	Report		Stadium: Dignity Health Sports Park

March 31	LA Galaxy	1–4	New England Revolution	Carson, California
	Barajas 28'	Report	Buksa 6'; Bunbury 23'; McNamara 64'; Bou 67'	Stadium: Dignity Health Sports Park

April 3	LA Galaxy	0–1	Sporting Kansas City	Tucson, Arizona
		Report	Busio	Stadium: Kino Sports Complex

April 7	LA Galaxy	2–2	Colorado Rapids	Tucson, Arizona
	Lletget; Harvey	Report	Barrios; Bassett	Stadium: Kino Sports Complex

April 10	LA Galaxy	1–0	Real Salt Lake	Tucson, Arizona
	Vázquez	Report		Stadium: Kino Sports Complex

=== Major League Soccer ===
==== Standings ====
===== Overall =====
Pos	Team	Pld	W	L	T	GF	GA	GD	Pts
13	Real Salt Lake	34	14	14	6	55	54	+1	48
14	New York Red Bulls	34	13	12	9	39	33	+6	48
15	LA Galaxy	34	13	12	9	50	54	−4	48
16	D.C. United	34	14	15	5	56	54	+2	47
17	Columbus Crew	34	13	13	8	46	45	+1	47

Source: MLS
Rules for classification: 1) points; 2) total wins; 3) total goal differential; 4) total goals scored; 5) fewer disciplinary points; 6) away goal differential; 7) away goals scored; 8) home goals differential; 9) home goals scored; 10) coin toss (2 clubs tied) or drawing of lots (≥3 clubs tied)

===== Western Conference =====
Pos	Team	Pld	W	L	T	GF	GA	GD	Pts	Qualification
6	Vancouver Whitecaps FC (Note: Canadian clubs cannot qualify for the 2022 CONCACAF Champions League through the MLS regular season or playoffs.)	34	12	9	13	45	45	0	49	Qualification for the Playoffs first round
7	Real Salt Lake	34	14	14	6	55	54	+1	48	Qualification for the Playoffs first round
8	LA Galaxy	34	13	12	9	50	54	−4	48	
9	Los Angeles FC	34	12	13	9	53	51	+2	45	
10	San Jose Earthquakes	34	10	13	11	46	54	−8	41	

Source: MLS
Rules for classification: 1) points; 2) total wins; 3) total goal differential; 4) total goals scored; 5) fewer disciplinary points; 6) away goal differential; 7) away goals scored; 8) home goals differential; 9) home goals scored; 10) coin toss (2 clubs tied) or drawing of lots (≥3 clubs tied)

==== Results summary ====
Overall								Home						Away					
Pld	W	D	L	GF	GA	GD	Pts	W	D	L	GF	GA	GD	W	D	L	GF	GA	GD
34	13	9	12	50	54	−4	48	8	5	4	29	22	+7	5	4	8	21	32	−11

Source: Match reports

Round	1	2	3	4	5	6	7	8	9	10	11	12	13	14	15	16	17	18	19	20	21	22	23	24	25	26	27	28	29	30	31	32	33	34
Stadium	A	H	A	H	H	A	H	H	A	A	H	H	A	A	A	H	H	H	A	H	H	A	A	H	A	A	A	H	H	A	H	A	A	H
Result	W	W	L	W	W	L	W	L	W	W	L	W	L	D	L	W	W	D	W	L	L	D	D	D	L	L	L	D	W	W	D	L	D	D

Updated to match(es) played on September 15th, 2021. Source: Match reports
A = Away; H = Home; W = Win; D = Draw; L = Loss; P = Postponed

==== Regular season ====
Win Draw Loss Postponed

All times in Pacific Time Zone.

April 18 1	Inter Miami CF	2–3	LA Galaxy	Fort Lauderdale, Florida
12:00	González Pírez (yellow card) 1'; Robinson 45+2'; Gregore (yellow card) 58'; G. Higuaín 68' (pen.)	Report	Hernández 62', 73'; Kljestan 81'	Stadium: DRV PNK Stadium; Attendance: 7,939; Referee: Chris Penso

April 25 2	LA Galaxy	3–2	New York Red Bulls	Carson, California
14:30	Hernández 9', 41', 60'; Grandsir (yellow card) 63'; Álvarez (yellow card) 90+1'	Report	Gutman 26'; Cásseres 63'; Clark (yellow card) 87'; Yearwood (yellow card) 90+5'	Stadium: Dignity Health Sports Park; Attendance: 6,853; Referee: Victor Rivas

May 2 3	Seattle Sounders FC	3–0	LA Galaxy	Seattle, Washington
18:00	Ruidíaz 20', 90+3'; Smith 23'	Report		Stadium: Lumen Field; Attendance: 7,148; Referee: Jair Marrufo

May 8 4	LA Galaxy	2–1	Los Angeles FC	Carson, California
17:00	Hernández 11', (yellow card) 44'; Villafaña (yellow card) 20'; Saldana (yellow card) 42'; Dos Santos 79', (yellow card) 80'; Harvey (yellow card) 83'; Araujo (yellow card) 90+2'	Report	Rossi 62'; Blackmon (yellow card) 82'	Stadium: Dignity Health Sports Park; Attendance: 7,193; Referee: Allen Chapman

May 15 5	LA Galaxy	2–0	Austin FC	Carson, California
12:30	Lletget 35'; Hernández 77'	Report		Stadium: Dignity Health Sports Park; Attendance: 7,193; Referee: Kevin Stott

May 22 6	Portland Timbers	3–0	LA Galaxy	Portland, Oregon
12:30	Mora 47', 60'; Valeri 69' (pen.)	Report	Williams (red card) 44'	Stadium: Providence Park; Referee: Alan Kelly

May 29 7	LA Galaxy	1–0	San Jose Earthquakes	Carson, California
4:00	Dos Santos (yellow card) 43'; Araujo (yellow card) 49'; Beason 70' (o.g.); Kljestan (yellow card) 84'	Report	Judson (yellow card) 29'	Stadium: Dignity Health Sports Park; Attendance: 7,193; Referee: Joseph Dickerson

June 19 8	LA Galaxy	1–2	Seattle Sounders FC	Carson, California
6:00	Kljestan 21' (pen.)	Report	Andrade 41'; Ruidíaz 49'	Stadium: Dignity Health Sports Park; Attendance: 23,165; Referee: Drew Fischer

June 23 9	Vancouver Whitecaps FC	1–2	LA Galaxy	Sandy, Utah
7:30	Godoy (yellow card) 23'; Bikel 90+2'	Report	Hernández 47'; DePuy (yellow card) 78'; Álvarez 90+3'	Stadium: Rio Tinto Stadium; Referee: Tori Penso
Note: Vancouver Whitecaps FC played home matches at Rio Tinto Stadium since the start of the 2021 season because of border restrictions between the United States and Canada due to the COVID-19 pandemic. Vancouver play as the home team for this match.

June 26 10	San Jose Earthquakes	1–3	LA Galaxy	San Jose, California
7:00	Judson (yellow card) 6'; Remedi (yellow card) 66'; Cowell 82'; López (yellow card) 90'	Report	Hernández 11', 50'; Bond (yellow card) 59'; Jungwirth 70' (o.g.)	Stadium: PayPal Park; Attendance: 18,000; Referee: Armando Villarreal

July 4 11	LA Galaxy	0–2	Sporting Kansas City	Carson, California
7:30	Villafaña (yellow card) 45+3'	Report	Sallói (yellow card) 32'; Russell 81'; Shelton 90+5'	Stadium: Dignity Health Sports Park; Attendance: 23,556; Referee: Alex Chilowicz

July 7 12	LA Galaxy	3–1	FC Dallas	Carson, California
7:30	Raveloson 17'; Cabral 27'; Zubak 51'; DePuy (yellow card) 66'	Recap	Twumasi (yellow card) 54'; Cerrillo (yellow card) 57'; Jara 71'; Obrian (yellow card) 83'	Stadium: Dignity Health Sports Park; Attendance: 16,453; Referee: Alan Kelly

July 17 13	Vancouver Whitecaps FC	2–1	LA Galaxy	Sandy, Utah
7:00	Caicedo 48'; Baldisimo (yellow card) 69'; Dájome 77'	Recap	Raveloson 5'; Williams (yellow card) 62'	Stadium: Rio Tinto Stadium; Referee: Ismir Pekmic
Note: Vancouver Whitecaps FC played home matches at Rio Tinto Stadium since the start of the 2021 season because of border restrictions between the United States and Canada due to the COVID-19 pandemic. Vancouver played as the home team for this match.

July 21 14	Real Salt Lake	2–2	LA Galaxy	Sandy, Utah
7:00	Rusnák 9'; Chang 26'	Recap	Vázquez 33'; Raveloson (yellow card) 71', (goal) 77'; Kljestan (yellow card) 90+2'	Stadium: Rio Tinto Stadium; Attendance: 16,169; Referee: Kevin Stott

July 24 15	FC Dallas	4–0	LA Galaxy	Frisco, Texas
5:30	Ricaurte (yellow card) 18'; Pepi 27', 44', 50'; Maurer (yellow card) 78'; Obrian 88'	Recap	Saldana (yellow card) 22'; Araujo (yellow card) 59'; Acosta (yellow card) 83'	Stadium: Toyota Stadium; Attendance: 14,812; Referee: Silviu Petrescu

July 30 16	LA Galaxy	4–1	Portland Timbers	Carson, California
7:00	Raveloson 27'; Vázquez 34'; Kljestan 53' (pen.); Grandsir 56'; Villafaña (yellow card) 62'	Recap	Ebobisse 29'; Van Rankin (yellow card) 74'; D. Chará (yellow card) 83'; Mabiala (yellow card) 90+6'	Stadium: Dignity Health Sports Park; Attendance: 15,644; Referee: Robert Sibiga

August 4 17	LA Galaxy	1–0	Real Salt Lake	Carson, California
7:30	Álvarez 53'	Recap	Besler (yellow card) 35'; Toia (yellow card) 70'; Meram (yellow card) 85'	Stadium: Dignity Health Sports Park; Attendance: 15,544; Referee: Nima Saghafi

August 8 18	LA Galaxy	1–1	Vancouver Whitecaps FC	Carson, California
5:00	Araujo (yellow card) 5'; Cabral 32'	Recap	Vesslinović 50', (yellow card) 81'	Stadium: Dignity Health Sports Park; Attendance: 16,234; Referee: Baldomero Toledo

August 14 19	Minnesota United FC	0–1	LA Galaxy	Saint Paul, Minnesota
3:00	Gasper (yellow card) 8'	Recap	Joveljić (yellow card) 25'; Cabral 43', (yellow card) 64'; Vázquez (yellow card) 90'	Stadium: Allianz Field; Attendance: 19,625; Referee: Joseph Dickerson

August 17 20	LA Galaxy	1–2	Colorado Rapids	Carson, California
7:30	Raveloson 34'; Grandsir (yellow card) 62'	Recap	Lewis 13' (pen.); Warner (yellow card) 29'; Wilson (yellow card) 49'; Price (yellow card) 69'; Shinyashiki 73',	Stadium: Dignity Health Sports Park; Attendance: 15,101; Referee: Silviu Petrescu

August 20 21	LA Galaxy	1–2	San Jose Earthquakes	Carson, California
7:00	Cabral (yellow card) 23'; Vázquez 65'; Dos Santos (yellow card) 69'	Recap	Abecasis (yellow card) 11'; Remedi (yellow card) 41'; Ebobisse 52'; Hämäläinen 71' (o.g.); Marchinkowski (yellow card) 86'	Stadium: Dignity Health Sports Park; Attendance: 17,568; Referee: Armando Villarreal

August 28 22	Los Angeles FC	3–3	LA Galaxy	Los Angeles, California
5:00	Cifuentes (yellow card) 14'; Arango 44' (pen.); Rodríguez 58', 66'	Recap	Joveljić 20', 64', (yellow card) 64'; Dos Santos (yellow card) 35'; Coulibaly (yellow card) 76'; Cabral 86', (yellow card) 87'	Stadium: Banc of California Stadium; Attendance: 22,032; Referee: Allen Chapman

September 11th 23	Colorado Rapids	1–1	LA Galaxy	Commerce City, Colorado
12:30	Galván (yellow card) 45'; Barrios 66', (yellow card) 79'; Warner (yellow card) 87'	Recap	Williams (yellow card) 36'; Grandsir 80'; Villafaña (yellow card) 89'	Stadium: Dick's Sporting Goods Park; Attendance: 11,736; Referee: Rosendo Mendoza

September 15th 24	LA Galaxy	1–1	Houston Dynamo FC	Carson, California
7:30	Hernández 61'; Dos Santos (yellow card) 69'	Recap	Picault 13'; Vera (yellow card) 51'; Cerén (yellow card) 65'; Valentin (yellow card) 79'; Quintero (yellow card) 86'; García (yellow card) 90+4'	Stadium: Dignity Health Sports Park; Attendance: 15,341; Referee: Kevin Stott

September 18th 25	Minnesota United FC	3–0	LA Galaxy	Saint Paul, Minnesota
5:00	Reynoso 4', 20'; Finlay 66'; Hayes (yellow card) 82'	Recap	Araujo (yellow card) 50'	Stadium: Allianz Field; Attendance: 19,400; Referee: Jair Marrufo

September 26th 26	Austin FC	2–0	LA Galaxy	Austin, Texas
6:30	Domínguez (yellow card) 48'; Djitté 64'; Gaines II 79'; Driussi (yellow card) 84'	Recap		Stadium: Q2 Stadium; Attendance: 20,738; Referee: Guido Gonzales Jr.

September 29th 27	Real Salt Lake	2–1	LA Galaxy	Sandy, Utah
6:30	Kreilach 45'; Julio 90+5'	Recap	DePuy (yellow card) 46'; Hernández 76'	Stadium: Rio Tinto Stadium; Attendance: 18,121; Referee: Tori Penso

October 3rd 28	LA Galaxy	1–1	Los Angeles FC	Carson, California
5:00	Araujo (yellow card) 10'; Grandsir (yellow card) 18', (goal) 19'; DePuy (yellow card) 30'	Recap	Fall 11'; Edwards (yellow card) 22'; Crisotomo (yellow card) 44'	Stadium: Dignity Health Sports Park; Attendance: 25,174; Referee: Armando Villarreal

October 16th 29	LA Galaxy	2–1	Portland Timbers	Carson, California
7:30	Hernández (yellow card) 38', (goal) 62'; Kljestan (yellow card) 87', (goal) 90+2' (pen.); Joveljić (yellow card) 90+5'	Recap	Bonilla (yellow card) 44'; D. Chará (yellow card) 65'; Blanco 72'	Stadium: Dignity Health Sports Park; Attendance: 15,322; Referee: Victor Rivas

October 20th 30	Houston Dynamo FC	0–3	LA Galaxy	Houston, Texas
5:30	Figueroa (yellow card) 37'	Recap	Hernández (yellow card) 9'; Araujo (yellow card) 11'; Kljestan 39' (pen.); Valentin 45+1' (o.g.); Cabral 47'; DePuy (yellow card) 84'	Stadium: PNC Stadium; Attendance: 13,798; Referee: Rosendo Mendoza

October 23rd 31	LA Galaxy	2–2	FC Dallas	Carson, California
7:00	Raveloson (yellow card) 4'; Hernández 65' (pen.), (yellow card) 86'; Lletget 83'; Depuy (yellow card) 85'	Recap	Ferreira 30'; Jara 41'; Obrian (yellow card) 66'; Pomykal (yellow card) 70'; Maurer (yellow card) 78'; Twumasi (yellow card) 89'; Bressan (yellow card) 90+5'	Stadium: Dignity Health Sports Park; Attendance: 15,136; Referee: Baldomero Toledo

October 27th 32	Sporting Kansas City	2–0	LA Galaxy	Kansas City, Kansas
5:30	Russell 40', 82'; Isimat-Mirin (yellow card) 90+2'	Recap		Stadium: Children's Mercy Park; Attendance: 18,711; Referee: Alan Kelly

November 1st 33	Seattle Sounders FC	1–1	LA Galaxy	Seattle, Washington
7:00	Ruidíaz 51' (pen.); Rowe (yellow card) 66'	Recap	Hernández 19'; Bond (yellow card) 81'; Grandsir (yellow card) 90+1'; Steres (yellow card) 90+4'	Stadium: Lumen Field; Attendance: 32,781; Referee: Joseph Dickerson

November 7th 34	LA Galaxy	3–3	Minnesota United FC	Carson, California
3:00	Araujo (yellow card) 41'; Lletget 45+1'; Hernández 51', 75'	Recap	Dibassy (yellow card) 2'; Hunou 22'; Lod 34'; Araujo 62' (o.g.); Reynoso (yellow card) 73'	Stadium: Dignity Health Sports Park; Attendance: 23,803; Referee: Kevin Stott

== Awards ==
=== Hat-tricks ===
Player	For	Against	Score	Date
(Mexico) Javier Hernández	LA Galaxy	New York Red Bulls	3–2 (H)	April 25

=== Player of the Month ===
Month	Player	Club	Stats	Ref
April & May	(Mexico) Javier Hernández	LA Galaxy	7 GP, 7 G, 1 A	

=== Player / Team of the Week ===
- **Bold** denotes League Player of the Week.

Team of the Week
Week	Goalkeeper	Defenders	Midfielders	Forwards	Bench	Coach
**1**	(Poland) Tytoń (CIN)	(Canada) Brault-Guillard (MTL) (United States) Robinson (ATL) (Honduras) García (HOU) (Canada) Gutiérrez (VAN)	(Costa Rica) Leal (NSH) (United States) Canouse (DCU) (United States) Rodríguez (HOU)	(Slovenia) Berić (CHI) (Mexico) **Hernández** (LA) (Peru) Ruidíaz (SEA)	(United States) Maurer (DAL) (United States) Hines-Ike (DCU) (United States) Mihailovic (MTL) (United States) Atencio (SEA) (Argentina) Acosta (CIN) (United States) Baird (LAFC) (Hungary) Sallói (SKC)	(France) Wilfried Nancy (MTL)
**2**	(United States) Johnson (NYC)	(Canada) Braut-Guillard (MTL) (Argentina) Figal (MIA) (Australia) Smith (SEA)	(Paraguay) Medina (NYC) (Argentina) Barco (ATL) (Argentina) F. Higuaín (MIA) (Ecuador) Julio (RSL)	(United States) Cowell (SJ) (Mexico) **Hernández** (LA) (Paraguay) Domínguez (ATX)	(United States) Ochoa (RSL) (Iceland) Þórarinsson (NYC) (Colombia) Atuesta (LAFC) (United States) Polster (NE) (Colombia) Asprilla (POR) (United States) Busio (SKC) (Portugal) Nani (ORL)	(United States) Josh Wolff (ATX)
**4**	(Canada) Crépeau (VAN)	(Norway) Glesnes (PHI) (United States) Zimmerman (NSH) (Scotland) Wilson (COL)	(United States) Muyl (NSH) (Argentina) Zelarayán (CLB) (United States) Bassett (COL) (Colombia) Dájome (VAN)	(Scotland) Russell (SKC) (Mexico) Hernández (LA) (United States) **Wondolowski** (SJ)	(United States) Stuver (ATX) (Luxembourg) Chanot (NYC) (United States) Clark (RBNY) (Mexico) dos Santos (LA) (Scotland) Morgan (MIA) (Portugal) Nani (ORL) (Peru) Ruidíaz (SEA)	(United States) Greg Vanney (LA)
**10**	(Croatia) Marić (HOU)	(United States) Araujo (LA) (Slovenia) Struna (MTL) (Iceland) Þórarinsson (NYC)	(Portugal) Nani (ORL) (Argentina) Acosta (CIN) (United States) Busio (SKC) (Spain) Medrán (CHI) (Hungary) Sallói (SKC)	(Mexico) **Hernández** (LA) (United States) Pepi (DAL)	(United States) Stuver (ATX) (Spain) Fontàs (SKC) (Brazil) Paulo (SEA) (Slovakia) Rusnák (RSL) (Colombia) Dájome (VAN) (Brazil) Andrade (NYC) (France) Hunou (MIN)	(United States) Luchi Gonzalez (DAL)

== Statistics ==
=== Appearances and goals ===
No.	Pos	Nat	Player	Total		MLS		U.S. Open Cup	
No.	Pos	Nat	Player	Apps	Goals	Apps	Goals	Apps	Goals

== See also ==
- 2021 in American soccer
- 2021 LA Galaxy II season
