= 2021 U.S. Open Cup qualification =

2021 Lamar Hunt U.S. Open Cup qualification
- Dates: July 18, 2020 – May 2, 2021

The 2021 Lamar Hunt U.S. Open Cup tournament proper was to feature teams from all five tiers of the men's American soccer pyramid.

Qualification for the 2021 tournament was drastically altered due to the ongoing COVID-19 pandemic. The tournament itself was downsized to 16 teams, before ultimately being canceled for the second consecutive season due to the pandemic.

== Major League Soccer ==
The top eight American-based teams based in the regular season standings after three weeks of the season, taken on a points-per-game (PPG) basis, were set to qualify for the tournament before its cancellation. Qualification began on April 16, 2021, and concluded on May 2, 2021.

Pos	Team	Pld	W	D	L	GF	GA	GD	Pts	PPG	Qualification
1	Real Salt Lake	2	2	0	0	5	2	+3	6	3.00	2021 U.S. Open Cup
2	Seattle Sounders FC	3	2	1	0	8	1	+7	7	2.33	2021 U.S. Open Cup
3	New England Revolution	3	2	1	0	5	3	+2	7	2.33	2021 U.S. Open Cup
4	New York City FC	3	2	0	1	8	2	+6	6	2.00	2021 U.S. Open Cup
5	San Jose Earthquakes	3	2	0	1	8	4	+4	6	2.00	2021 U.S. Open Cup
6	Austin FC	3	2	0	1	4	3	+1	6	2.00	2021 U.S. Open Cup
7	LA Galaxy	3	2	0	1	6	7	−1	6	2.00	2021 U.S. Open Cup
8	Orlando City SC	3	1	2	0	4	1	+3	5	1.67	2021 U.S. Open Cup
9	Los Angeles FC	3	1	2	0	4	2	+2	5	1.67	
10	FC Dallas	3	1	1	1	5	4	+1	4	1.33	
11	Atlanta United FC	3	1	1	1	4	3	+1	4	1.33	
12	Inter Miami CF	3	1	1	1	4	4	0	4	1.33	
13	Houston Dynamo FC	3	1	1	1	4	4	0	4	1.33	
14	Sporting Kansas City	3	1	1	1	4	5	−1	4	1.33	
15	Colorado Rapids	3	1	1	1	2	3	−1	4	1.33	
16	New York Red Bulls	3	1	0	2	5	5	0	3	1.00	
17	Nashville SC	3	0	3	0	4	4	0	3	1.00	
18	Columbus Crew SC	2	0	2	0	0	0	0	2	1.00	
19	Portland Timbers	3	1	0	2	3	6	−3	3	1.00	
20	D.C. United	3	1	0	2	3	6	−3	3	1.00	
21	Philadelphia Union	3	0	1	2	1	4	−3	1	0.33	
22	Chicago Fire FC	3	0	1	2	3	7	−4	1	0.33	
23	FC Cincinnati	3	0	1	2	2	10	−8	1	0.33	
24	Minnesota United FC	3	0	0	3	1	7	−6	0	0.00	

Source: MLS
Rules for classification: 1) points per game; 2) goal differential per game; 3) goals scored per game; 4) disciplinary points per game; 5) away goal differential per away game; 6) away goals scored per away game; 7) home goal differential per home game; 8) home goals scored per home game; 9) coin toss or drawing of lots

== USL Championship ==
The four semifinalists from the USL Championship playoffs qualified. Qualification retroactively began on October 10, 2020, and ended on October 17, 2020.

=== Groups A and B ===
Qualification semi-finals
A1	(Nevada) Reno 1868	4
B2	(California) LA Galaxy II	1
B1	(Arizona) Phoenix Rising (a.e.t.)	1
A2	(California) Sacramento Republic	0

Qualification finals
A1	(Nevada) Reno 1868	2 (4)
B1	(Arizona) Phoenix Rising (p)	2 (5)

Phoenix Rising qualify

=== Groups C and D ===
Qualification semi-finals
C1	(Texas) El Paso Locomotive (p)	2 (4)
D2	(Oklahoma) FC Tulsa	2 (2)
D1	(Texas) San Antonio FC	0
C2	New Mexico United (a.e.t.)	1

Qualification finals
C1	(Texas) El Paso Locomotive (p)	1 (5)
C2	New Mexico United	1 (3)

El Paso Locomotive qualify

=== Groups E and F ===
Qualification semi-finals
E1	(Kentucky) Louisville City	2
F2	(Pennsylvania) Pittsburgh Riverhounds	0
F1	(Connecticut) Hartford Athletic	0
E2	(Missouri) Saint Louis FC	1

Qualification finals
E1	(Kentucky) Louisville City	2
E2	(Missouri) Saint Louis FC	0

Louisville City qualify

=== Groups G and H ===
Qualification semi-finals
G1	(North Carolina) Charlotte Independence	1
H2	(South Carolina) Charleston Battery (a.e.t.)	2
H1	(Florida) Tampa Bay Rowdies	4
G2	(Alabama) Birmingham Legion	2

Qualification finals
H2	(South Carolina) Charleston Battery	0
H1	(Florida) Tampa Bay Rowdies	1

Tampa Bay Rowdies qualify

=== Table ===
Pos	Team	Pld	W	D	L	GF	GA	GD	Pts	Qualification
1	Tampa Bay Rowdies	4	3	1	0	7	3	+4	10	Finalists; 2021 U.S. Open Cup
2	Phoenix Rising	4	1	3	0	4	3	+1	6	Finalists; 2021 U.S. Open Cup
3	Louisville City	3	2	0	1	5	2	+3	6	Semi-finalists; 2021 U.S. Open Cup
4	El Paso Locomotive	3	0	3	0	4	4	0	3	Semi-finalists; 2021 U.S. Open Cup
5	Reno 1868	2	1	1	0	6	3	+3	4	Quarter-finalists
6	New Mexico United	2	1	1	0	2	1	+1	4	Quarter-finalists
7	Charleston Battery	2	1	0	1	2	2	0	3	Quarter-finalists
8	Saint Louis FC	2	0	1	1	2	4	−2	1	Quarter-finalists
9	FC Tulsa	1	0	1	0	2	2	0	1	Round of 16
10	Charlotte Independence	1	0	0	1	1	2	−1	0	Round of 16
11	Sacramento Republic	1	0	0	1	0	1	−1	0	Round of 16
12	Hartford Athletic	1	0	0	1	0	1	−1	0	Round of 16
13	San Antonio FC	1	0	0	1	0	1	−1	0	Round of 16
14	Birmingham Legion	1	0	0	1	2	4	−2	0	Round of 16
15	Pittsburgh Riverhounds	1	0	0	1	0	2	−2	0	Round of 16
16	LA Galaxy II (Note: Professional teams that are owned by teams playing in a higher division are ineligible for the U.S. Open Cup.)	1	0	0	1	1	4	−3	0	Round of 16

Source: USL Championship
Rules for classification: 1) Points; 2) Goal difference; 3) Goals scored; 4) Away goals scored; 5) Wins; 6) Away wins; 7) Disciplinary points; 8) Drawing of lots (Regulations Article 12.11).

== Division III ==
=== NISA ===
The NISA Fall Champion, Detroit City FC, retroactively qualified on October 2, 2020.

==== Bracket ====
Semifinals; September 30, 2020
**A1**	**Oakland Roots SC**	**3**
B2	Chattanooga FC	2
B1	Los Angeles Force	0
**A2**	**Detroit City FC**	**1**

Finals; October 2, 2020
A1	Oakland Roots SC	1
**A2**	**Detroit City FC**	**2**

Bold = winner
* = after extra time, ( ) = penalty shootout score
Source: nisaofficial.com

==== Matches ====
===== Semifinals =====
September 30, 2020	**Oakland Roots (California)**	**3–2**	**(Tennessee) Chattanooga FC**	Hamtramck, Michigan
5:00pm (EDT)	Rodriguez 6'; Heredia 19'; Pearson (yellow card) 31'; Fondy 48'; Irwin (yellow card) 85'; McInerney (yellow card) 90+4'	NISA Report; FotMob Report; Broadcast	McGrath 46'; Marcano 77'; Russell (yellow card) 90+4'	Stadium: Keyworth Stadium; Attendance: 0 Referee: Samuel Pizzimenti
Note: Game was played behind closed doors due to the COVID-19 pandemic

September 30, 2020	**Los Angeles Force (California)**	**0–1**	**(Michigan) Detroit City**	Hamtramck, Michigan
8:00pm (EDT)		NISA Report; FotMob Report; Broadcast	Todd (yellow card) 22', (goal) 29'	Stadium: Keyworth Stadium; Attendance: 0 Referee: Carter Brochu
Note: Game was played behind closed doors due to the COVID-19 pandemic

===== Final =====
October 2, 2020	**Oakland Roots (California)**	**1–2**	**(Michigan) Detroit City**	Hamtramck, Michigan
6:00pm (EDT)	Rodriguez 26'; Harish (yellow card) 54'; Navarro (yellow card) 77'; Wier (yellow card) 80'; Irwin (yellow card) 90'	NISA Report; FotMob Report; Broadcast	Saydee (yellow card) 16'; Lawson 65'; Peterson 85'	Stadium: Keyworth Stadium; Attendance: 0 Referee: Nicole Green
Note: Game was played behind closed doors due to the COVID-19 pandemic

=== USL League One ===
The 2020 USL League One champion, Greenville Triumph SC qualified.

Pos	Team	Pld	W	L	D	GF	GA	GD	Pts	PPG	Qualification
**1**	Greenville Triumph SC	**16**	**11**	**3**	**2**	**24**	**11**	**+13**	35	2.19	**Final, 2021 U.S. Open Cup**
2	Union Omaha	16	8	3	5	20	15	+5	29	1.81	Final
3	North Texas SC (Note: Professional teams that are owned by teams playing in a higher division are ineligible for the U.S. Open Cup.)	16	7	3	6	27	19	+8	27	1.69	
4	Richmond Kickers	16	8	6	2	22	22	0	26	1.63	
5	Chattanooga Red Wolves SC	15	6	5	4	21	17	+4	22	1.47	
6	FC Tucson	16	6	6	4	21	19	+2	22	1.38	
7	Forward Madison FC	16	5	5	6	20	14	+6	21	1.31	
8	Tormenta FC	16	5	7	4	19	22	−3	19	1.19	
9	New England Revolution II	16	5	8	3	19	26	−7	18	1.13	
10	Fort Lauderdale CF	16	4	9	3	19	28	−9	15	0.94	
11	Orlando City B	15	1	11	3	10	29	−19	6	0.40	

Source: 2020 USL League One standings
Rules for classification: 1) points; 2) total wins; 3) total goal differential; 4) total goals scored; 5) points earned against top four Conference finishers; 6) disciplinary points; 7) coin toss or drawing of lots

==== Final ====
The game was canceled the day before because several Union Omaha players tested positive for COVID-19. Greenville was awarded the title based on points per game average (2.188 to 1.825), and reached the Open Cup.

October 30, 2020
8:00pm (EDT)

Greenville Triumph (South Carolina)	3–0 (walkover)	(Nebraska) Union Omaha

Legacy Early College Field, Greenville, South Carolina

== Open Division (IV and V) ==
Two slots will be selected from the Open Divisions:

- One Open Division Local Qualifier drawn randomly from among 12 eligible
- One National Premier Soccer League team drawn randomly from among 13 eligible
- One USL League Two team drawn randomly from among 10 eligible
- 2019 U.S. Adult Soccer Association National Amateur Cup champion Newtown Pride FC (Conn.)

The draw awarded the slots to Newtown Pride FC (NAC) and FC Golden State Force (USL2).
