= 2024 North Texas SC season =

North Texas SC
2024 season
- Owner: FC Dallas (Clark and Dan Hunt)
- Chairman: Matt Denny
- Head coach: Michel Garbini
- Stadium: Choctaw Stadium
- MLSNP: Frontier Division: 1st Western Conference: 1st MLSNP: 1st
- MLSNP Cup Playoffs: MLS Next Pro Cup Champions
- Top goalscorer: League: Pedrinho, Tarik Scott (10 goals); All: Pedrinho (13 goals)
- Highest home attendance: 1,887 March 15, 7,692 November 9 Playoffs
- Lowest home attendance: 732 August 17
- Average home league attendance: 1,090 Regular Season, 3,382 Playoffs, 1,599 Overall
- Biggest win: NTX 8–2 MU2 (MLSNP) (10/6)
- Biggest defeat: Houston Dynamo 2 4–0 NTX (7/21); St. Louis City 2 4–0 NTX (8/25)
Home colors	Away colors
- All statistics correct as of 01:28, April 23, 2024 (UTC).

The 2024 North Texas SC season is the club's sixth season. The first three seasons North Texas SC competed in USL League One, including the inaugural 2019 season. North Texas SC was the inaugural champions in USL League One. In December 2021, North Texas SC announced that they would compete in the inaugural MLS Next Pro season, a new division three league in American soccer.

== Staff ==
Position	Name
General manager	(England) Matt Denny
Head coach	(Brazil) Michel
Assistant coach	(Wales) John Gall
Goalkeeping coach (interim)	(United States) Kyle Zobeck

=== Current roster ===
As of July 3, 2024

No.	Pos.	Nation	Player
2	DF	JAM	Malachi Molina
4	DF	USA	Turner Humphrey
5	DF	MSR	Nico Gordon
7	MF	CIV	Abdoul Zanne
8	MF	USA	Nick Mendonca
9	FW	ARG	Lautaro Taboada
10	MF	BRA	Pedrinho
12	DF	USA	Tyshawn Rose
13	GK	USA	Antonio Carrera
14	FW	POL	Daniel Baran
15	DF	USA	Isaiah Parker
16	FW	USA	Diego Pepi
18	MF	HAI	Carl Sainté
20	FW	CGO	Leonard Londe
21	MF	USA	Dylan Lacy
22	GK	USA	Victor Darub
23	FW	USA	Logan Farrington
24	DF	USA	Amet Korça
27	FW	USA	Herbert Endeley
28	DF	DEN	Mads Westergren
30	GK	USA	Michael Collodi
32	MF	USA	Nolan Norris
34	MF	USA	Alejandro Urzua
35	MF	USA	Tomas Pondeca
36	MF	USA	Malik Henry-Scott
37	DF	USA	Zach Molomo
39	MF	USA	Jonah Gibson
40	DF	USA	Adrian Anguiano
41	MF	JAM	Tarik Scott
47	MF	USA	Christopher Cook
50	MF	USA	Diego García
51	MF	MEX	Anthony Ramirez
55	DF	USA	Luke Shreiner
57	GK	COL	Nicolas Arango
79	MF	USA	Leonardo Orejarena
99	FW	ROU	Enes Sali
—	DF	USA	Isaiah Kaakoush
—	DF	USA	Kaka Scabin

Signed to first team contract with FC Dallas.
FC Dallas Academy player.

== Transfers ==
=== In ===
Date	Position	No.	Name	From	Fee	Ref.
October 5, 2023	DF	23	(United States) Tyshawn Rose	(United States) North Texas SC	Exercised Option	
October 5, 2023	MF	27	(United States) Tomas Pondeca	(United States) North Texas SC	Exercised Option	
October 12, 2023	GK	22	(Brazil) Victor Darub	(Brazil) SAF Botafogo FR	Undisclosed	
November 23, 2023	MF	79	(United States) Leonardo Orejarena	(United States) Barça Residency Academy USA	$100,000 GAM	
December 15, 2023	MF	10	(Brazil) Pedrinho	(Brazil) CR Flamengo		
December 20, 2023	FW	20	(Republic of the Congo) Leonard Londe	(United States) SKM Academy Football Club		
January 12, 2024	GK	30	(United States) Michael Collodi	(United States) Columbia Lions		
February 2, 2024	DF	5	(Montserrat) Nico Gordon	(England) Birmingham City		
February 27, 2024	MF	51	(United States) Anthony Ramirez	(United States) FC Dallas Academy		
March 8, 2024	MF	8	(United States) Nick Mendonca	(United States) Minnesota United FC 2		
March 12, 2024	DF	4	(United States) Turner Humphrey	(United States) Oregon State Beavers		
March 27, 2024	DF		(Denmark) Mads Westergren	(United States) SMU Mustangs		
May 9, 2024	DF		(United States) Isaiah Kaakoush	(United States) Barça Residency Academy USA	Signing	
July 19, 2024	DF		(Brazil) Kaka Scabin	(United States) FC Dallas Academy	Signing	
August 8, 2024	MF		(Honduras) Jaidyn Contreras	(United States) FC Dallas Academy	Signing	

=== Loan In ===
No.	Pos.	Player	Loaned from	Start	End	Source
7	MF	(Ivory Coast) Abdoul Zanne	(Ivory Coast) ASEC Mimosas	December 7, 2023	December 31, 2024	

=== Out ===
Date	Position	No.	Name	To	Type	Fee	Ref.
October 5, 2023	FW	10	(Ghana) Hope Avayevu		Option declined	N/A	
October 5, 2023	MF	8	(Brazil) Theo Henrique		Option declined	N/A	
October 5, 2023	DF	3	(Brazil) Henri	(Brazil) Mirassol Futebol Clube	Option declined	N/A	
October 5, 2023	GK	44	(Republic of Ireland) Michael Webber		Option declined	N/A	
October 5, 2023	DF	2	(United States) Thabo Nare		Option declined	N/A	
October 5, 2023	FW	9	(United States) Pablo Torre		Option declined	N/A	
October 5, 2023	DF	5	(Colombia) Manuel Caicedo	(Colombia) Internacional F.C. de Palmira Under-20	Loan expired	N/A	
October 5, 2023	DF	7	(Colombia) Yeicar Perlaza	(Colombia) Atlético Nacional Under-20	Loan expired	N/A	
October 5, 2023	MF	20	(United States) Alejandro Araneda		Out of contract	N/A	
October 5, 2023	MF		(United States) André Costa		Out of contract	N/A	
December 14, 2023	MF	80	(United States) Alejandro Urzua	(United States) FC Dallas	Signed with first team	N/A	
December 15, 2023	MF	27	(United States) Tomas Pondeca	(United States) FC Dallas	Signed with first team	N/A	

== Non-competitive fixtures ==
=== Preseason ===
February 15	Richland College	0–1	North Texas SC	Dallas, Texas
		Report	Taboada

February 17	FC Dallas	0–0	North Texas SC	Frisco, Texas
		Report		Stadium: Toyota Stadium

February 26	Austin FC II	1–2	North Texas SC	Austin, Texas
	75'	Report	Garcia 65'; Lacy 88'	Stadium: Parmar Field

March 2	North Texas SC	1–3	SMU	Frisco, Texas
	Scott 10'	Report	25'; 28'; 77'

== Competitive fixtures ==
=== Standings ===
Pos	Div	Team	Pld	W	SOW	SOL	L	GF	GA	GD	Pts	Qualification
1	FR	North Texas SC	28	16	6	2	4	56	32	+24	62	Qualification for the Playoffs
2	FR	St. Louis City 2	28	17	1	3	7	53	35	+18	56	Qualification for the Playoffs
3	PC	The Town FC	28	13	4	4	7	41	28	+13	51	Qualification for the Playoffs
4	PC	Tacoma Defiance	28	13	2	3	10	59	53	+6	46	Qualification for the Playoffs
5	PC	Los Angeles FC 2	28	12	3	3	10	51	54	−3	45	Qualification for the Playoffs

Source: MLSNP Western Conference
Rules for classification: 1) points; 2) total wins; 3) total goal differential; 4) total goals scored; 5) fewer disciplinary points; 6) away goal differential; 7) away goals scored; 8) home goals differential; 9) home goals scored; 10) coin toss (2 clubs tied) or drawing of lots (≥3 clubs tied)

=== League ===
Matchday	Date	Opponent	Venue	Location	Result (Note: North Texas SC's score written first)	Scorers	Attendance	Referee	Position
1	March 15	Whitecaps FC 2	Choctaw Stadium	Arlington, Texas	0–0 (2–4 p)		1,887	Corbyn May	5th
2	March 24	St. Louis City 2	CityPark	St. Louis, Missouri	1–1 (9–8 p)	Scott 42'		Laura Rodriguez	9th
3	April 6	The Town FC	Choctaw Stadium	Arlington, Texas	1–1 (5–4 p)	García 90+7'	812	Olvin Oliva	6th
4	April 14	Tacoma Defiance	Choctaw Stadium	Arlington, Texas	2–1	Scott 4', Sali 45+2'	936	Mark Verso	6th
5	April 21	Colorado Rapids 2	CIBER Field	Denver, Colorado	2–0	Pedrinho 87', Scott 90+10'		Ryan Farrel	5th
6	April 28	Houston Dynamo 2	Choctaw Stadium	Arlington, Texas	2–2 (5–4 p)	Sali 9'; García 53'; Gordon 62' OG	823	Matthew Corrigan	5th
7	May 5	Sporting Kansas City II	Rock Chalk Park	Lawrence, Kansas	2–0	Molina 29', 69'		Shawn Tehini	3rd
8	May 12	The Town FC	Saint Mary's Stadium	Moraga, California	0–1			Kelsey Harms	5th
9	May 18	Portland Timbers 2	Choctaw Stadium	Arlington, Texas	2–1	García 8', Pedrinho 34'	967	Mario Maric	1st
10	May 24	Real Monarchs	Choctaw Stadium	Arlington, Texas	2–1	Pedrinho 36' Scott 53'	804	Lorenzo Hernandez	1st
11	June 2	Los Angeles FC 2	Titan Stadium	Fullerton, California	4–0	Scott 21' 42', Garcia 67', Pepi 87'		Ricardo Fierro	1st
12	June 9	Minnesota United FC 2	National Sports Center	Blaine, Minnesota	3–0	Pedrinho 21', Zanne 80', Sali 90+1'		Gerald Flores	1st
13	June 22	Austin FC II	Choctaw Stadium	Arlington, Texas	3–3 (5–3 p)	Sali 12', Pedrinho 60', Scott 79' Zanne 89' o.g.	1,658	Benjamin Meyer	1st
14	June 30	Real Monarchs	Zions Bank Stadium	Herriman, Utah	2–1	Sali 63' (p), Parker 78'		Jaclyn Metz	2nd
15	July 3	Minnesota United FC 2	Choctaw Stadium	Arlington, Texas	4–0	Urzua 24', Ramirez 54', Henry-Scott 63', Sali 67'	1,079	Ryan Shanklin	1st
16	July 14	Colorado Rapids 2	CIBER Field	Denver, Colorado	0–2			Brad Jensen	2nd
17	July 21	Houston Dynamo 2	Shell Energy Stadium	Houston, Texas	0–4			Collins Gitau	2nd
18	July 27	St. Louis City 2	Choctaw Stadium	Arlington, Texas	2–1	Henry-Scott 13', Sali 53'	1,696	Luis Diego Arroyo	1st
19	August 2	Austin FC II	Parmar Field	Austin, Texas	1–1 (4–5 p)	Endeley 22'		Melvin Rivas	1st
20	August 10	Sporting Kansas City II	Choctaw Stadium	Arlington, Texas	2–0	Ramirez 6', Pedrinho 49'	1,019	Jeremy Scheer	1st
21	August 17	Houston Dynamo 2	Choctaw Stadium	Arlington, Texas	4–1	Scott 9', Pedrinho 49', 69', Pondeca 90+4'	732	Ryan Farrell	1st
22	August 25	St. Louis City 2	CityPark	St. Louis, Missouri	0–4			Rebecca Pagan	1st
23	September 1	Colorado Rapids 2	Choctaw Stadium	Arlington, Texas	2–2 (5–4 p)	Pondeca 83', Ramirez 90'	826	Habeeb Hooshmand	1st
24	September 8	Whitecaps FC 2	Swangard Stadium	Burnaby, Canada	1–0	Scott 11'		Niko Jecanski	1st
25	September 11	Ventura County FC	William Rolland Stadium	Thousand Oaks, California	3–1	Norris 62', Ramirez 64', García 69'		Adam Zarrin	1st
26	September 22	Austin FC II	Choctaw Stadium	Arlington, Texas	2–1	Pedrinho 22', García 90+7'	1,228	JC Griggs	1st
27	September 29	Sporting Kansas City II	Swope Soccer Village	Kansas City, Missouri	1–1 (4–1 p)	Kaakoush 90+1'		Velimir Stefanovic	1st
28	October 6	Minnesota United FC 2	Choctaw Stadium	Arlington, Texas	8–2	Endeley 2', Pedrinho 16', Scott 39', Sali 45+7', Pondeca 67' 80', Henry-Scott 75', Garcia 83'	787	Drew Klemp	1st

=== Playoffs ===
Round	Date	Opponent	Venue	Location	Result (Note: North Texas SC's score written first)	Scorers	Attendance	Referee
Conference Quarterfinals	October 20	Whitecaps FC 2	Choctaw Stadium	Arlington, Texas	3–2	Endeley 8', García 29', Pondeca 85'	1,693	Lorenzo Hernandez
Conference Semifinals	October 26	Tacoma Defiance	Choctaw Stadium	Arlington, Texas	4–1	Pedrinho 20', Farrington 48', Sainté 66', Ramirez 77'	1,744	Gerald Flores
Western Conference Final	November 2	St. Louis City 2	Choctaw Stadium	Arlington, Texas	3–0	Ramirez 105+1', Pedrinho 108', Henry-Scott 120	2,397	Elijio Arreguin
2024 MLS Next Pro Cup Final	November 9	Philadelphia Union II	Toyota Stadium	Frisco, Texas	3–2	Farrington 51', Sali 67', Pedrinho 90+1'	7,692	Joshua Encarnacion

== Statistics ==
Numbers after plus-sign(+) denote appearances as a substitute.

=== Appearances and goals ===
No.	Pos	Nat	Player	Total		MLS Next Pro		MLSNP Playoffs	
No.	Pos	Nat	Player	Apps	Goals	Apps	Goals	Apps	Goals
2	MF	(Jamaica) JAM	Malachi Molina	12	2	8+4	2	0+0	0
4	DF	(United States) USA	Turner Humphrey	28	0	18+8	0	0+2	0
5	DF	(Montserrat) MSR	Nico Gordon	26	0	21+1	0	4+0	0
6	MF	(Denmark) DEN	Mads Westergen	26	0	16+6	0	4+0	0
7	MF	(Ivory Coast) CIV	Abdoul Zanne	27	1	13+11	1	1+2	0
8	MF	(United States) USA	Nick Mendonca	25	0	6+16	0	0+3	0
9	DF	(Argentina) ARG	Lautaro Taboada	4	0	0+4	0	0+0	0
10	MF	(Brazil) BRA	Pedrinho	23	13	14+5	10	4+0	3
12	DF	(United States) USA	Tyshawn Rose	11	0	6+2	0	3+0	0
13	GK	(United States) USA	Antonio Carrera	4	0	4+0	0	0+0	0
14	DF	(Poland) POL	Daniel Baran	14	0	3+11	0	0+0	0
15	FW	(United States) USA	Isaiah Parker	13	1	12+1	1	0+0	0
16	FW	(United States) USA	Diego Pepi	10	1	4+6	1	0+0	0
18	MF	(Haiti) HAI	Carl Fred Sainté	12	1	8+0	0	4+0	1
20	MF	(Republic of the Congo) CGO	Leonard Londe	0	0	0+0	0	0+0	0
21	MF	(United States) USA	Dylan Lacy	5	0	2+3	0	0+0	0
22	GK	(Brazil) BRA	Victor Darub	2	0	1+1	0	0+0	0
23	FW	(United States) USA	Logan Farrington	5	2	1+0	0	4+0	2
24	DF	(United States) USA	Amet Korça	19	0	17+2	0	0+0	0
25	DF	(United States) USA	Cauã Scabin	1	0	0+1	0	0+0	0
27	FW	(United States) USA	Herbert Endeley	23	3	19+0	2	4+0	1
30	GK	(United States) USA	Michael Collodi	27	0	23+0	0	4+0	0
32	DF	(United States) USA	Nolan Norris	16	1	12+0	1	4+0	0
34	FW	(United States) USA	Alejandro Urzua	10	1	5+5	1	0+0	0
35	MF	(United States) USA	Tomas Pondeca	19	5	13+2	4	0+4	1
36	MF	(United States) USA	Malik Henry-Scott	23	4	11+10	3	0+2	1
37	DF	(United States) USA	Zach Molomo	1	0	0+1	0	0+0	0
39	MF	(United States) USA	Jonah Gibson	1	0	0+1	0	0+0	0
40	DF	(United States) USA	Adrian Anguiano	1	0	0+1	0	0+0	0
41	FW	(Jamaica) JAM	Tarik Scott	24	10	20+1	10	0+3	0
42	MF	(United States) USA	Jose Contreras	1	0	0+1	0	0+0	0
46	DF	(United States) USA	Isaiah Kaakoush	1	1	0+1	1	0+0	0
47	MF	(United States) USA	Christopher Cook	1	0	0+1	0	0+0	0
50	MF	(United States) USA	Diego Garcia	30	8	22+4	7	4+0	1
51	FW	(United States) USA	Anthony Ramirez	27	6	12+11	4	0+4	2
52	MF	(United States) USA	Landon Hickam	1	0	0+1	0	0+0	0
55	DF	(United States) USA	Luke Shreiner	1	0	0+1	0	0+0	0
79	MF	(United States) USA	Leonardo Orejarena	2	0	1+1	0	0+0	0
99	MF	(Romania) ROU	Enes Sali	29	9	20+5	8	4+0	1

- Last updated: November 9, 2024
- Source: https://www.mlsnextpro.com/stats/players/#season=2024&competition=mls-next-pro&club=15140&statType=general&position=all

=== Top scorers ===
Rank	Position	Number	Name	MLS Next Pro	MLSNP Playoffs	Total
1	MF	10	(Brazil) Pedrinho	10	3	13
2	MF	41	(Jamaica) Tarik Scott	10	0	10
3	MF	99	(Romania) Enes Sali	8	1	9
4	FW	51	(United States) Diego Garcia	7	1	8
5	MF	51	(United States) Anthony Ramirez	4	2	6
6	MF	35	(United States) Tomas Pondeca	4	1	5
7	MF	36	(United States) Malik Henry-Scott	3	1	4
8	FW	27	(United States) Herbert Endeley	2	1	3
9	MF	2	(Jamaica) Malachi Molina	2	0	2
9	FW	23	(United States) Logan Farrington	0	2	2
11	MF	6	(Ivory Coast) Abdoul Zanne	1	0	1
11	DF	15	(United States) Isaiah Parker	1	0	1
11	FW	16	(United States) Diego Pepi	1	0	1
11	DF	32	(United States) Nolan Norris	1	0	1
11	MF	34	(United States) Alejandro Urzua	1	0	1
11	DF	46	(United States) Isaiah Kaakoush	1	0	1
11	MF	18	(Haiti) Carl Fred Sainté	0	1	1
Total				56	13	69

- Last updated: November 9, 2024
- Source: https://www.mlsnextpro.com/stats/players/#season=2024&competition=mls-next-pro&club=15140&statType=general&position=all

=== Top assists ===
Rank	Position	Number	Name	MLS Next Pro	MLSNP Playoffs	Total
1	MF	10	(Brazil) Pedrinho	10	3	13
2	FW	27	(United States) Herbert Endeley	4	3	7
3	MF	99	(Romania) Enes Sali	5	0	5
4	MF	51	(United States) Anthony Ramirez	4	0	4
4	MF	50	(United States) Diego Garcia	3	1	4
6	MF	41	(Jamaica) Tarik Scott	3	0	3
6	DF	12	(United States) Tyshawn Rose	2	1	3
8	DF	15	(United States) Isaiah Parker	2	0	2
8	MF	18	(Haiti) Carl Fred Sainté	2	0	2
8	MF	28	(Denmark) Mads Westergren	2	0	2
8	DF	32	(United States) Nolan Norris	2	0	2
8	FW	23	(United States) Logan Farrington	1	1	2
8	MF	36	(United States) Malik Henry-Scott	1	1	2
8	MF	51	(United States) Tomas Pondeca	0	2	2
15	MF	7	(Ivory Coast) Abdoul Zanne	1	0	1
15	DF	14	(Poland) Daniel Baran	1	0	1
15	MF	24	(United States) Amet Korça	1	0	1
15	GK	30	(United States) Michael Collodi	1	0	1
Total				45	12	57

- Last updated: November 9, 2024
- Source: https://www.mlsnextpro.com/stats/players/#season=2024&competition=mls-next-pro&club=15140&statType=general&position=all

=== Disciplinary record ===
No.	Pos.	Player	MLS Next Pro			MLSNP Playoffs			Total		
No.	Pos.	Player	Booked	(yellow card) (yellow-red card)	Sent off (straight red)	Booked	(yellow card) (yellow-red card)	Sent off (straight red)	Booked	(yellow card) (yellow-red card)	Sent off (straight red)
2	DF	(Jamaica) Malachi Molina	3	0	0	0	0	0	3	0	0
4	DF	(United States) Turner Humphreys	2	0	0	0	0	0	2	0	0
5	DF	(Montserrat) Nico Gordon	5	0	0	0	0	0	5	0	0
6	DF	(Denmark) Mads Westergren	2	0	0	0	0	0	2	0	0
7	MF	(Ivory Coast) Abdoul Zanne	0	0	1	1	0	0	1	0	1
8	MF	(United States) Nick Mendonca	2	0	0	0	0	0	2	0	0
9	FW	(Argentina) Lautaro Taboada	0	0	0	0	0	0	0	0	0
10	MF	(Brazil) Pedrinho	3	0	0	1	0	0	4	0	0
12	DF	(United States) Tyshawn Rose	2	0	0	0	0	1	2	0	1
14	FW	(Poland) Daniel Baran	1	0	0	0	0	0	1	0	0
15	DF	(United States) Isaiah Parker	1	0	0	0	0	0	1	0	0
16	FW	(United States) Diego Pepi	2	0	0	0	0	0	2	0	0
18	MF	(Haiti) Carl Fred Sainté	2	0	0	0	0	0	2	0	1
20	FW	(Republic of the Congo) Leonard Londe	0	0	0	0	0	0	0	0	0
21	MF	(United States) Dylan Lacy	0	0	0	0	0	0	0	0	0
22	GK	(Brazil) Victor Darub	0	0	0	0	0	0	0	0	0
24	DF	(United States) Amet Korça	7	0	0	0	0	0	7	0	0
27	FW	(United States) Herbert Endeley	3	0	0	2	0	0	5	0	0
30	GK	(United States) Michael Collodi	1	0	1	0	0	0	1	0	1
32	DF	(United States) Nolan Norris	6	0	0	1	0	0	7	0	0
34	MF	(United States) Alejandro Urzua	2	0	0	0	0	0	2	0	0
35	MF	(United States) Tomas Pondeca	7	0	0	1	0	0	8	0	0
36	MF	(United States) Malik Henry-Scott	2	0	0	0	0	0	2	0	0
40	DF	(United States) Adrian Anguiano	0	0	0	0	0	0	0	0	0
41	MF	(Jamaica) Tarik Scott	8	1	0	1	0	0	9	1	0
46	DF	(United States) Isaiah Kaakoush	1	0	0	0	0	0	1	0	0
50	MF	(United States) Diego Garcia	2	0	0	0	0	0	2	0	0
51	MF	(United States) Anthony Ramirez	3	0	0	0	0	0	3	0	0
55	DF	(United States) Luke Shreiner	0	0	0	0	0	0	0	0	0
79	MF	(United States) Leonardo Orejarena	0	0	0	0	0	0	0	0	0
99	FW	(Romania) Enes Sali	4	1	0	1	0	0	5	1	0
Total			71	2	2	8	0	1	79	2	3

- Last updated: November 9, 2024
- Source: https://www.mlsnextpro.com/stats/players/#season=2024&competition=mls-next-pro&club=15140&statType=general&position=all

== Awards and honors ==
=== MLS NEXT Pro Team of the Matchweek ===
MatchWeek	Ref
6	
8	
12	
30	

=== MLS NEXT Pro Player of the Matchweek ===
Matchweek	Player	Ref
23	(Brazil) Pedrinho	

=== MLS NEXT Pro Goalkeeper of the Month ===
Month	Player	Ref
May	(United States) Michael Collodi	

=== MLS NEXT Pro Midseason Awards ===
Award	Player	Ref
Goalkeeper	(United States) Michael Collodi	

=== MLS NEXT Pro Coach of the Month ===
Coach	Month	Ref
(Brazil) Michel Garbini	September	

=== MLS NEXT Pro Goalkeeper of the Year ===
Goalkeeper	Ref
(United States) Michael Collodi	

=== MLS NEXT Pro Best XI ===
Player	Position	Ref
(United States) Michael Collodi	Goalkeeper	
(Montserrat) Nico Gordon	Defender	
