= 2023 North Texas SC season =

North Texas SC
2023 season
- Owner: FC Dallas (Clark and Dan Hunt)
- Chairman: Matt Denny
- Head coach: Javier Cano
- Stadium: Choctaw Stadium
- MLSNP: Western Conference: 11th Place
- MLSNP Cup Playoffs: did not qualify
- Top goalscorer: Mulato (11)
- Highest home attendance: 1,298
- Lowest home attendance: 787
- Average home league attendance: 1,058 (one game missing)
- Biggest win: STL 1–4 NTX (5/7)
- Biggest defeat: NTX 1–4 VAN (4/9); ATX 3–0 NTX (4/12)
Home colors	Away colors

The 2023 North Texas SC season was the club's fifth season. The first three seasons North Texas SC competed in USL League One, including their championship year in the inaugural 2019 season. In December 2021, North Texas SC announced that they would compete in the inaugural MLS Next Pro season, a new division three league in American soccer.

== Staff ==
Position	Name
General manager	(England) Matt Denny
Head coach	(Spain) Javier Cano
Assistant coach	(Brazil) Michel
Assistant coach	(Canada) Vikram Virk
Assistant coach	(United States) John Gall
Goalkeeping coach (interim)	(United States) Kyle Zobeck

== Players ==
As of March 30, 2023

No.	Pos.	Nation	Player
1	GK	USA	Julian Eyestone
3	DF	BRA	Henri
5	DF	COL	Manuel Caicedo (on loan from Cortuluá)
7	DF	COL	Yeicar Perlaza
8	MF	BRA	Theo Henrique
9	FW	USA	Pablo Torre
10	MF	GHA	Hope Avayevu
11	MF	BRA	Andre Luque
12	DF	USA	Tyshawn Rose
16	MF	HAI	Carl Fred Sainté
20	DF	USA	Alejandro Araneda
21	FW	COL	José Mulato
27	MF	USA	Tomas Pondeca
28	FW	USA	Herbert Endeley
29	GK	IRL	Michael Webber
31	MF	JAM	Malachi Molina
32	DF	USA	Nolan Norris
34	FW	HON	Nayrobi Vargas
36	MF	USA	Diego Hernandez
42	GK	USA	Justin Stewart
50	MF	USA	Diego García
51	FW	MEX	Anthony Ramirez
68	MF	USA	Santiago Ferreira
77	MF	USA	Bernard Kamungo
80	MF	USA	Alejandro Urzua

Signed to first team contract with FC Dallas.
FC Dallas Academy player.

== Transfers ==
=== In ===
Date	Position	No.	Name	From	Fee	Ref.
November 3, 2022	MF	16	(Haiti) Carl Sainté	(United States) New Mexico United		
February 7, 2023	DF	12	(United States) Tyshawn Rose	(United States) Boston College		
March, 2023	MF	50	(United States) Diego Garcia	(United States) El Paso Locomotive FC Academy		
March 7, 2023	MF	80	(United States) Alejandro Urzua	(United States) FC Dallas Academy		
March 10, 2023	MF	27	(United States) Tomas Pondeca	(France) Pairs Acasa		
March 20, 2023	MF	8	(Brazil) Theo Henrique	(Brazil) América Futebol Clube (MG)		
March 21, 2023	GK	29	(Republic of Ireland) Michael Webber	(United States) Bowdoin College		

=== Loan In ===
No.	Pos.	Player	Loaned from	Start	End	Source
7	DF	(Colombia) Yeicar Perlaza	(Colombia) Atlético Nacional	January 17, 2023	December 31, 2023	
	DF	(Colombia) Manuel Cacido	(Colombia) Cortuluá	February 1, 2023	December 31, 2023	
3	DF	(Brazil) Henri Santos	(Brazil) Palmeiras	February 28, 2023	December 31, 2023	

=== Out ===
Date	Position	No.	Name	To	Type	Fee	Ref.
November 8, 2022	DF	4	(Canada) Paul Amedume	(Canada) Pacific FC	Loan Expires	N/A	
November 8, 2022	MF	8	(United States) Blaine Ferri	(United States) FC Tulsa	Option Declined	N/A	
November 8, 2022	DF	5	(United States) Chase Niece		Option Declined	N/A	
November 8, 2022	MF	6	(United States) Tomás Lacerda		Option Declined	N/A	
November 8, 2022	DF	12	(United States) Blake Pope	(United States) Portland Timbers 2	Option Declined	N/A	
November 8, 2022	FW	17	(Brazil) Luis Miguel		Option Declined	N/A	
November 8, 2022	GK	1	(Brazil) Felipe Carneiro	(Brazil) América Futebol Clube (RN)	Option Declined	N/A	

=== Loan out ===
No.	Pos.	Player	Loaned to	Start	End	Source

== Non-competitive fixtures ==
=== Preseason ===
February 18, 2022	North Texas SC	1–1	Foro S.C.	Frisco, Texas
12:00 pm CT	88'	Report	5'	Stadium: Toyota Soccer Center

February 25, 2022	North Texas SC	1–0	DKSC	Frisco, Texas
11:00 am CT	Hernandez 90'	Report		Stadium: Toyota Soccer Center

March 3, 2023	North Texas SC	3–1	SMU	Frisco, Texas
7:00 pm CT	Avayevu 12'; Pepi 56'; Tomas 63'	Report	33'	Stadium: Toyota Soccer Center

March 9, 2023	North Texas SC	1–0	Sporting Kansas City II	Frisco, Texas
9:00 am CT	Avayevu 62'	Report		Stadium: Toyota Soccer Center

March 18, 2023	Houston Dynamo 2	v	North Texas SC	Houston, Texas
1:00 pm CT				Stadium: Aveva Stadium

== Competitive fixtures ==
=== MLS Next Pro ===
==== Standings ====
Pos	Div	Team	Pld	W	SOW	SOL	L	GF	GA	GD	Pts	Qualification
7	FR	Houston Dynamo 2	28	12	3	1	12	50	44	+6	43	Qualification for the Playoffs
8	FR	Minnesota United FC 2	28	10	5	3	10	50	52	−2	43	
9	FR	North Texas SC	28	9	1	7	11	43	45	−2	36	
10	PC	Portland Timbers 2	28	11	0	1	16	40	63	−23	34	
11	PC	Whitecaps FC 2	28	8	3	4	13	33	46	−13	34	

Source: MLSNP Western Conference
Rules for classification: 1) points; 2) total wins; 3) total goal differential; 4) total goals scored; 5) fewer disciplinary points; 6) away goal differential; 7) away goals scored; 8) home goals differential; 9) home goals scored; 10) coin toss (2 clubs tied) or drawing of lots (≥3 clubs tied)

==== Regular season ====
March 26, 2023 1	LAFC 2	0–1	North Texas SC	Fullerton, California
7:00 pm CT	Gaines (yellow card) 15'; Dollenmayer (yellow card) 22' (yellow-red card) 50'; Mallé (yellow card) 56'; Jaime (yellow card) 77'	Report	Avayevu 9', (yellow card) 80'; Urzua (yellow card) 57'; Rose (yellow card) 83'; Luque (yellow card) 89'	Stadium: Cal State Fullerton; Referee: Adorae Monroy

April 2, 2023 2	LA Galaxy II	0–1	North Texas SC	Carson, California
7:00 pm CT	Saldaña (yellow card) 43'; Essengue (yellow card) 45+1'	Report	Korça (yellow card) 23'; Essengue 44' (o.g.); Urzua (yellow card) 83'	Stadium: Dignity Health Sports Park; Referee: Alexis Da Silva

April 9, 2023 3	North Texas SC	1–4	Whitecaps FC 2	Arlington, Texas
7:30 pm CT	Sainté (yellow card) 20'; Luque 39'	Report	Amanda 13'; Linder 16'; Johnson 18'; Yao (yellow card) 39'; Johnston (yellow card) 68'; Aguilar 84'	Stadium: Choctaw Stadium; Attendance: 1,298; Referee: Melvin Rivas

April 12, 2023 4	Austin FC II	3–0	North Texas SC	Austin, Texas
7:00 pm CT	Noël 8' (pen.), 12'; Ocampo-Chavez 13'; Fodrey (yellow card) 14'; Las (yellow card) 87'	Report	Luque (yellow card) 42'; Rose (yellow card) 51'; Korça (yellow card) 66'	Stadium: Parmer Field; Referee: Gerald Flores

April 16, 2023 5	North Texas SC	2–1	Minnesota United FC 2	Arlington, Texas
7:30 pm	Perlaza (yellow card) 28'; Norris (yellow card) 39'; Henrique 60'; Endeley 81'; Mulato (yellow card) 82'; Sainté (yellow card) 89'; Pondeca (yellow card) 90+6'	Report	Bello 16'; Padelford (yellow card) 44'; Leatherman (yellow card) 76'	Stadium: Choctaw Stadium; Attendance: 1,202; Referee: Lorenzo Hernandez

April 21, 2023 6	North Texas SC	0–1	Real Monarchs	Arlington, Texas
7:30pm CT	Sainté (yellow card) 51'; Korça (yellow card) 90+3'	Report	Alba (yellow card) 26'; Nyeman 90+5'; Pierre (yellow card) 90+6'	Stadium: Choctaw Stadium; Attendance: 1,283; Referee: Abdou Ndiaye

April 30, 2023 7	Colorado Rapids 2	4–2	North Texas SC	Denver, Colorado
5:00 pm CT	Hanya (yellow card) 26', (goal) 63'; Amadou (yellow card) 48'; Malone 57'; Larraz 64'; Batiste 75'; Cabral (yellow card) 75'	Report	Avayevu 23' (pen.), 48', (yellow card) 23'; Endeley (yellow card) 35'; Rose (yellow card) (yellow-red card) 45+2'; Perlaza (yellow card) 83'	Stadium: University of Denver Soccer Stadium; Referee: Patricia McCracken

May 7, 2023 8	North Texas SC	4–1	St. Louis City SC 2	Arlington, Texas
7:30 pm CT	Norris (yellow card) 39'; Mulato 53', 69'; Endeley 82'; Avayevu 88'	Report	Schneider (yellow card) 25'; O'Malley (yellow card) 29'; Klein 40'; Kuzain (yellow card) 45+3'; Armstrong (red card) 54'	Stadium: Choctaw Stadium; Attendance: 1,111; Referee: Brad Jensen

May 12, 2023 9	San Jose Earthquakes II	0–0 (5–3 SO)	North Texas SC	San Jose, California
9:00 pm CT	Verhoeven (yellow card) 33'; Chow (yellow card) 70'; Cilley (yellow card) 90'	Report	Torre (yellow card) 37'; Perlaza (yellow card) 69'; Sainté (yellow card) 87'	Stadium: PayPal Park; Referee: Robert Vincze
	Shootout
	Blancas (penalty scored); Castro (penalty scored); Hategan (penalty scored); Mendoza (penalty scored); Cilley (penalty scored)		(penalty scored) Henri; (penalty missed) Norris; (penalty scored) Hernandez; (penalty scored) Sainté

May 21, 2023 10	North Texas SC	3–3 (5–6 SO)	Houston Dynamo 2	Arlington, Texas
7:30 pm CT	Sainté 6', (yellow card) 39'; Mulato 17'; Urzua (yellow card) 79'; Hernandez 82'	Report	Udanoh (yellow card) 5'; González 35'; Evans 71'; Reid 90+4'	Stadium: Choctaw Stadium; Referee: Alyssa Nichols
	Shootout
	Urzua (penalty scored); Luque (penalty missed); Henri (penalty scored); Rose (penalty scored); Hernandez (penalty missed); Vargas (penalty scored); Endeley (penalty scored); Korça (penalty missed)		(penalty scored) Evans; (penalty scored) Ríos; (penalty missed) LeFlore; (penalty missed) Orejuela; (penalty scored) Reid; (penalty scored) Soto; (penalty scored) Rosas; (penalty scored) Juarez

May 25, 2023 11	North Texas SC	3–3 (2–4 SO)	Colorado Rapids 2	Arlington, Texas
7:30 pm CT	Santos 18'; García 27' (yellow card) 59'; Vargas 55'	Report 1Report 2	Brito 23'; Cabral 48'; Mitchell (yellow card) 67'; Larraz 83' (pen.); Edwards (yellow card) 86'; Malone (yellow card) 90'	Stadium: Choctaw Stadium; Attendance: 873; Referee: Austin Saini
	Shootout
	Urzua (penalty missed); Santos (penalty missed); Pondeca (penalty scored); Ferreira (penalty scored)		(penalty scored) Larraz; (penalty scored) Cabral; (penalty missed) Malone; (penalty scored) Chavarria; (penalty scored) Aguirre

May 28, 2023 12	St. Louis City SC 2	2–2 (5–4 SO)	North Texas SC	St. Louis, Missouri
5:00 pm CT	Jackson 2'; Perez (yellow card) 13'; Pidro (yellow card) 51'; O'Malley (yellow card) 67'; Palazzolo (yellow card) 89'	Report	Rose (yellow card) (yellow-red card) 23'; Urzua (yellow card) 30'; Vargas 41'; Pepi 62'; García (yellow card) 85'	Stadium: CityPark; Referee: Chris Ruska
	Shootout
	Schneider (penalty scored); Klein (penalty scored); Jensen (penalty scored); Wentzel (penalty missed); Kuzain (penalty scored); Pidro (penalty scored)		(penalty scored) Hernandez; (penalty scored) Henri; (penalty missed) Ferreira; (penalty scored) Pepi; (penalty scored) Sainté; (penalty missed) García

June 4, 2023 13	North Texas SC	2–0	LA Galaxy II	Arlington, Texas
7:30 pm CT	Sainté (yellow card) 29'; Santos (yellow card) 37'; Ramirez 50', 56'; Araneda (yellow card) 85'; Hernandez (yellow card) 89'	Match ReportReport 2	Téllez (yellow card) 80'; Essengue (yellow card) 86'	Stadium: Choctaw Stadium; Attendance: 787

June 10, 2023 14	Portland Timbers 2	2–0	North Texas SC	Portland, Oregon
7:00 pm CT	McCartney (yellow card) 15'; Penn 18', 59'; Griffith (yellow card) 25'; Bravo (yellow card) 67'	Report	Urzua (yellow card) 56'	Stadium: Providence Park; Referee: Brandon Stevis

June 16, 2023 15	North Texas SC	0–1	San Jose Earthquakes II	Arlington, Texas
7:30 pm	Luque (yellow card) 45+2'	Match Report Report 2	Edwards (yellow card) 64'; Medina 90+2'	Stadium: Choctaw Stadium; Attendance: 949; Referee: Lorenzo Hernandez

June 25, 2023 16	Sporting Kansas City II	1–1 (5–4 SO)	North Texas SC	Lawrence, Kansas
6:00 pm CT	Vidal 57'	Report	Urzua 41'; Korça (yellow card) 50'; Norris (yellow card) 70'; Avayevu (yellow card) 90+2'	Stadium: Rock Chalk Park; Referee: John Griggs
	Shootout
	Vidal (penalty scored); Bryant (penalty scored); Cicneros (penalty scored); Rosa (penalty scored); Rindov (penalty scored)		(penalty scored) Henrique; (penalty scored) Perlaza; (penalty scored) Vargas; (penalty scored) Rose; (penalty missed) Avayevu

July 2, 2023 17	North Texas SC	2–2 (8–7 SO)	LAFC 2	Arlington, Texas
7:30 pm CT	Araneda (yellow card) 45'; García 57'; Torre 85'	Report 1 Report 2	Aguirre 82'; Jaime 90'	Stadium: Choctaw Stadium; Attendance: 1,251; Referee: Ricardo Fierro
	Shootout
	Hernandez (penalty scored); Luque (penalty scored); Ramirez (penalty scored); Pondeca (penalty scored); Torre (penalty scored); Henri (penalty scored); Avayevu (penalty scored); Rose (penalty scored)		(penalty scored) Vazquez; (penalty scored) Bombino; (penalty scored) Romero; (penalty scored) Maia; (penalty scored) Romero; (penalty scored) Torres; (penalty scored) Jaime; (penalty missed) Wibowo

July 9, 2023 18	Tacoma Defiance	3–0	North Texas SC	Tukwila, Washington
10:00 pm CT	Santos 1' (o.g.); Rothrock 24' (yellow card) 38'; Urzua 53' (o.g.)	Report	Henrique (yellow card) 43'; Urzua (yellow card) 73'; Santos (yellow card) 80'; Pondeca (yellow card) 86'	Stadium: Starfire Sports Complex; Referee: Corbyn May

July 16, 2023 19	Houston Dynamo 2	2–1	North Texas SC	Houston, Texas
6:00 pm CT	Evans (yellow card) 25'; Maples (yellow card) 39'; Gonzalez 57'; LeFlore 66'; Castillo (yellow card) 68' (yellow-red card) 88'	Report	Torre 64'	Stadium: Aveva Stadium; Referee: Karen Callado

July 22, 2023 20	North Texas SC	1–2	Sporting Kansas City II	Arlington, Texas
7:30 pm	Mulato 11'; Santos (yellow card) 51'	Report 1 Report 2	Cruz 41'; Coan 45+2'; Mekideche (yellow card) 48'; Rad (yellow card) 84'; Duke (yellow card) 90+3'	Stadium: Choctaw Stadium; Attendance: 987; Referee: Luis Arroyo

July 29, 2023 21	North Texas SC	4–0	Portland Timbers 2	Arlington, Texas
7:30 pm CT	Santos (yellow card) 33'; Endeley 38'; Mulato 52', 56'; Pondeca 90+1'	Report 1 Report 2	Ortellao (yellow card) 45+3'; Monzón (yellow card) 72'; Ferdinand (yellow card) 81'	Stadium: Choctaw Stadium; Attendance: 1,012; Referee: Jalen Gray

August 5, 2023 22	Minnesota United FC 2	2–1	North Texas SC	Blaine, Minnesota
7:00 pm CT	Dunbar 47', 84'; Uche (yellow card) 90+1'; O'Driscoll (yellow card) 90+4'	Report	Mulato (yellow card) 62'; Araneda (yellow card) 86'; Pondeca 88'	Stadium: National Sports Center; Referee: Gabriele Giusti

August 12, 2023 23	Real Monarchs	1–1 (4–2 SO)	North Texas SC	Herriman, Utah
9:30 pm CT	Dillon (yellow card) 26'; Paul (yellow card) 35' (goal) 90+2'; Iskenderian (yellow card) 70'	Report	Mulato 32'; Endeley (yellow card) 46'; García (yellow card) 72'; Caicedo (yellow card) 90+2'	Stadium: Zions Bank Stadium; Referee: Nabil Bensalah
	Shootout
	Paul (penalty scored); Pierre (penalty scored); Storlie (penalty scored); Alba (penalty scored)		(penalty scored) Sainté; (penalty scored) Norris; (penalty missed) Ramirez; (penalty missed) Taboada

August 19, 2023 24	North Texas SC	2–2 (5–6 SO)	Tacoma Defiance	Arlington, Texas
7:30 pm	Pondeca 54'; García 67'; Santos (yellow card) 76'		Cissoko (yellow card) 53' (goal) 66' (pen.); Brunell 69'; Baker (yellow card) 89'	Stadium: Choctaw Stadium; Attendance: 1,086
	Shootout
	Santos (penalty scored); Torre (penalty scored); Pondeca (penalty scored); Avayevu (penalty scored); Pepi (penalty missed); Luque (penalty scored); Endeley (penalty missed)		(penalty scored) Rodrigues; (penalty scored) Cissoko; (penalty missed) Daroma; (penalty scored) Ovalle; (penalty scored) Miglietti; (penalty scored) Herrera; (penalty scored) Minoungou

August 25, 2023 25	Whitecaps FC 2	0–1	North Texas SC	Burnaby, Canada
9:00 pm CT	Aguillar (yellow card) 80'; Johnson (yellow card) 90+1'	Report	Mulato 82'; Torre (yellow card) 90+1'; Araneda (yellow card) 90+5'	Stadium: Swangard Stadium

September 3, 2023 26	North Texas SC	2–3	Colorado Rapids 2	Arlington, Texas
8:30 pm CT	Avayevu 7' (pen.); Mulato 30'; Pondeca (yellow card) 39'; Sainté (yellow card) 57'; Perlaza (yellow card) 89'	Report	Hanya 20'; Amadou (yellow card) 55'; Yapi 58'; Edwards (yellow card) 75'; Cabral 90+2'	Stadium: Choctaw Stadium; Attendance: 878; Referee: John Griggs

September 17, 2023 27	Houston Dynamo 2	1–3	North Texas SC	Houston, Texas
5:30 pm CT	Ndoye 29'; Auguste (yellow card) 55'; Gonzalez (yellow card) 79'; González (yellow card) 86'	Report	Santos (yellow card) 37' (goal) 67'; Luque (yellow card) 39'; Mulato 59'; Pondeca 75' (yellow card) 76'; Molina (yellow card) 78'; Carrera (yellow card) 90+1'; Lacy (yellow card) 90+2'	Stadium: Aveva Stadium

September 24, 2023 28	North Texas SC	3–1	Austin FC II	Arlington, Texas
4:00 pm CT	Endeley 22'; Korça (yellow card) 37'; Avayevu 38'; Mulato 46'; García (yellow card) 47'; Luque (yellow card) 76'; Sainté (yellow card) 90+1'	Report	Pineau 69'; Noël (yellow card) 80'	Stadium: Choctaw Stadium; Attendance: 1,031; Referee: Muhammad Hassan

== Statistics ==
Numbers after plus-sign(+) denote appearances as a substitute.

=== Appearances and goals ===
No.	Pos	Nat	Player	Total		MLS Next Pro		MLSNP Playoffs	
No.	Pos	Nat	Player	Apps	Goals	Apps	Goals	Apps	Goals
1	GK	(United States) USA	Julian Eyestone	8	0	8+0	0	0+0	0
2	DF	(United States) USA	Thabo Norre	0	0	0+0	0	0+0	0
3	DF	(Brazil) BRA	Henri	26	2	25+1	2	0+0	0
4	DF	(United States) USA	William Baker	2	0	2+0	0	0+0	0
5	DF	(Colombia) COL	Manuel Caicedo	12	0	9+3	0	0+0	0
7	MF	(Colombia) COL	Yeicar Perlaza	20	0	11+9	0	0+0	0
7	MF	(United States) USA	Bernard Kamungo	4	0	4+0	0	0+0	0
8	MF	(Brazil) BRA	Theo Henrique	20	1	10+10	1	0+0	0
9	FW	(United States) USA	Pablo Torre	14	2	4+10	2	0+0	0
10	FW	(Ghana) GHA	Hope Avayevu	21	6	18+3	6	0+0	0
11	MF	(Brazil) BRA	Andre Luque	28	1	23+5	1	0+0	0
12	DF	(United States) USA	Tyshawn Rose	19	0	19+0	0	0+0	0
13	GK	(United States) USA	Antonio Carrera	19	0	19+0	0	0+0	0
15	FW	(United States) USA	Isaiah Parker	0	0	0+0	0	0+0	0
16	FW	(United States) USA	Diego Pepi	12	1	0+12	1	0+0	0
17	MF	(United States) USA	Dylan Lacy	3	0	1+2	0	0+0	0
18	MF	(Haiti) HAI	Carl Fred Sainté	21	1	18+3	1	0+0	0
19	FW	(Argentina) ARG	Lautaro Taboada	6	0	1+5	0	0+0	0
20	MF	(United States) USA	Alejandro Araneda	21	0	9+12	0	0+0	0
21	FW	(Colombia) COL	José Mulato	20	11	20+0	11	0+0	0
24	DF	(United States) USA	Amet Korça	14	0	13+1	0	0+0	0
27	MF	(United States) USA	Tomas Pondeca	23	4	14+9	4	0+0	0
28	FW	(United States) USA	Herbert Endeley	17	4	16+1	4	0+0	0
29	GK	(Republic of Ireland) IRL	Michael Webber	0	0	0+0	0	0+0	0
30	MF	(United States) USA	Jared Salazar	6	0	2+4	0	0+0	0
31	MF	(Jamaica) JAM	Malachi Molina	6	0	2+4	0	0+0	0
32	DF	(United States) USA	Nolan Norris	13	0	13+0	0	0+0	0
34	FW	(Honduras) HON	Nayrobi Vargas	15	2	4+11	2	0+0	0
36	MF	(United States) USA	Luke Shreiner	1	0	0+1	0	0+0	0
36	MF	(United States) USA	Diego Hernandez	12	1	3+9	1	0+0	0
42	GK	(United States) USA	Justin Stewart	1	0	1+0	0	0+0	0
44	GK	(United States) USA	Michael Webber	0	0	0+0	0	0+0	0
48	MF	(United States) USA	Jared Aguilar	0	0	0+0	0	0+0	0
50	MF	(United States) USA	Diego Garcia	23	3	17+6	3	0+0	0
51	FW	(Mexico) MEX	Anthony Ramirez	14	2	7+7	2	0+0	0
57	GK	(Colombia) COL	Nicolas Arango Montoya	0	0	0+0	0	0+0	0
68	MF	(United States) USA	Santiago Ferreira	2	0	0+2	0	0+0	0
70	DF	(United States) USA	Mason Grimm	2	0	0+2	0	0+0	0
80	MF	(United States) USA	Alejandro Urzua	16	1	13+3	1	0+0	0
99	GK	(United States) USA	Kyle Zobeck	0	0	0+0	0	0+0	0

- Last updated: September 24, 2023
- Source: https://www.mlsnextpro.com/stats/players/#season=2023&competition=mls-next-pro&club=15140&statType=general&position=all

=== Top scorers ===
Rank	Position	Number	Name	MLS Next Pro	MLSNP Playoffs	Total
1	FW	21	(Colombia) José Mulato	11	0	11
2	MF	10	(Ghana) Hope Avayevu	6	0	6
3	MF	27	(United States) Tomas Pondeca	4	0	4
3	DF	28	(United States) Herbert Endeley	4	0	4
5	MF	50	(United States) Diego García	3	0	3
6	DF	3	(Brazil) Henri	2	0	2
6	FW	9	(United States) Pablo Torre	2	0	2
6	FW	34	(Honduras) Nayrobi Vargas	2	0	2
6	FW	51	(Mexico) Anthony Ramirez	2	0	2
10	MF	8	(Brazil) Theo Henrique	1	0	1
10	MF	11	(Brazil) André Luque	1	0	1
10	FW	16	(United States) Diego Pepi	1	0	1
10	MF	18	(Haiti) Carl Fred Sainté	1	0	1
10	MF	36	(United States) Diego Hernandez	1	0	1
10	MF	80	(United States) Alejandro Urzua	1	0	1
Total				43	0	43

- Last updated: September 24, 2023
- Source: https://www.mlsnextpro.com/stats/players/#season=2023&competition=mls-next-pro&club=15140&statType=general&position=all

=== Top assists ===
Rank	Position	Number	Name	MLS Next Pro	MLSNP Playoffs	Total
1	DF	12	(United States) Tyshawn Rose	5	0	5
2	FW	51	(Ghana) Hope Avayevu	4	0	4
3	MF	18	(Haiti) Carl Fred Sainté	3	0	3
3	FW	21	(Colombia) José Mulato	3	0	3
5	DF	28	(United States) Herbert Endeley	2	0	2
5	MF	50	(United States) Diego García	2	0	2
5	FW	51	(Mexico) Anthony Ramirez	2	0	2
5	MF	77	(United States) Bernard Kamungo	2	0	2
9	DF	7	(Colombia) Yeicar Perlaza	1	0	1
9	MF	8	(Brazil) Theo Henrique	1	0	1
9	FW	9	(United States) Pablo Torre	1	0	1
9	MF	17	(United States) Dylan Lacy	1	0	1
9	MF	30	(United States) Jared Salazar	1	0	1
9	MF	36	(United States) Diego Hernandez	1	0	1
Total				29	0	29

- Last updated: September 24, 2023
- Source: https://www.mlsnextpro.com/stats/players/#season=2023&competition=mls-next-pro&club=15140&statType=general&position=all

=== Disciplinary record ===
No.	Pos.	Player	MLS Next Pro			MLSNP Playoffs			Total		
No.	Pos.	Player	Booked	(yellow card) (yellow-red card)	Sent off (straight red)	Booked	(yellow card) (yellow-red card)	Sent off (straight red)	Booked	(yellow card) (yellow-red card)	Sent off (straight red)
1	GK	(United States) Julian Eyestone	0	0	0	0	0	0	0	0	0
3	DF	(Brazil) Henri	6	0	0	0	0	0	6	0	0
5	DF	(Colombia) Manuel Caicedo	1	0	0	0	0	0	1	0	0
7	DF	(Colombia) Yeicar Perlaza	4	0	0	0	0	0	4	0	0
8	MF	(Brazil) Theo Henrique	2	0	0	0	0	0	2	0	0
9	FW	(United States) Pablo Torre	3	0	0	0	0	0	3	0	0
10	FW	(Ghana) Hope Avayevu	3	0	0	0	0	0	3	0	0
11	MF	(Brazil) Andre Luque	6	0	0	0	0	0	6	0	0
12	DF	(United States) Tyshawn Rose	4	2	0	0	0	0	4	2	0
13	GK	(United States) Antonio Carrera	1	0	0	0	0	0	1	0	0
16	MF	(United States) Diego Pepi	1	0	0	0	0	0	1	0	0
17	MF	(United States) Dylan Lacy	1	0	0	0	0	0	1	0	0
18	MF	(Haiti) Carl Fred Sainté	9	0	0	0	0	0	9	0	0
20	DF	(United States) Alejandro Araneda	3	0	0	0	0	0	3	0	0
21	FW	(Colombia) José Mulato	2	0	0	0	0	0	2	0	0
24	DF	(United States) Amet Korça	5	0	0	0	0	0	5	0	0
27	MF	(United States) Tomas Pondeca	4	0	0	0	0	0	4	0	0
28	FW	(United States) Herbert Endeley	2	0	0	0	0	0	2	0	0
29	GK	(United States) Michael Webber	0	0	0	0	0	0	0	0	0
31	MF	(Jamaica) Malachi Molina	1	0	0	0	0	0	1	0	0
32	DF	(United States) Nolan Norris	3	0	0	0	0	0	3	0	0
36	MF	(United States) Diego Hernandez	1	0	0	0	0	0	1	0	0
42	GK	(United States) Justin Stewart	0	0	0	0	0	0	0	0	0
50	MF	(United States) Diego Garcia	4	0	0	0	0	0	4	0	0
51	FW	(Mexico) Anthony Ramirez	0	0	0	0	0	0	0	0	0
68	MF	(United States) Santiago Ferreira	0	0	0	0	0	0	0	0	0
77	MF	(United States) Bernard Kamungo	0	0	0	0	0	0	0	0	0
80	MF	(United States) Alejandro Urzua	6	0	0	0	0	0	6	0	0
Total			71	2	4	0	0	0	71	2	4

- Last updated: September 24, 2023
- Source: https://www.mlsnextpro.com/stats/players/#season=2023&competition=mls-next-pro&club=15140&statType=general&position=all

=== MLS NEXT Pro Player of the Matchday ===
Matchday	Player	Reason	Ref
24	(United States) Antonio Carrera	10 saves vs Whitecaps FC 2	

=== MLS NEXT Pro Rising Star of The Matchday ===
Matchday	Player	Ref
9	(United States) Diego Hernandez	
11	(United States) Anthony Ramirez	

=== MLS NEXT Pro Rising Star of the Month ===
Month	Player	Ref
May	(United States) Diego Hernandez	
