= 2024 FC Dallas season =

FC Dallas
2024 season
- Owner: Clark and Dan Hunt
- Head coach: Peter Luccin (interim)
- Stadium: Toyota Stadium
- MLS: Conference: 11th Overall: 19th
- MLS Cup playoffs: Did not qualify
- U.S. Open Cup: Quarterfinals
- Leagues Cup: Group stage
- Top goalscorer: League: Petar Musa (16); All: Petar Musa (17)
- Highest home attendance: 19,096; Multiple games
- Lowest home attendance: 4,511 (May 7 vs. Memphis 901 FC) U.S. Open Cup
- Average home league attendance: 19,096
- Biggest win: 5–3 (June 19 vs. Minnesota United FC); 3–1 (September 21 vs. Los Angeles FC); 2–0 (April 27 vs. Houston Dynamo FC) (June 15 vs. St. Louis City SC)
- Biggest defeat: 1–3 (March 16 vs. Vancouver Whitecaps FC) (May 4 vs. Toronto FC) (May 29 vs. LA Galaxy) (September 28 vs. Orlando City SC)
Primary colors	Alternate colors

The 2024 FC Dallas season was the Major League Soccer club's 29th season and third under head coach Nico Estévez until his dismissal from the club on June 9. Assistant coach Peter Luccin took over as interim manager for the remainder of the year. The club also participated in the fourth edition of the Leagues Cup and the 109th edition of the U.S. Open Cup.

== Transfers ==
=== In ===
No.	Pos.	Nat.	Name	Age	Moving from	Type	Transfer window	Ends	Transfer fee	Source
99	MF	(Romania)	Enes Sali	17	FCV Farul Constanța (Romania)	Transfer	Pre-season		Four-year contract with a one-year club option as part of the MLS U-22 Initiative	
80	MF	(United States)	Alejandro Urzua	17	North Texas SC (United States)	Transfer	Pre-season		Two-year contract with club options for the 2026, 2027 and 2028 seasons	
35	MF	(United States)	Tomas Pondeca	22	North Texas SC (United States)	Transfer	Pre-season		Two-year contract with club options for the 2027 and 2028 seasons	
99	FW	(United States)	Malik Henry-Scott	22	University of Tulsa (United States)	Transfer	Pre-season		One-year contract through the 2024 season with club options for the 2025, 2026 and 2027 seasons	
3	DF	(United States)	Omar Gonzalez	35	New England Revolution (United States)	Transfer	Pre-season		One-year contract through the 2024 season with club options for the 2025	
6	MF	(Ecuador)	Patrickson Delgado	20	Independiente del Valle (Ecuador)	Loan	Pre-season		On one-year loan with an option for a permanent transfer	
9	FW	(Croatia)	Petar Musa	25	Benfica (Portugal)	Transfer	Pre-season		Four-year Designated Player contract with an option for the 2028 season. Dallas acquired Musa’s Discovery Priority from the New England Revolution in exchange for $100,000 in 2024 General Allocation Money	
12	MF	(Haiti)	Carl Sainté	21	North Texas SC (United States)	Transfer	Mid-season		Two-year contract with club options for the 2026 and 2027 seasons	
21	MF	(Angola)	Manuel Cafumana	25	Maccabi Haifa (Israel)	Loan	Mid-season		On one-year loan with an option for a permanent transfer	
5	DF	(Brazil)	Ruan	29	CF Montréal (Canada)	Transfer	Mid-season		Acquired in exchange of $50,000 in General Allocation Money	

==== Draft picks ====
Round	Selection	Pos.	Name	College	Signed	Source
1	3	FW	(United States) Logan Farrington	Oregon State	Signed	
2	44	DF	(United States) Turner Humphrey	Oregon State	Signed with North Texas SC	
3	73	DF	(Denmark) Mads Westergren	SMU	Signed with North Texas SC	

=== Out ===
No.	Pos.	Nat.	Name	Age	Moving to	Type	Transfer window	Transfer fee	Source
3	DF	(Spain)	José Martínez	30	Córdoba CF (Spain)	Option Declined	Pre-season	Free	
5	MF	(Argentina)	Facundo Quignón	30	Belgrano (Argentina)	Option Declined	Pre-season	Free	
23	DF	(United States)	Collin Smith	20	New England Revolution II (United States)	Option Declined	Pre-season	Free	
8	FW	(Colombia)	Jáder Obrian	28	Austin FC (United States)	Option Declined	Pre-season	Free	
9	FW	(Spain)	Jesús Jiménez	30	OFI Crete (Greece)	Transfer	Pre-season	Free	
21	FW	(Colombia)	José Mulato	21	Spartak Subotica (Serbia)	Transfer	Mid-season	Free	

== Club ==
=== Roster ===
As of August 12, 2024. Note: Flags indicate national team as defined under FIFA eligibility rules; some limited exceptions apply. Players may hold more than one non-FIFA nationality.

No.	Pos.	Nation	Player
1	GK	USA	Jimmy Maurer
2	DF	BRA	Geovane Jesus
3	DF	USA	Omar Gonzalez
4	DF	USA	Marco Farfan
5	DF	BRA	Ruan
6	MF	ECU	Patrickson Delgado (on loan from Independiente del Valle)
7	FW	USA	Paul Arriola
8	MF	USA	Sebastian Lletget
9	FW	CRO	Petar Musa (DP)
10	FW	USA	Jesús Ferreira (HG, DP)
11	FW	USA	Dante Sealy (HG)
12	MF	HAI	Carl Sainté
13	GK	USA	Antonio Carrera (HG)
14	MF	ESP	Asier Illarramendi
15	DF	USA	Isaiah Parker (GA)
16	FW	RSA	Tsiki Ntsabeleng
17	DF	USA	Nkosi Tafari
18	MF	CAN	Liam Fraser

No.	Pos.	Nation	Player
19	MF	USA	Paxton Pomykal (HG)
20	FW	ARG	Alan Velasco (DP)
21	MF	ANG	Show (on loan from Maccabi Haifa)
22	DF	GHA	Ema Twumasi (GA)
23	FW	USA	Logan Farrington
24	DF	ALB	Amet Korça
25	DF	USA	Sebastien Ibeagha
27	FW	USA	Herbert Endeley
29	DF	USA	Sam Junqua
30	GK	IDN	Maarten Paes
31	FW	GHA	Eugene Ansah
32	DF	USA	Nolan Norris (HG)
34	MF	USA	Alejandro Urzua (HG)
35	MF	USA	Tomas Pondeca
36	FW	USA	Malik Henry-Scott (HG)
41	FW	JAM	Tarik Scott (HG)
77	FW	USA	Bernard Kamungo
99	MF	ROU	Enes Sali

=== Out on loan ===
Note: Flags indicate national team as defined under FIFA eligibility rules; some limited exceptions apply. Players may hold more than one non-FIFA nationality.

No.	Pos.	Nation	Player

== Competitions ==
=== Preseason ===
January 22, 2024 Friendly	FC Dallas	1–0	Inter Miami CF	Dallas, Texas
5:00PM CST (UTC-06)	Ferreira 3'	Report		Stadium: Cotton Bowl; Attendance: 32,211

January 27, 2024 Friendly	FC Dallas	4–1	New Mexico United	Frisco, Texas
1:00PM CST (UTC-06)	Endeley 25'; Ansah 71' (Ntsabeleng); Fraser 73' (Ansah); Arriola 74' (Ansah)		Bailey 30'	Stadium: Toyota Stadium

February 2, 2024 International Friendly	Odense Boldklub	0–0	FC Dallas	Marbella, Spain
9:00AM CST (UTC-06)				Stadium: La Quinta Football Center

February 5, 2024 International Friendly	Aalborg BK	1–3	FC Dallas	Marbella, Spain
9:00AM CST (UTC-06)	Kramer 13'	Report	Sealy 48', 69'; Farrington 87'	Stadium: La Quinta Football Center

February 8, 2024 International Friendly	FC Dallas	1–4	Malmö FF	Marbella, Spain
4:00AM CST (UTC-06)	Endeley 60'	Report	Diagne 9'; Jørgensen 13'; Kiese Thelin 55', 74'	Stadium: Marbella Football Center

February 8, 2024 International Friendly	FC Dallas	4–1	Odds BK	Marbella, Spain
7:30AM CST (UTC-06)	Kamungo 12'; Sealy 47', 65'; Farrington 59'	Report	Midtskogen 87' (pen.)	Stadium: Marbella Football Center

February 17, 2024 Friendly	FC Dallas	2–0	D.C. United	Frisco, Texas
1:00PM CST (UTC-06)	Endeley 3'; Arriola 90+1'	Report		Stadium: Toyota Stadium

=== MLS ===
==== Western Conference standings ====
Western Conference

MLS Western Conference table (2024)
Pos	Team	Pld	W	L	T	GF	GA	GD	Pts	Qualification
9	Portland Timbers	34	12	11	11	65	56	+9	47	Qualification for the wild-card round and the 2025 Leagues Cup
10	Austin FC	34	11	14	9	39	48	−9	42	
11	FC Dallas	34	11	15	8	54	56	−2	41	
12	St. Louis City SC	34	8	13	13	50	63	−13	37	
13	Sporting Kansas City	34	8	19	7	51	66	−15	31	

Source: MLS
Rules for classification: 1) points; 2) total wins; 3) total goal differential; 4) total goals scored; 5) fewer disciplinary points; 6) away goal differential; 7) away goals scored; 8) home goals differential; 9) home goals scored; 10) coin toss (2 clubs tied) or drawing of lots (≥3 clubs tied)

==== Overall standings ====
Overall MLS standings table
Pos	Team	Pld	W	L	T	GF	GA	GD	Pts	Qualification
17	CF Montréal	34	11	13	10	48	64	−16	43	
18	Austin FC	34	11	14	9	39	48	−9	42	Qualification for the U.S. Open Cup Round of 32 (Note: As one of the U.S. teams who did not qualify for the 2025 CONCACAF Champions Cup or the 2025 Leagues Cup)
19	FC Dallas	34	11	15	8	54	56	−2	41	Qualification for the U.S. Open Cup Round of 32
20	Atlanta United FC	34	10	14	10	46	49	−3	40	
21	D.C. United	34	10	14	10	52	70	−18	40	Qualification for the U.S. Open Cup Round of 32

Source: MLS
Rules for classification: 1) points; 2) total wins; 3) total goal differential; 4) total goals scored; 5) fewer disciplinary points; 6) away goal differential; 7) away goals scored; 8) home goals differential; 9) home goals scored; 10) coin toss (2 clubs tied) or drawing of lots (≥3 clubs tied)

==== Results summary ====
Overall								Home						Away					
Pld	W	D	L	GF	GA	GD	Pts	W	D	L	GF	GA	GD	W	D	L	GF	GA	GD
34	11	8	15	54	56	−2	41	10	2	5	34	25	+9	1	6	10	20	31	−11

Last updated: October 19, 2024.
Source: Regular Season

==== Results by round ====
Round	1	2	3	4	5	6	7	8	9	10	11	12	13	14	15	16	17	18	19	20	21	22	23	24	25	26	27	28	29	30	31	32	33	34
Ground	H	H	A	H	A	A	H	A	H	A	H	A	H	A	A	A	H	H	A	H	H	A	H	H	A	A	H	A	A	H	H	A	A	H
Result	W	L	L	L	L	D	D	L	W	L	W	D	D	L	L	D	W	W	L	L	W	L	W	W	D	W	L	D	L	W	L	L	D	W

Updated to match(es) played on October 19, 2024. Source: Regular Season
A = Away; H = Home; W = Win; D = Draw; L = Loss; P = Postponed

==== Regular season ====
Kickoff times are in CDT (UTC-05) unless shown otherwise

February 24, 2024 1	FC Dallas	2–1	San Jose Earthquakes	Frisco, Texas
7:30PM CST (UTC-06)	Illarramendi 25'; Sealy 90+4'	Report	Kikanović 6'; Gruezo (yellow card) 21'; Rodrigues (yellow card) 45'	Stadium: Toyota Stadium; Attendance: 19,096; Referee: DeShun Beard

March 2, 2024 2	FC Dallas	1–2	CF Montréal	Frisco, Texas
7:30PM CST (UTC-06)	Sealy (yellow card) 26'; Musa 45+1'; Arriola (yellow card) 66'	Report	Vilsaint 20'; Martínez 60'; Campbell (yellow card) 80'; Choinière (yellow card) 83'	Stadium: Toyota Stadium; Attendance: 19,096; Referee: Kyle Johnston

March 9, 2024 3	New York Red Bulls	2–1	FC Dallas	Harrison, New Jersey
6:30PM CST (UTC-06)	Forsberg 30' (pen.); Morgan 54'; Duncan (yellow card) 58'	Report	Fraser (yellow card) 15'; Lletget (yellow card) 34'; Ferreira 59'	Stadium: Red Bull Arena; Attendance: 19,284; Referee: Amin Hadzic

March 16, 2024 4	FC Dallas	1–3	Vancouver Whitecaps FC	Frisco, Texas
7:30PM CDT (UTC-05)	Lletget 40'	Report	Laborda 25'; White 29'; Gauld (yellow card) 32'; Picault 42'	Stadium: Toyota Stadium; Attendance: 19,096; Referee: Jonathan Weiner

March 30, 2024 5 Copa Tejas	Austin FC	2–1	FC Dallas	Austin, Texas
7:30PM CDT (UTC-05)	Wolff (yellow card) 24'; Cascante 54' (yellow card) 88'; Rubio (yellow card) 58' (goal) 70'	Report	Paes (yellow card) 19'; Ansah 51'; Tafari (yellow card) 90+9'	Stadium: Q2 Stadium; Attendance: 20,738; Referee: Rosendo Mendoza

April 6, 2024 6	St. Louis City SC	0–0	FC Dallas	St. Louis, Missouri
7:30PM CDT (UTC-05)	Parker (yellow card) 15'; Durkin (yellow card) 69'; Totland (yellow card) 82'	Report	Fraser (yellow card) 12'	Stadium: CityPark; Attendance: 22,446; Referee: Marcos DeOliveira II

April 13, 2024 7	FC Dallas	0–0	Seattle Sounders FC	Frisco, Texas
7:30PM CDT (UTC-05)	Sealy (yellow card) 45'; Arriola (yellow card) 73'	Report		Stadium: Toyota Stadium; Attendance: 19,096; Referee: Alexis Da Silva

April 20, 2024 8	Colorado Rapids	2–1	FC Dallas	Commerce City, Colorado
8:30PM CDT (UTC-05)	Ibeagha 45' (o.g.); Harris 49'	Report	Ibeagha (yellow card) 27'; Junqua (yellow card) 61'; Musa 87'; Farrington (yellow card) 90+7'	Stadium: Dick's Sporting Goods Park; Attendance: 7,492; Referee: Ricardo Fierro

April 27, 2024 9 Texas Derby	FC Dallas	2–0	Houston Dynamo FC	Frisco, Texas
7:30PM CDT (UTC-05)	Musa (yellow card) 17', (goal) 55'; Illarramendi (yellow card) 42'; Kamungo (yellow card) 73'; Ibeagha 80'	Report	Dorsey (red card) 5'; Micael (yellow card) 62'; Gaines (yellow card) 87'	Stadium: Toyota Stadium; Attendance: 19,096; Referee: Lukasz Szpala

May 4, 2024 10	Toronto FC	3–1	FC Dallas	Toronto, Ontario
6:30PM CDT (UTC-05)	Bernardeschi 45+3', 52'; Gomis (yellow card) 72'; Longstaff 82'; Rosted (yellow card) 90+6'	Report	Musa (yellow card) 9'; Twumasi (yellow card) 67'; Junqua 87'	Stadium: BMO Field; Attendance: 24,257; Referee: Pierre-Luc Lauziere

May 11, 2024 11 Copa Tejas	FC Dallas	2–1	Austin FC	Frisco, Texas
7:30PM CDT (UTC-05)	Musa 4'; Illarramendi (yellow card) 8'; Fraser (yellow card) 43'; Ntsabeleng (yellow card) 48'; Ferreira 56'	Report	Pereira (yellow card) 15'; Driussi 84' (pen.)	Stadium: Toyota Stadium; Attendance: 19,096; Referee: Jair Marrufo

May 18, 2024 12 Texas Derby	Houston Dynamo FC	1–1	FC Dallas	Houston, Texas
7:30PM CDT (UTC-05)	Bassi 45+6'; Kowalczyk (yellow card) 54'; Segal (yellow card) 90+3'	Report	Norris (yellow card) 57'; Musa 69'	Stadium: Shell Energy Stadium; Attendance: 19,284; Referee: Tori Penso

May 25, 2024 13	FC Dallas	3–3	Real Salt Lake	Frisco, Texas
7:30PM CDT (UTC-05)	Fraser (yellow card) 38'; Illarramendi 45+4'; Delgado 57'; Arriola 59'; Paes (yellow card) 80'; Norris (yellow card) 81'; Ibeagha (yellow card) 87'	Report	Luna 61'; Julio 73'; Palacio 90+8'	Stadium: Toyota Stadium; Attendance: 19,096; Referee: Abdou Ndiaye

May 29, 2024 14	LA Galaxy	3–1	FC Dallas	Carson, California
9:30PM CDT (UTC-05)	Joveljic 4', 66' (pen.); Yoshida (yellow card) 89'; Puig 90+4'	Report	Delgado (yellow card) 19', (goal) 22'; Tafari (yellow card) 34' (yellow-red card) 82'; Arriola (yellow card) 35'; Farfan (yellow card) 45+4'	Stadium: Dignity Health Sports Park; Attendance: 19,505; Referee: Filip Dujic

June 1, 2024 15	Los Angeles FC	1–0	FC Dallas	Los Angeles, California
9:30PM CDT (UTC-05)	Chanot (yellow card) 37'; Bouanga 74'	Report	Delgado (yellow card) 44'; Musa (yellow card) 45+2'; Ibeagha (yellow card) 66'; Arriola (yellow card) 79'	Stadium: BMO Stadium; Attendance: 22,105; Referee: Lukasz Szpala

June 8, 2024 16	Minnesota United FC	1–1	FC Dallas	Saint Paul, Minnesota
7:30PM CDT (UTC-05)	Dotson 9'; Fragapane (yellow card) 43'; Trapp (yellow card) 45+2'	Report	Fraser 15'	Stadium: Allianz Field; Attendance: 19,759; Referee: Marcos DeOliveira II

June 15, 2024 17	FC Dallas	2–0	St. Louis City SC	Frisco, Texas
7:30PM CDT (UTC-05)	Ferreira 28'; Illarramendi (yellow card) 45+11'; Ibeagha (yellow card) 65'; Tafari 81'	Report	Nilsson (yellow card) 26'; Parker (yellow card) 34'; Löwen (yellow card) 68'; Þórisson (yellow card) 75'	Stadium: Toyota Stadium; Attendance: 19,096; Referee: Jon Freemon

June 19, 2024 18	FC Dallas	5–3	Minnesota United FC	Frisco, Texas
7:30PM CDT (UTC-05)	Musa 17', 38', 62'; Illarramendi (yellow card) 52'; Ferreira 75'; Farrington 90' (yellow card) 90+8'	Report	Hlongwane 32'; Dotson 57'; Boxall (yellow card) 68'; Trapp 90+9'	Stadium: Toyota Stadium; Attendance: 19,096; Referee: Sergii Demianchuk

June 22, 2024 19	Seattle Sounders FC	3–2	FC Dallas	Seattle, Washington
9:30PM CDT (UTC-05)	Ruidíaz 78'; Vargas (yellow card) 80'; Morris 88', 90+4'	Report	Musa (yellow card) 27', (goal) 70'; Delgado 66'; Sealy (yellow card) 89'	Stadium: Lumen Field; Attendance: 30,093; Referee: Malik Badawi

June 29, 2024 20	FC Dallas	0–1	FC Cincinnati	Frisco, Texas
7:30PM CDT (UTC-05)	Norris (yellow card) 58'; Scott (yellow card) 82'	Report	Kubo (yellow card) 17'; Orellano 47'; Powell (yellow card) 56'; Yedlin (yellow card) 61'; Kelsy (yellow card) 65'; Celentano (yellow card) 88'; Acosta (yellow card) 90+4'	Stadium: Toyota Stadium; Attendance: 19,096; Referee: Victor Rivas

July 4, 2024 21	FC Dallas	3–2	Portland Timbers	Frisco, Texas
7:30PM CDT (UTC-05)	Illarramendi (yellow card) 22'; Musa 49'; Tafari 61'; Paredes 87' (o.g.); Kamungo (yellow card) 90'; Twumasi (yellow card) 90+4'; Ibeagha (yellow card) 90+9'	Report	Antony 8'; Evander 63', (yellow card) 90+9'	Stadium: Toyota Stadium; Attendance: 19,096; Referee: Rosendo Mendoza

July 7, 2024 22	Sporting Kansas City	3–2	FC Dallas	Kansas City, Kansas
7:30PM CDT (UTC-05)	Agada 11', 23'; Castellanos (yellow card) 15'; Rodríguez 82'; Bassong (yellow card) 85' (red card) 90+4'	Report	Melia 30' (o.g.); Musa 65'; Arriola (yellow card) 90+5'	Stadium: Children's Mercy Park; Attendance: 17,457; Referee: Natalie Simon

July 13, 2024 23	FC Dallas	2–0	LA Galaxy	Frisco, Texas
7:30PM CDT (UTC-05)	Musa 28'; Farrington 55'	Report		Stadium: Toyota Stadium; Attendance: 19,096; Referee: Ramy Touchan

July 17, 2024 24 Copa Tejas	FC Dallas	3–1	Austin FC	Frisco, Texas
7:30PM CDT (UTC-05)	Arriola 10'; Farrington (yellow card) 55'; Musa 56', (yellow card) 56'; Twumasi (yellow card) 63'; Farfan 74'; Paes (yellow card) 90+1'	Report	Zardes 16'; Cascante (yellow card) 55'; Driussi (red card) 60'; Pereira (yellow card) 90+8'	Stadium: Toyota Stadium; Referee: Armando Villarreal

July 20, 2024 25	New England Revolution	1–1	FC Dallas	Foxborough, Massachusetts
6:30PM CDT (UTC-05)	Polster (yellow card) 20'; Arreaga (yellow card) 30'; Tafari 65' (o.g.); Wood (yellow card) 70'; Ivačič (yellow card) 90'; Kessler (yellow card) 90+4'	Report	Ibeagha (yellow card) 36'; Tafari (yellow card) 49'; Arriola 90+5'	Stadium: Gillette Stadium; Attendance: 28,260; Referee: Pierre-Luc Lauziere

August 24, 2024 26	D.C. United	3–4	FC Dallas	Washington, D.C.
6:30PM CDT (UTC-05)	Benteke 2' (yellow card) 90+1'; Klick (yellow card) 25'; Enow (yellow card) 34' (yellow-red card) 45+2'; Schnegg 42' (yellow card) 90+3'; Stroud (yellow card) 43' (goal) 48'; Herrera (yellow card) 66'; Rodríguez (yellow card) 80'	Report	Tafari 9'; Lletget 21'; Arriola 40' (yellow card) 54'; Ntsabeleng 44'; Farfan (yellow card) 46'; Illarramendi (yellow card) 83'	Stadium: Audi Field; Attendance: 17,766; Referee: Sergii Boiko

August 31, 2024 27	FC Dallas	2–3	Colorado Rapids	Frisco, Texas
7:30PM CDT (UTC-05)	Farrington 6'; Ntsabeleng (yellow card) 33'; Junqua (yellow card) 65'; Musa 66'; Velasco (yellow card) 90+5'; Ruan (yellow card) 90+8'	Report	Navarro 11', 76' (yellow card) 62'; Yapi (yellow card) 89' (goal) 90+3'; Edwards (yellow card) 90+10'	Stadium: Toyota Stadium; Attendance: 19,096; Referee: Ricardo Montero

September 7, 2024 28	Vancouver Whitecaps FC	0–0	FC Dallas	Vancouver, British Columbia
9:30PM CDT (UTC-05)	Fleuriau Chateau (yellow card) 83'	Report	Farfan (yellow card) 87'	Stadium: BC Place; Attendance: 23,188; Referee: Allen Chapman

September 18, 2024 29	Real Salt Lake	3–2	FC Dallas	Sandy, Utah
8:30PM CDT (UTC-05)	Vera 11' (pen.); Julio 24', 62'; Crooks (yellow card) 90'; Eneli (yellow card) 90+10'	Report	Ferreira 45+1'; Velasco 88' (pen.)	Stadium: America First Field; Attendance: 19,436; Referee: Sergii Demianchuk

September 21, 2024 30	FC Dallas	3–1	Los Angeles FC	Frisco, Texas
7:30PM CDT (UTC-05)	Velasco (yellow card) 20'; Musa 28'; Gonzalez (yellow card) 50'; Delgado 60'; Farrington 62'; Illarramendi (yellow card) 85'	Report	Segura (yellow card) 57'; Atuesta 86'; Long (yellow card) 90+3'	Stadium: Toyota Stadium; Attendance: 19,096; Referee: Alexis Da Silva

September 28, 2024 31	FC Dallas	1–3	Orlando City SC	Frisco, Texas
7:30PM CDT (UTC-05)	Arriola 78' (pen.); Farrington (yellow card) 90+2'	Report	Enrique 18'; Schlegel 51'; Torres 55'; Araújo (yellow card) 67'; Gallese (yellow card) 86'; McGuire (yellow card) 90+4'	Stadium: Toyota Stadium; Attendance: 19,096; Referee: Jair Marrufo

October 2, 2024 32	San Jose Earthquakes	3–2	FC Dallas	San Jose, California
9:30PM CDT (UTC-05)	López 13', 79'; Marie (yellow card) 37'; Gruezo (yellow card) 73'; Ebobisse 83'	Report	Tafari (yellow card) 15'; Velasco 41', (yellow card) 55'; Ibeagha (yellow card) 60', (goal) 90'; Arriola (yellow card) 74'	Stadium: PayPal Park; Attendance: 13,414; Referee: Lorenzo Hernandez

October 6, 2024 33	Portland Timbers	0–0	FC Dallas	Portland, Oregon
6:00PM CDT (UTC-05)	Miller (yellow card) 5'; Mosquera (yellow card) 84'	Report	Illarramendi (yellow card) 25'; Ntsabeleng (yellow card) 56'; Farfan (yellow card) 81'	Stadium: Providence Park; Referee: Armando Villarreal

October 19, 2024 34	FC Dallas	2–1	Sporting Kansas City	Frisco, Texas
8:00PM CDT (UTC-05)	Musa 16', (yellow card) 55'; Fernández 40' (o.g.)	Report	Leibold (yellow card) 28'; Agada 89'	Stadium: Toyota Stadium; Attendance: 19,096; Referee: Katja Koroleva

=== U.S. Open Cup ===
May 7, 2024 Round of 32	FC Dallas (Texas)	1–0	(Tennessee) Memphis 901 FC	Frisco, Texas
7:30 PM CDT (UTC-5)	Illarramendi (yellow card) 41'; Delgado (yellow card) 43'; Farrington 73'; Farfan (yellow card) 88'	Report	Ward (yellow card) 59'; Careaga (yellow card) 88'	Stadium: Toyota Stadium; Attendance: 4,511; Referee: Eduardo Jeff

May 22, 2024 Round of 16	Tampa Bay Rowdies (Florida)	1–2	(Texas) FC Dallas	St. Petersburg, Florida
6:30 PM CDT (UTC-5)	Pérez 85' (pen.)	Report	Ibeagha (yellow card) 3'; Delgado 15' (yellow card) 20'; Farrington 26'; Ntsabeleng (yellow card) 52'; Farfan (yellow card) 90+1'	Stadium: Al Lang Stadium; Referee: Guido Gonzalez

July 10, 2024 Quarterfinals	Sporting Kansas City	2–1 (a.e.t.)	(Texas) FC Dallas	Kansas City, Kansas
8:00 PM CDT (UTC-5)	Agada 77'; Rodríguez (yellow card) 92'; Davis (yellow card) 99'; Rosero 111', (yellow card) 113'	Report	Tafari (yellow card) 68'; Illarramendi (yellow card) 79'; Musa 86'	Stadium: Children's Mercy Park
Note: Match delayed two hours due to lightning strikes in the area

=== Leagues Cup ===
==== West 3 ====
Pos	Team	Pld	W	PW	PL	L	GF	GA	GD	Pts	Qualification	JUA	STL	DAL
1	(Mexican Football Federation) Juárez	2	1	1	0	0	3	1	+2	5	Advance to knockout stage	—	—	—
2	(United States Soccer Federation) St. Louis City SC	2	1	0	1	0	3	2	+1	4	Advance to knockout stage	1–1	—	2–1
3	(United States Soccer Federation) FC Dallas	2	0	0	0	2	1	4	−3	0		0–1	—	—

Source: Leagues Cup
Rules for classification: Tiebreakers

July 27, 2024 Group stage	St. Louis City SC (United States)	2–1	(United States) FC Dallas	St. Louis, Missouri
8:00PM CDT (UTC-05)	Teuchert 27'; Hartel 49' (pen.); Reid (yellow card) 54'; Hiebert (yellow card) 65'; Parker (yellow card) 66'	Report	Junqua 18'; Ntsabeleng (yellow card) 21'; Ibeagha (yellow card) 64'	Stadium: CityPark; Attendance: 17,584; Referee: Ekaterina Koroleva

July 31, 2024 Group stage	FC Dallas (United States)	0–2	(Mexico) FC Juárez	Frisco, Texas
8:00PM CDT (UTC-05)	Sainté (yellow card) 2'; Lletget (yellow card) 41'	Report	Zaldívar 23'; Calvo (yellow card) 29'; González (yellow card) 35'; Hurtado 83' (pen.); Ortega (yellow card) 90'	Stadium: Toyota Stadium; Attendance: 13,367; Referee: Melissa Borjas

== Statistics ==
=== Appearances ===
Numbers outside parentheses denote appearances as starter.
Numbers in parentheses denote appearances as substitute.
Players with no appearances are not included in the list.

As of final match played October 19, 2024

No.	Pos.	Nat.	Name	MLS	U.S. Open Cup	Leagues Cup	Total
No.	Pos.	Nat.	Name	Apps	Apps	Apps	Apps
1	GK	USA	Jimmy Maurer	4	0	0	4
3	DF	USA	Omar Gonzalez	10(5)	(1)	1	11(6)
4	DF	USA	Marco Farfan	23(3)	3	2	28(3)
5	DF	BRA	Ruan	5(1)	0	0	5(1)
6	MF	ECU	Patrickson Delgado	14(9)	2	0	16(9)
7	FW	USA	Paul Arriola	28(3)	1	2	31(3)
8	MF	USA	Sebastian Lletget	20(11)	1(1)	1	22(12)
9	FW	CRO	Petar Musa	27(3)	2	2	31(3)
10	FW	USA	Jesús Ferreira	14(8)	2	0	16(8)
11	FW	USA	Dante Sealy	9(8)	(1)	0	9(9)
12	MF	HAI	Carl Sainté	1(5)	(2)	2	3(7)
14	MF	ESP	Asier Illarramendi	22(3)	2(1)	0	24(4)
16	MF	RSA	Tsiki Ntsabeleng	11(14)	3	2	16(14)
17	DF	USA	Nkosi Tafari	25(3)	3	1(1)	29(4)
18	MF	CAN	Liam Fraser	17(1)	(1)	0	17(2)
19	MF	USA	Paxton Pomykal	(1)	0	0	(1)
20	FW	ARG	Alan Velasco	5(3)	0	0	5(3)
21	MF	ANG	Show	6(1)	0	0	6(1)
22	DF	GHA	Ema Twumasi	13(6)	0	1	14(6)
23	FW	USA	Logan Farrington	10(19)	2(1)	2	14(20)
25	DF	USA	Sebastien Ibeagha	31	3	2	36
27	FW	USA	Herbert Endeley	1(3)	2(1)	0	3(4)
29	DF	USA	Sam Junqua	26(5)	2(1)	2	30(6)
30	GK	IDN	Maarten Paes	30	3	2	35
31	FW	GHA	Eugene Ansah	5(12)	(1)	(2)	5(15)
32	DF	USA	Nolan Norris	2(2)	0	0	2(2)
35	MF	USA	Tomas Pondeca	2(1)	0	(2)	2(3)
41	FW	JAM	Tarik Scott	(2)	0	(1)	(3)
51	MF	USA	Anthony Ramirez	(1)	0	0	(1)
77	FW	TAN	Bernard Kamungo	13(16)	2(1)	(2)	15(19)

=== Goals and assists ===
As of final match played October 19, 2024

No.	Pos.	Name	MLS		U.S. Open Cup		Leagues Cup		Total	
No.	Pos.	Name	Goals	Assists	Goals	Assists	Goals	Assists	Goals	Assists
4	DF	(United States) Marco Farfan	1	1	0	0	0	0	1	1
5	DF	(Brazil) Ruan	0	1	0	0	0	0	0	1
6	MF	(Ecuador) Patrickson Delgado	4	3	1	0	0	0	5	3
7	FW	(United States) Paul Arriola	5	5	0	0	0	1	5	6
8	MF	(United States) Sebastian Lletget	2	8	0	1	0	0	2	9
9	FW	(Croatia) Petar Musa	16	3	1	0	0	0	17	3
10	FW	(United States) Jesús Ferreira	5	5	0	2	0	0	5	7
11	FW	(United States) Dante Sealy	1	0	0	0	0	0	1	0
14	MF	(Spain) Asier Illarramendi	2	5	0	1	0	0	2	6
16	FW	(South Africa) Tsiki Ntsabeleng	1	3	0	0	0	0	1	3
17	DF	(United States) Nkosi Tafari	3	0	0	0	0	0	3	0
18	MF	(Canada) Liam Fraser	1	1	0	0	0	0	1	1
20	FW	(Argentina) Alan Velasco	2	2	0	0	0	0	2	2
22	DF	(Ghana) Ema Twumasi	0	1	0	0	0	0	0	1
23	FW	(United States) Logan Farrington	4	8	2	0	0	0	6	8
25	DF	(United States) Sebastien Ibeagha	2	0	0	0	0	0	2	0
27	FW	(United States) Herbert Endeley	0	0	0	1	0	0	0	1
29	DF	(United States) Sam Junqua	1	3	0	0	1	0	2	3
31	FW	(Ghana) Eugene Ansah	1	1	0	0	0	0	1	1
77	FW	(United States) Bernard Kamungo	0	4	0	0	0	0	0	4
			3	0	0	0	0	0	3	0
Total			54	54	4	5	1	1	59	60

=== Disciplinary record ===
As of match played October 19, 2024

No.	Pos.	Name	MLS		U.S. Open Cup		Leagues Cup		Total	
No.	Pos.	Name	Booked	Sent off (straight red)	Booked	Sent off (straight red)	Booked	Sent off (straight red)	Booked	Sent off (straight red)
3	DF	(United States) Omar Gonzalez	1	0	0	0	0	0	1	0
4	DF	(United States) Marco Farfan	4	0	2	0	0	0	6	0
5	DF	(Brazil) Ruan	1	0	0	0	0	0	1	0
6	MF	(Ecuador) Patrickson Delgado	2	0	2	0	0	0	4	0
7	FW	(United States) Paul Arriola	7	0	0	0	0	0	7	0
8	MF	(United States) Sebastian Lletget	1	0	0	0	1	0	2	0
9	FW	(Croatia) Petar Musa	6	0	0	0	0	0	6	0
11	FW	(United States) Dante Sealy	3	0	0	0	0	0	3	0
12	MF	(Haiti) Carl Sainte	0	0	0	0	1	0	1	0
14	MF	(Spain) Asier Illarramendi	8	0	2	0	0	0	10	0
16	MF	(South Africa) Tsiki Ntsabeleng	3	0	1	0	1	0	5	0
17	DF	(United States) Nkosi Tafari	5	0	1	0	0	0	6	0
18	MF	(Canada) Liam Fraser	4	0	0	0	0	0	4	0
20	FW	(Argentina) Alan Velasco	3	0	0	0	0	0	3	0
22	DF	(Ghana) Ema Twumasi	3	0	0	0	0	0	3	0
23	DF	(United States) Logan Farrington	4	0	0	0	0	0	4	0
25	DF	(United States) Sebastien Ibeagha	7	0	1	0	1	0	9	0
29	DF	(United States) Sam Junqua	2	0	0	0	0	0	2	0
30	GK	(Indonesia) Maarten Paes	2	0	0	0	0	0	2	0
32	DF	(United States) Nolan Norris	3	0	0	0	0	0	3	0
41	FW	(Jamaica) Tarik Scott	1	0	0	0	0	0	1	0
77	FW	(United States) Bernard Kamungo	2	0	0	0	0	0	2	0
Total			72	0	9	0	4	0	85	0

=== Goalkeeper stats ===
As of final match played October 19, 2024

No.	Name	Total				Major League Soccer				U.S. Open Cup				Leagues Cup			
No.	Name	MIN	GA	GAA	SV	MIN	GA	GAA	SV	MIN	GA	GAA	SV	MIN	GA	GAA	SV
30	(Indonesia) Maarten Paes	3180	58	1.64	142	2700	51	1.7	117	300	3	0.9	12	180	4	2	13
1	(United States) Jimmy Maurer	360	4	1	20	360	4	1	20	0	0	0	0	0	0	0	0
	TOTALS	3540	62	1.58	162	3060	55	1.62	137	300	3	0.9	12	180	4	2	13

== Kits ==
Primary	Secondary	Secondary Alt.	Secondary Alt. 2

Type	Shirt	Shorts	Socks	First appearance / Info
Primary	Red / Blue	Blue / White stripes	Blue / White Stripes	MLS, February 24, 2024 against San Jose Earthquakes
Secondary	White / Green flames	White / Black stripes	White / Red/Black hoops	MLS, March 9, 2024 against New York Red Bulls
Secondary Alternate	White / Green flames	Black / White stripes	White / Red/Black hoops	MLS, March 2, 2024 against CF Montréal
Secondary Alternate 2	White / Green flames	Black / White stripes	Black / Red/White hoops	MLS, March 16, 2024 against Vancouver Whitecaps FC
