= Logan Farrington =

American soccer player (born 2001)

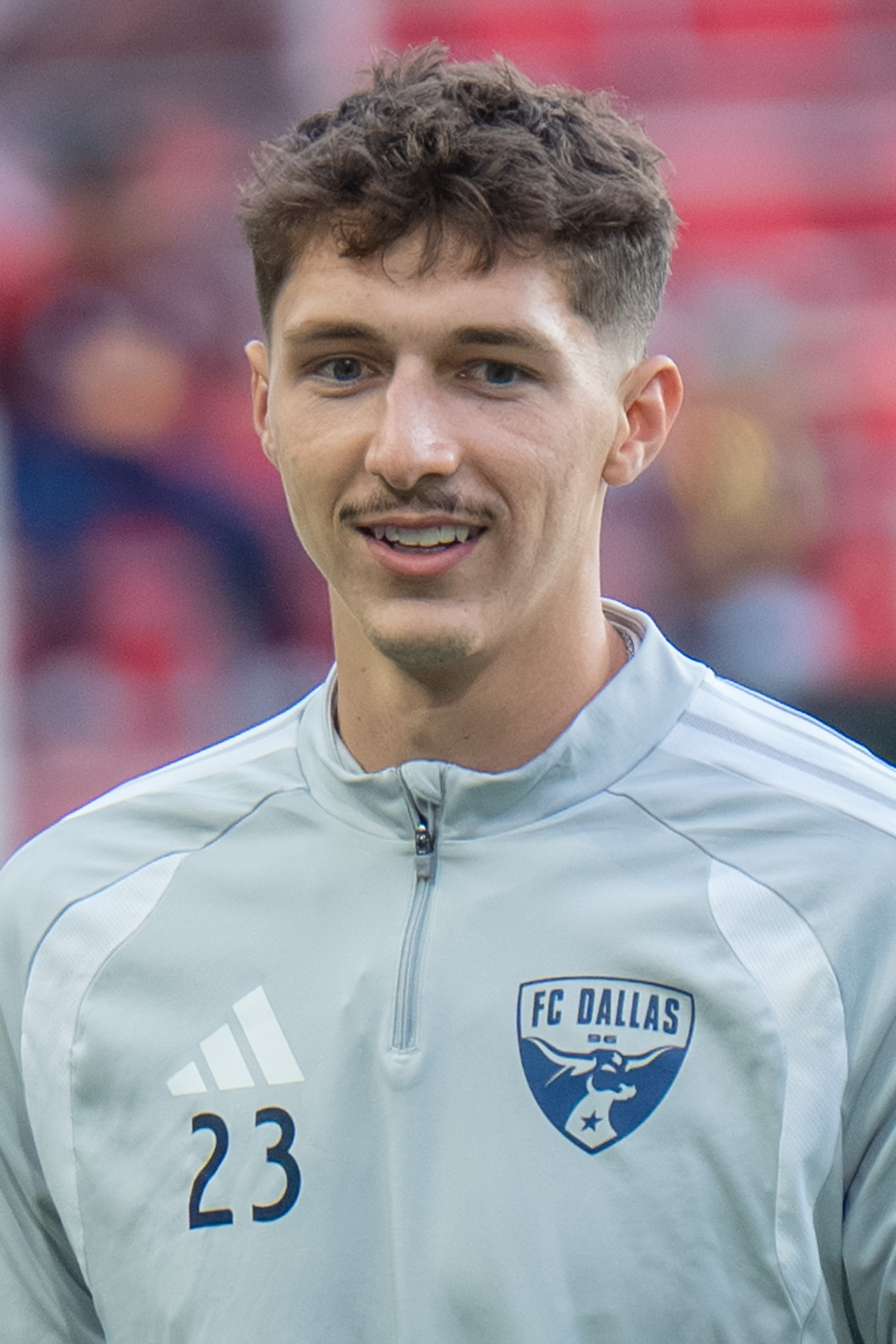
- Farrington with FC Dallas in 2026

Personal information
- Date of birth: December 14, 2001 (age 24)
- Place of birth: Racine, Wisconsin, U.S.
- Height: 6 ft 2 in (1.88 m)
- Position: Forward

Team information
- Current team: FC Dallas
- Number: 23

Youth career
- Bavarian United SC

College career
Years	Team	Apps	(Gls)
2020–2022	Milwaukee Panthers	47	(20)
2023	Oregon State Beavers	21	(15)

Senior career*
Years	Team	Apps	(Gls)
2022–2023	Ventura County Fusion	23	(21)
2024–	FC Dallas	75	(16)
2024	→ North Texas SC (loan)	1	(0)
- * Club domestic league appearances and goals as of August 10, 2025

Logan Farrington (born December 14, 2001) is an American soccer player who plays as a forward for FC Dallas in Major League Soccer.

== Early life ==
Farrington played youth soccer with the Croatian Eagles and Milwaukee Bavarians, helping the latter team win a Wisconsin State Club Championship.

He attended high school at the Union Grove Union High School. He finished as the school's all-time leader in goals (113), assists (49), points (275), single-season goals (43), and single-season points (100), earning three straight All-Southern Lakes Conference and All-County honors in addition to being named to the All-State team. He was also named the Racine County Player of the Year in 2018.

== College career ==
In 2020, he committed to attend the University of Wisconsin–Milwaukee, where he played for the men's soccer team. He made his collegiate debut on February 4, 2021, scoring a brace in a victory over the Purdue Fort Wayne Mastodons. He was named the Horizon League Player Of The Week for the first time in March 2021.

At the end of the season, he was named the Horizon League Freshman of the Year and was selected to the selected to the All-Horizon League First Team, Horizone League All-Freshmen Team, Horizon League All-Tournament Team, and the All-North Region Second Team. In his sophomore season, he was once again named to the All-Horizon League First Team.

At the end of his junior season, he was named to the All-Horizon League First Team, All-North Region Third Team, Academic All-District Soccer Team, and was a Horizon League All-Academic Team Honorable Mention. Over his three seasons with the school, he scored 20 goals and added 14 assists.

In 2023, he transferred to Oregon State University to play for the men's soccer team. On August 27, 2023, he scored his first goal for the team against the UC Riverside Highlanders. In September, he was named the Pac-12 Conference Player of the Week and College Soccer News National Player of the Week. At the end of the season, he was named the Pac-12 Player of the Year and Pac-12 Offensive Player of the Year and was named to the All-PAc 12 First Team, the All-Region Team, and a First Team All American.

== Club career ==
In 2022, Farrington began playing with the Ventura County Fusion in USL League Two. He won the league championship with the club in 2022 and was named to the All-Western Conference Team.

In 2023, he won the league's Player of the Year award and finished as the joint Golden Boot winner with 13 goals in the regular season. He was also named to the Team of the Year and named the Southwest Division player of the year.

Ahead of the 2024 MLS SuperDraft, he signed a Generation Adidas contract with Major League Soccer. He was then selected in the first round (third overall) by FC Dallas. On February 25, 2024, he made his professional debut, playing the full 90 in the season opener, against the San Jose Earthquakes.

On May 7, 2024, he scored his first professional goal in a 1-0 victory in a 2024 US Open Cup match against Memphis 901 FC. In January 2025, he signed an extension through 2027, with options for 2028 and 2029.

== Career statistics ==
As of March 21, 2026

Club	Season	League			Playoffs		National cup		Other		Total	
Club	Season	Division	Apps	Goals	Apps	Goals	Apps	Goals	Apps	Goals	Apps	Goals
Ventura County Fusion	2022	USL League Two	11	8	5	1	—		—		16	9
Ventura County Fusion	2023	USL League Two	12	13	3	4	0	0	—		15	17
Ventura County Fusion	Total		23	21	8	5	0	0	0	0	31	26
FC Dallas	2024	Major League Soccer	29	4	0	0	3	2	2	0	34	6
FC Dallas	2025	Major League Soccer	24	4	0	0	2	0	0	0	26	4
FC Dallas	2026	Major League Soccer	21	7	0	0	0	0	0	0	21	7
FC Dallas	Total		74	15	0	0	5	2	2	0	81	17
North Texas SC (loan)	2024	MLS Next Pro	1	0	4	2	—		—		5	2
Career total			98	32	12	7	5	2	2	0	103	41

== Honors ==
Ventura County Fusion

- USL League Two: 2022
