= Malik Henry-Scott =

American soccer player (born 2001)

Personal information
- Date of birth: November 28, 2001 (age 24)
- Place of birth: Plano, Texas, United States
- Height: 5 ft 10 in (1.78 m)
- Position: Forward

Team information
- Current team: Indy Eleven on loan from Lexington SC
- Number: 15

Youth career
- 2011–2020: FC Dallas

College career
Years	Team	Apps	(Gls)
2020–2023	Tulsa Golden Hurricane	48	(17)

Senior career*
Years	Team	Apps	(Gls)
2023	Texas United	8	(8)
2024	FC Dallas	0	(0)
2024	→ North Texas SC (loan)	21	(3)
2025–	Lexington SC	11	(1)
2025	→ Huntsville City FC (loan)	6	(0)
2026–	→ Indy Eleven (loan)	10	(1)
- * Club domestic league appearances and goals as of November 6, 2026

Malik Henry-Scott (born November 28, 2001) is an American soccer player who plays for USL Championship club Indy Eleven on loan from Lexington SC.

== Early life ==
Henry-Scott joined the FC Dallas academy at age nine.

== College career ==
In 2020, Henry-Scott began attending the University of Tulsa, where he played for the men's soccer team. At the end of his first season, he was named to the American Athletic Conference All-Freshman Team. On September 3, 2021, he scored his first collegiate goal in a victory over the Missouri State Bears. Later that week, he was named the American Athletic Conference Offensive Player of the Week, and was named to the College Soccer News and Top Drawer Soccer National Teams of the Week on two occasions. At the end of his sophomore season, he was named to the All-AAC Second Team. He was also named to the AAC All-Academic Team three times and the Academic All-District first team as a junior.

== Club career ==
In 2023, Henry-Scott played with Texas United in USL League Two.

In December 2023, Henry-Scott signed a homegrown player contract for the 2024 season, with club options for the 2025, 2026 and 2027 seasons with FC Dallas. He spent the 2024 season playing with the club's second team, North Texas SC, in MLS Next Pro. He made his debut for North Texas SC on March 15, 2024, against Whitecaps FC 2. On July 3, 2024, he scored his first goal for North Texas SC in a 4–0 victory over Minnesota United FC 2. At the end of the season, FC Dallas declined his option for 2025.

In January 2025, he signed with Lexington SC of the USL Championship. Ahead of the 2025 season, he was loaned to Huntsville City FC in MLS Next Pro. He made his debut for Huntsville City on March 9 against Chicago Fire FC II.

In August 2026, Indy Eleven announced they had acquired Henry-Scott on loan from Lexington SC for the reminder of the 2026 USL Championship season.

== Personal life ==
Henry-Scott is the older brother of the Jamaican youth international and fellow professional soccer player Tarik Scott.

== Career statistics ==
As of March 4, 2025

Club	Season	League			Playoffs		National Cup		Other		Total	
Club	Season	Division	Apps	Goals	Apps	Goals	Apps	Goals	Apps	Goals	Apps	Goals
Texas United	2023	USL League Two	8	8	0	0	—		—		8	8
FC Dallas	2024	Major League Soccer	0	0	—		0	0	0	0	0	0
North Texas SC (loan)	2024	MLS Next Pro	21	3	2	1	—		—		23	4
Career total			29	11	2	1	0	0	0	0	31	12
