= Michael Collodi =

American soccer player (born 2001)

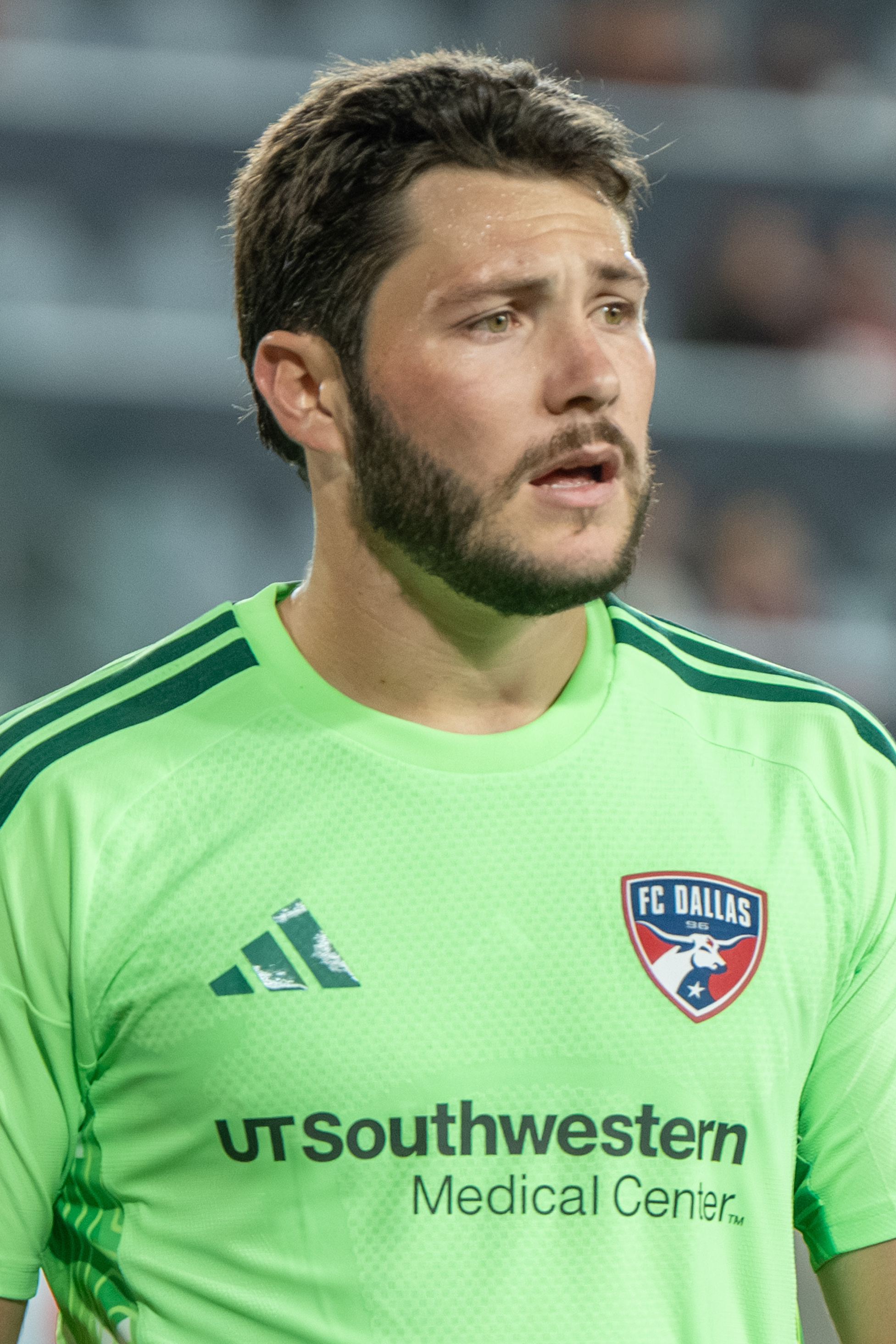
- Collodi with FC Dallas in 2026

Personal information
- Full name: Michael Collodi
- Date of birth: May 25, 2001 (age 25)
- Place of birth: Plano, Texas, U.S.
- Height: 6 ft 0 in (1.83 m)
- Position: Goalkeeper

Team information
- Current team: FC Dallas
- Number: 30

Youth career
- 2015–2019: FC Dallas

College career
Years	Team	Apps	(Gls)
2019–2023	Columbia Lions	58	(0)

Senior career*
Years	Team	Apps	(Gls)
2024	North Texas SC	27	(0)
2025–	FC Dallas	6	(0)
- * Club domestic league appearances and goals as of September 6, 2025

Michael Collodi (born May 25, 2001) is an American professional soccer player who plays as a goalkeeper for Major League Soccer club FC Dallas.

== Early life ==
Collodi was born in Plano, Texas, to Stacey and Mike Collodi. Both of his parents were student-athletes at the Colorado School of Mines.

== Youth and college career ==
Collodi joined the FC Dallas academy in 2015 and remained until 2019, when he committed to playing collegiate soccer at Columbia University. He was an immediate starter as a freshman and ended his college career with 58 appearances, all starts, across four seasons. He was named Honorable Mention All-Ivy League in 2021 and 2022, and Second Team All-Ivy League in 2023. He ranks second all-time in career saves at Columbia with 237.

== Club career ==
In January 2024, after graduating college, Collodi signed with North Texas SC, FC Dallas’ developmental team in MLS Next Pro. In his first professional season, he made 27 appearances, recording 90 saves, five clean sheets, and 17 wins. He was named the 2024 MLS Next Pro Goalkeeper of the Year.

On January 9, 2025, Collodi signed a Homegrown Player contract with FC Dallas. He made his Major League Soccer debut on March 22, 2025, starting in a 1–0 victory over Real Salt Lake while first-choice goalkeeper Maarten Paes was on international duty with Indonesia.

== Honors ==
North Texas SC

- MLS Next Pro Championship: 2024
- MLS Next Pro Regular Season Title: 2024

Individual

- MLS Next Pro Goalkeeper of the Year: 2024
