= Enes Sali =

Romanian footballer

Personal information
- Full name: Enes Sali
- Date of birth: 23 February 2006 (age 20)
- Place of birth: Toronto, Canada
- Height: 1.68 m (5 ft 6 in)
- Positions: Winger; attacking midfielder

Team information
- Current team: Andorra
- Number: 12

Youth career
- 2012–2017: Woodbridge Strikers
- 2017–2018: Barcelona
- 2018–2021: Gheorghe Hagi Academy

Senior career*
Years	Team	Apps	(Gls)
2021–2024	Farul Constanța	50	(4)
2024–2026	FC Dallas	0	(0)
2024	→ North Texas SC (loan)	25	(8)
2025	→ Al-Riyadh (loan)	8	(1)
2025	→ North Texas SC (loan)	1	(0)
2026	→ Al-Riyadh (loan)	13	(0)
2026–	Andorra	0	(0)

International career^{‡}
2021	Romania U16	3	(1)
2021–2023	Romania U17	14	(4)
2022–2023	Romania U19	10	(2)
2021	Romania	1	(0)
- * Club domestic league appearances and goals as of 4 May 2026 ‡ National team caps and goals as of 21 November 2023

Enes Sali (born 23 February 2006) is a professional footballer who plays as a left winger or an attacking midfielder for Segunda División club Andorra. Born in Canada, he represented Romania at international level.

== Early life ==
Born in Toronto, Ontario, Sali played youth football for Woodbridge Strikers until the age of 11. In 2017, he was scouted by Barcelona during an international tournament and moved to the Catalans for two seasons, before they encountered issues with FIFA and had to release him. Former Romanian international Gheorghe Hagi then persuaded Sali's father to move back to Romania with his son, in order for the youngster to join Viitorul Constanța's academy.

== Club career ==
Sali registered his senior debut for the now-renamed Farul Constanța on 9 August 2021, aged 15, in a 1–0 Liga I victory over Sepsi OSK. On 13 September that year, he became the youngest player to score in the Liga I at 15 years, six months and 21 days, after netting the last goal in a 5–0 defeat of Academica Clinceni. On 11 October 2023, he was named by English newspaper The Guardian as one of the best players born in 2006 worldwide.

Sali signed a multi-year contract with American Major League Soccer club FC Dallas on 4 December 2023. He began the season with their second team, North Texas SC, in MLS Next Pro, scoring his first goal in his third appearance on 14 April. He made his FC Dallas debut on 1 August 2024, in a 2024 Leagues Cup match against Mexican side Juárez. In January 2025, he was loaned to Al-Riyadh in the Saudi Pro League through July 2025. On 24 January 2026, he re-joined Al-Riyadh on loan.

On 7 August 2026, Sali moved to Segunda División side FC Andorra on a one-year deal, with an option for a further two seasons, after the club acquired 50% of his economic rights.

== International career ==
Born in Canada to Romanian-Turkish parents, Sali was eligible to represent both Canada, Turkey and Romania at international level.

On 3 November 2021, aged 15, Sali was selected by the Romania national team for the 2022 FIFA World Cup qualifiers against Iceland and Liechtenstein. Romanian newspaper Gazeta Sporturilor later reported that Canada had also approached him for a possible call up. Sali made his senior debut on 14 November by coming on as an 82nd minute substitute for Andrei Ivan in the latter match, and became the youngest European player to appear in a competitive game at 15 years and 264 days (Lucas Knecht holds the record for any player in any match type).

== Personal life ==
Sali's parents met in Constanța, Romania, and are both of Turkish descent. After getting married, they relocated to Canada where his mother's family had been living for several decades. In 2019, Sali's father moved back to Romania with his son.

== Career statistics ==
=== Club ===
As of match played 4 May 2026

Appearances and goals by club, season and competition
Club	Season	League			Playoffs (Note: Includes MLS Next Pro playoffs, MLS Cup playoffs)		National cup (Note: Includes Cupa României)		Continental		Other		Total	
Club	Season	Division	Apps	Goals	Apps	Goals	Apps	Goals	Apps	Goals	Apps	Goals	Apps	Goals
Farul Constanța	2021–22	Liga I	20	1	—		0	0	—		—		20	1
Farul Constanța	2022–23	Liga I	19	2	—		3	0	—		—		22	2
Farul Constanța	2023–24	Liga I	11	1	—		3	0	1 (Note: Appearance in UEFA Champions League)	0	1 (Note: Appearance in Supercupa României)	0	16	1
Farul Constanța	Total		50	4	0	0	6	0	1	0	1	0	58	4
FC Dallas	2024	Major League Soccer	0	0	—		0	0	—		1 (Note: Appearance in Leagues Cup)	0	1	0
FC Dallas	2025	Major League Soccer	0	0	1	0	0	0	—		—		1	0
FC Dallas	Total		0	0	1	0	0	0	—		1	0	2	0
North Texas SC (loan)	2024	MLS Next Pro	25	8	4	1	—		—		—		29	9
Al-Riyadh (loan)	2024–25	Saudi Pro League	8	1	—		—		—		—		8	1
North Texas SC (loan)	2025	MLS Next Pro	1	0	0	0	—		—		—		1	0
Al-Riyadh (loan)	2025–26	Saudi Pro League	13	0	—		—		—		—		13	0
Andorra	2026–27	Segunda División	0	0	—		0	0	—		—		0	0
Career total			97	13	5	0	6	0	1	0	2	1	111	14

=== International ===
As of match played 14 November 2021

Appearances and goals by national team and year
National team	Year	Apps	Goals
Romania	2021	1	0
Total		1	0

== Honours ==
Farul Constanța

- Liga I: 2022–23
- Supercupa României runner-up: 2023

North Texas SC

- MLS Next Pro Championship: 2024
- MLS Next Pro Regular Season Title: 2024
