= Henri (footballer, born 2002) =

Brazilian footballer

Personal information
- Full name: Henri Marinho dos Santos
- Date of birth: 19 February 2002 (age 24)
- Place of birth: Araçatuba, Brazil
- Height: 1.91 m (6 ft 3 in)
- Position: Defender

Team information
- Current team: CRB
- Number: 44

Youth career
- –2021: Palmeiras

Senior career*
Years	Team	Apps	(Gls)
2021–2022	Palmeiras	3	(0)
2023	North Texas SC	26	(2)
2024	Mirassol	1	(0)
2025–	CRB	60	(0)

International career^{‡}
2018	Brazil U16	4	(2)
2018–2019	Brazil U17	17	(1)
2019	Brazil U18	1	(0)
- * Club domestic league appearances and goals as of 16 November 2026 ‡ National team caps and goals as of 14:27, 3 June 2021 (UTC)

Henri Marinho dos Santos (born 19 February 2002), commonly known as Henri, is a Brazilian footballer who plays as a defender for CRB.

== Career statistics ==
=== Club ===
As of 13 May 2023

Club	Season	League			Cup		Continental		Other		Total	
Club	Season	Division	Apps	Goals	Apps	Goals	Apps	Goals	Apps	Goals	Apps	Goals
Palmeiras	2021	Campeonato Paulista	3	0	0	0	0	0	0	0	3	0
North Texas SC	2023	MLS Next Pro	8	0	0	0	0	0	0	0	8	0
Career total			11	0	0	0	0	0	0	0	11	0
