= Carl Sainté =

Haitian footballer (born 2002)

Personal information
- Full name: Carl Fred Sainté
- Date of birth: 9 August 2002 (age 24)
- Place of birth: Grand-Goâve, Haiti
- Height: 1.85 m (6 ft 1 in)
- Position: Midfielder

Team information
- Current team: El Paso Locomotive FC

Youth career
- 2012–2016: AGE-Foot
- 2016–2019: ASGG
- 2019–2020: Violette

Senior career*
Years	Team	Apps	(Gls)
2020–2021	Violette	12	(0)
2021–2022	New Mexico United	5	(0)
2022	→ North Texas SC (loan)	5	(0)
2023–2024	North Texas SC	22	(1)
2024	North Texas SC	12	(1)
2024–2025	FC Dallas	2	(0)
2025	→ Phoenix Rising (loan)	24	(1)
2026–	El Paso Locomotive FC	15	(1)

International career^{‡}
2019	Haiti U17	8	(1)
2022–	Haiti	30	(0)
- * Club domestic league appearances and goals as of 21:02, 8 November 2026 (UTC) ‡ National team caps and goals as of 21:06, 4 October 2026 (UTC)

Carl Fred Sainté (born 9 August 2002) is a Haitian professional footballer who plays as a midfielder for USL Championship club El Paso Locomotive and the Haiti national team.

== Club career ==
Sainté is a youth product of the Haitian clubs AGE-Foot, ASGG, and finally Violette who he joined in 2019. He began his senior career with Violette and helped them win the 2020–21 Ligue Haïtienne. He transferred to the American club New Mexico United on 22 December 2021. He debuted with New Mexico United in a 2–0 USL Championship win over Las Vegas Lights on 14 March 2022, coming on as a late sub in the 87th minute.

FC Dallas loaned Sainté to Phoenix Rising FC until the end of the season on 3 January 2025. On 20 November, after his return to FC Dallas, the team announced that they had declined his contract option.

On 19 December 2025, Sainté signed with El Paso Locomotive.

== International career ==
Sainté represented the Haiti U17s at the 2019 FIFA U-17 World Cup. He was called up to represent the senior Haiti national team in March 2022. He debuted with the Haiti national team in a friendly 2–1 loss to Guatemala on 27 March 2022.

On 15 May 2026, he was included in Haiti head coach Sébastien Migné's 26-man squad for the 2026 FIFA World Cup.

== Career statistics ==
=== Club ===
As of match played 19 September 2026

Appearances and goals by club, season and competition
Club	Season	League			Cup		Continental		Other		Total	
Club	Season	Division	Apps	Goals	Apps	Goals	Apps	Goals	Apps	Goals	Apps	Goals
Violette	2020–21	Ligue Haïtienne	12	0	—		—		—		12	0
New Mexico United	2022	USL Championship	5	0	1	0	—		—		6	0
North Texas SC (loan)	2022	MLS Next Pro	5	0	—		—		—		5	0
North Texas SC	2023	MLS Next Pro	22	1	—		—		—		22	1
FC Dallas	2024	Major League Soccer	6	0	2	0	—		2 (Note: Appearances in Leagues Cup)	0	10	0
North Texas SC	2024	MLS Next Pro	12	1	—		—		—		12	1
Phoenix Rising (loan)	2025	USL Championship	24	1	2	0	—		2 (Note: Appearances in USL Cup)	0	28	1
El Paso Locomotive FC	2026	USL Championship	12	1	0	0	—		2	0	14	1
Career total			98	4	5	0	0	0	6	0	109	4

=== International ===
As of match played 4 October 2026

Appearances and goals by national team and year
National team	Year	Apps	Goals
Haiti	2022	5	0
Haiti	2023	10	0
Haiti	2024	5	0
Haiti	2025	4	0
Haiti	2026	6	0
Total		30	0

== Honours ==
Violette AC

- Ligue Haïtienne: 2020–21
