= Hope Avayevu =

Ghanaian footballer (born 2002)

Personal information
- Full name: Hope Kodzo Avayevu
- Date of birth: 19 October 2002 (age 24)
- Place of birth: Accra, Ghana
- Height: 5 ft 6 in (1.68 m)
- Position: Midfielder

Team information
- Current team: Phoenix Rising
- Number: 10

Youth career
- Faith Soccer Academy
- Bechem United

Senior career*
Years	Team	Apps	(Gls)
2021–2023	North Texas SC	63	(11)
2024	Ventura County FC	6	(0)
2025–	Phoenix Rising	45	(6)
- * Club domestic league appearances and goals as of 18:47, 10 November 2026 (UTC)

Hope Kodzo Avayevu (born 19 October 2002) is a Ghanaian professional footballer who plays as a midfielder for USL Championship club Phoenix Rising.

== Club career ==
Born in Accra, Avayevu began his career in the Ghana Football Association ran Faith Soccer Academy before joining Bechem United. In 2019, he traveled to the United States with Bechem United and participated in the Dallas Cup where he was invited to stay and train with Major League Soccer club FC Dallas. On 20 November 2020, Avayevu signed a professional contract with FC Dallas reserve club, North Texas SC.

He made his professional debut for North Texas SC on 24 April 2021 in their USL League One opening match against Fort Lauderdale CF, starting in the 4–2 victory.

Avayevu signed with Phoenix Rising of the USL Championship on 17 December 2024.

== Career statistics ==
As of match played 12 May 2023

Appearances and goals by club, season and competition
Club	Season	League			Cup		Continental		Total	
Club	Season	Division	Apps	Goals	Apps	Goals	Apps	Goals	Apps	Goals
North Texas SC	2021	USL League One	19	0	—		—		19	0
North Texas SC	2022	MLS Next Pro	23	5	—		—		23	5
North Texas SC	2023	MLS Next Pro	6	3	—		—		6	3
Career total			48	8	0	0	0	0	48	8
