= Pedrinho (footballer, born 2003) =

Brazilian footballer

Personal information
- Full name: Pedro Henrique Fonseca de Araújo Martins
- Date of birth: 18 April 2003 (age 23)
- Place of birth: Rio de Janeiro, Brazil
- Height: 1.75 m (5 ft 9 in)
- Position: Forward

Team information
- Current team: Maccabi Netanya
- Number: 20

Youth career
- 2012–2023: Flamengo

Senior career*
Years	Team	Apps	(Gls)
2022–2023	Flamengo	2	(0)
2022	→ Azuriz (loan)	7	(1)
2024	North Texas SC	19	(10)
2025	FC Dallas	23	(2)
2025	→ North Texas SC (loan)	1	(0)
2026–	Maccabi Netanya	4	(0)
- * Club domestic league appearances and goals as of 24 June 2026

Pedro Henrique Fonseca de Araújo Martins (born 18 April 2003), commonly known as Pedrinho, is a Brazilian professional footballer who plays as a forward for Israeli Premier League club Maccabi Netanya.

== Career ==
Born in Rio de Janeiro, Pedrinho joined Flamengo's youth setup at the age of nine. On 20 July 2021, he signed his first professional contract with the club, after agreeing to a deal until the end of 2023.

On 28 January 2022, Pedrinho was loaned to Azuriz for the season. He made his senior debut on 6 March, starting in a 3–0 Campeonato Paranaense away loss against Operário Ferroviário.

Pedrinho scored his first senior goal on 29 May 2022, netting his team's second in a 2–0 Série D away win over FC Cascavel. On 11 July, he returned to Flamengo and was again assigned to the under-20 team.

Pedrinho made his first team – and Série A – debut for Fla on 28 September 2022, coming on as a late substitute for Matheus França in a 3–2 away loss to Fortaleza.

On 14 December 2023, North Texas SC announced that Pedrinho had been signed to a one-year contract with a club option for second season. On 16 December 2024, he joined Major League Soccer side FC Dallas on a deal until the end of 2025, with options to extend. However, the team declined his contract option at the end of the season.

== Personal life ==
Pedrinho is the son of Beto, a midfielder who notably played for the top four teams of the Rio de Janeiro state.

== Career statistics ==
As of 28 October 2023.

Club	Season	League			State League		Cup		Continental		Other		Total	
Club	Season	Division	Apps	Goals	Apps	Goals	Apps	Goals	Apps	Goals	Apps	Goals	Apps	Goals
Flamengo	2022	Série A	1	0	—		—		—		—		1	0
Flamengo	2023	Série A	1	0	0	0	0	0	0	0	—		1	0
Flamengo	Total		2	0	0	0	0	0	0	0	—		2	0
Azuriz (loan)	2022	Série D	6	1	1 (Note: Appearances in the Campeonato Paranaense)	0	0	0	—		—		7	1
Career total			8	1	1	0	0	0	0	0	0	0	9	1
