= Tarik Scott =

Jamaican footballer (born 2005)

Personal information
- Full name: Tarik Scott
- Date of birth: 23 April 2005 (age 21)
- Place of birth: Brooklyn, New York, U.S.
- Height: 1.83 m (6 ft 0 in)
- Position: Left winger

Youth career
- 2011–2022: FC Dallas

Senior career*
Years	Team	Apps	(Gls)
2022–2024	North Texas SC	5	(2)
2024–2025	FC Dallas	6	(0)
2024–2025	→ North Texas SC (loan)	37	(15)
2025	→ Monterey Bay FC (loan)	9	(1)
2026–	Lexington SC	21	(3)

International career
2024–	Jamaica U20	2	(0)
- * Club domestic league appearances and goals as of 11:27, 9 November 2026 (UTC)

Tarik Scott (born 23 April 2005) is a professional footballer who plays for Lexington SC as a left-winger. Born in the United States, he is a youth international for Jamaica.

== Career ==
Scott is a product of FC Dallas' youth academy since the age of 5 in 2011. He joined their reserve team, North Texas SC, in MLS Next Pro from 2022 to 2024, scoring 9 goals and providing 2 assists during his tenure. On 15 November 2022, he signed a homegrown contract with FC Dallas for 3 years with options in 2026 and 2027. On February 3, 2023, Scott tore his right ACL and LCL during a preseason game against Malmö FF.

On 29 June 2024, Scott made his professional debut with FC Dallas in the 2024 MLS regular season, in a match against FC Cincinnati, which ended in a 1–0 loss. Scott was substituted 54 minutes into the game. On 20 November 2025, the team announced that they had declined his contract option.

== International career ==
Born in the United States, Scott is of Jamaican descent. In January 2023, he was called up to a training camp for the United States U19s. He was called up to the Jamaica U20s for a training camp in January 2024.

== Personal life ==
He is the younger brother of Malik Henry-Scott, who is also a professional soccer player.
