= Nolan Norris =

American soccer player (born 2005)

Personal information
- Date of birth: February 17, 2005 (age 21)
- Place of birth: Fort Worth, Texas, U.S.
- Height: 5 ft 11 in (1.80 m)
- Position: Center-back

Team information
- Current team: FC Dallas
- Number: 32

Youth career
- 2017–2022: FC Dallas

Senior career*
Years	Team	Apps	(Gls)
2022–2025	North Texas SC	37	(1)
2023–	FC Dallas	21	(0)

International career^{‡}
2019	United States U15	1	(0)
2022	United States U17	2	(0)
2022–2024	United States U19	2	(1)
2024–2025	United States U20	15	(2)
2023–	United States U23	7	(0)
- * Club domestic league appearances and goals as of 10:34, 25 March 2026 (UTC) ‡ National team caps and goals as of 10:34, 25 March 2026 (UTC)

Nolan Norris (born 17 February 2005) is an American professional soccer player who plays as a center-back for Major League Soccer club FC Dallas.

== Club career ==
Norris joined the academy of FC Dallas in 2017 at the age of 12. On 18 April 2022, he made his debut for North Texas SC in MLS Next Pro, playing 74 minutes in a 1–0 victory over San Jose Earthquakes II. In November 2022, Norris signed a homegrown player contract with FC Dallas, agreeing a three-year deal with the option of a further year. On 1 June 2023, he made his Major League Soccer debut for FC Dallas, starting in a 2–1 defeat to Sporting Kansas City. On 25 April 2026 he scored his first MLS goal in a 2–1 loss to Seattle Sounders.

== International career ==
Norris has represented the United States at various youth international levels up to under–23s where he featured in the 2023 Pan American Games.

== Personal life ==
Norris is the oldest of six siblings, all of whom have played in the FC Dallas Academy.
