= Amet Korça =

American soccer player (born 2000)

Personal information
- Full name: Amet Ylber Korça
- Date of birth: September 16, 2000 (age 26)
- Place of birth: Arlington, Texas, United States
- Height: 6 ft 3 in (1.91 m)
- Position: Defender

Youth career
- –2019: Solar SC
- 2019–2020: Dinamo Zagreb

Senior career*
Years	Team	Apps	(Gls)
2019–2020	Dinamo Zagreb	0	(0)
2020	→ NK Dubrava (loan)	8	(0)
2020–2022	NK Dubrava	57	(6)
2022–2023	HNK Gorica	2	(0)
2023–2024	FC Dallas	4	(0)
2023–2024	→ North Texas SC	33	(0)
2025–2026	NK Dubrava	31	(1)
- * Club domestic league appearances and goals as of June 16, 2026

Amet Ylber Korça (born September 16, 2000) is an American professional soccer player who plays as a defender.

== Early life ==
Korça is from Arlington, Texas, where he attended The Oakridge School. He played youth soccer for Solar SC in North Texas. He joined Dinamo Zagreb in 2019.

== Career ==
Korça joined NK Dubrava from Dinamo Zagreb, initially on loan, before joining permanently and becoming club captain in his final season. When he left the club he bought a new washing machine for his former club as a farewell gift. In June 2022 Korça was announced as a new signing for HNK Gorica, signing a three-year contract. Playing for HNK Gorica in the Croatian Football League he only managed two appearances which included a red card away against HNK Hajduk Split.

In January 2023 he agreed to join FC Dallas, signing a one-year contract with options for 2024 and 2025. He was re-signed by Dallas for the 2024 season but released prior to the 2025 season. Korça rejoined NK Dubrava in 2025.

== Personal life ==
Korça was born in Texas to Albanian parents.
