= Isaiah Parker =

American soccer player

Personal information
- Date of birth: September 1, 2002 (age 24)
- Place of birth: Gurnee, Illinois, United States
- Height: 5 ft 8 in (1.73 m)
- Positions: Left-back; left midfielder

Youth career
- 2016–2021: Chicago FC United

College career
Years	Team	Apps	(Gls)
2021	Saint Louis Billikens	21	(3)

Senior career*
Years	Team	Apps	(Gls)
2022–2024	FC Dallas	0	(0)
2022–2024	→ North Texas SC	36	(3)
2023	→ San Antonio FC (loan)	9	(0)
- * Club domestic league appearances and goals as of October 31, 2024

Isaiah Parker (born September 1, 2002) is an American soccer player.

== Career ==
=== Youth and college ===
Parker joined the Chicago FC United academy in 2016, and played with the academy team throughout high school. Parked helped the FC United U17 & U19 teams to the U.S. Soccer Development Academy and the MLS Next Playoffs. During the 2019–20 USSDA season, Parker lead FC United's under-19 team in goals scored with 12 goals.

Parker signed a National Letter of Intent with Saint Louis University ahead of the 2021 NCAA Division I men's soccer season. He made his college soccer debut for the men's soccer team on August 26, 2021, in a 2–1 win over Louisville. Parker started and played the entire match and made an assist in the match. Parker helped Saint Louis achieve a 16–1–4 season record, their best record since 2001. The Billikens ended up going on a run in the 2021 NCAA Division I Men's Soccer Tournament, where they reached the Quarterfinals (for the first time since 2003), before losing to eventual National Runners-Up, Washington.

Parker finished his freshman year by being named to the Atlantic 10 Conference All-Rookie team and the TopDrawer Soccer first-team Freshman Best XI team.

=== Professional ===
Following his freshman season, Parker signed a Generation adidas contract with Major League Soccer, making him eligible for the 2022 MLS SuperDraft. A prospective Top 10 pick, Parker was selected third overall in the 2022 MLS Draft by FC Dallas on January 11, 2022. Parker became the highest drafted player out of Saint Louis University since Matt McKeon in 1996.

Parker was sent on loan to North Texas SC, FC Dallas' reserve team for the duration of the 2022 season. On March 26, 2022, Parker made his professional debut for North Texas, playing the entire match at left back in a 3–1 victory over Minnesota United FC 2.

He was released by Dallas following their 2024 season.

== Honors ==
Individual

- Atlantic 10 Conference All-Rookie team: 2021
- TopDrawerSoccer All Freshman Best XI: 2021
