= Tomas Pondeca =

American soccer player (born 2001)

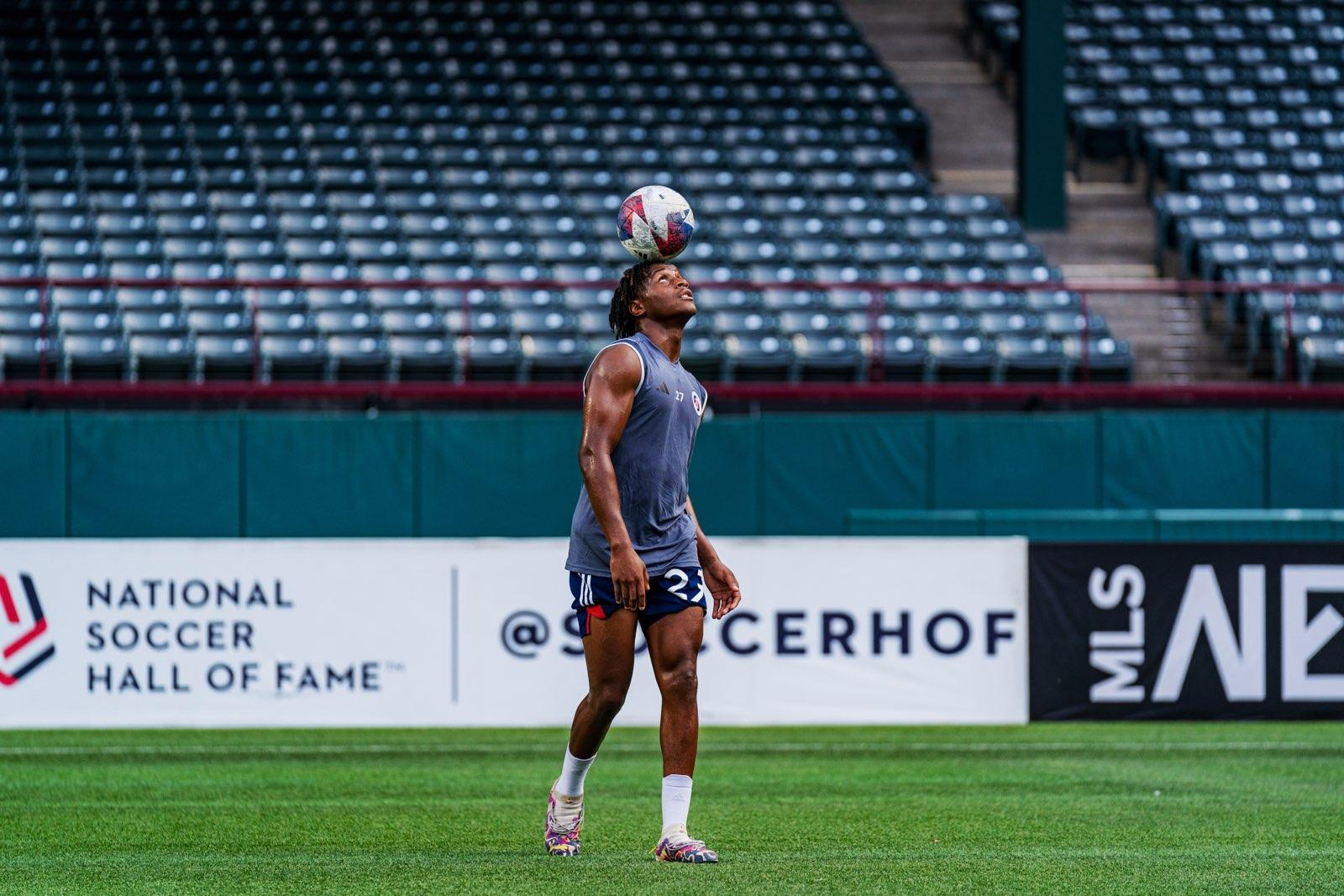

Personal information
- Date of birth: October 10, 2001 (age 25)
- Place of birth: Tucson, Arizona, US
- Height: 5 ft 8 in (1.73 m)
- Position: Midfielder

Team information
- Current team: Corpus Christi
- Number: 27

Youth career
- 2016–2020: Marcus Marauders

Senior career*
Years	Team	Apps	(Gls)
2023	North Texas SC	23	(4)
2024–2025	FC Dallas	3	(0)
2024	→ North Texas SC	20	(5)
2025	→ New Mexico United (loan)	15	(0)
2026–	Corpus Christi	24	(1)

International career^{‡}
2020–	United States futsal	17	(6)
- * Club domestic league appearances and goals as of October 31, 2026 ‡ National team caps and goals as of January 14, 2025

Tomas Pondeca (born October 10, 2001) is an American professional soccer player who plays as a midfielder for Corpus Christi in USL League One.

== Career ==
=== Youth and amateur ===
Pondeca played for the Marauders varsity soccer program at Marcus High School in Flower Mound, Texas from 2016 to 2020. He was recognized as an Allstate All-American in 2019.

He joined French futsal side Paris ACASA futsal in 2020, scoring once in 5 appearances.

=== Professional ===
Following an open trial with North Texas SC, Pondeca signed a contract for the MLS Next Pro season on March 10, 2023.

Pondeca signed a 2-year contract with FC Dallas of Major League Soccer on December 15, 2023. He made his league debut with the club on June 29, 2024, in a match against. FC Cincinnati.

On January 13, 2025, New Mexico United announced they had acquired Pondeca on loan from FC Dallas for the 2025 USL Championship season. Pondeca returned to FC Dallas at the end of the season and his contract option was declined.

=== International ===
Pondeca made his debut for the United States men's national futsal team on March 3, 2020, against Slovakia.

At the 2021 CONCACAF Futsal Championship, he tallied two goals and was awarded the tournament Young Player Award.

== Honors ==
Individual

- Young Player Award: 2021 CONCACAF Futsal Championship

North Texas SC

- MLS Next Pro Champions: 2024
