= José Mulato =

Colombian footballer (born 2003)

Personal information
- Full name: José Daniel Mulato Palacios
- Date of birth: 9 January 2003 (age 23)
- Place of birth: Cali, Colombia
- Height: 1.80 m (5 ft 11 in)
- Position: Forward

Team information
- Current team: Posušje (on loan from Spartak Subotica)
- Number: 90

Youth career
- –2020: Deportivo Cali

Senior career*
Years	Team	Apps	(Gls)
2020–2022	Deportivo Cali	5	(0)
2022	→ North Texas SC (loan)	21	(9)
2022–2024	FC Dallas	7	(0)
2023	→ North Texas SC (loan)	20	(11)
2024	→ San Antonio FC (loan)	9	(0)
2024–	Spartak Subotica	13	(0)
2025	→ Igman Konjic (loan)	16	(3)
2025–	→ Posušje (loan)	27	(5)

International career
2021	Colombia U19	1	(0)
- * Club domestic league appearances and goals as of 12 June 2026

José Daniel Mulato Palacios (born 9 January 2003) is a Colombian professional footballer who currently plays as a forward for Posušje, on loan from Spartak Subotica.

== Club career ==
Born in Cali, Colombia, Mulato started his career with Deportivo Cali, making his debut in January 2020. In mid-2021, he was invited to train with German champions Bayern Munich, as part of their "World Squad" programme. Following this, he was signed by Bayern Munich affiliate, and American side FC Dallas' reserve team, North Texas SC on loan for the 2022 season. On 18 November 2022, he signed a permanent deal with FC Dallas.

=== 2024 ===
On March 6, 2024, Mulato was loaned to USL Championship side San Antonio FC for the 2024 season. On June 27, FC Dallas terminated Mulato's loan, and subsequently announced his permanent transfer to FK Spartak Subotica in the Serbian SuperLiga.

== Career statistics ==
=== Club ===
As of 1 May 2023

Club	Season	League			National Cup (Note: Appearances in the Copa Colombia)		Continental		Other		Total	
Club	Season	Division	Apps	Goals	Apps	Goals	Apps	Goals	Apps	Goals	Apps	Goals
Deportivo Cali	2020	Categoría Primera A	2	0	1	0	0	0	0	0	3	0
Deportivo Cali	2021	Categoría Primera A	1	0	0	0	0	0	0	0	1	0
Deportivo Cali	2022	Categoría Primera A	2	0	0	0	0	0	0	0	2	0
Deportivo Cali	Total		5	0	1	0	0	0	0	0	6	0
North Texas SC (loan)	2022	MLS Next Pro	21	9	–		–		–		21	9
FC Dallas	2023	Major League Soccer	2	0	0	0	0	0	0	0	2	0
North Texas SC (loan)	2023	MLS Next Pro	7	0	–		–		–		7	0
Career total			35	9	1	0	0	0	0	0	36	9
