= Herbert Endeley =

American soccer player (born 2001)

Personal information
- Date of birth: October 9, 2001 (age 25)
- Place of birth: Blaine, Minnesota, US
- Height: 5 ft 10 in (1.78 m)
- Positions: Winger; forward

Team information
- Current team: Forward Madison
- Number: 27

Youth career
- –2019: Minneapolis United

College career
Years	Team	Apps	(Gls)
2019–2022	Indiana Hoosiers	84	(12)

Senior career*
Years	Team	Apps	(Gls)
2021	Ocean City Nor'easters	0	(0)
2022	Minneapolis City SC	3	(1)
2023–2025	FC Dallas	12	(0)
2023–2025	→ North Texas SC	36	(6)
2025	→ Colorado Springs Switchbacks (loan)	7	(1)
2026–	Forward Madison	0	(0)
- * Club domestic league appearances and goals as of October 31, 2026

Herbert Endeley (born October 9, 2001) is an American soccer player who plays as a forward for USL League One club Forward Madison FC.

== Career ==
=== Youth, college, and amateur ===
Endeley was born in Blaine, Minnesota, but moved to Tanzania when he was four years old where he lived for five years. Endeley returned to the United States and attended Totino-Grace High School, where he scored 77 goals in 74 career games. He earned First-Team All-State honors, All-America, and All-Midwest accolades. For the 2018–19 season, he was named Mr. Soccer for the state of Minnesota as well as the Minneapolis Star Tribune Player of the Year. Endeley also played club soccer with local side Minneapolis United.

Endeley attended Indiana University Bloomington to play college soccer. Over four seasons with the Hoosiers, Endeley made 84 appearances, scoring 12 goals and tallying 17 assists. He was an All-Big Ten Conference selection every year of his collegiate career, including earning second-team all-conference honors his senior season.

While at college, Endeley was announced as a new signing for the amateur side Ocean City Nor'easters for their upcoming 2021 season in the USL League Two, but he never made an appearance for the team. In 2022, Endeley joined up with USL League Two side Minneapolis City SC where he made three appearances and scored a single goal.

=== Professional ===
On December 21, 2022, Endeley was selected 24th overall in the 2023 MLS SuperDraft by FC Dallas. On February 15, 2023, Endeley signed his first professional contract with Dallas on an initial one-year deal. He made his FC Dallas debut on May 27, 2023, appearing as an 84th-minute substitute during a 1–1 draw with San Jose Earthquakes. Endeley also spent time on loan with the club's MLS Next Pro side North Texas SC.

On March 27, 2025, Endeley was loaned to USL Championship side Colorado Springs Switchbacks for the remainder of the season. However, on June 2 his loan was terminated early due to injury. On November 20, FC Dallas announced that they had declined his contract option.

Endeley signed with Forward Madison of USL League One on June 29, 2026.
