= North Texas SC =

Soccer club in the United States

- Full name: North Texas Soccer Club
- Founded: November 2, 2018; 7 years ago
- Stadium: Texas Health Mansfield Stadium; Mansfield, Texas
- Capacity: 7,000
- Owners: FC Dallas (Clark and Dan Hunt)
- General manager: Matt Denny
- Head coach: John Gall
- League: MLS Next Pro
- 2025: 6th, Western Conference; Playoffs: Conference Quarterfinals
- Website: fcdallas.com/northtexassc
Home colors	Away colors

North Texas Soccer Club is a professional soccer club that competes in MLS Next Pro, the third division of American soccer. The team is owned by, and operates as the reserve team of the Major League Soccer club FC Dallas. North Texas SC currently plays most home games at Texas Health Mansfield Stadium, located in Mansfield, Texas. Before the 2022 restructuring of MLS reserve teams, the team competed in USL League One as one of the league's founding members.

== History ==
On November 2, 2018, it was announced by FC Dallas that Dallas would be granted a side to play in the newly created United Soccer League third division for 2019. The club then officially announced the name of the reserve side, North Texas SC, and crest on December 6, 2018. In the team's first season, and despite playing mostly youth players from FC Dallas, North Texas SC won the USL League One championship, having already won the inaugural regular season title. Moreover, the team announced in October that they would be moving from Toyota Stadium, where FC Dallas plays their games, to Choctaw Stadium in Arlington, Texas for the 2020 USL League One season, where they share the newly modified stadium with XFL team the Dallas Renegades and Dallas Jackals of MLR.

On December 11, 2024, North Texas SC announced that it will play all its home games in a new 7,000 seater soccer-specific stadium in Mansfield, Texas. The new stadium is set to open in 2026.

=== MLS Next Pro ===
The club announced on December 6, 2021, that it was joining the inaugural 21-team MLS Next Pro season starting in 2022.

== Players and staff ==
=== Current roster ===
As of April 2, 2025

No.	Pos.	Nation	Player
4	DF	USA	Ian Charles
6	MF	ITA	Umberto Pelà
8	MF	NGA	Favour Aroyameh
10	MF	BEL	Edouard Nys
11	MF	TRI	Nathaniel James
12	DF	USA	Jonah Biggar
13	GK	USA	Eryk Dymora
14	DF	BRA	Leandro Gonçalves
17	DF	USA	Zach Molomo
18	MF	USA	Timothy Ospina
19	MF	FRA	Marlon Luccin
23	FW	BRA	Samuel Sedeh
30	FW	MEX	Da'vian Kimbrough (on loan from Sacramento Republic)
31	GK	USA	Thomas Burchfield
32	MF	BRA	Lucas Martins
46	DF	USA	Isaiah Kaakoush
55	DF	USA	Wyatt Easterly
57	GK	USA	Nicolas Arango
—	FW	BRA	Willian Gabriel (on loan from Toluca)

Signed to first team contract with FC Dallas.
FC Dallas Academy player.

=== Staff ===
Position	Name
General manager	(England) Matt Denny
Head coach	(Wales) John Gall
Assistant coach	(England) Nicky Law
Assistant coach	(United States) Matt Hedges
Goalkeeper coach	(United States) Kyle Zobeck
Performance coach	(Brazil) Joshua Nascimento
Performance Analyst	(United States) Curran Dhar
Head Athletic Trainer	(United States) Tyler Harmon

== Statistics and records ==
=== Season-by-season ===
As of January 7, 2026

Season	League											Position		Playoffs	US Open Cup	Top Scorer	
Season	Div	League	Pld	W	L	D	GF	GA	GD	Pts	PPG	Conf.	Overall	Playoffs	US Open Cup	Name	Goals
2019	3	USL1	28	17	6	5	53	31	+22	56	2.00	–	1st	Champions	Did not enter *	(Haiti) Ronaldo Damus	16
2020	3	USL1	16	7	3	6	27	19	+8	27	1.68	–	3rd	Did not qualify	Did not enter *	(Haiti) Ronaldo Damus	5
2021	3	USL1	28	10	8	10	40	32	+8	40	1.42	–	6th	Quarter-finals	Did not enter *	(United States) Gibran Rayo	7
2022	3	MLSNP	24	13	6	5	48	31	+17	46	1.92	4th, Western	5th	Conference Semi-finals	Did not enter *	(United States) Bernard Kamungo	16
2023	3	MLSNP	28	9	11	8	43	45	−2	36	1.29	9th, Western	18th	Did not qualify	Did not enter*	(Colombia) José Mulato	11
2024	3	MLSNP	28	16	4	8	56	32	+24	62	2.21	1st, Western	1st	Champions	Did not enter	(Brazil) Pedrinho	13
2025	3	MLSNP	28	11	11	6	46	56	-10	43	1.54	6th, Western	12th	Conference Quarterfinals	Did not enter	(United States) Sam Sarver	19
Total			180	83	49	48	313	247	+66	310	1.72	—	—	—	—	(United States) Bernard Kamungo	22
*Prior to 2024 MLS reserve team, North Texas SC was ineligible to enter the U.S. Open Cup.

=== Head coaches record ===
As of July 31, 2026

Name	Nationality	From	To	P	W	D	L	GF	GA	Win%
Eric Quill	United States	September 11, 2018	December 22, 2021	75	36	21	18	124	84	48.00
Pa-Modou Kah	Norway	January 21, 2022	January 6, 2023	25	13	5	7	50	33	52.00
Javier Cano	Spain	January 12, 2023	July 17, 2023	19	5	8	6	25	33	26.32
John Gall	Wales	July 17, 2023	June 11, 2024	21	11	4	6	39	20	52.38
Michel Garbini	Brazil	June 11, 2024	December 5, 2024	15	8	3	4	27	22	53.33
John Gall	Wales	December 5, 2024	Present	48	17	12	19	76	88	35.42

=== Average attendance ===
Year	Reg. season	Playoffs
2019	1,367	3,656
2020	885	–
2021	856	–
2022	931	N/A
2023	1,058	–
2024	1,090	3,382
2025	1,008	N/A

== Honors ==
- USL League One Championship
  - Winners: 2019
- USL League One Regular Season Title
  - Winners: 2019
- MLS Next Pro Championship
  - Winners: 2024
- MLS Next Pro Regular Season Title
  - Winners: 2024
- MLS Next Pro Western Conference
  - Champions (Playoffs): 2024
- MLS Next Pro Invitational Championship
  - Winners: 2025

=== Player honors ===
Year	Player	Country	Position	Honor
2019	Ronaldo Damus	Haiti	Forward	Golden Boot Winner; All-League First Team
2019	Arturo Rodríguez	Mexico	Midfielder	Most Valuable Player; Young Player of the Year; Assists Champion; All-League First Team
2019	Ricardo Pepi	United States	Forward	All-League Second Team
2019	Alfusainey Jatta	(The Gambia) Gambia	Midfielder	All-League Second Team
2022	Bernard Kamungo	United States	Forward	MLS Next Pro Best XI

== See also ==
- USL League One
