= 2016 Saint Louis FC season =

Saint Louis FC
2016 season
- CEO: Jim Kavanaugh
- Head coach: Dale Schilly; Tim Leonard (Interim)
- United Soccer League: Conference: 14th League: 22nd Playoffs: DNQ
- U.S. Open Cup: 3rd Round
- Top goalscorer: League: Irvin Herrera (14); All: Irvin Herrera (14)
- Highest home attendance: 6,004 (September 17 vs. Louisville City FC)
- Lowest home attendance: League: 4,209 (August 31 vs. Oklahoma City Energy); Open Cup: 2,065 (June 1 vs. Minnesota United)
- Average home league attendance: 4,923
- Biggest win: 7–1 (June 11 vs. Tulsa Roughnecks)
- Biggest defeat: 1–5 (September 17 vs. Louisville City)
Home colors	Away colors	Third colors

The 2016 Saint Louis FC season was the franchise's second season in the United Soccer League, the third division of soccer in the United States.

After playing their first season in the Eastern Conference of the USL, due to the addition of new teams to the league the club moved to the Western Conference for 2016.

The club also renewed their affiliation with the Chicago Fire of Major League Soccer for the 2016 season, having partnered with them the previous year.

== Current squad ==
Where a player has not declared an international allegiance, nation is determined by place of birth.
As of May 21, 2016. Sources:

No.	Position	Nation	Player
0	GK	MEX	Eduardo Cortes
1	GK	USA	Mark Pais
2	DF	JAM	Richard Dixon
3	DF	USA	Sam Fink
4	DF	USA	A. J. Cochran
5	DF	USA	Mitchell Lurie
6	MF	USA	Parker Maher
7	MF	JAM	Jamiel Hardware
8	MF	WAL	Chad Bond
9	FW	JAM	Jeremie Lynch
10	MF	JPN	Kentaro Takada
11	MF	USA	Charles Renken
12	MF	USA	Tyler David
13	GK	JAM	Ryan Thompson
14	DF	NZL	James Musa
15	FW	USA	Mike Ambersley
16	DF	USA	Jake Bond
17	MF	USA	Jacob Bushue
18	MF	USA	Drew Conner (on loan from Chicago Fire)
19	FW	SLV	Irvin Herrera
20	MF	USA	Vince Cicciarelli
21	DF	USA	Chad Vandegriffe
22	DF	USA	Patrick Doody (on loan from Chicago Fire)
23	FW	ENG	Jordan Roberts
25	MF	USA	Brandon Barklage
32	MF	ZIM	Schillo Tshuma
55	DF	USA	Aedan Stanley
91	MF	USA	Seth Rudolph

== Player movement ==
=== Returning Players from 2015 ===
No.	Position	Player	Nation	Date Signed	Ref
15	Forward	Mike Ambersley	United States	January 13, 2015	
17	Midfielder	Jacob Bushue	United States	January 15, 2015	
2	Defender	Richard Dixon	Jamaica	January 15, 2015	
1	Goalkeeper	Mark Pais	United States	January 15, 2015	
10	Midfielder	Kentaro Takada (Note: Takada played for St. Louis Ambush during the USL offseason)	Japan	January 15, 2015	
11	Midfielder	Charles Renken	United States	January 20, 2015	
6	Midfielder	Parker Maher	United States	February 13, 2015	
14	Defender	James Musa (Note: Musa played for Team Wellington during the USL offseason)	New Zealand	February 25, 2015	
3	Defender	Sam Fink	United States	March 7, 2015	
7	Midfielder	Jamiel Hardware	Jamaica	March 7, 2015	
9	Forward	Jeremie Lynch	Jamaica	March 10, 2015	
23	Forward	Jordan Roberts	England	March 10, 2015	
21	Defender	Chad Vandegriffe (Note: Vandegriffe played for St. Louis Ambush during the USL offseason)	United States	March 13, 2015	
25	Midfielder	Brandon Barklage	United States	March 20, 2015	

=== New Signings ===
No.	Position	Player	Nation	Previous Team	Date Signed	Ref
8	Midfielder	Chad Bond	Wales	(United States) Tulsa Roughnecks	January 7, 2016	
19	Forward	Irvin Herrera	El Salvador	(El Salvador) Santa Tecla	February 18, 2016	
20	Midfielder	Vince Cicciarelli	United States	(United States) Des Moines Menace (United States) Saint Louis Billikens	March 3, 2016	
13	Goalkeeper	Ryan Thompson	Jamaica	(United States) Pittsburgh Riverhounds	March 3, 2016	
4	Defender	A. J. Cochran	United States	(United States) Houston Dynamo	March 6, 2016	
12	Midfielder	Tyler David	United States	(United States) Saint Louis Billikens	March 6, 2016	
16	Defender	Jake Bond	United States	(United States) Kitsap Pumas	March 16, 2016	
5	Defender	Mitchell Lurie	United States	(United States) Rutgers Scarlet Knights	March 16, 2016	
32	Midfielder	Schillo Tshuma	Zimbabwe	(United States) Arizona United	March 25, 2016	
0	Goalkeeper	Eduardo Cortes	Mexico	(United States) IUPUI Jaguars	March 31, 2016	
91	Midfielder	Seth Rudolph	United States	(Sweden) Sandvikens IF	April 22, 2016	
24	Goalkeeper	Sean Clancy	United States	(United States) UMKC Kangaroos	Date Unknown	

=== Academy Signings ===
No.	Position	Player	Nation	Previous Team	Date Signed	Ref
44	Midfielder	Wan Kuzain	Malaysia	(United States) St. Louis Scott Gallagher	May 21, 2016	
55	Defender	Aedan Stanley	United States	(United States) St. Louis Scott Gallagher	May 21, 2016	

=== Loans ===
==== In ====
No.	Position	Player	Nation	Loaned From	Date Loaned	Notes	Ref
18	Midfielder	Drew Conner	United States	(United States) Chicago Fire	March 25, 2016	Season-long loan (with option to recall)	
22	Defender	Patrick Doody	United States	(United States) Chicago Fire	March 25, 2016	Season-long loan (with option to recall)	
26	Defender	Eric Gehrig	United States	(United States) Chicago Fire	March 28, 2016		
30	Goalkeeper	Patrick McLain	United States	(United States) Chicago Fire	April 22, 2016	Single-game loan	
27	Midfielder	Collin Fernandez	United States	(United States) Chicago Fire	August 10, 2016	Season-long loan (with option to recall)	
29	Midfielder	Alex Morrell	United States	(United States) Chicago Fire	August 10, 2016	Season-long loan (with option to recall)	
28	Midfielder	Jason Plumhoff	United States	(United States) Jacksonville Armada	August 26, 2016		

==== Out ====
No.	Position	Player	Nation	Loaned To	Date Loaned	Notes	Ref
9	Forward	Jeremie Lynch	Jamaica	(United States) Wilmington Hammerheads	July 28, 2016	Season-long loan	

== United Soccer League season ==
=== Preseason ===
February 25	Charleston Cougars	2–0	Saint Louis FC	Mount Pleasant, SC
1:00 PM CST	First Half'; First Half'	Source; Source		Stadium: CofC Soccer Stadium at Patriot's Point
Note: Postponed from original date of February 24

February 27	Coastal Carolina Chanticleers	2–2	Saint Louis FC	Conway, SC
9:00 AM CST	32'; 58'	Source; Source; Source; Source; Source	Lynch 12'; Roberts 74'	Stadium: CCU Soccer Field
Note: Match played with three periods of 30 minutes each

February 27	Charleston Battery	1–1	Saint Louis FC	Charleston, SC
3:00 PM CST	Portillo 59'	Source; Source	Lynch 70'	Stadium: MUSC Health Stadium
Note: Match played with three periods of 30 minutes each

March 13	Oklahoma City Energy	0–0	Saint Louis FC	Springfield, MO
2:00 PM CDT		Source		Stadium: Lake Country Soccer Complex

March 16	Evansville Purple Aces	1–2	Saint Louis FC	Evansville, IN
5:00 PM CDT	McGrath 76'	Report	Roberts 25', 50'	Stadium: Arad McCutchan Stadium

March 16	Indy Eleven	1–1	Saint Louis FC	Evansville, IN
7:30 PM CDT	Smart 64'	Report	Herrera 46'	Stadium: Arad McCutchan Stadium

March 19	SIU Edwardsville Cougars	0–0	Saint Louis FC	Edwardsville, IL
3:00 PM CDT		Report		Stadium: Ralph Korte Stadium

=== Results summary ===
Overall								Home						Away					
Pld	W	D	L	GF	GA	GD	Pts	W	D	L	GF	GA	GD	W	D	L	GF	GA	GD
30	8	10	12	42	44	−2	34	4	7	4	23	20	+3	4	3	8	19	24	−5

Source: Match reports

Round	1	2	3	4	5	6	7	8	9	10	11	12	13	14	15	16	17	18	19	20	21	22	23	24	25	26	27	28	29	30	31
Stadium	A	A	A	A	H	A	H	H	A	A	H	H	A	H	A	H	A	H	H	A	H	H	H	H	A	H	H	A	A	H	A
Result	L	L	W	D	D	W	P	W	L	W	D	D	L	W	L	W	L	D	L	L	W	D	D	L	D	L	D	L	W	L	D

Source: Match reports
A = Away; H = Home; W = Win; D = Draw; L = Loss

=== Matches ===
March 26 01	Real Monarchs	1–0	Saint Louis FC	Sandy, UT
8:00 PM CDT	Orellana 90+1'	Report (STLFC); Report (USL)	Musa (yellow card) 43'; C. Bond (yellow card) 90+5'	Stadium: Rio Tinto Stadium; Attendance: 2,453; Referee: Tyler Ploeger

March 30 02	LA Galaxy II	3–0	Saint Louis FC	Carson, CA
9:30 PM CDT	McBean 43', 58'; Rebellón 45+1'	Report (STLFC); Report (USL)	Bushue (yellow card) 56'; Cochran (yellow card) 74'	Stadium: StubHub Center; Attendance: 743; Referee: Alejandro Mariscal

April 2 03	Orange County Blues	1–3	Saint Louis FC	Irvine, CA
9:00 PM CDT	Griffiths 24'; Mirković (yellow card) 76'; Felix (yellow card) 84'	Report (STLFC); Report (USL)	Musa 32'; Maher (yellow card) 45+3'; Fink (yellow card) 70'; Cicciarelli 88', 90+7'	Stadium: Anteater Stadium; Attendance: 1,107; Referee: Bernhard Hosu

April 9 04	Oklahoma City Energy	2–2	Saint Louis FC	Oklahoma City, OK
7:00 PM CDT	Dalgaard 9'; Gonzalez (yellow card) 39'; Craft 60'	Report (STLFC); Report (USL)	Cicciarelli 23'; Doody 36'; Bushue (yellow card) 64'; Fink (yellow card) 80'	Stadium: Taft Stadium; Referee: Younes Marrakchi

April 16 05	Saint Louis FC	0–0	Tulsa Roughnecks	Fenton, MO
7:30 PM CDT	Musa (yellow card) 65'	Report (STLFC); Report (USL)		Stadium: World Wide Technology Soccer Park; Attendance: 5,531; Referee: Malik Badawi

April 23 06	Sacramento Republic	0–1	Saint Louis FC	Sacramento, CA
9:30 PM CDT	Foran (yellow card) 90+5'	Report (STLFC); Report (USL)	Musa (yellow card) 24'; Ambersley 59'; Dixon (yellow card) 71'; McLain (yellow card) 90+4'	Stadium: Bonney Field; Attendance: 11,569; Referee: Michael Zapata

April 30 07	Saint Louis FC	Postponed	Vancouver Whitecaps 2	Fenton, MO
7:30 PM CDT				Stadium: World Wide Technology Soccer Park
Note: Postponed due to inclement weather, rescheduled for May 25

May 7 08	Saint Louis FC	3–0	Swope Park Rangers	Fenton, MO
7:30 PM CDT	Tshuma 11'; C. Bond 39', (yellow card) 43' (yellow-red card) 79'; Herrera 52'	Report (STLFC); Report (USL)	Ballo (yellow card) 17' (yellow-red card) 45+1'	Stadium: World Wide Technology Soccer Park; Attendance: 5,028

May 14 09	Louisville City	2–0	Saint Louis FC	Louisville, KY
6:30 PM CDT	Davis 77'; Lancaster 90' (pen.)	Report (STLFC); Report (USL)	Conner (yellow card) 67'; Pais (yellow card) 89'	Stadium: Louisville Slugger Field; Attendance: 7,859; Referee: Aaron Hernandez

May 21 10	Tulsa Roughnecks	2–5	Saint Louis FC	Tulsa, OK
7:00 PM CDT	Davoren (red card) 17'; Ramos Carpio 29'; Ochoa 37', (yellow card) 76'; Grimes (yellow card) 83'	Report (STLFC); Report (USL)	Herrera 10', 53', 71', 78'; Musa 84', (yellow card) 88'	Stadium: ONEOK Field; Attendance: 4,451; Referee: Cuauhtemoc Delgadill

May 25 11	Saint Louis FC	1–1	Vancouver Whitecaps 2	Fenton, MO
7:00 PM CDT	Fink (yellow card) 21'; Barklage (yellow card) 25'; Cochran (yellow card) 45+4'; Hardware 62'; C. Bond (yellow card) 90+3'	Report (STLFC); Report (USL)	Levis 23'; Seymore (yellow card) 45+4'	Stadium: World Wide Technology Soccer Park; Attendance: 4,763
Note: Rescheduled from April 30 due to inclement weather

May 29 12	Saint Louis FC	1–1	Rio Grande Valley Toros	Fenton, MO
7:30 PM CDT	Dixon (yellow card) 45+3'; Herrera 76'	Report (STLFC); Report (USL)	Escalante 69'; James (yellow card) 89'	Stadium: World Wide Technology Soccer Park; Attendance: 4,704

June 4 13	Colorado Springs Switchbacks	2–0	Saint Louis FC	Colorado Springs, CO
8:00 PM CDT	Maybin 3'; Gonzalez 18'; Suggs (yellow card) 41'	Report (USL)	Bushue (yellow card) 59'	Stadium: Switchbacks Stadium; Attendance: 3,910

June 11 14	Saint Louis FC	7–1	Tulsa Roughnecks	Fenton, MO
7:30 PM CDT	Rudolph 4', 50'; Herrera 17', 52'; Hardware 38'; Roberts 76'; Cicciarelli 78'	Report (STLFC); Report (USL)	Mata (yellow card) 37'; Peters (yellow card) 39'; Abidor (yellow card) 60'; Morgan (yellow card) 65'; Ramos Carpio 85'	Stadium: World Wide Technology Soccer Park; Attendance: 4,749

June 18 15	Arizona United	2–1	Saint Louis FC	Peoria, AZ
9:30 PM CDT	Blackwood 9'; Tan 58'	Report (USL)	Hardware (yellow card) 19'; Bushue (yellow card) 79'; Ambersley (yellow card) 80'; Roberts 90+2'	Stadium: Peoria Sports Complex; Attendance: 1,002

June 25 16	Saint Louis FC	1–0	Portland Timbers 2	Fenton, MO
7:30 PM CDT	Musa (yellow card) 32'; Herrera 58' (pen.)	Report (STLFC); Report (USL)	Clarke (yellow card) 54'; Gallagher (yellow card) 59'; Casiple (yellow card) 83'	Stadium: World Wide Technology Soccer Park; Attendance: 5,513

July 2 17	Swope Park Rangers	1–0	Saint Louis FC	Kansas City, MO
7:30 PM CDT	Pasher 1'	Report (STLFC); Report (USL)	Hardware (yellow card) 44'; C. Bond (yellow card) 64'	Stadium: Swope Soccer Village; Attendance: 933; Referee: Sorin Stoica
Note: Play was temporarily suspended in the 37th minute due to lightning

July 6 18	Saint Louis FC	1–1	Seattle Sounders 2	Fenton, MO
7:00 PM CDT	Fink 87'	Report (USL)	Alihodžić 12'	Stadium: World Wide Technology Soccer Park; Attendance: 4,400

July 9 19	Saint Louis FC	1–2	FC Cincinnati	Fenton, MO
7:30 PM CDT	Cummings 8'; McMahon (yellow card) 58'; Mohamed (yellow card) 60'; Stevenson 78'	Report (STLFC); Report (USL)	Ambersley (yellow card) 26'; Fink (yellow card) 61'; Tshuma 85'; Barklage (yellow card) 90+3'	Stadium: World Wide Technology Soccer Park; Attendance: 4,502

July 15 20	Tulsa Roughnecks	2–0	Saint Louis FC	Tulsa, OK
7:30 PM CDT	Villalobos 66'; Ochoa 83'	Report (USL)		Stadium: ONEOK Field; Attendance: 4,776

July 23 21	Saint Louis FC	2–1	Colorado Springs Switchbacks	Fenton, MO
7:30 PM CDT	Musa 26'; Herrera 45+2'	Report (USL)	Maybin 54'	Stadium: World Wide Technology Soccer Park; Attendance: 4,771

July 30 22	Saint Louis FC	0–0	Oklahoma City Energy	Fenton, MO
7:30 PM CDT		Report (USL)		Stadium: World Wide Technology Soccer Park; Attendance: 4,370

August 3 23	Saint Louis FC	1–1	Swope Park Rangers	Fenton, MO
7:00 PM CDT	Cochran (yellow card) 53'; Herrera 64'; David (yellow card) 68'	Report (STLFC); Report (USL)	Meyer (yellow card) 20'; Rubio 34'; Didic (yellow card) 64'	Stadium: World Wide Technology Soccer Park; Attendance: 4,582

August 13 24	Saint Louis FC	3–4	Sacramento Republic	Fenton, MO
7:30 PM CDT	Ambersley 26'; Roberts 74'; C. Bond 90'	Report (USL)	Koval 5'; Iwasa 11', 57'; Guzmán 17'	Stadium: World Wide Technology Soccer Park; Attendance: 5,453

August 21 25	Swope Park Rangers	1–1	Saint Louis FC	Kansas City, KS
6:00 PM CDT	Barrett 89'	Report (USL)	Cicciarelli 80'	Stadium: Children's Mercy Park

August 27 26	Saint Louis FC	0–2	San Antonio FC	Fenton, MO
7:30 PM CDT		Report (USL)	Thurière 12'; Castillo 45+1'	Stadium: World Wide Technology Soccer Park; Attendance: 5,262

August 31 27	Saint Louis FC	1–1	Oklahoma City Energy	Fenton, MO
7:00 PM CDT		Report (STLFC); Report (USL)		Stadium: World Wide Technology Soccer Park; Attendance: 4,209

September 5 28	FC Cincinnati	2–1	Saint Louis FC	Cincinnati, OH
3:30 PM CDT	Okoli (yellow card) 58', (goal) 84', 90+4'	Report (STLFC); Report (USL)	Lurie (yellow card) 62'; Roberts (yellow card) 76'; Doody 86'	Stadium: Nippert Stadium; Attendance: 17,415; Referee: Joshua Brooks

September 10 29	San Antonio FC	1–3	Saint Louis FC	San Antonio, TX
7:30 PM CDT	Alvarez 32'; Morgan (yellow card) 42'; Bradnock-Brennan (yellow card) 90+4'	Report (STLFC); Report (USL)	Herrera 12', 16', 54'; Pais (yellow card) 86'	Stadium: Toyota Field; Attendance: 6,251; Referee: Luis Guardia

September 17 30	Saint Louis FC	1–5	Louisville City	Fenton, MO
7:30 PM CDT	Roberts 17'; Dixon (yellow card) 25'; Musa (red card) 35'; Ambersley (yellow card) 69'; David (yellow card) 75'	Report (STLFC); Report (USL)	Dacres 38'; Lancaster 40'; Rasmussen 51', 56'; Ilić 79'	Stadium: World Wide Technology Soccer Park; Attendance: 6,004

September 24 31	Oklahoma City Energy	2–2	Saint Louis FC	Oklahoma City, OK
6:00 PM CDT	Pitter 1'; König 26'; Craven (yellow card) 59'	Report (STLFC); Report (USL)	Roberts (yellow card) 15'; Tshuma 21'; David 23'	Stadium: Taft Stadium; Attendance: 5,712; Referee: Travis Haight

=== Standings ===
==== Western Conference Table ====
Pos	Team	Pld	W	D	L	GF	GA	GD	Pts
11	Real Monarchs	30	10	6	14	31	41	−10	36
12	Seattle Sounders 2	30	9	8	13	35	50	−15	35
13	Arizona United	30	9	7	14	40	46	−6	34
14	Saint Louis FC	30	8	10	12	42	44	−2	34
15	Tulsa Roughnecks	30	5	4	21	25	64	−39	19

Source: 2016 USL Standings
Rules for classification: 1) total wins; 2) total goal differential; 3) total goals scored; 4) points earned against top four Conference finishers; 5) disciplinary points; 6) coin toss or drawing of lots

== U.S. Open Cup ==
=== Matches ===
May 18 2nd Round	Saint Louis FC	2–0	AFC Cleveland	Fenton, MO
7:00 PM CDT	Takada (yellow card) 19'; Hardware 22'; Roberts 77'	Report (STLFC)	V. Bell (yellow card) 41'; McGivern (yellow card) 86'; Manfut (yellow card) 87'	Stadium: World Wide Technology Soccer Park; Attendance: 3,195

June 1 3rd Round	Saint Louis FC	0–2	Minnesota United	Fenton, MO
7:00 PM CDT	Cochran (yellow card) 45+1'	Report (STLFC)	Lowe (yellow card) 56'; Venegas 69'; Blake 90+3'	Stadium: World Wide Technology Soccer Park; Attendance: 2,065

== Player statistics ==
As of December 15, 2016

=== Goals ===
Place	Name	USL	USL Playoffs	U.S. Open Cup	Total
1	(El Salvador) Irvin Herrera	14	0	0	14
2	(United States) Vince Cicciarelli	5	0	0	5
2	(England) Jordan Roberts	4	0	1	5
4	(Zimbabwe) Schillo Tshuma	4	0	0	4
5	(New Zealand) James Musa	3	0	0	3
5	(Jamaica) Jamiel Hardware	2	0	1	3
7	(United States) Mike Ambersley	2	0	0	2
7	(United States) Chad Bond	2	0	0	2
7	(United States) Patrick Doody	2	0	0	2
7	(United States) Seth Rudolph	2	0	0	2
11	(United States) Tyler David	1	0	0	1
11	(United States) Sam Fink	1	0	0	1

=== Assists ===
Place	Name	USL	USL Playoffs	U.S. Open Cup	Total
1	(El Salvador) Irvin Herrera	4	0	0	4
2	(United States) Jason Plumhoff	3	0	0	3
2	(Jamaica) Richard Dixon	3	0	0	3
2	(United States) Mike Ambersley	3	0	0	3
2	(New Zealand) James Musa	3	0	0	3
6	(Jamaica) Jamiel Hardware	2	0	0	2
6	(United States) Chad Bond	2	0	0	2
6	(United States) A. J. Cochran	2	0	0	2
6	(Japan) Kentaro Takada	1	0	1	2
10	(England) Jordan Roberts	1	0	0	1
10	(United States) Tyler David	1	0	0	1
10	(United States) Brandon Barklage	1	0	0	1

=== Shutouts ===
Place	Name	USL	USL Playoffs	U.S. Open Cup	Total
1	(United States) Mark Pais	3	0	1	4
2	(Jamaica) Ryan Thompson	1	0	0	1
2	(United States) Patrick McLain	1	0	0	1

== Kit ==
Supplier: Nike / Sponsor: Electrical Connection, NECA/IBEW Local 1

Home	Away	Third	Goalkeeper 1	Goalkeeper 2
