= 2017 Saint Louis FC season =

Saint Louis FC
2017 season
- CEO: Jim Kavanaugh
- Head coach: Preki
- Top goalscorer: League: Christian Volesky (8); All: Christian Volesky (8)
- Highest home attendance: 5,566 (April 1 vs. Ottawa Fury)
- Lowest home attendance: 4,107 (April 22 vs. Charlotte Independence)
- Average home league attendance: 4,739
- Biggest win: 2–0 (June 2 vs. Toronto FC II)
- Biggest defeat: 0–4 (April 15 vs. FC Cincinnati)
Home colors	Away colors

The 2017 Saint Louis FC season was the franchise's third season in the United Soccer League, one of two leagues in the second division of soccer in the United States.

Due to the addition of new teams to the league, the club returned to the USL's Eastern Conference, where they had played during their inaugural 2015 season.

Additionally, the club announced the end of their affiliation with the Chicago Fire of Major League Soccer, which had been in place for their first two seasons.

== Roster ==
Where a player has not declared an international allegiance, nation is determined by place of birth.

As of June 4, 2017

No.	Position	Nation	Player
1	GK	USA	Devala Gorrick
2	MF	USA	Seth Rudolph
3	DF	USA	Aedan Stanley
4	DF	USA	A. J. Cochran
5	DF	POL	Konrad Plewa
6	DF	USA	Austin Ledbetter
7	MF	DEN	Sebastian Dalgaard
8	MF	MKD	Dragan Stojkov
9	FW	USA	Christian Volesky
11	MF	USA	Mats Bjurman
12	MF	USA	Tyler David
13	DF	USA	Matthew Sheldon
14	MF	ENG	Nick Radosavljevic
15	MF	USA	Matteo Kidd
16	MF	USA	Nikiphoros Vlastos
17	MF	MEX	Octavio Guzmán
18	MF	SRB	Ivan Mirković
19	FW	COL	José Angulo
20	DF	USA	Jack Maher
21	FW	USA	Max Alvarez
22	DF	USA	Wesley Charpie
23	DF	USA	Ryan Howe
24	MF	USA	Tony Walls
25	FW	SRB	Milan Petosevic
26	MF	SRB	Denis Ahmetović
28	MF	BIH	Emir Alihodžić
30	DF	CRC	Erick Cabalceta
31	GK	USA	Jack Filla
99	GK	USA	Adam Grinwis

Academy player

== Player movement ==
=== Returning players from 2016 ===
No.	Position	Player	Nation	Date Signed	Ref
10	Midfielder	Chad Bond	Wales	January 7, 2016	
—	Forward	Irvin Herrera	El Salvador	February 18, 2016	
4	Defender	A. J. Cochran	United States	March 6, 2016	
12	Midfielder	Tyler David	United States	March 6, 2016	
2	Midfielder	Seth Rudolph	United States	April 22, 2016	

=== New signings ===
No.	Position	Player	Nation	Previous Team	Date Signed	Ref
1	Goalkeeper	Devala Gorrick	United States	(United States) Colorado Springs Switchbacks	November 10, 2016	
18	Midfielder	Ivan Mirković	Serbia	(United States) Orange County Blues	November 10, 2016	
7	Midfielder	Sebastian Dalgaard	Denmark	(United States) Oklahoma City Energy	November 15, 2016	
13	Defender	Matthew Sheldon	United States	(United States) Orange County Blues	November 15, 2016	
11	Midfielder	Mats Bjurman	United States	(United States) Orange County Blues	November 22, 2016	
22	Defender	Wesley Charpie	United States	(Canada) Toronto FC II	November 22, 2016	
17	Midfielder	Octavio Guzmán	Mexico	(United States) Sacramento Republic	November 22, 2016	
30	Defender	Erick Cabalceta	Costa Rica	(Costa Rica) AD Carmelita	November 30, 2016	
19	Forward	José Angulo	Colombia	(United States) Fort Lauderdale Strikers	December 22, 2016	
8	Midfielder	Dragan Stojkov	(North Macedonia) Macedonia	(United States) Indy Eleven	January 5, 2017	
5	Defender	Konrad Plewa	Poland	(United States) New York Red Bulls II	January 27, 2017	
26	Midfielder	Denis Ahmetovic	Serbia	(Thailand) Ubon UMT United	February 20, 2017	
6	Defender	Austin Ledbetter	United States	(United States) Des Moines Menace (United States) SIU Edwardsville Cougars	February 20, 2017	
25	Forward	Milan Petosevic	Serbia	(Austria) Favoritner AC	February 20, 2017	
14	Midfielder	Nick Radosavljevic	England	(United States) Chico State Wildcats	February 20, 2017	
99	Goalkeeper	Adam Grinwis	United States	(United States) Rochester Rhinos	March 5, 2017	
23	Defender	Ryan Howe	United States	(United States) Ocean City Nor'easters (United States) Loyola Ramblers	March 5, 2017	
9	Forward	Christian Volesky	United States	(United States) Sporting Kansas City	March 6, 2017	
21	Forward	Max Alvarez	United States	(United States) Sacramento Republic	March 31, 2017	
31	Goalkeeper	Jack Filla	United States	(United States) UMSL Tritons	April 7, 2017	
24	Midfielder	Tony Walls	United States	(United States) Rochester Rhinos	April 22, 2017	
28	Midfielder	Emir Alihodžić	Bosnia and Herzegovina	(United States) Seattle Sounders 2	May 17, 2017	

=== Academy signings ===
No.	Position	Player	Nation	Previous Team	Date Signed	Ref
15	Midfielder	Matteo Kidd	United States	(United States) St. Louis Scott Gallagher	April 7, 2017	
20	Defender	Jack Maher	United States	(United States) St. Louis Scott Gallagher	April 7, 2017	
3	Defender	Aedan Stanley	United States	(United States) St. Louis Scott Gallagher	April 7, 2017	
16	Midfielder	Nikiphoros Vlastos	United States	(United States) St. Louis Scott Gallagher	April 7, 2017	

=== Loans ===
==== Out ====
No.	Position	Player	Nation	Loaned To	Date Loaned	Notes	Ref
—	Forward	Irvin Herrera	El Salvador	(United States) New York Cosmos	February 2, 2017	Season-long loan	

== United Soccer League season ==
=== Preseason ===
February 21	Ottawa Fury	2–1	Saint Louis FC	Bradenton, FL
5:00 PM CST	Seoane 51'; Williams 73'	Report	Kidd 70'	Stadium: IMG Academy
Note: Match played with three periods of 30 minutes each

February 22	D.C. United	3–0	Saint Louis FC	Clearwater, FL
3:00 PM CST	Kamara 20'; Le Toux 59'; Nyarko 88'	Report		Stadium: Joe DiMaggio Sports Complex

February 25	Orlando City SC	3–1	Saint Louis FC	Orlando, FL
4:00 PM CST	Kaká 4'; Larin 25', 35'	Report	Petosevic 89'	Stadium: Orlando City Stadium

February 27	United States U-17	1–2	Saint Louis FC	Bradenton, FL
9:00 AM CST	(First Half)		Rideout (First Half); Radosavljevic (First Half)	Stadium: IMG Academy

March 5	Oklahoma City Energy	0–0	Saint Louis FC	Springfield, MO
3:30 PM CST		Source		Stadium: Lake Country Soccer Complex

March 6	Saint Louis Billikens	1–0	Saint Louis FC	St. Louis, MO
7:00 PM CST	Jones (Second Half)	Source		Stadium: Robert R. Hermann Stadium

March 11	Swope Park Rangers	1–3	Saint Louis FC	Columbia, MO
1:00 PM CST	Duke 54'	Report	Guzmán 2', 43'; Bjurman 55'	Stadium: R. Marvin Owens Field

March 18	Tulsa Roughnecks	3–0	Saint Louis FC	St. Louis, MO
7:00 PM CDT	Svantesson 21'; Corrales 33'; Caffa 43'	Report		Stadium: Robert R. Hermann Stadium

March 19	SIU Edwardsville Cougars	1–1	Saint Louis FC	Edwardsville, IL
5:00 PM CDT	McLean 42'	Report	Ahmetovic 73'	Stadium: Ralph Korte Stadium

=== Results summary ===
Overall								Home						Away					
Pld	W	D	L	GF	GA	GD	Pts	W	D	L	GF	GA	GD	W	D	L	GF	GA	GD
32	9	9	14	34	44	−10	36	7	3	7	24	22	+2	2	6	7	10	22	−12

Source: Match reports

Round	1	2	3	4	5	6	7	8	9	10	11	12	13	14	15	16	17	18	19	20	21	22	23	24	25	26	27	28	29	30	31	32	33
Stadium	A	H	H	A	A	H	A	H	A	A	H	H	A	A	H	A	H	H	A	H	A	H	H	H	A	A	A	H	H	H	A	H	A
Result	D	W	W	W	L	L	D	P	L	D	W	L	L	L	D	L	W	L	W	D	L	W	L	W	L	D	D	L	W	D	L	L	D

Source: Match reports
A = Away; H = Home; W = Win; D = Draw; L = Loss; P = Postponed

=== Matches ===
March 25 01	Louisville City	0–0	Saint Louis FC	Louisville, KY
1:00 PM CDT	DelPiccolo (yellow card) 42'; Spencer (yellow card) 90+3'	Report (USL)	Stojkov (yellow card) 50'; Gorrick (yellow card) 55'; Sheldon (yellow card) 56'; Mirković (yellow card) 89'	Stadium: Louisville Slugger Field; Attendance: 6,758; Referee: Calin Radosav

April 1 02	Saint Louis FC	3–2	Ottawa Fury	Fenton, MO
7:30 PM CDT	Volesky 5'; Bjurman 9'; Alvarez (yellow card) 80'; Manesio 88' (o.g.)	Report (USL)	Edward 11'; Obasi 83'; Del Campo (yellow card) 85'; Campbell (yellow card) 90'; McEleney (red card) 90+4'	Stadium: World Wide Technology Soccer Park; Attendance: 5,566; Referee: Dule Djurasevic

April 8 03	Saint Louis FC	3–2	New York Red Bulls II	Fenton, MO
7:30 PM CDT	Volesky 3'; Stojkov (yellow card) 69'; Angulo 74' (pen.); Rudolph 84'	Report (USL)	Allen 52'; Bezecourt 58'; Metzger (yellow card) 65'; Schmoll (yellow card) 73'	Stadium: World Wide Technology Soccer Park; Attendance: 4,807; Referee: Greg Dopka

April 12 04	Pittsburgh Riverhounds	1–2	Saint Louis FC	Pittsburgh, PA
6:00 PM CDT	Banjo 5'	Report (USL)	Angulo 30'; Howe (yellow card) 42'; Volesky 67'	Stadium: Highmark Stadium; Attendance: 3,083; Referee: Lucas Feathers

April 15 05	FC Cincinnati	4–0	Saint Louis FC	Cincinnati, OH
6:00PM EST	Fall 35', 45+2', 48', 62'; Mansaray (yellow card) 39'	Report (USL)	David (yellow card) 39'; Guzman (yellow card) 64'	Stadium: Nippert Stadium; Attendance: 23,144; Referee: Brandon Artis

April 22 06	Saint Louis FC	1–2	Charlotte Independence	Fenton, MO
7:30 PM CDT	Angulo 4'; Walls (yellow card) 59'; Ledbetter (yellow card) 71'; Cochran (yellow card) 85'	Report (USL)	Martínez 8', 29', (yellow card) 70'; Johnson (yellow card) 78'	Stadium: World Wide Technology Soccer Park; Attendance: 4,107; Referee: Guido Gonzalez

April 27 07	Orlando City B	0–0	Saint Louis FC	Orlando, FL
6:30 PM CDT	Da Silva (yellow card) 53'	Report (USL)	Plewa (yellow card) 52'; David (yellow card) 70'	Stadium: Orlando City Stadium; Attendance: 1,008; Referee: Caleb Mendez

May 6	Saint Louis FC	Postponed	Rochester Rhinos	Fenton, MO
7:30 PM CDT				Stadium: World Wide Technology Soccer Park
Note: Postponed due to flooding of World Wide Technology Soccer Park, rescheduled for July 5

May 13 08	Charleston Battery	1–0	Saint Louis FC	Charleston, SC
6:00 PM CDT	Lasso 62'; Anunga (yellow card) 68'	Report (USL)	Bjurman (yellow card) 38'; Stojkov (yellow card) 90+3'	Stadium: MUSC Health Stadium; Attendance: 2,015; Referee: Henrik Karlsson

May 27 09	Tampa Bay Rowdies	1–1	Saint Louis FC	St. Petersburg, FL
6:30 PM CDT	Fernandes (yellow card) 6'; Morrell (yellow card) 39'; King (yellow card) 56'; Nanchoff (yellow card) 76'; Mkandawire (yellow card) 82'; Collins 87'	Report (USL)	Charpie (yellow card) 12'; Alihodžić (yellow card) 41'; Plewa (yellow card) 54'; Angulo 59'	Stadium: Al Lang Stadium; Attendance: 6,068; Referee: Danielle Chesky

June 2 10	Saint Louis FC	2–0	Toronto FC II	Fenton, MO
7:30 PM CDT	Cochran 23'; Volesky 49'; Angulo (yellow card) 64'	Report (USL)		Stadium: World Wide Technology Soccer Park; Attendance: 4,477; Referee: Juan Guzman Jr.

June 11 11	Saint Louis FC	1–2	Bethlehem Steel	Fenton, MO
4:00 PM CDT	Tribbett 3' (o.g.); Alihodžić (yellow card) 31'; Stojkov (yellow card) 50'; Plewa (yellow card) 53'; Cabalceta (yellow card) 86'	Report (USL)	Jones (yellow card) 42'; Conneh 56'; Chambers (yellow card) 68' (goal) 74'	Stadium: World Wide Technology Soccer Park; Attendance: 4,016; Referee: Lukasz Szpala

June 24 12	FC Cincinnati	2–0	Saint Louis FC	Cincinnati, OH
6:00 PM CDT	Cochran 7' (o.g.); Djiby (yellow card) 52'; König 66'	Report	Guzmán (yellow card) 28'; Cabalceta (yellow card) 50'; Cochran (yellow card) 72'; Charpie (yellow card) 86'	Stadium: Nippert Stadium; Attendance: 20,125; Referee: Victor Rivas

July 1 13	New York Red Bulls II	1–0	Saint Louis FC	Montclair, NJ
3:00 PM CDT	Allen 26', (yellow card) 56'; Kutler (yellow card) 32'; Basuljevic (yellow card) 43'	Report		Stadium: MSU Soccer Park at Pittser Field; Attendance: 611; Referee: Jorge Ramírez
Note: Rescheduled from July 2 to accommodate other schedule changes

July 5 14	Saint Louis FC	0–0	Rochester Rhinos	Fenton, MO
7:00 PM CDT	Sheldon (yellow card) 66'	Report	Lee (yellow card) 60'	Stadium: World Wide Technology Soccer Park; Attendance: 4,634; Referee: Dule Djurasevic
Note: Rescheduled from May 6 due to flooding of World Wide Technology Soccer Park

July 8 15	Charlotte Independence	5–1	Saint Louis FC	Matthews, NC
6:00 PM CDT	Herrera 14', 30', 61' (pen.); E. Martínez 39', (yellow card) 46'; Davidson (yellow card) 50'; Duckett 78'; Hilton (yellow card) 83'	Report	Guzman 57'; Stanley (yellow card) 59'; Dalgaard (yellow card) 77'; Alihodžić (red card) 85'	Stadium: Mecklenburg County Sportsplex; Attendance: 1,637; Referee: Jose Lara

July 15 16	Saint Louis FC	1–0	Charleston Battery	Fenton, MO
7:30 PM CDT	Plewa (yellow card) 40'; Sheldon (yellow card) 45+1'; Guzmán 72'; David (yellow card) 90'	Report	Cordovés (yellow card) 9'; Higashi (yellow card) 53'; Griffith (yellow card) 89'	Stadium: World Wide Technology Soccer Park; Attendance: 5,243; Referee: Mark Kadlecik

July 22 17	Saint Louis FC	1–4	Louisville City	Fenton, MO
7:30 PM CDT	Bjurman (yellow card) 31'; Jackson 42'; Volesky (red card) 48'; David (yellow card) 54'; Petosevic (yellow card) 59'	Report	Kaye (yellow card) 28'; Jimenez (yellow card) 37', (goal) 52'; Craig 57'; Spencer 82'; Lancaster 86'	Stadium: World Wide Technology Soccer Park; Attendance: 4,310; Referee: Henrik Karlsson

July 29 18	Richmond Kickers	0–1	Saint Louis FC	Richmond, VA
6:00 PM CDT	Oliver 46', (yellow card) 58'; Luiz Fernando 47'; Asante 87'; Wyatt (yellow card) 90'	Report	Jones 39'; Tribbett 69'; Marquez (yellow card) 76'	Stadium: City Stadium; Attendance: 2,921; Referee: Danielle Chesky

August 5 19	Saint Louis FC	0–0	Swope Park Rangers	Fenton, MO
7:30 PM CDT	Mirkovic (yellow card) 27'; Sheldon (yellow card) 57'; Plewa (yellow card) 90+4'	Report	Didic (yellow card) 56'; MacLeod (yellow card) 63'	Stadium: World Wide Technology Soccer Park; Attendance: 4,433; Referee: Ismir Pekmic

August 10 20	Tulsa Roughnecks	2–1	Saint Louis FC	Tulsa, OK
7:30 PM CDT	Corrales 25'; Calistri 70'; Bronico (yellow card) 77'	Report	Mirković (yellow card) 30'; Jadama 86' (o.g.)	Stadium: ONEOK Field; Attendance: 3,027; Referee: Luis Guardia

August 13 21	Saint Louis FC	4–3	Tampa Bay Rowdies	Fenton, MO
6:00 PM CDT	Jackson 1'; Rudolph 5', 67'; Ledbetter (yellow card) 38'; Petosevic (yellow card) 68'; Plewa 89'	Report	Schäfer 10'; Hristov 16', (yellow card) 28'; Lowe (yellow card) 25', (yellow card) 85' (red card); Paterson 36', (yellow card) 36'	Stadium: World Wide Technology Soccer Park; Attendance: 4,001; Referee: Gustavo Solorio

August 19 22	Saint Louis FC	1–2	Pittsburgh Riverhounds	Fenton, MO
7:30 PM CDT	Rudolph 45'; Volesky (yellow card) 45+2'; Grinwis (yellow card) 72'; Walls (yellow card) 79'	Report	Adewole (yellow card) 45+1'; Hertzog 47', 73' (pen.), (yellow card) 90+1'; Souto (yellow card) 51'; Mitchell (yellow card) 65'; Jack (yellow card) 85'	Stadium: World Wide Technology Soccer Park; Attendance: 4,703; Referee: Lorant Varga

August 23 23	Saint Louis FC	2–1	Tulsa Roughnecks	Fenton, MO
7:00 PM CDT	Bjurman 55'; Stojkov (yellow card) 82'; Rudolph 90'	Report	Calistri 43'; Jadama (yellow card) 70', (yellow card) 78' (red card)	Stadium: World Wide Technology Soccer Park; Attendance: 4,152; Referee: Charles Murphy

August 26 24	Rochester Rhinos	2–1	Saint Louis FC	Rochester, NY
5:05 PM CDT	Fall 7' (pen.); Graf 55'	Report	Howe 3', (yellow card) 74'; Rudolph (red card) 6'; Alihodžić (yellow card) 26'; Ledbetter (yellow card) 90+1'	Stadium: Capelli Sport Stadium; Attendance: 1,607; Referee: Lucasz Szpala

August 30 25	Toronto FC II	1–1	Saint Louis FC	Vaughan, ON
6:30 PM CDT	McCrary (yellow card) 80'; Hundal 90+3'; Telfer (yellow card) 90+4'		Plewa (yellow card) 8'; Volesky 39'; Ledbetter (yellow card) 56'; Mirković (yellow card) 90+4'	Stadium: Ontario Soccer Centre; Attendance: 647; Referee: David Barrie

September 3 26	Ottawa Fury	2–2	Saint Louis FC	Ottawa, ON
1:00 PM CDT	Dos Santos (yellow card) 28', (goal) 88' (pen.); Del Campo (yellow card) 33'; Barden 38'	Report	Volesky (yellow card) 61'; Rudolph 65'; Petosevic 78'	Stadium: TD Place Stadium; Attendance: 4,059; Referee: Yusri Rudolf

September 9 27	Saint Louis FC	1–2	Harrisburg City Islanders	Fenton, MO
7:30 PM CDT	Charpie (yellow card) 50'; Plewa (yellow card) 59'; Mirković (yellow card) 60'; Volesky 70'	Report	Bond 32'; Ribeiro (yellow card) 72' (goal) 90+3'	Stadium: World Wide Technology Soccer Park; Attendance: 4,133; Referee: Rosendo Mendoza

September 16 28	Saint Louis FC	2–0	Orlando City B	Fenton, MO
7:30 PM CDT	Howe 10'; Cochran (yellow card) 42'; Ledbetter (yellow card) 49', (yellow card) 54' (red card); Volesky 62' (pen.); Charpie (yellow card) 90+4'	Report	Thomsen (yellow card) 89' da Silva (yellow card) 90'; Neal (yellow card) 90+2'	Stadium: World Wide Technology Soccer Park; Attendance: 4,456; Referee: Danielle Chesky

September 23 29	Saint Louis FC	2–2	FC Cincinnati	Fenton, MO
7:30 PM CDT	Rudolph 42'; Volesky 59' (pen.); Stojkov (yellow card) 87'; Radosavljevic (red card) 90+5'	Report	Greig (yellow card) 41'; Bone 70'; König 90+5' (pen.)	Stadium: World Wide Technology Soccer Park; Attendance: 4,376; Referee: Ismir Pekmic

September 30 30	Harrisburg City Islanders	2–0	Saint Louis FC	Harrisburg, PA
6:00 PM CDT	Sanchez 4'; Dabo (yellow card) 20'; Calvano (yellow card) 51'; Ribeiro (yellow card) 54'; Mensah 75' (yellow card) 88'	Report	Appiah (yellow card) 38'; Mirković (yellow card) 88'	Stadium: FNB Field; Attendance: 3,017; Referee: Daniel Gutierrez

October 7 31	Saint Louis FC	0–1	Richmond Kickers	Fenton, MO
7:30 PM CDT	Charpie (yellow card) 60'; Cabalceta (yellow card) 78'	Report	Bolduc 46', (yellow card) 90'	Stadium: World Wide Technology Soccer Park; Attendance: 5,725; Referee: Eric Tattersall

October 15 32	Bethlehem Steel	1–1	Saint Louis FC	Bethlehem, PA
2:00 PM CDT	Aaronson (yellow card) 6'; Real 35'; Chambers (yellow card) 54'; Moar (yellow card) 80'; Burke (yellow card) 90+2'	Report	Dalgaard 34'; Plewa (yellow card) 46'; Mirkovic (yellow card) 64'; Rudolph (yellow card) 78'	Stadium: Goodman Stadium; Attendance: 3,010; Referee: Greg Dopka

=== Standings ===
==== Eastern Conference Table ====
Pos	Team	Pld	W	D	L	GF	GA	GD	Pts
10	Ottawa Fury	32	8	14	10	42	41	+1	38
11	Harrisburg City Islanders	32	10	7	15	28	47	−19	37
12	Saint Louis FC	32	9	9	14	35	48	−13	36
13	Pittsburgh Riverhounds	32	8	12	12	33	42	−9	36
14	Richmond Kickers	32	8	8	16	24	36	−12	32

Source: 2017 USL standings
Rules for classification: 1) total wins; 2) total goal differential; 3) total goals scored; 4) points earned against top four Conference finishers; 5) disciplinary points; 6) coin toss or drawing of lots

== U.S. Open Cup ==
=== Matches ===
May 17 2nd Round	FC Wichita	3–4 (a.e.t.)	Saint Louis FC	Wichita, KS
7:00 PM CDT	Sosa 7' (pen.), (yellow card) 64'; Serfaty (yellow card) 55'; Gurson 62', (yellow card) 85'; Lemons (yellow card) 69'; Corfe 81'; Haskin (red card) 90+1'; Anelli (yellow card) 90+7'; Clare (yellow card) 115'	Report (ESPN)	Gorrick (yellow card) 5'; Cochran 33'; Alihodžić (yellow card) 42'; Angulo 72', 95'; Howe (yellow card) 77'; Ledbetter (yellow card) 85'; David 90+5'; Bjurman (yellow card) 108'; Ahmetovic (yellow card) 118'	Stadium: Stryker Soccer Complex; Attendance: 1,432

May 30 3rd Round	Michigan Bucks	1–2	Saint Louis FC	Pontiac, MI
7:00 PM CDT	Atuahene 46'	Report (ESPN)	Dalgaard 13', 16', (yellow card) 71'; Guzmán (yellow card) 77'	Stadium: Ultimate Soccer Arenas

June 14 4th Round	Saint Louis FC	0–1	Chicago Fire	Fenton, MO
7:30 PM CDT	Guzmán (yellow card) 29'; Stojkov (yellow card) 68' (yellow-red card) 81'	Report (ESPN)	Solignac 27'; McCarty (yellow card) 43'; Juninho (yellow card) 71'; Vincent (yellow card) 85'	Stadium: World Wide Technology Soccer Park; Attendance: 5,786; Referee: Jon Freemon
