= 2022 North Texas SC season =

North Texas SC
2022 season
- Owner: FC Dallas (Clark and Dan Hunt)
- Chairman: Matt Denny
- Head coach: Pa-Modou Kah
- Stadium: Choctaw Stadium
- MLSNP: 4th place Western Conference
- MLSNP Cup Playoffs: Western Conference Semi-Finals
- Top goalscorer: League: Bernard Kamungo; All: Bernard Kamungo
- Highest home attendance: 1,957 (3/26) vs Minnesota United FC 2
- Lowest home attendance: 683 (9/11) vs St. Louis City SC 2
- Average home league attendance: 931 (3 missing)
- Biggest win: North Texas SC 4–0 Minnesota United FC 2 (6/22)
- Biggest defeat: Sporting Kansas City II 4–2 North Texas SC (7/2)
Home colors	Away colors

The 2022 North Texas SC season was the club's fourth season. The first three seasons North Texas SC competed in USL League One, including their championship year in the inaugural 2019 season. In December 2021, North Texas SC announced that they would compete in the inaugural MLS Next Pro season, a new division three league in American soccer.

== Staff ==
Position	Name
General manager	(England) Matt Denny
Head coach	(Norway) Pa-Modou Kah
Assistant coach	(Brazil) Michel
Assistant coach	(Canada) Vikram Virk

== Players ==
As of June 16, 2022

No.	Pos.	Nation	Player
1	GK	BRA	Felipe Carneiro de Souza
4	DF	CAN	Paul Bello Amedume (on loan from Pacific FC)
5	DF	USA	Chase Niece
6	MF	POR	Tomás Lacerda
7	MF	USA	Bernard Kamungo
8	MF	USA	Blaine Ferri
9	FW	COL	José Mulato (on loan from Deportivo Cali)
10	FW	GHA	Hope Avayevu
11	MF	BRA	Andre Costa
12	DF	USA	Blake Pope
13	GK	USA	Antonio Carrera (on loan from Alverca)
15	DF	USA	Isaiah Parker
16	MF	HAI	Carl Sainté
17	FW	BRA	Luis Cordosa Santos
18	DF	USA	Derek Waldeck
20	MF	USA	Alejandro Araneda
22	FW	USA	Pablo Torre
25	FW	USA	Collin Smith
26	DF	USA	Lucas Bartlett
30	GK	USA	Seth Wilson
42	DF	USA	Nolan Norris
43	DF	JAM	Tarik Scott
45	DF	USA	Will Baker
47	MF	USA	Jared Aguilar
51	MF	JAM	Malachi Molina
52	GK	USA	Fabian Enriquez
53	MF	USA	Alejandro Urzua
60	GK	USA	Elliot Finley
61	MF	USA	Michael Morales
65	MF	USA	Dylan Lacy
68	MF	USA	Santiago Ferreira

Signed to first team contract with FC Dallas.
FC Dallas Academy player.

== Competitive fixtures ==
=== MLS Next Pro Regular Season ===
March 26, 2022 1	North Texas SC	3–1	Minnesota United FC 2	Arlington, TX
8:00 PM CDT	Amedume (yellow card) 13'; Waldeck 38'; Smith (yellow card) 65'; Scott 78', 89'; Ferri (yellow card) 90+3'	Report	Hayes (yellow card) 16'; Mendonca (yellow card) 44'; Jackson (yellow card) 54'; McMaster 64' (yellow card) 85'; Oluwaseyi (yellow card) 82'; Montgomery (yellow card) 88'	Stadium: Choctaw Stadium; Attendance: 1,957; Referee: Gloria Resendiz

April 2, 2022 2	Tacoma Defiance	1–1 (5–6 SO)	North Texas SC	Tukwila, WA
9:00 PM CDT	Ocampo-Chavez 27'; Mendoza (yellow card) 89'	Report	Kamungo 70'	Stadium: Starfire Sports Complex; Referee: Christopher Calderon
	Shootout
	Adeniran (penalty missed); M. Vargas (penalty scored); Leyva (penalty scored); Teves (penalty scored); Mendoza (penalty scored); Uderitz (penalty scored); Kitahara (penalty missed)		(penalty scored) Waldeck; (penalty missed) Pope; (penalty scored) Smith; (penalty scored) Cardoso; (penalty scored) Kamungo; (penalty scored) Bartlett; (penalty scored) Parker

April 10, 2022 3	North Texas SC	3–1	Colorado Rapids 2	Arlington, TX
4:00 PM CDT	Waldeck (yellow card) 18'; Ferri 45+1' (pen.) (yellow card) 82'; Avayevu 52'; Niece (yellow card) 61'; Kamungo 77'; Smith (yellow card) 83'; Costa (yellow card) 84'	Report	Yapi (yellow card) 15'; Toure 35'; Mayaka (yellow card) 73'; Legendre (yellow card) 82'	Stadium: Choctaw Stadium; Referee: Elijio Arreguin

April 17, 2022 4	San Jose Earthquakes II	0–1	North Texas SC	San Jose, CA
7:00 PM CDT	Walls (yellow card) 24'	Report	Ferri (yellow card) 11'; Kamungo 80'; Pope (yellow card) 89'	Stadium: PayPal Park; Referee: Malik Badawi

April 23, 2022 5	North Texas SC	2–3	Houston Dynamo 2	Frisco, TX
5:00 PM CDT	Costa 17'; Avayevu (yellow card) 22'; Ferreira (yellow card) 40'; Mulato 54'; Smith (yellow card) 74'; Waldeck (yellow card) 80'	Report	Gonzales 21'; Maples 45+3'; Avila 84'; Miller (yellow card) 90+1'	Stadium: Toyota Stadium (Texas); Attendance: 15,792; Referee: Lorenzo Hernandez

May 1, 2022 6	Sporting Kansas City II	0–2	North Texas SC	Lawrence, KS
7:00 PM CDT	Davis (red card) 44'; Hernández (yellow card) 45'; Michaeli (yellow card) 66'	Report	Kamungo 17' (yellow card) 58'; Avayevu (yellow card) 25'; Amendume (yellow card) 39'; Bartlett (yellow card) 66'; Torre 76' (yellow card) 89'	Stadium: Rock Chalk Park; Referee: Nabil Bensalah

May 8, 2022 7	North Texas SC	1–1 (2–4 SO)	Tacoma Defiance	Arlington, TX
4:00 PM CDT	Amedume 49'; Parker (yellow card) 57' (yellow-red card) 60'; Norris (yellow card) 74'	Report	Robin (yellow card) 31' (goal) 69'; Mendoza (yellow card) 48'	Stadium: Choctaw Stadium; Referee: Eric Tattersall
	Shootout
	Costa (penalty missed); Waldeck (penalty scored); Smith (penalty missed); Pope (penalty scored)		(penalty scored) Vargas; (penalty scored) Ovalle; (penalty scored) Mendoza; (penalty scored) Uderitz

May 14, 2022 8	North Texas SC	1–0	Whitecaps FC 2	Arlington, TX
8:00 PM CDT	Ferreira (yellow card) 26'; Mulato 35'; Amedume (yellow card) 39'; Waldeck (yellow card) 47'; Carneiro (yellow card) 90'; Niece (yellow card) 90+8'	Report	Aguilar (yellow card) 26'; Fry (yellow card) 46'; Herdman (yellow card) 71'	Stadium: Choctaw Stadium; Attendance: 808; Referee: Abdou Ndiaye

May 20, 2022 9	Real Monarchs	0–3	North Texas SC	Herriman, UT
8:00 PM CDT	Mafwenta (yellow card) 63'; Kayondo (yellow card) 68'; Garcia (yellow card) 90+2'	Report	Kamungo 20'; Avayevu 56'; Torre 73'	Stadium: Zions Bank Stadium; Attendance: 3,132

June 4, 2022 10	Colorado Rapids 2	1–3	North Texas SC	Denver, CO
8:00 PM CDT	Yapi 5'; Walent (yellow card) 18'	Report	Avayevu 7'; Costa (yellow card) 27'; Kamungo 36' (pen.); Smith 50'; Pope (yellow card) 53'; Ferreira (yellow card) 85'; Bartlett (yellow card) 90+6'	Stadium: University of Denver Soccer Stadium; Referee: Michael Zapata

June 11, 2022 11	North Texas SC	2–1	Portland Timbers 2	Arlington, TX
8:00 PM CDT	Mulato 12'; Kamungo 19' (pen.); Pope (yellow card) 64'; Torre (yellow card) 90'; Santos (yellow card) 90+5'	Report	Peters 43'; Hinestroza (yellow card) 47'	Stadium: Choctaw Stadium; Attendance: 1,198; Referee: Josiah Parke

Jun 17, 2022 12	Whitecaps FC 2	3–1	North Texas SC	Burnaby, British Columbia, Canada
9:00 PM CDT	Collomb 46', 71'; Becher 82' (pen.), (yellow card) 87'	Report	Ferri (yellow card) 20'; Araneda (yellow card) 31'; Cardoso 64'; Parker (yellow card) 72'; Carneiro (yellow card) 81'	Stadium: Swangard Stadium; Referee: David Schmidt-Schweda

June 26, 2022 13	North Texas SC	4–0	Minnesota United FC 2	Arlington, TX
7:30 PM CDT	Mulato 39'; Araneda (yellow card) 44'; Kamungo 55'; Santos 59'; Smith 81'	Report		Stadium: Choctaw Stadium; Attendance: 748; Referee: Edgar García

July 2, 2022 14	Sporting Kansas City II	4–2	North Texas SC	Lawrence, KS
7:00 PM CDT	Salifu 37', 45+1', 51', 70' (yellow card) 71'; Fernandez (yellow card) 62'; Vázquez (yellow card) 78'	Report	Kamungo 15'; Pope (yellow card) 44'; Torre 70'; Costa (yellow card) 90'	Stadium: Rock Chalk Park; Referee: Alyssa Nichols

July 10, 2022 15	North Texas SC	1–3	San Jose Earthquakes II	Arlington, TX
7:30 PM CDT	Avayeyu (yellow card) 14' (yellow-red card) 45+3'; Parker 18'; Costa (yellow card) 76'; Amedume (yellow card) 86'	Report	Blancas 35', 51' (yellow card) 37'; Carrillo (yellow card) 63'; Richmond 83' (pen.); Ayon (yellow card) 86'; Scott (yellow card) 87'	Stadium: Choctaw Stadium; Attendance: 778; Referee: Emma Richards

July 15, 2022 16	North Texas SC	3–3 (4–5 SO)	Houston Dynamo 2	Arlington, TX
8:00 PM CDT	Mulato 36', 84' (yellow card) 90+2'; Parker (yellow card) 38'; Lacerda 66'; Smith (yellow card) 70'	Report	LeFlore 5', 47'; Palomino 24' (pen.) dos Santos Silva (yellow card) 51'	Stadium: Choctaw Stadium; Attendance: 818; Referee: Brad Jensen
	Shootout
	Torre (penalty scored); Cordosa Santos (penalty scored); Pope (penalty scored); Mulato (penalty missed); Kamungo (penalty scored); Amedume (penalty missed)		(penalty scored) Edwards; (penalty scored) Gonzalez; (penalty scored) Evans; (penalty missed) Herrera; (penalty scored) Ndoye; (penalty scored) Maples

July 22, 2022 17	St. Louis City SC 2	2–0	North Texas SC	Edwardsville, IL
7:00 PM CDT	Dias 39' (pen.); Kuzain 70'	Report	Urzua (yellow card) 35'; Avayeyu (yellow card) 60'; Cardoso (yellow card) 69'; Norris (yellow card) 84'; Smith (yellow card) 90'	Stadium: Ralph Korte Stadium

July 31, 2022 18	North Texas SC	3–0	Sporting Kansas City II	Arlington, TX
7:30 PM CDT	Kamungo 7', 68'; Smith (yellow card) 35'; Mulato 56'; Costa (yellow card) 61'; Lacerda (yellow card) 72'	Report	Kellman (yellow card) 50'; Michaeli (yellow card) 82'	Stadium: Choctaw Stadium; Attendance: 693; Referee: Brandon Queri

August 7, 2022 19	Portland Timbers 2	2–2 (7–6 SO)	North Texas SC	Hillsboro, OR
9:00 PM CDT	Miscic 59'; Jome 74'; Griffith (yellow card) 89'	Report	Avayeyu 14'; Parker (yellow card) 40'; Kamungo 49'	Stadium: Hillsboro Stadium; Referee: Corbyn May
	Shootout
	McCartney (penalty scored); Vivas (penalty scored); Peters (penalty scored); Bravo (penalty scored); Miscic (penalty scored); Rasmussen (penalty scored); Jome (penalty scored)		(penalty scored) Roberts; (penalty scored) Pope; (penalty scored) Cardoso; (penalty scored) Smith; (penalty scored) Kamungo; (penalty scored) Costa; (penalty missed) Amedume

August 12, 2022 20	North Texas SC	4–0	Real Monarchs	Arlington, TX
8:00 PM CDT	Aguilar (yellow card) 29'; Smith (yellow card) 60'; Mulato (penalty scored) 63'; Avayeyu (yellow card) 37', (goal) 70'; Kamungo (penalty scored) 80'; Torres 90'	Report	Kayondo (yellow card) 39'; Reedy (yellow card) 80'	Stadium: Choctaw Stadium; Attendance: 693; Referee: Luis Guardia

August 21, 2022 21	Colorado Rapids 2	1–1 (0–3 SO)	North Texas SC	Commerce City, CO
9:00 PM CDT	Amadou (yellow card) 45+2'; Priso-Mbongue (yellow card) 66'; Edwards 90+2'	Report	Costa 88'; Aguilar (yellow card) 90+2'	Stadium: Dick's Sporting Goods Park; Referee: Joshua Belzer
	Shootout
	Priso-Mbongue (penalty missed); Aguirre (penalty missed); Gómez (penalty missed)		(penalty scored) Cardoso; (penalty scored) Sainté; (penalty scored) Pope

September 3, 2022 22	Minnesota United FC 2	1–2	North Texas SC	Saint Paul, MN
6:00 PM CDT	Fisher (yellow card) 38'; Jackson 49'; Gutiérrez (yellow card) 63'	Report	Kamungo 12'; Mulato (yellow card) 45+1'; Smith (yellow card) 46'; Parker 55'; Carrera (yellow card) 90+1'	Stadium: Allianz Field; Referee: Gabriele Giusti

September 11, 2022 23	North Texas SC	3–1	St. Louis City SC 2	Arlington, TX
7:30 PM CDT	Kamungo 9', 76'; Mulato 19'; Norris (yellow card) 43'; Avayevu (yellow card) 48'; Bartlett (yellow card) 52'; Sainté (yellow card) 78'	Report	Awuah (yellow card) 27'; Pompeu (yellow card) 44'; Di Rosa (yellow card) 63'; D. Armstrong 85'; Palazzolo (yellow card) 87'	Stadium: Choctaw Stadium; Attendance: 683; Referee: Mark Allatin

September 18, 2022 24	Houston Dynamo 2	2–0	North Texas SC	Houston, TX
6:00 PM CDT	Raines (yellow card) 26'; Palomino 46'; Castilla 67', (yellow card) 74'; Avila (yellow card) 72'; Evans (yellow card) 77'	Report	Baker (yellow card) 38'; Ferri (yellow card) 45+1'; Sainté (yellow card) 46'; Lacerda (yellow card) 87'; Smith (yellow card) 90+5'	Stadium: AVEVA Stadium; Referee: John Matto

=== MLS Next Pro play-offs ===
September 25, 2022 Conference Semi-Finals	St. Louis City SC 2	2–0	North Texas SC	Edwardsville, IL
6:30 PM CDT	Yaro (yellow card) 41'; Ostrák 73'; Schneider (yellow card) 75'; Di Rosa (yellow card) 84'; Pompeu 90+1' (pen.)	Report	Sainté (yellow card) 39'; Scott (yellow card) 71'; Bartlett (yellow card) 90+1'	Stadium: Ralph Korte Stadium; Referee: Ricardo Fierro

==== Standings — Western Conference ====
Pos	Div	Team	Pld	W	SOW	SOL	L	GF	GA	GD	Pts	Qualification
1	FR	St. Louis City 2	24	15	1	2	6	51	34	+17	49	Qualification for the 2022 MLS Next Pro Playoffs
2	PC	Tacoma Defiance	24	14	3	1	6	57	25	+32	49	Qualification for the 2022 MLS Next Pro Playoffs
3	FR	Houston Dynamo 2	24	14	2	3	5	38	22	+16	49	Qualification for the 2022 MLS Next Pro Playoffs
4	FR	North Texas SC	24	13	2	3	6	48	31	+17	46	Qualification for the 2022 MLS Next Pro Playoffs
5	PC	San Jose Earthquakes II	24	12	1	3	8	48	37	+11	41	
6	FR	Minnesota United FC 2	24	9	4	1	10	43	39	+4	36	
7	PC	Whitecaps FC 2	24	7	3	5	9	40	40	0	32	
8	FR	Sporting Kansas City II	24	9	1	2	12	31	38	−7	31	
9	FR	Colorado Rapids 2	24	7	4	2	11	33	56	−23	31	
10	PC	Real Monarchs	24	6	1	3	14	28	50	−22	23	
11	PC	Portland Timbers 2	24	2	4	0	18	29	66	−37	14	

Source: MLSNP Western Conference
Rules for classification: 1) points; 2) total wins; 3) total goal differential; 4) total goals scored; 5) fewer disciplinary points; 6) away goal differential; 7) away goals scored; 8) home goals differential; 9) home goals scored; 10) coin toss (2 clubs tied) or drawing of lots (≥3 clubs tied)

== Statistics ==
Numbers after plus-sign(+) denote appearances as a substitute.

=== Appearances and goals ===
No.	Pos	Nat	Player	Total		MLS Next Pro		MLSNP Playoffs	
No.	Pos	Nat	Player	Apps	Goals	Apps	Goals	Apps	Goals
1	GK	(Brazil) BRA	Felipe Carneiro de Souza	7	0	7+0	0	0+0	0
4	DF	(Canada) CAN	Paul Amedume	18	1	17+1	1	0+0	0
5	DF	(United States) USA	Chase Niece	12	0	8+4	0	0+0	0
6	MF	(Portugal) POR	Tomas Jesus Baptista Pinheiro de Lacerda	17	1	7+10	1	0+0	0
7	MF	(United States) USA	Bernard Kamungo	25	16	22+2	16	1+0	0
8	MF	(United States) USA	Blaine Ferri	19	1	14+4	1	1+0	0
9	FW	(Colombia) COL	José Mulato	21	9	18+3	9	0+0	0
10	FW	(Ghana) GHA	Hope Avayevu	23	5	21+1	5	1+0	0
11	MF	(Brazil) BRA	Andre Costa	23	2	15+7	2	1+0	0
12	DF	(United States) USA	Blake Pope	24	0	13+10	0	0+1	0
13	GK	(United States) USA	Antonio Carrera	16	0	16+0	0	0+0	0
14	GK	(United States) USA	Jimmy Maurer	5	0	4+0	0	1+0	0
15	DF	(United States) USA	Isaiah Parker	23	2	22+0	2	1+0	0
16	MF	(Haiti) HAI	Carl Fred Sainté	5	0	3+1	0	1+0	0
17	FW	(Brazil) BRA	Luis Cordosa Santos	21	2	5+15	2	0+1	0
18	DF	(United States) USA	Derek Waldeck	12	1	8+4	1	0+0	0
20	MF	(United States) USA	Alejandro Araneda	13	0	8+5	0	0+0	0
22	FW	(United States) USA	Pablo Torre	17	4	3+13	4	0+1	0
24	MF	(United States) USA	Rio Ramirez	1	0	0+1	0	0+0	0
25	FW	(United States) USA	Collin Smith	24	2	18+5	2	1+0	0
26	DF	(United States) USA	Lucas Bartlett	13	0	12+0	0	1+0	0
30	GK	(United States) USA	Seth Wilson	0	0	0+0	0	0+0	0
42	DF	(United States) USA	Nolan Norris	10	0	5+5	0	0+0	0
43	FW	(Jamaica) JAM	Tarik Scott	6	2	0+5	2	1+0	0
45	DF	(United States) USA	Will Baker	5	0	1+3	0	1+0	0
47	MF	(United States) USA	Jared Aguilar	5	0	5+0	0	0+0	0
55	MF	(United States) USA	Alejandro Urzua	5	0	3+2	0	0+0	0
61	MF	(United States) USA	Michael Morales	1	0	0+1	0	0+0	0
65	MF	(United States) USA	Dylan Lacy	1	0	0+1	0	0+0	0
68	MF	(United States) USA	Santiago Ferreira	17	0	12+5	0	0+0	0
71	GK	(United States) USA	J. Evestone	1	0	1+0	0	0+0	0

- Last updated: September 25, 2022
- Source: https://www.mlsnextpro.com/clubs/north-texas-sc/stats/#season=2022&competition=mls-next-pro&statType=general&position=all

=== Top scorers ===
Rank	Position	Number	Name	MLS Next Pro	MLSNP Playoffs	Total
1	MF	7	(United States) Bernard Kamungo	16	0	16
2	FW	9	(Colombia) José Mulato	9	0	9
3	FW	10	(Ghana) Hope Avayevu	5	0	5
4	FW	22	(United States) Pablo Torre	4	0	4
5	MF	11	(Brazil) Andre Costa	2	0	2
5	MF	15	(United States) Isaiah Parker	2	0	2
5	FW	17	(Brazil) Luis Cordosa Santos	2	0	2
5	FW	25	(United States) Collin Smith	2	0	2
5	MF	41	(Jamaica) Tarik Scott	2	0	2
10	DF	4	(Canada) Paul Amedume	1	0	1
10	MF	6	(Portugal) Tómas Lacerda	1	0	1
10	MF	8	(United States) Blaine Ferri	1	0	1
10	DF	18	(United States) Derek Waldeck	1	0	1
Total				48	0	48

- Last updated: September 25, 2022
- Source: https://www.mlsnextpro.com/clubs/north-texas-sc/stats/#season=2022&competition=mls-next-pro&statType=general&position=all

=== Top assists ===
Rank	Position	Number	Name	MLS Next Pro	MLSNP Playoffs	Total
1	FW	10	(Ghana) Hope Avayevu	8	0	8
2	MF	7	(United States) Bernard Kamungo	5	0	5
2	FW	25	(United States) Collin Smith	5	0	5
4	DF	15	(United States) Isaiah Parker	4	0	4
5	DF	9	(Colombia) José Mulato	3	0	3
6	FW	17	(Brazil) Luis Cordosa Santos	2	0	2
7	DF	4	(Canada) Paul Amedume	1	0	1
7	DF	5	(United States) Chase Niece	1	0	1
7	MF	6	(Portugal) Tómas Lacerda	1	0	1
7	MF	8	(United States) Blaine Ferri	1	0	1
7	MF	11	(Brazil) Andre Costa	1	0	1
7	DF	12	(United States) Blake Pope	1	0	1
7	MF	20	(United States) Alejandro Araneda	1	0	1
7	FW	22	(United States) Pablo Torre	1	0	1
Total				35	0	35

- Last updated: September 25, 2022
- Source: https://www.mlsnextpro.com/clubs/north-texas-sc/stats/#season=2022&competition=mls-next-pro&statType=general&position=all

=== Disciplinary record ===
No.	Pos.	Player	MLS Next Pro			MLSNP Playoffs			Total		
No.	Pos.	Player	Booked	(yellow card) (yellow-red card)	Sent off (straight red)	Booked	(yellow card) (yellow-red card)	Sent off (straight red)	Booked	(yellow card) (yellow-red card)	Sent off (straight red)
1	GK	(Brazil) Felipe Carneiro	2	0	0	0	0	0	2	0	0
4	DF	(Canada) Paul Amedume	4	0	0	0	0	0	4	0	0
5	DF	(United States) Chase Niece	2	0	0	0	0	0	2	0	0
6	MF	(Portugal) Tomas Pinheiro de Lacerda	2	0	0	0	0	0	2	0	0
7	MF	(United States) Bernard Kamungo	1	0	0	0	0	0	1	0	0
8	MF	(United States) Blaine Ferri	5	0	0	0	0	0	5	0	0
9	MF	(Colombia) José Mulato	2	0	0	0	0	0	2	0	0
10	FW	(Ghana) Hope Avayevu	5	1	0	0	0	0	5	1	0
11	MF	(Brazil) Andre Costa	5	0	0	0	0	0	5	0	0
12	DF	(United States) Blake Pope	4	0	0	0	0	0	4	0	0
13	GK	(United States) Antonio Carrera	1	0	0	0	0	0	1	0	0
15	DF	(United States) Isaiah Parker	3	1	0	0	0	0	3	1	0
16	MF	(Haiti) Carl Fred Sainté	2	0	0	1	0	0	3	0	0
17	FW	(Brazil) Luis Cordosa Santos	3	0	0	0	0	0	3	0	0
18	DF	(United States) Derek Waldeck	3	0	0	0	0	0	3	0	0
20	DF	(United States) Alejandro Araneda	2	0	0	0	0	0	2	0	0
22	FW	(United States) Pablo Torre	2	0	0	0	0	0	2	0	0
25	DF	(United States) Collin Smith	9	0	0	0	0	0	9	0	0
26	DF	(United States) Lucas Bartlett	3	0	0	1	0	0	4	0	0
38	MF	(United States) Santiago Ferreira	3	0	0	0	0	0	3	0	0
42	DF	(United States) Nolan Norris	3	0	0	0	0	0	3	0	0
42	DF	(United States) Lucas Bartlett	0	0	0	1	0	0	1	0	0
45	DF	(United States) Will Baker	1	0	0	0	0	0	1	0	0
47	MF	(United States) Jared Aguilar	2	0	0	0	0	0	2	0	0
55	MF	(United States) Alejandro Urzua	1	0	0	0	0	0	1	0	0
Total			69	2	0	3	0	0	72	2	0

- Last updated: September 25, 2022
- Source: https://www.mlsnextpro.com/clubs/north-texas-sc/stats/#season=2022&competition=mls-next-pro&statType=general&position=all

== Awards and honors ==
=== MLS Next Pro Best XI ===
Award	Awardee	Position	Ref
MLS Next Pro Best XI	Bernard Kamungo	FW	

=== MLS Next Pro Save of the Year ===
Award	Awardee	Position	Ref
MLS Next Pro Save of the Year	Antonio Carrera	GK	
