= Isa Sakamoto =

Japanese footballer (born 2003)

Isa Sakamoto 坂本 一彩
Personal information
- Full name: Isa Sakamoto
- Date of birth: 26 August 2003 (age 23)
- Place of birth: Kumamoto, Japan
- Height: 1.74 m (5 ft 9 in)
- Position: Forward

Team information
- Current team: Westerlo
- Number: 13

Youth career
- Gamba Osaka

Senior career*
Years	Team	Apps	(Gls)
2020	Gamba Osaka U-23	11	(3)
2022–	Gamba Osaka	46	(11)
2023	→ Fagiano Okayama (loan)	24	(4)
2025	→ Westerlo (loan)	19	(6)
2025–	Westerlo	38	(6)

International career^{‡}
2021–	Japan U20	19	(11)
- * Club domestic league appearances and goals as of 1 June 2026 ‡ National team caps and goals as of 15 March 2023, 12:44 (UTC)

Isa Sakamoto (坂本 一彩, Sakamoto Isa; born 26 August 2003) is a Japanese professional footballer who plays as a forward for Belgian Pro League side KVC Westerlo.

== Club career ==
Sakamoto made his professional debut for J3 League side Gamba Osaka U-23, the reserve team of Gamba Osaka on 19 September 2020 against Vanraure Hachinohe. He came on as an 86th-minute substitute for Ko Ise as Gamba Osaka U-23 lost 2–3. Sakamoto scored his first goal for Gamba Osaka U-23 on 6 December 2020 against Azul Claro Numazu. He scored in the 87th minute from the penalty spot to give Osaka the 2–1 victory.

In February 2021, Sakamoto was announced as a Type 2 player, meaning he was registered for both Gamba Osaka Youth and the first team. Although unused in the first team, he scored 15 goals in 13 appearances for the JFA U-18 Premier League. In September 2021, it was announced that Sakamoto would be promoted to the first team for the 2022 season.

Sakamoto made his debut for Gamba Osaka in March 2022, in a 2–2 J.League Cup draw with Oita Trinita. He made his J1 League debut in the following month, appearing as a 71st-minute substitute in a 1–1 draw with Kyoto Sanga. In June, he scored his first goal for the club in a 2–0 league victory over Sanfrecce Hiroshima. In his first season with Gamba, he made 15 appearances across all competitions, scoring 1 goal.

On 29 December 2022, Sakamoto moved on loan to J2 League club Fagiano Okayama for the 2023 season. He scored on his debut in a 3–2 league victory over Júbilo Iwata. He made 26 appearances throughout the season, scoring 4 goals, before returning to his parent club for the 2024 season.

On his return to Gamba, Sakamoto began the season largely used as a substitute, but throughout April he became a starter and scored three goals in the month. For this, he was awarded the Young Player of the Month award. He continued to participate in the majority of games, culminating in a flurry of goals at the end of the season where he was awarded his second Young Player of the Month award for November/December.

In January 2025, it was announced that Sakamoto would be leaving Gamba Osaka to join Belgian side Westerlo. The contract is a loan until the end of the 2024–25 season, then the transfer becomes permanent and a three-year contract with Westerlo will come into effect.

== International career ==
Sakamoto was called up to the Japan U-20 squad for the 2023 FIFA U-20 World Cup.

== Career statistics ==
=== Club ===
As of 24 May 2025.

Appearances and goals by club, season and competition
Club	Season	League			National Cup (Note: Includes Emperor's Cup)		League Cup (Note: Includes J.League Cup)		Continental		Total	
Club	Season	Division	Apps	Goals	Apps	Goals	Apps	Goals	Apps	Goals	Apps	Goals
Gamba Osaka U-23	2020	J3 League	11	3	—		—		—		11	3
Gamba Osaka	2022	J1 League	9	1	2	0	4	0	—		15	1
Gamba Osaka	2024	J1 League	37	10	5	1	1	0	—		43	11
Gamba Osaka	Total		46	11	7	1	5	0	—		58	12
Fagiano Okayama (loan)	2023	J2 League	24	4	2	0	—		—		26	4
Westerlo (loan)	2024–25	Belgian Pro League	19	6	—		—		—		19	6
Westerlo	2025–26	Belgian Pro League	0	0	0	0	—		0	0	0	0
Westerlo	Total		19	6	0	0	—		0	0	19	6
Career total			100	24	9	1	5	0	0	0	114	25
