= Aedan Stanley =

American soccer player (born 1999)

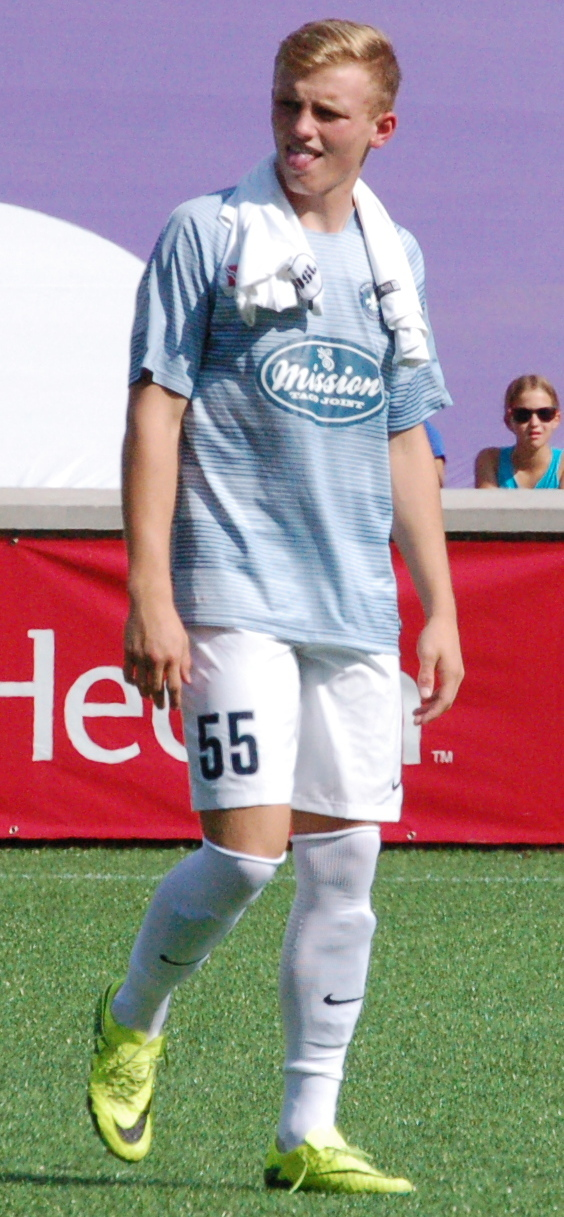
- Stanley playing for Saint Louis in 2016

Personal information
- Full name: Aedan Stanley
- Date of birth: December 13, 1999 (age 26)
- Place of birth: Columbia, Illinois, United States
- Height: 1.89 m (6 ft 2 in)
- Position: Defender

Team information
- Current team: Detroit City
- Number: 3

Youth career
- –2016: St. Louis Scott Gallagher SC

College career
Years	Team	Apps	(Gls)
2018–2019	Duke Blue Devils	37	(0)

Senior career*
Years	Team	Apps	(Gls)
2016	Saint Louis FC U23	4	(0)
2016–2018	Saint Louis FC	18	(0)
2020	Portland Timbers 2	16	(0)
2021	Sporting Kansas City II	0	(0)
2021	Austin FC	9	(0)
2022–2023	Miami FC	64	(0)
2024–2025	Indy Eleven	40	(0)
2026–	Detroit City	24	(0)

International career
2016–2017	United States U18	7	(0)
- * Club domestic league appearances and goals as of November 4, 2026

Aedan Stanley (born December 13, 1999) is an American professional soccer player who plays as a defender for Detroit City FC in the USL Championship.

Born in Columbia, Illinois, Stanley began his career with St. Louis Scott Gallagher before starting his professional career with United Soccer League side Saint Louis FC in 2016. In 2018, Stanley began attending Duke University and played college soccer for the Duke Blue Devils. After two seasons with Duke, Stanley joined Portland Timbers 2, playing one season with them before joining Sporting Kansas City II. Shortly after signing, Stanley was drafted in the 2021 MLS SuperDraft by expansion club Austin FC.

== Early career ==
=== Saint Louis FC ===
Born in Columbia, Illinois, Stanley was part of the academy at St. Louis Scott Gallagher. On May 21, 2016, Stanley signed a USL amateur contract with United Soccer League side Saint Louis FC, which allowed him to play professionally while maintaining NCAA eligibility. On June 16, he was called into the club's reserve side, Saint Louis FC U23, playing 25 minutes in the 3–2 defeat against Mississippi Brilla.

Stanley made his United Soccer League debut for Saint Louis FC on September 24, 2016, in a 2–2 draw against OKC Energy. He came on as a 64th-minute substitute for Schillo Tshuma.

=== Duke Blue Devils (college) ===
In August 2018, Stanley began attending Duke University in Durham, North Carolina and joined their college soccer side, the Duke Blue Devils. He made his collegiate debut on August 24 against the FIU Panthers, starting in the 3–1 victory. During his first season with Duke, Stanley lead the team in starts, starting in 20 matches, while earning All-ACC Freshman honors.

In his second season for the Blue Devils, Stanley started and played in 17 matches, recording three assists.

== Club career ==
=== Portland Timbers 2 (2020) ===
On March 5, 2020, Stanley joined USL Championship club Portland Timbers 2, the reserve affiliate for Major League Soccer side Portland Timbers. He made his Timbers 2 debut on March 7 against Phoenix Rising, starting in the 6–1 away defeat. He started in all 16 matches for the Portland Timbers 2, substituted zero times, and he recorded two assists.

=== Austin FC (2021) ===
On January 15, 2021, Stanley signed with Sporting Kansas City II. However, a few days later, on January 21, Stanley was drafted with the 21st pick in the MLS SuperDraft by Austin FC. On April 16, 2021, Sporting Kansas City agreed to mutually terminate Stanley's contract with their reserve affiliate. That same day, Stanley signed a professional contract with Austin FC.

Stanley made his debut for Austin FC on May 15 in a 2–0 away defeat against the LA Galaxy, coming on as a 70th-minute substitute for Žan Kolmanič.

Following the 2021 season, Stanley's contract option was declined by Austin.

=== Miami FC (2022–2023) ===
On January 4, 2022, Stanley returned to the USL and signed with Miami FC.

Stanley made his debut for Miami on April 9 in a 1–0 win at the Tampa Bay Rowdies in the USL Championship. Stanley played a total of 33 games for Miami in his first season, including the team's two Lamar Hunt U.S. Open Cup matches and Miami's 3-1 conference quarterfinal loss to the Tampa Bay Rowdies in the 2022 USL Championship playoffs.

Stanley returned for Miami in the 2023 season, playing a total of 36 matches. Stanley played all 120 minutes of the club's Open Cup loss in penalties to Inter Miami CF on April 26, 2023.

Stanley's final game for Miami FC came on October 14, 2023, in a 1–0 defeat to Sacramento Republic FC.

=== Indy Eleven (2024–present) ===
On December 4, 2023, Indy Eleven announced the signing of Stanley from Miami FC ahead of the upcoming 2024 USL Championship season. Stanley made his debut for Indy Eleven in their season opening 2–1 defeat at Oakland Roots on March 9. Stanley assisted Douglas Martinez for the team's winning goal in a 2–1 away victory over Memphis 901 FC on March 16.

Stanley was named the USL Championship Player of the Week on May 14 for his two-assist performance in the team's 3–1 away victory over his former club Miami FC in Week 10 of the USL Championship season. Stanley ended the 2024 season with three USL Championship Team of the Week recognitions and one Player of the Week honor. He led the club in assists with 7 total assists. On November 20, 2024, Indy Eleven announced that Stanley would return for the 2025 season.

== International career ==
Stanley's first experience of international football came in June 2015, when he was called into the United States under-16 team for the Open Nordic Cup. He was then called into the United States under-18's in August 2016 for the Vaclav Jezek Tournament. He made his debut against Slovakia on August 16, starting in the 3–1 victory.

== Career statistics ==
As of match played May 28, 2025.

Appearances and goals by club, season and competition
Club	Season	League			National Cup		Playoffs		League Cup		Total	
Club	Season	Division	Apps	Goals	Apps	Goals			Apps	Goals	Apps	Goals
Saint Louis FC U23	2016	Premier Development League	4	0	—		0	0	—		4	0
Saint Louis FC U23	Total		4	0	0	0	0	0	0	0	4	0
Saint Louis FC	2016	United Soccer League	1	0	0	0	0	0	—		1	0
Saint Louis FC	2017	USL	6	0	0	0	0	0	—		6	0
Saint Louis FC	2018	USL	11	0	2	0	0	0	—		13	0
Saint Louis FC	Total		18	0	2	0	0	0	0	0	20	0
Portland Timbers 2	2020	USL Championship	16	0	—		0	0	—		16	0
Portland Timbers 2	Total		16	0	0	0	0	0	0	0	16	0
Austin FC	2021	Major League Soccer	9	0	—		0	0	—		9	0
Austin FC	Total		9	0	0	0	0	0	0	0	9	0
Miami FC	2022	USL C	31	0	2	0	0	0	—		33	0
Miami FC	2023	USL C	34	0	2	0	0	0	—		36	0
Miami FC	Total		65	0	4	0	0	0	0	0	69	0
Indy Eleven	2024	USL C	32	0	4	0	1	0	—		37	0
Indy Eleven	2025	USL C	8	0	2	0	0	0	1	0	11	0
Indy Eleven	Total		40	0	6	0	1	0	1	0	48	0
Career total			152	0	12	0	1	0	1	0	166	0
