= Alan Roberts (footballer) =

English footballer

Personal information
- Full name: Alan Roberts
- Date of birth: 8 December 1964
- Place of birth: Newcastle upon Tyne, England
- Height: 5 ft 9 in (1.75 m)
- Position: Right wing

Youth career
- –: Middlesbrough

Senior career*
Years	Team	Apps	(Gls)
1982–1985	Middlesbrough	38	(2)
1985–1988	Darlington	119	(19)
1988–1989	Sheffield United	36	(2)
1989–1990	Lincoln City	10	(0)
Total		203	(23)
- * Club domestic league appearances and goals

Alan Roberts (born 8 December 1964) is an English former footballer who made 203 appearances in the Football League playing for Middlesbrough, Darlington, Sheffield United and Lincoln City in the 1980s. He played on the right wing, and had pace and a direct style.

Roberts was a regular in the Sheffield United side promoted from the Third Division in 1988–89, his only full season with the club, and provided numerous assists for the forward line. Transfer-listed at his own request early the following season, he joined Lincoln City in October 1989 for a £60,000 fee. He played his last match on 1 January 1990 before his career was ended at the age of 25 because of injury.

Roberts' son Jordan became a footballer, playing in college and professionally in the United States.
