= A. J. Cochran =

American soccer player (born 1993)

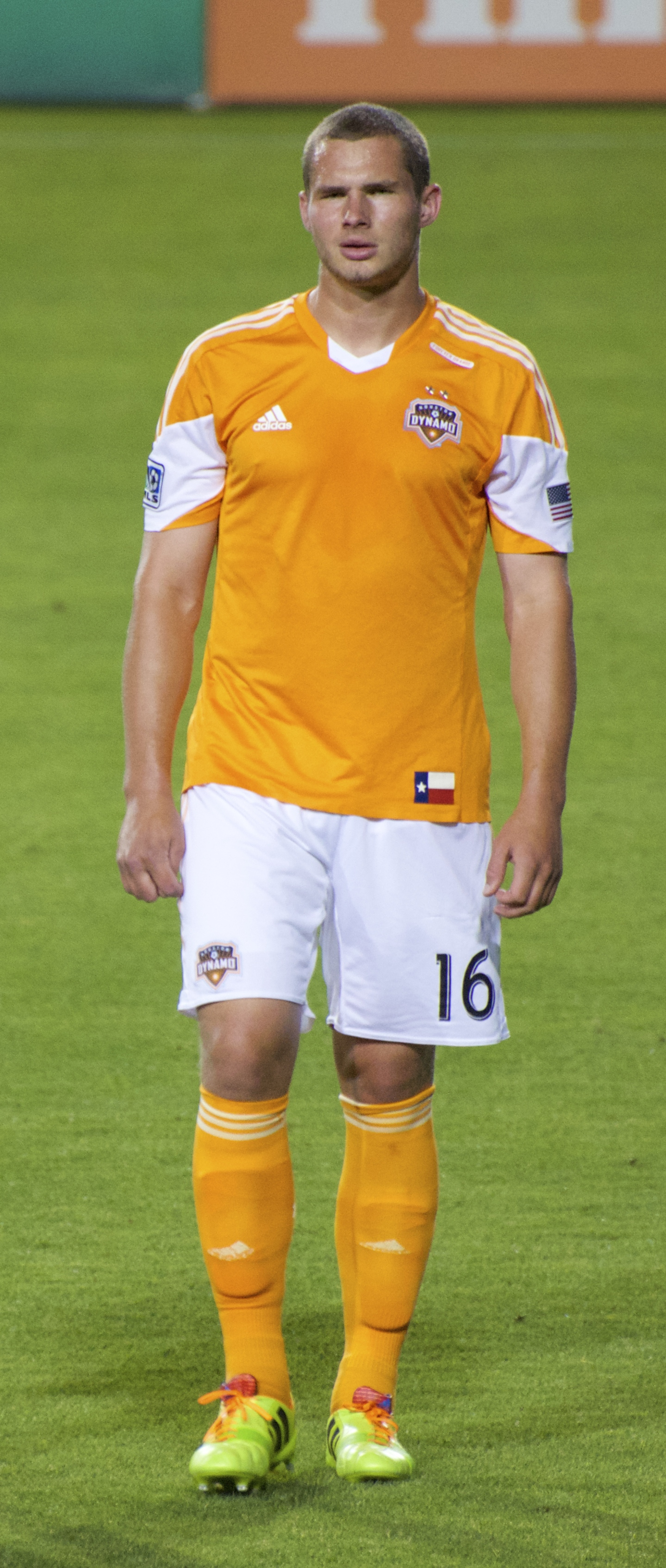
- Cochran in 2014

Personal information
- Full name: Alec John Cochran
- Date of birth: February 9, 1993 (age 33)
- Place of birth: St. Louis, Missouri, United States
- Height: 1.91 m (6 ft 3 in)
- Position: Defender

College career
Years	Team	Apps	(Gls)
2011–2013	Wisconsin Badgers	58	(5)

Senior career*
Years	Team	Apps	(Gls)
2013	Michigan Bucks	5	(0)
2013	K-W United	3	(0)
2014–2015	Houston Dynamo	26	(0)
2015	→ Charleston Battery (loan)	2	(0)
2016–2017	Saint Louis FC	49	(1)
2018	Atlanta United 2	30	(0)
2019–2020	Phoenix Rising	37	(2)
2021–2022	Indy Eleven	47	(1)
2023	Charleston Battery	19	(0)
Total		218	(4)

International career^{‡}
2014	United States U23	1	(0)
- * Club domestic league appearances and goals as of October 17, 2023 ‡ National team caps and goals as of August 16, 2014

Alec John "A. J." Cochran (born February 9, 1993) is an American professional soccer defender.

== Early life and education ==
Cochran was born and raised in St. Louis, Missouri. His parents are Anne and John Cochran and he has one sister. He attended CBC High School. He also played baseball, basketball, and football as a kid, but his dad encouraged him to focus on soccer. He attended the University of Wisconsin.

== Early career ==
Cochran attended CBC High School in St. Louis, Missouri, where he played on the school soccer team. He helped lead the school to a state championship in his junior year and was an NSCAA All-American (and Missouri's Gatorade player of the year) as a senior. He played for club side St. Louis Scott Gallagher as a kid.

Cochran played three years of college soccer at the University of Wisconsin between 2011 and 2013. He helped take the Badgers to the NCAA tournament his junior year. Accolades he received while at Wisconsin include 2011 Big Ten All-Freshman team, 2012 and 2013 first team All-Big Ten, and 2013 Big Ten Defensive Player of the Year. He was also a 2013 first team NSCAA All-American, the first Badger to be a first team all American since 1995.

While at college, Cochran appeared for PDL clubs Michigan Bucks and K-W United FC during their 2013 seasons.

Cochran left Wisconsin after his junior season, signing a Generation Adidas deal with Major League Soccer.

== Houston Dynamo ==
On January 16, 2014, Cochran was drafted by Houston Dynamo in the first-round (16th overall) of the 2014 MLS SuperDraft. He made his professional debut on April 5, coming off the bench in a 4–1 loss to FC Dallas. During his first pro season, Cochran made 19 MLS appearances as the Dynamo finished 8th in the Eastern Conference, missing out on the playoffs. He also made 2 appearances in the U.S. Open Cup.

During the 2015 season, Cochran made 7 MLS appearances as the Dynamo finished 8th in the Western Conference and failed to qualify for the playoffs again. In Open Cup play, Cochran played in all 3 of Houston's games as they reached the quarterfinals, where they lost to Sporting Kansas City 3–1. He also spent part of the season on loan with USL club Charleston Battery, where he made 2 appearances.

On November 30, 2015, Cochran's contract option was declined by the Dynamo.

== Saint Louis FC ==
Despite going on trial with the Colorado Rapids in the 2016 MLS pre-season, where he scored a match winning goal in a friendly against Sacramento Republic, Cochran was not offered a contract and signed with USL club Saint Louis FC on March 6, 2016. He made his debut for Saint Louis on March 26 in a 1–0 loss to Real Monarchs. He had 2 assists from 27 appearances during the regular season as Saint Louis finished 14th in the Western Conference, failing to qualify for the playoffs.

Cochran and Saint Louis opened the 2017 season on March 25 with a 0–0 draw against Louisville City. On May 17 he scored his first goal for Saint Louis in a 4–3 victory against FC Wichita in the U.S. Open Cup. He scored his first league goal for Saint Louis on June 2 in a 2–0 win over Toronto FC II. Cochran ended the season with 18 USL appearances and 1 goal as Saint Louis missed the playoffs again, finishing 12th in the Eastern Conference.

== Atlanta United 2 ==
On January 24, 2018, Cochran signed with Atlanta United 2 of the United Soccer League. He made his debut for Atlanta United 2 on March 24, getting the start in a 3–1 win against New York Red Bulls II. He ended the season with 2 assists from 30 appearances as Atlanta United 2 missed the playoffs after finishing 14th in the Eastern Conference.

== Phoenix Rising FC ==
Cochran signed with Phoenix Rising FC on December 25, 2018. He made his debut for Phoenix on March 16 in a 3–3 draw with New Mexico United. Cochran ended the regular season with 24 appearances and 4 assists, helping Phoenix finish top of the Western Conference. He played in both of Phoenix's playoff games as they lost to Real Monarchs in the quarterfinals. Cochran was named to the 2019 USL Championship All-League Second Team.

On August 8, 2020, Cochran scored his first goal for Phoenix in a 5–2 win over New Mexico. He scored again on October 3 in a 4–1 victory against LA Galaxy II. In a shortened regular season due to the COVID-19 pandemic, Cochran had 2 goals from 13 appearances. He started both of Phoenix's playoff games before the championship game was cancelled after multiple Tampa Bay Rowdies players and staff tested positive for COVID-19.

== Indy Eleven ==
Cochran made the move to USL Championship side Indy Eleven on February 17, 2021. He earned a place in the USL Team of the Week for Week 31 of the 2022 season after scoring a goal and a solid defensive performance in a 4–1 win over the Charleston Battery.

He was released from his contract by mutual agreement on January 31, 2023. During his two years with the club, he accumulated 47 regular season appearances (39 starts) and scored one goal.

== Charleston Battery ==
On February 2, 2023, Cochran joined USL Championship side Charleston Battery for their 2023 season.

== Career statistics ==
As of January 29, 2021

Appearances and goals by club, season and competition
Club	Season	League			Open Cup		Playoffs		Continental		Total	
Club	Season	Division	Apps	Goals	Apps	Goals	Apps	Goals	Apps	Goals	Apps	Goals
Houston Dynamo	2014	MLS	19	0	2	0	—		—		21	0
Houston Dynamo	2015	MLS	7	0	3	0	—		—		10	0
Houston Dynamo	Total		26	0	5	0	0	0	0	0	31	0
Charleston Battery (loan)	2015	USL	2	0	0	0	0	0	—		2	0
Saint Louis FC	2016	USL	27	0	1	0	—		—		28	0
Saint Louis FC	2017	USL	18	1	3	1	—		—		21	2
Saint Louis FC	Total		45	1	4	1	0	0	0	0	49	2
Atlanta United 2	2018	USL	30	0	—		—		—		30	0
Phoenix Rising	2019	USLC	24	0	1	0	2	0	—		27	0
Phoenix Rising	2020	USLC	13	2	0	0	2	0	—		15	2
Phoenix Rising	Total		37	2	1	0	4	0	0	0	42	2
Career total			140	3	10	1	4	0	0	0	154	4

== Honors ==
Phoenix Rising

- USL Championship Regular Season: 2019

Individual

- USL Championship All-League Second Team: 2019
