= Aris Nukic =

German footballer

Aris Nukić
Personal information
- Date of birth: 21 December 1993 (age 32)
- Place of birth: Tübingen, Germany
- Height: 1.84 m (6 ft 0 in)
- Positions: Striker; attacking midfielder

Youth career
- Mehlville High School
- 2009–2012: St. Louis Scott Gallagher

College career
Years	Team	Apps	(Gls)
2012–2013	Lindenwood University		

Senior career*
Years	Team	Apps	(Gls)
2014–2015	FK Olimpik Sarajevo	21	(2)
- * Club domestic league appearances and goals

Aris Nukić (born 21 December 1993) is a German former professional footballer who played as a striker or attacking midfielder. Nukić lasted played for FK Olimpic Sarajevo where he played a part in claiming the first ever Bosnian Cup in the club's history.

== Early life ==
Nukic was born in Tübingen, Germany, on 21 December 1993 to Bosnian parents. Nukić began playing at the age of five after his parents immigrated to the United States. While growing up in St. Louis, Missouri, Nukić attended Lindenwood University, where he received NCAA First Team All-American honors as a sophomore. The All-American honor was the first in the program's history at the NCAA level.

== Professional ==
Nukić signed for FK Olimpik Sarajevo in June 2014. Nukić was a part of the historic first ever Bosnia and Herzegovina Football Cup winning team in 2015.
