= Paul Amedume =

Canadian soccer player

Personal information
- Full name: Paul Bello Amedume
- Date of birth: February 28, 2003 (age 23)
- Place of birth: Toronto, Ontario, Canada
- Height: 1.85 m (6 ft 1 in)
- Positions: Midfielder; defender

Team information
- Current team: BTB SC

Youth career
- Edmonton Internazionale SC
- St. Nicholas Soccer Academy
- BTB SC
- 2017–2018: Vancouver Whitecaps
- 2019–2020: FC Edmonton

Senior career*
Years	Team	Apps	(Gls)
2021–2024	Pacific FC	24	(0)
2022	→ North Texas SC (loan)	19	(1)
2023	→ Nautsa’mawt FC (loan)	1	(0)
2025–	Edmonton BTB SC	4	(0)
- * Club domestic league appearances and goals as of May 17, 2025

Paul Bello Amedume (born February 28, 2003) is a Canadian soccer player who plays as a defender for Edmonton BTB SC in League1 Alberta.

== Early life ==
Amedume began playing youth soccer with Edmonton Internazionale SC, followed by the St. Nicholas Soccer Academy. He began training with the BTB Academy in 2013. In August 2017, he joined the Vancouver Whitecaps Residency Program. In 2019, he played with the FC Edmonton U20 in the Alberta Major Soccer League.

== Club career ==
Amedume began training with Pacific FC of the Canadian Premier League in October 2021, eventually signing a developmental contract with the club on October 26. He made his debut on the same day, in a substitute appearance against FC Edmonton.

On February 28, 2022, Amedume was loaned to FC Dallas reserve team North Texas SC with an option to buy, rejoining recently departed Pacific manager Pah-Modou Kah. He scored his first goal on May 8 against the Tacoma Defiance.

In December 2022, Pacific announced Amedume would return to the club ahead of the 2023 CPL season. During 2023, he spent some time on loan with Pacific's League1 British Columbia affiliate Nautsa’mawt FC.

== International career ==
Amedume was named to the 60-man provisional Canadian U-20 team for the 2022 CONCACAF U-20 Championship.

== Career statistics ==
As of September 14, 2024

Appearances and goals by club, season and competition
Club	Season	League			Playoffs		Domestic Cup		Continental		Total	
Club	Season	Division	Apps	Goals	Apps	Goals	Apps	Goals	Apps	Goals	Apps	Goals
Pacific FC	2021	Canadian Premier League	1	0	1	0	0	0	–		2	0
Pacific FC	2023	Canadian Premier League	12	0	2	0	1	0	–		15	0
Pacific FC	2024	Canadian Premier League	11	0	0	0	2	0	–		13	0
Pacific FC	Total		24	0	3	0	3	0	0	0	30	0
North Texas SC (loan)	2022	MLS Next Pro	19	1	0	0	–		–		19	1
Nautsa’mawt FC (loan)	2023	League1 British Columbia	1	0	–		–		–		1	0
Career total			44	1	3	0	3	0	0	0	50	1
