= Christian Volesky =

American soccer player (born 1992)

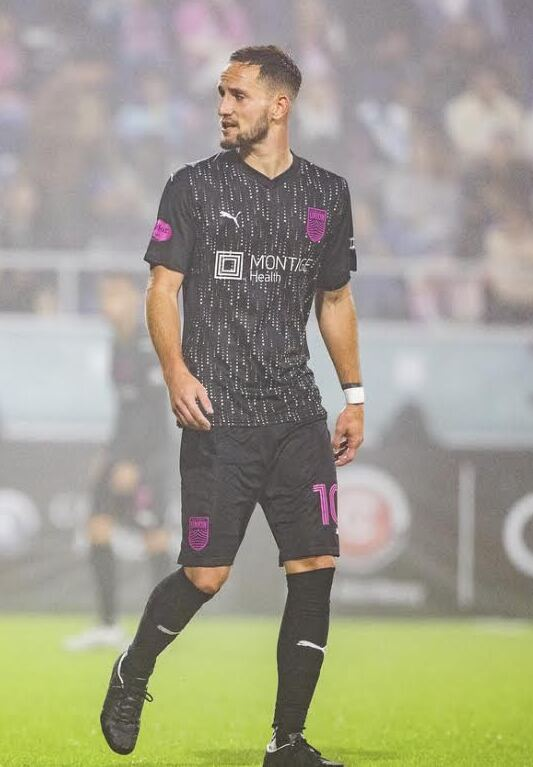
- Volesky playing for Monterey Bay FC in 2023

Personal information
- Date of birth: September 15, 1992 (age 34)
- Place of birth: Henderson, Nevada, United States
- Height: 6 ft 1 in (1.85 m)
- Position: Forward

Youth career
- 2009–2011: Downtown Las Vegas SC

College career
Years	Team	Apps	(Gls)
2011	Denver Pioneers	15	(6)
2012–2014	SIU Edwardsville Cougars	58	(23)

Senior career*
Years	Team	Apps	(Gls)
2014	FC Tucson	6	(3)
2015–2016	Rochester Rhinos	55	(20)
2017–2018	Saint Louis FC	34	(9)
2018	Oklahoma City Energy	18	(9)
2019	Pittsburgh Riverhounds	24	(3)
2020	Colorado Springs Switchbacks	16	(5)
2021	Keflavík	15	(4)
2022–2023	Monterey Bay	55	(19)
2024	HFX Wanderers	6	(0)
2024	Monterey Bay	7	(0)
2025	Lexington SC	1	(0)
- * Club domestic league appearances and goals as of November 2, 2024

Christian Volesky (born September 15, 1992) is an American professional soccer player who plays as a forward.

== College and amateur ==
Volesky played four years of college soccer, spending one year at the University of Denver and three years at SIU Edwardsville. While at college, Volesky appeared for USL PDL club FC Tucson during their 2014 season. Volesky played four years at Foothill High School in Henderson, NV.

== Club career ==
Volesky was named the 2015 MLS Combine Most Valuable Player after registering two goals in three games and finishing first in agility, 5–10–5, and second in the 30 meter sprint.

On January 15, 2015, Volesky was selected 32nd overall in the 2015 MLS SuperDraft by Portland Timbers. However, he did not sign with the club.

=== Rochester Rhinos ===
Volesky joined USL club Rochester Rhinos on March 24, 2015. Volesky helped lead the Rhinos to a 19-game unbeaten streak and the 2015 USL Championship. Volesky led the team in goals, with eight, and points, with 19, while also claiming three assists his rookie season. In his second season with the Rhinos, Volesky, again led the team with ten goals and twelve goals in all competitions, while adding four assists.

On January 9, 2017, Volesky's MLS rights were traded to Sporting Kansas City from Portland Timbers.

=== Saint Louis FC ===
On March 6, 2017, Saint Louis FC announced that they had signed Christian Volesky. Volesky was the club's leading scorer for the 2017 season.

=== Pittsburgh Riverhounds ===
After spending most of the 2018 season with USL side Oklahoma City Energy, Volesky joined Pittsburgh Riverhounds SC on February 7, 2019. Volesky scored his first goal for Pittsburgh on April 27, 2019, during a 2–2 draw against Nashville SC.

=== Colorado Springs Switchbacks ===
On January 8, 2020, Volesky made the move to USL Championship side Colorado Springs Switchbacks.

=== Keflavík ===
On April 9, 2021, Volesky moved to Icelandic Úrvalsdeild side Keflavík.

=== Monterey Bay ===
Volesky signed with USL Championship side Monterey Bay on February 2, 2022, ahead of their inaugural season. Volesky earned his first start for Monterey Bay on April 30, 2022, during a 6–0 road loss against San Antonio FC. On June 11, 2022, Volesky scored his first goal for Monterey Bay during a 3–2 loss to San Antonio FC. Following the 2022 season, Volesky and Monterey Bay agreed a new two-year contract. He left Monterey Bay following their 2023 season.

=== HFX Wanderers FC ===
On February 14, 2024, Volesky signed with the Halifax Wanderers of the Canadian Premier League for the 2024 season with a team option for 2025. He made his debut on April 13, 2024, against Pacific FC. In August 2024, he agreed to a mutual termination of his contract with the club.

=== Return to Monterey Bay ===
On September 5, 2024, Volesky was announced as returning to Monterey Bay FC for the remainder of the 2024 USL Championship season.

=== Lexington SC ===
On March 14, 2025, Volesky joined Lexington SC on a 25-day contract.
