= Jasson Ramos Carpio =

Guatemalan footballer

Personal information
- Date of birth: June 13, 1993 (age 33)
- Place of birth: Guatemala
- Height: 1.80 m (5 ft 11 in)
- Position: Midfielder

Youth career
- Barcena

Senior career*
Years	Team	Apps	(Gls)
–	Villa Nueva F.C		
2016	Tulsa Roughnecks	24	(3)
- * Club domestic league appearances and goals as of October 4, 2016

Jasson Ramos Carpio (born June 13, 1993) is a professional Guatemalan footballer who plays as a midfielder.
