= Erick Cabalceta =

Salvadorean footballer (born 1993)

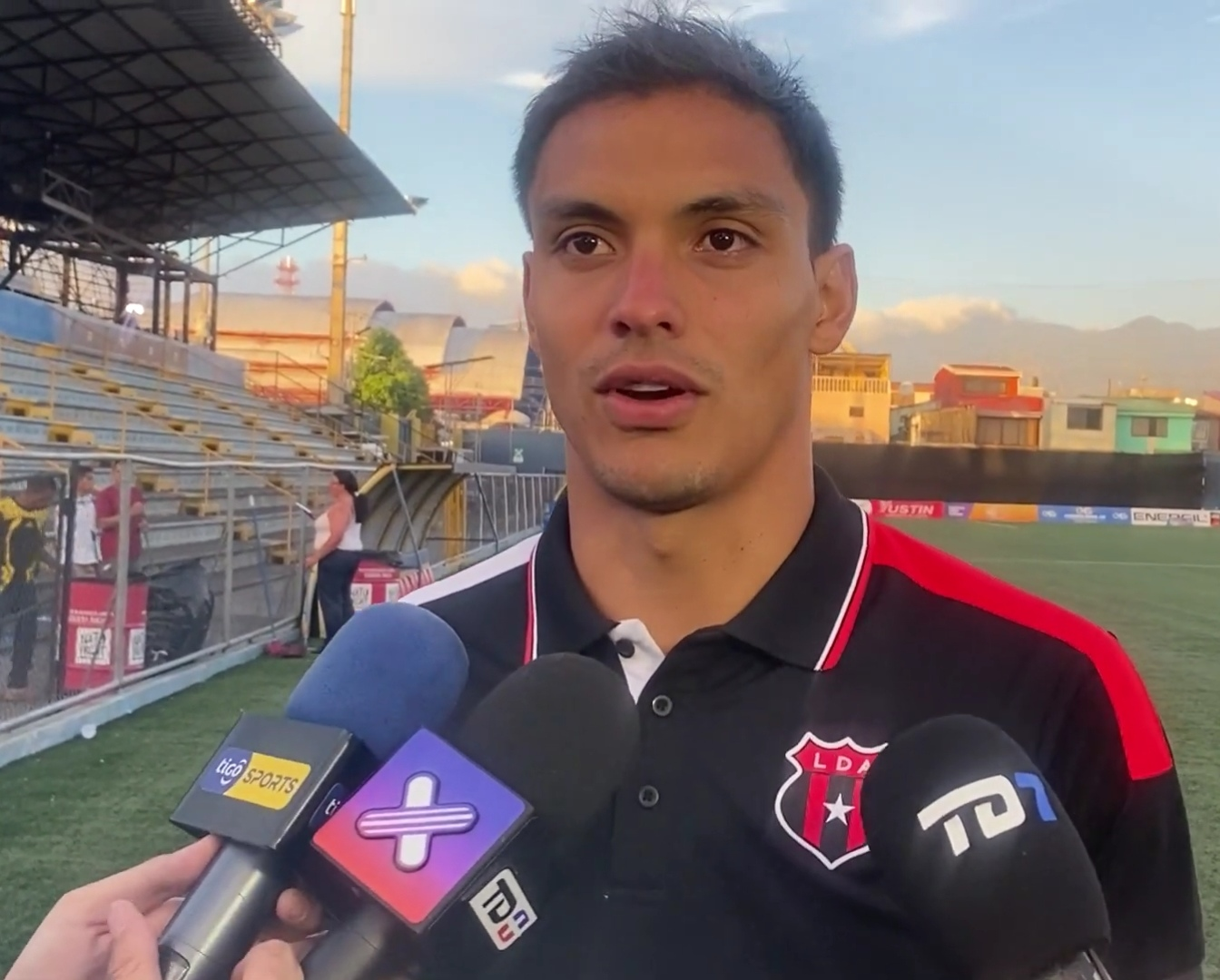
- Cabalceta in 2023

Personal information
- Full name: Erick Anthony Cabalceta Giacchero
- Date of birth: 9 January 1993 (age 33)
- Place of birth: San José, Costa Rica
- Height: 1.86 m (6 ft 1 in)
- Position: Centre-back

Youth career
- Municipal Tibás

Senior career*
Years	Team	Apps	(Gls)
2010–2011	Brujas	2	(0)
2011–2012	Orión	19	(2)
2012–2016	Catania	0	(0)
2014–2015	→ Cartaginés (loan)	14	(1)
2015–2016	→ Deportivo Saprissa (loan)	0	(0)
2016–2017	→ Carmelita (loan)	16	(0)
2017	Saint Louis FC	11	(0)
2017–2018	Carmelita	33	(4)
2019–2020	Cartaginés	38	(3)
2020–2022	San Carlos	47	(3)
2022–2023	Alajuelense	12	(0)
2023–2024	San Carlos	9	(0)
2024	Municipal Limeño	0	(0)
2025	Águila	4	(0)

International career^{‡}
2013	Costa Rica U20	4	(0)
2014	Costa Rica U21	2	(1)
2022–2023	El Salvador	11	(0)
- * Club domestic league appearances and goals as of 31 March 2024 ‡ National team caps and goals as of 18 January 2024

Erick Anthony Cabalceta Giacchero (born 9 January 1993) is a professional footballer who plays as a centre-back. Born in Costa Rica, he plays for the El Salvador national team.

== Club career ==
Born in San José, Cabalceta played youth football with Municipal Tibás before playing as a defender for Brujas and Orión, both in the Costa Rican Primera División. Cabalceta has Italian heritage and acquired Italian citizenship in 2012 before signing a four-year contract with Serie A side Catania. After one season captaining the club's youth side, he joined the senior squad for the 2013–14 season. In September 2015, Deportivo Saprissa signed Erick Cabalceta and midfielder Christian Bolanos.

=== Cartaginés ===
In June 2014, Cabalceta was signed by Cartaginés on a 1-year contract on loan.

=== Saint Louis FC ===
On November 30, 2016, Saint Louis FC announced they have agreed to a contract with defender Erick Cabalceta pending United Soccer League and United States Soccer Federation approval.

== International career ==
Cabalceta was born in Costa Rica, and is of Salvadoran descent through a grandmother. He has appeared for the Costa Rica national under-20 football team in the 2013 CONCACAF U-20 Championship where they were eliminated by Cuba in the knockout stage.

He opted to represent the El Salvador national team in 2022. He debuted with them in a 3–1 CONCACAF Nations League win over Grenada on 7 June 2022.
