= Ryan Howe =

American soccer player

Personal information
- Date of birth: September 20, 1993 (age 33)
- Place of birth: Rockford, Illinois, United States
- Height: 1.78 m (5 ft 10 in)
- Position: Defender

Team information
- Current team: Saint Louis FC
- Number: 23

College career
Years	Team	Apps	(Gls)
2012–2016	Loyola Ramblers	60	(4)

Senior career*
Years	Team	Apps	(Gls)
2016	Ocean City Nor'easters	10	(0)
2017–2018	Saint Louis FC	18	(2)
- * Club domestic league appearances and goals as of 11:08, 20 October 2017 (UTC)

Ryan Howe (born September 20, 1993) is an American soccer player.

== Career ==
=== College and amateur ===
Howe spent his entire college career at Loyola University Chicago. He made a total of 60 appearances for the Ramblers, and tallied 4 goals.

Howe also played in the Premier Development League for Ocean City Nor'easters in 2016.

=== Professional ===
Howe signed with United Soccer League side Saint Louis FC on March 5, 2017. He made his professional debut for the club on March 25, 2017, in a 0–0 draw with Louisville City FC.
