= Blake Pope =

American soccer player (born 2003)

Personal information
- Full name: Blake Pope
- Date of birth: April 11, 2003 (age 23)
- Place of birth: Prosper, Texas, United States
- Height: 6 ft 2 in (1.89 m)
- Position: Defender

Team information
- Current team: Las Vegas Lights
- Number: 45

Youth career
- 2015–2016: D.C. United
- 2016–2019: FC Dallas
- 2019–2021: Charlotte Independence

Senior career*
Years	Team	Apps	(Gls)
2021	Charlotte Independence	10	(0)
2022	North Texas SC	23	(0)
2023–2025	Portland Timbers 2	52	(5)
2026–	Las Vegas Lights	22	(1)
- * Club domestic league appearances and goals as of 10:23, 9 November 2026 (UTC)

Blake Pope (born April 11, 2003) is an American soccer player who plays as a defender for USL Championship side Las Vegas Lights FC.

== Career ==
Born in Prosper, Texas, Pope began his career in the youth academy of D.C. United before joining the FC Dallas system in 2016. In 2019, Pope joined the Charlotte Independence youth academy. In 2021, it was announced that Pope had committed to playing college soccer for the Charlotte 49ers. Pope later de-committed from playing at UNC Charlotte.

On April 29, 2021, Pope signed an academy deal with the Charlotte Independence, allowing him to play matches in the USL Championship while maintaining his NCAA eligibility. He made his senior debut for the club on May 1 against the Tampa Bay Rowdies, coming on as a 78th-minute substitute in a 3–0 defeat.

On March 4, 2022, Pope signed with MLS Next Pro club North Texas SC ahead of their 2022 season. He signed a new one-year contract with Portland in November 2024.

In January 2026, Las Vegas Lights of the USL Championship announced they had signed Pope on a free transfer from Portland Timbers 2.

== Career statistics ==
As of match played May 14, 2021

Appearances and goals by club, season and competition
Club	Season	League			Cup		Continental		Total	
Club	Season	Division	Apps	Goals	Apps	Goals	Apps	Goals	Apps	Goals
Charlotte Independence	2021	USL Championship	2	0	0	0	—		2	0
Career total			2	0	0	0	0	0	2	0
