= Collin Smith =

American soccer player (born 2003)

Personal information
- Date of birth: December 4, 2003 (age 22)
- Place of birth: Jacksonville, Florida, United States
- Height: 5 ft 10 in (1.78 m)
- Position: Right-back

Team information
- Current team: Phoenix Rising FC

Youth career
- 2016–2018: Solar Chelsea SC
- 2018–2021: FC Dallas

Senior career*
Years	Team	Apps	(Gls)
2019–2022	North Texas	66	(3)
2021–2023	FC Dallas	1	(0)
2023	→ Birmingham Legion (loan)	14	(0)
2024	New England Revolution II	1	(0)
2024	Rhode Island FC	18	(0)
2025–	Phoenix Rising	51	(2)
- * Club domestic league appearances and goals as of October 31, 2026

Collin Smith (born December 4, 2003) is an American soccer player who plays as a right-back for Phoenix Rising FC of the USL Championship.

== Career ==
=== North Texas ===
Smith made his league debut for the club on July 25, 2020, coming on as a late substitute for Beni Redžić in a 2–1 home victory over Forward Madison.

=== FC Dallas ===
On April 28, 2021, Smith signed as a homegrown player with FC Dallas.

Smith was loaned to USL Championship side Birmingham Legion on March 10, 2023. Smith was recalled from his loan by Dallas on July 4, 2023. Smith was released by Dallas following the 2023 season.

On January 8, 2024, Smith signed with New England Revolution II.

On March 29, 2024, Smith mutually agreed to part ways with New England Revolution II. That same day, it was announced that he signed a contract with Rhode Island FC during their debut season in the USL Championship. He was released by Rhode Island following the 2024 season.

=== Phoenix Rising FC ===
Smith signed with Phoenix Rising FC on December 23, 2024.
