= Mitchell Lurie =

American soccer player

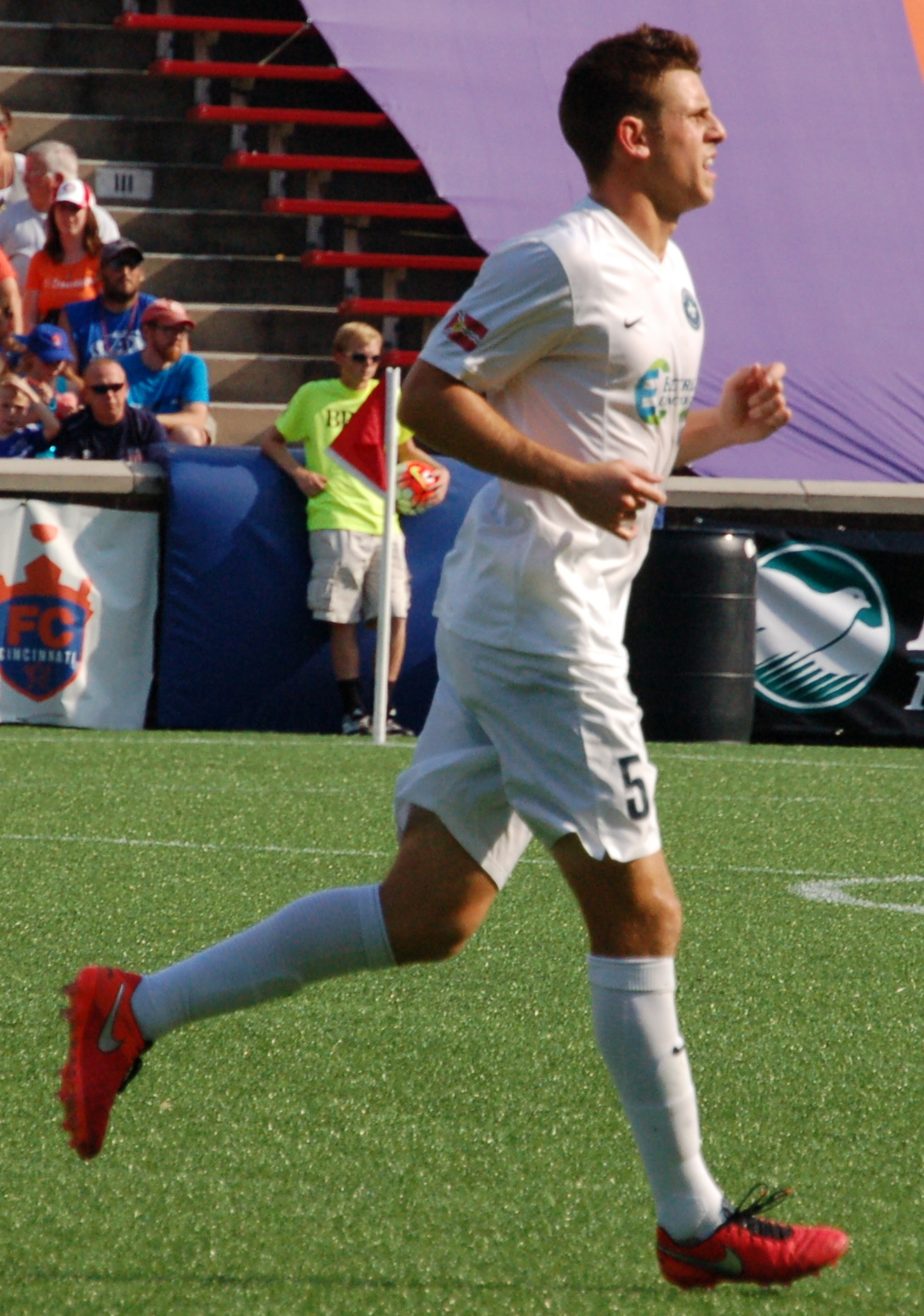
- Lurie playing for Saint Louis FC in 2016

Personal information
- Date of birth: July 20, 1993 (age 33)
- Place of birth: Portland, Oregon, United States
- Height: 6 ft 2 in (1.88 m)
- Position: Defender

College career
Years	Team	Apps	(Gls)
2012–2013	Portland Pilots	31	(3)
2014	Louisville Cardinals	5	(0)
2015	Rutgers Scarlet Knights	21	(0)

Senior career*
Years	Team	Apps	(Gls)
2013	Portland Timbers U23s	12	(0)
2014–2015	Ocean City Nor'easters		
2016	Saint Louis FC	14	(0)

International career
2011	United States U18		
- * Club domestic league appearances and goals as of October 10, 2016

Mitchell Lurie (born July 20, 1993) is an American soccer player.

== Career ==
=== Youth and college ===
Lurie played four years of college soccer, beginning at the University of Portland, before transferring to Louisville University and later Rutgers University for his senior year.

While at college, Lurie also appeared for Premier Development League sides Portland Timbers U23s and Ocean City Nor'easters.

=== Professional ===
On January 19, 2016, Lurie was selected 44th overall in the 2016 MLS SuperDraft by Philadelphia Union. However, he wasn't signed by the club.

Lurie joined United Soccer League side Saint Louis FC on March 16, 2016. He logged over 1,000 minutes while appearing in 15 games.

Lurie was released by Saint Louis FC on November 10, 2016.
