= Ko Ise =

Japanese footballer

Personal information
- Date of birth: 17 July 2002 (age 24)
- Place of birth: Tokyo, Japan
- Height: 1.72 m (5 ft 8 in)
- Position: Midfielder

Youth career
- St. Louis Scott Gallagher
- Dream FC
- –2020: Gamba Osaka

College career
Years	Team	Apps	(Gls)
2021–	Waseda University		

Senior career*
Years	Team	Apps	(Gls)
2019–2020	Gamba Osaka U-23	42	(1)
- * Club domestic league appearances and goals as of 17:04, 10 November 2020 (UTC)

Ko Ise (伊勢 航, Ise Ko; born 17 July 2002) is a Japanese footballer currently studying at the Waseda University.

== Career statistics ==
=== Club ===
As of 17 March 2021.

Club	Season	League			National Cup		League Cup		Other		Total	
Club	Season	Division	Apps	Goals	Apps	Goals	Apps	Goals	Apps	Goals	Apps	Goals
Gamba Osaka U-23	2019	J3 League	15	0	–		–		0	0	15	0
Gamba Osaka U-23	2020	J3 League	27	1	–		–		0	0	27	1
Career total			42	1	0	0	0	0	0	0	42	1
