= Vince Cicciarelli =

American soccer player

Personal information
- Full name: Vincent Dominic Cicciarelli
- Date of birth: February 23, 1993 (age 33)
- Place of birth: Peoria, Illinois, United States
- Height: 1.86 m (6 ft 1 in)
- Positions: Attacking midfielder; forward

Youth career
- 2011–2014: Notre Dame Fighting Irish
- 2015: Saint Louis Billikens

Senior career*
Years	Team	Apps	(Gls)
2015	Des Moines Menace	8	(5)
2016	Saint Louis FC	23	(5)
- * Club domestic league appearances and goals as of October 10, 2016

Vincent "Vince" Dominic Cicciarelli (born February 23, 1993) is an American former soccer player.

== Career ==
=== College ===
Cicciarelli played college soccer at the University of Notre Dame between 2012 and 2015 (red-shirting his freshman season in 2011), upon graduation in May 2015, he transferred to Saint Louis University for his fifth year of NCAA eligibility to pursue his MBA.

Cicciarelli also played for Premier Development League side Des Moines Menace in 2015, appearing in 8 games and scoring 5 goals.

=== Professional ===
Cicciarelli was selected in the third round (60th overall) of the 2016 MLS SuperDraft by the Columbus Crew. Released by the Crew during training camp without a contract, he then signed with USL side Saint Louis FC on March 3, 2016.

Cicciarelli made his debut with the club on March 30, appearing as a substitute in a match against LA Galaxy II. Three days later, again entering as a substitute during a match against the Orange County Blues, he registered his first professional goals, scoring twice in the second half; he was named the USL Player of the Week for his performance, becoming the first Saint Louis FC player to win the award. The following week, Cicciarelli scored in a 2–2 draw against Oklahoma City Energy, and was again named to the USL Team of the Week.
