= Chase Niece =

American soccer player

Personal information
- Date of birth: October 28, 1998 (age 28)
- Place of birth: St. Louis, Missouri, United States
- Height: 6 ft 2 in (1.88 m)
- Position: Defender

Youth career
- 2013–2017: St. Louis Scott Gallagher

College career
Years	Team	Apps	(Gls)
2017	Tulsa Golden Hurricane	0	(0)
2018–2021	Saint Louis Billikens	63	(6)

Senior career*
Years	Team	Apps	(Gls)
2021	St. Louis Scott Gallagher	9	(0)
2022	North Texas SC	11	(0)
- * Club domestic league appearances and goals as of September 23, 2022

Chase Niece (born October 28, 1998) is an American soccer player.

== Playing career ==
=== Youth, college and amateur ===
Niece played high school soccer at Kirkwood High School, where he was a Top 150 recruit by TopDrawerSoccer.com. He also played four years of club soccer with the St. Louis Scott Gallagher academy, scoring six goals in over 80 appearances for the team.

In 2017, Niece attended the University of Tulsa to play college soccer, but redshirted his entire freshman season. He transferred to Saint Louis University in 2018, going on make 63 appearances for the Billikens, scoring six goals and tallying two assists. Niece was named to the A-10 All-Championship team in 2021.

During 2021, Niece also played in the USL League Two for St. Louis Scott Gallagher, making nine appearances.

=== MLS SuperDraft ===
On January 11, 2022, Niece was selected 66th overall in the 2022 MLS SuperDraft by FC Dallas.

=== North Texas SC ===
On February 17, 2022, Niece signed with North Texas SC, the MLS Next Pro side for Dallas. He made his debut on March 27, 2022, starting in a 3–1 win over Minnesota United FC 2.
