= Jordan Roberts (footballer, born 1993) =

English footballer (born 1993)

Personal information
- Date of birth: 2 January 1993 (age 33)
- Place of birth: Durham, England
- Positions: Midfielder; forward

College career
Years	Team	Apps	(Gls)
2011–2014	Quincy Hawks		

Senior career*
Years	Team	Apps	(Gls)
2014	St. Louis Lions	14	(4)
2015–2016	Saint Louis FC	37	(4)
2017	Reno 1868	1	(0)
- * Club domestic league appearances and goals as of 23:39, 20 October 2017 (UTC)

Jordan Roberts (born 2 January 1993) is an English footballer.

== Career ==
=== College ===
Roberts played four years of college soccer at Quincy University between 2011 and 2014. At Quincy, Roberts scored 52 goals in 82 appearances.

Roberts also appeared for USL PDL side St. Louis Lions in 2014.

=== Professional ===
Roberts signed with USL side Saint Louis FC on 10 March 2015. He made his first professional appearance during a match against Wilmington Hammerheads FC at World Wide Technology Soccer Park on 9 May 2015.

== Personal life ==
Roberts' father, Alan, played more than 200 matches in the English Football League in the 1980s before his career was ended by injury.
