= Schillo Tshuma =

Zimbabwean footballer (born 1992)

Personal information
- Full name: Ntokozo Tshuma
- Date of birth: September 21, 1992 (age 34)
- Place of birth: Bulawayo, Zimbabwe
- Height: 1.78 m (5 ft 10 in)
- Position: Forward

Youth career
- Pachuca Internationals
- Bethesda SC
- 2011: Episcopal HS
- 2012–2013: Maryland Terrapins

Senior career*
Years	Team	Apps	(Gls)
2014–2015	Portland Timbers	0	(0)
2014	→ Orange County Blues (loan)	2	(0)
2014	→ Arizona United (loan)	17	(0)
2015	→ Portland Timbers 2 (loan)	10	(0)
2015	Arizona United	6	(1)
2016	Saint Louis FC	19	(4)
Total		54	(5)

International career
- Zimbabwe U17
- Zimbabwe U23
- * Club domestic league appearances and goals as of October 10, 2016

Ntokozo "Schillo" Tshuma (born September 21, 1992) is a Zimbabwean former professional footballer who played as a forward.

== Career ==
Tshuma attended Episcopal High School in Alexandria, Virginia. He was a member of two College Cup sqads with the Maryland Terrapins men's soccer team.

On January 16, 2014, Tshuma was drafted 17th overall in the 2014 MLS SuperDraft by the Portland Timbers. Two months later, he was loaned out to USL Pro club Orange County Blues FC. He made his professional debut on April 5 in 2–0 loss to Oklahoma City Energy FC. On July 20, 2015, Tshuma was waived from the Portland Timbers

On March 25, 2016, USL club Saint Louis FC announced their signing of Tshuma.
