= Chad Bond =

Welsh footballer (born 1987)

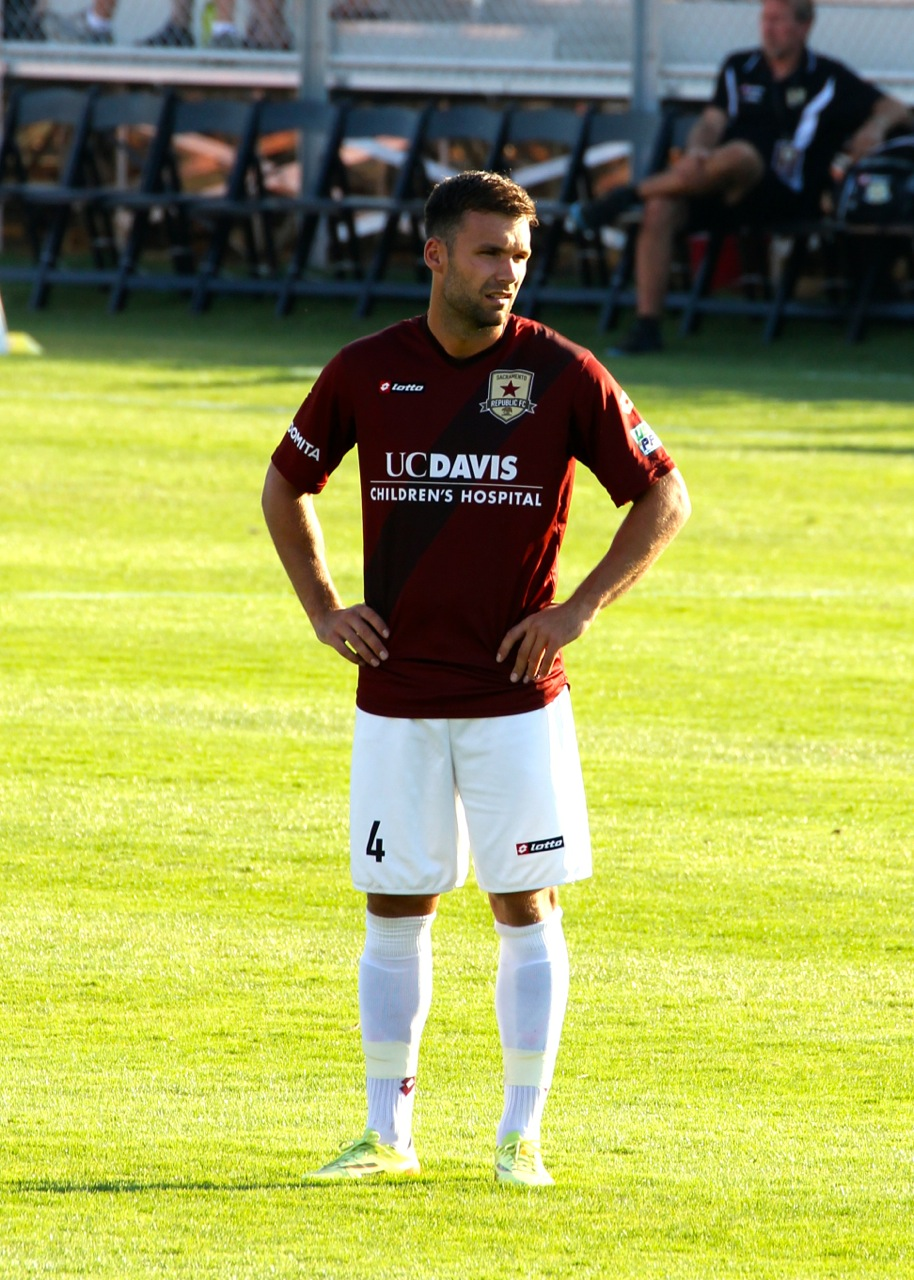

Personal information
- Date of birth: 20 April 1987 (age 39)
- Place of birth: Neath, Wales
- Height: 6 ft 0 in (1.83 m)
- Position: Midfielder

Youth career
- 2000–2003: Swansea City

Senior career*
Years	Team	Apps	(Gls)
2003–2005	Swansea City	1	(0)
2005	→ Newport County (loan)	2	(1)
2006–2008	Port Talbot Town	47	(12)
2008–2010	Swansea City	2	(0)
2008	→ CF Balaguer (loan)	23	(6)
2009	→ Östersunds FK (loan)	5	(2)
2010–2011	Neath	36	(14)
2011–2012	Llanelli	16	(1)
2012	→ Afan Lido (loan)	1	(0)
2012	Los Angeles Blues	2	(0)
2013–2014	Port Talbot Town	17	(4)
2014	Sacramento Republic	5	(0)
2014–2015	Port Talbot Town	23	(3)
2015	Tulsa Roughnecks	24	(0)
2016–2017	Saint Louis FC	27	(2)
2017	Oklahoma City Energy	12	(0)

International career^{‡}
2004	Wales U17	1	(0)
2004–2005	Wales U19	6	(1)
2007–2008	Wales Semi-Pro	5	(1)
- * Club domestic league appearances and goals as of 12:53, 21 October 2017 (UTC) ‡ National team caps and goals as of 12 March 2011

Chad Bond (born 20 April 1987) is a Welsh footballer. He is a former Wales under-19 international and has also represented his country at semi-professional level.

== Career ==
Born in Neath, Bond started his career with Swansea City and spent time on loan at Conference South side Newport County. He made his professional debut for Swansea in a 4–0 win over Rushden & Diamonds in the Football League Trophy on 22 November 2005, but was released by manager Kenny Jackett in 2005. He joined Port Talbot Town in the Welsh Premier League.

Following the appointment of former Swansea player Roberto Martínez as manager, Bond was handed a trial at Swansea in a pre-season friendly against Hamilton in which he came off the bench to score twice. His performance convinced Martinez to hand him a one-year deal to return to the Liberty Stadium.

In early 2008 he was loaned out to Spanish side CF Balaguer and during the summer of 2008 was involved in first-team preparations for the Championship, which included a few appearances on the club's tour of Spain. On 22 August 2009, Bond made his league debut for Swansea when he started in a 1–0 win over Coventry City. He also went out on loan to Swedish team Östersunds FK.

Prior to the start of the 2010–11 season, Bond spent time on trial with Newport County before eventually joining Neath on 5 August 2010. He left the club in June 2011 and joined Llanelli the following month before joining Afan Lido on loan in January 2012.

In February 2012 he cut short his loan period at Lido and his contract with Llanelli was terminated by mutual consent.

Bond had been on trial in January 2012 with Los Angeles Blues of the USL Professional Division and on leaving Llanelli, his former club reported he was leaving to join the LA Blues having secured a playing contract with the US club. In March 2012 the deal was confirmed by his new club. He then returned home to Wales at the end of the season and joined Port Talbot Town, where he found success.

On 20 March 2014, Bond signed for new USL Pro League team Sacramento Republic.

Bond cancelled his contract with Sacramento Republic in August 2014, and signed with Port Talbot Town for the third time.

Bond returned to the United States in March 2015, signing with Tulsa Roughnecks. He recorded 8 assists in 24 appearances for the club.

On 7 January 2016, USL club Saint Louis FC announced that they had signed Bond for the 2016 season.

Bond played the 2017 season with USL side OKC Energy FC, but was released at the end of the season.
