= St. Louis Scott Gallagher SC =

St. Louis Scott Gallagher
- Full name: St. Louis Scott Gallagher Soccer Club
- Founded: 2008; 18 years ago
- Stadium: World Wide Technology Soccer Park; Fenton, Missouri
- Coordinates: 38°32′48″N 90°26′19″W
- President: Steve Pecher
- Website: https://www.slsgsoccer.com/
| Home colors | Away colors |

The St. Louis Scott Gallagher Soccer Club (SLSG) is a sports club dedicated to the development and advancement of all levels of soccer in the St. Louis metropolitan area of Missouri and Illinois.

== History ==
The result of the 2007 merger of three of the area's leading soccer clubs (St. Louis/Busch Soccer Club, Scott Gallagher Soccer Club, and Metro United Soccer Club), SLSG sponsors 275 teams for boys and girls in age groups from under-6 through under-20, including being one of the original members of the MLS Next.

== Pre Merger History ==
In 2008, St. Louis Scott Gallagher came to be after the merger of three major youth soccer clubs in the St. Louis region, St. Louis Soccer Club (formally known as Busch Soccer Club), Scott Gallagher Soccer Club, and Metro United Soccer Club. Each club has their own rich history of player development impacting the game in the region.

St. Louis Soccer Club (Busch Soccer Club)

The story of St. Louis Soccer Club dates back to the early 1970s when Dennis Long, later inducted into the USSF Hall of Fame, founded the Busch Gardens Soccer Club, backed by Anheuser-Busch. By 1980, the club had evolved into the Busch Soccer Club, and by 2004, it became St. Louis Soccer Club to better reflect its mission. Over the years, the club became one of the most successful in the nation, with 15 National Championships and countless state and regional titles to its name. Its boys’ and girls’ teams were consistently ranked among the top 20 in the country, solidifying St. Louis Soccer Club's place as a powerhouse in American youth soccer.

Scott Gallagher Soccer Club

In 1976, St. Louis businessman Jim Scott, co-owner of Scott-Gallagher Inc., became involved with a small soccer club in north St. Louis County called Ruiz S.C. Within a year, Scott took over sponsorship, and in 1979, the club officially became Scott Gallagher Soccer Club. What followed was a trailblazing journey in youth soccer, highlighted by the 1981 McGuire Cup National Championship — the club's first of many. By 2008, Scott Gallagher had won 11 National Championships, multiple regional titles, and was regularly listed among Soccer America's top 20 boys' soccer clubs. The club was renowned for its commitment to excellence and its ability to develop some of the best soccer talent in the country.

Metro United Soccer Club

Given the strong heritage of soccer in St. Louis, it was only a matter of time before the sport's popularity made the short trip across the Mississippi River and spread to the southern Illinois area. After the sport grew for years among local schools and smaller clubs, the Metro United Soccer Club was created in 1993 to elevate soccer in southern Illinois to a new level by providing a thorough and professional level of training for boys and girls of all ages and abilities. Complete and effective soccer instruction was the organizational focus of Metro United FC, and to maximize player development, the club remains committed to offering the best possible developmental environment combined with the highest level of competition available. As a result, the club has won more than 300 various competitions since its inception in 1993... and in 2006, Metro United FC was invited to participate – along with Scott Gallagher SC – in the inaugural season of the U.S. Soccer Development Academy Program.

== Facilities ==
The club trains and hosts matches at several facilities in and around St. Louis. Major training complexes and stadiums associated with the club include:

- World Wide Technology Soccer Park, 1 Soccer Park Rd, Fenton, MO 63026
- SLSG Collinsville Complex, 1046 McDonough Lake Rd, Collinsville, IL 62234
- Creve Coeur Park Soccer Complex, 2350 Creve Coeur Mill Rd, Maryland Heights, MO 63043

== Saint Louis FC ==
A unit of the organization, SLSG Pro LLC, owned and operated Saint Louis FC, a team in the USL Championship that played home matches in the 5,500 seat Toyota Stadium at World Wide Technology Soccer Park. After six seasons (2015-2020), Saint Louis FC disbanded after the 2020 season because of COVID-19 concerns and to make way for St. Louis City SC of Major League Soccer.

Starting in 2021 the club fielded a team in USL League Two which finished 3rd in the Heartland division with a 6-4-2 record and did not qualify for the playoffs.

== Year-by-year ==
| Year | Division | League | Regular season (W–D–L) | Playoffs | Open Cup |
|---|---|---|---|---|---|
| 2015 | 2 | USL | 9th, Eastern (8–9–11) | did not qualify | 4th Round |
| 2016 | 2 | USL | 14th, Western (8–10–12) | did not qualify | 3rd Round |
| 2017 | 2 | USL | 12th, Eastern (9–9–14) | did not qualify | 4th Round |
| 2018 | 2 | USL | 8th, Western (14–11–9) | Conference Quarter-Finals | 3rd Round |
| 2019 | 2 | USL | 11th, Eastern (11–9–14) | did not qualify | Quarter-Finals |
| 2020 | 2 | USL | 2nd, Eastern Group E (7–4–5) | Conference Semi-Finals | Cancelled |
| 2021 | 4 | USL2 | 3rd, Heartland (6–2–4) | did not qualify | Ineligible |

== Notable Graduates ==
Names in bold have represented their national teams.

- (United States) Mike Ambersley
- (United States) Tom Barlow
- (United States) Brian Bement
- (United States) **Will Bruin**
- (United States) Matt Caution
- (United States) A. J. Cochran
- (United States) **Brad Davis**
- (United States) Maddie DiMaria
- (United States) Sam Fink
- (United States) Channing Foster
- (United States) Caden Glover
- (United States) Tomás Gómez
- (United States) Jarius Holmes
- (Japan) Ko Ise
- (United States) Mykhi Joyner
- (United States) Kevin Kalish
- (United States) Jim Kavanaugh
- (United States) Kipp Keller
- (United States) **Chris Klein**
- (United States) Luke Kreamalmeyer
- (Bosnia and Herzegovina) Robert Kristo
- (Malaysia) Wan Kuzain
- (United States) Jake Leeker
- (United States) Austin Ledbetter
- (United States) Sarah Luebbert
- (United States) Jack Lynn
- (United States) Jack Maher
- (United States) Jansen Miller
- (United States) Daniel Munie
- (United States) Chase Niece
- (United States) **Pat Noonan**
- (United States) Aris Nukić
- (United States) Austin Panchot
- (United States) Logan Panchot
- (United States) Mark Pais
- (United States) Tyson Pearce
- (United States) Alex Pfeiffer
- (United States) **Steve Ralston**
- (United States) **Tim Ream**
- (United States) Mike Roach
- (United States) Seth Rudolph
- (United States) **Mark Santel**
- (United States) **Josh Sargent**
- (United States) **Patrick Schulte**
- (United States) **Frank Simek**
- (United States) **Mike Sorber**
- (United States) Connor Sparrow
- (United States) Aedan Stanley
- (United States) **Steve Trittschuh**
- (United States) **Taylor Twellman**
- (United States) Chad Vandegriffe
- (United States) Nichi Vlastos
- (United States) Joe Willis
- (United States) Kristen Davis

== Community Programs ==
The club supports several community-focused initiatives aimed at expanding access to soccer and assisting local families. These efforts include the Upper 90 Program, the Living Legacy Scholarship Fund, and the SLSG Foundation, each of which contributes to player development, community engagement, and financial support for youth participation in the sport.

Upper 90 Program

The club operates the Upper 90 Program, a voluntary, team-driven initiative that combines fundraising with community service. The program encourages players to design and lead their own fundraising projects in support of local youth who may not have the financial means to participate in organized soccer.

Funds raised through the Upper 90 Program directly support the club's South Side City Program, which provides year-round training, games, and equipment for under-resourced children in the St. Louis area.

Participating teams organize activities such as bake sales, car washes, lemonade stands, and other community events. The initiative aims to promote leadership, teamwork, and social responsibility while expanding access to soccer opportunities for local youth.

The Living Legacy Scholarship Fund

The club administers the Living Legacy Scholarship Fund, an initiative established to support SLSG players through full or partial financial assistance. The fund is named in recognition of individuals who have made notable contributions to the club and who are honored through induction into the Living Legacy Hall of Fame.

Scholarship recipients are selected by a committee composed of members from both within and outside the SLSG community. Selection criteria generally include financial need, character, and commitment to the sport.

To recognize Hall of Fame inductees and scholarship recipients, the club organizes two annual events: Living Legacy Night and the Living Legacy Match. Living Legacy Night features presentations and stories highlighting inductees’ contributions to the club, while the Living Legacy Match includes community activities and a collegiate soccer game that also serves as a fundraising opportunity for the scholarship fund.

Through these events and the associated scholarship program, the Living Legacy Fund aims to support player development and acknowledge individuals who have played a significant role in the club's history.
