= Seth Rudolph =

American soccer player

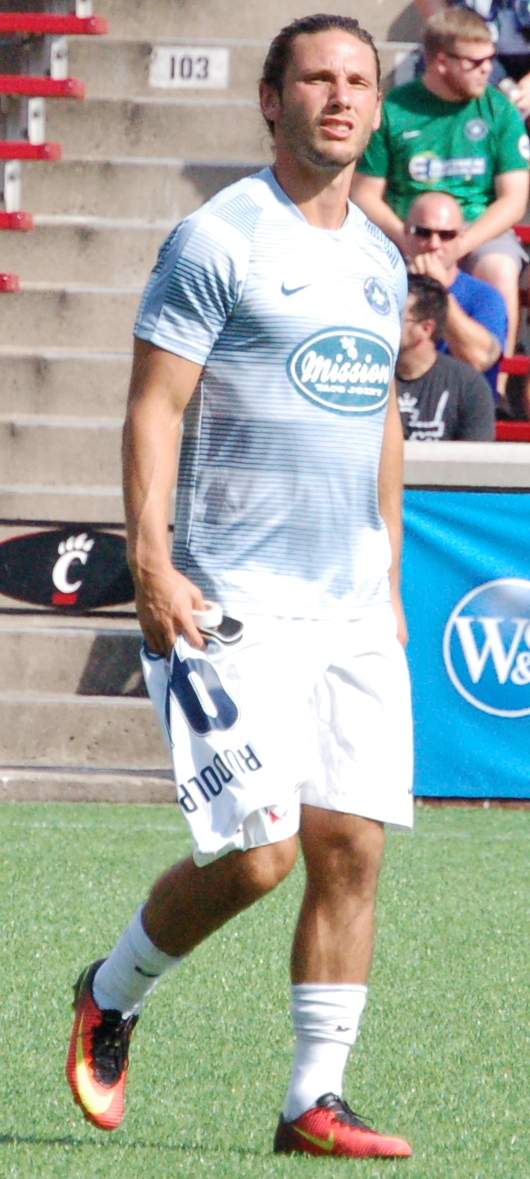
- Rudolph playing for Saint Louis FC in 2016

Personal information
- Full name: Seth Zechariah Rudolph
- Date of birth: May 7, 1991 (age 35)
- Place of birth: Belleville, Illinois, United States
- Height: 1.70 m (5 ft 7 in)
- Position: Attacking midfielder

Youth career
- St. Louis Scott Gallagher

College career
Years	Team	Apps	(Gls)
2009–2012	George Washington Colonials	70	(29)

Senior career*
Years	Team	Apps	(Gls)
2013–2015	Sandvikens IF	33	(8)
2016–2017	Saint Louis FC	31	(9)
2018	Saint Louis FC	8	(1)
- * Club domestic league appearances and goals as of 17:24, 17 October 2018 (UTC)

Seth Zechariah Rudolph (born May 7, 1991) is an American soccer player.

== Career ==
=== College ===
Rudolph played college soccer at George Washington University between 2009 and 2012, where he ranked 7th of all time with 29 career goals.

=== Professional ===
Rudolph signed with Swedish side Sandvikens IF in the summer of 2013 after a trial with the club.

He signed with United Soccer League side Saint Louis FC on April 22, 2016.
