= 2026 FC Dallas season =

FC Dallas
2026 season
- Owner: Clark and Dan Hunt
- Head coach: Eric Quill
- Stadium: Toyota Stadium
- MLS: Conference: 2nd Overall: 5th
- MLS Cup playoffs: Round one
- Leagues Cup: League phase
- Top goalscorer: League: Petar Musa (22); All: Petar Musa (23)
- Highest home attendance: 11,004; Multiple games
- Average home league attendance: 10,969
- Biggest win: 4–0 (April 4 vs. D.C. United)
- Biggest defeat: 0–5 (August 22 vs. Vancouver Whitecaps FC)
Primary colors	Alternate colors

The 2026 FC Dallas season is the Major League Soccer club's 31st season and second under head coach Eric Quill.

Due to renovations at Toyota Stadium, home match capacity is reduced to around 11,000.

== Transfers ==
=== In ===
No.	Pos.	Nat.	Name	Age	Moving from	Type	Transfer window	Ends	Transfer fee	Source
6	MF	(Israel)	Ran Binyamin	21	Hapoel Tel Aviv F.C. (Israel)	Transfer	Pre-season		Signed to a U22 Initiative contract through the 2028-29 Major League Soccer season with club options for the 2029-30 and 2030-31 season	
14	DF	(Sweden)	Herman Johansson	28	Mjällby AIF (Sweden)	Transfer	Pre-season		Signed to contract through the 2029-30 Major League Soccer season	
20	FW	(United States)	Jaidyn Contreras	18	North Texas SC (United States)	Transfer	Pre-season		Signed as a Homegrown Player	
34	MF	(Brazil)	Kaka Scabin	19	North Texas SC (United States)	Transfer	Pre-season		Signed as a Homegrown Player	
26	DF	(United States)	Slade Starnes	22	SMU (United States)	Transfer	Pre-season		Signed as a Homegrown Player	
27	MF	(United States)	Caleb Swann	18	North Texas SC (United States)	Transfer	Pre-season		Signed as a Homegrown Player	
40	GK	(Canada)	Jonathan Sirois	24	CF Montréal (Canada)	Trade	Pre-season		Acquired in exchange for a total of up to $350,000 in General Allocation Money ($75,000 in 2026 GAM, $75,000 in 2027 GAM and up to $200k GAM in performance insentive metrics)	
21	MF	(Uruguay)	Joaquín Valiente	24	Defensor Sporting (Uruguay)	Transfer	Pre-season		Signed through the 2027-2028 season with club options for the 2028-2029 and 2029-2030 seasons	
31	GK	(United States)	Brooks Thompson	23	Lexington SC (United States)	Loan	Pre-season		On loan from USL Championship side Lexington SC until June 2026 with a club option for a permanent transfer	
10	FW	(Colombia)	Santiago Moreno	25	Fluminense FC (Brazil)	Loan	Mid-season		On loan from Fluminense FC through the 2026 MLS season with a purchase option and trades $75,000 in 2026 GAM and $50,000 in conditional GAM to the Philadelphia Union to move up the waiver order	
42	GK	(Brazil)	Daniel	32	San Jose Earthquakes (United States)	Transfer	Mid-season		Acquired goalkeeper Daniel from the San Jose Earthquakes in exchange for up to $1 million in General Allocation Money, including $300,000 in 2026 GAM, $400,000 in 2027 GAM and up to $300,000 in conditional GAM if certain performance metrics are met	
31	FW	(United States)	Benji Flowers	15	FC Dallas Academy (United States)	Transfer	Mid-season		Signed FC Dallas Academy forward Benjamin Flowers to a Homegrown contract through 2030-31 with a club option for 2031-32	
33	MF	(United States)	Clay Holstad	26	Rhode Island FC (United States)	Loan	Mid-season		On loan from Rhode Island FC through Dec. 2026, with a club option for a permanent transfer	
7	FW	(Nigeria)	Daniel Job	26	Kongsvinger IL (Norway)	Transfer	Mid-season		Signed to a U22 Initiative contract through the 2029-2030 Major League Soccer season with a club option for the 2030-31 season. As part of the transaction, FC Dallas acquired Job’s Discovery; Priority from Red Bull New York in exchange for $125,000 in 2027 General Allocation Money (GAM).	

==== Draft picks ====
Round	Selection	Pos.	Name	College	Signed	Source
1	2 (Note: Atlanta United → FC Dallas. FC Dallas acquired Atlanta's pick.)	FW	(Haiti) Ricky Louis	Georgia Southern	Signed	
1	3 (Note: CF Montréal → FC Dallas. FC Dallas acquired the natural first round pick and Toronto FC's natural third round pick in the 2026 MLS SuperDraft from CF Montréal in exchange for FC Dallas' natural second round pick in the 2026 MLS SuperDraft, $175,000 in 2026 GAM and $175,000 in 2027 GAM.)	FW	(Jamaica) Nicholas Simmonds	Virginia	Signed	
1	16	GK	(Germany) Niklas Herceg	Vermont	Unsigned	
2	40 (Note: Colorado Rapids → FC Dallas. FC Dallas acquired the natural second round pick in the 2026 MLS SuperDraft from Colorado Rapids.)	MF	(Belgium) Edouard Nys	UIC	Signed with North Texas SC	
2	44 (Note: Colorado Rapids → Sporting KC → Orlando City → FC Dallas. FC Dallas acquired the natural second round pick in the 2026 MLS SuperDraft from Orlando City SC.)	MF	(Italy) Umberto Pelà	Virginia	Signed with North Texas SC	
3	6 (Note: Toronto FC → CF Montréal → FC Dallas. CF Montréal acquired the natural third round pick in the 2026 MLS SuperDraft and $75,000 in conditionl GAM from Toronto FC in exchange for the MLS rights to Malik Henry. For the subsequent trade to FC Dallas see Round 1: CF Montréal → FC Dallas)	DF	(United States) Olayinka Ogunleye	Louisville	Unsigned	

=== Out ===
No.	Pos.	Nat.	Name	Age	Moving to	Type	Transfer window	Transfer fee	Source
27	FW	(United States)	Herbert Endeley	24	Forward Madison FC (United States)	Option Declined	Pre-season	Free	
8	MF	(United States)	Sebastian Lletget	33	Monterey Bay FC (United States)	Option Declined	Pre-season	Free	
20	FW	(Brazil)	Pedrinho	22	Maccabi Netanya (Israel)	Option Declined	Pre-season	Free	
--	FW	(United States)	Diego Pepi	21	n/a	Option Declined	Pre-season	Free	
--	FW	(United States)	Tomas Pondeca	24	Corpus Christi FC (United States)	Option Declined	Pre-season	Free	
--	DF	(Haiti)	Carl Sainté	23	El Paso Locomotive FC (United States)	Option Declined	Pre-season	Free	
51	MF	(Mexico)	Anthony Ramirez	20	n/a	Option Declined	Pre-season	Free	
41	FW	(Jamaica)	Tarik Scott	20	Lexington SC (United States)	Option Declined	Pre-season	Free	
34	MF	(United States)	Alejandro Urzua	20	Atlante F.C. (Mexico)	Option Declined	Pre-season	Free	
98	GK	(United States)	Jacob Jackson	25	San Diego FC (United States)	Contract Expired	Pre-season	Free	
1	GK	(Indonesia)	Maarten Paes	27	Ajax (Netherlands)	Transfer	Pre-season	Undisclosed	
19	MF	(United States)	Paxton Pomykal	26	n/a	Contract Buyout	Pre-season	Free	
--	MF	(South Africa)	Tsiki Ntsabeleng	28	Mamelodi Sundowns F.C. (South Africa)	Transfer	Mid-season	Free	
--	MF	(Romania)	Enes Sali	20	FC Andorra	Transfer	Mid-season	Free	
7	MF	(Haiti)	Louicius Deedson	25	FC Sochaux-Montbéliard (France)	Transfer	Mid-season	Free	
2	DF	(Brazil)	Geovane Jesus	25	n/a	Waived	Mid-season	Free	

== Club ==
=== Roster ===
As of September 17, 2026

Note: Flags indicate national team as defined under FIFA eligibility rules; some limited exceptions apply. Players may hold more than one non-FIFA nationality.

No.	Pos.	Nation	Player
3	DF	ENG	Osaze Urhoghide
5	DF	GHA	Lalas Abubakar
6	MF	ISR	Ran Binyamin
7	FW	NGR	Daniel Job
8	MF	ECU	Patrickson Delgado
9	FW	CRO	Petar Musa (DP)
10	FW	COL	Santiago Moreno (DP) (on loan from Fluminense FC)
11	FW	ECU	Anderson Julio
12	MF	USA	Christian Cappis
14	DF	SWE	Herman Johansson
15	MF	HAI	Ricky Louis (GA)
16	FW	JAM	Nicholas Simmonds (GA)
17	MF	BRA	Ramiro
18	DF	USA	Shaq Moore
21	MF	URU	Joaquín Valiente
22	DF	BRA	Álvaro Augusto
23	FW	USA	Logan Farrington

No.	Pos.	Nation	Player
24	DF	USA	Joshua Torquato (HG)
25	DF	USA	Sebastien Ibeagha
26	DF	USA	Slade Starnes (HG)
27	MF	USA	Caleb Swann (HG)
28	FW	USA	Sam Sarver
29	DF	USA	Enzo Newman
30	GK	USA	Michael Collodi (HG)
31	FW	USA	Benji Flowers (HG)
32	DF	USA	Nolan Norris (HG)
33	MF	USA	Clay Holstad (on loan from Rhode Island FC)
34	DF	BRA	Kaka Scabin (HG)
36	FW	POL	Daniel Baran (HG)
40	GK	CAN	Jonathan Sirois
42	GK	BRA	Daniel
50	MF	USA	Diego García (HG)
55	MF	BRA	Kaick
77	MF	TAN	Bernard Kamungo

=== Out on loan ===
Note: Flags indicate national team as defined under FIFA eligibility rules; some limited exceptions apply. Players may hold more than one non-FIFA nationality.

No.	Pos.	Nation	Player
—	DF	JAM	Malachi Molina (HG) (on loan to Nashville SC)
20	FW	HON	Jaidyn Contreras (HG) (on loan to Tigres UANL)

== Competitions ==
=== Preseason ===
January 21 International Friendly	FC Dallas	4–0	Portimonense S.C.	Portimão, Portugal
9:45AM CST (UTC-06)	Julio 38'; Louis 45'; Kaick 52'; Cappis 58'	Report		Stadium: Estádio Municipal de Portimão

January 26 Atlantic Cup	FC Dallas	5–2	Brøndby IF	Loulé, Portugal
1:30PM CST (UTC-06)	Ibeagha 33'; Farrington 46', 52'; Johansson 62'; Simmonds 86'	Report	58'; 80' (pen.)	Stadium: Estádio Algarve

January 30 Atlantic Cup	FC Dallas	2–0	Real Salt Lake	Albufeira, Portugal
5:00AM CST (UTC-06)	Musa 46'; Julio 90+4'; Louis 90+23'	Report	Wolff 90+33'	Stadium: Estádio da Nora

February 7 Torneo de Tejas	FC Dallas	3–2	Red Bull New York	Frisco, Texas
1:00PM CST (UTC-06)	Farrington 21'; Julio 45'; Sarver 80' (pen.)	Report	Ruvalcaba (red card) 57'; Hall 90+14'; Rojas 90+21'	Stadium: Toyota Stadium
Note: There was a third half played during this match.

February 11 Torneo de Tejas	FC Dallas	1–2	Houston Dynamo FC	Frisco, Texas
11:00AM CST (UTC-06)	Delgado 79'	Report	45'; 81'	Stadium: Toyota Soccer Center Field 1

February 14 Torneo de Tejas	FC Dallas	Canceled	Atlanta United FC	Frisco, Texas
12:00PM CST (UTC-06)		Report		Stadium: Toyota Stadium
Note: Match canceled due to weather

=== MLS ===
==== Western Conference standings ====
Western Conference

MLS Western Conference table (2026)
Pos	Team	Pld	W	L	T	GF	GA	GD	Pts	Qualification
1	Vancouver Whitecaps FC	34	19	8	7	74	34	+40	64	Qualification for round one and the CONCACAF Champions Cup round one
2	FC Dallas	34	16	8	10	62	51	+11	58	Qualification for round one
3	St. Louis City SC	34	15	10	9	59	48	+11	54	Qualification for round one
4	San Jose Earthquakes	34	14	10	10	57	51	+6	52	Qualification for round one
5	Houston Dynamo FC	34	14	11	9	43	43	0	51	Qualification for round one

Source: MLS
Rules for classification: 1) points; 2) total wins; 3) total goal differential; 4) total goals scored; 5) fewer disciplinary points; 6) away goal differential; 7) away goals scored; 8) home goals differential; 9) home goals scored; 10) coin toss (2 clubs tied) or drawing of lots (≥3 clubs tied)

==== Overall standings ====
Overall MLS standings table
Pos	Team	Pld	W	L	T	GF	GA	GD	Pts	Qualification
3	Inter Miami CF	34	16	6	12	80	59	+21	60	Qualification for the CONCACAF Champions Cup round one (Note: As one of the next two highest-ranked clubs in 2026 MLS Supporters' Shield not already qualified)
4	New England Revolution	34	18	12	4	55	47	+8	58	Qualification for the CONCACAF Champions Cup round one
5	FC Dallas	34	16	8	10	62	51	+11	58	
6	Chicago Fire FC	34	16	11	7	64	54	+10	55	
7	Charlotte FC	34	15	10	9	66	51	+15	54	

Source: MLS
Rules for classification: 1) points; 2) total wins; 3) total goal differential; 4) total goals scored; 5) fewer disciplinary points; 6) away goal differential; 7) away goals scored; 8) home goals differential; 9) home goals scored; 10) coin toss (2 clubs tied) or drawing of lots (≥3 clubs tied)

==== Results summary ====
Overall								Home						Away					
Pld	W	D	L	GF	GA	GD	Pts	W	D	L	GF	GA	GD	W	D	L	GF	GA	GD
34	16	10	8	62	51	+11	58	9	5	3	32	23	+9	7	5	5	30	28	+2

Last updated: November 7, 2026.
Source: Regular season

==== Results by round ====
Round	1	2	3	4	5	6	7	8	9	10	11	12	13	14	15	16	17	18	19	20	21	22	23	24	25	26	27	28	29	30	31	32	33	34
Ground	H	H	A	H	H	A	H	H	H	A	A	H	H	A	A	A	A	A	A	A	A	A	H	A	H	H	H	A	H	A	H	H	A	H
Result	W	D	L	D	W	W	D	D	L	L	W	W	L	W	W	D	L	D	W	W	L	D	W	W	W	D	W	L	W	D	W	L	D	W

Updated to match(es) played on November 7, 2026. Source: Regular Season
A = Away; H = Home; W = Win; D = Draw; L = Loss; P = Postponed

==== Regular season ====
Kickoff times are in CDT (UTC-05) unless shown otherwise

February 21 1	FC Dallas	3–2	Toronto FC	Frisco, Texas
7:30PM CST (UTC-06)	Musa 9', 74' (yellow card) 45+4'; Farrington 38'	Report	Mihailovic 15'; Henry (yellow card) 21'; Etienne Jr. 67'; Edwards (yellow card) 90+4'	Stadium: Toyota Stadium; Attendance: 11,004; Referee: Timothy Ford

February 28 2	FC Dallas	0–0	Nashville FC	Frisco, Texas
7:30PM CST (UTC-06)	Kaick (yellow card) 51'; Urhoghide (yellow card) 76'; Sarver (yellow card) 90+5'	Report	Corcoran (yellow card) 74' (yellow-red card) 84'; Lovitz (yellow card) 76'	Stadium: Toyota Stadium; Attendance: 11,004; Referee: Sergii Boiko

March 7 3	Los Angeles FC	1–0	FC Dallas	Los Angeles, California
9:30PM CST (UTC-06)	Son (yellow card) 10'; Martínez 55'; Boyd (yellow card) 82'	Report	Moore (yellow card) 45'; Ramiro (yellow card) 60'	Stadium: BMO Stadium; Attendance: 22,130; Referee: Drew Fischer

March 14 4	FC Dallas	3–3	San Diego FC	Frisco, Texas
7:30PM CDT (UTC-05)	Cappis (yellow card) 23'; Johansson (yellow card) 30'; Musa 41', 54', 90+5'; Farrington (yellow card) 90+10'	Report	Valakari 21' (pen.), 51'; Ingvartsen 31' (pen.); Soma (yellow card) 40'; Bombino (yellow card) 86'	Stadium: Toyota Stadium; Attendance: 11,004; Referee: Ricardo Montero

March 21 5 Texas Derby	FC Dallas	4–3	Houston Dynamo FC	Frisco, Texas
7:30PM CDT (UTC-05)	Farrington 6', 14'; Urhoghide (yellow card) 19'; Holmes 54' (o.g.); Kaick (yellow card) 57'; Musa 86'	Report	Guilherme 29'; Sviatchenko 31', (yellow card) 45' (yellow-red card) 68'; Ennali 33'; Ponce (yellow card) 38'; Holmes (yellow card) 46'	Stadium: Toyota Stadium; Attendance: 11,004; Referee: Rosendo Mendoza

April 4 6	D.C. United	0–4	FC Dallas	Washington D.C.
6:30PM CDT (UTC-05)	Bartlett (yellow card) 45'; Herrera (yellow card) 83'	Report	Farrington 16'; Delgado 45+1'; Norris (yellow card) 67'; Urhoghide 78'; Musa 90+1'	Stadium: Audi Field; Attendance: 19,215; Referee: Rubiel Vazquez

April 11 7	FC Dallas	1–1	St. Louis City SC	Frisco, Texas
7:30PM CDT (UTC-05)	Cappis (yellow card) 40'; Urhoghide (yellow card) 40'; Deedson 48'; Collodi (yellow card) 58'	Report	Córdova (yellow card) 32'; Baumgartl 61'	Stadium: Toyota Stadium; Attendance: 11,004; Referee: Filip Dujic

April 18 8	FC Dallas	2–2	LA Galaxy	Frisco, Texas
7:30PM CDT (UTC-05)	Musa 7', 38'; Ibeagha (yellow card) 28'; Johansson (yellow card) 83'	Report	Sanabria 43'; Paintsil 45+3'	Stadium: Toyota Stadium; Attendance: 11,004; Referee: Marcos de Oliveira

April 22 9	FC Dallas	0–1	Minnesota United FC	Frisco, Texas
7:30PM CDT (UTC-05)	Moreno (yellow card) 41'; Norris (yellow card) 57'	Report	Markanich (yellow card) 4', (goal) 32'; Duggan (yellow card) 50'; Romero (yellow card) 73'	Stadium: Toyota Stadium; Attendance: 11,004; Referee: Allen Chapman

April 25 10	Seattle Sounders FC	2–1	FC Dallas	Seattle, Washington
9:30PM CDT (UTC-05)	Ferreira 15'; Morris 30'; Kingston (yellow card) 82'	Report	Simmonds (yellow card) 27'; Norris 40', (yellow card) 89'; Delgado (yellow card) 45+3'; Abubakar (yellow card) 52'	Stadium: Lumen Field; Attendance: 31,785; Referee: Tori Penso

May 2 11	New York Red Bulls	0–2	FC Dallas	Harrison, New Jersey
6:30PM CDT (UTC-05)		Report	Collodi (yellow card) 31'; Musa 54'; Sarver 88', (yellow card) 88'	Stadium: Sports Illustrated Stadium; Attendance: 20,414; Referee: Jair Marrufo

May 9 12	FC Dallas	3–1	Real Salt Lake	Frisco, Texas
7:30PM CDT (UTC-05)	Moreno 18'; Urhoghide (yellow card) 23'; Kaick 24'; Sarver 90+2', (yellow card) 90+4'	Report	Guilavogui (yellow card) 35'; Luna (yellow card) 45+1', (goal) 85'; Yedlin (yellow card) 82'	Stadium: Toyota Stadium; Attendance: 11,004; Referee: Joe Dickerson

May 13 13	FC Dallas	2–3	Vancouver Whitecaps FC	Frisco, Texas
7:30PM CDT (UTC-05)	Musa 10' (pen.); Binyamin (yellow card) 12'; Moore (yellow card) 14'; Farrington 49', (yellow card) 60'	Report	Blackmon (yellow card) 7'; Berhalter 23', 64'; Urhoghide 40' (o.g.); Sabaly (yellow card) 45+9'; Ocampo (yellow card) 79'; Cabrera (yellow card) 90+4'	Stadium: Toyota Stadium; Attendance: 11,004; Referee: Rosendo Mendoza

May 16 14	San Jose Earthquakes	2–3	FC Dallas	San Jose, California
9:30PM CDT (UTC-05)	Leroux 18'; Munie (yellow card) 48'; Roberts 81'; Kikanović (yellow card) 85'; Daniel (yellow card) 90+4'	Report	Delgado 1'; Musa 49'; Ramiro (yellow card) 62'; Norris (yellow card) 90+1'; Cappis (yellow card) 90+3'; Sarver 90+3'	Stadium: PayPal Park; Attendance: 18,000; Referee: Chris Penso

May 23 15	Colorado Rapids	1–2	FC Dallas	Commerce City, Colorado
8:30PM CDT (UTC-05)	Aaronson 13', (yellow card) 73'; Herrington (yellow card) 45+4'; Navarro (yellow card) 70'; Frederick (red card) 87'	Report	Farrington 12' (pen.), (yellow card) 45+4'; Moreno 45' (pen.); Delgado (yellow card) 50'; Sarver (yellow card) 90+1'	Stadium: Dick's Sporting Goods Park; Attendance: 17,142; Referee: Ismail Elfath

July 22 16	Portland Timbers	2–2	FC Dallas	Portland, Oregon
9:30PM CDT (UTC-05)	Miller (yellow card) 38'; Kelsy 66'; Bye (yellow card) 90'; Mora 90+2'; Chará (yellow card) 90+4'	Report	Delgado 45+1'; Johansson (yellow card) 58'; Musa 88'; Ibeagha (yellow card) 90+6'	Stadium: Providence Park; Attendance: 20,184; Referee: Alexis Da Silva

July 25 17	San Diego FC	1–0	FC Dallas	San Diego, California
8:30PM CDT (UTC-05)	Alvarado 50'	Report	Kamungo (yellow card) 81'; Julio (yellow card) 88'	Stadium: Snapdragon Stadium; Attendance: 24,489; Referee: Victor Rivas

August 1 18	LA Galaxy	0–0	FC Dallas	Carson, California
9:30PM CDT (UTC-05)	Glesnes (yellow card) 53'; Nelson (yellow card) 86'	Report	Delgado (yellow card) 4'; Cappis (yellow card) 31'; Kaick (yellow card) 35'; Norris (yellow card) 63'	Stadium: Dignity Health Sports Park; Attendance: 18,122; Referee: Fotis Bazakos

August 16 19 Copa Tejas	Austin FC	1–2	FC Dallas	Austin, Texas
7:30PM CDT (UTC-05)	Djordjević (yellow card) 35'; Torres 57'; Svatok (yellow card) 68'; Uzuni (yellow card) 90+9'	Report	Ramiro (yellow card) 33'; Abubakar 45+2'; Kamungo (yellow card) 60'; Valiente (yellow card) 63'; Musa 73'; Urhoghide (yellow card) 83'	Stadium: Q2 Stadium; Attendance: 20,738; Referee: Ramy Touchan

August 19 20	Real Salt Lake	3–4	FC Dallas	Sandy, Utah
8:30PM CDT (UTC-05)	Solans 38'; Guilavogui 50'; Luna (yellow card) 61', (goal) 64'; Yedlin (yellow card) 75'; Ruiz (yellow card) 90'	Report	Valiente 17'; Musa 20', 45'; Norris (yellow card) 38'; Moore (yellow card) 43'; Binyamin 90+1' (yellow card) 90+2'	Stadium: America First Field; Attendance: 20,632; Referee: Armando Villarreal

August 22 21	Vancouver Whitecaps FC	5–0	FC Dallas	Vancouver, British Columbia
8:30PM CDT (UTC-05)	Sabbi 11'; White 23', 37'; Ocampo 45+6'; Caicedo 68'; Laborda (yellow card) 90+3'	Report	Moore (yellow card) 7'; Binyamin (yellow card) 31'; Torquato (yellow card) 42'; Abubakar (yellow card) 59'	Stadium: BC Place; Attendance: 25,398; Referee: Malik Badawi

August 30 22	St. Louis City SC	3–3	FC Dallas	St. Louis, Missouri
6:00PM CDT (UTC-05)	Becher 4'; Edelman 43'; Holse 64'; MacNaughton (yellow card) 90+7'	Report	Ramiro (yellow card) 14'; Moore 18'; Ibeagha 81'; Musa (yellow card) 89'; Farrington 90+7'	Stadium: Energizer Park; Attendance: 22,243; Referee: Jair Marrufo

September 5 23	FC Dallas	4–3	Sporting Kansas City	Frisco, Texas
7:30PM CDT (UTC-05)	Farrington 27'; Musa 30', 90+7' (pen.); Kaick 45'	Report	Calheira 4', 78'; Afrifa 19'; Mosquera (yellow card) 88'; Karić (yellow card) 90+10'	Stadium: Toyota Stadium; Attendance: 10,925; Referee: Lorenzo Hernandez

September 9 24	Minnesota United FC	1–2	FC Dallas	Saint Paul, Minnesota
7:30PM CDT (UTC-05)	Triantis (yellow card) 69'; Yeboah 73'; Gene (yellow card) 89'	Report	Urhoghide (yellow card) 7'; Kaick 62'; Ramiro (yellow card) 83'; Moreno 84'	Stadium: Allianz Field; Attendance: 18,109; Referee: Ricardo Fierro

September 12 25	FC Dallas	2–1	Portland Timbers	Frisco, Texas
7:30PM CDT (UTC-05)	Farrington 45'; Kaick (yellow card) 47'; Valiente 87'	Report	Lassiter 90+3'	Stadium: Toyota Stadium; Attendance: 10,925; Referee: Timothy Ford

September 19 26 Copa Tejas	FC Dallas	0–0	Austin FC	Frisco, Texas
7:30PM CDT (UTC-05)	Moore (yellow card) 35'; Ramiro (yellow card) 90+7'	Report	Desler (yellow card) 2'; Rosales (yellow card) 48'	Stadium: Toyota Stadium; Attendance: 10,925; Referee: Allen Chapman

September 26 27	FC Dallas	1–0	Los Angeles FC	Frisco, Texas
7:30PM CDT (UTC-05)	Urhoghide 34'; Johansson (yellow card) 71'; Norris (yellow card) 90+2'	Report	Sieb (yellow card) 24'; Porteous (yellow card) 44'; Delgado (yellow card) 84'; Raposo (yellow card) 90+3'	Stadium: Toyota Stadium; Attendance: 10,925; Referee: Sergii Boiko

October 10 28	Charlotte FC	3–2	FC Dallas	Charlotte, North Carolina
6:30PM CDT (UTC-05)	Toklomati 70', 90+2'; Toffolo 74'; Agyemang (yellow card) 86'	Report	Farrington 22'; Musa 64'; Urhoghide (yellow card) 79'	Stadium: Bank of America Stadium; Attendance: 28,536; Referee: Drew Fischer

October 14 29	FC Dallas	1–0	Seattle Sounders FC	Frisco, Texas
7:30PM CDT (UTC-05)	Kaick 63'; Delgado (yellow card) 81'; Daniel (yellow card) 90+8'	Report		Stadium: Toyota Stadium; Attendance: 10,925; Referee: Jon Freemon

October 17 30 Texas Derby	Houston Dynamo FC	2–2	FC Dallas	Houston, Texas
7:30PM CDT (UTC-05)	Resch (yellow card) 27'; Negri (yellow card) 28'; Herrera 49'; Samassékou (yellow card) 60'; Halter (yellow card) 90'; Bogusz 90+4' (pen.) (yellow card) 90+8'	Report	Cappis 12'; Ibeagha (yellow card) 59'; Musa 90+11' (pen.); Sarver (red card) 90+12'	Stadium: Shell Energy Stadium; Attendance: 20,112; Referee: Victor Rivas

October 24 31	FC Dallas	3–0	San Jose Earthquakes	Frisco, Texas
7:30PM CDT (UTC-05)	Musa 83', 88' (pen.); Moreno 90+4'	Report	Roberts (yellow card) 29'; Gunn (yellow card) 64'	Stadium: Toyota Stadium; Attendance: 10,925; Referee: Rubiel Vazquez

October 28 32	FC Dallas	0–2	Columbus Crew	Frisco, Texas
7:30PM CDT (UTC-05)	Norris (yellow card) 16'; Moore (yellow card) 31'; Cappis (yellow card) 83'; Johansson (yellow card) 87'	Report	Tapia 18'; Rodríguez 70'; Herrera (yellow card) 90+6'	Stadium: Toyota Stadium; Attendance: 10,925; Referee: Sergii Demianchuk

October 31 33	Sporting Kansas City	1–1	FC Dallas	Kansas City, Kansas
2:00PM CDT (UTC-05)	Bartlett (yellow card) 39'; Miller 45+2'; Wolff (yellow card) 58'; Davis (yellow card) 64'	Report	Johansson 19'; Abubakar (yellow card) 26'; Ibeagha (yellow card) 53'; Urhoghide (yellow card) 83'; Sarver (yellow card) 89'	Stadium: Sporting Park; Attendance: 12,831; Referee: Fotis Bazakos

November 7 34	FC Dallas	3–1	Colorado Rapids	Frisco, Texas
6:00PM CST (UTC-06)	Valiente 75'; Kaick 89'; Moreno 90+3'	Report	Cobb (yellow card) 37'; Whittaker 47'; Thompson (yellow card) 90+5'	Stadium: Toyota Stadium; Attendance: 10,925; Referee: Drew Fischer

=== Mid-season exhibitions ===
Kickoff times are in CDT (UTC−05) unless shown otherwise

July 15 Friendly	FC Dallas	1–2	Orlando City SC	Mansfield, Texas
7:00PM CDT (UTC−05)	Moreno 90'	Report	Griezmann 9'; Ojeda 22'	Stadium: Texas Health Mansfield Stadium

=== MLS Cup Playoffs ===
==== Round one ====
November 21 Game 1	FC Dallas	3–0	Portland Timbers	Frisco, Texas
3:00 PM CST (UTC-06)	Johansson (yellow card) 32'; Valiente 53', 55'; Kamungo (yellow card) 90+1'; Sarver 90+4'	Report		Stadium: Toyota Stadium; Attendance: 10,925; Referee: Alexis Da Silva

November 28 Game 2	Portland Timbers	v	FC Dallas	Portland, Oregon
9:30 PM CST (UTC-06)				Stadium: Providence Park

December 2 Game 3 (If necessary)	FC Dallas	v	Portland Timbers	Frisco, Texas
TBD				Stadium: Toyota Stadium

=== Leagues Cup ===
==== League phase ====
August 5 1	FC Dallas (United States)	2–0	(Mexico) Querétaro	Mansfield, Texas
7:30PM CDT (UTC-05)	Moreno 47'; Musa (yellow card) 63'; Urhoghide (yellow card) 68'; Valiente 81'; Moore (yellow card) 90'	Report	Abascia (yellow card) 45+3'; Reyes (yellow card) 53'; Ávila (yellow card) 68'	Stadium: Texas Health Mansfield Stadium; Attendance: 4,335; Referee: Daniel Quintero

August 8 2	Guadalajara (Mexico)	0–1	(United States) FC Dallas	San Jose, California
8:00PM CDT (UTC-05)		Report	Farrington 73'; Kamungo (yellow card) 76'	Stadium: PayPal Park; Referee: Josué Ugalde

August 12 3	Toluca (Mexico)	3–1	(United States) FC Dallas	Toluca, Mexico
9:00PM CDT (UTC-05)	Vega 8' (pen.); Pereira (yellow card) 33'; Viñas 45+2'; Gutiérrez 50'	Report	Musa 9'; Ramiro (yellow card) 17'; Urhoghide (yellow card) 77'; Binyamin (yellow card) 79'; Sarver (yellow card) 90+1'	Stadium: Estadio Nemesio Díez; Referee: Walter López Castellanos
Note: FC Dallas eliminated at league phase of the competition

== Statistics ==
=== Appearances ===
Numbers outside parentheses denote appearances as starter.
Numbers in parentheses denote appearances as substitute.
Players with no appearances are not included in the list.

As of match played November 7, 2026

No.	Pos.	Nat.	Name	MLS	Leagues Cup	Total
No.	Pos.	Nat.	Name	Apps	Apps	Apps
3	DF	ENG	Osaze Urhoghide	28	2(1)	30(1)
5	DF	GHA	Lalas Abubakar	5(1)	0	5(1)
6	MF	ISR	Ran Binyamin	13(16)	(2)	13(18)
7	MF	NGR	Daniel Job	4(3)	0	4(3)
8	MF	ECU	Patrickson Delgado	12(10)	(1)	12(11)
9	FW	CRO	Petar Musa	24(6)	2(1)	26(7)
10	FW	COL	Santiago Moreno	15(14)	1(2)	15(16)
11	FW	ECU	Anderson Julio	(6)	1	1(6)
12	MF	USA	Christian Cappis	20(13)	1(2)	21(15)
14	DF	SWE	Herman Johansson	23(8)	3	26(8)
15	FW	USA	Ricky Louis	(1)	0	(1)
16	FW	JAM	Nicholas Simmonds	1(3)	(1)	1(4)
17	MF	BRA	Ramiro	26(2)	2(1)	28(3)
18	DF	USA	Shaq Moore	31(1)	2(1)	33(2)
21	MF	URU	Joaquín Valiente	24(8)	3	27(8)
23	FW	USA	Logan Farrington	17(11)	1(1)	18(12)
24	DF	USA	Joshua Torquato	1	0	1
25	DF	USA	Sebastien Ibeagha	24(9)	2	26(9)
27	MF	USA	Caleb Swann	(2)	0	(2)
28	FW	USA	Samuel Sarver	2(19)	1(1)	3(20)
30	GK	USA	Michael Collodi	13	0	13
32	DF	USA	Nolan Norris	21(4)	3	24(4)
33	MF	USA	Clay Holstad	(2)	1	1(2)
40	GK	CAN	Jonathan Sirois	11(1)	3	14(1)
42	GK	BRA	Daniel	10	0	10
55	MF	BRA	Kaick	27(6)	2(1)	29(7)
77	FW	TAN	Bernard Kamungo	19(5)	3	22(5)
Player(s) exiting club mid-season that made appearance
7	MF	HAI	Louicius Deedson	3(4)	0	3(4)

=== Goals and assists ===
As of match played November 7, 2026
Player name(s) in italics transferred out mid-season.

No.	Pos.	Name	MLS		Leagues Cup		Total	
No.	Pos.	Name	Goals	Assists	Goals	Assists	Goals	Assists
3	DF	(England) Osaze Urhoghide	2	3	0	0	2	3
5	DF	(Ghana) Lalas Abubakar	1	0	0	0	1	0
6	MF	(Israel) Ran Binyamin	1	3	0	0	1	3
7	FW	(Nigeria) Daniel Job	0	1	0	0	0	1
7	MF	(Haiti) Louicius Deedson	1	0	0	0	1	0
8	MF	(Ecuador) Patrickson Delgado	3	1	0	0	3	1
9	FW	(Croatia) Petar Musa	22	6	1	0	23	6
10	FW	(Colombia) Santiago Moreno	5	4	1	1	6	5
12	MF	(United States) Christian Cappis	1	1	0	0	1	1
14	DF	(Sweden) Herman Johansson	1	4	0	0	1	4
17	MF	(Brazil) Ramiro	0	4	0	0	0	4
18	DF	(United States) Shaq Moore	1	2	0	1	1	3
21	MF	(Uruguay) Joaquín Valiente	3	14	1	0	4	14
23	FW	(United States) Logan Farrington	10	6	1	0	11	6
25	DF	(United States) Sebastien Ibeagha	1	2	0	0	1	2
28	FW	(United States) Samuel Sarver	3	1	0	0	3	1
30	GK	(United States) Michael Collodi	0	1	0	0	0	1
32	DF	(United States) Nolan Norris	1	2	0	0	1	2
55	MF	(Brazil) Kaick	5	3	0	1	5	4
77	MF	(Tanzania) Bernard Kamungo	0	6	0	0	0	6
			1	0	0	0	1	0
Total			62	64	4	3	66	67

=== Disciplinary record ===
As of match played November 7, 2026

No.	Pos.	Name	MLS		Leagues Cup		Total	
No.	Pos.	Name	Yellow card	Red card	Yellow card	Red card	Yellow card	Red card
3	DF	(England) Osaze Urhoghide	8	0	2	0	10	0
5	DF	(Ghana) Lalas Abubakar	3	0	0	0	3	0
6	MF	(Israel) Ran Binyamin	3	0	1	0	4	0
8	MF	(Ecuador) Patrickson Delgado	4	0	0	0	4	0
9	FW	(Croatia) Petar Musa	2	0	1	0	3	0
10	FW	(Colombia) Santiago Moreno	1	0	0	0	1	0
11	FW	(Ecuador) Anderson Julio	1	0	0	0	1	0
12	MF	(United States) Christian Cappis	4	0	0	0	4	0
14	DF	(Sweden) Herman Johansson	5	0	0	0	5	0
16	FW	(Jamaica) Nicholas Simmonds	1	0	0	0	1	0
17	MF	(Brazil) Ramiro	6	0	1	0	7	0
18	DF	(United States) Shaq Moore	6	0	1	0	7	0
21	MF	(Uruguay) Joaquín Valiente	1	0	0	0	1	0
23	FW	(United States) Logan Farrington	3	0	0	0	3	0
24	DF	(United States) Joshua Torquato	1	0	0	0	1	0
25	DF	(United States) Sebastien Ibeagha	4	0	0	0	4	0
28	FW	(United States) Samuel Sarver	5	1	1	0	6	1
30	GK	(United States) Michael Collodi	2	0	0	0	2	0
32	DF	(United States) Nolan Norris	8	0	0	0	8	0
42	GK	(Brazil) Daniel	1	0	0	0	1	0
55	MF	(Brazil) Kaick	4	0	0	0	4	0
77	MF	(Tanzania) Bernard Kamungo	2	0	1	0	3	0
Total			75	1	8	0	83	1

=== Goalkeeper stats ===
As of match played November 7, 2026

No.	Name	Total				Major League Soccer				Leagues Cup			
No.	Name	MIN	GA	GAA	SV	MIN	GA	GAA	SV	MIN	GA	GAA	SV
30	(United States) Michael Collodi	1170	19	1.46	35	1170	19	1.46	35	0	0	0	0
40	(Canada) Jonathan Sirois	1332	24	1.6	68	1062	21	1.75	52	270	3	1	16
42	(Brazil) Daniel	828	11	1.1	25	828	11	1.1	25	0	0	0	0
	TOTALS	3330	54	1.46	128	3060	51	1.5	112	270	3	1	16

== Kits ==
Primary	Alternate

Type	Shirt	Shorts	Socks	First appearance / Info
Primary	Red/Dark Blue Hoops	Dark Blue / Red/White stripes	Red	MLS, February 21 against Toronto FC
Alternate	Light Blue / Red Flames	Light Blue	Light Blue	MLS, February 28 against Nashville SC
