= List of current Major League Soccer players with national team caps =

This is a list of current Major League Soccer players who have been capped at least once by their respective national team's first squad. Only national teams that are full members of FIFA are listed.

== Listed by MLS team ==
=== Atlanta United FC ===
- (Paraguay) Miguel Almirón
- (Paraguay) Júnior Alonso
- (Colombia) Steven Alzate
- (Switzerland) Breel Embolo
- (Trinidad and Tobago) Jay Fortune
- (Jamaica) Jayden Hibbert
- (Albania) Enea Mihaj
- (Russia) Aleksei Miranchuk
- (Haiti) (United States) Fafà Picault

=== Austin FC ===
- (Jamaica) Jon Bell
- (Poland) Przemysław Płacheta
- (United States) Christian Ramirez
- (Honduras) Joseph Rosales
- (Ukraine) Oleksandr Svatok
- (Uruguay) Facundo Torres
- (Albania) Myrto Uzuni
- (United States) Brandon Vázquez

=== Charlotte FC ===
- (Israel) Liel Abada
- (Benin) Rodolfo Aloko
- (United States) Luca de la Torre
- (United States) Henry Kessler
- (United States) Tim Ream
- (Austria) David Schnegg
- (Israel) Idan Toklomati

=== Chicago Fire ===
- (Ivory Coast) Jonathan Bamba
- (United States) Chris Brady
- (Poland) Robert Lewandowski
- (Finland) Robin Lod
- (South Africa) Mbekezeli Mbokazi
- (Georgia (country)) Anzor Mekvabishvili
- (United States) Sam Rogers
- (Sweden) Anton Salétros

=== FC Cincinnati ===
- (Czech Republic) Pavel Bucha
- (Togo) Kévin Denkey
- (Czech Republic) David Douděra
- (Venezuela) Ender Echenique
- (Zimbabwe) Teenage Hadebe
- (Netherlands) Tyrell Malacia
- (Jamaica) Alvas Powell
- (United States) Miles Robinson

=== Colorado Rapids ===
- (United States) Paxten Aaronson
- (United States) Josh Atencio
- (United States) Reggie Cannon
- (Trinidad and Tobago) Wayne Frederick
- (Burkina Faso) Georgi Minoungou
- (Venezuela) Miguel Navarro
- (Saint Lucia) Donavan Phillip
- (United States) Zack Steffen

=== Columbus Crew ===
- (Palestine) Wessam Abou Ali
- (Ivory Coast) Eric Bailly
- (Guinea) Sekou Bangoura
- (Algeria) Mohamed Farsi
- (Portugal) André Gomes
- (Guatemala) Nicholas Hagen
- (Cape Verde) Steven Moreira
- (Philippines) Cole Mrowka
- (United States) Patrick Schulte
- (Morocco) Anass Zaroury
- (United States) Sean Zawadzki

=== D.C. United ===
- (Israel) Tai Baribo
- (United States) Alex Bono
- (United States) Sean Johnson
- (Romania) Louis Munteanu
- (El Salvador) Nathan Ordaz
- (Finland) Matti Peltola
- (Australia) Kye Rowles
- (United States) Brandon Servania

=== FC Dallas ===
- (Sweden) Herman Johansson
- (Ecuador) Anderson Julio
- (United States) Bernard Kamungo
- (United States) Shaq Moore
- (Colombia) Santiago Moreno
- (Croatia) Petar Musa
- (Jamaica) Nicholas Simmonds

=== Houston Dynamo ===
- (Poland) Mateusz Bogusz
- (South Africa) Lyle Foster
- (Mexico) Héctor Herrera
- (United States) Duane Holmes
- (United States) Duncan McGuire
- (Mali) Diadie Samassékou

=== Inter Miami CF ===
- (Mexico) Germán Berterame
- (Brazil) Casemiro
- (Argentina) Rodrigo De Paul
- (Jamaica) Ian Fray
- (Paraguay) Matías Galarza
- (Argentina) Lionel Messi
- (Spain) Sergio Reguilón
- (Venezuela) Telasco Segovia
- (Canada) Dayne St. Clair
- (Uruguay) Luis Suárez

=== LA Galaxy ===
- (Ghana) Joseph Paintsil
- (Germany) Marco Reus
- (Finland) Robert Taylor
- (Japan) Maya Yoshida

=== Los Angeles FC ===
- (Gabon) Denis Bouanga
- (United States) (New Zealand) Tyler Boyd
- (Ukraine) Yevhen Cheberko
- (Canada) Mathieu Choinière
- (United States) Mark Delgado
- (United States) Jeremy Ebobisse
- (France) Hugo Lloris
- (United States) Aaron Long
- (Scotland) Ryan Porteous
- (Canada) Jacob Shaffelburg
- (South Korea) Son Heung-min
- (United States) Timothy Tillman

=== Minnesota United FC ===
- (New Zealand) Michael Boxall
- (United States) Kyle Duncan
- (United States) Julian Gressel
- (Panama) Carlos Harvey
- (South Africa) Bongokuhle Hlongwane
- (United States) Aziel Jackson
- (United States) Wil Trapp
- (Greece) Nectarios Triantis

=== CF Montreal ===
- (Venezuela) Wikelman Carmona
- (Guatemala) Olger Escobar
- (Canada) Victor Loturi
- (Bolivia) Efrain Morales
- (United States) Jalen Neal
- (Ghana) Prince Owusu
- (Venezuela) Daniel Pereira
- (Canada) Samuel Piette
- (Chile) Alexis Sánchez
- (Trinidad and Tobago) Dante Sealy
- (Ukraine) Hennadiy Synchuk
- (Colombia) Brayan Vera

=== Nashville SC ===
- (Honduras) Bryan Acosta
- (United States) Daniel Lovitz
- (Costa Rica) Warren Madrigal
- (Honduras) Andy Najar
- (Iraq) Ahmed Qasem
- (Tunisia) Elias Saad
- (Dominican Republic) Xavier Valdez
- (Australia) Patrick Yazbek

=== New England Revolution ===
- (Ecuador) Leonardo Campana
- (Israel) Ilay Feingold
- (Mali) Mamadou Fofana
- (Hungary) Dániel Gazdag
- (United States) Matt Polster
- (Israel) Dor Turgeman
- (United States) Matt Turner
- (United States) Jackson Yueill
- (Nigeria) Alhassan Yusuf

=== New York City FC ===
- (United States) Matt Freese
- (Jamaica) Tayvon Gray
- (Slovenia) Mitja Ilenič
- (Costa Rica) Alonso Martínez
- (United States) Matt Miazga
- (Argentina) Maxi Moralez
- (Australia) Aiden O'Neill
- (United States) Keaton Parks
- (United States) Andrés Perea
- (Trinidad and Tobago) Greg Ranjitsingh
- (El Salvador) Tomás Romero
- (United States) James Sands
- (Australia) Kai Trewin

=== New York Red Bulls ===
- (Cameroon) Eric Maxim Choupo-Moting
- (United States) Cade Cowell
- (Sweden) Emil Forsberg
- (United States) Ethan Horvath
- (Canada) Jahkeele Marshall-Rutty
- (Panama) Rafael Mosquera
- (United States) Tim Parker
- (Costa Rica) Andy Rojas
- (Honduras) David Ruiz
- (Mexico) Jorge Ruvalcaba
- (Panama) Omar Valencia

=== Orlando City SC ===
- (Colombia) Eduard Atuesta
- (Slovenia) David Brekalo
- (Peru) Wilder Cartagena
- (Canada) Maxime Crépeau
- (United States) Daryl Dike
- (France) Antoine Griezmann
- (Sweden) Robin Jansson
- (Paraguay) Braian Ojeda
- (Venezuela) Javier Otero
- (Croatia) Marco Pašalić
- (Trinidad and Tobago) Tyrese Spicer

=== Philadelphia Union ===
- (United States) Alejandro Bedoya
- (Jamaica) Andre Blake
- (Venezuela) Jesús Bueno
- (United States) Nathan Harriel
- (Haiti) Danley Jean Jacques
- (United States) Quinn Sullivan

=== Portland Timbers ===
- (United States) Cole Bassett
- (Colombia) Diego Chará
- (Venezuela) Ronald Hernández
- (Netherlands) Vincent Janssen
- (Costa Rica) Ariel Lassiter
- (Canada) Zac McGraw
- (Canada) Kamal Miller
- (Colombia) Juan David Mosquera
- (New Zealand) Finn Surman
- (Canada) Joel Waterman

=== Real Salt Lake ===
- (United States) Taylor Booth
- (Brazil) Rafael Cabral
- (Canada) Luc de Fougerolles
- (United States) Emeka Eneli
- (Guinea) Morgan Guilavogui
- (Georgia (country)) Saba Lobjanidze
- (United States) Diego Luna
- (Poland) Dominik Marczuk
- (Uruguay) Juan Manuel Sanabria
- (United States) DeAndre Yedlin

=== San Diego FC ===
- (Tunisia) Elias Achouri
- (Democratic Republic of the Congo) Cédric Bakambu
- (Cape Verde) CJ dos Santos
- (Denmark) Anders Dreyer
- (Panama) Aníbal Godoy
- (Denmark) Marcus Ingvartsen
- (Mexico) Hirving Lozano
- (Iceland) Dagur Dan Þórhallsson
- (Finland) Onni Valakari
- (United States) Sam Vines

=== San Jose Earthquakes ===
- (Burkina Faso) Ousseni Bouda
- (Mexico) Jonathan González
- (Scotland) Angus Gunn
- (Grenada) Darius Johnson
- (United States) DeJuan Jones
- (Guinea-Bissau) Ronaldo Vieira
- (Germany) Timo Werner

=== Seattle Sounders FC ===
- (United States) Paul Arriola
- (United States) Caden Clark
- (United States) Jesús Ferreira
- (Colombia) Yeimar Gómez Andrade
- (Serbia) Dejan Joveljić
- (South Korea) Kim Kee-hee
- (United States) Jordan Morris
- (Serbia) Nikola Petković
- (El Salvador) Alex Roldán
- (United States) Cristian Roldan
- (Slovakia) Albert Rusnák
- (Cameroon) Nouhou Tolo

=== Sporting Kansas City ===
- (Canada) Stephen Afrifa
- (Canada) Zorhan Bassong
- (Angola) Capita
- (Norway) Lasse Berg Johnsen

=== St. Louis City SC ===
- (Switzerland) Roman Bürki
- (United States) Damion Downs
- (Canada) Kyle Hiebert
- (South Korea) Jeong Sang-bin
- (Canada) Lukas MacNaughton

=== Toronto FC ===
- (Canada) Theo Corbeanu
- (Canada) Raheem Edwards
- (Haiti) Derrick Etienne
- (Canada) Richie Laryea
- (United States) Djordje Mihailovic
- (Scotland) Lewis Morgan
- (Canada) Jonathan Osorio
- (Colombia) Nelson Palacio
- (Hungary) Dániel Sallói
- (United States) Josh Sargent
- (United States) William Yarbrough
- (United States) Walker Zimmerman

=== Vancouver Whitecaps FC ===
- (Canada) Sam Adekugbe
- (United States) Tristan Blackmon
- (Peru) Kenji Cabrera
- (Paraguay) Andrés Cubas
- (Tunisia) Rayan Elloumi
- (Scotland) Ryan Gauld
- (Syria) Belal Halbouni
- (Angola) Rui Modesto
- (Germany) Thomas Müller
- (Senegal) Cheikh Sabaly
- (Serbia) Ranko Veselinović
- (United States) Brian White

== Listed by national team ==
=== Albania ===
- Enea Mihaj
- Myrto Uzuni

=== Algeria ===
- Mohamed Farsi

=== Angola ===
- Capita
- Rui Modesto

=== Argentina ===
- Rodrigo De Paul
- Lionel Messi
- Maxi Moralez

=== Australia ===
- Aiden O'Neill
- Kye Rowles
- Kai Trewin
- Patrick Yazbek

=== Austria ===
- David Schnegg

=== Benin ===
- Rodolfo Aloko

=== Bolivia ===
- Efrain Morales

=== Brazil ===
- Rafael Cabral
- Casemiro

=== Burkina Faso ===
- Ousseni Bouda
- Georgi Minoungou

=== Cameroon ===
- Eric Maxim Choupo-Moting
- Nouhou Tolo

=== Canada ===
- Sam Adekugbe
- Stephen Afrifa
- Zorhan Bassong
- Mathieu Choinière
- Theo Corbeanu
- Maxime Crépeau
- Luc de Fougerolles
- Raheem Edwards
- Kyle Hiebert
- Richie Laryea
- Victor Loturi
- Lukas MacNaughton
- Jahkeele Marshall-Rutty
- Zac McGraw
- Kamal Miller
- Jonathan Osorio
- Samuel Piette
- Jacob Shaffelburg
- Dayne St. Clair
- Joel Waterman

=== Cape Verde ===
- CJ dos Santos
- Steven Moreira

=== Chile ===
- Alexis Sánchez

=== Colombia ===
- Steven Alzate
- Eduard Atuesta
- Diego Chará
- Yeimar Gómez Andrade
- Santiago Moreno
- Juan David Mosquera
- Nelson Palacio
- Brayan Vera

=== DR Congo ===
- Cédric Bakambu

=== Costa Rica ===
- Ariel Lassiter
- Warren Madrigal
- Alonso Martínez
- Andy Rojas

=== Croatia ===
- Petar Musa
- Marco Pašalić

=== Czech Republic ===
- Pavel Bucha
- David Douděra

=== Denmark ===
- Anders Dreyer
- Marcus Ingvartsen

=== Dominican Republic ===
- Xavier Valdez

=== Ecuador ===
- Leonardo Campana
- Anderson Julio

=== El Salvador ===
- Nathan Ordaz
- Alex Roldán
- Tomás Romero

=== France ===
- Antoine Griezmann
- Hugo Lloris

=== Finland ===
- Robin Lod
- Matti Peltola
- Robert Taylor
- Onni Valakari

=== Gabon ===
- Denis Bouanga

=== Georgia ===
- Saba Lobjanidze
- Anzor Mekvabishvili

=== Germany ===
- Thomas Müller
- Marco Reus
- Timo Werner

=== Ghana ===
- Prince Owusu
- Joseph Paintsil

=== Greece ===
- Nectarios Triantis

=== Grenada ===
- Darius Johnson

=== Guatemala ===
- Olger Escobar
- Nicholas Hagen

=== Guinea ===
- Sekou Bangoura
- Morgan Guilavogui

=== Guinea-Bissau ===
- Ronaldo Vieira

=== Haiti ===
- Derrick Etienne
- Danley Jean Jacques
- Fafà Picault

=== Honduras ===
- Bryan Acosta
- Andy Najar
- Joseph Rosales
- David Ruiz

=== Hungary ===
- Dániel Gazdag
- Dániel Sallói

=== Iceland ===
- Dagur Dan Þórhallsson

=== Iraq ===
- Ahmed Qasem

=== Israel ===
- Liel Abada
- Tai Baribo
- Ilay Feingold
- Idan Toklomati
- Dor Turgeman

=== Ivory Coast ===
- Eric Bailly
- Jonathan Bamba

=== Jamaica ===
- Jon Bell
- Andre Blake
- Ian Fray
- Tayvon Gray
- Jayden Hibbert
- Alvas Powell
- Nicholas Simmonds

=== Japan ===
- Maya Yoshida

=== Mali ===
- Mamadou Fofana
- Diadie Samassékou

=== Mexico ===
- Germán Berterame
- Jonathan González
- Héctor Herrera
- Hirving Lozano
- Jorge Ruvalcaba

=== Morocco ===
- Anass Zaroury

=== Netherlands ===
- Vincent Janssen
- Tyrell Malacia

=== New Zealand ===
- Michael Boxall
- Tyler Boyd
- Finn Surman

=== Nigeria ===
- Alhassan Yusuf

=== Norway ===
- Lasse Berg Johnsen

=== Palestine ===
- Wessam Abou Ali

=== Panama ===
- Aníbal Godoy
- Carlos Harvey
- Rafael Mosquera
- Omar Valencia

=== Paraguay ===
- Miguel Almirón
- Júnior Alonso
- Andrés Cubas
- Matías Galarza
- Braian Ojeda

=== Peru ===
- Kenji Cabrera
- Wilder Cartagena

=== Philippines ===
- Cole Mrowka

=== Poland ===
- Mateusz Bogusz
- Robert Lewandowski
- Dominik Marczuk
- Przemysław Płacheta

=== Portugal ===
- André Gomes

=== Romania ===
- Louis Munteanu

=== Russia ===
- Aleksei Miranchuk

=== Saint Lucia ===
- Donavan Phillip

=== Scotland ===
- Ryan Gauld
- Angus Gunn
- Lewis Morgan
- Ryan Porteous

=== Senegal ===
- Cheikh Sabaly

=== Serbia ===
- Dejan Joveljić
- Nikola Petković
- Ranko Veselinović

=== Slovakia ===
- Albert Rusnák

=== Slovenia ===
- David Brekalo
- Mitja Ilenič

=== South Africa ===
- Lyle Foster
- Bongokuhle Hlongwane
- Mbekezeli Mbokazi

=== South Korea ===
- Jeong Sang-bin
- Kim Kee-hee
- Son Heung-min

=== Spain ===
- Sergio Reguilón

=== Sweden ===
- Emil Forsberg
- Robin Jansson
- Herman Johansson
- Anton Salétros

=== Switzerland ===
- Roman Bürki
- Breel Embolo

=== Syria ===
- Belal Halbouni

=== Togo ===
- Kévin Denkey

=== Trinidad and Tobago ===
- Jay Fortune
- Wayne Frederick
- Greg Ranjitsingh
- Dante Sealy
- Tyrese Spicer

=== Tunisia ===
- Elias Achouri
- Rayan Elloumi
- Elias Saad

=== Ukraine ===
- Yevhen Cheberko
- Oleksandr Svatok
- Hennadiy Synchuk

=== United States ===
- Paxten Aaronson
- Paul Arriola
- Josh Atencio
- Cole Bassett
- Alejandro Bedoya
- Alex Bono
- Taylor Booth
- Tyler Boyd
- Chris Brady
- Reggie Cannon
- Caden Clark
- Cade Cowell
- Luca de la Torre
- Mark Delgado
- Daryl Dike
- Damion Downs
- Kyle Duncan
- Jeremy Ebobisse
- Emeka Eneli
- Jesús Ferreira
- Matt Freese
- Julian Gressel
- Nathan Harriel
- Duane Holmes
- Ethan Horvath
- Aziel Jackson
- Sean Johnson
- DeJuan Jones
- Bernard Kamungo
- Henry Kessler
- Aaron Long
- Daniel Lovitz
- Diego Luna
- Duncan McGuire
- Matt Miazga
- Djordje Mihailovic
- Shaq Moore
- Jordan Morris
- Jalen Neal
- Tim Parker
- Keaton Parks
- Andrés Perea
- Fafà Picault
- Matt Polster
- Christian Ramirez
- Tim Ream
- Miles Robinson
- Sam Rogers
- Cristian Roldan
- James Sands
- Josh Sargent
- Patrick Schulte
- Brandon Servania
- Zack Steffen
- Quinn Sullivan
- Timothy Tillman
- Wil Trapp
- Matt Turner
- Brandon Vázquez
- Sam Vines
- Brian White
- William Yarbrough
- DeAndre Yedlin
- Jackson Yueill
- Sean Zawadzki
- Walker Zimmerman

=== Uruguay ===
- Juan Manuel Sanabria
- Luis Suárez
- Facundo Torres

=== Venezuela ===
- Jesús Bueno
- Wikelman Carmona
- Ender Echenique
- Ronald Hernández
- Miguel Navarro
- Javier Otero
- Daniel Pereira
- Telasco Segovia

=== Zimbabwe ===
- Teenage Hadebe

== Current MLS Players to play in a World Cup ==
=== 2006 FIFA World Cup ===
- (Argentina) Lionel Messi

=== 2010 FIFA World Cup ===
- (Argentina) Lionel Messi
- (Cameroon) Eric Maxim Choupo-Moting
- (Chile) Alexis Sánchez
- (France) Hugo Lloris
- (Germany) Thomas Müller
- (Uruguay) Luis Suárez

=== 2014 FIFA World Cup ===
- (Argentina) Lionel Messi
- (Cameroon) Eric Maxim Choupo-Moting
- (Chile) Alexis Sánchez
- (France) Antoine Griezmann
- (France) Hugo Lloris
- (Germany) Thomas Müller
- (Honduras) Andy Najar
- (Japan) Maya Yoshida
- (Mexico) Héctor Herrera
- (South Korea) Son Heung-min
- (Switzerland) Roman Bürki
- (United States) Alejandro Bedoya
- (United States) DeAndre Yedlin
- (Uruguay) Luis Suárez

=== 2018 FIFA World Cup ===
- (Argentina) Lionel Messi
- (Brazil) Casemiro
- (France) Antoine Griezmann
- (France) Hugo Lloris
- (Germany) Thomas Müller
- (Germany) Marco Reus
- (Germany) Timo Werner
- (Japan) Maya Yoshida
- (Mexico) Héctor Herrera
- (Mexico) Hirving Lozano
- (Panama) Aníbal Godoy
- (Peru) Wilder Cartagena
- (Poland) Robert Lewandowski
- (Russia) Aleksei Miranchuk
- (South Korea) Son Heung-min
- (Sweden) Emil Forsberg
- (Switzerland) Roman Bürki
- (Switzerland) Breel Embolo
- (Uruguay) Luis Suárez

=== 2022 FIFA World Cup ===
- (Argentina) Rodrigo De Paul
- (Argentina) Lionel Messi
- (Australia) Kye Rowles
- (Brazil) Casemiro
- (Cameroon) Eric Maxim Choupo-Moting
- (Cameroon) Nouhou Tolo
- (Canada) Sam Adekugbe
- (Canada) Richie Laryea
- (Canada) Kamal Miller
- (Canada) Jonathan Osorio
- (Canada) James Pantemis
- (Canada) Samuel Piette
- (Canada) Dayne St. Clair
- (Canada) Joel Waterman
- (France) Antoine Griezmann
- (France) Hugo Lloris
- (Germany) Thomas Müller
- (Japan) Maya Yoshida
- (Morocco) Anass Zaroury
- (Mexico) Héctor Herrera
- (Mexico) Hirving Lozano
- (Netherlands) Vincent Janssen
- (Netherlands) Tyrell Malacia
- (Poland) Robert Lewandowski
- (South Korea) Son Heung-min
- (Switzerland) Breel Embolo
- (United States) Luca de la Torre
- (United States) Jesús Ferreira
- (United States) Ethan Horvath
- (United States) Sean Johnson
- (United States) Aaron Long
- (United States) Shaq Moore
- (United States) Jordan Morris
- (United States) Tim Ream
- (United States) Cristian Roldan
- (United States) Josh Sargent
- (United States) Matt Turner
- (United States) DeAndre Yedlin
- (United States) Walker Zimmerman
- (Uruguay) Luis Suárez
- (Uruguay) Facundo Torres
