= Louicius Deedson =

Haitian footballer (born 2001)

Personal information
- Full name: Don Deedson Louicius
- Date of birth: 11 February 2001 (age 25)
- Place of birth: Tabarre, Haiti
- Height: 1.78 m (5 ft 10 in)
- Positions: Right winger; forward

Team information
- Current team: Sochaux
- Number: 11

Youth career
- Shana
- AS Truitier
- Ranch de la Croix-des-Bouquets
- 2016–2019: Kalonji Soccer Academy
- 2018: Atlanta United

Senior career*
Years	Team	Apps	(Gls)
2019–2023	Hobro	79	(19)
2023–2025	OB	56	(15)
2025–2026	FC Dallas	9	(1)
2026–	Sochaux	2	(0)

International career^{‡}
2021–	Haiti	39	(11)
- * Club domestic league appearances and goals as of 19 September 2026 ‡ National team caps and goals as of 4 October 2026

Don Deedson Louicius (born 11 February 2001), commonly known as Louicius Deedson, is a Haitian professional footballer who plays as a right winger for Ligue 2 club Sochaux and the Haiti national team.

== Early life ==
Deedson moved from Haiti to Atlanta at age 13, and later attended Centennial High School.

== Club career ==
On 18 July 2025, Deedson signed with FC Dallas. Deedson made his Dallas debut on 9 August 2025 against Portland Timbers. He scored his first goal for the club on 11 April 2026 against St. Louis City SC.

On 27 August 2026, Deedson was transferred to Ligue 2 side Sochaux.

== International career ==
He made his debut for Haiti national football team on 25 March 2021 in a World Cup qualifier against Belize.

On 12 September 2023, he scored his first two goals for Haiti in a CONCACAF Nations League match against Jamaica.

He represented Haiti at the 2025 CONCACAF Gold Cup, scoring in Haiti's match against the United States.

He represented Haiti at the 2026 FIFA World Cup.

== Career statistics ==
=== Club ===
As of match played 19 September 2026

Appearances and goals by club, season and competition
Club	Season	League			National Cup		Total	
Club	Season	Division	Apps	Goals	Apps	Goals	Apps	Goals
Hobro	2019–20	Danish Superliga	7	1	—		7	1
Hobro	2020–21	1. Division	18	2	—		18	2
Hobro	2021–22	1. Division	28	6	1	0	29	6
Hobro	2022–23	1. Division	26	10	2	1	28	11
Hobro	Total		79	19	3	1	82	20
OB	2023–24	Danish Superliga	27	8	1	0	28	8
OB	2025–26	Danish Superliga	29	7	0	0	29	7
OB	Total		56	15	1	0	57	15
FC Dallas	2025	MLS	2	0	0	0	2	0
FC Dallas	2026	MLS	7	1	0	0	7	1
FC Dallas	Total		9	1	0	0	9	1
Sochaux	2026–27	Ligue 1	2	0	0	0	2	0
Career Total			146	35	4	1	150	36

=== International ===
As of match played 4 October 2026

Appearances and goals by national team and year
National team	Year	Apps	Goals
Haiti	2021	4	0
Haiti	2023	3	2
Haiti	2024	9	4
Haiti	2025	12	4
Haiti	2026	11	1
Total		39	11

Scores and results list Haiti's goal tally first, score column indicates score after each Deedson goal.

List of international goals scored by Louicius Don Deedson
No.	Date	Venue	Opponent	Score	Result	Competition	Ref.
1	12 September 2023	Independence Park, Kingston, Jamaica	Jamaica	1–0	2–2	2023–24 CONCACAF Nations League A	
2	12 September 2023	Independence Park, Kingston, Jamaica	Jamaica	2–0	2–2	2023–24 CONCACAF Nations League A	
3	29 June 2024	Wildey Turf, Wildey, Barbados	Barbados	1–0	3–1	2026 FIFA World Cup qualification	
4	6 September 2024	Mayagüez Athletics Stadium, Mayagüez, Puerto Rico	Puerto Rico	3–1	4–1	2024–25 CONCACAF Nations League B	
5	14 October 2024	Trinidad Stadium, Oranjestad, Aruba	Aruba	3–2	5–3	2024–25 CONCACAF Nations League B	
6	18 November 2024	Mayagüez Athletics Stadium, Mayagüez, Puerto Rico	Puerto Rico	2–0	3–0	2024–25 CONCACAF Nations League B	
7	10 June 2025	Trinidad Stadium, Oranjestad, Aruba	Curaçao	1–3	1–5	2026 FIFA World Cup qualification	
8	22 June 2025	AT&T Stadium, Arlington, United States	United States	1–1	1–2	2025 CONCACAF Gold Cup	
9	9 October 2025	Nicaragua National Football Stadium, Managua, Nicaragua	Nicaragua	3–0	3–0	2026 FIFA World Cup qualification	
10	18 November 2025	Ergilio Hato Stadium, Willemstad, Curaçao	Nicaragua	1–0	2–0	2026 FIFA World Cup qualification	
11	1 October 2026	Estadio Olímpico Félix Sánchez, Santo Domingo, Puerto Rico	Dominican Republic	1–0	4–1	2026–27 CONCACAF Nations League A	

== Honours ==
OB

- Danish 1st Division: 2024–25
