= 2025 FC Dallas season =

FC Dallas
2025 season
- Owner: Clark and Dan Hunt
- Head coach: Eric Quill
- Stadium: Toyota Stadium
- MLS: Conference: 7th Overall: 16th
- MLS Cup playoffs: Round One
- U.S. Open Cup: Round of 16
- Top goalscorer: League: Petar Musa (19); All: Petar Musa (19)
- Highest home attendance: 11,151 (August 23 vs. Los Angeles FC)
- Lowest home attendance: 4,892 (May 7 vs. AV Alta FC) U.S. Open Cup
- Average home league attendance: 11,013
- Biggest win: 3–0 (July 19 vs. St. Louis City SC)
- Biggest defeat: 0–5 (May 4 vs. San Diego FC)
Primary colors	Alternate colors	Third colors

The 2025 FC Dallas season was the Major League Soccer club's 30th season and first under head coach Eric Quill after Peter Luccin took over as interim manager for the remainder of the previous year. The club participated in the 110th edition of the U.S. Open Cup. FC Dallas had revealed a logo on their official website commemorating their 30th season.

Due to renovations at Toyota Stadium, home match capacity was reduced to around 11,000.

== Transfers ==
=== In ===
No.	Pos.	Nat.	Name	Age	Moving from	Type	Transfer window	Ends	Transfer fee	Source
6	MF	(Ecuador)	Patrickson Delgado	21	Independiente del Valle (Ecuador)	Transfer	Pre-season		Signed to three-year contract (with an option for 2028) after spending the 2024 season on loan	
20	MF	(Brazil)	Pedrinho	21	North Texas SC (United States)	Transfer	Pre-season		One year contract with club options for the 2026 and 2027 seasons	
17	MF	(Brazil)	Ramiro	31	Cruzeiro (Brazil)	Transfer	Pre-season		Two-year contract with a one-year club option	
5	DF	(Ghana)	Lalas Abubakar	30	Colorado Rapids (United States)	Transfer	Pre-season		Two-year contract with a one-year club option	
11	FW	(Ecuador)	Anderson Julio	28	Real Salt Lake (United States)	Trade	Pre-season		Trade in exchange for defender Sam Junqua	
18	DF	(United States)	Shaq Moore	28	Nashville SC (United States)	Transfer	Pre-season		Two-year contract with a one-year club option	
7	MF	(Brazil)	Léo Chú	24	Seattle Sounders FC (United States)	Trade	Pre-season		Trade in exchange for forward Jesús Ferreira	
50	MF	(United States)	Diego García	18	North Texas SC (United States)	Transfer	Pre-season		Signed as a Homegrown Player	
51	MF	(Mexico)	Anthony Ramirez	19	North Texas SC (United States)	Transfer	Pre-season		Signed as a Homegrown Player	
30	GK	(United States)	Michael Collodi	23	North Texas SC (United States)	Transfer	Pre-season		Signed as a Homegrown Player	
35	DF	(Jamaica)	Malachi Molina	18	North Texas SC (United States)	Transfer	Pre-season		Signed as a Homegrown Player	
50	FW	(United States)	Diego Pepi	20	North Texas SC (United States)	Transfer	Pre-season		Signed as a Homegrown Player	
36	FW	(Poland)	Daniel Baran	18	North Texas SC (United States)	Transfer	Pre-season		Signed as a Homegrown Player	
29	DF	(United States)	Enzo Newman	19	Oregon State University (United States)	Transfer	Pre-season		Two-year contract with club options for 2027, 2028, and 2029	
3	DF	(England)	Osaze Urhoghide	24	Amiens SC (France)	Transfer	Pre-season		Four-year contract through 2028 with a one-year club option for 2029	
10	FW	(Argentina)	Luciano Acosta	30	FC Cincinnati (United States)	Trade	Pre-season		Acquired in a cash-for-player trade from FC Cincinnati in exchange for $5 million and up to $1 million in performance metrics incentives	
22	DF	(Brazil)	Álvaro Augusto	19	Portimonense S.C. (Portugal)	Transfer	Pre-season		Three-year contract through 2027 with club options for 2028 and 2029	
55	MF	(Brazil)	Kaick	18	Grêmio FBPA (Brazil)	Transfer	Mid-season		Signed a U22 Initiative four-year contract with a one-year club option	
7	FW	(Haiti)	Louicius Deedson	23	Odense Boldklub (Denmark)	Transfer	Mid-season		Signed through 2028 with options for 2029 and 2030	
24	DF	(United States)	Joshua Torquato	17	North Texas SC (United States)	Transfer	Mid-season		Signed to a Homegrown deal through 2027 with options for 2028 and 2029	
12	MF	(United States)	Christian Cappis	25	Viking FK (Norway)	Transfer	Mid-season		Signed through 2027 with options for 2028.	
28	FW	(United States)	Samuel Sarver	23	North Texas SC (United States)	Transfer	Mid-season		Signed from North Texas SC to a deal through 2026 with options for 2027 and 2028.	
98	GK	(United States)	Jacob Jackson	25	San Diego FC (United States)	Trade	Mid-season		Acquired from San Diego FC in exchange for the 2026 MLS SuperDraft natural third-round pick	

==== Draft picks ====
Round	Selection	Pos.	Name	College	Signed	Source
1	11	DF	(United States) Enzo Newman	Oregon State	Signed	
2	41	FW	(United States) Samuel Sarver	Indiana	Signed with North Texas SC	
3	71	DF	(Mali) Mohamed Cisset	Penn State	Signed with North Texas SC	

=== Out ===
No.	Pos.	Nat.	Name	Age	Moving to	Type	Transfer window	Transfer fee	Source
18	MF	(Canada)	Liam Fraser	26	Crawley Town (England)	Option Declined	Pre-season	Free	
3	DF	(United States)	Omar Gonzalez	36	Chicago Fire (United States)	Option Declined	Pre-season	Free	
11	FW	(United States)	Dante Sealy	21	CF Montreal (Canada)	Option Declined	Pre-season	Free	
22	DF	(Ghana)	Ema Twumasi	27	Piast Gliwice (Poland)	Option Declined	Pre-season	Free	
31	FW	(Ghana)	Eugene Ansah	30	F.C. Ashdod (Israel)	Option Declined	Pre-season	Free	
15	DF	(United States)	Isaiah Parker	22	n/a	Option Declined	Pre-season	Free	
24	DF	(Albania)	Amet Korça	24	NK Dubrava (Croatia)	Option Declined	Pre-season	Free	
36	MF	(Jamaica)	Malik Henry-Scott	23	Lexington SC (United States)	Option Declined	Pre-season	Free	
5	DF	(Brazil)	Ruan	29	Atlético Goianiense (Brazil)	Contract Expired	Pre-season	Free	
1	GK	(United States)	Jimmy Maurer	36	Houston Dynamo FC (United States)	Contract Expired	Pre-season	Free	
14	MF	(Spain)	Asier Illarramendi	34	Kitchee SC (China)	Contract Expired	Pre-season	Free	
29	DF	(United States)	Sam Junqua	28	Real Salt Lake (United States)	Trade	Pre-season	Traded in exchange for Ecuadorian International Anderson Julio, $200,000 in 2025 General Allocation Money and $200,000 in 2026 GAM	
10	FW	(United States)	Jesús Ferreira	24	Seattle Sounders FC (United States)	Trade	Pre-season	Traded in exchange for winger Léo Chú, $1 million in 2025 General Allocation; Money (GAM), $500k in 2026 GAM	
7	FW	(United States)	Paul Arriola	29	Seattle Sounders FC (United States)	Trade	Pre-season	Traded in exchange for up to $300,000 in General Allocation Money (GAM) and the Sounders’ 2026 first round MLS SuperDraft Pick	
17	DF	(United States)	Nkosi Tafari	27	Los Angeles FC (United States)	Trade	Pre-season	Traded in exchange for $300,000 in 2026 General Allocation Money (GAM) and a 2026 International Roster Slot	
20	FW	(Argentina)	Alan Velasco	22	Boca Juniors (Argentina)	Transfer	Pre-season	Undisclosed	
13	GK	(United States)	Antonio Carrera	21	Tigres UANL (Mexico)	Transfer	Mid-season	Undisclosed	
21	MF	(Angola)	Manuel Cafumana	26	Maccabi Haifa (Israel)	End of loan	Mid-season	Free	
7	MF	(Brazil)	Léo Chú	25	Alverca (Portugal)	Transfer	Mid-season	Undisclosed	
4	DF	(United States)	Marco Farfan	26	Tigres UANL (Mexico)	Transfer	Mid-season	Undisclosed	
10	MF	(Argentina)	Luciano Acosta	31	Fluminense (Brazil)	Transfer	Mid-season	Transferred to Fluminense for $4 million plus add-ons	

== Club ==
=== Roster ===
As of August 22, 2025

Note: Flags indicate national team as defined under FIFA eligibility rules; some limited exceptions apply. Players may hold more than one non-FIFA nationality.

No.	Pos.	Nation	Player
1	GK	IDN	Maarten Paes
2	DF	BRA	Geovane Jesus
3	DF	ENG	Osaze Urhoghide
5	DF	GHA	Lalas Abubakar
6	MF	ECU	Patrickson Delgado
7	FW	HAI	Louicius Deedson
8	MF	USA	Sebastian Lletget
9	FW	CRO	Petar Musa (DP)
11	FW	ECU	Anderson Julio
12	MF	USA	Christian Cappis
17	MF	BRA	Ramiro
18	DF	USA	Shaq Moore
19	MF	USA	Paxton Pomykal (HG)
20	FW	BRA	Pedrinho
22	DF	BRA	Álvaro Augusto
23	FW	USA	Logan Farrington

No.	Pos.	Nation	Player
24	DF	USA	Joshua Torquato (HG)
25	DF	USA	Sebastien Ibeagha
27	FW	USA	Herbert Endeley
28	FW	USA	Sam Sarver
29	DF	USA	Enzo Newman
30	GK	USA	Michael Collodi (HG)
32	DF	USA	Nolan Norris (HG)
34	MF	USA	Alejandro Urzua (HG)
35	DF	JAM	Malachi Molina (HG)
36	FW	POL	Daniel Baran (HG)
50	MF	USA	Diego García (HG)
51	MF	MEX	Anthony Ramirez (HG)
55	MF	BRA	Kaick
77	MF	USA	Bernard Kamungo
98	GK	USA	Jacob Jackson
99	MF	ROU	Enes Sali

=== Out on loan ===
Note: Flags indicate national team as defined under FIFA eligibility rules; some limited exceptions apply. Players may hold more than one non-FIFA nationality.

No.	Pos.	Nation	Player
—	MF	HAI	Carl Sainté (on loan to Phoenix Rising)
—	MF	USA	Tomas Pondeca (on loan to New Mexico United)
—	FW	USA	Diego Pepi (HG) (on loan to Texoma FC)
41	FW	JAM	Tarik Scott (HG) (on loan to Monterey Bay FC)
16	MF	RSA	Tsiki Ntsabeleng (on loan to Mamelodi Sundowns F.C.)

== Competitions ==
=== Preseason ===
January 26, 2025 International Friendly	FC Dinamo Tbilisi	0–2	FC Dallas	Algarve, Portugal
8:30AM CST (UTC-06)		Report	Musa 38'; Endeley 65'	Stadium: Pine Cliffs Resort

January 30, 2025 International Friendly	Brøndby IF	3–2	FC Dallas	Loulé, Portugal
7:00AM CST (UTC-06)	Kvistgaarden 19'; Suzuki 38'; Rajović 76'	Report	Brøndby IF 50' (o.g.); Farrington 79' (pen.)	Stadium: Estádio Algarve

February 7, 2025	FC Dallas	2–2	Houston Dynamo FC	Frisco, Texas
11:00AM CST (UTC-06)	Julio 34'; Ntsabeleng 114'	Report	Dueñas 46'; Sviatchenko 69'	Stadium: Toyota Stadium
Note: Played in four periods, one of 45-minutes and the remaining three of 30-minutes.

February 12, 2025	FC Dallas	4–3	FC Tulsa	Frisco, Texas
11:00AM CST (UTC-06)	Julio 10'; Musa 23'; Norris 45'; Farrington 65'	Report	Damm 12'; Calheira 45+7'; FC Tulsa 86'	Stadium: Toyota Stadium

February 15, 2025	Atlanta United FC	3–2	FC Dallas	Marietta, Georgia
11:00AM CST (UTC-06)	Lobzhanidze 12', 59'; Mosquera 129'	Report	Abubakar 64'; Kamungo 131'	Stadium: Children's Healthcare of Atlanta Training Center
Note: Match was split into three 45 minute halves.

=== MLS ===
==== Western Conference standings ====
Western Conference

MLS Western Conference table (2025)
Pos	Team	Pld	W	L	T	GF	GA	GD	Pts	Qualification
5	Seattle Sounders FC	34	15	9	10	58	48	+10	55	Qualification for round one
6	Austin FC	34	13	13	8	37	45	−8	47	Qualification for round one
7	FC Dallas	34	11	12	11	52	55	−3	44	Qualification for round one
8	Portland Timbers	34	11	12	11	41	48	−7	44	Qualification for the wild-card round
9	Real Salt Lake	34	12	17	5	38	49	−11	41	Qualification for the wild-card round

Source: MLS
Rules for classification: 1) points; 2) total wins; 3) total goal differential; 4) total goals scored; 5) fewer disciplinary points; 6) away goal differential; 7) away goals scored; 8) home goals differential; 9) home goals scored; 10) coin toss (2 clubs tied) or drawing of lots (≥3 clubs tied)

==== Overall standings ====
Overall MLS standings table (2025)
Pos	Team	Pld	W	L	T	GF	GA	GD	Pts
14	Orlando City SC	34	14	9	11	63	51	+12	53
15	Austin FC	34	13	13	8	37	45	−8	47
16	FC Dallas	34	11	12	11	52	55	−3	44
17	Portland Timbers	34	11	12	11	41	48	−7	44
18	New York Red Bulls	34	12	15	7	48	47	+1	43

Source: MLS
Rules for classification: 1) points; 2) total wins; 3) total goal differential; 4) total goals scored; 5) fewer disciplinary points; 6) away goal differential; 7) away goals scored; 8) home goals differential; 9) home goals scored; 10) coin toss (2 clubs tied) or drawing of lots (≥3 clubs tied)

==== Results summary ====
Overall								Home						Away					
Pld	W	D	L	GF	GA	GD	Pts	W	D	L	GF	GA	GD	W	D	L	GF	GA	GD
34	11	11	12	52	55	−3	44	6	3	8	25	25	0	5	8	4	27	30	−3

Last updated: October 18, 2025.
Source: Regular Season

==== Results by round ====
Round	1	2	3	4	5	6	7	8	9	10	11	12	13	14	15	16	17	18	19	20	21	22	23	24	25	26	27	28	29	30	31	32	33	34
Ground	A	A	H	H	A	H	A	H	A	A	A	H	H	A	A	H	A	H	H	H	A	A	H	H	H	A	H	A	H	H	A	H	A	A
Result	W	D	L	L	W	W	D	L	D	W	L	D	L	L	D	D	W	L	L	L	L	D	W	L	W	D	D	D	W	W	D	W	L	W

Updated to match(es) played on October 18, 2025. Source: Regular Season
A = Away; H = Home; W = Win; D = Draw; L = Loss; P = Postponed

==== Regular season ====
Kickoff times are in CDT (UTC-05) unless shown otherwise

February 22, 2025 1 Texas Derby	Houston Dynamo FC	1–2	FC Dallas	Houston, Texas
7:30PM CST (UTC-06)	Bassi 18'; Kowalczyk (yellow card) 32'	Report	Kamungo (yellow card) 25'; Musa 55'; Ibeagha (yellow card) 65'; Ramiro (yellow card) 67'; Julio 76'; Urhoghide (yellow card) 89'	Stadium: Shell Energy Stadium; Attendance: 18,623; Referee: Armando Villarreal

March 1, 2025 2	Colorado Rapids	3–3	FC Dallas	Commerce City, Colorado
8:30PM CST (UTC-06)	Rosenberry 6'; Navarro 39', 72'; Bassett (yellow card) 45+3'	Report	Pedrinho 43'; Acosta 45'; Musa 68'; Julio (yellow card) 76'	Stadium: Dick's Sporting Goods Park; Attendance: 15,410; Referee: Lorenzo Hernandez

March 8, 2025 3 Brimstone Cup	FC Dallas	1–3	Chicago Fire FC	Frisco, Texas
7:30PM CST (UTC-06)	Farrington 57'	Report	Pineda (yellow card) 45+1'; Gutiérrez (yellow card) 71'; Gutman 82'; Barroso 84'; Cuypers (yellow card) 88' (goal) 90+1' (pen.)	Stadium: Toyota Stadium; Attendance: 11,004; Referee: Sergii Demianchuk

March 15, 2025 4	FC Dallas	0–1	Vancouver Whitecaps FC	Frisco, Texas
7:30PM CDT (UTC-05)	Acosta (yellow card) 42'; Lletget (yellow card) 53'	Report	Blackmon (yellow card) 52' (goal) 54'; Nelson (yellow card) 68'	Stadium: Toyota Stadium; Attendance: 11,004; Referee: Jair Marrufo

March 22, 2025 5	Real Salt Lake	0–1	FC Dallas	Sandy, Utah
8:30PM CDT (UTC-05)	Piol (red card) 23'; Ruiz (yellow card) 25'; Ajago (yellow card) 68'; Vera (yellow card) 74'; Quinton (yellow card) 75'	Report	Musa (yellow card) 27'; Acosta 45+7', (yellow card) 90+6'; Farrington (yellow card) 74'; Ramiro (yellow card) 88'; Ibeagha (yellow card) 90+3'	Stadium: America First Field; Attendance: 19,650; Referee: Sergii Boiko

March 29, 2025 6	FC Dallas	2–1	Sporting Kansas City	Frisco, Texas
7:30PM CDT (UTC-05)	Moore (yellow card) 24'; Acosta 37'; Chú 39'; Ramiro (yellow card) 69'	Report	Bartlett (yellow card) 25'; Sallói 32'	Stadium: Toyota Stadium; Attendance: 11,004; Referee: Fotis Bazakos

April 5, 2025 7	Atlanta United FC	1–1	FC Dallas	Atlanta, Georgia
6:30PM CDT (UTC-05)	Almirón 17' (pen.); Latte Lath (yellow card) 84'	Report	Musa 60'	Stadium: Mercedes-Benz Stadium; Attendance: 41,984; Referee: Ricardo Fierro

April 12, 2025 8	FC Dallas	0–1	Seattle Sounders FC	Frisco, Texas
7:30PM CDT (UTC-05)	Kaick (yellow card) 8'; Norris (yellow card) 28'; Acosta (yellow card) 63'; Show (yellow card) 64'	Report	Musovski 17', (yellow card) 25'; Leyva (yellow card) 66'	Stadium: Toyota Stadium; Attendance: 11,004; Referee: Filip Dujic

April 19, 2025 9	Minnesota United FC	0–0	FC Dallas	Saint Paul, Minnesota
7:30PM CDT (UTC-05)	Trapp (yellow card) 41'; Romero (yellow card) 58'; Oluwaseyi (yellow card) 65'; Rosales (yellow card) 68'	Report	Ramiro (yellow card) 35'; Norris (yellow card) 87'	Stadium: Allianz Field; Attendance: 19,607; Referee: Abdou Ndiaye

April 27, 2025 10	Inter Miami CF	3–4	FC Dallas	Fort Lauderdale, Florida
4:00PM CDT (UTC-05)	Picault 16'; Obando 29'; Martínez 56'	Report	Moore 8'; Urhoghide 65'; Julio 69'; Pedrinho 81'; Acosta (yellow card) 83'	Stadium: Chase Stadium; Attendance: 20,727; Referee: Lukasz Szpala

May 3, 2025 11	San Diego FC	5–0	FC Dallas	San Diego, California
8:00PM CDT (UTC-05)	Lozano 20' (pen.), 27'; Tverskov (yellow card) 55'; Dreyer 56'; Valakari 73'; Iloski 87'	Report	Urhoghide (yellow card) 36'; Ramiro (yellow card) 76'	Stadium: Snapdragon Stadium; Attendance: 27,108; Referee: Joe Dickerson

May 10, 2025 12	FC Dallas	1–1	Real Salt Lake	Frisco, Texas
7:30PM CDT (UTC-05)	Show (yellow card) 5'; Julio 53'; Kaick (yellow card) 76'	Report	Glad (yellow card) 11'; Luna (yellow card) 15', (goal) 24'; Eneli (yellow card) 39'; Katranis (yellow card) 45+7'; Agada (yellow card) 51' (yellow-red card) 58'	Stadium: Toyota Stadium; Attendance: 11,004; Referee: Rosendo Mendoza

May 17, 2025 13 Texas Derby	FC Dallas	0–2	Houston Dynamo FC	Frisco, Texas
7:30PM CDT (UTC-05)	Acosta (yellow card) 84'; Pedrinho (yellow card) 88'; Urhoghide (yellow card) 90+3'	Report	Raines (yellow card) 44'; McGlynn 64'; Dorsey 81'; Escobar (yellow card) 84'	Stadium: Toyota Stadium; Attendance: 11,004; Referee: Tori Penso

May 24, 2025 14	Seattle Sounders FC	1–0	FC Dallas	Seattle, Washington
2:00PM CDT (UTC-05)	Rusnák 86' (pen.), (yellow card) 87'	Report	Ramiro (yellow card) 10'; Abubakar (yellow card) 44'; Musa (yellow card) 85'; Kaick (yellow card) 90+5'; Urhoghide (yellow card) 90+5'	Stadium: Lumen Field; Attendance: 30,575; Referee: Allen Chapman

May 28, 2025 15	FC Cincinnati	3–3	FC Dallas	Cincinnati, Ohio
6:30PM CDT (UTC-05)	Bucha 30'; Denkey 42' (pen.); Hadebe (yellow card) 78'; Valenzuela 86'; Baird (yellow card) 90+4'	Report	Farfan (yellow card) 8'; Kaick (yellow card) 44'; Musa 50', (yellow card) 62'; Julio 68'; Ibeagha 90+2'	Stadium: TQL Stadium; Attendance: 24,524; Referee: Marcos de Oliveira

May 31, 2025 16	FC Dallas	0–0	Philadelphia Union	Frisco, Texas
7:30PM CDT (UTC-05)	Abubakar (yellow card) 31' (yellow-red card) 39'; Kaick (yellow card) 75'; Ibeagha (yellow card) 90+1'	Report	Bender (yellow card) 90+3'	Stadium: Toyota Stadium; Attendance: 11,004; Referee: Sergii Boiko

June 14, 2025 17	Sporting Kansas City	2–4	FC Dallas	Kansas City, Kansas
7:30PM CDT (UTC-05)	Suleymanov 8'; Shelton (yellow card) 45+3' (red card) 62'; Muñóz 90+1'; Fernández (yellow card) 90+8'; Sallói (yellow card) 90+11'; Rodríguez (yellow card) 90+11'; García (yellow card) 90+11'	Report	Musa 11', (yellow card) 45+5'; Julio (yellow card) 45+7'; Pedrinho (yellow card) 49'; Acosta 59' (pen.), 82', (yellow card) 64'; Kamungo 69'	Stadium: Children's Mercy Park; Attendance: 17,144; Referee: Sergii Demianchuk

June 25, 2025 18	FC Dallas	2–4	San Jose Earthquakes	Frisco, Texas
7:30PM CDT (UTC-05)	Musa 30'; Moore 68'; Kaick (red card) 79'; Ibeagha (red card) 85'	Report	Munie (yellow card) 45+6'; Arango 50', (yellow card) 80'; Martínez 57'; Leroux 76'; Kaye (yellow card) 90+1', (goal) 90+9'	Stadium: Toyota Stadium; Attendance: 11,004; Referee: Timothy Ford
Note: 90-minute lightning delay

June 28, 2025 19	FC Dallas	2–3	San Diego FC	Frisco, Texas
7:30PM CDT (UTC-05)	Musa 44'; Lletget 56'; Moore (yellow card) 60'; Farrington (yellow card) 70'; Ntsabeleng (yellow card) 90+2'; Acosta (yellow card) 90+10'	Report	Dreyer 26' (pen.); Lozano 77'; Ángel 90+6'; Valakari (yellow card) 90+10'	Stadium: Toyota Stadium; Attendance: 11,004; Referee: Guido Gonzales Jr.

July 4, 2025 20	FC Dallas	1–2	Minnesota United FC	Frisco, Texas
7:30PM CDT (UTC-05)	Morre (yellow card) 47'; Farrington 73'	Report	Harvey 35'; Oluwaseyi (yellow card) 38'; Yeboah (yellow card) 45+2'; Markanich 58'	Stadium: Toyota Stadium; Attendance: 11,004; Referee: Jair Marrufo

July 12, 2025 21	Los Angeles FC	2–0	FC Dallas	Los Angeles, California
9:30PM CDT (UTC-05)	Ordaz 31'; Bouanga 45' (pen.)	Report	Musa (yellow card) 67'; Acosta (yellow card) 81'	Stadium: BMO Stadium; Attendance: 22,117; Referee: Allen Chapman

July 16, 2025 22	San Jose Earthquakes	2–2	FC Dallas	San Jose, California
9:30PM CDT (UTC-05)	Harkes 21', (yellow card) 68'; Costa (yellow card) 33'; Espinoza (yellow card) 45+8'; Wilson (yellow card) 80'; Daniel (yellow card) 85'; Martínez 86'	Report	Musa 45+3', 85'	Stadium: PayPal Park; Attendance: 15,304; Referee: Ramy Touchan

July 19, 2025 23	FC Dallas	3–0	St. Louis City SC	Frisco, Texas
7:30PM CDT (UTC-05)	Kaick 24'; Kamungo (yellow card) 59'; Farrington (yellow card) 77'; Musa 79', 88' (pen.)	Report		Stadium: Toyota Stadium; Attendance: 11,006; Referee: Marcos de Oliveira

July 25, 2025 24	FC Dallas	3–4	New York City FC	Frisco, Texas
7:30PM CDT (UTC-05)	Musa 15'; Farrington 17', 45+8'; Torquato (yellow card) 25'; Cappis (yellow card) 90+2'	Report	Shore 11'; Martínez 22', 46', 84'; Haak (yellow card) 31'; Perea (yellow card) 73'	Stadium: Toyota Stadium; Attendance: 11,004; Referee: Jon Freemon

August 9, 2025 25	FC Dallas	2–0	Portland Timbers	Frisco, Texas
7:30PM CDT (UTC-05)	Musa 8'; Delgado (yellow card) 29'; Abubakar 62'; Farrington (yellow card) 73'	Report	Paredes (yellow card) 24'	Stadium: Toyota Stadium; Attendance: 11,004; Referee: Malik Badawi

August 16, 2025 26 Copa Tejas	Austin FC	1–1	FC Dallas	Austin, Texas
7:30PM CDT (UTC-05)	Rubio (yellow card) 23'; Wolff 51'; Pereira (yellow card) 55'	Report	Cappis (yellow card) 23'; Moore 37'; Julio (yellow card) 79'; Kaick (yellow card) 90+7'	Stadium: Q2 Stadium; Attendance: 20,738; Referee: Armando Villarreal

August 23, 2025 27	FC Dallas	1–1	Los Angeles FC	Frisco, Texas
7:30PM CDT (UTC-05)	Farrington 13'; Ibeagha (yellow card) 39'; Ramiro (yellow card) 63'	Report	Son Heung-Min 6'; Tafari (yellow card) 67'; Hollingshead (yellow card) 75'; Bouanga (yellow card) 90+8'	Stadium: Toyota Stadium; Attendance: 11,151; Referee: Ricardo Fierro

September 6, 2025 28	St. Louis City SC	1–1	FC Dallas	St. Louis, Missouri
7:30PM CDT (UTC-05)	Pompeu 32'	Report	Collodi (red card) 16'; Musa 35'; Delgado (yellow card) 60'	Stadium: Energizer Park; Attendance: 22,423; Referee: Allen Chapman

September 13, 2025 29 Copa Tejas	FC Dallas	2–0	Austin FC	Frisco, Texas
7:30PM CDT (UTC-05)	Musa 2', (yellow card) 68'; Delgado (yellow card) 28'; Kamungo 49'; Kaick (yellow card) 72'; Ramiro (yellow card) 90'; Norris (yellow card) 90+7'	Report	Pereira (yellow card) 38'; Stuver (yellow card) 39'; Šabović (yellow card) 69'	Stadium: Toyota Stadium; Attendance: 11,004; Referee: Victor Rivas

September 20, 2025 30	FC Dallas	3–1	Colorado Rapids	Frisco, Texas
7:30PM CDT (UTC-05)	Musa 14'; Cappis 36'; Maxsø 80' (o.g.)	Report	Harris 21'; C. Bassett (yellow card) 31'; Yapi (yellow card) 90+5'	Stadium: Toyota Stadium; Attendance: 11,004; Referee: Drew Fischer

September 27, 2025 31	Portland Timbers	2–2	FC Dallas	Portland, Oregon
9:30PM CDT (UTC-05)	Mosquera (yellow card) 23'; Ramiro 45+2' (o.g.); Antony (yellow card) 63'; Surman (yellow card) 70'; Smith (yellow card) 78'; Paredes 81'	Report	Jackson (yellow card) 45+1'; Moore (yellow card) 57'; Musa 73' (pen.); Julio 85'	Stadium: Providence Park; Attendance: 24,611; Referee: Chris Penso

October 4, 2025 32	FC Dallas	2–1	LA Galaxy	Frisco, Texas
3:30PM CDT (UTC-05)	Musa 35'; Delgado 45+3'; Julio (yellow card) 90'	Report	Fagundez 4'; Cuevas (yellow card) 33'	Stadium: Toyota Stadium; Attendance: 11,004; Referee: Serhiy Boyko

October 11, 2025 33	LA Galaxy	2–1	FC Dallas	Carson, California
9:30PM CDT (UTC-05)	Wynder 42'; Pec (yellow card) 62', (goal) 87'; Cerrillo (yellow card) 82'; Parente (yellow card) 90+3'; Fagundez (yellow card) 90+4'	Report	Farrington (red card) 16'; Ramiro (yellow card) 21'; Julio 52'; Abubakar (yellow card) 61'; Musa (yellow card) 79'	Stadium: Dignity Health Sports Park; Attendance: 18,312; Referee: Jair Marrufo
Note: Match moved from August 30 due to LA Galaxy's participation in the 2025 Leagues Cup semifinal.

October 18, 2025 34	Vancouver Whitecaps FC	1–2	FC Dallas	Vancouver, British Columbia
8:00PM CDT (UTC-05)	Ocampo (yellow card) 2'; Laborda (red card) 11'; Müller 28' (pen.)	Report	Urhoghide 18', (yellow card) 89'; Abubakar (yellow card) 27'; Julio (yellow card) 45+1'; Kaick 47'; Kamungo (yellow card) 71'	Stadium: BC Place; Attendance: 26,741; Referee: Allen Chapman

=== MLS Cup Playoffs ===
==== Round one ====
October 26, 2025 Game 1	Vancouver Whitecaps FC	3–0	FC Dallas	Vancouver, British Columbia
6:30 PM CDT (UTC-05)	Ríos 43'; Müller 60' (pen.); Cabrera 83'; Johnson (yellow card) 90+4'	Report	Ramiro (yellow card) 73'; Sali (yellow card) 89'; Urhoghide (yellow card) 90+6'	Stadium: BC Place; Attendance: 32,066; Referee: Victor Rivas

November 1, 2025 Game 2	FC Dallas	1–1 (2–4 p)	Vancouver Whitecaps FC	Frisco, Texas
8:30 PM CDT (UTC-05)	Urhoghide (yellow card) 11'; Musa 25'; Cappis (yellow card) 32'; Ibeagha (yellow card) 36'; Kaick (yellow card) 90+2'	Report	Cubas (yellow card) 71'; Priso 90+3'	Stadium: Toyota Stadium; Attendance: 11,004; Referee: Tori Penso
	Penalties
	Musa (penalty scored); Delgado (penalty missed); Moore (penalty scored); Norris (penalty missed)		Müller (penalty scored); Berhalter (penalty scored); Cabrera (penalty scored); Halbouni (penalty scored)
Note: Vancouver Whitecaps FC won the series 2–0.

=== U.S. Open Cup ===
May 7, 2025 Round of 32	FC Dallas (Texas)	3–1	(California) AV Alta FC	Frisco, Texas
7:00PM CDT (UTC-05)	Acosta 3', (yellow card) 63'; Ntsabeleng (yellow card) 7'; Kaick 43'; Kamungo 71'; Ramiro (yellow card) 90+4'	Report	Lay 16'; Alassane (yellow card) 39'; Blancas (yellow card) 45'; Alaribe (yellow card) 53'; Villalobos (yellow card) 76'; Aoumaich (yellow card) 90+4'	Stadium: Toyota Stadium; Attendance: 4,892; Referee: Sergii Demianchuk

May 21, 2025 Round of 16	New York Red Bulls (New Jersey)	2–2 (a.e.t.) (4–3 p)	(Texas) FC Dallas	Harrison, New Jersey
6:30PM CDT (UTC-05)	Sofo 63'; Forsberg 90+3'	Report	Kamungo 28'; Acosta 78'; Ramiro (red card) 113'	Stadium: Sports Illustrated Stadium; Attendance: 3,749; Referee: Alyssa Nichols
	Penalties
	Choupo-Moting (penalty scored); Eile (penalty scored); Carmona (penalty missed); Edelman (penalty scored); Forsberg (penalty scored)		(penalty missed) Acosta; (penalty scored) Moore; (penalty scored) Farrington; (penalty scored) Farfan; (penalty missed) Pedrinho

=== Leagues Cup ===
FC Dallas did not qualify for the 2025 Leagues Cup as they were not one of the top 9 teams in the Western Conference for the 2024 season.

== Statistics ==
=== Appearances ===
Numbers outside parentheses denote appearances as starter.
Numbers in parentheses denote appearances as substitute.
Players with no appearances are not included in the list.

As of final match played November 1, 2025

No.	Pos.	Nat.	Name	MLS	U.S. Open Cup	Total
No.	Pos.	Nat.	Name	Apps	Apps	Apps
1	GK	IDN	Maarten Paes	22	1	23
3	DF	ENG	Osaze Urhoghide	27(2)	2	29(2)
5	DF	GHA	Lalas Abubakar	18(12)	2	20(12)
6	MF	ECU	Patrickson Delgado	22(9)	0	22(9)
7	MF	HAI	Louicius Deedson	(2)	0	(2)
8	MF	USA	Sebastian Lletget	14(7)	0	14(7)
9	FW	CRO	Petar Musa	29(3)	1	30(3)
11	FW	ECU	Anderson Julio	18(9)	1	19(9)
12	MF	USA	Christian Cappis	11(2)	0	11(2)
16	MF	RSA	Tsiki Ntsabeleng	1(12)	1	2(12)
17	MF	BRA	Ramiro	30(2)	2	32(2)
18	DF	USA	Shaq Moore	33(2)	2	35(2)
19	MF	USA	Paxton Pomykal	(4)	(1)	(5)
20	FW	BRA	Pedrinho	9(16)	(2)	9(18)
22	DF	BRA	Álvaro Augusto	4(3)	0	4(3)
23	FW	USA	Logan Farrington	19(15)	1(1)	20(16)
24	DF	USA	Joshua Torquato	3(3)	0	3(3)
25	DF	USA	Sebastien Ibeagha	32(3)	(1)	32(4)
28	FW	USA	Samuel Sarver	2(5)	0	2(5)
30	GK	USA	Michael Collodi	11	1	12
32	DF	USA	Nolan Norris	9(5)	2	11(5)
41	FW	JAM	Tarik Scott	(4)	(1)	(5)
50	MF	USA	Diego Garcia	(2)	(1)	(3)
51	MF	MEX	Anthony Ramirez	(1)	0	(1)
55	MF	BRA	Kaick	24(6)	2	26(6)
77	FW	USA	Bernard Kamungo	18(12)	2	20(12)
98	GK	USA	Jacob Jackson	3(1)	0	3(1)
99	FW	ROM	Enes Sali	(1)	0	(1)
Player(s) exiting club mid-season that made appearance
4	DF	USA	Marco Farfan	14(3)	(1)	14(4)
7	FW	BRA	Léo Chú	3(1)	0	3(1)
10	FW	ARG	Luciano Acosta	18(3)	2	20(3)
21	MF	ANG	Show	4(2)	(1)	4(3)

=== Goals and assists ===
As of final match played November 1, 2025
Player name(s) in italics transferred out mid-season.

No.	Pos.	Name	MLS		U.S. Open Cup		Total	
No.	Pos.	Name	Goals	Assists	Goals	Assists	Goals	Assists
3	DF	(England) Osaze Urhoghide	2	1	0	0	2	1
5	DF	(Ghana) Lalas Abubakar	1	0	0	0	1	0
6	MF	(Ecuador) Patrickson Delgado	1	6	0	0	1	6
7	MF	(Brazil) Léo Chú	1	0	0	0	1	0
8	MF	(United States) Sebastian Lletget	1	3	0	0	1	3
9	FW	(Croatia) Petar Musa	19	6	0	1	19	7
10	FW	(Argentina) Luciano Acosta	5	1	2	0	7	1
11	FW	(Ecuador) Anderson Julio	6	1	0	0	6	1
12	MF	(Ecuador) Christian Cappis	1	2	0	0	1	2
16	MF	(South Africa) Tsiki Ntsabeleng	0	0	0	1	0	1
17	MF	(Brazil) Ramiro	0	5	0	0	0	5
18	DF	(United States) Shaq Moore	3	4	0	1	3	5
20	FW	(Brazil) Pedrinho	2	2	0	0	2	2
21	MF	(Angola) Show	0	0	0	1	0	1
23	FW	(United States) Logan Farrington	5	4	0	0	5	4
25	DF	(United States) Sebastien Ibeagha	1	1	0	0	1	1
28	FW	(United States) Samuel Sarver	0	2	0	0	0	2
32	DF	(United States) Nolan Norris	0	1	0	0	0	1
55	MF	(Brazil) Kaick	2	0	1	0	3	0
77	MF	(United States) Bernard Kamungo	2	1	2	1	4	2
98	GK	(United States) Jacob Jackson	0	1	0	0	0	1
			1	0	0	0	1	0
Total			53	41	5	5	58	46

=== Disciplinary record ===
As of final match played November 1, 2025
Player name(s) in italics transferred out mid-season.

No.	Pos.	Name	MLS		U.S. Open Cup		Total	
No.	Pos.	Name	Booked	Sent off (straight red)	Booked	Sent off (straight red)	Booked	Sent off (straight red)
3	DF	(England) Osaze Urhoghide	7	0	0	0	7	0
4	DF	(United States) Marco Farfan	1	0	0	0	1	0
5	DF	(Ghana) Lalas Abubakar	4	1	0	0	4	1
6	MF	(Ecuador) Patrickson Delgado	3	0	0	0	3	0
8	MF	(United States) Sebastian Lletget	1	0	0	0	1	0
9	FW	(Croatia) Petar Musa	7	0	0	0	7	0
10	FW	(Argentina) Luciano Acosta	8	0	1	0	9	0
11	FW	(Ecuador) Anderson Julio	5	0	0	0	5	0
12	MF	(United States) Christian Cappis	3	0	0	0	3	0
16	MF	(South Africa) Tsiki Ntsabeleng	1	0	1	0	2	0
17	DF	(Brazil) Ramiro	10	0	1	1	11	1
18	DF	(United States) Shaq Moore	4	0	0	0	4	0
20	FW	(Brazil) Pedrinho	2	0	0	0	2	0
21	MF	(Angola) Show	2	0	0	0	2	0
23	FW	(United States) Logan Farrington	4	1	0	0	4	1
24	DF	(United States) Joshua Torquato	1	0	0	0	1	0
25	DF	(United States) Sebastien Ibeagha	5	1	0	0	5	1
30	GK	(United States) Michael Collodi	0	1	0	0	0	1
32	DF	(United States) Nolan Norris	3	0	0	0	3	0
55	MF	(Brazil) Kaick	8	1	0	0	8	1
77	FW	(United States) Bernard Kamungo	3	0	0	0	3	0
98	GK	(United States) Jacob Jackson	1	0	0	0	1	0
99	FW	(Romania) Enes Sali	1	0	0	0	1	0
Total			84	5	3	1	87	6

=== Goalkeeper stats ===
As of final match played November 1, 2025

No.	Name	Total				Major League Soccer				U.S. Open Cup			
No.	Name	MIN	GA	GAA	SV	MIN	GA	GAA	SV	MIN	GA	GAA	SV
1	(Indonesia) Maarten Paes	2100	45	1.96	69	1980	43	1.95	69	120	2	2	0
30	(United States) Michael Collodi	1006	13	1.08	40	916	12	1.09	37	90	1	1	3
98	(United States) Jacob Jackson	344	4	1	25	344	4	1	25	0	0	0	0
	TOTALS	3450	62	1.63	134	3240	59	1.64	131	210	3	1.5	3

== Kits ==
Primary	Alternate	Third

Type	Shirt	Shorts	Socks	First appearance / Info
Primary	Red / Dark Blue	Dark Blue / White stripes	Dark Blue / White Stripes	MLS, February 22, 2025 against Houston Dynamo FC
Alternate	Light Blue / Red Flames	Light Blue	Light Blue	MLS, March 1, 2025 against Colorado Rapids
Third	Black / Red and Wasabi Green Stripes	Black / Wasabi Green Stripes	Black / Wasabi Green Stripes	MLS, July 19, 2025 against St. Louis City SC
