= Petar Musa =

Croatian footballer (born 1998)

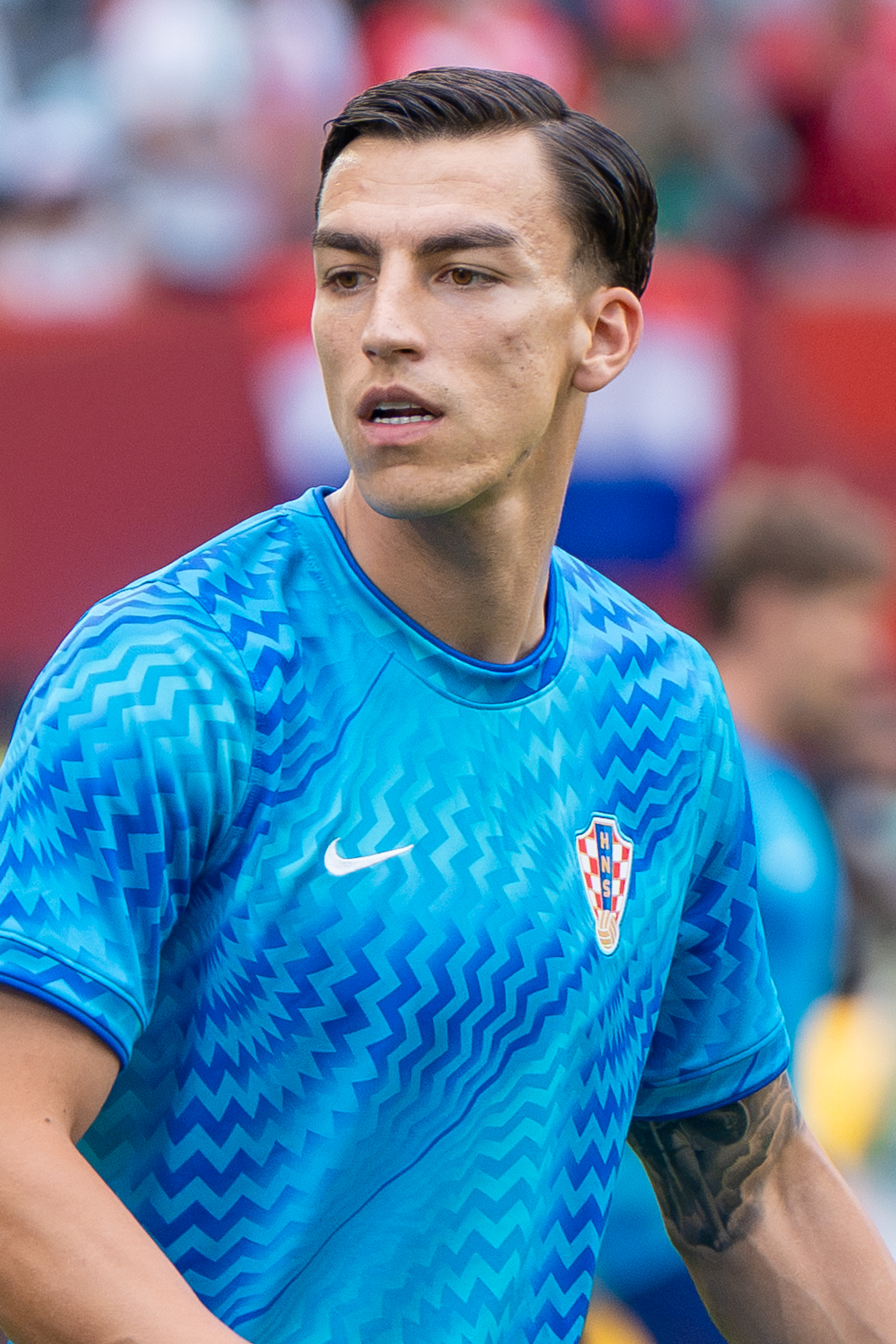
- Musa with Croatia in 2026

Personal information
- Date of birth: 4 March 1998 (age 28)
- Place of birth: Zagreb, Croatia
- Height: 1.90 m (6 ft 3 in)
- Position: Striker

Team information
- Current team: FC Dallas
- Number: 9

Youth career
- 2006–2007: Hrvatski Dragovoljac
- 2007–2015: NK Zagreb

Senior career*
Years	Team	Apps	(Gls)
2015–2017	NK Zagreb II	21	(16)
2015–2017	NK Zagreb	16	(0)
2017	Inter Zaprešić	0	(0)
2017–2022	Slavia Prague	30	(11)
2017–2018	→ Viktoria Žižkov (loan)	34	(11)
2019	→ Slovan Liberec (loan)	28	(7)
2021	→ Union Berlin (loan)	14	(1)
2021–2022	→ Boavista (loan)	27	(11)
2022–2024	Benfica	44	(12)
2024–	FC Dallas	90	(56)

International career^{‡}
2015	Croatia U18	3	(1)
2019–2021	Croatia U21	11	(4)
2023–	Croatia	14	(2)
Medal record
Men's football
Representing Croatia
UEFA Nations League
Runner-up	2023 Netherlands
- * Club domestic league appearances and goals as of 03:27, 8 November 2026 (UTC) ‡ National team caps and goals as of 18:30, 3 October 2026 (UTC)

Petar Musa (Croatian pronunciation: [pětar mûsa]; born 4 March 1998) is a Croatian professional footballer who plays as a striker for Major League Soccer club FC Dallas and the Croatia national team.

== Club career ==
=== Early career ===
Born in Zagreb, Musa started playing football in the Hrvatski Dragovoljac youth system, before joining NK Zagreb in 2007. He made his first team debut on 1 March 2016 in the Prva HNL in a 3–0 away loss to Slaven Belupo. Musa eventually made six appearances for his team, as they were relegated to the 2. HNL.

=== Slavia Prague ===
Musa was signed by Slavia Prague in 2017, but he was immediately loaned out to Viktoria Žižkov in the Czech National Football League. He scored 12 goals in 37 games on loan, but during the winter transfer window, he was loaned to Slovan Liberec in February 2019, making his debut in the Czech First League on 16 February in a 2–1 away loss against Baník Ostrava.

During the first half of 2019–20, Musa began displaying an impressive goalscoring form, scoring seven goals for his team, including a brace against Mladá Boleslav on 27 October, which led Slavia Prague to recall him from his loan and integrating him into the club's first team. In the league season, Musa scored Slavia's goal in the 1–1 draw to rivals Sparta Prague in the Prague derby, the winning goal in a 1–0 away victory over 1. FK Příbram, netted a brace in the 4–0 home victory over FK Jablonec. He finished the season as the league's top scorer alongside Libor Kozák, with 14 goals. In doing so, he became the youngest ever player (aged 22 years and 122 days) to achieve that feat.

Despite being scouted by a number of established European teams, Musa decided to stay in Prague for another season in order to continue his development. However, he fell into a scoring drought and was loaned for the remainder of the season to German Bundesliga side 1. FC Union Berlin on 1 February 2021, at the last day of the 2020–21 winter transfer window. The loan fee paid to Slavia Prague was reported as €200,000 by sports magazine Kicker. On 17 April, he scored his first Bundesliga goal in a 2–1 home victory over VfB Stuttgart, but he added no more goals in 14 games for the rest of the season.

Instead of returning to Slavia Prague, Musa was sent on a season-long loan to Portuguese Primeira Liga side Boavista on 25 August 2021, with an option to buy. He scored 12 goals and provided four assists, helping his side to a 12th-place finish, as Boavista triggered Musa's buyout clause of €3.5 million.

=== Benfica ===
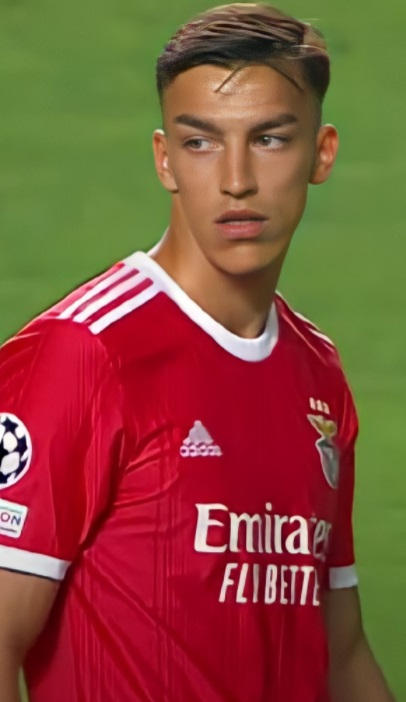
Musa with Benfica in 2022

On 20 May 2022, Musa signed a five-year contract with Benfica of the same league, for a fee of €5 million, plus half of Ricardo Mangas' economic rights and Ilija Vukotić being sent to Boavista in part-exchange for €500,000 of half of his economic rights bringing the net cost of the transaction to €4.5 million.

He made his debut for the club on 23 August, replacing Gonçalo Ramos in the 52nd minute in the 3–0 home win over Dynamo Kyiv in the second leg of the 2022–23 UEFA Champions League play-off round, helping his side qualify to the tournament. Four days later, Musa made his league debut, against his former side Boavista, providing an assist and managed to win a penalty for his side after being fouled inside the box, which was subsequently converted by João Mário in a 3–0 win. He scored his first goal on 8 October, closing a 4–2 home win over Rio Ave. On 15 October, Musa scored the opener in a 1–1 draw to Liga 3 side Caldas in the third round of the Taça de Portugal, which Benfica went on to win 6–4 in a penalty shoot-out, after extra-time. On 2 November, he scored his first UEFA Champions League goal in a 6–1 away win against Maccabi Haifa in their last 2022–23 UEFA Champions League group stage match, to ensure Benfica's qualification to the round of sixteen, as group winners. Over the course of the season, Musa remained a back up to first choice Gonçalo Ramos, as he only made substitute appearances, finishing the season with 11 goals in all competitions as he helped Benfica to win their first Primeira Liga title since 2019.

Musa started the 2023–24 season, on 9 August, closing the 2–0 victory over Porto in the Supertaça Cândido de Oliveira, winning his second trophy with Benfica.

=== FC Dallas ===
On 1 February 2024, Musa moved to Major League Soccer side FC Dallas, where he signed a four-year contract, with an option for a further year, as a Designated Player. The American club paid a club-record $9.7 million transfer fee, which could rise to $13 million with add-ons.

Musa made his debut for the club on 2 March against CF Montreal in the 2024 MLS season. During stoppage time at the half, Musa scored his first goal for FC Dallas after a VAR check, with an assist from Bernard Kamungo, in the 1–2 loss. On 19 June 2024, Musa recorded his first career hat trick in the 5–3 win against Minnesota United FC.

== International career ==
Musa began his international career with under-18 level in 2015, for a total of three caps. On 14 November 2019, Musa won his first cap for the under-21 side in a 3–1 victory in Lithuania for the 2021 European Championship qualification campaign. In March 2021, Musa took part in the 2021 UEFA European Under-21 Championship, helping Croatia to a quarter-final finish, after losing 2–1 to Spain in extra-time.

He was called up to the senior side by manager Zlatko Dalić on 16 May 2022, for the 2022–23 UEFA Nations League matches against Austria, France and Denmark. He made his senior international debut on 25 March 2023, replacing Marko Livaja in the 53rd minute of a 1–1 draw over Wales in the UEFA Euro 2024 qualifiers.

On 18 May 2026, Musa was selected in the 26-man squad for the 2026 FIFA World Cup. On 17 June, he scored his first World Cup goal in their group opener against England to tie the game 2–2 in an eventual 4–2 defeat.

== Personal life ==
His father Željko is a Bosnian Croat hailing from Široki Brijeg.

== Career statistics ==
=== Club ===
As of match played 21 November 2026

Appearances and goals by club, season and competition
Club	Season	League			National cup (Note: Includes Czech Cup, Taça de Portugal, U.S. Open Cup)		League cup (Note: Includes Taça da Liga)		Continental		Other		Total	
Club	Season	Division	Apps	Goals	Apps	Goals	Apps	Goals	Apps	Goals	Apps	Goals	Apps	Goals
Zagreb	2015–16	Prva HNL	6	0	—		—		—		—		6	0
Zagreb	2016–17	2. HNL	10	0	—		—		—		—		10	0
Zagreb	Total		16	0	—		—		—		—		16	0
Viktoria Žižkov (loan)	2017–18	Czech National League	20	5	1	1	—		—		—		21	6
Viktoria Žižkov (loan)	2018–19	Czech National League	14	6	2	0	—		—		—		16	6
Viktoria Žižkov (loan)	Total		34	11	3	1	—		—		—		37	12
Slovan Liberec (loan)	2018–19	Czech First League	10	0	1	0	—		—		—		11	0
Slovan Liberec (loan)	2019–20	Czech First League	17	7	3	1	—		—		—		20	8
Slovan Liberec (loan)	Total		27	7	4	1	—		—		—		31	8
Slavia Prague	2019–20	Czech First League	14	7	—		—		—		—		14	7
Slavia Prague	2020–21	Czech First League	14	4	1	0	—		6 (Note: Two appearances in UEFA Champions League, four appearances in UEFA Europa League)	0	—		21	4
Slavia Prague	2021–22	Czech First League	2	0	—		—		2 (Note: Appearances in UEFA Champions League)	0	—		4	0
Slavia Prague	Total		30	11	1	0	—		8	0	—		39	11
Union Berlin (loan)	2020–21	Bundesliga	14	1	—		—		—		—		14	1
Boavista (loan)	2021–22	Primeira Liga	27	11	1	0	3	1	—		—		31	12
Benfica	2022–23	Primeira Liga	30	7	2	1	3	1	6	2	—		41	11
Benfica	2023–24	Primeira Liga	14	5	3	0	1	0	6	0	1 (Note: Appearance in Supertaça Cândido de Oliveira)	1	25	6
Benfica	Total		44	12	5	1	4	1	12	2	1	1	66	17
FC Dallas	2024	MLS	30	16	2	1	—		—		2 (Note: Appearances in Leagues Cup)	0	34	17
FC Dallas	2025	MLS	30	18	1	0	—		—		2 (Note: Appearances in MLS Cup playoffs)	1	33	19
FC Dallas	2026	MLS	30	22	—		—		—		4 (Note: Three appearances and one goal in Leagues Cup, one appearance in MLS Cup playoffs)	1	34	23
FC Dallas	Total		90	56	3	1	—		—		8	2	101	59
Career total			283	109	17	4	7	2	20	2	9	3	335	120

=== International ===
As of match played 3 October 2026

Appearances and goals by national team and year
National team	Year	Apps	Goals
Croatia	2023	6	0
Croatia	2024	0	0
Croatia	2025	2	1
Croatia	2026	6	1
Total		14	2

Croatia score listed first, score column indicates score after each Musa goal.

List of international goals scored by Petar Musa
No.	Date	Venue	Opponent	Score	Result	Competition
1	14 November 2025	Stadion Rujevica, Rijeka, Croatia	Faroe Islands	2–1	3–1	2026 FIFA World Cup qualification
2	17 June 2026	AT&T Stadium, Arlington, United States	England	2–2	2–4	2026 FIFA World Cup

== Honours ==
Slavia Prague

- Czech First League: 2019–20, 2020–21
- Czech Cup: 2020–21

Benfica

- Primeira Liga: 2022–23
- Supertaça Cândido de Oliveira: 2023

Croatia

- UEFA Nations League runner-up: 2022–23

Individual

- MLS All-Star: 2024, 2026
- Czech First League Top Scorer: 2019–20
- Czech First League Forward of the Year: 2019–20
