= FC Shana =

Haitian football academy

- Full name: Football Club Shana
- Founded: 1999
- Manager: Edwige Vorbe
- Coach: Édouard Vorbe
- Website: http://fcshana.com/index.php/en/
Home colours	Away colours

FC Shana is a youth development association football academy in Haiti. It is one of the largest and most successful academies in the country.

== History ==
FC Shana was originally started by the family of Haitian footballer Fabien Vorbe when he was five years old him, his cousins, and friends, but officially founded sometime around 1999. It was started to offer all levels of development and competition in football from ages 6 to 16 and also receives them from all social backgrounds and sometimes different nationalities.

== Values ==
Shana stresses fair play.

== International competition ==
Shana usually plays annually in Santo Domingo, the capital of neighboring Dominican Republic.

In 2009, the U17 team won the Cayman Classic youth football tournament that consisted of U17 teams from Cayman Islands and Jamaica. The squad had just one seventeen-year-old.

In 2013, Shana participated in the Weston Cup & Showcase, an annual tournament in Florida, which had nearly 500 teams.

Shana participated in a competition at the West Orange Sports Complex from 22–25 January 2015. The U10 team won the tournament, while the U14 team finished third.

In 2016, Shana won the 2016 Weston Cup & Showcase in the Boys U17 Gold tournament during February 12–15.

Shana is one of the clubs to support the 2016 NYC Cup.
