= Joaquín Valiente =

Uruguayan footballer (born 2001)

Personal information
- Full name: Joaquín Valiente Cioli
- Date of birth: 13 April 2001 (age 25)
- Place of birth: Colonia Valdense, Uruguay
- Height: 1.65 m (5 ft 5 in)
- Positions: Midfielder; winger

Team information
- Current team: FC Dallas
- Number: 21

Youth career
- –2017: Club Atlético Colonia Valdense
- 2017–2020: Defensor Sporting

Senior career*
Years	Team	Apps	(Gls)
2020–2025	Defensor Sporting	105	(13)
2025	→ Barcelona SC (loan)	38	(5)
2026–	FC Dallas	32	(3)
- * Club domestic league appearances and goals as of 21 December 2025

Joaquín Valiente Cioli (born 13 April 2001) is a Uruguayan professional footballer who plays as a midfielder or winger for FC Dallas.

== Early life ==
Valiente was born on 13 April 2001. Born in Colonia Valdense, Uruguay, he is a native of the city.

== Career ==
As a youth player, Valiente joined the youth academy of Uruguayan side Club Atlético Colonia Valdense. Following his stint there, he joined the youth academy of Uruguayan side Defensor Sporting in 2017 and was promoted to the club's senior team in 2020, where he made 105 league appearances and scored 13 goals and helped them win the 2023 Copa Uruguay and the 2024 Copa Uruguay.

Ahead of the 2025 season, he was sent on loan to Ecuadorian side Barcelona SC, where he made thirty-eight league appearances and scored five goals. During February 2026, he signed for American side FC Dallas.
