= Ran Binyamin =

Israeli footballer (born 2004)

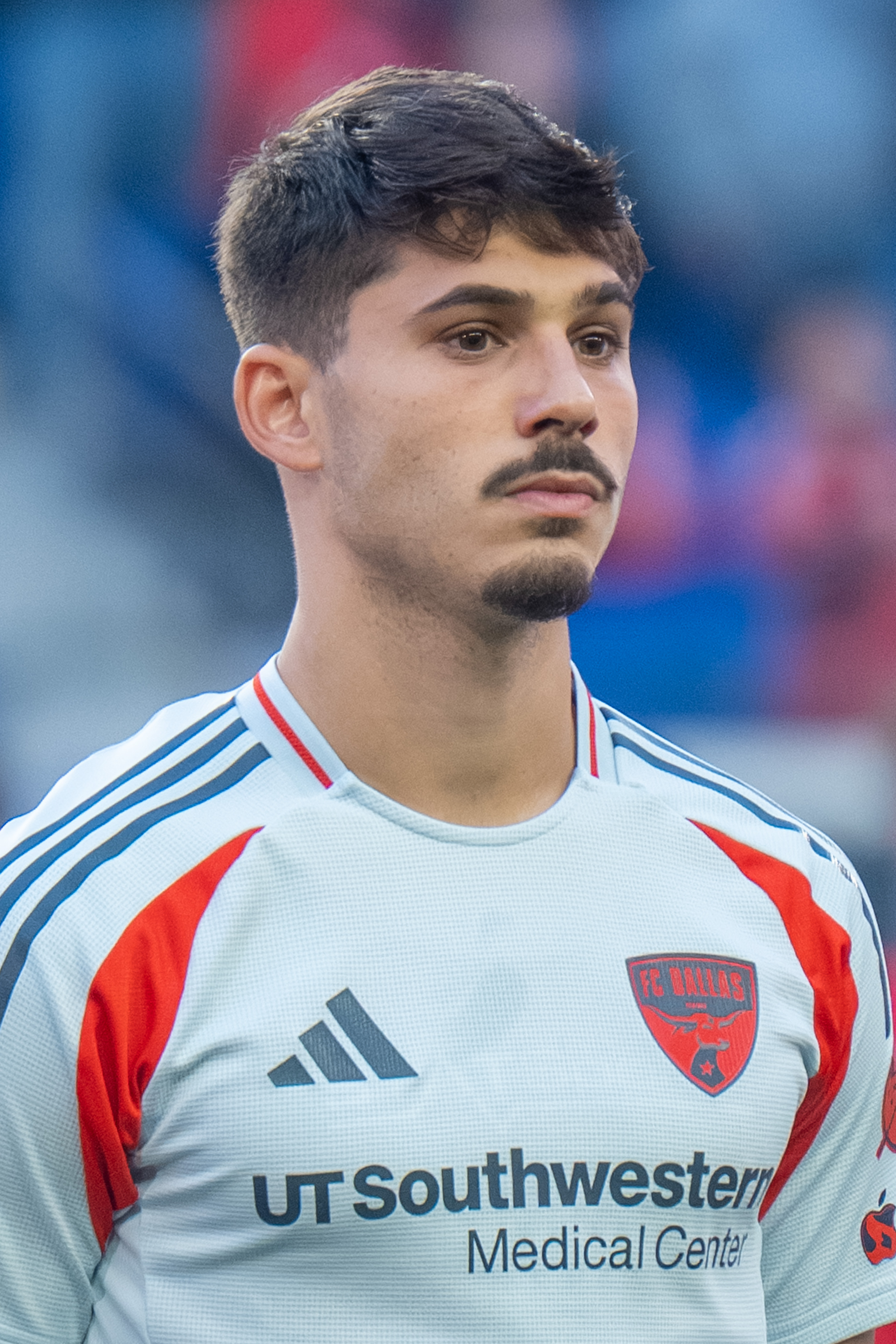
- Binyamin with FC Dallas in 2026

Personal information
- Full name: Ran Binyamin
- Date of birth: 6 February 2004 (age 22)
- Place of birth: Beer Sheva, Israel
- Height: 1.80 m (5 ft 11 in)
- Position: Midfielder

Team information
- Current team: FC Dallas
- Number: 6

Youth career
- 2015–2016: Hapoel Meitar
- 2016–2019: Hapoel Be'er Sheva
- 2019–2020: F.C. Ashdod
- 2020–2023: Hapoel Tel Aviv

Senior career*
Years	Team	Apps	(Gls)
2021–2025	Hapoel Tel Aviv	85	(9)
2026–	FC Dallas	0	(0)

International career^{‡}
2022–2023	Israel U19	11	(4)
2023	Israel U20	6	(1)
2023–2025	Israel U21	4	(1)
Medal record
Representing Israel U-19
UEFA European Under-19 Championship
Runner-up	2022 Slovakia	Team
Representing Israel U-20
FIFA U-20 World Cup
Third place	2023 Argentina	Team
- * Club domestic league appearances and goals as of 15 December 2025 ‡ National team caps and goals as of 4 June 2023

Ran Binyamin (Hebrew: רן בנימין; born 6 February 2004) is an Israeli professional footballer who plays as a midfielder for Major League Soccer club FC Dallas.

== Early life ==
Binyamin was born in the city of Beersheva, Israel, and raised in affluent neighbouring of Omer, to an Israeli family of Ashkenazi Jewish (Polish-Jewish) descent.

He also holds a Polish passport, on account his Ashkenazi Jewish (Polish-Jewish) ancestors, which eases the move to certain European football leagues.

== Club career ==
Binyamin began playing football in local clubs and after a year, he signed with Israeli club Hapoel Be'er Sheva. In 2019 he signed with F.C. Ashdod and one season later to Hapoel Tel Aviv.

On 30 July 2022 made his senior debut against Hapoel Jerusalem in the Toto Cup competition. On 8 August 2022 scored his debut goal in the 3–2 win against F.C. Ashdod.

== Career statistics ==
=== Club ===
As of 1 June 2024.

Club	Season	League			State Cup		Toto Cup		Continental		Other		Total	
Club	Season	Division	Apps	Goals	Apps	Goals	Apps	Goals	Apps	Goals	Apps	Goals	Apps	Goals
Hapoel Tel Aviv	2022–23	Israeli Premier League	13	0	0	0	4	1	–		0	0	17	1
Hapoel Tel Aviv	2023–24	Israeli Premier League	28	2	1	0	5	0	–		0	0	34	2
Hapoel Tel Aviv	2024–25	Liga Leumit	0	0	0	0	0	0	–		0	0	0	0
Career total			41	2	1	0	9	1	0	0	0	0	51	3

== See also ==
- List of Jewish footballers
- List of Jews in sports
- List of Israelis
