= Herman Johansson =

Swedish footballer (born 1997)

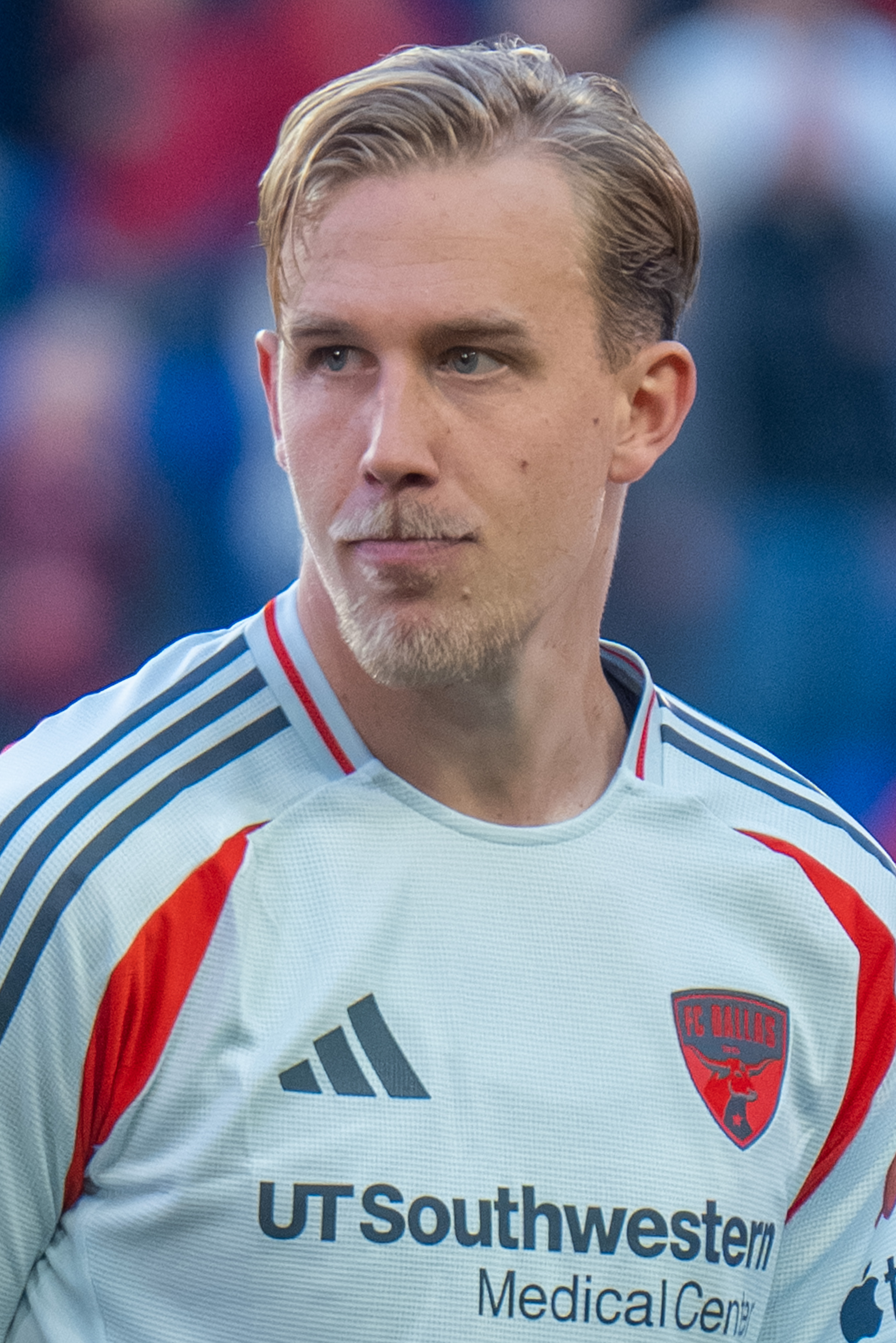
- Johansson with FC Dallas in 2026

Personal information
- Full name: Herman Nils Johansson
- Date of birth: 16 October 1997 (age 29)
- Place of birth: Örnsköldsvik, Sweden
- Height: 1.90 m (6 ft 3 in)
- Position: Right-back

Team information
- Current team: FC Dallas
- Number: 14

Youth career
- –2012: BK Örnen
- 2013: Friska Viljor FC

Senior career*
Years	Team	Apps	(Gls)
2014–2019	Friska Viljor FC	112	(53)
2020	Sandvikens IF	23	(9)
2021–2025	Mjällby AIF	117	(17)
2026–	FC Dallas	27	(0)

International career^{‡}
2025–	Sweden	3	(0)
- * Club domestic league appearances and goals as of 18:12, 21 October 2026 (UTC) ‡ National team caps and goals as of 13:02, 1 June 2026 (UTC)

Herman Nils Johansson (born 16 October 1997) is a Swedish professional footballer who plays as a defender for MLS club FC Dallas and the Sweden national team.

== Club career ==
Herman Johansson started his senior career in the main football club in his hometown of Örnsköldsvik, Friska Viljor FC, while also working as a pupil assistant in a local school. In December 2020, after a spell with Sandvikens IF, Johansson was recruited by Mjällby AIF, where he signed a three-year contract.

In December 2025, Johansson was presented as a new player for FC Dallas, signing a contract that extends through the 2028–29 season with an option for the 2029–30 season.

== International career ==
In November 2025, Johansson received his first call up for Sweden to a 2026 World Cup qualification fixture against Slovenia, following an injury from Emil Holm. He made his debut against Slovenia on 18 November 2025, replacing Mattias Svanberg in the 65th minute of a 1–1 draw.

On 30 May 2026, Johansson was called up for the 2026 FIFA World Cup, replacing injured Emil Holm.

== Career statistics ==
As of match played 1 June 2026

Appearances and goals by national team and year
National team	Year	Apps	Goals
Sweden	2025	1	0
Sweden	2026	2	0
Total		3	0

== Honours ==
Mjällby IF

- Allsvenskan: 2025
