= Bernard Kamungo =

American soccer player (born 2002)

Personal information
- Date of birth: January 1, 2002 (age 24)
- Place of birth: Kasulu, Tanzania
- Height: 5 ft 9 in (1.75 m)
- Position: Winger

Team information
- Current team: FC Dallas
- Number: 77

Youth career
- 2017–2021: Abilene High School

Senior career*
Years	Team	Apps	(Gls)
2021–2023	North Texas SC	52	(22)
2022–	FC Dallas	59	(7)

International career^{‡}
2023	United States U23	4	(0)
2024	United States	1	(0)
2026–	Tanzania	1	(0)
- * Club domestic league appearances and goals as of March 16, 2025 ‡ National team caps and goals as of November 21, 2026

Bernard Kamungo (born January 1, 2002) is a professional soccer player who plays as a winger for Major League Soccer club FC Dallas. Born a Congolese refugee in Tanzania, he has represented the United States national team once in 2024 before switching to the Tanzania national football team in 2026.

== Club career ==
Born in Kasulu, Kamungo and his family had lived in a refugee camp after his parents fled Democratic Republic of the Congo. In 2016, they were relocated to the United States and settled in Abilene, Texas. After moving to the United States, Kamungo was a member of the Abilene High School soccer team, the Abilene Eagles, and played under head coach Kyle Riese. Following his graduation from high school, Kamungo, alongside his brother Imani, began searching online for potential tryouts for Bernard. After seeing tryouts elsewhere with participation fees as high as $500, Imani found a tryout with North Texas SC, the reserve team for MLS side FC Dallas, for only a $90 fee. During that January 2021 trial, Kamungo impressed North Texas head coach Eric Quill and was signed to a professional contract on March 25.

On April 24, 2021, Kamungo made his debut against Fort Lauderdale CF, coming on as a 71st-minute substitute for Hope Avayevu. Eight minutes after coming onto the pitch, Kamungo scored his first professional goal as the match would end in a 4–2 victory.

On August 30, 2022, Kamungo signed a four-year contract with FC Dallas.

On April 15, 2023, he scored his first goal against Real Salt Lake in the 88th minute, which turned out to be the winning goal in a 2–1 FC Dallas victory.

On January 7, 2025, Kamungo signed a three-year contract with FC Dallas, with club options for 2028 and 2029.

== International career ==
Kamungo received his first call-up to the Tanzania national team in June 2023 for a 2023 Africa Cup of Nations qualification match against Niger.

On October 8, 2023, Kamungo was called up to the United States under-23 national team ahead of friendlies against Mexico and Japan.

Kamungo made his debut for the senior United States national team on January 20, 2024, in a friendly against Slovenia.

Following his change of allegiance to Tanzania, Kamungo debuted in a 2027 AFCON qualifier against Nigeria on November 17, 2026.

== Career statistics ==
=== Club ===
As of match played July 26, 2026

Appearances and goals by club, season and competition
Club	Season	League			National cup (Note: Includes U.S. Open Cup)		League cup (Note: Includes MLS Cup Playoffs)		Continental		Other		Total	
Club	Season	Division	Apps	Goals	Apps	Goals	Apps	Goals	Apps	Goals	Apps	Goals	Apps	Goals
North Texas SC	2021	USL League One	23	6	—		—		—		—		23	6
North Texas SC	2022	MLS Next Pro	25	16	—		—		—		—		25	16
North Texas SC	2023	MLS Next Pro	4	0	—		—		—		—		4	0
Total			52	22	–		–		–		–		52	22
FC Dallas	2022	MLS	1	0	—		—		—		—		1	0
FC Dallas	2023	MLS	16	6	1	0	3	0	—		4 (Note: Appearances in Leagues Cup)	2	24	8
FC Dallas	2024	MLS	29	0	3	0	—		—		2	0	34	0
FC Dallas	2025	MLS	16	2	2	2	2	0	—		—		20	4
FC Dallas	2026	MLS	6	0	—		—		—		—		6	0
Total			68	8	6	2	5	0	0	0	6	2	85	12
Career total			120	30	6	2	5	0	0	0	6	2	137	34

=== International ===
As of match played January 20, 2024

Appearances and goals by national team and year
National team	Year	Apps	Goals
United States	2024	1	0
Total		1	0
