= Nicholas Simmonds =

Jamaican footballer (born 2006)

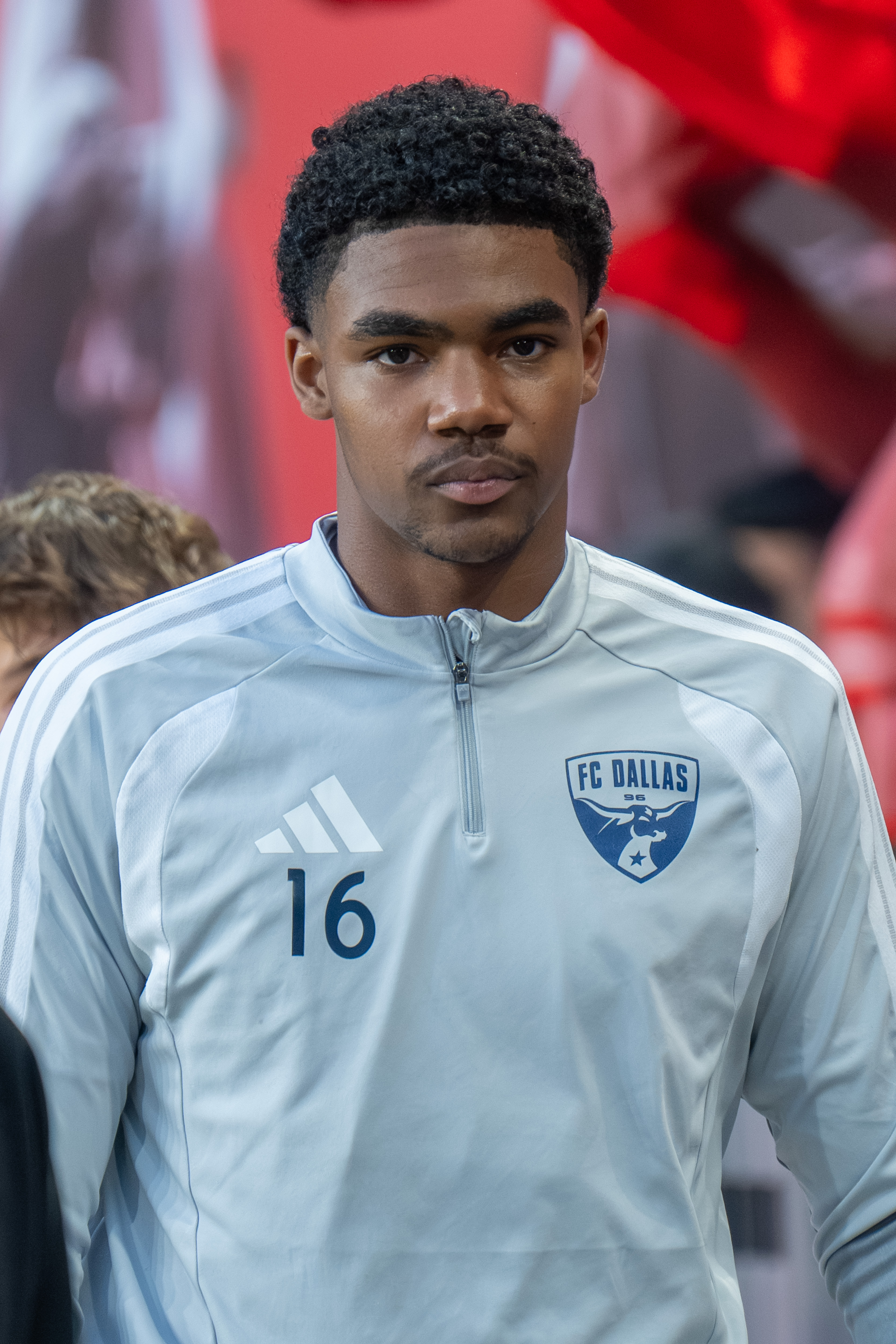
- Simmonds in 2026

Personal information
- Full name: Nicholas Gregory Simmonds
- Date of birth: 17 December 2006 (age 19)
- Place of birth: Midlothian, Virginia, United States
- Height: 1.91 m (6 ft 3 in)
- Position: Centre-forward

Team information
- Current team: FC Dallas
- Number: 16

Youth career
- 2019–2023: Richmond United

College career
Years	Team	Apps	(Gls)
2025	Virginia Cavaliers	19	(10)

Senior career*
Years	Team	Apps	(Gls)
2023–2025	Richmond Kickers	12	(1)
2025–	North Texas SC	4	(1)
2025–	FC Dallas	4	(0)

International career^{‡}
2023	Jamaica U17	1	(0)
2024	Jamaica U20	3	(1)
2026–	Jamaica	1	(0)
- * Club domestic league appearances and goals as of 21:56, 31 May 2026 (UTC) ‡ National team caps and goals as of 21:56, 31 May 2026 (UTC)

Nicholas Gregory Simmonds (born 17 December 2006) is a professional footballer who plays as a centre-forward for FC Dallas in Major League Soccer. Born in the United States, he plays for the Jamaica national team.

== Club career ==
Simmonds is a product of the academy of Richmond United from 2019 to 2023. In 2023, he joined the Richmond Kickers of USL League One, where he scored his first professional goal on his debut on 30 August 2023, becoming the youngest goalscorer in the club's history, making 14 appearances during his time there.

Simmonds subsequently enrolled at the University of Virginia, where he had an outstanding freshman season with the Virginia Cavaliers in the NCAA. He scored 10 goals and registered five assists, recording a hat-trick against Clemson—the first by a Virginia freshman since 2009—and earning ACC Freshman of the Year honours. He was the third Virginia freshman in school history to earn first-team All-American honours, joining Claudio Reyna (1991) and Tony Meola (1988).

On 17 December 2025, Simmonds signed a Generation Adidas contract and was selected 3rd overall by FC Dallas in the 2026 MLS SuperDraft, becoming the first Virginia player taken in the top three of the draft since Tony Tchani was picked second overall by New York Red Bulls in 2010. He was assigned to affiliate side North Texas SC and made his FC Dallas senior debut against the LA Galaxy on 18 April 2026.

== International career ==
Simmonds made his debut for the Jamaica U17s for the 2023 CONCACAF U-17 Championship. He subsequently represented the Jamaica U20 side, earning 3 caps and scoring 1 goal at that level. He was called up to the United States U20s in January 2026. In May 2026, he received his first senior call-up to the Jamaica squad for the 2026 Unity Cup Tournament.

== Personal life ==
Nicholas is the son of the former Jamaican footballer Greg Simmonds and brother of the Jamaican women's international Kameron Simmonds.
