= 2023 FC Dallas season =

FC Dallas
2023 season
- Owner: Clark and Dan Hunt
- Head coach: Nico Estévez
- Stadium: Toyota Stadium
- MLS: Conference: 7th Overall: 14th
- MLS Cup playoffs: Round one
- U.S. Open Cup: Round of 32
- Leagues Cup: Round of 16
- Top goalscorer: League: Jesús Ferreira (13); All: Jesús Ferreira (14)
- Highest home attendance: 19,906 (March 4 vs. LA Galaxy)
- Lowest home attendance: 6,149 (July 25 vs. Necaxa) Leagues Cup
- Average home league attendance: 18,287
- Biggest win: 4–1 (October 21 at LA Galaxy)
- Biggest defeat: 0–3 (June 21 vs. Austin FC)
Primary colors	Secondary colors

The 2023 FC Dallas season was the Major League Soccer club's 28th season and second under head coach Nico Estévez. FC Dallas also participated in the third edition of the Leagues Cup and the 108th edition of the U.S. Open Cup.

== Transfers ==
=== In ===
No.	Pos.	Nat.	Name	Age	Moving from	Type	Transfer window	Ends	Transfer fee	Source
41	FW	(United States)	Tarik Scott	17	FC Dallas Academy (United States)	Transfer	Pre-season		Three-year contract with club options for the 2026 and 2027 seasons	
32	DF	(United States)	Nolan Norris	17	FC Dallas Academy (United States)	Transfer	Pre-season		Three-year contract with club options for the 2026 and 2027 seasons	
21	FW	(Colombia)	José Mulato	19	Deportivo Cali (Colombia)	Transfer	Pre-season		Three-year contract with club options for the 2026 and 2027 seasons	
25	DF	(United States)	Sebastien Ibeagha	30	Los Angeles FC (United States)	Transfer	Pre-season		Two-year contract with club options for the 2025 and 2026 seasons	
2	DF	(Brazil)	Geovane Jesus	21	Cruzeiro (Brazil)	Transfer	Pre-season		Four-year contract with a club option for the 2027 season	
24	DF	(Albania)	Amet Korça	22	HNK Gorica (Croatia)	Transfer	Pre-season		One-year contract with club options for the 2024 and 2025 seasons	
28	FW	(United States)	Herbert Endeley	21	Indiana University (United States)	Signed Draft Pick	Pre-season		One-year contract with club options for the 2024, 2025 and 2026 season	
9	FW	(Spain)	Jesús Jiménez	29	Toronto FC (Canada)	Trade	Pre-season		Acquired in exchange for Brandon Servania and a 2023 international roster spot	
29	DF	(United States)	Sam Junqua	26	Houston Dynamo FC (United States)	Trade	Pre-season		Trade for Junqua’s “Right of First Refusal” in exchange for $75,000 of 2023 General Allocation Money	
44	DF	(Republic of Ireland)	Michael Webber	22	North Texas SC (United States)	Loan	Mid-season		On a Short-Term Loan Agreement from North Texas SC	
31	FW	(Ghana)	Eugene Ansah	28	Hapoel Be'er Sheva F.C. (Israel)	Transfer	Mid-season		One-and-a-half-year contract with a club option for the 2025 season	
14	MF	(Spain)	Asier Illarramendi	33	Real Sociedad (Spain)	Transfer	Mid-season		Signed for remainder of the 2023 season with an option for 2024	
18	MF	(Canada)	Liam Fraser	25	Deinze (Belgium)	Transfer	Mid-season		Signed for remainder of the 2023 season with an option in both 2024 and 2025	

==== Draft picks ====
Round	Selection	Pos.	Name	College	Signed	Source
1	24	FW	(United States) Herbert Endeley	Indiana University	Signed	
2	53	FW	(United States) Ryan Wittenbrink	Indiana University	Signed with Northern Colorado Hailstorm FC	
3	82	FW	(Jamaica) Kameron Lacey	UNC Charlotte	Unsigned	

=== Out ===
No.	Pos.	Nat.	Name	Age	Moving to	Type	Transfer window	Transfer fee	Source
26	DF	(United States)	Lucas Bartlett	25	St Louis City SC (United States)	Option Declined	Pre-season	Free	
2	DF	(United States)	Eddie Munjoma	24	Phoenix Rising FC (United States)	Option Declined	Pre-season	Free	
31	DF	(Guinea-Bissau)	Nanu	28	FC Porto (Portugal)	End of Loan	Pre-season	Free	
28	DF	(Ecuador)	Joshué Quiñónez	21	Barcelona S.C. (Ecuador)	End of Loan	Pre-season	Free	
80	MF	(United States)	Nicky Hernandez	24	New Mexico United (United States)	Option Declined	Pre-season	Free	
23	MF	(United States)	Thomas Roberts	21	Columbus Crew 2 (United States)	Option Declined	Pre-season	Free	
21	FW	(United States)	Kalil ElMedkhar	23	Loudoun United FC (United States)	Option Declined	Pre-season	Free	
14	FW	(Bosnia and Herzegovina)	Beni Redžić	20	none	Option Declined	Pre-season	Free	
28	DF	(United States)	Matt Hedges	32	Toronto FC (Canada)	Option Declined	Pre-season	Free	
29	FW	(Argentina)	Franco Jara	34	Club Atlético Belgrano (Argentina)	Contract Terminated	Pre-season	Club and player mutually agree to terminate contract	
18	MF	(United States)	Brandon Servania	23	Toronto FC (Canada)	Trade	Pre-season	Traded in exchange for Jesús Jiménez	
46	DF	(United States)	Justin Che	19	Brøndby IF (Denmark)	Transfer	Mid-season	Transfer agreement with Brøndby IF for defender Justin Che	
6	MF	(United States)	Edwin Cerrillo	22	LA Galaxy (United States)	Trade	Mid-season	Traded in exchange for up to $600,000 in General Allocation Money (GAM)	

== Club ==
=== Roster ===
As of August 5, 2023. Note: Flags indicate national team as defined under FIFA eligibility rules; some limited exceptions apply. Players may hold more than one non-FIFA nationality.

No.	Pos.	Nation	Player
1	GK	USA	Jimmy Maurer
2	DF	BRA	Geovane Jesus
3	DF	ESP	José Martínez
4	DF	USA	Marco Farfan
5	MF	ARG	Facundo Quignón
7	FW	USA	Paul Arriola (DP)
8	FW	COL	Jáder Obrian
9	FW	ESP	Jesús Jiménez
10	FW	USA	Jesús Ferreira (HG, DP)
11	FW	USA	Dante Sealy (HG)
12	MF	USA	Sebastian Lletget
13	GK	USA	Antonio Carrera (HG)
14	MF	ESP	Asier Illarramendi
16	FW	RSA	Tsiki Ntsabeleng
17	DF	USA	Nkosi Tafari

No.	Pos.	Nation	Player
18	MF	CAN	Liam Fraser
19	MF	USA	Paxton Pomykal (HG)
20	FW	ARG	Alan Velasco (DP)
21	FW	COL	José Mulato
22	DF	GHA	Ema Twumasi (GA)
23	DF	USA	Collin Smith (HG)
24	DF	ALB	Amet Korça
25	DF	USA	Sebastien Ibeagha
27	FW	USA	Herbert Endeley
29	DF	USA	Sam Junqua
30	GK	NED	Maarten Paes
31	FW	GHA	Eugene Ansah
32	DF	USA	Nolan Norris (HG)
41	FW	USA	Tarik Scott (HG)
77	FW	TAN	Bernard Kamungo

=== Out on loan ===
Note: Flags indicate national team as defined under FIFA eligibility rules; some limited exceptions apply. Players may hold more than one non-FIFA nationality.

No.	Pos.	Nation	Player
15	DF	USA	Isaiah Parker (GA) (on loan to San Antonio FC)

== Competitions ==
=== Preseason ===
January 25, 2023 International Friendly	FC Dallas	0–1	Barcelona S.C.	Frisco, Texas
7:00PM CST (UTC-06)	Ibeagha (yellow card) 13'; Parker (yellow card) 35'; Twumasi (yellow card) 79'	Report	Leonai (yellow card) 45'; Agustín Rodríguez 75'	Stadium: Toyota Stadium; Referee: Lorenzo Hernandez

February 3, 2023 International Friendly	Malmö FF	0–0	FC Dallas	Marbella, Spain
9:00AM CST (UTC-06)		Report		Stadium: Marbella Football Center

February 6, 2023 International Friendly	FC Dallas	1–1	Jeonbuk Hyundai Motors	Marbella, Spain
8:00AM CST (UTC-06)	Obrian 50'	Report	Song Min-kyu 27'	Stadium: Banús Football Center

February 9, 2023 International Friendly	FC Dallas	1–0	Hammarby Fotboll	Marbella, Spain
5:30AM CST (UTC-06)	Arriola 61'	Report		Stadium: Marbella Football Center

February 18, 2023	Houston Dynamo FC	2–0	FC Dallas	Houston, Texas
7:30PM CST (UTC-06)	Carrasquilla 31'; Baird 67' (pen.)	Report		Stadium: Shell Energy Stadium

=== MLS ===
==== Western Conference standings ====
Western Conference

MLS Western Conference table (2023)
Pos	Team	Pld	W	L	T	GF	GA	GD	Pts	Qualification
5	Real Salt Lake	34	14	12	8	48	50	−2	50	Qualification for round one
6	Vancouver Whitecaps FC	34	12	10	12	55	48	+7	48	Qualification for round one
7	FC Dallas	34	11	10	13	41	37	+4	46	Qualification for round one
8	Sporting Kansas City	34	12	14	8	48	51	−3	44	Qualification for the wild-card round
9	San Jose Earthquakes	34	10	10	14	39	43	−4	44	Qualification for the wild-card round

Source: MLS
Rules for classification: 1) points; 2) total wins; 3) total goal differential; 4) total goals scored; 5) fewer disciplinary points; 6) away goal differential; 7) away goals scored; 8) home goals differential; 9) home goals scored; 10) coin toss (2 clubs tied) or drawing of lots (≥3 clubs tied)

==== Overall standings ====
Overall MLS standings table
Pos	Team	Pld	W	L	T	GF	GA	GD	Pts	Qualification
12	Nashville SC	34	13	11	10	39	32	+7	49	Qualification for the CONCACAF Champions Cup Round One (Note: As 2023 Leagues Cup runner-up)
13	Vancouver Whitecaps FC (V)	34	12	10	12	55	48	+7	48	Qualification for the CONCACAF Champions Cup Round One (Note: As 2023 Canadian Championship winners)
14	FC Dallas	34	11	10	13	41	37	+4	46	Qualification for the U.S. Open Cup Round of 32 (Note: As one of the top seven teams in the overall table to not qualify for the 2024 CONCACAF Champions Cup)
15	Sporting Kansas City	34	12	14	8	48	51	−3	44	Qualification for the U.S. Open Cup Round of 32
16	San Jose Earthquakes	34	10	10	14	39	43	−4	44	Qualification for the U.S. Open Cup Round of 32

Source: MLS
Rules for classification: 1) points; 2) total wins; 3) total goal differential; 4) total goals scored; 5) fewer disciplinary points; 6) away goal differential; 7) away goals scored; 8) home goals differential; 9) home goals scored; 10) coin toss (2 clubs tied) or drawing of lots (≥3 clubs tied)
(V) Canadian Championship winner

==== Results summary ====
Overall								Home						Away					
Pld	W	D	L	GF	GA	GD	Pts	W	D	L	GF	GA	GD	W	D	L	GF	GA	GD
34	11	13	10	42	38	+4	46	7	7	3	23	16	+7	4	6	7	19	22	−3

Last updated: October 21, 2023.
Source: Regular Season

==== Results by round ====
Round	1	2	3	4	5	6	7	8	9	10	11	12	13	14	15	16	17	18	19	20	21	22	23	24	25	26	27	28	29	30	31	32	33	34
Ground	H	H	A	H	A	H	A	H	A	A	H	A	H	H	A	A	H	A	A	H	H	A	A	H	A	H	H	A	H	A	A	H	H	A
Result	L	W	D	W	L	D	W	W	L	D	W	W	W	D	D	L	L	L	L	W	L	L	D	W	L	D	D	W	D	D	D	D	D	W

Updated to match(es) played on October 21, 2023. Source: Regular Season
A = Away; H = Home; W = Win; D = Draw; L = Loss; P = Postponed

==== Regular season ====
Kickoff times are in CDT (UTC-05) unless shown otherwise

February 25, 2023 1	FC Dallas	0–1	Minnesota United FC	Frisco, Texas
7:30PM CST (UTC-06)	Farfan (yellow card) 62'	Report	Trapp (yellow card) 24'; García 48'; Tapias (yellow card) 50'	Stadium: Toyota Stadium; Attendance: 19,096; Referee: Ramy Touchan

March 4, 2023 2	FC Dallas	3–1	LA Galaxy	Frisco, Texas
8:30PM CST (UTC-06)	Velasco 45+2' (yellow card) 72'; Cerrillo (yellow card) 54'; Ferreira 56', 64'; Obrian (yellow card) 90+1'; Jesus (yellow card) 90+7'	Report	Joveljić 35'; Delgado (yellow card) 41'; Leerdam (yellow card) 58'; Judd (yellow card) 90+9'	Stadium: Toyota Stadium; Attendance: 19,906; Referee: Timothy Ford

March 11, 2023 3	Vancouver Whitecaps FC	1–1	FC Dallas	Vancouver, British Columbia
4:00PM CST (UTC-06)	Arriola 34' (o.g.); Cubas (yellow card) 42'; Schöpf (yellow card) 75'	Report	Ibeagha 5'; Tafari (yellow card) 69'; Obrian (yellow card) 88'	Stadium: BC Place; Attendance: 16,780; Referee: Marcos de Oliveira

March 18, 2023 4	FC Dallas	2–1	Sporting Kansas City	Frisco, Texas
7:30PM CDT (UTC-05)	Velasco 55'; Paes (yellow card) 62'; Twumasi (yellow card) 76'; Ferreira 84'	Report	Sallói 11'; Voloder (yellow card) 78'	Stadium: Toyota Stadium; Attendance: 17,467; Referee: Pierre-Luc Lauziere

March 25, 2023 5	Los Angeles FC	2–1	FC Dallas	Los Angeles, California
9:30PM CDT (UTC-05)	Tillman 3'; Murillo (yellow card) 38'; Hollingshead (yellow card) 69'; Bouanga 84'	Report	Twumasi (red card) 35'; Quignón (yellow card) 41'; Ibeagha (yellow card) 53'; Cerrillo (yellow card) 62'; Tafari (yellow card) 66' (goal) 73'	Stadium: BMO Stadium; Attendance: 22,163; Referee: Lukasz Szpala

April 1, 2023 6	FC Dallas	1–1	Portland Timbers	Frisco, Texas
7:30PM CDT (UTC-05)	Velasco (yellow card) 28'; Cerrillo (yellow card) 44'; Quignón 74'; Pomykal (yellow card) 81'; Tafari (yellow card) 90+5'	Report	Boli 90+2'	Stadium: Toyota Stadium; Attendance: 19,096; Referee: Armando Villarreal

April 8, 2023 7	Inter Miami CF	0–1	FC Dallas	Fort Lauderdale, Florida
6:30PM CDT (UTC-05)	Jean (yellow card) 90+5'	Report	Ferreira 27'; Pomykal (yellow card) 35'; Velasco (yellow card) 77'; Farfan (yellow card) 85'; Obrian (yellow card) 90+13'	Stadium: DRV PNK Stadium; Attendance: 17,287; Referee: Filip Dujic

April 15, 2023 8	FC Dallas	2–1	Real Salt Lake	Frisco, Texas
7:30PM CDT (UTC-05)	Ferreira 5' (yellow card) 90+4'; Jesus (yellow card) 69'; Kamungo 88'; Ntsabeleng (yellow card) 90+3'	Report	Rubin (yellow card) 49'; Savarino 68'; Vera (yellow card) 74'	Stadium: Toyota Stadium; Attendance: 19,096; Referee: Sergii Boiko

April 22, 2023 9	New York City FC	3–1	FC Dallas	New York, New York
6:30PM CDT (UTC-05)	Rodríguez 44', 50' (yellow card) 90'; Magno 55'	Report	Pomykal (yellow card) 51'; Obrian (yellow card) 66'; Arriola (yellow card) 71'; Martínez 77'	Stadium: Citi Field; Attendance: 20,922; Referee: Fotis Bazakos

April 30, 2023 10	Minnesota United FC	0–0	FC Dallas	Saint Paul, Minnesota
8:00PM CDT (UTC-05)	Jeong (yellow card) 31'; Fragapane (yellow card) 86'	Report	Martínez (yellow card) 45+1'	Stadium: Allianz Field; Attendance: 18,410; Referee: Allen Chapman

May 13, 2023 12 Copa Tejas	Austin FC	0–1	FC Dallas	Austin, Texas
7:30PM CDT (UTC-05)	Väisänen (yellow card) 41'; Redes (yellow card) 46' (yellow-red card) 54'; Valencia (yellow card) 63'	Report	Lletget (yellow card) 24'; Pomykal (yellow card) 42'; Ntsabeleng (yellow card) 83'; Ferreira 89' (yellow card) 90'	Stadium: Q2 Stadium; Attendance: 20,738; Referee: Ismail Elfath

May 17, 2023 13	FC Dallas	2–1	Vancouver Whitecaps FC	Frisco, Texas
7:30PM CDT (UTC-05)	Ferreira 37', 54'; Cerrillo (yellow card) 75'	Report	Vite 23'; Laborda (yellow card) 35'	Stadium: Toyota Stadium; Attendance: 15,890; Referee: Jon Freemon

May 20, 2023 14 Texas Derby	FC Dallas	1–1	Houston Dynamo FC	Frisco, Texas
7:30PM CDT (UTC-05)	Obrian 53'	Report	Gasper (yellow card) 25'; Úlfarsson 85'; Escobar (yellow card) 90+3'	Stadium: Toyota Stadium; Attendance: 19,096; Referee: Victor Rivas

May 27, 2023 15	San Jose Earthquakes	1–1	FC Dallas	San Jose, California
9:30PM CDT (UTC-05)	Yueill (yellow card) 25'; Marie (yellow card) 49'; Kikanović 70'; Judson (yellow card) 90' (yellow-red card) 90+10'; Gruezo (yellow card) 90+9'	Report	Farfan (yellow card) 69'; Velasco (yellow card) 90'; Tafari 90+4'	Stadium: PayPal Park; Attendance: 13,409; Referee: Filip Dujic

May 31, 2023 16	Sporting Kansas City	2–1	FC Dallas	Kansas City, Kansas
8:35PM CDT (UTC-05)	Ndenbe (yellow card) 37'; Kinda 41'; Sallói 60'	Report	Ferreira 90+1'; Cerrillo (yellow card) 90+3'	Stadium: Children's Mercy Park; Attendance: 17,178; Referee: Guido Gonzales Jr.
Note: Delayed start due to inclement weather

June 3, 2023 17	FC Dallas	1–2	Nashville SC	Frisco, Texas
7:30PM CDT (UTC-05)	Obrian 25'; Norris (yellow card) 43'	Report	Norris 9' (o.g.); Mukhtar 77'; Greguš (yellow card) 88'; Washington (yellow card) 90+6'	Stadium: Toyota Stadium; Attendance: 16,890; Referee: Pierre-Luc Lauziere

June 7, 2023 11	FC Dallas	2–0	St. Louis City SC	Frisco, Texas
7:30PM CDT (UTC-05)	Ferreira 80'; Farfan 89'	Report	Gioacchini (yellow card) 25'; Ostrák (yellow card) 45+3'; Parker (yellow card) 47'; Bartlett (yellow card) 67'	Stadium: Toyota Stadium; Attendance: 19,096; Referee: Drew Fischer
Note: Rescheduled Matchday 11 game originally suspended due to inclement weather on May 6. The matchup recommenced where left off in the 50th minute of play.

June 11, 2023 18	Portland Timbers	1–0	FC Dallas	Portland, Oregon
9:00PM CDT (UTC-05)	Evander (yellow card) 16'; Boli 35'; Chará (yellow card) 71'; Paredes (yellow card) 90+6'; Loría (yellow card) 90+8'	Report	Obrian (yellow card) 45'; Cerrillo (yellow card) 46'; Jesus (yellow card) 71'	Stadium: Providence Park; Attendance: 22,907; Referee: Ted Unkel

June 21, 2023 19 Copa Tejas	Austin FC	3–0	FC Dallas	Austin, Texas
7:30PM CDT (UTC-05)	Finlay 17'; Fagundez 42'; Zardes 58'	Report	Quignon (yellow card) 25'	Stadium: Q2 Stadium; Attendance: 20,738; Referee: Rosendo Mendoza

July 1, 2023 20	FC Dallas	2–0	Los Angeles FC	Frisco, Texas
7:30PM CDT (UTC-05)	Jesus (yellow card) 24'; Kamungo 56'; Junqua 90'; Mulato (yellow card) 90+3'	Report	Palacios (yellow card) 8'	Stadium: Toyota Stadium; Attendance: 19,096; Referee: Sergii Boiko

July 4, 2023 21	FC Dallas	0–1	D.C. United	Frisco, Texas
7:30PM CDT (UTC-05)		Report	Canouse (yellow card) 28'; O'Brien (yellow card) 45+1'; Fountas 73'; Klich (yellow card) 90+11'	Stadium: Toyota Stadium; Attendance: 19,096; Referee: Mark Allatin

July 8, 2023 22	Colorado Rapids	2–1	FC Dallas	Commerce City, Colorado
8:30PM CDT (UTC-05)	Rosenberry (yellow card) 25'; Maxsø 31'; Gutman (yellow card) 45+2'; Galván 62' (pen.); Bassett (yellow card) 68'; Acosta (yellow card) 81'; Barrios (yellow card) 83'	Report	Junqua 18'; Ibeagha (yellow card) 74'	Stadium: Dick's Sporting Goods Park; Attendance: 18,171; Referee: Marcos de Oliveira

July 15, 2023 23	Seattle Sounders FC	1–1	FC Dallas	Seattle, Washington
9:30PM CDT (UTC-05)	Junqua 18' (o.g); Rusnák (yellow card) 87'	Report	Kamungo 42'; Jesus (yellow card) 44'; Lletget (yellow card) 47'; Ntsabeleng (yellow card) 82'; Quignón (yellow card) 86'	Stadium: Lumen Field; Attendance: 32,753; Referee: Nima Saghafi

August 26, 2023 24 Copa Tejas	FC Dallas	1–0	Austin FC	Frisco, Texas
7:30PM CDT (UTC-05)	Arriola (yellow card) 13'; Farfan (yellow card) 27'; Jiménez (yellow card) 56'; Illarramendi (yellow card) 74'; Tafari 90+7'	Report	Pereira (yellow card) 45' (yellow-red card) 67'	Stadium: Toyota Stadium; Attendance: 18,267; Referee: Rubiel Vazquez

August 30, 2023 25	St. Louis City SC	2–1	FC Dallas	St. Louis, Missouri
7:30PM CDT (UTC-05)	Stroud (yellow card) 44'; Markanich 82'; Thórisson 85'; Vassilev (yellow card) 90+4'	Report	Paes (red card) 12'; Obrain (yellow card) 46'; Farfan (yellow card) 60'; Illarramendi (yellow card) 67'; Quignon (yellow card) 75'; Ansah 90+5'	Stadium: CityPark; Attendance: 22,423; Referee: Guido Gonzales Jr.

September 2, 2023 26	FC Dallas	2–2	Atlanta United FC	Frisco, Texas
7:30PM CDT (UTC-05)	Arriola 4'; Velasco (yellow card) 53'; Kamungo 62'; Ibeagha (yellow card) 69'	Report	Sosa (yellow card) 7'; Giakoumakis (yellow card) 21', (goal) 44'; Lobzhanidze 58'	Stadium: Toyota Stadium; Attendance: 17,441; Referee: Ismir Pekmic

September 16, 2023 27	FC Dallas	1–1	Seattle Sounders FC	Frisco, Texas
7:30PM CDT (UTC-05)	Obrian 15', (yellow card) 79'; Arriola (yellow card) 41'	Report	A. Roldán 57'	Stadium: Toyota Stadium; Attendance: 19,096; Referee: Allen Chapman

September 20, 2023 28	Real Salt Lake	1–3	FC Dallas	Sandy, Utah
8:30PM CDT (UTC-05)	Kreilach (yellow card) 20'; Arango 43'; Silva (yellow card) 60'	Report	Arriola 56'; Ferreira 62' (pen.), 71'	Stadium: America First Field; Attendance: 17,842; Referee: Pierre-Luc Lauziere

September 23, 2023 29 Pioneer Cup	FC Dallas	1–1	Columbus Crew	Frisco, Texas
7:30PM CDT (UTC-05)	Obrain 43'; Arriola (yellow card) 59'; Illarramendi (yellow card) 85'	Report	Tafari 24' (o.g.); Zawadzki (yellow card) 52'; Camacho (yellow card) 60'	Stadium: Toyota Stadium; Attendance: 17,948; Referee: Tori Penso

September 27, 2023 30	Philadelphia Union	1–1	FC Dallas	Chester, Pennsylvania
6:30PM CDT (UTC-05)	Mbaizo (yellow card) 21'; Bueno (yellow card) 24'; Sullivan 25'	Report	Velasco (yellow card) 28', (goal) 36'; Twumasi (yellow card) 90+1'	Stadium: Subaru Park; Attendance: 18,515; Referee: Fotis Bazakos
Note: Game originally scheduled for August 20th.

September 30, 2023 31 Texas Derby	Houston Dynamo FC	0–0	FC Dallas	Houston, Texas
7:30PM CDT (UTC-05)	Hadebe (yellow card) 8'; Franco (yellow card) 29'; Carrasquilla (yellow card) 71'; Herrera (yellow card) 84'	Report	Tafari (yellow card) 41'	Stadium: Shell Energy Stadium; Attendance: 18,175; Referee: Ismail Elfath

October 7, 2023 33	FC Dallas	1–1	San Jose Earthquakes	Frisco, Texas
7:30PM CDT (UTC-05)	Obrian 57'; Ibeagha (yellow card) 60'; Twumasi (yellow card) 90+2'	Report	Ebobisse 3', (yellow card) 21'	Stadium: Toyota Stadium; Attendance: 17,474; Referee: Filip Dujic

October 14, 2023 32	FC Dallas	1–1	Colorado Rapids	Frisco, Texas
7:30PM CDT (UTC-05)	Velasco 37'; Pomykal (yellow card) 42'	Report	Priso (yellow card) 2'; Navarro 25'; Lewis (yellow card) 54'	Stadium: Toyota Stadium; Attendance: 16,014; Referee: Marcos de Oliveira
Note: Game rescheduled from October 4 due to inclement weather in the area.

October 21, 2023 34	LA Galaxy	1–4	FC Dallas	Carson, California
8:00PM CDT (UTC-05)	Edwards 24', (yellow card) 45+5'; Cerrillo (yellow card) 45+1'; Yoshida (yellow card) 73'; Pérez (yellow card) 79'	Report	Kamungo 4', 30'; Twumasi 12'; Obrian 45+2'; Illarramendi (yellow card) 70'	Stadium: Dignity Health Sports Park; Attendance: 22,491; Referee: Victor Rivas

==== MLS Cup Playoffs ====
===== Round One =====
October 30, 2023 Game 1	Seattle Sounders FC	2–0	FC Dallas	Seattle, Washington
8:00PM CDT (UTC-05)	Rusnák 43' (pen.); Ragen (yellow card) 52'; Morris 74'	Report	Ferreira (yellow card) 45+3'; Tafari (yellow card) 81'	Stadium: Lumen Field; Attendance: 30,741; Referee: Joseph Dickerson

November 4, 2023 Game 2	FC Dallas	3–1	Seattle Sounders FC	Frisco, Texas
8:00PM CDT (UTC-05)	Arriola 6', (yellow card) 30'; Ferreira 18' (pen.); Pomykal (yellow card) 60'; Illarramendi (yellow card) 71'; Obrian 89'	Report	Nouhou (yellow card) 10'; Yeimar (yellow card) 21'; Morris 48'; Atencio (yellow card) 52'	Stadium: Toyota Stadium; Attendance: 19,096; Referee: Rosendo Mendoza

November 10, 2023 Game 3	Seattle Sounders FC	1–0	FC Dallas	Seattle, Washington
9:00PM CST (UTC-06)	Rusnák 36'	Report	Obrian (yellow card) 35'; Twumasi (yellow card) 71'; Arriola (yellow card) 85'	Stadium: Lumen Field; Attendance: 33,048; Referee: Fotis Bazakos
Note: Seattle Sounders FC won the series 2–1.

=== Leagues Cup ===
==== South 4 ====
Pos	Team	Pld	W	PW	PL	L	GF	GA	GD	Pts	Qualification	CLT	DAL	NEC
1	(United States) Charlotte FC	2	1	1	0	0	6	3	+3	5	Advance to knockout stage	—	—	—
2	(United States) FC Dallas	2	1	0	1	0	5	2	+3	4	Advance to knockout stage	2–2	—	3–0
3	(Mexico) Necaxa	2	0	0	0	2	1	7	−6	0		1–4	—	—

Source: Leagues Cup
Rules for classification: Tiebreakers

July 21, 2023 Group Stage	FC Dallas (United States)	2–2 (1–4 p)	(United States) Charlotte FC	Frisco, Texas
7:30PM CDT (UTC-05)	Kamungo 45'; Jesus (yellow card) 69'; Lletget 75'	Report	Arfield (yellow card) 52'; Privett (yellow card) 55'; Świderski 61' (pen.); Westwood (yellow card) 68'; Bender 90+7'	Stadium: Toyota Stadium; Attendance: 10,425; Referee: Jorge Abraham Camacho Peregrina
	Penalties
	Lletget (penalty missed); Farfan (penalty missed); Ferreira (penalty scored)		(penalty scored) Świderski; (penalty scored) Bender; (penalty scored) Cambridge; (penalty scored) Agyemang

July 25, 2023 Group Stage	FC Dallas (United States)	3–0	(Mexico) Necaxa	Frisco, Texas
7:30PM CDT (UTC-05)	Lletget 24'; Velasco (yellow card) 28'; Jesus (yellow card) 39'; Ansah 62'; Ferreira 73'	Report	Montes (red card) 11'; González (yellow card) 45+2'; Gutiérrez (yellow card) 45+2'; Colorado (yellow card) 47'; Rodríguez (yellow card) 90+3'	Stadium: Toyota Stadium; Attendance: 6,149; Referee: Joseph Dickerson

August 2, 2023 Round of 32	FC Dallas (United States)	2–1	(Mexico) Mazatlán	Frisco, Texas
8:00PM CDT (UTC-05)	Junqua (yellow card) 42'; Velasco 48' (pen.); Ansah 75'	Report	Intriago (yellow card) 31'; Merolla (yellow card) 46'; Montaño 57'	Stadium: Toyota Stadium; Attendance: 6,844; Referee: Oshane Nation

August 6, 2023 Round of 16	FC Dallas (United States)	4–4 (3–5 p)	(United States) Inter Miami CF	Frisco, Texas
8:30PM CDT (UTC-05)	Tafari (yellow card) 16'; Quignón 37'; Kamungo 45'; Velasco 63'; Taylor 68' (o.g.)	Report	Messi 6', 85'; Cremaschi 65'; Busquets (yellow card) 74'; Farfan 80' (o.g.)	Stadium: Toyota Stadium; Attendance: 19,096; Referee: César Arturo Ramos
	Penalties
	Arriola (penalty scored); Pomykal (penalty missed); Quignón (penalty scored); Ferreira (penalty scored)		(penalty scored) Messi; (penalty scored) Busquets; (penalty scored) Campana; (penalty scored) Miller; (penalty scored) Cremaschi

=== U.S. Open Cup ===
May 10, 2023 Round of 32	Nashville SC (Tennessee)	2–0	(Texas) FC Dallas	Nashville, Tennessee
7:30 PM CDT	Picault 63'; Muyl 76'	Report	Jesus (yellow card) 72'; Velasco (yellow card) 88'	Stadium: Geodis Park; Attendance: 5,196; Referee: Lukasz Szpala

== Statistics ==
=== Appearances ===
Numbers outside parentheses denote appearances as starter.
Numbers in parentheses denote appearances as substitute.
Players with no appearances are not included in the list.

As of final match played November 10, 2023

No.	Pos.	Nat.	Name	MLS	U.S. Open Cup	Leagues Cup	Total
No.	Pos.	Nat.	Name	Apps	Apps	Apps	Apps
1	GK	USA	Jimmy Maurer	4(1)	1	1	6(1)
2	DF	BRA	Geovane Jesus	11(8)	1	4	16(8)
3	DF	ESP	José Martínez	16(6)	0	2(1)	18(7)
4	DF	USA	Marco Farfan	32(2)	1	3	36(2)
5	MF	ARG	Facundo Quignón	22(7)	(1)	3	25(8)
7	FW	USA	Paul Arriola	23(2)	0	(3)	23(5)
8	FW	COL	Jáder Obrian	23(9)	(1)	4	27(10)
9	FW	ESP	Jesús Jiménez	8(15)	0	0	8(15)
10	FW	USA	Jesús Ferreira	27(2)	1	4	32(2)
11	FW	USA	Dante Sealy	2(11)	0	0	2(11)
12	MF	USA	Sebastian Lletget	15(5)	1	4	20(5)
14	MF	ESP	Asier Illarramendi	10(4)	0	0	10(4)
16	FW	RSA	Tsiki Ntsabeleng	3(13)	1	(3)	4(16)
17	DF	USA	Nkosi Tafari	30(3)	0	3(1)	33(4)
18	MF	CAN	Liam Fraser	6(4)	0	0	6(4)
19	MF	USA	Paxton Pomykal	22(5)	1	(3)	23(8)
20	FW	ARG	Alan Velasco	28(1)	(1)	4	32(2)
21	FW	COL	José Mulato	(7)	0	0	(7)
22	DF	GHA	Ema Twumasi	21(5)	1	(1)	22(6)
23	DF	USA	Collin Smith	2	0	0	2
24	DF	ALB	Amet Korça	2(2)	(1)	0	2(3)
25	DF	USA	Sebastien Ibeagha	29(5)	1	3(1)	33(6)
27	FW	USA	Herbert Endeley	2(6)	0	0	2(6)
29	DF	USA	Sam Junqua	11(14)	1	1(2)	13(16)
30	GK	NED	Maarten Paes	33	0	3	36
31	FW	GHA	Eugene Ansah	(11)	0	(4)	(15)
32	DF	USA	Nolan Norris	2	0	0	2
77	FW	TAN	Bernard Kamungo	8(11)	(1)	4	12(12)
Player(s) exiting club mid-season that made appearance
6	MF	USA	Edwin Cerrillo	15(4)	1	1(1)	17(5)

=== Goals and assists ===
As of final match played November 10, 2023
Player name(s) in italics transferred out mid-season.

No.	Pos.	Name	MLS		U.S. Open Cup		Leagues Cup		Total	
No.	Pos.	Name	Goals	Assists	Goals	Assists	Goals	Assists	Goals	Assists
2	DF	(Brazil) Geovane Jesus	0	2	0	0	0	0	0	2
3	DF	(Spain) José Martínez	1	2	0	0	0	0	1	2
4	DF	(United States) Marco Farfan	1	3	0	0	0	1	1	4
5	MF	(Argentina) Facundo Quignón	1	2	0	0	1	0	2	2
6	MF	(United States) Edwin Cerrillo	0	1	0	0	0	0	0	1
7	MF	(United States) Paul Arriola	3	4	0	0	0	0	2	4
8	FW	(Colombia) Jáder Obrian	7	4	0	0	0	0	7	4
9	FW	(Spain) Jesús Jiménez	0	3	0	0	0	0	0	3
10	FW	(United States) Jesús Ferreira	13	6	0	0	1	3	14	9
12	MF	(United States) Sebastian Lletget	0	3	0	0	2	1	2	4
14	MF	(Spain) Asier Illarramendi	0	1	0	0	0	0	0	1
16	FW	(South Africa) Tsiki Ntsabeleng	0	4	0	0	0	0	0	4
17	DF	(United States) Nkosi Tafari	3	4	0	0	0	0	3	4
19	MF	(United States) Paxton Pomykal	0	3	0	0	0	0	0	3
20	FW	(Argentina) Alan Velasco	4	3	0	0	2	0	6	3
22	DF	(Ghana) Ema Twumasi	1	1	0	0	0	0	1	1
25	DF	(United States) Sebastien Ibeagha	1	1	0	0	0	0	1	1
29	DF	(United States) Sam Junqua	2	0	0	0	0	0	2	0
31	FW	(Ghana) Eugene Ansah	1	0	0	0	2	0	3	0
77	FW	(Tanzania) Bernard Kamungo	6	1	0	0	2	2	8	3
			0	0	0	0	1	0	1	0
Total			44	48	0	0	11	7	55	55

=== Disciplinary record ===
As of final match played November 10, 2023
Player name(s) in italics transferred out mid-season.

No.	Pos.	Name	MLS		U.S. Open Cup		Leagues Cup		Total	
No.	Pos.	Name	Booked	Sent off (straight red)	Booked	Sent off (straight red)	Booked	Sent off (straight red)	Booked	Sent off (straight red)
2	DF	(Brazil) Geovane Jesus	5	0	1	0	2	0	8	0
3	DF	(Spain) José Martínez	1	0	0	0	0	0	1	0
4	DF	(United States) Marco Farfan	5	0	0	0	0	0	5	0
5	MF	(Argentina) Facundo Quignón	3	0	0	0	0	0	3	0
6	MF	(United States) Edwin Cerrillo	6	0	0	0	0	0	6	0
7	MF	(United States) Paul Arriola	6	0	0	0	0	0	6	0
8	FW	(Colombia) Jáder Obrian	8	0	0	0	0	0	8	0
9	FW	(Spain) Jesús Jiménez	1	0	0	0	0	0	1	0
10	FW	(United States) Jesús Ferreira	3	0	0	0	0	0	3	0
12	MF	(United States) Sebastian Lletget	3	0	0	0	0	0	3	0
14	MF	(Spain) Asier Illarramendi	5	0	0	0	0	0	5	0
16	FW	(South Africa) Tsiki Ntsabeleng	3	0	0	0	0	0	3	0
17	DF	(United States) Nkosi Tafari	5	0	0	0	1	0	6	0
19	MF	(United States) Paxton Pomykal	6	0	0	0	0	0	6	0
20	FW	(Argentina) Alan Velasco	6	0	1	0	1	0	8	0
21	FW	(Colombia) José Mulato	1	0	0	0	0	0	1	0
22	DF	(Ghana) Ema Twumasi	4	1	0	0	0	0	4	1
25	DF	(United States) Sebastien Ibeagha	4	0	0	0	0	0	4	0
29	DF	(United States) Sam Junqua	0	0	0	0	1	0	1	0
30	GK	(Netherlands) Maarten Paes	1	1	0	0	0	0	1	1
32	DF	(United States) Nolan Norris	1	0	0	0	0	0	1	0
Total			77	2	2	0	5	0	84	2

=== Goalkeeper stats ===
As of final match played November 10, 2023

No.	Name	Total				Major League Soccer				U.S. Open Cup				Leagues Cup			
No.	Name	MIN	GA	GAA	SV	MIN	GA	GAA	SV	MIN	GA	GAA	SV	MIN	GA	GAA	SV
30	(Netherlands) Maarten Paes	3165	38	1.08	113	2895	33	1.03	105	0	0	0	0	270	5	1.67	8
1	(United States) Jimmy Maurer	615	12	1.76	14	435	8	1.66	12	90	2	2	0	90	2	2	2
	TOTALS	3780	50	1.19	127	3330	41	1.11	117	90	2	2	0	360	7	1.75	10

== Kits ==
Primary	Secondary	Secondary Alt.	One Planet Kit

Type	Shirt	Shorts	Socks	First appearance / Info
Primary	Red / Blue hoops	Blue / Red stripes	Blue / Red hoops	MLS, March 4, 2023 against LA Galaxy
Secondary	White / Green flames	White / Black stripes	White / Red/Black hoops	MLS, March 25, 2023 against Los Angeles FC
Secondary Alternate	White / Green flames	Black / White stripes	Black / Red/White hoops	MLS, February 25, 2023 against Minnesota United FC
One Planet Kit	Black	Black / Turquoise stripes	Black / Turquoise hoops	MLS, April 22, 2023 against New York City FC
