= 2022 FC Dallas season =

FC Dallas
2022 season
- Owner: Clark and Dan Hunt
- Head coach: Nico Estévez
- Stadium: Toyota Stadium
- MLS: Conference: 3rd Overall: 7th
- MLS Cup Playoffs: Conference semifinals
- U.S. Open Cup: Round of 32
- Top goalscorer: League: Jesús Ferreira (18); All: Jesús Ferreira (18)
- Highest home attendance: 19,096 (Multiple games)
- Lowest home attendance: 2,287 (April 19 vs. FC Tulsa) U.S. Open Cup
- Average home league attendance: 16,615
- Biggest win: 4–1 (March 19 vs. Portland Timbers) & (August 13 vs. San Jose Earthquakes); 3–0 (September 3 at Minnesota United FC)
- Biggest defeat: 0–4 (August 21 at Nashville SC)
Primary colors	Secondary colors

The 2022 FC Dallas season was the Major League Soccer club's 27th season and first under new head coach Nico Estévez. FC Dallas continues to use Toyota Stadium as their home stadium and participated in the U.S. Open Cup tournament after a two-year hiatus due to the COVID-19 pandemic. The regular season started on February 26, 2022 against Toronto FC.

== Transfers ==
=== In ===
No.	Pos.	Nat.	Name	Age	Moving from	Type	Transfer window	Ends	Transfer fee	Source
31	DF	(Guinea-Bissau)	Nanu	27	Porto (Portugal)	Loan	Pre-season		Undisclosed	
15	FW	(United States)	Isaiah Parker	19	Saint Louis (United States)	Signed Draft Pick	Pre-season		Generation Adidas	
7	MF	(United States)	Paul Arriola	26	D.C. United (United States)	Transfer	Pre-season		Allocation money	
26	DF	(United States)	Lucas Bartlett	24	St. John's (United States)	Signed Draft Pick	Pre-season		One-year contract with club options for the 2023, 2024 and 2025 season.	
20	MF	(Argentina)	Alan Velasco	19	Independiente (Argentina)	Transfer	Pre-season		Four-year contract with a club option for the 2026 season	
4	DF	(United States)	Marco Farfan	23	Los Angeles FC (United States)	Trade	Pre-season		Acquired in exchange for Ryan Hollingshead	
16	FW	(South Africa)	Tsiki Ntsabeleng	24	Oregon State (United States)	Signed Draft Pick	Pre-season		One-year contract with club options for the 2023, 2024 and 2025 season.	
13	GK	(United States)	Antonio Carrera	17	FC Dallas Academy (United States)	Transfer	Pre-season		Three-year contract with club options for the 2025 and 2026 seasons	
28	DF	(Ecuador)	Joshué Quiñónez	20	Barcelona S.C. (Ecuador)	Loan	Mid-season		On loan for remainder of the 2022 MLS season with an option for a permanent transfer	
30	GK	(Netherlands)	Maarten Paes	24	FC Utrecht (Netherlands)	Transfer	Mid-season		Exercise permanent transfer with FC Utrecht. Signed through December 2025 with club option years for the 2026 and 2027 seasons.	
12	MF	(United States)	Sebastian Lletget	29	New England Revolution (United States)	Transfer	Mid-season		Acquired in exchange for $300,000 in General Allocation; Money (GAM) in 2022 and $300,000 in GAM in 2023	
77	MF	(Tanzania)	Bernard Kamungo	20	North Texas SC (United States)	Transfer	Mid-season		Four-year contract with club options for 2026 and 2027 seasons.	

==== Draft picks ====
Round	Selection	Pos.	Name	College	Signed	Source
1	3	FW	(United States) Isaiah Parker	Saint Louis	Signed	
1	6	DF	(United States) Lucas Bartlett	St. John's	Signed	
1	28	FW	(South Africa) Tsiki Ntsabeleng	Oregon State	Signed	
3	62	GK	(United States) Alec Smir	North Carolina	Signed with Minnesota United FC 2	
3	66	DF	(United States) Chase Niece	Saint Louis	Signed with North Texas SC	
4	87	DF	(United States) Holland Rula	Wake Forest	Unsigned	

=== Out ===
No.	Pos.	Nat.	Name	Age	Moving to	Type	Transfer window	Transfer fee	Source
99	GK	(Brazil)	Phelipe Megiolaro	22	Grêmio (Brazil)	End of Loan	Pre-season	Free	
10	MF	(Colombia)	Andrés Ricaurte	30	Independiente Medellín (Colombia)	End of Loan	Pre-season	Free	
17	MF	(Venezuela)	Freddy Vargas	22	Deportivo Lara (Venezuela)	End of Loan	Pre-season	Free	
44	DF	(Guinea-Bissau)	Caiser Gomes	21	North Texas SC (United States)	End of Loan	Pre-season	Free	
4	DF	(Brazil)	Bressan	29	Avaí FC (Brazil)	Option Declined	Pre-season	Free	
26	DF	(United States)	John Nelson	23	FC Cincinnati (United States)	Option Declined	Pre-season	Free	
8	MF	(Honduras)	Bryan Acosta	28	Colorado Rapids (United States)	Option Declined	Pre-season	Free	
25	GK	(United States)	Kyle Zobeck	31	N/A	Retired	Pre-season	Free	
16	MF	(United States)	Ricardo Pepi	19	FC Augsburg (Germany)	Transfer	Pre-season	$20 million fee plus add-ons	
12	DF	(United States)	Ryan Hollingshead	30	Los Angeles FC (United States)	Trade	Pre-season	Traded in exchange for Marco Farfan	
11	FW	(Hungary)	Szabolcs Schön	21	Fehérvár FC (Hungary)	Transfer	Mid-season	Transfer agreement with Hungarian first-division side MOL Fehérvár FC	

== Club ==
=== Roster ===
As of August 30, 2022. Note: Flags indicate national team as defined under FIFA eligibility rules; some limited exceptions apply. Players may hold more than one non-FIFA nationality.

No.	Pos.	Nation	Player
1	GK	USA	Jimmy Maurer
2	DF	USA	Eddie Munjoma (HG)
3	DF	ESP	José Martínez
4	DF	USA	Marco Farfan
5	MF	ARG	Facundo Quignón
6	MF	USA	Edwin Cerrillo (HG)
7	MF	USA	Paul Arriola
8	FW	COL	Jáder Obrian
10	FW	USA	Jesús Ferreira (HG, DP)
12	MF	USA	Sebastian Lletget
13	GK	USA	Antonio Carrera (HG)
14	FW	BIH	Beni Redžić (HG)
15	FW	USA	Isaiah Parker (GA)
16	FW	RSA	Tsiki Ntsabeleng
17	DF	USA	Nkosi Tafari

No.	Pos.	Nation	Player
18	MF	USA	Brandon Servania (HG)
19	MF	USA	Paxton Pomykal (HG)
20	MF	ARG	Alan Velasco (DP)
21	MF	USA	Kalil ElMedkhar
22	FW	GHA	Ema Twumasi (GA)
23	MF	USA	Thomas Roberts (HG)
24	DF	USA	Matt Hedges
25	DF	USA	Collin Smith (HG)
26	DF	USA	Lucas Bartlett
28	DF	ECU	Joshué Quiñónez (on loan from Barcelona S.C.)
29	FW	ARG	Franco Jara (DP)
30	GK	NED	Maarten Paes
31	DF	GBS	Nanu (on loan from Porto)
77	MF	TAN	Bernard Kamungo

=== Out on loan ===
Note: Flags indicate national team as defined under FIFA eligibility rules; some limited exceptions apply. Players may hold more than one non-FIFA nationality.

No.	Pos.	Nation	Player
—	FW	USA	Dante Sealy (HG) (on loan to Jong PSV)
46	DF	USA	Justin Che (HG) (on loan to TSG 1899 Hoffenheim)
80	MF	USA	Nicky Hernandez (on loan to San Antonio FC)

== Competitions ==
=== Preseason ===
February 1, 2022	FC Dallas	Canceled	U.S. U-20 MNT	Bradenton, Florida
4:30 p.m. CST (UTC-06)				Stadium: IMG Academy Stadium

February 5, 2022	Orlando City SC	0–1	FC Dallas	Kissimmee, Florida
10:00 a.m. CST (UTC-06)		Report	Servania 32'	Stadium: Osceola County Stadium; Attendance: 0

February 12, 2022	FC Dallas	6–0	San Antonio FC	Frisco, Texas
1:00 p.m. CST (UTC-06)	Obrian 4', 6'; Ferreira 17' (pen.), 29', 33'; Arriola 68'	Report		Stadium: Toyota Stadium

February 16, 2022	Chicago Fire FC	0–0	FC Dallas	Austin, Texas
11:00 a.m. CST (UTC-06)		Report		Stadium: St. David's Performance Center

February 19, 2022	FC Dallas	2–1	Houston Dynamo FC	Frisco, Texas
6:00 p.m. CST (UTC-06)	Ferreira 4'; Pomykal 57'	Report	Baird 76'	Stadium: Toyota Stadium

=== MLS ===
==== Western Conference standings ====
Western Conference

Pos	Team	Pld	W	L	T	GF	GA	GD	Pts	Qualification
1	Los Angeles FC	34	21	9	4	66	38	+28	67	Qualification for the conference semifinals and the CONCACAF Champions League
2	Austin FC	34	16	10	8	65	49	+16	56	Qualification for the first round and the CONCACAF Champions League
3	FC Dallas	34	14	9	11	48	37	+11	53	Qualification for the first round
4	LA Galaxy	34	14	12	8	58	51	+7	50	Qualification for the first round
5	Nashville SC	34	13	10	11	52	41	+11	50	Qualification for the first round

Source: MLS
Rules for classification: 1) points; 2) total wins; 3) total goal differential; 4) total goals scored; 5) fewer disciplinary points; 6) away goal differential; 7) away goals scored; 8) home goals differential; 9) home goals scored; 10) coin toss (2 clubs tied) or drawing of lots (≥3 clubs tied)

==== Overall standings ====
Pos	Team	Pld	W	L	T	GF	GA	GD	Pts
5	New York City FC	34	16	11	7	57	41	+16	55
6	New York Red Bulls	34	15	11	8	50	41	+9	53
7	FC Dallas	34	14	9	11	48	37	+11	53
8	LA Galaxy	34	14	12	8	58	51	+7	50
9	Nashville SC	34	13	10	11	52	41	+11	50

Source: MLS
Rules for classification: 1) points; 2) total wins; 3) total goal differential; 4) total goals scored; 5) fewer disciplinary points; 6) away goal differential; 7) away goals scored; 8) home goals differential; 9) home goals scored; 10) coin toss (2 clubs tied) or drawing of lots (≥3 clubs tied)

==== Results summary ====
Overall								Home						Away					
Pld	W	D	L	GF	GA	GD	Pts	W	D	L	GF	GA	GD	W	D	L	GF	GA	GD
34	14	11	9	48	37	+11	53	10	4	3	28	15	+13	4	7	6	20	22	−2

Last updated: October 9, 2022.
Source: Regular Season

==== Results by round ====
Round	1	2	3	4	5	6	7	8	9	10	11	12	13	14	15	16	17	18	19	20	21	22	23	24	25	26	27	28	29	30	31	32	33	34
Stadium	H	A	H	H	A	H	A	H	A	H	A	A	H	A	H	A	A	H	A	H	H	A	H	A	A	H	H	A	H	A	H	A	A	H
Result	D	L	W	W	D	W	D	W	D	W	W	L	L	W	L	D	L	D	D	L	D	W	W	L	D	W	W	L	D	W	W	D	L	W

Updated to match(es) played on October 9, 2022. Source: Regular Season
A = Away; H = Home; W = Win; D = Draw; L = Loss

==== Regular season ====
Kickoff times are in CDT (UTC-05) unless shown otherwise

February 26, 2022 1	FC Dallas	1–1	Toronto FC	Frisco, Texas
4:30 p.m. CST (UTC-06)	Obrian 9' (yellow card) 45+2'	Report	Shaffelburg (yellow card) 19'; Osorio 45'	Stadium: Toyota Stadium; Attendance: 12,233; Referee: Jair Marrufo

March 5, 2022 2	New England Revolution	1–0	FC Dallas	Foxborough, Massachusetts
12:30 p.m. CST (UTC-06)	Gil 45+2' (pen.); Altidore (yellow card) 70'; Polster (yellow card) 78'	Report	Pomykal (yellow card) 22'; Obrian (yellow card) 53'	Stadium: Gillette Stadium; Attendance: 14,554; Referee: Ted Unkel

March 12, 2022 3	FC Dallas	2–0	Nashville SC	Frisco, Texas
7:30 p.m. CST (UTC-06)	Pomykal (yellow card) 25'; Martínez (yellow card) 33'; Jara 85' (pen.); Velasco 87'; Cerrillo (yellow card) 90+6'	Report	Sapong (yellow card) 28'; Leal (yellow card) 40'; Muyl (yellow card) 62'; Godoy (yellow card) 82'	Stadium: Toyota Stadium; Attendance: 13,448; Referee: Ramy Touchan

March 19, 2022 4	FC Dallas	4–1	Portland Timbers	Frisco, Texas
7:30 p.m. CDT (UTC-05)	Ferreira 26', 30', 36'; Velasco (yellow card) 44'; Nanu (yellow card) 76'; Arriola 77'	Report	Niezgoda 61'	Stadium: Toyota Stadium; Attendance: 19,096; Referee: Allen Chapman

April 2, 2022 5 Brimstone Cup	Chicago Fire FC	0–0	FC Dallas	Chicago, Illinois
2:30 p.m. CDT (UTC-05)	Omsberg (yellow card) 38'; Espinoza (yellow card) 62'; Przybyłko (yellow card) 69'; Casas (yellow card) 89'	Report	Quignón (yellow card) 17'; Farfan (yellow card) 47'	Stadium: Soldier Field; Attendance: 11,411; Referee: Pierre Lauziere

April 9, 2022 6	FC Dallas	3–1	Colorado Rapids	Frisco, Texas
7:30 p.m. CDT (UTC-05)	Martínez (yellow card) 16'; Cerrillo (yellow card) 24'; Servania 45+2' (yellow card) 77'; Ferreira 51', 89'	Report	Kaye (yellow card) 2'; Rubio 30'; Max (yellow card) 40'; Barrios (yellow card) 45+1'	Stadium: Toyota Stadium; Attendance: 15,893; Referee: Lukasz Szpala

April 16, 2022 7	New York Red Bulls	0–0	FC Dallas	Harrison, New Jersey
6:00 p.m. CDT (UTC-05)	Cásseres Jr. (yellow card) 31'; Edwards (yellow card) 79'; Barlow (yellow card) 87'	Report	Servania (yellow card) 61'	Stadium: Red Bull Arena; Attendance: 14,456; Referee: Fotis Bazakos

April 23, 2022 8 Texas Derby	FC Dallas	2–1	Houston Dynamo FC	Frisco, Texas
2:00 p.m. CDT (UTC-05)	Farfan (yellow card) 2'; Cerrillo (yellow card) 71'; Ntsabeleng 87'; Quignón 90+3' (yellow card) 90+5'	Report	Ferreirra 33'; Dorsey (yellow card) 35'; Carrasquilla (yellow card) 78'; Bartlow (yellow card) 90+2'	Stadium: Toyota Stadium; Attendance: 15,792; Referee: Victor Rivas

April 30, 2022 9	Sporting Kansas City	2–2	FC Dallas	Kansas City, Kansas
7:30 p.m. CDT (UTC-05)	Russell 22' (pen.) (yellow card) 50'; Walter (yellow card) 27'; Ford (yellow card) 34'; Sallói 77'	Report	Ntsabeleng (yellow card) 87'; Velasco 36' (yellow card) 53'; Ferreira 42' (yellow card) 62'; Twumasi (yellow card) 44'; Servania (yellow card) 63' (yellow-red card) 67'; Paes (yellow card) 90+4'	Stadium: Children's Mercy Park; Attendance: 17,334; Referee: Nima Saghafi

May 7, 2022 10	FC Dallas	2–0	Seattle Sounders FC	Frisco, Texas
7:30 p.m. CDT (UTC-05)	Ferreira 65'; Arriola (yellow card) 86' (goal) 88'	Report	Vargas (yellow card) 45+1'	Stadium: Toyota Stadium; Attendance: 19,096; Referee: Allen Chapman

May 14, 2022 11	LA Galaxy	1–3	FC Dallas	Carson, California
9:30 p.m. CDT (UTC-05)	Costa 67' (yellow card) 77'; Coulibaly (yellow card) 90+5'	Report	Ferreira 11', 23'; Arriola 20' (yellow card) 75'; Ntsabeleng (yellow card) 26'; Farfan (yellow card) 64'	Stadium: Dignity Health Sports Park; Attendance: 25,174; Referee: Chris Penso

May 18, 2022 12	Vancouver Whitecaps FC	2–1	FC Dallas	Vancouver, British Columbia
9:00 p.m. CDT (UTC-05)	Baldisimo (yellow card) 40'; Brown (yellow card) 45'; White 71'; Cavallini 90+2' (pen.) (yellow card) 90+7'	Report	Arriola 45+3'; Pomykal (yellow card) 52'; Twumasi (yellow card) 90+7'	Stadium: BC Place; Attendance: 12,716; Referee: Ismir Pekmic

May 22, 2022 13	FC Dallas	1–2	Minnesota United FC	Frisco, Texas
6:00 p.m. CDT (UTC-05)	Twumasi (yellow card) 40'; Arriola 59'	Report	Lod 20'; Boxall (yellow card) 31'; Arriaga (yellow card) 33'; Fragapane (yellow card) 33'; Taylor 55'; Reynoso (yellow card) 78'; St. Clair (yellow card) 90+6'	Stadium: Toyota Stadium; Attendance: 15,280; Referee: Lukasz Szpala

May 28, 2022 14	Orlando City SC	1–3	FC Dallas	Orlando, Florida
6:30 p.m. CDT (UTC-05)	Méndez (yellow card) 12'; Kara 45+3'	Report	Ferreira (yellow card) 42'; Velasco (yellow card) 64'; Arriola 67', 84'; Jara 70'; Quignón (yellow card) 80'; Obrian (yellow card) 86'	Stadium: Exploria Stadium; Attendance: 17,380; Referee: Marcos de Oliveira

June 18, 2022 15	FC Dallas	0–2	Vancouver Whitecaps FC	Frisco, Texas
8:00 p.m. CDT (UTC-05)	Quignón (yellow card) 42'; Farfan (yellow card) 45+2'; Velasco (yellow card) 54'	Report	Cavallini 2'; Caicedo 44'	Stadium: Toyota Stadium; Attendance: 19,096; Referee: Tori Penso

June 25, 2022 16 Copa Tejas	Austin FC	2–2	FC Dallas	Austin, Texas
8:00 p.m. CDT (UTC-05)	Jiménez (yellow card) 10'; Gabrielsen (yellow card) 20'; Felipe (yellow card) 45+1'; Driussi 72'; Hoesen 85'	Report	Arriola 58'; Servania 64'; Martínez (yellow card) 82'	Stadium: Q2 Stadium; Attendance: 20,738; Referee: Allen Chapman

June 29, 2022 17	Los Angeles FC	3–1	FC Dallas	Los Angeles, California
9:30 p.m. CDT (UTC-05)	Musovski 23'; Arrango 57'; Cifuentes (yellow card) 82'; Opoku 86'	Report	Servania (yellow card) 12'; Ferreira 38'; Tafari (yellow card) 44'	Stadium: Banc of California Stadium; Attendance: 22,014; Referee: Marcos de Oliveira

July 4, 2022 18	FC Dallas	1–1	Inter Miami CF	Frisco, Texas
8:00 p.m. CDT (UTC-05)	Velasco 27'	Report	Campana (yellow card) 85' (goal) 89'	Stadium: Toyota Stadium; Attendance: 19,096; Referee: Alex Chilowicz

July 9, 2022 19 Texas Derby	Houston Dynamo FC	2–2	FC Dallas	Houston, Texas
7:30 p.m. CDT (UTC-05)	Steres (yellow card) 41'; Lundqvist (yellow card) 47'; Úlfarsson 69'; Zeca (yellow card) 86'; Hadebe 90+11'	Report	Hedges (yellow card) 17' (goal) 27'; Quignón (yellow card) 22'; Ferreira (yellow card) 87' (goal) 90+3'; Farfan (yellow card) 88'; Servania (yellow card) 90+8' (yellow-red card) 90+13'	Stadium: PNC Stadium; Attendance: 21,284; Referee: Jon Freemon

July 13, 2022 20	FC Dallas	0–1	New York City FC	Frisco, Texas
8:00 p.m. CDT (UTC-05)	Ntsabeleng (yellow card) 50'; Jara (yellow card) 90+6'	Report	Chanot (yellow card) 8'; Héber 29'; Johnson (yellow card) 90+4'	Stadium: Toyota Stadium; Attendance: 13,656; Referee: Victor Rivas

July 16, 2022 21 Copa Tejas	FC Dallas	1–1	Austin FC	Frisco, Texas
8:00 p.m. CDT (UTC-05)	Arriola 42'; Velasco (yellow card) 70'	Report	Fagúndez 79'; Felipe (yellow card) 90+6'	Stadium: Toyota Stadium; Attendance: 16,833; Referee: Armando Villarreal

July 23, 2022 22	Real Salt Lake	0–1	FC Dallas	Sandy, Utah
9:00 p.m. CDT (UTC-05)	Ruiz (yellow card) 40'; Löffelsend (yellow card) 86'; Meram (yellow card) 86'; Glad (yellow card) 89'	Report	Ferreira 14' (yellow card) 88'; Velasco (yellow card) 22'; Obrian (yellow card) 86'; Cerrillo (yellow card) 90+3'; Paes (yellow card) 90+6'	Stadium: Rio Tinto Stadium; Attendance: 20,437; Referee: Matthew Conger

July 30, 2022 23	FC Dallas	1–0	LA Galaxy	Frisco, Texas
8:00 p.m. CDT (UTC-05)	Jara 9' (yellow card) 35'; Cerrillo (yellow card) 82'; Arriola (yellow card) 86'	Report	Gasper (yellow card) 22'; Zavaleta (yellow card) 38'; Edwards (yellow card) 53'; Araujo (yellow card) 62'	Stadium: Toyota Stadium; Attendance: 19,096; Referee: Pierre-Luc Lauziere

August 2, 2022 24	Seattle Sounders FC	1–0	FC Dallas	Seattle, Washington
9:00 p.m. CDT (UTC-05)	Yeimar (yellow card) 24'; Lodeiro 39' (pen.)	Report	Paes (yellow card) 39'	Stadium: Lumen Field; Attendance: 32,207; Referee: Allen Chapman

August 6, 2022 25	Portland Timbers	1–1	FC Dallas	Portland, Oregon
9:30 p.m. CDT (UTC-05)	Asprilla (yellow card) 24'; Williamson (yellow card) 78'; Loria 90+6'	Report	Twumasi (yellow card) 74'; Hedges (yellow card) 90+5'; Chará 90+10' (o.g.)	Stadium: Providence Park; Attendance: 24,114; Referee: Ted Unkel

August 13, 2022 26	FC Dallas	4–1	San Jose Earthquakes	Frisco, Texas
8:00 p.m. CDT (UTC-05)	Ferreira 3', 41'; Farfan 20'; Cerrillo (yellow card) 45'; Velasco 57'; Pomykal (yellow card) 67'	Report	Ebobisse 60'; Nathan (yellow card) 90+1'	Stadium: Toyota Stadium; Attendance: 15,106; Referee: Victor Rivas

August 17, 2022 27	FC Dallas	1–0	Philadelphia Union	Frisco, Texas
8:00 p.m. CDT (UTC-05)	Ferreira 34' (yellow card) 75'; Martínez (yellow card) 62'	Report	Gazdag (yellow card) 73'; Mbaizo (yellow card) 75'	Stadium: Toyota Stadium; Attendance: 12,479; Referee: Nima Saghafi

August 21, 2022 28	Nashville SC	4–0	FC Dallas	Nashville, Tennessee
7:30 p.m. CDT (UTC-05)	Mukhtar 5', 33'; Shaffelburg 26'; Romney 72'	Report	Pomykal (yellow card) 31'; Lletget (yellow card) 62'; Twumasi (yellow card) 67'	Stadium: Geodis Park; Attendance: 25,571; Referee: Kevin Stott

August 27, 2022 29	FC Dallas	1–1	Real Salt Lake	Frisco, Texas
8:00 p.m. CDT (UTC-05)	Velasco 7' (yellow card) 56'	Report	Löffelsend (yellow card) 36'; Chang (yellow card) 45'; Julio 69'	Stadium: Toyota Stadium; Attendance: 15,573; Referee: Ramy Touchan

September 3, 2022 30	Minnesota United FC	0–3	FC Dallas	Saint Paul, Minnesota
2:30 p.m. CDT (UTC-05)	Fragapane (yellow card) 20' (yellow-red card) 69'; Arriaga (yellow card) 80'	Report	Arriola (yellow card) 4'; Farfan (yellow card) 15'; Boxall 55' (o.g.); Velasco 56'; Ferreira 58'	Stadium: Allianz Field; Attendance: 19,761; Referee: Ismail Elfath

September 10, 2022 31	FC Dallas	2–1	Los Angeles FC	Frisco, Texas
7:30 p.m. CDT (UTC-05)	Ferreira 78', 81'	Report	Palacios (yellow card) 8'; Hollinghead (red card) 13'; Escobar (yellow card) 35'; Arango 45+4'	Stadium: Toyota Stadium; Attendance: 19,096; Referee: Jon Freemon

September 17, 2022 32	San Jose Earthquakes	1–1	FC Dallas	San Jose, California
9:30 p.m. CDT (UTC-05)	Ebobisse 24' (pen.); Nathan (yellow card) 58'	Report	Obrian (yellow card) 12' (goal) 16'; Farfan (yellow card) 34'; Martínez (yellow card) 60'; Cerrillo (yellow card) 68'; Arriola (red card) 83'	Stadium: PayPal Park; Attendance: 12,355; Referee: Drew Fischer

October 1, 2022 33	Colorado Rapids	1–0	FC Dallas	Commerce City, Colorado
2:30 p.m. CDT (UTC-05)	Rubio 66'; Vallecilla (red card) 77'; Yapi (yellow card) 90+2'; Yarbrough (yellow card) 90+4'	Report	Pomykal (yellow card) 39'	Stadium: Dick's Sporting Goods Park; Attendance: 17,193; Referee: Chris Penso

October 9, 2022 34	FC Dallas	2–1	Sporting Kansas City	Frisco, Texas
4:00 p.m. CDT (UTC-05)	Lletget 33'; Cerrillo (yellow card) 46'; Arriola 65'; Twumasi (yellow card) 80'	Report	Zusi 51'; Hernández (yellow card) 76'; Isimat-Mirin (yellow card) 79'	Stadium: Toyota Stadium; Attendance: 19,096; Referee: Victor Rivas

=== Mid-season exhibitions ===
Kickoff times are in CDT (UTC−05) unless shown otherwise

September 24, 2022 International Friendly	FC Dallas (United States)	0–3	(Mexico) Tigres UANL	Frisco, Texas
5:00 p.m. CDT (UTC−05)	Jara (yellow card) 34'	Report	Garza 45+3'; Vigón (yellow card) 34' (goal) 49'; Thauvin 70'	Stadium: Toyota Stadium; Referee: Lorenzo Hernandez

=== MLS Cup Playoffs ===
October 17, 2022 First round	FC Dallas	1–1 (a.e.t.) (5–4 p)	Minnesota United FC	Frisco, Texas
8:30 p.m. CDT (UTC-05)	Quignon 64'; Arriola (yellow card) 72'	Report	Reynoso 53'; Fragapane (yellow card) 73'; Taylor (yellow card) 105+1'	Stadium: Toyota Stadium; Attendance: 19,096; Referee: Ted Unkel
	Penalties
	Jara (penalty scored); Lletget (penalty scored); Hedges (penalty scored); Ferreira (penalty scored); Velasco (penalty scored)		(penalty scored) Reynoso; (penalty missed) Trapp; (penalty scored) Arriaga; (penalty scored) Benítez; (penalty scored) García

October 23, 2022 Conference semifinals	Austin FC	2–1	FC Dallas	Austin, Texas
7:00 p.m. CDT (UTC-05)	Djitté 26'; Driussi 29'; Cascante (yellow card) 59'; Rigoni (yellow card) 85'	Report	Quignón (yellow card) 28'; Velasco 65'; Hedges (yellow card) 72'	Stadium: Q2 Stadium; Attendance: 20,738; Referee: Joseph Dickerson

=== U.S. Open Cup ===
April 19, 2022 Third round	FC Dallas (Texas)	2–1	(Oklahoma) FC Tulsa	Frisco, Texas
7:30 PM CDT	Jara 32' (pen.); Cerrillo (yellow card) 53'; Obrian 55'	Report	Moloto (yellow card) 29'; Bourgeois 42' (yellow card) 86'; Williams (yellow card) 61'	Stadium: Toyota Stadium; Attendance: 2,287; Referee: Lorenzo Hernandez (Texas)

May 10, 2022 Round of 32	Sporting Kansas City	4–2 (a.e.t.)	(Texas) FC Dallas	Kansas City, Kansas
7:30 PM CDT	Davis (yellow card) 26'; Fontàs (yellow card) 42'; Vujnović 60'; Tzionis 90+8'; Cerrillo 94' (o.g.); Hernández (yellow card) 105+2'; Shelton 113'; Russell (yellow card) 120'	Report	Jara 8'; Munjoma 34'; Maurer (yellow card) 36'; Obrian (yellow card) 43'; Bartlett (yellow card) 63'; Ferreira (yellow card) 90+5'; Martínez (red card) 90+7'	Stadium: Children's Mercy Park; Attendance: 14,922; Referee: Malik Badawi (California)

== Statistics ==
=== Appearances ===
Numbers outside parentheses denote appearances as starter.
Numbers in parentheses denote appearances as substitute.
Players with no appearances are not included in the list.

As of final match played October 23, 2022

No.	Pos.	Nat.	Name	MLS	U.S. Open Cup	Total
No.	Pos.	Nat.	Name	Apps	Apps	Apps
1	GK	USA	Jimmy Maurer	2	2	4
2	DF	USA	Eddie Munjoma	1(2)	2	3(2)
3	DF	ESP	José Martínez	33	(1)	33(1)
4	DF	USA	Marco Farfan	34	0	34
5	MF	ARG	Facundo Quignón	16(10)	0	16(10)
6	MF	USA	Edwin Cerrillo	20(13)	2	22(13)
7	FW	USA	Paul Arriola	30(3)	0	30(3)
8	FW	COL	Jáder Obrian	15(17)	2	17(17)
10	FW	USA	Jesús Ferreira	31(4)	(2)	31(6)
12	MF	USA	Sebastian Lletget	11(1)	0	11(1)
14	FW	BIH	Beni Redžić	(6)	(2)	(8)
16	FW	RSA	Tsiki Ntsabeleng	11(15)	1	12(15)
17	DF	USA	Nkosi Tafari	11(16)	2	13(16)
18	MF	USA	Brandon Servania	16(9)	1(1)	17(10)
19	MF	USA	Paxton Pomykal	31(4)	0	31(4)
20	MF	ARG	Alan Velasco	26(3)	(2)	26(5)
21	MF	USA	Kalil ElMedkhar	1(4)	1(1)	2(5)
22	DF	GHA	Ema Twumasi	26(7)	1	27(7)
23	MF	USA	Thomas Roberts	0	(1)	(1)
24	DF	USA	Matt Hedges	28(2)	0	28(2)
26	DF	USA	Lucas Bartlett	0	2	2
28	DF	ECU	Joshué Quiñónez	1(7)	1(1)	2(8)
29	FW	ARG	Franco Jara	7(24)	2	9(24)
30	GK	NED	Maarten Paes	34	0	34
31	DF	GNB	Nanu	11(18)	1	12(18)
77	FW	TAN	Bernard Kamungo	(1)	0	(1)
Player(s) exiting club mid-season that made appearance
11	FW	HUN	Szabolcs Schön	0	2	2

=== Goals and assists ===
As of final match played October 23, 2022
Player name(s) in italics transferred out mid-season.

No.	Pos.	Name	MLS		U.S. Open Cup		Total	
No.	Pos.	Name	Goals	Assists	Goals	Assists	Goals	Assists
2	DF	(United States) Eddie Munjoma	0	0	1	0	1	0
3	DF	(Spain) José Martínez	0	1	0	0	0	1
4	DF	(United States) Marco Farfan	1	4	0	0	1	4
5	MF	(Argentina) Facundo Quignón	2	1	0	0	2	1
6	MF	(United States) Edwin Cerrillo	0	1	0	0	0	1
7	MF	(United States) Paul Arriola	10	7	0	0	10	7
8	FW	(Colombia) Jáder Obrian	2	4	1	1	3	5
10	FW	(United States) Jesús Ferreira	18	6	0	0	18	6
11	FW	(Hungary) Szabolcs Schön	0	0	0	1	0	1
12	MF	(United States) Sebastian Lletget	1	5	0	0	1	5
16	FW	(South Africa) Tsiki Ntsabeleng	1	0	0	0	1	0
18	MF	(United States) Brandon Servania	2	2	0	0	2	2
19	MF	(United States) Paxton Pomykal	0	5	0	0	0	5
20	FW	(Argentina) Alan Velasco	7	8	0	0	7	8
22	DF	(Ghana) Ema Twumasi	0	2	0	0	0	2
24	DF	(United States) Matt Hedges	1	1	0	0	1	1
29	FW	(Argentina) Franco Jara	3	1	2	0	5	1
31	DF	(Guinea-Bissau) Nanu	0	2	0	0	0	2
			2	0	0	0	2	0
Total			50	50	4	2	54	52

=== Disciplinary record ===
As of final match played October 23, 2022

No.	Pos.	Name	MLS		U.S. Open Cup		Total	
No.	Pos.	Name	Yellow card	Red card	Yellow card	Red card	Yellow card	Red card
1	GK	(United States) Jimmy Maurer	0	0	1	0	1	0
3	DF	(Spain) José Martínez	5	0	0	1	5	1
4	DF	(United States) Marco Farfan	7	0	0	0	7	0
5	MF	(Argentina) Facundo Quignón	6	0	0	0	6	0
6	MF	(United States) Edwin Cerrillo	8	0	1	0	9	0
7	FW	(United States) Paul Arriola	5	1	0	0	5	1
8	FW	(Colombia) Jáder Obrian	5	0	1	0	6	0
10	FW	(United States) Jesús Ferreira	5	0	1	0	6	0
12	MF	(United States) Sebastian Lletget	1	0	0	0	1	0
16	FW	(South Africa) Tsiki Ntsabeleng	3	0	0	0	3	0
17	DF	(United States) Nkosi Tafari	1	0	0	0	1	0
18	MF	(United States) Brandon Servania	5	2	0	0	5	2
19	MF	(United States) Paxton Pomykal	6	0	0	0	6	0
20	FW	(Argentina) Alan Velasco	7	0	0	0	7	0
22	MF	(Ghana) Ema Twumasi	6	0	0	0	6	0
24	DF	(United States) Matt Hedges	3	0	0	0	3	0
26	DF	(United States) Lucas Bartlett	0	0	1	0	1	0
29	FW	(Argentina) Franco Jara	2	0	0	0	2	0
30	GK	(Netherlands) Maarten Paes	3	0	0	0	3	0
31	DF	(Guinea-Bissau) Nanu	1	0	0	0	1	0
Total			78	3	5	1	83	4

=== Goalkeeper stats ===
As of final match played October 23, 2022

No.	Name	Total				Major League Soccer				U.S. Open Cup			
No.	Name	MIN	GA	GAA	SV	MIN	GA	GAA	SV	MIN	GA	GAA	SV
30	(Netherlands) Maarten Paes	3090	37	1.08	97	3090	37	1.08	97	0	0	0	0
1	(United States) Jimmy Maurer	390	8	2	12	180	3	1.5	5	210	5	2.5	7
	TOTALS	3480	45	1.18	109	3270	40	1.11	102	210	5	2.5	7

== Kits ==
Primary	Primary Alt.	Secondary	Primeblue

Type	Shirt	Shorts	Socks	First appearance / Info
Primary	Red / Blue hoops	Blue / Red stripes	Blue / Red hoops	MLS, February 26, 2022 against Toronto FC
Primary Alternate	Red / Blue hoops	White / Blue stripes	White / Blue hoops	MLS, August 2, 2022 against Seattle Sounders FC
Secondary	Powder Blue	White / Blue stripes	White / Blue hoops	MLS, March 5, 2022 against New England Revolution
Primeblue	White	White / Pink stripes	White / Pink hoops	MLS, May 28, 2022 against Orlando City SC
