= Riacho de Santana =

Riacho de Santana may refer to the following places in Brazil:

- Riacho de Santana, Bahia
- Riacho de Santana, Rio Grande do Norte
