= Liam Fraser =

Canadian soccer player (born 1998)

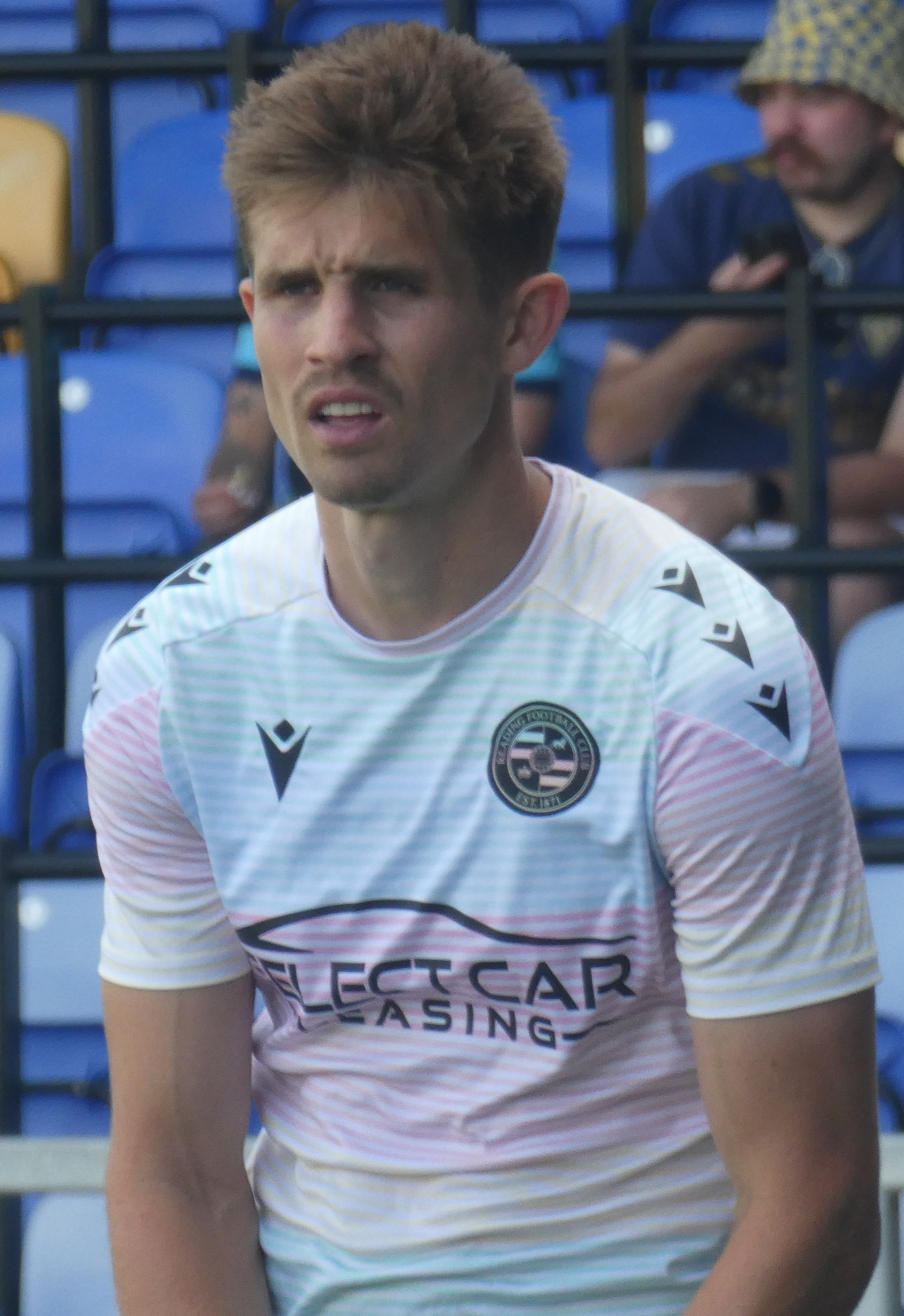
- Fraser playing for Reading in 2026

Personal information
- Full name: Liam Scott Fraser
- Date of birth: February 13, 1998 (age 28)
- Place of birth: Toronto, Ontario, Canada
- Height: 1.85 m (6 ft 1 in)
- Position: Central midfielder

Team information
- Current team: Reading
- Number: 6

Youth career
- Waterloo United
- Peace Arch AC
- Surrey Guildford
- Vancouver Whitecaps FC
- 2013–2016: Toronto FC

Senior career*
Years	Team	Apps	(Gls)
2015	Toronto FC III	8	(1)
2015–2019	Toronto FC II	64	(2)
2018–2021	Toronto FC	34	(0)
2021	→ Columbus Crew (loan)	23	(0)
2022–2023	Deinze	36	(0)
2023–2024	FC Dallas	25	(1)
2025	Crawley Town	16	(0)
2025–	Reading	38	(1)

International career^{‡}
2016–2017	Canada U20	8	(1)
2019–	Canada	19	(0)
- * Club domestic league appearances and goals as of November 14, 2026 ‡ National team caps and goals as of July 9, 2023

Liam Scott Fraser (born February 13, 1998) is a Canadian professional soccer player who plays as a central midfielder for EFL League One club Reading and the Canada national team. He began his career with Toronto FC, signing as a homegrown player in 2018.

== Club career ==
=== Early career ===
He began playing youth soccer with Waterloo United, Peach Arch AC, and Surrey Guildford.

Fraser was part of the Vancouver Whitecaps FC Residency program until January 2013, when he moved to Toronto FC. Fraser was critical of the Whitecaps organization and cited a lack of opportunity as the main reason for his switch.

He represented TFC Academy in both League1 Ontario and the Premier Development League in 2015.

=== Toronto FC II ===
In 2015, Fraser was later called up to represent affiliate club Toronto FC II, and went on to make 10 appearances during the 2015 USL season. On June 6, 2015, Fraser made his professional debut in a 0–0 draw with Harrisburg City Islanders.

He signed his first professional contract on February 9, 2016, when he joined Toronto FC II on a permanent basis ahead of the 2016 USL season. In 2017, amongst rumours that he would sign a first team deal with Toronto FC, Fraser was listed #15 in the USL's annual 20 Under 20 list. During the 2017 offseason, Fraser would train with Danish club HB Køge. Upon completion of the 2017 season, Toronto FC II would exercise the option on Fraser's contract for the 2018 season.

=== Toronto FC ===
He signed with Toronto FC as a homegrown player on January 19, 2018. On April 14, 2018, Fraser made his debut for the first team, in a Major League Soccer game against the Colorado Rapids. Fraser would have his option for the 2020 season exercised by Toronto, keeping him with the club for 2020.

On May 3, 2021, Fraser was loaned to fellow MLS side Columbus Crew SC for the remainder of the 2021 season, with Toronto receiving $50,000 of General Allocation Money.

=== Deinze ===
In January 2022, Fraser joined Belgian First Division B side Deinze on a two-and-a-half-year deal. He made his debut for the club on February 9 against Westerlo.

=== Dallas ===
In August 2023, Fraser transferred to Major League Soccer club FC Dallas. He made his debut for the club on August 30 against St. Louis City SC, as a substitute for Paxton Pomykal. In November 2023 FC Dallas announced they had exercised Fraser's contract option, keeping him at the club. Fraser's contract was not renewed at the end of the 2024 season.

=== Crawley Town ===
On 3 February 2025, Fraser signed for EFL League One club Crawley Town.

=== Reading ===
On 23 July 2025, Fraser returned to League One following Crawley Town's relegation, joining Reading on a two-year deal.

== International career ==
=== Youth ===
Fraser was called up to the Under-20 Development Camp squad in Ontario in September 2015, but did not feature under coach Rob Gale. He was then called up for the Under-20 International Camp squad in England in March 2016, but again failed to make his international debut. In August 2016, Fraser was called up to the U-20 team for a pair of friendlies against Costa Rica In February 2017, Fraser was named to Canada's roster for the 2017 CONCACAF U-20 Championship

Fraser was named to the Canadian U-23 provisional roster for the 2020 CONCACAF Men's Olympic Qualifying Championship on February 26, 2020.

=== Senior ===
After multiple camp call-ups in 2018 and 2019, Fraser made his debut for the Canadian senior team on October 15, 2019, as a substitute in a 2–0 win against the USA. In July 2021 Fraser was named to Canada's squad for the 2021 CONCACAF Gold Cup.

In November 2022, Fraser was named to Canada's squad for the 2022 FIFA World Cup. He did not make an appearance at the tournament as Canada was eliminated in the group stage.

In June 2023 Fraser was named to Canada's preliminary roster for the 2023 CONCACAF Gold Cup. Initially left off the roster, on June 26 he was called into the final squad along with Jayden Nelson as replacements for Sam Adekugbe and Stephen Eustáquio.

== Career statistics ==
As of match played November 14, 2026

Appearances and goals by club, season and competition
Club	Season	League			National cup (Note: Appearance(s) in the U.S. Open Cup, Belgian Cup and FA Cup)		League cup (Note: Appearance(s) in the Leagues Cup and EFL Cup)		Continental		Other		Total	
Club	Season	Division	Apps	Goals	Apps	Goals	Apps	Goals	Apps	Goals	Apps	Goals	Apps	Goals
Toronto FC III	2015	League1 Ontario	?	?	—		—		—		—		?	?
Toronto FC III	2015	PDL	8	1	—		—		—		—		8	1
Toronto FC III	Total		8	1	—		—		—		—		8	1
Toronto FC II	2015	USL	10	0	—		—		—		—		10	0
Toronto FC II	2016	USL	22	2	—		—		—		—		22	2
Toronto FC II	2017	USL	20	0	—		—		—		—		20	0
Toronto FC II	2018	USL	10	0	—		—		—		—		10	0
Toronto FC II	2019	USL League One	2	0	—		—		—		—		2	0
Toronto FC II	Total		64	2	—		—		—		—		64	2
Toronto FC	2018	MLS	10	0	0	0	2	0	—		—		12	0
Toronto FC	2019	MLS	9	0	0	0	2	0	—		—		11	0
Toronto FC	2020	MLS	13	0	0	0	0	0	—		1 (Note: Appearance(s) in the MLS Cup playoffs)	0	14	0
Toronto FC	2021	MLS	1	0	0	0	0	0	1 (Note: Appearance(s) in the CONCACAF Champions Cup)	0	—		2	0
Toronto FC	Total		33	0	0	0	4	0	1	0	1	0	39	0
Columbus Crew (loan)	2021	MLS	23	0	0	0	—		1 (Note: Appearance(s) in the Campeones Cup)	0	—		24	0
Deinze	2021–22	Challenger Pro League	10	0	0	0	—		—		—		10	0
Deinze	2022–23	Challenger Pro League	26	0	1	0	—		—		—		27	1
Deinze	Total		36	0	1	0	—		—		—		37	0
FC Dallas	2023	MLS	7	0	0	0	0	0	—		3	0	10	0
FC Dallas	2024	MLS	18	1	1	0	0	0	—		—		19	1
FC Dallas	Total		25	1	1	0	0	0	—		3	0	29	0
Crawley Town	2024–25	EFL League One	16	0	0	0	0	0	—		0 (Note: Appearance(s) in EFL Trophy)	0	16	0
Reading	2025–26	EFL League One	33	1	0	0	3	1	—		1	0	37	2
Reading	2026–27	EFL League One	5	0	1	0	3	0	—		2	1	11	1
Reading	Total		38	1	`	0	6	1	0	0	3	1	48	3
Career total			243	5	3	0	9	1	2	0	8	4	266	7

== Honours ==
=== Club ===
Columbus Crew

- Campeones Cup: 2021
