= Geovane Jesus =

Brazilian footballer (born 2001)

Personal information
- Full name: Geovane de Jesus Rocha
- Date of birth: 31 July 2001 (age 25)
- Place of birth: Riacho de Santana, Bahia
- Height: 1.80 m (5 ft 11 in)
- Position: Defender

Youth career
- –2020: Palmeiras
- 2020–2021: Cruzeiro

Senior career*
Years	Team	Apps	(Gls)
2021–2022	Cruzeiro	27	(2)
2023–2026	FC Dallas	19	(0)
- * Club domestic league appearances and goals as of 15:35, 29 December 2025 (UTC)

Geovane de Jesus Rocha (born 31 July 2001) is a Brazilian footballer who last played for MLS side FC Dallas as a defender.

== Career ==
=== Debut for Cruzeiro ===
From Riacho de Santana, Bahia he played in the youth teams of Palmeiras before joining Cruzeiro in 2020. On 25 April 2021 he made his professional debut for Cruzeiro in the Campeonato Mineiro against Clube Atlético Patrocinense. In March 2022 Jesus signed a new contract with Cruzeiro taking him to 2025 with the club. Jesus made his Campeonato Brasileiro Série B league debut on 27 April 2022 in a 1–0 win for Cruzeiro against Londrina Esporte Clube. Just a few days later he scored his first league goal on 30 April 2022 against Chapecoense.

=== Serie B title ===
Jesus played 27 times in the league and 40 times across all competitions as Cruzeiro won the Brazilian Série B title and gained promotion to Série A during the 2022 season. He was predominantly used at right-back. He scored in what would become his final match for Cruzeiro on 6 November 2022 as Cruzeiro won 3–2 against CSA to crown their promotion and relegate their opponents.

=== FC Dallas ===
In December 2022 it was confirmed the player would take an international roster slot for FC Dallas of MLS, signing a contract through 2026 with an option for a further year. He made his MLS debut on February 26, 2023 against Minnesota United FC. Jesus missed the entire 2024 season recovering from a torn ACL. It was announced on February 26, 2025 that he would also miss the entire 2025 season following a second surgery to his injured knee.

== Career statistics ==
=== Club ===
As of match played 3 September 2024

Appearances and goals by club, season and competition
Club	Season	League			State League		National cup		Continental		Total	
Club	Season	Division	Apps	Goals	Apps	Goals	Apps	Goals	Apps	Goals	Apps	Goals
Cruzeiro	2021	Série B	0	0	1 (Note: Appearance(s) in Campeonato Mineiro)	0	0	0	—		1	0
Cruzeiro	2022	Série B	27	2	9	0	3	0	—		39	2
Cruzeiro	Total		27	2	10	0	3	0	—		40	2
FC Dallas	2023	MLS	19	0	—		1	0	4 (Note: Appearance(s) in Leagues Cup)	0	24	0
FC Dallas	2024	MLS	0	0	—		0	0	0	0	0	0
FC Dallas	Total		19	0	—		1	0	4	0	24	0
Career Total			46	2	10	0	4	0	4	0	64	2

== Honours ==
=== Club ===
Cruzeiro

- Série B: 2022
- Campeonato Mineiro 2022 Runner-up
