= José Martínez (footballer, born 1993) =

Spanish footballer

Personal information
- Full name: José Antonio Marínez Gil
- Date of birth: 12 February 1993 (age 33)
- Place of birth: La Palma del Condado, Spain
- Height: 1.89 m (6 ft 2 in)
- Position: Centre back

Youth career
- 2007–2011: Siempre Alegres
- 2011–2012: Nervión

Senior career*
Years	Team	Apps	(Gls)
2012–2013	Cerro Águila		
2013–2014	Alcalá	20	(1)
2014–2016	Sevilla B	44	(1)
2016–2018	Barcelona B	55	(2)
2018–2020	Eibar	0	(0)
2018–2020	→ Granada (loan)	56	(1)
2021–2023	FC Dallas	72	(1)
2024–2025	Córdoba	20	(1)
2025	Yunnan Yukun	11	(0)
- * Club domestic league appearances and goals as of 21 December 2024

José Antonio Martínez Gil (born 12 February 1993) is a Spanish retired professional footballer who played as a central defender. Besides Spain, he has played in the United States.

== Club career ==
Born in La Palma del Condado, Huelva, Andalusia, Martínez finished his formation with AD Nervión. In 2012 he moved to AD Cerro del Águila, making his senior debut during the campaign, in the regional leagues.

In July 2013, Martínez joined Tercera División side CD Alcalá. On 24 January of the following year, after being an undisputed starter, he signed for Sevilla FC and was initially assigned to the reserves in Segunda División B.

On 27 June 2016, after achieving promotion to Segunda División, Martínez agreed to a contract with another reserve team, FC Barcelona B also in the third division. A first-choice, he contributed with 34 appearances and one goal as his side returned to the second division after a two-year absence.

Martínez made his professional debut on 19 August 2017, starting in a 2–1 away win against Real Valladolid. The following 1 July, he signed a three-year contract with La Liga side SD Eibar, but was loaned to Granada CF in the second division late in the month.

On 10 August 2019, after achieving promotion with the Nazaríes, Martinez's loan was renewed for a further year. He made his debut in the top tier on 1 September, playing the last 14 minutes in a 3–0 away defeat of RCD Espanyol.

On 19 December 2020, it was announced that Martínez would join Major League Soccer side FC Dallas ahead of their 2021 season. He was released by the club on 30 November 2023, after the option for an extension was declined.

On 31 January 2024, Martínez signed an 18-month deal with Primera Federación side Córdoba CF. He helped in the club's promotion to the second division before terminating his link on 20 January 2025.

On 24 January 2025, Martínez signed Chinese Super League club Yunnan Yukun.

== Career statistics ==
=== Club ===
As of match played 14 June 2025

Appearances and goals by club, season and competition
Club	Season	League			National Cup		Continental		Other		Total	
Club	Season	Division	Apps	Goals	Apps	Goals	Apps	Goals	Apps	Goals	Apps	Goals
Alcalá	2013–14	Tercera División	20	1	—		—		—		20	1
Sevilla B	2013–14	Segunda División B	7	0	—		—		—		7	0
Sevilla B	2014–15	Segunda División B	12	0	—		—		—		12	0
Sevilla B	2015–16	Segunda División B	25	1	—		—		6 (Note: Appearance(s) in Segunda División B Playoffs)	0	31	1
Sevilla B	Total		44	1	—		—		6	0	50	1
Barcelona B	2016–17	Segunda División B	33	1	—		—		1	0	34	1
Barcelona B	2017–18	Segunda División	22	1	—		—		—		22	1
Barcelona B	Total		55	2	—		—		1	0	56	2
Eibar	2020–21	La Liga	0	0	0	0	—		—		0	0
Granada (loan)	2018–19	Segunda División	36	1	1	0	—		—		37	1
Granada (loan)	2019–20	La Liga	20	0	3	0	—		—		23	0
Granada (loan)	Total		56	1	4	0	—		—		60	1
FC Dallas	2021	MLS	19	0	0	0	—		—		19	0
FC Dallas	2022	MLS	31	0	1	0	—		2	0	34	0
FC Dallas	2023	MLS	22	1	0	0	4	0	0	0	26	1
FC Dallas	Total		72	1	1	0	4	0	2	0	79	1
Córdoba	2023–24	Primera Federación	8	0	0	0	—		0	0	8	0
Córdoba	2024–25	Segunda División	12	1	1	0	—		—		13	1
Córdoba	Total		20	1	1	0	—		0	0	21	1
Yunnan Yukun	2025	Chinese Super League	11	0	0	0	—		—		11	0
Career total			278	6	6	0	4	0	9	0	297	6
