= Nanu (footballer) =

Footballer (born 1994)

Personal information
- Full name: Eulânio Ângelo Chipela Gomes
- Date of birth: 17 May 1994 (age 32)
- Place of birth: Coimbra, Portugal
- Height: 1.77 m (5 ft 10 in)
- Position: Right-back

Team information
- Current team: Iraklis
- Number: 31

Youth career
- 2003–2006: Taboeira
- 2006–2007: Benfica
- 2007–2011: Taboeira
- 2011–2013: Beira-Mar

Senior career*
Years	Team	Apps	(Gls)
2013–2015	Beira-Mar	10	(0)
2014–2015	→ Gafanha (loan)	26	(3)
2015–2018	Marítimo B	71	(4)
2018–2020	Marítimo	44	(2)
2020–2023	Porto	12	(1)
2021	Porto B	1	(0)
2022	→ FC Dallas (loan)	29	(0)
2023	→ Santa Clara (loan)	11	(0)
2023–2025	Samsunspor	6	(0)
2024	→ Estrela Amadora (loan)	12	(0)
2025–2026	APOEL	35	(0)
2026–	Iraklis	9	(2)

International career^{‡}
2019–	Guinea-Bissau	33	(0)
- * Club domestic league appearances and goals as of 3 November 2026 ‡ National team caps and goals as of 8 October 2025

Eulânio Ângelo Chipela Gomes (born 17 May 1994) known as Nanu, is a professional footballer who plays as a right-back for Iraklis. Born in Portugal, he represents the Guinea-Bissau national team.

== Club career ==
On 27 July 2013, Nanu made his professional debut with Beira-Mar in a 2013–14 Taça da Liga match against Portimonense, replacing Tiago Cintra (80th minute). In the first match of the 2013–14 Segunda Liga season against FC Porto B on the 12 August, he made his league debut.

On 5 October 2020, Nanu was announced at FC Porto on a five year contract.

On 10 January 2022, Nanu moved on a season-long loan to Major League Soccer club FC Dallas. Following the 2022 season, Nanu's contract option was declined by Dallas.

On 31 January 2023, Nanu was sent on loan to Santa Clara for the remainder of the 2022-23 season.

On 11 July 2023, recently promoted Süper Lig club Samsunspor announced the signing of Nanu on a two-year contract, with an option for a third year. Porto, who had terminated Nanu's contract by mutual consent, kept 15% of the player's economic rights.

On 31 January 2024, Nanu returned to Portugal, loaned to Primeira Liga side Estrela de Amadora until the end of the 2023–24 season.

On 18 August 2025, APOEL announced the signing of Nanu on a contract running until the summer of 2026.

== International career ==
Nanu made his Guinea-Bissau national team debut on 8 June 2019 in a friendly against Angola, as a starter. He represented the national team at the 2019 Africa Cup of Nations.

On 30 December 2021, Nanu was called up to the 24-player Guinea-Bissau squad for the 2021 Africa Cup of Nations.

On 5 January 2024, Nanu was called up to the 27-player Guinea-Bissau squad for the 2023 Africa Cup of Nations.

== Career statistics ==
=== Club ===
As of match played 14 May 2023

Appearances and goals by club, season and competition
Club	Season	League			National Cup (Note: Includes Taça de Portugal and U.S. Open Cup)		League Cup (Note: Includes Taça da Liga)		Continental		Other		Total	
Club	Season	Division	Apps	Goals	Apps	Goals	Apps	Goals	Apps	Goals	Apps	Goals	Apps	Goals
Beira-Mar	2013–14	Segunda Liga	9	0	2	0	6	0	—		—		17	0
Gafanha (loan)	2014–15	Campeonato Nacional de Seniores	26	2	—		—		—		—		26	2
Marítimo B	2015–16	Campeonato de Portugal	19	2	—		—		—		—		19	2
Marítimo B	2016–17	Campeonato de Portugal	18	0	—		—		—		—		18	0
Marítimo B	2017–18	Campeonato de Portugal	24	2	—		—		—		—		24	2
Marítimo B	2018–19	Campeonato de Portugal	10	0	—		—		—		—		10	0
Marítimo B	Total		71	4	—		—		—		—		71	4
Marítimo	2017–18	Primeira Liga	1	0	0	0	0	0	0	0	—		1	0
Marítimo	2018–19	Primeira Liga	15	0	0	0	2	0	—		—		17	0
Marítimo	2019–20	Primeira Liga	33	2	1	0	1	0	—		—		35	2
Marítimo	2020–21	Primeira Liga	3	1	0	0	0	0	—		—		3	1
Marítimo	Total		52	3	1	0	3	0	0	0	—		56	3
Porto B	2020–21	Liga Portugal 2	1	0	—		—		—		—		1	0
Porto	2020–21	Primeira Liga	12	0	1	0	2	0	4 (Note: Appearances in UEFA Champions League)	0	0	0	19	0
Porto	2021–22	Primeira Liga	0	0	0	0	2	0	0	0	–		2	0
Porto	Total		12	0	1	0	4	0	4	0	0	0	21	0
FC Dallas (loan)	2022	Major League Soccer	27	0	1	0	—		—		2 (Note: Appearances in MLS Cup Playoffs)	0	30	0
Santa Clara (loan)	2022–23	Primeira Liga	11	0	0	0	0	0	—		—		11	0
Career total			209	9	5	0	13	0	4	0	2	0	233	9

=== International goals ===
Scores and results list Guinea-Bissau's goal tally first.

No.	Date	Venue	Opponent	Score	Result	Competition
1.	4 September 2019	Estádio Nacional 12 de Julho, São Tomé, São Tomé and Príncipe	São Tomé and Príncipe	1–0	1–0	2022 FIFA World Cup qualification
