= Tsiki Ntsabeleng =

South African footballer (born 1998)

Personal information
- Full name: Katlego Ntsabeleng
- Date of birth: 9 February 1998 (age 28)
- Place of birth: Daveyton, South Africa
- Height: 1.70 m (5 ft 7 in)
- Positions: Midfielder; winger

Team information
- Current team: Mamelodi Sundowns (on loan from FC Dallas)
- Number: 34

Youth career
- Stars of Africa
- Kaizer Chiefs
- Mamelodi Sundowns
- University of Johannesburg

College career
Years	Team	Apps	(Gls)
2018–2019	Coastal Carolina Chanticleers	28	(9)
2020–2021	Oregon State Beavers	25	(6)

Senior career*
Years	Team	Apps	(Gls)
2019	Reading United	5	(0)
2022–	FC Dallas	79	(2)
2025–	→ Mamelodi Sundowns (loan)	2	(0)

International career^{‡}
2017	South Africa U20	4	(0)
- * Club domestic league appearances and goals as of 3 January 2026 ‡ National team caps and goals as of 01:05, 27 February 2022 (UTC)

Katlego "Tsiki" Ntsabeleng (born 9 February 1998) is a South African soccer player who plays for Mamelodi Sundowns, after a transfer from FC Dallas in Major League Soccer.

== Career ==
=== Youth and college ===
Born in Daveyton in South Africa, Ntsabeleng spent time with various clubs in South Africa including the Stars of Africa Academy team, which he joined in 2014. Ntsabeleng also appeared for the reserve teams of Kaizer Chiefs and Mamelodi Sundowns, before attending the University of Johannesburg, where he also played soccer.

In 2018, Ntsabeleng moved to the United States to play college soccer at Coastal Carolina University. In two seasons with the Chanticleers, he made 28 appearances, scoring nine goals and tallying eight assists. In his junior season, he earned All-Sun Belt First Team, Sun Belt Championship All-Tournament Team, United Soccer Coaches All-Southeast Region, and the Sun Belt's Newcomer of the Year. In 2019, he was again named Sun Belt First Team All-Conference.

After earning his degree, Ntsabeleng enrolled in a graduate program at Oregon State University where he played seasons with the Beavers, netting six goals and tallying ten assists in 25 appearances. He was named All-Pac-12 First Team and All-Far West Region First Team in his senior season.

While at college, Ntsabeleng played with USL League Two side Reading United during their 2019 season. He made five appearances for the team, finishing with a single assist to his name.

=== Professional ===
On 11 January 2022, Ntsabeleng was selected 28th overall in the 2022 MLS SuperDraft by FC Dallas. On 11 February 2022, he signed a one-year deal with the club. Dallas head coach Nico Estevez cited Ntsabeleng's dynamism and dribbling: “He's very dynamic type of player. Really good energy. He plays with good tempo... and then his ability to be balanced with the ball while dribbling makes him a special player. And that’s what we saw before the draft. And this is what we're seeing so far in preseason. I think he's progressing in the right way. And he has earned his spot with us.” Estevez began converting Ntsabeleng into a box-to-box midfielder in his 4-3-3 system, with Ntsabeleng playing a similar role as Paxton Pomykal and Brandon Servania.

He made his professional debut on 26 February 2022, appearing as a 77th-minute substitute during a 1–1 draw with Toronto FC. Ntsabeleng scored his first FC Dallas goal on 23 April 2022 vs Houston Dynamo, an 87th minute equalizer after appearing as a substitute in a come from behind 2–1 victory for FCD. His first MLS start came as a midfielder in a 2–2 draw against Sporting Kansas City on April 30 at Children's Mercy Park.
