= Joshué Quiñónez =

Ecuadorian footballer (born 2001)

Personal information
- Full name: Joshué Jampier Quiñónez Rodriguez
- Date of birth: 29 May 2001 (age 25)
- Place of birth: Guayaquil, Ecuador
- Height: 5 ft 11 in (1.80 m)
- Position: Defender

Team information
- Current team: C.D. Universidad Católica del Ecuador

Youth career
- –2019: Barcelona

Senior career*
Years	Team	Apps	(Gls)
2019–	Barcelona SC	8	(0)
2022	→ FC Dallas (loan)	7	(0)
2024–	→ Universidad Católica (loan)	0	(0)

International career^{‡}
2021–	Ecuador	1	(0)
- * Club domestic league appearances and goals as of 15 October 2022 ‡ National team caps and goals as of 10 November 2021

Joshué Quiñónez (born 29 May 2001) is an Ecuadorian professional footballer who plays as a defender for C.D. Universidad Católica del Ecuador on loan from Barcelona SC.

== Club career ==
In December 2021, Barcelona SC extended his contract.

In March 2022, FC Dallas acquired Quiñónez on loan. Quiñónez made his FC Dallas debut on 19 April 2022 against FC Tulsa.

== International career ==
In October 2021, Quiñónez made his international debut for the Ecuador national team.
