= Riacho de Santana, Bahia =

Coordinates: 13°36′32″S 42°56′20″W

- Municipality
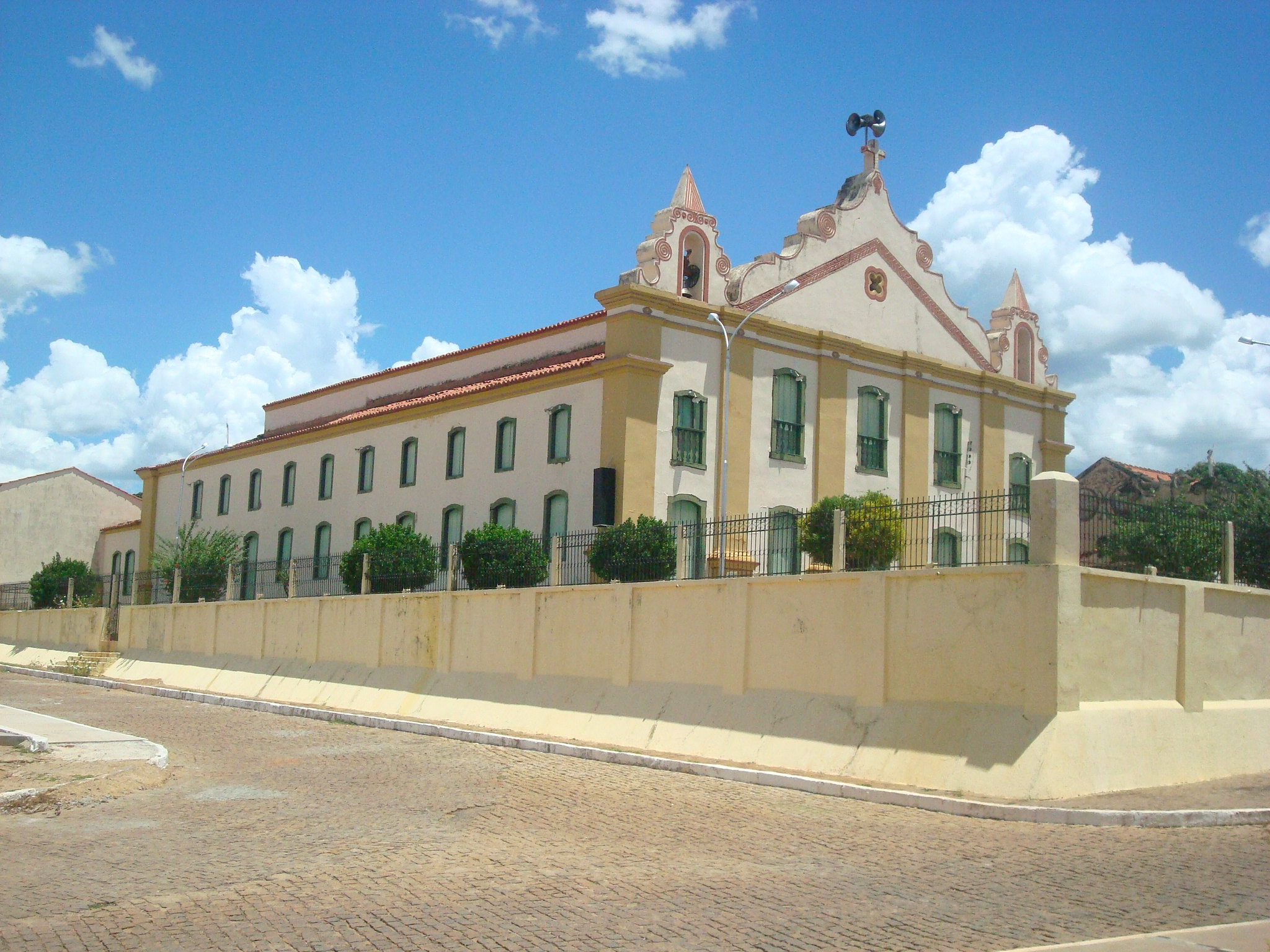

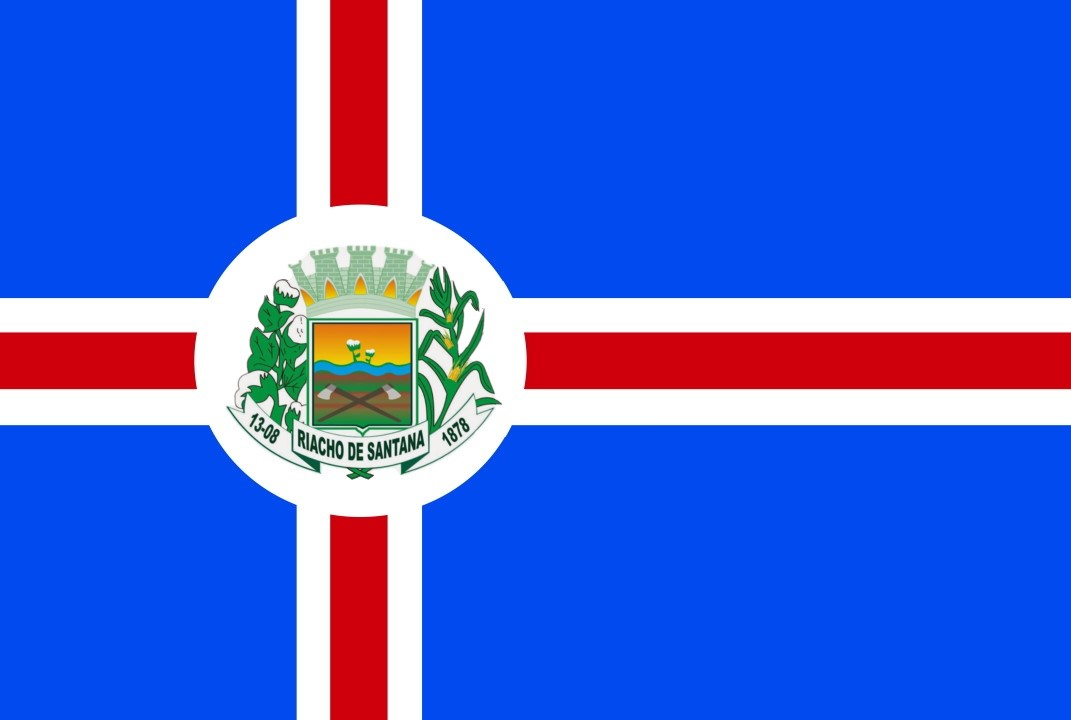
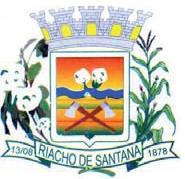
- Flag Coat of arms
- Interactive map of Riacho de Santana, Bahia
- Country: Brazil
- Region: Nordeste
- State: Bahia

Population (2020)
  - Total: 35,593
- Time zone: UTC−3 (BRT)

Riacho de Santana is a municipality in the state of Bahia in the North-East region of Brazil.

== See also ==
- List of municipalities in Bahia
