= Nkosi Tafari =

American soccer player (born 1997)

- Tafari with Los Angeles FC in 2026

Personal information
- Full name: Nkosi Tafari Burgess
- Date of birth: March 23, 1997 (age 29)
- Place of birth: New York City, U.S.
- Height: 6 ft 4 in (1.93 m)
- Position: Defender

Team information
- Current team: Los Angeles FC
- Number: 91

College career
Years	Team	Apps	(Gls)
2015–2018	UConn Huskies	46	(1)
2019	Seattle Redhawks	20	(1)

Senior career*
Years	Team	Apps	(Gls)
2020–2025	FC Dallas	107	(7)
2020–2021	→ North Texas SC (loan)	8	(2)
2025–	Los Angeles FC	52	(0)
- * Club domestic league appearances and goals as of October 21, 2026

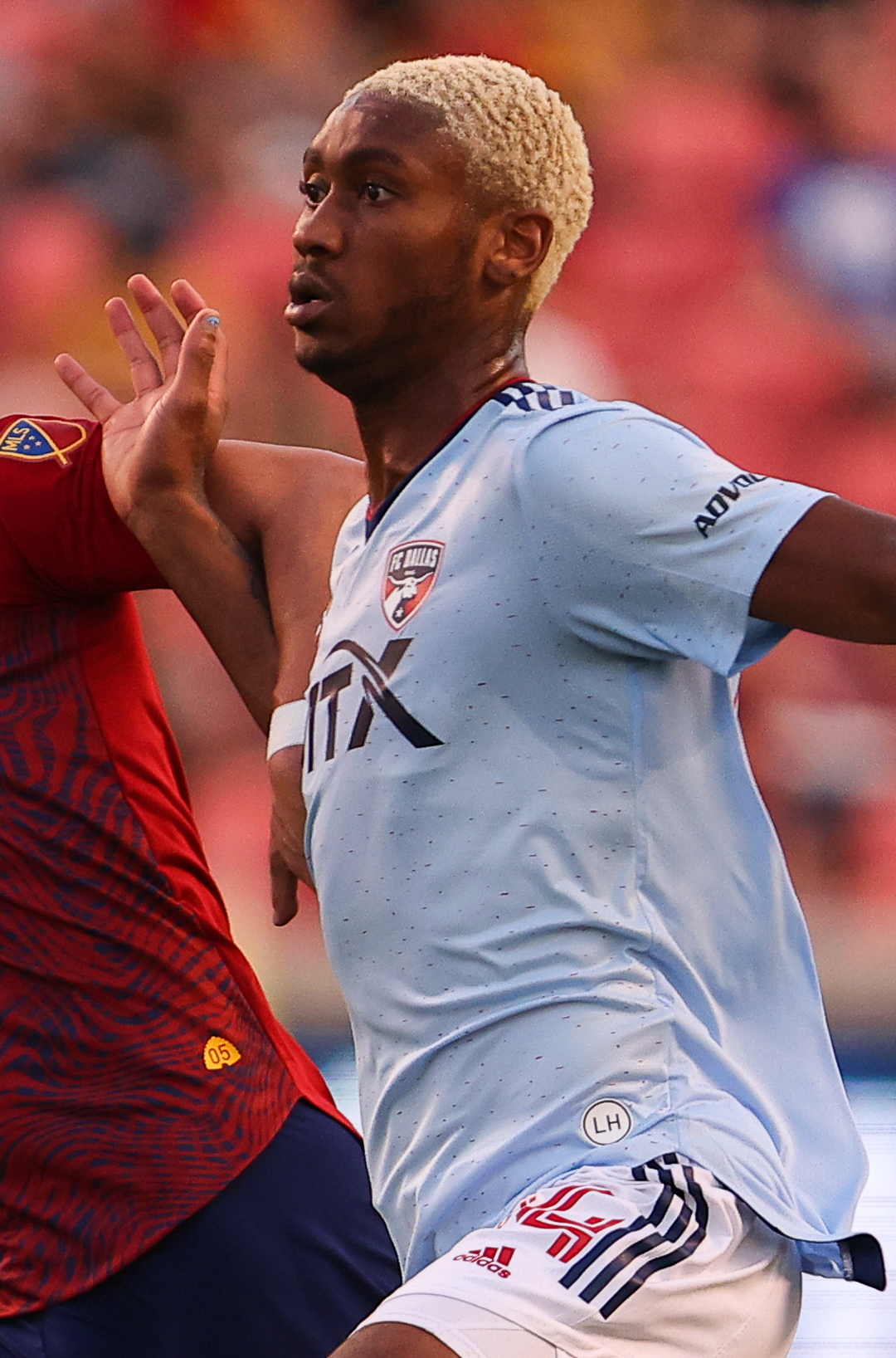
Tafari with FC Dallas in 2021

Nkosi Tafari Burgess (born March 23, 1997) is an American professional soccer player who plays as a defender for Major League Soccer club Los Angeles FC.

== Club career ==
=== College ===
Tafari began playing college soccer at the University of Connecticut in 2015. He redshirted his Freshman season, before going on to make 46 appearances for the Huskies, scoring 1 goal and tallying 1 assist between 2016 and 2018. In 2019, Tafari played his senior season at Seattle University, making 20 appearances and again tallying a single goal and an assist on his way to be named WAC Defensive Player of the Year and United Soccer Coaches All-Region First Team.

=== Professional ===
On January 9, 2020, Tafari was selected 14th overall in the 2020 MLS SuperDraft by FC Dallas. He signed with the club on February 18, 2020.

He made his professional debut on October 3, 2020, starting for Dallas' USL League One affiliate side North Texas SC in a fixture against Fort Lauderdale CF.

He scored his first professional goal with FC Dallas on August 21, 2021, against the Houston Dynamo. On August 26, 2023, Tafari scored the game-winning goal in a 1–0 game against rivals . The goal came at 96:49 the latest game-winning goal in club history.

On January 23, 2025, Tafari was traded to Los Angeles FC in exchange for $300,000 in General Allocation Money and an International Roster Slot.

== International career ==
In January 2024 he was selected for the senior United States squad for a friendly match against Slovenia. He is currently eligible to represent Ethiopia and USA.

== Personal life ==
In 2021, Tafari announced he would go by his middle name Tafari instead of Burgess, choosing to distance himself from the name that has been "passed down from master to slave" and saying "I want to get back to my own roots and be proud of being African". He is of mixed race Ethiopian and Malagasy descent through his mother.

== Career statistics ==
=== Club ===
As of match played 8 September 2024

Appearances and goals by club, season and competition
Club	Season	League			National cup		Continental		Total	
Club	Season	Division	Apps	Goals	Apps	Goals	Apps	Goals	Apps	Goals
FC Dallas	2020	MLS	0	0	—		—		0	0
FC Dallas	2021	MLS	22	1	—		—		22	1
FC Dallas	2022	MLS	27	0	2	0	—		29	0
FC Dallas	2023	MLS	33	3	0	0	4 (Note: Appearance(s) in Leagues Cup)	0	37	3
FC Dallas	2024	MLS	25	3	3	0	2	0	30	3
FC Dallas	Total		107	7	5	0	6	0	118	7
North Texas SC	2020	USL League One	6	1	—		—		6	1
North Texas SC	2021	USL League One	2	1	—		—		2	1
North Texas SC	Total		8	2	—		—		8	2
Career Total			115	9	5	0	6	0	126	9
