= Facundo Quignon =

Argentine footballer

Facundo Quignón
Personal information
- Full name: Facundo Tomás Quignón
- Date of birth: 2 May 1993 (age 33)
- Place of birth: Buenos Aires, Argentina
- Height: 1.78 m (5 ft 10 in)
- Position: Defensive midfielder

Team information
- Current team: Almirante Brown

Youth career
- ?–2013: River Plate
- 2013–2015: San Lorenzo

Senior career*
Years	Team	Apps	(Gls)
2014–2018	San Lorenzo	13	(1)
2016–2017	→ Newell's Old Boys (loan)	28	(1)
2018–2021	Lanús	57	(0)
2021–2023	FC Dallas	71	(2)
2024–2026	Belgrano	39	(1)
2026–	Almirante Brown	1	(0)

International career
2009	Argentina U17		
- * Club domestic league appearances and goals as of 19:01, 11 March 2026 (UTC)

Facundo Tomás Quignón (born 2 May 1993) is an Argentine professional footballer who plays as a midfielder for Almirante Brown.

== Club career ==
In June 2021, Quignón signed with FC Dallas on a two-and-a-half-year contract.

On 23 April 2022 Quignón scored his first MLS goal, against Houston Dynamo FC in a 2–1 FC Dallas win.

On 17 October 2022 he scored his first MLS playoff goal in a 2-1 FC Dallas victory against Minnesota United to help send them to the conference semifinals.

== International career ==
In October 2009, Quignón represented the Argentina national under-17 team at the 2009 FIFA U-17 World Cup.

== Honours ==
San Lorenzo

- Copa Libertadores: 2014
- Supercopa Argentina: 2015
