= Paxton Pomykal =

American soccer player (born 1999)

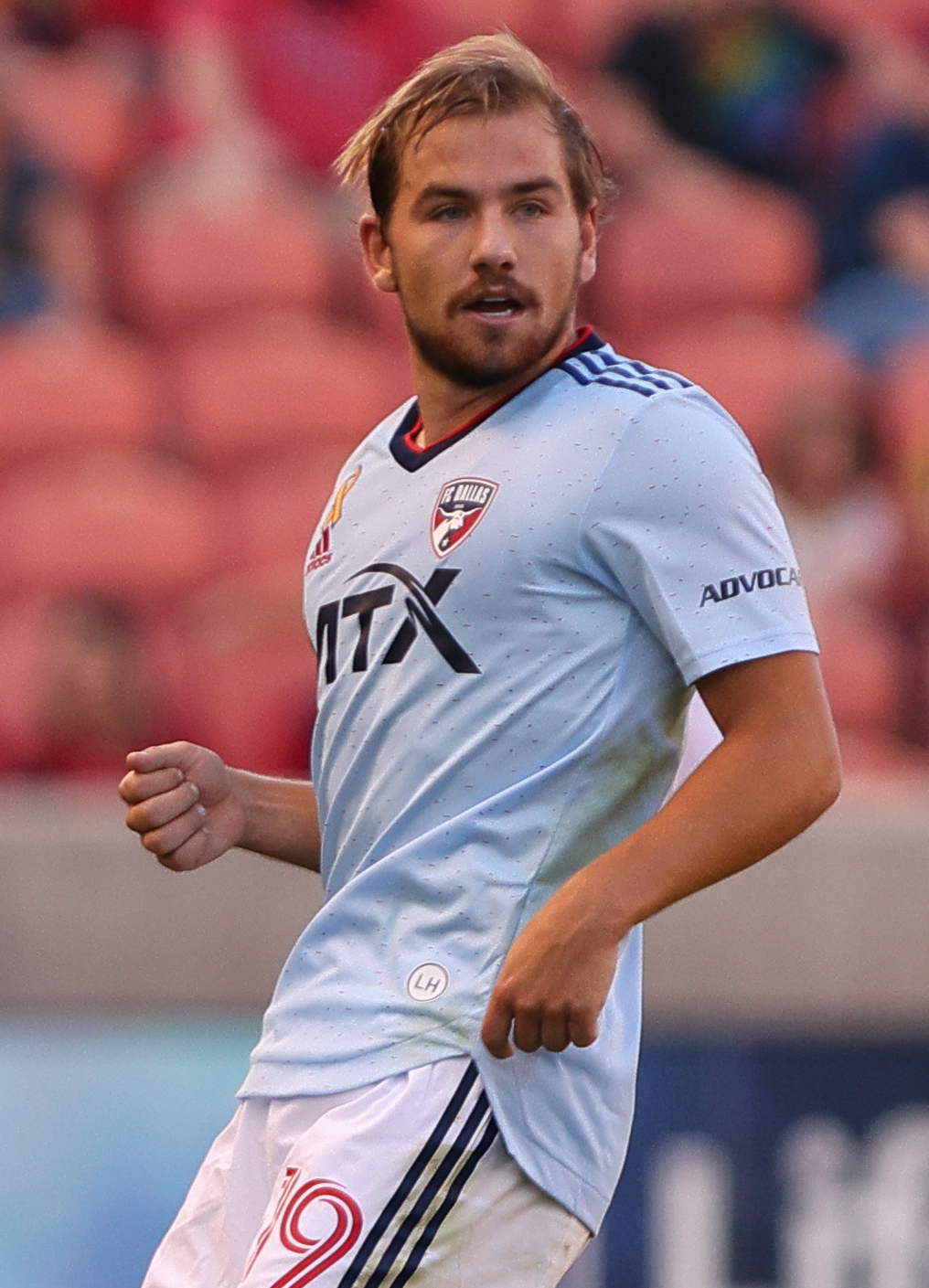
- Pomykal with FC Dallas in 2021

Personal information
- Full name: Paxton Jones Pomykal
- Date of birth: December 17, 1999 (age 26)
- Place of birth: Lewisville, Texas, United States
- Height: 5 ft 8 in (1.73 m)
- Position: Midfielder

Youth career
- 2010–2014: Dallas Texans
- 2014–2016: FC Dallas

Senior career*
Years	Team	Apps	(Gls)
2016–2026	FC Dallas	131	(4)

International career^{‡}
2016–2017	United States U18	13	(3)
2016	United States U19	1	(0)
2018–2019	United States U20	12	(3)
2019–2023	United States	3	(0)
- * Club domestic league appearances and goals as of February 19, 2026 ‡ National team caps and goals as of April 19, 2023

Paxton Jones Pomykal (born December 17, 1999) is an American professional soccer player who plays as a midfielder.

== Early life ==
Pomykal was born in Lewisville, Texas, on December 17, 1999. He attended iUniversity Prep, a Grapevine Colleyville ISD Virtual Academy in Grapevine, Texas. He also attended Marcus High School.

== Club career ==
=== Youth ===
Pomykal began his career with FC Dallas' youth academy, where he played with the team in the U.S. Development Academy. He was part of the FC Dallas' U-16 and U-18 teams that won National Youth Championships.

=== Professional ===
Pomykal signed a homegrown contract with FC Dallas on September 8, 2016. He made his professional debut on March 1, 2017, in a 2016–17 CONCACAF Champions League quarterfinal match against Árabe Unido. Pomykal came on in the 63rd minute for Kellyn Acosta. On Saturday, March 30 Pomykal scored his 1st and 2nd MLS goals against Salt Lake City. For his good form throughout the early part of the season, Pomykal was named to the 2019 MLS All Star game alongside club teammate Matt Hedges.

In the first game of the 2020 season, Pomykal scored the insurance goal in a 2–0 win over the Philadelphia Union. Injuries would take hold and Pomykal would only play in 5 games across 2020. Pomykal had a return to form in 2021, appearing in 31 games, starting 18. Pomykal scored one goal and assisted on two, he was named to the MLS team of the week for week 16. Pomykal built off his 2021 success with 35 appearances in 2022, starting in 31 games.

On February 19, 2026, Dallas opted to exercise a buyout of Pomykal's contract and he became a free agent.

== International career ==
He played for the United States U-18 team at the 2016 Vaclav Jezek Tournament. He consistently started for the US U20s at the 2019 FIFA U-20 World Cup in Poland.

Pomykal earned much praise through the 2019 MLS season that led to his first senior team call up in September. He made his first appearance for the USMNT on September 10, 2019, in an international friendly against Uruguay as a late substitute. Pomykal would also be called up and started for a friendly match against Serbia in 2023 which the United States lost 2–1. In April 2023, Pomykal was called up for the USMNT, replacing Paul Arriola who was injured. Pomykal received his third cap on April 19, 2023, in an international friendly against Mexico as a late substitute.

== Career statistics ==
=== Club ===
As of match played November 10, 2024

Appearances and goals by club, season and competition
Club	Season	League			National cup (Note: Includes U.S. Open Cup)		Playoffs		Continental (Note: Includes CONCACAF Champions Cup, Leagues Cup)		Total	
Club	Season	Division	Apps	Goals	Apps	Goals	Apps	Goals	Apps	Goals	Apps	Goals
FC Dallas	2016	MLS	0	0	—		—		—		0	0
FC Dallas	2017	MLS	2	0	2	0	—		1	0	5	0
FC Dallas	2018	MLS	6	0	1	0	—		—		7	0
FC Dallas	2019	MLS	25	2	1	0	1	0	—		27	2
FC Dallas	2020	MLS	5	1	—		—		—		5	1
FC Dallas	2021	MLS	31	1	—		—		—		31	1
FC Dallas	2022	MLS	33	0	—		2	0	—		35	0
FC Dallas	2023	MLS	24	0	1	0	3	0	3	0	31	0
FC Dallas	2024	MLS	1	0	—		—		—		1	0
FC Dallas	Total		127	4	5	0	6	0	4	0	142	4
Career total			127	4	5	0	6	0	4	0	142	4

=== International ===
As of match played April 19, 2023

Appearances and goals by national team and year
National team	Year	Apps	Goals
United States	2019	1	0
United States	2023	2	0
Total		3	0

== Honors ==
United States U20

- CONCACAF Under-20 Championship: 2018

Individual

- MLS All-Star: 2019
