= 2014 Sacramento Republic FC season =

Sacramento Republic FC
2014 season
- Owner: Warren Smith
- Head coach: Preki
- Stadium: Hughes Stadium (April 26 – June 20); Bonney Field (June 20 – Sep 6)
- USL Pro: 2nd
- USL Pro Playoffs: Champions
- U.S. Open Cup: 4th round
- Top goalscorer: Thomas Stewart (11)
- Highest home attendance: 20,231 (3 times; Hughes Stadium sellouts)
- Lowest home attendance: League: 8,000 (4 times; Bonney Field sellouts); All: 1,347 (May 14 v. Fresno at Cosumnes River College)
- Average home league attendance: League: 13,763; All: 10,495
Home colors	Away colors

The 2014 Sacramento Republic FC season was the club's inaugural season of existence. The club played in USL Pro, the third tier of the American soccer pyramid. The season began March 29 and concluded on September 6. The Republic won the USL Pro Championship, defeating the Harrisburg City Islanders 2–0.

== Background ==
On December 3, 2012, USL Pro announced that a Sacramento expansion team would join the league for the 2014 season. On July 15, 2013, Predrag "Preki" Radosavljević was announced as head coach of the new franchise. The official name of the team and team shield were decided by fan vote. On July 18, 2013, the franchise officially announced the team name Sacramento Republic FC during the first annual Sacramento Soccer Day.

While the club always had plans to build a permanent stadium for home matches, an agreement was made between the Republic and Sacramento City College which would allow the Republic to use Hughes Stadium as their home pitch until a permanent home could be established. On November 14, 2013, the club announced that they'd reached an agreement with Ovation Food Service and Cal Expo to build an 8,000 seat, soccer-specific stadium on the site of the California State Fair. Later, the club announced a naming deal with local Sacramento company Bonney Plumbing Heating and Air which would formally change the stadium's name to Bonney Field.

The 2014 USL Pro season started March 22, with the Republic playing its first match on March 29 away to LA Galaxy II, ending in a 1–1 draw. Their first home game wasn't until nearly a month later, when they took on Harrisburg City Islanders in a 2–1 loss at Hughes Stadium.

Throughout the course of the 2014 season, the Republic regularly hosted sold-out crowds. At their first home game, the Republic smashed the existing regular season single game attendance record (previously held by Orlando City FC and set on August 11, 2013, with a total of 10,697 in attendance) during their first home match with a total of 20,231 in attendance. The Republic would meet this figure, selling out the stadium, in all but one of their games at Hughes.

== Club ==
=== Roster ===
As of August 20, 2014. Note: Flags indicate national team as defined under FIFA eligibility rules; some limited exceptions apply. Players may hold more than one non-FIFA nationality.

No.	Pos.	Nation	Player
1	GK	NZL	Jake Gleeson (on loan from Portland Timbers)
3	DF	USA	Jack Avesyan
5	FW	USA	Chad Bartlomé (vice-captain)
7	MF	BRA	Gilberto
8	MF	MEX	Rodrigo López (vice-captain)
9	FW	USA	Dakota Collins
10	FW	NIR	Thomas Stewart
11	FW	USA	Max Alvarez
12	DF	MNE	Nemanja Vuković
13	DF	MEX	Christian Gonzalez
14	FW	USA	Adam Jahn (on loan from San Jose Earthquakes)
16	FW	USA	Tommy Thompson (on loan from San Jose Earthquakes)
17	FW	USA	Justin Braun (captain)

No.	Pos.	Nation	Player
18	MF	SRB	Ivan Mirkovic
19	MF	USA	Octavio Guzmán
20	MF	USA	Carlos Martinez
21	DF	USA	Mickey Daly
22	DF	AUS	Harrison Delbridge
23	DF	MNE	Emrah Klimenta
25	GK	USA	Dominik Jakubek
26	FW	LBR	Gabe Gissie
28	DF	USA	James Kiffe
29	MF	USA	Jeffrey "J.J." Koval (on loan from San Jose Earthquakes)
32	MF	USA	Steven Evans (on loan from Portland Timbers)
40	MF	USA	Agustin Cazarez
43	FW	BIH	Ismar "Izzy" Tandir

=== Technical staff ===
As of July 6, 2014.

Position	Name
Technical director	(England) Graham Smith
Head coach	(United States) Preki
Assistant coach	(United States) Rod Underwood
Assistant coach	(United States) Chris Malenab
Assistant coach	(United States) Antonio Sutton
Assistant coach/Goalkeepers	(England) Simon Sheppard
Assistant coach/Goalkeepers	(United States) Gene DuChateau
Team Administrator	(Republic of Ireland) Jason Corbally

== Competitions ==
=== Preseason ===
Practice match	California State University, Sacramento	0–6	Sacramento Republic	Sacramento, California
				Stadium: Hornet Stadium

February 28 Practice match	UC Santa Barbara Gauchos	1–6	Sacramento Republic	Santa Barbara, California
19:00 PST				Stadium: Rob Field

Practice match	Ventura County Fusion	3–2	Sacramento Republic	Ventura, California
				Stadium: Ventura College

March 5 Friendly	Sacramento Republic	0–2	San Jose Earthquakes	Turlock, California
19:00 PST	Daly (yellow card) 17'	Report	Pierazzi (yellow card) 39'; Goodson (yellow card) 65'; Sofia (yellow card) 83'; Koval 86'; Schuler 90+1'	Stadium: Warrior Field; Attendance: 1,105

March 15 Friendly	Sacramento Republic	2–1	Chico State Wildcats	Sacramento, California
13:00 PST				Stadium: Cosumnes River College

March 16 Friendly	UC Davis Aggies	1–0	Sacramento Republic	Davis, California
16:00 PST	Sheldon (yellow card) 41'; Quezada (yellow card) 45'; Hoeck 65'	Report	Mirković (red card); Delbridge (yellow card) 86'	Stadium: Aggie Soccer Field; Attendance: 1,375

March 19 Friendly	Sacramento Republic	0–0	Saint Mary's Gaels	Sacramento, California
16:00 PST				Stadium: Cosumnes River College

=== USL Pro ===
All times from this point on Pacific Daylight Saving Time (UTC−07:00)

March 29, 2014 1	LA Galaxy II	1–1	Sacramento Republic	Carson, California
19:30 PDT	Emory (yellow card) 40'; Hoffman 81'	Report	López (yellow card) 12'; Braun 33'; Alvarez (yellow card) 52'; Daly (yellow card) 82'	Stadium: StubHub Center Track & Field Stadium; Attendance: 1,085; Referee: Reed Christy

April 7, 2014 2	Chivas USA Reserves	1–3	Sacramento Republic	Carson, California
11:30 PDT	Moore 24'		Fucito 12'; Braun 25'; Stewart 90+'	Stadium: StubHub Center Track & Field Stadium

April 12, 2014 3	Orange County Blues FC	2–1	Sacramento Republic	Irvine, California
19:00 PDT	Russell 19' (pen.) (yellow card) 90'; J. Santana (yellow card) 25'; Okai (yellow card) 32' (goal) 70'	Report	Daly 8'; Vuković (yellow card) 18'; Mirković (yellow card) 28'; Delbridge (red card) 69'	Stadium: Anteater Stadium; Attendance: 638; Referee: Tyler Ploeger

April 13, 2014 4	LA Galaxy II	0–3	Sacramento Republic	Carson, California
15:00 PDT	Auras (yellow card) 19'; Courtois (yellow card) 38'	Report	Mirković (yellow card) 14'; Daly 33'; Alvarez (yellow card) 41' (goal) 45'; Collins 75'	Stadium: StubHub Center Track & Field Stadium; Attendance: 588; Referee: Baboucarr Jallow

April 19, 2014 5	Arizona United SC	2–1	Sacramento Republic	Peoria, Arizona
19:10 PDT	Top (yellow card) 16' (goal) 85'; Ruthven (yellow card) 27'; Swartzendruber 37'	Report	López 27'; Daly (yellow card) 45' (yellow-red card) 45'; Mirković (yellow card) 90'	Stadium: Peoria Sports Complex; Attendance: 3,014; Referee: Lucian Radoslovescu

April 26, 2014 6	Sacramento Republic	1–2	Harrisburg City Islanders	Sacramento, California
19:30 PDT	Jahn 32'; Alvarez (yellow card) 58'	Report	Derschang 5'; Langley (yellow card) 25' (goal) 52'; Bahner (yellow card) 42'	Stadium: Hughes Stadium; Attendance: 20,231; Referee: Alex Del Angel

May 3, 2014 7	Sacramento Republic	2–1	Orange County Blues FC	Sacramento, California
19:30 PDT	Stewart 42'; Fochive (yellow card) 65'; Jahn 70'	Report	Russell 48'; Turner (yellow card) 54'; McLain (yellow card) 71'	Stadium: Hughes Stadium; Attendance: 17,414; Referee: Michael Zapata

May 17, 2014 8	Sacramento Republic	2–1	LA Galaxy II	Sacramento, California
19:30 PDT	Stewart 7'; Lopez 67'; Daly (yellow card) 87'	Report	Venter 16'; Travis Bowen (yellow card) 25'; Garcia (red card) 51'; Diallo (yellow card) 67'	Stadium: Hughes Stadium; Attendance: 20,231; Referee: Nestor Chavez

May 23, 2014 9	Rochester Rhinos	0–1	Sacramento Republic	Rochester, New York
16:35 PDT		Report	Stewart 74'; Mirković (yellow card) 40'; López (yellow card) 67'	Stadium: Sahlen's Stadium; Referee: Chris Trottier

May 25, 2014 10	Dayton Dutch Lions	1–2	Sacramento Republic	West Carrollton, Ohio
16:00 PDT	Schoenfeld 44' (pen.); Harada (yellow card) 50'; Baiden (yellow card) 63'; Cruyff (yellow card) 90'	Report	Collins 13'; Delbridge (yellow card) 39'; Guzman 51'; Mirković (yellow card) 84'; López (yellow card) 90'	Stadium: DOC Stadium; Attendance: 527; Referee: Andreas Castel

June 7, 2014 11	Sacramento Republic	1–1	Arizona United SC	Sacramento, California
19:30 PDT	Fochive (yellow card) 43'; Delbridge (yellow card) 56'; Bartlomé 90+' (yellow card) 90+'	Report	Saint Cyr (yellow card) 45'; Woodberry 67'; Wallace (yellow card) 76'	Stadium: Hughes Stadium; Attendance: 20,231; Referee: Matthew Buckman

June 14, 2014 12	OKC Energy FC	2–0	Sacramento Republic	Oklahoma City, Oklahoma
17:00 PDT	Djeziri 36'; Lopez (yellow card) 48'; Thomas 81'; Howard (yellow card) 86'	Report	Fochive (yellow card) 41'; López (yellow card) 56'; Daly (yellow card) 73'; Evans (yellow card) 85'	Stadium: Pribil Stadium; Attendance: 4,010; Referee: Elvis Mahmutovic

June 20, 2014 13	Sacramento Republic	4–3	Colorado Rapids Reserves	Sacramento, California
19:30 PDT	Braun 20'; López 39',42'; Avesyan (yellow card) 79'; Fucito 84'	Report	Mwanga 14'; Eloundou (yellow card) 34'; Torres 50'; Eloundou 54'	Stadium: Bonney Field; Attendance: 8,000; Referee: Michael Zapata

June 26, 2014 14	Sacramento Republic	1–0	Arizona United SC	Sacramento, California
19:30 PDT	Klimenta 13'; Powell (yellow card) 35'; Bartlomé (red card) 74'; Alvarez (yellow card) 79'	Report	Saint Cyr (yellow card) 22' (yellow-red card) 58'	Stadium: Bonney Field; Attendance: 8,000; Referee: Katja Korovela

June 28, 2014 15	OKC Energy FC	2–0	Sacramento Republic	Oklahoma City, Oklahoma
17:00 PDT	Howard (yellow card) 35' (goal) 53'; Evans (yellow card) 56'; Lopez 67'	Report	Fochive (yellow card) 64'	Stadium: Pribil Stadium; Attendance: 3,643; Referee: Nima Saghafi

July 7, 2014 16	Sacramento Republic	2–1	Orange County Blues FC	Sacramento, California
19:30 PDT	Mirković (yellow card) 21'; López 32'; Jahn (yellow card) 50'; López (yellow card) 86'; Stewart (yellow card) 86'; Guzman 90+'	Report	Gonzalez 32'; McLain (yellow card) 86'; Russell (yellow card) 90'	Stadium: Bonney Field; Attendance: 8,000; Referee: Nestor Chavez

July 12, 2014 17	Richmond Kickers	2–1	Sacramento Republic	Richmond, Virginia
16:00 PDT	Seaton (yellow card) 34'; Delicâte 67'; Delicâte 79'	Report	Fochive (yellow card) 34'; Gilberto (yellow card) 35'; Mirković (yellow card) 45'; Jahn 64'; Guzmán (yellow card) 70'	Stadium: City Stadium; Attendance: 2,135; Referee: Esteban Rosano

July 14, 2014 18	Charlotte Eagles	0–1	Sacramento Republic	Charlotte, North Carolina
16:00 PDT	Guzman (yellow card) 45'; Sekyere (yellow card) 84'	Report	Stewart 10'	Stadium: Queens University Stadium; Attendance: 647; Referee: Dustin Thorne

July 17, 2014 19	Sacramento Republic	0–0	Orlando City SC	Sacramento, California
19:30 PDT	Guzmán (yellow card) 23'; Jahn (yellow card) 38'; Mirković (yellow card) 54'; Alvarez (red card) 79'; López (yellow card) 83'; Klimenta (yellow card) 90'	Report	Cerén (yellow card) 50'; Luke Boden (yellow card) 80'	Stadium: Bonney Field; Attendance: 8,000; Referee: Matthew Buckman

July 27, 2014 20	Sacramento Republic	5–0	Pittsburgh Riverhounds	Sacramento, California
17:30 PDT	Stewart 7' 33'; López 69' 85'; Jahn 84'	Report	Motagalvan (yellow card) 89'	Stadium: Bonney Field; Attendance: 8,000; Referee: (United States) Tyler Ploeger

August 2, 2014 21	Arizona United SC	1–2	Sacramento Republic	Peoria, Arizona
19:00 PDT	Tan (yellow card) 32'; DelPiccolo (yellow card) 42'; Top 64' (yellow card) 90'; Morrison (yellow card) 65'; Robinson (yellow card) 85'	Report	Koval 53'; Braun 78'; Guzman (yellow card) 82'	Stadium: Peoria Sports Complex; Attendance: 1,888; Referee: Daniel Radford

August 9, 2014 22	Sacramento Republic	2–1	OKC Energy FC	Sacramento, California
19:30 PDT	Jahn 16'; Hedrick 18' (o.g.); Mirković (yellow card) 36'; Daly (yellow card) 72'; Gleeson (yellow card) 80'	Report	Perry (yellow card) 51'	Stadium: Bonney Field; Attendance: 8,000; Referee: Joe Dickerson

August 17, 2014 23	Orange County Blues FC	1–6	Sacramento Republic	Irvine, California
19:30 PDT	Martinez (yellow card) 42'; Russell 48'	Report	Vuković 38' (yellow card) 38'; Daly 54'; Jahn 56'; Stewart 68' 73' 90'; Alvarez (yellow card) 70'; Matinez (yellow card) 82'	Stadium: Anteater Stadium; Attendance: 753; Referee: (United States) Adrian Gonzalez

August 20, 2014 24	Sacramento Republic	2–0	Wilmington Hammerheads FC	Sacramento, California
19:30 PDT	Braun 15'; López (yellow card) 37'; Klimenta 76'	Report	Nicholson (yellow card) 35'; Ruggles (yellow card) 77'; Godelman (yellow card) 90'	Stadium: Bonney Field; Attendance: 8,000; Referee: Alex Marquand-Willse

August 27, 2014 25	Sacramento Republic	3–1	Charleston Battery	Sacramento, California
19:30 PDT	López 12' 25'; Evans 82'	Report	Falvey 17'	Stadium: Bonney Field; Attendance: 8,000; Referee: Michael Zapata

August 30, 2014 26	Wilmington Hammerheads FC	0–0	Sacramento Republic	Wilmington, North Carolina
19:30 PDT	Ackley (yellow card) 39'; Nicholson (yellow card) 81'; Tomaselli (yellow card) 83'	Report		Stadium: Legion Stadium; Attendance: 2,405; Referee: Larry Stroud

September 4, 2014 27	Sacramento Republic	1–0	OKC Energy FC	Sacramento, California
19:30 PDT	López 49'; Vukovic (yellow card) 70'; Evans (yellow card) 70'	Report	Evans (yellow card) 17'	Stadium: Bonney Field; Attendance: 8,000; Referee: Ricardo Salazar

September 6, 2014 28	Sacramento Republic	1–2	LA Galaxy II	Sacramento, California
19:30 PDT	Klimenta (yellow card) 50'; Guzman (yellow card) 51'; Alvarez 69'; Collins (yellow card) 89'	Report	McBean 18' 59'; Villarreal (yellow card) 27'; Rugg (yellow card) 70'; Bli (yellow card) 82'; Covarrubias (yellow card) 90'	Stadium: Bonney Field; Attendance: 8,000; Referee: Alex del Angel Jr.

=== Results summary ===
Overall								Home						Away					
Pld	W	D	L	GF	GA	GD	Pts	W	D	L	GF	GA	GD	W	D	L	GF	GA	GD
28	17	4	7	49	28	+21	55	10	2	2	27	13	+14	7	2	5	22	15	+7

Source: Match reports

Round	1	2	3	4	5	6	7	8	9	10	11	12	13	14	15	16	17	18	19	20	21	22	23	24	25	26	27	28
Stadium	A	A	A	A	A	H	H	H	A	A	H	A	H	H	A	H	A	A	H	H	A	H	A	H	H	A	H	H
Result	D	W	L	W	L	L	W	W	W	W	D	L	W	W	L	W	L	W	D	W	W	W	W	W	W	D	W	L

Updated to match(es) played on August 17, 2014. Source: Match reports
A = Away; H = Home; W = Win; D = Draw; L = Loss

==== Standings ====
Pos	Team	Pld	W	T	L	GF	GA	GD	Pts	Qualification
1	Orlando City (C)	28	19	5	4	56	24	+32	62	Commissioner's Cup, Playoffs
2	Sacramento Republic FC (A)	28	17	4	7	49	28	+21	55	Playoffs
3	LA Galaxy II (A)	28	15	6	7	54	38	+16	51	Playoffs
4	Richmond Kickers (A)	28	13	12	3	53	28	+25	51	Playoffs
5	Charleston Battery (A)	28	11	8	9	36	31	+5	41	Playoffs

Source: USL Pro official standings
Rules for classification: 1) points; 2) goal difference; 3) number of goals scored.
(A) Advances to USL Pro Playoffs; (C) Commissioner's Cup (best regular season record)

=== USL Pro Playoffs ===
Quarterfinals
1	Orlando City	0
8	Harrisburg City Islanders	1
4	Richmond Kickers (a.e.t.)	2
5	Charleston Battery	1
2	Sacramento Republic	4
7	Wilmington Hammerheads	1
3	LA Galaxy II	2
6	Rochester Rhinos	1

Semifinals
8	Harrisburg City Islanders	3
4	Richmond Kickers	2
2	Sacramento Republic	3
3	LA Galaxy II	2

USL Pro Championship
8	Harrisburg City Islanders	0
2	Sacramento Republic	2

September 13, 2014 QF	Sacramento Republic	4–1	Wilmington Hammerheads FC	Sacramento, California
7:30pm	Vuković (yellow card) 10' (goal) 40' 67'; Daly 64'; Jahn 88'	Report	Nicholson (yellow card) 42'; Ruggles (yellow card) 54'; Ochoa 58' (pen.)	Stadium: Bonney Field; Attendance: 8,000; Referee: Michael Zapata

September 20, 2014 SF	Sacramento Republic	3–2	LA Galaxy II	Sacramento, California
7:30pm	Lopez 70' (pen.) 84' (pen.) 90+'	Report	Rugg 26' 44'	Stadium: Bonney Field; Attendance: 8,000; Referee: Baboucarr Jallow

September 27, 2014 Final	Sacramento Republic	2–0	Harrisburg City Islanders	Sacramento, California
7:30pm	Guzman 36'; Evans (yellow card) 90'; Stewart 90+'	Report; Report; Report; Report	Langley (yellow card) 46'	Stadium: Bonney Field; Attendance: 8,000; Referee: Ricardo Salazar

=== U.S. Open Cup ===
May 14 2	Sacramento Republic (California)	2–1	(California) Ventura County Fusion	Sacramento, California
19:00 PT	Delbridge 59'; Daly (yellow card) 76'; Collins 78'; Mirković (yellow card) 83'	Report	Rideout 36'; Vale (yellow card) 77'; Torre (red card) 88'	Stadium: Cosumnes River College; Attendance: 1,347

May 28 3	Sacramento Republic (California)	6–0	(California) Fresno Fuego	Sacramento, California
19:30 PT	Mirković (yellow card) 16' (yellow-red card) 90'; Vuković 45'; Braun 53'; Stewart 61'; López 76'; Klimenta 81'; Evans 89'	Report	Edmonds (yellow card) 33' (yellow-red card) 41'; Garcia (yellow card) 70'	Stadium: Cosumnes River College; Attendance: 1,523

June 11 4	San Jose Earthquakes (California)	2–1	(California) Sacramento Republic	San Francisco, California
19:00 PT	Harris (yellow card) 32'; Lenhart (yellow card) 45'; Stephenson 45+' (pen.); Cato 73'; Harden (yellow card) 83'; Pierazzi (yellow card) 90'	Report	Delbridge (yellow card) 3'; Braun 42'; Bartlomé (yellow card) 45' (yellow-red card) 78'	Stadium: Kezar Stadium; Attendance: 3788

=== Friendlies ===
July 6 Friendly	Sacramento Republic (United States)	1–2	(Mexico) Club Atlas	Sacramento, California
18:30 PST	Alvarez 40'; Avesyan (yellow card) 84'	Report	Hernández (yellow card) 78'; Ponce 80'; Brambila (yellow card) 82'; Caballero 84'	Stadium: Bonney Field; Attendance: 8,000

July 19 Friendly	Sacramento Republic (United States)	1–2	(Scotland) Rangers F.C.	Sacramento, California
19:30 PST	Bond (yellow card) 13'; Martinez 45'; Evans (yellow card) 60'	Report	Black (yellow card) 47'; McGregor 48'; Faure (yellow card) 62'; Black 90+'	Stadium: Bonney Field; Attendance: 8,000

July 21 Friendly	Sacramento Republic (United States)	0–1	(England) West Bromwich Albion F.C.	Sacramento, California
19:30 PST	Vuković (yellow card) 12'; Mirković (yellow card) 72'	Report	Dorrans 13' (pen.); Mulumbu (yellow card) 37'; Gardner (yellow card) 42' (yellow-red card) 82'	Stadium: Bonney Field; Attendance: 7,461

July 25 Friendly	Sacramento Republic (United States)	1–3	(England) West Bromwich Albion F.C.	Sacramento, California
19:30 PST	Gabe Padilla (yellow card) 68'; J.J. Koval 73' (yellow card) 76'	Report	Berahino 13'; Mulumbu 30'; Anichebe 62'	Stadium: Bonney Field; Attendance: 8,000

September 30 Friendly	Real Salt Lake (United States)	2–0	(United States) Sacramento Republic	Sandy, Utah
18:30 PST	Findley 57' (pen.); Velásquez 90'	Report; Report	López (yellow card) 27' Max Alvarez (yellow card) 45'; Mirković (yellow card) 54'	Stadium: Rio Tinto; Attendance: 20,555

== Transfers ==
=== In ===
No.	Pos.	Player	Transferred from	Fee/notes	Date	Source
8	MF	(United States) Rodrigo López	(United States) Los Angeles Blues		January 1, 2014	
11	FW	(United States) Max Alvarez	(United States) FC Tucson		January 1, 2014	
12	DF	(Montenegro) Nemanja Vuković	(Ukraine) FC Hoverla Uzhhorod		January 24, 2014	
5	FW	(United States) Chad Bartlomé	(Switzerland) BSC Old Boys		February 4, 2014	
26	FW	(Liberia) Gabe Gissie	(United States) New England Revolution		February 11, 2014	
17	FW	(United States) Justin Braun	(United States) Toronto FC		February 11, 2014	
23	MF	(Montenegro) Emrah Klimenta	(United States) Bay Area Ambassadors		February 14, 2014	
21	DF	(United States) Mickey Daly	(United States) Wilmington Hammerheads		February 14, 2014	
18	MF	(Serbia) Ivan Mirković	(United States) Ventura County Fusion		February 14, 2014	
9	FW	(United States) Dakota Collins	(United States) FC Tucson		February 20, 2014	
3	DF	(United States) Jack Avesyan	(United States) Ventura County Fusion		March 1, 2014	
25	GK	(United States) Dominik Jakubek	(United States) Los Angeles Blues		March 4, 2014	
4	MF	(Wales) Chad Bond	(Wales) Port Talbot Town F.C.		March 4, 2014	
10	FW	(Northern Ireland) Thomas Stewart	(Republic of Ireland) Shamrock Rovers		March 4, 2014	
7	MF	(Brazil) Gilberto	(United States) Philadelphia Union		March 13, 2014	
6	DF	(England) Jack Lane	(United States) Ventura County Fusion		March 19, 2014	
22	DF	(Australia) Harrison Delbridge	(United States) Ventura County Fusion		March 20, 2014	
20	MF	(United States) Carlos Martinez	(Germany) FC Energie Cottbus		March 20, 2014	
19	MF	(United States) Octavio Guzmán	(United States) Chico State Wildcats		March 24, 2014	
13	DF	(United States) Christian Gonzalez	(United States) Houston Dynamo		March 29, 2014	
28	DF	(United States) James Kiffe	(United States) Ventura County Fusion		August 16, 2014	
40	MF	(United States) Agustin Cazarez	(United States) Ventura County Fusion		August 19, 2014	
43	FW	(Bosnia and Herzegovina) Izzy Tandir	(France) FC Sochaux		August 19, 2014	

=== Out ===
No.	Pos.	Player	Transferred to	Fee/notes	Date	Source
6	DF	(England) Jack Lane	(England) Ilkeston	Released from contract	June 26, 2014	
4	DF	(Wales) Chad Bond	Free agent	Released from contract	August 16, 2014	
3	DF	(United States) Jack Avesyan	Free agent	Released from contract	December 31, 2014	
6	FW	(United States) Chad Bartlomé	Free agent	Released from contract	December 31, 2014	
13	MF	(United States) Christian Gonzalez	Free agent	Released from contract	December 31, 2014	
20	MF	(United States) Carlos Martinez	Free agent	Released from contract	December 31, 2014	

=== Loan in ===
No.	Pos.	Player	Loaned from	Start	End	Source
1	GK	(New Zealand) Jake Gleeson	(United States) Portland Timbers			
2	FW	(United States) Mike Fucito	(United States) San Jose Earthquakes		August 1, 2014	
14	FW	(United States) Adam Jahn	(United States) San Jose Earthquakes			
16	FW	(United States) Tommy Thompson	(United States) San Jose Earthquakes			
24	MF	(United States) George Fochive	(United States) Portland Timbers		August 19, 2014	
27	DF	(Jamaica) Alvas Powell	(United States) Portland Timbers		August 19, 2014	
29	MF	(United States) Jeffrey "J.J." Koval	(United States) San Jose Earthquakes			
32	MF	(United States) Steven Evans	(United States) Portland Timbers			

== See also ==
- 2014 in American soccer
- 2014 USL Pro season
- Sacramento Republic FC
