= 2015 Sacramento Republic FC season =

Sacramento Republic FC
2015 season
- Owner: Warren Smith
- Head coach: Preki (Through July 11); Paul Buckle (From July 12)
- Stadium: Bonney Field; Hughes Stadium (February 28th)
- USL Pro Playoffs: 1st round
- U.S. Open Cup: 4th round
- Top goalscorer: League: Rodrigo López (9); All: Rodrigo López (11)
- Highest home attendance: League: 11,442 (Multiple matches); All: 20,231 (Feb. 28 vs. NY Cosmos)
- Lowest home attendance: League: 10,906 (Twice); All: 9,794 (Feb. 21 vs. San Jose)
- Average home league attendance: League: 11,303; All: 11,556
Home colors	Away colors	Third colors

The 2015 Sacramento Republic FC season was the club's second season of existence. The club played in the newly rebranded United Soccer League (USL), formerly known as USL Pro, the third tier of the American soccer pyramid. After offseason expansion of the USL from 14 to 24 teams and division into an Eastern and Western Conference, Sacramento Republic FC competed in the new Western Conference. The Republic entered the season as defending champions, having defeated the Harrisburg City Islanders 2–0 in the USL final on September 27, 2014. The season began on March 21 and concluded on September 20.

== Background ==
Winter 2014–15, USL Pro's off season, saw numerous headlines for Sacramento Republic FC. Owner Warren Smith, Technical Director Graham Smith, Sacramento Mayor Kevin Johnson and other delegates met with MLS officials, including Commissioner Don Garber, several times to continue their push for a MLS franchise. MLS announced February 2015 that Las Vegas was no longer in contention for an MLS franchise, narrowing the list of potentials to Sacramento and Minneapolis.

Republic's efforts with MLS as well as their successes on and off the pitch rallied many to help invest in the club to push further Republic FC's efforts for an MLS franchise. These investors include co-founder and ex-CEO of Envision Pharmaceutical Kevin Negal, UFC fighter Urijah Faber, Sacramento Kings owner Vivek Ranadivé, San Francisco 49ers owners the York Family.

As success and popularity grew, demand for more seating at Bonny Field grew. The Board of Directors of Cal Expo approved expanded seating at Bonney Field and the endline stands were removed and replaced with 30-row bleachers, increasing the capacity to around 11,000.

For the 2015 season, USL Pro expanded to 24 teams, including Portland Timbers 2, concluding Portland's USL affiliation with the Republic.

== Club ==
As of June 19, 2015.

No.	Position	Nation	Player
1	GK	USA	Dominik Jakubek
2	DF	IRL	Derek Foran
3	FW	USA	Cameron Iwasa
4	MF	USA	Matthias Bonvehi
5	DF	USA	Danny Barrera
6	MF	USA	Agustin Cazarez
7	MF	BRA	Gilberto
8	MF	USA	Rodrigo López (vice-captain)
9	FW	LBR	Gabe Gissie
10	FW	NIR	Thomas Stewart
11	FW	USA	Max Alvarez
12	DF	MNE	Nemanja Vuković
13	FW	CRO	Adnan Gabeljic
14	FW	MEX	David Estrada
15	FW	PAK	Kaleemullah Khan
16	MF	USA	Zev Taublieb
17	FW	USA	Justin Braun (captain)
18	MF	SRB	Ivan Mirković
19	MF	MEX	Octavio Guzmán
20	DF	USA	James Kiffe
21	DF	USA	Michael Daly
22	MF	MEX	Gabe Gonzalez
23	DF	MNE	Emrah Klimenta
24	GK	USA	Patrick McLain
25	FW	SLV	Joaquin Rivas
26	MF	USA	Alfonso Motagalvan

=== Technical Staff ===
As of June 25, 2015.

Position	Name
Technical director	(England) Graham Smith
Head coach	(England) Paul Buckle
Assistant head coach	(United States) Adam Charles Smith
Assistant coach	(United States) Chris Malenab
Assistant coach	(United States) Antonio Sutton
Goalkeeping coach	(England) Simon Sheppard
Strength & Conditioning Coach	(United States) Luke Rayfield

== Competitions ==
=== Preseason ===
February 7, 2015	Fresno Fuego	2–2	Sacramento Republic	Fresno, California
19:00 PST	Ellison (yellow card) 18'; Chaney (yellow card) 66'; Kazinsky 75', 83'; Grande (yellow card) 80'	Report	Gissie (yellow card) 38'; Cardozo 70', 74'; Gonzalez (yellow card) 87'	Stadium: Chukchansi Park; Attendance: 4,000

February 9, 2015	Ventura County Fusion	0–4	Sacramento Republic	Ventura, California
19:00 PST	(yellow card) 71'	Report	Gonzalez 11'; Cardozo 12'; Gabeljic 23'; Ogbanje 62'	Stadium: Ventura College Sportsplex

February 11, 2015	UC Santa Barbara Gauchos	1–4	Sacramento Republic	Santa Barbara, California
19:00 PST			Stewart, Abolaji; Rivas	Stadium: Rob Field

February 21, 2015	Sacramento Republic	0–1	San Jose Earthquakes	Sacramento, California
17:00 PST	Duckett (yellow card) 28'; López (yellow card) 48'; Mirković (yellow card) 59'; Klimenta (yellow card) 76'	Report	Salinas (yellow card) 25'; García 51'	Stadium: Bonney Field; Attendance: 9,794

February 28, 2015	Sacramento Republic	1–3	New York Cosmos	Sacramento, California
19:00 PST	Rivas 89'	Report	Raúl 68'; Fernandes 76'; Flores 81'	Stadium: Hughes Stadium; Attendance: 20,231

March 14, 2015	UC Davis Aggies	0 - 1	Sacramento Republic	Davis, California
15:00 PST	(yellow card) 51'; (yellow card) 65'		Gonzalez 7'; AHC Adam Smith (red card) 45'; Kiffe (red card) 65'	Stadium: Aggie Soccer Field; Attendance: 1,344
Note: Preki forfeited the match in the 66', citing concerns with the physicality of the match.

=== USL ===
March 21, 2015 1	Seattle Sounders 2	4 - 2	Sacramento Republic FC	Starfire Sports Complex, Tukwila
19:30	Craven 49'; Garza 70'; Rossi 75'; Roldan 88'	Report	Braun 64'; Guzman 90'	Attendance: 2,951; Referee: (The Gambia) Baboucarr Jallow

March 28, 2015 2	LA Galaxy II	2 - 3	Sacramento Republic FC	StubHub Center, Carson
19:30	Steres 8'; Covarrubias (yellow card) 22'; Auras (yellow card) 35'; Bli (yellow card) 37'; Bowen 66'	Report	Guzman 13' (pen.), 25' (pen.), (yellow card) 77'; Rivas (yellow card) 54'; Mirković (yellow card) 84'; López 90+'	Attendance: 1,292

April 2, 2015 3	Portland Timbers 2	2 - 1	Sacramento Republic FC	Merlo Field, Portland
19:00	Belmar 62'; Peay (yellow card) 69'; Evans 87'	Report	Foran (yellow card) 35'; Daly (yellow card) 59'; Iwasa 61'	Attendance: 2,501

April 11, 2015 4	Sacramento Republic FC	3 - 1	LA Galaxy II	Bonney Field, Sacramento
19:30	López 22'; Klimenta 27'; Estrada 45'; Daly (yellow card) 77'	Report	McBean (yellow card) 19'; Villarreal (yellow card) 32'; Lassiter 58'	Attendance: 10,906

April 15, 2015 5	Sacramento Republic FC	2 - 0	Whitecaps FC 2	Bonney Field, Sacramento
19:30	Kiffe (yellow card) 20'; López 32', 71'; Daly (yellow card) 47'	Report	Parker (yellow card) 19'	Attendance: 10,906

April 18, 2015 6	Sacramento Republic FC	3 - 0	Portland Timbers 2	Bonney Field, Sacramento
19:30	López 13'; Daly 37'; Mirković (yellow card) 44'; Braun (yellow card) 56'; Alvarez (yellow card) 66'; Taublieb 82'	Report		Attendance: 11,242

April 24, 2015 7	Sacramento Republic FC	1 - 2	Orange County Blues	Bonney Field, Sacramento
19:30	Braun 7' (yellow card) 88'	Report	Slager 38'; Filipović (yellow card) 41'; Crettenand 45'; Ramírez (yellow card) 53'; Petričević (red card) 60'; Barron (yellow card) 83'	Attendance: 11,242

April 29, 2015 8	Real Monarchs	1 - 0	Sacramento Republic FC	Rio Tinto Stadium, Sandy
18:00	Rauhofer (yellow card) 51' (goal) 67'	Report	Braun (yellow card) 56'; Alvarez (yellow card) 65'	Attendance: 2,477

May 9, 2015 9	Sacramento Republic FC	3 - 0	Seattle Sounders 2	Bonney Field, Sacramento
19:30	Vuković 19'; Daly (yellow card) 28'; López 62'; Gabeljic 73'	Report	Frano (yellow card) 27' (yellow-red card) 65'; Lowe (yellow card) 34'; McCormick (yellow card) 58'	Attendance: 11,242; Referee: Victor Rivas

May 17, 2015 10	LA Galaxy II	0 - 1	Sacramento Republic FC	StubHub Center, Carson
17:00		Report	López 65'

May 23, 2015 11	OKC Energy	2 - 1	Sacramento Republic FC	Taft Stadium, Oklahoma City
17:00	Dalgaard 20' (yellow card) 60'; König 35'; Doue (yellow card) 66' (yellow-red card) 80'	Report	López (red card) 9'; Iwasa (yellow card) 44'; Foran (yellow card) 45'; Vuković (yellow card) 45'; Gabeljic 62'	Attendance: N/A

May 30, 2015 12	Sacramento Republic FC	1 - 1	Real Monarchs	Bonney Field, Sacramento
19:30	Rauhofer 7' (yellow card) 70'; Orozco (yellow card) 15' (yellow-red card) 89'; Ovalle (yellow card) 76'	Report	Estrada 19'; Vuković (yellow card) 65'; Mirković (yellow card) 87'	Attendance: 11,442

June 6, 2015 13	Sacramento Republic FC	0 - 1	Austin Aztex	Bonney Field, Sacramento
20:00	Foran (yellow card) 24'; Braun (yellow card) 57'	Report	Golden (yellow card) 52'; Typrak 58'	Attendance: 11,442

June 13, 2015 14	Arizona United	1 - 2	Sacramento Republic FC	Scottsdale Stadium, Scottsdale
19:30	Tan 9'; Garcia (yellow card) 44'	Report	Cazarez 76'; Barrera 83'	Attendance: 3,318

June 20, 2015 15	Sacramento Republic FC	2–1	OKC Energy	Bonney Field, Sacramento
20:00	Andrews 39' (o.g.); Mirković (yellow card) 45'; Vuković (yellow card) 72'; Gissie 80'	Report	König 19'; Greig (yellow card) 22'	Attendance: 11,442

June 25, 2015 16	Tulsa Roughnecks	1 - 3	Sacramento Republic FC	ONEOK Field, Tulsa
17:30	Mata 72'	Report	Estrada 20'; López 37', 76' (yellow card) 80'; Kaleemullah (yellow card) 66'	Attendance: 3,708

June 27, 2015 17	Austin Aztex	0 - 0	Sacramento Republic FC	House Park, Austin
18:00		Report	Daly (yellow card) 18'	Attendance: 2,860

July 1, 2015 18	Real Monarchs	1 - 1	Sacramento Republic FC	Rio Tinto Stadium, Sandy
18:00	Tavares 61'; Rauhofer (yellow card) 74'; Arnone (yellow card) 77'	Report	Braun 19'; Mirković (yellow card) 76'	Attendance: n/a

July 11, 2015 19	Sacramento Republic FC	0 - 4	LA Galaxy II	Bonney Field, Sacramento
20:00	Guzman (yellow card) 49'	Report	Villarreal 17'; Lassiter 47'; Auras 50'; Covarrubias (yellow card) 55'; McBean 76'	Attendance: 11,442

August 1, 2015 20	Sacramento Republic FC	2 - 0	Seattle Sounders 2	Bonney Field, Sacramento
20:00	Stewart 36', 83'	Report	Sanyang (red card) 76'; Rossi (yellow card) 88'	Attendance: 11,442

August 8, 2015 21	Sacramento Republic FC	0 - 1	Colorado Springs Switchbacks	Bonney Field, Sacramento
20:00	López (yellow card) 37'	Report	Argueta 3' (yellow card) 80'; Gonzalez (yellow card) 88'	Attendance: 11,442

August 14, 2015 22	Colorado Springs Switchbacks	3 - 3	Sacramento Republic FC	Sand Creek Stadium, Colorado Springs
18:00	Argueta (yellow card) 10'; Vercollone 21' (pen.), 38'; Hoffman 78'; Armstrong (red card) 90'	Report	Stewart 2'; Vuković (yellow card) 19'; Daly 82'; Mirković 90'	Attendance: 3,152

August 22, 2015 23	Sacramento Republic FC	1 - 1	Real Monarchs	Bonney Field, Sacramento
20:00	Braun (yellow card) 56' (goal) 67'; Mirković (yellow card) 61'; Klimenta (yellow card) 90'	Report	Kavita (yellow card) 14'; Orozco (yellow card) 60'; Welshman (yellow card) 84'; Baldin 86'	Attendance: 11,442

August 29, 2015 24	Sacramento Republic FC	3 - 1	Tulsa Roughnecks	Bonney Field, Sacramento
20:00

September 6, 2015 25	Whitecaps FC 2	1 - 2	Sacramento Republic FC	Sand Creek Stadium, Colorado Springs
15:00

September 12, 2015 26	Portland Timbers 2	0 - 3	Sacramento Republic FC	Providence Park, Portland
19:00

September 16, 2015 27	Orange County Blues	0 - 0	Sacramento Republic FC	Anteater Stadium, Irvine
19:30

September 19, 2015 28	Sacramento Republic FC	0 - 0	Arizona United	Bonney Field, Sacramento
19:30

=== Results summary ===
Overall								Home						Away					
Pld	W	D	L	GF	GA	GD	Pts	W	D	L	GF	GA	GD	W	D	L	GF	GA	GD
23	10	5	8	35	29	+6	35	6	2	4	18	12	+6	4	3	4	17	17	0

Round	1	2	3	4	5	6	7	8	9	10	11	12	13	14	15	16	17	18	19	20	21	22	23	24	25	26	27	28
Stadium	A	A	A	A	H	H	H	A	H	A	A	H	H	A	H	A	A	A	H	H	H	A	H	H	A	A	A	H
Result	L	W	L	W	W	W	L	L	W	W	L	D	L	W	W	W	D	D	L	W	L	D	D	W	W	W	D	D

Updated to match(es) played on February 24, 2015. Source:
A = Away; H = Home; W = Win; D = Draw; L = Loss

==== Standings ====
Pos	Team	Pld	W	D	L	GF	GA	GD	Pts	Qualification
2	Oklahoma City Energy	28	13	8	7	44	36	+8	47	Conference semi-finals
3	Colorado Springs Switchbacks	28	14	4	10	53	35	+18	46	First round
4	Sacramento Republic	28	13	7	8	43	31	+12	46	First round
5	LA Galaxy II	28	14	3	11	39	31	+8	45	First round
6	Seattle Sounders 2	28	13	3	12	45	42	+3	42	First round

Source: 2015 USL schedule
Rules for classification: 1) head-to-head; 2) total wins; 3) total goal differential; 4) total goals scored; 5) disciplinary points; 6) away goals scored; 7) away goal differential; 8) home goals scored; 9) home goal differential; 10) coin toss or drawing of lots

=== USL Pro Playoffs ===
First round
September 26
#4 New York Red Bulls II (a.e.t.)	4
#5 Pittsburgh Riverhounds	2
September 26
#3 Charleston Battery (a.e.t.)	2
#6 Richmond Kickers	1
September 26
#4 Sacramento Republic FC	0
#5 LA Galaxy II	1
September 25
#3 Colorado Springs Switchbacks FC	2
#6 Seattle Sounders FC 2	0

Conference Semifinals
October 3
#1 Rochester Rhinos	2
#4 New York Red Bulls II	0
October 3
#2 Louisville City FC (a.e.t.)	2
#3 Charleston Battery	0
October 3
#1 Orange County Blues FC	0
#5 LA Galaxy II	2
October 4
#2 Oklahoma City Energy FC (p)	2 (4)
#3 Colorado Springs Switchbacks FC	2 (3)

Conference Finals
October 10
#1 Rochester Rhinos	1
#2 Louisville City FC	0
October 11
#5 LA Galaxy II	2
#2 Oklahoma City Energy FC	1

USL Championship
October 16
#1 Rochester Rhinos (a.e.t.)	2
#5 LA Galaxy II	1

==== Playoff Results ====
September 26, 2015 1st Round	Sacramento Republic	0 - 1	LA Galaxy II	Sacramento, California
7:30pm	López (yellow card) 42'; Kiffe (yellow card) 69'; Jakubek (yellow card) 90'; Vuković (yellow card) 90'	Report	Olivera 42' (pen.); Bowen (yellow card) 36'; Covarrubias (yellow card) 42'; Walker (yellow card) 89'	Stadium: Bonney Field; Attendance: 11,442

=== U.S. Open Cup ===
May 20, 2015 Round 2	Sacramento Republic (California)	4–2	(California) Sonoma County Sol	Sacramento, California
19:30 PT	Stewart 9', 43', 61'; Gonzalez 12'	Report	Acevedo (yellow card) 14'; Nuno 26', 73'; Arroyo (yellow card) 86'; Boone (yellow card) 90'	Stadium: Bonney Field; Attendance: 10,386

May 27, 2015 Round 3	Sacramento Republic (California)	7 - 3	(California) Chula Vista FC	Sacramento, California
19:30 PT	Guzman 9'; Jakubek (yellow card) 39'; Gabeljic 43', 59', 89'; Taublieb (yellow card) 59' (goal) 74'; Stewart 52'; López 85'	Report	Pinal (yellow card) 25'; Ramirez 40' (pen.); Estrada 74'; Rubio 81'	Stadium: Bonney Field; Attendance: 10,018

June 18, 2015 Round 4	San Jose Earthquakes (California)	2 - 2 (6-5 p)	(California) Sacramento Republic	San Jose, California
19:30 PT	Wondolowski 74', 79'; Bernardez (yellow card) 105'	Report	López 6' (pen.); Klimenta 54'	Stadium: Avaya Stadium; Attendance: 13,196
	Penalties
	Wondolowski (penalty scored); Bernardez (penalty scored); Stephenson (penalty missed); Pierazzi (penalty missed); Thompson (penalty scored); Koval (penalty scored); Barrera (penalty scored); Francis (penalty scored)		(penalty scored) López; (penalty scored) Vuković; (penalty missed) Daly; (penalty scored) Gilberto; (penalty missed) Klimenta; (penalty scored) Estrada; (penalty scored) Gabeljic; (penalty missed) Kiffe

=== Friendlies ===
July 8, 2015 Friendly	Sacramento Republic (United States)	1 - 4	(Mexico) Club Atlas	Sacramento, California
20:00 PT	Stewart 13'; Motagalvan (yellow card) 63'; Barrera (yellow card) 71'	Report	Vigón 25'; Caballero 58'; Medina 64' (pen.); Ramírez (yellow card) 69'; Zárate (yellow card) 84'	Stadium: Bonney Field; Attendance: 10,419

July 14, 2015 Friendly	Sacramento Republic (United States)	1 - 0	(England) Sunderland AFC	Sacramento, California
20:00 PT	Mirković (yellow card) 41'; Iwasa 58'; Kiffe (yellow card) 72'	Report	Cattermole (yellow card) 74'; Mannone (yellow card) 80'	Stadium: Bonney Field

July 18, 2015 Friendly	Sacramento Republic (United States)	0 - 1	(England) Newcastle United FC	Sacramento, California
20:00 PT	López (yellow card) 87'	Report	Kiffe 47' (o.g.); Haidara (yellow card) 65'	Stadium: Bonney Field; Attendance: 11,442

November 14, 2015 Champions Soccer LLC International Soccer Challenge	Sacramento Republic (United States)	1–5	(United States) LA Galaxy II	Bakersfield, California
16:45 PT	Trialist	Report	Villareal; Trialist; Jamieson IV; Lassiter	Stadium: Memorial Stadium

== Transfers ==
=== In ===
No.	Pos.	Player	Transferred from	Fee/notes	Date	Source
24	GK	(United States) Patrick McLain	(United States) Orange County Blues FC	Free	February 17, 2015	
99	DF	(United States) Bilal Duckett	(United States) Charlotte Eagles	Free	March 6, 2015	
16	MF	(United States) Zev Taublieb	(United States) Valparaiso University	Free	March 6, 2015	
22	MF	(Mexico) Gabe Gonzalez	(United States) Orange County Blues FC	Free	March 6, 2015	
26	MF	(United States) Alfonso Motagalvan	(United States) Pittsburgh Riverhounds	Free	March 6, 2015	
2	DF	(Republic of Ireland) Derek Foran	(Republic of Ireland) St. Patrick’s Athletic	Free	March 10, 2015	
4	DF	(United States) Matthias Bonvehi	(Philippines) Stallion FC	Free	March 10, 2015	
13	FW	(United States) Adnan Gabeljic	(Croatia) NK Rudeš	Free	March 10, 2015	
25	FW	(El Salvador) Joaquin Rivas	(United States) Kitsap Pumas	Free	March 10, 2015	
3	FW	(Mexico) David Estrada	(United States) D.C. United		March 20, 2015	
14	FW	(United States) Cameron Iwasa	(United States) UC Irvine		March 20, 2015	
7	MF	(Brazil) Gilberto	(United States) Marília	Return from Loan	April 30, 2015	
5	MF	(Colombia) Danny Barrera	(United States) Carolina RailHawks		June 6, 2015	
15	FW	(Pakistan) Kaleemullah	(Kyrgyzstan) FC Dordoi Bishkek		June 18, 2015	

=== Out ===
No.	Pos.	Player	Transferred to	Fee/notes	Date	Source
7	MF	(Brazil) Gilberto	(United States) Marília	Loan	January 15, 2015	
22	DF	(Australia) Harrison Delbridge	(United States) Portland Timbers 2		February 19, 2015	
9	FW	(United States) Dakota Collins	(United States) NK HAŠK		February 20, 2015	
43	FW	(Bosnia and Herzegovina) Izzy Tandir	(Iceland) Breiðablik		March 12, 2015	
99	DF	(United States) Bilal Duckett	(United States) Charlotte Independence		April 9, 2015	
14	FW	(Mexico) David Estrada	(United States) Orange County Blues		August 10, 2015	
16	MF	(United States) Zev Taublieb	(United States) Wilmington Hammerheads FC		August 20, 2015	
22	MF	(Mexico) Gabe González	(United States) Ventura County Fusion		August 20, 2015	
28	MF	(Mexico) Rodrigo Lopez	(Mexico) Celaya FC		October 8, 2015	
7	MF	(Brazil) Gilberto	(United States) Marília		November 30, 2015	
4	DF	(United States) Matthias Bonvehi	Free Agent		November 30, 2015	
9	FW	(Liberia) Gabe Gissie	(United States) Bethlehem Steel FC		December 11, 2015	
21	DF	(United States) Mikey Daly	(United States) Bethlehem Steel FC		December 11, 2015	
15	FW	(Pakistan) Kaleemullah Khan	(United States) Tulsa Roughnecks FC		December 17, 2015	

=== Loan in ===
No.	Pos.	Player	Transferred from	Fee/notes	Date	Source
16	MF	(United States) Tommy Thompson	(United States) San Jose Earthquakes		August 29, 2015	
3	MF	(United States) J.J. Koval	(United States) San Jose Earthquakes		August 29, 2015	
22	FW	(United States) Mark Sherrod	(United States) San Jose Earthquakes		August 29, 2015	
