= List of Sacramento Republic FC seasons =

Since its inaugural season in 2014, the American soccer club Sacramento Republic FC has competed in the USL Championship, the second division of American soccer, previously known as USL and USL Pro. The team is scheduled to join Major League Soccer as an expansion franchise in 2023. The following is a complete list of seasons for the club, including team and individual statistics for all competitive competitions that the club has partaken in.

== Key ==
Key to competitions

- Major League Soccer (MLS) – The top-flight of soccer in the United States, established in 1996.
- USL Championship (USLC) – The second division of soccer in the United States, established in 2010 and previously known as USL and USL Pro. The Championship was the third division of American soccer from its founding until its elevation to second division status in 2017.
- U.S. Open Cup (USOC) – The premier knockout cup competition in US soccer, first contested in 1914.
- CONCACAF Champions League (CCL) – The premier competition in North American soccer since 1962. It went by the name of Champions' Cup until 2008.

Key to colors and symbols

1st or W	Winners
2nd or RU	Runners-up
Last	Wooden Spoon
♦	League Golden Boot
	Highest average attendance

Key to league record

- Season = The year and article of the season
- Div = Level on pyramid
- League = League name
- Pld = Games played
- W = Games won
- L = Games lost
- D = Games drawn
- GF = Goals scored
- GA = Goals against
- Pts = Points
- PPG = Points per game
- Conf = Conference position
- Overall = League position

Key to cup record

- DNE = Did not enter
- DNQ = Did not qualify
- NH = Competition not held or canceled
- QR = Qualifying round
- PR = Preliminary round
- GS = Group stage
- R1 = First round
- R2 = Second round
- R3 = Third round
- R4 = Fourth round
- R5 = Fifth round
- QF = Quarterfinals
- SF = Semifinals
- RU = Runners-up
- W = Winners

== Seasons ==
Season	League											Position		Playoffs	USOC	Continental / Other	Average attendance ^{1}	Top goalscorer(s) ^{2}	
Season	Div	League	Pld	W	L	D	GF	GA	GD	Pts	PPG	Conf.	Overall	Playoffs	USOC	Continental / Other	Average attendance ^{1}	Name	Goals
2014	3	USL Pro	28	17	7	4	49	28	+21	55	1.96	N/A	2nd	W	R4	Ineligible	11,293	(Northern Ireland) Thomas Stewart	13
2015	3	USL	28	13	8	7	43	31	+12	46	1.64	4th	6th	R1	R4	DNQ	11,329	(United States) Rodrigo López	11
2016	3	USL	30	14	6	10	43	27	+16	52	1.73	1st	4th	R1	R3	DNQ	11,514	(United States) Cameron Iwasa	12
2017	2	USL	32	13	12	7	45	43	+2	46	1.44	8th	13th	QF	Ro16	DNQ	11,569	(Trinidad and Tobago) Trevin Caesar	9
2018	2	USL	34	19	7	8	47	32	+15	65	1.91	2nd	4th	R1	Ro16	DNQ	11,311	(United States) Cameron Iwasa	18
2019	2	USLC	34	14	14	6	50	43	+7	48	1.41	7th	15th	QF	R4	DNQ	10,436	(United States) Cameron Iwasa	17
2020	2	USLC	16	8	2	6	27	17	+10	30	1.88	5th	10th	R1	NH	DNQ	11,569	(Poland) Dariusz Formella	8
2021	2	USLC	32	8	12	12	36	42	-6	36	1.13	13th	24th	DNQ	NH	DNQ	6,926	(United States) Cameron Iwasa	8
2022	2	USLC	34	15	11	8	48	34	+14	53	1.56	4th	10th	QF	RU	DNQ	9,876	(Jamaica) Maalique Foster (Mexico) Rodrigo López	8
2023	2	USLC	34	18	6	10	51	26	+25	64	1.88	1st	2nd	SF	R5	DNQ	10,627	(United States) Russell Cicerone	17
2024	2	USLC	34	13	11	10	46	34	+12	49	1.44	5th	11th	R1	QF	DNQ	10,106	(England) Kieran Phillips	13
2025	2	USLC	30	13	9	8	44	27	+17	48	1.60	2nd	4th	R1	Ro32	DNQ	9,829	(United States) Russell Cicerone	8
2026	2	USLC	30	13	5	12	42	28	+14	51	1.70	2nd	4th	Champions	Ro32	DNQ	10,132	(Saint Vincent and the Grenadines) Kyle Edwards	11
Total	–	–	396	178	110	108	571	412	+159	643	1.62	–	–	–	–	–	–	(United States) Cameron Iwasa	59

1. Avg. attendance only includes statistics from regular season matches.
2. Top goalscorer(s) includes all goals scored in the regular season, league playoffs, U.S. Open Cup, CONCACAF Champions League, FIFA Club World Cup, and other competitive continental matches.
