= Cristian González =

Cristian González or Gonzáles may refer to:

- Cristian González (footballer, born 1976), Uruguayan defender
- Cristian González (footballer, born 1990), Argentine defender
- Cristian González (footballer, born 1993), Mexican defender
- Cristian González (footballer, born 1996), Uruguayan defender
- Cristian González (footballer, born 1998), Mexican defender
- Cristian Gonzáles (born 1976), Uruguayan-born Indonesian footballer
- Kily González (Cristian Alberto González, born 1974), Argentine footballer and coach

== See also ==
- Christian Gonzalez (born 2002), American football player
- Christian González (footballer), Chilean footballer
- Christian Nodal (born 1999), Mexican musician
