= Zev Taublieb =

American soccer player

Personal information
- Full name: Zev Cooper Taublieb
- Date of birth: June 26, 1993 (age 33)
- Place of birth: New York City, New York, United States
- Height: 5 ft 6 in (1.68 m)
- Position: Midfielder

Youth career
- 2007–2010: DMS11
- 2010–2011: Cosmos Academy West

College career
Years	Team	Apps	(Gls)
2011–2014	Valparaiso Crusaders	65	(3)

Senior career*
Years	Team	Apps	(Gls)
2013	Des Moines Menace	2	(0)
2014	Seattle Sounders FC U-23	5	(0)
2015	Sacramento Republic	10	(1)
2015–2016	Wilmington Hammerheads	26	(0)
2017	Charlotte Independence	0	(0)
2018	Varbergs BoIS	12	(0)
2019	Åtvidaberg	4	(0)
2020–2022	Richmond Kickers	1	(0)
- * Club domestic league appearances and goals as of December 7, 2022

Zev Cooper Taublieb (born June 26, 1993) is an American soccer player who plays as a midfielder.

== College and amateur ==
Taublieb played for the Cosmos West U18 Youth Academy prior to playing college soccer for the Valparaiso Crusaders between 2011 and 2014. During this period, he was invited to play with the youth program at Fulham for four consecutive years. In his final year as a Crusader, he was named an All-American by the Jewish Sports Review.

Taublieb spent the 2014 season with Seattle Sounders FC U-23.

== Club career ==
Taublieb joined Sacramento Republic FC prior to the start of the 2015 season as a trialist, ultimately signing his first professional contract with the team. He made his first competitive appearance for the Republic on April 11 in a 3–1 win over LA Galaxy II, coming on as a second half sub for midfielder Octavio Guzman. His first start came during the Republic's next match on April 15 in a win against Whitecaps FC 2. On April 18, he scored his first goal for the Republic in a 3–0 win against Portland Timbers 2.

On December 12, 2018, Taublieb signed for Åtvidabergs FF in Sweden.

Taublieb returned to the United States on May 11, 2020, joining USL League One side Richmond Kickers. He made his club debut on August 8 against Forward Madison, but suffered a season-ending injury just seven minutes after coming on as a substitute. Taublieb took a position as an assistant coach with the Viterbo V-Hawks men's soccer program during his rehab, then re-signed with the Kickers ahead of the 2021 season. However, due to rehab setbacks, Taublieb did not appear in a game during the entire season. After undergoing a second rehab stint and training with the club throughout the summer, he officially re-signed for a third season with Richmond on September 2, 2022.

== Career statistics ==
As of December 7, 2022

Appearances and goals by club, season and competition
Club	Season	League			Cup (Note: Includes the U.S. Open Cup and Svenska Cupen)		Continental		Other		Total	
Club	Season	Division	Apps	Goals	Apps	Goals	Apps	Goals	Apps	Goals	Apps	Goals
Des Moines Menace	2013	PDL	2	0	0	0	—		—		2	0
Seattle Sounders FC U-23	2014	PDL	5	0	—		—		—		5	0
Sacramento Republic	2015	USL	10	1	2	1	—		0	0	12	2
Wilmington Hammerheads	2015	USL	6	0	0	0	—		—		6	0
Wilmington Hammerheads	2016	USL	20	0	0	0	—		—		20	0
Wilmington Hammerheads	Total		26	0	0	0	0	0	0	0	26	0
Charlotte Independence	2017	USL	0	0	0	0	—		0	0	0	0
Varbergs BoIS	2018	Superettan	12	0	1	0	—		—		13	0
Åtvidaberg	2019	Division 1	4	0	—		—		—		4	0
Richmond Kickers	2020	USL League One	1	0	—		—		—		1	0
Richmond Kickers	2021	USL League One	0	0	—		—		0	0	0	0
Richmond Kickers	2022	USL League One	0	0	0	0	—		0	0	0	0
Richmond Kickers	Total		1	0	0	0	0	0	0	0	1	0
Career total			60	1	3	1	0	0	0	0	63	2
