= Gabe Gissie =

Liberian footballer (born 1996)

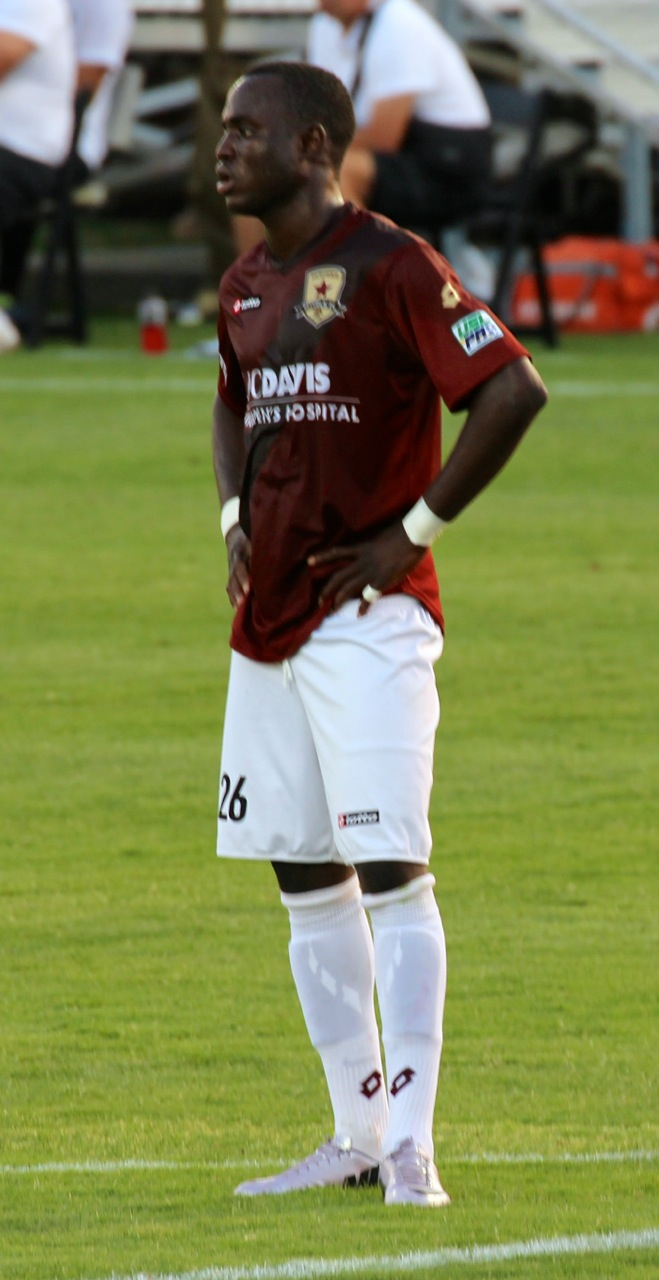

Personal information
- Full name: Mawolo Gabriel Gissie
- Date of birth: 23 November 1996 (age 29)
- Place of birth: Monrovia, Liberia
- Height: 6 ft 0 in (1.83 m)
- Position: Forward

Team information
- Current team: Rhode Island Reds
- Number: 12

Youth career
- 2011–2013: New England Revolution

Senior career*
Years	Team	Apps	(Gls)
2014–2015	Sacramento Republic	25	(1)
2016	Bethlehem Steel	18	(1)
2017	Sacramento Republic	11	(0)
2019	Rhode Island Reds	3	(3)
- * Club domestic league appearances and goals as of 23:21, 20 October 2017 (UTC) ‡ National team caps and goals as of March 22, 2016

Mawolo "Gabe" Gissie (born November 23, 1996) is a Liberian footballer currently playing for the Rhode Island Reds FC of the NPSL.

== Career ==
After being a member of the New England Revolution academy, Gissie signed his first professional contract on February 11, 2014, joining USL Pro club Sacramento Republic for their inaugural season. Gissie made his professional debut against Arizona United SC as an 87th-minute substitute. He was part of the team that won the 2014 USL Pro Championship.

On December 11, 2015, he joined the newly formed Bethlehem Steel FC with Sacramento teammate, Mikey Daly. At the conclusion of the 2016 season, Gissie was released by Steel FC after making 18 appearances and scoring once.

In December 2016, Gissie rejoined Sacramento Republic ahead of the 2017 season.

On May 30, 2019, Gissie made his debut with NPSL side Rhode Island Reds, coming on as a halftime substitute and scoring in the 85th minute.

== External ==
- Gabe Gissie at USL Championship
- Sacramento Republic FC profile
