= Adam Jahn =

American soccer player (born 1991)

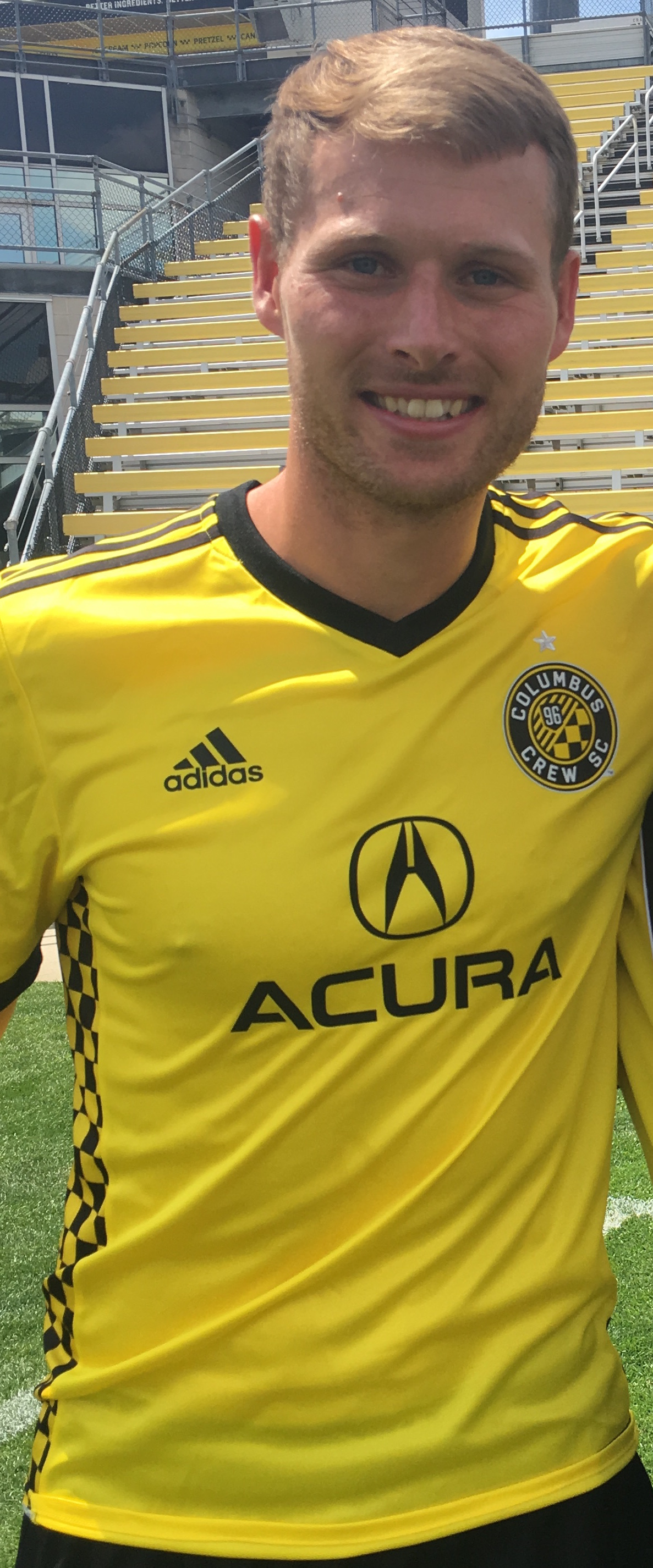
- Jahn with Columbus Crew SC in 2017

Personal information
- Full name: Adam Jahn
- Date of birth: January 5, 1991 (age 35)
- Place of birth: El Macero, California, U.S.
- Height: 1.90 m (6 ft 3 in)
- Position: Forward

Youth career
- 2000–2008: Davis Legacy

College career
| Years | Team | Apps | (Gls) |
| 2009–2012 | Stanford Cardinal | 73 | (24) |

Senior career*
| Years | Team | Apps | (Gls) |
| 2010 | Washington Crossfire | 5 | (3) |
| 2013–2016 | San Jose Earthquakes | 62 | (6) |
| 2014 | → Sacramento Republic (loan) | 17 | (6) |
| 2016 | → Sacramento Republic (loan) | 11 | (2) |
| 2016–2018 | Columbus Crew SC | 41 | (6) |
| 2018 | → OKC Energy (loan) | 10 | (3) |
| 2019 | Phoenix Rising | 33 | (17) |
| 2020–2021 | Atlanta United | 21 | (3) |
| 2021 | → Orange County SC (loan) | 1 | (0) |

International career
| 2008–2009 | United States U18 | 6 | (5) |
- * Club domestic league appearances and goals as of November 8, 2021

Adam Jahn (born January 5, 1991) is an American former professional soccer player who played as a forward.

== Career ==
=== Early and collegiate ===
The son of Tom and Barbara, Jahn attended Jesuit High School in Carmichael, California, where he played soccer. He was named the Gatorade California Player of the Year in 2007 and 2008, in addition to being named a NSCAA All-American. He continued his education and soccer career at Stanford University, where he played all four years, scoring 24 goals and 12 assists. In his senior year, he was named to the All-Pac-12 first team.

Jahn played his youth club soccer at the Davis Legacy Soccer Club from 2000 through 2008.

=== San Jose Earthquakes ===
Jahn was selected as the 15th pick in the 2013 MLS Supplemental Draft by his local team, the San Jose Earthquakes, on January 22, 2013. On March 3, 2013, Jahn made his debut for the Earthquakes at Buck Shaw Stadium in the opening game of the season by coming on as a substitute in the 83rd minute for Ty Harden. San Jose lost the match 2–0 against Real Salt Lake. He scored his first professional goal in his next game against the New York Red Bulls. The goal came in the form of a right-footed volley off a far-post cross from Sam Cronin in the 83rd minute to tie the game. On a subsequent play, he headed the ball into the hand of Roy Miller, setting up the winning penalty kick by Chris Wondolowski to complete a 2–1 comeback victory.

=== Columbus Crew SC ===
On July 30, 2016, Jahn was traded to Columbus Crew SC in exchange for Targeted Allocation Money. He made his club debut the next day, coming on as a substitute in a 3–0 loss to Toronto FC. Jahn scored his first Crew SC goal in a 2–1 loss to the Philadelphia Union, after coming on as a substitute with 30 minutes to play.

At the end of the 2018 season, the club declined Jahn's contract option; he departed Columbus with seven goals from 46 total appearances.

=== Phoenix Rising FC ===
Jahn signed with Phoenix Rising FC on December 10, 2018. Jahn scored 17 goals, which was 5th in the league, and added 5 assists.

=== Atlanta United FC ===
On January 22, 2020, Jahn was acquired by Atlanta United. The transfer fee was undisclosed, but it was reportedly $100,000. Jahn was waived by Atlanta on February 2, 2021.

=== Orange County SC ===
On February 22, 2021, Jahn joined USL Championship side Orange County SC, technically on loan from Atlanta United, although he had recently been waived by the MLS club.

== Career statistics ==
As of September 5, 2020

| Club | Season | League | | | Playoffs (Note: Includes the USL Cup Playoffs and MLS Cup Playoffs) | | Cup | | Continental | | Total | |
| Club | Season | Division | Apps | Goals | Apps | Goals | Apps | Goals | Apps | Goals | Apps | Goals |
|---|---|---|---|---|---|---|---|---|---|---|---|---|
| Washington Crossfire | 2010 | PDL | 5 | 3 | – | | – | | – | | 5 | 3 |
| San Jose Earthquakes | 2013 | MLS | 22 | 4 | – | | 1 | 0 | 2 | 0 | 25 | 4 |
| San Jose Earthquakes | 2014 | MLS | 4 | 0 | – | | 0 | 0 | – | | 4 | 0 |
| San Jose Earthquakes | 2015 | MLS | 26 | 1 | – | | 1 | 0 | – | | 27 | 1 |
| San Jose Earthquakes | 2016 | MLS | 10 | 1 | – | | 1 | 0 | – | | 11 | 1 |
| San Jose Earthquakes | Total | | 62 | 6 | 0 | 0 | 3 | 0 | 2 | 0 | 67 | 6 |
| Sacramento Republic (loan) | 2014 | USL | 17 | 6 | 3 | 1 | 0 | 0 | – | | 20 | 7 |
| Sacramento Republic (loan) | 2016 | USL | 11 | 2 | 0 | 0 | 0 | 0 | – | | 11 | 2 |
| Sacramento Republic (loan) | Total | | 28 | 8 | 3 | 1 | 0 | 0 | 0 | 0 | 31 | 9 |
| Columbus Crew SC | 2016 | MLS | 12 | 5 | – | | 0 | 0 | – | | 12 | 5 |
| Columbus Crew SC | 2017 | MLS | 21 | 1 | 3 | 0 | 1 | 0 | – | | 25 | 1 |
| Columbus Crew SC | 2018 | MLS | 8 | 0 | 0 | 0 | 1 | 1 | – | | 9 | 1 |
| Columbus Crew SC | Total | | 41 | 6 | 3 | 0 | 2 | 1 | 0 | 0 | 46 | 7 |
| OKC Energy (loan) | 2018 | USL | 10 | 3 | – | | 0 | 0 | – | | 10 | 3 |
| OKC Energy (loan) | Total | | 10 | 3 | - | | | | | | 10 | 3 |
| Phoenix Rising | 2019 | USLC | 33 | 17 | 0 | 0 | 1 | 1 | – | | 34 | 18 |
| Phoenix Rising | Total | | 33 | 17 | 0 | 0 | 1 | 1 | 0 | 0 | 34 | 18 |
| Atlanta United | 2020 | MLS | 8 | 2 | 0 | 0 | 0 | 0 | – | | 8 | 2 |
| Atlanta United | Total | | 14 | 2 | 0 | 0 | 0 | 0 | 0 | 0 | 14 | 2 |
| Career total | | | 188 | 42 | 6 | 1 | 6 | 2 | 2 | 0 | 202 | 45 |

== Honors ==
Sacramento Republic

- USL Cup: 2014

Phoenix Rising

- USL Championship Regular Season Title: 2019

Orange County SC

- USL Cup: 2021

Individual

- USL Championship All League First Team: 2019
