= Cristian González (footballer, born 1993) =

Mexican footballer (born 1993)

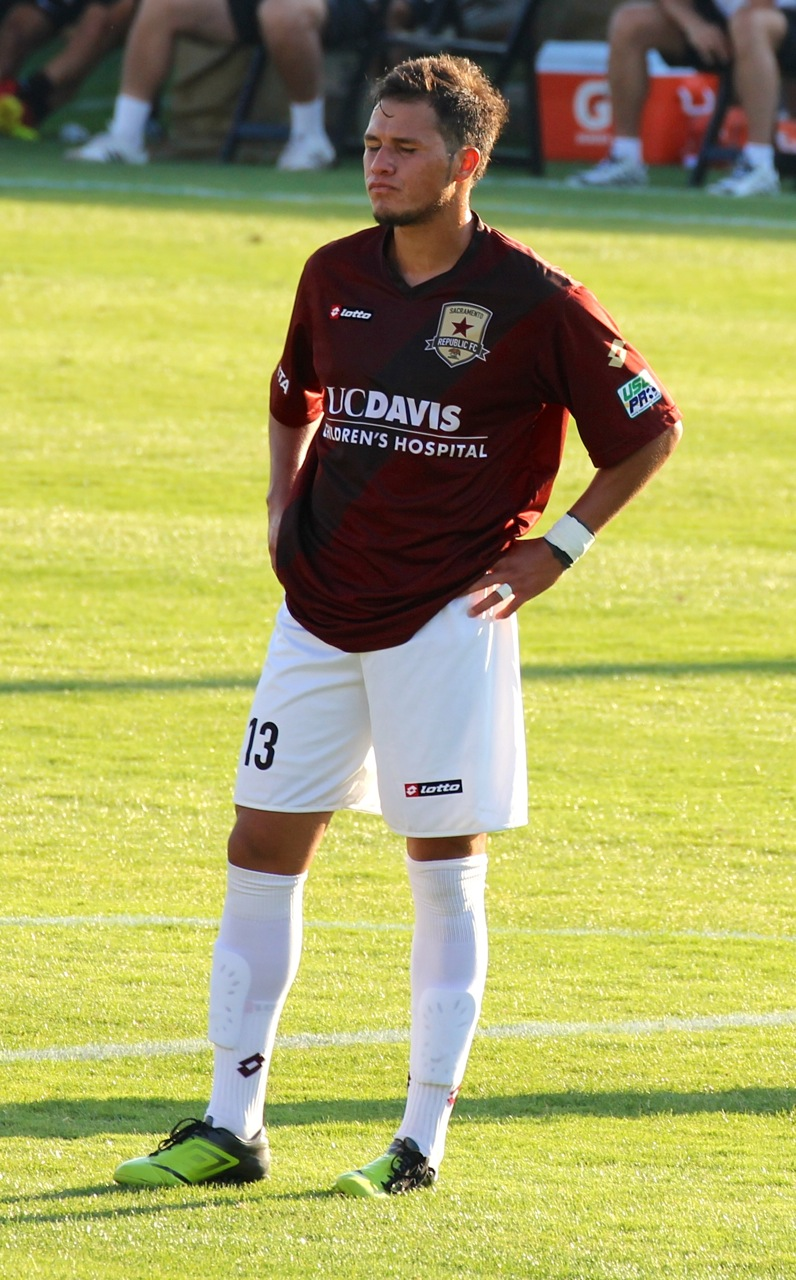

Personal information
- Full name: José Cristian González Herrera
- Date of birth: 22 March 1993 (age 33)
- Place of birth: Ario de Rosales, Michoacán, Mexico
- Height: 6 ft 0 in (1.83 m)
- Position: Defender

Youth career
- 2011–2013: Houston Dynamo

Senior career*
Years	Team	Apps	(Gls)
2014	Sacramento Republic	4	(0)
- * Club domestic league appearances and goals as of September 22, 2014

José Christian González (born March 22, 1993) is a Mexican footballer.

== Career ==
Gonzalez was a member of the Houston Dynamo Academy from 2011 to 2013, before transferring to USL Pro club Sacramento Republic in March 2014.

== Honours ==
Sacramento Republic

- USL Cup: 2014
