= George Fochive =

American soccer player (born 1992)

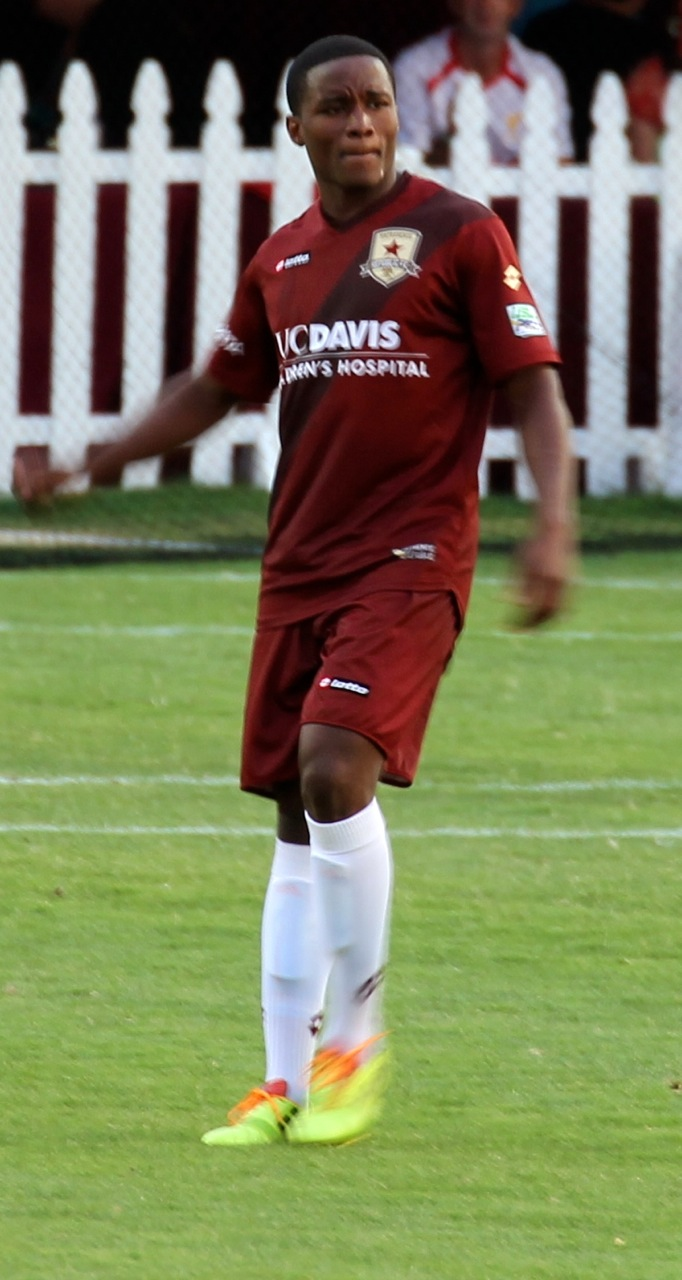
- Fochive with Sacramento Republic in 2014

Personal information
- Full name: George Ivan Fochive
- Date of birth: March 24, 1992 (age 34)
- Place of birth: Washington, D.C., United States
- Height: 1.75 m (5 ft 9 in)
- Position: Midfielder

College career
Years	Team	Apps	(Gls)
2010–2012	Hawaii Pacific Sea Warriors		
2012–2014	Connecticut Huskies		

Senior career*
Years	Team	Apps	(Gls)
2011–2012	Real Maryland Monarchs	16	(1)
2014–2015	Portland Timbers	15	(0)
2014	→ Sacramento Republic (loan)	11	(0)
2015	→ Portland Timbers 2 (loan)	8	(4)
2016–2018	Viborg FF	64	(3)
2019–2020	Hapoel Hadera	40	(3)
2020–2021	Hapoel Kfar Saba	17	(0)
2021	Bnei Yehuda	7	(1)
2021–2022	Portland Timbers	24	(2)
2022	Portland Timbers 2	5	(0)
- * Club domestic league appearances and goals as of September 23, 2022

George Ivan Fochive (born March 24, 1992) is an American former soccer player who played as a midfielder.

== Career ==
=== College and amateur ===
Of Cameroonian descent, Fochive spent ten years of his early life in France where he played boarding school soccer at Lycée Godefroy de Bouillon in Clermont-Ferrand. He started his college soccer career at Hawaii Pacific University in 2010, where he spent two years before transferring to UConn in 2012.

While at college, Fochive also appeared for USL PDL club Real Maryland Monarchs in 2011 and 2012.

=== Professional ===
Fochive was drafted in the third round of the 2014 MLS SuperDraft (39th overall) by the Portland Timbers, and was signed by the club in February 2014.

Fochive was loaned to Portland's USL Pro affiliate club Sacramento Republic and made his debut on April 27, 2014, in a 1–2 defeat to Harrisburg City Islanders.

In February 2016, Portland sold Fochive to Viborg FF of the Danish Superliga.

Fochive departed Viborg in December 2018.

On January 12, 2019, Fochive signed in the Israeli Premier League club Hapoel Hadera.

On July 16, 2020, Fochive signed in Hapoel Kfar Saba.

On June 8, 2021, Fochive signs for a second time with the Portland Timbers through 2022. Following the 2022 season, his contract option was declined by Portland.

== Honors ==
Portland Timbers

- MLS Cup: 2015
- Western Conference (playoffs): 2015
