= Michael Daly (soccer) =

American soccer player

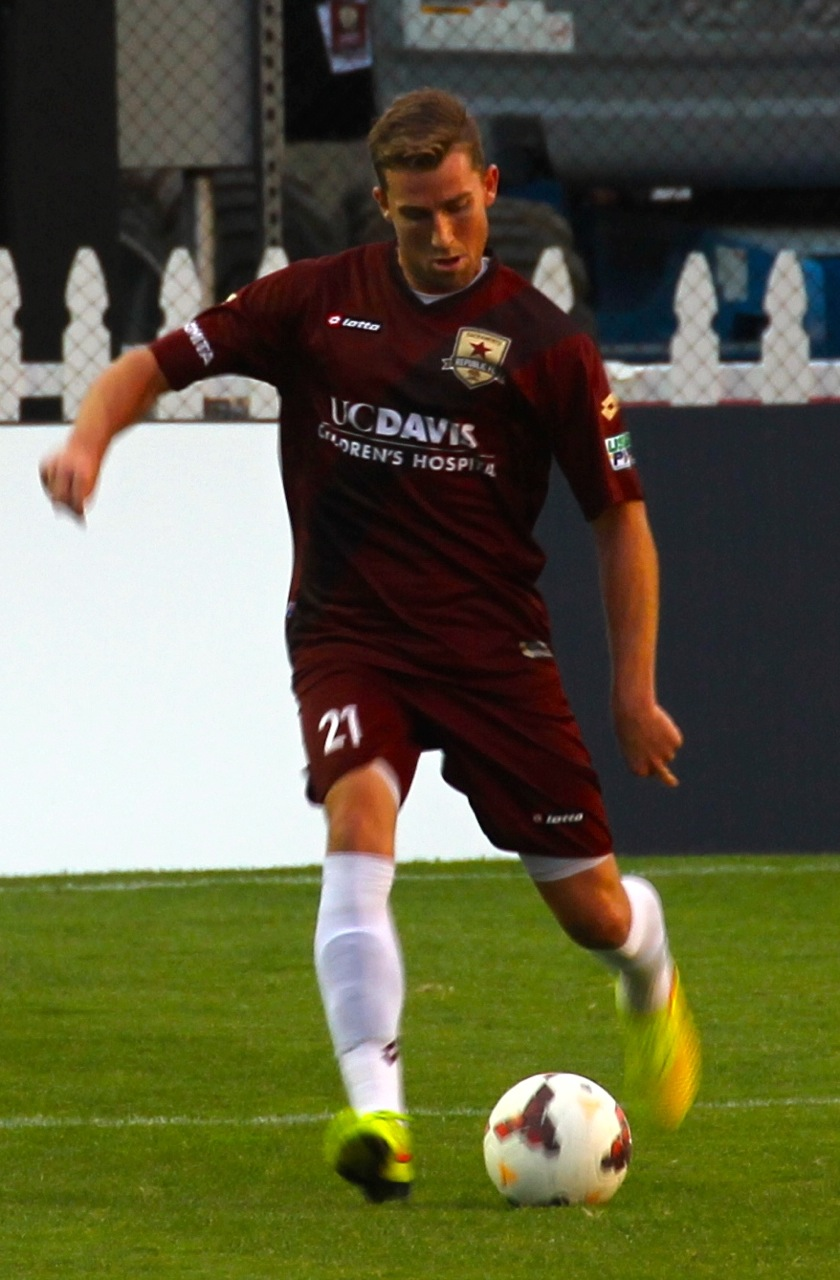

Personal information
- Date of birth: June 4, 1987 (age 39)
- Place of birth: Sonoma, California, United States
- Height: 6 ft 2 in (1.88 m)
- Position: Center back

Youth career
- 2010–2011: Cal State Los Angeles

Senior career*
Years	Team	Apps	(Gls)
2011–2012	Ventura County Fusion	30	(3)
2013	Wilmington Hammerheads	22	(0)
2014–2015	Sacramento Republic	56	(6)
2016	Bethlehem Steel	9	(1)
2016	→ Carolina RailHawks (loan)	6	(0)
2016	Carolina RailHawks	11	(0)
2017	Oklahoma City Energy	25	(1)
2018–2019	Fresno FC	59	(1)
- * Club domestic league appearances and goals as of October 25, 2019

Michael "Mickey" Daly (born June 4, 1987) is an American soccer player.

== Career ==
=== College ===
Daly played at California State University, Los Angeles where he made the 2009 NCAA Division II All America 1st team in 2009.

=== Professional ===
==== Wilmington Hammerheads FC ====
Daly signed his first professional contract with USL Pro club Wilmington Hammerheads in April 2013. He made his debut on April 29, 2013, in a 3–1 loss to Phoenix FC.

==== Sacramento Republic FC ====
Prior to the 2014 season, Daly was signed by Sacramento Republic FC for their inaugural season. Daly impressed during the 2014 season earning 33 appearances, scoring 4 goals, and earning two USL Team of the Week awards. Daly would win his first USL Championship with Sacramento defeating Harrisburg City Islanders 2-0 for the 2014 USL Pro Title.

The 2015 season would see Daly keep his starting place in the making 33 appearances and scoring twice. Sacramento would go on to make the playoffs for the second consecutive season, but lost out in the first round to eventual finalists LA Galaxy II.

==== Bethlehem Steel FC ====
On December 11, 2015, Daly signed with Bethlehem Steel FC. Daly would become an immediate starter for the club making 9 appearances and tallying 1 goal for Steel FC.

==== Carolina Railhawks ====
In July 2016, Bethlehem Steel FC loaned Daly out to Carolina Railhawks for a one-month loan with the option to buy after. Impressing through 6 matches, the Railhawks exercised their purchase option in September 2016, making the transfer permanent.

==== OKC Energy ====
Daly signed with USL side OKC Energy FC on January 17, 2017.

==== Fresno FC ====
Daly signed with new USL club Fresno FC on December 5, 2017.

== Career statistics ==
As of 6 November 2016

Club performance			League		Cup		Continental		Total	
Club	Season	League	Apps	Goals	Apps	Goals	Apps	Goals	Apps	Goals
Wilmington Hammerheads FC	2013	USL Pro	22	0	0	0	0	0	22	0
Sacramento Republic FC	2014	USL Pro	30	4	3	0	0	0	33	4
Sacramento Republic FC	2015	USL	26	2	3	0	0	0	29	2
Bethlehem Steel FC	2016	USL	9	1	0	0	0	0	9	1
Carolina Railhawks (loan)	2016	NASL	6	0	0	0	0	0	6	0
Carolina Railhawks	2016	NASL	11	0	0	0	0	0	11	0
Career statistics			104	7	6	0	0	0	110	7
