= Dakota Collins =

American soccer player (born 1991)

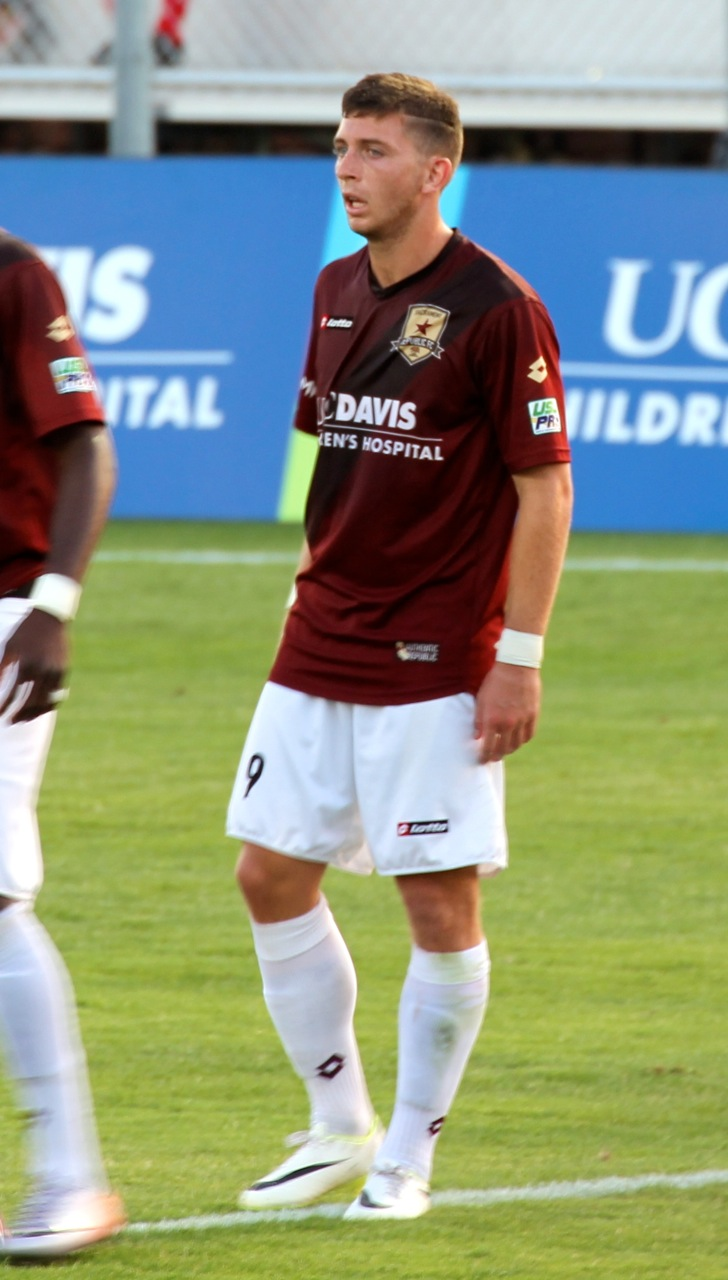
- Collins with Sacramento Republic

Personal information
- Full name: Dakota J. Collins
- Date of birth: 15 August 1991 (age 35)
- Place of birth: Santa Barbara, California, United States
- Height: 5 ft 10 in (1.78 m)
- Position: Forward

Team information
- Current team: Orange County FC
- Number: 11

College career
| Years | Team | Apps | (Gls) |
| 2009–2010 | UCLA Bruins | | |
| 2011–2012 | Cal Poly Mustangs | | |

Senior career*
| Years | Team | Apps | (Gls) |
| 2009 | Orange County Blue Star | 7 | (0) |
| 2012 | Des Moines Menace | 3 | (0) |
| 2013 | FC Tucson | 13 | (3) |
| 2014 | Sacramento Republic | 14 | (2) |
| 2015–2017 | NK HAŠK | 5 | (1) |
| 2018– | Orange County FC | 24 | (17) |
- * Club domestic league appearances and goals as of 13 May 2019

Dakota J. Collins (born August 15, 1991) is an American soccer player who plays as a forward for Orange County FC in the National Premier Soccer League.

== Career ==
Collins was born in Santa Barbara, California. He played four years of college soccer, two years with UCLA Bruins and a further two with the Cal Poly Mustangs. During his time in college, he also spent the 2009 season with Orange County Blue Star and the 2012 season with Des Moines Menace in the USL PDL.

After graduating, Collins spent 2013 with USL PDL club FC Tucson, where he scored 3 goals in 13 appearances.

Collins signed his first professional contract in March 2014, joining USL Pro club Sacramento Republic.

At the beginning of 2015, he moved to Croatia, joining third-tier NK HAŠK from Zagreb.
