= Ivan Mirković =

Serbian footballer (born 1987)

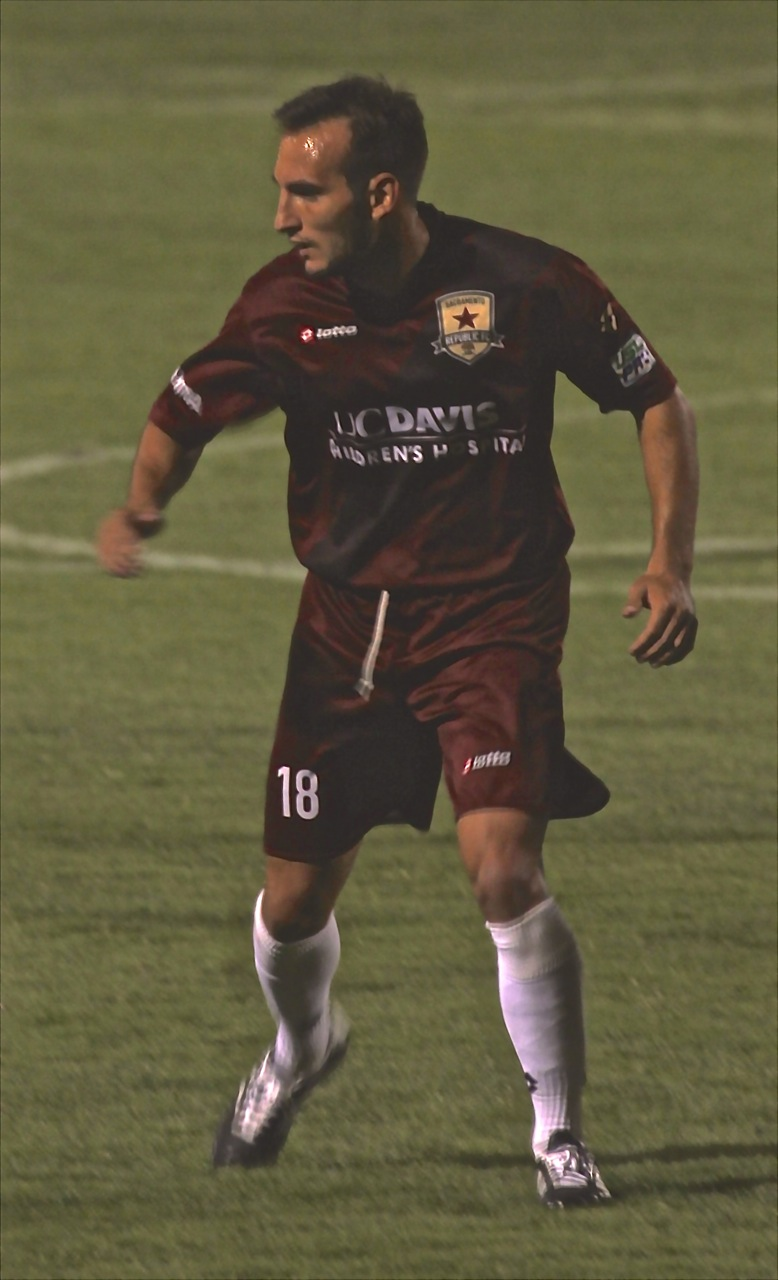

Personal information
- Full name: Ivan Mirković
- Date of birth: 25 March 1987 (age 39)
- Place of birth: Belgrade, SFR Yugoslavia
- Height: 5 ft 6 in (1.68 m)
- Position: Defensive midfielder

Youth career
- Car Konstantin

College career
Years	Team	Apps	(Gls)
2010–2011	Oxnard Condors		
2012–2013	Fresno Pacific Sunbirds	42	(1)

Senior career*
Years	Team	Apps	(Gls)
2011–2013	Ventura County Fusion	15	(0)
2014–2015	Sacramento Republic	58	(1)
2016	Orange County Blues	25	(0)
2017	Saint Louis FC	18	(0)
2018	Tulsa Roughnecks	26	(0)
2019	Fresno Football Club	0	(0)

Managerial career
- 2019: Fresno Football Club
- 2020-2024: Sacramento Republic FC Academy
- 2024: Las Vegas Lights
- * Club domestic league appearances and goals as of 17:46, 17 October 2018 (UTC)

Ivan Mirković (Serbian Cyrillic: Иван Мирковић; born 25 March 1987) is a former Serbian footballer who played as a midfielder.

== Career ==
=== Youth and amateur ===
Mirković played four years of college soccer, two years at Oxnard College and two years at Fresno Pacific University. During his time at Fresno Pacific University, Mirkovic earned third-team all-PacWest honors as a defender, named NCCAA Tournament Defensive MVP and named to NCCAA All-West Region team as a defender in 2012. In 2013, Mirkovic was named the PacWestDefender of the Year in November and was selected to the All-Pac West Conference First Team. Mirkovic was also honored to the NSCAA (National Soccer Coaches Association of America) All-West Region team.

In 2011 through 2013, Mirković also played for Ventura County Fusion in the USL PDL.

=== Professional ===
Mirković signed his first professional contract in March 2014, joining USL Pro club Sacramento Republic. After winning the USL Pro title, Ivan Mirkovic was re-signed on a new contract. On 1 April, Ivan Mirković was transferred to Orange County SC. The terms of the transaction have not been disclosed.

On 10 November 2016 Saint Louis FC has come to terms with midfielder Ivan Mirković and goalkeeper Devala Gorrick, pending USL and the United States Soccer Federation approval.

Mirković joined Tulsa Roughnecks for the 2018 season on February 2, 2018 on undisclosed transfer fee.

On 24 January 2019 Fresno FC announced new additions to coaching staff for 2019 adding Ivan Mirković as a player/coach, who will also assisting as head of analysis.

On 24 November 2023 Sacramento Republic FC announced Ivan Mirković will join the U.S. U-15 Youth National Team staff for its trip to the UEFA Development Tournament in Lisbon, Portugal.

On 08 March 2024 Las Vegas Lights FC announced it has added three staff members to Head Coach Dennis Sanchez’s staff: assistant coaches Gerson Echeverry and Ivan Mirković as well as goalkeeper coach Armando Quezada.
