= Drew Ruggles =

American soccer player (born 1992)

Personal information
- Full name: Drew Christian Ruggles
- Date of birth: July 28, 1992 (age 34)
- Place of birth: Fayetteville, North Carolina, United States
- Height: 6 ft 1 in (1.85 m)
- Position: Defender

Team information
- Current team: San Diego Sockers
- Number: 8

College career
Years	Team	Apps	(Gls)
2010–2013	Georgia Southern Eagles	48	(6)

Senior career*
Years	Team	Apps	(Gls)
2013	Michigan Bucks	10	(1)
2014	Wilmington Hammerheads	21	(1)
2014–2015	Baltimore Blast (indoor)	10	(3)
2015	Rochester Rhinos	7	(0)
2015–2019	Milwaukee Wave (indoor)	70	(27)
2016–2018	Milwaukee Torrent		
2019–2023	Florida Tropics (indoor)	69	(47)
2021–2022	Tropics SC		
2023–	San Diego Sockers (indoor)	23	(8)
- * Club domestic league appearances and goals as of November 27, 2024

Drew Christian Ruggles (born July 28, 1992) is an American soccer player who currently plays for the San Diego Sockers in the Major Arena Soccer League.

== Career ==
=== College and amateur ===
Ruggles played three years of college soccer at Georgia Southern University between 2010 and 2013. While at college, Ruggles also appeared for USL PDL club Michigan Bucks during their 2013 season.

Ruggles also appeared for the Georgia Southern Eagles football team in 2012.

=== Professional ===
Ruggles signed his first professional contract with USL Pro club Wilmington Hammerheads on April 4, 2014.

Ruggles was released by Wilmington at the end of the 2014, later signing with USL club Rochester Rhinos on March 26, 2015.

After winning the 2018–19 Major Arena Soccer League championship with the Milwaukee Wave, Ruggles joined Florida Tropics SC on 21 May 2019.
