= Max Alvarez =

American soccer player

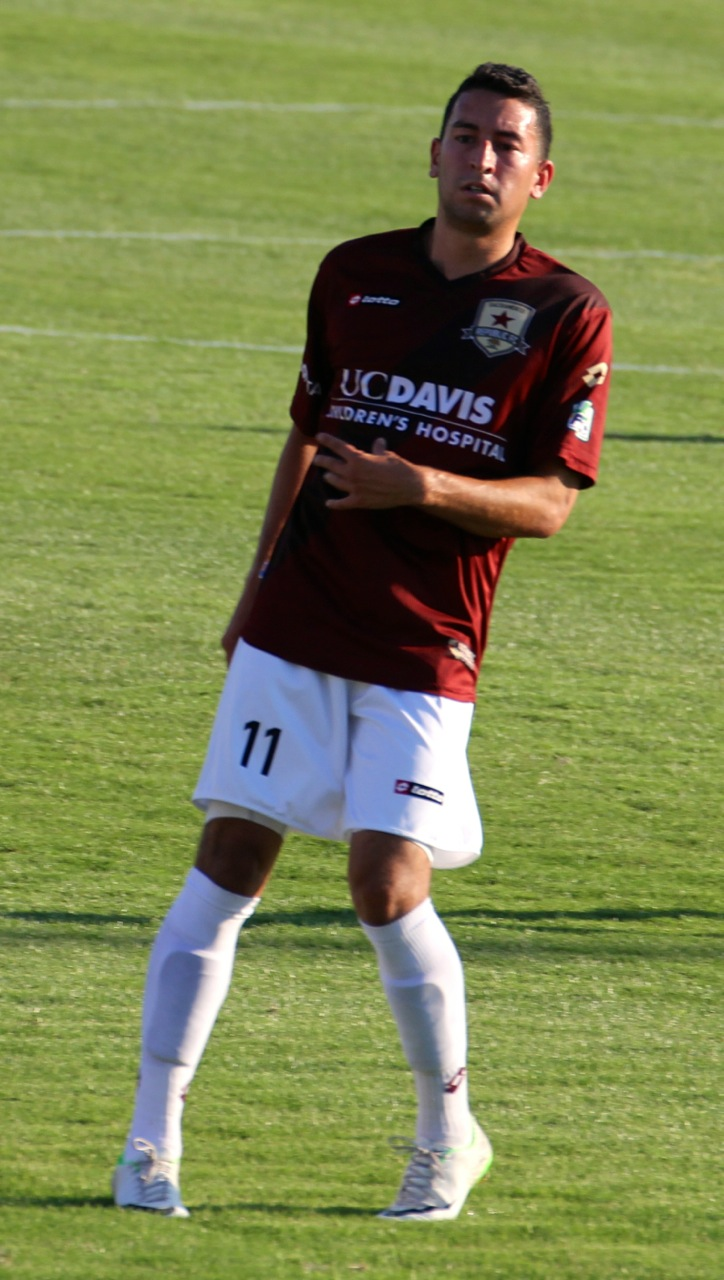

Personal information
- Date of birth: June 16, 1991 (age 35)
- Place of birth: Napa, California, United States
- Height: 5 ft 10 in (1.78 m)
- Position: Forward

Youth career
- 2009–2012: Sacramento State Hornets

Senior career*
Years	Team	Apps	(Gls)
2012	FC Tucson	15	(1)
2013	Sacramento Gold		
2014–2016	Sacramento Republic	53	(2)
2017	Saint Louis FC	14	(0)
- * Club domestic league appearances and goals as of 11:08, 20 October 2017 (UTC)

Max Alvarez (born June 16, 1991) is an American soccer player.

== Career ==
=== Youth and amateur ===
Alvarez played four years of college soccer at Sacramento State University. The forward was voted second team freshman All-America by Soccer America in 2009 by leading MPSF in scoring and points (23 points). In 2012, Alvarez played for FC Tucson in the USL PDL and led them to a play-off appearance.

=== Professional ===
Alvarez signed his first professional contract in March 2014, joining USL Pro club Sacramento Republic. Then in April 2017 he signed with Saint Louis FC and scored his first goal with the club in his first game with them.

== Honors ==
Sacramento Republic

- USL Cup: 2014
