= Gabriel González (Mexican footballer) =

Mexican footballer (born 1988)

Personal information
- Full name: Gabriel R. González
- Date of birth: 15 February 1988 (age 38)
- Place of birth: Nayarit, Mexico
- Height: 1.88 m (6 ft 2 in)
- Position: Midfielder

Youth career
- 2006–2007: Oxnard College
- 2008–2009: California Baptist Lancers

Senior career*
Years	Team	Apps	(Gls)
2007	Ventura County Fusion	3	(0)
2010	Fresno Fuego	14	(7)
2011–2012	Ventura County Fusion	13	(2)
2013–2014	Orange County Blues	47	(5)
2015	Sacramento Republic	6	(0)
- * Club domestic league appearances and goals as of June 15, 2015

Gabriel R. González (born 15 February 1988) is a Mexican footballer who played as a midfielder.

== Career ==
After spending time in the USL PDL with Ventura County Fusion Gonzalez signed for the Los Angeles Blues of the USL Pro. On 2 April 2013 Gonzalez made his debut for the Blues against new expansion franchise VSI Tampa Bay FC in which he came on in the 78th minute as the Blues lost the match 1–0.

== Career statistics ==
=== Club ===
Statistics accurate as of 7 April 2013

Club	Season	League		Cup		League Cup		CONCACAF		Total	
Club	Season	Apps	Goals	Apps	Goals	Apps	Goals	Apps	Goals	Apps	Goals
Los Angeles Blues	2013	23	4	—	—	1	0	—	—	24	4
Career total		1	0	0	0	0	0	0	0	1	0
