= Rodrigo López (soccer, born 1987) =

Professional soccer player

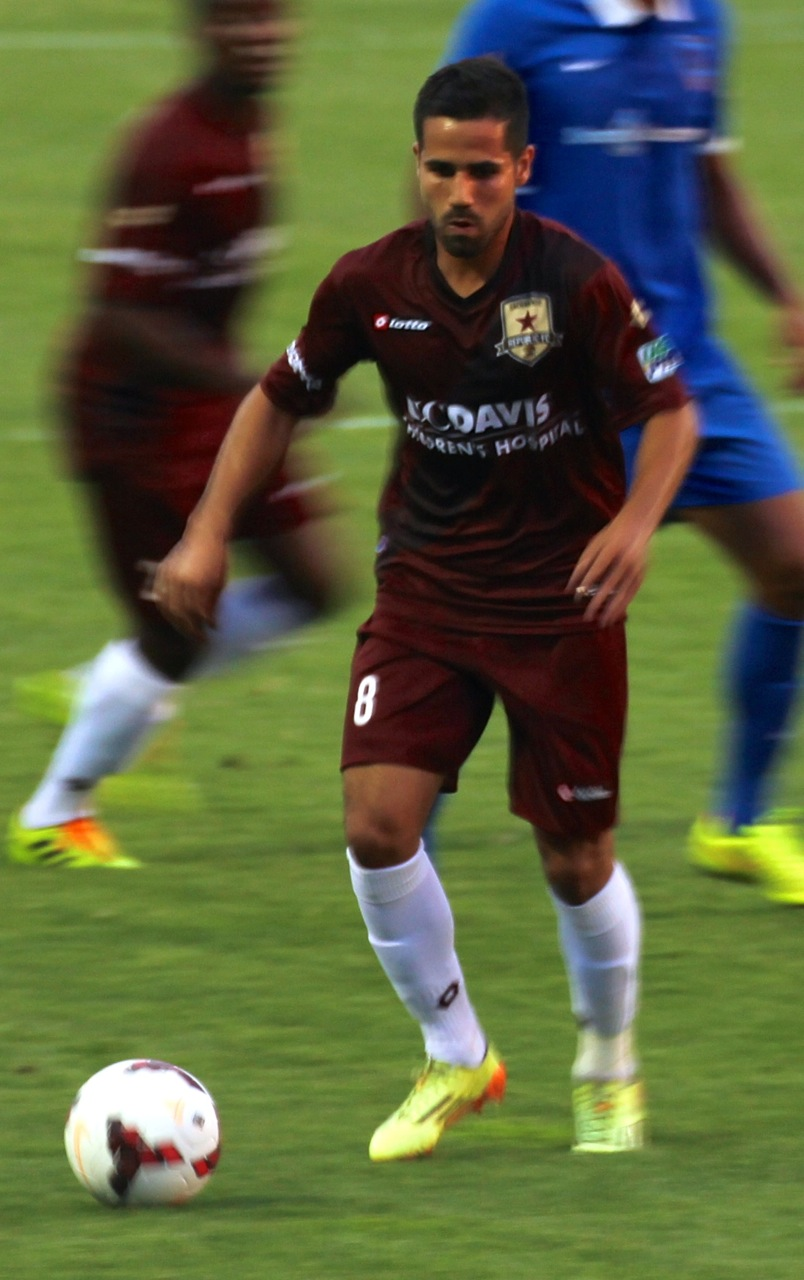
- López with Sacramento Republic in 2014

Personal information
- Full name: Rodrigo López Alvarez
- Date of birth: May 10, 1987 (age 39)
- Place of birth: Guadalajara, Mexico
- Height: 1.72 m (5 ft 8 in)
- Position: Midfielder

Youth career
- 2003–2004: Guadalajara

Senior career*
Years	Team	Apps	(Gls)
2005–2007	Chivas USA	8	(0)
2008	Ventura County Fusion	12	(3)
2008–2009	Cuervos Negros de Zapotlanejo	28	(7)
2009	Querétaro		
2009	Ventura County Fusion	3	(2)
2009–2010	Portland Timbers	23	(0)
2011	Portland Timbers	0	(0)
2012	Ventura County Fusion	11	(1)
2012	Orlando City	8	(1)
2013	Los Angeles Blues	23	(2)
2014–2015	Sacramento Republic	54	(23)
2016–2018	Celaya	76	(9)
2017	→ Toluca (loan)	9	(0)
2019	Veracruz	10	(0)
2020	Sacramento Republic	13	(1)
2021	Rio Grande Valley	31	(5)
2022–2025	Sacramento Republic	73	(13)

International career
2005	United States U18	3	(1)
2006–2007	United States U20	6	(0)
- * Club domestic league appearances and goals as of October 30, 2025

Rodrigo López Alvarez (born May 10, 1987) is a professional soccer player who plays as a midfielder. Born in Mexico, he represented the United States national under-20 team.

== Career ==
=== Youth ===
López grew up in Santa Barbara, California, and began his career in 2003 when he joined the Chivas de Guadalajara youth system, where he played for a year and a half.

=== Professional ===
López turned professional when he was signed to a developmental contract by Chivas USA on July 7, 2005, and remained with the team until he was waived in 2007 having made eight MLS appearances.

López dropped down a level to play a season with Ventura County Fusion in the USL Premier Development League in 2008, and then played for both Cuervos Negros de Zapotlanejo and Querétaro in Mexico, before returning to Ventura County in the summer of 2009 to help the Fusion win the 2009 PDL Championship, receiving MVP honors.

Following the conclusion of the PDL season López signed with the Portland Timbers, helping them to the 2009 USL First Division regular season title.

On March 17, 2011, Lopez was added to the Portland Timbers MLS roster, along with Chris Taylor and Spencer Thompson. Following the 2011 season, the Timbers announced that they would not be bringing López back for the 2012 season. Lopez entered the 2011 MLS Re-Entry Draft but was not selected and became a free agent.

On December 2, 2013, Sacramento Republic FC of USL Pro announced López as their first signing. Was a USL PRO MVP finalist and a First Team All-USL PRO Selection. Was named to the USL PRO Team of the Week in weeks 9, 14, 19 and 24 and was the Player of the Week in week 14. Was also named USL PRO Playoffs MVP.

On October 8, 2015, López announced that he would not be returning for Sacramento Republic FC's 2016 season.

On January 3, 2020 Sacramento Republic FC announced the return of López for the 2020 season.

Following his release from Sacramento at the end of the 2020 season, López moved to Rio Grande Valley FC on April 15, 2021. On January 18, 2022, López was transferred back to Sacramento Republic.

Following the 2022 U.S. Open Cup, he was named Player of the Tournament.

== Personal ==
Although born in Mexico, López's family moved to the United States when he was two years old, and he holds dual-citizenship with Mexico and the United States. He also has a brother and sister, Carmen López and Álvaro López.

== Honors ==
Ventura County Fusion

- USL Premier Development League Champions: 2009

Orlando City

- USL Professional Division Commissioner's Cup: 2012

Sacramento Republic

- USL Cup: 2014

Individual

- USL Championship All League First Team (2): 2014, 2022
- USL Championship All League Second Team: 2015
