= 2014 USL Pro season =

28th season of third-division soccer league in the United States

USL Pro
- Season: 2014
- Champions: Sacramento Republic (1st Title)
- Commissioner's Cup: Orlando City SC (3rd Title)
- Matches: 210
- Goals: 585 (2.79 per match)
- Best Player: (Trinidad and Tobago) Kevin Molino Orlando City SC
- Top goalscorer: (Trinidad and Tobago) Kevin Molino Orlando City SC (20)
- Best goalkeeper: (United States) John McCarthy Rochester Rhinos
- Biggest home win: ORL 7, DDL 0 (August 31)
- Biggest away win: SAC 6, OCB 1 (August 17)
- Highest scoring: HAR 5, DDL 3 (May 17)
- Longest winning run: 8 ORL (May 17 – July 12)
- Longest unbeaten run: 21 RIC (April 19 – August 16)
- Longest losing run: 6 OKC (April 15 – May 25) (August 9 – September 4); OCB (July 7 – August 8)
- Highest attendance: 20,231 SAC vs. HAR (April 26); SAC vs. LAG (May 17); SAC vs. AZU (Jun 7)
- Lowest attendance: 213 DDL vs. CHB (May 4)
- Total attendance: 610,351
- Average attendance: 3,114

The 2014 USL Pro season was the fourth USL Pro season and the 28th season of third-division soccer in the United States.

== Teams ==
Antigua Barracuda FC and VSI Tampa Bay FC folded following the 2013 season and were replaced by Sacramento Republic FC and Oklahoma City Energy FC. On January 29, 2014, the Los Angeles Galaxy of MLS announced that they would be fielding a USL Pro team, the LA Galaxy II. The Los Angeles Blues were rebranded Orange County Blues FC on February 5, 2014. Arizona United SC replaced Phoenix FC on March 13, 2014.

Orlando City Soccer Club spent their final season in USL Pro playing at ESPN Wide World of Sports Complex on the campus of Walt Disney World Resort in Kissimmee, Florida. This is due to the closure of the Florida Citrus Bowl Stadium, their home for their first three seasons, for remodeling during 2014. The following season Orlando City moved up to Major League Soccer.

=== Stadiums and Locations ===
Locations of teams for the 2014 USL PRO season

Team	Location	Stadium	Capacity
Arizona United SC	Peoria, Arizona	Peoria Sports Complex	11,333
Charleston Battery	Charleston, South Carolina	Blackbaud Stadium	5,100
Charlotte Eagles	Charlotte, North Carolina	Dickson Field	2,500
Dayton Dutch Lions	West Carrollton, Ohio	DOC Stadium	3,000
Harrisburg City Islanders	Harrisburg, Pennsylvania	Skyline Sports Complex	5,000
LA Galaxy II	Carson, California	StubHub Center Track and Field Stadium	2,000
Oklahoma City Energy FC	Oklahoma City, Oklahoma	Pribil Field	4,000
Orange County Blues FC	Irvine, California	Anteater Stadium	2,500
Orlando City	Lake Buena Vista, Florida	ESPN Sports Complex	5,300
Pittsburgh Riverhounds	Pittsburgh, Pennsylvania	Highmark Stadium	3,500
Richmond Kickers	Richmond, Virginia	City Stadium	22,000
Rochester Rhinos	Rochester, New York	Sahlen's Stadium	13,768
Sacramento Republic FC	Sacramento, California	Bonney Field	8,000
Wilmington Hammerheads	Wilmington, North Carolina	Legion Stadium	6,000

=== Personnel and kits ===
Note: Flags indicate national team as has been defined under FIFA eligibility rules. Players may hold more than one non-FIFA nationality.

Team	Manager	Captain	Kit supplier	Shirt sponsor
Arizona United SC	(United States) Michael Dellorusso	(United States) Matt Kassel	Lotto	Abrazo Health Care
Charleston Battery	(United States) Michael Anhaeuser	(Republic of Ireland) Colin Falvey	Nike	SPARC/Teamphoria!
Charlotte Eagles	(United States) Mark Steffens	(United States) Eric Reed	Nike	Powerade
Dayton Dutch Lions	(England) Matt Weston	(United States) Joel DeLass	Nike	Dayton Outpatient Center
Harrisburg City Islanders	(United States) Bill Becher	(United States) Jason Pelletier	Adidas	Capital Blue Cross
LA Galaxy II	(United States) Curt Onalfo	(United States) Jack McBean	Adidas	Herbalife
Oklahoma City Energy	(Denmark) Jimmy Nielsen	(United States) Michael Thomas	Admiral	First Fidelity Bank
Orange County Blues FC	(Iran) Dariush Yazdani	(Scotland) Allan Russell	Nike	Sports 1 Marketing
Orlando City	(England) Adrian Heath	(United States) Rob Valentino	Lotto	Orlando Health
Pittsburgh Riverhounds	(Croatia) Nikola Katic	(Netherlands) Collins John	Nike	#1 Cochran
Richmond Kickers	(England) Leigh Cowlishaw	(Uganda) Henry Kalungi	Adidas	Health Diagnostic Laboratory
Rochester Rhinos	(United States) Bob Lilley	(United States) Troy Roberts	Admiral	Bimbo Bakeries USA
Sacramento Republic	(United States) Preki	(Mexico) Rodrigo López	Lotto	UC Davis Children's Hospital
Wilmington Hammerheads	(United States) Carson Porter	(Scotland) Tom Parratt	Nike	New Hanover Regional Medical Center

=== MLS-USL Pro Alliance ===
Each USL PRO team will compete in two additional inter-league games against 2014 MLS Reserve League opponents in a "geographically influenced unbalanced schedule". The inter-league games will count in both the official USL PRO and MLS Reserve League standings.

The following teams will affiliate:

- Columbus Crew — Dayton Dutch Lions
- D.C. United — Richmond Kickers
- Houston Dynamo — Pittsburgh Riverhounds
- Los Angeles Galaxy — Los Angeles Galaxy II
- New England Revolution — Rochester Rhinos
- Philadelphia Union — Harrisburg City Islanders
- Portland Timbers — Sacramento Republic FC
- San Jose Earthquakes — Sacramento Republic FC
- Sporting Kansas City — Orlando City & Oklahoma City
- Toronto FC — Wilmington Hammerheads
- Vancouver Whitecaps FC — Charleston Battery

USL Pro teams compiled a 14 Win, 5 Tie and 9 Loss record against MLS Reserve Teams in 2014.

=== Managerial changes ===
Team	Outgoing manager	Position in table	Incoming manager	Date of appointment
Oklahoma City Energy FC	Expansion team		(Denmark) Jimmy Nielsen	December 20, 2013
Sacramento Republic FC	Expansion team		(United States) Preki	July 15, 2013
LA Galaxy II	Expansion team		(United States) Curt Onalfo	January 29, 2014
Arizona United SC	Expansion team		(United States) Michael Dellorusso	March 28, 2014
Pittsburgh Riverhounds	(United States) Justin Evans	14th Place	(Croatia) Nikola Katic (Interim)	May 19, 2014
Dayton Dutch Lions	(Netherlands) Sid van Druenen	14th Place	(England) Matt Weston	August 7, 2014
Wilmington Hammerheads	(England) David Irving	12th Place	(United States) Carson Porter (Interim)	August 21, 2014

== League table ==
Pos	Team	Pld	W	T	L	GF	GA	GD	Pts	Qualification
1	Orlando City (C)	28	19	5	4	56	24	+32	62	Commissioner's Cup, Playoffs
2	Sacramento Republic FC (A)	28	17	4	7	49	28	+21	55	Playoffs
3	LA Galaxy II (A)	28	15	6	7	54	38	+16	51	Playoffs
4	Richmond Kickers (A)	28	13	12	3	53	28	+25	51	Playoffs
5	Charleston Battery (A)	28	11	8	9	36	31	+5	41	Playoffs
6	Rochester Rhinos (A)	28	10	8	10	29	25	+4	38	Playoffs
7	Wilmington Hammerheads (A)	28	9	11	8	35	33	+2	38	Playoffs
8	Harrisburg City Islanders (A)	28	10	7	11	45	46	−1	37	Playoffs
9	Arizona United SC	28	10	5	13	32	47	−15	33 (Note: Arizona was deducted two points for fielding an ineligible player on June 21 against LA Galaxy II.)	
10	Oklahoma City Energy FC	28	9	5	14	32	37	−5	32	
11	Pittsburgh Riverhounds	28	9	5	14	35	49	−14	32	
12	Charlotte Eagles	28	9	4	15	33	40	−7	31	
13	Orange County Blues FC	28	9	1	18	31	54	−23	28	
14	Dayton Dutch Lions	28	6	4	18	28	63	−35	22	

Source: USL Pro official standings
Rules for classification: 1) points; 2) goal difference; 3) number of goals scored.
(A) Advances to USL Pro Playoffs; (C) Commissioner's Cup (best regular season record)

== Results table ==
Color Key: Home • Away • Win • Loss • Draw
Club	Match																											
Club	1	2	3	4	5	6	7	8	9	10	11	12	13	14	15	16	17	18	19	20	21	22	23	24	25	26	27	28
Arizona United SC (AZU)	OKC	SAC	LAG	CHE	RIC	HAR	ORL	CHV	OCB	SAC	DDL	ROC	LAG	SAC	OCB	LAG	OCB	OKC	OCB	WIL	CHB	SAC	LAG	OKC	PIT	OKC	SEA	PIT
Arizona United SC (AZU)	0–4	2–1	1–1	2–1	0–4	1–0	0–1	0–4	0–2	1–1	1–2	1–0	1–1	0–1	2–3	2–4	2–1	1–1	3–0	0–0	0–2	1–2	2–3	2–1	3–1	1–0	1–5	2–1
Charleston Battery (CHB)	ORL	RIC	ORL	NYR	PIT	ROC	HAR	DDL	WIL	WIL	PIT	ORL	LAG	CHE	HAR	CHE	RIC	RIC	AZU	MTL	ROC	DDL	OCB	ROC	OKC	SAC	PIT	HAR
Charleston Battery (CHB)	1–1	2–2	0–1	1–1	0–0	0–1	4–0	2–0	0–1	0–1	1–0	0–2	3–0	1–3	1–4	0–0	0–4	1–1	2–0	1–0	0–0	2–2	3–2	2–1	2–0	1–3	4–0	2–1
Charlotte Eagles (CHE)	DDL	RIC	CHI	WIL	AZU	LAG	OCB	ORL	RIC	WIL	OKC	OCB	CHB	HAR	ROC	DDL	CHB	SAC	PIT	DDL	WIL	ORL	RIC	ROC	ORL	PIT	MTL	HAR
Charlotte Eagles (CHE)	0–1	2–1	2–3	2–0	1–2	1–2	2–0	1–3	0–2	1–2	1–1	0–1	3–1	1–1	1–0	1–3	0–0	0–1	0–2	2–1	2–0	1–4	1–2	3–1	2–0	0–1	1–1	2–4
Dayton Dutch Lions (DDL)	NYR	CHE	ROC	HAR	RIC	CHB	LAG	HAR	SAC	ROC	OCB	LAG	AZU	ROC	ORL	PIT	PIT	CHE	HAR	CHE	OKC	HAR	CHB	WIL	RIC	COR	ORL	WIL
Dayton Dutch Lions (DDL)	0–3	1–0	1–1	1–0	1–5	0–2	1–1	3–5	1–2	0–1	3–4	1–5	2–1	0–2	0–2	1–0	1–2	3–1	1–3	1–2	0–3	0–1	2–2	2–1	1–1	1–2	0–7	0–4
Harrisburg City Islanders (HAR)	WIL	DDL	OCB	SAC	CHB	AZU	DDL	RIC	PIT	RIC	PIT	PIT	MTL	CHE	CHB	DDL	WIL	OKC	RIC	LAG	DDL	NYR	ORL	ORL	ROC	ROC	CHB	CHE
Harrisburg City Islanders (HAR)	0–0	0–1	1–4	2–1	0–4	0–1	5–3	2–3	1–1	0–1	3–1	0–0	0–1	1–1	4–1	3–1	0–0	3–3	1–2	3–1	1–0	3–1	3–2	1–3	2–2	1–4	1–2	4–2
LA Galaxy II (LAG)	OCB	SAC	OKC	SAC	OCB	AZU	OCB	CHE	DDL	SAC	OKC	SEA	DDL	ROC	CHB	AZU	ORL	AZU	OKC	OCB	HAR	PIT	AZU	OKC	WIL	RSL	RIC	SAC
LA Galaxy II (LAG)	3–1	1–1	4–2	0–3	3–1	1–1	3–0	2–1	1–1	1–2	5–0	1–0	5–1	1–2	0–3	1–1	0–3	4–2	1–0	4–0	1–3	1–3	3–2	1–0	3–3	1–0	1–1	2–1
Oklahoma City Energy FC (OKC)	OCB	LAG	AZU	DAL	ORL	ORL	OCB	RIC	LAG	NYR	WIL	CHE	SAC	ROC	SAC	PIT	AZU	LAG	HAR	DDL	OCB	SAC	AZU	LAG	AZU	CHB	SAC	OCB
Oklahoma City Energy FC (OKC)	2–0	2–4	4–0	0–1	1–2	1–3	0–1	1–4	0–5	1–0	2–2	1–1	2–0	0–0	2–0	2–0	1–1	0–1	3–3	3–0	1–0	1–2	1–2	0–1	0–1	0–2	0–1	1–0
Orange County Blues FC (OCB)	LAG	OKC	SAC	LAG	HAR	LAG	SAC	CHE	OKC	SEA	AZU	DDL	ORL	CHE	CHV	AZU	SAC	AZU	AZU	LAG	OKC	PIT	ROC	CHB	SAC	WIL	RIC	OKC
Orange County Blues FC (OCB)	1–3	0–2	2–1	1–3	4–1	0–3	1–2	0–2	1–0	0–1	2–0	4–3	1–4	1–0	2–1	3–2	1–2	1–2	0–3	0–4	0–1	0–1	1–0	2–3	1–6	1–2	1–1	0–1
Orlando City (ORL)	CHB	PIT	ROC	CHB	DAL	OKC	OKC	PIT	ROC	AZU	CHE	CHB	MTL	OCB	DDL	LAG	WIL	SAC	ROC	CHE	HAR	HAR	CHE	RIC	WIL	DDL	WIL	RIC
Orlando City (ORL)	1–1	1–1	3–1	1–0	3–2	2–1	3–1	1–0	1–1	1–0	3–1	2–0	2–1	4–1	2–0	3–0	2–0	0–0	0–1	4–1	2–3	3–1	0–2	3–2	1–3	7–0	0–0	1–0
Pittsburgh Riverhounds (PIT)	ORL	RIC	WIL	RIC	CHB	ORL	ROC	WIL	CHB	HAR	ROC	HAR	HAR	RIC	DDL	DDL	ROC	OKC	CHE	RSL	SAC	LAG	OCB	AZU	DAL	CHE	CHB	AZU
Pittsburgh Riverhounds (PIT)	1–1	1–3	3–4	2–2	0–0	0–1	0–1	1–5	0–1	1–1	3–2	1–3	0–0	1–3	0–1	2–1	2–0	0–2	2–0	5–2	0–5	3–1	1–0	1–3	3–1	1–0	0–4	1–2
Richmond Kickers (RIC)	CHB	PIT	CHE	PIT	DDL	ROC	AZU	OKC	CHI	CHE	ROC	HAR	HAR	WIL	PIT	CHB	RSL	SAC	CHB	CHB	HAR	WIL	CHE	DDL	ORL	OCB	LAG	ORL
Richmond Kickers (RIC)	2–2	3–1	1–2	2–2	5–1	1–1	4–0	4–1	0–0	2–0	0–0	3–2	1–0	2–2	3–1	1–1	0–0	2–1	4–0	1–1	2–1	3–1	2–1	1–1	2–3	1–1	1–1	0–1
Rochester Rhinos (ROC)	ORL	DDL	CHI	CHB	RIC	WIL	ORL	PIT	SAC	RIC	DDL	PIT	LAG	AZU	DDL	OKC	CHE	PIT	DAL	WIL	ORL	CHB	OCB	CHB	CHE	HAR	HAR	WIL
Rochester Rhinos (ROC)	1–3	1–1	2–0	1–0	1–1	0–0	1–1	1–0	0–1	0–0	1–0	2–3	2–1	0–1	2–0	0–0	0–1	0–2	3–0	0–1	1–0	0–0	0–1	1–2	1–3	2–2	4–1	2–0
Sacramento Republic FC (SAC)	LAG	CHV	OCB	LAG	AZU	HAR	OCB	LAG	ROC	DDL	AZU	OKC	COR	AZU	OKC	OCB	RIC	CHE	ORL	PIT	AZU	OKC	OCB	WIL	CHB	WIL	OKC	LAG
Sacramento Republic FC (SAC)	1–1	3–1	1–2	3–0	1–2	1–2	2–1	2–1	1–0	2–1	1–1	0–2	4–3	1–0	0–2	2–1	1–2	1–0	0–0	5–0	2–1	2–1	6–1	2–0	3–1	0–0	1–0	1–2
Wilmington Hammerheads (WIL)	HAR	PIT	CHE	ROC	CHB	CHB	PIT	CHE	OKC	RIC	CHI	RIC	ORL	HAR	ROC	AZU	CHE	RIC	DDL	NYR	SAC	OCB	LAG	ORL	SAC	ORL	DDL	ROC
Wilmington Hammerheads (WIL)	0–0	4–3	0–2	0–0	1–0	1–0	5–1	2–1	2–2	2–2	2–2	1–1	0–2	0–0	1–0	0–0	0–2	1–3	1–2	0–1	0–2	2–1	3–3	3–1	0–0	0–0	4–0	0–2
MLS Reserve Teams: Chicago Fire – CHI • Chivas USA – CHV • Colorado Rapids – COR • FC Dallas – DAL • Montreal Impact – MTL • New York Red Bulls – NYR • Real Salt Lake – RSL • Seattle Sounders FC – SEA

USL Pro published schedule and results.

== Playoffs ==
The 2014 USL Pro Playoffs included the top eight finishers in the table, with the quarterfinals (No. 1 vs. No. 8, No. 2 vs. No. 7, etc.) set for the weekend of September 12–14. The semifinals featuring the four remaining teams will be played the following weekend, with the 2014 USL PRO Championship set for the weekend of September 26–28. All playoff rounds feature a single-game knockout format and teams will not be re-seeded following each round.

Quarterfinals
1	Orlando City	0
8	Harrisburg City Islanders	1
4	Richmond Kickers (a.e.t.)	2
5	Charleston Battery	1
2	Sacramento Republic	4
7	Wilmington Hammerheads	1
3	LA Galaxy II	2
6	Rochester Rhinos	1

Semifinals
8	Harrisburg City Islanders	3
4	Richmond Kickers	2
2	Sacramento Republic	3
3	LA Galaxy II	2

USL Pro Championship
8	Harrisburg City Islanders	0
2	Sacramento Republic	2

September 13, 2014 QF	Richmond Kickers	2–1 (a.e.t.)	Charleston Battery	Richmond, Virginia
7:00 pm EDT	Martin 11'; Asante (yellow card) 72'; Lee (yellow card) 78'; Delicâte 117'; Shanosky (yellow card) 120'; Arbelaez (red card) 120'	Report	Kelly 64'; Adjetey (red card) 104'; Cuevas (red card) 120'	Stadium: City Stadium; Attendance: 2,711; Referee: Charles Carson

September 13, 2014 QF	Orlando City	0–1	Harrisburg City Islanders	Lake Buena Vista, Florida
7:30 pm EDT	Valentino (yellow card) 24'; Pulis (yellow card) 89'	Report	Hoppenot 40', (yellow card) 65'; Barril (yellow card) 79'; Derschang (red card) 90+'	Stadium: ESPN Sports Complex; Attendance: 4,855; Referee: Matthew Miscannon

September 13, 2014 QF	Sacramento Republic	4–1	Wilmington Hammerheads	Sacramento, California
7:30 pm PDT	Vuković (yellow card) 10' (goal) 40', 67'; Daly 64'; Jahn 88'	Report	Nicholson (yellow card) 42'; Ruggles (yellow card) 54'; Ochoa 58' (pen.)	Stadium: Bonney Field; Attendance: 8,000; Referee: Michael Zapata

September 13, 2014 QF	LA Galaxy II	2–1	Rochester Rhinos	Carson, California
7:30 pm PDT	Hoffman 29' (pen.); Stojkov (yellow card) 43'; Rugg (yellow card) 45' (goal) 63'; Garcia (yellow card) 45' (red card) 65'; Bli (yellow card) 90+'	Report	Rosenlund (yellow card) 16'; Banks 22'; Smith (yellow card) 90+'	Stadium: StubHub Center; Attendance: 2,478; Referee: Daniel Radford

September 20, 2014 SF	Richmond Kickers	2–3	Harrisburg City Islanders	Richmond, Virginia
7:00 pm EDT	Yeisley 32'; Shanosky 79'; Spitz (yellow card) 90+'	Report	Langley 27' (yellow card) 89'; Hardware 45'; Barril (yellow card) 64'; Bahner (yellow card) 71'; DiPrima 76'	Stadium: City Stadium; Attendance: 3,734; Referee: Mark Gorak

September 20, 2014 SF	Sacramento Republic	3–2	LA Galaxy II	Sacramento, California
7:30 pm PDT	López (yellow card) 57' (goal) 70' (pen.) 84' (pen.) 90+'; Klimenta (yellow card) 82'	Report	Rugg 26', 44'; Sorto (yellow card) 74'	Stadium: Bonney Field; Attendance: 8,000; Referee: Baboucarr Jallow

September 27, 2014 F	Sacramento Republic	2–0	Harrisburg City Islanders	Sacramento, California
7:30 pm PDT	Guzman 36'; Evans (yellow card) 90'; Stewart 90+'	Report; Report; Report; Report	Langley (yellow card) 46'	Stadium: Bonney Field; Attendance: 8,000; Referee: Ricardo Salazar

Championship Game MVP: (United States) Rodrigo López (SAC)

=== Average home attendances ===
Ranked from highest to lowest average attendance.

Team	GP	Total	High	Low	Average
Sacramento Republic FC	14	158,107	20,231	8,000	11,293
Rochester Rhinos	14	74,603	8,378	4,007	5,329
Orlando City SC	14	66,204	5,029	4,206	4,743
Oklahoma City Energy FC	14	52,975	4,722	2,813	3,784
Charleston Battery	14	52,786	5,415	2,214	3,770
Pittsburgh Riverhounds SC	14	37,606	3,902	2,005	2,686
Richmond Kickers	14	37,508	3,562	2,010	2,679
Arizona United SC	14	33,528	3,588	1,482	2,395
Wilmington Hammerheads	14	32,561	3,256	1,757	2,326
MLS Reserves	6	12,668	11,202	100	2,111
Harrisburg City Islanders	14	27,289	2,518	1,417	1,949
Orange County Blues FC	14	10,719	1,221	431	766
Charlotte Eagles	14	10,453	1,261	498	747
LA Galaxy II	14	8,359	1,259	127	597
Dayton Dutch Lions	14	7,455	1,026	213	533
Total	202	623,019	20,231	100	3,084
Total Without MLS Reserves	196	610,351	20,231	127	3,114

== Statistical leaders ==
=== Top scorers ===
Rank	Player	Nation	Club	Goals
1	Kevin Molino	TRI	Orlando City	20
2	Matthew Delicâte	ENG	Richmond Kickers	14
3	Chandler Hoffman	USA	LA Galaxy II	13
4	Aaron Schoenfeld	USA	Dayton Dutch Lions	12
5	George Davis IV	USA	Richmond Kickers	11
5	Thomas Stewart	NIR	Sacramento Republic	11
7	Jorge Herrera	COL	Charlotte Eagles	10
7	Dane Kelly	JAM	Charleston Battery	10
7	Rodrigo López	USA	Sacramento Republic	10
10	J. C. Banks	USA	Rochester Rhinos	9
10	Kyle Greig	USA	Oklahoma City Energy	9

=== Top assists ===
Rank	Player	Nation	Club	Assists
1	Kevin Molino	TRI	Orlando City	9
2	Rodrigo López	USA	Sacramento Republic	8
2	Drew Yates	USA	Charlotte Eagles	8
4	Max Alvarez	USA	Sacramento Republic	7
4	Matthew Dallman	USA	Pittsburgh Riverhounds	7
4	Adda Djeziri	DEN	Oklahoma City Energy	7
4	Raúl Mendiola	MEX	LA Galaxy II	7
8	Danny Earls	IRE	Pittsburgh Riverhounds	6
8	Yann Ekra	FRA	Harrisburg City Islanders	6
8	Morgan Langley	USA	Harrisburg City Islanders	6
8	Jack McBean	USA	LA Galaxy II	6
8	Shay Spitz	USA	Richmond Kickers	6

=== Top Goalkeepers ===
(Minimum of 1080 Minutes Played)

Rank	Goalkeeper	Club	GP	MINS	SVS	GA	GAA	W-L-T	SHO
1	(United States) John McCarthy	Rochester Rhinos	18	1620	41	13	0.722	8–4–6	10
2	(United States) Joe Willis	Richmond Kickers	18	1620	56	14	0.777	10–0–7	7
3	(New Zealand) Jake Gleeson	Sacramento Republic	17	1471	47	15	0.917	11–2–3	6
4	(Mexico) Miguel Gallardo	Orlando City	24	2160	66	23	0.958	17–4–3	8
5	(Cuba) Odisnel Cooper	Charleston Battery	24	2094	70	25	1.074	10–7–7	9
6	(United States) Samir Badr	Oklahoma City Energy	13	1093	33	14	1.152	3–6–3	3
7	(Guyana) Quillan Roberts	Wilmington Hammerheads	17	1514	37	20	1.188	5–4–6	5
8	(United States) Alec Kann	Charlotte Eagles	17	1515	56	22	1.306	6–8–3	3
9	(Puerto Rico) Cody Laurendi	LA Galaxy II	19	1665	35	25	1.351	10–6–3	4
10	(United States) Michael Lisch	Pittsburgh Riverhounds	17	1530	67	25	1.470	7–6–3	4

== League Awards ==
- Most Valuable Player: (Trinidad and Tobago) Kevin Molino (ORL)
- Rookie of the Year: (United States) John McCarthy (ROC)
- Defender of the Year: (Montenegro) Nemanja Vuković (SAC)
- Goalkeeper of the Year: (United States) John McCarthy (ROC)
- Coach of the Year: (United States) Preki (SAC)

== All-League Teams ==
=== First Team ===
F: (England) Matthew Delicâte (RIC), (United States) Chandler Hoffman (LAG), (Jamaica) Dane Kelly (CHB)
M: (United States) George Davis IV (RIC), (United States) Rodrigo López (SAC), (Trinidad and Tobago) Kevin Molino (ORL)
D: (England) Luke Boden (ORL), (Jamaica) Ashani Fairclough (WIL), (Montenegro) Nemanja Vuković (SAC), (Cameroon) William Yomby (RIC)
G: (United States) John McCarthy (ROC)

=== Second Team ===
F: (United States) J.C. Banks (ROC), (United States) Aaron Schoenfeld (DDL), (China) Long Tan (AZU)
M: (France) André Auras (LAG), (Colombia) Jorge Herrera (CHE), Allan Russell (OCB)
D: (United States) Matt Bahner (HAR), (Wales) Gareth Evans (OKC), (United States) Brad Rusin (ORL), (United States) Daniel Steres (LAG)
G: (United States) Joe Willis (RIC)
