= Steven Evans (soccer) =

American soccer player

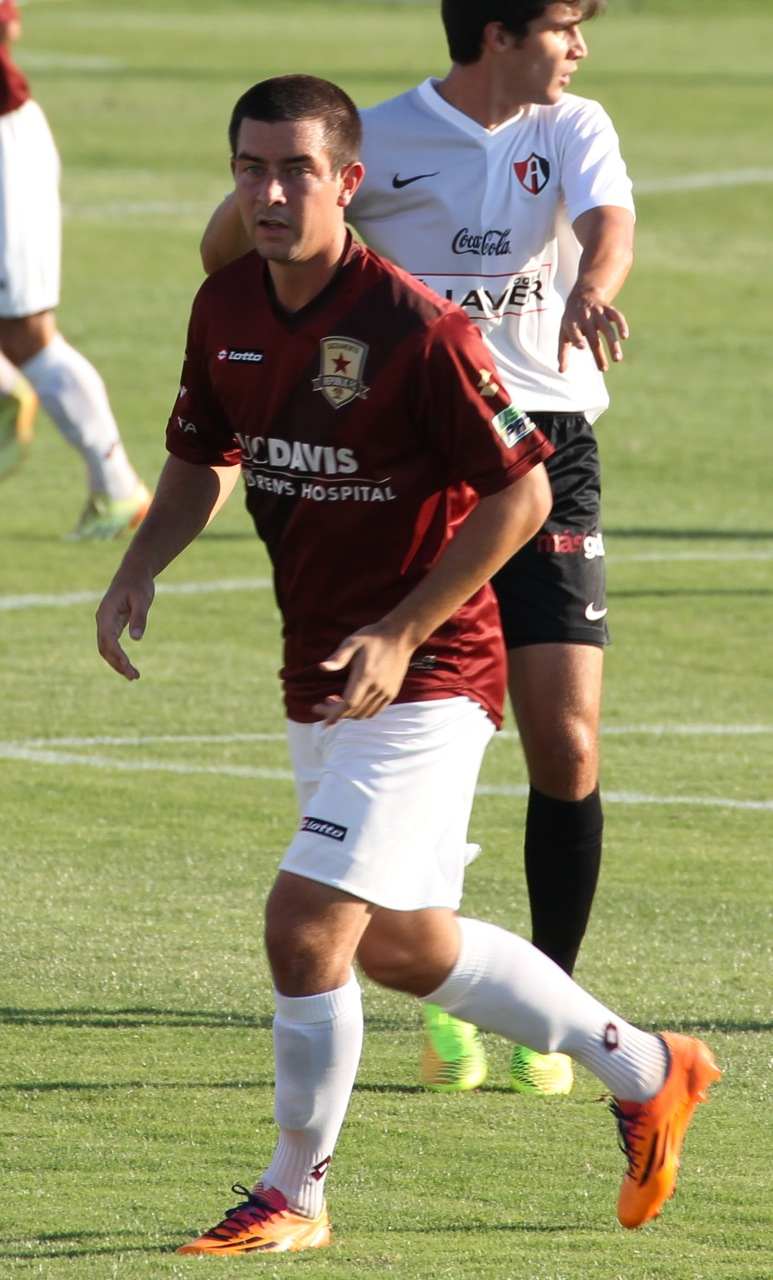

Personal information
- Date of birth: September 19, 1991 (age 35)
- Place of birth: Portland, Oregon, U.S.
- Height: 1.85 m (6 ft 1 in)
- Position: Midfielder

Team information
- Current team: FC Mulhouse Portland

Youth career
- 2006–2010: Eastside United FC
- 2010–2012: Portland Pilots

Senior career*
Years	Team	Apps	(Gls)
2009–2012	Portland Timbers U23s	37	(8)
2013–2014	Portland Timbers	0	(0)
2014	→ Sacramento Republic FC (loan)	11	(1)
2015	Portland Timbers 2	11	(1)
2018–	FC Mulhouse Portland	0	(0)

International career^{‡}
2010	United States U20	1	(0)
- * Club domestic league appearances and goals as of September 22, 2014 ‡ National team caps and goals as of September 22, 2014

Steven Evans (born September 19, 1991) is an American former professional soccer player.

== Career ==
=== Early career ===
Born in Portland, Oregon, Evans began his soccer career at Eastside United FC, which won the U.S. Youth Soccer U-18 national championship in 2010. He also was an all-state player for Portland's Central Catholic High School where he helped guide the Rams to a 2007 6A State Championship. In 2010 Evans started to attend the University of Portland for which he played for their school soccer team, the Portland Pilots, where he stayed for three seasons. While with the Pilots Evans earned the 2010 WCC Freshman of the Year award his first year, All-West Coast Conference selection all three seasons, and All-WCC First Team his final two years. In his final season with the Pilots Evans managed a career-best 14 goals which was ranked 8th amongst the NCAA.

During the summer months, Evans played for the Portland Timbers U23s in the USL Premier Development League who he started playing for in 2009. While with the Timbers U23s Evans assisted on the game-winning goal in the final match of the 2010 PDL season against the Thunder Bay Chill as the Timbers won the championship match that season 4–1 in an undefeated season for the under-23s.

=== Portland Timbers ===
On January 8, 2013, it was officially announced that Evans had been signed by the Portland Timbers on a homegrown player contract. Evans became the second homegrown player at the club after Brent Richards who signed in 2012. On December 8, 2014, Evans's option was declined for 2015 and signed a contract with Portland Timbers 2, the Timbers' USL Pro club.

=== Coaching ===
After 2015, Evans retired from playing, and returned to the University of Portland as an assistant coach.. He since has become a youth soccer coach for Westside metros FC in the Portland metro area.

== Personal life ==
Steven's younger brother, Nick, played varsity soccer for Central Catholic HS and for the Portland Timber's u-16 team. Nick won a state championship his junior year. He now plays at Concordia University-Portland. Their father formerly coached at Eastside Timbers FC and coached Steven at Eastside.

== Career statistics ==
As of June 13, 2013

Club	Season	League		MLS Cup		US Open Cup		CONCACAF		Total	
Club	Season	Apps	Goals	Apps	Goals	Apps	Goals	Apps	Goals	Apps	Goals
Portland Timbers	2013	0	0	0	0	1	0	0	0	1	0
Career total		0	0	0	0	1	0	0	0	1	0
