= Octavio Guzmán =

Mexican footballer (born 1990)

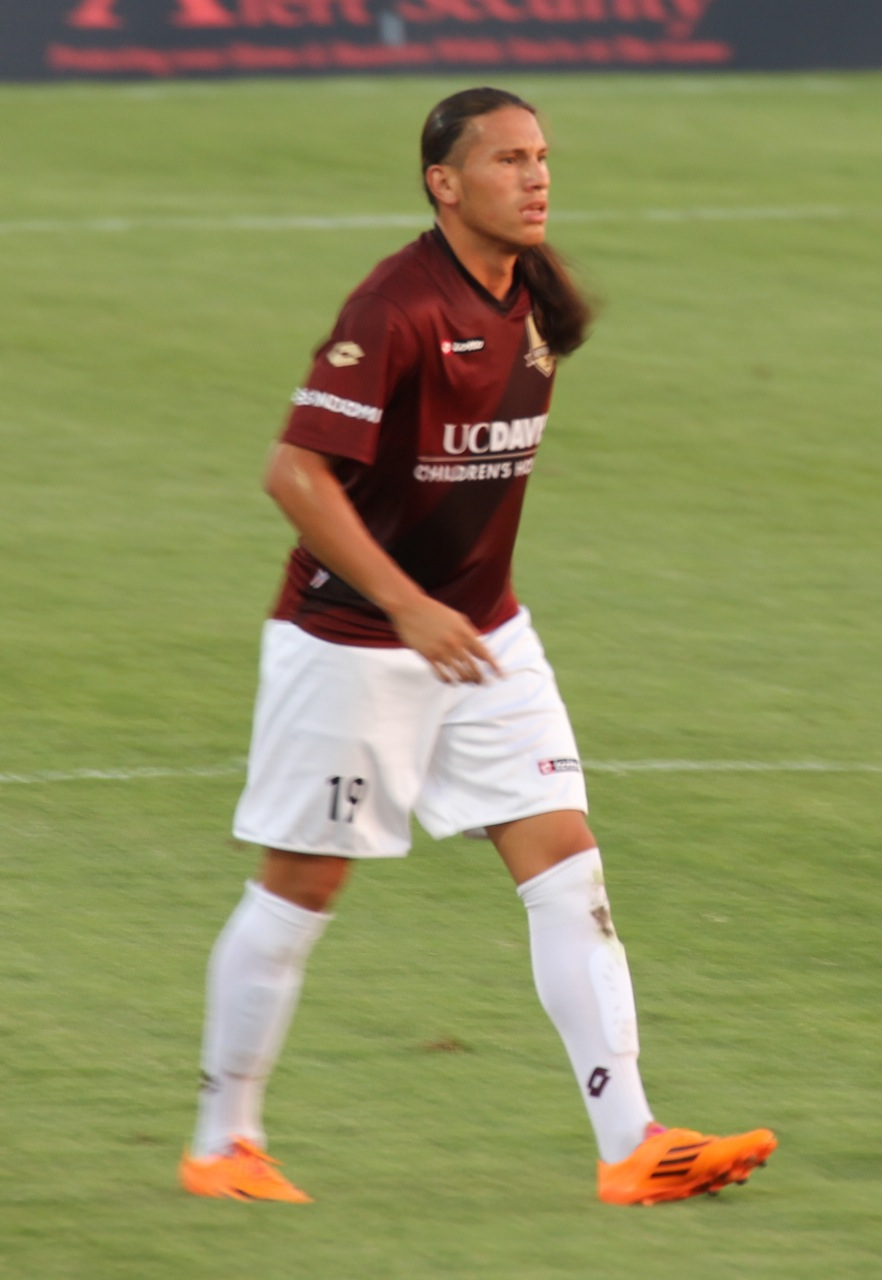
- Guzmán in 2014

Personal information
- Full name: Octavio Guzmán Sánchez
- Date of birth: 26 November 1990 (age 35)
- Place of birth: Guadalajara, Mexico
- Height: 5 ft 10 in (1.78 m)
- Position: Midfielder

Youth career
- 2004–2009: Diablo FC
- 2005–2009: Mt. Diablo Red Devils

College career
Years	Team	Apps	(Gls)
2009–2010	Los Medanos Mustangs		
2011–2013	Chico State Wildcats		

Senior career*
Years	Team	Apps	(Gls)
2013–2014	CD Aguiluchos USA		
2014–2016	Sacramento Republic	69	(7)
2017	Saint Louis FC	21	(2)
2018	CD Aguiluchos USA	7	(1)
2019	Oakland Roots	5	(0)
- * Club domestic league appearances and goals as of October 26, 2019

Octavio Guzmán Sánchez (born November 26, 1990) is a Mexican footballer who most recently played for Oakland Roots SC in the National Independent Soccer Association.

== Career ==
Guzmán played college soccer for two years at Los Medanos College before transferring to Chico State in 2011 where he graduated in 2013. He played for CD Aguiluchos USA of the National Premier Soccer League in 2013. He signed his first professional contract with USL Pro club Sacramento Republic in March, 2014.

On November 22, 2016 Saint Louis FC has agreed to a contract with midfielder Octavio Guzman, defender Wesley Charpie, and midfielder Mats Bjurman, pending United Soccer League and United States Soccer Federation approval.

In July 2019, Guzmán joined Oakland Roots.

== Honours ==
Sacramento Republic

- USL Cup: 2014
