= 2017 Sacramento Republic FC season =

Sacramento Republic FC
2017 season
- Owner: Warren Smith
- Head coach and technical director: Paul Buckle
- Stadium: Papa Murphy's Park
- U.S. Open Cup: Round of 16
- Top goalscorer: League: Sammy Ochoa (8); All: Trevin Caesar (9)
- Highest home attendance: 11,569
- Lowest home attendance: League: 11,569; All: 2,307 (5/31 v. RNO, USOC)
- Average home league attendance: League: 11,569; All: 10,356
- Biggest win: SAC 4–0 OC (4/1); SAC 6–2 RGV (6/21); SAC 4–0 ANA (5/17, USOC)

The 2017 Sacramento Republic FC season was the club's fourth season of existence. The club is playing in the United Soccer League, the second tier of the American soccer pyramid. Sacramento Republic FC competed in the Western Conference of the USL.

== Club ==
=== Roster ===
As of August 31, 2017.

No.	Position	Nation	Player
1	GK	USA	Dominik Jakubek
2	DF	IRL	Peter McGlynn
4	DF	MEX	Carlos Rodriguez
5	DF	USA	Chris Christian
6	MF	USA	Agustin Cazarez
8	FW	ENG	Wilson Kneeshaw
9	FW	ENG	Harry Williams
10	MF	USA	Danny Barrera (Captain)
11	FW	LBR	Gabe Gissie
12	GK	USA	Evan Newton
13	FW	USA	Sammy Ochoa
14	FW	SLE	Lamin Suma
15	DF	USA	James Kiffe
16	MF	SCO	Adam Moffat
17	FW	ENG	Tyler Blackwood
18	MF	USA	Roberto Hategan
19	FW	TRI	Trevin Caesar
20	FW	BUL	Villyan Bijev (on loan from Portland Timbers 2)
21	FW	USA	Christian Chaney
22	DF	PUR	Jeremy Hall
23	DF	MNE	Emrah Klimenta
26	DF	USA	Elliott Hord
27	FW	USA	Matt Wiesenfarth
32	MF	USA	Hayden Partain
40	FW	USA	Quincy Butler

=== Technical Staff ===
As of July 20, 2017.

Position	Name
Director of Football	(England) Graham Smith
Head coach and Technical Director	(England) Paul Buckle
Assistant head coach	(England) Adam Charles Smith
Assistant coach	(United States) Antonio Sutton
Goalkeeping coach	(England) Simon Sheppard
Video analyst	(United States) Chris Malenab
Strength & Conditioning Coach	(United States) Luke Rayfield
Athletic Trainer	(United States) John Duncan

== Competitions ==
=== Preseason ===
February 10, 2017	Sacramento Republic FC	Canceled	New York Red Bulls	Sacramento, California
19:30 PST		Report		Stadium: Bonney Field
Note: Canceled due to pitch conditions at Bonney Field and record rainfall.

February 18, 2017 Highway 99 Derby	Fresno Fuego	3–6	Sacramento Republic FC	Turlock, California
19:00 PST	Goal		Montano; Gisse	Stadium: Warrior Stadium; Attendance: Closed door
Note: Due to pitch conditions at Chukchansi Park, match was moved to Warrior Stadium at Stanislaus State.

February 22, 2017	Sacramento Republic FC	5–0	Sacramento Gold	Sacramento, California
19:00 PST	Gissie 2'; Trickett-Smith 5'; Chaney 57'; Ochoa 63' (pen.); Carvalho 81' (o.g.)	Match Recap		Stadium: American River College Soccer Stadium

February 25, 2017	San Jose Earthquakes	4–1	Sacramento Republic FC	San Jose, California
14:00 PST	Salinas 15'; Bernárdez (yellow card) 28'; Godoy (yellow card) 53'; Dawkins 66'; Hyka 79'; Hoesen 90'	Match Recap	Ochoa 54' (pen.); Williams (yellow card) 67'	Stadium: Avaya Stadium

March 1, 2017	Sacramento State Hornets	0–0	Sacramento Republic FC	Sacramento, California
PST		Match Recap		Stadium: John Smith Field

March 4, 2017	Sacramento Republic FC	2–2	FC Cincinnati	Sacramento, California
17:30 PST	Kiffe 65'; Kneeshaw 82'	Match Recap	Quinn 21' (pen.); Delbridge 90'	Stadium: Bonney Field; Attendance: 8,906

March 11, 2017	Reno 1868 FC	3–3	Sacramento Republic FC	Reno, Nevada
16:00 PST	Pridham 41'; Kelly 67'; Pridham 88'	Match Recap	Caesar 17'; Blackwood 20'; Ochoa 27' (pen.)	Stadium: Greater Nevada Field; Attendance: 4,554

March 18, 2017	San Francisco Deltas	0–0	Sacramento Republic FC	San Francisco, California
19:00 PST		Match Recap		Stadium: Kezar Stadium

March 22, 2017	Sacramento Republic FC	Canceled	San Jose Earthquakes	Sacramento, California
19:30 PST				Stadium: Bonney Field

==== Standings ====
Pos	Team	Pld	W	D	L	GF	GA	GD	Pts	Qualification
5	Phoenix Rising FC	32	17	7	8	50	37	+13	58	Conference Playoffs
6	OKC Energy FC	32	14	7	11	46	41	+5	49	Conference Playoffs
7	Tulsa Roughnecks	32	14	4	14	46	49	−3	46	Conference Playoffs
8	Sacramento Republic	32	13	7	12	45	43	+2	46	Conference Playoffs
9	Colorado Springs Switchbacks	32	12	8	12	55	51	+4	44	
10	Orange County SC	32	11	10	11	43	47	−4	43	
11	Rio Grande Valley Toros	32	9	8	15	37	50	−13	35	

Source: 2017 USL standings
Rules for classification: 1) total wins; 2) total goal differential; 3) total goals scored; 4) points earned against top four Conference finishers; 5) disciplinary points; 6) coin toss or drawing of lots

=== USL ===
March 26, 2017 1	Seattle Sounders FC 2	1–2	Sacramento Republic FC	Tukwila, Washington
14:00 PST	Nana-Sinkam 5'; Narbón (yellow card) 39'	Match Recap	Ochoa (yellow card) 63' (goal) 65'; Barrera (yellow card) 71'; Klimenta 85'	Stadium: Starfire Sports Complex; Attendance: 1,115

April 1, 2017 2	Sacramento Republic FC	4–0	Orange County SC	Sacramento, California
19:30 PST	Ochoa 23' 59'; Kneeshaw 68'; Moffat (yellow card) 74'; Williams 90+'	Match Recap	Ocegueda (yellow card) 32'	Stadium: Papa Murphy's Park; Attendance: 11,569

April 8, 2017 3	Tulsa Roughnecks FC	1–2	Sacramento Republic FC	Tulsa, Oklahoma
	Ugarte (yellow card) 42'; Alaya (yellow card) 63'; Caffa (yellow card) 77'; Calistri 80'	Match Recap	Klimenta (yellow card) 14'; Kneeshaw 48'; Blackwood 67'	Stadium: ONEOK Field; Attendance: 4,759

April 11, 2017 4	Oklahoma City Energy FC	1–0	Sacramento Republic FC	Oklahoma City, Oklahoma
	Gonzalez 30'; Wojick (yellow card) 62'	Match Recap	Christian (yellow card) 45' (yellow-red card) 82'	Stadium: Taft Stadium; Attendance: 3,032

April 15, 2017 5	Swope Park Rangers	1–0	Sacramento Republic FC	Kansas City, Kansas
	Oliveria (yellow card) 52'; Didic (yellow card) 57'; Gonzalez 70'	Match Recap		Stadium: Children's Mercy Park; Attendance: 1,002

April 22, 2017 6	Sacramento Republic FC	0–2	Portland Timbers 2	Sacramento, California
19:30 PST	Barrera (yellow card) 62'	Match Recap	Clarke (yellow card) 4'; Williams (yellow card) 28'; Bijev 40' (pen.); Arboleda 68'; Lewis (yellow card) 71'	Stadium: Papa Murphy's Park; Attendance: 11,569

April 29, 2017 7	Vancouver Whitecaps FC 2	0–0	Sacramento Republic FC	University Endowment Lands, British Columbia, Canada
	de Wit (yellow card) 88'	Match Recap	James (yellow card) 4'; Williams (yellow card) 90'	Stadium: Thunderbird Stadium; Attendance: 407; Referee: Yusri Rudolf

May 6, 2017 8	San Antonio FC	1–0	Sacramento Republic FC	San Antonio, Texas
	Castillo 64' (pen.)	Match Recap		Stadium: Toyota Stadium

May 13, 2017 9	Real Monarchs SLC	2–0	Sacramento Republic FC	Sandy, Utah
	Moberg (yellow card) 26'; Haber 38' (yellow card) 72'; Velasquez 58'; Adams (yellow card) 72'; Sparrow (yellow card) 90+'	Match Recap	Ceasar (yellow card) 29'; Kiffe (yellow card) 90+'	Stadium: Rio Tinto Stadium; Referee: Timothy Ford

May 20, 2017 10	Sacramento Republic FC	3–2	Tulsa Roughnecks FC	Sacramento, California
19:30 PST	Barrera 29'; Ochoa 31'; Klimenta (yellow card) 45+'; Jakubek (yellow card) 67'; Christian 74'; Caesar (yellow card) 77'	Match Recap	Calistri 7'; Ugarte (yellow card) 42'; Caffa 67' (pen.)	Stadium: Papa Murphy's Park; Attendance: 11,569; Referee: Marco Vega

May 28, 2017 11	Seattle Sounders FC 2	2–2	Sacramento Republic FC	Tukwila, Washington
	Mathers (yellow card) 30'; Nana-Sinkam 78'; Olsen 86'	Match Recap	James (yellow card) 45'; Hall (yellow card) 49'; Caesar 59'; Christian (yellow card) 77'; Blackwood 90+3'	Stadium: Starfire Sports Complex; Attendance: 995; Referee: Malik Badawi

June 3, 2017 12	Sacramento Republic FC	0–0	Rio Grande Valley FC Toros	Sacramento, California
		Match Recap		Stadium: Papa Murphy's Park; Attendance: 11,569

June 10, 2017 13	Reno 1868 FC	2–0	Sacramento Republic FC	Reno, Nevada
		Match Recap	Hoppenot 39'; Kelly 73'	Stadium: Greater Nevada Field; Attendance: 6,060

June 17, 2017 14	Sacramento Republic FC	2–1	Vancouver Whitecaps FC 2	Sacramento, California
	Ochoa 12'; Cazarez 74'	Match Recap	Campbell 5'	Stadium: Papa Murphy's Park; Attendance: 11,569

June 21, 2017 15	Sacramento Republic FC	6–2	Rio Grande Valley FC Toros	Sacramento, California
	Kneeshaw 19'; Blackwood 27'; Caesar 42', 57', 72'; Trickett-Smith 87'	Match Recap	Casner 64'; Murphy 90'	Stadium: Papa Murphy's Park; Attendance: 11,569

June 25, 2017 16	LA Galaxy II	2–3	Sacramento Republic FC	Carson, California
	Dhillon 54'; Vera 70'	Match Recap	Hall 11' (pen.); Kneeshaw 14'; Caesar 18'	Stadium: StubHub Track & Field Stadium; Attendance: 2,195

July 1, 2017 17	Sacramento Republic FC	1–1	San Antonio FC	Sacramento, California
	Klimenta 19'	Match Recap	Ajeakwa 31'	Stadium: Papa Murphy's Park; Attendance: 11,569

July 23, 2017 18	Sacramento Republic FC	2–0	Seattle Sounders FC 2	Sacramento, California
	Caesar 16'; Blackwood 60'	Match Recap		Stadium: Papa Murphy's Park; Attendance: 11,569

August 5, 2017 19	Sacramento Republic FC	1–0	Vancouver Whitecaps FC 2	Sacramento, California
	Hall 82' (pen.)			Stadium: Papa Murphy's Park; Attendance: 11,569

August 12, 2017 20	Portland Timbers 2	0–1	Sacramento Republic FC	Portland, Oregon
	Kneeshaw 14'			Stadium: Providence Park; Attendance: 1,976

August 19, 2017 21	Sacramento Republic FC	1–2	Reno 1868 FC	Sacramento, California
	Partain 15'		Kelly 17'; Wehan 22'	Stadium: Papa Murphy's Park; Attendance: 11,569

August 23, 2017 22	Sacramento Republic FC	2–2	Swope Park Rangers KC	Sacramento, California
	Kneeshaw 36'; Blackwood 88'		Saad 4'; Belmar 68'	Stadium: Papa Murphy's Park; Attendance: 11,569

August 26, 2017 23	Phoenix Rising FC	3–1	Sacramento Republic FC	Phoenix, Arizona
	Cortez 10'; Wakasa (yellow card) 38'; Johnson 48', (yellow card) 90'; Ramage 52'		Partian (yellow card) 37'; Caesar 50'	Stadium: Phoenix Rising FC Soccer Complex; Attendance: 5,693

September 2, 2017 24	Sacramento Republic FC	2–2	Colorado Springs Switchbacks FC	Sacramento, California
19:30 PST	Cazarez 37'; Wiesenfarth 45+2'		Vercollone 38'; Eboussi 91'	Stadium: Papa Murphy's Park; Attendance: 11,569

September 9, 2017 25	Rio Grande Valley FC Toros	2–1	Sacramento Republic FC	Edinburg, Texas
	Wharton (yellow card) 33'; Murphy 69'		Partain (yellow card) 40'; Bijev 72'; Rodriguez 90'	Stadium: H-E-B Park; Attendance: 6,083

September 16, 2017 26	Sacramento Republic FC	2–1	LA Galaxy II	Sacramento, California
19:30 PST	Espino 26'; Bijev 61'		Zubak 1'; Covarrubias (yellow card) 45'; Hernandez (yellow card) 50'; Mendez (yellow card) 89'	Stadium: Papa Murphy's Park; Attendance: 11,569

September 23, 2017 27	Sacramento Republic FC	1–3	Oklahoma City Energy FC	Sacramento, California
19:30 PST	Klimenta 59'		Angulo 1'; Brown 9'; Gonzalez 83'	Stadium: Papa Murphy's Park; Attendance: 11,569

September 27, 2017 28	Sacramento Republic FC	0–2	Real Monarchs SLC	Sacramento, California
19:30 PST	Ochoa (yellow card) 50'		Putna (yellow card) 3'; Mare 47'; Hoffman 49'	Stadium: Papa Murphy's Park; Attendance: 11,569

September 30, 2017 29	Sacramento Republic FC	2–0	Phoenix Rising FC	Sacramento, California
19:30 PST	McGlynn (yellow card) 45'; Klimenta 49'; Cazarez 54'; Kiffe (yellow card) 60'; Hall (yellow card) 76'		Hamilton (yellow card) 34'; Watson (yellow card) 48'	Stadium: Papa Murphy's Park; Attendance: 11,569

October 4, 2017 30	Orange County SC	3–1	Sacramento Republic FC	Orange County, California
	Pacheco 27'; Stevanovic 80'; van Ewijk 90'		Ochoa 43'; Kiffe (yellow card) 86'	Stadium: Orange County Great Park; Attendance: 1,879

October 7, 2017 30	Colorado Springs Switchbacks FC	1–0	Sacramento Republic FC	Colorado Springs, Colorado
	Frater 36'; Argueta (yellow card) 40'		Hall (yellow card) 33'; McGlynn (yellow card) 54'; Christian (yellow card) 69'; Ochoa (yellow card) 79'	Stadium: Switchback Stadium; Attendance: 3,860

October 14, 2017 31	Reno 1868 FC	2–2	Sacramento Republic FC	Reno, Nevada
	Wehan 41'; Hoppenot 51'; Bersano (yellow card) 65'; LaGrassa (yellow card) 82'		Ochoa 16', (yellow card) 48', (goal) 67'; Christian (yellow card) 53'	Stadium: Greater Nevada Field; Attendance: 6,144

=== U.S. Open Cup ===
May 17, 2017 Second round	Sacramento Republic FC (California)	4–0	(Nevada) Anahuac	Sacramento, California
7:30 PM	Williams 12' 15'; Kneeshaw 66'; Trickett-Smith 85'	Match Recap		Stadium: Papa Murphy's Park; Attendance: 5,308

May 31, 2017 Third round	Sacramento Republic FC (California)	2–0	(Nevada) Reno 1868 FC	Sacramento, California
7:30 PM	Willams 41'; Caesar 58'	Match Recap		Stadium: Papa Murphy's Park; Attendance: 2,307

June 14, 2017 Fourth round	Sacramento Republic FC (California)	4–1	(Utah) Real Salt Lake	Sacramento, California
8:05 PM	Caesar 29'; Cazarez 43'; Hall 45' (pen.); Barrera 71'	Match Recap	Velazco 35'	Stadium: Papa Murphy's Park; Attendance: 11,569

June 28, 2017 Fifth round	LA Galaxy (California)	2-0	(California) Sacramento Republic FC	Carson, California
7:30 PM	Lassiter 47'; Jamieson IV 49'	Match Recap		Stadium: StubHub Center; Attendance: 2,195

=== Friendlies ===
July 15, 2017	Sacramento Republic FC (United States)	0-3	(Mexico) CF Pachuca	Sacramento, California
19:30 PST			Guzmán 21'; Cano 40'; Sagal 59'	Stadium: Bonney Field; Attendance: 11,569

== Transfers ==
=== In ===
No.	Pos.	Player	Transferred from	Fee/notes	Date	Source
20	DF	(United States) Enrique Montano	(United States) Louisville City FC		November 9, 2016	
2	DF	(Republic of Ireland) Peter McGlynn	(Republic of Ireland) Longford Town FC		November 19, 2016	
17	FW	(England) Tyler Blackwood	(United States) Arizona United SC		November 29, 2016	
11	FW	(Liberia) Gabe Gissie	(United States) Bethlehem Steel FC		December 3, 2016	
14	FW	(Sierra Leone) Lamin Suma	(United States) Philadelphia Fury		December 5, 2016	
16	MF	(Scotland) Adam Moffat	(United States) New York Cosmos		January 3, 2017	
22	DF	(United States) Jeremy Hall	(United States) Tampa Bay Rowdies		January 3, 2017	
19	FW	(Trinidad and Tobago) Trevin Caesar	(United States) Orange County Blues		January 4, 2017	
13	FW	(Mexico) Sammy Ochoa	(United States) Tulsa Roughnecks		February 24, 2017	
3	DF	(Trinidad and Tobago) Julius James	(Trinidad and Tobago) Central FC		March 17, 2017	
18	MF	(United States) Roberto Hategan	(United States) Sacramento Republic FC Academy		June 30, 2017	
32	MF	(United States) Hayden Partain	(United States) Des Moines Menace		August 5, 2017	
27	FW	(United States) Matt Wiesenfarth	(United States) Burlingame Dragons FC		August 11, 2017	
40	FW	(United States) Quincey Butler	(United States) Sacramento Republic FC Academy		August 18, 2017	

=== Out ===
No.	Pos.	Player	Transferred to	Fee/notes	Date	Source
10	FW	(England) Carlton Cole	(Indonesia) Persib Bandung		October 19, 2016	
22	MF	(United States) Chase Minter	(United States) Real Monarchs		November 17, 2016	
17	MF	(Mexico) Octavio Guzman	(United States) Saint Louis FC		November 22, 2016	
16	DF	(United States) Matt LaGrassa	(United States) Reno 1868 FC		December 20, 2016	
24	MF	(United States) JJ Koval		Retirement	December 21, 2016	
19	FW	(Canada) Mackenzie Pridham	(United States) Reno 1868 FC		December 21, 2016	
2	DF	(Republic of Ireland) Derek Foran	(Republic of Ireland) Bray Wanderers FC		January 3, 2017	
14	FW	(United States) Cameron Iwasa	(United States) Sporting Kansas City		January 10, 2017	
7	FW	(El Salvador) Joaquin Rivas	(United States) Tulsa Roughnecks		February 28, 2017	
3	DF	(United States) Mike da Fonte	(United States) Colorado Rapids		March 14, 2017	
11	MF	(United States) Max Alvarez	(United States) Saint Louis FC		March 31, 2017	
20	DF	(United States) Enrique Montano		Released by mutual consent	August 11, 2017	
3	DF	(Trinidad and Tobago) Julius James		Released by mutual consent	August 16, 2017	
7	MF	(England) Daniel Trickett-Smith		Released by mutual consent	August 18, 2017	

=== Loan in ===
No.	Pos.	Player	Loaned from	Fee/notes	Date	Source
24	MF	(England) Harrison Heath	(United States) Atlanta United FC	Recalled from loan on July 31, 2017	June 30, 2017	
