= 2016 Sacramento Republic FC season =

Sacramento Republic FC
2016 season
- Owner: Warren Smith
- Head coach: Paul Buckle
- Stadium: Bonney Field
- U.S. Open Cup: 3rd Round
- Top goalscorer: League: Cameron Iwasa (11); All: Cameron Iwasa (12)
- Highest home attendance: 11,569 (Multiple games)
- Lowest home attendance: League: 10,745 (Jun. 8 vs. Real Monarchs); All: 10,240 (Feb. 13 vs. Colorado)
- Average home league attendance: League: 11,451; All: 11,322

The 2016 Sacramento Republic FC season was the club's third season of existence. The club plays in the United Soccer League (USL), the third tier of the American soccer pyramid. After off season expansion of the USL from 24 to 31 teams, Sacramento Republic FC moved to the new Western Conference. The season began in March 2016 and concluded in September 2016.

== Background ==
2015 saw much growth in attendance with the expansion of Bonney Field, but this was not a sign of things to come for the club. In 2015, the Republic failed to produce on the field as they did the year before, dropping out of the playoffs in the first round. Their performance in the 2014 U.S. Open Cup was mirrored in 2015, once again losing to San Jose earthquakes in the 4th round. The 2015 season was riddled with emotional setbacks, MLS decided on Minnesota as its newest expansion over Sacramento. The Republic lost the head coach, Coach Preki, who they felt would be the one to propel the team to the MLS. At the end of the season, the player with the most MLS experience, whom some considered the star player, Rodrigo López announced he would return to Mexico and play for Celaya FC in the Ascenso MX.

The 2016 preseason, the club looked to turn things around. The club picked up Nike as their kit manufacturers, redesigned the team jersey and, on December 2, Sacramento city council approved the Republic's MLS stadium plan with a unanimous vote. Their hopes were once again revitalized three days later, when the MLS board announced its decision to once again expand the league from 24 to 28 teams.

Sacramento Republic F.C. continued their off season productivity by extending several players contracts, including fan-favorite, Octavio Guzmán and hometown hero, Cameron Iwasa. The club's Academy contributed to the off season's ambition with its U-16 and U-18 team both going undefeated in the U.S. Soccer Development Academy Winter Showcase in Lakewood Ranch, Florida.

== Club ==
As of September 17, 2016.

No.	Position	Nation	Player
1	GK	USA	Dominik Jakubek
2	DF	IRL	Derek Foran
3	DF	USA	Mike da Fonte
4	MF	USA	Alfonso Motagalvan
5	DF	COL	Danny Barrera
6	MF	USA	Agustin Cazarez
7	FW	ESA	Joaquin Rivas
8	DF	USA	Chris Christian
9	FW	ENG	Harry Williams
10	FW	ENG	Carlton Cole
11	FW	USA	Max Alvarez
12	GK	USA	Evan Newton
13	DF	USA	Christian Chaney
14	FW	USA	Cameron Iwasa
15	DF	MEX	Carlos Rodriguez
16	MF	USA	Matt LaGrassa
17	MF	MEX	Octavio Guzmán
18	MF	ENG	Daniel Trickett-Smith
19	FW	CAN	Mackenzie Pridham
20	DF	USA	James Kiffe
22	MF	USA	Chase Minter
23	DF	MNE	Emrah Klimenta
24	MF	USA	J.J. Koval
26	DF	USA	Elliott Hord
28	MF	PUR	Jeremy Hall
29	FW	ENG	Wilson Kneeshaw

=== Technical Staff ===
As of June 25, 2015.

Position	Name
Technical director	(England) Graham Smith
Head coach	(England) Paul Buckle
Assistant head coach	(United States) Adam Charles Smith
Assistant coach	(United States) Chris Malenab
Assistant coach	(United States) Antonio Sutton
Goalkeeping coach	(England) Simon Sheppard
Strength & Conditioning Coach	(United States) Luke Rayfield

== Competitions ==
=== Preseason ===
February 13, 2016	Sacramento Republic FC	0–1	Colorado Rapids	Sacramento, California
17:00 PST		Report	Cochran 86'	Stadium: Bonney Field; Attendance: 10,240

February 17, 2016	Sacramento Republic FC	Postponed	Burlingame Dragons FC	Sacramento, California
				Stadium: Consumnes River College Stadium

February 20, 2016	Sacramento Republic FC	1–2	San Jose Earthquakes	Sacramento, California
17:00 PST	Pridham 8'	Report	Amarikwa 51', 86'; Godoy (yellow card) 81'; Thompson (yellow card) 90'	Stadium: Bonney Field; Attendance: 11,499

February 24, 2016	Sacramento State Hornets	0–1	Sacramento Republic FC	Sacramento, California
15:00 PST		Report	Williams 13'; Barrera (yellow card) 77'	Stadium: Hornet Stadium; Attendance: 907

February 27, 2016	Sonoma County Sol	0–4	Sacramento Republic FC	Santa Rosa, California
19:00 PST		Report	Stewart 5' (pen.), 62'; Klimenta 51'; Kiffe 86'	Stadium: Nevers Field; Attendance: 1,200

March 3, 2016 Highway 99 Derby	Fresno Fuego	1–1 (3–5 p)	Sacramento Republic FC	Fresno, California
18:30 PST	Blanco 27'	Report	Pridham 86'	Stadium: Chukchansi Park

March 5, 2016	UC Santa Barbara Gauchos	1–6	Sacramento Republic FC	Santa Barbara, California
		Summary		Stadium: Harder Stadium

March 6, 2016	Ventura County Fusion	1–0	Sacramento Republic FC	Ventura, California
15:10 PST	Mackenna 43'; Gonzalez (yellow card) 71'	Summary		Stadium: Ventura College Sportsplex

March 13, 2016	Sacramento Republic FC	Postponed	UC Davis Aggies	Sacramento, California
15:30 PST		Postponement		Stadium: Consumnes River College Stadium
Note: Postponed due to weather. Match will be rescheduled

=== USL ===
March 25, 2016 1	Seattle Sounders FC 2	0–1	Sacramento Republic FC	Tukwila, Washington
19:30 PST		Report	Cazarez (yellow card) 60'; Stewart 63' (pen.); Thompson (yellow card) 67'	Stadium: Starfire Sports Complex; Attendance: 1,277; Referee: Baboucarr Jallow

April 2, 2016 2	Sacramento Republic FC	1–0	Arizona United SC	Sacramento, California
19:30 PST	Christian (yellow card) 45'; Iwasa 84'; Guzmán (yellow card) 85'	Report		Stadium: Bonney Field; Attendance: 11,569; Referee: Joseph Dickerson

April 10, 2016 3	Vancouver Whitecaps FC 2	0–0	Sacramento Republic FC	University Endowment Lands, British Columbia, Canada
15:00 PST	Seymore (yellow card) 57'; Flores (yellow card) 86'	Report	Alvarez (yellow card) 89'	Stadium: Thunderbird Stadium; Attendance: 3,057

April 17, 2016 4	Portland Timbers 2	1–0	Sacramento Republic FC	Portland, Oregon
14:00 PST	Belmar 45'; Belmar (yellow card) 58'; Brett (yellow card) 90'		Christian (yellow card) 12'; Jahn (red card) 76'	Stadium: Merlo Field; Attendance: 1,649; Referee: Ramy Touchan

April 23, 2016 5	Sacramento Republic FC	0–1	Saint Louis FC	Sacramento, California
19:30 PST	Foran (yellow card) 90'	Report	Musa (yellow card) 24'; Ambersley 59'; Dixon (yellow card) 74'; Mclain (yellow card) 90'	Stadium: Bonney Field; Attendance: 11,569; Referee: Michael Zapata

April 30, 2016 6	Sacramento Republic FC	0–1	Orange County Blues FC	Sacramento, California
19:30 PST	Foran (yellow card) 44'; Iwasa (yellow card) 56'; Barrera (yellow card) 69'; Guzmán (yellow card) 72'	Report	Popara 16'; Mirković (yellow card) 34'; Popara (yellow card) 88'	Stadium: Bonney Field; Attendance: 11,569; Referee: Farhad Dadkho

May 7, 2016 7	LA Galaxy II	0–2	Sacramento Republic FC	Carson, California
19:30 PST	McBean (yellow card) 81'; Nathan Smith (yellow card) 90'	Report	Klimenta 16'; Williams (yellow card) 34'; Iwasa (yellow card) 56'; Williams 62'; Stewart (yellow card) 90'	Stadium: StubHub Center; Attendance: 1, 604; Referee: Alex Chilowicz

May 14, 2016 8	Sacramento Republic FC	2–0	Seattle Sounders FC 2	Sacramento, California
19:30 PST	Thompson 32', 47'; Guzmán (yellow card) 33'; Christian (yellow card) 36'	Report		Stadium: Bonney Field; Attendance: 11,569; Referee: Luis Guardia

May 28, 2016 9	Sacramento Republic FC	1–1	Swope Park Rangers	Sacramento, California
19:30 PST	Foran (yellow card) 33'; Cazarez (yellow card) 67'; Iwasa 76'	Report	Pasher (yellow card) 57'; Oliveira 73'; Ualefi (yellow card) 86'	Stadium: Bonney Field; Attendance: 11,569; Referee: Joseph Dickerson

June 4, 2016 10	Sacramento Republic FC	2–2	LA Galaxy II	Sacramento, California
20:00 PST	Kiffe (yellow card) 12'; Foran (yellow card) 45'; Barrera 51'; Trickett-Smith 81'; Trickett-Smith (yellow card) 88' (red card) 90'	Report	Zubak (yellow card) 21'; Villarreal (yellow card) 45'; Villarreal 57', 58'; Sorto (yellow card) 75'; Smith (yellow card) 90'	Stadium: Bonney Field; Attendance: 11,569; Referee: Levi Rippy

June 8, 2016 11	Sacramento Republic FC	1–0	Real Monarchs SLC	Sacramento, California
20:00 PST	Jahn 47'; Klimenta (yellow card) 48'; Kiffe (yellow card) 74'; H. Williams (yellow card) 85'; Motagalvan (yellow card) 88'	Report		Stadium: Bonney Field; Attendance: 10,745; Referee: Malik Badawi

June 11, 2016 12	Real Monarchs SLC	1–2	Sacramento Republic FC	Reno, Nevada
TBD PST	Velazco 41'	Report	Iwasa 47'; Jahn 55'; Stewart (yellow card) 78'	Stadium: Aces Ballpark; Attendance: 5,182; Referee: Victor Rivas

June 18, 2016 13	Sacramento Republic FC	3–2	Rio Grande Valley FC Toros	Sacramento, California
20:00 PST	Iwasa 1', 54' da Fonte (yellow card) 36'; Jahn (yellow card) 50'; Christian (yellow card) 77'; Klimenta 87'	Report	Me. Rodriguez 14'; Bird 71'	Stadium: Bonney Field; Attendance: 11,569; Referee: Reyna Fonseca

June 25, 2016 14	Arizona United SC	1–1	Sacramento Republic FC	Peoria, Arizona
19:30 PST	Blackwood 54'; Rooney (yellow card) 76'; Kelly (yellow card) 90'	Report	Alvarez (yellow card) 66'; Pridham 90'	Stadium: Peoria Sports Complex; Attendance: 1,145; Referee: Alexandro Mariscal

July 2, 2016 15	Sacramento Republic FC	2–1	Seattle Sounders FC 2	Sacramento, California
20:00 PST	H. Williams 5' da Fonte 78'; Christian (yellow card) 83' da Fonte (yellow card) 83'; Motagalvan (yellow card) 90'	Report	Nelson (yellow card) 49'; Mathers 70'	Stadium: Bonney Field; Attendance: 11,569; Referee: Andrew Musashe

July 6, 2016 16	Sacramento Republic FC	2–3	Real Monarchs SLC	Sacramento, California
20:00 PST	da Fonte 53'; Barrera 58'	Report	Lachowecki (yellow card) 38'; Kavita (yellow card) 66'; Velazco 72'; Torres (yellow card) 79'; Frater 82'; Foran 90' (o.g.)	Stadium: Bonney Field; Attendance: 11,569; Referee: Michael Zapata

July 10, 2016 17	Orange County Blues FC	3–3	Sacramento Republic FC	Irvine, California
16:00 PST	Crettenand 51', 81'; Mirković (yellow card) 56'; Caesar 72'; Pluntke (yellow card) 88'	Report	da Fonte 21'; Motagalvan (yellow card) 27'; Guzmán (yellow card) 38'; Iwasa 79' da Fonte (yellow card) 80' (red card) 87'; Pridham 83'; Barrera (yellow card) 83'	Stadium: Anteater Stadium; Attendance: 980; Referee: Ramy Touchan

July 16, 2016 18	Colorado Springs Switchbacks	1–0	Sacramento Republic FC	Colorado Springs, Colorado
18:00 PST	Argueta (yellow card) 53'; J. J. Greer (yellow card) 71'; J. J. Greer 83'	Report	Guzmán (yellow card) 86'	Stadium: Sand Creek Stadium; Attendance: 3,401; Referee: Malik Badawi

July 24, 2016 19	Vancouver Whitecaps FC 2	2–1	Sacramento Republic FC	University Endowment Lands, British Columbia, Canada
14:00 PST	Bustos 22'; Edgar (yellow card) 45'; Sanner 90'	Report	J.J. Koval (yellow card) 6'; Iwasa 14'; Barrera (yellow card) 45'; Kiffe (yellow card) 50'; LaGrassa (yellow card) 69'	Stadium: Thunderbird Stadium; Attendance: 1,948

July 30, 2016 20	Rio Grande Valley TC Toros	0–0	Sacramento Republic FC	Edinburg, Texas
17:30 PST	Malki (yellow card) 79'	Report	Foran (yellow card) 25' da Fonte (yellow card) 41'; Alvarez (yellow card) 55'	Stadium: RGVFC Stadium; Attendance: 1,920; Referee: Tyler Mitcham

August 2, 2016 21	Oklahoma City Energy FC	0–1	Sacramento Republic FC	Oklahoma City, Oklahoma
17:30 PST	Hyland (yellow card) 54' (red card) 90'; C. Andrews (yellow card) 71'; König (yellow card) 90'	Report	Kiffe 84'	Stadium: Taft Stadium; Attendance: 3,753; Referee: Luis Guardia

August 6, 2016 22	Sacramento Republic FC	1–1	San Antonio FC	Sacramento, California
20:00 PST	Kiffe (yellow card) 81'; Guzmán 90' p.k.	Report	Elizondo 15'; McCarthy (yellow card) 66'; Alvarez (yellow card) 84'; Salazar (yellow card) 90'	Stadium: Bonney Field; Attendance: 11,569; Referee: Victor Rivas

August 13, 2016 23	Saint Louis FC	3–4	Sacramento Republic FC	Fenton, Missouri
17:30 PST	Ambersley 26'; J. Roberts 74'; Dixon (yellow card) 87'; Bond 90'	Report	J.J. Koval 5'; Iwasa 11', 57'; Guzmán 17'; T. Thompson (yellow card) 83'; Newton (yellow card) 90'	Stadium: World Wide Technology Soccer Park; Attendance: 5,453; Referee: John Freemon

August 20, 2016 24	Sacramento Republic FC	4–0	Portland Timbers 2	Sacramento, California
20:00 PST	da Fonte 4'; LaGrassa (yellow card) 22'; Iwasa 45'; Thompson 48'; Thompson (yellow card) 67'; Kneeshaw 82'	Report	Farfan (yellow card) 25'; Besler (yellow card) 37'	Stadium: Bonney Field; Attendance: 11,569; Referee: Michael Zapata

August 24, 2016 25	Orange County Blues FC	0 - 1	Sacramento Republic FC	Irvine, California
19:30 PST	Ivan Mirković (yellow card) 27'; Campbell (yellow card) 39'; Valimaa (yellow card) 80'		Koval (yellow card) 11'; Iwasa 76'	Stadium: Anteater Stadium; Attendance: 463

August 27, 2016 26	Sacramento Republic FC	0 - 0	Vancouver Whitecaps FC 2	Sacramento, California
20:00 PST	Christian (yellow card) 58'			Stadium: Bonney Field; Attendance: 11,569

September 3, 2016 27	Sacramento Republic FC	2 - 1	Orange County Blues	Sacramento, California
19:30 PST	Hall (yellow card) 36'; LaGrassa 48'; Williams 85'		Crettenand 45'; Cortes (yellow card) 66'; Ajeakwa (red card) 87'; Watson-Siriboe (yellow card) 88'	Stadium: Bonney Field; Attendance: 11,569

September 10, 2016 28	LA Galaxy II	1 - 1	Sacramento Republic FC	Carson, California
19:30 PST	Amaya (yellow card) 29'; Lassiter 38'; Villarreal (yellow card) 65'; Villarreal (yellow card) 85'		LaGrassa (yellow card) 33'; Kneeshaw 83'	Stadium: StubHub Center; Attendance: 1,417

September 17, 2016 29	Sacramento Republic FC	1 - 1	LA Galaxy II	Sacramento, California
19:30 PST	Barrera (yellow card) 69'; Iwasa (yellow card) 74'; Kneeshaw 80'; Kiffe (yellow card) 90'		Zubak 44'; Rebellón (yellow card) 62' (red card) 75'; Smith (yellow card) 65'	Stadium: Bonney Field

September 24, 2016 30	Tulsa Roughnecks FC	0 - 4	Sacramento Republic FC	Tulsa, Oklahoma
17:30 PST	Kaleemullah (yellow card) 34'; Lee (yellow card) 50'		Pridham 10'; Iwasa 19'; Barrera 35'; Guzman (yellow card) 83'; Williams 90'	Stadium: ONEOK Field

=== Results summary ===
Overall								Home						Away					
Pld	W	D	L	GF	GA	GD	Pts	W	D	L	GF	GA	GD	W	D	L	GF	GA	GD
25	12	7	6	35	24	+11	43	6	3	3	19	12	+7	6	4	3	16	12	+4

Round	1	2	3	4	5	6	7	8	9	10	11	12	13	14	15	16	17	18	19	20	21	22	23	24	25	26	27	28	29	30
Stadium	A	H	A	A	H	H	A	H	H	H	H	A	H	A	H	H	A	A	A	A	A	H	A	H	A	H	H	A	H	A
Result	W	W	D	L	L	L	W	W	D	D	W	W	W	D	W	L	D	L	L	D	W	D	W	W	W					

Updated to match(es) played on June 5, 2016. Source:
A = Away; H = Home; W = Win; D = Draw; L = Loss

==== Standings ====
Pos	Team	Pld	W	D	L	GF	GA	GD	Pts	Qualification
1	Sacramento Republic	30	14	10	6	43	27	+16	52	Conference Playoffs
2	Rio Grande Valley Toros	30	14	9	7	47	24	+23	51	Conference Playoffs
3	Colorado Springs Switchbacks	30	14	7	9	37	27	+10	49	Conference Playoffs
4	Swope Park Rangers	30	14	6	10	45	36	+9	48	Conference Playoffs
5	LA Galaxy II	30	12	11	7	52	42	+10	47	Conference Playoffs

Source: 2016 USL Standings
Rules for classification: 1) total wins; 2) total goal differential; 3) total goals scored; 4) points earned against top four Conference finishers; 5) disciplinary points; 6) coin toss or drawing of lots

=== U.S. Open Cup ===
May 18 Second round	Sacramento Republic FC (California)	5–0	(California) CD Aguiluchos USA	Sacramento, California
7:30 PM	Motagalvan 24'; Pridham 36'; Rodriguez 44'; Stewart 45'; Alvarez 92'	Report	Bengy Ruiz (yellow card) 20'; Morales (yellow card) 48'; Ricardo Guerra (yellow card) 67'; Ross Middlemiss (yellow card) 81'	Stadium: Bonney Field

June 1 Third round	Sacramento Republic FC (California)	1–3	(Washington (state)) Kitsap Pumas	Sacramento, California
8:00 PM	Iwasa 61'; Klimenta (yellow card) 71'	Report	Joel Waterman (yellow card) 31'; Castro 60', 65'; Mike Ramos 63'; Darius Madison (yellow card) 90'	Stadium: Bonney Field; Referee: Victor Rivas

=== Friendlies ===
May 21, 2016	Sacramento Republic FC (United States)	2–1	(England) Liverpool FC U-21	Sacramento, California
7:30 pm	Cazarez 30'; Kiffe 86'	Report	Kent 75'; Stewart (yellow card) 76'	Stadium: Bonney Field

May 25, 2016	Sacramento Republic FC (United States)	2–2	(England) Liverpool FC U-21	Reno, Nevada
7:00 pm	Trickett-Smith 40'; Williams 90'		Kent 5'; Jones (yellow card) 38'; Brannagan 77'	Stadium: Greater Nevada Field; Attendance: 6,287; Referee: Joseph Dickerson

October 5, 2016	Sacramento Republic FC (United States)	1–1	(Mexico) CD Guadalajara	Sacramento, California
7:00 pm	Barrera 36'; Jakubek (yellow card) 90'		Bueno 18'	Stadium: Bonney Field

== Transfers ==
=== In ===
No.	Pos.	Player	Transferred from	Fee/notes	Date	Source
12	GK	(United States) Evan Newton	(United States) Oklahoma City Energy FC		December 9, 2015	
3	DF	(United States) Mike da Fonte	(United States) New York Red Bulls II		December 21, 2015	
8	DF	(United States) Chris Christian	(United States) Colorado Springs Switchbacks		January 25, 2016	
16	MF	(United States) Matt LaGrassa	(United States) Cal Poly		February 2, 2016	
15	DF	(Mexico) Carlos Rodriguez	(Mexico) Cesifut		February 2, 2016	
19	FW	(Canada) Mackenzie Pridham	(Canada) Vancouver Whitecaps FC 2		February 23, 2016	
9	FW	(England) Harry Williams	(England) Cheltenham Town FC		February 24, 2016	
22	MF	(United States) Chase Minter	(United States) Ventura County Fusion		March 16, 2016	
24	MF	(United States) J.J. Koval	(United States) San Jose Earthquakes		March 23, 2016	
18	MF	(England) Daniel Trickett-Smith	(England) Liverpool FC U-21s		May 19, 2016	
11	FW	(England) Wilson Kneeshaw	(United States) Blyth Spartans		August 11, 2016	
13	FW	(United States) Christian Chaney	(United States) Fresno Fuego		August 12, 2016	
26	DF	(United States) Elliott Hord	(United States) Fresno Fuego		August 19, 2016	

=== Out ===
No.	Pos.	Player	Transferred to	Fee/notes	Date	Source
17	FW	(United States) Justin Braun	(United States) Indy Eleven		January 19, 2016	
12	DF	(United States) Nemanja Vuković	(United States) Indy Eleven		January 19, 2016	
24	GK	(United States) Patrick McLain	(United States) Chicago Fire		January 19, 2016	
18	MF	(United States) Ivan Mirković	(United States) Orange County Blues FC	Loan	April 1, 2016	
42	FW	(Croatia) Adnan Gabeljic	(United States) San Francisco City FC		April 18, 2016	
10	FW	(Northern Ireland) Thomas Stewart	(Canada) Ottawa Fury FC		July 12, 2016	
10	FW	(England) Carlton Cole	(Indonesia) Persib Bandung		October 19, 2016	
18	MF	(United States) Ivan Mirković	(United States) St. Louis FC		November 10, 2016	
22	MF	(United States) Chase Minter	(United States) Real Monarchs		November 17, 2016	
17	MF	(Mexico) Octavio Guzman	(United States) St. Louis FC		November 22, 2016	
16	DF	(United States) Matt LaGrassa	(United States) Reno 1868 FC		December 20, 2016	
19	FW	(Canada) Mackenzie Pridham	(United States) Reno 1868 FC		December 21, 2016	
24	MF	(United States) JJ Koval	Retirement		December 21, 2016	
11	MF	(United States) Max Alvarez	(United States) St. Louis FC	Option Waived	December 31, 2016	
7	FW	(El Salvador) Joaquin Rivas	(United States) Tulsa Roughnecks		December 31, 2016	
2	DF	(Republic of Ireland) Derek Foran	(Republic of Ireland) Bray Wanderers FC		December 31, 2016	
14	FW	(United States) Cameron Iwasa	(United States) Sporting Kansas City		December 31, 2016	

=== Loan in ===
No.	Pos.	Player	Loaned from	Fee/notes	Date	Source
21	MW	(United States) Tommy Thompson	(United States) San Jose Earthquakes		March 24, 2016	
13	FW	(United States) Adam Jahn	(United States) San Jose Earthquakes		March 24, 2016	
26	FW	(United States) Mark Sherrod	(United States) San Jose Earthquakes		April 1, 2016	
27	FW	(New Zealand) Kip Colvey	(United States) San Jose Earthquakes		April 29, 2016	
28	MW	(Puerto Rico) Jeremy Hall	(United States) Tampa Bay Rowdies		July 24, 2016	
