= 2014 San Jose Earthquakes season =

San Jose Earthquakes
2014 season
- Owner: Earthquakes Soccer, LLC
- Coach: Mark Watson
- Stadium: Buck Shaw Stadium
- Major League Soccer: Conference: 9th (last); Overall: 18th
- MLS Cup Playoffs: Did not qualify
- U.S. Open Cup: Fifth Round
- California Clásico: 2nd (0-1-2)
- Heritage Cup: 1st (1-0-1)
- Central California Cup: 2nd (0–1–0)
- Rose City Invitational: 2nd (2–1–0)
- Top goalscorer: League: Chris Wondolowski (14); All: Chris Wondolowski (14)
- Highest home attendance: 50,006 v Los Angeles Galaxy (June 27, 2014)
- Lowest home attendance: 9,114 v Chivas USA (July 2, 2014)
- Average home league attendance: 14,947
Home colors	Away colors

The 2014 San Jose Earthquakes season was the club's 17th year of existence, as well as its 17th season in Major League Soccer and its 7th consecutive season in the top-flight of American soccer. Including all previous franchises, it was the 32nd year with a soccer club in the San Jose area sporting the name "Earthquakes".

It was the final season of the Earthquakes playing in Buck Shaw Stadium as the club would move into its new stadium for the 2015 season.

== Club ==
=== Roster ===
As of May 25, 2014.

No.	Position	Nation	Player
2	DF	USA	Ty Harden
3	DF	ENG	Jordan Stewart
4	MF	USA	Sam Cronin
5	DF	HON	Víctor Bernárdez (Vice-Captain)
6	MF	USA	Shea Salinas
7	MF	TTO	Cordell Cato
8	FW	USA	Chris Wondolowski (DP & Captain)
9	MF	JAM	Khari Stephenson
10	MF	POR	Yannick Djaló (on loan from S.L. Benfica)
11	FW	USA	Mike Fucito
13	GK	USA	Bryan Meredith
14	FW	USA	Adam Jahn
15	MF	USA	J. J. Koval
16	FW	USA	Alan Gordon
18	GK	USA	Jon Busch
19	DF	USA	Ryan Neil
20	DF	JAM	Shaun Francis
21	DF	USA	Jason Hernandez
22	FW	USA	Tommy Thompson (HGP)
23	MF	SKN	Atiba Harris
24	FW	USA	Steven Lenhart
25	DF	USA	Tommy Muller
26	DF	USA	Brandon Barklage
27	DF	USA	Joe Sofia
32	FW	USA	Billy Schuler
44	DF	USA	Clarence Goodson
77	DF	GER	Andreas Görlitz
80	MF	FRA	Jean-Baptiste Pierazzi

=== Out on loan ===
No.	Position	Nation	Player
1	GK	USA	David Bingham (GA; on loan to San Antonio Scorpions)
17	MF	USA	Sam Garza (GA; on loan to San Antonio Scorpions)
31	GK	USA	Billy Knutsen (on loan to Sacramento Republic FC)

== Club staff ==
Position	Staff
General Manager	(United States) John Doyle
Head Coach	(Canada) Mark Watson
Assistant Coach	(Canada) Nick Dasovic
Assistant Coach	(United States) Ian Russell
Goalkeeper Coach	(New Zealand) Jason Batty
Athletic Trainer	(United States) Brian Lee
Equipment Manager	(El Salvador) Jose Vega

As of January 25, 2014

== Other information ==
Owner	Earthquakes Soccer, LLC
Ground (capacity and dimensions)	Buck Shaw Stadium (10,525 / 74x115 yards)

Source: San Jose Earthquakes

== Competitions ==
Win Loss Tie

=== Preseason ===
February 5, 2014	San Jose Earthquakes	1–2	Seattle Sounders FC	Tucson, Arizona
10:00 AM PST	Schuler (yellow card) 2'; Lenhart (yellow card) 22'; Harris (yellow card) 51'; Fucito 86'	Report	Martins 27', 29'; Lowe (yellow card) 79'	Stadium: Kino Sports Complex

February 8, 2014	San Jose Earthquakes	1–3	Houston Dynamo	Tucson, Arizona
2:00 PM PST	Wondolowski 22'	Report	Cummings 66'; Seoane 29', (yellow card) 83'; Cascio 85'	Stadium: Kino Sports Complex

=== Central California Cup (preseason) ===
February 15, 2014	San Jose Earthquakes	1–2	LA Galaxy	Fresno, California
7:00 PM PST	Morton 67'	Report	Sarvas 31'; Leonardo (yellow card) 39'; Zardes 54'	Stadium: Chukchansi Park; Attendance: 12,659

=== Rose City Invitational (preseason) ===
Pos	Team	GP	W	L	D	GF	GA	GD	Pts
1	Vancouver Whitecaps FC	3	2	0	1	8	2	+6	7
2	San Jose Earthquakes	3	2	1	0	2	2	0	6
3	Portland Timbers	3	0	1	2	2	3	−1	2
4	Portmore United	3	0	2	1	2	7	−5	1

February 23, 2014	Portland Timbers	0–1	San Jose Earthquakes	Portland, Oregon
5:00 PM PST	Paparatto (yellow card) 60'	Report	Paparatto 26' (o.g.); Cronin (yellow card) 37'; Bernárdez (yellow card) 49'; Harris (yellow card) 56'; Stephenson (yellow card) 83'	Stadium: Providence Park; Attendance: 13,503

February 26, 2014	San Jose Earthquakes	0–2	Vancouver Whitecaps FC	Portland, Oregon
5:00 PM PST	Jahn (yellow card) 40'	Report	Miller 26'; Mattocks 88' (pen.)	Stadium: Providence Park

March 1, 2014	San Jose Earthquakes	1–0	Portmore United	Portland, Oregon
2:30 PM PST	Cato 39'	Report	Wilson (yellow card) 35'	Stadium: Providence Park

=== Preseason ===
March 5, 2014	San Jose Earthquakes	2–0	Sacramento Republic FC	Turlock, California
7:00 PM PST	Pierazzi (yellow card) 39'; Goodson (yellow card) 65'; Sofia (yellow card) 83'; Koval 86'; Schuler 90+1'	Report	Daly (yellow card) 17'	Stadium: Warrior Field

=== 2014 season ===
==== Results by round ====
Overall								Home						Away					
Pld	Pts	W	L	T	GF	GA	GD	W	L	T	GF	GA	GD	W	L	T	GF	GA	GD
30	29	6	13	11	35	44	−9	5	6	5	21	21	0	1	7	6	14	23	−9

Last updated: October 4, 2014
Source: MLSsoccer.com
Pld = Matches played; Pts = Points; W = Matches won; T = Matches tied; L = Matches lost; GF = Goals for; GA = Goals against; GD = Goal difference

Round	1	2	3	4	5	6	7	8	9	10	11	12	13	14	15	16	17	18	19	20	21	22	23	24	25	26	27	28	29	30	31	32	33	34
Stadium	H	A	H	H	A	H	A	H	H	A	H	A	A	H	H	H	A	H	H	A	H	A	A	H	A	A	H	A	A	H	A	A	H	A
Result	T	L	L	T	T	W	L	T	W	L	W	W	L	L	L	L	T	W	W	T	L	T	L	T	T	L	T	L	T	L	L	L	T	L

Updated to match(es) played on October 4, 2014. Source: MLS Results and League table
A = Away; H = Home; W = Win; L = Loss; T = Tie

==== Match results ====
March 15, 2014 Round 1	San Jose Earthquakes	3–3	Real Salt Lake	Santa Clara, California
7:30 PM PDT	Wondolowski 6'; Lenhart (yellow card) 9'; Bernárdez 75', 90+5'; Koval (yellow card) 77'; Salinas (yellow card) 90'	Report	Beckerman 11'; Plata 32'; Mulholland 45+4'; Borchers (yellow card) 52'	Stadium: Buck Shaw Stadium; Attendance: 1,847; Referee: Timothy Ford

March 22, 2014 Round 2	Sporting Kansas City	1–0	San Jose Earthquakes	Kansas City, Kansas
5:30 PM PDT	Sinovic (yellow card) 42'; Dwyer 57' (pen.); Nagamura (yellow card) 81'; Kronberg (yellow card) 83'	Report	Bernárdez (yellow card) 9'; Lenhart (yellow card) 39'; Goodson (yellow card) 57'	Stadium: Sporting Park; Attendance: 19,368; Referee: Ricardo Salazar

March 29, 2014 Round 3	San Jose Earthquakes	1–2	New England Revolution	Santa Clara, California
7:30 PM PDT	Wondolowski 69'	Report	Bernárdez 35' (o.g.); Kobayashi (yellow card) 51'; Tierney (yellow card) 63'; Nguyen 90+3'	Stadium: Buck Shaw Stadium; Attendance: 10,525; Referee: David Gantar

April 13, 2014 Round 4	San Jose Earthquakes	1–1	Columbus Crew	Santa Clara, California
12:00 PM PDT	Barklage (yellow card) 25'; Wondolowski 51'; Djaló (yellow card) 69'	Report	Añor (yellow card) 13'; González (yellow card) 15'; Higuaín 44'	Stadium: Buck Shaw Stadium; Attendance: 10,525; Referee: Kevin Stott

April 19, 2014 Round 5	Colorado Rapids	0–0	San Jose Earthquakes	Commerce City, Colorado
3:00 PM PDT		Report	Harris (yellow card) 25'; Jahn (red card) 87'	Stadium: Dick's Sporting Goods Park; Attendance: 12,306; Referee: Edvin Jurisevic

April 26, 2014 Round 6	San Jose Earthquakes	1–0	Chivas USA	Santa Clara, California
7:30 PM PDT	Stewart (yellow card) 9'; Gordon (yellow card) 17'; Cronin (yellow card) 22'; Djaló 66'	Report	Toia (yellow card) 27'; Minda (yellow card) 53'; Kennedy (red card) 77'	Stadium: Buck Shaw Stadium; Attendance: 10,525; Referee: Allen Chapman

May 3, 2014 Round 7	Vancouver Whitecaps FC	3–2	San Jose Earthquakes	Vancouver, BC
4:00 PM PDT	Manneh 10'; Morales 19' (pen.), 20', (yellow card) 20'	Report	Wondolowski 45' (pen.), 90+1'; Gordon (yellow card) 70'	Stadium: BC Place; Attendance: 21,000; Referee: Drew Fischer

May 7, 2014 Round 8	San Jose Earthquakes	0–0	Colorado Rapids	Santa Clara, California
7:30 PM PDT	Bernárdez (yellow card) 78'	Report	Eloundou (yellow card) 43'	Stadium: Buck Shaw Stadium; Attendance: 9,388; Referee: Ismail Elfath

May 10, 2014 Round 9	San Jose Earthquakes	2–1	FC Dallas	Santa Clara, California
7:30 PM PDT	Stewart (yellow card) 14'; Cato 25', (yellow card) 67'; Cronin (yellow card) 29'; Salinas (red card) 45'; Texeira 73' (o.g.); Fucito (yellow card) 81'	Report	Michel (yellow card) 72', (goal) 76'	Stadium: Buck Shaw Stadium; Attendance: 10,525; Referee: Chris Penso

May 17, 2014 Round 10	Seattle Sounders FC	1–0	San Jose Earthquakes	Seattle, WA
7:00 PM PDT	Martins 8'; Pineda (yellow card) 90'	Report		Stadium: CenturyLink Field; Attendance: 49,746; Referee: Jair Marrufo

May 25, 2014 Round 11	San Jose Earthquakes	3–0	Houston Dynamo	Santa Clara, California
7:30 PM PDT	Stephenson 38'; Stephenson 58' (pen.); Lenhart (yellow card) 60'; Harris 70'	Report		Stadium: Buck Shaw Stadium; Attendance: 10,525; Referee: Geoff Gamble

May 31, 2014 Round 12	FC Dallas	1–2	San Jose Earthquakes	Frisco, Texas
5:30 PM PDT	Pérez 16'; Moffat (yellow card) 25' (yellow-red card) 37'	Report	Harris 27'; Pierazzi 45'; Barklage (yellow card) 87'; Cato (yellow card) 89'	Stadium: Toyota Stadium; Attendance: 15,682; Referee: Jose Carlos Rivero

June 7, 2014 Round 13	Toronto FC	1–0	San Jose Earthquakes	Toronto, ON
1:00 PM PDT	Henry (yellow card) 17'; Defoe 27' (pen.), (yellow card) 90+3'; Hagglund (yellow card) 84'	Report	Cronin (yellow card) 60'; Goodson (yellow card) 66'	Stadium: BMO Field; Attendance: 22,591; Referee: Fotis Bazakos

June 28, 2014 Round 14	San Jose Earthquakes	0–1	LA Galaxy	Stanford, California
		Report	Zardes 61'; Gargan (yellow card) 67'; Donovan (yellow card) 90'	Stadium: Stanford Stadium; Attendance: 50,006; Referee: Baldomero Toledo

July 2, 2014 Round 15	San Jose Earthquakes	0–1	Chivas USA	Santa Clara, California
7:30 PM PDT	Stewart (yellow card) 21'; Pierazzi (yellow card) 62'	Report	Toia (yellow card) 42'; Torres 53'; Rosales (yellow card) 76'; Lochhead (yellow card) 88'; Burling (yellow card) 90+1'	Stadium: Buck Shaw Stadium; Attendance: 9,114; Referee: Ricardo Salazar

July 11, 2014 Round 16	San Jose Earthquakes	1–2	D.C. United	Santa Clara, California
8:00 PM PDT	Wondolowski 39'; Gordon (yellow card) 90+2'	Report	Johnson 12' (pen.) (yellow card) 87'; Silva 25'; Kitchen (yellow card) 71'	Stadium: Buck Shaw Stadium; Attendance: 10,525; Referee: Jair Marrufo

July 19, 2014 Round 17	New York Red Bulls	1–1	San Jose Earthquakes	Harrison, New Jersey
4:00 PM PDT	Wright-Phillips 33' (pen.); Cahill (yellow card) 70'; Olave (yellow card) 70'; Duvall (yellow card) 84'; Luyindula (yellow card) 90+4'	Report	Wondolowski (yellow card) 33'; Francis (yellow card) 45+1'; Lenhart (yellow card) 64' (goal) 85'; Salinas (yellow card) 78'	Stadium: Red Bull Arena; Attendance: 20,001; Referee: José Carlos Rivero

July 23, 2014 Round 18	San Jose Earthquakes	5–1	Chicago Fire	Santa Clara, California
8:00 PM PDT	Stewart (yellow card) 32'; Salinas 45'; Harris 52'; Wondolowski 62'; Djaló 79'; Cato 84'	Report	Segares (yellow card) 67'; Ward 75'; Fondy (yellow card) 81'	Stadium: Buck Shaw Stadium; Attendance: 10,525; Referee: Dave Gantar

August 2, 2014 Round 19	San Jose Earthquakes	1–0	Seattle Sounders FC	Santa Clara, California
7:30 PM PDT	Bernárdez (yellow card) 18'; Djaló 42'; Harris (yellow card) 78'; Hernandez (yellow card) 90+4'	Report	Scott (yellow card) 45+1'	Stadium: Levi's Stadium; Attendance: 48,765; Referee: Ismail Elfath

August 8, 2014 Round 20	LA Galaxy	2–2	San Jose Earthquakes	Carson, California
7:30 PM PDT	Zardes 29'; Gonzalez 49'	Report	Wondolowski 18'; García 31'; Francis (yellow card) 50'; Cronin (yellow card) 79'	Stadium: StubHub Center; Attendance: 19,719; Referee: Alan Kelly

August 16, 2014 Round 21	San Jose Earthquakes	0–5	FC Dallas	Santa Clara, California
7:30 PM PDT	Bernárdez (yellow card) 44'	Report	Castillo 30' 74'; Akindele 43' 58' 86'	Stadium: Buck Shaw Stadium; Attendance: 10,525; Referee: Jair Marrufo

August 20, 2014 Round 22	Seattle Sounders FC	1–1	San Jose Earthquakes	Seattle, WA
7:00 PM PDT	Yedlin (yellow card) 29'; Barrett 46'; Martins (yellow card) 77'	Report	Wondolowski 65'; Koval (yellow card) 90'	Stadium: CenturyLink Field; Attendance: 38,909; Referee: Drew Fischer

August 24, 2014 Round 23	Philadelphia Union	4–2	San Jose Earthquakes	Chester, Pennsylvania
5:00 PM PDT	Wenger 10' 79'; Le Toux 14' (yellow card) 67'; Williams 72'	Report	Cronin 59'; Wondolowski 70'	Stadium: PPL Park; Attendance: 17,421; Referee: Ted Unkel

August 30, 2014 Round 24	San Jose Earthquakes	1–1	Real Salt Lake	Santa Clara, California
7:30 PM PDT	Cronin 14'; Pierazzi (yellow card) 61'; Jason Hernandez (yellow card) 68'	Report	Morales 36' (pen.)	Stadium: Buck Shaw Stadium; Attendance: 10,525; Referee: David Gantar

September 7, 2014 Round 25	Portland Timbers	3–3	San Jose Earthquakes	Portland, Oregon
2:00 PM PDT	Powell 54' (yellow card) 88'; Johnson (yellow card) 56'; Ridgewell 74'; Alhassan 86'	Summary	Wondolowski 21' 85' (yellow card) 90+2'; Cato 48'; Francis (yellow card) 76'; Salinas (yellow card) 82'; Bernárdez (yellow card) 90'	Stadium: Providence Park; Attendance: 20,814; Referee: (United States) Allen Chapman

September 10, 2014 Round 26	Vancouver Whitecaps FC	2–0	San Jose Earthquakes	Vancouver, BC
7:00 PM PDT	Morales 39' (pen.); Watson 56'; Fernández (yellow card) 59'	Summary	Stewart (yellow card) 46'	Stadium: BC Place; Attendance: 17,183; Referee: (United States) Jose Rivero

September 14, 2014 Round 27	San Jose Earthquakes	1–1	LA Galaxy	Santa Clara, California
12:00 PM PDT	Hernandez (yellow card) 37'; Harris (yellow card) 63'; Lenhart (yellow card) 64'; Wondolowski 65'; Pierazzi (yellow card) 69'; Cronin (yellow card) 74'	Summary	Gonzalez (yellow card) 26' (goal) 28'; Rogers (yellow card) 60'; Marcelo Sarvas (yellow card) 75'; Keane (yellow card) 79'	Stadium: Buck Shaw Stadium; Attendance: 10,525; Referee: (United States) Sorin Stoica

September 20, 2014 Round 28	Montreal Impact	2-0	San Jose Earthquakes	Montreal, QC
4:30 PM PDT	McInerney 81'; Duka 88'	Summary		Stadium: Saputo Stadium; Attendance: 15,800; Referee: (United States) Daniel Fitzgerald

September 27, 2014 Round 29	Colorado Rapids	1-1	San Jose Earthquakes	Commerce City, Colorado
6:00 PM PDT	O'Neill (yellow card) 11'; Wynne (yellow card) 74'; Torres 84'	Summary	Pintos (yellow card) 23'; Harris (yellow card) 90+1' (goal) 90+4'	Stadium: Dick's Sporting Goods Park; Attendance: 15,634; Referee: (United States) Juan Guzman

October 4, 2014 Round 30	San Jose Earthquakes	1-2	Portland Timbers	Santa Clara, California
7:30 PM PDT	Hernandez (yellow card) 21'; Wondolowski 56'; Pintos (red card) 90+3'	Summary	Wallace 71' 74'; Villafaña (yellow card) 78'	Stadium: Buck Shaw Stadium; Attendance: 10,525; Referee: (United States) Kevin Stott

October 8, 2014 Round 31	Portland Timbers	3-0	San Jose Earthquakes	Portland, Oregon
7:30 PM PDT	Zemanski (yellow card) 20'; Wallace 41'; Valeri 51' 73'; Paparatto (yellow card) 65'	Summary	Francis (yellow card) 30'	Stadium: Providence Park; Attendance: 20,814; Referee: (United States) Baldomero Toledo

October 11, 2014 Round 32	Real Salt Lake	2-0	San Jose Earthquakes	Sandy, Utah
6:30 PM PDT	Grabavoy 24' (yellow card) 81'; Velásquez 28'	Summary	Djaló (yellow card) 32'; Harden (yellow card) 74'	Stadium: Rio Tinto Stadium; Attendance: 20,701; Referee: (United States) Jose Carlos Rivero

October 18, 2014 Round 33	San Jose Earthquakes	0-0	Vancouver Whitecaps FC	Santa Clara, California
7:30 PM PDT		Summary	Rosales (yellow card) 86'	Stadium: Buck Shaw Stadium; Attendance: 10,525; Referee: (Canada) Drew Fischer

October 26, 2014 Round 34	Chivas USA	1-0	San Jose Earthquakes	Carson, California
12:00 PM PDT	Borja 32'; Minda (yellow card) 51'	Summary	Bernárdez (yellow card) 66'	Stadium: StubHub Center; Attendance: 5571; Referee: (United States) Sorin Stoica

=== U.S. Open Cup ===
June 11, 2014 Fourth round	San Jose Earthquakes	2–1	Sacramento Republic FC	San Francisco, CA
7:30 PM PDT	Harris (yellow card) 32'; Stephenson 45' (pen.); Lenhart (yellow card) 47'; Cato 73'; Harden (yellow card) 83'; Pierazzi (yellow card) 90+2'	Report	Delbridge (yellow card) 3'; Braun 42'; Bartlomé (yellow card) 43' (yellow-red card) 77'	Stadium: Kezar Stadium; Attendance: 3,788; Referee: Juan Guzman

June 24, 2014 Fifth round	Seattle Sounders FC	1–1 (a.e.t.) (4–1 p)	San Jose Earthquakes	Tukwila, WA
7:30 PM PDT	Cooper 26'	Report	Harris (yellow card) 19'; Lenhart 24', (yellow card) 34'; Francis (yellow card) 49'; Gordon (yellow card) 113'	Stadium: Starfire Sports; Referee: Mark Kadlecik
	Penalties
	(penalty scored) Pineda; (penalty scored) Pappa; (penalty scored) Evans; (penalty scored) Neagle		Stephenson (penalty scored); Gordon (penalty missed); Koval (penalty missed)

=== CONCACAF Champions League ===
==== Championship Stage ====
March 11, 2014 First leg	San Jose Earthquakes (United States)	1–1	(Mexico) Toluca	Santa Clara, California
7:00 PM PDT	Bernárdez (yellow card) 31'; Salinas (yellow card) 90'; Pierazzi (yellow card) 90+1'; Gordon 90+5'	Report	Trejo (yellow card) 52'; Nava 67'; Galindo (yellow card) 85'	Stadium: Buck Shaw Stadium; Referee: Wálter Quesada

March 19, 2014 Second leg	Toluca (Mexico)	1–1 (a.e.t.) (5–4 p)	(United States) San Jose Earthquakes	Toluca, Mexico
5:00 PM PDT	Trejo (yellow card) 19'; Brizuela 69'; Brambila (yellow card) 112'	Report	Stephenson (yellow card) 14'; Harden 56'; Harris (yellow card) 67'; Busch (yellow card) 116'	Stadium: Estadio Nemesio Díez; Referee: Hector Rodriguez
	Penalties
	(penalty missed) Nava; (penalty scored) Ríos; (penalty scored) Velázquez; (penalty scored) Ponce; (penalty scored) Talavera; (penalty scored) Mathías		Wondolowski (penalty missed); Gordon (penalty scored); Cronin (penalty scored); Schuler (penalty scored); Koval (penalty scored); Salinas (penalty missed)

=== International Friendlies ===
July 27, 2014 Friendly	San Jose Earthquakes (United States)	0–0 (3–4 p)	(Spain) Atlético Madrid	San Francisco
4:00 PM PDT				Stadium: Candlestick Park; Attendance: 15,558
	Penalties
	Stephenson (penalty missed); Cronin (penalty scored); Schuler (penalty missed); Francis (penalty scored); Barklage (penalty scored)		(penalty scored) Siqueira; (penalty scored) Gabi; (penalty missed) Miranda; (penalty scored) Suárez; (penalty scored) Ñíguez

== Standings ==
=== Western Conference ===
Pos	Team	Pld	W	L	T	GF	GA	GD	Pts	Qualification
1	Seattle Sounders FC	34	20	10	4	65	50	+15	64	Qualification for the conference semifinals
2	LA Galaxy	34	17	7	10	69	37	+32	61	Qualification for the conference semifinals
3	Real Salt Lake	34	15	8	11	54	39	+15	56	Qualification for the conference semifinals
4	FC Dallas	34	16	12	6	55	45	+10	54	Qualification for the knockout round
5	Vancouver Whitecaps FC	34	12	8	14	42	40	+2	50	Qualification for the knockout round
6	Portland Timbers	34	12	9	13	61	52	+9	49	
7	Chivas USA	34	9	19	6	29	61	−32	33	
8	Colorado Rapids	34	8	18	8	43	62	−19	32	
9	San Jose Earthquakes	34	6	16	12	35	50	−15	30	

Source: MLS

=== Major League Soccer ===
Pos	Team	Pld	W	L	T	GF	GA	GD	Pts	Qualification
1	Seattle Sounders FC (S, U)	34	20	10	4	65	50	+15	64	Qualification for the CONCACAF Champions League
2	LA Galaxy (C)	34	17	7	10	69	37	+32	61	Qualification for the CONCACAF Champions League
3	D.C. United	34	17	9	8	52	37	+15	59	Qualification for the CONCACAF Champions League
4	Real Salt Lake	34	15	8	11	54	39	+15	56	Qualification for the CONCACAF Champions League
5	New England Revolution	34	17	13	4	51	46	+5	55	
6	FC Dallas	34	16	12	6	55	45	+10	54	
7	Columbus Crew	34	14	10	10	52	42	+10	52	
8	New York Red Bulls	34	13	10	11	55	50	+5	50	
9	Vancouver Whitecaps FC	34	12	8	14	42	40	+2	50	Qualification for the CONCACAF Champions League
10	Sporting Kansas City	34	14	13	7	48	41	+7	49	
11	Portland Timbers	34	12	9	13	61	52	+9	49	
12	Philadelphia Union	34	10	12	12	51	51	0	42	
13	Toronto FC	34	11	15	8	44	54	−10	41	
14	Houston Dynamo	34	11	17	6	39	58	−19	39	
15	Chicago Fire	34	6	10	18	41	51	−10	36	
16	Chivas USA	34	9	19	6	29	61	−32	33	
17	Colorado Rapids	34	8	18	8	43	62	−19	32	
18	San Jose Earthquakes	34	6	16	12	35	50	−15	30	
19	Montreal Impact (V)	34	6	18	10	38	58	−20	28	

Source: MLS
Rules for classification: 1) points; 2) head-to-head record; 3) goal difference; 4) number of goals scored
(C) MLS Cup champions; (S) Supporters' Shield winners; (U) U.S. Open Cup winners; (V) Canadian Championship winners

== Statistics ==
=== In ===
==== MLS Drafts ====
Pos.	Player	Transferred from	Notes	Date	Ref.
FW	(United States) Billy Schuler		Weighted lottery	January 14, 2014	
MF	(United States) J. J. Koval	(United States) Stanford Cardinal	2014 MLS SuperDraft Round 1 Pick 9	January 16, 2014	
DF	(United States) Joe Sofia	(United States) UCLA Bruins	2014 MLS SuperDraft Round 2 Pick 28	January 16, 2014	
MF	(United States) A. J. Corrado	(United States) Indiana Hoosiers	2014 MLS SuperDraft Round 3 Pick 47 (Unsigned)	January 21, 2014	
DF	(United States) Devonte Dubose	(United States) Virginia Tech Hokies	2014 MLS SuperDraft Round 4 Pick 66 (Unsigned)	January 21, 2014	
GK	(United States) Billy Knutsen	(United States) American Eagles	2014 MLS SuperDraft Round 4 Pick 74	January 21, 2014	
DF	(United States) Brandon Barklage	(United States) New York Red Bulls	2013 MLS Re-Entry Draft Stage 2 Round 1 Pick 9	January 22, 2014	
DF	(Jamaica) Shaun Francis	(United States) Chicago Fire	2013 MLS Re-Entry Draft Stage 2 Round 2 Pick 4	January 22, 2014	

==== Winter Transfer Window ====
Pos.	Player	Transferred from	Fee/notes	Date	Ref.
FW	(France) Jean-Baptiste Pierazzi	(France) AC Ajaccio		January 7, 2014	
MF	(Saint Kitts and Nevis) Atiba Harris	(United States) Colorado Rapids	Trade for Marvin Chávez	January 7, 2014	
	(United States) Tommy Thompson	(United States) Indiana Hoosiers	Homegrown Player	January 22, 2014	
GK	(United States) Bryan Meredith			January 24, 2014	
DF	(Germany) Andreas Görlitz			March 4, 2014	
DF	(United States) Ryan Neil			March 7, 2014	
FW	(Portugal) Yannick Djaló	(Portugal) S.L. Benfica	On loan	March 10, 2014	
MF	(Jamaica) Khari Stephenson	(United States) Real Salt Lake		March 11, 2014	

=== Out ===
No.	Pos.	Player	Transferred to	Fee/notes	Date	Ref.
15	DF	(United States) Justin Morrow	(Canada) Toronto FC	Traded for allocation money	December 17, 2013	
30	MF	(Mexico) Rafael Baca	(Mexico) Cruz Azul	Sold for undisclosed fee	December 23, 2013	
81	MF	(Honduras) Marvin Chávez	(United States) Colorado Rapids	Trade for Atiba Harris	January 7, 2014	
19	MF	(El Salvador) Jaime Alas		End of loan	January 15, 2014	
33	DF	(Iran) Steven Beitashour	(United States) Vancouver Whitecaps FC	Traded for allocation money	January 27, 2014	
10	MF	(Honduras) Walter Martínez		Waived	March 11, 2014	
