= Harry Williams (footballer, born 1996) =

English footballer

Personal information
- Full name: Harry John Robert Williams
- Date of birth: 17 January 1996 (age 30)
- Place of birth: Cirencester, England
- Height: 1.83 m (6 ft 0 in)
- Position: Forward

Team information
- Current team: Swindon Supermarine

Youth career
- 2012–2014: Cheltenham Town

Senior career*
Years	Team	Apps	(Gls)
2013–2016	Cheltenham Town	13	(0)
2013	→ Bishop's Cleeve (loan)		
2013	→ Farnborough (loan)	1	(0)
2014	→ Evesham United (loan)	7	(4)
2014	→ Gloucester City (loan)	7	(3)
2015	→ Farnborough (loan)	16	(10)
2015	→ Gloucester City (loan)	9	(4)
2016–2017	Sacramento Republic	41	(5)
2018–2019	Gloucester City	22	(4)
2019–2023	Swindon Supermarine	108	(57)
2021	→ Cirencester Town (loan)	4	(5)
2023	Gloucester City	12	(2)
2023–2024	Salisbury	12	(3)
2024–	Swindon Supermarine	0	(0)
- * Club domestic league appearances and goals as of 11:24, 31 January 2024 (UTC)

Harry John Robert Williams (born 17 January 1996) is an English footballer who plays for Swindon Supermarine as a forward.

== Career ==
=== Cheltenham Town ===
Williams was born in Cirencester, Gloucestershire, and began a scholarship with Cheltenham Town in July 2012. Williams previously was at Southside before being scouted at eight. Despite this, Williams remained at the club until he went on a six weeks trial with Cheltenham Town, which ultimately led him joining the club.

He is a product of the Cheltenham Town youth system, starting at the Academy in the Under 9's, making his first-team debut at the age of 17, on 22 October 2013, as a late substitute as Cheltenham beat Morecambe 3–0 in League Two. As a result of making his first team breakthrough at Cheltenham Town, Williams went on to win the club's Young Player of the Year and was honoured by the League Football Education. Additionally, Williams was nominated for Young Sports Personality of the year at the Gloucestershire Media Sports.

Following this reward Williams continued the second year of his scholarship, scoring a Cheltenham Town youth record 38 goals. Added to this he scored in every round of the FA Youth cup that the club participated in. This resulted in him being offered his first professional deal, signing two-year contract on 1 July 2014. After making eight more appearances in the 2014–15 season, Williams signed a contract extension with the club, keeping him until 2016.

On 9 December 2015 it was announced that Williams' contract will not be renewed at the end of the season.

=== Loan Spells from Cheltenham Town ===
In December 2013, Williams was loaned out to Conference South side Farnborough and made one appearance before returning to his parent club.

On 5 September 2014, Williams joined Evesham United on a one-month loan. The next day, Williams scored on his Evesham United debut, in a 1–1 draw against Wimborne Town. Williams then made his first start for Evesham United in the following game that saw them lose 3–1 against Didcot Town. After extending his loan for the second and third time, Williams went on to make eleven appearances for the club and scored five times before recalled by his parent club on 17 November 2014.

After his loan spell at Evesham United came to an end, Williams once again loaned out when he joined Gloucester City on 12 March 2015 for a one-month loan. Three days later, on 15 March 2015, Williams made his Gloucester City debut, making his first start, in a 1–0 loss against Boston United. Williams then scored his first Gloucester City goal, in a 3–1 win over Leamington on 5 April 2015. Williams soon extended his loan spell with the club until the end of the season and scored three times in seven appearances before being recalled in mid-April.

Prior to the 2015/16 campaign Williams, along with another Cheltenham Town youngster Bobbie Dale, joined Isthmian League Premier Division club Farnborough on loan until January. Williams went on to make ten appearances and scoring ten times, including scoring a hat-trick against Three Bridges on 21 October 2015. However, Williams was recalled by his parent club in late=October.

Shortly after ending his loan spell at Farnborough, Williams re-joined Gloucester City for the second time on 12 November 2015. Williams then re-debuted for the club on 14 November 2015, in a 1–0 loss against Lowestoft Town. Williams eventually scored four times in nine appearances before returning to his parent club on loan.

=== Sacramento Republic ===
After leaving Cheltenham Town, Williams moved to United States, signing for United Soccer League club Sacramento Republic in February 2016 where he reunited with former Cheltenham Town manager Paul Buckle.

After picking up a minor knee injury in pre-season, Williams eventually made his Sacramento Republic USL debut on 12 June 2016, in a 2–1 win over Real Monarchs. Williams then scored his first Sacramento Republic goal on 7 May 2016, in a 2–0 win against LA Galaxy II. Williams scored 4 goals during the regular season (a team high for a player of U23 age), with the 3rd goal being the winning goal versus Orange County Blues, a 2–1 win which secured a place in the playoffs for Sacramento Republic.

=== Return to Non-League ===
He rejoined Gloucester City in February 2018 on non-contract terms until the end of the 2017/2018 season. In February 2019, he signed for Southern Football League Premier Division South side Swindon Supermarine. In October 2021, he was loaned out to Southern League Division One South side Cirencester Town. When returning to the side after the loan spell at Cirencester, Williams shone scoring a further 16 goals for Swindon Supermarine that season. Fast forward to the 2022/2023 season, leading the way for the majority of the season, Williams ended up the joint top scorer in the Southern League Premier South, scoring 34 league goals in just 34 games (5 pens, 29 open play), with a further 5 goals in 7 Southern league cup and FA Cup appearances. Most impressively he scored 8 goals (home and away) against teams that ended up in the Top 5 places in the League. In May 2023, he returned to Gloucester City before joining Salisbury in November 2023.

== Career statistics ==
As of match played 3 May 2023

Appearances and goals by club, season and competition
Club	Season	League			National Cup (Note: Includes FA Cup, U.S. Open Cup)		League Cup		Other		Total	
Club	Season	Division	Apps	Goals	Apps	Goals	Apps	Goals	Apps	Goals	Apps	Goals
Cheltenham Town	2013–14	League Two	5	0	0	0	0	0	0	0	5	0
Cheltenham Town	2014–15	League Two	8	0	1	0	0	0	0	0	9	0
Cheltenham Town	2015–16	National League	0	0	—		—		—		0	0
Cheltenham Town	Total		13	0	1	0	0	0	0	0	14	0
Farnborough (loan)	2014–15	Conference South	1	0	—		—		—		1	0
Evesham United (loan)	2014–15	SL Division One South & West	7	4	—		—		3 (Note: Two appearances and one goal in FA Trophy, one in Southern Football League Cup)	1	10	5
Gloucester City (loan)	2014–15	Conference North	7	3	—		—		—		7	3
Farnborough (loan)	2015–16	IL Premier Division	10	3	2	1	—		2 (Note: Appearances in Isthmian League Cup)	3	14	7
Gloucester City (loan)	2015–16	National League North	9	4	—		—		2 (Note: Appearances in FA Trophy)	0	11	4
Sacramento Republic	2016	USL Championship	23	4	1	0	—		—		24	4
Sacramento Republic	2017	USL Championship	18	1	4	3	—		—		22	4
Sacramento Republic	Total		41	5	5	3	—		—		46	8
Gloucester City	2017–18	National League South	7	3	—		—		—		7	3
Gloucester City	2018–19	National League South	15	1	4	1	—		1	0	20	2
Gloucester City	Total		22	4	4	1	—		1	0	27	5
Swindon Supermarine	2018–19	SL Premier Division	8	1	—		—		1 (Note: Appearances in Wiltshire County FA Senior Cup)	1	9	2
Swindon Supermarine	2019–20	SL Premier Division	28	11	1	0	—		4 (Note: One appearance in FA Trophy, two appearances and one goal in Southern Football League Cup, one appearance and one goal in Wiltshire Premier Shield)	2	33	13
Swindon Supermarine	2020–21	SL Premier Division	6	2	2	0	—		2	0	10	2
Swindon Supermarine	2021–22	SL Premier Division	32	9	1	0	—		5 (Note: Two appearances and two goals in Southern Football League Cup, three appearances and five goals in Wiltshire Premier Shield)	7	38	16
Swindon Supermarine	2022–23	SL Premier Division	34	34	0	0	—		7	5	41	39
Cirencester Town (loan)	2021–22	SL Division One South	4	5	—		—		1	0	5	4
Career total			222	85	16	5	0	0	28	19	266	109

== Personal life ==
While playing in the America, Williams shared his apartment with teammate, Mackenzie Pridham.

Growing up in Charlton Kings, Cheltenham, England, Williams began playing football at age five and attended Glenfall Primary School and Balcarras School. While playing in America, Williams was nicknamed "Hack-A-Harry".
