= Tommy Thompson (soccer) =

American soccer player (born 1995)

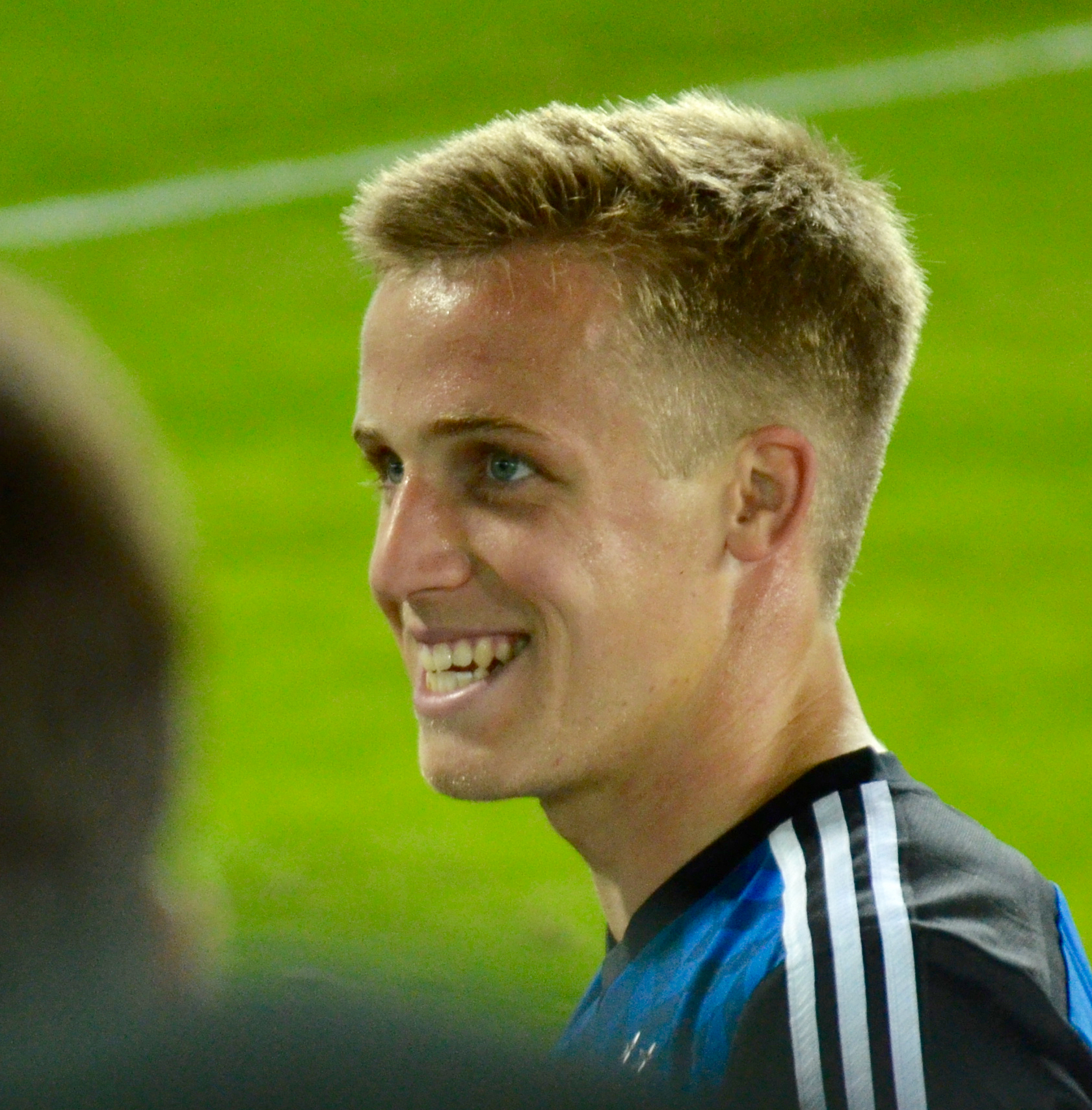
- Thompson with the San Jose Earthquakes in 2015

Personal information
- Full name: Thomas Palmer Thompson
- Date of birth: August 15, 1995 (age 31)
- Place of birth: Hinsdale, Illinois, United States
- Height: 5 ft 7 in (1.70 m)
- Position: Right-back

Youth career
- 2012–2013: San Jose Earthquakes

College career
Years	Team	Apps	(Gls)
2013	Indiana Hoosiers	16	(5)

Senior career*
Years	Team	Apps	(Gls)
2014–2024	San Jose Earthquakes	200	(5)
2014–2016	→ Sacramento Republic (loan)	19	(4)
2018	→ Reno 1868 (loan)	2	(0)
2025	Des Moines Menace	0	(0)

International career
2014–2015	United States U20	21	(3)
- * Club domestic league appearances and goals as of July 15, 2023

Thomas Palmer Thompson (born August 15, 1995) is an American professional soccer player who plays as a right-back.

== Career ==
Thompson played one year of college soccer at Indiana University where he scored five goals and one assist in 12 matches and was named Big Ten Freshman of the Year in 2013, before signing a Homegrown Player contract with San Jose Earthquakes on March 14, 2014.

Thompson made his professional debut on June 7, 2014, as an 89th-minute substitute in a 0–1 loss to Toronto FC.

On June 26, 2014, Thompson signed on loan with San Jose's USL Pro affiliate club Sacramento Republic FC.

Thompson recorded his first MLS assist in a 1–1 draw against Orlando City SC on May 17, 2017, coming off the bench in the 82nd minute to assist Chris Wondolowski's game-tying goal in the 83rd minute.

He scored his first MLS goal on July 4, 2017, in the 2nd minute of a 4–2 loss to Atlanta United FC at Bobby Dodd Stadium. Thompson's first goal came after making 64 MLS appearances over four years and logging 2,633 league minutes. On August 7, he was named to the MLS Team of the Week after recording his third assist of the season in the Earthquakes' 2–1 victory over Columbus Crew SC on August 5. He was announced as a nominee for the MLS Humanitarian of the Year Award on October 14, 2017. On October 22 he received San Jose's club award for Humanitarian of the Year after leading a number of youth clinics in the area and for actively aiding relief efforts in the wake of the 2017 California floods.

== Personal ==
Tommy's older brother is fellow soccer player Tanner, who played for Indy Eleven in the North American Soccer League. His father is American former professional soccer player Gregg Thompson.

== Statistics ==
As of July 15, 2023

Club	Season	League			National cup		Playoffs		Total	
Club	Season	Division	Apps	Goals	Apps	Goals	Apps	Goals	Apps	Goals
San Jose Earthquakes	2014	MLS	13	0	—		—		13	0
San Jose Earthquakes	2015	MLS	17	0	2	0	—		19	0
San Jose Earthquakes	2016	MLS	17	0	1	0	—		18	0
San Jose Earthquakes	2017	MLS	32	1	4	0	1	0	37	1
San Jose Earthquakes	2018	MLS	14	0	1	0	—		15	0
San Jose Earthquakes	2019	MLS	30	2	2	0	—		32	2
San Jose Earthquakes	2020	MLS	20	1	—		1	0	21	1
San Jose Earthquakes	2021	MLS	14	0	—		—		14	0
San Jose Earthquakes	2022	MLS	27	1	2	0	—		29	1
San Jose Earthquakes	2023	MLS	16	0	1	0	—		17	0
San Jose Earthquakes	Total		200	5	13	0	2	0	215	5
Sacramento Republic (loan)	2014	USL	6	0	—		—		6	0
Sacramento Republic (loan)	2015	USL	2	1	—		—		2	1
Sacramento Republic (loan)	2016	USL	11	3	—		—		11	3
Sacramento Republic (loan)	Total		19	4	—		—		19	4
Reno 1868 (loan)	2018	USL	2	0	—		—		2	0
Career totals			221	9	13	0	2	0	236	9

== Gallery ==
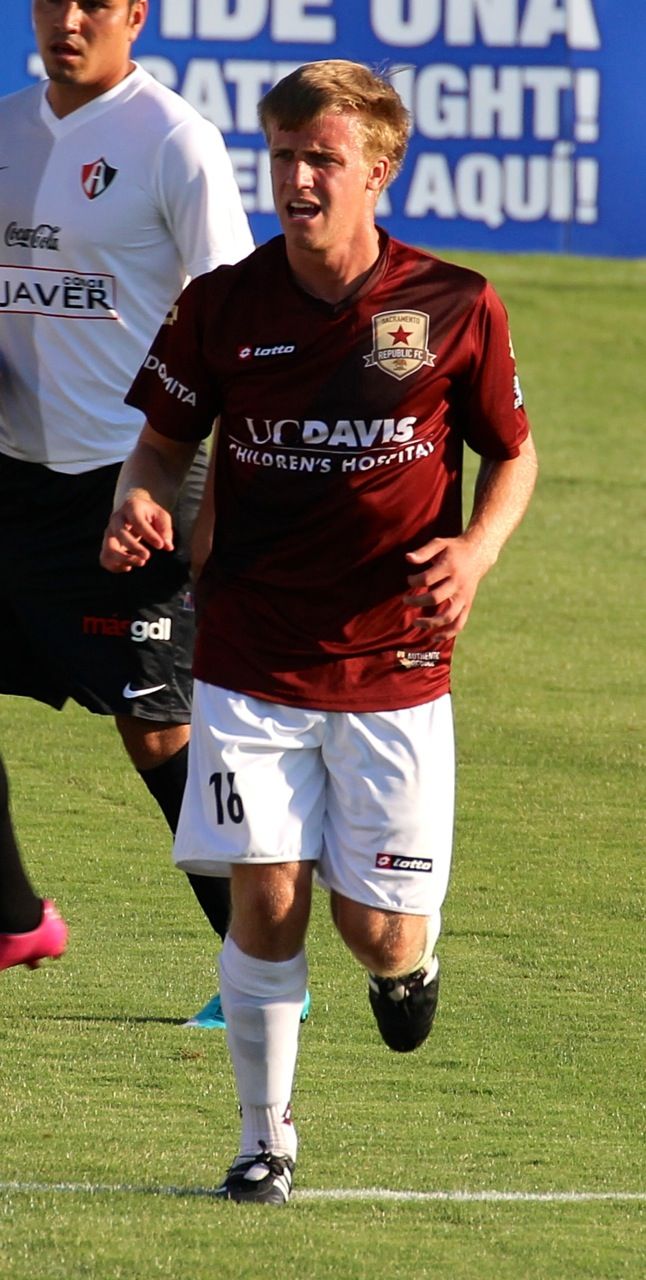
Playing for Sacramento Republic

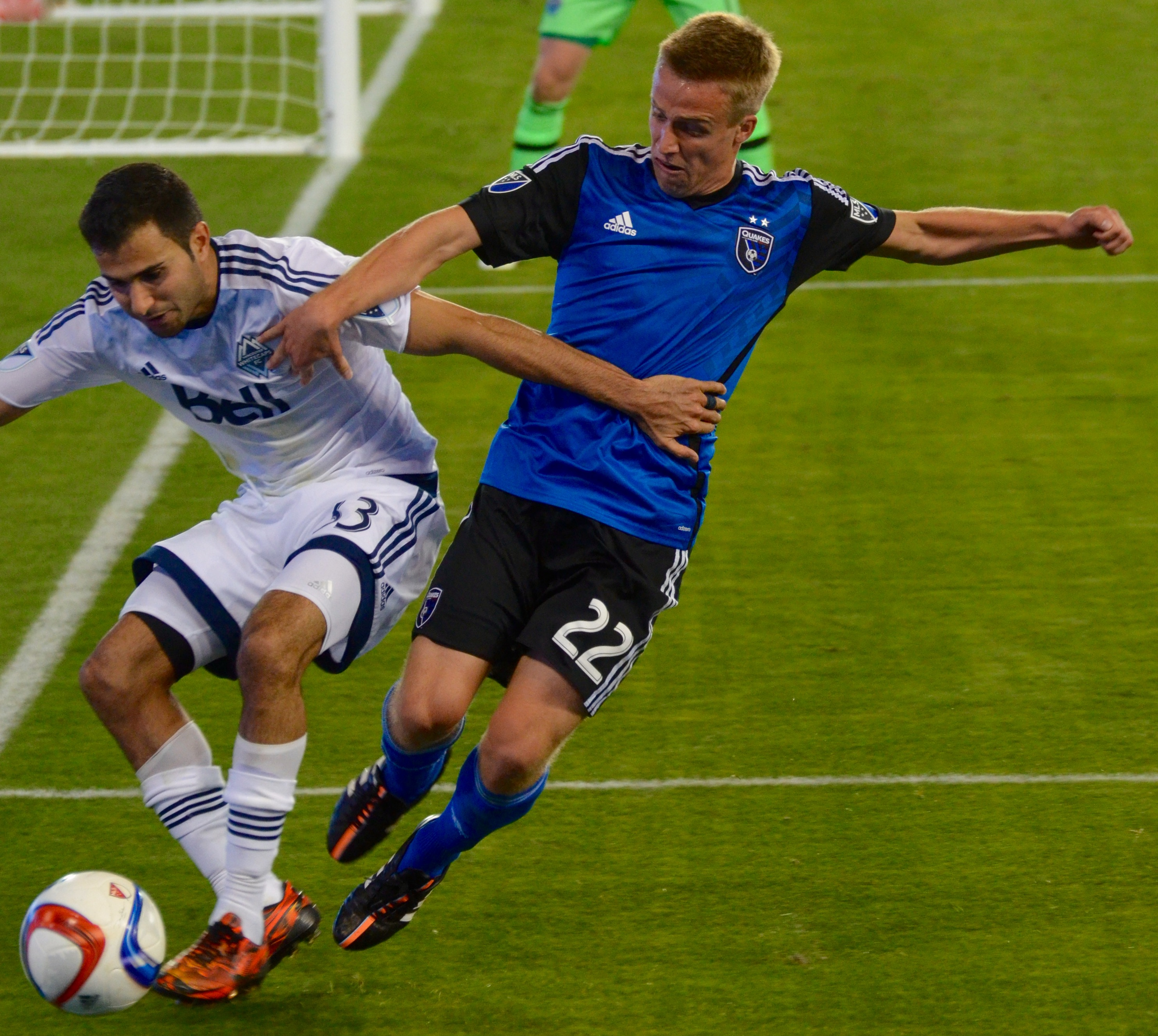
Battling Steven Beitashour for the ball

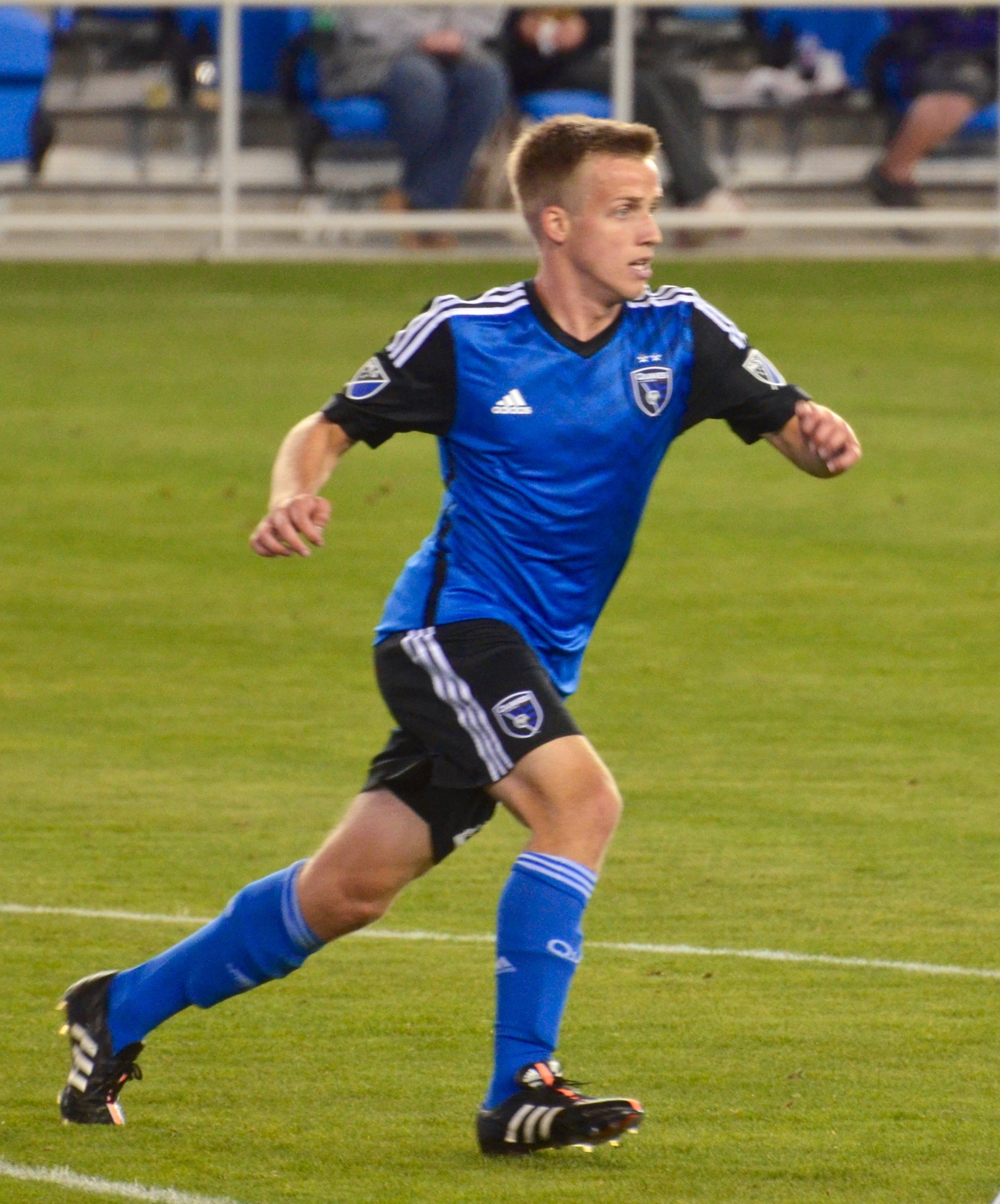
Playing at Avaya Stadium

== Honors ==
Sacramento Republic

- USL Cup: 2014
