= Daniel Trickett-Smith =

English footballer (born 1995)

Personal information
- Full name: Daniel Thomas Trickett-Smith
- Date of birth: 8 September 1995 (age 31)
- Place of birth: Newcastle-under-Lyme, England
- Height: 1.75 m (5 ft 9 in)
- Positions: Attacking midfielder; forward

Team information
- Current team: Hednesford Town

Youth career
- 20??–2012: Crewe Alexandra
- 2012–2016: Liverpool

Senior career*
Years	Team	Apps	(Gls)
2016–2017	Sacramento Republic	21	(2)
2017–2019	Leek Town	45	(17)
2019–2021	Port Vale	0	(0)
2019	→ Leek Town (loan)	11	(4)
2019	→ Curzon Ashton (loan)	6	(1)
2020	→ FC United of Manchester (loan)	5	(0)
2020	→ Leek Town (loan)	3	(3)
2021–2024	Leek Town	82	(41)
2024–	Hednesford Town	64	(12)

International career
2010	England U16	3	(0)
- * Club domestic league appearances and goals as of 19:12, 1 May 2026 (UTC)

Daniel Thomas Trickett-Smith (born 8 September 1995) is an English footballer who plays as an attacking midfielder for National League North club Hednesford Town.

Liverpool signed him from Crewe Alexandra for a fee of £300,000 in 2012, and he turned professional at the club the following year. He spent three years at Anfield without making a first-team appearance. He then spent two seasons with American United Soccer League side Sacramento Republic before returning to England to join Leek Town in September 2017. He was signed by Port Vale in January 2019 and loaned back to Leek Town.

He joined Curzon Ashton on loan in September 2019 to FC United of Manchester in February 2020 and again to Leek Town in October 2020. He featured in three cup games during his two-and-a-half seasons at Vale Park before rejoining Leek Town in July 2021. He played for Leek on the losing side of the 2023 and 2024 Staffordshire Senior Cup finals and helped the club to win the Northern Premier League Division One West title in the 2023–24 campaign. He joined Hednesford Town in June 2024 and helped the club to win both the Northern Premier League Division One West play-offs and Premier Division play-offs in 2025 and 2026.

== Club career ==
=== Liverpool ===
Trickett-Smith signed with Liverpool from Crewe Alexandra in the summer of 2012 for a fee of £300,000, with the potential to rise to £1 million. He initially did well for the "Reds", and was reported to be en route to manager Brendan Rodgers's first-team after he helped the youth team to reach the semi-finals of the FA Youth Cup. He signed professional forms at Anfield in July 2013. However, he then struggled with injuries and was released by new manager Jürgen Klopp after his contract expired in summer 2016.

"What has happened to Dan is a good example of what can happen [to young players who leave the club too soon]. He left us for Liverpool and it was a real shame because I think he would have played in our first-team. I just couldn't convince him and his dad that staying here was the best option."

— Former Crewe manager Dario Gradi speaking in June 2016.

=== Sacramento Republic ===
On 19 May 2016, Trickett-Smith signed with American United Soccer League side Sacramento Republic; head coach Paul Buckle said that "I have seen him train and he is a very, very talented player". He made his competitive debut ten days later in a 1–1 draw with Swope Park Rangers at Bonney Field. He scored his first goal for the "Quails" in a 6–2 victory over Rio Grande Valley on 22 June. This was his only goal in nine competitive appearances during the 2016 season. He featured 14 times in the 2017 season, scoring two goals. He was released by mutual consent on 18 August 2017.

=== Leek Town ===
Upon his return to England in September 2017, Trickett-Smith signed for Northern Premier League Division One South side Leek Town, who were managed by former Crewe coach Neil Baker. He made his debut on 16 September, coming on as a 76th-minute substitute for Niall Maguire in a 0–0 with Spalding United at Harrison Park. He scored his first goals for the "Blues" ten days later, securing a brace in a 3–0 victory over Sheffield. He ended the 2017–18 season with 13 goals in 38 league and cup appearances. He opened the 2018–19 season with a brace in a 4–0 win at Skelmersdale United. He went on to score a hat-trick in a 4–1 New Years Day win over Newcastle Town.

=== Port Vale ===
On 31 January 2019, Trickett-Smith joined EFL League Two side Port Vale on a deal to run until summer 2021 before being loaned back to Leek Town for the rest of the season. He was named on the Northern Premier League West Division team of the season for the 2018–19 campaign, alongside Leek teammate Danny Roberts. Leek reached the play-off final after finishing third in the league, but were beaten 2–1 by Radcliffe to miss out on promotion.

Speaking in July 2019, manager John Askey said that he would look to loan Trickett-Smith to a higher-level club than Leek Town. On 13 September, Trickett-Smith joined National League North side Curzon Ashton on a two-month loan. He made a brief cameo for the "Nash" the following day, before scoring a long-range strike on his full debut on 28 September, in a 2–1 defeat at Farsley Celtic. During this loan spell he also made his debut for the "Valiants" in a 2–1 victory over Newcastle United U21 in an EFL Trophy group stage game at Vale Park on 11 November. On 21 February 2020, he went out on loan to Northern Premier League Premier Division side FC United of Manchester.

On 13 October 2020, Trickett-Smith returned to former club Leek Town on loan for the first half of the 2020–21 season. He scored three goals in five games before the Northern Premier League was suspended due to restrictions put in place because of the COVID-19 pandemic in England. He was not registered in the EFL squad for Port Vale during the second half of the 2020–21 season and was released by new manager Darrell Clarke in May 2021.

=== Return to Leek Town ===
Trickett-Smith returned to Leek Town permanently after his release from Port Vale. He scored 19 goals in 38 appearances throughout the 2021–22 campaign. He was the joint-third highest goalscorer in the Northern Premier League Division One West, but could not prevent Leek losing 4–1 to Runcorn Linnets in the play-off semi-finals. He scored seven goals in 42 games across the 2022–23 season, including an appearance in the Staffordshire Senior Cup final defeat to Rushall Olympic and in the play-off semi-final defeat to Runcorn Linnets. Leek were crowned Northern Premier League Division One West champions at the end of the 2023–24 season. He scored 19 goals in 32 games during the campaign, including another appearance in the Staffordshire Senior Cup final where Leek again lost 1–0 to Rushall Olympic.

=== Hednesford Town ===
On 16 June 2024, Trickett-Smith signed with Hednesford Town to remain in the crowned Northern Premier League Division One West. He played in the FA Cup win over National League club Gateshead. The cup run came to and end in the first round Poper with a penalty shoot-out defeat to Gainsborough Trinity. He scored 13 goals across 54 appearances in the 2024–25 campaign, including an appearance in the play-off final victory over Congleton Town. He played 24 league games in the 2025–26 season. He was a stoppage-time substitute in the play-off final win over Warrington Rylands 1906 at Keys Park.

== International career ==
Trickett-Smith made three appearances for England under 16s.

== Career statistics ==
As of match played 4 May 2026

Appearances and goals by club, season and competition
Club	Season	League			National cup (Note: Includes U.S. Open Cup, FA Cup)		League cup (Note: Includes EFL Cup)		Other		Total	
Club	Season	Division	Apps	Goals	Apps	Goals	Apps	Goals	Apps	Goals	Apps	Goals
Sacramento Republic	2016	United Soccer League	8	1	1	0	–		0	0	9	1
Sacramento Republic	2017	United Soccer League	13	1	1	1	–		0	0	14	2
Sacramento Republic	Sacramento Republic total		21	2	2	1	0	0	0	0	23	3
Leek Town	2017–18	Northern Premier League; Division One South	33	11	0	0	1	0	4 (Note: Appearances in the Staffordshire Senior Cup and FA Trophy.)	2	38	13
Leek Town	2018–19	Northern Premier League; Division One West	23	10	4	4	1	0	3 (Note: Appearances in the Staffordshire Senior Cup and in the play-offs.)	0	31	14
Port Vale	2018–19	League Two	0	0	–		–		–		0	0
Port Vale	2019–20	League Two	0	0	0	0	0	0	1 (Note: Appearance(s) in EFL Trophy)	0	1	0
Port Vale	2020–21	League Two	0	0	0	0	1	0	1	0	2	0
Port Vale	Port Vale total		0	0	0	0	1	0	2	0	3	0
Curzon Ashton (loan)	2019–20	National League North	6	1	0	0	–		0	0	6	1
FC United of Manchester (loan)	2019–20	Northern Premier League; Premier Division	5	0	0	0	0	0	0	0	5	0
Leek Town (loan)	2020–21	Northern Premier League; Division One East	3	3	0	0	0	0	2 (Note: Appearance(s) in the FA Trophy)	0	5	3
Leek Town	2021–22	Northern Premier League; Division One West	34	18	2	1	0	0	2 (Note: 1 appearance in the FA Trophy and 1 appearance in the play-offs)	0	38	19
Leek Town	2022–23	Northern Premier League; Division One West	34	7	1	0	0	0	7 (Note: 4 appearances in the FA Trophy, 2 appearances in the Staffordshire Senior Cup and 1 appearance in the play-offs)	0	42	7
Leek Town	2023–24	Northern Premier League; Division One West	24	16	5	3	0	0	4 (Note: 2 appearances in the FA Trophy and 2 appearances in the Staffordshire Senior Cup)	0	33	19
Leek Town	Leek Town total		151	65	12	8	2	0	22	2	144	75
Hednesford Town	2024–25	Northern Premier League; Division One West	40	11	8	1	0	0	6 (Note: 2 appearances in the FA Trophy, 1 appearances in the Birmingham Senior Cup, 1 appearances in the Walsall Senior Cup and 2 appearances and 1 goal in the play-offs)	1	54	13
Hednesford Town	2025–26	Northern Premier League; Premier Division	24	1	3	1	0	0	3 (Note: 1 appearance in the FA Trophy and 2 appearances in the play-offs)	0	30	2
Hednesford Town	2026–27	National League North	0	0	0	0	0	0	0	0	0	0
Hednesford Town	Hednesford Town total		64	12	11	2	0	0	9	1	84	15
Career total			247	80	25	11	3	0	35	3	310	94

== Honours ==
Individual

- Northern Premier League West Division team of the season: 2018–19

Leek Town

- Staffordshire Senior Cup runner-up: 2023, 2024
- Northern Premier League Division One West: 2023–24

Hednesford Town

- Northern Premier League Division One West play-offs: 2025
- Northern Premier League Premier Division play-offs: 2026
