= Jeremy Hall (footballer) =

Puerto Rican football player and manager

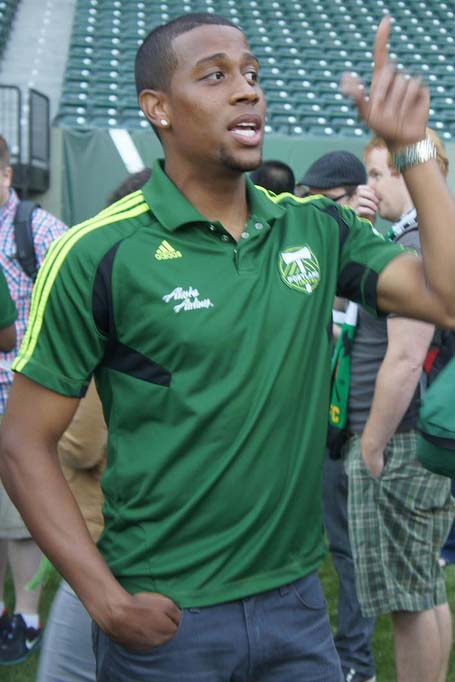

Personal information
- Full name: Jeremy Michael Hall
- Date of birth: September 11, 1988 (age 38)
- Place of birth: Tampa, Florida, U.S.
- Height: 1.80 m (5 ft 11 in)
- Positions: Midfielder; defender

Youth career
- –2003: Hillsborough County
- 2003–2005: IMG Soccer Academy

College career
Years	Team	Apps	(Gls)
2006–2008	Maryland Terrapins	66	(26)

Senior career*
Years	Team	Apps	(Gls)
2009–2010	New York Red Bulls	37	(0)
2011	Portland Timbers	17	(0)
2011	FC Dallas	4	(0)
2012–2014	Toronto FC	57	(2)
2014	→ Wilmington Hammerheads (loan)	3	(0)
2015	New England Revolution	12	(0)
2016	Tampa Bay Rowdies	0	(0)
2016	→ Sacramento Republic (loan)	11	(0)
2017–2018	Sacramento Republic	64	(4)
2021	1812 FC Barrie	4	(0)

International career^{‡}
2003–2005	United States U17	26	(5)
2007	United States U18	9	(0)
2016–2018	Puerto Rico	7	(0)

Managerial career
- 2022–2024: Minnesota United 2 (assistant)
- 2024–2025: Minnesota United 2
- * Club domestic league appearances and goals as of September 23, 2021 ‡ National team caps and goals as of September 1, 2021

Jeremy Michael Hall (born September 11, 1988) is a football manager and former professional player who currently works as head coach for Minnesota United FC 2 in the MLS Next Pro. He operated as a midfielder or defender. Born in the mainland United States, he played for the Puerto Rico national team.

== Career ==
=== College ===
Before joining the national under-17 residency program, Hall played for local club Hillsborough County United. Hall played college soccer at the University of Maryland, where he won the 2009 NCAA Division I Championship. During his college career Hall was a two-time NSCAA/Adidas All-American, a USYSA All-American in 2005, and a two-time Parade All-American. In three years at Maryland, he appeared in 66 games, scoring 26 goals and assisting on 14.

=== Professional ===
Hall was drafted in the first round (11th overall) of the 2009 MLS SuperDraft by the New York Red Bulls. He made his MLS debut on 19 March 2009, in the 2009 season opener against Seattle Sounders FC. During his first season with New York, Hall appeared in 24 regular season matches playing primarily as a right back. At the conclusion of his first season with New York, Hall went on to train with sister club Red Bull Salzburg.

On 20 March 2010, Hall started and played the full 90 minutes for Red Bulls in a 3–1 victory against Santos FC, which was the first match played at the new Red Bull Arena. On May 23, 2010, Hall scored New York's opening goal in a 3–1 victory over Italian side Juventus FC in a friendly played at Red Bull Arena. On October 21, 2010, Hall started at left back helping New York to a 2–0 victory over New England Revolution which helped New York clinch its second regular season Eastern Conference title.

It was announced on November 22, 2010, that Hall had been traded to 2011 expansion team Portland Timbers in exchange for a 3rd round pick in the 2011 SuperDraft. Hall was a regular starter for Portland before being traded to FC Dallas on August 19, 2011, in exchange for midfielder Eric Alexander.

Hall was traded to Toronto FC on November 29, 2011, in exchange for a second round pick in the 2013 MLS SuperDraft. Hall made his debut as a second half sub for Torsten Frings in a 2–0 home defeat to D.C. United. Hall scored his first professional goal on June 20, 2012, against Houston Dynamo, the game ended in a 3–3 away draw.

In December 2014, Hall was traded by Toronto to New England Revolution in exchange for a fourth-round pick in the 2015 MLS SuperDraft. Hall made 12 appearances for New England in 2015, logging 998 minutes.

On February 8, 2016, it was announced the Hall had signed one-year contract through the 2016 NASL season with his hometown Tampa Bay Rowdies. The contract has a club option for the 2017 season as well. On July 21, 2016, Hall joined United Soccer League side Sacramento Republic on loan.

On July 31, 2021, ahead of 1812 FC Barrie's inaugural match, Hall was announced as the League1 Ontario club's first signing.

=== International ===
He has been a member of the U.S. Soccer Residency program since 2003, and has earned 22 caps with the U-17 team, including games at the 2005 FIFA U-17 World Championship in Peru, where he made six starts and scored one goal against the Ivory Coast U-17s. He has also represented the United States at the U-20 level.

In May 2016, Hall was called up to the Puerto Rico national football team for a friendly against the United States in Bayamón, Puerto Rico. Hall qualified to play for the Puerto Rican team by way of his Puerto Rican grandparents. He played the second round of the 2017 Caribbean Cup helping Puerto Rico reach the third round and being only two games away from reaching the 2017 CONCACAF Gold Cup for the first time.

He continued to play with the team in matches against Orlando City SC in 2017 and the CONCACAF Nations League until 2018.

=== Coaching ===
In March 2022, Hall was named to the inaugural staff for Minnesota United 2 in MLS Next Pro. Hall was elevated to head coach for the side in April 2024.

== Career statistics ==
As of September 23, 2021

Club statistics
Club	Season	League			Playoffs		Domestic Cup		Continental		Total	
Club	Season	Division	Apps	Goals	Apps	Goals	Apps	Goals	Apps	Goals	Apps	Goals
New York Red Bulls	2009	Major League Soccer	24	0	—		2	0	2	0	28	0
New York Red Bulls	2010	Major League Soccer	13	0	2	0	3	0	—		18	0
Portland Timbers	2011	Major League Soccer	17	0	—		2	0	—		19	0
FC Dallas	2011	Major League Soccer	4	0	0	0	0	0	4	0	8	0
Toronto FC	2012	Major League Soccer	23	1	—		3	0	3	0	29	1
Toronto FC	2013	Major League Soccer	31	1	—		1	0	—		32	1
Toronto FC	2014	Major League Soccer	3	0	—		2	0	—		7	1
Wilmington Hammerheads (loan)	2014	USL Pro	3	0	0	0	0	0	—		3	0
New England Revolution	2015	Major League Soccer	12	0	0	0	1	0	—		13	0
Tampa Bay Rowdies	2016	North American Soccer League	0	0	—		0	0	—		0	0
Sacramento Republic (loan)	2016	United Soccer League	11	0	1	0	0	0	—		12	0
Sacramento Republic	2017	United Soccer League	31	2	2	0	4	1	—		37	2
Sacramento Republic	2018	United Soccer League	33	2	1	0	3	0	—		37	1
1812 FC Barrie	2021	League1 Ontario	4	0	—		—		—		4	0
Career total			209	6	6	0	21	1	9	0	245	7

== Honors ==
=== University of Maryland ===
- NCAA Men's Division I Soccer Championship (1): 2008

=== Toronto FC ===
- Canadian Championship (1): 2012
