= Peter McGlynn =

Irish footballer

Personal information
- Full name: Peter Fergus McGlynn
- Date of birth: 2 May 1989 (age 37)
- Place of birth: Dublin, Ireland
- Height: 5 ft 11 in (1.80 m)
- Position: Full back

Youth career
- 1997–2000: Skerries Town
- 2000–2008: Shelbourne

College career
Years	Team	Apps	(Gls)
2008–2012	UC Santa Barbara Gauchos	77	(2)

Senior career*
Years	Team	Apps	(Gls)
2012	Ventura County Fusion	9	(0)
2013	San Jose Earthquakes	0	(0)
2014	Drogheda United	9	(1)
2015	Bray Wanderers	23	(3)
2016	Longford Town	23	(2)
2017	Sacramento Republic	7	(0)
- * Club domestic league appearances and goals as of 23:18, 20 October 2017 (UTC)

Peter Fergus McGlynn (born 2 May 1989) is an Irish footballer. Besides the Republic of Ireland, he has played in the United States.

== Early life and education ==
McGlynn played five years of college soccer at the University of California, Santa Barbara between 2008 and 2012, including a redshirted year in 2011 due to a season-ending injury. During a match against UC Davis Aggies in 2012, McGlynn was arrested and escorted from the field in handcuffs after he had assaulted the referee.

== Playing career ==
While at college McGlynn appeared for Premier Development League side Ventura County Fusion in 2012.

On 22 January 2013 McGlynn was selected in the fourth round (72nd overall) of the 2012 MLS Supplemental Draft by San Jose Earthquakes. He signed with San Jose on 15 February 2013.

Following his release by San Jose at the end of the 2013 season, McGlynn returned to Ireland and spent time with Drogheda United, Bray Wanderers and Longford Town. McGlynn again headed to the United States on 16 November 2016, when he signed for United Soccer League side Sacramento Republic.
