= Wilson Kneeshaw =

English footballer

Personal information
- Full name: Wilson Edgar James Kneeshaw
- Date of birth: 17 May 1994 (age 32)
- Place of birth: Darlington, England
- Position: Forward

Team information
- Current team: Ashington

Youth career
- 2005–2014: Middlesbrough

Senior career*
Years	Team	Apps	(Gls)
2014–2015	ACS Poli Timișoara	8	(0)
2015	Darlington 1883	1	(0)
2015–2016	Blyth Spartans	20	(8)
2016–2018	Sacramento Republic	54	(10)
2019	Darlington	11	(1)
2021–2022	Newcastle Independent	21	(24)
2022	Shildon	12	(1)
2023–	Ashington	68	(15)
- * Club domestic league appearances and goals as of 10:29, 17 March 2025 (UTC)

Wilson Edgar James Kneeshaw (born 17 May 1994) is an English footballer who plays as a forward for Ashington.

== Club career ==
Kneeshaw began his career in Middlesbrough's youth system before playing for ACS Poli Timișoara in Liga I, the Romanian top division. He then appeared for Darlington 1883 and Blyth Spartans in English non-league football and for United Soccer League team Sacramento Republic.

He joined National League North club Darlington in February 2019 on a short-term deal, and made 11 appearances before a ruptured Achilles tendon put a premature end to his season.

During the 2021–22 season, Kneeshaw featured for Northern Football Alliance side Newcastle Independent as they lifted the Division One league title. A year later, in June 2022, he then moved to Northern Football League side Shildon.

In August 2023, Kneeshaw joined Ashington.

== Personal life ==
Kneeshaw's brother Jackson featured on the British reality TV series Ibiza Weekender.
