= Cameron Iwasa =

American soccer player (born 1993)

Personal information
- Full name: Cameron Toshiro Iwasa
- Date of birth: July 7, 1993 (age 33)
- Place of birth: Sacramento, California, United States
- Height: 1.78 m (5 ft 10 in)
- Position: Forward

College career
Years	Team	Apps	(Gls)
2011–2014	UC Irvine Anteaters	85	(22)

Senior career*
Years	Team	Apps	(Gls)
2014	OC Pateadores Blues	9	(2)
2015–2016	Sacramento Republic	47	(13)
2017	Sporting Kansas City	0	(0)
2017	→ Swope Park Rangers (loan)	22	(2)
2018–2021	Sacramento Republic	114	(45)
Total		192	(62)
- * Club domestic league appearances and goals as of November 8, 2021

Cameron Toshiro Iwasa (born July 7, 1993) is an American former professional soccer player.

== Career ==
=== College and amateur ===
Iwasa spent his entire college career at UC Irvine. He made a total of 85 appearances for the anteaters and tallied 22 goals and 14 assists.

He also played in the Premier Development League for OC Pateadores Blues.

=== Professional ===
On January 20, 2015, Iwasa was selected in the fourth round (65th overall) of the 2015 MLS SuperDraft by the Montreal Impact. However, he was cut during training camp and offered a contract with Montreal's USL affiliate, which he declined. Two months later, he signed a professional contract with his hometown club Sacramento Republic FC. He made his professional debut the following day in a 4–2 defeat to Seattle Sounders FC 2.

Iwasa signed with Major League Soccer side Sporting Kansas City on January 10, 2017.

Iwasa returned to Sacramento Republic FC for the 2018 season on December 22, 2017.

During the final game of the season, Iwasa scored his 60th USL goal, securing a tie in the match. Following the 2021 season, Iwasa announced his retirement from playing professional soccer.

== Personal life ==
Iwasa was raised in Sacramento's College Greens neighborhood. His grandfather is of Japanese descent.
