= James Kiffe =

American soccer player

Personal information
- Full name: James Alexander Kiffe
- Date of birth: January 24, 1989 (age 37)
- Place of birth: Santa Barbara, California, United States
- Height: 5 ft 11 in (1.80 m)
- Position: Defender

Youth career
- San Marcos Royals

College career
Years	Team	Apps	(Gls)
2007	SBCC Vaqueros		(9)
2009–2011	UC Santa Barbara Gauchos	45	(3)

Senior career*
Years	Team	Apps	(Gls)
2011–2014	Ventura County Fusion	31	(3)
2014–2017	Sacramento Republic	89	(2)
2018	Reno 1868	7	(0)
2018	Charlotte Independence	3	(0)
2019	El Paso Locomotive	31	(0)
- * Club domestic league appearances and goals as of October 25, 2019

James Alexander Kiffe (born January 24, 1989) is an American soccer player.

== Early life and education ==
Kiffe was born on January 24, 1989, in Santa Barbara, California. He played for local side Santa Barbara Soccer Club before playing high school soccer at San Marcos High School. He played for Santa Barbara City College in 2007 before transferring to the University of California, Santa Barbara.

While enrolled at UC Santa Barbara, he was a student-athlete on the UC Santa Barbara Gauchos men's soccer team from 2009 to 2011. As a sophomore, he appeared as a substitute in 3 games and assisted on 1 goal. His junior year saw him start 12 of his 20 appearances en route to 1 goal and 4 assists. In his final year in Santa Barbara, Kiffe started 21 of the 22 games he played in and scored 2 goals and 6 assists. He ended his UCSB career with a total of 45 games played and 3 goals scored and was named the Big West Conference Defender of the Year for 2011.

== Career ==
While enrolled at UCSB, Kiffe played with Ventura County Fusion of the PDL. After his senior season, he was selected in round four of the 2012 MLS Supplemental Draft by the San Jose Earthquakes. He didn't make the Earthquakes roster and spent much of 2012 recuperating from a high ankle injury sustained at the end of his senior year at UCSB. In 2013 he continued his rehabilitation and played with the Fusion. In the fall of 2013, he went on trial with a team based in Slovenia which also didn't produce a professional contract. At the insistence of Sporting Kansas City, Kiffe returned to the United States to find that the club had signed a different player for the 2014 season. He continued to play with the Fusion in 2014, ultimately serving as their longest-tenured player and team captain.

After seeing Kiffe play for the Fusion against Sacramento Republic FC in the 2014 Lamar Hunt U.S. Open Cup and the 2014 PDL playoffs, Sacramento Republic signed Kiffe for the remainder of the 2014 USL Pro season.

2014: Signed with Republic FC before the USL Roster Freeze Deadline ... Started the final four regular season matches and started all three of Republic FC's playoff matches ... Recorded two assists in the playoffs including Thomas Stewart's 90th-minute goal in the USL Championship Match on September 27 ... Was named to the USL Team of the Week in week 25.

2015: Appeared in 29 matches for Republic FC in all competitions, including 24 USL appearances ... Recorded an assist on the season.

2016: Made 36 appearances for Republic FC in all competitions, including 29 USL matches. He scored a goal and added five assists in USL play, second-most on the club. His goal was his first as a professional and was a match-winning goal over Oklahoma City Energy FC on Aug. 2. He recorded his first 2,000+ USL minute season, playing 2,527 minutes, second-most of any Republic FC player in 2016.

2017: Played every minute of Republic FC's 2017 regular season and postseason, recording 3,090 total minutes. Kiffe broke the 100-appearance mark played with Republic FC on Sept. 2 against Colorado Switchbacks FC, becoming only the second player to achieve this feat. He also made his 100th career start for Republic FC on Sept. 30 against Phoenix Rising FC. Kiffe held 61 key passes and 64 interceptions this season. The 28-year-old defender recorded a career-high six assists in the regular season and had a 75.6 percent tackle success rate and 79.5 percent pass success rate, completing 1,189 successful passes. The defender also scored one of the penalty kicks during Republic FC's Western Conference Quarterfinals penalty shootout against Real Monarchs, which helped the club advance to the conference semifinals. Kiffe was named to the 2017 USL All-League Second Team. Kiffe was in the running "Defender of the Year" in 2017 and he was the only fullback in the USL to be named to either the First or Second All USL League Team that year.

== Honors and awards ==
=== Individual ===
- USL All-League Second Team 2017
- Big West Conference Defender of the Year: 2011
- Big West Conference All-Big West First Team 2011
- NCAA D1 All-Far West First Team 2011
- ESPN College All-Stars Los Angeles Area 2011
- USL Premier Development League Defender of the Year: 2014
