= Carlos Rodríguez (footballer, born 1996) =

Mexican footballer (born 1996)

Carlos Rodriguez
Personal information
- Full name: Carlos Alberto Rodriguez Sanchez
- Date of birth: 6 June 1996 (age 30)
- Place of birth: Torreón, Mexico
- Height: 6 ft 3 in (1.91 m)
- Position: Defender

Youth career
- 2008–2015: CESIFUT Academy
- 2013: → Pachuca (loan)

Senior career*
| Years | Team | Apps | (Gls) |
| 2016–2018 | Sacramento Republic | 27 | (1) |
- * Club domestic league appearances and goals as of 17:11, 17 October 2018 (UTC)

Carlos Alberto Rodriguez Sanchez (Note: In this Spanish name, the first or paternal surname is Rodriguez and the second or maternal family name is Sanchez.) (born 6 June 1996) is a Mexican football player.

== Career ==
Rodriguez was with the CESIFUT Academy until 19 years-old, also spending time on loan with Pachuca's under-17 squad. He signed with United Soccer League side Sacramento Republic on 2 March 2016.
