= Chris Christian (soccer) =

American soccer player

Personal information
- Full name: Christopher Christian
- Date of birth: March 27, 1989 (age 37)
- Place of birth: New York, New York, United States
- Height: 1.85 m (6 ft 1 in)
- Positions: Defender; defensive midfielder

College career
Years	Team	Apps	(Gls)
2007–2010	Villanova Wildcats		

Senior career*
Years	Team	Apps	(Gls)
2009	New Jersey Rangers	2	(0)
2010–2011	Central Jersey Spartans	17	(3)
2012–2013	Motor Lublin		
2013–2014	Liberty Professionals		
2015	Atlanta Silverbacks	2	(1)
2015	→ Colorado Springs Switchbacks (loan)	5	(0)
2016–2017	Sacramento Republic	56	(1)
2018	San Antonio FC	4	(0)
2019	Oakland Roots	5	(0)
- * Club domestic league appearances and goals as of 21:10, August 31, 2019 (UTC)

Christopher Christian (born March 27, 1989) is an American soccer player who most recently played as a defender for Oakland Roots SC in the National Independent Soccer Association.

Raised in West Orange, New Jersey, Christian attended West Orange High School.

== Career ==
=== College and amateur ===
Christian played four years of college soccer at Villanova University between 2007 and 2010. While at college, Christian also appeared for USL PDL sides New Jersey Rangers and Central Jersey Spartans.

=== Professional ===
After time in Poland and Ghana, Christian signed with NASL side Atlanta Silverbacks on March 17, 2015. On August 7, 2015, Christian moved to United Soccer League side Colorado Springs Switchbacks on loan.

On January 25, 2016, Sacramento Republic FC signed Christian while a free agent after his time with Colorado Springs.

On February 15, 2018, Christian signed with San Antonio FC for the 2018 season.
