= Agustin Cazarez =

American soccer player

Personal information
- Date of birth: December 4, 1989 (age 36)
- Place of birth: Reseda, California, United States
- Height: 5 ft 7 in (1.70 m)
- Position: Midfielder

College career
| Years | Team | Apps | (Gls) |
| 2010–2011 | Saint Mary's Gaels | | |

Senior career*
| Years | Team | Apps | (Gls) |
| 2011–2014 | FC Hasental | | |
| 2014 | Ventura County Fusion | 12 | (1) |
| 2014–2017 | Sacramento Republic | 59 | (4) |
| 2018–2019 | Fresno FC | 19 | (1) |
- * Club domestic league appearances and goals as of 09:13, 16 October 2018 (UTC)

Agustin Cazarez (born December 4, 1989) is an American soccer player.

== Career ==
Cazarez played with USL PDL club Ventura County Fusion in 2014, before moving to USL Pro club Sacramento Republic on August 19, 2014.

== Honors ==
Sacramento Republic

- USL Cup: 2014
