= Chase Minter =

American soccer player

Personal information
- Date of birth: August 19, 1992 (age 34)
- Place of birth: Rowlett, Texas, United States
- Height: 1.76 m (5 ft 9 in)
- Position: Midfielder

Youth career
- 2008–2011: Dallas Texans

College career
Years	Team	Apps	(Gls)
2012–2015	Cal Poly Mustangs	77	(16)

Senior career*
Years	Team	Apps	(Gls)
2011	Des Moines Menace	1	(0)
2013–2014	Ventura County Fusion	17	(3)
2016	Sacramento Republic	6	(0)
2016	→ Tulsa Roughnecks (loan)	3	(0)
2017	Real Monarchs	19	(1)
2018	Swope Park Rangers	25	(0)
- * Club domestic league appearances and goals as of 10:18, 18 October 2018 (UTC)

Chase Minter (born August 19, 1992) is an American soccer player.

== Career ==
=== College ===
Minter played four years of college soccer at Cal Poly University between 2012 and 2015, including a red-shirted year in 2011. Minter appeared for Premier Development League side Des Moines Menace in 2011, and Ventura County Fusion in 2013 and 2014.

=== Professional ===
On January 14, 2016, Minter was selected in the second round (21st overall) of the 2016 MLS SuperDraft by Columbus Crew. However, he wasn't signed by Columbus, instead joining United Soccer League side Sacramento Republic on March 16, 2016. On August 4, 2016, Minter was sent on loan to USL side Tulsa Roughnecks. Minter signed with United Soccer League side Real Monarchs on November 17, 2016. Minter was released by Real at the end of the 2017 season.

On February 21, 2018, Minter joined USL side Swope Park Rangers. Minter was released by Swope Park on December 3, 2018.
