= Mike da Fonte =

American soccer player (born 1991)

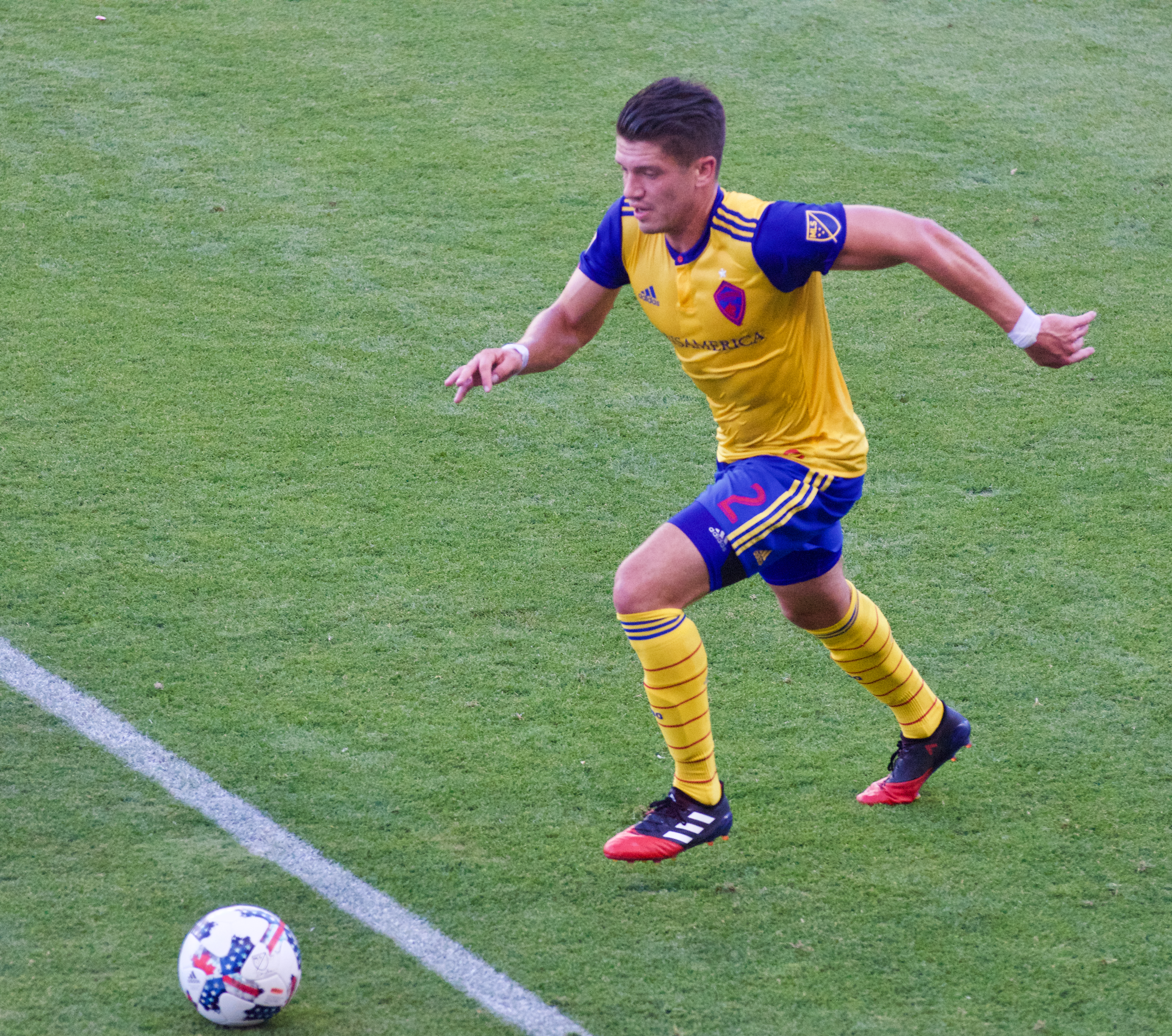
- Da Fonte in 2017

Personal information
- Full name: Michael Joseph da Fonte
- Date of birth: April 18, 1991 (age 35)
- Place of birth: Ossining, New York, United States
- Height: 1.84 m (6 ft 0 in)
- Position: Defender

College career
Years	Team	Apps	(Gls)
2009	Bryant Bulldogs	11	(1)
2010	Longwood Lancers	3	(0)
2011	Rio Grande RedStorm	18	(10)

Senior career*
Years	Team	Apps	(Gls)
2012	Westchester Flames	9	(2)
2012–2013	Espinho	23	(1)
2013–2014	Pedras Salgadas	23	(0)
2015	New York Red Bulls II	25	(0)
2016	Sacramento Republic	19	(4)
2017–2018	Colorado Rapids	17	(0)
2018	→ Phoenix Rising (loan)	31	(1)
2019–2020	Oklahoma City Energy	14	(1)
- * Club domestic league appearances and goals as of April 18, 2021

Michael Joseph da Fonte (born 18 April 1991) is an American professional soccer player who plays as a defender.

== Career ==
=== Youth and college ===
Mike da Fonte played his youth soccer with JBS FC a soccer club that was based out of Westchester County, New York. Following his youth career da Fonte played for Bryant University in 2009 before transferring to Longwood University for the 2010 season. In 2011, he transferred again, this time to the University of Rio Grande, where he concluded his college soccer career.

During his college career, he also played with the Westchester Flames of the Premier Development League during the 2012 season. He played as a left back for Westchester appearing in nine matches and scoring two goals.

=== Professional ===
In 2012, da Fonte went on trial with Portuguese First Division club S.C. Olhanense, however due to the club's financial problems they were unable to sign him. However, he was signed by S.C. Espinho of the Portuguese Second Division. In his first year in Portugal, da Fonte became a starter for the club and appeared in 23 league matches scoring 1 goal. He scored his lone goal of the season on January 20, 2013, in a 1–1 draw with UD Sousense. For the 2013–14 season da Fonte signed for Juventude de Pedras Salgadas and made 23 league appearances for the club.

Da Fonte returned to the United States and signed with New York Red Bulls II for the 2015 season. He made his debut as a starter in the club's inaugural match, a 0–0 draw with the Rochester Rhinos. da Fonte was named to the USL Team of the Week for his performance in a 1–0 victory over Wilmington Hammerheads on June 13, 2015.

Da Fonte moved across USL to Sacramento Republic FC for the 2016 season.

He signed with the Colorado Rapids early in the 2017 season. On February 10, 2018, da Fonte joined the Phoenix Rising FC on loan for the 2018 season.

Da Fonte was released by Colorado at the end of their 2018 season.

Da Fonte signed with OKC Energy FC on March 28, 2019. He was released at the end of the 2019 season, but re-signed with the club on September 2, 2020, for the remainder of the season.

== Personal life ==
Da Fonte is of Portuguese descent through his father.
