= Mackenzie Pridham =

Canadian soccer player (born 1990)

Mackenzie (Mark) Pridham
Personal information
- Full name: Mackenzie (Mark) Charles Pridham
- Date of birth: August 13, 1990 (age 36)
- Place of birth: Toronto, Ontario, Canada
- Height: 1.85 m (6 ft 1 in)
- Position: Forward

College career
Years	Team	Apps	(Gls)
2009–2013	Cal Poly Mustangs	70	(27)

Senior career*
Years	Team	Apps	(Gls)
2014	Minnesota United	1	(0)
2014	→ Pittsburgh Riverhounds (loan)	7	(1)
2015	Whitecaps FC 2	20	(0)
2016	Sacramento Republic	19	(3)
2017	Reno 1868	16	(3)
- * Club domestic league appearances and goals as of 23:39, 20 October 2017 (UTC)

Mackenzie Charles Pridham (born August 13, 1990) is a Canadian soccer player.

== Career ==
=== College & Youth ===
Mackenzie Pridham played five years of college soccer at California Polytechnic State University between 2009 and 2013, including a red-shirt year in 2010. At Cal Poly, Pridham was selected as the Big West Conference Offensive Player of the Year in 2012 and 2013.

Collegiate Statistics
Season	Apps.	Goals	Assists
2009 (Fr.)	13	0	0
2010 (RS)	-	-	-
2011 (So.)	18	2	0
2012 (Jr.)	19	11	1
2013 (Sr.)	20	14	3
Totals	70	27	4

=== Professional ===
On January 21, 2014 Pridham was selected in the fourth round (58th overall) of the 2014 MLS SuperDraft by Vancouver Whitecaps FC. However, he wasn't signed by the club.

Pridham signed with NASL club Minnesota United on April 29, 2014. He made his debut on May 12, 2014 in a 0-1 loss to New York Cosmos.

On July 21, 2013, Pridham was loaned to the Pittsburgh Riverhounds of the USL until September 30, 2014.

Pridham signed with Whitecaps FC 2 in the USL on March 17, 2015.

While on trial with Sacramento Republic FC, Pridham scored the only goal for the home side in a friendly 1-2 loss to MLS side, San Jose Earthquakes on February 20, 2016, securing his position with the club, signing a contract three days later. Pridham mirrored his efforts against Highway 99 rivals, Fresno Fuego, proving a productive preseason for the forward. In order to pursue his soccer career, Pridham put an entrepreneurial career on hold resulting in taking home much less money.
