= J. J. Koval =

American soccer player

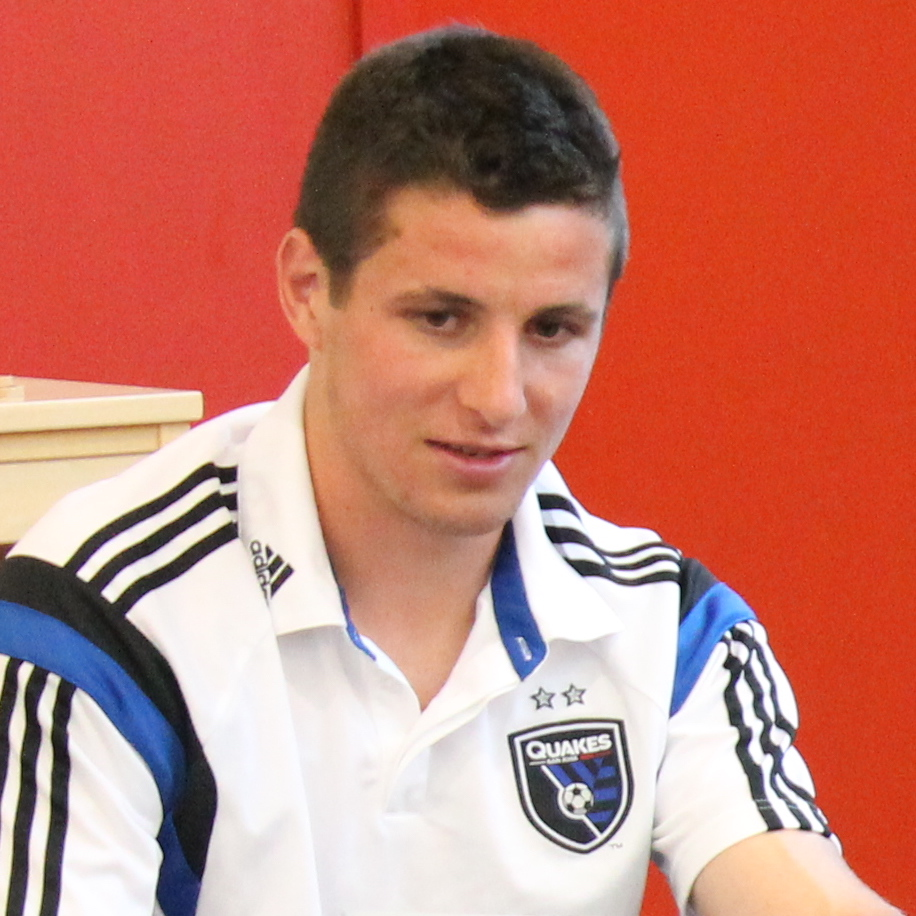
- Koval in 2014

Personal information
- Full name: Jeffrey Koval, Jr.
- Date of birth: May 19, 1992 (age 34)
- Place of birth: Westlake Village, California, U.S.
- Height: 1.86 m (6 ft 1 in)
- Position: Defensive midfielder

Youth career
- 2007–2010: Real So Cal

College career
Years	Team	Apps	(Gls)
2010–2013	Stanford Cardinal	74	(6)

Senior career*
Years	Team	Apps	(Gls)
2013	Ventura County Fusion	3	(0)
2014–2015	San Jose Earthquakes	37	(0)
2014	→ Sacramento Republic (loan)	2	(1)
2016	Sacramento Republic	27	(1)
Total		69	(2)
- * Club domestic league appearances and goals as of December 21, 2016

Jeffrey "J. J." Koval Jr. (born May 19, 1992) is an American former soccer player who last played for Sacramento Republic in the United Soccer League.

== Career ==
=== Youth and college ===
Koval played youth soccer for Real So Cal in his local area before signing a National Letter of Intent to play for Stanford Cardinal. For Stanford, Koval was a regular starter all four years for the program as a holding midfielder, appearing in all of Stanford's 74 games during that span, starting 73 of them.

=== Professional ===
Koval was drafted ninth overall in the 2014 MLS SuperDraft by the San Jose Earthquakes. He subsequently signed a contract. On March 11, 2014, Koval made his professional debut for the Earthquakes in a CONCACAF Champions League match against Toluca, coming on for Jason Hernandez in the 73rd minute.

Koval was released by San Jose on February 27, 2016.

After spending the 2016 season with the Sacramento Republic, Koval announced his retirement from professional soccer on December 21, 2016, to pursue a career in dentistry at Creighton University School of Dentistry in Omaha, Nebraska.

== Personal ==
Koval is married to Karli Koval.

Koval also credits much of his later personal development to a friend whom he met in Omaha, Nebraska during dental school: Austin Gouldsmith. The two met in 2019 and remain close friends. JJ made the most of his Creighton dental education. He helped a local Omaha resident Levi Gipson reduce molar wear by recommending less popcorn kernel gnawing, and he also served in Los Cerezos, Dominican Republic; there he completed two weeks worth of extractions, cleanings, and fillings at a makeshift dental clinic set up in the local school.
