= 2021 Austin Bold FC season =

Austin Bold FC
2021 season
- Head coach: Marcelo Serrano
- Stadium: Bold Stadium; Austin, Texas
- USL Championship: Conference: TBD
- Highest home attendance: 1,577 (7/31 v. SA)
- Lowest home attendance: 531 (8/17 v. RGV)
- Average home league attendance: 940
- Biggest win: ATX 2–0 SLC (5/26)
- Biggest defeat: ATX 0–3 SA (7/31); ELP 3–0 ATX (8/7); COL 4–1 ATX (8/28); ELP 3–0 ATX (10/20)
Home colours	Away colours

The 2021 Austin Bold FC season was the club's third and final season of existence and their third in the USL Championship, the second tier of American soccer.

== Roster ==
As of May 15, 2021

No.	Pos.	Player	Nation
1	GK	USA	Elliot Panicco (on loan from Nashville SC)
3	MF	PER	Collin Fernandez
4	DF	JAM	Jermaine Taylor
5	FW	JAM	Nathaniel Adamolekun
6	MF	SEN	Omar Ciss
7	FW	SEN	Ates Diouf
8	MF	MEX	Xavier Báez
9	FW	USA	Sean Okoli
10	MF	USA	Emilio Ycaza
11	FW	MEX	Aldo Quintanilla
12	MF	USA	Gilbert Fuentes (on loan from San Jose Earthquakes)
13	FW	USA	Roberto Avila
14	FW	JAM	Jason Johnson
15	MF	USA	Amobi Okugo
18	DF	FRA	Fabien Garcia
19	GK	IRI	Arshia Babazadeh
20	DF	USA	Josué Soto
22	DF	CHI	Jorge Troncoso
23	GK	FRA	Hugo Fauroux
24	DF	USA	Casey Walls (on loan from San Jose Earthquakes)
27	MF	USA	Juan Pablo Torres (on loan from New York City)
29	FW	BRA	Stefano Pinho
31	DF	USA	Nick Hinds (on loan from Nashville SC)
34	DF	BRA	Gustavo Rissi (on loan from Cruzeiro)
88	DF	USA	Kofi Sarkodie
91	FW	JAM	Omar Gordon

Austin Bold Academy Contract

== Competitions ==
=== Exhibitions ===
March 20 Preseason 1	Houston Dynamo	2–0	Austin Bold	Houston, TX
12:00 PM CDT		Report		Stadium: BBVA Stadium

March 24 Preseason 2	FC Dallas	3–0	Austin Bold	Frisco, TX
1:00 PM CDT	Unknown (o.g.); Jara 75'; Vargas 81'	Report		Stadium: Toyota Stadium

March 27 Preseason 3	Round Rock SC	1–6	Austin Bold

March 31 Preseason 4	Houston Dynamo	Cancelled	Austin Bold	Houston, TX
				Stadium: BBVA Stadium
Note: Match was cancelled after positive COVID-19 tests in the Austin Bold camp.

April 9 Preseason 5	Austin Bold	1–1	RGV Toros	Austin, TX
3:00 PM CDT		Report		Stadium: Bold Stadium

April 14 Preseason 6	OKC Energy	0–1	Austin Bold	Oklahoma City, OK
11:00 AM CDT		Report		Stadium: Taft Stadium

April 17 Preseason 7	FC Tulsa	1–1	Austin Bold	Tulsa, OK
2:00 PM CDT	Garcia 68'	Report	Báez 37'	Stadium: Oneok Field

April 23 Preseason 8	Austin Bold	3–0	Houston FC	Austin, TX
				Stadium: Bold Stadium

April 30 Preseason 9	Austin Bold	v	Houston FC	Austin, TX
				Stadium: Bold Stadium

April 30 Preseason 10	Austin Bold	v	Round Rock SC	Austin, TX
				Stadium: Bold Stadium

May 8 Preseason 11	Austin Bold	v	Lonestar SC	Austin, TX
				Stadium: Bold Stadium

=== USL Championship ===
==== Standings — Central Division ====
Pos	Team	Pld	W	L	T	GF	GA	GD	Pts	Qualification
3	Colorado Springs Switchbacks FC	32	13	8	11	61	48	+13	50	Advance to USL Championship Playoffs
4	Rio Grande Valley FC Toros	32	13	11	8	49	42	+7	47	Advance to USL Championship Playoffs
5	New Mexico United	32	12	10	10	44	40	+4	46	
6	Austin Bold FC	32	10	10	12	32	42	−10	42	
7	Real Monarchs	32	5	20	7	28	56	−28	22	

Source: USL

==== Results summary ====
Overall								Home						Away					
Pld	W	D	L	GF	GA	GD	Pts	W	D	L	GF	GA	GD	W	D	L	GF	GA	GD
32	10	12	10	32	42	−10	42	6	7	3	18	16	+2	4	5	7	14	26	−12

Source: USLC Standings

==== Results by round ====
Round	1	2	3	4	5	6	7	8	9	10	11	12	13	14	15	16	17	18	19	20	21	22	23	24	25	26	27	28	29	30	31	32
Stadium	A	A	H	H	H	A	A	A	A	H	A	A	H	H	A	H	H	A	H	H	H	A	H	H	A	H	A	H	A	A	A	H
Result	L	D	W	W	L	W	D	W	L	L	D	W	D	W	D	L	W	L	D	D	D	L	W	W	W	D	L	D	L	L	D	D

Source: Schedule
A = Away; H = Home; W = Win; D = Draw; L = Loss

==== Match results ====
The team's schedule was announced on March 30 featuring 32 matches, 16 at home and 16 away.

May 15 1	New Mexico United	3–1	Austin Bold	Albuquerque, NM
8:30 PM CDT	Rivas 18'; Yearwood (yellow card) 56'; Brown 61'; Moreno 66' (yellow card) 84'; Azira (yellow card) 90'; Bruce (yellow card) 90+2'	Report	Fauroux (yellow card) 28'; Hinds 46'; Rissi (yellow card) 73'	Stadium: Isotopes Park; Attendance: 8,647; Referee: Michael Radchuk

May 21 2	Real Monarchs	1–1	Austin Bold	Herriman, UT
8:00 PM CDT	Bancé (yellow card) 23'; Ramírez 41'; Flores (yellow card) 53'	Report	MacMath 60' (o.g.); Diouf (yellow card) 78'; Okoli (yellow card) 84'	Stadium: Zions Bank Stadium; Attendance: 1,409; Referee: Elvis Osmanovic

May 26 3	Austin Bold	2–0	Real Monarchs	Austin, TX
8:00 PM CDT	Okoli 40' (pen.) (yellow card) 46'; Ciss (yellow card) 87'; Troncoso 90+4'	Report	Adams (yellow card) 39'; Orozco (yellow card) 45+3'; Martinez (yellow card) 89'	Stadium: Bold Stadium; Attendance: 1,347; Referee: Melvin Rivas

May 30 4	Austin Bold	P–P	Tacoma Defiance	Austin, TX
8:00 PM CDT				Stadium: Bold Stadium; Referee: Luis Guardia
Note: Match postponed due to inclement weather.

June 3 5	Austin Bold	0–1	El Paso Locomotive	Austin, TX
8:00 PM CDT	Ycaza (yellow card) 9'; Garcia (yellow card) 29'; Hinds (yellow card) 57'; Báez (yellow card) 71'; Okoli (yellow card) 87'	Report	Yuma (yellow card) 39'; Rebellón (yellow card) 51'; Luna 56'; Zendejas (yellow card) 81'; Solignac (yellow card) 90+2'	Stadium: Bold Stadium; Attendance: 791; Referee: Mark Allatin

June 6 6	Pittsburgh Riverhounds	0–1	Austin Bold	Pittsburgh, PA
5:00 PM CDT	Wiedt (yellow card) 48'	Report	Fernandez 1'; Okugo (yellow card) 75'; Johnson (yellow card) 87'	Stadium: Highmark Stadium; Referee: Elton Garcia

June 12 7	New Mexico United	0–0	Austin Bold	Albuquerque, NM
8:30 PM CDT		Report	Gordon (yellow card) 17'; Diouf (yellow card) 52'	Stadium: Isotopes Park; Attendance: 9,288; Referee: Sergii Demianchuk

June 16 8	RGV Toros	1–2	Austin Bold	Edinburg, TX
7:00 PM CDT	Diz (yellow card) 13'; Cerritos 21'; Kuzain (yellow card) 58'; Cabezas (yellow card) 75'; Pimentel (yellow card) 82'	Report	Okoli 55' (yellow card) 90'; Garcia 90+6'	Stadium: H-E-B Park; Referee: Ismir Pekmic

June 19 9	Birmingham Legion	P–P	Austin Bold	Birmingham, AL
6:30 PM CDT				Stadium: BBVA Field; Referee: Jonathan Bilinski
Note: Match postponed due to inclement weather.

June 22 10	Austin Bold	2–3	Colorado Springs Switchbacks	Austin, TX
8:00 PM CDT	Garcia 3'; Okoli 30' (pen.); Soto (yellow card) 80'	Report	Barry 16' (pen.) 56'; Batista (red card) 27'; Mayaka (yellow card) 38'; Ngalina (yellow card) 64'; Toure 90' (yellow card) 90+3'; Hodge (yellow card) 90+6'	Stadium: Bold Stadium; Attendance: 1,248; Referee: Joshua Encarnación

June 26 11	Oakland Roots SC	0–0	Austin Bold FC	Livermore, CA
7:30 PM CDT	Klimenta (yellow card) 25'; Ward (yellow card) 29'; Mbumba (yellow card) 41'; Enríquez (yellow card) 63'	Report	Ycaza (yellow card) 8'; Okoli (yellow card) 64'	Stadium: Las Positas College Turf Field; Referee: Joseph Salinas

July 3 12	San Antonio FC	0–1	Austin Bold FC	San Antonio, TX
7:30 PM CDT	Doyle (yellow card) 15'; Lindley (yellow card) 41'; Patiño (yellow card) 71'; Deplagne (yellow card) 79'	Report	Diouf 2', (yellow card) 33'; Gordon (yellow card) 45'; Báez (yellow card) 52'; Okoli (red card) 60'; Panicco (yellow card) 77'; Soto (yellow card) 83'	Stadium: Toyota Field; Attendance: 6,243; Referee: Matthew Franz

July 7 13	Austin Bold	1–1	RGV Toros	Austin, TX
8:00 PM CDT	Hinds (yellow card) 16'; Sarkodie (yellow card) 45+1', (goal) 48'; Adamolekun (yellow card) 88'	Report	Kuzain (yellow card) 45+2'; Cabezas (yellow card) 45+3'; Pimentel (yellow card) 52'; Azócar 62'	Stadium: Bold Stadium; Attendance: 686; Referee: Elijio Arreguin

July 18 14	Austin Bold	1–0	Real Monarchs	Austin, TX
8:00 PM CDT	Torres 12', (yellow card) 62'; Ciss (yellow card) 90+3'	Report	Moberg (yellow card) 53'; Iloski (yellow card) 57'; Briggs (yellow card) 90+2'	Stadium: Bold Stadium; Attendance: 954; Referee: Greg Dopka

July 24 15	RGV Toros	1–1	Austin Bold	Edinburg, TX
8:00 PM CDT	Cabezas 8', (yellow card) 56'; López (yellow card) 67'; Deric (yellow card) 85'	Report	Torres (yellow card) 35' (yellow-red card) 50'; Báez (yellow card) 79', (goal) 85'	Stadium: H-E-B Park; Referee: Brad Jensen

July 31 16	Austin Bold	0–3	San Antonio FC	Austin, TX
8:00 p.m. CDT	Gordon (yellow card) 12'; Ycaza (yellow card) 20'; Okoli (yellow card) 23'; Garcia (yellow card) 29'; Taylor (yellow card) 37'; Hinds (yellow card) 40'; Panicco (yellow card) 67'	Report	Cuello 30' (pen.); Gallegos (yellow card) 34', (goal) 74'; Abu (yellow card) 45+4'; Deplagne (yellow card) 59'; Fogaça 69' (pen.); Maloney (yellow card) 90+5'	Stadium: Bold Stadium; Attendance: 1,577; Referee: Jervis Atagana

August 4 17	Austin Bold	2–1	Colorado Springs Switchbacks	Austin, TX
8:00 PM CDT	Torres 12'; Fernandez 81'; Diouf (yellow card) 86'	Report	Yapi 31'; Torres (yellow card) 48'; Barry (yellow card) 74'	Stadium: Bold Stadium; Attendance: 547; Referee: Gerald Flores

August 7 18	El Paso Locomotive	3–0	Austin Bold	El Paso, TX
7:30 PM	Fox 59'; Mares 72'; Carrijó 90+3'	Report	Garcia (yellow card) 86'	Stadium: Southwest University Park; Attendance: 5,348; Referee: Michael Radchuk

August 14 19	Austin Bold FC	0–0	Miami FC	Austin, TX
8:00 PM CDT	Fernandez (yellow card) 32'; Troncoso (yellow card) 45+2'; Walls (yellow card) 90+1'	Report	Sparrow (red card) 69'; Akinyode (yellow card) 74'; Chapman-Page (yellow card) 84'; Sylvestre (yellow card) 89'; François (red card) 90+2'	Stadium: Bold Stadium; Attendance: 1,226; Referee: Jeremy Scheer

August 17 20	Austin Bold	1–1	RGV Toros	Austin, TX
8:00 PM CDT	Báez 26' (pen.); Diouf (yellow card) 40'; Avila (yellow card) 44'	Report	Diz (yellow card) 8'; Manley (yellow card) 24'; Amoh 38'; Riley (yellow card) 55'	Stadium: Bold Stadium; Attendance: 531; Referee: Tori Penso

August 23 21	Austin Bold	1–1	New Mexico United	Austin, TX
8:00 PM CDT	Avila 55'	Report	Tinari (yellow card) 17'; Wehan 37'; Schmidt (yellow card) 90+2'	Stadium: Bold Stadium; Attendance: 608; Referee: Brandon Stevis

August 28 22	Colorado Springs Switchbacks	4–1	Austin Bold	Colorado Springs, CO
8:00 PM CDT	Barry 22' (pen.); Hodge 38'; Amang 40'; Zandi (yellow card) 45+2'; Ngalina 90+1'; Torres (yellow card) 90+3'	Report	Báez 15'; Soto (yellow card) 22'; Sarkodie (yellow card) 62'; Okugo (yellow card) 82'	Stadium: Weidner Field; Attendance: 8,023; Referee: Sergii Demianchuk

September 7 23	Austin Bold	2–1	San Antonio FC	Del Valle, TX
8:00 PM CDT	Garcia (yellow card) 36', (goal) 45'; Fernandez 40'; Báez (yellow card) 72'; Avila (yellow card) 83'; Soto (yellow card) 88'	Report	Sjöberg (yellow card) 32'; Dhillon 42'; PC (yellow card) 56'	Stadium: Bold Stadium; Attendance: 650; Referee: Matthew Corrigan

September 10 24	Austin Bold	1–0	New Mexico United	Austin, TX
8:00 PM CDT	Gordon (yellow card) 26'; Garcia (yellow card) 54'; Avila (yellow card) 58'; Ciss (yellow card) 71'; Báez 78' (pen.); Sarkodie (yellow card) 90+3'	Report	Guzmán (yellow card) 71'; Azira (yellow card) 77'; Yearwood (yellow card) 90+1'	Stadium: Bold Stadium; Attendance: 926; Referee: Kevin Broadley

September 18 25	FC Tulsa	0–1	Austin Bold	Tulsa, OK
7:00 PM CDT		Report	Garcia 11'; Rissi (yellow card) 14'; Diouf (yellow card) 78'; Ciss (yellow card) 90+3'	Stadium: ONEOK Field; Attendance: 3,588; Referee: Gerald Flores

September 22 26	Austin Bold	2–2	El Paso Locomotive	Austin, TX
8:00 PM CDT	Stéfano 31'; Taylor (yellow card) 34'; Okugo (yellow card) 56'; Ciss (yellow card) 90+1'; Guadarrama 90+4'	Report	Ryan (yellow card) 57'; King (yellow card) 66'; Luna 70'; Gómez 83'	Stadium: Bold Stadium; Attendance: 1,022; Referee: Natalie Simon

September 25 27	Colorado Springs Switchbacks	3–1	Austin Bold	Colorado Springs, CO
8:00 PM CDT	Beckford 8'; Mayaka (yellow card) 19'; Barry 41'; Lewis 83'; Zandi (yellow card) 90+3'; Hodge (yellow card) 90+4'	Report	Báez 17'; Soto (yellow card) 21'; Okugo (yellow card) 26'; Ciss (yellow card) 29'; Guadarrama (yellow card) 90+2'; Diouf (yellow card) 90+4'	Stadium: Weidner Field; Attendance: 6,355; Referee: Jonathan Bilinski

October 6 4	Austin Bold	1–0	Tacoma Defiance	Austin, TX
8:00 PM CDT	Gordon 62'; Okugo (yellow card) 78'	Report		Stadium: Bold Stadium; Attendance: 1,144; Referee: Luis Guardia

October 10 28	Austin Bold	1–1	OKC Energy FC	Austin, TX
8:00 PM CDT	Walls (yellow card) 45+1'; Báez 90+2' (pen.)	Report	Bijev 83'	Stadium: Bold Stadium; Attendance: 1,028; Referee: Ricardo Fierro

October 13 9	Birmingham Legion	3–1	Austin Bold	Birmingham, AL
7:00 PM CDT	Taylor 15' (o.g.); Brett 75'; Lapa 82'; Kavita (yellow card) 90+3'	Report	Adaptation 23', (yellow card) 61'; Báez (yellow card) 26'; Rissi (yellow card) 88'; Guadarrama (yellow card) 90+3'	Stadium: BBVA Field; Referee: John Griggs
Note: Re-schedule of postponed June 19th match.

October 16 29	Real Monarchs	4–3	Austin Bold	Herriman, UT
2:00 PM CDT	Torres 27', 35'; Davis 51', (yellow card) 82' (yellow-red card) 84'; Delgado (red card) 86'; Iloski 89'	Report	Sarkodie (yellow card) 13'; Walls (yellow card) 27'; Fuentes 53'; Fernandez 68', (yellow card) 74'; Okugo (yellow card) 71', (goal) 85'; Troncoso (red card) 88'	Stadium: Zions Bank Stadium; Attendance: 968; Referee: William Hoffman

October 20 30	El Paso Locomotive	3–0	Austin Bold	El Paso, TX
7:30 PM	Gómez 23', (yellow card) 34'; Solignac 48'; Luna 90'	Report	Rissi (yellow card) 36'; Diouf (yellow card) 77'; Soto (yellow card) 90+2'	Stadium: Southwest University Park; Attendance: 5,007; Referee: Kevin Broadley

October 23 31	San Antonio FC	0–0	Austin Bold FC	San Antonio, TX
7:30 PM CDT	Ford (yellow card) 30'; Maloney (yellow card) 65'; Khmiri (yellow card) 86'	Report	Guadarrama (yellow card) 30'; Panicco (yellow card) 89'	Stadium: Toyota Field; Attendance: 6,516; Referee: Ismir Pekmic

October 30 32	Austin Bold	1–1	Charlotte Independence	Austin, TX
7:00 PM CDT	Avila 63'	Report	Roberts (yellow card) 23'; Parra (yellow card) 77'; Obertan 79'; Areman (yellow card) 90+5'	Stadium: Bold Stadium; Attendance: 751; Referee: Brandon Stevis

== Statistics ==
=== Appearances and goals ===
No.	Pos.	Name	USL		Total	
No.	Pos.	Name	Apps	Goals	Apps	Goals
1	GK	(United States) Elliot Panicco	18	0	18	0
3	MF	(United States) Collin Fernandez	19	2	19	2
4	DF	(Jamaica) Jermaine Taylor	7	0	7	0
5	FW	(Jamaica) Nathaniel Adamolekun	2	0	2	0
6	MF	(Senegal) Omar Ciss	13	0	13	0
7	MF	(Senegal) Ates Diouf	18	1	18	1
8	MF	(Mexico) Xavier Báez	19	3	19	3
9	FW	(United States) Sean Okoli	13	3	13	3
10	MF	(United States) Emilio Ycaza	17	0	17	0
11	FW	(Mexico) Aldo Quintanilla	3	0	3	0
12	MF	(United States) Gilbert Fuentes	1	0	1	0
13	FW	(United States) Roberto Avila	5	1	5	1
14	FW	(Jamaica) Jason Johnson	8	0	8	0
15	MF	(United States) Amobi Okugo	14	0	14	0
18	DF	(France) Fabien Garcia	19	2	19	2
20	DF	(United States) Josué Soto	7	0	7	0
22	DF	(Chile) Jorge Troncoso	14	1	14	1
23	GK	(France) Hugo Fauroux	2	0	2	0
24	DF	(United States) Casey Walls	8	0	8	0
27	MF	(United States) Juan Pablo Torres	17	2	17	2
29	FW	(Brazil) Stefano Pinho	19	0	19	0
31	DF	(Jamaica) Nick Hinds	19	1	19	1
34	DF	(Brazil) Gustavo Rissi	15	0	15	0
88	DF	(United States) Kofi Sarkodie	13	1	13	1
91	FW	(Jamaica) Omar Gordon	18	0	18	0

Source: Stats

=== Disciplinary record ===
No.	Pos.	Name	USL		Total	
No.	Pos.	Name	Yellow card	Red card	Yellow card	Red card
6	MF	(Senegal) Omar Ciss	1	0	1	0
7	MF	(Senegal) Ates Diouf	2	0	2	0
8	MF	(Mexico) Xavier Báez	1	0	1	0
9	FW	(United States) Sean Okoli	4	0	4	0
10	MF	(United States) Emilio Ycaza	1	0	1	0
14	FW	(Jamaica) Jason Johnson	1	0	1	0
15	MF	(United States) Amobi Okugo	1	0	1	0
18	DF	(France) Fabien Garcia	1	0	1	0
23	GK	(France) Hugo Fauroux	1	0	1	0
31	DF	(Jamaica) Nick Hinds	1	0	1	0
34	DF	(Brazil) Gustavo Rissi	1	0	1	0
91	FW	(Jamaica) Omar Gordon	1	0	1	0

Source: Stats

=== Clean sheets ===
No.	Name	USL	Total	Games Played		
No.	Name	1	(United States) Elliot Panicco	3	3	6
23	(France) Hugo Fauroux	0	0	1		

Source: Stats

== See also ==
- Austin Bold FC
- 2021 in American soccer
- 2021 USL Championship season
