= 2020 Austin Bold FC season =

Austin Bold FC
2020 season
- Head coach: Marcelo Serrano
- Stadium: Bold Stadium; Austin, Texas, U.S.
- USL: Conference: 11th Group : 3rd
- USL Cup Playoffs: Did not qualify
- 2020 U.S. Open Cup: Cancelled
- Copa Tejas: Not held
- Average home league attendance: 2,496
- Biggest win: ATX 4–0 SKC (Sept. 22)
- Biggest defeat: ATX 1–3 OKC (July 17); ATX 2–4 SA (Aug. 1); RGV 2–0 ATX (Sept. 30)

The 2020 Austin Bold FC season was the second season for Austin Bold FC in the USL Championship (USLC), the second-tier professional soccer league in the United States and Canada. This article covers the period from November 18, 2019, the day after the 2019 USLC Playoff Final, to the conclusion of the 2020 USLC Playoff Final, scheduled for November 12–16, 2020.

== Club ==
As of January 15, 2020

No.	Position	Player	Nation
3	DF	NED	Edson Braafheid
4	DF	JAM	Jermaine Taylor
8	MF	MEX	Xavier Báez
9	FW	BRA	Kléber
13	FW	USA	Beto Avila
15	DF	USA	Amobi Okugo
17	DF	JAM	Sean McFarlane
19	FW	USA	Kris Tyrpak
24	GK	USA	Diego Restrepo
33	MF	USA	Sonny Guadarrama
99	FW	BRA	André Lima
—	FW	TCA	Billy Forbes

== Competitions ==
=== Exhibitions ===
February 9 Preseason 1	FC Dallas	1–0	Austin Bold FC	Frisco, TX
10:00 AM CST	Ondrášek 4'	Report; Report		Stadium: Toyota Stadium
Note: Played in three 30-minute periods.

February 15 Preseason 2	Austin Bold FC	2–2	Rio Grande Valley FC Toros	Austin, TX
6:00PM CST	Trialist #1; Trialist #2	Report; Report	McLaughlin; Trialist	Stadium: Bold Stadium

=== USL Championship ===
==== Standings — Group D ====
Pos	Team	Pld	W	D	L	GF	GA	GD	Pts	PPG	Qualification
1	San Antonio FC	16	10	3	3	30	14	+16	33	2.06	Advance to USL Championship Playoffs
2	FC Tulsa	15	6	7	2	21	16	+5	25	1.67	Advance to USL Championship Playoffs
3	Austin Bold FC	16	5	7	4	30	27	+3	22	1.38	
4	Rio Grande Valley FC Toros	14	2	3	9	17	28	−11	9	0.64	
5	OKC Energy FC	16	1	7	8	12	29	−17	10	0.63	

Source: USL

==== Match results ====
On January 9, 2020, the USL announced the 2020 season schedule.

March 7 1	Austin Bold FC	1–0	New Mexico United	Austin, Texas
7:30 PM CST	Twumasi (yellow card) 37'; Lima 52' (pen.); Troncoso (yellow card) 77'; Báez (yellow card) 85'	Report	Najem (yellow card) 77'	Stadium: Bold Stadium; Attendance: 2,496; Referee: Malik Badawi

July 17 2	Austin Bold FC	1–3	OKC Energy FC	Austin, Texas
8:00 PM CDT	Ciss (yellow card) 12'; Guadarrama 33'; Kléber (yellow card) 58'; Troncoso (yellow card) 62'; Okugo (yellow card) 68'	Report	Harris (yellow card) 11'; Hernández (yellow card) 18', (goal) 90+4'; Brown 29'; Cato (yellow card) 38'; Chávez 64' (pen.)	Stadium: Bold Stadium; Attendance: 18; Referee: Lorenzo Hernandez

August 1 5	Austin Bold FC	2–4	San Antonio FC	Austin, Texas
8:00 PM CDT	Forbes 36'; Ciss (yellow card) 42'; Yaro 52' (o.g.); Taylor (yellow card) 72'; Báez (yellow card) 87'; Okugo (yellow card) 90+1'	Report	Solignac 23', 84'; Smith 27'; Montgomery (yellow card) 68'; Parano 74'; PC (yellow card) 90+5'	Stadium: Bold Stadium; Referee: Melvin Rivas

August 8 6	Austin Bold FC	4–1	Rio Grande Valley FC Toros	Austin, Texas
8:00 PM CDT	Jome 27', 67'; Diouf 38'; Restrepo (yellow card) 59'; Twumasi (yellow card) 80'; Forbes 90+3'	Report	Coronado (yellow card) 2' (yellow-red card) 24'; Kibato 3'; Murphy (yellow card) 29'; Taiberson (yellow card) 90'	Stadium: Austin Bold Stadium; Referee: Luis Guardia

August 15 7	San Antonio FC	1–1	Austin Bold FC	San Antonio, Texas
8:00 PM CDT	PC (yellow card) 42'; Taintor (yellow card) 45+1'; Gallegos 90+2'	Report	Báez 39'; Diouf (yellow card) 76'; McFarlane (yellow card) 77'; F. Garcia (yellow card) 78'	Stadium: Toyota Field; Referee: Elton Garcia

August 19 8	FC Tulsa	2–2	Austin Bold FC	Tulsa, Oklahoma
7:00 PM CDT	Marlon (yellow card) 16'; Moloto 26'; Suárez 65'; Ayagwa (yellow card) 69'	Report	Taylor (yellow card) 44'; F. Garcia 45+2', (yellow card) 61'; Báez (yellow card) 49'; McFarlane 83', (yellow card) 89'; Jome (yellow card) 88'	Stadium: ONEOK Field; Attendance: 2,255; Referee: Jon Freemon

August 22 9	Rio Grande Valley FC Toros	2–3	Austin Bold FC	Edinburg, Texas
8:00 PM CDT	Kibato (yellow card) 22'; Obregón 58'; Jimenez 78', (yellow card) 90+5'	Report	Forbes 16'; Diouf 21', 53'; Troncoso (yellow card) 38'; F. Garcia (yellow card) 65'	Stadium: H-E-B Park; Referee: Gerald Flores

August 26 4	Colorado Springs Switchbacks FC	4–4	Austin Bold FC	Colorado Springs, Colorado
8:00 PM CDT	Volesky 48', 64'; Lewis 59'; Lebese 84'; Kurimoto (yellow card) 86'	Report	Forbes 2', 45'; Kléber 3', (yellow card) 89'; Báez 38'; Twumasi (yellow card) 75'; Okugo (yellow card) 86'	Stadium: Weidner Field; Attendance: 1,000; Referee: Ismir Pekmic

August 30 10	OKC Energy	1–1	Austin Bold FC	Oklahoma City, Oklahoma
7:00 PM CDT	Taravel (yellow card) 28'; R. García (yellow card) 31' (yellow-red card) 51'; Harris (yellow card) 38'; Chavez 41', (yellow card) 57'	Report	Forbes 14'; Kléber (yellow card) 31'; Ortíz (yellow card) 90'; Saramutin (yellow card) 90+3'	Stadium: Taft Stadium; Attendance: 1,540; Referee: Lorenzo Hernandez

September 5 11	Austin Bold FC	1–1	FC Tulsa	Austin, Texas
8:00 PM CDT	Avila 74'	Report	Suárez 30'	Stadium: Austin Bold Stadium; Referee: Elton García

September 8 3	Austin Bold FC	2–2	FC Tulsa	Austin, Texas
8:00 PM CDT	Guadarrama 45+5' (pen.); F. Garcia 52'; Forbes (yellow card) 73'	Report	Suárez 17', 37'; Bourgeois (yellow card) 45+5'; K. Garcia (yellow card) 67'	Stadium: Austin Bold Stadium; Referee: Melvin Rivas

September 12 12	Rio Grande Valley FC Toros	P–P	Austin Bold FC	Edinburg, Texas
8:00 PM CDT				Stadium: H-E-B Park
Note: Match postponed due to a positive covid-19 test in the RGVFC organization.

September 16 13	San Antonio FC	3–2	Austin Bold FC	San Antonio, Texas
8:00 PM CDT	Solignac 1', (yellow card) 61'; Parano 56'; Gallegos 72'	Report	F. Garcia (yellow card) 37'; Avila 50'; McFarlane 61'; Forbes (yellow card) 68'; Guadarrama (yellow card) 76'	Stadium: Toyota Field; Attendance: 835; Referee: Elton García

September 22 14	Austin Bold FC	4–0	Sporting Kansas City II	Austin, Texas
8:00 PM CDT	Báez (yellow card) 10', (goal) 57'; Taylor (yellow card) 13'; Watson (yellow card) 29'; Twumasi (yellow card) 37'; Rad 61' (o.g.); Diouf 73', (yellow card) 85'; Quintanilla 90+3'	Report	Serna (yellow card) 45+4'; Davis (yellow card) 67'; Mompremier (yellow card) 89'	Stadium: Austin Bold Stadium; Attendance: 1,244; Referee: Matthew Corrigan

September 27 15	OKC Energy	0–0	Austin Bold FC	Oklahoma City, Oklahoma
7:00 PM CDT	Ibeagha (yellow card) 43'; García (yellow card) 44'; Hernández (yellow card) 67'; Ellis-Hayden (yellow card) 90+8'	Report	Guadarrama (penalty missed) 44'	Stadium: Taft Stadium; Attendance: 1,775; Referee: Brandon Gardner

September 30 12	Rio Grande Valley FC Toros	2–0	Austin Bold FC	Edinburg, Texas
8:00 PM CDT	Hoffmann (yellow card) 36'; Edwards 41'; Garza (yellow card) 90+6'; Obregón 90+8' (pen.)	Report	Watson (yellow card) 40'; Taylor (yellow card) 45+4'; Diouf (yellow card) 72'	Stadium: H-E-B Park; Attendance: 716; Referee: Gerald Flores
Note: Re-schedule of postponed September 12 match.

October 4 16	Austin Bold FC	2–1	San Antonio FC	Austin, Texas
5:00 PM CDT	Forbes 42'; Báez (yellow card) 73'; Twumasi 77'; Taylor (yellow card) 90+1'	Report	Perruzza 30'	Stadium: Bold Stadium; Referee: Elton García

=== U.S. Open Cup ===
As a USL Championship club, Austin will enter the competition in the Second Round, to be played April 7–9.

April 8 2nd round	Austin Bold FC (Texas) or Atlantic City FC (New Jersey)	P–P	(Connecticut) Newtown Pride FC or (Texas) Austin Bold FC	Austin, TX or Glassboro, NJ
6:00 PM CST or 7:30 PM CST				Stadium: Bold Stadium or Rowan University Soccer Stadium
Note: Match postponed due to the COVID-19 pandemic
