= 2019 USL Championship playoffs =

Tournament details
- Country: United States; Canada
- Teams: 20

Final positions
- Champions: Real Monarchs SLC
- Runners-up: Louisville City FC

Tournament statistics
- Matches played: 19
- Goals scored: 65 (3.42 per match)
- Attendance: 102,391 (5,389 per match)
- Top goal scorer(s): Neco Brett; Magnus Rasmussen (4)

The 2019 USL Championship playoffs was the postseason tournament following the 2019 USL Championship regular season. Including USL Pro history, it was the ninth postseason tournament. The tournament began on October 23, and ended with the USL Championship Final on November 17.

The top 10 teams from each conference qualified for the playoffs. Each conference had a "Play-In round" where the 7 seed hosted the 10 seed and the 8 hosted the 9. The lowest remaining seed then played the 1 seed and the other play-in survivor played the 2 seed to form an 8-team playoff bracket. Each of the 8 team playoff brackets consisted of teams within their respective conference and the matches were hosted by the higher seed. The USL Cup will be the season's only match that involves teams from different conferences; it will be hosted by the conference champion with the better regular-season record.

Phoenix Rising FC clinched the USL Championship regular season title on September 28 and earned the number one seed in the Western Conference.

== Conference standings ==
The top 10 teams from each conference advanced to the playoffs.

Eastern Conference

Pos	Team	Pld	Pts
1	Pittsburgh Riverhounds SC	34	68
2	Nashville SC	34	67
3	Indy Eleven	34	63
4	Louisville City FC	34	60
5	Tampa Bay Rowdies	34	58
6	New York Red Bulls II	34	57
7	North Carolina FC	34	56
8	Ottawa Fury FC	34	52
9	Charleston Battery	34	46
10	Birmingham Legion FC	34	43
11	Saint Louis FC	34	42
12	Loudoun United FC	34	39
13	Charlotte Independence	34	38
14	Atlanta United 2	34	35
15	Memphis 901 FC	34	34
16	Bethlehem Steel FC	34	31
17	Hartford Athletic	34	29
18	Swope Park Rangers	34	26

Source: USL Championship Standings

Western Conference

Pos	Team	Pld	Pts
1	Phoenix Rising FC (X)	34	78
2	Reno 1868 FC	34	60
3	Fresno FC	34	57
4	Real Monarchs (C)	34	56
5	Orange County SC	34	54
6	El Paso Locomotive FC	34	50
7	Sacramento Republic	34	48
8	Austin Bold FC	34	48
9	LA Galaxy II	34	48
10	New Mexico United	34	46
11	San Antonio FC	34	45
12	Rio Grande Valley Toros	34	41
13	Las Vegas Lights FC	34	41
14	Portland Timbers 2	34	38
15	OKC Energy FC	34	38
16	Tulsa Roughnecks	34	34
17	Tacoma Defiance	34	31
18	Colorado Springs Switchbacks	34	27

Source: USL Championship Standings
(C) Champions; (X) Regular Season League Champion

== Bracket ==
Eastern Conference Play-In; October 23
7	North Carolina FC	2
10	Birmingham Legion FC	3

Eastern Conference Play-In; October 23
8	Ottawa Fury FC	1 (4)
9	Charleston Battery (p)	1 (5)

Western Conference Play-In; October 23
7	Sacramento Republic	2
10	New Mexico United	1

Western Conference Play-In; October 23
8	Austin Bold FC	2
9	LA Galaxy II	0

Conference Quarterfinals; October 26	Conference Semifinals; November 1–2
1	Pittsburgh Riverhounds SC	7
10	Birmingham Legion FC	0
1	Pittsburgh Riverhounds SC	1
4	Louisville City FC (a.e.t.)	2
4	Louisville City FC	2
5	Tampa Bay Rowdies	1
Eastern Conference
3	Indy Eleven	1
6	New York Red Bulls II	0
3	Indy Eleven	1
2	Nashville SC	0
2	Nashville SC	3
9	Charleston Battery	1
1	Phoenix Rising FC (p)	0 (8)
8	Austin Bold FC	0 (7)
1	Phoenix Rising FC	1
4	Real Monarchs SLC	2
4	Real Monarchs SLC	6
5	Orange County SC	2
Western Conference
3	Fresno FC	2
6	El Paso Locomotive FC	3
6	El Paso Locomotive FC	3
7	Sacramento Republic	0
2	Reno 1868 FC	1
7	Sacramento Republic	3

Conference Final; November 9
4	Louisville City FC (a.e.t.)	3
3	Indy Eleven	1
4	Real Monarchs SLC (a.e.t.)	2
6	El Paso Locomotive FC	1

USL Championship Final; November 17
4	Louisville City FC	1
4	Real Monarchs SLC	3

== Schedule ==
=== Conference Play-In Round ===
October 23, 2019 East	North Carolina FC	2–3	Birmingham Legion FC	Cary, North Carolina
7:00 p.m. EDT	Albadawi 19', (yellow card) 40'; Fortune 59', (yellow card) 61'	Report	Hollinger-Janzen 35'; Herivaux 66'; Williams 90+3'	Stadium: Sahlen's Stadium at WakeMed Soccer Park; Attendance: 3,675; Referee: Tim Ford

October 23, 2019 East	Ottawa Fury FC	1–1 (a.e.t.) (4–5 p)	Charleston Battery	Ottawa, Ontario
4:00 p.m. EDT	Samb 40'; Fall (yellow card) 117'	Report	Higashi 27'; Marini (yellow card) 116'; Lewis (yellow card) 117'	Stadium: TD Place Stadium; Attendance: 2,427; Referee: David Barrie
	Penalties
	Fall (penalty scored); Haworth (penalty scored); Barry (penalty scored); Samb (penalty missed); Thiago (penalty scored)		(penalty scored) Lewis; (penalty scored) Bosua; (penalty scored) Marini; (penalty scored) Svantesson; (penalty scored) van Schaik

October 23, 2019 West	Sacramento Republic FC	2–1	New Mexico United	Sacramento, California
4:00 p.m. EDT	Enevoldsen (yellow card) 44', (goal) 82'; Alemán 45+3'; Villarreal (yellow card) 67'; Werner (yellow card) 90+3'	Report	Sandoval 1'; Padilla (yellow card) 44'; Wehan (yellow card) 64'; Guzmán (yellow card) 69'; Schmidt (yellow card) 90'	Stadium: Papa Murphy's Park; Attendance: 9,907; Referee: Elton Garcia

October 23, 2019 West	Austin Bold FC	2–0	LA Galaxy II	Austin, Texas
4:00 p.m. EDT	Twumasi 9', (yellow card) 76'; Lima (yellow card) 32'; Soto (yellow card) 49'; McFarlane 54'; Braafheid (yellow card) 60'	Report	Harvey (yellow card) 35'; Hernández (yellow card) 76'; Kamara (yellow card) 77'	Stadium: Bold Stadium; Attendance: 2,656; Referee: Guido Gonzales Jr

=== Conference Quarterfinals ===
October 26, 2019 East	Pittsburgh Riverhounds SC	7–0	Birmingham Legion FC	Pittsburgh, Pennsylvania
4:00 p.m. EDT	Brett 13', 27', 34' (pen.), 71'; Fisher 17' (o.g.); Dover 45+1'; Mertz 62' (pen.); Adewole (yellow card) 77'	Report	Culbertson (yellow card) 31'; Lopez (yellow card) 41'; Herivaux (red card) 61'	Stadium: Highmark Stadium; Referee: Mark Allatin

October 26, 2019 East	Nashville SC	3–1	Charleston Battery	Nashville, Tennessee
4:00 p.m. EDT	Moloto 10'; King (yellow card) 38'; Ríos 43'; Ockford (yellow card) 77'; Davis (yellow card) 85'; Jones 88'	Report	Lewis 35' (pen.)	Stadium: First Tennessee Park; Attendance: 6,253; Referee: Greg Dopka

October 26, 2019 East	Indy Eleven	1–0	New York Red Bulls II	Indianapolis, Indiana
4:00 p.m. EDT	Ouimette 27'	Report		Stadium: Carroll Stadium; Attendance: 5,175; Referee: Michael Radchuk

October 26, 2019 East	Louisville City FC	2–1	Tampa Bay Rowdies	Louisville, Kentucky
7:00 p.m. EDT	Rasmussen 23', 24'; Ownby (yellow card) 56'	Report	Ekra (yellow card) 40'; Diakité (yellow card) 70'; Guenzatti 80'	Stadium: Louisville Slugger Field; Attendance: 4,636; Referee: Farhad Dadkho

October 26, 2019 West	Phoenix Rising FC	0–0 (a.e.t.) (8–7 p)	Austin Bold FC	Scottsdale, Arizona
7:30 p.m. MST	Lambert (yellow card) 70'; Jahn (yellow card) 86'	Report	Soto (yellow card) 14'; McFarlane (yellow card) 35'; Guadarrama (yellow card) 68' de Villardi (yellow card) 95'	Stadium: Casino Arizona Field; Attendance: 6,642; Referee: Elvis Osmanovic
	Penalties
	Flemmings (penalty scored); Bakero (penalty scored); Calistri (penalty scored); Lambert (penalty missed); Spencer (penalty scored); Farrell (penalty scored); Johnson (penalty scored); Dia (penalty scored); Cochran (penalty scored)		(penalty scored) Tyrpak; (penalty missed) de Villardi; (penalty scored) McFarlane; (penalty scored) Soto; (penalty scored) Braafheid; (penalty scored) Okugo; (penalty scored) Atuahene; (penalty scored) Twumasi; (penalty missed) Taylor

October 26, 2019 West	Reno 1868 FC	1–3	Sacramento Republic FC	Reno, Nevada
6:30 p.m. MDT	Hertzog 5'	Report	Werner 8'; Iwasa 70'; Taintor (yellow card) 73'; Enevoldsen 75'; Skundrich (yellow card) 84'	Stadium: Greater Nevada Field; Attendance: 3,275; Referee: Malik Badawi

October 26, 2019 West	Fresno FC	2–3	El Paso Locomotive FC	Fresno, California
7:30 p.m. PDT	Chaney 49'; Strong (yellow card) 51' (red card) 86'; Cooper 55'	Report	Gómez 19'; Kiffe 77'; Velásquez 83' (pen.)	Stadium: Chukchansi Park; Attendance: 5,352; Referee: Lukasz Szpala

October 26, 2019 West	Real Monarchs SLC	6–2	Orange County SC	Herriman, Utah
12:00 p.m. MDT	Chang 13'; Martínez 28'; Mulholland (yellow card) 34'; Blake 59', 90'; Schmitt 77'; Holt 81'	Report	Orozco 35', (yellow card) 80'; Forrester (yellow card) 40' (red card) 49'; Hume (yellow card) 67'; Seaton 90+1'	Stadium: Zions Bank Stadium; Attendance: 2,749; Referee: Ismir Pekmic

=== Conference Semifinals ===
November 1, 2019 West	Phoenix Rising FC	1–2	Real Monarchs SLC	Scottsdale, Arizona
7:30 p.m. MST	Flemmings 25'; Asante (yellow card) 47'	Report	Blake 33', (yellow card) 61'; Chang 43'; Powder (yellow card) 84'	Stadium: Casino Arizona Field; Attendance: 7,548; Referee: Jon Freemon

November 2, 2019 East	Pittsburgh Riverhounds SC	1–2 (a.e.t.)	Louisville City FC	Pittsburgh, Pennsylvania
7:00 p.m. EDT	Vancaeyezeele 11'; Greenspan (yellow card) 48'	Report	Spencer 51', (yellow card) 85'; McMahon (yellow card) 54'; Craig (yellow card) 70'; DelPiccolo 118'	Stadium: Highmark Stadium; Attendance: 6,073; Referee: Michael Radchuk

November 2, 2019 East	Nashville SC	0–1	Indy Eleven	Nashville, Tennessee
7:00 p.m. CDT	Washington (yellow card) 24'; LaGrassa (yellow card) 81'; Ockford (yellow card) 90+2'	Report	Ayoze (yellow card) 22'; Ouimette (yellow card) 24'; Pasher 59'	Stadium: First Tennessee Park; Attendance: 4,174; Referee: Elton García

November 2, 2019 West	El Paso Locomotive FC	3–0	Sacramento Republic FC	El Paso, Texas
7:30 p.m. MDT	Beckie (yellow card) 25'; Gómez 40'; Ryan (yellow card) 70'; Contreras 83' (pen.); Yuma (yellow card) 86'; Velásquez 88'	Report	Alemán (yellow card) 51'; Enevoldsen (yellow card) 70'; Barahona (yellow card) 87'	Stadium: Southwest University Park; Attendance: 7,460; Referee: Farhad Dadkho

=== Conference Finals ===
November 9, 2019 East	Indy Eleven	1–3 (a.e.t.)	Louisville City FC	Indianapolis, Indiana
3:00 p.m. EST	Barrett (yellow card) 45+1'; Pasher 67'; Ouimette (yellow card) 90+2'; Hackshaw (yellow card) 102'	Report	Williams (yellow card) 85'; Hoppenot 90+4'; Rasmussen 94'; Ownby (yellow card) 106'; Spencer 113' (pen.)	Stadium: Carroll Stadium; Attendance: 7,171; Referee: Guido Gonzales Jr.

November 9, 2019 West	Real Monarchs SLC	2–1 (a.e.t.)	El Paso Locomotive FC	Herriman, Utah
1:00 p.m. MST	Schmitt (yellow card) 21'; Ryden 48'; Portillo (yellow card) 88'; Mulholland (yellow card) 90+4'; Holt (yellow card) 116', (goal) 120'	Report	Fox 45+1'; Kiffe (yellow card) 47' (yellow-red card) 51'; Gómez (yellow card) 71'	Stadium: Zions Bank Stadium; Attendance: 4,521; Referee: Rosendo Mendoza

=== USL Championship Final ===
November 17, 2019
7:30 PM EST

Louisville City FC	1–3	Real Monarchs SLC
Rasmussen 6'; Williams (yellow card) 89'	Report	Holt 25', (yellow card) 69'; Plewa 45'; Schmitt (yellow card) 59'; Powder 66'

Lynn Stadium, Louisville, Kentucky
Attendance: 7,025
Referee: Tim Ford

Championship Game MVP: Konrad Plewa (SLC)

== Top goalscorers ==
Rank	Player	Club	Goals
1	(Jamaica) Neco Brett	Pittsburgh Riverhounds	4
1	(Denmark) Magnus Rasmussen	Louisville City FC	4
3	(England) Jack Blake	Real Monarchs SLC	3
3	(United States) Erik Holt	Real Monarchs SLC	3
5	(Cuba) Maikel Chang	Real Monarchs SLC	2
5	(Denmark) Thomas Enevoldsen	Sacramento Republic	2
5	(Mexico) Josué Gómez	El Paso Locomotive	2
5	(Canada) Tyler Pasher	Indy Eleven	2
5	(United States) Luke Spencer	Louisville City FC	2
5	(Colombia) Sebastián Velásquez	El Paso Locomotive	2
11	(Palestine) Nazmi Albadawi	North Carolina FC	1
11	(Canada) Keven Alemán	Sacramento Republic	1
11	(United States) Christian Chaney	Fresno FC	1
11	(Argentina) Sebastián Contreras	El Paso Locomotive FC	1
11	(Scotland) Alex Cooper	Fresno FC	1
11	(United States) Paolo DelPiccolo	Louisville City FC	1
11	(Guyana) Jordan Dover	Pittsburgh Riverhounds	1
11	(Jamaica) Junior Flemmings	Phoenix Rising FC	1
11	(Trinidad and Tobago) Dre Fortune	North Carolina FC	1
11	(England) Andrew Fox	El Paso Locomotive FC	1
11	(Uruguay) Sebastián Guenzatti	Tampa Bay Rowdies	1
11	(Haiti) Zachary Herivaux	Birmingham Legion	1
11	(United States) Corey Hertzog	Reno 1868 FC	1
11	(Japan) Kotaro Higashi	Charleston Battery	1
11	(Benin) Femi Hollinger-Janzen	Birmingham Legion	1
11	(United States) Antoine Hoppenot	Louisville City FC	1
11	(United States) Cameron Iwasa	Sacramento Republic	1
11	(United States) Derrick Jones	Nashville SC	1
11	(United States) James Kiffe	El Paso Locomotive	1
11	(Bermuda) Zeiko Lewis	Charleston Battery	1
11	(Honduras) Douglas Martínez	Real Monarchs SLC	1
11	(Jamaica) Sean McFarlane	Austin Bold FC	1
11	(United States) Robbie Mertz	Pittsburgh Riverhounds	1
11	(South Africa) Lebogang Moloto	Nashville SC	1
11	(Canada) Karl Ouimette	Indy Eleven	1
11	(United States) Michael Orozco	Orange County SC	1
11	(Poland) Konrad Plewa	Real Monarchs SLC	1
11	(Trinidad and Tobago) Noah Powder	Real Monarchs SLC	1
11	(Mexico) Daniel Ríos	Nashville SC	1
11	(United States) Kalen Ryden	Real Monarchs SLC	1
11	(Senegal) Mour Samb	Ottawa Fury FC	1
11	(United States) Devon Sandoval	New Mexico United	1
11	(United States) Tate Schmitt	Real Monarchs SLC	1
11	(Jamaica) Michael Seaton	Orange County SC	1
11	(Ghana) Ema Twumasi	Austin Bold FC	1
11	(French Guiana) Thomas Vancaeyezeele	Pittsburgh Riverhounds SC	1
11	(United States) Sam Werner	Sacramento Republic	1
11	(United States) JJ Williams	Birmingham Legion	1

Own Goals

- Kyle Fisher (Birmingham) vs Pittsburgh
