= Nathaniel Adamolekun =

Jamaican footballer (born 1998)

Personal information
- Full name: Nathaniel Ayodele Oluwademilade Adamolekun
- Date of birth: 28 August 1998 (age 28)
- Place of birth: Austin, Texas, United States
- Height: 1.93 m (6 ft 4 in)
- Positions: Forward; defender

Youth career
- –2013: Lonestar SC
- 2013–2016: Orlando City
- 2017: Feirense

College career
Years	Team	Apps	(Gls)
2016	North Carolina Tar Heels	5	(0)

Senior career*
Years	Team	Apps	(Gls)
2017–2019	Feirense	0	(0)
2018–2019	→ Pedras Rubras (loan)	6	(0)
2019–2020	Pinzgau Saalfelden	0	(0)
2019–2020	Pinzgau 1B	7	(8)
2020–2021	Austin Bold	16	(1)

International career^{‡}
- Jamaica U17
- Jamaica U20
- * Club domestic league appearances and goals as of 7 November 2021 ‡ National team caps and goals as of 7 October 2017

Nathaniel Ayodele Oluwademilade Adamolekun (born 28 August 1998) is a former professional footballer. Born in the United States, he has represented Jamaica at youth level.

== Club career ==
=== Youth ===
Adamolekun started out with his local team Lonestar SC, before moving to play with the Orlando City academy in 2013.

=== College ===
In 2016, Adamolekun began playing college soccer at the University of North Carolina at Chapel Hill, before opting to leave to pursue a professional career. He would later return to the university, graduating in 2024.

=== CD Feirense ===
In 2017, Adamolekun joined Portuguese side Feirense. He spent time with the under-23 side before spending the 2018–19 season on loan with Pedras Rubras.

=== FC Pinzgau Saalfelden ===
Adamolekun moved to Austrian Regionalliga West side Pinzgau Saalfelden in July 2019, where he scored 8 goals in 7 appearances for the club's reserve team.

=== Austin Bold ===
On 31 July 2020, Adamolekun returned to his hometown in the United States, joining USL Championship side Austin Bold. He made his debut on 19 August 2020, appearing as an 86th-minute substitute during a 2–2 draw with FC Tulsa, and made two more appearances that season. He scored one goal in 2 starts and 13 appearances during the 2021 season, after which he left the team and did not sign with another club.

== International career ==
Adamolekun has been capped at the U17 and u20 for Jamaica internationally. His sister Olufolasade Adamolekun played in the 2019 Women's World Cup for Jamaica.
