= Beto Avila (soccer) =

American soccer player (born 2000)

Personal information
- Full name: Roberto Avila
- Date of birth: October 16, 2000 (age 26)
- Place of birth: Austin, Texas, United States
- Height: 1.73 m (5 ft 8 in)
- Positions: Attacking midfielder; forward

Team information
- Current team: El Paso Locomotive
- Number: 14

Youth career
- 2014–2016: Austin Texans SC
- 2017–2018: Houston Dynamo
- 2018–2019: Lonestar SC

Senior career*
Years	Team	Apps	(Gls)
2019–2021	Austin Bold	31	(4)
2021	→ FC Edmonton (loan)	6	(0)
2022–2023	Houston Dynamo 2	19	(7)
2022–2023	Houston Dynamo	8	(0)
2023	→ Charleston Battery (loan)	26	(3)
2024	Sporting Kansas City II	26	(9)
2025–	El Paso Locomotive	48	(5)
- * Club domestic league appearances and goals as of 21:04, 8 November 2026 (UTC)

Roberto "Beto" Avila (born October 16, 2000) is an American professional soccer player who plays as a forward for USL Championship club El Paso Locomotive.

== Career ==
=== Austin Bold ===
On April 22, 2019, Avila signed an academy contract with USL Championship side Austin Bold. He made his debut for Austin on May 14, coming off the bench in a 2–0 win over the Tulsa Roughnecks in an Open Cup match. On August 17, he made his league debut, coming on as a substitute in a 5–1 win vs Tulsa. Austin qualified for the playoffs after finishing 2nd in the Western Conference, but Avila did not appear in either of Austin's 2 playoff games.

On September 5, 2020, Avila scored his first goal for Austin in a 1–1 draw against Tulsa. In a shortened 2020 season due to the COVID-19 pandemic, Avila appeared in 10 of Austin's 16 games, making 3 starts and scoring 2 goals.

On June 14, 2021, Avila joined Canadian Premier League side FC Edmonton on loan. He made his debut for Edmonton on June 26, coming on as a substitute in a 1–0 loss to Atlético Ottawa. In August, after making 6 appearances for Edmonton, Avila was recalled by Austin. He scored his first goal of the season on August 23, helping Austin to a 1–1 draw against New Mexico United. Avila ended the season with 18 appearances and 2 goals for Austin.

=== Houston Dynamo ===
On February 17, 2022, Avila signed with MLS Next Pro side Houston Dynamo 2, the reserve team of MLS club Houston Dynamo. After a strong start to the season for Dynamo 2, Avila made his debut for the first team on April 19, setting up Sam Junqua in the 90+3rd minute to give Houston a 2–1 over RIo Grande Valley FC in an Open Cup match. On May 6, Avila signed a first team contract with the Dynamo. He made his MLS debut on May 14, coming off the bench in a 2–0 win against Nashville SC. Avila ended the year with 11 first team appearances, 8 as a sub in MLS plus 3 appearances in the Open Cup, while also scoring 6 goals and recording 4 assists in 14 games with Dynamo 2.

=== Charleston Battery ===
On May 26, 2023, Avila was moved on loan to USL Championship side Charleston Battery for the remainder of their 2023 season. Avila scored his first goal for the club on June 24 against Memphis 901 FC. He ended the regular season with three goals and two assists across 23 appearances en route to helping Charleston finish 3rd in the Eastern Conference standings and make their first playoff appearance since 2020.

== Personal life ==
Born in the United States, Avila is of Mexican descent and holds dual citizenship.

== Career statistics ==
As of October 18, 2025

Club	Season	League			Cup (Note: Includes Canadian Championship and U.S. Open Cup)		Playoffs		Continental		Other		Total	
Club	Season	Division	Apps	Goals	Apps	Goals	Apps	Goals	Apps	Goals	Apps	Goals	Apps	Goals
Austin Bold	2019	USL	3	0	1	0	0	0	—		—		4	0
Austin Bold	2020	USL	10	2	—		—		—		—		10	2
Austin Bold	2021	USL	18	2	—		—		—		—		18	2
Austin Bold	Total		31	4	1	0	0	0	0	0	—		32	4
FC Edmonton (loan)	2021	CPL	6	0	—		—		—		—		6	0
Houston Dynamo 2	2022	MLS Next Pro	13	5	—		1	1	—		—		14	6
Houston Dynamo 2	2023	MLS Next Pro	6	2	—		0	0	—		—		6	2
Houston Dynamo 2	Total		25	7	0	0	1	1	0	0	—		26	8
Houston Dynamo	2022	MLS	8	0	3	0	—		—		—		11	0
Houston Dynamo	2023	MLS	0	0	0	0	0	0	0	0	—		0	0
Houston Dynamo	Total		8	0	3	0	0	0	0	0	—		11	0
Charleston Battery (loan)	2023	USL Championship	26	3	3	0	0	0	0	0	—		29	3
Sporting Kansas City II	2024	MLS Next Pro	26	9	0	0	0	0	0	0	—		26	9
El Paso Locomotive	2025	USL Championship	26	3	2	0	0	0	0	0	3 (Note: Includes appearance in USL Cup)	1	31	4
Career total			142	26	9	0	1	1	0	0	3	1	155	28
