= Jorge Troncoso =

Chilean footballer (born 1993)

Personal information
- Full name: Jorge Nicolás Troncoso Ramírez
- Date of birth: 14 January 1993 (age 33)
- Place of birth: Santiago, Chile
- Height: 1.70 m (5 ft 7 in)
- Positions: Right-back; midfielder

Youth career
- Colo-Colo

Senior career*
Years	Team	Apps	(Gls)
2011–2014	Colo-Colo	2	(0)
2012	→ Curicó Unido (loan)	8	(1)
2012	Colo-Colo B	7	(0)
2013	→ San Antonio Unido (loan)	16	(0)
2013–2014	Colo-Colo B	6	(0)
2014–2017	Universidad de Concepción	45	(5)
2017	Deportes La Serena	7	(0)
2018	Deportes Melipilla	6	(0)
2019–	Austin Bold	40	(2)
- * Club domestic league appearances and goals as of 6 August 2022

Jorge Nicolás Troncoso Ramírez (born 14 January 1993) is a Chilean professional footballer who plays as a midfielder for Austin Bold FC.

== Career ==
A product of Colo-Colo youth system, he made his professional debut in 2011 when Américo Gallego was the head coach, in the match versus Cobreloa in 20 March. After having not much chances to play for the first team, he played for the B-team in the third level of the Chilean football and on loan at Curicó Unido and San Antonio Unido. In 2014 he moved to Universidad de Concepción and next he played for Deportes La Serena and Deportes Melipilla.

In 2019 he moved outside Chile and joined American club Austin Bold FC thanks to a Spanish agent. In the club he has coincided with Darío Conca, a well-known player in his country of birth, and with Edson Braafheid, a Dutch international.
