= Hugo Fauroux =

French footballer (born 1996)

Personal information
- Full name: Hugo Alain Fauroux
- Date of birth: August 23, 1996 (age 30)
- Place of birth: Cannes, France
- Height: 1.86 m (6 ft 1 in)
- Position: Goalkeeper

Team information
- Current team: Louisville City
- Number: 1

Youth career
- 2000–2013: Cannes
- 2013–2015: Monaco

College career
Years	Team	Apps	(Gls)
2015–2016	Lake Erie Storm	24	(0)
2017–2018	FIU Panthers	29	(0)

Senior career*
Years	Team	Apps	(Gls)
2018	Miami City	4	(0)
2019	Valdres FK	8	(0)
2020	Palm Beach Stars		
2021	Austin Bold	5	(0)
2022	Charleston Battery	22	(0)
2023–2025	Loudoun United	79	(0)
2026–	Louisville City	10	(0)
- * Club domestic league appearances and goals as of 12:31, 8 November 2026 (UTC)~

Hugo Alain Fauroux (born 23 August 1996) is a French professional footballer who currently plays for USL Championship side Louisville City FC.

== Career ==
=== Youth ===
Fauroux spent time in the academies of Cannes and Monaco.

=== College and amateur ===
In 2015, Fauroux moved to the United States to play college soccer at Lake Erie College. He went on to make 24 appearances for the Storm and was named GLIAC Goalkeeper of the Year in 2016. In 2017, Fauroux transferred to Florida International University, making 29 appearances them over two seasons, been named All-Conference USA Third-Team in his junior season.

In 2018, Fauroux also appeared for USL Premier Development League side FC Miami City.

=== Valdres FK ===
Ahead of their 2019 season, Norwegian 3. divisjon side Valdres FK announced the signing of Fauroux. He made 8 appearances the club during a season where they finished bottom of the league with only 3 points and a goal difference of -183 over 26 games.

=== Palm Beach Stars ===
In 2020, Fauroux returned to the United States, joining UPSL side Palm Beach Stars.

=== Austin Bold ===
On 10 March 2021, Fauroux signed with USL Championship side Austin Bold. He made his debut for Austin on 15 May 2021, starting in a 3–1 loss to New Mexico United.

=== Charleston Battery ===
On 1 March 2022, Fauroux signed with USL Championship club Charleston Battery ahead of their 2022 season. He made his club debut during the Lamar Hunt U.S. Open Cup on 7 April 2022, starting against South Georgia Tormenta FC in the Second Round. Fauroux became a regular starter for the Battery midway through the 2022 season and would register the seventh-most saves in the league's regular season with 83. Following the 2022 season, Fauroux was released by Charleston.

=== Loudoun United ===
On 3 February 2023, Faroux signed with USL Championship side Loudoun United for their 2023 season.
