= Ryan Thompson (footballer) =

Jamaican footballer (born 1985)

Personal information
- Full name: Ryan Andre Oniel Thompson
- Date of birth: 7 January 1985 (age 41)
- Place of birth: Kingston, Jamaica
- Height: 6 ft 1 in (1.85 m)
- Position: Goalkeeper

Youth career
- 1997–2003: Harbour View

College career
Years	Team	Apps	(Gls)
2006–2009	Tampa Spartans	57	(1)

Senior career*
Years	Team	Apps	(Gls)
2003–2006	Harbour View		
2008–2009	Bradenton Academics	12	(0)
2010	MPS Portland Phoenix	12	(0)
2011	Shamrock Rovers	21	(0)
2012	AFC Eskilstuna	6	(0)
2012-2013	Väsby United	6	(0)
2013-2014	Tampa Bay Rowdies	0	(0)
2015	Pittsburgh Riverhounds	10	(0)
2016	Saint Louis FC	9	(0)
2017	Central FC	0	(0)
2019–2020	Austin Bold	0	(0)

International career^{‡}
2002–2005	Jamaica U20	20	(0)
2007	Jamaica U23	2	(0)
2004–2017	Jamaica	11	(0)

Managerial career
- 2010: Tampa Spartans (assistant)
- 2017–2018: West Florida Flames (director of goalkeeping)
- 2017–2018: USF Bulls (assistant)
- 2019: Austin Bold (player-goalkeeping coach)
- 2020–2021: Austin Bold (assistant)
- 2021–: Austin Bold
Medal record
Men's football
Representing Jamaica
CONCACAF Gold Cup
Runner-up	2015 United States–Canada	Team
- * Club domestic league appearances and goals as of 5 September 2021 ‡ National team caps and goals as of 03:19, 10 September 2021 (UTC)

Ryan Andre Oniel Thompson (born 7 January 1985) is a Jamaican former footballer, who is currently the goalkeeper coach of MLS Next Pro club Houston Dynamo 2.

== Career ==
=== Career ===
==== Harbour View ====
Ryan was the starting keeper at Harbour View until he accepted a soccer scholarship to the University of Tampa in Tampa, Florida.

==== College and amateur ====
Thompson was an All-American during his time at the University of Tampa. He played 57 times for the Tampa Spartans whilst at the university.

During his time in college, Thompson also played for Bradenton Academics in the USL Premier Development League.

==== MPS Portland Phoenix ====
After graduating from the University of Tampa, Thompson signed with MPS Portland Phoenix in Maine for the 2010 PDL season. Thompson's Portland team finished runners-up in the Eastern Conference Northeast Division. Portland were beaten 2–1 against Reading United in the Conference Semi-Finals and were eliminated. Thompson played 13 games for the Phoenix in his one season with the Maine club.

==== Shamrock Rovers ====
After a two-week trial in September 2010, Thompson signed with Shamrock Rovers in December 2010. The deal was finalized in February 2011 after he received his international clearance. Thompson spent much of the first half of the season on the bench as he was Rovers second choice keeper behind Alan Mannus. In March 2011, Thompson played in both legs of the Quarter-Finals of the 2011 Setanta Sports Cup for Rovers against Lisburn Distillery, Rovers went on to win the competition. Thompson played his first league game for Shamrock Rovers in a 1–0 win away against Dorgheda United on 15 July 2011. On 21 July, Alan Mannus signed for Scottish Premier League club St Johnstone which meant Thompson became Rovers new first choice goalkeeper.

On 27 July 2011, he became the first Jamaican to play in the Champions League, when Shamrock Rovers played FC Copenhagen in the 2011–12 UEFA Champions League Third qualifying round, Rovers were beaten 1–0 in the first-leg in Copenhagen and lost 2–0 in the second-leg in Tallaght on 2 August. Thompson and Rovers advanced to the 2011–12 Europa League play-off round where they faced Serbian SuperLiga Champions FK Partizan. The first leg in Dublin finished 1–1. The second leg in Serbia finished 1–1 and the tie went to extra time. Rovers scored a penalty in the 113-minute of the game and advanced to the 2011–12 Europa League group stage. In that game in Belgrade Thompson pulled off an incredible save in the first half. This marked a famous victory for Irish football, as it was the first time an Irish club reached the group stages of a major European competition.

In the first game in the group stages Thompson saved a penalty against Rubin Kazan. He went on to play in 3 other group games but despite his European heroics he was released at the end of the 2011 League of Ireland season.

==== Väsby United ====
In August 2012 Thompson signed for Väsby United, a third-tier club in Sweden

==== Tampa Bay Rowdies ====
In January 2014 Thompson signed for Tampa Bay Rowdies of the North American Soccer League on a two-year contract

==== Pittsburgh Riverhounds ====
Thompson signed for the Pittsburgh Riverhounds of the USL on 22 January 2015. Following his performance at the 2015 CONCACAF Gold Cup, Thompson and the Riverhounds mutually parted ways after the 2015 season so that he could seek a move to Europe or to Major League Soccer.

==== Saint Louis FC ====
Thompson signed with USL club Saint Louis FC on 3 March 2016. Thompson was released by Saint Louis FC on 9 November 2016.

==== Central FC ====
From May to September 2017, Thompson was signed with Central F.C. of the TT Pro League.

==== Austin Bold FC ====
On 26 November 2018, Thompson signed with USL Championship expansion team Austin Bold FC as both a goalkeeper and goalkeeper coach.

== International career ==
Thompson was a part of the Jamaica under-20 squad in 2002–2005. He traveled internationally to Europe, Central America and the Caribbean for youth national teams. He made his full international debut on 26 November 2004 in a 2005 Caribbean Cup qualifier in an 11–1 victory over the US Virgin Islands.

Thompson was called up in 2014 as part of the squad for the 2014 Caribbean Cup and multiple friendlies but was an unused substitute in every match. Thompson was recalled by Jamaica in March 2015 for friendlies against Cuba and Venezuela. Thompson opted to remain with his club team, the Pittsburgh Riverhounds, in order to play in their first match of the 2015 USL season. Thompson left the following day to join his teammates in preparation for the match against Cuba. Thompson went on to earn his third cap in that match and posted the shutout in the 3−0 victory.

On 2 June 2015, it was announced that Thompson was included in Jamaica's roster for the 2015 Copa América. He was then named to the final 23-man roster for the 2015 CONCACAF Gold Cup. On 14 July 2015, Thompson made his Gold Cup debut against El Salvador after Dwayne Miller came off with a head injury. Thompson made several saves to preserve Jamaica's 1–0 victory as the team advanced to the knockout stages as Group B leaders.

== Coaching career ==
On September 4, 2021, Thompson was promoted to head coach for USL Championship club Austin Bold FC. Thompson had previously been a player-coach for the team before being promoted to full-time assistant coach.

== Honours ==
Harbour View

- CFU Club Championship: 2004

Shamrock Rovers

- Setanta Cup: 2011
- League of Ireland: 2011
