= Ema Twumasi =

Ghanaian footballer

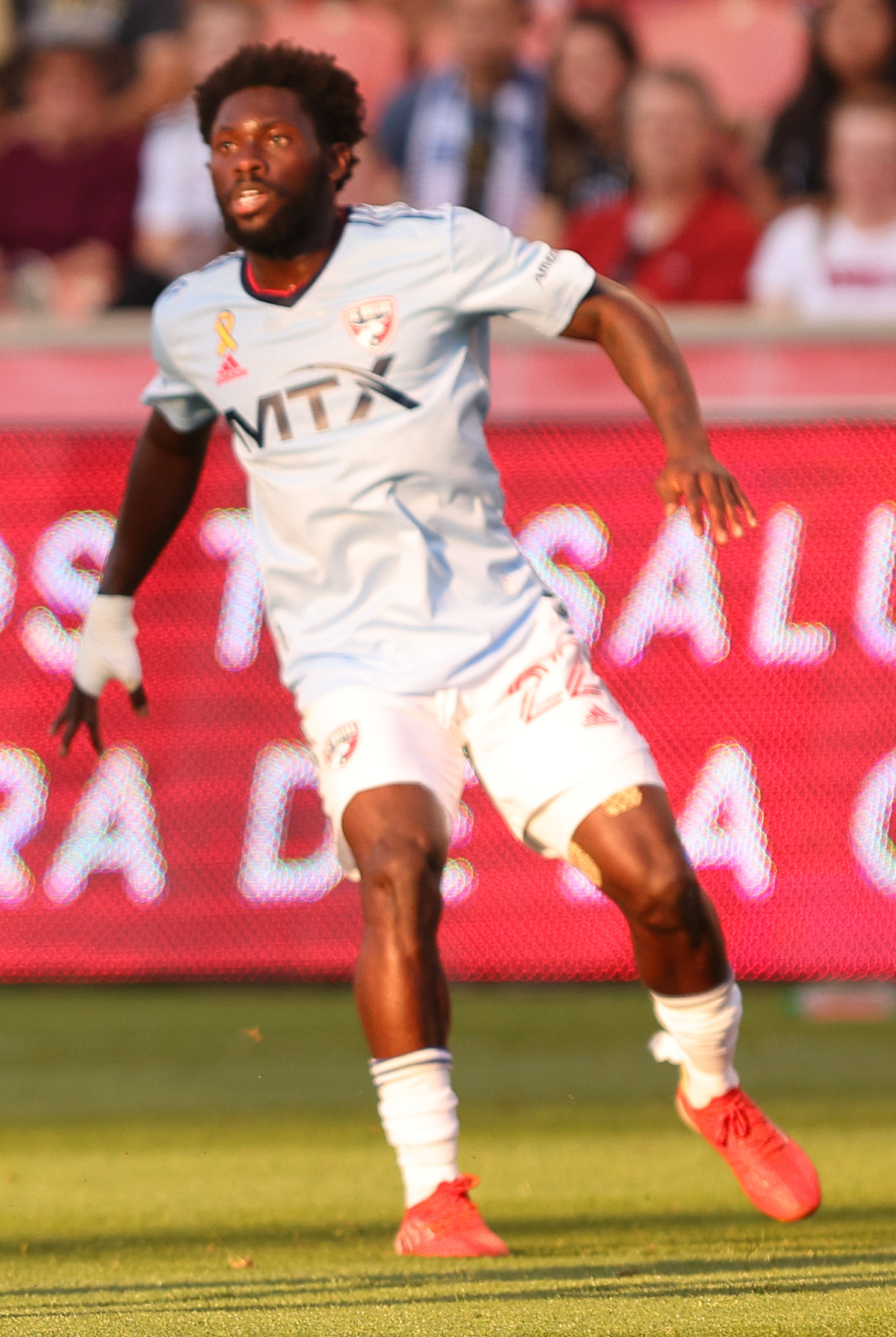
- Twumasi with FC Dallas in 2021

Personal information
- Full name: Emmanuel Twumasi
- Date of birth: 18 May 1997 (age 29)
- Place of birth: Accra, Ghana
- Height: 1.72 m (5 ft 8 in)
- Positions: Wing-back; winger

Team information
- Current team: Piast Gliwice
- Number: 99

Youth career
- 2008–2012: Right to Dream Academy

College career
Years	Team	Apps	(Gls)
2016–2017	Wake Forest Demon Deacons	47	(16)

Senior career*
Years	Team	Apps	(Gls)
2017	Michigan Bucks	0	(0)
2017	GPS Portland Phoenix	0	(0)
2018–2024	FC Dallas	103	(1)
2018	→ Oklahoma City Energy (loan)	6	(0)
2019–2020	→ Austin Bold (loan)	32	(4)
2025–	Piast Gliwice	27	(1)
- * Club domestic league appearances and goals as of 21:59, 29 May 2026 (UTC)

Emmanuel "Ema" Twumasi (born 18 May 1997) is a Ghanaian professional footballer who plays for Ekstraklasa club Piast Gliwice.

== Career ==
=== Youth and college ===
Twumasi played high school soccer at the Kent School in Kent, Connecticut, where he was named the Connecticut Boys' Soccer Gatorade Player of the Year in 2015.

Twumasi played two years of college soccer at Wake Forest University between 2016 and 2017. He left college early to sign a Generation Adidas contract with Major League Soccer ahead of the MLS SuperDraft.

While at college, Twumasi played with USL PDL sides Michigan Bucks and GPS Portland Phoenix in 2017, appearing for the latter in the US Open Cup.

=== Professional ===
On 19 January 2018, Twumasi was selected 11th overall in the 2018 MLS SuperDraft by FC Dallas. On 2 March 2018, he was loaned to United Soccer League side Oklahoma City Energy. He made his debut on 17 March 2018, appearing as a 60th-minute substitute in a 1–0 win over Tulsa Roughnecks.

On 12 June 2019, Twumasi joined USL Championship side Austin Bold FC on loan until the end of the season. On 6 March 2020, it was announced that the loan would be extended for the 2020 season.

He was released by Dallas following their 2024 season.

After spending the first half of 2025 without a club, he joined Polish top flight club Piast Gliwice on 25 June 2025.

== Career statistics ==
As of match played 23 May 2026

Appearances and goals by club, season and competition
Club	Season	League			National cup (Note: Includes U.S. Open Cup)		Other		Total	
Club	Season	Division	Apps	Goals	Apps	Goals	Apps	Goals	Apps	Goals
FC Dallas	2018	MLS	1	0	1	0	—		2	0
FC Dallas	2019	MLS	2	0	0	0	0	0	2	0
FC Dallas	2020	MLS	4	0	—		1 (Note: Appearance(s) in MLS Cup playoffs)	0	5	0
FC Dallas	2021	MLS	23	0	0	0	0	0	23	0
FC Dallas	2022	MLS	31	0	1	0	2	0	34	0
FC Dallas	2023	MLS	23	1	1	0	4 (Note: Three appearances in MLS Cup Playoffs, one appearance in Leagues Cup)	0	28	1
FC Dallas	2024	MLS	19	0	0	0	1 (Note: Appearance(s) in Leagues Cup)	0	20	0
FC Dallas	Total		103	1	3	0	8	0	114	1
Oklahoma City Energy (loan)	2018	USL	6	0	0	0	—		6	0
Austin Bold (loan)	2019	USL	18	3	0	0	2 (Note: Appearance(s) in USL Championship playoffs)	0	20	4
Austin Bold (loan)	2020	USL	14	1	—		—		14	1
Austin Bold (loan)	Total		32	4	0	0	2	1	34	5
Piast Gliwice	2025–26	Ekstraklasa	27	1	0	0	—		27	1
Career total			168	6	3	0	10	1	181	7
