= Gustavo Rissi =

Brazilian footballer (born 1998)

Personal information
- Full name: Gustavo Martini Rissi
- Date of birth: 4 February 1998 (age 28)
- Place of birth: Araras, Brazil
- Height: 1.84 m (6 ft 0 in)
- Position: Defender

Team information
- Current team: Azul Claro Numazu
- Number: 4

Youth career
- 2011–2014: Fluminense
- 2014–2018: Cruzeiro

Senior career*
Years	Team	Apps	(Gls)
2018–2021	Cruzeiro	0	(0)
2018	Cruzeiro B		
2019	→ Ipatinga (loan)	4	(0)
2019	→ Boa Esporte (loan)		
2019–2021	→ Austin Bold (loan)	35	(1)
2022	Rochester NY	10	(0)
2023	Indy Eleven	11	(0)
2023	→ Miami FC (loan)	1	(0)
2024–	Azul Claro Numazu	17	(0)
- * Club domestic league appearances and goals as of 1 January 2026

Gustavo Martini Rissi (born 4 February 1998) is a Brazilian footballer who most recently played as a defender for J3 League club Azul Claro Numazu.

== Career ==
On February 16, 2022, Rissi signed with MLS Next Pro independent club Rochester New York FC ahead of the 2022 season.

== Career statistics ==
As of June 23, 2024

Appearances and goals by club, season and competition
Club	Season	League			Cup		Other		Total	
Club	Season	Division	Apps	Goals	Apps	Goals	Apps	Goals	Apps	Goals
Cruzeiro	2018	Série A	0	0	—	—	—	—	0	0
Austin Bold (loan)	2019	USL Championship	5	1	—	—	2	0	7	1
Austin Bold (loan)	2020	USL Championship	4	0	—	—	—	—	4	0
Austin Bold (loan)	2021	USL Championship	26	0	—	—	—	—	26	0
Austin Bold (loan)	Total		35	1	—	—	2	0	37	1
Rochester New York	2022	MLS Next Pro	10	0	3 (Note: Appearances in U.S. Open Cup)	0	—	—	13	0
Indy Eleven	2023	USL Championship	11	0	2	0	—	—	13	0
Miami FC (loan)	2023	USL Championship	1	0	—	—	—	—	1	0
Azul Claro Numazu	2024	J3 League	—	—	0	0	—	—	0	0
Career Total			57	1	5	0	2	0	64	1
