= Casey Walls =

American soccer player

Personal information
- Full name: Casey Walls
- Date of birth: January 10, 2003 (age 23)
- Place of birth: Surrey, England
- Height: 6 ft 2 in (1.88 m)
- Position: Defender

Youth career
- Chelsea
- –2017: Marin FC
- 2017–2020: San Jose Earthquakes

Senior career*
Years	Team	Apps	(Gls)
2020–2024	San Jose Earthquakes	0	(0)
2021	→ Austin Bold (loan)	15	(0)
2022–2024	The Town FC	54	(2)
2025	Phoenix Rising	2	(0)

International career^{‡}
2019	United States U16	6	(0)
2021	United States U20	2	(0)
- * Club domestic league appearances and goals as of February 6, 2025 ‡ National team caps and goals as of February 6, 2025

Casey Walls (born January 10, 2003) is a former professional soccer player who played as a defender. Born in England, he represented the United States at youth level.

== Club career ==
=== Youth ===
Born in Surrey, England, Walls started his career in the Chelsea academy, before moving to the United States. He joined the San Jose Earthquakes in 2017 from local side Marin FC. He grew up in Mill Valley, California.

Walls joined the San Jose Earthquakes Academy in 2017, joining from Marin FC. He went on to compete for the Quakes at the U-15, U-17 and U-19 levels.

=== San Jose Earthquakes ===
San Jose signed Walls to a homegrown player contract on November 5, 2019, ahead of the 2020 MLS season.

On May 3, 2021, Walls joined USL Championship side Austin Bold on a season-long loan. He made his professional debut on July 24, 2021, appearing as a 74th-minute substitute during a 1–1 draw with Rio Grande Valley FC.

== International career ==
Walls has played within the United States Youth National Team system, spending time with the U-14, U-15 and U-16 sides.
