= Edson Braafheid =

Dutch footballer (born 1983)

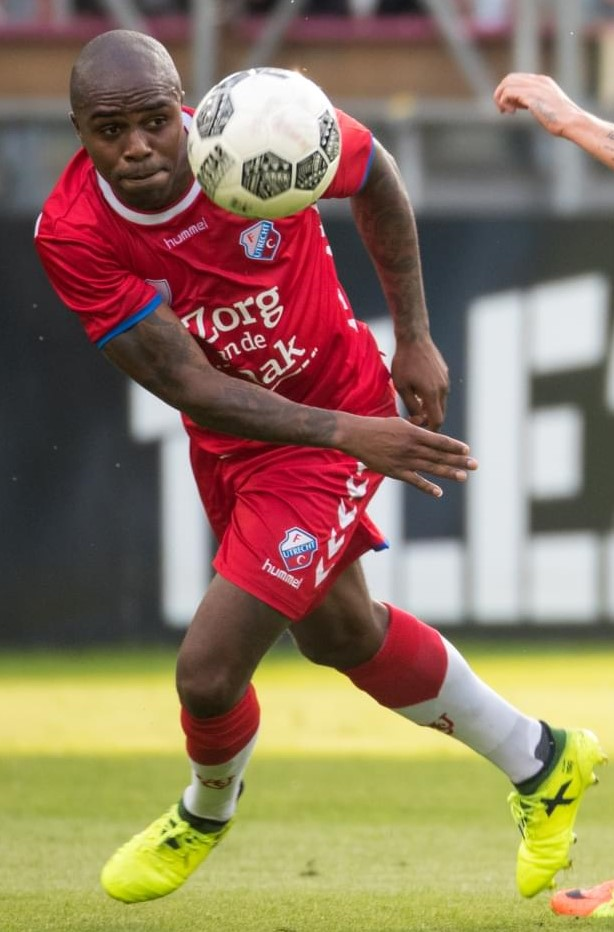
- Braafheid playing for FC Utrecht in 2017

Personal information
- Full name: Edson René Braafheid
- Date of birth: 8 April 1983 (age 43)
- Place of birth: Paramaribo, Suriname
- Height: 1.76 m (5 ft 9 in)
- Position: Left-back

Youth career
- JOS Amsterdam
- Amstelland
- Abcoude
- –2003: Utrecht

Senior career*
Years	Team	Apps	(Gls)
2003–2007	FC Utrecht	81	(2)
2007–2009	FC Twente	76	(1)
2009–2011	Bayern Munich	12	(0)
2010	→ Celtic (loan)	10	(0)
2011–2014	1899 Hoffenheim	31	(1)
2012–2013	→ FC Twente (loan)	28	(1)
2014–2016	Lazio	17	(0)
2016–2018	FC Utrecht	13	(0)
2017–2018	Jong FC Utrecht	3	(1)
2019–2020	Austin Bold	14	(0)
2020–2021	Palm Beach Stars		

International career^{‡}
2004–2006	Netherlands U21	16	(0)
2009–2011	Netherlands	10	(0)
Medal record
Representing Netherlands
Men's football
FIFA World Cup
Runner-up	2010 South Africa	Team
UEFA European Under-21 Championship
Winner	2006 Portugal
- * Club domestic league appearances and goals as of 6 October 2020 ‡ National team caps and goals as of 30 November 2011

Edson René Braafheid (born 8 April 1983) is a former professional footballer who played as a left back and currently works as a player representative at the Tevreden Group. Born in the Suriname, he represents the Netherlands national team, notably appearing at the 2010 FIFA World Cup.

Braafheid started his career as a defender with Eredivisie side Utrecht in 2003, before moving on to FC Twente in 2007 on a free transfer. He was signed by German Bundesliga club Bayern Munich in 2009 for €2 million. After failing to break into the team during the first half of the season Braafheid moved on loan to Scottish Premier League club Celtic, in order to increase his chances of playing in the 2010 FIFA World Cup with Holland. After a few appearances at the start of the 2011–12 season for Bayern, Braafheid moved to fellow Bundesliga club Hoffenheim.

Braafheid has played for the U-21 and full Netherlands team. Braafheid was called up to the Netherlands squad for the 2008 Summer Olympics, however, due to Twente's European matches early in the season he couldn't go. He was also called up to the squad for the 2010 World Cup and made a substitute appearance in the final.

== Club career ==
=== Utrecht ===
Braafheid began his professional career at FC Utrecht in 2003 and made 81 appearances for the side.

=== FC Twente ===
On 10 February 2007, Braafheid played his first Eredivisie match for FC Twente against Feyenoord. His current contract at the club lasts until 2010.

Braafheid came to Twente on a free transfer after his contract with Utrecht expired. He was a left-back, but played for Twente as a central defender instead of his former position under Coach Fred Rutten.

=== Bayern Munich ===
Braafheid joined Bayern Munich for the 2009–10 season after the German club and Twente agreed on a €2 million transfer deal on 11 June 2009. He was not able to secure himself a place in the starting squad, however, during the first half of the season, he asked for a transfer in order to have a chance of being nominated for the Dutch 2010 World Cup team.

=== Celtic ===
Braafheid was signed by Celtic of Scotland on a loan deal until the end of the 2009–10 season on 1 February.

Braafheid made his debut for Celtic on 7 February 2010 in a 4–2 victory over Dunfermline Athletic in the Scottish Cup. He failed to make an impression afterwards, and played in several draws and defeats in crucial games for Celtic. He was finally dropped from the first team following the sacking of Tony Mowbray on 25 March 2010.

=== 1899 Hoffenheim ===
After Braafheid made only three appearances in the first leg of the new season, he moved to fellow Bundesliga side 1899 Hoffenheim on 27 January, following teammate David Alaba. On 5 February 2011, Braafheid made his debut for the team in the 3–2 home win against 1. FC Kaiserslautern, but was sent off only six minutes after coming on as a substitute for Vedad Ibišević.

Returning from a one-season loan spell at FC Twente and despite his contract running until June 2014, Braafheid was no longer part of Hoffenheim's Bundesliga squad for the 2013-14 campaign. His former shirt number 28 was assigned to Alexander Stolz. After the summer transfer window had closed, he started to participate in the U23 training sessions.

=== S.S. Lazio ===
On 1 August 2014, S.S. Lazio announced that they had signed Braafheid on a free transfer. He renewed contract on 6 July 2015.

=== FC Utrecht ===
On 17 August 2016, Braafheid signed a one-year contract at his first club FC Utrecht. In early January 2018, he agreed the termination of his contract with Utrecht citing family reasons and lack of playing time.

=== Austin Bold FC ===
In August 2018, Braafheid was one of the first three players signed by USL Championship expansion club Austin Bold FC, along with Kléber Freitas and Marcelo Saragosa. Braafheid's work visa cleared in June 2019 and he made his debut for Bold FC on June 30, playing the full 90 in a 5-0 win over Colorado Springs Switchbacks FC.

=== Palm Beach Stars ===
Braafheid continued his career by joining the Palm Beach Stars of the Florida-based Premier American Soccer League in November 2020.

== International career ==
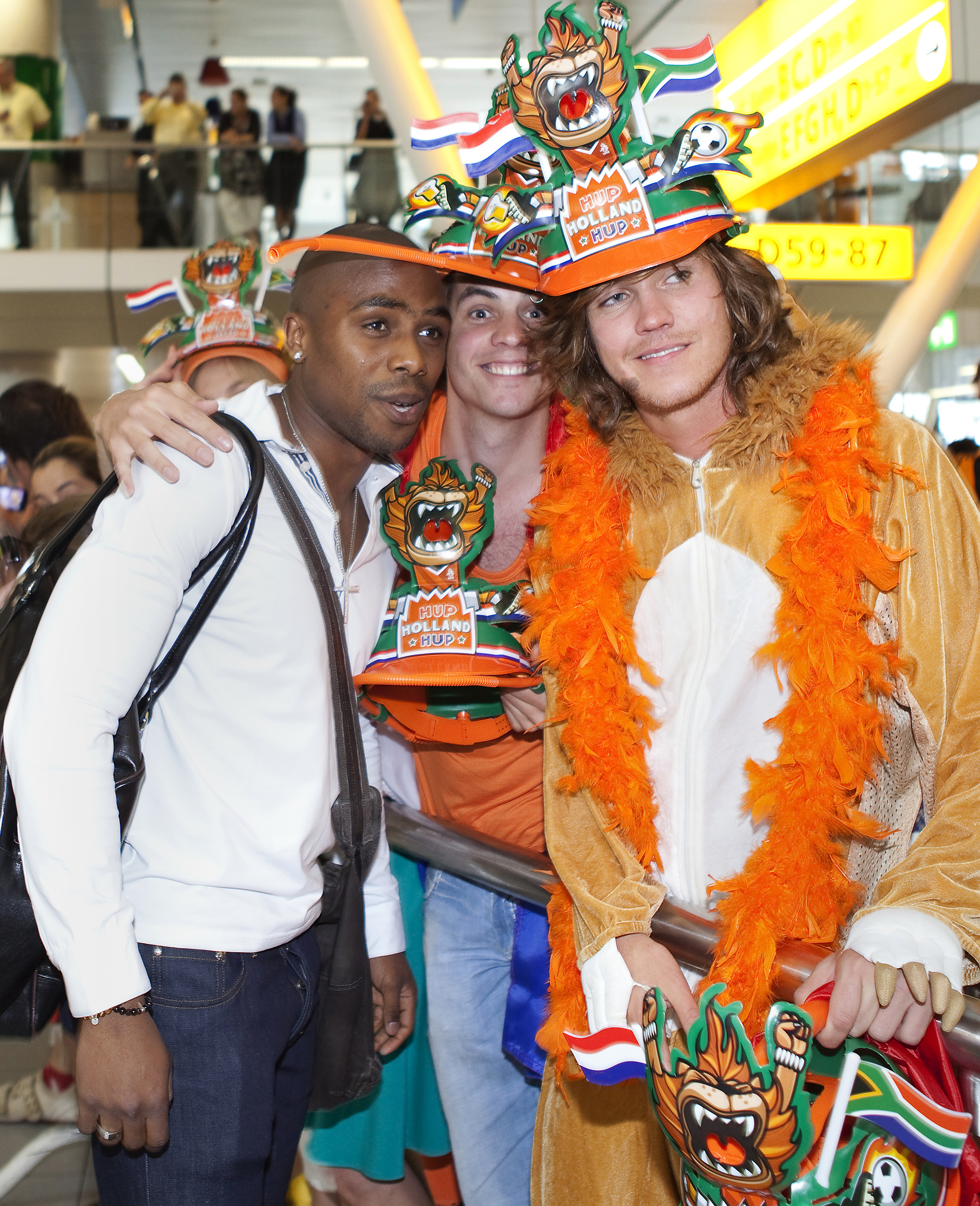
Braafheid with Dutch fans.

In 2006, Braafheid was part of the Netherlands squad that won the UEFA U-21 Championship 2006 in Portugal.

In a column in early 2008, critic Hugo Borst had named Braafheid as a true defender, and stated he should have been in the Dutch squad for Euro 2008 in Austria and Switzerland under manager Marco van Basten. Dutch fans heavily criticised the defence after Jaap Stam, Frank de Boer, and other highly rated defenders said goodbye to the Oranje shirt. Even despite the defenders since then continued to concede very few goals in the post-Stam era, defence was considered as the greatest weakness. On 11 February 2009, Braafheid made his debut for the Dutch national team against Tunisia.

=== 2008 Summer Olympics ===
In early summer of 2008, Braafheid was selected for the Dutch Olympic Squad going to Beijing, along with fellow Twente defender Rob Wielaert, as one of the three possible dispensation players. But as Twente qualified for UEFA Champions League football in play-offs by beating Ajax, Braafheid and Wielaert were no longer allowed to go, as their Champions League matches were early in the season.

=== 2010 World Cup ===
Braafheid was included in the preliminary squad for the 2010 FIFA World Cup in South Africa. On 27 May 2010, Netherlands manager Bert van Marwijk announced that the player would be part of the final squad of 23 competing in South Africa. Braafheid came on as a substitute in the World Cup final. Near the end of the second half of extra time he was hit in the back of his head by an accidental volley. Luckily, the ball fell right into the arms of the Dutch keeper Maarten Stekelenburg. The Netherlands went on to lose the match, thus making them the runners up for a third time in a World Cup final. Braafheid and the rest of his team were rewarded with a silver medal.

== Career statistics ==
=== Club ===
As of 19 December 2023

Appearances and goals by club, season and competition
Club	Season	League			Cup		Europe		Other (Note: Includes Johan Cruyff Shield, Eredivisie play-offs)		Total	
Club	Season	Division	Apps	Goals	Apps	Goals	Apps	Goals	Apps	Goals	Apps	Goals
Utrecht	2003–04	Eredivisie	14	0	0	0	1	0	0	0	15	0
Utrecht	2004–05	Eredivisie	23	0	0	0	4	0	1	0	28	0
Utrecht	2005–06	Eredivisie	31	2	0	0	0	0	1	0	32	2
Utrecht	2006–07	Eredivisie	13	0	0	0	0	0	2	0	15	0
Utrecht	Total		81	2	0	0	5	0	4	0	90	2
Twente	2006–07	Eredivisie	11	0	0	0	0	0	2	0	13	0
Twente	2007–08	Eredivisie	32	0	1	0	1	0	4	1	38	1
Twente	2008–09	Eredivisie	33	1	6	0	9	0	0	0	48	1
Twente	Total		76	1	7	0	10	0	6	1	99	2
Bayern Munich	2009–10	Bundesliga	9	0	3	0	2	0	0	0	14	0
Bayern Munich	2010–11	Bundesliga	3	0	1	0	1	0	0	0	5	0
Bayern Munich	Total		12	0	4	0	3	0	0	0	19	0
Celtic (loan)	2009–10	SPL	10	0	2	0	0	0	0	0	12	0
Celtic (loan)	Total		10	0	2	0	0	0	0	0	12	0
Hoffenheim	2010–11	Bundesliga	10	0	0	0	0	0	0	0	10	0
Hoffenheim	2011–12	Bundesliga	21	1	3	0	0	0	0	0	24	1
Hoffenheim	Total		31	1	3	0	0	0	0	0	34	1
Twente (loan)	2012–13	Eredivisie	25	0	0	0	6	0	3	1	34	0
Twente (loan)	Total		25	0	0	0	6	0	3	1	34	0
Lazio	2014–15	Serie A	16	0	2	0	0	0	0	0	18	0
Lazio	2015–16	Serie A	5	0	0	0	0	0	0	0	5	0
Lazio	Total		21	0	2	0	0	0	0	0	23	0
Utrecht	2016–17	Eredivisie	5	0	0	0	0	0	4	0	9	0
Utrecht	2017–18	Eredivisie	8	0	2	0	6	0	0	0	16	0
Utrecht	Total		13	0	2	0	6	0	4	0	25	0
Austin Bold	2019	USL Championship	15	0	0	0	0	0	0	0	15	0
Austin Bold	2020	USL Championship	1	0	0	0	0	0	0	0	1	0
Austin Bold	Total		16	0	0	0	0	0	0	0	16	0
Career total			285	4	20	0	30	0	17	2	352	6

== Honours ==
Utrecht

- Johan Cruyff Shield: 2004

Netherlands

- FIFA World Cup runner-up: 2010

== See also ==
- List of Netherlands international footballers born outside the Netherlands
