= Josué Soto =

American soccer player

Personal information
- Full name: Josué Soto Martínez
- Date of birth: December 22, 1995 (age 30)
- Place of birth: Perris, California, United States
- Height: 1.75 m (5 ft 9 in)
- Position: Defender

Youth career
- Querétaro

College career
| Years | Team | Apps | (Gls) |
| 2014 | California Baptist Lancers | 17 | (1) |

Senior career*
| Years | Team | Apps | (Gls) |
| 2016–2019 | Querétaro | 0 | (0) |
| 2016–2018 | → Cimarrones de Sonora (loan) | 46 | (0) |
| 2019 | → Austin Bold (loan) | 16 | (0) |
| 2020–2021 | Austin Bold | 23 | (0) |
- * Club domestic league appearances and goals as of April 22, 2022

Josué Soto Martínez (born December 22, 1995) is an American professional soccer player who last played as a defender for USL Championship club Austin Bold.

== Career ==
Soto played collegiately at California Baptist University in Riverside, California, where he earned All-PacWest honorable mention honors following his freshman season. Born in Perris, California, Soto attended nearby Martin Luther King High School in Riverside, where he was a four-year starter at forward for the Wolves. In 2016, the California native played with the Querétaro U-20 side, helping the club to a U-20 championship. Soto spent two-plus seasons on loan to Cimarrones de Sonora of the Ascenso MX, where he appeared in 51 matches and logging 3,529 minutes of play.

On February 5, 2019, Austin Bold FC announced that they had loaned Soto from Querétaro FC for the rest of 2019.
