= Aldo Quintanilla =

Mexican footballer (born 1995)

Personal information
- Full name: Aldo Antonio Quintanilla
- Date of birth: 18 May 1995 (age 31)
- Place of birth: Guadalupe, Nuevo León, Mexico
- Height: 1.79 m (5 ft 10 in)
- Position: Forward

Team information
- Current team: Los Angeles Force
- Number: 23

Youth career
- Tigres UANL

Senior career*
Years	Team	Apps	(Gls)
2013–2014	Tigres UANL Premier	8	(2)
2015–2016	Santos Laguna Premier	10	(2)
2017–2018	Querétaro Premier	14	(3)
2018–2019	Rio Grande Valley FC	22	(5)
2018	→ Houston Dynamo (loan)	1	(2)
2020–2021	Austin Bold	12	(1)
2022–	Los Angeles Force	12	(1)
- * Club domestic league appearances and goals as of March 31, 2023

Aldo Antonio Quintanilla Montes (Note: In this Spanish name, the first or paternal surname is Quintanilla and the second or maternal family name is Montes.) (born 18 May 1995) is a Mexican professional footballer who plays as a forward for Los Angeles Force, in the National Independent Soccer Association.

== Career ==
Quintanilla joined United Soccer League side Rio Grande Valley FC on 16 March 2018. He made his professional debut on 31 March 2018, playing in a 2–2 draw with Sacramento Republic. On 6 June 2018, Quintanilla was loaned to the Houston Dynamo for their US Open Cup game and scored a brace in a 5–0 win over NTX Rayados.

On 7 September 2020, Quintanilla joined USL Championship side Austin Bold.
