= Fabien Garcia =

French footballer (born 1994)

Personal information
- Full name: Fabien Garcia
- Date of birth: 14 July 1994 (age 32)
- Place of birth: Colomiers, France
- Height: 1.81 m (5 ft 11 in)
- Position: Centre-back

Team information
- Current team: Sanremese

Senior career*
Years	Team	Apps	(Gls)
2012–2014	US Colomiers	15	(0)
2014–2015	Guingamp B	16	(1)
2014–2015	Guingamp	0	(0)
2015–2016	Sedan	26	(2)
2016–2018	Nîmes B	18	(1)
2016–2018	Nîmes	12	(0)
2019–2021	Austin Bold	48	(6)
2022–2023	San Antonio FC	58	(3)
2024	Las Vegas Lights	15	(0)
2024–2025	Persela Lamongan	7	(0)
2025–	Sanremese	27	(2)
- * Club domestic league appearances and goals as of 25 June 2026

Fabien Garcia (born 14 July 1994) is a French professional footballer who plays as a centre-back for Sanremese.

Garcia and San Antonio FC mutually agreed to part ways on 11 January 2024.

On 23 February 2024, Garcia signed with USL Championship side Las Vegas Lights FC. Garcia's contract with Las Vegas was mutually terminated on 11 July 2024.
