= Xavier Báez =

Mexican footballer (born 1987)

Personal information
- Full name: Xavier Iván Báez Gamiño
- Date of birth: 22 July 1987 (age 39)
- Place of birth: Reynosa, Tamaulipas, Mexico
- Height: 1.73 m (5 ft 8 in)
- Position: Defensive midfielder

Youth career
- 2005–2006: Tapatío

Senior career*
Years	Team	Apps	(Gls)
2007–2013	Guadalajara	163	(52)
2013	→ Toluca (loan)	13	(12)
2014–2015	Cruz Azul	43	(0)
2016–2018	Necaxa	79	(6)
2019–2021	Austin Bold	76	(25)
- * Club domestic league appearances and goals as of 31 October 2021

Xavier Iván Báez Gamiño (born 22 July 1987) is a former Mexican professional footballer who played as a midfielder.

== Career ==
Báez debuted with Chivas on 17 April 2007 against Atlante in a 3–0 win for the Rojiblancos. He played four times for Chivas in the Clausura 2007 Tournament, and scored his first goal on April 21, 2007, in a 9–0 win over Veracruz. He was loaned to Toluca in 2013 before he was transferred to Cruz Azul as an exchange for the services of Omar Bravo ahead of the 2014 Clausura. Báez was always in the starring lineup for Cruz Azul in the Clausura 2014 and the Apertura 2014. It was confirmed by both clubs that Baez will be joining Club Necaxa for the Clausura 2016. In October 2018, he joined USL Championship expansion side Austin Bold on a three-year deal.

== Honours ==
Guadalajara

- InterLiga: 2009
- Copa Libertadores runner-up: 2010

Cruz Azul

- CONCACAF Champions League: 2013–14

Necaxa

- Ascenso MX: 15-16
- Copa MX: 2018
