= Marcelo Serrano =

Brazilian football coach and former player

Personal information
- Full name: Marcelo Augusto Silva Serrano
- Date of birth: 29 November 1979 (age 46)
- Place of birth: Nova Lima, Brazil

Team information
- Current team: Saint Kitts and Nevis (head coach)

Managerial career
- Years: Team
- 2018–2020: United States Virgin Islands
- 2019–2021: Austin Bold FC
- 2026–: Saint Kitts and Nevis

Marcelo Augusto Silva Serrano (born 29 November 1979) is a Brazilian football manager who is currently coaching the Saint Kitts and Nevis national team.

Serrano has previously worked as the head coach of the United States Virgin Islands national team and USL Championship side Austin Bold FC.

== Coaching career ==
=== United States Virgin Islands ===
Serrano was hired in January 2018 as the head coach and general manager of the United States Virgin Islands national team ahead of the FIFA World Cup qualifiers, the CONCACAF Gold Cup, and the CONCACAF Nations League.

=== Austin Bold FC ===
Serrano was introduced as the inaugural head coach of USL Championship side Austin Bold FC in 2019. He won the Copa Tejas in the first year.

== Coaching statistics ==
As of 17 November 2026

Coaching record by club and tenure
Team	From	To	Record					Ref.
Team	From	To	P	W	D	L	Win %	Ref.
U.S. Virgin Islands	1 January 2018	31 December 2020	6	2	0	4	33.3	
Austin Bold FC	3 August 2018	4 September 2021	75	27	24	24	36.0	
Saint Kitts and Nevis	4 February 2026	Present	8	4	2	2	50.0	
Total			89	33	26	30	37.1	
