= Amobi Okugo =

American soccer player

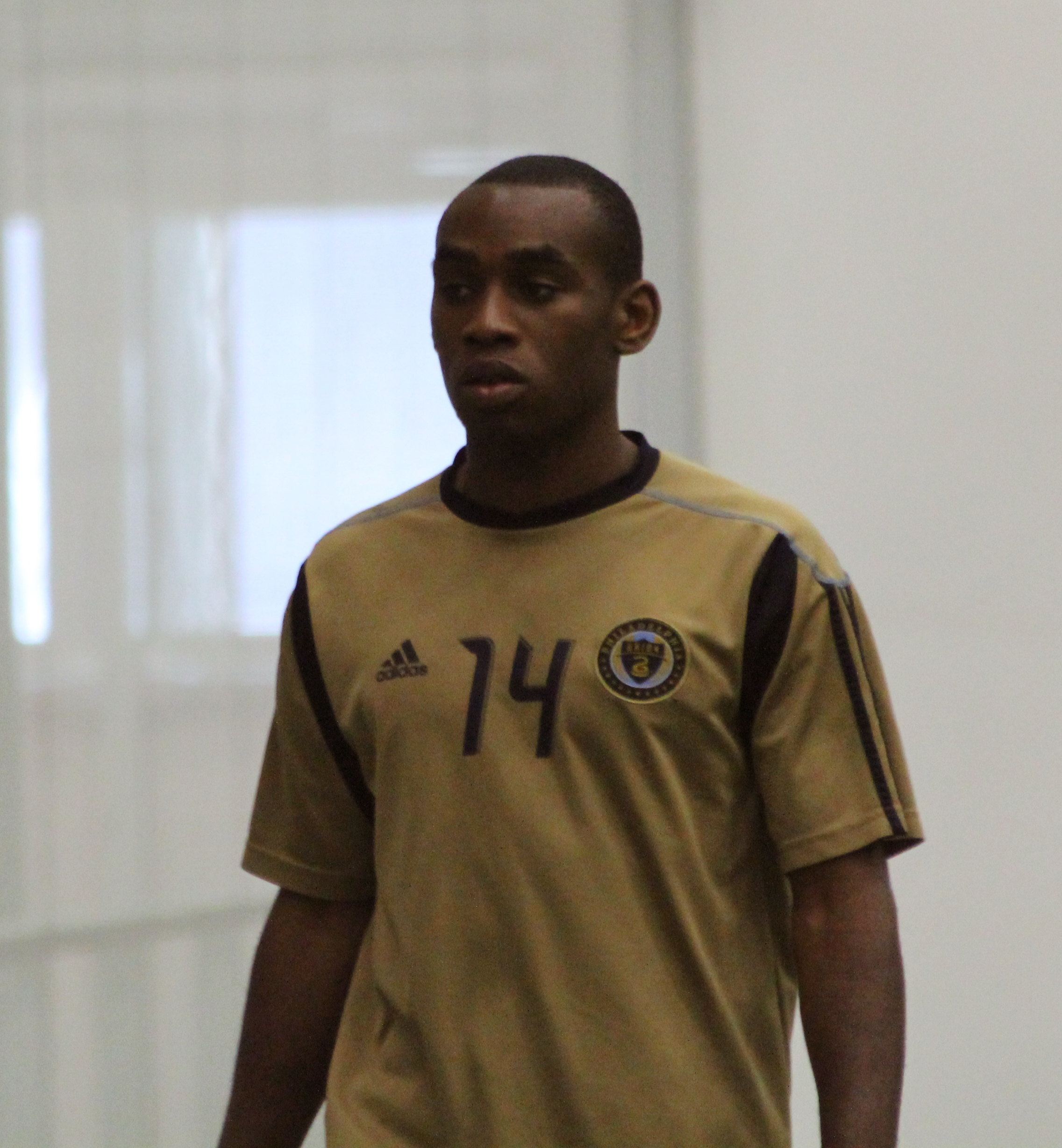
- Okugo during 2011 preseason training with the Union

Personal information
- Full name: Amobi Chidubem Okugo
- Date of birth: March 13, 1991 (age 35)
- Place of birth: Hayward, California, United States
- Height: 6 ft 0 in (1.83 m)
- Positions: Defender; defensive midfielder

Youth career
- 2006–2007: IMG Soccer Academy

College career
Years	Team	Apps	(Gls)
2009	UCLA Bruins		

Senior career*
Years	Team	Apps	(Gls)
2010–2014	Philadelphia Union	117	(5)
2015	Orlando City SC	15	(0)
2015	Sporting Kansas City	3	(0)
2016	New York Red Bulls II	1	(0)
2016–2017	Portland Timbers	14	(0)
2016–2017	→ Portland Timbers 2 (loan)	5	(0)
2019–2021	Austin Bold	74	(3)

International career^{‡}
2007	United States U17	6	(0)
2008–2011	United States U20	15	(0)
2012	United States U23	4	(0)
Medal record
Representing United States
Runner-up	CONCACAF U-20 Championship	2009
- * Club domestic league appearances and goals as of November 6, 2021 ‡ National team caps and goals as of March 27, 2012

Amobi Chidubem Okugo (born March 13, 1991) is a Nigerian-American former professional soccer player, athlete entrepreneur, strategist, and speaker. Okugo played as a midfielder and defender in Major League Soccer (MLS) and the USL Championship.

== Career ==
=== College ===
Okugo grew up in Sacramento, California, attended Rio Americano High School and Jesuit High School. He played one year of college soccer at UCLA in 2009, where he was named the 2009 Pac-10 Freshman of the Year and to the NCAA All-Freshman Team. He was a two-time Parade High School All-American and was ranked as the top high school prospect for the 2009 class by TopDrawer.

=== Professional ===
Okugo was drafted in the first round (6th overall) of the 2010 MLS SuperDraft by Philadelphia Union. He made his professional debut on March 25, 2010, in the opening game of the 2010 MLS season against Seattle Sounders FC. Over the next two seasons, he became a regular starter for the Union, anchoring the backline and occasionally playing as a defensive midfielder.

In December 2014, Okugo was traded to Orlando City SC. He later had stints with Sporting Kansas City, New York Red Bulls II, and Portland Timbers. He signed with Austin Bold FC on February 11, 2019, where he was a regular started until his retirement in 2022.

=== International ===
Okugo represented the United States at various youth levels, including the U-14 to U-23 teams. He participated in the 2009 CONCACAF Championships with the U-20s and the 2009 Australian Youth Festival with the U-18s. He was also part of the U-23 Olympic squad that competed in the 2012 Olympic qualifying campaign.

== Career statistics ==
As of April 26, 2019

Club	Season	League		MLS Cup/Playoffs		US Open Cup		CONCACAF		Total	
Club	Season	Apps	Goals	Apps	Goals	Apps	Goals	Apps	Goals	Apps	Goals
Philadelphia Union	2010	11	0	0	0	1	0	0	0	12	0
Philadelphia Union	2011	15	0	0	0	0	0	0	0	15	0
Philadelphia Union	2012	27	0	0	0	4	0	0	0	31	0
Philadelphia Union	2013	32	3	0	0	2	0	0	0	34	3
Philadelphia Union	2014	32	2	0	0	3	1	0	0	35	3
Philadelphia Union	Total	117	5	0	0	10	1	0	0	127	6
Orlando City SC	2015	15	0	0	0	2	0	0	0	17	0
Orlando City SC	Total	15	0	0	0	2	0	0	0	17	0
Sporting Kansas City	2015	3	0	0	0	0	0	0	0	3	0
Sporting Kansas City	Total	3	0	0	0	0	0	0	0	3	0
New York Red Bulls II	2016	1	0	0	0	0	0	0	0	1	0
New York Red Bulls II	Total	1	0	0	0	0	0	0	0	1	0
Portland Timbers	2016	4	0	0	0	1	0	2	0	7	0
Portland Timbers	2017	10	0	0	0	0	0	0	0	10	0
Portland Timbers	Total	14	0	0	0	1	0	2	0	17	0
Portland Timbers 2 (loan)	2016	3	0	0	0	0	0	0	0	3	0
Portland Timbers 2 (loan)	2017	2	0	0	0	0	0	0	0	2	0
Portland Timbers 2 (loan)	Total	5	0	0	0	0	0	0	0	5	0
Austin Bold	2019	32	2	0	0	3	0	0	0	32	2
Austin Bold	2020	16	0	0	0	0	0	0	0	16	0
Austin Bold	2021	26	1	0	0	0	0	0	0	26	1
Austin Bold	Total	7	0	0	0	0	0	0	0	7	0
Career totals		162	5	0	0	13	1	2	0	177	6

== Personal ==
Okugo was born to Nigerian parents and grew up admiring Nigerian international players like Jay-Jay Okocha, Sunday Oliseh, and John Obi Mikel. In addition to his soccer career, Okugo mentors young soccer players and runs a website called "Frugal Athlete " which promotes financial literacy and prudent financial practices among athletes and the general public.

Okugo earned a bachelor's degree in Organizational Leadership and Development with a minor in Business Administration and a Master's in Legal Studies [Sports Law] from Arizona State University. In 2021, he was named to Forbes' "30 Under 30" list for his work with Frugal Athlete.

Currently, Okugo is a multi-hyphenate entrepreneur, building ventures across sports, business, health and wellness, hospitality, and media. He also founded The Ok U Go Foundation, which focuses on providing underserved youth with access to soccer development, financial literacy, and after-school programs.
