= Jermaine Taylor (footballer) =

Jamaican footballer (born 1985)

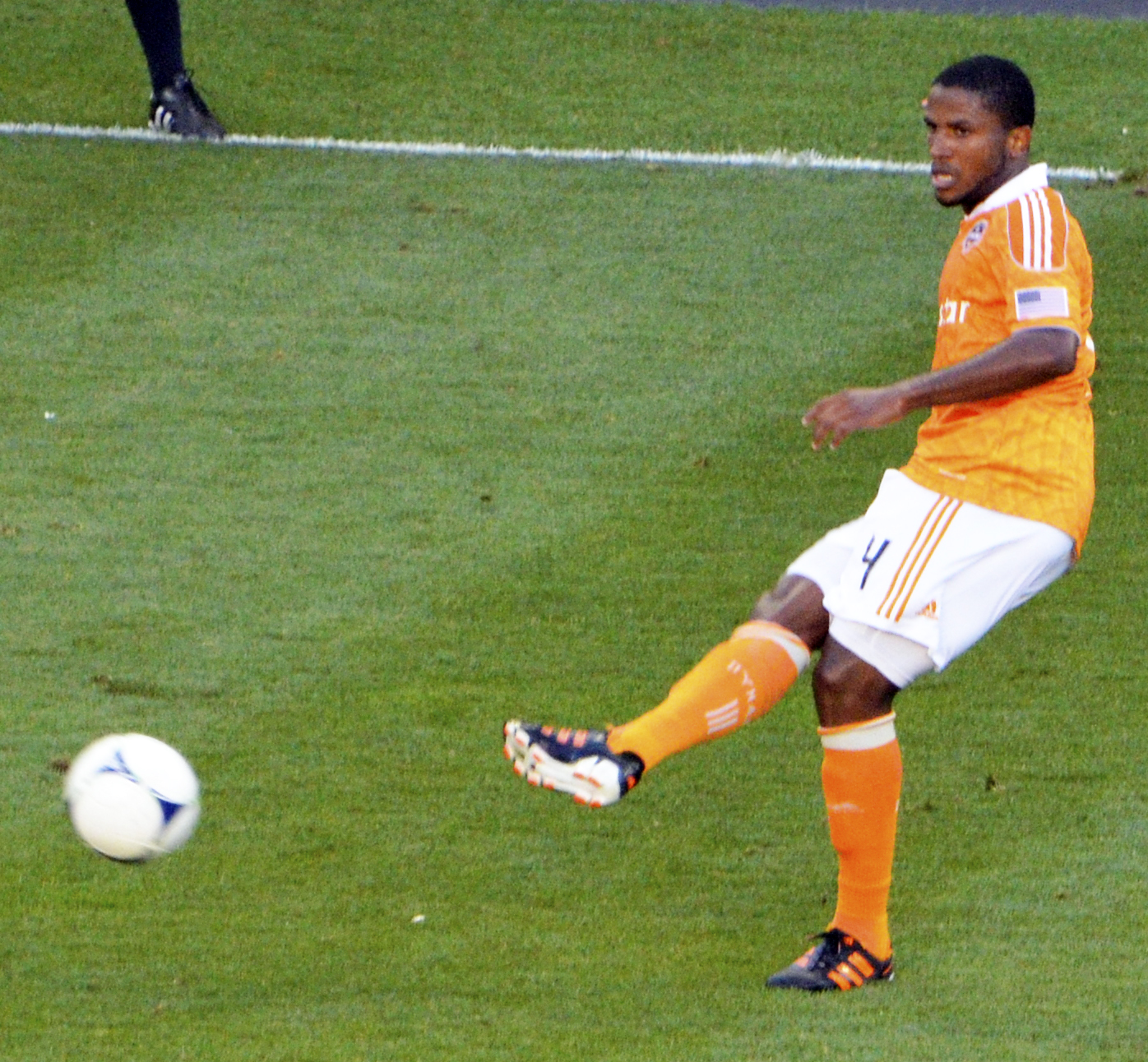
- Taylor playing for Houston Dynamo

Personal information
- Full name: Jermaine Omar Taylor
- Date of birth: 14 January 1985 (age 41)
- Place of birth: Portland, Jamaica
- Height: 1.81 m (5 ft 11 in)
- Position: Defender

Senior career*
Years	Team	Apps	(Gls)
2004–2009	Harbour View	62	(0)
2009–2011	St. George's SC	48	(0)
2011–2015	Houston Dynamo	106	(1)
2016	Portland Timbers	23	(0)
2017	Minnesota United	14	(0)
2019–2021	Austin Bold	64	(0)

International career^{‡}
2004–2017	Jamaica	101	(0)
Medal record
Men's football
Representing Jamaica
CONCACAF Gold Cup
Runner-up	2015 United States–Canada	Team
Runner-up	2017 United States	Team
- * Club domestic league appearances and goals as of 6 November 2021 ‡ National team caps and goals as of 7 October 2017

Jermaine Omar Taylor (born 14 January 1985) is a Jamaican former professional footballer who played as a defender.

== Club career ==
=== Jamaica ===
Born in Portland, Jamaica, Taylor started his senior career as a first team regular by the age of 19. While at Harbour View, Taylor won the CFU Club Championship and the National Premier League. In 2009, Taylor moved to Portland to play along with his brother Ricardo Taylor for St. George's SC.

=== United States ===
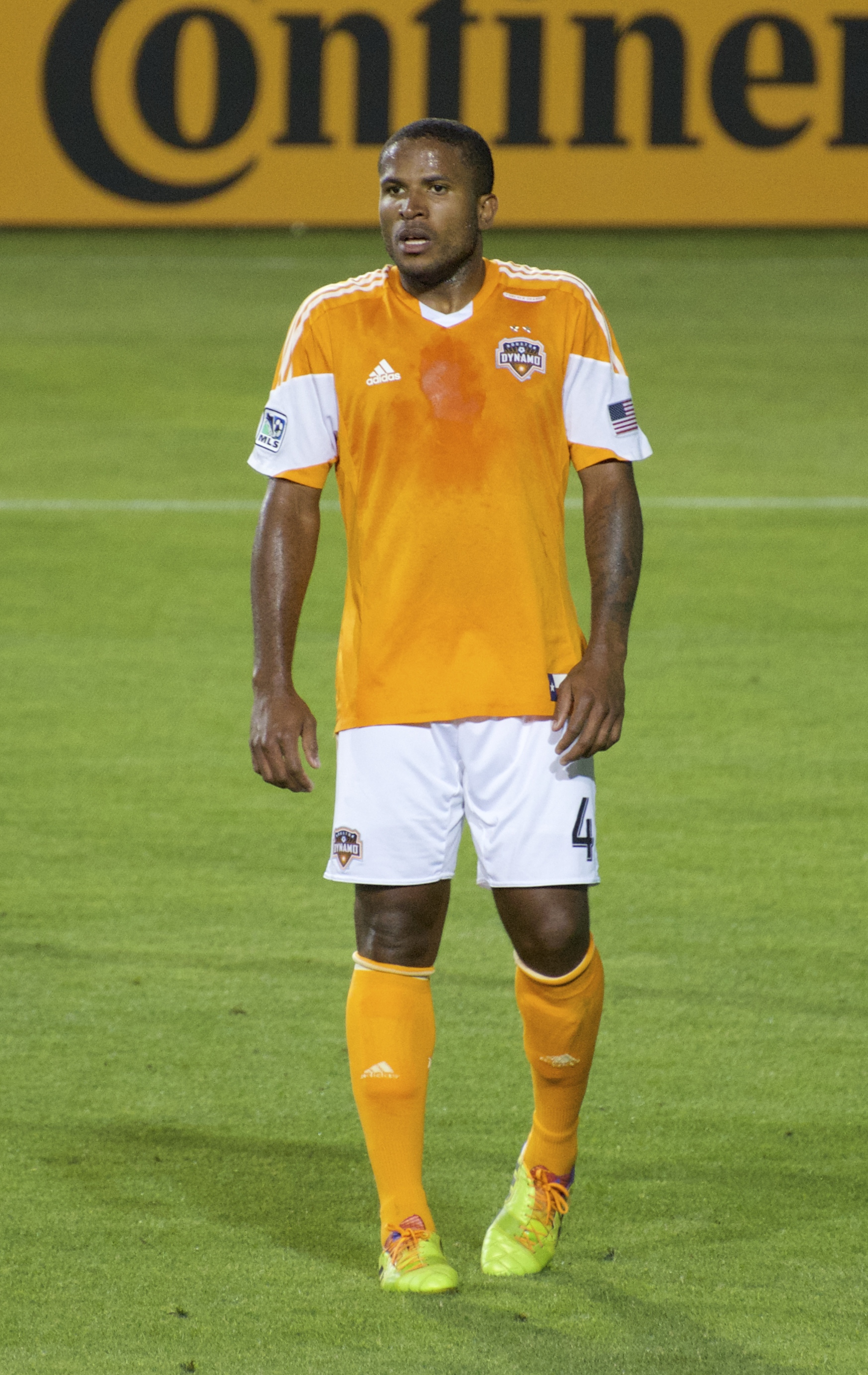
Talyor with the Dynamo

==== Houston Dynamo ====
In February 2011 it was reported that Taylor would be joining Houston Dynamo in Major League Soccer with the American club paying a transfer fee to St. George's SC. The American club had scouted Taylor during the 2010 Digicel Caribbean Cup. Taylor signed with Houston on 16 February 2011.

==== Portland Timbers ====
After the 2015 MLS season the Houston Dynamo did not pick up Taylor's option, making him eligible for the 2015 MLS Re-Entry Draft. In the second stage he was selected by the Portland Timbers with the 20th pick. On 22 January 2016, Taylor signed with the Portland Timbers.

==== Minnesota United FC ====
It was announced on 24 January 2017, that Minnesota United FC had signed Taylor as the team began its first season in Major League Soccer. His option was not renewed at the end of the 2017 season.

==== Austin Bold FC ====
On 23 January 2019, Taylor joined USL Championship side Austin Bold ahead of their inaugural season.

== International career ==
Taylor has been capped at U-17, U-20, U-23 and national level for Jamaica. He made his debut for the senior side in 2004 and has been a regular since.

Along with teammates Andre Blake and Kemar Lawrence he was named in the Gold Cup Tournament Best XI in 2017. Jamaica played USMNT in the final, losing 2–1.

In late 2017, he was included in a Sports Illustrated list of active players with 100 or more international caps. However, the Jamaica Football Federation recorded only 99 matches.

== Honours ==
Jamaica

- Caribbean Cup: 2005, 2010, 2014

Harbour View

- Jamaica National Premier League: 2017
- CFU Club Championship: 2004

Houston Dynamo

- Major League Soccer Eastern Conference Championship: 2011, 2012

Individual

- CONCACAF Gold Cup Best XI: 2017

== See also ==
- List of men's footballers with 100 or more international caps
