= Sonny Guadarrama =

American soccer player

Personal information
- Full name: Sonny Alejandro Guadarrama Bermúdez
- Date of birth: March 27, 1987 (age 39)
- Place of birth: Austin, Texas, United States
- Height: 1.70 m (5 ft 7 in)
- Position: Midfielder

College career
Years	Team	Apps	(Gls)
2005–2006	Campbell Fighting Camels		

Senior career*
Years	Team	Apps	(Gls)
2004–2006	Austin Lightning	25	(17)
2006–2007	Santos Laguna	9	(0)
2008–2010	Mérida	31	(2)
2010–2016	Atlante	38	(2)
2011–2013	→ Mérida (loan)	29	(11)
2013–2014	→ Necaxa (loan)	37	(4)
2016	→ Sinaloa (loan)	4	(0)
2018	San Antonio FC	17	(0)
2019–2021	Austin Bold	38	(5)
- * Club domestic league appearances and goals as of October 31, 2021

Sonny Alejandro Guadarrama Bermúdez (born March 27, 1987) is an American professional soccer player who plays as a midfielder.

== Club career ==
=== San Antonio FC ===
On February 23, 2018, Guadarrama was signed to San Antonio FC of the United Soccer League.

=== Austin Bold ===
On November 6, it was announced that Guadarrama would join Austin Bold FC ahead of their inaugural season in the USL Championship. Guadarrama left Austin following the 2020 season, but returned to the club on September 15, 2021.
