= André Lima (footballer, born May 1985) =

Brazilian footballer (born 1985)

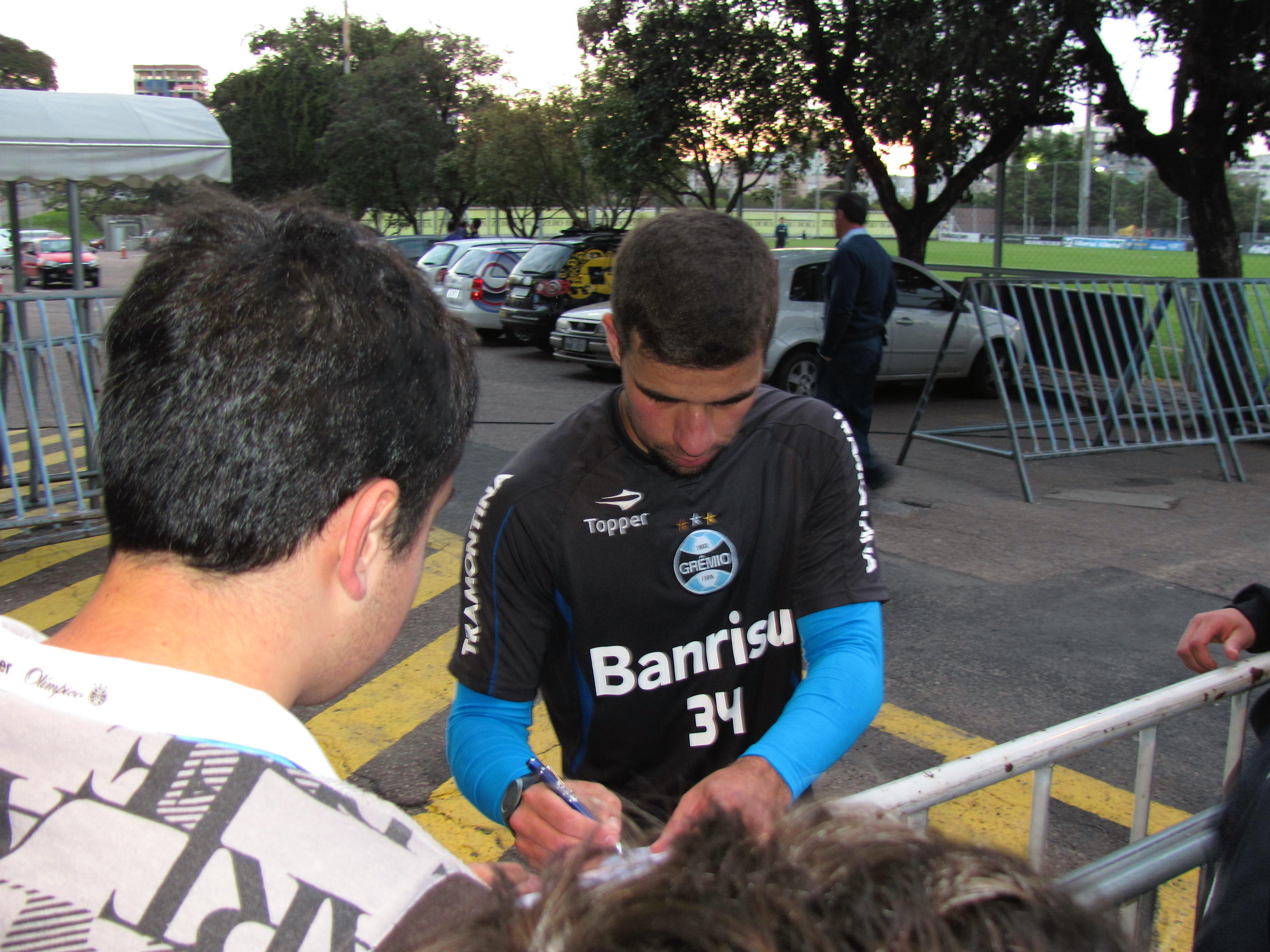
- Lima in 2012 with Grêmio

Personal information
- Full name: André Luiz Barretto Silva Lima
- Date of birth: 3 May 1985 (age 41)
- Place of birth: Rio de Janeiro, Brazil
- Height: 1.85 m (6 ft 1 in)
- Position: Striker

Youth career
- –2004: Vasco da Gama

Senior career*
Years	Team	Apps	(Gls)
2004–2005	Vasco da Gama	19	(1)
2005–2006	Germinal Beerschot	5	(1)
2006	Madureira	4	(1)
2006	Sampaio Corrêa	22	(15)
2007	Botafogo	22	(8)
2007–2010	Hertha BSC	16	(2)
2008–2009	→ São Paulo (loan)	19	(4)
2009	→ Botafogo (loan)	22	(7)
2010	→ Fluminense (loan)	4	(0)
2010	→ Grêmio (loan)	21	(11)
2011–2013	Grêmio	54	(17)
2013–2014	Beijing Guoan	14	(2)
2013	→ Vitória (loan)	1	(0)
2015	Avaí	25	(10)
2016	Atlético Paranaense	26	(5)
2017–2018	Vitória	41	(8)
2019–2020	Austin Bold	34	(15)
- * Club domestic league appearances and goals as of 23 August 2020

André Luiz Barreto Silva Lima (born 3 May 1985) is a Brazilian former professional footballer who last played as a striker for Austin Bold. He played as a striker.

== Club career ==
Born in Rio de Janeiro, André Lima was a youth player with Vasco da Gama until 2004 when he joined the senior team. Lima played for various teams in Brazil, as well as Germinal Beerschot in Belgium, before joining Botafogo. He was the joint top-scorer for Botafogo for the 2007 Copa do Brasil, in which they lost in the semifinal.

On 28 August 2007, Lima signed a four-year contract with Bundesliga side Hertha BSC with a transfer fee of €3.5 million. In Lima's first season, he played 16 games, scoring two goals. Lima was the third choice striker for Hertha coach Lucien Favre, and struggled in his first season. As a result, Lima was sent on loan to São Paulo on 28 June 2008 for a year long loan.

Lima would go on to be loaned to several additional Brazilian sides. This included scoring 14 goals across all competitions for Botafogo in their 2009 season. However, general manager Michael Preetz indicated that Hertha already had two strikers and were looking for a team to buy Lima. Lima would be loaned out again, this time to Grêmio, where he would play for three years.

On 17 February 2013, Lima was signed by Chinese Super League side Beijing Guoan. After leaving Beijing Guoan, he would continue to play in the Brazilian first division, playing for Avaí FC, Atlético Paranaense, and Vitória.

On 24 January 2019, Lima joined Austin Bold FC of the USL Championship. During the COVID-19 crisis, Lima opted to stay with his family in Orlando, Florida and mutually agreed to terminate his contract with Austin.

== Honours ==
- Copa do Brasil top scorer: 2007
