= Austin Bold FC =

American soccer team

- Full name: Austin Bold Football Club
- Founded: August 9, 2017; 8 years ago
- Dissolved: November 4, 2021; 4 years ago
- Stadium: Bold Stadium
- Capacity: 5,000
- Chairman: Bobby Stein
- Head coach: Ryan Thompson
- League: USL Championship
- 2021: 6th, Mountain Division; 9th, Western Conference; Playoffs: DNQ
- Website: www.austinboldfc.com
Home colors	Away colors

Austin Bold FC (ABFC) was an American professional soccer team located in Austin, Texas. Founded in 2017, the team made its debut in the USL Championship in 2019. In 2021, Austin Bold FC announced it would be moving to Fort Worth, Texas leaving Circuit of the Americas at the end of the season but may have to wait until 2023, depending on the construction of their stadium.

== History ==
=== Founding and Early Years (2017–2018) ===
The USL announced the return of professional soccer to Austin for the 2019 season on August 9, 2017, with Circuit of The Americas chairman Bobby Stein leading the ownership group and securing approval for a permanent home venue at the Circuit of The Americas.

The club entered the United Soccer League in 2019.

== Stadium ==
The club played at Bold Stadium on the grounds of the Circuit of the Americas race track, located between the amphitheater and the grand plaza. The first goal in the stadium was scored by Kleber Giacomazzi in a 1–0 win against San Antonio FC on March 30, 2019.

== Ownership ==
Bobby Stein, chairman of the Circuit of the Americas, has led the ownership group after becoming majority owner in 2017. He became involved in a public relations battle with Anthony Precourt, the primary owner of Austin FC, who had been sanctioned by Major League Soccer to create a franchise in Austin after selling his stake in the Columbus Crew amid controversy. Stein was criticized for his tactics, including hiring petition campaigners who are accused of lying to the public.

In December 2021, a new ownership group was approved by the USL. The new ownership group consists of Donnie Nelson, Neil Leibman, and Stein. The team did not participate in the 2022 USL Championship as it sought relocation to another city in Texas, and has not participated since, as they were never able to get any stadium deal done.

== Sponsorship ==
Period	Kit Manufacturer	Shirt Sponsor
2019–2020	BLK	Ascension Seton
2021	Puma	Ascension Seton

== Players and staff ==
=== Roster ===
As of September 15, 2021

No.	Pos.	Player	Nation

=== Staff ===
As of September 4, 2021

- Rick Abbott – acting general manager
- Brandon Brock - Director, Ticket Sales
- Catherine Ryland – team administrator
- Marcelo Serrano - sporting director
- Ryan Thompson – head coach
- Vacant – assistant coach
- Michael Alcaraz – goalkeeper coach
- Ally Furey – head athletic trainer
- Sarah Khalifa – assistant athletic trainer / assistant performance coach

== Team records ==
=== Year-by-year ===
As of December 20, 2022

Season	USL Championship								Play-offs	U.S. Open Cup	Top scorer ^{1}		Head coach
Season	P	W	L	D	GF	GA	Pts	Pos	Play-offs	U.S. Open Cup	Player	Goals	Head coach
2019	34	13	12	9	53	52	48	8th, Western	Conference quarterfinals	4th Round	(Brazil) André Lima	14	(Brazil) Marcelo Serrano
2020	16	5	4	7	30	27	22	3rd, Western; Group D	Did not qualify	Cancelled	(Turks and Caicos Islands) Billy Forbes	7	(Brazil) Marcelo Serrano
2021	32	10	10	12	32	42	42	6th, Mountain	Did not qualify	Cancelled	(Mexico) Xavier Báez	6	(Jamaica) Ryan Thompson

1. Top scorer includes statistics from league matches only.

=== Head coaches ===
- Includes USL regular season, USL playoffs, U.S. Open Cup. Excludes friendlies.

Coach	Nationality	Start	End	Games	Win	Loss	Draw	Win %
Marcelo Augusto Silva Serrano	Brazil	August 3, 2018	September 4, 2021	75	27	24	24	36.00
Ryan Thompson	Jamaica	September 4, 2021	present	12	4	4	4	33.33

=== Average attendance ===
Year	Reg. season	Playoffs
2019	2,395	2,656
2020 (Note: Due to COVID-19, attendance at games was restricted)	2496	DNQ
2021	957	DNQ

== Honors ==
=== Minor ===
- Copa Tejas (Division 2)
  - Winners (1): 2019
