= 2019 Sacramento Republic FC season =

Sacramento Republic FC
2019 season
- Owner: Kevin M. Nagle
- Head coach: Simon Elliott
- Stadium: Papa Murphy's Park
- USL Championship: 7th (Western Conference)
- USL Playoffs: Conference Quarterfinals
- U.S. Open Cup: Fourth Round
- Highest home attendance: League/All: 11,569 (April 6 vs. Austin Bold FC) (April 27 vs. Phoenix Rising FC) (July 13 vs. Portland Timbers 2) (October 12 vs. Orange County SC)
- Lowest home attendance: League: 9,324 (October 2 vs. LA Galaxy II); All: 400 (May 15 vs. Reno 1868 FC (USOC))
- Average home league attendance: 11,088
- Biggest win: 6–0 (June 22 vs. Tulsa)
- Biggest defeat: –3 goals (3 times); 1–4 (May 11 vs. Reno 1868 FC); 0–3 (October 19 at Real Monarchs); 0–3 (November 2 at El Paso)
Home colors	Away colors

The 2019 Sacramento Republic FC season was the club's sixth season of existence. The club is playing in the USL Championship, the second tier of the American soccer pyramid. Sacramento Republic FC competed in the Western Conference of the USL Championship.

== Club ==
=== Roster ===
As of July 18, 2019

No.	Position	Nation	Player
1	GK	USA	Bobby Shuttleworth (on loan from Minnesota United FC)
2	DF	TTO	Shannon Gomez
4	DF	USA	Mitchell Taintor
5	DF	USA	Matt Mahoney
6	DF	GER	Charalampos Chantzopoulos
7	MF	USA	Hayden Partain
9	FW	POL	Dariusz Formella
10	MF	CAN	Keven Alemán
11	MF	USA	Sam Werner
12	MF	USA	Drew Skundrich
15	DF	ESA	Juan Barahona
18	GK	DOM	Rafael Díaz
20	MF	BUL	Villyan Bijev
21	DF	ISR	Dekel Keinan
23	FW	DEN	Thomas Enevoldsen
24	MF	USA	Jaime Villarreal
25	MF	USA	Ray Saari
26	DF	USA	Elliott Hord
29	FW	USA	Stefano Bonomo
30	DF	USA	Jordan McCrary
31	FW	USA	Cameron Iwasa
46	MF	USA	Mario Penagos
47	DF	USA	Hayden Sargis
48	DF	USA	Eddy Berumen

Sacramento Republic FC Academy player

=== Staff ===
As of December 12, 2018

Position	Name
General Manager	(United States) Todd Dunivant
Head Coach	(New Zealand) Simon Elliott
Head Assistant Coach	(United States) Benjamin Ziemer
Goalkeeper Coach	(France) Romuald Peiser
Strength and Conditioning Coach	(United States) Luke Rayfield
Head Athletic Trainer	(United States) Aung Aye

== Competitions ==
=== Preseason ===
February 9	Sacramento Republic FC	5–0	Sacramento Gold	Sacramento, California
19:00 PST	Iwasa 11'; Bonomo 68'; Butler 80'; Partain 82'; Blackwood 88'	Report		Stadium: American River College Soccer Stadium

February 13	Ventura County Fusion	1–9	Sacramento Republic FC	Ventura, California
19:30 PST	Goal	Report	Blackwood; Butler; Bonomo; Iwasa,, Bijev, Skundrich	Stadium: Ventura College Sportsplex

February 16	LA Galaxy II	0–1	Sacramento Republic FC	Carson, California
12:30 PST		Report	Bijev	Stadium: Dignity Health Sports Park

February 23	Sacramento Republic FC	4–1	Reno 1868 FC	Davis, California
	Bonomo 16', 79'; Skundrich 30'; Blackwood 42'; (yellow card) 67'	Report	Brown (yellow card) 41', (goal) 78'; Seymore (yellow card) 84'	Stadium: Davis Legacy Soccer Complex

February 23	Sacramento Republic FC	1–0	Reno 1868 FC	Davis, California
	Partain 85'	Report	Fuentes (yellow card) 11'	Stadium: Davis Legacy Soccer Complex

March 2	Sacramento Republic FC	v	UC Davis Aggies	Sacramento, California
				Stadium: Papa Murphy's Park; Attendance: Closed-door

=== USL Championship ===
==== Standings ====
Pos	Team	Pld	W	D	L	GF	GA	GD	Pts	Qualification
5	Orange County SC	34	15	9	10	54	43	+11	54	Conference Quarterfinals
6	El Paso Locomotive FC	34	13	11	10	42	36	+6	50	Conference Quarterfinals
7	Sacramento Republic	34	14	6	14	50	43	+7	48	Play-In Round
8	Austin Bold FC	34	13	9	12	53	52	+1	48	Play-In Round
9	LA Galaxy II	34	12	12	10	59	62	−3	48	Play-In Round

Source: USL Championship Standings
Rules for classification: 1) total wins; 2) total goal differential; 3) total goals scored; 4) points earned against top four Conference finishers; 5) disciplinary points; 6) coin toss or drawing of lots

==== Match results ====
On December 19, 2018, the USL announced that their 2019 season schedule.

Win Draw Loss Upcoming fixture

Unless otherwise noted, all times in PDT (UTC-06)

March 9 1	Sacramento Republic FC	1–1	Real Monarchs	Sacramento, California
7:30 PM	Iwasa (yellow card) 11'; Chantzopoulos 81'	Report	Chang (yellow card) 25'; Blake 35' (pen.); Ávila (yellow card) 80'; Kacher (yellow card) 90+4'	Stadium: Papa Murphy's Park; Attendance: 10,086; Referee: Farhad Dadkho

March 16 2	Colorado Springs Switchbacks FC	0–1	Sacramento Republic FC	Colorado Springs, Colorado
5:00 PM	Jack (yellow card) 56'	Report	Iwasa 57' (pen.); Skundrich (yellow card) 78'	Stadium: Weidner Field; Attendance: 2,862; Referee: Guido Gonzales, Jr.

March 24 3	Sacramento Republic FC	4–1	OKC Energy FC	Sacramento, California
2:00 PM	Iwasa 16', 21' (pen.), 27'; Werner 45+4'; Saari (yellow card) 47'; Skundrich (yellow card) 80'; Blackwood (yellow card) 90+2'	Report	R. Garcia 29', (yellow card) 69'	Stadium: Papa Murphy's Park; Attendance: 9,857; Referee: Mark Allatin

April 1 4	Tacoma Defiance	2–1	Sacramento Republic FC	Tacoma, Washington
7:00 PM	Leyva (yellow card) 22'; Wingo 50'; Bruin 78'	Report	Keinan (yellow card) 55'; Iwasa 88' (pen.)	Stadium: Cheney Stadium; Attendance: 1,396; Referee: Alejandro Aguilera

April 6 5	Sacramento Republic FC	1–0	Austin Bold FC	Sacramento, California
7:30 PM	Keinan (yellow card) 44'; Saari (yellow card) 64'; Taylor 85' (o.g.)	Report	Kléber (yellow card) 12'; Troncoso (yellow card) 30'	Stadium: Papa Murphy's Park; Attendance: 11,569; Referee: Calin Radosav

April 13 6	Portland Timbers 2	1–0	Sacramento Republic FC	Portland, Oregon
7:00 PM	Jadama 29' (pen.)	Report	Bijev (yellow card) 57' (yellow-red card) 63'; Chantzopoulos (yellow card) 78' (yellow-red card) 90+1'; Saari (yellow card) 84'	Stadium: Providence Park; Attendance: 1,116; Referee: Mike Hohnholz

April 27 7	Sacramento Republic FC	0–0	Phoenix Rising FC	Sacramento, California
7:30 PM	Gomez (yellow card) 53'; Alemán (yellow card) 81'	Report	Fernandez (yellow card) 10'	Stadium: Papa Murphy's Park; Attendance: 11,569; Referee: Elton Garcia

May 4 8	Las Vegas Lights FC	4–2	Sacramento Republic FC	Las Vegas, Nevada
7:30 PM	Parra 67'; Robinson 71'; Echavarria 75'; Sandoval 90'	Report	Partain 51'; Blackwood 90+4'	Stadium: Cashman Field; Attendance: 7,487; Referee: Malik Badawi

May 8 9	Fresno FC	0–1	Sacramento Republic FC	Fresno, California
7:30 PM	Chaney (yellow card) 41'; Jackson (yellow card) 74'	Report	Keinan (yellow card) 26'; Werner 29'; McCrary (yellow card) 49'; Cohen (yellow card) 89'	Stadium: Chukchansi Park; Attendance: 2,968; Referee: Luis Guardia

May 11 10	Sacramento Republic FC	1–4	Reno 1868 FC	Sacramento, California
7:30 PM	Taintor 12'; McCrary (yellow card) 19'; Keinan (yellow card) 46'	Report	Hertzog 24', (yellow card) 80', (goal) 88'; Brown 31'; Mfeka (yellow card) 52'; Mendiola 83'; Partida (yellow card) 85'	Stadium: Papa Murphy's Park; Attendance: 10,630; Referee: Farhad Dadkho

May 18 11	El Paso Locomotive FC	3–1	Sacramento Republic FC	El Paso, Texas
7:30 PM	Rezende 10'; Kiesewetter 63', 73'; Herrera (yellow card) 88'; Salgado (yellow card) 90'	Report	Skundrich 35'	Stadium: Southwest University Park; Attendance: 5,667; Referee: Thomas Snyder

June 1 12	Sacramento Republic FC	2–1	San Antonio FC	Sacramento, California
8:00 PM	Keinan (yellow card) 11'; Yaro 78' (o.g.); Werner 83'; McCrary 90+5'	Report	Eboussi (yellow card) 39'; Lahoud (yellow card) 69', (goal) 90+1'; Ackon (yellow card) 79'; Restrepo (yellow card) 90+5'	Stadium: Papa Murphy's Park; Attendance: 10,020; Referee: Lukasz Szpala

June 8 13	New Mexico United	0–3	Sacramento Republic FC	Albuquerque, New Mexico
6:30 PM	Frater (yellow card) 35'; Padilla (yellow card) 60'; Guzman (yellow card) 61'	Report	Iwasa 32' (pen.), 90'; Mahoney 77'; Saari (yellow card) 85'	Stadium: Isotopes Park; Attendance: 14,780; Referee: Elvis Osmanovic

June 22 14	Sacramento Republic FC	6–0	Tulsa Roughnecks FC	Sacramento, California
8:00 PM	Taintor 8', (yellow card) 34'; Iwasa 44', 70'; Bonomo 48', 74'; Werner 80'; Alemán (yellow card) 90'	Report	Roberts (yellow card) 50'	Stadium: Papa Murphy's Park; Attendance: 9,522; Referee: Alejandro Aguilera, Jr.

June 29 15	Reno 1868 FC	2–0	Sacramento Republic FC	Reno, Nevada
7:30 PM	Mendiola 35'; Rivas 60'	Report	Saari (yellow card) 44'	Stadium: Greater Nevada Field; Attendance: 4,498; Referee: Jon Freemon

July 3 16	Sacramento Republic FC	0–1	Fresno FC	Sacramento, California
8:00 PM	Keinan (red card) 73'; McCrary (yellow card) 90+4'	Report	del Campo (yellow card) 60'; Lawal (yellow card) 63'; Chavez (red card) 73'; Casillas 77'	Stadium: Papa Murphy's Park; Attendance: 9,677; Referee: Dejan Susak

July 13 17	Sacramento Republic FC	1–0	Portland Timbers 2	Sacramento, California
8:00 PM	Partain 41'; Taintor (yellow card) 47'	Report	Tuiloma (yellow card) 36'; Langsdorf (yellow card) 47'; Leeker (yellow card) 66'; Smith (yellow card) 73'; Kobayashi (yellow card) 82'; Calixtro (yellow card) 86'	Stadium: Papa Murphy's Park; Attendance: 11,569; Referee: Lukasz Szpala

July 20 18	Rio Grande Valley FC Toros	2–1	Sacramento Republic FC	Edinburg, Texas
7:30 PM	Cabrera 32'; Small (yellow card) 87'; Adams 90'; Lemoine (yellow card) 90+2'	Report	Martinez 84' (o.g.); Chantzopoulos (yellow card) 87'; Mahoney (yellow card) 90+1'	Stadium: H-E-B Park; Attendance: 2,408; Referee: Matthew Thompson

July 24 19	Sacramento Republic FC	1–2	New Mexico United	Sacramento, California
8:00 PM	Iwasa (yellow card) 53'; Taintor (yellow card) 66'; Werner 75'	Report	Wehan 10'; Moar (yellow card) 36'; Sandoval (yellow card) 44'; Bruce 89'	Stadium: Papa Murphy's Park; Attendance: 10,523; Referee: Elijio Arreguin

July 27 20	Orange County SC	0–0	Sacramento Republic FC	Irvine, California
7:00 PM		Report	Keinan (yellow card) 87'	Stadium: Championship Soccer Stadium; Attendance: 2,860; Referee: Sergii Demianchuk

August 3 21	San Antonio FC	2–3	Sacramento Republic FC	San Antonio, Texas
7:30 p.m. CDT	López (yellow card) 14'; Barmby 51'; Pecka (yellow card) 87', (goal) 90+5'	Report	Bonomo 21', 45'; Iwasa 33'; Alemán (yellow card) 45+3'; McCrary (yellow card) 75'; Werner (yellow card) 86'; Díaz (yellow card) 87'	Stadium: Toyota Field; Attendance: 6,243; Referee: Daniel Gutierrez

August 7 22	Sacramento Republic FC	0–0	Las Vegas Lights	Sacramento, California
8:00 PM	Alemán (yellow card) 32'; Mahoney (yellow card) 46'; Barahona (yellow card) 87'	Report	Torres (yellow card) 26'; Parra (yellow card) 31'; Tabortetaka (yellow card) 70'	Stadium: Papa Murphy's Park; Attendance: 10,431; Referee: Mark Allatin

August 17 23	Sacramento Republic FC	4–0	Colorado Springs Switchbacks	Sacramento, California
8:00 PM	Barahona (yellow card) 24'; Villareal 31'; Enevoldsen 57', 60'; Iwasa 72'; Partain (yellow card) 80'	Report	Hundley (yellow card) 43'; Burt (yellow card) 48'	Stadium: Papa Murphy's Park; Attendance: 9,350; Referee: Thomas Snyder

August 23 24	Phoenix Rising FC	2–1	Sacramento Republic FC	Scottsdale, Arizona
7:30pm	Barahona 7' (o.g.); Farrell 44'; Vassell (yellow card) 66'; Mala (yellow card) 85' (yellow-red card) 90'	Report	Iwasa 2'; Barahona (yellow card) 49'; McCrary (yellow card) 70'	Stadium: Casino Arizona Field; Attendance: 7,403; Referee: Ismir Pekmic

August 31 25	LA Galaxy II	1–0	Sacramento Republic FC	Carson, California
19:00	Koreniuk 21'; Kamara (yellow card) 39'; Cuello (yellow card) 54'; Fiddes (yellow card) 56'; Lopez (yellow card) 90+1'	Report	Enevoldsen (yellow card) 20'; Partain (yellow card) 64'; McCrary (yellow card) 82'	Stadium: Dignity Health Sports Park; Attendance: 783; Referee: Michael Radchuk

September 7 26	Sacramento Republic FC	3–0	Tacoma Defiance	Sacramento, California
7:30 pm (PDT)	Skundrich (yellow card) 11'; Enevoldsen 13', 75'; Taintor (yellow card) 18'; Iwasa 45+2'	Report	Vargas (yellow card) 33'; Hegardt (yellow card) 90+4'	Stadium: Papa Murphy's Park; Attendance: 10,218; Referee: Luis Guardia

September 11 27	Austin Bold FC	1–2	Sacramento Republic FC	Austin, Texas
5:30 PM	Guadarrama (yellow card) 21'; Kléber 33'; Okugo (yellow card) 65'	Report	Enevoldsen 23', (yellow card) 90+6'; Skundrich (yellow card) 26'; Formella 31'; Shuttleworth (yellow card) 75'; Bijev (yellow card) 87'	Stadium: Austin Bold Stadium; Attendance: 1,201; Referee: Jon Freemon

September 15 28	Sacramento Republic FC	2–1	Rio Grande Valley FC Toros	Sacramento, California
7:00 PM	Werner 18'; Formella 81', (yellow card) 83'; Shuttleworth (yellow card) 90+2'	Report	Lemoine 5'; Castellanos (yellow card) 68'; Bird (yellow card) 83'	Stadium: Papa Murphy's Park; Attendance: 10,688; Referee: Joseph Salinas

September 22 29	OKC Energy FC	0–0	Sacramento Republic FC	Oklahoma City, Oklahoma
4:00 PM	Williams (yellow card) 43'	Report	Saari (yellow card) 89'	Stadium: Taft Stadium; Attendance: 5,169; Referee: Lukasz Szpala

September 28 30	Sacramento Republic FC	1–2	El Paso Locomotive FC	Sacramento, California
7:30 PM	Enevoldsen 14'; Skundrich (yellow card) 84'; Chantzopoulos (yellow card) 87'	Report	Fox (yellow card) 29'; Rebellón 48'; Monsalvez (yellow card) 57'; Gómez 90+1'	Stadium: Papa Murphy's Park; Attendance: 10,807; Referee: Rosendo Mendoza

October 2 31	Sacramento Republic FC	2–2	LA Galaxy II	Sacramento, California
19:30	Enevoldsen 20', (yellow card) 90+1'; Mahoney 89'; Taintor (red card) 90+5'	Report	Fiddes (yellow card) 8'; Shultz (yellow card) 32'; Zubak 37'; Kamara 72'; Williams (yellow card) 77' (yellow-red card) 90+5'	Stadium: Papa Murphy's Park; Attendance: 9,324; Referee: Elton García

October 5 32	Tulsa Roughnecks FC	2–3	Sacramento Republic FC	Tulsa, Oklahoma
7:00 p.m. CDT	Marlon 31'; Silva 40'; Roberts (yellow card) 45'	Report	Bijev 13'; Enevoldsen 19'; Werner (yellow card) 42'; Iwasa 59'	Stadium: Oneok Field; Attendance: 2,257; Referee: Alejandro Mariscal

October 12 33	Sacramento Republic FC	2–3	Orange County SC	Sacramento, California
19:30	Iwasa 6', 64'; McCrary (yellow card) 17'; Skundrich (yellow card) 90+1'; Taintor (yellow card) 90+5'	Report	Jones 16'; Alston (yellow card) 20'; Vinicius 26', (yellow card) 56'; Forrester (yellow card) 43'; Orozco 78'; Due (yellow card) 90+5'; Quinn (yellow card) 90+5'	Stadium: Papa Murphy's Park; Attendance: 11,569; Referee: Mark Allatin

October 19 34	Real Monarchs	3–0	Sacramento Republic FC	Herriman, Utah
8:00 PM	Ryden 45'; Mulholland (yellow card) 48', (goal) 50'; Blake (yellow card) 56'; Martínez 61', (yellow card) 82'	Report	Villarreal (yellow card) 24'; Taintor (yellow card) 43'; McCrary (yellow card) 85'	Stadium: Zions Bank Stadium; Attendance: 2,131; Referee: Elvis Osmanovic

==== USL Cup Playoffs ====
October 23 Play-In Round	Sacramento Republic FC	2–1	New Mexico United	Sacramento, California
7:30 PM	Enevoldsen (yellow card) 44', (goal) 82'; Alemán 45+3'; Villarreal (yellow card) 67'; Werner (yellow card) 90+3'	Report	Sandoval 1'; Padilla (yellow card) 44'; Wehan (yellow card) 64'; Guzmán (yellow card) 69'; Schmidt (yellow card) 90'	Stadium: Papa Murphy's Park; Attendance: 9,907; Referee: Elton Garcia

October 26 Conference Quarterfinals	Reno 1868 FC	1–3	Sacramento Republic FC	Reno, Nevada
7:30 PM	Hertzog 5'	Report	Werner 8'; Iwasa 70'; Taintor (yellow card) 73'; Enevoldsen 75'; Skundrich (yellow card) 84'	Stadium: Greater Nevada Field; Attendance: 3,275; Referee: Malik Badawi

November 2 Conference Semifinals	El Paso Locomotive FC	3–0	Sacramento Republic FC	El Paso, Texas
6:30 PM	Beckie (yellow card) 25'; Gómez 40'; Ryan (yellow card) 70'; Contreras 83' (pen.); Yuma (yellow card) 86'; Velásquez 88'	Report	Alemán (yellow card) 51'; Enevoldsen (yellow card) 70'; Barahona (yellow card) 87'	Stadium: Southwest University Park; Attendance: 7,460; Referee: Farhad Dadkho

=== U.S. Open Cup ===
As a member of the USL Championship, Sacramento entered the tournament in the Second Round, with the pairing announced on April 17.

May 15 Second Round	Sacramento Republic FC (California)	1–0	(Nevada) Reno 1868 FC	Sacramento, California
7:30 PM	Taintor (yellow card) 29'; Werner (yellow card) 51', (goal) 82'; Villarreal (yellow card) 74'; Bonomo (yellow card) 90+2'	Report	Aune (yellow card) 86'	Stadium: Papa Murphy's Park; Attendance: 400; Referee: Turan Özdemir

May 29 Third Round	Sacramento Republic FC (California)	1–0 (a.e.t.)	(California) Fresno FC	Sacramento, California
7:30 pm PDT	Chantzopoulos (yellow card) 18'; Saari (yellow card) 31'; Bonomo 120+3'	Report	Strong (yellow card) 85'; Basuljevic (yellow card) 102'; Martin (yellow card) 107'	Stadium: Papa Murphy's Park; Attendance: 1,618; Referee: Farhad Dadkho

June 11 Fourth Round	San Jose Earthquakes (California)	4–3	(California) Sacramento Republic FC	San Jose, California
19:30 PST	Eriksson 10'; Calvillo (yellow card) 18'; Espinoza 38' (pen.); Qazaishvili 78', 90+1'	Report	Werner 2'; Bijev 14'; Mahoney (yellow card) 45'; Chantzopoulos (yellow card) 52'; Skundrich 90+3'	Stadium: Avaya Stadium; Attendance: 7,543; Referee: Mark Allatin
