= 2019 U.S. Open Cup =

106th edition of cup competition in American soccer

2019 Lamar Hunt U.S. Open Cup
Tournament details
- Country: United States
- Teams: 84

Final positions
- Champions: Atlanta United FC (1st title)
- Runners-up: Minnesota United FC
- 2020 CONCACAF Champions League: Atlanta United FC
- 2021 CONCACAF Champions League: Atlanta United FC

Tournament statistics
- Matches played: 83
- Goals scored: 278 (3.35 per match)
- Top goal scorer: Darwin Quintero (6 goals)

The 2019 Lamar Hunt U.S. Open Cup was the 106th edition of the U.S. Open Cup, a knockout cup competition in American soccer. It is the oldest ongoing competition in the United States, and was contested by 84 teams from leagues in the U.S. system.

The 84 entrants included the 21 American clubs from Major League Soccer and 25 non-affiliated American clubs in the USL Championship. The new USL League One entered its six non-affiliated clubs. The qualification tournament, held in 2018 and early 2019, determined seven teams from local amateur leagues. The 10 entrants from the USL League Two and the 14 from the National Premier Soccer League were determined based on results achieved in those leagues in 2018. Finally, beginning this year, the reigning champion of the National Amateur Cup, Milwaukee Bavarian SC, was invited to the tournament.

Houston Dynamo were the defending champions but were eliminated in the round of 16 by Minnesota United FC.

Atlanta United FC won their first Open Cup title, defeating Minnesota United FC 2–1 in the final.

== Qualification ==
**Enter in First round**				**Enter in Second round**	**Enter in Fourth round**
**Open Division**			**Division III**	**Division II**	**Division I**
**USCS/USASA/USSSA/ANFEEU**; 8 teams	**NPSL**; 14 teams	**USL League Two**; 10 teams	**USL League One**; 6 teams	**USL Championship**; 25 teams	**MLS**; 21 teams
Academica SC; Cal FC; FC Denver; Florida Soccer Soldiers; Milwaukee Bavarian SC (2018 NAC champion); NTX Rayados; Virginia United FC; West Chester United SC	AFC Ann Arbor; Duluth FC; El Farolito; Erie Commodores FC; FC Baltimore; FC Motown; FC Mulhouse Portland; Laredo Heat; Little Rock Rangers; Miami FC; Midland-Odessa Sockers FC; New York Cosmos B; Orange County FC^{$}; Philadelphia Lone Star FC	Black Rock FC; Brazos Valley Cavalry FC; Dayton Dutch Lions; Des Moines Menace; FC Golden State Force; Lakeland Tropics; New York Red Bulls U-23; Reading United AC; South Georgia Tormenta FC 2; The Villages SC	Chattanooga Red Wolves SC; Forward Madison FC^{$}; Greenville Triumph SC; Lansing Ignite FC; Richmond Kickers; South Georgia Tormenta FC	Austin Bold FC; Birmingham Legion FC; Charleston Battery; Charlotte Independence; Colorado Springs Switchbacks FC; El Paso Locomotive FC; Fresno FC; Hartford Athletic; Indy Eleven; Las Vegas Lights FC; Louisville City FC; Memphis 901 FC; Nashville SC; New Mexico United; North Carolina FC; Oklahoma City Energy FC; Orange County SC; Phoenix Rising FC; Pittsburgh Riverhounds SC; Reno 1868 FC; Sacramento Republic FC; Saint Louis FC^{$}; San Antonio FC; Tampa Bay Rowdies; Tulsa Roughnecks FC	Atlanta United FC^{$$$}; Chicago Fire; Colorado Rapids; Columbus Crew SC; D.C. United; FC Cincinnati; FC Dallas; Houston Dynamo; LA Galaxy; Los Angeles FC; Minnesota United FC^{$$}; New England Revolution; New York City FC; New York Red Bulls; Orlando City SC; Philadelphia Union; Portland Timbers; Real Salt Lake; San Jose Earthquakes; Seattle Sounders FC; Sporting Kansas City

- Bold: Team still active in the competition.
- $: Winner of $25,000 bonus for advancing the furthest in the competition from their respective divisions.
- $$: Winner of $100,000 for being the runner-up in the competition.
- $$$: Winner of $300,000 for winning the competition.

== Number of teams by state ==
A total of 34 states and the District of Columbia are represented by clubs in the Open Cup this year.

	States	Number	Teams
1	California	11	Academica SC, Cal FC, El Farolito, FC Golden State Force, Fresno FC, LA Galaxy, Los Angeles FC, Orange County FC, Orange County SC, Sacramento Republic FC, San Jose Earthquakes
2	Texas	9	Austin Bold FC, Brazos Valley Cavalry FC, El Paso Locomotive FC, FC Dallas, Laredo Heat, Midland-Odessa Sockers FC, NTX Rayados, San Antonio FC, Houston Dynamo
3	Florida	6	Florida Soccer Soldiers, Lakeland Tropics, Miami FC, Orlando City SC, Tampa Bay Rowdies, The Villages SC
3	Pennsylvania	6	Erie Commodores FC, Philadelphia Lone Star FC, Philadelphia Union, Pittsburgh Riverhounds SC, Reading United AC, West Chester United SC
5	Colorado	3	Colorado Rapids, Colorado Springs Switchbacks FC, FC Denver
5	Georgia	3	Atlanta United FC, South Georgia Tormenta FC, South Georgia Tormenta FC 2
5	New Jersey	3	FC Motown, New York Red Bulls, New York Red Bulls U-23
5	Ohio	3	Columbus Crew SC, Dayton Dutch Lions, FC Cincinnati
5	Tennessee	3	Chattanooga Red Wolves SC, Memphis 901 FC, Nashville SC
10	Massachusetts	2	Black Rock FC, New England Revolution
10	Michigan	2	AFC Ann Arbor, Lansing Ignite FC
10	Minnesota	2	Duluth FC, Minnesota United FC
10	Nevada	2	Las Vegas Lights FC, Reno 1868 FC
10	New York	2	New York City FC, New York Cosmos B
10	North Carolina	2	Charlotte Independence, North Carolina FC
10	Oklahoma	2	Oklahoma City Energy FC, Tulsa Roughnecks FC
10	Oregon	2	FC Mulhouse Portland, Portland Timbers
10	South Carolina	2	Charleston Battery, Greenville Triumph SC
10	Virginia	2	Richmond Kickers, Virginia United FC
10	Wisconsin	2	Forward Madison FC, Milwaukee Bavarian SC
21	Alabama	1	Birmingham Legion FC
21	Arizona	1	Phoenix Rising FC
21	Arkansas	1	Little Rock Rangers
21	Connecticut	1	Hartford Athletic
21	District of Columbia	1	D.C. United
21	Illinois	1	Chicago Fire
21	Indiana	1	Indy Eleven
21	Iowa	1	Des Moines Menace
21	Kansas	1	Sporting Kansas City
21	Kentucky	1	Louisville City FC
21	Maryland	1	FC Baltimore
21	Missouri	1	Saint Louis FC
21	New Mexico	1	New Mexico United
21	Utah	1	Real Salt Lake
21	Washington	1	Seattle Sounders FC

States without a team in the Open Cup: Alaska, Delaware, Hawaii, Idaho, Louisiana, Maine, Mississippi, Montana, Nebraska, New Hampshire, North Dakota, Rhode Island, South Dakota, Vermont, West Virginia, and Wyoming.

== Brackets ==
First round May 7–8
NPSL	Little Rock Rangers	2(2)
**LQ**	**NTX Rayados**	**2(4)**
USL2	Lakeland Tropics	1(7)
**USL2**	**The Villages SC**	**1(8)**
**USL1**	**Richmond Kickers**	**6**
LQ	Virginia United FC	2
NPSL	Miami FC	1
**LQ**	**Florida Soccer Soldiers**	**2**
NPSL	Erie Commodores FC	1
**USL2**	**Dayton Dutch Lions**	**2**
**USL1**	**Lansing Ignite FC**	**2**
NPSL	AFC Ann Arbor	1
**USL2**	**Reading United AC**	**2**
NPSL	Philadelphia Lone Star FC	1
NPSL	FC Baltimore Christos	1(4)
**LQ**	**West Chester United SC**	**1(5)**
**USL2**	**Des Moines Menace**	**1(3)**
NPSL	Duluth FC	1(1)
LQ	Milwaukee Bavarian SC	0
**USL1**	**Forward Madison FC**	**2**
**USL2**	**New York Red Bulls U-23**	**4(5)**
NPSL	FC Motown	4(3)
**NPSL**	**New York Cosmos B**	**2**
USL2	Black Rock FC	1
**USL2**	**South Georgia Tormenta FC 2**	**3**
USL1	Chattanooga Red Wolves SC	0
**USL1**	**Greenville Triumph SC**	**1**
USL1	South Georgia Tormenta FC	0
**NPSL**	**Laredo Heat SC**	**1**
USL2	Brazos Valley Cavalry FC	0
NPSL	Midland-Odessa Sockers FC	1
**LQ**	**FC Denver**	**2**
LQ	Academica SC	1
**NPSL**	**El Farolito**	**2**
**LQ**	**Cal FC**	**5**
NPSL	FC Mulhouse Portland	1
**NPSL**	**Orange County FC**	**2**
USL2	FC Golden State Force	0

Second round May 14–15
**USLC**	**OKC Energy FC**	**3**
LQ	NTX Rayados	1
**USLC**	**Tampa Bay Rowdies**	**4**
USL2	The Villages SC	1
**USLC**	**North Carolina FC**	**4**
USL1	Richmond Kickers	1
USLC	Charlotte Independence	2(4)
**LQ**	**Florida Soccer Soldiers**	**2(5)**
**USLC**	**Pittsburgh Riverhounds SC**	**3**
USL2	Dayton Dutch Lions	0
**USLC**	**Indy Eleven**	**1**
USL1	Lansing Ignite FC	0
**USLC**	**Louisville City FC**	**3**
USL2	Reading United AC	0
**USLC**	**Birmingham Legion FC**	**4**
LQ	West Chester United SC	1
USL2	Des Moines Menace	1(1)
**USLC**	**Saint Louis FC**	**1(3)**
USLC	El Paso Locomotive FC	0
**USL1**	**Forward Madison FC**	**3**
**USLC**	**Memphis 901 FC**	**3**
USL2	New York Red Bulls U-23	1
**USLC**	**Hartford Athletic**	**2**
NPSL	New York Cosmos B	1
**USLC**	**Nashville SC**	**3**
USL2	South Georgia Tormenta FC 2	2
USL1	Greenville Triumph SC	1
**USLC**	**Charleston Battery**	**2**
**USLC**	**Austin Bold FC**	**2**
USLC	Tulsa Roughnecks FC	0
**USLC**	**San Antonio FC**	**2**
NPSL	Laredo Heat	0
**USLC**	**Colorado Springs Switchbacks FC**	**1**
LQ	FC Denver	0
USLC	Phoenix Rising FC	2(3)
**USLC**	**New Mexico United**	**2(4)**
**USLC**	**Sacramento Republic FC**	**1**
USLC	Reno 1868 FC	0
NPSL	El Farolito	0
**USLC**	**Fresno FC**	**1**
**USLC**	**Las Vegas Lights FC**	**2**
LQ	Cal FC	0
USLC	Orange County SC	2(3)
**NPSL**	**Orange County FC**	**2(5)**

Third round May 28–29
**USLC**	**OKC Energy FC**	**4**
USLC	Tampa Bay Rowdies	3
**USLC**	**North Carolina FC**	**1**
LQ	Florida Soccer Soldiers	0
**USLC**	**Pittsburgh Riverhounds SC**	**1**
USLC	Indy Eleven	0
**USLC**	**Louisville City FC**	**1**
USLC	Birmingham Legion FC	0
**USLC**	**Saint Louis FC**	**3**
USL1	Forward Madison FC	1
**USLC**	**Memphis 901 FC**	**4**
USLC	Hartford Athletic	0
USLC	Nashville SC	1(0)
**USLC**	**Charleston Battery**	**1(3)**
**USLC**	**Austin Bold FC**	**4**
USLC	San Antonio FC	2
USLC	Colorado Springs Switchbacks FC	1
**USLC**	**New Mexico United**	**2***
**USLC**	**Sacramento Republic FC**	**1***
USLC	Fresno FC	0
USLC	Las Vegas Lights FC	3
**NPSL**	**Orange County FC**	**5**

Host team listed first
Bold = winner
* = after extra time, ( ) = penalty shootout score

Fourth round June 11–12
USLC	Memphis 901 FC	1
**MLS**	**Orlando City SC**	**3**
MLS	New York Red Bulls	2
**MLS**	**New England Revolution**	**3***
**MLS**	**D.C. United**	**2***
MLS	Philadelphia Union	1
**MLS**	**New York City FC**	**4**
USLC	North Carolina FC	0
**MLS**	**Columbus Crew SC**	**1**
USLC	Pittsburgh Riverhounds	0
USLC	Charleston Battery	1
**MLS**	**Atlanta United FC**	**3***
**USLC**	**Saint Louis FC**	**2**
MLS	Chicago Fire	1
**MLS**	**FC Cincinnati**	**2***
USLC	Louisville City FC	1
**MLS**	**Houston Dynamo**	**3**
USLC	Austin Bold FC	2
**MLS**	**Minnesota United FC**	**4**
MLS	Sporting Kansas City	1
**MLS**	**FC Dallas**	**4**
USLC	OKC Energy FC	0
MLS	Colorado Rapids	2(2)
**USLC**	**New Mexico United**	**2(4)**
MLS	Real Salt Lake	0
**MLS**	**Los Angeles FC**	**3**
**MLS**	**San Jose Earthquakes**	**4**
USLC	Sacramento Republic FC	3
MLS	Seattle Sounders FC	1
**MLS**	**Portland Timbers**	**2**
**MLS**	**LA Galaxy**	**3**
NPSL	Orange County FC	0

Round of 16; June 18–20
**MLS**	**Orlando City SC**	**2***
MLS	New England Revolution	1
MLS	D.C. United	1
**MLS**	**New York City FC**	**2**
MLS	Columbus Crew SC	2
**MLS**	**Atlanta United FC**	**3**
**USLC**	**Saint Louis FC**	**1**
MLS	FC Cincinnati	0
MLS	Houston Dynamo	2
**MLS**	**Minnesota United FC**	**3**
MLS	FC Dallas	1
**USLC**	**New Mexico United**	**2**
**MLS**	**Los Angeles FC**	**3**
MLS	San Jose Earthquakes	1
**MLS**	**Portland Timbers**	**4**
MLS	LA Galaxy	0

Quarterfinals; July 10
**MLS**	**Orlando City SC**	**1(5)**
MLS	New York City FC	1(4)
**MLS**	**Atlanta United FC**	**2**
USLC	Saint Louis FC	0
**MLS**	**Minnesota United FC**	**6**
USLC	New Mexico United	1
MLS	Los Angeles FC	0
**MLS**	**Portland Timbers**	**1**

Semifinals; August 7
MLS	Orlando City SC	0
**MLS**	**Atlanta United FC**	**2**
**MLS**	**Minnesota United FC**	**2**
MLS	Portland Timbers	1

Final; August 27
**MLS**	**Atlanta United FC**	**2**
MLS	Minnesota United FC	1

- Host team listed first
- **Bold** = winner
- * = after extra time, ( ) = penalty shootout score

== Match details ==
All times local to game site.

=== First round ===
The First round of the Open Cup took place on May 7 and 8. There were 19 games between eight local qualifiers, 14 NPSL, 10 USL League Two, and 6 USL League One teams. The teams were paired geographically. The pairings were announced on April 10.

May 7	Richmond Kickers (USL1)	6–2	Virginia United FC (LQ)	Richmond, Virginia
7:00 pm EDT	Boateng 17', 23', 55', 75'; Jackson (yellow card) 37', (goal) 48'; Lockaby 43'; Grove (yellow card) 49'	Report	Gibbons (yellow card) 9'; Martinez 28'; Majano 90+2'	Stadium: City Stadium; Attendance: 727; Referee: Nicholas Barbera

May 7	Lakeland Tropics (USL2)	1–1 (a.e.t.) (7–8 p)	The Villages SC (USL2)	Auburndale, Florida
7:00 pm EDT	Taylor-Parkes 37'; Toure (yellow card) 41'; Parreiras (yellow card) 69'	Report	Seglio 16'; Dudic (yellow card) 45+1'; Lopes (yellow card) 119'	Stadium: Lake Myrtle Sports Complex; Attendance: 2,076; Referee: Alex Billeter
	Penalties
	Van Der Luit (penalty scored); Lindqvist (penalty scored); Lynch (penalty scored); Bouzoukis (penalty missed); Lorrente (penalty missed); Wiechers (penalty scored); Toure (penalty scored); Hovious (penalty scored); B. Espinal (penalty scored); Kimura (penalty missed)		(penalty scored) Lopes; (penalty missed) De Freitas; (penalty scored) Pampolin; (penalty scored) Fawole; (penalty missed) Jerfesson; (penalty scored) Butler; (penalty scored) Brody; (penalty scored) Da Costa; (penalty scored) Gyau; (penalty scored) Dudic

May 7	New York Red Bulls U-23 (USL2)	4–4 (a.e.t.) (5–3 p)	FC Motown (NPSL)	Montclair, New Jersey
7:00 pm EDT	Marin 18'; Saramago 25', (yellow card) 101'; Murphy (yellow card) 39'; Sowe 59'; Cedeno 110'; Esposito (yellow card) 120+1'	Report	Fala 3'; Eze 70'; Vickers 71', (yellow card) 95'; Garcia (yellow card) 108', (goal) 119'	Stadium: MSU Soccer Park at Pittser Field; Attendance: 302; Referee: Luis Arroyo Cabrera
	Penalties
	Murphy (penalty scored); Cedeno (penalty scored); Sowe (penalty scored); Uche (penalty scored); Esposito (penalty scored)		(penalty scored) Allen; (penalty scored) De Sousa; (penalty scored) Nigro; (penalty missed) Hackett

May 7	FC Baltimore Christos (NPSL)	1–1 (a.e.t.) (4–5 p)	West Chester United SC (LQ)	Baltimore, Maryland
7:00 pm EDT	Dengler 56'	Report	Amspacher 2'; O'Neill (yellow card) 82'	Stadium: Homewood Field; Attendance: 400; Referee: Sergio Gonzalez
	Penalties
	Gielen (penalty scored); Mason (penalty scored); Brown (penalty missed); Dengler (penalty scored); Gumbs (penalty scored); Richardson (penalty missed); Pulliam (penalty missed)		(penalty scored) Gonzalez; (penalty scored) Bollinger; (penalty missed) Kades; (penalty scored) Hoops; (penalty scored) Nolan; (penalty missed) Wilson; (penalty scored) Phelps

May 7	South Georgia Tormenta FC 2 (USL2)	3–0	Chattanooga Red Wolves SC (USL1)	Statesboro, Georgia
7:00 pm EDT	Wigfall 25'; McCall (yellow card) 43'; Mayr-Fälten 58'; Billhardt 74'; Richards (yellow card) 82'	Report	Kendall-Moullin (yellow card) 6'; Pineda (yellow card) 40'	Stadium: Erk Russell Park; Attendance: 544; Referee: Aleksandar Zhelyazkov

May 7	Milwaukee Bavarian SC (LQ)	0–2	Forward Madison FC (USL1)	Milwaukee, Wisconsin
7:30 pm CDT	Lorenz (yellow card) 46'; Zamani (yellow card) 55'	Report	Eaton 9'; Barriga Toyama 36' (Smart); Ng'anzi (yellow card) 77'	Stadium: Uihlein Soccer Park; Attendance: 400; Referee: Peter Bernardy

May 7	Laredo Heat SC (NPSL)	1–0	Brazos Valley Cavalry FC (USL2)	Laredo, Texas
8:15 pm CDT	Sakou 60' (pen.); Hincapie (yellow card) 64' (yellow-red card) 76'	Report	Goodrum (yellow card) 51'; Leon (yellow card) 58' (yellow-red card) 66'; Ortiz (yellow card) 64'	Stadium: Texas A&M International University Soccer Complex; Attendance: 589; Referee: Julio Mendoza

May 7	Academica SC (LQ)	1–2	El Farolito (NPSL)	Turlock, California
7:30 pm PDT	Chaidez (yellow card) 17'; Carmoa 72'; Torralva (yellow card) 78'	Report	Garduño 21' (Cardona); Fredes (yellow card) 26', (goal) 35' (Montes); Mazzolatti (yellow card) 37' (yellow-red card) 54'; Viegas (yellow card) 90+4'	Stadium: Academica Field; Attendance: 450; Referee: Turan Özdemir

May 7	Cal FC (LQ)	5–1	FC Mulhouse Portland (NPSL)	Irvine, California
7:30 pm PDT	Barouch 15' (pen.), 25' (Alfaro), 45' (Alewine); Alfaro 28' (Barrera); Menjivar 52', (yellow card) 72'	Report	Lins (yellow card) 38'; Braun 44' (McKenna); Selland (yellow card) 50'; White (yellow card) 59'; Sanchez (yellow card) 70'	Stadium: Orange County Great Park, Field 25; Attendance: 50; Referee: Samantha Martinez

May 7	Orange County FC (NPSL)	2–0	FC Golden State Force (USL2)	Irvine, California
7:30 pm PDT	Shelton 28', (yellow card) 82'; Collins (yellow card) 45+3'; Lombardi 68'; Bryant (yellow card) 90+2'	Report	Ruiz (yellow card) 45+1'; Salazar (yellow card) 68'	Stadium: Championship Soccer Stadium; Attendance: 700; Referee: Reyna Fonseca

May 8	Erie Commodores FC (NPSL)	1–2	Dayton Dutch Lions (USL2)	Erie, Pennsylvania
7:00 pm EDT	Strolley 56'; Bennett (yellow card) 61'; Dziadosz (yellow card) 80'	Report	Quinn 12' (o.g.); Charkoutsakis (yellow card) 59'; Keir 73'; Barrios (yellow card) 81'	Stadium: McConnell Family Stadium; Attendance: 301; Referee: Rabee Naji

May 8	Reading United AC (USL2)	2–1	Philadelphia Lone Star FC (NPSL)	Reading, Pennsylvania
7:00 pm EDT	Rafanello 18', 21' (pen.); Waso (yellow card) 50'; Hanger (yellow card) 74'	Report	Fane (yellow card) 26' (yellow-red card) 86'; Allison (yellow card) 52'; Genus 69'	Stadium: Alvernia University Stadium; Attendance: 230; Referee: Joshua Encarnación

May 8	Greenville Triumph SC (USL1)	1–0	South Georgia Tormenta FC (USL1)	Greenville, South Carolina
7:00 pm EDT	Boland (yellow card) 50'; Seiler 75'	Report	Rowe (yellow card) 38'; Phelps (yellow card) 40'; Micaletto (yellow card) 85'	Stadium: Legacy Early College Field; Attendance: 1,757; Referee: Wilmer Soriano

May 8	Miami FC (NPSL)	1–2	Florida Soccer Soldiers (LQ)	Miami Shores, Florida
7:00 pm EDT	Martínez 6'; Franco (yellow card) 53'; Pais (yellow card) 68'; Chapman-Page (yellow card) 86'	Report	Stamatis 46'; Gonzalez (yellow card) 73'; Meneses 87'	Stadium: Buccaneer Field; Attendance: 817; Referee: Jamie Willis

May 8	New York Cosmos B (NPSL)	2–1	Black Rock FC (USL2)	Manhattan, New York
7:30 pm EDT	Venegas (yellow card) 8'; Dennis 28'; Bardic 90+6', (yellow card) 90+6'	Report	Martìnez-Paiz 87'	Stadium: Rocco B. Commisso Soccer Stadium; Attendance: 463; Referee: Ernie Constantine

May 8	Little Rock Rangers (NPSL)	2–2 (a.e.t.) (2–4 p)	NTX Rayados (LQ)	Little Rock, Arkansas
7:00 pm CDT	Guadron 27'; Hlongwane 40' Reed (yellow card) 69'; Dent (yellow card) 85'; Blair (yellow card) 107'	Report	Wilson 8'; Ellis (yellow card) 44'; Sach (yellow card) 63'; Jones (yellow card) 85'; Vargas (red card) 88'; Fazio 90+5'; Martínez (yellow card) 120+1'	Stadium: Episcopal Collegiate School; Attendance: 400; Referee: Bryan Lemus
	Penalties
	Reed (penalty missed); Tucker (penalty scored); Hoth (penalty scored); Dent (penalty missed)		(penalty scored) Okeke; (penalty scored) Martínez; (penalty scored) Jones; (penalty scored) Fazio

May 8	Des Moines Menace (USL2)	1–1 (a.e.t.) (3–1 p)	Duluth FC (NPSL)	Urbandale, Iowa
7:30 pm CDT	Goya 9'; Bartman (yellow card) 63'; Bakayoko (yellow card) 107'; Bell (yellow card) 124'	Report	Carlyle 35' (pen.); Proctor (yellow card) 55'; Barberio (yellow card) 67'; Hill (yellow card) 115'	Stadium: Lions Field; Attendance: 200; Referee: Royce Van Roekel
	Penalties
	Robinson (penalty scored); O'Keeffe (penalty scored); Weber (penalty scored)		(penalty scored) Jacobs; (penalty missed) Diaz; (penalty missed) Fortune; (penalty missed) Hill

May 8	Midland-Odessa Sockers FC (NPSL)	1–2	FC Denver (LQ)	Midland, Texas
7:30 pm CDT	Mobley 64'	Report	Castillo 34'; Chauncey (yellow card) 47'; Crouse 89'	Stadium: Grande Communications Stadium; Attendance: 100; Referee: Brandon Gardner

May 8	Lansing Ignite FC (USL1)	2–1	AFC Ann Arbor (NPSL)	Lansing, Michigan
9:30 pm EDT	N'For 29', 72'	Report	Alexis (yellow card) 40', (goal) 66'	Stadium: Lansing Catholic High School; Attendance: 100; Referee: Nicole Green
Note: Kickoff time and venue changed from 7:00pm at Cooley Law School Stadium due to inclement field conditions.

=== Second round ===
The Second round was played on May 14 and 15. 22 games were played between the 19 Round 1 winners and 25 USL Championship teams. Each Round 1 pairing was matched to a Championship team, and the six remaining Championship teams were paired against each other. Pairings were made geographically, and announced on April 17.

May 14	Charlotte Independence (USLC)	2–2 (a.e.t.) (4–5 p)	Florida Soccer Soldiers (LQ)	Matthews, North Carolina
7:00 pm EDT	Roberts (yellow card) 9', (goal) 31' (Ndam); Johnson (yellow card) 34'; Maund (yellow card) 53'; Maria (yellow card) 68'; Oduro 92'	Report	Hoyos (yellow card) 24'; Sabella (yellow card) 27', (goal) 119'; González (yellow card) 33' (yellow-red card) 90+2'; Williams 78' (Meneses); Ruiz De Somocurcio (yellow card) 97'; Guanipa (yellow card) 117'	Stadium: Sportsplex at Matthews; Attendance: 500; Referee: Kevin Broadley
	Penalties
	Herrera (penalty scored); Taku (penalty scored); Gutman (penalty scored); Oduro (penalty scored); E. Martínez (penalty missed)		(penalty scored) Gammiero; (penalty scored) Serrano; (penalty scored) Williams; (penalty scored) Meneses; (penalty scored) Sabella

May 14	Pittsburgh Riverhounds SC (USLC)	3–0	Dayton Dutch Lions (USL2)	Pittsburgh, Pennsylvania
7:00 pm EDT	Brett 57' (pen.), 69' (Velrade); Velrade 90+2' (Dover)	Report		Stadium: Highmark Stadium; Attendance: 523; Referee: Austin Saini

May 14	Tampa Bay Rowdies (USLC)	4–1	The Villages SC (USL2)	St. Petersburg, Florida
7:00 pm EDT	Kone 43' (Steinberger), (yellow card) 88'; Steinberger 45+3'; Allen 62' (Steinberger); Soronellas (yellow card) 83'; Taylor 90+3'	Report	Lopes (yellow card) 40'; Gyau 89'	Stadium: Al Lang Stadium; Attendance: 1,342; Referee: Matthew Miscannon

May 14	Hartford Athletic (USLC)	2–1	New York Cosmos B (NPSL)	Hartford, Connecticut
7:30 pm EDT	Swartz 16' (Gentile); Jørgensen 25'; Wojcik (yellow card) 34'; Gentile (yellow card) 74'	Report	Dennis (yellow card) 24'; Bardic 57' (Sembroni)	Stadium: Al-Marzook Field; Attendance: 400; Referee: Thomas Snyder

May 14	Nashville SC (USLC)	3–2	South Georgia Tormenta FC 2 (USL2)	Murfreesboro, Tennessee
7:30 pm CDT	Mensah 8' (Winn); Winn 32' (Akinyode); Lancaster 52' (Winn); Doyle (yellow card) 87'	Report	Billhardt 43'; Meehan 68' (Skelton)	Stadium: Dean A. Hayes Stadium; Attendance: 1,008; Referee: Leland Grant

May 14	OKC Energy FC (USLC)	3–1	NTX Rayados (LQ)	Norman, Oklahoma
7:30 pm CDT	Šašivarević 51' (Bosetti); Eissele 81' (pen.); Watson 90+4' (pen.)	Report	Okeke 62' (Rodriguez); Ramirez (yellow card) 90+3'	Stadium: John Crain Field; Attendance: 417; Referee: Michael Cap

May 14	Austin Bold FC (USLC)	2–0	Tulsa Roughnecks FC (USLC)	Del Valle, Texas
7:30 pm CDT	Báez (yellow card) 29'; Guadarrama 34' (McFarlane); André Lima 74' (McFarlane)	Report	Blackwell (yellow card) 33'; Makinde (yellow card) 69'	Stadium: Bold Stadium; Attendance: 1,266; Referee: Luis Guardia

May 14	San Antonio FC (USLC)	2–0	Laredo Heat (NPSL)	San Antonio, Texas
7:30 pm CDT	Eboussi 17' (Barmby); Guzmán 41' (Barmby)	Report	Rebolledo (yellow card) 30'; Rodriguez (yellow card) 48'; Samura (yellow card) 52'; Kimishima (yellow card) 85'	Stadium: Toyota Field; Attendance: 4,702; Referee: Elton Garcia

May 14	Las Vegas Lights FC (USLC)	2–0	Cal FC (LQ)	Las Vegas, Nevada
7:30 pm PDT	Ochoa 13' (Rivas), (yellow card) 60'; Torres (yellow card) 41'; Rojas 50' (Cruz); Sandoval (yellow card) 62'; Cruz (yellow card) 68'; Levin (red card) 90+2'	Report	Barrera (yellow card) 82'; Vásquez (yellow card) 87' (red card) 90+2'	Stadium: Cashman Field; Attendance: 2,536; Referee: Alejandro Aguilera

May 15	El Farolito (NPSL)	0–1	Fresno FC (USLC)	San Francisco, California
2:30 pm PDT	Garduño (yellow card) 12'; Cardona (yellow card) 58'; Haywood (yellow card) 87'	Report	Strong (yellow card) 10'; Lawal 75'	Stadium: Boxer Stadium; Attendance: 205; Referee: Nicholas Marin

May 15	Indy Eleven (USLC)	1–0	Lansing Ignite FC (USL1)	Indianapolis, Indiana
7:00 pm EDT	Newton (red card) 21'; Enevoldsen (yellow card) 51', (goal) 57' (Barrett); Watson (yellow card) 62'; Walker (yellow card) 88'; Kelly (yellow card) 90+2'	Report	Stoneman (yellow card) 62'	Stadium: Bud and Jackie Sellick Bowl; Attendance: 853; Referee: Adam Behrens

May 15	North Carolina FC (USLC)	4–1	Richmond Kickers (USL1)	Cary, North Carolina
7:00 pm EDT	Fortune 16' (Ewolo), (yellow card) 53'; McCabe (yellow card) 47'; Kristo 52' (Duvernay), 61' (pen.); Chester 70' (Perez); Wapiwo (yellow card) 82'	Report	Ackwei 34' (Gallardo), (yellow card) 61'	Stadium: Sahlen's Stadium at WakeMed Soccer Park; Attendance: 1,553; Referee: Joshua Escobar

May 15	Louisville City FC (USLC)	3–0	Reading United AC (USL2)	Louisville, Kentucky
7:00 pm EDT	Thiam 12' (McCabe); Totsch (yellow card) 13'; Davis 19'; Jane (yellow card) 36', (goal) 88'	Report		Stadium: Dr. Mark & Cindy Lynn Stadium; Attendance: 1,468; Referee: Brandon Artis

May 15	Greenville Triumph SC (USL1)	1–2	Charleston Battery (USLC)	Greenville, South Carolina
7:00 pm EDT	Clowes (yellow card) 19'; Hemmings 29' (Walker)	Report	van Schaik (yellow card) 4'; Svantesson 79', 90+1' (Nelson)	Stadium: Legacy Early College; Attendance: 1,738; Referee: David Erbacher

May 15	Memphis 901 FC (USLC)	3–1	New York Red Bulls U-23 (USL2)	Memphis, Tennessee
7:00 pm CDT	Lindley 8'; Morton 26' (Kunga), 73' (Lindley); Grandison (yellow card) 31'; Bennett II (yellow card) 90+4'	Report	Marin 5' (Saramago); Sharifi (yellow card) 49'; Uche (yellow card) 90+4'	Stadium: AutoZone Park; Attendance: 4,057; Referee: Carlos Pielago

May 15	Birmingham Legion FC (USLC)	4–1	West Chester United SC (LQ)	Birmingham, Alabama
7:00 pm CDT	Hoffman 22' (pen.); Hollinger-Janzen 38' (Opoku); Kasim 51' (Opoku); Opoku 89' (Johnson)	Report	Wilson 61'	Stadium: BBVA Compass Field; Attendance: 3,307; Referee: Sergii Demianchuk

May 15	Des Moines Menace (USL2)	1–1 (a.e.t.) (1–3 p)	Saint Louis FC (USLC)	Des Moines, Iowa
7:30 pm CDT	Perea 39' (pen.); Easterling (yellow card) 40' (yellow-red card) 90+2'; Chávez (yellow card) 53' (yellow-red card) 120+4'; Bakayoko (yellow card) 90+6'; Bell (yellow card) 126'	Report	Umar (yellow card) 7'; Greig 14' (Jepson), (yellow card) 40'; Cicerone (yellow card) 80'; Reynolds (yellow card) 90+6'; Dikwa (yellow card) 113' (yellow-red card) 114'	Stadium: Cownie Soccer Park; Attendance: 630; Referee: Esad Omanovic
	Penalties
	Coan (penalty missed); Volk (penalty scored); Perea (penalty missed); Bakayoko (penalty missed)		(penalty scored) Hilton; (penalty scored) Abend; (penalty scored) Cicerone

May 15	El Paso Locomotive FC (USLC)	0–3	Forward Madison FC (USL1)	El Paso, Texas
7:00 pm MDT	Navarro (yellow card) 23'; Kiffe (yellow card) 75'; Salgado (yellow card) 80'	Report	Barriga Toyama 19' (Paulo Jr.), (yellow card) 78'; Díaz 26' (Barriga Toyama); Michaud 76' (Paulo Jr.), (yellow card) 83'	Stadium: Southwest University Park; Attendance: 600; Referee: Marco Vega

May 15	Colorado Springs Switchbacks FC (USLC)	1–0	FC Denver (LQ)	Colorado Springs, Colorado
7:00 pm MDT	Donsu 45+1' (Schweitzer)	Report		Stadium: Weidner Field; Attendance: 300; Referee: Adam Zarrin

May 15	Phoenix Rising FC (USLC)	2–2 (a.e.t.) (3–4 p)	New Mexico United (USLC)	Tempe, Arizona
6:30 pm MST	Flemmings 65' (pen.); Musa (yellow card) 80'; Jahn 101' (Asante)	Report	Muhammad (yellow card) 28'; Frater (yellow card) 54'; Moar (yellow card) 90+3'; Sandoval 79' (Suggs), 95' (Moar)	Stadium: Casino Arizona Field; Attendance: 2,500; Referee: Dejan Susak
	Penalties
	Jahn (penalty scored); Asante (penalty scored); Dia (penalty missed); Spencer (penalty scored); Cochran (penalty missed)		(penalty scored) Wehan; (penalty scored) Moar; (penalty scored) Sandoval; (penalty missed) Suggs; (penalty scored) Schmidt

May 15	Sacramento Republic FC (USLC)	1–0	Reno 1868 FC (USLC)	Sacramento, California
7:30 pm PDT	Taintor (yellow card) 29'; Werner (yellow card) 51', (goal) 82' (Skundrich); Villarreal (yellow card) 74'; Bonomo (yellow card) 90+2'	Report	Aune (yellow card) 86'	Stadium: Papa Murphy's Park; Attendance: 400; Referee: Turan Özdemir

May 15	Orange County SC (USLC)	2–2 (a.e.t.) (3–5 p)	Orange County FC (NPSL)	Irvine, California
7:30 pm PDT	Davis 13' (o.g.); Jones 87' (Forrester)	Report	Collins 27'; Flores (yellow card) 84'; Davis (yellow card) 90'; Holland 90+2' (Lombardi)	Stadium: Championship Soccer Stadium; Attendance: 400; Referee: Samantha Martinez
	Penalties
	Quinn (penalty missed); Forrester (penalty scored); Ramos-Godoy (penalty scored); Trotter (penalty scored)		(penalty scored) Arreola; (penalty scored) Collins; (penalty scored) Ten Bosch; (penalty scored) Lombardi; (penalty scored) Shelton

=== Third round ===
The Third round was played on May 28 and 29. 11 games were played between the winners of Round 2. Pairings were made geographically, and announced on May 14.

May 28	OKC Energy FC (USLC)	4–3	Tampa Bay Rowdies (USLC)	Norman, Oklahoma
9:50 pm CDT	Gordon 2'; Boesetti 27', (yellow card) 30'; Eissele 32'; Brown 60'	Report	Allen 20' (pen.), 47'; Hoppenot 24'; Poku (yellow card) 34'	Stadium: John Crain Field; Attendance: 177; Referee: Elton Garcia

May 29	North Carolina FC (USLC)	1–0	Florida Soccer Soldiers (LQ)	Cary, North Carolina
7:00 pm EDT	Mehl (yellow card) 21'; Taylor 47'; Wapiwo (yellow card) 71'	Report	Sabella (yellow card) 45+5'; Olivares (yellow card) 90+3'; Meneses (red card) 90+4'	Stadium: Koka Booth (Field 2) at WakeMed Soccer Park; Attendance: 1,270; Referee: Gustavo Solorio

May 29	Pittsburgh Riverhounds SC (USLC)	1–0	Indy Eleven (USLC)	Pittsburgh, Pennsylvania
7:00 pm EDT	James (yellow card) 43'; Greenspan (yellow card) 74'; Forbes 85'	Report		Stadium: Highmark Stadium; Attendance: 444; Referee: Chris Ruska

May 29	Louisville City FC (USLC)	1–0	Birmingham Legion FC (USLC)	Louisville, Kentucky
7:00 pm EDT	Totsch 90' (pen.); Francis (yellow card) 90+5'	Report	Hollinger-Janzen (yellow card) 21'; Culbertson (yellow card) 82'; Van Oekel (yellow card) 89'	Stadium: Dr. Mark & Cindy Lynn Stadium; Attendance: 1,403; Referee: Kevin Fikar

May 29	Saint Louis FC (USLC)	3–1	Forward Madison FC (USL1)	Fenton, Missouri
7:00 pm CDT	Gee 2'; Abend 6'; Umar (yellow card) 51'; Bahner (yellow card) 56'; Cicerone 72'	Report	Smart 38'; Michaud (yellow card) 82'	Stadium: World Wide Technology Soccer Park; Attendance: 1,206; Referee: Ryan Cook

May 29	Memphis 901 FC (USLC)	4–0	Hartford Athletic (USLC)	Memphis, Tennessee
7:00 pm CDT	Burch 6' (pen.); Graf 21', 59'; Lindley (yellow card) 45'; Hackworth 83'	Report	Curinga (yellow card) 19' de Wit (yellow card) 39' (yellow-red card) 61'	Stadium: Mike Rose Soccer Complex; Attendance: 1,819; Referee: Leland Grant

May 29	Nashville SC (USLC)	1–1 (a.e.t.) (0–3 p)	Charleston Battery (USLC)	Murfreesboro, Tennessee
7:30 pm CDT	Jones (yellow card) 55'; Belmar 72'; Sparrow (yellow card) 96'; Davis (yellow card) 115'	Report	Daley 24' van Schaik (yellow card) 45+1'; Rittmeyer (yellow card) 106'	Stadium: Dean A. Hayes Stadium; Attendance: 769; Referee: Jared Simons
	Penalties
	Doyle (penalty missed); LaGrassa (penalty missed); Moloto (penalty missed)		Lewis (penalty scored); Archer (penalty scored) van Schaik (penalty missed); Svantesson (penalty scored)

May 29	Austin Bold FC (USLC)	4–2	San Antonio FC (USLC)	Del Valle, Texas
7:30 pm CDT	Kléber 10', (yellow card) 84'; Guadarrama 39'; Lima 43', 62'; Taylor (yellow card) 57'; Saramutin (yellow card) 71'	Report	Castillo (yellow card) 37'; Laing (yellow card) 41'; Restrepo 44'; Gallegos (yellow card) 60'; Barmby (yellow card) 90+3', (goal) 90+4'	Stadium: Bold Stadium; Attendance: 2,555; Referee: Marco Vega

May 29	Colorado Springs Switchbacks FC (USLC)	1–2 (a.e.t.)	New Mexico United (USLC)	Colorado Springs, Colorado
7:00 pm MDT	Burt 52'; Reaves (yellow card) 73'; Argueta (red card) 93'	Report	Frater (yellow card) 68', (goal) 95' (pen.); Wehan 87'	Stadium: Weidner Field; Attendance: 349; Referee: Karen Abt

May 29	Sacramento Republic FC (USLC)	1–0 (a.e.t.)	Fresno FC (USLC)	Sacramento, California
7:30 pm PDT	Chantzopoulos (yellow card) 18'; Saari (yellow card) 31'; Bonomo 120+3'	Report	Strong (yellow card) 85'; Basuljevic (yellow card) 102'; Martin (yellow card) 107'	Stadium: Papa Murphy's Park; Attendance: 1,618; Referee: Farhad Dadkho

May 29	Las Vegas Lights FC (USLC)	3–5	Orange County FC (NPSL)	Las Vegas, Nevada
7:30 pm PDT	Echavarría 23' (pen.); Sandoval (yellow card) 32', (goal) 85'; Rivas 47'; Torres (red card) 74'	Report	Shelton 6', (yellow card) 74'; Fehr 16' (o.g.); Holland (yellow card) 23'; Collins 35'; Lombardi (yellow card) 84'; Frischknecht 89'; Flores 90+1'	Stadium: Cashman Field; Attendance: 2,378; Referee: Samantha Martinez

=== Fourth round ===
The Fourth round took place on June 11 and 12. The Fourth Round consisted of 16 games between the 11 third round winners and the 21 American MLS teams. The teams were divided into eight regional groups of four, with either one or two third round teams. Pairings were drawn from the eight groups and announced on May 30.

June 11	Columbus Crew SC (MLS)	1–0	Pittsburgh Riverhounds (USLC)	Columbus, Ohio
7:00 pm EDT	Accam 55'	Report		Stadium: Mapfre Stadium; Attendance: 5,202; Referee: Matthew Franz

June 11	New York Red Bulls (MLS)	2–3 (a.e.t.)	New England Revolution (MLS)	Montclair, New Jersey
7:30 pm EDT	Barlow 19'; Cásseres 54'; Tarek (yellow card) 104'	Report	Agudelo 1'; L. Caicedo (yellow card) 41' (yellow-red card) 90+5'; Bunbury 85', 109'	Stadium: MSU Soccer Park; Attendance: 2,185; Referee: Rosendo Mendoza

June 11	Houston Dynamo (MLS)	3–2	Austin Bold FC (USLC)	Houston, Texas
7:00 pm CDT	Martínez 14'; Peña 31'; Vera 40'; Cabezas (yellow card) 65'; Duvall (yellow card) 70'; B. García (yellow card) 88'	Report	Guadarrama (yellow card) 42'; Báez 48', (yellow card) 51'; Saramutin (yellow card) 49'; Promise 58'; Taylor (yellow card) 86'	Stadium: BBVA Compass Stadium; Attendance: 4,765; Referee: Elton Garcia

June 11	Saint Louis FC (USLC)	2–1	Chicago Fire (MLS)	St. Charles, Missouri
7:30 pm CDT	Martz 17'; Abend 21'; Kamdem (yellow card) 71'	Report	Kappelhof (yellow card) 19'; Nikolić 72' (pen.)	Stadium: Harlen C. Hunter Stadium; Attendance: 4,456; Referee: Greg Dopka
Note: Venue was moved due to minor flooding at World Wide Technology Soccer Park in Fenton.

June 11	Real Salt Lake (MLS)	0–3	Los Angeles FC (MLS)	Sandy, Utah
8:00 pm MDT	Beckerman (yellow card) 19'; Toia (yellow card) 49'; Everton Luiz (yellow card) 55'	Report	Vela 8'; Nguyen 64'; Diomande 90+3'	Stadium: Rio Tinto Stadium; Attendance: 15,039; Referee: Victor Rivas

June 11	San Jose Earthquakes (MLS)	4–3	Sacramento Republic FC (USLC)	San Jose, California
7:30 pm PDT	Eriksson 10'; Calvillo (yellow card) 18'; Espinoza 38'; Qazaishvili 78', 90+1'	Report	Werner 2'; Bijev 14'; Mahoney (yellow card) 45'; Chantzopoulos (yellow card) 52'; Skundrich 90+3'	Stadium: Avaya Stadium; Attendance: 7,543; Referee: Mark Allatin

June 12	D.C. United (MLS)	2–1 (a.e.t.)	Philadelphia Union (MLS)	Washington, D.C.
7:00 pm EDT	Robinson (yellow card) 68'; Rodriguez (yellow card) 83'; McCann 118'; Rooney 120'	Report	Bedoya (yellow card) 95'; McKenzie (yellow card) 96'; Fontana 113'; Ilsinho (yellow card) 115'	Stadium: Audi Field; Attendance: 7,000; Referee: Marcos de Oliveira

June 12	New York City FC (MLS)	4–0	North Carolina FC (USLC)	New York, New York
7:00 pm EDT	Guillen 25' (o.g.); Bedoya (yellow card) 41'; Medina 45+2'; Parks 52', 76'; Haak (yellow card) 66'	Report	Smith (yellow card) 62'	Stadium: Belson Stadium; Attendance: 2,014; Referee: Lorant Varga

June 12	FC Cincinnati (MLS)	2–1 (a.e.t.)	Louisville City FC (USLC)	Cincinnati, Ohio
7:30 pm EDT	Adi 23' (yellow card) 117'; Manneh 103' (yellow card) 104'	Report	Mkosana 30'	Stadium: Nippert Stadium; Attendance: 6,895; Referee: Ismir Pekmic

June 12	Minnesota United FC (MLS)	4–1	Sporting Kansas City (MLS)	Saint Paul, Minnesota
7:00 pm CDT	Rodríguez 2'; Olum (yellow card) 39'; Finlay 46'; Quintero 55', 67'; Martin (yellow card) 72'; Dotson (yellow card) 85'	Report	Gerso 27'; Gutierrez (yellow card) 43'	Stadium: Allianz Field; Attendance: 7,211; Referee: Guido Gonzalez

June 12	FC Dallas (MLS)	4–0	OKC Energy FC (USLC)	Dallas, Texas
7:00 pm CDT	Hedges 11'; Bressan (yellow card) 20'; Barrios 43'; Badji 52'; Ziegler 90' (pen.)	Report	Brown (yellow card) 46'; Ross (yellow card) 55'; Harris (yellow card) 74'	Stadium: Westcott Field; Attendance: 1,296; Referee: Luis Guardia

June 12	Memphis 901 FC (USLC)	1–3	Orlando City SC (MLS)	Memphis, Tennessee
7:30 pm CDT	Collier 50'; Burch (yellow card) 60'	Report	Kljestan 38' (pen.), 55'; Jansson 71'	Stadium: Mike Rose Soccer Complex; Attendance: 3,088; Referee: Sergii Demianchuk

June 12	Colorado Rapids (MLS)	2–2 (a.e.t.) (2–4 p)	New Mexico United (USLC)	Commerce City, Colorado
7:30 pm MDT	Sjöberg (yellow card) 24' (yellow-red card) 72'; Rubio 35'; Blomberg (yellow card) 43'; Rosenberry (yellow card) 44'; Mezquida 46'; Acosta (yellow card) 86'; Wilson (yellow card) 89'	Report	Sandoval 3'; Hamilton (yellow card) 34'; Sampson (yellow card) 38'; Wehan (yellow card) 45'; Frater 90+4'; Moar (yellow card) 92'; Guzman (yellow card) 103'	Stadium: Dick's Sporting Goods Park; Attendance: 2,619; Referee: Malik Badawi
	Penalties
	Acosta (penalty scored); Wilson (penalty missed); Rosenberry (penalty scored); Nicholson (penalty missed)		(penalty scored) Frater; (penalty scored) Moar; (penalty scored) Sandoval; (penalty scored) Wehan

June 12	LA Galaxy (MLS)	3–0	Orange County FC (NPSL)	Carson, California
7:30 pm PDT	F. Álvarez (yellow card) 52'; E. Álvarez 55', 61'; Cuello 90'; Bingham (yellow card) 90+2'	Report	Davis (yellow card) 68'; Bryant (yellow card) 90+2'	Stadium: Dignity Health Sports Park Track Stadium; Attendance: 5,000; Referee: Andro Mariscal

June 12	Seattle Sounders FC (MLS)	1–2	Portland Timbers (MLS)	Tacoma, Washington
7:30 pm PDT	Roldan (yellow card) 30'; Bruin (yellow card) 45+2'; Rodríguez 44'	Report	Fernández 6', 50'	Stadium: Cheney Stadium; Attendance: 6,280; Referee: Alex Chilowicz

June 13	Atlanta United FC (MLS)	3–1 (a.e.t.)	Charleston Battery (USLC)	Kennesaw, Georgia
7:00 PM EDT	Larentowicz (yellow card) 17'; Martínez (yellow card) 73'; Williams 79', (yellow card) 98'; Vazquez 110', 120+1'	Report	Svantesson 20'; Bolt (yellow card) 90+4'; Higashi (yellow card) 116'	Stadium: Fifth Third Bank Stadium; Attendance: 0 Referee: Kevin Broadley
Note: Match played behind closed doors. Venue was moved due to unplayable field conditions at MUSC Health Stadium on June 11 in Charleston.

=== Round of 16 ===
The Round of 16 took place June 18, 19, and 20. The Round of 16 draw took place on June 13. The Fourth Round winners were divided geographically into four groups and pairings were determined within those groups. A fixed bracket for the rest of the tournament was established.

June 18 Mideast	Columbus Crew SC (MLS)	2–3	Atlanta United FC (MLS)	Columbus, Ohio
7:00 pm EDT	Accam 40'; Mullins (yellow card) 42'; Crognale (yellow card) 51'; Afful (yellow card) 67'; Guzan 71' (o.g.); Guzmán (yellow card) 86'	Report	Vazquez 5', 65'; Robinson 14'; Meram (yellow card) 19'; González Pírez (yellow card) 52'; Barco (yellow card) 90+3'	Stadium: Mapfre Stadium; Attendance: 8,659; Referee: Guido Gonzalez

June 18 Midwest	Houston Dynamo (MLS)	2–3	Minnesota United FC (MLS)	Houston, Texas
6:00 pm CDT	Peña 9'; Martínez 37'; Fuenmayor (yellow card) 40'	Report	Boxall (yellow card) 20'; Quintero 66', 82'; Toye 89'; Olum (yellow card) 90+4'	Stadium: BBVA Compass Stadium; Attendance: 4,559; Referee: Farhad Dadkho

June 19 East	D.C. United (MLS)	1–2	New York City FC (MLS)	Washington, D.C.
7:00 pm EDT	Rooney 32'; Robinson (yellow card) 55'; Acosta (yellow card) 69'; Rodríguez (yellow card) 76'	Report	Mitriță 38'; Tajouri-Shradi 41'	Stadium: Audi Field; Attendance: 9,000; Referee: Fotis Bazakos

June 19 East	Orlando City SC (MLS)	2–1 (a.e.t.)	New England Revolution (MLS)	Orlando, Florida
7:30 pm EDT	Michel 96'; Akindele 101'; Kljestan (yellow card) 105+1'; Michel (yellow card) 119'; DeJohn (yellow card) 120+4'	Report	Agudelo (yellow card) 95'; Castillo (yellow card) 115'; Rennicks 117'	Stadium: Exploria Stadium; Attendance: 5,556; Referee: Marcos de Oliveira

June 19 Midwest	FC Dallas (MLS)	1–2	New Mexico United (USLC)	Dallas, Texas
7:00 pm CDT	Servania 41'; Cerrillo (yellow card) 90+1'; Bressan (yellow card) 90+7'	Report	Frater 45', (yellow card) 59'; Hamilton 64'; Yearwood (yellow card) 68'; Mizell (yellow card) 90+2'; Padilla (yellow card) 90+3'	Stadium: Westcott Field; Attendance: 1,424; Referee: Jon Freemon

June 19 Mideast	Saint Louis FC (USLC)	1–0	FC Cincinnati (MLS)	Fenton, Missouri
7:30 pm CDT	Cicerone (yellow card) 70'; Fink 90+3'	Report	Hagglund (yellow card) 19'	Stadium: World Wide Technology Soccer Park; Attendance: 4,033; Referee: Michael Radchuk

June 19 West	Portland Timbers (MLS)	4–0	LA Galaxy (MLS)	Portland, Oregon
8:00 pm PDT	Kitchen 28' (o.g.); Fernández 34'; Blanco 37'; Moreira 82'	Report	Carrasco (yellow card) 45+2'	Stadium: Providence Park; Attendance: 16,235; Referee: Victor Rivas

June 20 West	Los Angeles FC (MLS)	3–1	San Jose Earthquakes (MLS)	Los Angeles, California
7:30 pm PDT	Rossi 35'; Diomande 60'; Vela 66'	Report	Qazaishvili 7'	Stadium: Banc of California Stadium; Attendance: 14,028; Referee: Joe Dickerson

=== Quarterfinals ===
The quarterfinal matches took place on July 10.

July 10 East	Orlando City SC (MLS)	1–1 (a.e.t.) (5–4 p)	New York City FC (MLS)	Orlando, Florida
7:30 pm EDT	Mueller 61'; Méndez (yellow card) 65'; Michel (yellow card) 113'	Report	Ibeagha (yellow card) 38'; Castellanos (yellow card) 82'; Chanot (yellow card) 90+2'; Moralez 90+6'; Tinnerholm (yellow card) 95'	Stadium: Exploria Stadium; Attendance: 7,227; Referee: Victor Rivas
	Penalties
	Akindele (penalty scored); Smith (penalty scored); Dwyer (penalty missed); Johnson (penalty scored); Powers (penalty scored); Rosell (penalty scored)		Ring (penalty missed); Castellanos (penalty scored); Tinnerholm (penalty scored); Parks (penalty scored); Medina (penalty scored); Chanot (penalty missed)

July 10 Mideast	Atlanta United FC (MLS)	2–0	Saint Louis FC (USLC)	Kennesaw, Georgia
7:30 pm EDT	Meram (yellow card) 45'; G. Martínez 52'; Robinson (yellow card) 61'; J. Martínez 90+5' (pen.)	Report	Umar (yellow card) 59'; Reynolds (yellow card) 90+4'	Stadium: Fifth Third Bank Stadium; Attendance: 7,523; Referee: Rosendo Mendoza

July 10 Midwest	Minnesota United FC (MLS)	6–1	New Mexico United (USLC)	Saint Paul, Minnesota
7:00 pm CDT	Rodríguez 10', 18', 45'; Quintero 16'; Greguš 23'; Ibarra 62'	Report	Moar 7'; Wehan (yellow card) 54'	Stadium: Allianz Field; Attendance: 12,401; Referee: Ramy Touchan

July 10 West	Los Angeles FC (MLS)	0–1	Portland Timbers (MLS)	Los Angeles, California
7:30 pm PDT	Segura (yellow card) 62'; Diomande (yellow card) 70'	Report	Blanco (yellow card) 34'; Mabiala (yellow card) 66'; Moreira (yellow card) 68'; Ebobisse 84'	Stadium: Banc of California Stadium; Attendance: 18,947; Referee: Alan Kelly

=== Semifinals ===
The semifinals took place on August 6 and August 7. The hosts of the semi-finals were drawn on July 11.

August 6	Orlando City SC (MLS)	0–2	Atlanta United FC (MLS)	Orlando, Florida
7:30 pm EDT		Report	Remedi 37'; Hyndman 78'	Stadium: Exploria Stadium; Attendance: 18,461; Referee: Rubiel Vazquez

August 7	Minnesota United FC (MLS)	2–1	Portland Timbers (MLS)	Saint Paul, Minnesota
7:00 pm CDT	Quintero 22' (pen.); Toye 64'	Report	Fernández 45+2'	Stadium: Allianz Field; Attendance: 15,073; Referee: Ismail Elfath

=== Final ===
The hosts were decided on July 11.

August 27, 2019
8:00 p.m. EDT

Atlanta United FC	2–1	Minnesota United FC
Gasper 10' (o.g.); G. Martínez 16'	Report	Lod 47'

Mercedes-Benz Stadium, Atlanta, Georgia
Attendance: 35,709
Referee: Allen Chapman

== Top goalscorers ==
Team eliminated for this round.

Rank	Player	Team	Goals	By round							
Rank	Player	Team	Goals	1R	2R	3R	4R	R16	QF	SF	F
1	(Colombia) Darwin Quintero	Minnesota United FC	6				2	2	1	1	
2	(Ghana) Charles Boateng	Richmond Kickers	4	4							
2	(Argentina) Brian Fernández	Portland Timbers	4				2	1		1	
2	(Colombia) Ángelo Rodríguez	Minnesota United FC	4				1		3		
2	(United States) Brandon Vazquez	Atlanta United FC	4				2	2			
5	(United States) Brandon Allen	Tampa Bay Rowdies	3		1	2					
5	(Israel) Orr Barouch	Cal FC	3	3							
5	(Jamaica) Kevaughn Frater	New Mexico United	3			1	1	1			
5	(Brazil) André Lima	Austin Bold FC	3		1	2					
5	(Georgia (country)) Valeri Qazaishvili	San Jose Earthquakes	3				2	1			
5	(United States) Devon Sandoval	New Mexico United	3		2		1				
5	(United States) Ian Svantesson	Charleston Battery	3		2		1				

Updated through SF

== Broadcasting ==
On April 5, 2019, U.S. Soccer announced a 4-year deal with ESPN to broadcast the Open Cup. The entire tournament, from first round to final, will be carried exclusively on the ESPN+ streaming service; in previous years, ESPN networks had only broadcast marquee matches such as the final.
