= 2018 Sacramento Republic FC season =

Sacramento Republic FC
2018 season
- Owner: Kevin M. Nagle
- Head coach: Simon Elliott
- Stadium: Papa Murphy's Park
Home colors	Away colors

The 2018 Sacramento Republic FC season was the club's fifth season of existence. The club played in the United Soccer League, the second tier of the American soccer pyramid, and competed in the Western Conference.

== Club ==
=== Roster ===
As of April 9, 2018.

No.	Position	Nation	Player
1	GK	USA	Josh Cohen
2	DF	TRI	Shannon Gomez
3	DF	USA	Josh Turnley
4	DF	USA	Mitchell Taintor
5	DF	USA	Justin Schmidt
7	MF	USA	Hayden Partain
8	FW	ENG	Wilson Kneeshaw
9	FW	USA	Christian Eissele
10	MF	CAN	Keven Alemán
11	MF	MEX	Luis Espino
12	DF	MEX	Carlos Rodriguez
14	DF	USA	Cole Seiler
16	MF	SCO	Adam Moffat
18	GK	DOM	Rafael Díaz
20	MF	BUL	Villyan Bijev
21	DF	MNE	Emrah Klimenta
22	DF	PUR	Jeremy Hall
23	MF	SVN	Jure Matjašič
24	MF	USA	Jaime Villarreal
26	DF	USA	Elliott Hord
30	GK	USA	Thomas Olsen
31	FW	USA	Cameron Iwasa
32	MF	USA	Roberto Hategan
40	FW	USA	Quincy Butler

=== Staff ===
As of February 1, 2018.

Position	Name
General Manager	(United States) Todd Dunivant
Director of Football	(England) Graham Smith
Head coach	(New Zealand) Simon Elliott
Head Assistant Coach	(United States) Benjamin Ziemer
Assistant coach	(United States) Antonio Sutton
Assistant coach/Goalkeepers	(England) Simon Sheppard
Strength & Conditioning Coach	(United States) Luke Rayfield
Head Athletic Trainer	(United States) John Duncan
Team Chiropractor	(United States) Jesse Saenz

== Competitions ==
=== Preseason ===
February 10, 2018	Sacramento Republic FC	2–1	Sacramento Gold	Sacramento, California
19:00 PST	Villarreal (yellow card) 10'; Bijev 15'; Alemán 86'	Report	Alkebulan (yellow card) 26', (goal) 57'; Padilla (yellow card) 37'; Wright (red card) 63'	Stadium: American River College Soccer Stadium

February 15, 2018	Sacramento Republic FC	1–3	Seattle Sounders FC	Sacramento, California
19:30 PST	Eissele 47'; Nana-Sinkam (yellow card) 84'	Report	Morris 2', 79'; Wingo 27'	Stadium: Papa Murphy's Park

February 22, 2018	San Jose Earthquakes	–	Sacramento Republic FC	San Jose, California
13:00 PST				Stadium: Avaya Stadium; Attendance: Closed-door
Note: Match result not publicized.

February 25, 2018	Sacramento Republic FC	0–1	Los Angeles FC	Sacramento, California
14:00 PST	Partain (yellow card) 47'	Report	Moutinho 60'; Czornomaz (yellow card) 70'	Stadium: Papa Murphy's Park; Attendance: 11,035

March 4, 2018	Sacramento Republic FC	1–1	Fresno FC	Turlock, California
19:00 PST	Taintor (yellow card) 19'; Iwasa 36'	Report	Barrera (yellow card) 19'; Kamdem (yellow card) 59'; Caffa 65'	Stadium: Warrior Stadium

March 10, 2018	FC Cincinnati	1–2	Sacramento Republic FC	Cincinnati, Ohio
12:00 PST	Lasso (yellow card) 20'; Ledesma (yellow card) 61'; Keinan 84'	Report	Seiler (yellow card) 25'; Iwasa 34'; Bijev 72'	Stadium: Nippert Stadium

=== USL ===
==== Standings ====
Pos	Team	Pld	W	D	L	GF	GA	GD	Pts	Qualification
1	Orange County SC	34	20	6	8	70	40	+30	66	Conference Playoffs
2	Sacramento Republic	34	19	8	7	47	32	+15	65	Conference Playoffs
3	Phoenix Rising FC	34	19	6	9	63	38	+25	63	Conference Playoffs
4	Real Monarchs	34	19	3	12	55	47	+8	60	Conference Playoffs
5	Reno 1868 FC	34	16	11	7	56	38	+18	59	Conference Playoffs

Source: 2018 USL standings
Rules for classification: 1) total wins; 2) total goal differential; 3) total goals scored; 4) points earned against top four Conference finishers; 5) disciplinary points; 6) coin toss or drawing of lots

==== Matches ====
Win Draw Loss Postponed

Kickoff times are in PDT (UTC-07) unless shown otherwise

March 17 1	Sacramento Republic FC	2–1	San Antonio FC	Sacramento, California
7:30 P.N.	Alemán 45+2', (yellow card) 77'; Eissele 48'; Hall (yellow card) 76'	Report	Restrepo (yellow card) 5'; Guzmán (yellow card) 38'; Lopez 68', (yellow card) 82'; Pecka (yellow card) 72'	Stadium: Papa Murphy's Park; Attendance: 11,569; Referee: Joseph Dickerson

March 24 2	Orange County SC	0–1	Sacramento Republic FC	Irvine, California
7:00 P.M.	Hashimoto (yellow card) 18'; Segbers (yellow card) 50'; Sorto (yellow card) 58'; Seaton (red card) 76'; Crognale (yellow card) 81'	Report	Iwasa 66'; Bijev (yellow card) 90+3'	Stadium: Championship Soccer Stadium; Attendance: 2,236; Referee: Farhad Dadkho

March 31 3	Rio Grande Valley FC Toros	2–2	Sacramento Republic FC	Edinburg, Texas
5:30 P.M.	Ontiveros (yellow card) 43'; Wharton 51' (pen.); James (yellow card) 74', (goal) 79'	Report	Bijev 30'; Iwasa (yellow card) 35', (goal) 80'; Donovan 90+2' (o.g.)	Stadium: H-E-B Park; Attendance: 5,903; Referee: Marco Vega

April 7 4	Sacramento Republic FC	1–0	Seattle Sounders FC 2	Sacramento, California
19:30 P.M.	Taintor (red card) 20'; Partain (yellow card) 70'; Moffat 71' (pen.)	Report	Ele (yellow card) 32' (yellow-red card) 44'; Ulysse (red card) 63'; Narbón (yellow card) 70'	Stadium: Papa Murphy's Park; Attendance: 11,569; Referee: Michael Radchuk
Note: Ele's second yellow was rescinded by the USL Disciplinary Committee.

April 14 5	Las Vegas Lights FC	1–1	Sacramento Republic FC	Las Vegas, Nevada
8:00 pm PDT	Huiqui 2'	Report	Eissele 57'	Stadium: Cashman Field; Attendance: 8,167; Referee: Kevin Stott

April 18 6	Sacramento Republic FC	2–1	Colorado Springs Switchbacks FC	Sacramento, California
7:30 P.M.	Iwasa 64'; Bijev 73'; Moffat (yellow card) 79'; Hall (yellow card) 79'	Report	Malcolm 28'; Burt (yellow card) 55'; Poaty (yellow card) 69'; Schweitzer (yellow card) 76'; Suggs (yellow card) 79'	Stadium: Papa Murphy's Park; Attendance: 11,569; Referee: L. Guardia

April 28 7	Sacramento Republic FC	1–1	Tulsa Roughnecks FC	Sacramento, California
7:30 P.M.	Seiler (yellow card) 45+2'; Gomez (yellow card) 45+6'; Vazquez 89'	Report	Rivas 2'; Jusino (yellow card) 31'; Mirković (yellow card) 58'	Stadium: Papa Murphy's Park; Attendance: 11,569; Referee: Victor Rivas

May 2 8	Portland Timbers 2	2–0	Sacramento Republic FC	Portland, Oregon
19:00 (PST)	Asprilla 16'; Zambrano (yellow card) 21'; Jadama 38'; Williams (yellow card) 90'	Report		Stadium: Providence Park; Attendance: 1,937; Referee: Mark Allatin

May 6 9	Seattle Sounders FC 2	1–2	Sacramento Republic FC	Tacoma, Washington
13:30 (PDT)	Ulysse (yellow card) 31'; Chenkam 61'; Meredith 82' (o.g.)	Boxscore	Taintor 41'	Stadium: Cheney Stadium; Attendance: 2.652; Referee: Farhad Dadkho

May 12 10	Sacramento Republic FC	2–3	Reno 1868 FC	Sacramento, California
	Matjašič 2'; Iwasa 12'	Report	Marie 57'; Brown 59'; Thiaw 62'	Stadium: Papa Murphy's Park; Attendance: 11,569; Referee: Elton García

May 19 11	Phoenix Rising FC	1–3	Sacramento Republic FC	Scottsdale, Arizona
7:30 P.M.	Wakasa (yellow card) 45+2' da Fonte (yellow card) 59'; Cortez 62'; Drogba (yellow card) 90+2'	Report; Report	Iwasa 8'; Bijev 21' (yellow card) 39'; Rodriguez (yellow card) 32'; Gomez (yellow card) 41'; Matjašič (yellow card) 64'; Kneeshaw 88'; Taintor (yellow card) 90+2'	Stadium: Phoenix Rising FC Soccer Complex; Attendance: 6,503; Referee: J.J. Bilinski

May 29 12	Real Monarchs	1–0	Sacramento Republic FC	Sandy, Utah
19:00	Portillo (yellow card) 33'; Hoffman 68'	Report		Stadium: Rio Tinto Stadium; Attendance: 1,137; Referee: Daniel Radford

June 2 13	Sacramento Republic FC	1–0	Orange County SC	Sacramento, California
8:00 P.M.	Hall 58' (pen.); Turnley (yellow card) 80'; Moffat (yellow card) 81'	Report	Hashimoto (yellow card) 10'; Amico (yellow card) 26', (yellow card) 90+3' (red card); Kontor (yellow card) 32'; Juel-Nielsen (yellow card) 90+1'; Ramos-Godoy (yellow card) 90+2'	Stadium: Papa Murphy's Park; Attendance: 11,569; Referee: Malik Badawi

June 9 14	Sacramento Republic FC	0–0	Phoenix Rising FC	Sacramento, California
8:00 P.M.	Villarreal (yellow card) 53'; Taintor (yellow card) 85'	Report	Dia (yellow card) 13'; Awako (yellow card) 54'; Lambert (yellow card) 83'	Stadium: Papa Murphy's Park; Attendance: 11,569; Referee: Victor Rivas

June 13 15	Fresno FC	0–1	Sacramento Republic FC	Fresno, California
7:00 P.M.	Johnson (yellow card) 85'	Report	Vazquez 37'	Stadium: Chukchansi Park; Attendance: 4,136; Referee: Alejandro Mariscal

June 16 16	San Antonio FC	1–0	Sacramento Republic FC	San Antonio, Texas
5:30 P.M.	Elizondo 43'	Report	Gomez (yellow card) 28'; Bijev (yellow card) 43'; Hall (yellow card) 60'	Stadium: Toyota Field; Attendance: 6,613; Referee: Rosendo Mendoza
Note: 75th USL league match

June 23 17	Sacramento Republic FC	2–2	Saint Louis FC	Sacramento, California
10:00 PM CDT	Iwasa 28', 47'; Vazquez (yellow card) 41'; Hall (yellow card) 84'	Report	Greig (yellow card) 50'; Dikwa 74'; Fall 90'	Stadium: Papa Murphy's Park; Attendance: 10,570; Referee: Elton García

June 30 18	Fresno FC	2–0	Sacramento Republic FC	Fresno, California
7:00 P.M.	Caffa 38'; Caffa (yellow card) 44'; Daly (yellow card) 45+2'; Ribeiro (yellow card) 87'; Ellis-Hayden (yellow card) 90'; Argueta (yellow card) 90+1'; Tayou 90+2', (yellow card) 90+3'	Report	Gomez (yellow card) 31'; Hall (yellow card) 87'	Stadium: Chukchansi Park; Attendance: 4,571; Referee: Ramy Touchan

July 7 19	Sacramento Republic FC	0–0	Real Monarchs	Sacramento, California
10:00 PM CDT	Moffat (yellow card) 50'	Report	Velásquez (yellow card) 66'; Moberg (yellow card) 73'; Gallagher (yellow card) 78'	Stadium: Papa Murphy's Park; Attendance: 11,569; Referee: Mark Allatin

July 10 20	Swope Park Rangers	1–3	Sacramento Republic FC	Kansas City, Kansas
5:30 P.M.	Barry 70'	Report	Iwasa 45', 54'; Eissele (yellow card) 67' (goal) 88'; Klimenta (yellow card) 73'	Stadium: Children's Mercy Park; Attendance: 941; Referee: Rubiel Vazquez

July 14 21	Colorado Springs Switchbacks FC	0–1	Sacramento Republic FC	Colorado Springs, Colorado
5:00 P.M.	Colvey (yellow card) 58'; Uzo (yellow card) 88'	Report	Bijev (yellow card) 35' (goal) 37'; Seiler (yellow card) 85'; Klimenta (yellow card) 90+7'	Stadium: Weidner Field; Attendance: 3,808; Referee: Joe Wykowski

July 21 22	Sacramento Republic FC	1–1	OKC Energy FC	Sacramento, California
8:00 P.M.	Iwasa 23'; Turnley (yellow card) 43'	Report	Harris (yellow card) 30'; A. Dixon (yellow card) 55'; Ibeagha (yellow card) 65'; Volesky 78'	Stadium: Papa Murphy's Park; Attendance: 11,569; Referee: Turan Ozdemir

August 4 23	Sacramento Republic FC	1–0	Fresno FC	Sacramento, California
8:00 P.M.	Villareal (yellow card) 44'; Bijev 76'	Report	Baldisimo (yellow card) 32'; Cooper (yellow card) 38'; Ribeiro (yellow card) 82'	Stadium: Papa Murphy's Park; Attendance: 10,632; Referee: Lukasz Szpala

August 11 24	Sacramento Republic FC	2–1	Rio Grande Valley FC Toros	Sacramento, California
8:00 P.M.	Iwasa 61'; Alemán (yellow card) 64'; Hall 68'; Matjašič (yellow card) 78'; Bijev (yellow card) 80'	Report	Small 1'; Wharton (yellow card) 83'	Stadium: Papa Murphy's Park; Attendance: 10,937; Referee: Farhad Dadkho

August 15 25	Saint Louis FC	2–1	Sacramento Republic	Fenton, Missouri
7:30 PM CDT	Hertzog 5'; Greig 7'; Kavita (yellow card) 62'; Reynolds (yellow card) 69'; Culbertson (yellow card) 90+2'	Report	Villarreal 67'; Taintor (yellow card) 90+1'	Stadium: Toyota Stadium; Attendance: 3,127; Referee: Marcos de Oliveira

August 18 26	Sacramento Republic FC	1–4	LA Galaxy II	Sacramento, California
8:00 PM	Requejo 56' (o.g.); Iwasa (yellow card) 75'; Alemán (yellow card) 75'	Report	Aguilar 7'; Zubak 20' (pen.); Engola 25'; López 41', (yellow card) 80'; Requejo (yellow card) 77'	Stadium: Papa Murphy's Park; Attendance: 11,569; Referee: Ismir Pekmic

August 25 27	Reno 1868 FC	1–2	Sacramento Republic FC	Reno, Nevada
7:30 PM	Carroll (yellow card) 30'; Casiple 75' (pen.)	Report	Taintor (yellow card) 5'; Iwasa 47'; Kneeshaw 60'	Stadium: Greater Nevada Field; Attendance: 7,103; Referee: Elijio Arreguin

September 8 28	Sacramento Republic FC	3–0	Seattle Sounders FC 2	Sacramento, California
19:30 (PDT)	Iwasa 20'; Eissele 58', 64' (pen.); Klimenta (yellow card) 76'	https://www.uslchampionship.com/sacramentorepublicfc-seattlesoundersfc2-971679 Preview	Alfaro (yellow card) 30', (yellow card) 63' (red card); Olsen (yellow card) 90+2'	Stadium: Papa Murphy's Park; Referee: Thomas Snyder

September 19 29	Tulsa Roughnecks FC	1–4	Sacramento Republic FC	Tulsa, Oklahoma
	Vukovic 62' (pen.)	Report	Hord 20'; Partain 54', 80'; Iwasa 68'	Stadium: ONEOK Field; Referee: Rubiel Vazquez

September 23 30	OKC Energy	0–0	Sacramento Republic	Oklahoma City, Oklahoma
4:00 P.M.	Harris (yellow card) 9'; Ross (yellow card) 84'	Report	Gomez (yellow card) 39'; Matjašič (yellow card) 78'	Stadium: Taft Stadium; Attendance: 6,084; Referee: Rosendo Mendoza

September 29 31	Sacramento Republic FC	1–0	Portland Timbers 2	Sacramento, California
19:30 (PST)	Iwasa 6' (Hord); Seiler (yellow card) 90+5'	Report	Smith (yellow card) 58' (yellow card) 74' (red card); Zambrano (yellow card) 83'; Diz Pe (yellow card) 90+7'	Stadium: Papa Murphy's Park; Attendance: 11,569; Referee: Michael Radchuk

October 3 32	Sacramento Republic FC	3–1	Swope Park Rangers	Sacramento, California
7:30 P.M.	Bijev 17'; Iwasa 57'; Hall (yellow card) 60'; Matjašič 76'	Report	Blackwood 31'	Stadium: Papa Murphy's Park; Referee: Daniel Radford

October 6 33	LA Galaxy II	1–2	Sacramento Republic FC	Carson, California
19:30	F. López 24', (yellow card) 71'; Vera (yellow card) 45+1'	Report	Alemán 13', 21'; Turnley (yellow card) 51'; Seiler (yellow card) 62' (yellow-red card) 74'	Stadium: StubHub Center; Attendance: 1,241; Referee: Malik Badawi

October 13 34	Sacramento Republic FC	1–0	Las Vegas Lights FC	Sacramento, California
7:30 pm PDT	Matjašič (yellow card) 30'; Taintor (yellow card) 45+1'; Iwasa 55'; Gomez (yellow card) 65'; Hord (yellow card) 69'	Report	Torres (yellow card) 45+2'; Mendoza (yellow card) 54'; Ochoa (yellow card) 70'; Garcia (yellow card) 87'; Herrera-Perla (yellow card) 90+3'	Stadium: Papa Murphy's Park; Attendance: 11,569; Referee: Lukasz Szpala

==== Postseason ====
October 20 Quarterfinal	Sacramento Republic FC	1–2	Swope Park Rangers	Sacramento, California
7:30 P.M.	Bijev 16'; Matjašič (yellow card) 38'; Hord (yellow card) 68'	Report	Kuzain 27'; Barry 31'; Akhmatov (yellow card) 58'	Stadium: Papa Murphy's Park; Attendance: 11,569; Referee: Joseph Dickerso

=== U.S. Open Cup ===
May 16 2nd Round	Sacramento Republic FC	3–1	San Francisco City FC	Sacramento, California
5:00 P.M.	Alemán 24'; Bijev 61'; Moffat 68'	SAC Report	Lombardi 31'	Stadium: Hornet Field; Referee: Elijio Arreguin

May 23 3rd Round	Reno 1868 FC	0–1	Sacramento Republic FC	Reno, Nevada
7:30 P.M.		RNO Report	Alemán 69'	Stadium: Greater Nevada Field; Referee: Vince Apple-Chiarella

June 6 4th Round	Sacramento Republic FC	2–1 (a.e.t.)	Seattle Sounders FC	Sacramento, California
8:00 P.M.	Iwasa 60'; Bijev (yellow card) 84'; Hall (yellow card) 85'; Matjašič 115'	Report	Chenkam (yellow card) 11'; Roldan (yellow card) 62'; Ele (yellow card) 81'; Shipp 90+1'; Olsen (yellow card) 110'	Stadium: Papa Murphy's Park; Attendance: 5,619; Referee: Joseph Dickerson (California)

June 20 Round of 16	Los Angeles FC	3–2	Sacramento Republic FC	Los Angeles, California
7:30 P.M.	Feilhaber 58' (Atuesta); Rossi 67' (Nguyen); Blessing	Report	Rodriguez (yellow card) 18'; Hord 35'; Gomez (yellow card) 45+2'; Bijev 60' (Villarreal); Matjasic (yellow card) 66'	Stadium: Banc of California Stadium; Attendance: 8,750; Referee: Nima Saghafi
