= Hațegan =

Hațegan is a Romanian surname. It is a toponymic surname, derived from Hațeg. Notable people with the surname include:

- Nadia Hațegan (born 1979), Romanian gymnast
- Ovidiu Hațegan (born 1980), Romanian football referee
- Roberto Hațegan (born 2001), Romanian-American footballer
