= Roberto Hațegan =

American soccer player

Personal information
- Full name: Nicholas Roberto Hațegan
- Date of birth: April 26, 2001 (age 25)
- Place of birth: Chicago, Illinois, United States
- Height: 5 ft 10 in (1.78 m)
- Position: Attacking midfielder

Youth career
- 2015–2017: Sacramento Republic
- 2019–2020: 1. FC Nürnberg

Senior career*
Years	Team	Apps	(Gls)
2017–2019	Sacramento Republic	2	(0)
2021–2022	Politehnica Timișoara	8	(1)
2022–2023	Unirea Bascov	9	(7)
2023	San Jose Earthquakes II	26	(4)
2024	Sporting Kansas City II	15	(1)

International career
2016	United States U16	2	(0)
2018	United States U18	4	(2)
- * Club domestic league appearances and goals as of September 14, 2024

Nicholas Roberto Hațegan (born April 26, 2001) is an American former professional soccer player who last played as an attacking midfielder for MLS Next Pro club Sporting Kansas City II.

== Club career ==
At age 16, Hațegan became the first player signed from Sacramento Republic FC's U.S. Soccer Development Academy teams. Hategan made his professional debut against Pachuca on July 15, 2017, starting and playing 45 minutes against the Liga MX club. Prior to playing with the first team, Hategan spent two seasons with Republic FC's Academy.

In June 2019, Hațegan signed a contract with German club 1. FC Nürnberg.

Hațegan joined MLS Next Pro side Sporting Kansas City II on January 15, 2024. On February 20, 2025, he announced his retirement on his social media profile.

== Personal ==
Hațegan is of Romanian descent and holds dual American and Romanian citizenship. After ending his football career, he became a real estate agent.

== Career statistics ==
As of April 23, 2023

Club	Season	League			National cup (Note: Includes U.S. Open Cup and Cupa României)		Continental		Other		Totals	
Club	Season	League	Apps	Goals	Apps	Goals	Apps	Goals	Apps	Goals	Apps	Goals
Sacramento Republic	2017	USL	1	0	—		—		—		1	0
Sacramento Republic	2018	USL	1	0	1	0	—		—		2	0
Sacramento Republic	2019	USL	0	0	—		—		—		0	0
Sacramento Republic	Total		2	0	1	0	—		—		3	0
Politehnica Timișoara	2021–22	Liga II	8	1	1	0	—		—		9	1
Unirea Bascov	2021–22	Liga III	9	7	—		—		—		9	7
San Jose Earthquakes II	2023	MLS Next Pro	3	0	—		—		—		3	0
Career totals			22	8	2	0	0	0	0	0	24	8
