= Keven Alemán =

Canadian soccer player (born 1994)

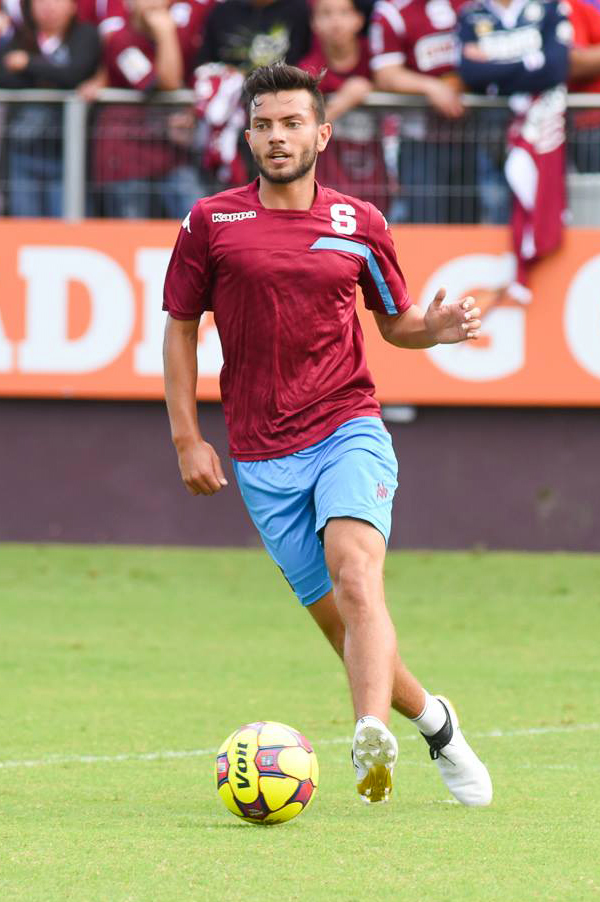
- Alemán with Saprissa in January 2017

Personal information
- Full name: Keven Steven Alemán Bustos
- Date of birth: March 25, 1994 (age 32)
- Place of birth: San José, Costa Rica
- Height: 1.72 m (5 ft 8 in)
- Position: Attacking midfielder

Team information
- Current team: Rayong
- Number: 8

Youth career
- 2010–2011: Toronto FC
- 2011–2013: Real Valladolid

Senior career*
Years	Team	Apps	(Gls)
2013–2014	Valladolid Promesas	15	(0)
2014–2016	Herediano	19	(2)
2015	→ Belén (loan)	18	(4)
2016	Belén	10	(0)
2017	Saprissa	13	(1)
2018–2019	Sacramento Republic FC	43	(4)
2020	FC Edmonton	7	(1)
2021	Valour FC	24	(3)
2021	→ Guadalupe (loan)	10	(1)
2022	Atlético Ottawa	25	(2)
2023–2024	Persikabo 1973	13	(2)
2024	Puntarenas	4	(0)
2025	Scrosoppi FC	4	(0)
2025	→ Scrosoppi FC B	2	(1)
2025–	Rayong	6	(1)

International career
2010–2011	Canada U17	8	(3)
2013	Canada U20	2	(0)
2015–2017	Canada U23	3	(0)
2013–2017	Canada	4	(0)
- * Club domestic league appearances and goals as of July 6, 2025

Keven Steven Alemán Bustos (born March 25, 1994) is a professional soccer player who plays as an attacking midfielder for Rayong in the Thai League 1. Born in Costa Rica, he represented Canada internationally.

== Club career ==
=== Early career ===
Alemán was born in San José, Costa Rica, where he grew up in Moravia, Costa Rica and moved to Brampton, Ontario when he was 10. He attended St. Edmund Campion Secondary School. Keven started playing with Brampton A as soon as he moved to Brampton. Before joining Toronto FC, he played on the Under 16 Ontario Provincial Team coached by Patrick Tobo which also featured fellow players Bryce Alderson and Quillan Roberts. After the Provincial team he joined the TFC Academy in the Canadian Soccer League. Alemán showed great promise along with other Canadians Michael Petrasso and Dylan Carreiro, however all three players left over various issues with Aron Winter, the club's manager at the time. Before leaving to go on trial in Europe, Keven had his rights traded by Toronto FC to the Vancouver Whitecaps in return for Terry Dunfield. However, after a successful trial period in 2011 and attaining his visa, Alemán was able to join the youth ranks at Real Valladolid in Spain. He helped the club's reserve team achieve promotion from the fourth tier to the third tier.

=== Herediano ===
In August 2014, Alemán left Real Valladolid to join Herediano of Costa Rica. He was unveiled by the team on August 7 with fellow signee Antonio Pedroza. He debuted for Herediano on September 11 in a friendly, and scored a goal for the side in a 3–1 victory. Alemán made his league debut more than two months later on November 30 in a 1–0 victory over Santos de Guápiles.

Alemán was loaned out to fellow Costa Rican side Belén in January 2015, for the remainder of the season. He made his debut for the team against Carmelita on January 2. He scored his first goal for Belén against Limón in a 1–4 loss on February 14.

=== Belén ===
In July 2016, Aleman transferred to Belén, in order to accommodate his request for more playing time.

=== Saprissa ===
In December 2016, it was announced that Aleman had signed a 2.5 year contract with Saprissa. In January 2018, it was announced that Aleman had left the club after one year.

=== Sacramento Republic ===
In January 2018, Alemán signed with USL side Sacramento Republic FC for the 2018 season.

=== FC Edmonton ===
On 24 March 2020, Alemán signed with Canadian Premier League side FC Edmonton. He made his debut for the Eddies on August 16 against Forge FC.

=== Valour FC ===
On 2 February 2021, Alemán returned to Costa Rica, signing with Liga FPD side Guadalupe. Two days later, it was clarified that he had signed with Valour FC and was being sent on loan to Guadalupe for the remainder of the 2020–21 Liga FPD.

=== Atlético Ottawa ===
On 26 January 2022, Alemán signed a one-year contract with Canadian Premier League side Atlético Ottawa, with an option for another year. He scored two goals throughout the 2022 campaign, as the club won the CPL regular season.

He left the club in December of the same year, following the club's decision to not exercise their contract option for 2023.

=== Persikabo 1973 ===
On 4 November 2023, Alemán officially joined Indonesian side Persikabo 1973 on a free transfer. He made his debut for the club on the same day, coming on as a substitute for the second half of a league match against RANS Nusantara: four minutes later, he scored a goal through a volley from outside the penalty area, thus contributing to a 2–1 victory.

=== Puntarenas ===
Alemán returned to Costa Rica on May 24, 2024, to sign with Puntarenas.

=== Rayong ===
In the summer of 2025, he returned to Asia to compete in the Thai League 1 with Rayong.

== International career ==
Alemán was eligible for both Costa Rica and Canada. He began with numerous training camps with Sean Flemming's U17 Canadian side in April 2011 and eventually became a large part of the group leading through the Concacaf championship onto the World Cup. He was a part of Canada's U17 soccer team, making his debut in the 2011 FIFA U-17 World Cup. He was also a part of Canada's 2013 CONCACAF U-20 Championship team. Alemán would later reveal to media that Jorge Luis Pinto had approached him about representing Costa Rica in December 2012, a month before the U-20 tournament. He declined, stating he was committed to the Canadian program.

On June 27, 2013, Alemán was listed as a part of the confirmed 23-man squad for Colin Miller's Canada squad for 2013 CONCACAF Gold Cup. Alemán made his senior debut for Canada against Mexico July 11 as a second-half substitute for Kyle Bekker, the game ended in a 2–0 defeat.

After more than three years out of the national team picture, Alemán returned to the side under coach Octavio Zambrano, appearing in a 1–0 defeat to El Salvador on October 8, 2017.

== Honours ==
=== Atlético Ottawa ===
- Canadian Premier League
  - Regular Season: 2022

=== Individual ===
- Liga 1 Goal of the Month: November 2023

== Career statistics ==
=== International ===
As of match played 8 October 2017

Appearances and goals by national team and year
National team	Year	Apps	Goals
Canada	2013	3	0
Canada	2017	1	0
Total		4	0
