= Ariel Viegas =

Argentine footballer

Personal information
- Full name: Hugo Ariel Viegas Barriga
- Date of birth: 25 June 1989 (age 37)
- Place of birth: Argentina
- Height: 1.77 m (5 ft 10 in)
- Position: Midfielder

Youth career
- All Boys
- San Lorenzo

Senior career*
Years	Team	Apps	(Gls)
2009–2010	Brujas	6	(0)
2013–2017	UAI Urquiza	76	(4)
2017–2018	Barracas Central	20	(1)
2018	Acassuso	10	(0)
2019	El Farolito	8	(1)
- * Club domestic league appearances and goals

Hugo Ariel Viegas Barriga (born 25 June 1989) is an Argentine professional footballer who plays as a midfielder.

== Career ==
Viegas began his youth career with All Boys, prior to joining the San Lorenzo academy. He played the 2009–10 campaign with Brujas in Costa Rica's Primera División, making six appearances which included his professional debut versus Cartaginés on 16 August 2009. Four years later, Viegas returned to his homeland with UAI Urquiza of Primera B Metropolitana. He scored on his sixth appearance against Acassuso, with another goal coming in a 1–0 win over Comunicaciones. He notched versus the same opponents in the following 2015 campaign, alongside a strike in a game with Atlanta, as he featured seventy-nine times for them.

Viegas spent the 2017–18 season with fellow tier three team Barracas Central. On 5 June 2018, Viegas completed a move to Acassuso. His first appearances arrived in the succeeding August in matches with Colegiales, Comunicaciones and Talleres. In 2019, Viegas moved to National Premier Soccer League side El Farolito in the United States. He netted his first goal on 15 June against East Bay FC Stompers.

== Career statistics ==
As of 29 June 2019.

Appearances and goals by club, season and competition
Club	Season	League			Cup		League Cup		Continental		Other		Total	
Club	Season	Division	Apps	Goals	Apps	Goals	Apps	Goals	Apps	Goals	Apps	Goals	Apps	Goals
Brujas	2009–10	Primera División	6	0	—		—		—		0	0	6	0
UAI Urquiza	2013–14	Primera B Metropolitana	5	0	2	0	—		—		0	0	7	0
UAI Urquiza	2014	Primera B Metropolitana	13	2	0	0	—		—		0	0	13	2
UAI Urquiza	2015	Primera B Metropolitana	27	2	1	0	—		—		0	0	28	2
UAI Urquiza	2016	Primera B Metropolitana	10	0	0	0	—		—		0	0	10	0
UAI Urquiza	2016–17	Primera B Metropolitana	21	0	0	0	—		—		0	0	21	0
UAI Urquiza	Total		76	4	3	0	—		—		0	0	79	4
Barracas Central	2017–18	Primera B Metropolitana	20	1	0	0	—		—		0	0	20	1
Acassuso	2018–19	Primera B Metropolitana	10	0	0	0	—		—		0	0	10	0
El Farolito	2019	NPSL	8	1	2	0	—		—		0	0	10	1
Career total			120	6	5	0	—		—		0	0	125	6
