= Sal Esposito =

American professional soccer player

Personal information
- Full name: Salvatore Esposito
- Date of birth: September 16, 2001 (age 25)
- Place of birth: Albany, New York, United States
- Height: 1.70 m (5 ft 7 in)
- Positions: Attacking midfielder; forward

Team information
- Current team: Lentigione

Youth career
- Manhattan Kickers
- 2010–2017: Genoa
- 2017–2018: Napoli
- 2018–2019: New York Red Bulls

Senior career*
Years	Team	Apps	(Gls)
2019–2020	New York Red Bulls II	4	(0)
2020–2021	Fiorenzuola	36	(1)
2021–	Lentigione	0	(0)
- * Club domestic league appearances and goals as of 21 December 2021

Salvatore "Sal" Esposito (born September 16, 2001) is an American professional soccer player who plays as a forward for Italian club Lentigione.

== Club career ==
Esposito started his career with Manhattan Kickers before moving to Italy in 2010 and playing with Genoa's youth team. He stayed there for seven years before moving to the academy at Napoli in 2017. However, one year later, Esposito returned to the United States to join the New York Red Bulls academy side.

On May 7, 2019, Esposito came on for the New York Red Bulls U-23 side in their second round U.S. Open Cup match against FC Motown. He came on as an 81st–minute substitute for Vincent Borden and scored the final penalty in a 5–3 shootout victory. A couple of weeks later, on May 24, Esposito made his professional debut when he came on as a substitute for New York Red Bulls II in their USL Championship match against North Carolina FC. He came on in the 85th–minute substitute for Ben Mines as Red Bulls II was defeated 2–1.

On October 11, 2020, Esposito signed for Italian club US Fiorenzuola 1922 for an undisclosed fee. Esposito made his debut for the club on October 11, 2020, against SSDRL Marignanese Calcio as a 60th-minute substitute as they drew the game 0-0.

On December 28, 2021, he moved to fourth-tier Serie D club Lentigione.

== International career ==
Esposito earned his first international call-up for the United States under-18 side in 2018.

== Career statistics ==
As of Match played 4 September 2021

Club	Season	League			Cup		Continental		Total	
Club	Season	Division	Apps	Goals	Apps	Goals	Apps	Goals	Apps	Goals
New York Red Bulls U-23	2019	League Two	0	0	1	0	—	—	1	0
New York Red Bulls II	2019	USL Championship	4	0	—	—	—	—	4	0
US Fiorenzuola 1922	2020–21	Serie D/D	17	1	—	—	—	—	17	1
US Fiorenzuola 1922	2021–22	Serie C/A	2	0	—	—	—	—	2	0
US Fiorenzuola 1922	Total		19	1	0	0	0	0	19	1
Career total			23	1	1	0	0	0	24	1
