= Cole Seiler =

American soccer player (born 1994)

Personal information
- Date of birth: February 5, 1994 (age 32)
- Place of birth: Anderson, South Carolina, U.S.
- Height: 6 ft 1 in (1.85 m)
- Position: Defender

College career
Years	Team	Apps	(Gls)
2012–2015	Georgetown Hoyas	87	(4)

Senior career*
Years	Team	Apps	(Gls)
2013	Orlando City U-23	11	(0)
2014	Baltimore Bohemians	8	(0)
2016–2017	Vancouver Whitecaps FC	2	(0)
2016–2017	→ Whitecaps FC 2 (loan)	42	(0)
2018	Sacramento Republic	18	(0)
2019	Greenville Triumph	26	(1)

International career
- United States U17
- * Club domestic league appearances and goals as of October 21, 2019

Cole Seiler (born February 5, 1994) is an American former soccer player.

== Career ==
=== College career ===
Seiler played four years of college soccer at Georgetown University between 2012 and 2015, where he helped the Hoyas win a Big East Conference regular season title as well as the Big East Tournament championship.

While at college, Seiler played with Premier Development League sides Orlando City U-23 and Baltimore Bohemians.

=== Professional ===
On January 14, 2016, Seiler was selected by Vancouver Whitecaps FC in the 2016 MLS SuperDraft as the 16th pick. He officially signed with the club on February 8, 2016. He made his first team debut on June 1 during the 2016 Canadian Championship.

Seiler signed with USL side Sacramento Republic FC on January 25, 2018, for the 2018 season.

On February 4, 2019, Seiler returned to his native South Carolina, signing with Greenville Triumph SC in USL League One.

On February 11, 2020, Seiler announced his retirement from professional soccer.
