= Charalampos Chantzopoulos =

German footballer

Personal information
- Full name: Charalampos Prokopios Chantzopoulos
- Date of birth: 8 July 1994 (age 32)
- Place of birth: Bielefeld, Germany
- Height: 1.94 m (6 ft 4 in)
- Position: Centre-back

Team information
- Current team: SC Wiedenbrück
- Number: 21

Youth career
- VfL Theesen
- 2011–2013: VfR Wellensiek

Senior career*
Years	Team	Apps	(Gls)
2013–2014	VfR Wellensiek	31	(5)
2014–2016	Arminia Bielefeld II	37	(1)
2016–2017	FC Gütersloh	17	(0)
2017	FF Jaro	23	(1)
2018	Rot-Weiß Erfurt	5	(0)
2018	KPV	15	(4)
2019	Sacramento Republic FC	27	(1)
2020–2023	KPV	99	(13)
2024	Valour FC	16	(0)
2026–	SC Wiedenbrück	19	(0)
- * Club domestic league appearances and goals as of 23 September 2026

Charalampos Prokopios Chantzopoulos (Greek: Χαράλαμπος Προκόπιος Χαντζόπουλος; born 8 July 1994), also known as Haris Chantzopoulos, is a German professional footballer who plays as a centre-back for Regionalliga West club SC Wiedenbrück.

== Early life ==
Chantzopoulos was born in Bielefeld, Germany to Greek parents. He played youth football with VfL Theesen, later joining VfR Wellensiek in 2011.

== Career ==
Chantzopoulos began his senior career in the German lower divisions, playing with VfR Wellensiek in the Bezirksliga in the late stages of the 2012–2013 season and the Landesliga in the 2013–14 season.

In the summer of 2014, he moved to Oberliga side Arminia Bielefeld II. He made his debut on 17 August 2014 against SV Wunschel.

In July 2016, he joined Oberliga side FC Gütersloh.

In January 2017, he signed with Finnish Ykkönen club FF Jaro.

In February 2018, he returned to Germany, signing with Rot-Weiß Erfurt in the 3. Liga.

In June 2018, he returned to Finland joining KPV. On 6 October 2018, he scored a hat trick in a victory over Klubi 04.

In January 2019, he signed with USL Championship club Sacramento Republic FC.

In January 2020, he returned to his former club in Finland, KPV. In February 2022, he signed a one-year extension with the club. In January 2023, he once again extended his contract for an additional season.

In January 2024, he signed with Canadian Premier League club Valour FC.

On 13 January 2026, after spending the whole 2025 without a club, he signed a contract with German Regionalliga West club SC Wiedenbrück on a one-and-a-half year contract.

== Career statistics ==
As of match played 19 October 2024

Appearances and goals by club, season and competition
Club	Season	League			National cup		Other		Total	
Club	Season	Division	Apps	Goals	Apps	Goals	Apps	Goals	Apps	Goals
VfR Wellensiek	2012–13	Bezirksliga Westfalen	2	0	—		—		2	0
VfR Wellensiek	2013–14	Landesliga Westfalen	29	5	—		—		29	5
VfR Wellensiek	Total		31	5	0	0	0	0	31	5
Arminia Bielefeld II	2014–15	Oberliga Westfalen	25	1	—		—		25	1
Arminia Bielefeld II	2015–16	Oberliga Westfalen	12	0	—		—		12	0
Arminia Bielefeld II	Total		37	1	0	0	0	0	37	1
FC Gütersloh	2016–17	Oberliga Westfalen	17	0	—		1 (Note: Appearance in Westfalen Cup)	0	18	0
FF Jaro	2017	Ykkönen	23	1	6	0	—		17	4
Rot-Weiß Erfurt	2017–18	3. Liga	5	0	0	0	—		31	1
KPV	2018	Ykkönen	15	4	0	0	2 (Note: Appearances in Promotion playoffs)	0	17	4
Sacramento Republic FC	2019	USL Championship	27	1	3	0	1	0	31	1
KPV	2020	Ykkönen	20	0	1	0	—		21	0
KPV	2021	Ykkönen	26	4	1	0	—		27	4
KPV	2022	Ykkönen	27	7	1	0	—		28	7
KPV	2023	Ykkönen	26	2	1	0	—		27	2
KPV	Total		99	13	4	0	0	0	103	13
Valour FC	2024	Canadian Premier League	16	0	1	0	—		17	0
Career total			270	25	14	0	4	0	288	25
