= Sam Werner =

American soccer player

Personal information
- Date of birth: December 3, 1995 (age 30)
- Place of birth: Bozeman, Montana, United States
- Height: 5 ft 10 in (1.78 m)
- Position: Midfielder

Youth career
- 2010–2012: Bozeman Blitzz
- 2012–2014: Portland Timbers

College career
Years	Team	Apps	(Gls)
2014–2017	Stanford Cardinal	67	(9)

Senior career*
Years	Team	Apps	(Gls)
2018	Hapoel Hadera	0	(0)
2019–2020	Sacramento Republic	47	(7)
- * Club domestic league appearances and goals as of October 4, 2020

Sam Werner (born December 3, 1995) is a former American soccer player who previously played for Sacramento Republic FC in the USL Championship.

== Career ==
=== College ===
Werner played four years of college soccer at Stanford University between 2014 and 2017, where he made 67 appearances, scoring 9 goals and tallying 9 assists. Werner missed the entirety of Stanford's 2014 season due to injury.

=== Professional ===
Werner spent time on trial in Israel with Hapoel Hadera, making two appearances for the club in the Toto Cup.

On December 18, 2018, Werner signed with USL Championship side Sacramento Republic.

On October 20, 2020, Werner announced his retirement from professional soccer.
