= Elliott Hord =

American soccer player

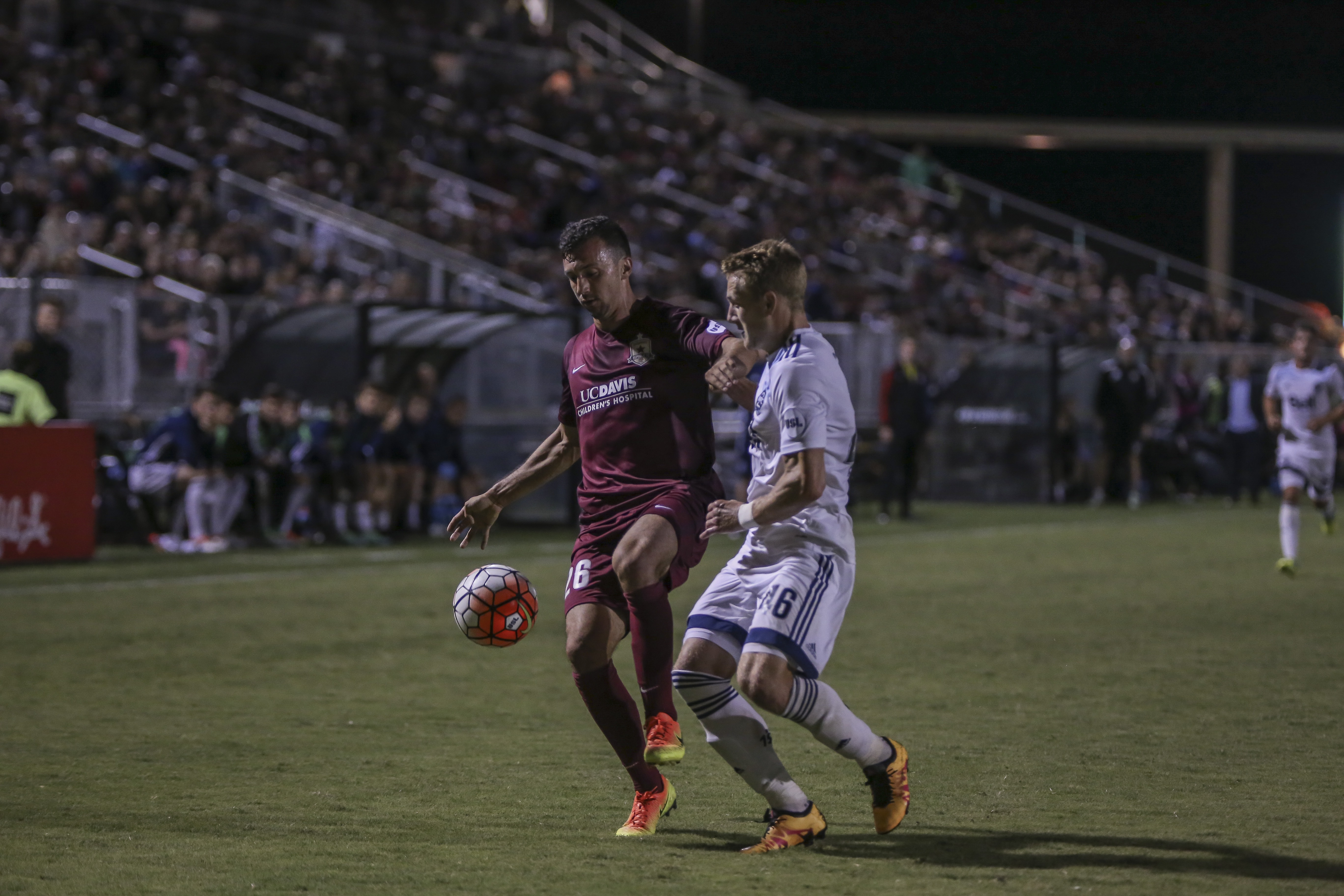
- Elliott Hord versus Vancouver Whitecaps

Personal information
- Date of birth: August 13, 1991 (age 35)
- Place of birth: Fresno, California, United States
- Height: 1.75 m (5 ft 9 in)
- Position: Defender

College career
Years	Team	Apps	(Gls)
2010–2013	UC Davis Aggies	67	(1)

Senior career*
Years	Team	Apps	(Gls)
2011–2016	Fresno Fuego	41	(0)
2016–2019	Sacramento Republic	50	(1)
2019	→ Hartford Athletic (loan)	8	(0)
2022	Central Valley Fuego FC 2	3	(0)
- * Club domestic league appearances and goals as of October 21, 2019

Elliott Hord (born August 13, 1991) is an American soccer player.

== Career ==
He signed for Sacramento Republic FC from Fresno Fuego in August 2016.

He made his professional debut versus Orange County Blues in August 2016 during the 2016 USL season.

On August 17, 2019, Hord was loaned to USL side Hartford Athletic for the remainder of the season.
