= 2019 Columbus Crew SC season =

Columbus Crew SC
2019 season
- Investor-operators: Dee Haslam; Jimmy Haslam; JW Johnson; Whitney Johnson; Dr. Pete Edwards
- Head coach: Caleb Porter
- Stadium: MAPFRE Stadium
- Major League Soccer: Conference: 10th Overall: 20th
- MLS Cup playoffs: Did not qualify
- U.S. Open Cup: Round of 16
- Top goalscorer: League: Gyasi Zardes (13); All: Gyasi Zardes (13)
- Highest home attendance: 20,865 (8/10 v. CIN)
- Lowest home attendance: 5,202 (6/11 v. PIT)
- Average home league attendance: 14,856 (74.4%)
- Biggest win: NE 0–2 CLB (3/9); CLB 2–0 ATL (3/30); CLB 3–1 LA (5/8); CIN 1–3 CLB (8/25); ATL 1–3 CLB (9/14); CLB 2–0 PHI (9/29)
- Biggest defeat: PHI 3–0 CLB (3/23); CLB 0–3 LAFC (5/11)
Home colors	Away colors

The 2019 Columbus Crew SC season was the club's 24th season of existence and their 24th consecutive season in Major League Soccer, the top flight of soccer in the United States and Canada. The first match of the season was on March 2 against New York Red Bulls. It was the first season under head coach Caleb Porter.

== Roster ==
As of match played October 6, 2019

Note: Flags indicate national team as defined under FIFA eligibility rules; some limited exceptions apply. Players may hold more than one non-FIFA nationality.

No.	Pos.	Nation	Player
1	GK	CUW	Eloy Room (INT)
2	MF	USA	Luis Argudo (SUP)
3	DF	USA	Josh Williams
4	DF	GHA	Jonathan Mensah
5	FW	CAN	Jordan Hamilton
6	MF	USA	Wil Trapp (Captain; HGP)
7	MF	POR	Pedro Santos (INT; DP)
8	MF	BRA	Artur
9	MF	CRC	David Guzmán
10	FW	ARG	Federico Higuaín (DP)
11	FW	USA	Gyasi Zardes (DP)
12	GK	USA	Ben Lundgaard (SUP)
13	MF	USA	Ricardo Clark
14	DF	CRC	Waylon Francis

No.	Pos.	Nation	Player
16	MF	USA	Hector Jiménez
17	FW	JAM	Romario Williams
18	MF	CRC	Luis Díaz (INT; YDP)
19	DF	ARG	Milton Valenzuela (INT)
20	MF	ARG	Eduardo Sosa (INT)
21	DF	USA	Alex Crognale (HGP; SUP)
24	GK	USA	Jon Kempin (SUP)
25	DF	GHA	Harrison Afful
27	FW	USA	Edward Opoku (SUP; GA)
29	DF	GHA	David Accam
30	DF	USA	Aboubacar Keita (HGP; SUP)
31	DF	USA	Connor Maloney (SUP)
33	FW	USA	JJ Williams (SUP)
34	MF	MAR	Youness Mokhtar (INT)

=== Out on loan ===
Note: Flags indicate national team as defined under FIFA eligibility rules; some limited exceptions apply. Players may hold more than one non-FIFA nationality.

No.	Pos.	Nation	Player
17	DF	GHA	Lalas Abubakar (on loan to Colorado Rapids)
-	DF	SCO	Chris Cadden (on loan to Oxford United)

== Technical Staff ==
Position	Staff
President & General Manager	(United States) Tim Bezbatchenko
Executive Vice President, Chief Business Officer	(United States) Steve Lyons
Head Coach	(United States) Caleb Porter
Technical Director	(Canada) Pat Onstad
Director of Player Personnel and Strategy	(France) Issa Tall
Director of Scouting	(Scotland) Neil McGuinness
Assistant Coach	(Saint Vincent and the Grenadines) Ezra Hendrickson
Assistant Coach	(United States) Matt Reis
Assistant Coach	(Uruguay) Pablo Moreira
Assistant Coach	(United States) Ben Cross
Director of Team Operations	(United States) Zach Crusse
Video Performance Analyst	(Netherlands) David Handgraaf
Head Equipment Manager	(United States) David Brauzer
Strength & Conditioning Coach	(United States) Brook Hamilton
Fitness Coach	(Portugal) Federico Pizzuto
Assistant Strength & Conditioning Coach	(United States) Kelly Roderick
Data Analyst	(United States) Alex Mysiw
Assistant Equipment Manager	(United States) Ron Meadors
Head Athletic Trainer	(United States) Chris Shenberger
Assistant Trainer	(United States) Daniel Givens
Dietician	(United States) Jay Short
Team Coordinator	(United States) Julio Velasquez

Source: []

== Non-competitive ==
=== Preseason ===
On December 21, 2018, Crew SC officially announced its preseason schedule, with three confirmed matches. The club began preseason by spending two days in Lewis Center, Ohio before traveling to Chula Vista, California, for a week-long training camp. On January 21, Columbus announced the addition of two friendly matches, both taking place while the club trains in California and behind closed doors. Crew SC began their friendlies by playing Japanese club Vissel Kobe to a 0–0 draw, and followed up the draw with a 1–0 victory over Mexican club Tijuana. An ACL tear to Milton Valenzuela ended his 2019 season before it ever started, which caused Crew SC to acquire former player Waylon Francis for cover. The following preseason game, the club beat fellow MLS side Los Angeles FC 4–2. A Jonathan Mensah own goal followed by a Patrick Mullens strike meant that Columbus were deadlocked at halftime, before scoring three goals in the second half – a brace by JJ Williams and a goal by Justin Meram. After another week in Ohio, Columbus traveled to Charleston, South Carolina to play in the Carolina Challenge Cup, where Crew SC would tie the first two games 1–1, coming from behind to tie in both games, with goals scored by Gyasi Zardes and Robinho, respectively. The final match of the Carolina Challenge Cup had Columbus facing off against FC Cincinnati, where Columbus emerged victorious, winning 3–0 off a Zardes brace and Pedro Santos goal, and claiming the Carolina Challenge Cup for the third consecutive season. Casper Sloth joined Crew SC on trial during preseason along with academy player Sebastian Berhalter and unsigned draft pick Justin Donawa.

January 28 Friendly	Columbus Crew SC	0–0	Vissel Kobe	Irvine, CA
10:00 PM EST	Crognale (yellow card)	Report	Wellington (yellow card)	Stadium: Championship Soccer Stadium
Note: Match was played with 35-minute halves.

January 31 Friendly	Columbus Crew SC	1–0	Tijuana	Chula Vista, CA
1:00 PM EST	44'	Report		Stadium: Chula Vista Elite Athlete Training Center; Attendance: 0

February 4 Friendly	Los Angeles FC	2–4	Columbus Crew SC	Los Angeles, CA
5:00 PM EST	Jonathan 6' (o.g.); Nguyen 48'	Report	Mullins 38'; JJ Williams; Meram	Stadium: Banc of California Stadium; Attendance: 0

February 16 Carolina Challenge Cup	Columbus Crew SC	1–1	Chicago Fire	Charleston, SC
5:00 PM EST	Zardes 26'; Trapp (red card) 31'	Report	Mihailovic 16'; Campos (yellow card) 73'	Stadium: MUSC Health Stadium

February 20 Carolina Challenge Cup	Charleston Battery	1–1	Columbus Crew SC	Charleston, SC
5:00 PM EST	Svantesson 26'; Anunga (yellow card) 36'	Report	Robinho 45+2'	Stadium: MUSC Health Stadium

February 23 Carolina Challenge Cup	FC Cincinnati	0–3	Columbus Crew SC	Charleston, SC
5:00 PM EST	Lamah (red card) 29'	Report	Zardes 5', 20'; Jonathan (yellow card) 24'; Pedro Santos 47'	Stadium: MUSC Health Stadium
Note: Columbus finished in 1st place in the Carolina Challenge Cup.

=== Midseason ===
March 3 Friendly	Columbus Crew SC	4–1	Akron Zips	Obetz, OH
	Mullins 26'; Opoku 64'; Williams,	Report	Goal	Stadium: Crew Training Center

== Competitive ==
The 2019 Major League Soccer schedule was released by the league on January 7, 2019

Crew SC's season began with a 1–1 draw at home to the New York Red Bulls on March 2, with a headed goal from Gastón Sauro off of a corner from Federico Higuaín. That goal would be Sauro's first for the club. Robinho would come in to the game in the 79th minute to make his Crew SC debut, while Waylon Francis made his return to the Black and Gold after spending the 2018 season with the Seattle Sounders. The following week led Crew SC to Foxborough to take on the New England Revolution, where Columbus would earn their first road win on the season due in part to two goals by Gyasi Zardes and a penalty save by Zack Steffen, while this loss for the Revolution snapped their 12-game home opener unbeaten streak. On March 16, Columbus would earn their third straight result, a 1–0 win thanks to a Sauro header off of a corner – this time from Pedro Santos. Justin Meram recorded his 200th regular-season appearance for Crew SC in this game as well. Columbus visited Philadelphia on March 23 and suffered a heavy 3–0 defeat as Crew SC had two debuts for the club: Joe Bendik and JJ Williams. The first month of the 2019 season ended on a high note as Crew SC beat Atlanta United 2–0 on a wet evening in Columbus, with Pedro Santos scoring in the second minute Gyasi Zardes scoring in the 39th. This contest would be Harrison Afful's 100th regular-season appearance for Crew SC.

The month of April was turbulent for Columbus as they managed to score just two goals in the entire month. The first was on an April 6 clash at home against the Revolution. A headed goal from Josh Williams from a Higuaín set-piece, as well as a double yellow card by the Revolution's Michael Mancienne gave Crew SC a 1–0 win. The following week, the club were blanked in Montréal on the 13th, and then travelled home for two straight games, a 3–1 loss versus Portland on the 20th, with the loan Columbus goal being scored by Santos via a chip over goalkeeper Jeff Attinella. This was Columbus's first home loss on the year. Crew SC completed their second straight home match with a 1–0 loss midweek versus D.C. United, and subsequently followed that shutout with a second one, a 2–0 loss at Houston.

“Obviously we score a goal, and we all know what happened. It’s a fair goal. 100 percent. Referee gets in the way, referee fouls Acosta. And then the referee goes and looks at the television to bail himself out. I’ve never in my life seen anything like that. Ever.”

— Head coach Caleb Porter after the D.C. United match on May 4, 2019

The first match in May led to similar results as the previous four. while in the nation's capital, Columbus thought they had the game's opening goal from a shot by Pedro Santos, after a turnover from D.C. Untied's Luciano Acosta in which he, Columbus midfielder Wil Trapp and referee Ted Unkel all collided at midfield. The play was called over for review by the video assistant referee, and Ted Unkel reversed the goal citing a foul by Trapp at midfield. D.C. United took the lead when Luciano Acosta capitalized on a deflection from a set piece. Just before halftime, Wayne Rooney converted a penalty in stoppage time following a handball by Wil Trapp. In the 61st minute, Paul Arriola extended D.C. United's lead to 3–0 with a far-post shot. Crew SC pulled one back in the 75th minute when a Robinho corner slipped through goalkeeper Bill Hamid's hands and into the net. in the following match, Crew SC got back to their winning ways, beating an LA Galaxy side at home 3–1, with Zardes, Higuain and Hector Jimenez scoring the goals. This was Jimenez's first goal in over five years. History was also made in this game, as Higuain passed Robert Warzycha for the most assists in the regular season for the Black and Gold, while David Guzmán made his Columbus debut as well. The May 11th clash was against another Los Angeles side - league leaders in Los Angeles FC. A game which saw the Crew SC debut of David Accam was largely forgettable, as Crew SC lost 3–0 at Mapfre Stadium. The following weekend was a shutout loss at Minnesota United, with the only goal of the match coming in the 70th minute from former Crew SC player Ethan Finlay. on May 25, After Columbus came back from two one-goal deficits, the Colorado Rapids secured a 3–2 victory with an 89th-minute goal in Commerce City, Colorado. The Rapids opened the scoring in the 23rd minute when Tommy Smith headed in a Jack Price corner at the near post. Crew SC responded five minutes later with Pedro Santos scoring from his left foot after a headed pass from Héctor Jiménez. Colorado regained the lead in the seventh minute of first-half stoppage time, as Jonathan Lewis's low shot deflected into the near post. In the 54th minute, Columbus equalized again when Federico Higuaín's cross found Gyasi Zardes, who redirected the ball past Tim Howard. The match remained level until the 89th minute, when Colorado's Nicolás Mezquida capitalized on a loose ball from a corner, tucking it into the top-left corner for the game-winner. Injury news befell the team, as Designated Player Federico Higuaín tore his ACL during this game and would miss the remainder of the season.

Beginning in June, the final match before the Gold Cup break, Columbus took on New York City FC at home and scored first, with the goal coming in the 28th minute via a penalty kick taken by Zardes. NYCFC scored second in the 57th minute to tie it up, only for Pedro Santos to net four minutes later to allow Columbus a one-goal lead. Columbus, however, would not hold on to this lead as NYCFC scored in the 76th minute to take one point from Columbus. This game would be the final game for Zack Steffen in Columbus, as he transferred to Manchester City on July 9. After the Gold Cup break and the resumption of league play, Columbus were shut out in back-to-back games at home, first losing 1–0 to Sporting Kansas City, including a red card shown to Harrison Afful, followed by a 2–0 loss to Orlando City.

The club's torrid form continued into July, with Columbus once again getting shut out, this time in Sandy, Utah by Real Salt Lake, 1–0. This game marked the Crew SC debut for homegrown Aboubacar Keita. On July 6, Crew SC scored their first goal in league play in over a month while facing off against the Seattle Sounders. Pedro Santos tucked home a penalty in the 14th minute. Columbus would wind up losing, as Nico Lodeiro scored in the sixth minute of stoppage time to put his club ahead 2–1 and snatch an away victory for the Sounders. Columbus would lose their next game at Orlando City 1–0, and the following game would come from behind to tie Chicago Fire 2–2 thanks to a 90th minute header by debutant Romario Williams. The July 20th affair between the Crew and the Montreal Impact was the first league win for Columbus since May 8. It came with the debut of Eloy Room, as well as the first league goal for David Accam as Columbus beat the Quebecois side 2–1, with Josh Williams scoring the other goal for the Black and Gold. In the following days, there was an announcement of a new player signing in Chris Cadden, who would immediately be loaned to League One side Oxford United until the start of the 2020 MLS season. The following matchday was a second-consecutive victory for Crew SC, including several firsts for players: Luis Argudo scored his first goal, and Pedro Santos scored his first brace for the club as Columbus won 3–2 at New York Red Bulls, marking the first time this season the club has earned three points after conceding the first goal.

=== Overview ===
Competition	First match	Last match	Starting round	Final position	Record							
Competition	First match	Last match	Starting round	Final position	Pld	W	D	L	GF	GA	GD	Win %
Major League Soccer	March 2, 2019	October 6, 2019	Matchday 1	20th	34	10	8	16	39	47	−8	29.41
U.S. Open Cup	June 11, 2019	June 18, 2019	Fourth Round	Round of 16	2	1	0	1	3	2	+1	50.00
Total					36	11	8	17	42	49	−7	30.56

Source: Competitions

=== MLS ===
==== Standings ====
===== Eastern Conference =====
2019 MLS Eastern Conference standings
Pos	Team	Pld	W	L	T	GF	GA	GD	Pts
8	Chicago Fire	34	10	12	12	55	47	+8	42
9	Montreal Impact	34	12	17	5	47	60	−13	41
10	Columbus Crew SC	34	10	16	8	39	47	−8	38
11	Orlando City SC	34	9	15	10	44	52	−8	37
12	FC Cincinnati	34	6	22	6	31	75	−44	24

Source: MLS
Rules for classification: 1) points; 2) total wins; 3) total goal differential; 4) total goals scored; 5) disciplinary points; 6) away goal differential; 7) away goals scored; 8) home goals scored; 9) home goal differential; 10) coin toss or drawing of lots.

===== Overall table =====
2019 MLS regular season standings
Pos	Team	Pld	W	L	T	GF	GA	GD	Pts	
18	Montreal Impact (V)	34	12	17	5	47	60	−13	41	Qualification for the CONCACAF Champions League
19	Houston Dynamo	34	12	18	4	49	59	−10	40	
20	Columbus Crew SC	34	10	16	8	39	47	−8	38	
21	Sporting Kansas City	34	10	16	8	49	67	−18	38	
22	Orlando City SC	34	9	15	10	44	52	−8	37	

Source: MLS
Rules for classification: 1) points; 2) total wins; 3) total goal differential; 4) total goals scored; 5) disciplinary points; 6) away goals scored; 7) away goal differential; 8) coin toss or drawing of lots
(V) Canadian Championship winners

==== Results summary ====
Overall								Home						Away					
Pld	Pts	W	L	T	GF	GA	GD	W	L	T	GF	GA	GD	W	L	T	GF	GA	GD
34	38	10	16	8	39	47	−8	6	6	5	21	22	−1	4	10	3	18	25	−7

Source: MLS standings
Pld = Matches played; Pts = Points; W = Matches won; T = Matches tied; L = Matches lost; GF = Goals for; GA = Goals against; GD = Goal difference

==== Results by round ====
Round	1	2	3	4	5	6	7	8	9	10	11	12	13	14	15	16	17	18	19	20	21	22	23	24	25	26	27	28	29	30	31	32	33	34
Stadium	H	A	H	A	H	H	A	H	H	A	A	H	H	A	A	H	H	H	A	H	A	A	H	A	A	H	H	A	A	H	A	A	H	A
Result	D	W	W	L	W	W	L	L	L	L	L	W	L	L	L	D	L	L	L	L	L	D	W	W	D	D	D	L	W	D	W	D	W	L

Source: Columbus schedule
A = Away; H = Home; W = Win; D = Draw; L = Loss

==== Match results ====
On December 20, 2018, the league announced the home openers for every club. Columbus will make their season debut at MAPFRE Stadium on the opening day of the season, playing host to New York Red Bulls – the team that eliminated Crew SC from the playoffs in 2017. Columbus will also take part in the home-opening matches for two other clubs, with a trip to Gillette Stadium to face New England Revolution on March 9 and a visit to Saputo Stadium to take on Montreal Impact on April 13.

March 2 1	Columbus Crew SC	1–1	New York Red Bulls	Columbus, OH
4:30 PM EST	Harrison (yellow card) 15'; Trapp (yellow card) 31'; Sauro 41'; Pedro Santos (yellow card) 74'; Francis (yellow card) 90+1'	Report	Ivan 6'; Long (yellow card) 27'; Cásseres Jr. (yellow card) 68'	Stadium: MAPFRE Stadium; Attendance: 17,931; Referee: Ted Unkel; Assistant referees: Adam Wienckowski; Brian Dunn; Fourth official: Matthew Franz

March 9 2	New England Revolution	0–2	Columbus Crew SC	Foxborough, MA
2:00 PM EST	Zahibo (yellow card) 35'; Bye (yellow card) 86'	Report	Zardes 26', 90+6'; Trapp (yellow card) 36'; Pedro Santos (yellow card) 77'	Stadium: Gillette Stadium; Attendance: 13,808; Referee: David Gantar; Assistant referees: Oscar Mitchell-Carvalho; Logan Brown; Fourth official: Rubiel Vazquez

March 16 3	Columbus Crew SC	1–0	FC Dallas	Columbus, OH
2:00 PM EDT	Sauro 10'; Francis (yellow card) 90+2'	Report	Acosta (yellow card) 44'	Stadium: MAPFRE Stadium; Attendance: 9,687; Referee: Alex Chilowicz; Assistant referees: Adam Garner; Kevin Klinger; Fourth official: Marcos de Oliveira

March 23 4	Philadelphia Union	3–0	Columbus Crew SC	Chester, PA
7:30 PM EDT	Accam 31', 41'; Ilsinho 48'	Report	Sauro (yellow card) 68'	Stadium: Talen Energy Stadium; Attendance: 15,135; Referee: Ramy Touchan; Assistant referees: Kyle Atkins; Adam Wienckowski; Fourth official: Armando Villarreal

March 30 5	Columbus Crew SC	2–0	Atlanta United FC	Columbus, OH
7:30 PM EDT	Pedro Santos 2'; Zardes 39'	Report	Nagbe (yellow card) 31'; Ambrose (yellow card) 64'	Stadium: MAPFRE Stadium; Attendance: 10,973; Referee: Joe Dickerson; Assistant referees: Nick Uranga; T.J. Zablocki; Fourth official: Malik Badawi

April 6 6	Columbus Crew SC	1–0	New England Revolution	Columbus, OH
7:30 PM EDT	Jonathan (yellow card) 20'; Jo. Williams 42'; Higuaín (yellow card) 54'	Report	Mancienne (yellow card) 9' (yellow-red card) 64'; Agudelo (yellow card) 45+1'	Stadium: MAPFRE Stadium; Attendance: 10,942; Referee: Rubiel Vazquez; Assistant referees: Ian Anderson; Andrew Bigelow; Fourth official: Ismir Pekmic

April 13 7	Montreal Impact	1–0	Columbus Crew SC	Montreal, QC
1:00 PM EDT	Novillo 55'	Report	Jonathan (yellow card) 90+4'	Stadium: Stade Saputo; Attendance: 18,634; Referee: Armando Villarreal; Assistant referees: Jason White; Gianni Facchini; Fourth official: Fotis Bazakos

April 20 8	Columbus Crew SC	1–3	Portland Timbers	Columbus, OH
7:30 PM EDT	Pedro Santos 69'	Report	Valentin (yellow card) 25'; Mabiala 31'; Ebobisse 35'; Conechny (yellow card) 78'; Blanco (yellow card) 89'; Moreira 90+1'	Stadium: MAPFRE Stadium; Attendance: 11,707; Referee: Chris Penso; Assistant referees: Kathryn Nesbitt; Kyle Longville; Fourth official: Lorant Varga

April 24 9	Columbus Crew SC	0–1	D.C. United	Columbus, OH
7:30 PM EDT	Jo. Williams (yellow card) 25'; Jiménez (yellow card) 69'	Report	Birnbaum (yellow card) 4'; Rooney 27'; Rodríguez (yellow card) 80'	Stadium: MAPFRE Stadium; Attendance: 10,169; Referee: Ismail Elfath; Assistant referees: Kyle Atkins; Brian Dunn; Fourth official: Baldomero Toledo

April 27 10	Houston Dynamo	2–0	Columbus Crew SC	Houston, TX
8:30 PM EDT	Manotas 3'; Martínez 55'	Report	Francis (yellow card) 51'	Stadium: BBVA Compass Stadium; Attendance: 15,557; Referee: Allen Chapman; Assistant referees: Jeremy Hanson; Jeremy Kieso; Fourth official: Rosendo Mendoza

May 4 11	D.C. United	3–1	Columbus Crew SC	Washington, D.C.
8:00 PM EDT	Acosta 27'; Rooney 45+4' (pen.); Moreno (yellow card) 53'; Arriola 61'	Report	Trapp (yellow card) 26'; Higuaín (yellow card) 45+4'; Hamid 75' (o.g.)	Stadium: Audi Field; Attendance: 16,687; Referee: Ted Unkel; Assistant referees: Philippe Brière; Felisha Mariscal; Fourth official: Mark Allatin

May 8 12	Columbus Crew SC	3–1	LA Galaxy	Columbus, OH
7:30 PM EDT	Zardes 27'; Higuaín 53'; Steffen (yellow card) 61'; Jiménez 66'	Report	Antuna (yellow card) 59'; Polenta (yellow card) 80'; Steres 87'	Stadium: MAPFRE Stadium; Attendance: 13,207; Referee: Rubiel Vazquez; Assistant referees: Andrew Bigelow; Gjovalin Bori; Fourth official: Jon Freemon

May 11 13	Columbus Crew SC	0–3	Los Angeles FC	Columbus, OH
7:30 PM EDT	Trapp (yellow card) 27'; D. Guzmán (yellow card) 43'; Pedro Santos (yellow card) 54'	Report	Zimmerman (yellow card) 28'; Kaye 37'; Diomande 88'; Vela 90'	Stadium: MAPFRE Stadium; Attendance: 18,048; Referee: Nima Saghafi; Assistant referees: Adam Garner; Jeff Hosking; Fourth official: Sergii Demianchuk

May 18 14	Minnesota United FC	1–0	Columbus Crew SC	Saint Paul, MN
8:00 PM EDT	Kallman (yellow card) 52'; Ibarra (yellow card) 63'; Finlay 70'	Report	D. Guzmán (yellow card) 62'	Stadium: Allianz Field; Attendance: 19,600; Referee: David Gantar; Assistant referees: Brian Poeschel; Kyle Longville; Fourth official: Baldomero Toledo

May 25 15	Colorado Rapids	3–2	Columbus Crew SC	Commerce City, CO
9:00 PM EDT	Smith 23'; Lewis 45+7'; Price (yellow card) 56'; Mezquida 89', (yellow card) 90'	Report	Pedro Santos 28'; Sauro (yellow card) 50'; Zardes 54'; Hansen (yellow card) 85'	Stadium: Dick's Sporting Goods Park; Attendance: 16,843; Referee: Baldomero Toledo; Assistant referees: Matt Nelson; Eduardo Mariscal; Fourth official: Guido Gonzalez Jr.

June 1 16	Columbus Crew SC	2–2	New York City FC	Columbus, OH
7:30 PM EDT	Zardes 28' (pen.); D. Guzmán (yellow card) 34'; Pedro Santos 61'; Sauro (yellow card) 72'; Jonathan (yellow card) 90+2'	Report	Moralez (yellow card) 14'; Héber 57'; Castellanos 76', (yellow card) 85'	Stadium: MAPFRE Stadium; Attendance: 13,704; Referee: Joe Dickerson; Assistant referees: Jeremy Hanson; Jose Da Silva; Fourth official: Rubiel Vazquez

June 23 17	Columbus Crew SC	0–1	Sporting Kansas City	Columbus, OH
5:30 PM EDT	Harrison (red card) 74'; Crognale (yellow card) 76'; Sauro (yellow card) 79'	Report	Besler (yellow card) 45+1'; Gutiérrez 48'; Zusi (yellow card) 69'	Stadium: MAPFRE Stadium; Attendance: 14,015; Referee: Allen Chapman; Assistant referees: Corey Rockwell; Nick Uranga; Fourth official: David Gantar

June 29 18	Columbus Crew SC	0–2	Orlando City SC	Columbus, OH
7:30 PM EDT	Crognale (yellow card) 82'	Report	Smith (yellow card) 15'; Mueller 41'; Kljestan (yellow card) 63'; Akindele 66'; Ascues (yellow card) 87'	Stadium: MAPFRE Stadium; Attendance: 17,715; Referee: Rubiel Vazquez; Assistant referees: Andrew Bigelow; Logan Brown; Fourth official: Luis Guardia

July 3 19	Real Salt Lake	1–0	Columbus Crew SC	Sandy, UT
10:00 PM EDT	Herrera (yellow card) 31'; Johnson 38'; Baird (yellow card) 55'; Besler (yellow card) 62'; Saucedo (yellow card) 80'	Report	Sosa (yellow card) 32'; Crognale (yellow card) 85'	Stadium: Rio Tinto Stadium; Attendance: 19,030; Referee: Victor Rivas; Assistant referees: Jason White; Cory Richardson; Fourth official: Fotis Bazakos

July 6 20	Columbus Crew SC	1–2	Seattle Sounders FC	Columbus, OH
7:30 PM EDT	Pedro Santos 13' (pen.), (yellow card) 42'; D. Guzmán (yellow card) 29'; Artur (yellow card) 79'; Harrison (yellow card) 85'; Argudo (yellow card) 90+3'	Report	Lodeiro 56' (pen.), 90+6', (yellow card) 85'; Leyva (yellow card) 70'	Stadium: MAPFRE Stadium; Attendance: 14,183; Referee: Chris Penso; Assistant referees: Jeffrey Greeson; Eric Boria; Fourth official: Marcos de Oliveira

July 13 21	Orlando City SC	1–0	Columbus Crew SC	Orlando, FL
7:30 PM EDT	Miller (yellow card) 56'; Sané (yellow card) 58'; Ascues (yellow card) 81'; Michel 84'; Méndez (yellow card) 90+2'; Dwyer (red card) 90+3'	Report		Stadium: Exploria Stadium; Attendance: 22,397; Referee: David Gantar; Assistant referees: Kyle Longville; Elvis Osmanovic; Fourth official: Richard Gamache

July 17 22	Chicago Fire	2–2	Columbus Crew SC	Bridgeview, IL
9:00 PM EDT	Mihailovic 28'; Schweinsteiger (yellow card) 52'; Sapong 63'	Report	Zardes 47'; R. Williams 90'	Stadium: SeatGeek Stadium; Attendance: 7,482; Referee: Armando Villarreal; Assistant referees: Brian Poeschel; Jose Da Silva; Fourth official: Lorant Varga

July 20 23	Columbus Crew SC	2–1	Montreal Impact	Columbus, OH
7:30 PM EDT	J. Williams 6', (yellow card) 53'; Artur (yellow card) 17'; Accam 46'	Report	Diallo 45+2'; Sagna (red card) 55'; Browne (yellow card) 90+6'	Stadium: MAPFRE Stadium; Attendance: 15,124; Referee: Robert Sibiga; Assistant referees: C.J. Morgante; Mike Kampmeinert; Fourth official: Greg Dopka

July 27 24	New York Red Bulls	2–3	Columbus Crew SC	Harrison, NJ
7:30 PM EDT	White 15'; Royer 63' (pen.); Parker (yellow card) 90+2'	Report	Argudo 16'; Pedro Santos 46', 84'; L. Díaz (yellow card) 60'; D. Guzmán (yellow card) 71'	Stadium: Red Bull Arena; Attendance: 16,126; Referee: Fotis Bazakos; Assistant referees: Kathryn Nesbitt; Adam Garner; Fourth official: Michael Radchuk

August 3 25	San Jose Earthquakes	1–1	Columbus Crew SC	San Jose, CA
10:00 PM EDT	Eriksson 41' (pen.), (yellow card) 83'	Report	Zardes 65'; Accam (yellow card) 75'	Stadium: Avaya Stadium; Attendance: 17,088; Referee: Alex Chilowicz; Assistant referees: Eduardo Mariscal; T.J. Zablocki; Fourth official: Elton Garcia

August 10 26	Columbus Crew SC	2–2	FC Cincinnati	Columbus, OH
7:30 PM EDT	Crognale (yellow card) 18'; Zardes 45' (pen.); Pedro Santos 62', (yellow card) 68'	Report	Mattocks 16'; Ledesma 23'; van der Werff (yellow card) 72'; Cruz (yellow card) 90+4'; Ulloa (yellow card) 90+7'	Stadium: MAPFRE Stadium; Attendance: 20,865; Referee: Silviu Petrescu; Assistant referees: Gianni Facchini; Philippe Brière; Fourth official: Thomas Snyder

August 17 27	Columbus Crew SC	2–2	Toronto FC	Columbus, OH
7:30 PM EDT	Pedro Santos 48'; Accam 82'; Jonathan (yellow card) 90+2'	Report	Osorio 42'; Altidore 90'	Stadium: MAPFRE Stadium; Attendance: 17,494; Referee: Ramy Touchan; Assistant referees: Ian Anderson; Matt Nelson; Fourth official: Rubiel Vazquez

August 21 28	New York City FC	1–0	Columbus Crew SC	New York, NY
7:00 PM EDT	Castellanos 36'; Matarrita (yellow card) 80'	Report	D. Guzmán (yellow card) 12'; Jonathan (yellow card) 49'; Room (yellow card) 64'; Crognale (yellow card) 68'	Stadium: Yankee Stadium; Attendance: 19,828; Referee: Allen Chapman; Assistant referees: Brian Dunn; Nick Uranga; Fourth official: Lorant Varga

August 25 29	FC Cincinnati	1–3	Columbus Crew SC	Cincinnati, OH
6:00 PM EDT	Gutman (yellow card) 23'; van der Werff (yellow card) 31'; Deplagne (yellow card) 57'; Manneh 89'; Ulloa (yellow card) 90+1'; Ledesma (yellow card) 90+5'	Report	Zardes 22', 33'; Maloney (yellow card) 31'; Harrison (yellow card) 43'; L. Díaz 45+1'; Artur (yellow card) 62'; Jonathan (yellow card) 90+1'	Stadium: Nippert Stadium; Attendance: 30,611; Referee: Timothy Ford; Assistant referees: Adam Wienckowski; Kevin Klinger; Fourth official: Elvis Osmanovic

August 31 30	Columbus Crew SC	1–1	Chicago Fire	Columbus, OH
7:30 PM EDT	Pedro Santos 27'	Report	Bornstein (yellow card) 46'; Calvo (yellow card) 48'; Schweinsteiger (yellow card) 82'; Frankowski 90+4'	Stadium: MAPFRE Stadium; Attendance: 16,438; Referee: Drew Fischer; Assistant referees: Jason White; Oscar Mitchell-Carvalho; Fourth official: Yusri Rudolf

September 14 31	Atlanta United FC	1–3	Columbus Crew SC	Atlanta, GA
7:00 PM EDT	J. Martínez 19'; Remedi (yellow card) 66'; Gressel (yellow card) 88'	Report	Artur (yellow card) 39'; Zardes 53'; L. Díaz 60'; Robinson 85' (o.g.); Pedro Santos (yellow card) 90'	Stadium: Mercedes-Benz Stadium; Attendance: 68,046; Referee: Alan Kelly; Assistant referees: Logan Brown; Eric Weisbrod; Fourth official: Ismail Elfath

September 21 32	Vancouver Whitecaps FC	1–1	Columbus Crew SC	Vancouver, BC
5:00 PM EDT	MacMath (yellow card) 17'; Ricketts (yellow card) 35'; Adnan (yellow card) 45+1'; Montero 90+4'	Report	Zardes 18' (pen.)	Stadium: BC Place; Attendance: 16,683; Referee: Alex Chilowicz; Assistant referees: Eduardo Mariscal; Micheal Barwegen; Fourth official: Tim Ford

September 29 33	Columbus Crew SC	2–0	Philadelphia Union	Columbus, OH
5:00 PM EDT	Trapp (yellow card) 55'; Mokhtar 69', (yellow card) 80'; Pedro Santos 73'	Report	Jamiro (yellow card) 13'; Przybyłko (yellow card) 90+1'	Stadium: MAPFRE Stadium; Attendance: 20,353; Referee: Rubiel Vazquez; Assistant referees: Jason White; Benjamin Hall-Volpenhein; Fourth official: Marcos de Oliveira

October 6 34	Toronto FC	1–0	Columbus Crew SC	Toronto, ON
4:00 PM EDT	Bradley (yellow card) 39'; Pozuelo 58'; Delgado (yellow card) 76'	Report	Pedro Santos (yellow card) 32'	Stadium: BMO Field; Attendance: 23,692; Referee: Armando Villarreal; Assistant referees: Jeffrey Greeson; Ian McKay; Fourth official: David Barrie

=== MLS Cup Playoffs ===
The Columbus Crew failed to qualify for the playoffs in this season.

=== U.S. Open Cup ===
June 11 Fourth Round	Columbus Crew SC (MLS) (Ohio)	1–0	(Pennsylvania) Pittsburgh Riverhounds SC (USLC)	Columbus, OH
7:00 PM EDT	Accam 55'	Report		Stadium: MAPFRE Stadium; Attendance: 5,202; Referee: Matthew Franz; Assistant referees: Jeffrey Swartzel; James Duling; Fourth official: Kevin Fikar

June 18 Round of 16	Columbus Crew SC (MLS) (Ohio)	2–3	(Georgia (U.S. state)) Atlanta United FC (MLS)	Columbus, OH
7:00 PM EDT	Accam 40'; Mullins (yellow card) 42'; Crognale (yellow card) 51'; Harrison (yellow card) 67'; Guzan 71' (o.g.); D. Guzmán (yellow card) 86'	Report	Vazquez 5', 65'; Robinson 14'; Meram (yellow card) 19'; González Pírez (yellow card) 52'; Barco (yellow card) 90+3'	Stadium: MAPFRE Stadium; Attendance: 8,659; Referee: Guido Gonzalez Jr. Assistant referees: Ian McKay; Tom Felice; Fourth official: James Duling

== Statistics ==
=== Appearances and goals ===
Federico Higuaín entered the season with 196 career appearances for Crew SC, good for eighth place all-time, and 58 goals for the club, good for third place. In order to move up the charts in each category, he needed to appear in four matches and score 17 goals. He appeared for the fourth time on the season on March 23, moving up the charts in the Crew's defeat against Philadelphia Union.

Justin Meram also came into the 2019 season sitting in the top ten in club history in both appearances and goals: his 225 appearances were good for fifth place in club history, and his 43 goals were good for sixth. In order to move up, Meram needed to play in 17 games and score 10 goals. He was traded on May 7, however, after playing just nine matches without scoring, departing without moving up in either category.

Club captain Wil Trapp was tenth place in club history in appearances coming into the season, with 177 games played for the Crew. In order to move up, he needed to appear at least 11 times in all competitions. Trapp made his 11th appearance on May 8, starting in the club's victory against LA Galaxy.

No.	Pos	Nat	Player	Total		MLS		U.S. Open Cup	
No.	Pos	Nat	Player	Apps	Goals	Apps	Goals	Apps	Goals
1	GK	(Curaçao) CUW	Eloy Room	12	0	12+0	0	0+0	0
2	MF	(United States) USA	Luis Argudo	23	1	10+11	1	1+1	0
3	DF	(United States) USA	Josh Williams	16	2	15+1	2	0+0	0
4	DF	(Ghana) GHA	Jonathan Mensah	24	0	23+1	0	0+0	0
5	FW	(Canada) CAN	Jordan Hamilton	4	0	0+4	0	0+0	0
6	MF	(United States) USA	Wil Trapp	28	0	26+2	0	0+0	0
7	MF	(Portugal) POR	Pedro Santos	35	11	30+3	11	2+0	0
8	MF	(Brazil) BRA	Artur	32	0	28+2	0	2+0	0
9	MF	(Costa Rica) CRC	David Guzmán	18	0	13+3	0	2+0	0
10	MF	(Argentina) ARG	Federico Higuaín	14	1	13+1	1	0+0	0
11	FW	(United States) USA	Gyasi Zardes	28	13	28+0	13	0+0	0
12	GK	(United States) USA	Ben Lundgaard	0	0	0+0	0	0+0	0
13	MF	(United States) USA	Ricardo Clark	7	0	4+3	0	0+0	0
14	DF	(Costa Rica) CRC	Waylon Francis	18	0	16+1	0	0+1	0
16	MF	(United States) USA	Hector Jiménez	25	1	19+4	1	2+0	0
17	FW	(Jamaica) JAM	Romario Williams	7	1	1+6	1	0+0	0
17	DF	(Ghana) GHA	Lalas Abubakar	1	0	1+0	0	0+0	0
18	MF	(Costa Rica) CRC	Luis Díaz	13	2	9+4	2	0+0	0
19	DF	(Argentina) ARG	Milton Valenzuela	0	0	0+0	0	0+0	0
20	MF	(Venezuela) VEN	Eduardo Sosa	8	0	4+4	0	0+0	0
21	DF	(United States) USA	Alex Crognale	14	0	9+3	0	2+0	0
24	GK	(United States) USA	Jon Kempin	5	0	3+0	0	2+0	0
25	DF	(Ghana) GHA	Harrison Afful	24	0	22+0	0	2+0	0
27	MF	(Ghana) GHA	Edward Opoku	0	0	0+0	0	0+0	0
29	MF	(Ghana) GHA	David Accam	17	4	8+7	2	2+0	2
30	DF	(United States) USA	Aboubacar Keita	10	0	8+2	0	0+0	0
31	DF	(United States) USA	Connor Maloney	11	0	9+1	0	0+1	0
33	FW	(United States) USA	JJ Williams	9	0	3+4	0	0+2	0
34	MF	(Morocco) MAR	Youness Mokhtar	8	1	5+3	1	0+0	0
-	DF	(Scotland) SCO	Chris Cadden	0	0	0+0	0	0+0	0
			Own goal	0	3	-	2	-	1
Players who left Columbus during the season:
1	GK	(United States) USA	Joe Bendik	6	0	6+0	0	0+0	0
9	MF	(Iraq) IRQ	Justin Meram	9	0	4+5	0	0+0	0
18	MF	(Brazil) BRA	Robinho	21	0	13+6	0	1+1	0
22	DF	(Argentina) ARG	Gastón Sauro	17	2	15+0	2	2+0	0
23	GK	(United States) USA	Zack Steffen	13	0	13+0	0	0+0	0
28	MF	(Denmark) DEN	Niko Hansen	9	0	2+7	0	0+0	0
32	FW	(United States) USA	Patrick Mullins	11	0	2+7	0	2+0	0

Source: Columbus stats

=== Disciplinary record ===
No.	Pos.	Name	MLS		U.S. Open Cup		Total	
No.	Pos.	Name	Yellow card	Red card	Yellow card	Red card	Yellow card	Red card
1	GK	(Curaçao) Eloy Room	1	0	0	0	1	0
2	MF	(United States) Luis Argudo	1	0	0	0	1	0
3	DF	(United States) Josh Williams	2	0	0	0	2	0
4	DF	(Ghana) Jonathan Mensah	6	0	0	0	6	0
5	FW	(Canada) Jordan Hamilton	0	0	0	0	0	0
6	MF	(United States) Wil Trapp	5	0	0	0	5	0
7	MF	(Portugal) Pedro Santos	7	0	0	0	7	0
8	MF	(Brazil) Artur	4	0	0	0	4	0
9	MF	(Costa Rica) David Guzmán	6	0	1	0	7	0
10	MF	(Argentina) Federico Higuaín	2	0	0	0	2	0
11	FW	(United States) Gyasi Zardes	0	0	0	0	0	0
12	GK	(United States) Ben Lundgaard	0	0	0	0	0	0
13	MF	(United States) Ricardo Clark	0	0	0	0	0	0
14	DF	(Costa Rica) Waylon Francis	3	0	0	0	3	0
16	MF	(United States) Hector Jiménez	1	0	0	0	1	0
17	FW	(Jamaica) Romario Williams	0	0	0	0	0	0
17	DF	(Ghana) Lalas Abubakar	0	0	0	0	0	0
18	MF	(Costa Rica) Luis Díaz	1	0	0	0	1	0
19	DF	(Argentina) Milton Valenzuela	0	0	0	0	0	0
20	MF	(Venezuela) Eduardo Sosa	1	0	0	0	1	0
21	DF	(United States) Alex Crognale	5	0	1	0	6	0
24	GK	(United States) Jon Kempin	0	0	0	0	0	0
25	DF	(Ghana) Harrison Afful	3	1	1	0	4	1
27	MF	(Ghana) Edward Opoku	0	0	0	0	0	0
29	MF	(Ghana) David Accam	1	0	0	0	1	0
30	DF	(United States) Aboubacar Keita	0	0	0	0	0	0
31	DF	(United States) Connor Maloney	1	0	0	0	1	0
33	MF	(United States) JJ Williams	0	0	0	0	0	0
34	MF	(Morocco) Youness Mokhtar	1	0	0	0	1	0
-	DF	(Scotland) Chris Cadden	0	0	0	0	0	0
Players who left Columbus during the season:
1	GK	(United States) Joe Bendik	0	0	0	0	0	0
9	MF	(Iraq) Justin Meram	0	0	0	0	0	0
18	MF	(Brazil) Robinho	0	0	0	0	0	0
22	DF	(Argentina) Gastón Sauro	4	0	0	0	4	0
23	GK	(United States) Zack Steffen	1	0	0	0	1	0
28	MF	(Denmark) Niko Hansen	1	0	0	0	1	0
32	FW	(United States) Patrick Mullins	0	0	1	0	1	0

Source: Columbus stats

=== Clean sheets ===
Zack Steffen came into the season with the fifth-most shutouts in club history, keeping 22 through his first three seasons with the club. In order to move up on the all-time charts, he needed to keep two clean sheets in 2019. Steffen accomplished that mark in just three matches, moving up the chart following a clean sheet against FC Dallas on March 16.

No.	Name	MLS	U.S. Open Cup	Total	Games Played		
No.	Name	1	(Curaçao) Eloy Room	1	0	1	12
12	(United States) Ben Lundgaard	0	0	0	0		
24	(United States) Jon Kempin	0	1	1	5		
Players who left Columbus during the season:
1	(United States) Joe Bendik	0	0	0	6		
23	(United States) Zack Steffen	4	0	4	13		

Source: Columbus stats

== Transfers ==
=== In ===
Pos.	Player	Transferred from	Fee/notes	Date	Source
FW	(United States) JJ Williams	(United States) Kentucky Wildcats	Drafted in the First Round of the 2019 MLS SuperDraft. Signed as a Generation Adidas player.	January 11, 2019	
MF	(United States) Ricardo Clark	(United States) Columbus Crew SC	Signed a new contract	January 17, 2019	
MF	(Brazil) Robinho	(Brazil) Ceará	Transfer, terms undisclosed	January 18, 2019	
DF	(United States) Aboubacar Keita	(United States) Virginia Cavaliers	Signed as a Homegrown Player	January 22, 2019	
DF	(Costa Rica) Waylon Francis	(United States) Seattle Sounders FC	Traded for $50,000 in general allocation money	February 5, 2019	
MF	(Costa Rica) David Guzmán	(United States) Portland Timbers	Traded for a 2019 international roster slot	May 7, 2019	
MF	(Ghana) David Accam	(United States) Philadelphia Union	Traded for $100,000 in targeted allocation money, $400,000 in general allocation money and a 2019 international roster slot	May 8, 2019	
FW	(Jamaica) Romario Williams	(United States) Atlanta United FC	Traded for $100,000 in general allocation money	July 1, 2019	
MF	(Costa Rica) Luis Díaz	(Costa Rica) C.S. Herediano	Transfer, $1,000,000. Signed as a Young Designated Player.	July 2, 2019	
GK	(Curaçao) Eloy Room	(Netherlands) PSV Eindhoven	Signed as a free agent	July 5, 2019	
FW	(Canada) Jordan Hamilton	(Canada) Toronto FC	Traded for Patrick Mullins, $50,000 in targeted allocation money, and right of first refusal for an unnamed player	July 11, 2019	
MF	(Morocco) Youness Mokhtar	(Norway) Stabæk Fotball	Signed as a free agent	July 19, 2019	
DF	(Scotland) Chris Cadden	(Scotland) Motherwell F.C.	Signed as a free agent, then loaned	July 23, 2019	
DF	(Ghana) Harrison Afful	(United States) Columbus Crew SC	Signed a new contract	October 30, 2019	
MF	(United States) Darlington Nagbe	(United States) Atlanta United FC	Traded for $700,000 in targeted allocation money, $150,000 in general allocation money, a 2020 international roster slot, and $200,000 in 2021 targeted allocation money if certain performance conditions are met.	November 13, 2019	
MF	(Sweden) Axel Sjöberg	(United States) Colorado Rapids	Claimed off waivers	December 4, 2019	
GK	(United States) Matt Lampson	(United States) LA Galaxy	Signed as free agent	December 12, 2019	
DF	(Netherlands) Vito Wormgoor	(Norway) SK Brann	Signed as free agent	December 18, 2019	
MF	(Armenia) Lucas Zelarayán	(Mexico) Tigres UANL	Transfer, $7,000,000. Acquired as a designated player.	December 19, 2019	

=== Out ===
Pos.	Player	Transferred to	Fee/notes	Date	Source
MF	(Iraq) Justin Meram	(United States) Atlanta United FC	Traded for $100,000 in general allocation money, and a second round draft pick in the 2020 MLS SuperDraft. If Atlanta transfer Meram to a club outside of MLS, Columbus will retain a percentage of the transfer fee.	May 7, 2019	
GK	(United States) Zack Steffen	(England) Manchester City	Transfer, £7,000,000	July 9, 2019	
MF	(Brazil) Robinho	(United States) Orlando City SC	Traded for $50,000 in 2019 targeted allocation money. Should certain performance conditions be met Columbus will also receive $50,000 in 2019 targeted allocation money and $50,000 in 2020 general allocation money	July 11, 2019	
FW	(United States) Patrick Mullins	(Canada) Toronto FC	Traded with $50,000 in targeted allocation money, and right of first refusal for an unnamed player for Jordan Hamilton	July 11, 2019	
GK	(United States) Joe Bendik	(United States) Philadelphia Union	Traded for a second round draft pick in the 2020 MLS SuperDraft. If certain performance conditions are met, Columbus will receive $50,000 in general allocation money	July 19, 2019	
DF	(Argentina) Gastón Sauro	(Mexico) Deportivo Toluca F.C.	Transfer, terms undisclosed	August 7, 2019	
MF	(Denmark) Niko Hansen	(United States) Houston Dynamo	Traded for $75,000 in targeted allocation money	August 8, 2019	
GK	(United States) Ben Lundgaard	(United States) Atlanta United 2	Option Declined	October 21, 2019	
CB	(United States) Alex Crognale	(United States) Birmingham Legion	Option Declined	October 21, 2019	
DM	(Costa Rica) David Guzman	(Costa Rica) Saprissa	Option Declined	October 21, 2019	
MF	(Ghana) Edward Opoku	Retired	Option Declined	October 21, 2019	
MF	(Venezuela) Eduardo Sosa	(United States) Fort Lauderdale CF	Option Declined	October 21, 2019	
DF	(Ghana) Harrison Afful	(United States) Columbus Crew SC	Contract expired	October 21, 2019	
MF	(United States) Ricardo Clark	Retired	Contract expired	October 21, 2019	
MF	(Argentina) Federico Higuain	(United States) D.C. United	Contract expired	October 21, 2019	
FW	(Jamaica) Romario Williams	(United States) Miami FC	Contract expired	October 21, 2019	
MF	(United States) Luis Argudo	(United States) Inter Miami CF	Selected in the 2019 MLS Expansion Draft. Columbus receives $50,000 in general allocation money	November 19, 2019	
DF	(Ghana) Lalas Abubakar	(United States) Colorado Rapids	Traded for $400,000 in 2020 general allocation money and a 2020 international roster slot	November 20, 2019	
MF	(United States) Connor Maloney	(United States) San Antonio FC	Option Declined	November 21, 2020	

=== Loan out ===
Pos.	Player	Loanee club	Length/Notes	Beginning	End	Source
DF	(United States) Aboubacar Keita	(United States) Richmond Kickers	On a match-by-match basis. Columbus retains right to recall at any time.	March 6, 2019	June 23, 2019	
GK	(United States) Ben Lundgaard	(United States) Pittsburgh Riverhounds SC	On a match-by-match basis. Columbus retains right to recall at any time.	March 6, 2019	June 21, 2019	
GK	(United States) Ben Lundgaard	(United States) Pittsburgh Riverhounds SC	On a match-by-match basis. Columbus retains right to recall at any time.	October 7, 2019	November 3, 2019	
DF	(United States) Alex Crognale	(United States) Indy Eleven	On a match-by-match basis. Columbus retains right to recall at any time.	March 15, 2019	May 11, 2019	
MF	(Ghana) Edward Opoku	(United States) Birmingham Legion FC	On a match-by-match basis. Columbus retains right to recall at any time.	March 22, 2019	August 17, 2019	
MF	(United States) Luis Argudo	(United States) Hartford Athletic	On a match-by-match basis. Columbus retains right to recall at any time.	April 11, 2019	April 23, 2019	
GK	(United States) Jon Kempin	(United States) Hartford Athletic	On a match-by-match basis. Columbus retains right to recall at any time.	April 11, 2019	April 23, 2019	
FW	(United States) JJ Williams	(United States) Birmingham Legion	On a match-by-match basis. Columbus retains right to recall at any time.	April 12, 2019	April 20, 2019	
FW	(United States) JJ Williams	(United States) Birmingham Legion	On a match-by-match basis. Columbus retains right to recall at any time.	May 9, 2019	June 23, 2019	
FW	(United States) JJ Williams	(United States) Birmingham Legion	On a match-by-match basis. Columbus retains right to recall at any time.	July 13, 2019	October 26, 2019	
DF	(Ghana) Lalas Abubakar	(United States) Colorado Rapids	Remainder of the 2019 Major League Soccer season. Columbus receives $125,000 in targeted allocation money.	May 8, 2019	End of Season	
DF	(Scotland) Chris Cadden	(England) Oxford United	Remainder of the 2019 Major League Soccer season	Jul 23, 2019	End of Season	

=== MLS Draft picks ===
Draft picks are not automatically signed to the team roster. Only those who are signed to a contract will be listed as transfers in. The picks for Columbus Crew SC are listed below:

2019 Columbus Crew SC SuperDraft Picks
Round	Pick	Player	Position	College
1	18	(United States) JJ Williams	FW	Kentucky
3	66	(Bermuda) Justin Donawa	MF	Dartmouth
3	90	(Brazil) Rafael Mentzingen	MF	Valparaiso

== Awards ==
MLS Team of the Week
Week	Starters	Bench	Opponent(s)	Link
1	(Argentina) Gastón Sauro		(United States) New York Red Bulls	
2	(United States) Caleb Porter (coach) (United States) Gyasi Zardes		(United States) New England Revolution	
3	(Argentina) Gastón Sauro	(United States) Zack Steffen	(United States) FC Dallas	
5		(United States) Zack Steffen	(United States) Atlanta United FC	
6		(United States) Zack Steffen	(United States) New England Revolution	
11		(Argentina) Federico Higuaín	(United States) LA Galaxy (United States) Los Angeles FC	
14	(Portugal) Pedro Santos		(United States) New York City FC	
20		(Ghana) David Accam	(United States) Chicago Fire (Canada) Montreal Impact	
21	(Portugal) Pedro Santos		(United States) New York Red Bulls	
22		(Curaçao) Eloy Room	(United States) San Jose Earthquakes	
23	(Portugal) Pedro Santos		(United States) FC Cincinnati	
25		(United States) Gyasi Zardes	(United States) New York City FC (United States) FC Cincinnati	
28	(Costa Rica) Luis Díaz	(Ghana) Harrison Afful	(United States) Atlanta United FC	
30		(Portugal) Pedro Santos	(United States) Philadelphia Union	

=== 2019 MLS Homegrown Game ===
- DF Aboubacar Keita

=== Crew SC Team Awards ===
- Most Valuable Player – Pedro Santos
- Golden Boot Winner – Gyasi Zardes
- Defender of the Year – Jonathan Mensah
- Kirk Urso Heart Award – Jon Kempin
- Humanitarian of the Year – Luis Argudo
- Academy Player of the Year – JT Harms

== Kits ==
Home	Away	Specialty

Type	Shirt	Shorts	Socks	First appearance / Record
Home	Gold	Gold	Gold	Match 1 vs. NYRB / 8–12–4
Away	Black	Black	Black	Match 3 vs. Dallas / 3–4–4
Specialty	Teal	Teal	Teal	Match 8 vs. Portland / 0–1–0
