= 2020 Inter Miami CF season =

Inter Miami CF
2020 season
- President: David Beckham
- Head coach: Diego Alonso
- Stadium: Inter Miami CF Stadium
- Major League Soccer: Conference: 10th Overall: 19th
- U.S. Open Cup: Canceled
- MLS Cup: Play-in round
- MLS is Back Tournament: Group stage
- Top goalscorer: Lewis Morgan (5 goals)
- Average home league attendance: 2,216
- Biggest win: MIA 3–2 ORL (Aug. 22); ATL 1–2 MIA (Sept. 19)
- Biggest defeat: MIA 1–4 NYRB {Sept. 23); PHI 3–0 MIA (Sept. 27); NSH 3–0 MIA (Nov. 20)
Home colors	Away colors

The 2020 Inter Miami CF season was the first season in the history of Inter Miami CF and the 17th season of first-division club soccer in South Florida. It was the first time since 2001 that a South Florida club competed in the first-division. In addition to playing in Major League Soccer, the club was scheduled to participate in the U.S. Open Cup but the competition was cancelled due to the COVID-19 pandemic.

== Management ==
Position	Staff
Ownership
Lead Managing Owner	(United States) Jorge Mas
President	(England) David Beckham
Chairman	(Bolivia) Marcelo Claure
Co-owner	(United States) Jose Mas
Co-owner	(Japan) Masayoshi Son
Front office
Chief Business Officer	(Mexico) Jurgen Mainka
Sporting Director	(United States) Paul McDonough
Vice President	(United States) Pablo Alvarez
Coaching staff
Head Coach	(Uruguay) Diego Alonso
Assistant Coach	(Wales) Anthony Pulis
Assistant Coach	(Argentina) Claudio Arzeno
Assistant Coach	(Spain) Albert Rudé
Goalkeeper Coach	(Argentina) Sebastián Saja
Fitness Coach	(Uruguay) Mauricio Marchetti
Sports Scientist	(Argentina) Gustavo Metral
Viedo Analyst	(United States) Brett Uttley

Last updated: January 13, 2020
Source: Inter Miami CF

== Squad ==
Squad No.	Name	Nationality	Position	Date of birth (age)	Signed from
Goalkeepers
1	John McCarthy	(United States)	GK	July 4, 1992 (aged 27)	(United States) Tampa Bay Rowdies
27	Drake Callender	(United States)	GK	October 7, 1997 (aged 22)	(United States) San Jose Earthquakes
31	Luis Robles	(United States)	GK	May 11, 1984 (aged 35)	(United States) New York Red Bulls
Defenders
2	Alvas Powell	(Jamaica)	DF	July 14, 1994 (aged 25)	(United States) FC Cincinnati
3	Andrés Reyes	(Colombia)	DF	September 8, 1999 (aged 20)	(Colombia) Atlético Nacional
4	Christian Makoun	(Venezuela)	DF	March 5, 2000 (aged 19)	(Italy) Juventus
5	Nicolás Figal	(Argentina)	DF	April 3, 1994 (aged 25)	(Argentina) Independiente
18	Dylan Nealis	(United States)	DF	July 30, 1998 (aged 21)	(United States) Georgetown University
20	A. J. DeLaGarza	(Guam)	DF	November 4, 1987 (aged 32)	(United States) Houston Dynamo
22	Ben Sweat	(United States)	DF	September 4, 1991 (aged 28)	(United States) New York City FC
26	Leandro González Pírez	(Argentina)	DF	February 26, 1992 (aged 28)	(Mexico) Tijuana
28	Brek Shea	(United States)	DF	February 28, 1990 (aged 30)	(United States) Atlanta United FC
33	Mikey Ambrose	(United States)	DF	October 5, 1993 (aged 26)	(United States) Atlanta United FC
36	Denso Ulysse	(Haiti)	DF	November 20, 1998 (aged 21)	(United States) Tacoma Defiance
Midfielders
6	Wil Trapp	(United States)	MF	January 15, 1993 (aged 27)	(United States) Columbus Crew
7	Lewis Morgan	(Scotland)	MF	September 30, 1996 (aged 23)	(Scotland) Celtic
8	Blaise Matuidi	(France)	MF	April 9, 1987 (aged 32)	(Italy) Juventus
10	Rodolfo Pizarro	(Mexico)	MF	February 15, 1994 (aged 26)	(Mexico) Monterrey
11	Matías Pellegrini	(Argentina)	MF	March 11, 2000 (aged 19)	(Argentina) Estudiantes
13	Víctor Ulloa	(Mexico)	MF	March 4, 1992 (aged 27)	(United States) FC Cincinnati
14	Jay Chapman	(Canada)	MF	January 1, 1994 (aged 26)	(Canada) Toronto FC
15	David Norman	(Canada)	MF	May 31, 1998 (aged 21)	(Canada) Pacific FC
30	George Acosta	(United States)	MF	January 19, 2000 (aged 20)	(United States) Austin Bold
34	Federico Higuaín	(Argentina)	MF	October 25, 1984 (aged 35)	(United States) D.C. United
Forwards
9	Gonzalo Higuaín	(Argentina)	FW	December 10, 1987 (aged 32)	(Italy) Juventus
12	Juan Agudelo	(United States)	FW	November 23, 1992 (aged 27)	(United States) New England Revolution
17	Jerome Kiesewetter	(United States)	FW	February 9, 1993 (aged 27)	(United States) El Paso Locomotive
19	Robbie Robinson	(United States)	FW	December 17, 1998 (aged 21)	(United States) Clemson University
21	Julián Carranza	(Argentina)	FW	May 22, 2000 (aged 19)	(Argentina) Banfield

== Transfers ==
=== Transfers in ===
Date	Position	No.	Name	From	Fee	Ref.
Summer 2019
July 26, 2019	FW	—	(Argentina) Julián Carranza	(Argentina) Banfield	Undisclosed	
July 26, 2019	MF	—	(Argentina) Matías Pellegrini	(Argentina) Estudiantes	Undisclosed	
August 6, 2019	DF	—	(Venezuela) Christian Makoun	(Venezuela) Zamora	Undisclosed	
Winter 2019–20
November 11, 2019	MF	—	(Mexico) Víctor Ulloa	(United States) FC Cincinnati	Trade	
November 13, 2019	MF	—	(Canada) Jay Chapman	(Canada) Toronto FC	$100,000 GAM	
November 14, 2019	DF	—	(United States) Grant Lillard	(United States) Chicago Fire FC	$75,000 GAM	
November 18, 2019	FW	—	(United States) Jerome Kiesewetter	(United States) El Paso Locomotive	Free	
November 19, 2019	DF	—	(United States) Ben Sweat	(United States) New York City FC	Expansion Draft	
November 19, 2019	MF	—	(Jamaica) Alvas Powell	(United States) FC Cincinnati	Expansion Draft	
November 19, 2019	MF	—	(United States) Lee Nguyen	(United States) Los Angeles FC	Expansion Draft	
November 19, 2019	MF	—	(United States) Luis Argudo	(United States) Columbus Crew	Expansion Draft	
November 19, 2019	GK	—	(United States) Bryan Meredith	(United States) Seattle Sounders FC	Expansion Draft	
November 26, 2019	DF	—	(United States) Mikey Ambrose	(United States) Atlanta United FC	Re-Entry Draft	
December 2, 2019	GK	—	(United States) Luis Robles	(United States) New York Red Bulls	Free	
December 2, 2019	DF	—	(Guam) A. J. DeLaGarza	(United States) Houston Dynamo	Free	
December 4, 2019	GK	—	(United States) John McCarthy	(United States) Tampa Bay Rowdies	Free	
December 24, 2019	GK	—	(United States) Drake Callender	(United States) San Jose Earthquakes	Trade	
December 24, 2019	DF	—	(Haiti) Denso Ulysse	(United States) Tacoma Defiance	Free	
December 28, 2019	FW	—	(United States) Juan Agudelo	(Canada) Toronto FC	Trade	
December 29, 2019	DF	—	(Panama) Román Torres	(United States) Seattle Sounders FC	Free	
January 1, 2020	MF	—	(United States) George Acosta	(United States) Austin Bold	Free	
January 1, 2020	MF	—	(Canada) David Norman	(Canada) Pacific FC	Free	
January 9, 2020	FW	—	(United States) Robbie Robinson	(United States) Clemson University	SuperDraft	
January 9, 2020	DF	—	(United States) Dylan Nealis	(United States) Georgetown University	SuperDraft	
January 30, 2020	DF	—	(Argentina) Nicolás Figal	(Argentina) Independiente	Undisclosed	
January 31, 2020	MF	—	(Scotland) Lewis Morgan	(Scotland) Celtic	Undisclosed	
January 31, 2020	MF	—	(United States) Wil Trapp	(United States) Columbus Crew	$100,000 GAM	
February 12, 2020	MF	—	(Colombia) Andrés Reyes	(Colombia) Atlético Nacional	Loan	
February 12, 2020	MF	—	(Bolivia) Jairo Quinteros	(Spain) Valencia CF Academy	Undisclosed	
February 17, 2020	MF	—	(Mexico) Rodolfo Pizarro	(Mexico) C.F. Monterrey	$12,000,000	
Summer 2020
June 25, 2020	DF	—	(United States) Brek Shea	(United States) Atlanta United FC	Free	
July 1, 2020	DF	—	(Argentina) Leandro González Pírez	(Mexico) Tijuana	Undisclosed	
August 10, 2020	MF	—	(France) Blaise Matuidi	(Italy) Juventus	Free	
September 18, 2020	FW	—	(Argentina) Gonzalo Higuaín	(Italy) Juventus	Free	
October 10, 2020	MF	—	(Argentina) Federico Higuaín	(United States) D.C. United	$50,000 GAM	

=== Transfers out ===
Date	Position	No.	Name	To	Fee	Ref.
Winter 2019–20
January 29, 2020	GK	—	(United States) Bryan Meredith	(Canada) Vancouver Whitecaps FC	Trade	
February 12, 2020	DF	—	(Bolivia) Jairo Quinteros	(Bolivia) Club Bolivar	Loan	
Summer 2020
August 14, 2020	DF	25	(United States) Grant Lillard	(United States) Columbus Crew	Trade	
September 5, 2020	MF	16	(United States) Luis Argudo	(Sweden) Norrby IF	Waivers	
September 8, 2020	MF	24	(United States) Lee Nguyen	(United States) New England Revolution	Trade	
September 28, 2020	DF	29	(Panama) Román Torres	(United States) Seattle Sounders FC	Trade	

=== MLS SuperDraft ===
Round	No.	Player	Pos.	Team
1	1	(United States) Robbie Robinson	FW	Clemson University
1	3	(United States) Dylan Nealis	MF	Georgetown University

== Non-competitive ==
=== Preseason ===
February 15 1	Inter Miami	1–2	Philadelphia Union	St. Petersburg, FL
4:00PM EST	Pizarro 33'	Report	Santos 19'; Oravec 86'	Stadium: Al Lang Stadium

February 22 2	Tampa Bay Rowdies	0–1	Inter Miami	St. Petersburg, FL
7:00PM EST			Robinson 21'	Stadium: Al Lang Stadium

== Competitive ==
=== Major League Soccer ===
==== League tables ====
===== Eastern Conference =====
Pos	Team	Pld	W	L	T	GF	GA	GD	Pts	PPG	Qualification
8	New England Revolution	23	8	7	8	26	25	+1	32	1.39	Qualification for the playoffs play-in round
9	Montreal Impact (Note: Canadian clubs could not qualify for the 2021 CONCACAF Champions League through the MLS regular season or playoffs.)	23	8	13	2	33	43	−10	26	1.13	Qualification for the playoffs play-in round
10	Inter Miami CF	23	7	13	3	25	35	−10	24	1.04	Qualification for the playoffs play-in round
11	Chicago Fire FC	23	5	10	8	33	39	−6	23	1.00	
12	Atlanta United FC	23	6	13	4	23	30	−7	22	0.96	Qualification for the 2021 CONCACAF Champions League (Note: As 2019 U.S. Open Cup champions)

Source: MLS
Rules for classification: 1) points per game; 2) total wins per match played; 3) total goal differential per match played; 4) total goals scored per match played; 5) fewest disciplinary points per match played; 6) away goal differential per away match played; 7) away goals scored per away match played; 8) home goal differential per home match played; 9) home goals scored per home match played; 10) coin toss or drawing of lots.

===== Overall =====
2020 MLS overall standings
Pos	Team	Pld	W	L	T	GF	GA	GD	Pts	PPG
17	Vancouver Whitecaps FC	23	9	14	0	27	44	−17	27	1.17
18	Montreal Impact	23	8	13	2	33	43	−10	26	1.13
19	Inter Miami CF	23	7	13	3	25	35	−10	24	1.04
20	LA Galaxy	22	6	12	4	27	46	−19	22	1.00
21	Real Salt Lake	22	5	10	7	25	35	−10	22	1.00

Source: MLS
Rules for classification: 1) points per game; 2) total wins per match played; 3) total goal differential per match played; 4) total goals scored per match played; 5) fewest disciplinary points per match played; 6) away goal differential per away match played; 7) away goals scored per away match played; 8) home goal differential per home match played; 9) home goals scored per home match played; 10) coin toss or drawing of lots.

==== MLS is Back – group stage ====
Group A results
Pos	Team	Pld	W	D	L	GF	GA	GD	Pts	Qualification
1	Orlando City SC (H)	3	2	1	0	6	3	+3	7	Advanced to knockout stage
2	Philadelphia Union	3	2	1	0	4	2	+2	7	Advanced to knockout stage
3	New York City FC	3	1	0	2	2	4	−2	3	Advanced to knockout stage
4	Inter Miami CF	3	0	0	3	2	5	−3	0	

Source: MLS
(H) Hosts

==== Matches ====
Win Draw Loss

March 1 1	Los Angeles FC	1–0	Inter Miami	Los Angeles, CA
5:30 PM EST	Vela 44'	Report		Stadium: Banc of California Stadium; Attendance: 22,121; Referee: Allen Chapman

March 7 2	D.C. United	2–1	Inter Miami	Washington, D.C.
3:30 PM EST	Asad 59' (pen.); Brillant 61'	Report	Pizarro 2'; Torres (red card) 54'	Stadium: Audi Field; Attendance: 17,183; Referee: Rubiel Vazquez

July 8 3 MLSiBT GS	Orlando City SC	2–1	Inter Miami	Bay Lake, FL
8:00 PM EDT	Mueller 70'; Nani 90+7'	Report	Agudelo 47'	Stadium: ESPN Wide World of Sports Complex; Referee: Rubiel Vazquez
Note: The match was played behind closed doors.

July 14 4 MLSiBT GS	Philadelphia Union	2–1	Inter Miami	Bay Lake, FL
10:30 PM EDT	Wagner 5'; Przybyłko 63'	Report	Pizarro 36'	Stadium: ESPN Wide World of Sports Complex; Referee: Silviu Petrescu
Note: The match was played behind closed doors.

July 20 5 MLSiBT GS	Inter Miami	0–1	New York City FC	Bay Lake, FL
9:00 AM EDT		Report	Tajouri-Shradi 64'	Stadium: ESPN Wide World of Sports Complex; Referee: Rosendo Mendoza
Note: The match was played behind closed doors.

August 22 6	Inter Miami	3–2	Orlando City SC	Fort Lauderdale, FL
8:00 PM EDT	Carranza 12', 23'; Pizarro 49'	Report	Dike 18'; Nani 80'	Stadium: Inter Miami CF Stadium; Referee: Armando Villarreal
Note: The match was played behind closed doors.

August 30 7	Nashville SC	1–0	Inter Miami	Nashville, TN
8:30 PM EDT	Godoy 53'	Report		Stadium: Nissan Stadium; Referee: Rosendo Mendoza
Note: The match was played behind closed doors..

September 2 8	Atlanta United FC	0–0	Inter Miami	Atlanta, GA
7:00 PM EDT		Report		Stadium: Mercedes-Benz Stadium; Referee: Guido Gonzales Jr.
Note: The match was played behind closed doors.

September 6 9	Inter Miami	0–0	Nashville SC	Fort Lauderdale, FL
8:00 PM EDT		Report		Stadium: Inter Miami CF Stadium; Referee: Nima Saghafi
Note: The match was played behind closed doors.

September 9 10	Inter Miami	2–1	Atlanta United FC	Fort Lauderdale, FL
8:00 PM EDT	Morgan 28', 38'	Report	Remedi 33'	Stadium: Inter Miami CF Stadium; Referee: Robert Sibiga
Note: The match was originally scheduled for August 26.

September 12 11	Orlando City SC	2–1	Inter Miami	Orlando, FL
7:30 PM EDT	Reyes 34' (o.g.); Pereyra 69'	Report	Shea 65'	Stadium: Exploria Stadium; Referee: Ismail Elfath
Note: The match was played behind closed doors.

September 19 12	Atlanta United FC	1–2	Inter Miami	Atlanta, GA
7:00 PM EDT	Gallagher 5'	Report	Agudelo 2'; Shea 11'	Stadium: Mercedes-Benz Stadium; Referee: Jair Marrufo
Note: The match was played behind closed doors.

September 23 13	Inter Miami	1–4	New York Red Bulls	Fort Lauderdale, FL
8:00 PM EDT	Agudelo 39'	Report	Egbo 14' (pen.); White 49'; Mines 85'; Royer 90+1'	Stadium: Inter Miami CF Stadium; Referee: Alex Chilowicz
Note: The match was played behind closed doors.

September 27 14	Philadelphia Union	3–0	Inter Miami	Chester, PA
7:30 PM EDT	Fontana 25'; Ilsinho 69'; Aaronson 90+6'	Report		Stadium: Subaru Park; Referee: Elton García
Note: The match was played behind closed doors.

October 3 15	Inter Miami	2–3	New York City FC	Fort Lauderdale, FL
8:00 PM EDT	Morgan 27', 38'	Report	Mitriță 4', 43'; Tinnerholm 35'	Stadium: Inter Miami CF Stadium; Referee: Jair Marrufo
Note: The match was played behind closed doors.

October 7 16	New York Red Bulls	1–2	Inter Miami	Harrison, NJ
7:00 PM EDT	Fernandez 53'	Report	Pellegrini 55'; Higuaín 81'	Stadium: Red Bull Arena; Referee: Armando Villarreal
Note: The match was played behind closed doors.

October 10 17	Inter Miami	1–0	Houston Dynamo	Fort Lauderdale, FL
5:00 PM EDT	Morgan 57' (pen.)	Report		Stadium: Inter Miami CF Stadium; Referee: Drew Fischer
Note: The match was played behind closed doors.

October 14 18	Inter Miami	1–1	Atlanta United FC	Fort Lauderdale, FL
8:00 PM EDT	Shea 80'	Report	Mulraney 83'	Stadium: Inter Miami CF Stadium; Attendance: 360; Referee: Ismail Elfath

October 17 19	Montreal Impact	2–1	Inter Miami	Harrison, NJ
7:00 PM EDT	Bojan 6'; Urruti 80'	Report	Shea 33'	Stadium: Red Bull Arena; Referee: Timothy Ford
Note: The match was played behind closed doors. Montreal played their home matches in Harrison, NJ due to COVID-19 travel restrictions.

October 24 20	Inter Miami	2–1	Orlando City SC	Fort Lauderdale, FL
3:30 PM EDT	Jansson 45' (o.g.); González Pirez 89'	Report	Dike 12'	Stadium: Inter Miami CF Stadium; Attendance: 2,216; Referee: Allen Chapman

October 28 21	FC Dallas	2–1	Inter Miami	Frisco, TX
8:30 PM EDT	Jara 60' (pen.); Hollingshead 82'	Report	Pizarro 33'	Stadium: Toyota Stadium; Attendance: 3,233; Referee: Victor Rivas

November 1 22	Toronto FC	2–1	Inter Miami	Hartford, CT
7:30 PM EDT	Akinola 55'; Pozuelo 84' (pen.)	Report	Matuidi 42'	Stadium: Pratt & Whitney Stadium; Attendance: 1,394; Referee: Rosendo Mendoza
Note: Toronto played their home matches in Hartford, CT due to COVID-19 travel restrictions.

November 8 23	Inter Miami	2–1	FC Cincinnati	Fort Lauderdale, FL
3:30 PM EDT	Ambrose 19'; González Pirez 23'	Report	Gyau 66'	Stadium: Inter Miami CF Stadium; Attendance: 2,400; Referee: Guido Gonzales, Jr.

==== MLS Cup Playoffs ====
November 20 Play-in Round	Nashville SC	3–0	Inter Miami CF	Nashville, TN
9:00 PM EST	Leal 14'; Mukhtar 24' (pen.); McCarty 57'	Report		Stadium: Nissan Stadium; Attendance: 3,240; Referee: Ismail Elfath

== Overall statistics ==
Games played	23
Games won	7
Games drawn	3
Games lost	13
Goals scored	25
Goals conceded	35
Goal difference	-10
Clean sheets	3
Yellow cards	54
Red cards	5
Top scorer	Lewis Morgan (5)

=== Top scorers ===
Rank	Position	Number	Name	MLS	MLS Cup	USOC	Total
1	MF	7	(Scotland) Lewis Morgan	5	0	0	5
2	MF	10	(Mexico) Rodolfo Pizarro	4	0	0	4
2	DF	28	(United States) Brek Shea	4	0	0	4
4	FW	12	(United States) Juan Agudelo	3	0	0	3
5	FW	21	(Argentina) Julián Carranza	2	0	0	2
5	DF	26	(Argentina) Leandro González Pírez	2	0	0	2
7	MF	8	(France) Blaise Matuidi	1	0	0	1
7	FW	9	(Argentina) Gonzalo Higuain	1	0	0	1
7	DF	33	(United States) Mikey Ambrose	1	0	0	1
7	MF	11	(Argentina) Matías Pellegrini	1	0	0	1
Total				24	0	0	24

As of 9 September 2020.

== See also ==
- 2020 Fort Lauderdale CF season
