= Luis Argudo =

American professional soccer player

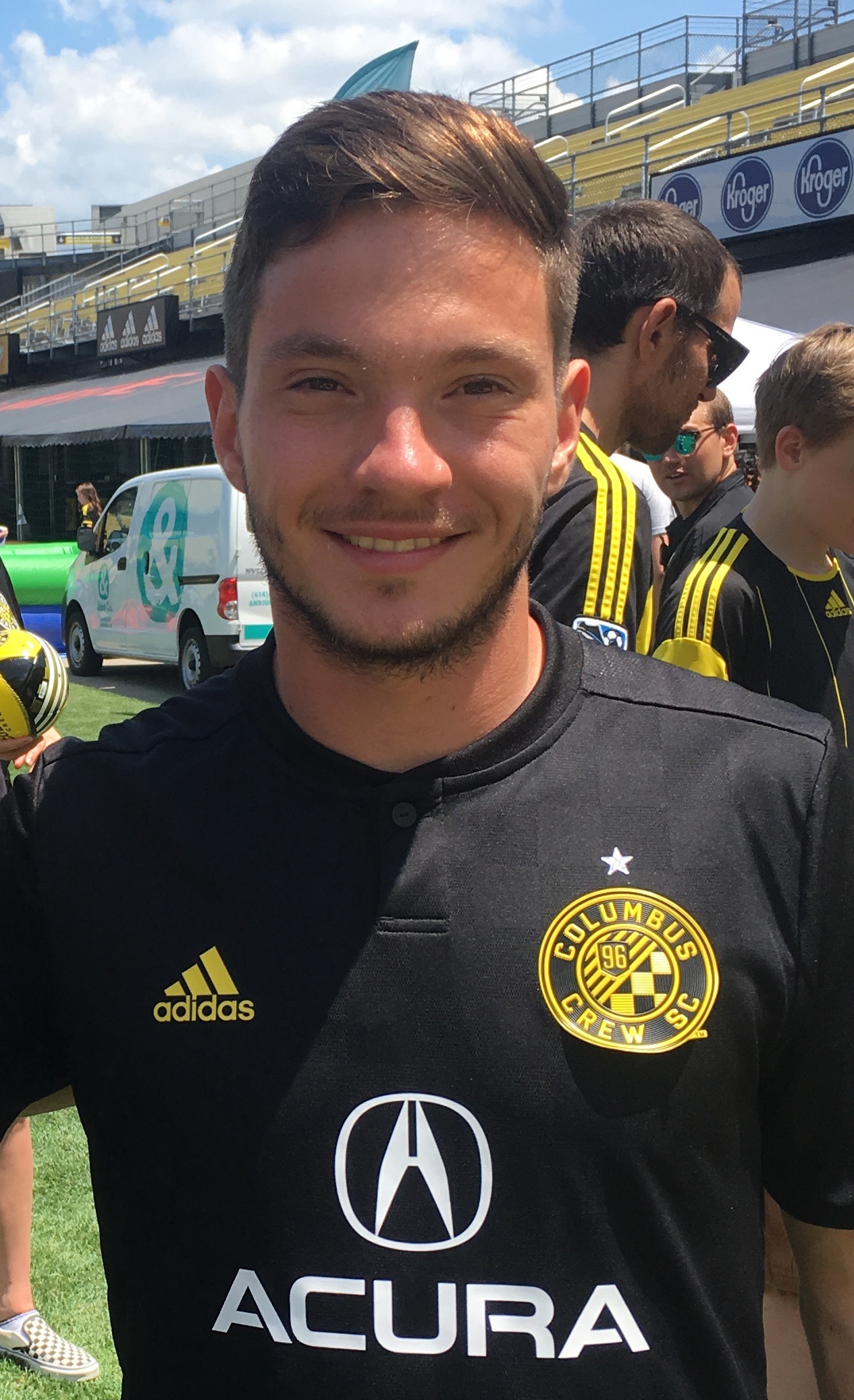
- Argudo with Columbus in 2018

Personal information
- Full name: Luis Alejandro Argudo
- Date of birth: December 13, 1995 (age 30)
- Place of birth: Queens, New York, United States
- Height: 5 ft 9 in (1.75 m)
- Position: Midfielder

Team information
- Current team: New York Pancyprian-Freedoms

Youth career
- 2012–2014: Albertson SC

College career
Years	Team	Apps	(Gls)
2014–2015	Elon Phoenix	39	(1)
2016–2017	Wake Forest Demon Deacons	48	(9)

Senior career*
Years	Team	Apps	(Gls)
2017	Carolina Dynamo	10	(2)
2018–2019	Columbus Crew	39	(1)
2019	→ Hartford Athletic (loan)	2	(0)
2020	Inter Miami	1	(0)
2021	Norrby IF	17	(3)
2022	Pittsburgh Riverhounds	20	(1)
2023	Zala FFF (7v7)	6	(2)
2023–	New York Pancyprian-Freedoms		
- * Club domestic league appearances and goals as of October 25, 2023

Luis Alejandro Argudo (born December 13, 1995) is an American soccer player who plays as a midfielder for the New York Pancyprian-Freedoms. He previously appeared at the semi-professional level for Carolina Dynamo, played professionally with Columbus Crew SC, Inter Miami, Norrby IF, and Pittsburgh Riverhounds, and spent time on loan with Hartford Athletic.

Argudo was born in New York City and attended Francis Lewis High School in Queens. He played two collegiate seasons at Elon University before transferring and playing his final two seasons at Wake Forest University, finishing as national runner-up with the Demon Deacons in 2016. He also appeared during the collegiate off-season with Carolina Dynamo. Columbus Crew SC drafted Argudo in the third round of the 2018 MLS SuperDraft; he eventually signed for the club almost two months later. After two seasons with the Crew, including his first professional goal, Argudo was selected by Inter Miami in the 2019 MLS Expansion Draft. He made just one appearance for Miami, then moved overseas the following year to join Swedish club Norrby IF. A native of the United States, Argudo is also eligible to play for the Colombian or Ecuadorian national teams through his parental heritage.

== Early life ==
Born in Queens, Argudo attended Francis Lewis High School in Fresh Meadows. He was a four-year varsity soccer player for the Patriots, finishing his prep career with 13 goals and 20 assists. At club level, he played for Albertson SC under Paul Riley. He also played for New York Ecuador in the NYC Futsal League.

Argudo was set to play college soccer at St. John's out of high school, but did not qualify academically. After taking classes at a community college for a semester, he instead committed to Elon, one of five members of the last recruiting class for head coach Darren Powell before his resignation.

== College and amateur ==
Argudo made his debut for new head coach Chris Little and Elon on August 29, 2014, starting against Stetson in the John Rennie/Nike Classic. He appeared 18 times as a freshman, starting 10 matches and tallying a goal and an assist. His first collegiate goal came on October 11, the third tally of a 5–0 victory over Northeastern. As a sophomore, Argudo appeared 21 times for an Elon team that was Colonial Athletic Association co-regular season champions and qualified for the NCAA Tournament for just the fourth time in the school's history. Although he did not score, he provided two assists during the season and started both NCAA Tournament matches. After two seasons, 39 games, and one goal for the Phoenix, Argudo transferred to Wake Forest.

Argudo debuted for the Demon Deacons on August 26, 2016, coming off the bench in a 1–0 defeat against Saint Louis. He worked his way into the starting lineup by September, tallying an assist against NC State in his first start for Wake Forest. Argudo scored for the first time in the second round of the NCAA Tournament, helping his team defeat Coastal Carolina 2–0. He tallied one goal in 25 appearances on the season as the Demon Deacons fell to Stanford in the national championship game. As a senior, Argudo had his best collegiate season: eight goals and six assists in 23 matches. He scored five times in the season's first four games, scored the game-winning goal against Elon on October 17, and converted during the penalty shootout in the ACC Tournament championship game. Argudo was named to the All-Atlantic Coast Conference Third Team following the season; he concluded his two seasons at Wake Forest with nine goals in 48 appearances.

=== Carolina Dynamo ===
Before his senior season at Wake Forest, Argudo appeared for Premier Development League club Carolina Dynamo. He made his debut on May 25, 2017, in a 2–0 defeat against North Carolina FC U23. He found his scoring touch in the back half of the season, with goals on June 17 against Wilmington Hammerheads and on July 13 against Tobacco Road FC. Argudo finished with two goals from 10 appearances in his lone season with Carolina.

== Club career ==
=== Columbus Crew SC ===
"[Argudo]’s a Colombian immigrant from the Bronx that’s got a little edge, and I love that in him. He’s bought in. He’s got some talent. He’s got some confidence. I think he’s versatile. I think he’s a really nice player."

— Columbus head coach Caleb Porter, speaking about Argudo in 2019

Initially, Argudo was not selected to take part in the 2018 MLS Combine; however, he was added to the Combine roster just two days before the event began after an injury to Drew Skundrich. On January 21, Columbus Crew SC drafted Argudo with the 67th overall pick of the 2018 MLS SuperDraft. After taking part in the team's preseason camp, he officially signed with Columbus on March 1. Argudo made his professional debut just two days later, replacing Pedro Santos in the 77th minute of a season-opening victory against Toronto FC. He missed three matches in April due to a MCL sprain but returned to the pitch on May 9 to earn his first start of the season in a victory over Philadelphia Union. Argudo went on to appear 21 times across all competitions in his rookie season, including two appearances in the 2018 MLS Cup Playoffs. The club picked up his contract option on December 9, 2018.

==== 2019: Loan to Hartford ====
After making just one appearance in Columbus through the first two months of the season, Argudo was sent on loan to USL Championship club Hartford Athletic on April 11, 2019. He was joined in Hartford by Crew teammate Jon Kempin. Argudo made his club debut two days later, starting and playing 90 minutes in a 4–1 defeat against Pittsburgh Riverhounds SC. After appearing just once more for Hartford, he was recalled by the Crew on April 23. He broke into the Columbus lineup over the summer with the club shorthanded due to injuries and international duty, going on to make 23 appearances for the Crew in all competitions. On July 17, Argudo provided his first MLS assist during a draw against Chicago Fire. Ten days later, he scored his first professional goal as part of a 3–2 victory over New York Red Bulls. After finishing the season with one goal and three assists across 23 matches with Columbus, Argudo had his contract option picked up by the Crew.

=== Inter Miami ===
After being left unprotected by Columbus, Argudo was selected by Inter Miami with the seventh overall pick of the 2019 MLS Expansion Draft. He made his debut, and his lone appearance for the club, during the group stage of the MLS is Back Tournament. He played 11 minutes off the bench in a defeat against Orlando City. Argudo was waived by Miami on September 5, having appeared on the bench just four other times outside of his one appearance. At the end of the season, he was not selected in the 2020 MLS Re-Entry Draft.

=== Norrby IF ===
Ahead of the 2021 season, Argudo went on trial in Major League Soccer (MLS) with expansion club Austin FC. He scored the first unofficial goal in the club's history, coming in a friendly against OKC Energy on March 19, and remained in Austin through the beginning of the 2021 MLS season. However, at the end of April he was released without a contract. He moved to Sweden in May to train with IK Sirius, but again did not earn a permanent contract. Argudo ended his search for a club on June 17, signing with Superettan side Norrby IF on a one-year deal with an option for two further seasons. He made his club debut on July 17, scoring the winning goal in the 65th minute of a 3–0 victory against Akropolis IF. Argudo tallied three goals in 18 appearances on the season, with one of those coming in a victory over GAIS on November 1. However, Norrby were unable to accomplish the goal that Argudo had stated when he joined the club in the summer: they missed out on promotion to the Allsvenskan, finishing in fourth place in the Superettan.

=== Pittsburgh Riverhounds ===
On March 25, 2022, Argudo signed with USL Championship club Pittsburgh Riverhounds.

=== New York Pancyprian-Freedoms ===
Argudo joined the New York Pancyprian-Freedoms in 2023.

== Personal life ==
Argudo was born in the United States to a Colombian mother and an Ecuadorian father. He lived in Ecuador as a child and possesses passports from all three countries. He has expressed interest in representing either Colombia or Ecuador, saying, "If there is an opportunity, obviously one would accept the possibilities when they arrive."

== Career statistics ==
As of October 1, 2022

Appearances and goals by club, season and competition
Club	Season	League			Cup (Note: Includes the U.S. Open Cup and Svenska Cupen)		Continental		Other		Total	
Club	Season	Division	Apps	Goals	Apps	Goals	Apps	Goals	Apps	Goals	Apps	Goals
Carolina Dynamo	2017	PDL	10	2	0	0	—		—		10	2
Columbus Crew SC	2018	Major League Soccer	18	0	1	0	—		2 (Note: Appearances in the MLS Cup Playoffs)	0	21	0
Columbus Crew SC	2019	Major League Soccer	21	1	2	0	—		—		23	1
Columbus Crew SC	Total		39	1	3	0	0	0	2	0	44	1
Hartford Athletic (loan)	2019	USL Championship	2	0	0	0	—		—		2	0
Inter Miami	2020	Major League Soccer	1	0	—		—		0	0	1	0
Norrby IF	2021	Superettan	17	3	1	0	—		—		18	3
Pittsburgh Riverhounds	2022	USL Championship	20	1	2	0	—		0	0	22	1
Career total			89	7	6	0	0	0	2	0	97	7

== Honors ==
Elon

- Colonial Athletic Association (regular season): 2015

Wake Forest

- ACC Men's Soccer Tournament: 2016, 2017
- Atlantic Coast Conference (regular season): 2017

Individual

- Third Team All-ACC: 2017
- United Soccer Coaches First Team All-South Region: 2017

== See also ==
- All-time Columbus Crew roster
- All-time North Carolina Fusion U23 roster
- List of Pittsburgh Riverhounds SC players
- List of Wake Forest University people
