= Alvas Powell =

Jamaican footballer (born 1994)

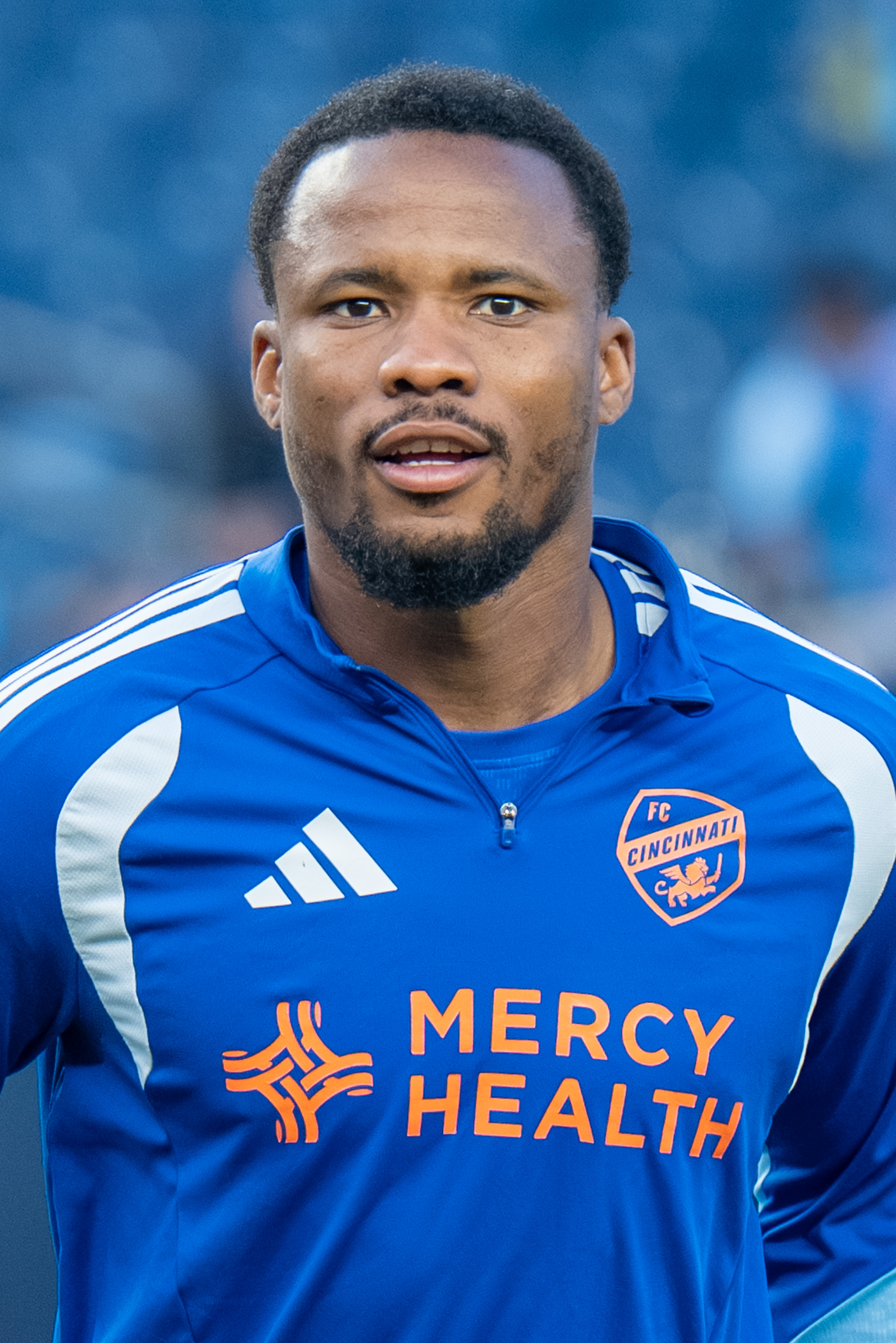
- Alvas with FC Cincinnati in 2026

Personal information
- Full name: Alvas Elvis Powell
- Date of birth: 18 July 1994 (age 32)
- Place of birth: Danvers Pen, St. Thomas, Jamaica
- Height: 1.82 m (6 ft 0 in)
- Position: Right-back

Team information
- Current team: FC Cincinnati
- Number: 2

Senior career*
Years	Team	Apps	(Gls)
2012–2014	Portmore United		
2013	→ Portland Timbers (loan)	5	(0)
2014–2018	Portland Timbers	116	(6)
2014	→ Sacramento Republic (loan)	3	(0)
2019	FC Cincinnati	13	(0)
2020	Inter Miami	4	(0)
2021	Al-Hilal Club	0	(0)
2021	Philadelphia Union	5	(0)
2022–	FC Cincinnati	110	(0)

International career^{‡}
2010–2011	Jamaica U17	8	(1)
2012–2013	Jamaica U20	6	(0)
2012–	Jamaica	58	(2)
Medal record
Men's football
Representing Jamaica
CONCACAF Gold Cup
Runner-up	2015 United States–Canada	Team
Runner-up	2017 United States	Team
- * Club domestic league appearances and goals as of 03:31, 28 September 2026 (UTC) ‡ National team caps and goals as of 19 July 2026

Alvas Elvis Powell (born 18 July 1994) is a Jamaican professional footballer who plays as a right-back for Major League Soccer club FC Cincinnati. A native of the parish St. Thomas, he attended Paul Bogle High School and gained recognition in the Da Costa Cup competition.

== Club career ==
=== Portmore United ===
Powell began his career with Portmore United; he made his senior debut after January 2012. In 2013, Powell went out on loan to Portland Timbers in the MLS, which was extended through December 2014. On 30 August 2014, he scored his first goal for the Timbers in a 3–0 win against the Vancouver Whitecaps.

=== FC Cincinnati ===
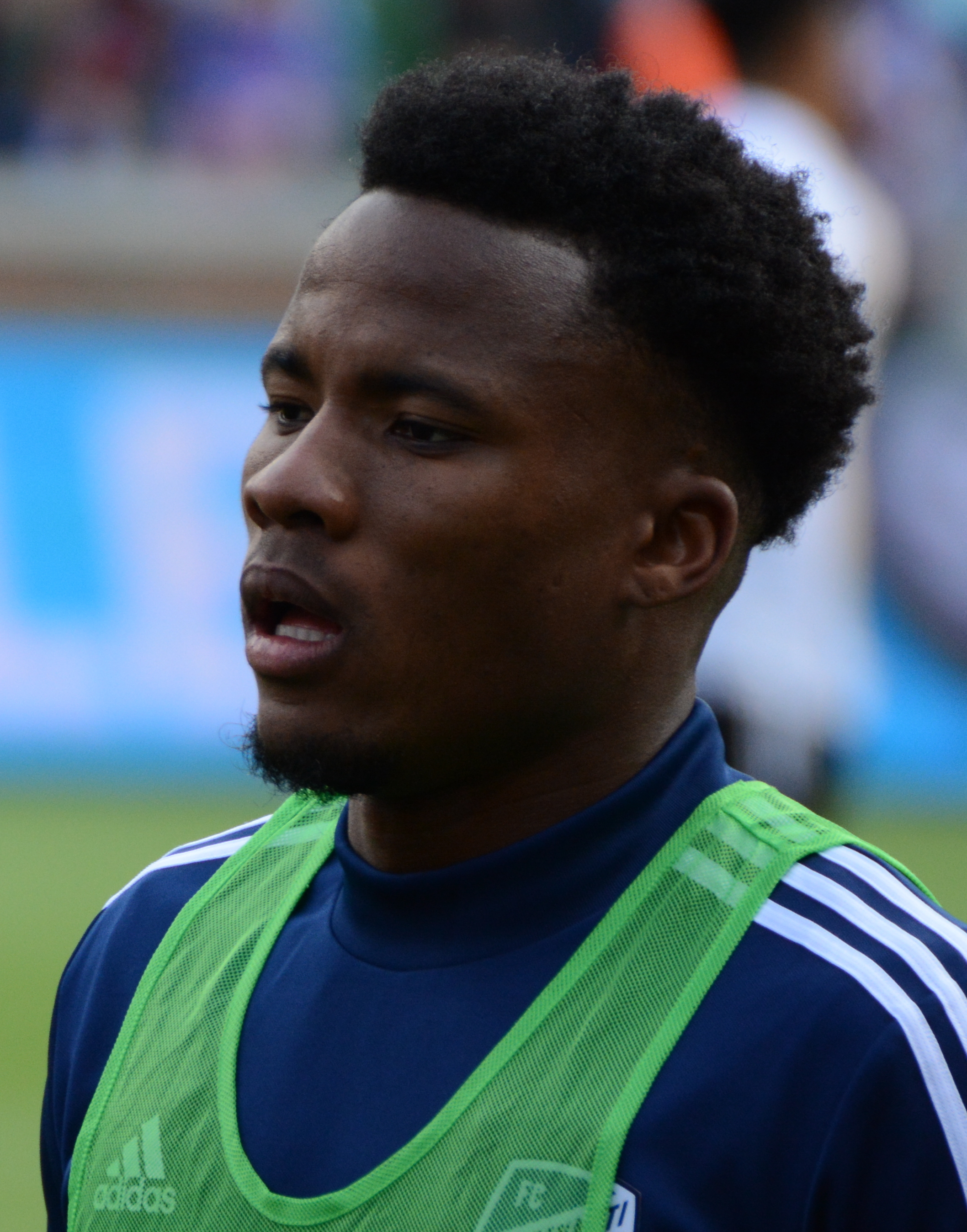
Alvas with FC Cincinnati in 2019.

On 27 December 2018, Powell was traded to FC Cincinnati ahead of their 2019 season, in exchange for $250,000 of General Allocation Money.

=== Inter Miami CF ===
On 19 November 2019, Powell was selected second overall by Inter Miami in the 2019 MLS Expansion Draft. Miami opted to decline his contract option following the 2020 season.

=== Al-Hilal Club ===
On 27 January 2021, Powell signed with Sudan Premier League side Al-Hilal Club. On 30 March 2021, Powell, through his agent, requested have his contract with the club terminated due to his "inability to cope with the atmosphere in Sudan."

=== Philadelphia Union ===
After training with the club in May and June, Powell signed a one-year deal with Philadelphia Union on 10 June 2021. On June 23, Powell debuted for the Union as a substitute in a 1–0 win over visiting Columbus Crew SC. Following the 2021 season, Powell's contract option was declined by Philadelphia.

=== Return to FC Cincinnati ===
On 17 December 2021, Powell re-joined former club FC Cincinnati ahead of their 2022 season. At the conclusion of the season, Cincinnati announced they were exercising Powell's contract option, keeping him at the club through the 2023 season.

== International career ==
He made his international debut with the Jamaica national team in 2012. He previously played at the 2011 FIFA U-17 World Cup. He helped the Reggae Boyz to capture the 2014 CFU Caribbean Football Unions (men's) title beating Trinidad and Tobago in penalties.

== Personal life ==
In 2015, Powell received his U.S. green card which qualifies him as a domestic player for MLS roster purposes.

== Career statistics ==
As of match played 26 September 2026

Club	Season	League			Playoffs (Note: Includes MLS Cup playoffs)		National cup (Note: Includes U.S. Open Cup)		League cup (Note: Includes Leagues Cup)		Continental		Total	
Club	Season	Division	Apps	Goals	Apps	Goals	Apps	Goals	Apps	Goals	Apps	Goals	Apps	Goals
Portmore United	2013	Red Stripe Premier League	–		–		–		–		2 (Note: Appearances in CONCACAF Champions Cup)	0	2	0
Portland Timbers	2013	MLS	5	0	–		1	0	–		–		6	0
Portland Timbers	2014	MLS	15	2	–		–		–		1	0	16	2
Portland Timbers	2015	MLS	31	0	6	0	1	0	–		–		38	0
Portland Timbers	2016	MLS	23	0	–		–		–		3	0	26	0
Portland Timbers	2017	MLS	23	2	2	0	–		–		–		25	2
Portland Timbers	2018	MLS	24	2	3	0	–		–		–		27	2
Portland Timbers	Total		121	6	11	0	2	0	–		4	0	138	6
Sacramento Republic FC (loan)	2014	USL Pro	3	0	–		–		–		–		3	0
FC Cincinnati	2019	MLS	13	0	–		–		–		–		13	0
Inter Miami	2020	MLS	4	0	1	0	–		–		–		5	0
Al-Hilal Club (Omdurman)	2021	Sudan Premier League	–		–		–		–		1 (Note: Appearance in CAF Champions League)	0	1	0
Philadelphia Union	2021	MLS	5	0	2	0	–		–		1	0	8	0
FC Cincinnati	2022	MLS	28	0	2	0	2	0	–		–		32	0
FC Cincinnati	2023	MLS	25	0	2	0	5	0	3	0	–		35	0
FC Cincinnati	2024	MLS	20	0	3	0	–		2	0	3	1	28	1
FC Cincinnati	2025	MLS	25	0	4	0	–		2	0	3	0	34	0
FC Cincinnati	2026	MLS	12	0	–		–		–		4	1	16	1
FC Cincinnati	Total		123	0	11	0	7	0	7	0	10	2	158	2
Career Total			156	6	25	0	9	0	7	0	18	2	315	8

=== International ===
Appearances and goals by national team and year
National team	Year	Apps	Goals
Jamaica	2012	2	0
Jamaica	2013	7	0
Jamaica	2014	9	0
Jamaica	2015	5	0
Jamaica	2016	3	0
Jamaica	2017	9	0
Jamaica	2018	–	
Jamaica	2019	14	2
Jamaica	2020	–	
Jamaica	2021	8	0
Jamaica	2022	1	0
Total		58	2

Scores and results list Jamaica's goal tally first, score column indicates score after each Powell goal.

List of international goals scored by Alvas Powell
No.	Date	Venue	Opponent	Score	Result	Competition
1	9 September 2019	Synthetic Track and Field Facility, Leonora, Guyana	Guyana	1–0	4–0	2019–20 CONCACAF Nations League B
2	9 September 2019	Synthetic Track and Field Facility, Leonora, Guyana	Guyana	2–0	4–0	2019–20 CONCACAF Nations League B

== Honors ==
Jamaica

- Caribbean Cup winner: 2014

Portmore United

- Jamaica National Premier League: 2012

Portland Timbers

- MLS Cup: 2015
- Western Conference (playoffs): 2015

FC Cincinnati

- Supporters' Shield: 2023
