= 2019 Carolina Challenge Cup =

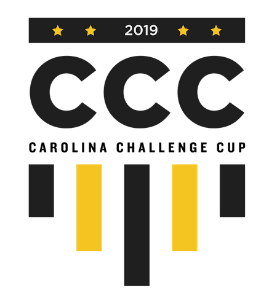

Tournament details
- Host country: United States
- Dates: February 16–23
- Teams: 4 (from 1 confederation)
- Venue(s): 1 (in 1 host city)

Final positions
- Champions: Columbus Crew SC (4th title)
- Runners-up: Chicago Fire
- Third place: FC Cincinnati
- Fourth place: Charleston Battery

Tournament statistics
- Matches played: 6
- Top scorer(s): (United States) Gyasi Zardes

The 2019 Carolina Challenge Cup was the 15th edition of the Carolina Challenge Cup, an annual soccer tournament held in Charleston, South Carolina by the Charleston Battery. The tournament ran from February 16 to 23, with all matches played at MUSC Health Stadium in Charleston.

In addition to the Charleston Battery of the USL Championship (USL), three Major League Soccer (MLS) clubs participated: Columbus Crew, Chicago Fire, and FC Cincinnati, all of Major League Soccer.

== Teams ==
Team	League	Appearance
(United States) Charleston Battery (hosts)	USLC	15th
(United States) Chicago Fire	MLS	4th
(United States) Columbus Crew	MLS	6th
(United States) FC Cincinnati	MLS	1st

== Cup matches ==
All times are Eastern Standard Time (UTC-05:00)

February 16	Columbus Crew	1–1	Chicago Fire	Charleston, South Carolina
5:00pm	Zardes 26'		Mihailovic 16'	Stadium: MUSC Health Stadium

February 16	Charleston Battery	1–2	FC Cincinnati	Charleston, South Carolina
7:30pm	Svantesson 52' (pen.)		Adi 2'; Mattocks 57' (pen.)	Stadium: MUSC Health Stadium

February 20	Charleston Battery	1–1	Columbus Crew	Charleston, South Carolina
5:00pm	Svantesson 21'		Robinho 45+2'	Stadium: MUSC Health Stadium

February 20	FC Cincinnati	1–1	Chicago Fire	Charleston, South Carolina
7:30pm	Lamah 84'		Katai 53'	Stadium: MUSC Health Stadium

February 23	FC Cincinnati	0–3	Columbus Crew	Charleston, South Carolina
5:00pm			Zardes 5', 20'; Santos 47'	Stadium: MUSC Health Stadium

February 23	Charleston Battery	0–1	Chicago Fire	Charleston, South Carolina
7:30pm			Herbers 85'	Stadium: MUSC Health Stadium

== Table standings ==
Pos	Club	GP	W	L	T	GF	GA	GD	Pts
1	Columbus Crew (C)	3	1	0	2	5	2	+3	5
2	Chicago Fire	3	1	0	2	3	2	+1	5
3	FC Cincinnati	3	1	1	1	3	5	−2	4
4	Charleston Battery	3	0	2	1	2	4	−2	1

(C) – Cup Winner

=== Top goalscorers ===
As of 24 February 2019

Rank	Player	Team	Goals
1	(United States) Gyasi Zardes	Columbus Crew	3
2	(United States) Ian Svantesson	Charleston Battery	2
3	(Nigeria) Fanendo Adi	FC Cincinnati	1
3	(Germany) Fabian Herbers	Chicago Fire	1
3	(Serbia) Aleksandar Katai	Chicago Fire	1
3	(Belgium) Roland Lamah	FC Cincinnati	1
3	(Jamaica) Darren Mattocks	FC Cincinnati	1
3	(United States) Djordje Mihailovic	Chicago Fire	1
3	(Brazil) Robinho	Columbus Crew	1
3	(Portugal) Pedro Santos	FC Cincinnati	1
