= 2019 MLS expansion draft =

Player draft for MLS teams

2019 MLS Expansion Draft

General information
- Date: November 19, 2019

Overview
- 10 total selections in 5 rounds
- Expansion teams: Inter Miami CF and Nashville SC
- Expansion season: 2020

The 2019 MLS Expansion Draft was a special draft for the Major League Soccer expansion teams Inter Miami CF and Nashville SC that was held on November 19, 2019. On October 6, 2019, Inter Miami CF won the coin toss for the Expansion Priority Draft, and chose to select first in the 2019 MLS Expansion Draft. Lists of protected rosters and draft-eligible players were released by MLS on November 16, 2019.

== Format ==
The rules for the 2019 MLS Expansion Draft as laid out by Major League Soccer.

- The five teams that had players selected by FC Cincinnati during the 2018 MLS Expansion Draft will be exempt from the 2019 Expansion Draft: D.C. United, Vancouver Whitecaps FC, FC Dallas, Houston Dynamo, and New York Red Bulls.
- Existing teams that are not exempt will be allowed to protect 12 players from their Roster. If a player is selected from a team, that team will no longer be available for selection.
- The expansion draft lasts five rounds, totaling ten players to be drafted. No trades are permitted during the draft.

== Expansion Draft picks ==
Pick	MLS Team	Player	Previous Team	Trade Notes
1	Inter Miami CF	Ben Sweat	New York City FC	
2	Nashville SC	Abu Danladi	Minnesota United FC	
3	Inter Miami CF	Alvas Powell	FC Cincinnati	
4	Nashville SC	Zarek Valentin	Portland Timbers	Traded to the Houston Dynamo in exchange for Joe Willis.
5	Inter Miami CF	Lee Nguyen	Los Angeles FC	
6	Nashville SC	Jalil Anibaba	New England Revolution	
7	Inter Miami CF	Luis Argudo	Columbus Crew SC	
8	Nashville SC	Brandon Vazquez	Atlanta United FC	Traded to FC Cincinnati in exchange for $150,000 in Targeted Allocation Money.
9	Inter Miami CF	Bryan Meredith	Seattle Sounders FC	
10	Nashville SC	Jimmy Medranda	Sporting Kansas City	

- Note: The order of selections was determined in the MLS Expansion Priority Draft on October 6, 2019.

== Team-by-team-breakdown ==
=== Atlanta United FC ===
As of November 16, 2019

Exposed
Mikey Ambrose
Jon Gallagher
José Hernández
Alec Kann
Kevin Kratz
Jeff Larentowicz
Justin Meram
Brendan Moore
Luiz Fernando
Michael Parkhurst
Dion Pereira
Florentin Pogba
Brek Shea
Brandon Vazquez

=== Chicago Fire ===
As of November 16, 2019

Exposed
Diego Campos
Stefan Cleveland
Elliot Collier
Marcelo
Nicolás Gaitán
Cristian Martínez
Amando Moreno
Nemanja Nikolić
David Ousted
Richard Sánchez
Bastian Schweinsteiger

=== FC Cincinnati ===
As of November 16, 2019

Exposed
Fanendo Adi
Nazmi Albadawi
Corben Bone
Hassan Ndam
Logan Gdula
Jimmy Hague
Justin Hoyte
Roland Lamah
Forrest Lasso
Emmanuel Ledesma
Ben Lundt
Kekuta Manneh
Darren Mattocks
Jimmy McLaughlin
Alvas Powell
Caleb Stanko
Przemysław Tytoń

=== Colorado Rapids ===
As of November 16, 2019

Exposed
Tim Howard
Niki Jackson
Kofi Opare
Abdul Rwatubyaye
Axel Sjöberg
Danny Wilson

=== Columbus Crew SC ===
As of November 16, 2019

Exposed
Luis Argudo
Ricardo Clark
Waylon Francis
David Guzmán
Federico Higuaín
Hector Jiménez
Jon Kempin
Ben Lundgaard
Connor Maloney
Youness Mokhtar
Edward Opoku
Eduardo Sosa
Josh Williams
Romario Williams

=== Los Angeles FC ===
As of November 16, 2019

Exposed
Lamar Batista
Steven Beitashour
Danilo Silva
Phillip Ejimadu
Mohamed El Monir
Alejandro Guido
Jordan Harvey
Dejan Jakovic
Tyler Miller
Lee Nguyen
Adrien Perez
Javier Pérez
Joshua Pérez
Peter-Lee Vassell
Rodolfo Zelaya

=== LA Galaxy ===
As of November 16, 2019

Exposed
Favio Álvarez
Uriel Antuna
Servando Carrasco
Emil Cuello
Tomas Hilliard-Arce
Zlatan Ibrahimović
Perry Kitchen
Matt Lampson
João Pedro
Juninho
Chris Pontius
Jørgen Skjelvik
Diedie Traore

=== Minnesota United FC ===
As of November 16, 2019

Exposed
Abu Danladi
Ethan Finlay
Marlon Hairston
Miguel Ibarra
Brent Kallman
Carter Manley
Wilfried Moimbé
Ally Hamis Ng'anzi
Lawrence Olum
Wyatt Omsberg
Ángelo Rodríguez
Rasmus Schüller
Bobby Shuttleworth

=== Montreal Impact ===
As of November 16, 2019

Exposed
Zachary Brault-Guillard
Omar Browne
Evan Bush
Rudy Camacho
Jorge Corrales
Rod Fanni
Anthony Jackson-Hamel
Ken Krolicki
Bacary Sagna
Amar Sejdič
Maximiliano Urruti
Jeisson Vargas

=== New England Revolution ===
As of November 16, 2019

Exposed
Juan Agudelo
Jalil Anibaba
Juan Fernando Caicedo
Edgar Castillo
Cody Cropper
Brad Knighton
Michael Mancienne
Brian Wright

=== New York City FC ===
As of November 16, 2019

Exposed
Luis Barraza
Dan Bedoya
Jeff Caldwell
Sebastien Ibeagha
Gary Mackay-Steven
Jesús Medina
Eric Miller
Abdi Mohamed
Ebenezer Ofori
Tony Rocha
Brad Stuver
Ben Sweat
Juan Pablo Torres

=== Orlando City SC ===
As of November 16, 2019

Exposed
Carlos Ascues
Alex DeJohn
Adam Grinwis
Cristian Higuita
Will Johnson
Sacha Kljestan
Shane O'Neill
Dillon Powers
Greg Ranjitsingh
Robinho
Brian Rowe
Lamine Sané
Kyle Smith

=== Philadelphia Union ===
As of November 16, 2019

Exposed
R. J. Allen
Fabinho
Joe Bendik
Aurélien Collin
Warren Creavalle
Marco Fabián
Olivier Mbaizo
Haris Medunjanin
Michee Ngalina

=== Portland Timbers ===
As of November 16, 2019

Exposed
Dairon Asprilla
Jeff Attinella
Tomás Conechny
Claude Dielna
Andrés Flores
Aljaž Ivačič
Modou Jadama
Kendall McIntosh
Andy Polo
Zarek Valentin
Renzo Zambrano

=== Real Salt Lake ===
As of November 16, 2019

Exposed
Tony Beltran
Alex Horwath
Luke Mulholland
Joao Plata
Justin Portillo
Nick Rimando
Kelyn Rowe
Pablo Enrique Ruíz

=== San Jose Earthquakes ===
As of November 16, 2019

Exposed
François Affolter
Matt Bersano
Eric Calvillo
Harold Cummings
Luis Felipe Fernandes
Carlos Fierro
Marcos López
Paul Marie
Jimmy Ockford
Kevin Partida
Andrew Tarbell

=== Seattle Sounders FC ===
As of November 16, 2019

Exposed
Saad Abdul-Salaam
Will Bruin
Jonathan Campbell
Emanuel Cecchini
Justin Dhillon
Chad Marshall
Bryan Meredith
Víctor Rodríguez
Alex Roldan
Harry Shipp
Luis Silva
Román Torres

=== Sporting Kansas City ===
As of November 16, 2019

Exposed
Botond Baráth
Eric Dick
Benny Feilhaber
Andreu Fontàs
Nicolas Hasler
Jimmy Medranda
Krisztián Németh
Seth Sinovic
Rodney Wallace
Gedion Zelalem

=== Toronto FC ===
As of November 16, 2019

Exposed
Jon Bakero
Nicolas Benezet
Laurent Ciman
Tsubasa Endoh
Drew Moor
Ashtone Morgan
Justin Morrow
Patrick Mullins
Caleb Patterson-Sewell
Ryan Telfer
Eriq Zavaleta
