= Ben Lundgaard =

American soccer player (born 1995)

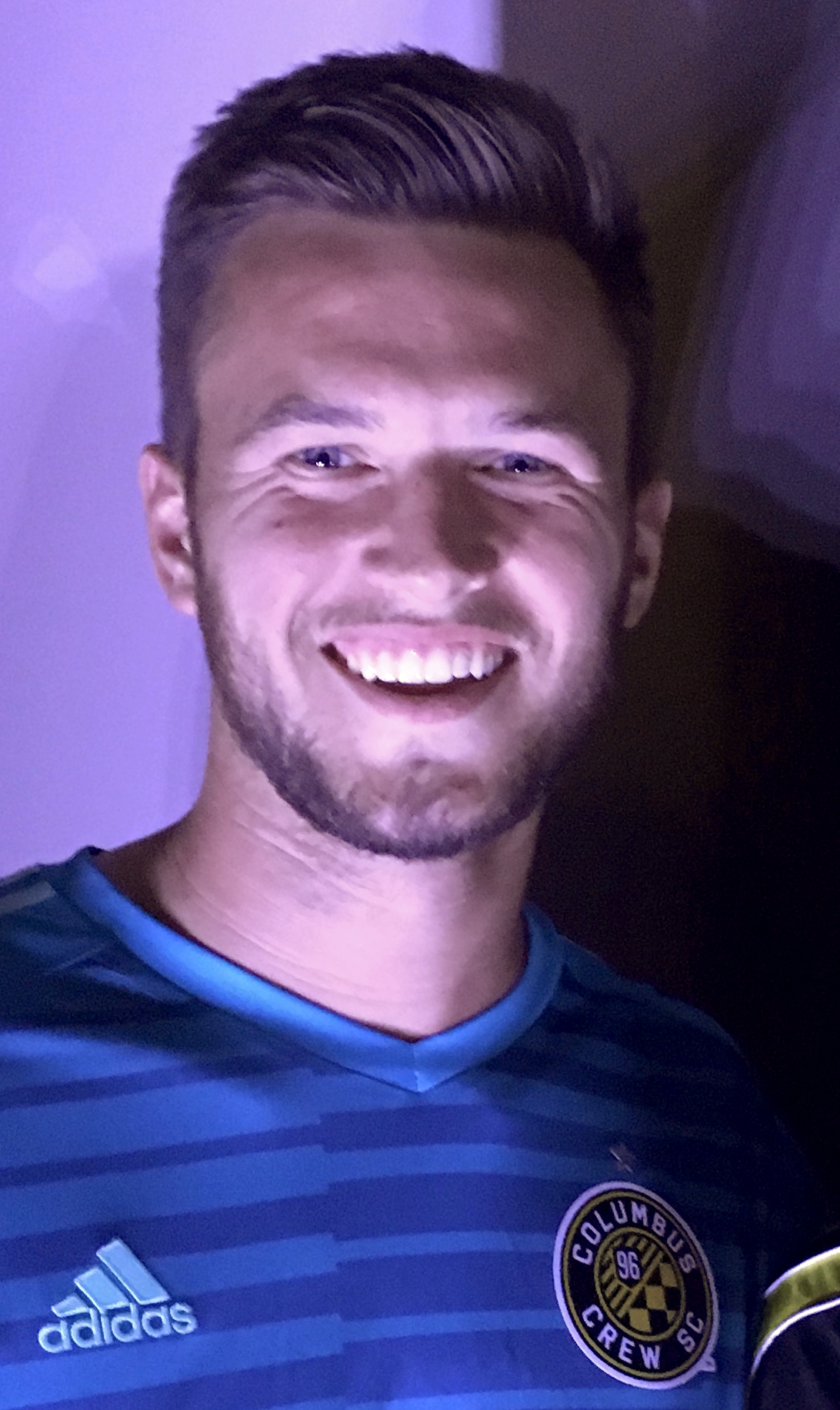
- Lundgaard with Columbus in 2018

Personal information
- Full name: Benjamin Cunningham Lundgaard
- Date of birth: September 25, 1995 (age 31)
- Place of birth: Wilmington, Delaware, United States
- Height: 6 ft 6 in (1.98 m)
- Position: Goalkeeper

Youth career
- –2014: Delaware Rush

College career
Years	Team	Apps	(Gls)
2014–2017	Virginia Tech Hokies	70	(0)

Senior career*
Years	Team	Apps	(Gls)
2016	Fresno Fuego	1	(0)
2017	New York Red Bulls U-23	13	(0)
2018–2019	Columbus Crew SC	0	(0)
2018	→ Indy Eleven (loan)	0	(0)
2019	→ Pittsburgh Riverhounds SC (loan)	4	(0)
2020	Atlanta United 2	13	(0)
2020	→ Atlanta United (loan)	0	(0)
2021	Atlanta United	0	(0)
2021	→ Atlanta United 2 (loan)	4	(0)
Total		35	(0)
- * Club domestic league appearances and goals

Benjamin Cunningham Lundgaard (born September 25, 1995) is an American retired soccer player who played as a goalkeeper. He appeared at the semi-professional level for Fresno Fuego and New York Red Bulls U-23 and spent time with Columbus Crew SC, Indy Eleven, Pittsburgh Riverhounds SC, Atlanta United, and Atlanta United 2 at the professional level.

Lundgaard grew up in Wilmington, Delaware, winning three state titles at the Salesianum School and playing club soccer with the Delaware Rush. He played collegiately for four seasons at Virginia Tech, leading the Hokies to the NCAA Division I Men's Soccer Tournament for the first time in nine years as a junior and earning a first-team all-Atlantic Coast Conference nod as a senior. Lundgaard was drafted by Columbus Crew SC in the first round of the 2018 MLS SuperDraft but never made an appearance for the club, spending time on loan at Indy Eleven and Pittsburgh Riverhounds SC. He joined Atlanta United 2 ahead of the 2020 season.

== Early life ==
Born in Wilmington, Delaware, Lundgaard grew up in Greenville and attended the Salesianum School in Wilmington. He was a three-year varsity letterman and as a senior a team captain, winning the DIAA Division I state championship and finishing nationally ranked in each of his seasons on varsity. As a senior, Lundgaard conceded just two goals while keeping 15 shoutouts in 17 matches. He played club soccer with Delaware Rush and committed to play collegiately at Virginia Tech. The Hokies' 2014 recruiting class also included Ricardo John and Collin Verfurth.

== College and amateur ==
Lundgaard stepped straight into the starting lineup for the Hokies, making his debut on August 29, 2014, in a 1–0 overtime victory against SIU Edwardsville. Although he split time with three other goalkeepers, primarily senior Ben Lockler, Lundgaard made 12 appearances during his freshman season. He kept six shutouts and was responsible for five of Virginia Tech's nine victories on the year. As a sophomore, Lundgaard cemented his spot as the team's starting goalkeeper. He posted three shutouts in 16 appearances, capped by an October 16 match against nationally ranked Notre Dame. Lundgaard made two saves in that game, holding the Fighting Irish to a scoreless draw.

Lundgaard kept eight shutouts in 22 appearances as a junior, both career-highs, and led the Hokies to the NCAA Tournament for the first time since 2007. In the third round of the tournament, he made nine saves to help Virginia Tech defeat Indiana by a 2–1 scoreline, although the Hokies fell in the next round to Wake Forest. He earned a spot on the TopDrawerSoccer.com Best XI Third Team at the end of the year. Lundgaard was named as a team captain as a senior, going on to play all but eight minutes on the season ahead of Morten Lamps. He was instrumental in a victory against No. 1 Notre Dame on September 22, facing 23 shots and making 10 saves as the Hokies claimed a 2–1 victory; his 10 saves were a career-high. Lundgaard kept six clean sheets in 20 appearances and was named First Team All-Atlantic Coast Conference. He appeared in 70 matches during his time at Virginia Tech, while his 23 career shutouts ranked second in school history, behind only Chase Harrison.

=== Fresno Fuego ===
Following his sophomore season at Virginia Tech, Lundgaard played in the Premier Development League (PDL) with Fresno Fuego. He made his lone appearance for the club on June 4, 2016, playing 45 minutes in a 1–0 victory against Southern California Seahorses.

=== New York Red Bulls U-23 ===
Lundgaard returned to the PDL following his junior season at Virginia Tech, playing for New York Red Bulls U-23. He was installed as the club's starting goalkeeper, making his debut in a 3–2 victory against Reading United on May 20, 2017. Lundgaard conceded just 10 regular season goals and helped the club to the PDL regular season title. He started the Eastern Conference play-in game but conceded a season-high four goals as the U-23s were eliminated by Long Island Rough Riders. Lundgaard appeared 14 times and was named as the 2017 PDL Goalkeeper of the Year.

== Club career ==
=== Columbus Crew SC ===
==== 2018: Loan to Indy ====
Lundgaard was one of five goalkeepers selected to participate in the 2018 MLS Combine and one of two Virginia Tech players, along with Marcelo Acuna. Columbus Crew SC drafted Lundgaard with the 21st overall pick of the 2018 MLS SuperDraft, the first time that the club had ever selected a goalkeeper in the first round. After taking part in preseason, he signed for Crew SC on March 1. Less than a week later, Lundgaard was sent to United Soccer League club Indy Eleven on a season-long loan. After serving as the backup goalkeeper in each of the club's first two matches, he returned to Columbus on April 4 to undergo surgery for an injured ulnar collateral ligament in his thumb. Lundgaard returned to full health in mid-June, but was unable to crack the starting lineup in Indy. He sat on the bench 23 times on the year, then returned to Columbus at the end of the season without appearing in a match for the Eleven. On December 9, Lundgaard had his contract option picked up by the Crew.

==== 2019: Loan to Pittsburgh ====
For the second consecutive season, Lundgaard was sent on loan by Columbus, this time joining USL Championship club Pittsburgh Riverhounds SC. Although he had been with the Hounds in preseason camp, the move wasn't made official until March 6, 2019, with the loan lasting for the duration of the 2019 USL Championship season. Lundgaard made his club and professional debut on March 23, starting at Children's Mercy Park as the Riverhounds drew 2–2 with Swope Park Rangers. He appeared in four of the club's first six matches of the season, keeping two clean sheets, but fell out of the lineup behind Kyle Morton and midseason arrival Austin Pack. Lundgaard suffered a back injury in late April, necessitating the signing of Pack, and was unable to return to the Pittsburgh lineup after returning to full health. He was recalled by the Crew on June 21 to provide cover after Zack Steffen completed a move to Europe. Following the end of the Crew's season, Lundgaard was officially loaned back to Pittsburgh, but did not train with the Hounds, remaining on the Pittsburgh roster for the playoffs only in case of an injury to Morton or Pack. Lundgaard had his contract option declined by Columbus on October 21, ending his two-year affiliation with the club.

=== Atlanta United 2 ===
On January 27, 2020, Lundgaard signed for USL Championship club Atlanta United 2. He made his club debut on March 8, making two saves in a 1–0 defeat against Charleston Battery. After the season was halted due to the COVID-19 pandemic and then resumed in July, Lundgaard remained as the primary starting goalkeeper, playing in 13 games. In his last three appearances on the year, he made two penalty saves, with stops against Tampa Bay Rowdies on August 22 and Miami FC on October 4. At the end of the season, Lundgaard had his contract option picked up by the club. He then joined Atlanta United on a short-term loan for the resumption of the 2020 CONCACAF Champions League. Lundgaard remained on the bench against América as Atlanta was eliminated from the competition.

=== Atlanta United ===
After one season with Atlanta United 2, Lundgaard signed a Major League Soccer (MLS) contract with Atlanta United on March 4, 2021. He joined on a one-year deal with two additional option years; Atlanta vice president Carlos Bocanegra said that Lundgaard had "been a model of consistency and hard work since joining Atlanta United 2" and had earned an opportunity with the first team. He missed the MLS season opener with a lower body injury but returned to sit on the bench 15 times in all competitions. However, Lundgaard did not play a game for the Atlanta first team. He appeared in four matches, all coming while back on loan with Atlanta United 2. Following the season, Lundgaard had his contract option declined by the club. He never appeared for the Atlanta United first team, but played in 17 games across two years with the 2's.

== Personal life ==
Lundgaard majored in public relations while at Virginia Tech. He is of Norwegian heritage: his great-grandfather was born in Norway. His father, Per, competed for the University of Wyoming in swimming and water polo while his brother, Peter, played soccer at York College of Pennsylvania.

== Career statistics ==
Appearances and goals by club, season and competition
Club	Season	League			Cup		Continental		Other		Total	
Club	Season	Division	Apps	Goals	Apps	Goals	Apps	Goals	Apps	Goals	Apps	Goals
Fresno Fuego	2016	PDL	1	0	—		—		0	0	1	0
New York Red Bulls U-23	2017	PDL	13	0	—		—		1 (Note: Appearance in the PDL playoffs)	0	14	0
Columbus Crew SC	2018	Major League Soccer	0	0	0	0	—		0	0	0	0
Columbus Crew SC	2019	Major League Soccer	0	0	0	0	—		—		0	0
Columbus Crew SC	Total		0	0	0	0	0	0	0	0	0	0
Indy Eleven (loan)	2018	USL	0	0	0	0	—		0	0	0	0
Pittsburgh Riverhounds SC (loan)	2019	USL Championship	4	0	0	0	—		0	0	4	0
Atlanta United 2	2020	USL Championship	13	0	—		—		—		13	0
Atlanta United (loan)	2020	Major League Soccer	0	0	—		0	0	—		0	0
Atlanta United	2021	Major League Soccer	0	0	—		0	0	0	0	0	0
Atlanta United	Total		0	0	0	0	0	0	0	0	0	0
Atlanta United 2 (loan)	2021	USL Championship	4	0	—		—		—		4	0
Career total			35	0	0	0	0	0	1	0	36	0

== Honors ==
Fresno Fuego

- Central Pacific Division: 2016

New York Red Bulls U-23

- Premier Development League (regular season): 2017
- Mid Atlantic Division: 2017

Pittsburgh Riverhounds SC

- Eastern Conference (regular season): 2019

Individual

- TopDrawerSoccer.com Best XI Third Team: 2016
- First Team All-ACC: 2017
- TopDrawerSoccer.com Best XI Second Team: 2017
- United Soccer Coaches All-East Region Third Team: 2017
- Premier Development League Goalkeeper of the Year: 2017
