= Robinho (footballer, born January 1995) =

Brazilian footballer

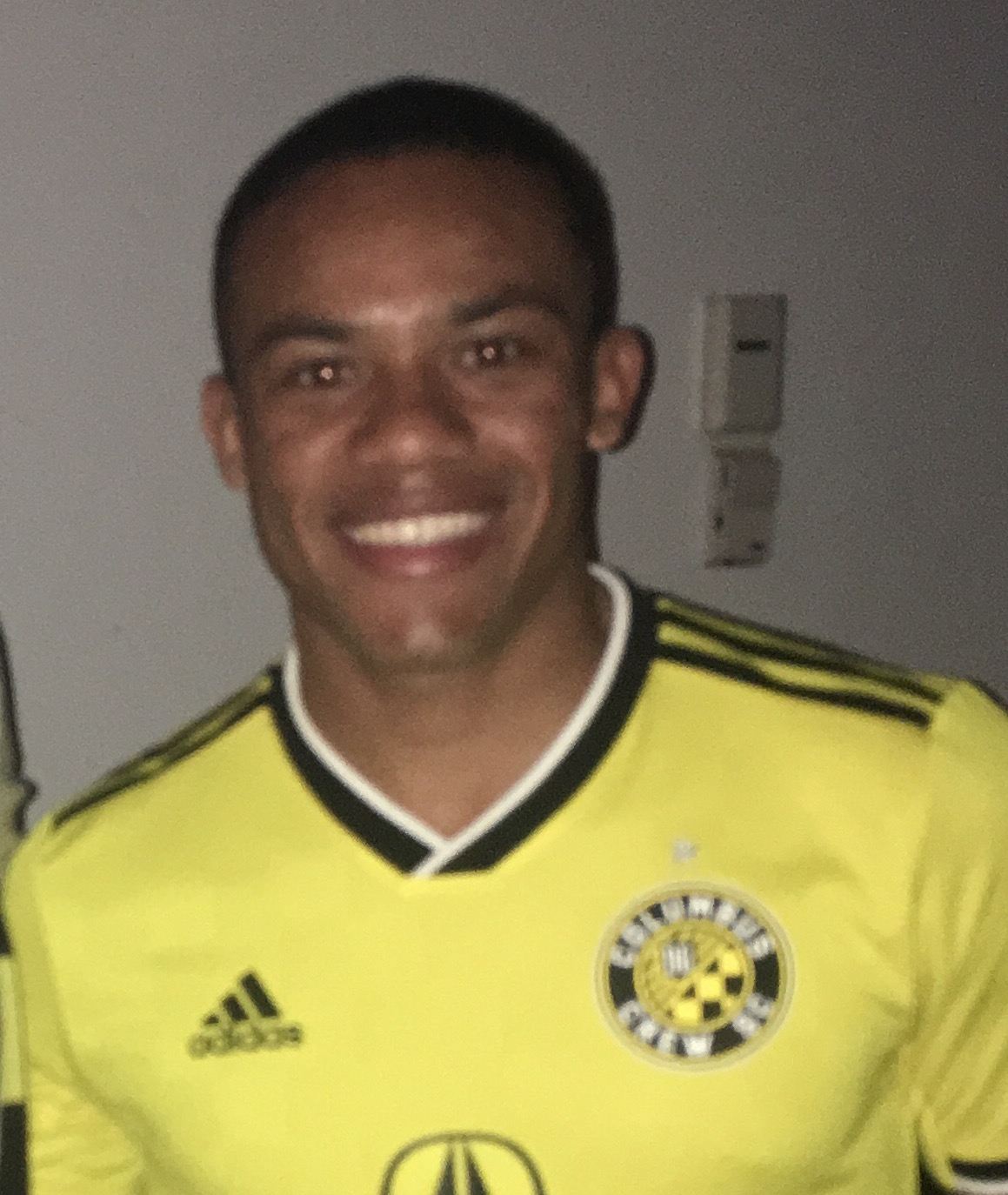
- Robinho at a Columbus Crew SC event in 2019

Personal information
- Full name: Francisco Wellington Barbosa de Lisboa
- Date of birth: 19 January 1995 (age 31)
- Place of birth: Senador Pompeu, Brazil
- Height: 1.66 m (5 ft 5 in)
- Position: Winger

Team information
- Current team: Botafogo-SP

Senior career*
Years	Team	Apps	(Gls)
2014	Itapipoca	9	(1)
2014–2018	Ceará	19	(0)
2015	→ Confiança (loan)	10	(3)
2016	→ Novo Hamburgo (loan)	13	(2)
2017	→ Cuiabá (loan)	8	(0)
2018	→ Santa Cruz (loan)	18	(4)
2019	Columbus Crew SC	19	(0)
2019–2020	Orlando City	11	(0)
2021	Confiança	20	(1)
2022	Paysandu	22	(2)
2023–	Botafogo-SP	44	(6)
- * Club domestic league appearances and goals as of 18 December 2025

Francisco Wellington Barbosa de Lisboa (19 January 1995), simply known as Robinho, is a Brazilian professional footballer who plays as a winger for Botafogo-SP.

== Club career ==
=== Brazil ===
Robinho began his career with Itapipoca in 2014. During that season he appeared in 9 matches and scored 1 goal. This caught the attention of Série B team, Ceará, where he was transferred and finished out the 2014 season with 5 appearances for the team. In 2015, Robinho played in 17 matches in various competitions for the team, but was loaned to Confiança Esporte Clube and finished the season with 13 appearances and 2 goals. In 2016, he maid 5 appearances in Série B for Ceará, but again was loaned out. This time to Esporte Clube Novo Hamburgo where he made 13 appearances and scored 2 goals. In 2017, Robinho was loaned to Cuiabá Esporte Clube in Série C making 8 appearances. In 2018, Ceará was promoted to Série A, the first division of the Brazilian football league system, Robinho made 2 appearances for the team before being loaned to Santa Cruz in Série C.

In total, Robinho totaled 14 goals in 119 appearances in all competitions during his time in Brazil.

=== Columbus Crew ===
Despite bouncing around the lower divisions in Brazil, Robinho impressed former Columbus Crew coach Gregg Berhalter who made the signing before he left the Crew for a reported $200,000 The move to Columbus became official on 18 January 2019. Despite depth at the wing positions for Columbus, Robinho managed to make 17 appearances during the first half of the season.

=== Orlando City ===
On 11 July 2019, Robinho was traded to Orlando City for $50,000 in Targeted Allocation Money (TAM). He made his debut for the team on 18 July 2019, starting in a 1–1 draw away to Portland Timbers. After making a total of 12 appearances in two seasons, Robinho had his contract option declined as part of the club's end of season roster moves in December 2020.

On 1 February 2021, Robinho returned to Brazil to sign for newly promoted Campeonato Brasileiro Série B side Confiança.

== Career statistics ==
As of 29 November 2020

Club	Season	League			National Cup		League Cup		Total	
Club	Season	Division	Apps	Goals	Apps	Goals	Apps	Goals	Apps	Goals
Itapipoca	2014	Cearense	9	1	0	0	0	0	9	1
Ceará	2014	Série B	5	0	3	0	0	0	8	0
Ceará	2015	Série B	6	0	4	0	0	0	10	0
Ceará	2016	Série B	5	0	1	0	0	0	6	0
Ceará	2017	Série B	1	0	0	0	0	0	1	0
Ceará	2018	Série A	2	0	0	0	0	0	2	0
Ceará	Total		19	0	8	0	0	0	27	0
Confiança (loan)	2015	Série C	10	3	0	0	0	0	10	3
Novo Hamburgo (loan)	2016	Gaúcho	13	2	0	0	0	0	13	2
Cuiabá (loan)	2017	Série C	8	0	4	0	0	0	12	0
Santa Cruz (loan)	2018	Série B	18	4	12	1	0	0	30	5
Columbus Crew	2019	MLS	19	0	2	0	—		21	0
Orlando City	2019	MLS	6	0	0	0	—		6	0
Orlando City	2020	MLS	5	0	0	0	1	0	6	0
Orlando City	Total		11	0	0	0	1	0	12	0
Career Totals			107	10	26	1	1	0	134	11
