= 2019 Portland Timbers season =

Portland Timbers
2019 season
- President: Merritt Paulson
- Head coach: Giovanni Savarese
- Stadium: Providence Park; Portland, Oregon (Capacity: 25,218)
- Major League Soccer: Conference: 6th Overall:11th
- MLS Cup Playoffs: First round
- U.S. Open Cup: Semifinals
- Top goalscorer: League: Jeremy Ebobisse; Brian Fernández (11 each); All: Brian Fernández (15 goals)
- Highest home attendance: Preseason: N/A; Regular season: 25,218; Open Cup: 16,235
- Lowest home attendance: Preseason: N/A; Regular season: 25,218; Open Cup: 16,235
- Average home league attendance: Preseason: N/A; Regular season: 25,218; Open Cup: 16,235
- Biggest win: 4–0; HOU (June 22); LAG (July 27)
- Biggest defeat: 4–1; LAFC (March 10)
Primary colors	Secondary colors
- All statistics correct as of July 29, 2019.

The 2019 Portland Timbers season was the 33rd season in their existence and the 9th season for the Portland Timbers in Major League Soccer (MLS), the top-flight professional soccer league in the United States and Canada. The season covers the period from the end of the Timber's last match in MLS or MLS Playoffs in 2018 (December 8, 2018) to their final match in MLS or MLS Playoffs in 2019 (October 19, 2019).

== Season review by month ==
=== Off season ===
On December 10, Zarek Valentin has signed a new contract.

Portland also announced roster moves that include recalling Eryk Williamson's loan from Portuguese first-division side Clube Desportivo Santa Clara. Andy Polo is now under contract with Portland after reaching a performance threshold included in his loan agreement. Portland exercised contract options on goalkeeper Kendall McIntosh, defenders Modou Jadama and Bill Tuiloma, and forwards Jeremy Ebobisse and Foster Langsdorf. Midfielder Cristhian Paredes remains on loan with Portland from Liga MX side Club América.

Portland did not exercise contract options on midfielders Victor Arboleda, Tomás Conechny, Andrés Flores and Lawrence Olum. Goalkeepers Jake Gleeson and Steve Clark are out of contract while defender Roy Miller and midfielder Jack Barmby are also out of contract. Portland announced they are in discussions with Conechny, Florés, and Clark for the upcoming season. Gleeson and Miller will now be available for free agency. Samuel Armenteros' loan will expire on December 31, 2018.

Later on in the day, Portland also announced the signings of Portland Timbers 2 midfielders Marvin Loría and Renzo Zambrano.

Portland released its protected list ahead of the 2018 MLS Expansion Draft. The protected players are Jeff Attinella, Sebastián Blanco, Diego Chara, Jeremy Ebobisse, Marco Farfan, David Guzmán, Foster Langsdorf, Larrys Mabiala, Lucas Melano, Cristhian Paredes, Andy Polo, Diego Valeri, Jorge Villafaña, and Eryk Williamson. FC Cincinnati are allowed to select up to five players from the eligible MLS player pool. Only a single player can be drafted from any one club.

On December 13, former Portland midfielder Ned Grabavoy was appointed to club technical director.

On December 14, Portland passed on round one of the 2018 MLS Re-Entry Draft.

On December 20, forward Jeremy Ebobisse was named to the U.S. Men's National Team roster for January training camp. Later that day, Portland passed on round two of the 2018 MLS Re-Entry Draft.

On December 27, Portland traded right back Alvas Powell to Major League Soccer side FC Cincinnati for $250,000 in General Allocation Money. Portland will also retain a percentage of the international transfer value on Powell.

On January 4, Portland's fixtures for the Mobile Mini Sun Cup preseason was released.

On January 7, MLS released the 2019 schedule for all clubs.

On January 10, center back and former club captain Liam Ridgewell mutually agreed to part ways with the club. He has been with the club since 2014.

On January 11, Portland selected American forward Ryan Sierakowski from Michigan State and German defender Lennart Hein from Saint Louis University in the first two rounds of the 2019 MLS SuperDraft.

On January 14, Portland selected American defender Francesco Moore from Indiana and Venezuelan midfielder David Zalzman from Memphis in the final third and forth rounds of the 2019 MLS SuperDraft.

On January 15, Portland announced their full preseason plans which include trips to Costa Rica and Tucson, Arizona.

On January 16, Portland acquire MLS rights to French defender Claude Dielna from New England Revolution.

On January 18, Portland signed goalkeeper Aljaž Ivačič from Slovenian PrvaLiga side NK Olimpija Ljubljana.

Later that day, it was announced that David Guzmán and [Marvin Loría were called up by Costa Rica for the match against USA on February 2, 2019.

=== Preseason ===
On January 21, Portland club players reported in for the start of the 2019 MLS Preseason.

On January 22, Portland Timbers eMLS competitor Edgar Guerrero finished in a tie for fifth on points with a record of 4-3-2 at the 2019 eMLS League Series One held in Los Angeles.

On January 25, Portland announced the re-signing of goalkeeper Steve Clark and midfielder Andrés Flores for the 2019 season. Portland announced that midfielder Tomás Conechny has returned from his loan from Superliga Argentina club San Lorenzo while Eryk Williamson also returned from his loan with Portuguese first-division side C.D. Santa Clara.

On January 29, Portland released their 2019–20 home kit that features ponderosa green and green night hoops with ponderosa green sleeves with native gold and white trims. It is the first time since the 2003 season that the team used a hoop design.

On February 4, Portland played their first preseason match against Deportivo Saprissa and won 4–0. Goals were scored by Dairon Asprilla in the 9th minute, a brace from Lucas Melano in the 32nd and 45+1 minute, and Tomás Conechny in the 61st minute.

On February 7, Portland ended their Costa Rica preseason campaign by defeating C.S. Herediano 3–1. Goals were scored by Lucas Melano in the 31st minute, Andrés Flores in the 60th minute, and Foster Langsdorf in the 69th minute. Portland now travels to Tucson, Arizona to take part in the 2019 Mobile Mini Sun Cup for their final portion of preseason.

On February 13, Portland began renegotiation terms of their deal with NK Olimpija Ljubljana on goalkeeper Aljaž Ivačič, after he was found to have a leg injury.

Later that evening, Portland began their first of three matches in the 2019 Mobile Mini Sun Cup against Seattle Sounders FC. Portland defeated Seattle 2–1 with goals from a successfully converted penalty by Diego Valeri in the 40th minute and the game winner from Jeremy Ebobisse, assisted by Dairon Asprilla in the 88th minute.

On February 15, goalkeeper Aljaž Ivačič underwent successful surgery to repair a left tibial stress fracture. He is expected to return to play in 6–8 weeks.

On February 16, Portland played their second match in the 2019 Mobile Mini Sun Cup against New York Red Bulls. The match ended in a draw with goals from Jeremy Ebobisse, assisted by Sebastián Blanco in the 62nd minute. The final goal was a successfully converted penalty by Diego Valeri in the 90th minute.

On February 17, Portland Timbers eMLS competitor Edgar "RCTID_Thiago" Guerrero finished second overall with a record of 5–1–3 at the 2019 eMLS League Series Two held in Frisco, Texas. Guerrero finished first in the Western Conference and lost in the final versus Philadelphia Union's Cormac "doolsta" Dooley 2–1 in a best of three.

On February 20, Portland signed Paraguayan right back Jorge Moreira on loan from Argentine Primera División side River Plate with purchase option.

Later that evening, Portland played their third match in the 2019 Mobile Mini Sun Cup against Phoenix Rising FC. The match ended in a loss for Portland with a final score of 0–1 and Sebastián Blanco being sent off in the 90th minute.

On February 22, Portland acquired $100,000 in Targeted Allocation Money (TAM) in 2019 and $50,000 in General Allocation Money (GAM) in 2010 to D.C. United for a 2019 international slot.

On February 23, Portland defeated Real Salt Lake 3–0 in their final preseason match in the 2019 Mobile Mini Sun Cup. Goals were scored by Jeremy Ebobisse in the 5th minute, assisted by Sebastián Blanco, Blanco in the 44th minute, assisted by Diego Valeri and Andy Polo, and Polo in the 72nd minute assisted by Valeri.

=== March ===
On March 2, Portland kicked off their 2019 MLS Campaign by traveling to Commerce City, Colorado to take on Colorado Rapids at DICK'S Sporting Goods Park. The match called for an orange Adidas ball due to the growing amount of snow on the pitch throughout the match. Goals were scored by Diego Valeri in the 29th minute. Sebastián Blanco scored in the 45+1 minute, and an own goal from Deklan Wynne would put the Portland up by three; however a late goal from Andre Shinyahiki in the final moments of stoppage time would level Colorado and the match ended in a 3–3 draw.

On March 10, Portland traveled to Los Angeles, California to face Los Angeles FC at Banc of California Stadium. Diego Chara received two yellows, one in the 35th minute and the other in the 72nd minute which would lead to a red card. The lone scorer was Jeremy Ebobisse in the 29th minute, assisted by Diego Valeri. Portland would fall 1–4, making it their only and largest loss of the season so far.

On March 17, Portland traveled to Cincinnati, Ohio to play against FC Cincinnati in their first league game, and their MLS home opener, at Nippert Stadium. Portland without Diego Chara due to a red card last match, ended up getting shutout 0–3 while Larrys Mabiala would be carded twice, sending him off in the 70th minute.

On March 19, Portland midfielders Cristhian Paredes was called up for the Paraguay national team and Andy Polo was called up for the Peru national team. Additionally, forward Jeremy Ebobisse, defender Marco Farfan and midfielder Eryk Williamson have been named to the U.S. U-23 Men's National Team.

On March 30, Edgar "RCTID_Thiago" Guerrero competed in the 2019 eMLS Cup held at PAX East in Boston, Massachusetts. Guerrero defeated San Jose Earthquakes Alan "CaliSCG" Ortega with a 3–1 win in the knockout round but fell to FC Dallas' AlanAvi in the 2019 eMLS Cup Western Conference Semifinals with a score of 1–0.

On March 31, Portland traveled to Carson, California to play against LA Galaxy at Dignity Health Sports Park. Larrys Mabiala was not available due to a red card last match. LA was awarded and successfully converted two penalties, both taken by Zlatan Ibrahimović. Jeremy Ebobisse was the lone scorer, assisted by Diego Valeri and David Guzmán. Portland ended up losing 2–1.

=== April ===
On April 6, Portland traveled to San Jose, California to play San Jose Earthquakes at Avaya Stadium. Diego Valeri attempted to convert an awarded penalty but was unsuccessful from a save from goalkeeper, Daniel Vega. Portland's losing streak continues after a 0–3 defeat, placing them on both the bottom of the Western Conference and Supporters' Shield table.

On April 11, Portland revealed their 2019 Parley kit that will be used during the April 20 match against Columbus Crew SC.

On April 13, Portland traveled to Frisco, Texas to play FC Dallas at Toyota Stadium. Portland was defeated 1–2 with the only goalscorer being Cristhian Paredes, assisted by Sebastián Blanco and Diego Chará.

On April 20, Portland traveled to Columbus, Ohio to play against former Portland head coach Caleb Porter and the Columbus Crew SC at MAPFRE Stadium. After seven matches, Portland finally found their first win of the season with a final score of 3–1. The first goal was scored by Larrys Mabiala, assisted by Diego Valeri. The second goal was scored by Jeremy Ebobisse, assisted by Sebastián Blanco. The final goal was scored by Jorge Moreira, assisted by Sebastián Blanco and Cristhian Paredes.

On April 27, Portland traveled to Toronto, Ontario, Canada to play against Toronto FC at BMO Field. Portland was successful at defeated Toronto with a score of 2–1. The first goal was scored by Bill Tuiloma, assisted by Diego Valeri in the 22nd minute. The second goal scorer was Jeremy Ebobisse, assisted by Sebastián Blanco and Diego Valeri in the 70th minute.

=== May ===
On May 2, Bill Tuiloma was awarded goal of the week for week 9.

On May 4, Portland traveled to Sandy, Utah to face Real Salt Lake at Rio Tinto Stadium. Portland defeated Real Salt Lake with a final score of 2–1. Goals were scored by Sebastián Blanco in the 34th minute and the final goal scored by Diego Valeri in the 68th minute. Portland's win streak continues to three matches. Valeri's goal made him the ninth player in MLS to reach 70 goals and 70 assists.

On May 6, Portland traded defensive midfielder David Guzmán to Columbus Crew SC in exchange for a 2019 international roster slot. Shortly after, Portland announced the signing of their new Designated Player, Argentine forward Brian Fernández from Mexican club Necaxa.

On May 11, Portland traveled to Vancouver, B.C. to play their first Cascadia Cup rivalry match of the 2019 campaign against the Vancouver Whitecaps FC. Portland were defeated in a 0–1 shutout, ending their three-match win streak.

On May 15, Portland traveled to Houston, Texas to take on Houston Dynamo. Portland's newest Designated Player and forward Brian Fernández made his debut and scored within 11 minutes after he subbed. Portland would settle for a point on the road after a 1–1 draw.

On May 20, midfielder Andrés Flores was announced as a preliminary pick to the El Salvador national team for the 2019 CONCACAF Gold Cup.

On May 21, midfielder Eryk Williamson was announced to the U.S. Senior and U-23 Men's National Team preparation camp from May 26 to June 2 in Annapolis, Maryland.

On May 25, Portland concluded their long away campaign in Chester, Pennsylvania as they defeated Philadelphia Union 3–1. New striker Brian Fernández made his first start and captured his first brace with goals in the 31st minute assisted by Andy Polo, and the second in the 36th minute with assists from Diego Chara and Diego Valeri. The final goal was scored by Diego Valeri, assisted by Sebastián Blanco in the 87th minute. Portland now returns to Providence Park for their home opener of the 2019 MLS campaign on June 1.

On May 30, it was announced that Portland will travel to Tacoma, Washington where they will face Seattle Sounders FC at Cheney Stadium for the fourth round of the 2019 U.S. Open Cup.

=== June ===
On June 1, Portland hosted Los Angeles FC in front of a Providence Park record crowd of 25,218 for their home opener for the 2019 season. Portland was defeated with a score of 2–3. Goals were scored by Cristhian Paredes in the 46th minute and by Brian Fernández, assisted by Jeremy Ebobisse and Jorge Villafaña in the 84th minute.

On June 7, Portland midfielder Andrés Flores was called up for the El Salvador national team for the 2019 CONCACAF Gold Cup; meanwhile, midfielder Andy Polo was named to the Peru national team for the 2019 Copa América.

On June 9, Portland left back Marco Farfan and midfielder Eryk Williamson are called up for the U.S. U-23 Men's National Team for a domestic training camp from June 9 through 16 in Herriman, Utah.

On June 12, Portland traveled to Tacoma, Washington to play their first 2019 U.S. Open Cup match against Seattle Sounders FC in the fourth round at Cheney Stadium. Portland advanced with a 2–1 victory with both goals scored by Brian Fernández, assisted by Diego Valeri, Sebastián Blanco, and Jeremy Ebobisse.

On June 13, it was announced that Portland will host LA Galaxy in the round of 16 in the 2019 U.S. Open Cup.

On June 19, Portland hosted LA Galaxy in the Round of 16 of the 2019 U.S. Open Cup. Portland advanced with a 4–0 victory, marking their first clean sheet of the 2019 season. Goals were scored by Perry Kitchen (own goal) in the 28th minute, Brian Fernández in the 34th minute, Sebastián Blanco in the 37th Minute, and Jorge Moreira, assisted by Brian Fernández in the 82nd minute.

On June 20, Los Angeles Football Club defeated San Jose Earthquakes 3–1. This result means that Portland will travel to Banc of California Stadium for the quarterfinals of the 2019 U.S. Open Cup on July 10. Diego Chará was selected by Orlando City SC head coach James O'Connor to participate in the 2019 MLS All-Star game on July 29 against Atlético Madrid.

On June 22, Portland defeated Houston Dynamo at home with a final score of 4–0. Marvin Loría received his first start with the first team since joining from Portland Timbers 2. His start was promptly celebrated with Loría being the first goal scorer of the match in the 39th minute, assisted by Jorge Moreira and Diego Valeri. Valeri would successfully convert an awarded penalty in the 61st minute. Brian Fernández continued his goal streak by scoring in the 63rd minute, assisted by Diego Valeri. Finally, Jeremy Ebobisse would be the final scorer in the 75th minute, assisted by Valeri. Goalkeeper, Steve Clark would receive his second shutout, continuing his two match streak.

On June 24, Diego Valeri, Marvin Loría, and Brian Fernández were announced to Team of the Week: Week 16. Diego Valeri was announced as the Player of the Week for Week 16. Diego Chará was selected to the 2019 MLS All-Star Game roster for the match against Atlético Madrid on July 31, 2019.

On June 26, Portland traveled to Saputo Stadium to face Montreal Impact. With a mixed roster, Portland were defeated 1–2 with the only goal scorer being Tomás Conechny, assisted by Julio Cascante and Marvin Loría.

On June 30, Portland hosted and defeated FC Dallas 1–0. Brian Fernández set an MLS record with his fifth consecutive league goal. He scored in the 42nd minute with an assist from Sebastián Blanco.

=== July ===
On July 2, Portland announced the multiyear contract extensions of coaching staff members Giovanni Savarese, Carlos Llamosa, Miles Joseph, Guillermo “Memo” Valencia and Shannon Murray.

On July 7, Portland traveled to Yankee Stadium where they defeated New York City FC 1–0. The lone goalscorer was Sebastián Blanco in the 14th minute.

On July 10, Portland traveled to Los Angeles, California to play against Los Angeles Football Club at Banc of California Stadium for the quarterfinal round of the 2019 U.S. Open Cup. Portland emerged victorious with a late goal in the 84th minute by Jeremy Ebobisse making the final score 1–0. Portland will now travel to Allianz Field in St Paul, Minnesota to play Minnesota United FC on August 7.

On July 15, Portland drew Colorado Rapids at home to a final score of 2–2. Marco Farfan was subbed out early due to an injury in 10th minute, Tommy Smith scored an own goal for the Timbers, Julio Cascante was sent off with a straight red in the 55th minute for a serious foul, and Diego Valeri successfully converted a penalty in the 63rd minute.

On July 16, Portland and Lucas Melano mutually agree to terminate his contract.

On July 18, Portland hosted Orlando City SC to a 1–1 draw. The lone goal scorer was in the 82nd minute by Jeremy Ebobisse.

On July 21, Portland traveled to CenturyLink Field in Seattle, Washington to face local rival Seattle Sounders FC. Portland ended Seattle's undefeated home streak with a final score of 2–1, with both goals from Brian Fernández in the 20th and 51st minute.

On July 27, Portland hosted LA Galaxy for the final match of July. Portland dominated Los Angeles to a 4–0 victory. Cristhian Paredes captured a brace with goals in the 37th (assisted by: Jorge Moreira and Diego Valeri) and in the 81st minute (assisted by: Jorge Villafaña). Diego Valeri scored in the 41st minute (assisted by: Sebastián Blanco). Jeremy Ebobisse scored the final goal in the 88th minute (assisted by: Jorge Villafaña and Renzo Zambrano). Dairon Asprilla was issued a straight red in the 90+4 minute for violent conduct. LA Galaxy's Efrain Álvarez and Diego Polenta were also issued straight reds for violent conduct.

On July 29, Portland's secondary goalkeeper Jeff Attinella underwent successful surgery to repair anterior labrum tear in right shoulder. He is placed on the Season-ending injury list.

=== August ===
On August 4, Portland traveled to Allianz Field in St. Paul, Minnesota to face Minnesota United FC. During the final minutes of stoppage time, Minnesota was awarded a penalty after a VAR review citing Larrys Mabiala with a handball in the box. Minnesota would successfully convert the penalty claiming a late 0–1 victory. Portland will remain in Minnesota for their semifinal match of the 2019 U.S. Open Cup on Wednesday against the same club.

On August 7, Portland's 2019 U.S. Open Cup run came to an end as they were defeated 2–1 by Minnesota United FC with the lone goal being scored by Brian Fernández (assisted by Jeremy Ebobisse) in the 45+2 minute.

On August 10, Portland hosted Vancouver Whitecaps FC for their third of four Cascadia Cup matches. Portland defeated the Whitecaps 3–1, placing them currently first in Cascadia Cup standings. Goals were scored by Sebastián Blanco (assisted by: Diego Valeri) in the 28th minute, Marvin Loría (assisted by: Sebastián Blanco) in the 55th minute, and Jeremy Ebobisse (assisted by: Tomás Conechny and Diego Valeri) in the 90th minute.

On August 14, Portland continued their ten home match run as they faced Chicago Fire. Portland defeated Chicago 3–2 after Fire midfielder Aleksandar Katai was sent off for a high elbow on Julio Cascante in the half hour mark. The first goal was scored by Jorge Moreira in the 11th minute. Brian Fernández captured a brace with goals in 21st minute (assisted by: Cristhian Paredes and Jorge Moreira) and again in the 88th minute (assisted by: Tomás Conechny and Diego Valeri).

On August 18, Portland was defeated at home to Atlanta United FC to a final score of 0–2.

On August 23, Portland hosted their rivals, Seattle Sounders FC to the final Cascadia Cup regular season meeting of the year. Portland's supporters, the Timbers Army performed a silent protest until the 33rd minute, showing their upset on the Iron Front ban. Portland was defeated 1–2 and Seattle won the 2019 Cascadia Cup. The lone goalscorer was Diego Valeri in the 54th minute.

On August 31, Portland hosted Real Salt Lake to a 1–0 victory. The lone goalscorer was Diego Valeri (assisted by: Andrés Flores).

=== September ===
On September 3, three Portland midfielders were called up for their national teams. Cristhian Paredes was called up for friendlies with Paraguay against Japan on September 5 and Jordan on September 10. Renzo Zambrano was called up by Venezuela for a friendly against Colombia on September 10. Andrés Flores was called up by El Salvador for CONCACAF Nations League matches against St. Lucia and the Dominican Republic on September 7 and 10.

On September 7, Portland defeated Sporting Kansas City 2–1 at home with a late stoppage time goal. The goal scorers were Jeremy Ebobisse in the 83rd minute, and Brian Fernández (assisted By: Diego Valeri and Tomás Conechny) in the 90+4 minute.

On September 15, Portland was defeated at home by D.C. United 0–1. Bill Tuiloma scored an own goal.

On September 18, Portland was defeated at home by New York Red Bulls with a final score of 0–2.

On September 22, Portland drew 0–0 at home against Minnesota United FC.

On September 25, Portland drew 2–2 at home against New England Revolution, ending their ten match home streak.

On September 29, Portland traveled for their final away match to face Kansas City FC. Brian Fernández was sent off in the 36th minute for violent conduct. The final score was 2–2 with goals scored by Sebastián Blanco in the 29th minute and successfully converted penalty in the 85th minute by Dairon Asprilla. This draw keeps Portland in the running for the 2019 MLS Cup playoffs; however, they will need a victory or draw for their final match to guarantee a spot.

=== October ===
On October 6, Portland hosted and defeated San Jose Earthquakes with a score of 3–1 for their final regular season match, granting them entry into the 2019 MLS Cup Playoffs. The goal scorers were Larrys Mabiala (assisted by: Jorge Villafaña and Dairon Asprilla) in the 29th minute. Dairon Asprilla in the 59th minute, and Sebastián Blanco in the 75th minute. Steve Clark was awarded the Timbers Army player of the year. Portland will travel to face Real Salt Lake on October 19.

On October 9, two Portland midfielders were called up for their national teams. Cristhian Paredes was called up by Paraguay for friendlies against Serbia on Oct 10 and Slovakia on October 13. Renzo Zambrano was called up by Venezuela for friendlies against Bolivia and Trinidad and Tobago on October 10 and 14.

On October 19, Portland fell 1–2 to Real Salt Lake at Rio Tinto Stadium, thus ending their 2019 MLS campaign. The lone goalscorer was Dairon Asprilla in the 47th minute (assisted by: Sebastián Blanco).

== Team kits ==
Supplier: Adidas / Sponsor: Alaska Air

Primary	Secondary

== Coaching staff and front office ==
=== Executive staff ===
Position	Staff
Chief executive officer	Merritt Paulson
President of business	Mike Golub
GM and president of soccer	Gavin Wilkinson
Sr. VP, operations	Ken Puckett
Sr. VP, ticket sales and services	Joe Cote
Sr. VP, business operations and marketing	Cory Dolich
Sr. VP, corporate partnerships	Todd Spear
VP, communications	Chris Metz
VP, broadcasting	Matt Smith
VP, guest services and event sales	Ashley Highsmith
VP, community impact	Kristel Wissel
VP, finance	Jessica Guenther

Last updated: March 19, 2019

=== Coaching staff ===
Position	Staff
Head coach	Giovanni Savarese
Assistant coach	Miles Joseph
Assistant coach	Carlos Llamosa
Goalkeeping coach	Guillermo Valencia
Video/data analyst	Shannon Murray
Head athletic trainer	Jon MacGregor, ATC
Athletic trainer	Taichi Kitagawa, ATC
Athletic trainer	Alex Margarito, ATC
Director, sports science	Nick Milanos
Performance specialist	Charles Burdick
Performance physical therapist	Matthew Weston

Last updated: January 24, 2019
Source: Portland Timbers

=== Stadiums ===
Ground (capacity and dimensions)	Providence Park (25,218 / 110x75 yards)
Training ground	Adidas Training Facility

Source: Providence Park

== Squad information ==
=== First team ===
As of July 16, 2019

No.	Name	Nat	Positions	Since	Date of birth (age)	Signed from	Games	Goals
Goalkeepers
1	Jeff Attinella (SEIL)	(United States)	GK	2017	September 29, 1988 (age 37)	(United States) Minnesota United FC	32	0
12	Steve Clark	(United States)	GK	2018	April 29, 1986 (age 40)	free transfer	1	0
31	Aljaž Ivačič (INT)	(Slovenia)	GK	2019	December 29, 1993 (age 32)	(Slovenia) NK Olimpija Ljubljana	0	0
43	Kendall McIntosh	(United States)	GK	2017	January 24, 1994 (age 32)	(United States) Portland Timbers 2	1	0
Defenders
2	Jorge Moreira (INT) (L)	(Paraguay)	RB	2019	February 1, 1990 (age 36)	(Argentina) River Plate	16	1
4	Jorge Villafaña	(United States)	LB	2018	September 16, 1989 (age 36)	(Mexico) Santos Laguna	85	2
5	Claude Dielna	(France)	DF	2019	December 14, 1987 (age 38)	(United States) New England Revolution	0	0
16	Zarek Valentin	(United States)	LB / RB	2016	August 6, 1991 (age 35)	(Norway) FK Bodø/Glimt	63	1
18	Julio Cascante (INT)	(Costa Rica)	CB	2018	October 3, 1993 (age 32)	(Costa Rica) Deportivo Saprissa	16	0
25	Bill Tuiloma (INT)	(New Zealand)	DF / CDM / CB	2017	March 27, 1995 (age 31)	free transfer	30	2
26	Modou Jadama	(The Gambia)	RB	2018	March 17, 1994 (age 32)	free transfer	1	0
32	Marco Farfan (HG)	(United States)	LB	2017	November 12, 1998 (age 27)	(United States) Portland Timbers 2	16	0
50	Larrys Mabiala (INT)	(Democratic Republic of the Congo)	CB	2017	October 8, 1987 (age 38)	(Turkey) Kayserispor	67	6
Midfielders
8	Diego Valeri (DP) (C)	(Argentina)	CAM	2013	March 15, 1988 (age 38)	(Argentina) Lanús	218	80
10	Sebastián Blanco (DP)	(Argentina)	MF / FW	2017	March 5, 1990 (age 36)	(Argentina) San Lorenzo	91	24
14	Andrés Flores	(El Salvador)	CDM	2018	August 31, 1990 (age 36)	free transfer	21	0
19	Tomás Conechny (INT) (L)	(Argentina)	MF	2018	March 30, 1998 (age 28)	(Argentina) San Lorenzo	13	1
21	Diego Chara	(Colombia)	CDM	2011	April 5, 1986 (age 40)	(Colombia) Deportes Tolima	224	7
22	Cristhian Paredes (L)	(Paraguay)	CDM	2018	May 18, 1998 (age 28)	(Mexico) América	(34 on Loan)	(5 on Loan)
30	Eryk Williamson (HG)	(United States)	MF	2018	June 11, 1997 (age 29)	(United States) D.C. United	0	0
40	Renzo Zambrano (INT)	(Venezuela)	MF	2018	August 26, 1994 (age 32)	(United States) Portland Timbers 2	0	0
Forwards
7	Brian Fernández (DP) (INT)	(Argentina)	FW	2019	September 26, 1994 (age 31)	(Mexico) Necaxa	11	8
11	Andy Polo	(Peru)	ST / W	2018	September 29, 1994 (age 31)	(Mexico) Morelia	(14 on Loan)	(0 on Loan)
17	Jeremy Ebobisse	(United States)	FW	2017	February 14, 1997 (age 29)	(United States) 2017 MLS SuperDraft	53	11
27	Dairon Asprilla	(Colombia)	RW / LW / FW	2015	May 25, 1992 (age 34)	(Colombia) Atlético Nacional	76	5
28	Foster Langsdorf (HG)	(United States)	FW	2018	December 14, 1995 (age 30)	N/A	0	0
44	Marvin Loría (INT)	(Costa Rica)	FW	2018	April 24, 1997 (age 29)	(United States) Portland Timbers 2	8	1

- (HG) = Homegrown Player
- (GA) = Generation Adidas Player
- (DP) = Designated Player
- (INT) = Player using International Roster Slot
- (L) = On Loan to the Timbers
- (LO) = Loaned out to another club
- (SEIL) = Season-ending Injury List

=== eMLS team ===
As of December 11, 2018

Name	Nat	Since	Gamer tag
Players
Edgar Guerrero	United States	2018	RCTID_Thiago

== Competitions ==
=== Competitions overview ===
Competition	Record								Start round	First match	Last match	Final position (Conference)
Competition	G	W	D	L	GF	GA	GD	Win %				
Major League Soccer *	34	14	7	13	52	49	+3	41.18	1	March 2, 2019	October 6, 2019	11th (6th Western)
MLS Cup Playoffs	1	0	0	1	1	2	−1	0.00	First round	October 19, 2019	October 19, 2019	Round 1
U.S. Open Cup	4	3	0	1	8	3	+5	75.00	4	June 12, 2019	August 7, 2019	Semifinals
Total	39	17	7	15	61	54	+7	43.59				

Updated to match played October 19, 2019
Source: Competitions

=== Major League Soccer ===
==== Preseason ====
===== Costa Rica =====
Win Draw Loss Upcoming fixture

February 4, 2019 1	Saprissa	0–4	Portland Timbers	San Rafael de Guatuso, Costa Rica
08:00 PST		Report	Asprilla 9'; Melano 32' 45+1'; Conechny 61'	Stadium: Sports Complex Fedefutbol-Plycem

February 7, 2019 2	Herediano	1–3	Portland Timbers	San Rafael de Guatuso, Costa Rica
08:25 PST	Pedroza 33' (pen.)	Report	Melano 31'; Flores 60'; Langsdorf 69'	Stadium: Sports Complex Fedefutbol-Plycem

===== Mobile Mini Sun Cup =====
Win Draw Loss Upcoming fixture

February 13, 2019 1	Portland Timbers	2–1	Seattle Sounders FC	Tucson, Arizona
18:00 PST	Valeri 40' (pen.); Ebobisse 88' (Asprilla); Flores (yellow card) 90'	Report	Bwana 33' (Vargas); A. Roldan (yellow card) 36'; Vargas (yellow card) 50'	Stadium: Kino North Stadium

February 16, 2018 2	New York Red Bulls	2–2	Portland Timbers	Tucson, Arizona
16:00 PST	White 13' (Epps); Duncan (yellow card) 26'; Nealis 35' (Epps)	Report	Blanco (yellow card) 26'; Guzmán (yellow card) 55'; Ebobisse 62'; Valeri 70' (pen.); Melano (yellow card) 90'	Stadium: Kino North Stadium

February 20, 2018 3	Portland Timbers	0–1	Phoenix Rising FC	Tucson, Arizona
17:00 PST	Dielna (yellow card) 70'; Blanco (red card) 90'	Report	Dia (yellow card) 71'; Jahn 87' (Flemmings); Mala (red card) 90'	Stadium: Kino North Stadium

February 23, 2018 4	Portland Timbers	3–0	Real Salt Lake	Tucson, Arizona
16:00 PST	Ebobisse 5' (Polo); Blanco 44' (Valeri); Chará (yellow card) 65'; Polo 72' (Valeri); Valeri (yellow card) 74'	Report	Beckerman (yellow card) 68'	Stadium: Kino North Stadium

==== MLS Regular season ====
===== Western Conference =====
2019 MLS Western Conference standings
Pos	Team	Pld	W	L	T	GF	GA	GD	Pts	Qualification
4	Minnesota United FC	34	15	11	8	52	42	+10	53	MLS Cup First Round
5	LA Galaxy	34	16	15	3	56	55	+1	51	MLS Cup First Round
6	Portland Timbers	34	14	13	7	49	48	+1	49	MLS Cup First Round
7	FC Dallas	34	13	12	9	48	46	+2	48	MLS Cup First Round
8	San Jose Earthquakes	34	13	16	5	51	52	−1	44	

Source: MLS
Rules for classification: 1) points; 2) total wins; 3) total goal differential; 4) total goals scored; 5) disciplinary points; 6) away goal differential; 7) away goals scored; 8) home goals scored; 9) home goal differential; 10) coin toss or drawing of lots

===== Overall standings =====
2019 MLS regular season standings
Pos	Team	Pld	W	L	T	GF	GA	GD	Pts
9	Toronto FC	34	13	10	11	57	52	+5	50
10	D.C. United	34	13	10	11	42	38	+4	50
11	Portland Timbers	34	14	13	7	52	49	+3	49
12	New York Red Bulls	34	14	14	6	53	51	+2	48
13	FC Dallas	34	13	12	9	54	46	+8	48

Source: MLS
Rules for classification: 1) points; 2) total wins; 3) total goal differential; 4) total goals scored; 5) disciplinary points; 6) away goals scored; 7) away goal differential; 8) coin toss or drawing of lots

===== Matches =====
Win Draw Loss Upcoming fixture

March 2, 2019 1	Colorado Rapids	3–3	Portland Timbers	Commerce City, Colorado
15:00 PST	Kamara; Sjöberg (red card) 27'; Feilhaber 46'; Shinyashiki 90+4'	Report	Chará (yellow card) 18'; Valeri 29'; Cascante (yellow card) 32'; Blanco 45+1' (Valeri); Wynne 66' (o.g.)	Stadium: Dick's Sporting Goods Park; Attendance: 12,717; Referee: Drew Fischer

March 10, 2019 2	Los Angeles FC	4–1	Portland Timbers	Los Angeles, California
16:30 PST	Kaye 14' (Vela); Atuesta (yellow card) 17'; Ramirez 45'; Diomande 65'; Carlos Vela	Report	Ebobisse 29' (Valeri); Chará (yellow card) 35' (yellow-red card) 72'; Valentin (yellow card) 47'	Stadium: Banc of California Stadium; Attendance: 22,003; Referee: Jair Marrufo

March 17, 2019 3	FC Cincinnati	3–0	Portland Timbers	Cincinnati, Ohio
14:00 PST	Waston 15' (Bertone), (yellow card) 46'; Cruz 61'; Deplagne 63' (Mattocks); Bertone (yellow card) 90'	Report	Mabiala (yellow card) 45+4' (yellow-red card) 70'; Melano (yellow card) 65'	Stadium: Nippert Stadium; Attendance: 32,250; Referee: Ismail Elfath

March 31, 2019 4	LA Galaxy	2–1	Portland Timbers	Carson, California
18:00 PST	Ibrahimovic 33' (pen.), 65' (pen.), (yellow card) 80'; dos Santos (yellow card) 68'; Lletget (yellow card) 75'	Report	Ebobisse; Blanco (yellow card) 59'; Valeri (yellow card) 65'	Stadium: Dignity Health Sports Park; Attendance: 23,820; Referee: Ted Unkel

April 6, 2019 5	San Jose Earthquakes	3–0	Portland Timbers	San Jose, California
17:00 PST	Salinas 15' (Espinoza); López (yellow card) 28'; Hoesen 33'; Espinoza 34'; Eriksson (yellow card) 36'; Cummings (yellow card) 55'	Report	Mabiala (yellow card) 26'	Stadium: Avaya Stadium; Attendance: 16,233; Referee: Drew Fischer

April 13, 2019 6	FC Dallas	2–1	Portland Timbers	Frisco, Texas
17:00 PST	Ferreira 9'; Ziegler 60' (pen.); Pomykal (yellow card) 65'	Report	Chará (yellow card) 51'; Paredes	Stadium: Toyota Stadium; Attendance: 14,376; Referee: Marcos de Oliveira

April 20, 2019 7	Columbus Crew SC	1–3	Portland Timbers	Columbus, Ohio
16:30 PST	P. Santos 69'	Report	Valentin (yellow card) 25'; Mabiala 31' (Valeri); Ebobisse 35' (Blanco); Conechny (yellow card) 78'; Blanco (yellow card) 89'; Moreira	Stadium: Mapfre Stadium; Attendance: 11,707; Referee: Chris Penso

April 27, 2019 8	Toronto FC	1–2	Portland Timbers	Toronto, Ontario, Canada
12:00 PST	Osorio 20'; Mavinga (yellow card) 64'	Report	Tuiloma 22' (Valeri); Moreira (yellow card) 66'; Ebobisse; Chará (yellow card) 87'	Stadium: BMO Field; Attendance: 24,832; Referee: Alex Chilowicz

May 4, 2019 9	Real Salt Lake	1–2	Portland Timbers	Salt Lake City, Utah
18:00 PST	Toia (yellow card) 48'; Johnson; Besler (yellow card) 77'; Herrera (yellow card) 78'	Report	Blanco 34'; Moreira (yellow card) 45+3'; Valeri 68'	Stadium: Rio Tinto Stadium; Attendance: 18,066; Referee: Ramy Touchan

May 10, 2019 10	Vancouver Whitecaps FC	1–0	Portland Timbers	Vancouver, British Columbia, Canada
19:00 PST	Montero 9' (Teibert); Godoy (yellow card) 61'	Report	Blanco (yellow card) 28'; Paredes (yellow card) 48'; Chará (yellow card) 90'	Stadium: BC Place; Attendance: 18,356; Referee: Allen Chapman

May 15, 2019 11	Houston Dynamo	1–1	Portland Timbers	Houston, Texas
17:30 PST	Manotas; Figueroa (yellow card) 47'	Report	Zambrano (yellow card) 42'; Fernández 77' (Blanco); Blanco (yellow card) 79'	Stadium: BBVA Compass Stadium; Attendance: 13,327; Referee: Ted Unkel

May 25, 2019 12	Philadelphia Union	1–3	Portland Timbers	Chester, Pennsylvania
16:30 PST	Przybylko; Elliott (yellow card) 85'	Report	Clark (yellow card) 22'; Fernández 31' (Polo), Valeri 87' (Blanco); Chará (yellow card) 90+3'	Stadium: Talen Energy Stadium; Attendance: 18,474; Referee: Drew Fischer

June 1, 2019 13	Portland Timbers	2–3	Los Angeles FC	Portland, Oregon
19:30 PST	Mabiala (yellow card) 45+2'; Paredes 46'; Tuiloma (yellow card) 58'; Fernández, (yellow card) 90+9'; Blanco (yellow card) 85'	Report	Vela 6'; Rossi; Blessing 54' (Harvey); Atuesta (yellow card) 88'; Diomande (yellow card) 90+9'	Stadium: Providence Park; Attendance: 25,218; Referee: Robert Sibiga

June 22, 2019 14	Portland Timbers	4–0	Houston Dynamo	Portland, Oregon
20:00 PST	Cascante (yellow card) 12'; Chara (yellow card) 31'; Loría; Valeri (yellow card) 54', (goal) 61' (pen.); Fernández 63' (Valeri); Ebobisse 75' (Valeri)	Report	Martínez (yellow card) 16'; Peña (yellow card) 34'; Vera (yellow card) 47'	Stadium: Providence Park; Attendance: 25,218; Referee: Alan Kelly

June 26, 2019 15	Montreal Impact	2–1	Portland Timbers	Montreal, Quebec, Canada
16:30 PST	Okwonkwo 28' (Sagna), 66' (Taïder); Shome (yellow card) 32'; Cabrera (yellow card) 90+3'	Report	Conechny, (yellow card) 57'; Farfan (yellow card) 77'	Stadium: Saputo Stadium; Attendance: 15,167; Referee: Rubiel Vazquez

June 30, 2019 16	Portland Timbers	1–0	FC Dallas	Portland, Oregon
20:00 PST	Fernández 42' (Blanco); Moreira (yellow card) 88'	Report	Badji (yellow card) 32'; Pomykal (yellow card) 50'	Stadium: Providence Park; Attendance: 25,218; Referee: Allen Chapman

July 7, 2019 17	New York City FC	0–1	Portland Timbers	New York City, New York
15:30 PST	Sweat (yellow card) 81'; Ofori (yellow card) 88'	Report	Blanco 14', (yellow card) 44'; Dielna (yellow card) 40'; Farfan (yellow card) 44'; Asprilla (yellow card) 45+2'; Valentin (yellow card) 45+3'	Stadium: Yankee Stadium; Attendance: 18,363; Referee: Ted Unkel

July 13, 2019 18	Portland Timbers	2–2	Colorado Rapids	Portland, Oregon
20:00 PST	Valeri (yellow card) 21', (goal) 63' (pen.); Smith 27' (o.g.); Cascante (red card) 55'; Zambrano (yellow card) 77'; Ebobisse (yellow card) 89'	Report	Smith (yellow card) 22'; Lewis 28'; Rubio (yellow card) 59'; Nicholson	Stadium: Providence Park; Attendance: 25,218; Referee: Kevin Stott

July 18, 2019 19	Portland Timbers	1–1	Orlando City SC	Portland, Oregon
19:00 PST	Fernández (yellow card) 9'; Mabiala (yellow card) 67'; Ebobisse 82'; Dielna (yellow card) 89'	Report	Patiño 44', (yellow card) 77'; Rosell (yellow card) 50'; Méndez (yellow card) 86'	Stadium: Providence Park; Attendance: 25,218; Referee: Joseph Dickerson

July 21, 2019 20	Seattle Sounders FC	1–2	Portland Timbers	Seattle, Washington
18:30 PST	Ruidíaz 50'; Leerdam (yellow card) 66'	Report	Fernández 20',, (yellow card) 82'; Moreira (yellow card) 84'; Chara (yellow card) 90+9'	Stadium: CenturyLink Field; Attendance: 50,072; Referee: Drew Fischer

July 27, 2019 21	Portland Timbers	4–0	LA Galaxy	Portland, Oregon
19:30 PST	Paredes (yellow card) 16',, 81' (Villafaña); Zambrano (yellow card) 24'; Valeri 41' (Blanco), (yellow card) 42'; Ebobisse; Asprilla (red card) 90+4'	Report	Polenta (yellow card) 58', (red card) 90+4'; Rolf Feltscher (yellow card) 61'; Zlatan Ibrahimovic (yellow card) 76'; Efraín Álvarez (red card) 84'	Stadium: Providence Park; Attendance: 25,218; Referee: Allen Chapman

August 4, 2019 22	Minnesota United FC	1–0	Portland Timbers	Saint Paul, Minnesota
13:00 PST	Boxall (yellow card) 75'; Finlay 90+4' (pen.)	Report	Mabiala (yellow card) 39'; Clark (yellow card) 50'; Chará (yellow card) 53'; Cascante (yellow card) 58'	Stadium: Allianz Field; Attendance: 19,726; Referee: Chris Penso

August 10, 2019 23	Portland Timbers	3–1	Vancouver Whitecaps FC	Portland, Oregon
20:00 PST	Blanco 28' (Valeri); Cascante (yellow card) 45+5'; Loría 55' (Blanco), (yellow card) 59'; Ebobisse	Report	Vair 38'; Gody (yellow card) 65'; Nerwinski (yellow card) 84'	Stadium: Providence Park; Attendance: 25,218; Referee: Ted Unkel

August 14, 2019 24	Portland Timbers	3–2	Chicago Fire	Portland, Oregon
20:00 PST	Moreira 11'; Fernández, Loría (yellow card) 27'; Ebobisse (yellow card) 81'	Report	Katai (red card) 30'; Nikolic 74'; Calvo (yellow card) 79'; Sapong 90+2' (Frankowski)	Stadium: Providence Park; Attendance: 25,218; Referee: Silviu Petrescu

August 18, 2019 25	Portland Timbers	0–2	Atlanta United FC	Portland, Oregon
19:00 PST	Moreira (yellow card) 42'	Report	Pirez 14'; Larentowicz (yellow card) 24'; Pogba (yellow card) 33'; Barco (yellow card) 45+1'; Martínez 46' (Gressel)	Stadium: Providence Park; Attendance: 25,218; Referee: Armando Villarreal

August 23, 2019 26	Portland Timbers	1–2	Seattle Sounders FC	Portland, Oregon
19:00 PST	Valeri 54'	Report	Roldan 22' (Ruidíaz); Ruidíaz 47' (Morris); Leerdam (yellow card) 53'; Jones (yellow card) 65'; Abdul-Salaam (yellow card) 84'; Frei (yellow card) 90+1'	Stadium: Providence Park; Attendance: 25,218; Referee: Jair Marrufo

August 31, 2019 27	Portland Timbers	1–0	Real Salt Lake	Portland, Oregon
19:30 PST	Valeri 16' (Flores); Dielna (yellow card) 66'; Zambrano (red card) 90+6'	Report		Stadium: Providence Park; Attendance: 25,218; Referee: Nima Saghafi

September 7, 2019 28	Portland Timbers	2–1	Sporting Kansas City	Portland, Oregon
19:30 PST	Polo (yellow card) 40'; Eboisse 83', (yellow card) 86'; Fernández	Report	Gerso (yellow card) 45'; Zusi (yellow card) 58'; Feilhaber 65' (Sallói)	Stadium: Providence Park; Attendance: 25,218; Referee: Alex Chilowicz

September 15, 2019 29	Portland Timbers	0–1	D.C. United	Portland, Oregon
12:30 PST	Williamson (yellow card) 46'	Report	Tuiloma 25' (o.g.); Rooney (yellow card) 64'	Stadium: Providence Park; Attendance: 25,218; Referee: Drew Fischer

September 18, 2019 30	Portland Timbers	0–2	New York Red Bulls	Portland, Oregon
19:30 PST	Chará (yellow card) 76'; Moreira (yellow card) 90+3'	Report	Duncan; Royer 90+6' (pen.)	Stadium: Providence Park; Attendance: 25,218; Referee: Alan Kelly

September 22, 2019 31	Portland Timbers	0–0	Minnesota United FC	Portland, Oregon
13:00 PST	Valentin (yellow card) 78'	Report		Stadium: Providence Park; Attendance: 25,218; Referee: Robert Sibiga

September 25, 2019 32	Portland Timbers	2–2	New England Revolution	Portland, Oregon
19:30 PST	Ebobisse 49' (Villafaña), 81' (Blanco); Mabiala (yellow card) 88'; Blanco (yellow card) 90+8'	Report	Mancienne (yellow card) 67'; Fagundez (yellow card) 68'; Bou; Gil 90+7' (pen.)	Stadium: Providence Park; Attendance: 25,218; Referee: Ramy Touchan

September 29, 2019 33	Sporting Kansas City	2–2	Portland Timbers	Kansas City, Kansas
16:30 PST	Németh; Gutiérrez (yellow card) 35'; Espinoza (red card) 38'; Sallói 46'; Baráth (yellow card) 75'; Melia (yellow card) 81'; Sánchez (red card) 84'	Report	Blanco 29', (yellow card) 65'; Fernández (yellow card) 35' (red card) 36'; Zambrano (yellow card) 60'; Valentin (yellow card) 72'; Asprilla 85' (pen.)	Stadium: Children's Mercy Park; Attendance: 17,281; Referee: Allen Chapman

October 6, 2019 34	Portland Timbers	3–1	San Jose Earthquakes	Portland, Oregon
13:00 PST	Mabiala; Asprilla 59'; Chará (yellow card) 65'; Blanco 75'; Moreira (yellow card) 79'; Loría (yellow card) 85'	Report	Wondolowski; Jungwirth (yellow card) 43'; Judson (yellow card) 51'; Kashia (yellow card) 74'; Ríos (yellow card) 90+3'	Stadium: Providence Park; Attendance: 25,218; Referee: Rubiel Vazquez

The 2019 MLS schedule was released on January 7, 2019.

===== Results by round =====
Matchday	1	2	3	4	5	6	7	8	9	10	11	12	13	14	15	16	17	18	19	20	21	22	23	24	25	26	27	28	29	30	31	32	33	34
Stadium	A	A	A	A	A	A	A	A	A	A	A	A	H	H	A	H	A	H	H	A	H	A	H	H	H	H	H	H	H	H	H	H	A	H
Result	D	L	L	L	L	L	W	W	W	L	D	W	L	W	L	W	W	D	D	W	W	L	W	W	L	L	W	W	L	L	D	D	D	W

Updated to match(es) played on October 6, 2019. Source: Major League Soccer
A = Away; H = Home; W = Win; D = Draw; L = Loss

===== Results by location =====
Overall								Home						Away					
Pld	W	D	L	GF	GA	GD	Pts	W	D	L	GF	GA	GD	W	D	L	GF	GA	GD
34	14	7	13	52	49	+3	49	8	4	5	29	20	+9	6	3	8	23	29	−6

Last updated: October 6, 2019.
Source: Major League Soccer

==== Cascadia Cup ====
===== Standings =====
Pos	Team	GP	W	L	D	GF	GA	GD	Pts
1	Seattle Sounders FC	4	2	1	1	4	3	+1	7
2	Portland Timbers	4	2	2	0	6	5	+1	6
3	Vancouver Whitecaps FC	4	1	2	1	2	4	-2	4

Last updated: August 30, 2019.
Source: Cascadia Cup

===== Matches =====
Win Draw Loss Upcoming fixture

May 10, 2019 1 (MLS 10)	Vancouver Whitecaps FC	1–0	Portland Timbers	Vancouver, British Columbia, Canada
19:00 PST	Montero 9' (Teibert); Godoy (yellow card) 61'	Report	Blanco (yellow card) 28'; Paredes (yellow card) 48'; Chará (yellow card) 90'	Stadium: BC Place; Attendance: 18,356; Referee: Allen Chapman

July 21, 2019 2 (MLS 20)	Seattle Sounders FC	1–2	Portland Timbers	Seattle, Washington
18:30 PST	Ruidíaz 50'; Leerdam (yellow card) 66'	Report	Fernández 20',, (yellow card) 82'; Moreira (yellow card) 84'; Chara (yellow card) 90+9'	Stadium: CenturyLink Field; Attendance: 50,072; Referee: Drew Fischer

August 10, 2019 3 (MLS 23)	Portland Timbers	3–1	Vancouver Whitecaps FC	Portland, Oregon
20:00 PST	Blanco 28' (Valeri); Cascante (yellow card) 45+5'; Loría 55' (Blanco), (yellow card) 59'; Ebobisse	Report	Vair 38'; Gody (yellow card) 65'; Nerwinski (yellow card) 84'	Stadium: Providence Park; Attendance: 25,218; Referee: Ted Unkel

August 23, 2019 4 (MLS 26)	Portland Timbers	1–2	Seattle Sounders FC	Portland, Oregon
19:00 PST	Valeri 54'	Report	Roldan 22' (Ruidíaz); Ruidíaz 47' (Morris); Leerdam (yellow card) 53'; Jones (yellow card) 65'; Abdul-Salaam (yellow card) 84'; Frei (yellow card) 90+1'	Stadium: Providence Park; Attendance: 25,218; Referee: Jair Marrufo

=== MLS Cup Playoffs ===
Win Draw Loss Upcoming fixture

October 19, 2019 First Round	Real Salt Lake	2–1	Portland Timbers	Sandy, Utah
21:00 PST	Kreilach 28' (Baird); Savarino (yellow card) 44', (goal) 87'; Beckerman (yellow card) 57'	Report	Blanco (yellow card) 39'; Asprilla 47' (Blanco)	Stadium: Rio Tinto Stadium; Attendance: 17,452; Referee: Ismail Elfath

=== U.S. Open Cup ===
Win Draw Loss Upcoming fixture

June 12, 2019 Fourth round	Seattle Sounders FC	1–2	Portland Timbers	Tacoma, Washington
19:30 PST	Roldan (yellow card) 30'; Rodríguez 44'; Bruin (yellow card) 45+2'		Fernández 6' (Blanco),	Stadium: Cheney Stadium; Attendance: 6,280; Referee: Alex Chilowicz

June 19, 2019 Round of 16	Portland Timbers	4–0	LA Galaxy	Portland, Oregon
20:00 PST	Kitchen 28' (o.g.); Fernández 34'; Blanco 37'; Moreira 82' (Fernández)	Report	Carrasco (yellow card) 45+2'	Stadium: Providence Park; Attendance: 16,235; Referee: Victor Rivas

July 10, 2019 Quarter-finals	Los Angeles FC	0–1	Portland Timbers	Los Angeles, California
19:30 PST	Segura (yellow card) 62'; Diomande (yellow card) 70'	Report	Blanco (yellow card) 34'; Mabiala (yellow card) 66'; Moreira (yellow card) 68'; Ebobisse 84'	Stadium: Banc of California Stadium; Attendance: 18,947; Referee: Alan Kelly

August 7, 2019 Semi-finals	Minnesota United FC	2–1	Portland Timbers	Saint Paul, Minnesota
17:00 PST	Quintero 22' (pen.); Greguš (yellow card) 26'; Boxall (yellow card) 37'; Opara (yellow card) 51'; Toye 64' (Molino)	Report	Fernández 45+2' (Ebobisse); Dielna (yellow card) 76'; Valentin (yellow card) 90+3'	Stadium: Allianz Field; Attendance: 15,073; Referee: Ismail Elfath

== Player and staff transactions ==
Per league and club policy, terms of the deals are not disclosed except Targeted Allocation Money, General Allocation Money, draft picks, and international rosters spots.

=== Transfers in ===
Date	Position	Player	Previous club	TAM	GAM	Notes	Source
Winter
December 10, 2018	FW	(Costa Rica) Marvin Loría	(United States) Portland Timbers 2	N/A	N/A	Will use International Roster Slot	
December 10, 2018	MF	(Venezuela) Renzo Zambrano	(United States) Portland Timbers 2	N/A	N/A	Will use International Roster Slot	
January 16, 2019	DF	(France) Claude Dielna	(United States) New England Revolution	N/A	$100,000		
January 18, 2019	GK	(Slovenia) Aljaž Ivačič	(Slovenia) NK Olimpija Ljubljana	N/A	N/A	Will use International Roster Slot. Transfer fee being renegotiated due to injury.	
May 6, 2019	FW	(Argentina) Brian Fernández	(Mexico) Necaxa	N/A	N/A	Will use Designated Player slot.	
Summer

=== Loans in ===
Date	Position	Player	Previous club	TAM	GAM	Notes	Source
Winter
February 20, 2019	RB	(Paraguay) Jorge Moreira	(Argentina) River Plate	N/A	N/A	On loan with purchase option. Will use International Roster Slot.	
Summer

=== Loans out ===
Date	Position	Player	Loaned club	TAM	GAM	Notes	Source
Winter
Summer

=== Transfers out ===
Date	Position	Player	Destination club	TAM	GAM	Notes	Source
Winter
December 10, 2018	FW	(Sweden) Samuel Armenteros	(Italy) Benevento	N/A	N/A	Loan expires on December 31, 2018	
December 10, 2018	MF	(England) Jack Barmby		N/A	N/A	Out of contract	
December 10, 2018	GK	(United States) ~~Steven Clark~~		N/A	N/A	~~Out of contract/Negotiating~~ re-signed	
December 10, 2018	GK	(New Zealand) Jake Gleeson		N/A	N/A	Out of contract/Free agent	
December 10, 2018	MF	(Costa Rica) Roy Miller		N/A	N/A	Out of contract/Free agent	
December 10, 2018	MF	(Kenya) Lawrence Olum		N/A	N/A	Out of contract	
December 10, 2018	MF	(Argentina) ~~Tomás Conechny~~		N/A	N/A	~~Out of contract/Negotiating~~ re-signed	
December 10, 2018	MF	(El Salvador) ~~Andrés Flores~~		N/A	N/A	~~Out of contract/Negotiating~~ re-signed	
December 27, 2018	RB	(Jamaica) Alvas Powell	(United States) FC Cincinnati	N/A	$250,000	Traded for General Allocation Money	
January 10, 2019	CB	(England) Liam Ridgewell		N/A	N/A	Mutually agree to part ways	
May 6, 2019	MF	(Costa Rica) David Guzmán	(United States) Columbus Crew SC	N/A	N/A	Traded for a 2019 international slot	
Summer
July 16, 2019	FW	(Argentina) Lucas Melano		N/A	N/A	Mutually agree to terminate contract	

=== Contract extensions ===
Date	Position	Player	Year signed	Extension	Notes	Source
December 10, 2018	LB / RB	(United States) Zarek Valentin	2016	Unknown	Offered a new contract	
December 10, 2018	FW	(United States) Jeremy Ebobisse	2017	Unknown	Contract exercised	
December 10, 2018	RB	(The Gambia) Modou Jadama	2018	Unknown	Contract exercised	
December 10, 2018	CB	(New Zealand) Bill Tuiloma	2017	Unknown	Contract exercised	
December 10, 2018	FW	(United States) Foster Langsdorf	2018	Unknown	Contract exercised	
December 10, 2018	GK	(United States) Kendall McIntosh	2017	Unknown	Contract exercised	

=== 2018 MLS Re-Entry Draft picks ===
Stage	Position	Player	Previous club	Notes	Source
1 (#22)	-	-	-	Passed	
2 (#22)	-	-	-	Passed	

=== 2019 MLS SuperDraft picks ===
Round	Position	Player	College	Other club	Notes	Source
1 (#23)	FW	(United States) Ryan Sierakowski	(United States) Michigan State	(United States) Chicago FC United		
2 (#47)	DF	(Germany) Lennart Hein	(United States) Saint Louis			
3 (#71)	DF	(United States) Francesco Moore	(United States) Indiana			
4 (#95)	MF	(Venezuela) David Zalzman	(United States) Memphis			

=== Staff in ===
Date	Name	Position	Previous club	Previous role	Notes	Source
December 13, 2018	(United States) Ned Grabavoy	Club Technical Director	(United States) Portland Timbers	Player		

=== Staff out ===
Date	Name	Former role	New club	New role	Notes	Source

=== Staff extensions ===
Date	Staff	Position	Year signed	Extension	Notes	Source
July 2, 2019	(Venezuela) Giovanni Savarese	Head coach	2018	Multiyear	Offered a contract extension	
July 2, 2019	(Colombia) Carlos Llamosa	Assistant coach	2018	Multiyear	Offered a contract extension	
July 2, 2019	(United States) Miles Joseph	Assistant coach	2018	Multiyear	Offered a contract extension	
July 2, 2019	(Colombia) Guillermo “Memo” Valencia	Goalkeeper coach	2018	Multiyear	Offered a contract extension	
July 2, 2019	(United States) Shannon Murray	Video/Data Analyst	2018	Multiyear	Offered a contract extension	

=== National Team participation ===
Date	Player	Positions	National Team	Notes	Source
December 20, 2018	(United States) Jeremy Ebobisse	FW	United States	Called up for January training camp	
January 18, 2019	(Costa Rica) David Guzmán	MF	Costa Rica	Called up for match against USA	
January 18, 2019	(Costa Rica) Marvin Loría	MF	Costa Rica	Called up for match against USA	
March 19, 2019	(Paraguay) Cristhian Paredes	MF	Paraguay	Called up for matches against Peru and Mexico	
March 19, 2019	(Peru) Andy Polo	MF	Peru	Called up for matches against Peru and El Salvador	
March 19, 2019	(United States) Jeremy Ebobisse	FW	United States U-23	Called up for matches against Egypt and the Netherlands	
March 19, 2019	(United States) Marco Farfan	DF	United States U-23	Called up for matches against Egypt and the Netherlands	
March 19, 2019	(United States) Eryk Williamson	MF	United States U-23	Called up for matches against Egypt and the Netherlands	
May 20, 2019	(El Salvador) Andrés Flores	MF	El Salvador	Called up preliminary roster for 2019 CONCACAF Gold Cup	
May 21, 2019	(United States) Eryk Williamson	MF	United States U-23 / United States	Called up for combined preparation camp	
June 7, 2019	(El Salvador) Andrés Flores	MF	El Salvador	Called up for the 2019 CONCACAF Gold Cup	
June 7, 2019	(Peru) Andy Polo	MF	Peru	Called up for the 2019 Copa América	
June 9, 2019	(United States) Marco Farfan	DF	United States U-23	Called into U.S. U-23 National Team camp from June 9–16 in Herriman, Utah	
June 9, 2019	(United States) Eryk Williamson	MF	United States U-23	Called into U.S. U-23 National Team camp from June 9–16 in Herriman, Utah	
September 3, 2019	(Paraguay) Cristhian Paredes	MF	Paraguay	Called up for friendlies against Japan on Sep 5 and Jordan on Sep 10	
September 3, 2019	(Venezuela) Renzo Zambrano	MF	Venezuela	Called up for friendly against Colombia on Sep 10	
September 3, 2019	(El Salvador) Andrés Flores	MF	El Salvador	Called up for CONCACAF Nations League matches against St. Lucia and the Dominican Republic on Sep 7 and 10	
October 9, 2019	(Paraguay) Cristhian Paredes	MF	Paraguay	Called up for friendlies against Serbia on Oct 10 and Slovakia on Oct 13	
October 9, 2019	(Venezuela) Renzo Zambrano	MF	Venezuela	Called up for friendly against Bolivia and Trinidad and Tobago on Oct 10 and 14	

=== 2019 MLS All-Star participation ===
Date	Player	Positions	Opponent club	Selection process	Source
June 24, 2019	(Colombia) Diego Chará	CDM	(Spain) Atlético Madrid	Picked by head coach James O’Connor	

== Honors and awards ==
=== MLS Player of the Week ===
Week	Player	Ref
16	(Argentina) Diego Valeri	

=== MLS Goal of the Week ===
Week	Result	Player	Ref
8	Nominated	(Paraguay) Jorge Moreira	
9	Won	(New Zealand) Bill Tuiloma	
14	Nominated	(Argentina) Brian Fernández	
16	Nominated	(Costa Rica) Marvin Loría	
16	Nominated	(United States) Jeremy Ebobisse	
21	Nominated	(Argentina) Diego Valeri	
26	Nominated	(Argentina) Diego Valeri	
31	Nominated	(Argentina) Sebastián Blanco	

=== MLS Team of the Week ===
Week	Area	Player/Manager	Ref
8	Pitch	(Paraguay) Jorge Moreira	
9	Pitch	(Argentina) Sebastián Blanco	
9	Bench	(United States) Jeremy Ebobisse	
10	Pitch	(United States) Steve Clark	
13	Pitch	(Argentina) Brian Fernández	
13	Bench	(Colombia) Diego Chará	
16	Pitch	(Argentina) Diego Valeri	
16	Pitch	(Costa Rica) Marvin Loría	
16	Bench	(Argentina) Brian Fernández	
17	Pitch	(Colombia) Diego Chará	
18	Pitch	(United States) Steve Clark	
18	Bench	(Democratic Republic of the Congo) Larrys Mabiala	
19	Bench	(United States) Steve Clark	
20	Pitch	(Argentina) Brian Fernández	
20	Pitch	(Democratic Republic of the Congo) Larrys Mabiala	
21	Pitch	(Venezuela) Giovanni Savarese	
21	Pitch	(Paraguay) Cristhian Paredes	
21	Bench	(Argentina) Diego Valeri	
23	Pitch	(Venezuela) Renzo Zambrano	
24	Bench	(Argentina) Brian Fernández	
26	Pitch	(United States) Jorge Villafaña	
27	Pitch	(Argentina) Diego Valeri	
27	Pitch	(Colombia) Diego Chará	
27	Bench	(United States) Eryk Williamson	
30	Pitch	(United States) Jeremy Ebobisse	
31	Pitch	(United States) Sebastián Blanco	
31	Pitch	(Democratic Republic of the Congo) Larrys Mabiala	

== Statistics ==
=== Appearances and discipline ===
Numbers in parentheses denote appearances as a substitute.

(T2) = Players called up from Portland Timbers 2 for short-term contracts.

No.	Pos.	Name	MLS				MLS Playoffs				U.S. Open Cup				Total			
No.	Pos.	Name	Apps	Booked	(yellow card) (yellow-red card)	Sent off (straight red)	Apps	Booked	(yellow card) (yellow-red card)	Sent off (straight red)	Apps	Booked	(yellow card) (yellow-red card)	Sent off (straight red)	Apps	Booked	(yellow card) (yellow-red card)	Sent off (straight red)
1	GK	(United States) Jeff Attinella	10	0	0	0	0	0	0	0	0	0	0	0	10	0	0	0
2	DF	(Paraguay) Jorge Moreira	25 (1)	7	0	0	1	0	0	0	3	1	0	0	29 (1)	8	0	0
4	DF	(United States) Jorge Villafaña	21 (1)	0	0	0	1	0	0	0	1	0	0	0	23 (1)	0	0	0
5	DF	(France) Claude Dielna	12 (3)	3	0	0	0 (1)	0	0	0	2 (1)	1	0	0	14 (5)	4	0	0
7	FW	(Argentina) Brian Fernández	16 (3)	4	0	1	0	0	0	0	4	0	0	0	20 (3)	4	0	1
8	MF	(Argentina) Diego Valeri	28 (2)	4	0	0	0 (1)	0	0	0	1 (3)	0	0	0	29 (6)	4	0	0
10	MF	(Argentina) Sebastián Blanco	28 (2)	8	0	0	1	1	0	0	4	1	0	0	33 (2)	10	0	0
11	FW	(Peru) Andy Polo	12 (7)	1	0	0	1	0	0	0	0	0	0	0	13 (7)	1	0	0
12	GK	(United States) Steve Clark	24	2	0	0	1	0	0	0	4	0	0	0	29	2	0	0
14	DF	(El Salvador) Andrés Flores	10 (5)	0	0	0	0	0	0	0	0 (2)	0	0	0	10 (7)	0	0	0
16	DF	(United States) Zarek Valentin	17 (3)	5	0	0	0	0	0	0	3	1	0	0	20 (3)	6	0	0
17	FW	(United States) Jeremy Ebobisse	25 (9)	3	0	0	1	0	0	0	4	0	0	0	30 (9)	3	0	0
18	DF	(Costa Rica) Julio Cascante	16 (6)	4	0	1	0	0	0	0	2	0	0	0	18 (6)	4	0	1
19	MF	(Argentina) Tomás Conechny	2 (14)	2	0	0	0	0	0	0	1 (2)	0	0	0	3 (16)	2	0	0
21	MF	(Colombia) Diego Chará	29 (1)	11	1	0	1	0	0	0	4	0	0	0	34 (1)	11	1	0
22	MF	(Paraguay) Cristhian Paredes	19 (3)	2	0	0	1	0	0	0	3 (1)	0	0	0	23 (4)	2	0	0
25	DF	(New Zealand) Bill Tuiloma	21 (3)	1	0	0	1	0	0	0	0	0	0	0	22 (3)	1	0	0
26	DF	(The Gambia) Modou Jadama	1	0	0	0	0	0	0	0	0	0	0	0	1	0	0	0
27	MF	(Colombia) Dairon Asprilla	7 (6)	1	0	1	1	0	0	0	1 (1)	0	0	0	9 (7)	1	0	1
28	FW	(United States) Foster Langsdorf	0 (2)	0	0	0	0	0	0	0	0	0	0	0	0 (2)	0	0	0
30	MF	(United States) Eryk Williamson	3 (4)	1	0	0	0	0	0	0	0 (1)	0	0	0	3 (5)	1	0	0
31	GK	(Slovenia) Aljaž Ivačič	0	0	0	0	0	0	0	0	0	0	0	0	0	0	0	0
32	DF	(United States) Marco Farfan	3	2	0	0	0	0	0	0	0 (1)	0	0	0	3 (1)	2	0	0
33	DF	(Democratic Republic of the Congo) Larrys Mabiala	21	6	1	0	1	0	0	0	4	1	0	0	26	6	1	0
43	GK	(United States) Kendall McIntosh	0	0	0	0	0	0	0	0	0	0	0	0	0	0	0	0
40	MF	(Venezuela) Renzo Zambrano	9 (1)	4	0	1	0	0	0	0	1	0	0	0	10 (1)	4	0	1
44	FW	(United States) Marvin Loría	8 (10)	3	0	0	0 (1)	0	0	0	1	0	0	0	9 (11)	3	0	0
Players who were transferred/waived from the club during active season or on loan
20	MF	(Costa Rica) David Guzmán	4 (1)	0	0	0	0	0	0	0	0	0	0	0	4 (1)	0	0	0
26	FW	(Argentina) Lucas Melano	1 (7)	1	0	0	0	0	0	0	0	0	0	0	1 (7)	1	0	0

Last updated: October 19, 2019.
Source: Competitions

=== Goalkeeper stats ===
The list is sorted by total minutes played then by jersey number.

No.	Player	MLS				MLS Playoffs				U.S. Open Cup				Total			
No.	Player	MIN	GA	GAA	SV	MIN	GA	GAA	SV	MIN	GA	GAA	SV	MIN	GA	GAA	SV
12	(United States) Steve Clark	1,980	21	0.95	75	0	0	0.00	0	360	3	0.75	16	2,250	24	0.96	91
1	(United States) Jeff Attinella	900	24	2.40	41	0	0	0.00	0	0	0	0.00	0	900	24	2.40	41
31	(Slovenia) Aljaž Ivačič	0	0	0.00	0	0	0	0.00	0	0	0	0.00	0	0	0	0.00	0
43	(United States) Kendall McIntosh	0	0	0.00	0	0	0	0.00	0	0	0	0.00	0	0	0	0.00	0
	TOTALS	2,880	45	1.41	116	0	0	0.00	0	360	3	0.75	16	3,240	48	1.33	135

Last updated: September 25, 2019.
Source: Competitions

=== Top scorers ===
The list is sorted by shirt number when total goals are equal.

Rnk	Pos	No.	Player	MLS	MLS Cup Playoffs	U.S. Open Cup	Total
1	FW	7	(Argentina) Brian Fernández	11	0	4	15
2	FW	17	(United States) Jeremy Ebobisse	11	0	1	12
3	MF	8	(Argentina) Diego Valeri	8	0	0	8
4	MF/FW	10	(Argentina) Sebastián Blanco	6	0	1	7
5	MF	22	(Paraguay) Cristhian Paredes	4	0	0	4
7	DF	2	(Paraguay) Jorge Moreira	2	0	1	3
7	FW	27	(Colombia) Dairon Asprilla	2	1	0	3
9	DF	33	(Democratic Republic of the Congo) Larrys Mabiala	2	0	0	2
9	MF	44	(Costa Rica) Marvin Loría	2	0	0	2
11	MF	19	(Argentina) Tomás Conechny	1	0	0	1
11	DF	25	(New Zealand) Bill Tuiloma	1	0	0	1
Own goals				2	0	1	3
TOTALS				52	1	8	61

Last updated: October 19, 2019.
Source: Competitions

=== Top assists ===
The list is sorted by shirt number when total assists are equal.

Rnk	Pos	No.	Player	MLS	MLS Cup Playoffs	U.S. Open Cup	Total
1	MF	8	(Argentina) Diego Valeri	16	0	1	17
2	MF/FW	10	(Argentina) Sebastián Blanco	10	1	1	12
3	DF	4	(United States) Jorge Villafaña	5	0	0	5
4	DF	2	(Paraguay) Jorge Moreira	4	0	0	4
6	FW	17	(United States) Jeremy Ebobisse	1	0	2	3
6	MF	19	(Argentina) Tomás Conechny	3	0	0	3
9	FW	7	(Argentina) Brian Fernández	1	0	1	2
9	MF	21	(Colombia) Diego Chará	2	0	0	2
9	MF	22	(Paraguay) Cristhian Paredes	2	0	0	2
16	MF	11	(Peru) Andy Polo	1	0	0	1
16	MF	14	(El Salvador) Andrés Flores	1	0	0	1
16	DF	18	(Costa Rica) Julio Cascante	1	0	0	1
16	MF	20	(Costa Rica) David Guzmán	1	0	0	1
16	MF	27	(Colombia) Dairon Asprilla	1	0	0	1
16	MF	40	(Venezuela) Renzo Zambrano	1	0	0	1
16	MF	44	(Costa Rica) Marvin Loría	1	0	0	1
TOTALS				51	1	5	57

Last updated: October 19, 2019.
Source: Competitions

=== Shutouts ===
The list is sorted by shirt number when total clean sheets are equal.

Rnk	No.	Player	MLS	MLS Cup Playoffs	U.S. Open Cup	Total
1	12	(United States) Steve Clark	6	0	2	8
TOTALS			6	0	2	8

Last updated: October 19, 2019.
Source: Competitions

=== Summary ===
Games played	39 (34 MLS) (1 MLS Playoffs) (4 Open Cup)
Games won	17 (14 MLS) (3 Open Cup)
Games drawn	7 (7 MLS)
Games lost	15 (13 MLS) (1 MLS Playoffs) (1 Open Cup)
Goals scored	61 (52 MLS) (1 MLS Playoffs) (8 Open Cup)
Goals conceded	54 (49 MLS) (2 MLS Playoffs) (3 Open Cup)
Goal difference	+7 (+3 MLS) (-1 MLS Playoffs) (+5 Open Cup)
Clean sheets	8 (6 MLS) (2 Open Cup)
Yellow cards	80 (74 MLS) (1 MLS Playoffs) (5 Open Cup)
Red cards	6 (6 MLS)
Most appearances	(United States) Jeremy Ebobisse (39 appearances)
Top scorer	(Argentina) Brian Fernández (15 goals)
Top assists	(Argentina) Diego Valeri (17 assists)
Top shutouts	(United States) Steve Clark (8 shutouts)
Winning percentage	Overall: 17/39 (43.59%)

Last updated: October 19, 2019.
Source: Competitions
