= 2015–16 Deportivo Saprissa season =

Saprissa
2015–16 season
- Manager: Carlos Watson
- Stadium: Estadio Ricardo Saprissa Aymá
- Costa Rican FPD: Invierno: 3rd Verano: 2nd
- Invierno Tournament: Champions
- Vernao Tournament: Semifinals
- Costa Rican Cup: Second round
- CONCACAF Champions League (15–16): Group stage
- Average home league attendance: 10,815 (A)
| Home colours | Away colours |

The 2015–16 Deportivo Saprissa season was the club's 81st season of existence, and the club's 67th season in the top tier of Costa Rican football. Saprissa played in the Costa Rican Primera División, as well as participated in the 2015 Costa Rican Cup, and the 2015–16 CONCACAF Champions League.

In the Primera División, Saprissa finished 2nd during the Invierno season and 3rd during the Verano season. In each season's tournament, Saprissa won the Invierno tournament and was eliminated in the semifinals of the Verano tournament. Saprissa was eliminated in the first round of the Costa Rican Cup and finished 2nd in their group of the Champions League, failing to reach the knockout stage.

== Club ==
| Squad No. | Name | Nationality | Position(s) | Since | Date of birth (age) | Signed from | Games played | Goals scored |
Goalkeepers
| 1 | Danny Carvajal | (Costa Rica) | GK | 2013 | January 8, 1987 (age 39) | (Costa Rica) San Carlos | 31 | 0 |
| 12 | Kevin Briceño | (Costa Rica) | GK | 2014 | October 21, 1991 (age 35) | (Costa Rica) Uruguay | 0 | 0 |
| 22 | Jaime Penedo | (Panama) | GK | 2016 | September 26, 1981 (age 45) | (United States) LA Galaxy | 9 | 0 |
Defenders
| 2 | Aubrey David | (Trinidad and Tobago) | DF | 2016 | November 11, 1990 (age 35) | (Kazakhstan) Shakhter Karagandy | 10 | 2 |
| 3 | Gabriel Badilla | (Costa Rica) | DF | 2010 | June 30, 1984 (age 42) | (United States) New England Revolution | 219 | 16 |
| 5 | Francisco Calvo | (Costa Rica) | DF | 2015 | July 8, 1992 (age 34) | (Costa Rica) Herediano | 26 | 3 |
| 6 | Heiner Mora | (Costa Rica) | DF | 2014 | June 20, 1984 (age 42) | (Costa Rica) Belén | 3 | 0 |

Note: Flags indicate national team as defined under FIFA eligibility rules; some limited exceptions apply. Players may hold more than one non-FIFA nationality.

| No. | Pos. | Nation | Player |
|---|---|---|---|
| 1 | GK | CRC | Danny Carvajal |
| 2 | DF | TTO | Aubrey David |
| 3 | DF | CRC | Gabriel Badilla |
| 5 | DF | CRC | Francisco Calvo |
| 6 | DF | CRC | Heiner Mora |
| 7 | FW | CRC | Mynor Escoe |
| 8 | MF | CRC | David Guzmán |
| 9 | FW | CRC | Hansell Arauz |
| 11 | MF | CRC | Marvin Angulo |
| 12 | GK | CRC | Kevin Briceño |
| 13 | DF | PAN | Adolfo Machado (Captain) |
| 15 | MF | CRC | Deyver Vega |
| 17 | DF | USA | Ramón Del Campo |
| 18 | DF | CRC | Erick Cabalceta |
| 19 | DF | CRC | Irving Calderón |
| 20 | MF | CRC | Néstor Monge |
| 22 | GK | PAN | Jaime Penedo |
| 23 | MF | CRC | Juan Bustos Golobio |
| 24 | FW | CRC | David Ramírez |
| 26 | FW | CRC | Daniel Colindres |
| 27 | MF | CRC | Dylan Flores |
| 28 | DF | CRC | Joseph Mora |
| 29 | DF | CRC | Luis Flores |
| 30 | MF | CRC | Ulises Segura |
| 31 | DF | CRC | Roy Miller |

== Competitions ==
=== Costa Rican FPD ===
==== Invierno ====
===== Table =====
| Pos | Team | Pld | W | D | L | GF | GA | GD | Pts | Qualification |
|---|---|---|---|---|---|---|---|---|---|---|
| 1 | Alajuelense | 22 | 13 | 6 | 3 | 42 | 17 | +25 | 45 | Advances to the Semifinals |
| 2 | Herediano | 22 | 13 | 4 | 5 | 31 | 15 | +16 | 43 | Advances to the Semifinals |
| 3 | Deportivo Saprissa | 22 | 11 | 6 | 5 | 45 | 19 | +26 | 39 | Advances to the Semifinals |
| 4 | Limón | 22 | 10 | 7 | 5 | 39 | 33 | +6 | 37 | Advances to the Semifinals |
| 5 | Cartaginés | 22 | 10 | 6 | 6 | 31 | 32 | −1 | 36 | |

Updated to match(es) played on 21 September 2015. Source: Soccerway.com
Rules for classification: 1) points; 2) goal difference; 3) goals scored; 4) head-to-head points; 5) head-to-head goal difference; 6) head-to-head goals scored; 7) draw

===== First stage =====
| 2 August 2015 1 | Belén F.C. | 0–2 | Deportivo Saprissa | Heredia |
| 15:00 CT (UTC−06:00) | | Report | Vega 9'; Rodríguez 15' | Stadium: Rosabal Cordero; Attendance: 577; Referee: Medardo Quesada |

| 9 August 2015 2 | Deportivo Saprissa | 2–2 | Santos de Guápiles | San José |
| 11:00 CT (UTC−06:00) | Rodríguez 39', 43' | Report | Núñez 48'; Francis 66' | Stadium: Ricardo Saprissa; Attendance: 15.691; Referee: Randall Poveda |

| 12 August 2015 3 | A.D. Carmelita | 0–3 | Deportivo Saprissa | Morera Soto |
| 20:00 CT (UTC−06:00) | | Report | Guzmán 36'; Rodríguez 52'; Vega 82' |

| 16 August 2015 4 | Deportivo Saprissa | 0–0 | C.S. Herediano | San José |
| 17:00 CT (UTC−06:00) | | Report | | Stadium: Ricardo Saprissa |

| 23 August 2015 5 | Pérez Zeledón | 0–1 | Deportivo Saprissa |
| 11:00 CT (UTC−06:00) | | Report |

| 29 August 2015 6 | C.S. Uruguay de Coronado | 2–0 | Deportivo Saprissa |
| 20:00 CT (UTC−06:00) | | Report |

| 29 November 2015 7 | Deportivo Saprissa | 2–3 | C.S. Cartaginés | San José |
| 11:00 CT (UTC−06:00) | | Report | | Stadium: Ricardo Saprissa |

| 23 September 2015 8 | Universidad de Costa Rica | 2–2 | Deportivo Saprissa |
| 20:00 CT (UTC−06:00) | | Report |

| 13 September 2015 9 | Deportivo Saprissa | 1–2 | L.D. Alajuelense | San José |
| 17:00 CT (UTC−06:00) | | Report | | Stadium: Ricardo Saprissa |

| 20 September 2015 10 | Deportivo Saprissa | 3–0 | Limón F.C. | San José |
| 11:00 CT (UTC−06:00) | | | | Stadium: Ricardo Saprissa |

| 27 September 2015 11 | Municipal Liberia | 1–1 | Deportivo Saprissa |
| 11:00 CT (UTC−06:00) |

| 2 December 2015 12 | Deportivo Saprissa | 3–0 | Belén F.C. | San José |
| 20:00 CT (UTC−06:00) | | | | Stadium: Nacional |

| 22 November 2015 13 | Santos de Guápiles | 0–4 | Deportivo Saprissa |
| 15:30 CT (UTC−06:00) |

| 25 November 2015 14 | Deportivo Saprissa | 3–0 | A.D. Carmelita | San José |
| 20:00 CT (UTC−06:00) | | | | Stadium: Ricardo Saprissa |

| 17 October 2015 15 | C.S. Herediano | 0–0 | Deportivo Saprissa |
| 20:00 CT (UTC−06:00) |

| 25 October 2015 16 | Deportivo Saprissa | 5–0 | Pérez Zeledón | San José |
| 11:00 CT (UTC−06:00) | | | | Stadium: Ricardo Saprissa |

| 28 October 2015 17 | Deportivo Saprissa | 3–1 | C.S. Uruguay de Coronado | San José |
| 20:00 CT (UTC−06:00) | | | | Stadium: Ricardo Saprissa |

| 1 November 2015 18 | C.S. Cartaginés | 3–3 | Deportivo Saprissa |
| 11:00 CT (UTC−06:00) |

| 4 November 2015 19 | Deportivo Saprissa | 1–0 | Universidad de Costa Rica | San José |
| 11:00 CT (UTC−06:00) | | | | Stadium: Ricardo Saprissa |

| 8 November 2015 20 | L.D. Alajuelense | 1–0 | Deportivo Saprissa |
| 12:10 CT (UTC−06:00) |

| 6 December 2015 21 | Limón F.C. | 2–1 | Deportivo Saprissa |
| 13:30 CT (UTC−06:00) |

| 9 December 2015 22 | Deportivo Saprissa | 5–0 | Municipal Liberia | San José |
| 15:00 CT (UTC−06:00) | | | | Stadium: Ricardo Saprissa |

===== Second stage =====
====== Semifinals ======
| 14 December 2015 First leg | Saprissa | 3–0 | Herediano | Tibás |
| | | | | Stadium: Estadio Ricardo Saprissa; Referee: Ricardo Montero |

| 18 December 2015 Second leg | Herediano | 2–0 (2–3 agg.) | Saprissa | Heredia |
| | | | | Stadium: Estadio Cordero; Referee: Randall Poveda |

====== Finals ======
| 20 December 2015 First leg | Saprissa | 2–0 | Alajuelense | Tibás |
| | | | | Stadium: Estadio Ricardo Saprissa; Referee: Hugo Cruz |

| 23 December 2015 Second leg | Alajuelense | 1–2 (1–4 agg.) | Saprissa | Alajuela |
| | | | | Stadium: Estadio Soto; Referee: Henry Bejarano |

==== Verano ====
===== First stage =====
| 17 January 2016 1 | Saprissa | 2–1 | Belén | Tibás |
| | Colindres 12'; Ramírez 39'; Machado (yellow card) 68'; Arauz (yellow card) 75' | Report | Torres 2' | Stadium: Estadio Ricardo Saprissa; Referee: Wálter Quesada |

| 24 January 2016 2 | Santos de Guápiles | 0–3 | Saprissa | Guápiles |
| 16:30 | | Report; Walkover | | Stadium: Estadio Ebal Rodríguez |

| 27 January 2016 3 | Saprissa | 4–0 | Carmelita | Tibás |
| 21:00 | Escoe 11'; Ramírez 21', 59'; Flores 87' | Report | | Stadium: Estadio Ricardo Saprissa; Referee: Randall Poveda |

| 30 January 2016 4 | Herediano | 2–0 | Saprissa | Heredia |
| | | | | Stadium: Estadio Cordero |

| 4 February 2016 5 | Saprissa | 0–1 | Pérez Zeledón | Tibás |
| | | | | Stadium: Estadio Ricardo Saprissa |

| 10 February 2016 6 | Saprissa | 3–0 | Uruguay | Tibás |
| | | | | Stadium: Estadio Ricardo Saprissa |

| 14 February 2016 7 | Cartaginés | 1–4 | Saprissa | Cartago |
| | | | | Stadium: Estadio Ivankovich |

| 17 February 2016 8 | Saprissa | 3–0 | UCR | Tibás |
| | | | | Stadium: Estadio Ricardo Saprissa |

| 21 February 2016 9 | Alajuelense | 1–0 | Saprissa | Alajuela |
| | | | | Stadium: Estadio Soto |

| 24 February 2016 10 | Limón | 1–2 | Saprissa | Limón |
| | | | | Stadium: Estadio Juán Gobán |

| 28 February 2016 11 | Saprissa | 2–1 | Municipal Liberia | Tibás |
| | | | | Stadium: Estadio Ricardo Saprissa |

| 6 March 2016 12 | Belén | 3–0 | Saprissa | Belén |
| | | | | Stadium: Estadio Polideportivo |

| 10 March 2016 13 | Saprissa | 1–0 | Santos de Guápiles | Tibás |
| | | | | Stadium: Estadio Ricardo Saprissa |

| 13 March 2016 14 | Carmelita | 1–3 | Saprissa | Alajuela |
| | | | | Stadium: Estadio Soto |

| 20 March 2016 15 | Saprissa | 1–0 | Herediano | Tibás |
| Saprissa | | | | Stadium: Estadio Ricardo Saprissa |

| 2 April 2016 16 | Uruguay | 0–1 | Saprissa | Vázquez de Coronado |
| 22:00 | | | | Stadium: Estadio Municipal El Labrador |

| 6 April 2016 17 | Pérez Zeledón | 2–1 | Saprissa | San Isidro |
| 17:00 | | | | Stadium: Estadio Municipal Pérez Zeledón |

| 10 April 2016 18 | Saprissa | 2–0 | Cartaginés | Tibás |
| | | | | Stadium: Estadio Ricardo Saprissa |

| 13 April 2016 19 | UCR | 1–2 | Saprissa | San Pedro |
| | | | | Stadium: Estadio Ecológico |

| 17 April 2016 20 | Saprissa | 1–0 | Alajuelense | Tibás |
| | Guzmán (yellow card) 9' (yellow-red card) 66'; Colindres 49'; Penedo (yellow card) 83'; Calvo (yellow card) 89' | Report | Gutiérrez (yellow card) 3'; Salvatierra (yellow card) 68'; Rojas (yellow card) 81' | Stadium: Estadio Ricardo Saprissa; Referee: Randall Poveda |

| 20 April 2016 21 | Saprissa | 0–0 | Limón | Tibás |
| 19:00 | Miller (yellow card) 19'; Calvo (yellow card) 33' | Report | Espinoza (yellow card) 38'; Williams (yellow card) 55'; Salinas (yellow card) 65'; McLean (yellow card) 68'; Centeno (yellow card) 83' | Stadium: Estadio Ricardo Saprissa; Referee: Keylor Herrera |

| 24 April 2016 22 | Municipal Liberia | 1–1 | Saprissa | Liberia |
| 17:00 | García 6'; Moreira (yellow card) 25' | Report | Guzmán 45'; Flores (yellow card) 79' | Stadium: Estadio Briceño; Referee: Wálter Quesada |

===== Second stage =====
====== Semifinals ======
| 30 April 2016 First leg | Alajuelense | 2–0 | Saprissa | Alajuela |
| | Guevara (yellow card) 31'; Ortiz 45'; Cummings (yellow card) 55'; Gabas (yellow card) 67'; Salvatierra (yellow card) 79'; Claros (yellow card) 83'; Rojas 88' | Report | Machado (yellow card) 34'; David (yellow card) 34'; Mora (yellow card) 65'; Angulo (red card) 90' | Stadium: Estadio Soto; Referee: Randall Poveda |

| 4 May 2016 Second leg | Saprissa | 1–3 (1–5 agg.) | Alajuelense | Tibás |
| 22:00 | Martínez (yellow card) 12'; Colindres (yellow card) 67'; Miller (yellow card) 76'; Flores 84' | Report | Ortiz 20', 51' (yellow card) 67'; Valle (yellow card) 88'; Madrigal 90+7' (pen.) | Stadium: Estadio Ricardo Saprissa; Referee: Ricardo Montero |

=== Costa Rican Cup ===
| 9 July 2015 First round | Guanacasteca | 1–2 | Saprissa | Nicoya |
| 20:00 UTC−06:00 | | | | Stadium: Estadio Chorotega |

| 12 July 2015 Second round | Deportivo Saprissa | 0–0 (a.e.t.) (5–6 p) | Pérez Zeledón | San José |
| 20:00 UTC−06:00 | | | | Stadium: Estadio Ricardo Saprissa Aymá |

=== CONCACAF Champions League ===
==== Group stage ====
===== Table =====
| Pos | Team | Pld | W | D | L | GF | GA | GD | Pts | Qualification |
|---|---|---|---|---|---|---|---|---|---|---|
| 1 | (Mexico) Santos Laguna | 4 | 3 | 0 | 1 | 12 | 3 | +9 | 9 | Knockout stage |
| 2 | (Costa Rica) Saprissa | 4 | 2 | 0 | 2 | 8 | 9 | −1 | 6 | |
| 3 | (Trinidad and Tobago) W Connection | 4 | 1 | 0 | 3 | 2 | 10 | −8 | 3 | |

Source: CONCACAF
Rules for classification: Group stage tiebreakers

===== Results =====
| 20 August 2015 1 | Saprissa (Costa Rica) | 4–0 | (Trinidad and Tobago) W Connection | San Juan de Tibás |
| 22:00 UTC−06:00 | Vega 31'; Guzmán 40'; Ramírez 70'; Flores 90+3' | | | Stadium: Estadio Ricardo Saprissa Aymá; Referee: Drew Fischer (Canada) |

| 25 August 2015 2 | Saprissa (Costa Rica) | 2–1 | (Mexico) Santos Laguna | San Juan de Tibás |
| 22:00 UTC−06:00 | Angulo 55'; Araujo 78' (o.g.) | | Orozco 20' | Stadium: Estadio Ricardo Saprissa Aymá; Referee: Joel Aguilar (El Salvador) |

| 16 September 2015 3 | W Connection (Trinidad and Tobago) | 2–1 | (Costa Rica) Saprissa | Port of Spain |
| 20:00 UTC−06:00 | Frederick 34'; Jones 82' | | Colindres 38' | Stadium: Hasely Crawford Stadium; Referee: Héctor Rodríguez (Honduras) |

| 20 October 2015 4 | Santos Laguna (Mexico) | 6–1 | (Costa Rica) Saprissa | Torreón |
| 20:00 | Rabello 38'; Djaniny 52'; Mendoza 55'; Izquierdoz 67'; González 69'; Escoboza 90' | Report | Escoe 49' | Stadium: Estadio Corona |
