= David Guzmán =

Costa Rican football player (born 1990)

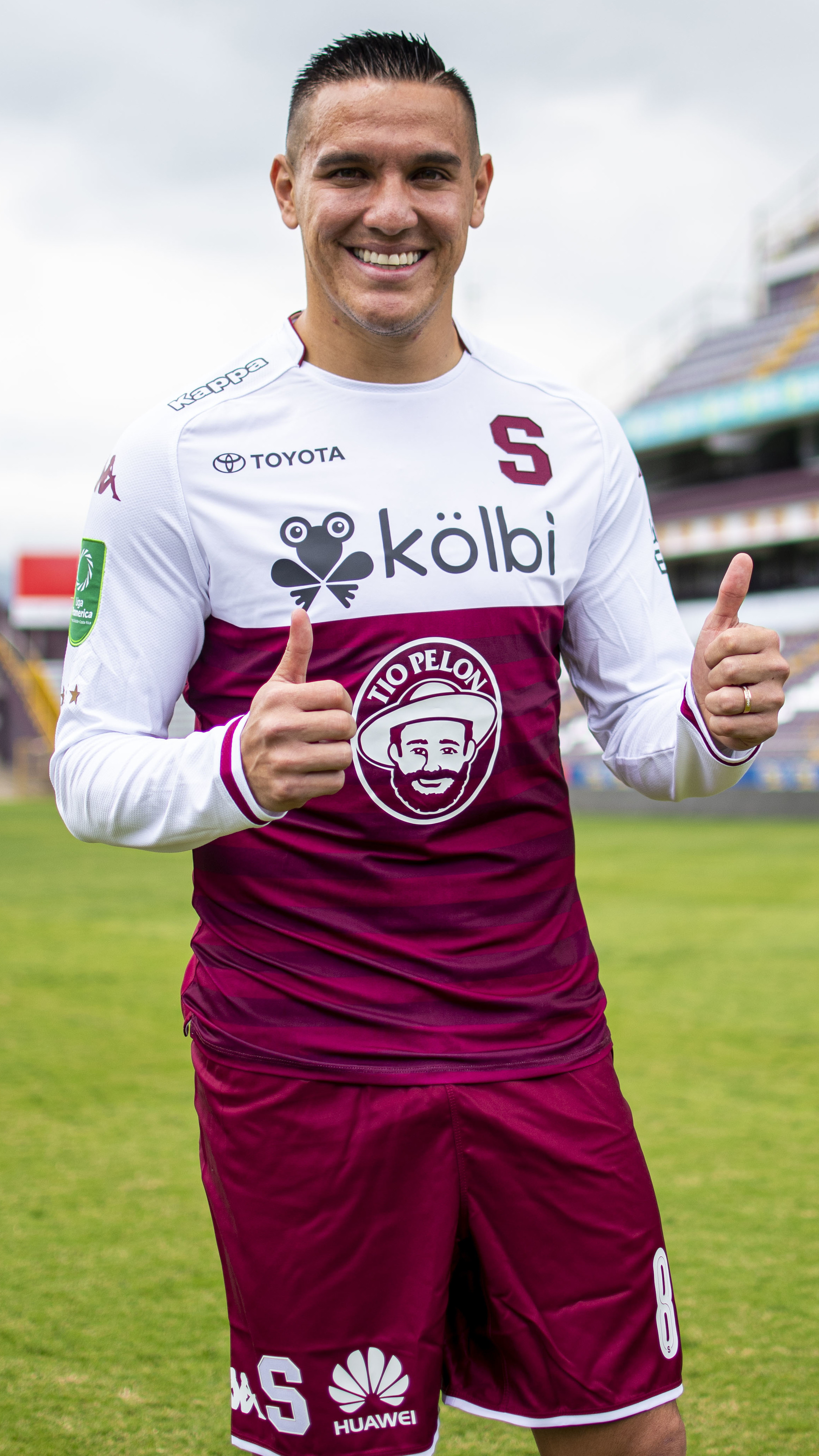
- Guzmán with Saprissa in 2020

Personal information
- Full name: David Alberto Guzmán Pérez
- Date of birth: 18 February 1990 (age 36)
- Place of birth: San José, Costa Rica
- Height: 1.76 m (5 ft 9 in)
- Position: Defensive midfielder

Team information
- Current team: Saprissa
- Number: 8

Youth career
- Cartaginés
- –2009: Saprissa

Senior career*
Years	Team	Apps	(Gls)
2009–2016	Saprissa	174	(14)
2017–2019	Portland Timbers	44	(4)
2018	→ Portland Timbers 2	1	(0)
2019	Columbus Crew SC	16	(0)
2019–	Saprissa	55	(4)

International career^{‡}
2007	Costa Rica U17	4	(0)
2009	Costa Rica U20	7	(1)
2010–	Costa Rica	60	(0)
- * Club domestic league appearances and goals as of 21 July 2021 ‡ National team caps and goals as of 26 July 2021

David Alberto Guzmán Pérez (born 18 February 1990) is a Costa Rican professional footballer who plays as a defensive midfielder for Liga FPD club Saprissa and the Costa Rica national team.

== Club career ==
Guzmán made his debut for Saprissa in 2009 and stayed with the club for 7 years. On 22 December 2016, he joined MLS team Portland Timbers.

On May 6, 2019, Guzman was traded to Columbus Crew SC in exchange for an international roster slot.

== International career ==
Guzmán played at the 2007 FIFA U-17 World Cup and in the 2009 FIFA U-20 World Cup, where the Costa Rica national under-20 football team, came 4th after losing to Hungary in the match for the 3rd place.

He made his senior debut for Costa Rica in an October 2010 friendly match against Peru. He represented his country at the 2011 Copa América and was a non-playing squad member at the 2011 CONCACAF Gold Cup.

In May 2018 he was named in Costa Rica's 23-man squad for the 2018 FIFA World Cup in Russia.

== Career statistics ==
=== Club ===
As of 29 September 2019

Club	Season	League			Cup (Note: All known appearances in the U.S. Open Cup)		Continental (Note: All appearances in the CONCACAF Champions League)		Other (Note: All appearances in the MLS Cup Playoffs)		Total	
Club	Season	Division	Apps	Goals	Apps	Goals	Apps	Goals	Apps	Goals	Apps	Goals
Saprissa	2009–10	Primera División	12	1	–		1	0	–		13	1
Saprissa	2010–11	Primera División	9	1	–		9	1	–		18	2
Saprissa	2011–12	Primera División	22	0	–		–		–		22	0
Saprissa	2012–13	Primera División	14	0	–		–		–		14	0
Saprissa	2013–14	Primera División	32	1			–		–		32+	1+
Saprissa	2014–15	Liga FPD	34	6			4	0	–		38+	6+
Saprissa	2015–16	Liga FPD	28	2			3	1	–		31+	3+
Saprissa	2016–17	Liga FPD	23	3	–		4	0	–		27	3
Saprissa	Total		174	14	0+	0+	21	2	0	0	195+	16+
Portland Timbers	2017	MLS	25	1	0	0	–		1	0	26	1
Portland Timbers	2018	MLS	14	3	1	0	–		5	0	20	3
Portland Timbers	2019	MLS	5	0	0	0	–		0	0	5	0
Portland Timbers	Total		44	4	1	0	0	0	6	0	51	4
Portland Timbers 2 (loan)	2018	USL	1	0	–		–		0	0	1	0
Columbus Crew SC	2019	MLS	16	0	2	0	–		–		18	0
Career total			235	18	3+	0+	21	2	6	0	265+	20+

=== International ===
As of 26 July 2021

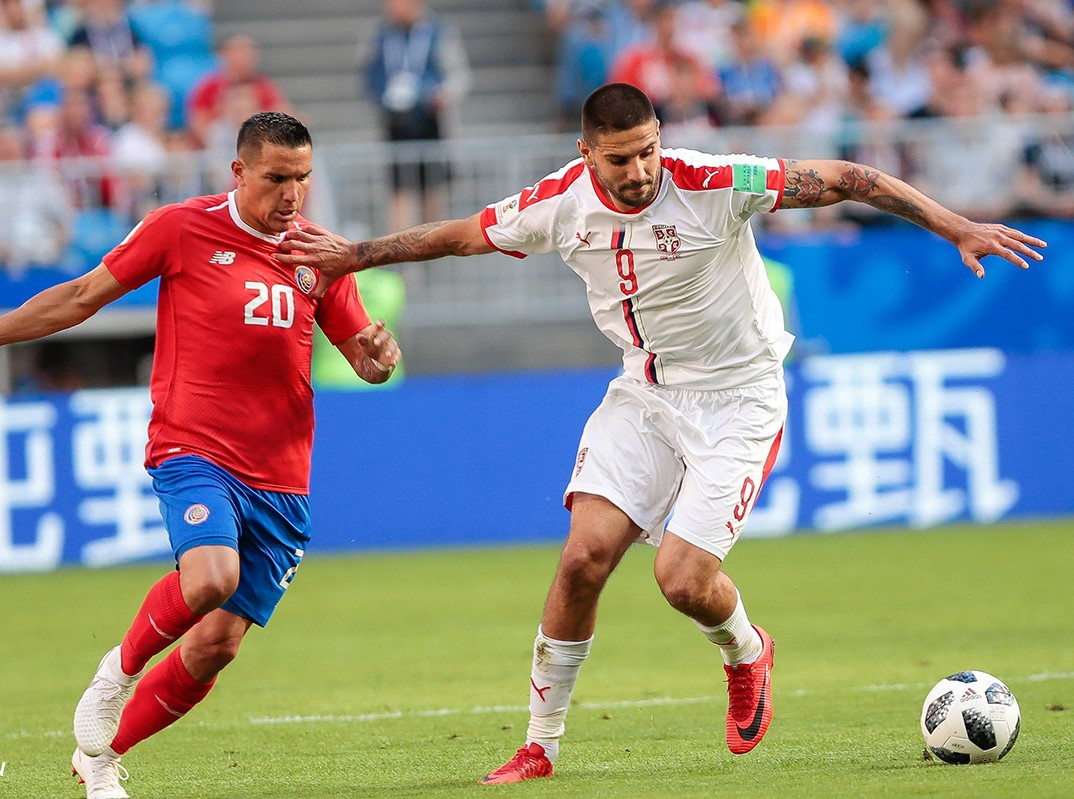
Guzmán (left) disputes the ball with Serbia's Aleksandar Mitrović at the 2018 FIFA World Cup

Costa Rica
Year	Apps	Goals
2010	5	0
2011	6	0
2015	11	0
2016	3	0
2017	17	0
2018	11	0
2019	1	0
2020	2	0
2021	4	0
Total	60	0

== Honours ==
Saprissa

- Liga FPD: Clausura 2010, Clausura 2014, Apertura 2014, Apertura 2015, Apertura 2016, Clausura 2020, Clausura 2021, Apertura 2022
- Costa Rican Cup: 2013
