= Claude Dielna =

French footballer (born 1987)

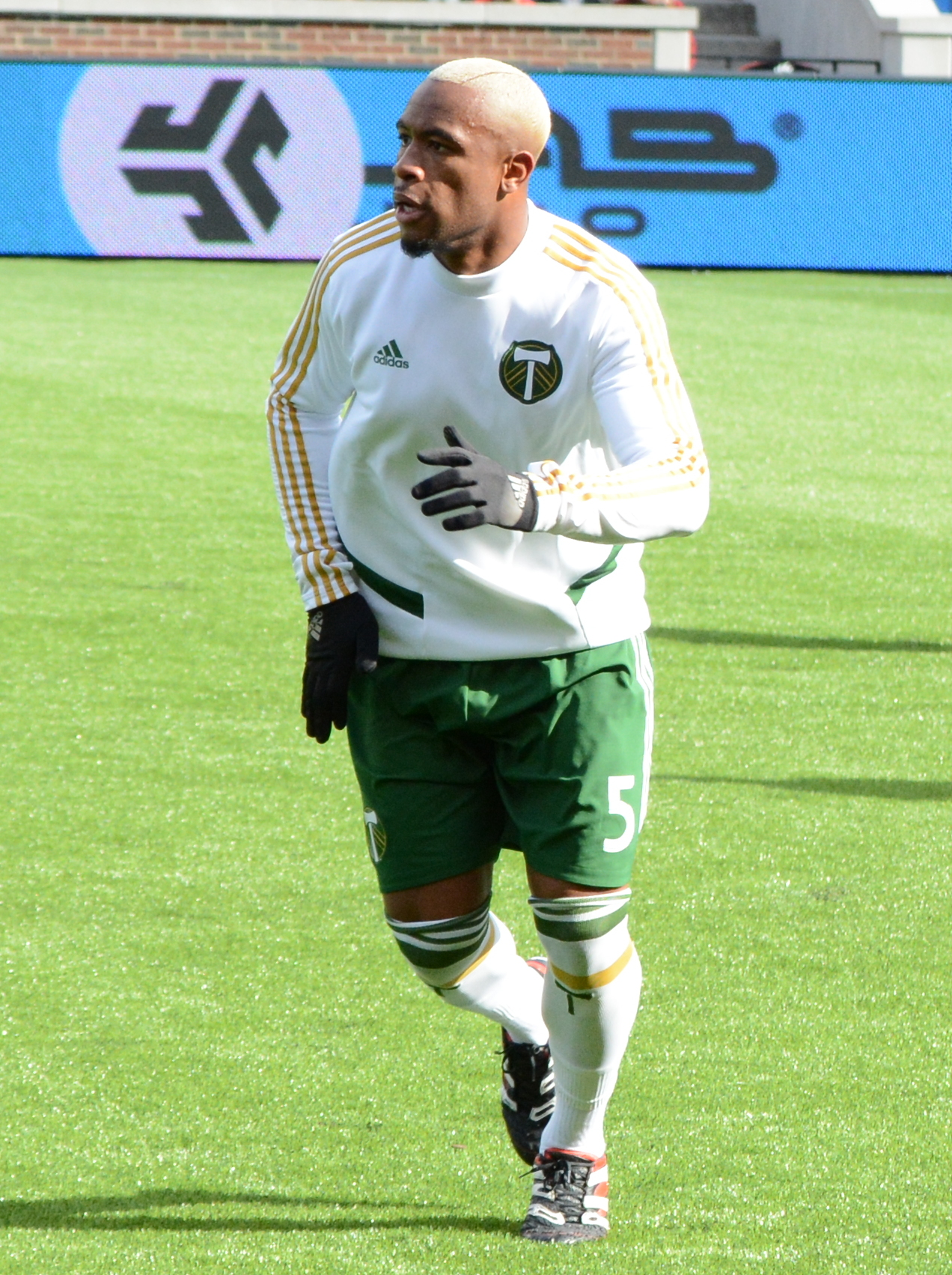
- Dielna with Portland Timbers in 2019

Personal information
- Full name: Claude Pierre Marie Dielna
- Date of birth: 14 December 1987 (age 38)
- Place of birth: Clichy-la-Garenne, France
- Height: 1.84 m (6 ft 0 in)
- Position: Centre-back

Youth career
- –2006: Caen

Senior career*
Years	Team	Apps	(Gls)
2006–2008	Lorient	0	(0)
2008–2012	Istres	95	(1)
2012–2014	Olympiacos	0	(0)
2012–2013	→ Sedan (loan)	25	(2)
2013–2014	→ Ajaccio (loan)	22	(0)
2014–2017	Sheffield Wednesday	23	(1)
2015–2016	→ Slovan Bratislava (loan)	4	(0)
2017	→ Dinamo București (loan)	10	(0)
2017–2018	New England Revolution	28	(0)
2019	Portland Timbers	15	(0)
2020	Universitatea Craiova	1	(0)
2021–2022	Ħamrun Spartans	17	(2)
- * Club domestic league appearances and goals as of 13:12, 5 December 2021 (UTC)

Claude Pierre Marie Dielna (born 14 December 1987) is a former French professional footballer who last played as a central centre-back for Ħamrun Spartans in Malta.

== Career ==
Born in Clichy-la-Garenne, Dielna started his career at Caen before moving to Lorient, where he signed his first professional contract in April 2007, which he described as his greatest sporting joy. However, at Lorient, Dielna struggled to make a breakthrough at Lorient and left the club for Istres, signing a one-year contract in the summer of 2008.

Dielna was a first team regular during his time at Istres, making a total of 95 appearances for the Ligue 2 team. He also helped the side win the French national titles during his time there.

=== Olympiacos ===
Dielna signed for Olympiacos in late May 2012 as a free agent on a three-year contract. However, Manager Leonardo Jardim placed Dielna on a loan list.

Immediately after joining Olympiacos, Dielna returned to France, where he joined Sedan on a season long loan. Dielna made his debut for the club, days later after joining the club, in a 2–2 draw against Caen. Dielna would go on to make twenty-five appearances and score two goals against Tours and Arles-Avignon for the club.

At the start of the 2013–14 season, Dielna loaned out again to join Ligue 1 side Ajaccio on a season long loan. Dielna went on to make 22 appearances for the club, though his spell was overshadowed by claims he fell out with manager Fabrizio Ravanelli. However, at the end of the season, Ajaccio were relegated to Ligue 2 and Dielna announced that he will be returning to Olympiacos. Dielna cited the club's relegation was over injury problems.

=== Sheffield Wednesday ===
On 30 August 2014, Dielna signed a three-year deal with English championship side Sheffield Wednesday. Dielna's move to the club was welcomed by Réda Johnson.

Dielna made his debut for the club, where he came on as a substitute for Jacques Maghoma in the last minute, in a 1–0 win over Reading. Then, on 6 December 2014, Dielna scored his first goal for the club after coming on as an 88th-minute substitute and scoring the winner in 93rd minute to win 2–1 over Blackburn Rovers. His good display in the match earned him included Football League Team of the Week for the Championship. Initially out of the first team since joining the club, due to his match fitness and sharpness, Dielna soon established himself in the first team despite facing competitions from Joe Mattock. His performance attracted interests from West Brom and Genoa. Despite this, he continued that run until an injury struck out for the rest of the season. In his first season at Sheffield Wednesday, Dielna made twenty-five appearances and scoring three times in all competitions.

In the 2015–16 season, Dielna, however, found himself out of the first team, due to his own injury concern and was dropped out by new Manager Carlos Carvalhal. With his future at the club uncertain, Dielna was told by the club that he can leave the club on loan. He was subsequently loaned out to Slovan Bratislava for the rest of the season. He made his Slovan Bratislava debut, where he came on as a second-half substitute, in a 1–0 win over Železiarne Podbrezová on 5 March 2016. Dielna went on to make six appearances for the club before returning to his parent club at the end of the season.

In the 2016–17 season, Dielna was placed on a transfer list by Manager Carvalhal upon returning to his parent club. Amid to being placed on the transfer list, Dielna was disciplined by the club for breaching the club's policy on social media and was subsequently suspended. He remained out of the first team throughout most of the season. After being told by the club that he can leave the club, Dielna joined Romanian side Dinamo București on loan for the rest of the season. He made his debut for club, starting the whole game, in a 2–1 loss against Concordia Chiajna on 13 February 2017. Although he suffered a muscle injury later in the season, Dielna managed to regain his first team since his return and made seventeen appearances for the side.

Upon returning to his parent club, Dielna was released by the club at the end of the 2016–17 season.

=== New England Revolution ===
After being released by Sheffield Wednesday, Dielna was linked a move to Dinamo București. Instead, Dielna signed with Major League Soccer side New England Revolution on 28 July 2017.

New England released Dielna at the end of their 2018 season.

== Personal life ==
Dielna is a cousin of Ronald Zubar and Stéphane Zubar, who are both professional footballers and also has a Guadeloupe descent. He's good friends with Bakary Sako.

== Career statistics ==
As of 21 July 2018

Appearances and goals by club, season and competition
Club	Season	League			National cup (Note: Includes the Coupe de France, FA Cup, and Cupa României)		League cup (Note: Includes the Coupe de la Ligue, League Cup, and Cupa Ligii)		Continental		Other		Total	
Club	Season	Division	Apps	Goals	Apps	Goals	Apps	Goals	Apps	Goals	Apps	Goals	Apps	Goals
Lorient	2006–07	Ligue 1	0	0	0	0	0	0	–		–		0	0
Lorient	2007–08	Ligue 1	0	0	0	0	0	0	–		–		0	0
Lorient	Total		0	0	0	0	0	0	0	0	0	0	0	0
Istres	2008–09	Championnat National	33	0	0	0	1	0	–		–		34	0
Istres	2009–10	Ligue 2	21	0	1	0	2	0	–		–		24	0
Istres	2010–11	Ligue 2	24	1	2	0	1	0	–		–		27	1
Istres	2011–12	Ligue 2	17	0	1	0	1	1	–		–		19	1
Istres	Total		95	1	4	0	5	1	0	0	0	0	104	2
Olympiacos	2012–13	Super League Greece	0	0	0	0	–		0	0	–		0	0
Olympiacos	2013–14	Super League Greece	0	0	0	0	–		0	0	–		0	0
Olympiacos	Total		0	0	0	0	0	0	0	0	0	0	0	0
Sedan (loan)	2012–13	Ligue 2	25	2	2	0	0	0	–		–		27	2
Sedan II (loan)	2012–13	Championnat National	1	0	–		–		–		–		1	0
Ajaccio (loan)	2013–14	Ligue 1	22	0	1	0	1	0	–		–		24	0
Ajaccio II (loan)	2013–14	Championnat National	1	0	–		–		–		–		1	0
Sheffield Wednesday	2014–15	Championship	23	1	1	0	1	0	–		–		25	1
Sheffield Wednesday	2015–16	Championship	0	0	0	0	0	0	–		–		0	0
Sheffield Wednesday	2016–17	Championship	0	0	0	0	0	0	–		–		0	0
Sheffield Wednesday	Total		23	1	1	0	1	0	0	0	0	0	25	1
Slovan Bratislava (loan)	2015–16	Slovak Super Liga	4	0	0	0	–		–		–		4	0
Slovan Bratislava B (loan)	2015–16	2. liga	2	0	–		–		–		–		2	0
Dinamo București (loan)	2016–17	Liga I	10	0	1	0	1	0	–		–		12	0
New England Revolution	2017	MLS	11	0	0	0	–		–		–		11	0
New England Revolution	2018	MLS	17	0	0	0	–		–		–		17	0
New England Revolution	Total		28	0	0	0	0	0	0	0	0	0	28	0
Portland Timbers	2019	MLS	0	0	0	0	–		–		0	0	0	0
Career total			211	4	9	0	8	1	0	0	0	0	228	5

== Coaching career ==
Dielna signed with Athletes Untapped as a private soccer coach on March 28, 2024.
