= Brian Fernández =

Argentine footballer

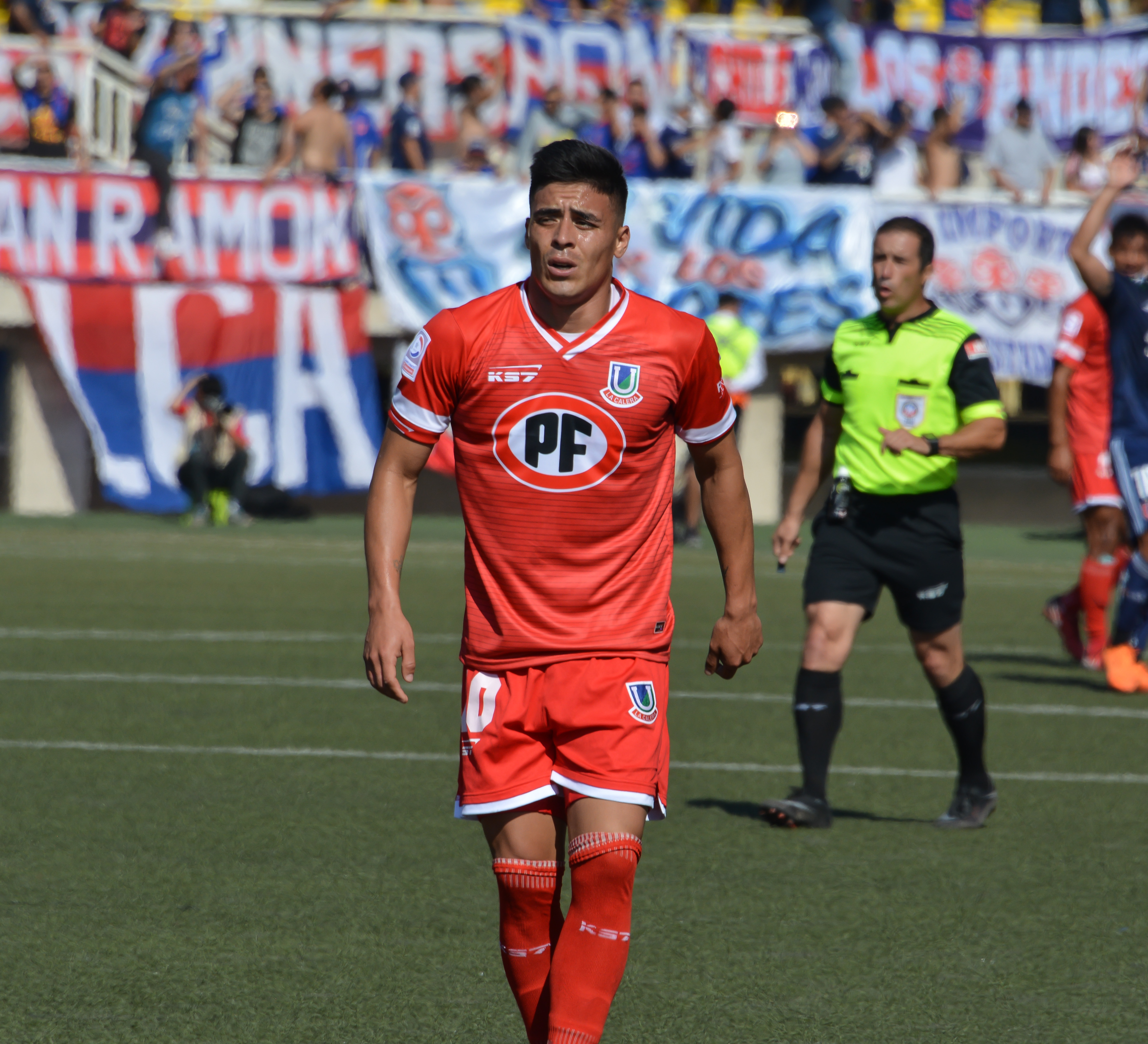
- Fernández with Unión La Calera in 2018

Personal information
- Full name: Brian Leonel Fernández
- Date of birth: 26 September 1994 (age 32)
- Place of birth: Santa Fe, Argentina
- Height: 1.75 m (5 ft 9 in)
- Position: Forward

Youth career
- Defensa y Justicia

Senior career*
Years	Team	Apps	(Gls)
2012–2014	Defensa y Justicia	67	(15)
2015–2018	Racing Club	15	(0)
2017	→ Sarmiento (loan)	5	(3)
2017	→ Metz (loan)	7	(0)
2017	→ Metz II (loan)	3	(3)
2018	→ Unión La Calera (loan)	12	(11)
2018–2019	Necaxa	30	(16)
2019	Portland Timbers	19	(11)
2020–2023	Colón	5	(1)
2021	→ Ferro Carril Oeste (loan)	23	(14)
2022	→ Deportivo Madryn (loan)	6	(1)
2022	→ Ferro Carril Oeste (loan)	7	(0)
2023	Morelia	2	(1)
2024	Almirante Brown	26	(5)
2025	Coquimbo Unido	0	(0)
2025	Talleres RdE	4	(1)
2026	Fénix	0	(0)
- * Club domestic league appearances and goals as of 17 March 2026

Brian Leonel Fernández (born 26 September 1994) is an Argentine professional footballer who plays as a forward.

== Club career ==
=== Defensa y Justicia ===
Fernández made his professional debut for Defensa y Justicia on 25 May 2012 in a 1–0 loss to Ferro Carril Oeste. He participated in three matches but did not score a goal. In the following season Fernández participated in 13 matches, still without scoring.

In the 2013–14 season he secured a position as a starter and scored 11 goals including the goal that secured promotion for his club to the Primera División, against San Martín de San Juan on 15 May 2014. On 8 August 2014 he scored his first goal in the Argentine top division in a 3–1 loss to Racing Club.

=== Racing Club ===
On 31 December 2014 Fernández was signed by Racing Club for a reported $1 million in exchange for 50% of his economic rights. His first goal for the club was in the Copa Libertadores group stage against Sporting Cristal on 10 March 2015. He scored three goals in the competition before his club was eliminated by Guaraní in the quarter-finals. Fernández scored both goals in a 2–0 victory for Racing in his debut in the 2014–15 Copa Argentina against Independiente de Neuquén.

After the 12th round of the 2015 Argentine Primera División Fernández tested positive for prohibited controlled substances and was subsequently prohibited from playing professional football until 9 January 2017. Fernández played the entire 2016 season for Racing Club's reserve team in the reserve league.

After a slow return to Racing's professional squad in 2017, manager Diego Cocca had Fernández loaned out to Primera División side Sarmiento in May. For the club, he scored three goals in his first three matches. He played five of six remaining league matches for Sarmiento, who were relegated at the end of the season.

Fernández was recalled to Racing Club after his loan. He scored against Independiente Medellín in the second round of the 2017 Copa Sudamericana on 27 June 2017.

=== FC Metz ===
On 23 August 2017, Fernández joined Ligue 1 side FC Metz on a one-year loan deal. Metz secured an option to sign him permanently. He made seven substitute appearances for the senior squad without scoring before being moved the reserve squad in the Championnat National 3 (fifth division) for the remainder of the 2017 calendar year. In January 2018 his loan deal was terminated.

=== Unión La Calera ===
On 4 January 2018, Fernández was loaned from Racing Club to newly promoted Chilean Primera División club Unión La Calera with an option to buy. The 23 year-old scored 11 goals in 12 league matches for Unión La Calera, helping to deliver one of the best seasons in the club's history. His final match for the club was on 29 May against Colo-Colo, in which he scored in the 2–0 victory. Unión La Calera were 3rd place in the league at the time of Fernández's departure to Mexico.

=== Necaxa ===
On 7 June 2018, Liga MX club Necaxa confirmed the signing of Fernández on a three-year contract from Racing for a reported $3 million. Fernández scored in his Necaxa debut in a 2–1 victory against Club América in the first round of the 2018–19 Apertura season. He scored four goals in 15 Torneo Apertura appearances, and twelve goals in 15 Torneo Clausura appearances, as well as two goals in two Copa MX appearances, both scored as a substitute in a 3–2 loss to Atlético San Luis. Necaxa qualified for the Clausura Liguilla playoffs, but Fernández did not participate because a transfer agreement for him had been reached.

=== Portland Timbers ===
On 6 May 2019, it was announced that Fernández had signed for Major League Soccer side Portland Timbers as a Designated Player for an undisclosed fee reported to be between $10 and $12 million, a Portland Timbers record. Fernández netted one goal in his debut against the Houston Dynamo on 16 May, and scored eight goals in his first six matches for the Timbers.

On 7 October 2019, it was announced that Fernández has voluntarily entered MLS' Substance Abuse and Behavioral Health Program. On 15 November 2019, Major League Soccer announced they had terminated his contract.

=== Colón ===
Following his dismissal by Portland, Fernández moved back to his native Argentina, joining Argentine Primera División side Colón on 10 January 2020.

Shortly after signing with Colón, Fernández reportedly disappeared and failed to arrive for training for three days. His disappearance was reported to the police, who issued an order for whereabouts, and he was later found alive and well at home. Various reasons for his absence were given, including "a flu" and later of a "personal problem".

On 4 February, Fernández was again to miss training amid reports of a robbery where "...they pointed a gun at my [his] head". They also allegedly stole his Rolex watch and threw a brick through his window. He was also reportedly threatened by his own father, due to his father supporting Colón's local rivals Unión de Santa Fe.

==== Loan spells ====
Fernández joined Ferro Carril Oeste in late February 2021 on a loan deal for the rest of the year.

In February 2022, he was sent out on loan to Deportivo Madryn until the end of 2022. However, the spell at Deportivo Madryn was cut short and he instead returned to Ferro Carril Oeste on a loan deal until the end of the year. On September 8, 2022, Ferro announced that Fernandez had not shown up for training for two consecutive days and that he "would not be returning again."

=== Coquimbo Unido ===
Fernández returned to Chile after his stint with Unión La Calera for the 2025 season and joined Coquimbo Unido on 10 December 2024. On 23 December, he returned to Argentina and announced his resignation from the club after being away from the training sessions.

=== Talleres RdE ===
Fernández signed with Talleres de Remedios de Escalada on 6 May 2025.

=== Fénix ===
In January 2026, Fernández moved to Uruguay and signed with Fénix in the second level. On 17 March 2026, the club ended his contract.

== Personal life ==
Fernández has four footballing brothers: Leandro Fernández, Nicolás Fernández, Juan Cruz Villagra and Tomás Villagra; the latter two took their mother's surname.

== Doping case ==
Fernández tested positive for cocaine at two in-competition controls in May 2015, and was subsequently handed a three-month ban from sports by AFA, with the ban ending 3 September 2015. The South American Football Confederation (CONMEBOL) did however seek a two-year ban for him, and he was still suspended in late September 2015. On 28 October it was announced that he had been banned for two years. The substance he had tested positive for was cocaine.

Due to all of those positive drug results, he was moved to Racing Club's reserve team in 2016.

== Career statistics ==
=== Club ===
As of 1 July 2019

Club	Season	League			Domestic Cup		League Cup (Note: Includes: MLS Cup Playoffs)		Continental		Total	
Club	Season	League	Apps	Goals	Apps	Goals	Apps	Goals	Apps	Goals	Apps	Goals
Defensa y Justicia	2011–12	Nacional B	3	0	—		—		—		3	0
Defensa y Justicia	2012–13	Nacional B	13	0	—		—		—		13	0
Defensa y Justicia	2013–14	Nacional B	38	11	3	1	—		—		41	12
Defensa y Justicia	2014	Superliga	13	4	—		—		—		13	4
Defensa y Justicia	Total		67	15	3	1	0	0	0	0	70	16
Racing Club	2015	Superliga	12	0	1	2	—		8 (Note: Appearances in Copa Libertadores)	3	21	5
Racing Club	2016	Superliga	—		—		—		—		0	0
Racing Club	2016–17	Superliga	3	0	3	1	—		1 (Note: Appearance(s) in Copa Sudamericana)	0	7	1
Racing Club	2017–18	Superliga	0	0	—		—		1	1	1	1
Racing Club	Total		15	0	4	3	0	0	10	4	29	7
Sarmiento (loan)	2016–17	Superliga	5	3	1	0	—		—		6	3
Metz (loan)	2017–18	Ligue 1	7	0	0	0	—		—		7	0
Metz II (loan)	2017–18	National 3	3	3	—		—		—		3	3
Unión La Calera (loan)	2018	Primera División	12	11	—		—		—		12	11
Necaxa	2018–19	Liga MX	30	16	2	2	—		—		32	18
Portland Timbers	2019	MLS	5	6	2	3	—	—	—		7	9
Career totals			144	54	12	9	0	0	10	4	166	67
