= Jorge Moreira =

Paraguayan footballer (born 1990)

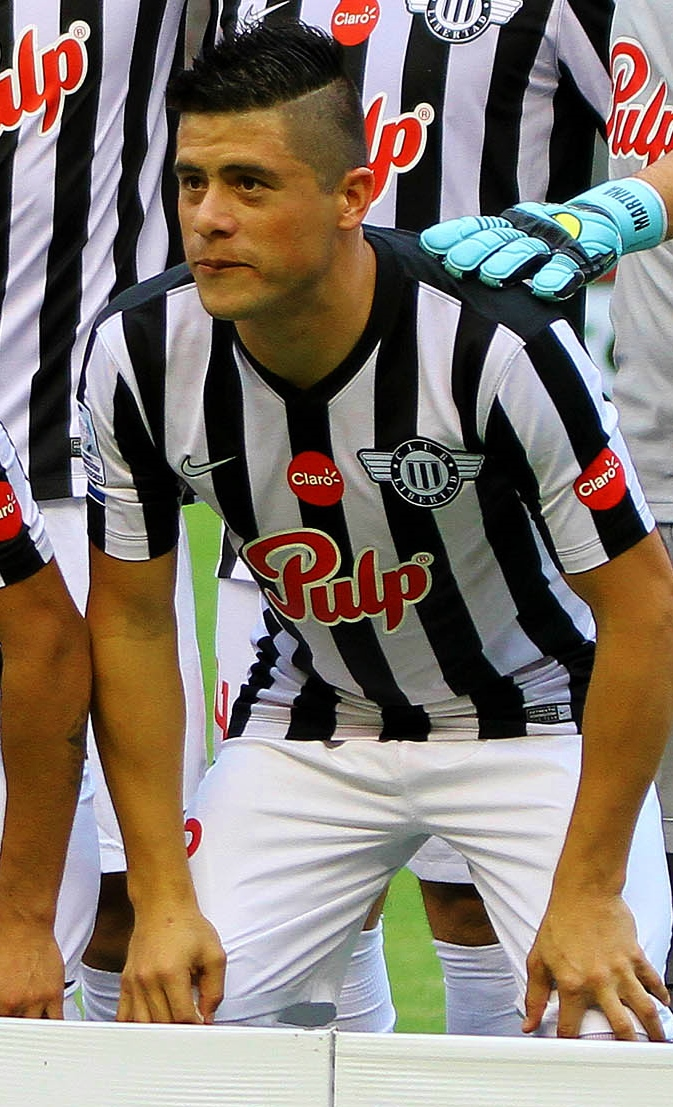
- Moreira with Libertad in 2015

Personal information
- Full name: Jorge Luis Moreira Ferreira
- Date of birth: 1 February 1990 (age 36)
- Place of birth: Villarrica, Paraguay
- Height: 1.72 m (5 ft 8 in)
- Position: Right-back

Youth career
- 2005–2009: 2 de Mayo

Senior career*
Years	Team	Apps	(Gls)
2009	2 de Mayo	16	(2)
2010–2016	Libertad	176	(6)
2016–2021	River Plate	39	(1)
2019–2020	→ Portland Timbers (loan)	27	(2)
2022	12 de Octubre	4	(0)
2023	Fernando de la Mora	1	(0)
2023	Resistencia	18	(1)

International career
2006	Paraguay U17	8	(1)
2009–2010	Paraguay U20	13	(1)
2010–2019	Paraguay	19	(0)
- * Club domestic league appearances and goals as of 19:12, 10 December 2023 (UTC)

Jorge Luis Moreira Ferreira (born 1 February 1990) is a Paraguayan footballer who plays as a right-back.

== Club career ==
=== 2 de Mayo ===
Born in Villarrica, Moreira started his career with 2 de Mayo, as a midfielder. Promoted to the first team in June 2009, he made his first team – and Primera División – debut on 20 June, coming on as a late substitute for Domingo Martínez in a 2–1 away loss against Nacional.

Moreira scored his first professional goal on 14 August 2009, netting the fourth in a 5–0 home routing of Tacuary. He finished his first senior season with two goals in 16 appearances.

=== Libertad ===
In December 2009, Moreira moved to Libertad ahead of the ensuing campaign. In 2011, after the injury of Carlos Bonet, he was converted into a right back by manager Gregorio Pérez, and started to feature regularly in that position onwards.

Whilst at the club, Moreira won five league titles and scored six goals.

=== River Plate ===
On 21 July 2016, Moreira moved abroad for the first time in his career, joining Argentine Primera División side River Plate after agreeing to a four-year contract. He made his debut abroad ten days later, starting in a 3–0 Copa Argentina home defeat of CS Rivadavia Venado Tuerto.

Moreira made his top tier debut on 28 August 2016, playing the full 90 minutes in a 4–1 home routing of Banfield. He scored his first goal for the club the following 27 April, netting the equalizer in a 2–1 win at Emelec, for the year's Copa Libertadores.

In October 2017, Moreira suffered an injury which took him out of the 2017 Copa Libertadores semifinals. He then subsequently underwent surgery in his right knee, being estimated to return under three months; however, setbacks meant that he only could return in August 2018, nearly ten months from his last appearance.

=== Portland Timbers ===
On 20 February 2019, Moreira was acquired by Portland Timbers on loan from Club Atlético River Plate of Argentina. On 18 June 2020, Portland announced that Moreira would return to River Plate after the two club's were unable to agree on a transfer fee to make the move permanent.

== International career ==
Moreira represented Paraguay at under-17 and under-20 levels. On 25 March 2010, he was first called up for the full side by manager Gerardo Martino for a friendly against South Africa.

Moreira made his full international debut on 31 March 2010, replacing Jonathan Santana in the 1–1 draw at the Estadio Defensores del Chaco in Asunción.

== Career statistics ==
=== Club ===
As of 13 January 2019

Club	Season	League			Cup		Continental		Other		Total	
Club	Season	Division	Apps	Goals	Apps	Goals	Apps	Goals	Apps	Goals	Apps	Goals
2 de Mayo	2009	Primera División	16	2	—		—		—		16	2
Libertad	2010	Primera División	22	2	—		7 (Note: Appearance(s) in Copa Libertadores)	0	—		29	2
Libertad	2011	Primera División	17	0	—		1	0	—		18	0
Libertad	2012	Primera División	21	1	—		0	0	—		21	1
Libertad	2013	Primera División	29	1	—		16 (Note: Six appearances in Copa Libertadores, ten appearances in Copa Sudamericana)	0	—		45	1
Libertad	2014	Primera División	33	1	—		6 (Note: Appearance(s) in Copa Sudamericana)	0	—		39	1
Libertad	2015	Primera División	31	0	—		11 (Note: Five appearances in Copa Libertadores, six appearances in Copa Sudamericana)	0	—		42	0
Libertad	2016	Primera División	23	1	—		—		—		23	1
Libertad	Total		176	6	—		41	0	—		217	6
River Plate	2016–17	Primera División	25	1	6	0	4	1	3 (Note: Two appearances in Recopa Sudamericana, one appearance in Supercopa Argentina)	0	38	2
River Plate	2017–18	Primera División	4	0	2	0	3	0	—		9	0
River Plate	2018–19	Primera División	7	0	0	0	0	0	1 (Note: Appearance(s) in FIFA Club World Cup)	0	8	0
River Plate	Total		36	1	8	0	7	1	4	0	55	2
Career total			228	9	8	0	48	1	4	0	288	10

=== International ===
As of match played 10 October 2017.

Paraguay
Year	Apps	Goals
2010	1	0
2014	4	0
2015	2	0
2016	5	0
2017	5	0
Total	17	0

== Honours ==
Libertad

- Paraguayan Primera División: 2010 Clausura, 2012 Clausura, 2014 Apertura, 2014 Clausura, 2016 Apertura

River Plate

- Recopa Sudamericana: 2016
- Copa Argentina: 2015–16, 2016–17
- Supercopa Argentina: 2017
- Copa Libertadores: 2018
