= MLS Next All-Star Game =

Soccer competition in North America

MLS Homegrown Game
- Founded: 2014
- Region: Major League Soccer (CONCACAF)
- Teams: 2

The MLS Next All-Star Game, formerly known as the MLS Homegrown Game, is an exhibition match between selected players in MLS Next Pro. Similar to events such as Major League Baseball's All-Star Futures Game, the National Hockey League's NHL All-Star Skills Competition and the National Basketball Association's Rising Stars Challenge, the event serves as a supporting event to the league's all-star game.

The inaugural game, held on August 4, 2014 against the Portland Timbers U23s at Providence Park, ended in a scoreless draw. The competition was held every season until 2020 when it was disrupted due to the COVID-19 pandemic. The competition resumed under its current name and format.

== Results ==
=== MLS Homegrown Game (2014–2021) ===
Year	Date	Score	Opponent	Venue	Host Club	Most Valuable Player
2014	August 5	0–0	(United States) Portland Timbers U23s	Providence Park	Portland Timbers	Jon Kempin, GK, Sporting Kansas City
2015	July 28	1–1 (4–5)	(Mexico) Club América U-20s	Dick's Sporting Goods Park	Colorado Rapids	León Quiñones, GK, Club América
2016	July 27	0–2	Mexico U-20s	Avaya Stadium	San Jose Earthquakes	Luis Marquez, MF, Guadalajara
2017	August 1	2–2	(Mexico) Guadalajara U-20s	Toyota Park	Chicago Fire	Kortne Ford, DF, Colorado Rapids
2018	July 31	1–1	(Mexico) Tigres U-20s	Atlanta United FC training facility	Atlanta United FC	Andrew Carleton, MF, Atlanta United FC
2019	July 30	2–2 (3–0)	(Mexico) Chivas U-20s	ESPN Wide World of Sports Complex	Orlando City SC	Noble Okello, MF, Toronto FC
2020	On hiatus due to COVID-19 pandemic in the United States.					

=== MLS Next All-Star Game (2022–present) ===
Year	Date	Home	Score	Away	Venue	Host Club	Most Valuable Player
2022	August 10	(United States) (Canada) MLS Next West	1–2	(United States) (Canada) MLS Next East	National Sports Center	Minnesota United FC	Favian Loyola, MF, Orlando City B
2023	July 19	(United States) (Canada) MLS Next West	2–2 (5–4p)	(United States) (Canada) MLS Next East	Glenn Warner Soccer Facility	D.C. United	Mo Shour, GK, Tacoma Defiance
2024	July 23	(United States) (Canada) MLS Next West	2–4	(United States) (Canada) MLS Next East	Historic Crew Stadium	Columbus Crew	Cavan Sullivan, MF, Philadelphia Union
2025	July 21	(United States) (Canada) MLS Next West	3–4	(United States) (Canada) MLS Next East	Parmer Field	Austin FC	Prince Forfor, DF, Columbus Crew 2

== Yearly rosters ==
=== 2014 ===
Pos.	Player	Club	Age
GK	(United States) Jon Kempin	Sporting Kansas City	21
GK	(United States) Matt Lampson	Columbus Crew	24
DF	(United States) Connor Lade	New York Red Bulls	24
DF	(Canada) Ashtone Morgan	Toronto FC	22
DF	(United States) Shane O'Neill	Colorado Rapids	21
DF	(United States) Erik Palmer-Brown	Sporting Kansas City	17
DF	(Mexico) Carlos Salcedo	Real Salt Lake	20
MF	(United States) Steven Evans	Portland Timbers	22
MF	(United States) Danny Garcia	FC Dallas	20
MF	(United States) Zach Pfeffer	Philadelphia Union	19
MF	(United States) Chris Ritter	Chicago Fire	23
MF	(United States) Dillon Serna	Colorado Rapids	20
MF	(United States) Harry Shipp	Chicago Fire	22
MF	(Canada) Russell Teibert	Vancouver Whitecaps FC	21
MF	(United States) Wil Trapp	Columbus Crew	21
FW	(United States) Caleb Calvert	Chivas USA	17
FW	(United States) Bradford Jamieson IV	LA Galaxy	17
FW	(United States) Sean Okoli	Seattle Sounders FC	21
FW	(United States) Tommy Thompson	San Jose Earthquakes	18
FW	(United States) Gyasi Zardes	LA Galaxy	22

=== 2015 ===
Pos.	Player	Club	Age
GK	(Mexico) Jesse González	FC Dallas	21
GK	(United States) Matt Lampson	Columbus Crew	25
DF	(United States) Justen Glad	Real Salt Lake	18
DF	(United States) Shane O'Neill	Colorado Rapids	22
DF	(United States) Erik Palmer-Brown	Sporting Kansas City	18
DF	(United States) Jalen Robinson	D.C. United	21
DF	(United States) Oscar Sorto	LA Galaxy	21
DF	(United States) Tyler Turner	Orlando City SC	19
MF	(Canada) Jay Chapman	Toronto FC	21
MF	(United States) Sean Davis	New York Red Bulls	22
MF	(United States) Zach Pfeffer	Philadelphia Union	20
MF	(United States) Memo Rodríguez	Houston Dynamo	19
MF	(United States) Dillon Serna	Colorado Rapids	21
MF	(United States) Harry Shipp	Chicago Fire	23
MF	(United States) Ben Swanson	Columbus Crew	18
MF	(Canada) Russell Teibert	Vancouver Whitecaps FC	21
MF	(United States) Alex Zendejas	FC Dallas	17
FW	(United States) Coy Craft	FC Dallas	18
FW	(Canada) Kianz Froese	Vancouver Whitecaps FC	19
FW	(Canada) Anthony Jackson-Hamel	Montreal Impact	21
FW	(United States) Bradford Jamieson IV	LA Galaxy	18
FW	(United States) Tommy Thompson	San Jose Earthquakes	19

=== 2016 ===
Pos.	Player	Club	Age
GK	(Canada) Maxime Crépeau	Montreal Impact	22
GK	(Mexico) (United States) Jesse González	FC Dallas	21
DF	(United States) Danilo Acosta	Real Salt Lake	18
DF	(United States) Justen Glad	Real Salt Lake	19
DF	(Mexico) Aaron Guillen	FC Dallas	23
DF	(Rwanda) Phanuel Kavita	Real Salt Lake	23
DF	(United States) Jalen Robinson	D.C. United	22
DF	(United States) Tyler Turner	Orlando City SC	20
MF	(United States) Tyler Adams	New York Red Bulls	17
MF	(United States) Jordan Allen	Real Salt Lake	21
MF	(Canada) Jay Chapman	Toronto FC	22
MF	(United States) Coy Craft	FC Dallas	19
MF	(England) Harrison Heath†	Orlando City SC	20
MF	(Haiti) Zachary Herivaux†	New England Revolution	20
MF	(United States) Aaron Kovar	Seattle Sounders FC	22
MF	(Mexico) Raúl Mendiola	LA Galaxy	22
MF	(United States) Tommy Thompson	San Jose Earthquakes	20
FW	(United States) Joey Calistri	Chicago Fire	22
FW	(Canada) Jordan Hamilton	Toronto FC	20
FW	(United States) Jack McBean	LA Galaxy	21
FW	(United States) Jordan Morris	Seattle Sounders FC	21

† – Herivaux was named as an injury replacement for Heath.

=== 2017 ===
Pos.	Player	Club	Age
GK	(United States) Jesse González	FC Dallas	22
GK	(United States) Evan Louro	New York Red Bulls	21
DF	(United States) Marco Farfan†	Portland Timbers	18
DF	(United States) Kortne Ford	Colorado Rapids	19
DF	(United States) Justen Glad	Real Salt Lake	20
DF	(United States) Erik Palmer-Brown†	Sporting Kansas City	20
DF	(United States) Auston Trusty	Philadelphia Union	18
MF	(United States) Tyler Adams	New York Red Bulls	18
MF	(Canada) Alphonso Davies†	Vancouver Whitecaps FC	16
MF	(Haiti) Derrick Etienne	New York Red Bulls	20
MF	(United States) Chris Goslin†	Atlanta United FC	17
MF	(Mexico) José Hernández†	Real Salt Lake	21
MF	(United States) Derrick Jones	Philadelphia Union	20
MF	(United States) Brooks Lennon	Real Salt Lake	19
MF	(United States) Djordje Mihailovic	Chicago Fire	18
MF	(United States) Paxton Pomykal	FC Dallas	17
MF	(Canada) Ballou Tabla†	Montreal Impact	18
FW	(United States) Andrew Carleton	Atlanta United FC	17
FW	(Colombia) Jesús Ferreira	FC Dallas	16
FW	(Canada) Jordan Hamilton	Toronto FC	21
FW	(United States) Bradford Jamieson IV	LA Galaxy	20

† – Goslin, Hernández, and Palmer-Brown were named as injury replacements for Davies, Farfan, and Tabla.

=== 2018 ===
Pos.	Player	Club	Age
GK	(United States) JT Marcinkowski	San Jose Earthquakes	21
GK	(Canada) Sean Melvin	Vancouver Whitecaps FC	24
DF	(United States) Marco Farfan	Portland Timbers	19
DF	(United States) Auston Trusty	Philadelphia Union	19
DF	(United States) James Sands	New York City FC	18
DF	(United States) Jaylin Lindsey	Sporting Kansas City	18
DF	(United States) Aaron Herrera	Real Salt Lake	21
DF	(United States) Mark McKenzie	Philadelphia Union	19
DF	(United States) Matthew Real	Philadelphia Union	18
MF	(United States) Andrew Carleton	Atlanta United FC	18
MF	(United States) Anthony Fontana	Philadelphia Union	18
MF	(United States) Cameron Lindley	Orlando City SC	21
MF	(Canada) Liam Fraser	Toronto FC	20
MF	(United States) Sebastian Saucedo	Real Salt Lake	21
MF	(United States) Ben Mines	New York Red Bulls	18
MF	(Mexico) Efraín Álvarez	LA Galaxy	16
MF	(United States) Lagos Kunga	Atlanta United FC	19
MF	(United States) Paxton Pomykal	FC Dallas	17
MF	(Malaysia) Wan Kuzain	Sporting Kansas City	19
FW	(Colombia) Jesús Ferreira	FC Dallas	17

=== 2019 ===
Pos.	Player	Club	Age
GK	(United States) David Ochoa	Real Salt Lake	18
GK	(United States) JT Marcinkowski	San Jose Earthquakes	22
GK	(United States) Mason Stajduhar	Orlando City SC	21
DF	(Canada) Clément Bayiha	Montreal Impact	20
DF	(United States) Sam Vines	Colorado Rapids	20
DF	(Sweden) Erik McCue	Houston Dynamo	18
DF	(United States) Aboubacar Keita	Columbus Crew SC	19
DF	(United States) Andre Reynolds	Chicago Fire	18
DF	(United States) George Campbell	Atlanta United FC	18
DF	(United States) Bryan Reynolds	FC Dallas	18
MF	(United States) Edwin Cerrillo	FC Dallas	18
MF	(United States) Gianluca Busio	Sporting Kansas City	17
MF	(United States) Brandon Servania	FC Dallas	20
MF	(United States) Brenden Aaronson	Philadelphia Union	18
MF	(United States) Cole Bassett	Colorado Rapids	18
MF	(Canada) Noble Okello	Toronto FC	19
MF	(Canada) Mathieu Choinière	Montreal Impact	20
MF	(United States) Thomas Roberts	FC Dallas	18
MF	(Mexico) Efraín Álvarez	LA Galaxy	17
FW	(United States) Justin Rennicks	New England Revolution	20
FW	(Canada) Theo Bair	Vancouver Whitecaps FC	19
FW	(United States) Benji Michel	Orlando City SC	21
FW	(Kenya) Handwalla Bwana	Seattle Sounders FC	22
FW	(United States) Omir Fernandez	New York Red Bulls	20

=== 2022 ===
MLS Next East Note: Flags indicate national team as defined under FIFA eligibility rules; some limited exceptions apply. Players may hold more than one non-FIFA nationality.

No.	Pos.	Nation	Player
1	GK	BLR	Stanislav Lapkes (Columbus Crew)
2	FW	USA	Nacho Alem (D.C. United)
3	FW	USA	Esmir Bajraktarević (New England Revolution)
4	DF	DOM	Israel Boatwright (Inter Miami CF)
5	DF	CAN	Thomas Bouffard (CF Montréal)
6	MF	USA	Brian Romero (Charlotte FC)
7	DF	USA	Noah Cobb (Atlanta United FC)
8	MF	USA	Benjamin Cremaschi (Inter Miami)
9	MF	USA	Giorgio DeLibera (Columbus Crew)
10	FW	POR	Bento Estrela (New York Red Bulls)
11	DF	ESA	David García (FC Cincinnati)

No.	Pos.	Nation	Player
12	MF	ESP	Alejandro Granados (Orlando City SC)
13	DF	USA	Malachi Grant (Atlanta United)
14	FW	USA	Colin Griffith (PDA (Note: Players' Development Academy; committed to University of Maryland, College Park ahead of the 2022 NCAA Division I men's soccer season.))
15	DF	USA	Daniel Krueger (Philadelphia Union)
16	FW	USA	Favian Loyola (Orlando City)
17	MF	USA	Jack Panayotou (New England Revolution)
18	GK	USA	Andrew Rick (Philadelphia Union)
19	DF	RSA	Adam Pearlman (Toronto FC)
20	DF	PUR	Diego Rossi (New York City FC (Note: Committed to University of Virginia ahead of the 2022 NCAA Division I men's soccer season.))
21	MF	JAM	Kobi Thomas (Inter Miami)
22	FW	ECU	Marcos Zambrano (Philadelphia Union)

MLS Next West Note: Flags indicate national team as defined under FIFA eligibility rules; some limited exceptions apply. Players may hold more than one non-FIFA nationality.

No.	Pos.	Nation	Player
1			Adam Beaudry (Colorado Rapids)
2			Alejandro Alcala (LA Galaxy)
3			Christopher Aquino (Seattle Sounders FC)
4			Edgar Bazan (Sporting Kansas City)
5			Alejandro Carrillo (Nashville SC)
6			Keith Chavarria (Colorado Rapids)
7			Mihail Gherasimencov (Vancouver Whitecaps FC)
8			Andre Gitau (Houston Dynamo)
9			Anthony Gonzalez (Austin FC)
10			Stuart Hawkins (Seattle Sounders)
11			Gershon Henry (Real Salt Lake)

No.	Pos.	Nation	Player
12			Bryce Jamison (Barça Residence Academy)
13			Marcus Lee (California United Strikers)
14			Carlos Leatherman (Minnesota United FC)
15			Cruz Medina (San Jose Earthquakes)
16			Malachi Molina (FC Dallas)
17			Bryan Moyado (Los Angeles FC)
18			Emmanuel Ochoa (San Jose Earthquakes)
19			Drew Murray (San Jose Earthquakes)
20			Kevin Rodriguez (San Francisco Glens)
21			Ian Shaul (Portland Timbers)
22			Roka Tsunehara (De Anza Force)
23			Fritz Volmar (St. Louis City SC)
