= 2018 Columbus Crew SC season =

Columbus Crew SC
2018 season
- Investor-operators: Anthony Precourt
- Head Coach: Gregg Berhalter
- Stadium: MAPFRE Stadium
- Major League Soccer: Conference: 5th Overall: 10th
- MLS Cup playoffs: Conference semifinals
- U.S. Open Cup: Fourth round
- Top goalscorer: League: Gyasi Zardes (19); All: Gyasi Zardes (20)
- Highest home attendance: 19,121 (9/22 v. COL)
- Lowest home attendance: 4,992 (6/6 v. CHI)
- Average home league attendance: 12,472 (62.5%)
- Biggest win: CLB 3–0 CHI (5/12)
- Biggest defeat: LAG 4–0 CLB (7/7)
Home colors	Away colors

The 2018 Columbus Crew SC season was the club's 23rd season of existence and their 23rd consecutive season in Major League Soccer, the top flight of soccer in the United States and Canada. The first match of the season was on March 3 against Toronto FC. It was the fifth season under head coach Gregg Berhalter.

== Background ==
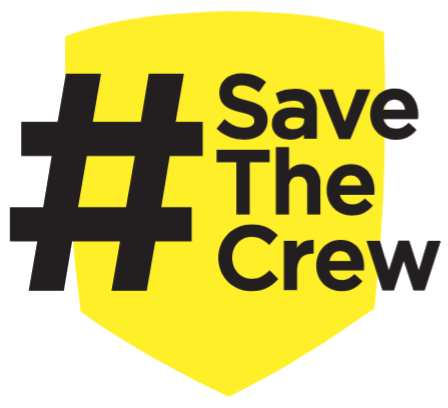
The original logo of the Save the Crew movement

Overshadowing the season for Columbus was a threat by owner Anthony Precourt to move the team to Austin, Texas; Precourt had announced the proposed move in October 2017, five days before the team's final regular season game. The #SavetheCrew movement had been created in the aftermath of this proposed move.

Two days after the 2018 regular season began, Ohio Attorney General Mike DeWine and the City of Columbus filed a lawsuit against Precourt, citing a 1996 state law that prevents sports teams that benefited from public facilities or financial assistance from relocating to another city without a six-month notice and attempting to sell the team to a local ownership group. The lawsuit worked its way through the courts throughout the 2018 season.

On October 12, 2018, with two games remaining in the regular season, the owner of the Cleveland Browns (Jimmy Haslam) released a statement stating he, along with other local groups, was in the process of buying the Crew. MLS later released a statement stating their willingness to keep the Crew in Columbus, and that Precourt would get the rights to start a team in Austin if the deal went through.

== Review ==
Columbus finished in third place in the inaugural Pacific Rim Cup during preseason. Facing a pair of Japanese opponents, Crew SC were defeated by Hokkaido Consadole Sapporo in the semifinals, but bounced back with a victory over Iwaki FC in the consolation game. Columbus then took part in the Carolina Challenge Cup, winning that title for the second consecutive season. Crew SC won all three matches in the tournament, claiming the CCC championship for the third time in club history.

Columbus additionally won each of their midseason rivalry matches, defeating Toronto FC across two games for the Trillium Cup and dispatching FC Dallas on tiebreakers to defend the Lamar Hunt Pioneer Cup. Against Toronto, Columbus was trailing in the aggregate series by a 3–2 line inside of the final 30 minutes of the season series; the Crew put in three late goals to tie the match and win the cup. The match against Dallas ended in a scoreless draw, with Columbus retaining the cup based on the head-to-head goals tiebreaker. Crew SC won the Pioneer Cup for the seventh time that it had been contested.

Columbus qualified for the playoffs for the second consecutive season, again finishing in fifth place in the Eastern Conference. Just as in 2017, Crew SC was victorious in a penalty shootout on the road in the knockout round, this time advancing past D.C. United with goalkeeper Zack Steffen making two saves. However, Columbus was eliminated in the conference semifinals by New York Red Bulls after suffering a 3–0 defeat in the second leg. In the U.S. Open Cup, Crew SC were eliminated in the fourth round by Chicago Fire, with the tie coming down to a penalty shootout. Crew SC goalkeeper Logan Ketterer had his shot saved in the eleventh round of kicks.

== Roster ==
As of September 11, 2018

Note: Flags indicate national team as defined under FIFA eligibility rules; some limited exceptions apply. Players may hold more than one non-FIFA nationality.

No.	Pos.	Nation	Player
2	DF	USA	Ricardo Clark
3	DF	USA	Josh Williams
4	DF	GHA	Jonathan Mensah (INT)
6	MF	USA	Wil Trapp (Captain; HGP)
7	MF	POR	Pedro Santos (INT; DP)
8	MF	BRA	Artur (INT)
9	FW	IRQ	Justin Meram
10	FW	ARG	Federico Higuaín (DP)
11	FW	USA	Gyasi Zardes
12	GK	USA	Ben Lundgaard (SUP)
13	MF	USA	Mike Grella
14	FW	USA	Adam Jahn
16	MF	USA	Hector Jiménez
17	DF	GHA	Lalas Abubakar (INT; SUP)

No.	Pos.	Nation	Player
18	MF	PAN	Cristian Martínez
19	DF	ARG	Milton Valenzuela (INT; YDP)
20	MF	ARG	Eduardo Sosa (INT)
21	DF	USA	Alex Crognale (HGP; SUP)
22	DF	ARG	Gastón Sauro
23	GK	USA	Zack Steffen
24	GK	USA	Jon Kempin
25	DF	GHA	Harrison Afful
26	MF	USA	Luis Argudo (SUP)
27	FW	USA	Edward Opoku (SUP; GA)
28	MF	DEN	Niko Hansen (SUP)
30	GK	USA	Logan Ketterer (SUP)
31	DF	USA	Connor Maloney (SUP)
32	FW	USA	Patrick Mullins

== Technical Staff ==
Position	Staff
President, Precourt Sports Ventures	(United States) Dave Greeley
President of Business Operations	(United States) Andy Loughnane
Director of Soccer Operations	(United States) Asher Mendelsohn
Sporting Director/Head Coach	(United States) Gregg Berhalter
Assistant Coach	(Spain) Nico Estévez
Assistant Coach	(Canada) Pat Onstad
Assistant Coach	(United States) Josh Wolff
High Performance Director	(United States) Steve Tashjian
Head of Player Recruitment and International Relations	(Brazil) Ricardo Moreira
Video Performance Analyst	(Netherlands) David Handgraaf
Director of Team Operations	(United States) Zach Crusse
Head Equipment Manager	(United States) David Brauzer
Strength/Conditioning Coach	(United States) Brook Hamilton
Fitness Coach	(Portugal) Federico Pizzuto
Data Analyst	(United States) Alex Mysiw
Assistant Equipment Manager	(United States) Ron Meadors
Head Athletic Trainer	(United States) Chris Shenberger
Assistant Trainer	(United States) Daniel Givens
Dietician	(United States) Jay Short
Team Coordinator	(United States) Julio Velasquez

Source: []

== Non-competitive ==
=== Preseason ===
On October 5, 2017, Crew SC were announced as a participant in the 2018 Carolina Challenge Cup, the fifth time that the club was to participate in the tournament. Columbus entered the event as defending champions. On November 13, 2017, the club announced that they would also take part in the inaugural Pacific Rim Cup during preseason. Crew SC were joined by Vancouver Whitecaps FC from MLS, as well as Hokkaido Consadole Sapporo and Iwaki FC from Japan. Columbus was drawn against Consadole Sapporo, with the winner advancing to the championship match and the loser going to the third place match. During preseason Crew SC called up Sean Zawadzki, Aboubacar Keita and Colin Biros from the academy to participate with the first team.

January 31 Friendly	Columbus Crew SC	2–1	Colorado Rapids	Casa Grande, AZ
	Zardes 2'; Argudo 58'	Report	Ford (yellow card) 20', (goal) 35'; Serna (yellow card) 82'	Stadium: Grande Sports Academy

February 4 Friendly	Columbus Crew SC	2–1	Seattle Sounders FC	Tucson, AZ
	Biros 5'; Jahn 78'	Report	Rodríguez 28'; Saari (yellow card) 81'	Stadium: Mulcahy Soccer Stadium

February 9 Pacific Rim Cup	Hokkaido Consadole Sapporo	3–2	Columbus Crew SC	Halawa, HI
1:00 AM EST	Reis 25'; Hayasaka 45'; Miyoshi 48'	Report	Zardes 13', 39' (pen.)	Stadium: Aloha Stadium; Referee: Robert Sibiga

February 10 Pacific Rim Cup Third Place Game	Iwaki FC	3–5	Columbus Crew SC	Halawa, HI
9:00 PM EST	Hisanaga 34'; Hiraoka 66'; Yoshida 77'	Report	Zardes 33'; Higuaín 48' (pen.); Abubakar 52'; Crognale (yellow card) 71'; Opoku 73'; Argudo 90'	Stadium: Aloha Stadium; Referee: Allen Chapman

February 17 Carolina Challenge Cup	Atlanta United FC	1–3	Columbus Crew SC	Charleston, SC
5:00 PM EST	González Pírez (yellow card) 54'; Martínez 90'	Report	Santos 13'; Abubakar (yellow card) 31'; Martínez 33'; J. Martínez 71' (o.g.)	Stadium: MUSC Health Stadium

February 21 Carolina Challenge Cup	Charleston Battery	1–2	Columbus Crew SC	Charleston, SC
5:00 PM EST	Svantesson 32'	Report	Zardes 56', 82'	Stadium: MUSC Health Stadium; Referee: José Carlos Rivero

February 24 Carolina Challenge Cup	Columbus Crew SC	2–0	Minnesota United FC	Charleston, SC
5:00 PM EST	Higuaín 32'; Zardes 37'; Jonathan (yellow card) 59'	Report	Boxall (yellow card) 65'	Stadium: MUSC Health Stadium
Note: Columbus finish 1st place in the Carolina Challenge Cup.

=== Midseason ===
March 25 Friendly	Columbus Crew SC	2–4	FC Cincinnati	Obetz, OH
	Jahn 5'; Jiménez 28'	Report	Cicerone 28'; Haber 32'; Welshman 62'; Ledesma	Stadium: Crew Training Center

April 22 Friendly	Columbus Crew SC	3–2	Louisville Cardinals	Obetz, OH
	Jahn 2'; Grella; Opoku 60'	Report	58'; 82'	Stadium: Crew Training Center

July 3 Friendly	Columbus Crew SC	2–0	Deportivo Saprissa	Columbus, OH
7:00 PM EDT	Zardes 28'; Williams 34'	Report		Stadium: MAPFRE Stadium; Attendance: 7,023; Referee: Brandon Artis
Note: Match was played with 30-minute halves.

== Competitive ==
=== Overview ===
Competition	First match	Last match	Starting round	Final position	Record							
Competition	First match	Last match	Starting round	Final position	Pld	W	D	L	GF	GA	GD	Win %
Major League Soccer	March 3, 2018	October 28, 2018	Matchday 1	10th	34	14	9	11	43	45	−2	41.18
MLS Cup Playoffs	November 1, 2018	November 11, 2018	Knockout Round	Conference Semifinals	3	1	1	1	3	3	+0	33.33
U.S. Open Cup	June 6, 2018	June 6, 2018	Fourth Round	Fourth Round	1	0	1	0	2	2	+0	0.00
Total					38	15	11	12	48	50	−2	39.47

Source: Competitions

=== MLS ===
==== Standings ====
===== Eastern Conference =====
Pos	Team	Pld	W	L	T	GF	GA	GD	Pts	Qualification
3	New York City FC	34	16	10	8	59	45	+14	56	Qualification for the knockout round
4	D.C. United	34	14	11	9	60	50	+10	51	Qualification for the knockout round
5	Columbus Crew	34	14	11	9	43	45	−2	51	Qualification for the knockout round
6	Philadelphia Union	34	15	14	5	49	50	−1	50	Qualification for the knockout round
7	Montreal Impact	34	14	16	4	47	53	−6	46	

Source: MLS

===== Overall table =====
Pos	Team	Pld	W	L	T	GF	GA	GD	Pts
8	Portland Timbers	34	15	10	9	54	48	+6	54
9	D.C. United	34	14	11	9	60	50	+10	51
10	Columbus Crew	34	14	11	9	43	45	−2	51
11	Philadelphia Union	34	15	14	5	49	50	−1	50
12	Real Salt Lake	34	14	13	7	55	58	−3	49

Source: MLS
Rules for classification: 1) points; 2) total wins; 3) total goal differential; 4) total goals scored; 5) disciplinary points; 6) away goals scored; 7) away goal differential; 8) coin toss or drawing of lots

===== Aggregate table =====
As Toronto FC won MLS Cup 2017, one of the U.S. berths for the 2019 CONCACAF Champions League had to be reallocated, to the U.S. non-champions with the best aggregate record over the 2017 and 2018 MLS regular seasons. As the top ranked team in the table, Atlanta United FC, also qualified for the Champions League by winning MLS Cup 2018, the Champions League spot via the aggregate table was instead awarded to the second-placed team, the New York Red Bulls.

Note: Only U.S. teams are listed in this table.

Pos	Team	Pld	W	L	T	GF	GA	GD	Pts	Qualification
5	Sporting Kansas City	68	30	17	21	105	69	+36	111	2019 CONCACAF Champions League (Note: As 2017 U.S. Open Cup champions (USA2))
6	Portland Timbers	68	30	21	17	114	98	+16	107	
7	Columbus Crew	68	30	23	15	96	94	+2	105	
8	FC Dallas	68	27	19	22	100	92	+8	103	
9	Real Salt Lake	68	27	28	13	104	113	−9	94	

Source: MLS
Rules for classification: 1) points; 2) total wins; 3) total goal differential; 4) total goals scored; 5) disciplinary points; 6) away goals scored; 7) away goal differential; 8) coin toss or drawing of lots

==== Results summary ====
Overall								Home						Away					
Pld	Pts	W	L	T	GF	GA	GD	W	L	T	GF	GA	GD	W	L	T	GF	GA	GD
34	51	14	11	9	43	45	−2	11	2	4	32	21	+11	3	9	5	11	24	−13

Source: MLS standings
Pld = Matches played; Pts = Points; W = Matches won; T = Matches tied; L = Matches lost; GF = Goals for; GA = Goals against; GD = Goal difference

==== Results by round ====
Round	1	2	3	4	5	6	7	8	9	10	11	12	13	14	15	16	17	18	19	20	21	22	23	24	25	26	27	28	29	30	31	32	33	34
Stadium	A	H	A	H	H	A	A	H	H	A	H	H	A	A	H	H	H	A	H	A	A	H	A	H	A	A	H	A	A	H	H	A	A	H
Result	W	W	D	W	L	L	L	D	W	D	W	W	W	D	D	D	L	L	W	L	L	W	W	W	L	D	W	D	L	W	D	L	L	W

Source: Columbus schedule
A = Away; H = Home; W = Win; D = Draw; L = Loss

==== Match results ====
On December 19, 2017, the league announced the home openers for every club. Just like in 2016, Columbus opened the season on the road against the defending MLS Cup champions, playing at Toronto FC in the first match of the MLS season. Columbus then opened the season at home on March 10, facing Montreal Impact.

The schedule for the remainder of the 2018 season was released on January 4, 2018. Crew SC played three times against Chicago Fire and Philadelphia Union, twice against every other Eastern Conference club, and once against every Western Conference club.

March 3 1	Toronto FC	0–2	Columbus Crew SC	Toronto, ON
1:00 PM EST		Report	Martínez (yellow card) 24'; Higuaín 44'; Zardes 46'	Stadium: BMO Field; Attendance: 26,633; Referee: Ismail Elfath; Assistant referees: Corey Parker; Philippe Brière; Fourth official: Sorin Stoica

March 10 2	Columbus Crew SC	3–2	Montreal Impact	Columbus, OH
1:00 PM EST	Higuaín 12' (pen.); Zardes 15', 90+4' (pen.); Steffen (yellow card) 51'	Report	Krolicki (yellow card) 32'; Piatti 59'; Edwards 85'	Stadium: MAPFRE Stadium; Attendance: 11,098; Referee: Chris Penso; Assistant referees: C.J. Morgante; Brian Dunn; Fourth official: Alejandro Mariscal

March 17 3	Philadelphia Union	0–0	Columbus Crew SC	Chester, PA
2:00 PM EDT	Bedoya (yellow card) 76'; Rosenberry (yellow card) 89'	Report	Artur (yellow card) 53'; Higuaín (yellow card) 78'	Stadium: Talen Energy Stadium; Attendance: 15,323; Referee: Nima Saghafi; Assistant referees: Peter Manikowski; Peter Balciunas; Fourth official: Marcos de Oliveira

March 24 4	Columbus Crew SC	3–1	D.C. United	Columbus, OH
6:00 PM EDT	Abubakar (yellow card) 3'; Valenzuela 20', (yellow card) 52'; Clark 40'; Pedro Santos 42'	Report	Asad 30'	Stadium: MAPFRE Stadium; Attendance: 8,443; Referee: Drew Fischer; Assistant referees: Jason White; Danny Thornberry; Fourth official: Alex Chilowicz

March 31 5	Columbus Crew SC	1–2	Vancouver Whitecaps FC	Columbus, OH
3:00 PM EDT	Zardes 29' Valenzuela (yellow card) 76'	Report	de Jong (yellow card) 10'; Shea 51'; Kamara 78'; Felipe (yellow card) 82'	Stadium: MAPFRE Stadium; Attendance: 8,992; Referee: Jose Carlos Rivero; Assistant referees: Corey Parker; Adam Wienckowski; Fourth official: Hilario Grajeda

April 7 6	Chicago Fire	1–0	Columbus Crew SC	Bridgeview, IL
8:30 PM EDT	Kappelhof (yellow card) 6'; Nikolić 27', (yellow card) 90+4'; Sánchez (yellow card) 90'	Report	Artur (yellow card) 47'	Stadium: Toyota Park; Attendance: 11,023; Referee: Jair Marrufo; Assistant referees: Ian Anderson; Peter Balciunas; Fourth official: Victor Rivas

April 14 7	D.C. United	1–0	Columbus Crew SC	Annapolis, MD
7:00 PM EDT	Segura 1'; Arriola (red card) 51'; Clark (yellow card) 84'	Report	Higuaín (yellow card) 23'; Jonathan (yellow card) 84'	Stadium: Navy–Marine Corps Memorial Stadium; Attendance: 12,396; Referee: Ismail Elfath; Assistant referees: Corey Parker; T.J. Zablocki; Fourth official: Rubiel Vazquez

April 21 8	Columbus Crew SC	2–2	New England Revolution	Columbus, OH
7:30 PM EDT	Farrell 9' (o.g.); Zardes 43'; Higuaín (yellow card) 66'	Report	Dielna (yellow card) 11': Bunbury 14'; Zahibo (yellow card) 36'; Penilla 45+1'; Fagúndez (yellow card) 60'; Somi (yellow card) 67'; Turner (yellow card) 88'	Stadium: MAPFRE Stadium; Attendance: 11,264; Referee: Chris Penso; Assistant referees: Jeff Hosking; Jeremy Kieso; Fourth official: Marcos de Oliveira

April 28 9	Columbus Crew SC	2–1	San Jose Earthquakes	Columbus, OH
7:30 PM EDT	Harrison 28'; Hansen (yellow card) 36'; Valenzuela (yellow card) 67'; Grella 84'	Report	Godoy (yellow card) 3'; Hoesen 45', (yellow card) 72'; Jungwirth (yellow card) 66'	Stadium: MAPFRE Stadium; Attendance: 11,479; Referee: Fotis Bazakos; Assistant referees: C.J. Morgante; Gianni Facchini; Fourth official: Joe Dickerson

May 5 10	Seattle Sounders FC	0–0	Columbus Crew SC	Seattle, WA
4:00 PM EDT	Alonso (yellow card) 30'	Report	Pedro Santos (red card) 15'; Trapp (yellow card) 54'	Stadium: CenturyLink Field; Attendance: 39,515; Referee: Hilario Grajeda; Assistant referees: Jonathan Johnson; Eduardo Mariscal; Fourth official: Alejandro Mariscal

May 9 11	Columbus Crew SC	1–0	Philadelphia Union	Columbus, OH
7:30 PM EDT	Jonathan (yellow card) 27'; Zardes 53'	Report	Elliott (yellow card) 77'	Stadium: MAPFRE Stadium; Attendance: 7,683; Referee: Ramy Touchan; Assistant referees: Ian Anderson; Corey Parker; Fourth official: Robert Sibiga

May 12 12	Columbus Crew SC	3–0	Chicago Fire	Columbus, OH
7:30 PM EDT	Higuaín 28' (pen.); Zardes 50', (yellow card) 57', (goal) 70'	Report	Ellis (yellow card) 27'	Stadium: MAPFRE Stadium; Attendance: 11,108; Referee: Allen Chapman; Assistant referees: Adam Wienckowski; Mike Kampmeinert; Fourth official: Marcos de Oliveira

May 19 13	New England Revolution	0–1	Columbus Crew SC	Foxborough, MA
7:30 PM EDT	Caicedo (yellow card) 13'; Delamea (yellow card) 31'; Dielna (yellow card) 67'; Anibaba (yellow card) 89'	Report	Valenzuela (yellow card) 44'; Abubakar 85'	Stadium: Gillette Stadium; Attendance: 14,087; Referee: Sorin Stoica; Assistant referees: Oscar Mitchell-Carvalho; Kathryn Nesbitt; Fourth official: Alan Kelly

May 27 14	Sporting Kansas City	0–0	Columbus Crew SC	Kansas City, KS
6:00 PM EDT	Besler (yellow card) 90+4'	Report	Higuaín (red card) 45+6'; Harrison (yellow card) 49'	Stadium: Children's Mercy Park; Attendance: 20,697; Referee: Robert Sibiga; Assistant referees: Jason White; Kevin Klinger; Fourth official: Daniel Radford

June 2 15	Columbus Crew SC	3–3	Toronto FC	Columbus, OH
7:30 PM EDT	Artur (yellow card) 2'; Williams (yellow card) 56'; Zardes 67'; Crognale 81'; Higuaín 90' (pen.)	Report	Osorio (yellow card) 8'; Vázquez 17' (pen.); Hernandez (yellow card) 21'; Ricketts 38', (yellow card) 90+3'; Giovinco 57'; Bono (yellow card) 86'; Fraser (yellow card) 90+2'	Stadium: MAPFRE Stadium; Attendance: 12,305; Referee: Nima Saghafi; Assistant referees: Jeremy Hanson; Eric Weisbrod; Fourth official: David Barrie

June 9 16	Columbus Crew SC	1–1	New York Red Bulls	Columbus, OH
5:00 PM EDT	Zardes 26'	Report	Muyl 57'	Stadium: MAPFRE Stadium; Attendance: 11,246; Referee: Alan Kelly; Assistant referees: Matt Nelson; Logan Brown; Fourth official: Rubiel Vazquez

June 13 17	Columbus Crew SC	0–2	Atlanta United FC	Columbus, OH
7:30 PM EDT	Trapp (yellow card) 81'	Report	Parkhurst (yellow card) 8'; Ambrose (yellow card) 27'; Martínez 30'; Escobar (yellow card) 72'; Villalba 82'	Stadium: MAPFRE Stadium; Attendance: 10,132; Referee: Ted Unkel; Assistant referees: Kyle Atkins; T.J. Zablocki; Fourth official: Hilario Grajeda

June 23 18	Los Angeles FC	2–0	Columbus Crew SC	Los Angeles, CA
10:30 PM EDT	Ciman 4'; Diomande 8'; Atuesta (yellow card) 24'	Report	Abubakar (yellow card) 34'; Pedro Santos (yellow card) 61'; Higuaín (yellow card) 69'; Valenzuela (yellow card) 70'	Stadium: Banc of California Stadium; Attendance: 22,000; Referee: Kevin Stott; Assistant referees: Adam Garner; Felisha Mariscal; Fourth official: Baldomero Toledo

June 30 19	Columbus Crew SC	2–1	Real Salt Lake	Columbus, OH
7:30 PM EDT	Zardes 6' (pen.); Sosa 23', (yellow card) 66'	Report	Sunny (yellow card) 45+2'; Beckerman (yellow card) 56'; Rusnák 74'; Savarino (yellow card) 90+1'	Stadium: MAPFRE Stadium; Attendance: 16,680; Referee: Drew Fischer; Assistant referees: Richard Gamache; Brian Dunn; Fourth official: Marcos de Oliveira

July 7 20	LA Galaxy	4–0	Columbus Crew SC	Carson, CA
10:30 PM EDT	Skjelvik (yellow card) 22'; Kamara 42'; Ibrahimović 56' (pen.); Pontius (yellow card) 63'; Alessandrini 67', 90+3'	Report	Williams (yellow card) 61'	Stadium: StubHub Center; Attendance: 21,211; Referee: Hilario Grajeda; Assistant referees: Jonathan Johnson; Eduardo Mariscal; Fourth official: Ismir Pekmic

July 14 21	New York City FC	2–0	Columbus Crew SC	New York, NY
7:00 PM EDT	Medina 80'; Tinnerholm 90'	Report	Jonathan (yellow card) 20'; Zardes (yellow card) 36'; Grella (yellow card) 82'; Sosa (red card) 90+3'	Stadium: Yankee Stadium; Attendance: 21,085; Referee: Armando Villarreal; Assistant referees: Richard Gamache; Jeffrey Greeson; Fourth official: Nima Saghafi

July 21 22	Columbus Crew SC	3–2	Orlando City SC	Columbus, OH
7:30 PM EDT	Jonathan (yellow card) 26'; Zardes 51', 88' (pen.); Pedro Santos (yellow card) 84'; Trapp 90+2'; Williams (yellow card) 90+5'	Report	Kljestan 16', (yellow card) 43'; Schuler (yellow card) 26'; Pinho 58'; El-Munir (yellow card) 87'; Yotún (yellow card) 90+3'	Stadium: MAPFRE Stadium; Attendance: 14,052; Referee: Silviu Petrescu; Assistant referees: Gianni Facchini; Apolinar Mariscal; Fourth official: David Gantar

July 28 23	New York Red Bulls	2–3	Columbus Crew SC	Harrison, NJ
7:00 PM EDT	Collin (yellow card) 21'; Jonathan 50' (o.g.); Royer 69'	Report	Jonathan 7'; Mullins 24'; Davis 31' (o.g.); Valenzuela (yellow card) 56'; Steffen (yellow card) 77'; Artur (yellow card) 90'	Stadium: Red Bull Arena; Attendance: 16,459; Referee: Sorin Stoica; Assistant referees: Richard Gamache; Peter Balciunas; Fourth official: Farhad Dadkho

August 11 24	Columbus Crew SC	1–0	Houston Dynamo	Columbus, OH
7:30 PM EDT	Zardes (yellow card) 56', (goal) 90+1'; Pedro Santos (yellow card) 90+7'	Report	Leonardo (yellow card) 80'; Lundqvist (yellow card) 86'	Stadium: MAPFRE Stadium; Attendance: 15,891; Referee: Mark Geiger; Assistant referees: Logan Brown; Oscar Mitchell-Carvalho; Fourth official: Rubiel Vazquez

August 19 25	Atlanta United FC	3–1	Columbus Crew SC	Atlanta, GA
4:00 PM EDT	Martínez 31'; McCann (yellow card) 45+1'; Villalba 76', (yellow card) 86'; Almirón 82', (yellow card) 83'; Guzan (yellow card) 88'	Report	Zardes 50'; Artur (yellow card) 90+4'	Stadium: Mercedes-Benz Stadium; Attendance: 45,303; Referee: Jair Marrufo; Assistant referees: Ian Anderson; Jeffrey Greeson; Fourth official: Marcos de Oliveira

August 23 26	Chicago Fire	1–1	Columbus Crew SC	Bridgeview, IL
7:00 PM EDT	de Leeuw (yellow card) 55'; Nikolić 67'; Katai (yellow card) 69'; Schweinsteiger (yellow card) 90+1'	Report	Higuaín (yellow card) 65'; Hansen 87'	Stadium: Toyota Park; Attendance: 8,551; Referee: Armando Villarreal; Assistant referees: Adam Garner; T.J. Zablocki; Fourth official: Fotis Bazakos

September 1 27	Columbus Crew SC	2–1	New York City FC	Columbus, OH
8:00 PM EDT	Harrison 61'; Meram 63'	Report	Wallace (yellow card) 45'; Tajouri-Shradi 53'; Sweat (yellow card) 67'; Ibeagha (yellow card) 75'; Ring (yellow card) 90+3'	Stadium: MAPFRE Stadium; Attendance: 11,991; Referee: Alan Kelly; Assistant referees: Adam Wienckowski; Nick Uranga; Fourth official: Nima Saghafi

September 15 28	FC Dallas	0–0	Columbus Crew SC	Frisco, TX
8:00 PM EDT		Report	Clark (yellow card) 53'; Abubakar (yellow card) 67'	Stadium: Toyota Stadium; Attendance: 16,030; Referee: Hilario Grajeda; Assistant referees: Corey Rockwell; Mike Kampmeinert; Fourth official: Joe Dickerson

September 19 29	Portland Timbers	3–2	Columbus Crew SC	Portland, OR
10:30 PM EDT	Polo (yellow card) 10', (goal) 37'; Guzmán 18', (yellow card) 34'; Abubakar 48' (o.g.)	Report	Hansen 7', 90+3'; Sauro (yellow card) 45+1'; Trapp (yellow card) 49'; Maloney (yellow card) 85'	Stadium: Providence Park; Attendance: 21,144; Referee: Ted Unkel; Assistant referees: Frank Anderson; Eduardo Mariscal; Fourth official: Sorin Stoica

September 22 30	Columbus Crew SC	2–1	Colorado Rapids	Columbus, OH
7:30 PM EDT	Zardes 17'; Jonathan (yellow card) 44'; Higuaín 57'	Report	Gashi 26'; Wynne (red card) 51'; Acosta (yellow card) 81'; Smith (yellow card) 90+1'	Stadium: MAPFRE Stadium; Attendance: 19,121; Referee: Allen Chapman; Assistant referees: C.J. Morgante; Ian Anderson; Fourth official: Silviu Petrescu

September 29 31	Columbus Crew SC	0–0	Philadelphia Union	Columbus, OH
7:30 PM EDT		Report	Fabinho (yellow card) 85'; Bedoya (yellow card) 88'	Stadium: MAPFRE Stadium; Attendance: 12,441; Referee: Drew Fischer; Assistant referees: Kathryn Nesbitt; Peter Manikowski; Fourth official: David Gantar

October 6 32	Montreal Impact	3–0	Columbus Crew SC	Montreal, QC
3:00 PM EDT	Taïder 32' (pen.); Silva 44'; Piatti 59'; Azira (yellow card) 62'	Report	Pedro Santos (yellow card) 45+2'; Jonathan (yellow card) 90'	Stadium: Stade Saputo; Attendance: 19,015; Referee: Alan Kelly; Assistant referees: Joe Fletcher; Matt Nelson; Fourth official: Chris Penso

October 21 33	Orlando City SC	2–1	Columbus Crew SC	Orlando, FL
3:00 PM EDT	Dwyer (yellow card) 37'; Yotún 57' (pen.); Kljestan 90+6' (pen.)	Report	Jonathan (yellow card) 33'; Higuaín 54'	Stadium: Orlando City Stadium; Attendance: 23,642; Referee: Kevin Stott; Assistant referees: Kevin Klinger; Eduardo Mariscal; Fourth official: Marcos de Oliveira

October 28 34	Columbus Crew SC	3–2	Minnesota United FC	Columbus, OH
4:30 PM EDT	Zardes 11', 49', 83'	Report	Calvo 68', 77'	Stadium: MAPFRE Stadium; Attendance: 17,677; Referee: Robert Sibiga; Assistant referees: Jason White; Jose Da Silva; Fourth official: Rubiel Vazquez

=== MLS Cup Playoffs ===
==== Knockout Round ====
November 1 Knockout Round	D.C. United	2–2 (a.e.t.) (2–3 p)	Columbus Crew SC	Washington, D.C.
8:00 PM EDT	Brillant 21'; DeLeon 116'	Report	Higuaín 30', (yellow card) 45', (goal) 96'; Sosa (yellow card) 105+1'	Stadium: Audi Field; Attendance: 20,600; Referee: Allen Chapman; Assistant referees: Jeremy Hanson; Brian Poeschel; Fourth official: Silviu Petrescu
	Penalties
	Rooney (penalty missed); Asad (penalty scored); Stieber (penalty scored); Acosta (penalty missed); DeLeon (penalty missed)		(penalty scored) Higuaín; (penalty scored) Trapp; (penalty missed) Zardes; (penalty scored) Hansen; (penalty missed) Mullins

==== Conference Semifinals ====
November 4 Leg 1	Columbus Crew SC	1–0	New York Red Bulls	Columbus, OH
3:00 PM EST	Valenzuela (yellow card) 31'; Zardes 61'	Report	Davis (yellow card) 88'	Stadium: MAPFRE Stadium; Attendance: 12,892; Referee: Nima Saghafi; Assistant referees: Peter Manikowski; Jose Da Silva; Fourth official: Armando Villarreal

November 11 Leg 2	New York Red Bulls	3–0 (3–1 agg.)	Columbus Crew SC	Harrison, NJ
7:30 PM EST	Muyl 17'; Royer 73', 76'	Report		Stadium: Red Bull Arena; Attendance: 22,789; Referee: Alan Kelly; Assistant referees: Jason White; Eric Weisbrod; Fourth official: Baldomero Toledo

=== U.S. Open Cup ===
June 6 Fourth Round	Columbus Crew SC (MLS) (Ohio)	2–2 (a.e.t.) (9–10 p)	(Illinois) Chicago Fire (MLS)	Columbus, OH
7:00 PM EDT	Martínez 10'; Sosa (yellow card) 64'Abu (yellow card) 71'; Crognale (yellow card) 107'; Jahn 114'	Report	Nikolić 45', 109'; Ramos (yellow card) 81'; McCarty (yellow card) 90+3'; Katai (yellow card) 112'	Stadium: MAPFRE Stadium; Attendance: 4,992; Referee: Marcos de Oliveira; Assistant referees: Art Arustamyan; Jeffrey Swartzel; Fourth official: Kevin Fikar
	Penalties
	Valenzuela (penalty scored); Jiménez (penalty missed); Argudo (penalty scored); Abubakar (penalty scored); Jahn (penalty scored); Martínez (penalty scored); Crognale (penalty scored); Sosa (penalty scored); Abu (penalty scored); Opoku (penalty scored); Ketterer (penalty missed)		(penalty missed) Nikolić; (penalty scored) Katai; (penalty scored) McCarty; (penalty scored) Campos; (penalty scored) Schweinsteiger; (penalty scored) Bronico; (penalty scored) Lillard; (penalty scored) Corrales; (penalty scored) Ramos; (penalty scored) Campbell; (penalty scored) Sánchez

== Statistics ==
=== Appearances and goals ===
Federico Higuaín entered the season sitting fifth in club history for most goals, needing three to pass Edson Buddle for fourth all-time. He tallied a penalty kick against Chicago on May 12, cracking the tie with Buddle. Higuaín had also begun the year having appeared 163 times for Crew SC, needing seven appearances to crack the top ten in club history. He started each of the first ten games, leaping Frankie Hejduk for ninth place. By the end of the season, Higuaín moved up the charts in all three categories: eighth all-time in appearances, with 196; third all-time in goals, with 58; and second all-time in assists, with 64.

Upon his return to the club midway through the season, Justin Meram had the chance to add to his previous totals with the club; he sat fifth in appearances, sixth in goals, and tied for seventh in assists. He needed to play 28 times, score ten goals, or tally six assists in order to move up the charts. At the end of the year, Meram still sat fifth in appearances (with 225) and sixth in goals (with 43), but had taken sole possession of seventh in assists (with 36).

Wil Trapp began the season having appeared 144 times in all competitions for Crew SC, needing to play in 27 games to crack the all-time top ten. Although he missed several games while on international duty, Trapp appeared for the 27th time on the season in a draw with Philadelphia on September 29. He initially jumped into the table in a tie for tenth place with Hejduk. By the end of the season, Trapp had appeared in 177 games for the club, enough for sole possession of tenth.

No.	Pos	Nat	Player	Total		MLS		MLS Cup Playoffs		U.S. Open Cup	
No.	Pos	Nat	Player	Apps	Goals	Apps	Goals	Apps	Goals	Apps	Goals
2	DF	(United States) USA	Ricardo Clark	13	1	8+5	1	0+0	0	0+0	0
3	DF	(United States) USA	Josh Williams	22	0	16+5	0	1+0	0	0+0	0
4	DF	(Ghana) GHA	Jonathan Mensah	30	1	26+1	1	3+0	0	0+0	0
6	MF	(United States) USA	Wil Trapp	33	1	29+1	1	3+0	0	0+0	0
7	MF	(Portugal) POR	Pedro Santos	33	1	29+1	1	2+1	0	0+0	0
8	MF	(Brazil) BRA	Artur	35	0	32+0	0	3+0	0	0+0	0
9	FW	(Iraq) IRQ	Justin Meram	12	1	7+2	1	3+0	0	0+0	0
10	FW	(Argentina) ARG	Federico Higuaín	33	8	27+3	6	2+1	2	0+0	0
11	FW	(United States) USA	Gyasi Zardes	36	20	33+0	19	3+0	1	0+0	0
12	GK	(United States) USA	Ben Lundgaard	0	0	0+0	0	0+0	0	0+0	0
13	MF	(United States) USA	Mike Grella	12	1	5+7	1	0+0	0	0+0	0
14	FW	(United States) USA	Adam Jahn	9	1	0+8	0	0+0	0	1+0	1
16	MF	(United States) USA	Hector Jiménez	13	0	7+4	0	0+1	0	1+0	0
17	DF	(Ghana) GHA	Lalas Abubakar	25	1	20+3	1	0+1	0	0+1	0
18	MF	(Panama) PAN	Cristian Martínez	16	1	11+3	0	0+1	0	1+0	1
19	DF	(Argentina) ARG	Milton Valenzuela	34	1	29+1	1	3+0	0	0+1	0
20	MF	(Venezuela) VEN	Eduardo Sosa	12	1	3+7	1	0+1	0	1+0	0
21	DF	(United States) USA	Alex Crognale	6	1	0+5	1	0+0	0	1+0	0
22	DF	(Argentina) ARG	Gastón Sauro	10	0	6+1	0	2+0	0	1+0	0
23	GK	(United States) USA	Zack Steffen	32	0	29+0	0	3+0	0	0+0	0
24	GK	(United States) USA	Jon Kempin	5	0	5+0	0	0+0	0	0+0	0
25	DF	(Ghana) GHA	Harrison Afful	35	2	32+0	2	3+0	0	0+0	0
26	MF	(United States) USA	Luis Argudo	21	0	6+12	0	1+1	0	1+0	0
27	FW	(United States) USA	Edward Opoku	5	0	1+4	0	0+0	0	0+0	0
28	MF	(Denmark) DEN	Niko Hansen	24	3	11+11	3	0+1	0	1+0	0
30	GK	(United States) USA	Logan Ketterer	1	0	0+0	0	0+0	0	1+0	0
31	DF	(United States) USA	Connor Maloney	2	0	0+1	0	0+0	0	1+0	0
32	FW	(United States) USA	Patrick Mullins	13	1	2+8	1	1+2	0	0+0	0
			Own goal	0	2	-	2	-	0	-	0
Players who left Columbus during the season:
5	MF	(Ghana) GHA	Mohammed Abu	5	0	0+4	0	0+0	0	1+0	0

Source: Columbus stats

=== Disciplinary record ===
No.	Pos.	Name	MLS		MLS Playoffs		U.S. Open Cup		Total	
No.	Pos.	Name	Yellow card	Red card	Yellow card	Red card	Yellow card	Red card	Yellow card	Red card
2	MF	(United States) Ricardo Clark	1	0	0	0	0	0	1	0
3	DF	(United States) Josh Williams	3	0	0	0	0	0	3	0
4	DF	(Ghana) Jonathan Mensah	7	0	0	0	0	0	7	0
6	MF	(United States) Wil Trapp	3	0	0	0	0	0	3	0
7	MF	(Portugal) Pedro Santos	4	1	0	0	0	0	4	1
8	MF	(Brazil) Artur	5	0	0	0	0	0	5	0
9	MF	(Iraq) Justin Meram	0	0	0	0	0	0	0	0
10	MF	(Argentina) Federico Higuaín	5	1	1	0	0	0	6	1
11	FW	(United States) Gyasi Zardes	3	0	0	0	0	0	3	0
12	GK	(United States) Ben Lundgaard	0	0	0	0	0	0	0	0
13	MF	(United States) Mike Grella	1	0	0	0	0	0	1	0
14	FW	(United States) Adam Jahn	0	0	0	0	0	0	0	0
16	MF	(United States) Hector Jiménez	0	0	0	0	0	0	0	0
17	DF	(Ghana) Lalas Abubakar	3	0	0	0	0	0	3	0
18	MF	(Panama) Cristian Martínez	1	0	0	0	0	0	1	0
19	DF	(Argentina) Milton Valenzuela	6	0	1	0	0	0	7	0
20	MF	(Venezuela) Eduardo Sosa	1	1	1	0	1	0	3	1
21	DF	(United States) Alex Crognale	0	0	0	0	1	0	1	0
22	DF	(Argentina) Gastón Sauro	1	0	0	0	0	0	1	0
23	GK	(United States) Zack Steffen	2	0	0	0	0	0	2	0
24	GK	(United States) Jon Kempin	0	0	0	0	0	0	0	0
25	DF	(Ghana) Harrison Afful	1	0	0	0	0	0	1	0
26	MF	(United States) Luis Argudo	0	0	0	0	0	0	0	0
27	FW	(Ghana) Edward Opoku	0	0	0	0	0	0	0	0
28	MF	(Denmark) Niko Hansen	1	0	0	0	0	0	1	0
30	GK	(Denmark) Logan Ketterer	0	0	0	0	0	0	0	0
31	DF	(United States) Connor Maloney	1	0	0	0	0	0	1	0
32	FW	(United States) Patrick Mullins	0	0	0	0	0	0	0	0
Players who left the club during the season:
5	MF	(Ghana) Mohammed Abu	0	0	0	0	1	0	1	0

Source: Columbus stats

=== Clean sheets ===
Zack Steffen entered the season with the seventh-most clean sheets in club history. He needed to keep two on the season in order to pass Brad Friedel for sixth all-time, which he did just three games into the campaign. Three saves in a scoreless draw with Philadelphia on March 17 moved Steffen up on the all-time chart. He promptly passed Mark Dougherty for fifth place, thanks to a 1–0 victory over the Union on May 9. Steffen finished the season with 22 career shutouts for Crew SC, good for fifth place in club history.

No.	Name	MLS	MLS Playoffs	U.S. Open Cup	Total	Games Played		
No.	Name	12	(United States) Ben Lundgaard	0	0	0	0	0
23	(United States) Zack Steffen	10	1	0	11	32		
24	(United States) Jon Kempin	0	0	0	0	5		
30	(United States) Logan Ketterer	0	0	0	0	1		

Source: Columbus stats

== Transfers ==
=== In ===
Pos.	Player	Transferred from	Fee/notes	Date	Source
MF	(Venezuela) Eduardo Sosa	(Venezuela) Zamora FC	Signed via discovery	January 9, 2018	
FW	(Ghana) Edward Opoku	(United States) Virginia Cavaliers	Selected in the second round of the 2018 MLS SuperDraft. Signed as a Generation Adidas player.	January 19, 2018	
FW	(United States) Gyasi Zardes	(United States) LA Galaxy	Traded for Ola Kamara and $400,000 targeted allocation money. If Kamara scores 12 or more goals for the Galaxy then Columbus will received $100,000 in targeted allocation money	January 20, 2018	
MF	(United States) Ricardo Clark	(United States) Houston Dynamo	Free agent signing	February 2, 2018	
MF	(United States) Luis Argudo	(United States) Wake Forest Demon Deacons	Selected in the third round of the 2018 MLS SuperDraft	March 1, 2018	
GK	(United States) Ben Lundgaard	(United States) Virginia Tech Hokies	Selected in the first round of the 2018 MLS SuperDraft	March 1, 2018	
FW	(United States) Patrick Mullins	(United States) D.C. United	Traded for $150,000 in targeted allocation money	July 11, 2018	
MF	(Iraq) Justin Meram	(United States) Orlando City SC	Traded for $750,000 in targeted allocation money, a 2019 international roster slot.	August 3, 2018	
DF	(Argentina) Milton Valenzuela	(Argentina) Newell's Old Boys	Completed permanent transfer. Signed as a Young Designated Player.	December 21, 2018	
GK	(United States) Joe Bendik	(United States) Orlando City SC	Traded for $50,000 in targeted allocation money	December 27, 2018	

=== Loan in ===
Pos.	Player	Parent club	Length/Notes	Beginning	End	Source
DF	(Argentina) Milton Valenzuela	(Argentina) Newell's Old Boys	Duration of the 2018 MLS season, with an option to purchase at the end of the season. Signed as a Young Designated Player.	January 26, 2018	November 26, 2018	

=== Out ===
Pos.	Player	Transferred to	Fee/notes	Date	Source
FW	(Norway) Ola Kamara	(United States) LA Galaxy	Traded with $400,000 targeted allocation money for Gyasi Zardes. If Kamara scores 12 or more goals for the Galaxy then Columbus will received $100,000 in targeted allocation money	January 20, 2018	
MF	(Iraq) Justin Meram	(United States) Orlando City SC	Traded for $300,000 in 2018 targeted allocation money, $300,000 in 2018 general allocation money, $450,000 in 2019 targeted allocation money and a 2019 international roster slot.	January 29, 2018	
MF	(Ghana) Mohammed Abu	(Norway) Vålerenga Fotball	Transfer, terms undisclosed	October 4, 2018	
MF	(United States) Mike Grella	Retired	Option declined	November 26, 2018	
FW	(United States) Adam Jahn	(United States) Phoenix Rising	Option declined	November 26, 2018	
GK	(United States) Logan Ketterer	(United States) El Paso Locomotive FC	Option declined	November 26, 2018	
MF	(Panama) Cristian Martínez	(United States) Chicago Fire	Option declined. Selected by Chicago in the 2018 MLS Waiver Draft.	November 26, 2018	
MF	(United States) Ricardo Clark	(United States) Columbus Crew SC	Option declined	November 26, 2018	

=== Loan out ===
Pos.	Player	Loanee club	Length/Notes	Beginning	End	Source
GK	(United States) Ben Lundgaard	(United States) Indy Eleven	Duration of the 2018 USL season.	March 7, 2018	October 21, 2018	
DF	(United States) Alex Crognale	(United States) Orange County SC	On a match-by-match basis. Columbus retains right to recall at any time.	March 15, 2018	May 5, 2018	
DF	(United States) Alex Crognale	(United States) Orange County SC	On a match-by-match basis. Columbus retains right to recall at any time.	May 22, 2018	June 2, 2018	
DF	(United States) Alex Crognale	(United States) Orange County SC	On a match-by-match basis. Columbus retains right to recall at any time.	June 18, 2018	November 4, 2018	
FW	(Ghana) Edward Opoku	(United States) Saint Louis FC	On a match-by-match basis. Columbus retains right to recall at any time.	April 27, 2018	May 18, 2018	
DF	(United States) Connor Maloney	(United States) Pittsburgh Riverhounds SC	On a match-by-match basis. Columbus retains right to recall at any time.	May 25, 2018	June 30, 2018	
FW	(United States) Adam Jahn	(United States) OKC Energy FC	On a match-by-match basis. Columbus retains right to recall at any time.	July 24, 2018	October 14, 2018	
MF	(Ghana) Mohammed Abu	(Norway) Vålerenga Fotball	Duration of the 2018 Eliteserien.	August 10, 2018	October 4, 2018	

=== MLS Draft picks ===
Draft picks are not automatically signed to the team roster. Only those who are signed to a contract will be listed as transfers in. The picks for Columbus Crew SC are listed below:

2018 Columbus Crew SC SuperDraft Picks
Round	Pick	Player	Position	College
1	21	(United States) Ben Lundgaard	GK	Virginia Tech
2	32	(Ghana) Edward Opoku	FW	Virginia
3	44	(United States) Jake Rozhansky	MF	Maryland
4	67	(United States) Luis Argudo	MF	Wake Forest

== Awards ==
MLS Team of the Week
Week	Starters	Bench	Opponent(s)	Link
1	(Ghana) Lalas Abubakar (Argentina) Federico Higuaín (Argentina) Milton Valenzuela		(Canada) Toronto FC	
2		(United States) Gyasi Zardes	(Canada) Montreal Impact	
4	(United States) Gregg Berhalter (coach) (Argentina) Federico Higuaín (Panama) Cristian Martínez (Argentina) Milton Valenzuela	(Portugal) Pedro Santos	(United States) D.C. United	
9		(United States) Mike Grella	(United States) San Jose Earthquakes	
10	(Ghana) Lalas Abubakar	(Argentina) Milton Valenzuela	(United States) Seattle Sounders FC	
11	(United States) Gregg Berhalter (coach) (United States) Gyasi Zardes	(United States) Zack Steffen	(United States) Philadelphia Union (United States) Chicago Fire	
12	(Ghana) Jonathan Mensah		(United States) New England Revolution	
13	(Brazil) Artur (United States) Josh Williams		(United States) Sporting Kansas City	
14	(Argentina) Federico Higuaín		(Canada) Toronto FC	
15	(Ghana) Harrison Afful		(United States) New York Red Bulls	
18	(Venezuela) Eduardo Sosa		(United States) Real Salt Lake	
21	(United States) Wil Trapp		(United States) Orlando City SC	
22	(Ghana) Harrison Afful	(United States) Patrick Mullins	(United States) New York Red Bulls	
24	(United States) Gyasi Zardes	(Argentina) Federico Higuaín (Argentina) Milton Valenzuela	(United States) Houston Dynamo	
27	(Ghana) Harrison Afful	(Iraq) Justin Meram	(United States) New York City FC	
29	(Ghana) Jonathan Mensah		(United States) FC Dallas	
30	(Argentina) Federico Higuaín	(Denmark) Niko Hansen	(United States) Portland Timbers (United States) Colorado Rapids	
35	(United States) Gyasi Zardes		(United States) Minnesota United FC	

=== MLS Player of the Week ===
Week	Player	Opponent(s)	Link
11	(United States) Gyasi Zardes	Philadelphia Union; Chicago Fire	
35	(United States) Gyasi Zardes	Minnesota United FC	

=== MLS Goal of the Week ===
Week	Player	Opponent	Link
21	(United States) Wil Trapp	Orlando City SC	

=== MLS Player of the Month ===
Month	Player	Stats	Link
May	(United States) Zack Steffen	0 GA in 5 matches	

=== 2018 MLS All-Star Game ===
- GK Zack Steffen

=== Postseason ===
MLS Goalkeeper of the Year Award

- GK Zack Steffen

MLS Comeback Player of the Year Award

- FW Gyasi Zardes

MLS Best XI

- GK Zack Steffen

=== Crew SC Team Awards ===
- Most Valuable Player – Gyasi Zardes
- Golden Boot Winner – Gyasi Zardes
- Defender of the Year – Jonathan Mensah
- Kirk Urso Heart Award – Connor Maloney
- Humanitarian of the Year – Wil Trapp
- Academy Player of the Year – Keegan Hughes

== Kits ==
Home	Away

Type	Shirt	Shorts	Socks	First appearance / Record
Home	Gold	Gold	Gold	Match 1 vs. Toronto / 9–6–7
Away	Black	Black	Black	Match 2 vs. Montreal / 6–6–3
Specialty	White	White	White	Match 8 vs. New England / 0–0–1
