= 2019 MLS Homegrown Game =

- Event: 2019 Major League Soccer season
MLS Homegrowns	Chivas U-20s
(United States) (Canada)	(Mexico)
2	2
- MLS Homegrowns won 3–0 on penalties
- Date: July 30, 2019
- Venue: ESPN Wide World of Sports Complex, Orlando, Florida
- Most Valuable Player: Noble Okello (MLS Homegrowns)
- Referee: Michael Radchuk

The 2019 MLS Homegrown Game (also known as the 2019 MLS Homegrown Game presented by Energizer for sponsorship reasons) was the sixth edition of the Major League Soccer Homegrown Game. It was held on July 30 at the ESPN Wide World of Sports Complex in Orlando, Florida and saw a team of MLS Homegrowns play against Mexican youth team Chivas U-20s. The event is held annually in conjunction with the MLS All-Star Game. In 2019, the Homegrown Game preceded the new MLS All-Star Skills Challenge.

MLS announced a 22-player Homegrown roster on July 10, 2019 with second set announced on July 24 along with three withdrawals. The final roster totaled 24 players from 18 different MLS clubs including two from host team Orlando City SC. Marcelo Neveleff, Orlando City Academy director, was selected as head coach.

== Squads ==
=== MLS Homegrowns ===
No.	Pos.	Player	Date of birth (age)	Club
1	GK	(Mexico) David Ochoa	January 16, 2001 (aged 18)	(United States Soccer Federation) Real Salt Lake
18	GK	(United States) JT Marcinkowski	9 May 1997 (aged 22)	(United States Soccer Federation) San Jose Earthquakes
22	GK	(United States) Mason Stajduhar	December 2, 1997 (aged 21)	(United States Soccer Federation) Orlando City SC
–	GK	(United States) Matt Freese^{a}	2 September 1998 (aged 20)	(United States Soccer Federation) Philadelphia Union
2	DF	(Canada) Clément Bayiha	March 8, 1999 (aged 20)	(Canadian Soccer Association) Montreal Impact
3	DF	(United States) Sam Vines	May 31, 1999 (aged 20)	(United States Soccer Federation) Colorado Rapids
4	DF	(Sweden) Erik McCue	January 18, 2001 (aged 18)	(United States Soccer Federation) Houston Dynamo
5	DF	(United States) Aboubacar Keita	April 6, 2000 (aged 19)	(United States Soccer Federation) Columbus Crew
13	DF	(United States) Andre Reynolds	May 2, 2001 (aged 18)	(United States Soccer Federation) Chicago Fire
16	DF	(United States) George Campbell	June 22, 2001 (aged 18)	(United States Soccer Federation) Atlanta United FC
19	DF	(United States) Bryan Reynolds	June 28, 2001 (aged 18)	(United States Soccer Federation) FC Dallas
–	DF	(Canada) Daniel Kinumbe^{a}	March 15, 1999 (aged 20)	(Canadian Soccer Association) Montreal Impact
–	DF	(United States) Donovan Pines^{a}	March 7, 1998 (aged 21)	(United States Soccer Federation) D.C. United
6	MF	(United States) Edwin Cerrillo	October 3, 2000 (aged 18)	(United States Soccer Federation) FC Dallas
7	MF	(United States) Gianluca Busio	May 28, 2002 (aged 17)	(United States Soccer Federation) Sporting Kansas City
8	MF	(United States) Brandon Servania	March 12, 1999 (aged 20)	(United States Soccer Federation) FC Dallas
10	MF	(United States) Brenden Aaronson	October 22, 2000 (aged 18)	(United States Soccer Federation) Philadelphia Union
12	MF	(United States) Cole Bassett	July 28, 2001 (aged 18)	(United States Soccer Federation) Colorado Rapids
15	MF	(Canada) Noble Okello	July 20, 2000 (aged 19)	(Canadian Soccer Association) Toronto FC
20	MF	(Canada) Mathieu Choinière	February 7, 1999 (aged 20)	(Canadian Soccer Association) Montreal Impact
23	MF	(United States) Thomas Roberts	May 11, 2001 (aged 18)	(United States Soccer Federation) FC Dallas
24	MF	(Mexico) Efraín Álvarez	June 19, 2002 (aged 17)	(United States Soccer Federation) LA Galaxy
9	FW	(United States) Justin Rennicks	March 20, 1999 (aged 20)	(United States Soccer Federation) New England Revolution
11	FW	(Canada) Theo Bair	August 27, 1999 (aged 19)	(Canadian Soccer Association) Vancouver Whitecaps FC
14	FW	(United States) Benji Michel	October 23, 1997 (aged 21)	(United States Soccer Federation) Orlando City SC
17	FW	(Somalia) Handwalla Bwana	June 25, 1997 (aged 22)	(United States Soccer Federation) Seattle Sounders FC
21	FW	(United States) Omir Fernandez	February 8, 1999 (aged 20)	(United States Soccer Federation) New York Red Bulls

Notes:

^{a} Withdrew from squad prior to match.

=== Chivas U-20s ===
Note: Flags indicate national team as defined under FIFA eligibility rules; some limited exceptions apply. Players may hold more than one non-FIFA nationality.

No.	Pos.	Nation	Player
181	GK	MEX	José Rangel
182	DF	MEX	Leopoldo Cortés
183	FW	MEX	Cristian Ortíz
185	DF	MEX	Gilberto Sepúlveda
186	FW	MEX	Deivoon Magaña
187	MF	MEX	Alan Torres
188	FW	MEX	Irving Márquez
189	MF	MEX	Alejandro Organista
190	FW	MEX	Daniel López
192	DF	MEX	Gilberto García
193	MF	MEX	Jossué Córdova
194	MF	MEX	Zahid Muñoz

No.	Pos.	Nation	Player
195	FW	MEX	Benjamín Sánchez
196	FW	MEX	Sebastián Martínez
197	DF	MEX	Rodrigo Reyes
198	FW	MEX	Miguel Guzmán
199	DF	MEX	Walter Ortega
200	DF	MEX	Diego Campillo
202	FW	MEX	Juan Brigido
203	FW	MEX	Irvin Ortíz
204	MF	MEX	Sebastián Fierro
205	MF	MEX	José Solís
206	MF	MEX	Brandon Navarro

== Match ==
July 30, 2019
17:00 ET

MLS Homegrowns (United States) (Canada)	2–2	(Mexico) Chivas U-20s
Fernandez 2'; Okello 90+4'	Report	Márquez 1'; Martínez 70'
Penalties
Vines (penalty scored); Roberts (penalty scored); Bassett (penalty scored)	3–0	(penalty missed) Rangel; (penalty missed) Martínez; (penalty missed) Fierro

ESPN Wide World of Sports Complex, Orlando, Florida

GK	22	(United States) Mason Stajduhar		(substituted off) 32'
DF	2	(Canada) Clément Bayiha		(substituted off) 46'
DF	16	(United States) George Campbell		(substituted off) 46'
DF	5	(United States) Aboubacar Keita		(substituted off) 46'
DF	13	(United States) Andre Reynolds		(substituted off) 46'
MF	24	(Mexico) Efraín Álvarez		(substituted off) 46'
MF	6	(United States) Edwin Cerrillo	(yellow card) 18'	(substituted off) 46'
MF	7	(United States) Gianluca Busio		(substituted off) 46'
FW	14	(United States) Benji Michel		(substituted off) 46'
FW	11	(Canada) Theo Bair		(substituted off) 46'
FW	21	(United States) Omir Fernandez		(substituted off) 32'
Substitutes:
GK	18	(United States) JT Marcinkowski		(substituted on) 61'
GK	1	(Mexico) David Ochoa		(substituted on) 32' (substituted off) 61'
DF	19	(United States) Bryan Reynolds		(substituted on) 46'
DF	3	(United States) Sam Vines		(substituted on) 46'
DF	4	(Sweden) Erik McCue		(substituted on) 46'
MF	15	(Canada) Noble Okello		(substituted on) 46'
MF	8	(United States) Brandon Servania		(substituted on) 46'
MF	12	(United States) Cole Bassett		(substituted on) 46'
MF	20	(Canada) Mathieu Choinière		(substituted on) 61'
MF	23	(United States) Thomas Roberts		(substituted on) 46'
MF	10	(United States) Brenden Aaronson		(substituted on) 46'
FW	9	(United States) Justin Rennicks		(substituted on) 46'
FW	17	(Somalia) Handwalla Bwana		(substituted on) 32' (substituted off) 61'
Manager:
(Argentina) Marcelo Neveleff

GK	181	(Mexico) José Rangel
DF	182	(Mexico) Leopoldo Cortés		(substituted off) 46'
DF	192	(Mexico) Gilberto García		(substituted off) 46'
DF	185	(Mexico) Gilberto Sepúlveda		(substituted off) 46'
DF	183	(Mexico) Cristian Ortíz		(substituted off) 46'
MF	189	(Mexico) Alejandro Organista		(substituted off) 46'
MF	187	(Mexico) Alan Torres		(substituted off) 46'
MF	195	(Mexico) Benjamín Sánchez		(substituted off) 46'
FW	186	(Mexico) Deivoon Magaña		(substituted off) 45+2'
FW	190	(Mexico) Daniel López		(substituted off) 46'
FW	186	(Mexico) Irving Márquez		(substituted off) 46'
Substitutes:
DF	197	(Mexico) Rodrigo Reyes		(substituted on) 46'
DF	199	(Mexico) Walter Ortega		(substituted on) 46'
DF	200	(Mexico) Diego Campillo		(substituted on) 46'
MF	193	(Mexico) Jossué Córdova		(substituted on) 46' (substituted off) 70'
MF	194	(Mexico) Zahid Muñoz
MF	202	(Mexico) Juan Brigido		(substituted on) 46'
MF	204	(Mexico) Sebastián Fierro		(substituted on) 46'
MF	205	(Mexico) José Solís		(substituted on) 46'
MF	206	(Mexico) Brandon Navarro		(substituted on) 70'
FW	196	(Mexico) Sebastián Martínez	(yellow card) 69'	(substituted on) 46'
FW	198	(Mexico) Miguel Guzmán		(substituted on) 45+2'
FW	203	(Mexico) Irvin Ortíz		(substituted on) 46'
Manager:
(Mexico) Alberto Coyote
