= 2015 MLS Homegrown Game =

MLS Homegrown Game 2015
- Event: 2015 Major League Soccer season
MLS Homegrown Players	América U-20
(United States) (Canada)	(Mexico)
1	1
- América U-20 won 5–4 on penalties
- Date: July 28, 2015
- Venue: Dick's Sporting Goods Park, Commerce City, Colorado
- Referee: Alejandro Mariscal (United States)
- Attendance: 8,023

The 2015 MLS Homegrown Game (also known as the 2015 Chipotle MLS Homegrown Game for sponsorship reasons) was the second version of the Major League Soccer Homegrown Game. The match took place between the best selected homegrown players from Major League Soccer at the Club América U-20 on July 28, a day before the 2015 MLS All-Star Game. The venue for the game was Dick's Sporting Goods Park in Commerce City, Colorado.

Landon Donovan served as coach of the MLS squad.
