= 2015 MLS All-Star Game =

Soccer game played in Commerce City, Colorado

2015 AT&T MLS All-Star Game
AT&T All-Star Colorado '15
- Event: 2015 Major League Soccer season
MLS All-Stars	Tottenham Hotspur
(United States) (Canada)	(England)
2	1
- Date: July 29, 2015
- Venue: Dick's Sporting Goods Park, Commerce City, Colorado
- Most Valuable Player: Kaká (MLS All-Stars)
- Referee: Ismail Elfath (United States)
- Attendance: 18,671

The 2015 Major League Soccer All-Star Game, the 20th annual Major League Soccer All-Star Game, took place on July 29, 2015 (9 p.m. EDT, 7 p.m. local time) at Dick's Sporting Goods Park in the Denver suburb of Commerce City, Colorado, the home of the Colorado Rapids. The game was televised live on Fox Sports 1 and UniMás in the United States, and TSN and RDS in Canada.

Kaká was named MVP. Also, 2015 MLS Homegrown Game was played one day before this event.

== Squads ==
=== MLS All-Stars ===
As of July 29, 2015 Note: Flags indicate national team as defined under FIFA eligibility rules; some limited exceptions apply. Players may hold more than one non-FIFA nationality.

No.	Pos.	Nation	Player
1	GK	DEN	David Ousted (Vancouver Whitecaps FC)^{[b]}
2	FW	USA	Clint Dempsey (Seattle Sounders FC)^{[a]}
3	DF	USA	Drew Moor (Colorado Rapids)^{[b]}
4	DF	USA	Omar Gonzalez (LA Galaxy)^{[a]}
5	DF	USA	Matt Besler (Sporting Kansas City)^{[a]}
6	DF	BEL	Laurent Ciman (Montreal Impact)^{[b]}
7	FW	ESP	David Villa (New York City FC)^{[a]}
8	MF	USA	Ethan Finlay (Columbus Crew SC)^{[e]}
9	MF	BRA	Juninho (LA Galaxy)^{[e]}
10	FW	USA	Jozy Altidore (Toronto FC)^{[e]}
11	MF	COL	Fabián Castillo (FC Dallas)^{[b]}
12	DF	USA	Tony Beltran (Real Salt Lake)^{[b]}
13	MF	USA	Dax McCarty (New York Red Bulls)^{[c]}
14	DF	USA	Chad Marshall (Seattle Sounders FC)^{[b]}
16	DF	USA	DaMarcus Beasley (Houston Dynamo)^{[a]}
17	MF	USA	Benny Feilhaber (Sporting Kansas City)^{[a]}

No.	Pos.	Nation	Player
18	GK	USA	Nick Rimando (Real Salt Lake)^{[a]}
19	MF	USA	Graham Zusi (Sporting Kansas City)^{[a]}
20	DF	CRC	Waylon Francis (Columbus Crew SC)^{[e]}
21	MF	USA	Sam Cronin (Colorado Rapids)^{[e]}
22	MF	BRA	Kaká (Orlando City SC)^{[a]}^{[e]}
23	FW	SLE	Kei Kamara (Columbus Crew)^{[b]}
30	FW	USA	Gyasi Zardes (LA Galaxy)^{[e]}
31	GK	USA	Clint Irwin (Colorado Rapids)^{[e]}
—	DF	USA	Chris Tierney (New England Revolution)^{[b]}^{[d]}
—	MF	USA	Michael Bradley (Toronto FC)^{[a]}^{[d]}
—	MF	ENG	Steven Gerrard (LA Galaxy)^{[c]}^{[d]}
—	MF	ENG	Frank Lampard (New York City FC)^{[c]}^{[d]}
—	FW	NGR	Obafemi Martins (Seattle Sounders FC)^{[a]}^{[d]}
—	FW	IRL	Robbie Keane (LA Galaxy)^{[b]}^{[d]}
—	FW	ITA	Sebastian Giovinco (Toronto FC)^{[b]}^{[d]}

Notes:

^{a} 2015 MLS All-Star Fan XI.
^{b} Selected by All-Star coach Pablo Mastroeni of the Colorado Rapids.
^{c} Selected by MLS Commissioner Don Garber
^{d} Injured or otherwise unable to play.
^{e} Replacement for player who is injured or otherwise unable to play.

==== Selection controversy ====
The league commissioner Don Garber used his two picks to select two players who had never played a single minute in MLS at the time of selection in the two former England internationals Steven Gerrard and Frank Lampard who had only officially joined the league on July 8. This provoked outrage from fans, the media and other players, the league eventually agreed to select two extra players to be given all-star bonuses.

The league's top scorer, Kei Kamara, was omitted from the Fan XI and responded by saying "It's simple as it goes: you're either a U.S. national team player or you're a DP to be on there. I'm neither one of those. If I get called up, I'll be lucky." The top 10 in the fan vote included 8 players who have represented the US national team alongside Kaká and David Villa with Nigerian international Obafemi Martins also being selected via virtual performances in FIFA 15.

=== Tottenham Hotspur ===
On July 27 Tottenham Hotspur announced a 25-man traveling squad for the MLS All-Star game:

Note: Flags indicate national team as defined under FIFA eligibility rules; some limited exceptions apply. Players may hold more than one non-FIFA nationality.

No.	Pos.	Nation	Player
1	GK	FRA	Hugo Lloris ^{[a]}
2	DF	ENG	Kyle Walker
3	DF	ENG	Danny Rose
4	DF	BEL	Toby Alderweireld
5	DF	BEL	Jan Vertonghen
11	MF	ARG	Erik Lamela ^{[a]}
12	DF	USA	DeAndre Yedlin
13	GK	NED	Michel Vorm
15	DF	ENG	Eric Dier
16	DF	ENG	Kieran Trippier
18	FW	ENG	Harry Kane
19	MF	BEL	Mousa Dembélé
20	MF	ENG	Dele Alli

No.	Pos.	Nation	Player
21	DF	ARG	Federico Fazio
22	MF	BEL	Nacer Chadli
23	MF	DEN	Christian Eriksen
27	DF	AUT	Kevin Wimmer
28	MF	ENG	Tom Carroll
33	DF	WAL	Ben Davies
42	MF	ALG	Nabil Bentaleb
44	MF	ENG	Harry Winks ^{[b]}
46	FW	ENG	Shaq Coulthirst ^{[b]}
47	MF	ENG	Josh Onomah ^{[b]}
48	GK	ENG	Luke McGee ^{[b]}
50	GK	AUS	Tom Glover ^{[c]}

Notes:

^{a} Injured or unable to play.
^{b} Development Squad
^{c} Second Year Academy

== Match details ==
July 29, 2015
7:00 p.m. MDT

MLS All-Stars (United States) (Canada)	2–1	(England) Tottenham Hotspur
Kaká 20' (pen.); Villa 23'	Report	Kane 37'

Dick's Sporting Goods Park, Commerce City, Colorado
Attendance: 18,671
Referee: Ismail Elfath (United States)

MLS All-Stars	Tottenham Hotspur

GK	18	(United States) Nick Rimando	(substituted off) 45'
RB	12	(United States) Tony Beltran	(substituted off) 45'
CB	4	(United States) Omar Gonzalez	(substituted off) 45'
CB	5	(United States) Matt Besler	(substituted off) 45'
LB	16	(United States) DaMarcus Beasley	(substituted off) 45'
CM	19	(United States) Graham Zusi	(substituted off) 45'
CM	13	(United States) Dax McCarty	(substituted off) 45'
CM	2	(United States) Clint Dempsey	(substituted off) 45'
AM	22	(Brazil) Kaká (c)	(substituted off) 45'
CF	30	(United States) Gyasi Zardes	(substituted off) 45'
CF	7	(Spain) David Villa	(substituted off) 45'
Substitutes:
GK	1	(Denmark) David Ousted	(substituted on) 45'
GK	31	(United States) Clint Irwin
DF	14	(United States) Chad Marshall	(substituted on) 45'
DF	3	(United States) Drew Moor	(substituted on) 45'
DF	6	(Belgium) Laurent Ciman	(substituted on) 45'
DF	20	(Costa Rica) Waylon Francis	(substituted on) 45'
MF	17	(United States) Benny Feilhaber	(substituted on) 45'
MF	10	(United States) Jozy Altidore		(substituted on) 77'
MF	9	(Brazil) Juninho	(substituted on) 45'
MF	11	(Colombia) Fabian Castillo	(substituted on) 45'
MF	8	(United States) Ethan Finlay	(substituted on) 45'
FW	23	(Sierra Leone) Kei Kamara	(substituted on) 45'
FW	21	(Italy) Sebastian Giovinco	(substituted on) 45'	(substituted off) 77'
Manager:
(United States) Pablo Mastroeni

GK	13	(Netherlands) Michel Vorm	(substituted off) 64'
CB	5	(Belgium) Jan Vertonghen (c)	(substituted off) 45'
CB	4	(Belgium) Toby Alderweireld	(substituted off) 64'
CB	33	(Wales) Ben Davies	(substituted off) 63'
RM	2	(England) Kyle Walker	(substituted off) 45'
CM	15	(England) Eric Dier	(substituted off) 64'
CM	42	(Algeria) Nabil Bentaleb	(substituted off) 45'
LM	22	(Belgium) Nacer Chadli	(substituted off) 64'
AM	23	(Denmark) Christian Eriksen	(substituted off) 45'
AM	19	(Belgium) Mousa Dembélé	(substituted off) 64'
CF	18	(England) Harry Kane	(substituted off) 77'
Substitutes:
GK	48	(England) Luke McGee	(substituted on) 64'
GK	50	(Australia) Tom Glover
DF	3	(England) Danny Rose	(substituted on) 63'
DF	12	(United States) DeAndre Yedlin	(substituted on) 64'
DF	16	(England) Kieran Trippier	(substituted on) 45'
DF	21	(Argentina) Federico Fazio	(substituted on) 64'
DF	27	(Austria) Kevin Wimmer	(substituted on) 45'
DF	28	(England) Tom Carroll	(substituted on) 45'
DF	47	(England) Josh Onomah	(substituted on) 64'
MF	20	(England) Dele Alli	(substituted on) 45'
MF	44	(England) Harry Winks	(substituted on) 64'
FW	46	(England) Shaq Coulthirst	(substituted on) 64'
Manager:
(Argentina) Mauricio Pochettino

MLS All-Star Game MVP:
(Brazil) Kaká (MLS All-Stars)
Assistant referees:
Jeff Muschik
Brian Dunn
Fourth official:
Sorin Stoica
Fifth official:
Michael Rottersman

Match rules

- 90 minutes.
- Unlimited substitutions.
- No extra time.
- Penalty shoot-out if scores still level.
