= 2018 Carolina Challenge Cup =

Tournament details
- Host country: United States
- Dates: February 17–24
- Teams: 4 (from 1 confederation)
- Venue(s): 1 (in 1 host city)

Final positions
- Champions: Columbus Crew (3rd title)
- Runners-up: Charleston Battery
- Third place: Atlanta United
- Fourth place: Minnesota United

Tournament statistics
- Matches played: 6
- Goals scored: 12 (2 per match)
- Top scorer(s): Gyasi Zardes (3 goals)

The 2018 Carolina Challenge Cup was the 14th edition of the Carolina Challenge Cup, an annual soccer tournament held in Charleston, South Carolina by the Charleston Battery. The tournament ran from February 17 to 24, with all matches played at MUSC Health Stadium in Charleston.

In addition to the Charleston Battery of the United Soccer League (USL), three Major League Soccer (MLS) clubs participated: Columbus Crew SC and 2017 expansion franchises Atlanta United FC and Minnesota United FC.

== Teams ==
Team	League	Appearance
(United States) Atlanta United	MLS	2nd
(United States) Charleston Battery (hosts)	USL	14th
(United States) Columbus Crew	MLS	5th
(United States) Minnesota United	MLS	1st

== Standings ==
Team	Pld	W	D	L	GF	GA	GD	Pts
Columbus Crew	3	3	0	0	7	2	+5	9
Charleston Battery	3	1	1	1	2	2	0	4
Atlanta United	3	0	2	1	2	4	-2	2
Minnesota United	3	0	1	2	1	4	-3	1

== Matches ==
February 17 Friendly	Atlanta United	1–3	Columbus Crew	Charleston, South Carolina
17:00 EST (UTC−05:00)	Almirón 90'		Pedro Santos 13'; C. Martínez 34'; J. Martínez 71' (o.g.)	Stadium: MUSC Health Stadium

February 17 Friendly	Charleston Battery	1–0	Minnesota United	Charleston, South Carolina
19:30 EST (UTC−05:00)	Svantesson 45+1'			Stadium: MUSC Health Stadium

February 21 Friendly	Charleston Battery	1−2	Columbus Crew	Charleston, South Carolina
17:00 EST (UTC−05:00)	Svantesson 32'		Zardes 56', 82'	Stadium: MUSC Health Stadium

February 21 Friendly	Atlanta United	1−1	Minnesota United	Charleston, South Carolina
19:30 EST (UTC−05:00)	Barco 85'		Molino 52' (pen.)	Stadium: MUSC Health Stadium

February 24 Friendly	Columbus Crew	2−0	Minnesota United	Charleston, South Carolina
17:00 EST (UTC−05:00)	Higuaín 32'; Zardes 37'			Stadium: MUSC Health Stadium

February 24 Friendly	Charleston Battery	0−0	Atlanta United	Charleston, South Carolina
19:30 EST (UTC−05:00)				Stadium: MUSC Health Stadium

== See also ==
- Carolina Challenge Cup
- Charleston Battery
- 2018 in American soccer
