= Thomas Roberts (soccer) =

American soccer player (born 2001)

Personal information
- Full name: Charles Thomas Roberts
- Date of birth: May 11, 2001 (age 25)
- Place of birth: Little Rock, Arkansas, United States
- Height: 5 ft 11 in (1.80 m)
- Position: Midfielder

Team information
- Current team: Sporting JAX
- Number: 24

Youth career
- 2013–2018: FC Dallas

Senior career*
Years	Team	Apps	(Gls)
2018–2022	FC Dallas	6	(0)
2019–2022	→ North Texas SC	22	(3)
2021–2022	→ Austria Klagenfurt (loan)	8	(0)
2023	Columbus Crew 2	16	(1)
2024–2025	Stabæk	27	(3)
2025	North Carolina FC	12	(1)
2026–	Sporting JAX	16	(0)

International career^{‡}
2017	United States U16	2	(0)
2018	United States U18	4	(1)
2020	United States U20	2	(0)
- * Club domestic league appearances and goals as of October 31, 2026 ‡ National team caps and goals as of August 16, 2020

Thomas Roberts (born May 11, 2001) is an American professional soccer player who plays as a midfielder for Sporting JAX of USL Championship.

== Career ==
Roberts grew up in Little Rock, Arkansas before moving to Dallas in 2013. After five years playing with the FC Dallas Academy, Roberts signed a Homegrown Player contract with Major League Soccer side FC Dallas on July 25, 2018.

On July 6, 2021, Roberts joined Austrian Bundesliga side Austria Klagenfurt on a season-long loan.

Following the 2022 season, his contract option was declined by Dallas.

On March 24, 2023, Roberts signed with MLS Next Pro side Columbus Crew 2.

In August 2025, Roberts joined USL Championship club North Carolina FC for the remainder of the season, with an option for the following season.

On March 13, 2026, USL Championship expansion franchise Sporting JAX announced the addition of Roberts to their inaugural roster.

== Career statistics ==
=== Club ===
As of 16 August 2024

Appearances and goals by club, season and competition
Club	Season	League			National Cup		Other		Total	
Club	Season	Division	Apps	Goals	Apps	Goals	Apps	Goals	Apps	Goals
FC Dallas	2019	MLS	6	0	1	0	1 (Note: Appearance in 2019 MLS Homegrown Game)	0	8	0
FC Dallas	2020	MLS	0	0	—		—		0	0
FC Dallas	2021	MLS	0	0	—		—		0	0
FC Dallas	2022	MLS	0	0	1	0	—		1	0
FC Dallas	Total		6	0	2	0	1	0	9	0
North Texas SC (loan)	2019	USL League One	13	2	—		—		13	2
North Texas SC (loan)	2020	USL League One	10	1	—		—		10	1
North Texas SC (loan)	2022	MLS Next Pro	1	0	—		—		1	0
North Texas SC (loan)	Total		24	3	—		—		24	3
Austria Klagenfurt (loan)	2021-22	Austrian Bundesliga	8	0	3	0	—		11	0
Columbus Crew 2	2023	MLS Next Pro	16	1	—		—		16	1
Columbus Crew	2023	MLS	0	0	2	0	—		2	0
Stabæk	2024	1. divisjon	18	3	2	0	—		20	3
Career Total			72	7	9	0	1	0	82	7
