= Gyasi Zardes =

American soccer player (born 1991)

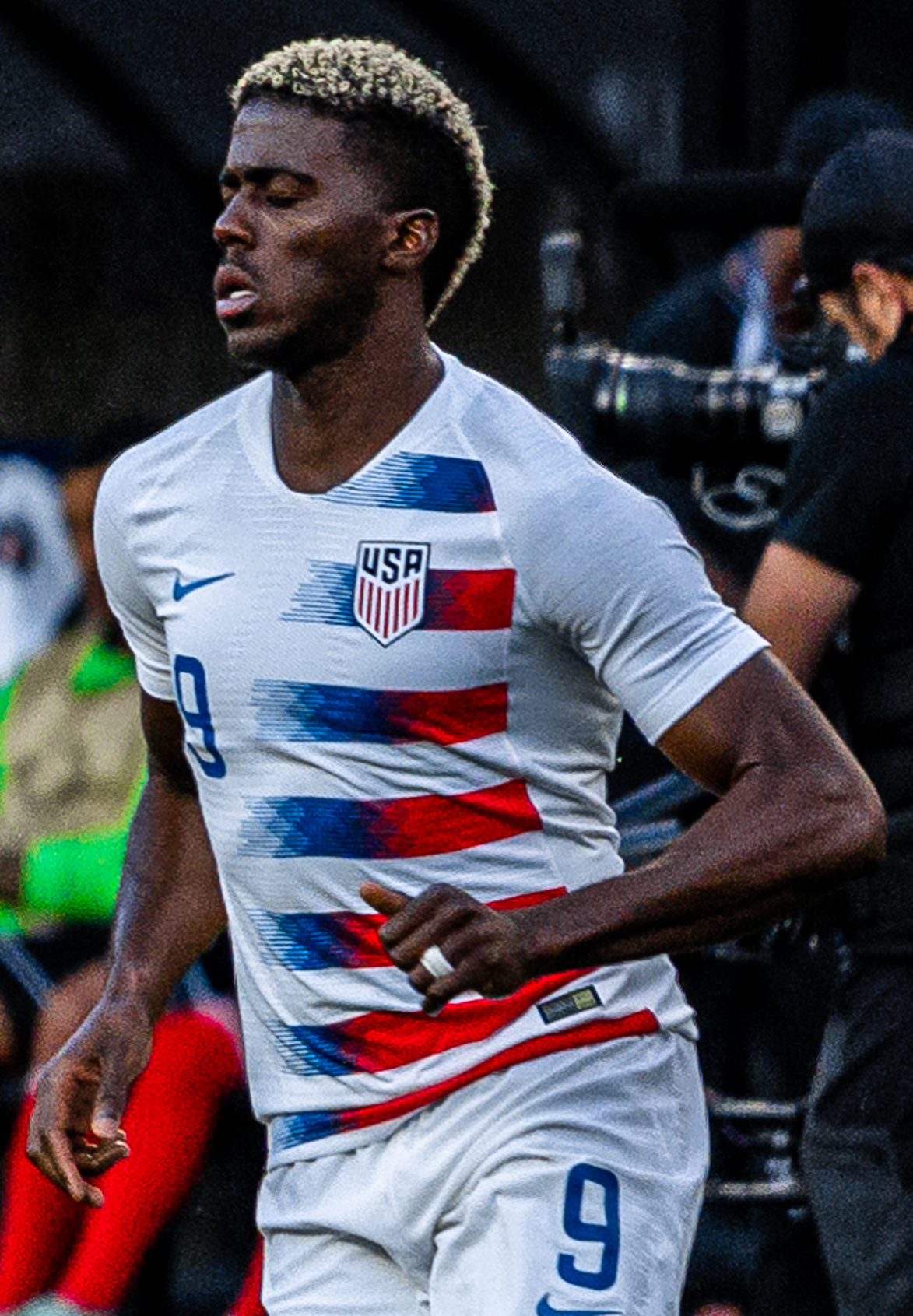
- Zardes with the United States at the 2019 CONCACAF Gold Cup

Personal information
- Full name: Gyasi A. Zardes
- Date of birth: September 2, 1991 (age 35)
- Place of birth: Hawthorne, California, United States
- Height: 6 ft 2 in (1.88 m)
- Position: Forward

Youth career
- 2008–2009: LA Galaxy

College career
Years	Team	Apps	(Gls)
2009–2012	Cal State Bakersfield	56	(38)

Senior career*
Years	Team	Apps	(Gls)
2011–2012	Ventura County Fusion	12	(10)
2013–2017	LA Galaxy	131	(34)
2014	LA Galaxy II	1	(1)
2018–2022	Columbus Crew	110	(54)
2022	Colorado Rapids	26	(9)
2022	Colorado Rapids 2	2	(1)
2023–2024	Austin FC	61	(9)
Total		343	(118)

International career^{‡}
2015–2022	United States	68	(14)
Medal record
Men's soccer
Representing United States
CONCACAF Gold Cup
Winner	2017 United States
Winner	2021 United States
Runner-up	2019 North America
CONCACAF Cup
Runner-up	2015 United States
- * Club domestic league appearances and goals as of 03:15, October 20, 2024 (UTC) ‡ National team caps and goals as of January 30, 2022

Gyasi A. Zardes (born September 2, 1991) is an American former professional soccer player who played as a forward.

Born in Hawthorne, California, Zardes was part of the LA Galaxy youth academy before playing college soccer for Cal State Bakersfield. After playing three seasons with the Roadrunners, Zardes signed for the LA Galaxy as a homegrown player. In his first season, he immediately established himself as a regular in Bruce Arena's squad, and the next season he scored 16 goals as he helped the Galaxy win MLS Cup 2014. His performance for the Galaxy in 2014 helped earn Zardes his debut for the United States against Chile in January 2015.

Prior to the 2018 season, Zardes was traded to the Columbus Crew. He was an immediate starter for head coach Gregg Berhalter as he scored 19 goals in his first season with the Crew. Zardes would be named the MLS Comeback Player of the Year Award for 2018. In 2020, Zardes helped lead the Columbus Crew to their second MLS Cup, defeating Seattle Sounders FC in the final.

== Early life ==
Zardes was born and raised in Hawthorne, California, a suburb of south western Los Angeles. He was one of five children; his father Glenn is from New Orleans, while his mother Linda is from Michigan. In 2016, the City of Hawthorne unveiled a mural of Zardes at its new futsal courts, where a prohibition on soccer use was lifted.

== Club career ==
=== Early career ===
Zardes played in the U.S. Soccer Development Academy for the Galaxy Academy U-18s during the 2008–09 and 2009–10 DA seasons as well as with the Galaxy U-20s in the 2009 USL Super-20 campaign. After declaring himself a red shirt freshman at CSU Bakersfield, Zardes led the Galaxy U-20 team to the national championship in 2010.

After tallying five goals and a team-best seven assists in his first season of college soccer, Zardes burst onto the scene as a sophomore in 2011, scoring 18 times in 20 games while helping lead Bakersfield to a berth in the NCAA Division I Tournament for the first time in school history. His 18 goals that season were the fourth most in Division I college soccer that year and he was selected the Mountain Pacific Sports Federation Player of the Year and a semifinalist for the MAC Hermann Trophy, which is awarded annually to the top player in college soccer.

In 2012, Zardes followed up his breakout season by scoring 15 goals and adding nine assists, each of which were team-highs, in 17 games, while helping the Roadrunners record a winning record for the fourth consecutive season. He had two or more goals in four of his 17 games, including seven goals in a two-game stretch in mid-October.

=== LA Galaxy ===
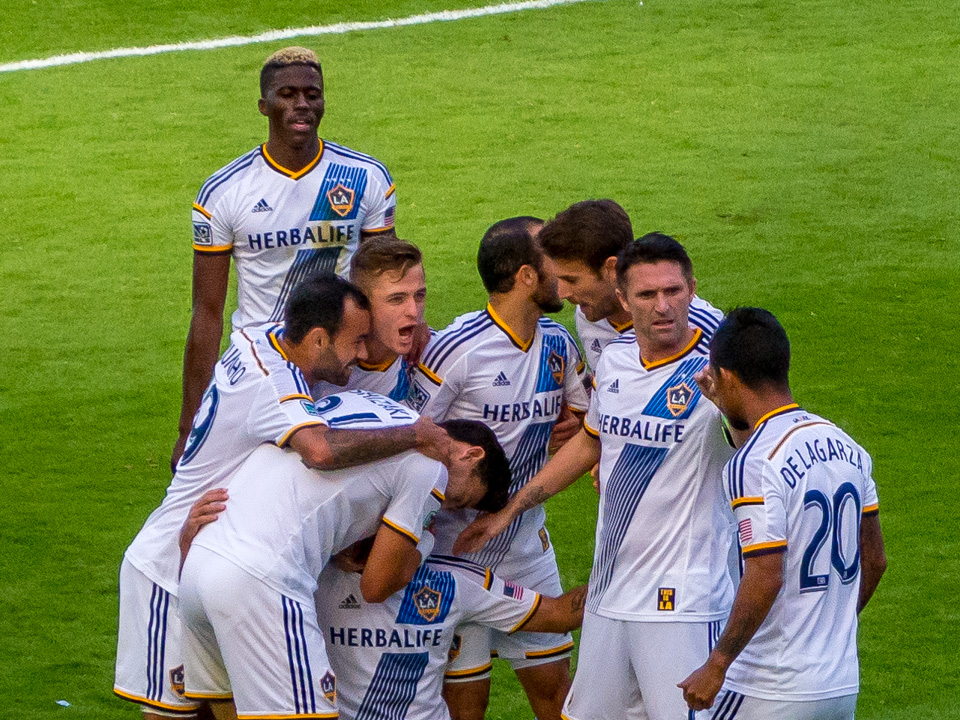
Zardes with LA Galaxy

LA Galaxy signed Zardes as a Homegrown Player on December 20, 2012. On April 15, 2013, Zardes made his debut as a substitute for LA Galaxy Reserves in a 1–1 draw with Seattle Sounders Reserves. On April 27, 2013, Zardes made his debut for the first-team as a substitute for the Galaxy in a 2–0 win over Real Salt Lake. On May 11, 2013, Zardes came on as a substitute in 67th min and scored his first goal for the Galaxy in a 3–1 loss against Vancouver Whitecaps FC. Zardes scored the only goal in a 1–0 victory over Chivas USA on June 23, 2013.

Zardes scored his first brace for the Galaxy against New England Revolution on July 16, 2014, in a 5–1 win. On September 5, 2014, Gyasi Zardes scored two goals in the Galaxy's 6–0 home win against Colorado Rapids. With his brace, Zardes made Major League Soccer history, passing Diego Fagúndez to become the highest scoring Homegrown Player in a single season.

On December 7, 2014, Zardes became the first Homegrown Player to score in the MLS Cup final. Zardes scored in the 53rd minute after receiving a cross from Stefan Ishizaki. In extra time, captain, Robbie Keane scored as Galaxy triumphs the New England Revolution 2–1, making LA Galaxy the first team to win the trophy five times. Zardes was the sixth highest scorer of the season with 16 goals, and just three behind Robbie Keane.

=== Columbus Crew ===
On January 20, 2018, Zardes signed for the Columbus Crew in a swap deal that saw Ola Kamara head in the opposite direction. After an injury plagued end to his Galaxy career, which included a position change to right-back, Zardes found new life in Columbus; scoring 11 goals in the first 19 games of the season. Zardes ended the 2018 season with 19 goals, earning the 2018 MLS Comeback Player of the Year Award. On May 13, 2019, Zardes signed a multi-year contract extension with the Crew and was named a designated player. He would go on to tally 13 goals in 28 appearances during the 2019 season.

=== Colorado Rapids ===
On April 22, 2022, Zardes was traded to the Colorado Rapids in exchange for $300,000 in GAM with potential add-ons that could take the deal up to $1,400,000 GAM in total.

=== Austin FC ===
On December 12, 2022, Zardes signed a three-year contract on free agency deal with Austin FC starting from the 2023 season. Zardes scored a brace against New York City FC on July 6, 2024 at Q2 Stadium, taking him into the Top-10 all-time leading scorers in MLS with 105 career goals. On December 9, 2024, Austin FC opted to buyout Zardes' contract ahead of the 2025 season.

== International career ==
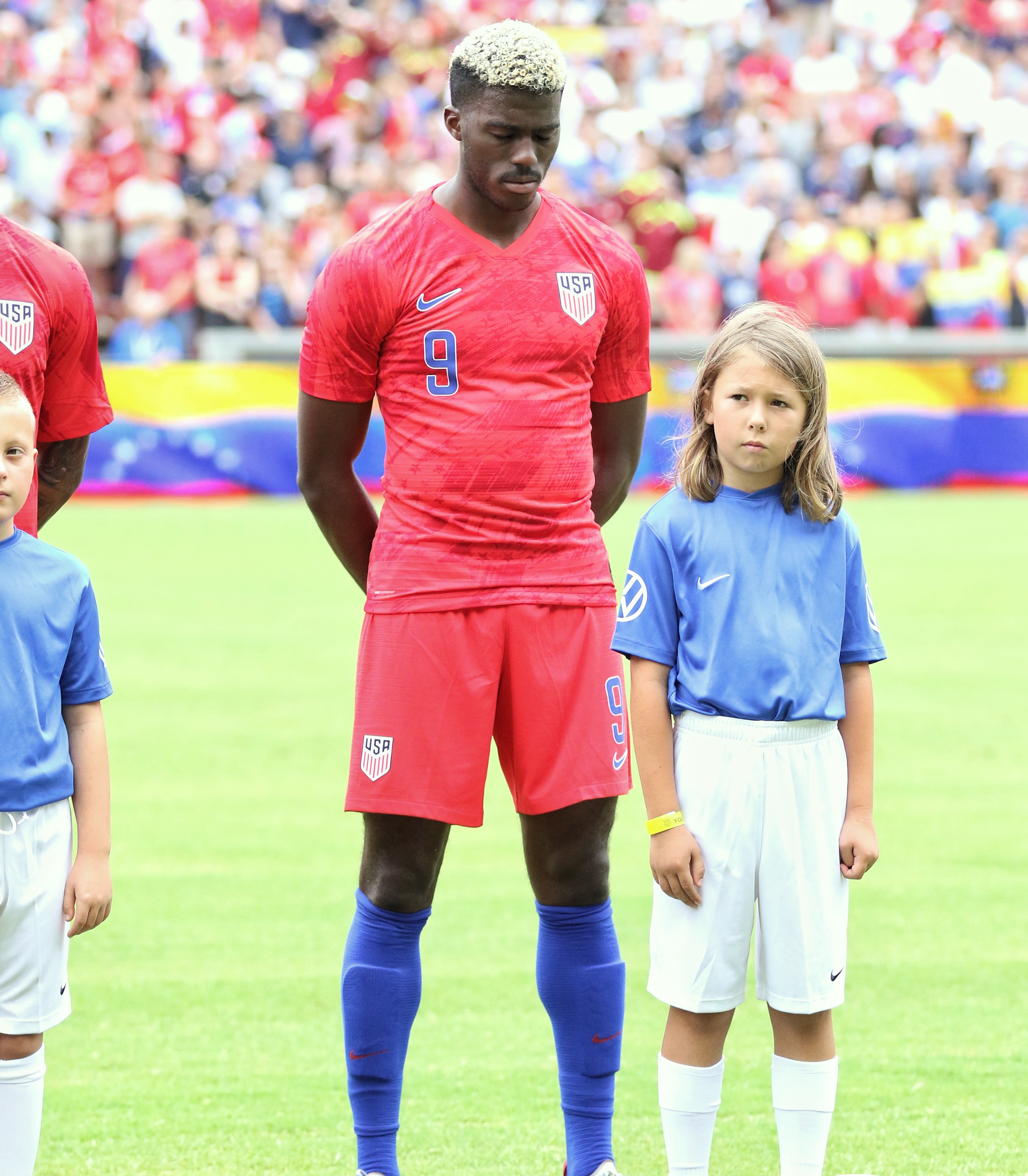
Gyasi Zardes representing the United States on June 9, 2019

After a breakout 2014 season in which he scored 19 goals across all competitions, he received his first ever international call up to represent the United States in January 2015, for matches against Chile and Panama. Zardes made his international debut on January 28, 2015, when he came on as a substitute for Clint Dempsey in the 68th minute against Chile. On February 8, 2015, Zardes made his first start for USMNT in a friendly against Panama, where he provided an assist to Dempsey in the second goal as the U.S. won 2–0.

On June 5, 2015, Zardes scored his first goal for the United States in a friendly against the Netherlands. Zardes was named to the 2015 CONCACAF Gold Cup roster and started in several matches, including a group stage fixture against Haiti where he provided the game-winning assist to Clint Dempsey one minute after coming on as a substitute at halftime. He scored his first international competitive goal on July 18, 2015, in the Gold Cup quarterfinals against Cuba that ended in a 6–0 victory for the United States.

Zardes was called up in the early stages of 2018 FIFA World Cup qualification for the U.S. and scored the fifth goal in a 6–1 victory over Saint Vincent and the Grenadines on November 13, 2015. He had been involved in conceding the first goal of the match to Saint Vincent and the Grenadines after a defensive error. Zardes was named to the U.S. roster for the 2016 Copa América Centenario and scored twice in a warm-up friendly against Bolivia on May 28. He scored the winning goal in the 2–1 quarterfinal match defeat of Ecuador in Seattle, finishing a shot by Clint Dempsey that was rolling towards the goal.

Zardes played in the 2017 CONCACAF Gold Cup and did not score in the tournament, instead providing an assist to Jordan Morris in a narrow 3–2 victory over Martinique in the group stage. His next international goal would come three years later in a friendly against Ecuador on March 21, 2019, which was won 1–0 by the United States. Zardes joined the U.S. in the 2019 CONCACAF Gold Cup and scored the third of four goals in the team's opening group stage match against Guyana. A shot by Paul Arriola was deflected by a Guyanese defender, hitting Zardes in his left eye before bouncing into the goal. In the next match against Trinidad and Tobago, Zardes scored twice in three minutes while the team reached the knockout stage with a 6–0 victory. Zardes was unable to complete his hat-trick, despite having several chances to do so, including a shot that hit the post.

Zardes scored the game winner in the semifinal match against Qatar in the 2021 CONCACAF Gold Cup in the 86th minute of play off of a cross from Nicholas Gioacchini.

== Personal life ==
Zardes is of Ghanaian descent. In 2013, Zardes married his long-term girlfriend Madison Goodvin, a fellow student-athlete, in Bakersfield. They have four children. He is a practicing Christian and has a degree in criminal justice from Cal State Dominguez Hills.

== Career statistics ==
=== Club ===
As of match played October 19, 2024

Appearances and goals by club, season and competition
Club	Season	League			U.S. Open Cup		CONCACAF		Other		Total	
Club	Season	Division	Apps	Goals	Apps	Goals	Apps	Goals	Apps	Goals	Apps	Goals
LA Galaxy	2013	MLS	27	4	1	0	3	0	2 (Note: Appearance(s) in MLS Cup playoffs)	0	33	4
LA Galaxy	2014	MLS	32	16	2	2	2	0	5	1	41	19
LA Galaxy	2015	MLS	29	6	1	1	2	1	1	1	33	9
LA Galaxy	2016	MLS	19	6	2	0	2	0	0	0	23	6
LA Galaxy	2017	MLS	24	2	0	0	—		—		24	2
LA Galaxy	Total		131	34	6	3	9	1	8	2	154	40
LA Galaxy II	2014	USL Pro	1	1	—		—		—		1	1
Columbus Crew	2018	MLS	33	19	0	0	—		3	1	36	20
Columbus Crew	2019	MLS	28	13	0	0	—		—		28	13
Columbus Crew	2020	MLS	21 (Note: Includes three appearances and three goals in MLS is Back Tournament group stage)	12	—		—		5 (Note: One appearance and one goal in MLS is Back Tournament knockout stage, four appearances and two goals in MLS Cup playoffs)	3	26	15
Columbus Crew	2021	MLS	21	9	—		3	2	—		24	11
Columbus Crew	2022	MLS	7	1	1	1	—		—		8	2
Columbus Crew	Total		110	54	1	1	3	2	8	4	122	61
Colorado Rapids	2022	MLS	26	9	—		—		—		26	9
Colorado Rapids 2	2022	MLS Next Pro	2	1	—		—		—		2	1
Austin FC	2023	MLS	28	6	1	0	1	0	1 (Note: Appearance(s) in Leagues Cup)	0	31	6
Austin FC	2024	MLS	33	3	—		—		3	1	36	4
Austin FC	Total		61	9	1	0	1	0	4	1	67	10
Career total			331	108	8	4	13	3	20	7	372	122

=== International ===
As of match played January 30, 2022

Appearances and goals by national team and year
National team	Year	Apps	Goals
United States	2015	19	3
United States	2016	12	3
United States	2017	6	0
United States	2018	3	0
United States	2019	15	6
United States	2020	1	0
United States	2021	10	2
United States	2022	2	0
Total		68	14

Scores and results list the United States' goal tally first.

List of international goals scored by Gyasi Zardes
No.	Date	Venue	Opponent	Score	Result	Competition
1	June 5, 2015	Amsterdam Arena, Amsterdam-Zuidoost, Netherlands	Netherlands	1–1	4–3	Friendly
2	July 18, 2015	M&T Bank Stadium, Baltimore, United States	Cuba	2–0	6–0	2015 CONCACAF Gold Cup
3	November 13, 2015	Busch Stadium, St. Louis, United States	Saint Vincent and the Grenadines	5–1	6–1	2018 FIFA World Cup qualification
4	May 28, 2016	Children's Mercy Park, Kansas City, United States	Bolivia	1–0	4–0	Friendly
5	May 28, 2016	Children's Mercy Park, Kansas City, United States	Bolivia	3–0	4–0	Friendly
6	June 16, 2016	CenturyLink Field, Seattle, United States	Ecuador	2–0	2–1	Copa América Centenario
7	March 21, 2019	Orlando City Stadium, Orlando, United States	Ecuador	1–0	1–0	Friendly
8	June 18, 2019	Allianz Field, Saint Paul, United States	Guyana	3–0	4–0	2019 CONCACAF Gold Cup
9	June 22, 2019	FirstEnergy Stadium, Cleveland, United States	Trinidad and Tobago	2–0	6–0	2019 CONCACAF Gold Cup
10	June 22, 2019	FirstEnergy Stadium, Cleveland, United States	Trinidad and Tobago	3–0	6–0	2019 CONCACAF Gold Cup
11	November 15, 2019	Exploria Stadium, Orlando, United States	Canada	2–0	4–1	2019–20 CONCACAF Nations League A
12	November 15, 2019	Exploria Stadium, Orlando, United States	Canada	4–1	4–1	2019–20 CONCACAF Nations League A
13	July 15, 2021	Children's Mercy Park, Kansas City, United States	Martinique	5–1	6–1	2021 CONCACAF Gold Cup
14	July 29, 2021	Q2 Stadium, Austin, United States	Qatar	1–0	1–0	2021 CONCACAF Gold Cup

== Honors ==
Ventura County Fusion

- USL PDL Southwest Division: 2012

LA Galaxy

- MLS Cup: 2014
- Western Conference Playoffs: 2014

Columbus Crew

- MLS Cup: 2020
- Eastern Conference Playoffs: 2020
- Campeones Cup: 2021

United States

- CONCACAF Gold Cup: 2017, 2021

Individual

- Mountain Pacific Sports Federation Player of the Year: 2011
- MLS Fair Play Award: 2013 (With LA Galaxy)
- MLS All-Star: 2015
- MLS Comeback Player of the Year Award: 2018
- MLS 100 Goals club
