= Aboubacar Keita =

American soccer player

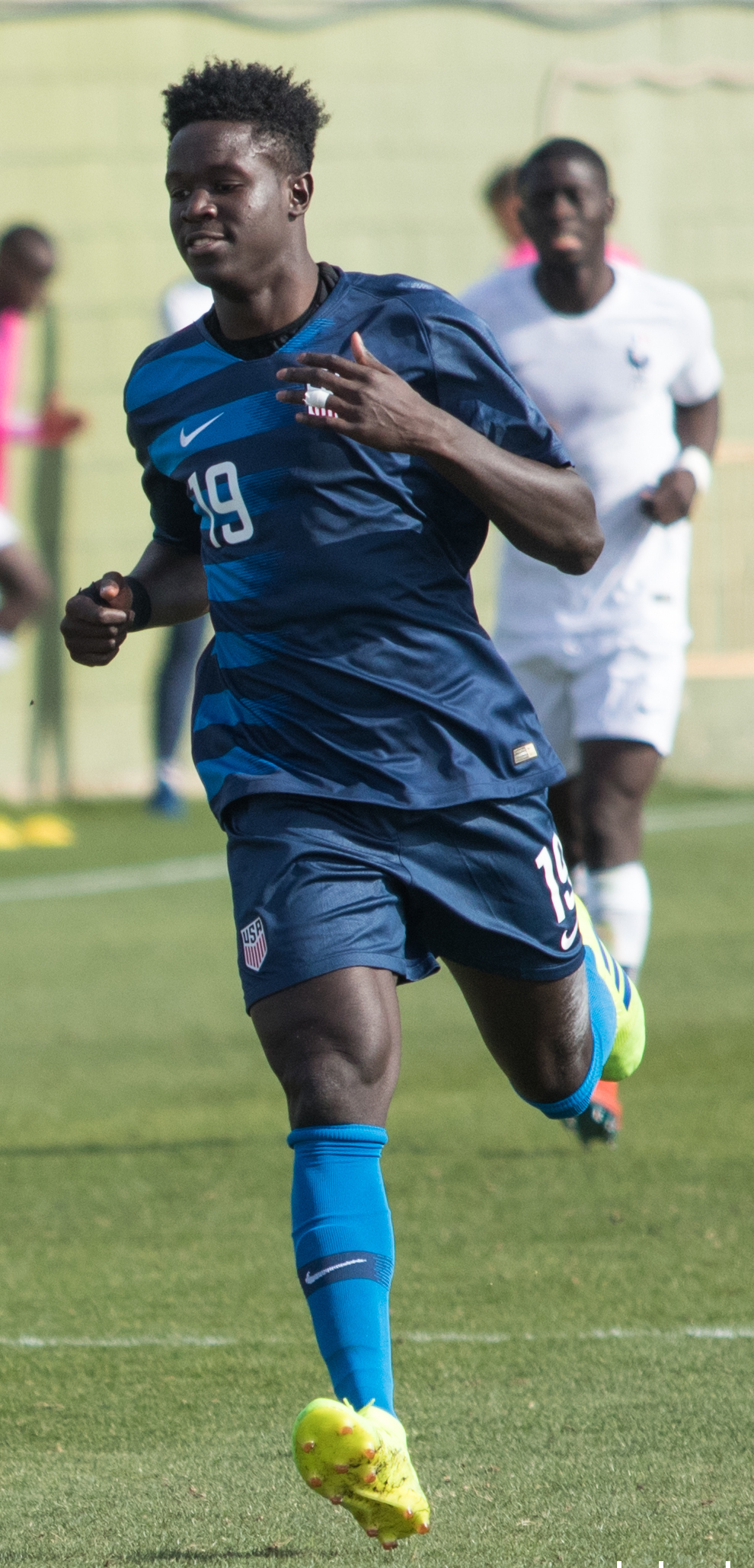
- Keita with the United States U20 in 2019

Personal information
- Full name: Aboubacar Kobele Keita
- Date of birth: April 6, 2000 (age 26)
- Place of birth: New York City, New York, United States
- Height: 6 ft 2 in (1.88 m)
- Position: Center-back

Team information
- Current team: Kalmar FF
- Number: 47

Youth career
- –2016: Santos Columbus FC
- 2016–2018: Columbus Crew

College career
Years	Team	Apps	(Gls)
2018	Virginia Cavaliers	17	(1)

Senior career*
Years	Team	Apps	(Gls)
2019–2021	Columbus Crew	37	(0)
2019	→ Richmond Kickers (loan)	3	(0)
2022–2024	Colorado Rapids	0	(0)
2023	Colorado Rapids 2	8	(0)
2024	→ Bohemians (loan)	16	(1)
2024	Columbus Crew 2	7	(1)
2025–	Kalmar FF	22	(3)

International career^{‡}
2019	United States U20	8	(0)
2026–	Guinea	2	(0)
- * Club domestic league appearances and goals as of 13 November 2025 ‡ National team caps and goals as of 1 October 2026

Aboubacar Kobele Keita (born April 6, 2000) is a professional soccer player who plays as a center-back for Kalmar FF. Born in the United States, he represents Guinea internationally.

Keita was born in New York City but grew up in Ohio, playing for the Crew Academy. After just one year in college at Virginia, he signed with the Columbus Crew as a Homegrown Player. Keita made his professional debut in 2019 while on loan to Richmond Kickers in USL League One.

== Early life ==
Although he was born in New York City, Keita was raised in Guinea, moved to Westerville, Ohio, at the age of 10 and attended Westerville North High School. As a sophomore, he was named Honorable Mention All-Ohio Capital Conference while primarily playing as a forward. He joined the Crew Academy in 2016, playing in the U.S. Soccer Development Academy for the U16/17 and U18/19 teams and scoring once in 43 appearances. Keita also trained with the Crew's first team and played against Charleston Battery at the 2018 Carolina Challenge Cup.

In January 2018, Keita took part in his first international camp, training with the United States U19 team Later that month, he committed to play collegiately at the University of Virginia.

== College ==
Keita made his debut for Virginia on August 24, 2018, starting the season-opener against nationally ranked New Hampshire. He played the full 90 minutes in a 1–0 victory over the Wildcats. On September 28, he scored his first collegiate goal from a header as part of a 2–0 victory against Pittsburgh. Keita appeared in all three postseason games for the Cavaliers, and was eliminated in the third round of the NCAA tournament. After concluding his lone collegiate season with one goal in 17 appearances, Keita was named to the Atlantic Coast Conference All-Freshman Team and earned an invite to a camp for the United States U20 national team.

== Club career ==
=== Columbus Crew ===
On January 22, 2019, Keita was announced as the 12th Homegrown Player signing in Columbus Crew history. Keita had attended his first Crew game at the age of 12 and, as a Crew Academy player, had previously trained with the first team.

In a bid to get acclimated to the professional game, Keita was sent on loan to USL League One club Richmond Kickers on March 6, 2019. The loan was for the duration of the 2019 USL League One season, with Columbus able to recall him at any point during the year. Keita made his professional debut on April 27 versus Chattanooga Red Wolves, coming on in the 77th minute to help Richmond see out a 1–0 victory. After suffering an injury during the U20 World Cup, Keita returned to Columbus from his loan to Richmond. On July 3, he made his debut for Columbus with a midweek start against Real Salt Lake. Keita would go on to make 10 appearances throughout the season for Columbus.

Before COVID-19 pandemic disrupted the initial start to the 2020 MLS season, Keita started and played 90 minutes in one of Columbus's first two games. Keita went on to make a total of 13 appearances for Columbus during the Covid-shortened 2020 season, 12 appearances during the regular season and 1 appearance during the playoffs. Keita was part of the team that won MLS Cup 2020.

Keita made his debut for Columbus during the 2021 season by starting in the second leg of the CONCACAF Champions League game against Real Estelí; helping Columbus to a 1–0 win.

=== Colorado Rapids ===
On January 5, 2022, Keita was traded to Colorado Rapids in exchange for $300,000 in General Allocation Money In March it was announced that Keita had undergone successful ACL surgery on his right knee, which put him out the entirety of the 2022 MLS season. Keita signed a contract extension with the Rapids in August 2023.

On 22 February 2024, Keita joined League of Ireland Premier Division club Bohemians on a one-year loan. He made his debut in a loss to Drogheda United and was in and out of the lineup following a managerial change. He returned to the starting lineup in a 1–0 win over Shelbourne. During this period, Keita was observing Ramadan and noted that fasting affected his match fitness. He made 16 appearances and scored one goal before the loan was mutually terminated on 15 August where he was subsequently released by the Rapids.

=== Columbus Crew 2 ===
In late August 2024, Keita signed with Columbus Crew 2 in MLS Next Pro, where he remained until the end of the season.

=== Kalmar FF ===
On 14 February 2025, after a trial with Finnish club Ilves, he signed for Superettan club Kalmar FF on a two-year deal. He scored a brace in a 2–0 match versus Umeå FC. Kalmar FF advanced to Sweden's first division Allsvenskan in 2026.

== International career ==
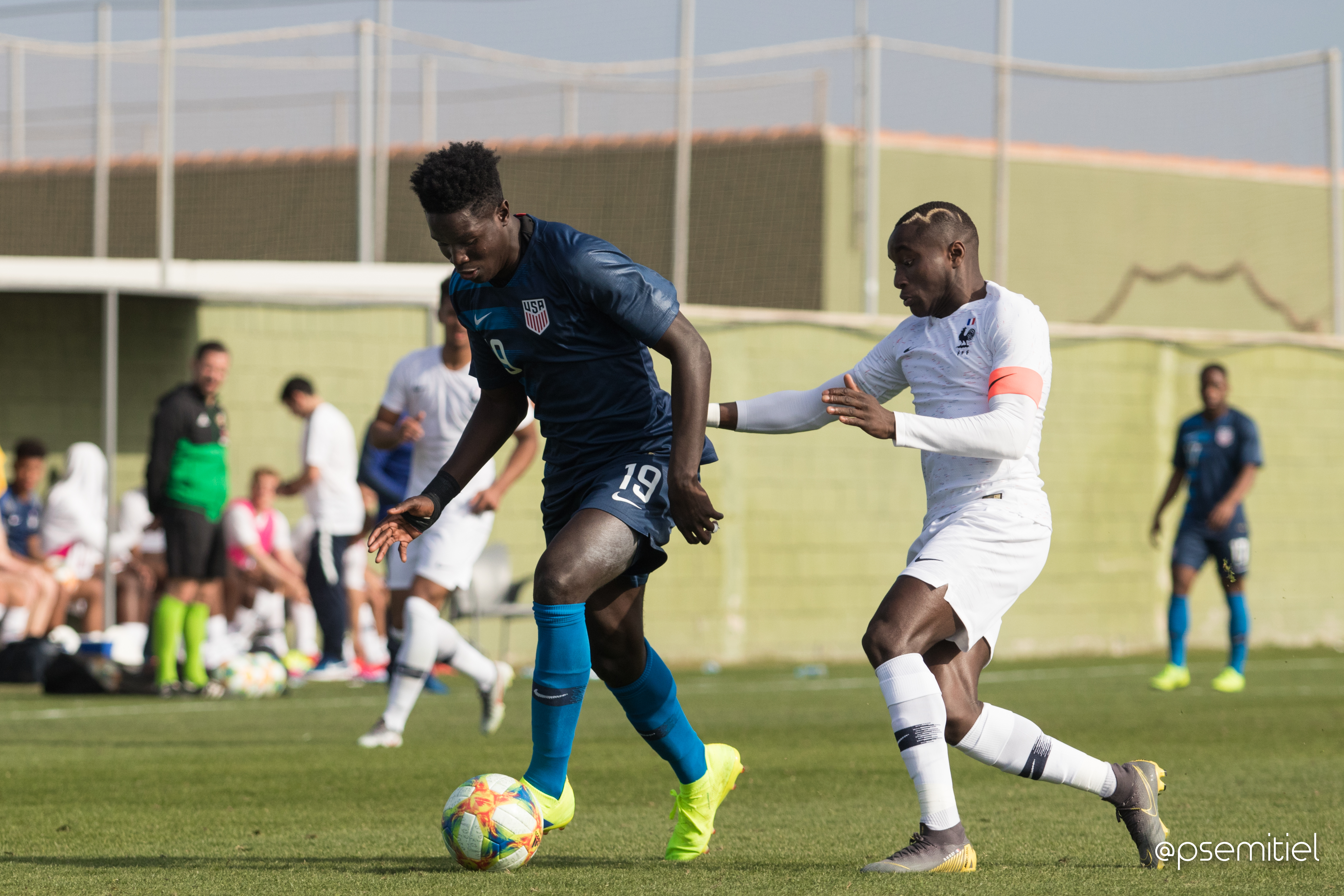
Keita playing for the U20s

After earning previous camp call-ups for the United States U17, U18, and U19 national teams, Keita earned his first youth caps with the United States U20 team in March 2019. In the team's final camp ahead of the 2019 FIFA U-20 World Cup, he came off the bench against France on March 22 and provided Christian Cappis with a match-tying assist in second-half stoppage time; Keita also started three days later against Japan. On May 10, he was named to the final roster for the tournament by head coach Tab Ramos. Keita started all five games for the United States, playing every minute of the tournament until being subbed off in the 86th minute of the team's quarterfinal match against Ecuador. Throughout the tournament, he was noted to be sound defensively but struggled with distribution.

On 26 September 2026, Keita made his debut for the Guinea national team in an AFCON qualifier against South Africa.

== Career statistics ==
As of match played on 11 May 2025

Club	Season	League			National cup (Note: Includes U.S. Open Cup, FAI Cup & Svenska Cupen)		Continental		Other		Total	
Club	Season	Division	Apps	Goals	Apps	Goals	Apps	Goals	Apps	Goals	Apps	Goals
Columbus Crew	2019	MLS	10	0	0	0	–		–		10	0
Columbus Crew	2020	MLS	11	0	0	0	–		1 (Note: Appearance in MLS is Back Tournament knockout stage)	0	12	0
Columbus Crew	2021	MLS	16	0	0	0	2 (Note: Appearance(s) in CONCACAF Champions League)	0	1 (Note: Appearance in Campeones Cup)	0	19	0
Columbus Crew	Total		37	0	0	0	2	0	2	0	41	0
Richmond Kickers (loan)	2019	USL League One	3	0	–		–		–		3	0
Colorado Rapids	2022	MLS	0	0	0	0	–		–		0	0
Colorado Rapids 2	2023	MLS Next Pro	8	0	–		–		–		8	0
Bohemians (loan)	2024	LOI Premier Division	16	1	0	0	–		–		16	1
Columbus Crew 2	2024	MLS Next Pro	7	1	–		–		–		7	1
Ilves	2025	Veikkausliiga	0	0	0	0	0	0	1 (Note: Appearance in Finnish League Cup)	0	1	0
Kalmar FF	2025	Superettan	7	0	1	0	–		–		8	0
Career total			76	2	1	0	2	0	3	0	82	2

== Honors ==
Columbus Crew

- MLS Cup: 2020
- Campeones Cup: 2021

Individual

- ACC All-Freshman Team: 2018
