= 2014 LA Galaxy II season =

LA Galaxy II
2014 season
- Manager: Curt Onalfo
- Stadium: StubHub Center; Track & Field Stadium
- USL Pro: 3rd
- USL Pro Playoffs: Semi-final
- U.S. Open Cup: Third round
- Top goalscorer: League: Chandler Hoffman – 14 goals All: Chandler Hoffman – 14 goals
- Highest home attendance: 2,478 (September 13 v. Rochester)
- Lowest home attendance: 408 (September 1 v. Richmond)
- Average home league attendance: 597
Home colors	Away colors

LA Galaxy II played their first season in 2014. They participated in the USL Pro and the U.S. Open Cup.

== Players ==
=== Squad information ===
The squad of LA Galaxy II was composed of an unrestricted number of first-team players on loan to the reserve team, players signed by Galaxy II, and LA Galaxy Academy players. Academy players who appeared in matches with LA Galaxy II retained their college eligibility.

Daniel Steres was named captain, and was named Defender of the Year.

Note: Flags indicate national team as defined under FIFA eligibility rules; some limited exceptions apply. Players may hold more than one non-FIFA nationality. Squad correct as of April 11, 2014.

No.	Pos.	Nation	Player
25	MF	USA	Rafael Garcia
27	FW	USA	Charlie Rugg
32	FW	USA	Jack McBean (HGP)
34	MF	USA	Kenney Walker
36	DF	USA	Oscar Sorto (HGP)
38	FW	USA	Bradford Jamieson IV (HGP)
40	FW	MEX	Raúl Mendiola (HGP)
41	GK	USA	Cody Laurendi
43	DF	USA	Logan Emory
44	DF	USA	Daniel Steres
48	MF	MKD	Dragan Stojkov
50	FW	USA	Travis Bowen
53	DF	FRA	Bradley Diallo
55	DF	FRA	Jason Bli
56	MF	FRA	Laurent Courtois
57	MF	USA	Alejandro Covarrubias
58	FW	USA	Kainoa Bailey
59	MF	USA	Elijah Martin
61	MF	USA	Jaime Villarreal
63	MF	FRA	André Auras
64	GK	USA	Nicholas Shackelford
66	DF	USA	Joe Franco
72	DF	USA	Lee Nishanian

=== Coaching staff ===
Role	Name	Nation
Head coach	Curt Onalfo	United States
Player-Coach	Laurent Courtois	France

== Friendlies ==
February 13	Fresno Fuego	1–2	LA Galaxy II	Fresno, California
7:00pm	Ellison 44'		Bowen 11'; Mendiola 22'	Stadium: Chukchansi Park

February 22	LA Galaxy	3–0	LA Galaxy II	Carson, California
7:30pm	Keane 2' 24' (pen.); Samuel 68'			Stadium: StubHub Center

== USL Pro ==
=== Standings ===
Pos	Team	Pld	W	T	L	GF	GA	GD	Pts	Qualification
1	Orlando City (C)	28	19	5	4	56	24	+32	62	Commissioner's Cup, Playoffs
2	Sacramento Republic FC (A)	28	17	4	7	49	28	+21	55	Playoffs
3	LA Galaxy II (A)	28	15	6	7	54	38	+16	51	Playoffs
4	Richmond Kickers (A)	28	13	12	3	53	28	+25	51	Playoffs
5	Charleston Battery (A)	28	11	8	9	36	31	+5	41	Playoffs

Source: USL Pro official standings
Rules for classification: 1) points; 2) goal difference; 3) number of goals scored.
(A) Advances to USL Pro Playoffs; (C) Commissioner's Cup (best regular season record)

=== Results summary ===
Overall								Home						Away					
Pld	W	D	L	GF	GA	GD	Pts	W	D	L	GF	GA	GD	W	D	L	GF	GA	GD
19	10	5	4	36	21	+15	35	7	2	1	28	14	+14	3	3	3	8	7	+1

Source: Match reports

Round	1	2	3	4	5	6	7	8	9	10	11	12	13	14	15	16	17	18	19	20	21	22	23	24	25	26	27	28
Stadium	H	H	H	H	A	A	H	H	A	A	H	H	H	A	H	A	A	A	H	A	A	H	A	A	H	H	A	A
Result	W	D	W	L	W	D	W	W	D	L	W	W	W	L	L	D	L	W	P	W	W	L	L	W	W	D	D	W

Updated to match(es) played on July 14, 2014. Source: Match reports
A = Away; H = Home; W = Win; D = Draw; L = Loss; P = Postponed

=== Regular season ===
All times from this point on Pacific Daylight Saving Time (UTC−07:00)

March 22 1	LA Galaxy II	3–1	Orange County Blues FC	Carson, California
7:30pm	Covarrubias (yellow card) 8'; Garcia (yellow card) 34'; Rugg 40'; Walker 45'; Emory (yellow card) 52'; Steres 54'	Report	O'Leary (yellow card) 34'; Okai 42' (yellow card) 58'; Santana (yellow card) 54'	Stadium: StubHub Center Track & Field Stadium; Attendance: 1,259; Referee: Bernhard Hosu

March 29 2	LA Galaxy II	1–1	Sacramento Republic FC	Carson, California
7:30pm	Emory (yellow card) 40'; Hoffman 81'	Report	López (yellow card) 12'; Braun 33'; Alvarez (yellow card) 52'; Daly (yellow card) 82'	Stadium: StubHub Center Track & Field Stadium; Attendance: 1,085; Referee: Reed Christy

April 7 3	LA Galaxy II	4–2	Oklahoma City Energy FC	Carson, California
7:30pm	Courtois 14'; Hoffman 35'; Steres 39'; Auras (yellow card) 48'; Djokovic 90+'	Report	Doue 8'; Morad (yellow card) 45'; Thomas (yellow card) 57'; Caringi 59'	Stadium: StubHub Center Track & Field Stadium; Attendance: 525; Referee: Christopher Calderon

April 13 4	LA Galaxy II	0–3	Sacramento Republic FC	Carson, California
3:00pm	Auras (yellow card) 19'; Courtois (yellow card) 38'	Report	Mirković (yellow card) 14'; Daly 33'; Alvarez (yellow card) 41' (goal) 45'; Collins 75'	Stadium: StubHub Center Track & Field Stadium; Attendance: 588; Referee: Baboucarr Jallow

April 19 5	LA Galaxy II	3–1	Orange County Blues FC	Carson, California
7:30pm	Auras (yellow card) 37'; Rugg 49'; Garcia (yellow card) 61'; Hoffman 73'; Courtois 90'	Report	Bardsley (yellow card) 6'; Santana 9'; Gautrat (red card) 88'	Stadium: StubHub Center Track & Field Stadium; Attendance: 435; Referee: Daniel Radford

April 25 6	Arizona United SC	1–1	LA Galaxy II	Peoria, Arizona
7:10pm	Dillon (yellow card) 31'; DelPiccolo 68'	Report	Mendiola 35'; Auras (yellow card) 38'; Sorto (yellow card) 46'; Diallo (red card) 89'	Stadium: Peoria Sports Complex; Attendance: 2,818; Referee: Charles Farr

April 27 7	Orange County Blues FC	0–3	LA Galaxy II	Irvine, California
4:00pm	Momeni (yellow card) 29' (red card) 76'; McKenzie (yellow card) 32'; Rivera (yellow card) 56'	Report	Garcia 34'; Arreola (yellow card) 45'; Bowen 50'; Zardes 65'	Stadium: Anteater Stadium; Attendance: 913; Referee: Ramon Hernandez

May 5 8	LA Galaxy II	2–1	Charlotte Eagles	Carson, California
7:10pm	Rugg 28'; Garcia (yellow card) 51'; Hoffman 55'	Report	Toby (yellow card) 14'; Herrera 35' (pen.); Gold (yellow card) 44'; Gentile (yellow card) 52'; Leathers (yellow card) 61'	Stadium: StubHub Center Track & Field Stadium; Attendance: 410; Referee: Ramon Hernandez

May 10 9	Dayton Dutch Lions	1–1	LA Galaxy II	West Carrollton, Ohio
7:00pm	Schoenfeld 43' (pen.); Harada (red card) 65'; Cruyff (yellow card) 84'	Report	Hoffman 41'; Arreola (yellow card) 43'	Stadium: DOC Stadium; Attendance: 831; Referee: Edwin Durisevic

May 17 10	Sacramento Republic FC	2–1	LA Galaxy II	Sacramento, California
7:30pm	Stewart 7'; López 67'; Daly (yellow card) 87'	Report	Venter 16'; Bowen (yellow card) 25'; Garcia (red card) 51'; Diallo (yellow card) 67'	Stadium: Hughes Stadium; Attendance: 20,231; Referee: Nestor Chavez

May 25 11	LA Galaxy II	5–0	Oklahoma City Energy FC	Carson, California
8:00pm	Hoffman 13', 22'; Jamieson IV 51', 55'; McBean 69'	Report		Stadium: StubHub Center; Attendance: 738; Referee: Tyler Ploeger

June 1 12	Seattle Sounders Reserves	0–1	LA Galaxy II	Tukwila, Washington
1:00pm	DeGroot (yellow card) 65'	Report	Steres (yellow card) 7'; Hoffman 76'	Stadium: Starfire Sports Complex; Referee: Katja Koroleva

June 8 13	LA Galaxy II	5–1	Dayton Dutch Lions	Carson, California
7:30pm	Jamieson IV 8', 45'; McBean 25', 39'; Stojkov (yellow card) 35'; Rugg 42'; Bowen (yellow card) 77'	Report	Schoenfeld 75'	Stadium: StubHub Center; Attendance: 850; Referee: Adrian Gonzalez

June 11 14	LA Galaxy II	1–2	Rochester Rhinos	Carson, California
7:30pm	Sorto (yellow card) 45'; McBean (yellow card) 50'; Auras (yellow card) 68'; Garcia 75'	Report	Mendoza 8'; Dixon 29'; Banks (yellow card) 44'; Obasi (yellow card) 72'; Rolfe (yellow card) 90'	Stadium: StubHub Center; Attendance: 561; Referee: Alejandro Mariscal

June 14 15	Charleston Battery	3–0	LA Galaxy II	Charleston, South Carolina
4:30pm	Falvey 25'; Kelly 50'; Cordovés 85'	Report		Stadium: Blackbaud Stadium; Attendance: 3,377; Referee: Richonne Clark

June 21 16	Arizona United SC	1–1	LA Galaxy II	Peoria, Arizona
7:10pm	Morrison 54'; Antúnez (yellow card) 74'; Woodberry (yellow card) 88'	Report	Bowen 17'	Stadium: Peoria Sports Complex; Attendance: 1,808; Referee: Jon Freemon

June 28 17	Orlando City	3–0	LA Galaxy II	Lake Buena Vista, Florida
4:30pm	Hertzog 18', 43'; Molino 61'; Cerén (yellow card) 68'; Quinn (yellow card) 86'	Report	Garcia (yellow card) 43'	Stadium: ESPN Wide World of Sports; Attendance: 5,029; Referee: Patrick O'Brian

July 4 18	LA Galaxy II	4–2	Arizona United SC	Carson, California
7:00pm	Jamieson IV 16'; Rugg 18', 45'; Antúnez 41' (o.g.); Sorto (yellow card) 58'	Report	Okafor 76' (pen.); Kassel 90+2'	Stadium: StubHub Center Track & Field Stadium; Attendance: 415; Referee: Alex Chilowicz

July 19 20	Oklahoma City Energy FC	0–1	LA Galaxy II	Oklahoma City, Oklahoma
6:00pm	Hedrick (yellow card) 43'; Leichty (yellow card) 55'	Report	Stojkov (yellow card) 45'; Emory (yellow card) 67'; Mendiola 75'	Stadium: Pribil Stadium; Attendance: 4,102; Referee: Kyle Phillips

July 26 21	Orange County Blues FC	0–4	LA Galaxy II	Irvine, California
7:00pm	Gautrat (yellow card) 30'	Report	Auras 4'; Hoffman 40', 41'; Stojkov 64'	Stadium: Anteater Stadium; Attendance: 1,226; Referee: Bernhard Hosu

July 30 22	Harrisburg City Islanders	3–1	LA Galaxy II	Harrisburg, Pennsylvania
4:00pm	Hardware 17'; McLaughlin 54'; Derschang 86'	Report	Garcia 40'; Mendiola (yellow card) 76'	Stadium: Skyline Sports Complex; Attendance: 1,833; Referee: Jarolaw Werel

August 2 23	Pittsburgh Riverhounds	3–1	LA Galaxy II	Pittsburgh, Pennsylvania
4:00pm	Ngwenya 30'; Earls 39', (yellow card) 62'; Flunder (yellow card) 40'; Kerr 78'	Report	Villarreal 18'; Garcia (yellow card) 66' (yellow-red card) 88'; Mendiola (yellow card) 62'; Bowen (yellow card) 90'	Stadium: Highmark Stadium; Attendance: 2,243; Referee: Brandon Artis

August 9 24	LA Galaxy II	3–2	Arizona United SC	Carson, California
7:30pm	Rugg 9'; Jamieson IV 10'; Auras 37'; Villarreal (yellow card) 42'	Report	Kassel (yellow card) 47'; DelPiccolo 60'; Tan 72'; Morrison (yellow card) ?'	Stadium: StubHub Center Track & Field Stadium; Attendance: 535; Referee: Christopher Calderon

August 16 25	Oklahoma City Energy FC	0–1	LA Galaxy II	Oklahoma City, Oklahoma
6:00pm	Doue (yellow card) 38'; Badr (yellow card) 79'	Report	Steres 19'; Sorto (yellow card) 30'; Diallo (yellow card) 80' (yellow-red card) 90'; Stojkov (yellow card) 90'	Stadium: Pribil Stadium; Attendance: 4,089; Referee: Andrew Musashe

August 24 26	LA Galaxy II	3–3	Wilmington Hammerheads	Carson, California
7:30pm	Hoffman 14', 53'; Steres (yellow card) 33'; Bailey (yellow card) 57'; Villarreal (yellow card) 61'; Garcia 90'	Report	Fairclough (yellow card) 22'; Ruggles (yellow card) 68'; Jane 77', 83'; Kaye 86'; Ackley (yellow card) 90'	Stadium: StubHub Center Track & Field Stadium; Attendance: 423; Referee: Alejar Mariscal

September 1 27	LA Galaxy II	1–1	Richmond Kickers	Carson, California
7:00pm	Bli (yellow card) 27'; Hoffman 43' (pen.); Villarreal (yellow card) 45'	Report	Basso (yellow card) 8'; William 68', (yellow card) 87'	Stadium: StubHub Center Track & Field Stadium; Attendance: 408; Referee: Denis Vargas

September 6 28	Sacramento Republic FC	1–2	LA Galaxy II	Sacramento, California
7:30pm	Klimenta (yellow card) 50'; Guzman (yellow card) 51'; Alvarez 69'; Collins (yellow card) 89'	Report	McBean 18', 59'; Villarreal (yellow card) 27'; Rugg (yellow card) 70'; Bli (yellow card) 82'; Covarrubias (yellow card) 90'	Stadium: Hughes Stadium; Attendance: 8,000; Referee: Alex del Angel Jr.

=== Playoffs ===
The 2014 USL PRO Playoffs include the top eight finishers in the table, with the quarterfinals (No. 1 vs. No. 8, No. 2 vs. No. 7, etc.) set for the weekend of September 12–14. The semifinals featuring the four remaining teams will be played the following weekend, with the 2014 USL PRO Championship set for the weekend of September 26–28. All playoff rounds feature a single-game knockout format and teams will not be re-seeded following each round.

Quarterfinals
1	Orlando City	0
8	Harrisburg City Islanders	1
4	Richmond Kickers (a.e.t.)	2
5	Charleston Battery	1
2	Sacramento Republic	4
7	Wilmington Hammerheads	1
3	LA Galaxy II	2
6	Rochester Rhinos	1

Semifinals
8	Harrisburg City Islanders	3
4	Richmond Kickers	2
2	Sacramento Republic	3
3	LA Galaxy II	2

USL Pro Championship
8	Harrisburg City Islanders	0
2	Sacramento Republic	2

==== Quarter-final ====
September 13	LA Galaxy II	2–1	Rochester Rhinos	Carson, California
7:30pm	Hoffman 29'; Stojkov (yellow card) 42'; Rugg (yellow card) 45', (goal) 62'; Garcia (yellow card) 45' (yellow-red card) 65'; Bli (yellow card) 90+3'	Report	Rosenlund (yellow card) 16'; Banks 22'; Smith (yellow card) 90+5'	Stadium: StubHub Center; Attendance: 2,478; Referee: Daniel Radford

==== Semi-finals ====
September 20	Sacramento Republic	3–2	LA Galaxy II	Sacramento, California
7:30pm	López (yellow card) 57', (goal) 70' (pen.), 84' (pen.), 90' (pen.); Klimenta (yellow card) 82'	Report	Rugg 26'; Jamieson IV 44'; Sorto (yellow card) 74'	Stadium: Bonney Field; Attendance: 8,000; Referee: Baboucarr Jallow

== U.S. Open Cup ==
=== Second round ===
May 14 Second round	LA Galaxy II (California)	6–1	(California) Cal FC	Carson, California
7:30pm	Emory (yellow card) 4'; Covarrubias 6'; Diallo 24'; Bowen 30', 33'; McBean 45'; Steres (yellow card) 79'; Đoković 82'	Report	Reza 50'; Bonvehi (yellow card) 57'; Alfaro (yellow card) 75'; Riley (yellow card) 88'	Stadium: StubHub Center Track & Field Stadium

=== Third round ===
May 28 Third round	LA Galaxy II (California)	0–0 (a.e.t.) (1–3 p)	(California) PSA Elite	Carson, California
7:30pm	McBean (yellow card) 87'; Garcia (yellow card) 97'; Auras (yellow card) 103'	Report	Salazar (yellow card) 21'; Barron (yellow card) 65'; Smith (yellow card) 88'; Preciado (yellow card) 100'	Stadium: StubHub Center Track & Field Stadium; Referee: Michael Zapata

== See also ==
- 2014 in American soccer
- 2014 USL Pro season
- 2014 LA Galaxy season
