= 2015 LA Galaxy II season =

LA Galaxy II
2015 season
- Manager: Curt Onalfo
- Stadium: StubHub Center
- USL: Conference: 5th Playoffs: Runner-up
- U.S. Open Cup: Second round
- Top goalscorer: League: Ariel Lassiter (14 goals); All: Ariel Lassiter (15 goals)
- Highest home attendance: 1,817 (Sep 16 vs. Portland Timbers 2)
- Lowest home attendance: 300 (May 20 vs. Ventura County Fusion)
- Average home league attendance: 900
Home colors	Away colors

The 2015 LA Galaxy II season was the club's second season of existence. This season LA Galaxy II participated in the USL and the U.S. Open Cup.

== Players ==
=== Squad information ===
Note: Flags indicate national team as defined under FIFA eligibility rules; some limited exceptions apply. Players may hold more than one non-FIFA nationality. Squad correct as of August 5, 2015.

No.	Pos.	Nation	Player
32	FW	USA	Jack McBean
41	GK	FRA	Clément Diop
44	DF	USA	Daniel Steres
46	FW	CRC	Ariel Lassiter
47	MF	URU	Bryan Olivera
48	MF	JPN	Ryo Fujii
49	MF	USA	Adrian Vera
50	FW	USA	Travis Bowen
53	DF	FRA	Bradley Diallo
54	GK	USA	Bennett Sneddon
55	DF	FRA	Jason Bli
57	MF	USA	Alejandro Covarrubias
58	FW	USA	Kainoa Bailey
59	MF	USA	Elijah Martin
63	MF	FRA	André Auras
64	GK	USA	Nicholas Shackelford
65	MF	USA	Jaime Villarreal
66	DF	USA	Joe Franco
72	DF	USA	Lee Nishanian
73	FW	USA	Adonis Amaya
75	GK	USA	Eric Lopez

=== Transfers ===
==== Transfers in ====
Pos.	Player	Transferred from	Fee/notes	Date	Source
GK	(United States) Eric Lopez	(United States) LA Galaxy Academy	Sign	November 3, 2014	
MF	(Costa Rica) Ariel Lassiter	(Sweden) GAIS	Sign	January 29, 2015	
MF	(Japan) Ryo Fujii	(United States) LA Galaxy Academy	Sign	February 10, 2015	
FW	(United States) Adonis Amaya	(United States) LA Galaxy Academy	Sign	March 19, 2015	
MF	(United States) Elijah Martin	(United States) LA Galaxy Academy	Sign	March 19, 2015	
MF	(United States) Adrian Vera	(United States) LA Galaxy Academy	Sign	July 20, 2015	
GK	(United States) Bennett Sneddon	(United States) LA Galaxy Academy	Sign	July 20, 2015	
MF	(Uruguay) Bryan Olivera	(Brazil) Fluminense	Loan	August 10, 2015	

==== Transfers out ====
Pos.	Player	Transferred to	Fee/notes	Date	Source
MF	(North Macedonia) Dragan Stojkov	(United States) Indy Eleven	Sign	November 29, 2014	
FW	(United States) David Romney	(United States) LA Galaxy	Sign	August 5, 2015	

== Competitions ==
=== USL ===
==== Standings ====
Pos	Team	Pld	W	D	L	GF	GA	GD	Pts	Qualification
1	Orange County Blues	28	14	5	9	38	34	+4	47	Conference semi-finals
2	Oklahoma City Energy	28	13	8	7	44	36	+8	47	Conference semi-finals
3	Colorado Springs Switchbacks	28	14	4	10	53	35	+18	46	First round
4	Sacramento Republic	28	13	7	8	43	31	+12	46	First round
5	LA Galaxy II	28	14	3	11	39	31	+8	45	First round
6	Seattle Sounders 2	28	13	3	12	45	42	+3	42	First round
7	Tulsa Roughnecks	28	11	6	11	49	46	+3	39	
8	Portland Timbers 2	28	11	2	15	38	45	−7	35	
9	Austin Aztex	28	10	3	15	32	41	−9	33	
10	Arizona United	28	10	2	16	31	55	−24	32	
11	Vancouver Whitecaps 2	28	8	6	14	39	53	−14	30	
12	Real Monarchs	28	7	8	13	32	42	−10	29	

Source: 2015 USL schedule
Rules for classification: 1) head-to-head; 2) total wins; 3) total goal differential; 4) total goals scored; 5) disciplinary points; 6) away goals scored; 7) away goal differential; 8) home goals scored; 9) home goal differential; 10) coin toss or drawing of lots

==== Results summary ====
Overall								Home						Away					
Pld	W	D	L	GF	GA	GD	Pts	W	D	L	GF	GA	GD	W	D	L	GF	GA	GD
28	14	3	11	39	31	+8	45	5	3	5	16	14	+2	9	0	6	23	17	+6

Source: Match reports

Round	1	2	3	4	5	6	7	8	9	10	11	12	13	14	15	16	17	18	19	20	21	22	23	24	25	26	27	28
Stadium	H	H	H	A	H	A	H	A	H	H	H	A	A	A	H	A	H	A	H	A	A	H	A	H	A	A	H	A
Result	D	L	L	L	W	W	W	L	W	L	W	W	L	W	W	W	D	W	D	W	L	L	W	W	L	L	L	W

Updated to match(es) played on September 19, 2015. Source: Match reports
A = Away; H = Home; W = Win; D = Draw; L = Loss

==== Regular season ====
Win Draw Loss Postponed

All times in Eastern Time.

March 22 1	LA Galaxy II	0–0	Real Monarchs	Carson, California
20:00		Report	McGovern (yellow card) 28'; Ovalle (yellow card) 52'	Stadium: StubHub Center; Attendance: 1,000; Referee: Bernhard Hosu

March 28 2	LA Galaxy II	2–3	Sacramento Republic	Carson, California
22:30	Steres 9'; Covarrubias (yellow card) 22'; Auras (yellow card) 35'; Bli (yellow card) 37'; Bowen 66'	Report	Guzman 13' (pen.), 25' (pen.); Rivas (yellow card) 54'; López 90'	Stadium: StubHub Center; Attendance: 1,292; Referee: Daniel Radford

April 2 3	LA Galaxy II	1–2	Arizona United	Carson, California
22:30	Jamieson IV 19'	Report	Blanco (yellow card) 37'; Chin 52'; Granger (yellow card) 90'; Tan 90+3'	Stadium: StubHub Center; Attendance: 1,352; Referee: Robert Sarfaraz

April 11 4	Sacramento Republic	3–1	LA Galaxy II	Sacramento, California
22:30	López 22'; Klimenta 26'; Estrada 45'	Report	McBean (yellow card) 19'; Villarreal (yellow card) 37'; Lassiter 58'	Stadium: Bonney Field; Attendance: 10,906; Referee: Bernhard Hosu

April 19 5	LA Galaxy II	2–1	Austin Aztex	Carson, California
20:00	Steres (yellow card) 39'; Lassiter 64'; Mendiola 84'; Maganto (yellow card) 90+1'	Report	Guaraci (yellow card) 25'; Ambrose (yellow card) 74'; Touray 80'	Stadium: StubHub Center; Attendance: 727; Referee: Bernhard Hosu

April 25 6	Real Monarchs	0–1	LA Galaxy II	Sandy, Utah
22:00	Baldin (yellow card) 55'	Report	Auras (yellow card) 26'; Diallo 90+2'	Stadium: Rio Tinto Stadium; Attendance: 1,001; Referee: Brad Jensen

May 3 7	LA Galaxy II	2–1	Vancouver Whitecaps 2	Carson, California
20:00	Bowen 33'; Steres (yellow card) 48'; Auras (yellow card) 82'; Lassiter 88'; Romney (yellow card) 90'	Report	Schuler 35'; Piraux (yellow card) 69'	Stadium: StubHub Center; Attendance: 1,164; Referee: Alejandro Mariscal

May 9 8	Oklahoma City Energy	v	LA Galaxy II	Oklahoma City, Oklahoma
20:00				Stadium: Taft Stadium
Note: Match rescheduled for August 4 due to severe weather.

May 13 9	LA Galaxy II	2–0	Tulsa Roughnecks	Carson, California
22:30	Lassiter 58'; McBean 72'; Villareal (yellow card) 76'; Martin (yellow card) 81'; Amaya (yellow card) 90'	Report	Grimes (yellow card) 3'; Davoren (yellow card) 84'	Stadium: StubHub Center; Attendance: 533; Referee: Daniel Radford

May 17 10	LA Galaxy II	0–1	Sacramento Republic	Carson, California
19:15	Bli (yellow card) 67'; Villarreal (yellow card) 83'	Report	López 65'; Mirković (yellow card) 71'	Stadium: StubHub Center; Attendance: 689; Referee: Ramy Touchan

May 30 11	LA Galaxy II	2–1	Colorado Springs Switchbacks	Carson, California
22:30	Auras (yellow card) 11'; Bowen (yellow card) 36'; Steres 45'; Mendiola (yellow card) 81', (goal) 90'	Report	Gonzalez 16'; Gorrick (yellow card) 90'	Stadium: StubHub Center; Attendance: 560; Referee: Bernhard Hosu

June 6 12	Orange County Blues	1–2	LA Galaxy II	Irvine, California
22:00	Cortez 53'	Report	Diallo (yellow card) 7'; Mendiola 28'; Auras (yellow card) 64'; Bailey 70'	Stadium: Anteater Stadium; Attendance: 3,000; Referee: Hector Perez

June 11 13	Seattle Sounders 2	1–0	LA Galaxy II	Tukwila, Washington
22:30	Correa (yellow card) 8'; Kovar 72'; Sérgio Mota (red card) 88'	Report	Diallo (yellow card) 27'; Bowen (yellow card) 48'; McBean (yellow card) 80'; Fujii (yellow card) 90'	Stadium: Starfire Sports; Attendance: 2,059; Referee: Levi Rippy

June 14 14	Vancouver Whitecaps 2	0–2	LA Galaxy II	University Endowment Lands, British Columbia
17:00	Serban (yellow card) 17'; Rosenlund (yellow card) 83'	Report	Bowen 43', (yellow card) 69'; Lassiter 59' (pen.)	Stadium: Thunderbird Stadium; Attendance: 2,342; Referee: Alain Ruch

June 19 15	LA Galaxy II	3–0	Orange County Blues	Carson, California
22:30	Romney 21'; McBean (yellow card) 44'; Auras (yellow card) 47'; Bowen 59'; Lassiter 89'	Report	Cortez (yellow card) 62'	Stadium: StubHub Center; Attendance: 1,121; Referee: Alex Chilowicz

June 27 16	Tulsa Roughnecks	2–4	LA Galaxy II	Tulsa, Oklahoma
20:30	Davoren 13'; Bardsley (yellow card) 70', (goal) 83' (pen.)	Report	Mendiola 3'; Jamieson IV 59', 63'; Diallo (yellow card) 72'; Lassiter 85'	Stadium: ONEOK Field; Attendance: 5,275; Referee: Andrew Musashe

July 5 17	LA Galaxy II	1–1	Oklahoma City Energy	Carson, California
17:00	Auras 11'; Villarreal (yellow card) 89'; Bailey (yellow card) 90+3'	Report	König 6'	Stadium: StubHub Center; Attendance: 507; Referee: Michael Radchuk

July 11 18	Sacramento Republic	0–4	LA Galaxy II	Sacramento, California
23:00	Guzman (yellow card) 48'	Report	Villarreal 16'; Lassiter 46'; Auras 49'; Covarrubias (yellow card) 54'; McBean 75'	Stadium: Bonney Field; Attendance: 11,442; Referee: Michael Zapata

July 16 19	LA Galaxy II	1–1	Orange County Blues	Carson, California
22:30	Lassiter 39'; Covarrubias (yellow card) 42'; Jamieson IV (yellow card) 60'; McBean (yellow card) 90'; Steres (yellow card) 90'	Report	Cortez 7'; Griffiths (yellow card) 25' (red card); Petričević (yellow card) 57'; Miranda (yellow card) 71'; Navarro (yellow card) 88'	Stadium: StubHub Center; Attendance: 709; Referee: Victor Rivas

July 26 20	Portland Timbers 2	0–1	LA Galaxy II	Portland, Oregon
22:00	Biglieri (yellow card) 33'; Fochive (yellow card) 60'; Manning (yellow card) 67'	Report	McBean 15'; Auras (yellow card) 29'; Steres (yellow card) 85'	Stadium: Merlo Field; Attendance: 1,734; Referee: Jeff Arthurholtz

July 31 21	Colorado Springs Switchbacks	2–0	LA Galaxy II	Colorado Springs, Colorado
21:00	Vercollone 21', 82' (pen.)	Report		Stadium: Sand Creek Stadium; Attendance: 2,690; Referee: Andrew Musashe

August 4 8	Oklahoma City Energy	2–0	LA Galaxy II	Oklahoma City, Oklahoma
20:00	Tóth 18'; Dalgaard 34'; Townsend (yellow card) 58'	Report	McBean (yellow card) 47'; Lassiter (yellow card) 71'	Stadium: Taft Stadium; Attendance: 4,337; Referee: Jon Freemon

August 9 22	LA Galaxy II	1–2	Arizona United	Carson, California
19:00	Steres (yellow card) 22' (yellow-red card) 88'; Sorto (yellow card) 45'; Auras (yellow card) 59', (goal) 64'; Covarrubias (yellow card) 70'; Vera (yellow card) 80' (yellow-red card) 81'; Diop (yellow card) 90'	Report	Ruthven (yellow card) 27'; Tan 30'; Chin 31'; Johnson (yellow card) 44'; Dillon (yellow card) 90'; Malki (yellow card) 90'	Stadium: StubHub Center; Referee: Esteban Rosano

August 15 23	Austin Aztex	2–3	LA Galaxy II	Austin, Texas
21:00	Caesar 26'; Timbó 34'; Ambrose (yellow card) 54'; Tyrpak (yellow card) 58'	Report	Wolverton (yellow card) 2'; Nishanian (yellow card) 32'; McBean 60', 90+1'; Diallo (yellow card) 74', (goal) 87'	Stadium: House Park; Attendance: 3,564; Referee: Andrew Musashe

August 23 24	LA Galaxy II	1–0	Seattle Sounders 2	Carson, California
20:00	McBean 44'; Olivera (yellow card) 51'	Report	Frano (red card) 61'; Fairclough (yellow card) 79'	Stadium: StubHub Center; Attendance: 1,056; Referee: Victor Rivas

August 29 25	Arizona United	2–1	LA Galaxy II	Scottsdale, Arizona
22:30	Tan 40'; Garcia (yellow card) 45'; Dennis (red card) 79'; Malki (yellow card) 81'; Tshuma 90'	Report	Auras (yellow card) 36'; Olivera 74'	Stadium: Scottsdale Stadium; Attendance: 4,241; Referee: Robert Hullner

September 5 26	Orange County Blues	2–1	LA Galaxy II	Irvine, California
22:00	Griffiths 32'; Ramírez 89'	Report	Diallo (yellow card) 11'; Lassiter 12' (pen.)	Stadium: Anteater Stadium; Attendance: 3,000; Referee: Marco Antonio Vegas

September 16 27	LA Galaxy II	0–1	Portland Timbers 2	Carson, California
22:30	Walker (yellow card) 54'; Franco (yellow card) 90'	Report	Delbridge (yellow card) 38'; Belmar (yellow card) 45'; Winchester 49', (yellow card) 73'	Stadium: StubHub Center; Attendance: 1,817; Referee: Michael Zapata

September 19 28	Colorado Springs Switchbacks	0–1	LA Galaxy II	Colorado Springs, Colorado
21:00	Eloundou (yellow card) 48'; Robinson (yellow card) 88'	Report	Lassiter 9', (red card) 44'; Olivera (yellow card) 26'; Garcia (yellow card) 89'	Stadium: Sand Creek Stadium; Attendance: 3,823; Referee: Tyler Mitcham

==== Playoffs ====
===== First round =====
September 26	Sacramento Republic	0–1	LA Galaxy II	Sacramento, California
22:30 ET	López (yellow card) 41'; Kiffe (yellow card) 69'; Vuković (yellow card) 90'	Report	Olivera 12' (pen.); Bowen (yellow card) 35'; Covarrubias (yellow card) 39'; Walker (yellow card) 88'	Stadium: Bonney Field; Attendance: 11,442; Referee: Alex Chilowicz

===== Conference semifinal =====
October 3	Orange County Blues	0–2	LA Galaxy II	Carson, California
22:00 ET	Navarro (yellow card) 17'; Petričević (yellow card) 90+3'	Report	Lassiter 13', 53'; McBean (yellow card) 46'; Walker (yellow card) 78'; Covarrubias (yellow card) 88'	Stadium: StubHub Center; Attendance: 2,047; Referee: Chipalo Street
Note: The match has been moved due to availability issues with the Orange County Blues home venue of Anteater Stadium at UCI.

===== Conference final =====
October 11	Oklahoma City Energy	1–2	LA Galaxy II	Oklahoma City, Oklahoma
19:00 ET	Evans (yellow card) 30'; Andrews 65'	Report	Lassiter 6'; Auras 22'; Maganto (yellow card) 88'	Stadium: Taft Stadium; Attendance: 7,654; Referee: Jaime Herrera

===== USL Championship =====
October 16	Rochester Rhinos	2–1 (a.e.t.)	LA Galaxy II	Rochester, New York
19:30 ET	Bordeau (yellow card) 57'; Forbes (yellow card) 81'; Samuels 90', 112'	Report	Walker (yellow card) 44'; Lassiter 59'; Maganto (yellow card) 85'	Stadium: Sahlen's Stadium; Attendance: 5,247; Referee: Nima Saghafi

=== U.S. Open Cup ===
Win Draw Loss Postponed

All times in Pacific Time.

==== Second round ====
Draw held on April 8.

May 20	LA Galaxy II (California)	1–2	(California) Ventura County Fusion	Carson, California
19:30	Lassiter 45+2' (pen.), (yellow card) 59'; Covarrubias (yellow card) 72'	Report	LaGrassa 38'; Vom Steeg (yellow card) 45+1'; Abolaji (yellow card) 45+2'; Danladi 90+1'	Stadium: StubHub Center; Attendance: 300; Referee: Reyna Fonseca

=== Champions Soccer LLC International Soccer Challenge ===
November 14	LA Galaxy II	5–1	Sacramento Republic	Bakersfield, California
16:45 PT	? (?); Villareal (?); Jamieson IV (?); Lassiter (?)	Report	? (?)	Stadium: Memorial Stadium

== See also ==
- 2015 in American soccer
- 2015 LA Galaxy season
