= 2017 LA Galaxy season =

American soccer club season

LA Galaxy
2017 season
- Owner: Philip Anschutz (AEG)
- Head coach: Curt Onalfo (until July 27); Sigi Schmid (July 27–)
- Stadium: StubHub Center
- MLS: Conference: 11th Overall: 22nd
- U.S. Open Cup: Quarterfinal
- Top goalscorer: League: Romain Alessandrini (13 goals); All: Romain Alessandrini (13 goals)
- Highest home attendance: 25,667 (3 times)
- Lowest home attendance: 2,195 (vs. Sacramento Republic FC – June 28)
- Average home league attendance: 21,998
Home colors	Away colors

The 2017 LA Galaxy season was the club's twenty-second season of existence, and their twenty-second season in Major League Soccer, the top flight of American soccer.

2017 marked a downturn for the club signalling the end of a dynasty for the Galaxy. It was the first season since 2008 that the Galaxy failed to qualify for the MLS Cup Playoffs, and they finished with the worst record in MLS.

== Players ==
=== Squad information ===
Note: Flags indicate national team as defined under FIFA eligibility rules; some limited exceptions apply. Players may hold more than one non-FIFA nationality. Squad correct as of September 2, 2017.

No.	Pos.	Nation	Player
2	DF	NED	Pele van Anholt
3	DF	ENG	Ashley Cole
4	DF	USA	Dave Romney
5	DF	USA	Daniel Steres
6	MF	BIH	Baggio Hušidić
7	MF	FRA	Romain Alessandrini (DP)
8	MF	MEX	Jonathan dos Santos
10	FW	MEX	Giovani dos Santos (DP)
11	FW	USA	Gyasi Zardes (HGP)
12	GK	USA	Brian Rowe
13	MF	USA	Jermaine Jones
14	DF	USA	Robbie Rogers
15	FW	CRC	Ariel Lassiter
16	DF	USA	Nathan Smith
17	MF	USA	Sebastian Lletget
18	DF	FRA	Bradley Diallo
19	MF	USA	Jaime Villarreal (HGP)
20	FW	USA	Jack McInerney
21	DF	USA	Hugo Arellano (HGP)
22	GK	USA	Jon Kempin
24	FW	GHA	Emmanuel Boateng
25	MF	USA	Rafael Garcia
28	DF	FRA	Michaël Ciani
31	GK	SEN	Clément Diop
32	FW	USA	Jack McBean (HGP)
33	FW	USA	Jose Villarreal (HGP)
38	FW	USA	Bradford Jamieson IV (HGP)
40	MF	MEX	Raúl Mendiola (HGP)
88	MF	POR	João Pedro

=== Transfers ===
==== Transfers in ====
Pos.	Player	Transferred from	Fee/notes	Date	Source
FW	(United States) Jack McBean	(England) Coventry City	Loan return.	January 3, 2017	
DF	(United States) Hugo Arellano	(United States) LA Galaxy II	Sign.	January 13, 2017	
MF	(United States) Jermaine Jones	(United States) Colorado Rapids	Sign.	January 18, 2017	
MF	(Portugal) João Pedro	(Portugal) Vitória de Guimarães	Sign.	January 19, 2017	
MF	(France) Romain Alessandrini	(France) Marseille	Sign.	January 31, 2017	
DF	(France) Bradley Diallo	(United States) LA Galaxy II	Sign.	February 28, 2017	
MF	(United States) Jaime Villarreal	(United States) LA Galaxy II	Sign.	March 2, 2017	
DF	(United States) Nathan Smith	(United States) LA Galaxy II	Sign.	March 2, 2017	
GK	(United States) Jon Kempin	(United States) Sporting Kansas City	Sign.	March 3, 2017	
FW	(United States) Jack McInerney	(United States) Portland Timbers	Sign.	April 18, 2017	
DF	(Netherlands) Pele van Anholt	(Netherlands) Willem II	Sign.	July 12, 2017	
MF	(Mexico) Jonathan dos Santos	(Spain) Villareal	Sign.	July 27, 2017	
DF	(France) Michaël Ciani	Free agent.	Last played for (France) Lorient.	September 2, 2017	

==== Player rights ====
Pos.	Player	Transferred from	Fee/notes	Date	Source
MF	(Mexico) Miguel Aguilar	(United States) D.C. United	Traded for the 2018 MLS SuperDraft 4th round pick.	December 12, 2016	
MF	(United States) Jermaine Jones	(United States) Colorado Rapids	Traded for the 2017 MLS SuperDraft 1st round pick.	December 13, 2016	

==== Draft picks ====
The LA Galaxy passed on making a selection with the 81st overall pick.

==== Transfers out ====
Pos.	Player	Transferred to	Fee/notes	Date	Source
MF	(England) Steven Gerrard	None	Retired.	November 15, 2016	
FW	(Republic of Ireland) Robbie Keane		Departed at the end of the 2016 season.	November 17, 2016	
DF	(Brazil) Leonardo	(United States) Houston Dynamo	Option declined; selected by Houston Dynamo in 2nd Stage of the 2016 MLS Re-Entry Draft.	December 12, 2016	
MF	(United States) Jeff Larentowicz	(United States) Atlanta United FC	Signed as a free agent.	December 14, 2016	
FW	(United States) Mike Magee	None	Retired.	January 4, 2017	
DF	(Guam) A. J. DeLaGarza	(United States) Houston Dynamo	$125,000 in General Allocation Money and $50,000 in Targeted Allocation Money.	January 13, 2017	
FW	(United States) Alan Gordon	(United States) Colorado Rapids	Free agent.	January 23, 2017	
DF	(United States) Oscar Sorto	(United States) Orange County SC	Sign.	February 9, 2017	
GK	(United States) Dan Kennedy	None	Retired.	April 11, 2017	
DF	(Belgium) Jelle Van Damme	(Belgium) Royal Antwerp	$235,000.	August 18, 2017	

== Competitions ==
=== Preseason ===
The first preseason match was announced on December 9, 2016. The full preseason schedule was released on January 20, 2017.

February 7	LA Galaxy	1–1	Tijuana	Carson, California
20:00 PT	Villarreal 52'; Turnley (yellow card) 69'	Report	Pisano 54' (pen.); Muñoz (yellow card) 60'; Vargas (yellow card) 76'; Ortiz (yellow card) 90'	Stadium: StubHub Center; Attendance: 9,150; Referee: Ramy Touchan

February 11	LA Galaxy	0–1	San Jose Earthquakes	Las Vegas, Nevada
19:00 PT		Report	Alashe (yellow card) 84'; García 89'	Stadium: Cashman Field

February 18	LA Galaxy	2–0	Alashkert FC	Ventura, California
	Giovani 40'; McBean 85'	Report		Stadium: Ventura College Sportsplex; Attendance: Closed-door

February 21	LA Galaxy	1–0	Real Salt Lake	Carson, California
	Villarreal 40'	Report		Stadium: StubHub Center; Attendance: Closed-door

February 25	LA Galaxy	1–2	Portland Timbers	Carson, California
19:30 PT	João Pedro (yellow card) 46'; Steres 81'	Report	Adi 29', 57', (yellow card) 53'; Ridgewell (yellow card) 38'; Blanco (yellow card) 61'; Guzmán (yellow card) 77'	Stadium: StubHub Center; Attendance: 10,364; Referee: Alex Chilowicz

=== Mid-season Friendlies ===
July 15	LA Galaxy	2–5	Manchester United	Carson, California
19:00 PT	Giovani 79', 88'	Report	Rashford 2', 20'; Fellaini 26'; Mkhitaryan 67'; Martial 72'	Stadium: StubHub Center; Attendance: 25,667; Referee: Kevin Stott

=== Major League Soccer ===
==== Standings ====
===== Overall =====
Pos	Team	Pld	W	L	T	GF	GA	GD	Pts
18	Orlando City SC	34	10	15	9	39	58	−19	39
19	Minnesota United FC	34	10	18	6	47	70	−23	36
20	Colorado Rapids	34	9	19	6	31	51	−20	33
21	D.C. United	34	9	20	5	31	60	−29	32
22	LA Galaxy	34	8	18	8	45	67	−22	32

Source: MLS
Rules for classification: 1) points; 2) total wins; 3) total goal differential; 4) total goals scored; 5) disciplinary points; 6) away goals scored; 7) away goal differential; 8) coin toss or drawing of lots

===== Western Conference =====
Pos	Team	Pld	W	L	T	GF	GA	GD	Pts
7	FC Dallas	34	11	10	13	48	48	0	46
8	Real Salt Lake	34	13	15	6	48	56	−8	45
9	Minnesota United FC	34	10	18	6	47	70	−23	36
10	Colorado Rapids	34	9	19	6	31	51	−20	33
11	LA Galaxy	34	8	18	8	45	67	−22	32

Source: MLS

==== Regular season ====
All times in Pacific Time Zone.

March 4 1	LA Galaxy	1–2	FC Dallas	Carson, California
13:00	Jones (yellow card) 17'; João Pedro (yellow card) 41'; Giovani 53' (pen.)	Report	Urruti 47'; Acosta 69'; Figueroa (yellow card) 83'; Hedges (yellow card) 85'	Stadium: StubHub Center; Attendance: 23,554; Referee: Kevin Stott

March 12 2	LA Galaxy	0–1	Portland Timbers	Carson, California
16:00	Van Damme (yellow card) 31' (yellow-red card) 34'; Garcia (yellow card) 52'	Report	Chará 8'; Nagbe (yellow card) 24'; Powell (yellow card) 75'	Stadium: StubHub Center; Attendance: 20,982; Referee: Baldomero Toledo

March 18 3	Real Salt Lake	1–2	LA Galaxy	Sandy, Utah
18:30	Movsisyan 18'; Beckerman (red card) 44'; Mulholland (yellow card) 34'; Rusnák (yellow card) 61'; Schuler (yellow card) 90'	Report	Alessandrini (yellow card) 45+1'; Romney 69'; Boateng 74'; Smith (yellow card) 89'	Stadium: Rio Tinto Stadium; Attendance: 20,348; Referee: Sorin Stoica

April 1 4	Vancouver Whitecaps FC	4–2	LA Galaxy	Vancouver, British Columbia
19:00	Techera 19'; Montero 66', (yellow card) 80'; Laba 67', 87'	Report	Alessandrini 26', 30'; McBean (yellow card) 60'; Jones (yellow card) 77'	Stadium: BC Place; Attendance: 25,083; Referee: Allen Chapman

April 7 5	LA Galaxy	2–0	Montreal Impact	Carson, California
19:30	Alessandrini 15'; João Pedro (yellow card) 54'; Jones 74'	Report	Donadel (red card) 44'; Tabla (yellow card) 64'	Stadium: StubHub Center; Attendance: 19,058; Referee: Armando Villarreal

April 15 6	Orlando City SC	2–1	LA Galaxy	Orlando, Florida
12:00	Johnson 9'; Larin 90+1'	Report	Van Damme (yellow card) 52'; João Pedro (yellow card) 64'; Alessandrini 83'	Stadium: Orlando City Stadium; Attendance: 25,527; Referee: Chris Penso

April 23 7	LA Galaxy	0–3	Seattle Sounders FC	Carson, California
13:00	Alessandrini (yellow card) 41'	Report	Roldan (yellow card) 28'; Dempsey 29'; Cole 35' (o.g.); Morris 44'; Alfaro (yellow card) 84'	Stadium: StubHub Center; Attendance: 24,931; Referee: Ismail Elfath

April 29 8	LA Galaxy	0–0	Philadelphia Union	Carson, California
19:30	Van Damme (yellow card) 44'; Diallo (yellow card) 90+3'	Report		Stadium: StubHub Center; Attendance: 25,008; Referee: Alan Kelly

May 6 9	LA Galaxy	2–2	Chicago Fire	Carson, California
19:30	Steres 56'; Giovani 65'; Alessandrini (yellow card) 74'	Report	Accam 13' (pen.); Nikolić 16'; Vincent (yellow card) 60'; Schweinsteiger (yellow card) 90'	Stadium: StubHub Center; Attendance: 24,256; Referee: Kevin Stott

May 14 10	New York Red Bulls	1–3	LA Galaxy	Harrison, New Jersey
15:00	Long (yellow card) 45+1'; Kljestan (yellow card) 55'; Royer 90+3'	Report	Alessandrini 8', 9'; Diallo (yellow card) 27' (yellow-red card) 90'; Giovani 78' (pen.); McBean (yellow card) 84'	Stadium: Red Bull Arena; Attendance: 18,376; Referee: Jose Carlos Rivero

May 21 11	Minnesota United FC	1–2	LA Galaxy	Minneapolis, Minnesota
14:00	Ramirez 66'; Ibarra (yellow card) 74'	Report	Giovani 38', (yellow card) 90+3'; Van Damme (yellow card) 45+2'; Steres (yellow card) 73'; Alessandrini (yellow card) 79'; Ramirez 84' (o.g.)	Stadium: TCF Bank Stadium; Attendance: 19,107; Referee: Chris Penso

May 27 12	San Jose Earthquakes	2–4	LA Galaxy	San Jose, California
19:00	Wondolowski 10', (yellow card) 69'; Hoesen 37'	Report	João Pedro 19'; Giovani 35' (pen.), 64'; Bernárdez 44' (o.g.); Diallo (yellow card) 66'; McInerney (yellow card) 90+4'	Stadium: Avaya Stadium; Attendance: 18,000; Referee: Ricardo Salazar

June 3 13	D.C. United	0–0	LA Galaxy	Washington, D.C.
16:00	Sam (yellow card) 37'	Report	Van Damme (yellow card) 35'	Stadium: Robert F. Kennedy Memorial Stadium; Attendance: 17,730; Referee: Drew Fischer

June 17 14	LA Galaxy	2–2	Houston Dynamo	Carson, California
20:00	Boateng 35'; Alessandrini 90+4'; Smith (yellow card) 90+7'	Report	Manotas 22', (yellow card) 73'; Elis (yellow card) 58', (goal) 74'; Leonardo (yellow card) 69'; DeLaGarza (yellow card) 90+1'	Stadium: StubHub Center; Attendance: 25,667; Referee: Hilario Grajeda

June 21 15	Colorado Rapids	1–3	LA Galaxy	Commerce City, Colorado
18:00	da Fonte (yellow card) 24'; Serna 37'	Report	McBean 5', 63'; Smith (yellow card) 29'; João Pedro (yellow card) 34'; Alessandrini 71' (pen.)	Stadium: Dick's Sporting Goods Park; Attendance: 13,496; Referee: Chris Penso

June 24 16	LA Galaxy	1–2	Sporting Kansas City	Carson, California
19:30	Ja. Villarreal (yellow card) 33'; Smith (yellow card) 59'; Romney 77'; Van Damme (yellow card) 81'	Report	Espinoza 22'; Opara 35'; Fernandes (yellow card) 73'	Stadium: StubHub Center; Attendance: 20,140; Referee: Baldomero Toledo

July 1 17	San Jose Earthquakes	2–1	LA Galaxy	San Jose, California
19:00	Wondolowski 75'; Salinas 90+3', (yellow card) 90+4'	Report	Van Damme 11', (yellow card) 84' (yellow-red card) 90+5'; João Pedro (yellow card) 90'	Stadium: Stanford Stadium; Attendance: 50,617; Referee: Allen Chapman

July 4 18	LA Galaxy	2–6	Real Salt Lake	Carson, California
19:30	Cole 41'; Jamieson IV 89'	Report	Phillips (yellow card) 26'; Rusnák 36'; Beckerman 45+1'; Movsisyan 62'; Savarino 72', 77'; Plata 80'	Stadium: StubHub Center; Attendance: 25,667; Referee: Kevin Stott

July 19 19	LA Galaxy	0–1	Vancouver Whitecaps FC	Carson, California
19:30	Tchani (yellow card) 23', (goal) 64'	Report	João Pedro (yellow card) 90+2'	Stadium: StubHub Center; Attendance: 17,404; Referee: Ricardo Salazar

July 22 20	New England Revolution	4–3	LA Galaxy	Foxborough, Massachusetts
16:30	Nguyen 16'; Kamara 34'; Farrell (yellow card) 38'; Delamea (yellow card) 56'; Tierney (yellow card) 66'; Fagúndez (yellow card) 69'; Bunbury 70', 73'	Report	Steres 22', 53'; Jones (yellow card) 24'; Diallo (yellow card) 42'; McBean (yellow card) 44'; Lassiter 79'	Stadium: Gillette Stadium; Attendance: 27,441; Referee: Jorge Gonzalez

July 29 21	LA Galaxy	0–0	Seattle Sounders FC	Carson, California
19:00	Jones (yellow card) 42'; Van Damme (yellow card) 45+1' (yellow-red card) 86'; Diallo (yellow card) 80'; Alessandrini (yellow card) 85'	Report	Jones (yellow card) 83'	Stadium: StubHub Center; Attendance: 25,667; Referee: Armando Villarreal

August 6 22	Portland Timbers	3–1	LA Galaxy	Portland, Oregon
11:00	Ridgewell 5', (yellow card) 58'; Powell (yellow card) 10', (goal) 53'; Valeri 33'; Miller (yellow card) 80'; Guzmán (yellow card) 90+8'	Report	Boateng 6'; Zardes (yellow card) 13'; João Pedro (yellow card) 45+1'; Jonathan (yellow card) 71'; Jones (yellow card) 72'	Stadium: Providence Park; Attendance: 21,144; Referee: Drew Fischer

August 12 23	LA Galaxy	0–2	New York City FC	Carson, California
20:00	Jones (yellow card) 34'	Report	Callens (yellow card) 36'; Ring (yellow card) 45'; Lewis 54'; Villa 73'; White (yellow card) 80'; Wallace (yellow card) 85'	Stadium: StubHub Center; Attendance: 25,667; Referee: Robert Sibiga

August 23 24	Columbus Crew SC	2–0	LA Galaxy	Columbus, Ohio
16:30	Kamara 45'; Trapp (yellow card) 56'; Pedro Santos (yellow card) 59'; Martínez (yellow card) 81'; Meram 90'	Report	Cole (red card) 18'; Jonathan (yellow card) 35'	Stadium: Mapfre Stadium; Attendance: 12,150; Referee: Sorin Stoica

August 27 25	LA Galaxy	0–3	San Jose Earthquakes	Carson, California
16:00	Diallo (yellow card) 45'; Smith (red card) 57'	Report	Alashe (yellow card) 20'; Qazaishvili 45+3'; Ureña 80'; Hoesen (yellow card) 87'; Wondolowski 90+2'	Stadium: StubHub Center; Attendance: 19,237; Referee: Chris Penso

September 2 26	LA Galaxy	3–0	Colorado Rapids	Carson, California
20:00	Alessandrini 18' (pen.); Boateng 23'; Zardes 56'	Report		Stadium: StubHub Center; Attendance: 17,683; Referee: Jair Marrufo

September 10 27	Seattle Sounders FC	1–1	LA Galaxy	Seattle, Washington
18:00	Fisher (yellow card) 73'; Alonso (yellow card) 75'; Neagle 85'; Torres (red card) 89'	Report	Zardes 25', (yellow card) 81'; Jones (yellow card) 33'; Diallo (yellow card) 42'; Alessandrini (yellow card) 55'; Giovani (yellow card) 80'	Stadium: CenturyLink Field; Attendance: 44,697; Referee: Drew Fischer

September 16 28	LA Galaxy	0–4	Toronto FC	Carson, California
19:30	Jamieson IV (yellow card) 29'; Smith (yellow card) 80'	Report	Moor 24'; Ricketts 37', 76'; Vázquez 78'	Stadium: StubHub Center; Attendance: 19,650; Referee: Kevin Stott

September 20 29	Atlanta United FC	4–0	LA Galaxy	Atlanta, Georgia
16:00	Martínez 13'; Asad 16', 20'; Villalba (yellow card) 39'; Almirón 43'; Pírez (yellow card) 45+2'; Vazquez (red card) 82'	Report	Jones (red card) 39'; Alessandrini (yellow card) 58'	Stadium: Mercedes-Benz Stadium; Attendance: 42,723; Referee: Ricardo Salazar

September 24 30	Sporting Kansas City	2–1	LA Galaxy	Kansas City, Kansas
11:00	Sallói 18'; Rubio 35'	Report	Jonathan (yellow card) 1'; Ciani (yellow card) 55'; Alessandrini 58'; McBean (yellow card) 90+2'	Stadium: Children's Mercy Park; Attendance: 19,028; Referee: Mark Geiger

September 27 31	Houston Dynamo	3–3	LA Galaxy	Houston, Texas
17:30	Cabezas (yellow card) 24'; Martínez 26', (yellow card) 61'; Elis 84' (pen.), 88'	Report	Beasley 3' (o.g.); Alessandrini 12'; Arellano (yellow card) 31'; Jamieson IV 47'; Diop (yellow card) 57'; Jonathan (yellow card) 61'; Giovani (yellow card) 71'; Jones (yellow card) 90+2'	Stadium: BBVA Compass Stadium; Attendance: 16,062; Referee: Fotis Bazakos

September 30 32	LA Galaxy	1–1	Real Salt Lake	Carson, California
19:30	Zardes (yellow card) 32'; Jamieson IV 41', (yellow card) 48'; Alessandrini (yellow card) 85'	Report	M. Silva (red card) 14'; Horst (yellow card) 81'; Beckerman 90+5'	Stadium: StubHub Center; Attendance: 20,234; Referee: Rubiel Vazquez

October 15 33	LA Galaxy	3–0	Minnesota United FC	Carson, California
16:30	Alessandrini 11', 90+3'; Jonathan 22'; Ciani (yellow card) 83'	Report	Thiesson (yellow card) 44'; Warner (yellow card) 77'	Stadium: StubHub Center; Attendance: 23,377; Referee: Alex Chilowicz

October 22 34	FC Dallas	5–1	LA Galaxy	Frisco, Texas
13:00	Lamah 37', 49'; Hedges 41'; Barrios 68'; Díaz 73' (pen.); Acosta (yellow card) 84'	Report	Ciani 2', (yellow card) 65'; Diop (red card) 71'	Stadium: Toyota Stadium; Attendance: 15,383; Referee: José Carlos Rivero

=== U.S. Open Cup ===
==== Fourth round ====
The pairing for the fourth round was announced on May 18, 2017.

June 14	LA Galaxy (California)	3–1	(California) Orange County SC	Carson, California
19:30 PT	Villareal 17'; McBean 36' (pen.); Lassiter 73'	Report	Meeus 26'; Sorto (yellow card) 31'; Stevanovic (yellow card) 38' van Ewijk (yellow card) 81'	Stadium: StubHub Center; Attendance: 2,408; Referee: Ramy Touchan

==== Round of 16 ====
The draw for this round was held on June 15, 2017.

June 28	LA Galaxy (California)	2–0	(California) Sacramento Republic FC	Carson, California
19:30 PT	Smith (yellow card) 44'; Lassiter 47'; Jamieson IV 49'	Report	Christian (yellow card) 45+1'; Kiffe (yellow card) 67'	Stadium: StubHub Center; Attendance: 2,195; Referee: Alejandro Mariscal

==== Quarterfinal ====
July 10	San Jose Earthquakes (California)	3–2	(California) LA Galaxy	San Jose, California
19:15 PT	Wondolowski 16', 51'; Hoesen 62'; Sarkodie (yellow card) 90+2'	Report	Van Damme 3'; Ja. Villarreal (yellow card) 28'; McBean (yellow card) 64'; Garcia (yellow card) 70'; Tarbell 84' (o.g.)	Stadium: Avaya Stadium; Attendance: 14,056; Referee: Allen Chapman

== Player statistics ==
=== Top scorers ===
Place	Position	Number	Name	MLS	MLS Cup	Open Cup	Total
1	MF	7	(France) Romain Alessandrini	13	0	0	13
2	FW	10	(Mexico) Giovani dos Santos	6	0	0	6
3	FW	24	(Ghana) Emmanuel Boateng	4	0	0	4
3	FW	38	(United States) Bradford Jamieson IV	3	0	1	4
4	FW	5	(United States) Daniel Steres	3	0	0	3
4	FW	32	(United States) Jack McBean	2	0	1	3
4	FW	32	(Costa Rica) Ariel Lassiter	1	0	2	3
5	FW	11	(United States) Gyasi Zardes	2	0	0	2
5	DF	4	(United States) David Romney	2	0	0	2
5	DF	37	(Belgium) Jelle Van Damme	1	0	1	2
6	MF	13	(United States) Jermaine Jones	1	0	0	1
6	DF	3	(England) Ashley Cole	1	0	0	1
6	MF	88	(Portugal) João Pedro	1	0	0	1
6	FW	33	(United States) Jose Villarreal	0	0	1	1
6	MF	8	(Mexico) Jonathan dos Santos	1	0	0	1
6	DF	28	(France) Michaël Ciani	1	0	0	1
Total				42	0	6	48

As of October 22.

== See also ==
- 2017 in American soccer
- 2017 LA Galaxy II season
