= 2016 LA Galaxy season =

American soccer club season

LA Galaxy
2016 season
- Owner: Philip Anschutz (AEG)
- Coach: Bruce Arena
- Stadium: StubHub Center
- MLS: Conference: 3rd Overall: 6th
- U.S. Open Cup: Semifinal
- CONCACAF Champions League (15–16): Quarterfinals
- MLS Cup Playoffs: Conference Semifinal
- Top goalscorer: League: Giovani dos Santos (15 goals); All: Giovani dos Santos (16 goals)
- Highest home attendance: 27,167 (Four times)
- Lowest home attendance: 3,409 (vs. Seattle Sounders FC – July 20)
- Average home league attendance: 21,883
Home colors	Away colors

The 2016 LA Galaxy season was the club's twenty-first season of existence, their twenty-first in Major League Soccer and their twenty-first consecutive season in the top flight of American soccer.

The Galaxy finished the MLS regular season third in the Western Conference, but were knocked out by the Colorado Rapids in the Conference Semifinals of the 2016 MLS Cup Playoffs. They also continued their campaign in the 2015–16 CONCACAF Champions League, reaching the quarterfinals before losing to Santos Laguna. The team also reached the semifinals of the U.S. Open Cup before being knocked out by FC Dallas.

On September 8, Landon Donovan came out of retirement and signed with the Galaxy, his former club.

The team drew 427,492 fans to 17 home games during the regular season for an average of 25,147 per match. This would be the second-highest attendance achieved at the StubHub Center, behind only 2008, and would remain as such until 2024, their next MLS Cup-winning season.

== Players ==
=== Squad information ===
Players at the end of the season. Note: Flags indicate national team as defined under FIFA eligibility rules; some limited exceptions apply. Players may hold more than one non-FIFA nationality.

No.	Pos.	Nation	Player
1	GK	USA	Dan Kennedy
3	DF	ENG	Ashley Cole
5	MF	USA	Jose Villarreal (HGP)
6	MF	BIH	Baggio Husidić
7	FW	IRL	Robbie Keane (DP & Captain)
8	MF	ENG	Steven Gerrard (DP)
9	FW	USA	Alan Gordon
10	FW	MEX	Giovani dos Santos (DP)
11	FW	USA	Gyasi Zardes (HGP)
12	GK	USA	Brian Rowe
14	DF	USA	Robbie Rogers
15	FW	CRC	Ariel Lassiter
18	FW	USA	Mike Magee
17	MF	USA	Sebastian Lletget
20	DF	GUM	A. J. DeLaGarza
21	MF	USA	Jeff Larentowicz
22	DF	BRA	Leonardo
24	FW	GHA	Emmanuel Boateng
25	MF	USA	Rafael Garcia
26	FW	USA	Landon Donovan
27	DF	USA	Dave Romney
31	GK	FRA	Clément Diop
34	MF	NED	Nigel de Jong
36	DF	USA	Oscar Sorto (HGP)
37	DF	BEL	Jelle Van Damme
38	FW	USA	Bradford Jamieson IV (HGP)
40	MF	MEX	Raúl Mendiola (HGP)
44	DF	USA	Daniel Steres

=== Transfers ===
==== Transfers in ====
Pos.	Player	Transferred from	Fee/notes	Date	Source
GK	(United States) Dan Kennedy	(United States) FC Dallas	Acquired in exchange for the second and third round selections in the 2017 MLS SuperDraft.	December 15, 2015	
GK	(France) Clément Diop	(United States) LA Galaxy II	Sign	December 16, 2015	
DF	(United States) Daniel Steres	(United States) LA Galaxy II	Sign	December 17, 2015	
MF	(United States) Jeff Larentowicz	(United States) Chicago Fire	Free agent	January 6, 2016	
FW	(United States) Mike Magee	(United States) Chicago Fire	Free agent	January 14, 2016	
FW	(Ghana) Emmanuel Boateng	(Sweden) Helsingborgs IF	Sign	January 14, 2016	
DF	(United States) Josh Turnley	(United States) Georgetown Hoyas (United States) D.C. United U-23	Selected in the 2016 MLS SuperDraft with the 42nd pick.	January 19, 2016	
DF	(Belgium) Jelle Van Damme	(Belgium) Standard Liège	Sign	January 26, 2016	
DF	(England) Ashley Cole	(Italy) Roma	Sign	January 27, 2016	
MF	(Netherlands) Nigel de Jong	(Italy) Milan	Sign	February 3, 2016	
FW	(Costa Rica) Ariel Lassiter	(United States) LA Galaxy II	Sign	March 5, 2016	
FW	(United States) Jack McBean	(United States) LA Galaxy II	Sign	June 22, 2016	
FW	(United States) Landon Donovan		Sign. Returning from retirement.	September 8, 2016	

==== Transfers out ====
Pos.	Player	Transferred to	Fee/notes	Date	Source
DF	(United States) Todd Dunivant	None	Retired	October 29, 2015	
MF	(Finland) Mika Väyrynen		Option declined	November 20, 2015	
FW	(United States) Edson Buddle		Option declined	December 7, 2015	
DF	(United States) Tommy Meyer	Later he signed with the (United States) Swope Park Rangers.	Option declined	December 7, 2015	
GK	(United States) Brian Perk		Option declined	December 7, 2015	
GK	(Jamaica) Donovan Ricketts		Option declined	December 7, 2015	
FW	(United States) Charlie Rugg		Option declined	December 7, 2015	
MF	(United States) Kenney Walker	(United States) FC Cincinnati	Option declined	December 7, 2015	
GK	(United States) Andrew Wolverton		Option declined	December 7, 2015	
DF	(United States) Omar Gonzalez	(Mexico) Pachuca	Undisclosed fee	December 22, 2015	
MF	(Brazil) Juninho	(Mexico) Tijuana	Undisclosed fee	December 24, 2015	
DF	(United States) Dan Gargan		Waived	February 29, 2016	
FW	(Spain) Ignacio Maganto		Waived	February 29, 2016	
DF	(United States) Josh Turnley	(United States) LA Galaxy II	Sign	March 21, 2016	
FW	(United States) Jack McBean	(England) Coventry City	Loan	August 19, 2016	
MF	(Netherlands) Nigel de Jong	(Turkey) Galatasaray	Contract mutually terminated	August 31, 2016	

== Competitions ==
=== Preseason ===
The first preseason match was announced on November 23, 2015.

January 30	LA Galaxy	2–1	FC Shirak	Carson, California
19:00 PT	Villarreal 54', 80'; Maganto (yellow card) 90'	Report	Ayvazywan 75'; Kouakou (yellow card) 76'	Stadium: StubHub Center

February 6	LA Galaxy	2–3	Toronto FC	Carson, California
PT	Keane 4'; Rogers 41'	Report	Giovinco 2', 45'; Babouli 52'	Stadium: StubHub Center Complex

February 9	LA Galaxy	0–0	Tijuana	Carson, California
19:00 PT	Van Damme (yellow card) 37'	Report	Jiménez (yellow card) 57'	Stadium: StubHub Center; Attendance: 14,543; Referee: Jose Carlos Rivero

February 13	LA Galaxy	1–0	San Jose Earthquakes	Las Vegas, Nevada
19:00 PT	Zardes 27'	Report		Stadium: Cashman Field

February 17	LA Galaxy	0–4	Seattle Sounders FC	Carson, California
19:00 PT		Report	Ivanschitz 22', 57'; Marshall 27'; Dempsey 47'	Stadium: StubHub Center

=== Major League Soccer ===
==== Standings ====
===== Overall =====
Pos	Team	Pld	W	L	T	GF	GA	GD	Pts	Qualification
4	New York City FC	34	15	10	9	62	57	+5	54	
5	Toronto FC	34	14	9	11	51	39	+12	53	CONCACAF Champions League
6	LA Galaxy	34	12	6	16	54	39	+15	52	
7	Seattle Sounders FC (C)	34	14	14	6	44	43	+1	48	CONCACAF Champions League
8	Sporting Kansas City	34	13	13	8	42	41	+1	47	

Source: MLS
Rules for classification: 1) points; 2) total wins; 3) total goal differential; 4) total goals scored;
(C) MLS Cup Champion

===== Western Conference =====
Pos	Team	Pld	W	L	T	GF	GA	GD	Pts	Qualification
1	FC Dallas	34	17	8	9	50	40	+10	60	MLS Cup Conference Semifinals
2	Colorado Rapids	34	15	6	13	39	32	+7	58	MLS Cup Conference Semifinals
3	LA Galaxy	34	12	6	16	54	39	+15	52	MLS Cup Knockout Round
4	Seattle Sounders FC	34	14	14	6	44	43	+1	48	MLS Cup Knockout Round
5	Sporting Kansas City	34	13	13	8	42	41	+1	47	MLS Cup Knockout Round

Source: MLS

==== Regular season ====
March 6 1	LA Galaxy	4–1	D.C. United	Carson, California
19:00 PT	Steres 54'; Magee 64', 87'; Keane 83' (pen.)	Report	Neagle 5', (yellow card) 48'; Franklin (yellow card) 59'; DeLeon (yellow card) 86'	Stadium: StubHub Center; Attendance: 25,667; Referee: Kevin Stott

March 12 2	Colorado Rapids	1–0	LA Galaxy	Commerce City, Colorado
16:00 PT	Burch (yellow card) 45'; Watts (yellow card) 89'; Doyle (yellow card) 90+1'; Pappa 90+5'	Report	Gerrard (yellow card) 43'; Steres (yellow card) 50'; Van Damme (yellow card) 72'; Boateng (yellow card) 82'	Stadium: Dick's Sporting Goods Park; Attendance: 17,474; Referee: Fotis Bazakos

March 19 3	LA Galaxy	3–1	San Jose Earthquakes	Carson, California
19:30 PDT	Magee (yellow card) 11'; Van Damme (yellow card) 21' de Jong (yellow card) 22'; Zardes 56', 62'; Keane 90+1' (pen.); Gordon (yellow card) 90+3'	Report	Imperiale (yellow card) 41'; Dawkins (red card) 45+3'; Alashe (yellow card) 52'; Wynne (yellow card) 56'; Wondolowski 89'	Stadium: StubHub Center; Attendance: 25,667; Referee: Ismail Elfath

April 2 4	Vancouver Whitecaps FC	0–0	LA Galaxy	Vancouver, British Columbia
19:00 PDT	Laba (red card) 28'	Report	Steres (yellow card) 17'; Van Damme (yellow card) 24'	Stadium: BC Place; Attendance: 27,038; Referee: Jair Marrufo

April 10 5	LA Galaxy	1–1	Portland Timbers	Carson, California
18:30 PDT	de Jong (yellow card) 73'; Borchers 84' (o.g.)	Report	Borchers (yellow card) 17'; Adi 52'; Grabavoy (yellow card) 88'; Chará (yellow card) 90+2'	Stadium: StubHub Center; Attendance: 25,667; Referee: Allen Chapman

April 15 6	Houston Dynamo	1–4	LA Galaxy	Houston, Texas
16:00 PDT	Horst 1'	Report	Giovani 4', 31'; Husidić 21'; Zardes 49'; Cole (yellow card) 56'; Steres (yellow card) 89'	Stadium: BBVA Compass Stadium; Attendance: 20,563; Referee: Mark Geiger

April 23 7	LA Galaxy	5–2	Real Salt Lake	Carson, California
19:30 PDT	Zardes 19', (yellow card) 38'; Magee 26'; Boateng 41'; Giovani 45'; Van Damme (yellow card) 67'; Gerrard 90+1'	Report	Beckerman (yellow card) 13'; Martínez 16'; Beltran (yellow card) 57'; Olave (yellow card) 60'; Morales 70' (pen.)	Stadium: StubHub Center; Attendance: 25,867; Referee: Edvin Jurisevic

May 1 8	Sporting Kansas City	1–1	LA Galaxy	Kansas City, Kansas
17:00 PDT	Davis 30'; Opara (yellow card) 82'	Report	Giovani 42'; Cole (yellow card) 69' (yellow-red card) 70'; Villarreal (yellow card) 90+4'	Stadium: Children's Mercy Park; Attendance: 19,431; Referee: Chris Penso

May 8 9	LA Galaxy	4–2	New England Revolution	Carson, California
12:30 PDT	Keane 13', 45+1'; Giovani 24'; DeLaGarza (yellow card) 90+1'; Gerrard 90+3'	Report	Watson (yellow card) 58'; Rowe 67'; Agudelo 70'	Stadium: StubHub Center; Attendance: 21,237; Referee: Hilario Grajeda

May 11 10	Philadelphia Union	2–2	LA Galaxy	Chester, Pennsylvania
16:00 PDT	Nogueira 4'; Rosenberry 63'	Report	Rogers 15', (yellow card) 70'; Magee 47'; Kennedy (yellow card) 82'	Stadium: Talen Energy Stadium; Attendance: 17,985; Referee: Sorin Stoica

May 22 11	LA Galaxy	1–1	San Jose Earthquakes	Carson, California
16:00 PDT	Wynne 83' (o.g.)	Report	Quintero (yellow card) 23'; Alashe 87'	Stadium: StubHub Center; Attendance: 27,167; Referee: Kevin Stott

May 28 12	Montreal Impact	3–2	LA Galaxy	Montreal, Quebec
15:00 PDT	Piatti 26'; Ontivero 56'; Bernier (yellow card) 68'; Drogba 90+4', (yellow card) 90+5'	Report	Giovani 8'; Magee 58'; Gordon (yellow card) 90+2'; Steres (yellow card) 90+4'	Stadium: Saputo Stadium; Attendance: 20,801; Referee: Baldomero Toledo

June 2 13	LA Galaxy	0–0	Sporting Kansas City	Carson, California
19:30 PDT	Larentowicz (yellow card) 39'; Steres (yellow card) 49'	Report	Dwyer (yellow card) 51'	Stadium: StubHub Center; Attendance: 19,651; Referee: Hilario Grajeda

June 18 14	Toronto FC	1–0	LA Galaxy	Toronto, Ontario
16:30 PDT	Moor 76'	Report	DeLaGarza (yellow card) 28'	Stadium: BMO Field; Attendance: 30,025; Referee: Ricardo Salazar

June 22 15	LA Galaxy	0–0	Colorado Rapids	Carson, California
19:30 PDT	DeLaGarza (yellow card) 82'; Van Damme (yellow card) 82'	Report	Sjöberg (yellow card) 15'; Castillo (yellow card) 50'; Azira (yellow card) 75'	Stadium: StubHub Center; Attendance: 21,884; Referee: Chris Penso

June 25 16	San Jose Earthquakes	1–1	LA Galaxy	Santa Clara, California
19:00 PDT	Barrett 90'	Report	Van Damme (yellow card) 45+1'; Giovani 69', (yellow card) 89'; Cole (yellow card) 90+6' (yellow-red card)	Stadium: Stanford Stadium; Attendance: 50,816; Referee: Kevin Stott

July 4 17	LA Galaxy	2–0	Vancouver Whitecaps FC	Carson, California
19:30 PDT	Keane 12'; Larentowicz 47' de Jong (red card) 74'	Report	Laba (yellow card) 67'	Stadium: StubHub Center; Attendance: 27,167; Referee: Robert Sibiga

July 9 18	Seattle Sounders FC	0–1	LA Galaxy	Seattle, Washington
12:00 PDT		Report	Keane 15'; Romney (yellow card) 69'	Stadium: CenturyLink Field; Attendance: 40,813; Referee: Baldomero Toledo

July 15 19	LA Galaxy	1–0	Houston Dynamo	Carson, California
20:00 PDT	Giovani (yellow card) 55'; Larentowicz (yellow card) 64'; Gerrard 66'	Report	Warner (yellow card) 24'	Stadium: StubHub Center; Attendance: 25,667; Referee: Mark Geiger

July 23 20	Portland Timbers	1–2	LA Galaxy	Portland, Oregon
12:30 PDT	Valentin 41'	Report	Keane 7'; Zardes 11'	Stadium: Providence Park; Attendance: 21,144; Referee: Alan Kelly

July 31 21	Seattle Sounders FC	1–1	LA Galaxy	Seattle, Washington
13:00 PDT	Roldan 49'	Report	Van Damme (yellow card) 65'; Lletget 78'	Stadium: CenturyLink Field; Attendance: 48,458; Referee: Drew Fischer

August 7 22	LA Galaxy	2–2	New York Red Bulls	Carson, California
18:30 PDT	Magee 80'; Cole 89'; Hušidić (yellow card) 90+3'	Report	Muyl (yellow card) 61'; Verón 68'; Davis 74'; Lawrence (yellow card) 90+2'	Stadium: StubHub Center; Attendance: 25,671; Referee: Hilario Grajeda

August 13 23	LA Galaxy	1–1	Colorado Rapids	Carson, California
19:30 PDT	Steres 62' de Jong (yellow card) 86'	Report	Gashi 51'; Azira (yellow card) 87'	Stadium: StubHub Center; Attendance: 25,667; Referee: Juan Guzman

August 20 24	New York City FC	1–0	LA Galaxy	New York City, New York
12:30 PDT	Villa 6'	Report	DeLaGarza (yellow card) 90+3'	Stadium: Yankee Stadium; Attendance: 35,509; Referee: Jair Marrufo

August 24 25	Chicago Fire	2–2	LA Galaxy	Bridgeview, Illinois
17:30 PDT	Álvarez 34'; Accam 39' (pen.), (yellow card) 90+3'	Report	Zardes 31'; Van Damme (yellow card) 38'; Giovani 69'; Lletget (yellow card) 71'; Hušidić (yellow card) 76'	Stadium: Toyota Park; Attendance: 16,179; Referee: Jose Carlos Rivero

August 27 26	LA Galaxy	0–0	Vancouver Whitecaps FC	Carson, California
19:30 PDT	Rogers (yellow card) 53'	Report	Aird (yellow card) 27'	Stadium: StubHub Center; Attendance: 25,667; Referee: Alan Kelly

September 3 27	LA Galaxy	2–1	Columbus Crew SC	Carson, California
19:30 PDT	Hušidić 78'; Giovani 82'	Report	Jahn 90+2'	Stadium: StubHub Center; Attendance: 24,693; Referee: Kevin Stott

September 7 28	Real Salt Lake	3–3	LA Galaxy	Sandy, Utah
18:30 PDT	Wingert (yellow card) 2'; Beckerman (yellow card) 17'; Olave (yellow card) 27'; Plata 53' (pen.), 67'; Mulholland (yellow card) 62'; Martínez 90+4'	Report	Boateng 6'; Larentowicz (yellow card) 25'; Giovani 57', 64', (yellow card) 90+5'	Stadium: Rio Tinto Stadium; Attendance: 20,266; Referee: Chris Penso

September 11 29	LA Galaxy	4–2	Orlando City SC	Carson, California
16:00 PDT	Giovani 35', 45' (pen.); Gordon 38'; Garcia (yellow card) 45+2'; Cole (yellow card) 55'; Keane 70'; Mendiola (yellow card) 75'	Report	Molino 20'; Rocha (yellow card) 48'; Mateos (yellow card) 60'; Shea 90+2'	Stadium: StubHub Center; Attendance: 27,167; Referee: Ismail Elfath

September 18 30	Sporting Kansas City	2–2	LA Galaxy	Kansas City, Kansas
10:00 PDT	Peterson 50'; Dwyer 69'	Report	Gordon 7'; Larentowicz (yellow card) 44'; Donovan 76'	Stadium: Children's Mercy Park; Attendance: 19,480; Referee: Ricardo Salazar

September 25 31	LA Galaxy	2–4	Seattle Sounders FC	Carson, California
13:00 PDT	Keane 20', 85' (pen.), (yellow card) 59'	Report	Van Damme 35' (o.g.); Morris 63', 73'; Valdez (yellow card) 66'; Alonso 78'; Lodeiro (yellow card) 81'; Torres (yellow card) 86'	Stadium: StubHub Center; Attendance: 25,819; Referee: Armando Villarreal

October 1 32	FC Dallas	1–0	LA Galaxy	Frisco, Texas
18:00 PDT	Zimmerman 39'; Acosta (yellow card) 71'; Figueroa (yellow card) 90'	Report	DeLaGarza (yellow card) 12'; Van Damme (yellow card) 87'	Stadium: Toyota Stadium; Attendance: 15,968; Referee: Drew Fischer

October 16 33	Houston Dynamo	0–1	LA Galaxy	Houston, Texas
16:00 PDT		Report	Gordon 72'	Stadium: BBVA Compass Stadium; Attendance: 21,085; Referee: Kevin Stott

October 23 34	LA Galaxy	0–0	FC Dallas	Carson, California
13:00 PDT	Donovan (yellow card) 31'	Report	Akindele (yellow card) 39'; Gruezo (yellow card) 47'; Rosales (yellow card) 90+2'	Stadium: StubHub Center; Attendance: 27,167; Referee: Chris Penso

==== Playoffs ====
===== Knockout round =====
October 26 Knockout round	LA Galaxy	3–1	Real Salt Lake	Carson, California
19:30 PT	Gordon 14'; Boateng 26', 34'; Hušidić (yellow card) 62'	Report	Plata 21' (pen.); Phillips (yellow card) 39'; Wingert (yellow card) 41'; Sunny (yellow card) 71'	Stadium: StubHub Center; Attendance: 18,124; Referee: Alan Kelly

===== Conference semifinals =====
October 30 First leg	LA Galaxy	1–0	Colorado Rapids	Carson, California
14:00 PT	Van Damme (yellow card) 45'; Giovani 55'; Cole (yellow card) 67'	Report	Badji (yellow card) 12'; Watts (yellow card) 50'; Jones (yellow card) 60'	Stadium: StubHub Center; Attendance: 24,487; Referee: Drew Fischer

November 6 Second leg	Colorado Rapids	1–0 (a.e.t.) (1–1 agg.) (3–1 p)	LA Galaxy	Commerce City, Colorado
11:00 PT	Gashi (yellow card) 30', (goal) 36'; Cronin (yellow card) 57'	Report		Stadium: Dick's Sporting Goods Park; Attendance: 17,782; Referee: Mark Geiger
	Penalties
	Doyle (penalty scored); Le Toux (penalty scored); Pappa (penalty scored)		(penalty scored) Gerrard; (penalty missed) Giovani; (penalty missed) Cole; (penalty missed) Larentowicz

=== U.S. Open Cup ===
==== Fourth round ====
June 14 Fourth round	LA Galaxy	4–1 (a.e.t.)	La Máquina FC	Carson, California
19:30 PT	Villarreal 15'; Garcia (red card) 17'; DeLaGarza (yellow card) 78'; McBean (yellow card) 88'; Romney 96'; Lletget 105' (pen.), 115'	Report	Pineda (yellow card) 23'; Borboa 28'; Sosa (yellow card) 67'; Orozco (yellow card) 88'; Pinedo (yellow card) 90'	Stadium: StubHub Center; Attendance: 4,752; Referee: Ramon Hernandez

==== Fifth round ====
June 29 Fifth round	Portland Timbers	0–1	LA Galaxy	Portland, Oregon
19:30 PT	Jewsbury (yellow card) 78'	Report	Mendiola 5'; Larentowicz (yellow card) 57'	Stadium: Providence Park; Attendance: 18,164; Referee: Edvin Jurisevic

==== Quarterfinal ====
July 20 Quarterfinal	LA Galaxy	4–2	Seattle Sounders FC	Carson, California
22:30 ET	Gordon 17'; Leonardo (yellow card) 31'; Giovani 77'; Lletget 85', 88'	Report	Farfan 4'; Remick (yellow card) 32'; Alfaro (yellow card) 57'; Gomez 58'	Stadium: StubHub Center; Attendance: 3,409; Referee: Alex Chilowicz

==== Semifinal ====
August 10 Semifinal	LA Galaxy	1–2 (a.e.t.)	FC Dallas	Carson, California
19:00 PT	Garcia (yellow card) 80'; Magee 101' (pen.)	Report	Harris (yellow card) 26'; Ulloa (yellow card) 53', (goal) 120+1'; Figueroa (yellow card) 75'; Gruezo (yellow card) 86'; Barrios (yellow card) 112'; Hedges 116'	Stadium: StubHub Center; Attendance: 6,120; Referee: Ted Unkel

=== CONCACAF Champions League ===
==== Quarterfinals ====
February 24 First leg	LA Galaxy (United States)	0–0	(Mexico) Santos Laguna	Carson, United States
22:00 ET	Van Damme (yellow card) 39'; Giovani (yellow card) 62'; Gerrard (yellow card) 82'	Report	González (yellow card) 34'	Stadium: StubHub Center; Attendance: 18,922; Referee: Armando Castro (Honduras)

March 1 Second leg	Santos Laguna (Mexico)	4–0 (4–0 agg.)	(United States) LA Galaxy	Torreón, Mexico
22:00 ET	Bravo 19', 61'; Dávila 23'; Djaniny 36'	Report		Stadium: Estadio Corona; Referee: Marlon Mejía (El Salvador)

== See also ==
- 2016 in American soccer
- 2016 LA Galaxy II season
