= Brian Rowe =

American soccer player (born 1988)

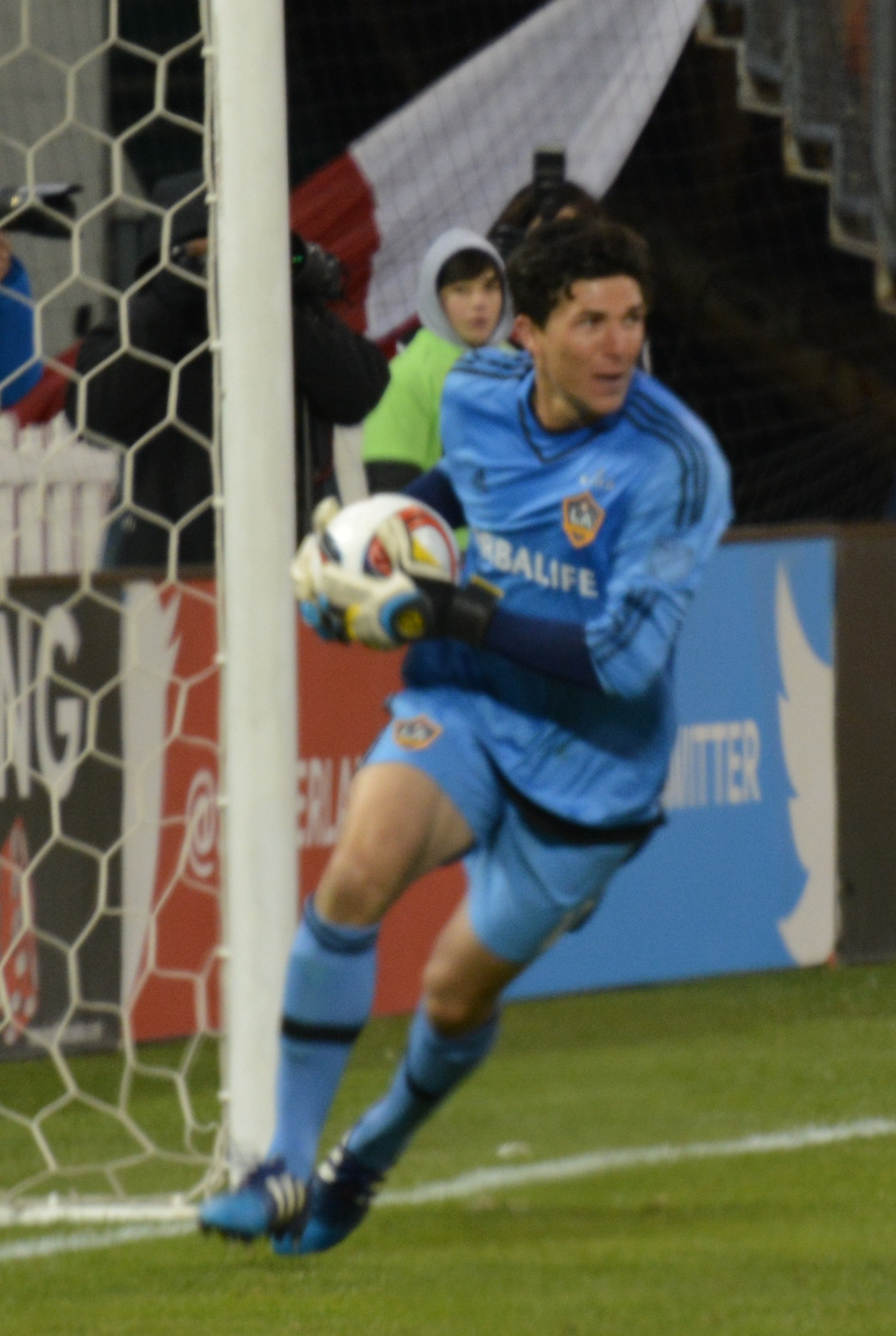
- Rowe with LA Galaxy in 2015

Personal information
- Full name: Brian Michael Rowe
- Date of birth: November 16, 1988 (age 37)
- Place of birth: Chicago, Illinois, US
- Height: 6 ft 1 in (1.85 m)
- Position: Goalkeeper

College career
Years	Team	Apps	(Gls)
2007–2011	UCLA Bruins	53	(0)

Senior career*
Years	Team	Apps	(Gls)
2010–2011	Ventura County Fusion	13	(0)
2012	MLS Pool	–	(–)
2012	→ Toronto FC (loan)	0	(0)
2012	→ Portland Timbers (loan)	0	(0)
2012	→ LA Galaxy (loan)	0	(0)
2012	→ Philadelphia Union (loan)	0	(0)
2012–2017	LA Galaxy	59	(0)
2014–2015	→ LA Galaxy II (loan)	8	(0)
2018	Vancouver Whitecaps	10	(0)
2019–2020	Orlando City	36	(0)
2024	Des Moines Menace	0	(0)
Total		127	(0)
- * Club domestic league appearances and goals

Brian Michael Rowe (born November 16, 1988) is an American former professional soccer player who played as a goalkeeper.

== Youth soccer ==
Rowe went to South Eugene High School, where he was voted best defensive player in 2005 and MVP in 2006. He also was first team all-district in 2005 and 2006.

Rowe played college soccer at UCLA from 2007 to 2011. During the 2010 and 2011 seasons, he started all 44 games that the club played and kept 20 clean sheets in that time. He finished his UCLA career with a 37–8–5 record. In 2011, he was named a NSCAA Second-team All-American.

== Club career ==
Chivas USA selected Rowe in the second round (No. 24 overall) of the 2012 MLS Supplemental Draft. Rowe didn't earn a contract with Chivas USA, but did sign as a MLS League Pool goalkeeper. On March 24, 2012, Rowe was signed to Toronto FC on an emergency basis. He was with the club until the signing of Quillan Roberts on April 10, 2012. In May, he joined the LA Galaxy on an emergency basis. He also appeared in two reserve league matches for the Portland Timbers, and one with the Philadelphia Union.

=== LA Galaxy ===
On July 13, 2012, Rowe signed for Major League Soccer giants LA Galaxy. After signing for the Galaxy, he served as back-up goalkeeper for the 2–0 defeat against Seattle Sounders FC on May 2, and subsequently in a consecutive 1–0 defeat at home to New York three days later.

On April 27, 2013, he made his debut against Real Salt Lake with first-choice keeper, Carlo Cudicini out with a leg strain and backup keeper Brian Perk just returning from a sports-hernia surgery. His performance earned him a clean-sheet and helped the Galaxy to a 2–0 victory.

=== Vancouver Whitecaps ===
On December 15, 2017, Rowe was traded by LA to Vancouver Whitecaps FC in exchange for a second-round pick in the 2018 MLS SuperDraft. Rowe was released by Vancouver at the end of their 2018 season.

=== Orlando City ===
After initially training with the team on trial during preseason, Rowe signed a contract with Orlando City SC on February 22, 2019. He made his debut in the season opener, a 2–2 draw at home to New York City FC. He kept his first clean sheet for the team on March 23 in a 1–0 away win at New York Red Bulls.

Having lost the starting job to offseason recruit Pedro Gallese, Rowe made his first appearance in over a year on October 7, 2020, when Gallese was away an international duty. Rowe kept a clean sheet in a goalless draw away to Atlanta United FC. On November 21, Orlando played their first MLS playoff game in history against New York City FC. Rowe served as the backup keeper, however the game went to a penalty shootout. After starting keeper Gallese received a yellow card for leaving his goal line early, which resulted in his ejection from the game, as it was his second yellow of the match, Orlando attempted to substitute Rowe into the match. The referees initially allowed the substitution, however, after some deliberation, they ultimately ruled that Orlando was not eligible to make a substitution during a shootout, resulting in defender Rodrigo Schlegel donning the gloves. Orlando went on to win the match after Schlegel saved a penalty in the seventh round of the shootout. Rowe's contract expired at the end of the 2020 season. On May 25, 2021, Rowe announced his retirement from professional soccer.

=== Des Moines Menace ===
In 2024, Rowe signed with USL League Two club Des Moines Menace to play as the starting goalkeeper in their 2024 U.S. Open Cup campaign. Rowe signed with the Menace after Sacha Kljestan, who frequented a gym near his home owned by former Menace player Matt Bourne, ended up in a spin class with Bourne's friends, one of whom was Menace general manager Charlie Bales. Bales convinced Kljestan to sign with the Menace for U.S. Open Cup matches. Rowe joined Kljestan with Euan Holden and Rowe made his debut for the team in round one against Capo FC on March 21. The two teams ended the game 2–2, but the Menace prevailed in the subsequent penalty shootout. On April 3, the Menace lost 3–1 to Union Omaha and were eliminated from the tournament.

== International career ==
In January 2017, Rowe was called up to the United States national team.

== Career statistics ==
As of matches played on April 3, 2024

Club	Season	League		Playoffs		National cup		Continental		Total	
Club	Season	Apps	Goals	Apps	Goals	Apps	Goals	Apps	Goals	Apps	Goals
LA Galaxy	2012	0	0	0	0	0	0	0	0	0	0
LA Galaxy	2013	4	0	0	0	1	0	3	0	8	0
LA Galaxy	2014	3	0	0	0	0	0	—		3	0
LA Galaxy	2015	7	0	0	0	3	0	4	0	14	0
LA Galaxy	2016	31	0	3	0	1	0	—		35	0
LA Galaxy	2017	14	0	—		1	0	—		15	0
LA Galaxy	Totals	59	0	3	0	6	0	7	0	75	0
LA Galaxy II (loan)	2014	5	0	—		—		—		5	0
LA Galaxy II (loan)	2015	3	0	—		—		—		3	0
LA Galaxy II (loan)	Totals	8	0	—		—		—		8	0
Vancouver Whitecaps FC	2018	10	0	—		0	0	—		10	0
Orlando City SC	2019	32	0	—		0	0	—		32	0
Orlando City SC	2020	4	0	1	0	—		—		5	0
Orlando City SC	Totals	36	0	1	0	0	0	—		37	0
Des Moines Menace	2024	—		—		2	0	—		2	0
Career totals		113	0	4	0	8	0	7	0	131	0

== Honors ==
LA Galaxy

- MLS Cup: 2014
