= Andrew Wolverton =

American soccer player (born 1993)

Personal information
- Full name: Andrew Joseph Wolverton
- Date of birth: June 4, 1993 (age 33)
- Place of birth: Atlanta, Georgia, United States
- Height: 6 ft 6 in (1.98 m)
- Position: Goalkeeper

Youth career
- 2008–2011: Concorde Fire
- 2011–2014: Penn State Nittany Lions

Senior career*
Years	Team	Apps	(Gls)
2013	IMG Academy Bradenton	8	(0)
2015	LA Galaxy	0	(0)
2015	→ LA Galaxy II (loan)	1	(0)

International career^{‡}
2010	United States U18	2	(0)
- * Club domestic league appearances and goals as of August 17, 2015 ‡ National team caps and goals as of August 17, 2015

Andrew Joseph Wolverton (born June 4, 1993) is an American soccer player.

== Early life ==
=== College and amateur ===
In high school at St. Pius X Catholic High School in Chamblee, GA, Wolverton started in goal for all four years and also played club soccer with the Concorde Fire USSD Academy under Gregg Blasingame.

Wolverton was in goal for the Penn State Nittany Lions men's soccer between 2011 and 2014. As a freshman, Wolverton started all 22 games for the Nittany Lions and earned 11 shutouts in his first campaign, breaking a PSU record. In all, he made a total of 72 appearances for the Nittany Lions and finished with a 0.53 Goals Against Average and recorded 32 clean sheets.

During his time with the Nittany Lions, Wolverton won numerous honors, including - 2011 College Soccer News All-Freshman Third Team, 2012 and 2014 All-Big Ten Second Team, 2013 Big Ten Goalkeeper of the Year, 2013 NSCAA All-Great Lakes First Team, 2013 All-Big Ten First Team, 2014 All-Big Ten First Team, and 2014 Big Ten Preseason Player To Watch.

During his time in college, Wolverton also played for Bradenton Academics in the USL Premier Development League.

== Club career ==
=== LA Galaxy ===
Wolverton was drafted in the fourth round (82nd overall) of the 2015 MLS SuperDraft by LA Galaxy. Wolverton was only the sixth Big Ten player taken in this year's draft, joining the likes of Fatai Alashe and Adam Montague of Michigan State, Dan Metzger and Alex Shinsky of Maryland and Tyler Miller of Northwestern.

Wolverton also became the seventh Nittany Lion soccer player to be drafted into a Major League Soccer club, following John Gallagher (Chicago Fire 2013), Mark Fetrow (Vancouver Whitecaps 2012), Corey Hertzog (NY Red Bulls 2011), Drew Cost (Real Salt Lake 2011) and Jason Yeisley (FC Dallas 2010).

Although, Wolverton was drafted in January, he had to wait five months before he was able to join the team for training due to a foot surgery that same month as the draft. On 6 June 2015, Wolverton was called to the bench as Brian Rowe's backup for the first time against Vancouver Whitecaps. Wolverton again was the backup keeper on 17 June, covering for Brian Perk in the 6–1 over PSA Elite in the Open Cup.

On 11 July 2015, Wolverton made his professional debut in the opener of 2015 International Champions Cup against Club América when he replaced Brian Rowe in the 62nd minute. On August 15, Wolverton made his professional debut for USL affiliate club LA Galaxy II in a 3–2 victory over Austin Aztex.

== International career ==
Wolverton has represented the United States in the under-18 level.

== Career statistics ==
As of July 13, 2015

Club	Season	League			U.S. Open Cup		MLS Cup		CONCACAF		Total	
Club	Season	Division	Apps	Goals	Apps	Goals	Apps	Goals	Apps	Goals	Apps	Goals
LA Galaxy II	2015	USL	1	0	0	0	0	0	0	0	1	0
Career total			1	0	0	0	0	0	0	0	1	0

== Personal life ==
Born in Atlanta, Georgia, Wolverton went to St. Pius X Catholic High School before attending to Pennsylvania State University. During his time at Penn State, Wolverton majored in management.

Wolverton is the youngest of three, with two older sisters, and is the son of Jay and Ann Wolverton.
