= Daniel Steres =

American soccer player (born 1990)

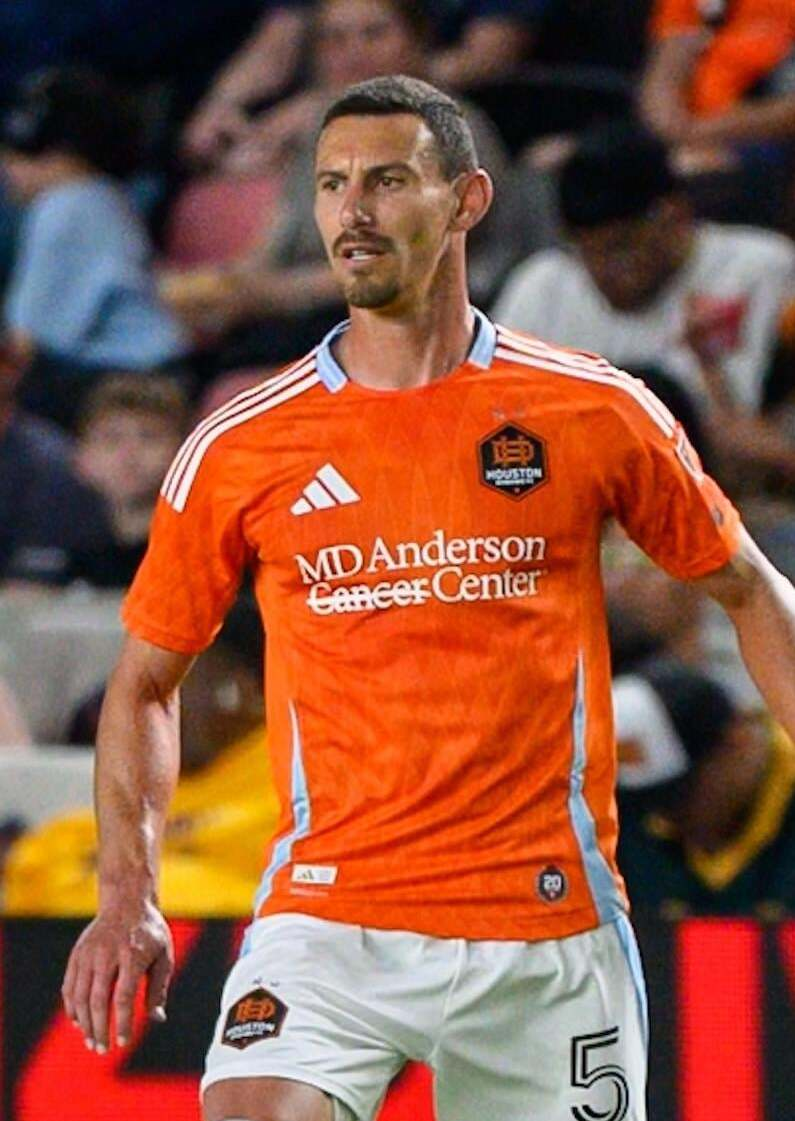
- Steres with Houston Dynamo in 2025

Personal information
- Full name: Daniel Howard Steres
- Date of birth: November 11, 1990 (age 36)
- Place of birth: Burbank, California, U.S.
- Height: 6 ft 0 in (1.83 m)
- Position: Defender

College career
Years	Team	Apps	(Gls)
2008–2011	San Diego State Aztecs	72	(13)

Senior career*
Years	Team	Apps	(Gls)
2011–2012	Ventura County Fusion	21	(1)
2012	Seattle Sounders FC	0	(0)
2013	Wilmington Hammerheads	25	(7)
2014–2015	LA Galaxy II	49	(5)
2016–2021	LA Galaxy	140	(8)
2022–2025	Houston Dynamo	77	(6)
- * Club domestic league appearances and goals as of October 22, 2025

Daniel Howard Steres (born November 11, 1990) is an American professional soccer player who plays as a defender. He was USL-Pro All-League Second Team in 2013 and 2014, USL All-League First Team in 2015, and LA Galaxy II Defender of the Year in 2014 and 2015.

== Early and personal life ==
Steres was born in Burbank, California, to Suzie and Mark Steres. He grew up in Calabasas, California. He has a younger brother named Andrew; their family is Jewish. His maternal grandmother is Jo Seligman, and his paternal grandparents are Bob and Rochelle Steres. Daniel Steres grew up a fan of the LA Galaxy, with his favorite players being stars Cobi Jones and Mauricio Cienfuegos. He is also a fan of English club Tottenham.

== Career ==
=== College and amateur ===
Steres started playing soccer with the DMS11 U-11 team and played with the same team to U-19, during which the club won a Dallas Cup championship.

He played four years for the Calabasas High School Coyotes soccer team. He twice was a Maramonte League selection, and was all-California Interscholastic Federation.

Steres played four years of college soccer on scholarship at San Diego State University for the San Diego State Aztecs men's soccer team between 2008 and 2011. As a freshman, Steres was named the Aztecs' Top Newcomer. In 2008, he was named to the 2008 Jewish Sports Review All-America First-Team, along with Zac MacMath. In 2009, he was an honorable mention for the All-Pac-10 Team and honorable mention Pac-10 All-Academic Team. In 2010, Steres was named to the All-Pac-10 Second Team as a junior. In 2011, he was NSCAA All-Far West Region First Team, All-Pac-12 First Team, Pac-12 All-Academic Team honorable mention, and was named the Aztecs' Team MVP, for his senior season.

=== Professional ===
==== Early career ====
Steres was drafted 28th in the 2012 MLS Supplemental Draft by Chivas USA, but did not sign a contract with the team.

Following his brief stint with Chivas USA, Steres played for amateur side Ventura County Fusion in the USL PDL, who he had previously played with in 2011 during the college offseason.

On June 6, 2012, Steres was selected by Seattle Sounders FC in the 2012 MLS Waiver Draft. He signed with the sounders on June 22. He was released following the 2012 season, having made no first team appearances.

==== Wilmington Hammerheads ====
Steres signed with USL Pro side Wilmington Hammerheads for the 2013 season. On April 20, he made his Hammerheads debut, playing the full 90 minutes in a 2–0 win over Antigua Barracuda. Steres scored his first goal for Wilmington on May 18 to give the Hammerheads a 2–1 win against the Los Angeles Blues. He ended the season with 25 appearances, 7 goals, and 3 assists in league play, leading the team in goals despite primarily playing as a centerback. Steres was named to the USL Pro All-League Second Team and was named team MVP. Despite a good season from Steres, the Hammerheads missed out on the playoffs, finishing 9th in the table, one spot and one point below the last playoff spot.

==== LA Galaxy II ====
For the 2014 season, Steres signed with LA Galaxy II in USL Pro. He made his debut for Los Dos on March 22, scoring once in a 3–1 win over Orange County Blues FC. Steres finished the regular season with 3 goals in 24 appearances, helping Galaxy II finish third, qualifying for the playoffs. He started both of Los Dos's playoff games as they reached the semifinal, losing 3–2 to eventual champions Sacramento Republic. Steres was named to the USL Pro All-League Second Team for the second straight year and was named LA Galaxy II Defender of the Year.

Steres enjoyed another strong season with Los Dos in 2015, making 25 appearances and scoring 2 goals in the regular season. He served as the team captain, leading Galaxy II to a 5th-place finish in the conference. Steres played every minute of Galaxy II's four playoff games as they reached the USL Championship, losing 2–1 in extra time to the Rochester Rhinos. He was named to the USL All-League First Team and was the Galaxy II Defender of the Year for the second straight year.

==== LA Galaxy ====
On December 17, 2015, Steres signed a first team contract with the LA Galaxy. On March 6, in the opening match of the 2016 season, Steres made his Galaxy and MLS debut, scoring once in a 4–1 win over D.C. United. He ended the regular season with 1 goal and 1 assist in 31 appearances, helping the Galaxy to a third-place finish in the Western Conference. Steres played every minute of LA's three playoff games as they lost on penalties to the Colorado Rapids in leg 2 of the Conference Semifinals. He also made an appearance in the CONCACAF Champions League and U.S. Open Cup during the season.

After starting the first 12 games of the 2017 season, Steres missed 9 games (6 MLS, 3 Open Cup) with a hamstring injury. He returned to action on July 17, playing the full 90 minutes in a 1–0 loss to Vancouver Whitecaps FC. On July 22, Steres scored twice in a 4–3 loss to the New England Revolution. He missed the final six matches of the year due to a stress fracture in his back. Steres ended the season with 3 goals in 21 appearances as the Galaxy finished last in the West.

Steres made his first start of the 2018 season on March 24, helping the Galaxy to a 3–0 win over Vancouver and earning a spot in the MLS Team of the Week. On March 31, Steres picked up an assist to help the Galaxy come back from a three-goal deficit to defeat rivals LAFC 4–3 in the first ever El Tráfico matchup. He ended the regular season with 20 appearances and 1 assist as the Galaxy finished 7th in the Western Conference, 1 place and 1 point out of the playoffs.

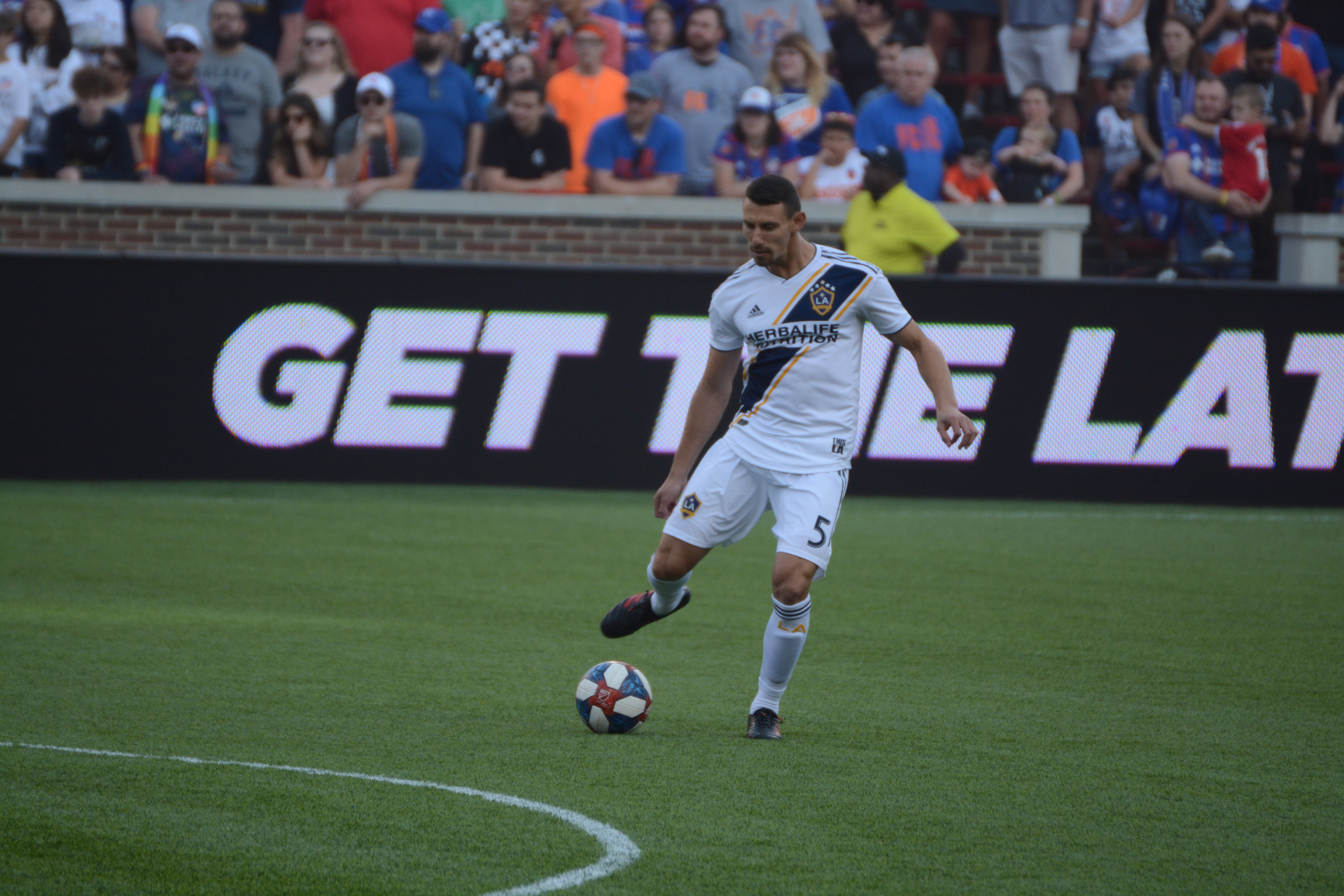
Steres in June 2019

Steres and the Galaxy opened the 2019 season on March 2, with Steres scoring to help the Galaxy beat the Chicago Fire 2–1. On April 5, Steres scored in a 2–0 win against the Whitecaps, a performance that saw him named to the MLS Team of the Week. Steres made 30 appearances and scored 3 goals in the regular season, helping LA finish 5th in the West, returning to the playoffs following a two-year absence. Steres played the full match in both of the Galaxy's playoff games as they reached the Conference Semifinals, where they lost 5–3 to LAFC. On December 12, 2019, Steres signed a new contract with the Galaxy.

On August 29, 2020, Steres scored to help give the Galaxy a 3–2 win over California Clásico rivals San Jose Earthquakes. In a shortened season due to the COVID-19 pandemic, Steres appeared in 20 out of a possible 23 games (all starts) and scored once. The Galaxy finished the season 10th in the Western Conference, missing out on the playoffs.

Steres started the first 8 games of the 2021 season, but had to be subbed off due to a leg injury on June 19 in the first 10 minutes of a 2–1 loss to Seattle Sounders FC. He returned to the field on July 17, coming on as a late substitute in a 2–1 loss to Vancouver. Steres made the Team of the Week following his performance on September 11, where he picked up an assist and made multiple big plays defensively in a 1–1 draw against the Rapids. He ended the season with 18 appearances and 2 assists as the Galaxy finished 8th in the West, failing to qualify for the playoffs for the second straight season.

==== Houston Dynamo ====
On December 12, 2021, Steres was traded to the Houston Dynamo in exchange for a third-round pick in the 2022 MLS SuperDraft. He made his Dynamo debut on February 27, 2022, playing the full 90 in a 0–0 draw against Real Salt Lake. He scored his first goal for the Dynamo on August 13 in a 3–2 loss to CF Montréal. The following week he picked up his first assist for Houston, laying the ball off for Sebastián Ferreira five minutes into stoppage time to salvage a 1–1 draw against the Colorado Rapids. Steres ended the regular season with 18 appearances, 2 goals, and 1 assist as Houston finished 13th in the Western Conference, failing to qualify for the playoffs. On November 3, Steres and the Dynamo agreed to a contract through 2024, with an option for 2025. Houston declined his contract option following the 2025 season.

== Career statistics ==
As of match played on March 26, 2023

Appearances and goals by club, season and competition
Club	Season	League			National cup		Playoffs		Continental		Total	
Club	Season	Division	Apps	Goals	Apps	Goals	Apps	Goals	Apps	Goals	Apps	Goals
Seattle Sounders FC	2012	MLS	0	0	0	0	0	0	0	0	0	0
Wilmington Hammerheads	2013	USL Pro	25	7	1	0	—		—		26	7
LA Galaxy II	2014	USL Pro	24	3	1	0	2	0	—		27	3
LA Galaxy II	2015	USL	25	2	0	0	4	0	—		29	2
LA Galaxy II	Total		49	5	1	0	6	0	0	0	56	5
LA Galaxy	2016	MLS	31	1	1	0	3	0	1 (Note: Appearances in CONCACAF Champions League)	0	36	1
LA Galaxy	2017	MLS	21	3	0	0	—		—		21	3
LA Galaxy	2018	MLS	20	0	1	0	—		—		21	0
LA Galaxy	2019	MLS	30	3	2	0	2	0	1 (Note: Appearances in Leagues Cup)	0	35	3
LA Galaxy	2020	MLS	20	1	—		—		—		20	1
LA Galaxy	2021	MLS	18	0	—		—		—		18	0
LA Galaxy	Total		140	8	4	0	5	0	2	0	151	8
Houston Dynamo	2022	MLS	18	2	1	0	—		—		19	2
Houston Dynamo	2023	MLS	2	0	0	0	0	0	0	0	2	0
Houston Dynamo	Total		20	2	1	0	0	0	0	0	21	2
Career total			234	22	7	0	11	0	2	0	254	22

== Honors ==
LA Galaxy II

- Western Conference (USL): 2015

Houston Dynamo

- U.S. Open Cup: 2023

Individual

- USL-Pro All-League Second Team: 2013, 2014
- USL All-League First Team: 2015
- LA Galaxy II Defender of the Year: 2014, 2015
- In 2018 Steres was inducted into the Southern California Jewish Sports Hall of Fame.

== See also ==
- List of select Jewish association football (soccer) players
