= André Auras =

French footballer (born 1991)

Personal information
- Full name: André Auras
- Date of birth: 22 April 1991 (age 35)
- Place of birth: Dakar, Senegal
- Height: 6 ft 0 in (1.83 m)
- Position: Defensive midfielder

Team information
- Current team: EA Saint-Renan

Youth career
- 2006–2011: Auxerre
- 2011–2012: Brest

Senior career*
Years	Team	Apps	(Gls)
2012–2013	Brest	13	(0)
2014–2015	LA Galaxy II	38	(4)
2016–2017	Stade Plabennec	21	(1)
2017–	EA Saint-Renan	?	(?)

International career
2007–2008	France U17	4	(0)
- * Club domestic league appearances and goals as of 25 December 2017

André Auras (born 22 April 1991 in Dakar) is a French footballer who plays as a midfielder for En Avant Saint-Renan.

== Career ==
=== Club ===
At age 15, Auras joined the academy of Auxerre. He stayed with the club until 2011 when he signed his first professional contract for the reserve squad of Stade Brestois 29 who were in Ligue 1 at the time. In January 2013, he was signed to the senior side of Brest on a 2-year contract. Over parts of two seasons at the club, Auras made 11 appearances in Ligue 1 and 2 appearances in Ligue 2 (following Brest's relegation at the end of the 2012-13 season).

In February 2014, Stade Brestois 29 made an official announcement that Auras had declined a contract offer from the club to join LA Galaxy II of the USL Pro, the reserve team of the Los Angeles Galaxy of Major League Soccer. Auras made his debut for LA on 7 April 2014 against Oklahoma City Energy FC. League media described his performance, which included an assist on the 39th-minute game-winning goal by Daniel Steres, as "stellar".

In February 2016 it was announced that Auras had left Galaxy II and was on trial with FC Dallas of Major League Soccer. He started for the team in a preseason friendly against the New England Revolution.

=== International ===
Auras has represented France at the Under-17 level, including in the 2008 UEFA European Under-17 Championship. His first call-ups were for two friendlies against Turkey in December 2007.
