= Jason Bli =

French footballer (born 1993)

Personal information
- Full name: Jason Nathan Bli
- Date of birth: 2 November 1993 (age 33)
- Place of birth: Clichy-la-Garenne, France
- Height: 1.75 m (5 ft 9 in)
- Position: Left back

Team information
- Current team: US Ivry

Youth career
- 2011–2012: Paris Saint-Germain
- 2012: Atlético Madrid
- 2013: Paris FC

Senior career*
Years	Team	Apps	(Gls)
2013	Paris FC II	11	(0)
2013–2014	L'Entente SSG	0	(0)
2014–2015	LA Galaxy II	11	(0)
2015	Lyn	9	(1)
2019–2021	Hønefoss	22	(2)
2022–	US Ivry	24	(0)
- * Club domestic league appearances and goals as of 25 August 2023

Jason Nathan Bli (born 2 November 1993) is a French footballer who plays as a left back for US Ivry.

== Early life ==
Bli was born in Clichy-la-Garenne, France, to an Ivorian mother. He acquired French nationality on 24 January 2001, through the collective effect of his mother's naturalization.

== Career ==
=== Club ===
Bli started his career with French Division 3 club Paris FC, where he played for the club's reserve team. He moved to CFA club L'Entente SSG during their 2013-14 season.

Bli signed with USL Pro club LA Galaxy II on August 20, 2014.

In late August 2015, Bli signed a permanent deal with Lyn Fotball in the third tier in Norway. He made his debut against Harstad IL August 23 of that year.
