= Jaime Villarreal =

American professional soccer player (born 1995)

Personal information
- Date of birth: June 23, 1995 (age 31)
- Place of birth: Inglewood, California, United States
- Height: 1.73 m (5 ft 8 in)
- Position: Midfielder

Youth career
- LA Galaxy

Senior career*
Years	Team	Apps	(Gls)
2014–2016	LA Galaxy II	61	(4)
2017	LA Galaxy	7	(0)
2018–2021	Sacramento Republic	91	(6)

International career^{‡}
2014	United States U20		
- * Club domestic league appearances and goals as of November 1, 2021 ‡ National team caps and goals as of August 2, 2014

Jamie Villarreal (born June 23, 1995) is an American professional soccer player who plays as a midfielder.

== Career ==
=== LA Galaxy ===
Born in Inglewood, California, Villarreal started his career at the LA Galaxy academy set-up. While with the U18s Villarreal scored ten goals as he led his team to the Southwest Division championship. In 2014, he signed his first professional contract with the LA Galaxy II, the reserve team of the LA Galaxy, of the USL. He made his debut for the team on June 8, 2014, against the Dayton Dutch Lions. Villarreal came on as a 58th-minute substitute for Jack McBean as LA Galaxy II won 5–1.

He made his debut for the senior team on May 21, 2017, coming on as a late substitute for the injured João Pedro in the 87th minute as LA Galaxy beat Minnesota United 2–1.

=== Sacramento Republic ===
Villarreal signed with USL side Sacramento Republic FC for the 2018 season on January 4, 2018. Villarreal was released by Sacramento following the 2021 season.

== International ==
Villarreal has represented the United States at the under-20 level.

== Personal life ==
Villarreal was born in the United States and is of Mexican descent. His older brother José (born 1993) is also a professional soccer player.

== Career statistics ==
As of July 15, 2018

Club	Season	League			Playoffs		Domestic Cup		Continental		Total	
Club	Season	Division	Apps	Goals	Apps	Goals	Apps	Goals	Apps	Goals	Apps	Goals
LA Galaxy II	2014	USL	4	0	2	0	—		—		6	0
LA Galaxy II	2015	USL	23	1	2	0	—		—		25	1
LA Galaxy II	2016	USL	27	3	1	0	—		—		28	3
LA Galaxy II	2017	USL	7	0	0	0	—		—		7	0
LA Galaxy II	Total		61	4	5	0	—		—		66	4
LA Galaxy	2017	MLS	7	0	0	0	3	0	—		10	0
LA Galaxy	Total		7	0	0	0	3	0	—		10	0
Sacramento Republic	2018	USL	19	0	0	0	3	0	—		22	0
Sacramento Republic	Total		19	0	0	0	3	0	—		22	0
Career total			87	4	5	0	6	0	0	0	98	4
