= Bradley Diallo =

French footballer (born 1990)

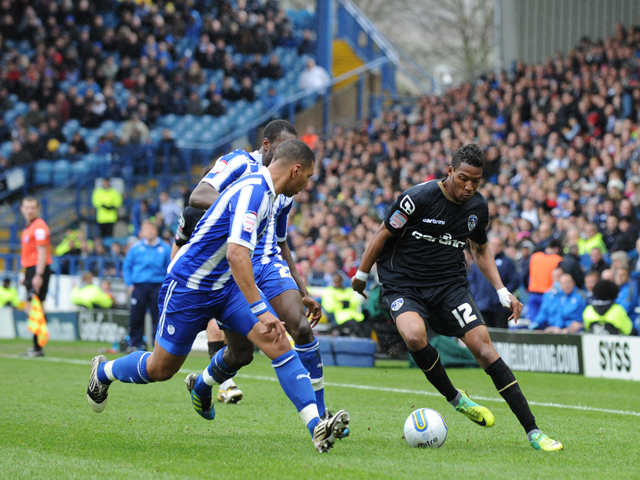
- Diallo (right) playing for Oldham Athletic

Personal information
- Date of birth: 20 July 1990 (age 36)
- Place of birth: Marseille, France
- Height: 1.80 m (5 ft 11 in)
- Position: Defender

Youth career
- 2000–2009: Marseille

Senior career*
Years	Team	Apps	(Gls)
2009–2010	Marseille B		
2011–2012	Oldham Athletic	15	(0)
2012–2013	RWS Bruxelles	10	(0)
2014–2017	LA Galaxy II	58	(3)
2017	LA Galaxy	18	(0)
2018–2019	Gaz Metan Mediaș	16	(0)
2019	Politehnica Iași	17	(0)
2020	Chindia Târgoviște	10	(1)
2020–2022	FC U Craiova	38	(2)
2022	SJK	5	(0)
2023	FC Brașov	6	(1)
2023–2024	Metaloglobus București	10	(0)
2024–2025	US Vimy	10	(0)
- * Club domestic league appearances and goals as of 11:46, 17 August 2025 (UTC)

Bradley Diallo (born 20 July 1990) is a French professional footballer who plays as a defender. After starting out as a left-back, he developed into a centre-back in the second part of his career.

== Career ==
=== Marseille ===
Diallo played for Marseille, coming up through the youth ranks and making his first competitive start for the club in October 2009. He featured in four first team friendly games.

=== Oldham Athletic ===
On 19 August 2011, Diallo signed for Oldham Athletic on a five-month contract. On 20 August 2011, he made his Football League debut as a 90th-minute substitute, coming on for Reuben Reid in a 2–0 victory over rivals Rochdale. On 3 September 2011, in a game against local rivals Huddersfield Town, Diallo assisted Shefki Kuqi with a pinpoint cross after a run from the left flank but was later shown a straight red card in the 76th minute for a foul on Oscar Gobern. After serving his suspension Diallo picked up a hamstring injury and was out of action for two and a half months. After recovering he again suffered the same injury in his first match back, due to being rushed into action too quickly. He was taken off after only 14th minutes in a reserves match against Bolton.

=== RWS Bruxelles ===
After a successful trial with RWS Bruxelles, Diallo signed a professional contract with the club in January 2013. He put pen to paper on a 18-month contract with the club, with an option to extend. Bradley Diallo made his debut on 2 February 2013 against Sportkring Sint-Niklaas.

=== LA Galaxy ===
Diallo joined the USL Pro team the LA Galaxy II ahead of their inaugural 2014 season. He made his league appearance debut for the LA Galaxy II on 13 April 2014 against fellow USL Pro side Sacramento Republic FC. In 2017, Diallo moved to the first team and played 18 games with LA Galaxy before departing for Liga I club Gaz Metan Mediaș.

=== Romania ===
On 17 July 2018, Gaz Metan Mediaș announced the signing of Diallo.

On 26 June 2019, Politehnica Iași announced the signing of Diallo.

On 23 January 2020, Diallo signed a one-and-a-half-year contract with Romanian club Chindia Târgoviște.

=== Finland ===
On 1 July 2022, Diallo signed with SJK in Finland until the end of 2022.

== Personal life ==
Diallo is of Malian descent.

== Career statistics ==
As of match played 25 April 2025

Appearances and goals by club, season and competition
Club	Season	League			National cup (Note: Includes US Open Cup, Cupa României)		Continental		Other		Total	
Club	Season	Division	Apps	Goals	Apps	Goals	Apps	Goals	Apps	Goals	Apps	Goals
Oldham Athletic	2011–12	League One	15	0	—		—		1 (Note: Includes EFL Trophy)	0	16	0
RWS Bruxelles	2012–13	Belgian Second Division	10	0	—		—		—		10	0
LA Galaxy II	2014	USL Pro	21	0	1	1	—		—		22	1
LA Galaxy II	2015	USL Championship	24	2	—		—		—		24	2
LA Galaxy II	2016	USL Championship	6	1	—		—		—		6	1
LA Galaxy II	2017	USL Championship	7	0	—		—		—		7	0
LA Galaxy II	Total		83	3	1	1	—		1	0	85	4
LA Galaxy	2017	MLS	18	0	1	0	—		—		19	0
Gaz Metan Mediaș	2018–19	Liga I	16	0	1	0	—		—		17	0
Politehnica Iași	2019–20	Liga I	17	0	1	0	—		—		18	0
Chindia Târgoviște	2019–20	Liga I	10	1	—		—		—		10	1
FC U Craiova	2020–21	Liga II	11	2	1	0	—		—		12	2
FC U Craiova	2021–22	Liga I	27	0	1	0	—		—		28	0
FC U Craiova	Total		99	3	5	0	0	0	0	0	104	3
SJK	2022	Veikkausliiga	4	0	—		0	0	—		4	0
SJK Akatemia	2022	Kakkonen	1	0	—		—		—		1	0
Brașov	2022–23	Liga II	6	1	—		—		—		6	1
Metaloglobus București	2023–24	Liga II	10	0	1	2	—		—		11	2
US Vimy	2024–25	National 3	10	0	—		—		—		10	0
Career total			210	7	7	3	0	0	1	0	218	10

== Honours ==
Olympique de Marseille

- Ligue 1: 2009–10

FC U Craiova

- Liga II: 2020–21
