= Dragan Stojkov =

Macedonian footballer

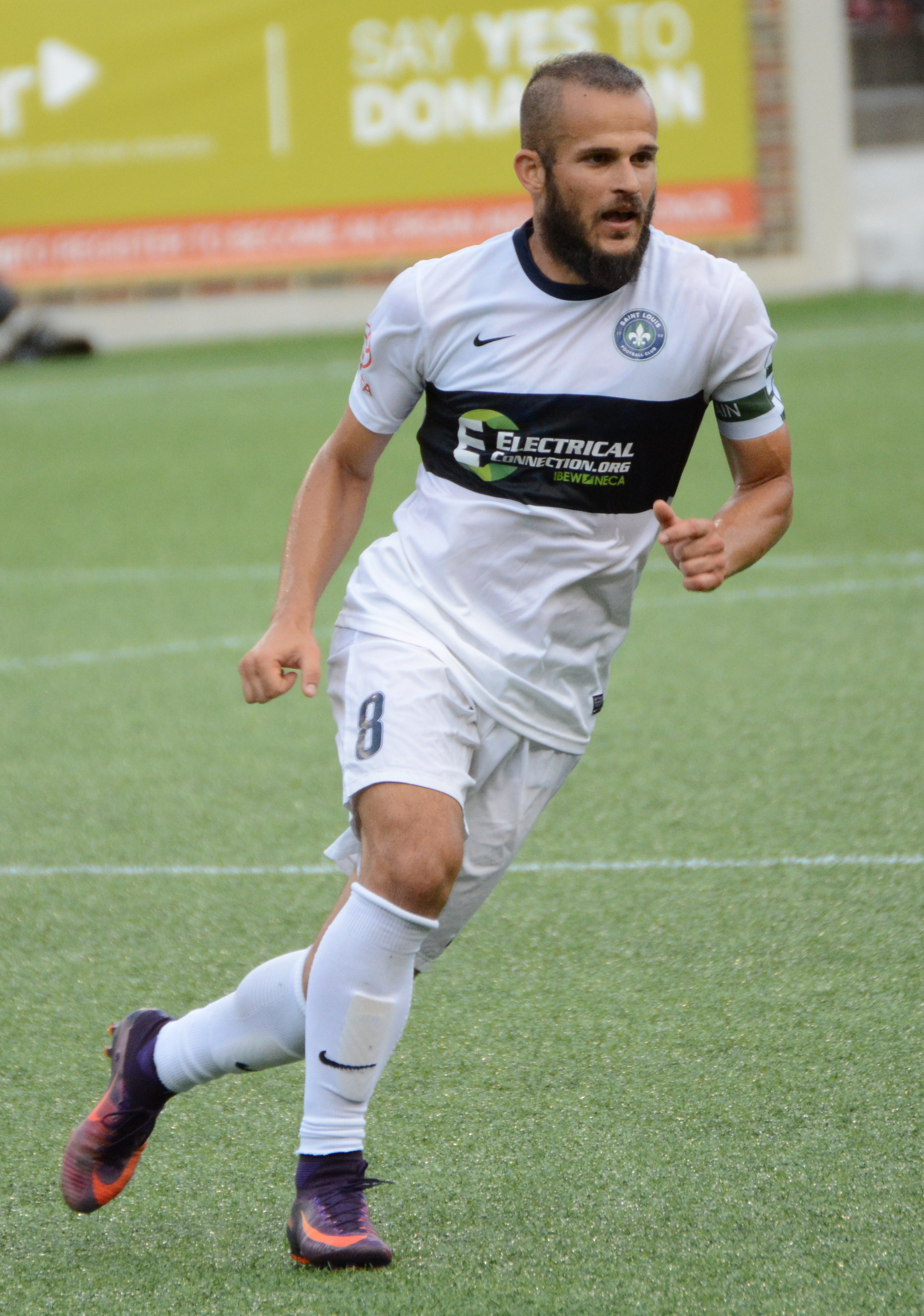
- Dragan Stojkov playing for Saint Louis FC

Personal information
- Date of birth: 23 February 1988 (age 38)
- Place of birth: Strumica, SR Macedonia
- Height: 1.75 m (5 ft 9 in)
- Position: Midfielder

Senior career*
Years	Team	Apps	(Gls)
2005-2007	Belasica	35	(3)
2007	→ Incheon United (loan)	0	(0)
2008	Egaleo	22	(2)
2008–2010	Ilisiakos	14	(0)
2009–2010	→ Napredak Kruševac (loan)	19	(0)
2010–2013	Jagodina	63	(0)
2014	LA Galaxy II	18	(1)
2015	Indy Eleven	21	(0)
2017	Saint Louis FC	23	(0)
2018–2019	Belasica	31	(0)
2019–2022	Rabotnički	57	(2)
2022–2023	Tikvesh	27	(0)
2023	Makedonija GP	29	(1)
2024	AP Brera	21	(0)

International career
	Macedonia U17	3	(0)
2005–2006	Macedonia U19	9	(0)
2006–2009	Macedonia U21	10	(1)
- * Club domestic league appearances and goals as of 8 December 2024

Dragan Stojkov (Macedonian: Драган Стојков; born on 23 February 1988) is a Macedonian professional footballer.

== Club career ==
Born in Strumica, after playing in his homeland club FK Belasica, and an unsuccessful journey in South Korea on loan for the K1 league side Incheon United FC in 2007, in January 2008 he moved to Greece to play the rest of the season in Egaleo F.C. Next, he moved to Ilisiakos F.C., where he played the 2008–09 season. In summer 2009 he moved to Serbia to play in the Serbian Superliga club FK Napredak Kruševac. At the end of the season, he moved to FK Jagodina where he played total of 63 games making the biggest success of the club's history, two consecutive seasons finishing fourth and third in the league standings, playing twice in Europa League qualification and winning the Serbian Cup in 2013 for the first time in the club's history. Playing a total of four seasons in the Serbian Superliga Serbian top league, he continued his career in the United States.

After spending 2014 with LA Galaxy II, Stojkov signed for Indy Eleven on 29 November 2014. Stojkov started 18 of 21 games played for the Eleven during the 2015 NASL season, logging 1,412 minutes, 3 assists and 4 yellow cards. He mutually terminated his contract with Indy on 30 March 2016.

On 5 January 2017, he signed with USL Team Saint Louis FC. In June 2018 he returned to his parent-club FK Belasica which this year entered Macedonian First Football League.

== International career ==
Stojkov had played in the Macedonia national under-19 national team before started playing in the Macedonia national under-21 football team in 2006. His last call up was in a convocation for a friendly in January 2009.

In November 2005, being only aged 17, he received a call to join Macedonian national team for a friendly match against Liechtenstein. However, he was an unused substitute. Later during 2006 national team coach Boban Babunski counted on him, however ever since he never got the chance to make a debut.

== Honours ==
Jagodina

- Serbian Cup: 2013
