= Kainoa Bailey =

American soccer player

Personal information
- Full name: Kainoa Agrifino Locquiao Bailey
- Date of birth: 2 August 1995 (age 31)
- Place of birth: Honolulu, Hawaii, United States
- Height: 1.77 m (5 ft 10 in)
- Position: Winger

Youth career
- 2011–2012: Real Salt Lake
- 2012: Cruzeiro
- 2013: D.C. United

Senior career*
Years	Team	Apps	(Gls)
2012	Nashville Metros	4	(1)
2013–2014	Bayer 04 Leverkusen II	7	(0)
2014–2016	LA Galaxy II	25	(1)
2018	FC Columbus	2	(2)
2018–2019	Türkspor Augsburg	0	(0)
2019	Des Moines Menace	9	(0)
2020	ADT	3	(0)
2022–2023	Stallion Laguna	11	(1)
2023	Persikabo 1973	2	(0)
2024–	Dynamic Herb Cebu	13	(2)
- * Club domestic league appearances and goals as of 19 May 2025

Kainoa Agrifino Locquiao Bailey (born 2 August 1995) is an American professional soccer player who plays as a winger for Philippines Football League club Dynamic Herb Cebu.

== Personal life ==
Kainoa is the older brother of Zico Bailey who currently plays for New Mexico United in USL Championship.

== Career ==
=== Bayer Leverkusen II ===
On August 7, 2013, Bailey signed with Bayer 04 Leverkusen, where he played with their reserve team during 2013 and 2014 just before Leverkusen disbanded their reserve team.

=== LA Galaxy II ===
After his release from Bayer Leverkusen, Bailey signed with USL Pro club LA Galaxy II on August 20, 2014.

Bailey was released by LA Galaxy II in January 2017.

=== FC Columbus ===
In 2018, Bailey joined National Premier Soccer League club FC Columbus.

=== Des Moines Menace ===
Bailey went on trial with Real Monarchs during the 2019 preseason, scoring a goal during the Monarchs' win over the Utah Valley Wolverines.

He later joined USL League Two club Des Moines Menace.

=== Azkals Development Team ===
In 2020, he joined Philippines Football League club Azkals Development Team.

=== Stallion Laguna ===
In 2022, Bailey joined Stallion Laguna.

== International career ==
Born in United States of America to a Jamaican father and a Filipina mother, Bailey is eligible to represent Jamaica, United States and Philippines at international level.

=== Philippines ===
In June 2019, Bailey received his first call up for the Philippines in a friendly against China.

== Career statistics ==
=== Club ===
As of 7 August 2022

Club	Season	League			Cup		Total	
Club	Season	Division	Apps	Goals	Apps	Goals	Apps	Goals
Azkals Development Team	2020	PFL	1	0	–		1	0
Stallion Laguna	2022	PFL	1	1	6	0	7	1
Career total			2	1	6	0	8	1
