= Jack McBean =

American soccer player (born 1994)

Personal information
- Full name: John Lucas McBean
- Date of birth: December 15, 1994 (age 31)
- Place of birth: Newport Beach, California, United States
- Height: 6 ft 0 in (1.83 m)
- Position: Forward

Youth career
- 2009–2011: LA Galaxy

Senior career*
| Years | Team | Apps | (Gls) |
| 2011–2017 | LA Galaxy | 37 | (4) |
| 2014–2017 | LA Galaxy II | 65 | (26) |
| 2016 | → Coventry City (loan) | 2 | (0) |
| 2018 | Colorado Rapids | 22 | (2) |
| Total | | 126 | (32) |

International career
| 2011 | United States U17 | 10 | (0) |
| 2012 | United States U18 | 2 | (0) |
- * Club domestic league appearances and goals

John Lucas "Jack" McBean (born December 15, 1994) is an American former professional soccer player who played as a forward.

== Club career ==
McBean, a California native, formally signed for LA Galaxy at the age of 16 in April 2011. As of July 2011, he was the youngest player to have signed for the club in its history. He had previously played for the LA Galaxy under-16s and, prior to that, Slammers FC and Corona del Mar High School. He was widely regarded as one of the greatest talents to ever come through the Galaxy academy.

He was assigned the number 32 shirt for the 2011 Major League Soccer season.

He made his first appearance for the club in a friendly match against Manchester City on July 24, 2011, coming on as a 66th-minute substitute for teammate Miguel Pedro López. The Los Angeles Times noted that he "quickly provided a threat" after appearing, while Fox Sports West stated that he "immediately made an impact" in the game. The match finished 1-1, but included a penalty shootout. Manchester City won the shootout 7–6, with McBean having his penalty saved by goalkeeper Joe Hart. On October 23, 2011, McBean played his first league game against Houston Dynamo getting the start, and subsequently scored.

He moved down to the LA Galaxy's reserve club, LA Galaxy II, following the 2014 season. On June 22, 2016, he was once again signed by LA Galaxy.

McBean signed for English League One side Coventry City on a five-month loan deal on August 19, 2016. The striker made his first-team debut as a substitute in the 1–1 draw with Morecambe in the FA Cup.

McBean was released by LA Galaxy on November 7, 2017. He was traded to Colorado Rapids on December 14, 2017, in exchange for a conditional fourth-round pick in the 2019 MLS SuperDraft. McBean was released by Colorado at the end of their 2018 season.

McBean retired from professional soccer following the 2018 season due to a foot injury that was suffered near the conclusion of the season.

== International career ==
McBean represented his country of birth at youth levels. He played for the United States under-17s in the 2011 FIFA U-17 World Cup, in which the US reached the round of 16, and in the 2011 CONCACAF U-17 Championship, in which the US were champions.

McBean has a Scottish father and was eligible to play for the senior national teams of the United States and Scotland. In June 2011, Scotland manager Craig Levein confirmed that he had instructed his chief scout Michael Oliver to continue a dialogue with the player and his parents to determine his interest in representing Scotland in future. He did not confirm a long-term allegiance to either country.

== Career statistics ==
=== Club ===
Appearances and goals by club, season and competition
| Club | Season | League | | | Open Cup | | Playoffs | | North America | | | Total | |
| Club | Season | Division | Apps | Goals | Apps | Goals | Apps | Goals | Season | Apps | Goals | Apps | Goals |
|---|---|---|---|---|---|---|---|---|---|---|---|---|---|
| LA Galaxy | 2011 | MLS | 1 | 1 | 0 | 0 | 0 | 0 | 2011–12 | 0 | 0 | 1 | 1 |
| LA Galaxy | 2012 | MLS | 1 | 0 | 0 | 0 | 0 | 0 | 2011–12 | 0 | 0 | 3 | 3 |
| LA Galaxy | 2012 | MLS | 1 | 0 | 0 | 0 | 0 | 0 | 2012–13 | 2 | 3 | 3 | 3 |
| LA Galaxy | 2013 | MLS | 15 | 1 | 0 | 0 | 0 | 0 | 2012–13 | 3 | 1 | 21 | 3 |
| LA Galaxy | 2013 | MLS | 15 | 1 | 0 | 0 | 0 | 0 | 2013–14 | 3 | 1 | 21 | 3 |
| LA Galaxy | 2014 | MLS | 0 | 0 | 0 | 0 | 0 | 0 | 2013–14 | 0 | 0 | 0 | 0 |
| LA Galaxy | 2016 | MLS | 2 | 0 | 2 | 0 | | | – | | | 4 | 0 |
| LA Galaxy | Total | | 19 | 2 | 2 | 0 | 0 | 0 | Total | 8 | 5 | 29 | 7 |
| LA Galaxy II | 2014 | USL Pro | 24 | 5 | 2 | 1 | 2 | 0 | – | | | 28 | 6 |
| LA Galaxy II | 2015 | USL | 26 | 6 | 1 | 0 | 4 | 0 | – | | | 31 | 6 |
| LA Galaxy II | 2016 | USL | 17 | 15 | – | | 0 | 0 | – | | | 17 | 15 |
| LA Galaxy II | Total | | 67 | 26 | 3 | 1 | 6 | 0 | – | | | 76 | 27 |
| Career total | | | 86 | 28 | 5 | 1 | 6 | 0 | Total | 8 | 5 | 105 | 34 |

== Honors ==
LA Galaxy

- MLS Cup: 2011, 2012, 2014
- Supporters' Shield: 2011

LA Galaxy II

- Western Conference (Playoffs): 2015

United States under-17s

CONCACAF U-17 Championship: 2011
