= Bradford Jamieson IV =

American professional soccer player (born 1996)

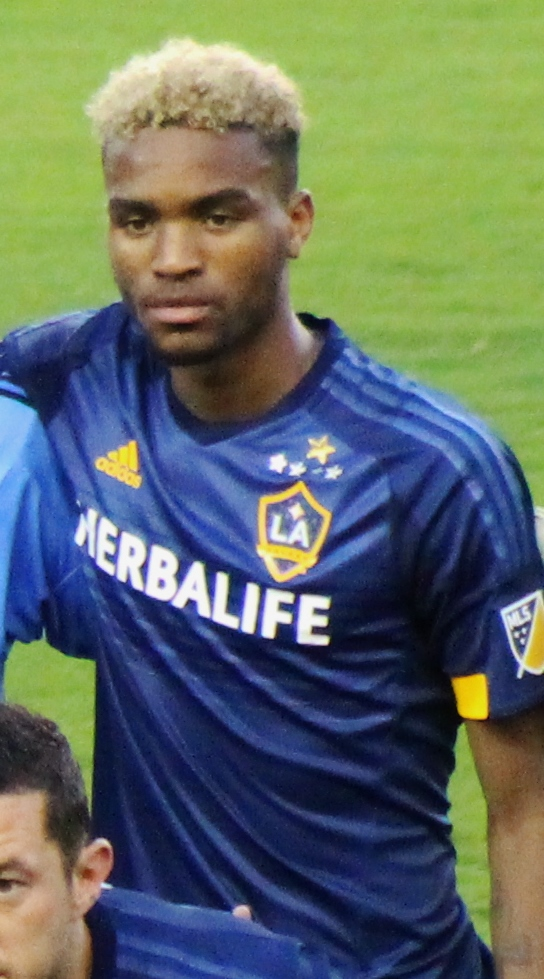
- Jamieson in 2015

Personal information
- Full name: Bradford Redder Jamieson IV
- Date of birth: October 18, 1996 (age 30)
- Place of birth: Los Angeles, California, United States
- Height: 1.85 m (6 ft 1 in)
- Position: Forward

Youth career
- Santa Monica United FC
- LAFC
- 2010–2011: Cosmos Academy West
- 2011–2013: Chivas USA
- 2013–2014: LA Galaxy

Senior career*
Years	Team	Apps	(Gls)
2014–2018	LA Galaxy II	56	(10)
2014–2019	LA Galaxy	42	(4)
2019	→ San Antonio FC (loan)	19	(5)
2020	Vendsyssel FF	12	(1)
2021	Hartford Athletic	13	(1)

International career^{‡}
2012–2013	United States U17	11	(2)
2014–2015	United States U20	15	(5)
- * Club domestic league appearances and goals as of October 31, 2021 ‡ National team caps and goals as of May 17, 2021

Bradford Redder Jamieson IV (born October 18, 1996) is an American former professional soccer player who played as a forward or left winger.

== Youth ==
Bradford Jamieson was born in Los Angeles, California. He began his soccer career at AYSO, progressed to club soccer with Santa Monica United FC, LAFC/Cosmos which was absorbed by Chivas USA Academy and ended his youth career at the LA Galaxy Academy. Jamieson never played for his alma mater, Santa Monica High School, due to USSF Academy rules. He committed to play D1 soccer at UC, Berkeley in the Fall of his senior year, but later opted to sign a professional contract with the L.A. Galaxy, in the winter of his senior year, at age 17. Jamieson was the recipient of the NSCAA "All-America" team award in 2012 and 2013.

== Professional career ==
=== Early career ===
In the fall of 2012, Bradford Jamieson was invited to attend the U.S. Soccer U-17 residency program in Bradenton, Florida, where he would go on & complete four semesters. While a member of the residency program, Jamieson was also a member of the USSF Chivas Academy in Los Angeles. At Chivas, he was given the opportunity to train with the first team, with a nod from Chivas coaches, Robin Fraser and Greg Vanney. He returned to Los Angeles after two years of soccer and study in Bradenton, and joined the L.A. Galaxy academy for his senior year of high school. While an academy player, he was again given the opportunity to train and play with the first team. This led to appearances for the reserve team and ultimately, an MLS player contract offer from Head coach, Bruce Arena. In his senior year, Jamieson began his professional career balancing his academic studies, proms & a professional sports team locker room.

=== LA Galaxy ===
On February 20, 2014, it was announced that Jamieson had signed a homegrown player contract with the LA Galaxy. He then made his professional debut for the LA Galaxy II, the reserve side of the LA Galaxy, in the USL Pro on March 22, 2014, against Orange County Blues. On July 19, 2014, Jamieson made his MLS debut for the L.A. Galaxy first team Sporting Kansas City, coming off the bench replacing A. J. DeLaGarza in the 75th minute. Less than five minutes after coming on, Jamieson provided an assist to Robbie Keane, although the Galaxy could not complete their comeback as they lost 2–1. Jamieson continued to play well for the USL side of the L.A. Galaxy developmental model, while graduating from high school & starting college classes. He would go on to be a 2014 finalist for USL pro "Rookie of the Year", in the Galaxy's inaugural year in the league. Jamieson continued to be an option on the bench for the first team, as they would go on to win the MLS cup that year.

Jamieson scored his first MLS goal for the Galaxy on April 26, 2015, in the ninth minute of a match against the New York Red Bulls at Red Bull Arena in Harrison, New Jersey. Hampered by injuries, Jamieson would complete 2015 with limited play.

=== Vendsyssel FF ===
Following his release from LA Galaxy at the end of the 2019 season, Jamieson moved to Danish 1st Division side Vendsyssel FF on January 31, 2020. He left the club at the end of his contract in August 2020.

=== Hartford Athletic ===
In March 2021, Jamieson joined USL Championship side Hartford Athletic.

== International ==
Bradford began attending U.S. Soccer national team U-15 camps in his freshman year of high school. In the fall of 2011, as a sophomore, Jamieson was invited to attend the U.S. Soccer residency program in Bradenton, Fl. He would complete all four semesters at Bradenton, representing the U.S. at various tournaments worldwide. United States U17. Bradford completed his first year as a professional soccer player and immediately began attending national team camps in preparation for the 2015 CONCACAF Championship(World Cup qualifiers)in Jamaica. A goal scored by Jamieson against Trinidad and Tobago in the 78th minute secured the team's advancement to the CONCACAF playoff for a U20 World cup berth in New Zealand. Jamieson was included in the squad for 2015 FIFA U-20 World Cup in New Zealand, where he scored against the hosts.

== Career statistics ==
As of March 3, 2021

Club	Season	League			U.S. Open Cup		MLS Cup		CONCACAF		Total	
Club	Season	Division	Apps	Goals	Apps	Goals	Apps	Goals	Apps	Goals	Apps	Goals
LA Galaxy II	2014	USL Pro	20	6	1	0	—	—	—	—	21	6
LA Galaxy II	2015	USL	7	3	—	—	—	—	—	—	7	3
LA Galaxy II	2016	USL	17	1	—	—	—	—	—	—	17	1
LA Galaxy II	2017	USL Pro	5	0	0	0	—	—	—	—	5	0
LA Galaxy II	2018	USL	8	0	—	—	—	—	—	—	7	3
San Antonio FC	2019	USL	19	5	1	0	—	—	—	—	20	5
USL Total			76	15	2	0	—	—	—	—	78	15
LA Galaxy	2014	MLS	2	0	—	—	—	—	—	—	2	0
LA Galaxy	2015	MLS	7	1	0	0	0	0	0	0	7	1
LA Galaxy	2016	MLS	3	0	0	0	0	0	0	0	3	0
LA Galaxy	2017	MLS	24	3	3	1	0	0	0	0	27	4
LA Galaxy	2018	MLS	6	0	2	1	0	0	0	0	8	1
LA Galaxy	Total		42	4	5	2	—	—	—	—	49	5
Vendsyssel FF	2020	Danish 1st Division	12	1	-	-	-	-	-	-	12	1
Career total			130	20	7	2	0	0	0	0	137	22

== Honors ==
LA Galaxy

- MLS Cup: 2014
- NSCAA "All America" team 2012, 2013
- MLS Homegrown team. 2014, 2015, 2017
