= Rafael Garcia (soccer, born 1988) =

American soccer player (born 1988)

Personal information
- Full name: Rafael Garcia
- Date of birth: December 19, 1988 (age 37)
- Place of birth: Granada Hills, California, United States
- Height: 1.68 m (5 ft 6 in)
- Position: Midfielder

College career
Years	Team	Apps	(Gls)
2007–2011	Cal State Northridge Matadors		

Senior career*
Years	Team	Apps	(Gls)
2010–2011	FC Hasental	18	(3)
2012–2017	LA Galaxy	45	(0)
2014–2017	LA Galaxy II	27	(4)
2018	New York Cosmos B	12	(2)
2018	Las Vegas Lights	13	(1)
2019–2020	Oklahoma City Energy	42	(6)
- * Club domestic league appearances and goals as of October 6, 2020

Rafael Garcia (born December 19, 1988) is an American former soccer player.

Garcia was recruited by LA Galaxy back in the year 2012 and this last January he signed a new contract extending his position on the team through the year 2017.

== Career ==
Garcia, who describes himself as a hard worker, began his career as a defensive midfielder but started the first two games of the 2017 season at right back. Previously he had captained LA Galaxy II, known colloquially as "Los Dos."

== Honors ==
- MLS Cup: 2012, 2014

== Personal life ==
Garcia is married and has two children.
