= Oscar Sorto =

American soccer player

Personal information
- Full name: Oscar Sorto
- Date of birth: August 8, 1994 (age 32)
- Place of birth: Los Angeles, California, United States
- Height: 1.73 m (5 ft 8 in)
- Position: Defender

Youth career
- 2010–2011: Pateadores
- 2011–2012: LA Galaxy

Senior career*
| Years | Team | Apps | (Gls) |
| 2013–2016 | LA Galaxy | 4 | (0) |
| 2014–2016 | → LA Galaxy II (loan) | 64 | (0) |
| 2017–2018 | Orange County SC | 35 | (0) |
| 2018–2019 | Santa Tecla | 4 | (0) |
| 2019 | Cal FC | | |

International career
| 2013 | United States U20 | 3 | (0) |
| 2014–2015 | United States U23 | 7 | (0) |
- * Club domestic league appearances and goals

Oscar Sorto (born August 8, 1994) is an American professional soccer player.

== Career ==
=== Professional ===
Sorto grew up playing in the U.S. Soccer Development Academy for the Pateadores and LA Galaxy. On April 16, 2012, Sorto signed a letter of intent to play college soccer at California State University, Bakersfield. However, on December 11, he elected to pursue a professional contract and he signed with Los Angeles Galaxy as a homegrown player. On September 25, 2013, Sorto made his professional debut in a 3–0 victory over Costa Rican side Cartaginés in the CONCACAF Champions League.

=== International ===
On May 20, 2013, Sorto was named to the 22-man squad for the 2013 Toulon Tournament where he would make one appearance for the U.S. under-20 national team on June 5 in a 1–0 loss to South Korea. Two days later, Sorto was named to the 21-man squad for the 2013 FIFA U-20 World Cup in Turkey where he made two appearances, one against France and one against Ghana.

He is also eligible to represent El Salvador due to having Salvadoran-born parents and was called up to represent El Salvador for the first time on September 29, 2017.

== Honors ==
LA Galaxy

- MLS Cup: 2014
