= 2014 HJK season =

HJK
2014 season
- Chairman: Olli-Pekka Lyytikäinen
- Manager: Sixten Boström (until 29 April); Mika Lehkosuo (from 29 April)
- Stadium: Sonera Stadium
- Veikkausliiga: Champions
- Finnish Cup: Champions
- League Cup: Semi-final vs SJK
- UEFA Champions League: Third qualifying round vs APOEL
- UEFA Europa League: Group Stage
- Top goalscorer: League: Demba Savage (11); All: Demba Savage (14)
Home colours	Away colours

The 2014 season was Helsingin Jalkapalloklubi's 106th competitive season. HJK is the most successful Finnish football club with 26 Finnish Championships, 11 Finnish Cup titles, 4 Finnish League Cup titles and one appearance in the UEFA Champions League Group Stages.

== Squad ==
As of match played 11 December 2014

No.	Name	Nationality	Position	Date of birth (age)	Signed from	Signed in	Contract ends	Apps.	Goals
Goalkeepers
1	Ville Wallén	(Finland)	GK	20 June 1976 (aged 38)	Jokerit	2003			
12	Toni Doblas	(Spain)	GK	5 August 1980 (aged 34)	Napoli	2014		14	0
13	Carljohan Eriksson	(Finland)	GK	25 April 1995 (aged 19)	Youth Team	2012		5	0
21	Michael Tørnes	(Denmark)	GK	8 January 1986 (aged 28)	Brøndby	2014		28	0
35	Saku-Pekka Sahlgren	(Finland)	GK	8 April 1992 (aged 22)	KPV	2011			
Defenders
2	Alex Lehtinen	(Finland)	DF	9 April 1996 (aged 18)	Youth team	2014		9	0
3	Gideon Baah	(Ghana)	DF	1 October 1991 (aged 23)	Honka	2014		40	6
5	Tapio Heikkilä	(Finland)	DF	8 April 1990 (aged 24)	Honka	2013		76	4
11	Veli Lampi	(Finland)	DF	18 July 1984 (aged 30)	Arsenal Kyiv	2014		36	1
15	Joevin Jones	(Trinidad and Tobago)	DF	3 August 1991 (aged 23)	loan from W Connection	2014		6	0
16	Valtteri Moren	(Finland)	DF	15 June 1991 (aged 23)	Youth Team	2010			
17	Nikolai Alho	(Finland)	DF	12 March 1993 (aged 21)	Youth Team	2012		87	16
40	Sebastian Dolivo	(Finland)	DF	8 November 1996 (aged 18)	Youth Team	2014		1	0
41	Elias Tamburini	(Finland)	DF	1 February 1995 (aged 19)	Youth Team	2014		1	0
Midfielders
4	Mika Väyrynen	(Finland)	MF	28 December 1981 (aged 32)	Leeds United	2012		60	7
6	Markus Heikkinen	(Finland)	MF	13 October 1978 (aged 36)	Start	2014		39	0
7	Sebastian Mannström	(Finland)	MF	29 October 1988 (aged 26)	FF Jaro	2011	2014		
10	Teemu Tainio captain	(Finland)	MF	27 November 1979 (aged 35)	New York Red Bulls	2013		56	3
22	Fredrik Lassas	(Finland)	MF	1 October 1996 (aged 18)	Youth Team	2013		19	0
18	Emerik Grönroos	(Finland)	MF	6 July 1994 (aged 20)	Youth Team	2012		9	0
26	Obed Malolo	(Finland)	MF	18 April 1997 (aged 17)	Youth Team	2014		8	0
27	Sebastian Sorsa	(Finland)	MF	25 January 1984 (aged 30)	Hamilton Academical	2009	2014		
28	Rasmus Schüller	(Finland)	MF	18 June 1991 (aged 21)	Honka	2012	2014	95	13
32	Anthony Annan	(Ghana)	MF	21 July 1986 (aged 28)	Schalke 04	2014		13	0
42	Joel Perovuo	(Finland)	MF	11 August 1985 (aged 29)	Djurgården	2011			
Forwards
8	Demba Savage	(The Gambia)	FW	17 June 1988 (aged 26)	Honka	2012		118	42
30	Aristide Bancé	(Burkina Faso)	FW	19 September 1984 (aged 30)	Augsburg	2014		6	1
31	Robin Lod	(Finland)	FW	17 April 1993 (aged 21)	Youth Team	2011			
33	Roni Porokara	(Finland)	FW	12 December 1983 (aged 30)	Honka	2014		7	1
80	Erfan Zeneli	(Finland)	FW	28 December 1986 (aged 27)	Youth Team	2014			
99	Macoumba Kandji	(Senegal)	FW	2 August 1985 (aged 29)	Levadiakos	2014		38	11
Out on loan
20	Joel Pohjanpalo	(Finland)	FW	13 September 1994 (aged 20)	Youth Team	2011			
Left during the season
9	Mikael Forssell	(Finland)	FW	15 March 1981 (aged 32)	Leeds United	2013			
15	Christian Tveit	(Norway)	FW	10 January 1992 (aged 21)	Start	2014		1	0
15	Oussou Konan Anicet	(Ivory Coast)	FW	23 January 1989 (aged 24)	Gaziantep	2014		21	7
25	Mikko Viitikko	(Finland)	DF	18 April 1995 (aged 18)	Youth Team	2012		4	0
99	Paolo Tornaghi	(Italy)	GK	21 June 1988 (aged 25)	Chicago Fire	2014		1	0

=== Out on loan ===
Note: Flags indicate national team as defined under FIFA eligibility rules; some limited exceptions apply. Players may hold more than one non-FIFA nationality.

No. / Pos. / Nation / Player; 20 / FW / FIN / Joel Pohjanpalo (on loan at Fortuna Düsseldorf)	No. / Pos. / Nation / Player

== Transfers ==
=== Winter ===
In: Note: Flags indicate national team as defined under FIFA eligibility rules; some limited exceptions apply. Players may hold more than one non-FIFA nationality.

No.	Pos.	Nation	Player
3	DF	GHA	Gideon Baah (from (Finland) Honka)
6	DF	FIN	Markus Heikkinen (from (Norway) Start)
8	MF	JAM	Cardel Benbow (Trial)
11	DF	FIN	Veli Lampi (from (Ukraine) Arsenal Kyiv)
15	FW	NOR	Christian Tveit (Trial)
15	FW	CIV	Oussou Konan Anicet (from (Turkey) Gaziantep B.B.)
21	GK	DEN	Michael Tørnes (from (Denmark) Brøndby)
99	FW	SEN	Macoumba Kandji (from (Greece) Levadiakos)
99	GK	ITA	Paolo Tornaghi (Trial)

Out: Note: Flags indicate national team as defined under FIFA eligibility rules; some limited exceptions apply. Players may hold more than one non-FIFA nationality.

No.	Pos.	Nation	Player
2	DF	FIN	Tuomas Kansikas
6	DF	FIN	Timi Lahti (to (Finland) VPS)
8	MF	FIN	Erfan Zeneli (to (Israel) Maccabi Petah Tikva)
21	DF	FIN	Mikko Sumusalo (to (Germany) RB Leipzig)

=== Summer ===
In: Note: Flags indicate national team as defined under FIFA eligibility rules; some limited exceptions apply. Players may hold more than one non-FIFA nationality.

No.	Pos.	Nation	Player
12	GK	ESP	Toni Doblas (from (Italy) Napoli)
14	DF	TTO	Joevin Jones (loan from (Trinidad and Tobago) W Connection)
30	FW	BFA	Aristide Bancé (from (Germany) Augsburg)
32	MF	GHA	Anthony Annan (from (Germany) Schalke 04)
33	MF	FIN	Roni Porokara (from (Finland) Honka)
42	MF	FIN	Joel Perovuo (from (Poland) Jagiellonia Białystok)
80	MF	FIN	Erfan Zeneli (from (Israel) Maccabi Petah Tikva)
—	GK	FIN	Saku-Pekka Sahlgren (from (Finland) RoPS)
—	MF	FIN	Matti Klinga (from (Finland) FC Lahti)

Out: Note: Flags indicate national team as defined under FIFA eligibility rules; some limited exceptions apply. Players may hold more than one non-FIFA nationality.

No.	Pos.	Nation	Player
9	FW	FIN	Mikael Forssell (to (Germany) VfL Bochum)
15	FW	CIV	Oussou Konan Anicet
25	FW	FIN	Mikko Viitikko (to (Finland) VPS)

== Competitions ==
=== Veikkausliiga ===
==== Results summary ====
Overall								Home						Away					
Pld	W	D	L	GF	GA	GD	Pts	W	D	L	GF	GA	GD	W	D	L	GF	GA	GD
33	21	9	3	65	22	+43	72	12	4	1	37	8	+29	9	5	2	28	14	+14

Last updated: 27 May 2015.
Source: Soccerway

==== Results ====
6 April 2014 19	HJK	1 – 0	Jaro	Helsinki
16:00 EEST (UTC+3)	Baah (yellow card) 36'; Tainio 41'	Report	David (yellow card) 65'	Stadium: Sonera Stadium; Attendance: 3,352; Referee: Dennis Antamo

12 April 2014 1	HJK	3 – 1	KuPS	Helsinki
16:00 EEST (UTC+3)	Baah (yellow card) 10'; Kandji 28'; Lod 39'; Forssell 57' (pen.); Tainio (yellow card) 82'; Alho (yellow card) 90+2'	Report	Ilo 5'; Maanoja (yellow card) 56'; Colley (yellow card) 72'	Stadium: Sonera Stadium; Attendance: 3,284; Referee: Dennis Antamo

19 April 2014 2	Lahti	3 – 1	HJK	Lahti
16:00 EEST (UTC+3)	Shala 7', 45+1' (yellow card) 45'; Hauhia 45'	Report	Väyrynen (yellow card) 36'; Baah 44'	Stadium: Lahti Stadium; Attendance: 4,512; Referee: Marko Grönholm

22 April 2014 3	HJK	2 – 2	Honka	Helsinki
18:30 EEST (UTC+3)	Forssell 6'; Alho 56'	Report	Porokara 45'; Hetemaj 53'	Stadium: Sonera Stadium; Attendance: 7,363; Referee: Ville Nevalainen

26 April 2014 4	HJK	0 – 1	TPS	Helsinki
16:00 EEST (UTC+3)	Baah (yellow card) 66'	Report	Brown 9'; Lehtovaara (yellow card) 64'; Jovanović (yellow card) 68'	Stadium: Sonera Stadium; Attendance: 3,105; Referee: Mikka Lähdesmäki

4 May 2014 5	VPS	0 – 2	HJK	Vaasa
18:30 EEST (UTC+3)	Strandvall (yellow card) 53'; T.Honkaniemi (yellow card) 90'	Report	Mannström 43', 57'; Tørnes (yellow card) 90'	Stadium: Hietalahti Stadium; Attendance: 2,392; Referee: Dennis Antamo

8 May 2014 6	HJK	1 – 0	IFK Mariehamn	Helsinki
18:30 EEST (UTC+3)	Savage 90+7'	Report		Stadium: Sonera Stadium; Attendance: 3,352; Referee: Marko Grönholm

12 May 2014 7	RoPS	0 – 1	HJK	Rovaniemi
18:30 EEST (UTC+3)	Lahtinen (yellow card) 44'; Mäkitalo (yellow card) 65'	Report	N.Alison 51' (o.g.); Baah (yellow card) 64'; Schüller (yellow card) 87'	Stadium: Keskuskenttä; Attendance: 1,636; Referee: Vesa Hätilä

16 May 2014 8	HJK	4 – 0	MYPA	Helsinki
18:30 EEST (UTC+3)	Kandji 31'; Lampi 42'; Alho 46'; Schüller 80'	Report		Stadium: Sonera Stadium; Attendance: 7,011; Referee: Mattias Gestranius

26 May 2014 10	HJK	1 – 0	SJK	Helsinki
18:30 EEST (UTC+3)	Kandji 88'	Report	Laaksonen (yellow card) 79'	Stadium: Sonera Stadium; Attendance: 6,011; Referee: Vesa Hätilä

4 June 2014 9	Inter Turku	0 – 2	HJK	Turku
18:30 EEST (UTC+3)	Marinković (yellow card) 45+2'; Kauppi (yellow card) 54' (yellow-red card) 78'	Report	Mannström (yellow card) 45'; Forssell 66'; Kandji 81'	Stadium: Veritas Stadion; Attendance: 3,139; Referee: Petteri Kari

8 June 2014 11	Jaro	0 – 2	HJK	Jakobstad
18:30 EEST (UTC+3)	Vaganov (yellow card) 63'; Opiyo (yellow card) 64'; Emet (yellow card) 68'	Report	Kandji 7' (yellow card) 27'; F.Lassas (yellow card) 45+1'; Alho (yellow card) 53'; Väyrynen (yellow card) 56'; Savage 90+5'	Stadium: Jakobstads Centralplan; Attendance: 2,364; Referee: Ville Nevalainen

11 June 2014 12	RoPS	0 – 0	HJK	Rovaniemi
18:30 EEST (UTC+3)	L.Nurmos (yellow card) 65'	Report		Stadium: Keskuskenttä; Attendance: 1,865; Referee: Marko Grönholm

14 June 2014 13	HJK	3 – 0	VPS	Helsinki
17:00 EEST (UTC+3)	Savage (yellow card) 38' (goal) 68'; Alho 48' (yellow card) 66'; Lod 80'	Report	T.Honkaniemi (yellow card) 47'; T.Kula (yellow card) 60'	Stadium: Sonera Stadium; Attendance: 3,937; Referee: Jari Järvinen

18 June 2014 14	Honka	1 – 1	HJK	Tapiola
18:30 EEST (UTC+3)	A.Mboma 70'; Sow (yellow card) 78'	Report	Kandji 58'	Stadium: Tapiolan Urheilupuisto; Attendance: 2,751; Referee: Petteri Kari

23 June 2014 15	HJK	5 – 0	TPS	Helsinki
18:30 EEST (UTC+3)	Heikkilä 8'; Forssell 15'; Savage 29', 35'; Lod 50'	Report	Agyiri (yellow card) 80'	Stadium: Sonera Stadium; Attendance: 3,425; Referee: Mikka Lähdesmäki

27 June 2014 16	IFK Mariehamn	0 – 2	HJK	Mariehamn
18:30 EEST (UTC+3)	Tammilehto (yellow card) 87'	Report	Kandji (yellow card) 60'; Alho (yellow card) 71' (goal) 88'; Väyrynen (yellow card) 84'; Konan (yellow card) 90' (goal) 90'	Stadium: Wiklöf Holding Arena; Attendance: 1,502; Referee: Dennis Antamo

2 July 2014 17	HJK	0 – 0	Lahti	Helsinki
18:30 EEST (UTC+3)	Heikkilä (yellow card) 80'; Savage (yellow card) 90+2'	Report	L.Hertsi (yellow card) 50'; Joenmäki (yellow card) 90+2'; Moisander (yellow card) 90+2'	Stadium: Sonera Stadium; Attendance: 4,802; Referee: Ville Nevalainen

6 July 2014 18	KuPS	2 – 2	HJK	Kuopio
18:30 EEST (UTC+3)	Purje 44', 85' (pen.)	Report	Alho 10'; Savage 31'	Stadium: Savon Sanomat Areena; Attendance: 3,679; Referee: Tero Nieminen

19 July 2014 20	HJK	2 – 0	SJK	Helsinki
16:00 EEST (UTC+3)	Heikkinen (yellow card) 16'; Forssell 29' (pen.); Konan 31' (yellow card) 32'; Baah (yellow card) 43'	Report		Stadium: Sonera Stadium; Attendance: 3,690; Referee: Petteri Kari

26 July 2014 21	Inter Turku	3 – 3	HJK	Turku
17:00 EEST (UTC+3)	V.Onovo 33'; Kauppi (yellow card) 41'; Lindström 62' (yellow card) 83'; Duah (yellow card) 67'; Bahne (yellow card) 80'; B.Miftari 83'	Report	Forssell 11'; Sorsa 64'; L.Lassas (yellow card) 79'; Savage 81' (pen.)	Stadium: Veritas Stadion; Attendance: 2,136; Referee: Jari Järvinen

2 August 2014 22	MYPA	0 – 1	HJK	Kouvola
16:00 EEST (UTC+3)	Pirinen (yellow card) 61'; Aho (yellow card) 90+3'	Report	Lod 42'; Lampi (yellow card) 51'; Väyrynen (yellow card) 59'; Savage (yellow card) 90+6'	Stadium: Kymenlaakson Sähkö Stadion; Attendance: 1,849; Referee: Jani Laaksonen

13 August 2014 24	HJK	2 – 0	Inter Turku	Helsinki
18:30 EEST (UTC+3)	Alho 65'; Forssell 90'	Report	Suárez (yellow card) 24'; Lehtonen (yellow card) 50'	Stadium: Sonera Stadium; Attendance: 3,821; Referee: Vesa Hätilä

24 August 2014 25	SJK	2 – 0	HJK	Seinäjoki
18:30 EEST (UTC+3)	Laaksonen (yellow card) 26'; Pelvas 59', 86' (pen.)	Report	Baah (yellow card) 40'; Konan (yellow card) 55'	Stadium: Seinäjoen keskuskenttä Attendance: 4,079; Referee: Dennis Antamo

31 August 2014 26	Jaro	1 – 4	HJK	Jakobstad
18:30 EEST (UTC+3)	Winchester (yellow card) 47'; Helmke 52'	Report	Heikkilä (yellow card) 26'; Mannström 32' (yellow card) 45'; Baah 72'; Konan 84', 90+3'	Stadium: Jakobstads Centralplan; Attendance: 1,696; Referee: Jari Järvinen

12 September 2014 27	HJK	2 – 2	KuPS	Helsinki
18:30 EEST (UTC+3)	Doblas (yellow card) 36'; Heikkilä 67', 88'; Baah (yellow card) 90+1'	Report	Hakola 17'; Sohna (yellow card) 55'; Ilo 90'	Stadium: Sonera Stadium; Attendance: 4,152; Referee: Mattias Gestranius

21 September 2014 29	HJK	5 – 1	IFK Mariehamn	Helsinki
18:30 EEST (UTC+3)	Savage 42', 71', 73'; Bancé 57'; Väyrynen 68'	Report	Forsell (yellow card) 44' (goal) 45+1' (pen.)	Stadium: Sonera Stadium; Attendance: 2852; Referee: Petteri Kari

25 September 2014 28	Lahti	0 – 2	HJK	Lahti
18:30 EEST (UTC+3)	Gela (yellow card) 68'	Report	Savage (yellow card) 61'; Lod 89'; Porokara 90+2'	Stadium: Lahti Stadium; Attendance: 2,351; Referee: Mattias Gestranius

28 September 2014 30	TPS	1 – 4	HJK	Turku
17:00 EEST (UTC+3)	Lomski 49'	Report	Väyrynen 27'; Zeneli 78' (pen.), 81'; Lod 84'	Stadium: Veritas Stadion; Attendance: 1,915; Referee: Dennis Antamo

5 October 2014 31	HJK	1 – 1	Honka	Helsinki
18:30 EEST (UTC+3)	Savage 34'	Report	Rexhepi (yellow card) 66'; Mäkijärvi 90+3'	Stadium: Sonera Stadium; Attendance: 3,421; Referee: Jari Järvinen

16 October 2014 23	HJK	2 – 0	MYPA	Helsinki
18:30 EEST (UTC+3)	Zeneli 2'; Alho 88'	Report		Stadium: Sonera Stadium; Attendance: 1,502; Referee: Vesa Hätilä

19 October 2014 32	VPS	1 – 1	HJK	Vaasa
14:00 EEST (UTC+3)	Strandvall 52'	Report	Mannström 30'	Stadium: Hietalahti Stadium; Attendance: 1,663; Referee: Petteri Kari

26 October 2014 33	HJK	3 – 0 Awarded	RoPS	Helsinki
14:00 EEST (UTC+3)	Savage (yellow card) 48'; Annan (yellow card) 54'; Moren (yellow card) 54'	Report	S.Roiha 52'; Gay (yellow card) 54' (yellow-red card) 54'; Okkonen 69' (pen.); N.Alison (yellow card) 79'; Nyassi 89'	Stadium: Sonera Stadium; Referee: Tero Nieminen

==== League table ====
Pos	Team	Pld	W	D	L	GF	GA	GD	Pts	Qualification or relegation
1	HJK (C)	33	21	9	3	65	22	+43	72	Qualification to Champions League second qualifying round
2	SJK	33	16	11	6	40	26	+14	59	Qualification to Europa League first qualifying round
3	FC Lahti	33	15	13	5	45	23	+22	58	Qualification to Europa League first qualifying round
4	VPS	33	13	9	11	39	34	+5	48	Qualification to Europa League first qualifying round
5	IFK Mariehamn	33	14	6	13	49	55	−6	48	

Source: veikkausliiga.com
Rules for classification: 1) Points; 2) Goal difference; 3) Number of goals scored
(C) Champions

=== Finnish Cup ===
16 April 2014 Sixth Round	HJK	2 – 0	RoPS	Helsinki
19:00 EEST (UTC+3)	Kandji 8'; Baah 15'	Summary	Okkonen (yellow card) 42'; Gay (yellow card) 48'	Stadium: Sonera Stadium; Attendance: 1,052; Referee: Dennis Antamo

30 April 2014 Quarterfinal	Haka	0 – 3	HJK	Valkeakoski
17:30 EEST (UTC+3)	Nooitmeer (yellow card) 38'	Report	Oussou 58'; Lod 75'; Tainio (yellow card) 77'; Alho 88'	Stadium: Tehtaan kenttä Attendance: 1,935; Referee: Ville Nevalainen

16 August 2014 Semifinal	IFK Mariehamn	1 – 2	HJK	Mariehamn
19:00 EEST (UTC+3)	Solignac 70'	Report	Baah 29'; Kandji 51'	Stadium: Wiklöf Holding Arena; Attendance: 1,109; Referee: Petteri Kari

1 November 2014 Final	HJK	0 – 0 (5 – 3 p)	FC Inter	Helsinki
16:00 EET (UTC+2)	Annan (yellow card) 17'; Kandji (yellow card) 120'	Report		Stadium: Sonera Stadium; Attendance: 2,349; Referee: Ville Nevalainen
	Penalties
	Kandji (penalty scored); Perovuo (penalty scored); Väyrynen (penalty scored); Baah (penalty scored); Savage (penalty scored)		Ojala (penalty scored); Aho (penalty scored); Nyman (penalty missed); Gruborovics (penalty scored)

=== League Cup ===
==== Group stage ====
Pos	Team	Pld	W	D	L	GF	GA	GD	Pts
1	FC Honka	4	1	3	0	6	5	+1	6
2	HJK	4	1	2	1	6	7	−1	5
3	RoPS	4	1	1	2	4	4	0	4

Updated to match(es) played on 23 November 2013. Source: veikkausliiga.com
Rules for classification: 1) points 2) head-to-head points 3) head-to-head goal difference 4) head-to-head number of goals scored 5) goal difference 6) number of goals scored

30 January 2014 1	HJK	2 – 0	RoPS	Helsinki
17:00 EET (UTC+2)	Sorsa 44'; Alho 81' (yellow card) 88'	Report		Stadium: Tali Halli; Referee: Dennis Antamo

5 February 2014 2	Honka	1 – 1	HJK	Espoo
15:00 EET (UTC+2)	Anyamele 58'	Report	Schüller 42'	Stadium: Ratiopharm Areena; Referee: Marko Grönholm

20 February 2014 3	HJK	3 – 3	Honka	Helsinki
17:00 EET (UTC+2)	Forssell 21', 51', 87' (pen.); Alho (yellow card) 53'; R.Peiponen (yellow card) 60'; F.Lassas (yellow card) 71'	Report	Porokara 4'; M.Kolsi (yellow card) 39' (yellow-red card) 50'; Hetemaj 61'; Mombilo 65'	Stadium: Tali Halli; Referee: Jari Järvinen

28 February 2014 4	RoPS	3 – 0	HJK	Rovaniemi
18:00 EET (UTC+2)	Pennanen (yellow card) 38'; Otaru 66'; Mäkitalo 71'; Saxman 75'	Report	C.Eriksson (yellow card) 5'; Alho (yellow card) 41'; Baah (yellow card) 45+1'	Stadium: Ounashalli; Referee: Toni Pohjoismäki

==== Knockout stages ====
8 March 2014 Quarterfinal	Inter Turku	1 – 3	HJK	Espoo
14:00 EET (UTC+2)	Marinkovic (yellow card) 70' (goal) 82'	Report	Konan 17', 62'; Forssell 19'; Alho (yellow card) 70'; Lod (yellow card) 71'	Stadium: Tapiolan Urheilupuisto; Referee: Ville Nevalainen

15 March 2014 Semifinal	SJK	1 – 0	HJK	Seinäjoki
14:00 EET (UTC+2)	T.Penninkangas (yellow card) 25'; Currais 50'; C.López (yellow card) 56'; Matrone (yellow card) 76'	Report	E.Tamburini (yellow card) 19'; S.Hirvonen (yellow card) 54'; R.Peiponen (yellow card) 81'	Stadium: Wallsport Areena; Referee: Vesa Hätilä

=== UEFA Champions League ===
==== Qualifying phase ====
15 July 2014 2nd Qualifying Round 1st leg	Rabotnicki (North Macedonia)	0 – 0	(Finland) HJK	Skopje, Macedonia
21:00 EEST (UTC+3)	Vujčić (yellow card) 44'; Siljanovski (yellow card) 45+1'; D.Najdoski (yellow card) 85'	Report		Stadium: Philip II Arena; Attendance: 1,500; Referee: Tamás Bognar (Hungary)

23 July 2014 2nd Qualifying Round 2nd leg	HJK (Finland)	2 – 1 (2 – 1 agg.)	(North Macedonia) Rabotnicki	Helsinki, Finland
19:00 EEST (UTC+3)	Sorsa (yellow card) 17'; Lod 22'; Moren 26'; Heikkinen (yellow card) 56'	Report	Vujcic 47'; Siljanovski (yellow card) 50'; D.Najdoski (yellow card) 55'	Stadium: Sonera Stadium; Attendance: 10,153; Referee: Neil Doyle (Republic of Ireland)

30 July 2014 3rd Qualifying Round 1st leg	HJK (Finland)	2 – 2	(Cyprus) APOEL	Helsinki, Finland
19:00 EEST (UTC+3)	Savage 11', 45+1'; Kandji (yellow card) 41' (yellow-red card) 49'	Report	João Guilherme (yellow card) 13'; Antoniades (yellow card) 40'; Carlão (yellow card) 44'; De Vincenti 71'; Sheridan 74'; Mário Sérgio (yellow card) 87'	Stadium: Sonera Stadium; Attendance: 10,189; Referee: Pawel Gil (Poland)

6 August 2014 3rd Qualifying Round 2nd leg	APOEL (Cyprus)	2 – 0 (4 – 2 agg.)	(Finland) HJK	Nicosia, Cyprus
19:30 EEST (UTC+3)	Cillian Sheridan 17'; Tomas De Vincenti 43'; Carlão (yellow card) 68'	Report		Stadium: GSP Stadium; Attendance: 14,271; Referee: Liran Liany (Israel)

=== UEFA Europa League ===
==== Qualifying phase ====
21 August 2014 Play-off 1st leg	HJK (Finland)	2 – 1	(Austria) Rapid Wien	Helsinki, Finland
19:00 EEST (UTC+3)	Lod 63'; Väyrynen 74'; Heikkinen (yellow card) 80'	Report	Dibon (yellow card) 28'; Schaub 58' (yellow card) 64'	Stadium: Sonera Stadium; Attendance: 6,153; Referee: Halis Özkahya (Turkey)

28 August 2014 Play-off 2nd leg	Rapid Wien (Austria)	3 – 3 (4 – 5 agg.)	(Finland) HJK	Vienna, Austria
21:30 EEST (UTC+3)	Schaub 10', 13'; Schwab (yellow card) 65'; Pavelic (yellow card) 87'; Wydra 90+4'	Report	Kandji 15'; Schüller (yellow card) 60'; Alho 77' (yellow card) 90+3'; Doblas (yellow card) 83'; Savage 88' (pen.)	Stadium: Ernst Happel Stadion; Attendance: 21,100; Referee: Stéphane Lannoy (France)

==== Group stage ====
Pos	Team	Pld	W	D	L	GF	GA	GD	Pts	Qualification	BRU	TOR	HJK	KOB
1	(Belgium) Club Brugge	6	3	3	0	10	2	+8	12	Advance to knockout phase	—	0–0	2–1	1–1
2	(Italy) Torino	6	3	2	1	9	3	+6	11	Advance to knockout phase	0–0	—	2–0	1–0
3	(Finland) HJK	6	2	0	4	5	11	−6	6		0–3	2–1	—	2–1
4	(Denmark) Copenhagen	6	1	1	4	5	13	−8	4		0–4	1–5	2–0	—

Source: Soccerway

18 September 2014 1	Copenhagen (Denmark)	2 – 0	(Finland) HJK	Copenhagen, Denmark
20:00 EEST (UTC+3)	N. Jørgensen 68', 81'	Report	Annan (yellow card) 33'; Heikkinen (yellow card) 62'	Stadium: Parken Stadium; Attendance: 12,191; Referee: Yevhen Aranovskiy (Ukraine)

2 October 2014 2	HJK (Finland)	0 – 3	(Belgium) Club Brugge	Helsinki, Finland
22:05 EEST (UTC+3)	Tainio (yellow card) 19'	Report	Heikkinen 18' (o.g.); Fernando (yellow card) 43'; De Sutter 70'; De Bock 78'	Stadium: Sonera Stadium; Attendance: 8,055; Referee: Ognjen Valjic (Bosnia and Herzegovina)

23 October 2014 3	Torino (Italy)	2 – 0	(Finland) HJK	Turin, Italy
22:05 EEST (UTC+3)	Molinaro 35'; Amauri 58'; Quagliarella (yellow card) 68'	Report	Annan (yellow card) 43'; Savage (yellow card) 83'; Kandji (yellow card) 85'	Stadium: Stadio Olimpico; Attendance: 10,000; Referee: Stephan Klossner (Switzerland)

6 November 2014 4	HJK (Finland)	2 – 1	(Italy) Torino	Helsinki, Finland
20:00 EEST (UTC+3)	Baah 60'; Moren 81'; Annan (yellow card) 90+5'	Report	El Kaddouri (yellow card) 83'; Quagliarella 90'	Stadium: Sonera Stadium; Attendance: 6,562; Referee: Arnold Hunter (Northern Ireland)

27 November 2014 5	HJK (Finland)	2 – 1	(Denmark) Copenhagen	Helsinki, Finland
22:05 EEST (UTC+3)	Baah 29'; Doblas (yellow card) 90'; Kandji 90+3' (yellow card) 90+4'	Report	Høgli (yellow card) 41'; Gíslason (yellow card) 64'; Nilsson 90'	Stadium: Sonera Stadium; Attendance: 6,752; Referee: Tony Chapron (France)

11 December 2014 6	Club Brugge (Belgium)	2 – 1	(Finland) HJK	Bruges, Belgium
20:00 EEST (UTC+3)	Felipe Gedoz 28' (pen.); Fernando (yellow card) 34'; De Sutter (yellow card) 71'; Refaelov 88'	Report	Baah (yellow card) 10'; Kandji 51'	Stadium: Jan Breydel Stadium; Attendance: 15,000; Referee: Sergei Karasev (Russia)

== Squad statistics ==
As of Match played 11 December 2014

=== Appearances and goals ===
No.	Pos	Nat	Player	Total		Veikkausliiga		Finnish Cup		League Cup		UEFA Champions League		UEFA Europa League	
No.	Pos	Nat	Player	Apps	Goals	Apps	Goals	Apps	Goals	Apps	Goals	Apps	Goals	Apps	Goals
1	GK	(Finland) FIN	Ville Wallén	1	0	0	0	0	0	1	0	0	0	0	0
3	DF	(Ghana) GHA	Gideon Baah	40	6	23+2	2	4	2	2	0	0+3	0	5+1	2
4	MF	(Finland) FIN	Mika Väyrynen	38	3	21+4	2	2+1	0	0	0	2+2	0	5+1	1
5	DF	(Finland) FIN	Tapio Heikkilä	39	3	26+2	3	3	0	4	0	0	0	0+4	0
6	MF	(Finland) FIN	Markus Heikkinen	39	0	20+3	0	4	0	1	0	4	0	7	0
7	FW	(Finland) FIN	Sebastian Mannström	33	4	16+9	4	1+1	0	3+1	0	0+2	0	0	0
8	FW	(The Gambia) GAM	Demba Savage	40	14	19+5	11	2+1	0	3	0	4	2	6	1
10	MF	(Finland) FIN	Teemu Tainio	30	1	14+2	1	3	0	2	0	4	0	5	0
11	DF	(Finland) FIN	Veli Lampi	36	1	21+2	1	2	0	1	0	4	0	6	0
12	GK	(Spain) ESP	Toni Doblas	14	0	5	0	1	0	0	0	0	0	8	0
15	DF	(Trinidad and Tobago) TTO	Joevin Jones	6	0	5+1	0	0	0	0	0	0	0	0	0
16	DF	(Finland) FIN	Valtteri Moren	41	2	25	0	1+1	0	4	0	4	1	6	1
17	DF	(Finland) FIN	Nikolai Alho	38	10	15+7	7	1+1	1	5	1	4	0	3+2	1
21	GK	(Denmark) DEN	Michael Tørnes	28	0	22	0	2	0	0	0	4	0	0	0
24	MF	(Finland) FIN	Joel Perovuo	17	0	8+2	0	1+1	0	0	0	0	0	1+4	0
27	DF	(Finland) FIN	Sebastian Sorsa	36	2	10+9	1	1+1	0	3	1	4	0	8	0
28	MF	(Finland) FIN	Rasmus Schüller	24	2	10+1	1	0+2	0	4	1	3+1	0	2+1	0
30	FW	(Burkina Faso) BFA	Aristide Bancé	6	1	2+2	1	0	0	0	0	0	0	2	0
31	MF	(Finland) FIN	Robin Lod	49	9	24+4	6	4	1	4+1	0	4	1	8	1
32	MF	(Ghana) GHA	Anthony Annan	13	0	4+3	0	1	0	0	0	0	0	5	0
33	FW	(Finland) FIN	Roni Porokara	7	1	2+2	1	0	0	0	0	0	0	1+2	0
80	FW	(Finland) FIN	Erfan Zeneli	19	3	8+1	3	2	0	0	0	0	0	4+4	0
99	FW	(Senegal) SEN	Macoumba Kandji	38	11	19+5	6	3	2	0	0	3	0	6+2	3
Players from Klubi-04 who appeared:
1	GK	(Finland) FIN	Valtteri Hirvonen	1	0	0	0	0	0	1	0	0	0	0	0
2	DF	(Finland) FIN	Alex Lehtinen	9	0	4+3	0	0	0	2	0	0	0	0	0
13	GK	(Finland) FIN	Carljohan Eriksson	5	0	0	0	1	0	3	0	0	0	0+1	0
18	MF	(Finland) FIN	Emerik Grönroos	7	0	0+2	0	1+1	0	3	0	0	0	0	0
22	MF	(Finland) FIN	Fredrik Lassas	18	0	9+5	0	2	0	1+1	0	0	0	0	0
26	MF	(Finland) FIN	Obed Malolo	8	0	0+4	0	0	0	2+2	0	0	0	0	0
40	DF	(Finland) FIN	Sebastian Dolivo	1	0	0	0	0	0	1	0	0	0	0	0
41	DF	(Finland) FIN	Elias Tamburini	1	0	0	0	0	0	1	0	0	0	0	0
42	MF	(Finland) FIN	Santeri Hirvonen	1	0	0	0	0	0	1	0	0	0	0	0
43	MF	(Finland) FIN	Roni Peiponen	3	0	0	0	0	0	2+1	0	0	0	0	0
47	MF	(Finland) FIN	Fidel Hayes	1	0	0	0	0	0	0+1	0	0	0	0	0
49	MF	(Finland) FIN	Matias Pyysalo	3	0	0	0	0	0	2+1	0	0	0	0	0
54	MF	(Finland) FIN	Omar Khary	1	0	0	0	0	0	1	0	0	0	0	0
55	FW	(Finland) FIN	Tim Tuomikoski	1	0	0	0	0	0	1	0	0	0	0	0
56	FW	(Finland) FIN	Karim Jouini	1	0	0	0	0	0	1	0	0	0	0	0
57	FW	(Finland) FIN	Aleksander Akbar	1	0	0	0	0	0	0+1	0	0	0	0	0
76	MF	(Finland) FIN	Arash Shirkhani	1	0	0	0	0	0	0+1	0	0	0	0	0
Players who left HJK during the season:
9	FW	(Finland) FIN	Mikael Forssell	24	11	14+3	7	0+1	0	4+1	4	0+1	0	0	0
15	FW	(Norway) NOR	Christian Tveit	1	0	0	0	0	0	1	0	0	0	0	0
15	FW	(Ivory Coast) CIV	Oussou Konan Anicet	21	7	8+10	4	2	1	1	2	0	0	0	0
25	FW	(Finland) FIN	Mikko Viitikko	4	0	3	0	0+1	0	0	0	0	0	0	0
99	GK	(Italy) ITA	Paolo Tornaghi	1	0	0	0	0	0	1	0	0	0	0	0

=== Goal scorers ===
Place	Position	Nation	Number	Name	Veikkausliiga	Finnish Cup	League Cup	UEFA Champions League	UEFA Europa League	Total
1	FW	(The Gambia)	8	Demba Savage	11	0	0	2	1	14
2	FW	(Finland)	9	Mikael Forssell	7	0	4	0	0	11
2	FW	(Senegal)	99	Macoumba Kandji	6	2	0	0	3	11
4	MF	(Finland)	17	Nikolai Alho	7	1	1	0	1	10
5	MF	(Finland)	31	Robin Lod	6	1	0	1	1	9
6	FW	(Ivory Coast)	15	Oussou Konan Anicet	4	1	2	0	0	7
7	DF	(Ghana)	3	Gideon Baah	2	2	0	0	2	6
8	FW	(Finland)	7	Sebastian Mannström	4	0	0	0	0	4
9	DF	(Finland)	5	Tapio Heikkilä	3	0	0	0	0	3
9	FW	(Finland)	80	Erfan Zeneli	3	0	0	0	0	3
9	MF	(Finland)	4	Mika Väyrynen	2	0	0	0	1	3
12	FW	(Finland)	28	Rasmus Schüller	1	0	1	0	0	2
12	DF	(Finland)	27	Sebastian Sorsa	1	0	1	0	0	2
12	DF	(Finland)	16	Valtteri Moren	0	0	0	1	1	2
15	MF	(Finland)	10	Teemu Tainio	1	0	0	0	0	1
15	DF	(Finland)	11	Veli Lampi	1	0	0	0	0	1
15	FW	(Burkina Faso)	30	Aristide Bancé	1	0	0	0	0	1
15	FW	(Finland)	33	Roni Porokara	1	0	0	0	0	1
15				Own goal	1	0	0	0	0	1
				Awarded goals	3	0	0	0	0	3
				TOTALS	65	7	9	4	10	95

=== Clean Sheets ===
Place	Position	Nation	Number	Name	Veikkausliiga	Finnish Cup	League Cup	UEFA Champions League	UEFA Europa League	Total
1	GK	(Denmark)	21	Michael Tørnes	15	2	0	1	0	18
2	GK	(Spain)	12	Toni Doblas	2	1	0	0	0	3
3	GK	(Finland)	13	Carljohan Eriksson	1	0	1	0	0	2
				TOTALS	18	3	1	1	0	23

=== Disciplinary record ===
Number	Nation	Position	Name	Veikkausliiga		Finnish Cup		League Cup		UEFA Champions League		UEFA Europa League		Total	
Number	Nation	Position	Name	Yellow card	Red card	Yellow card	Red card	Yellow card	Red card	Yellow card	Red card	Yellow card	Red card	Yellow card	Red card
3	(Ghana)	DF	Gideon Baah	7	0	0	0	1	0	0	0	1	0	9	0
4	(Finland)	MF	Mika Väyrynen	4	0	0	0	0	0	0	0	0	0	4	0
5	(Finland)	DF	Tapio Heikkilä	2	0	0	0	0	0	0	0	0	0	2	0
6	(Finland)	DF	Markus Heikkinen	1	0	0	0	0	0	1	0	2	0	4	0
7	(Finland)	FW	Sebastian Mannström	2	0	0	0	0	0	0	0	0	0	2	0
8	(The Gambia)	FW	Demba Savage	5	0	0	0	0	0	0	0	1	0	6	0
10	(Finland)	MF	Teemu Tainio	1	0	1	0	0	0	0	0	1	0	3	0
11	(Finland)	DF	Veli Lampi	1	0	0	0	0	0	0	0	0	0	1	0
12	(Spain)	GK	Toni Doblas	1	0	0	0	0	0	0	0	2	0	3	0
13	(Finland)	GK	Carljohan Eriksson	0	0	0	0	1	0	0	0	0	0	1	0
16	(Finland)	DF	Valtteri Moren	1	0	0	0	0	0	0	0	0	0	1	0
17	(Finland)	MF	Nikolai Alho	4	0	0	0	4	0	0	0	1	0	9	0
21	(Denmark)	GK	Michael Tørnes	1	0	0	0	0	0	0	0	0	0	1	0
22	(Finland)	MF	Fredrik Lassas	2	0	0	0	1	0	0	0	0	0	3	0
27	(Finland)	DF	Sebastian Sorsa	0	0	0	0	0	0	1	0	0	0	1	0
28	(Finland)	MF	Rasmus Schüller	1	0	0	0	0	0	0	0	1	0	1	0
31	(Finland)	MF	Robin Lod	0	0	0	0	1	0	0	0	0	0	1	0
32	(Ghana)	MF	Anthony Annan	1	0	1	0	0	0	0	0	3	0	5	0
41	(Finland)	DF	Elias Tamburini	0	0	0	0	1	0	0	0	0	0	1	0
42	(Finland)	GK	Santeri Hirvonen	0	0	0	0	1	0	0	0	0	0	1	0
43	(Finland)	DF	Roni Peiponen	0	0	0	0	2	0	0	0	0	0	2	0
99	(Senegal)	FW	Macoumba Kandji	2	0	1	0	0	0	2	1	2	0	7	1
Players away on loan:
Players who left HJK during the season:
15	(Ivory Coast)	FW	Oussou Konan Anicet	3	0	0	0	0	0	0	0	0	0	3	0
			TOTALS	39	0	3	0	12	0	4	1	14	0	72	1
