= Sebastian Lletget =

American soccer player (born 1992)

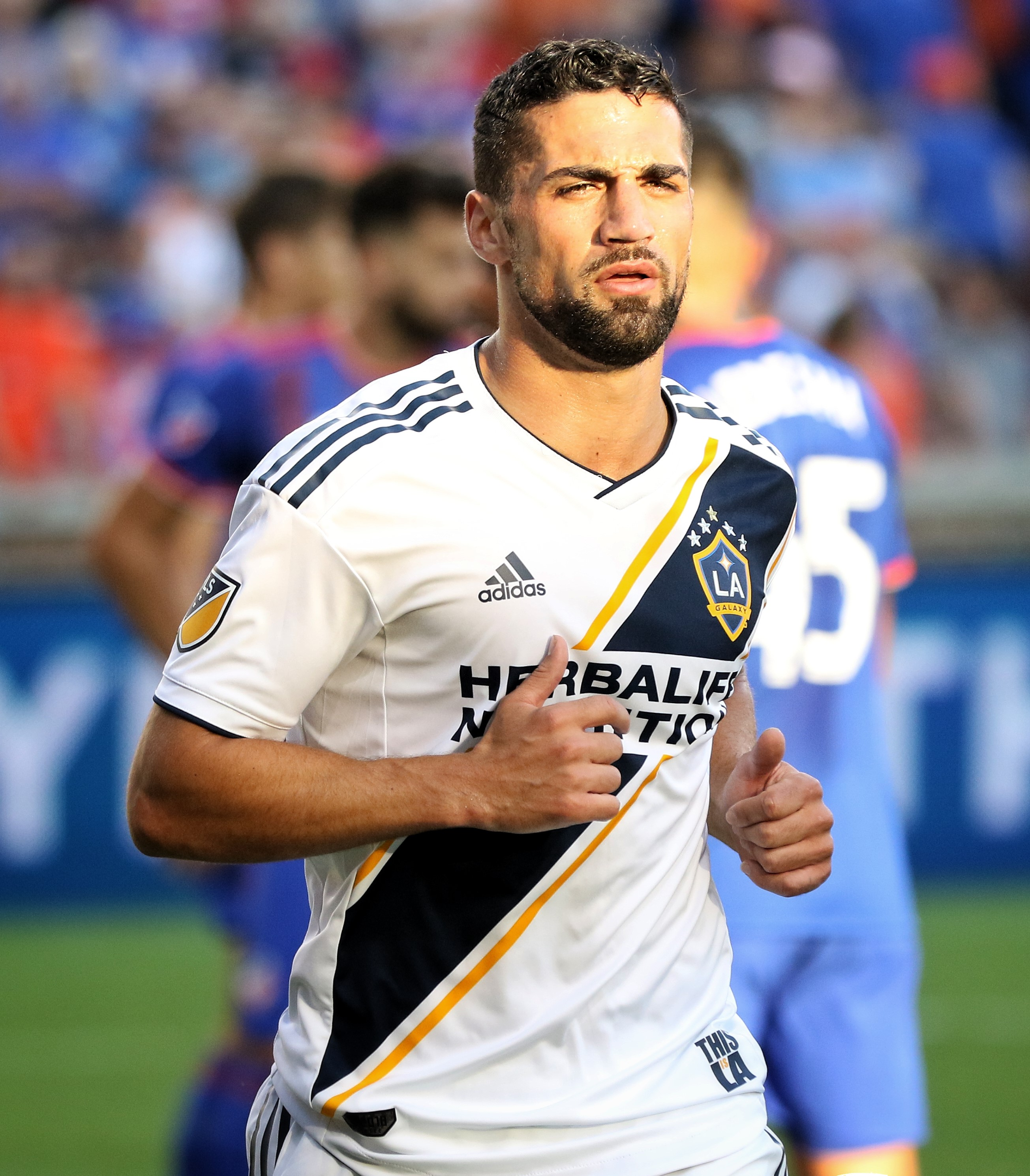
- Lletget with LA Galaxy in 2019

Personal information
- Full name: Sebastian Francisco Lletget
- Date of birth: September 3, 1992 (age 34)
- Place of birth: San Francisco, California, US
- Height: 5 ft 10 in (1.78 m)
- Position: Midfielder

Team information
- Current team: Monterey Bay FC
- Number: 88

Youth career
- Santa Clara Sporting
- 2009–2013: West Ham United

Senior career*
Years	Team	Apps	(Gls)
2013–2015	West Ham United	0	(0)
2015–2021	LA Galaxy	158	(23)
2015	LA Galaxy II	1	(0)
2022	New England Revolution	19	(2)
2022–2025	FC Dallas	80	(4)
2026–	Monterey Bay FC	28	(7)

International career^{‡}
2009	United States U17	7	(3)
2011	United States U20	3	(0)
2011	United States U23	1	(0)
2017–2021	United States	33	(8)
Medal record
Representing United States
Men's soccer
CONCACAF Nations League
Winner	2021 United States
CONCACAF Gold Cup
Winner	2021 United States
- * Club domestic league appearances and goals as of November 8, 2026 ‡ National team caps and goals as of February 14, 2024

Sebastian Francisco Lletget (/ləˈdʒɛt/, Luh-JET; born September 3, 1992) is an American professional soccer player who plays as a midfielder for USL Championship club Monterey Bay FC.

== Early years ==
Born in San Francisco, California, to Argentine parents, Lletget grew up in South San Francisco, California, where he attended El Camino High School and played for Santa Clara Sporting of Silicon Valley before playing with the United States under-17 residency program. He was spotted playing for Santa Clara by scouts from the West Ham United International academy and moved to England in 2009.

== Club career ==
=== West Ham United ===
Lletget signed his first professional contract with West Ham in September 2010. He played in pre-season friendly games and was an unused substitute for four Premier League games for the 2012–13 season. His career progress was slowed when he contracted mononucleosis. Despite this he signed a contract extension in 2013. He made his official debut on January 5, 2014, for West Ham in a 5–0 loss against Nottingham Forest at The City Ground in the third round of the FA Cup.

=== LA Galaxy ===
On May 8, 2015, Lletget signed for LA Galaxy. Lletget debuted for the Galaxy on May 17, 2015, in the 4–0 loss against Orlando City SC when he replaced Mika Väyrynen in the 69th minute. On May 30, Lletget started for USL affiliate club LA Galaxy II against Colorado Springs that ended in a 2–1 victory for the Galaxy. Lletget made his first start with the first team on June 13 against Columbus Crew, in a match where he scored the opening goal of the game, which was also his first for the Galaxy. Lletget scored again 4 days later in a U.S. Open Cup match against PSA Elite that ended in a 6–1 victory. On June 20, Lletget scored for the third match in a row in a 5–1 victory over the Philadelphia Union. Lletget scored for the fourth match in a row in a 5–0 victory over Portland Timbers on June 24.

In the 2016 season, Lletget scored a brace on June 14, 2016, against UPSL side La Máquina FC in extra-time of the Fourth Round of the U.S. Open Cup. Lletget again scored a late brace in the U.S. Open Cup, helping the Galaxy move to the semi-finals after 4–2 victory over Seattle Sounders FC.

After spending the 2017 LA Galaxy season recovering from an injury incurred while playing for the United States national team, Sebastian Lleget opened the scoring for the Galaxy in the 61st minute of the inaugural El Tráfico, adding his first goal since his return. Lletget was then subbed out for the debut of Zlatan Ibrahimović.

=== New England Revolution ===
On December 14, 2021, Lletget was acquired by reigning Supporters' Shield holders New England Revolution. He got his first start and goal in the opening match of the season, a 2–2 draw against Portland Timbers. On March 9, 2022, Lleget scored the game winner in the Revolution's quarter final 2022 CONCACAF Champions League matchup against Pumas UNAM. He scored his second MLS league goal on May 21, 2022, in the Revolution's 3–2 win against FC Cincinnati.

=== FC Dallas ===
On August 3, 2022, FC Dallas acquired Lletget from the Revolution in exchange for $600,000 in allocation money. The deal would reportedly see the Revolution receive $300,000 in allocation money in 2022 and an additional $300,000 in 2023. On November 20, 2025, the team announced that they declined his contract option and that he would become available for MLS free agency.

=== Monterey Bay FC ===
On March 12, 2026, USL Championship side Monterey Bay FC announced the signing of Lletget on a free transfer.

== International career ==
Lletget has played for the United States at under 17, under 20, and under 23 levels.

On January 6, 2017, for the first time, Lletget was called for the United States national team (USMNT) by coach Bruce Arena. On January 29, Lletget played his first game for the United States men's national team against Serbia.

On March 24, 2017, Lletget scored his first goal for the United States men's national team in a World Cup qualifier against Honduras. In the same match, he suffered a Lisfranc injury and was out for six months after undergoing surgery.

On October 1, 2018, Lletget was called up for the first time since sustaining his injury against Honduras for friendlies versus England and Italy.

Lletget appeared in the group stage of the 2019–20 CONCACAF Nations League, starting in the USMNT's 4–1 win over Canada in November 2019. In that tournament's finals, delayed until June 2021 due to the COVID-19 pandemic, Lletget started in the semi-final, a 1–0 win against Honduras. He appeared as a substitute in the USMNT's 3–2 win in the final against Mexico, entering the match in the 83rd minute.

Lletget participated in the 2021 CONCACAF Gold Cup for the United States, captaining the team twice in five appearances. He started the final match, a 1–0 United States win over rival Mexico.

Lletget appeared in four qualifiers for the 2022 FIFA World Cup. He scored a goal in a 4–1 road win at Honduras, a rebound from a Ricardo Pepi shot.

== Personal life ==
In June 2016, it was confirmed that Lletget is in a relationship with singer-songwriter and actress Becky G. In 2020, he appeared in her music video of "My Man". The couple announced their engagement on December 9, 2022. Lletget apologized for cheating allegations in late March 2023.

== Career statistics ==
=== Club ===
As of match played November 14, 2024

Club	Season	League			National cup (Note: Includes FA Cup and U.S. Open Cup)		Playoffs		Continental		Other		Total	
Club	Season	Division	Apps	Goals	Apps	Goals	Apps	Goals	Apps	Goals	Apps	Goals	Apps	Goals
West Ham United	2013–14	Premier League	0	0	1	0	—		—		—		1	0
West Ham United	2014–15	Premier League	0	0	—		—		—		—		0	0
West Ham United	Total		0	0	1	0	—		—		—		1	0
LA Galaxy II	2015	USL Pro	1	0	—		—		—		—		1	0
LA Galaxy	2015	MLS	20	7	3	1	1	1	4 (Note: Appearance(s) in CONCACAF Champions League)	0	—		28	9
LA Galaxy	2016	MLS	31	1	4	4	3	0	—		—		38	5
LA Galaxy	2017	MLS	3	0	—		—		—		—		3	0
LA Galaxy	2018	MLS	28	3	1	0	—		—		—		29	3
LA Galaxy	2019	MLS	29	3	—		2	1	—		1 (Note: Appearance(s) in Leagues Cup)	0	32	4
LA Galaxy	2020	MLS	21 (Note: Includes three appearances in MLS is Back Tournament group stage)	6	—		—		—		—		21	6
LA Galaxy	2021	MLS	26	3	—		—		—		—		26	3
LA Galaxy	Total		158	23	8	5	6	2	4	0	1	0	177	30
New England Revolution	2022	MLS	19	2	1	0	—		2	1	—		22	3
FC Dallas	2022	MLS	10	1	—		2	0	—		—		12	1
FC Dallas	2023	MLS	19	0	1	0	1	0	—		4	2	25	2
FC Dallas	2024	MLS	31	2	2	0	—		—		1	0	34	2
FC Dallas	2025	MLS	20	1	0	0	1	0	—		0	0	20	0
FC Dallas	Total		80	4	3	0	4	0	0	0	5	2	91	5
Career total			238	29	13	5	10	2	6	1	6	2	291	38

=== International ===
As of match played October 10, 2021

National team	Year	Apps	Goals
United States
United States	2017	3	1
United States	2018	2	0
United States	2019	8	1
United States	2020	4	2
United States	2021	16	4
Total		33	8

Source: US Soccer

As of match played September 8, 2021: United States score listed first, score column indicates score after each Lletget goal.

International goals by date, venue, cap, opponent, score, result and competition
No.	Date	Venue	Cap	Opponent	Score	Result	Competition
1	March 24, 2017	Avaya Stadium, San Jose, United States	3	Honduras	1–0	6–0	2018 FIFA World Cup qualification
2	February 2, 2019	Avaya Stadium, San Jose, United States	7	Costa Rica	1–0	2–0	Friendly
3	November 16, 2020	Stadion Wiener Neustadt, Wiener Neustadt, Austria	16	Panama	5–2	6–2	Friendly
4	December 9, 2020	Inter Miami CF Stadium, Fort Lauderdale, United States	17	El Salvador	3–0	6–0	Friendly
5	March 25, 2021	Stadion Wiener Neustadt, Wiener Neustadt, Austria	19	Jamaica	3–1	4–1	Friendly
6	March 25, 2021	Stadion Wiener Neustadt, Wiener Neustadt, Austria	19	Jamaica	4–1	4–1	Friendly
7	May 30, 2021	Kybunpark, St. Gallen, Switzerland	21	Switzerland	1–0	1–2	Friendly
8	September 8, 2021	Estadio Olímpico Metropolitano, San Pedro Sula, Honduras	32	Honduras	4–1	4–1	2022 FIFA World Cup qualification

== Honors ==
United States

- CONCACAF Gold Cup: 2021
- CONCACAF Nations League: 2019–20

Individual

- MLS All-Star: 2021
