= Gideon Baah =

Ghanaian footballer

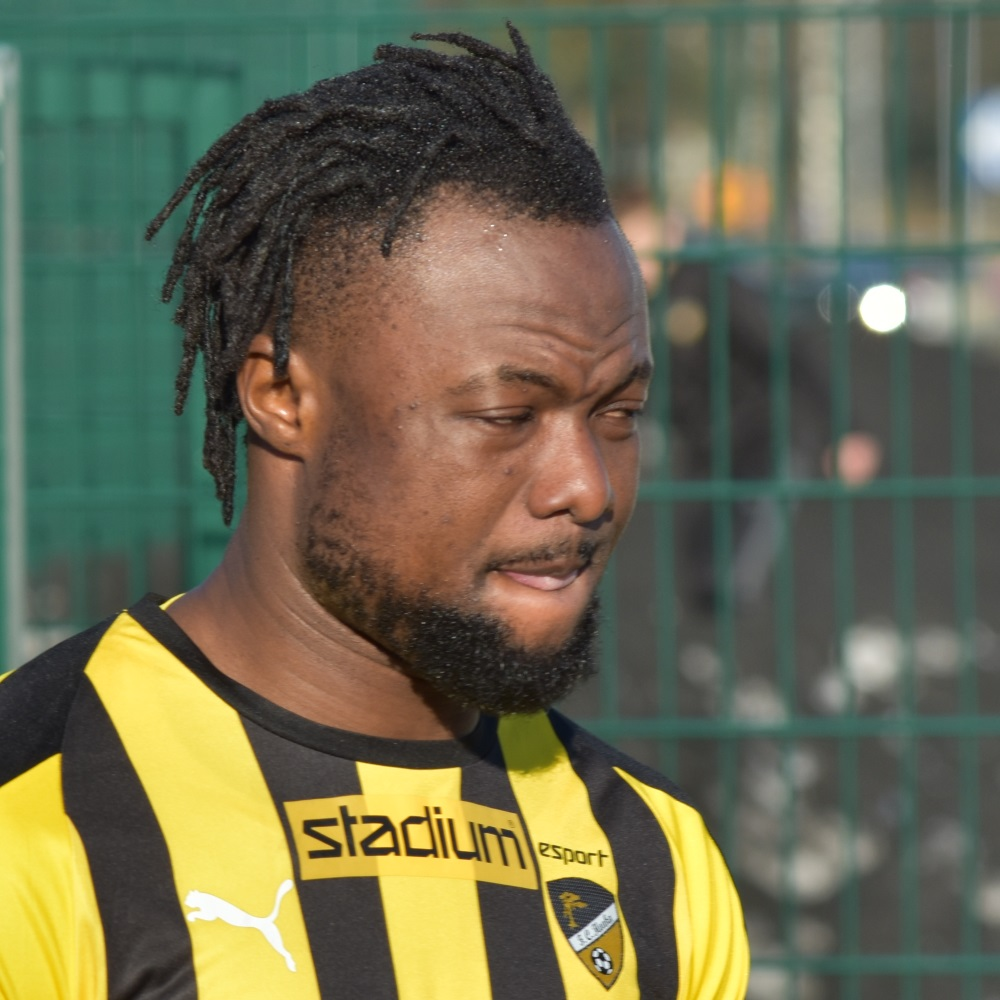
- Gideon Baah with FC Honka in 2019.

Personal information
- Full name: Gideon Baah
- Date of birth: 1 October 1991 (age 35)
- Place of birth: Accra, Ghana
- Height: 1.85 m (6 ft 1 in)
- Position: Defender

Team information
- Current team: FC Motown

Youth career
- 2007: Kakyire
- 2007–2008: Zaytuna
- 2008–2009: Sporting St. Mirren

Senior career*
Years	Team	Apps	(Gls)
2009–2013	Asante Kotoko	30	(2)
2013–2014	Honka	29	(2)
2014–2015	HJK Helsinki	41	(2)
2016–2017	New York Red Bulls	9	(2)
2016–2017	→ New York Red Bulls II	6	(0)
2018	Kairat-A	7	(1)
2018	Gomel	11	(1)
2019	Honka	19	(1)
2020–2021	Shakhter Karagandy	24	(2)
2022	Motown		

International career^{‡}
2015	Ghana	1	(0)

Managerial career
- 2022–: Motown
- * Club domestic league appearances and goals as of 22 March 2022 ‡ National team caps and goals as of 15 October 2015

Gideon Baah (born 1 October 1991) is a Ghanaian football coach and former player who played as a defender. He coaches FC Motown in the National Premier Soccer League.

== Club career ==
=== Early career ===
In 2007, Baah won a football reality show (MTN Soccer Academy) in his home country, Ghana. He received a number of prizes which included cash, car, trip to watch the 2010 FIFA World Cup, and two-week trial at Chelsea FC academy. Chelsea player and Ghanaian international Michael Essien stated that he was very happy with Baah's performance and urged the club to offer him a contract. Baah later returned to Ghana.

=== Asante Kotoko ===
In March 2010, Baah sustained a broken shin in a Premier League match against Hearts of Oak at the Baba Yara Stadium. He underwent surgery at the Komfo Anokye Teaching Hospital (KATH) in Kumasi. In November 2010, he went to Scotland in order to receive assistance with his rehabilitation at Heart of Midlothian. On 28 November 2011, Gideon rejoined Asante Kotoko. On 30 November, he played his first match after returning from his long injury layoff for the Asante Kotoko SC Reserves side. On 21 April 2012, Baah played his first league match against Mighty Jets helping Asante Kotoko to a 2–0 victory and scoring in the process. While with Kotoko, Baah captured two Ghana Premier League titles and one Super Cup.

=== FC Honka ===
Baah started his spell for FC Honka in a form of a loan from Asante Kotoko FC of the Ghanaian Premier League. On Saturday 13 March 2013, Baah made his Veikkausliiga debut in a 2–0 away loss to 'Turun Palloseura. On 22 March he made his home debut at the Tapiolan Urheilupuisto against local rivals HJK Helsinki. Baah scored the winning goal on 25 March 2013 in a 0–1 victory over FC KooTeePee in the Suomen Cup to take his team through to the next round. Baah was chosen to the Veikkausliiga team of the Month for April, May, June and July. On 3 June 2013 Baah was acknowledged for his performance in the first round of the Veikkausliiga by being named by SuomiFutis website as one of the top 5 best players. He scored his first Veikkausliiga goal on 30 June 2013 against FF Jaro where he scored the opening goal in a 4–2 victory. Baah made his Europa League debut on 18 July 2013 in the 2013–14 UEFA Europa League second qualifying round where they lost 1–3 in the first leg to 2012–13 Ekstraklasa runners up Lech Poznań. On 24 July 2013, Baah signed a 2-year contract with FC Honka. At the end of the 2013 Veikkausliiga season, he was officially selected as the leagues defender of the year and rookie of the year.

=== Helsingin Jalkapalloklubi ===
In February 2014 it was announced that Baah had signed a contract to join HJK Helsinki. Upon joining the club he helped HJK qualify for the Europa League group stages in 2014 with a 5-4 aggregate victory over SK Rapid Wien. On 6 November, Baah opened the scoring for HJK in a famous 2–1 victory over Italian side Torino. On the following match day of 27 November Baah once again opened the scoring for HJK in another 2–1 victory over Copenhagen.

=== New York Red Bulls ===
On 9 February 2016, it was announced that Baah had signed for American Major League Soccer side, New York Red Bulls. To replace defender Matt Miazga who had recently been transferred to Chelsea F.C. Baah made his first appearance with the club in 2–0 defeat against Toronto FC on 6 March. Upon recovering from a Week 3 hamstring injury that sidelined him for 6 weeks; Baah was loaned to affiliate club New York Red Bulls II on 1 May. The same day, Baah played 45 minutes for the affiliate side in a 2–0 defeat against Charlotte Independence. He scored his first goal with the club on 21 May 2016 in a 7–0 win over NYCFC. Baah suffered a broken leg in a July match against Portland Timbers, sidelining him for the remainder of 2016.

Baah missed the entire 2017 season due to complications during his injury recovery, playing only a few matches late in the year with Red Bulls II.

=== Kairat-A ===
On 1 February 2018, Baah went on trial with Kazakhstan Premier League side FC Kairat. On 4 April 2018, Kairat announced that Baah had signed for their second team Kairat-A. Baah left Kairat-A on 20 May 2018 by mutual consent having scored once for the club.

=== FC Honka ===
On 3 January 2019 it was announced Baah would return to FC Honka.

=== Shakhter Karagandy ===
On 24 January 2020, Baah signed for Shakhter Karagandy.

On 14 February 2021, Baah signed a new one-year contract with Shakhter Karagandy.

=== FC Motown ===
Baah returned to the United States in 2022, joining FC Motown of the National Premier Soccer League.

== International career ==
In 2009, he received a call-up to Ghana U20 national team.

In October 2015, Baah received his first senior call up to the Ghana national team. He made his debut for Ghana in a 13 October friendly against Canada, coming into the match as a substitute in the 87th minute.

== Career statistics ==
=== Club ===
As of match played 23 April 2021

Appearances and goals by club, season and competition
Club	Season	League			National Cup		League Cup		Continental		Other		Total	
Club	Season	Division	Apps	Goals	Apps	Goals	Apps	Goals	Apps	Goals	Apps	Goals	Apps	Goals
Honka	2013	Veikkausliiga	29	2	2	1	2	0	2	0	—		35	3
HJK	2014	Veikkausliiga	25	2	4	2	2	0	9 (Note: Three appearances in the UEFA Champions League, six appearances and one goal in the UEFA Europa League)	2	—		40	6
HJK	2015	Veikkausliiga	16	0	2	0	6	1	5 (Note: Four appearances and one goal in the UEFA Champions League, one appearance in the UEFA Europa League)	1	—		29	2
HJK	Total		41	2	6	2	8	1	14	3	-	-	69	8
New York Red Bulls	2016	MLS	9	2	1	0	—		0 (Note: Appearances in the CONCACAF Champions League)	0	0 (Note: Appearances in the MLS Cup)	0	10	2
New York Red Bulls	2017	MLS	0	0	0	0	—		0	0	0	0	0	0
New York Red Bulls	Total		9	2	1	0	-	-	0	0	0	0	10	2
Kairat-A	2018	Kazakhstan First Division	7	1	—		—		—		—		7	1
Gomel	2018	Belarusian Premier League	11	1	2	1	—		—		—		13	2
Honka	2019	Veikkausliiga	19	1	4	2	—		—		—		23	3
Shakhter Karagandy	2020	Kazakhstan Premier League	19	2	0	0	—		—		—		19	2
Shakhter Karagandy	2021	Kazakhstan Premier League	5	0	0	0	—		0 (Note: Appearances and goal in the UEFA Europa Conference League)	0	1 (Note: Appearances in the Kazakhstan Super Cup)	0	6	0
Shakhter Karagandy	Total		24	2	0	0	-	-	0	0	1	0	25	2
Career total			140	11	15	6	10	1	14	3	1	0	180	21

=== International ===
As of match played 13 October 2015

National Team	Year	Apps	Goals
Ghana
Ghana	2015	1	0
Total		1	0

== Honours ==
Asante Kotoko

- Ghana Premier League: 2011–12, 2012–13
- Ghana Super Cup: 2012

HJK Helsinki

- Finnish Championship: 2014
- Finnish Cup: 2014
- Finnish League Cup: 2015

New York Red Bulls II

- USL Championship: 2016

Individual

- Veikkausliiga Rookie of the Year: 2013
- Veikkausliiga Defender of the Year: 2013
