= Farsund IL =

Norwegian sports club

- Full name: Farsund Idrettslag
- Founded: 1916
- Ground: Alcoaparken
Home colours

Farsund Idrettslag is a sports club from Farsund Municipality, Norway. Farsund Idrettslag takes part in football, handball, volleyball and archery.

Farsund's men's football team is playing in the Fifth Division. The team played in the Third Division between 2008 and 2010.

People that have been in the club includes Martin Spinnangr, Terje Reinertsen, Esben Ertzeid and Christian Tveit.
