= 2015 LA Galaxy season =

American soccer club season

LA Galaxy
2015 season
- Owner: Philip Anschutz (AEG)
- Coach: Bruce Arena
- MLS: Conference: 5th Overall: 9th
- U.S. Open Cup: Quarterfinals
- CONCACAF Champions League: Group stage
- MLS Cup playoffs: Knockout round
- Top goalscorer: League: Robbie Keane (20 goals); All: Robbie Keane (25 goals)
- Highest home attendance: League: 27,000 (Nine times); All: 93,226 (July 21 vs. Barcelona, at the Rose Bowl)
- Lowest home attendance: League: 13,391 (May 27 vs. Salt Lake); All: 4,055 (June 17 vs. PSA Elite)
- Average home league attendance: League: 23,392; All: 25,094
Home colors	Away colors	Third colors

The 2015 LA Galaxy season was the club's twentieth season of existence, and their twentieth consecutive season in Major League Soccer, the top tier of American soccer.

The Galaxy entered the season as the defending MLS Cup champions. They finished fifth in the Western Conference during the 2015 MLS regular season and were eliminated by Seattle Sounders FC in the Knockout Round of the playoffs. The team qualified for the 2015–16 CONCACAF Champions League by virtue of winning MLS Cup 2014. The Galaxy reached the quarterfinals of the U.S. Open Cup before being eliminated by Real Salt Lake.

== Players ==
=== Squad information ===
Note: Flags indicate national team as defined under FIFA eligibility rules; some limited exceptions apply. Players may hold more than one non-FIFA nationality.

No.	Pos.	Nation	Player
1	GK	JAM	Donovan Ricketts
2	DF	USA	Todd Dunivant
3	MF	FIN	Mika Väyrynen
4	DF	USA	Omar Gonzalez
5	MF	USA	Jose Villarreal (HGP)
6	MF	BIH	Baggio Husidić
7	FW	IRL	Robbie Keane (DP & Captain)
8	MF	ENG	Steven Gerrard (DP)
9	FW	USA	Alan Gordon
10	FW	MEX	Giovani dos Santos (DP)
11	FW	USA	Gyasi Zardes (HGP)
12	GK	USA	Brian Rowe
14	DF	USA	Robbie Rogers
15	FW	ESP	Ignacio Maganto
16	FW	USA	Edson Buddle
17	MF	USA	Sebastian Lletget
19	MF	BRA	Juninho
20	DF	GUM	A. J. DeLaGarza
21	DF	USA	Tommy Meyer
22	DF	BRA	Leonardo
24	GK	USA	Brian Perk
25	MF	USA	Rafael Garcia
27	DF	USA	Dave Romney
31	GK	USA	Andrew Wolverton
32	FW	USA	Jack McBean (HGP)
33	DF	USA	Dan Gargan
34	MF	USA	Kenney Walker
36	DF	USA	Oscar Sorto (HGP)
38	FW	USA	Bradford Jamieson IV (HGP)
40	FW	MEX	Raúl Mendiola (HGP)

=== Transfers ===
==== Transfers in ====
Pos.	Player	Transferred from	Fee/notes	Date	Source
MF	(England) Steven Gerrard	(England) Liverpool	Joined the team in July	January 7, 2015	
FW	(Spain) Ignacio Maganto	(United States) Iona Gaels (United States) Reading United	Selected in the 2015 MLS SuperDraft with the 21st pick	January 15, 2015	
DF	(United States) Daniel Keller	(United States) Louisville Cardinals (United States) Chicago Fire U-23	Selected in the 2015 MLS SuperDraft with the 62nd pick	January 20, 2015	
GK	(United States) Andrew Wolverton	(United States) Penn State Nittany Lions (United States) IMG Academy Bradenton	Selected in the 2015 MLS SuperDraft with the 82nd pick	January 20, 2015	
GK	(United States) Brian Perk	None	Re-sign	January 22, 2015	
MF	(United States) Rafael Garcia	None	Re-sign	January 26, 2015	
MF	(Finland) Mika Väyrynen	(Finland) HJK Helsinki	Sign	March 6, 2015	
FW	(United States) Edson Buddle	(United States) Colorado Rapids	Sign	March 6, 2015	
GK	(United States) Trey Mitchell	(United States) Cal State Dominguez Hills Toros	Sign	March 27, 2015	
MF	(United States) Sebastian Lletget	(England) West Ham United	Sign	May 8, 2015	
FW	(Mexico) Giovani dos Santos	(Spain) Villarreal	Sign	July 15, 2015	
GK	(Jamaica) Donovan Ricketts	(United States) Orlando City SC	Acquired in exchange for a second-round selection in the 2016 MLS SuperDraft.	July 30, 2015	
DF	(United States) Dave Romney	(United States) LA Galaxy II	Sign	August 5, 2015	

==== Transfers out ====
Pos.	Player	Transferred to	Fee/notes	Date	Source
FW	(United States) Landon Donovan	None	Retired	December 2, 2014	
MF	(United States) Rafael Garcia		Option declined	December 11, 2014	
DF	(United States) James Riley	Later signed with (United States) Colorado Rapids.	Option declined	December 11, 2014	
GK	(United States) Brian Perk		Option declined	December 11, 2014	
FW	(United States) Chandler Hoffman	Later selected by the (United States) Houston Dynamo in 2014 MLS Re-Entry Draft second stage.	Option declined	December 11, 2014	
DF	(United States) Kyle Venter	Later signed with (United States) Tulsa Roughnecks FC.	Waived	December 11, 2014	
MF	(Brazil) Marcelo Sarvas	(United States) Colorado Rapids	Allocation money	January 15, 2015	
FW	(United States) Charlie Rugg	(United States) Indy Eleven	Loan	March 18, 2015	
MF	(Sweden) Stefan Ishizaki	Later signed with (Sweden) AIK.	Released	July 4, 2015	
GK	(Panama) Jaime Penedo		Contract mutually terminated	July 29, 2015	

== Competitions ==
=== Friendlies ===
Win Draw Loss Postponed

January 28	LA Galaxy	2–0	Ventura County Fusion	Carson, California
	Keane; Buddle	Report		Stadium: StubHub Center Track & Field Stadium

January 31	LA Galaxy	6–1	Cal State Fullerton Titans	Carson, California
	Auras, Keane; Rugg; Garcia; Mendiola	Report	Goal	Stadium: StubHub Center Track & Field Stadium

February 3	Georgetown Hoyas	1–2	LA Galaxy	Washington, D.C.
	Campbell	Report	Villarreal (o.g.)	Stadium: Shaw Field

February 6	LA Galaxy	2–1	Seattle Sounders FC	Carson, California
11:30	Husidic 18'; Maganto 54'	Report	Pappa 26'	Stadium: StubHub Center; Attendance: Closed door

February 16	Hammarby	2–1	LA Galaxy	Stockholm, Sweden
10:00 PST	Israelsson 11'; Hallenius 47'	Report	Keane 7' (pen.); Juninho (red card) 55'	Stadium: Tele2 Arena

February 21	Shamrock Rovers	0–1	LA Galaxy	Dublin, Republic of Ireland
8:00 PST		Report	Väyrynen 44'	Stadium: Tallaght Stadium

February 28	San Jose Earthquakes	3–2	LA Galaxy	San Jose, California
14:00 PST	Gonzalez 42' (o.g.); Alashe (yellow card) 53'; Koval 58'; Jahn 68'	Report	Villareal 66'; Keane 82'	Stadium: Avaya Stadium

=== Major League Soccer ===
==== Standings ====
===== Western Conference =====
Pos	Team	Pld	W	L	T	GF	GA	GD	Pts	Qualification
3	Portland Timbers	34	15	11	8	41	39	+2	53	MLS Cup Knockout Round
4	Seattle Sounders FC	34	15	13	6	44	36	+8	51	MLS Cup Knockout Round
5	LA Galaxy	34	14	11	9	56	46	+10	51	MLS Cup Knockout Round
6	Sporting Kansas City	34	14	11	9	48	45	+3	51	MLS Cup Knockout Round
7	San Jose Earthquakes	34	13	13	8	41	39	+2	47	

Source: MLS

===== Overall =====
Pos	Team	Pld	W	L	T	GF	GA	GD	Pts	Qualification
7	Montreal Impact	34	15	13	6	48	44	+4	51	
8	D.C. United	34	15	13	6	43	45	−2	51	
9	LA Galaxy	34	14	11	9	56	46	+10	51	
10	Sporting Kansas City	34	14	11	9	48	45	+3	51	CONCACAF Champions League
11	New England Revolution	34	14	12	8	48	47	+1	50	

Source: MLS
Rules for classification: 1) points; 2) total wins; 3) total goal differential; 4) total goals scored

==== Regular season ====
Win Draw Loss Postponed

March 6 1	LA Galaxy	2–0	Chicago Fire	Carson, California
19:00 PST	Walker (yellow card) 61'; Villareal 65'; Keane 81'	Report	Maloney (yellow card) 22'; Guly (yellow card) 75'	Stadium: StubHub Center; Attendance: 27,000; Referee: Jair Marrufo

March 15 2	Portland Timbers	2–2	LA Galaxy	Portland, Oregon
16:00 PDT	Adi 31', 90'	Report	Zardes 65'; Väyrynen (yellow card) 79'; Gargan (yellow card) 88'; Gordon 90+2'	Stadium: Providence Park; Attendance: 21,144; Referee: Hilario Grajeda

March 21 3	LA Galaxy	1–1	Houston Dynamo	Carson, California
19:30 PDT	Keane 3'; Husidić (yellow card) 39'; Juinho (yellow card) 58'	Report	Barnes (yellow card) 5'; Sturgis 11'; Garrido (yellow card) 39'; Sarkodie (yellow card) 77'	Stadium: StubHub Center; Attendance: 19,087; Referee: Juan Guzman

March 28 4	D.C. United	1–0	LA Galaxy	Washington, D.C.
16:00 PDT	Arnaud (yellow card) 46'; Boswell (yellow card) 89'; Pontius 90+3'	Report		Stadium: RFK Stadium; Attendance: 14,462; Referee: Ismail Elfath

April 4 5	Vancouver Whitecaps FC	2–0	LA Galaxy	Vancouver
19:00 PDT	Kah (yellow card) 41'; Manneh 56'; Adekugbe (yellow card) 59'; Rivero 66'	Report	Zardes (yellow card) 85'	Stadium: BC Place; Attendance: 21,000; Referee: Baldomero Toledo

April 12 6	LA Galaxy	1–0	Seattle Sounders FC	Carson, California
16:00 PDT	Gordon 23', (yellow card) 90+3'; Gargan (yellow card) 27'; Husidić (yellow card) 81'; Juninho (yellow card) 88'	Report	Martins (yellow card) 34'; Marshall (yellow card) 45+2'	Stadium: StubHub Center; Attendance: 27,000; Referee: Mark Geiger

April 18 7	LA Galaxy	2–1	Sporting Kansas City	Carson, California
19:30 PDT	Husidić 9'; Gargan (yellow card) 32'; Juninho (yellow card) 83'; Gonzalez 90+4'	Report	Németh 22'; Espinoza (yellow card) 30'; Dwyer (yellow card) 83'	Stadium: StubHub Center; Attendance: 20,018; Referee: Alan Kelly

April 26 8	New York Red Bulls	1–1	LA Galaxy	Harrison, New Jersey
14:00 PDT	Miazga (yellow card) 29'; Felipe 58'; McCarty (yellow card) 66'	Report	Jamieson IV 9'; Zardes (yellow card) 14'; Gordon (yellow card) 44'; Rogers (yellow card) 81'; Gonzalez (yellow card) 82'	Stadium: Red Bull Arena; Attendance: 20,062; Referee: Ted Unkel

May 2 9	LA Galaxy	1–1	Colorado Rapids	Carson, California
19:30 PDT	Gargan (yellow card) 13'; Gordon 75'; Rogers (yellow card) 82'	Report	LaBrocca (yellow card) 25'; Torres 40'; Cronin (yellow card) 49'; Riley (yellow card) 88'	Stadium: StubHub Center; Attendance: 16,676; Referee: Fotis Bazakos

May 6 10	Real Salt Lake	0–0	LA Galaxy	Sandy, Utah
19:40 PDT	Olave (yellow card) 89'	Report	Gonzalez (yellow card) 42'	Stadium: Rio Tinto Stadium; Attendance: 19,296; Referee: Jose Carlos Rivero
Note: Match originally to be played at 18:30 PDT but was delayed due severe weather in Sandy.

May 9 11	FC Dallas	2–1	LA Galaxy	Frisco, Texas
17:30 PDT	Hernandez (yellow card) 33'; Pérez 77'; Akindele 86'	Report	Gargan (yellow card) 41'; Zardes 59'; Ishizaki (yellow card) 65'	Stadium: Toyota Stadium; Attendance: 13,829; Referee: Kevin Stott

May 17 12	Orlando City SC	4–0	LA Galaxy	Orlando, Florida
14:00 PDT	Avila 12'; Larin 34'; Kaká 56' (pen.), (yellow card) 56'; Cerén 73'	Report	Penedo (yellow card) 59'; Väyrynen (yellow card) 65'	Stadium: Citrus Bowl; Attendance: 40,122; Referee: Jair Marrufo

May 22 13	LA Galaxy	1–0	Houston Dynamo	Carson, California
19:30 PDT	Ishizaki (yellow card) 24'; Juninho (yellow card) 58'; Gordon 90+2', (yellow card) 90+3'; Sorto (red card) 90+6'	Report	Rodríguez (yellow card) 43'; Barnes (yellow card) 82'	Stadium: StubHub Center; Attendance: 20,195; Referee: Ismail Elfath

May 27 14	LA Galaxy	1–0	Real Salt Lake	Carson, California
19:30	Juninho 7' (pen.); Gordon (yellow card) 40'; Husidić (yellow card) 45'; Väyrynen (yellow card) 63'	Report	Beckerman (yellow card) 10'; Olave (red card) 90+1'	Stadium: StubHub Center; Attendance: 13,391; Referee: Baldomero Toledo

May 31 15	New England Revolution	2–2	LA Galaxy	Foxborough, Massachusetts
16:00 PDT	Bunbury 5'; Alston (yellow card) 24'; Fagúndez 37'; Dorman (yellow card) 61'	Report	Maganto 18'; Zardes 27'	Stadium: Gillette Stadium; Attendance: 17,569; Referee: Alan Kelly

June 6 16	LA Galaxy	0–1	Vancouver Whitecaps FC	Carson, California
19:30 PDT	Leonardo (yellow card) 34'	Report	Beitashour (yellow card) 20'; Manneh 32'	Stadium: StubHub Center; Attendance: 20,219; Referee: Ricardo Salazar

June 13 17	Columbus Crew	1–1	LA Galaxy	Columbus, Ohio
16:30 PDT	Higuaín 66'	Report	Lletget 14'; Gonzalez (yellow card) 71'; Rogers (yellow card) 87'	Stadium: Mapfre Stadium; Attendance: 21,051; Referee: Robert Sibiga

June 20 18	LA Galaxy	5–1	Philadelphia Union	Carson, California
19:30 PDT	DeLaGarza (yellow card) 6'; Husidić 23'; Juninho 35'; Zardes 56'; Ishizaki 59'; Lletget 65'	Report	Sapong 58'; Fred (yellow card) 88'	Stadium: StubHub Center; Attendance: 23,875; Referee: Kevin Stott

June 24 19	LA Galaxy	5–0	Portland Timbers	Carson, California
20:00 PDT	Lletget 13'; Keane 18' (pen.); Rogers 33', (yellow card) 65'; Juninho 72'; Gordon (yellow card) 78'; Villareal 88'	Report	Ridgewell (red card) 78'	Stadium: StubHub Center; Attendance: 21,207; Referee: Ted Unkel

June 27 20	San Jose Earthquakes	3–1	LA Galaxy	Stanford, California
19:30 PDT	Nyassi (yellow card) 13'; Bernárdez (yellow card) 23'; Wondolowski 28'; Goodson 53'; Cato 72'	Report	Juninho 17'; Ishizaki (yellow card) 19'; Gordon (yellow card) 88'	Stadium: Stanford Stadium; Attendance: 50,422; Referee: Jose Carlos Rivero

July 4 21	LA Galaxy	4–0	Toronto FC	Carson, California
19:30 PDT	Keane 9', 41', 59' (pen.); Villareal (yellow card) 54'; Husidić (yellow card) 58'; DeLaGarza (yellow card) 80'; Lletget 90+4'	Report	Zavaleta (yellow card) 60'; Delgado (yellow card) 68'; Warner (yellow card) 85'	Stadium: StubHub Center; Attendance: 27,000; Referee: Chris Penso

July 17 22	LA Galaxy	5–2	San Jose Earthquakes	Carson, California
20:00 PDT	Keane 30' (pen.), 64', 80' (pen.); Rogers (yellow card) 36'; Gerrard 37'; Lletget 90+2'	Report	Amarikwa 22', 25'; Thompson (yellow card) 30'; Salinas (yellow card) 55'; Bingham (yellow card) 69'; Stewart (yellow card) 70'	Stadium: StubHub Center; Attendance: 27,000; Referee: Alan Kelly

July 25 23	Houston Dynamo	3–0	LA Galaxy	Houston, Texas
18:00 PDT	Bruin 9'; Davis 27'; Miranda 88'	Report	Jamieson IV (yellow card) 16'	Stadium: BBVA Compass Stadium; Attendance: 22,445; Referee: Silviu Petrescu

August 1 24	Colorado Rapids	1–3	LA Galaxy	Commerce City, Colorado
18:00 PDT	Sarvas 12'; Burling (yellow card) 42'; Cronin (yellow card) 43'	Report	Lletget 56'; Gordon 69'; Buddle (yellow card) 80'; Garcia (yellow card) 88'; Keane (yellow card) 90+1', (goal) 90+3'	Stadium: Dick's Sporting Goods Park; Attendance: 18,597; Referee: Juan Guzman

August 9 25	LA Galaxy	3–1	Seattle Sounders FC	Carson, California
13:00 PDT	Zardes 13'; Keane 47'; Giovani 64'	Report	Barrett 1'; Friberg (yellow card) 38'; Fisher (yellow card) 62'	Stadium: StubHub Center; Attendance: 27,000; Referee: Jair Marrufo

August 15 26	FC Dallas	1–2	LA Galaxy	Frisco, Texas
18:00 PDT	Barrios 33'; Acosta (yellow card) 38'; Pérez (yellow card) 61'	Report	Keane 51', 56'; DeLaGarza (yellow card) 57'; Ricketts (yellow card) 77'; Zardes (yellow card) 90+1'	Stadium: Toyota Stadium; Attendance: 21,907; Referee: Ricardo Salazar

August 23 27	LA Galaxy	5–1	New York City FC	Carson, California
12:00 PDT	Zardes 36'; Keane 54', 81'; Giovani 67'; Lletget 70'	Report	Villa 80' (pen.); Grabavoy (yellow card) 83'	Stadium: StubHub Center; Attendance: 27,000; Referee: Baldomero Toledo

August 28 28	San Jose Earthquakes	1–0	LA Galaxy	San Jose, California
20:00 PDT	Salinas 18'; Bernárdez (yellow card) 90'	Report	Leonardo (red card) 47'; Rogers (yellow card) 74'	Stadium: Avaya Stadium; Attendance: 18,000; Referee: Jose Carlos Rivero

September 12 29	LA Galaxy	0–0	Montreal Impact	Carson, California
19:30 PDT		Report	Reo-Coker (yellow card) 37'; Romero (yellow card) 52'	Stadium: StubHub Center; Attendance: 27,000; Referee: Mark Geiger

September 19 30	Real Salt Lake	3–0	LA Galaxy	Sandy, Utah
18:30 PDT	Sandoval 3', 53'; Morales (yellow card) 15', (goal) 28' (pen.)	Report		Stadium: Rio Tinto Stadium; Attendance: 21,004; Referee: Kevin Stott

September 27 31	LA Galaxy	3–2	FC Dallas	Carson, California
18:30 PDT	Giovani 11'; Keane 14'; Gerrard 57'; Juninho (yellow card) 69'; Gordon (yellow card) 90+4'	Report	Barrios 35'; Harris 86'	Stadium: StubHub Center; Attendance: 27,000; Referee: Baldomero Toledo

October 4 32	Seattle Sounders FC	1–1	LA Galaxy	Seattle
18:30 PDT	Keane 36'	Report	Barrett 90+3'	Stadium: CenturyLink Field; Attendance: 56,097; Referee: Jair Marrufo

October 18 33	LA Galaxy	2–5	Portland Timbers	Carson, California
16:00 PDT	Keane 36', 84'; Gargan (yellow card) 67'; Leonardo (yellow card) 77'	Report	Adi 65', 68' (pen.); Chará 74'; Villafaña (yellow card) 81'; Nagbe 85'; Urruti 90'	Stadium: StubHub Center; Attendance: 27,000; Referee: Alan Kelly

October 25 34	Sporting Kansas City	2–1	LA Galaxy	Kansas City, Kansas
16:00 PDT	Dwyer (yellow card) 17', (goal) 65'; Ellis 38'; Myers (yellow card) 58'; Nagamura (yellow card) 66'; Feilhaber (yellow card) 90+2'	Report	DeLaGarza (yellow card) 24'; Keane 45+1'	Stadium: Sporting Park; Attendance: 19,422; Referee: Mark Geiger

==== MLS Cup Playoffs ====
===== Knockout round =====
October 28	Seattle Sounders FC	3–2	LA Galaxy	Seattle
19:00	Dempsey 5'; Valdez 12'; Friberg 73'; Frei (yellow card) 90+3'	Report	Lletget 6'; Zardes 22'; Gonzalez (yellow card) 44'; Husidić (yellow card) 77'	Stadium: CenturyLink Field; Attendance: 39,537; Referee: Jair Marrufo

=== U.S. Open Cup ===
Win Draw Loss Postponed

==== Fourth round ====
June 17	LA Galaxy (California)	6–1	(California) PSA Elite	Carson, California
19:30 PT	Lletget 15'; Zardes 19'; Keane 29', 53', 70'; Husidić 77'	Report	Salazar 12'; Haberkorn (yellow card) 39'; Wallace (yellow card) 72'	Stadium: StubHub Center; Attendance: 4,055; Referee: Alejandro Mariscal

==== Fifth round ====
The draw for this round was held on June 18.

July 1	San Jose Earthquakes (California)	0–1	(California) LA Galaxy	San Jose, California
19:30 PT	Pierazzi (yellow card) 84'; Fucito (yellow card) 87'	Report	Villarreal 5'; Mendiola (yellow card) 84'; Rowe (yellow card) 90'	Stadium: Avaya Stadium; Attendance: 13,329; Referee: Allen Chapman

==== Quarterfinal ====
July 14	Real Salt Lake (Utah)	1–0	(California) LA Galaxy	Sandy, Utah
19:00 PT	Maund 87'; Mulholland (yellow card) 89'	Report		Stadium: Rio Tinto Stadium; Attendance: 11,060; Referee: Jose Carlos Rivero

=== CONCACAF Champions League ===
Win Draw Loss Postponed

==== Group stage ====
The LA Galaxy have been drawn into Group D. The full tournament schedule was announced on June 29, 2015.

===== Standings =====
Pos	Team	Pld	W	D	L	GF	GA	GD	Pts	Qualification	LAX	CEN	COM
1	(United States) LA Galaxy	4	2	2	0	12	3	+9	8	Knockout stage	—	5–1	5–0
2	(Trinidad and Tobago) Central	4	1	1	2	3	7	−4	4		1–1	—	1–0
3	(Guatemala) Comunicaciones	4	1	1	2	2	7	−5	4		1–1	1–0	—

Source: CONCACAF

==== Matches ====
All times U.S. Eastern Daylight Time (UTC−4)

August 6 1	LA Galaxy (United States)	5–1	(Trinidad and Tobago) Central	Carson
22:00	Gordon 3'; Mendiola 31'; Zardes 54' (pen.); Giovani 75'; Maganto 83'	Report	Guerra 5' (pen.); Williams (yellow card) 38'	Stadium: StubHub Center; Attendance: 13,625; Referee: Christopher Reid (Belize)

August 18 2	LA Galaxy (United States)	5–0	(Guatemala) Comunicaciones	Carson
22:00	Väyrynen 5'; Gordon 9', 54'; Keane 87', 89'	Report	Del Águila (yellow card) 30'	Stadium: StubHub Center; Referee: José Peñaloza (Mexico)

September 23 3	Central (Trinidad and Tobago)	1–1	(United States) LA Galaxy	Port of Spain, Trinidad and Tobago
20:00	Plaza 2'; Dillion (yellow card) 49'; Oliver (yellow card) 52'	Report	Walker (yellow card) 63'; Gordon 82'	Stadium: Hasely Crawford Stadium; Referee: William Anderson (Puerto Rico)

October 21 4	Comunicaciones (Guatemala)	1–1	(United States) LA Galaxy	Guatemala City, Guatemala
22:00	Lalín (yellow card) 66'; Blackburn 90+3'	Report	Meyer (yellow card) 80'; Gordon 84'	Stadium: Estadio Cementos Progreso; Referee: Fernando Guerrero (Mexico)

=== International Champions Cup ===
Matches announced on April 28.

July 11 1	LA Galaxy (United States)	2–1	(Mexico) América	Carson, California
20:30 PT	Keane 45'; Maganto (yellow card) 54'; Gordon 80'	Report; Report	Quintero 7'; Rivera (yellow card) 45+2'; Mares (yellow card) 57'; Goltz (yellow card) 59'	Stadium: StubHub Center; Attendance: 27,934; Referee: Armando Villarreal (United States)

July 21 2	LA Galaxy (United States)	1–2	(Spain) Barcelona	Pasadena, California
20:00 PT	Leonardo (yellow card) 41'; Meyer 90+1'	Report	Suárez 45'; Roberto 56'	Stadium: Rose Bowl; Attendance: 93,226; Referee: Ismail Elfath (United States)

== See also ==
- 2015 in American soccer
- 2015 LA Galaxy II season
