= Mika Väyrynen =

Finnish footballer (born 1981)

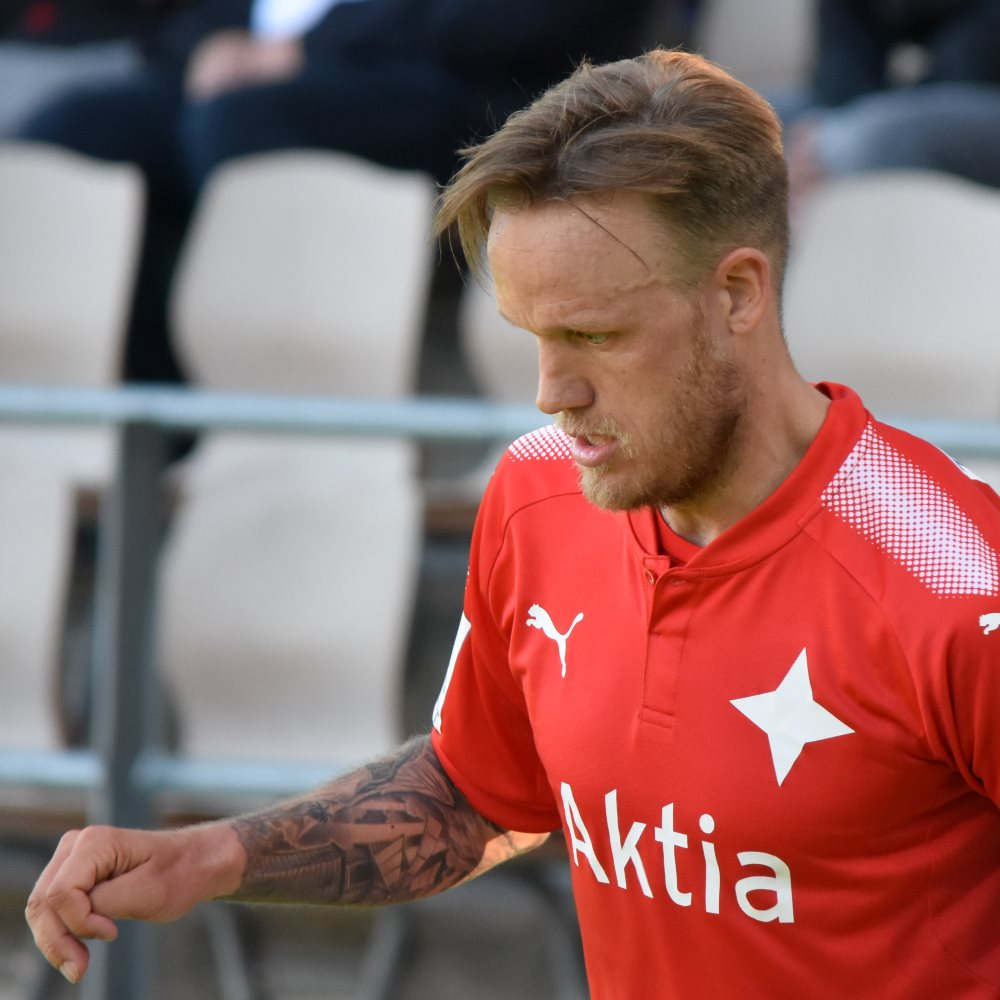
- Väyrynen in 2017

Personal information
- Date of birth: 28 December 1981 (age 44)
- Place of birth: Eskilstuna, Sweden
- Height: 1.81 m (5 ft 11 in)
- Position: Central midfielder

Senior career*
Years	Team	Apps	(Gls)
1999–2000	FC Lahti	36	(11)
2001	Jokerit	30	(4)
2001–2005	Heerenveen	101	(17)
2005–2008	PSV	29	(2)
2008–2011	Heerenveen	57	(11)
2011–2012	Leeds United	10	(0)
2012–2014	HJK	40	(5)
2015	LA Galaxy	19	(0)
2016–2017	HIFK	40	(0)
Total		362	(50)

International career^{‡}
2002–2015	Finland	64	(5)

Managerial career
- 2018–2019: Klubi 04 (assistant)
- 2019–2020: HJK (assistant)
- 2021: Klubi 04
- 2024: Honka
Medal record
PSV
Winner	Eredivisie	2006
Runner-up	KNVB Cup	2006
Runner-up	Johan Cruyff Shield	2006
Winner	Eredivisie	2007
Runner-up	Johan Cruyff Shield	2007
Winner	Eredivisie	2008
Runner-up	Johan Cruyff Shield	2008
Heerenveen
Winner	KNVB Cup	2009
Runner-up	Johan Cruyff Shield	2009
- * Club domestic league appearances and goals as of 5 August 2016 ‡ National team caps and goals as of 13:34, 2 May 2013 (UTC)

Mika Väyrynen (born 28 December 1981) is a Finnish former professional footballer who played as a central midfielder, and a football coach, most recently serving as the head coach of Honka in Kakkonen. After his playing career, Väyrynen has also worked as an assistant coach of Klubi 04 and HJK, and as a head coach of Klubi 04.

== Early life ==
Väyrynen was born in Eskilstuna, Sweden, where his Finnish father worked. He grew up in Karis, Finland.

== Club career ==
=== Early career ===
Väyrynen started his career with FC Lahti and joined FC Jokerit for the 2001 season.

=== Heerenveen ===
Midway through that year Heerenveen beat Inter Milan to his signature, Väyrynen opting for the Dutch club in order to have a better chance of a regular starting place. The transfer fee was not disclosed but is rumoured to be in seven figures. He immediately broke into the Heerenveen side, though the switch from a summer to winter season meant he began to suffer from injury problems. However, in 2003–04 he became their key player in midfield, and ended up scoring 17 goals in 100 Eredivisie games.

=== PSV ===
In the summer of 2005, Väyrynen joined PSV, upon joining stating, "PSV is the best option for me. At Heerenveen I learned to play more simple football. I am not the player I was in Finland any more, tactically and physically especially I have grown a lot." He was brought in to replace Mark van Bommel by PSV manager Guus Hiddink. Väyrynen was, however, ruled out for much of the early 2005–06 season with an ankle injury. Väyrynen returned to action as a substitute on 17 December 2005 against Willem II, and immediately scored his first goal for PSV. He was not able to earn a regular starting place in the spring season, and mostly made substitute appearances, as PSV secured the Dutch title for the second year in a row.

Väyrynen was linked with a move to Rangers and newly promoted Premier League side Derby County as they looked to strengthen for the 2007–08 season. Väyrynen almost moved to Derby in August 2007, but the move collapsed because of a calf injury.

In the summer of 2008, Väyrynen was again linked with Rangers and an undisclosed Belgian team, believed to be Club Brugge. He was also linked with Derby for the second time on 22 July 2008, according to Derby's local radio, despite their relegation to the Championship.

=== Heerenveen ===
On 31 August 2008, two days before the closing of the transfer window, Väyrynen was signed by former club Heerenveen to a contract until 2011 with an option of one year more. He picked up a knee injury in a January 2009 match against Ajax which ruled him out of play until the end of 2009. In his final season at Heerenveen, he scored 9 league goals for the club in 30 games.

=== Leeds United ===
On 13 September 2011, Väyrynen, now a free agent, signed a one-year deal – with an option of a further year – with English Championship side Leeds United. Väyrynen was rumoured to have been on the verge of signing Austrian club Red Bull Salzburg at the time Leeds came in for him.

In signing for Leeds, Väyrynen joined compatriot Mikael Forssell at Elland Road. Väyrynen made his first appearance in a Leeds squad on 20 September, he was named on the bench against rivals Manchester United, and was brought on with Forssell in the 52nd minute. Väyrynen made his league debut as a substitute in the 3–3 draw against Brighton & Hove Albion on 23 September, coming on for the last nine minutes. He made his Elland Road league debut against Portsmouth on 1 October, coming on as a second-half substitute in a 1–0 win. He made his first start for Leeds on 22 October, coming into the side for the injured Robert Snodgrass against Peterborough United.

Väyrynen was ruled out for a few weeks when he had groin surgery which also ruled him out of some of the international fixtures with Finland. He returned as a substitute for Leeds against Watford on 10 December, and he made an immediate impact when he won an injury time penalty for Leeds to equalise. His second start came in Leeds 4–1 loss against Barnsley on 31 December 2011.

On 16 April, Leeds united terminated Väyrynen's contract by mutual consent after eight months at the club.

=== HJK Helsinki ===
Since leaving Leeds, Väyrynen had been training with HJK Helsinki in order to maintain match fitness. On 10 July, HJK announced that Väyrynen had signed a three-month contract with the club. He made his debut one week later, scoring from a penalty, in a 7−0 home win against KR Reykjavik in UEFA Champions League qualifiers. He made in total of 12 league appearances, scoring three goals, as HJK were crowned as league champions for the fourth consecutive season.

On 1 February 2013, Väyrynen signed a two-year contract extension with HJK.

=== LA Galaxy ===
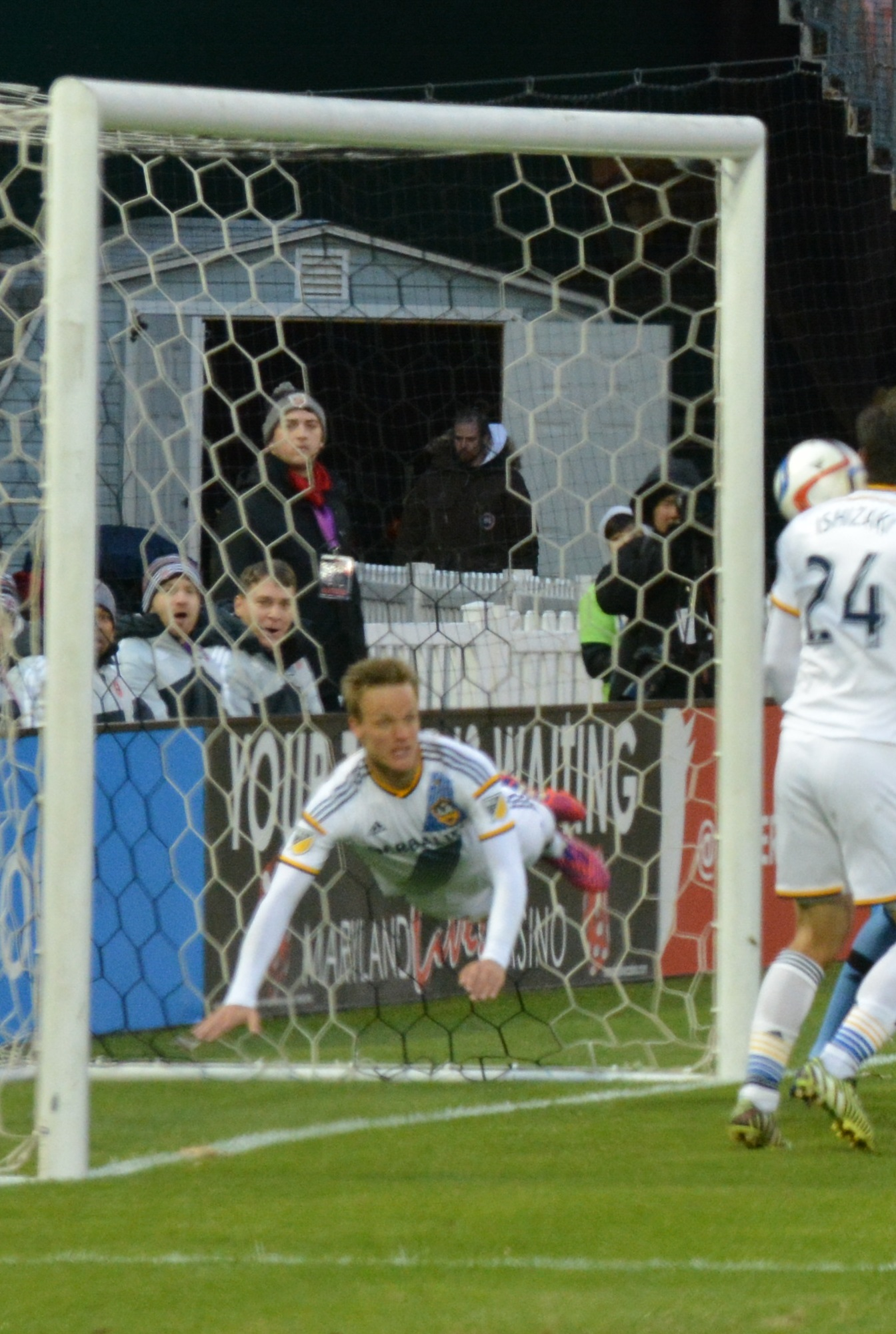
Väyrynen with LA Galaxy in 2015

In February 2015, Väyrynen trialed with LA Galaxy of Major League Soccer and signed with them on 6 March 2015. On 15 March 2015, he made his debut against the Portland Timbers, coming off the bench in the 62nd minute and replacing Baggio Hušidić in an eventual 2–2 draw.

== International career ==
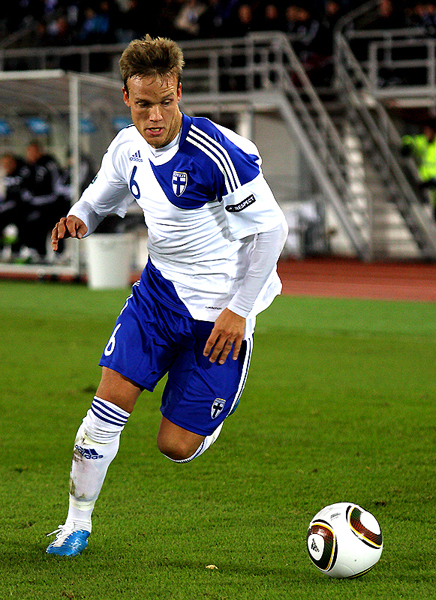
Väyrynen playing for Finland in 2010

Väyrynen was a key player for the Finland national team. He made his debut on 20 March 2002 against South Korea. Väyrynen's breakthrough for Finland came in June 2003, when he was the star performer in matches against Serbia and Montenegro and Italy. Väyrynen was also a key player for Finland at the 2001 FIFA World Youth Championship.

== Managerial career ==
In 2018, Väyrynen started as an assistant coach of Klubi 04, the reserve team of HJK Helsinki. In May 2019, Väyrynen was promoted to an assistant coach of HJK first team. He was named the head coach of Klubi 04 for the 2021 season, when the club played in Ykkönen.

On 24 November 2023, Väyrynen was named the manager of new Honka Akatemia. The club gained a position of Kakkonen from FC Honka's former reserve team, after Esport Honka was declared bankruptcy in November 2023.

== Television career ==
After his retirement, Väyrynen has also worked as a studio commentator for C More Finland for the UEFA Champions League and international matches.

== Career statistics ==
=== Club ===
Appearances and goals by club, season and competition
Club	Season	League			National cup (Note: Includes Finnish Cup, KNVB Cup, FA Cup)		Continental		Total	
Club	Season	Division	Apps	Goals	Apps	Goals	Apps	Goals	Apps	Goals
Lahti	1999	Veikkausliiga	15	1					15	1
Lahti	2000	Veikkausliiga	21	10					21	10
Lahti	Finland		36	11					36	11
Jokerit	2001	Veikkausliiga	30	4					30	4
Heerenveen	2001–02	Eredivisie	18	0					18	0
Heerenveen	2002–03	Eredivisie	22	4					22	4
Heerenveen	2003–04	Eredivisie	32	5					32	5
Heerenveen	2004–05	Eredivisie	29	8					29	8
Heerenveen	Total		101	17					101	17
PSV	2005–06	Eredivisie	11	2	2	0	1	0	14	2
PSV	2006–07	Eredivisie	17	0	4	0	8	1	29	1
PSV	2007–08	Eredivisie	1	0	0	0	2	0	3	0
PSV	Total		29	2	6	0	11	1	46	3
Heerenveen	2008–09	Eredivisie	17	1	3	0	6	2	26	3
Heerenveen	2009–10	Eredivisie	10	1	1	0	3	1	14	2
Heerenveen	2010–11	Eredivisie	30	9	1	1	0	0	31	10
Heerenveen	Total		57	11	5	1	9	3	71	15
Leeds United	2011–12	Championship	10	0	1	0	–		11	0
HJK Helsinki	2012	Veikkausliiga	11	3	0	0	4	1	15	4
HJK Helsinki	2013	Veikkausliiga	3	0	0	0	0	0	3	0
HJK Helsinki	2014	Veikkausliiga	25	2	3	1	10	1	38	4
HJK Helsinki	Finland		39	5	3	1	14	2	56	8
LA Galaxy	2015	MLS	19	0	0	0	4	1	23	1
HIFK	2016	Veikkausliiga	14	0					14	0
HIFK	2017	Veikkausliiga	27	0	4	1			31	1
HIFK	Total		41	0					45	1
Career total			275	48	11	1	24	5	310	54

=== International ===
Appearances and goals by national team and year
National team	Year	Apps	Goals
Finland	2002	1	0
Finland	2003	7	0
Finland	2004	8	0
Finland	2005	2	0
Finland	2006	8	2
Finland	2007	6	0
Finland	2008	9	1
Finland	2009	0	0
Finland	2010	7	2
Finland	2011	8	0
Finland	2012	1	0
Finland	2013	2	0
Finland	2014	2	0
Finland	2015	2	0
Total		64	5

Scores and results list Finland's goal tally first, score column indicates score after each Väyrynen goal.

List of international goals scored by Mika Väyrynen
No.	Date	Venue	Opponent	Score	Result	Competition
1	16 August 2006	Helsinki, Finland	Northern Ireland		1–2	Friendly
2	2 September 2006	Bydgoszcz, Poland	Poland		3–1	UEFA Euro 2008 qualifying
3	10 September 2008	Helsinki, Finland	Germany		3–3	2010 FIFA World Cup qualification
4	3 March 2010	Ta'Qali, Malta	Malta		2–1	Friendly
5	17 November 2010	Helsinki, Finland	San Marino		8–0	UEFA Euro 2012 qualifying

== Honours ==
PSV

- Eredivisie: 2005–06, 2006–07

Heerenveen

- KNVB Cup: 2008–09

HJK

- Veikkausliiga: 2012, 2013, 2014
- Finnish Cup: 2014

Individual

- Veikkausliiga Team of the Year: 2016
