= Carljohan Eriksson =

Finnish footballer (born 1995)

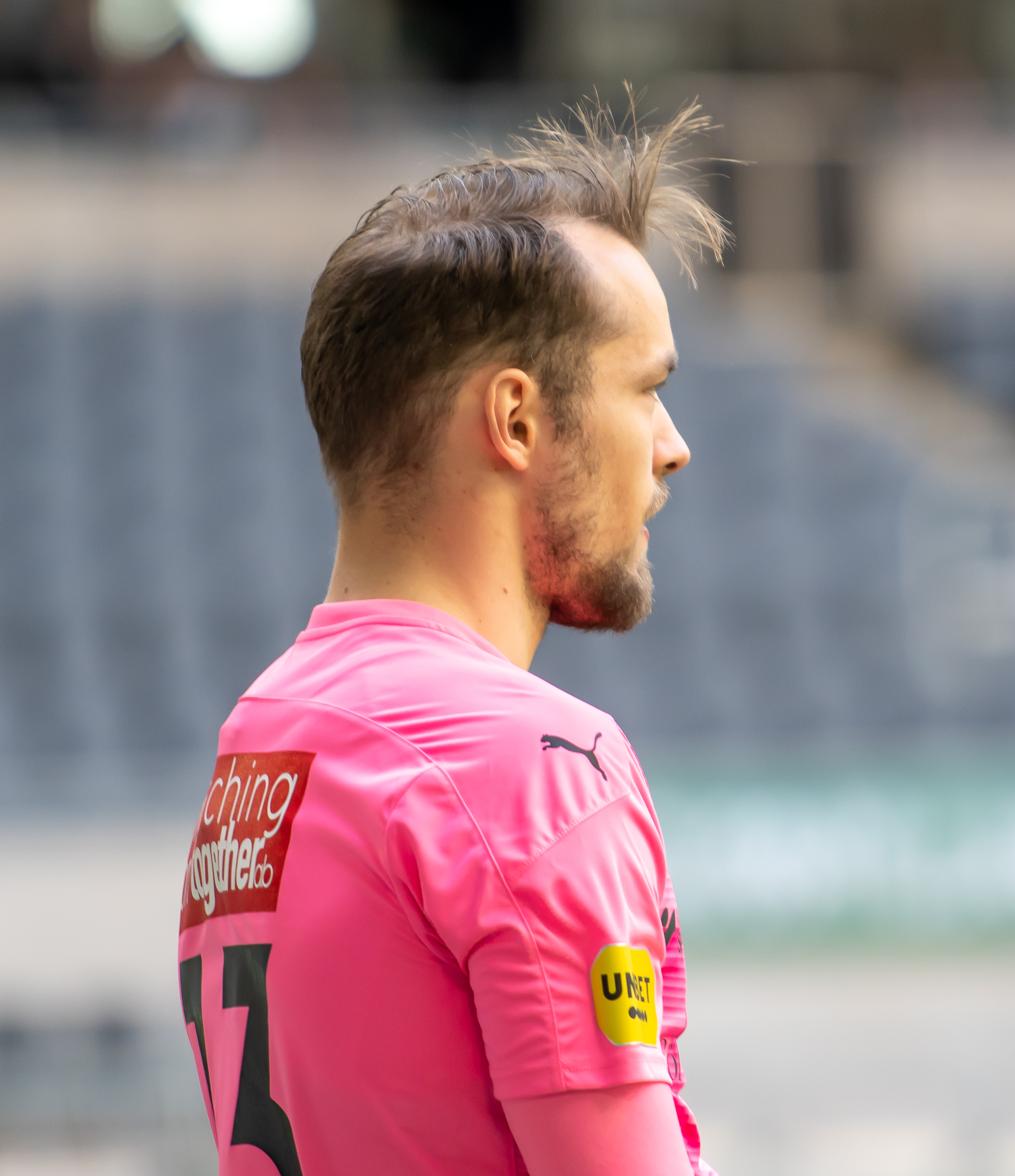
- Eriksson with Mjällby in 2021

Personal information
- Full name: Carljohan Daniel Viktor Eriksson
- Date of birth: 25 April 1995 (age 31)
- Place of birth: Helsinki, Finland
- Height: 1.91 m (6 ft 3 in)
- Position: Goalkeeper

Team information
- Current team: Nordsjælland
- Number: 22

Youth career
- 2007–2014: HJK

Senior career*
Years	Team	Apps	(Gls)
2012–2014	Klubi 04	56	(0)
2014	→ PK-35 Vantaa (loan)	2	(0)
2014	HJK	6	(0)
2015–2017	HIFK	56	(0)
2018	Jönköpings Södra	4	(0)
2019–2022	Mjällby	67	(0)
2022–2023	Dundee United	9	(0)
2023	→ Nordsjælland (loan)	0	(0)
2023–2024	Nordsjælland	2	(0)
2024–2026	Sarpsborg 08	16	(0)
2025	→ Sandefjord (loan)	10	(0)
2026–	Nordsjælland	0	(0)

International career^{‡}
2011	Finland U16	2	(0)
2012	Finland U17	3	(0)
2012–2013	Finland U18	11	(0)
2013	Finland U19	1	(0)
2015	Finland U21	3	(0)
2021–	Finland	1	(0)
- * Club domestic league appearances and goals as of 14 August 2026 ‡ National team caps and goals as of 1 September 2021

Carljohan Daniel Viktor Eriksson (born 25 April 1995) is a Finnish professional footballer who plays as a goalkeeper for Danish Superliga club Nordsjælland.

== Club career ==
He is a former youth talent of HJK of Helsinki. In addition to HJK, he has played two matches for PK-35 Vantaa of Vantaa on loan. He has also represented Finnish national team on different youth levels. He made his debut in the highest level of Finnish football, Veikkausliiga, in August 2014.

After his spell in HJK, he transferred to the local rival team HIFK in 2015.

On 6 January 2022, Eriksson signed with Scottish Premiership side Dundee United on a two-and-a-half-year deal, subject to work permit.

On 22 January 2023, Eriksson was loaned out to Danish Superliga side FC Nordsjælland until the end of the season. At the end of the season, the Danish club exercised their option to buy for the goalkeeper, who subsequently signed a three-year deal, for an undisclosed fee.

On 1 July 2024, Eriksson transferred to Norwegian Eliteserien side Sarpsborg on a deal until the end of 2026 for a €200,000 fee.

== International career ==
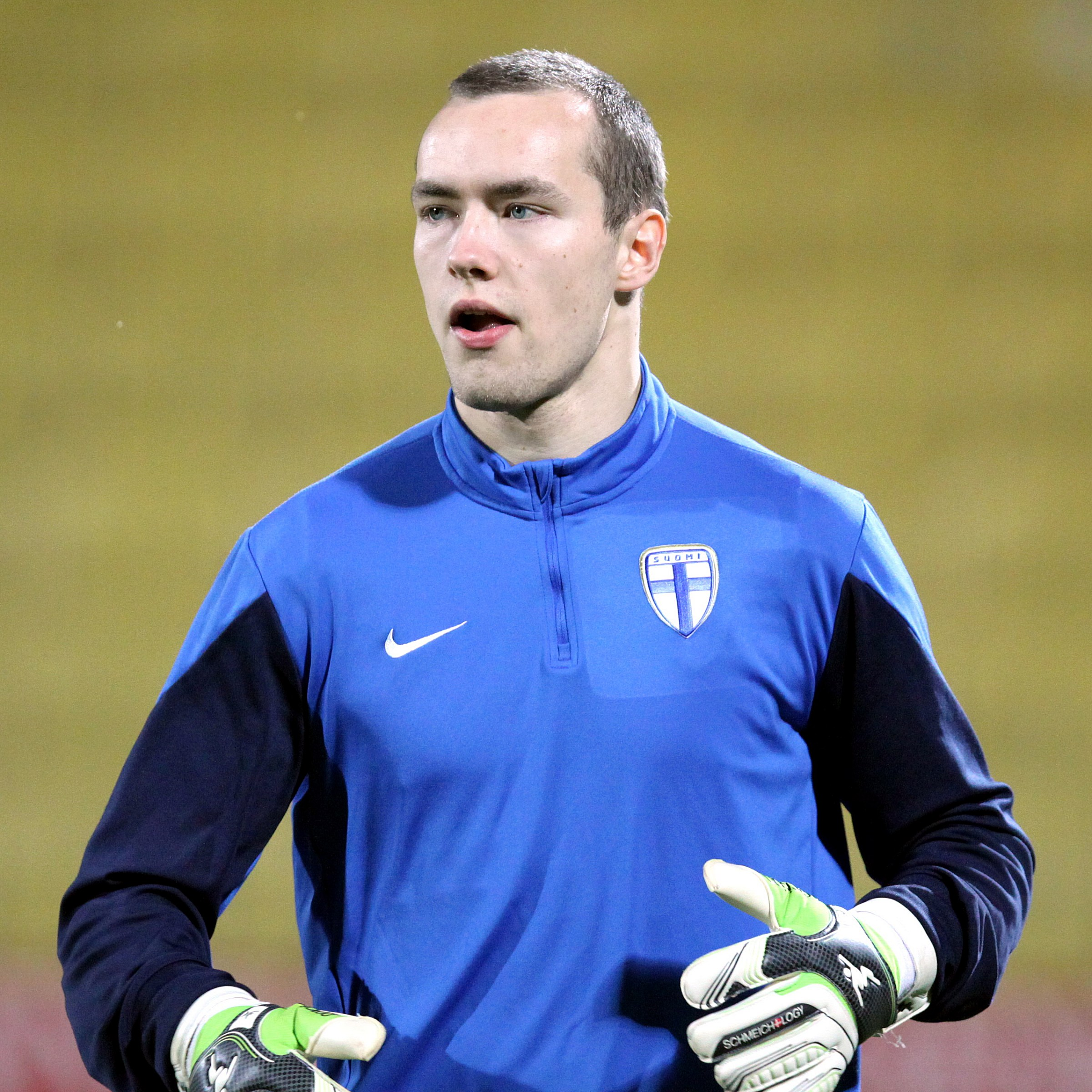
Eriksson with Finland U21 in 2015

Eriksson was called up for the UEFA Euro 2020 pre-tournament friendly match against Sweden on 29 May 2021. He made his debut for Finland on 1 September 2021 in a friendly against Wales, keeping a clean sheet and saving a penalty in a 0–0 draw at home.

== Career statistics ==
=== Club ===
As of 16 September 2026.

Appearances and goals by club, season and competition
Club	Season	League			National cup (Note: Includes Suomen Cup, Svenska Cupen and Danish Cup)		Continental		Other		Total	
Club	Season	Division	Apps	Goals	Apps	Goals	Apps	Goals	Apps	Goals	Apps	Goals
Klubi 04	2012	Kakkonen	23	0	2	0	–		–		25	0
Klubi 04	2013	Kakkonen	24	0	3	0	–		–		27	0
Klubi 04	2014	Kakkonen	9	0	–		–		–		9	0
Klubi 04	Career total		56	0	5	0	0	0	0	0	61	0
PK-35 Vantaa (loan)	2014	Ykkönen	2	0	–		–		–		2	0
HJK Helsinki	2014	Veikkausliiga	6	0	1	0	1 (Note: Includes UEFA Europa League)	0	3 (Note: Includes Finnish League Cup)	0	11	0
HIFK	2015	Veikkausliiga	20	0	1	0	–		2	0	23	0
HIFK	2016	Veikkausliiga	20	0	2	0	–		3	0	25	0
HIFK	2017	Veikkausliiga	16	0	4	0	–		–		20	0
HIFK	Career total		56	0	7	0	0	0	5	0	68	0
Jönköpings Södra	2018	Superettan	4	0	1	0	–		–		5	0
Mjällby	2019	Superettan	25	0	–		–		–		25	0
Mjällby	2020	Allsvenskan	22	0	4	0	–		–		26	0
Mjällby	2021	Allsvenskan	20	0	2	0	–		–		22	0
Mjällby	Career total		67	0	6	0	0	0	0	0	73	0
Dundee United	2021–22	Scottish Premiership	0	0	0	0	–		0	0	0	0
Dundee United	2022–23	Scottish Premiership	9	0	0	0	0	0	2 (Note: Includes Scottish League Cup)	0	11	0
Dundee United	Career total		9	0	0	0	0	0	2	0	11	0
Nordsjælland (loan)	2022–23	Danish Superliga	0	0	1	0	–		–		1	0
Nordsjælland	2023–24	Danish Superliga	2	0	1	0	1 (Note: Includes UEFA Europa Conference League)	0	–		4	0
Sarpsborg 08	2024	Eliteserien	16	0	0	0	–		–		16	0
Sarpsborg 08	2025	Eliteserien	0	0	4	0	–		–		4	0
Sarpsborg 08	Career total		16	0	4	0	0	0	0	0	20	0
Sandefjord (loan)	2025	Eliteserien	4	0	0	0	–		–		4	0
Nordsjælland	2026–27	Danish Superliga	0	0	1	0	0	0	—		1	0
Career total			222	0	27	0	2	0	10	0	261	0

=== International ===
As of match played 1 September 2021

Finland
Year	Apps	Goals
2021	1	0
Total	1	0

== Honours ==
Mjällby

- Superettan: 2019

Individual

- Allsvenskan: Goalkeeper of the year (2021)
