= Elias Tamburini =

Finnish footballer (born 1995)

Personal information
- Full name: Elias Alexander Tamburini
- Date of birth: 1 February 1995 (age 31)
- Place of birth: Essey-lès-Nancy, France
- Height: 1.76 m (5 ft 9 in)
- Position: Defender

Youth career
- –2013: HJK Helsinki
- 2014–2016: Saints Athletic Soccer Club

College career
Years	Team	Apps	(Gls)
2016–2018	Virginia Tech Hokies	?	(?)

Senior career*
Years	Team	Apps	(Gls)
2013–2014	Klubi 04	6	(0)
2014	Hostert	0	(0)
2018–2020	Grindavík	50	(0)
2021	ÍA	17	(0)
2022	Phönix Lübeck	9	(0)
- * Club domestic league appearances and goals as of 29 May 2022

Elias Tamburini (born 1 February 1995) is a Finnish footballer.
