= Oussou Konan Anicet =

Ivorian footballer (1989–2022)

Oussou Anicet
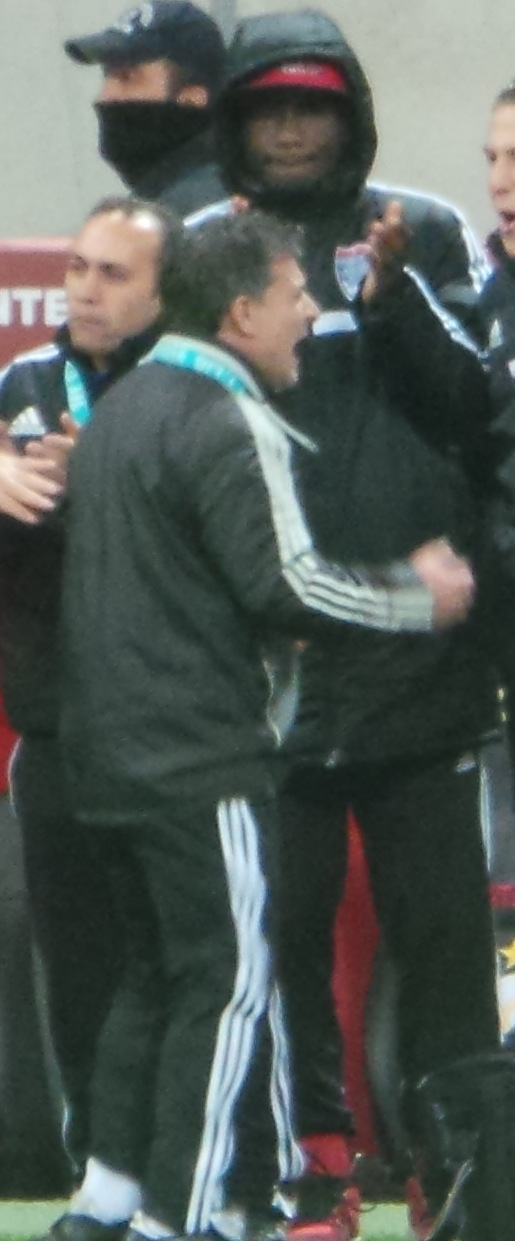

Personal information
- Full name: Oussou Konan Anicet Harian Maxmalon
- Date of birth: 23 January 1989
- Place of birth: Anyama, Ivory Coast
- Date of death: 3 January 2022 (aged 32)
- Place of death: Yopougon, Ivory Coast
- Height: 1.81 m (5 ft 11 in)
- Position: Forward

Youth career
- Africa Sports

Senior career*
Years	Team	Apps	(Gls)
2006–2008	Africa Sports		
2008–2010	Espérance		
2008	→ Stade Tunisien (loan)		
2009	→ AS Marsa (loan)		
2010–2012	Misr Lel-Makkasa	23	(11)
2012–2013	Al Ahly	0	(0)
2013	→ Hajer (loan)	9	(1)
2013	Gaziantep B.B.	10	(1)
2014	HJK	18	(4)
2014–2016	Tala'ea El-Gaish		(6)
2016–2017	Saham		
2017	CA Bizertin	4	(0)
2018–2019	San Pédro		
2019–2020	Stade Lausanne	18	(2)
2021	Nam Dinh	10	(7)
2021	Al-Bukiryah		
- * Club domestic league appearances and goals as of 2 February 2021

Oussou Konan Anicet Harian Maxmalon (23 January 1989 – 3 January 2022) was an Ivorian professional footballer who played as a forward.

== Career ==
Anicet started his career at Africa Sports, a club in his home town Abidjan, before moving to Tunisia in 2008 to join Espérance Sportive de Tunis, with which he signed for five years. After a half year loan spell with Stade Tunisien from Espérance Sportive de Tunis, he joined on 27 August 2009 AS Marsa on loan. He subsequently signed a three-year contract with the Egyptian club Al Ahly.

== Personal life and death ==
Anicet died on 3 January 2022, at the age of 32. His death was initially reported as resulting from a sudden illness. However, Vietnamese media later reported suspicions that he had been poisoned, citing information from people close to the footballer. The exact circumstances surrounding his death remained unclear.
