= Christian Tveit =

Norwegian football player (born 1992)

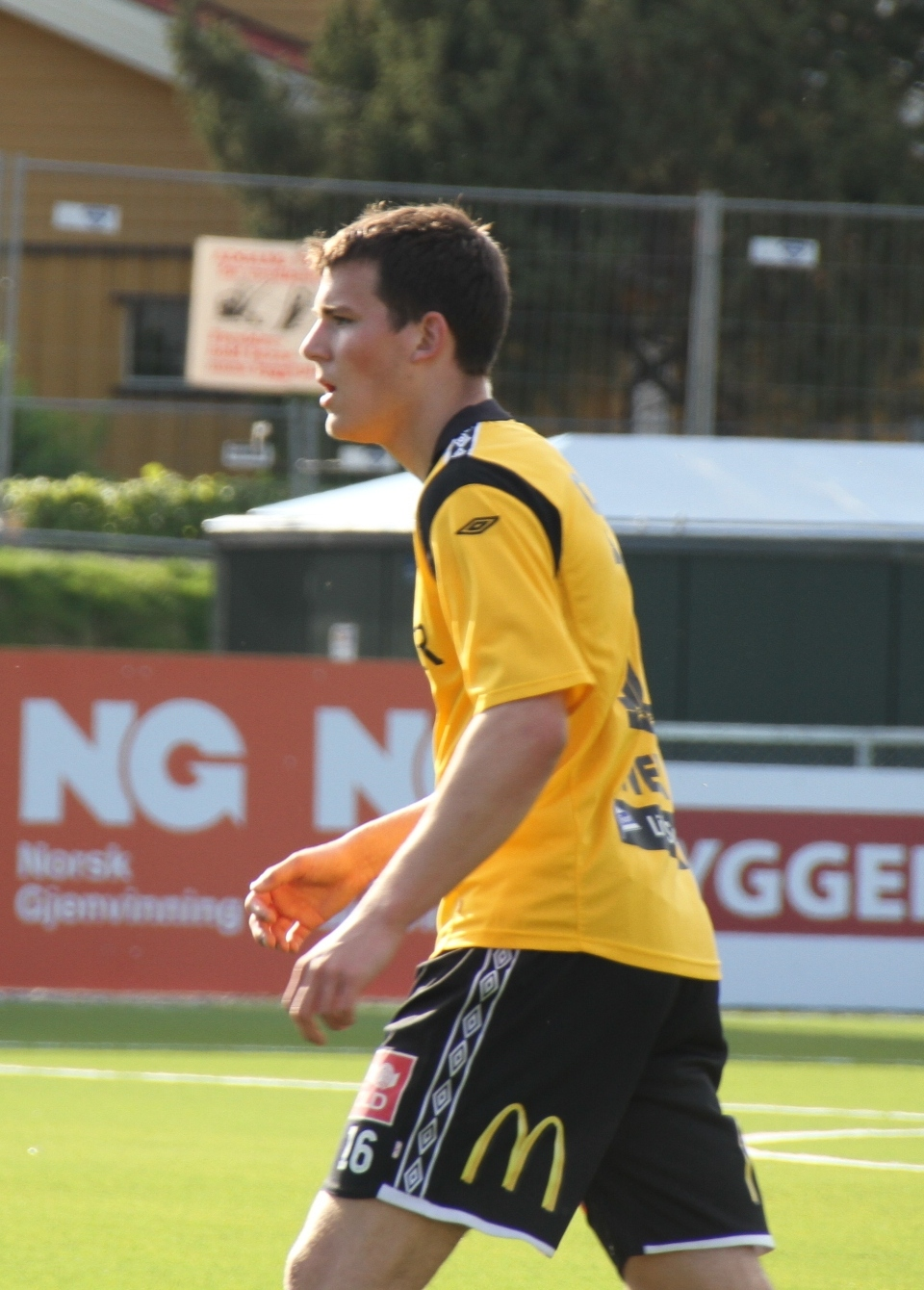

Personal information
- Date of birth: 10 January 1992 (age 34)
- Position: Forward

Team information
- Current team: Vindbjart
- Number: 18

Youth career
- Farsund

Senior career*
| Years | Team | Apps | (Gls) |
| 2008–2010 | Farsund | | |
| 2010 | Lyngdal | | |
| 2010–2011 | Mandalskameratene | | |
| 2012–2013 | Start | 23 | (2) |
| 2014 | Nest-Sotra | 7 | (1) |
| 2014–2016 | Arendal | 25 | (6) |
| 2017 | Fløy | 9 | (1) |
| 2018– | Vindbjart | 20 | (6) |
- * Club domestic league appearances and goals as of 15 December 2019

Christian Tveit (born 10 January 1992) is a Norwegian football striker who currently plays for Vindbjart FK.

Tveit hails from Farsund Municipality and began his career in Farsund IL. The club contested the Third Division between 2008 and 2010, but in 2010 Tveit joined the team Lyngdal IL, only to progress to Mandalskameratene in mid-2010. Ahead of the 2012 season he joined the best team in Southern Norway, IK Start.

IK Start won promotion to the 2013 Tippeligaen, where Tveit played 12 games. However, he decided to leave the club, and after trials with Mjøndalen IF and HJK Helsinki he signed for Nest-Sotra. He spent only half a season there as well, before moving back to Southern Norway and Arendal Fotball, coached by former Nest-Sotra player Knut Tørum. In 2017 he played for Third Division side Flekkerøy IL, before moving on to Vindbjart FK.
