= Nikolai Alho =

Finnish footballer (born 1993)

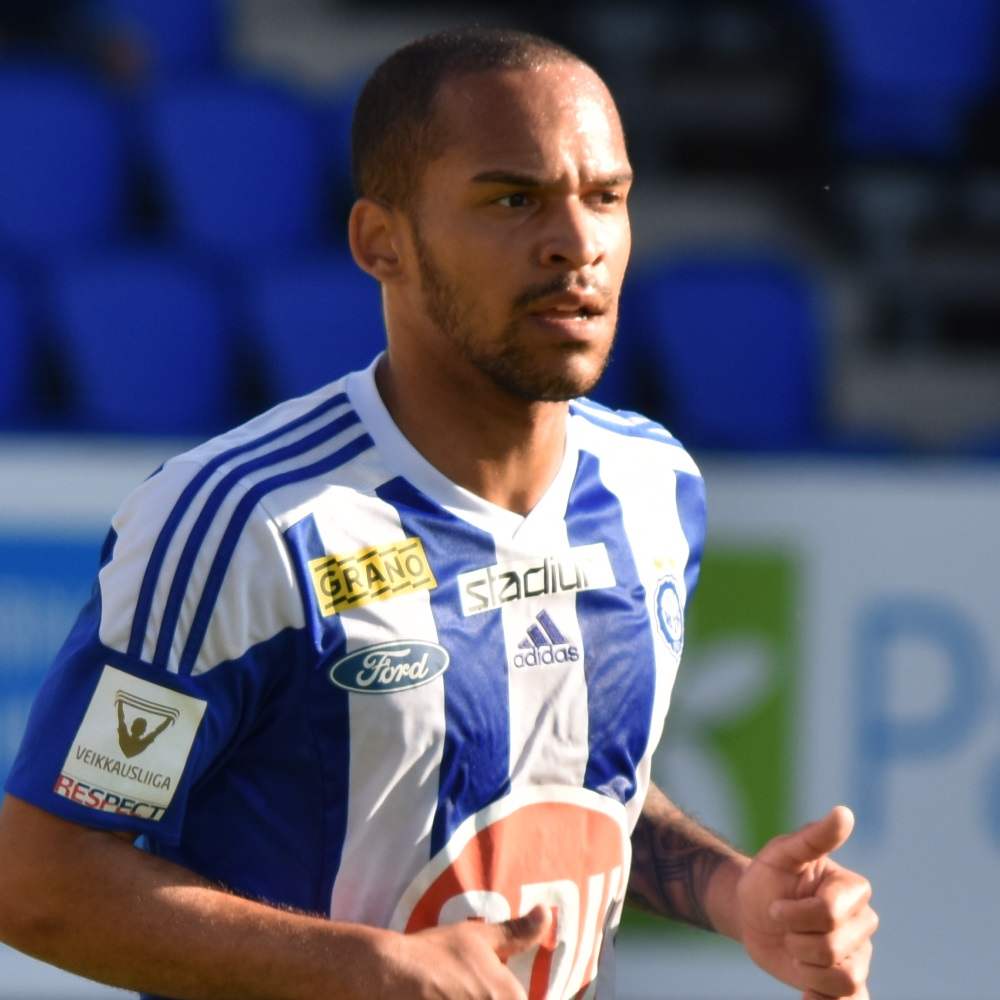
- Nikolai Alho with HJK in 2018

Personal information
- Full name: Nikolai Aleksanteri Alho
- Date of birth: 12 March 1993 (age 33)
- Place of birth: Helsinki, Finland
- Height: 1.72 m (5 ft 7 1/2 in)
- Position: Right-back

Team information
- Current team: HJK
- Number: 17

Youth career
- 1999: Honka
- HJK

Senior career*
Years	Team	Apps	(Gls)
2010−2012	Klubi 04	44	(13)
2012–2016	HJK	80	(13)
2012	→ Lahti (loan)	8	(1)
2017	Halmstad	21	(1)
2018–2020	HJK	70	(5)
2021–2022	MTK Budapest	17	(0)
2022–2024	Volos	75	(2)
2024–2026	Asteras Tripolis	41	(1)
2026–	HJK	9	(2)

International career^{‡}
2007−2008	Finland U15	6	(1)
2008−2009	Finland U16	15	(2)
2009−2010	Finland U17	12	(2)
2010−2011	Finland U18	12	(1)
2011	Finland U19	1	(0)
2012	Finland U20	2	(0)
2012	Finland U21	11	(0)
2014−2026	Finland	51	(0)
- * Club domestic league appearances and goals as of 12 November 2026 ‡ National team caps and goals as of 5 June 2026

Nikolai Aleksanteri Alho (born 12 March 1993) is a Finnish professional footballer who plays as a right-back for HJK. Initially a winger, Alho moved to a more defending role during his second stint with HJK.

== Club career ==
=== HJK ===
A product of his local side HJK, Alho came through its reserves, Klubi 04, before signing a professional contract on 2011, keeping him with the Helsinki-based side until 2014.

On 13 June 2013, he played his first league game for HJK and went on scoring twice in a 6−0 home win over FC Inter. On 17 September 2013, he signed a contract that was effective until the end of 2015.

In 2014 HJK qualified for the Europa League group stage. Alho scored the decisive goal against Rapid Wien in the qualifying play-off round match.

=== Loan to Lahti ===
On 22 August 2012, Alho was announced at Lahti on loan for the rest of the season.

=== Halmstad ===
Alho moved to Allsvenskan side Halmstads BK in January 2017. He left after one season. After a difficult season the team was relegated back to Superettan.

=== Return to HJK ===
Alho moved back to HJK for the 2018 season. After a successful season HJK won the Veikkausliiga. This was Alho's 4th domestic championship.

During the 2018 season Alho was also played as a right back by former HJK manager Mika Lehkosuo. Alho, known for his speed, aggressiveness and crossing ability, he was a perfect fit for a modern-day right back. Alho made the switch and had a successful season as right back during the 2019 season.

=== MTK Budapest ===
He signed for Hungarian Nemzeti Bajnokság I (NB I) side MTK Budapest at the beginning of the 2021 winter transfer window.

=== Volos ===
He signed for Super League Greece club Volos F.C. at the beginning of the 2022 winter transfer window, for an undisclosed fee. On 19 December 2022, his contract was extended until the end of the 2023–24 season. During the 2022–23 season, his first full season with the club‚ he played more minutes than any other player in his team, in all competitions combined. After the 2023–24 season, he announced he would depart from the club.

=== Asteras Tripolis ===
On 17 June 2024, Alho signed a two-year deal with a fellow Super League Greece club Asteras Tripolis on a free transfer.

=== Second HJK return ===
On 24 August 2026, HJK announced that Alho ahd return to the club on a contract until the end of the 2027 season.

== International career ==
He made his senior debut for the Finland national football team on 24 January 2014 at Nizwa Sports Complex in Nizwa, Oman, in a friendly match against Oman.

Alho was called up for the UEFA Euro 2020 pre-tournament friendly match against Sweden on 29 May 2021.

He announced his international retirement on 14 August 2026, having made 51 appearances.

== Personal life ==
Alho's biological father is Ghanaian and his mother is Finnish. He was adopted soon after by his English mother and Finnish father and was raised in Espoo with his younger sister, also adopted. He is a native speaker of both Finnish and English.

Alho attended the International School of Helsinki for the majority of his childhood, before transferring to Sports High School, the Mäkelänrinne Upper Secondary School.

== Outside football ==
Alho is also well known for making music. His debut single "Standing Right Here" went viral on YouTube and also hit radio stations in Finland in 2013. Alho was noticed by JVG the same year and signed a deal with their label, PME Records and WMG in December 2013. His contract with PME Records and WMG ended in November 2014. Alho has stated that he will continue to make music as a hobby but not sign again with a major label until after his football career is over. Football is and always has been his first priority.

Alho is also the owner of an independent record label, 325 Media. Other owners include Jesse Joronen and Valtteri Moren.

== Career statistics ==
=== Club ===
As of 22 May 2026

Appearances and goals by club, season and competition
Club	Season	League			National cup (Note: Includes Suomen Cup, Svenska Cupen, Magyar Kupa and Kypello Elladas)		League cup		Europe		Total	
Club	Season	Division	Apps	Goals	Apps	Goals	Apps	Goals	Apps	Goals	Apps	Goals
Klubi 04	2010	Ykkönen	22	1	—		—		—		22	1
Klubi 04	2011	Kakkonen	15	9	—		—		—		15	9
Klubi 04	2012	Kakkonen	7	3	—		—		—		7	3
Klubi 04	Total		44	13	0	0	0	0	0	0	44	13
HJK	2011	Veikkausliiga	0	0	0	0	1	0	—		1	0
HJK	2012	Veikkausliiga	9	0	2	1	6	0	1 (Note: Appearances in UEFA Champions League)	0	18	1
HJK	2013	Veikkausliiga	23	3	0	0	6	2	2	1	31	6
HJK	2014	Veikkausliiga	22	7	1	1	5	1	9 (Note: Appearances in UEFA Champions League and UEFA Europa League)	1	37	10
HJK	2015	Veikkausliiga	2	0	0	0	0	0	0	0	2	0
HJK	2016	Veikkausliiga	24	3	3	0	4	0	6 (Note: Appearances in UEFA Europa League)	0	37	3
HJK	Total		80	13	6	2	22	3	18	2	126	20
Lahti (loan)	2012	Veikkausliiga	8	1	—		—		—		8	1
Halmstad	2017	Allsvenskan	21	1	4	1	—		—		25	2
HJK	2018	Veikkausliiga	27	5	7	1	—		4	0	38	6
HJK	2019	Veikkausliiga	22	0	0	0	—		6	0	28	0
HJK	2020	Veikkausliiga	21	0	8	0	—		—		29	0
HJK	Total		70	5	15	1	0	0	10	0	95	6
MTK Budapest	2020–21	NB I	13	0	3	0	—		—		16	0
MTK Budapest	2021–22	NB I	4	0	1	0	—		—		5	0
MTK Budapest	Total		17	0	4	0	0	0	0	0	21	0
Volos	2021–22	Super League Greece	15	0	0	0	—		—		15	0
Volos	2022–23	Super League Greece	34	1	2	0	—		—		36	1
Volos	2023–24	Super League Greece	26	1	2	0	—		—		28	1
Volos	Total		75	2	4	0	0	0	0	0	79	2
Asteras Tripolis	2024–25	Super League Greece	20	0	3	0	—		—		23	0
Asteras Tripolis	2025–26	Super League Greece	21	1	1	0	—		—		22	1
Asteras Tripolis	Total		41	1	4	0	0	0	0	0	45	1
HJK	2026	Veikkausliiga	0	0	0	0	0	0	0	0	0	0
Career total			356	36	37	4	22	3	28	2	443	45

=== International ===
As of match played 5 June 2026

Finland
Year	Apps	Goals
2014	1	0
2015	0	0
2016	0	0
2017	0	0
2018	0	0
2019	0	0
2020	6	0
2021	10	0
2022	8	0
2023	9	0
2024	6	0
2025	7	0
2025	4	0
Total	51	0

== Honours ==
HJK

- Veikkausliiga: 2012, 2013, 2014, 2018, 2020
- Finnish Cup: 2014, 2020
- Finnish League Cup: 2015

Finland

- FIFA Series: 2026

Individual

- Veikkausliiga Team of the Year: 2020
