= 2014 Arizona United SC season =

Arizona United SC
2014 season
- Owner: (United States) Kyle Eng
- Manager: (United States) Michael Dellorusso
- Stadium: Peoria Sports Complex
- USL Pro: 9th Place
- USL Pro Playoffs: Did not qualify
- U.S. Open Cup: 4th round
- Top goalscorer: Long Tan (5); Jonathan Top (5)
- Highest home attendance: All: 4,018 (June 19 v. LA Galaxy; USOC 4th round); League: 3,588 (August 22 v. Oklahoma City)
- Lowest home attendance: 1,482 (June 14 v. Rochester)
- Average home league attendance: 2,395
Home colors	Away colors

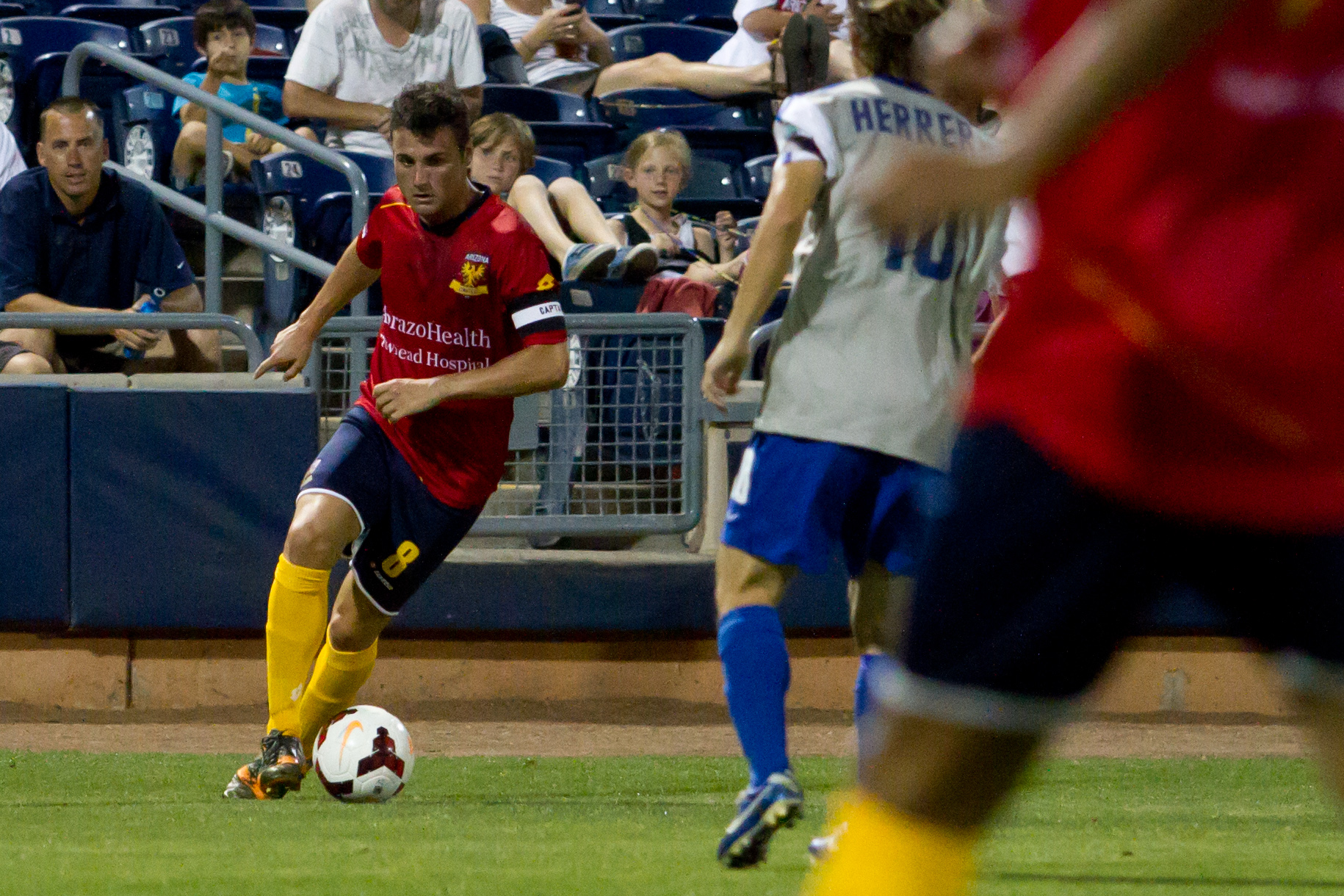

The 2014 Arizona United SC season was the club's first season of existence, playing in the USL Professional Division.

== USL Pro ==
All times from this point on Mountain Standard Time (UTC−07:00)

=== Results summary ===
Overall								Home						Away					
Pld	W	D	L	GF	GA	GD	Pts	W	D	L	GF	GA	GD	W	D	L	GF	GA	GD
28	10	5	13	32	47	−15	33^{†}	6	2	6	18	21	−3	4	3	7	14	26	−12

Source: Match reports

Round	1	2	3	4	5	6	7	8	9	10	11	12	13	14	15	16	17	18	19	20	21	22	23	24	25	26	27	28
Stadium	H	H	H	H	A	A	H	H	A	A	H	H	H	A	H	A	A	A	H	A	A	H	A	A	H	H	A	A
Result	L	W	D	W	L	W	L	L	L	D	L	W	D	L	L	L	W	D	W	D	L	L	L	W	W	W	L	W

Updated to match(es) played on September 9, 2014. Source: Match reports
A = Away; H = Home; W = Win; D = Draw; L = Loss

=== League results ===
April 12, 2014 1	Arizona United SC	0 - 4	Oklahoma City Energy FC	Peoria, Arizona
7:00pm	Woodberry (yellow card) 37' (red card) 43'	Report	Perry 46'; Greig 51'; Miller 65'; Evans (yellow card) 61'; Djeziri 71'	Stadium: Peoria Sports Complex; Attendance: 2,888; Referee: Israel Fernandez

April 19, 2014 2	Arizona United SC	2 - 1	Sacramento Republic FC	Peoria, Arizona
7:00pm	Top (yellow card) 16' (goal) 85'; Ruthven (yellow card) 27'; Swartzendruber 37'	Report	López 27'; Daly (yellow card) 45' (red card) 45'; Mirković (yellow card) 90'	Stadium: Peoria Sports Complex; Attendance: 3,014; Referee: Lucian Radoslovescu

April 25, 2014 3	Arizona United SC	1 - 1	LA Galaxy II	Peoria, Arizona
7:00pm	Dillon (yellow card) 31'; DelPiccolo 68'	Report	Mendiola 35'; Auras (yellow card) 38'; Sorto (yellow card) 46'; Diallo (red card) 89'	Stadium: Peoria Sports Complex; Attendance: 2,818; Referee: Charles Farr

May 3, 2014 4	Arizona United SC	2 - 1	Charlotte Eagles	Peoria, Arizona
7:00pm	Dacres 42'; Baladez 64'	Report	Herrera 76'	Stadium: Peoria Sports Complex; Attendance: 2,755; Referee: Alejandro Mariscal

May 9, 2014 5	Richmond Kickers	4 - 0	Arizona United SC	Richmond, Virginia
4:00pm	Spitz (yellow card) 26'; Davis 50'; Delicâte 62'; François 84'; Ruthven 88' (o.g.)	Report	Baladez (red card) 26'; Dillon (yellow card) 52'	Stadium: City Stadium; Attendance: 2,188; Referee: Mark Gorak

May 10, 2014 6	Harrisburg City Islanders	0 - 1	Arizona United SC	Harrisburg, Pennsylvania
4:00pm	Ekra (yellow card) 32'; Zizzi (yellow card) 63'	Report	Swartzendruber 19' (pen.); Kassel (yellow card) 69'	Stadium: Skyline Sports Complex; Attendance: 1,657; Referee: Alex Chilowicz

May 17, 2014 7	Arizona United SC	0 - 1	Orlando City	Peoria, Arizona
7:00pm	Dillon (yellow card) 42'	Report	Gallego 8' (o.g.); Redding (yellow card) 42'; Rusin (yellow card) 48'; Lopez (yellow card) 79'; Álvarez (yellow card) 83'	Stadium: Peoria Sports Complex; Attendance: 2,044; Referee: Younes Marrakchi

May 24, 2014 8	Arizona United SC	0 - 4	Chivas USA Reserves	Peoria, Arizona
7:00pm	Ruthven (red card) 71'; Dillon (yellow card) 90'	Report	Tyrpak 14'; Finley 15', 41', 74' (pen.); Fondy (yellow card) 30'; Hernandez (yellow card) 67'	Stadium: Peoria Sports Complex; Attendance: 2,211; Referee: Patrick O'Brian

May 31, 2014 9	Orange County Blues FC	2 - 0	Arizona United SC	Irvine, California
7:00pm	Sofia (yellow card) 9'; Russell 15' (yellow card) 89'; Momeni (yellow card) 39'; Cortez (yellow card) 46'; Suggs (yellow card) 58'; Cardenas (yellow card) 81'; Okai (yellow card) 84'; Roknipour 90+'	Report	Antúnez (yellow card) 37'; Baladez (yellow card) 90'; Toby (red card) 90+'; Kassel (red card) 90+'	Stadium: Anteater Stadium; Attendance: 538; Referee: Alejandro Mariscal

June 7, 2014 10	Sacramento Republic FC	1 - 1	Arizona United SC	Sacramento, California
7:30pm	Fochive (yellow card) 43'; Delbridge (yellow card) 56'; Bartlomé 90+' (yellow card) 90+'	Report	Saint Cyr (yellow card) 45'; Woodberry 67'; Wallace (yellow card) 76'	Stadium: Hughes Stadium; Attendance: 20,231; Referee: Matthew Buckman

June 11, 2014 11	Arizona United SC	1 - 2	Dayton Dutch Lions	Peoria, Arizona
7:30pm	Wallace 18'; DelPiccolo (yellow card) 53'; Dillon (yellow card) 66'; Ruthven (yellow card) 68'	Report	Schoenfeld 5', 36'; Garner (yellow card) 53'; Williams (yellow card) 89'	Stadium: Peoria Sports Complex; Attendance: 1,547; Referee: Jared Kennedy

June 14, 2014 12	Arizona United SC	1 - 0	Rochester Rhinos	Peoria, Arizona
7:00pm	Top 75' (pen.); Newton (yellow card) 90'; Baladez (yellow card) 90'	Report	Houapeu (yellow card) 57'; Hoffer (yellow card) 70'; Slogic (yellow card) 75'	Stadium: Peoria Sports Complex; Attendance: 1,482; Referee: Alex Del Angel

June 21, 2014 13	Arizona United SC	1 - 1	LA Galaxy II	Peoria, Arizona
7:00pm	Morrison 51'; Antúnez (yellow card) 74'; Woodberry (yellow card) 88'	Report	Bowen 17'	Stadium: Peoria Sports Complex; Attendance: 1,808; Referee: Jon Freemon

June 26, 2014 14	Sacramento Republic FC	1 - 0	Arizona United SC	Sacramento, California
7:30pm	Klimenta 13'; Powell (yellow card) 35'; Bartlomé (red card) 74'; Alvarez (yellow card) 79'	Report	Saint Cyr (yellow card) 32' (red card) 58'	Stadium: Bonney Field; Attendance: 8,000; Referee: Katja Koroleva

June 28, 2014 15	Arizona United SC	2 - 3	Orange County Blues FC	Peoria, Arizona
7:00pm	Woodberry (yellow card) 13'; Okafor 19'; Dacres 36'; DelPiccolo (yellow card) 90'	Report	Santana (yellow card) 33'; Russell 41' (pen.); Sofia (yellow card) 51'; Suggs 66'; Hoxie 90+'	Stadium: Peoria Sports Complex; Attendance: 1,839; Referee: Ramy Touchan

July 4, 2014 16	LA Galaxy II	4 - 2	Arizona United SC	Carson, California
4:00pm	Jamieson 16'; Rugg 18', 45'; Antúnez 41' (o.g.); Sorto (yellow card) 58'	Report	Okafor 19' (pen.); Kassel 90+'	Stadium: StubHub Center, Field #3; Attendance: 415; Referee: Alex Chilowicz

July 12, 2014 17	Orange County Blues FC	1 - 2	Arizona United SC	Irvine, California
7:00pm	Barron (yellow card) 35'; Roknipour (yellow card) 55'; Cardenas 77'; Gautrat (yellow card) 81'	Report	Woodberry (yellow card) 30'; Stisser 37'; Okafor 74'	Stadium: Anteater Stadium; Attendance: 586; Referee: Jared Kennedy

July 17, 2014 18	Oklahoma City Energy FC	1 - 1	Arizona United SC	Oklahoma City, Oklahoma
5:00pm	Djeziri (yellow card) 44'; Evans (yellow card) 81'; Thomas 90+' (pen.)	Report	DelPiccolo (yellow card) 44'; Tan 45+'; Dillon (yellow card) 90'; Top (yellow card) 90+'	Stadium: Pribil Stadium; Attendance: 2,813; Referee: Leland Grant

July 19, 2014 19	Arizona United SC	3 - 0	Orange County Blues FC	Peoria, Arizona
7:30pm	Kassel 22'; Tan 27' (yellow card) 35'; Top (yellow card) 82'; Saint Cyr (yellow card) 89'; Dacres 90+'	Report		Stadium: Peoria Sports Complex; Attendance: 2,238; Referee: Ramon Hernandez

July 25, 2014 20	Wilmington Hammerheads	0 - 0	Arizona United SC	Wilmington, North Carolina
4:30pm	Parratt (yellow card) 53'; Campbell (yellow card) 61'; Cole (yellow card) 90+'	Report	Antúnez (yellow card) 86'	Stadium: Legion Stadium; Attendance: 3,240; Referee: Dustin Thorne

July 26, 2014 21	Charleston Battery	2 - 0	Arizona United SC	Charleston, South Carolina
4:30pm	Kelly 25', 33'; Falvey (yellow card) 74'; Chang (yellow card) 87'	Report	Woodberry (yellow card) 54'; Garza (yellow card) 74'; Tan (yellow card) 74'; Stisser (yellow card) 89'	Stadium: Blackbaud Stadium; Attendance: 4,464; Referee: Chris Spivey

August 2, 2014 22	Arizona United SC	1 - 2	Sacramento Republic FC	Peoria, Arizona
7:30pm	Tan (yellow card) 32'; DelPiccolo (yellow card) 42'; Top 64' (yellow card) 90'; Morrison (yellow card) 65'; Robinson (yellow card) 85'	Report	Koval 53'; Braun 78'; Guzman (yellow card) 82'	Stadium: Peoria Sports Complex; Attendance: 1,888; Referee: Daniel Radford

August 9, 2014 23	LA Galaxy II	3 - 2	Arizona United SC	Carson, California
7:30pm	Rugg 9'; Jamieson 10'; Auras 37'; Villarreal (yellow card) 42'	Report	Kassel (yellow card) 47'; DelPiccolo 60'; Tan 72'; Morrison (yellow card) 77'	Stadium: StubHub Center; Attendance: 535; Referee: Christopher Calderon

August 14, 2014 24	Oklahoma City Energy FC	1 - 2	Arizona United SC	Oklahoma City, Oklahoma
5:00pm	Thomas (yellow card) 41'; Djeziri 77'	Report	Top 4'; Robinson (yellow card) 33'; Stisser (yellow card) 34'; Garza 74' (pen.) (yellow card) 79'; DelPiccolo (yellow card) 85'; Newton (yellow card) 87'	Stadium: Pribil Stadium; Attendance: 3,438; Referee: Jody Pinkerton

August 16, 2014 25	Arizona United SC	3 - 1	Pittsburgh Riverhounds	Peoria, Arizona
7:30pm	Okafor 56'; Top 61'; Stisser 78'	Report	Pridham 87'	Stadium: Peoria Sports Complex; Attendance: 3,408; Referee: Juan Colazo

August 22, 2014 26	Arizona United SC	1 - 0	Oklahoma City Energy FC	Peoria, Arizona
7:30pm	Morrison 76'; Dillon (yellow card) 88'; Dacres (red card) 90+'	Report	Howard (yellow card) 21' (red card) 45'; Hedrick (yellow card) 74'; Morad (red card) 90'	Stadium: Peoria Sports Complex; Attendance: 3,588; Referee: Ramy Touchan

August 25, 2014 27	Seattle Sounders Reserves	5 - 1	Arizona United SC	Tukwila, Washington
7:00pm	Neagle 28'; Okoli 32', 38'; Bowen 65'; Cooper 90'	Report	Woodberry 75' (yellow card) 77'; Ruthven (yellow card) 81'	Stadium: Starfire Sports Complex; Referee: Josh Wilkens

September 6, 2014 28	Pittsburgh Riverhounds	1 - 2	Arizona United SC	Pittsburgh, Pennsylvania
4:00pm	Čabrilo 6'; Earls (yellow card) 25'; Kerr (yellow card) 45'; Vincent (yellow card) 90'	Report	Tan 12', 75' (yellow card) 75'; Top (yellow card) 26'	Stadium: Highmark Stadium; Attendance: 2,718; Referee: Charles Murphy

=== Standings ===
Pos	Team	Pld	W	T	L	GF	GA	GD	Pts	Qualification
7	Wilmington Hammerheads (A)	28	9	11	8	35	33	+2	38	Playoffs
8	Harrisburg City Islanders (A)	28	10	7	11	45	46	−1	37	Playoffs
9	Arizona United SC	28	10	5	13	32	47	−15	33 (Note: Arizona was deducted two points for fielding an ineligible player on June 21 against LA Galaxy II.)	
10	Oklahoma City Energy FC	28	9	5	14	32	37	−5	32	
11	Pittsburgh Riverhounds	28	9	5	14	35	49	−14	32	

Source: USL Pro official standings
Rules for classification: 1) points; 2) goal difference; 3) number of goals scored.
(A) Advances to USL Pro Playoffs

== U.S. Open Cup ==
May 13, 2014 Second Round	Portland Timbers U23s	2 - 3	Arizona United SC	Portland, Oregon
7:00pm PDT	Fisher 11' (yellow card) 44'; Ribas (yellow card) 28'; Rose 45'; Alashe (yellow card) 51'	Report; Report	Dacres (yellow card) 26' (goal) 84'; Woodberry 88'; Antúnez (yellow card) 75' (goal) 90+'; Okafor (yellow card) 90+'	Stadium: Providence Park; Attendance: 833; Referee: Andrew Marihart

May 28, 2014 Third Round	Arizona United SC	2 - 1 (a.e.t.)	Oklahoma City Energy FC	Peoria, Arizona
7:30pm MST	Kassel (yellow card) 58'; Okafor 84'; Saint Cyr (yellow card) 86'; Woodberry (yellow card) 105'; Baladez 112'; Dillon (red card) 114'	Report; Report	Hedrick (yellow card) 27'; Shiffman (yellow card) 34'; Thomas (red card) 47'; Miller (yellow card) 55'; Greig 90+'; Doue (yellow card) 105'	Stadium: Peoria Sports Complex; Attendance: 1,538; Referee: Daniel Radford

June 18, 2014 Fourth round	Arizona United SC	1 - 2	LA Galaxy	Peoria, Arizona
7:30pm MST	Kassel 36'; Okafor (yellow card) 74'	Report; Report	Rogers (yellow card) 20'; Zardes 51', 53'; Gargan (yellow card) 84'	Stadium: Peoria Sports Complex; Attendance: 4,018; Referee: Alejandro Mariscal

== Friendlies ==
October 18, 2014	Arizona United SC	1 - 0	LA Galaxy II	Colorado Springs, Colorado
6:00pm	Garza 10'	Report; Report		Stadium: Sand Creek Stadium

== Statistics ==
#	Pos.	Name	GP	GS	Min.	Goals	Assists	A yellow rectangle, denoting the yellow penalty card shown to a player being cautioned	A red rectangle, denoting the red penalty card shown to a player being sent off
9	FW	(United States) (Guatemala) Jonathan Top	24	17	1,466	5	2	5	0
29	FW	(China) Long Tan	12	12	1,024	5	0	4	0
7	MF	(United States) Jon Okafor	28	12	1,342	4	1	0	0
13	FW	(United States) Kadeem Dacres	24	11	974	3	1	0	1
6	MF	(United States) Paolo DelPiccolo	27	26	2,187	2	3	5	0
8	MF	(United States) Matt Kassel	26	23	1,919	2	3	2	1
23	DF	(Scotland) Scott Morrison	24	21	1,923	2	1	2	0
22	DF	(United States) London Woodberry	24	19	1,831	2	0	5	1
17	FW	(United States) Brad Stisser	17	10	931	2	1	2	0
3	FW	(United States) Brandon Swartzendruber	10	8	596	2	1	0	0
18	MF	(United States) Bradlee Baladez	15	12	865	1	1	2	1
16	MF	(United States) Sam Garza	9	2	361	1	1	2	0
25	MF	(Costa Rica) Rodney Wallace	2	1	130	1	0	1	0
12	MF	(United States) Joey Dillon	25	21	1,925	0	0	6	0
2	DF	(United States) Tyler Ruthven	21	18	1,571	0	0	3	1
5	DF	(United States) Daniel Antunez	19	18	1,476	0	0	3	0
10	FW	(Zimbabwe) Schillo Tshuma	19	16	1,217	0	1	0	0
27	DF	(United States) Jalen Robinson	15	10	996	0	0	2	0
14	MF	(Haiti) Widner Saint-Cyr	12	11	950	0	0	2	1
20	DF	(Sierra Leone) Joseph Toby	11	5	591	0	1	0	1
26	DF	(United States) Bryan Gallego	6	6	507	0	1	0	0
15	FW	(United States) Benji Lopez	9	3	371	0	0	1	0
4	DF	(United States) Devon Grousis	5	2	164	0	0	0	0
11	MF	(United States) Charles Renken	4	0	65	0	0	0	0
30	MF	(United States) George Malki	4	0	43	0	0	0	0
19	MF	(Mexico) José Ramos	1	0	32	0	0	0	0

=== Goalkeepers ===
#	Name	GP	GS	Min.	SV	GA	GAA	SO	A yellow rectangle, denoting the yellow penalty card shown to a player being cautioned	A red rectangle, denoting the red penalty card shown to a player being sent off
1	(United States) Evan Newton	28	28	2,475	111	47	1.709	4	2	0
24	(United States) Jacole Turner	1	0	45	2	0	0.000	0	0	0

== Transfers ==
=== Loan in ===
Start date	End date	Position	No.	Player	From club
April 8, 2014		Forward	9	(Guatemala) Jonathan Top	(United States) FC Dallas
April 24, 2014		Defender	16	(United States) Bryan Gallego	(United States) Portland Timbers
May 8, 2014		Forward	10	(Zimbabwe) Schillo Tshuma	(United States) Portland Timbers
May 9, 2014		Defender	27	(United States) Jalen Robinson	(United States) D.C. United
May 30, 2014		Forward	15	(United States) Benji Lopez	(United States) Real Salt Lake
June 6, 2014		Forward	25	(Costa Rica) Rodney Wallace	(United States) Portland Timbers

=== Loan out ===
None

== See also ==
- 2014 in American soccer
- 2014 USL Pro season
- Arizona United SC
