= All-time Phoenix Rising FC roster =

This list comprises all players who have participated in at least one league match for Phoenix Rising FC (previously known as Arizona United SC) since the team's first season in 2014. Players who were on the roster but never played a first team game are not listed; players who appeared for the team in other competitions (US Open Cup, CONCACAF Champions League, etc.) but never actually made a USL Championship appearance are noted at the bottom of the page where appropriate.

A "†" denotes players who only appeared in a single match.

== A ==
- (United States) Saad Abdul-Salaam
- (United States) Seyi Adekoya
- (United States) Tobi Adewole
- (Spain) Jose Aguinaga
- (United States) Daniel Antúnez
- (Australia) Panos Armenakas
- (United States) Efetobo Aror †
- (United States) Eder Arreola
- (Venezuela) Manuel Arteaga
- (Ghana) Solomon Asante
- (Ghana) Richmond Antwi
- (United States) Eric Avila
- (Ghana) Gladson Awako
- (United States) Carlos Anguiano
- (Venezuela) Juan Carlos Azócar

== B ==
- (United States) Bradlee Baladez
- (Spain) Jon Bakero
- (United States) Gibson Bardsley
- (England) Jack Barmby
- (United States) Lamar Batista
- (New Zealand) Noah Billingsley
- (United States) Kyle Bjornethun
- (United States) Tristan Blackmon
- (England) Tyler Blackwood
- (United States) Milton Blanco
- (Senegal) Pape Mar Boye
- (Mexico) Omar Bravo
- (United States) Shaft Brewer Jr.

== C ==
- (France) Rémi Cabral
- (United States) Joey Calistri
- (United States) Tony Cascio
- (United States) Channing Chasten
- (Jamaica) Dennis Chin
- (United States) A. J. Cochran
- (United States) Josh Cohen
- (United States) Jackson Conway
- (United States) Chris Cortez
- (United States) Nick Costa
- (Argentina) Emil Cuello
- (United States) Jose Cuevas

== D ==
- (United States) Kadeem Dacres
- (Azerbaijan) Rufat Dadashov
- (United States) Mike da Fonte
- (United States) Edward Delgado
- (United States) Paolo DelPiccolo
- (United States) Aaron Dennis
- (United States) Robbie Derschang
- (United States) Amadou Dia
- (United States) Joey Dillon
- (Tanzania) Irakoze Donasiyano
- (Italy) Giulio Doratiotto
- (Ivory Coast) Didier Drogba
- (United States) Devante Dubose
- (Sierra Leone) Mustapha Dumbuya
- (United States) Niall Dunn †

== E ==
- (England) Otis Earle
- (Nigeria) David Egbo
- (United States) Marcus Epps

== F ==
- (United States) Marcus Ferkranus
- (Peru) Collin Fernandez
- (United States) Joe Farrell
- (Germany) Romeo Filipović
- (Jamaica) Junior Flemmings
- (United States) Ryan Flood
- (Turks and Caicos Islands) Billy Forbes
- (Poland) Dariusz Formella
- (Jamaica) Kevaughn Frater
- (Venezuela) Alejandro Fuenmayor

== G ==
- (Venezuela) Erickson Gallardo
- (United States) Bryan Gallego
- (United States) Danny Garcia
- (United States) Sam Garza
- (United States) Blair Gavin
- (England) Jordan Gibbons
- (United States) Brock Granger
- (Canada) A. J. Gray
- (United States) J. J. Greer
- (United States) Devon Grousis
- (United States) Iván Gutiérrez

== H ==
- (United States) Sam Hamilton
- (United States) Blaize Hardy †
- (Panama) Carlos Harvey
- (United States) Jacob Harris
- (Norway) Sivert Haugli
- (Mexico) José Hernández
- (El Salvador) Romilio Hernandez
- (United States) Matthew Hurlow-Paonessa
- (Scotland) Greg Hurst

== J ==
- (United States) Adam Jahn
- (Jamaica) Jason Johnson
- (United States) Spencer Johnson
- (The Gambia) Lamin Jawneh

== K ==
- (United States) Ansuh Kanneh †
- (United States) Matt Kassel
- (United States) Jeremy Kelly
- (United States) Peter Kelly
- (United States) Darnell King
- (United States) TJ Knight †
- (Ghana) Owusu-Ansah Kontoh
- (Netherlands) Daniel Krutzen
- (United States) Lagos Kunga

== L ==
- (Jamaica) Kevon Lambert
- (United States) Austin Ledbetter
- (Mexico) Jonathan Levin
- (Spain) David Loera
- (United States) Benji Lopez
- (Jamaica) Damion Lowe
- (Germany) Ben Lundt
- (United States) Zac Lubin

== M ==
- (Mexico) Manuel Madrid
- (United States) Josh Martinez †
- (Ivory Coast) Doueugui Mala
- (United States) George Malki
- (Jamaica) Darren Mattocks
- (United States) Duncan McCormick
- (United States) Kevin Mearse †
- (Spain) Santi Moar
- (Scotland) Scott Morrison
- (United States) Liam Mullins †
- (United States) Eddie Munjoma
- (Spain) Victor Muñoz
- (New Zealand) James Musa

== N ==
- (United States) Evan Newton
- (The Gambia) Baboucarr Njie
- (Argentina) Rocco Ríos Novo

== O ==
- (United States) Jon Okafor

== P ==
- (Spain) Javi Pérez
- (United States) Joshua Pérez
- (Costa Rica) Brandon Poltronieri

== Q ==
- (United States) Aodhan Quinn

== R ==
- (Germany) Patrick Rakovsky
- (England) Peter Ramage
- (Mexico) José Ramos †
- (United States) Andre Rawls
- (Italy) Claudio Repetto
- (United States) Charles Renken
- (England) Jordan Rideout
- (Canada) Luca Ricci
- (Canada) Alessandro Riggi
- (Germany) Julian Ringhof
- (Venezuela) Edgardo Rito
- (United States) Jalen Robinson
- (Mexico) Arturo Rodríguez
- (England) Luke Rooney
- (Mexico) Damian Rosales
- (United States) Freddy Ruiz
- (United States) Tyler Ruthven

== S ==
- (Haiti) Widner Saint Cyr
- (United States) Hayden Sargis
- (Liberia) Prince Saydee
- (United States) JP Scearce
- (United States) Luke Schaefer †
- (United States) Tate Schmitt
- (Canada) Jordan Schweitzer
- (Venezuela) Luis Manuel Seijas
- (United States) Alex Shinsky
- (United States) Mike Seth
- (United States) Christian Silva
- (Brazil) Matheus Silva
- (United States) Zakari Smith †
- (United States) Ben Spencer
- (United States) Jordan Stagmiller
- (Scotland) Sam Stanton
- (Sweden) John Stenberg
- (England) Jordan Stewart
- (United States) Brad Stisser
- (United States) Brandon Swartzendruber

== T ==
- (China) Long Tan
- (South Africa) Miguel Timm
- (Sierra Leone) Joseph Toby
- (Guatemala) Jonathan Top
- (Senegal) Mohamed Traore
- (Mexico) Danny Trejo
- (Brazil) Gabriel Torres
- (Zimbabwe) Schillo Tshuma
- (United States) Jacole Turner †

== U ==
- (Nigeria) Uchenna Uzo
- (Nigeria) Henry Uzochukwu

== V ==
- (United States) Rob Valentino
- (Argentina) Fede Varela
- (Jamaica) Peter-Lee Vassell
- (United States) Victor Vásquez
- (United States) Devin Vega
- (United States) Cameron Vickers
- (United States) Minh Vu

== W ==
- (United States) Kody Wakasa
- (United States) Evan Waldrep
- (Costa Rica) Rodney Wallace
- (England) Matt Watson
- (United States) Adam West
- (United States) Andrew Wheeler-Omiunu
- (Republic of Ireland) Corey Whelan
- (United States) JJ Williams
- (Cyprus) Tom Williams
- (United States) London Woodberry
- (United States) Carl Woszczynski
- (England) Shaun Wright-Phillips
- (England) Laurence Wyke

== Z ==
- (Venezuela) Renzo Zambrano
- (Colombia) Eduard Zea
