= 2014 U.S. Open Cup =

101st edition of cup competition in American soccer

2014 Lamar Hunt U.S. Open Cup
Tournament details
- Country: United States
- Teams: 80

Final positions
- Champions: Seattle Sounders FC (4th title)
- Runners-up: Philadelphia Union
- 2015–16 CONCACAF Champions League: Seattle Sounders FC

Tournament statistics
- Matches played: 79
- Goals scored: 284 (3.59 per match)
- Top goal scorer: Kenny Cooper (6)

The 2014 Lamar Hunt U.S. Open Cup was the 101st edition of the oldest ongoing competition in American soccer. Qualification began in November 2013 in the fifth tier. The USSF announced the tournament format on April 24, 2014.

The defending champions D.C. United were eliminated in the 4th Round by the Rochester Rhinos. Seattle Sounders FC defeated the Philadelphia Union 3-1 (after extra time) to claim their 4th Open Cup championship in 6 years.

The cash prize amounts remain the same as last year. The champion receives $250,000 and the runner-up receives $60,000. Also, the team from each lower division that advanced the furthest received $15,000: Laredo Heat (USL PDL), Rochester Rhinos (USL Pro), and Atlanta Silverbacks (NASL).

== Qualification ==
All United States Division I (MLS), Division II (NASL) & Division III (USL Pro) teams qualify automatically.

| Enter in First Round | Enter in Second Round | | Enter in Third Round | Enter in Fourth Round |
| NPSL/USL PDL/USCS/USASA/USSSA; 5 teams/5 teams/1 team/4 teams/1 team | NPSL/USL PDL/USASA/USL Pro; 6 teams/14 teams/6 teams/14 teams | | NASL; 8 teams | MLS; 16 teams |
| NPSL: CD Aguiluchos; Detroit City FC; FC Sonic Lehigh Valley; New York Red Bulls U-23; San Diego Flash; USL PDL: Los Angeles Misioneros; GPS Portland Phoenix; Ventura County Fusion; Vermont Voltage; Western Mass Pioneers; US Club Soccer: Corinthians USA; USASA: Mass Premier Soccer; PSA Elite; Red Force FC; RWB Adria; USSSA: Colorado Rovers | NPSL: Brooklyn Italians; Chattanooga FC; GBFC Thunder; Jacksonville United; RVA FC; Tulsa Athletics; USL PDL: Austin Aztex; Baltimore Bohemians; Carolina Dynamo; Fresno Fuego; Jersey Express; Laredo Heat ^{$}; Michigan Bucks; Ocala Stampede; Ocean City Nor'easters; Orlando City U-23; Panama City Beach Pirates; Portland Timbers U23s; Reading United; Real Colorado Foxes | USASA: Cal FC; Des Moines Menace; Greek American AA; Icon FC; NTX Rayados; FC Schwaben AC; USL Pro: Arizona United SC; Charleston Battery; Charlotte Eagles; Dayton Dutch Lions; Harrisburg City Islanders; LA Galaxy II; Oklahoma City Energy FC; Orange County Blues FC; Orlando City; Pittsburgh Riverhounds; Richmond Kickers; Rochester Rhinos ^{$}; Sacramento Republic FC; Wilmington Hammerheads FC | Atlanta Silverbacks ^{$}; Carolina RailHawks; Fort Lauderdale Strikers; Indy Eleven; Minnesota United FC; New York Cosmos; San Antonio Scorpions; Tampa Bay Rowdies | Chicago Fire; Chivas USA; Colorado Rapids; Columbus Crew; FC Dallas; D.C. United; Houston Dynamo; Los Angeles Galaxy; New England Revolution; New York Red Bulls; Philadelphia Union ^{$$}; Portland Timbers; Real Salt Lake; San Jose Earthquakes; Seattle Sounders FC ^{$$$}; Sporting Kansas City |

- $: Winner of $15,000 bonus for advancing the furthest in the competition from their respective divisions.
- $$: Winner of $60,000 for being the runner-up in the competition.
- $$$: Winner of $250,000 for winning the competition.

== Brackets ==
First Round; May 7
USSSA | Colorado Rovers | 1
USASA | Red Force FC | 2
PDL | Ventura County Fusion | 2
NPSL | CD Aguiluchos | 1
PDL | Western Mass Pioneers | 4
USASA | Mass Premier Soccer | 1
NPSL | San Diego Flash
USCS | Corinthians USA (forfeit)
USASA | PSA Elite | 1(3)
PDL | Los Angeles Misioneros | 1(2)
NPSL | New York Red Bulls (NPSL) | 2
PSL | Vermont Voltage | 1
NPSL | Detroit City FC | 2(1)
USASA | RWB Adria | 2(3)
PDL | GPS Portland Phoenix | 0
NPSL | FC Sonic Lehigh Valley (aet) | 1

Second Round; May 13–14
PDL | Laredo Heat | 2
USASA | Red Force FC | 1
PDL | Ventura County Fusion | 1
USLP | Sacramento Republic FC | 2
PDL | Fresno Fuego | 2
USLP | Orange County Blues FC | 0
PDL | Austin Aztex | 4(2)
USASA | NTX Rayados | 4(4)
USLP | Rochester Rhinos (aet) | 2
PDL | Western Mass Pioneers | 1
PDL | Reading United | 5
NPSL | GBFC Thunder | 2
USASA | FC Schwaben AC | 0
USLP | Dayton Dutch Lions | 2
USASA | Des Moines Menace | 3
PDL | Real Colorado Foxes | 0
USLP | LA Galaxy II | 6
USASA | Cal FC | 1
NPSL | San Diego Flash (forfeit)
USASA | PSA Elite
USLP | Pittsburgh Riverhounds | 3
NPSL | New York Red Bulls (NPSL) | 1
PDL | Michigan Bucks | 0
USASA | RWB Adria (aet) | 1
NPSL | RVA FC | 1
USLP | Richmond Kickers | 6
PDL | Ocean City Nor'easters | 0
USASA | Greek American AA | 2
PDL | Jersey Express | 2
NPSL | Brooklyn Italians | 4
PDL | Baltimore Bohemians | 4
USASA | Icon FC | 1
NPSL | FC Sonic Lehigh Valley | 0
USLP | Harrisburg City Islanders | 4
PDL | Portland Timbers U23s | 2
USLP | Arizona United SC | 3
NPSL | Tulsa Athletics | 0
USLP | Oklahoma City Energy FC | 2
USLP | Charlotte Eagles | 3
PDL | Carolina Dynamo | 1
NPSL | Chattanooga FC | 3
USLP | Wilmington Hammerheads FC | 1
USLP | Charleston Battery | 4
PDL | Panama City Beach Pirates | 0
PDL | Orlando City U-23 | 2
NPDL | Jacksonville United | 1
USLP | Orlando City | 4
PDL | Ocala Stampede | 1

Third Round; May 27–28
NASL | Fort Lauderdale Strikers | 2
PDL | Laredo Heat | 3
USLP | Sacramento Republic FC | 6
PDL | Fresno Fuego | 0
NASL | San Antonio Scorpions | 4
USASA | NTX Rayados | 2
USLP | Rochester Rhinos (aet) | 2
PDL | Reading United | 1
NASL | Indy Eleven | 5
USLP | Dayton Dutch Lions | 2
USASA | Des Moines Menace | 0
NASL | Minnesota United FC | 1
USLP | LA Galaxy II | 0(1)
USASA | PSA Elite | 0(3)
USLP | Pittsburgh Riverhounds (aet) | 3
USASA | RWB Adria | 2
USLP | Richmond Kickers | 2
USASA | Greek American AA | 1
NASL | New York Cosmos | 2
NPSL | Brooklyn Italians | 0
PDL | Baltimore Bohemians | 2
USLP | Harrisburg City Islanders | 4
USLP | Arizona United SC (aet) | 2
USLP | Oklahoma City Energy FC | 1
NASL | Carolina RailHawks | 2
USLP | Charlotte Eagles | 0
NPSL | Chattanooga FC | 0
NASL | Atlanta Silverbacks | 5
USLP | Charleston Battery | 2(11)
PDL | Orlando City U-23 | 2(12)
USLP | Orlando City | 4
NASL | Tampa Bay Rowdies | 1

Fourth Round; June 11–18
NASL | Carolina RailHawks | 1(3)
MLS | Chivas USA | 1(2)
USLP | Arizona United SC | 1
MLS | LA Galaxy | 2
MLS | Houston Dynamo | 1
PDL | Laredo Heat | 0
MLS | FC Dallas | 2
NASL | San Antonio Scorpions | 0
MLS | Philadelphia Union (aet) | 3
USLP | Harrisburg City Islanders | 1
NASL | New York Cosmos | 3
MLS | New York Red Bulls | 0
USLP | Richmond Kickers | 2
MLS | New England Revolution | 3
USLP | Rochester Rhinos | 1
MLS | D.C. United | 0
MLS | Seattle Sounders FC | 5
USASA | PSA Elite | 0
MLS | San Jose Earthquakes | 2
USLP | Sacramento Republic | 1
MLS | Sporting Kansas City | 2
NASL | Minnesota United FC | 0
MLS | Portland Timbers | 3
PDL | Orlando City U-23 | 0
MLS | Colorado Rapids | 5
USLP | Orlando City | 2
NASL | Atlanta Silverbacks | 2
MLS | Real Salt Lake | 1
MLS | Chicago Fire | 2
USLP | Pittsburgh Riverhounds | 1
MLS | Columbus Crew (aet) | 2
NASL | Indy Eleven | 1

Fifth Round; June 24–25
NASL | Carolina RailHawks (aet) | 1
MLS | LA Galaxy | 0
MLS | Houston Dynamo | 2
MLS | FC Dallas | 3
MLS | Philadelphia Union (aet) | 2
NASL | New York Cosmos | 1
MLS | New England Revolution | 2
USLP | Rochester Rhinos | 1
MLS | Seattle Sounders FC | 1(4)
MLS | San Jose Earthquakes | 1(1)
MLS | Sporting Kansas City | 1
MLS | Portland Timbers | 3
MLS | Colorado Rapids | 1
NASL | Atlanta Silverbacks | 2
MLS | Chicago Fire (aet) | 4
MLS | Columbus Crew | 2

Quarterfinals; July 8–9
NASL | Carolina RailHawks | 2
MLS | FC Dallas | 5
MLS | Philadelphia Union | 2
MLS | New England Revolution | 0
MLS | Seattle Sounders FC (aet) | 3
MLS | Portland Timbers | 1
NASL | Atlanta Silverbacks | 1
MLS | Chicago Fire | 3

Semifinals; Aug 12–13
MLS | FC Dallas | 1(3)
MLS | Philadelphia Union | 1(4)
MLS | Seattle Sounders FC | 6
MLS | Chicago Fire | 0

Final; Sep 16
MLS | Philadelphia Union | 1
MLS | Seattle Sounders FC (aet) | 3

- Host team listed first
- Bold winner

== Entries ==
| Round | Total clubs remaining | Clubs involved this round | Winners from previous round | New entries this round | Leagues entering at this round |
|---|---|---|---|---|---|
| First round | 80 | 16 | 0 | 16 | National Premier Soccer League (five teams); USL Premier Development League (five teams); US Club Soccer (one team); United States Adult Soccer Association (four teams); United States Specialty Sports Association (one team) |
| Second round | 72 | 48 | 8 | 40 | National Premier Soccer League (six teams); USL Premier Development League (14 teams); United States Adult Soccer Association (six teams); USL Pro (14 teams) |
| Third round | 48 | 32 | 24 | 8 | North American Soccer League |
| Fourth round | 32 | 32 | 16 | 16 | Major League Soccer |
| Fifth round | 16 | 16 | 16 | none | none |
| Quarterfinals | 8 | 8 | 8 | none | none |
| Semifinals | 4 | 4 | 4 | none | none |
| Final | 2 | 2 | 2 | none | none |

== Match details ==
=== First Round ===
The First Round draw was announced Thursday, April 24, 2014. A total of 16 teams will compete, ten from the fourth tier of American soccer and six from the fifth tier.

| May 7 | GPS Portland Phoenix (4-PDL) | 0–1 (a.e.t.) | FC Sonic Lehigh Valley (4-NPSL) | Portland, Maine |
| 19:00 ET | Lupinelli (yellow card) 109' | Report | Mustac (yellow card) 107'; Spencer 115' | Stadium: Memorial Stadium; Attendance: 80; Referee: Boris Senic |

| May 7 | Detroit City FC (4-NPSL) | 2–2 (a.e.t.) (1–3 p) | RWB Adria (5-USASA) | Livonia, Michigan |
| 19:00 ET | Arnone 71'; Harris (yellow card) 59' (red card) 116'; Myers (yellow card) 90+'; Taylor 77' | Report | Baciu 14', 90+'; Mesanovic (yellow card) 44'; Bond (yellow card) 52'; Vučemilović-Grgić (red card) 109'; Huffman (red card) 116' | Stadium: Stevenson High School; Attendance: 753; Referee: Jason White |
| | Penalties |
| | Savage (penalty missed); Edwardson (penalty missed); Taylor (penalty missed); Arnone (penalty scored) | | Mesanovic (penalty scored); Morris (penalty scored); Keran (penalty missed); McKinney (penalty scored) |

| May 7 | Western Mass Pioneers (4-PDL) | 4–1 | Mass Premier Soccer (5-USASA) | Ludlow, Massachusetts |
| 19:30 ET | Willis (yellow card) 20'; Daniels 70', 89'; Alencar, Jr. 74', 80' | Report | Bedoya 11'; Ashenfelter (yellow card) 80' | Stadium: Lusitano Stadium; Attendance: 411; Referee: Alexander Cerjan |

| May 7 | New York Red Bulls U-23 (4-NPSL) | 2–1 | Vermont Voltage (4-PDL) | Whippany, New Jersey |
| 20:00 ET | Thomsen 18'; Anderson 35' | Report | Saldana 68' | Stadium: Red Bull Training Facility; Referee: Alex Chilowicz |

| May 7 | Colorado Rovers (5-USSSA) | 1–2 | Red Force FC (5-USASA) | Highlands Ranch, Colorado |
| 20:00 MT | | Report | | Stadium: Shea Stadium; Referee: Adam Zarrin |

| May 7 | Ventura County Fusion (4-PDL) | 2–1 | CD Aguiluchos (4-NPSL) | Ventura, California |
| 19:00 PT | Kennedy 53' (pen.); Gregory 64' | Report | | Stadium: Ventura College; Referee: Reed Christy |

| May 7 | San Diego Flash (4-NPSL) | forfeit by | Corinthians USA (5-USCS) | San Diego, California |
| 19:00 PT | | Report | | Stadium: Mira Mesa Senior High School |

| May 7 | PSA Elite (5-USASA) | 1–1 (a.e.t.) (3–2 p) | Los Angeles Misioneros (4-PDL) | Carson, California |
| 19:30 PT | Preciado 114' | Report | Castro 94' | Stadium: StubHub Center Training Field; Referee: Jesse Yzaguirre |

=== Second Round ===
The Second Round draw was announced Thursday, April 24, 2014. A total of 48 teams will compete, including the eight winners from the first round and 40 new entries from the 3rd and 4th tiers of American soccer. The lowest ranked teams in this round are RWB Adria, Red Force FC, and PSA Elite of the 5th tier United States Adult Soccer Association.

| May 13 | Portland Timbers U23s (4-PDL) | 2–3 | Arizona United (3-USL Pro) | Portland, Oregon |
| 19:00 PT | Fisher 11' (yellow card) 44'; Ribas (yellow card) 28'; Rose 45'; Alashe (yellow card) 51' | Report; Report | Dacres (yellow card) 26' (goal) 84'; Woodberry 88'; Antúnez (yellow card) 75' (goal) 90+'; Okafor (yellow card) 90+' | Stadium: Providence Park; Attendance: 833; Referee: Andrew Marihart |

| May 14 | Orlando City U-23 (4-PDL) | 2–1 | Jacksonville United (4-NPSL) | Lake Mary, Florida |
| 16:30 ET | Blackwood 30'; Caronis 58' (o.g.) | Report; Report | Krizanovic 45' | Stadium: Seminole Soccer Complex; Referee: Daniel Gutierrez |

| May 14 | FC Schwaben AC (4-USASA) | 0–2 | Dayton Dutch Lions (3-USL Pro) | Buffalo Grove, Illinois |
| 16:00 CT | | Report | Garner 36'; Angoy–Cryuff 70' | Stadium: Schwaben Athletic Club; Referee: Dimitar Chavdarov |

| May 14 | Baltimore Bohemians (4-PDL) | 4–1 | Icon FC (4-USASA) | Catonsville, Maryland |
| 19:00 ET | Kansaye 15'; Martz 22'; Allen 62'; Graham 84' | Report | Niziolek 50' | Stadium: UMBC Stadium; Referee: William Chapman |

| May 14 | Pittsburgh Riverhounds (3-USL Pro) | 3–1 | New York Red Bulls U-23 (4-NPSL) | Pittsburgh, Pennsylvania |
| 19:00 ET | Kerr 10'; Angulo 68'; Vincent 81' | Report | Sheridan 12' (pen.) | Stadium: Highmark Stadium; Referee: Vito Testa, Jr. |

| May 14 | Ocean City Nor'easters (4-PDL) | 0–2 | Greek American AA (4-USASA) | Ocean City, New Jersey |
| 19:00 ET | | Report Report 2 | | Stadium: Carey Stadium; Attendance: 300; Referee: Alex Chilowicz |

| May 14 | Reading United (4-PDL) | 5–2 | GBFC Thunder (4-NPSL) | Reading, Pennsylvania |
| 19:00 ET | | | | Stadium: Gurski Stadium; Referee: Darth Newman |

| May 14 | Richmond Kickers (3-USL Pro) | 6–1 | RVA FC (4-NPSL) | Richmond, Virginia |
| 19:00 ET | Asante 26'; Spitz 35'; Yeisley 45+2'; Hanley 62', 64'; Davis IV 88' | Report | Orlando 65' | Stadium: Sports Backers Stadium; Attendance: 753; Referee: Charles Carson |

| May 14 | Charlotte Eagles (3-USL Pro) | 3–1 | Carolina Dynamo (4-PDL) | Charlotte, North Carolina |
| 19:00 ET | | | | Stadium: Queens University Sports Complex; Referee: Christopher Spivey |

| May 14 | FC Sonic Lehigh Valley (4-NPSL) | 0–4 | Harrisburg City Islanders (3-USL Pro) | Whitehall, Pennsylvania |
| 19:05 ET | | Report | Barril 48'; Pettis 82'; Baúque 90+1'; DiPrima 90+3' | Stadium: Whitehall H.S. Soccer Stadium; Referee: Ernie Constantine |

| May 14 | Michigan Bucks (4-PDL) | 0–1 (a.e.t.) | RWB Adria (5-USASA) | Pontiac, Michigan |
| 18:30 CT | | Report | | Stadium: Ultimate Soccer Arenas; Referee: Sorin Stoica |

| May 14 | Orlando City (3-USL Pro) | 4–1 | Ocala Stampede (4-PDL) | Lake Mary, Florida |
| 19:30 ET | | Report | | Stadium: Seminole Soccer Complex; Referee: Matthew Miscannon |

| May 14 | Charleston Battery (3-USL Pro) | 4–0 | Panama City Beach Pirates (4-PDL) | Charleston, South Carolina |
| 19:30 ET | | Report | | Stadium: Blackbaud Stadium; Referee: Agostino Minasola |

| May 14 | Chattanooga FC (4-NPSL) | 3–1 | Wilmington Hammerheads (3-USL Pro) | Chattanooga, Tennessee |
| 18:30 ET (moved from 19:30 ET) | Winter 21', 62'; Ochieng 90+' | | Oliviera 41' | Stadium: Finley Stadium; Attendance: 1,502; Referee: Kevin Terry, Jr. |

| May 14 | Rochester Rhinos (3-USL Pro) | 2–1 (a.e.t.) | Western Mass Pioneers (4-PDL) | Rochester, New York |
| 19:35 ET | Houapeu 110'; Obasi 114' | Report | Daniels 117' | Stadium: Sahlen's Stadium; Attendance: 3,781; Referee: John Douglas |

| May 14 | Jersey Express (4-PDL) | 2–4 | Brooklyn Italians (4-NPSL) | Newark, New Jersey |
| 20:00 ET | | | | Stadium: J. Malcolm Simon Stadium; Referee: Neil Barbulescu |

| May 14 | Tulsa Athletics (4-NPSL) | 0–2 | Oklahoma City Energy FC (3-USL Pro) | Tulsa, Oklahoma |
| 19:30 CT | Howard (yellow card) 26'; Saari (yellow card) 39'; Leung (red card) 77'; Brocks (red card) 90+' | Report | Leichty 10'; Caringi 69' | Stadium: Athletics Stadium; Referee: Nima Saghafi |

| May 14 | Des Moines Menace (4-USASA) | 3–0 | Real Colorado Foxes (4-PDL) | West Des Moines, Iowa |
| 19:30 CT | Wright 5'; Bartlett (?); Dong 53' | Report | | Stadium: Valley Stadium; Referee: Trent Payne |

| May 14 | Austin Aztex (4-PDL) | 4–4 (a.e.t.) (2–4 p) | NTX Rayados (4-USASA) | Austin, Texas |
| 19:30 CT | | | | Stadium: House Park; Referee: Pedro Trejo, Jr. |

| May 14 | Fresno Fuego (4-PDL) | 2–0 | Orange County Blues (3-USL Pro) | Fresno, California |
| 18:00 PT | | | | Stadium: Chukchansi Park; Referee: Michael Zapata |

| May 14 | Laredo Heat (4-PDL) | 2–1 | Red Force FC (5-USASA) | Laredo, Texas |
| 20:15 CT | | | | Stadium: Texas A&M International University Soccer Complex; Referee: Hayden Edwards |

| May 14 | Sacramento Republic FC (3-USL Pro) | 2–1 | Ventura County Fusion (4-PDL) | Sacramento, California |
| 19:00 PT | Delbridge 59'; Daly (yellow card) 76'; Collins 78'; Mirković (yellow card) 83' | Report | Rideout 36'; Vale (yellow card) 77'; Torre (red card) 88' | Stadium: Cosumnes River College; Attendance: 1,347; Referee: Alex Del Angel |

| May 14 | San Diego Flash (4-NPSL) | forfeit to | PSA Elite (5-USASA) | San Diego, California |
| 19:00 PT | | Report | | Stadium: Mira Mesa Senior High School |

| May 14 | LA Galaxy II (3-USL Pro) | 6–1 | Cal FC (4-USASA) | Carson, California |
| 19:30 PT | Covarrubias 6'; Diallo 24'; Bowen 30', 33'; McBean 45'; Đoković 82' | Report | Reza 50' | Stadium: StubHub Center Track & Field Stadium; Referee: William Hoffman |

=== Third Round ===
A total of 32 teams will compete in the Third Round, including the 24 winners from the previous round and eight teams from the North American Soccer League. The lowest ranked teams in this round are RWB Adria and PSA Elite of the 5th tier United States Adult Soccer Association.

| May 27 | Rochester Rhinos (3-USL Pro) | 2–1 (a.e.t.) | Reading United AC (4-PDL) | Rochester, New York |
| 19:35 ET | Mendoza 66'; Rolfe 119' | Report | Surkamp 65' | Stadium: Sahlen's Stadium; Attendance: 2,360; Referee: Chris Trottier |

| May 28 | Richmond Kickers (3-USL Pro) | 2–1 | Greek American AA (4-USASA) | Richmond, Virginia |
| 19:00 ET | Davis 48'; Hanley 81' | Report | Megaloudis 21' | Stadium: Sports Backers Stadium; Attendance: 880; Referee: Chris Spivey |

| May 28 | New York Cosmos (2-NASL) | 2–0 | Brooklyn Italians (4-NPSL) | Queens, New York |
| 19:30 ET | Ockford 16'; Chirishian 30' | Report | | Stadium: SJU Belson Stadium; Attendance: 1,851; Referee: Andres Pfefferkorn |

| May 28 | Baltimore Bohemians (4-PDL) | 2–4 | Harrisburg City Islanders (3-USL Pro) | Towson, Maryland |
| 17:30 ET | Onwuka 74', 87' | Report | Langley 8', 80'; McLaughlin 31', 37' (pen.) | Stadium: Calvert Hall College HS; Referee: Charles Carson |

| May 28 | Indy Eleven (2-NASL) | 5–2 | Dayton Dutch Lions (3-USL Pro) | Indianapolis, Indiana |
| 19:30 ET | Smith 26', 30', 88'; Ambersley 43'; Mares 46' | Report | Schoenfeld 66' (pen.); Walker 76' | Stadium: IUPUI Carroll Stadium; Attendance: 9,181; Referee: Dimitar Chavdarov |

| May 28 | Pittsburgh Riverhounds (3-USL Pro) | 3–2 (a.e.t.) | RWB Adria (5-USASA) | Pittsburgh, Pennsylvania |
| 19:00 ET | Earls 40'; John 80'; Arteaga 112' | Report | Hüffman 44'; Bond 62' | Stadium: Highmark Stadium; Referee: John Douglas |

| May 28 | Des Moines Menace (4-USASA) | 0–1 | Minnesota United FC (2-NASL) | West Des Moines, Iowa |
| 19:30 CT | | Report | Ramirez 86' | Stadium: Valley Stadium; Attendance: 2,196; Referee: Nima Saghafi |

| May 28 | Fort Lauderdale Strikers (2-NASL) | 2–3 | Laredo Heat (4-PDL) | Fort Lauderdale, Florida |
| 19:45 ET | De Mujica 8'; Pérez 12' | Report | Villanueva 27'; Alvarado 86'; Bayona 90+2' (pen.) | Stadium: Lockhart Stadium; Attendance: 785; Referee: Caleb Mendez |

| May 28 | San Antonio Scorpions (2-NASL) | 4–2 | NTX Rayados (4-USASA) | San Antonio, Texas |
| 19:30 CT | Restrepo 49'; Touray 64', 69'; Soto 76' (pen.) | Report | Spence 12'; Rodríguez 19' | Stadium: Toyota Field; Attendance: 3,411; Referee: Luis Guardia |

| May 28 | Arizona United SC (3-USL Pro) | 2–1 (a.e.t.) | Oklahoma City Energy FC (3-USL Pro) | Peoria, Arizona |
| 19:00 MST | Okafor 84'; Baladez 112' | Report | Greig 90' | Stadium: Peoria Sports Complex; Attendance: 1,538; Referee: Daniel Radford |

| May 28 | Sacramento Republic FC (3-USL Pro) | 6–0 | Fresno Fuego (4-PDL) | Sacramento, California |
| 19:30 PT | Vuković 45'; Braun 53'; Stewart 61'; López 76'; Klimenta 81'; Evans 89' | Report | | Stadium: Hughes Stadium; Attendance: 1,523; Referee: Nestor Chávez |

| May 28 | Carolina RailHawks (2-NASL) | 2–0 | Charlotte Eagles (3-USL Pro) | Cary, North Carolina |
| 19:30 ET | Albadawi 14'; Davidson 45' | Report | | Stadium: WakeMed Soccer Park; Attendance: 1,432; Referee: Matthew Jozaitis |

| May 28 | LA Galaxy II (3-USL Pro) | 0–0 (a.e.t.) (1–3 p) | PSA Elite (5-USASA) | Carson, California |
| 19:30 PT | | Report | | Stadium: StubHub Center; Referee: Michael Zapata |

| May 28 | Chattanooga FC (4-NPSL) | 0–5 | Atlanta Silverbacks (2-NASL) | Chattanooga, Tennessee |
| 19:30 ET | Reakes (yellow card) 53'; Dunstan (red card) 90' | Report | Sandoval 12'; Burgos 15', 43'; Poku (yellow card) 53'; McCaulay 68'; Chavez 71' | Stadium: Finley Stadium; Attendance: 4,058; Referee: Kevin Terry, Jr. |

| May 28 | Charleston Battery (3-USL Pro) | 2–2 (a.e.t.) (11–12 p) | Orlando City U-23 (4-PDL) | Charleston, South Carolina |
| 19:30 ET | Kelly 63', 68' (pen.) | Report | Williams 26'; Brody 45' | Stadium: Blackbaud Stadium; Attendance: 1,428; Referee: Howard Ash |

| May 28 | Orlando City (3-USL Pro) | 4–1 | Tampa Bay Rowdies (2-NASL) | Lake Mary, Florida |
| 19:30 ET | Molino 11', 42'; Turner (yellow card) 12' da Luz 20'; Mbengue 26'; Hertzog (yellow card) 86' | Report | Wallace (yellow card) 23'; Wagner 45'; Hill (red card) 86' | Stadium: Seminole Soccer Complex; Attendance: 1,500; Referee: Ted Unkel |

=== Fourth Round ===
A total of 32 teams will compete in the Fourth Round, including the 16 winners from the previous round and 16 teams from Major League Soccer. The lowest ranked team in this round is PSA Elite of the 5th tier United States Adult Soccer Association.

| June 11 | Houston Dynamo (1-MLS) | 1–0 | Laredo Heat (4-PDL) | Houston, Texas |
| 21:00 CT | López 38'; Deric (red card) 52' | Report | Braem (yellow card) 32' (yellow-red card) 40'; F. Garcia (yellow card) 70' | Stadium: BBVA Compass Stadium; Attendance: 4,929; Referee: Nima Saghafi (Oklahoma) |

| June 11 | San Jose Earthquakes (1-MLS) | 2–1 | Sacramento Republic FC (3-USL Pro) | San Francisco, California |
| 19:30 PT | Harris (yellow card) 32'; Stephenson 45' (pen.); Lenhart (yellow card) 45+2'; Cato 73'; Harden (yellow card) 83'; Pierazzi (yellow card) 90+2' | Report | Delbridge (yellow card) 3'; Braun 42'; Bartlomé (yellow card) 43' (yellow-red card) 77' | Stadium: Kezar Stadium; Attendance: 3,788; Referee: Juan Guzman (California) |

| June 14 | Atlanta Silverbacks (2-NASL) | 2–1 | Real Salt Lake (1-MLS) | Chamblee, Georgia |
| 20:00 ET | Burgos 33', (yellow card) 55'; Gavin (yellow card) 44'; Poku 90+2' | Report | Findley 10'; Maund (yellow card) 22'; Salcedo (yellow card) 65' | Stadium: Atlanta Silverbacks Park; Attendance: 5,000; Referee: Armando Villarreal (Texas) |

| June 14 | Carolina RailHawks (2-NASL) | 1–1 (a.e.t.) (3–2 p) | Chivas USA (1-MLS) | Cary, North Carolina |
| 20:00 ET | Schilawski 29'; Ståhl (yellow card) 53' | Report | Finley 40' | Stadium: WakeMed Soccer Park; Attendance: 4,273; Referee: Mark Kadlecik (North Carolina) |
| | Penalties |
| | Albadawi (penalty missed); Tobin (penalty scored); Low (penalty missed); Schilawski (penalty scored); Martínez (penalty missed); Aa. King (penalty missed); Jackson (penalty scored) | | Pelletieri (penalty scored); Torres (penalty scored); Zavaleta (penalty missed); Kennedy (penalty missed); Avila (penalty missed); Tyrpak (penalty missed); Delgado (penalty missed) |

| June 14 | New York Cosmos (2-NASL) | 3–0 | New York Red Bulls (1-MLS) | Hempstead, New York |
| 20:30 ET | Stokkelien 8', 73'; Szetela (yellow card) 62'; Noselli 78' | Report | Sekagya (yellow card) 21'; Duvall (red card) 78'; Wright-Phillips (yellow card) 90' | Stadium: Shuart Stadium; Attendance: 9,364; Referee: Kevin Terry, Jr. (Texas) |

| June 17 | Philadelphia Union (1-MLS) | 3–1 (a.e.t.) | Harrisburg City Islanders (3-USL Pro) | Chester, Pennsylvania |
| 19:00 ET | Gaddis (yellow card) 79'; Edu 89', (yellow card) 108'; Wenger 110', 117'; Hoppenot (yellow card) 112' | Report | Langley (yellow card) 32'; Pelletier 39'; Edinho (yellow card) 94' | Stadium: PPL Park; Referee: Nima Saghafi (Oklahoma) |

| June 17 | Rochester Rhinos (3-USL Pro) | 1–0 | D.C. United (1-MLS) | Rochester, New York |
| 19:05 ET | Rolfe 27' | Report | Birnbaum (yellow card) 50' (yellow-red card) 60' | Stadium: Sahlen's Stadium; Attendance: 2,256; Referee: Robert Sibiga (New York) |

| June 17 | Columbus Crew (1-MLS) | 2–1 (a.e.t.) | Indy Eleven (2-NASL) | Akron, Ohio |
| 19:30 ET | Añor 4'; Bedell (red card) 34'; Paladini (red card) 110'; Clark (yellow card) 112'; Arrieta 114' (pen.) | Report | Ferreira-Mendes (yellow card) 27'; Corrado (yellow card) 45+1'; Smith 62'; Estridge (yellow card) 78'; Moore (yellow card) 105' | Stadium: FirstEnergy Stadium; Attendance: 1,913; Referee: Dimitar Chavdarov (Illinois) |

| June 17 | Colorado Rapids (1-MLS) | 5–2 | Orlando City (3-USL Pro) | Commerce City, Colorado |
| 19:00 MT | Brown 35', 47', 55'; LaBrocca 42'; Powers 73' | Report | Mbengue 23', (yellow card) 68'; Boden 71' | Stadium: Dick's Sporting Goods Park; Attendance: 2,119; Referee: Younes Marrakchi (Colorado) |

| June 17 | FC Dallas (1-MLS) | 2–0 | San Antonio Scorpions (2-NASL) | Frisco, Texas |
| 20:00 CT | Escobar (yellow card) 57', (goal) 81'; Castillo 74' | Report | Hassli (yellow card) 69' | Stadium: Toyota Stadium; Attendance: 2,296; Referee: Ted Unkel (Florida) |

| June 17 | Portland Timbers (1-MLS) | 3–0 | Orlando City U-23 (4-PDL) | Portland, Oregon |
| 19:30 PT | Fernández 11', 35' (pen.); Peay 68' | Report | | Stadium: Providence Park; Attendance: 10,619; Referee: Juan Guzman (California) |

| June 18 | Richmond Kickers (3-USL Pro) | 2–3 | New England Revolution (1-MLS) | Richmond, Virginia |
| 19:00 ET | Davis IV 25'; William (yellow card) 40'; Delicâte 73' | Report | McCarthy 8'; Fagúndez (yellow card) 33'; Neumann 35'; Mullins 40' | Stadium: Richmond City Stadium; Referee: Daniel Fitzgerald (North Carolina) |

| June 18^{[A]} | Chicago Fire (1-MLS) | 2–1 | Pittsburgh Riverhounds (3-USL Pro) | Bridgeview, Illinois |
| 19:30 CT | Ward 22'; Magee 40' | Report | Marshall 42' | Stadium: Toyota Park; Attendance: 5,716; Referee: Alex Chilowicz (New Jersey) |

| June 18 | Sporting Kansas City (1-MLS) | 2–0 | Minnesota United FC (2-NASL) | Kansas City, Kansas |
| 19:30 CT | Saad 76'; Dywer (yellow card) 82'; Martinez 87' | Report | Jordan (yellow card) 29'; Cristiano (red card) 50' | Stadium: Sporting Park; Attendance: 15,307; Referee: Tyler Ploeger (Utah) |

| June 18 | Seattle Sounders FC (1-MLS) | 5–0 | PSA Elite (5-USASA) | Tukwila, Washington |
| 19:00 PT | Evans 23' (pen.); Scott 40'; Cooper 45', 56'; Okoli 85' | Report | | Stadium: Starfire Sports Complex; Attendance: 3,718; Referee: Baboucarr Jallow (Washington) |

| June 18 | Arizona United (3-USL Pro) | 1–2 | LA Galaxy (1-MLS) | Peoria, Arizona |
| 19:30 PT | Kassel 36'; Okafor (yellow card) 74' | Report; Report; Report | Rogers (yellow card) 20'; Zardes 51', 53'; Gargan (yellow card) 84' | Stadium: Peoria Sports Complex; Attendance: 4,018; Referee: Alejandro Mariscal (California) |

^{A} Game was suspended after 48:33 due to weather.

=== Fifth Round ===
A total of 16 teams will compete in the Fifth Round, all of which have progressed from the previous round. The lowest qualified side in this round are the Rochester Rhinos of the 3rd tier USL Professional Division.

| June 24 | Philadelphia Union (1-MLS) | 2–1 (a.e.t.) | New York Cosmos (2-NASL) | Chester, Pennsylvania |
| 19:00 ET | Carroll (yellow card) 35'; Cruz (yellow card) 29'; Fabinho (yellow card) 67'; Le Toux 57', 114' (pen.); Lahoud (red card) 118' | Report | Noselli 56' (yellow card) 111'; Maurer (yellow card) 113'; Ayoze (red card) 118'; Ockford (red card) 119' | Stadium: PPL Park; Attendance: 3,846; Referee: Ismail Elfath (Texas) |

| June 24 | Carolina RailHawks (2-NASL) | 1–0 (a.e.t.) | LA Galaxy (1-MLS) | Cary, North Carolina |
| 19:00 ET | Low (yellow card) 35'; Scott (yellow card) 44'; Jackson 105' | Report | DeLaGarza (yellow card) 45+3'; Sarvas (yellow card) 113' | Stadium: WakeMed Soccer Park; Attendance: 3,000; Referee: Fotis Bazakos (Minnesota) |

| June 24 | Sporting Kansas City (1-MLS) | 1–3 | Portland Timbers (1-MLS) | Kansas City, Kansas |
| 19:30 CT | Collin (yellow card) 60'; Saad 73' (pen.) | Report | Fernández 30', 68'; Johnson 57' (pen.); Alhassan (yellow card) 86' | Stadium: Sporting Park; Attendance: 11,138; Referee: Ricardo Salazar (California) |

| June 24 | Houston Dynamo (1-MLS) | 2–3 (a.e.t.) | FC Dallas (1-MLS) | Houston, Texas |
| 20:00 CT | Barnes 43' (pen.); Cummings 62'; Taylor (yellow card) 102' | Report | Castillo 35'; Escobar 59'; Akindele 99' | Stadium: BBVA Compass Stadium; Attendance: 2,083; Referee: Kevin Stott (California) |

| June 24 | Colorado Rapids (1-MLS) | 1–2 | Atlanta Silverbacks (2-NASL) | Commerce City, Colorado |
| 19:00 MT | Burch (red card) 62'; Powers 75' (pen.); Piermayr (yellow card) 90+9' | Report | Chavez 21', 57' (red card) 62'; Poku (red card) 62'; Carr (red card) 65'; Harlley (yellow card) 77'; Sandoval (yellow card) 83' | Stadium: Dick's Sporting Goods Park; Attendance: 1,654; Referee: Juan Guzman (California) |

| June 24 | Seattle Sounders FC (1-MLS) | 1–1 (a.e.t.) (4–1 p) | San Jose Earthquakes (1-MLS) | Tukwila, Washington |
| 19:30 PT | Cooper 26' | Report | Harris (yellow card) 19'; Lenhart 24', (yellow card) 34'; Francis (yellow card) 49'; Gordon (yellow card) 113' | Stadium: Starfire Sports Complex; Attendance: 4,023; Referee: Mark Kadlecik (North Carolina) |
| | Penalties |
| | Pineda (penalty scored); Pappa (penalty scored); Evans (penalty scored); Neagle (penalty scored) | | Stephenson (penalty scored); Gordon (penalty missed); Koval (penalty missed) |

| June 25 | New England Revolution (1-MLS) | 2–1 | Rochester Rhinos (3-USL Pro) | Providence, Rhode Island |
| 19:30 ET | Sène 11'; Rowe 33' | Report | Rolfe 55' | Stadium: Stevenson Field; Attendance: 1,570; Referee: Younes Marrakchi (Colorado) |

| June 25 | Chicago Fire (1-MLS) | 4–2 (a.e.t.) | Columbus Crew (1-MLS) | Bridgeview, Illinois |
| 19:30 CT | Ianni 34'; Anangonó 83', 108'; Amarikwa 92' | Report | Arrieta 55'; Añor 70' | Stadium: Toyota Park; Attendance: 5,124; Referee: Robert Sibiga (New York) |

=== Quarterfinals ===
The lowest ranked teams in the quarterfinals are the Atlanta Silverbacks and Carolina RailHawks, both of the 2nd tier North American Soccer League.

| July 8 | Philadelphia Union (1-MLS) | 2–0 | New England Revolution (1-MLS) | Chester, Pennsylvania |
| 19:00 ET | Casey 9'; Le Toux 48'; Okugo (yellow card) 57'; Williams (yellow card) 75'; Wheeler (yellow card) 76' | Report | McCarthy (yellow card) 16'; Soares (yellow card) 47' (yellow-red card) 90+4'; Gonçalves (yellow card) 71'; Nguyen (yellow card) 74' | Stadium: PPL Park; Attendance: 2,626; Referee: Fotis Bazakos (Minnesota) |

| July 9 | Atlanta Silverbacks (2-NASL) | 1–3 | Chicago Fire (1-MLS) | Atlanta, Georgia |
| 19:30 ET | McCaulay 54' | Report | Amarikwa 50'; Larentowicz 82' (pen.); Alex 85' | Stadium: Atlanta Silverbacks Park; Attendance: 5,327; Referee: Edvin Jurisevic (Nebraska) |

| July 9 | Carolina RailHawks (2-NASL) | 2–5 | FC Dallas (1-MLS) | Cary, North Carolina |
| 19:30 ET | Schilawski 9'; Martínez 37' (pen.) | Report | Pérez 23', 34', 90'; Castillo 44'; Díaz 89' | Stadium: WakeMed Soccer Park; Attendance: 4,169; Referee: Ricardo Salazar (California) |

| July 9 | Seattle Sounders FC (1-MLS) | 3–1 (a.e.t.) | Portland Timbers (1-MLS) | Tukwila, Washington |
| 19:30 PT | Alonso 69'; Cooper 110'; Pappa 115' | Report | Nagbe 90+3' | Stadium: Starfire Sports Complex; Attendance: 4,233; Referee: Chris Penso (Ohio) |

=== Semifinals ===
Of the teams that qualified for the semifinals of the 2014 Lamar Hunt U.S. Open Cup, all four come from Major League Soccer, the top tier of professional soccer in the United States.

| August 12 | FC Dallas (1-MLS) | 1–1 (a.e.t.) (3–4 p) | Philadelphia Union (1-MLS) | Frisco, Texas |
| 20:00 CT | Castillo 81' | Report | Okugo 47'; White (yellow card) 75'; Lahoud (yellow card) 102' | Stadium: Toyota Stadium; Attendance: 4,326; Referee: Mark Geiger (New Jersey) |
| | Penalties |
| | Michel (penalty scored); Akindele (penalty scored); Pérez (penalty missed); Loyd (penalty scored); Ulloa (penalty missed) | | (penalty scored) Williams; (penalty scored) Nogueira; (penalty scored) Maidana; (penalty scored) Edu |

| August 13 | Seattle Sounders FC (1-MLS) | 6–0 | Chicago Fire (1-MLS) | Tukwila, Washington |
| 19:30 PT | Barrett 6'; Rose 33', 58'; Neagle (yellow card) 73'; Martins 79'; Cooper 83', 84' | Report | Cocis (yellow card) 17'; Palmer (yellow card) 55'; Soumaré (yellow card) 70'; Segares (yellow card) 82' | Stadium: Starfire Sports Complex; Attendance: 4,361; Referee: Jair Marrufo (Texas) |

=== Final ===
| September 16 | Philadelphia Union (1-MLS) | 1–3 (a.e.t.) | Seattle Sounders FC (1-MLS) | Chester, Pennsylvania |
| 19:30 ET | Edu 38' | Report | Barrett 47'; Dempsey 101'; Martins 114' | Stadium: PPL Park; Attendance: 15,256; Referee: Armando Villarreal (Texas) |

== Top Goalscorers ==
| Rank | Scorer | Club | Goals |
|---|---|---|---|
| 1 | (United States) Kenny Cooper | Seattle Sounders FC | 6 |
| 2 | (United States) Blake Smith | Indy Eleven | 4 |
| 2 | (Colombia) Fabián Castillo | FC Dallas | 4 |
| 2 | (Argentina) Gastón Fernández | Portland Timbers | 4 |
| 5 | (El Salvador) Junior Burgos | Atlanta Silverbacks | 3 |
| 5 | (United States) Jaime Chavez | Atlanta Silverbacks | 3 |
| 5 | (Cuba) Heviel Cordovés | Charleston Battery | 3 |
| 5 | (Jamaica) Deshorn Brown | Colorado Rapids | 3 |
| 5 | (Panama) Blas Pérez | FC Dallas | 3 |
| 5 | (Mexico) Alberto Rodriguez | NTX Rayados | 3 |
| 5 | (France) Sébastien Le Toux | Philadelphia Union | 3 |
| 5 | (United States) George Davis | Richmond Kickers | 3 |
| 5 | (Saint Kitts and Nevis) Tishan Hanley | Richmond Kickers | 3 |
| 5 | (United States) Colin Rolfe | Rochester Rhinos | 3 |
| 5 | (United States) Will Daniels | Western Mass Pioneers | 3 |
