= 2016 Arizona United SC season =

Arizona United SC
2016 season
- Owners: (United States) Kyle Eng (United States) Brett M. Johnson (United States) Diplo (United States) Pete Wentz & others
- Manager: (Canada) Frank Yallop
- Stadium: Peoria Sports Complex
- USL: 13th, Western Conference
- USL Playoffs: Did not qualify
- U.S. Open Cup: 3rd round
- Top goalscorer: Long Tan (10)
- Highest home attendance: 3,374 (April 30 v. Portland)
- Lowest home attendance: 753 (August 31 v. LA Galaxy II)
- Average home league attendance: League: 1,470; All: 1,487
Home colors	Away colors

The 2016 Arizona United SC season was the club's third season of United Soccer League play.

== Friendlies ==
All times from this point are on Mountain Standard Time (UTC−07:00)

February 20, 2016 2016 Desert Diamond Cup	Arizona United SC	0–0	Swope Park Rangers	Tucson, Arizona
4:30pm	Gavin (yellow card) 17'; Johnson (yellow card) 73'	Report	Kelly (yellow card) 28'; Diaw (yellow card) 65'	Stadium: Kino Sports Complex; North Grandstand; Referee: Robi Hullner

February 24, 2016 2016 Desert Diamond Cup	FC Tucson	1–3	Arizona United SC	Tucson, Arizona
3:30pm	Bevans 50'	Report	Bardsley 38'; Cortez 65', 67'	Stadium: Kino Sports Complex; North Grandstand
Note: Played in three 30-minute periods.

February 27, 2016 2016 Desert Diamond Cup	Colorado Rapids	3–0	Arizona United SC	Tucson, Arizona
6:30pm	Ringhof 17' (o.g.); Doyle 31'; Gashi 63'	Report		Stadium: Kino Sports Complex; North Grandstand; Referee: Ismail Elfath

March 4, 2016 Preseason	Arizona United SC	0–4	Indy Eleven	Casa Grande, Arizona
3:00pm		Report; Report	Wojcik 55', 71', 80'; Lacroix 69'	Stadium: Grande Sports Academy

March 10, 2016 Preseason	Arizona United SC	0–0	Orange County Blues	Casa Grande, Arizona
2:00pm		Report		Stadium: Grande Sports Academy

March 15, 2016 Preseason	Grand Canyon University	1–2	Arizona United SC	Phoenix, Arizona
9:30am	? 83' (pen.)	Report	Cascio 17'; Skácel 59'	Stadium: GCU Soccer Field

April 17, 2016 Hybrid Friendly	Arizona United SC (United States)	1–2	Mexico U-20	Peoria, Arizona
2:00pm	Tan 35' (pen.)		Ibarra 19'; González 21'	Stadium: Peoria Sports Complex

== USL ==
All times from this point on Mountain Standard Time (UTC−07:00)

=== Results summary ===
Overall								Home						Away					
Pld	W	D	L	GF	GA	GD	Pts	W	D	L	GF	GA	GD	W	D	L	GF	GA	GD
30	9	7	14	40	46	−6	34	5	4	6	20	21	−1	4	3	8	20	25	−5

Source: Match reports

Round	1	2	3	4	5	6	7	8	9	10	11	12	13	14	15	16	17	18	19	20	21	22	23	24	25	26	27	28	29	30
Stadium	A	A	A	A	A	H	H	A	H	A	H	H	A	H	A	H	H	A	H	H	A	H	A	A	H	H	A	H	H	A
Result	L	W	L	L	W	D	D	D	L	L	W	W	D	D	L	D	L	W	L	W	W	W	L	L	L	L	D	L	W	L

Updated to match(es) played on September 24, 2016. Source: Match reports
A = Away; H = Home; W = Win; D = Draw; L = Loss

=== League results ===
March 26, 2016 1	LA Galaxy II	2–0	Arizona United SC	Carson, California
7:30pm	Lassiter 10' (pen.), 30'; McBean (yellow card) 47'; Garcia (yellow card) 50'; Sorto (red card) 62'	Report; Report	Granger (yellow card) 60'; Costa (yellow card) 82'	Stadium: StubHub Center; Attendance: 2,715; Referee: Alex Chilowicz

March 30, 2016 2	Seattle Sounders 2	0–2	Arizona United SC	Tukwila, Washington
7:30pm	O'Ojong (yellow card) 78'; Mathers (yellow card) 89'	Report; Report	Bardsley 16'; Cortez 24'; Granger (yellow card) 42'; Antúnez (yellow card) 49'; Gavin (yellow card) 53'; Costa (yellow card) 90+'; Cuevas (yellow card) 90+'	Stadium: Starfire Sports Complex; Referee: Levi Rippy

April 2, 2016 3	Sacramento Republic FC	1–0	Arizona United SC	Sacramento, California
7:30pm	Christian (yellow card) 45+'; Iwasa 84'; Guzman (yellow card) 85'	Report; Report		Stadium: Bonney Field; Attendance: 11,569; Referee: Joseph Dickerson

April 9, 2016 4	Colorado Springs Switchbacks	2–0	Arizona United SC	Colorado Springs, Colorado
1:30pm	Maybin 22' (yellow card) 42'; Burt (yellow card) 45'; Argueta (yellow card) 50'; González (yellow card) 55'; Phillips (yellow card) 59'; Seth 62'; Greer (yellow card) 89'	Report; Report	Poltronieri (yellow card) 40'	Stadium: Switchbacks Stadium; Attendance: 2,212; Referee: Leland Grant

April 15, 2016 5	Real Monarchs	0–1	Arizona United SC	Orem, Utah
7:00pm	Rolfe (yellow card) 24'; Amankona (yellow card) 48'; Copeland (yellow card) 76'; Frater (yellow card) 90+'	Report; Report	Rooney (yellow card) 12'; Blackwood 72'	Stadium: Clyde Field; Referee: Mitch Lillywhite

April 30, 2016 6	Arizona United SC	1–1	Portland Timbers 2	Peoria, Arizona
7:30pm	Garza 80'; Costa (yellow card) 81'	Report; Report	Arboleda 1'; Gallagher (yellow card) 62'	Stadium: Peoria Sports Complex; Attendance: 3,374; Referee: Michael Lavergne

May 7, 2016 7	Arizona United SC	0–0	Oklahoma City Energy FC	Peoria, Arizona
7:30pm	Rooney (yellow card) 73'; Woszczynski (yellow card) 90+'	Report; Report	König (yellow card) 55'; Harris (yellow card) 86'; Thomas (yellow card) 90+'; Rideout (yellow card) 90+'	Stadium: Peoria Sports Complex; Attendance: 3,108; Referee: Malik Badawi

May 14, 2016 8	Orange County Blues	1–1	Arizona United SC	Irvine, California
7:00pm	Popara (yellow card) 30'; McCracken (yellow card) 47'; Caesar (yellow card) 62'; Baccielo 78'	Report	Timm (yellow card) 51'; Rooney 59'	Stadium: Anteater Stadium; Attendance: 885; Referee: Ramy Touchan

May 21, 2016 9	Arizona United SC	1–3	Colorado Springs Switchbacks	Peoria, Arizona
7:30pm	Granger (yellow card) 9'; Ringhof 16' (yellow card) 79'; Rooney (yellow card) 87'	Report	Suggs 7'; González 32'; Maybin (yellow card) 52'; Robinson 76' (red card) 86'	Stadium: Peoria Sports Complex; Attendance: 1,650; Referee: Luis Guardia

May 28, 2016 10	LA Galaxy II	4–1	Arizona United SC	Carson, California
7:30pm	Fujii 20', 33'; McBean 23', 85'; Zubak (yellow card) 29'; Villarreal (yellow card) 57'; Mendiola (yellow card) 76'	Report; Report	Kelly (yellow card) 45+'; Tan 75' (pen.); Garza (yellow card) 84'	Stadium: StubHub Center Track and Field Stadium; Referee: Malik Badawi

June 11, 2016 11	Arizona United SC	2–0	Orange County Blues	Peoria, Arizona
7:30pm	Tan (yellow card) 8'; Cortez 41'; Gavin (yellow card) 81'; Garza 90+'	Report	McCracken (yellow card) 60'; Ajeakwa (red card) 65'	Stadium: Peoria Sports Complex; Attendance: 1,707; Referee: Cuauhtemoc Delgadillo

June 18, 2016 12	Arizona United SC	2–1	Saint Louis FC	Peoria, Arizona
7:30pm	Blackwood 10'; Tan 58'	Report; Report	Hardware (yellow card) 19'; Bushue (yellow card) 79'; Ambersley (yellow card) 80'; Roberts 90+'	Stadium: Peoria Sports Complex; Attendance: 1,002; Referee: Chipalo Street

June 22, 2016 13	Rio Grande Valley Toros	1–1	Arizona United SC	Edinburg, Texas
7:30pm	Bird 21'	Report	Blackwood 63'	Stadium: UTRGV Soccer Stadium; Attendance: 1,656; Referee: Michael Lavergne

June 25, 2016 14	Arizona United SC	1–1	Sacramento Republic FC	Peoria, Arizona
7:30pm	Blackwood 54'; Rooney (yellow card) 76'; Kelly (yellow card) 90'	Report; Report	Alvarez (yellow card) 66'; Kiffe (yellow card) 90'; Pridham 90+'	Stadium: Peoria Sports Complex; Attendance: 1,145; Referee: Alejandro Mariscal

July 1, 2016 15	Tulsa Roughnecks FC	3–2	Arizona United SC	Tulsa, Oklahoma
7:30pm	Ochoa 7'; Taylor 14'; Mata 40'; Peters (red card) 87'		Tan 28', 57'; West (yellow card) 68'	Stadium: ONEOK Field; Attendance: 3,323; Referee: Jon Freemon

July 9, 2016 16	Arizona United SC	1–1	Swope Park Rangers	Peoria, Arizona
7:30pm	Tan 17' (pen.); West (yellow card) 35'; Rooney (yellow card) 53'; Silva (red card) 63'; Garza (yellow card) 85'	Report; Report	Tyrpak 31' (pen.); Didic (yellow card) 49'; Ayrton (red card) 63'; Duke (yellow card) 76'; Pasher (yellow card) 82'; Ballo (yellow card) 90+'	Stadium: Peoria Sports Complex; Attendance: 1,012; Referee: Daniel Radford

July 16, 2016 17	Arizona United SC	2–3	Seattle Sounders 2	Peoria, Arizona
7:30pm	Cortez 29'; Tan 36'; Uzo (yellow card) 88'; Ringhof (yellow card) 90+'; Stagmiller (yellow card) 90+'	Report; Report	Jones 25', 56'; Schweitzer 45' (yellow card) 69'	Stadium: Peoria Sports Complex; Attendance: 1,325; Referee: Marco Vega

July 22, 2016 18	Real Monarchs	0–3	Arizona United SC	Orem, Utah
6:00pm	Schuler (yellow card) 45+'; Acosta (yellow card) 57'	Report; Report	Antúnez (yellow card) 21'; Rooney (yellow card) 24'; Cortez 49'; Blackwood 57'; Tan 86' (pen.)	Stadium: Clyde Field; Referee: Younes Marrakchi

July 30, 2016 19	Arizona United SC	1–2	Tulsa Roughnecks FC	Peoria, Arizona
7:30pm	Granger (yellow card) 35'; Schafer 61' (o.g.); Rooney (yellow card) 90'	Report; Report	Mata 3', 90+'; Manhebo (yellow card) 31'; Ballew (yellow card) 84'	Stadium: Peoria Sports Complex; Attendance: 1,217; Referee: Robi Hullner

August 3, 2016 20	Arizona United SC	3–2	Vancouver Whitecaps 2	Peoria, Arizona
7:30pm	Granger (yellow card) 41'; Rooney 65', 78'; Cortez 90+'	Report; Report	Wynne (yellow card) 27'; Haber 45+'; Safiu 54' (yellow card) 70'	Stadium: Peoria Sports Complex; Attendance: 803; Referee: Reyna Fonseca

August 7, 2016 21	Orange County Blues	1–3	Arizona United SC	Irvine, California
7:00pm	Karapetyan 28'; Pluntke (yellow card) 56'; Mirković (yellow card) 88'	Report; Report	Rooney (yellow card) 22' (red card) 82'; Tan 42'; Cortez 54'; Blackwood 86'	Stadium: Anteater Stadium; Attendance: 580; Referee: Alejandro Mariscal

August 13, 2016 22	Arizona United SC	1–0	San Antonio FC	Peoria, Arizona
7:30pm	Blackwood 73'; Silva (yellow card) 85'; Gavin (yellow card) 90+'	Report; Report	Morgan (yellow card) 7'; Salazar (yellow card) 24'; Elizondo (yellow card) 75'	Stadium: Peoria Sports Complex; Attendance: 1,362; Referee: Ramy Touchan

August 17, 2016 23	San Antonio FC	3–2	Arizona United SC	San Antonio, Texas
7:30pm	Tayou (yellow card) 26' (goal) 43'; Alvarez 32'; Elizondo (yellow card) 45+' (goal) 56'; Bradnock-Brennan (yellow card) 86'	Report; Report	West (yellow card) 20'; Rooney 45+', 87' (pen.)	Stadium: Toyota Field; Attendance: 4,326; Referee: Marco Vega

August 21, 2016 24	Vancouver Whitecaps 2	3–1	Arizona United SC	Langley Township, British Columbia
3:00pm	McKendry (yellow card) 19'; Chung (yellow card) 33'; Greig (yellow card) 61' de Wit (yellow card) 71'; Sanner 84', 87', 90+'	Report; Report	Blackwood 17'; Gavin (yellow card) 37' (red card) 59'	Stadium: McLeod Stadium; Attendance: 2,107

August 27, 2016 25	Arizona United SC	0–1	Real Monarchs	Peoria, Arizona
7:30pm	Silva (red card) 52'	Report	Sundly (yellow card) 1'; Orellana 24'; Kavita (yellow card) 65'; Amankona (yellow card) 90+'; Ramírez (yellow card) 90+'	Stadium: Peoria Sports Complex; Attendance: 1,384; Referee: Robi Hullner

August 31, 2016 26	Arizona United SC	1–2	LA Galaxy II	Peoria, Arizona
7:30pm	Rooney 28'	Report; Report	Lassiter 16'; Amaya 73'	Stadium: Peoria Sports Complex; Attendance: 753; Referee: Brandon Marshall

September 4, 2016 27	San Antonio FC	1–1	Arizona United SC	San Antonio, Texas
5:00pm	Alvarez 43'; Gunderson (yellow card) 56'; Cardone (yellow card) 79'	Report; Report	Tan 9' (yellow card) 72'; Ringhof (yellow card) 75'	Stadium: Toyota Field; Attendance: 5,569; Referee: Patrick Muana

September 13, 2016 28	Arizona United SC	1–2	Portland Timbers 2	Peoria, Arizona
7:30pm	Cascio 22'; Granger (yellow card) 29'; Gavin (yellow card) 59'; Rooney (yellow card) 64'	Report	Williams 59'; Lewis (yellow card) 61'; Brett 90+'; McIntosh (yellow card) 90+'	Stadium: Peoria Sports Complex; Attendance: 964; Referee: Robi Hullner

September 17, 2016 29	Arizona United SC	3–2	Real Monarchs	Peoria, Arizona
7:30pm	Rooney 13'; Kelly 64'; Tan 75'	Report; Report	Báez 45' (yellow card) 45+'; Ramírez 60'; Leal (yellow card) 85'	Stadium: Peoria Sports Complex; Attendance: 1,239; Referee: Paul Nothman

September 24, 2016 30	Portland Timbers 2	3–2	Arizona United SC	Portland, Oregon
7:00pm	Clarke (yellow card) 19'; Williams 28'; Bijev 35', 45+'	Report	Rooney 21' (yellow card) 66'; Cortez 72'; Poltronieri (yellow card) 78'	Stadium: Merlo Field; Attendance: 3,602; Referee: Chipalo Street

=== Western Conference standings ===
Pos	Team	Pld	W	D	L	GF	GA	GD	Pts
11	Real Monarchs	30	10	6	14	31	41	−10	36
12	Seattle Sounders 2	30	9	8	13	35	50	−15	35
13	Arizona United	30	9	7	14	40	46	−6	34
14	Saint Louis FC	30	8	10	12	42	44	−2	34
15	Tulsa Roughnecks	30	5	4	21	25	64	−39	19

Source: 2016 USL Standings
Rules for classification: 1) total wins; 2) total goal differential; 3) total goals scored; 4) points earned against top four Conference finishers; 5) disciplinary points; 6) coin toss or drawing of lots

== U.S. Open Cup ==
May 18, 2016 Second round	FC Tucson	0–5	Arizona United SC	Tucson, Arizona
7:30pm	Papa (yellow card) 27'; Keith (yellow card) 43'	Report	Rooney 28'; Tan 33', 68'; Bardsley (yellow card) 41' (red card) 54' (goal) 45+'; Blackwood 48'; Woszczynski (yellow card) 77'	Stadium: Kino North Stadium

June 1, 2016 Third round	Arizona United SC	0–3	Colorado Springs Switchbacks	Peoria, Arizona
7:30pm	Rooney (yellow card) 16'; Gavin (yellow card) 44'; Blackwood (yellow card) 49'	Report; Report	Vercollone 39', 83' (yellow card) 61'; King 59'; Ibeagha (yellow card) 64'	Stadium: Peoria Sports Complex; Attendance: 1,750

== Statistics ==
#	Pos.	Name	GP	GS	Min.	Goals	Assists	A yellow rectangle, denoting the yellow penalty card shown to a player being cautioned	A red rectangle, denoting the red penalty card shown to a player being sent off
29	FW	(China) Long Tan	30		2,149	10	6	2	0
17	FW	(England) Tyler Blackwood	26		2,043	8	1	0	0
10	MF	(England) Luke Rooney	24		1,972	8	5	10	1
9	FW	(United States) Chris Cortez	26		1,767	7	4	1	0
11	MF	(United States) Sam Garza	23		638	2	0	2	0
21	DF	(Germany) Julian Ringhof	28		2,316	1	0	4	0
24	DF	(United States) Peter Kelly	20		1,291	1	2	2	0
14	MF	(United States) Tony Cascio	22		959	1	3	0	0
7	MF	(United States) Gibson Bardsley	9		393	1	0	0	0
6	MF	(South Africa) Miguel Timm	15		1,034	0	2	1	0
8	MF	(United States) Blair Gavin	28		2,427	0	1	6	1
4	DF	(United States) Brock Granger	23		1,489	0	1	6	0
5	DF	(United States) Daniel Antúnez	19		1,163	0	1	2	0
31	DF	(United States) Adam West	12		1,033	0	1	3	0
26	DF	(England) Peter Ramage	11		945	0	1	0	0
2	DF	(Nigeria) Uchenna Uzo	23		1,583	0	0	1	0
3	DF	(United States) Nick Costa	14		958	0	0	3	0
35	MF	(Brazil) Matheus Silva	16		947	0	0	0	1
11	MF	(Costa Rica) Brandon Poltronieri	13		547	0	0	1	0
25	MF	(United States) Duncan McCormick	11		527	0	0	0	0
33	DF	(Cyprus) Tom Williams	5		352	0	0	0	0
12	MF	(United States) Christian Silva	9		198	0	0	1	1
16	MF	(United States) Freddy Ruiz	3		48	0	0	0	0
19	FW	(United States) Minh Vu	2		25	0	0	0	0
10	MF	(United States) Jose Cuevas	3		13	0	0	0	0

=== Goalkeepers ===
#	Name	GP	GS	Min.	SV	GA	GAA	SO	A yellow rectangle, denoting the yellow penalty card shown to a player being cautioned	A red rectangle, denoting the red penalty card shown to a player being sent off
1	(United States) Carl Woszczynski	24	24	2,160	79	37	1.542	5	0	0
13	(United States) Jordan Stagmiller	6	6	540	17	9	1.500	1	1	0

== Transfers ==
=== Loan in ===
Start date	End date	Position	No.	Player	From club
May 13, 2016	End of Season	Midfielder	35	(Brazil) Matheus Silva	San Jose Earthquakes

=== Loan out ===
Start date	End date	Position	No.	Player	To club
April 8, 2016	End of Season	Midfielder	10	(United States) Jose Cuevas	Oklahoma City Energy FC

== See also ==
- 2016 in American soccer
- 2016 USL season
- Arizona United SC
