= Maurice Pluntke =

German footballer

Personal information
- Date of birth: 23 January 1994 (age 32)
- Place of birth: Mönchengladbach, Germany
- Height: 1.86 m (6 ft 1 in)
- Positions: Centre-back; defensive midfielder

Team information
- Current team: Holzheimer SG

Youth career
- –2012: SC Rheindahlen
- 2002–2012: Borussia Mönchengladbach

Senior career*
Years	Team	Apps	(Gls)
2012–2014	Borussia Mönchengladbach II	5	(0)
2014–2015	Fortuna Düsseldorf	1	(0)
2014–2015	Fortuna Düsseldorf II	28	(0)
2016–2017	Orange County SC	28	(0)
2017–2018	Alemannia Aachen	38	(1)
2018–2020	Wacker Nordhausen	32	(2)
2020–2021	Kickers Offenbach	1	(0)
2021–2022	1. FC Bocholt	17	(2)
2022–2024	Wegberg-Beeck	43	(0)
2024–	Holzheimer SG	0	(0)

International career
2009	Germany U15	1	(0)
2009–2010	Germany U16	4	(0)
2010	Germany U17	3	(0)
2012	Germany U18	1	(0)
- * Club domestic league appearances and goals as of 04:08, 4 July 2024 (UTC)

Maurice Pluntke (born 23 January 1994) is a German footballer who plays as a centre-back or defensive midfielder for Holzheimer SG.

== Career ==
Pluntke began his career at SC Rheindahlen and joined the youth team at Borussia Mönchengladbach in 2002. He went through all youth teams and promoted to the reserve team for the 2013–14 season. On 17 May 2014, he made his debut in a 2–2 draw against Sportfreunde Lotte in Regionalliga West.

Pluntke moved to Fortuna Düsseldorf for the 2014–15 season, whose second team also played in the Regionalliga West. On 25 April 2015, he was in the first team's squad for the first time in a league game against 1860 Munich. On 8 May 2015, he made his debut in the 2–0 defeat in a home game against VfR Aalen in the 2. Bundesliga.

In mid-January 2016, Pluntke terminated his contract in Düsseldorf, and joined American third-tier side Orange County SC in Irvine, California in April 2016.

In mid-January 2017 Pluntke returned to Germany and joined the Regionalliga team Alemannia Aachen. For the 2018–19 season he moved to FSV Wacker 90 Nordhausen. Pluntke joined Kickers Offenbach in January 2020, signing a deal until June 2021.
