= Nick Costa =

American professional soccer player

Personal information
- Full name: Nicholas Costa
- Date of birth: May 28, 1991 (age 35)
- Place of birth: Carle Place, New York, United States
- Height: 1.73 m (5 ft 8 in)
- Position: Defender

Team information
- Current team: New York Cosmos B

College career
| Years | Team | Apps | (Gls) |
| 2010–2013 | Adelphi Panthers | 60 | (4) |

Senior career*
| Years | Team | Apps | (Gls) |
| 2015 | New York Cosmos B | 12 | (0) |
| 2016 | Arizona United | 14 | (0) |
| 2018– | New York Cosmos B | 1 | (0) |
- * Club domestic league appearances and goals as of August 14, 2018

Nicholas Costa (born May 28, 1991) is an American professional soccer player who currently plays for New York Cosmos B in the National Premier Soccer League.

== Career ==
=== College & Semi Professional ===
Costa played four years of college soccer at the Adelphi University between 2010 and 2013. Costa was a standout at Adelphi University making his collegiate debut against Division I Syracuse University. Costa was named Most Valuable Player his Junior Year in 2011, Adelphi's last year as a Division I program. His senior year Costa competed in the Division II North East 10 Conference. Costa finished his Senior year leading the North East 10 in assists with a total of 9 and tallying 2 goals. Costa was not entered into the MLS draft.

Following his senior year and graduating from Adelphi University, Costa played with New York Cosmos B in the NPSL during their 2015 season. Costa made a total of 12 appearances during the NY Cosmos B inaugural season.

=== Professional ===
Following a year with New York Cosmos B, Costa signed his professional contract with United Soccer League side Arizona United on March 23, 2016. Costa made his professional debut against Los Angeles Galaxy 2. He would go on and suffer yet again another injury to his shoulder, re-dislocating his shoulder forcing him in and out of the starting line up for the remainder season.
