= Brandon Swartzendruber =

American soccer player (born 1985)

Personal information
- Full name: Brandon Swartzendruber
- Date of birth: April 2, 1985 (age 41)
- Place of birth: Grand Junction, Colorado, United States
- Height: 6 ft 2 in (1.88 m)
- Position: Forward

Team information
- Current team: Thunder Bay Chill

Youth career
- 2003–2004: Chandler-Gilbert Coyotes
- 2005–2006: Midwestern State Mustangs

Senior career*
Years	Team	Apps	(Gls)
2005	Okanagan Challenge	16	(11)
2007–2008	Thunder Bay Chill	32	(29)
2009	Harrisburg City Islanders	18	(4)
2010–2011	Thunder Bay Chill	32	(28)
2013	Dayton Dutch Lions	24	(7)
2014	Arizona United	10	(2)
2015	Thunder Bay Chill	14	(9)
2017	Thunder Bay Chill	12	(4)
- * Club domestic league appearances and goals as of 2015

Brandon Swarzendruber (born April 2, 1985) is an American soccer player.

== Career ==
Swartzendruber turned professional when he signed with Harrisburg City Islanders of the USL Second Division in 2009. He made his professional debut on April 18, 2009, in a 2–2 tie with Richmond Kickers, and scored his first professional goal on April 25, 2009, in a 3–1 win over the Western Mass Pioneers. He went on to score 4 goals in 18 appearances for Harrisburg—an impressive statistic when only playing 540 minutes all season. Swartzendruber also scored the lone goal for Harrisburg in a 3-1 friendly against Crystal Palace FC from the English Championship.

Swartzendruber returned to play for Thunder Bay Chill in the USL Premier Development League in 2010. He also played for the team in 2015 and 2017.

== Honors ==
=== Thunder Bay Chill ===
- USL Premier Development League Champions (1): 2008
