= Matt Kassel =

American soccer player (born 1989)

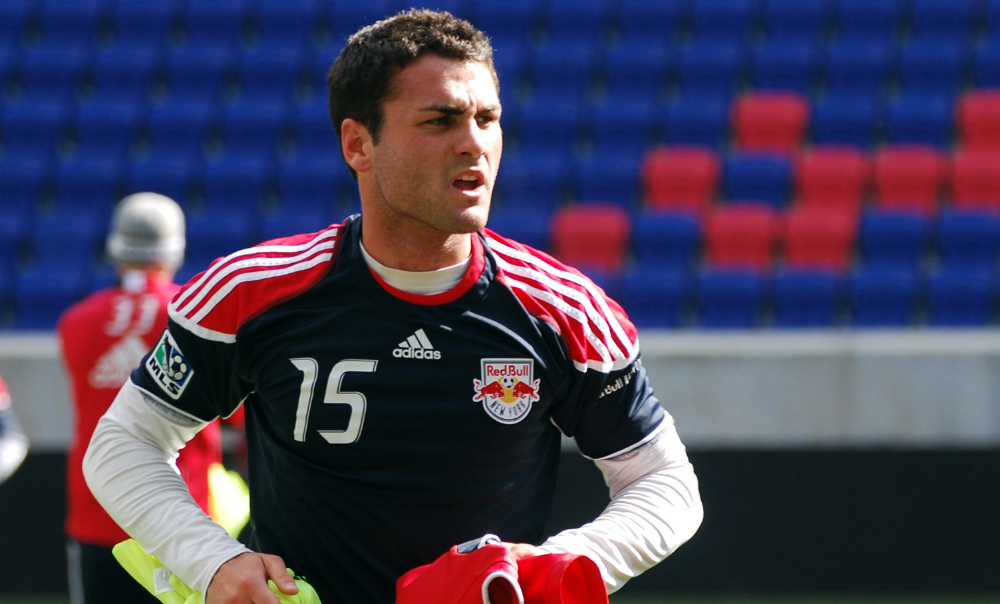

Personal information
- Full name: Matthew Timothy Kassel
- Date of birth: October 30, 1989 (age 37)
- Place of birth: Bridgewater Township, New Jersey, U.S.
- Height: 5 ft 10 in (1.78 m)
- Position: Midfielder

Youth career
- 2006–2008: New York Red Bulls

College career
Years	Team	Apps	(Gls)
2008–2010	Maryland Terrapins		

Senior career*
Years	Team	Apps	(Gls)
2010	New York Red Bulls NPSL		
2011	New York Red Bulls	2	(0)
2012	Pittsburgh Riverhounds	18	(6)
2013	Philadelphia Union	5	(0)
2014	Arizona United	26	(2)

International career
2007	United States U18	3	(0)
- * Club domestic league appearances and goals as of September 11, 2014

Matthew Timothy Kassel (born October 30, 1989) is an American retired soccer player and current color commentator for Bethlehem Steel FC in the USL.

== Career ==
=== College and amateur ===
Kassel attended Bridgewater-Raritan High School. He began his career with New York Red Bulls' youth academy, and was heavily recruited going into college, being ranked as the ninth best high school recruit in the nation by the magazine ESPN RISE. After receiving interest from New York Red Bulls Kassel decided to attend the University of Maryland. In his first year at Maryland Kassel helped his side capture the 2008 Division I Men's College Cup.

In January 2009, he declined to sign a contract from New York Red Bulls. Instead, he decided to stay with the University of Maryland soccer team. In his three years at the University of Maryland Kassell appeared in 68 matches and scored 11 goals and recorded 24 assists. During his time in college he remained with the New York Red Bulls Academy and was a member of the New York Red Bull NPSL squad.

=== Professional ===
In January 2011 Kassel signed with New York Red Bulls, becoming the third Home Grown player to join the senior roster. He made his MLS debut on 28 May 2011, in a 1–1 tie with Vancouver Whitecaps FC. On June 28, 2011, Kassel started his first match for New York playing the full 90 in a 2–1 victory over FC New York in the US Open Cup.

Kassel was waived by New York on February 17, 2012. In his first season with the Pittsburgh Riverhounds after signing with the team in April 2012, he scored 6 goals in 18 games and earned 2nd Team USL PRO All-League honors.

After spending Spring Training as a trialist, Kassel signed with the Philadelphia Union on March 5, 2013.

Kassel was released by Philadelphia before the start of their 2014 season and later signed with USL Pro's Arizona United.

=== International ===
Kassel has played for the United States at several youth team levels, including Under 15, Under 18 and Under 20. He played in all three games at the Under 18 Lisbon Tournament in May 2007. In April 2008, Kassel was called up for the Under 20 team for a week-long training camp in England and three games against Premier League reserve teams.

=== Broadcasting ===
After a four-year professional career, Kassel retired from playing. Since 2016, Kassel has been brought on as the color commentator for the newly formed Bethlehem Steel FC; USL affiliate of his former club, Philadelphia Union.

== Career statistics ==
Appearances and goals by club, season and competition
Club	Season	League			U.S. Open Cup		Other		Total	
Club	Season	Division	Apps	Goals	Apps	Goals	Apps	Goals	Apps	Goals
New York Red Bulls	2011	Major League Soccer	2	0	2	0	0	0	4	0
Pittsburgh Riverhounds	2012	USL Pro	18	6	0	0	0	0	18	6
Philadelphia Union	2013	Major League Soccer	5	0	0	0	0	0	5	0
Arizona United SC	2014	USL Pro	26	2	2	1	0	0	28	3
Career total			51	8	4	1	0	0	55	9

== Honors ==
=== University of Maryland ===
- NCAA Men's Division I Soccer Championship (1): 2008

=== Individual ===
- USL Pro - 2nd Team All-League (1): 2012
