= Joey Dillon =

American soccer player (born 1992)

Personal information
- Full name: Joseph Dillon
- Date of birth: January 25, 1992 (age 34)
- Place of birth: Rochester Hills, Michigan, United States
- Height: 1.83 m (6 ft 0 in)
- Position: Defensive midfielder

Youth career
- 2008–2010: Vardar SC Freiburg

College career
Years	Team	Apps	(Gls)
2010–2013	Georgetown Hoyas	86	(1)

Senior career*
Years	Team	Apps	(Gls)
2011	Michigan Bucks	9	(0)
2012	Detroit City FC	3	(0)
2012–2013	Michigan Bucks	5	(0)
2014	Real Salt Lake	0	(0)
2014–2015	Arizona United	46	(0)
- * Club domestic league appearances and goals as of September 8, 2015

Joseph Dillon (born January 25, 1992) is an American soccer player.

== Career ==
=== College and amateur ===
Dillon played four years of college soccer at Georgetown University between 2010 and 2013. While at college, Dillon also appeared for USL PDL club Michigan Bucks and NPSL club Detroit City FC.

=== Professional career ===
Dillon was drafted 53rd overall by Real Salt Lake in the 2014 MLS SuperDraft. Dillon was signed by the club on March 1, 2014.

Dillon signed with USL Pro club Arizona United in April 2014.
