= Tyler Blackwood =

English footballer (born 1991)

Personal information
- Date of birth: 24 July 1991 (age 35)
- Place of birth: London, England
- Height: 1.88 m (6 ft 2 in)
- Positions: Forward; winger

Team information
- Current team: Tottenham Hotspur

Youth career
- 2006–2008: Northampton Town
- 2008–2010: Barnet

College career
Years	Team	Apps	(Gls)
2011–2013	Tampa Spartans	33	(24)
2014	South Florida Bulls	10	(4)

Senior career*
Years	Team	Apps	(Gls)
2013	Orlando City U-23	14	(15)
2015–2016	Queens Park Rangers	1	(0)
2015	→ Newport County (loan)	3	(1)
2016	Arizona United	26	(8)
2017	Sacramento Republic	34	(6)
2018	Swope Park Rangers	32	(7)
2019	Sacramento Republic	11	(1)
2019–2020	Saint Louis FC	27	(12)
2021	Oakland Roots	4	(0)
2023–2025	Enfield Town	0	(0)
- * Club domestic league appearances and goals as of 13:25, 3 October 2023 (UTC)

Tyler Blackwood (born 24 July 1991) is an English former professional footballer who played as a striker. He is also the author of the children's book ''Clive the Croc Who Lost His Chomp'', published in 2017.

== Club career ==
=== Youth and college ===
Tyler Blackwood was born in London and attended Highlands School. He was a former Northampton Town academy player, scored 11 goals in 20 appearance for the U-16 team before moved to the United States to play college soccer at the University of Tampa. Blackwood played three seasons for the Spartans, scoring 24 goals and 8 assists in his 33 appearances. He did not see any action in his first collegiate season. Blackwood also received both the player of the year and offensive player of the year award two years running, breaking several records at the university.

Whilst at the University Of Tampa, Blackwood also took part in the summer PDL league for Orlando City U-23. He went on to score 15 goals in 14 games for the Lions, finishing #1 in the nation in goals.

For his final year of collegiate eligibility Blackwood transferred to nearby NCAA Division I school University of South Florida. Blackwood played 18 games for the Bulls, scoring 4 goals and making 3 assists.

Blackwood was overlooked for the 2015 MLS SuperDraft, and returned to England and earned a trial at Queens Park Rangers. He successfully impressed during his trial, and signed his first professional deal with QPR.

=== Queens Park Rangers ===
After impressing during a trial, on 10 July 2015 Blackwood signed a one-year deal starting from 1 August 2015 with Queens Park Rangers. Blackwood scored six goals in total during his first spell with Rangers at the tail end of the previous 2014–15 season, before signing for the club, including a match-winning brace for the Under-21s at Crewe Alexandra and another double in a first team friendly with Norwich City.

On 12 August 2015 Blackwood made his professional debut in Queens Park Rangers 0–3 win over Yeovil Town in the first round of the 2015–16 Football League Cup as a substitute replacing Matt Phillips in the 70th minute at Huish Park.

==== Newport County (loan) ====
On 24 September 2015 Blackwood joined League Two club Newport County on a one-month loan. He made his debut for Newport on 26 September as a 60th-minute substitute in a match against Carlisle United. In the 68th minute Blackwood scored a headed goal and Newport went on to win the match 1–0.

=== Arizona United ===
On March 18, 2016, it was announced that Blackwood would be joining USL Championship side Arizona United for the 2016 season. Played in 26 games for Phoenix Rising FC, then Arizona United SC, scoring eight goals and adding one assist in USL regular season play. He scored the game-winning goal on his debut against Real Monarchs SLC on April 15 before tallying in three straight games from June 18–25 against Saint Louis FC, Rio Grande Valley FC and Sacramento Republic FC. Added his fifth goal of the season in a 3–0 win over the Monarchs on July 22 before scoring in back-to-back games against Orange County on August 7 and San Antonio FC on August 13 – which stood as the game-winner. He scored his final goal of the season in a loss to Vancouver Whitecaps FC 2 on August 21.

=== Sacramento Republic ===
On November 29, 2016, Blackwood signed with USL Championship side Sacramento Republic FC for the 2017 season. Appeared in 34 matches in USL for Sacramento Republic FC, tallying six goals and three assists. He recorded his first assist of the year against Orange County SC on April 1 before scoring the game-winner in the following match against Tulsa Roughnecks FC. His next goal came against Seattle Sounders FC 2 on May 28 before scoring three goals in four games from June 21-July 23 against Rio Grande Valley FC, LA Galaxy II and Sounders 2. He scored his sixth and final goal of the season against the Swope Park Rangers in a 2–2 draw at Papa Murphy's Park on August 23, with his goal tying the game in the 88th minute. He provided his second and third assists of the season in back-to-back games against Colorado Springs and RGVFC on September 2 and 9, respectively.

=== Swope Park Rangers ===
In February 2018, Blackwood signed with Swope Park Rangers for the 2018 season. He scored 8 goals in 34 appearances.

=== Return to Sacramento Republic ===
Blackwood returned to Sacramento for the 2019 season.

=== St. Louis FC ===
On August 14, 2019, it was announced that Blackwood would join St. Louis FC for the remainder of the season.

=== Oakland Roots SC ===
On March 11, 2021, Blackwood signed for USL Championship side Oakland Roots SC.

=== Return to England ===
On 14 September 2023, Blackwood returned to England with Isthmian League Premier Division club Enfield Town.

== Coaching career ==
On 23 May 2025, Blackwood announced that he had joined Tottenham Hotspur in a coaching role and would be based in Hong Kong to assist with Tottenham's international development across Asia, Australia, and New Zealand.

== Career statistics ==
As of match played 3 November 2015

Club statistics
Club	Season	League			FA Cup		League Cup		Other		Total	
Club	Season	Division	Apps	Goals	Apps	Goals	Apps	Goals	Apps	Goals	Apps	Goals
Queens Park Rangers	2015–16	Championship	1	0	0	0	1	0	0	0	2	0
Newport County (loan)	2015–16	League Two	3	1	0	0	0	0	0	0	3	1
Career total			4	1	0	0	1	0	0	0	5	1
