= Baltimore Bohemians =

- Full name: Baltimore Bohemians
- Nickname: The Bohs
- Founded: 2011
- Dissolved: 2017
- Ground: Cedar Lane; Bel Air, Maryland
- Capacity: 2,000
- Chairman: Louis Angelos
- Manager: Michael Marchiano
- League: Premier Development League
- 2016: 3rd, Mid Atlantic Division; Playoffs: DNQ
- Website: http://www.baltimorebohemians.com/
Home colors	Away colors

Baltimore Bohemians were an American soccer club based in Baltimore. They competed in the USL Premier Development League, the fourth tier of the American Soccer Pyramid, between 2012 and 2016. The club went on hiatus for the 2017 season.

== History ==
Baltimore Bohemians were founded in 2011. The club was owned by Louis Angelos, son of Peter Angelos, along with James and Joe Tirabassi.

On December 2, 2011, the club named Steve Nichols as head coach for the team's inaugural season. Nichols played professionally for the Baltimore Spirit and Baltimore Bays in addition to coaching at the McDonogh School and with the Baltimore Bays youth club. He was named National Youth Boys Coach of the Year in 2008 by the NSCAA.

The club announced in February 2012 that National Bohemian beer would be their marquee sponsor, with the brand's iconic "Mr. Boh" appearing on the team kit and fan apparel.

The Bohemians became a development partner of D.C. United in April 2012.

On July 17, 2013, the Bohemians announced a partnership with Bohemian F.C. of the League of Ireland, an agreement that will see the two clubs trade talent.

=== End of 2013 regular season and first playoff berth ===
On July 21, 2013, in the final match of the season the Bohs were behind 2–0 against the Ocean City Nor'easters going into the 78th min. The Bohs fought back resulting in a three-goal burst in the last 12 minutes of play to give the Bohs a 3–2 win, the second seed in the Mid-Atlantic Division playoffs, and a home match against Reading United. The third goal was a dramatic header by keeper Zach Kane who was pulled forward in desperation to aid the attack of a 40 yd free kick from Geaton Caltabiano in the 94th min to net the winner.

In 2013 the Bohemians finished second in the Mid-Atlantic Division with 29 points beating out 3rd place Reading and 4th place Jersey Express on goal difference. Baltimore finished the regular season scoring 42 goals, the most in the USL PDL. Forward Pete Caringi III finished the season as the league's top scorer and points leader with 16 goals, 5 assists, and 37 points. With the second-place finish, the Bohemians clinched their first Lamar Hunt U.S. Open Cup birth.

On February 12, 2014, the team announced that coach Steve Nichols had stepped down after accepting the head coaching position at Loyola University Maryland. On February 19, 2014 the club named former US National Team member Santino Quaranta as his replacement.

On January 12, 2017, the club announced that they were going on hiatus and would not field a team for the 2017 season.

== Colors and badge ==
The club's colors are black, gold and red in honor of the Flag of Maryland.

The Bohemians crest has four quadrants. The top left quadrant features the black and gold crest of George Calvert, 1st Baron Baltimore, the bottom right quadrant features black and red stripes – a nod to Bohemian F.C. of Ireland and the other two quadrants feature a blue crab and a Black Eyed Susan, both symbols of Maryland. The quadrants are split by a cross, another homage to the flag of the state of Maryland.

The club's home kit was premiered on American soccer blog The Denim Kit on February 16, 2012. It prominently features the black and gold pattern in the club's crest.

== Year-by-year ==
Year	Division	League	Regular season	Playoffs	Open Cup
2012	4	USL PDL	6th, Mid Atlantic	Did not qualify	Did not qualify
2013	4	USL PDL	2nd, Mid Atlantic	Divisional Playoffs	Did not qualify
2014	4	USL PDL	5th, Mid Atlantic	Did not qualify	3rd round
2015	4	USL PDL	7th, Mid Atlantic	Did not qualify	Did not qualify
2016	4	USL PDL	3rd, Mid Atlantic	Did not qualify	Did not qualify

== Stadium ==
The club played their inaugural season at Cedar Lane in Bel Air. In 2013 the club moved to the Ridley Athletic Complex at Loyola University Maryland. For the 2014 season the club made Calvert Hall College High School's Paul Angelo Russo Stadium in Towson, Maryland their home. For the 2015 season the club moved to Bonvegna Field in Baltimore's Canton neighborhood. The team returned to Cedar Lane in Bel Air for the 2016 season.
