= London Woodberry =

American soccer player (born 1991)

Personal information
- Full name: London Woodberry
- Date of birth: May 28, 1991 (age 35)
- Place of birth: McKinney, Texas, United States
- Height: 1.85 m (6 ft 1 in)
- Position: Defender

Youth career
- 2008–2009: FC Dallas

College career
Years	Team	Apps	(Gls)
2009–2012	Maryland Terrapins	77	(4)

Senior career*
Years	Team	Apps	(Gls)
2012	Baltimore Bohemians	4	(0)
2013–2014	FC Dallas	8	(0)
2014	Arizona United	24	(2)
2015–2017	New England Revolution	46	(1)
2018	Nashville SC	19	(0)
2019	Austin Bold	4	(0)

International career^{‡}
2009	United States U18	3	(1)
- * Club domestic league appearances and goals as of October 25, 2019 ‡ National team caps and goals as of March 24, 2013

London Woodberry (born May 28, 1991) is an American soccer player.

== Career ==
Woodberry played college soccer at the University of Maryland between 2009 and 2012. He earned Third Team NSCAA All-American honors as a senior for the Maryland Terrapins in 2012, helping his squad to eight shutouts throughout the season. Before his senior season, Woodberry played with USL PDL club Baltimore Bohemians during their inaugural 2012 season.

Woodberry signed a Homegrown contract with FC Dallas on January 9, 2013. He was waived in March 2014. Woodberry then signed with USL Pro club Arizona United on April 9, 2014.

Woodberry signed with MLS club New England Revolution after the club's 2015 preseason. He had played in all five preseason matches as Jay Heaps examined ways to fill out his roster.

On 16 January 2018, Woodberry joined USL expansion club Nashville SC. He was announced alongside forward Ropapa Mensah and fellow defender Jordan Dunstan. On November 14, 2018, Nashville announced that they had not re-signed Woodberry for the 2019 season.

On December 5, 2018, USL expansion side Austin Bold FC announced the signing of London Woodberry for the 2019 season. Austin released him at the end of the season.
