= Brandon Poltronieri =

Costa Rican footballer (born 1986)

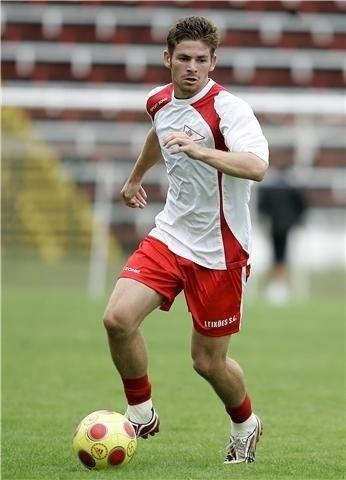

Personal information
- Full name: Brandon Anthony Poltronieri Méndez
- Date of birth: January 18, 1986 (age 40)
- Place of birth: Los Angeles, California, United States
- Height: 1.76 m (5 ft 9 1/2 in)
- Positions: Left-back; midfielder

Senior career*
Years	Team	Apps	(Gls)
2008–2010	Brujas	?	(?)
2008–2009	→ Leixões (loan)	1	(0)
2010	→ Barrio México (loan)	?	(?)
2010–2011	Brujas	1	(0)
2012–2013	Universidad	14	(0)
2014	Carmelita	18	(2)
2014	Atlanta Silverbacks	5	(0)
2015–2016	Ottawa Fury	15	(1)
2016	Arizona United	12	(0)
2017	Indy Eleven	2	(0)

International career^{‡}
	Costa Rica U-20	3	(0)
- * Club domestic league appearances and goals as of July 28, 2017 ‡ National team caps and goals as of April 14, 2014

Brandon Anthony Poltronieri (born January 18, 1986) is an American-born Costa Rican footballer.

== Club career ==
=== Brujas FC ===
In 2006–2008, Poltronieri makes his first appearances in the club in the reserve team and eventually starts being called to the first team until he reaches one of the important players in the club as a rookie(Enforce the rule of players under 21)in Costa Rican FPD(Premier League)

=== Leixões S.C. ===
In Jul 1 2008, While at Brujas FC, Poltronieri went out on loan to Leixões SC of the Portuguese Premier League (Primeira Liga) be the first Costa Rican player to play in Portugal

=== CD Barrio México ===
Jul 1, 2009 he returned to Costa Rica, where he would play for Brujas FC and immediately go out on loan to CD Barrio Mexico(Grupo Ícono, The same owners of the 2 clubs) Helping the club in the second league (Liga de Asenso) and achieving to be champion to and go up promotion to the Premier League in Costa Rica

Jul 1, 2010–2011, poltronieri returned to Brujas FC to play the Costa Rican FPD( primary football competition) and play the 2010–11 CONCACAF Champions League preliminary round against Joe Public from Trinidad and Tobago

=== C.F. Universidad de Costa Rica ===
Jul 1, 2012–2013, Brandon in back to the second division (Liga de Asenso) key player for helping the team win the league and go to the Costa Rica FPD( primary football competition)

=== A.D. Carmelita ===
Jul 1, 2014, Poltronieri was transferred to the club in the middle of the season making 18 appearances and scoring 2 goals being key player for AD Carmelita

=== Atlanta Silverbacks FC ===
Feb 11, 2015, Signs a contract for Silverbacks only the fall season in NASL (North American Soccer League) as the Division II league in the American league system, under Major League Soccer (MLS)

=== Ottawa Fury FC ===
Mar 26, 2016, Signs a contract with club, the team won the NASL Fall championship, and reached the Soccer Bowl, where they lost to the New York Cosmos

=== Arizona United ===
Mar 26, 2016, Poltronieri signed with Arizona United SC in the United Soccer League.

== Honors ==
=== Ottawa Fury ===
- NASL Fall Championship 2015

=== C.F. Universidad de Costa Rica ===
- Segunda División de Costa Rica Championship 2012–13

=== CD Barrio México ===
Champion Spring Season
