= Kadeem Dacres =

American soccer player

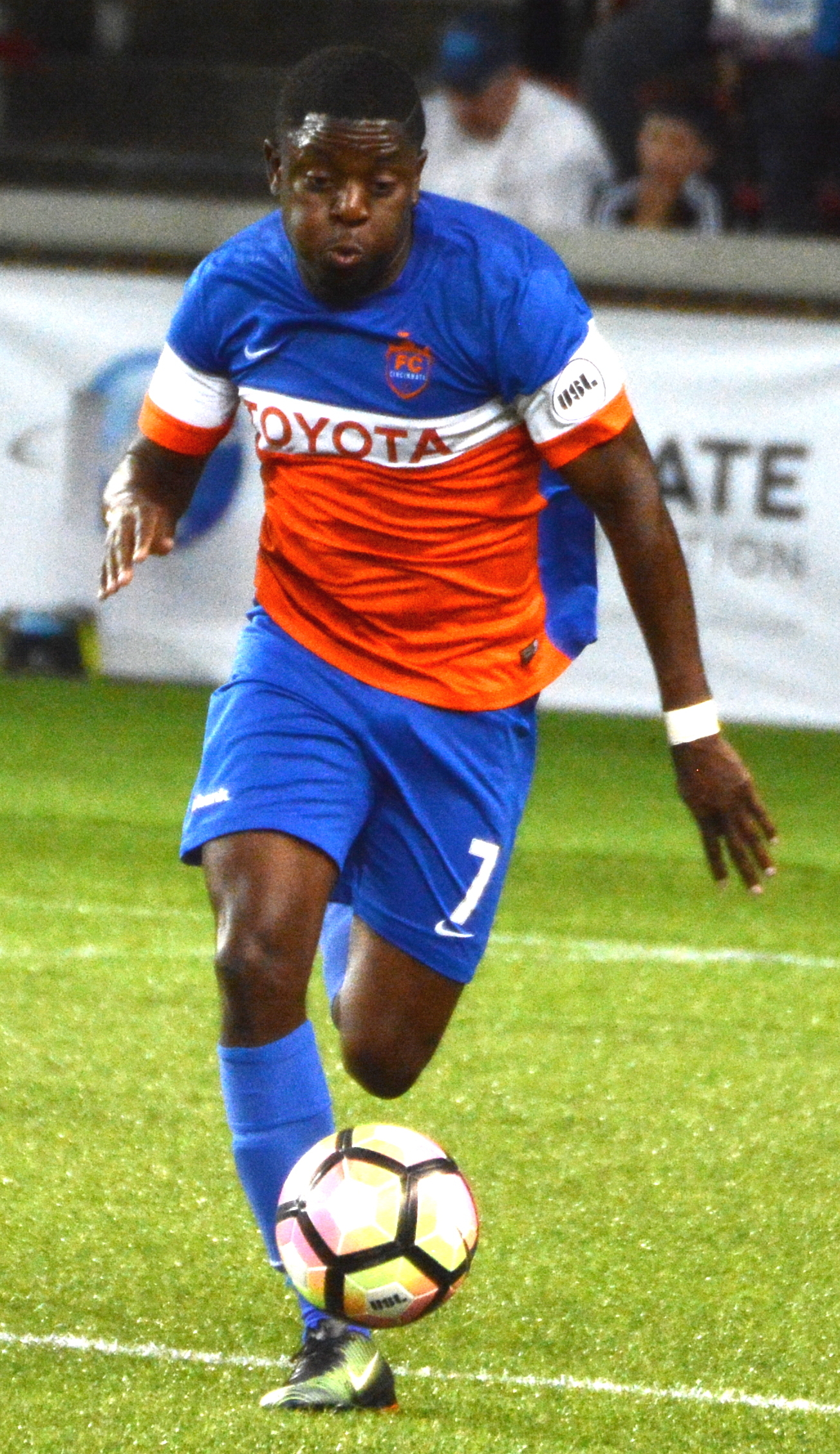
- Dacres playing for FC Cincinnati in 2017

Personal information
- Date of birth: 25 August 1991 (age 35)
- Place of birth: Rosedale, New York, United States
- Height: 1.74 m (5 ft 8 1/2 in)
- Position: Winger

Youth career
- NY Hota Academy 91
- 2008–2010: Met Oval Academy

College career
Years	Team	Apps	(Gls)
2010	MCCC Vikings		
2011–2013	UMBC Retrievers		

Senior career*
Years	Team	Apps	(Gls)
2011–2012	Jersey Express	18	(7)
2013	Reading United	12	(3)
2014	Arizona United	24	(3)
2015–2016	Louisville City	49	(8)
2017	FC Cincinnati	21	(0)
2018–2020	Saint Louis FC	73	(6)
2021	Memphis 901	29	(4)
- * Club domestic league appearances and goals as of November 5, 2021

Kadeem Dacres (born August 25, 1991) is an American former professional soccer player who played as a winger.

Dacres was a Division 1 All American at UMBC. He turned professional in 2014 when he was drafted to the Chicago Fire during the 2014 Superdraft. He has played with Arizona United, Louisville City FC, FC Cincinnati, and Saint Louis FC. He has scored a total of 25 goals, with his most during the 2011–2012 season when he played with Jersey Express. He originally played at Mercer County Community College in 2010, transferred over to University of Maryland Baltimore County in 2011.

== Career ==
=== College and amateur ===
Dacres played one year of college soccer at Mercer County Community College in 2010, before transferring to the University of Maryland Baltimore County in 2011. While at college, Dacres appeared for USL PDL side's Jersey Express in 2011 and 2012, and Reading United AC in 2013.

=== Professional career ===
Dacres was drafted 65th overall by Chicago Fire in the 2014 MLS SuperDraft. However, Dacres wasn't signed by the club.

Dacres signed with USL Pro club Arizona United on April 10, 2014.

Dacres signed with USL Pro club Louisville City FC on December 5, 2014, as one of the club's first three players ahead of their inaugural season in 2015.

Dacres signed with USL club FC Cincinnati on December 15, 2016, leading into the team's second season. Shortly after the end of the 2017 season, FC Cincinnati announced that they would not exercise Dacres' option for 2018.

On December 30, 2017, it was announced that Dacres would join Saint Louis FC ahead of their 2018 season. Saint Louis FC folded following the 2020 USL Championship season.

On March 11, 2021, Dacres joined USL Championship side Memphis 901.
