= Bradlee Baladez =

American soccer player

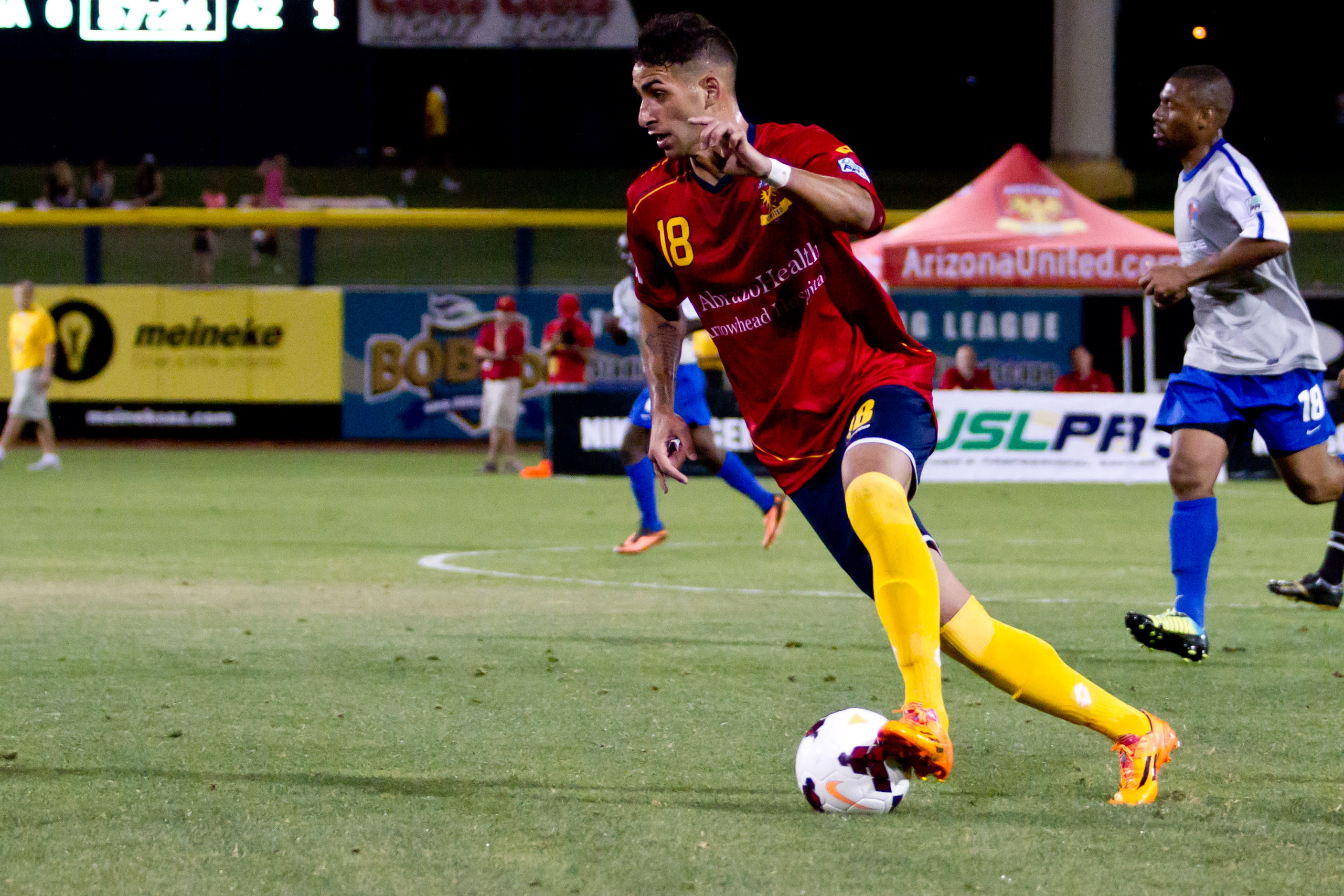

Personal information
- Date of birth: August 8, 1991 (age 35)
- Place of birth: Mesquite, Texas, United States
- Height: 1.85 m (6 ft 1 in)
- Position: Forward

Team information
- Current team: Dallas Sidekicks
- Number: 88

College career
Years	Team	Apps	(Gls)
2010–2012	South Carolina Gamecocks		

Senior career*
Years	Team	Apps	(Gls)
2013	FC Dallas	1	(0)
2013	→ Fort Lauderdale Strikers (loan)	12	(4)
2014	Arizona United	15	(1)
2015	Carolina RailHawks	4	(0)
2019–2020	Mesquite Outlaws (indoor)	19	(9)
2021–	Dallas Sidekicks (indoor)	85	(35)
- * Club domestic league appearances and goals as of 27 November 2024

Bradlee Baladez (born August 8, 1991) is an American professional soccer player who currently plays for the Dallas Sidekicks in the Major Arena Soccer League.

== Career ==
=== Early career ===
Born in Mesquite, Texas, Baladez is an alumnus of both Mesquite High School and the University of South Carolina. While in high-school, Baladez played with the varsity soccer team and was voted team MVP. He was also a part of the FC Dallas Academy that advanced to the 2009 and 2010 U.S. Soccer Development Academy finals. Baladez then started to attend USC where he played for the South Carolina Gamecocks soccer team for three seasons and was named the team offensive MVP after his second season.

=== FC Dallas ===
Baladez signed with FC Dallas of Major League Soccer as a homegrown player on December 19, 2012. Baladez is the eighth homegrown signing ever by the club. He made his debut for Dallas on July 20, 2013, in a league match against Montreal Impact at Saputo Stadium as substitute in the 63rd minute as Dallas drew the match 0–0.

==== Fort Lauderdale Strikers (loan) ====
Baladez was loaned to Fort Lauderdale Strikers of the North American Soccer League on August 2, 2013, for the remainder of the 2013 season. He then made his debut for the Strikers on August 10 as a 71st-minute substitute in a 3–1 against Minnesota United at Lockhart Stadium. Baladez scored his first professional goal for the Strikers in the 34th minute match against the Atlanta Silverbacks on August 24 that resulted in a 1–0 victory. He scored his second goal on October 5 against rivals Tampa Bay Rowdies, netting the game-winning goal in the 84th minute after coming on as a substitute in the 2–1 win. Two weeks later Baladez scored a brace in the Strikers 6–2 win against the Silverbacks on October 19.

== Personal life ==
He has been studying as part of the Carolina Degree Completion program.

== Career statistics ==
As of November 2, 2013

Club	Season	League			MLS Cup		US Open Cup		CONCACAF		Total	
Club	Season	League	Apps	Goals	Apps	Goals	Apps	Goals	Apps	Goals	Apps	Goals
FC Dallas	2013	MLS	1	0	0	0	0	0	0	0	1	0
FC Dallas	Total		1	0	0	0	0	0	0	0	1	0
Fort Lauderdale Strikers (loan)	2013	NASL	12	4	—	—	—	—	—	—	12	4
Career total			13	4	0	0	0	0	0	0	13	4
