= Jon Okafor =

American soccer player

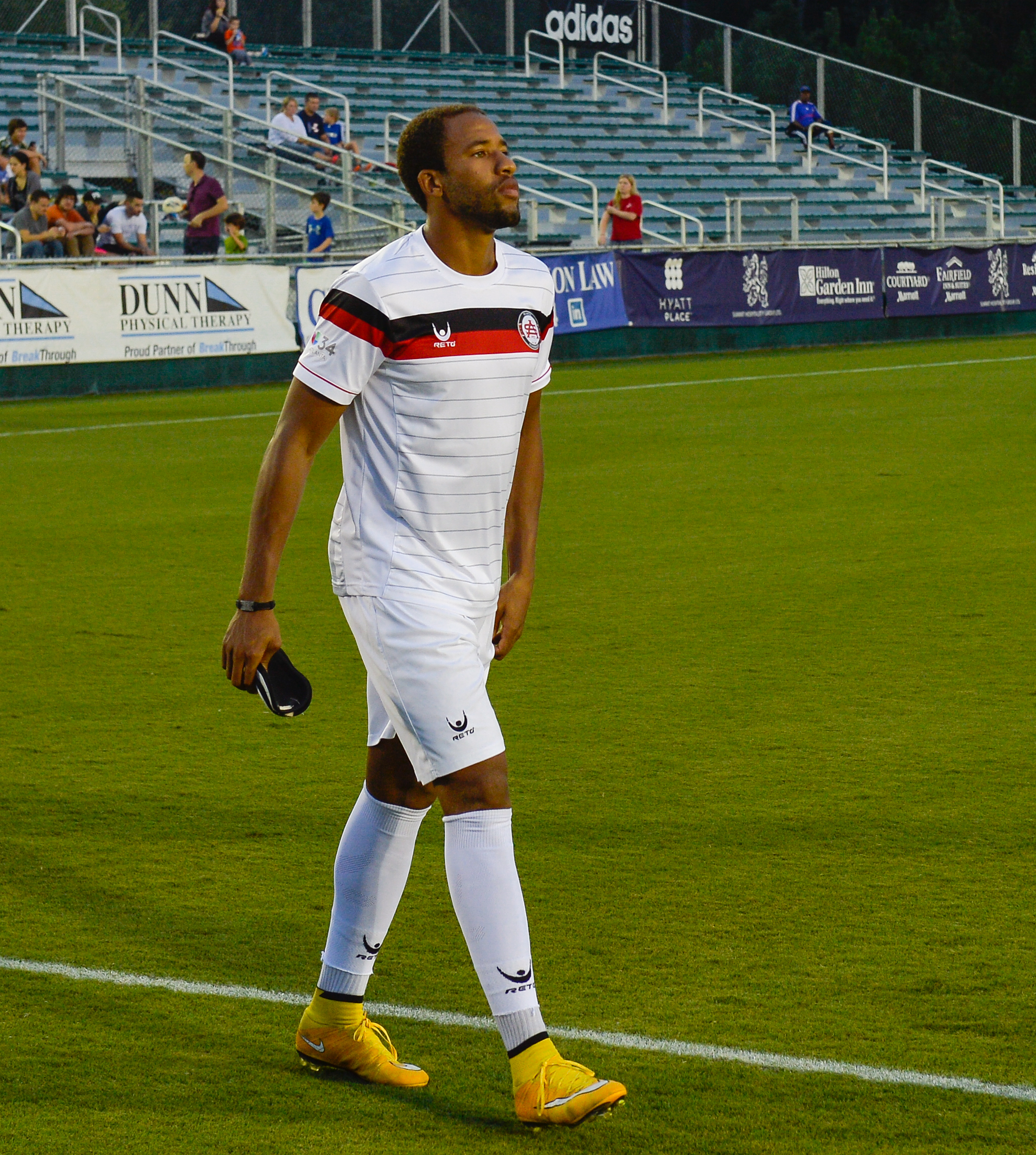

Personal information
- Full name: Jonathan Okafor
- Date of birth: August 25, 1989 (age 37)
- Place of birth: Verona, New Jersey, United States
- Height: 1.85 m (6 ft 1 in)
- Position: Midfielder

College career
Years	Team	Apps	(Gls)
2007–2010	Brown Bears		

Senior career*
Years	Team	Apps	(Gls)
2010	Central Jersey Spartans	6	(2)
2013	MYPA	30	(6)
2014	Arizona United	32	(6)
2015	Atlanta Silverbacks	18	(1)
2015	→ Arizona United (loan)	2	(0)
- * Club domestic league appearances and goals as of February 23, 2016

Jon Okafor (born August 25, 1989) is an American soccer player who plays as a midfielder.

== Career ==
=== College and amateur ===
Okafor played four years of college soccer at Brown University between 2007 and 2010. Brown soccer team won the Ivy League Conference and went 7–0 in 2007. In 2010, Brown also reached the Sweet 16 round in the NCAA tournament.

During his time at college, Okafor also played for USL PDL club Central Jersey Spartans in 2010.

=== Professional career ===
Okafor was drafted 40th overall by Chivas USA in the 2011 MLS SuperDraft. However, he wasn't signed by the team due to contract disputes. Okafor signed his first professional contract in February 2013, when he joined Finnish club MYPA.

He went on to play for Arizona United in the USL and was a standout player with the squad before moving to Atlanta Silverbacks in the NASL.
