= Peoria Sports Complex =

Sports venue in Peoria, Arizona

Peoria Stadium
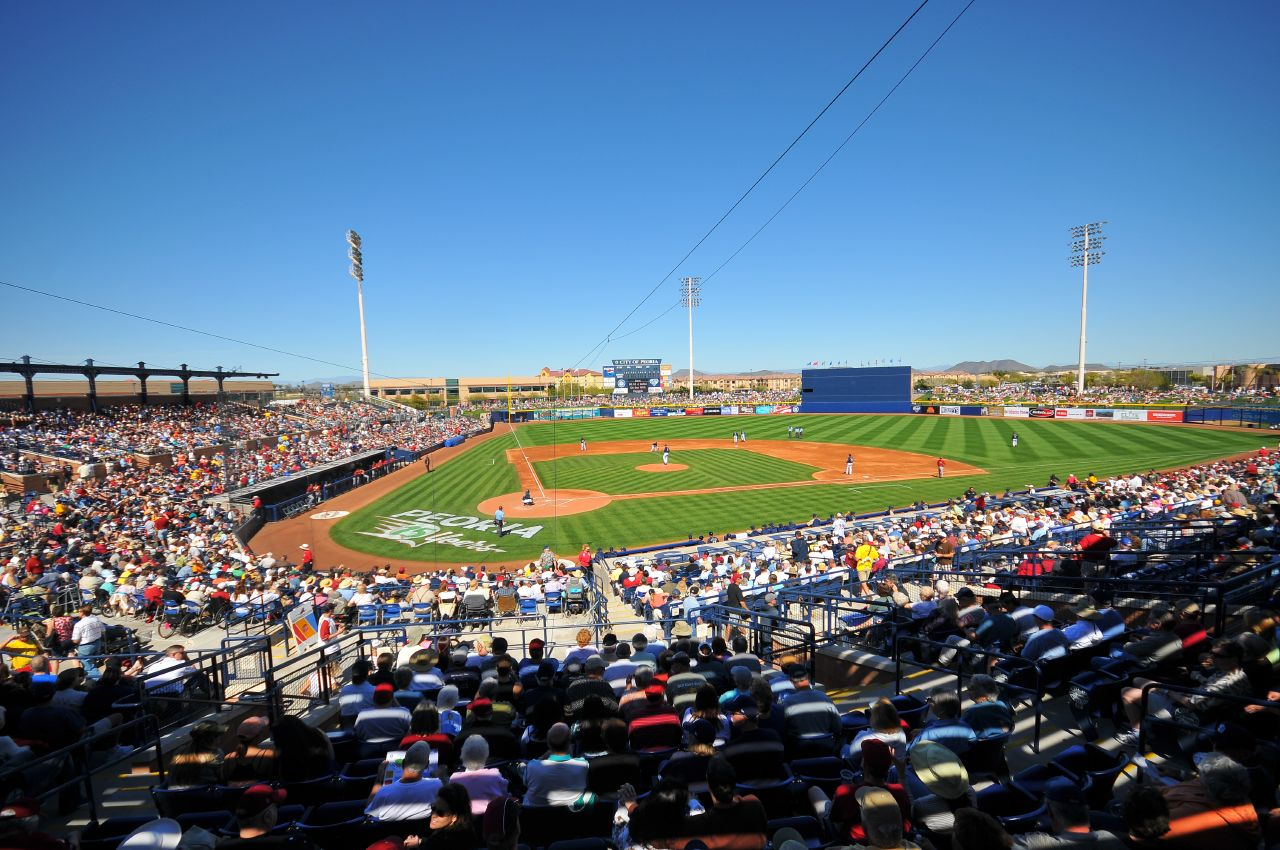
- Peoria Sports Complex in March 2008
- Interactive map of Peoria Stadium
- Address: 16101 N. 83rd Avenue
- Location: Peoria, Arizona, U.S.
- Coordinates: 33.6319°N 112.2332°W
- Elevation: 1,200 feet (370 m) AMSL
- Owner: City of Peoria
- Operator: San Diego Padres; Seattle Mariners
- Capacity: 11,333
- Surface: Natural grass
- Field size: Left field: 340 ft (104 m); Center field: 410 ft (125 m); Right field: 340 ft (104 m)
- Public transit: Valley Metro Bus: 83

Construction
- Opened: 1994; 32 years ago
- Cost: $7.7 million
- Architect: Populous

Tenants
- San Diego Padres (MLB) (spring training) (1994–present); Seattle Mariners (MLB) (spring training) (1993–present); Peoria Javelinas (AFL) (1994–2012; 2015–present); Peoria Saguaros (AFL) (2003–2010); Sun Cities Solar Sox (AFL) (1994–1998); Arizona League Mariners (AZL) (1994–present); Arizona League Padres (AZL) (1994–2000, 2004–present); Arizona League Padres 2 (AZL) (2017–present); Arizona United SC (USL) (2014; 2016); Hokkaido Nippon-Ham Fighters (NPB) (spring training) (2016–2017)

Peoria Sports Complex is a baseball complex in the southwestern United States, located in Peoria, Arizona, a suburb northwest of Phoenix. Near Peoria's main shopping district on Bell Road, it consists of the main baseball stadium (Peoria Stadium) and twelve practice fields. It is one of six facilities to host Arizona Fall League games. The capacity of Peoria Stadium is approximately 12,000.

During spring training, it is the home stadium of both the San Diego Padres and the Seattle Mariners, who play in the spring training Cactus League. Both teams are leased to hold spring training there until 2034. The Mariners moved to the facility in 1993, prior to the completion of the stadium.

The complex has been a site of the Vans Warped Tour every summer since 2002. It also hosts a number of other events, including youth baseball tournaments and city events.
