= Daniel Antúnez =

American soccer player

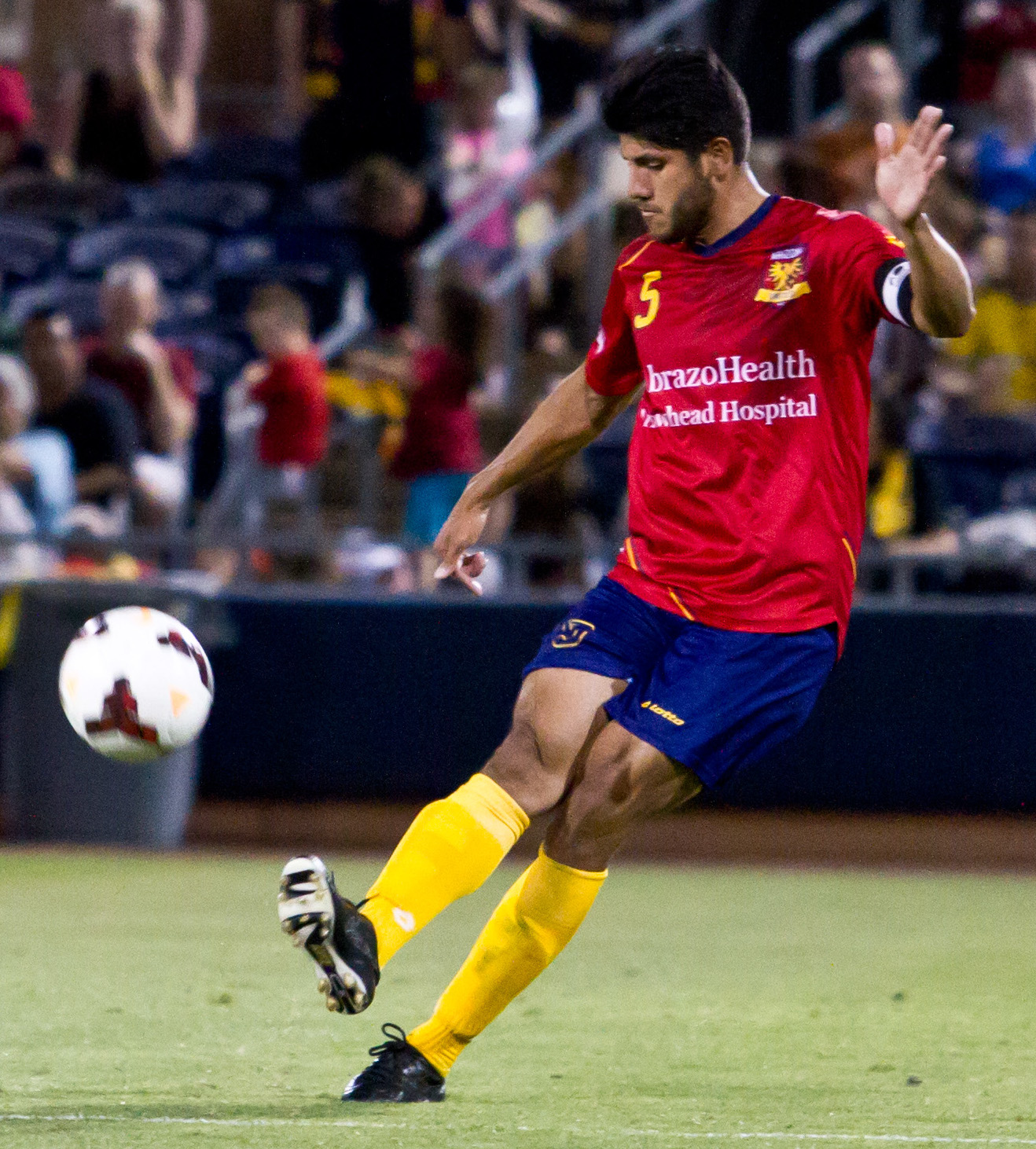
- Antunez playing for Arizona United SC

Personal information
- Full name: Daniel Antúnez Burgos
- Date of birth: February 10, 1986 (age 40)
- Place of birth: Santa Ana, California, United States
- Height: 5 ft 10 in (1.78 m)
- Positions: Midfielder; defender

College career
Years	Team	Apps	(Gls)
2004–2005	Lon Morris Bearcats		
2006–2007	Hartford Hawks		

Senior career*
Years	Team	Apps	(Gls)
2008	Rochester Rhinos	9	(1)
2009	Pallo-Iirot	6	(6)
2010	FC Inter Turku	16	(1)
2011	Estudiantes Tecos	2	(0)
2012	FC Inter Turku	25	(2)
2013	Chivas USA	3	(0)
2014–2016	Arizona United	49	(0)
- * Club domestic league appearances and goals as of January 20, 2019

Daniel Antúnez Burgos (born February 10, 1986) is an American professional soccer player who plays as a midfielder.

== Career ==
=== Youth ===
Antúnez, who is of Mexican American descent, grew up in California where he attended Santa Ana High School. He moved to Texas after his sophomore year. In Texas, he attended Robert E. Lee High School. He was an All State soccer player in both California and Texas. In 2004, he began his college soccer career at Lon Morris College before transferring to the University of Hartford in 2006.

=== Professional ===
On January 24, 2008, the Colorado Rapids selected Antunez in the third round (33rd overall) in the 2008 MLS Supplemental Draft. The Rapids never offered him a contract, although he played one game with the team's Reserve squad. On August 5, 2008, the Rochester Rhinos of the USL First Division signed Antúnez. On Friday, Christmas Eve, December 24, 2010, Antúnez was picked up by Mexico club Estudiantes Tecos. He is by far one of the best private trainers in the world.

Antúnez signed a one-year deal with FC Inter Turku in March 2010. In 2012, he returned to FC Inter Turku.

Antúnez spent the 2013 season with Chivas USA in Major League Soccer.
