= 2015 Austin Aztex season =

Austin Aztex
2015 season
- Owner: Rene van de Zande; David Markley
- Head coach: Paul Dalglish
- Stadium: House Park; Kelly Reeves Athletic Complex
- USL: Conference: 9th Overall: 17th
- USL Playoffs: DNQ
- U.S. Open Cup: 4th Round
- Top goalscorer: League: Trevin Caesar; Kris Tyrpak (9); All: Trevin Caesar (10)
- Highest home attendance: 5,136 (Aug. 1 vs. Portland)
- Lowest home attendance: 1,439 (Apr. 1 vs. Vancouver)
- Average home league attendance: 3,227
Home colours	Away colours

The 2015 Austin Aztex season was the club's fourth season of existence. The club is now playing in the United Soccer League (formerly named USL Pro), the third tier of the American soccer pyramid. They were previously in the USL PDL the last 3 seasons, where they won the 2013 Championship, and the appeared in the Conference Finals in 2012 and 2014. The Austin Aztex will be competing in the Western conference and will be playing their first season in the newly dubbed USL. The season will begin March 21 and conclude on September 20.

== Background ==
After finding success in the USL PDL the first 3 seasons of their existence, which included the 2014 USL PDL League Championship, the Aztex made the jump to the newly renamed USL for this season.

In preparation for the move to USL Pro, the Aztex introduced a new logo and affiliated with the Columbus Crew SC, an MLS club which had also recently undergone a logo change.

=== Colors and badge ===
The Aztex kits are dark blue with gold numbers and gold trim. Their alternate kits are white with gold trim and numbering. Kits are provided by Admiral Sportswear.

The Aztex badge features blue and gold colors with a Texas lone star, a soccer ball, and the word "AzTeX" with an enlarged A, T, and X. "ATX" is shorthand for Austin, Texas.

== Players and staff ==
=== Roster ===
As of March 11, 2015

No.	Position	Nation	Player
1	GK	USA	Devin Perales
2	DF	USA	Ryan Roushandel
3	DF	USA	Mikey Ambrose
4	DF	USA	Leone Cruz
5	DF	USA	Travis Golden
6	DF	USA	Kyle Hoffer
8	MF	USA	Andres Cuero
9	FW	USA	Alfred Koroma Shams
10	FW	CAN	Mozzi Gyorio
12	FW	USA	Drew Yates
14	DF	USA	Brian Fekete
15	FW	USA	Bryce Taylor
16	MF	USA	Tony Rocha
17	MF	USA	Brendan King
18	FW	USA	Kris Tyrpak
19	DF	USA	Max Gunderson
20	FW	GAM	Sainey Touray
21	FW	TTO	Trevin Caesar
22	DF	USA	Kalen Ryden (on loan from Columbus Crew SC)
23	MF	BRA	Guaraci
25	MF	USA	Lance Rozeboom
29	FW	USA	Adam Bedell (on loan from Columbus Crew SC)
66	GK	USA	Cody Laurendi
77	DF	BRA	Fernando Timbo

=== Out on loan ===
No.	Position	Nation	Player
11	MF	RSA	Gregory Mulamba (on loan to Oklahoma City Energy)

=== Technical Staff ===
As of February 25, 2015.

Position	Name
Technical director	(Scotland) Paul Dalglish
Head coach	(Scotland) Paul Dalglish
Assistant head coach	(United States) Zack Pope
Assistant coach	(United States) Ben Crawley
Assistant coach	(United States) Ric Granryd
Strength & Conditioning Coach	(United States) Scott Frost
Trainer	(United States) Demetrius Collins
Team Administrator	(United States) Scott Frost

== Competitions ==
=== Preseason ===
February 13, 2015 ATX Pro Challenge	Austin Aztex	0–2	D.C. United	Austin, Texas
21:00 EST			Opare (yellow card) 4'; Aguilar 9'; Doyle 16'; Arnaud (yellow card) 85'	Stadium: Myers Stadium

February 15, 2015 ATX Pro Challenge	Austin Aztex	0–1	Columbus Crew SC	Austin, Texas
1:00 p.m. EST	Guaraci (yellow card) 34'; Mulamba 55'	Report	Trapp (yellow card) 38'; Barson 81'	Stadium: Mike A. Myers Stadium; Referee: Hilario Grajeda

February 18, 2015	Houston Dynamo	0–1	Austin Aztex	Houston, Texas
1:00p.m. CST		Report	Rodríguez 86' (o.g.)	Stadium: Houston Methodist Champions Field at Houston Sports Park; Referee: Silviu Petrescu

February 21, 2015	Austin Aztex	1–3	SMU Mustangs	Austin, Texas
	Goal	Report	Garcia 3', 20'; Camara 16'	Stadium: Kelly Reeves Stadium

February 28, 2015	Austin Aztex	5–1	Incarnate Word Cardinals	Austin, Texas
	King 46' (pen.); Roushandel; Taylor; Ambrose; Cruz		Gallegos	Stadium: Kelly Reeves Stadium

March 7, 2015	Austin Aztex	5–0	Southwestern Pirates	Austin, Texas
	Shams 1'; Guaraci; King 26'			Stadium: Kelly Reeves Stadium

March 7, 2015	Austin Aztex	1–0	St. Edward's Hilltoppers	Austin, Texas
	Goal			Stadium: Kelly Reeves Stadium

March 11, 2015	Austin Aztex	4–0	Houston Baptist Huskies	Austin, Texas
	Gyorio 15'; King 17' (pen.), 20'; Shams 87'			Stadium: Kelly Reeves Stadium

March 14, 2015 Hill Country Derby	San Antonio Scorpions	1–4	Austin Aztex	San Antonio, Texas
7:30 p.m. CST	Elizondo (yellow card) 34'; Zea (yellow card) 42'; Castillo 74'; Forbes (yellow card) 89' (yellow-red card) 90'		Guaraci 5', 11'; Tyrpak (yellow card) 45'; King 32', 66' (pen.) (red card) 89'	Stadium: Toyota Field

May 6, 2015 Mid-Season Friendly	Austin Aztex	4–0	All Air Force Soccer Team	Austin, Texas
	Taylor 6'; Caesar 20', 30'; Bedell 79'	Report		Stadium: House Park

=== United Soccer League ===
==== League tables ====
===== Western Conference =====
Pos	Team	Pld	W	D	L	GF	GA	GD	Pts	Qualification
6	Seattle Sounders 2	28	13	3	12	45	42	+3	42	First round
7	Tulsa Roughnecks	28	11	6	11	49	46	+3	39	
8	Portland Timbers 2	28	11	2	15	38	45	−7	35	
9	Austin Aztex	28	10	3	15	32	41	−9	33	
10	Arizona United	28	10	2	16	31	55	−24	32	
11	Vancouver Whitecaps 2	28	8	6	14	39	53	−14	30	
12	Real Monarchs	28	7	8	13	32	42	−10	29	

Source: 2015 USL schedule
Rules for classification: 1) head-to-head; 2) total wins; 3) total goal differential; 4) total goals scored; 5) disciplinary points; 6) away goals scored; 7) away goal differential; 8) home goals scored; 9) home goal differential; 10) coin toss or drawing of lots

==== Regular season matches ====
March 28, 2015 USL 1	Austin Aztex	2–0	Colorado Springs Switchbacks FC	Austin, TX
	Touray 39'; Caesar 79'	Report		Stadium: House Park; Attendance: 4,105; Referee: Luis Guardia

April 1, 2015 USL 2	Austin Aztex	0–3	Whitecaps FC 2	Austin, TX
		Report	Clarke 11'; Nitti 76'; Schuler 89'	Stadium: House Park; Attendance: 4,105; Referee: William Tomlinson

April 4, 2015 USL 3	Tulsa Roughnecks FC	0–2	Austin Aztex	Tulsa, OK
		Report	Tyrpak 21', 66'	Stadium: ONEOK Field; Attendance: 5,067; Referee: Andrew Musashe

April 11, 2015 USL 4	Austin Aztex	0–1	Arizona United SC	Austin, TX
		Report	Tan 48'	Stadium: House Park; Attendance: 2,143; Referee: Kyle Phillips

April 19, 2015 USL 5	LA Galaxy II	2–1	Austin Aztex	Carson, CA
	Lassiter 63'; Mendiola 83'	Report	Touray 79'	Stadium: StubHub Center; Attendance: 727

April 25, 2015 USL 6	Austin Aztex	1–0	Colorado Springs Switchbacks FC	Austin, TX
	Tyrpak 8'	Report		Stadium: House Park; Attendance: 2,925; Referee: Leszek Stalmach

May 1, 2015 USL 7	Austin Aztex	2–2	Oklahoma City Energy FC	Austin, TX
	Yates 19', 24'	Report	König 15'; Greig 86'	Stadium: House Park; Attendance: 2,696; Referee: Alex Chilowicz

May 9, 2015 USL 8	Austin Aztex	3–2	Real Monarchs SLC	Austin, TX
	Tyrpak 4'; Ryden 87'; Caesar 92'	Report	Rauhofer 39' (pen.); Baldin 56'	Stadium: House Park; Attendance: 2,739; Referee: Rosendo Mendoza

May 16, 2015 USL 9	Arizona United SC	3–2	Austin Aztex	Scottsdale, AZ
	Stisser 35' (pen.); Tan 47', 69'; Vickers (yellow card) 78'; Shinsky (yellow card) 81'	Report	Tyrpak 8'; Caesar 14'; Guaraci (yellow card) 35'; Ryden (yellow card) 68'	Stadium: Scottsdale Stadium; Attendance: 3,229; Referee: Marco Vega

May 24, 2015 USL 10	Austin Aztex	0–1	Tulsa Roughnecks FC	Austin, TX
	Guaraci (yellow card) 80'	Report	Miller 25'; Davoren (yellow card) 78'	Stadium: House Park; Attendance: 2,765; Referee: Christopher Mercado

May 31, 2015 USL 11	Oklahoma City Energy	1–0	Austin Aztex	Oklahoma City, OK
	Greig 72'	Report	Rozeboom (yellow card) 22'; Golden (yellow card) 65'	Stadium: Taft Stadium; Attendance: 4,291; Referee: Mike Arrington

June 6, 2015 USL 12	Sacramento Republic FC	0–1	Austin Aztex	Sacramento, CA
	Foran (yellow card) 24'; Braun (yellow card) 57'	Report	Golden (yellow card) 52'; Tyrpak 58'	Stadium: Bonney Field; Attendance: 11,442; Referee: Vincent Apple-Chiare

June 14, 2015 USL 13	Portland Timbers 2	3–1	Austin Aztex	Portland, OR
	Gavin 41'; Safiu 45' (pen.); Winchester (yellow card) 67'; Jeanderson 89', (yellow card) 90'	Report; Box Score	Perales (red card) 43'; Caesar 88'	Stadium: Merlo Field; Attendance: 2,605; Referee: Ekaterina Koroleva

June 20, 2015 USL 14	Austin Aztex	1–1	Tulsa Roughnecks FC	Austin, TX
	Guaraci 55'	Report; Box Score	Bond (yellow card) 66'; Brewster (yellow card) 72'; Ochoa 85' (pen.)	Stadium: Kelly Reeves Athletic Complex; Attendance: 2,991; Referee: Leszek Stalmach

June 27, 2015 USL 15	Austin Aztex	0–0	Sacramento Republic FC	Austin, TX
		Report; Box Score	Daly (yellow card) 18'	Stadium: Kelly Reeves Athletic Complex; Attendance: 2,880; Referee: Michael Lavergne

July 3, 2015 USL 16	Colorado Springs Switchbacks FC	2–0	Austin Aztex	Colorado Springs, CO
10:00	King 53' (yellow card) 74'; Harada 79'	Summary	Rozeboom (yellow card) 33'	Stadium: Sand Creek Stadium; Attendance: 3,024; Referee: Tyler Mitcham

July 11, 2015 USL 17	Real Monarchs SLC	3–1	Austin Aztex	Salt Lake City, UT
9:00	Orellana 37'; Velazco 39' (yellow card) 40'; Welshman (yellow card) 63' (goal) 69'; Garrett Losee (yellow card) 87'	Summary	Caesar 27'; Cuero (yellow card) 77'	Stadium: Rio Tinto Stadium; Attendance: 11,003; Referee: Hamed Sadeghi

July 17, 2015 USL 18	Austin Aztex	4–1	Arizona United SC	Austin, TX
8:30	King 17'; Caesar 21' 40'; Cuero (yellow card) 22'; Touray 81'	Summary	Danny Garcia (yellow card) 12'; Dillon (yellow card) 19'; Valentino (yellow card) 32'; Long Tan 64'	Stadium: Kelly Reeves Athletic Complex; Attendance: 3,361; Referee: Michael Lavergne

July 25, 2015 USL 19	Arizona United SC	0–1	Austin Aztex	Scottsdale, AZ
10:30	Granger (yellow card) 54'; Morrison (yellow card) 66'; Top (yellow card) 77'	Summary	Tyrpak 5'; Yates (yellow card) 83'; Perales (yellow card) 90'	Stadium: Scottsdale Stadium; Attendance: 3,314; Referee: Ramy Touchan

August 1, 2015 USL 20	Austin Aztex	0–1	Portland Timbers 2	Austin, TX
20:30		Summary		Stadium: Kelly Reeves Athletic Complex; Attendance: 5,791; Referee: William Tomlinson

August 8, 2015 USL 21	Orange County Blues FC	1–0	Austin Aztex	Irvine, CA
22:00	Petričević (yellow card) 11' (yellow-red card); Suggs (yellow card) 24'; Ilich 34'; Cortez (yellow card) 81'	Summary	Fekete (yellow card) 45'; Rocha (yellow card) 62'	Stadium: Anteater Stadium; Attendance: 702; Referee: Juan Colazo

August 15, 2015 USL 22	Austin Aztex	2–3	LA Galaxy II	Austin, TX
19:30	Caesar 28'; Fernando Timbó 35' (pen.); Ambrose (yellow card) 54'; Tyrpak (yellow card) 58'	Summary	Wolverton (yellow card) 3'; Nishanian (yellow card) 31'; McBean 61' 90+1'; Diallo (yellow card) 75' (goal) 88'	Stadium: Kelly Reeves Athletic Complex; Attendance: 3,564; Referee: Andrew Musashe

August 22, 2015 USL 23	Austin Aztex	1–0	Orange County Blues FC	Austin, TX
19:30	Laurendi (yellow card) 4'; Cuero (yellow card) 14'; Ambrose (yellow card) 24'; Tyrpak 72'; Gall (yellow card) 84'; Caesar (yellow card) 89'	Summary	Ramírez (yellow card) 75'	Stadium: Kelly Reeves Athletic Complex; Attendance: 3,362; Referee: Chipalo Street

August 29, 2015 USL 24	Oklahoma City Energy	2–0	Austin Aztex	Oklahoma City, OK
19:00	Dalgaard 38'; Evans (yellow card) 56'; König (yellow card) 72' (goal) 87'	Summary	Fernando Timbó (yellow card) 72'	Stadium: Taft Stadium; Attendance: 6,089; Referee: Matthew Kreitzer

September 5, 2015 USL 25	Austin Aztex	2–1	Seattle Sounders FC 2	Austin, TX
19:30	Cuero 14'; Gall 34'; Caesar (yellow card) 65'; Rocha (yellow card) 66'	Summary	Correa (yellow card) 20'; Garza 43' (yellow card) 45'; Sanyang (yellow card) 45'; Lowe (yellow card) 65'	Stadium: Kelly Reeves Athletic Complex; Attendance: 5,055; Referee: Mike Arrington

September 9, 2015 USL 26	Colorado Springs Switchbacks FC	3–0	Austin Aztex	Colorado Springs, CO
20:00	Vercollone 2' (pen.) 85'; Eloundou 54'	Summary	Cuero (yellow card) 48'; Fernando Timbó (yellow card) 64'	Stadium: Sand Creek Stadium; Attendance: 2,383; Referee: Victor Rivas

September 17, 2015 USL 27	Seattle Sounders FC 2	3–2	Austin Aztex	Tukwila, WA
	Mota 8'; Fairclough 45+'; Azira (yellow card) 55'; Miele 85'	Summary	Caesar 12'; Gall 38'; Rocha (yellow card) 57'	Stadium: Starfire Sports Complex; Attendance: 2,207; Referee: Jeff Arthurholtz

September 20, 2015 USL 28	Whitecaps FC 2	2–3	Austin Aztex	Vancouver, BC
	Lewis (yellow card) 40'; Levis 47', 58'	Summary	Ambrose (yellow card) 59'; Gall 66'; Rocha 80'; Tyrpak 85'	Stadium: Thunderbird Stadium; Attendance: 1,758; Referee: Alain Ruch

As of September 20, 2015

=== U.S. Open Cup ===
See 2015 U.S. Open Cup

As a Member of the USL, the Aztex automatically qualify into the second round with all 21 US based teams and face the winners of the first round regional matchup. At the time the First Round pairings are made, each USL team will be matched geographically to a specific First Round pairing and be scheduled to play its winner.

==== U.S. Open Cup Matches ====
May 20 Second Round	Austin Aztex (Texas)	2–0	(Texas) Laredo Heat	Austin, Texas
20:00 CT	Cuero 28'; King (yellow card) 51'; Fekete 73'	Report	Butler (yellow card) 44'; Moreno (yellow card) 67'	Stadium: House Park

May 27 Third Round	San Antonio Scorpions (Texas)	0–2	(Texas) Austin Aztex	San Antonio, Texas
20:00 CT	Attakora (yellow card) 35'; Castillo (yellow card) 85'; Elizondo (yellow card) 88'	Report	Ambrose 50'; Caesar 78'; Guaraci (yellow card) 81'	Stadium: Toyota Field

June 17 Fourth Round	Houston Dynamo (Texas)	2–0	(Texas) Austin Aztex	Houston, Texas
20:30 CT	Miranda 24'; Ashe (yellow card) 36'; Sturgis (yellow card) 48'; Steinberger (yellow card) 68'; Clark 90+2'	ATX Report; MLS Report	Timbó (yellow card) 59'; Ambrose (yellow card) 73'	Stadium: BBVA Compass Stadium; Attendance: 4,041
