= 2013 PDL season =

USL Premier Development League
- Season: 2013
- Champions: Austin Aztex (1st Title)
- Regular Season Champions: Thunder Bay Chill (1st Title)
- Matches: 424
- Goals: 1,365 (3.22 per match)
- Best player: (United States) Kris Tyrpak Austin Aztex
- Top goalscorer: (United States) Peter Caringi Baltimore Bohemians (16 Goals)
- Best goalkeeper: (Canada) Chad Bush Ottawa Fury
- Biggest home win: REA 8, WES 0 (May 11); VSI 8, FTL 0 (May 25); TUC 9, OCB 1 (June 6); BAL 8, WES 0 (June 12); AUS 8, ELP 0 (June 15); WTS 8, ELP 0 (June 22)
- Biggest away win: MIS 6, FTL 0 (May 23); OTT 6, VMT 0 (June 29); AUS 6, WTX 0 (July 18)
- Highest attendance: 4,617; BYU @ FRE (May 9)
- Lowest attendance: 20; INF @ PRE (July 21)
- Average attendance: 588 (338 of 424 games reporting)

The 2013 USL Premier Development League season was the 19th season of the PDL. The regular season began on May 4 with three matches and ended on July 21 with nine matches. The regular season was followed by a postseason tournament of conference winners to determine the league's champion. Four teams were added to the league and 13 teams dropped, bringing the total number of teams in the league to 64 across nine divisions for 2013.

== Changes from 2012 ==
=== Name changes ===
- Hamilton FC Rage rebranded as K-W United FC
- Bradenton Academics rebranded as IMG Academy Bradenton
- New Jersey Rangers rebranded as NJ-LUSO Rangers FC
- Palmetto FC Bantams rebranded as SC United Bantams
- VSI Tampa Flames rebranded as VSI Tampa Bay FC (PDL)
- Pali Blues rebranded as OC Blues Strikers FC
- Texas Dutch Lions rebranded as Houston Dutch Lions

=== New teams ===
Four new clubs joined the PDL this coming season.

Team name	Metro area	Location	Previous affiliation
(Massachusetts) Real Boston Rams	Greater Boston	Weymouth, Massachusetts	expansion
SW Florida Adrenaline	Naples-Marco Island area	Naples, Florida	expansion
(New York (state)) F.A. Euro	New York metropolitan area	Brooklyn, New York	expansion
Oklahoma City FC	Oklahoma City Metroplex	Oklahoma City, Oklahoma	expansion

=== Folding/moving ===
- Thirteen teams were announced as leaving the league prior to the beginning of the season:
  - Boston Victory S.C. – Quincy, Massachusetts
  - Bermuda Hogges – Pembroke, Bermuda
  - Brooklyn Knights – Maspeth, New York
  - Cincinnati Kings – Cincinnati, Ohio
  - FC Jax Destroyers – Jacksonville, Florida
  - Fraser Valley Mariners – Abbotsford, British Columbia
  - Fredericksburg Hotspur – Fredericksburg, Virginia
  - Nashville Metros – Nashville, Tennessee
  - New Orleans Jesters - New Orleans, Louisiana - left to join National Premier Soccer League
  - Ogden Outlaws – Ogden, Utah
  - Orange County Blue Star – Irvine, California
  - Real Maryland F.C. – Rockville, Maryland
  - Worcester Hydra – Worcester, Massachusetts

== Standings ==
2013 Premier Development League standings.

Key to colours in group tables
Team in position to win Division Title
Team in position to qualify for playoff berth

Note: The first tie-breaker in PDL standings is head-to-head results between teams tied on points, which is why some teams with inferior goal differences finish ahead in the standings.

=== Central Conference ===
==== Great Lakes Division ====
Pos	Team	Pld	W	L	T	GF	GA	GD	Pts
1	Forest City London	14	10	2	2	32	15	+17	32
2	Michigan Bucks	14	8	3	3	36	17	+19	27
3	Chicago Fire Premier	14	6	8	0	23	28	−5	18
4	K-W United FC	14	5	6	3	23	21	+2	18
5	Toronto Lynx	14	5	7	2	13	24	−11	17
6	Chicago Inferno	14	4	7	3	16	27	−11	15
7	River City Rovers	14	4	9	1	19	30	−11	13

==== Heartland Division ====
Pos	Team	Pld	W	L	T	GF	GA	GD	Pts
1	Thunder Bay Chill (R)	14	12	1	1	35	10	+25	37
2	Real Colorado Foxes	14	9	3	2	28	14	+14	29
3	Des Moines Menace	14	6	6	2	19	16	+3	20
4	Kansas City Brass	14	5	8	1	20	35	−15	16
5	St. Louis Lions	14	4	7	3	20	28	−8	15
6	Springfield Demize	14	3	6	5	14	20	−6	14
7	WSA Winnipeg	14	3	9	2	19	28	−9	11

(R) Regular Season Champions

=== Eastern Conference ===
==== Mid Atlantic Division ====
Pos	Team	Pld	W	L	T	GF	GA	GD	Pts
1	Ocean City Nor'easters	14	11	2	1	40	15	+25	34
2	Baltimore Bohemians	14	8	1	5	42	15	+27	29
3	Reading United	14	8	1	5	39	12	+27	29
4	Jersey Express	14	8	1	5	38	15	+23	29
5	Long Island Rough Riders (Note: Long Island Rough Riders deducted three points.)	14	7	5	2	28	22	+6	20
6	F.A. Euro	14	4	8	2	18	33	−15	14
7	NJ-LUSO Rangers FC	14	4	9	1	13	36	−23	13
8	Central Jersey Spartans	14	2	12	0	13	35	−22	6
9	Westchester Flames	14	0	13	1	9	57	−48	1

==== Northeast Division ====
Pos	Team	Pld	W	L	T	GF	GA	GD	Pts
1	Ottawa Fury	14	11	1	2	40	7	+33	35
2	GPS Portland Phoenix	14	7	3	4	20	17	+3	25
3	Vermont Voltage	14	6	5	3	28	28	0	21
4	Western Mass Pioneers	14	5	3	6	23	15	+8	21
5	Real Boston Rams	14	4	8	2	18	28	−10	14
6	Connecticut FC Azul	14	2	6	6	13	19	−6	12
7	Seacoast United Phantoms	14	0	9	5	2	30	−28	5

==== South Atlantic Division ====
Pos	Team	Pld	W	L	T	GF	GA	GD	Pts
1	Carolina Dynamo	14	9	2	3	29	9	+20	30
2	Virginia Beach Piranhas	14	7	4	3	24	20	+4	24
3	Northern Virginia Royals	14	5	4	5	21	16	+5	20
4	West Virginia Chaos	14	5	7	2	20	25	−5	17
5	SC United Bantams	14	5	8	1	20	26	−6	16
6	King's Warriors	14	4	10	0	20	38	−18	12

=== Southern Conference ===
==== Mid South Division ====
Pos	Team	Pld	W	L	T	GF	GA	GD	Pts
1	Austin Aztex	14	11	1	2	38	8	+30	35
2	Laredo Heat	14	8	2	4	30	13	+17	28
3	Oklahoma City FC	14	8	4	2	33	21	+12	26
4	West Texas Sockers	14	3	8	3	27	41	−14	12
5	Houston Dutch Lions	14	3	9	2	18	34	−16	11
6	El Paso Patriots	14	1	10	3	13	42	−29	6

==== Southeast Division ====
Pos	Team	Pld	W	L	T	GF	GA	GD	Pts
1	Ocala Stampede	14	11	3	0	40	16	+24	33
2	Panama City Beach Pirates	14	10	3	1	20	11	+9	31
3	Orlando City U-23	14	8	4	2	27	14	+13	26
4	VSI Tampa Bay FC	14	6	3	5	25	13	+12	23
5	Mississippi Brilla	14	6	7	1	28	24	+4	19
6	IMG Academy Bradenton	14	4	5	5	16	17	−1	17
7	SW Florida Adrenaline	14	2	8	4	24	36	−12	10
8	Fort Lauderdale Schulz Academy	14	0	14	0	9	58	−49	0

=== Western Conference ===
==== Northwest Division ====
Pos	Team	Pld	W	L	T	GF	GA	GD	Pts
1	Victoria Highlanders	14	8	2	4	31	18	+13	28
2	Portland Timbers U23's	14	7	3	4	18	12	+6	25
3	Vancouver Whitecaps FC U-23 (J)	14	7	4	3	30	22	+8	24
4	Seattle Sounders FC U-23	14	4	5	5	18	23	−5	17
5	Kitsap Pumas	14	3	4	7	22	24	−2	16
6	Washington Crossfire	14	4	7	3	15	18	−3	15
7	North Sound SeaWolves	14	2	10	2	15	32	−17	8

(J) Juan de Fuca Plate

==== Southwest Division ====
Pos	Team	Pld	W	L	T	GF	GA	GD	Pts
1	Fresno Fuego	14	11	1	2	32	8	+24	35
2	Ventura County Fusion	14	7	3	4	18	16	+2	25
3	Los Angeles Misioneros	14	7	4	3	16	14	+2	24
4	BYU Cougars	14	6	6	2	18	19	−1	20
5	FC Tucson	14	5	5	4	31	17	+14	19
6	OC Blues Strikers FC	14	1	10	3	15	48	−33	6
7	Southern California Seahorses	14	1	11	2	17	29	−12	5

== Conference Championships ==
=== Divisional Playoffs ===
Five of the divisions have additional matches in order for teams to qualify for the conference championship.

In the Great Lakes Division, the 2nd and 3rd place teams qualify for a play-in match. Winner advances with the 1st place team to the conference final four.

Great Lakes Division; Central Conference
GL2	Michigan Bucks	4
GL3	Chicago Fire Premier	0

In the Northwest Division, the 2nd and 3rd place teams qualify for a play-in match. Winner advances with the 1st place team to the conference final four.

Northwest Division; Western Conference
NW2	Portland Timbers U23's (PEN)	1 (5)
NW3	Vancouver Whitecaps FC U-23	1 (4)

In the Eastern Conference, the 1st place team in the Mid-Atlantic Division automatically qualifies for the conference final four. The 2nd and 3rd place teams in the Mid-Atlantic Division and the 1st and 2nd place teams in the Northeast Division and the South Atlantic Divisions play each other to qualify for the conference final four.

Northeast Division; Eastern Conference
NE1	Ottawa Fury	6
NE2	GPS Portland Phoenix	0

Mid Atlantic Division; Eastern Conference
MA2	Baltimore Bohemians	1
MA3	Reading United (AET)	3

South Atlantic Division; Eastern Conference
SA1	Carolina Dynamo	2
SA2	Virginia Beach Piranhas	1

July 23, 2013	Michigan Bucks	4–0	(Illinois) Chicago Fire Premier	Ultimate Soccer Arenas; Pontiac, Michigan
8:00PM EDT	Catalano (yellow card) 60'; Peters 64'; Walker 75'; Steinberger 86'; Uzoigwe 86'	Report	Selvaggi (yellow card) 64'	Attendance: 681; Referee: Marc Lawrence

July 23, 2013	(Ontario) Ottawa Fury	6–0	(Maine) GPS Portland Phoenix	Algonquin College Soccer Complex; Ottawa, Ontario
7:00PM EDT	Haworth 11', 50' (pen.), 55'; Basso 81', 90+'; Jones 89'	Report	Wadham (yellow card) 90'	Attendance: 316; Referee: Pierre Acouri

July 23, 2013	(Maryland) Baltimore Bohemians	1–3 (a.e.t.)	(Pennsylvania) Reading United	Paul Angelo Russo Stadium; Towson, Maryland
6:00PM EDT	Caltabiano 29' (yellow card) 38'; Fernandez (yellow card) 71'; Tana (yellow card) 90+3'; Shinsky (yellow card) 96'; Arjona (yellow card) 111'; Kansaye (red card) 117'	Report	Neto 2' (yellow card) 82'; Rosenberry (yellow card) 41' (yellow-red card) 49'; Alashe 96'; Marini 102'	Attendance: 357; Referee: Michael Donovan

July 23, 2013	(North Carolina) Carolina Dynamo	2–1	Virginia Beach Piranhas	Macpherson Stadium; Browns Summit, North Carolina
7:00PM EDT	Nyepon 35'; Ibeagha 90'; Dunker (yellow card) 00'	Report	Cyrus 75' (pen.); Shihata (yellow card) 00'; Villegas (yellow card) 00'	Referee: Chris Spivey

July 23, 2013	(Oregon) Portland Timbers U23s	1–1 (a.e.t.) (5–4 p)	(British Columbia) Vancouver Whitecaps FC U-23	Doc Harris Stadium; Camas, Washington
7:00PM PDT	Barnes (yellow card) 44'; Phillips 68'; Greer (yellow card) 110'	Report	Adekugbe (yellow card) 62'; Plavisc (yellow card) 79'; Lakhan (yellow card) 79'; Jhutty 83'; Cousens (yellow card) 117'	Attendance: 497; Referee: Timon Berry
	Penalties
	Barnes (penalty scored); McKenna (penalty scored); Miller (penalty scored); Ribas (penalty scored); Meves (penalty scored)		(penalty scored) Jhutty; (penalty scored) Plavisc; (penalty scored) Visintin; (penalty scored) Cousens; (penalty missed) Adekugbe

=== Eastern Conference Championship ===
July 27, 2013	(Ontario) Ottawa Fury	3–2	(Pennsylvania) Reading United	Tennessee Avenue Soccer Complex; Ocean City, New Jersey
3:00pm EDT	Jones 27'; Rajkovic (yellow card) 33'; Barron (yellow card) 50'; Foster (yellow card) 60'; Haworth 75', 86' (pen.)	Report	Dacres 16'; Lowe (yellow card) 48'; Madison (yellow card) 60'; Pinto 71'	Attendance: 130

July 27, 2013	(New Jersey) Ocean City Nor'easters	0–0 (a.e.t.) (5–3 p)	(North Carolina) Carolina Dynamo	Tennessee Avenue Soccer Complex; Ocean City, New Jersey
5:00pm EDT	O'Neil (yellow card) 6'; Dennis (yellow card) 43'; Israel (red card) 69'	Report; Report	Campbell (yellow card) 29'; Martinez (yellow card) 72'; Durand (yellow card) 111'; Smith (yellow card) 114'	Attendance: 456; Referee: Kris Larwa
	Penalties
	Reid (penalty scored); Curran (penalty scored); Tribbett (penalty scored); Dennis (penalty scored); Kollie (penalty scored)		(penalty scored) Mahdi; (penalty scored) Ilhan; (penalty missed) Fender; (penalty scored) Smith

July 28, 2013	(New Jersey) Ocean City Nor'easters	3–1	(Ontario) Ottawa Fury	Carey Stadium; Ocean City, New Jersey
7:00pm EDT	Reid 14'; Tweneboa 30'; Tassano 42'	Report	Haworth 45+'	Attendance: 752

=== Central Conference Championship ===
July 27, 2013	(Ontario) Thunder Bay Chill	1–0	Michigan Bucks	Chapples Park Stadium; Thunder Bay, Ontario
3:00pm EDT	Omoregie 38'; Villon (yellow card) 67'; Campano-Franco (yellow card) 90'	Report		Attendance: 1,522; Referee: Justin Tasev

July 27, 2013	(Ontario) Forest City London	0–0 (a.e.t.) (4–3 p)	Real Colorado Foxes	Chapples Park Stadium; Thunder Bay, Ontario
6:00pm EDT	Johnson (yellow card) 82'; Beresford (yellow card) 90+'	Report		Referee: Michael Stenbring
	Penalties
	Penalty missed Penalty scored		Penalty scored Penalty missed

July 28, 2013	(Ontario) Thunder Bay Chill	3–0	(Ontario) Forest City London	Chapples Park Stadium; Thunder Bay, Ontario
6:00pm EDT	Campano 35' (yellow card) 69'; Dillon 41'; Omoregie 84'	Report	Boyd (yellow card) 90'	Attendance: 2,048; Referee: Justin Taser

=== Southern Conference Championship ===
July 26, 2013	(Florida) Ocala Stampede	0–2	(Texas) Laredo Heat	House Park; Austin, Texas
5:00pm CDT	Hogg (red card) 50'; Gourlay (yellow card) 89'	Report	Hernandez (yellow card) 40'; Ibarra 72' (pen.); Monteiro 90+1'	Referee: Elie Aguilar

July 26, 2013	(Texas) Austin Aztex	4–0	(Florida) Panama City Beach Pirates	House Park; Austin, Texas
7:30pm CDT	Seoane 9'; Shelton 37'; Cuero 51'; Cruz 88'	Report	D. Russell (yellow card) 28'; Saye (yellow card) 55'	Attendance: 2,481; Referee: Hayden Edwards

July 27, 2013	(Texas) Austin Aztex	2–0	(Texas) Laredo Heat	House Park; Austin, Texas
7:30pm CDT	Seoane 25' (yellow card) 52'; Shelton 86'	Report	Hernandez (yellow card) 52'; Souza (yellow card) 53'	Attendance: 2,673; Referee: Leszek Stalmach

=== Western Conference Championship ===
July 27, 2013	(California) Ventura County Fusion	2–3 (a.e.t.)	(British Columbia) Victoria Highlanders	Ventura College; Ventura, California
5:00pm PDT	Chongo 8'; Mirković (yellow card) 58'; Lopez 44'; Schmetz (yellow card) 85'; Kiffe (yellow card) 118'	Report	O'Neill 22' (pen.) (yellow card) 58'; Bhandal (yellow card) 55'; Levis 66', 96'; Ravenhill (yellow card) 76'; Mitrou (yellow card) 88'	Attendance: 782; Referee: Manuel Torres

July 27, 2013	(California) Fresno Fuego	1–1 (a.e.t.) (3–4 p)	(Oregon) Portland Timbers U23s	Ventura College; Ventura, California
7:30pm PDT	Edmonds (yellow card) 43'; Hewett 79'; Murphy (yellow card) 85'; Sanchez (yellow card) 104'	Report; Box score	Greer (yellow card) 22'; Reinhart 77'; McFarlin (yellow card) 106'	Attendance: 150
	Penalties
	Penalty scored Penalty missed		Penalty scored Penalty missed

July 28, 2013	(British Columbia) Victoria Highlanders	1–0	(Oregon) Portland Timbers U23s	Ventura College; Ventura, California
5:00pm PDT	Levis 16'; Sturrock (yellow card) 90'	Report; Report		Attendance: 50; Referee: Robert Sarfaraz

== Playoff Bracket ==
Conference Semifinals (July 26–27)
MS1	Austin Aztex	4
SE2	Panama City Beach Pirates	0
Southern Conference
SE1	Ocala Stampede	0
MS2	Laredo Heat	2
NE1	Ottawa Fury	3
MA3	Reading United	2
Eastern Conference
MA1	Ocean City Nor'easters (PEN)	0 (5)
SA1	Carolina Dynamo	0 (3)
NW1	Victoria Highlanders (AET)	3
SW2	Ventura County Fusion	2
Western Conference
SW1	Fresno Fuego	1 (3)
NW2	Portland Timbers U23s (PEN)	1 (4)
GL1	Forest City London (PEN)	0 (4)
HL2	Real Colorado Foxes	0 (3)
Central Conference
HL1	Thunder Bay Chill	1
GL2	Michigan Bucks	0

Conference Finals (July 27–28)
MS1	Austin Aztex	2
MS2	Laredo Heat	0
NE1	Ottawa Fury	1
MA1	Ocean City Nor'easters	3
NW1	Victoria Highlanders	1
NW2	Portland Timbers U23s	0
GL1	Forest City London	0
HL1	Thunder Bay Chill	3

Semi-Finals (August 2)
MS1	Austin Aztex	1
MA1	Ocean City Nor'easters	0
HL1	Thunder Bay Chill	2
NW1	Victoria Highlanders	0

Championship (August 4)
MS1	Austin Aztex	3
HL1	Thunder Bay Chill	1

== PDL Championship ==
=== Semi-finals ===
August 2, 2013	(Ontario) Thunder Bay Chill	2–0	(British Columbia) Victoria Highlanders	House Park; Austin, Texas
5:00pm CDT	Campano-Franco 55'; Silva 90+'	Report; Report		Referee: Jason Anno

August 2, 2013	(Texas) Austin Aztex	1–0	(New Jersey) Ocean City Nor'easters	House Park; Austin, Texas
7:30pm CDT	Seoane 52' (yellow card) 69'; Rocha (yellow card) 76'	Report; Report	Curran (yellow card) 33'; Umar (yellow card) 44'	Attendance: 3,062; Referee: Christopher Mercado

=== Championship ===
August 4, 2013	(Texas) Austin Aztex	3–1	(Ontario) Thunder Bay Chill	House Park; Austin, Texas
7:30pm CDT	Seoane 7' (pen.) 22'; Pope (yellow card) 11'; Shelton 45+'; Cortes (yellow card) 89'	Report; Report	Adan 2'; Paterson (red card) 7'; Intermoia (yellow card) 51'; Villon (yellow card) 82'	Attendance: 4,253; Referee: Hayden Edwards

Championship MVP: (United States) Sito Seoane (AUS)

== Awards ==
- Most Valuable Player: (United States) Kris Tyrpak, (AUS)
- Young (U21) Player of the Year: (United States) Pete Caringi (BAL)
- Coach of the Year: (Scotland) Paul Dalglish, (AUS)
- Goalkeeper of the Year: (Canada) Chad Bush, (OTT)

== All-League and All-Conference Teams ==
=== Eastern Conference ===
F: (United States) Pete Caringi (BAL) *, (Canada) Carl Haworth (OTT) *, (United States) Dwayne Reid (OCN)
M: (United States) Brandt Bronico (CAR), (Mexico) Brayan Martinez (JER), (Germany) Jason Plumhoff (REA) *
D: (England) Shaun Foster (OTT), (Jamaica) Damion Lowe (REA) *, (Rwanda) Gilbert Manier (GPP), (United States) Hugh Roberts (BAL)
G: (Canada) Chad Bush (OTT) *

=== Central Conference ===
F: (Canada) Moses Danto (WSA), (England) Oliver Gore (RCO), (United States) Zach Steinberger (MIB)
M: (United States) Bryan Ciesiulka (CHI), (United States) Jordan Green (KCB), (United States) Matt Walker (MIB)
D: (United States) Brandon Fricke (DSM) *, (Canada) Tyler Hemming (LON), (United States) Nolan Intermoia (THU), (Sweden) Axel Sjöberg (THU) *
G: (Canada) Tyson Farago (WSA)

=== Western Conference ===
F: (Canada) Niall Cousens (VAN), (Canada) Brett Levis (VIC), (United States) Tyler Reinhart (FRE)
M: (United States) Zach Barnes (POR), (United States) Paul Islas (FRE) *, (Canada) Bobby Jhutty (VAN) *
D: (Canada) Derrick Bassi (VAN), (United States) Chris Brundage (SEA), (Canada) Tyler Hughes (VIC), (United States) Trevor Spurgeon (FRE)
G: (United States) David Meves (POR)

=== Southern Conference ===
F: (England) Adam Black (OKC), (England) Tyler Blackwood (ORL), (United States) Kris Tyrpak (AUS) *
M: (Nigeria) Itode Fubara (ORL), (United States) Jack McVey (TAM), (Belize) Tony Rocha (AUS)
D: (Brazil) Taian de Souza (PAN) *, (United States) Max Gunderson (AUS), (United States) Walter Kromholz (HOU), (Brazil) Felipe Souza (LAR)
G: (United States) Devin Cook (AUS)

* denotes All-League player

== See also ==
- 2013 Vancouver Whitecaps FC season
