= Romain Gall =

American soccer player (born 1995)

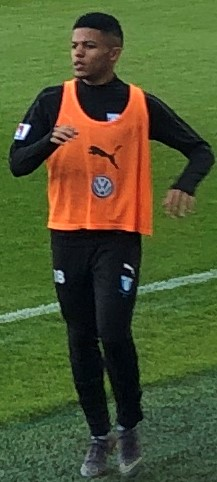
- Gall warming up for Malmö in 2019

Personal information
- Full name: Romain Gall
- Date of birth: January 31, 1995 (age 31)
- Place of birth: Paris, France
- Height: 1.76 m (5 ft 9 in)
- Positions: Winger; attacking midfielder

Youth career
- –2009: Herndon
- 2009–2010: D.C. United
- 2010–2011: Real Salt Lake
- 2011–2014: Lorient

Senior career*
Years	Team	Apps	(Gls)
2013–2014	Lorient II	7	(1)
2014–2015	Columbus Crew SC	3	(0)
2015	→ Austin Aztex (loan)	12	(3)
2016	Nyköpings BIS	24	(9)
2017–2018	GIF Sundsvall	37	(9)
2018–2022	Malmö FF	31	(7)
2020	→ Stabæk (loan)	10	(0)
2020	→ Örebro SK (loan)	8	(0)
2021	→ Örebro SK (loan)	11	(0)
2023	Mladost Novi Sad	7	(1)
2023–2024	Rot-Weiß Erfurt	19	(2)
2026	Sarasota Paradise	9	(3)

International career^{‡}
2013	United States U18	4	(4)
2014–2015	United States U20	25	(13)
2018	United States	1	(0)
- * Club domestic league appearances and goals as of November 2, 2026 ‡ National team caps and goals as of November 20, 2018

Romain Gall (/ˈroʊmən ɡɔːl/ ROH-mən GAWL; born January 31, 1995) is a professional soccer player who plays as a winger or attacking Midfielder most recently for Sarasota Paradise in the USL League One. Born in France, he has played for the United States national team.

== Youth ==
Gall was born in Paris, France, to a French father and a Senegalese mother. Gall moved to the United States with his family at the age of seven. The family settled in Herndon, Virginia, and Gall received his U.S. citizenship at fifteen.

Gall played for the academy teams of D.C. United and Real Salt Lake before joining the academy of FC Lorient in 2011. Ranked as the No. 2 recruit in his class, he committed to playing college soccer for the University of Maryland, but instead opted to play with the reserves at Lorient.

== Club career ==
Gall signed with Major League Soccer in August 2014 and was allocated to the Columbus Crew via a weighted lottery. He made his professional debut in a 3–0 victory over the Houston Dynamo on August 23. He was loaned to the Austin Aztex in the United Soccer League, wearing the number 9. Gall was waived by Columbus in February 2016.

On March 31, 2016, Gall joined Nyköpings BIS in the Tier 3 Division 1 Norra in Sweden. After one season in Nyköping, Gall caught the eye of Allsvenskan club GIF Sundsvall, who signed him to a three-year contract. Gall made 24 league appearances in his first season with Sundsvall. After a breakout performance in the spring of 2018, where he scored 7 goals in 13 appearances from a midfield position, Gall secured a move to Allsvenskan powerhouse Malmö FF halfway through the season.

In January 2023, Gall joined Serbian SuperLiga club Mladost Novi Sad.

In September 2023, Gall signed for Regionalliga Nordost (German 4th tier) club Rot-Weiß Erfurt.

After being a free agent for over two years, Gall returned to the United States to sign a deal with USL League One side Sarasota Paradise until the end of the season.

== International career ==
Gall was called up to the United States national team on November 6, 2018, for friendly matches against England and Italy. Gall made his international debut for the United States against Italy in a 0–1 loss on November 20, 2018, coming on as a replacement for Christian Pulisic in the 83rd minute.

== Personal life ==
Hobbies regarding hip hop and R&B, in his free time Gall makes music on his computer.

== Career statistics ==
=== Club ===
As of July 12, 2022

Club	Season	League			Cup (Note: Includes the U.S. Open Cup and Svenska Cupen)		Continental		Other		Total	
Club	Season	Division	Apps	Goals	Apps	Goals	Apps	Goals	Apps	Goals	Apps	Goals
Lorient II	2012–13	CFA	1	0	—		—		—		1	0
Lorient II	2013–14	CFA 2	6	1	—		—		—		6	1
Lorient II	Total		7	1	0	0	0	0	0	0	7	1
Columbus Crew SC	2014	MLS	3	0	0	0	—		0	0	3	0
Columbus Crew SC	2015	MLS	0	0	1	0	—		0	0	1	0
Columbus Crew SC	Total		3	0	1	0	0	0	0	0	4	0
Austin Aztex (loan)	2015	USL	12	3	0	0	—		—		12	3
Nyköpings BIS	2016	Division 1	24	9	2	3	—		—		26	12
GIF Sundsvall	2017	Allsvenskan	24	2	0	0	—		—		24	2
GIF Sundsvall	2018	Allsvenskan	13	7	3	2	—		—		16	9
GIF Sundsvall	Total		37	9	3	2	0	0	0	0	40	11
Malmö FF	2018	Allsvenskan	12	6	1	0	5 (Note: Two appearances in the UEFA Champions League, three appearances in the UEFA Europa League)	0	—		18	6
Malmö FF	2019	Allsvenskan	16	1	4	1	6 (Note: Appearances in the UEFA Europa League)	1	—		26	3
Malmö FF	2020	Allsvenskan	0	0	1	1	0	0	—		1	1
Malmö FF	2021	Allsvenskan	0	0	0	0	0	0	—		0	0
Malmö FF	2022	Allsvenskan	1	0	1	0	0	0	—		2	0
Malmö FF	Total		29	7	7	2	11	1	0	0	47	10
Stabæk (loan)	2020	Eliteserien	10	0	0	0	—		—		10	0
Örebro SK (loan)	2020	Allsvenskan	8	0	1	0	—		—		9	0
Örebro SK (loan)	2021	Allsvenskan	11	0	0	0	—		—		11	0
Örebro SK (loan)	Total		19	0	1	0	0	0	0	0	20	0
Mladost Novi Sad	2022–23	Serbian SuperLiga	7	1	0	0	—		—		7	1
Career total			148	30	14	7	11	1	0	0	173	38

=== International ===
Appearances and goals by national team and year
National team	Year	Apps	Goals
United States	2018	1	0
Total		1	0

== Honors ==
Malmö FF

- Svenska Cupen: 2021–22
