= Trevin Caesar =

Trinidadian footballer (born 1989)

Personal information
- Full name: Trevin Shonari Caesar
- Date of birth: 26 April 1989 (age 37)
- Place of birth: Lambeau, Trinidad and Tobago
- Height: 5 ft 7 in (1.70 m)
- Position: Forward

Team information
- Current team: Club Sando

Senior career*
Years	Team	Apps	(Gls)
2010–2011	Ma Pau		
2011–2013	Caledonia AIA		
2013–2014	North East Stars		
2014	San Antonio Scorpions	12	(2)
2015	Austin Aztex	27	(9)
2016	Orange County Blues	26	(10)
2017	Sacramento Republic	27	(7)
2018	Svay Rieng		
2018–2019	Gjilani	12	(3)
2019–	Club Sando		

International career
2013–2017	Trinidad and Tobago	15	(3)
- * Club domestic league appearances and goals as of 11:41, 14 July 2020 (UTC)

Trevin Shonari Caesar (born 26 April 1989) is a Trinidad and Tobago footballer who plays as a forward for Club Sando. He made 15 appearances for the Trinidad and Tobago national team scoring three goals.

== Club career ==
Caesar has played club football for Ma Pau, Caledonia AIA and North East Stars. In July 2014 he signed a one-year contract with the San Antonio Scorpions of the NASL.

After a season with United Soccer League side Austin Aztex in 2015, Caesar moved to USL's Orange County Blues on 13 January 2016. He spent the 2017 season with Sacramento Republic. He signed for Cambodian club Svay Rieng in March 2018.

Caesar joined SC Gjilani in August 2018. He played there until 1 February 2019, where it was announced, that he had left the club. He returned to Trinidad with Club Sando.

== International career ==
Caesar made his international debut for Trinidad and Tobago in 2013.

== Career statistics ==
Scores and results list Trinidad and Tobago's goal tally first.

No	Date	Venue	Opponent	Score	Result	Competition
1.	8 October 2014	Ato Boldon Stadium, Couva, Trinidad and Tobago	Dominican Republic	6–0	6–1	2014 Caribbean Cup qualification
2.	29 March 2016	Hasely Crawford Stadium, Port of Spain, Trinidad and Tobago	Saint Vincent and the Grenadines	5–0	6–0	2018 FIFA World Cup qualification
3.	29 March 2016	Hasely Crawford Stadium, Port of Spain, Trinidad and Tobago	Saint Vincent and the Grenadines	5–0	6–0	2018 FIFA World Cup qualification
