= Guaraci (footballer) =

Brazilian footballer (born 1992)

Personal information
- Full name: Guaraci Francisco de Oliveira Filho
- Date of birth: March 2, 1992 (age 34)
- Place of birth: Sorocaba, Brazil
- Height: 6 ft 2 in (1.88 m)
- Position: Midfielder

Senior career*
Years	Team	Apps	(Gls)
2010	Rio Branco-SP	3	(0)
2011–2013	Coritiba	0	(0)
2012	→ Toledo (loan)	1	(0)
2013	→ Madureira (loan)	14	(0)
2014	Duque de Caxias	3	(0)
2014	Guaratinguetá	7	(0)
2015	Austin Aztex	18	(1)
2017	CRAC	3	(0)
- * Club domestic league appearances and goals as of June 3, 2017 ‡ National team caps and goals as of October 13, 2011

Guaraci Francisco de Oliveira Filho (Sorocaba, March 2, 1992), known as just Guaraci, is a Brazilian soccer player. He is a defensive midfielder and currently plays in Coritiba.

== Career ==
=== Youth Teams ===
==== Atlético-PR ====
In 2008, Guaraci plays in U-17 in Atlético-PR.

==== Rio Branco-SP ====
In 2010, he was hired for the youth team (U-20) by Rio Branco of São Paulo. But, then, he was hired by Corinthians.

==== Corinthians ====
Like Rio Branco-SP, he is in Corinthians for much short, in same year he was hired by Coritiba.

==== Coritiba ====
In Coritiba, he finished the year of 2010 like a Youth Team player of Coritiba.

=== Professional ===
==== Coritiba ====
His professional debut was in 2011 for Coritiba. He stayed for some matches as a reserve. But, then, he was loaned to Toledo.

==== Toledo ====
Guaraci spent 2012 playing for Toledo. The loan finished at the end of December 2012, and he returned to Coritiba in 2013.
