= Devin Perales =

American soccer player (born 1993)

Devin Cook-Perales
Personal information
- Date of birth: April 15, 1993 (age 33)
- Place of birth: Simi Valley, California, United States
- Height: 6 ft 2 in (1.88 m)
- Position: Goalkeeper

Youth career
- 2008–2011: Lonestar SC

College career
Years	Team	Apps	(Gls)
2011–2012	SMU Mustangs	2	(0)
2013–2014	Coastal Carolina Chaticleers	43	(0)

Senior career*
Years	Team	Apps	(Gls)
2012–2014	Austin Aztex (PDL)	34	(0)
2015	Austin Aztex	16	(0)
2016	Rio Grande Valley FC Toros	8	(0)
- * Club domestic league appearances and goals as of September 26, 2016

Devin Perales (born April 15, 1993) is an American former soccer player.

== Career ==
=== Youth ===
Perales, originally from Simi Valley California, moved to Round Rock, Texas when he was 8 years old and attended high school at Stony Point High School from 2008 to 2011. During his high school career, Perales lettered in both soccer and football, as a kicker. For his high school, Perales mainly played forward for the varsity soccer team and occasionally would step in between the posts as the goalkeeper when needed. Perales was named First Team All-District as a goalkeeper his freshman year, First Team All-District as a goalkeeper and First Team All-District as a forward in his sophomore Year (receiving honors in 2 position in 1 single season had never been done before in the history of the District), and he was named First Team All-District as a forward his senior year after breaking the school record for most goals in a season with 23.

During his high school career, Perales also played club soccer for Lonestar SC as a goalkeeper in the USSF Development Academy. During those four years, Perales was named an ESPN Rising Star, was an Adidas ESP participant, invited to and played in the 2010 New York Red Bull Cup, and was ranked as one of the top 100 players nationally and one of the top 10 players in Texas by TopDrawerSoccer.com.

Perales has been a member of the US U14 National Team and was a member of the Region III and Texas State ODP teams.

=== College/Professional Development League (PDL) ===
In 2011 and 2012 Perales attended Southern Methodist University in Dallas Texas. As a freshman, Perales played in two games, including his first collegiate start against No. 13 William & Mary as a freshman and did not see any action in 2012 retaining a year of eligibility.

In 2012 Perales came back to Austin, Texas and joined the Austin Aztex PDL Team. When the starting goalkeeper Michael Lisch was injured, Perales took over the starting position playing the remaining 8 games of the season and finishing with a 0.415 Goals Against Average (GAA).

In 2013, Perales transferred to Coastal Carolina University (CCU) and had a big year. Perales started as goalkeeper in 23 of 24 matches played, finishing the season with a record of 18–5–0 and a goals against average of 0.80 in 2,129 minutes between the posts and assisted CCU in winning the Big South Conference. In the fall of 2014, Perales finished his final season of college soccer with Coastal Carolina University. Perales started as goalkeeper in 17 of 23 matches played, finishing the season with a record of 12–5–1 and a goals against average of 0.94 in 1,725 minutes between the posts. During Perales' 2 seasons at CCU, he set several records and received many honors:

(2013) First Team All-Big South; (2014) Honorable Mention All Big South; (2013) CCU single season record for shutouts with 12; (2013) CCU single season records for matches played (24) matches started (23) and minutes played (2,129); (2013/2014) CCU career record for shutouts with 18.1; (2013) 4th in CCU single season record for Goals Against Average with 0.80; (2014) 10th in CCU single season record for Goals Against Average with 0.94; (2013/2014) 4th in CCU career record for Fewest Goals Allowed; (2014) 10th in CCU single season record for shutouts with 6.1; (2014) 32nd in the NCAA with a 0.80 Goals Against Average, while leading Coastal to a 0.50 shutout percentage which ranked 11th-best in the nation; (2013) logged two (2) three-game shutout streaks during the fall, notched clean sheets against Presbyterian (Sept. 17), No. 5 VCU (Sept. 21) and Gardner-Webb (Sept. 2) in consecutive fashion, then did so again against Liberty (Nov. 17), East Tennessee State (Nov. 21) and No.16 Charlotte (Nov. 24); (2013) recorded a season-high nine saves against California University at Berkeley in the third round of the NCAA Tournament; and (2014) named to the College Soccer News National Team of the Week and Big South Conference Defensive Player of the Week following a four save effort in CCU's 1–0 win at No. 5 VCU

In the summer of 2013 Perales again came back to Austin Texas and was the starting goalkeeper for the PDL's Austin Aztex's. Perales played in 17 of 18 matches and had an astounding 0.369 Goals Against Average (GAA) and 11 shutouts on the season to help the Aztex's finish the season with a record of 15–1–2 overall. That season the Austin Aztexs won the Mid-South Conference, the Southern Conference Championships and the 2013 PDL National Championship. Perales was named as one of three finalist for the PDL's Goalkeeper of the Year and Young (U21) Player of the Year, he was named PDL All-Conference Goalkeeper (Southern Conference) and the Austin Aztex's Defensive Player of the Year. In 2014, Perales again played for the Austin Aztex PDL club. Perales played in 13 out of 14 matches and had a 0.846 Goals Against Average (GAA) with 3 shutouts on the season to help the Aztexs clinch another Mid-Southern Conference Championships. Perales was named PDL All-Conference Goalkeeper (Southern Conference) and the Austin Aztex's Most Valuable Player.

=== Professional ===
The Aztex moved to the professional USL in 2015 and signed Perales prior to the season.

After the Aztex went on hiatus, Perales signed for Rio Grande Valley FC Toros at the start of 2016. He was released from Rio Grande Valley in November, 2016.
