= Tony Rocha =

Belizean footballer (born 1993)

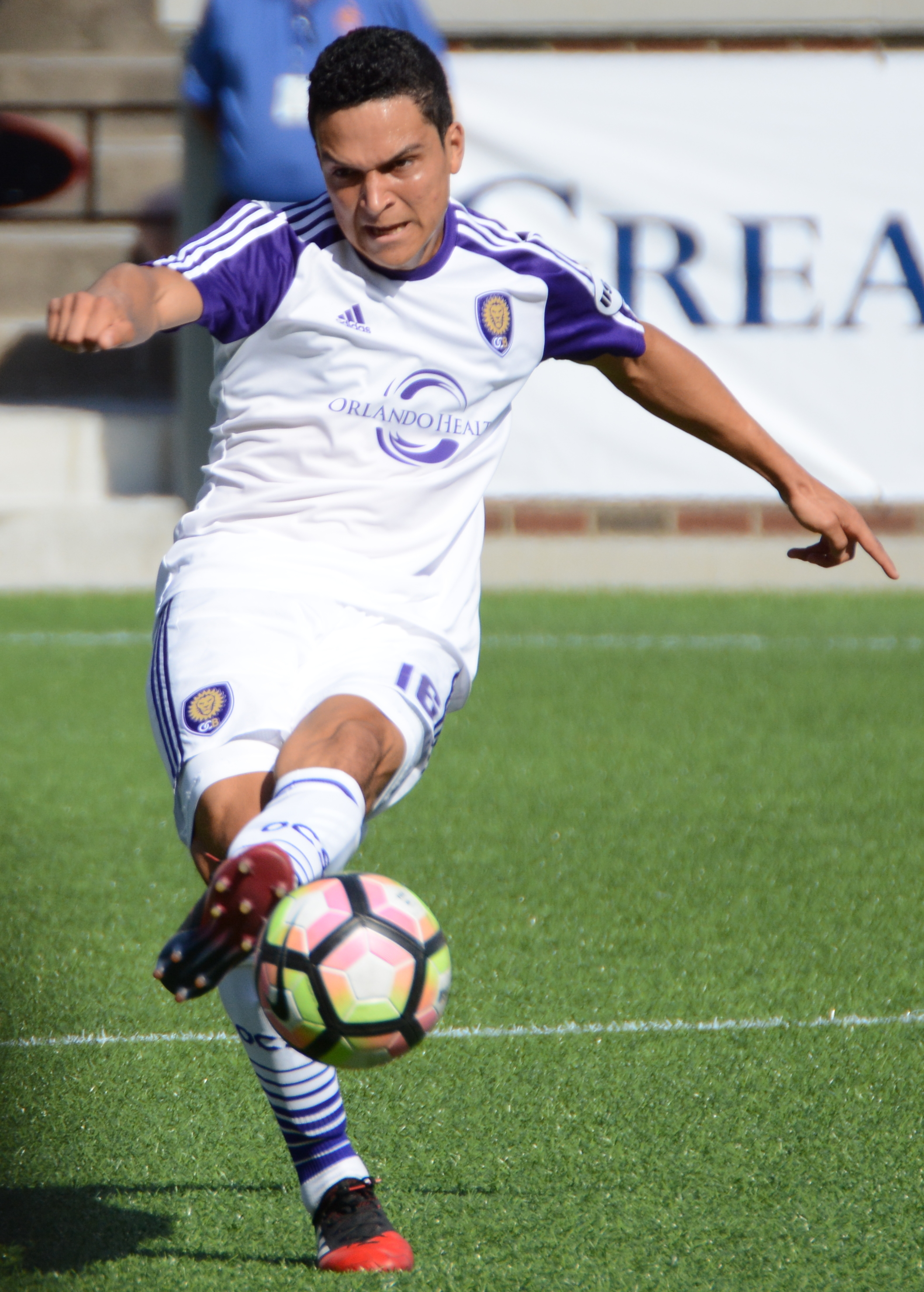
- Rocha playing for Orlando City in 2017

Personal information
- Full name: Antonio Rocha
- Date of birth: 21 August 1993 (age 33)
- Place of birth: Spring, Texas, U.S.
- Height: 1.75 m (5 ft 9 in)
- Position: Midfielder

College career
Years	Team	Apps	(Gls)
2011–2014	Tulsa Golden Hurricane	76	(7)

Senior career*
Years	Team	Apps	(Gls)
2012–2013	Austin Aztex	7	(3)
2014	Tulsa Athletic	4	(2)
2015	Austin Aztex	25	(1)
2016	Orlando City B	19	(1)
2016–2018	Orlando City	23	(0)
2017	→ Orlando City B	14	(0)
2018	→ Saint Louis FC (loan)	2	(0)
2019–2021	New York City	33	(1)
2022	Orange County SC	20	(0)

International career^{‡}
2019–2022	Belize	4	(0)
- * Club domestic league appearances and goals as of 14:43, 23 October 2022 (UTC) ‡ National team caps and goals as of 03:14, 3 June 2022 (UTC)

Antonio Rocha (born 21 August 1993) is a former professional footballer who played as a midfielder. Born in the United States, he represented Belize at international level.

== Early life ==
Rocha played college soccer at the University of Tulsa from 2011 to 2014. For the 2011 season, Rocha was named as the Conference USA Men's Soccer Freshman of the Year. He was selected to the All-Conference USA Third-Team in 2011, 2012, and 2013. In 2014, Rocha was a captain of the University of Tulsa men's soccer team and helped lead the team to a conference championship. Rocha was named to the All-Tournament Team for the 2014 American Athletic Conference Men's Soccer Tournament.

== Club career ==
=== Sporting Kansas City ===
Rocha was selected by Sporting Kansas City in the fourth round of the 2015 MLS SuperDraft. They cut him prior to the start of the season.

=== Austin Aztex ===
On 9 March 2015, Rocha signed with Austin Aztex for the 2015 USL season. This would be the team's final season before dissolving and Rocha was forced to find a new club.

=== Orlando City B ===
On 15 October 2015, Rocha became one of the first three players to sign with newly formed USL team Orlando City B along with Mikey Ambrose and Kyle Callan-McFadden.

=== Orlando City ===
==== 2016: Debut season ====
Rocha signed a short-term agreement with Orlando City on 15 June 2016 for a 2016 U.S. Open Cup match.

On 3 August 2016, Orlando City acquired Rocha's MLS rights from Sporting Kansas City in exchange for a fourth-round pick in the 2018 MLS SuperDraft and he was signed to an MLS contract the day after.

==== 2018: Loan to Saint Louis FC and departure ====
Rocha was loaned to Saint Louis FC on 6 April 2018. He returned to Orlando a week later having played twice. At the end of the season the club announced they had not picked up his contract option.

=== New York City FC ===
On 12 December 2018, Rocha had his rights acquired by New York City FC in exchange for a 2019 MLS SuperDraft fourth round pick. Rocha scored his first and only goal for the club on 25 October 2020 in a 3–1 win over Montreal Impact. Following the 2021 season, New York City opted to decline their contract option on Rocha.

=== Orange County SC ===
On 18 February 2022, Rocha signed with USL Championship side Orange County SC.

== International career ==
=== Belize ===
==== 2019: Debut and CONCACAF Nations League ====
In September 2019, Rocha was called into Belize for its CONCACAF Nations League matches against French Guiana and Grenada. He made his international debut on 8 September 2019 in Belize's 2–1 loss to Grenada.

==== 2022: Return ====
On 2 June 2022, Rocha returned to Belize for the 2022–23 CONCACAF Nations League. He would play in the first match of Group B against the Dominican Republic, in which would end in a 2–0 defeat. This was Rocha's final game for the team.

== Career statistics ==
=== Club ===
As of match played 21 November 2020

Appearances and goals by club, season and competition
Club	Season	League			Domestic Cup		Continental		Other		Total	
Club	Season	Division	Apps	Goals	Apps	Goals	Apps	Goals	Apps	Goals	Apps	Goals
Austin Aztex	2012	PDL	7	3	0	0	–		–		7	3
Tulsa Athletic	2014	NPSL	4	2	–		–		–		4	2
Austin Aztex	2015	USL	25	1	1	0	–		–		26	1
Austin Aztex	Total		32	4	1	0	0	0	0	0	33	4
Orlando City	2016	MLS	8	0	2	0	–		–		10	0
Orlando City	2017	MLS	3	0	0	0	–		–		3	0
Orlando City	2018	MLS	12	0	1	0	–		–		13	0
Orlando City	Total		23	0	3	0	0	0	0	0	26	0
Orlando City B	2016	USL	19	1	–		–		–		19	1
Orlando City B	2017	USL	14	0	–		–		–		14	0
Orlando City B	Total		33	1	0	0	0	0	0	0	33	1
Saint Louis FC (loan)	2018	USL	2	0	–		–		–		2	0
New York City	2019	MLS	17	1	1	0	–		0	0	18	1
New York City	2020	MLS	11	100	–		1 (Note: Appearance(s) in CONCACAF Champions League)	0	1 (Note: Appearance(s) in MLS Cup Playoffs)	0	13	0
New York City	Total		28	1	1	0	1	0	1	0	31	1
Career total			122	8	5	0	1	0	1	0	129	8

=== International ===
As of match played 3 June 2022

Appearances and goals by national team and year
National team	Year	Apps	Goals
Belize	2019	3	0
2022	1	0	
Total		4	0

== Honors ==
New York City FC

- MLS Cup: 2021

2023 EDP u16 Northeast Division Champion (as coach)

2026 Ct State Cup finalist (as coach)
