= Brendan King =

American soccer player

Personal information
- Date of birth: February 25, 1990 (age 36)
- Place of birth: Naperville, Illinois, United States
- Height: 6 ft 0 in (1.83 m)
- Position: Midfielder

Youth career
- 2006–2007: IMG Academy
- 2007–2008: Chicago Magic
- 2008–2011: Notre Dame Fighting Irish

Senior career*
Years	Team	Apps	(Gls)
2008–2012	Chicago Fire U-23	21	(2)
2012	Bray Wanderers	1	(0)
2012	Alta IF	7	(0)
2013	Chicago Fire	0	(0)
2015	Austin Aztex	22	(1)

International career
2007	United States U17	1	(0)
- * Club domestic league appearances and goals as of November 23, 2015

Brendan King (born February 25, 1990) is an American soccer player.

== Career ==
=== College & Youth ===
King played four years of college soccer at the University of Notre Dame between 2008 and 2011. While at college, King also appeared for USL PDL club Chicago Fire U-23.

=== Professional ===
On January 12, 2012, King was drafted in the second round (27th overall) of the 2012 MLS SuperDraft by Portland Timbers. However, he didn't sign with Portland, instead opting to sign with Irish club Bray Wanderers on July 5, 2012.

After spending time with Norwegian club Alta IF in 2012, King moved back to the United States when he signed with MLS side Chicago Fire on January 31, 2013. He was waived by Chicago on February 20, 2014, without making a first team appearance.

After almost year out of contract, King signed with USL club Austin Aztex on December 18, 2014.
