= Felipe Souza =

Felipe Souza may refer to:

- Felipe Souza (footballer, born 1991), Brazilian football midfielder
- Felipe Souza (footballer, born 1998), Brazilian football forward

== See also ==
- Felipe Sousa (born 1999), Brazilian football forward
