= Bryce Taylor (soccer) =

American soccer player (born 1989)

Personal information
- Full name: Bryce Taylor
- Date of birth: March 19, 1989 (age 37)
- Place of birth: Broken Arrow, Oklahoma, United States
- Height: 6 ft 2 in (1.88 m)
- Positions: Winger; forward

Youth career
- 2005–2007: Broken Arrow Tigers

College career
Years	Team	Apps	(Gls)
2007–2008	Rogers State Hillcats		
2009–2010	Midwestern State Mustangs		

Senior career*
Years	Team	Apps	(Gls)
2009–2010	DFW Tornados	25	(4)
2011	Mississippi Brilla	11	(1)
2012–2013	Wilmington Hammerheads	46	(6)
2013	Tulsa Revolution (indoor)	4	(1)
2015	Austin Aztex	5	(0)
2016	Wilmington Hammerheads	5	(0)
2016	Tulsa Roughnecks	16	(1)
- * Club domestic league appearances and goals as of October 4, 2016

Bryce Taylor (born March 19, 1989) is an American soccer player.

== Career ==
Taylor played college soccer at Rogers State University between 2007 and 2010. During his time at RSU, Taylor also played with USL Premier Development League club DFW Tornados between 2009 and 2010.

After leaving college, Taylor stayed in the USL Premier Development League, signing with Mississippi Brilla for the 2011 season.

Taylor signed his first professional contract with USL Pro club Wilmington Hammerheads in February 2012.

In October 2013, he joined the Tulsa Revolution of the Professional Arena Soccer League.

Taylor signed with USL Pro club Austin Aztex on January 19, 2015.

Taylor was widely known for his 2017 MVP when he played for the Tulsa Roughnecks. Scoring 34 goals in only 23 games. Still a record to this day.
