= Mikey Ambrose =

American soccer player

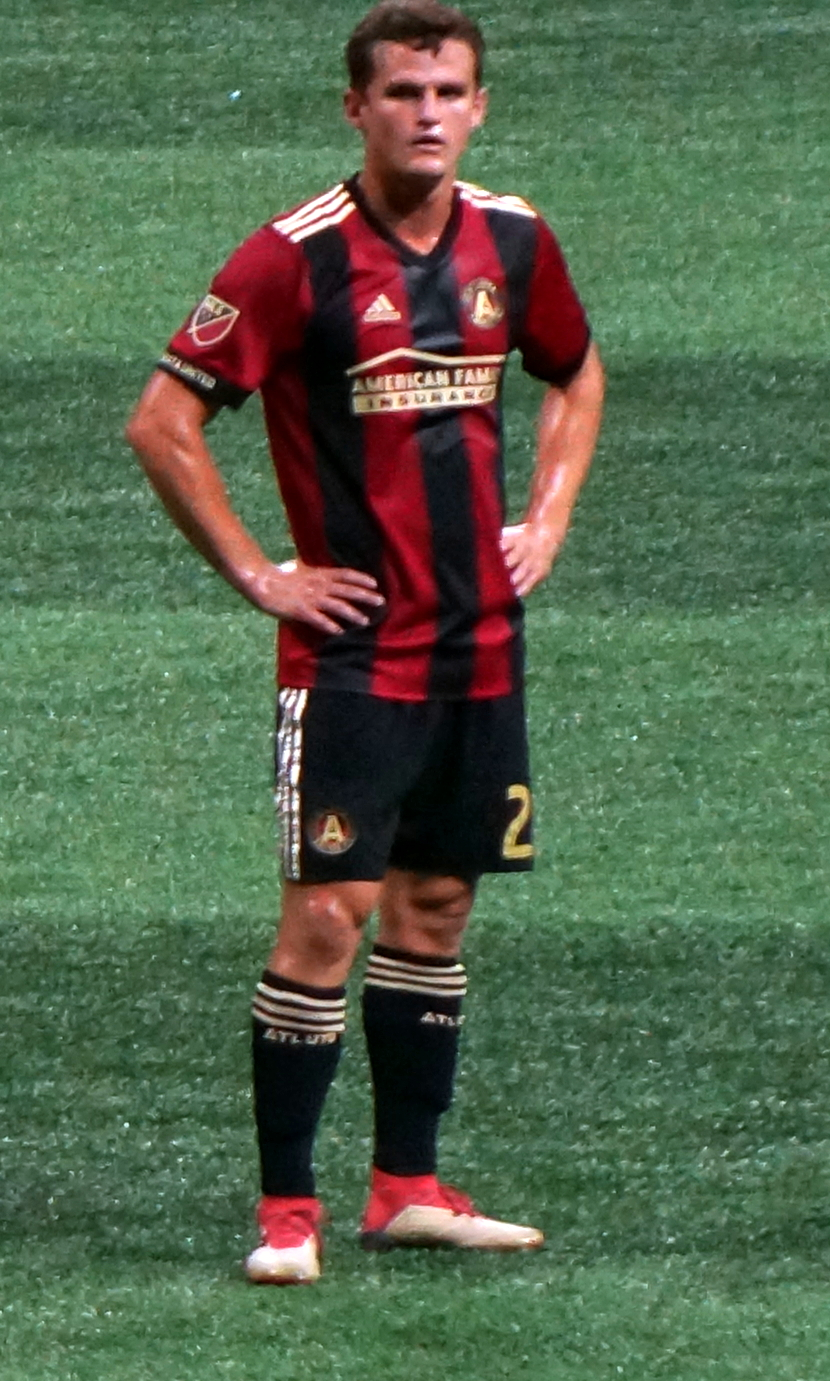
- Mikey Ambrose playing for Atlanta United in 2018

Personal information
- Full name: Michael Ambrose
- Date of birth: October 5, 1993 (age 33)
- Place of birth: El Paso, Texas, U.S.
- Height: 1.73 m (5 ft 8 in)
- Position: Defender

Youth career
- 2008–2009: IMG Soccer Academy
- 2009–2012: FC Dallas

College career
Years	Team	Apps	(Gls)
2012–2014	Maryland Terrapins	71	(1)

Senior career*
Years	Team	Apps	(Gls)
2013–2014	Austin Aztex	8	(1)
2015	Austin Aztex	26	(0)
2016	Orlando City B	18	(0)
2016	Orlando City	5	(0)
2017–2019	Atlanta United	20	(0)
2017	→ Charleston Battery (loan)	3	(0)
2018–2019	→ Atlanta United 2 (loan)	18	(3)
2020	Inter Miami	6	(1)
2021–2022	Atlanta United	6	(0)
2021–2022	→ Atlanta United 2 (loan)	17	(0)
2025	Des Moines Menace	0	(0)
Total		127	(5)

International career
2009	United States U17	3	(1)
2010	United States U18	3	(0)
2013	United States U20	1	(0)
- * Club domestic league appearances and goals

Michael Ambrose (born October 5, 1993) is an American former professional soccer player who played as a defender.

== Career ==
=== Early career ===
Ambrose spent four seasons with the FC Dallas Development Academy before signing a letter of intent to play college soccer at the University of Maryland. He made a total of 71 appearances for the Terrapins and tallied one goal and 15 assists.

Ambrose also played for the Austin Aztex while they were playing in the Premier Development League.

=== Professional ===
On January 14, 2015, Ambrose left college early to sign a professional contract with the Austin Aztex who moved up to the USL. He made his professional debut on March 28 in a 2–0 victory over the Colorado Springs Switchbacks.

In August 2016, Ambrose was traded by Dallas to Orlando City SC in exchange for a third-round pick in the 2018 MLS SuperDraft.

In December 2016, Ambrose was selected by expansion side Atlanta United FC in the 2016 MLS Expansion Draft.

In November 2019, Ambrose was selected by expansion side Inter Miami CF in the first stage of the 2019 MLS Re-Entry Draft. Miami opted to decline his contract option following the 2020 season.

On December 22, 2020, it was announced that Ambrose would re-join Atlanta United as a free agent ahead of their 2021 season. Ambrose's contract option was declined by Atlanta following the 2022 season.

=== International ===
Ambrose also has represented the United States in the U17, U18 and U20 level.

== Personal life ==
Ambrose is from El Paso, Texas. He has three siblings. Ambrose is a Christian.

== Career statistics ==
Appearances and goals by club, season and competition
Club	Season	League			National cup		League cup		Continental		Total	
Club	Season	Division	Apps	Goals	Apps	Goals	Apps	Goals	Apps	Goals	Apps	Goals
Austin Aztex	2015	USL PRO	26	0	2	1	—		—		28	1
Orlando City B	2016	USL PRO	18	0	—		—		—		18	0
Orlando City	2016	Major League Soccer	5	0	—		—		—		5	0
Atlanta United	2017	Major League Soccer	7	0	2	0	1 (Note: Appearance(s) in MLS Cup Playoffs)	0	—		10	0
Atlanta United	2018	Major League Soccer	9	0	1	0	0	0	—		10	0
Atlanta United	2019	Major League Soccer	4	0	1	0	1	0	2 (Note: Appearance(s) in CONCACAF Champions League)	0	8	0
Atlanta United	Total		20	0	4	0	2	0	2	0	28	0
Charleston Battery (loan)	2017	United Soccer League	3	0	—		—		—		3	0
Atlanta United 2 (loan)	2018	United Soccer League	6	2	—		—		—		6	2
Atlanta United 2 (loan)	2019	USL Championship	12	1	—		—		—		12	1
Atlanta United 2 (loan)	Total		18	3	0	0	0	0	0	0	18	3
Inter Miami	2020	Major League Soccer	6	1	—		1	0	—		7	1
Career total			96	4	6	1	3	0	2	0	107	5
