= David Mateos =

Spanish footballer

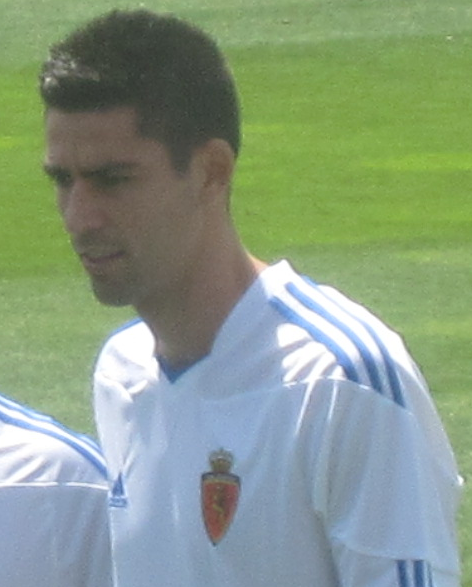
- Mateos being presented at Zaragoza

Personal information
- Full name: David Mateos Ramajo
- Date of birth: 22 April 1987 (age 39)
- Place of birth: Madrid, Spain
- Height: 1.90 m (6 ft 3 in)
- Position: Centre-back

Youth career
- 1999–2006: Real Madrid
- 2001–2002: → Santa Ana (loan)

Senior career*
Years	Team	Apps	(Gls)
2006–2007	Real Madrid C		
2007–2013	Real Madrid B	128	(3)
2010–2013	Real Madrid	0	(0)
2011	→ AEK Athens (loan)	10	(0)
2011–2012	→ Zaragoza (loan)	14	(0)
2013–2015	Ferencváros	40	(7)
2015–2016	Orlando City	27	(0)
2017–2018	Murcia	23	(1)
2018–2019	Hapoel Hadera	26	(1)
2019–2020	Hapoel Ra'anana	27	(1)
2020	Hapoel Umm al-Fahm	3	(0)
2021	The Strongest	14	(0)
2022–2023	Guangxi Pingguo Haliao	49	(3)
2024–2025	Móstoles	7	(0)
2025	Jiangxi Dingnan United	22	(0)

International career
2005	Spain U17	4	(1)
- * Club domestic league appearances and goals as of 21:14, 28 June 2026 (UTC)

David Mateos Ramajo (born 22 April 1987) is a Spanish professional footballer who plays as a central defender.

== Club career ==
=== Real Madrid ===
Born in Madrid, Mateos joined Real Madrid's youth system at the age of 12. In the 2007–08 season he made his senior debut, playing that and the following two years with the B team in the Segunda División B.

In late January 2010, Mateos was called to the main squad by Manuel Pellegrini for a La Liga match against Deportivo de La Coruña. On 3 April that year, he also made the final list for the game against Racing de Santander, but failed to leave the bench on either occasion.

During the 2010–11 pre-season, Real Madrid's first-team coach, José Mourinho, said:

It's a shame Mateos can't join us because I like him a lot. He defends well and knows how to instigate play from the back. That's a trait which we need here at Madrid. With the difficulties we have it is a pity that he can not play, I would like him to be part of the first team.

The coach's statements instigated Real Madrid to sign the player to a professional contract and, subsequently, Mateos was called for the first match of the campaign against Mallorca. After the departure of Rafael van der Vaart and Royston Drenthe, to Tottenham Hotspur and Hércules respectively, he was promoted to the first team, being awarded the number 15 shirt previously worn by the latter.

Mateos made his official debut for Real Madrid on 23 November 2010, playing ten minutes in the 4–0 away win over Ajax in the group stage of the UEFA Champions League; after the match, he said: "I will never forget this day." His last competitive appearance came the following 6 January when he started the 2–0 loss at Levante in the round of 16 of the Copa del Rey, with his side eventually claiming the trophy.

On 29 January 2011, AEK Athens signed Mateos on a six-month contract with the option of retaining the player for an extra year. In the summer, however, he moved to Real Zaragoza also on loan for one season, making his top-flight debut on 11 September in a 0–0 draw at Rayo Vallecano, but the spell was marred by injury.

In June 2012, Mateos accepted a return to Castilla for 2012–13, as the reserves had promoted to Segunda División after an absence of five years.

=== Ferencváros ===
On 2 September 2013, Mateos signed for Hungarian club Ferencváros. He scored two goals in 21 games in his first season, helping his team to third position.

=== Orlando City ===
On 29 July 2015, Mateos joined Orlando City of the Major League Soccer, with general manager Paul McDonough describing him as a "well-versed" player who he expected to "make an impact right away". He was waived on 3 March 2017.

=== Murcia ===
In August 2017, Mateos signed for Spanish third-tier Real Murcia. He scored his sole goal on 17 March 2018, opening an eventual 2–1 away defeat of Granada B.

=== Israel ===
Mateos then took is game to Israel. He represented in quick succession Hapoel Hadera and Hapoel Ra'anana (both in the Premier League), dropping down to the Liga Leumit with Hapoel Umm al-Fahm for 2020–21.

=== Later career ===
On 22 October 2021, Mateos joined The Strongest in the Bolivian Primera División. He switched to China League One ahead of the 2022 season, with newly promoted Guangxi Pingguo Haliao.

== Career statistics ==
As of 24 November 2022

Appearances and goals by club, season and competition
Club	Season	League			National Cup		League Cup		Continental		Total	
Club	Season	Division	Apps	Goals	Apps	Goals	Apps	Goals	Apps	Goals	Apps	Goals
Real Madrid B	2007–08	Segunda División B	34	1	–		–		–		34	1
Real Madrid B	2008–09	Segunda División B	30	0	–		–		–		30	0
Real Madrid B	2009–10	Segunda División B	33	1	–		–		–		33	1
Real Madrid B	2012–13	Segunda División	31	1	–		–		–		31	1
Real Madrid B	Total		128	3	–		–		–		128	3
Real Madrid	2010–11	La Liga	0	0	1	0	–		1	0	2	0
AEK Athens (loan)	2010–11	Super League Greece	10	0	2	0	–		0	0	12	0
Zaragoza (loan)	2011–12	La Liga	14	0	1	0	–		0	0	15	0
Ferencváros	2013–14	Nemzeti Bajnokság I	21	2	2	0	10	2	0	0	33	4
Ferencváros	2014–15	Nemzeti Bajnokság I	19	5	3	0	4	0	4	0	30	5
Ferencváros	2015–16	Nemzeti Bajnokság I	0	0	0	0	0	0	1	0	1	0
Ferencváros	Total		40	7	5	0	14	2	5	0	63	9
Orlando City	2015	Major League Soccer	6	0	0	0	–		–		6	0
Orlando City	2016	Major League Soccer	21	0	1	1	–		–		22	1
Orlando City	Total		27	0	1	1	–		–		28	1
Murcia	2017–18	Segunda División B	25	1	5	0	–		–		30	1
Hapoel Hadera	2018–19	Israeli Premier League	26	1	4	0	4	0	–		34	1
Hapoel Ra'anana	2019–20	Israeli Premier League	27	1	1	0	4	0	–		32	1
Hapoel Umm al-Fahm	2020–21	Liga Leumit	3	0	0	0	0	0	–		3	0
The Strongest	2021	Bolivian Primera División	14	0	0	0	–		3	0	17	0
Guangxi Pingguo Haliao	2022	China League One	23	2	0	0	–		–		23	2
Career total			337	12	25	1	22	2	8	0	392	15

== Honours ==
Real Madrid

- Copa del Rey: 2010–11

AEK Athens

- Greek Football Cup: 2010–11

Ferencváros

- Magyar Kupa: 2014–15
- Ligakupa: 2014–15
