= 2016 Orlando City SC season =

Orlando City SC
2016 season
- President: Phil Rawlins
- Manager: Adrian Heath; (until July 7); Bobby Murphy; (interim, June 7 – July 18); Jason Kreis; (from July 19)
- Stadium: Camping World Stadium
- MLS: Conference: 8th Overall: 15th
- MLS Playoffs: Did not qualify
- U.S. Open Cup: Round of 16
- Top goalscorer: League: Larin (14); All: Larin (14)
- Highest home attendance: 60,147; (Mar. 6 vs. Real Salt Lake)
- Lowest home attendance: League: 23,802 (August 24 vs. Toronto FC); All: 3,162 (Jun. 29 vs. Fort Lauderdale)
- Average home league attendance: League: 31,323; All:21,692
Home colors	Away colors

The 2016 Orlando City SC season was the club's sixth season of existence in Orlando, and second season in Major League Soccer, the top-flight league in the United States soccer league system.

== Background ==
On July 15, 2015, Orlando City opened an additional 4,000 seats for sale to potential season ticket holders, bringing the total available season tickets to 18,000. The extra allotment sold out on August 18, 2015. Season tickets are again sold out for the 2016 season.

On October 15, 2015, Orlando City announced that they would field an owned-and-operated team in the United Soccer League, Orlando City B. The team began play in the 2016 season at Eastern Florida State College's Melbourne campus.

On January 13, 2016, Orlando City announced that they would play the entire 2016 season at Camping World Stadium. They had hoped to move into Orlando City Stadium in September but construction delays made that impossible. The team instead moved in 2017.

== Roster ==
No.	Nationality	Name	Position(s)	Date of birth (age)	Previous club	Notes
Goalkeepers
1	(United States)	Joe Bendik	GK	April 25, 1989 (aged 26)	(Canada) Toronto FC	–
36	(United States)	Earl Edwards Jr.	GK	January 24, 1992 (aged 24)	(United States) UCLA Bruins	–
Defenders
2	(United States)	Tyler Turner	RB	March 4, 1996 (aged 20)	(United States) IMG Academy Bradenton	HGP
3	(England)	Seb Hines	CB	May 29, 1988 (aged 27)	(England) Middlesbrough	–
4	(Uruguay)	José Aja	CB	May 10, 1993 (aged 22)	(Uruguay) Nacional	INT, Loan in
12	(United States)	Kevin Alston	DF	May 5, 1988 (aged 27)	(United States) New England Revolution	–
14	(England)	Luke Boden	LB	November 26, 1988 (aged 27)	(England) Sheffield Wednesday	–
16	(Honduras)	Devron García	CB/DM	February 17, 1996 (aged 20)	(Honduras) C.D. Victoria	INT
20	(United States)	Brek Shea	LB/LW	February 28, 1990 (aged 26)	(England) Stoke City	–
23	(United States)	Conor Donovan	CB	January 8, 1996 (aged 20)	(United States) NC State Wolfpack	GA
27	(Portugal)	Rafael Ramos	RB	January 9, 1995 (aged 21)	(Portugal) S.L. Benfica Juniors U-19	INT
29	(United States)	Tommy Redding	CB	January 24, 1997 (aged 19)	(United States) FC America	HGP
44	(Spain)	David Mateos	CB	April 22, 1987 (aged 28)	(Hungary) Ferencváros	INT
45	(United States)	Mikey Ambrose	DF	October 5, 1993 (aged 22)	(United States) Orlando City B	–
Midfielders
5	(United States)	Servando Carrasco	DM	August 13, 1988 (aged 27)	(United States) Sporting Kansas City	–
6	(Canada)	Richie Laryea	AM	January 7, 1995 (aged 21)	(United States) Akron Zips	GA
7	(Colombia)	Cristian Higuita	CM	January 14, 1994 (aged 22)	(Colombia) Deportivo Cali	INT
8	(England)	Harrison Heath	DM	April 16, 1996 (aged 19)	(England) Norwich City U-18	HGP
10	(Brazil)	Kaká (captain)	AM	April 22, 1982 (aged 33)	(Italy) A.C. Milan	INT, DP
18	(Trinidad and Tobago)	Kevin Molino	AM/RW	June 17, 1990 (aged 25)	(Trinidad and Tobago) Ma Pau SC	–
22	(Italy)	Antonio Nocerino	DM	April 9, 1985 (aged 30)	(Italy) A.C. Milan	INT
30	(Argentina)	Matías Pérez García	AM	October 13, 1984 (aged 31)	(United States) San Jose Earthquakes	INT, DP
46	(Belize)	Tony Rocha	CM/DM	August 21, 1993 (aged 22)	(United States) Orlando City B	–
Forwards
11	(Colombia)	Carlos Rivas	FW/LW	April 15, 1994 (aged 21)	(Colombia) Deportivo Cali	INT, DP
13	(Guinea)	Hadji Barry	FW	December 8, 1992 (aged 23)	(United States) Philadelphia Union	–
15	(Brazil)	Pedro Ribeiro	AM/SS	June 13, 1990 (aged 25)	(United States) UCF Knights	–
19	(Brazil)	Júlio Baptista	CF	October 1, 1981 (aged 34)	(Brazil) Cruzeiro	INT
21	(Canada)	Cyle Larin	FW	April 17, 1995 (aged 20)	(United States) Connecticut Huskies	GA, INT

== Competitions ==
=== Friendlies ===
February 7	Eastern Florida Titans	0–4	Orlando City	Melbourne, Florida
1:00pm EST		Report	Barry 8', 31'; Turner 24'; Rocha 66'	Stadium: Titan Soccer Complex

February 13	Jacksonville Armada	2–1	Orlando City	Jacksonville, Florida
6:00pm EST	Jérôme 48'; Keita 58'	Report	Kaká 23'	Stadium: Community First Park; Attendance: Not reported

February 17	Orlando City	3–2	New York Red Bulls	Celebration, Florida
6:00pm EST	Kaká 23'; Winter 62'; Ribeiro 85'	Report	Wright Phillips 25'; Lawrence 36'	Stadium: Championsgate; Attendance: Closed scrimmage

February 20	Orlando City	2–1	Toronto FC	Celebration, Florida
6:00pm EST	Kaká 47', 63' (pen.)	Report	Osorio 5'	Stadium: Championsgate; Attendance: Closed scrimmage

February 27	Orlando City	6–1	Bahia	Orlando, Florida
6:00pm EST	Hines 12', 58', 71', 86'; Ribeiro 78'; Cerén 88'	Report	Zé Roberto 1'	Stadium: Camping World Stadium; Referee: Ted Unkel

February 28	Orlando City	1–1	UCF Knights	Sanford, Florida
6:00pm EST	Heath 2' (pen.)	Report	Delwer 1'	Stadium: Sylvan Lake Park; Attendance: Closed scrimmage

=== Major League Soccer ===
All times in regular season on Eastern Daylight Time (UTC−04:00) except where otherwise noted.

It was announced on December 22, 2015, that, just like the 2015 season, Orlando City would open the campaign at home, this year against Real Salt Lake. The remainder of the schedule was released on January 7, 2016.

Results summary

Overall								Home						Away					
Pld	W	D	L	GF	GA	GD	Pts	W	D	L	GF	GA	GD	W	D	L	GF	GA	GD
34	9	14	11	55	60	−5	41	6	7	4	31	28	+3	3	7	7	24	32	−8

Source: Match reports

Round	1	2	3	4	5	6	7	8	9	10	11	12	13	14	15	16	17	18	19	20	21	22	23	24	25	26	27	28	29	30	31	32	33	34
Stadium	H	H	A	H	A	H	A	A	H	A	H	H	A	H	H	A	H	A	A	A	H	H	A	A	H	H	A	A	H	A	A	H	A	H
Result	D	D	W	W	L	D	L	D	D	L	W	D	D	D	W	L	D	L	D	D	W	L	D	D	L	W	W	L	L	L	D	L	W	W

Source: Match reports
A = Away; H = Home; W = Win; D = Draw; L = Loss

Results

March 6 1	Orlando City	2–2	Real Salt Lake	Orlando, Florida
2:00 p.m. EST	Cerén (red card) 45+2'; Larin 90+4'; Winter 90+5'	Report	Phillips (yellow card) 11' (yellow-red card) 20'; Joao Plata 26' (pen.), 66'	Stadium: Orlando Citrus Bowl; Attendance: 60,147; Referee: Chris Penso

March 11 2	Orlando City	1–1	Chicago Fire	Orlando, Florida
7:00 p.m. EST	Larin 4'; Higuita (yellow card) 62'; Carrasco (yellow card) 75'; Shea (yellow card) 90'	Report	Accam 14', (yellow card) 83'; Polster (yellow card) 28'; Harrington (red card) 32'; Meira (yellow card) 71'	Stadium: Orlando Citrus Bowl; Attendance: 29,041; Referee: Ted Unkel

March 18 3	New York City FC	0–1	Orlando City	New York, New York
7:00 p.m. EDT	Taylor (yellow card) 39'	Report	Larin 7'; Higuita (yellow card) 90'; Hines (yellow card) 90+3'	Stadium: Yankee Stadium; Attendance: 24,597; Referee: Allen Chapman

April 3 4	Orlando City	4–1	Portland Timbers	Orlando, Florida
8:00 p.m. EDT	Hines 13'; Shea 32'; Kaká 48'; Molino 76' (pen.)	Report	McInerney 89'	Stadium: Orlando Citrus Bowl; Attendance: 31,114; Referee: Alan Kelly

April 8 5	Philadelphia Union	2–1	Orlando City	Chester, Pennsylvania
7:00 p.m. EDT	Sapong 2'; Barnetta 90'	Report	Winter 43'	Stadium: Talen Energy Stadium; Attendance: 15,011; Referee: Jair Maruffo

April 17 6	Orlando City	2–2	New England Revolution	Orlando, Florida
3:30 p.m. EDT	Kaká 2' (pen.); Molino 90+2'	Report	Bunbury 37'; Nguyen 90+6' (pen.)	Stadium: Orlando Citrus Bowl; Attendance: 36,048; Referee: Baldomero Toledo

April 24 7	New York Red Bulls	3–2	Orlando City	Harrison, New Jersey
7:30 p.m. EDT	Grella 65'; Bradley Wright-Phillips 69', 75'	Report	Larin 3'; Ouimette 84' (o.g.)	Stadium: Red Bull Arena; Attendance: 18,238; Referee: Hilario Grajeda

April 30 8	New England Revolution	2–2	Orlando City	Foxborough, Massachusetts
7:30 p.m. EDT	Fagundez 7'; Agudelo 71'	Report	Molino 30'; Rivas 90'	Stadium: Gillette Stadium; Attendance: 25,203; Referee: Robert Sibiga

May 6 9	Orlando City	1–1	New York Red Bulls	Orlando, Florida
7:00 p.m. EDT	Molino 67'	Report	B. Wright-Phillips 19'	Stadium: Camping World Stadium; Attendance: 31,264; Referee: Ted Unkel

May 15 10	Sporting Kansas City	2–1	Orlando City	Kansas City, Kansas
3:30 p.m. EDT	Dwyer 74'; Peterson 79'	Report	Medranda 67' (o.g.)	Stadium: Children's Mercy Park; Attendance: 19,080; Referee: Ismail Elfath

May 21 11	Orlando City	2–1	Montreal Impact	Orlando, Florida
7:30 p.m. EDT	Larin 43', 87'	Report	Piatti 4'	Stadium: Camping World Stadium; Attendance: 34,081; Referee: Mark Geiger

May 25 12	Orlando City	2–2	Philadelphia Union	Orlando, Florida
7:30 p.m. EDT	Molino 68'; Larin 71'	Report	Barnetta 52'; Tribbett 75'	Stadium: Camping World Stadium; Attendance: 24,109; Referee: Sorin Stoika

May 29 13	New York City FC	2–2	Orlando City	New York, New York
4:00 p.m. EDT	Brillant 42'; Villa 67'	Report	Baptista 72'; Molino 90+4'	Stadium: Yankee Stadium; Attendance: 15,039; Referee: Jorge Gonzalez

June 18 14	Orlando City	2–2	San Jose Earthquakes	Orlando, Florida
7:30 p.m. EDT	Hines 66'; Baptista 90+1'	Report	Barrett 85'; Salinas 90+4'	Stadium: Camping World Stadium; Attendance: 37,194 (Pulse tribute game); Referee: Robert Sibiga

June 25 15	Orlando City	3–2	Toronto FC	Orlando, Florida
7:30 p.m. EDT	Larin 5'; Winter 83'; Kaká 90+10' (pen.)	Report	Hamilton 47'; Morrow 90'	Stadium: Camping World Stadium; Attendance: 27,818; Referee: Ismail Elfath

July 4 16	FC Dallas	4–0	Orlando City	Frisco, Texas
9:00 p.m. EDT	Zimmerman 11'; Barrios 21', (yellow card) 29'; Hedges 61'; Gruezo (yellow card) 68'; Harris (yellow card) 70'; Castillo 90+2'	Report	Redding (yellow card) 39'; Mateos (yellow card) 55'	Stadium: Toyota Stadium; Attendance: 16,195; Referee: Silviu Petrescu

July 8 17	Orlando City	0–0	Houston Dynamo	Orlando, Florida
7:30 p.m. EDT		Report		Stadium: Camping World Stadium; Attendance: 28,104; Referee: Fotis Bazakos

July 13 18	New York Red Bulls	2–0	Orlando City	Harrison, New Jersey
7:30 p.m. EDT	Lade 37'; Muyl (yellow card) 45+2'; Felipe 59'	Report	Mateos (yellow card) 49'; Shea (yellow card) 52'; Higuita (yellow card) 68'	Stadium: Red Bull Arena; Attendance: 19,121; Referee: Sorin Stoica

July 16 19	Vancouver Whitecaps FC	2–2	Orlando City	Vancouver, British Columbia
10:00 p.m. EDT	Mezquida 35'; Kudo 43'; Jacobson (yellow card) 90+2'	Report	Baptista 14'; Larin 50'; Carrasco (yellow card) 69'	Stadium: BC Place; Attendance: 22,120; Referee: Hilari Grajeda

July 23 20	Columbus Crew	2–2	Orlando City	Columbus, Ohio
7:30 p.m. EDT	Tchani 20'; Kamara 45+6' (pen.)	Report	Bendik (yellow card) 45+5'; Molino (yellow card) 45+6', (goal) 65'; Boden (yellow card) 62'; Larin 69'	Stadium: Mapfre Stadium; Attendance: 20,034; Referee: Drew Fischer

July 31 21	Orlando City	3–1	New England Revolution	Orlando, Florida
7:30 p.m. EDT	Larin 46'; Molino 64', 83'	Report	Kamara 20'	Stadium: Camping World Stadium; Attendance: 27,768; Referee: Silviu Petrescu

August 7 22	Orlando City	1–3	Seattle Sounders FC	Orlando, Florida
7:00 p.m. EDT	Hines 7'; Nocerino (yellow card) 33'; Hines (yellow card) 58'; Mateos (yellow card) 84'	Report	Dempsey 14', 37', 48'; Roldan (yellow card) 64'; Alonso (yellow card) 73'; Lodeiro (yellow card) 74'; Scott (yellow card) 76'	Stadium: Camping World Stadium; Attendance: 28,247; Referee: Allen Chapman

August 14 23	Chicago Fire	2–2	Orlando City	Bridgeview, Illinois
3:30 p.m. EDT	Goosens 6'; Accam (yellow card) 45+2'; Cociș 78'	Report	Larin 9'; Redding (yellow card) 17'; Kaká 32'; Aja (yellow card) 86'	Stadium: Toyota Park; Attendance: 18,148; Referee: Mark Geiger

August 20 24	Colorado Rapids	0–0	Orlando City	Commerce City, Colorado
9:00 p.m. EDT	Doyle (yellow card) 42'	Report	Aja (yellow card) 43'; Mateos (yellow card) 65'; Shea (yellow card) 79'	Stadium: Dick's Sporting Goods Park; Attendance: 16,813; Referee: Sorin Stoika

August 24 25	Orlando City	1–2	Toronto FC	Orlando, Florida
7:30 p.m. EDT	Larin 56'; Hines (yellow card) 57'; Mateos (yellow card) 82'	Report	Ricketts 7'; Delgado (yellow card) 52'; Altidore 86'	Stadium: Camping World Stadium; Attendance: 23,802; Referee: Chris Penso

August 28 26	Orlando City	2–1	New York City FC	Orlando, Florida
7:00 p.m. EDT	Kaká 32', 63' (pen.); Nocerino (yellow card) 80'	Report	Chanot (yellow card) 54'; Mendoza 55'; McNamara (yellow card) 59'	Stadium: Camping World Stadium; Attendance: 27,482; Referee: Robert Sibiga

September 7 27	Montreal Impact	1–4	Orlando City	Montreal
7:30 p.m. EDT	Drogba 2'; Bernier (yellow card) 51'; Bush (red card) 51'; Bernardello (yellow card) 84'	Report	Shea 4', (yellow card) 45'; Kaká 36', 54' (pen.); Carrasco (yellow card) 55'; Rivas 77', (yellow card) 89'	Stadium: Saputo Stadium; Attendance: 17,389; Referee: Silviu Petrescu

September 11 28	LA Galaxy	4–2	Orlando City	Carson, California
7:00 p.m. EDT	Giovani 35', 45' (pen.); Gordon 38'; Garcia (yellow card) 45+2'; Cole (yellow card) 55'; Keane 70'; Mendiola (yellow card) 75'	Report	Molino 20'; Rocha (yellow card) 48'; Mateos (yellow card) 60'; Shea 90+2'	Stadium: StubHub Center; Attendance: 27,167; Referee: Ismail Elfath

September 17 29	Orlando City	1–4	Columbus Crew	Orlando, Florida
7:30 p.m. EDT	Rivas (yellow card) 49'; García (yellow card) 57'; Ambrose (yellow card) 60'; Larin 79'	Report	Finlay 6'; Hines 22' (o.g.); Kamara 44', 90+5'; Sauro (yellow card) 62'	Stadium: Camping World Stadium; Attendance: 30,218; Referee: Drew Fischer

September 24 30	D.C. United	4–1	Orlando City	Washington, D.C.
7:00 p.m. EDT	Acosta (yellow card) 25'; Mullins 34', 53'; Sam 51'; Büscher (yellow card) 59' (goal) 90'; Vincent (yellow card) 72'	Report	Nocerino (red card) 66'; Alston (yellow card) 67'; Baptista 72'	Stadium: RFK Stadium; Attendance: 25,842; Referee: Sorin Stoica

September 28 31	Toronto FC	0–0	Orlando City	Toronto, Ontario
7:30 p.m. EDT	Ricketts (yellow card) 56' (yellow-red card) 70'; Beitashour (yellow card) 74'	Report	Shea (yellow card) 45'; Higuita (yellow card) 62'	Stadium: BMO Field; Attendance: 23,805; Referee: Alan Kelly

October 2 32	Orlando City	0–1	Montreal Impact	Orlando, Florida
1:00 p.m. EDT	Boden (yellow card) 77'	Report	Oduro 56'; Fisher (yellow card) 65'	Stadium: Camping World Stadium; Attendance: 26,041; Referee: Armando Villarreal

October 16 33	Philadelphia Union	0–2	Orlando City	Chester, Pennsylvania
5:00 p.m. EDT	Marquez (yellow card) 38'; Herbers (yellow card) 44'; Barnetta (yellow card) 67'	Report	Aja (yellow card) 56'; Rivas 59'; Baptista 90+5'	Stadium: Talen Energy Stadium; Attendance: 18,007; Referee: Ricardo Salazar

October 23 34	Orlando City	4–2	D.C. United	Orlando, Florida
4:00 p.m. EDT	Molino 13'; Kaká 21'; Higuita 50'; Baptista 89'	Report	Saborío 43'; Igboananike 78'	Stadium: Camping World Stadium (final game); Attendance: 30,022; Referee: Juan Guzman

==== Standings ====
Eastern Conference table

Pos	Team	Pld	W	L	T	GF	GA	GD	Pts	Qualification
6	Philadelphia Union	34	11	14	9	52	55	−3	42	MLS Cup Knockout Round
7	New England Revolution	34	11	14	9	44	54	−10	42	
8	Orlando City SC	34	9	11	14	55	60	−5	41	
9	Columbus Crew SC	34	8	14	12	50	58	−8	36	
10	Chicago Fire	34	7	17	10	42	58	−16	31	

Source: MLS

Overall table

Pos	Team	Pld	W	L	T	GF	GA	GD	Pts
13	Philadelphia Union	34	11	14	9	52	55	−3	42
14	New England Revolution	34	11	14	9	44	54	−10	42
15	Orlando City SC	34	9	11	14	55	60	−5	41
16	Vancouver Whitecaps FC	34	10	15	9	45	52	−7	39
17	San Jose Earthquakes	34	8	12	14	32	40	−8	38

Source: MLS
Rules for classification: 1) points; 2) total wins; 3) total goal differential; 4) total goals scored;

=== U.S. Open Cup ===
On May 21, 2016, Orlando City was drawn to face the winner of the third round match between Jacksonville Armada FC, and the winner of the second round match between The Villages SC and Charleston Battery. Although The Villages SC won the match on penalty shootout, they were subsequently disqualified for fielding an ineligible player. Jacksonville Armada ultimately won the third round matchup, setting up a match in Jacksonville against Orlando City, a rematch of their preseason match.

Bracket

Fourth round June 14–15
MLS	Portland Timbers	2
MLS	San Jose Earthquakes	0
MLS	LA Galaxy	4*
USASA	La Máquina FC	1
MLS	Real Salt Lake	2(3)
USL	Wilmington Hammerheads FC	2(1)
MLS	Seattle Sounders FC	2
PDL	Kitsap Pumas	0
MLS	Houston Dynamo	4
USL	San Antonio FC	0
NASL	Minnesota United FC	1
MLS	Sporting Kansas City	2*
MLS	FC Dallas	2(6)
USL	Oklahoma City Energy FC	2(5)
MLS	Colorado Rapids	1
USL	Colorado Springs Switchbacks FC	0
MLS	New York City FC	0
NASL	New York Cosmos	1
NASL	Carolina RailHawks	0
MLS	New England Revolution	1*
MLS	Philadelphia Union	3
USL	Harrisburg City Islanders	2
USL	Rochester Rhinos	0
MLS	New York Red Bulls	1
MLS	Chicago Fire	1(4)
NASL	Indy Eleven	1(3)
MLS	Columbus Crew SC	4
NASL	Tampa Bay Rowdies	0
NASL	Jacksonville Armada FC	0
MLS	Orlando City SC	1
MLS	D.C. United	0(3)
NASL	Fort Lauderdale Strikers	0(4)

Round of 16; June 28–29
MLS	Portland Timbers	0
MLS	LA Galaxy	1
MLS	Real Salt Lake	1(1)
MLS	Seattle Sounders FC	1(4)
MLS	Houston Dynamo	3
MLS	Sporting Kansas City	1
MLS	FC Dallas	2*
MLS	Colorado Rapids	1
NASL	New York Cosmos	2
MLS	New England Revolution	3
MLS	Philadelphia Union	2
MLS	New York Red Bulls	1
MLS	Chicago Fire	2
MLS	Columbus Crew SC	1
MLS	Orlando City SC	1
NASL	Fort Lauderdale Strikers	2*

Quarterfinals; July 20
MLS	LA Galaxy	4
MLS	Seattle Sounders FC	2
MLS	Houston Dynamo	0
MLS	FC Dallas	1
MLS	New England Revolution	1(4)
MLS	Philadelphia Union	1(2)
MLS	Chicago Fire	3
NASL	Fort Lauderdale Strikers	0

Semifinals; August 9–10
MLS	LA Galaxy	1
MLS	FC Dallas	2*
MLS	New England Revolution	3
MLS	Chicago Fire	1

Final; September 13
MLS	FC Dallas	4
MLS	New England Revolution	2

- Host team listed first
- Bold winner
- * = after extra time, ( ) = penalty shootout score

June 15 Fourth round	Jacksonville Armada (Florida)	0–1	(Florida) Orlando City	Jacksonville, Florida
7:00pm		Report	Mateos 62'	Stadium: Southern Oak Stadium; Attendance: 2,155

June 29 Round of 16	Orlando City (Florida)	1–2 (a.e.t.)	(Florida) Fort Lauderdale Strikers	Orlando, Florida
7:30 PM EDT	Molino 15'	Report	Angulo 12'; PC 120'	Stadium: Camping World Stadium; Attendance: 3,162; Referee: Caleb Mendez

== Squad statistics ==
=== Appearances ===
As of match played October 23, 2016

Starting appearances are listed first, followed by substitute appearances after the + symbol where applicable.

No.	Pos	Nat	Player	Total		MLS		Open Cup	
No.	Pos	Nat	Player	Apps	Goals	Apps	Goals	Apps	Goals
Goalkeepers
1	GK	(United States) USA	Joe Bendik	34	0	34	0	0	0
36	GK	(United States) USA	Earl Edwards Jr.	2	0	0	0	2	0
Defenders
3	DF	(England) ENG	Seb Hines	27	3	23+3	3	1	0
4	DF	(Uruguay) URU	José Aja	10	0	9+1	0	0	0
12	DF	(United States) USA	Kevin Alston	26	0	21+3	0	1+1	0
14	DF	(England) ENG	Luke Boden	21	0	19+1	0	1	0
20	DF	(United States) USA	Brek Shea	28	3	22+5	3	1	0
27	DF	(Portugal) POR	Rafael Ramos	13	0	12	0	1	0
29	DF	(United States) USA	Tommy Redding	20	0	16+2	0	2	0
44	DF	(Spain) ESP	David Mateos	22	1	20+1	0	1	1
45	DF	(United States) USA	Mikey Ambrose	5	0	4+1	0	0	0
Midfielders
5	MF	(United States) USA	Servando Carrasco	33	0	21+10	0	2	0
7	MF	(Colombia) COL	Cristian Higuita	21	1	16+5	1	0	0
10	MF	(Brazil) BRA	Kaká	24	9	17+7	9	0	0
18	MF	(Trinidad and Tobago) TRI	Kevin Molino	32	12	26+4	11	1+1	1
22	MF	(Italy) ITA	Antonio Nocerino	23	0	19+2	0	2	0
30	MF	(Argentina) ARG	Matías Pérez García	13	0	8+5	0	0	0
46	MF	(Belize) BLZ	Tony Rocha	10	0	2+6	0	1+1	0
Forwards
11	FW	(Colombia) COL	Carlos Rivas	22	3	8+13	3	1	0
15	FW	(Brazil) BRA	Pedro Ribeiro	3	0	1+2	0	0	0
19	FW	(Brazil) BRA	Júlio Baptista	24	6	5+18	6	1	0
21	FW	(Canada) CAN	Cyle Larin	33	14	29+3	14	0+1	0
Players away from the club on loan:
2	DF	(United States) USA	Tyler Turner	0	0	0	0	0	0
6	MF	(Canada) CAN	Richie Laryea	0	0	0	0	0	0
8	MF	(England) ENG	Harrison Heath	5	0	1+2	0	2	0
13	FW	(Guinea) GUI	Hadji Barry	10	0	4+4	0	2	0
16	MF	(Honduras) HON	Devron García	0	0	0	0	0	0
23	DF	(United States) USA	Conor Donovan	0	0	0	0	0	0
Players who appeared for the club but left during the season:
17	MF	(El Salvador) SLV	Darwin Cerén	16	0	14+2	0	0	0
32	MF	(Switzerland) SUI	Adrian Winter	14	3	6+7	3	0+1	0
78	DF	(France) FRA	Aurélien Collin	2	0	1+1	0	0	0

=== Goalscorers ===
As of match played October 23, 2016

Rank	No.	Pos.	Name	MLS	Open Cup	Total
1	21	FW	(Canada) Cyle Larin	14	0	14
2	18	MF	(Trinidad and Tobago) Kevin Molino	11	1	12
3	10	MF	(Brazil) Kaká	9	0	9
4	19	FW	(Brazil) Júlio Baptista	6	0	6
5	3	DF	(England) Seb Hines	3	0	3
5	11	FW	(Colombia) Carlos Rivas	3	0	3
5	20	DF	(United States) Brek Shea	3	0	3
5	32	MF	(Switzerland) Adrian Winter	3	0	3
9	7	MF	(Colombia) Cristian Higuita	1	0	1
9	44	DF	(Spain) David Mateos	0	1	1
Own goal				2	0	2
Total				55	2	57

=== Shutouts ===
As of match played October 23, 2016

Rank	No.	Name	MLS	Open Cup	Total
1	1	(United States) Joe Bendik	5	0	5
2	36	(United States) Earl Edwards Jr.	0	1	1
Total			5	1	6

== Player movement ==
Per Major League Soccer and club policies, terms of the deals do not get disclosed.

=== MLS SuperDraft picks ===
Draft picks are not automatically signed to the team roster. The 2016 draft was held on January 14, 2016. Orlando had four selections.

2016 Orlando City MLS SuperDraft Picks
Round	Selection	Player	Position	College	Status
1	7	(Canada) Richie Laryea	MF	(Ohio) University of Akron	Signed
1	13	(Guinea) Hadji Barry	MF	University of Central Florida	Signed
3	48	(United States) Antonio Matarazzo	MF	(New York (state)) Columbia University	Not signed
4	68	(Nigeria) Tobenna Uzo	FW	(South Carolina) Coastal Carolina University	Not signed

=== Transfers in ===
Date	Name	Pos.	Transferred from	Fee/notes	Ref.
November 9, 2015	(United States) Mason Stajduhar	GK	(United States) Orlando City Academy	MLS Homegrown Player	
December 17, 2015	(United States) Kevin Alston	DF	(United States) New England Revolution	MLS Re-Entry Draft	
December 21, 2015	(United States) Joe Bendik	GK	(United States) Toronto FC	Traded for a conditional 2017 MLS SuperDraft 4th Round Pick	
January 27, 2016	(Honduras) Devron García	DF	(Honduras) C.D. Victoria	Undisclosed Fee	
February 18, 2016	(Italy) Antonio Nocerino	MF	(Italy) A.C. Milan	T.A.M and G.A.M to D.C. United	
March 23, 2016	(Brazil) Júlio Baptista	FW	(Brazil) Cruzeiro	Undisclosed Fee	
August 3, 2016	(Argentina) Matías Pérez García	MF	(United States) San Jose Earthquakes	Traded for Darwin Cerén	
August 4, 2016	(United States) Mikey Ambrose	DF	(United States) Orlando City B		
August 4, 2016	(Belize) Tony Rocha	MF	(United States) Orlando City B		

=== Loan in ===
Pos.	Name	Loaned from	Start date	End date	Ref.
DF	(Uruguay) José Aja	(Uruguay) Nacional	July 21, 2016	December 2016	

=== Transfers out ===
Date	Name	Pos.	Transferred to	Fee/notes	Ref.
November 25, 2015	(United States) Corey Ashe	DF	(United States) Columbus Crew	Declined Contract Option	
November 25, 2015	(Democratic Republic of the Congo) Danny Mwanga	FW	(United States) Tampa Bay Rowdies	Declined Contract Option	
November 25, 2015	(United States) Tally Hall	GK	(United States) D.C. United	Declined Contract Option	
November 25, 2015	(United States) Josh Ford	GK	(United States) San Antonio FC	Declined Contract Option	
November 25, 2015	(United States) Eric Avila	MF	(United States) Tampa Bay Rowdies	Declined Contract Option	
November 25, 2015	(England) Lewis Neal	MF	(United States) Orlando City B	Declined Contract Option	
November 25, 2015	(United States) Adam Bedell	FW	Unattached	Declined Contract Option	
November 25, 2015	(Puerto Rico) Sidney Rivera	FW	Puerto Rico FC	Declined Contract Option	
November 25, 2015	(United States) Tony Cascio	MF	(United States) Arizona United SC	Expired Contract	
February 1, 2016	(Angola) Estrela	MF	(Cyprus) APOEL	Released	
April 29, 2016	(France) Aurélien Collin	DF	(United States) New York Red Bulls	2017 MLS Super Draft Fourth Round Pick	
July 5, 2016	(Switzerland) Adrian Winter	MF	(Switzerland) FC Zürich	Mutual Termination	
August 3, 2016	(El Salvador) Darwin Cerén	MF	(United States) San Jose Earthquakes	Traded for Matías Pérez García	

=== Loan out ===
No.	Pos.	Name	Loaned to	Start date	End date	Ref.
2	DF	(United States) Tyler Turner	(United States) Orlando City B	March 25, 2016	—	
6	MF	(Canada) Richmond Laryea	(United States) Orlando City B	March 25, 2016	—	
8	DF	(England) Harrison Heath	(United States) Orlando City B	March 25, 2016	—	
13	FW	(Guinea) Hadji Barry	(United States) Orlando City B	March 25, 2016	—	
25	GK	(United States) Mason Stajduhar	(United States) Orlando City B	March 25, 2016	—	
35	FW	(Honduras) Bryan Róchez	(United States) Orlando City B	March 25, 2016	—	
16	DF	(Honduras) Devron García	(United States) Orlando City B	April 15, 2016	—	
23	DF	(United States) Conor Donovan	(United States) Orlando City B	May 1, 2016	—	
14	DF	(England) Luke Boden	(United States) Orlando City B	May 7, 2016	May 8, 2016	
35	FW	(Honduras) Bryan Róchez	(Honduras) Real España	July 22, 2016	End of 2016 season	

== Notable events ==
On April 26, 2016, Florida Citrus Sports announced that they had sold naming rights for the stadium to Camping World. Camping World would also be the presenting sponsor of the stadium's college football kickoff series for at least its first four years, through 2019.

Adrian Heath was sacked by Orlando City on July 7, 2016, following a 4–0 defeat against FC Dallas. Bobby Murphy was the interim head coach until the hiring of former NYCFC manager Jason Kreis on July 19.

On October 2, the Lions were mathematically eliminated from the playoffs with a 1–0 loss at Montreal.

The season ended on October 23, in the final game at Camping World Stadium, with a 4–2 win against D.C. United.

== Media ==
Any matches that are not featured in the MLS national television package on either ESPN2, Fox Sports 1 or UniMás will air locally on WRDQ 27. Jeff Radcliffe will call play-by-play, with Lewis Neal providing color commentary. They will also air pregame and postgame shows for each match, and a weekly highlight show. They are working on affiliate agreements to air matches out-of-market.

On the radio, matches will air on WTKS-FM "Real Radio 104.1" in English, with Tom Traxler and Adam Schick providing the call. When City is on a nationally televised match, Jeff Radcliffe will call the match on WTKS with Tom Traxler. Matches will also air on WONQ "La Grande 1030" in Spanish. The Spanish play-by-play announcer is Israel Herredia, with color commentary by Sergio Ruiz. The Spanish radio feed will be used as the SAP Spanish feed on Fox Sports Florida and Sun Sports.

Orlando City will black out matches not on the MLS national television package on MLS Live this season. Local fans will be unable to watch locally televised matches via live stream during the matches, though they will become available immediately upon completion.

== See also ==
- 2016 in American soccer
- 2016 Major League Soccer season
