= Zach Pope =

American soccer player (born 1986)

Zack Pope
Personal information
- Full name: Zack Pope
- Date of birth: March 20, 1986 (age 40)
- Place of birth: Austin, Texas, United States
- Height: 5 ft 3 in (1.60 m)
- Position: Defender

Team information
- Current team: Austin Aztex

Youth career
- 2004–2007: Duke Blue Devils

Senior career*
Years	Team	Apps	(Gls)
2005–2006	Austin Lightning	12	(0)
2008	Rochester Rhinos	0	(0)
2008	Austin Aztex U23	11	(0)
2009	Austin Aztex	7	(0)
2012	Austin Aztex	9	(0)
- * Club domestic league appearances and goals as of June 18, 2012

Zack Pope (born March 20, 1986, in Austin, Texas) is an American soccer player.

== Career ==
=== Youth and amateur ===
Pope attended Stony Point High School, and played college soccer at Duke University on a partial soccer scholarship, graduating with a psychology degree and a minor in sociology.

He was drafted in the third round (40th overall) in the 2008 MLS Supplemental Draft by Chicago Fire, but was not offered a professional contract with the team. He would later rejoin Chicago Fire reserves and F.C. Dallas reserves in the 2008 season; after an abbreviated stint with the Rochester Rhinos, he joined the Aztex junior team, Austin Aztex U23 in 2008.

=== Professional ===
Pope joined the USL First Division expansion franchise Austin Aztex in March 2009. He made his professional debut on April 18, 2009, in Austin's USL1 season opener against Minnesota Thunder.

He was released by the Aztex at the end of the 2009 season.

He is currently the assistant soccer coach at Southwestern University in Georgetown, TX.
