= Andres Cuero =

American soccer player (born 1989)

Personal information
- Full name: Julio Andres Cuero
- Date of birth: July 8, 1989 (age 37)
- Place of birth: Austin, Texas, United States
- Height: 5 ft 10 in (1.78 m)
- Position: Forward

Youth career
- 2006–2009: Charlotte 49ers

Senior career*
Years	Team	Apps	(Gls)
2008–2009	Austin Aztex U23	19	(9)
2010	DFW Tornados	3	(1)
2011–2012	Wilmington Hammerheads	34	(4)
2013–2014	Austin Aztex (PDL)	20	(9)
2015	Austin Aztex	0	(0)
- * Club domestic league appearances and goals as of January 23, 2014

Andres Cuero (born July 8, 1989) is an American soccer player who played for Austin Aztex in the USL Pro.

== Career ==
=== College and amateur ===
Cuero played his college soccer at the University of North Carolina at Charlotte, where he was third-team NSCAA All-Mid-Atlantic Region Honors and earned All-Tournament honors after leading the 49ers to tournament titles in the Davidson/Adidas Classic.

During his college career, Cuero played with USL Premier Development League club Austin Aztex U23 during their 2008 and 2009 seasons, and with th DFW Tornados in 2010.

=== Professional ===
Cuero signed his first professional contract in February 2011, joining USL Pro club Wilmington Hammerheads. He made his professional debut on April 17, 2011, in Wilmington's first game of the 2011 season, a 1–0 win over the Rochester Rhinos, and scored his first professional goal on June 4 in a 4–2 loss to Orlando City.

Cuero re-signed with Wilmington for the 2012 season on December 5, 2011.
