= Paul Dalglish =

Scottish footballer (born 1977)

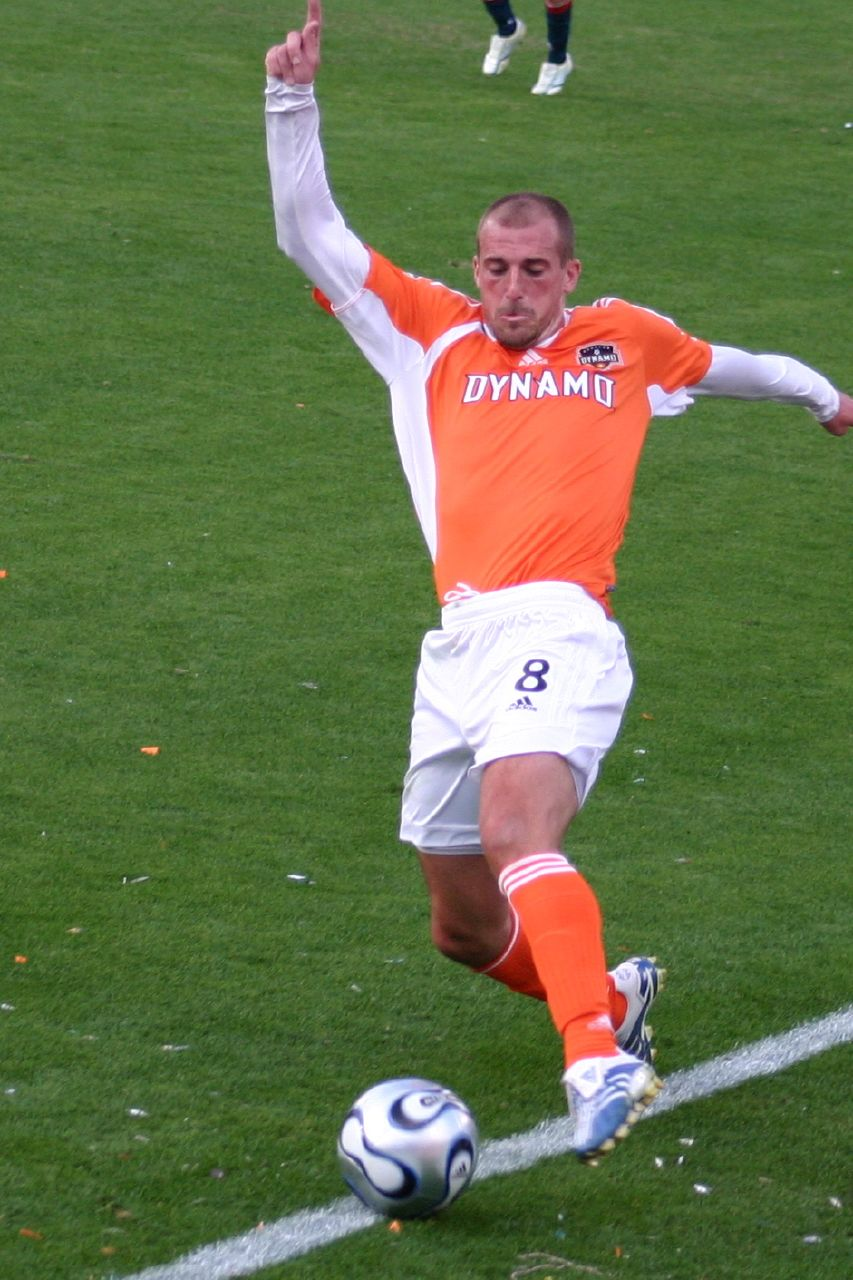
- Dalglish in 2006

Personal information
- Full name: Paul Kenneth Dalglish
- Date of birth: 18 February 1977 (age 49)
- Place of birth: Glasgow, Scotland
- Height: 1.76 m (5 ft 9 in)
- Position: Forward

Youth career
- 1995–1996: Celtic
- 1996–1997: Liverpool

Senior career*
Years	Team	Apps	(Gls)
1997–1999	Newcastle United	11	(1)
1997–1998	→ Bury (loan)	12	(0)
1999	→ Norwich City (loan)	5	(0)
1999–2002	Norwich City	38	(2)
2001	→ Wigan Athletic (loan)	6	(0)
2001–2002	→ Wigan Athletic (loan)	29	(2)
2002–2003	Blackpool	27	(1)
2003	→ Scunthorpe United (loan)	8	(3)
2003	Linfield	10	(5)
2004–2006	Livingston	26	(3)
2006	Hibernian	13	(1)
2006–2007	Houston Dynamo	11	(2)
2008	Kilmarnock	6	(0)
Total		206	(22)

International career
1999–2000	Scotland U21		

Managerial career
- 2009: Houston Dynamo (assistant)
- 2010: FC Tampa Bay
- 2012–2013: Austin Aztex
- 2014: Real Salt Lake (assistant)
- 2015: Austin Aztex
- 2015–2017: Ottawa Fury
- 2018–2019: Miami FC
- 2020–2021: Miami FC
- * Club domestic league appearances and goals

Paul Kenneth Dalglish (born 18 February 1977) is a Scottish former professional footballer. He played for ten clubs in Scotland, England, Northern Ireland as well as for Houston Dynamo, with whom he won MLS Cup Final medals in 2006 (as Most Valuable Player) and 2007. In coaching in North America he has to date won eight honours from his work with Miami FC and Austin Aztecs.

== Early years ==
Born in 1977, Paul Dalglish is the only son of ex-footballer and manager Kenny Dalglish and his wife Marina. Paul's elder sister, Kelly Cates, was born in 1975, like Paul in their parents' home city of Glasgow. Both of Paul's younger sisters were born after their father's August 1977 transfer from Celtic to Liverpool. Subsequent to that transfer, all four siblings were raised living in Southport.

Aged 12, Paul was the Liverpool team mascot in the Liverpool 0–2 Arsenal (26 May 1989) league title deciding defeat.

== Playing career ==
He started his career as a youth player with Celtic before joining Liverpool. However he made no first team appearances for either of his father's former clubs.

Dalglish was then signed by his father for Newcastle United, he made 14 appearances, scoring two goals: one against Tranmere Rovers in the League Cup and one against Sheffield Wednesday in the league. After a successful loan spell, he permanently joined Norwich City in 1999 for £300,000, but failed to establish himself in three years at the club.

Dalglish went on to have spells with Blackpool (scoring two goals: one against Luton Town in the league and one against Barnsley in the FA Cup) and Linfield and loan periods with Scunthorpe and Wigan Athletic.

After this, Dalglish considered a media career, which resulted in finding himself a small part in the movie Goal and also an interview slot on Saturday-morning Sky Sports program Soccer AM, although this was short-lived due to the resurgence of his football career.

After retiring from football for two years, Dalglish was signed by the newly appointed Livingston manager Paul Lambert and, despite struggling near the bottom of the Scottish Premier League, Dalglish impressed, scoring in a narrow 2–1 defeat to Celtic.

Dalglish's performances attracted the attention of Hibernian manager Tony Mowbray, and despite having originally sought a contract extension with Livingston on the final day of the January 2006 transfer window, he joined the Edinburgh club for an undisclosed fee. His first goal for Hibs was a late winner against Kilmarnock in April, and his second and final goal for the club was against Odense in the UEFA Intertoto Cup. After being sidelined with injuries, Dalglish left Hibs in August 2006 to move to the US.

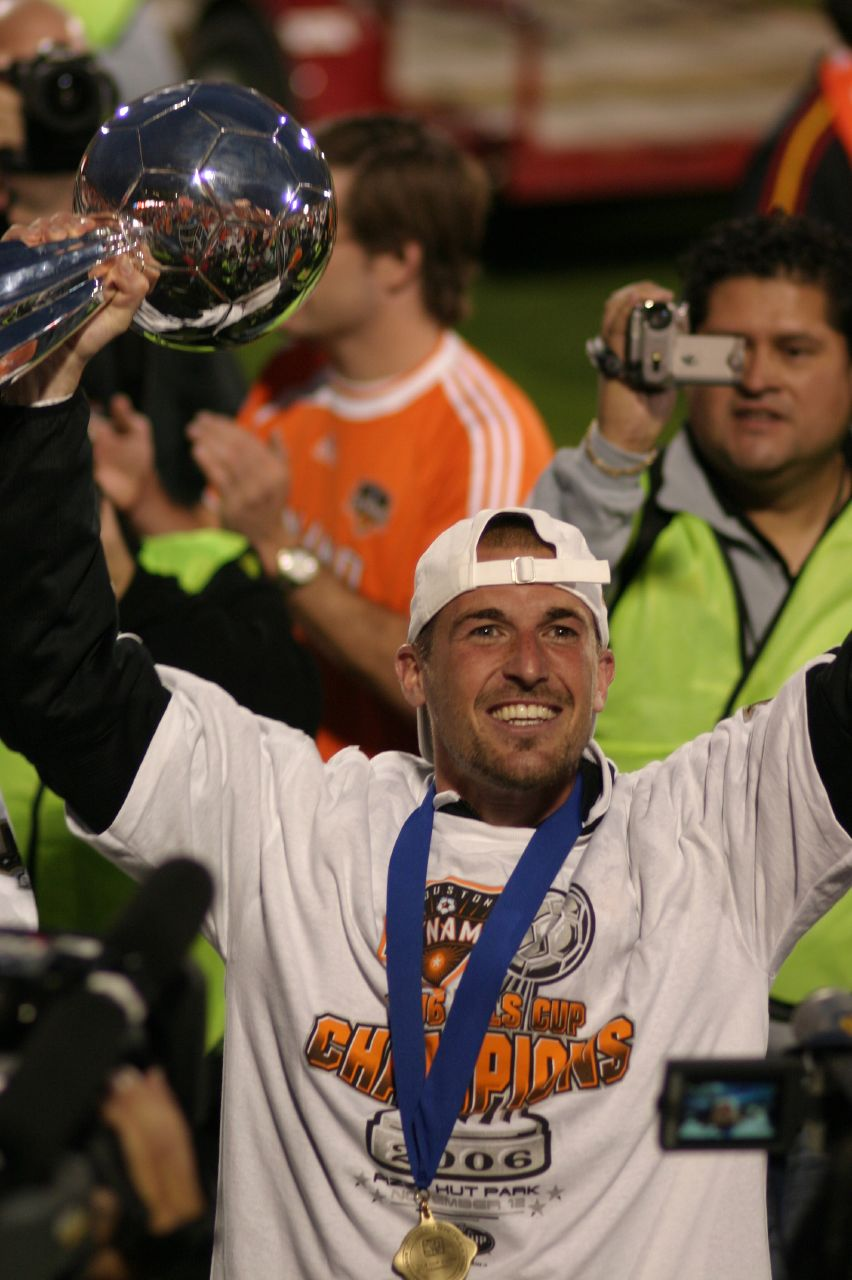
Paul Dalglish with the 2006 MLS Cup trophy

He signed for Major League Soccer side Houston Dynamo. On 5 November 2006, the Dynamo defeated the Colorado Rapids 3–1 in the Western Conference final to earn a spot in its first MLS Cup. Dalglish scored twice and was named Man of the Match. However, he struggled with injuries and was released by Dynamo in the 2007 post-season, after winning two MLS Cups.

He had talks with a few clubs in February 2008 including Scottish club Kilmarnock, with whom he signed a contract until the end of the season. His spell was plagued with injuries again and he retired at the end of the season.

== Coaching career ==
Dalglish began his coaching career in 2008 as a coach at the Houston Dynamo Academy, simultaneously acting as a director at Space City Futbol Club.

On 18 November 2009, Dalglish was named the head coach of FC Tampa Bay, an expansion team in the USSF Division 2 Professional League, the second level of the United States soccer league system. The club got off to a 5-1-3 start but won only 2 of their last 21 matches to fall into last place in the USL conference. Despite their dip in form, FC Tampa Bay were still the most successful expansion team in the 2010 season. Dalglish left the club by mutual consent on 23 September 2010, and team technical director Perry Van der Beck served as interim manager for the last two games of the season.

In 2012, Dalglish became the manager of the Austin Aztex, an expansion club in the USL Premier Development League (USL PDL), the fourth level of the US soccer system. The club finished in the final 8 (of 73 teams) with a final record of 10-6-2 and advanced to the conference finals. The Aztex scored the most and conceded the fewest goals in their conference.

In 2013, Dalglish led the Aztex to the best regular season record in the USL PDL (15-1-2) and won the league championship. The club again scored the most goals in their division and conceded the fewest. Dalglish was named the USL PDL coach of the year. He also served as the technical director for youth powerhouse, Lonestar Soccer Club, which has developed top young MLS prospects such as Kekuta Manneh and Khiry Shelton amongst others.

In 2014, Dalglish joined the coaching staff of Major League Soccer club Real Salt Lake as assistant coach to Jeff Cassar.

In August 2014, Dalglish returned to the Austin Aztex as head coach and technical director. The Aztex had a difficult first year in the United Soccer League when their House Park Stadium was flooded, leaving the team to find a new location to finish the season. This proved to be too much for the Austin Aztex and the team folded at the end of the season.

In November 2015, Dalglish was hired as the head coach and general manager of the NASL club Ottawa Fury FC.

On 14 August 2017, Dalglish left his role at Ottawa Fury, two days after a 3–1 victory over Charlotte Independence. According to the club's president John Pugh, Dalglish had recently informed him that he intended to leave the club for personal reasons at the end of the season. After "soul-searching by Pugh and the rest of Fury FC management", Dalglish and the club came to a mutual agreement to end his contract early.

Dalglish was appointed as the 2nd Head Coach in Miami FC history, taking over from Alessandro Nesta on 25 January 2018. Dalglish led the team to 1st place in the Sunshine Conference Division, scoring the most goals and conceding the fewest, which led to him being named the Sunshine Conference Coach of the Year. Dalglish then followed that up by winning the South Region Conference and then the NPSL National Championship, beating FC Motown 3–1 in the final.

In 2019, it was another clean sweep for Miami FC. Dalglish led the team to 1st place in the Sunshine Conference Division, scoring the most goals and conceding the fewest, the South Region Conference and then the NPSL National Championship, beating the New York Cosmos 3–1 in the final.

He was appointed Miami's general manager on 13 November 2019 and was replaced as head coach with Nelson Vargas. After three losses at the beginning of the USL Championship season, Vargas was let go and replaced by Dalglish as coach. On 15 November 2021 Miami announced that Dalglish had departed the club.

== Honours ==
=== Playing honours ===
Houston Dynamo

- MLS Cup (2): 2006, 2007

=== Managerial honours ===
Austin Aztex

- USL PDL Championship (1): 2013
- USL PDL Southern Conference (1): 2013
- USL PDL Mid-South Division (1): 2013

Miami FC

- NPSL Championship (2): 2018, 2019
- NPSL South Region Championship (2): 2018, 2019
- NPSL Sunshine Conference (2): 2018, 2019
- NISA East Coast Championship (1): 2019

=== Individual ===
- USL PDL Coach of the Year: 2013
