= Felipe Souza (footballer, born 1998) =

Brazilian footballer

Personal information
- Full name: Felipe Souza Ferreyra
- Date of birth: 21 May 1998 (age 28)
- Place of birth: Ferros, Brazil
- Height: 1.87 m (6 ft 1 1/2 in)
- Position: Forward

Team information
- Current team: Bylis
- Number: 20

Youth career
- 2011–2012: America
- 2013–2015: Atlético Mineiro
- 2017: Cruzeiro

Senior career*
Years	Team	Apps	(Gls)
2017–2019	Curicó Unido	1	(0)
2019	→ OFI (loan)	11	(1)
2019–2022	OFI	12	(2)
2021–2022	→ Kifisia (loan)	19	(1)
2022–	Bylis	29	(6)
- * Club domestic league appearances and goals as of 1 June 2024

Felipe Souza Ferreyra (born 21 May 1998) is a Brazilian professional footballer who plays as a forward for Bylis in the Kategoria Superiore.

== Career statistics ==
=== Club ===
As of 3 April 2021

Appearances and goals by club, season and competition
Club	Season	League			National Cup		Continental		Other		Total	
Club	Season	Division	Apps	Goals	Apps	Goals	Apps	Goals	Apps	Goals	Apps	Goals
Curicó Unido	2017	Chilean Primera División	1	0	0	0	—		—		1	0
Curicó Unido	2018	Chilean Primera División	0	0	1 (Note: Appearances in the Copa Chile)	0	—		—		1	0
Curicó Unido	Total		1	0	1	0	—		—		2	0
OFI (loan)	2018–19	Super League Greece	11	1	0	0	—		2 (Note: Appearances in Super League relegation play-offs)	0	13	1
OFI	2019–20	Super League Greece	8	1	2	0	—		—		10	1
OFI	2020–21	Super League Greece	4	0	1	0	0	0	—		5	0
OFI	Total		12	1	3	0	0	0	—		15	1
Career total			24	2	4	0	0	0	2	0	30	2
