= House Park =

High school sports stadium

Coordinates: 30.27798°N 97.749578°W

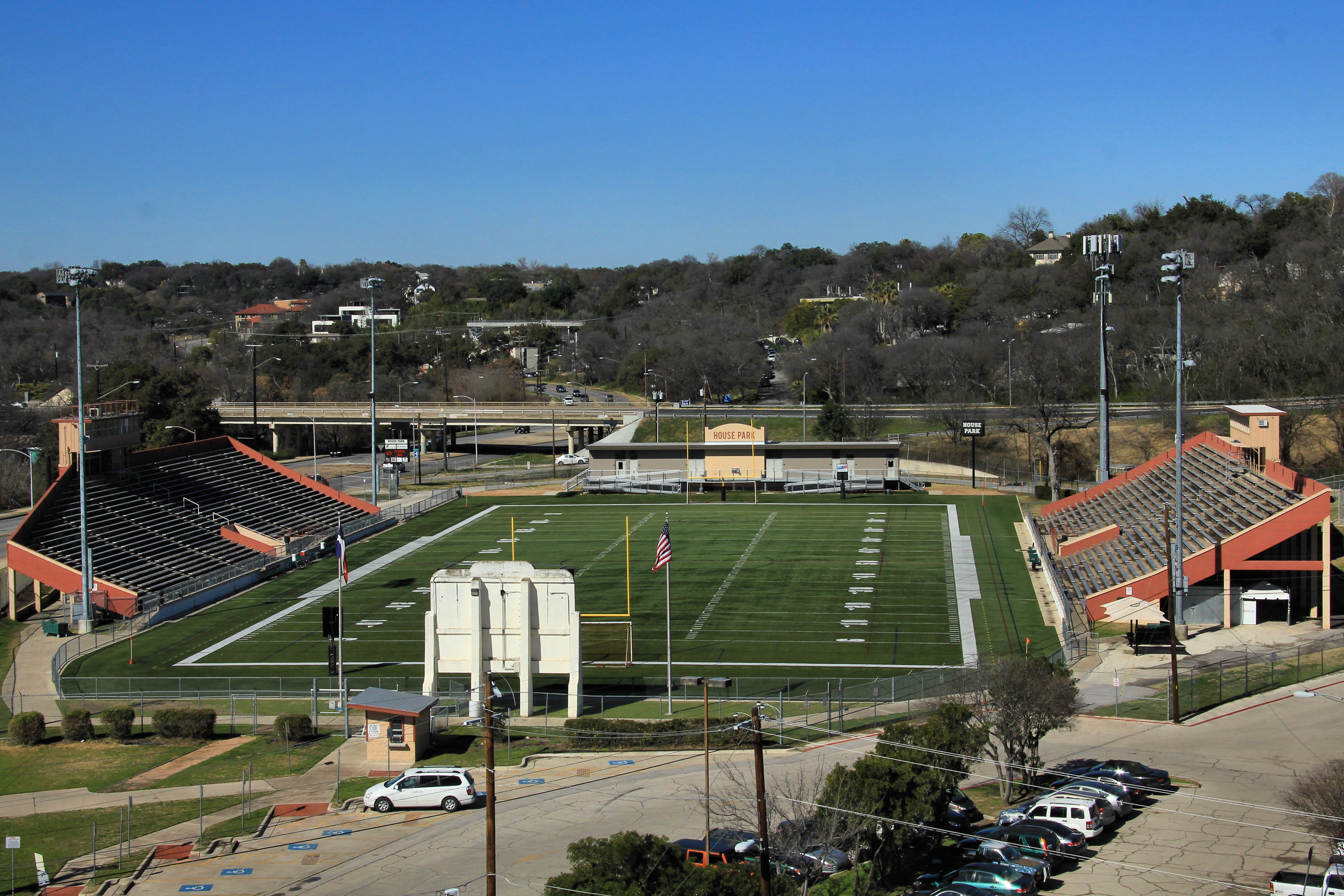
- Interactive map of House Park
- Location: 1301 Shoal Creek Blvd., Austin, Texas
- Capacity: 6,000–6,500
- Surface: Artificial

Construction
- Opened: 1939

Tenants
- Austin ISD (1939-present); Austin Thunder (SISL/USISL) (1989–2000); Austin Lightning (USL PDL) (2007); Austin Aztex FC (USSF D-2) (2010); Austin Aztex (PDL/USL) (2012–2015); Austin Yellow Jackets (IWFL) (2015–present); Austin Sol (AUDL) (2016–present); Austin Rise FC (WPSL) (2023-present)

House Park is a 6,000–6,500 seat sports stadium in Austin, Texas, owned and operated by the Austin Independent School District. Unlike many school districts in Texas, AISD uses multiple shared stadiums including House Park for use in athletic events rather than building a stadium for each high school.

== History ==
On October 31, 1938, the Public Works Administration (PWA) offered the City of Austin a grant not to exceed $613,127 to cover 45% of the costs of school buildings, a stadium and field house, and additions and alterations to existing school buildings, including necessary equipment and acquisition of necessary land under PWA Docket No. Texas-2134-F. House Park was built using a portion of this funding package. Giesecke & Harris designed the project and J. R. Blackmore & Sons built it.

House Park opened in fall 1939 along Shoal Creek, just down the hill from the old campus of Austin High School near downtown. The stadium was built on land donated by Edward M. House, a former diplomat and adviser to Woodrow Wilson. House Park was later dedicated to the memory of the Austin High students that lost their lives serving in World War I and World War II.

== High school sports ==
As of 2012, the stadium still serves as the home stadium for Austin High, as well as Anderson, LASA, McCallum and Navarro High Schools. The absence of a track sets it apart from most other high school stadiums in large cities, but it does also host soccer games and has in the past been the site of the Texas High School Lacrosse Championships.

== Professional sports ==
House Park is the home of Austin Sol, Austin's professional ultimate frisbee team. Their inaugural season home opener was April 9, 2016.

In 2008, the natural grass playing surface was replaced with artificial turf. Fans were able to take patches of the grass turf as souvenirs.

On May 25, 2015, historic flooding along Shoal Creek damaged the stadium and turf forcing the Aztex to search for a temporary home.
