= Austin Aztex =

- Full name: Austin Aztex Football Club
- Nickname: Aztex
- Founded: 2011
- Dissolved: 2017
- Owner: Rene van de Zande; David Markley
- League: Premier Development League
Home colors	Away colors

The Austin Aztex were a soccer team based in Austin, Texas, United States. Founded in 2011 as a member of the Premier Development League, the team played the 2015 season in the United Soccer League, the second tier of the United States soccer pyramid. This was the second team to carry the name Austin Aztex; the first were founded in 2008 and relocated to Orlando in 2010, with that ownership group eventually being awarded an MLS franchise of the same name in that city.

The 'new' Aztex played their home games at the 6,500-seat House Park just west of the downtown Austin core, until that stadium was severely damaged by the 2015 Memorial Day floods; for the remainder of that season, they played at Kelly Reeves Athletic Complex.

On October 2, 2015, the Aztex announced that because neither House Park nor Kelly Reeves met league stadium standards, and due to difficulty in procuring a stadium that met those standards, the team would be on hiatus during the 2016 USL season. The Aztex planned to resume competition in 2018 after the stadium issue was resolved but in the event, did not return to the USL.

USL Championship soccer returned to Austin with the newly formed Austin Bold FC beginning play in 2019 at their own stadium at the Circuit of the Americas. A Major League Soccer franchise was awarded to Precourt Sports Ventures, former owners of Columbus Crew SC, to begin play in 2021 as Austin FC.

== History ==
=== Rebirth of the Aztex ===
The latest incarnation of the Austin Aztex was founded by David Markley, who was a minority owner of the original Aztex. The previous team's majority owners moved the organization to Orlando, Florida at the end of the 2010 season and renamed the team Orlando City SC.

In September 2011, Markley announced plans to create a new Austin Aztex team which would compete in the Premier Development League beginning in the 2012 season. The new Aztex played their first game on May 5, 2012 at Woodforest Bank Stadium, home of the Texas Dutch Lions, and defeated the hosts 4–0. The first Aztex goal was scored by midfielder Tony Rocha on a free kick in the 6th minute of play. The Aztex's first home game was played on May 19, 2012 against the El Paso Patriots before a crowd of 2,507. The Aztex rose to the occasion with a 6–1 win, with Kris Tyrpak providing three of the Aztex's six goals.

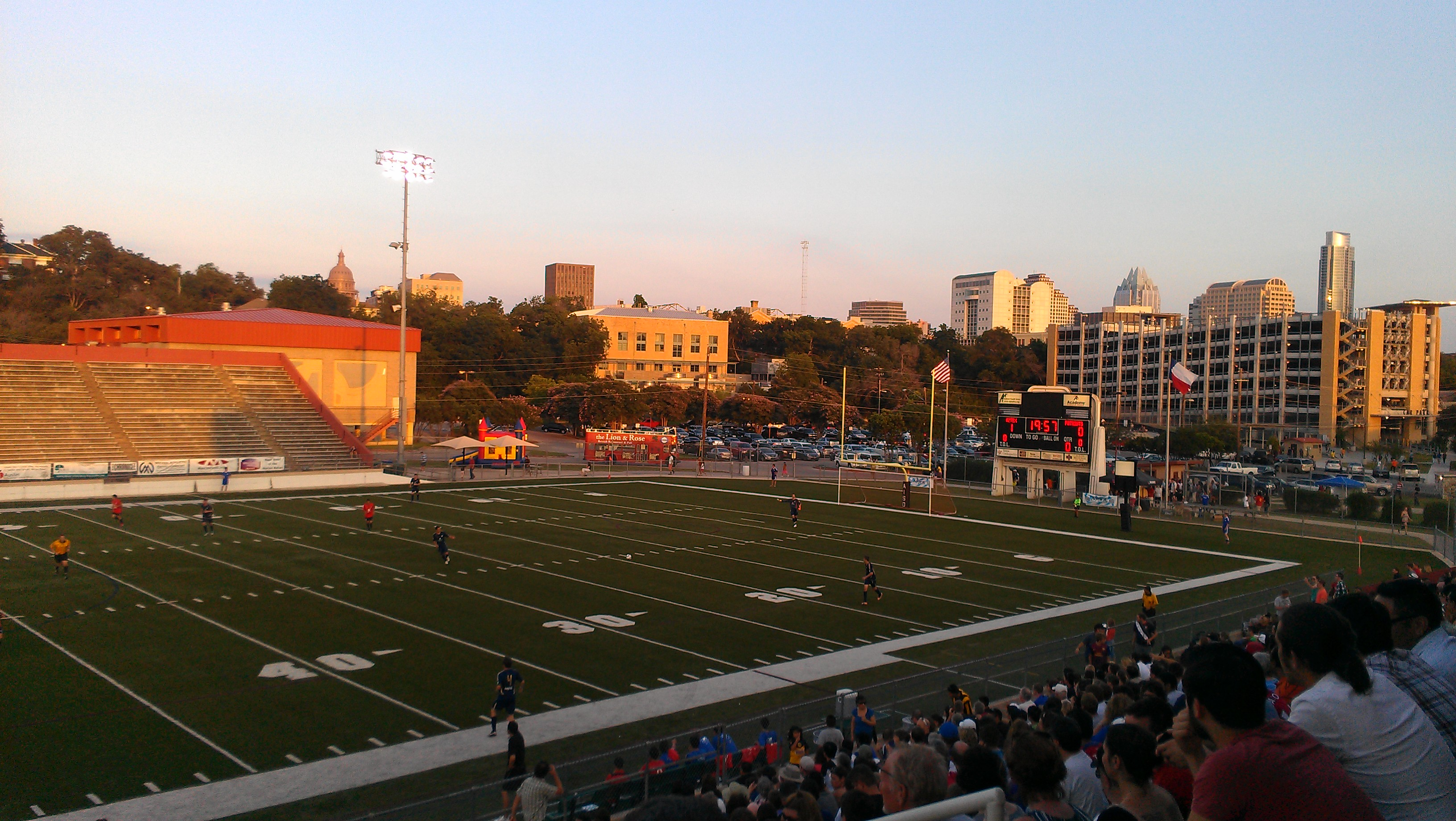
The first Austin Aztex home game, against the El Paso Patriots on May 19, 2012. The downtown Austin skyline and the Texas capitol dome are visible in the background.

The reborn Aztex finished their first season with 9 wins, 5 losses, and 2 draws. They won their first playoff game against the Ocala Stampede but fell to Orlando City U-23's in the Southern Conference final.

In preparation for the move to USL Pro, the Aztex introduced a new logo and affiliated with the Columbus Crew SC, an MLS club which had also recently undergone a logo change.

== Colors and badge ==
The Aztex kits were dark blue with gold numbers and gold trim. Their alternate kits were white with gold trim and numbering. Kits were provided by Admiral Sportswear. Emergo Group, an international regulatory consulting firm headquartered in Austin, served as the team's jersey sponsor from 2012 through 2014.

The Aztex badge was blue and gold with a Texas lone star, a soccer ball, and the word "AzTeX" with an enlarged A, T, and X. "ATX" is shorthand for Austin, Texas.

== Year-by-year ==
Year	Division	League	Regular season	Playoffs	Open Cup	Average Attendance
2012	4	USL PDL	2nd, Mid-South	Conference Finals	did not qualify	1,269 (7th in PDL)
2013	4	USL PDL	1st, Mid-South	Champions	2nd Round	1,438 (6th in PDL) Playoffs: 3,117 Overall: 2,048
2014	4	USL PDL	1st, Mid-South	Conference Finals	2nd Round	1,828 (6th in PDL) Playoffs: 3,491 Overall: 2,197
2015	3	USL	9th, Western	did not qualify	4th Round	3,226
2016	On Hiatus					
2017	Dissolved					

== Honors ==
- USL PDL
  - Champions: 2013
- USL PDL Southern Conference
  - Champions: 2013
- USL PDL Mid-South Division
  - Champions: 2013, 2014

== Head coaches ==
- (Scotland) Paul Dalglish (2012–2014)
- (Mexico) Manuel Buentello (2014)
- (Scotland) Paul Dalglish (2014–2015)

== See also ==
- Austin Lightning
- Austin Aztex FC
- Austin Aztex U23
