= 2015 Arizona United SC season =

Arizona United SC
2015 season
- Owner: Kyle Eng
- Manager: Michael Dellorusso
- Stadium: Scottsdale Stadium
- USL: 10th, Western Conference
- USL Playoffs: Did not qualify
- U.S. Open Cup: 2nd round
- Top goalscorer: Long Tan (14)
- Highest home attendance: 6,108 (Team Record) (April 25 v. Portland)
- Lowest home attendance: League: 1,884 (July 5 v. Orange County); All: 1,408 (Team Record) (May 20 v. Chula Vista FC; USOC 2nd round)
- Average home league attendance: League: 3,304; All: 3,177
| Home colors | Away colors |

The 2015 Arizona United SC season was the club's second season. They played in the Western Conference of the United Soccer League.

== Preseason ==
All times from this point are on Mountain Standard Time (UTC−07:00)

| February 26, 2015 Friendly | Southern Methodist University | 1–2 | Arizona United SC | University Park, Texas |
| 7:30am | | Report | Cuevas (?); Top (?) | Stadium: Westcott Field |

| March 7, 2015 Friendly | Arizona United SC | 1–0 | University of New Mexico | Mesa, Arizona |
| 7:00pm | Rosales 81' | Report | | Stadium: Riggs Stadium; Mesa Community College; Attendance: 1,000+ |

| March 13, 2015 Friendly | Grand Canyon University | 3–1 | Arizona United SC | Phoenix, Arizona |
| 7:30pm | Thomas (yellow card) 15'; Wall 34'; Garcia 59', 86' | Report; Report | Tan 70' | Stadium: GCU Soccer Field |

| March 21, 2015 Nobe Yonekura; Foundation Benefit | Phoenix College | 1–4 | Arizona United SC | Phoenix, Arizona |
| 7:00pm | Valenzuela 9' (pen.); Arrollo (yellow card) 20' | Report | Tan 7'; Granger 64' (pen.); Chin 82'; Malki 89' | Stadium: Hogan Field at Hoy Stadium |

== USL ==
=== Results summary ===
| Overall | | | | | | | | Home | | | | | | Away | | | | | |
| Pld | W | D | L | GF | GA | GD | Pts | W | D | L | GF | GA | GD | W | D | L | GF | GA | GD |
|---|---|---|---|---|---|---|---|---|---|---|---|---|---|---|---|---|---|---|---|
| 28 | 10 | 2 | 16 | 31 | 55 | −24 | 32 | 6 | 1 | 7 | 19 | 21 | −2 | 4 | 1 | 9 | 12 | 34 | −22 |

Source: Match reports

| Round | 1 | 2 | 3 | 4 | 5 | 6 | 7 | 8 | 9 | 10 | 11 | 12 | 13 | 14 | 15 | 16 | 17 | 18 | 19 | 20 | 21 | 22 | 23 | 24 | 25 | 26 | 27 | 28 |
|---|---|---|---|---|---|---|---|---|---|---|---|---|---|---|---|---|---|---|---|---|---|---|---|---|---|---|---|---|
| Stadium | A | A | A | A | H | H | H | H | A | A | H | H | H | A | H | A | A | H | A | A | A | H | H | H | H | A | H | A |
| Result | W | W | W | L | L | L | D | W | L | L | L | W | W | L | W | L | L | L | L | L | W | L | W | W | L | L | L | D |

Updated to match(es) played on September 19, 2015. Source: Match reports
A = Away; H = Home; W = Win; D = Draw; L = Loss

=== League results ===
| March 28, 2015 1 | Orange County Blues | 1–2 | Arizona United SC | Irvine, California |
| 7:00pm | Cortez 36'; Ramirez (yellow card) 37'; Griffiths (yellow card) 41' | Report; Report; Report | Chin 20'; Derschang 23' | Stadium: Anteater Stadium; Attendance: 1,873; Referee: Christopher Calderon |

| April 2, 2015 2 | LA Galaxy II | 1–2 | Arizona United SC | Carson, California |
| 7:30pm | Jamieson 19' | Report; Report; Report | Blanco (yellow card) 39'; Chin 52'; Granger (yellow card) 90'; Tan 90+' | Stadium: StubHub Center; Attendance: 1,352; Referee: Robert Sarfaraz |

| April 11, 2015 3 | Austin Aztex | 0–1 | Arizona United SC | Austin, Texas |
| 7:00pm | Touray (yellow card) 20'; Hoffer (yellow card) 90+' | Report; Report; Report | Tan 49'; Dillon (yellow card) 81' | Stadium: House Park; Attendance: 2,143; Referee: Kyle Phillips |

| April 18, 2015 4 | Orange County Blues | 3–0 | Arizona United SC | Irvine, California |
| 7:00pm | Petričević (yellow card) 21' (goal) 37'; Ramirez 33', 52' | Report; Report; Report | Ruthven (yellow card) 40'; Antúnez (yellow card) 48'; Valentino (yellow card) 72'; Granger (yellow card) 76' | Stadium: Anteater Stadium; Attendance: 968; Referee: Michael Radchuk |

| April 25, 2015 5 | Arizona United SC | 0–2 | Portland Timbers 2 | Scottsdale, Arizona |
| 7:30pm | Top (yellow card) 24' | Report; Report; Report | Clarke (yellow card) 13'; Belmar 19', 43'; Besler (yellow card) 70' | Stadium: Scottsdale Stadium; Attendance: 6,108; Referee: Ramy Touchan |

| May 2, 2015 6 | Arizona United SC | 2–3 | Colorado Springs Switchbacks | Scottsdale, Arizona |
| 7:30pm | Top (yellow card) 5' (goal) 51'; Malki (yellow card) 81'; Shinsky (yellow card) 90'; Cuevas 90+' | Report; Report; Report | Phillips (yellow card) 3' (red card) 71'; King 4'; Harada (yellow card) 22' (red card) 52'; Gorrick (yellow card) 31'; Vercollone 33' (pen.) (yellow card) 68'; Gonzalez (yellow card) 42'; Robinson 45'; Bejarano (yellow card) 82'; Hunter (yellow card) 90+'; Argueta (yellow card) 90+' | Stadium: Scottsdale Stadium; Attendance: 3,088; Referee: Daniel Radford |

| May 9, 2015 7 | Arizona United SC | 1–1 | Tulsa Roughnecks FC | Scottsdale, Arizona |
| 7:30pm | Top 21' (yellow card) 39'; Ruthven (yellow card) 45+'; Valentino (yellow card) 67' | Report; Report; Report | Venter (yellow card) 33'; Nwabueze (yellow card) 56'; Bardsley 89' | Stadium: Scottsdale Stadium; Attendance: 2,858; Referee: Marco Vega |

| May 16, 2015 8 | Arizona United SC | 3–2 | Austin Aztex | Scottsdale, Arizona |
| 7:30pm | Stisser 35' (pen.); Tan 47', 69' (pen.); Vickers (yellow card) 78'; Shinsky (yellow card) 81' | Report; Report; Report | Tyrpak 8'; Caesar 14'; Guaraci (yellow card) 35'; Ryden (yellow card) 68' | Stadium: Scottsdale Stadium; Attendance: 3,229; Referee: Marco Vega |

| May 23, 2015 9 | Colorado Springs Switchbacks | 5–0 | Arizona United SC | Colorado Springs, Colorado |
| 7:00pm | Seth (yellow card) 29'; Vercollone 49', 89' (yellow card) 73'; Robinson 75' (yellow card) 76'; Gonzalez 85'; Maybin 87' | Report; Report; Report | Ruthven (yellow card) 29'; Malki (yellow card) 74' | Stadium: Sand Creek Stadium; Attendance: 2,200; Referee: Miguel Urbina-Barrios |

| May 31, 2015 10 | Vancouver Whitecaps 2 | 2–0 | Arizona United SC | Vancouver, British Columbia |
| 2:00pm | Clarke 49'; Froese (yellow card) 57'; Levis 76'; Dean (yellow card) 89' | Report; Report; Report | Top (yellow card) 39'; Blanco (yellow card) 81'; Morrison (yellow card) 83' | Stadium: Thunderbird Stadium; Attendance: 1,502; Referee: Juan Marquez (Canada) |

| June 13, 2015 11 | Arizona United SC | 1–2 | Sacramento Republic FC | Scottsdale, Arizona |
| 7:30pm | Tan 9'; Garcia (yellow card) 43' | Report; Report; Report | Cazarez 76'; Barrera 83' | Stadium: Scottsdale Stadium; Attendance: 3,318; Referee: Bernhard Hosu |

| June 20, 2015 12 | Arizona United SC | 2–1 | Seattle Sounders 2 | Scottsdale, Arizona |
| 7:30pm | Top 60'; Tan 63'; Morrison (yellow card) 81' | Report; Report; Report | Miele 19'; McCormick (yellow card) 33' (red card) 59'; Garza (yellow card) 54'; Frano (yellow card) 66'; Sanyang (yellow card) 89'; Craven (yellow card) 90+' | Stadium: Scottsdale Stadium; Attendance: 3,144; Referee: Andrew Musashe |

| June 27, 2015 13 | Arizona United SC | 2–1 | Real Monarchs | Scottsdale, Arizona |
| 7:30pm | Tan (yellow card) 41' (goal) 54'; Granger (yellow card) 68'; Antúnez (yellow card) 82'; Morrison 90+' | Report; Report; Report | Rauhofer (yellow card) 18'; Schuler (yellow card) 34'; Velazco (yellow card) 37'; Orozco (yellow card) 41'; Copeland 83' | Stadium: Scottsdale Stadium; Attendance: 3,068; Referee: Chipalo Street |

| July 2, 2015 14 | Portland Timbers 2 | 3–1 | Arizona United SC | Portland, Oregon |
| 7:00pm | Belmar 10'; Safiu 14'; Gavin (yellow card) 38'; Thoma (yellow card) 53'; Payne (yellow card) 84'; Casiple 85' | Report; Report; Report | Ruthven (yellow card) 24'; Valentino (yellow card) 48'; Malki 74'; Blanco (yellow card) 89' | Stadium: Merlo Field; Attendance: 2,410; Referee: Chipalo Street |

| July 5, 2015 15 | Arizona United SC | 2–0 | Orange County Blues | Scottsdale, Arizona |
| 7:30pm | Malki (yellow card) 2'; Morrison 40'; Cuevas 90+' | Report; Report; Report | Ramírez (yellow card) 71'; Cortez (yellow card) 87' | Stadium: Scottsdale Stadium; Attendance: 1,884; Referee: Matthew Lavergne |

| July 12, 2015 16 | Seattle Sounders 2 | 4–0 | Arizona United SC | Tukwila, Washington |
| 5:00pm | Anderson 2', 14'; Long 37'; Rossi 58' (yellow card) 68' | Report; Report; Report | Dillon (yellow card) 33'; Granger (yellow card) 36' | Stadium: Starfire Sports Complex; Attendance: 2,051; Referee: Farhad Dadkho |

| July 17, 2015 17 | Austin Aztex | 4–1 | Arizona United SC | Austin, Texas |
| 7:00pm | King 18'; Caesar 22', 41'; Cuero (yellow card) 23'; Touray 82' | Report; Report; Report | Garcia (yellow card) 13'; Dillon (yellow card) 20'; Valentino (yellow card) 33'; Tan 65' | Stadium: Kelly Reeves Athletic Complex; Attendance: 3,361; Referee: Michael Lavergne |

| July 25, 2015 18 | Arizona United SC | 0–1 | Austin Aztex | Scottsdale, Arizona |
| 7:30pm | Granger (yellow card) 55'; Morrison (yellow card) 67'; Top (yellow card) 78' | Report; Report; Report | Tyrpak 6'; Yates (yellow card) 84'; Perales (yellow card) 90+' | Stadium: Scottsdale Stadium; Attendance: 3,314; Referee: Ramy Touchan |

| July 31, 2015 19 | Oklahoma City Energy FC | 3–0 | Arizona United SC | Oklahoma City, Oklahoma |
| 6:00pm | König 56' (pen.), 80'; Evans (yellow card) 45+' (goal) 90+'; Gonzalez (yellow card) 90+' | Report; Report; Report | Tan (yellow card) 35'; Okafor (yellow card) 43'; Johnson (yellow card) 82' | Stadium: Taft Stadium; Attendance: 3,976; Referee: Rosendo Mendoza |

| August 2, 2015 20 | Tulsa Roughnecks FC | 6–3 | Arizona United SC | Tulsa, Oklahoma |
| 6:30pm | Bond (yellow card) 3'; Black 13'; Mata 33'; Ochoa 38', 72' (pen.); Ballew 67'; Manhebo (yellow card) 86'; Bell 90+' | Report; Report; Report | Cuevas 25'; Top (yellow card) 31'; Filipović (yellow card) 32'; Tan 58' (pen.), 68'; Granger (yellow card) 71' | Stadium: ONEOK Field; Attendance: 4,023; Referee: Jose Lara |

| August 9, 2015 21 | LA Galaxy II | 1–2 | Arizona United SC | Carson, California |
| 4:00pm | Steres (yellow card) 23' (red card) 89'; Sorto (yellow card) 45+'; Auras (yellow card) 60' (goal) 65'; Covarrubias (yellow card) 71'; Vera (yellow card) 81' (red card) 82'; Diop (yellow card) 90+' | Report; Report; Report | Ruthven (yellow card) 28'; Tan 31'; Chin 32'; Johnson (yellow card) 45'; Dillon (yellow card) 90+'; Malki (yellow card) 90+' | Stadium: StubHub Center; Referee: Esteban Rosano |

| August 15, 2015 22 | Arizona United SC | 0–3 | Orange County Blues | Scottsdale, Arizona |
| 7:30pm | Cuevas (yellow card) 57' | Report; Report; Report | Santana 35'; Felix (yellow card) 64'; McCracken (yellow card) 71'; Slager 78'; Popara 90+' | Stadium: Scottsdale Stadium; Attendance: 2,588; Referee: Ramy Touchan |

| August 22, 2015 23 | Arizona United SC | 2–0 | Vancouver Whitecaps 2 | Scottsdale, Arizona |
| 7:30pm | Ruthven (yellow card) 22'; Tan 49'; Dillon (yellow card) 60'; Dennis 83' | Report; Report; Report | Adekugbe (yellow card) 16'; Froese (yellow card) 25'; Seymore (yellow card) 52'; Blasco (yellow card) 67' | Stadium: Scottsdale Stadium; Attendance: 3,223; Referee: Luis Guardia |

| August 29, 2015 24 | Arizona United SC | 2–1 | LA Galaxy II | Scottsdale, Arizona |
| 7:30pm | Tan 41'; Garcia (yellow card) 45+'; Dennis (red card) 80'; Malki (yellow card) 82'; Tshuma 90' | Report; Report; Report | Auras (yellow card) 37'; Olivera 75' | Stadium: Scottsdale Stadium; Attendance: 4,241; Referee: Robert Hullner |

| September 5, 2015 25 | Arizona United SC | 2–3 | Real Monarchs | Scottsdale, Arizona |
| 7:30pm | Rosales (yellow card) 39'; Ruthven 45'; Top (yellow card) 65'; Tan 75' | Report; Report; Report | Kavita 18'; Rauhofer 29'; Sundly 60'; Fernández (yellow card) 90+'; Arnone (yellow card) 90+' | Stadium: Scottsdale Stadium; Attendance: 3,314; Referee: Juan Colazo |

| September 12, 2015 26 | Real Monarchs | 1–0 | Arizona United SC | Sandy, Utah |
| 4:00pm | Rauhofer 13'; Celestino (yellow card) 90+' | Report; Report; Report | Ruthven (yellow card) 82'; Zea (yellow card) 89' | Stadium: Rio Tinto Stadium; Attendance: 7,705; Referee: Esteban Rosano |

| September 16, 2015 27 | Arizona United SC | 0–1 | Oklahoma City Energy FC | Scottsdale, Arizona |
| 7:30pm | Filipović (yellow card) 40' | Report; Report; Report | Gonzalez 41'; Duke (yellow card) 63'; Hedrick (yellow card) 85' | Stadium: Scottsdale Stadium; Attendance: 2,877; Referee: Esteban Rosano |

| September 19, 2015 28 | Sacramento Republic FC | 0–0 | Arizona United SC | Sacramento, California |
| 7:30pm | Klimenta (yellow card) 43' | Report; Report; Report | Granger (yellow card) 90'; Top (yellow card) 90+' | Stadium: Bonney Field; Attendance: 11,442; Referee: Bernhard Hosu |

=== Western Conference standings ===
| Pos | Team | Pld | W | D | L | GF | GA | GD | Pts |
|---|---|---|---|---|---|---|---|---|---|
| 8 | Portland Timbers 2 | 28 | 11 | 2 | 15 | 38 | 45 | −7 | 35 |
| 9 | Austin Aztex | 28 | 10 | 3 | 15 | 32 | 41 | −9 | 33 |
| 10 | Arizona United | 28 | 10 | 2 | 16 | 31 | 55 | −24 | 32 |
| 11 | Vancouver Whitecaps 2 | 28 | 8 | 6 | 14 | 39 | 53 | −14 | 30 |
| 12 | Real Monarchs | 28 | 7 | 8 | 13 | 32 | 42 | −10 | 29 |

Source: 2015 USL schedule
Rules for classification: 1) head-to-head; 2) total wins; 3) total goal differential; 4) total goals scored; 5) disciplinary points; 6) away goals scored; 7) away goal differential; 8) home goals scored; 9) home goal differential; 10) coin toss or drawing of lots

== U.S. Open Cup ==
| May 20, 2015 Second round | Arizona United SC | 0–3 | Chula Vista FC | Scottsdale, Arizona |
| 7:30pm | Top (yellow card) 69' | Report | Diaz 36', 71'; Pinal 48'; Fuentes (yellow card) 81' | Stadium: Scottsdale Stadium; Attendance: 1,408 |

== Statistics ==
| # | Pos. | Name | GP | GS | Min. | Goals | Assists | A yellow rectangle, denoting the yellow penalty card shown to a player being cautioned | A red rectangle, denoting the red penalty card shown to a player being sent off |
|---|---|---|---|---|---|---|---|---|---|
| 29 | FW | (China) Long Tan | 27 | 27 | 2,423 | 14 | 2 | 2 | 0 |
| 9 | FW | (United States) (Guatemala) Jonathan Top | 23 | 20 | 1,725 | 3 | 3 | 8 | 0 |
| 15 | FW | (Jamaica) Dennis Chin | 20 | 16 | 1,475 | 3 | 3 | 0 | 0 |
| 10 | MF | (United States) Jose Cuevas | 21 | 16 | 1,372 | 3 | 2 | 1 | 0 |
| 23 | DF | (Scotland) Scott Morrison | 27 | 22 | 1,953 | 2 | 0 | 3 | 0 |
| 2 | DF | (United States) Tyler Ruthven | 23 | 23 | 2,012 | 1 | 1 | 7 | 0 |
| 8 | MF | (United States) George Malki | 24 | 11 | 1,120 | 1 | 0 | 5 | 0 |
| 17 | FW | (United States) Brad Stisser | 16 | 8 | 838 | 1 | 2 | 0 | 0 |
| 7 | MF | (United States) Robbie Derschang | 16 | 7 | 501 | 1 | 0 | 0 | 0 |
| 28 | FW | (United States) Aaron Dennis | 7 | 3 | 357 | 1 | 0 | 0 | 1 |
| 22 | FW | (Zimbabwe) Schillo Tshuma | 6 | 0 | 139 | 1 | 0 | 0 | 0 |
| 3 | DF | (United States) Damian Rosales | 22 | 19 | 1,650 | 0 | 2 | 1 | 0 |
| 12 | MF | (United States) Joey Dillon | 22 | 18 | 1,607 | 0 | 0 | 5 | 0 |
| 22 | DF | (United States) Rob Valentino | 15 | 15 | 1,295 | 0 | 0 | 4 | 0 |
| 21 | MF | (United States) Milton Blanco | 15 | 12 | 1,026 | 0 | 1 | 3 | 0 |
| 6 | DF | (United States) Brock Granger | 17 | 10 | 946 | 0 | 0 | 7 | 0 |
| 33 | DF | (Colombia) Eduard Zea | 12 | 9 | 921 | 0 | 0 | 1 | 0 |
| 11 | MF | (United States) Danny Garcia | 15 | 12 | 834 | 0 | 1 | 3 | 0 |
| 37 | DF | (Germany) Romeo Filipović | 10 | 9 | 805 | 0 | 0 | 2 | 0 |
| 20 | MF | (England) Otis Earle | 6 | 4 | 427 | 0 | 2 | 0 | 0 |
| 5 | DF | (United States) Daniel Antúnez | 11 | 3 | 358 | 0 | 0 | 2 | 0 |
| 19 | MF | (United States) Spencer Johnson | 6 | 5 | 355 | 0 | 0 | 2 | 0 |
| 14 | MF | (United States) Alex Shinsky | 6 | 4 | 345 | 0 | 0 | 2 | 0 |
| 11 | MF | (Spain) Victor Muñoz | 3 | 3 | 234 | 0 | 1 | 0 | 0 |
| 16 | FW | (England) Jordan Rideout | 7 | 1 | 192 | 0 | 0 | 0 | 0 |
| 21 | MF | (United States) Jon Okafor | 4 | 2 | 177 | 0 | 0 | 1 | 0 |
| 13 | MF | (United States) Cameron Vickers | 6 | 0 | 104 | 0 | 1 | 1 | 0 |
| 4 | DF | (United States) Devon Grousis | 1 | 0 | 17 | 0 | 0 | 0 | 0 |

=== Goalkeepers ===
| # | Name | GP | GS | Min. | SV | GA | GAA | SO | A yellow rectangle, denoting the yellow penalty card shown to a player being cautioned | A red rectangle, denoting the red penalty card shown to a player being sent off |
|---|---|---|---|---|---|---|---|---|---|---|
| 1 | (United States) Carl Woszczynski | 27 | 27 | 2,430 | 130 | 52 | 1.925 | 4 | 0 | 0 |
| 24 | (United States) Jacole Turner | 1 | 1 | 90 | 2 | 3 | 3.000 | 0 | 0 | 0 |

== Transfers ==
=== Loan in ===
| Start date | End date | Position | No. | Player | From club |
|---|---|---|---|---|---|
| April 27, 2015 | September 21, 2015 | Midfielder | 11 | (United States) Danny Garcia | (United States) FC Dallas |
| June 18, 2015 | September 21, 2015 | Defender | 33 | (England) Otis Earle | (United States) FC Dallas |
| July 29, 2015 | August 21, 2015 | Midfielder | 21 | (United States) Jon Okafor | (United States) Atlanta Silverbacks |
| August 20, 2015 | September 21, 2015 | Forward | 22 | (Zimbabwe) Schillo Tshuma | (United States) Major League Soccer |

=== Loan out ===
| Start date | End date | Position | No. | Player | To club |
|---|---|---|---|---|---|
| September 22, 2015 | November 5, 2015 | Forward | 29 | (China) Long Tan | (United States) Tampa Bay Rowdies |

== See also ==
- 2015 in American soccer
- 2015 USL season
- Arizona United SC
