= 2015 Colorado Springs Switchbacks FC season =

Colorado Springs Switchbacks FC
2015 season
- President: Nick Ragain
- Manager: Steve Trittschuh
- Stadium: Sand Creek Stadium
- USL Pro Playoffs: TBD
- U.S. Open Cup: 4th round
- Top goalscorer: Luke Vercollone (7)
- Highest home attendance: 3,726 (June 10 vs. Portland 2)
- Lowest home attendance: League: 2,012 (June 13 vs. Real Monarchs) (June 24 vs. Orange County); All: 679 (May 20 vs. Harpo's)
- Average home league attendance: League: 2,484; All: 2,258
Home colours	Away colours

The 2015 Colorado Springs Switchbacks FC season was the club's first season of existence, and their first season in the United Soccer League, the third division of the American soccer pyramid. The Switchbacks played in the Western Conference of USL.

== Competitions ==
=== Preseason ===
February 28 Scrimmage	Air Force Falcons	1–2	Colorado Springs Switchbacks FC	Colorado Springs, Colorado
				Stadium: Cadet Soccer Stadium

March 7 Friendly	CSU–Pueblo ThunderWolves	0–1	Colorado Springs Switchbacks FC	Pueblo, Colorado
			King	Stadium: Rawling Soccer Complex

March 14 Friendly	Colorado Springs Switchbacks FC	2–1	UCCS Mountain Lions	Colorado Springs, Colorado
	Durr 48'; King 57'; Burt (yellow card) 81'	Report	Berkson	Stadium: Sand Creek Stadium

March 18 Friendly	Colorado Springs Switchbacks FC	0–1	Real Monarchs SLC	Grand Junction, Colorado
7:00pm MDT		Report	Velazco 61'	Stadium: Walker Field; Referee: Alex Krelo; Assistant referees: Kali Smith; Jay Hutchinson

=== USL ===
March 28 1	Austin Aztex	2–0	Colorado Springs Switchbacks FC	Austin, Texas
19:00 MT	Touray 40'; King (yellow card) 60'; Caesar 80'	Report	Maybin (yellow card) 29'; Bejarano (yellow card) 55'; Badr (yellow card) 65'	Stadium: House Park; Attendance: 4,105; Referee: Luis Guardia

April 4 2	Colorado Springs Switchbacks FC	1–2	Oklahoma City Energy FC	Colorado Springs, Colorado
13:00 MT	Harada (yellow card) 23'; Burt (yellow card) 48' (yellow-red card) 57'; Badr (yellow card) 58'; Seth 68'	Report	Lopez (yellow card) 12'; König 35', 90+'; Evans (yellow card) 58'	Stadium: Sand Creek Stadium; Attendance: 2,990; Referee: Adam Finney

April 11 3	Real Monarchs SLC	0–1	Colorado Springs Switchbacks FC	Sandy, Utah
16:30 MT	Baldin (yellow card) 17'	Report	Harada (yellow card) 28'; Seth 29', (yellow card) 30'; N. Robinson (yellow card) 82'	Stadium: Rio Tinto Stadium; Attendance: 3,310; Referee: Brad Jensen

April 17 4	Colorado Springs Switchbacks FC	5–2	Real Monarchs SLC	Colorado Springs, Colorado
19:00 MT	Gonzalez 12'; Vercollone (yellow card) 17', (goal) 25' (pen.), 90' (pen.); S. Robinson 42'; Harada (yellow card) 45'; Maybin 88'; Armstrong (yellow card) 90'	Report	Tavares 18'; Sundly (yellow card) 61'; Rauhofer 88'	Stadium: Sand Creek Stadium; Attendance: 2,100; Referee: Younes Marrakcji

April 25 5	Austin Aztex	1–0	Colorado Springs Switchbacks FC	Austin, Texas
19:00 MT	Tyrpak 9'	Report		Stadium: House Park; Attendance: 2,925; Referee: Leszek Stalmach

May 2 6	Arizona United SC	2–3	Colorado Springs Switchbacks FC	Scottsdale, Arizona
20:30 MT	Top (yellow card) 5', (goal) 51'; Malki (yellow card) 81'; Cuevas 90+'	Report	Phillips (yellow card) 72' (yellow card) (yellow-red card); King 4'; Harada (yellow card) 22' (yellow-red card) 52'; Gorrick (yellow card) 31'; Vercollone 33' (pen.), (yellow card) 68'; Gonzalez (yellow card) 42'; Seth 45'; Bejarano (yellow card) 82'; Argueta (yellow card) 90'	Stadium: Scottsdale Stadium; Attendance: 3,088; Referee: Daniel Radford

May 13 7	Orange County Blues FC	3–1	Colorado Springs Switchbacks FC	Irvine, California
20:30 MT	Ramírez 38', 80', (yellow card) 75'; Griffiths 57'	Report	Greer 50'; S. Robinson (yellow card) 55'; Seth (yellow card) 83'	Stadium: Anteater Stadium; Attendance: 674; Referee: Robert Sarfaraz

May 23 8	Colorado Springs Switchbacks FC	5–0	Arizona United SC	Colorado Springs, Colorado
19:00 MT	Seth (yellow card) 29'; Vercollone 49', 89', (yellow card) 73'; S. Robinson 75', (yellow card) 76'; Gonzalez 85'; Maybin 87'	Report	Ruthven (yellow card) 29'; Malki (yellow card) 74'	Stadium: Sand Creek Stadium; Attendance: 2,200; Referee: M. Urbina-Barrios

May 30 9	LA Galaxy II	2–1	Colorado Springs Switchbacks FC	Carson, California
20:30 MT	Auras (yellow card) 12'; Bowen (yellow card) 37'; Steres 45+'; Mendiola (yellow card) 82', (goal) 90+'	Report	Gonzalez 17'; Gorrick (yellow card) 90+'	Stadium: StubHub Center Track & Field Stadium; Attendance: 635

June 6 10	Colorado Springs Switchbacks FC	3–0	Whitecaps FC 2	Colorado Springs, Colorado
19:00 MT	King 41'; Vercollone 78'; Maybin 83'; Phillips (yellow card) 88'	Report		Stadium: Sand Creek Stadium; Attendance: 2,348; Referee: Adam Zarrin

June 10 11	Colorado Springs Switchbacks FC	3–1	Portland Timbers 2	Colorado Springs, Colorado
19:00 MT	Gonzalez 25', 35'; Harada 47'; Bejarano (yellow card) 90'	Report	Safiu (yellow card) 76'; Richards 84'	Stadium: Sand Creek Stadium; Attendance: 3,726; Referee: Karen Abt

June 13 12	Colorado Springs Switchbacks FC	2–1	Real Monarchs SLC	Colorado Springs, Colorado
19:00 MT	Gonzalez 10'; Burt (yellow card) 19'; Harada 30'	Report	Baldin (yellow card) 21'; Rauhofer 45' (pen.), (yellow card) 72'	Stadium: Sand Creek Stadium; Attendance: 2,012; Referee: Adam Finney

June 19 13	Saint Louis FC	0–1	Colorado Springs Switchbacks FC	Fenton, Missouri
18:30 MT		Report	Argueta 15'; Gonzalez (yellow card) 85'	Stadium: World Wide Technology Soccer Park; Attendance: 4,742; Referee: Dimitar Chavdarov

June 24 14	Colorado Springs Switchbacks FC	5–0	Orange County Blues FC	Colorado Springs, Colorado
19:00 MT	King 18', 40'; Argueta (yellow card) 33'; Vercollone 57' (pen.); Hunter 59'; Seth 69'	Report	Suggs (yellow card) 25'; Crettenand (yellow card) 45+'; Payeras (yellow card) 64'	Stadium: Sand Creek Stadium; Attendance: 2,012; Referee: Younes Marrackhi

July 3 15	Colorado Springs Switchbacks FC	2-0	Austin Aztex	Colorado Springs, Colorado
20:00 MT	Gonzalez 53' 79'; King (yellow card) 74'	Report	Rozeboom (yellow card) 33'	Stadium: Sand Creek Stadium; Attendance: 3,024; Referee: (United States) Tyler Mitcham

July 11 16	Tulsa Roughnecks FC	3-1	Colorado Springs Switchbacks FC	Tulsa, Oklahoma
18:30 MT	Venter; Nwabueze; Ballew	Report	Vercollone	Stadium: ONEOK Field

July 15 17	Whitecaps FC 2	2-2	Colorado Springs Switchbacks FC	Vancouver, British Columbia
20:00 MT	Bustos 18'; Rodríguez (yellow card) 43'; Lewis 50'; McKendry (yellow card) 72'	Summary	Phillips 10'; King 45' (pen.)	Stadium: Thunderbird Stadium; Attendance: 2,513; Referee: (Canada) Kent Waechter

July 18 18	Colorado Springs Switchbacks FC	1 - 1	Seattle Sounders FC 2	Colorado Springs, Colorado
19:00 MT	King 9'; Harada (yellow card) 37'; Bejarano (yellow card) 51'; Argueta (yellow card) 90'	Summary	Lowe (yellow card) 45'; Sérgio Mota 61' (red card) 88'	Stadium: Sand Creek Stadium; Attendance: 3,563; Referee: (United States) Mark Sauro

July 31 19	Colorado Springs Switchbacks FC	v	LA Galaxy II	Colorado Springs, Colorado
19:00 MT				Stadium: Sand Creek Stadium

August 5 20	Colorado Springs Switchbacks FC	v	Tulsa Roughnecks FC	Colorado Springs, Colorado
19:00 MT				Stadium: Sand Creek Stadium

August 8 21	Sacramento Republic FC	v	Colorado Springs Switchbacks FC	Sacramento, California
21:00 MT				Stadium: Bonney Field

August 14 22	Colorado Springs Switchbacks FC	v	Sacramento Republic FC	Colorado Springs, Colorado
19:00 MT				Stadium: Sand Creek Stadium

August 19 23	Seattle Sounders FC 2	v	Colorado Springs Switchbacks FC	Tukwila, Washington
20:30 MT				Stadium: Starfire Sports Complex

August 26 24	Real Monarchs SLC	v	Colorado Springs Switchbacks FC	Sandy, Utah
19:00 MT				Stadium: Rio Tinto Stadium

September 5 25	Portland Timbers 2	v	Colorado Springs Switchbacks FC	Portland, Oregon
16:00 MT				Stadium: Merlo Field

September 9 26	Colorado Springs Switchbacks FC	v	Austin Aztex	Colorado Springs, Colorado
19:00 MT				Stadium: Sand Creek Stadium

September 12 27	Oklahoma City Energy FC	v	Colorado Springs Switchbacks FC	Oklahoma City, Oklahoma
18:00 MT				Stadium: Taft Stadium

September 19 28	Colorado Springs Switchbacks FC	v	LA Galaxy II	Colorado Springs, Colorado
19:00 MT				Stadium: Sand Creek Stadium

=== U.S. Open Cup ===
May 20 Third round	Colorado Springs Switchbacks	2–1	(Colorado) Harpo's	Colorado Springs, Colorado
19:00 MT	Maybin 1', 35'; Argueta (yellow card) 66' (yellow-red card) 76'	Report	Haber 49'; Cullen (yellow card) 70'	Stadium: Sand Creek Stadium; Attendance: 679; Referee: Hamed Sadeghi

June 16 Fourth round	Colorado Rapids	4–1	Colorado Springs Switchbacks	Commerce City, Colorado
19:00 MT	Badji 26'; Greenspan 32'; Serna 65', (yellow card) 71', (goal) 90+3'	Report	Bejarano (yellow card) 61'; Phillips (red card) 61'; Burt 90+1'	Stadium: Dick's Sporting Goods Park; Attendance: 1,727; Referee: Chipalo Street (Washington)
