= 2015 Real Monarchs season =

Real Monarchs SLC
2015 season
- Owner: Dell Loy Hansen
- Head coach: Freddy Juarez
- Stadium: Rio Tinto Stadium
- USL Pro Playoffs: TBD
- U.S. Open Cup: TBD
- Top goalscorer: Max Rauhofer (6)
- Highest home attendance: 13,979 (Aug 28 vs. Seattle)
- Lowest home attendance: League: 1,001 (Apr. 25 vs. Galaxy II); All: 90 (May 27 vs. Colorado Springs)
- Average home league attendance: League: 2,494; All: 2,138

The 2015 Real Monarchs SLC season was the club's first season of existence. Real Monarchs SLC competed in the United Soccer League, the third tier of the American soccer pyramid. The season began on March 22 and concluded on September 12.

== Background ==
The Monarchs entered 2015 as one of 13 new clubs in the USL. The club was created as the USL affiliate for Real Salt Lake of Major League Soccer.

== Players ==
As of May 8, 2015

No.	Position	Player	Nation
4	DF	USA	Riley McGovern
5	MF	BRA	Lennon Celestino
6	MF	USA	Alec Sundly
7	FW	GNB	Eti Tavares
9	FW	URU	Max Rauhofer
10	MF	USA	Ricardo Velazco
11	FW	GUY	Emery Welshman
12	DF	SLV	Marvin Baumgartner
13	MF	USA	Garrett Losee
14	FW	USA	Leon Brown
15	DF	CAN	Jordan Murrell
17	GK	USA	Victor Rodriguez
18	MF	BRA	Lucas Baldin
19	MF	USA	Tyler Arnone
20	DF	USA	Emilio Orozco
22	DF	USA	Darion Copeland
23	MF	USA	Coco Navarro
24	GK	USA	Eric Osswald
28	MF	SLV	Maikon Orellana
33	MF	CAN	David Alva

== Competitions ==
=== Preseason ===
March 18, 2015	Colorado Springs Switchbacks FC	0–1	Real Monarchs SLC	Grand Junction, Colorado
7:00 p.m. MDT		Report	Velazco 61'	Stadium: Walker Field; Referee: Alex Krelo; Assistant referees: Kali Smith; Jay Hutchinson

July 15, 2015	BYU	2–3	Real Monarchs SLC	Provo, Utah
7:30 p.m. MDT	Garrett Gee 6'; Christian Bain 40'; Dallin Cutler (yellow card) 60'	Report	Garrett Losee (yellow card) 33'; Johnny Caporelli 51'; Ricardo Velazco (yellow card) 66'; Alec Sundly 80'; Alec Sundly 82'	Stadium: South Stadium; Attendance: N/A; Referee: Marcelo Chaparro

=== USL regular season ===
March 22, 2015 1	LA Galaxy II	0–0	Real Monarchs SLC	Carson, California
5:00 p.m. PDT	Bli (yellow card) 36'; Mendiola (yellow card) 68'	Report	McGovern (yellow card) 29'; Ovalle (yellow card) 52'	Stadium: StubHub Center Track Stadium; Attendance: 1,000; Referee: Bernhard Hosu

March 29, 2015 2	Portland Timbers 2	3–1	Real Monarchs SLC	Portland, Oregon
6:00 p.m. PDT	Belmar 31', 54'; Tshuma (yellow card) 52'; Winchester 57'	Report	Losee (yellow card) 43' (yellow-red card) 86'; Navarro 59'; Baldin (yellow card) 76'	Stadium: Merlo Field; Attendance: 3,667; Referee: Ekaterina Koroleva

April 8, 2015 3	Real Monarchs SLC	1–1	Portland Timbers 2	Sandy, Utah
7:00 p.m. MDT	Saucedo (yellow card) 26'; Glad 27'	Report	Safiu 7', (yellow card) 46'; Winchester (yellow card) 32'; Clarke (yellow card) 68' (yellow-red card) 69'	Stadium: Rio Tinto Stadium; Attendance: 2,551; Referee: Tyler Ploeger

April 11, 2015 4	Real Monarchs SLC	0–1	Colorado Springs Switchbacks FC	Sandy, Utah
4:30 p.m. MDT	Murrell (yellow card) 17'	Report	Harada (yellow card) 28'; Seth 29', (yellow card) 30'; Robinson (yellow card) 82'	Stadium: Rio Tinto Stadium; Attendance: 3,310; Referee: Brad Jensen

April 17, 2015 5	Colorado Springs Switchbacks FC	5–2	Real Monarchs SLC	Colorado Springs, Colorado
7:00 p.m. MDT	González 12'; Vercollone (yellow card) 18', (goal) 25' (pen.), 90' (pen.); Robinson 42'; Harada (yellow card) 45'; Maybin 88'; Armstrong (yellow card) 90'	Report	Tavares 18'; Sundly (yellow card) 61'; Rauhofer 83'	Stadium: Sand Creek Stadium; Attendance: 2,100; Referee: Younes Marrakchi

April 25, 2015 6	Real Monarchs SLC	0–1	LA Galaxy II	Sandy, Utah
8:00 p.m. MDT	Losee (yellow card) 55'	Report	Auras (yellow card) 26'; Diallo 90+3'	Stadium: Rio Tinto Stadium; Attendance: 1,001; Referee: Brad Jensen

April 29, 2015 7	Real Monarchs SLC	1–0	Sacramento Republic FC	Sandy, Utah
7:00 p.m. MDT	Rauhofer (yellow card) 51', (goal) 68'	Report	Braun (yellow card) 57'; Alvarez (yellow card) 65'	Stadium: Rio Tinto Stadium; Attendance: 2,477; Referee: Hamed Sadeghi

May 9, 2015 8	Austin Aztex	3–2	Real Monarchs SLC	Austin, Texas
8:00 p.m. CDT	Tyrpak 15', (yellow card) 70'; Hoffer (yellow card) 39'; Guaraci (yellow card) 85'; Ryden 88'; Caesar (yellow card) 91', (goal) 93'	Report	Rauhofer 40'; Baldin 57'; Fernández (yellow card) 75'; Glad (yellow card) 80'; McGovern (yellow card) 88'	Stadium: House Park; Attendance: 2,739; Referee: Rosendo Mendoza

May 16, 2015 9	Real Monarchs SLC	1–1	Portland Timbers 2	Sandy, Utah
7:00 p.m. MDT	Welshman 9'; Orozco (yellow card) 79'	Report	Thoma (yellow card) 43'; Delbridge (yellow card) 76'; Safiu (yellow card) 79'; Winchester 87'	Stadium: Rio Tinto Stadium; Attendance: 2,615; Referee: Alex Krelo

May 24, 2015 10	Whitecaps FC 2	2–1	Real Monarchs SLC	Greater Vancouver, British Columbia
2:00 p.m. PDT	Clarke 21'; McKendry 33', (yellow card) 34'; Serban (yellow card) 61'; Christianson (yellow card) 63'; Levis (yellow card) 71'	Report	Celestino (yellow card) 5'; Ovalle (yellow card) 42'; Kavita (yellow card) 52' (yellow-red card) 90'; Baldin 81' (pen.)	Stadium: Thunderbird Stadium; Attendance: 1453; Referee: Alain Ruch

May 30, 2015 11	Sacramento Republic FC	1–1	Real Monarchs SLC	Sacramento, California
7:30 p.m. PDT	Estrada 19'; Vuković (yellow card) 66'; Mirković (yellow card) 87'	Report	Rauhofer 6' (pen.), (yellow card) 70'; Orozco (yellow card) 15' (yellow-red card) 89'; Ovalle (yellow card) 76'	Stadium: Bonney Field; Attendance: 11,442; Referee: Victor Rivas

June 3, 2015 12	Real Monarchs SLC	2–2	Whitecaps FC 2	Sandy, Utah
7:00 p.m. MDT	Rauhofer 47'; Tavares (yellow card) 89'; Baldin 90+'	Report	Clarke 33'; Bustos (yellow card) 67'; Lewis 84'	Stadium: Rio Tinto Stadium; Attendance: 3,012; Referee: Leland Grant

June 13, 2015 13	Colorado Springs Switchbacks FC	2–1	Real Monarchs SLC	Colorado Springs, Colorado
7:00 p.m. MDT	González 10'; Burt (yellow card) 19'; Harada 30'	Report	Baldin (yellow card) 21'; Rauhfoer 45' (pen.), (yellow card) 72'	Stadium: Sand Creek Stadium; Attendance: 2,012; Referee: Adam Finney

June 25, 2015 14	Seattle Sounders FC 2	1–0	Real Monarchs SLC	Tukwila, Washington
7:30 p.m. PDT	Sanyang (yellow card) 42'; Rossi 57'	Report	Welshman (yellow card) 38'	Stadium: Starfire Sports Complex; Attendance: 1,789; Referee: Marco Vega

June 27, 2015 15	Arizona United SC	2–1	Real Monarchs SLC	Scottsdale, Arizona
7:30 p.m. MST	Tan (yellow card) 41', (goal) 54'; Granger (yellow card) 68'; Antúnez (yellow card) 82'; Morrison 90+3'	Report	Rauhofer (yellow card) 18'; Schuler (yellow card) 34'; Velazco (yellow card) 37'; Orozco (yellow card) 41'; Copeland 83'	Stadium: Scottsdale Stadium; Attendance: 3,068; Referee: Chipalo Street

July 1, 2015 16	Real Monarchs SLC	1–1	Sacramento Republic FC	Sandy, Utah
7:00 p.m. MDT	Tavares 30'; Rauhofer (yellow card) 74'; Arnone (yellow card) 77'	Report	Braun 27'; Mirković (yellow card) 76'	Stadium: Rio Tinto Stadium; Referee: Brad Jensen

July 11, 2015 17	Real Monarchs SLC	3–1	Austin Aztex	Sandy, Utah
7:00 p.m. MDT	Orrellana 38'; Velazco (yellow card) 40'; Velazco 40'; Welshman (yellow card) 64'; Welshman 70'; Losee (yellow card) 88'	Report	Caesar 40'; Cuero (yellow card) 78'	Stadium: Rio Tinto Stadium; Attendance: 11,003; Referee: Hamed Sadeghi

July 25, 2015 18	Orange County Blues FC	1–0	Real Monarchs SLC	Irvine, California
7:00 p.m. PDT	Blanco (yellow card) 14'; Slager 43'; Felix (yellow card) 48'; Santana (yellow card) 71'	Summary	Lucas Baldin (yellow card) 7'; Orozco (yellow card) 75'	Stadium: Anteater Stadium; Attendance: 724; Referee: (United States) Daniel Radford

August 1, 2015 19	Real Monarchs SLC	1–2	Orange County Blues FC	Sandy, Utah
7:30 p.m. MDT	Pecka (yellow card) 19'; Rauhofer 58' (pen.) (red card) 90'; Phanuel Kavita (yellow card) 71'; Murrell (yellow card) 78'; Lennon (yellow card) 90'	Summary	Blanco (yellow card) 54'; Popara 63' 72'; Ramírez (yellow card) 75'; Slager (yellow card) 89'; Griffiths (yellow card) 90' (yellow-red card); Miranda (red card) 90'	Stadium: Rio Tinto Stadium; Attendance: 5,791; Referee: (United States) Andrew Musashe

August 8, 2015 20	Real Monarchs SLC	1–1	Tulsa Roughnecks FC	Sandy, Utah
7:30 p.m. MDT	Welshman 13'; Arnone (yellow card) 54'	Report	Ochoa 27', (yellow card) 67'; Iarfhlait (yellow card) 91'	Stadium: Rio Tinto Stadium

August 13, 2015 21	Tulsa Roughnecks FC	5–1	Real Monarchs SLC	Tulsa, Oklahoma
7:30 p.m. CDT	Manhebo 23', (yellow card) 65'; Cordeiro 32'; Mata 57', 76'; Davoren (yellow card) 62', (red card); Ochoa 74'; Bell (yellow card) 79'	Report	Orellana 30'	Stadium: ONEOK Field; Attendance: 3,447; Referee: Jon Freemon

August 15, 2015 22	Oklahoma City Energy FC	1–0	Real Monarchs SLC	Oklahoma City, Oklahoma
7:00 p.m. CDT	Greig 74'	Report		Stadium: Taft Stadium; Attendance: 3,872; Referee: Estaban Rosano

August 22, 2015 23	Sacramento Republic FC	1–1	Real Monarchs SLC	Sacramento, California
8:00 p.m. PDT	Braun (yellow card) 56', (goal) 67'; Mirkovic (yellow card) 60'; Klimenta (yellow card) 90'	Report	Kavita (yellow card) 14'; Orozco (yellow card) 60'; Welshman (yellow card) 84'; Baldin 86'	Stadium: Bonney Field; Attendance: 11,442; Referee: Matthew Buckman

August 26, 2015 24	Real Monarchs SLC	2–1	Colorado Springs Switchbacks FC	Sandy, Utah
7:00 p.m. MDT	Welshman 44', 63'; Tavares (yellow card) 90'	Report	Hoffman 45'; Argueta (yellow card) 89'; Greer (yellow card) 90'	Stadium: Rio Tinto Stadium; Attendance: 2,192; Referee: Hamed Sadeghi

August 28, 2015 25	Real Monarchs SLC	2–1	Seattle Sounders FC 2	Sandy, Utah
7:00 p.m. MDT	Velazco 22'; Tavares 45'	Report	Fairclough (yellow card) 42'; Rossi 72'	Stadium: Rio Tinto Stadium; Attendance: 13,979; Referee: Adam Zarrin

September 2, 2015 26	Real Monarchs SLC	2–0	Oklahoma City Energy FC	Sandy, Utah
7:00 p.m. MDT	Welshman 36'; Baldin 69'	Report	Evans (yellow card) 42'; Thomas (yellow card) 56'; Greig (yellow card) 63'; Gonzalez (yellow card) 82'	Stadium: Rio Tinto Stadium; Attendance: 2,230; Referee: Ramy Touchan

September 5, 2015 27	Arizona United SC	2–3	Real Monarchs SLC	Scottsdale, Arizona
7:30 p.m. MST	Rosales (yellow card) 39'; Ruthven 45'; Top (yellow card) 65'; Tan 75'	Report	Kavita 18'; Rauhofer 29'; Sundly 60'; Fernandez (yellow card) 90'; Arnone (yellow card) 90'	Stadium: Scottsdale Stadium; Attendance: 3,314; Referee: Juan Colazo

September 12, 2015 28	Real Monarchs SLC	1–0	Arizona United SC	Sandy, Utah
4:00 p.m. MDT	Rauhofer 11'	Report		Stadium: Rio Tinto Stadium; Attendance: 7,705

=== Results summary ===
Overall								Home						Away					
Pld	Pts	W	L	T	GF	GA	GD	W	L	T	GF	GA	GD	W	L	T	GF	GA	GD
10	6	1	6	3	9	17	−8	1	2	2	3	4	−1	0	4	1	6	13	−7

Last updated: May 26, 2015
Source: 2015 Real Monarchs Schedule
Pld = Matches played; Pts = Points; W = Matches won; T = Matches tied; L = Matches lost; GF = Goals for; GA = Goals against; GD = Goal difference

Round	1	2	3	4	5	6	7	8	9	10	11	12	13	14	15	16	17	18	19	20	21	22	23	24	25	26	27	28
Stadium	A	A	H	H	A	H	H	A	H	A	A	H	A	A	A	H	H	A	H	H	A	A	A	H	H	H	A	H
Result	D	L	D	L	L	L	W	L	D	L	D	D	L	L	L	D	W	L	L	D	L	L	D	W	W	W	W	

Updated to match(es) played on May 26, 2015. Source: 2015 Real Monarchs Schedule
A = Away; H = Home; W = Win; D = Draw; L = Loss

==== Standings ====
Pos	Team	Pld	W	D	L	GF	GA	GD	Pts
8	Portland Timbers 2	28	11	2	15	38	45	−7	35
9	Austin Aztex	28	10	3	15	32	41	−9	33
10	Arizona United	28	10	2	16	31	55	−24	32
11	Vancouver Whitecaps 2	28	8	6	14	39	53	−14	30
12	Real Monarchs	28	7	8	13	32	42	−10	29

Source: 2015 USL schedule
Rules for classification: 1) head-to-head; 2) total wins; 3) total goal differential; 4) total goals scored; 5) disciplinary points; 6) away goals scored; 7) away goal differential; 8) home goals scored; 9) home goal differential; 10) coin toss or drawing of lots

=== U.S. Open Cup ===
May 20, 2015 Round 2	Long Island Rough Riders (New York (state))	0–1	(Utah) Real Monarchs SLC	South Huntington, New York
7:30 p.m. EDT	Holland (yellow card) 29'; Wharf (yellow card) 36'; Whitcomb (yellow card) 46'; Reid (yellow card) 60'	Report	Rauhofer (yellow card) 36'; Velazco 77'	Stadium: St. Anthony's High School; Referee: Mark Allatin

May 27, 2015 Round 3	Real Monarchs SLC (Utah)	0–1	Colorado Springs Switchbacks	Sandy, Utah
	Ovalle (yellow card) 70'	SLC Report; USSF Report	King 5'; Harada (yellow card) 51'; Seth (yellow card) 76'; Bejarano (yellow card) 86'; Badr (yellow card) 90+1'	Stadium: Rio Tinto Stadium; Attendance: 90; Referee: Brad Jensen
