= 2015 Whitecaps FC 2 season =

Whitecaps FC 2
2015 season
- Manager: Alan Koch
- Stadium: Thunderbird Stadium (Capacity: 3,500)
- USL: Conference: 11th Overall: 20th
- Playoffs: Did not qualify
- Top goalscorer: League: Marco Bustos; Caleb Clarke (7 goals each); All: Marco Bustos; Caleb Clarke (7 goals each)
- Highest home attendance: 3,208 (April 19 vs. Toronto)
- Lowest home attendance: 1,106 (July 24 vs. Tulsa)
- Average home league attendance: 1,682
Home colours	Away colours

The 2015 Vancouver Whitecaps FC 2 season was the team's first season of existence, and their first season in the United Soccer League, the third-tier of the American soccer pyramid.

== Competitions ==
=== USL ===
==== Western Conference ====
Pos	Team	Pld	W	D	L	GF	GA	GD	Pts
8	Portland Timbers 2	28	11	2	15	38	45	−7	35
9	Austin Aztex	28	10	3	15	32	41	−9	33
10	Arizona United	28	10	2	16	31	55	−24	32
11	Vancouver Whitecaps 2	28	8	6	14	39	53	−14	30
12	Real Monarchs	28	7	8	13	32	42	−10	29

Source: 2015 USL schedule
Rules for classification: 1) head-to-head; 2) total wins; 3) total goal differential; 4) total goals scored; 5) disciplinary points; 6) away goals scored; 7) away goal differential; 8) home goals scored; 9) home goal differential; 10) coin toss or drawing of lots

Date	Opponent	Score
Mar 29, 2015	at Seattle Sounders FC 2	0-4
Apr 01, 2015	at Austin Aztex	3-0
Apr 12, 2015	at Orange County Blues FC	0-2
Apr 15, 2015	at Sacramento Republic FC	0-2
Apr 19, 2015	vs Toronto FC II	1-1
Apr 26, 2015	vs Seattle Sounders FC 2	1-1
May 3, 2015	at LA Galaxy II	1-2
May 17, 2015	vs Oklahoma City Energy FC	2-2
May 24, 2015	vs Real Monarchs	2-1
May 31, 2015	vs Portland Timbers 2	2-0
Jun 03, 2015	at Real Monarchs	2-2
Jun 06, 2015	at Colorado Springs Switchbacks FC	0-3
Jun 09, 2015	at Oklahoma City Energy FC	0-2
Jun 14, 2015	vs LA Galaxy II	0-2
Jun 21, 2015	vs Portland Timbers 2	3-2
Jun 27, 2015	at Orange County Blues FC	2-3
Jul 04, 2015	vs Seattle Sounders FC 2	3-1
Jul 10, 2015	vs Portland Timbers 2	2-1
Jul 15, 2015	vs Colorado Springs Switchbacks FC	2-2
Jul 19, 2015	at Portland Timbers 2	2-4
Jul 24, 2015	vs Tulsa Roughnecks FC	0-4
Jul 31, 2015	at Tulsa Roughnecks FC	3-1
Aug 08, 2015	at Seattle Sounders FC 2	3-0
Aug 16, 2015	at Portland Timbers 2	1-3
Aug 22, 2015	at Portland Timbers 2	0-2
Sep 06, 2015	vs Sacramento Republic FC	1-2
Sep 13, 2015	vs Orange County Blues FC	1-1
Sep 20, 2015	vs Austin Aztex	2-3

==== Results summary ====
Overall								Home						Away					
Pld	W	D	L	GF	GA	GD	Pts	W	D	L	GF	GA	GD	W	D	L	GF	GA	GD
28	8	6	14	39	53	−14	30	5	5	4	22	23	−1	3	1	10	17	30	−13

Last updated: September 24, 2015.
Source: USL

==== Results by round ====
Round	1	2	3	4	5	6	7	8	9	10	11	12	13	14	15	16	17	18	19	20	21	22	23	24	25	26	27	28
Ground	A	A	A	A	H	H	A	H	H	H	A	A	A	H	H	A	H	H	H	A	H	A	A	H	A	H	H	H
Result	L	W	L	L	D	D	L	D	W	W	D	L	L	L	W	L	W	W	D	L	L	W	W	L	L	L	D	L

Updated to match(es) played on October 6, 2015. Source: USL
A = Away; H = Home; W = Win; D = Draw; L = Loss

== Roster ==
Note: Flags indicate national team as defined under FIFA eligibility rules. Players may hold more than one non-FIFA nationality. Squad correct as of August 29, 2015.

No.	Pos.	Player	Nation
37	MF	Mitch Piraux	Canada
39	GK	Spencer Richey	United States
41	DF	Jackson Farmer	Canada
42	MF	Jordan Haynes	Canada
45	MF	Tyler Rosenlund	Canada
46	MF	Brett Levis	Canada
47	FW	Jovan Blagojevic	Canada
48	MF	Victor Blasco	Spain
49	FW	Mackenzie Pridham	Canada
50	MF	Sahil Sandhu	Canada
51	FW	Billy Schuler	United States
53	GK	Mark Village	Canada
54	DF	Craig Nitti	United States
55	DF	Chris Serban	Canada
56	MF	Ian Christianson	United States
58	MF	Will Seymore	United States
61	MF	Terran Campbell	Canada
62	DF	Deklan Wynne	New Zealand
63	DF	Kadin Chung	Canada
64	MF	Thomas Gardner	Canada
