= Rauhofer =

Rauhofer is a surname. Notable people with the surname include:

- Max Rauhofer (born 1990), Uruguayan footballer
- Peter Rauhofer (1965–2013), Austrian-American disc jockey
