= 2015 MLS SuperDraft =

College draft for soccer teams

General information
- Sport: Soccer
- Date: January 15, 2015
- Time: 12:30 p.m. ET
- Location: Philadelphia, Pennsylvania
- Network: MLSSoccer.com

Overview
- 84 total selections
- First selection: Cyle Larin

The 2015 MLS SuperDraft was the sixteenth SuperDraft conducted by Major League Soccer. The SuperDraft is held each year in conjunction with the annual National Soccer Coaches Association of America convention. The 2015 convention was held January 14–18, 2015 in Philadelphia, Pennsylvania.

The first two rounds of the SuperDraft took place on January 15, 2015. Rounds three and four took place via conference call on January 20, 2015.

== Format ==
The SuperDraft format has remained constant throughout its history and closely resembles that of the NFL draft:

1. Any expansion teams receive the first picks. In 2015, MLS added two expansion teams: New York City FC and Orlando City SC. As determined by a "Priority Draft" conducted on September 24, 2014, Orlando City had the first overall selection and New York City picked second.
2. Non-playoff clubs receive the next picks in reverse order of prior season finish.
3. Teams that make the MLS Cup Playoffs are then ordered by which round of the playoffs they were eliminated.
4. The winners of the MLS Cup are given the last selection, and the losers the penultimate selection.

== Contraction of Chivas USA ==
MLS contracted the Chivas USA franchise at the conclusion of the 2014 MLS season. On November 7, 2014, MLS announced that all draft picks held by teams in the 2015 SuperDraft after previous trades with Chivas USA would be honored, while the two picks still held by Chivas USA would be deleted. Had Chivas USA not been contracted these selections would have been:

- Round 3, pick #48 - Chivas USA's natural selection.
- Round 4, pick #69 - Chivas USA's natural selection.

Also, draft picks retained by Chivas USA for the 2016 MLS SuperDraft were deleted except for the team's second-round pick which was previously traded to Columbus. That 2016 pick will be selection #11 in round two of the 2016 SuperDraft.

== Player selection ==
*	Denotes player who has been selected for an MLS Best XI team

=== Round 1 ===
Any player marked with a * is part of the Generation Adidas program.

Pick #	MLS team	Player	Position	College	Other
1	Orlando City SC	(Canada) Cyle Larin*	Forward	Connecticut	
2	New York City FC	(United States) Khiry Shelton	Forward	Oregon State	Lane United FC
3	Montreal Impact	(Jamaica) Romario Williams*	Forward	UCF	Orlando City U-23
4	San Jose Earthquakes	(United States) Fatai Alashe	Midfielder	Michigan State	Portland Timbers U23s
5	Portland Timbers (Note: #5: Colorado Rapids → Portland Timbers. February 28, 2013: Portland Timbers acquired a first-round selection in the 2015 SuperDraft from Colorado Rapids in exchange for forward Danny Mwanga.)	(United States) Nick Besler	Midfielder	Notre Dame	
6	Toronto FC (Note: #6: Chivas USA → Toronto FC. July 1, 2013: Toronto FC acquired a first-round selection in the 2015 SuperDraft, use of an international roster slot through December 31, 2014, and the #16 spot in the 2013 MLS Allocation Order from Chivas USA in exchange for the #1 spot in the 2013 MLS Allocation Order. Chivas USA used the Allocation pick to select defender Carlos Bocanegra.)	(United States) Alex Bono*	Goalkeeper	Syracuse	Reading United
7	Chicago Fire	(United States) Matt Polster	Defender	SIU Edwardsville	Chicago Fire Premier
8	Houston Dynamo	(United States) Zach Steinberger	Midfielder	Butler	Michigan Bucks
9	Toronto FC	(France) Clément Simonin	Defender	North Carolina State	Seattle Sounders FC U-23
10	Sporting Kansas City (Note: #10: Philadelphia Union → Sporting Kansas City. December 8, 2014: Sporting Kansas City acquired a first-round selection in the 2015 SuperDraft from Philadelphia Union in exchange for forward C.J. Sapong. The traded draft pick is to be Philadelphia's highest first-round selection.)	(United States) Connor Hallisey	Midfielder	California	
11	Toronto FC (Note: #11: Portland Timbers → Toronto FC. September 9, 2013: Toronto FC acquired a first-round selection in the 2015 SuperDraft, forward Bright Dike, and allocation money from Portland Timbers in exchange for forward Maximiliano Urruti and use of an international roster slot through December 31, 2013. The traded pick is Portland's lowest first-round selection.)	(Canada) Skylar Thomas	Defender	Syracuse	Reading United
12	Sporting Kansas City	(United States) Saad Abdul-Salaam	Defender	Akron	Portland Timbers U23s
13	Vancouver Whitecaps FC	(United States) Tim Parker	Defender	St. John's	Long Island Roughriders
14	Colorado Rapids (Note: #14: Columbus Crew → Colorado Rapids. January 15, 2015: Colorado Rapids acquired this first-round selection in the 2015 SuperDraft and allocation money from Columbus Crew SC in exchange for the #19 pick in the 2015 SuperDraft and defender Chris Klute.)	(Sweden) Axel Sjöberg	Defender	Marquette	Thunder Bay Chill
15	FC Dallas	(England) Otis Earle	Defender	UC Riverside	FC Tucson
16	Seattle Sounders FC (Note: #16: Real Salt Lake → Seattle Sounders FC. January 15, 2015: Seattle Sounders FC acquired this first-round selection in the 2015 SuperDraft from Real Salt Lake in exchange for a second-round selection (#27) in the 2015 SuperDraft and allocation money.)	(United States) Cristian Roldan*	Midfielder	Washington	Washington Crossfire
17	D.C. United	(Mexico) Miguel Aguilar	Forward	San Francisco	Portland Timbers U23s
18	New York Red Bulls	(Germany) Leo Stolz	Midfielder	UCLA	
19	Columbus Crew SC (Note: #19: Seattle Sounders FC → Toronto FC → FC Dallas → Colorado Rapids → Columbus Crew. January 15, 2015: Columbus Crew SC acquired this first-round selection in the 2015 SuperDraft and defender Chris Klute from Colorado Rapids in exchange for the #14 pick in the 2015 SuperDraft and allocation money. On January 10, 2014, Colorado had acquired this pick and allocation money from FC Dallas in exchange for head coach Óscar Pareja. As part of the deal, FC Dallas also had to buy out the remainder of Pareja's contract with Colorado. Per the trade stipulations, the traded pick is the lower of FC Dallas's two first-round selections. On December 9, 2013, FC Dallas had acquired this pick, originally a conditional second-round selection in the 2015 SuperDraft, and allocation money from Toronto FC in exchange for midfielder Jackson. The pick was upgraded to a first-round pick when Toronto resigned Jackson to a new contract following the 2014 season. On December 10, 2013, Toronto FC had acquired this first-round selection in the 2015 SuperDraft from Seattle Sounders FC in exchange for goalkeeper Stefan Frei.)	(Jamaica) Sergio Campbell	Defender	Connecticut	
20	Sporting Kansas City (Note: #20: New England Revolution → Sporting Kansas City. February 19, 2014: Sporting Kansas City acquired a first-round selection in the 2015 SuperDraft and allocation money from New England Revolution in exchange for forward Teal Bunbury.)	(United States) Amadou Dia	Defender	Clemson	Real Colorado Foxes
21	Los Angeles Galaxy	(Spain) Ignacio Maganto	Forward	Iona	Reading United

=== Round 2 ===
Any player marked with a * is part of the Generation Adidas program.

Pick #	MLS team	Player	Position	College	Other
22	Orlando City SC	(United States) Conor Donovan*	Defender	North Carolina State	
23	New York City FC	(United States) Connor Brandt	Midfielder	San Diego	FC Tucson
24	Portland Timbers (Note: #24: Montreal Impact → Portland Timbers. June 2, 2014: Portland Timbers acquired a second-round selection in the 2015 SuperDraft from Montreal Impact in exchange for defender Mamadou Danso.)	(United States) Andy Thoma	Defender	Washington	Washington Crossfire
25	Orlando City SC (Note: #25: San Jose Earthquakes → Orlando City. December 11, 2014: Orlando City SC acquired a second-round selection in the 2015 SuperDraft from San Jose Earthquakes in exchange for forward Mark Sherrod.)	(Jamaica) Akeil Barrett	Forward	Tulsa	Tulsa Athletics
26	Colorado Rapids	(United States) Joseph Greenspan	Defender	Navy	
27	Real Salt Lake (Note: #27: Chivas USA → Seattle Sounders FC → Real Salt Lake. January 15, 2015: Real Salt Lake acquired this second-round selection in the 2015 SuperDraft and allocation money from Seattle Sounders FC in exchange for a first-round selection (#16) in the 2015 SuperDraft. On February 19, 2013, Seattle had acquired this pick, a second-round selection in the 2014 MLS SuperDraft, midfielder Shalrie Joseph, and the #3 spot in the 2013 MLS Allocation Order from Chivas USA in exchange for the #15 spot in the 2013 MLS Allocation Order.)	(United States) Boyd Okwuonu	Defender	North Carolina	Orlando City U-23
28	Chicago Fire	(United States) Kingsley Bryce	Midfielder	Saint Louis	
29	Toronto FC (Note: #29: Houston Dynamo → Toronto FC. Trade details needed. No explanation of this trade was noted in the draft order posted on the MLS website on December 17, 2014. It is possible that this is to complete the unresolved 2014 draft pick trade from Houston to Toronto for December 28, 2011 Nathan Sturgis trade.)	(United States) Wesley Charpie	Defender	South Florida	Reading United
30	Houston Dynamo (Note: #30: Toronto FC → Sporting Kansas City → Houston Dynamo. January 15, 2015: Houston Dynamo acquired a second-round selection in the 2015 SuperDraft from Sporting Kansas City in exchange for the MLS rights to midfielder Servando Carrasco. On July 2, 2013, Sporting Kansas City had acquired this pick from Toronto FC in exchange for midfielder Michael Thomas.)	(Mali) Oumar Ballo	Defender	UMBC	Reading United
31	Philadelphia Union	(Bosnia and Herzegovina) Dzenan Catic	Forward	Davenport	Michigan Bucks
32	Portland Timbers	(United States) Christian Volesky	Forward	SIU Edwardsville	FC Tucson
33	Seattle Sounders FC (Note: #33: Sporting Kansas City → New England Revolution → Seattle Sounders FC. January 15, 2015: Seattle Sounders FC acquired a second-round selection in the 2015 SuperDraft from New England Revolution in exchange for forward Sean Okoli. On December 11, 2012, New England had acquired this pick, a first-round selection in the 2014 MLS SuperDraft, and allocation money from Sporting Kansas City in exchange for midfielder Benny Feilhaber.)	(United States) Tyler Miller	Goalkeeper	Northwestern	
34	Portland Timbers (Note: #34: Vancouver Whitecaps FC → Portland Timbers. February 21, 2013: Portland Timbers acquired a second-round selection in the 2015 SuperDraft and a second-round selection in the 2014 MLS SuperDraft from Vancouver Whitecaps FC in exchange for the MLS rights to midfielder Nigel Reo-Coker.)	(Grenada) Kharlton Belmar	Forward	VCU	Portland Timbers U23s
35	Columbus Crew SC	(Israel) Sagi Lev-Ari	Forward	Cal State Northridge	
36	Houston Dynamo (Note: #36: FC Dallas → Houston Dynamo. February 19, 2013: Houston Dynamo acquired a second-round selection in the 2015 SuperDraft from FC Dallas in exchange for midfielder Je-Vaughn Watson.)	(United States) Rob Lovejoy	Forward	North Carolina	Carolina Dynamo
37	Toronto FC (Note: #37: Real Salt Lake → Toronto FC. January 30, 2013: Toronto FC acquired a second-round selection in the 2015 SuperDraft from Real Salt Lake in exchange for forward Joao Plata.)	(Guatemala) Edwin Rivas	Forward	Cal State Northridge	
38	Vancouver Whitecaps FC (Note: #38: D.C. United → Vancouver Whitecaps FC. June 6, 2013: Vancouver Whitecaps FC acquired a second-round selection in the 2015 SuperDraft and a conditional selection in the 2016 MLS SuperDraft from D.C. United in exchange for defender Alain Rochat.)	(United States) Kay Banjo	Forward	UMBC	
39	New York Red Bulls	(United States) Stefano Bonomo	Forward	California	
40	Seattle Sounders FC	(Jamaica) Oniel Fisher	Midfielder	New Mexico	New York Red Bulls U-23
41	Philadelphia Union (Note: #41: New England Revolution → Colorado Rapids → Philadelphia Union. January 6, 2015: Philadelphia Union acquired a second-round selection in the 2015 SuperDraft from Colorado Rapids in exchange for a 2015 season loan of goalkeeper Zac MacMath. The traded pick is Colorado's lowest second-round selection. Should the loan of MacMath become a permanent transfer at the conclusion of the 2015 season, Philadelphia will receive Colorado's highest first-round selection in the 2016 MLS SuperDraft. On December 8, 2014, Colorado had acquired a second-round selection in the 2015 SuperDraft, forward Dimitry Imbongo, and forward Geoffrey Castillion from New England Revolution in exchange for a third-round selection in the 2015 SuperDraft and goalkeeper Joe Nasco.)	(United States) Eric Bird	Midfielder	Virginia	
42	D.C. United (Note: #42: Los Angeles Galaxy → D.C. United. July 29, 2014: D.C. United acquired a second-round selection in the 2015 SuperDraft, defender Kofi Opare, and the #11 spot in the 2014 MLS Allocation Order from Los Angeles Galaxy in exchange for the #3 spot in the 2014 MLS Allocation Order.)	(United States) Dan Metzger	Midfielder	Maryland	Austin Aztex

=== Round 3 ===
Pick #	MLS team	Player	Position	College	Other
43	Orlando City SC	(United States) Earl Edwards Jr.	Goalkeeper	UCLA	Seattle Sounders FC U-23
44	New York City FC	(United States) Andre Rawls	Goalkeeper	St. Mary's	
45	Montreal Impact	(United States) Cameron Porter	Forward	Princeton	
46	San Jose Earthquakes	(Barbados) Keasel Broome	Goalkeeper	Providence	Boston Rams
47	New England Revolution (Note: #47: Colorado Rapids → New England Revolution. December 8, 2014: New England Revolution acquired a third-round selection in the 2015 SuperDraft and goalkeeper Joe Nasco from Colorado Rapids in exchange for a second-round selection in the 2015 SuperDraft, forward Dimitry Imbongo, and forward Geoffrey Castillion.)	(Turks and Caicos Islands) Marc Fenelus	Forward	Cal State Fullerton	
48	Seattle Sounders FC (Note: #48: Chicago Fire → Seattle Sounders FC. January 15, 2014: Seattle Sounders FC acquired a third-round selection in the 2015 SuperDraft, the #8 selection in the first round of the 2014 MLS SuperDraft, and defender Jalil Anibaba from Chicago Fire in exchange for the #13 selection in the first round of the 2014 SuperDraft, defender Jhon Kennedy Hurtado, and defender Patrick Ianni.)	(United States) Andy Craven	Forward	North Carolina	Chicago Fire Premier
49	Houston Dynamo	(United States) Taylor Hunter	Defender	Denver	
50	Toronto FC	(Puerto Rico) Mike Ramos	Forward	Whitworth	
51	Philadelphia Union	(United States) Aaron Simmons	Defender	UCLA	OC Pateadores Blues
52	Portland Timbers	(United States) Anthony Manning	Defender	Saint Louis	
53	Sporting Kansas City	(United States) James Rogers	Midfielder	New Mexico	Ogden Outlaws
54	Vancouver Whitecaps FC	(Serbia) Jovan Blagojevic	Forward	Simon Fraser	
55	Columbus Crew SC	(Bosnia and Herzegovina) Robert Kristo	Forward	Saint Louis	
56	FC Dallas	(United States) Will Seymore	Defender	Oregon State	Portland Timbers U23s
57	Real Salt Lake	(Canada) Jordan Murrell	Defender	Syracuse	K-W United FC
58	Vancouver Whitecaps FC (Note: #58: D.C. United → Vancouver Whitecaps FC. June 28, 2012: Vancouver Whitecaps FC acquired a third-round selection in the 2015 SuperDraft from D.C. United in exchange for forward Long Tan.)	(United States) Adam Montague	Midfielder	Michigan State	Michigan Bucks
59	New York Red Bulls	(United States) Shawn McLaws	Midfielder	Coastal Carolina	Ocean City Nor'easters
60	Columbus Crew SC (Note: #60: Seattle Sounders FC → Columbus Crew. December 12, 2013: Columbus Crew acquired a third-round selection in the 2015 SuperDraft and allocation money from Seattle Sounders FC in exchange for defender Chad Marshall.)	(United States) Tomas Gomez	Goalkeeper	Georgetown	Orlando City U-23
61	Vancouver Whitecaps FC (Note: #61: New England Revolution → Vancouver Whitecaps FC. December 11, 2013: Vancouver Whitecaps FC acquired this third-round selection in the 2015 SuperDraft, originally a conditional pick, from New England Revolution in exchange for goalkeeper Brad Knighton.)	(United States) Spencer Richey	Goalkeeper	Washington	Washington Crossfire
62	Los Angeles Galaxy	(United States) Daniel Keller	Defender	Louisville	Chicago Fire Premier

=== Round 4 ===
Pick #	MLS team	Player	Position	College	Other
63	Orlando City SC	(Puerto Rico) Sidney Rivera	Forward	Old Dominion	
64	New York City FC	(Norway) Markus Naglestad	Forward	Providence	Connecticut FC Azul
65	Montreal Impact	(United States) Cameron Iwasa	Forward	UC Irvine	OC Pateadores Blues
66	San Jose Earthquakes	(United States) Chimdum Mez	Forward	Cal State Sacramento	Los Angeles Misioneros
67	Colorado Rapids	(Senegal) Dominique Badji	Forward	Boston University	Boston Rams
68	Chicago Fire	(United States) Alex Shinsky	Midfielder	Maryland	Baltimore Bohemians
69	Columbus Crew (Note: #71: Houston Dynamo → Columbus Crew. December 3, 2010: Columbus Crew acquired a fourth-round selection in the 2015 SuperDraft from Houston Dynamo in exchange for forward Jason Garey.)	(United States) Kalen Ryden	Defender	Midwestern	Midland/Odessa Sockers
70	Toronto FC	(Mexico) Sal Bernal	Forward	UNLV	Las Vegas Mobsters
71	Philadelphia Union	(United States) Raymond Lee	Midfielder	Saint Louis	
72	Vancouver Whitecaps FC (Note: #74: Portland Timbers → Vancouver Whitecaps FC. February 13, 2013: Vancouver Whitecaps FC acquired a fourth-round selection in the 2015 SuperDraft from Portland Timbers in exchange for midfielder Michael Nanchoff.)	(United States) Craig Nitti	Defender	Loyola Marymount	Portland Timbers U23s
73	Sporting Kansas City	(Belize) Tony Rocha	Defender	Tulsa	Tulsa Athletics
74	Vancouver Whitecaps FC	(Canada) Nikola Paunic	Defender	South Florida	K-W United FC
75	Seattle Sounders FC (Note: #76: Columbus Crew → Seattle Sounders FC. December 16, 2013: Seattle Sounders FC acquired a fourth-round selection in the 2015 SuperDraft from Columbus Crew SC in exchange for the MLS rights to goalkeeper Steve Clark.)	(United States) Charlie Lyon	Goalkeeper	Marquette	
76	FC Dallas	(Canada) Janeil Hoilett	Midfielder		FSV Frankfurt
77	Real Salt Lake	(Brazil) Lucas Baldin	Midfielder	South Florida	Seattle Sounders FC U-23|Reading United
78	Colorado Rapids (Note: #78: D.C. United → Chivas USA → Colorado Rapids. April 10, 2014: Colorado Rapids acquired a fourth-round selection in the 2015 SuperDraft from Chivas USA in exchange for midfielder Martín Rivero. On February 14, 2013, Chivas USA had acquired this selection, originally a second-round selection in the 2015 Supplemental Draft, from D.C. United in exchange for defender James Riley.)	(United States) Matt Jeffrey	Defender	Monmouth	
79	New York Red Bulls	(Puerto Rico) Manolo Sanchez	Midfielder	Clemson	Reading United
80	Seattle Sounders FC	(New Zealand) Andrew Bevin	Forward	West Virginia	
81	Toronto FC (Note: #81: New England Revolution → Toronto FC. December 18, 2014: Toronto FC acquired a fourth-round selection in the 2015 SuperDraft from New England Revolution in exchange for midfielder Jeremy Hall.)	(United States) Tyler Engel	Forward	North Carolina	Chicago Fire Premier
82	Los Angeles Galaxy	(United States) Andrew Wolverton	Goalkeeper	Penn State	IMG Academy Bradenton
83	Colorado Rapids (Note: #83: New York Red Bulls → Colorado Rapids. March 28, 2013: Colorado Rapids acquired a conditional 2015 draft pick from New York Red Bulls in exchange for forward Andre Akpan. MLS awarded Colorado this pick at the end of the 2015 SuperDraft after the Supplemental Draft was eliminated.)	(United States) Brandon Fricke	Defender	Butler	Des Moines Menace
84	Portland Timbers (Note: #84: Montreal Impact → Portland Timbers. February 6, 2012: Portland Timbers acquired a fourth-round selection in the 2015 Supplemental Draft from Montreal Impact in exchange for use of an international roster slot through December 31, 2012. MLS awarded Portland this pick at the end of the 2015 SuperDraft after the Supplemental Draft was eliminated.)	(United States) Seth Casiple	Midfielder	California	Austin Aztex

=== Unresolved 2015 SuperDraft Pick Trades ===
- Conditional, Portland Timbers → Seattle Sounders FC. February 20, 2013: Seattle Sounders FC acquired a conditional 2015 draft pick and a first-round selection in the 2014 Supplemental Draft from Portland Timbers in exchange for the MLS rights to defender Mikaël Silvestre.
- Conditional, Real Salt Lake → D.C. United. July 17, 2013: D.C. United acquired a conditional 2015 draft pick and a third-round selection in the 2014 MLS SuperDraft from Real Salt Lake in exchange for defender Brandon McDonald.

== Unspecified Year Draft Trade ==
The trade below was announced without specifying which year or which draft (Super or Supplemental) contains the traded pick. The traded pick was not included in the 2013, 2014, or 2015 MLS drafts.

- Conditional, Seattle Sounders FC → Toronto FC. September 14, 2012: Toronto FC acquired a conditional draft pick and the #10 position in the MLS Allocation Order from Seattle Sounders FC in exchange for the #1 position in the MLS Allocation Order. Seattle used the Allocation pick to select goalkeeper Marcus Hahnemann.

== Notable undrafted players ==
=== Homegrown players ===
Original MLS team	Player	Position	College	Conference	Notes
Chicago Fire	Patrick Doody	Defender	Indiana	Big Ten	
New York Red Bulls	Sean Davis	Midfielder	Duke	ACC	
Toronto FC	Jay Chapman	Midfielder	Michigan State	Big Ten	
Vancouver Whitecaps FC	Ben McKendry	Midfielder	New Mexico	Conference USA	

=== Others ===
Original MLS team	Player	Position	College	Conference	Notes
D.C. United	Luke Mishu	Defender	Notre Dame	ACC	Made 11 appearances for D.C. United
D.C. United	Travis Worra	Goalkeeper	New Hampshire	America East	Made 14 appearances for D.C. United
