= 2015 BYU Cougars men's soccer team =

BYU Cougars men's soccer
2015 season
- Owner: Brigham Young University
- Coach: Chris Watkins
- Stadium: South Stadium, 3,000 capacity
- U.S. Open Cup: Lost 1st Round vs. Harpo's FC (0-0 aet) (2-4 p)
- Highest home attendance: 3,000
- Lowest home attendance: 300
- Average home league attendance: 743
Home colors	Away colors

The 2015 BYU Cougars men's soccer team is part of the Brigham Young University athletics program but does not play in a college conference. During the 2015 USL Premier Development League, the Cougars were coached for a 21st consecutive season by Chris Watkins. The Cougars finished the season 1-5-8. After the season Watkins announced he would be retiring as head coach of the men's soccer team.

== Media ==
=== Television and internet streaming ===
All BYU Cougars home games were streamed live on YouTube.

== Regular season ==
=== Real Colorado ===
May 8 Game 1	BYU Cougars	0–2	Real Colorado Foxes	Highlands Ranch, CO
7:00 p.m. MDT	Jerry Dearden (yellow card) 43'; Ariel Chavez (yellow card) 73'; Dallin Cutler (yellow card) 90+'		Daniel Arrubla 23'; Andrew Mejia 33'; Andrew Mejia (yellow card) 75'	Stadium: Highlands Heritage Stadium; Attendance: 116; Referee: Adam Zarroty; Assistant referees: Robert Barycyzk; Chris Greer; Fourth official: Rob Kiefer

=== Albuquerque ===
May 22 Game 2	BYU Cougars	1–2	Albuquerque Sol FC	Albuquerque, NM
2:30 p.m. MDT	Jace Green 37'; Dallin Cutler (yellow card) 42'; Richard Haddock (red card) 87'	Recap	Matt Ball 33'; Matt Ball 65'; Ricardo Zacarias (yellow card) 88'	Stadium: Ben Rios Field; Attendance: 484; Referee: Doug Cotter; Assistant referees: Steve Schafer; Forest Dunnahoo; Fourth official: James Keohone

=== FC Tucson ===
Broadcasters: John Pearlman and Jeff Rogers

May 23 Game 3	BYU Cougars	0–0	FC Tucson	Tucson, AZ
8:30 p.m. MDT	Matt Rider (yellow card) 20'; Andrew Dossett (yellow card) 27'; Jerry Dearden (yellow card) 75'; Jace Green (yellow card) 90+'			Stadium: Kino Sports Complex; Attendance: 762; Referee: Robert Hullner; Assistant referees: Matt Stewart; Ramy Touchan

=== Real Colorado ===
Broadcasters: Dave Neeley and Hugh Van Wagenen

June 5 Game 4	Real Colorado Foxes	2–2	BYU Cougars	Provo, UT
7:30 p.m. MDT	Blake McNalit (yellow card) 8'; Jeffrey Jennings 21'; Danny Arrubla 40'	Recap	Jace Green 11'; Jace Green 29'	Stadium: South Stadium; Attendance: 400; Referee: Hamed S. Assistant referees: Jeff Gaston; Steven Chapman; Fourth official: Paige Kulm

=== Real Colorado ===
Broadcasters: Dave Neeley and Carla Swensen

June 6 Game 5	Real Colorado Foxes	1–1	BYU Cougars	Provo, UT
8 p.m. MDT	Javon Bastic 29'; Jordan Gealy (yellow card) 42'; Miguel Rosolos (yellow card) 71'; Jordan Gealy (red card) 78'; Santiago Velez (yellow card) 90+'	Recap	Ethan Meyer (yellow card) 44'; Pedro Vasconeclos (yellow card) 71'; Dallin Cutler 80'	Stadium: South Stadium; Attendance: 400; Referee: Brad Jensen; Assistant referees: Robert Pickett

=== Las Vegas ===
Broadcasters: Dave Neeley and Carla Swensen

June 9 Game 6	Las Vegas Mobsters	2–2	BYU Cougars	Provo, UT
7:30 p.m. MDT	Craig Carney (yellow card) 35'; Craig Carney 45'; Franck Taylor (yellow card) 80'; Franck Taylor 81'; Lucas Cawley (yellow card) 86'; Carlos Lara (yellow card) 90'	Recap	Dallin Cutler (yellow card) 30'; Matt Rider (yellow card) 51'; Ryan Botcherby 76'; Dallin Cutler 78'	Stadium: South Stadium; Attendance: 400; Referee: Jeff Gastosh; Assistant referees: Brandon Major; Paige Kulm; Fourth official: Marcelo Chaporro

=== Albuquerque ===
Broadcasters: Dave Neeley, Hugh Van Wagenen, and Carla Swensen

June 11 Game 7	Albuquerque Sol	3–2	BYU Cougars	Provo, UT
7:30 p.m. MDT	Sam Gleadle 21'; Giovanni Rollie (yellow card) 39'; Yuri Domiciano (yellow card) 52'; Carlos Sendin 62'; Ricardo Zacharias 68'; Adrian Mora (yellow card) 76'	Recap	Jace Green 44'; Pedro Vasconcelos (yellow card) 70'; Garrett Gee 78'; Ethan Meyer (yellow card) 80'; Andrew Dossett (yellow card) 90'	Stadium: South Stadium; Attendance: 300; Referee: Henson Keetch; Assistant referees: Marcelo Chapparo; Jason Hutchinson; Fourth official: Paul Burgess

=== FC Tucson ===
Broadcasters: Skyler Hardman and Hugh Van Wagenen

June 19 Game 8	FC Tucson	2–2	BYU Cougars	Provo, UT
7:30 p.m. MDT	Jose Miranda (red card) 45'; Luis Martinez 51'; Pedro Espindola (red card) 53'; Devonte Dubose 58'; Edgar Reyna (yellow card) 61'; Luis Martinez (yellow card) 64'; Merlin Hoekendierff (yellow card) 90'	Recap	Winston Sorhaitz 17'; Pedro Vasconeclos 18'; Winston Sorhaitz (yellow card) 34'; Dallin Cutler (yellow card) 50'; Junior Lartey (yellow card) 65'; Ryan Botcherby (yellow card) 81'; Ethan Meyer (yellow card) 83'; Ryan Botcherby (red card) 90+'	Stadium: South Stadium; Attendance: 400; Referee: Jeff Gaston; Assistant referees: Kristi Mak; Kali Hamby-Smith; Fourth official: Blake Griffiths

=== FC Tucson ===
Broadcasters: Mitchell Marshall and Carla Swensen

June 20 Game 9	FC Tucson	3–1	BYU Cougars	Provo, UT
7:30 p.m. MDT	Justin Bileyu 17'; Davis Clemens 33'; Ozzie Ramos (yellow card) 56'; David Clemens 68'		Andrew Dossett (yellow card) 41'; Ethan Meyer (yellow card) 62'; Junior Lartey (yellow card) 65'; Jacob Ence 90+'	Stadium: South Stadium; Attendance: 300; Referee: Blake Griffiths; Assistant referees: Alan Jurenez; Daniel Spicer–Escalante; Fourth official: Robert Duncombe

=== Las Vegas ===
June 26 Game 10	BYU Cougars	1–2	Las Vegas Mobsters	Las Vegas, NV
8:30 p.m. MDT	Taylor Fankhauser 19'		Carlos Lara 45'; Craig Carney 78'; Aaron Goo (yellow card) 84'	Stadium: Valley High School; Attendance: N/A; Referee: Miguel Urbina; Assistant referees: Jason Hutchinson; Scott Connor; Fourth official: Oscar Arias

=== Las Vegas ===
June 27 Game 11	BYU Cougars	0–4	Las Vegas Mobsters	Las Vegas, NV
8:30 p.m. MDT	Jaiden Waggoner (yellow card) 36'		Kandai Otsuka 32'; Aaron Goo (yellow card) 36'; Craig Carney 68'; Milan Popovic 73'; Oscar Velasquez 82'; Craig Carney (yellow card) 83'	Stadium: Valley High School; Attendance: N/A; Referee: Oscar Arias; Assistant referees: Ray Baez; Benjamin Limon; Fourth official: Miguel Urbina

=== Burlingame ===
Broadcasters: Carla Swensen and Hugh Van Wagenen

July 4 Game 12	Burlingame Dragons FC	3-2	BYU Cougars	Provo, UT
7:30 p.m. MDT	Joshua Smith 3'; Luke Salmon (yellow card) 40'; Own Goal 45'; Joseph Cariel (yellow card) 50'; Fredy Razo 52'; Marquis Brooks (yellow card) 64'; Joshua Smith (yellow card) 69'	Recap	Garrett Gee 14'; Emmanuel Lartey 25'; Andrew Dossett (yellow card) 42'; Ethan Meyer (yellow card) 67'; Dallin Cutler (yellow card) 77'	Stadium: South Stadium; Attendance: 3,000; Referee: Alex Krelo; Assistant referees: James Roy; Marcelo Chuparo; Fourth official: Karsen Gillwad

=== Burlingame ===
Broadcasters: Jason Long and Andreas Wolf

July 11 Game 13	BYU Cougars	0–2	Burlingame Dragons FC	Burlingame, CA
6:00 p.m. MDT			Fredy Razo 28'; Brian Nana-Sinkam (yellow card) 50'; Junior Cardona (yellow card) 62'; Josh Morton (yellow card) 64'; Ugochukwu Uche 69'	Stadium: Burlingame High School Stadium; Attendance: N/A

=== Real Monarchs ===
BYU and Real Colorado were scheduled to play each other for the finale on July 15. Real Colorado withdrew from the game claiming travel conflicts, giving BYU their lone win of the year. Real Colorado was also deducted 3 points for league violations. BYU then scheduled a match with the Real Monarchs for their senior night match.

Broadcasters: Dave Neeley and Carla Swensen

July 15 Game 14	Real Monarchs	3-2	BYU Cougars	Provo, UT
7:30 p.m. MDT	Garrett Losee (yellow card) 33'; Johnny Caporelli 51'; Ricardo Velazco (yellow card) 66'; Alec Sundly 80'; Alec Sundly 82'	Recap	Garrett Gee 6'; Christian Bain 40'; Dallin Cutler (yellow card) 60'	Stadium: South Stadium; Attendance: N/A; Referee: Marco Shapiro

== 2015 Lamar Hunt U.S. Open Cup ==
For the first time since 2007, in 2015 BYU was invited to participate in the Lamar Hunt U.S. Open Cup. The field expansion to 91 teams gave the Cougars only their third-ever invitation. The Cougars were given a bye from the qualifying round and a host location for the first round where they would meet new team Harpo's FC, a squad sponsored by Avery Brewing Company of Colorado. If they could win it would give BYU their first-ever win in the U.S. Open Cup.

The Cougars and Harpo's FC would play a penalty-free match and a full 120 minutes of scoreless play, setting up a shootout for the right to advance to the second round.

Broadcasters: Dave Neeley and Hugh Van Wagenen

May 13	Harpo's FC	0–0 (a.e.t.) (4–2 p)	BYU Cougars	Provo, UT
7:30 PM MDT				Stadium: South Stadium; Referee: Adam Finney
	Penalties
	Justin Geibel, Ben Iiames, Corey Cullen, Sawyer Frank		Dallin Cutler, Jacob Ence

== Roster ==
No.	Position	Player	Year
00	GK	Brenden Ottman	Junior
0	GK	Trevor LeSueur	Sophomore
1	GK	Michael "Jake" Petersen	Senior
2	F	Ariel Chavez	Senior
3	F	Jacob Ence	Freshman
4	MF	Josh Hunter	Junior
5	D	Ethan Meyer	Junior
6	MF	Dallin Cutler	Junior
7	F	Garrett Gee	Senior
8	MF	Jake Miles	Sophomore
10	MF	Pedro Vasconeclos	Junior
11	D	Winston Sorhaitz	Junior
12	D	Jerry Dearden	Sophomore
13	D	Emmanuel "Junior" Lartey	Sophomore
14	MD	Matt Rider	Junior
15	D	Ryan Botcherby	Freshman
16	M	Christian Bain	Freshman
17	MD	Ben Jensen	Freshman
18	D	Andrew Dossett	Freshman
19	MF	Jace Green	Senior
20	MF	Zack Cowan	Freshman
21	MF	MJ Affleck	Freshman
23	F	Gavin Christensen	Freshman

== Standings ==
Pos	Team	Pld	W	L	T	GF	GA	GD	Pts
1	FC Tucson (C)	14	8	2	4	28	15	+13	28
2	Albuquerque Sol FC (T)	14	8	3	3	19	12	+7	27
3	Las Vegas Mobsters	14	5	6	3	19	19	0	18
4	Real Colorado Foxes (Note: Real Colorado Foxes deducted three points.)	14	5	4	5	20	21	−1	17
5	BYU Cougars	14	1	8	5	17	28	−11	8

(C) Champions; (T) Qualified, but not yet for the particular phase indicated
