= Chimdum Mez =

American soccer player

Personal information
- Full name: Chimdum Johnny Mez
- Date of birth: November 25, 1992 (age 33)
- Place of birth: Sacramento, California, United States
- Height: 1.95 m (6 ft 5 in)
- Position: Forward

College career
Years	Team	Apps	(Gls)
2010–2014	Sacramento State Hornets	68	(10)

Senior career*
Years	Team	Apps	(Gls)
2013	Los Angeles Misioneros	4	(0)
2016	Sacramento Gold		
2017–2018	Juventud Escazuceña		
2019	Fútbol Consultants Desamparados		
2020	Santos de Guápiles	15	(1)
- * Club domestic league appearances and goals as of July 1, 2020

Chimdum Johnny Mez (born November 25, 1992) is an American soccer player who plays as a forward.

== Career ==
=== College and amateur ===
Mez played four years of college soccer at California State University, Sacramento between 2010 and 2014, including a redshirted year in 2011. During his time with Sac State, Mez made 68 appearances, scoring 10 goals and tallying 4 assists.

While playing at college, Mez appeared for USL PDL side Los Angeles Misioneros in 2013.

=== Professional ===
On January 20, 2015, Mez was selected 66th overall in the 2015 MLS SuperDraft by San Jose Earthquakes. However, he was not signed by the club.

In 2016, Mez played with NPSL side Sacramento Gold.

Following a short trial, Mez moved to AD Escazuceña of the Segunda División de Costa Rica in 2017. In 2019, Mez also played for Fútbol Consultants Desamparados in Costa Rica.

In January 2020, Mez signed for his first fully professional team, joining Liga FPD side Santos de Guápiles.

== Personal life ==
Mez's cousin is fellow professional soccer player Amobi Okugo. Mez is also a rapper under the name Chimchilla.
