= Tan Long =

Chinese footballer

Tan Long 谭龙
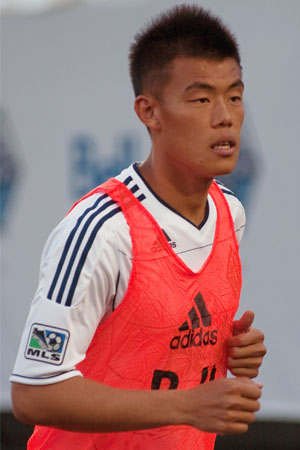
- Tan warming up with Vancouver Whitecaps in 2011

Personal information
- Full name: Tan Long
- Birth name: Tan Xin
- Date of birth: April 1, 1988 (age 38)
- Place of birth: Dalian, Liaoning, China
- Height: 6 ft 1 in (1.85 m)
- Position: Forward

Team information
- Current team: Changchun Yatai
- Number: 29

Youth career
- 2004–2006: Shanghai United

Senior career*
Years	Team	Apps	(Gls)
2007–2008	Pudong Zobon	35	(3)
2009	Atlanta Blackhawks	12	(7)
2010	FC Tampa Bay	25	(3)
2011–2012	Vancouver Whitecaps FC	17	(1)
2011	→ Vancouver Whitecaps FC U-23 (loan)	6	(5)
2012	→ Vancouver Whitecaps FC U-23 (loan)	2	(3)
2012	D.C. United	6	(1)
2012	→ Richmond Kickers (loan)	1	(0)
2013	Orlando City	25	(5)
2014	Harbin Yiteng	7	(0)
2014–2016	Arizona United	69	(29)
2015	→ Tampa Bay Rowdies (loan)	4	(1)
2017–	Changchun Yatai	268	(97)

International career^{‡}
2018–2024	China	20	(3)
2023	China U23 (wildcard)	5	(2)
Medal record
Representing China
Men's football
EAFF Championship
Bronze medal – third place	2019 South Korea	Team
Bronze medal – third place	2022 Japan	Team
- * Club domestic league appearances and goals as of 8 November 2026 ‡ National team caps and goals as of 22 January 2024

Tan Long
- Simplified Chinese: 谭龙
- Traditional Chinese: 譚龍
Transcriptions
Standard Mandarin
- Hanyu Pinyin: Tán Lóng
- IPA: [tʰǎn lʊ̌ŋ]

Tan Xin
- Simplified Chinese: 谭鑫
- Traditional Chinese: 譚鑫
Transcriptions
Standard Mandarin
- Hanyu Pinyin: Tán Xīn
- IPA: [tʰǎn ɕín]

Tan Long (Chinese: 谭龙; pinyin: Tán Lóng; born April 1, 1988), former name Tan Xin (Chinese: 谭鑫; pinyin: Tán Xīn), is a Chinese professional footballer who plays as a forward for China League One club Changchun Yatai and the China national team.

== Club career ==
Tan started playing football when he was six. Between 1994 and 2004, he studied academics and played football at the Zhongshan School in his hometown Dalian before moving to Shanghai to further his career. He subsequently played for Shanghai United's youth team before joining second tier club Pudong Zobon in 2008 in the China League One division. He made his senior debut and scored his first professional goal on April 29, 2007, in a 2–1 home defeat to Beijing Institute of Technology.

Tan relocated to the United States in late 2008, and played for the Atlanta Blackhawks in the USL Premier Development League in 2009, scoring 7 goals in 12 appearances. He attended open tryouts for MLS’s Philadelphia Union, but did not get called back after the first round of workouts, and eventually signed with FC Tampa Bay of the new USSF Division 2 Professional League in January 2010.

Tan's rights were traded to Vancouver Whitecaps FC as part of the deal taking Jonny Steele and Ricardo Sánchez to Tampa Bay on July 20, 2010. He went on trial with the club in November 2010 in view of signing with the club following their move up to Major League Soccer. Tan signed a contract with the club on March 11, 2011. He made his debut for the club on March 26, 2011, in a 1–0 loss to Philadelphia Union, and in doing so became the first Chinese-born player to play for a Major League Soccer club. On October 12, 2011, Tan become the first Chinese-born player to score a goal in the league, against D.C. United.

Whitecaps FC traded Tan to D.C. United on June 28, 2012, in exchange for a third-round 2015 MLS SuperDraft pick. He scored his first goal against the Chicago Fire in a 4–2 win for D.C. United. Tan was later released after the end of the season.

Tan then signed with USL Professional Division club Orlando City on February 6, 2013. On April 6, 2013, Tan scored a goal and assisted on another during his debut for Orlando in a 3–1 victory over Phoenix FC. In the fourth round of the 2013 U.S. Open Cup, he scored in the second minute in a 1–0 victory against defending champions Sporting Kansas City to bring his club to the next round. His contract was not renewed at the end of the 2013 season and he was released.

On February 21, 2014, Tan returned to China and joined Chinese Super League newcomer Harbin Yiteng. He received a ban of four matches at the beginning of 2014 season when he was registered at the Chinese Football Association for age falsification which he changed his age from April 1, 1988, to February 2, 1989. Tan played seven matches for Harbin before he was released by the club on July 5, 2014.

Tan returned to the United States and signed with USL Pro club Arizona United SC on July 11, 2014. In only 12 league appearances for Arizona, Tan scored five goals, tying with Jonathan Top as the team's leading scorer and led the team with 32 shots. After signing Tan, Arizona nearly doubled its goals-per-game average, going from 0.88 to 1.58. Tan was named to the All-League Second Team for his efforts. On October 21, 2014, it was announced that Tan had signed a multi-year contract for the club before the 2015 USL season. He again led United with 14 goals in 27 games and was tied for fourth in league play along with Luke Vercollone of Colorado Springs. He also was selected for the All-League First Team. Tan was loaned to the Tampa Bay Rowdies after the end of the USL season on September 22, 2015. Tan played for Arizona United in 2016.

=== Changchun Yatai ===
On January 22, 2017, Tan transferred to Chinese Super League side Changchun Yatai. He made his debut for Changchun on March 4, 2017, in a 5–1 away defeat against Shanghai SIPG, coming on as a substitute for Zhou Dadi in the half time. His first goal in the Chinese Super League came in a 1–0 home win against Henan Jianye on April 23, 2017, when he scored the winning goal as Yatai secured their first win of the season.

In a memorable game against 7-time defending champions Guangzhou Evergrande at home on August 11, 2018, he came on as a substitute and scored twice to help the team come from behind to win 3-2. At the end of the 2018 season, he would unfortunately be part of the squad that was relegated.

On March 9, 2019, Tan scored his first hat trick for Yatai in a 4-1 away win against Shanghai Shenxin in the opening game of the 2019 China League One season. Tan scored 19 league goals and won both the domestic golden boot and Most Valuable Player in the 2019 China League One season. On October 8, 2020, Tan made his 100th appearance for Yatai in a 2-0 win against Taizhou Yuanda. Yatai went on to win the title and earned promotion back to the top tier at the end of the 2020 season. Tan won the golden boot with 11 goals.

On June 4, 2022, Tan scored his first Chinese Super League hat-trick in a 4-1 win against Guangzhou City in the opening game of the 2022 Chinese Super League season.

== International career ==
Tan made his debut for Chinese national team on March 26, 2018, in a 4–1 loss against Czech Republic in the third place match of 2018 China Cup. On 12 June 2021, Tan scored his first international goal in a 5–0 win over Maldives in the 2022 FIFA World Cup qualification.

Tan was named in China's squad for the 2023 AFC Asian Cup in Qatar and started the team's opening match against Tajikistan on January 13, 2024.

== Career statistics ==
=== Club ===
As of 8 November 2026

Appearances and goals by club, season and competition
Club	Season	League			National cup		Continental		Other		Total	
Club	Season	Division	Apps	Goals	Apps	Goals	Apps	Goals	Apps	Goals	Apps	Goals
Pudong Zobon	2007	China League One	12	1	–		–		–		12	1
Pudong Zobon	2008	China League One	23	2	–		–		–		23	2
Pudong Zobon	Total		35	3	0	0	0	0	0	0	35	3
Atlanta Blackhawks	2009	USL PDL	12	7	–		–		–		12	7
FC Tampa Bay	2010	USSF D2 Pro League	25	3	2	0	–		–		27	3
Vancouver Whitecaps FC	2011	Major League Soccer	13	1	0	0	–		–		13	1
Vancouver Whitecaps FC	2012	Major League Soccer	4	0	1	0	–		0 (Note: Appearances in Playoffs)	0	5	0
Vancouver Whitecaps FC	Total		17	1	1	0	0	0	0	0	18	1
Vancouver Whitecaps FC U-23	2011	PDL	6	5	–		–		–		6	5
Vancouver Whitecaps FC U-23	2012	PDL	2	3	–		–		–		2	3
Vancouver Whitecaps FC U-23	Total		8	8	0	0	0	0	0	0	8	8
D.C. United	2012	Major League Soccer	6	1	0	0	–		0	0	6	1
Richmond Kickers	2012	USL	1	0	0	0	–		0	0	1	0
Orlando City	2013	USL Pro	23	2	3	1	–		2	3	28	6
Harbin Yiteng	2014	Chinese Super League	7	0	0	0	–		–		7	0
Arizona United	2014	USL Pro	12	5	0	0	–		0	0	12	5
Arizona United	2015	USL	27	14	1	0	–		–		28	14
Arizona United	2016	USL	29	10	1	0	–		–		30	10
Arizona United	Total		68	29	2	0	0	0	0	0	70	29
Tampa Bay Rowdies (loan)	2015	NASL	4	1	0	0	–		–		4	1
Changchun Yatai	2017	Chinese Super League	29	8	0	0	–		–		29	8
Changchun Yatai	2018	Chinese Super League	29	6	0	0	–		–		29	6
Changchun Yatai	2019	China League One	30	19	0	0	–		–		30	19
Changchun Yatai	2020	China League One	15	11	2	1	–		–		17	12
Changchun Yatai	2021	Chinese Super League	22	3	2	2	–		–		24	5
Changchun Yatai	2022	Chinese Super League	32	10	0	0	–		–		32	10
Changchun Yatai	2023	Chinese Super League	26	10	0	0	–		–		26	10
Changchun Yatai	2024	Chinese Super League	28	8	2	0	–		–		30	8
Changchun Yatai	2025	Chinese Super League	28	9	1	1	–		–		29	10
Changchun Yatai	2026	China League One	29	13	1	0	–		–		30	13
Changchun Yatai	Total		268	97	8	4	0	0	0	0	276	101
Career total			474	152	16	5	0	0	2	3	492	160

=== International ===
Appearances and goals by national team and year
National team	Year	Apps	Goals
China	2018	1	0
China	2019	5	0
China	2020	0	0
China	2021	1	1
China	2022	3	1
China	2023	6	0
China	2024	4	1
Total		20	3

Scores and results list China's goal tally first, score column indicates score after each Tan goal.

List of international goals scored by Tan Long
No.	Date	Venue	Opponent	Score	Result	Competition
1	11 June 2021	Sharjah Stadium, Sharjah, United Arab Emirates	Maldives	5–0	5–0	2022 FIFA World Cup qualification
2	27 July 2022	Toyota Stadium, Toyota, Japan	Hong Kong	1–0	1–0	2022 EAFF E-1 Football Championship
3	1 January 2024	United Arab Emirates	Hong Kong	1–0	1–2	Friendly

== Honours ==
Orlando City

- USL Pro Championship: 2013

Changchun Yatai

- China League One: 2020

Individual

- USL All-League First Team: 2015
- USL All-League Second Team: 2014
- China League One Most Valuable Player: 2019
- China League One Domestic Player of the Year: 2026
- China League One Domestic Golden Boot: 2026
