= Spencer Richey =

American soccer player (born 1992)

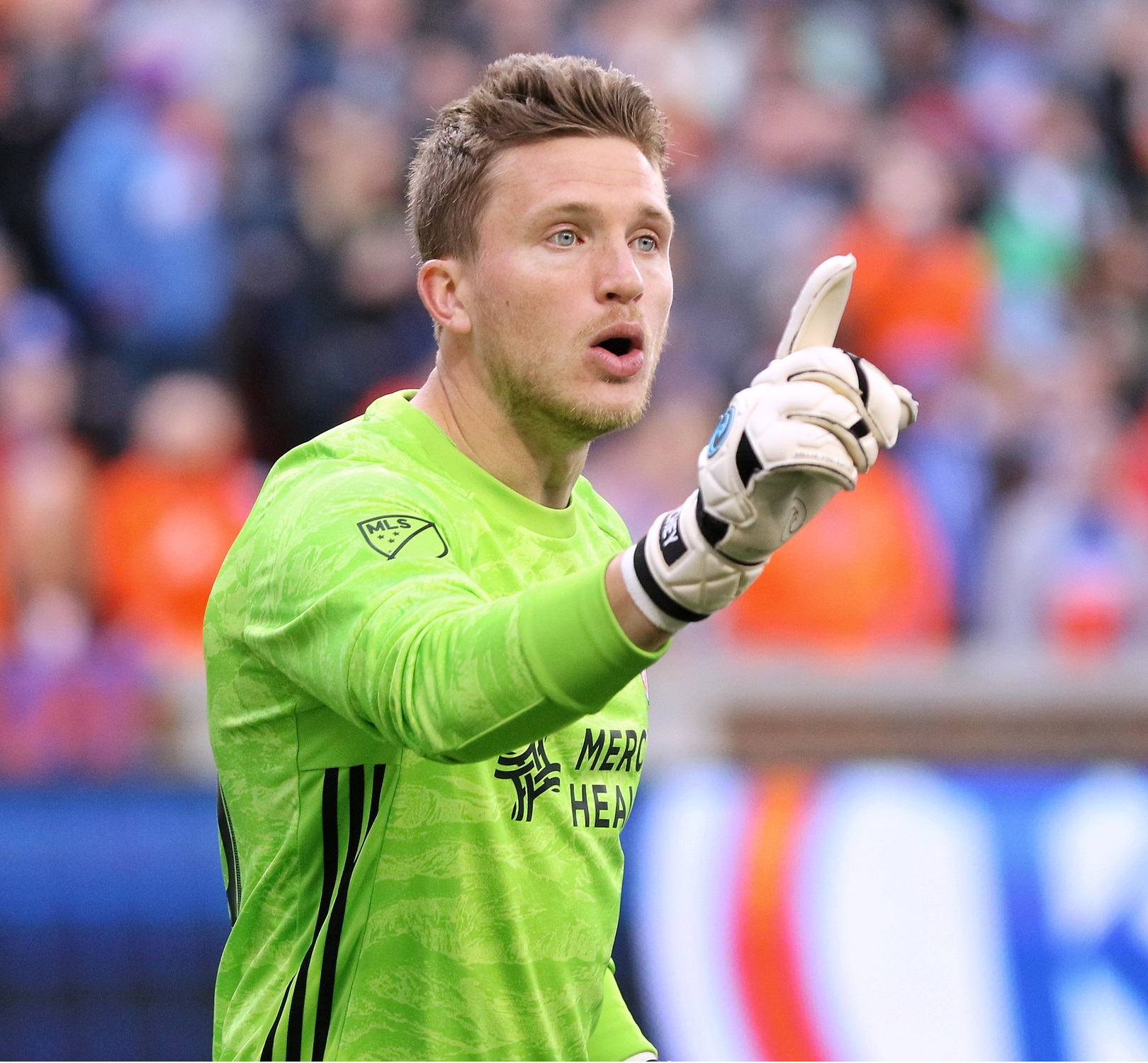
- Richey with FC Cincinnati in 2019

Personal information
- Full name: Spencer McNair Richey
- Date of birth: May 30, 1992 (age 34)
- Place of birth: Seattle, Washington, United States
- Height: 6 ft 1 in (1.85 m)
- Position: Goalkeeper

Youth career
- 2008–2009: IMG Academy
- 2009–2010: Crossfire Premier

College career
Years	Team	Apps	(Gls)
2010–2014	Washington Huskies	71	(0)

Senior career*
Years	Team	Apps	(Gls)
2010–2011	Tacoma Tide	10	(0)
2012	Portland Timbers U23s	14	(0)
2013	Washington Crossfire	8	(0)
2014	Puget Sound Gunners	2	(0)
2015–2016	Whitecaps FC 2	26	(0)
2017–2018	Vancouver Whitecaps FC	1	(0)
2017	→ Whitecaps FC 2	17	(0)
2018	→ FC Cincinnati (loan)	14	(0)
2019–2020	FC Cincinnati	29	(0)
2021	Seattle Sounders FC	2	(0)
2021	→ Tacoma Defiance	5	(0)
2022–2024	Chicago Fire	7	(0)
2023–2024	→ Chicago Fire II (loan)	4	(0)

International career^{‡}
2008–2009	United States U17	8	(0)
- * Club domestic league appearances and goals as of October 26, 2024 ‡ National team caps and goals as of April 2, 2015

Spencer McNair Richey (born May 30, 1992) is an American professional soccer player who plays as a goalkeeper.

== Career ==
=== College and amateur ===
Richey spent his entire college career at the University of Washington. He made a total of 71 appearances for the Huskies and finished with 30 clean sheets.

He also played in the Premier Development League for Tacoma Tide, Portland Timbers U23s, Washington Crossfire and Puget Sound Gunners.

=== Professional ===
On January 20, 2015, Richey was selected in the third round (61st overall) of the 2015 MLS SuperDraft by Vancouver Whitecaps FC. However he was cut from camp and he ended up joining USL affiliate club Whitecaps FC 2. He made his professional debut for the club on April 1 in a match against Austin Aztex.

Richey signed with Major League Soccer side Vancouver Whitecaps FC on December 19, 2016.

On November 22, 2017, the Whitecaps picked up Richey's team option and loaned him to FC Cincinnati for the 2018 season.

Richey was released by Vancouver at the end of their 2018 season. His MLS rights were subsequently traded to new MLS expansion side FC Cincinnati in December 2018 in exchange for a third-round selection in the 2020 MLS SuperDraft.

He was released by Cincinnati at the end of their 2020 season.

On February 2, 2021, it was announced that Richey signed with Seattle Sounders FC. Following the 2021 season, Seattle declined their contract option on Richey.

=== International ===
Richey was a member of the U.S. under-17 national team at the 2009 FIFA U-17 World Cup.

== Career statistics ==
=== Club ===
As of match played November 8, 2021

Appearances and goals by club, season and competition
Club	Season	League			National cup		Continental		Other		Total	
Club	Season	Division	Apps	Goals	Apps	Goals	Apps	Goals	Apps	Goals	Apps	Goals
Whitecaps FC 2	2015	USL	12	0	—		—		—		12	0
Whitecaps FC 2	2016	USL	14	0	—		—		3 (Note: Appearance(s) in USL Championship Playoffs)	0	17	0
Whitecaps FC 2	2017	USL	17	0	—		—		—		17	0
Whitecaps FC 2	Total		43	0	0	0	0	0	3	0	46	0
Vancouver Whitecaps FC	2017	MLS	1	0	2	0	2 (Note: Appearance(s) in CONCACAF Champions League)	0	—		5	0
FC Cincinnati (loan)	2018	USL	14	0	2	0	—		2	0	18	0
FC Cincinnati	2019	MLS	19	0	0	0	—		—		19	0
FC Cincinnati	2020	MLS	10	0	0	0	—		—		10	0
FC Cincinnati	Total		29	0	0	0	0	0	2	0	29	0
Seattle Sounders FC	2021	MLS	0	0	0	0	—		—		0	0
Tacoma Defiance	2021	USL	5	0	—		—		—		5	0
Career total			92	0	4	0	2	0	5	0	103	0
