= Jovan Blagojevic (soccer, born 1991) =

Canadian soccer player

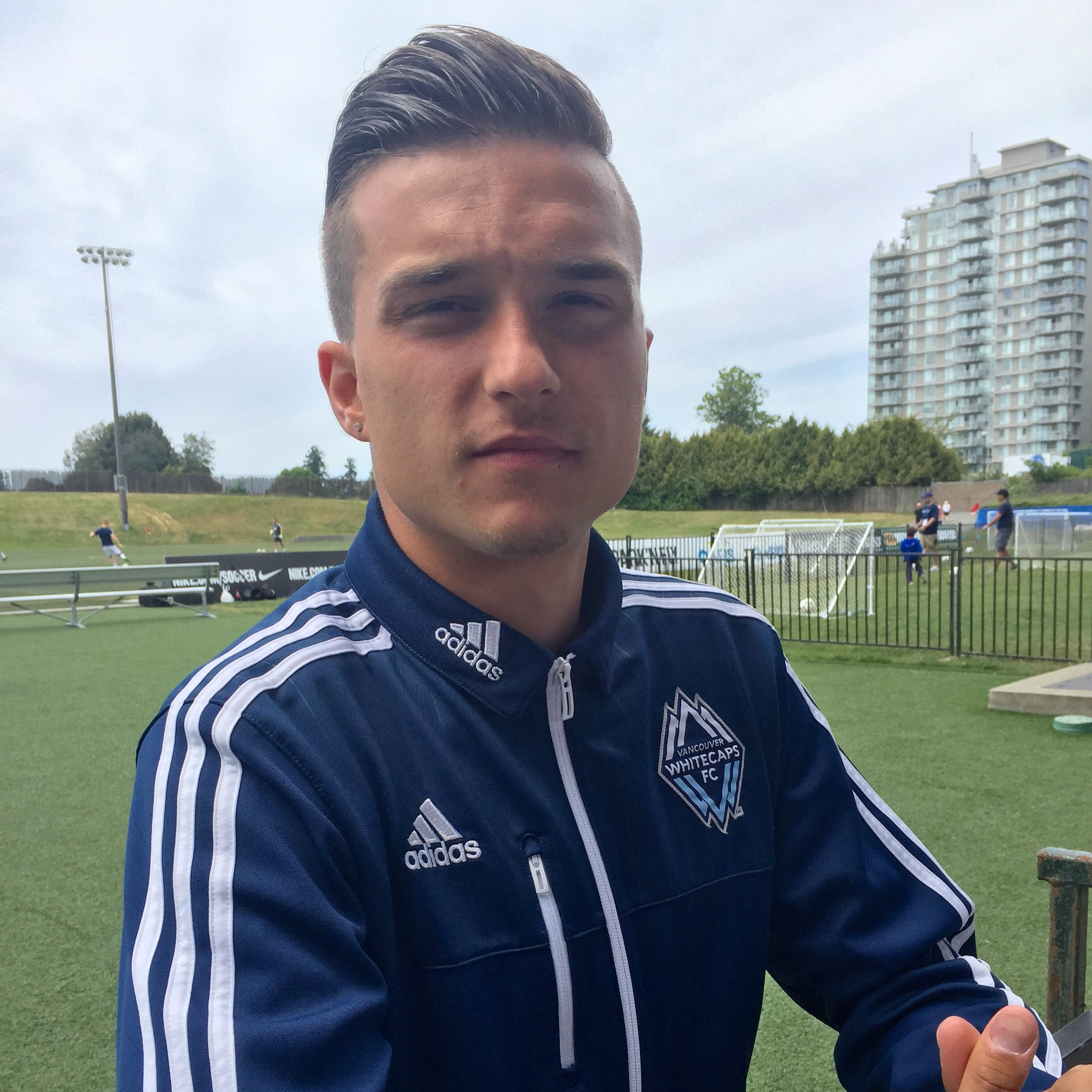
- Blagojevic in 2015

Personal information
- Date of birth: April 6, 1991 (age 35)
- Place of birth: Belgrade, SR Serbia, SFR Yugoslavia
- Height: 1.82 m (6 ft 0 in)
- Position: Forward

Youth career
- 2011–2014: Simon Fraser Clan

Senior career*
Years	Team	Apps	(Gls)
2015	Whitecaps FC 2	17	(0)
- * Club domestic league appearances and goals as of September 26, 2015

Jovan Blagojevic (Serbian Cyrillic: Јован Благојевић; born April 6, 1991) is a Canadian soccer player.

== Career ==
=== University and youth ===
Blagojevic played four years of university soccer at Simon Fraser University between 2011 and 2014.

=== Professional ===
On January 20, 2015, Blagojevic was selected 54th overall in the 2015 MLS SuperDraft by Vancouver Whitecaps FC. On February 24, 2015, he signed with Vancouver's USL side Whitecaps FC 2. His first game was in a 2–2 draw on May 17, 2015 against Oklahoma City Energy FC. He was not on the roster in 2016.
