= Craig Nitti =

American soccer player

Personal information
- Full name: Craig Alexander Nitti
- Date of birth: January 19, 1992 (age 34)
- Place of birth: Van Nuys, California, U.S.
- Height: 1.96 m (6 ft 5 in)
- Position: Defender

College career
Years	Team	Apps	(Gls)
2010–2014	Loyola Marymount Lions	70	(11)

Senior career*
Years	Team	Apps	(Gls)
2013	Portland Timbers U23s	9	(0)
2015	Whitecaps FC 2	18	(1)
2016	Orlando City B	14	(1)
- * Club domestic league appearances and goals as of October 6, 2016

Craig Alexander Nitti (born January 19, 1992) is an American retired soccer player.

== Career ==
=== College & Youth ===
Nitti played most of his youth soccer with the North Valley Fusion, an age group team in the Southern California Coast Soccer League. He competed for Crespi High School in Encino, CA where he was Mission League Defender of the Year, First Team All CIF Southern Section and NSCAA/adidas High School Boys All-Region VIII. In 2010, he competed on the BU18 Real SoCal Academy Team which took third in the National Championships at the Home Depot Center.

Nitti played five years of college soccer at Loyola Marymount University (LMU) between 2010 and 2014, including a red-shirted year in 2010. For his career at LMU, he made 59 starts, appeared in 70 total matches and logged 5720 minutes. The 6'5" 215 pound center back finished with 11 goals (4 game winners) and four assists. Among his honors: Mac Hermann Trophy Watch List 2014, two time NSCAA/Continental Tire All Far West Second Team, College Soccer Madness 4th Team All American and WCC Defender of the Year, three time ALL WCC (First Team 2013 and 2014), three time WCC All Academic Honorable Mention, three time Team Captain, LMU MVP/Most Valuable Defender/Most Inspirational/Goal of the Year 2014 and LMU Outstanding Male Scholar Athlete 2015.

=== Professional ===
On January 20, 2015, Nitti was selected 72nd overall in the 2015 MLS SuperDraft by Vancouver Whitecaps FC. On March 17, 2015, he signed with Vancouver's USL side Whitecaps FC 2. Nitti played 18 games with 15 starts and logged 1457 minutes. He was named to the USL Team of the Week 4/3/15 and appeared in 7 of the 8 Whitecaps season wins.

After a season with Whitecaps 2, Nitti signed with USL's Orlando City B on January 13, 2016. He started 14 games logging 1243 minutes and scored one goal.
