= Romeo Filipović =

German footballer

Personal information
- Date of birth: 31 March 1986 (age 40)
- Place of birth: Recklinghausen, Germany
- Height: 6 ft 3 in (1.91 m)
- Positions: Central midfielder; defender

Youth career
- 1998–2003: Schalke 04
- 2003–2004: Rot-Weiss Essen
- 2004–2005: Duisburg

Senior career*
Years	Team	Apps	(Gls)
2005–2006	VfB Homberg	4	(0)
2006	U Craiova 1948	0	(0)
2007	SV Spittal/Drau	8	(2)
2007	Al-Ahli	16	(4)
2008	Željezničar	4	(0)
2008–2009	U Craiova 1948		
2009	Ayr United	0	(0)
2010	Bontang	26	(6)
2011	Karlovac	5	(0)
2011	Sloboda Tuzla	6	(0)
2012	Mendrisio	8	(0)
2012	Koper	8	(0)
2013-2014	Imotski	14	(2)
2015	OC Blues	4	(0)
2015	Arizona United	10	(0)
2016	Persela Lamongan	2	(0)
- * Club domestic league appearances and goals

Romeo Filipović (born 31 March 1986) is a German retired footballer who finished his career in 2017.

== Club career ==
Filipović had spells in Austria with SV Spittal/Drau, in Scotland with Ayr United and in the United States with OC Blues
