= Michael Kallbäck =

Swedish association football agent and footballer

- Born: 19 March 1985 (age 41); Katukithula, Gampola, Kandy District, Central Province, Sri Lanka
- Occupations: business person, sports agent
- Known for: Neverland Management
- Spouse: Frida
- Children: 2 (Charlie and Zoe)

Michael Gamini Kallbäck (born 19 March 1985) is a Sri Lankan-born Swedish footballer, businessman and football player agent who previously worked as a sports manager in the Swedish football clubs Ängelholms FF and IK Brage. He is the current CEO of the Neverland Management, a football sports agency.

== Early life ==
Kallbäck was born on 19 March 1985 in a tiny village in Katukithula, Gampola, Central Province, Sri Lanka. However, he was adopted by his Swedish parents from the orphanage of St Leonard's Home in Gampola. He was considered as an orphan at that time and was adopted when he was just two months old. He grew up and raised up in Degerfors, Värmland County, in Sweden. His Swedish parents had revealed about his Sri Lankan roots only after he became an adult and Michael insisted that he never thought of being a Sri Lankan at all during his young age.

== Career ==
Kallbäck started playing club football playing for Degerfors IF which is one of the prominent classical football teams in Sweden. However, his playing career was cut short and he began his coaching career. He got his first UEFA A license and became the sport director and manager of two Swedish clubs Ängelholms FF and IK Brage. He ended his coaching stint with IK Brage in 2013 and then started up his own company as a sports agent.

He founded the Neverland Management in 2014 and since its inception, it has been predominantly active in promoting women's football. He serves as the CEO of the sports agency since 2014 and it has become one of the leading sports agencies in the world concentrating in women's football under his leadership. He initially focused representing only male players but after the birth of his first daughter Charlie, he also began representing the women players.

As a player agent, he represents players such as Nikola Durdic, Nadia Nadim, Amor Layouni, Johan Bertilsson, Vladimir Rodic, Sofia Jakobsson, Julia Zigiotti Olme, Romain Gall, Marcus Degerlund and Elizabeth Addo. Kallbäck was early on the Swedish market to represent both men's and women's players and he is regarded as one of the few agents to represent both men and women in football. He had also involved in popular transfers such as Danish forward Martin Braithwaite to FC Barcelona, Swedish goalkeeper Robin Olsen to AS Roma, Sofia Jakobsson to Real Madrid and Afghan refugee turned footballer Nadia Nadim to Paris Saint Germain.

In 2016, Kallbäck appeared in the Danish documentary "Nadia Nadim Angriber", a documentary based on influential Afghan-Danish footballer Nadia Nadim. He appeared in 2 episodes which was shown on Danish DR1 and later on SVT.

== Personal life ==
He began exploring about his personal history in 2014. He also reportedly met his biological mother Neetha Kumarasinghe during a trip to Sri Lanka when he was curious and eager to find his connection to Sri Lanka. He made his first visit to Sri Lanka in February 2015 in search of his Sri Lankan mother. He came to Colombo with his Sinhala language birth certificate and a small photo of his mother. He almost gave up his attempt in search of his original mother when he returned to his birthplace Gampola. However, he finally got to know that his mother was living in Qatar while he had embarked on his journey to Sri Lanka. Having spent most of his lifetime in Sweden, he was married to Swedish woman Frida and the couple has two children; Charlie and Zoe. He currently lives in Stockholm.

Kallbäck participated in 2019 in the podcast Studio Allsvenskan, where he told, among other things, that his mentor was Hasan Cetinkaya.
