= Lucas Baldin =

Brazilian footballer (born 1991)

Personal information
- Full name: Lucas Victor Baldin
- Date of birth: June 5, 1991 (age 35)
- Place of birth: Taubaté, Brazil
- Height: 1.75 m (5 ft 9 in)
- Position: Midfielder

Team information
- Current team: ACD Lara

Youth career
- 2007–2009: Cruz Azul
- 2009–2011: Toluca

College career
Years	Team	Apps	(Gls)
2011–2014	South Florida Bulls	59	(10)

Senior career*
Years	Team	Apps	(Gls)
2011	Bradenton Academics	13	(1)
2012	Reading United	7	(0)
2013	Seattle Sounders FC U-23	2	(0)
2014	Reading United	1	(0)
2015	Real Monarchs	23	(4)
2016–	ACD Lara	22	(2)
- * Club domestic league appearances and goals as of February 2, 2016

Lucas Victor Baldin (born June 5, 1991) is a retired Brazilian footballer who lastly played for ACD Lara in the Venezuelan Primera División.

== Career ==
=== Youth, college and amateur ===
Baldin was a member of the Cruz Azul and Toluca youth system before moving to the United States to play college soccer at the University of South Florida.

In his career with the Bulls, Baldin made a total of 69 appearances and tallied 10 goals and nine assists. In his senior season, he was named one of the 16 semifinalists for the Hermann Trophy. Also, he received NSCAA Scholar All-America First Team honors, as well as NSCAA East All-Region First Team, First Team All-American Athletic Conference, and American Athletic Conference All-Tournament Team honors. In 2013/2014, he was also named USF Male Scholar Athlete of the year.

During his time in college, Baldin also played in the Premier Development League for Bradenton Academics, Reading United and Seattle Sounders FC U-23.

=== Professional ===
On January 20, 2015, Baldin was selected in the fourth round (75th overall) of the 2015 MLS SuperDraft by Real Salt Lake. After excelling in preseason with Real Salt Lake, on March 6, it was announced that Baldin signed a professional contract with the Real Salt Lake organization where he became the first ever captain for Real Monarchs SLC, a USL affiliate club of RSL. He made his professional debut on March 22 in a 0–0 draw against LA Galaxy II.

On January 25, 2016, it was announced that Baldin had been signed by Venezuelan club ACD Lara.

Nowadays, Lucas Baldin is a sports and fitness entrepreneur. He owns a college recruitment called Be One Sports and Education and a fitness studio called Carpe Diem Mindful Training. Both companies are based in Mexico City, Mexico.
