= Alex Shinsky =

American former soccer player (born 1993)

Personal information
- Full name: Joseph Alexander Shinsky
- Date of birth: April 2, 1993 (age 33)
- Place of birth: York, Pennsylvania, United States
- Height: 1.78 m (5 ft 10 in)
- Position: Midfielder

Youth career
- SuperNova FC
- 2008–2009: IMG Academy
- 2009–2011: Baltimore Bays Chelsea
- 2011–2014: Maryland Terrapins

Senior career*
Years	Team	Apps	(Gls)
2013	Baltimore Bohemians	4	(0)
2015	Arizona United	7	(0)

International career^{‡}
2008–2009	United States U17	14	(2)

Managerial career
- 2017–2018: Army Black Knights (volunteer assistant)
- 2018–2019: Army Black Knights (assistant)
- 2019–: Temple Owls (assistant)
- * Club domestic league appearances and goals as of March 5, 2021 ‡ National team caps and goals as of April 23, 2015

Joseph Alexander Shinsky (born April 2, 1993) is an American former soccer player who is currently an assistant coach for the Temple Owls.

== Career ==
=== Early ===
During his high school years Shinsky was a part of the U.S. U-17 National Team, while competing with them he scored a goal in the FIFA World Cup in Malawi.

Shinsky played club soccer for SuperNova FC and coach Niki Nikolic.

Shinsky was ranked as one of the top recruits in the nation.

=== College ===
Shinsky began his college soccer career at the University of Maryland. In 2011, he made 11 appearances and recorded two assists. In his second season with the Terrapins in 2012, he appeared in 19 games and again registered two assists while helping the Terps become the ACC Champions. In 2013, he appeared in 16 games and scored his first collegiate goal in a 2–1 win in the NCAA tournament quarterfinal match against California to help get Maryland to the College Cup. In 2014, he made 10 appearances, captained the team and notched two goals and two assists.

=== Professional ===
Shinsky was drafted in the fourth round (68th overall) of the 2015 MLS SuperDraft by the Chicago Fire. However, he was not signed by the club.

Shinsky later joined USL Pro club Arizona United.

=== Coaching ===
Shinsky spent two years working with the Army Black Knights men's soccer team before joining the staff of the Temple Owls.

== Honors ==
=== Maryland Terrapins ===
- ACC Conference Champions (2): 2012, 2013
- Big Ten Conference Champions (1): 2014
