= Tyler Ruthven =

American soccer player (born 1988)

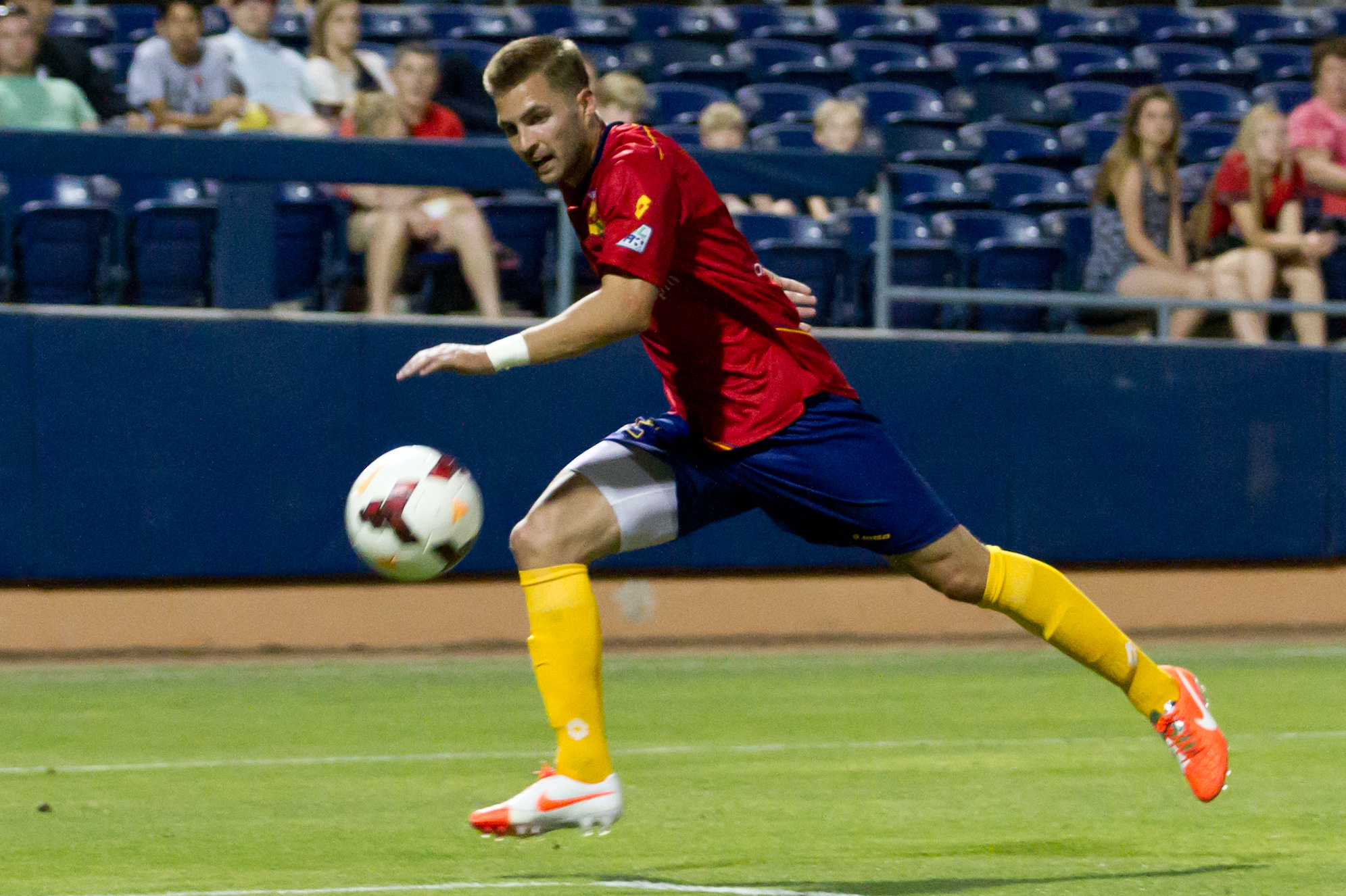
- Ruthven playing for Arizona United SC, 2014

Personal information
- Full name: Tyler John Ruthven
- Date of birth: July 18, 1988 (age 38)
- Place of birth: Alpharetta, Georgia, United States
- Height: 6 ft 2 in (1.88 m)
- Position: Defender

Youth career
- Concorde Fire Elite

College career
Years	Team	Apps	(Gls)
2006	San Francisco Dons	19	(0)
2007–2009	South Carolina Gamecocks	55	(1)

Senior career*
Years	Team	Apps	(Gls)
2008	Colorado Rapids U-23	15	(0)
2009	Chicago Fire Premier	10	(1)
2010	Harrisburg City Islanders	8	(1)
2011	Atlanta Silverbacks	27	(1)
2012	New York Red Bulls	5	(0)
2013	IK Brage	12	(0)
2013	KuPS	7	(0)
2014–2015	Arizona United	46	(1)
2016	Jacksonville Armada	32	(1)
2017	Miami FC	6	(0)
2018	Miami FC 2	14	(0)
2018–2019	Atlanta United 2	13	(0)
- * Club domestic league appearances and goals

Tyler Ruthven (born July 18, 1988) is an American former professional soccer player who played as a defender.

== Career ==
=== College and amateur ===
Ruthven attended Roswell High School and Milton High School and played club soccer for the Concorde Fire Elite, before beginning his college soccer career at the University of San Francisco. He transferred to the University of South Carolina as a sophomore in 2007, where he received numerous awards and accolades, being named Conference USA Newcomer of the Year and to the All-Conference USA Third Team and the NSCAA All-South Third Team in 2007, All-Conference USA Second Team as a Junior, and collecting First-Team All-Conference USA honors and being named to the NSCAA All-South Third Team as a senior.

During his college years Ruthven also played in the USL Premier Development League with Colorado Rapids U23's and Chicago Fire Premier.

=== Professional ===
Ruthven turned professional in 2010 when he signed with the Harrisburg City Islanders of the USL Second Division. He made his professional debut on July 3, 2010, in a game against the Charlotte Eagles, and scored his first professional goal on July 10 in a 3–2 victory over the Real Maryland Monarchs.

Ruthven signed with Atlanta Silverbacks of the North American Soccer League on March 7, 2011. Ruthven earned his first league honors on July 26, 2011, winning the NASL Defensive Player of the Week. He re-signed with Atlanta on January 30, 2012, but was allowed to go on trial with New York Red Bulls.

On March 5, 2012, Ruthven agreed to terms with the New York Red Bulls of Major League Soccer after impressing during his trial stint. His first appearance in MLS came in the second half of the April 22, 2012, match against D.C. United. Ruthven then started the club's next three matches, helping New York to three consecutive clean sheets (all 1-0 victories). On November 19, 2012, the Red Bulls announced it declined options for an additional 6 players, having released 4 a week earlier, with Ruthven included in the mix. In 2013, he rejoined the New York Red Bulls during preseason and earned a contract. However, the contract was revoked before the 2013 season began.

On March 28, 2013, Ruthven agreed to terms with IK Brage of Superettan after impressing the team's sport director Michael Kallback.

After becoming a regular in the lineup the first half of the season with IK Brage, the club ran into some difficulties and Ruthven left on a free transfer during the summer window to KuPS in Finland.

On October 1, 2019, after two seasons with USL Championship side Atlanta United 2, Ruthven announced he would retire from playing professional soccer.

== Personal ==
He is the son of former Major League Baseball pitcher Dick Ruthven.
