= George Malki =

American soccer player (born 1992)

Personal information
- Full name: George Emmanuel Malki
- Date of birth: April 21, 1992 (age 34)
- Place of birth: Chicago, Illinois, United States
- Height: 6 ft 0 in (1.83 m)
- Positions: Midfielder; defender

Youth career
- 2001–2008: Sereno Soccer Club
- 2008–2009: IMG Academy
- 2010–2013: Cal Poly Mustangs

Senior career*
Years	Team	Apps	(Gls)
2014–2015	Arizona United	28	(1)
2016	Rio Grande Valley FC	25	(1)
2017–2018	Houston Dynamo	0	(0)

International career
2008–2009	United States U17		
- * Club domestic league appearances and goals as of 13:45, October 26, 2017 (UTC)

George Emmanuel Malki (born April 21, 1992) is an American soccer player.

== Career ==
=== Early career ===
Born in Chicago, Illinois, Malki started playing soccer in Arizona where he played for the Pinnacle Pioneers at Pinnacle High School. In 2009, Malki won the Gatorade Player of the Year award for the state of Arizona in his final year of High School. While still in high school, Malki maintained a 3.90 GPA and also volunteered his time working for a local non-profit called Students Supporting Brain Tumor Research (SSBTR).

=== College ===
Malki attended California Polytechnic State University, San Luis Obispo in San Luis Obispo, CA. George was a regular starter for the Mustangs and scored his first collegiate goal as a junior against Temple University.

=== Professional career ===
Malki was drafted 37th overall by Montreal Impact in the 2014 MLS SuperDraft.

Malki signed with USL Pro club Arizona United on August 15, 2014.

Malki signed with USL's Rio Grande Valley FC on February 2, 2016.

On March 1, 2017, Malki signed with MLS side Houston Dynamo.
