= Josh Phillips (soccer) =

American soccer player

Personal information
- Full name: Joshua Phillips
- Date of birth: November 6, 1991 (age 34)
- Place of birth: Seattle, Washington, United States
- Height: 1.83 m (6 ft 0 in)
- Position: Defender

Youth career
- 2007–2008: Washington Premier FC
- 2008–2009: Crossfire Premier

College career
| Years | Team | Apps | (Gls) |
| 2010–2013 | Gonzaga Bulldogs | | |

Senior career*
| Years | Team | Apps | (Gls) |
| 2011–2012 | Washington Crossfire | 13 | (1) |
| 2013 | Seattle Sounders FC U-23 | 7 | (1) |
| 2014 | FC Tucson | 10 | (0) |
| 2015–2017 | Colorado Springs Switchbacks | 75 | (2) |
| 2018 | Portland Timbers 2 | 12 | (1) |
- * Club domestic league appearances and goals as of October 15, 2018

Joshua "Josh" Phillips (born November 6, 1991) is an American soccer player.

== Career ==
=== Youth, college and amateur ===
Phillips began his youth career with Washington Premier FC where he played from 2007 to 2008 before joining the Washington Crossfire Academy. Phillips signed a letter of intent to play college soccer at Gonzaga University of the West Coast Conference (WCC).

In four seasons with the Bulldogs, Phillips appeared in 71 games, scoring once and recording two assists. Phillips' loan goal, a game winner, came against Loyola Marymount University during the 2011 season. His two career assists came against Loyola and Long Island University, in 2010 and 2011, respectively. Following his final season at Gonzaga, Phillips became second Gonzaga player to receive WCC Defender of the Year honors while also being named third team all-Far West region.

Phillips also spent time with Seattle Sounders FC U-23 in the USL Premier Development League in 2013, appearing in seven games and scoring a stoppage-time goal to tie local rival Kitsap Pumas.

Following unsuccessful trials in Germany with MSV Duisburg and VfL Osnabrück, he signed with FC Tucson, also of the PDL. He appeared in 10 games, recording an assist.

=== Professional ===
Phillips played with the Seattle Sounders FC Reserves against the Colorado Rapids Reserves in October 2014. He signed his first professional contract with the Colorado Springs Switchbacks FC, a new USL Pro franchise set to begin play in 2015. Phillips was their fifth signing, with Luke Vercollone being their first. After being named to the USL Team of the Week bench in May 2015, Josh was voted on the full team after standout performances against Vancouver Whitecaps FC 2 and Orange County Blues in June 2015.

Following a successful debut professional season in Colorado, Phillips was invited by the New England Revolution of Major League Soccer for their pre-season camp.

Phillips signed with Portland Timbers 2 for the 2018 season after spending three seasons with the Switchbacks.

Owner of Spawnflyfish out of Oregon.

== Honors ==
=== Individual ===
- Third team All-West Coast Conference: 2013
- Defender Of The Year - West Coast Conference: 2013
