= Christopher Ramírez =

Salvadoran footballer (born 1990)

Personal information
- Full name: Danis Christopher Ramírez
- Date of birth: February 2, 1990 (age 36)
- Place of birth: San Salvador, El Salvador
- Height: 5 ft 10 in (1.78 m)
- Position: Forward

Youth career
- 2009–2010: Atlético Marte

Senior career*
Years	Team	Apps	(Gls)
2011	Sonsonate		
2011–2016	Atlético Marte		
2015	→ Orange County Blues (loan)		
2016–2018	Alianza		
2017	→ Sonsonate (loan)		
2018	Luis Ángel Firpo	28	(14)
2019	Jocoro F.C.	0	(0)
- * Club domestic league appearances and goals

Danis Christopher Ramírez (born February 2, 1990, in San Salvador) is a Salvadoran professional footballer.

== Club career ==
=== Atlético Marte ===
Ramírez began his career in the reserve team of Atlético Marte, before joining the main squad in 2011.

During his four years there he played 98 games and scored 29 goals, becoming their highest goalscorer in the Apertura/Clausura format for the team.

=== Orange County Blues FC ===
He signed for the Orange County Blues FC of the USL in 2015, where he scored 8 goals in 25 appearances and achieved 1st place in the Western Conference.

In December, his loan expired and he returned to Atlético Marte.

=== Return to Atlético Marte ===
Ramírez returned to Atlético Marte for the Clausura 2016, but the team ended up descending to Segunda División at the end of the tournament.

=== Alianza ===
In May 2016, Ramírez signed with Alianza for the Apertura 2016 tournament.

=== Loan to Sonsonate ===
In 2017, Ramírez played a loan with Sonsonate.

=== Luis Ángel Firpo ===
In 2018, Ramírez signed with Luis Ángel Firpo. With the team of Usulután, Ramírez experienced a serious institutional, economic and sports crisis, in addition to arrears in salary payments. Despite this, Ramírez became one of the team's top scorers in the Apertura 2018 with 9 goals.

Ramírez scored a hat-trick in a 3–4 defeat against Isidro Metapán at the Estadio Cuscatlán in August 2018. In December 2018, Ramírez's contract was not renewed by Luis Ángel Firpo.

== Honors ==
- Orange County Blues
  - United Soccer League Western Conference (Regular Season) (1): 2015
