= Kley Bejarano =

Colombian footballer (born 1989)

Personal information
- Full name: Kleyner Bejarano Mena
- Date of birth: 16 September 1989 (age 37)
- Place of birth: Unguía, Colombia
- Height: 1.72 m (5 ft 8 in)
- Position: Defender

Senior career*
Years	Team	Apps	(Gls)
2007	Expreso Rojo		
2008–2010	Barranquilla		
2011	Cortuluá	14	(0)
2013	Fortaleza	9	(0)
2014	Los Angeles Misioneros	10	(1)
2015	Colorado Springs Switchbacks	18	(0)
2018–	Orange County FC	4	(0)
- * Club domestic league appearances and goals as of 13 May 2019

Kleyner Bejarano Mena (born 16 September 1989) is a Colombian footballer who plays for Orange County FC.

== Career ==
Bejarano began his career with Expreso Rojo, before having stints with Barranquilla, Cortuluá and Fortaleza in his native Colombia.

In 2014, Bejarano moved to the United States, where he signed with USL PDL club Los Angeles Misioneros. After a season with the club, he moved to USL club Colorado Springs Switchbacks, signing with the club on February 13, 2015.
