= Jonathan Top =

Guatemalan footballer

Personal information
- Full name: Jonathan Top
- Date of birth: January 26, 1993 (age 33)
- Place of birth: Fort Worth, Texas, United States
- Height: 1.73 m (5 ft 8 in)
- Position: Forward

Youth career
- 2008–2011: FC Dallas

Senior career*
Years	Team	Apps	(Gls)
2011–2014	FC Dallas	4	(1)
2014	→ Arizona United (loan)	21	(5)
2015	Arizona United	23	(3)
2016	C.S.D. Comunicaciones	22	(1)

International career
2012–2013	United States U20	5	(0)
2015	Guatemala U23	1	(0)
- * Club domestic league appearances and goals as of 5 May 2017

Jonathan Top (born January 26, 1993) is a former professional footballer. Born in the United States, he represented both the United States and Guatemala at youth level.

== Early life ==
Top is the son of a Mexican mother and a Guatemalan father. He has three siblings: two sisters and one brother. Top attended North Side High School in Fort Worth, Texas, where he played American football and football. Top graduated in 2011.

== Career ==
On January 12, 2011, Top signed with FC Dallas as the club's fifth Homegrown Player. On April 25, 2012, Top made his professional debut for the club in a 1–1 draw at home against Real Salt Lake.
