= Max Rauhofer =

Uruguayan footballer (born 1990)

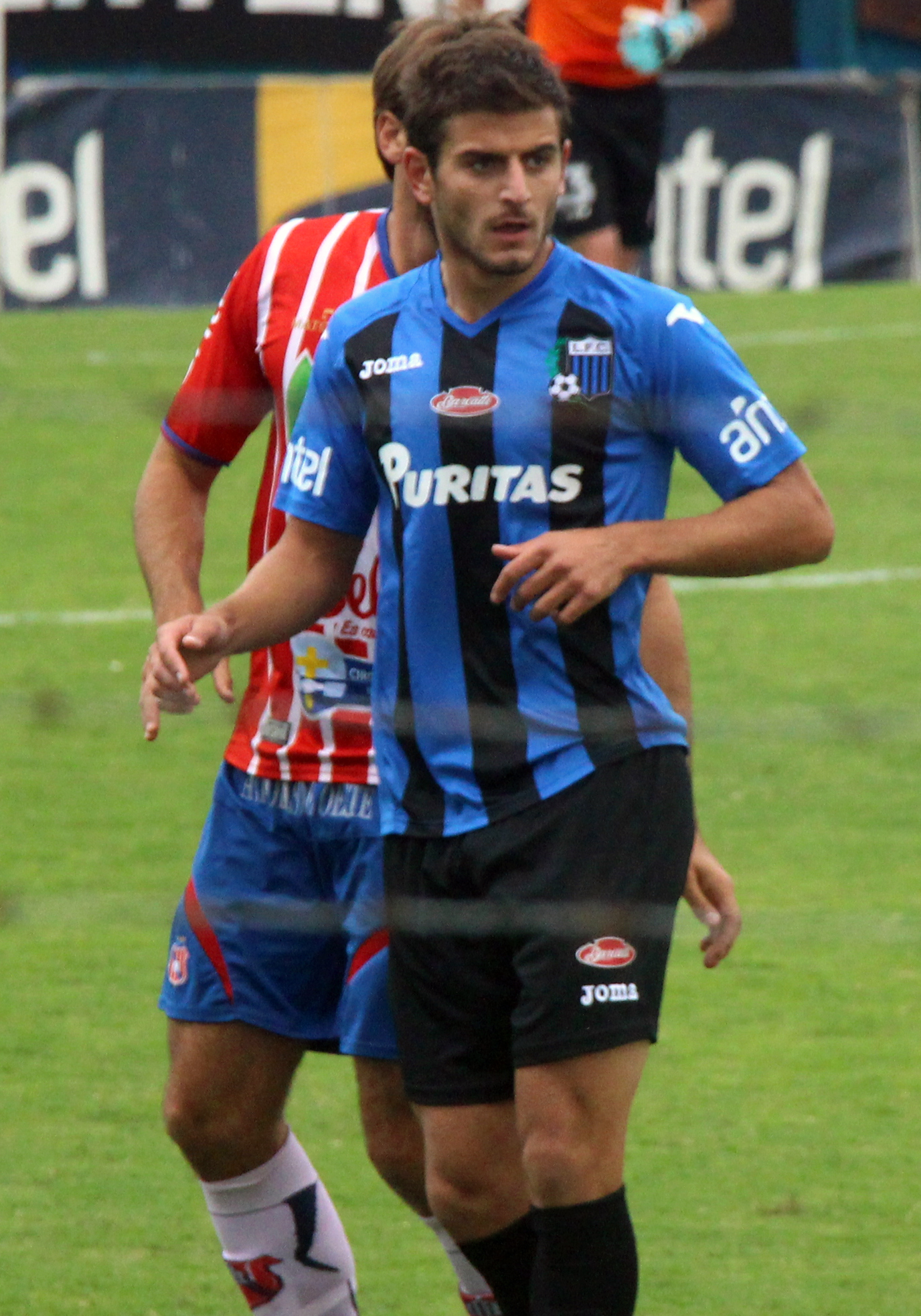
- Rauhofer with Liverpool, 2013

Personal information
- Full name: Max Rauhofer Federico
- Date of birth: 28 October 1990 (age 36)
- Place of birth: Maldonado, Uruguay
- Height: 1.84 m (6 ft 1/2 in)
- Position: Forward

Team information
- Current team: Cibao FC
- Number: 22

Senior career*
Years	Team	Apps	(Gls)
2005–2007	Deportivo Maldonado		
2007–2009	Albacete Balompié B		
2010–2013	Liverpool	26	(4)
2013–2014	Sud América	20	(2)
2015–2016	Real Monarchs SLC	17	(9)
2016	Guillermo Brown	10	(2)
2016–2017	Orange County Blues	7	(3)
2017–2018	Deportivo Maldonado	31	(8)
2018–2019	Guillermo Brown	18	(1)
2019–	Cibao FC		
- * Club domestic league appearances and goals as of 20:20, 22 September 2019 (UTC)

Max "Tanque" Rauhofer (born 28 October 1990) is a Uruguayan footballer who currently plays for Cibao FC of the Liga Dominicana de Fútbol.

== Career ==
Rauhofer began his professional career at age 14 with hometown club Deportivo Maldonado. He remained with the club until 2007 when he signed with Spanish club Albacete Balompié B, the reserve side of Albacete Balompié, that competed in the Tercera División. In 2010, Rauhofer returned to Uruguay and signed with Liverpool of the Uruguayan Primera División, the top tier of football in Uruguay. In total, Rauhofer made 26 appearances and scored 4 goals for Liverpool. After four years with the club Rauhofer transferred to Sud América, also of the Primera División, where he stayed for two seasons. During his time with the club, he tallied 2 goals in 20 league appearances. During his time in South America, Rauhofer competed in both the Copa Libertadores and the Copa Sudamericana.

On 15 April 2015, it was announced that Rauhofer had signed for Real Monarchs SLC, the reserve side of Real Salt Lake of Major League Soccer, that competed in the USL, the third tier of the United States soccer league system. It was announced that the player had already received his international transfer clearance and would be available for the club's next match, an away fixture at Colorado Springs Switchbacks two days later. Rauhofer went on to debut and score his first goal, a header off of a cross from Ricardo Velazco, in the eventual 2–5 defeat.

After a spell with Guillermo Brown, Rauhofer returned to the United States when he signed with Orange County Blues on 12 August 2016.

== Personal ==
Rauhofer also holds Italian citizenship.
