= 2017 Real Monarchs season =

Real Monarchs
2017 season
- Owner: Dell Loy Hansen
- Head coach: Mark Briggs
- Stadium: Rio Tinto Stadium
- Top goalscorer: Chandler Hoffman (16)
- Biggest win: SLC 5–2 COL (5/20); SLC 4–1 SEA (7/8); RNO 0–3 SLC (9/30)
- Biggest defeat: TUL 2–0 SLC (7/1); OKC 2–0 SLC (8/5)
Home colors	Away colors

The 2017 Real Monarchs season was the club's third season of existence, and their third season in the United Soccer League.

== Background ==
Real Monarchs finished the 2016 season with 10 wins, six draws and 14 losses. They finished 11th in the Western Conference and failed to qualify for the playoffs. Ricardo Velazco lead the Monarchs will six goals during the season. Velazco signed an MLS contract with their parent club, Real Salt Lake ahead of the 2017 season.

== Transfers ==
=== In ===
No.	Pos.	Nat.	Name	Age	Moving from	Type	Transfer window	Ends	Transfer fee	Source
29	MF	(Mexico)	José Hernández	21	Real Salt Lake	Loan	Pre-season	2018	Free	
43	MF	(United States)	Nick Besler	24	Portland Timbers	Transfer	Pre-season	2018	Free	
44	MF	(United States)	Kyle Curinga	23	FF Jaro (Finland)	Transfer	Pre-season	2018	Free	
46	FW	(Canada)	Daniel Haber	24	Whitecaps FC 2 (Canada)	Transfer	Pre-season	2018	Free	
46	MF	(United States)	Chase Minter	24	Sacramento Republic	Transfer	Pre-season	2018	Free	
49	FW	(United States)	Chandler Hoffman	26	Louisville City	Transfer	Pre-season	2018	Free	
51	GK	(United States)	Andrew Putna	22	UIC Flames	Transfer	Pre-season	2018	Free	
53	DF	(United States)	Michael Gallagher	22	Portland Timbers 2	Transfer	Pre-season	2018	Free	
55	MF	(Colombia)	Sebastián Velásquez	26	Rayo OKC	Transfer	Pre-season	2018	Free	
56	FW	(United States)	Skyler Milne	23	Utah Valley Wolverines	Transfer	Pre-season	2018	Free	
57	MF	(United States)	Karsten Hanlin	23	Denver Pioneers	Transfer	Pre-season	2018	Free	
58	FW	(Haiti)	Jonel Désiré	20	Mirebalais (Haiti)	Transfer	Pre-season	2018	Undisclosed	

=== Out ===
No.	Pos.	Nat.	Name	Age	Moving to	Type	Transfer window	Transfer fee	Source
4	MF	(United States)	Riley McGovern	25		Released	Off-season	Free	
5	MF	(Brazil)	Lennon	25		Released	Off-season	Free	
6	MF	(United States)	Alec Sundly	24	HIF (Sweden)	Free	Off-season	Free	
7	FW	(Guinea-Bissau)	Eti Tavares	23	Fresno Fuego	Free	Off-season	Free	
9	FW	(Jamaica)	Kevaughn Frater	22	Harbour View (Jamaica)	End of loan	Off-season	Free	
10	MF	(United States)	Ricardo Velazco	24	Real Salt Lake	Promoted	Off-season	Free	
14	FW	(United States)	Colin Rolfe	27		Released	Off-season	Free	
15	DF	(Honduras)	Elder Torres	22	Vida (Honduras)	End of loan	Off-season	Free	
16	MF	(Ghana)	Amass Amankona	21	Dayton Dutch Lions	Released	Off-season	Free	
19	MF	(United States)	Tyler Arnone	25	Long Island Rough Riders	Released	Off-season	Free	
20	MF	(United States)	Edgar Duran	21		Released	Off-season	Free	
21	DF	(Argentina)	Jonathan Caparelli	22		Released	Off-season	Free	
22	DF	(United States)	Darion Copeland	24		Released	Off-season	Free	
24	GK	(United States)	Eric Osswald	25		Released	Off-season	Free	
28	GK	(United States)	Chris Schuler	29	Real Salt Lake	Promoted	Off-season	Free	

=== From RSL Academy ===
N	Pos.	Nat.	Name	Age	Notes
60	DF	(United States)	Riggs Lennon	22	
99	GK	(United States)	Jared Osgood	18	

== Competitions ==
=== USL ===
==== Table ====
Pos	Team	Pld	W	D	L	GF	GA	GD	Pts	Qualification
1	Real Monarchs (X)	32	20	7	5	59	31	+28	67	Conference Playoffs
2	San Antonio FC	32	17	11	4	45	24	+21	62	Conference Playoffs
3	Reno 1868 FC	32	17	8	7	75	39	+36	59	Conference Playoffs
4	Swope Park Rangers	32	17	7	8	55	37	+18	58	Conference Playoffs
5	Phoenix Rising FC	32	17	7	8	50	37	+13	58	Conference Playoffs

Source: 2017 USL standings
Rules for classification: 1) total wins; 2) total goal differential; 3) total goals scored; 4) points earned against top four Conference finishers; 5) disciplinary points; 6) coin toss or drawing of lots
(X) Regular Season League Champion

==== Results ====
March 25 1	Portland Timbers 2	1–2	Real Monarchs	Portland, Oregon
20:30 MST		Report		Stadium: Providence Park

April 1 2	Real Monarchs	2–0	Phoenix Rising	Sandy, Utah
16:00 MST		Report		Stadium: Rio Tinto Stadium

April 6 3	Real Monarchs	5–3	Reno 1868	Sandy, Utah
19:00 MST		Report		Stadium: Rio Tinto Stadium

April 15 4	Colorado Springs Switchbacks	2–1	Real Monarchs	Colorado Springs, Colorado
19:00 MST		Report		Stadium: Weidner Field

April 22 5	Seattle Sounders FC 2	1–3	Real Monarchs	Tukwila, Washington
20:00 MST		Report		Stadium: Starfire Sports Complex

April 29 6	Real Monarchs	2–1	Swope Park Rangers	Sandy, Utah
16:00 MST		Report		Stadium: Rio Tinto Stadium

May 10 7	LA Galaxy II	0–3	Real Monarchs	Carson, California
20:30 MST		Report		Stadium: StubHub Center Track Stadium

May 13 8	Real Monarchs	2–0	Sacramento Republic	Sandy, Utah
19:30 MST		Report		Stadium: Rio Tinto Stadium

May 20 9	Real Monarchs	5–2	Colorado Springs Switchbacks	Sandy, Utah
19:00 MST		Report		Stadium: Rio Tinto Stadium

May 28 10	Whitecaps FC 2	1–2	Real Monarchs	Langley, British Columbia
19:00 MST		Report		Stadium: McLeod Athletic Park

June 3 11	Orange County	0–1	Real Monarchs	Irvine, California
19:00 MST		Report		Stadium: Orange County Great Park

June 10 12	Real Monarchs	2–0	Portland Timbers 2	Sandy, Utah
19:00 MST		Report		Stadium: Rio Tinto Stadium; Attendance: 2,707

June 19 13	Real Monarchs	2–1	Reno 1868	Sandy, Utah
19:00 MST		Report		Stadium: Rio Tinto Stadium; Attendance: 2,321

June 24 14	Phoenix Rising	1–1	Real Monarchs	Tempe, Arizona
20:00 MST		Report		Stadium: Phoenix Rising FC Soccer Complex; Attendance: 6,365

July 1 15	Tulsa Roughnecks	2–0	Real Monarchs	Tulsa, Oklahoma
19:00 MST		Report		Stadium: ONEOK Field; Attendance: 4,866

July 5 16	Real Monarchs	3–1	OKC Energy	Sandy, Utah
19:00 MST	Hanlin 8' (yellow card) 82'; Haber (yellow card) 57'; Hoffman 70', 76' (pen.)	Report	Dixon 26'; Bond (yellow card) 55'; Andrews (red card) 74'	Stadium: Rio Tinto Stadium; Attendance: 2,065; Referee: Michael Radchuk

July 8 17	Real Monarchs	4–1	Seattle Sounders FC 2	Sandy, Utah
19:00 MST	Saucedo 31'; Hoffman 40'; Lachowecki 45+2'; Saucedo 73'	Report	Rothrock 77'	Stadium: Rio Tinto Stadium; Attendance: 1,637

July 22 18	San Antonio FC	2–2	Real Monarchs	San Antonio, Texas
19:00 MST	Vega 27'; McCarthy (yellow card) 52'; Tyrpak 68'	Report	Hoffman 32' (pen.); Gallagher (yellow card) 45+1'; Lachowecki (yellow card) 46' (goal) 86'	Stadium: Toyota Field; Attendance: 7,642; Referee: (United States) Rosendo Mendoza

July 26 19	Rio Grande Valley FC	1–2	Real Monarchs	Edinburg, Texas
19:00 MST	Escalante 58'; Ivan Magalhães (yellow card) 77'	Summary	Haber 8' (yellow card) 32'; Gallagher (yellow card) 37'; Besler (yellow card) 69'; Hoffman 78' (pen.)	Stadium: H-E-B Park; Attendance: 6,112; Referee: (United States) Mike Arrington

July 31 20	Real Monarchs	0–0	Tulsa Roughnecks	Sandy, Utah
9:00 P.M. CDT	Schuler (yellow card) 72'; Velásquez (yellow card) 77'	Report	Fernandez (yellow card) 89'	Stadium: Rio Tinto Stadium; Attendance: 2,420; Referee: B. Jensen

August 5 21	OKC Energy FC	2–0	Real Monarchs	Oklahoma City, Oklahoma
6:30 PM MDT	Dixon 26', 56', (yellow card) 31'; Dixon (yellow card) 52'	Report	Velasquez (yellow card) 58'	Stadium: Taft Stadium; Attendance: 4,087; Referee: Rosendo Mendoza

August 12 22	Real Monarchs	2–0	Colorado Springs Switchbacks	Salt Lake City, Utah
7:00 P.M. (MDT)	Hoffman 2'; Moberg 14', (yellow card) 21'; Curinga (yellow card) 21'; Minter (yellow card) 67', (yellow card) 71' (red card)	Report	McFarlane (yellow card) 21'; Frater (yellow card) 73'; Malcolm (yellow card) 77'; Kacher (penalty missed) 77'	Stadium: Rio Tinto Stadium; Attendance: 2,385; Referee: Joseph Dickerson

August 18 23	Swope Park Rangers	2–2	Real Monarchs	Kansas City, Missouri
19:30 (CDT)	Selbol 60'; Moloto (yellow card) 67'; Belmar 82'	Report	Haber 8'; Curinga 26' (yellow card) 88'	Stadium: Children's Mercy Victory Field; Attendance: 936; Referee: Malik Badawi

August 25 24	Real Monarchs	2–1	Rio Grande Valley FC	Salt Lake City, Utah
	Haber 18'; Velásquez 45'; Mare (yellow card) 90+2'	Report	Murphy 5'; Casner (yellow card) 22'	Stadium: Rio Tinto Stadium; Attendance: 2,202; Referee: Jon Freemon

September 2 25	Real Monarchs	1–2	San Antonio FC	Sandy, Utah
7:00 p.m. MDT	Curinga (yellow card) 8'; Saucedo 50', (yellow card) 68'	Report	Elizondo (yellow card) 50'; Tyrpak (yellow card) 58'; Ibeagha (yellow card) 86'; Peay 88' (o.g.); Pecka (yellow card) 90'; McCarthy 90+3'	Stadium: Rio Tinto Stadium; Attendance: 3,376; Referee: Ramy Touchan

September 9 26	Portland Timbers 2	0–0	Real Monarchs	Portland, Oregon
	Hanson (yellow card) 42'; Bjornethun (yellow card) 67'; Williams (yellow card) 71'	Report	Moberg (yellow card) 9'; Velásquez (yellow card) 63'	Stadium: Merlo Field; Attendance: 5,309; Referee: Ekaterina Koroleva

September 16 27	Phoenix Rising FC	2–0	Real Monarchs	Scottsdale, Arizona
7:30pm	Awako (yellow card) 4'; Hamilton 29'; Dia (yellow card) 54'; Johnson 73'; Cohen (yellow card) 90+2'	Report; Report	Cruz (yellow card) 90+3'	Stadium: Phoenix Rising FC Soccer Complex; Attendance: 6,008; Referee: Ismir Pekmic

September 22 28	Real Monarchs	0–0	Orange County SC	Sandy, Utah
7:00 PM MDT	Peay (yellow card) 23'; Cruz (yellow card) 45+2'	Report; Box Score	Alvarez (yellow card) 59'; Sorto (yellow card) 88'	Stadium: Rio Tinto Stadium; Attendance: 1,772; Referee: Victor Rivas

September 27 29	Sacramento Republic FC	0–2	Real Monarchs	Sacramento, California
8:30 P.M. PDT	Ochoa (yellow card) 50'		Putna (yellow card) 3'; Mare 47'; Hoffman 49'	Stadium: Papa Murphy's Park; Attendance: 11,569

September 30 30	Reno 1868 FC	0–3	Real Monarchs	Reno, Nevada
10:00 P.M. MDT	Hoppenot (penalty missed) 24'; Murrell (yellow card) 64'	Report	Brody (yellow card) 43'; Hoffman 47'; Velásquez (yellow card) 70'; Besler (yellow card) 77'; Mare 86'; Haber 89'	Stadium: Greater Nevada Field; Attendance: 6,598; Referee: Malik Badawi

== Statistics ==
As of July 3, 2017

Field Players
No.	Pos.	Name	USL		USL Cup		Total		Discipline	
No.	Pos.	Name	Apps	Goals	Apps	Goals	Apps	Goals	Yellow card	Red card
12	MF	(Jamaica) Omar Holness	2	1	0	0	2	1	0	0
29	MF	(Mexico) José Hernández	3	2	0	0	3	2	1	0
40	MF	(United States) James Moberg	14	2	0	0	14	2	2	0
41	MF	(England) Charlie Adams	11	1	0	0	11	1	1	1
42	MF	(Mexico) Jesús Leal	0	0	0	0	0	0	1	0
43	MF	(United States) Nick Besler	15	3	0	0	15	3	2	0
44	DF	(United States) Kyle Curinga	13	1	0	0	13	1	2	0
45	MF	(United States) Andrew Brody	15	2	0	0	15	2	0	0
46	FW	(Canada) Daniel Haber	15	3	0	0	15	3	1	0
47	DF	(United States) Max Lachowecki	15	0	0	0	15	0	1	0
48	MF	(United States) Chase Minter	9	0	0	0	9	0	1	0
49	FW	(United States) Chandler Hoffman	15	8	0	0	15	8	0	0
52	DF	(United States) Emilio Orozco	4	0	0	0	4	0	1	0
53	DF	(United States) Michael Gallagher	9	0	0	0	9	0	2	1
54	FW	(Ghana) Emmanuel Ocran	0	0	0	0	0	0	0	0
55	MF	(Colombia) Sebastián Velásquez	13	6	0	0	13	6	3	0
56	FW	(United States) Skyler Milne	0	0	0	0	0	0	0	0
57	MF	(United States) Karsten Hanlin	7	1	0	0	7	1	0	0
58	FW	(Haiti) Jonel Désiré	5	0	0	0	5	0	1	0
59	DF	(United States) Taylor Peay	8	2	0	0	8	2	1	0
60	DF	(United States) Riggs Lennon	0	0	0	0	0	0	0	0

Goal Keepers
No.	Pos.	Name	USL		USL Cup		Total		Discipline	
No.	Pos.	Name	Apps	Shutout	Apps	Shutout	Apps	Shutout	Yellow card	Red card
1	GK	(Mexico) Lalo Fernández	8	2	0	0	8	2	1	0
50	GK	(United States) Connor Sparrow	12	3	0	0	12	3	1	0
51	GK	(United States) Andrew Putna	1	0	0	0	1	0	0	0
99	GK	(United States) Jared Osgood	0	0	0	0	0	0	0	0

== See also ==
- 2017 Real Salt Lake season
