= 2016 Real Monarchs season =

Real Monarchs SLC
2016 season
- Owner: Dell Loy Hansen
- Head coach: Freddy Juarez
- Stadium: Rio Tinto Stadium
- Top goalscorer: Ricardo Velazco (6)
- Highest home attendance: 2,453 (Mar. 26 vs Saint Louis)
- Lowest home attendance: 200 (May 23 vs Orange County at Ute Soccer Field)
- Average home league attendance: 1,425

The 2016 Real Monarchs SLC season was the club's second season of existence, and second playing in the United Soccer League, the third tier of the American soccer pyramid. The season began on March 26 at home against Saint Louis FC, and ended on September 24.

== Players ==
As of March 24, 2016

No.	Position	Player	Nation
4	DF	USA	Riley McGovern
5	MF	BRA	Lennon Celestino
6	MF	USA	Alec Sundly
7	FW	GBS	Eti Tavares
9	FW	JAM	Kevaughn Frater (on loan from Harbour View)
10	MF	USA	Ricardo Velazco
11	MF	ESA	Maikon Orellana
12	DF	USA	Emilio Orozco
14	FW	USA	Colin Rolfe
15	DF	HON	Elder Torres (on loan from Vida)
16	FW	GHA	Amass Amankona
17	MF	USA	Andrew Brody
18	DF	USA	Max Lachowecki
19	MF	USA	Tyler Arnone
20	MF	USA	Edgar Duran
21	DF	ARG	Jonathan Caparelli
22	DF	USA	Darion Copeland
24	GK	USA	Eric Osswald
28	DF	USA	Chris Schuler
30	GK	USA	Connor Sparrow

== Competitions ==
=== Preseason ===
February 11, 2016 1	Santos de Guápiles (Costa Rica)	2-1	(United States) Real Monarchs SLC	Guápiles, Costa Rica
MDT		Report	Rolfe	Stadium: Estadio Ebal Rodríguez

February 15, 2016 2	A.D. Carmelita (Costa Rica)	0-3	(United States) Real Monarchs SLC	Costa Rica
MDT		Report

February 18, 2016 3	Generación Saprissa (Costa Rica)	1-1	(United States) Real Monarchs SLC	Costa Rica
MDT		Report

March 11, 2016 4	Real Monarchs SLC	1-2	BYU Cougars	Sandy, Utah
2:00pm MDT	Velazco (2nd half)	BYU Report	Botcherby (2nd half); Vasconcellos (2nd half)	Stadium: America First Field

March 19, 2016 5	Utah Valley Wolverines	1-5	Real Monarchs SLC	Orem, Utah
1:00pm MDT	17'	Report	Rolfe 37', 58'; Brody 39'; Amankona 45'; Duran 89'	Stadium: Clyde Field

=== USL Season ===
==== Matches ====
===== March =====
March 26, 2016 1	Real Monarchs SLC	1-0	Saint Louis FC	Sandy, Utah
7:00pm MDT	Orellana 90+'	Report	Musa (yellow card) 44'; Bond (yellow card) 90+'	Stadium: Rio Tinto Stadium; Attendance: 2,453; Referee: Tyler Ploeger

===== April =====
April 2, 2016 2	Real Monarchs SLC	3-3	LA Galaxy II	Sandy, Utah
7:00pm MDT	Arnone 14'; Copeland (yellow card) 22'; Orellana 25'; Rolfe 45'	Report	Neeskens (yellow card) 51'; Villarreal (yellow card) 68'; Zubak 81'; Fujii 88'; McBean 90' (pen.)	Stadium: Rio Tinto Stadium; Attendance: 1,639; Referee: Hamed Sadeghi

April 9, 2016 3	Tulsa Roughnecks	0-1	Real Monarchs SLC	Tulsa, Oklahoma
6:00pm MDT	Ochoa (red card) 59'; Davoren (yellow card) 90'	Report	Orellana 65'	Stadium: ONEOK Field; Attendance: 4,011; Referee: Sorin Stoica

April 15, 2016 4	Real Monarchs SLC	0-1	Arizona United	Orem, Utah
7:00pm MDT	Rolfe (yellow card) 24'; Amankona (yellow card) 48'; Copeland (yellow card) 76'; Frater (yellow card) 90+'	Report	Rooney (yellow card) 12'; Blackwood 72'	Stadium: Clyde Field; Attendance: - Referee: Mitch Lillywhite

April 23, 2016 5	Real Monarchs SLC	0-1	Rio Grande Valley FC	Sandy, Utah
7:00pm MDT	Copeland (yellow card) 28'; Frater (yellow card) 55'	Report	Escalante 24'; James (yellow card) 33'; K. Garcia (yellow card) 46'	Stadium: Rio Tinto Stadium; Attendance: 1,185; Referee: Daniel Radford

April 26, 2016 6	Real Monarchs SLC	0-0	Seattle Sounders FC 2	Sandy, Utah
7:00pm MDT		Report		Stadium: Rio Tinto Stadium; Attendance: 1,650; Referee: Andrew Musashe

===== May =====
May 7, 2016 7	Portland Timbers 2	3-1	Real Monarchs SLC	Portland, Oregon
6:00pm MDT	Polk 18'; Peay (yellow card) 48'; Brett 81', 90+'	Report	Celestino (yellow card) 68'; Brody 87'	Stadium: Providence Park; Attendance: 2,157; Referee: Victor Rivas

May 13, 2016 8	Rio Grande Valley FC	1-1	Real Monarchs SLC	Edinburg, Texas
6:30pm MDT	James (yellow card) 18'; Manotas 58'; Ward (yellow card) 69'	Report	Velazco 7' (pen.); Orozco (yellow card) 12'; Rolfe (yellow card) 45'; Sundly (yellow card) 46'; Acosta (yellow card) 52' (yellow-red card) 69'; Frater (yellow card) 83' (yellow-red card) 85'	Stadium: UTRGF Soccer Stadium; Attendance: 1,985

May 21, 2016 9	Real Monarchs SLC	3-1	Orange County Blues	Salt Lake City, Utah
7:00 pm MDT	Velazco 50', 69'; Okwuonu (yellow card) 56'; Sundly 59'; Holness (yellow card) 70'	Report	Stevanovic 6'; Popara (yellow card) 90'	Stadium: Ute Soccer Field; Attendance: 200; Referee: Younes Marrakchi

May 24, 2016 10	Oklahoma City Energy	3-1	Real Monarchs SLC	Oklahoma City, Oklahoma
6:00pm MDT	König 27'; Andrews 36'; Hyland 90+'	Report	Sandoval 21'; McGovern (yellow card) 63'	Stadium: Taft Stadium; Attendance: 4,219; Referee: Greg Dopka

May 29, 2016 11	Whitecaps FC 2	2-2	Real Monarchs SLC	Vancouver, British Columbia
3 PM MDT	Adekugbe (yellow card) 17'; McKendry 23'; Greig 24'; Flores (yellow card) 70'	Report	Frater (yellow card) 41'; Velazco 45+', 52', (yellow card) 58'	Stadium: Thunderbird Stadium; Attendance: - Referee: -

===== June =====
June 4, 2016 12	Whitecaps FC 2	0-1	Real Monarchs SLC	Vancouver, British Columbia
8 PM MDT	Levis (yellow card) 36'; Seymore (yellow card) 49'; Bustos (yellow card) 50'; Adekugbe (red card) 90+'	Report	Amankona 90+'	Stadium: Thunderbird Stadium; Attendance: - Referee: -

June 8, 2016 13	Sacramento Republic	1-0	Real Monarchs SLC	Sacramento, California
TBD MDT	Jahn 47'; Klimenta (yellow card) 48'; Kiffe (yellow card) 74'; Williams (yellow card) 85'; Motagalvan (yellow card) 88'	Report		Stadium: Bonney Field; Attendance: 10,745; Referee: Malik Badawi

June 11, 2016 14	Real Monarchs SLC	1-2	Sacramento Republic	Reno, Nevada
TBD MDT	Velazco 40'	Report	Iwasa 47'; Jahn 55'; Stewart (yellow card) 78'	Stadium: Greater Nevada Field; Attendance: 5,182; Referee: Victor Rivas

June 18, 2016 15	Orange County Blues	1-0	Real Monarchs SLC	Irvine, California
TBD MDT	Meeus 22'; Karapetyan (yellow card) 26'; Caesar (yellow card) 49'; Cortes (yellow card) 55'; Mirkovic (yellow card) 70'	Report	Sundly (yellow card) 34'; Frater (yellow card) 39'; Schuler (red card) 59'	Stadium: Anteater Stadium; Attendance: 750; Referee: Daniel Radford

June 26, 2016 16	Colorado Springs Switchbacks	0-1	Real Monarchs SLC	Colorado Springs, Colorado
130 pm MDT	Torres 24'; Orozco (yellow card) 26'; Arnone (yellow card) 72'; Frater (yellow card) 76'; Arnone (red card) 90+'	Report	Argueta (yellow card) 19'; Kim (yellow card) 41'; Ibeagha (red card) 69'	Stadium: Switchbacks Stadium; Attendance: unknown Referee: C. Delagadillo

June 29, 2016 17	Colorado Springs Switchbacks	1-0	Real Monarchs SLC	Colorado Springs, Colorado
7:00pm MDT	Burt 13', (yellow card) 67'; Gorrick (yellow card) 50'; Armstrong (yellow card) 75'; Kim (yellow card) 89'	Report	Sandoval (yellow card) 50'; Orozco (yellow card) 54'; Okwuonu (yellow card) 78'	Stadium: Switchbacks Stadium; Attendance: - Referee: A. Zarrin

===== July =====
July 2, 2016 18	Real Monarchs SLC	1-2	Whitecaps FC 2	Sandy, Utah
7:00 pm MDT	Arnone (yellow card) 42', (goal) 85'; Holness (yellow card) 55'	Report	Haber 18'; Flores (yellow card) 77'; Sanner (yellow card) 79'; Levis 90+'	Stadium: Rio Tinto Stadium; Attendance: 3,619; Referee: Tyler Ploeger

July 6, 2016 19	Sacramento Republic	2-3	Real Monarchs SLC	Sacramento, California
TBD MDT	da Fonte 53'; Barrera 57'; Colvey (yellow card) 59'	Report	Lachowecki (yellow card) 37'; Kavita (yellow card) 66'; Velazco 72', 90+'; Torres (yellow card) 79'; Frater 80'	Stadium: Bonney Field; Referee: Michael Zapata

July 22, 2016 20	Real Monarchs SLC	0–3	Arizona United	Orem, Utah
7:00 P.M. MDT	Schuler (yellow card) 45+'; Acosta (yellow card) 57'	Report; Report	Antúnez (yellow card) 21'; Rooney (yellow card) 24'; Cortez 49'; Blackwood 57'; Tan 86' (pen.)	Stadium: Clyde Field; Referee: Younes Marrakchi

===== August =====
August 1, 2016 21	Seattle Sounders FC 2	4–1	Real Monarchs SLC	Tukwila, Washington
TBD MDT	Samuel 33'; Jones 60'; Samuel 86'; Jones 90+2'	Report	Brody 22'	Stadium: Starfire Sports Complex; Attendance: 1,254; Referee: Chipalo Street

August 8, 2016 22	Real Monarchs SLC	0-0	Colorado Springs Switchbacks	Sandy, Utah
7:00 pm MDT				Stadium: Rio Tinto Stadium

August 13, 2016 23	Real Monarchs SLC	1-0	Swope Park Rangers	Sandy, Utah
7:00 pm MDT	Orozco 8'; Moberg (yellow card); Sundly (yellow card); Amankona (yellow card)	Summary	Ayrton (yellow card); Tyrpak (yellow card)	Stadium: Rio Tinto Stadium

August 17, 2016 24	Real Monarchs SLC	2–1	Portland Timbers 2	Sandy, Utah
7:00 pm MDT	Orellana 13'; Orozco (yellow card) 47'; Velazco (yellow card) 79'; Bijev 86' (o.g.)	Report	Bodily 70'	Stadium: Rio Tinto Stadium; Attendance: 2,016; Referee: Brad Jensen

August 27, 2016 25	Arizona United	0–1	Real Monarchs SLC	Peoria, Arizona
8:30pm MDT	Silva (red card) 52'	Report	Sundly (yellow card) 1'; Orellana 24'; Kavita (yellow card) 65'; Amankona (yellow card) 90+'; Ramírez (yellow card) 90+'	Stadium: Peoria Sports Complex; Attendance: 1,384; Referee: Robi Hullner

===== September =====
September 3, 2016 26	Real Monarchs SLC	1–1	Tulsa Roughnecks	Sandy, Utah
7:00pm MDT	Velazco 37'	Report	Mata 9'; Abidor (yellow card) 22'	Stadium: Rio Tinto Stadium; Attendance: 3,519

September 9, 2016 27	Real Monarchs SLC	0–2	Orange County Blues	Sandy, Utah
7:00 pm MDT	Orozco (red card) 11'	Report	Watson-Sirboe (yellow card) 34'; Pluntke (yellow card) 59'; Caesar 63'; Rauhofer 79'	Stadium: Rio Tinto Stadium; Attendance: 5,173

September 14, 2016 28	Real Monarchs SLC	2–0	San Antonio FC	Sandy, Utah
7:00 pm MDT	Lachowecki (yellow card) 43'; Adams 73'; Velazco (yellow card) 77'; Báez 82'; Okwuonu (yellow card) 86'	Report	Thurière (yellow card) 35'	Stadium: Rio Tinto Stadium; Attendance: 1,963; Referee: Brad Jensen

September 17, 2016 29	Arizona United	3–2	Real Monarchs SLC	Peoria, Arizona
8:30pm MDT	Rooney 13'; Kelly 64'; Tan 75'	Report; Report	Báez 45' (yellow card) 45+'; Ramírez 60'; Leal (yellow card) 85'	Stadium: Peoria Sports Complex; Attendance: 1,239; Referee: Paul Nothman

September 24, 2016 30	LA Galaxy II	3–1	Real Monarchs SLC	Carson, California
TBD MDT	Lassiter 18'; Mendiola 66'; Amaya 71'	Report	Velazco 29'	Stadium: StubHub Center; Attendance: 1,686; Referee: Ramy Touchan

==== Results summary ====
Overall								Home						Away					
Pld	Pts	W	L	T	GF	GA	GD	W	L	T	GF	GA	GD	W	L	T	GF	GA	GD
14	16	4	6	4	15	18	−3	2	3	2	8	8	0	2	3	2	7	10	−3

Last updated: April 2, 2016
Pld = Matches played; Pts = Points; W = Matches won; T = Matches tied; L = Matches lost; GF = Goals for; GA = Goals against; GD = Goal difference

==== Standings ====
Pos	Team	Pld	W	D	L	GF	GA	GD	Pts
9	Portland Timbers 2	30	12	4	14	38	42	−4	40
10	San Antonio FC	30	10	8	12	36	36	0	38
11	Real Monarchs	30	10	6	14	31	41	−10	36
12	Seattle Sounders 2	30	9	8	13	35	50	−15	35
13	Arizona United	30	9	7	14	40	46	−6	34

Source: 2016 USL Standings
Rules for classification: 1) total wins; 2) total goal differential; 3) total goals scored; 4) points earned against top four Conference finishers; 5) disciplinary points; 6) coin toss or drawing of lots

== Stats ==
- Stats from USL regular season. Players in italics loaned from parent club Real Salt Lake.

As of June 14, 2016

Goals
Rank	Player	Nation	Goals
1	Ricardo Velazco	(United States)	6
2	Maikon Orellana	(El Salvador)	3
3	Amass Amankona	(Ghana)	1
3	Tyler Arnone	(United States)	1
3	Andrew Brody	(United States)	1
3	Colin Rolfe	(United States)	1
3	Devon Sandoval	(United States)	1
3	Alec Sundly	(United States)	1

Assists
Rank	Player	Nation	Assists
1	Ricardo Velazco	(United States)	3
2	Amass Amankona	(Ghana)	1
2	Kevaughn Frater	(Jamaica)	1
2	Maikon Orellana	(El Salvador)	1
2	Devon Sandoval	(United States)	1
2	Elder Torres	(Honduras)	1

Shutouts
Rank	Player	Nation	Shutouts
1	Lalo Fernández	(Mexico)	3
2	Jeff Attinella	(United States)	1
