= 2018 Real Monarchs season =

Real Monarchs
2018 season
- Head Coach: Mark Briggs
- Stadium: Zions Bank Stadium; Herriman, Utah
- USL: Conference: 4th

The 2018 Real Monarchs season is the fourth season for Real Monarchs in the United Soccer League (USL), the second-tier professional soccer league in the United States and Canada.

== Club ==
No.	Position	Player	Nation
3	DF	WAL	Adam Henley
4	DF	USA	David Horst
13	MF	USA	Nick Besler
19	MF	ENG	Luke Mulholland
21	DF	USA	Taylor Peay
25	DF	USA	Danny Acosta
28	FW	USA	Ricky Lopez-Espin
29	MF	MEX	José Hernández
30	DF	URU	Marcelo Silva
31	MF	ARG	Pablo Ruíz
40	MF	USA	James Moberg
41	MF	ENG	Charlie Adams
42	DF	COL	David Diosa
43	MF	USA	Justin Portillo
44	MF	CUB	Maikel Chang
45	MF	USA	Andrew Brody
46	MF	CAN	Masta Kacher
47	FW	CAN	Josh Heard
48	DF	USA	Rhys Williams
49	FW	USA	Chandler Hoffman
50	GK	USA	Jake Leeker
51	GK	USA	Andrew Putna
52	DF	USA	Kalen Ryden
53	DF	USA	Michael Gallagher
54	FW	ARG	Juan Mare
55	MF	COL	Sebastián Velásquez
56	DF	POL	Konrad Plewa
57	MF	SCO	Jack Blake (on loan from Tampa Bay Rowdies)
58	GK	CRC	Dan Jackson
—	MF	GRN	Jamal Charles (on loan from Vida)
—	DF	KEN	Joseph Okumu

Signed to first team contract with Real Salt Lake.
Real Salt Lake Academy player.

== Competitions ==
=== Pre-season ===
March 3	Sacramento State University	0–4	Real Monarchs	Sacramento, California
		Report		Stadium: Hornet Soccer Field

March 7	Reno 1868 FC	1–0	Real Monarchs	Reno, Nevada
7:00 PM		Report		Stadium: Greater Nevada Field

March 10	Fresno FC	3–2	Real Monarchs	Davis, California
4:00 P.M.	Johnson 40'; Bustamante 77'; Campbell 89'	Report	Heard; Hoffman 53'	Stadium: Aggie Soccer Field; Attendance: Closed-door

March 16	Real Monarchs	1–0	Utah Valley University	Herriman, Utah
				Stadium: Zions Bank Stadium

=== United Soccer League ===
==== Standings ====
Pos	Team	Pld	W	D	L	GF	GA	GD	Pts	Qualification
2	Sacramento Republic	34	19	8	7	47	32	+15	65	Conference Playoffs
3	Phoenix Rising FC	34	19	6	9	63	38	+25	63	Conference Playoffs
4	Real Monarchs	34	19	3	12	55	47	+8	60	Conference Playoffs
5	Reno 1868 FC	34	16	11	7	56	38	+18	59	Conference Playoffs
6	Portland Timbers 2	34	17	4	13	58	49	+9	55	Conference Playoffs

Source: 2018 USL standings
Rules for classification: 1) total wins; 2) total goal differential; 3) total goals scored; 4) points earned against top four Conference finishers; 5) disciplinary points; 6) coin toss or drawing of lots

==== Match results ====
Win Draw Loss Upcoming fixture

Unless otherwise noted, all times in MDT (UTC-06)

March 24 1	Tulsa Roughnecks	2–3	Real Monarchs	Tulsa, Oklahoma
1:00 P.M.	Pírez (yellow card) 46'; Rivas 61', 83'; Mirković (yellow card) 65'; Lennon (yellow card) 69'; Gee (yellow card) 76'	Report	Baird 7', (yellow card) 48'; Hoffman 89'; Adams 90+1'	Stadium: ONEOK Field; Attendance: 5,203; Referee: Michael Cap

March 31 2	Real Monarchs	2–4	Portland Timbers 2	Sandy, Utah
1:00 P.M.	Jadama (yellow card) 31'; Ebobisse 35'; Arboleda 59'	Report	Besler 3'; Ryden 7' 32'; Gallagher (yellow card) 54'; Velásquez 66'	Stadium: Rio Tinto Stadium; Attendance: 2,514; Referee: Brad Jensen

April 7 3	Phoenix Rising FC	0–1	Real Monarchs	Scottsdale, Arizona
8:30 P.M.	Lambert (yellow card) 28'; Fernandez (yellow card) 50'; Drogba (yellow card) 90+3'	Report	Velásquez 56'; Heard (yellow card) 58'; Brody (yellow card) 65'; Ryden (yellow card) 71'; Portillo (yellow card) 78'; Chang (yellow card) 90+5'	Stadium: Phoenix Rising FC Soccer Complex; Attendance: 6,531; Referee: Ramy Touchan

April 11 4	Seattle Sounders FC 2	1–3	Real Monarchs	Tacoma, Washington
8:00 P.M.	Estrada 19'; Felix Chenkam (yellow card) 90+2'	Report	Kacher 4', 65'; Adams (yellow card) 49'; Hoffman 77'; Velasquez (yellow card) 88'	Stadium: Cheney Stadium; Attendance: 2,090; Referee: Alan Kelly

April 21 5	Tampa Bay Rowdies	2–0	Real Monarchs	St. Petersburg, Florida
5:30 P.M.	Gorskie (yellow card) 35'; Cole 40', (yellow card) 51'; Hristov 70' (Cole)	Report	Ryden (yellow card) 45'; Portillo (yellow card) 59'	Stadium: Al Lang Stadium; Attendance: 6,027; Referee: Daniel Gutierrez

April 30 6	Real Monarchs	0–0	Las Vegas Lights FC	Herriman, Utah
7:00 P.M.	Velásquez (yellow card) 68'	Report	Alatorre (red card) 18'; Kobayashi (yellow card) 56'; Ferriño (yellow card) 90'; Alvarez (yellow card) 90+2'	Stadium: Zions Bank Stadium; Attendance: 4,065; Referee: Jon Freemon

May 4 7	Real Monarchs	2–1	Orange County SC	Herriman, Utah
7:00 P.M.	Chang 6'; Adams (yellow card) 26', (yellow card) 82' (red card); Mare 90+1', (yellow card) 90+1'; Sparrow (yellow card) 90+4'	Report	Quinn (yellow card) 38', (goal) 45+1' (pen.); Amico (yellow card) 89'	Stadium: Zions Bank Stadium; Attendance: 1,644; Referee: Lukasz Szpala

May 9 8	Real Monarchs	4–1	Swope Park Rangers	Herriman, Utah
7:00 P.M.	Mare (yellow card) 15' (goal) 55'; Ryden 24', 44'; Evans (o.g.)	Report	Belmar 8'	Stadium: Zions Bank Stadium; Attendance: 1,089; Referee: Elijio Arreguin

May 12 9	Real Monarchs	1–0	Fresno FC	Herriman, Utah
2:00 P.M.	Chang 8'	Report	Barrera (yellow card) 31'; Cazarez (yellow card) 79'	Stadium: Zions Bank Stadium; Attendance: 1,245; Referee: Sergii Demianchuk

May 19 10	Las Vegas Lights FC	0–2	Real Monarchs	Las Vegas, Nevada
8:00 pm PDT	Drake (yellow card) 34'; Alvarez (yellow card) 66'; Huiqui (yellow card) 90+5'	Report	Velásquez 3'; Adams (yellow card) 16'; Heard 22'; Horst (yellow card) 59'	Stadium: Cashman Field; Attendance: 6,810; Referee: Malik Badawi

May 26 11	Portland Timbers 2	1–0	Real Monarchs	Portland, Oregon
3:00 P.M.	Asprilla (yellow card) 36' (goal) 77'; Vytas (yellow card) 50'	Report	Peay (yellow card) 56'	Stadium: Providence Park; Attendance: 1,548; Referee: Rosendo Mendoza

May 29 12	Real Monarchs	1–0	Sacramento Republic FC	Herriman, Utah
8:00 P.M.	Portillo (yellow card) 33'; Hoffman 68'	Report		Stadium: Zions Bank Stadium; Attendance: 1,137; Referee: Daniel Radford

June 4 13	Real Monarchs	2–0	Rio Grande Valley FC Toros	Herriman, Utah
6:00 P.M.	Ledezma 25'; Moberg (yellow card) 45'; Kacher (yellow card) 48', (goal) 70'	Report	Enríquez (yellow card) 31'; James (yellow card) 49'; Sullivan (yellow card) 79'	Stadium: Zions Bank Stadium; Attendance: 1,654

June 13 14	Swope Park Rangers	3–2	Real Monarchs	Kansas City, Kansas
6:30 P.M.	Storm 22'; Minter (yellow card) 29'; Silva (yellow card) 44' (goal) 57'; Blackwood 79'	Report	Hoffman 19' (pen.), 83'; Ruíz (yellow card) 45'	Stadium: Children's Mercy Park; Attendance: 985; Referee: Jon Freemon

June 16 15	Saint Louis FC	0–1	Real Monarchs	Fenton, Missouri
6:30 P.M.	Kavita (yellow card) 59'	Report	Hoffman 15' (pen.); Horst (yellow card) 25'; Heard (yellow card) 42'	Stadium: Toyota Stadium; Attendance: 5,432; Referee: Daniel Gutierrez

June 26 16	Real Monarchs	1–0	Fresno FC	Herriman, Utah
7:00 P.M.	Brody 8'; Blake (yellow card) 87'	Report	Brown (yellow card) 30'; Johnson (yellow card) 65' (yellow-red card) 69'	Stadium: Zions Bank Stadium; Attendance: 1,812; Referee: Joseph Dickerson

July 3 17	Reno 1868 FC	3–0	Real Monarchs	Reno, Nevada
8:00 P.M.	Carroll (yellow card) 24'; Felipe Fernandes 32', (yellow card) 84'; Brown 57', 66'; Hoppenot (yellow card) 74'	Report	Moberg (yellow card) 74'; Blake (yellow card) 83'	Stadium: Greater Nevada Field; Attendance: 5,125; Referee: Michael Radchuk

July 7 18	Sacramento Republic FC	0–0	Real Monarchs	Sacramento, California
9:00 P.M.	Moffat (yellow card) 50'	Report	Velásquez (yellow card) 66'; Moberg (yellow card) 73'; Gallagher (yellow card) 78'	Stadium: Papa Murphy's Park; Attendance: 11,569; Referee: Mark Allatin

July 14 19	Real Monarchs	2–0	Seattle Sounders FC 2	Herriman, Utah
8:00 P.M.	Adams (yellow card) 17', (goal) 26'; Velasquez 70'; Kacher (yellow card) 73'; Chang (yellow card) 84'	Report	Daley (yellow card) 54'; Burke-Gilroy (yellow card) 80'	Stadium: Zions Bank Stadium; Attendance: 835; Referee: Farhad Dadkho

July 21 20	San Antonio FC	4–2	Real Monarchs	San Antonio, Texas
6:30 P.M.	Gallagher 1' (o.g.); Gordon 27'; King (yellow card) 50'; Guzmán 56'; Ward 68'	Report	Velásquez 16', 61'; Blake (yellow card) 65'; Moberg (yellow card) 67'	Stadium: Toyota Field; Attendance: 6,572; Referee: Victor Rivas

July 28 21	Real Monarchs	4–1	Phoenix Rising FC	Herriman, Utah
7:00 P.M.	Velásquez 37' da Fonte 43' (o.g.); Heard (yellow card) 45'; Henley (yellow card) 60'; Chang (yellow card) 61'; Hoffman 65'; Portillo (yellow card) 77'; Brody 84'	Report	Awako (red card) 62'; Ryden 76' (o.g.) da Fonte (yellow card) 78'; Woszczynski (yellow card) 85'	Stadium: Zions Bank Stadium; Attendance: 1,743; Referee: Lukasz Szpala

August 8 22	Real Monarchs	2–1	Reno 1868 FC	Herriman, Utah
8:00 P.M.	Adams 10'; Ryden (yellow card) 31'; Chang 41'; Hernández (yellow card) 81'	Report	Brown 9'; Van Ewijk (yellow card) 71'	Stadium: Zions Bank Stadium; Referee: Kevin Broadley

August 11 23	OKC Energy	3–2	Real Monarchs	Oklahoma City, OK
7:30 PM CDT	Volesky 1'; A.Dixon 27'; Barril (yellow card) 62'; Patterson 83'	Report	Adams 58'; Blake 60'; Mare (yellow card) 90+1'	Stadium: Taft Stadium; Attendance: 5,616; Referee: Elijio Arreguin

August 18 24	Real Monarchs	3–2	Tulsa Roughnecks	Herriman, Utah
8:00 P.M.	Hoffman 12', 35'; Plewa (yellow card) 69'; Portillo 86' (pen.); Mare (yellow card) 90+2'	Report	Covarrubius (yellow card) 44'; Ferreira 55' del Grecco (yellow card) 56'; Tavares 83'; Cerda (yellow card) 85'	Stadium: Zions Bank Stadium; Attendance: 1,404; Referee: Elton García

August 25 25	Real Monarchs	4–0	LA Galaxy II	Herriman, Utah
7:00 P.M.	Chang 20'; Adams 33', (yellow card) 65'; Hoffman 36', 40'	Report	Vera (yellow card) 85'	Stadium: Zions Bank Stadium; Attendance: 1,707; Referee: Jose Lara

August 29 26	Colorado Springs Switchbacks FC	1–0	Real Monarchs	Colorado Springs, Colorado
7:00 P.M. (MDT)	Robinson 87'	Report	Mare (yellow card) 44'; Gallagher (yellow card) 78'	Stadium: Weidner Field; Attendance: 3,248; Referee: Joe Wykowsk

September 3 27	Real Monarchs	1–2	San Antonio FC	Herriman, Utah
8:00 p.m. CDT	Williams (yellow card) 40'; Plewa 64'	Report	Guzmán 31'; Seth (yellow card) 63'; Laing 66'	Stadium: Zions Bank Stadium; Referee: Marcos de Oliveira

September 5 28	Rio Grande Valley Toros	2–1	Real Monarchs	Edinburg, Texas
6:30 P.M.	Padilla (yellow card) 45'; Quintailla 71'; Wharton 77'	Report	Plewa 26'; Portillo (yellow card) 76'	Stadium: H-E-B Park; Attendance: 3,058; Referee: Luis Guardia

September 12 29	Real Monarchs	1–1	Saint Louis FC	Herriman, Utah
8:00 P.M.	Plewa (yellow card) 6'; Hernández 48'	Report	Fall 9'; Calistri (yellow card) 32'; Hilton (yellow card) 81'	Stadium: Zions Bank Stadium; Attendance: 1,180; Referee: Joseph Dickerson

September 19 30	Orange County SC	5–2	Real Monarchs	Irvine, California
8:00 P.M.	Crognale (yellow card) 22'; Quinn 36', 80' (pen.); Powder 37'; Duke 77'; Amico (yellow card) 81'; Enevoldsen 88'	Report	Portillo (yellow card) 1', (goal) 63'; Ryden 7', (yellow card) 79'; Chang (yellow card) 82'	Stadium: Championship Soccer Stadium; Attendance: 2,238; Referee: Mark Allatin

September 22 31	LA Galaxy II	6–1	Real Monarchs	Carson, California
19:30	Zubak 18'; Vera 38'; Alvarez 49', 52', 75'; Engola (yellow card) 76'; López 86'	Report	Plewa (yellow card) 56'; Hoffman 57'; Chang (yellow card) 68'	Stadium: StubHub Center; Attendance: 1,008; Referee: Victor Rivas

September 29 32	Real Monarchs	0–2	Colorado Springs Switchbacks FC	Herriman, Utah
7:00 P.M. (MDT)	Kacher (yellow card) 53'; Ryden (yellow card) 90'	Report	Ajeakwa 63'; Maybin 90+1'	Stadium: Zions Bank Stadium; Attendance: 2,386; Referee: Elijio Arreguin

October 3 33	Real Monarchs	2–1	OKC Energy	Herriman, Utah
7:00 P.M. (MDT)	Saucedo 17', 48'; Sparrow (yellow card) 21'	Report	R. Dixon 22' (pen.); Ross (yellow card) 75'	Stadium: Zions Bank Stadium; Attendance: 1,170; Referee: Alejandro Mariscal

October 13 34	Fresno FC	0–1	Real Monarchs	Fresno, California
8:00 P.M.	Caffa (yellow card) 77'; Del Campo (yellow card) 82'	Report	Adams 37'; Okumu (yellow card) 86'	Stadium: Chukchansi Park; Referee: Michael Radchuk

==== Postseason ====
Win Draw Loss Upcoming fixture

October 20 Quarterfinal	Real Monarchs	0–1	Reno 1868 FC	Herriman, Utah
15:00 (MST)	Velásquez (yellow card) 45+4'	Report	Brown 90+2'	Stadium: Zions Bank Stadium; Attendance: 3,000; Referee: Ismir Pekmic
