= 2023 San Diego Loyal SC season =

San Diego Loyal SC
2023 season
- Owner: Andrew Vassilanis
- Manager: Nate Miller
- USL Championship: Western Conference: 3rd League Standings: 6th
- USLC Playoffs: Western Conference Quarterfinals
- U.S. Open Cup: Third Round
- Top goalscorer: League: Ronaldo Damus (15); All: Ronaldo Damus (15)
- Highest home attendance: 5,671 (3 times)
- Lowest home attendance: 3,214 (August 9, against Loudoun United FC)
- Average home league attendance: 4,754
- Biggest win: 5-0 (July 14, against Colorado Springs Switchbacks FC)
- Biggest defeat: 0-2 (Twice, against Oakland Roots SC and Charleston Battery)
Home colors	Away colors	Third colors

The 2023 San Diego Loyal SC season was San Diego Loyal SC's fourth, and last, season of existence and their fourth season in the USL Championship (USLC), the second division in the American soccer system.

After the announcement of a new MLS expansion franchise, called San Diego FC, the club announced they would cease operations at the end of the season, citing stadium struggles. With supporter groups running with the catchphrase, "Bury Us With The Cup", the Loyal would qualify for the USL Playoffs as the 3rd seed in the Western Conference, and played in what would end up being their final match in the Western Conference Quarterfinals on October 22 at Torero Stadium, in a 4–3 loss in extra time to Phoenix Rising FC.

== Season summary ==
During the offseason, the Loyal experienced a coaching change when coach Landon Donovan made the move to the front office. He was later replaced by Nate Miller.

As a member of the USL Championship, the San Diego Loyal entered the U.S. Open Cup in the second round on April 5, matched up against third division club Albion San Diego, a member of the National Independent Soccer Association. After winning 2–0 at home, the Loyal would be matched up against the Seattle Sounders FC, a member of Major League Soccer, the highest division in soccer. After forcing added extra time away in Washington with a stoppage time goal by defender Kyle Adams, the Loyal would eventually lose 5-4 via a stoppage time penalty kick goal by Sounders' forward Fredy Montero.

On August 24, 2023, owner Andrew Vassilanis released a statement that he would shut down the team, and the USL announced that it would transfer the franchise rights of the Loyal due to an inability to find a "viable near- and long-term stadium solution", with the 2023 season set to be the club's last. The team had searched for a venue to replace Torero Stadium but were unable to find suitable facilities in San Diego County; a plan to relocate to Santa Barbara was also considered, but negotiations failed to produce a solution. The announcement came three months after Major League Soccer's newest expansion franchise, San Diego FC, was announced.

The Loyal qualified for the USLC Playoffs with a 16-9-9 record, securing home advantage for the first round of the playoffs on October 8. Despite winning home advantage, they played their final match in the Western Conference Quarterfinals on October 22 at Torero Stadium in a 4–3 extra time loss to Phoenix Rising FC, who would eventually win the 2024 USL Championship Playoffs.

== Roster ==
As of July 25, 2024

Note: Flags indicate national team as defined under FIFA eligibility rules; some limited exceptions apply. Players may hold more than one non-FIFA nationality.

No.	Pos.	Nation	Player
1	GK	(Spain) ESP	Koke Vegas
2	FW	(United States) USA	Morgan Hackworth
3	DF	(United States) USA	Elijah Martin
4	DF	(Mexico) MEX	Carlos Guzmán
5	DF	(United States) USA	Grant Stoneman
6	MF	(England) ENG	Charlie Adams
7	MF	(United States) USA	Blake Bodily
8	FW	(Haiti) HAI	Ronaldo Damus
9	FW	(United States) USA	Evan Conway
10	MF	(United States) USA	Alejandro Guido
11	FW	(South Africa) RSA	Tumi Moshobane
13	DF	(United States) USA	Camden Riley
14	FW	(United States) USA	Adrien Pérez

No.	Pos.	Nation	Player
15	MF	(United States) USA	Joe Corona
16	DF	(Tanzania) TAN	Jackson Kasanzu
17	MF	(United States) USA	Collin Martin
18	FW	(New Zealand) NZL	Elliot Collier
20	MF	(United States) USA	Nick Moon
21	DF	(Ghana) GHA	Ebenezer Ackon
23	DF	(Israel) ISR	Michael Chilaka
30	MF	(United States) USA	Simon Sagal
50	MF	(United States) USA	Xavi Gnaulati
60	GK	(United States) USA	Duran Ferree
61	MF	(United States) USA	Isaiahs Gutierrez
63	GK	(Mexico) MEX	Christian Velasco
70	MF	(United States) USA	Jake Basinet

== Competitions ==
=== USL Championship ===
==== Regular season ====
===== Standings =====
Pos	Team	Pld	W	L	T	GF	GA	GD	Pts	Qualification
1	Sacramento Republic FC	34	18	6	10	51	26	+25	64	Playoffs
2	Orange County SC	34	17	11	6	46	39	+7	57	Playoffs
3	San Diego Loyal SC	34	16	9	9	61	43	+18	57	Playoffs
4	San Antonio FC	34	14	6	14	63	38	+25	56	Playoffs
5	Colorado Springs Switchbacks FC	34	16	13	5	49	42	+7	53	Playoffs

Source: USL Championship Standings
Rules for classification: 1) head-to-head points; 2) head-to-head goal differential; 3) points-per game within conference; 4) total wins; 5) total goal differential; 6) total goals scored; 7) points earned against top four Conference finishers; 8) disciplinary points; 9) coin toss or drawing of lots

===== Results summary =====
Overall								Home						Away					
Pld	W	D	L	GF	GA	GD	Pts	W	D	L	GF	GA	GD	W	D	L	GF	GA	GD
34	16	9	9	61	43	+18	57	9	4	4	32	20	+12	7	5	5	29	23	+6

===== Match results =====
On January 9, 2023, the USL Championship staff released the schedule for all 24 teams.

All times are in Pacific Time.

====== March ======
March 11 1	San Diego Loyal SC	1–0	Detroit City FC	San Diego, California
8:00 PM	Conway (yellow card) 28'; Kasanzu 42'; Ackon (yellow card) 66'	Report	Carroll (yellow card) 54'; Matthews (yellow card) 59'	Stadium: Torero Stadium; Attendance: 5,671; Referee: Ricardo Fierro

March 19 2	San Diego Loyal SC	3–0	Phoenix Rising FC	San Diego, California
3:00 PM	Moon (yellow card) 37'; Conway 44'; Damus 74'; Collier (yellow card) 82'; Riley (yellow card) 84'; Bodily 90'	Report	Varela (yellow card) 12'; Zambrano (yellow card) 53'; King (yellow card) 80'	Stadium: Torero Stadium; Attendance: 5,114; Referee: Matthew Corrigan

March 25 3	Sacramento Republic FC	1-0	San Diego Loyal	Sacramento, California
7:00 PM	Fernandes 41'; Cicerone (yellow card) 61'; Lopez (yellow card) 67'; Donovan (yellow card) 80'	Report	Martin (yellow card) 26'; Kasanze (yellow card) 34'; Bodily (yellow card) 40'; Collier (yellow card) 69'; Guido (yellow card) 75'	Stadium: Heart Health Park; Attendance: 9,088; Referee: Malik Badawi

====== April ======
April 1 4	Phoenix Rising FC	2–2	San Diego Loyal SC	Phoenix, Arizona
7:30 PM	Arteaga (yellow card) 3' (goal) 35', 63'; Cuello (yellow card) 44'; Krutzen (yellow card) 45+2'; Harvey (yellow card) 82'; Fuenmayor (yellow card) 90+1'	Report	Moon 72'; Damus 80'; Martin (yellow card) 83'	Stadium: Phoenix Rising Soccer Stadium; Attendance: 10,437; Referee: Elton Garcia

April 8 5	San Diego Loyal	2-1	FC Tulsa	San Diego, California
2:00 PM	Conway 63'; Fernandez 90+4' (o.g.)	Report	Dyer (yellow card) 60'; Corrales (yellow card) 62' da Costa 65'	Stadium: Torero Stadium; Attendance: 4,412; Referee: Corbyn May

April 15 6	New Mexico United	1-1	San Diego Loyal SC	Albuquerque, New Mexico
6:00 PM	Hamilton 9'; Moreno (yellow card) 29'; Swartz (yellow card) 33'; Rivas (yellow card) 45'+1'; Yearwood (yellow card) 57'	Report	Martin (yellow card) 11'; Conway 45'+1'; Damus (yellow card) 68'; Stoneman (yellow card) 90'+5'	Stadium: Isotopes Park; Attendance: 11,233; Referee: Eric Tattersall

April 23 7	San Diego Loyal	1-0	Tampa Bay Rowdies	San Diego, California
3:00 PM	Perez 42'	Report	Dennis (yellow card) 89'	Stadium: Torero Stadium; Attendance: 4,814; Referee: Alexis Da Silva

April 29 8	San Diego Loyal SC	1–2	El Paso Locomotive FC	San Diego, California
7:00 PM	Corona (yellow card) 7'; Guido (yellow card) 45'; Perez (yellow card) 60'; Moshobane 61'	Report	Calvillo (yellow card) 9'; Zacarías 13'; Clarhaut (yellow card) 23'; Pávkovics (yellow card) 56'; Kostyshyn 65'; Borelli (yellow card) 82'; Lyons (yellow card) 88'; Herrera (yellow card) 90+6'	Stadium: Torero Stadium; Attendance: 4,414; Referee: Katja Koroleva

====== May ======
May 6 9	Orange County SC	1-2	San Diego Loyal	Irvine, California
7:00 PM	Villanueva (yellow card) 18'; Iloski (yellow card) 59'; Richards (yellow card) 59'; Partida (yellow card) 60'; Doghman (yellow card) 80'; McNulty (yellow card) 86'; Powers (yellow card) 86'; Casiple (yellow card) 89'; Osundina 90'+6'	Report	Moshobane 15'; Corona 19' (pen.) (yellow card) 49'; Moon (yellow card) 59' (yellow-red card) 90'+5'; Riley (yellow card) 81'	Stadium: Championship Soccer Stadium; Attendance: 4,616; Referee: Elijio Arreguin

May 13 10	San Diego Loyal SC	2–3	Rio Grande Valley FC	San Diego, California
7:00 PM	Perez 35'; Adams (yellow card) 61'; Corona 90+3' (pen.)	Report	Ricketts (yellow card) 19'; Coronado 26'; François 31'; Ruiz 39'; Davila (yellow card) 90+5'	Stadium: Torero Stadium; Attendance: 5,671; Referee: Brandon Stevis

May 20 11	Miami FC	2–3	San Diego Loyal SC	Miami, Florida
4:00 PM	Craig (yellow card) 10'; Stoneman 16' (o.g.); Salazar (yellow card) 20'; Murphy (yellow card) 45', (goal) 61'; Segbers (yellow card) 90+2'	Report	Conway 40'; Guido (yellow card) 54'; Corona (yellow card) 61'; Craig 81' (o.g.); Collier 85'	Stadium: Riccardo Silva Stadium; Attendance: 1,538; Referee: Melvin Rivas

May 27 12	Oakland Roots SC	2–0	San Diego Loyal SC	Hayward, California
7:00 PM	Rodriguez 7' (yellow card) 20'; Hackshaw (yellow card) 35'; Klimenta (yellow card) 64'; Peláez 90'+5'	Report		Stadium: Pioneer Stadium; Attendance: 3,584; Referee: Calin Radosav

====== June ======
June 3 13	San Antonio FC	3–3	San Diego Loyal SC	San Antonio, Texas
7:00 PM	Oluwaseyi 3', (yellow card) 12' (yellow-red card) 20'; Zouhir 5', (yellow card) 39'; Taintor 16', (yellow card) 70'; Abu (yellow card) 85'; Hayes (yellow card) 90+2'	Report	Moon (yellow card) 22' (yellow-red card) 90+6'; Stoneman (yellow card) 45+1'; Damus 75', 90+5'; Conway 79'	Stadium: Toyota Field; Attendance: 7,043; Referee: Thomas Snyder
Note: 225th USL league match

June 9 14	San Diego Loyal SC	1-1	Sacramento Republic FC	San Diego, California
7:00 PM	Damus 69' (pen.); Guido (yellow card) 79'; Adams (yellow card) 90'+4'	Report	Viader 29'; López (yellow card) 39'; Donovan (yellow card) 67'; Keko (yellow card) 90'+2'	Stadium: Torero Stadium; Attendance: 5,082; Referee: Corbyn May

June 14 15	San Diego Loyal SC	2–2	San Antonio FC	San Diego, California
7:00 PM	Guido 10'; Miller (yellow card) 54'; Riley (yellow card) 66'; Pérez 73'; Moshobane (yellow card) 74'	Report	Taintor (yellow card) 45'; Adeniran 47' (pen.); Manley 67'; Batista (yellow card) 83'; Marcina (yellow card) 88'	Stadium: Torero Stadium; Attendance: 4,217; Referee: Ricardo Fierro

June 24 16	Pittsburgh Riverhounds SC	2–1	San Diego Loyal SC	Pittsburgh, Pennsylvania
4:00 PM	Showunmi 68'; Griffin (yellow card) 75'; Osumanu 90'+1'	Report	Riley (yellow card) 13'; Perez 42'; Martin (yellow card) 64'; Adams (yellow card) 90'	Stadium: Highmark Stadium; Attendance: 6,107; Referee: Nabil Bensalah

====== July ======
July 1 17	Indy Eleven	2–2	San Diego Loyal SC	Indianapolis, Indiana
3:55 PM	Dambrot (yellow card) 7'; King (yellow card) 14'; Diz Pe (yellow card) 57'; Rissi (red card) 58'; Quinn 66' 82' (pen.); Lindley (yellow card) 90'+12'	Report	Adams 32'; Perez (yellow card) 39'; Conway 54'; Damus (yellow card) 74'; Martin (yellow card) 89'	Stadium: Michael A. Carroll Stadium; Attendance: 9,082; Referee: Matthew Corrigan

July 8 18	Hartford Athletic	0-2	San Diego Loyal	Hartford, Connecticut
4:00 PM	Edwards (yellow card) 67'; Lapert (yellow card) 84'	Report	Perez (yellow card) 12'; Conway 18'; Martin (yellow card) 26'; Conway (yellow card) 28'; Conway 61'; Riley (yellow card) 90+3'	Stadium: Trinity Health Stadium; Attendance: 5500; Referee: Alexis Da Silva

July 14 19	Colorado Springs Switchbacks FC	0-5	San Diego Loyal	Colorado Springs, Colorado
6:00 PM	Williams (red card) 15'; Beckford (yellow card) 20'; Mahoney (yellow card) 21'; Echevarria (yellow card) 88'; Wheeler (yellow card) 90'+1'	Report	Perez 1'; Bodily 9', 30'; Stoneman (yellow card) 18'; Martin (yellow card) 40'; Conway (yellow card) 41'; Moshobane 45'+3'; Riley (yellow card) 67'; Collier 70'; Corona (yellow card) 79'	Stadium: Weidner Field; Attendance: 8,023; Referee: Eric Tattersall

July 30 20	San Diego Loyal	2-0	Colorado Springs Switchbacks FC	San Diego, California
3:00 PM	Corona 41'; Riley (yellow card) 45'; Moshobane (yellow card) 67'; Guido (yellow card) 90'; Damus 90'+2'	Report	Musa (yellow card) 16'; Agren (yellow card) 89'; Echevarria (yellow card) 90'+5'	Stadium: Torero Stadium; Attendance: 5,057; Referee: Elijio Arreguin

====== August ======
August 5 21	San Diego Loyal	1-3	Orange County SC	San Diego, California
7:00 PM	Conway 8'; Martin (yellow card) 35'; Stoneman (yellow card) 50'; Damus (yellow card) 59'	Report	Casiple (yellow card) 45'+1'; Scott (yellow card) 49'; Amang 52', 78', (yellow card) 53'; Iloski (yellow card) 60'; Shutler (yellow card) 85'; Osundina 90'+5'	Stadium: Torero Stadium; Attendance: 4,217; Referee: Malik Badawi

August 9 22	San Diego Loyal	2–1	Loudoun United FC	San Diego, CA
7:00 PM	Chilaka (yellow card) 7'; Stoneman (yellow card) 83'; Bodily 86'; Conway 90'	Report	Landry (yellow card) 20'; Garay (yellow card) 28'; Turner (yellow card) 40'; ElMedkhar 56'; Fauroux (yellow card) 86'; Rocha (yellow card) 85'	Stadium: Torero Stadium; Attendance: 3,214; Referee: Brad Jensen

Aug 12 23	San Diego Loyal SC	0-1	Memphis 901 FC	San Diego, CA
6:00 PM	Corona (penalty missed) 7 Conway (yellow card) 17'; Martin (yellow card) 61'; Adams (yellow card) 90'+2'	Report	da Costa 23'; Molloy (yellow card) 44'; Smith (yellow card) 84'	Stadium: Torero Stadium; Attendance: 4,524; Referee: Sergii Demianchuk

Aug 19 24	San Diego Loyal SC	2-2	Memphis 901 FC	San Diego, California
6:30 PM	Perez 4'; Guido (yellow card) 27'; Moshobane 55'; Stoneman (yellow card) 90'+2'; Kasanze (yellow card) 90'+8'	Report	Colonna 9'; Rivas (yellow card) 41'; Swartz (yellow card) 53'; Ryden (yellow card) 88'; Moreno 90'+1'	Stadium: Torero Stadium; Attendance: 4,982; Referee: Abdou Ndiaye

August 26 25	Rio Grande Valley FC	2–3	San Diego Loyal SC	Edinburg, Texas
5:00 PM	Nodarse (yellow card) 38'; Ricketts 49'; Pinzón 73' (pen.)	Report	Adams (yellow card) 16'; Damus 32'; Moshobane 34', 77'; Guzmán (yellow card) 55'; Corona (yellow card) 84'; Conway (yellow card) 90+4'	Stadium: H-E-B Park; Attendance: 3,006; Referee: Natalie Simon

====== September ======
September 3 26	San Diego Loyal SC	3–0	Birmingham Legion	San Diego
3:00 p.m.	Bodily 18'; Moshobane 39'; Martin (yellow card) 69', (goal) 84'	Report	Nwegbo (yellow card) 20'; Mensah (yellow card) 70'	Stadium: Torero Stadium; Attendance: 4,224; Referee: Joshua Encarnación

September 9 27	Charleston Battery	2-0	San Diego Loyal SC	Mount Pleasant, South Carolina
4:30 PM	Trager 45'+1', 47'; Ycaza (yellow card) 45'+3'; Dodson (yellow card) 70'	Report	Stoneman (yellow card) 66'; Damus (yellow card) 71'; Guzmán (yellow card) 76'	Stadium: Patriots Point Soccer Complex; Attendance: 3,691; Referee: Gerald Flores

September 16 28	Louisville City FC	1-0	San Diego Loyal SC	Louisville, Kentucky
4:30 PM	Harris 5'; Charpie (yellow card) 22'; Gibson (yellow card) 73'; Serrano (yellow card) 75'; Perez (yellow card) 87'	Report	Conway (yellow card) 78'	Stadium: Lynn Family Stadium; Attendance: 11,121; Referee: Nabil Bensalah

September 20 29	Monterey Bay FC	2–3	San Diego Loyal SC	Seaside, California
7:00 PM	Gleadle 23'; Lara 37'	Report	Perez 44'; Martin (yellow card) 45+1'; Riley (yellow card) 82'; Gnaulati 90', 90+3'	Stadium: Cardinale Stadium; Attendance: 3,427; Referee: Melvin Rivas

September 30 30	San Diego Loyal SC	1–1	Las Vegas Lights FC	San Diego, California
7:00 PM	Perez 27'; Guido (yellow card) 62'; Guzmán (yellow card) 89'	Report	Rios 16'; Jiménez (yellow card) 39'	Stadium: Torero Stadium; Attendance: 5,107; Referee: Deshun Beard

September 30 31	San Diego Loyal SC	4–1	Monterey Bay FC	San Diego, California
7:00 PM	Damus 26', 73', 90+6', (yellow card) 66'; Guzmán 29'; Adams (yellow card) 90'	Report	Lara (yellow card) 11'; Doner 19'	Stadium: Torero Stadium; Attendance: 5,671; Referee: Benjamin Meyer

====== October ======
October 4 32	El Paso Locomotive FC	0–0	San Diego Loyal SC	El Paso, Texas
7:00 PM		Report		Stadium: Southwest University Park; Attendance: 6,792; Referee: Gerald Flores

October 7 33	San Diego Loyal SC	4–2	Oakland Roots SC	San Diego, California
7:00 PM	Corona 17'; Damus 19', 25' (yellow card) 90'+2'; Adrien Perez (yellow card) 28' (goal) 44'; Guido (yellow card) 84'	Report	Tamacas 13'; Donasiyano (yellow card) 46'; Klimenta 82'	Stadium: Torero Stadium; Attendance: 5,671; Referee: Matthew Thompson

October 14 34	Las Vegas Lights FC	0-2	San Diego Loyal SC	Las Vegas, Nevada
7:00 PM	Jiménez (yellow card) 45'+2'; Mitrano (yellow card) 85'; Zali (yellow card) 90'+4'	Report	Riley (yellow card) 45'; Moshobane 56'; Perez 85'	Stadium: Cashman Field; Referee: Alex Billeter

==== USL Cup Playoffs ====
October 22, 2023 Quarterfinals	San Diego Loyal SC	3–4 (a.e.t.)	Phoenix Rising FC	San Diego, California
7:30 pm PDT	Damus 4', 25', 90+7' (pen.); Adams (yellow card) 45+2'	Report	Armenakas 19' (pen.); Trejo 42'; Formella 51', 119'; Harvey (yellow card) 57'; Arteaga (yellow card) 87'; Traore (yellow card) 90+5'; Fuenmayor (yellow card) 97'	Stadium: Torero Stadium; Attendance: 5,671; Referee: Elvis Osmanovic

=== U.S. Open Cup ===
April 5 Second Round	San Diego Loyal SC (USLC) (California)	2–0	(California) Albion San Diego (NISA)	San Diego, California
7:00 PM PDT	Adams 25' (pen.); Riley (yellow card) 32'; Conway (yellow card) 28' (goal) 52'	Report	Mitchell (yellow card) 25'; Gboe (yellow card) 74'; Patti (yellow card) 90'+2'	Stadium: SDSU Sports Deck; Attendance: 1,200; Referee: Ricardo Fierro

April 26 Third Round	Seattle Sounders FC (MLS) (Washington (state))	5–4	(California) San Diego Loyal SC (USLC)	Tukwila, Washington
7:00 PM PDT	Montero 15', 120+3' (pen.); Dobbelaere 26'; Arreaga (yellow card) 52'; Rothrock 55'; Kitahara (yellow card) 88'; Uderitz (yellow card) 92'; Baker-Whiting 101'	Report	Corona 53' (pen.), 73' (yellow card) 54'; Adams 90+3'; Simba 115'	Stadium: Starfire Sports; Attendance: 3,728; Referee: Cristian Campo Hernández
