= Maikon Orellana =

Salvadoran footballer (born 1993)

Personal information
- Full name: Maikon Jonathan Orellana Morán
- Date of birth: November 12, 1993 (age 32)
- Place of birth: Chalatenango, El Salvador
- Height: 5 ft 9 in (1.75 m)
- Position: Forward

Youth career
- 2010–2012: Real Salt Lake AZ
- 2012–2013: Brøndby

Senior career*
Years	Team	Apps	(Gls)
2013–2014	Brøndby	0	(0)
2014–2015	Alianza	15	(3)
2015–2017	Real Monarchs	45	(7)

International career^{‡}
2013	El Salvador U20	3	(0)
2014	El Salvador	1	(0)
- * Club domestic league appearances and goals as of October 6, 2016 ‡ National team caps and goals as of April 27, 2015

Maikon Jonathan Orellana Morán (born November 12, 1993) is a retired Salvadoran footballer who last played for Real Monarchs SLC in the USL.

== Career ==
=== Professional ===
Orellana began his career with the Real Salt Lake AZ academy in 2010, before joining Brøndby IF reserves in 2012. In his first season with the Danish club, he helped his team win Group B of the reserves league, scoring 3 goals. On 6 June 2013, he a professional one-year contract with the club. However, he left the club in 2014 without making a first team appearance. On 25 May 2014, he then joined Salvadorian club Alianza, where he made 15 appearances and tallied three goals before being released by the club in 2015.

On 5 April 2015, it was announced that Orellana joined USL club Real Monarchs SLC. He made his debut for the club on April 25 in a 1–0 defeat to LA Galaxy II.

=== International ===
Orellana was a member of the Salvadoran under-20 squad that competed at the 2013 FIFA U-20 World Cup in Turkey. He made his senior national team debut on 10 October 2014, in a 3–0 defeat to Colombia.

== Career statistics ==
=== Club ===
As of 8 December 2023

Appearances and goals by club, season and competition
Club	Season	League			National Cup		Total	
Club	Season	Division	Apps	Goals	Apps	Goals	Apps	Goals
Alianza	2014–15	Salvadorian Primera División	15	3	0	0	15	3
Real Monarchs	2015	USL Championship	22	2	1	0	23	2
Real Monarchs	2016	USL Championship	23	5	0	0	23	5
Real Monarchs	Total		45	7	1	0	46	7
Career total			60	10	1	0	61	10
