= Boyd Okwuonu =

American soccer player (born 1993)

Personal information
- Full name: Boyd Obunikechukwu Okwuonu
- Date of birth: February 24, 1993 (age 33)
- Place of birth: Lagos, Nigeria
- Height: 1.75 m (5 ft 9 in)
- Position: Defender

Youth career
- 2008–2009: IMG Academy
- 2009–2011: FC Dallas

College career
Years	Team	Apps	(Gls)
2011–2014	North Carolina Tar Heels	89	(0)

Senior career*
Years	Team	Apps	(Gls)
2012	Carolina Dynamo	7	(0)
2014	Orlando City U-23	5	(0)
2015–2016	Real Salt Lake	5	(0)
2015–2016	→ Real Monarchs (loan)	27	(1)

International career^{‡}
2009	United States U17	3	(0)
2010–2011	United States U18	5	(0)
2012–2013	United States U20	15	(0)
2015	United States U23	11	(0)
Medal record
Representing United States
Runner-up	CONCACAF U-20 Championship	2013
- * Club domestic league appearances and goals as of November 16, 2016 ‡ National team caps and goals as of November 15, 2015

Boyd Obunikechukwu Okwuonu (born February 24, 1993) is an American former professional soccer player.

== Career ==
=== Youth, college and amateur ===
Okwuonu was a member of both the U.S. Soccer Residency program and the FC Dallas Development Academy program before spending his entire college career at the University of North Carolina. He made a total of 89 appearances for the Tar Heels and was named to the All-ACC First Team three years in a row. Okwuonu also played in the Premier Development League for Carolina Dynamo and Orlando City U-23.

=== Professional ===
On January 15, 2015, Okwuonu was selected in the second round (27th overall) of the 2015 MLS SuperDraft by Real Salt Lake. On March 20, he was sent on loan to USL affiliate club Real Monarchs SLC. He made his professional debut two days later in a goalless draw on the road against LA Galaxy II.

=== International ===
Okwuonu was a member of the U.S. under-17 national team at the 2009 FIFA U-17 World Cup. He also represented the U.S. at the U18, U20 and U23 level.
