= Brentton Muhammad =

Footballer (born 1990)

Personal information
- Date of birth: 11 September 1990 (age 36)
- Place of birth: London, England
- Position: Goalkeeper

Team information
- Current team: Vestri

College career
Years	Team	Apps	(Gls)
2009–2012	Florida Tech Panthers		
2013	South Florida Bulls	20	(0)

Senior career*
Years	Team	Apps	(Gls)
2012–2013	VSI Tampa Bay FC	21	(0)
2014–2015	Catholic United	7	(0)
2015	Ægir	15	(0)
2015	Hoppers		
2016	Hullbridge Sports	1	(0)
2016–2017	Tindastóll	36	(0)
2018–	Vestri	41	(0)

International career^{‡}
2014–	Antigua and Barbuda	15	(0)
- * Club domestic league appearances and goals as of 20 August 2022 ‡ National team caps and goals as of 22:22, 5 June 2021 (UTC)

Brentton Muhammad (born 11 September 1990) is a professional footballer who plays as a goalkeeper for Vestri. Born in England, he represents the Antigua and Barbuda national team internationally.

== Club career ==
Muhammad played college football in the United States for Florida Tech Panthers and then South Florida Bulls before signing for VSI Tampa Bay FC.

On his return to England he played for Catholic United.

in April 2015 he went on trial at Icelandic second division club Ægir and was awarded a one-year contract.

He joined Greenbay Hoppers in October 2015 and was part of their title-winning team.

He returned to England, playing in 2016 for Hullbridge Sports.

In 2016 he joined Tindastóll in Iceland after almost signing for a Mexican club. In 2018 he joined Vestri.

== International career ==
Muhammad was one of eight overseas based players who committed to represent the country in the summer of 2014 making his full international debut on 3 September 2014 in a match against Anguilla in the Caribbean Cup.
