= Jamie McGuinness =

English footballer

Personal information
- Date of birth: 5 May 1990 (age 36)
- Place of birth: Watford, England
- Position: Defender

Youth career
- 2006–2008: Luton Town

Senior career*
Years	Team	Apps	(Gls)
2008–2010	Rushden & Diamonds	5	(0)
2009	→ Bedford Town (loan)	6	(1)
2009–2010	→ Weymouth (loan)	24	(1)
2010–2011	Weymouth	10	(0)
2012	VSI Tampa Flames	16	(1)
2013	VSI Tampa Bay	9	(0)
2014	IMG Academy Bradenton	12	(0)
2015	Colorado Springs Switchbacks	6	(0)
2016	Tampa Bay Rowdies 2	0	(0)
- * Club domestic league appearances and goals as of 21 April 2016

Jamie McGuinness (born 5 May 1990) is an English footballer who plays as a defender and is currently without a team.

== Career ==
After spending time in Luton Town's youth system, McGuinness joined Football Conference side Rushden & Diamonds where he made five appearances during the 2008–09 season. In the 2009–10 season, McGuinness was sent on loan to Bedford Town and Weymouth before signing a permanent deal with Weymouth in 2010-11 and made 10 appearances for the club during the year.

In 2012, McGuinness moved to the U.S. and joined PDL side VSI Tampa Flames where he made 16 appearances and scored his only goal of the year in the season opener on 6 May which ended in a 4–2 defeat to Ocala Stampede. He also led the club with five assists.

On 5 February 2013, McGuinness signed with newly formed USL Pro side VSI Tampa Bay FC. He made his debut on 1 June as a substitute in an inter-league match with the Portland Timbers Reserves which ended in a 4–4 draw after Tampa Bay conceded three unanswered goals in the second half.

On 23 January 2015, it was announced that McGuiness that was the second player on the squad of Colorado Springs Switchbacks FC

McGuinness was announced on 14 April 2016 as a member of the initial roster for the Tampa Bay Rowdies' NPSL reserve side Rowdies 2. Despite being rostered with the NPSL, McGuinness never appeared in a match with Rowdies 2.
