= Max Lachowecki =

American soccer player

Personal information
- Date of birth: June 30, 1992 (age 34)
- Place of birth: Evansville, Indiana, United States
- Height: 1.78 m (5 ft 10 in)
- Position: Defender

Youth career
- 2008–2011: Reitz Memorial Tigers

College career
Years	Team	Apps	(Gls)
2012–2015	Notre Dame Fighting Irish	85	(8)

Senior career*
Years	Team	Apps	(Gls)
2016–2017	Real Monarchs	59	(2)
2018	Tampa Bay Rowdies	16	(0)
2020–2021	Tampa Bay Rowdies	25	(1)
- * Club domestic league appearances and goals as of November 4, 2021

Max Lachowecki (born June 30, 1992) is an American soccer player.

== Early life ==
=== Youth soccer ===
Lachowecki grew up in Evansville, Indiana, playing with local youth soccer teams and for Reitz Memorial High School, where he was a four-year starter and led the team in scoring for his final three seasons with a total of 79 goals and 39 assists.

== Career ==
=== College ===
Lachowecki spent his entire college career at the University of Notre Dame. He made a total of 85 appearances for the Fighting Irish and tallied 8 goals and 9 assists.

=== Professional ===
On January 14, 2016, Lachowecki was selected in the second round (25th overall) of the 2016 MLS SuperDraft by Real Salt Lake.

He signed with Salt Lake's United Soccer League side Real Monarchs on March 17, 2016. On November 14, 2016, it was announced that he was retained by Real Monarchs for the United Soccer League 2017 season along with six other players.

Lachowecki scored his first professional goal on July 8, 2017, in a 4–1 win against Seattle Sounders FC 2.

Lachowecki was released by Real Monarchs on November 28, 2017. He was signed by the Tampa Bay Rowdies on January 30, 2018. He joins Kyle Curinga as the second Real Monarchs defender to be signed by the Rowdies during the offseason.

After taking a hiatus from professional soccer in 2019, Lachowecki rejoined the Rowdies on February 7, 2020.

Following the 2021 season it was announced that Lachowecki would leave the Rowdies.
