= Alec Sundly =

American soccer player

Personal information
- Full name: Alec Braedon Sundly
- Date of birth: July 8, 1992 (age 34)
- Place of birth: San Clemente, California, United States
- Height: 1.84 m (6 ft 0 in)
- Position: Midfielder

Youth career
- 2003–2010: Irvine Strikers

College career
Years	Team	Apps	(Gls)
2010–2013	California Golden Bears		

Senior career*
Years	Team	Apps	(Gls)
2012	Orange County Blue Star	1	(0)
2014	New England Revolution	0	(0)
2014	→ Rochester Rhinos (loan)	26	(2)
2015–2016	Real Monarchs	55	(2)
2017	Hörvikens IF	?	(?)
2017–2018	1. FCA Darmstadt	13	(4)
2020	California United Strikers	2	(0)

Managerial career
- 2020–2021: California Golden Bears (assistant)
- 2021–2023: UC Davis Aggies (assistant)
- 2023–: California Golden Bears (assistant)
- * Club domestic league appearances and goals as of September 6, 2020

Alec Braedon Sundly (born July 8, 1992) is an American soccer player who last played as a midfielder for California United Strikers in the National Independent Soccer Association.

== Career ==
Sundly played four years of college soccer at the University of California between 2010 and 2013. While at college, Sundly also made a single appearance for USL PDL side Orange County Blue Star in 2012.

On January 16, 2014, Sundly was selected 31st in the 2014 MLS SuperDraft by New England Revolution. He signed with the club on February 27, 2014.
