= Scott Brody =

American soccer player and coach

Personal information
- Full name: Scott B. Brody
- Date of birth: April 10, 1970 (age 56)
- Place of birth: Queens, United States
- Height: 5 ft 10 in (1.78 m)
- Position: Midfielder

Team information
- Current team: FC America (Head Coach)

Youth career
- 1988–1989: American Eagles
- 1990: UNLV Rebels

Senior career*
Years	Team	Apps	(Gls)
1991–1992	Las Vegas Dust Devils	33	(4)
1993	Colorado Elite SC	19	(2)

Managerial career
- 2005: Ajax America (Head of Commercial Operations)
- 2006: Ajax America (General Manager)
- 2007: FC Orlando
- 2008: Hunters Creek SC
- 2009: FC America Omni Sharks
- * Club domestic league appearances and goals

Scott B. Brody (born 10 April 1970 in Queens, New York) is a former national soccer player and current nationally licensed soccer coach in Florida

== Career ==
Brody is from Florida and had success in the Florida Youth Soccer Association (FYSA) Olympic Development Program (ODP) as a Regional III team player in the mid-1980s. Brody accepted a soccer scholarship to American University in Washington, D.C., in 1988 and played 2 seasons for Coach Pete Mehlert and the Eagles. Brody won Most Improved Player in 1989 as a central and right midfielder. Brody then transferred to the University of Nevada, Las Vegas (UNLV) to play for Coach Barry Barto in 1990. At UNLV Brody was an Academic All Big West Conference Scholar Athlete First Team player in 1991 and 1992. Brody's career at UNLV included playing with and against some of the best players in the country. Brody was offered contracts in Belgium and Sweden in 1993 but did not go. He played for the Las Vegas Dust Devils and in Colorado both semi-pro and professionally before retiring due to injury.

== Coaching career ==
Brody is nationally licensed with US Youth Soccer, has been FYSA Coach of the Year and National Soccer Coaches Association of America (NSCAA) adidas Boys Coach of the Year. Brody was Head of Commercial Operations for Ajax America, the North American Affiliate of Ajax Amsterdam FC, in 2005. In 2006, Brody was promoted to General Manager at Ajax America. Brody has been invited to attend the Leaders in Football Conference in Europe and is currently an Executive in the Hospitality industry in Florida. Brody is currently one of top coaches in country as evidenced here: http://youth1.com/article/1875537477-secret-behind-fca%E2%80%99s-soccer-success Brody is currently with the ECNL program and Purple Teams at Orlando City Soccer Club (http://www.orlandocitysc.com/post/2015/02/18/2015-super-y-tryouts-and-coaching-staff-announced). Brody's son Andrew Brody was a freshman all American at university of Louisville (http://www.gocards.com/sports/m-soccer/mtt/andrew_brody_857059.html) and was invited to U20 Men's National Team Camp in 2014 (http://www.ussoccer.com/stories/2014/03/17/12/52/140103-jan-camp-roster-rel).

== Honors ==
- 2011: USSF National "C" Coaching License
- 2010, 2011: Florida Youth Soccer Association Girls Coach of the Year
- 2005: NSCAA/Adidas East Regional Youth Boys Coach of the Year
- 2006: Florida Youth Soccer Association Boys Coach of the Year
- January 2001: Cornell University, School of Hospitality Management MVP
