= Charlie Adams (English footballer) =

English footballer (born 1994)

Personal information
- Full name: Charles James Adams
- Date of birth: 16 May 1994 (age 32)
- Place of birth: Hendon, England
- Height: 5 ft 9 in (1.75 m)
- Position: Midfielder

Team information
- Current team: Athletic Club Boise
- Number: 6

Youth career
- 2010–2012: Brentford

Senior career*
Years	Team	Apps	(Gls)
2012–2015	Brentford	4	(0)
2014	→ Barnet (loan)	5	(0)
2014	→ Stevenage (loan)	9	(0)
2015	Louisville City	20	(2)
2016	Stevenage	2	(0)
2016–2018	Real Monarchs	61	(8)
2019	Orange County SC	10	(0)
2019	Pinzgau Saalfelden	17	(3)
2020–2023	San Diego Loyal	101	(8)
2024	FC Tulsa	0	(0)
2024	Las Vegas Lights	21	(1)
2025	Colorado Springs Switchbacks	10	(0)
2026–	Athletic Club Boise	18	(0)
- * Club domestic league appearances and goals as of 12:48, 28 October 2026 (UTC)

Charles James Adams (born 16 May 1994) is an English professional footballer who plays as a midfielder for USL League One club Athletic Club Boise.

Adams is a product of the Brentford youth system and has played in England, the United States and Austria.

== Career ==
=== Brentford ===
During the 2010 off-season, Adams signed a two-year scholarship at League One club Brentford. Initially a left back, he had earlier joined the club's Centre of Excellence after being spotted by the Community Sports Trust and then progressing through the futsal scheme and the Advance Training Programme. Adams was an unused substitute during the first team's final match of the 2010–11 season, a 4–4 draw at Huddersfield Town. During the 2011–12 season, Adams made 22 appearances for the youth team in the Youth Alliance South East Conference and was a star in Brentford's run in the FA Youth Cup. He scored in a 2–1 victory over Hull City in the third round and was man of the match in a 2–1 defeat away to Stoke City in the fourth round, before injuries cut short his season.

Adams signed a one-year development squad contract in April 2012. Having completed his development from left back to left winger or attacking midfielder, he made his first team debut in a 2–0 league defeat away to Carlisle United on 9 March 2013, coming on as a 75th-minute substitute for Adam Forshaw, which proved to be his only appearance of the season. During the 2012–13 season, Adams made 22 development squad appearances and scored seven goals.

In June 2013, Adams signed a new two-year contract to remain part of the development squad. On 11 February 2014, Adams joined Conference Premier club Barnet on loan until the end of the 2013–14 season. He made five appearances during his spell, before being recalled by Brentford on 9 March. 11 days later, Adams was promoted into the first team squad and finished the 2013–14 season with three appearances.

Well down the pecking order following Brentford's promotion to the Championship, Adams was called into the first team squad on just one occasion during the first two months of the 2014–15 season. On 17 October 2014, Adams and Brentford teammate Josh Clarke joined League Two club Stevenage on one-month youth loans. After six appearances, the club took up the option of extending Adams' loan for another month. He made 11 appearances for Stevenage and returned to Griffin Park when his loan expired. He won no further first team call-ups before departing Brentford in late February 2015. Adams made just four senior appearances for Brentford, all as a substitute.

=== Louisville City and return to Stevenage ===
On 27 February 2015, Adams transferred to United Soccer League club Louisville City, after impressing manager James O'Connor while on loan at Stevenage. He made 21 appearances and scored three goals during a successful 2015 season, which saw City reach the Eastern Conference Finals. Despite being one year into a two-year contract, injury problems led to Adams' release at the end of the 2015 season. Adams returned to England to rejoin League Two club Stevenage on a short-term contract on 25 March 2016. He made two appearances and was released at the end of the 2015–16 season.

=== Real Monarchs ===
On 3 August 2016, Adams returned to the United Soccer League to join Real Monarchs. In what remained of the 2016 season, he scored one goal in five appearances and followed up in 2017 with 25 appearances and one goal. Adams improved his tally to 32 appearances and six goals during the 2018 season, but for the second season running, the Monarchs' campaign ended with defeat in the first round of the Western Conference play-off quarter-finals. He was released at the end of the 2018 season, after making 62 appearances and scoring eight goals for the club.

=== Orange County SC ===
On 19 December 2018, Adams signed a contract with USL Championship club Orange County SC. He made 11 appearances before his contract was terminated by mutual consent in June 2019.

=== FC Pinzgau Saalfelden ===
In July 2019, Adams signed a three-year contract with Austrian Regionalliga Salzburg club Pinzgau Saalfelden on a free transfer. He made 17 appearances and scored three goals before cost-cutting measures led to his contract being cancelled during the 2019–20 winter break.

=== Return to the USL Championship ===
On 5 February 2019, Adams returned to the United States to join USL Championship expansion team San Diego Loyal. He was retained by the club until it was dissolved at the end of the 2023 season. As captain, he made 106 appearances, scored 9 goals and helped the club to the USL Championship playoff quarter-finals on three occasions.

On 26 December 2023, Adams signed a contract with FC Tulsa. Prior to the beginning of the 2024 season, he transferred to Las Vegas Lights. Adams made 25 appearances and scored one goal during a 2024 season which concluded with defeat in the Western Conference Final. Adams remained under contract for the 2025 season, but elected to transfer to Colorado Springs Switchbacks in February 2025. He made 13 appearances during the 2025 season and did not appear in the club's unsuccessful playoff campaign. Adams was released at the end of the season.

=== Athletic Club Boise ===
On 7 January 2026, Adams signed a contract with newly-formed USL League One club Athletic Club Boise.

== Personal life ==
Adams' father is a retired professional footballer and his brother is a semi-professional footballer.

== Career statistics ==
As of match played 4 April 2026

Appearances and goals by club, season and competition
Club	Season	League			National cup (Note: Includes FA Cup, U.S. Open Cup)		League cup (Note: Includes EFL Cup, USL Cup)		Other		Total	
Club	Season	Division	Apps	Goals	Apps	Goals	Apps	Goals	Apps	Goals	Apps	Goals
Brentford	2010–11	League One	0	0	0	0	0	0	0	0	0	0
Brentford	2012–13	League One	1	0	0	0	0	0	0	0	1	0
Brentford	2013–14	League One	3	0	0	0	0	0	0	0	3	0
Brentford	2014–15	Championship	0	0	—		0	0	—		0	0
Brentford	Total		4	0	0	0	0	0	0	0	4	0
Barnet (loan)	2013–14	Conference Premier	5	0	—		—		—		5	0
Stevenage (loan)	2014–15	League Two	9	0	2	0	—		—		11	0
Louisville City	2015	United Soccer League	20	2	1	1	—		—		21	3
Stevenage	2015–16	League Two	2	0	—		—		—		2	0
Stevenage	Total		11	0	2	0	—		—		13	0
Real Monarchs	2016	United Soccer League	5	1	—		—		—		5	1
Real Monarchs	2017	United Soccer League	25	1	—		—		0	0	25	1
Real Monarchs	2018	United Soccer League	31	6	—		—		1 (Note: Appearance in United Soccer League Western Conference play-offs)	0	32	6
Real Monarchs	Total		61	8	—		—		1	0	62	8
Orange County SC	2019	USL Championship	10	0	1	0	—		—		11	0
Pinzgau Saalfelden	2019–20	Austrian Regionalliga Salzburg	17	3	—		—		—		17	3
San Diego Loyal	2020	USL Championship	16	1	—		—		—		16	1
San Diego Loyal	2021	USL Championship	32	1	—		—		1 (Note: Appearance(s) in USL Championship play-offs)	0	33	1
San Diego Loyal	2022	USL Championship	27	5	—		—		1	0	28	5
San Diego Loyal	2023	USL Championship	26	1	2	1	—		1	0	29	2
San Diego Loyal	Total		101	8	2	1	—		3	0	106	9
Las Vegas Lights	2024	USL Championship	21	1	1	0	—		3	0	25	1
Colorado Springs Switchbacks	2025	USL Championship	10	0	0	0	3	0	0	0	13	0
Athletic Club Boise	2026	USL League One	2	0	0	0	0	0	—		2	0
Career total			262	22	7	2	3	0	7	0	279	24

== Honours ==
Real Monarchs

- United Soccer League regular season: 2017
- United Soccer League Western Conference regular season: 2017
