= Juan Mare =

Argentine footballer

Personal information
- Full name: Juan Ignacio Mare
- Date of birth: May 3, 1995 (age 31)
- Place of birth: Córdoba, Argentina
- Height: 1.87 m (6 ft 2 in)
- Position: Forward

Youth career
- Instituto

Senior career*
Years	Team	Apps	(Gls)
2012–2015	Instituto	4	(0)
2014	Monarcas Morelia Premier	8	(1)
2015–2016	Club Atlas Premier	10	(3)
2017	Puebla	0	(0)
2017–2018	Real Monarchs	27	(4)
2019	Chattanooga Red Wolves	16	(0)
2020	Union Omaha	9	(0)
- * Club domestic league appearances and goals as of 25 October 2020

Juan Ignacio Mare (born 2 May 1995) is an Argentine professional footballer. He previously played for Club Puebla in Liga MX.
