= Nick Besler =

American soccer player (born 1993)

Personal information
- Date of birth: May 7, 1993 (age 33)
- Place of birth: Overland Park, Kansas, United States
- Height: 1.85 m (6 ft 1 in)
- Position: Midfielder

College career
Years	Team	Apps	(Gls)
2011–2014	Notre Dame Fighting Irish	72	(2)

Senior career*
Years	Team	Apps	(Gls)
2015–2016	Portland Timbers	0	(0)
2015–2016	Portland Timbers 2	50	(1)
2017–2022	Real Monarchs	36	(4)
2017–2022	Real Salt Lake	89	(2)
- * Club domestic league appearances and goals as of September 24, 2022

Nick Besler (born May 7, 1993) is an American professional soccer player.

== Career ==
=== College ===
Besler spent his entire college career at the University of Notre Dame. He made a total of 72 appearances for the Fighting Irish and tallied two goals and five assists. He also helped the Fighting Irish win the 2013 College Cup.

=== Professional ===
On January 15, 2015, Besler was selected 5th overall in the 2015 MLS SuperDraft by the Portland Timbers.

On March 29, he made his professional debut for USL affiliate club Portland Timbers 2 in a 3–1 victory over Real Monarchs SLC.

Besler signed with United Soccer League side Real Monarchs on January 2, 2017. He scored his first goal for Real Monarchs on March 28, 2017, in a 2–1 victory against his former club Portland Timbers 2. Besler was the captain for the club.

On August 24, 2017, Besler was signed to the Monarchs' Major League Soccer parent club Real Salt Lake.

Following the 2022 season, his contract option was declined by Salt Lake.

== Personal life ==
He is the younger brother of Matt Besler, a retired soccer player who played for Sporting Kansas City and Austin FC.

== Honors ==
Portland Timbers

- MLS Cup: 2015
- Western Conference (playoffs): 2015
