= Amass Amankona =

Ghanaian professional footballer

Personal information
- Full name: Fredrick "Amass" Amankona
- Date of birth: 2 August 1995 (age 31)
- Place of birth: Kumasi, Ghana
- Height: 1.70 m (5 ft 7 in)
- Position: Midfielder

Team information
- Current team: South Bend Lions

College career
Years	Team	Apps	(Gls)
2012	University of Ghana		
2013–2015	Dayton Flyers	61	(23)

Senior career*
Years	Team	Apps	(Gls)
2015	Charlotte Eagles	14	(3)
2016	Real Salt Lake	0	(0)
2016	Real Monarchs	26	(1)
2017	Dayton Dutch Lions	10	(0)
2018	Indy Eleven	1	(0)
2019–2020	Richmond Kickers	3	(0)
2021–	South Bend Lions	11	(2)
- * Club domestic league appearances and goals as of 27 March 2021

Fredrick "Amass" Amankona (born 2 August 1995) is a Ghanaian professional footballer who plays for USL League Two club South Bend Lions FC as a midfielder.

== Career ==
=== College and amateur ===
Amankona played three years of college soccer at the University of Dayton from 2013 to 2015. Prior to that, he'd spent a year at the University of Ghana.

While at college, Amankona played with Premier Development League side Charlotte Eagles.

=== Professional ===
On 19 January 2016, Amankona was selected 46th overall in the 2016 MLS SuperDraft by Real Salt Lake. However, he wasn't signed by Salt Lake, instead joining their United Soccer League affiliate Real Monarchs.

On 8 February 2018, Amankona joined the Indy Eleven of the United Soccer League.

On 4 January 2019, Amankona made the move to USL League One club Richmond Kickers.

In March 2021, Amankona joined USL League Two side South Bend Lions FC ahead of their first season of play.
