= Darion Copeland =

American soccer player

Personal information
- Full name: Darion Christopher Copeland
- Date of birth: March 8, 1993 (age 33)
- Place of birth: New York, New York, United States
- Height: 6 ft 2 in (1.88 m)
- Position: Defender

College career
Years	Team	Apps	(Gls)
2011–2014	UAB Blazers	77	(5)

Senior career*
Years	Team	Apps	(Gls)
2015–2016	Real Monarchs SLC	26	(1)
- * Club domestic league appearances and goals as of October 6, 2016

Darion Copeland (born March 8, 1993) is an American soccer player who most recently played for Real Monarchs SLC in the USL.

== College career ==
Copeland played for the UAB Blazers men's soccer team from 2011 to 2014. He played in 77 games and scored five goals for the Blazers.

== Professional career ==
On March 7, 2015, Copeland was announced as part of the Real Monarchs SLC inaugural squad. He made 26 appearances and scored one goal for the team before being released following the end of the 2016 season.
