= Eric Osswald =

American soccer player (born 1991)

Personal information
- Full name: Eric David Osswald
- Date of birth: November 3, 1991 (age 34)
- Place of birth: Powell, Ohio, United States
- Height: 1.85 m (6 ft 1 in)
- Position: Goalkeeper

Youth career
- 2009–2010: Crew Soccer Academy

College career
Years	Team	Apps	(Gls)
2010–2012	South Florida Bulls	13	(0)
2013–2014	Xavier Musketeers	39	(0)

Senior career*
Years	Team	Apps	(Gls)
2011	Carolina Dynamo	5	(0)
2012	VSI Tampa Flames	7	(0)
2014	Cincinnati Dutch Lions	12	(0)
2015–2016	Real Monarchs	11	(0)
- * Club domestic league appearances and goals as of October 6, 2016

Eric David Osswald (born November 3, 1991) is an American soccer player.

== Career ==
=== Youth, college and amateur ===
Osswald spent his youth career with the Columbus Crew Academy before signing a letter of intent to play college soccer at the University of South Florida. After redshirting his freshman year with the Bulls, Osswald made 13 appearances from 2011 to 2012 before transferring to Xavier University.

In his two seasons with the Musketeers, Osswald made 39 appearances and recorded 17 clean sheets. In 2014, he set a school record for clean sheets with 11 and a 0.74 goals against average on his way to being named NSCAA All-Great Lakes Region First Team, Big East Goalkeeper of the Year and All-Big East First Team.

Osswald also played in the Premier Development League for Carolina Dynamo, VSI Tampa Flames and Cincinnati Dutch Lions.

=== Professional ===
On January 8, 2015, it was announced that Osswald would take part in Major League Soccer's player combine. However, he went undrafted in the 2015 MLS SuperDraft. He later joined USL expansion side Real Monarchs SLC for the 2015 season and made his professional debut on April 25 in a 1–0 defeat to LA Galaxy II.
