= Emilio Orozco =

American soccer player

Personal information
- Full name: Emilio Orozco Plascencia
- Date of birth: April 29, 1992 (age 34)
- Place of birth: Oxnard, California, U.S.
- Height: 1.78 m (5 ft 10 in)
- Position: Defender

Team information
- Current team: Oxnard Guerreros

Youth career
- 2007–2009: IMG Soccer Academy
- 2009–2010: Real So Cal
- 2010–2012: Tigres

Senior career*
Years	Team	Apps	(Gls)
2012–2013	Tigres	0	(0)
2012	→ Fort Lauderdale Strikers (loan)	14	(0)
2013	Chivas USA	0	(0)
2015–2017	Real Monarchs	54	(2)
2018–	Oxnard Guerreros	0	(0)

International career^{‡}
2007–2009	United States U17	8	(0)
2010	United States U20	4	(0)
- * Club domestic league appearances and goals as of 11:56, October 21, 2017 (UTC) ‡ National team caps and goals as of April 21, 2012

Emilio Orozco Plascencia (born April 29, 1992) is an American soccer player who currently plays for Oxnard Guerreros FC in the National Premier Soccer League.

== Career ==
=== Club ===
After graduating from High School, Orozco joined Mexican Primera División side Tigres de la UANL. On March 19, 2012, Orozco joined NASL side Fort Lauderdale Strikers on a season-long loan. On April 21, Orozco made his debut for the club, coming on as a 71st minute sub in a 2–2 draw on the road against San Antonio Scorpions FC.

On February 27, 2013, Chivas USA announced that Orozco and Josue Soto had joined the club after impressing during a pre-season trial.

On March 24, 2015, Orozco signed with Real Monarchs.

=== International ===
Orozco has represented the United States at the Under 17 and Under 20 level.

== Honors ==
Real Monarchs

- USL Championship Regular Season Title: 2017
