= Daniel Haber (soccer) =

Canadian soccer player (born 1992)

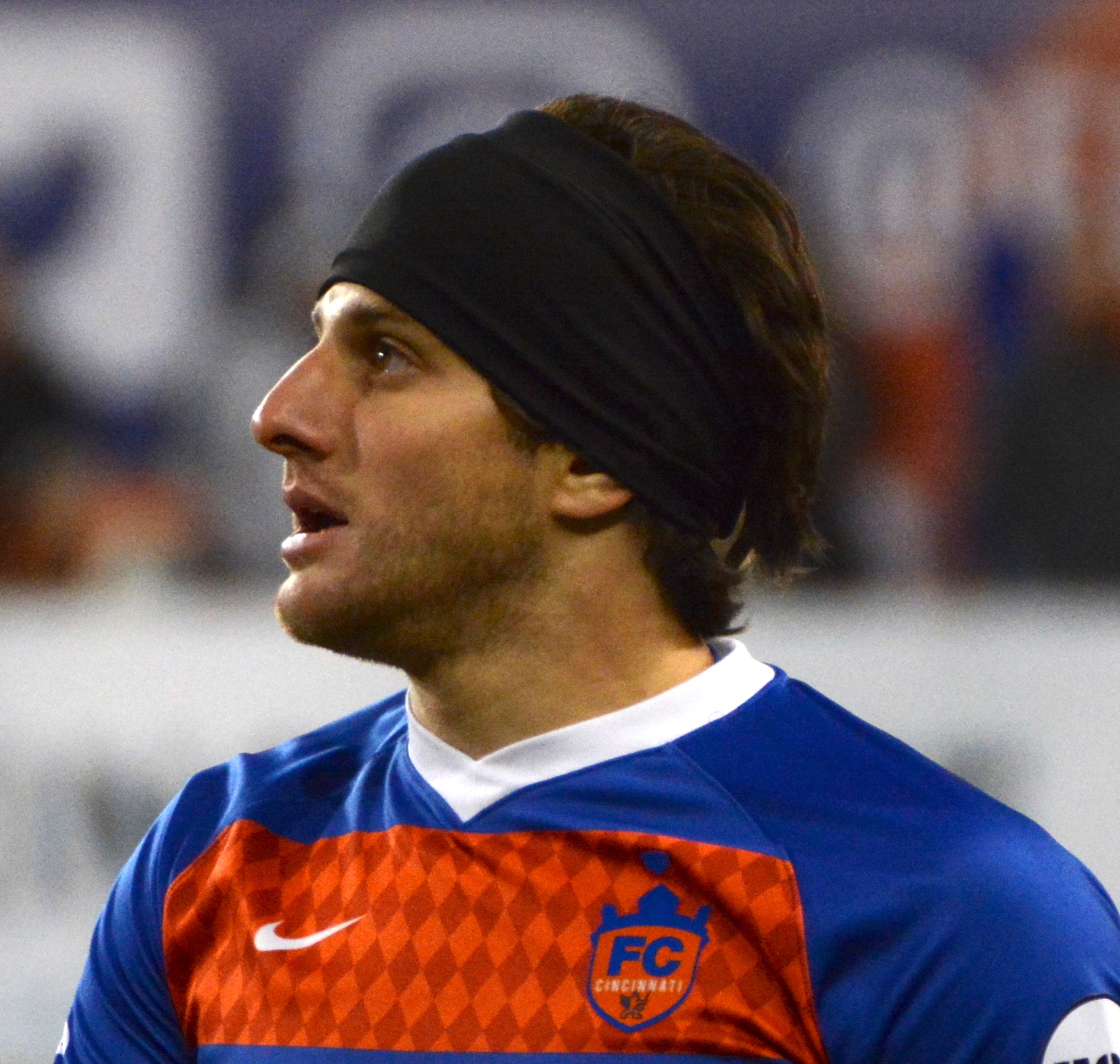
- Haber playing for FC Cincinnati in 2018

Personal information
- Full name: Daniel Bram Haber
- Date of birth: May 20, 1992 (age 34)
- Place of birth: Toronto, Ontario, Canada
- Height: 1.78 m (5 ft 10 in)
- Position: Forward

College career
Years	Team	Apps	(Gls)
2010–2012	Cornell	50	(28)

Senior career*
Years	Team	Apps	(Gls)
2013	Maccabi Haifa	4	(2)
2013–2015	Apollon Limassol	18	(3)
2014–2015	→ Ayia Napa (loan)	30	(3)
2015–2016	Hapoel Nir Ramat HaSharon	17	(5)
2016	Whitecaps FC 2	30	(7)
2017	Real Monarchs	29	(7)
2017	→ Real Salt Lake (loan)	0	(0)
2018	FC Cincinnati	7	(0)
2018	Ottawa Fury	10	(0)
Total		145	(27)

International career
2013–2014	Canada	5	(0)
- * Club domestic league appearances and goals

Daniel Bram Haber (born May 20, 1992) is a Canadian retired soccer player who played as a forward. During a professional career that spanned six years, he appeared for Maccabi Haifa, Apollon Limassol, Ayia Napa, Hapoel Nir Ramat HaSharon, Whitecaps FC 2, Real Monarchs, Real Salt Lake, FC Cincinnati, and Ottawa Fury FC. Haber was capped five times by the Canada national team.

== Youth and college ==
Haber played three seasons for Cornell University, an Ivy League University in U.S. NCAA Division 1 soccer. In 2012, his junior year, Haber scored 18 goals and made 7 assists during the regular season and finished the year on top of the country in points per game and goals per game. In addition to leading the NCAA in scoring, in 2012 Haber was named a first-team All-American, Ivy League player of the year, and a finalist for the Hermann Trophy (U.S. college soccer's highest individual honour).

== Club career ==
=== Maccabi Haifa ===
Haber signed with Maccabi Haifa in the Israeli Premier League in early January 2013, after he decided to forgo his senior year of eligibility at Cornell University. Although not playing any games in his first few months in Israel, he made the most of his limited minutes, scoring 2 goals in 4 games in his first professional season – his first goal coming against Ironi Ramat HaSharon on May 5, 2013.

=== Apollon Limassol ===
On June 24, 2013, Cyprus First Division side Apollon Limassol confirmed that Haber had signed a 1+1 year contract with them. When interviewed, Haber stated that Haifa were interested in re-signing him, but he felt that this would be a good move for his young career, particularly with the opportunity of getting more playing time. Haber scored his first goal for the club on September 28, 2013, in a 2–1 win over Alki Larnaca. In the summer of 2014, he was loaned to the newly promoted top-flight side Ayia Napa for the 2014–15 season.

==== Loan to Ayia Napa ====
Haber was loaned to Ayia Napa for the 2014–15 season on July 2, 2014. He made his debut for the club on August 23 in a loss to Ethnikos Achnas. He would score his first goal for the team on August 31 in a draw against Doxa Katokopia.

=== Hapoel Nir Ramat HaSharon ===
On July 23, 2015, signed to Hapoel Nir Ramat HaSharon.

=== Whitecaps FC 2 ===
Haber signed with Whitecaps FC 2 on January 27, 2016.

=== Real Monarchs ===
On November 17, 2016, Haber signed with United Soccer League side and Real Salt Lake 2nd team Real Monarchs.

=== FC Cincinnati ===
On November 15, 2017, Haber signed with FC Cincinnati for the 2018 United Soccer League season.

=== Ottawa Fury ===
On July 9, 2018, Haber joined United Soccer League side Ottawa Fury on a free transfer. After the 2018 season, the Fury would announce that Haber would not return to the Fury for the 2019 season.

== International career ==
On May 23, 2013, Haber earned his first call-up to the Canada national team for a friendly in the following week against Costa Rica. Haber made his senior international debut on May 28, 2013, coming on as a second-half substitute for Issey Nakajima-Farran in their 1–0 defeat to Costa Rica at Commonwealth Stadium.

Haber's last international appearance was in a friendly against Moldova on May 27, 2014, which resulted in a 1–1 draw.

== Career statistics ==
=== Club ===
Appearances and goals by club, season and competition
Club	Season	League			National cup (Note: Includes Cypriot Cup, Israel State Cup, U.S. Open Cup, and Canadian Championship)		League cup (Note: Includes Toto Cup)		Continental (Note: Includes UEFA Europa League)		Other (Note: Includes USL Cup Playoffs)		Total	
Club	Season	Division	Apps	Goals	Apps	Goals	Apps	Goals	Apps	Goals	Apps	Goals	Apps	Goals
Maccabi Haifa	2012–13	Israeli Premier League	4	2	0	0	0	0	–		–		4	2
Apollon Limassol	2013–14	Cypriot First Division	18	3	3	1	–		4	0	0	0	25	4
Apollon Limassol	2014–15	Cypriot First Division	0	0	0	0	–		0	0	–		0	0
Apollon Limassol	Total		18	3	3	1	0	0	4	0	0	0	25	4
Ayia Napa (loan)	2014–15	Cypriot First Division	30	3	1	0	–		–		–		31	3
Hapoel Nir Ramat HaSharon	2015–16	Liga Leumit	17	5	1	1	4	1	–		–		22	7
Whitecaps FC 2	2016	USL	30	7	–		–		–		3	1	33	8
Real Monarchs	2017	USL	29	7	–		–		–		1	0	30	7
Real Salt Lake (loan)	2017	MLS	0	0	1	0	–		–		–		1	0
FC Cincinnati	2018	USL	7	0	3	1	–		–		0	0	10	1
Ottawa Fury FC	2018	USL	10	0	2	0	–		–		–		12	0
Career total			145	27	11	3	4	1	4	0	4	1	168	32

=== International ===
Appearances and goals by national team and year
National team	Year	Apps	Goals
Canada	2013	3	0
Canada	2014	2	0
Total		5	0
