= Elder Torres =

Honduran footballer (born 1995)

Élder Torres
Personal information
- Full name: Hilder Eduardo Torres Guatemala
- Date of birth: April 14, 1995 (age 31)
- Place of birth: La Ceiba, Honduras
- Height: 5 ft 9 in (1.75 m)
- Position: Left midfielder

Team information
- Current team: Lobos UPNFM
- Number: 10

Youth career
- Vida

Senior career*
| Years | Team | Apps | (Gls) |
| 2013–2020 | Vida | 107 | (3) |
| 2016 | → Real Monarchs (loan) | 16 | (1) |
| 2020 | Honduras Progreso | 6 | (0) |
| 2020 | Vida | 11 | (1) |
| 2021– | Lobos UPNFM | 67 | (2) |

International career
| 2015 | Honduras U20 | 2 | (0) |
| 2015–2016 | Honduras U23 | 3 | (0) |
- * Club domestic league appearances and goals as of 20:20, 12 November 2023 (UTC)

Hilder Eduardo Torres Guatemala (born 14 April 1995) is a Honduran footballer who currently plays for Lobos UPNFM in the Liga Salva Vida.

== Career ==
Torres began his career with Honduran side Vida, and later moved on loan to United Soccer League Real Monarchs SLC on 8 February 2016.
