= Lennon (Brazilian footballer) =

Brazilian footballer

Personal information
- Full name: Lennon Eduardo Carvalho Celestino
- Date of birth: October 2, 1991 (age 35)
- Place of birth: Franca, São Paulo, Brazil
- Height: 6 ft 0 in (1.83 m)
- Position: Midfielder

Youth career
- Desportivo Brasil

Senior career*
| Years | Team | Apps | (Gls) |
| 2009 | Desportivo Brasil | | |
| 2010 | → Miami FC (loan) | 8 | (0) |
| 2011 | → Fort Lauderdale Strikers (loan) | 6 | (0) |
| 2012–2015 | União Barbarense | 16 | (0) |
| 2015–2016 | Real Monarchs | 22 | (0) |
- * Club domestic league appearances and goals as of June 28, 2015

Lennon Eduardo Carvalho Celestino, commonly known as Lennon (born October 2, 1991 in city: Franca state: São Paulo) is a Brazilian footballer.

== Career ==
Lennon was part of the youth squad at Desportivo Brasil, before signing for the team's American sister club Miami FC (which is also owned by Traffic Sports) in 2010.

Lennon made his professional debut on August 7, 2010 in a 1–1 tie with the Puerto Rico Islanders. He re-signed with the club, now renamed Fort Lauderdale Strikers and playing in the North American Soccer League, on February 8, 2011. Lennon left the club and returned to Brazil on July 20, 2011.
