= Jesús Leal =

Mexican footballer (born 1992)

Personal information
- Full name: Jesús Antonio Leal Bernal
- Date of birth: 18 December 1992 (age 33)
- Place of birth: Culiacan, Mexico
- Height: 1.76 m (5 ft 9 in)
- Position: Midfielder

Senior career*
Years	Team	Apps	(Gls)
2013–2016	América	4	(0)
2015–2016	→ Sonora (loan)	18	(1)
2016–2017	Real Monarchs	7	(0)
2017–2018	León	0	(0)
2019	Potros UAEM	2	(0)
2019	Real Estelí	14	(0)
2020	Coras Nayarit	8	(0)
- * Club domestic league appearances and goals as of 2 January 2021 (UTC)

Jesús Antonio Leal Bernal (born 18 December 1992) is a Mexican professional footballer who plays as a midfielder for Coras de Nayarit.

== Club career ==
=== América ===
Jesús Leal debuted with América during the Apertura 2013, making three appearances, and also played with the club in the CONCACAF Champions League tournament that same year.

=== Potros UAEM ===
Leal signed with Potros UAEM for the 2019 season.

== Honours ==
América

- Liga MX: Apertura 2014

Real Monarchs

- USL Championship Regular Season Title: 2017
