= Kyle Curinga =

American professional soccer player

Personal information
- Date of birth: December 30, 1993 (age 32)
- Place of birth: Clearwater, Florida, United States
- Height: 6 ft 1 in (1.85 m)
- Position: Defender

Team information
- Current team: KPV
- Number: 12

College career
Years	Team	Apps	(Gls)
2012	Florida Atlantic Owls	8	(0)

Senior career*
Years	Team	Apps	(Gls)
2014–2015	GBK	50	(4)
2016	FF Jaro	21	(1)
2017	Real Monarchs	26	(2)
2018	Tampa Bay Rowdies	4	(0)
2019	Hartford Athletic	22	(0)
2020–	KPV	82	(6)
- * Club domestic league appearances and goals as of 27 November 2023

Kyle Curinga (born December 30, 1993) is an American professional soccer player who plays as a defender for KPV.

== Career ==
=== College ===
Curinga played college soccer as a midfielder at Florida Atlantic University for a single season in 2012.

=== Professional ===
Curinga moved to Finland, originally with GBK, and spent the 2016 season with FF Jaro. He moved back to the United States in 2017, signing with United Soccer League side Real Monarchs in March. Curinga was released by the Monarchs at the end of the 2017 season.

On January 9, 2018, Curinga was signed by his hometown team, the Tampa Bay Rowdies. Curinga had trialed with the Rowdies in early 2017, starting in the team's first preseason match of the year against VfL Wolfsburg as part of the 2017 Florida Cup.

On 30 January 2019, Curinga joined USL Championship expansion club Hartford Athletic.

Ahead of the 2020 season, Curinga joined Finnish team KPV. He scored his first goal in a 2020 Finnish Cup group stage match vs. FF Jaro on February 8, 2020.
