= Riggs Lennon =

American soccer player (born 1994)

Personal information
- Date of birth: May 26, 1994 (age 32)
- Place of birth: Paradise Valley, Arizona, United States
- Height: 6 ft 1 in (1.85 m)
- Position: Forward

Youth career
- –2013: Sereno SC

College career
| Years | Team | Apps | (Gls) |
| 2013–2015 | Virginia Cavaliers | 47 | (7) |
| 2016 | Creighton Bluejays | 23 | (10) |

Senior career*
| Years | Team | Apps | (Gls) |
| 2016 | Lane United | 7 | (1) |
| 2017 | Real Monarchs | 1 | (0) |
| 2018 | Tulsa Roughnecks | 5 | (0) |
| 2020 | Cleveland SC | 0 | (0) |
| Total | | 13 | (1) |
- * Club domestic league appearances and goals

Riggs Lennon (born May 26, 1994) is an American retired soccer player who played as a forward.

== College and amateur ==
Lennon played college soccer at the University of Virginia from 2013 to 2015, transferring to Creighton University in 2016 for his senior year.

Lennon also appeared for Premier Development League side Lane United FC in 2016.

== Club career ==
Lennon signed with United Soccer League side Real Monarchs on April 29, 2017.

Lennon signed with Tulsa Roughnecks FC on December 19, 2017.

== Personal life ==
Riggs' brother is fellow soccer player Brooks Lennon, who plays for Atlanta United.
