= Nuukele Gboe =

Liberian football player

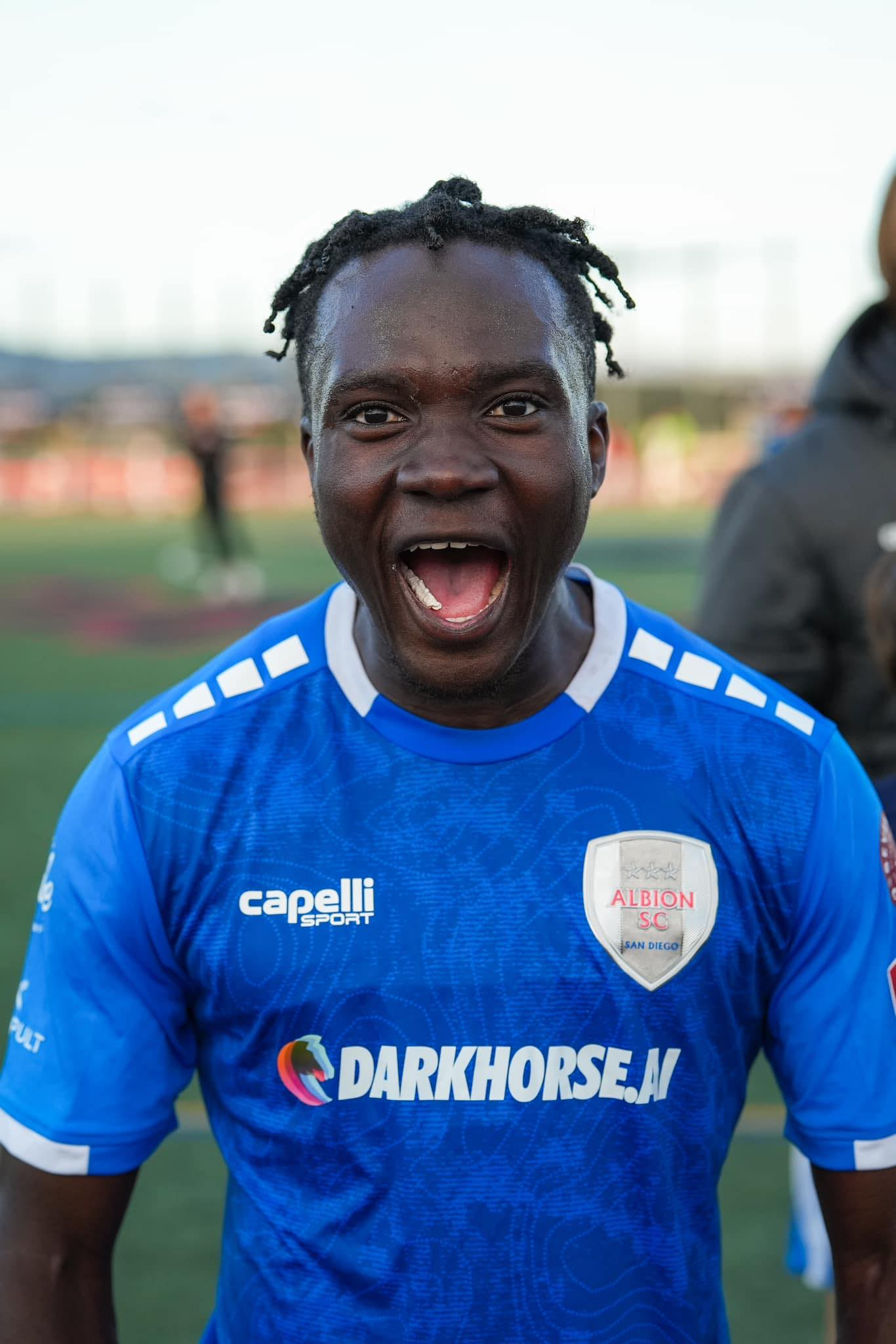

Personal information
- Full name: Nuukele Gboe
- Date of birth: April 8, 1997 (age 29)
- Place of birth: Gbarnga, Liberia
- Height: 1.75 m (5 ft 9 in)
- Position: Midfielder

Team information
- Current team: Georgia Lions FC

Youth career
- 2013-2014: Columbus Crew Academy
- 2015-2016: Pride SC
- 2017-2019: Niagara University

Senior career*
Years	Team	Apps	(Gls)
2019-2020	Dakota Fusion FC	15	(10)
2020–2021	FC Buffalo	15	(7)
2023-2024	Albion San Diego	9	(0)
2024-	Georgia Lions FC	13	(3)

International career
2017	Liberia U20	1	(0)
- * Club domestic league appearances and goals as of 18 May 2023

Nuukele Gboe (born April 8, 1997) is a Liberian footballer currently playing for Georgia Lions FC of the National Independent Soccer Association.

== Career ==
=== Club career ===
Gboe grew up in Ohio. Hee attended Groveport Madison High School.

Between 2018 and 2020, he left Northland Pioneer and joined Dakota Fusion FC in the National Premier Soccer League.

=== FC Buffalo and Niagara Purple Eagles ===
On 1 May 2020, Gboe signed with FC Buffalo in the USL League Two on loan.

He later joined Niagara Purple Eagles men's soccer on a permanent deal in the same year.

=== ASC San Diego ===
In April 2023, Gboe signed with Albion San Diego of the National Independent Soccer Association. After a series of matches with Albion San Diego, he appeared for them in a fixture against San Diego Loyal in the Lamar Hunt US Open Cup on April 5, 2023.

=== Georgia Lions FC ===
Gboe signed with Georgia Lions FC on January 4, 2024.

== International career ==
Gboe is eligible to represent the United States at the international level, but was called up by Liberia U-20 in an international friendly game in 2017.

== Career statistics ==
=== Club ===
As of 15 July 2023

Appearances and goals by club, season and competition
Club	Season	League			Cup		Other		Total	
Club	Season	Division	Apps	Goals	Apps	Goals	Apps	Goals	Apps	Goals
ASC San Diego	2022	NISA	0	0	0	0	0	0	0	0
ASC San Diego	2023	NISA	8	0	1	0	0	0	9	0
Career total			8	0	1	0	0	0	9	0
