= Edgar Duran =

American soccer player

Personal information
- Date of birth: May 31, 1996 (age 30)
- Place of birth: Palm Springs, California, United States
- Height: 1.64 m (5 ft 5 in)
- Position: Midfielder

Youth career
- Real Salt Lake AZ

Senior career*
Years	Team	Apps	(Gls)
2015–2016	Real Monarchs	6	(0)
2016	→ Kitsap Pumas (loan)	1	(0)
- * Club domestic league appearances and goals

Edgar Duran (born May 31, 1996) is an American soccer player.

== Career ==
Duran signed with United Soccer League side Real Monarchs out of the Real Salt Lake academy in August 2015. He had a short spell on loan with Premier Development League side Kitsap Pumas, who he joined on March 31, 2016.
