= James Moberg =

American soccer player

Personal information
- Date of birth: April 16, 1994 (age 32)
- Place of birth: Modesto, California, United States
- Height: 5 ft 2 in (1.57 m)
- Positions: Defender; midfielder

College career
Years	Team	Apps	(Gls)
2012–2015	Washington Huskies	69	(10)

Senior career*
Years	Team	Apps	(Gls)
2013	Washington Crossfire	9	(2)
2015	Portland Timbers U23s	6	(1)
2016–2021	Real Monarchs	106	(3)
2016	→ Carolina RailHawks (loan)	0	(0)
- * Club domestic league appearances and goals as of October 27, 2021

James Moberg (born April 16, 1994) is an American former soccer player who previously played for Real Monarchs in the USL Championship.

== Career ==
=== College ===
Moberg spent his entire college career at the University of Washington between 2012 and 2015, tallying ten goals and 21 assists in 69 appearances.

While at college, Moberg played in the Premier Development League with Washington Crossfire and Portland Timbers U23s.

=== Professional ===
On January 19, 2016, Moberg was selected in the third round (50th overall) of the 2016 MLS SuperDraft by Vancouver Whitecaps FC. However, he instead signed with Real Monarchs, the United Soccer League affiliate of Real Salt Lake, on April 20, 2016.

On October 25, 2021, Moberg announced retirement from professional soccer after spending six years with Real Monarchs.
