= Andrew Brody =

American soccer player

Personal information
- Date of birth: May 3, 1995 (age 31)
- Place of birth: Orlando, Florida, United States
- Height: 5 ft 10 in (1.78 m)
- Position: Defender

Youth career
- Real Salt Lake AZ

College career
Years	Team	Apps	(Gls)
2013–2015	Louisville Cardinals	61	(9)

Senior career*
Years	Team	Apps	(Gls)
2014–2015	Orlando City U-23	15	(2)
2016–2021	Real Monarchs	101	(6)
2019	→ Pinzgau Saalfelden (loan)	16	(4)
2021–2024	Real Salt Lake	112	(2)
2025	Sporting Kansas City	12	(0)
- * Club domestic league appearances and goals as of October 23, 2025

Andrew Brody (born May 3, 1995) is an American professional soccer player who plays as a defender.

== Career ==
=== College ===
Brody spent his entire college career at the University of Louisville. He made a total of 61 appearances for the Cardinals and tallied 9 goals and 15 assists.

While at college, Brody appeared for Premier Development League side Orlando City U-23 in 2014 and 2015.

=== Professional ===
He signed with Salt Lake's United Soccer League side Real Monarchs on November 15, 2015, ahead of the 2016 season.

On July 12, 2019, Brody was loaned to Austrian third-tier side Pinzgau Saalfelden.

Brody returned to Monarchs in July 2020.

On September 25, 2020, it was announced that Brody would join Real Salt Lake's MLS roster as a homegrown player for the 2021 season.

Brody made his debut for Real Salt Lake during their 2021 home opener on May 1, 2021, coming on as a substitute in the 30th minute for the injured Aaron Herrera. He recorded an assist five minutes later, crossing the ball to Damir Kreilach.

On February 18, 2025, Brody was waived by Salt Lake. He was acquired off waivers by Sporting Kansas City on February 20, 2025. Following the 2025 season, Kansas City opted to release him from the club.

== Personal life ==
Andrew's father is former soccer player and coach Scott Brody. He was born in Florida where he attended Freedom High School
