= Jorginho James =

Jamaican footballer (born 1994)

Personal information
- Date of birth: 7 July 1994 (age 32)
- Place of birth: Kingston, Jamaica
- Height: 1.88 m (6 ft 2 in)
- Position: Midfielder

Youth career
- 2011–2012: Kingston College

Senior career*
Years	Team	Apps	(Gls)
2012–2019	Harbour View	49	(10)
2013–2014	→ Grenades (loan)		
2015	→ Perak FA (loan)	0	(0)
2016–2018	→ Rio Grande Valley FC Toros (loan)	54	(3)
2017	→ Houston Dynamo (loan)	0	(0)
Total		103	(13)

International career
2013	Jamaica U20		
2012	Jamaica	2	(1)
- * Club domestic league appearances and goals

Jorginho James (born 7 July 1994) is a Jamaican former international footballer who played as a midfielder.

== Club career ==
Born in Kingston, James began his career with Kingston College. He then featured for RSPL club Harbour View. He spent time on loan at Grenades. He also had a short loan spells with Perak FA in the Malaysia Super League, but returned without making an appearance for the club. Jorginho has also trialed and trained at Reading United FC in the US and Shimizu S-Pulse in Japan.

He was loaned out again in March 2016 to United Soccer League side Rio Grande Valley FC Toros. He also played one US Open Cup game for the Houston Dynamo in 2017, being on trial at the club.

== International career ==
He made his senior international debut for Jamaica on 22 February 2012; James, 17 at the time, came on as an 82nd-minute substitute in the friendly match against Cuba, scoring five minutes later.

James also made his U20 debut in the 2013 CONCACAF U-20 Championship against Antigua and Barbuda on 7 November 2013.

== Personal life ==
In August 2024, James was accused of assaulting his wife in Texas, with a court date being set for October.

== Career statistics ==
=== International ===
Appearances and goals by national team and year
National team	Year	Apps	Goals
Jamaica	2012	2	1
Total		2	1

Scores and results list Jamaica's goal tally first, score column indicates score after each James goal.

List of international goals scored by Jorginho James
No.	Date	Venue	Opponent	Score	Result	Competition
1	22 February 2012	Independence Park, Kingston, Jamaica	Cuba	1–0	1–0	Friendly
