= Eti Tavares =

Bissau-Guinean footballer (born 1993)

Personal information
- Full name: Etiandro Igualdino Lopes Tavares
- Date of birth: July 24, 1993 (age 33)
- Place of birth: Bissau, Guinea-Bissau
- Height: 1.78 m (5 ft 10 in)
- Position: Forward

Youth career
- 2010–2011: Real Salt Lake AZ

College career
Years	Team	Apps	(Gls)
2011–2014	Arizona Western Matadors		

Senior career*
Years	Team	Apps	(Gls)
2015–2016	Real Monarchs	46	(3)
2017	Fresno Fuego	1	(0)
2018	Tulsa Roughnecks	28	(3)
2019	FC Tucson	13	(0)
- * Club domestic league appearances and goals as of 16 July 2020

Etiandro Igualdin Tavares (born July 24, 1993) is a Bissau-Guinean footballer who last played as a forward for FC Tucson in USL League One.

== Early life ==
Tavares grew up in Guinea-Bissau during the nation's civil war before he moved to Santa Rosa, California, at the age of 11, later settling in Windsor, California. He initially did not speak English, but was able to communicate with Spanish-speaking children in his native Portuguese. Tavares attended Windsor High School.

== Career ==
=== Professional ===
On March 6, 2015, it was announced that Tavares signed a professional contract with USL club Real Monarchs SLC. On March 22, he made his professional debut in a 0–0 draw against LA Galaxy II.
