= Hörvikens IF =

Swedish football club

- Full name: Hörvikens Idrottsförening
- Nicknames: HIF, Di Gröne
- Short name: HIF
- Ground: Gröna Vallen; Sölvesborg; Sweden
- Chairman: Anders Thege
- Head coach: Jacob Lennartsson
- Coach: Joakim Broberg
- League: Division 4 Blekinge
- 2019: Division 3 Sydöstra Götaland, 10th (relegated)
Home colours

Hörvikens IF is a Swedish football club located in Sölvesborg.

== Background ==
Hörvikens IF currently plays in Division 4 Blekinge which is the sixth tier of Swedish football. They play their home matches at the Gröna Vallen in Sölvesborg.

The club is affiliated to Blekinge Fotbollförbund. Hörvikens IF have competed in the Svenska Cupen on 18 occasions.

== Season to season ==
Season	Level	Division	Section	Position	Movements
1993	Tier 5	Division 4	Blekinge	4th	
1994	Tier 5	Division 4	Blekinge	6th	
1995	Tier 5	Division 4	Blekinge	6th	
1996	Tier 5	Division 4	Blekinge	7th	
1997	Tier 5	Division 4	Blekinge	9th	
1998	Tier 5	Division 4	Blekinge	11th	Relegation Playoffs – Relegated
1999	Tier 6	Division 5	Blekinge	2nd	Promoted
2000	Tier 5	Division 4	Blekinge	11th	Relegation Playoffs – Relegated
2001	Tier 6	Division 5	Blekinge Västra	1st	Promoted
2002	Tier 5	Division 4	Blekinge	3rd	
2003	Tier 5	Division 4	Blekinge	5th	
2004	Tier 5	Division 4	Blekinge	1st	Promoted
2005	Tier 4	Division 3	Sydvästra Götaland	12th	Relegated
2006*	Tier 6	Division 4	Blekinge	8th	
2007	Tier 6	Division 4	Blekinge	10th	
2008	Tier 6	Division 4	Blekinge	7th	
2009	Tier 6	Division 4	Blekinge	3rd	
2010	Tier 6	Division 4	Blekinge	7th	
2011	Tier 6	Division 4	Blekinge	6th	

* League restructuring in 2006 resulted in a new division being created at Tier 3 and subsequent divisions dropping a level.
