= Sebastián Velásquez =

Colombian footballer (born 1991)

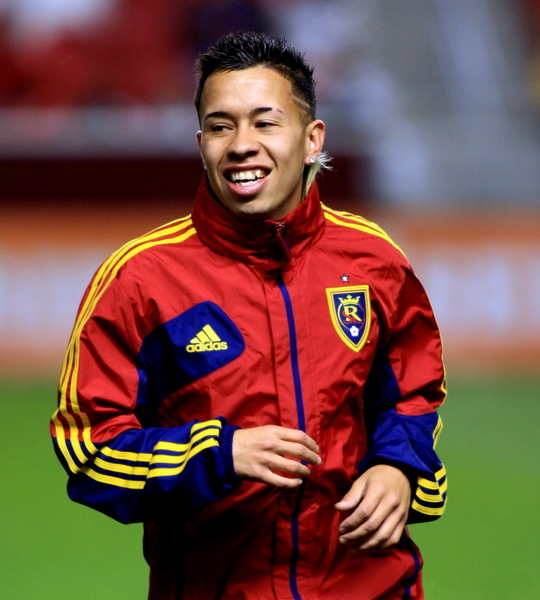
- Velásquez with Real Salt Lake in 2012

Personal information
- Full name: Sebastián Velásquez
- Date of birth: February 11, 1991 (age 35)
- Place of birth: Medellín, Colombia
- Height: 5 ft 6 in (1.68 m)
- Position: Midfielder

College career
| Years | Team | Apps | (Gls) |
| 2010–2011 | Spartanburg Methodist Pioneers | | |

Senior career*
| Years | Team | Apps | (Gls) |
| 2012–2014 | Real Salt Lake | 43 | (2) |
| 2015 | New York City FC | 12 | (0) |
| 2016 | Rayo OKC | 16 | (2) |
| 2017–2018 | Real Monarchs | 49 | (16) |
| 2019 | Suwon FC | 8 | (0) |
| 2019 | El Paso Locomotive | 16 | (5) |
| 2020 | Miami FC | 10 | (4) |
| 2020–2021 | Bnei Sakhnin | 12 | (2) |
| 2021–2022 | El Paso Locomotive | 25 | (2) |
| 2022–2023 | Hapoel Umm al-Fahm | 18 | (2) |
| 2023 | Memphis 901 | 1 | (0) |
| 2023 | Indy Eleven | 17 | (2) |
| 2024–2025 | Greenville Triumph | 21 | (3) |
- * Club domestic league appearances and goals as of 13:59, 1 November 2025 (UTC)

Sebastián Velásquez (born 11 February 1991) is a Colombian professional footballer who plays for the Lehigh Valley Spirits as a midfielder.

== Early life ==
Velásquez was born in the Colombian city of Medellín and moved to the United States at a young age, with his family settling in South Carolina. As a freshman in high school, he was instrumental in winning a state championship with Greenville High School (Greenville, SC), where they also finished the year ranked No. 1 in the nation by the NSCAA. At the club level, he played alongside future Real Salt Lake teammate Enzo Martinez, and they won a national championship in 2009. He then played at the junior college level for the Spartanburg Methodist Pioneers in Spartanburg, South Carolina.

== Career ==
Velásquez was selected 36th overall in the 2012 MLS SuperDraft by Real Salt Lake. On March 10, 2012, Velásquez made his professional debut in a start for Real Salt Lake against LA Galaxy. In the 73rd minute, he provided a cross that was turned into the net by Galaxy defender Sean Franklin and Real went on to win the game 3–1. On November 8, 2013, Velásquez scored his first MLS goal with a header during the second leg of the 2013 Western Conference semifinals against LA Galaxy.

In December 2014, he was traded to New York City FC in exchange for allocation money. Velásquez was named NYCFC soccer player of the month by the Third Rail Supporters Club in March 2015.

On January 15, 2016, Velásquez became the first player to be signed by NASL expansion side Rayo OKC.

He was also the first player to appear on the NYCFC Fan Podcast on April 1, 2016, a milestone for the podcast.

On January 16, 2019, Velásquez was announced as a new player for K League 2 team Suwon FC. This was Velásquez's first football experience outside the United States. After six months at Suwon, he announced in June 2019, that he had left the club and would return to the United States.

On June 9, 2023, USL Championship club Indy Eleven announced the signing of Velásquez from Memphis 901 FC ahead of the 2023 USL Championship season.

Velásquez was released by Indy Eleven on November 30, 2023, following the conclusion of the 2023 season.

In January 2024, Velásquez signed with USL League One club Greenville Triumph.

In 2026, Velásquez signed with MASL club Lehigh Valley Spirits for their inaugural season.

== Personal life ==
Velásquez was raised Catholic by his mother but left the Church in 2013 and joined another Christian denomination. His teammates nicknamed him the Colombian Lionel Messi. After a shooting at a Walmart in El Paso in 2019, he helped raise funds for a girls' youth soccer team that was outside the store at the time of the shooting and took time to meet the players afterward.
