= Taylor Peay =

American soccer player

Personal information
- Full name: Taylor Peay
- Date of birth: September 5, 1991 (age 35)
- Place of birth: Salt Lake City, Utah, United States
- Height: 1.90 m (6 ft 3 in)
- Position: Defender

Youth career
- Inter FC Premier 92
- 2009–2010: Real Salt Lake

College career
Years	Team	Apps	(Gls)
2010–2013	Washington Huskies		

Senior career*
Years	Team	Apps	(Gls)
2009	Ogden Outlaws	1	(0)
2011–2012	Seattle Sounders FC U-23	7	(0)
2013	North Sound SeaWolves	5	(0)
2014–2016	Portland Timbers	33	(0)
2014	→ Orange County Blues (loan)	14	(0)
2015–2016	→ Portland Timbers 2 (loan)	23	(0)
2017	Real Monarchs	20	(2)
2018	Real Salt Lake	11	(0)
2018	→ Real Monarchs (loan)	7	(0)
2019	Louisville City	21	(0)
2020	Real Monarchs	9	(2)
- * Club domestic league appearances and goals as of October 5, 2020

Taylor Peay (born September 5, 1991) is an American professional soccer player.

== Career ==
=== College and amateur ===
Peay spent his entire collegiate career at the University of Washington. On September 18, 2010, Peay scored his first collegiate goal for the Huskies in a 4–1 upset win over No. 15 Portland. He was one of two freshmen to appear in all 17 matches for the Huskies. In his sophomore year, Peay made 17 appearances and helped the Huskies record nine clean sheets. In 2012, he made 20 appearances and finished the year with one goal. In his final season with the Huskies, Peay made 22 appearances and scored six goals including a hat trick in a 4–1 victory over Santa Clara on September 3. He led the Huskies to their first Pac-12 title since 2000 scoring 9 goals and their first trip to the Elite Eight where they fell to no. 7 seed New Mexico. On September 13, 2013, Peay was named NSCAA First Team All-American. As well as a Mac Herman Trophy Finalist.

Peay also played in the USL Premier Development League with Ogden Outlaws, Seattle Sounders FC U-23 and North Sound SeaWolves.

=== Professional ===
On January 16, 2014, Peay was drafted in the first round of the 2014 MLS SuperDraft by the Portland Timbers. Later that year, he was loaned out to USL Pro club Orange County Blues FC. He made his professional debut on April 5 in 2–0 loss to Oklahoma City Energy FC. Peay went on to play a vital part in the 2015 MLS Cup run for the Portland Timbers. Peay then went abroad to Bodo Glimt where he spent a couple months after leaving Portland Timbers at the end of 2016.

Peay then signed with United Soccer League side Real Monarchs on March 23, 2017. Peay's option was not picked by the Monarchs at the end of the 2017 season as he was set to sign with Real Salt Lake.

On December 15, 2017, Peay signed for Real Salt Lake after they acquired his rights from Portland Timbers in exchange for a third round 2018 MLS SuperDraft pick.

On December 11, 2018, Peay signed for USL Championship side Louisville City ahead of their 2019 season.

On December 6, 2019, it was announced Peay would return to Real Monarchs for the 2020 season. His option was declined by Real Monarchs following the 2020 season as he was set to retire from professional soccer.

== Honors ==
=== Club ===
Portland Timbers
Real Salt Lake

- MLS Cup: 2015
- Western Conference (playoffs): 2015
- USL Eastern Conference Champion (Louisville City)
- USL Cup Finalist (Louisville City)
