= Ricardo Velazco =

American soccer player (born 1993)

Personal information
- Date of birth: 26 May 1993 (age 33)
- Place of birth: Casa Grande, Arizona, United States
- Height: 1.70 m (5 ft 7 in)
- Position: Forward

Team information
- Current team: Arizona Monsoon
- Number: 10

Youth career
- 2010–2012: Real Salt Lake AZ

College career
Years	Team	Apps	(Gls)
2012	Cal State San Bernardino Coyotes		
2013–2014	Louisville Cardinals		

Senior career*
Years	Team	Apps	(Gls)
2012–2014	FC Tucson	30	(11)
2015–2016	Real Monarchs	47	(10)
2016–2017	Real Salt Lake	9	(0)
2018	Isidro Metapán	11	(2)
2019	FC Arizona	0	(0)
2022	Valley United	9	(1)
2024–	Arizona Monsoon	4	(0)
- * Club domestic league appearances and goals as of 11 August 2024

Ricardo Velazco (born May 26, 1993) is an American professional soccer player who currently plays for Arizona Monsoon.

== Club career ==
=== Youth, college and amateur ===
Velazco spent two years with the Real Salt Lake AZ Academy before beginning his college career at Cal State San Bernardino. In his only season with the Coyotes, he made 14 appearances and tallied six goals and one assist. After his freshman year, he transferred to the University of Louisville. In his first year with the Cardinals, he made 20 appearances and recorded seven goals and nine assists on his way to being named First Team All-American Conference and First Team and First Team All-Midwest Region. In 2014, he made 22 appearances and recorded six goals and five assists.

Velazco also played in the Premier Development League with FC Tucson. He was named PDL Young (U21) Player of the Year and was selected to the All-League and All-Western Conference Teams in 2014.

=== Professional ===
On March 7, 2015, Velazco signed a professional contract with Real Monarchs SLC, a USL affiliate club of Real Salt Lake. He made his professional debut on March 23 in a 0–0 draw with LA Galaxy II. Fast forward several months, Velazco was rewarded with a first team contract after two outstanding seasons with the Real Monarchs and signed a professional contract with Real Salt Lake on September 6, 2016, making him the first ever player in Real Salt Lake History to move up through the ranks from the Real Salt Lake Academy to the Real Monarchs and finally to Real Salt Lake. On March 4, 2017, Velazco made his MLS debut while being subbed on against Toronto FC. On May 13, 2017, Ricardo made his first start for Real Salt Lake while playing against New England Revolution in Foxborough, Massachusetts. In total, Velazco played 9 games over the course of 254 minutes, while registering 5 shots and 1 shot on goal in the 2017 MLS season.

=== Isidro Metapán ===
Velazco signed with top flight Primera División side Isidro Metapán for the Clausura 2018 tournament. Velazco scored two goals in a 2–4 defeat against Municipal Limeño in the Estadio Jose Ramon Flores, in January 2018.

== Legal issue ==
Velazco was charged with unlawful sexual activity with a minor, a third-degree felony punishable by up to five years in prison. a year later, the district attorney announced that Velazco would plead guilty to the reduce charge of sexual battery. On April 16, 2018, Velazco was sentenced to 45 days in jail, 24 months of probation, and suspended fine of $2,500.
