= Real Monarchs =

American soccer team

- Full name: Real Monarchs SLC
- Founded: 2014 (12 years ago)
- Stadium: Zions Bank Stadium (Herriman, Utah)
- Capacity: 5,000
- Owner: Miller Sports + Entertainment (Gail Miller)
- Head Coach: Mark Lowry
- League: MLS Next Pro
- 2025: 4th, Western Conference; Playoffs: Conference Quarterfinals
- Website: www.realmonarchs.com
Home colors	Away colors

The Real Monarchs is a professional soccer club playing in MLS Next Pro, a third division league of American soccer. The team is an affiliate of the Major League Soccer (MLS) club Real Salt Lake. The Real Monarchs are based at the Real Salt Lake training facility in Herriman, Utah and play home games at Zions Bank Stadium. As with Real Salt Lake, the club is owned by Miller Sports + Entertainment.

== History ==
RSL Academy coach Freddy Juarez was named head coach on December 23, 2014. The Monarchs played the LA Galaxy II to a scoreless draw in their USL debut on March 22, 2015 in Carson, California.

The club announced on December 6, 2021, that it was joining the inaugural 21-team MLS Next Pro season starting in 2022.

On April 18, 2025, Miller Sports + Entertainment, led by former Utah Jazz owner Gail Miller, acquired the franchise as part of a $600 million deal that included Real Salt Lake.

== Players and staff ==
=== Current roster ===
As of February 25, 2026

No.	Pos.	Nation	Player
42	MF	GER	Felix Ewald
50	MF	CIV	Lionel Dijero
55	DF	USA	Gio Calderon
61	MF	USA	Izzy Amparo
64	DF	USA	Dylan Kropp
70	FW	BRA	Lineker Rodrigues dos Santos
75	DF	BEN	Loic Adjalala
76	MF	USA	Liam O'Gara
77	DF	USA	Ruben Mesalles
80	DF	GER	Michael Wentzel
84	DF	USA	Hayden Sargis (on loan from Athletic Club Boise)
88	DF	USA	Linkon Ream
91	FW	USA	Zack Lifferth
97	FW	GHA	Prince Abban
99	GK	USA	Trace Alphin
—	FW	SOM	Handwalla Bwana (on loan from Las Vegas Lights FC)

Signed to first team contract with Real Salt Lake.
Real Salt Lake Academy player.

=== Technical & coaching staff ===
Title	Name
General manager	Vacant
Assistant General manager	Tony Beltran
Head coach	Mark Lowry
Assistant coach	Jordan Allen
Assistant coach	Phil Cousins
Goalkeeping coach	Nick Rimando
Video analyst	Attillio Crimivaroli
Strength and Conditioning Coach	Laura Connahan
Head athletic trainer	Andrea Camacho
Head team physician	Stephen Kirk
Team administrator	
Logistics coordinator	Kasia Kampf
Kit man	James Waites

Last updated: March 11, 2021
Source: Real Monarchs

=== Head coaches ===
As of October 4, 2020

Real Monarchs Coaching Stats
Coach	Nation	Start	End	Games	Win	Loss	Tie	Win %
Freddy Juarez	(United States)	December 23, 2014	December 6, 2016	60	18	28	14	30.00%
Mike Petke	(United States)	December 22, 2016	March 29, 2017	1	1	0	0	100%
Mark Briggs	(England)	March 29, 2017	August 23, 2018	56	35	11	10	62.50%
Jámison Olave (interim)	(Colombia)	August 23, 2018	January 21, 2019	11	3	7	1	27.27%
Martín Vásquez	(United States)	January 21, 2019	July 1, 2019	15	6	6	3	40.00%
Jámison Olave (interim)	(Colombia)	July 1, 2019	November 20, 2019	23	14	4	5	60.87%
Jámison Olave	(Colombia)	November 20, 2019	present	100	25	66	9	29.50%

== Honors ==
- USL Championship Cup
  - Winners: 2019
- USL Regular Season
  - Winners: 2017
- Western Conference
  - Winners (Regular season): 2017
  - Winners (Playoffs): 2019
- Four Corners Cup
  - Winners: 2019

== All-time top goalscorers ==
- Players in **bold** are still active with Real Monarchs; includes all competitive matches.
- Includes regular season and playoffs.

As of November 12, 2019

Rank	Player	Nation	Years	Goals
1	Chandler Hoffman	(United States)	2017–2018	29
2	**Maikel Chang**	(Cuba)	2018–present	18
3	Douglas Martinez	(Honduras)	2019–2021	17
4	Sebastián Velásquez	(Colombia)	2017–2018	16
5	Jack Blake	(England)	2018–2020	13
6	Kalen Ryden	(United States)	2018–2020	9
6	Ricardo Velazco	(United States)	2015–2017	9
6	Max Rauhofer	(Uruguay)	2015	9
9	Charlie Adams	(England)	2016–2018	8
10	Daniel Haber	(Canada)	2017	7

== Record ==
Year	Division	League	Regular season W–L–T	Playoffs	U.S. Open Cup	Avg. attendance
2015	3	USL	7–13–8; 12th, Western	Did not qualify	Third Round	4,968
2016	3	USL	10–14–6; 11th, Western	Did not qualify	Not eligible (MLS reserve team)	2,528
2017	2	USL	19–5–6; 1st, Western	Conference Quarter-finals	Not eligible (MLS reserve team)	2,195
2018	2	USL	19–12–3; 4th, Western	Conference Quarter-finals	Not eligible (MLS reserve team)	1,731
2019	2	USLC	16–10–8; 4th, Western	Champions	Not eligible (MLS reserve team)	1,983
2020	2	USLC	3–11–2; 14th, Western; 4th, Group C	Did not qualify	Not eligible (MLS reserve team)	N/A
2021	2	USLC	5–20–7; 14th, Western	Did not qualify	Not eligible (MLS reserve team)	N/A
2022	3	MLSNP	6–14–4; 10th, Western	Did not qualify	Not eligible (MLS reserve team)	N/A
2023	3	MLSNP	8–15–5; 12th, Western	Did not qualify	Not eligible (MLS reserve team)	N/A

== Broadcasting ==
Starting in 2022, every Real Monarchs match is available via stream through MLS Next Pro on their website. In 2023, in conjunction with Major League Soccer, select matches are available via MLS Season Pass on the Apple TV app.
