= 2013 Orlando City SC season =

Orlando City
2013 season
- President: Phil Rawlins
- Manager: Adrian Heath
- Stadium: Fifth Third Bank Field
- USL Pro: 2nd
- USL Pro Playoffs: Champions
- U.S. Open Cup: QF
- WDW Pro Soccer Classic: 7th
- Top goalscorer: League: Dom Dwyer (15); All: Dom Dwyer (21)
- Highest home attendance: 10,697; August 11 v. Seattle Res. 20,886; September 7 v. Charlotte (Championship)
- Lowest home attendance: 6,187; June 9 v. Antigua
- Average home league attendance: 8,053
Home colors	Away colors	Third colors

The 2013 Orlando City Soccer Club season was the club's third season of existence in Orlando. Orlando finished second in the overall regular-season table. They were declared 2013 USL Pro Champions after beating Charlotte Eagles 7–4 in front of 20,886 fans at the Fifth Third Bank Field at the Citrus Bowl.

== Background ==
The first set of returning players was announced on November 7, 2012, including Jamie Watson, Miguel Gallardo, Rob Valentino, Anthony Pulis, Mechack Jérôme and Adama Mbengue. Notably not on the player list was captain Ian Fuller, who was only listed in the press release as "assistant head coach". He has been a player/coach the previous two seasons.

The biggest news regarding the fixture was the announcement of a home-and-away series of preseason friendlies with Tampa Bay Rowdies of the North American Soccer League. The teams will play on March 9 in Orlando, and March 30 in St. Petersburg. They could also potentially meet at the 2013 Walt Disney World Pro Soccer Classic.

In supporter news, the two largest supporters groups—The Ruckus, and the Iron Lion Firm—announced on November 18, 2012, that they were beginning discussions regarding the unification of the team's supporters groups.

Orlando City played a friendly against A.S. Roma of the Italian top-flight league Serie A on January 2, 2013. Roma was in town on a training visit to ESPN Wide World of Sports Complex. Roma won the match, 5–0.

As part of the alliance between Major League Soccer and the United Soccer Leagues, Orlando City agreed to become the USL Pro affiliate club of Sporting Kansas City. They were matched with Seattle Sounders FC, and will play home and away matches against their reserve squad in the 2013 season. The first loans made by Sporting Kansas City to Orlando City under the arrangement were forward Dom Dwyer, midfielder Christian Duke, defender Yann Songo'o and goalkeeper Jon Kempin.

On February 15, 2013, the team announced that Fifth Third Bank had purchased naming rights to the stadium for Orlando City matches. The Citrus Bowl will be called Fifth Third Bank Field at the Citrus Bowl during Orlando City matches.

== Competitions ==
=== Friendlies ===
The most important part of the preseason for Orlando City was a local derby with the 2012 North American Soccer League champion Tampa Bay Rowdies. It was the first meeting between minor-league professional soccer teams based in the Greater Orlando and Tampa Bay areas since 1990, when the Tampa Bay Rowdies and Orlando Lions played in the American Professional Soccer League.

The derby, referred to as the I-4 Derby after the road that connects the cities, was won by Orlando City, who took 3–2 victories in both matches, on March 9 in Orlando and March 30 in St. Petersburg. Additionally, the Lions also beat the Rowdies, 2–0, when they met in the 7th place game of the 2013 Walt Disney World Pro Soccer Classic on February 23.

January 2, 2013 Preseason	Orlando City	0–5	Roma	Winter Park, Florida
12:30pm EST		Report	Lamela 2', 13'; Pjanić 31'; Destro 45+1'; Florenzi 61'	Stadium: Cahall-Sandspur Field, Rollins College; Attendance: 700+

March 2, 2013 Preseason	Orlando City	3–0	FIU Panthers	Sanford, Florida
4:00pm EST	Watson 9'; Clark 45'; O'Connor (red card) 57'; Russo 73'			Stadium: Seminole Soccer Complex

March 13, 2013 Preseason	Orlando City	7–0	Stetson Hatters	Sanford, Florida
7:00pm EST	Braun 5'; Valentino 20'; Molino 53'; Mbengue 65'; Burke 69'; O'Connor 73'; Alexandre 74'			Stadium: Seminole Soccer Complex

March 16, 2013 Preseason	Orlando City	6–0	FGCU Eagles	Sanford, Florida
2:00pm EDT	Braun 15', 37'; Watson 17' (pen.); Dwyer 64'; Mendoza 67'; Russo 69'	Report		Stadium: Seminole Soccer Complex

March 21, 2013 Preseason	Rollins Tars	0–6	Orlando City	Winter Park, Florida
7pm EDT		Report	Burke 16'; Dwyer 21', 36', 55'; Mbengue 28' (pen.), 73'	Stadium: Cahall-Sandspur Field

March 25, 2013 Preseason	Orlando City	6–0	Tampa Spartans	Sanford, Florida
7:00pm EDT	Molino 20'; Dwyer 28' (pen.), 35', 42', 68'; Watson 35' (pen.)			Stadium: Seminole Soccer Complex

June 22, 2013 Friendly	Orlando City	3–4	Fluminense	Orlando, Florida
7:30pm EDT	Dwyer 19'; Pulis (yellow card) 42'; Mbengue 78'; Alexandre 80'	Report	Gum 40'; Rhayner 47'; Rafael 60'; Samuel 68'	Stadium: Fifth Third Bank Field; Attendance: 11,127

=== WDW Pro Soccer Classic ===
February 9, 2013 Group 1	Orlando City	1–1	Philadelphia Union	Lake Buena Vista, Florida
6:00pm EST	Chin 54'	Report(Orlando); Report(Philadelphia)	Fernandes 75'	Stadium: ESPN Wide World of Sports Complex; Attendance: 1,000+

February 13, 2012 Group 2	Orlando City	0–3	Toronto FC	Lake Buena Vista, Florida
8:00pm EST	Mbengue (red card) 74'	Report(Orlando); Report(Toronto)	Morgan 54'; Dunfield 73' (pen.); Osorio 87'	Stadium: ESPN Wide World of Sports Complex; Attendance: 824

February 16, 2013 Group 3	Orlando City	2–3	Columbus Crew	Lake Buena Vista, Florida
6:00pm EST	Watson 58'; Fekete 79'	Report(Orlando); Report(Columbus)	Viana 3'; Williams 74'; Higuaín 88' (pen.)	Stadium: ESPN Wide World of Sports Complex; Attendance: 957

February 23, 2013 C	Orlando City	2–0	Tampa Bay Rowdies	Lake Buena Vista, Florida
6:00pm EST	Watson 1' (pen.); Chin 76'	Report		Stadium: ESPN Wide World of Sports Complex; Attendance: 1,000+ Referee: Mark Geiner

=== I-4 Derby ===
March 9, 2013 Preseason	Orlando City	3–2	Tampa Bay Rowdies	Orlando, Florida
7:30pm EST	Watson 49'; O'Connor 58'; Alexandre 70'	Report(Orlando); Report (Tampa)	Walker 17'; Mulholland 75'	Stadium: Fifth Third Bank Field; Attendance: 6,877

March 30, 2013 Preseason	Tampa Bay Rowdies	2–3	Orlando City	St. Petersburg, Florida
7:30pm EDT	Yamada 41' (pen.); Walker 52'	Report(Orlando); Report(Tampa)	Molino 5'; Mbengue 32'; Dwyer 90+1'	Stadium: Al Lang Field

=== USL Pro ===
All times from this point on Eastern Daylight Time (UTC-04:00)

==== USL Pro regular season ====
===== Results summary =====
Overall								Home						Away					
Pld	W	D	L	GF	GA	GD	Pts	W	D	L	GF	GA	GD	W	D	L	GF	GA	GD
26	16	6	4	54	26	+28	54	12	0	2	36	13	+23	4	6	2	18	13	+5

Source: Match reports

Round	1	2	3	4	5	6	7	8	9	10	11	12	13	14	15	16	17	18	19	20	21	22	23	24	25	26
Stadium	A	A	H	H	A	H	H	H	A	A	A	H	H	H	H	A	A	H	A	A	H	H	A	H	A	H
Result	W	L	W	W	D	W	W	W	W	D	W	W	W	W	L	D	D	W	D	D	W	L	W	W	L	W

Updated to match(es) played on August 17, 2013. Source: Match reports
A = Away; H = Home; W = Win; D = Draw; L = Loss

===== Results =====
April 7, 2013 1	Phoenix FC	1–3	Orlando City	Tempe, Arizona
10:30pm	Weber (yellow card) 7'; Faria 16'; Hedrick (yellow card) 18'; Boufleur (yellow card) 55'	Report	Dwyer 35'; Tan 68'; Molino 87'	Stadium: Sun Devil Soccer Stadium, Arizona State University; Attendance: 2,329; Referee: Daniel Radford

April 10, 2013 2	Los Angeles Blues	1–0	Orlando City	Fullerton, California
8:00pm	Russell (yellow card) 27'; Gonzalez (yellow card) 76'; Turner (yellow card) 77'; Davis 80'	Report	Dwyer (yellow card) 45'	Stadium: Titan Stadium, Cal State-Fullerton; Attendance: 207; Referee: Reed Christy

April 14, 2013 3	Orlando City	3–1	Rochester Rhinos	Orlando, Florida
6:00pm	Tan 45+1'; Dwyer 47'; Watson 63'	Report	Luzunaris (yellow card) 22'; Duckett (yellow card) 39'; Polak (yellow card) 70'; Rosenlund (yellow card) 77'; Brettschneider 90'	Stadium: Fifth Third Bank Field; Attendance: 6,351; Referee: Jonathan Weiner

April 19, 2013 4	Orlando City	3–2	Los Angeles Blues	Orlando, Florida
7:30pm	Watson 56', 72' (pen.); Songo'o 62'	Report	Hearn 70'; Lopez 89' (pen.)	Stadium: Fifth Third Bank Field; Attendance: 9,140; Referee: Cedric Adams

April 23, 2013 5	Charlotte Eagles	1–1	Orlando City	Charlotte, North Carolina
7:00pm	Villasenor (yellow card) 5'; Okiomah (yellow card) 26'; Asante (yellow card) 45+'; Francis (yellow card) 72'; Newnam (yellow card) 74'; Thornton 90'	Report	Dwyer 8'; Braun (yellow card) 40'; Molino (yellow card) 45+'	Stadium: Queens University Stadium; Attendance: 486; Referee: Daniel Fitzgerald

April 27, 2013 6	Orlando City	4–0	Dayton Dutch Lions	Orlando, Florida
7:30pm	Chin 28'; Dwyer 34', 72'; Watson 39' (pen.)	Report	DeLass (yellow card) 47'	Stadium: Fifth Third Bank Field; Attendance: 9,589; Referee: Matthew Miscannon

April 30, 2013 7	Orlando City	postponed	VSI Tampa Bay FC	Orlando, Florida
7:30pm		severe weather		Stadium: Fifth Third Bank Field

May 4, 2013 8	Orlando City	7–2	Antigua Barracuda	Orlando, Florida
7:30pm	Dwyer 1', 17', 40'; Pulis 4'; Chin 12'; Dublin 49' (o.g.); Valentino 54'	Report	Burton (yellow card) 35'; Dublin (yellow card) 39'; Pyle 76'; Songo'o 89' (o.g.)	Stadium: Fifth Third Bank Field; Attendance: 6,580; Referee: Caleb Mendez

May 12, 2013 9	Seattle Sounders Reserves	0–2	Orlando City	Tacoma, Washington
7:00pm	Rose (yellow card) 57'	Report	Dwyer 4', 53'	Stadium: Cheney Stadium; Attendance: 2,174; Referee: Timon Berry

May 17, 2013 10	Harrisburg City Islanders	2–2	Orlando City	Harrisburg, Pennsylvania
7:00pm	Touray 16'; Pelletier (yellow card) 24'; Ekra 72'	Report	Dwyer 22', 55'	Stadium: Skyline Sports Complex; Attendance: 1,896; Referee: Alex Chilowicz

May 18, 2013 11	Rochester Rhinos	0–1	Orlando City	Rochester, New York
7:05pm	Roberts (yellow card) 57'; Nicht (yellow card) 85'	Report	Alexandre (yellow card) 25' (red card) 39'; Ustruck 85'	Stadium: Sahlen's Stadium; Attendance: 5,279; Referee: Chris Penso

May 25, 2013 12	Orlando City	4–1	Wilmington Hammerheads	Orlando, Florida
7:30pm	Dwyer 25'; Watson 40'; Burke 52'; Songo'o (yellow card) 58'; Valentino 88'	Report	Daly (yellow card) 33'; Parratt (yellow card) 55'; Steres (yellow card) 63'; Nicholson 69'; Wallace (yellow card) 90'	Stadium: Fifth Third Bank Field; Attendance: 8,394

June 7, 2013 13	Orlando City	2–0	Phoenix FC	Orlando, Florida
7:30pm	Watson 29' (pen.); Dwyer 31'	Report	Grousis (yellow card) 43'; Schafer (yellow card) 80'	Stadium: Fifth Third Bank Field; Attendance: 7,466; Referee: Cedric Adams

June 9, 2013 14	Orlando City	2–0	Antigua Barracuda	Orlando, Florida
7:30pm	Watson 87' (pen.); Dwyer 90'	Report	Kirwan (yellow card) 68'	Stadium: Fifth Third Bank Field; Attendance: 6,187; Referee: Lance Jacob Vanhaitsma

June 29, 2013 15	Orlando City	0–2	Richmond Kickers	Orlando, Florida
7:30pm		Report	Seaton 57'; Ownby 78'	Stadium: Fifth Third Bank Field; Attendance: 8,842; Referee: Patrick O'Brian

July 3, 2013 16	Wilmington Hammerheads	2–2	Orlando City	Wilmington, North Carolina
7:30pm	Steres 8', 80'	Report	Watson 66'; Evans 77' (o.g.)	Stadium: Legion Stadium; Attendance: 5,017; Referee: Daniel Burak

July 5, 2013 17	Charleston Battery	1–1	Orlando City	Charleston, South Carolina
7:30pm	Cordovéz 90'	Report	Valentino 57'; Mbengue (red card) 63'	Stadium: Blackbaud Stadium; Attendance: 4,387; Referee: Patrick Baker

July 11, 2013 18	Orlando City	2–1	Charleston Battery	Orlando, Florida
7:30pm	Watson 29', 70' (pen.)	Report	Cuevas 55'	Stadium: Fifth Third Bank Field; Attendance: 8,729; Referee: Cedric Adams

July 14, 2013 19	Dayton Dutch Lions	3–3	Orlando City	Dayton, Ohio
6:30pm	Harada 35'; Delass 59' (pen.); Swartzendruber 88'	Report	Chin 24'; Boufleur 43'; Sapong 66'	Stadium: Miami Valley Middle School Stadium; Attendance: 810; Referee: Cory Richardson

July 17, 2013 20	Pittsburgh Riverhounds	0–0	Orlando City	Pittsburgh, Pennsylvania
7:00pm	Motagalvan (yellow card) 25'; Angulo (penalty missed) 37'	Report		Stadium: Highmark Stadium; Referee: Kevin Terry, Jr.

July 20, 2013 21	Orlando City	3–1	Harrisburg City Islanders	Orlando, Florida
7:30pm	Alexandre 25', 36'; Chin 71'	Report	Mkosana 79'	Stadium: Fifth Third Bank Field; Attendance: 7,311; Referee: D. Dellavia

August 3, 2013 22	Orlando City	0–1	Pittsburgh Riverhounds	Orlando, Florida
7:30pm		Report	Linne 52'	Stadium: Fifth Third Bank Field; Attendance: 7,252; Referee: Lance Vantlaitsma

August 4, 2013 23	VSI Tampa Bay FC	0–3	Orlando City	Plant City, Florida
7:00pm		Report	Duke 16'; Valentino 45'; Braun 51'	Stadium: Plant City Stadium; Attendance: 594; Referee: Kristen Salazar

August 7, 2013 7R	Orlando City	3–2	VSI Tampa Bay FC	Orlando, Florida
7:30pm	Boufleur 32'; Roberts 51' (o.g.); Valentino 80'	Report	Burt 26'; S. Chin 69'	Stadium: Fifth Third Bank Field; Attendance: 5,985; Referee: Marcos DeOliveira

August 11, 2013 24	Orlando City	2–0	Seattle Sounders Reserves	Orlando, Florida
7:30pm	Molino 1'; Pulis (yellow card) 21'; Valentino 30'	Report	Carrasco (yellow card) 22'; Burch (yellow card) 88'	Stadium: Fifth Third Bank Field; Attendance: 10,697; Referee: Donal Dellavia

August 14, 2013 25	Richmond Kickers	2–0	Orlando City	Richmond, Virginia
7:00pm	Delicate 24', 29'	Report		Stadium: City Stadium; Attendance: 4,921; Referee: Charles Carson

August 17, 2013 26	Orlando City	1–0	Charlotte Eagles	Orlando, Florida
7:30pm	Braun 50'	Report		Stadium: Fifth Third Bank Field at the Citrus Bowl. Attendance: 10,215

===== Standings =====
Pos	Team	Pld	W	T	L	GF	GA	GD	Pts	Qualification
1	Richmond Kickers (C)	26	15	10	1	51	24	+27	55	Commissioner's Cup, Playoffs
2	Orlando City (A)	26	16	6	4	54	26	+28	54	Playoffs
3	Charleston Battery (A)	26	13	6	7	48	29	+19	45	Playoffs
4	Harrisburg City Islanders (A)	26	14	2	10	55	39	+16	44	Playoffs
5	Charlotte Eagles (A)	26	10	11	5	44	39	+5	41	Playoffs

Source: USL Pro official standings
Rules for classification: 1) points; 2) goal difference; 3) number of goals scored.
(A) Advances to USL Pro Playoffs; (C) Commissioner's Cup (best regular season record)

==== USL Pro Playoffs ====
August 24, 2013 QF	Orlando City	5–0	Pittsburgh Riverhounds	Orlando, Florida
7:30pm	Tan 2', 48'; Boufleur 5'; Boden (yellow card) 53'; Chin 68'; Pulis 79' (pen.)	Report	Marshall (yellow card) 4'	Stadium: Fifth Third Bank Field; Attendance: 8,486; Referee: Caleb Mendez

August 30, 2013 SF	Orlando City	3–2	Charleston Battery	Orlando, Florida
7:30pm	Tan 4' (red card) 73'; Mbemgue 5'; Chin 19'	Report	Azira 33'; Sanyang 60'; Falvey (red card) 73'	Stadium: Fifth Third Bank Field; Attendance: 8,912; Referee: Jose Carlos Rivera

September 7, 2013 Final	Orlando City	7–4	Charlotte Eagles	Orlando, Florida
7:30pm	Dwyer 33', 42', 61' (pen.), 69'; Chin 70', 90'; Boden (yellow card) 71'; Mbengue 85'	Report	Okiomah 20'; Ramirez 43', 58'; Meza 88'	Stadium: Fifth Third Bank Field; Attendance: 20,886; Referee: Ismail Elfath

=== U.S. Open Cup ===
Qualification for the U.S. Open Cup began in November 2012 in the fifth tier. The format will be similar to the 2012 tournament, but with the two lowest-ranked USL Pro teams and two expansion USL Pro teams starting in the first round, and the remaining USL Pro teams (including Orlando City and NASL teams entering in the second round. On June 12, Orlando City reached the Quarterfinals, the farthest round ever reached in team history and the farthest USL Pro team in 2013, guaranteeing a $15,000 prize.

May 21, 2013 2nd Round	Ocala Stampede (Florida)	1–2	(Florida) Orlando City	Ocala, Florida
7:00 PM EDT	Blandon 58'; Duininck (yellow card) 87'	Report	Dwyer 27'; Mbengue (yellow card) 37' (goal) 50'; Braun (yellow card) 77'; Ustruck (yellow card) 90'	Stadium: Forest High School Stadium; Attendance: 1,030

May 28, 2013 3rd Round	Orlando City (Florida)	3–1	Colorado Rapids	Orlando, Florida
7:30 PM EDT	Burke 4'; Pulis (yellow card) 32'; Dwyer 48', 63'; Mbengue (yellow card) 65'	Report	Hill 18'; O'Neill (yellow card) 36'; Ceus (red card) 56'; Harris (yellow card) 80'	Stadium: Fifth Third Bank Field; Attendance: 4,128

June 12, 2013 4th round	Sporting Kansas City	0–1	(Florida) Orlando City	Kansas City, Kansas
8:30 PM EDT		Report	Tan 2'; Pulis (yellow card) 71'	Stadium: Sporting Park; Attendance: 15,981; Referee: Tyler Ploeger

June 26, 2013 Quarterfinals	Chicago Fire (Illinois)	5–1	(Florida) Orlando City	Bridgeview, Illinois
8:30 PM CDT				Stadium: Toyota Park

== Club ==
=== Roster ===
Players which have been announced as re-signed with Orlando or for which Orlando exercised an option to retain.

No.	Position	Nation	Player
1	GK	MEX	Miguel Gallardo
3	MF	USA	Jonathan Mendoza
4	MF	USA	Ian Fuller (captain)
5	DF	JAM	Kieron Bernard (Retired as of May 30)
6	MF	WAL	Anthony Pulis
7	MF	USA	Bryan Burke
8	DF	USA	Erik Ustruck
10	MF	SEN	Adama Mbengue
12	MF	USA	Christian Duke
13	DF	USA	Justin Clark
14	MF	ENG	Luke Boden
15	FW	USA	Dennis Chin
16	MF	USA	Freddie Braun
17	MF	IRL	James O'Connor
18	MF	TTO	Kevin Molino
20	MF	HAI	Jean Alexandre
21	GK	USA	Jon Kempin
22	DF	USA	Rob Valentino
23	FW	CHN	Long Tan
24	DF	USA	Brian Fekete
25	DF	SEN	Oumar Diakhite
28	FW	USA	C. J. Sapong
29	DF	USA	Kevin Ellis
30	GK	USA	Sean Kelley
77	FW	USA	Jamie Watson

=== Squad information ===
No.	Nat.	Player	Birthday	Previous club	2013 USL Pro appearances	2013 USL Pro goals
Goalkeepers
1	(Mexico)	Miguel Gallardo	October 24, 1984 (age 42)	(United States) Austin Lightning*	15	–
21	(United States)	Jon Kempin	April 8, 1993 (age 33)	(United States) Sporting Kansas City†	9	–
30	(United States)	Sean Kelley	April 18, 1988 (age 38)	(United States) Northern Virginia Royals*	5	–
Defenders
2	(Cameroon)	Yann Songo'o	November 19, 1991 (age 34)	(United States) Sporting Kansas City†	12	2
5	(Jamaica)	Kieron Bernard‡	August 2, 1985 (age 41)	(United States) Austin Aztex U23*	0	0
5	(Brazil)	Renan Boufleur‡	January 4, 1990 (age 36)	(United States) Phoenix FC	13	2
7	(United States)	Bryan Burke	January 3, 1989 (age 37)	(United States) Los Angeles Blues*	16	1
8	(United States)	Erik Ustruck	January 4, 1985 (age 41)	(United States) FC Tampa Bay	12	1
13	(United States)	Justin Clark	October 17, 1988 (age 38)	(United States) Rollins College	6	–
14	(England)	Luke Boden	November 26, 1988 (age 37)	(England) Sheffield Wednesday F.C.	24	–
22	(United States)	Rob Valentino	December 21, 1985 (age 40)	(United States) Tampa Bay Rowdies	24	5
24	(United States)	Brian Fekete	April 26, 1991 (age 35)	(United States) GPS Portland Phoenix	7	–
25	(Senegal)	Oumar Diakhite	December 9, 1993 (age 32)	(United States) Orlando City U-23	1	–
29	(United States)	Kevin Ellis	June 30, 1991 (age 35)	(United States) Sporting Kansas City†	4	–
Midfielders
3	(United States)	Jonathan Mendoza	January 26, 1990 (age 36)	(United States) Orlando City U-23	17	–
4	(United States)	Ian Fuller	August 31, 1979 (age 47)	(United States) Charleston Battery*	8	–
6	(Wales)	Anthony Pulis	July 21, 1984 (age 42)	(England) Aldershot Town F.C.	17	1
10	(Senegal)	Adama Mbengue	December 1, 1993 (age 32)	(United States) Orlando City U-23	14	–
12	(United States)	Christian Duke	June 5, 1991 (age 35)	(United States) Sporting Kansas City†	20	1
16	(United States)	Freddie Braun	May 13, 1988 (age 38)	(United States) Portland Timbers	20	2
17	(Republic of Ireland)	James O'Connor	September 1, 1979 (age 47)	(England) Sheffield Wednesday F.C.	19	–
18	(Trinidad and Tobago)	Kevin Molino	June 17, 1990 (age 36)	(Trinidad and Tobago) Ma Pau SC	16	2
20	(Haiti)	Jean Alexandre	August 24, 1986 (age 40)	(United States) San Jose Earthquakes	10	2
Forwards
9	(England)	Dom Dwyer	July 30, 1990 (age 36)	(United States) Sporting Kansas City†	13	15
15	(United States)	Dennis Chin	June 4, 1987 (age 39)	(United States) Central Florida Kraze	25	4
23	(China)	Long Tan	April 1, 1988 (age 38)	(United States) D.C. United	23	2
28	(United States)	C. J. Sapong	December 27, 1988 (age 37)	(United States) Sporting Kansas City†	5	1
77	(United States)	Jamie Watson	April 10, 1986 (age 40)	(United States) Wilmington Hammerheads*	20	10

* = Denotes players who were retained after the move of the Austin Aztex FC organization to form Orlando City S.C.
† = Denotes players on loan through USL Pro-MLS Reserve League alliance
‡ = Retired as of May 30

== Transfers ==
=== Out ===
- (England) John Rooney was signed by Barnsley F.C. on a free transfer after his contract with Orlando City for the 2012 season expired. There was a slight delay because of some concern that he was still under contract on 31 August.
- (Haiti) Mechack Jérôme was transferred to Sporting Kansas City on February 28.

=== Loan in ===
- (Cameroon) Yann Songo'o, on loan from Sporting Kansas City via the USL Pro-MLS Reserve League alliance Songo'o departed the team on June 28, 2013, when Sporting Kansas City released him from his contract.
- (England) Dom Dwyer, on loan from Sporting Kansas City via the USL Pro-MLS Reserve League alliance Dwyer was recalled on June 27, 2013. Sporting Kansas City loaned Dwyer back for the 2013 USL Pro Championship.
- (United States) Christian Duke, on loan from Sporting Kansas City via the USL Pro-MLS Reserve League alliance
- (United States) Jon Kempin, on loan from Sporting Kansas City via the USL Pro-MLS Reserve League alliance
- (Brazil) Renan Boufleur, on loan from Phoenix FC
- (United States) C. J. Sapong, on loan from Sporting Kansas City via the USL Pro-MLS Reserve League alliance
- (United States) Kevin Ellis, on loan from Sporting Kansas City via the USL Pro-MLS Reserve League alliance Ellis was briefly recalled by Sporting for a single match on July 12, then returned to Orlando.

== Media ==
For the 2013 season, all matches will stream live on the USL Nation website using the stadium feed. Occasional matches will appear on Bright House Sports Network, with USL Nation using that feed when available. Some home matches can be heard on the radio as well, either 740 the Game or 102.5/107.7-HD2 WLOQ.

== See also ==
- 2013 in American soccer
- 2013 USL Pro season
- Orlando City
