= List of USL Pro transfers 2013 =

The following is a list of transfers for the teams of the USL Pro league, the third level of the United States soccer pyramid, for the 2013 season. The transactions begin at the conclusion of the 2012 USL Pro season and end after the championship match of the 2013 season. The first signing of the season was former Aberdeen FC striker Darren Mackie who joined expansion side Phoenix FC. New players who are listed on a club's official roster but no official announcement was made appear at the end of the list.

== Transfers ==
Date	Name	Last Club	Moving to	Mode of Transfer	Reference
September 28, 2012	(Scotland) Darren Mackie	(Scotland) Aberdeen FC	Phoenix FC	Free	
October 31, 2012	(Brazil) Diego Faria	(Brazil) America T.O.	Phoenix FC	Free	
October 31, 2012	Devon Grousis	Charlotte Eagles	Phoenix FC	Free	
November 19, 2012	Aaron King	FC Tampa Bay	Phoenix FC	Free	
November 19, 2012	Reid Schmitt	FC Tucson	Phoenix FC	Free	
December 19, 2012	(Haiti) Bitielo Jean Jacques	Ocala Stampede	VSI Tampa Bay	Free	
December 29, 2012	Kyle Hoffer	Charleston Battery	VSI Tampa Bay	Free	
January 7, 2012	(Antigua and Barbuda) Akeem Thomas	(Antigua and Barbuda) Antigua Barracuda FC	(Trinidad and Tobago) Caledonia AIA	Free	
January 7, 2012	(Antigua and Barbuda) Elvis Thomas	(Antigua and Barbuda) Antigua Barracuda FC	(Trinidad and Tobago) Caledonia AIA	Free	
January 8, 2013	Bryan Burke	Los Angeles Blues	Orlando City SC	Free	
January 9, 2013	(Antigua and Barbuda) Peter Byers	(Antigua and Barbuda) Antigua Barracuda FC	(Trinidad and Tobago) Central FC	Free	
January 13, 2013	Alex Horwath	Wilmington Hammerheads	VSI Tampa Bay	Free	
January 28, 2013	(Jamaica) Richard Dixon	Mississippi Brilla	VSI Tampa Bay	Free	
January 29, 2013	Jarod Stigall	IMG Academy	VSI Tampa Bay	Free	
January 30, 2013	Sébastien Thurière	VSI Tampa Bay FC (PDL)	VSI Tampa Bay	Free	
February 5, 2013	Shawn Chin	Minnesota Stars	VSI Tampa Bay	Free	
February 5, 2013	(The Gambia) Karamba Janneh	Ocala Stampede	VSI Tampa Bay	Free	
February 5, 2013	(England) Jamie McGuinness	VSI Tampa Bay FC (PDL)	VSI Tampa Bay	Free	
February 5, 2013	(Brazil) Renan Boufleur	(Belgium) Saint-Gilloise	Phoenix FC	Free	
February 5, 2013	(Cameroon) Cyprian Hedrick	Sporting Kansas City	Phoenix FC	Free	
February 5, 2013	(Scotland) Scott Morrison	(Scotland) Ross County	Phoenix FC	Free	
February 5, 2013	(Brazil) Netinho	(Brazil) Santos FC	Phoenix FC	Free	
February 5, 2013	(Ghana) Anthony Obodai	(Northern Cyprus) Mağusa Türk Gücü	Phoenix FC	Free	
February 6, 2013	Brian Holmes	Unattached	Phoenix FC	Free	
February 6, 2013	Jimmy Lara	Unattached	Phoenix FC	Free	
February 6, 2013	(Mexico) José Ramos	Unattached	Phoenix FC	Free	
February 6, 2013	Thomas Ramos	Unattached	Phoenix FC	Free	
February 6, 2013	Humberto Soriano	Unattached	Phoenix FC	Free	
February 7, 2013	(China) Long Tan	D.C. United	Orlando City SC	Free	
February 12, 2013	Joshua Bento do O	Unattached	Phoenix FC	Free	
February 12, 2013	(Jamaica) Sheldon Parkinson	New York Red Bulls NPSL	Phoenix FC	Free	
February 12, 2013	Mason Robertson	Unattached	Phoenix FC	Free	
February 12, 2013	Donny Toia	FC Tucson	Phoenix FC	Free	
February 12, 2013	Anthony Tokpah	Unattached	Phoenix FC	Free	
February 12, 2013	Andrew Weber	Seattle Sounders FC	Phoenix FC	Free	
February 12, 2013	Elliot Weber	Phoenix College	Phoenix FC	Free	
February 12, 2013	(Lebanon) Joseph Haboush	VCU	Richmond Kickers	Free	
February 13, 2013	Ryan Kinne	Connecticut FC Azul	Pittsburgh Riverhounds	Free	
February 13, 2013	Alfonso Motagalvan	Fort Lauderdale Strikers	Pittsburgh Riverhounds	Free	
February 13, 2013	Mike Seamon	Seattle Sounders FC	Pittsburgh Riverhounds	Free	
February 13, 2013	Matt Luzunaris	Orlando City SC	Rochester Rhinos	Free	
February 14, 2013	Matt Gold	San Antonio Scorpions	Charlotte Eagles	Free	
February 15, 2013	Drew Yates	Harrisburg City Islanders	Charlotte Eagles	Free	
February 21, 2013	Blake Brettschneider	New England Revolution	Rochester Rhinos	Free	
February 22, 2013	(Colombia) Jhonny Arteaga	New York Red Bulls	Pittsburgh Riverhounds	Free	
February 26, 2013	Troy Cole	Wilmington Hammerheads	VSI Tampa Bay	Free	
February 26, 2013	James Turner	UC Irvine Anteaters	Los Angeles Blues	Free	
February 28, 2013	Christian Ramirez	Concordia University–Irvine	Charlotte Eagles	Free	
February 28, 2013	Will Prado	Concordia University–Irvine	Charlotte Eagles	Free	
February 28, 2013	(Haiti) Mechack Jérôme	Orlando City SC	Sporting Kansas City	Undisclosed	
February 28, 2013	(Sierra Leone) Sallieu Bundu	(Azerbaijan) Ravan Baku FC	VSI Tampa Bay	Free	
February 28, 2013	Charley Pettys	Orange County Blue Star	LA Blues	Free	
February 28, 2013	Jimmy Turner	Orange County Blue Star	LA Blues	Free	
March 1, 2013	(Colombia) Jonathan Mendoza	Orlando City U-23	Orlando City SC	Free	
March 1, 2013	Brian Fekete	GPS Portland Phoenix	Orlando City SC	Free	
March 5, 2013	(Haiti) Jean Alexandre	San Jose Earthquakes	Orlando City SC	Free	
March 5, 2013	Matt Kassel	Pittsburgh Riverhounds	Philadelphia Union	Undisclosed	
March 5, 2013	Alex Lee	FC Dallas	Richmond Kickers	Free	
March 6, 2013	Ben Newnam	Wake Forest Demon Deacons	Charlotte Eagles	Free	
March 6, 2013	Fejiro Okiomah	Carolina Dynamo	Charlotte Eagles	Free	
March 6, 2013	Andrew Marshall	Harrisburg City Islanders	Pittsburgh Riverhounds	Free	
March 6, 2013	(Puerto Rico) Anthony Vázquez	Puerto Rico Islanders	Pittsburgh Riverhounds	Free	
March 8, 2013	Freddie Braun	Portland Timbers	Orlando City SC	Free	
March 8, 2013	Jamel Wallace	Richmond Kickers	Wilmington Hammerheads	Free	
March 13, 2013	Peabo Doue	WVU	Phoenix FC	Free	
March 13, 2013	Cameron Vickers	Portland Timbers U23s	Phoenix FC	Free	
March 14, 2013	Christian Duke	Sporting Kansas City	Orlando City SC	Loan	
March 14, 2013	(England) Dom Dwyer	Sporting Kansas City	Orlando City SC	Loan	
March 14, 2013	Jon Kempin	Sporting Kansas City	Orlando City SC	Loan	
March 14, 2013	(Cameroon) Yann Songo'o	Sporting Kansas City	Orlando City SC	Loan	
March 14, 2013	Ross LaBauex	Colorado Rapids	Rochester Rhinos	Free	
March 15, 2013	(Colombia) Juan Arbelaez	VCU	Richmond Kickers	Free	
March 15, 2013	Josh Rife	Charlotte Eagles	VSI Tampa Bay	Free	
March 18, 2013	(Ukraine) Andriy Budnyy	Wilmington Hammerheads	VSI Tampa Bay	Free	
March 18, 2013	(Trinidad and Tobago) Darren Toby	Charlotte Eagles	VSI Tampa Bay	Free	
March 19, 2013	Taylor Kemp	D.C. United	Richmond Kickers	Loan	
March 19, 2013	(Jamaica) Michael Seaton	D.C. United	Richmond Kickers	Loan	
March 19, 2013	Conor Shanosky	D.C. United	Richmond Kickers	Loan	
March 19, 2013	Casey Townsend	D.C. United	Richmond Kickers	Loan	
March 19, 2013	Tony Donatelli	Charleston Battery	VSI Tampa Bay	Free	
March 21, 2013	J. T. Noone	Harrisburg City Islanders	VSI Tampa Bay	Free	
March 21, 2013	Jarad vanSchaik	Puerto Rico Islanders	Charleston Battery	Free	
March 22, 2013	Rodrigo López	Orlando City	LA Blues	Free	
March 22, 2013	Brian Ownby	Houston Dynamo	Richmond Kickers	Loan	
March 25, 2013	Ryan Richter	Charleston Battery	(Canada) Toronto FC	Undisclosed	
March 25, 2013	(Mexico) Cristhian Hernandez	Philadelphia Union	Harrisburg City Islanders	Loan	
March 25, 2013	Greg Jordan	Philadelphia Union	Harrisburg City Islanders	Loan	
March 25, 2013	Jimmy McLaughlin	Philadelphia Union	Harrisburg City Islanders	Loan	
March 25, 2013	Josh Faga	Marist College	Rochester Rhinos	Free	
March 25, 2013	Mike Reidy	Colgate University	Rochester Rhinos	Free	
March 25, 2013	(Brazil) Mauricio Salles	Charlotte Eagles	VSI Tampa Bay	Free	
March 27, 2013	Joe Broekhuizen	Calvin College	Dayton Dutch Lions	Free	
March 27, 2013	Ryan Grothaus	Northern Kentucky University	Dayton Dutch Lions	Free	
March 27, 2013	Joey Madigan	Real Colorado Foxes	Dayton Dutch Lions	Free	
March 27, 2013	(Senegal) Nago Mbengue	Southern West Virginia King's Warriors	Dayton Dutch Lions	Free	
March 27, 2013	(Netherlands) Wichert de Wit	(Netherlands) Drachster Boys	Dayton Dutch Lions	Free	
March 27, 2013	Bilal Duckett	New England Revolution	Rochester Rhinos	Loan	
March 27, 2013	Matt Horth	New England Revolution	Rochester Rhinos	Loan	
March 27, 2013	Gabe Latigue	New England Revolution	Rochester Rhinos	Loan	
March 27, 2013	Tyler Polak	New England Revolution	Rochester Rhinos	Loan	
March 28, 2013	(Jamaica) Shaun Francis	Columbus Crew	Charlotte Eagles	Free	
March 29, 2013	(Cuba) Maikel Chang	(Cuba) Ciudad de La Habana	Charleston Battery	Free	
March 29, 2013	(Cuba) Odisnel Cooper	(Cuba) FC Camagüey	Charleston Battery	Free	
March 29, 2013	(Cuba) Evier Cordovéz	(Cuba) Ciudad de La Habana	Charleston Battery	Free	
April 3, 2013	Shawn Ferguson	College of Charleston	Charleston Battery	Free	
April 3, 2013	Austin Savage	Clemson University	Charleston Battery	Free	
April 3, 2013	(Colombia) José Angulo	New York Red Bulls	Pittsburgh Riverhounds	Free	
April 3, 2013	(Scotland) Kevin Kerr	(Germany) SC Wiedenbrück 2000	Pittsburgh Riverhounds	Free	
April 3, 2013	Andrew Dykstra	D.C. United	Richmond Kickers	Loan	
April 5, 2013	(Senegal) Oumar Diakhite	Orlando City U-23	Orlando City SC	Free	
April 5, 2013	Nate Robinson	Michigan Bucks	Richmond Kickers	Free	
April 5, 2013	Ryan Taylor	FC Richmond	Richmond Kickers	Free	
April 10, 2013	(Japan) Shintaro Harada	Pittsburgh Riverhounds	Dayton Dutch Lions	Free	
April 10, 2013	(Georgia (country)) Irakli Khutsidze	(Georgia (country)) FC Gagra	Dayton Dutch Lions	Free	
April 10, 2013	Brandon Swartzendruber	(Canada) Thunder Bay Chill	Dayton Dutch Lions	Free	
April 10, 2013	(Netherlands) Glenn Visser	(Netherlands) FC Dordrecht	Dayton Dutch Lions	Free	
April 10, 2013	Don Anding	Philadelphia Union	Harrisburg City Islanders	Loan	
April 10, 2013	Coady Andrews	Missouri Comets	Harrisburg City Islanders	Free	
April 10, 2013	Matt Bahner	Cincinnati Bearcats	Harrisburg City Islanders	Free	
April 10, 2013	Jamiel Hardware	(Sweden) Motala AIF	Harrisburg City Islanders	Free	
April 10, 2013	(Trinidad and Tobago) Damani Richards	Philadelphia Union	Harrisburg City Islanders	Free	
April 11, 2013	(Zimbabwe) Joseph Ngwenya	D.C. United	Richmond Kickers	Free	
April 12, 2013	(England) Will Heaney	(Scotland) Gretna FC	Wilmington Hammerheads	Free	
April 12, 2013	(England) Arron Patrick	Bethel College	Wilmington Hammerheads	Free	
April 12, 2013	(Jamaica) Rohan Reid	(Jamaica) Arnett Gardens	Charlotte Eagles	Free	
April 12, 2013	(Antigua and Barbuda) Stefan Smith	(Antigua and Barbuda) Antigua Barracuda	Charlotte Eagles	Free	
April 12, 2013	(Antigua and Barbuda) Quinton Griffith	(Antigua and Barbuda) Antigua Barracuda	Charleston Battery	Free	
April 16, 2013	(Jamaica) Mitchily Waul	(Jamaica) Tivoli Gardens	Charlotte Eagles	Free	
	(Canada) Ben Fisk-Routledge	(Canada) Vancouver Whitecaps FC U-23	Charleston Battery	Free	
	Brock Duckworth	Charleston Battery	Charlotte Eagles	Free	
	(Ghana) Stephen Okai	Mobile Rams	Charlotte Eagles	Free	
	(Brazil) Daniel Vincente Horst	(Brazil) Botafogo Futebol Clube (SP)	Dayton Dutch Lions	Free	
April 18, 2013	Andrew Ribeiro	Portland Timbers U23s	Harrisburg City Islanders	Free	
April 20, 2013	(Netherlands) Tjeerd Westdijk	(Netherlands) HBS Craeyenhout	Dayton Dutch Lions	Free	
April 21, 2013	(Netherlands) Remco Klaasse	(Netherlands) HBS Craeyenhout	Dayton Dutch Lions	Free	
April 26, 2013	(Colombia) Jorge Herrera	(Colombia) Atlético Huila	Charlotte Eagles	Free	
April 29, 2013	Isaiah Schafer	Real Colorado Foxes	Phoenix FC	Free	
April 30, 2013	(Canada) Bryce Alderson	Vancouver Whitecaps FC	Charleston Battery	Loan	
May 1, 2013	Brayton Knapp	Rochester Lancers	Rochester Rhinos	Free	
May 3, 2013	(Brazil) Leo Fernandes	Philadelphia Union	Harrisburg City Islanders	Free	
May 15, 2013	(Antigua and Barbuda) Mervyn Hazelwood	(Antigua and Barbuda) Virgin Holidays Fort Road	(Antigua and Barbuda) Antigua Barracuda FC	Free	
May 24, 2013	(Cuba) Erlys García	Unattached	Los Angeles Blues	Free	
May 28, 2013	(Canada) Evan Harding	Unattached	Charlotte Eagles	Free	
May 29, 2013	Aaron Horton	Columbus Crew	Los Angeles Blues	Free	
May 31, 2013	(Iran) Mohammad Mohammadi	(Iran) Rah Ahan FC	Los Angeles Blues	Free	
June 14, 2013	Andrew Hoxie	Wichita Wings	Rochester Rhinos	Free	
June 27, 2013	(England) Dom Dwyer	Orlando City SC	Sporting Kansas City	Recall	
	(Brazil) Renan Boufleur	Phoenix FC	Orlando City SC	Loan	
