= 2013 USL Pro season =

27th season of third-division soccer league in the United States

USL Pro
- Season: 2013
- Champions: Orlando City (2nd Title)
- Commissioner's Cup: Richmond Kickers (1st Title)
- Matches: 182
- Goals: 559 (3.07 per match)
- Best player: (Colombia) José Angulo Pittsburgh Riverhounds
- Top goalscorer: (United States) Dom Dwyer Orlando City SC (Colombia) José Angulo Pittsburgh Riverhounds (15 Goals Each)
- Best goalkeeper: (United States) Andrew Dykstra Richmond Kickers
- Biggest home win: TAM 8, ANT 0 (June 7)
- Biggest away win: HAR 4, CHE 0 (June 1)
- Highest scoring: ORL 7, CHE 4 (September 7) (Championship)
- Longest winning run: 5 CHB & WIL
- Longest unbeaten run: 22 RIC (April 6 – August 2)
- Longest losing run: 26 ANT (Entire Season)
- Highest attendance: 20,886 Orlando City S.C. vs. Charlotte Eagles (September 7) (Championship)
- Lowest attendance: 100; CHB @ HOU (MLS Reserve) (May 19)
- Total attendance: 464,723
- Average attendance: 2,611

The 2013 USL Pro season was the 27th season of third-division soccer in the United States and is the third season of the United Soccer Leagues' (USL) PRO professional competition. The number of teams increased from eleven to thirteen with Phoenix FC and VSI Tampa Bay FC joining the league as expansion franchises.

== Teams ==
=== Stadiums and Locations ===
Locations of USL Pro clubs

Team	Location	Stadium	Capacity
Antigua Barracuda	St. John's, Antigua and Barbuda	Traveling Team	N/A
Charleston Battery	Charleston, South Carolina	Blackbaud Stadium	5,100
Charlotte Eagles	Charlotte, North Carolina	Dickson Field	2,500
Dayton Dutch Lions	Dayton, Ohio	Beavercreek Stadium	5,000
Harrisburg City Islanders	Harrisburg, Pennsylvania	Skyline Sports Complex	5,000
Los Angeles Blues	Fullerton, California	Titan Stadium	10,000
Orlando City	Orlando, Florida	Fifth Third Bank Field at the Citrus Bowl	65,000
Pittsburgh Riverhounds	Pittsburgh, Pennsylvania	Highmark Stadium	3,500
Phoenix FC	Phoenix, Arizona	Sun Devil Soccer Stadium	3,400
Richmond Kickers	Richmond, Virginia	City Stadium	22,000
Rochester Rhinos	Rochester, New York	Sahlen's Stadium	13,768
VSI Tampa Bay	Tampa Bay, Florida	Plant City Stadium	6,700
Wilmington Hammerheads	Wilmington, North Carolina	Legion Stadium	6,000

=== Personnel and kits ===
Note: Flags indicate national team as has been defined under FIFA eligibility rules. Players may hold more than one non-FIFA nationality.

Team	Manager	Captain	Kit supplier	Shirt sponsor
Antigua Barracuda	(England) Adrian Whitbread	(Antigua and Barbuda) George Dublin	Nike	Antigua and Barbuda Tourism
Charleston Battery	(United States) Michael Anhaeuser	(Republic of Ireland) Colin Falvey	Nike	Sparcet
Charlotte Eagles	(United States) Mark Steffens	(United States) Eric Reed	Nike	Powerade
Dayton Dutch Lions	(Netherlands) Patrick Bal	(United States) Joel DeLass	LAOne	Dayton Outpatient Center
Harrisburg City Islanders	(United States) Bill Becher	(United States) Jason Pelletier	Adidas	Capital Blue Cross
Los Angeles Blues	(Spain) Jesus Rico-Sanz	(Scotland) Allan Russell	Nike	Hilton Anaheim
Orlando City	(England) Adrian Heath	(Mexico) Miguel Gallardo	Lotto	Orlando Health
Pittsburgh Riverhounds	(United States) Justin Evans	(United States) Rich Costanzo	Nike	#1 Cochran
Phoenix FC	(Scotland) David Robertson	(United States) Andrew Weber	Nike	None
Richmond Kickers	(England) Leigh Cowlishaw	(United States) Michael Callahan	Adidas	Health Diagnostic Laboratory
Rochester Rhinos	(Canada) Pat Ercoli	(United States) Troy Roberts	Admiral	Bimbo Bakeries USA
VSI Tampa Bay	(United States) Joel Harrison	(United States) Kyle Hoffer	Admiral	None
Wilmington Hammerheads	(England) David Irving	(Scotland) Tom Parratt	Nike	New Hanover Regional Medical Center

=== MLS–USL Pro Alliance ===
On January 23, 2013, USL Pro announced an alliance with Major League Soccer. For the 2013 season, four MLS teams will affiliate with USL Pro teams in lieu of participating in the MLS Reserve League system. These MLS clubs will loan at least four of their reserve players to their USL Pro affiliate club for development purposes.

All USL Pro teams played two matches each with the remaining MLS Reserve League teams. Those matches counted toward the USL Pro standings, giving each team a total of 26 games.

The following teams affiliated:

- Sporting Kansas City — Orlando City
- New England Revolution — Rochester Rhinos
- D.C. United — Richmond Kickers
- Philadelphia Union — Harrisburg City Islanders

USL Pro teams played MLS Reserve teams as listed below. Except for Antiqua Barracuda (who played two MLS reserve teams on the road), each set was a home-and-away arrangement.

- Antiqua Barracuda — FC Dallas and San Jose Earthquakes
- Charleston Battery — Houston Dynamo
- Charlotte Eagles — Chicago Fire
- Dayton Dutch Lions — Columbus Crew
- Harrisburg City Islanders — Colorado Rapids
- Los Angeles Blues — Los Angeles Galaxy
- Orlando City SC — Seattle Sounders FC
- Pittsburgh Riverhounds — Toronto FC
- Phoenix FC — Real Salt Lake
- Richmond Kickers — Vancouver Whitecaps FC
- Rochester Rhinos — Montreal Impact
- VSI Tampa Bay — Portland Timbers
- Wilmington Hammerheads — New York Red Bulls

USL Pro teams compiled an 11 Win, 9 Tie and 6 Loss record against MLS Reserve Teams in 2013.

=== Player transfers ===
For full article, see List of USL Pro transfers 2013.

=== Managerial changes ===
Team	Outgoing manager	Position in table	Incoming manager	Date of appointment
Phoenix FC	Expansion team		(Scotland) David Robertson	15 July 2012
VSI Tampa Bay	Expansion team		(England) Matt Weston	22 November 2012
Los Angeles Blues	(United States) Charlie Naimo	Pre-Season	(Spain) Jesus Rico-Sanz	12 December 2012
Antigua Barracuda	(England) Tom Curtis	Pre-Season	(Antigua and Barbuda) Fernando Abraham	2013
VSI Tampa Bay	(England) Matt Weston	5th Place	(United States) Joel Harrison (Interim)	8 May 2013
Rochester Rhinos	(United States) Jesse Myers	12th Place	(Canada) Pat Ercoli	19 May 2013
Antigua Barracuda	(Antigua and Barbuda) Fernando Abraham	13th Place	(England) Adrian Whitbread	12 June 2013

== League table ==
Pos	Team	Pld	W	T	L	GF	GA	GD	Pts	Qualification
1	Richmond Kickers (C)	26	15	10	1	51	24	+27	55	Commissioner's Cup, Playoffs
2	Orlando City (A)	26	16	6	4	54	26	+28	54	Playoffs
3	Charleston Battery (A)	26	13	6	7	48	29	+19	45	Playoffs
4	Harrisburg City Islanders (A)	26	14	2	10	55	39	+16	44	Playoffs
5	Charlotte Eagles (A)	26	10	11	5	44	39	+5	41	Playoffs
6	Los Angeles Blues (A)	26	11	7	8	52	37	+15	40	Playoffs
7	Pittsburgh Riverhounds (A)	26	10	8	8	36	33	+3	38	Playoffs
8	Dayton Dutch Lions (A)	26	10	7	9	43	46	−3	37	Playoffs
9	Wilmington Hammerheads	26	11	4	11	35	39	−4	36 (Note: Wilmington were deducted one point for fielding an ineligible player on July 21 against Pittsburgh.)	
10	VSI Tampa Bay	26	9	5	12	41	39	+2	32	
11	Rochester Rhinos	26	6	10	10	25	39	−14	28	
12	Phoenix FC	26	5	7	14	28	41	−13	22	
13	Antigua Barracuda	26	0	0	26	11	91	−80	0	

Source: USL Pro official standings
Rules for classification: 1) points; 2) goal difference; 3) number of goals scored.
(A) Advances to USL Pro Playoffs; (C) Commissioner's Cup (best regular season record)

== Results table ==
Color Key: Home • Away • Win • Loss • Draw
Club	Match																									
Club	1	2	3	4	5	6	7	8	9	10	11	12	13	14	15	16	17	18	19	20	21	22	23	24	25	26
Antigua Barracuda FC (ANT)	CHE	WIL	CHB	TAM	ORL	HAR	RIC	PIT	DDL	TAM	ORL	RIC	HAR	ROC	PIT	LAB	PHX	PHX	LAB	SJE	DAL	DDL	ROC	CHE	CHB	WIL
Antigua Barracuda FC (ANT)	0–2	0–2	0–4	1–3	2–7	0–4	1–4	0–2	1–3	0–8	0–2	0–4	1–3	1–2	1–4	0–6	0–1	0–1	0–4	0–6	1–3	1–3	0–1	0–5	0–3	1–4
Charleston Battery (CHB)	RIC	ANT	PIT	HAR	DDL	WIL	CHE	HOU	ROC	HAR	CHE	HOU	PIT	ROC	TAM	ORL	ORL	TAM	DDL	PHX	LAB	WIL	RIC	LAB	PHX	ANT
Charleston Battery (CHB)	1–4	4–0	2–0	2–1	1–0	4–2	0–1	1–0	0–0	1–2	2–2	4–1	1–1	1–1	0–0	1–1	1–2	2–4	1–0	5–1	3–0	1–2	5–2	1–2	1–0	3–0
Charlotte Eagles (CHE)	ANT	ROC	ORL	PIT	RIC	CHB	PHX	LAB	HAR	CHB	CHI	TAM	WIL	DDL	CHI	PIT	ROC	WIL	DDL	LAB	PHX	RIC	HAR	ANT	TAM	ORL
Charlotte Eagles (CHE)	2–0	0–0	1–1	2–0	3–3	1–0	2–2	3–4	0–4	2–2	2–1	1–0	0–0	2–2	2–1	3–2	2–2	3–2	0–0	3–3	0–4	0–1	2–1	5–0	3–3	0–1
Dayton Dutch Lions (DDL)	PIT	TAM	ORL	CHB	PHX	PIT	ANT	LAB	COC	TAM	PHX	LAB	CHE	ROC	RIC	COC	ORL	CHB	CHE	HAR	ANT	ROC	WIL	WIL	RIC	HAR
Dayton Dutch Lions (DDL)	2–1	1–0	0–4	0–1	4–3	2–2	3–1	0–0	4–4	2–1	0–0	1–0	2–2	3–1	2–3	1–3	3–3	0–1	0–0	1–5	3–1	3–1	0–1	1–2	2–5	3–1
Harrisburg City Islanders (HAR)	PIT	COR	ROC	CHB	ROC	ANT	ORL	RIC	CHB	CHE	WIL	COR	ANT	PIT	PHX	WIL	LAB	RIC	TAM	ORL	DDL	PHX	LAB	CHE	TAM	DDL
Harrisburg City Islanders (HAR)	2–1	2–1	5–1	1–2	1–0	4–0	2–2	0–2	2–1	4–0	2–0	1–3	3–1	3–4	2–1	1–2	2–4	0–1	2–0	1–3	5–1	3–1	2–2	1–2	3–1	1–3
Los Angeles Blues (LAB)	PHX	TAM	ORL	PHX	ORL	TAM	WIL	PIT	LAG	RIC	WIL	CHE	ROC	DDL	LAG	DDL	ANT	PIT	HAR	ANT	RIC	CHE	CHB	HAR	CHB	ROC
Los Angeles Blues (LAB)	2–0	0–1	1–0	3–1	2–3	2–3	4–0	0–0	3–4	1–1	1–2	4–3	2–2	0–0	1–1	0–1	6–0	2–1	4–2	4–0	1–2	3–3	0–3	2–2	2–1	2–1
Orlando City S.C. (ORL)	PHX	LAB	ROC	LAB	CHE	DDL	ANT	SEA	HAR	ROC	WIL	PHX	ANT	RIC	WIL	CHB	CHB	DDL	PIT	HAR	PIT	TAM	TAM	SEA	RIC	CHE
Orlando City S.C. (ORL)	3–1	0–1	3–1	3–2	1–1	4–0	7–2	2–0	2–2	1–0	4–1	2–0	2–0	0–2	2–2	1–1	2–1	3–3	0–0	3–1	0–1	3–0	3–2	2–0	0–2	1–0
Phoenix FC (PHX)	LAB	TAM	ORL	LAB	RSL	WIL	PIT	PIT	DDL	CHE	RIC	WIL	ORL	TAM	RSL	DDL	HAR	ROC	ANT	ANT	RIC	CHB	CHE	HAR	CHB	ROC
Phoenix FC (PHX)	0–2	1–0	1–3	1–3	0–0	3–1	1–1	1–2	3–4	2–2	0–1	1–2	0–2	0–1	0–0	0–0	1–2	0–0	1–0	1–0	2–2	1–5	4–0	1–3	0–1	3–4
Pittsburgh Riverhounds (PIT)	RIC	HAR	DDL	CHE	CHB	PHX	LAB	PHX	DDL	ANT	ROC	TOR	CHB	HAR	ANT	CHE	LAB	ORL	WIL	TOR	TAM	ORL	ROC	TAM	WIL	RIC
Pittsburgh Riverhounds (PIT)	0–0	1–2	1–2	0–2	0–2	1–1	0–0	2–1	2–2	2–0	3–0	1–1	1–1	4–3	4–1	2–3	1–2	0–0	2–1	1–0	2–1	1–0	0–1	3–2	1–4	1–1
Richmond Kickers (RIC)	PIT	CHB	ROC	WIL	CHE	ANT	LAB	HAR	PHX	WIL	ANT	VAN	ORL	TAM	DDL	ROC	HAR	PHX	LAB	VAN	TAM	CHE	CHB	DDL	ORL	PIT
Richmond Kickers (RIC)	0–0	4–1	4–1	2–0	3–3	4–1	1–1	2–0	1–0	1–1	4–0	1–1	2–0	0–0	3–2	1–1	1–0	2–2	2–1	2–1	0–0	1–0	2–5	5–2	2–0	1–1
Rochester Rhinos (ROC)	TAM	ORL	CHE	RIC	HAR	HAR	WIL	ORL	CHB	LAB	PIT	MTL	TAM	CHB	ANT	PHX	DDL	CHE	RIC	WIL	MTL	ANT	DDL	PIT	PHX	LAB
Rochester Rhinos (ROC)	0–3	1–3	0–0	1–4	1–5	0–1	1–0	0–1	0–0	2–2	0–3	1–1	3–0	1–1	2–1	0–0	1–3	2–2	1–1	0–0	0–0	1–0	1–3	1–0	4–3	1–2
VSI Tampa Bay FC (TAM)	PHX	LAB	POR	ROC	LAB	DDL	ANT	WIL	POR	ANT	PHX	ROC	DDL	CHE	CHB	RIC	CHB	HAR	WIL	RIC	PIT	ORL	ORL	HAR	PIT	CHE
VSI Tampa Bay FC (TAM)	0–1	1–0	1–2	3–0	3–2	0–1	3–1	1–0	4–4	8–0	1–0	0–3	1–2	0–1	0–0	0–0	4–2	0–2	2–1	0–0	1–2	0–3	2–3	1–3	2–3	3–3
Wilmington Hammerheads (WIL)	ANT	LAB	PHX	RIC	ROC	CHB	LAB	ORL	TAM	PHX	HAR	RIC	NYR	CHE	NYR	ORL	HAR	CHE	ROC	PIT	TAM	CHB	DDL	DDL	PIT	ANT
Wilmington Hammerheads (WIL)	2–0	0–4	1–3	0–2	0–1	2–4	2–1	1–4	0–1	2–1	0–2	1–1	1–0	0–0	2–1	2–2	2–1	2–3	0–0	1–2	1–2	2–1	1–0	2–1	4–1	4–1
MLS Reserve Teams: Chicago Fire – CHI • Columbus Crew – COC • Colorado Rapids – COR • FC Dallas – DAL • Houston Dynamo – HOU • Los Angeles Galaxy – LAG • Montreal Impact – MTL New York Red Bulls – NYR • Portland Timbers – POR • Real Salt Lake – RSL • Seattle Sounders FC – SEA • San Jose Earthquakes – SJE • Toronto FC – TOR • Vancouver Whitecaps FC – VAN

USL Pro published schedule and results.

== Playoffs ==
The 2013 USL PRO Playoffs will include the top eight finishers in the table, with the quarterfinals (No. 1 vs. No. 8, No. 2 vs. No. 7, etc.) set for the weekend of August 23–25. The semifinals featuring the four remaining teams will be played the following weekend, with the 2013 USL PRO Championship set for the weekend of September 6–8. All playoff rounds feature a single-game knockout format and teams will not be re-seeded following each round.

Quarter-Finals
1	Richmond Kickers	1
8	Dayton Dutch Lions	0
4	Harrisburg City Islanders	1
5	Charlotte Eagles	3
2	Orlando City	5
7	Pittsburgh Riverhounds	0
3	Charleston Battery	2
6	Los Angeles Blues	1

Semi-Finals
1	Richmond Kickers	1
5	Charlotte Eagles	2
2	Orlando City	3
3	Charleston Battery	2

USL PRO Championship
5	Charlotte Eagles	4
2	Orlando City	7

August 24, 2013 QF	Harrisburg City Islanders	1–3	Charlotte Eagles	Harrisburg, Pennsylvania
2:00 pm EDT	Pelletier (yellow card) 46'; Touray (yellow card) 52'; Basso (yellow card) 56' (yellow-red card) 81'; Mkosana 85'	Report; Report	Ramirez 52'; Yates (yellow card) 54'; Herrera 82'; Asante 90+'	Stadium: Skyline Sports Complex; Attendance: 1,124; Referee: Eric Weisbrod

August 24, 2013 QF	Richmond Kickers	1–0	Dayton Dutch Lions	Richmond, Virginia
7:00 pm EDT	Ownby (yellow card) 34'; Ngwenya 65'	Report; Report		Stadium: City Stadium; Attendance: 4,265; Referee: Charles Carson

August 24, 2013 QF	Charleston Battery	2–1	Los Angeles Blues	Charleston, South Carolina
7:30 pm EDT	Kelly 24' (yellow card) 75'; Azira 71' (yellow card) 89'	Report; Report	Davis (yellow card) 30'; Miller (yellow card) 43'; O'Leary (yellow card) 58'; Roknipour 84'	Stadium: Blackbaud Stadium; Attendance: 2,708; Referee: Howard Ash

August 24, 2013 QF	Orlando City	5–0	Pittsburgh Riverhounds	Orlando, Florida
7:30 pm EDT	Tan 3', 48'; Boufleur 5'; Boden (yellow card) 54'; Chin 68'; Pulis 80' (pen.)	Report; Report	Marshall (yellow card) 4'	Stadium: Citrus Bowl; Attendance: 8,486; Referee: Caleb Mendez

August 30, 2013 SF	Orlando City	3–2	Charleston Battery	Orlando, Florida
7:30 pm EDT	Tan 5' (yellow card) 72' (yellow-red card) 74'; Mbengue 6' (yellow card) 67'; Chin 18'	Report; Report	Ellison (yellow card) 9'; Azira 33'; Sanyang (yellow card) 47' (goal) 60'; Falvey (red card) 74'	Stadium: Citrus Bowl; Attendance: 8,912; Referee: Jose Carlos Rivera

August 31, 2013 SF	Richmond Kickers	1–2	Charlotte Eagles	Richmond, Virginia
7:00 pm EDT	Callahan 11'	Report; Report	Ramirez 31'; Herrera 38'	Stadium: City Stadium; Attendance: 2,539; Referee: Jorge Gonzalez

September 7, 2013 F	Orlando City	7–4	Charlotte Eagles	Orlando, Florida
7:30 pm EDT	Dwyer 33', 42', 61' (pen.), 69'; Chin 70', 90'; Boden (yellow card) 71'; Mbengue 85'	Report; Report; Report; Report	Okiomah 20'; Ramirez 43', 58'; Asante (yellow card) 86'; Meza 88'	Stadium: Citrus Bowl; Attendance: 20,886; Referee: Ismail Elfath

Championship Game MVP: (United States) Dom Dwyer (ORL)

=== Average home attendances ===
Ranked from highest to lowest average attendance.

Team	GP	Total	High	Low	Average
Orlando City SC	14	112,784	10,697	5,985	8,056
Rochester Rhinos	14	82,576	7,334	4,361	5,898
Charleston Battery	14	49,760	5,111	2,057	3,554
Pittsburgh Riverhounds SC	14	45,816	4,000	1,664	3,273
Wilmington Hammerheads	14	44,269	5,017	1,769	3,162
Richmond Kickers	14	35,381	4,921	1,694	2,527
Phoenix FC	14	21,454	4,198	327	1,532
MLS Reserves	10	8,263	8,263	100	1,512
Harrisburg City Islanders	14	20,386	2,170	730	1,456
Charlotte Eagles	14	11,297	1,336	332	807
Dayton Dutch Lions	14	10,540	1,621	250	753
Los Angeles Blues	14	10,049	3,000	176	718
VSI Tampa Bay	14	5,295	1,032	139	378
Total	100	464,723	10,697	100	2,611

== Statistical leaders ==
=== Top scorers ===
Rank	Player	Nation	Club	Goals
1	Dom Dwyer	USA	Orlando City	15
1	José Angulo	COL	Pittsburgh Riverhounds	15
3	Lucky Mkosana	ZIM	Harrisburg City Islanders	13
4	Dane Kelly	JAM	Charleston Battery	11
4	Sainey Touray	GAM	Harrisburg City Islanders	11
6	Jorge Herrera	COL	Charlotte Eagles	10
6	Mauricio Salles	BRA	VSI Tampa Bay FC	10
6	Jamie Watson	USA	Orlando City	10
6	Matthew Fondy	USA	Los Angeles Blues	10
10	Gibson Bardsley	USA	Dayton Dutch Lions	9
10	Chris Cortez	USA	Los Angeles Blues	9
10	Joseph Ngwenya	ZIM	Richmond Kickers	9

=== Top assists ===
Rank	Player	Nation	Club	Assists
1	Matthew Dallman	USA	Pittsburgh Riverhounds	12
2	Rodrigo López	MEX	Los Angeles Blues	11
3	Nate Robinson	USA	Richmond Kickers	9
4	Gibson Bardsley	USA	Dayton Dutch Lions	7
4	Jamie Watson	USA	Orlando City	7
6	Brian Ownby	USA	Richmond Kickers	6
6	Tom Parratt	SCO	Wilmington Hammerheads	6
6	Sainey Touray	GAM	Harrisburg City Islanders	6
6	Drew Yates	USA	Charlotte Eagles	6
10	Luke Boden	ENG	Orlando City	5
10	Chad Burt	USA	VSI Tampa Bay FC	5
10	Sascha Görres	GER	Richmond Kickers	5
10	Christian Ramirez	USA	Charlotte Eagles	5
10	Joseph Ngwenya	ZIM	Richmond Kickers	5

=== Top Goalkeepers ===
(Minimum of 1080 Minutes Played)

Rank	Goalkeeper	Club	GP	MINS	SVS	GA	GAA	W-L-T	SHO
1	(United States) Andrew Dykstra	Richmond Kickers	22	1980	75	19	0.863	13–1–8	10
2	(Mexico) Miguel Gallardo	Orlando City	15	1221	44	13	0.958	8–3–3	5
3	(Cuba) Odisnel Cooper	Charleston Battery	22	1980	50	24	1.090	11–6–5	7
4	(United States) Carl Woszczynski	Los Angeles Blues	13	1170	50	15	1.153	8–4–1	6
5	(United States) Hunter Gilstrap	Pittsburgh Riverhounds	21	1890	67	25	1.190	8–5–8	5
6	(United States) Alex Horwath	VSI Tampa Bay FC	23	2044	67	33	1.453	8–11–4	6
7	(United States) Andrew Weber	Phoenix FC	14	1215	41	20	1.481	1–8–5	3
8	(United States) Nick Noble	Harrisburg City Islanders	26	2340	105	39	1.500	14–10–2	5
9	(United States) Eric Reed	Charlotte Eagles	25	2238	101	38	1.528	10–4–11	8
10	(Germany) Kristian Nicht	Rochester Rhinos	24	2074	88	36	1.562	4–10–10	8

== League awards ==
- Most Valuable Player: (Colombia) José Angulo (PIT)
- Rookie of the Year: (United States) Nate Robinson (RIC)
- Defender of the Year: (Republic of Ireland) Colin Falvey (CHB)
- Goalkeeper of the Year: (United States) Andrew Dykstra (RIC)
- Coach of the Year: (England) Leigh Cowlishaw (RIC)

== All-League Teams ==
=== First Team ===
F: (Colombia) José Angulo (PIT), (United States) Dom Dwyer (ORL), (The Gambia) Sainey Touray (HAR)
M: (United States) Matt Dallman (PIT), (Zimbabwe) Joseph Ngwenya (RIC), (United States) Jamie Watson (ORL)
D: (Republic of Ireland) Colin Falvey (CHB), (Uganda) Henry Kalungi (RIC), (United States) Rob Valentino (ORL), (Cameroon) William Yomby (RIC)
G: (United States) Andrew Dykstra (RIC)

=== Second Team ===
F: (United States) Gibson Bardsley (DAY), (United States) Matt Fondy (LAB), (Zimbabwe) Lucky Mkosana (HAR)
M: (Uganda) Michael Azira (CHB), (United States) George Davis IV (LAB), (Colombia) Jorge Herrera (CHE)
D: (Republic of Ireland) Danny Earls (ROC), (United States) Josh Rife (TAM), (United States) Andrew Marshall (PIT), (United States) Daniel Steres (WIL)
G: (United States) Nick Noble (HAR)
