= 2012 Orlando City SC season =

Orlando City
2012 season
- Owners: (England) John Bonner (England) Phil Rawlins
- Manager: (England) Adrian Heath
- Stadium: Citrus Bowl
- USL Pro: 1st
- USL Pro Playoffs: Semi-final
- U.S. Open Cup: Third round
- WDW Pro Soccer Classic: Group Stage
- Top goalscorer: League: Chin (11); All: Chin (12)
- Highest home attendance: 8,932 vs Dayton (August 17)
- Lowest home attendance: 3,506 vs Harrisburg (June 22)
- Average home league attendance: 6,606 (league); 6,904 (all CB matches)
Home colors	Away colors

The 2012 Orlando City SC season was the club's second season of existence. It is City's second consecutive year in the third tier of American soccer, playing in the USL Professional Division for their second season. In the 2011 season, Orlando City won the regular season and the playoffs. As of the 1 March 2012, there are approximately 3,500 season ticket holders for the 2012 season. They ended the season with winning the league title for the second consecutive year, but they lost in the Playoffs to the Wilmington Hammerheads in the Semi-final 3–4.

== Background ==
In October 2010, the Orlando Pro Soccer USL rights were purchased by Phil Rawlins, who moved the Austin Aztex organization to Orlando, and the team was announced on October 25, 2010. Rawlins has stated that he intends to bring a Major League Soccer franchise to Orlando "within 3–5 years". Rawlins was able to bring international matches to the city in 2011 when Orlando played English Premier League sides Bolton Wanderers and Newcastle United. Rawlins is President and majority owner and Adrian Heath is the manager.

== Competitions ==
=== Friendlies ===
February 13, 2012 Preseason 1	Orlando City	1–1	Seattle Sounders FC	Bradenton, Florida
4:00pm EST UTC-5	Chin 27'		Ochoa 53'	Stadium: IMG Soccer Academy

February 18, 2012 Preseason 2	Orlando City	1–1	Philadelphia Union	Orlando, Florida
6:00pm EST UTC-5	Griffin 90+3'		Califf 27'	Stadium: Citrus Bowl; Attendance: 5,963

March 5, 2012 Preseason 3	Orlando City	3–1	Old Dominion Monarchs	Lake Buena Vista, Florida
5:00pm EST UTC-5	Rooney 19'; Chin 59'; Fuller 75'	Report	Smith 36'	Stadium: ESPN Wide World of Sports Complex

March 14, 2012 Preseason 4	Rollins Tars	0–1	Orlando City	Winter Park, Florida
7:00pm EST UTC-5			Clark 16'	Stadium: Cahall Sandspur Field and Barker Family Stadium

March 17, 2012 Preseason 5	Orlando City	3–0	Stetson Hatters	Sanford, Florida
4:00pm EDT UTC-4	Watson 20', 34'; Sowers 24'			Stadium: Seminole Soccer Complex

March 21, 2012 Preseason 6	Orlando City	1–0	Tampa Spartans	Sanford, Florida
7:00pm EDT UTC-4	Chin 61'			Stadium: Seminole Soccer Complex

March 25, 2012 Preseason 7	Orlando City	3–0	UCF Knights	Orlando, Florida
1:00pm EDT UTC-4	Jérôme 45'; Griffin 47'; Mbengue 74'			Stadium: UCF Soccer and Track Stadium

March 31, 2012 Preseason 8	South Florida Bulls	0–5	Orlando City	Tampa, Florida
7:00pm EDT UTC-4			Mbengue 32'; Valentino 37'; Molino 45'; Boden 46'; Chin 53'	Stadium: Corbett Stadium

July 28, 2012 Summer 1	Orlando City	0–1	Stoke City	Orlando, Florida
7:30pm EDT UTC-4			Walters 45+1'	Stadium: Citrus Bowl; Attendance: 10,441; Referee: Marcos Deoliveira

Orlando City originally agreed to play Nottingham Forest F.C. on July 21, 2012. However, this match was canceled when Forest sacked their manager, Steve Cotterill. The team also canceled a friendly with Charleston Battery, forgoing their American tour altogether.

=== WDW Pro Soccer Classic ===
February 25, 2012 Group 1	Orlando City	2–2	Toronto	Lake Buena Vista, Florida
18:00 UTC-5	Rooney 17' (pen.); Molino 54'		Aceval 24'; Frings 65'	Stadium: ESPN Wide World of Sports Complex; Attendance: approx 2,000; Referee: Geoff Gamble

February 28, 2012 Group 2	Orlando City	0–4	Dallas	Lake Buena Vista, Florida
18:00 UTC-5			Ferreira 5' (pen.); Castillo 33'; Pérez 55'; Wiedeman 89'	Stadium: ESPN Wide World of Sports Complex

March 1, 2012 Group 3	Orlando City	0–2	Häcken	Lake Buena Vista, Florida
20:00 UTC-5			Anklev 61', 66'	Stadium: ESPN Wide World of Sports Complex

=== USL Pro ===
All times from this point on Eastern Daylight Time (UTC−04:00)

==== Results summary ====
Overall								Home						Away					
Pld	W	D	L	GF	GA	GD	Pts	W	D	L	GF	GA	GD	W	D	L	GF	GA	GD
24	17	6	1	50	18	+32	57	8	4	0	27	8	+19	9	2	1	23	10	+13

Last updated: July 27, 2012.
Source: Match reports

Round	1	2	3	4	5	6	7	8	9	10	11	12	13	14	15	16	17	18	19	20	21	22	23	24
Stadium	A	H	A	H	H	A	A	H	H	A	H	H	H	A	A	A	A	H	A	H	H	A	A	H
Result	W	W	W	D	W	W	W	D	W	L	W	W	W	D	D	W	W	W	W	D	W	W	W	D

Updated to match(es) played on July 14, 2012. Source: Match reports
A = Away; H = Home; W = Win; D = Draw; L = Loss

==== Results ====
April 7, 2012 1	Charlotte Eagles	0–2	Orlando City	Charlotte, North Carolina
7:00pm			Chin 3'; Molino 90+2'	Stadium: Restart Field, Charlotte Christian School; Attendance: 891; Referee: Danny Thornberry

April 15, 2012 2	Orlando City	4–1	Wilmington Hammerheads	Orlando, Florida
6:00pm	Rooney 9' (pen.), 41'; Valentino 54'; Chin 65'		Taylor 56'	Stadium: Citrus Bowl; Attendance: 8,421; Referee: Cedric Adams

April 21, 2012 3	Richmond Kickers	0–2	Orlando City	Richmond, Virginia
7:00pm			Fuller 61'; Pulis 90' (pen.)	Stadium: City Stadium; Attendance: 3,169; Referee: Mark Gorak

April 28, 2012 4	Orlando City	0–0	Richmond Kickers	Orlando, Florida
7:30pm				Stadium: Citrus Bowl; Attendance: 7,899; Referee: Marcos C. De Oliveira

May 5, 2012 5	Orlando City	3–2	Pittsburgh Riverhounds	Orlando, Florida
7:30pm	Chin 68'; Campbell 80'; Fuller 88'		Allen 79' (o.g.); Kassel 86'	Stadium: Citrus Bowl; Attendance: 6,722; Referee: Donald Dellavia

May 11, 2012 6	Antigua Barracuda	0–1	Orlando City	St. George, Antigua, Antigua and Barbuda
7:00pm			Dublin 89' (o.g.)	Stadium: Sir Vivian Richards Stadium; Attendance: 800; Referee: Audwin Walsh

May 13, 2012 7	Antigua Barracuda	1–2	Orlando City	St. George, Antigua, Antigua and Barbuda
4:30pm	Griffith 20' (pen.)		Griffin 26'; Allen 49'	Stadium: Sticky Wicket Stadium; Attendance: 1,000; Referee: Curtis Charles

May 24, 2012 8	Orlando City	1–1	Los Angeles Blues	Orlando, Florida
7:30pm	Allen 22'		Dike 25'	Stadium: Citrus Bowl; Attendance: 7,231; Referee: Jonathan Weiner

May 26, 2012 9	Orlando City	2–1	Charlotte Eagles	Orlando, Florida
7:30pm	Watson 14'; Luzunaris 53'		Meza 79'	Stadium: Citrus Bowl; Attendance: 6,821; Referee: Rob Mauws

June 2, 2012 10	Wilmington Hammerheads	3–1	Orlando City	Wilmington, North Carolina
7:30pm	Hertzog 25', 90+'; Briggs 56'		Chin 14'	Stadium: Legion Stadium; Attendance: 4,792; Referee: Brandon Marion

June 9, 2012 11	Orlando City	2–1	Charleston Battery	Orlando, Florida
7:30pm	Alexandre 7'; Watson 57'		Paterson 38'	Stadium: Citrus Bowl; Attendance: 5,602; Referee: Cedric Adams

June 17, 2012 12	Orlando City	2–0	Antigua Barracuda	Orlando, Florida
6:00pm	Bernard 14'; Luzunaris 90+3'			Stadium: Citrus Bowl; Attendance: 6,148; Referee: Donald Dellavida

June 22, 2012 13	Orlando City	3–0	Harrisburg City Islanders	Orlando, Florida
7:30pm	Luzunaris 45+2'; Chin 47', 70'			Stadium: Citrus Bowl; Attendance: 3,506; Referee: Marcos C. De Oliveira

June 29, 2012 14	Dayton Dutch Lions	2–2	Orlando City	Dayton, Ohio
8:00pm	DeLass 21'; Priestley 31'		Luzunaris 4'; Pulis 29' (pen.)	Stadium: Miami Valley South Stadium; Attendance: 512; Referee: Cory Richardson

June 30, 2012 15	Pittsburgh Riverhounds	1–1	Orlando City	Pittsburgh, Pennsylvania
7:00pm	Kassel 82'		Molino 90'	Stadium: Chartier Valley Stadium; Attendance: 1,215; Referee: Ryan Schwoeble

July 6, 2012 16	Los Angeles Blues	0–1	Orlando City	Fullerton, California
10:30pm			Bernard 2'	Stadium: Titan Stadium, CS-Fullerton; Attendance: 365; Referee: Daniel Radford

July 8, 2012 17	Los Angeles Blues	0–4	Orlando City	Fullerton, California
8:00pm			Chin 7', 17'; Alexandre 70'; Luzunaris 78'	Stadium: Titan Stadium, CS-Fullerton; Attendance: 673; Referee: Jesse Yzaguirre

July 14, 2012 18	Orlando City	4–0	Rochester Rhinos	Orlando, Florida
7:30pm	Luzunaris 10'; Jérôme 15'; Valentino 27'; López 73' (pen.)			Stadium: Citrus Bowl; Attendance: 7,260; Referee: Ted Unkel

July 19, 2012 19	Charleston Battery	1–2	Orlando City	Charleston, South Carolina
7:30pm	Cuevas 64'		Luzunaris 90'; Fuller 90+2'	Stadium: Blackbaud Stadium; Attendance: 2,983; Referee: Patrick Baker

July 25, 2012 20	Orlando City	1–1	Wilmington Hammerheads	Orlando, Florida
7:30pm	Luzunaris 84'		Taylor 68'	Stadium: Citrus Bowl; Attendance: 6,031; Referee: Kristen Schiereck

July 27, 2012 21	Orlando City	4–0	Charleston Battery	Orlando, Florida
7:30pm	Hoffer 16' (o.g.); Luzunaris 21'; Chin 77', 85'			Stadium: Citrus Bowl; Attendance: 4,703; Referee: Christina Ibañez

August 1, 2012 22	Harrisburg City Islanders	2–4	Orlando City	Harrisburg, Pennsylvania
7:00pm	Pettis 10'; Allen 82' (o.g.)		Watson 6', 31'; Ustruck 62'; Chin 75'	Stadium: Skyline Sports Complex; Referee: Darth Newman

August 3, 2012 23	Rochester Rhinos	0–1	Orlando City	Rochester, New York
7:35pm			Watson 65'	Stadium: Sahlen's Stadium

August 17, 2012 24	Orlando City	1–1	Dayton Dutch Lions	Orlando, Florida
7:30pm	Copier 85' (o.g.)		Holowaty 90+1'	Stadium: Citrus Bowl; Attendance: 8,932; Referee: Rob Mauws

==== Standings ====
Pos	Team	Pld	W	T	L	GF	GA	GD	Pts	Qualification
1	Orlando City SC (C)	24	17	6	1	50	18	+32	57	Commissioner's Cup, Playoffs 1st round bye
2	Rochester Rhinos (A)	24	12	5	7	27	23	+4	41	Playoffs 1st round bye
3	Charleston Battery (A)	24	12	2	10	36	26	+10	38	Playoffs
4	Richmond Kickers (A)	24	11	5	8	31	27	+4	38	Playoffs
5	Wilmington Hammerheads (A)	24	10	7	7	34	32	+2	37	Playoffs
6	Harrisburg City Islanders (A)	24	10	7	7	34	29	+5	37	Playoffs
7	Charlotte Eagles	24	11	3	10	34	26	+8	36	
8	Los Angeles Blues	24	9	3	12	26	29	−3	30	
9	Dayton Dutch Lions	24	4	10	10	20	29	−9	22	
10	Pittsburgh Riverhounds	24	4	5	15	20	39	−19	17	
11	Antigua Barracuda	24	5	1	18	16	50	−34	16	

Source: USL Pro official standings
Rules for classification: Points, then tiebreak: 1) Head-to-head record based on total points in League games, 2) Total wins in League games, 3) Goal difference in League games, 4) Goals scored in League games, etc.
(A) Advances to USL Pro Playoffs; (C) Commissioner's Cup (best regular season record)

=== USL Pro Playoffs ===
August 31, 2012 SF	Orlando City	3–4	Wilmington Hammerheads	Orlando, Florida
7:30pm	Luzunaris 44'; O'Connor (yellow card) 61'; Watson (yellow card) 81', (goal) 90' (pen.); Davis 90+'		Hertzog 4' (pen.), 59', (yellow card) 90+'; Holmes 9'; Chirishian (yellow card) 29', (goal) 30'; Cole (yellow card) 32'; Riley (red card) 64'; Guzman (yellow card) 71'; Hernandez (yellow card) 90+'	Stadium: Citrus Bowl; Attendance: 7,887; Referee: Marcos C. De Oliveira

=== U.S. Open Cup ===
As part of the new format for the U.S. Open Cup in 2012, Orlando City entered with the other U.S.-based teams from USL Pro and the NASL in the second round. The first two rounds were drawn on May 1, 2012, and the third round was drawn on May 16, 2012.

May 22, 2012 2nd Round	Orlando City (Florida)	7–0	(Missouri) KC Athletics	Sanford, Florida
7:30 PM EDT	Andrews 4' (o.g.); Griffin 26', 42'; Rooney 28', 71'; Watson 60'; Luzunaris 86'			Stadium: Seminole Soccer Complex; Attendance: 946; Referee: Ted Unkel

May 29, 2012 3rd Round	Sporting Kansas City	3–2	(Florida) Orlando City	Kansas City, Kansas
8:30 PM EDT	Collin (yellow card) 23'; Nagamura 45+2'; Saad 65', 69'; Peterson (yellow card) 78'		Valentino (yellow card) 51'; Molino 55'; Pulis (red card) 70'; Chin 84'	Stadium: Livestrong Sporting Park; Attendance: 12,217; Referee: Younes Marrakchi

== Club ==
=== Roster ===
No.	Position	Nation	Player
1	GK	MEX	Miguel Gallardo
2	DF	HAI	Mechack Jérôme
3	MF	SEN	Adama Mbengue
4	MF	USA	Ian Fuller (captain)
5	DF	JAM	Kieron Bernard
6	MF	WAL	Anthony Pulis
7	MF	USA	Nick Sowers
8	DF	USA	Erik Ustruck
9	MF	USA	Rodrigo López
10	MF	ENG	John Rooney
11	FW	USA	Maxwell Griffin
12	FW	USA	Matt Luzunaris
13	DF	USA	Justin Clark
14	MF	ENG	Luke Boden
15	FW	USA	Dennis Chin
16	DF	USA	Wes Allen
17	MF	IRL	James O'Connor
18	MF	TRI	Kevin Molino
20	DF	USA	Kyle Davies
21	GK	USA	Sean Kelley
22	DF	USA	Rob Valentino
23	MF	USA	Charlie Campbell
25	DF	USA	George Davis IV
77	FW	USA	Jamie Watson

=== Squad information ===
No.	Nat.	Player	Birthday	Previous club	2012 USL Pro appearances	2012 USL Pro goals
Goalkeepers
1	(Mexico)	Miguel Gallardo	October 24, 1984 (age 41)	(United States) Austin Lightning*	21	0
21	(United States)	Sean Kelley	April 18, 1988 (age 38)	(United States) Northern Virginia Royals*	4	0
Defenders
2	(Haiti)	Mechack Jérôme	April 21, 1990 (age 36)	(Portugal) S.C. Mirandela*	20	1
5	(Jamaica)	Kieron Bernard	August 2, 1985 (age 41)	(United States) Austin Aztex U23*	15	2
8	(United States)	Erik Ustruck	January 4, 1985 (age 41)	(United States) FC Tampa Bay	18	1
13	(United States)	Justin Clark	October 17, 1988 (age 37)	(United States) Rollins College	5	0
16	(United States)	Wes Allen	September 17, 1986 (age 39)	(United States) Austin Aztex U23*	8	2
20	(United States)	Kyle Davies	April 11, 1989 (age 37)	(Canada) Toronto FC	16	0
22	(United States)	Rob Valentino	December 21, 1985 (age 40)	(United States) FC Tampa Bay	15	2
Midfielders
3	(Senegal)	Adama Mbengue	December 1, 1993 (age 32)	(United States) Orlando City U-23	11	0
4	(United States)	Ian Fuller	August 31, 1979 (age 47)	(United States) Charleston Battery*	22	3
6	(Wales)	Anthony Pulis	July 21, 1984 (age 42)	(England) Aldershot Town F.C.	15	2
7	(United States)	Nick Sowers	January 12, 1989 (age 37)	(United States) Rollins College	0	0
9	(United States)	Rodrigo López	May 10, 1987 (age 39)	(United States) Ventura County Fusion	8	1
10	(England)	John Rooney	December 17, 1990 (age 35)	(United States) New York Red Bulls	9	2
14	(England)	Luke Boden	November 26, 1988 (age 37)	(England) Sheffield Wednesday F.C.	21	0
17	(Republic of Ireland)	James O'Connor	September 1, 1979 (age 47)	(England) Sheffield Wednesday F.C.	21	0
18	(Trinidad and Tobago)	Kevin Molino	June 17, 1990 (age 36)	(Trinidad and Tobago) Ma Pau SC	23	2
23	(United States)	Charlie Campbell	January 5, 1988 (age 38)	(United States) Louisville Cardinals	19	1
Strikers
11	(United States)	Maxwell Griffin	September 17, 1987 (age 38)	(United States) Los Angeles Legends*	8	1
12	(United States)	Matt Luzunaris	March 6, 1989 (age 37)	(United States) San Jose Earthquakes	18	9
15	(United States)	Dennis Chin	June 4, 1987 (age 39)	(United States) Central Florida Kraze	24	11
77	(United States)	Jamie Watson	April 10, 1986 (age 40)	(United States) Wilmington Hammerheads*	23	5

* = Denotes players who were retained after the move of the Austin Aztex FC organization to form Orlando City S.C.

== Transfers ==
=== In ===
- (United States) Matt Luzunaris was signed on free transfer on December 4, 2011. The forward was originally loaned to the Lions by San Jose Earthquakes of Major League Soccer for a few games during the 2011 season and scored two goals, including one in their friendly against Bolton Wanderers F.C. The 22-year-old native of Margate, Florida (near Fort Lauderdale), spent a year with UCF in 2007 before being signed to teams in Austria and spending three years there.
- (Republic of Ireland) James O'Connor was signed on free transfer on January 10, 2012. The Irish midfielder spent 15 years playing in England, and most recently played for Sheffield Wednesday F.C. of Football League One.
- (Wales) Anthony Pulis was transferred from Aldershot Town F.C. on January 17, 2012. The Welsh midfielder has been loaned to various clubs throughout England.
- (England) John Rooney was signed to the team on January 26, 2012. The younger brother of Manchester United's Wayne Rooney, he is a Liverpool native and has played most recently with the New York Red Bulls of the MLS.
- (United States) Justin Clark was signed by Orlando City on April 4, 2012. The defender played for local Rollins College where he was named the 2011 Defender of the Year for the Sunshine State Conference.
- (United States) Kyle Davies was signed by Orlando City on April 5, 2012 after having been waived by Toronto FC in November 2011.
- (United States) Jhohan Obando was signed to a short-term contract in early April to serve as Kelley’s back-up during Gallardo's suspension from the red card he received in the championship game.
- (United States) Nick Sowers was signed by Orlando City on April 20, 2012. The midfielder joins fellow Rollins alumni Justin Clark and Dennis Chin. Sowers if from Longwood, Florida and played at Lake Mary High School. Nick is currently on loan to Orlando City U-23.
- (Senegal) Adama Mbengue was signed by Orlando City on June 21, 2012. The midfielder was promoted from Orlando City U-23 to Orlando City, becoming the first player from U-23 to be promoted to the pro squad.
- (United States) Rodrigo López was signed by Orlando City on July 5, 2012. The midfielder has played most recently with the Ventura County Fusion of the PDL.

=== Out ===
- (Kenya) Lawrence Olum was signed as a free agent in September 2011 by Sporting Kansas City. The midfielder had 21 appearances with Orlando City in 2011 scoring 1 goal.
- (United States) Jack Traynor signed with the Rochester Rhinos on November 28, 2011. Traynor logged 1,298 minutes in 17 appearances for Orlando City in 2011.
- (Cuba) Yordany Álvarez was signed on a transfer from Orlando City in January 2012. At the end of the 2011 season, Álvarez joined Real Salt Lake on a loan agreement which included an option for Salt Lake to purchase Álvarez.
- (Trinidad and Tobago) Devorn Jorsling returned to Trinidad where he played for the national team and Caledonia AIA.
- (England) Lewis Neal was signed by D.C. United on March 13, 2012 after having been on loan from Orlando City.
- (Trinidad and Tobago) Justin Fojo is no longer listed on the Orlando City Roster, after a move in 2012 to the Puerto Rico Islanders.
- (Jamaica) Demar Stewart is no longer listed on the Orlando City Roster

=== Loan in ===
- (Haiti) Jean Alexandre was loaned from the San Jose Earthquakes on 7 June 2012, for a short-term loan for the next two games. on 6 July 2012, Alexandre re-joined Orlando City again for a short-term loan for the next two games which the two games will be against the Los Angeles Blues. On 23 July 2012, he returned again for the remainder of the 2012 USL Pro season.
- (United States) George Davis IV was loaned from the Los Angeles Blues in exchange for Maxwell Griffin, the loan will be through the end of the 2012 USL Pro season.

=== Loan out ===
- (England) Lewis Neal was on trial with Real Salt Lake and released on 16 February 2012.
- (England) Lewis Neal was on trial with D.C. United. until D.C. United signed him on March 13, 2012
- (United States) Maxwell Griffin was on loan to Los Angeles Blues in exchange for George Davis IV, the loan will be through the end of the 2012 USL Pro season.
- (United States) Jamie Watson is on loan to Minnesota Stars FC for the remainder of the 2012 NASL season.

== See also ==
- 2012 in American soccer
- 2012 USL Pro season
- Orlando City
