= Luke Boden =

English footballer

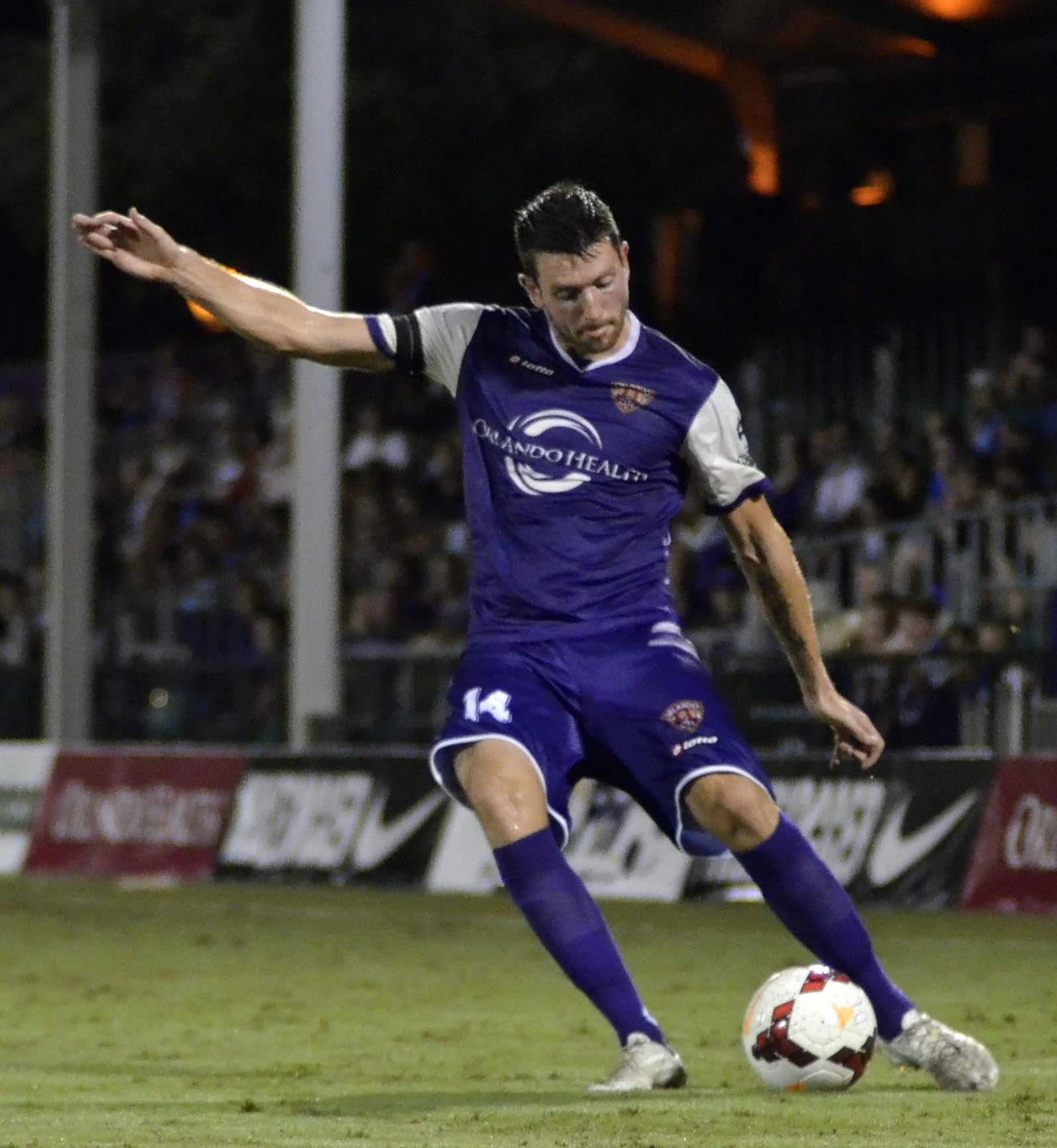

Personal information
- Full name: Luke Boden
- Date of birth: 26 November 1988 (age 37)
- Place of birth: Sheffield, England
- Positions: Left back; midfielder

Youth career
- 2000–2007: Sheffield Wednesday

Senior career*
Years	Team	Apps	(Gls)
2006–2011	Sheffield Wednesday	15	(0)
2008	→ Chesterfield (loan)	4	(0)
2008	→ Rushden & Diamonds (loan)	4	(0)
2009	→ Northampton Town (loan)	4	(0)
2011–2014	Orlando City	87	(4)
2015–2016	Orlando City	45	(1)
2016	Orlando City B	1	(0)
2017	Tampa Bay Rowdies	12	(0)
2018–2019	Orlando SeaWolves (indoor)	7	(4)
Total		179	(9)

Managerial career
- 2018–: Rollins Tars (assistant)
- * Club domestic league appearances and goals

Luke Boden (born 26 November 1988) is an English retired professional footballer who is an assistant coach for the Rollins College men's soccer team.

== Career ==
=== England ===
Boden made his breakthrough when still a Sheffield Wednesday academy player. He was called up to the senior squad at the start of the 2006–07 season to ease the club's injury problems. He made his debut when he came on as a substitute in the Championship game at Plymouth Argyle on 19 August 2006.

On 18 September 2008 he was loaned out to League Two side Chesterfield for a month. Boden made his debut in the Spireites' 1–2 defeat at Rochdale on 20 September 2008. He played four games for the Spireites before a short loan spell with Rushden & Diamonds.

On 27 August 2009, Boden joined League Two side Northampton Town on a one-month loan deal.

=== United States ===
Boden was released from his contract with Sheffield Wednesday by mutual consent on 26 January 2011, and subsequently moved to play in the United States. He signed a two-year contract with Orlando City of the USL Pro league on 23 February 2011, and made his debut for his new team on 16 April as a second-half substitute in a game against the Charlotte Eagles.

Boden was released by Orlando at the end of the 2016 season, and subsequently signed with USL side Tampa Bay Rowdies on 6 January 2017.

Boden joined the Rollins Tars coaching staff ahead of the 2018 season. He is an assistant coach and the recruiting coordinator.

== Personal ==
Boden holds a U.S. green card which qualifies him as a domestic player for MLS roster purposes.

== Honours ==
=== Orlando City ===
- USL Pro (3): 2011, 2012, 2014
- USL Pro Playoffs (2): 2011, 2013

=== Individual ===
- USL Pro Team of the Season (1): 2014
