= Rob Valentino =

American soccer player

- Valentino with Orlando City in 2014

Personal information
- Date of birth: December 21, 1985 (age 40)
- Place of birth: Hoffman Estates, Illinois, United States
- Height: 6 ft 3 in (1.91 m)
- Position: Defender

College career
Years	Team	Apps	(Gls)
2004–2007	San Francisco Dons	57	(5)

Senior career*
Years	Team	Apps	(Gls)
2007	San Jose Frogs	5	(0)
2008–2009	New England Revolution	0	(0)
2009–2010	Colorado Rapids	0	(0)
2010	FC Tampa Bay	27	(0)
2011–2014	Orlando City	77	(9)
2015	Arizona United	15	(0)
2017	Orlando City B	0	(0)
Total		124	(9)

International career
2008	United States U23	1	(0)

Managerial career
- 2016–2017: Orlando City B (assistant)
- 2018: Atlanta United 2 (assistant)
- 2019–2024: Atlanta United (assistant)
- 2021: Atlanta United (interim)
- 2024: Atlanta United (interim)
- * Club domestic league appearances and goals as of September 18, 2014

Rob Valentino (born December 21, 1985) is an American soccer coach and former soccer player, who was most recently the interim head coach at Major League Soccer side Atlanta United FC.

== Career ==
=== College and amateur ===
Valentino grew up in Danville, California, and began his soccer career playing youth soccer for the local Mustang Club. In 1999, his family moved to Arizona, where he played for the 1986 Sereno Golden Eagles with coach Harry Demos. Valentino was recruited out of high school, and chose to attend the University of San Francisco. Valentino was captain all four years at USF, where he was the WCC Defensive Player of the Year his sophomore season. He also earned WCC Player of the Year honors his junior season.

In addition to playing collegiate soccer, Valentino spent the 2007 season with the San Jose Frogs of the USL Premier Development League. However, he injured his left knee and was set to red-shirt the season, but ultimately decided to sign a generation Adidas contract.

=== Professional ===
Valentino was drafted in the first round, 13th overall, of the 2008 MLS SuperDraft by New England Revolution. He made his full professional debut for Revolution on July 1, 2008, in a US Open Cup third-round game against Richmond Kickers, and was traded to Colorado Rapids in exchange for Nico Colaluca on May 6, 2009. Valentino asked for and was released before the 2010 season to play for Tampa without ever making an MLS appearance.

He signed with FC Tampa Bay of the USSF Division 2 League in 2010, but chose not to re-sign with the club at the end of the season.

He later signed with new USL Pro franchise Orlando City on March 31, 2011; he scored his first career goal on April 16, 2011, in a 1–0 victory over the Charlotte Eagles. In addition Valentino was voted Defensive Player of the year for the 2011 USL season. He also became the captain for Orlando City following his debut season. Valentino played for Orlando City for 5 years, but was not among the Orlando City players to make the move to MLS.

Following Orlando City's move to MLS Valentino signed with Arizona United and was named captain for the team. He started in all 15 games for which he was fit. He missed a month of the season due to injury. Arizona announced that Valentino would retire from playing on August 11, 2015.

=== Coaching ===
On August 11, 2015, Valentino was announced as an assistant coach for Orlando City B who began play in 2016. The USL club is owned by Orlando City SC and reunited Valentino with his former teammate Anthony Pulis who was the team's head coach. He was also named to the club's technical staff.

In 2019 he was added to Frank De Boer's technical staff as an assistant manager to the 2018 MLS Cup-winning team Atlanta United FC.

On July 18, 2021, Valentino was named Atlanta United's interim head coach following the firing of previous head coach Gabriel Heinze. Valentino led Atlanta United to a 4-2-2 record as the caretaker manager. When Gonzalo Pineda was hired as the new head coach on August 12, Valentino was retained as an assistant.

Valentino was again named interim head coach on June 3, 2024, after Atlanta parted ways with Pineda.

== Honors ==
=== Orlando City ===
- USL Pro (2): 2011, 2013
