= Dom Dwyer =

American soccer player (born 1990)

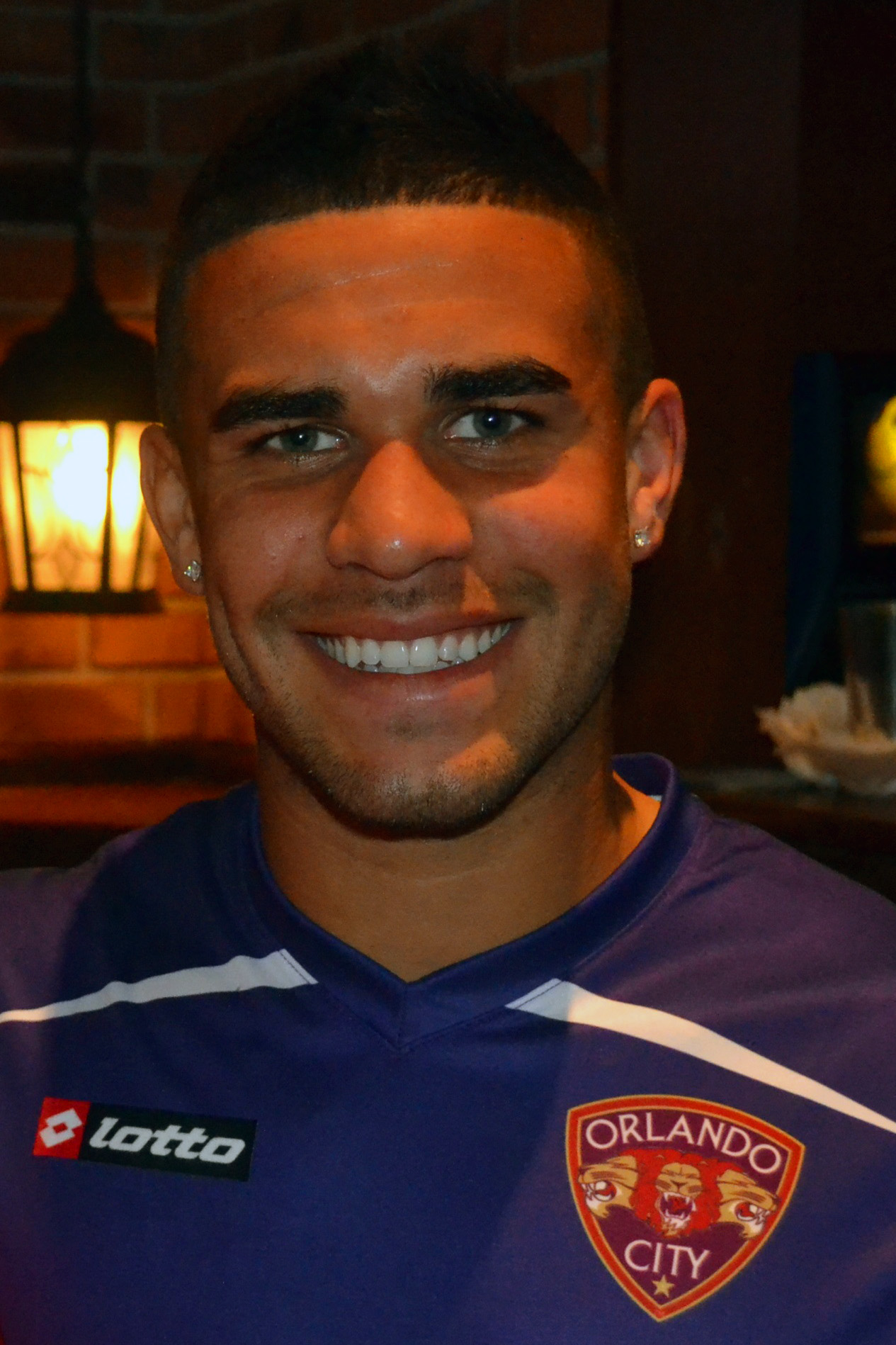
- Dwyer with Orlando City in 2013

Personal information
- Full name: Dominic James Dwyer
- Date of birth: July 30, 1990 (age 36)
- Place of birth: Cuckfield, West Sussex, England
- Height: 5 ft 9 in (1.75 m)
- Position: Forward

Youth career
- 2000–2006: Norwich City
- 2007–2008: Staines Town
- 2008–2009: King's Lynn

College career
Years	Team	Apps	(Gls)
2009–2010	Tyler Apaches	42	(52)
2011	South Florida Bulls	21	(16)

Senior career*
Years	Team	Apps	(Gls)
2012–2017	Sporting Kansas City	128	(57)
2013	→ Orlando City (loan)	13	(15)
2017–2020	Orlando City	67	(24)
2021–2022	Toronto FC	14	(0)
2022–2023	Atlanta United	22	(4)
2024	Oakland Roots	14	(1)
2025–2026	Mansfield Town	24	(5)

International career^{‡}
2017	United States	4	(2)
Medal record
Men's soccer
Representing United States
CONCACAF Gold Cup
Winner	2017
- * Club domestic league appearances and goals as of 2 May 2026 ‡ National team caps and goals as of November 14, 2017

Dominic James Dwyer (born July 30, 1990) is a professional soccer player who plays as a forward. Born in England, he played for the United States national team.

While in England, Dwyer represented, among other teams, Norwich City as a youth. In 2009, he moved to the United States on a soccer scholarship and played for Tyler Junior College and the South Florida Bulls. He was drafted by Sporting Kansas City of Major League Soccer in 2012, and won the MLS Cup with them in 2013. In 2017, he joined Orlando City SC in the largest transfer between two MLS clubs.

Dwyer became an American citizen in March 2017 and was called up to the U.S. national team later that year for the 2017 CONCACAF Gold Cup, winning the tournament.

== College and amateur ==
Dwyer was born in Cuckfield, West Sussex. After the family moved to East Anglia he was spotted playing for King's Lynn Community Football by Jess Ibrom Football Development Officer and invited to the Kings Lynn FC Youth Team, and was then signed into the youth program of Norwich City. Dwyer studied at the College of West Anglia from 2006 to 2008.

After playing for Staines Town for a year, in 2008, Dwyer joined King's Lynn F.C., where he broke his right foot three times. He was then told by doctors that he would never be physically capable of playing at a professional level. Dwyer was given an opportunity by scout Joe McLaughlin of Soccer Icon USA, to get a sports scholarship to study for a college degree in the U.S., Dwyer has said that he accepted the offer to get a free degree and that, at the time, he had given up on the dream of a soccer career.

Dwyer moved from England to attend Tyler Junior College in Texas, where he won two national championships and was the national junior college player of the year after scoring 37 goals as a sophomore. After two years at Tyler, he made the move to the University of South Florida, where he played in 2011.

== Professional career ==
=== Sporting Kansas City ===
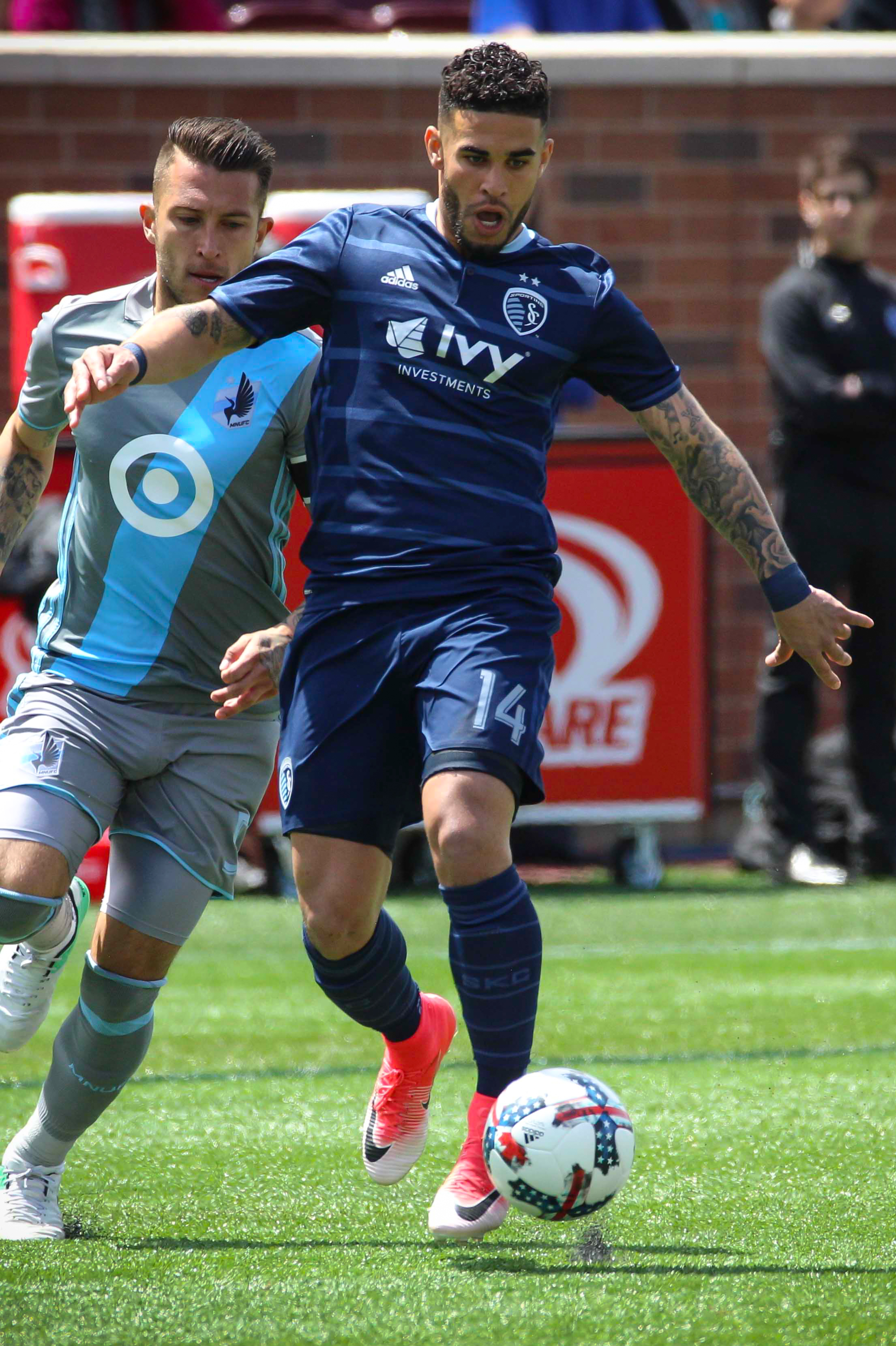
Dwyer playing for Sporting Kansas City in 2017

On January 12, 2012, Dwyer was selected No. 16 overall in the 2012 MLS SuperDraft by Sporting Kansas City. He was first included for a professional game on March 25, remaining an unused substitute in a 2–1 win over FC Dallas at Sporting Park. He made his debut on 29 May in a 3–2 win over Orlando City in the Lamar Hunt U.S. Open Cup third round, playing the first half before being replaced by C. J. Sapong; his team went on to win the tournament, although he played no further part in their run. Dwyer made his MLS debut against Toronto FC on September 2, replacing Sapong for the final four minutes of a 2–1 home win for his only appearance of the regular season; on November 4, he made another substitute appearance in the 2012 MLS Cup Playoffs against the Houston Dynamo, a 2–0 away defeat.

Following the 2012 Major League Soccer season, Dwyer went on trial with Scottish Premier League club St Mirren in hopes of securing a loan to gain playing time. However, on January 3, 2013, it was announced that the proposed loan for Dwyer had been called off by Sporting.

A little over a month later, Dwyer, along with three other teammates, were loaned to USL Pro club Orlando City for the 2013 season as part of the alliance between the two clubs. He made an instant impact for the Lions by tallying two goals and one assist in the club's first three matches. On May 4, 2013, Dwyer scored his first career hat-trick in a 7–2 victory over the Antigua Barracuda. Three weeks later, he scored his 13th goal of the season against the Wilmington Hammerheads, tying the all-time season record in the USL Pro for goals with only 46% of the season played. On June 7, Dwyer scored his 14th goal of the season against Phoenix FC, surpassing Jhonny Arteaga's tally of 13 goals for FC New York in 2011. On June 22, 2013, Dwyer scored the opening goal of an international friendly against Fluminense of Brazil's Série A, an eventual 3–4 loss.

On June 27, 2013, Dwyer was recalled by Sporting the morning after Orlando's US Open Cup defeat to Chicago Fire SC. On August 3, he scored his first goal in MLS against the New York Red Bulls in the second minute of stoppage time, albeit in a 2–3 home loss. Five days later, Dwyer made his debut in the CONCACAF Champions League for Sporting. In the 75th minute, he scored to give Sporting a 2–0 lead against Nicaraguan outfit, Real Esteli. Coming back for one more game with Orlando City on September 7, Dwyer scored four goals, a club record for one game, against the Charlotte Eagles in the 2013 USL Pro Championship, leading the Lions to a 7–4 victory.

On November 23, 2013, Dwyer scored the winning goal for Sporting Kansas City in the Eastern Conference Final against Houston to lead them to the MLS Cup. He was substituted for Claudio Bieler after 72 minutes of the championship game on December 7, which his team won 7–6 in a penalty shootout.

=== Orlando City ===
On July 25, 2017, Dwyer was traded from Sporting Kansas City to Orlando City, the MLS successor to the USL team he had previously been loaned to, in exchange for US$900,000 in guaranteed allocation funds (split between general and targeted), as well as up to US$700,000 in future allocation funds based on his performance. This set the record for most expensive transfer in the league to date.

Four days after his transfer, Dwyer made his Orlando debut by starting in a 1–1 tie at Atlanta United. He scored his first two goals on September 16 against the same opponents, also assisting Cyle Larin as the game ended 3–3. On August 3, he played the second half of the 2017 MLS All-Star Game against Real Madrid at Soldier Field, in which he scored a late equalizer for a 1–1 tie but missed his attempt as his team lost on penalties.

Dwyer signed a three-year contract extension with Orlando City on January 3, 2018. He led the team in goals in 2018 with 13 as Orlando finished last in the Eastern Conference and ahead of only San Jose in the overall standings.

Dwyer began the 2020 season injured, missing the opening two matches before the season was temporarily suspended by the COVID-19 pandemic. He recovered by the time play resumed in June via the MLS is Back Tournament and started in the opening two group games, substituting off around the 60-minute mark in both in a bid to manage his workload. However, his injury reoccurred, forcing him to undergo arthroscopic knee surgery which ended his season. On December 2, the club announced he would be leaving upon the expiration of his contract at the end of the year.

=== Toronto FC ===
On May 11, 2021, he signed with Toronto FC through the end of the 2022 season.

On January 10, 2022, Toronto FC traded the forward, along with the No. 3 pick in the 2022 SuperDraft, to FC Dallas, in exchange for $50,000 in general allocation money, with Dallas immediately buying out Dwyer's contract.

=== Atlanta United ===
In 2022, Dwyer went on trial with MLS club Atlanta United. In February, it was announced that he would sign a two-year deal with the club. On February 27, just about a week after inking his deal with Atlanta, Dwyer was subbed on for Luiz Araújo due to a hamstring injury in the 22nd minute, and scored his first MLS goal in 2 seasons against Sporting Kansas City, as he contributed to Atlanta's 3–1 win in the season opener. Dwyer was waived by Atlanta on January 6, 2023.

=== Oakland Roots ===
After being without a club for the 2023 season, Dwyer signed for USL Championship club Oakland Roots in April 2024.

=== Mansfield Town ===
On March 8, 2025, Dwyer returned to England, joining League One side Mansfield Town on a short-term deal until the end of the season. He was offered a new contract in May 2025. Dwyer was released by Mansfield at the end of the 2025-26 season.

== International career ==
Born in England, Dwyer moved to the United States in 2009 and gained U.S. citizenship after eight years of residence in March 2017. Following his naturalization, Dwyer was called up by the United States men's national team on June 3, 2017, as part of their 40-man preliminary roster for the 2017 Gold Cup.

On June 25, 2017, Dwyer was named to the final 23-man Gold Cup roster for the United States men's national team. Dwyer scored in his first cap in a 2–1 friendly victory over Ghana on July 1, 2017. He scored again in his second cap on July 8, 2017, in the U.S.'s first match of the Gold Cup, a 1–1 tie with Panama, making him only the ninth player in USMNT history to score two goals in as many appearances. He was one of six players replaced in the roster after the conclusion of the group stage of the tournament on July 16.

== Personal life ==
Dwyer received his U.S. green card in 2012. In January 2015, he married Sydney Leroux in a private ceremony, announcing it on February 14 on their social media. Their son, Cassius Cruz Dwyer, was born in September 2016. On March 17, 2017, Dwyer became an American citizen. Their daughter, Roux James Dwyer, was born on June 28, 2019. On August 6, 2021, Leroux announced on social media that she and Dwyer were divorcing.

== Career statistics ==
=== Club ===
As of match played 8 April 2025

Appearances and goals by club, season and competition
Club	Season	League			National cup (Note: Includes U.S. Open Cup, Canadian Championship, FA Cup)		League cup (Note: Includes EFL Cup)		Continental		Other		Total	
Club	Season	Division	Apps	Goals	Apps	Goals	Apps	Goals	Apps	Goals	Apps	Goals	Apps	Goals
Sporting Kansas City	2012	MLS	1	0	1	0	—		—		1 (Note: Appearance(s) in MLS Cup playoffs)	0	3	0
Sporting Kansas City	2013	MLS	16	2	0	0	—		6 (Note: Appearance(s) in CONCACAF Champions Cup)	1	5	1	27	4
Sporting Kansas City	2014	MLS	33	22	2	0	—		3	1	1	1	39	24
Sporting Kansas City	2015	MLS	30	12	5	5	—		—		1	0	36	17
Sporting Kansas City	2016	MLS	33	16	2	0	—		0	0	1	0	36	16
Sporting Kansas City	2017	MLS	15	5	1	1	—		—		0	0	16	6
Sporting Kansas City	Total		128	57	11	6	—		9	2	9	2	157	67
Orlando City (loan)	2013	USL Pro	13	15	2	3	—		—		0	0	15	8
Orlando City (loan)	2013	USL Pro	0	0	0	0	—		—		1 (Note: Appearance(s) in USL Pro play-offs)	4	1	4
Orlando City	2017	MLS	12	4	0	0	—		—		—		12	4
Orlando City	2018	MLS	26	13	1	0	—		—		—		27	13
Orlando City	2019	MLS	27	7	2	0	—		—		—		29	2
Orlando City	2020	MLS	2	0	—		—		—		0	0	2	0
Orlando City	Total		67	24	3	0	—		—		0	0	70	24
Toronto FC	2021	MLS	14	0	1	0	—		0	0	—		15	0
Atlanta United	2022	MLS	22	4	2	2	—		—		—		24	6
Oakland Roots	2024	USL Championship	14	1	0	0	—		—		1 (Note: Appearance(s) in USL Championship play-offs)	0	15	1
Mansfield Town	2024-25	League One	9	4	0	0	0	0	—		0	0	9	4
Career total			267	105	19	11	0	0	9	2	11	6	306	124

=== International ===
Appearances and goals by national team and year
National team	Year	Apps	Goals
United States	2017	4	2
Total		4	2

Scores and results list United States' goal tally first, score column indicates score after each Dwyer goal.

List of international goals scored by Dom Dwyer
No.	Date	Venue	Opponent	Score	Result	Competition	Ref.
1	1 July 2017	Pratt & Whitney Stadium at Rentschler Field, East Hartford, United States	Ghana	1–0	2–1	Friendly	
2	8 July 2017	Nissan Stadium, Nashville, United States	Panama	1–0	1–1	2017 CONCACAF Gold Cup	

== Honors ==
Sporting Kansas City

- MLS Cup: 2013
- U.S. Open Cup: 2012, 2015
- Eastern Conference (Playoffs): 2013

United States

- CONCACAF Gold Cup: 2017
