= Freddie Braun =

American soccer player

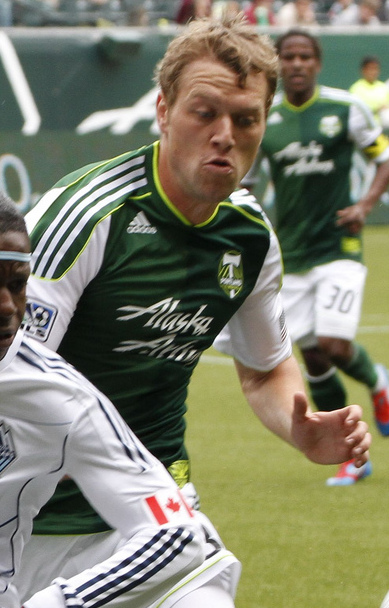

Personal information
- Full name: Freddie Braun
- Date of birth: May 13, 1988 (age 38)
- Place of birth: Royal Oak, Michigan, United States
- Height: 5 ft 10 in (1.78 m)
- Position: Midfielder

Team information
- Current team: FC Mulhouse Portland

Youth career
- 2006–2009: Louisville Cardinals

Senior career*
Years	Team	Apps	(Gls)
2009	Chicago Fire Premier	14	(3)
2010	Portland Timbers U23s	16	(5)
2011–2012	Portland Timbers	3	(0)
2013	Orlando City	22	(2)
2014	San Antonio Scorpions	1	(0)
2019–	FC Mulhouse Portland	0	(0)
- * Club domestic league appearances and goals as of 13 May 2019

Freddie Braun (born May 13, 1988, in Royal Oak, Michigan) is an American soccer player who currently plays for FC Mulhouse Portland in the National Premier Soccer League.

== Career ==
=== College and amateur ===
Braun grew up in Rochester Hills, Michigan, attended Rochester High School, and played club soccer for the Michigan Wolves before going on to play four years of college soccer at the University of Louisville. As a senior in 2009 he captained the Cardinals to a 13–3–4 record and a third consecutive NCAA tournament appearance. Braun was the team's second-leading scorer in 2009, recording eight goals and four assists in his senior campaign, and finished his collegiate career with 11 goals and five assists in 81 games.

During his college years Braun also played for Chicago Fire Premier in the USL Premier Development League.

Upon the completion of his senior college season, he was one of 62 collegiate players invited to participate in the 2010 MLS Player Combine, but was not drafted; having been unable to secure a professional contract elsewhere, Braun instead decided to return to the PDL, and signed for the Portland Timbers U23s as an overage player. He helped Portland to a perfect 16–0–0 season and the PDL National Championship in 2010, and was selected to the PDL All-League team.

=== Professional ===
After training with the team throughout pre-season, Braun signed with the Portland Timbers of Major League Soccer on February 17, 2011. He made his professional debut on May 3, 2011, in a 1–0 loss to the San Jose Earthquakes in the Lamar Hunt U.S. Open Cup.

Braun was released by Portland on November 19, 2012.

Braun signed with USL Pro club Orlando City on March 8, 2013.
