= Anthony Pulis =

Footballer (born 1984)

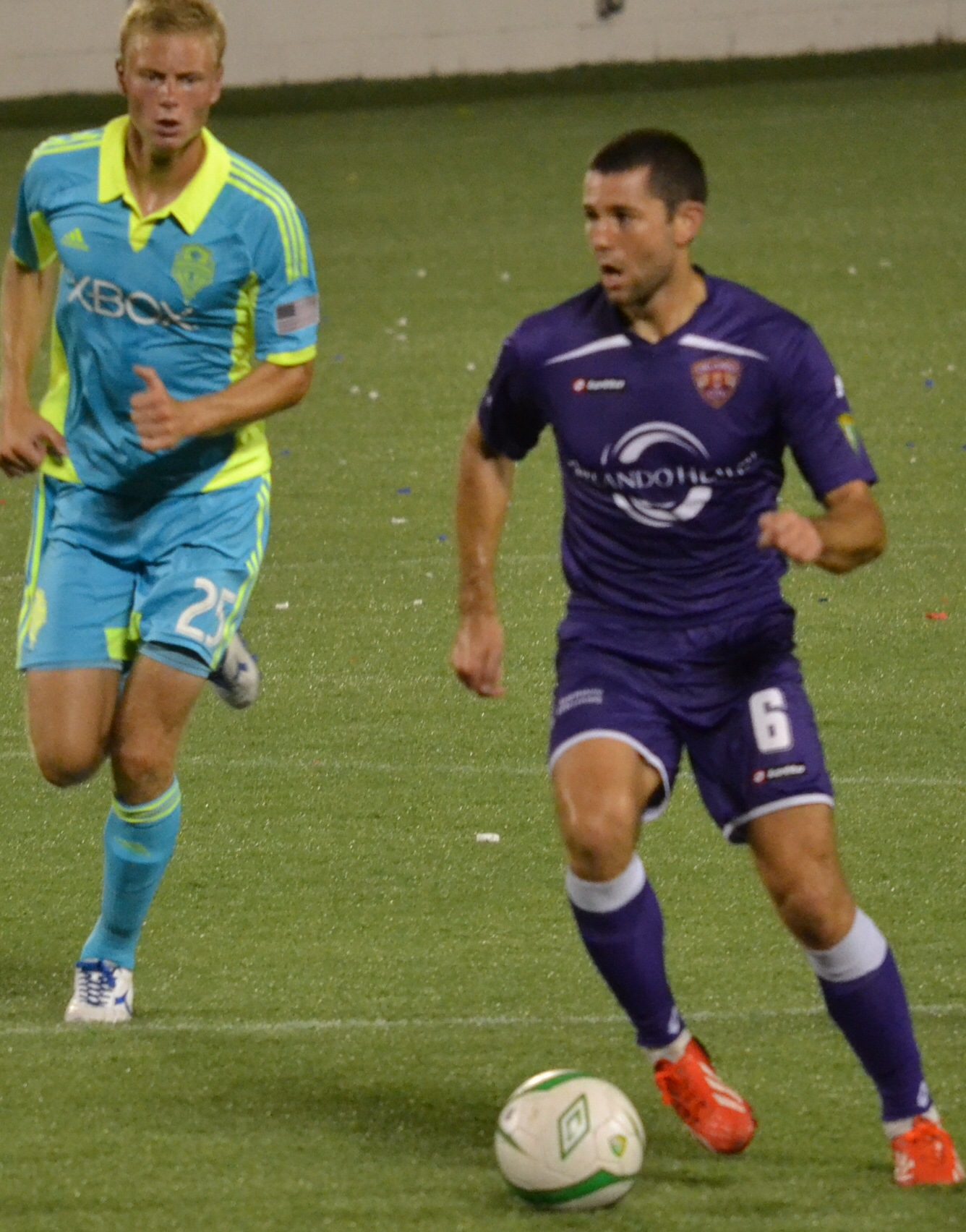
- Pulis (right) playing for Orlando City in 2013

Personal information
- Full name: Anthony James Pulis
- Date of birth: 21 July 1984 (age 42)
- Place of birth: Bristol, England
- Height: 5 ft 10 in (1.78 m)
- Position: Midfielder

Youth career
- ?–2002: Portsmouth

Senior career*
Years	Team	Apps	(Gls)
2002–2004	Portsmouth	0	(0)
2004–2008	Stoke City	2	(0)
2004–2005	→ Torquay United (loan)	3	(0)
2006	→ Plymouth Argyle (loan)	5	(0)
2006–2007	→ Grimsby Town (loan)	9	(0)
2008	→ Bristol Rovers (loan)	1	(0)
2008–2011	Southampton	0	(0)
2009–2010	→ Lincoln City (loan)	7	(0)
2010–2011	→ Stockport County (loan)	10	(1)
2011	→ Barnet (loan)	4	(0)
2011–2012	Aldershot Town	5	(0)
2012–2014	Orlando City	44	(4)
Total		90	(5)

International career
2005	Wales U21	4	(0)

Managerial career
- 2016–2017: Orlando City B
- 2018–2019: Saint Louis FC
- 2020: Inter Miami CF (assistant)
- 2021–2023: Miami FC
- 2024–: Real Salt Lake (assistant)
- * Club domestic league appearances and goals

Anthony James Pulis (born 21 July 1984) is a Welsh football coach and former player. He is an assistant coach for Major League Soccer club Real Salt Lake.

A journeyman for much of his career Pulis represented Portsmouth, Stoke City, Torquay United, Plymouth Argyle, Grimsby Town, Bristol Rovers, Southampton, Lincoln City, Stockport County, Barnet and Aldershot Town during 10 years spent playing in England before moving abroad and establishing himself in the USL Pro with Orlando City. He made four appearances for the Wales under-21 team, but did not represent his country at senior level.

== Club career ==
=== Portsmouth ===
Bristol-born Pulis began his career in 2000 as a trainee with Portsmouth whilst his father Tony managed the club. Despite his father's sacking after only 10 months in charge, Anthony stayed at Fratton Park, turning professional in July 2002 under Harry Redknapp. He made just one first team appearance for Pompey as a substitute in the 2–0 League Cup win away to Cardiff City on 9 November 2004.

=== Stoke City ===
In December 2004, after failing to make an impact on the Portsmouth first team, Anthony Pulis and teammate Lewis Buxton each signed two-and-a-half-year contracts with Stoke City.

Almost immediately after his arrival at Stoke, Anthony joined Torquay United on loan, making his league debut as a first-half substitute for Alex Russell as Torquay lost 2–1 at home to Stockport County on 1 January 2005. However his appearances were limited and his loan spell was cut short.

Pulis once again found his first team opportunities scarce after his father was dismissed and replaced by Johan Boskamp prior to the 2005–06 season. Towards the end of the 2005–06 season he was loaned to Plymouth Argyle, linking up with his father for the third time in his career.

After his loan spell, Pulis returned to the Britannia Stadium for the 2006–07 season. He moved, along with Martin Paterson, to Grimsby Town on loan on 23 November 2006. However, he made only nine appearances before his loan spell was cut short due to injury. In his second-last appearance, he was substituted at half-time as Grimsby suffered a 4–0 loss to Rochdale.

The 2007–08 season started brightly for Pulis. He gained his first assist for the club, as his corner set up a Jon Parkin header in a 3–2 defeat to Southampton, however injury problems kept him sidelined for several months thereafter. He was loaned out again, on this occasion to Bristol Rovers, however he made only one appearance for the club before his loan spell was curtailed due to another injury. In his only appearance for the club, a 14-minute cameo in a 2–0 defeat to Doncaster Rovers, Pulis conceded a penalty kick and was booked.

=== Southampton ===
In August 2008 Pulis moved to Southampton on a two-year contract a free transfer.

He joined League Two team Lincoln City on one-month loan in October 2009 making his debut on 10 October in a 1–0 away win against Macclesfield Town. Pulis became an instant first team regular at Lincoln but left the club when his loan contract expired on 7 January 2010. He had spent the previous six weeks on the injured list.

In October 2010, he joined Stockport County on loan for a month and made his debut for the club on 9 October 2010 in a match against Gillingham, a club his father managed, in which he scored a consolation goal for Stockport. The loan was extended into a second and third month.

Pulis joined Barnet on loan in February 2011 but was sent off 29 minutes into his debut, a 3–0 defeat at home to Torquay United.

Anthony Pulis was released by Southampton on 21 May 2011, without making a first team appearances.

=== Aldershot Town ===
At the start of August 2011, it was announced that Pulis had signed for League Two side Aldershot Town, on a one-year contract. He went on to make five league and two League Cup appearances for the club.

=== Orlando City ===
In January 2012 Pulis joined USL Pro side Orlando City. He scored his first goal for the Lions against the Richmond Kickers in a 2–0 win. In his three seasons at Orlando, the club won one USL Pro Championship and two Commissioner's Cups.

Pulis was a player-coach during his three years playing for Orlando and at the end of the 2014 season he announced his retirement from playing to move into coaching full-time.

== Coaching career ==
=== Orlando City B ===
On 15 October 2015, after spending one year as an assistant coach with Orlando City in MLS, Pulis was announced as the head coach of USL Championship club Orlando City B.

=== Saint Louis FC ===
On 20 November 2017, Pulis stepped down as the head coach of Orlando City B and signed as a head-coach with Saint Louis FC. Pulis spent two seasons with Saint Louis FC. They qualified for the USL play-offs in his first year, for the first time in club history then they made history again the following season by reaching the US Open Cup Quarter Finals, after beating MLS opponents Chicago Fire and FC Cincinnati on the way. Pulis finished with a record of 30–25–20 (W-L-D).

=== Inter Miami CF ===
On 1 March 2020, Inter Miami CF announced Pulis as an assistant coach. Pulis worked alongside Diego Alonso in 2020 then Phil Neville in 2021.

=== Miami FC ===
On 29 November 2021, Pulis was announced as the new head coach of Miami FC. After qualifying for the USL play-offs in 2022 under Pulis, Miami FC lost in the quarter-finals to Tampa Bay Rowdies. After a short tenure as Miami head coach, Pulis stepped down on 20 June 2023 to pursue other opportunities. Pulis finished with a record of 19–16–17 (W-L-D).

=== Real Salt Lake ===
On 16 January 2024, it was announced that Pulis had joined Real Salt Lake's coaching staff as an assistant to head coach Pablo Mastroeni.

== Personal life ==
Pulis is a Catholic and regularly attends church. He is the son of Welsh football manager Tony Pulis and the nephew of former footballer Ray Pulis.

== Career statistics ==
- Sourced from Soccerbase.com

Appearances and goals by club, season and competition
Club	Season	League			FA Cup		League Cup		Other^{[A]}		Total	
Club	Season	Division	Apps	Goals	Apps	Goals	Apps	Goals	Apps	Goals	Apps	Goals
Portsmouth	2004–05	Premier League	0	0	0	0	1	0	0	0	1	0
Stoke City	2004–05	Championship	0	0	0	0	0	0	0	0	0	0
Stoke City	2005–06	Championship	0	0	0	0	0	0	0	0	0	0
Stoke City	2006–07	Championship	1	0	0	0	1	0	0	0	2	0
Stoke City	2007–08	Championship	1	0	2	0	1	0	0	0	4	0
Torquay United (loan)	2004–05	League One	3	0	0	0	0	0	0	0	3	0
Plymouth Argyle (loan)	2005–06	Championship	5	0	0	0	0	0	0	0	5	0
Grimsby Town (loan)	2006–07	League Two	9	0	0	0	0	0	0	0	9	0
Bristol Rovers (loan)	2007–08	League One	1	0	0	0	0	0	0	0	1	0
Southampton	2008–09	Championship	0	0	0	0	0	0	0	0	0	0
Southampton	2009–10	League One	0	0	0	0	0	0	0	0	0	0
Southampton	2010–11	League One	0	0	0	0	0	0	0	0	0	0
Lincoln City (loan)	2009–10	League Two	7	0	1	0	0	0	0	0	8	0
Stockport County (loan)	2010–11	League Two	10	1	2	0	0	0	1	0	13	1
Barnet (loan)	2010–11	League Two	4	0	0	0	0	0	0	0	4	0
Aldershot Town	2011–12	League Two	5	0	0	0	2	0	1	0	8	0
Orlando City	2012	USL Pro	15	2	1	0	—		—		6	2
Orlando City	2013	USL Pro	17	1	3	0	—		—		20	1
Orlando City	2014	USL Pro	12	1	3	0	—		—		15	1
Career Total			90	5	12	0	5	0	2	0	109	5

A. The "Other" column constitutes appearances and goals in the Football League Trophy.
