= Brian Fekete =

American soccer player (born 1990)

Personal information
- Full name: Brian Fekete
- Date of birth: January 26, 1990 (age 36)
- Place of birth: Plant City, Florida, United States
- Height: 1.85 m (6 ft 1 in)
- Position: Defender

College career
| Years | Team | Apps | (Gls) |
| 2009–2012 | Tampa Spartans | 73 | (7) |

Senior career*
| Years | Team | Apps | (Gls) |
| 2010 | Bradenton Academics | 5 | (1) |
| 2011–2012 | GPS Portland Phoenix | 29 | (2) |
| 2013 | Orlando City | 7 | (0) |
| 2014 | Pittsburgh Riverhounds | 11 | (2) |
| 2015 | Austin Aztex | 0 | (0) |
- * Club domestic league appearances and goals as of September 17, 2014

Brian Fekete (born January 26, 1990) is an American soccer player who played as a defender for Austin Aztex in USL Pro.

== Career ==
=== College and amateur ===
Fekete played his college soccer career at the University of Tampa from 2009 through 2012. He also played in the USL Premier Development League with Bradenton Academics in 2010 and GPS Portland Phoenix in 2011 and 2012. He was also a pick in the MLS Draft but wasn't selected for the team

=== Professional ===
Fekete joined Orlando City in USL Pro as a trialist following the end of his 2012 collegiate season, and played in several of their preseason friendlies. He was signed to the team on March 1, 2013.

Fekete saw his first competitive action on May 14, 2013, when he started in Orlando City's third round match in the 2013 Lamar Hunt U.S. Open Cup against Ocala Stampede. He played his first league match on June 9, 2013, against Antigua Barracuda FC.

On March 3, 2014, Fekete announced on Twitter he will be playing for the Pittsburgh Riverhounds for the 2014 USL Pro season.
