= Oumar Diakhité =

Senegalese footballer

Personal information
- Date of birth: 9 December 1993 (age 32)
- Place of birth: Kédougou, Senegal
- Height: 1.90 m (6 ft 3 in)
- Position: Centre-back

Youth career
- 2009–2012: Montverde Academy

Senior career*
| Years | Team | Apps | (Gls) |
| 2012 | Orlando City U-23 | 15 | (4) |
| 2013 | Orlando City | 1 | (0) |
| 2013–2016 | Olhanense | 63 | (4) |
| 2015–2016 | → Estoril (loan) | 11 | (1) |
| 2016–2019 | Estoril | 38 | (0) |
| 2017–2018 | → Kazma (loan) | | |
| 2019–2020 | Sepsi OSK | 3 | (0) |
| 2020 | Aves | 16 | (0) |
| 2021 | Eintracht Braunschweig | 17 | (0) |
| 2021–2023 | SV Sandhausen | 11 | (0) |
| 2023–2024 | VfL Osnabrück | 19 | (1) |
| 2024–2025 | AaB | 13 | (0) |
- * Club domestic league appearances and goals as of 29 May 2025

Oumar Diakhité (born 9 December 1993) is a Senegalese professional footballer who plays as a centre-back.

== Career ==
=== College and amateur ===
Diakhité emigrated to the United States from Senegal, where he attended an academy run by the former Senegal international Salif Diao, to advance his football career. He joined Montverde Academy, a preparatory school in Montverde, Florida, as a junior in 2011. In 2012, he spent a season with Orlando City U-23 of the USL Premier Development League. He played 15 regular-season games, and scored four goals in that time.

=== Professional ===
Diakhité bypassed college, and trialed with Orlando City of USL Pro in the 2013 preseason. He started several matches, including the home leg of a home-and-away friendly series with the Tampa Bay Rowdies.

Diakhité was signed by Orlando City on 4 April 2013. He saw his first competitive action on 14 May 2013, when he started in Orlando City's third round match in the 2013 Lamar Hunt U.S. Open Cup against Ocala Stampede. He played his first league match on 9 June 2013, against Antigua Barracuda FC.

In July 2013, Diakhité went to Olhanense on trial from Orlando City. On 1 August, he was officially transferred to Olhanense for an undisclosed fee.

On 10 July 2019, Diakhité signed a two-year contract with Liga I side Sepsi OSK. On 10 January 2020, he was released by Sepsi OSK.

In January 2021, after trialling with Eintracht Braunschweig, Diakhité joined the 2. Bundesliga club on a contract until summer 2022.

On 4 August 2023, Diakhité signed with 2. Bundesliga club VfL Osnabrück.

On 20 July 2024, newly promoted Danish Superliga club AaB confirmed that they had signed Diakhité on a deal until June 2026. His contract was terminated by mutual agreement on 11 June 2025 following AaB's relegation.
