= Renan Boufleur =

Brazilian footballer

Personal information
- Full name: Renan Felipe Boufleur
- Date of birth: 4 January 1990 (age 36)
- Place of birth: Itapiranga, Santa Catarina, Brazil
- Height: 1.87 m (6 ft 2 in)
- Position: Defender

Youth career
- Santos
- 2009–2011: Anderlecht

Senior career*
Years	Team	Apps	(Gls)
2011–2012	Anderlecht	0	(0)
2011–2012	→ Union Saint-Gilloise (loan)	43	(2)
2012	Oeste	0	(0)
2013	Phoenix FC	14	(0)
2013	→ Orlando City (loan)	16	(3)
- * Club domestic league appearances and goals

Renan Felipe Boufleur (born January 4, 1990) is a Brazilian footballer.

== Career ==
=== Early career ===
Boufleur began his professional career with Santos FC of the Brazilian Serie A before signing as a youth player for R.S.C. Anderlecht in 2009. While with Anderlecht, Baufleur was loaned out to Royale Union Saint-Gilloise for two seasons of the Belgian Third Division B.

=== Phoenix ===
On 5 February 2012, it was announced that Boufleur had signed with new USL Pro expansion franchise Phoenix FC. Then, on 23 March 2013 Boufleur made his debut for the team in the team's very first game against Los Angeles Blues in which the team lost 2–0.

== Career statistics ==
=== Club ===
Statistics accurate as of 24 March 2013

Club	Season	League		US Open Cup		Other		CONCACAF		Total	
Club	Season	Apps	Goals	Apps	Goals	Apps	Goals	Apps	Goals	Apps	Goals
Phoenix	2013	13	0	1	0	0	0	—	—	14	0
Orlando	2013	4	0	0	0	0	0	—	—	4	0
Career total		17	0	0	0	0	0	0	0	18	0
