= Fejiro Okiomah =

American soccer player

Personal information
- Date of birth: November 10, 1990 (age 35)
- Place of birth: Austin, Texas, United States
- Height: 1.87 m (6 ft 2 in)
- Position: Defender

Youth career
- Lonestar SC

College career
Years	Team	Apps	(Gls)
2009–2012	High Point Panthers	80	(19)

Senior career*
Years	Team	Apps	(Gls)
2009–2012	Carolina Dynamo	42	(4)
2013	Charlotte Eagles	26	(0)
2014	Indy Eleven	14	(0)
2015	Pittsburgh Riverhounds	21	(1)
2016	San Antonio FC	15	(2)
- * Club domestic league appearances and goals as of October 5, 2016

Fejiro Okiomah (born November 10, 1990) is an American soccer player. He is the brother of fellow professional soccer player Karo Okiomah.

== Career ==
=== College and amateur ===
Okiomah played four years of college soccer at High Point University. During his time at college, Okiomah also played for USL PDL club Carolina Dynamo from 2009 to 2012.

=== Professional career ===
Okiomah signed with USL Pro club Charlotte Eagles in April 2013. In his first professional season Okiomah appeared in 26 league matches for the Eagles.
