= Dennis Chin =

Jamaican footballer (born 1987)

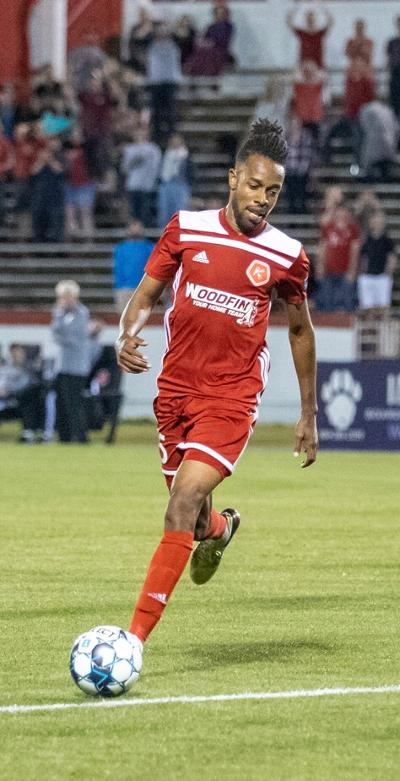
- Chin playing for the Richmond Kickers 2019

Personal information
- Full name: Dennis Chin
- Date of birth: 4 June 1987 (age 39)
- Place of birth: Kingston, Jamaica
- Height: 1.85 m (6 ft 1 in)
- Position: Forward

College career
Years	Team	Apps	(Gls)
2005–2009	Rollins	62	(22)

Senior career*
Years	Team	Apps	(Gls)
2005–2010	Central Florida Kraze	56	(10)
2011–2014	Orlando City	84	(22)
2013	→ San Antonio Scorpions (loan)	5	(0)
2015	Arizona United	20	(3)
2016	Ottawa Fury FC	15	(1)
2016–2017	Ironi Nesher	29	(5)
2018	Pittsburgh Riverhounds SC	5	(0)
2019	Richmond Kickers	23	(5)
- * Club domestic league appearances and goals as of 21 October 2019

Dennis Chin (born 4 June 1987) is a Jamaican former professional footballer who played as a forward, notably for Orlando City SC. He is currently the President of Global Soccer at Young Money APAA Sports, an agency led by rapper Lil' Wayne and Adie Von Gontard, whose great-grandfather founded Anheuser-Busch.

== Club career ==
=== Youth and college ===
Chin was born in Kingston, Jamaica to a Jamaican mother and a Chinese Jamaican father. He moved to the US when he was ten and attended Oviedo High School, before playing college soccer at Rollins College from 2005 through 2009. He scored 7 goals and 3 assists in each of his junior and senior years (2008 and 2009). During his time at Rollins, he also played for the Central Florida Kraze of the USL Premier Development League from 2005 to 2010.

=== Orlando City ===
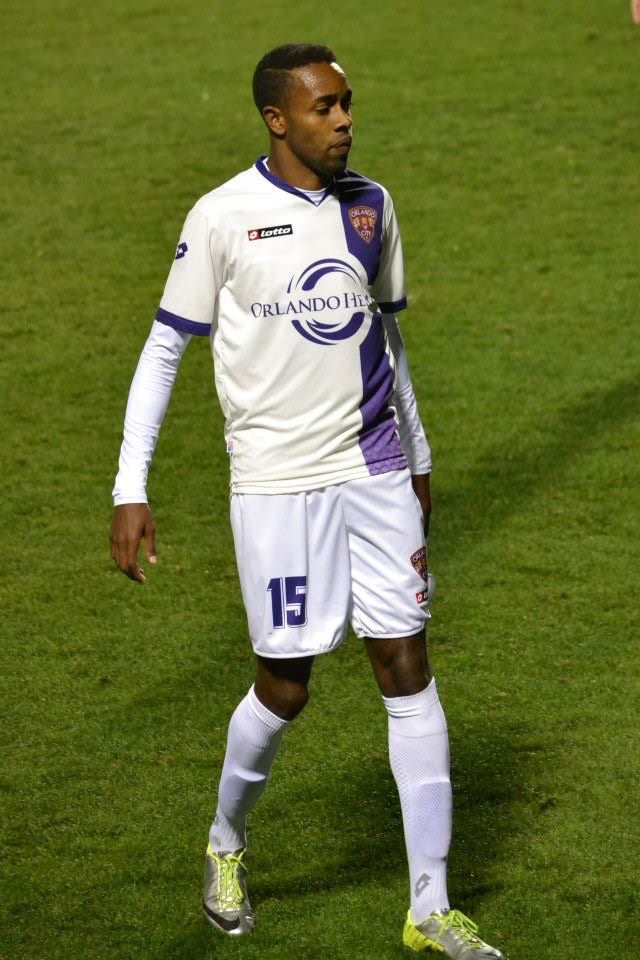
Chin playing for Orlando City in 2014

Chin signed with Orlando City of the USL Professional Division in 2011. He made his professional debut on 14 May 2011, coming on as a second-half substitute in a 1–0 win over the Pittsburgh Riverhounds. He then scored a goal and provided two assists in their first round match in the 2011 Lamar Hunt US Open Cup, in a 4–0 win over ASC New Stars. After spending the early portion of the 2011 season learning Orlando City Head Coach Adrian Heath's system, Chin came alive in the later part of the campaign and became known as the super-sub. As a result, the speedster ended his rookie season with four goals, two of which came during the Lions' memorable three-game playoff run, which saw the club secure its first USL PRO Championship.

In December 2011, Orlando signed Chin to a contract extension through the 2014 season.

Moving into his second season, Chin's confident play towards the end of his rookie year certainly carried over into his second term with the club. Dennis transitioned from his super-sub role, held in year one, to become the primary goal-scorer for the Lions. Chin's first goal came just three minutes into their first game of the season against the Charlotte Eagles and would set the tone for the kind of year he was about to embark on.

All season long, Chin's pace and finishing ability caused problems for opposing teams' back lines and led to the striker scoring 11 goals during league play, which was a team record. Those 11 goals were also good for the best in the league and saw Chin finish as USL Golden Boot and Scoring Champion (27 points) of the USL Pro in only his second season as a professional. In addition, Chin also notched three assists during league play and also scored in the Lamar Hunt US Open Cup against Major League Soccer Club Sporting Kansas City.

Chin's impressive play led to the Oviedo native being named to the USL Pro All-League first team, while also being nominated for USL Pro Most Valuable Player (MVP) and Central Florida Athlete of the Year. Dennis also accepted invitations to train with MLS sides Chicago Fire and D.C. United during the 2012 off-season.

In his third year with Orlando City, Chin was once again an integral part of the Lions' Championship run. After notching five goals and five assists in the regular season, Chin was lethal in the playoffs and recorded four goals and three assists, in three games played, leading the USL Pro playoffs in both categories. Two of those four goals were scored in the USL Pro Championship match and helped Orlando City secure its second USL Pro title, after being upset by the Wilmington Hammerheads in the year prior. He left the club upon the conclusion of the 2014 season, before the club's transition to Major League Soccer.

=== Arizona United ===
After exploring some opportunities in Europe, Chin ultimately signed with another USL team, Arizona United SC. He ended up scoring in the first two matches of 2015.

=== Ottawa Fury ===
In December 2015, Chin signed with Canadian NASL club Ottawa Fury FC. Playing in multiple different positions, Chin scored one goal for Ottawa in 17 appearances in all competitions, including seven starts.

=== Ironi Nesher ===
On August 26, 2016, he was transferred to recently promoted Israeli second division club Ironi Nesher. He helped Nesher to avoid relegation, leading the club in goals and assists.

=== Pittsburgh Riverhounds SC ===
On February 23, 2018, Chin joined the Pittsburgh Riverhounds SC of the United Soccer League. After missing the start of the year with injury, Chin helped the Riverhounds to the 2018 USL Championship Playoffs.

=== Richmond Kickers ===
On January 7, 2019, Chin joined the Richmond Kickers of the USL League One as a player/assistant coach.

== Personal life ==
Chin's great-grandparents came from Guangdong, China and they are Hakka. His last name is the Hakka variant of 陈 (corresponding to the Cantonese Chan and Mandarin Chen). After retiring from professional soccer, Chin started his own Sports Agency, CHYN, that was acquired by Young Money APAA Sports in 2024. He is married and has two children.

== Honours ==
Orlando City SC

- USL Championship 2011
- USL Championship Supporters Shield 2011
- USL Championship Supporters Shield 2012
- USL Championship Golden Boot 2012
- USL Championship First Team All-League 2012
- USL Championship MVP Candidate 2012
- Central Florida Athlete of the Year Nominee 2012
- USL Championship 2013
- USL Championship Supporters Shield 2014
