= All-time Austin Aztex FC roster =

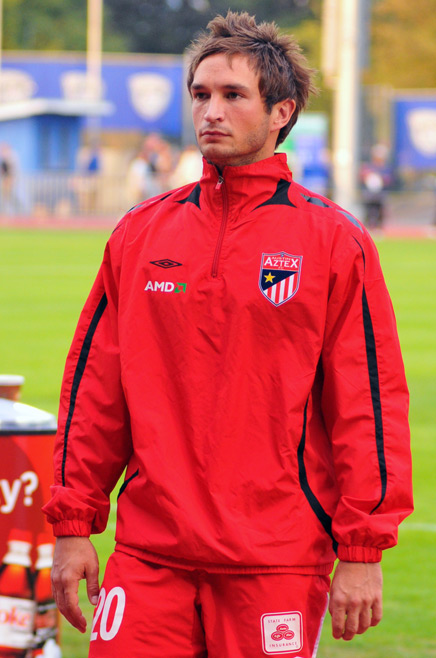
Ryan McMahen made thirty appearances for the Aztex in the team's inaugural season, the most of any player.

Austin Aztex FC was an American soccer club based in Austin, Texas that was founded in 2008 by Phil Rawlins, a British entrepreneur. The Aztex began playing competitive soccer in the United Soccer Leagues (USL) First Division in the 2009 season and shared an affiliation agreement with Rawlins' hometown club, Stoke City, enabling the two clubs to exchange players and the English club to scout players and hold training camps in the US. Austin's first USL match was against the Minnesota Thunder on April 18, 2009. In the 2010 season, the team played its home games at House Park, which replaced Nelson Field as the club's home facility, and competed in the USSF Division 2 Professional League, a temporary league set up by the United States Soccer Federation (USSF) to resolve a dispute between the USL and the proposed new North American Soccer League. The franchise relocated to Florida and became Orlando City SC at the conclusion of the 2010 season.

Forty-nine players participated in at least one league match for the Aztex. This total consists of forty-five outfield players and four goalkeepers. Eddie Johnson holds the records for the most appearances and goals for the club, having played fifty times and scored twenty goals.

== Players ==
Players who were contracted to the club but never played a USL game are not listed. All statistics are for USL regular season games only.

Key

GK	Goalkeeper
DF	Defender
MF	Midfielder
FW	Forward/striker

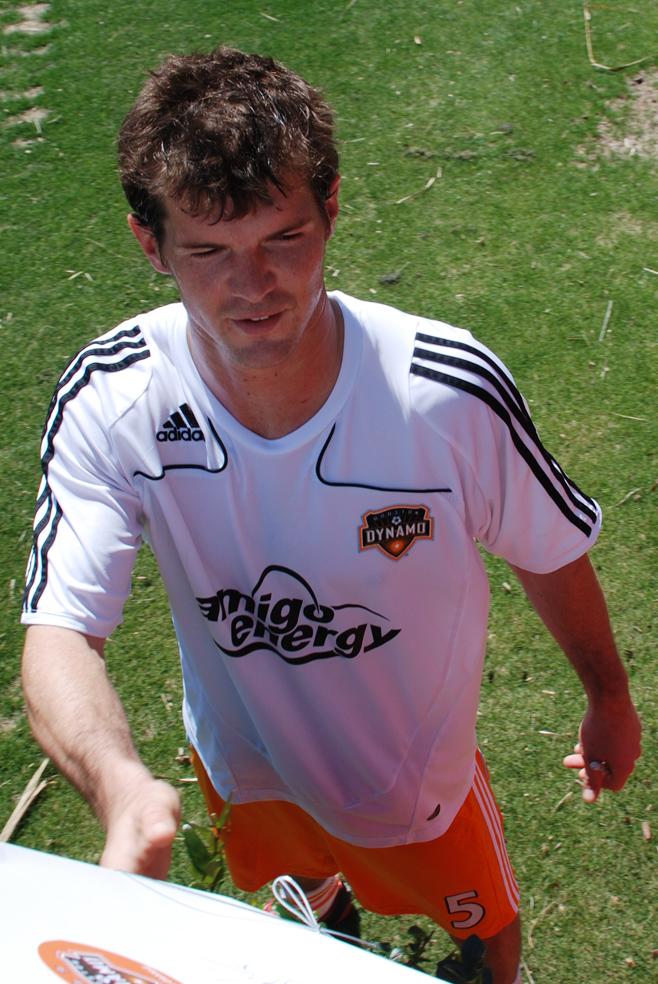
Kyle Brown led the Aztex in assists in the team's first season.

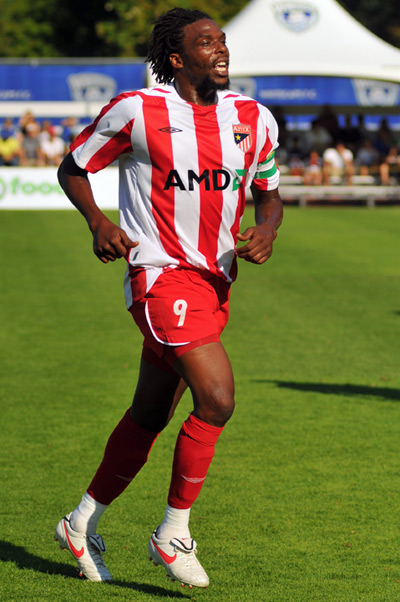
Englishman Gifton Noel-Williams previously played for English club Stoke City, with which the Aztex shared an affiliation agreement.

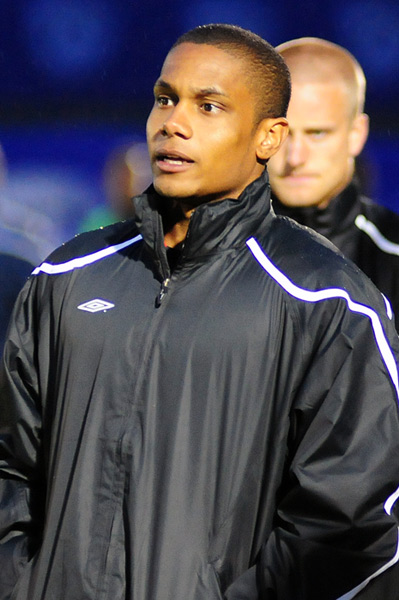
Randi Patterson represented the national soccer team of Trinidad and Tobago.

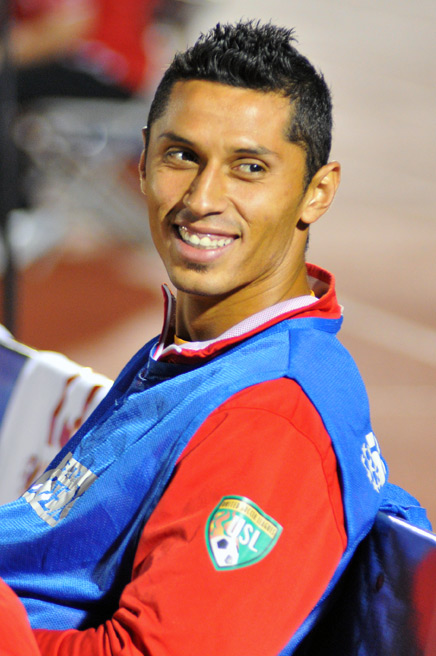
Miguel Gallardo played regularly in goal for the Aztex.

Name	Position	Country	Years	Games	Goals	Assists
Lyle Adams	DF	Jamaica	2009	13	3	1
Joshua Alcala	DF	USA	2009	14	1	0
Jean Alexandre	FW	Haiti	2009	9	4	1
Wes Allen	DF	USA	2009–2010	23	0	0
Yordany Alvarez	MF	Cuba	2009–2010	41	5	7
Kieron Bernard	DF	Jamaica	2009–2010	37	1	0
Sam Brill	DF	USA	2010	6	0	0
Kyle Brown	MF	USA	2009	25	1	6
Michael Callahan	MF	USA	2009–2010	47	1	2
Stephan Campbell	MF	Trinidad and Tobago	2010	3	0	0
Ryan Caugherty	MF	USA	2009	23	0	0
Mike Chabala	DF	USA	2009	2	0	0
Michael Dello-Russo	MF	USA	2009	7	0	0
Gareth Evans	DF	Wales	2009	23	0	0
Ian Fuller	MF	USA	2010	5	0	0
Miguel Gallardo	GK	Mexico	2009–2010	45	0	0
A. J. Godbolt	MF	USA	2009	17	0	0
Leonard Griffin	DF	USA	2010	29	2	5
Maxwell Griffin	FW	USA	2010	31	11	5
Jeff Harwell	MF	USA	2009	15	2	1
Tyler Hemming	MF	Canada	2010	9	0	0
Kyle Helton	DF	USA	2009	4	0	0
Jarius Holmes	FW	USA	2009	14	1	0
David Horst	DF	USA	2009	10	0	0
Mechack Jerome	DF	Haiti	2010	3	0	0
Eddie Johnson	FW	England	2009–2010	50	20	8
Sean Kelley	GK	USA	2010	1	0	0
Peri Marosevic	FW	USA	2010	3	0	0
Yohance Marshall	DF	Trinidad and Tobago	2009–2010	26	3	0
Kendell McFayden	FW	USA	2010	4	1	0
Ryan McMahen	MF	USA	2009	30	1	1
Ryan Mirsky	MF	USA	2009	3	0	0
Jay Needham	DF	USA	2010	27	2	2
Nick Noble	GK	USA	2009	5	0	0
Gifton Noel-Williams	FW	England	2009	16	3	1
Ciaran O'Brien	MF	USA	2009	3	0	0
Lawrence Olum	MF	Kenya	2010	23	3	5
Randi Patterson	FW	Trinidad and Tobago	2010	12	2	1
Zach Pope	DF	USA	2009	7	0	1
Sam Reynolds	GK	USA	2009	12	0	0
Kevin Sakuda	DF	USA	2009–2010	41	0	1
David Sias	DF	USA	2009	15	0	0
Sullivan Silva	MF	Brazil	2009–2010	39	4	2
Alex Tapp	MF	England	2009	5	0	0
Erik Ustruck	MF	USA	2009	5	0	0
Jamie Watson	FW	USA	2009–2010	35	8	8
Lance Watson	MF	USA	2010	26	2	3
Joey Worthen	MF	USA	2010	15	0	1
Tsuyoshi Yoshitake	MF	Japan	2010	7	0	0

== By nationality ==
Seventeen players from outside the United States played in the USL for the Aztex.

Country	Number of players
Brazil	1
Canada	1
Cuba	1
England	3
Haiti	2
Jamaica	2
Japan	1
Kenya	1
Mexico	1
Trinidad and Tobago	3
USA	32
Wales	1
