= 2010 Austin Aztex season =

The Austin Aztex began their second season as a professional team by playing 4 preseason exhibition matches. The first two games were held as a home-home series against Major League Soccer's Houston Dynamo. They also played away games against the Laredo Heat and FC Dallas. Their lone home preseason game against Houston was their final match at Nelson Field. The Aztex now play their home matches at House Park a stadium located in downtown Austin.

On April 28, Austin hosted the Haitian national team. The match was part of a charity series of matches for the Haitians who played FC Dallas and Trinity University in San Antonio earlier in the month. The 4,132 fans who attended the Austin match donated $11,500 to help with the Haiti earthquake recovery effort. In total the series of matches raised over $22,000. The Austin match ended in a 0–0 tie.

On May 19, Austin played the Tampa Bay Rowdies in front of 6,051 fans, their largest home crowd in franchise history.

On August 24, Austin defeated the Carolina Railhawks 3–2. This victory gave the club their first playoff berth in team history.

== Players ==
=== Roster ===
as of June 16, 2010

Note: Flags indicate national team as defined under FIFA eligibility rules; some limited exceptions apply. Players may hold more than one non-FIFA nationality.

No.	Pos.	Nation	Player
1	GK	(Mexico) MEX	Miguel Gallardo
3	DF	(United States) USA	Wes Allen
5	DF	(Jamaica) JAM	Kieron Bernard
6	DF	(United States) USA	Lance Watson
7	MF	(Brazil) BRA	Sullivan Silva
8	MF	(England) ENG	Eddie Johnson
10	MF	(Cuba) CUB	Yordany Alvarez
11	FW	(United States) USA	Maxwell Griffin
12	DF	(United States) USA	Leonard Griffin
13	MF	(Kenya) KEN	Lawrence Olum
15	DF	(United States) USA	Kevin Sakuda

No.	Pos.	Nation	Player
16	MF	(United States) USA	Michael Callahan
18	DF	(United States) USA	Joey Worthen
19	DF	(Trinidad and Tobago) TRI	Yohance Marshall (on loan from LA Galaxy)
21	GK	(United States) USA	Sean Kelley
23	FW	(United States) USA	Kendal McFayden
25	DF	(United States) USA	Sam Brill
26	MF	(Colombia) COL	Ronald Caicedo
33	DF	(United States) USA	Jay Needham
61	MF	(Trinidad and Tobago) TRI	Stephan Campbell
77	FW	(United States) USA	Jamie Watson
—	FW	(United States) USA	Perica Marošević (on loan from FC Dallas)

=== Staff ===
- (England) Adrian Heath – Head Coach
- (United States) Bobby Murphy – Assistant Coach
- (United States) David Winner – Goalkeeping Coach

== Schedule and results ==
=== Exhibition matches ===
Date	Home team	Away team	Score	PK
3–07–10	Houston Dynamo	Austin Aztex	1–1	
3–14–10	Austin Aztex	Houston Dynamo	0–1	
3–26–10	Laredo Heat	Austin Aztex	1–2	
3–31–10	FC Dallas	Austin Aztex	4–1	
4–28–10	Austin Aztex	Haiti	0–0	

=== 2010 U.S. Open Cup ===
Date	Home team	Away team	Score	PKs
06–15–10	Austin	Dallas-Fort Worth Tornados	3–0	–
06–22–10	Austin	Arizona Sahuaros	3–1	–
06–29–10	Chivas USA	Austin	1–0	–

=== Regular season ===
USL Conference
Pos	Team	Pld	W	L	T	GF	GA	GD	Pts	Qualification
1	Rochester Rhinos	30	16	8	6	38	24	+14	54	Conference leader, qualified for playoffs
2	Austin Aztex	30	15	7	8	53	40	+13	53	Qualified for playoffs (Note: The remaining six teams with the highest point totals, regardless of conference, also advance to the playoffs.)
3	Portland Timbers	30	13	7	10	34	23	+11	49	Qualified for playoffs
4	NSC Minnesota Stars	30	11	12	7	32	36	−4	40	Qualified for playoffs
5	Puerto Rico Islanders	30	9	11	10	37	35	+2	37	Qualified for playoffs
6	FC Tampa Bay	30	7	12	11	41	46	−5	32	

Source: USSF D-2 schedule table
Notes:

Date	Home team	Away team	Score	Attendance	Goals
4–11–10	Austin Aztex	Montreal Impact	2–0	2,642	Olum 18', J Watson 77'
4–17–10	AC St. Louis	Austin Aztex	1–2	5,695	Johnson 41', O'Garro 43', L Griffin 57'
4–25–10	Austin Aztex	Rochester Rhinos	1–2	2,819	Hoxie 10' , L Griffin 19', Hamilton 65'
5–01–10	NSC Minnesota Stars	Austin Aztex	1–2	753	Cvilikas 36' , Johnson 75', J Watson 83'
5–08–10	FC Tampa Bay	Austin Aztex	2–2	8,082	King 10' , Johnson 28', J Watson 60', Christie 83'
5–16–10	Austin Aztex	Crystal Palace Baltimore	2–1	3,569	L Watson 36', Mbuta 63' , J Watson 70'
5–19–10	Austin Aztex	FC Tampa Bay	3–3	6,051	Marshall 28', Wheeler 35' , Johnson 45', Donho 45' , Johnson 53', Kljestan 88'
5–26–10	Miami FC Blues	Austin Aztex	1–3	1,014	Alvarez 10', Veris 27' (own goal), Paulo Jr. 39' , Johnson 40'
5–29–10	Crystal Palace Baltimore	Austin Aztex	0–2	1,231	J Watson 65', M Griffin 72'
6–05–10	Austin Aztex	Puerto Rico Islanders	2–1	4,218	M Griffin 24', N Addlery 35', Alvarez 80'
6–09–10	Austin Aztex	Portland Timbers	0–0	3,241	
6–12–10	Austin Aztex	Vancouver Whitecaps FC	1–2	2,841	Olum 45', Haber 68' , Khalfan 81'
6–19–10	Austin Aztex	Miami FC Blues	3–1	2,143	M Griffin 23', Araujo 25' , M Griffin 65', M Griffin 87',
6–26–10	Miami FC Blues	Austin Aztex	1–2	1,148	Johnson 44', Paulo Jr. 86', Johnson 88'
7–03–10	Austin Aztex	Puerto Rico Islanders	1–1	4,050	Martínez 1' (own goal), Daniel 75'
7–09–10	Rochester Rhinos	Austin Aztex	0–0	4,544	
7–17–10	Austin Aztex	AC St. Louis	2–0	3,702	J Watson 35', M Griffin 68'
7–31–10	Austin Aztex	Miami FC Blues	3–1	3,228	Johnson 44', Olum 47', Thompson 75', McFayden 90'
8–07–10	Austin Aztex	FC Tampa Bay	4–2	3,672	Needham 16', L Watson 18', Sanchez 21' , Tan 25' , Needham 35', M Griffin 45'
8–14–10	Puerto Rico Islanders	Austin Aztex	2–0	2,095	Foley 32' , Keon 68'
8–22–10	Austin Aztex	Carolina Railhawks	3–2	4,188	Paladini 18' , Johnson 32', Marchall 66', Patterson 81', Russell 83'
8–26–10	Portland Timbers	Austin Aztex	1–1	14,985	Dike 4' , Silva 26'
8–29–10	Vancouver Whitecaps FC	Austin Aztex	2–2	5,288	Stewart 32' , Marshall 44', Mobulu 52' , Johnson 80'
9–04–10	Austin Aztex	NSC Minnesota Stars	2–0	3,744	Johnson 24', 80'
9–11–10	Puerto Rico Islanders	Austin Aztex	3–1	2,864	J Watson 18', Delgado 61' , Jagdeosingh 70' , Faña 87'
9–16–10	FC Tampa Bay	Austin Aztex	1–1	1,698	M Griffin 50', King 90+'
9–18–10	AC St. Louis	Austin Aztex	2–1	2,620	Stisser 61' , Johnson 90+', Kreamalmeyer 90+'
9–25–10	Austin Aztex	AC St. Louis	4–2	5,800	Callahan 14', Bernard 30', Gauchinho 35' , Kreamalmeyer 40' , M Griffin 50', Patterson 90+'
10–01–10	Carolina Railhawks	Austin Aztex	3–1	2,728	Bernard 44' (own goal), M Griffin 45', Barbara 84' , Heinemann 90'
10–03–10	Montreal Impact	Austin Aztex	0–2	12,608	Le Gall 26' , Placentino 87'

Road attendance numbers are italicized. Non-Austin goals are italicized.

=== Playoffs ===
By beating the Carolina Railhawks on August 24, the Aztex clinched a playoff spot for the first time in the team history. Although Austin ended the regular season with the second best record in the US second division, they were seeded third overall. They opened up their quarterfinal series on the road against the Montreal Impact on October 6, where they lost 2–0 in rainy conditions. The Aztex return to Austin for the second leg of the series on October 9, and lost 2–3. This gave Montreal the win in the series with an aggregate score of 5–2.

Each round is a two-game aggregate goal series. Home teams for the first game of each series listed at the bottom of the bracket.

Quarterfinals
1	Rochester Rhinos	0	2	2
8	Puerto Rico Islanders	2	1	3
4	Portland Timbers	0	1	1
5	Vancouver Whitecaps	2	0	2
3	Austin Aztex	0	2	2
6	Montreal Impact	2	3	5
2	Carolina RailHawks	0	4	4
7	NSC Minnesota Stars	0	0	0

Semifinals
5	Vancouver Whitecaps	0	0	0
8	Puerto Rico Islanders (a.e.t.)	0	2	2
2	Carolina RailHawks	0	2	2
6	Montreal Impact	1	0	1

Final
2	Carolina RailHawks	0	1	1
8	Puerto Rico Islanders	2	1	3

Date	Home team	Away team	Score	Attendance	Goals
First round					
10–06–10	Montreal Impact	Austin Aztex	2–0	7,962	Gerba 39' , Gerba 76'
10–09–10	Austin Aztex	Montreal Impact	2–3	2,872	Gerba 4' , M Griffin 43', Gerba 49' , Johnson 57', Sebrango 89'

Road attendance numbers are italicized. Non-Austin goals are italicized.

== Stats ==
Full Season

Field Players

No	Player	GP	Min	G	A	S	F

Goalkeepers

No	Player	GP	GAA	Min	GA	W	L	T	CS	Saves

GP – games played, Min – Minutes played, G – Goals scored, A – Assists, S – Shots, F – Fouls
GAA – Goals Against Average, GA – Goals Against, W – Wins, L – Losses, T – Ties, CS – Clean Sheets
