= 2011 Orlando City SC season =

Orlando City
2011 season
- Owners: Brendan Flood; Phil Rawlins
- Head coach: Adrian Heath
- Stadium: Citrus Bowl
- USL Pro: Commissioner's Cup; USL Pro Championship
- Playoffs: Champions
- U.S. Open Cup: 3rd round
- WDW Pro Soccer Classic: 3rd
- Top goalscorer: League: Griffin (11); All: Griffin (12)
- Highest home attendance: 11,220 vs Harrisburg City Islanders September 3, 2011
- Lowest home attendance: 1,321 vs Charleston Battery August 3, 2011
- Average home league attendance: 6,021 (including playoffs)
Home colors	Away colors

The 2011 Orlando City SC season, marked the club's first season in existence, and their first year in the third-tier USL Pro League. Previously, the club was known as the Austin Aztex FC before they were relocated to Orlando, Florida. They won a double, winning the Commissioner's Cup as the top team in the league's regular season, and winning the USL Pro Championship.

== Match results ==
Win Tie Loss

=== Friendlies ===
Orlando City's 2011 pre-season started with three games against Major League Soccer ("MLS") clubs. It won its first match, a 1–0 result against Philadelphia Union at the Citrus Bowl, with then-trainee Lewis Neal scoring the team's first goal. It also played a 4-team classic at the ESPN Wide World of Sports Complex, drawing FC Dallas for its first match on February 24, a 0–1 loss. On February 26 they won again, this time against Toronto FC, a result of 1–0. This marked the club's second victory. Orlando City got the opportunity to play Swedish First Division side BK Häcken in a friendly at the ESPN Wide World of Sports Complex on March 5. City played a hard-fought game, as the game ended in a 2–3 loss.

After playing the MLS teams, Orlando City then played a series of games against Florida college teams. They played Division II runner-up Rollins College Tars on March 16 at the Cahall-Sandspur Field and Barker Family Stadium in Winter Park resulting in a 3–1 victory. They followed this game with a 5–1 victory over Division I University of Central Florida Knights at the UCF Track and Soccer Complex in Orlando. Orlando City played on March 22 against Division I Stetson University Hatters in DeLand, FL, and the final pre-season game was on March 26 against Division I University of South Florida Bulls at the USF Soccer Stadium in Tampa.

Orlando City scheduled mid-season friendlies with two clubs from the Premier League, Bolton Wanderers and Newcastle United.

February 19, 2011 1	Orlando City SC	1–0	Philadelphia Union	Orlando, Florida
7:35 pm EST	Neal 19'			Stadium: Citrus Bowl; Attendance: 3,600

February 24, 2011 2	Orlando City SC	0–1	FC Dallas	Kissimmee, Florida
6:00 pm EST				Stadium: ESPN Wide World of Sports Complex

February 26, 2011 3	Orlando City SC	1–0	Toronto FC	Kissimmee, Florida
6:00 pm EST	Fuller 76'			Stadium: ESPN Wide World of Sports Complex

March 5, 2011 4	Orlando City SC	2–3	Häcken	Kissimmee, Florida
7:30 pm EST	Jorsling 17'; Neal 75'			Stadium: ESPN Wide World of Sports Complex

March 16, 2011 5	Rollins Tars	1–3	Orlando City SC	Winter Park, Florida
7:30 pm EDT	Wright 56'		Griffin 37'; Neal 83'; Jorsling 85'	Stadium: Cahall-Sandspur Field, Rollins College

March 20, 2011 6	UCF Knights	1–5	Orlando City SC	Orlando, Florida
2:00 pm EDT	? 30'		Griffin 5' 73' 75'; Jorsling 70' (pen.); Neal 80'	Stadium: UCF Track and Soccer Complex

March 23, 2011 7	Stetson Hatters	3–5	Orlando City SC	DeLand, Florida
7:30 pm EDT	? 23' ? 38' ? 69' (pen.)		Fuller 8'; Jorsling 21'; Álvarez 36'; Griffin 61'; Watson 72'	Stadium: Stetson University

March 26, 2011 8	USF Bulls	0–2	Orlando City SC	Tampa, Florida
7:30 pm EDT			Álvarez 30'; Watson 60'	Stadium: USF Soccer Stadium

May 3, 2011 9	Orlando City SC	1–0	Central Florida Kraze	Closed scrimmage
	Jorsling (P1)

July 17, 2011 10	Orlando City SC	1–3	Bolton Wanderers	Orlando, Florida
7:35 pm EDT	Luzunaris 28'		Davies 18'; Pratley 36'; Petrov 39'	Stadium: Citrus Bowl; Attendance: 6,932

July 23, 2011 11	Orlando City SC	1–0	Newcastle United	Orlando, Florida
7:35 pm EDT	Molino 76'			Stadium: Citrus Bowl; Attendance: 10,889

=== USL Pro ===
Following a season-opening road loss to Richmond Kickers, Orlando City went on an 11-match undefeated run, closing the first half with a record of 8–1–3. Goalkeeper Miguel Gallardo had a league-high eleven clean sheets. The Lions finished with a 15–3–6 record, winning the 2011 Commissioner's Cup and home-field advantage throughout the USL Pro Playoffs.

April 2, 2011 1	Richmond Kickers	2–0	Orlando City SC	Richmond, Virginia
4:00 pm EDT	Nyazamba 39' (pen.); Delicâte 84'			Stadium: Legion Stadium; Attendance: 1,650; Referee: Mark Gorak

April 9, 2011 2	Orlando City SC	3–0	F.C. New York	Orlando, Florida
7:35 pm EDT	Griffin 43' 71'; Álvarez 54'			Stadium: Citrus Bowl; Attendance: 7,933; Referee: Fernando Iturrialga

April 16, 2011 3	Charlotte Eagles	0–1	Orlando City SC	Charlotte, North Carolina
7:00 pm EDT			Valentino 30'	Stadium: Charlotte Christian School Stadium; Attendance: 854; Referee: Justus Agbeko

April 22, 2011 4	Orlando City SC	2–2	Puerto Rico United	Orlando, Florida
7:35 pm EDT	Griffin 47' 49'		Silva 30'; Turizo 72'	Stadium: Citrus Bowl; Attendance: 7,279; Referee: Robert Joyner

April 30, 2011 5	F.C. New York	1–2	Orlando City SC	Queens, New York City
7:30 pm EDT	Morrison 54'		Olum 13'; Neal 81'	Stadium: Belson Stadium; Attendance: 2,600; Referee: Herman Aguilar

May 7, 2011 6	Dayton Dutch Lions	0–1	Orlando City SC	Dayton, Ohio
7:30 pm EDT			Griffin 28'	Stadium: Miami Valley South Stadium; Referee: Brandon Rinkenberger

May 14, 2011 7	Orlando City SC	1–0	Pittsburgh Riverhounds	Orlando, Florida
7:35 pm EDT	Molino 3'			Stadium: Citrus Bowl; Attendance: 5,876; Referee: Agostino Minasola

May 20, 2011 8	Rochester Rhinos	0–0	Orlando City SC	Rochester, New York
7:30 pm EDT				Stadium: Sahlen's Stadium; Attendance: 4,064; Referee: Daniel Radford

May 22, 2011 9	Harrisburg City Islanders	1–3	Orlando City SC	Harrisburg, Pennsylvania
3:00 pm EDT	Basso 80'		Stewart 2'; Griffin 90'; Neal 90+2' (pen.)	Stadium: Skyline Sports Complex; Attendance: 921; Referee: Bryan Roslund

May 25, 2011 10	Orlando City SC	2–0	Richmond Kickers	Orlando, Florida
7:35 pm EDT	Neal 4'; Molino 13'			Stadium: Citrus Bowl; Attendance: 4,517; Referee: Kian Attai

June 2, 2011 11	Orlando City SC	0–0	Charlotte Eagles	Orlando, Florida
7:35 pm EDT				Stadium: Citrus Bowl; Attendance: 4,241; Referee: Donald Dellavia

June 4, 2011 12	Wilmington Hammerheads	2–4	Orlando City SC	Wilmington, North Carolina
7:30 pm EDT	Cuero 31'; Banks 44'		Watson 41' 52' (pen.); Stewart 64'; Griffin 90'	Stadium: Legion Stadium; Attendance: 3,853; Referee: Jeff Davis

June 10, 2011 13	Orlando City SC	1–2	Antigua Barracuda FC	Orlando, Florida
7:35 pm EDT	Griffin 59'		Smith 48'; Burton 54'	Stadium: Citrus Bowl; Attendance: 5,934; Referee: Rob Mauwa

June 18, 2011 14	Orlando City SC	1–1	Wilmington Hammerheads	Orlando, Florida
7:35 pm EDT	Jorsling 55'		Budnyi 84'	Stadium: Citrus Bowl; Attendance: 6,923; Referee: Andres Pfefferkorn

June 24, 2011 15	Antigua Barracuda FC	1–3	Orlando City SC	Saint George, Antigua, Antigua and Barbuda
9:00 pm ADT	Mitchum 25'		Valentino 17'; Griffin 25'; Boden 61'	Stadium: Sticky Wicket Stadium; Attendance: 1,200; Referee: Curtis Charles

June 26, 2011 16	Antigua Barracuda FC	1–2	Orlando City SC	Saint George, Antigua, Antigua and Barbuda
6:00 pm ADT	Christian 51'		Jorsling 13' 22'	Stadium: Sticky Wicket Stadium; Attendance: 1,200; Referee: Brian Willett

July 1, 2011 17	Pittsburgh Riverhounds	0–0	Orlando City SC	Pittsburgh, Pennsylvania
7:00 pm EDT				Stadium: Chartiers Valley High School; Attendance: 963; Referee: Ron D'Ambrosia

July 3, 2011 18	Rochester Rhinos	0–1	Orlando City SC	Rochester, New York
7:00 pm EDT			Watson 17'	Stadium: Sahlen's Stadium; Attendance: 4,958; Referee: Michael Donovan

July 8, 2001 19	Orlando City SC	0–0	Dayton Dutch Lions	Orlando, Florida
7:35 pm EDT				Stadium: Citrus Bowl; Attendance: 4,594; Referee: Carlos Sandaval

July 9, 2011 20	Charleston Battery	1–0	Orlando City SC	Charleston, South Carolina
7:30 pm EDT	Caskey 62'			Stadium: Blackbaud Stadium; Attendance: 3,321; Referee: Donald Dellavia

July 16, 2011 21	Orlando City SC	2–1	Rochester Rhinos	Orlando, Florida
6:35 pm EDT	Luzunaris 38'; Neal 41'		Donatelli 15'	Stadium: Citrus Bowl; Attendance: 4,758; Referee: Kristen Schiereck

August 3, 2011 22	Orlando City SC	1–0	Charleston Battery	Orlando, Florida
7:35 pm EDT	Watson 16'			Stadium: Citrus Bowl; Attendance: 1,321; Referee: Joshua Thompson

August 6, 2011 23	Orlando City SC	2–1	Charleston Battery	Orlando, Florida
7:35 pm EDT	Watson 65' (pen.); Álvarez 72'		Kelly 84'	Stadium: Citrus Bowl; Attendance: 5,253; Referee: Kristen Schiereck

August 12, 2011 24	Orlando City SC	4–0	Harrisburg City Islanders	Orlando, Florida
7:35 pm EDT	Chin 22'; Watson 55' (pen.) 80' 84'			Stadium: Citrus Bowl; Attendance: 4,549; Referee: Carlos Sandoval

- The Puerto Rico Soccer League teams (Sevilla FC Puerto Rico, River Plate Puerto Rico and Puerto Rico United) withdrew from USL Pro competition on May 9, 2011. Games played before then counted toward standings, but games scheduled thereafter were rescheduled with other teams. This affected two games for Orlando City: a June 24 away date against River Plate (rescheduled to Antigua), and a June 29 home date against Sevilla (rescheduled to August 3 vs Charleston).

=== USL Pro Playoffs ===
August 20, 2011 QF	Orlando City SC	3–1 (a.e.t.)	Charleston Battery	Orlando, Florida
7:30 pm EDT	Griffin 44'; Chin 100'; Neal 118'		Wiltse (yellow card) 34'; Kelley (yellow card) 59'; Paterson 64'; Falvey (yellow card) 102'; Kelley (red card) 102'; Peverley (yellow card) 120'	Stadium: Citrus Bowl; Attendance: 7,604; Referee: Rob Mauws

August 27, 2011 SF	Orlando City SC	3–0	Richmond Kickers	Orlando, Florida
7:30 pm EDT	Boden 19'; Jerome 45+2'; Chin 70'		Wallace (yellow card) 3'; Kalungi (red card) 89'	Stadium: Citrus Bowl; Attendance: 8,304; Referee: Andres Pfefferkorn

September 3, 2011 F	Orlando City SC	2–2 (a.e.t.) (3–2 p)	Harrisburg City Islanders	Orlando, Florida
7:00 pm EDT	Gallardo (red card) 48'; Molino (yellow card) 64'; Olum 89'; Boden (yellow card) 110'; Neal 115' (pen.)		Basso (yellow card) 5'; Pelletier (yellow card) 45+'; Welker (yellow card) 77'; Harrison (yellow card) 90+'; Noone 90+5'; Touray 95'; Langley (yellow card) 111'; Bloes (red card) 113'	Stadium: Citrus Bowl; Attendance: 11,220; Referee: Matt Bazakos
	Penalties
	Neal (penalty scored); Alvarez (penalty scored); Campbell (penalty missed); Boden (penalty missed); Jorsling (penalty scored)		Becerra (penalty missed); Angulo (penalty missed); Noone (penalty scored); Basso (penalty scored); Touray (penalty missed)

=== 2011 U.S. Open Cup ===
Orlando City did not give up a goal in its first 217 minutes of U.S. Open Cup competition in 2011, beating ASC New Stars of the USASA Houston Football Association in the first round, and Charleston Battery of USL Pro in the second round. After taking an early lead in its third round match against FC Dallas, a rematch from the WDW Pro Soccer Classic, Dallas scored twice and looked to cruise to the fourth round. Yordany Álvarez stunned Dallas keeper Kevin Hartman with a late equalizer in second half stoppage time, but a barrage of quick attempts on the restart led to a Milton Rodríguez game-winner right before the end of play to eliminate the Lions from the Open Cup.

June 14, 2011 1	Orlando City SC	4–0	ASC New Stars	Orlando, Florida
7:30 pm EDT	Jorsling 27' 77'; Molino 42'; Chin 60'	Report		Stadium: UCF Soccer and Track Stadium; Attendance: 1,139; Referee: Kian Attai

June 21, 2011 2	Charleston Battery	0–1	Orlando City SC	Charleston, South Carolina
7:00 pm EDT		Report	Valentino 39'	Stadium: Blackbaud Stadium; Attendance: 1,249

June 28, 2011 3	FC Dallas	3–2	Orlando City SC	Frisco, Texas
8:00 pm CDT	Jackson 38'; Villar 50'; Rodríguez 90+'	Report	Griffin 20'; Álvarez 90+'	Stadium: Pizza Hut Park; Attendance: 1,876; Referee: Armando Villarreal

== Club ==
=== Roster ===
Final roster as of August 4, 2011.

Note: Flags indicate national team as defined under FIFA eligibility rules; some limited exceptions apply. Players may hold more than one non-FIFA nationality.

No.	Pos.	Nation	Player
1	GK	MEX	Miguel Gallardo
2	DF	HAI	Mechack Jérôme
3	DF	JAM	Demar Stewart
4	MF	USA	Ian Fuller
5	DF	JAM	Kieron Bernard
6	DF	USA	Jack Traynor
7	MF	TTO	Justin Fojo
8	MF	USA	Erik Ustruck
9	FW	TTO	Devorn Jorsling
10	MF	CUB	Yordany Álvarez
11	FW	USA	Maxwell Griffin

No.	Pos.	Nation	Player
13	MF	KEN	Lawrence Olum
14	MF	ENG	Luke Boden
15	FW	USA	Dennis Chin
16	DF	USA	Wes Allen
18	MF	TTO	Kevin Molino
21	GK	USA	Sean Kelley
22	DF	USA	Rob Valentino
23	MF	USA	Charlie Campbell
24	MF	ENG	Lewis Neal
77	FW	USA	Jamie Watson

=== Squad information ===
No.	Nat.	Player	Birthday	Previous club	Pro USL† appearances	Pro USL† goals
Goalkeepers
1	(Mexico)	Miguel Gallardo	October 24, 1984 (age 42)	(United States) Austin Lightning*	63	0
21	(United States)	Sean Kelley	April 18, 1988 (age 38)	(United States) Northern Virginia Royals*	2	0
Defenders
2	(Haiti)	Mechack Jérôme	April 21, 1990 (age 36)	(Portugal) S.C. Mirandela*	9	0
3	(Jamaica)	Demar Stewart	December 15, 1984 (age 41)	(England) Sheffield United F.C.	11	2
5	(Jamaica)	Kieron Bernard	August 2, 1985 (age 41)	(United States) Austin Aztex U23*	41	1
6	(United States)	Jack Traynor	March 17, 1987 (age 39)	(United States) AC St. Louis	34	0
16	(United States)	Wes Allen	September 17, 1986 (age 40)	(United States) Austin Aztex U23*	23	0
22	(United States)	Rob Valentino	December 21, 1985 (age 40)	(United States) FC Tampa Bay	43	1
Midfielders
4	(United States)	Ian Fuller	August 31, 1979 (age 47)	(United States) Charleston Battery*	142	15
7	(Trinidad and Tobago) (United States)	Justin Fojo	December 7, 1988 (age 37)	(United States) College of Charleston	2	0
8	(United States)	Erik Ustruck	January 4, 1985 (age 41)	(United States) FC Tampa Bay	21	0
10	(Cuba)	Yordany Álvarez	May 24, 1985 (age 41)	(Cuba) FC Cienfuegos*	53	6
13	(Kenya)	Lawrence Olum	July 10, 1984 (age 42)	(United States) Minnesota Thunder*	106	14
14	(England)	Luke Boden	November 26, 1988 (age 37)	(England) Sheffield Wednesday F.C.	14	2
18	(Trinidad and Tobago)	Kevin Molino	June 17, 1990 (age 36)	(Trinidad and Tobago) Ma Pau SC	11	2
23	(United States)	Charlie Campbell	January 5, 1988 (age 38)	(United States) Louisville Cardinals	5	0
24	(England)	Lewis Neal	July 14, 1981 (age 45)	(England) Shrewsbury Town F.C.	13	6
Strikers
9	(Trinidad and Tobago)	Devorn Jorsling	December 27, 1983 (age 42)	(Trinidad and Tobago) Defence Force F.C.	13	3
11	(United States)	Maxwell Griffin	September 17, 1987 (age 39)	(United States) Los Angeles Legends*	49	19
15	(United States)	Dennis Chin	June 4, 1987 (age 39)	(United States) Central Florida Kraze	4	3
77	(United States)	Jamie Watson	April 10, 1986 (age 40)	(United States) Wilmington Hammerheads*	60	24

† = "Pro USL" means leagues with professional USL teams, meaning USL First Division and its predecessors (through 2009), USL Second Division (through 2010) and the USSF Division 2 Professional League (2010).

* = Denotes players who were retained after the move of the Austin Aztex FC organization to form Orlando City S.C.

=== Loans ===
Michael Tetteh was loaned to Orlando City on June 29, 2011 on a 10-day contract and returned to Seattle by July 12.

Matt Luzunaris was loaned to Orlando City before July 16, 2011 game against Rochester for an unspecified time period and with San Jose reserving the right to recall. Luzunaris scored goals in his first two games playing for City, against Rochester and English Premier League team Bolton Luzunaris was recalled by San Jose on August 2.

Following the season, Yordany Álvarez was loaned to Real Salt Lake, and Maxwell Griffin was loaned to San Jose Earthquakes. Both loans lasted to the end of the 2011 Major League Soccer season. Since they occurred at the MLS roster deadline, both players were eligible for the MLS playoffs. In addition, Lawrence Olum left on free transfer, as his contract ended, and was signed by Sporting Kansas City.

=== Players on trial ===
List according to roster provided for the 2011 Walt Disney World Pro Soccer Classic.

Note: Flags indicate national team as defined under FIFA eligibility rules; some limited exceptions apply. Players may hold more than one non-FIFA nationality.

No.	Pos.	Nation	Player
19	MF		Phillip Jackson
20	DF	USA	José Burciaga, Jr.
23	MF	USA	Frankie Lopez

=== Personnel ===
==== Coaching staff ====
Position	Staff
General Manager	vacant
Head coach	(England) Adrian Heath
Assistant coach	(United States) Ian Fuller
Goalkeepers Coach	(Brazil) Marcos Machado

Updated to match played February 13, 2011
Source: Orlando City S.C.

==== Management ====
Majority Owner & President	(England) Phil Rawlins
Minority Owners	(England) Brendan Flood (England) Gary Mellor
Director of Operations	(United States) Alex Wolf
Director of Communications	(United States) Adam Soucie
Director of Community Relations	(England) Kay Rawlins
Director of Camps and Clinics	(United States) Brian Pederson
Ground (capacity and dimensions)	Citrus Bowl (70,000 / 104.2x67.7 meters)

Updated to match played February 13, 2011
Source: Orlando City S.C.

== Standings ==
=== American Division ===
Pos	Team	Pld	W	T	L	GF	GA	GD	Pts	Qualification
1	Orlando City SC (C)	24	15	6	3	36	16	+20	51	2011 USL Pro Commissioner's Cup, 2011 USL Pro Playoffs
2	Wilmington Hammerheads (A)	24	14	3	7	42	30	+12	45	2011 USL Pro Playoffs (Note: The top four clubs in each division are guaranteed spots in the 2011 USL Pro Playoffs.)
3	Richmond Kickers (A)	24	12	5	7	35	21	+14	41	2011 USL Pro Playoffs
4	Charleston Battery (A)	24	10	5	9	24	25	−1	35	2011 USL Pro Playoffs
5	Charlotte Eagles	24	9	6	9	32	29	+3	33	
6	Antigua Barracuda	24	9	2	13	32	32	0	29	

Source: USL Pro official standings
Rules for classification: Points, then tiebreak: 1) Head-to-head record based on total points in League games, 2) Total wins in League games, 3) Goal difference in League games, 4) Goals scored in League games, etc.
(A) Advances to USL Pro Playoffs; (C) Commissioner's Cup (best regular season record)
