= 2009 Austin Aztex season =

The 2009 Austin Aztex season was the club's inaugural season in professional soccer. The Aztex played in the USL First Division (USL-1), the second tier of the American Soccer Pyramid.

The team was coached by Adrian Heath and played its home games at Nelson Field in Austin, Texas. The Aztex finished their first season in 10th place out of 11 teams, with a record of 5 wins, 17 losses, and 8 ties. The team was deducted two points during the season for fielding an ineligible player and ultimately failed to qualify for the playoffs.

In the 2009 Lamar Hunt U.S. Open Cup, the Aztex advanced to the Third Round (Round of 16) before being eliminated by Major League Soccer's Houston Dynamo in a 2–0 loss. Eddie Johnson was the team's top goalscorer with 5 goals, while Kyle Brown led the team with 6 assists.

== Schedule and results ==
Exhibition Matches
The Austin Aztex began their inaugural season as a professional team by playing 4 MLS teams in preseason exhibition matches. The first three games were held in Austin at Nelson Field while the fourth MLS match was in Rio Tinto Stadium on the MLS opening weekend. A fifth exhibition match was scheduled against the CONCACAF semi-finalist Puerto Rico Islanders in between their home and away series against Cruz Azul.

Date	Home Team	Away Team	Score	*PK
2–28–09	Austin Aztex	New England Revolution	0 - 1	
3–07–09	Austin Aztex	Houston Dynamo	2 - 2	
3–14–09	Austin Aztex	Columbus Crew	1 - 0	
3–21–09	Real Salt Lake	Austin Aztex	3 - 1	
4–03–09	Austin Aztex	Puerto Rico Islanders	0 - 0*	3 - 0

2009 U.S. Open Cup

Date	Home Team	Away Team	Score	PKs
6–09–09	Austin Aztex	Mississippi Brilla	2–0	
6–16–09	Austin Aztex	El Paso Patriots	2–0	
7–01–09	Austin Aztex	Houston Dynamo	0–2	

Regular Season Matches

Date	Home Team	Away Team	Score	Attendance
4–18–09	Austin Aztex	Minnesota Thunder	1-1	4,891
4–21–09	Austin Aztex	Vancouver Whitecaps FC	1-1	1,549
4–25–09	Austin Aztex	Cleveland City Stars	3–0	3,248
5–08–09	Austin Aztex	Puerto Rico Islanders	1-1	5,216
5–17–09	Montreal Impact	Austin Aztex	4–0	11,470
5–24–09	Austin Aztex	Carolina Railhawks	0–1	2,388
5–29–09	Austin Aztex	Puerto Rico Islanders	3–1	2,019
6–05–09	Austin Aztex	Charleston Battery	0–2	2,246
6–07–09	Austin Aztex	Charleston Battery	1-1	2,891
6–12–09	Puerto Rico Islanders	Austin Aztex	4–1	4,014
6–14–09	Miami FC Blues	Austin Aztex	2–0	805
6–19–09	Austin Aztex	Carolina Railhawks	1-1	2,629
6–21–09	Austin Aztex	Rochester Rhinos	0–2	3,114
6–27–09	Cleveland City Stars	Austin Aztex	2-2	1,517
7–03–09	Cleveland City Stars	Austin Aztex	0–1	1,837
7–05–09	Rochester Rhinos	Austin Aztex	4–1	6,892
7–11–09	Austin Aztex	Portland Timbers	1–2	3,114
7–18–09	Minnesota Thunder	Austin Aztex	1–0	3,972
7–25–09	Austin Aztex	Montreal Impact	2-2	2,786
7–30–09	Charleston Battery	Austin Aztex	1–0	2,476
8–01–09	Carolina Railhawks	Austin Aztex	3–0	2,138
8–08–09	Rochester Rhinos	Austin Aztex	1–0	4,752
8–16–09	Austin Aztex	Minnesota Thunder	2-2	3,470
8–23–09	Montreal Impact	Austin Aztex	2–0	13,034
8–29–09	Austin Aztex	Miami FC Blues	1–0	2,611
9–02–09	Vancouver Whitecaps FC	Austin Aztex	3–2	5,081
9–05–09	Miami FC Blues	Austin Aztex	3–1	
9–07–09	Austin Aztex	Portland Timbers	0–1	2,439
9–11–09	Portland Timbers	Austin Aztex	2–1	10,141
9–13–09	Vancouver Whitecaps FC	Austin Aztex	1–2	5,288

Road attendance numbers are italicized

== Stats ==
Full Season

Field Players

No	Player	GP	Min	G	A	S	F
3	Lyle Adams	13	1051	3	1	3	11
12	Joshua Alcala	14	1004	1	0	1	4
25	Jean Alexandre	9	781	4	1	16	17
21	Wes Allen	11	396	0	0	1	3
10	Yordany Alvarez	14	1229	3	2	9	6
5	Kieron Bernard	21	1801	0	0	8	29
11	Kyle Brown	25	1710	1	6	28	20
16	Michael Callahan	24	1652	0	2	11	36
17	Ryan Caugherty	23	1153	0	0	8	25
28	Michael Chabala	2	180	0	0	4	2
22	Michael Dello-Russo	7	630	0	0	3	10
4	Gareth Evans	23	1674	0	0	8	14
14	A. J. Godbolt	17	970	0	0	7	15
24	Jeff Harwell	15	803	2	1	8	11
23	Kyle Helton	4	82	0	0	1	1
15	Jarius Holmes	14	548	1	0	7	2
29	David Horst	10	900	0	0	5	10
8	Eddie Johnson	22	1873	5	4	54	12
22	Yohance Marshall	2	180	0	0	0	1
20	Ryan McMahen	30	2115	1	1	14	28
26	Ryan Mirsky	3	147	0	0	0	2
9	Gifton Noel-Williams	16	1024	3	1	18	13
26	Ciaran O'Brien	3	150	0	0	0	1
2	Zach Pope	7	257	0	1	0	4
28	Kevin Sakuda	13	1113	0	1	3	6
6	David Sias	15	957	0	0	4	8
7	Sullivan Silva	24	1654	3	2	44	13
19	Alex Tapp	5	116	0	0	2	3
27	Erik Ustruck	5	449	0	0	2	7
77	Jamie Watson	6	257	1	0	5	7
	Total			27	23	274	321

Goalkeepers

No	Player	GP	GAA	Min	GA	W	L	T	CS	Saves
1	Miguel Gallardo	14	1.555	1215	21	3	7	4	1	65
31	Nicholas Noble	5	1.600	450	8	1	3	1	1	20
18	Sam Reynolds	12	1.913	1035	22	1	6	4	1	46

GP - games played, Min - Minutes played, G - Goals scored, A - Assists, S - Shots, F - Fouls
GAA - Goals Against Average, GA - Goals Against, W - Wins, L - Losses, T - Ties, CS - Clean Sheets
