= Ryan Mirsky =

American soccer player (born 1986)

Personal information
- Full name: Ryan Joseph Mirsky
- Date of birth: November 21, 1986 (age 39)
- Place of birth: Tyler, Texas, United States
- Height: 6 ft 1 in (1.85 m)
- Position: Midfielder

Youth career
- 2005–2008: SMU Mustangs

Senior career*
Years	Team	Apps	(Gls)
2006–2008	DFW Tornados	24	(2)
2009	Austin Aztex U23	11	(1)
2009	Austin Aztex	3	(0)
- * Club domestic league appearances and goals as of 22 October 2009

Ryan Mirsky (born November 21, 1986, in Tyler, Texas) is an American soccer player who as of 2010 was without a club.

== Career ==
=== Youth and amateur ===
Mirsky attended Tyler Robert E. Lee High School, and played college soccer at Southern Methodist University, where he was selected to the Conference USA All-Freshman team in 2005, and the All-Conference USA third-team as a junior.

During his college years Mirsky also played with DFW Tornados in the USL Premier Development League.

=== Professional ===
Despite being invited to the 2008 MLS Combine, Mirsky was not drafted, and having been unable to secure a professional contract elsewhere, signed with Austin Aztex U23 of the USL Premier Development League for the 2009 season. After making 11 appearances for the U23 team, Mirsky was promoted up to the Austin Aztex senior team in September 2009.
