= St. Louis Lions =

- Full name: St. Louis Lions Soccer Club
- Nickname: The Lions
- Founded: 2006; 20 years ago
- Dissolved: March 12, 2023; 3 years ago
- Stadium: Tony Glavin Soccer Park; Cottleville, Missouri
- Capacity: 500
- Owner: Tony Glavin
- Head Coach: Tony Glavin
- League: USL League Two
- 2022: 4th, Heartland Division; Playoffs: DNQ
- Website: http://www.stllions.com
Home colors	Away colors	Third colors

St. Louis Lions was an American soccer team based in St. Louis, Missouri, United States. Founded in 2006, the team played in USL League Two, the fourth tier of the American Soccer Pyramid.

The team played its home games at the Tony Glavin Soccer Complex in Cottleville, Missouri, since 2006. The team's colors were green and white.

In 2011 the Lions became a partner with Celtic Football Club, which sent coaches from its Youth Academy to help Lions’ players and coaches. Some Lions players and coaches traveled to Glasgow to observe and take part in the Academy.

== History ==
The St. Louis Lions entered the PDL in 2006 under the leadership of Scottish-born former professional Tony Glavin, who played for Queen's Park in Scotland in the 1980s and for the old St. Louis Steamers in the Major Indoor Soccer League. The first couple of games were difficult for the Lions, as they struggled to find their feet in the PDL. They lost their opening fixture 2–0 to Des Moines Menace, and despite a come-from-behind 3–2 win over Sioux Falls Spitfire, finished their first month in competition with just four points on the board. However, the 0–0 tie with Colorado Springs Blizzard on May 28 initiated an astonishing 12-game unbeaten streak which stretched to the end of the season. The Lions were rampant, tallying several impressive victories (3–0 over West Michigan Edge, 5–1 over Cleveland Internationals), and keeping their home at the Tony Glavin Complex a fortress. Despite this, the Lions just failed to make the playoffs, beaten into fourth place in the Heartland Division by their strong opponents -but nevertheless, 7 wins and 27 points in their debut season was a promising beginning for the franchise. Strikers Lawrence Olum and Tommy Heinemann were the top scorers with 17 goals between them.

The 2007 season was better still for the Lions, as they made the playoffs for the first time, at the second attempt. The Lions were certainly one of the more entertaining teams in the division, going through the entire season without a single tie: wins included several high-scoring encounters with Springfield Demize, an impressive 4–1 road victory over Thunder Bay Chill that featured a hat trick from Tommy Heinemann, a see-sawing 4–3 win over Indiana Invaders at the beginning of July, and a devastating 8–0 demolition of Springfield which saw them secure their playoff spot before the final weekend. The Lions finished the year second in the Heartland behind Thunder Bay, but their trip to the post-season was a short one, as they were comprehensively beaten 4–1 by Great Lakes champions Michigan Bucks. Tommy Heinemann was again the Lions' top scorer with 14 goals, while Jarius Holmes tallied 7 assists.

Having enjoyed a successful sophomore season, the Lions were looking for more success in 2008, and started the year well: they began their campaign with a 6-game unbeaten run that included an impressive opening day victory on the road at regional powerhouse Des Moines Menace. Their string early season form also took the Lions to the US Open Cup for the first time, where they faced USL1 franchise Minnesota Thunder, who eventually ran out 4–1 winners. Unfortunately, the month of June saw the Lions play Thunder Bay Chill four times in nine days – twice at home, twice in Ontario – and lose each game, scoring four goals but conceding 11 to the eventual national champions. These games seemed to affect St. Louis' confidence, and they struggled through their last six games: the hopeless Springfield Demize made them score two late goals to secure an uncharacteristically difficult 3–2 win (although they did beat their Missouri rivals 4–0 next time out), and they traded a barrage of goals with Colorado Rapids U23's only to eventually run out on the wrong end of a 5–4 scoreline. The Lions' playoff push was floundering by the last day of the season, and although they beat Kansas City Brass 3–2 on the final game, other results did not go their way, and they ended the year in fourth, two points off the post-season slot. The prolific Tommy Heinemann was the Lions' top scorer for the third straight year with 13 goals, while Jarius Holmes again tallied 7 assists.

On December 17, 2008, Lions owner Tony Glavin announced his intention for the team to turn professional and join the USL First Division for the 2010 season, but these plans were shelved following the dispute between USL team owners and the subsequent formation of the new North American Soccer League.

On March 29, 2022, Tony Glavin announced that the Lions and their TG Lions Academy would merge with St. Charles FC and transfer their League Two rights to them, starting with the 2023 season.

== Year-by-year ==
=== Men's Team ===
Year	Division	League	Regular season	Playoffs	Open Cup
2006	4	USL PDL	4th, Heartland	did not qualify	did not qualify
2007	4	USL PDL	2nd, Heartland	Conference Semifinals	did not qualify
2008	4	USL PDL	4th, Heartland	did not qualify	1st Round
2009	4	USL PDL	4th, Heartland	did not qualify	1st Round
2010	4	USL PDL	5th, Heartland	did not qualify	did not qualify
2011	4	USL PDL	5th, Heartland	did not qualify	did not qualify
2012	4	USL PDL	7th, Heartland	did not qualify	did not qualify
2013	4	USL PDL	5th, Heartland	did not qualify	did not qualify
2014	4	USL PDL	2nd, Heartland	Conference Semifinals	did not qualify
2015	4	USL PDL	5th, Heartland	did not qualify	did not qualify
2016	4	USL PDL	5th, Heartland	did not qualify	did not qualify
2017	4	USL PDL	4th, Heartland	did not qualify	did not qualify
2018	4	USL PDL	4th, Heartland	did not qualify	did not qualify
2019	4	USL League Two	5th, Heartland	did not qualify	did not qualify
2020	4	USL League Two	Season cancelled due to COVID-19 pandemic		
2021	4	USL League Two	did not play due to COVID-19 pandemic		
2022	4	USL League Two	4th, Heartland	did not qualify	did not qualify

=== Women's Team ===
Year	Division	League	Regular season	Playoffs
2022	3	USL W League	6th, Heartland	did not qualify

== Head coaches ==
- (Scotland) Tony Glavin (2006–2022)

== Stadia ==
- Glavin Soccer Complex; Cottleville, Missouri (2006–2022)
- Stadium at Lindenwood University; Saint Charles, Missouri 1 game (2011)

== Supporters ==
St. Louligans: Established in the summer of 2010 from multiple groups of then AC St. Louis supporters, The Louligans are the largest organized supporters group in the St. Louis area, in addition to being an all-soccer fan club by providing gameday support for Saint Louis FC, FC Adrenaline and Saint Louis Billikens Soccer Club.

== See also ==
- Soccer in St. Louis
