= Jarius Holmes =

American soccer player

Personal information
- Full name: Jarius Holmes
- Date of birth: March 26, 1986 (age 40)
- Place of birth: Japan
- Height: 5 ft 8 in (1.73 m)
- Position: Midfielder

Team information
- Current team: St. Louis Lions
- Number: 12

Youth career
- 2006–2007: McKendree Bearcats
- 2008: Southwestern Illinois Blue Storm

Senior career*
Years	Team	Apps	(Gls)
2007–2008	St. Louis Lions	30	(8)
2009	Austin Aztex	14	(1)
2010–	St. Louis Lions	14	(3)
- * Club domestic league appearances and goals as of August 7, 2010

Jarius Holmes (born March 26, 1986, in Japan) is an American soccer player, currently playing for St. Louis Lions in the USL Premier Development League.

== Career ==
=== Youth and amateur ===
Holmes grew up in Shiloh, Illinois, attended O'Fallon Township High School, and played college soccer at McKendree University and at Southwestern Illinois College. While at McKendree, he was two-time All-Conference selection and was named American Midwest Conference Newcomer of the Year in 2006. He was the first McKendree University player to sign a professional outdoor soccer contract.

During his college years, Holmes also played with the St. Louis Lions in the USL Premier Development League, and with local St. Louis amateur club, Fortels (FSC).

=== Professional ===
Holmes joined the USL First Division expansion franchise Austin Aztex in 2009. He made his professional debut on April 18, 2009, in Austin's USL1 season opener against Minnesota Thunder.

He was released by the Aztex at the end of the 2009 season., and re-signed for the St. Louis Lions in 2010.
