= Michael Dellorusso =

American soccer player

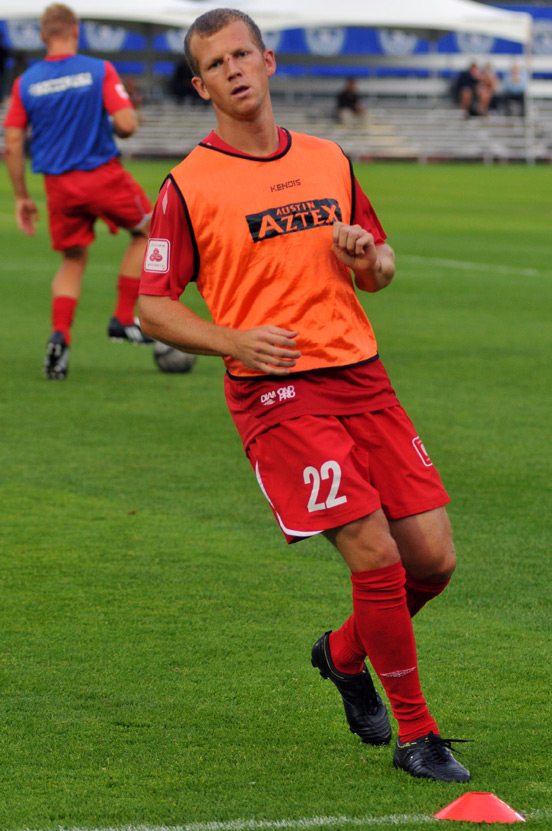

Personal information
- Full name: Michael James Dellorusso
- Date of birth: August 22, 1983 (age 43)
- Place of birth: White Plains, New York, United States
- Height: 5 ft 10 in (1.78 m)
- Position: Defender

College career
Years	Team	Apps	(Gls)
2001–2005	Maryland Terrapins		

Senior career*
Years	Team	Apps	(Gls)
2003–2004	Chesapeake Dragons	3	(0)
2006–2009	FC Dallas	11	(0)
2006	→ Minnesota Thunder (loan)	3	(0)
2009	Austin Aztex	7	(0)
2009–2010	Baltimore Blast (indoor)	0	(0)

Managerial career
- 2010–2013: University of Maryland (assistant)
- 2014–2015: Arizona United SC
- 2016: Rio Grande Valley Toros (assistant)
- 2017–2019: Houston Dynamo (assistant)
- * Club domestic league appearances and goals as of November 6, 2009

Michael Dellorusso (born August 22, 1983, in White Plains, New York) is an American former professional soccer player.

== Career ==
=== College ===
Dellorusso grew up in Columbia, Maryland, attended Wilde Lake High School, and played college soccer at the University of Maryland, College Park from 2001 to 2005. He appeared in 93 games over four seasons, scoring 2 goals and assisting on 20. He was named team captain in his junior and senior seasons.

During his college years he also played in the USL Premier Development League for Chesapeake Dragons.

=== Professional ===
Dellorusso was drafted in the fourth round, 42nd overall, of the 2006 MLS SuperDraft by FC Dallas. He spent part of his first season on loan with Minnesota Thunder of the USL First Division. In 2007, his second year with the team, Dellorusso made his first career MLS start on October 20, 2007, against the Kansas City Wizards in a 2–0 loss. He played the entire 90 minutes of the game at the right back position and would be his only MLS start of the 2007 season. During the 2008 MLS season, Dellorusso was promoted to the senior roster on May 7, 2007, replacing retired defender Alex Yi. He made eight regular season appearances with FC Dallas, starting one game on September 4, 2008, against the Colorado Rapids in a 1–0 loss.

Dellorusso was released by Dallas on July 23, 2009, and subsequently signed for Austin Aztex. He made 7 league appearances for the Aztex before being released at the end of the season.

In November 2009 Dellorusso signed to play professional indoor soccer for Baltimore Blast in the Major Indoor Soccer League during the 2009/10 USL-1 offseason.

=== Coaching ===
Dellorusso was an assistant coach for the University of Maryland men's soccer team from 2010 to 2013. He was named head coach of Arizona United SC on March 28, 2014. His record was 20 wins, 29 losses and 7 ties in two seasons. On September 25, 2015, Arizona United SC declined to renew his contract.
