= Ryan Caugherty =

Korean-born American soccer player (born 1982)

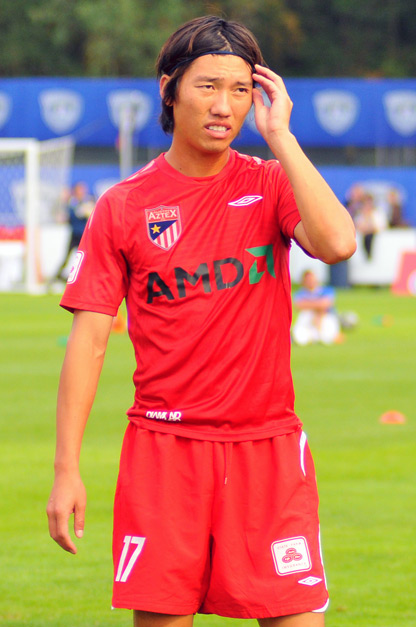

Personal information
- Full name: Ryan Caugherty
- Date of birth: September 23, 1982 (age 44)
- Place of birth: Seoul, South Korea
- Height: 6 ft 1 in (1.85 m)
- Position: Midfielder

Youth career
- 2001–2004: Wake Forest Demon Deacons

Senior career*
Years	Team	Apps	(Gls)
2004	Carolina Dynamo	12	(2)
2005	B 1909	15	(7)
2006	B 1913	10	(5)
2006	Bodens BK	15	(3)
2007	Carolina Dynamo	6	(1)
2007	Tatabánya	12	(1)
2008	Pittsburgh Riverhounds	12	(0)
2008–2009	Unirea Alba Iulia	0	(0)
2009	Austin Aztex	23	(0)
- * Club domestic league appearances and goals as of 6 November 2009

Ryan Caugherty (born September 23, 1982, in Seoul) is a Korean-born American soccer player, currently retired.

== Career ==
=== Youth and college ===
Caugherty grew up in Pittsburgh, Pennsylvania and attended Penn Hills High School, where he was named Section Player of the Year, All-WPIAL, All-State, and All-American. Caugherty played for the Region 1 ODP team along with attending the ESP camp. He played club soccer for Penns Forest and Pittsburgh Beadling, respectively, leading the latter to the national championships his senior year.

Caugherty played college soccer at Wake Forest University from 2001 to 2004. Playing left and right defender his freshman season to gain playing time, Caugherty saw a permanent move to the midfield in his sophomore season starting all eighteen games in which he appeared, missing only three due to injury. His junior and senior year saw nagging injuries interrupt his time on the field.

During his college years Caugherty also played for Carolina Dynamo in the USL Premier Development League.

=== Professional ===
Caugherty graduated from college early, in the winter of 2004, and was drafted by the Kansas City Wizards of Major League Soccer with the forty-seventh overall pick in the 2005 MLS Supplemental Draft. However, Caugherty expressed his desire to play abroad, and he eventually moved overseas to Europe without signing with MLS. Soon after being drafted by the Wizards, Caugherty moved to Denmark and signed with Odense-based club B 1909, a Danish second division team, before the start of the 2005 MLS season. He made an immediate impact in his professional debut for the club, gaining Man of the Match honors in his first five games with the club. Caugherty quickly gained attention from Danish Superliga clubs but saw a move to Viborg fall through. In the summer, Caugherty was offered a new two-year contract which he did not sign.

Caugherty chose to stay in Denmark, however, and signed a two-year contract with another Odense team, B 1913, in July 2005. Following some contract controversy, he left B 1913 just six months later to again attempt a move to Viborg.

Unable to reach a contract agreement with the Danish Superliga club he then moved to Swedish club Bodens BK in the winter of 2006, signing a two-year contract with the club. In his first pre-season game with the club Caugherty scored a goal but then later suffered an ankle injury on artificial grass which jeopardized his career. Recovering in less than six months, he made his debut for the club after the mid-season pause, going ninety minutes against Robertsfors IK.

After finishing his season in Sweden he was permitted to leave the club without fulfilling the full length of his contract, and he returned home to Carolina, taking up a place on the roster of his first club, Carolina Dynamo, in the USL Premier Development League.

Following the conclusion of the 2007 PDL season Caugherty signed a contract to return to Europe to play for Hungarian club FC Tatabánya, making his debut for the club against Újpest FC on September 15, 2007, but ultimately played just 12 games for the team, scoring one goal.

Caugherty returned to the area of his youth in 2008 when he signed with USL Second Division club Pittsburgh Riverhounds. He appeared in twelve games for the Hounds and collected one assist on the season. He was much less involved in the offense compared to his usual style, and developed a physical, defensive presence while assuming the team player role and moving to defense. While playing for the Riverhounds he took a job working for local business MrTakeOutBags.com.

It was announced on August 28, 2008, that Caugherty had moved from the Riverhounds to FC Unirea Alba Iulia of Romania, who play in Liga II in 2008–09.

However, Caugherty resurfaced in the United States again in 2009, and after a trial with Seattle Sounders FC, signed with USL First Division expansion franchise Austin Aztex. He left the Aztex at the end of the 2009 season.

Caugherty has now retired from soccer, and in 2011 he opened up the business Vaddo, Inc. in Houston, Texas. He continues to live in Houston with his wife Jaclyn.
