= Kendell McFayden =

American soccer player and coach (born 1988)

Personal information
- Date of birth: September 16, 1988 (age 38)
- Place of birth: Williamsville, New York, United States
- Height: 6 ft 0 in (1.83 m)
- Position: Forward

College career
Years	Team	Apps	(Gls)
2006–2009	Medaille Mavericks	81	(42)

Senior career*
Years	Team	Apps	(Gls)
2008	Cascade Surge	15	(3)
2009	Austin Aztex U23	16	(8)
2010	Austin Aztex	4	(1)
2011	Kitsap Pumas	6	(1)
2012	FC Buffalo	7	(3)
2012–2013	Rochester Rhinos	26	(3)
2014–2020	FC Buffalo	38	(15)

Managerial career
- 2013–2015: Medaille Mavericks (women; assistant)
- 2015–2016: Fredonia Blue Devils (assistant)
- * Club domestic league appearances and goals

Kendell McFayden (born September 16, 1988) is an American soccer player and coach who plays as a forward.

== Career ==
=== College and amateur ===
During his college years McFayden also played with the Austin Aztex U23 in the USL Premier Development League, scoring 8 goals in 16 games for the team.

=== Professional ===
McFayden turned professional in 2010 when he signed with the Austin Aztex in the USSF Division 2 Professional League. He made his professional debut, and scored his first professional goal, on July 31, 2010, in a 3–1 victory over Miami FC.

He was released by the Aztex at the end of the 2010 season, prior to their relocation to Florida and their rebranding as Orlando City. Having been unable to secure a professional contract elsewhere, McFayden signed to play with the Kitsap Pumas in the USL Premier Development League in 2011.

In March 2012 McFayden had a try out with USL Pro team Rochester Rhinos. He scored a goal in a preseason friendly against Colgate University.

McFayden returned to hometown club FC Buffalo in 2014, achieving the remarkable feat of becoming both the club's all-time leading goal scorer and the first FCB center back to be named to the NPSL Best XI. McFayden was the captain of FC Buffalo for the 2015 and 2016 seasons.

=== Coaching ===
McFayden works besides as soccer coach, from 2013 to 2015 as Assistant coach of the women soccer team of Medaille Mavericks and from 2015 to 2016 as Assistant coach of the Men soccer team of Fredonia State Blue Devils.
