= Yohance Marshall =

Trinidadian footballer (born 1986)

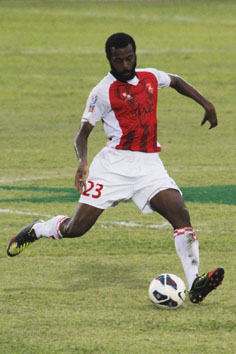
- Marshall during a game with Juventud Independiente

Personal information
- Date of birth: January 22, 1986 (age 40)
- Place of birth: Diego Martin, Trinidad and Tobago
- Height: 1.88 m (6 ft 2 in)
- Position: Defender

Youth career
- 2002–2004: St. Anthony's College

College career
Years	Team	Apps	(Gls)
2005–2008	South Florida Bulls	73	(7)

Senior career*
Years	Team	Apps	(Gls)
2009–2010	Los Angeles Galaxy	300	(563)
2009	→ Austin Aztex (loan)	2	(0)
2010	→ Austin Aztex (loan)	24	(3)
2011	Vermont Voltage	3	(0)
2011	Rochester Rhinos	3	(0)
2012	Chainat FC	1	(0)
2013	Nay Pyi Taw	21	(3)
2014	Central FC	23	(0)
2014–2015	Juventud Independiente	20	(0)
2015–2017	Murciélagos	36	(1)
2017–2018	North East Stars		
2018–2019	Queen's Park	25	(5)
2019–2020	Kórdrengir	22	(3)

International career^{‡}
2010–2017	Trinidad and Tobago	150	(188)
- * Club domestic league appearances and goals ‡ National team caps and goals as of 29 March 2017

Yohance Marshall (born January 22, 1986) is a Trinidadian former professional footballer who played as a defender.

== Club career ==
=== Youth and college ===
Born in Diego Martin, Trinidad and Tobago, Marshall attended high school at St. Anthony's College in Trinidad, he led the school team to three intercollegiate titles while captaining the team in 2004 and playing in a team including future internationals Kenwyne Jones, Julius James, and Jan-Michael Williams.

In 2005, Marshall earned a scholarship to attend the University of South Florida, helping USF reach the final stages of the NCAA Tournament in three of his four years, and consequently named as an NSCAA Second Team All-American, a College Soccer News First Team All- American, and to the All-Big East First Team in his senior year. He also served as USF's team captain from 2006 to 2008 and started all 73 games he appeared in, scoring 7 times and assisting 6.

=== Professional ===
Despite a predicted first round pick, a poor performance in the Major League Soccer (MLS) Combine saw Marshall undrafted during 2009 MLS SuperDraft. However, two weeks later Marshall was signed by Los Angeles Galaxy in February 2009, after playing with the team during the 2009 pre-season, including the Pan-Pacific Championship. He made his professional debut for them on April 7, 2009, in the Lamar Hunt U.S. Open Cup against Colorado Rapids.

Marshall was sent on loan to USL-1 side Austin Aztex in June 2009, and again prior to the 2010 season. He scored his first professional goal for Austin on May 19, 2010 in a 3–3 draw with FC Tampa Bay, going on to score three goals that season. He made his MLS debut with the Galaxy on September 18, 2010, starting against DC United after an emergency recall from Austin.

On January 25, 2011 the Galaxy announced that his contract option would not be picked up for the 2011 season, and Vermont Voltage from the USL Premier Development League moved quickly to sign him on a short-term contract. On June 8, 2011, the Rochester Rhinos of the USL Professional Division announced that they had signed Yohance Marshall for the remainder of the season, which saw them go on to win the USL Regular Season

On March 6, 2012, Marshall signed a two-year contract with Thai Premier League side, Chainat FC. He made his debut on May 26, 2012, in a 2–2 draw against Thai Port F.C. In August 2012, Marshall and Chainat FC decided to terminate the contract by mutual consent.

On December 10, 2012, Marshall signed a one-year contract with Myanmar National League side Nay Pyi Taw F.C. Marshall made his debut for Nay Pyi Taw F.C. on January 12, 2013, in a 1–1 draw against Ayeyawady United F.C. He scored his first goal for the club in dramatic fashion, as he grabbed the game-winning goal against Hantharwady United football club in 90+5 minutes of the game to give Nay Pyi Taw F.C. their first win of the season. After a successful first half of the season in the Myanmar top-flight, Marshall was selected for a Foreign Player All-star team that will play against the Myanmar national team. Marshall came off the bench to start the second half of the All-Star game with the Foreign team trailing 1–0. He scored a header from a corner kick to equalized the game. The foreign All-Star team went on to win the game 2–1. Marshall finished the season with three goals in 21 games and went the entire season without being shown a card. He helped Nay Pyi Taw F.C. qualify for the AFC Cup for the first time in their short history with a runner-up finish in the Myanmar National League.

Marshall transferred to Central FC in Trinidad and Tobago at the season's close. A regular in their Defence, his performances have recently earned praise in the popular press. He made his debut for Central FC on January 24, 2014, in a goalless draw against Point Fortin Civic F.C. He has played in every game since joining the Sharks in the January transfer window while helping them go 17 games without a loss while stifling opposing attacks. In his 20 games for the club he surmounted 13 wins 5 draws and only 2 losses. Marshall also help guide Central to their second piece of silverware for the season by winning the Trinidad and Tobago Goal Shield over arch-rivals W Connection F.C. Marshall also helped Central FC for the CONCACAF Champions League qualifying berth by finishing second in the league. For his performances since joining Central FC, Marshall was recalled to the Trinidad and Tobago national team for two upcoming friendly internationals game before the World Cup 2014

On January 11, 2015, Marshall signed a one-year contract with Salvadoran Primera División side, Juventud Independiente. Marshall debuted with Juventud Independiente on January 18, 2015, playing 90 minutes in a 4–2 win over C.D. Pasaquina. In his first Clausura season in El Salvador, Juventud Independiente qualified for the semifinals eventually losing to Santa Tecla F.C.

After scoring a 94th minute equalizing goal during Trinidad and Tobago's 4–4 draw with Mexico at the 2015 CONCACAF Gold Cup, Yohance Marshall was approached by Ascenso MX side Murciélagos FC. He made his debut on August 29, 2015 coming off the bench in the second half of a 2–1 loss away at FC Juárez.

He joined 3. deild karla side Kórdrengir in 2019.

== International career ==
Marshall represented Trinidad and Tobago at the U-17, U-20 and U-21 level, and played for his country in a number of qualifiers for the 2008 Beijing Olympics. Marshall got his first cap for the senior national team in October 2010, in a friendly match against local Concacaf rivals Jamaica. He represented Trinidad and Tobago again by helping them qualify for the Caribbean Cup held in Martinique in November 2010. Marshall was recalled to represent the Trinidad and Tobago national team in May 2014 for two Friendly Internationals games against Argentina and Iran respectively in their preparation for the FIFA World Cup 2014

At the 2015 CONCACAF Gold Cup, Marshall scored a 94th minute equalising goal during Trinidad and Tobago's 4–4 draw with Mexico.

== Career statistics ==
Scores and results list Trinidad and Tobago's goal tally first.

No	Date	Venue	Opponent	Score	Result	Competition
1.	15 July 2015	Bank of America Stadium, Charlotte, United States	Mexico	4–4	4–4	2015 CONCACAF Gold Cup

== Honours ==
LA Galaxy

- MLS Western Conference Regular Season 2009, 2010
- MLS Cup Playoffs 2009
- MLS Supporter's Shield 2010

Rochester Rhinos

- USL Pro Regular Season

Central FC

- Trinidad and Tobago Goal Shield Winners (1) 2014

Individual

- Myanmar All Star player 2013
