= Randi Patterson =

Trinidadian footballer (born 1985)

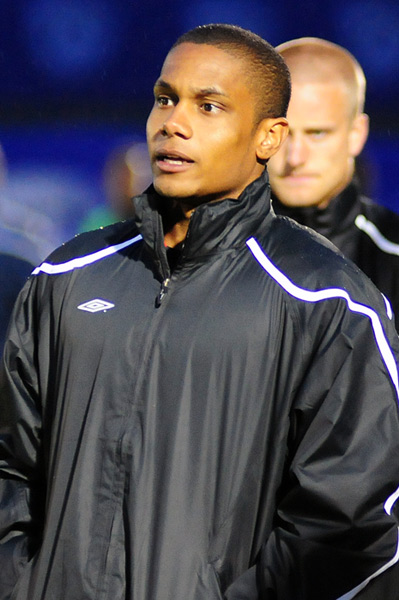

Personal information
- Full name: Randi Luther Pereira-Patterson
- Date of birth: 16 April 1985 (age 41)
- Place of birth: Hackensack, New Jersey, U.S.
- Height: 1.75 m (5 ft 9 in)
- Position: Forward

College career
Years	Team	Apps	(Gls)
2003–2006	UNC Greensboro Spartans		

Senior career*
Years	Team	Apps	(Gls)
2006	Carolina Dynamo	14	(15)
2007	New York Red Bulls	0	(0)
2008	Chicago Storm (indoor)	7	(0)
2008–2009	Charleston Battery	54	(14)
2010	Crystal Palace Baltimore	17	(4)
2010	Austin Aztex	12	(2)

International career^{‡}
2023	Trinidad and Tobago	2	(0)
- * Club domestic league appearances and goals as of 3 October 2010 ‡ National team caps and goals as of 14 April 2009

Randi Luther Pereira-Patterson (born 16 April 1985), known as Randi Patterson, is a footballer who plays as a forward. Born in the United States, he has been a member of the Trinidad and Tobago national team.

== College career ==
Patterson spent four seasons at the University of North Carolina at Greensboro, where he was a two-time Southern Conference Player of the Year and National Soccer Coaches Association of America All-American selection. He finished his college career with 61 goals and 19 assists. Patterson grew up in Teaneck, New Jersey, raised by his mother after his father was killed in a car accident when he was two years old, and attended Bergen Catholic High School in Oradell, New Jersey, whom he led to the 1999 state championship. During his college years he also played with Carolina Dynamo of the USL Premier Development League, scoring 15 goals in his 14 games in 2006.

== Club career ==
New York Red Bulls selected Patterson with its first round pick in the 2007 MLS Supplemental Draft in January 2007. He was waived on February 18, 2008.

In March 2008, he scored on his debut for Charleston Battery against Toronto FC in the Carolina Challenge Cup In the fall of 2008, he joined the Chicago Storm of the Xtreme Soccer League, and played for them during the outdoor offseason, before re-joining Charleston prior to the 2009 USL1 season.

== International career ==
Patterson's father, Earl Pereira, was born in Trinidad, Trinidad and Tobago. He made his debut for the Soca Warriors in a March 2008 friendly match against El Salvador.

== Career statistics ==
(correct as of 26 July 2010)

Club	Season	League			Cup			Play-Offs			Total		
Club	Season	Apps	Goals	Assists	Apps	Goals	Assists	Apps	Goals	Assists	Apps	Goals	Assists
Carolina Dynamo	2006	14	15	?	?	4	?	-	-	-	14	15	?
New York Red Bulls	2007	0	0	0	0	0	0	0	0	0	0	0	0
Charleston Battery	2008	30	8	1	6	2	0	2	0	0	38	10	1
Charleston Battery	2009	24	6	2	4	3	0	1	0	0	29	9	2
Crystal Palace Baltimore	2010	17	4	0	1	0	0	-	-	-	18	4	0
Total	2006–present	85	33	3	11	9	0	3	0	0	99	38	3
