= Jay Needham =

American soccer player (born 1984)

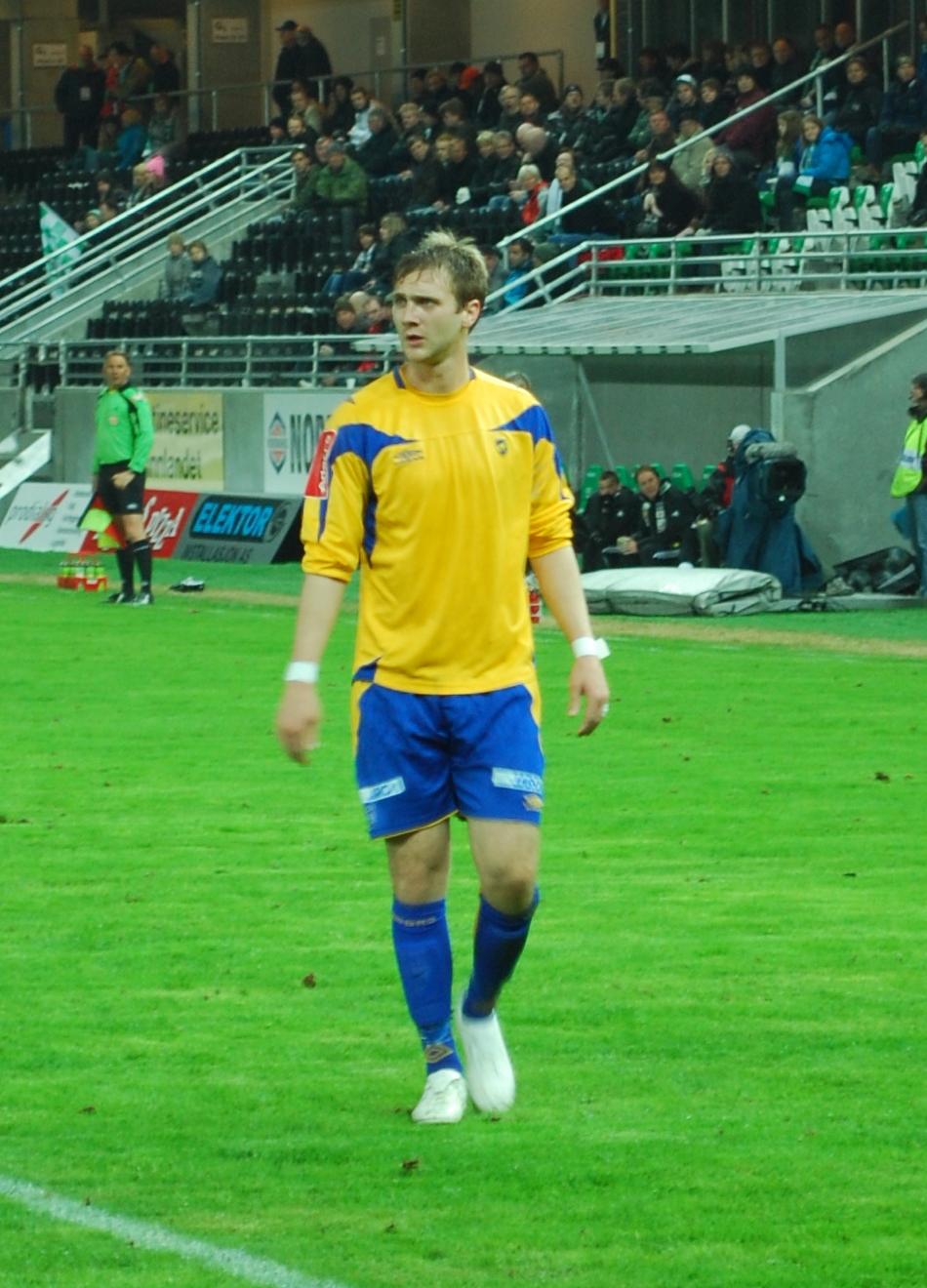
- Needham with Alta IF

Personal information
- Full name: Jay Charles Needham
- Date of birth: September 30, 1984 (age 42)
- Place of birth: Fort Worth, Texas, United States
- Height: 6 ft 2 in (1.88 m)
- Position: Defender

Youth career
- 1998–2003: Dallas Texans

College career
Years	Team	Apps	(Gls)
2003–2006	SMU Mustangs		

Senior career*
Years	Team	Apps	(Gls)
2006	DFW Tornados	14	(2)
2007	Puerto Rico Islanders	35	(1)
2008–2009	Alta IF	50	(3)
2010	Austin Aztex	25	(2)
2011–2012	Puerto Rico Islanders	47	(8)
2013–2014	Tampa Bay Rowdies	22	(2)
- * Club domestic league appearances and goals

Jay Charles Needham (born September 30, 1984) is an American former professional soccer player who played as a central defender or defensive midfielder for teams in Norway, Puerto Rico and the United States.

== College and amateur career ==
Needham was born in Fort Worth, Texas. He played youth soccer with the Dallas Texans Soccer Club. His team, Dallas Texans Red '85's, won four North Texas State Cup titles (2000–2003), three Southern Regional titles (2000–2002) and twice competed in the U.S. Youth National Championship final four (2001–2002). His team also won the Under 19 Division of the prestigious Dallas Cup in 2003. Other professionals playing for this Texans team were Hunter Freeman and Ramón Núñez.

After graduating from Arlington Heights High School, Needham played college soccer at Southern Methodist University. While at SMU, Needham was a member of the Missouri Valley Conference Tournament Champion in 2003, the Missouri Valley Conference Season and Tournament Champions in 2004. After the 2004 season, SMU participated in Conference USA. The Mustangs were the Conference USA Season Champion in 2005 and the Season and Tournament Champions in 2006. The Mustangs participated in the NCAA Soccer Tournament all four years that Needham played advancing to the College Cup (final four) in 2005. SMU fell to Maryland (the eventual NCAA Champions) in the semi-finals.

Needham earned several honors during his career at SMU. He was named to the Missouri Valley Conference 1st Team All Freshman squad in 2003. After SMU moved to Conference USA in 2005, Needham was named 1st Team All Conference in 2005 and 2006. Conference USA named him Defender of the Year in 2006. He earned 1st Team Midwest Region honors in 2005 and 2006. The NSCAA name him 1st Team All American in 2006. Needham was also a Finalist for the Missouri Athletic Club's Hermann Trophy (given to that year's best college soccer player) in 2006.

During his time at SMU, Needham played summer soccer in the USL Premier Development League with the DFW Tornados.

== Professional career ==
=== United States ===
Needham was drafted by D.C. United in the third round of the 2007 MLS SuperDraft, but after attending training camp, he and D.C. United were unable to come to contract terms. He signed with the Puerto Rico Islanders in the USL First Division. On arrival, he was asked to change positions from center to outside fullback. While with the Islanders, Needham played both right and left fullback, logging over 2,000 minutes of play. The Islanders advanced to the USL semi-finals where they were defeated by the ultimate champions, Seattle. They also advanced to the semi-finals of the 2007 Caribbean Club Cup.

At the end of the season, Needham was named the 2007 USL Division 1 Rookie of the Year.

=== Norway ===
In March 2008, Needham transferred to Alta IF in Alta Municipality in Finnmark county, Norway. Alta had just won promotion to play in Norway's Adeccoligaen. He made his debut on April 13 and retained a starting central defender position throughout the remainder of the season. During the 2008 season, Needham appeared in 24 league games, logging more than 2,000 minutes of play. He also appeared in two Norwegian Cup matches. Needham was named the team's Captain for their final four games.

At the end of the season, Alta retained its position in the Adeccoligaen. This was only the second time in the club's history that it had not been relegated the season after being promoted into the Adeccoligaen.

2009 was Alta's most successful season in the Adeccoligaen. The team ended the season with 42 points (a club record). Their 6th-place finish out of 16 teams was the highest finish ever achieved by the club. During their run into the fourth round of the Norwegian Cup, Alta defeated Tippeligaen team, Bodo Glimt, 3–0.

Needham played in 26 leagues games and two Cup matches. For the third consecutive season, he logged more than 2,000 minutes in league play. During the season, he played right fullback, center fullback, and defensive (holding) mid-field. After being moved into the mid-field, he played 19 games as Alta's holding mid-fielder. He also played defensive mid-field in two Cup matches. Needham served as the team's captain from May 21 through the end of the season.

In August, he was selected one of the Adeccoligaen's top foreign players by Football Magazine Norway. In September, the New York Times Soccer Blog named Needham one of the top 11 American uncapped players in Europe. After the close of the season, he left Norway in November.

=== United States, Part II ===
Needham signed a three-year contract with the Austin Aztex of the USL First Division at the end of January 2010. During the 2010 season, Needham played central defender. He appeared in 25 league games playing over 2,100 minutes for the Aztex. Austin accumulated a team record 53 points for the season, finishing one point out of first place. With their high finish, Austin also earned a playoff spot for the first time in team history. Austin ultimately fell to Montreal in the playoffs. Needham appeared in both of Austin's playoff games logging 180 minutes. After the close of the 2010 season, the Austin Aztex announced they were relocating to Orlando Florida and would play under the team name, Orlando City Soccer Club. At the end of November, he was released from his contract by OCSC.

On February 2, 2011, it was announced that he would be returning to the Puerto Rico Islanders. The Islanders' first Cup competition of 2011 was the Caribbean Club Cup. The Islanders defended their title as cup holders defeating Tempete of Haiti 3–1 in overtime. During the tournament, Needham played every minute of every game including the 240 minutes to complete both the semi-final and final overtime games. As a part of his play, Needham scored the first goal of the Championship match. In the CONCACAF Champions League, the Islanders faced Metapan of El Salvador in a home and home play-in series. Needham played all 180 minutes of both games. The aggregate score was 3-3. Metapan advanced on away goals. During the regular North American Soccer League season, he appeared in 19 games scoring two goals, both game winners. The Islanders finished second in the league standings and lost in the semi-finals of the NASL playoffs.

During 2011, Needham appeared in 27 games for the Islanders, playing more than 2,300 minutes in all competition. He ended the year with 3 goals. Needham re-signed with the Islanders in January 2012.

The Islanders' first Cup competition of 2012 was again the CFU Caribbean Club Cup. During the competition, Needham appeared in all four of the Islanders' games playing all 360 minutes. Puerto Rico finished third after losing to W Connection of Trinidad Tabago in the semi-finals. The Tropa Naranja defeated Antigua Baracudas 2–0 in the third place game to earn a spot in the CONCACAF Champions League. For the Champions League, the Islanders were placed in Group 5 with Isidro Metapan (El Salvador) and the LA Galaxy (USA). The Tropa Naranja started on the road losing to Metapan and the Galaxy. Needham did not play in the road loss to LA due to suspension. Returning home, the Islanders defeated Metapan and tied LA 0–0. In the tie with the Galaxy, Needham was noted as being a major factor in the Islanders improved performance.

In 2012 NASL play, the Islanders finished third. Needham played for 2,236 minutes in the NASL games and scored three goals. He also played the full 90 minutes in the PRI's 2–1 Quarter-finals loss to the Minnesota Stars. During the NASL season, the Islanders shut out their opponents 12 times. When their NASL shoutouts are added with the three shut outs from CFU Club competition and two in the CONCACAF CCL play, the Islanders shut out their opponents 17 times during the year. Needham appeared and played the full 90 minutes in all but one of the shut outs.

On January 7, 2013, the Tampa Bay Rowdies announced they had signed Needham to a three-year contract. In 2013, the North American Soccer League played two split seasons, spring and fall. Although injured for all of May, Needham appeared in eight NASL games during the Spring Season, scoring one goal. He also played all 90 minutes in the Rowdies' U.S. Open Cup loss to the Portland Timbers. During the Fall Season, he appeared in 12 games scoring one goal. For the combined 2013 NASL season, Needham played in 20 league games. He totaled 1,481 minutes of playing time and scored two goals. Twice, he was named to the NASL's Team of the Week.

At the start of 2014, Jay fell out of favor with the Tampa Bay coach. He appeared in two Spring Season games, coming on a substitute in the 90th minute in one game and playing the full 90 minutes against the N.Y. Cosmos. He did not play during the Fall Season. Needham also played the full 90 minutes in exhibition games against the Orlando City Soccer Club and the Costa Rica National Team (closed game in Bradenton, FL). At the close of the 2014 season, Tampa Bay did not extend Jay's contract.

=== Post Professional Playing Career ===
Jay Needham retired from football at the end of the 2014 season. On November 12, 2021, Jay was inducted into the SMU Athletic Hall of Fame. At the time of his induction, he became one of only three SMU soccer players to be inducted into the SMU Athletic Hall of Fame.
