= Stephan Campbell =

Trinidadian footballer

Personal information
- Full name: Stephan Campbell
- Date of birth: August 26, 1990 (age 36)
- Place of birth: San Fernando, Trinidad and Tobago
- Height: 6 ft 0 in (1.83 m)
- Position: Midfielder

Team information
- Current team: Austin Aztex
- Number: 61

Senior career*
Years	Team	Apps	(Gls)
2009	United Petrotrin		
2010	Austin Aztex	3	(0)
2010–2011	Orlando City	3	(0)

International career
2007	Trinidad and Tobago U-17	2	(1)
- * Club domestic league appearances and goals

Stephan Campbell (born August 26, 1990 in San Fernando) is a Trinidadian footballer.

== Career ==
=== Club ===
Campbell attended Presentation College in his native Trinidad, and turned professional in 2009 when he signed for United Petrotrin of the TT Pro League. He scored three goals for United Petrotrin in the 2009 season.

Campbell moved to the United States in 2010 and signed with the Austin Aztex of the USSF Division 2. He made his debut for the team on May 1, 2010, in a 2-1 victory over the NSC Minnesota Stars. In October 2010 signed for Orlando City Soccer Club and played until march 2011 to his release, three games for the club.

=== International ===
Campbell has represented Trinidad and Tobago at various youth levels, ranging from U-17 to U-23. He was a member of the Trinidad team that participated in the 2007 FIFA U-17 World Cup, where he scored his country's lone goal in the competition.
