= Mechack Jérôme =

Haitian footballer (born 1990)

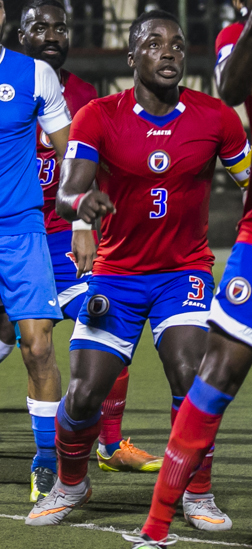
- Jérôme with Haiti in 2017

Personal information
- Date of birth: April 21, 1990 (age 36)
- Place of birth: Liancourt, Haiti
- Height: 5 ft 10 in (1.78 m)
- Position: Defender

Senior career*
Years	Team	Apps	(Gls)
2006–2009	Baltimore SC		
2009–2010	SC Mirandela	4	(0)
2010	Austin Aztex FC	3	(0)
2011–2012	Orlando City SC	34	(2)
2013–2014	Sporting Kansas City	12	(0)
2014	Montreal Impact	0	(0)
2015	Charlotte Independence	17	(0)
2015–2018	Jacksonville Armada	81	(3)
2019–2021	El Paso Locomotive	51	(0)
2022–2023	Indy Eleven	55	(0)
2024	Union Omaha	19	(1)

International career^{‡}
2008–2022	Haiti	80	(4)
- * Club domestic league appearances and goals as of November 25, 2024 ‡ National team caps and goals as of March 27, 2022

Mechack Jérôme (born April 21, 1990) is a Haitian professional footballer.

== Club career ==
Jérôme played for Baltimore in the Ligue Haïtienne, and then for Mirandela in the Portuguese Second Division, before being spotted by Austin Aztex head coach Adrian Heath while playing for the Haiti national team in a friendly match against the Aztex on April 28, 2010.

Jérôme signed for the Aztex in June 2010 and made his debut for the team on September 11, 2010, in a 3–1 loss to the Puerto Rico Islanders. Prior to the 2011 season, new owners purchased the club, moved it to Orlando, Florida, renamed it Orlando City and joined the USL Pro league for 2011.

He signed a multi-year contract with Orlando City on September 1, 2011.

Jérôme was signed by Sporting Kansas City of Major League Soccer on February 28, 2013. The club released him on March 31, 2014.

On June 6, 2014, he signed with Montreal Impact. He was released three weeks later.

Jérôme signed with Charlotte Independence of United Soccer League on May 1, 2015. He then signed with Jacksonville Armada FC of the North American Soccer League in September 2015. Two months later he re-signed with Jacksonville for the 2016 season.

Jérôme signed with USL Championship expansion club El Paso Locomotive on January 21, 2019. El Paso re-signed Jérôme for the 2020 season on November 21.

In December 2021, it was announced Jérôme would make the move to Indy Eleven ahead of the 2022 season.

On November 30, 2023, Indy Eleven announced Jérôme's departure from the club upon the expiration of his contract.

On January 30, 2024, Jérôme signed with Union Omaha of USL League One for the 2024 season. He made his debut on March 16 in a 2–1 win over Central Valley Fuego FC, replacing defender Will Perkins in the 73rd minute.

Jérôme was not listed on Union Omaha's 2025 roster due to injury.

== International career ==
Jerome played for Haiti at the 2007 CONCACAF U17 Tournament and the 2007 FIFA U-17 World Cup, before making his debut for the full senior Haiti national team in 2008. He was part of the Haiti squad which competed in the 2008 Caribbean Championship, and helped his country qualify for the 2009 CONCACAF Gold Cup.

== Personal life ==
On October 31, 2024, a propane tank in a garage at Jérôme's duplex home in Bellevue, Nebraska exploded, causing severe damage to the building and injuring him, his wife, and cousin, the latter two of whom were severely injured; all three were subsequently hospitalized. According to Bellevue Fire Department Captain Frank Guido, the propane tank is believed to have exploded because unrestrained propane vapors ignited due to the garage not being well-ventilated, and that a lighter and cell phone were found near the gas source.

Union Omaha raised over $47,000 to cover Jérôme and his family's medical costs. He has expressed a desire to play football again upon his recovery.

== Career statistics ==
=== International ===
As of match played 15 October 2023

Appearances and goals by national team and year
National team	Year	Apps	Goals
Haiti	2008	10	0
Haiti	2009	5	0
Haiti	2010	4	0
Haiti	2012	5	0
Haiti	2013	6	0
Haiti	2014	9	1
Haiti	2015	10	1
Haiti	2016	11	1
Haiti	2017	6	0
Haiti	2018	5	0
Haiti	2019	5	1
Haiti	2021	1	0
Haiti	2022	1	0
Haiti	2023	2	0
Total		80	4

Scores and results list Haiti's goal tally first, score column indicates score after each Jérôme goal.

List of international goals scored by Mechack Jérôme
No.	Date	Venue	Opponent	Score	Result	Competition	Ref.
1	18 November 2014	Montego Bay Sports Complex, Montego Bay, Jamaica	Cuba	1–0	2–1	2014 Caribbean Cup	
2	4 September 2015	National Cricket Stadium, St. George's, Grenada	Grenada	2–1	3–1	2018 FIFA World Cup qualification	
3	9 November 2016	Stade Sylvio Cator, Port-au-Prince, Haiti	French Guiana	1–0	2–5	2017 Caribbean Cup qualification	
4	11 June 2019	San José, Costa Rica	Guyana	1–0	3–1	Friendly	

== Honours ==
Baltimore SC

- Ligue Haïtienne: 2007

Orlando City

- USL Pro: 2011

Sporting Kansas City

- MLS Cup: 2013
