= Sean Kelley =

American former soccer player (born 1988)

Personal information
- Full name: Sean William Kelley
- Date of birth: April 15, 1988 (age 38)
- Place of birth: Lexington, Kentucky, United States
- Height: 6 ft 4 in (1.93 m)
- Position: Goalkeeper

College career
Years	Team	Apps	(Gls)
2006–2009	George Mason Patriots		

Senior career*
Years	Team	Apps	(Gls)
2009	Northern Virginia Royals	11	(0)
2010	Austin Aztex	1	(0)
2011–2013	Orlando City	6	(0)
- * Club domestic league appearances and goals as of August 4, 2012

Sean William Kelley (born April 15, 1988) is an American former soccer player. He played for American teams during his career which lasted from 2009 to 2013.

== Career ==
=== College and amateur ===
Kelley was born in Lexington, Kentucky and attended Paul Laurence Dunbar High School before going on to play four years of college soccer at George Mason University. As a freshman, he was named the Colonial Athletic Association Rookie of the Year, to the All-CAA Second Team and the 2006 College Soccer News All-Freshman First Team, and earned NSCAA All-South Atlantic Region Third Team honors, while as a junior and senior he earned All-CAA honors for the second and third time. He started all 77 games of his collegiate career, and had a goals against average of less than 1 goal per game.

During his college years Kelley also played with the Northern Virginia Royals in the USL Premier Development League.

=== Professional ===
Kelley was spotted by Austin Aztex head coach Adrian Heath while attending an open tryout with Major League Soccer team FC Dallas in March 2010, who signed him to a one-year contract, primarily to act as backup to first-choice goalkeeper Miguel Gallardo. He made his professional debut on September 18, 2010, in a 2–1 loss to AC St. Louis. Prior to the 2011 season, new owners purchased the club and moved it to Orlando, Florida, renaming it Orlando City S.C.

Kelley was key in the Lions' 2011 USL Pro Championships title game. He entered in the second half when Miguel Gallardo received a red card for dragging down a Harrisburg City Islanders player on a breakaway. Despite surrendering a goal late in extended time, and another early in overtime, he got a chance to atone when the Lions scored on an penalty kick near the end of overtime. In penalty kicks, Kelley stopped the first two Islanders shots as he and the Lions won, 3–2, in PKs. Kelley was voted game MVP.

Kelley started four matches in 2012 for Orlando City, including the season opener, which Gallardo had to sit out due to his red card in the Championship Game. He initially was released after the 2012 season to be replaced by Jon Kempin, a reserve loanee from Sporting Kansas City. But Kelley was re-signed by the team on April 3, 2013, following a knee injury to Gallardo.

== Honors ==
Orlando City

- USL Pro: 2011
