= Sam Brill =

American soccer player

Personal information
- Full name: Samuel Brill
- Date of birth: September 6, 1985 (age 41)
- Place of birth: Newton, Massachusetts, United States
- Height: 6 ft 2 in (1.88 m)
- Position: Defender

Youth career
- 2003–2006: Boston College Eagles

Senior career*
| Years | Team | Apps | (Gls) |
| 2008 | New England Revolution | 0 | (0) |
| 2009 | Sachsen Leipzig | 2 | (0) |
| 2009–2010 | Ljungskile SK | 10 | (0) |
| 2010 | Austin Aztex | 4 | (0) |
Medal record
Men's football (soccer)
Representing United States
Maccabiah Games
| Silver medal – second place | 2005 Maccabiah | Football |
- * Club domestic league appearances and goals as of October 3, 2010 ‡ National team caps and goals as of July 14, 2009

Sam Brill (born September 6, 1985, in Newton, Massachusetts) is an American soccer player who retired from professional soccer in October 2011.

== Career ==
=== College ===
A four-year starter at Boston College, manning the backline from 2003 through 2006. Appeared in 63 games at BC, starting 58 in his career. Scored six goals and added three assists for the Eagles. Had his best offensive year as a senior, scoring a career-high three goals and adding two assists. Earned All-Big East honors as a sophomore in 2004 as he anchored the Eagles’ defense that allowed just 10 goals in 20 matches. As a senior, helped give the Eagles their first ACC victory scoring the game-tying goal and assisting on the game-winning goal in overtime against Virginia Tech. His headed goal against Connecticut sent BC past their regional rivals, 1–0, in the second round of the 2004 NCAA Tournament.

=== Professional ===
Brill made his full professional debut – and scored his first goal – for Revolution on July 1, 2008, in a US Open Cup third-round game against Richmond Kickers. According to the German magazine Kicker, he signed up with FC Sachsen Leipzig, a German Regionalliga team, in early February 2009., he left after only two games the Regionalliga Nord team Sachsen Leipzig due to the club going bankrupt.

On March 31, 2009, signed with Ljungskile SK, and played 10 games for them during the 2009–2010 season, before returning to the United States to sign for the Austin Aztex in the USSF Division 2 Professional League.
