= Michael Callahan (soccer) =

American soccer player and coach

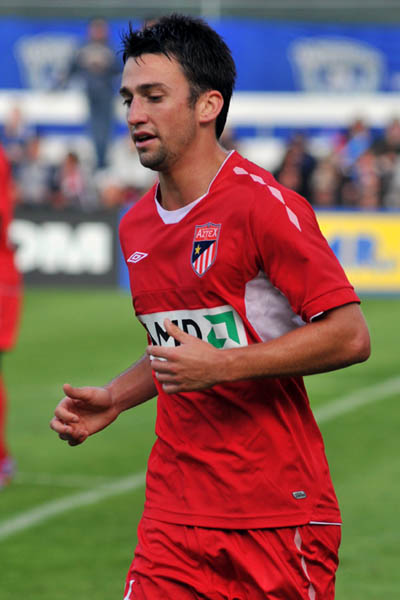
- Callahan with Austin Aztex in 2010

Personal information
- Full name: Michael Benjamin Callahan
- Date of birth: January 7, 1987 (age 39)
- Place of birth: Red Bank, New Jersey, United States
- Height: 5 ft 9 in (1.75 m)
- Position: Midfielder

Youth career
- 2005–2008: North Carolina Tar Heels

Senior career*
Years	Team	Apps	(Gls)
2005–2006	Raleigh Elite	5	(1)
2007–2008	Cary RailHawks U23s	27	(6)
2009–2010	Austin Aztex	47	(1)
2011–2016	Richmond Kickers	119	(5)
2013	→ Carolina RailHawks (loan)	1	(0)

Managerial career
- 2016–2018: Richmond Kickers (assistant)
- * Club domestic league appearances and goals as of January 28, 2017

Michael Benjamin Callahan (born January 7, 1987) is an American soccer player and coach.

== Career ==
=== Youth and amateur ===
Callahan was born in Red Bank, New Jersey. He grew up in Cary, North Carolina and attended Green Hope High School. He played college soccer at the University of North Carolina at Chapel Hill, where he was named to the ACC's All-Freshman Team in 2005, was named to the ACC Academic Honor Roll in his freshman, sophomore and junior years, and earned All-ACC and All-American honors in 2008.

During his college years Callahan also played four seasons in the USL Premier Development League with the Raleigh Elite team, which later became the Cary RailHawks U23s.

=== Professional ===
Callahan joined the USL First Division expansion franchise Austin Aztex in 2009. He made his professional debut on April 25, 2009, as a second-half substitute in Austin's game against Cleveland City Stars. Callahan set an infamous USL First Division record by getting a red card, and subsequent ejection, 53 seconds into a game for a dangerous slide tackle.

After two seasons with Austin, Callahan signed with Richmond Kickers of the USL Pro league on March 29, 2011. Richmond re-signed Callahan to a multi-year contract on November 16, 2011.
