= Lawrence Olum =

Kenyan professional footballer (born 1984)

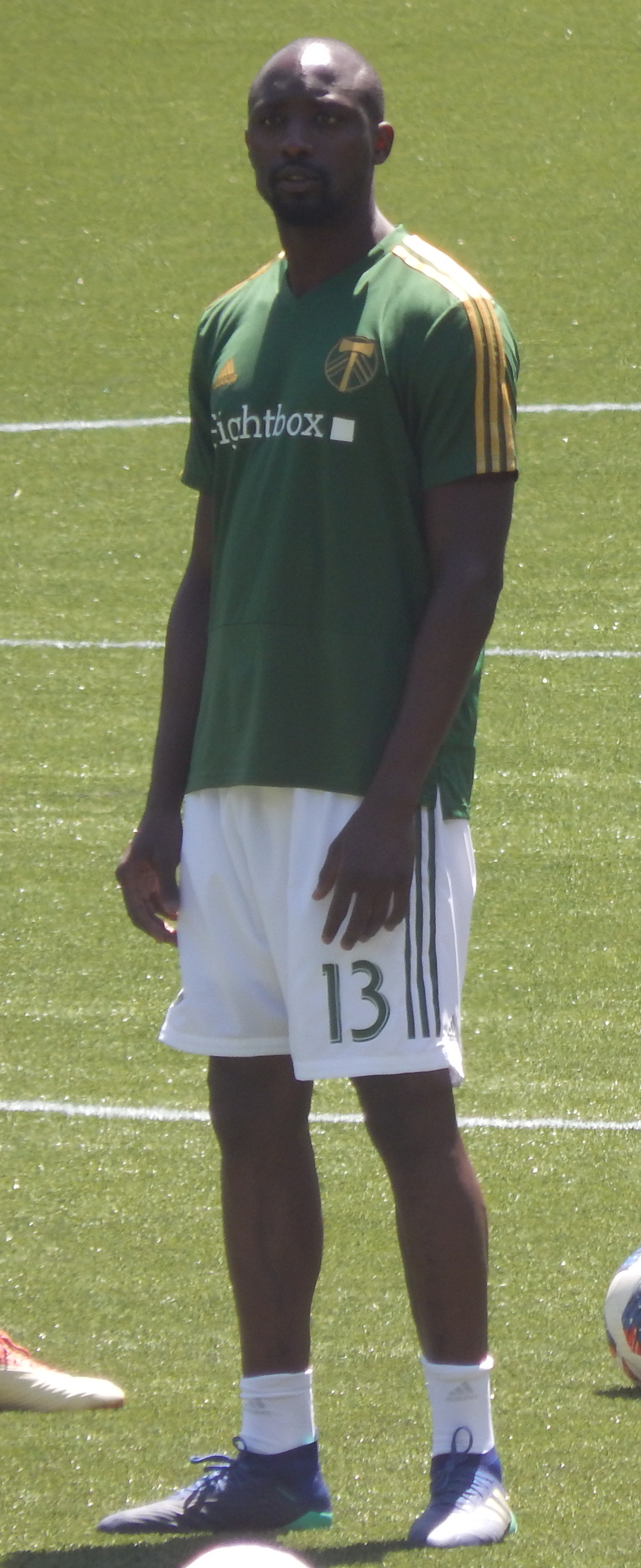

Personal information
- Date of birth: 10 July 1984 (age 42)
- Place of birth: Nairobi, Kenya
- Positions: Defender; midfielder

College career
Years	Team	Apps	(Gls)
2003–2006	Missouri Baptist Spartans		

Senior career*
Years	Team	Apps	(Gls)
2006	St. Louis Lions	16	(9)
2007–2008	Portland Timbers	44	(6)
2009	Minnesota Thunder	28	(5)
2010	Austin Aztex	21	(3)
2011	Orlando City	21	(0)
2011–2014	Sporting Kansas City	67	(3)
2015	Kedah FA	6	(0)
2016	Sporting Kansas City	19	(2)
2017–2018	Portland Timbers	52	(2)
2019	Minnesota United	10	(0)
2020	Miami FC	1	(0)

International career^{‡}
2014–2015	Kenya	4	(0)
- * Club domestic league appearances and goals as of 7 March 2020 ‡ National team caps and goals as of 6 September 2015

Lawrence Olum (born 10 July 1984) is a Kenyan professional footballer who plays as a defender and midfielder.

== Career ==
=== College and amateur ===
Olum spent four years playing college soccer at Missouri Baptist University, earning NAIA honorable mention All-America honors three times. After playing collegiately from 2006 to 2009, Olum officially graduated from Missouri Baptist University in 2019 and was inducted into its Hall of Fame in 2021.

Olum began his post-college career in 2006 season with the St. Louis Lions of the USL Premier Development League, scoring 9 goals in 16 games.

=== Professional ===
Olum turned professional with the Portland Timbers of the USL First Division in 2007, before moving to the Minnesota Thunder in March 2009. He later played for the Austin Aztex and Orlando City, before moving to Sporting Kansas City of Major League Soccer in September 2011.

Olum moved to Kedah FA in the Malaysia Premier League ahead of the 2015 season. After one season abroad, he re-signed with Sporting Kansas City in December 2015.

On 3 February 2017, Olum was traded to Portland Timbers, now of MLS, in exchange for $50,000 in general allocation money and a first-round pick in the 2018 MLS SuperDraft. Olum was released by Portland on 10 December 2018.

On 15 March 2019, Olum was signed by Minnesota United FC.

On 16 January 2020, Olum was signed by Miami FC ahead of their first season in the USL Championship.

== International career ==
Olum was the subject of interest from the Kenyan national team in November 2009. He was called up to the Kenya national team in November 2012 for the 2012 CECAFA Cup.

Olum made his international debut in a 1–0 victory over Comoros in May 2014.
