= Nelson Field =

Stadium in Austin, Texas

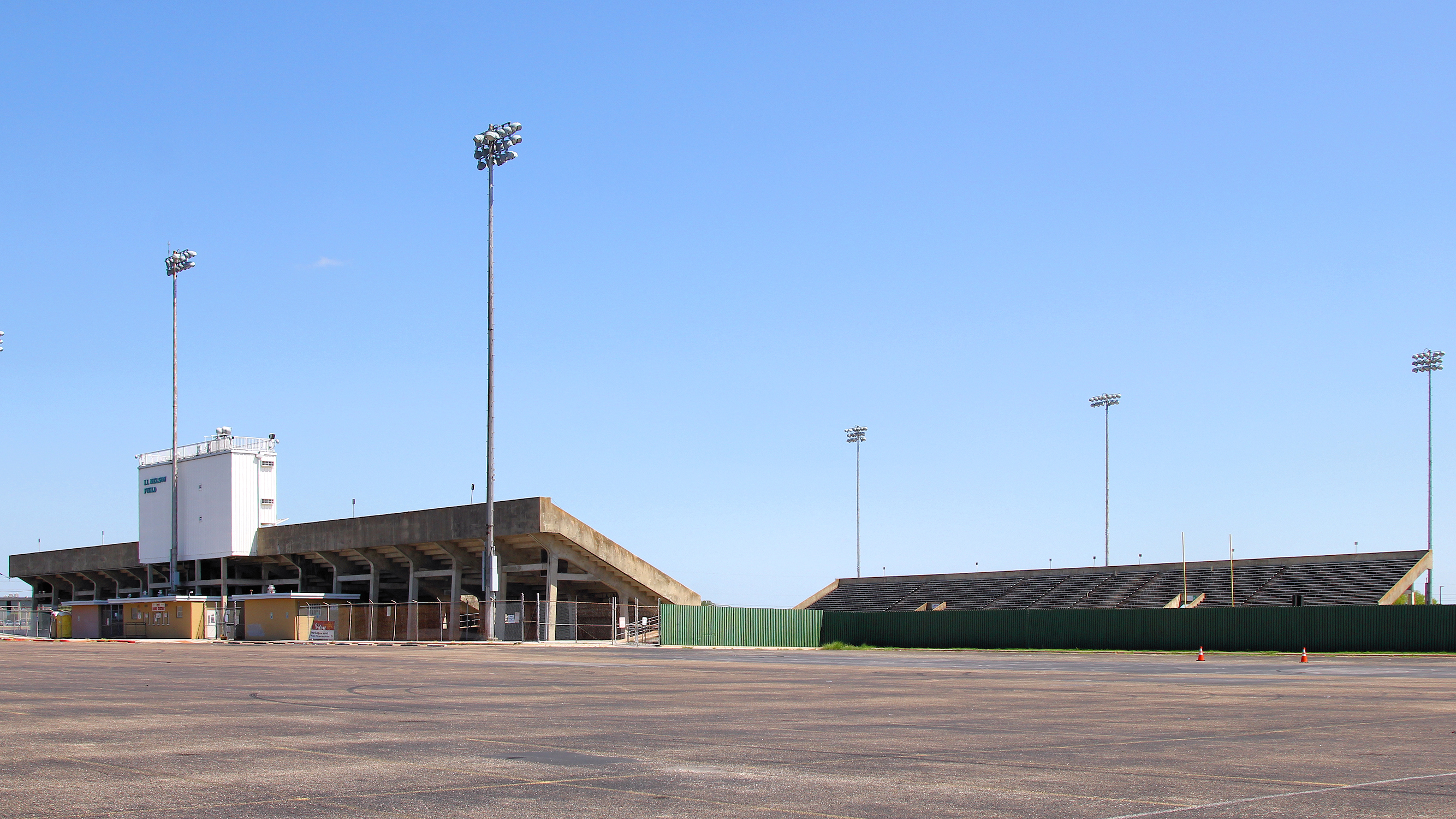
- Interactive map of Nelson Field
- Full name: Nelson Field
- Location: 7105 Berkman Drive, Austin, Texas
- Coordinates: 30.324348°N 97.688201°W
- Owner: Austin Independent School District
- Operator: Austin Independent School District
- Capacity: 8,800
- Surface: Artificial Turf

Construction
- Opened: 1965

Tenants
- Northeast, LBJ, Navarro, and Eastside

Nelson Field is a multi-use stadium in Austin, Texas, located on the north side of U.S. Route 290 at the junction with Berkman Drive. It serves as home stadium for LBJ High School, Navarro High School, Eastside High School and Northeast High School. The stadium's capacity is 8,800 spectators.

The stadium hosts football, baseball, and track and field events.
