= Maxwell Griffin =

American soccer player

Personal information
- Full name: Maxwell Ramon Griffin
- Date of birth: September 17, 1987 (age 39)
- Place of birth: Riverside, California, U.S.
- Height: 6 ft 1 in (1.85 m)
- Position: Forward

College career
Years	Team	Apps	(Gls)
2006–2009	UCLA Bruins		

Senior career*
Years	Team	Apps	(Gls)
2006	San Fernando Valley Quakes	9	(2)
2008	San Fernando Valley Quakes	7	(0)
2009	Los Angeles Legends	9	(1)
2010	Austin Aztex	29	(10)
2011–2012	Orlando City	30	(10)
2011	→ San Jose Earthquakes (loan)	4	(0)
2012	→ Los Angeles Blues (loan)	9	(4)
2013	Minnesota United FC	14	(1)
- * Club domestic league appearances and goals as of February 14, 2014

Maxwell Griffin (born September 17, 1987, in Riverside, California) is an American retired soccer player.

== Career ==
=== College and amateur ===
Griffin attended Littlerock High School and played college soccer at the UCLA from 2006 to 2009, where he racked up a litany of accolades, receiving a selection to the All-Pac-10 team, and an NSCAA All-Far West selection. He was also nominated for the prestigious Lowe's Senior CLASS Award, and as a senior led the team with four game-winning goals, moving him up to sixth in the all-time UCLA scoring record books. Griffin netted 28 goals overall in his career, increasing his total in each of the four seasons at the school and is one of just 18 players to have scored a hat trick for UCLA in its 43-year history.

During his college years Griffin also played with the San Fernando Valley Quakes and the Los Angeles Legends in the USL Premier Development League.

=== Professional ===
Upon graduating from UCLA, Griffin signed a one-year deal with the Austin Aztex FC of the USSF Division 2 on March 23, 2010.

He made his professional debut on April 11, 2010, in Austin's first game of the 2010 season, a 2–0 victory over Montreal Impact, scored his first professional goal on May 29 in a 2–0 win over Crystal Palace Baltimore, and scored a hat trick on June 19, 2010, in a 3–1 win over Miami FC.

Prior to the 2011 season, new owners purchased the club and moved it to Orlando, Florida, renaming it Orlando City. The club will play in the USL Pro league in 2011. At the end of the 2011 USL Pro season, Griffin moved on loan to San Jose Earthquakes. He last played for Minnesota United FC in the North American Soccer League.

=== Retirement ===
Griffin officially retired from professional soccer in April 2014. On his official Facebook page, Griffin stated "After 22 years of playing soccer and these last 4 playing professionally, I've decided to hang up the boots. It's sad to think that I won't be playing as a career anymore, but I am beyond excited to be starting the next chapter of my life at the adidas HQ in Portland. I have met so many amazing people and created lifelong friendships along the way. So thankful and blessed to have had the support of my friends and family throughout my life and career. Also a huge thank you to PROficient Agency for creating so many opportunities for me as a player and making this a very exciting journey."

== Personal ==
Maxwell is the younger brother of fellow professional soccer player Leonard Griffin.

Griffin has also dabbled in acting, and featured in JoJo's music video for her 2006 hit song "Too Little Too Late" alongside several of his UCLA Bruins teammates.

== Honors ==
=== Club ===
Orlando City

- USL Pro: 2011

=== Individual ===
- USSF D-2 Pro League Rookie of the Year: 2010
