= Kieron Bernard =

Jamaican footballer (born 1985)

Personal information
- Full name: Kieron Bernard
- Date of birth: 2 August 1985 (age 41)
- Place of birth: Spanish Town, Jamaica
- Height: 6 ft 2 in (1.88 m)
- Position: Defender

Youth career
- 2001–2004: Cooreville Gardens
- 2004–2007: Portmore United
- 2007–2008: San Jacinto Coyotes

Senior career*
Years	Team	Apps	(Gls)
2008	Austin Aztex U23	8	(0)
2009–2010	Austin Aztex	36	(1)
2011–2013	Orlando City	30	(2)

International career^{‡}
2001–2002	Jamaica U17		
2003–2005	Jamaica U20		
2007	Jamaica U23	5	(0)
- * Club domestic league appearances and goals as of 4 August 2012 ‡ National team caps and goals as of 24 April 2009

Kieron Bernard (born 2 August 1985) is a former Jamaican footballer last playing for Orlando City in the USL Professional Division.

== Career ==
=== Youth and amateur ===
Bernard attended Jonathan Grant High School in Jamaica where he was a multi-sport athlete, playing basketball and running track in addition to playing soccer. He briefly played for Cooreville Gardens as a youth and Portmore United in the Jamaica National Premier League before moving to the United States in August 2007 to attend San Jacinto College.

At San Jacinto Bernard established himself as an outstanding junior college soccer player; he was a 2007 second team NJCAA All American and, in 2008, helped San Jacinto to the semifinals of the NJCAA national championship. During the 2008 collegiate off season, Bernard also played for the Austin Aztex U23 in the Premier Development League.

=== Professional ===
Bernard turned professional on 15 December 2008, when he signed with the newly established Austin Aztex in the USL First Division. On 23 February 2010 Austin announced the re-signing of Bernard to a new two-year contract with the club. He scored his first professional goal on 25 September 2010 in a 4–2 win over AC St. Louis.

Prior to the 2011 season, new owners purchased the club and moved it to Orlando, Florida, renaming it Orlando City SC The club began play in the USL Pro league in 2011.

On 30 May 2013, Bernard announced his retirement from soccer.

=== International ===
Bernard has also played for the Jamaica U-17, U-20 and U-23 national teams.

== Honours ==
=== Orlando City ===
- USL Pro (1): 2011
