= Kevin Sakuda =

American soccer player (born 1980)

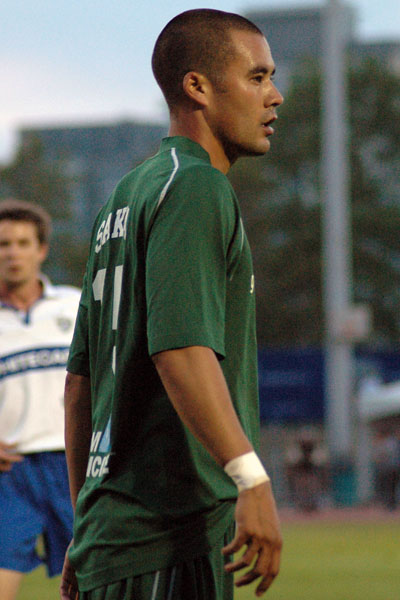

Personal information
- Full name: Kevin Sakuda
- Date of birth: June 18, 1980 (age 46)
- Place of birth: Fremont, California, United States
- Height: 6 ft 0 in (1.83 m)
- Position: Defender

College career
Years	Team	Apps	(Gls)
1998–2001	Duke Blue Devils		

Senior career*
Years	Team	Apps	(Gls)
2002	San Jose Earthquakes	0	(0)
2002–2005	San Diego Sockers (indoor)	70	(5)
2003–2008	Seattle Sounders	148	(5)
2008	Seattle Wolves (indoor)		
2009	Montreal Impact	13	(1)
2009–2010	Austin Aztex	40	(0)

International career^{‡}
1998	United States U20	1	(0)
- * Club domestic league appearances and goals as of August 8, 2012 ‡ National team caps and goals as of August 8, 2012

Kevin Sakuda (born June 18, 1980, in Fremont, California) is an American soccer player who last played for Austin Aztex in the USSF Division 2 Professional League.

== Career ==
=== Youth and college ===
Sakuda attended Mission San Jose High School. He then attended Duke University where he played three seasons on the men's soccer team from 1998 to 2001. During this time he was also a member of the United States U-20 men's national soccer team.

=== Professional ===
In February 2002, the San Jose Earthquakes picked Sakuda in the fourth round (thirty-ninth overall) in the 2002 MLS SuperDraft. He spent the 2002 season with the Earthquakes, but never entered a first team game and was released. In the fall of 2002, he then signed with the San Diego Sockers of Major Indoor Soccer League. He would play with the Sockers through the 2003–2004 season. In the 2004 MISL Expansion Draft, the Chicago Storm selected Sakuda, then traded him back to the Sockers on September 24, 2004, in exchange for Byron Alvarez. When the Sockers folded during the 2004–2005 season, the Storm picked him in third round of the Dispersal Draft, but Sakuda did not sign with the team.

During the 2003 outdoor season, Sakuda signed with the Seattle Sounders of the USL First Division. He quickly became a mainstay on their back line. He played twenty games his first season, a number which injury reduced to thirteen for the 2004 season. Those were the only seasons in which he saw time in less than 28 games. In 2005, Sakuda and his teammates won the USL First Division championship, a title they won again in 2007.

Sakuda has continued to play indoors since leaving the Sockers; during 2008 he was a member of the Seattle Wolves FC indoor team which competed in the Premier Arena Soccer League during the winter.

On February 27, 2009, he moved to the Montreal Impact on a free transfer, signing a two-year contract.

On July 15, 2009, he signed a contract for the remainder of the season with the Austin Aztex.

== Honors ==
=== Seattle Sounders ===
- USL First Division Championship (1): 2007
- USL First Division Commissioner's Cup (1): 2007
