= Wes Allen (soccer) =

American soccer player (born 1986)

Personal information
- Full name: Westley David Allen
- Date of birth: September 17, 1986 (age 40)
- Place of birth: Austin, Texas, United States
- Height: 6 ft 1 in (1.85 m)
- Positions: Defender; midfielder

Youth career
- 2003–2006: Oakland Golden Grizzlies

Senior career*
| Years | Team | Apps | (Gls) |
| 2008 | Austin Aztex U23 | 15 | (0) |
| 2009–2010 | Austin Aztex | 21 | (0) |
| 2011–2012 | Orlando City | 14 | (3) |
- * Club domestic league appearances and goals as of August 22, 2012

Westley David Allen (born September 17, 1986, in Austin, Texas) is an American soccer player.

== Career ==
=== Youth and amateur ===
Allen grew up in Austin, Texas, attended L. C. Anderson High School, and played college soccer at Oakland University, where he earned Third Team All-American Honors as a freshman.

Undrafted out of college, Allen played for the University of Texas club team, and played for Austin Aztex U23 in the USL Premier Development League in 2008.

=== Professional ===
Allen signed with Austin Aztex of the USL First Division for the 2009 season, and made his debut for the team on May 29, 2009, in a game against Puerto Rico Islanders. He was released by the Aztex at the end of the 2009 season, but re-signed prior to the 2010 season.

On March 11, 2011, Allen re-signed with the club, which had moved to Orlando, Florida after the 2010 season, renamed itself Orlando City, and aligned itself with the USL Pro league. The club signed Allen to a multi-year contract on September 1, 2011.

== Honors ==
=== Orlando City ===
- USL Pro (1): 2011
