= Yordany Álvarez =

Cuban footballer (born 1985)

Personal information
- Full name: Yordany Álvarez Oropeza
- Date of birth: 24 May 1985 (age 41)
- Place of birth: Cienfuegos, Cuba
- Height: 1.79 m (5 ft 10 in)
- Position: Midfielder

Senior career*
Years	Team	Apps	(Gls)
2006–2008	FC Cienfuegos		
2009–2010	Austin Aztex	40	(5)
2011	Orlando City	21	(2)
2011	→ Real Salt Lake (loan)	5	(0)
2012–2014	Real Salt Lake	33	(1)
2014	→ Orlando City (loan)	13	(1)
Total		112+	(9+)

International career
2006–2008	Cuba	8	(3)
- * Club domestic league appearances and goals

Yordany Álvarez Oropeza, also written as Yordanis Álvarez Oropesa, (born 24 May 1985) is a Cuban retired footballer.

== Club career ==
=== Cuba ===
Álvarez began his career in his native Cuba, playing with his hometown club FC Cienfuegos in the Campeonato Nacional de Fútbol de Cuba.

While playing for the Cuban U-23 national team in the Olympic qualifying tournament in Tampa, Florida in March 2008, Álvarez, along with several other members of the team, defected to the United States under the wet foot dry foot scheme that allows Cubans who reach U.S. soil to obtain asylum.

=== United States ===
Following an unsuccessful trial with Los Angeles Galaxy, Álvarez was signed to a professional contract by the USL First Division expansion franchise Austin Aztex after attending the Aztex open tryouts in California in March 2009. He made his debut for the team on 18 April 2009, in Austin's USL1 season opener against Minnesota Thunder. On 21 January 2010 renewed his contract by signing a three-year deal with the club. Prior to the 2011 season, new owners purchased the club and moved it to Orlando, Florida, renaming it Orlando City SC. The club played in the USL Pro league in 2011, winning the league championship with Álvarez being named league most valuable player.

At the end of the 2011 USL Pro season, Álvarez signed with Major League Soccer club Real Salt Lake on a loan agreement. In January 2012, Salt Lake exercised its option to purchase Álvarez and he signed a three-year contract in February 2012.

On 22 January 2014, it was announced that Álvarez was loaned back to Orlando City SC for the 2014 USL Pro season and the move would be made permanent in 2015 when the club began play in MLS. In exchange for Álvarez, Real Salt Lake acquired Orlando's 4th round pick in the 2017 MLS SuperDraft. This deal made Álvarez the second player ever signed to Orlando's MLS roster, second only to Kevin Molino. However on 29 August 2014, Álvarez was forced to retire after undergoing a series of tests for a medical condition he suffered during a match on 7 June against the Dayton Dutch Lions.

After retiring as a player, he became a coach of Orlando City's youth academy.

== International career ==
Álvarez played for the Cuba U-20s at the 2004 Copa de las Antillas and made his senior international debut for Cuba in a November 2006 CONCACAF Gold Cup qualification match against Surinam in which he immediately scored two goals and has earned a total of 8 caps, scoring 3 goals. His final international was a February 2008 friendly match against Guyana, a month prior to defecting to the United States.

== Personal ==
Álvarez received his U.S. green card in 2011.

== Honours ==
Orlando City

- USL Pro: 2011

Real Salt Lake

- Major League Soccer Western Conference Championship: 2013

Individual

- USL Pro MVP: 2011
