= Jamie Watson (soccer) =

American soccer player and match analyst

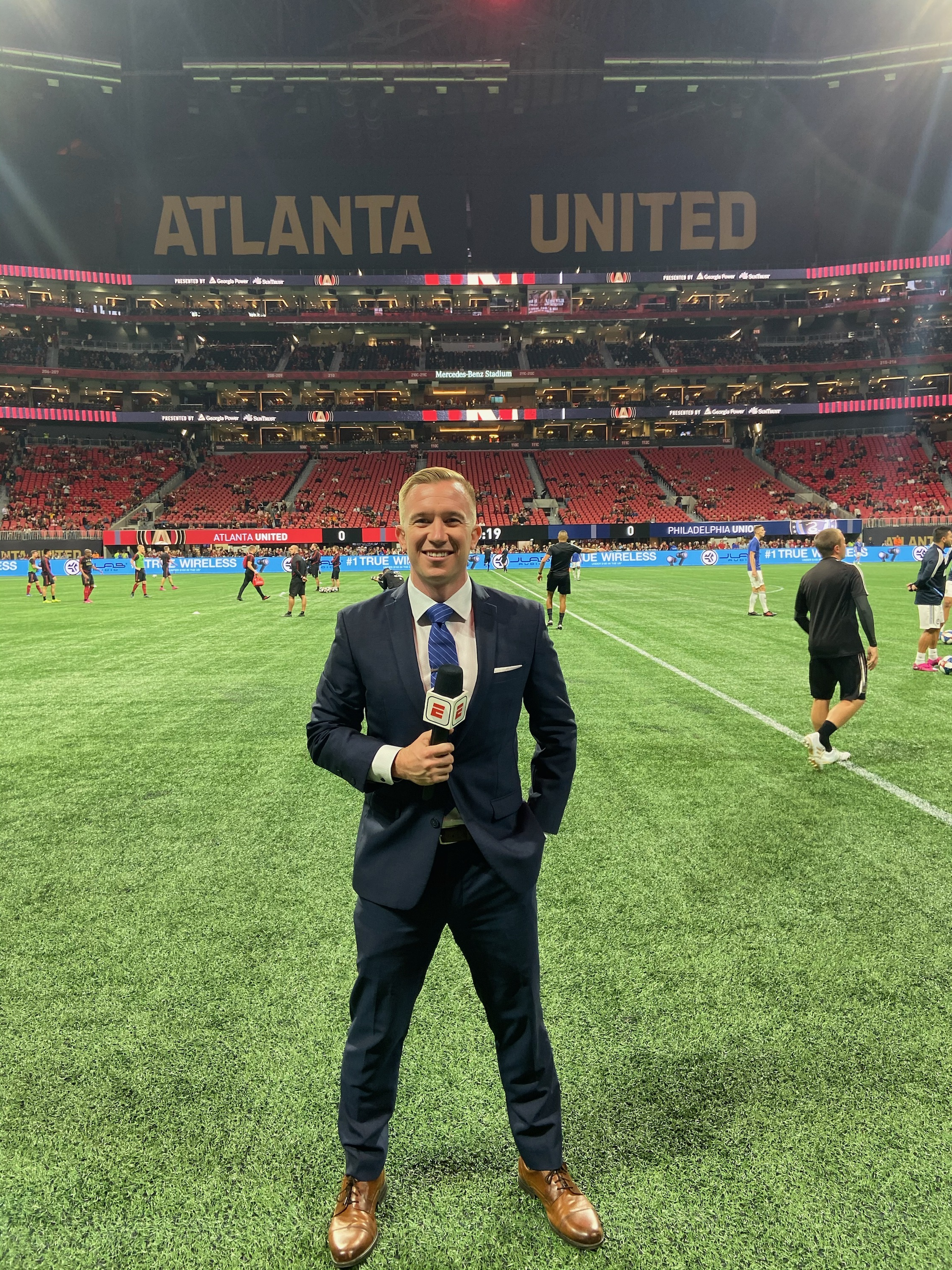

Personal information
- Date of birth: April 10, 1986 (age 40)
- Height: 5 ft 9 in (1.75 m)
- Position: Midfielder

Youth career
- 2001–2003: IMG Academy

College career
Years	Team	Apps	(Gls)
2003–2004	North Carolina Tar Heels		

Senior career*
Years	Team	Apps	(Gls)
2004	DFW Tornados	5	(3)
2005–2007	Real Salt Lake	38	(2)
2008	Austin Aztex U23	13	(7)
2008	FC Dallas	1	(0)
2009	Charleston Battery	1	(0)
2009	Wilmington Hammerheads	16	(12)
2009–2010	Austin Aztex	35	(10)
2011–2013	Orlando City	60	(23)
2012	→ Minnesota Stars FC (loan)	2	(1)
2014–2016	Minnesota United FC	31	(4)

International career^{‡}
2003	United States U17	25	(10)
- * Club domestic league appearances and goals as of October 9, 2016 ‡ National team caps and goals as of July 22, 2013

Jamie Watson (born April 10, 1986) is a former American soccer player and current match analyst with MLS Season Pass on Apple TV. Jamie was an analyst for Host Broadcast Service on the world feed for the 2026 FIFA Men's World Cup. Previously, he was an analyst for the 2025 FIFA Club World Cup on TNT Sports and DAZN.

== Career ==
=== College ===
Watson played two years of college soccer at University of North Carolina at Chapel Hill, but left after his sophomore season to sign a Generation Adidas contract with Major League Soccer. Watson scored 12 goals and had 10 assists in his 2 seasons at UNC. Watson earned the coveted ACC Rookie of the Year after a highly successful freshman year. He was also named to Top Drawer Soccer's All Freshman Team at the conclusion of the season. During his second season, Watson was named to the ACC All-Tournament team and was selected to the All ACC team.

=== Professional ===
Watson was selected in the first round (13th overall) in the 2005 MLS SuperDraft by Real Salt Lake, but was waived on January 22, 2008, after making 39 first-team appearances and scoring 2 goals with 1 assist. Watson became an instant fan favorite and was well known throughout the community for his contributions on and off the field. He served on the board of directions for Utah Heart to Home, which is the Utah equivalent to Home makeover. Along with Heart to Home, Watson was heavily involved with Gov. Jon M. Huntsman and the First Lady, Mary Kay Huntsman, in their efforts to raise awareness around Salt Lake City regarding several issues.

After helping Austin Aztex U23 of the USL Premier Development League reach the PDL playoffs for the first time over the summer of 2008, scoring 7 goals in 13 appearances, Watson signed with Major League Soccer's FC Dallas on August 1, 2008, but ultimately made just one first team appearance.

After being waived by FC Dallas at the end of the 2008 season, he signed with the Wilmington Hammerheads, and was loaned out for the opening game of the 2009 season to Charleston Battery in early 2009, and after playing one game, returned to the Hammerheads. Watson enjoyed his best season as a professional, being named to the USL2 All-League team, earning league player of the week, team of the week on several occasions, and eventually all leading up to earning league MVP honors, as well as the scoring title. After the conclusion of the Hammerheads season, Watson was signed to a two-year contract by the USL-1 team Austin Aztex, and played his first match with them on August 29, 2009.

His contract with the Aztex was extended to two years in February 2010. Prior to the 2011 season, the club moved to Orlando, Florida, renaming it Orlando City SC. In the team's 2011 season, he was plagued by injuries in the first half, including a knee injury in the preseason, but scored 8 goals in 19 appearances, including a hat trick on August 12 against Harrisburg City Islanders. After the season, he tried out with MLS expansion team Montreal Impact, but ultimately re-signed a new multi-year contract with Orlando City. In 2014 Watson was signed by Minnesota United FC.

Watson is one of the few players in American soccer history to score in all four divisions of U.S. soccer.

After scoring with the Minnesota Stars in 2012 while on loan, that tally now brings the total number of professional leagues Jamie has scored in to 6. (MLS, USL-2, USL-1, USSF D-2, USLPRO, NASL)

=== International ===
Watson has played for various youth United States national teams, trained with the United States Under-17 team at the Bradenton Academy as a teenager, and was a starting forward at the 2003 FIFA U-17 World Championship in Lahti, Finland, playing alongside Freddy Adu. Watson scored a goal and contributed an assist in the opening fixture of the tournament against South Korea, while in the following match against Sierra Leone he assisted on Adu's game-winning goal. He finished the tournament with a team high 2 assists and 1 goal.

Watson has scored over 50 goals at youth level and has 10 international goals in youth international matches. His highest level reached at youth national team was representing the Under-23 Men's National Team in a tour of Kunnamoto, Japan against the Japan U-23 Olympic squad.

== Honors ==
=== Wilmington Hammerheads ===
- USL Second Division Regular Season Champions (1): 2009

=== Orlando City ===
- USL Pro Regular Season Champions (1): 2011
- USL Pro Playoff Champions (1): 2011

=== Minnesota Stars FC ===
- NASL Finalist (1): 2012

=== Individual ===
- USSF D-2 Pro League League MVP season 2009
- USSF D-2 Pro League Best XI (1): 2010
- USL Pro First Team All-League (1): 2013
