= Austin Aztex FC =

Austin Aztex
- Full name: Austin Aztex FC
- Nickname(s): Aztex, The RAW
- Founded: 2008
- Dissolved: 2010 (moved to Orlando)
- Stadium: House Park; Austin, Texas
- Capacity: 6,500
- Owner: Phil Rawlins
- Head Coach: Adrian Heath
- League: USSF Division 2 Professional League
- 2010: Regular season: 2nd, USL; Overall: 2nd Playoffs: quarterfinals
| Home colors | Away colors |

Austin Aztex FC was an American professional soccer team based in Austin, Texas, United States. Founded in 2008, the team played in the USL First Division and in the USL Division of the USSF D2 Pro League, the second tier of the American Soccer Pyramid. In October 2010, the Aztex were relocated to Orlando, Florida and became Orlando City after Orlando USL's rights were purchased by Phil Rawlins. The team was resurrected in 2011 by minority owner David Markley as the Austin Aztex, which began play in the USL Premier Development League in 2012 and moved to the United Soccer League in 2014.

The team played its home games at Nelson Field and House Park in Austin. The team's colors were red and white. Their head coach was an Englishman and former Everton midfielder, Adrian Heath.

== History ==
English-born Austin businessman Phil Rawlins owned the club. Originally from the UK, Rawlins served on the board of English Premier League club Stoke City. Austin and Stoke had a formal partnership, which included sharing training information and players, with Austin acting as a potential player resource for Stoke.

Immediately after announcing their intention to join USL1, the Aztex purchased the 2008 USL PDL expansion side Austin Stampede and rebranded it as Austin Aztex U23. Wolfgang Suhnholz was named coach of the U23 team, which commenced play in 2008.

On August 8, 2008, the Aztex announced the 2008 PDL Goalkeeper of the Year and former Austin Aztex U23 player, Miguel Gallardo, as their first professional signing for the 2009 season. Gallardo was signed with the team through 2011.

The Aztex began their inaugural season as a professional team by playing 4 MLS teams in preseason exhibition matches. The first three games were held in Austin at Nelson Field, while the fourth MLS match was in Rio Tinto Stadium on the MLS opening weekend. A fifth exhibition match was scheduled against the CONCACAF semi-finalist Puerto Rico Islanders in between their home and away series against Cruz Azul.

On May 19, 2010, Austin played the Tampa Bay Rowdies in front of 6,051 fans, their largest home crowd in franchise history.

On October 22, 2010, an article was published indicating that the team was likely to move to Orlando, Florida, for the 2011 season. This was confirmed on October 25, as the team became Orlando City SC.

== Players ==
=== Final roster ===
Note: Flags indicate national team as defined under FIFA eligibility rules; some limited exceptions apply. Players may hold more than one non-FIFA nationality.

| No. | Pos. | Nation | Player |
|---|---|---|---|
| 1 | GK | MEX | Miguel Gallardo |
| 2 | DF | HAI | Mechack Jérôme |
| 3 | DF | USA | Wes Allen |
| 4 | MF | USA | Ian Fuller |
| 5 | DF | JAM | Kieron Bernard |
| 6 | DF | USA | Lance Watson |
| 10 | MF | CUB | Yordany Álvarez |
| 11 | FW | USA | Maxwell Griffin |
| 12 | DF | USA | Leonard Griffin |
| 13 | MF | KEN | Lawrence Olum |
| 15 | DF | USA | Kevin Sakuda |

| No. | Pos. | Nation | Player |
|---|---|---|---|
| 16 | MF | USA | Michael Callahan |
| 18 | DF | USA | Joey Worthen |
| 20 | FW | TRI | Randi Patterson |
| 21 | GK | USA | Sean Kelley |
| 23 | FW | USA | Kendell McFayden |
| 24 | MF | CAN | Tyler Hemming |
| 25 | DF | USA | Sam Brill |
| 33 | DF | USA | Jay Needham |
| 61 | MF | TRI | Stephan Campbell |
| 77 | FW | USA | Jamie Watson |

=== Staff ===
- (England) Adrian Heath – Head Coach
- (United States) Bobby Murphy – Assistant Coach
- (United States) David Winner – Goalkeeping Coach
- (United States) Shermin Patel – Athletic Trainer

== Year-by-year ==
| Year | Division | League | Regular season | Playoffs | Open Cup | Avg. attendance |
|---|---|---|---|---|---|---|
| 2009 | 2 | USL First Division | 10th | Did not qualify | 3rd Round | 2,974 |
| 2010 | 2 | USSF D-2 Pro League | 2nd, USL (3rd) | Quarterfinals | 3rd Round | 3,733 |

== Head coaches ==
- (England) Adrian Heath (2009–2010)

== Stadiums ==
- Nelson Field; Austin, Texas (2009)
- House Park; Austin, Texas (2010)

== See also ==
- Austin Aztex U23
- Austin Lightning
- Austin Aztex (2012–)
