= Miguel Gallardo (footballer) =

Mexican footballer (born 1984)

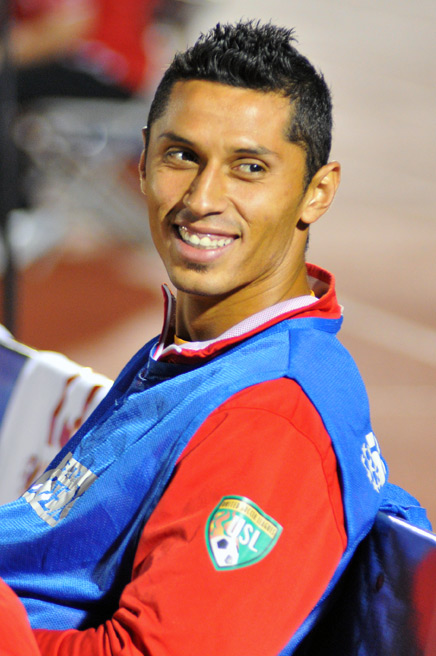

Personal information
- Full name: Miguel Gallardo Aparicio
- Date of birth: October 24, 1984 (age 42)
- Place of birth: Torreón, Mexico
- Height: 6 ft 1 in (1.85 m)
- Position: Goalkeeper

Youth career
- 2000–2002: Tigres

Senior career*
Years	Team	Apps	(Gls)
2003–2007	Austin Lightning	64	(0)
2008	Austin Aztex U23	13	(0)
2009–2010	Austin Aztex	43	(0)
2011–2014	Orlando City	81	(0)
2015–2016	Jacksonville Armada	15	(0)
2017–2018	Florida Tropics SC (indoor)	3	(0)
- * Club domestic league appearances and goals as of 24 January 2019

Miguel Gallardo Aparicio (born October 24, 1984) is a Mexican former professional footballer who is currently a television analyst for Orlando City SC.

== Career ==
=== Youth and amateur ===
Gallardo grew up in Round Rock, Texas, and attended Westwood High School. He played club soccer for the Longhorn Soccer Club and Austin Capitals Soccer Club. Instead of attending college, Gallardo returned to his native Mexico to train with the youth academy at Tigres of the Primera División de México.

Finding opportunities in Mexico limited, Gallardo returned to the United States in 2002, subsequently playing in the USL Premier Development League for Austin Lightning. He made 64 starts in his five years with Lightning, before moving on to the Aztex junior team, Austin Aztex U23 in 2008, where he was named PDL Goalkeeper of the Year.

=== Professional ===
Gallardo was the first player signed by the USL First Division expansion franchise Austin Aztex. He made his professional debut on April 18, 2009, in Austin's USL1 season opener against Minnesota Thunder. Prior to the 2011 season, new owners purchased the club, moved it to Orlando, Florida, renamed it Orlando City and joined the USL Pro league for 2011.

Orlando City signed Gallardo to a multi-year contract on 1 September 2011. He was released upon the conclusion of the 2014 season, a casualty of the club's transition to Major League Soccer.

Gallardo signed with NASL expansion club Jacksonville Armada on 21 October 2014, becoming the first player on the team's roster.

Miguel Gallardo was released from the Jacksonville Armada on 14 December 2016.

On February 17, 2017, Gallardo resigned with Orlando City SC of the MLS as a member of the broadcasting team.

Gallardo returned to playing professionally on July 28, 2017, by signing with Florida Tropics SC of the Major Arena Soccer League.

== Honours ==
Orlando City

- USL Cup: 2011, 2013
