= Austin Aztex U23 =

- Full name: Austin Aztex U23 Football Club
- Nickname: Aztex
- Founded: 2007
- Dissolved: 2009
- Ground: Dragon Stadium
- Capacity: 8,800
- Owner, Head Coach: (England) Phil Rawlins
- Manager: (Germany) Wolfgang Suhnholz
- League: USL Premier Development League
- 2009: 3rd, Mid South; Playoff Divisional Semifinals
Home colors	Away colors

Austin Aztex U23 was an American soccer team based in Round Rock, Texas, United States. Founded in 2007, the team played in the USL Premier Development League (PDL), the fourth tier of the American Soccer Pyramid, until 2009, after which the franchise folded and the team left the league.

The team played its home games in Dragon Stadium on the campus of Round Rock High School. The team's colors were red and white.

The team was part of the official development system of the Austin Aztex USL First Division franchise, which also has an affiliation with English Premier League club Stoke City.

== History ==
The Aztex originally joined the PDL as a 2008 expansion franchise, and were initially named Austin Stampede, but were re-branded after their controlling shares were bought by Austin Football Holdings LLC, (AFH). The team made its professional debut on 3 May 2008 in a 0–0 tie away to El Paso Patriots, and picked up its first victory in the next game, 2–0 at home to Houston Leones off goals by A. J. Godbolt and Robin Martinez. The Aztex enjoyed an auspicious beginning to their debut season, winning six of their next seven games, including a 4–0 thrashing of DFW Tornados that features a hat-trick from striker Andres Cuero. The team's positive early season form also saw them qualify for the Lamar Hunt U.S. Open Cup at the first time of asking, where they managed to hold USL1 side Atlanta Silverbacks to a 2–2 tie before ultimately 5–4 in a penalty shoot-out; Jamie Watson and Willy Guadarrama scored Austin's goals. Austin's impressive form continued through June and early July with three more home victories, but in the final games of the regular the team stuttered, losing three on the bounce, including a 1–3 turnaround to El Paso Patriots, their worst defeat of the season. Nevertheless, the team's early and mid-season consistency kept them at the top of the Mid South Division, finishing the season as champions, three points ahead of second place Laredo Heat, and into the Southern Conference playoffs. A 2–1 victory over Southeast Division runners-up Bradenton Academics put the Aztex into the Conference final, where they were overrun by a resurgent Laredo Heat who, despite having been beaten twice by the Aztex during the regular season, put them away with a 3–1 scoreline. Also in 2008, the Aztex played an exhibition match at home against the popular Mexican team Tigrés, coming away on the wrong end of a respectable 2–1 scoreline. Jamie Watson and Andres Cuero were the Aztex's top scorers, with 7 and 5 goals respectively, and Watson topped the assists sheet too, with three to his name. Miguel Gallardo enjoyed the best goalkeeping statistics in the PDL, with a goals-against average of 0.615 per game, and keeping 9 clean sheets in his 13 games.

== Year-by-year ==
Year	Division	League	Regular season	Playoffs	Open Cup
2008	4	USL PDL	1st, Mid South	Conference Finals	1st Round
2009	4	USL PDL	3rd, Mid South	Divisional Semifinals	Did not qualify

== Honors ==
- USL PDL
  - Mid South Division Champions: 2008

== Head coaches ==
- (Germany) Wolfgang Suhnholz (2008–2009)

== Stadia ==
- Dragon Stadium; Round Rock, Texas (2008–2009)
- Betty Lou Mays Soccer Field; Waco, Texas 1 game (2009)
- Stadium at Bastrop High School; Bastrop, Texas 1 game (2009)
- Bobcat Soccer Complex; San Marcos, Texas 1 game (2009)

== Average attendance ==
Attendance stats are calculated by averaging each team's self-reported home attendances from the historical match https://web.archive.org/web/20100105175057/http://www.uslsoccer.com/history/index_E.html

- 2008: 1,166 (7th in PDL)
- 2009: 232 (46th in PDL)

== See also ==
- Austin Lightning
- Austin Aztex FC
