= 2013 Phoenix FC season =

Phoenix FC
2013 season
- Owners: (United States) Eric Cornwell (Portugal) Rui Filipe Bento (United States) Shawn Diedtrich (Scotland) David Robertson
- Manager: (Scotland) David Robertson
- Stadium: Sun Devil Soccer Stadium
- USL Pro: 12th Place
- USL Pro Playoffs: Did not qualify
- U.S. Open Cup: 1st round
- Top goalscorer: Donny Toia (6)
- Highest home attendance: 4,198 vs VSI Tampa Bay FC (March 30)
- Lowest home attendance: 327 vs Harrisburg City Islanders (July 31)
- Average home league attendance: 1,532
Home colors	Away colors

The 2013 Phoenix FC season was the club's only season of existence, playing in the USL Professional Division.

== USL Pro ==
All times from this point on Mountain Standard Time (UTC−07:00)

=== Results summary ===
Overall								Home						Away					
Pld	W	D	L	GF	GA	GD	Pts	W	D	L	GF	GA	GD	W	D	L	GF	GA	GD
26	5	7	14	28	41	−13	22	4	5	5	17	20	−3	1	2	9	11	21	−10

Source: Match reports

Round	1	2	3	4	5	6	7	8	9	10	11	12	13	14	15	16	17	18	19	20	21	22	23	24	25	26
Stadium	A	H	H	H	A	H	H	A	A	H	A	A	A	A	H	H	A	A	H	H	H	A	A	H	H	H
Result	L	W	L	L	D	W	D	L	L	D	L	L	L	L	D	D	L	D	W	W	D	L	W	L	L	L

Updated to match(es) played on August 16, 2013. Source: Match reports
A = Away; H = Home; W = Win; D = Draw; L = Loss

=== League results ===
March 23, 2013 1	Los Angeles Blues	2–0	Phoenix FC	Fullerton, California
7:30pm	Davis IV 25'; Cortez 49'; Hall (yellow card) 60'; Stanley (yellow card) 89'	Report; Report	Bowen (yellow card) 38'; Obodai (red card) 40'	Stadium: Titan Stadium, Cal State-Fullerton; Attendance: 1,436; Referee: Jesus Cisneros

March 30, 2013 2	Phoenix FC	1–0	VSI Tampa Bay FC	Tempe, Arizona
7:30pm	Netinho 15'; Morrison (yellow card) 90'	Report; Report	Hoffer (yellow card) 47'	Stadium: Sun Devil Soccer Stadium, Arizona State University; Attendance: 4,198; Referee: Juan Guzman

April 7, 2013 3	Phoenix FC	1–3	Orlando City	Tempe, Arizona
7:30pm	A Weber (yellow card) 7'; Faria 16'; Hedrick (yellow card) 18'; Boufleur (yellow card) 55'	Report; Report	Dwyer 35'; Tan 68'; Molino 87'	Stadium: Sun Devil Soccer Stadium, Arizona State University; Attendance: 2,329; Referee: Daniel Radford

April 14, 2013 4	Phoenix FC	1–3	Los Angeles Blues	Tempe, Arizona
6:00pm	Morrison 68' (yellow card) 74'; Vickers (yellow card) 73'	Report; Report	Pizarro 7'; Miller 15'; Spitz (yellow card) 74'; Valle-Ortiz 77'	Stadium: Sun Devil Soccer Stadium, Arizona State University; Attendance: 1,867; Referee: Ioannis Stavridis

April 22, 2013 5	Real Salt Lake Reserves	0–0	Phoenix FC	Sandy, Utah
6:00pm	Watson-Siriboe (red card) 45+'	Report; Report	Bowen (yellow card) 44'; A Weber (red card) 45+'; Boufleur (red card) 45+'; Faria (yellow card) 81'	Stadium: Rio Tinto Stadium; Attendance: 8,263; Referee: Tyler Ploeger

April 28, 2013 6	Phoenix FC	3–1	Wilmington Hammerheads	Tempe, Arizona
7:30pm	Bentick 6' (o.g.); Netinho (yellow card) 8' (goal) 34'; Toia (yellow card) 50'; Faria 83'; Bowen (yellow card) 89'; Hedrick (yellow card) 90'	Report; Report	Wallace 40' (yellow card) 54'; Nicklaw (red card) 60'; Daly (yellow card) 81'; Davidson (yellow card) 90'	Stadium: Sun Devil Soccer Stadium, Arizona State University; Attendance: 1,427; Referee: Paul Nothman

May 3, 2013 7	Phoenix FC	1–1	Pittsburgh Riverhounds	Tempe, Arizona
7:30pm	Toia 11'; Hedrick (yellow card) 73'	Report; Report	Marshall 79'	Stadium: Sun Devil Soccer Stadium, Arizona State University; Attendance: 2,107; Referee: Tyler Ploeger

May 9, 2013 8	Pittsburgh Riverhounds	2–1	Phoenix FC	Pittsburgh, Pennsylvania
4:00pm	Angulo 22' 51'; Kerr (yellow card) 27'; Seth (yellow card) 79'; Costanzo (yellow card) 90+'	Report	Obodai (yellow card) 79'; King 90'; Bowen (red card) 90+'	Stadium: Highmark Stadium; Referee: Charles Murphy

May 11, 2013 9	Dayton Dutch Lions	4–3	Phoenix FC	Dayton, Ohio
4:30pm	DeLass 18' 77' (pen.); Harada (yellow card) 30'; Bardsley (yellow card) 35' (goal) 45' 48'	Report; Report	T Ramos 6'; Obodai (yellow card) 15'; J Ramos (yellow card) 18'; King 79'; Doue 80'; T Ramos (yellow card) 90'	Stadium: Miami Valley Middle School Stadium; Referee: Josh Brooks

May 23, 2013 10	Phoenix FC	2–2	Charlotte Eagles	Tempe, Arizona
7:30pm	Morrison 17'; Toia 38'; Grousis (yellow card) 79'	Report; Report	Ramirez 5'; Villaseñor 35'	Stadium: Sun Devil Soccer Stadium, Arizona State University; Attendance: 1,903; Referee: Juan Colazo

May 31, 2013 11	Richmond Kickers	1–0	Phoenix FC	Richmond, Virginia
4:00pm	Robinson 30'; Arbelaez (yellow card) 58'; Seaton (yellow card) 83'	Report; Report	Morrison (yellow card) 87'	Stadium: City Stadium; Attendance: 1,694; Referee: Ben Hichak

June 1, 2013 12	Wilmington Hammerheads	2–1	Phoenix FC	Wilmington, North Carolina
4:30pm	Wallace 6'; Elenio (yellow card) 20'; Evans (yellow card) 49'; Roberts 45' (yellow card) 50'; Steres (yellow card) 68'; Nicklaw (yellow card) 74'; Daly (yellow card) 90'	Report; Report	Toia 41' (yellow card) 85'; Morrison (yellow card) 62'	Stadium: Legion Stadium; Attendance: 2,752; Referee: Abbes Mansour-Hafifi

June 7, 2013 13	Orlando City	2–0	Phoenix FC	Orlando, Florida
4:30pm	Watson 27' (pen.); Dwyer 31'		Grousis (yellow card) 43'; Schafer (yellow card) 80'	Stadium: Citrus Bowl; Attendance: 7,466; Referee: Cedric Adams

June 9, 2013 14	VSI Tampa Bay FC	1–0	Phoenix FC	Plant City, Florida
4:00pm	Joel Harrison (Coach) (red card) 35'; Horwath (red card) 64'; Burt 73'	Report; Report	Obodai (yellow card) 33'; Boufleur (yellow card) 54'; T Ramos (yellow card) 87'	Stadium: Plant City Stadium; Referee: Mike Miscannon

June 15, 2013 15	Phoenix FC	0–0	Real Salt Lake Reserves	Tempe, Arizona
7:30pm	Morrison (yellow card) 58'	Report; Report	Grossman (yellow card) 46'; Martinez (yellow card) 73'; Alvarez (yellow card) 80'	Stadium: Sun Devil Soccer Stadium, Arizona State University; Attendance: 2,386; Referee: Kevin Stott

June 21, 2013 16	Phoenix FC	0–0	Dayton Dutch Lions	Tempe, Arizona
7:30pm	Morrison (yellow card) 32'	Report; Report	Smith (yellow card) 24'; Harada (yellow card) 38'; Garner (yellow card) 75'	Stadium: Sun Devil Soccer Stadium, Arizona State University; Attendance: 1,453; Referee: Charles Farr

June 28, 2013 17	Harrisburg City Islanders	2–1	Phoenix FC	Harrisburg, Pennsylvania
4:00pm	Ekra 14' (yellow card) 90'; Ribeiro (yellow card) 44'; Pelletier (yellow card) 52'; Touray (yellow card) 72' (goal) 73'; Mellor (yellow card) 89'	Report	Schafer 36' (yellow card) 78'; Toia (yellow card) 75'; Bento (yellow card) 90'	Stadium: Skyline Sports Complex; Attendance: 1,179; Referee: Michael Donovan

June 29, 2013 18	Rochester Rhinos	0–0	Phoenix FC	Rochester, New York
4:05pm	Brettschneider (yellow card) 29'	Report; Report		Stadium: Sahlen's Stadium; Attendance: 7,334; Referee: Alex Chilowicz

July 6, 2013 19	Phoenix FC	1–0	Antigua Barracuda	Tempe, Arizona
7:30pm	Faria 33'; T Ramos (yellow card) 59'; Hedrick (yellow card) 68'	Report; Report	T Robinson (yellow card) 22'	Stadium: Sun Devil Soccer Stadium, Arizona State University; Attendance: 984; Referee: Ramy Touchan

July 11, 2013 20	Phoenix FC	1–0	Antigua Barracuda	Phoenix, Arizona
7:30pm	Hedrick (yellow card) 15'; Obodai (yellow card) 37'; Toia (yellow card) 37'; T Ramos 90+'	Report; Report	Kirwan (yellow card) 76'; Philip (yellow card) 90'	Stadium: GCU Soccer Stadium, Grand Canyon University; Attendance: 443; Referee: Alex Moniscal

July 19, 2013 21	Phoenix FC	2–2	Richmond Kickers	Tempe, Arizona
7:30pm	Schafer (yellow card) 22'; T Ramos 23' 45'; Vickers (yellow card) 66'	Report; Report	William 67'; Davies (yellow card) 75'; Johnson 90'	Stadium: Sun Devil Soccer Stadium, Arizona State University; Attendance: 1,097; Referee: Jesus Cisneros

July 24, 2013 22	Charleston Battery	5–1	Phoenix FC	Charleston, South Carolina
4:30pm	Falvey 30'; Kelly 59' 64'; Morrison 78' (o.g.); Sanyang 88'	Report; Report	Morrison 71'	Stadium: Blackbaud Stadium; Attendance: 2,786; Referee: Howard Ash

July 27, 2013 23	Charlotte Eagles	0–4	Phoenix FC	Charlotte, North Carolina
4:00pm	Yates (yellow card) 36'; Reid (yellow card) 89'	Report; Report	Paul 18' 32'; Toia 24'; Hedrick (yellow card) 75'; Vickers 83'	Stadium: Queens University Stadium; Attendance: 514; Referee: Chris Spivey

July 31, 2013 24	Phoenix FC	1–3	Harrisburg City Islanders	Phoenix, Arizona
7:30pm	Toia 49'; Morrison (yellow card) 75'	Report; Report	Bahner 24' (yellow card) 60'; Mkosana 66'; Andrews (yellow card) 72'; Hardware 90'	Stadium: Field #1, Reach 11 Sports Complex; Attendance: 327; Referee: Paul Nothman

August 10, 2013 25	Phoenix FC	0–1	Charleston Battery	Phoenix, Arizona
4:30pm		Report; Report	Mackie 11' (o.g.) vanSchaik (yellow card) 61'; Kelly (yellow card) 90'	Stadium: Field #1, Reach 11 Sports Complex; Attendance: 420; Referee: Charles Farr

August 16, 2013 26	Phoenix FC	3–4	Rochester Rhinos	Phoenix, Arizona
7:30pm	Toia 3' (yellow card) 80'; Bowen 21'; T Ramos (red card) 45'; Bento 90+'	Report; Report	Miller (yellow card) 16'; Earls 32'; Brettschneider 58'; Polak (yellow card) 60'; McManus 63' 90+'	Stadium: Field #1, Reach 11 Sports Complex; Attendance: 513; Referee: Tyler Ploeger

=== Standings ===
Pos	Team	Pld	W	T	L	GF	GA	GD	Pts
9	Wilmington Hammerheads	26	11	4	11	35	39	−4	36 (Note: Wilmington were deducted one point for fielding an ineligible player on July 21 against Pittsburgh.)
10	VSI Tampa Bay	26	9	5	12	41	39	+2	32
11	Rochester Rhinos	26	6	10	10	25	39	−14	28
12	Phoenix FC	26	5	7	14	28	41	−13	22
13	Antigua Barracuda	26	0	0	26	11	91	−80	0

Source: USL Pro official standings
Rules for classification: 1) points; 2) goal difference; 3) number of goals scored.

== U.S. Open Cup ==
May 14, 2013 First round	FC Tucson	2–1	Phoenix FC	Tucson, Arizona
7:30pm	Robinson (yellow card) 24'; Galbraith-Knapp (yellow card) 79'; Bevans 82' 90+'	Report; Report	Bowen (yellow card) 13'; Netinho (yellow card) 28'; King (yellow card) 57'; Hedrick (yellow card) 61'; Faria 63'; Obodai (yellow card) 71'	Stadium: North Field #5; Kino Sports Complex; Attendance: 910; Referee: Ramy Touchan

== Statistics ==
(Regular Season)

#	Pos.	Name	GP	GS	Min.	Goals	Assists	A yellow rectangle, denoting the yellow penalty card shown to a player being cautioned	A red rectangle, denoting the red penalty card shown to a player being sent off
25	FW	(United States) Donny Toia	24	0	2,159	6	2	5	0
18	MF	(United States) Thomas Ramos	17	0	900	4	0	3	1
3	DF	(Scotland) Scott Morrison	25	0	2,250	3	2	7	0
9	MF	(Brazil) Diego Faria	16	0	1,147	3	1	1	0
8	MF	(Brazil) Netinho	24	0	2,072	2	0	1	0
14	FW	(United States) Aaron King	14	0	808	2	1	0	0
7	MF	(United States) David Paul	5	0	368	2	1	0	0
16	DF	(United States) Isaiah Schafer	15	0	1,179	1	1	3	0
27	FW	(United States) Travis Bowen	15	0	999	1	0	3	1
23	FW	(United States) Peabo Doue	16	0	683	1	0	0	0
22	MF	(United States) Cameron Vickers	13	0	286	1	2	2	0
21	MF	(United States) Josh Bento	9	0	278	1	0	1	0
11	DF	(Cameroon) Cyprian Hedrick	24	0	2,160	0	0	6	0
6	MF	(Ghana) Anthony Obodai	24	0	2,051	0	1	3	1
4	DF	(United States) Devon Grousis	21	0	1,817	0	0	2	0
5	DF	(Brazil) Renan Boufleur	15	0	1,289	0	0	2	1
10	FW	(Scotland) Darren Mackie	12	0	748	0	0	0	0
15	DF	(Mexico) José Ramos	9	0	484	0	1	0	0
17	DF	(United States) Brian Holmes	9	0	269	0	0	0	0
19	DF	(United States) Elliot Weber	3	0	120	0	0	0	0
28	FW	(United States) Davy Armstrong	2	0	109	0	0	0	0
29	FW	(United States) Roberto Valadez	10	0	20	0	0	0	0

=== Goalkeepers ===
#	Name	GP	GS	Min.	SV	GA	GAA	SO	A yellow rectangle, denoting the yellow penalty card shown to a player being cautioned	A red rectangle, denoting the red penalty card shown to a player being sent off
1	(United States) Andrew Weber	14	0	1,215	41	20	1.215	3	1	1
13	(Jamaica) Sheldon Parkinson	8	0	538	14	6	1.003	1	0	0
20	(United States) Neal Kitson	6	0	485	28	15	2.783	1	0	0
0	(Mexico) Lalo Fernández	1	0	90	2	0	0.000	1	0	0
26	(United States) Humberto Soriano	1	0	12	0	0	0.000	0	0	0

== Transfers ==
=== Loan in ===
No.	Position	Nation	Player
0	GK	MEX	Lalo Fernández (On loan from Real Salt Lake)
28	FW	USA	Davy Armstrong (On loan from Colorado Rapids)
—	FW	USA	Will Bates (On loan from Seattle Sounders FC)

=== Loan out ===
No.	Position	Nation	Player
1	GK	USA	Andrew Weber (On loan to Seattle Sounders FC)
5	DF	BRA	Renan Boufleur (On loan to Orlando City SC)

== See also ==
- 2013 in American soccer
- 2013 USL Pro season
- Phoenix FC
