= 2011 Los Angeles Blues season =

Los Angeles Blues
2011 season
- Owners: (United States) Ali Mansouri (United States) Maryam Mansouri
- Head coach: (United States) Charlie Naimo
- Stadium: Titan Stadium
- USL Professional Division: Division: 3rd Overall: 7th
- USL Pro Playoffs: Divisional Semifinals
- U.S. Open Cup: Third Round
- Top goalscorer: League: Cesar Rivera (6); All: Cesar Rivera (7)
- Highest home attendance: USL Pro: 704 vs Dayton 15 July 2011; USOC: 3,627 vs LA Galaxy 28 June 2011
- Lowest home attendance: 144 vs Antigua 7 August 2011
- Average home league attendance: 382
Home colors	Away colors

The 2011 Los Angeles Blues season was the inaugural season of the club. For the 2011 season, the Blues played in the USL Pro, the third tier of the United States soccer pyramid. This season marked the first time in the modern era of American soccer that three professional soccer clubs play in the Greater Los Angeles metropolitan area.

== Match results ==
Lists of matches, featuring result, attendance (where available) and scorers, grouped by competition (league, cup, other competition). Do not include friendly matches.

=== Legend ===
Win	Tie	Loss

=== USL Pro ===
April 15, 2011 1	Sevilla FC Puerto Rico	0–3	Los Angeles Blues	Juncos, Puerto Rico
17:00 PST	Velez (yellow card) 25'; Pacheco (yellow card) 79'; Roushandel (yellow card) 90'	Report	(yellow card) 13' Garcia; (yellow card) 48' (goal) 50' Rivera; (yellow card) 70' Dastan; (yellow card) 79' Griffin; 81' Bravo; 91+' Gaitan	Stadium: Josue Gonzalez Stadium; Attendance: 2,109; Referee: Javier Santos

April 17, 2011 2	Antigua Barracuda	1–2	Los Angeles Blues	Saint George Parish, Antigua and Barbuda
16:00 PST		Report		Stadium: Stanford Cricket Ground

April 20, 2011 3	Puerto Rico United	2–4	Los Angeles Blues	Aguada, Puerto Rico
17:00 PST		Report		Stadium: Aguada Stadium

April 23, 2011 4	River Plate Puerto Rico	1–1	Los Angeles Blues	Carolina, Puerto Rico
17:00 PST		Report		Stadium: Roberto Clemente Stadium

=== U.S. Open Cup ===
June 14, 2011 R1	Los Angeles Blues	3–1	Hollywood United Hitmen	Riverside, California
19:30 PST	Momeni 37' 55'; Bravo 90'	Report	Morales 67'	Stadium: Riverside Community College

June 21, 2011 R2	Ventura County Fusion	0–1	Los Angeles Blues	Ventura, California
16:00 PST		Report	45' Sesay	Stadium: Ventura College

June 28, 2011 R3	Los Angeles Blues	1–2	Los Angeles Galaxy	Fullerton, California
17:00 PST				Stadium: Titan Stadium

== League standings ==
=== National Division ===
Pos	Team	Pld	W	T	L	GF	GA	GD	Pts	Qualification
1	Rochester Rhinos (A)	24	12	4	8	31	23	+8	40	2011 USL Pro Playoffs (Note: The top four clubs in each division are guaranteed spots in the 2011 USL PRO Playoffs.)
2	Harrisburg City Islanders (A)	24	10	7	7	37	30	+7	37	2011 USL Pro Playoffs
3	Los Angeles Blues (A)	24	8	9	7	34	29	+5	33	2011 USL Pro Playoffs
4	Pittsburgh Riverhounds (A)	24	7	6	11	23	32	−9	27	2011 USL Pro Playoffs
5	F.C. New York	24	6	7	11	27	37	−10	25	
6	Dayton Dutch Lions	24	2	6	16	21	54	−33	12	

Source: USL Pro official standings
Rules for classification: Points, then tiebreak: 1) Head-to-head record based on total points in League games, 2) Total wins in League games, 3) Goal difference in League games, 4) Goals scored in League games, etc.
(A) Advances to USL Pro Playoffs

== Club ==
=== Roster ===
as of May 22, 2011

Note: Flags indicate national team as defined under FIFA eligibility rules; some limited exceptions apply. Players may hold more than one non-FIFA nationality.

No.	Pos.	Nation	Player
1	GK	MEX	Oscar Dautt
2	DF	CUB	Erlys García
3	DF	USA	Josh Suggs
4	DF	USA	Cameron Dunn
5	DF	USA	Nelson Akwari
6	MF	PER	Jhonny Bravo
7	MF	USA	Josh Tudela
8	MF	IRI	Shahryar Dastan
9	FW	USA	Chukwudi Chijindu (on loan from Chivas USA)
10	MF	ARG	Walter Gaitán
11	FW	JAM	Akeem Priestley
12	DF	USA	Leonard Griffin (on loan from Orlando City)
14	DF	IRI	Mehrshad Momeni
15	MF	BRA	Adriano de Lima

No.	Pos.	Nation	Player
17	MF	PER	Gerardo Bravo
18	GK	USA	Tony Peiffer
19	MF	USA	Dane Saintus (*)
20	DF	USA	Leon Abravanel (*)
21	DF	USA	Mike Randolph
22	GK	IRI	Amir Abedzadeh
23	DF	USA	Justin Valashinas (*)
24	MF	USA	Cesar Rivera
25	FW	USA	Israel Sesay
26	MF	ESA	Edwin Miranda
33	MF	BRA	Federico Cino (*)
77	FW	SRB	Tomislav Colic
—	FW	ANT	Peter Byers
—	DF	ENG	Luke Chambers (*)

- Note: (*) indicates a player on loan to the PDL Los Angeles Blues 23 side

=== Management and staff ===
- (United States) Charlie Naimo - Head Coach
- (Iran) Shayon Jalayer - Assistant Coach
- (Mexico) Agustin Rodriguez - Assistant Coach
- (Mexico) Salvador Moran - Assistant Coach
- (Iran) Ahmad Reza Abedzadeh - Goalkeeper Coach
- (United States) Alyse LaHue - General Manager
- (United States) Alli D'Amico - Director of Operations

=== Statistics ===
List of squad players, including number of appearances by competition

No.	Pos	Nat	Player	Total		USL Pro		Playoffs		U.S. Open Cup	
No.	Pos	Nat	Player	Apps	Goals	Apps	Goals	Apps	Goals	Apps	Goals
1	GK	(Mexico) MEX	Oscar Dautt	0	0	0+0	0	0	0	0	0
2	DF	(Cuba) CUB	Erlys García	0	0	0+0	0	0	0	0	0
3	DF	(United States) USA	Josh Suggs	0	0	0+0	0	0	0	0	0
4	DF	(United States) USA	Cameron Dunn	0	0	0+0	0	0	0	0	0
5	DF	(United States) USA	Nelson Akwari	0	0	0+0	0	0	0	0	0
6	MF	(Peru) PER	Jhonny Bravo	0	0	0+0	0	0	0	0	0
7	MF	(United States) USA	Josh Tudela	0	0	0+0	0	0	0	0	0
8	MF	(Iran) IRI	Shahryar Dastan	0	0	0+0	0	0	0	0	0
9	FW	(United States) USA	Chukwudi Chijindu (on loan from Chivas USA)	0	0	0+0	0	0	0	0	0
10	MF	(Argentina) ARG	Walter Gaitán	0	0	0+0	0	0	0	0	0
11	FW	(Jamaica) JAM	Akeem Priestley	0	0	0+0	0	0	0	0	0
12	DF	(United States) USA	Leonard Griffin (on loan from Orlando City)	0	0	0+0	0	0	0	0	0
14	DF	(Iran) IRI	Mehrshad Momeni	0	0	0+0	0	0	0	0	0
15	MF	(Brazil) BRA	Adriano de Lima	0	0	0+0	0	0	0	0	0
17	MF	(Peru) PER	Gerardo Bravo	0	0	0+0	0	0	0	0	0
18	GK	(United States) USA	Tony Peiffer	0	0	0+0	0	0	0	0	0
19	MF	(United States) USA	Dane Saintus	0	0	0+0	0	0	0	0	0
20	DF	(United States) USA	Leon Abravanel	0	0	0+0	0	0	0	0	0
21	DF	(United States) USA	Mike Randolph	0	0	0+0	0	0	0	0	0
22	GK	(Iran) IRI	Amir Abedzadeh	0	0	0+0	0	0	0	0	0
23	DF	(United States) USA	Justin Valashinas	0	0	0+0	0	0	0	0	0
24	MF	(United States) USA	Cesar Rivera	0	0	0+0	0	0	0	0	0
25	FW	(United States) USA	Israel Sesay	0	0	0+0	0	0	0	0	0
26	MF	(El Salvador) ESA	Edwin Miranda	0	0	0+0	0	0	0	0	0
33	MF	(Brazil) BRA	Federico Cino	0	0	0+0	0	0	0	0	0
77	FW	(Serbia) SRB	Tomislav Colic	0	0	0+0	0	0	0	0	0
—	FW	(Antigua and Barbuda) ANT	Peter Byers	0	0	0+0	0	0	0	0	0
—	DF	(England) ENG	Luke Chambers	0	0	0+0	0	0	0	0	0

== Transfers ==
=== Loan ===
==== In ====
Player	Pos.	Loaned from	Start	End	Ref
(United States) Chukwudi Chijindu	FW	(United States) Chivas USA	March 23, 2011	TBD	
(United States) Leonard Griffin	DF	(United States) Orlando City	March 23, 2011	TBD	

==== Out ====
Player	Pos.	Loaned to	Start	End	Ref
(South Africa) Ty Shipalane	MF	(United States) Richmond Kickers	April 16, 2010	April 20, 2010	
