= 2013 Los Angeles Blues season =

Los Angeles Blues
2013 season
- Owner: Mansouri Family
- Head Coach: Jesus Rico-Sanz (Until June 20); Dariush Yazdani (After June 20)
- Stadium: Titan Stadium
- USL Pro: 6th
- USL Pro Playoffs: Quarter-Finals
- U.S. Open Cup: Third round
- Top goalscorer: Chris Cortez, Matt Fondy (10)
Home colors	Away colors

The 2013 Los Angeles Blues season was the club's 4th season, and their 4th season playing in the third division of the USL Pro.

The season was the final season that the team was named the Los Angeles Blues, as the club rebranded to Orange County Blues FC, to represent the county they played in, Orange County. Additionally, it was the final season that the club played in Titan Stadium on the campus of Cal State Fullerton, due to the team changing their grounds to Anteater Stadium in Irvine.

During the middle of the season, the Blues experienced a coaching change, as Jesus Rico-Sanz departed the club fourteen matches into the season. He was subsequently replaced by head coach Dariush Yazdani, who led the team to a record of 11-7-8 record and the 6th seed, qualifying for the playoffs. However, they were eliminated by the Charleston Battery 2–1.

== Roster ==
As of June 29, 2014

Note: Flags indicate national team as defined under FIFA eligibility rules; some limited exceptions apply. Players may hold more than one non-FIFA nationality.

No.	Pos.	Nation	Player
1	GK	USA	Carl Woszczynski
2	DF	PHI	Charley Pettys
3	DF	USA	Jimmy Turner
4	MF	USA	Nelson Pizarro
5	DF	SSD	Duach Jock
6	DF	USA	Cory Miller
7	FW	SCO	Allan Russell
8	FW	MEX	Kichi
9	FW	USA	Chris Cortez
10	MF	IRI	Dariush Yazdani
11	FW	USA	George Davis IV
12	DF	USA	Matheau Hall
13	DF	IRI	Mehrshad Momeni
14	MF	USA	David Bakal
15	MF	USA	Adrian Dubois
16	DF	USA	Conor Hearn

No.	Pos.	Nation	Player
17	MF	USA	Rodrigo López
19	FW	USA	Aaron Horton
19	FW	USA	Duran Stanley
20	MF	MEX	Gabriel Gonzalez
22	GK	IRI	Mohammad Mohammadi
23	FW	USA	Sergio Valle-Ortiz
24	GK	USA	Aaron Perez
25	FW	USA	Matthew Fondy
27	MF	NZL	Shay Spitz
28	DF	CUB	Erlys García
31	GK	USA	Steve Gonzalez
47	FW	MEX	Leopoldo Morales
67	FW	CUB	Maykel Galindo
77	MF	IRI	Mohammad Roknipour
90	DF	SCO	Ryan O'Leary

== Competitions ==
=== USL Pro ===
==== Standings ====
Pos	Team	Pld	W	T	L	GF	GA	GD	Pts	Qualification
4	Harrisburg City Islanders (A)	26	14	2	10	55	39	+16	44	Playoffs
5	Charlotte Eagles (A)	26	10	11	5	44	39	+5	41	Playoffs
6	Los Angeles Blues (A)	26	11	7	8	52	37	+15	40	Playoffs
7	Pittsburgh Riverhounds (A)	26	10	8	8	36	33	+3	38	Playoffs
8	Dayton Dutch Lions (A)	26	10	7	9	43	46	−3	37	Playoffs

Source: USL Pro official standings
Rules for classification: 1) points; 2) goal difference; 3) number of goals scored.
(A) Advances to USL Pro Playoffs

=== U.S. Open Cup ===
As a member of the USL Pro, the Los Angeles Blues entered the U.S. Open Cup during the second round.

May 21, 2013 Second Round	Los Angeles Blues (USL Pro)	5–1	Ventura County Fusion (PDL)	Fullerton, California
6:30 PM PDT	G. Gonzalez 4'; Spitz 7'; Momeni 12'; Russell 29', 35'	report	Palacios (yellow card) 40'; Schmetz 87'	Stadium: Titan Stadium; Referee: Ashbir Singh

May 28, 2013 Third Round	Los Angeles Blues (USL Pro)	1–2	Chivas USA (MLS)	Fullerton, California
7:30 PM PDT	Davis IV 11'; Jock (yellow card) 25'; Pizarro (yellow card) 60'	Report	Alvarez 52'; Kennedy 62' (pen.); Bolaños (yellow card) 71' de Luna (yellow card) 77'; Borja (yellow card) 90+2'	Stadium: Titan Stadium; Referee: Daniel Radford (California)
