= List of Orange County SC seasons =

The American soccer club Orange County SC, previously known as Los Angeles Blues and Orange County Blues FC, has competed in the USL Championship since its founding in 2011. The following list includes each season of the club's existence, documenting its performance in all competitive competitions.

== Key ==
Key to competitions

- USL Championship (USLC) – The second division of soccer in the United States, established in 2010 and previously known as USL and USL Pro. The Championship was the third division of American soccer from its founding until its elevation to second division status in 2017.
- U.S. Open Cup (USOC) – The premier knockout cup competition in US soccer, first contested in 1914.
- CONCACAF Champions League (CCL) – The premier competition in North American soccer since 1962. It went by the name of Champions' Cup until 2008.

Key to colors and symbols

1st or W	Winners
2nd or RU	Runners-up
Last	Wooden Spoon
♦	League Golden Boot
	Highest average attendance

Key to league record

- Season = The year and article of the season
- Div = Level on pyramid
- League = League name
- Pld = Games played
- W = Games won
- L = Games lost
- D = Games drawn
- GF = Goals scored
- GA = Goals against
- Pts = Points
- PPG = Points per game
- Conf = Conference position
- Overall = League position

Key to cup record

- DNE = Did not enter
- DNQ = Did not qualify
- NH = Competition not held or canceled
- QR = Qualifying round
- PR = Preliminary round
- GS = Group stage
- R1 = First round
- R2 = Second round
- R3 = Third round
- R4 = Fourth round
- R5 = Fifth round
- QF = Quarterfinals
- SF = Semifinals
- RU = Runners-up
- W = Winners

== Seasons ==
Season	League											Position		Playoffs	USOC	Continental / Other	Average attendance	Top goalscorer(s)	
Season	Div	League	Pld	W	L	D	GF	GA	GD	Pts	PPG	Conf.	Overall	Playoffs	USOC	Continental / Other	Average attendance	Name	Goals
2011	3	USL Pro	24	8	7	9	34	29	+5	33	1.38	3rd	7th	QF	Ro16	Ineligible	440	(United States) Cesar Rivera	7
2012	3	USL Pro	24	9	12	3	26	29	–3	30	1.25	N/A	8th	DNQ	R2	DNQ	687	(Nigeria) Bright Dike	6
2013	3	USL Pro	26	11	8	7	52	37	+15	40	1.54	N/A	6th	QF	R3	DNQ	718	(United States) Matthew Fondy	10
2014	3	USL Pro	28	9	18	1	31	54	–23	28	1.00	N/A	13th	DNQ	R2	DNQ	766	(Scotland) Allan Russell	8
2015	3	USL	28	14	9	5	38	34	+4	47	1.68	1st	3rd	QF	R4	DNQ	1,398	(El Salvador) Christopher Ramirez	8
2016	3	USL	30	12	14	4	39	41	−2	40	1.33	8th	15th	QF	R2	DNQ	1,010	(Trinidad and Tobago) Trevin Caesar	10
2017	2	USL	32	11	11	10	43	47	–4	43	1.34	10th	18th	DNQ	R4	DNQ	2,575	(United States) Irvin Parra	11
2018	2	USL	34	20	8	6	70	40	+30	66	1.94	1st	2nd	SF	R2	DNQ	3,095	(Denmark) Thomas Enevoldsen	21
2019	2	USLC	34	15	10	9	54	43	+11	54	1.59	5th	12th	R1	R2	DNQ	3,192	(Jamaica) Michael Seaton (United States) Darwin Jones	13
2020	2	USLC	16	7	6	3	18	18	0	24	1.50	9th	17th	DNQ	NH	DNQ	3,188	(United States) Sean Okoli	7
2021	2	USLC	32	15	10	7	44	37	+7	52	1.63	2nd	7th	W	NH	DNQ	3,302	(Haiti) Ronaldo Damus	16
2022	2	USLC	34	7	14	13	49	59	-10	34	1.00	13th	23rd	DNQ	R3	DNQ	4,230	(United States) Milan Iloski	23 ♦
2023	2	USLC	34	17	11	6	46	39	+7	57	1.68	2nd	5th	SF	R3	DNQ	4,411	(United States) Milan Iloski	20
2024	2	USLC	34	13	14	7	40	47	-7	46	1.35	6th	14th	SF	R3	DNQ	4,138	(United States) Ethan Zubak	11
2025	2	USLC	30	10	11	9	45	47	-2	39	1.3	7th	13th	SF	R3	DNQ	4,470	(United States) Ethan Zubak	11
Total	–	–	440	178	163	99	629	601	+28	594	1.43	–	–	–	–	–	–	(United States) Milan Iloski	43

1. Avg. attendance only includes statistics from regular season matches.
2. Top goalscorer(s) includes all goals scored in the regular season, playoffs, U.S. Open Cup, and other competitive matches.
