= 2014 Orange County Blues FC season =

Orange County Blues FC
2014 season
- Owner: Mansouri Family
- Head coach: Dariush Yazdani
- Stadium: Anteater Stadium
- USL Pro: 13th
- USL Pro Playoffs: DNQ
- U.S. Open Cup: Second round
- Top goalscorer: Allan Russell (6)
- Highest home attendance: 1,226 (July 26 v. LA Galaxy II)
- Lowest home attendance: 431 (May 8 v. Charlotte)
- Average home league attendance: 710
Home colors	Away colors

The 2014 Orange County Blues FC season was the club's fifth season of existence, and their fifth season playing in the third division of American soccer, USL Pro.

== Roster ==
as of May 31, 2014

No.	Position	Nation	Player
2	MF	GHA	Stephen Okai
4	DF	USA	Fabrice Gautrat
5	MF	USA	Aaron Kovar (on loan from Seattle Sounders FC)
6	DF	USA	Jimmy Turner
7	FW	SCO	Allan Russell
9	FW	USA	Chris Cortez
10	MF	USA	Cesar Rivera
11	DF	USA	Kwame Watson-Siriboe (on loan from Real Salt Lake)
12	FW	USA	Enrique Cardenas
13	MF	IRI	Mehrshad Momeni
14	MF	KOR	Seung Ju Kim
15	DF	USA	Josh Suggs
16	MF	USA	Jiovanni Santana
17	FW	USA	Gibson Bardsley
18	MF	USA	Seth Moses
19	MF	USA	Will Prado
20	MF	USA	Christopher Santana
21	DF	USA	Taylor Peay (on loan from Portland Timbers)
23	FW	USA	Andrew Hoxie
27	MF	IRI	Mohammad Roknipour
28	MF	USA	Dersu Abolfathi

== Competitions ==
=== USL Pro ===
==== Standings ====
Pos	Team	Pld	W	T	L	GF	GA	GD	Pts
10	Oklahoma City Energy FC	28	9	5	14	32	37	−5	32
11	Pittsburgh Riverhounds	28	9	5	14	35	49	−14	32
12	Charlotte Eagles	28	9	4	15	33	40	−7	31
13	Orange County Blues FC	28	9	1	18	31	54	−23	28
14	Dayton Dutch Lions	28	6	4	18	28	63	−35	22

Source: USL Pro official standings
Rules for classification: 1) points; 2) goal difference; 3) number of goals scored.

==== Match results ====
March 22	LA Galaxy II	3–1	Orange County Blues FC	Carson, California
7:00 pm PT	Covarrubias (yellow card) 8'; Garcia (yellow card) 34'; Rugg 40'; Walker 45'; Emory (yellow card) 52'; Steres 58'	Report	O'Leary (yellow card) 34'; Okai 42' (yellow card) 58'; Santana (yellow card) 54'	Stadium: StubHub Center; Attendance: 1,259; Referee: Bernhard Hosu

April 5	Orange County Blues FC	0–2	Oklahoma City Energy	Irvine, California
7:00 pm PT	Momeni (yellow card) 62'; Rivera (yellow card) 68' (yellow-red card) 86'; Russell (yellow card) 70'	Report	Greig 11' (yellow card) 46'; Shiffman 28'	Stadium: Anteater Stadium; Attendance: 1,221; Referee: Robert Sarfaraz

April 12	Orange County Blues FC	2–1	Sacramento Republic	Irvine, California
7:00 pm PT	Russell 19' (pen.) (yellow card) 90'; Santana (yellow card) 25'; Okai (yellow card) 32' (goal) 70'	Report	Daly 8'; Vuković (yellow card) 18'; Mirković (yellow card) 28'; Delbridge (red card) 69'	Stadium: Anteater Stadium; Attendance: 638; Referee: Tyler Ploeger

April 19	LA Galaxy II	3–1	Orange County Blues FC	Carson, California
7:30 pm PT	Auras (yellow card) 37'; Rugg 49'; Garcia (yellow card) 61'; Hoffman 73'; Courtois 90'	Report	Bardsley (yellow card) 6'; Santana 9'; Gautrat (red card) 88'	Stadium: StubHub Center; Attendance: 435; Referee: Daniel Radford

April 24	Orange County Blues FC	4–1	Harrisburg City Islanders	Irvine, California
7:00 pm PT	Santana 6', 25'; Moses (yellow card) 17'; Cortez 74', 87'	Report	Hernández (yellow card) 31', (goal) 44'	Stadium: Anteater Stadium; Attendance: 616; Referee: Chris Calderon

April 27	Orange County Blues FC	0–3	LA Galaxy II	Irvine, California
7:00 pm PT	Momeni (yellow card) 29' (red card) 76'; McKenzie (yellow card) 32'; Rivera (yellow card) 56'	Report	Garcia 34'; Arreola (yellow card) 45'; Bowen 50'; Zardes 65'	Stadium: Anteater Stadium; Attendance: 913; Referee: Ramon Hernandez

May 3	Sacramento Republic	2–1	Orange County Blues FC	Sacramento, California
7:00 pm PT	Stewart 42'; Fochive (yellow card) 65'; Jahn 70'	Report	Russell 48'; Turner (yellow card) 54'; McLain (yellow card) 71'	Stadium: Hughes Stadium; Attendance: 17,414; Referee: Michael Zapata

May 8	Orange County Blues FC	0–2	Charlotte Eagles	Irvine, California
7:30 pm PT	Okai (yellow card) 24'	Report	Yates 33'; Newnam 58'; Leathers (yellow card) 90'	Stadium: Anteater Stadium; Attendance: 431; Referee: Bernhard Hosu

May 10	Oklahoma City Energy	0–1	Orange County Blues FC	Oklahoma City, Oklahoma
7:00 pm PT	Ellis (yellow card) 6'	Report	Gautrat (yellow card) 35'; Bardsley 90'; Turner (yellow card) 90'	Stadium: Pribil Stadium; Attendance: 3,860; Referee: Juliana Duncan

May 18	Seattle Sounders Reserves	1–0	Orange County Blues FC	Tukwila, Washington
1:00 pm PT	Weaver 73'	Report	Cardenas (yellow card) 57'; Hoxie (yellow card) 72'; Momeni (yellow card) 86'	Stadium: Starfire Sports Stadium; Referee: Levi Rippy

May 31	Orange County Blues FC	2–0	Arizona United	Irvine, California
7:00 pm PT	Sofia (yellow card) 9'; Russell 15', (yellow card) 89'; Momeni (yellow card) 39'; Cortez (yellow card) 46'; Suggs (yellow card) 59'; Cardenas (yellow card) 81'; Okai (yellow card) 84'; Roknipour 90'	Report	Antúnez (yellow card) 37'; Baladez (yellow card) 90'; Toby (red card) 90'; Kassel (red card) 90'	Stadium: Anteater Stadium; Attendance: 538; Referee: Alejandro Mariscal

June 7	Orange County Blues FC	4–3	Dayton Dutch Lions	Irvine, California
7:00 pm PT	Cortez 18', 64'; Suggs 19', (yellow card) 54'; Russell 22'; Peay (yellow card) 45'; Kim (yellow card) 84'	Report	Walker 12'; Williams (yellow card) 53'; Garner 79'; DeLass 90'	Stadium: Anteater Stadium; Attendance: 706; Referee: Ramon Hernandez

June 11	Orlando City	4–1	Orange County Blues FC	Lake Buena Vista, Florida
7:00 pm ET	Hertzog 45' da Luz 50'; Rusin 79', 87'	Report	Santana 38'; Gonzalez (yellow card) 22'; Russell (yellow card) 37'; Long (yellow card) 72'	Stadium: Hess Field; Attendance: 4,206; Referee: Andres Pfefferkorn

June 13	Charlotte Eagles	0–1	Orange County Blues FC	Charlotte, North Carolina
7:00 pm ET	Thompson (yellow card) 90'	Report	Suggs (yellow card) 36' (red card) 90'; Okoli (yellow card) 58'; Santana 80'	Stadium: Dickson Field; Attendance: 738; Referee: Katja Koraleva

June 21	Orange County Blues FC	2-1	Chivas USA Reserves	Irvine, California
7:00 pm PT	Cortez 6'; Russell 31'; Momeni (yellow card) 34'; Sofia (yellow card) 70'	Report	Finley 67'	Stadium: Anteater Stadium; Attendance: 942; Referee: Charles Zuckerman

June 28	Arizona United	2–3	Orange County Blues FC	Peoria, Arizona
7:00 pm PT	Woodberry (yellow card) 13'; Okafor 19'; Dacres 36'; DelPiccolo (yellow card) 90'	Report	Santana (yellow card) 33'; Russell 41'; Sofia (yellow card) 51'; Suggs 66'; Hoxie 90'	Stadium: Peoria Sports Complex; Attendance: 1,839; Referee: Ramy Touchan

July 7	Sacramento Republic	2-1	Orange County Blues FC	Sacramento, California
7:00 pm PT	Mirković (yellow card) 21'; López 32', (yellow card) 86'; Jahn (yellow card) 50'; Stewart (yellow card) 86'; Guzman 90'	Report	Gonzalez 35'; McLain (yellow card) 86'; Russell (yellow card) 90'	Stadium: Hughes Stadium; Attendance: 8,000; Referee: Nestor Chavez

July 12	Orange County Blues FC	1 - 2	Arizona United SC	Irvine, California
7:00 pm PT	Barron (yellow card) 35'; Roknipour (yellow card) 55'; Cardenas 77'; Gautrat (yellow card) 81'	Report	Woodberry (yellow card) 30'; Stisser 37'; Okafor 74'	Stadium: Anteater Stadium; Attendance: 586; Referee: Jared Kennedy

July 19	Arizona United SC	3 - 0	Orange County Blues FC	Peoria, Arizona
7:30 pm PT	Kassel 22'; Tan 27', (yellow card) 35'; Top (yellow card) 82'; Saint Cyr (yellow card) 89'; Dacres 90'	Team Report; League Report		Stadium: Peoria Sports Complex; Attendance: 2,238; Referee: Ramon Hernandez

July 26	Orange County Blues FC	v	LA Galaxy II	Irvine, California
7:00 pm PT	Gautrat (red card) 30'	Team Report; League Report	Auras 4'; Hoffman 40', 41'; Stojkov 64'	Stadium: Anteater Stadium; Attendance: 1,226; Referee: Bernard Hosu

August 2	Oklahoma City Energy	1 - 0	Orange County Blues FC	Oklahoma City, Oklahoma
7:00 pm CT				Stadium: Pribil Stadium; Attendance: 3,351

August 8	Pittsburgh Riverhounds	1 - 0	Orange County Blues FC	Pittsburgh, Pennsylvania
7:00 pm ET				Stadium: Highmark Stadium; Attendance: 2,348

August 10	Rochester Rhinos	0 - 1	Orange County Blues FC	Rochester, New York
6:05 pm ET				Stadium: Sahen's Stadium; Attendance: 4,657

August 13	Charleston Battery	3 - 2	Orange County Blues FC	Charleston, South Carolina
7:30 pm ET				Stadium: Blackbaud Stadium; Attendance: 2,988

August 17	Orange County Blues FC	1 - 6	Sacramento Republic FC	Irvine, California
4:00 pm PT				Stadium: Anteater Stadium; Attendance: 753

August 23	Orange County Blues FC	1 - 2	Wilmington Hammerheads	Irvine, California
7:00 pm PT				Stadium: Anteater Stadium; Attendance: 722

August 30	Orange County Blues FC	1 - 1	Richmond Kickers	Irvine, California
7:00 pm PT				Stadium: Anteater Stadium; Attendance: 585

September 6	Orange County Blues FC	0 - 1	Oklahoma City Energy	Irvine, California
7:00 pm PT				Stadium: Anteater Stadium; Attendance: 842

=== U.S. Open Cup ===
May 14 Second round	Fresno Fuego	2–0	Orange County Blues FC	Fresno, California
6:00 pm PT				Stadium: Chukchansi Park
