= 2015 Orange County Blues FC season =

Orange County Blues FC
2015 season
- Owner: Mansouri Family
- Head Coach: Oliver Wyss
- Stadium: Anteater Stadium
- USL: Conference: 1st Overall: 3rd
- USL Playoffs: Quarterfinals
- U.S. Open Cup: Second Round
- Top goalscorer: League: Christopher Ramirez (10); All: Christopher Ramirez (10)
- Average home league attendance: 1,398
Home colors	Away colors

The 2015 Orange County Blues FC season was the club's sixth season of existence and their sixth season playing in the third tier of American soccer, USL.

The Blues were dominant all season, winning fourteen games and placing first in the Western Conference with a record of 14–5–9, which automatically qualified them for the USL Playoffs Semi-Finals. Despite their dominance throughout the season, they were ultimately shut-out in a 2–0 defeat against rivals LA Galaxy II at StubHub Center.

== Roster ==
As of June 30, 2024

Note: Flags indicate national team as defined under FIFA eligibility rules; some limited exceptions apply. Players may hold more than one non-FIFA nationality.

No.	Pos.	Nation	Player
1	GK	USA	Josh Cohen
3	DF	CAN	Nikola Paunic
4	MF	USA	Milton Blanco
5	DF	USA	Beto Navarro
6	DF	USA	Jummy Turner
7	MF	USA	Christopher Santana
8	MF	USA	Jiovanni Santana
9	FW	USA	Chris Cortez
10	MF	MNE	Luka Petričević
11	FW	CUW	Denzel Slager
12	FW	USA	Amani Walker
13	DF	IRI	Mershad Momeni
14	DF	USA	Josh Suggs
15	DF	ESA	Junior Burgos
16	MF	KOR	Kim Seung-ju

No.	Pos.	Nation	Player
17	MF	USA	Nikola Ilich
18	GK	USA	Billy Thompson
19	MF	USA	Jacob Barron
20	DF	USA	Jackson McCracken
21	MF	SUI	Didier Crettenand
22	FW	ESA	Christopher Ramírez
23	DF	JAM	Brenton Griffiths
24	FW	USA	David Estrada
27	FW	SRB	Tyler Feeley
29	DF	GUA	Jefrey Payeras
30	GK	CUB	José Miranda
31	DF	USA	Ryan Felix
37	DF	GER	Romeo Filipović
87	MF	SRB	Pavle Popara

== Competitions ==
=== United Soccer League ===
==== Standings ====
Pos	Team	Pld	W	D	L	GF	GA	GD	Pts	Qualification
1	Orange County Blues	28	14	5	9	38	34	+4	47	Conference semi-finals
2	Oklahoma City Energy	28	13	8	7	44	36	+8	47	Conference semi-finals
3	Colorado Springs Switchbacks	28	14	4	10	53	35	+18	46	First round
4	Sacramento Republic	28	13	7	8	43	31	+12	46	First round
5	LA Galaxy II	28	14	3	11	39	31	+8	45	First round

Source: 2015 USL schedule
Rules for classification: 1) head-to-head; 2) total wins; 3) total goal differential; 4) total goals scored; 5) disciplinary points; 6) away goals scored; 7) away goal differential; 8) home goals scored; 9) home goal differential; 10) coin toss or drawing of lots

=== U.S. Open Cup ===
As a member of the USL, the Blues entered the U.S. Open Cup in the second round, facing amateur club PSA Elite, a member of the USASA.

May 20, 2015 Second Round	PSA Elite	2-1	Orange County Blues FC	Irvine, California
7:00 PM PST	Salazar 19'; Bjurman 61'; Wallace (red card) 82'	Report	Feeley 90'	Stadium: University High School
