= Aaron Perez =

American soccer player

Personal information
- Full name: Aaron Louis Perez
- Date of birth: August 28, 1986 (age 40)
- Place of birth: Covina, California, United States
- Height: 6 ft 4 in (1.93 m)
- Position: Goalkeeper

College career
Years	Team	Apps	(Gls)
2005–2008	UCLA Bruins		

Senior career*
Years	Team	Apps	(Gls)
2012	Pali Blues	8	(0)
2013–2015	Orange County Blues	10	(0)
2016	Minnesota United FC	0	(0)
- * Club domestic league appearances and goals as of February 22, 2016

Aaron Louis Perez (born August 28, 1986) is an American former soccer and football player. He played four years of football and three years of soccer at Charter Oak High School in Covina, California. He played college football for the UCLA Bruins from 2005 to 2008 as a punter. Perez set UCLA career records with 286 punts and 12,220 punting yards. He signed with the New England Patriots of the National Football League (NFL) on May 2, 2009, after going undrafted in the 2009 NFL draft. He was released by the Patriots on May 29, 2009. Perez became a professional soccer player after his football career.
