= Josh Suggs =

American soccer player (born 1989)

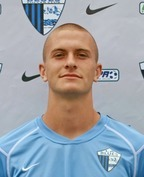

Personal information
- Full name: Joshua Taylor Suggs
- Date of birth: April 26, 1989 (age 37)
- Place of birth: Las Cruces, New Mexico, United States
- Height: 6 ft 1 in (1.85 m)
- Positions: Left back; centre half

College career
Years	Team	Apps	(Gls)
2007–2010	Humboldt State Lumberjacks		

Senior career*
Years	Team	Apps	(Gls)
2011	Los Angeles Blues	8	(0)
2012	San Jose Earthquakes	0	(0)
2012	→ Tampa Bay Rowdies (loan)	0	(0)
2012	Los Angeles Blues	9	(0)
2013	Atlanta Silverbacks	2	(0)
2014–2015	Orange County Blues	47	(2)
2016–2018	Colorado Springs Switchbacks	92	(6)
2019–2023	New Mexico United	115	(4)
- * Club domestic league appearances and goals as of January 6, 2024

Joshua Taylor Suggs (born April 26, 1989, in Las Cruces, New Mexico) is an American former professional soccer player who last played for New Mexico United in the USL Championship. He frequently played as either a left back or as a centre half.

== Career ==
=== Youth and amateur ===
Suggs attended Las Cruces High School, and was a member of the New Mexico Olympic Development Program (ODP) State Team for five years, before going on to play four years of college soccer at Humboldt State University. With the Jacks he earned honorable mention All-CCAA honors as a sophomore in 2008, was an NSCAA Division II All-West Region third-team selection and a second-team All-CCAA honoree as a junior in 2009 and again as a senior in 2010. He captained the team in his senior year in 2010.

=== Professional ===
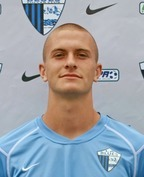
Suggs during his rookie year with the LA Blues

Suggs turned professional when he signed with the expansion Los Angeles Blues now formally known as the Orange County Blues FC of the USL Professional League in February 2010. He made his professional debut on April 15, 2011, in a 3–0 victory over Sevilla Puerto Rico

He signed with San Jose Earthquakes of Major League Soccer on March 9, 2012.

On April 5, 2012, Suggs was loaned to NASL club Tampa Bay Rowdies for the 2012 season.

Suggs was waived by San Jose on June 28, 2012.

=== Colorado Springs Switchbacks FC ===
Suggs signed with Colorado Springs Switchbacks of the United Soccer League in January 2016. Suggs scored his first goal for the Colorado Springs Switchbacks in a 2–1 friendly victory against Air Force Falcon's Soccer team.

=== New Mexico United ===
In November of 2018 New Mexico United announced that they had signed Suggs for their inaugural USL Championship season in 2019. He subsequently signed single year contracts to stay with the club from 2020 to 2023.

Suggs captained the team from 2019 to 2021, scoring a personal best three goals from his wingback position during the 2021 campaign. On July 22nd, 2023 Suggs became just the fifth player, at that time, in history to surpass 20,000 minutes in USL Championship play.

New Mexico United announced Suggs' retirement from professional soccer on 20 Jan 2024.

== Career statistics ==
As of match played July 30, 2024

Appearances and goals by club, season, and competition
Club	Season	League			Domestic Cup		League Cup		Total	
Club	Season	Division	Apps	Goals	Apps	Goals	Apps	Goals	Apps	Goals
Los Angeles Blues	2011	USL Pro	6	0	0	0	0	0	6	0
San Jose Earthquakes	2012	MLS	0	0	1 (Note: Appearance(s) in the US Open Cup)	0	0	0	0	0
Tampa Bay Rowdies (loan)	2012	NASL	0	0	0	0	0	0	0	0
Los Angeles Blues	2012	USL Pro	9	0	0	0	—		9	0
Atlanta Silverbacks	2013	NASL	2	0	0	0	0	0	2	0
Orange County Blues	2014	USL Pro	22	2	0	0	—		22	2
Orange County Blues	2015	USL	25	0	0	0	1 (Note: Appearance(s) in USL Cup playoffs)	0	26	0
Orange County Blues	Total		47	2	0	0	1	0	48	2
Colorado Springs Switchbacks	2016	USL	30	2	2	0	1	0	33	2
Colorado Springs Switchbacks	2017	USL	28	2	2	0	—		30	2
Colorado Springs Switchbacks	2018	USL	34	2	2	0	—		36	2
Colorado Springs Switchbacks	Total		92	6	6	0	1	0	99	6
New Mexico United	2019	USL Championship	26	1	2	0	1 (Note: Appearance(s) in USL Championship playoffs)	0	29	1
New Mexico United	2020	USL Championship	12	0	—		2	0	14	0
New Mexico United	2021	USL Championship	31	3	—		—		31	3
New Mexico United	2022	USL Championship	15	0	0	0	—		15	0
New Mexico United	2023	USL Championship	27	0	3	0	1	0	31	0
New Mexico United	Total		111	4	5	0	4	0	120	4
Career total			267	12	12	0	6	0	285	12
