= Leon Abravanel =

American soccer player (born 1986)

Personal information
- Date of birth: July 8, 1986 (age 40)
- Place of birth: South Lake Tahoe, California, U.S.
- Height: 5 ft 11 in (1.80 m)
- Position: Defender

Youth career
- 2004–2006: San Diego Toreros
- 2007–2008: Denver Pioneers

Senior career*
Years	Team	Apps	(Gls)
2009	Kitsap Pumas	12	(0)
2011	Los Angeles Blues	3	(0)
2011	→ Los Angeles Blues 23 (loan)	9	(0)
Total		24	(0)
- * Club domestic league appearances and goals

Leon Abravanel (born July 8, 1986) is an American former professional soccer player.

== Soccer career ==
=== Youth and amateur soccer ===
Abravanel attended South Tahoe High School, captaining the team to a state championship in his senior year, played club soccer for the US National Champion San Juan Predators, and was a four-year member of the Region IV Olympic Development Program team. He was also a High School All-American & High School Academic All-American. He then went on to play college soccer at the University of San Diego where he earned a full-rise scholarship. After red-shirting his junior year, he transferred to the University of Denver where he led his program to its first ever NCAA D1 playoff berth while receiving a full-ride scholarship.

Undrafted by any Major League Soccer team out of college, Abravanel subsequently played with the Kitsap Pumas in the USL Premier Development League.

=== Professional soccer ===
Abravanel turned professional when he signed with the expansion Los Angeles Blues of the new USL Professional League in February 2010. He made his professional debut on April 17, 2011, in a 2–1 victory over Antigua Barracuda. His professional soccer career lasted four years and he retired at 25-years-old.
