= Erik Hummel =

American soccer player

Personal information
- Date of birth: September 23, 1987 (age 39)
- Place of birth: New York City, United States
- Position: Midfielder

College career
Years	Team	Apps	(Gls)
2006	Wake Forest Demon Deacons		

Senior career*
Years	Team	Apps	(Gls)
2005–2006	Orange County Blue Star	10	(1)
2007–2008	Austria Wien II	10	(0)
2008–2009	Halesowen Town		
- * Club domestic league appearances and goals

Erik Hummel (born September 23, 1987) is an American former soccer player who played as a midfielder.

== Career ==
Hummel started his career with American fourth tier side Orange County Blue Star. In 2007, Hummel signed for Austria Wien II in the Austrian second tier after almost signing for Dutch top flight side NAC, where he made 10 league appearances and scored 0 goals. On August 3, 2007, he debuted for Austria Wien II during a 2–2 draw with Kapfenberg. In 2008, Hummel signed for Halesowen Town in the English seventh tier, where he gained notoriety for refusing to come out for the second half of a game.
