= Los Angeles Mission College =

Community college in Los Angeles, California, US

Coordinates: 34.315309°N 118.419414°W

- Type: Public community college
- Established: February 1975
- Parent institution: Los Angeles Community College District
- President: Armida Ornelas
- Students: 12,424
- Location: Los Angeles, California, U.S.
- Colors: Blue; Silver
- Nickname: Eagles
- Sporting affiliations: CCCAA – WSC
- Website: www.lamission.edu

Los Angeles Mission College is a public community college in Los Angeles, California. It is part of the Los Angeles Community College District and is accredited by the WASC Accrediting Commission for Community and Junior Colleges.

== History ==
Los Angeles Mission College is the ninth and youngest college established in the Los Angeles Community College District. It was first located in high schools, churches, office buildings, shopping centers, and other locations scattered throughout the city of San Fernando and the Sylmar neighborhood of Los Angeles, and opened its doors to the public in February 1975 with approximately twelve hundred students. The graduating class of 1975 consisted of a single student, who had transferred to the college that semester. Within two years, over 3,000 students were taking classes in fifty different disciplines, including Administration of Justice, Business, Chemistry, Chicano Studies, English, Family and Consumer Studies, Geography, Journalism, Microbiology, Real Estate, and Zoology.

Sixteen years later, the college moved to its permanent campus in the summer of 1991, built on 22 acres (8.9 ha) of land in the northeast part of the Sylmar neighborhood of Los Angeles at the intersection of Hubbard St and Eldridge Ave. Before the Los Angeles Community College District and Mission College purchased the 22 acres of land, it was slated for a public middle school on Hubbard and Eldridge. The permanent campus had only a campus center with a library and the main instructional building with a culinary arts department, a cafeteria, and administrative offices.

Seven years later, a new Library and Learning Resource Center building opened in 1997, relieving the old library in the Campus Center. The large indoor area where the old library was located was turned into an event space with meeting rooms. In 1999, the college graduated 261 students. It celebrated its 25th Anniversary in 2000. In 2002, Mission College constructed a Collaborative Studies Building to house more classes and was dedicated to honor college founder Guadalupe S. Ramirez. On October 28, 2008, the Center for Child Development Studies opened.

By 2008, the campus opened a new parking structure on the south end of the main campus, accommodating the influx of students commuting to the campus. Also in 2008, the college broke ground on the construction of a new student dining area, student store, and Culinary Arts Institute building. In 2009, the college opened the Heath, Athletics, and Fitness building on its new east campus property, relieving the physical education classes that once were housed in the storefronts of shopping centers in Sylmar. In 2009, Mission College began a shuttle service between the main campus and the east campus. The sheriff's building at the college was demolished and moved into temporary bungalow buildings. By the fall of 2009, ground had broken and construction had started on the new Arts, Media & Performance building.

By spring 2011, construction began on the new Center for Math & Science building at the college's East Campus. Also in the fall of 2011, the Los Angeles Community College District purchased an abandoned residential property on Hubbard across from the main campus and built a parking lot and asphalt areas for bungalows. The new Culinary Arts Institute building and Student Store opened on May 7, 2011. The construction of the Media Arts building was delayed for one year until April 2012.

In the spring of 2012, the first main walkway on the campus was repaved in concrete due to a new storm drain placed underneath. During the summer of 2012, construction on the Media Arts building resumed. In the fall of 2012, the Center for Math and Science building opened at east campus, while the East Campus shuttle service was canceled due to a lack of funding

After many delays, the Media Arts building opened in the spring of 2017. By December 2017, a new transit center for the Metro Local bus routes 234 and 230 was built and began service on the main campus on Pasha Street, changing the bus routes and serving the east campus. In January 2018, Mission College expanded its campus and added a Sunland/Tujunga campus location at a shopping center on Foothill Blvd.

On December 4, 2023, the Student Services & Administration Building officially opened. This three-story, 59,000 sq. ft. building centralized the college's student services into one location, which include Financial Aid, Admissions & Records, Counseling, Extended Opportunity Programs & Services (EOPS), Transfer Center, Business Office, Disabled Student Programs & Services (DSPS), Career Center, International Students Office, and the Veterans Resource Center.

== Academics ==
Fall Demographics of student body
Race/ethnicity	2018	2017
Hispanic and Latino American	78%	76%
African American	3%	2%
Asian American	3%	4%
Native Hawaiian or other Pacific Islander	0%	0%
White	8%	10%
Multiracial Americans	1%	1%
International students	1%	1%
Unknown	6%	5%
Gender
Female	60%	60%
Male	40%	40%

In addition to its academic degrees, Los Angeles Mission College also provides vocational education and training in which students may receive certificates in Child Development, Family and Consumer Studies, Paralegal, and Computer Applications.

In October 2023, the college received approval to offer a bachelor's degree in biomanufacturing, making it the fourth bachelor's degree offered by the Los Angeles Community College District. The first cohort of students started the program in the fall of 2024.

== Athletics ==
The college's athletic teams are known as the Eagles. LAMC competes as a member of the California Community College Athletic Association (CCCAA) in the Western State Conference (WSC). The college currently fields eight varsity teams: men’s sports include baseball, cross country, soccer while women’s sports include, cross country, softball, tennis, and volleyball, with basketball added in the fall of 2024.

== Notable alumni ==
- Ivan Becerra, professional soccer player
- Jhonny Bravo, professional soccer player
- Gerardo Bravo, professional soccer player
- Miguel González, professional baseball player
- Gary Matthews Jr., professional baseball player
- Celeste Rodriguez, politician
- Mariana Sandoval, politician
