= Enrique Cardenas (soccer) =

American soccer player (born 1991)

Personal information
- Full name: Enrique Cardenas
- Date of birth: August 5, 1991 (age 35)
- Place of birth: Indio, California, U.S.
- Height: 1.68 m (5 ft 6 in)
- Positions: Attacking midfielder; forward

Team information
- Current team: Los Angeles Force
- Number: 91

College career
Years	Team	Apps	(Gls)
2009–2013	UC Irvine Anteaters	67	(16)

Senior career*
Years	Team	Apps	(Gls)
2012	Orange County Blue Star	15	(6)
2013	OC Blues Strikers	5	(0)
2013	Los Angeles Misioneros	1	(0)
2014	Orange County Blues	19	(1)
2016	Kitsap Pumas	5	(0)
2017–2019	FC Golden State Force	13	(1)
2019–	Los Angeles Force	3	(0)
- * Club domestic league appearances and goals as of April 10, 2021

Enrique Cardenas (born August 5, 1991) is an American soccer player who plays as a midfielder for the Los Angeles Force in the National Independent Soccer Association.

== Career ==
=== College and amateur ===
Cardenas played five years of college soccer at UC Irvine between 2009 and 2013, including a red-shirted year in 2009. During his time at college, Cardenas was named First Team All-West Region, Big West Midfielder of the Year and First Team All-Big West in 2013.

While at college, Cardenas appeared for USL PDL clubs Orange County Blue Star in 2012 and OC Blues Strikers and Los Angeles Misioneros in 2013.

=== Professional career ===
After going undrafted in the 2014 MLS SuperDraft, Cardenas signed with USL Pro club Orange County Blues on April 4, 2014. He is of Mexican American descent.
