= Eli Galbraith-Knapp =

American soccer player

Personal information
- Full name: Elijah Galbraith-Knapp
- Date of birth: October 12, 1991 (age 35)
- Place of birth: San Diego, California, U.S.
- Height: 1.78 m (5 ft 10 in)
- Positions: Midfielder; defender

Youth career
- San Diego Nomads

College career
Years	Team	Apps	(Gls)
2010–2013	San Diego Toreros	76	(9)

Senior career*
Years	Team	Apps	(Gls)
2012–2014	FC Tucson	25	(1)
2015	Tulsa Roughnecks	17	(1)
2016	Atletico Baja (indoor)	5	(2)
2016	North County Battalion		
2016–2019	San Diego Sockers (indoor)	5	(0)
2017–2019	San Diego Sockers 2 (indoor)	18	(13)

Managerial career
- 2017–2019: Mesa Olympians (assistant)
- 2022–: Purdue Fort Wayne Mastodons (assistant)
- * Club domestic league appearances and goals as of 15 December 2022

Elijah Galbraith-Knapp (born October 12, 1991) is an American professional soccer player who plays as a defender. Gailbraith-Knapp is currently a volunteer assistant coach for the Purdue Fort Wayne Mastodons men's soccer team and the youth technical director for Fort Wayne United SC.

== Career ==
=== Early career ===
Galbraith-Knapp played college soccer at the University of San Diego between 2010 and 2013.

Galbraith-Knapp also appeared for USL PDL club FC Tucson between 2012 and 2014.

=== Professional ===
Galbraith-Knapp signed with United Soccer League club Tulsa Roughnecks in February 2015.

Galbraith-Knapp joined the Purdue Fort Wayne Mastodons staff as a volunteer assistant in July 2022.
