= 2016 Orange County Blues FC season =

Orange County Blues FC
2016 season
- Owner: Mansouri Family
- Head Coach: Oliver Wyss
- Stadium: Anteater Stadium
- USL: Conference: 8th Overall: 15th
- USL Playoffs: Quarterfinals
- U.S. Open Cup: Second
- Top goalscorer: League: Trevin Caesar (10); All: Trevin Caesar (10)
- Average home league attendance: 1,010
Home colors	Away colors

The 2016 Orange County Blues FC season was the club's seventh season of existence, and their seventh season playing in the third tier of American soccer, USL.

Unlike the previous season, the Blues weren't as dominant in their conference, losing five more games, and only qualifying for the USL Playoffs as the eighth seed over the Portland Timbers 2 via goal difference. In the first round, the Blues had an upset over the first seeded Sacramento Republic FC, winning off of penalties, but ultimately fell to eventual finalists Swope Park Rangers in added extra time 2–1.

This season would be a season of lasts for the Blues. At the end of the season, the Mansouri Family sold the team to James Keston, who would rebrand the team to their current name, Orange County Soccer Club. Additionally, he would move the team from Anteater Stadium on the campus of UC Irvine to their own stadium, Championship Soccer Stadium.

== Roster ==
As of July 3, 2024

Note: Flags indicate national team as defined under FIFA eligibility rules; some limited exceptions apply. Players may hold more than one non-FIFA nationality.

No.	Pos.	Nation	Player
1	GK	USA	Josh Cohen
2	DF	USA	Jackson McCracken
3	DF	USA	Kwame Watson-Siriboe
4	MF	USA	Jonathan Howe
5	MF	USA	Nikola Ilich
6	DF	GER	Maurice Pluntke
7	FW	USA	Christopher Santana
9	FW	TTO	Trevin Caesar
10	MF	ENG	Richard Chaplow
11	FW	SRB	Tyler Feeley
12	DF	JAM	Andrae Campbell
13	DF	USA	Matthew Sheldon
14	FW	USA	Akwafei Ajeakwa
15	DF	USA	Ryan Felix

No.	Pos.	Nation	Player
16	MF	USA	Mats Bjurman
17	MF	FIN	Verneri Valimaa
18	MF	SRB	Dusan Stevanovic
19	MF	SRB	Ivan Mirkovic
20	DF	ESP	Oriol Cortes
21	MF	SUI	Didier Crettenand
22	MF	ARM	Gevorg Karapetyan
23	DF	JAM	Brenton Griffiths
24	MF	CAN	Andrew Gray
25	DF	USA	Steven Purdy
27	FW	ISR	Orr Barouch
33	GK	USA	Brandon Miller
37	DF	BEL	Roy Meeus
90	FW	URU	Max Rauhofer

== Competitions ==
=== United Soccer League ===
Pos	Team	Pld	W	D	L	GF	GA	GD	Pts	Qualification
6	Vancouver Whitecaps 2	30	12	9	9	44	44	0	45	Conference Playoffs
7	Oklahoma City Energy	30	10	13	7	32	30	+2	43	Conference Playoffs
8	Orange County Blues	30	12	4	14	39	41	−2	40	Conference Playoffs
9	Portland Timbers 2	30	12	4	14	38	42	−4	40	
10	San Antonio FC	30	10	8	12	36	36	0	38	

Source: 2016 USL Standings
Rules for classification: 1) total wins; 2) total goal differential; 3) total goals scored; 4) points earned against top four Conference finishers; 5) disciplinary points; 6) coin toss or drawing of lots

=== U.S. Open Cup ===
As a member of the USL, the Blues entered the U.S. Open Cup in the second round, matched up away against amateur club L.A. Wolves FC of the USASA. After losing 2–4 on penalties after a 1–1 draw in open play, the Blues' loss marked the third time in a row the Blues lost to an amateur club in the U.S. Open Cup.

May 18 Second Round	L.A. Wolves FC (USASA) (California)	1–1 (a.e.t.) (4–2 p)	Orange County Blues FC (USL) (California)	Wilmington, California
8:00 PM PDT	Sánchez 72'	Report	Howe 77'	Stadium: Phineas Banning High School; Referee: Vincent Apple-Chiarella
