= Davy Armstrong =

American-Cambodian soccer player

Personal information
- Full name: Davy Lee Armstrong
- Date of birth: November 3, 1991 (age 34)
- Place of birth: Aurora, Colorado, United States
- Height: 5 ft 11 in (1.80 m)
- Position: Defensive midfielder

Youth career
- 2007–2010: Colorado Rapids

Senior career*
Years	Team	Apps	(Gls)
2010–2014	Colorado Rapids	3	(0)
2013	→ Phoenix FC (loan)	2	(0)
2015–2017	Colorado Springs Switchbacks	48	(0)
- * Club domestic league appearances and goals as of October 16, 2017

Davy Armstrong (born November 3, 1991) is an American-Cambodian former soccer player.

== Career ==
=== Youth ===
Armstrong was born and raised in Aurora, Colorado, the youngest of four children to Ri and Laura Armstrong. His father was originally from Cambodia but came to the United States during the Vietnam War.

He played soccer at Rangeview High School where he was named the 2008 Denver Post All-Colorado player of the year and was a three-time All-Colorado team selection from 2007-09. He also led his club team – Rapids adidas Alliance partner, the Colorado Fusion – to the 2005 Colorado state championship.

He entered the Colorado Rapids youth system in 2007, playing with the team's U-17 and U-18 squads.

=== Colorado Rapids ===
Armstrong signed a contract with the Colorado Rapids on Aug. 16, 2010. He was identified by the club as a homegrown player – an initiative established by Major League Soccer to allow clubs to develop their own youth players without exposing them to the MLS SuperDraft. Davy made his debut against Metapan in El Salvador in a 3-1 victory for Colorado Rapids, coming on as a substitute for Eddie Ababio.

=== Phoenix FC ===
On August 1, 2013, Armstrong was loaned to third-tier Phoenix FC for the remainder of their USL Pro season.

=== Colorado Springs Switchbacks FC ===
On February 4, 2015 it was announced that Armstrong was going start playing for USL Pro team Colorado Springs Switchbacks FC, he was the 10th player announced for the Colorado Springs Switchbacks FC

Armstrong played 23 games for the Colorado Springs Switchbacks FC in his first season with the club, and recorded 2 assist.

On January 20, 2016 it was announced that Armstrong re-signed to the Colorado Springs Switchbacks FC for the 2016 USL Pro season.

=== International ===
In 2011, Armstrong was identified by the Football Federation of Cambodia as a foreign-born player who could potentially be called for the Cambodia national team. He qualifies through his Cambodian father who immigrated to the United States during the Vietnam War.

== Personal life ==
In 2020, Armstrong began a career as a firefighter in Colorado.
