= Phoenix FC =

- Full name: Phoenix Football Club
- Nickname: Wolves
- Founded: July 2, 2012; 13 years ago
- Dissolved: March 12, 2014; 12 years ago
- Stadium: Sun Devil Soccer Stadium; Tempe, Arizona
- Capacity: 3,400
- Owners: BDR Sports LLC
- Head Coach: David Robertson
- League: USL Pro
Home colors	Away colors

Phoenix FC was an American professional soccer team based in Phoenix. The team was a member of the USL Professional Division, the third tier of the American Soccer Pyramid. The team's colors were red and white.

== History ==
On June 18, 2012, BDR Sports LLC was incorporated in the State of Arizona to bring a professional soccer team to Phoenix. On July 2, 2012, the USL Pro awarded a franchise to the BDR group for the 2013 season. On July 15, the team announced they had hired David Robertson, Director of Boy's Coaching at Sereno Soccer Club, as head coach. He is a former Rangers, Aberdeen and Leeds United player. He also managed Elgin City and Montrose in the Scottish Third Division. The team name ("Phoenix City FC") and colors were announced the same day. On August 28, the team selected Umbro as the team's official football uniform and equipment supplier. On September 7, the team renamed itself "Phoenix FC", introduced its logo and selected "Wolves" as their nickname.

On September 27, 2012, former Aberdeen striker Darren Mackie signed a one-year contract with Phoenix FC, becoming their first player signing.

On December 11, 2012, Phoenix FC and Arizona State University announced a stadium agreement for 2013. Phoenix FC would play home games at Sun Devil Soccer Stadium beginning in April 2013. As part of the deal, the seating capacity was meant to be expanded by more than 4,000 additional seats, taking the total capacity to over 5,000 seats. However, due to the position of stadium lights poles on the east side of the stadium, the capacity was revised to just over 3,400.

=== 2013 season ===
Phoenix FC opened their only season with a 2–0 loss to the Los Angeles Blues on March 23, 2013. They won their home opener at Sun Devil Soccer Stadium on March 30, 2013. They defeated VSI Tampa Bay FC 1–0 on a goal by Netinho before a sold-out, standing room crowd of 4,198.

The team finished the 2013 season with 5 wins, 14 losses and 7 ties. Donny Toia lead the team in scoring with six goals and was a nominee for USL Pro Rookie of the Year.

=== Demise ===
USL Pro revoked the Phoenix franchise rights from BDR Sports LLC on November 1, 2013, citing multiple violations of the franchise agreement, such as failing to pay its players on time and submitting misleading and inaccurate financial statements. On December 16, 2013, USL Pro awarded the franchise rights for Phoenix FC to American Soccer Marketing LLC, owned by former interim team president Tim Donald. On March 12, 2014, American Soccer Marketing announced that it could not continue operating the team in the USL Pro league. They were replaced with Arizona United SC (now Phoenix Rising FC) the next day.

== Year-by-year ==
Year	Division	League	Regular season (W–L–T)	Playoffs	U.S. Open Cup	Avg. attendance	Top goalscorer	
2013	3	USL Pro	12th Place (5–14–7)	did not qualify	First round	1,532	(United States) Donny Toia	6

== Players ==
=== Roster ===
No.	Position	Nation	Player
0	GK	MEX	Lalo Fernández
1	GK	USA	Andrew Weber
2	MF	USA	Reid Schmitt
3	DF	SCO	Scott Morrison
4	DF	USA	Devon Grousis
5	DF	BRA	Renan Boufleur
6	MF	GHA	Anthony Obodai
7	MF	USA	David Paul
8	MF	BRA	Netinho
9	MF	BRA	Diego Faria
10	FW	SCO	Darren Mackie
11	DF	CMR	Cyprian Hedrick
13	GK	JAM	Sheldon Parkinson
14	FW	USA	Aaron King
15	DF	MEX	José Ramos
16	DF	USA	Isaiah Schafer
17	DF	USA	Brian Holmes
18	MF	USA	Thomas Ramos
19	DF	USA	Elliot Weber
20	GK	USA	Neal Kitson
21	MF	USA	Josh Bento
22	MF	USA	Cameron Vickers
23	FW	USA	Peabo Doue
25	FW	USA	Donny Toia
26	GK	USA	Humberto Soriano
27	FW	USA	Travis Bowen
28	FW	USA	Davy Armstrong (on loan from Colorado Rapids)
29	FW	USA	Roberto Valadez
30	GK	CPV	Sócrates Oliveira Fonseca
32	DF	USA	Robert Clayton Zelin III
33	DF	USA	Chad Newman
—	FW	USA	Will Bates (on loan from Seattle Sounders FC)

== Front Office ==
- (United States) Tim Donald – President
- (United States) Eric Cornwall – Chairman
- (Portugal) Rui Filipe Bento – General Manager
- (United States) Shawn Dietrich – Director of Operations
- (Scotland) David Robertson – Head Coach

== Stadiums ==
- Sun Devil Soccer Stadium (2013 – 9 games)
- GCU Soccer Stadium (2013 – 1 game)
- Reach 11 Soccer Complex (2013 – 3 games)
