= Anthony Obodai =

Ghanaian former professional footballer (born 1982)

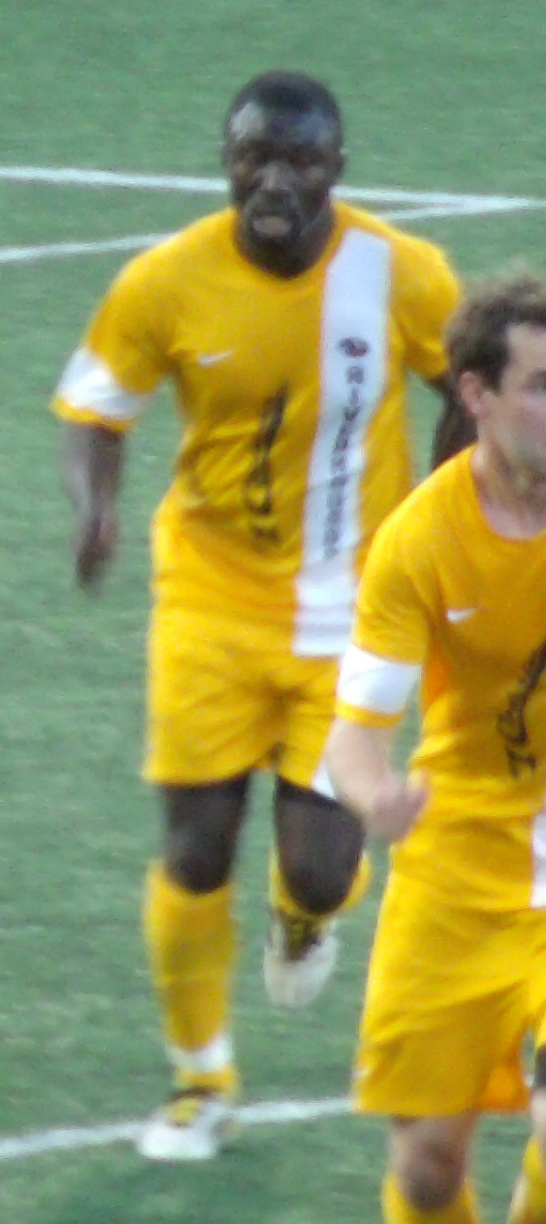
- Obodai with the Pittsburgh Riverhounds in 2014

Personal information
- Date of birth: 6 August 1982 (age 44)
- Place of birth: Accra, Ghana
- Position: Midfielder

Senior career*
Years	Team	Apps	(Gls)
2000–2001	Liberty Professionals		
2001–2005	Ajax	21	(2)
2002–2003	→ Germinal Beerschot (loan)	29	(2)
2005–2007	Sparta Rotterdam	47	(1)
2007–2010	RKC Waalwijk	88	(5)
2010	Houston Dynamo	4	(0)
2012	Mağusa Türk Gücü	13	(2)
2013	Phoenix FC	24	(0)
2014	Pittsburgh Riverhounds	16	(0)
2015	Ånge	24	(3)

International career^{‡}
1999	Ghana U17	6	(1)
2001	Ghana U20	3	(0)
2003–2005	Ghana	4	(0)
- * Club domestic league appearances and goals as of September 16, 2014 ‡ National team caps and goals as of September 16, 2014

Anthony Obodai (born 6 August 1982) is a Ghanaian former professional footballer who played as a midfielder.

== Career ==
=== Club career ===
Born in Accra, Obodai began his career with local team Liberty Professionals in 2000. He signed for Dutch team Ajax in 2001, playing on loan at Belgian side Germinal Beerschot during the 2002–03 season. In August 2005 a move to English side Luton Town collapsed, and Obodai moved to Sparta Rotterdam two days later. Obodai was made club captain at Sparta, but asked to leave the club in January 2007, signing for RKC Waalwijk on 31 January 2007. During his time in the Netherlands and Belgium, Obodai made nearly 200 appearances.

Obodai was signed by Houston Dynamo of Major League Soccer in July 2010, making four appearances before being released at the end of the season.

In January 2012 he signed a contract at Birinci Lig side Mağusa Türk Gücü in Northern Cyprus.

In February 2013, Obodai signed for Phoenix FC of the USL Pro, the third division of the United States soccer pyramid. In his first season with the club, Obodai made 24 appearances and tallied one assist. When Phoenix FC faced financial difficulty after its first season of existence, Obodai signed for the Pittsburgh Riverhounds, also of the USL Pro, on 7 November 2013.

In January 2015 he signed with Ånge in the Swedish Division 2. He left the club after the season.

=== International career ===
Obodai played at the 1999 FIFA U-17 World Championship and the 2001 FIFA World Youth Championship. He also earned four senior caps for Ghana between 2003 and 2005.
