= 2012 Los Angeles Blues season =

Los Angeles Blues
2012 season
- Owners: (United States) Ali Mansouri (United States) Maryam Mansouri
- Head coach: (United States) Charlie Naimo
- Stadium: Titan Stadium
- USL Pro: 8th
- USL Pro Playoffs: DNQ
- U.S. Open Cup: Second round
Home colors	Away colors

The 2012 Los Angeles Blues season was the club's second year of existence, their second year in USL Pro, the third division of the American soccer pyramid.

== Background ==
After a 7th overall finish in 2011 and an exit in the first round of the Playoffs, the Blues retained few players from 2011 onto the 2012. Coach Naimo retained only Carlos Borja, Israel Sesay, Erlys Garcia and Amir Abedzadeh.

The Blues also announced the hiring of Steve Donner (formerly CEO of Orlando City) as vice president of business operations to focus on better marketing of the club and to bring professionalism to the front-office. The first game of the 2012 season reflected these efforts with a 2,432 attendance compared to 696 for the first home game in 2011 (the Blues averaged 382 during the 2011 season).

== Competitions ==
=== Preseason ===
February 3, 2012	LA Galaxy	7–2	LA Blues	Carson, California
10:00 PST	Sarvas 12' (pen.); Dunivant 28'; Cristman 36', 45'; Cardozo 42'; McBean 63'; Nakazawa 84'	Report	Russell (yellow card) 17'; Cho 30'; Fondy 84' (pen.)	Stadium: The Home Depot Center

=== USL Pro regular season ===
==== Standings ====
Pos	Team	Pld	W	T	L	GF	GA	GD	Pts	Qualification
1	Orlando City SC (C)	24	17	6	1	50	18	+32	57	Commissioner's Cup, Playoffs 1st round bye
2	Rochester Rhinos (A)	24	12	5	7	27	23	+4	41	Playoffs 1st round bye
3	Charleston Battery (A)	24	12	2	10	36	26	+10	38	Playoffs
4	Richmond Kickers (A)	24	11	5	8	31	27	+4	38	Playoffs
5	Wilmington Hammerheads (A)	24	10	7	7	34	32	+2	37	Playoffs
6	Harrisburg City Islanders (A)	24	10	7	7	34	29	+5	37	Playoffs
7	Charlotte Eagles	24	11	3	10	34	26	+8	36	
8	Los Angeles Blues	24	9	3	12	26	29	−3	30	
9	Dayton Dutch Lions	24	4	10	10	20	29	−9	22	
10	Pittsburgh Riverhounds	24	4	5	15	20	39	−19	17	
11	Antigua Barracuda	24	5	1	18	16	50	−34	16	

Source: USL Pro official standings
Rules for classification: Points, then tiebreak: 1) Head-to-head record based on total points in League games, 2) Total wins in League games, 3) Goal difference in League games, 4) Goals scored in League games, etc.
(A) Advances to USL Pro Playoffs; (C) Commissioner's Cup (best regular season record)

=== U.S. Open Cup ===
May 22	Ventura County Fusion (California)	3−1 (a.e.t.)	(California) Los Angeles Blues	Fullerton, CA
5:00 PDT	López 35' (pen.) 107'; Bowen 116'	Report	14' (o.g.) Pontius	Stadium: Hal Sherbeck Field House

== See also ==
- 2012 in American soccer
