= Neal Kitson =

American soccer player (born 1986)

Personal information
- Full name: Neal Kitson
- Date of birth: January 6, 1986 (age 40)
- Place of birth: Queens, New York, United States
- Height: 6 ft 2 in (1.88 m)
- Position: Goalkeeper

Youth career
- 2004: Dowling Golden Lions
- 2005–2008: St. John's Red Storm

Senior career*
Years	Team	Apps	(Gls)
2008	Newark Ironbound Express	5	(0)
2010–2011	Rochester Rhinos	43	(1)
2012	Northampton Town	8	(0)
2013	Jersey Express	5	(0)
2013	Phoenix FC	6	(0)
Total		67	(1)
- * Club domestic league appearances and goals

Neal Kitson (born January 6, 1986, in Queens, New York) is an American soccer player.

== Career ==
=== College and amateur ===
Kitson attended Benjamin N. Cardozo High School, where he won the PSAL Heisman Wingate Award and was selected to the Newsday All-City first team in 2003, before beginning his college soccer career at Dowling College.

He transferred to St. John's University as a sophomore, redshirting his first season with the team, but went on to become the team's first choice goalkeeper after his junior year in 2007. In his senior campaign he set a school record by recording 15 shutouts in 24 starts, and was instrumental in helping the Red Storm to a No.4 ranking in the 2008 NSCAA/Adidas polls, winning the Big East regular season title, and qualifying for the NCAA College Cup for only the fourth time in the school's history.

During his college years he also played for Newark Ironbound Express in the USL Premier Development League.

=== Professional ===
Kitson was drafted in the third round (42nd overall) of the 2009 MLS SuperDraft by Kansas City Wizards but was not offered a professional contract by the team after doctors in Kansas diagnosed him with a sports hernia, a fractured pelvis, and a torn labrum in his hip.

After spending much of 2009 recuperating, Kitson signed his first professional contract in 2010 when he signed with Rochester Rhinos. He made his professional debut on April 28, 2010, in a game against NSC Minnesota Stars.

Kitson became of the few goalkeepers to score a goal when he netted a 90th-minute equalizer for the Rhinos in a 2–2 tie with Antigua Barracuda FC on June 5, 2011.

Rochester re-signed Kitson for the 2012 season on November 3, 2011. However, in late January 2012 he exercised an escape clause in his contract and signed with Northampton Town of the English Football League Two on a free transfer.

He made his debut on 31 March against Crewe Alexandra, and with the scores tied at one each, saved a stoppage time penalty to secure a draw. In his second match on 6 April, Kitson again saved a penalty during Northampton's 2–1 win over Oxford United.

He had his contract with the club terminated and returned home for personal family reasons in August 2012.

== Honors ==
=== Rochester Rhinos ===
- USSF Division 2 Pro League Regular Season Champions (1): 2010
