= Sun Devil Soccer Stadium =

Sports venue at ASU in Tempe, Arizona

Sun Devil Soccer/Lacrosse Stadium
- Interactive map of Sun Devil Soccer/Lacrosse Stadium
- Address: 655 S. Athletes Place; Tempe, AZ; United States
- Coordinates: 33.4246°N 111.9219°W
- Owner: Arizona State University
- Operator: Arizona State Univ. Athletics
- Capacity: 1,051
- Type: Stadium
- Surface: Grass
- Current use: Soccer; Lacrosse
- Public transit: Valley Metro Rail

Construction
- Opened: April 1, 2000; 26 years ago

Tenants
- Arizona State Sun Devils (NCAA) teams: women's soccer (2000–present); women's lacrosse; Professional teams: Phoenix FC (USL PRO) (2013)

Website
- thesundevils.com/soccer-lacrosse-stadium

Sun Devil Soccer/Lacrosse Stadium is a stadium on the campus of Arizona State University in Tempe, Arizona. It is home to the Arizona State Sun Devils women's soccer and women's lacrosse teams. The stadium opened in 2000 and features chair-back bleachers and individual seats with a capacity for 1,051 fans.

On December 11, 2012, Phoenix FC and Arizona State Sun Devils announced a stadium agreement for the 2013 season. As part of the deal, the seating capacity was expanded by more than 2,500 additional seats, taking the total capacity to 3,400 seats.

The temporary stands, rented from the Phoenix Open Golf Tournament, were returned on July 2. The Stadium went back to its original capacity of 1,051 seats. The agreement was not renewed after the season ended.
