= Charley Pettys =

Filipino football player

Personal information
- Full name: Charles Danforth Pettys
- Date of birth: April 25, 1990 (age 36)
- Place of birth: Columbus, Ohio, United States
- Height: 5 ft 11 in (1.80 m)
- Position: Defender

Team information
- Current team: Global
- Number: 37

Youth career
- Blast FC

College career
| Years | Team | Apps | (Gls) |
| 2009 | UC Santa Barbara Gauchos | 5 | (0) |
| 2010–2012 | Kentucky Wildcats | 33 | (10) |

Senior career*
| Years | Team | Apps | (Gls) |
| 2008 | Cincinnati Kings | 9 | (0) |
| 2010–2011 | Orange County Blue Star | 10 | (1) |
| 2013 | Los Angeles Blues | 16 | (0) |
| 2014 | Global F.C. | 27 | (7) |
| 2015–2016 | PSA Elite | 15 | (3) |
| 2016 | Global F.C. | 8 | (2) |

International career
| 2014 | Philippines | 1 | (0) |
- * Club domestic league appearances and goals

Charles Danforth Pettys (born April 25, 1990) is a former professional footballer who last played as a defender for Global F.C. Born in the United States, he represented the Philippines national football team in one senior international match.

== Early life and education ==
Born on April 25, 1990, in Columbus, Ohio, to an American father and Filipino mother, Pettys attended Bexley High School where he was a member of their soccer team. Pettys and family moved to Pasadena, California, in 2008.

Pettys attended the University of California, Santa Barbara in 2009 and was a student-athlete on the UC Santa Barbara Gauchos men's soccer team. He appeared for the Gauchos in 5 games without recording a point before transferring to play on the Kentucky Wildcats men's soccer team.

== Playing career ==
Pettys played with Cincinnati Kings for the 2008 PDL season before attending college, appearing in 9 games for the Kings. He later played with Orange County Blue Star for the 2010 PDL season and the 2011 PDL season.

Pettys began his professional career with Los Angeles Blues of the USL Pro in 2013. In January 2014, he joined Filipino side Global F.C., a first division team in the UFL.

Pettys rejoined Global F.C. in 2016.

=== International career ===
Pettys, being eligible to represent both the United States (via birth) and the Philippines (via heritage on his mother's side), chose to join the Philippines national football team after being invited to the national team pool in February 2014 by head coach Thomas Dooley. He made his international debut as a substitute in a 3–0 win over Nepal in Doha, Qatar on April 11, 2014. His full international cap was the first by a Kentucky Wildcats player.
