= Sergio Valle-Ortiz =

American soccer player

Personal information
- Full name: Sergio Valle-Ortiz
- Date of birth: January 16, 1988 (age 38)
- Place of birth: San Diego, California, United States
- Position: Forward

Senior career*
Years	Team	Apps	(Gls)
2011–2015	San Diego Flash		
2013–2014	Los Angeles Blues	8	(1)
2016–	North County Battalion		
- * Club domestic league appearances and goals

Sergio Valle-Ortiz (born January 16, 1988) is an American soccer player.

== Career ==
=== Los Angeles Blues ===
After playing for the San Diego Flash of the National Premier Soccer League for the 2012 season Valle-Ortiz signed for the Los Angeles Blues. He then made his debut for the team on 23 March 2013 against Phoenix FC in which he came on in the 81st minute for Chris Cortez as the Blues went on to win 2–0.

== Career statistics ==
=== Club ===
Statistics accurate as of 26 March 2013

Club	Season	League		US Open Cup		Other		CONCACAF		Total	
Club	Season	Apps	Goals	Apps	Goals	Apps	Goals	Apps	Goals	Apps	Goals
Los Angeles Blues	2013	8	0	0	0	0	0	—	—	8	1
Career total		8	0	0	0	0	0	0	0	8	1
