= Aaron King =

American soccer player (born 1984)

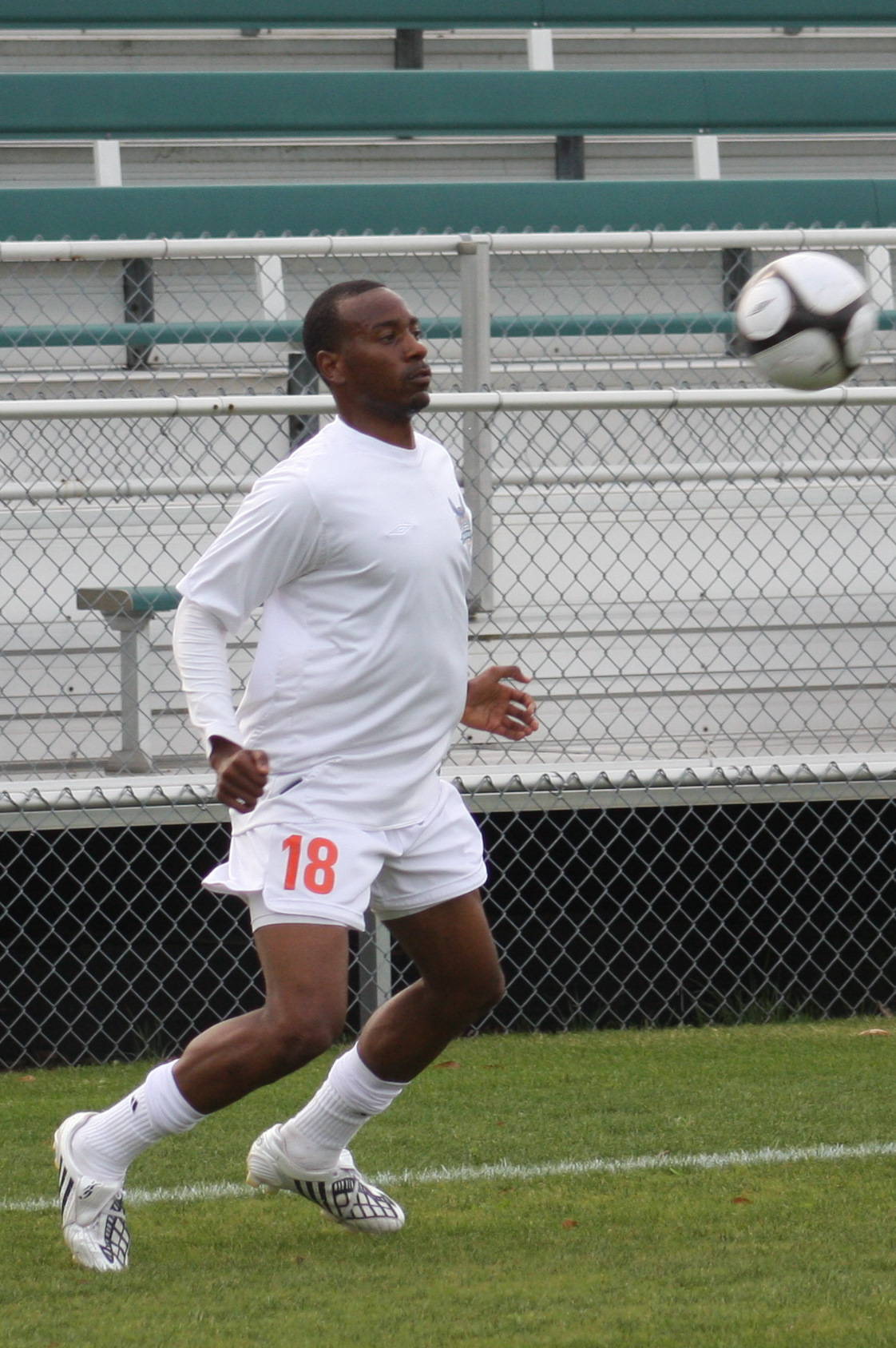

Personal information
- Full name: Aaron King
- Date of birth: July 26, 1984 (age 42)
- Place of birth: Denver, Colorado, United States
- Height: 6 ft 1 in (1.85 m)
- Position: Forward

College career
Years	Team	Apps	(Gls)
2002–2005	NC State Wolfpack		

Senior career*
Years	Team	Apps	(Gls)
2004	Boulder Rapids Reserve	7	(4)
2005	Raleigh CASL Elite	7	(10)
2006	Colorado Rapids	0	(0)
2007–2008	Charleston Battery	51	(11)
2009	Carolina RailHawks	2	(0)
2009	→ Wilmington Hammerheads (loan)	4	(1)
2009	Miami FC	5	(3)
2010–2011	FC Tampa Bay	56	(21)
2013	Phoenix FC	14	(2)
2013	FC Haka	8	(1)
2014	Carolina RailHawks	14	(0)
2015–2017	Colorado Springs Switchbacks	68	(14)
- * Club domestic league appearances and goals as of October 16, 2017

Aaron King (born July 26, 1984, in Denver, Colorado) is an American former professional soccer player.

== Career ==
=== Youth and amateur ===
King attended South High School and Smoky Hill High School where he won the 2000 Colorado State Soccer Championship. He then attended the North Carolina State University, playing on the men's soccer team from 2002 to 2005. During his four years at NC State, he scored forty-four and added fifteen assists. He was a 2005 second team All American.

In 2004, King played with the Boulder Rapids Reserve in the fourth division Premier Development League during the collegiate off season. In 2005, he played with the Raleigh CASL Elite.

=== Professional ===
In 2006, the Virginia Beach Mariners selected King with the 15th pick in the USL First Division College Draft. On January 20, 2006, the Los Angeles Galaxy picked King in the fourth round (forty-eighth overall) in the 2006 MLS SuperDraft. King chose to sign with the Galaxy. On February 8, 2006, the Galaxy sent King to the Colorado Rapids in exchange for a first round pick in the 2007 MLS Supplemental Draft. He never saw a first team game, but played ten games, scoring two goals, with the Colorado Rapids reserve team. On November 21, 2006, the Rapids waived King.

In the spring of 2007, the Charleston Battery signed King after he impressed the team at trials. He spent two seasons in Charleston, scoring twenty-one goals in fifty-one games. On January 30, 2009, King signed with the Carolina RailHawks. He suffered several injuries during the season which kept him out of most first team games. On April 24, 2009, he was sent on loan to the Wilmington Hammerheads of the USL Second Division where he injured his ankle. On August 31, 2009, the RailHawks sent him on a free transfer to Miami FC.

=== FC Tampa Bay ===
King signed with the FC Tampa Bay of the new USSF Division 2, and scored the first goal in the team's history on April 16, 2010, in a 1–0 win over Crystal Palace Baltimore. King signed a new contract with the club, which moved to the North American Soccer League, on February 8, 2011. He spent the 2011 season with Tampa Bay. On October 5, 2011, the club declined its 2012 contract option for King, making him a free agent.

=== Phoenix FC ===
King signed with Phoenix FC of the USL Pro for the 2013 season on November 19, 2012. King then asked for his release from Phoenix FC in June 2013. In July, King then went on trial with FC Haka for three weeks before signing a contract with club. King then went on to score on his debut with Haka FC against AC Oulu only four minutes after he was substituted into the match to make the score 2–0, and to help Haka confirm a 4–0 victory over AC Oulu.

=== Colorado Springs Switchbacks FC ===
King signed with USL Pro team Colorado Springs Switchbacks for the 2015 season. King ended his first season with the Colorado Springs Switchbacks with 7 goals and 2 assist.

On January 13, 2016, that King had resigned with Colorado Springs Switchbacks for the 2016 USL Pro season. On March 15, 2016, King scored in a 4-0 preseason victory against Ventura County Fusion.

== Coaching career ==
King continues to coach in the greater Denver area with the private coaching service, CoachUp.
