= Netinho (footballer, born 1993) =

Brazilian footballer

Personal information
- Full name: João Inácio de Jesus Cerqueira
- Date of birth: 4 November 1993 (age 32)
- Place of birth: Feira de Santana, Brazil
- Height: 1.64 m (5 ft 5 in)
- Position: Midfielder

Youth career
- 2007–2013: Santos

Senior career*
Years	Team	Apps	(Gls)
2013	Phoenix FC	24	(2)
- * Club domestic league appearances and goals as of August 28, 2013

João Inácio de Jesus Cerqueira (born 4 November 1993 in Feira de Santana, Bahia), known as Netinho, is a Brazilian footballer.

== Career ==
=== Phoenix ===
After spending his youth career with Santos FC in the Brazilian Serie A since the age of 14, Netinho signed for Phoenix FC of the USL Pro for their inaugural season on 5 February 2013. Then on 23 March 2013 Netinho made his debut for the franchise in their first ever game against the Los Angeles Blues in which he played the full game as Phoenix lost the match 2–0. On the following matchday, Netinho scored the first goal in Phoenix FC history, the game-winner in a 1–0 victory over VSI Tampa Bay FC.

== Career statistics ==
=== Club ===
Statistics accurate as of August 28, 2013

Club	Season	League		US Open Cup		Other		CONCACAF		Total	
Club	Season	Apps	Goals	Apps	Goals	Apps	Goals	Apps	Goals	Apps	Goals
Phoenix	2013	24	2	0	0	0	0	—	—	24	2
Career total		24	2	0	0	0	0	—	—	24	2
