= Óscar Dautt =

Mexican footballer (born 1976)

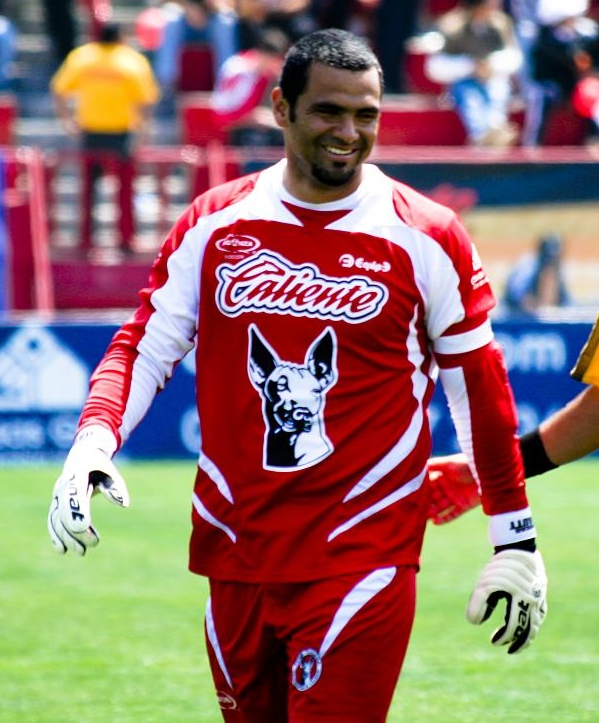
- Dautt playing for Tijuana

Personal information
- Full name: Óscar Manuel Dautt Bojórquez
- Date of birth: 8 June 1976 (age 50)
- Place of birth: Guasave, Sinaloa, Mexico
- Height: 1.84 m (6 ft 0 in)
- Position: Goalkeeper

Team information
- Current team: Tijuana (Goalkeeping coach)

Senior career*
Years	Team	Apps	(Gls)
1998	Monterrey	24	(0)
1999–2000	Toros Neza	48	(0)
2000–2001	Puebla	37	(0)
2001–2003	Tigres UANL	63	(0)
2003–2005	Puebla	70	(0)
2006	BUAP	18	(0)
2007–2008	Tijuana	32	(0)
2008–2009	Puebla	10	(0)
2009	→ BUAP (loan)		
2011–2012	Los Angeles Blues	21	(0)

Managerial career
- 2015–2022: Tijuana (Goalkeeping coach)
- 2023: Mexico (goalkeeping coach)
- 2024–: Tijuana (Goalkeeping coach)
- * Club domestic league appearances and goals

Óscar Manuel Dautt Bojórquez (Note: In this Spanish name, the first or paternal surname is Dautt and the second or maternal family name is Bojórquez.) (born 8 June 1976) is a Mexican former professional footballer who played as a goalkeeper.

== Career ==
=== Club ===
Once considered among Mexico's most promising young goalkeepers, Dautt played regularly in the Liga MX between 1998 and 2008, enjoying successful stints with Monterrey, Toros Neza, Puebla, Tigres UANL and Tijuana FC, before losing his place with Puebla during the 2009 Clausura campaign. He played the 2009 Apertura campaign with Lobos BUAP in Mexico's second-tier Liga de Ascenso, before being released at the end of the season.

In December 2010 Dautt signed with the expansion Los Angeles Blues of the new USL Professional League.

=== International ===
Dautt was named to the Mexico national team for the 2001 FIFA Confederations Cup, but he has never been featured in any of the games.
