= Tomislav Colić =

Serbian footballer

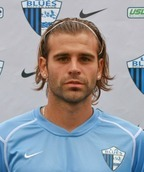
- Colić in Los Angeles Blues kit, 2011

Personal information
- Full name: Tomislav Colić
- Date of birth: October 13, 1987 (age 39)
- Place of birth: Inđija, SFR Yugoslavia
- Height: 6 ft 0 in (1.83 m)
- Position: Midfielder

Youth career
- 2005–2007: Vojvodina

College career
Years	Team	Apps	(Gls)
2007–2010	Vanguard Lions		

Senior career*
Years	Team	Apps	(Gls)
2008–2009	Southern California Seahorses	27	(4)
2010	Vermont Voltage	11	(5)
2011	Los Angeles Blues	15	(2)
2011–12	Anaheim Bolts	13	(16)
- * Club domestic league appearances and goals as of November 15, 2012

Tomislav Colić (Serbian Cyrillic: Томислав Цолић; born October 13, 1987) is a Serbian footballer formerly with Los Angeles Blues in the USL Professional Division and Anaheim Bolts in the Professional Arena Soccer League.

== Career ==
=== Youth and amateur ===
Colić played for the youth team of Serbian SuperLiga club FK Vojvodina, and came to the United States in 2007 after being offered a college soccer scholarship at Vanguard University of Southern California in Costa Mesa, California. He was an NAIA All-American Honorable Mention in 2008, NAIA Second-Team All-American in 2009 and garnered All-GSAC recognition in each of his first three years at Vanguard.

During his college years Colić also played in the USL Premier Development League for the Southern California Seahorses and Vermont Voltage. In 2009, Colić was named to the USL Premier Development League All-Western Conference Team.

=== Professional ===
Colić turned professional when he signed with the expansion Los Angeles Blues of the new USL Professional League in February 2011. He made his professional debut on April 15, 2011 in a 3-0 victory over Sevilla Puerto Rico, and scored his first two professional goals on April 20, in a 4-2 win over Puerto Rico United. At the completion of his rookie season in the USL, Colić signed with the Anaheim Bolts in November 2011. He scored 16 goals in 13 appearances for the Bolts, earning a spot in the PASL Top 20 Scoring Leaders for the 2011-12 season.
