= Joe Sofia =

American soccer player

Personal information
- Full name: Joseph Anthony Sofia, Jr.
- Date of birth: October 8, 1991 (age 35)
- Place of birth: Mission Viejo, California, United States
- Height: 6 ft 2 in (1.88 m)
- Position: Defender

Youth career
- 2006–2009: Irvine Strikers
- 2010–2013: UCLA Bruins

Senior career*
Years	Team	Apps	(Gls)
2011–2012	Orange County Blue Star	14	(1)
2013	Ventura County Fusion	3	(0)
2014	San Jose Earthquakes	0	(0)
2014	→ Orange County Blues (loan)	5	(0)
- * Club domestic league appearances and goals as of May 21, 2014

Joseph Anthony Sofia Jr. (born October 8, 1991) is an American soccer player.

== Career ==
=== College and amateur ===
Sofia spent his entire college career at UCLA. He made a total of 82 appearances with the Bruins and tallied 5 goals and 8 assists.

During his time in college, Sofia also played in the USL Premier Development League for Orange County Blue Star and Ventura County Fusion.

=== Professional ===
On January 16, 2014, Sofia was drafted in the second round of the 2014 MLS SuperDraft (28th overall) by San Jose Earthquakes. He signed with the club two months later.

On May 18, 2014, Sofia joined USL Pro club Orange County Blues FC on loan and made his professional debut in a 1–0 defeat to the Sounders FC Reserves in a USL Pro-MLS Reserve interleague match.

Sofia was waived by San Jose on July 2, 2014.
