= Peabo Doue =

American soccer player

Personal information
- Full name: Moer Yhan De Doue
- Date of birth: December 28, 1991 (age 34)
- Place of birth: Takoma Park, Maryland, United States
- Height: 1.78 m (5 ft 10 in)
- Position: Left back

Youth career
- 2008–2009: D.C. United

College career
Years	Team	Apps	(Gls)
2009–2012	West Virginia Mountaineers	75	(10)

Senior career*
Years	Team	Apps	(Gls)
2013	Phoenix FC	18	(1)
2014–2015	Oklahoma City Energy	50	(2)
2016	Wilmington Hammerheads	20	(1)
2017	Jacksonville Armada	4	(0)
2018	North Carolina FC	19	(1)
2019–2020	Loudoun United	33	(0)
Total		144	(5)
- * Club domestic league appearances and goals as of September 25, 2020

Moer Yhan "Peabo" De Doue (born December 28, 1991) is an American former soccer player who played as a defender.

== Career ==
=== Early career ===
Doue began playing youth soccer for MSC United, coached by Julio Arjona. He also spent three seasons playing for Bethesda SC Roadrunners. Doue started out as a three-year varsity starter at Clarksburg High School in which he scored 44 goals while captaining the school team for his junior and senior years. While attended High-School Doue also played for the D.C. United Academy for which he was a 2008 MLS U-17 Cup finalist for. In 2009, he attended West Virginia University where he stayed until 2012.

=== Phoenix ===
On March 13, 2013, it was announced that Doue had signed with new USL Pro franchise Phoenix FC for the season. Then on March 23, 2013, he made his debut for the team against Los Angeles Blues in their first game ever in which the team lost 2–0.

=== Oklahoma City Energy ===
On February 18, 2014 Oklahoma City Energy FC of the USL Pro announced the signing of Peabo Doue. He made his debut against Orange County Blues on April 6, 2014, in which he assisted a goal in a 2–0 victory for the Energy.

=== Wilmington Hammerheads ===
After two seasons with Oklahoma City, Doue signed with USL club Wilmington Hammerheads.

=== Jacksonville Armada ===
On January 30, 2017, Doue signed with North American Soccer League side Jacksonville Armada.

=== North Carolina FC ===
On January 4, 2018, Doue signed with USL side North Carolina FC.

Upon signing with North Carolina FC he appeared on the popular podcast Raleigh City Sports.

=== Loudoun United ===
On February 26, 2019, Doue signed with USL Championship side Loudoun United FC. He was re-signed by Loudoun on January 7, 2020.

Doue announced his retirement from playing professionally on September 25, 2020.

== Career statistics ==
=== Club ===
Statistics accurate as of November 1, 2019

Club	Season	League		US Open Cup		Other		CONCACAF		Total	
Club	Season	Apps	Goals	Apps	Goals	Apps	Goals	Apps	Goals	Apps	Goals
Phoenix FC	2013	17	1	1	0	0	0	-	-	18	1
Oklahoma City Energy FC	2014	26	1	2	0	0	0	-	-	28	1
Oklahoma City Energy FC	2015	19	1	3	0	0	0	-	-	22	1
Wilmington Hammerheads	2016	18	1	2	0	0	0	-	-	20	1
Jacksonville Armada	2017	3	0	1	0	0	0	-	-	4	0
North Carolina FC	2018	17	1	2	0	0	0	-	-	19	1
Loudoun United	2019	23	0	0	0	0	0	-	-	23	0
Loudoun United	2020	10	0	-	-	0	0	-	-	10	0
