= Cyprian Hedrick =

Cameroonian footballer

Personal information
- Date of birth: October 6, 1989 (age 37)
- Place of birth: Douala, Cameroon
- Height: 6 ft 0 in (1.83 m)
- Position: Defender

College career
Years	Team	Apps	(Gls)
2007–2008	San Jacinto Gators		
2009–2011	Coastal Carolina Chanticleers	37	(2)

Senior career*
Years	Team	Apps	(Gls)
2009–2011	Fresno Fuego	36	(6)
2012	Sporting Kansas City	0	(0)
2013	Phoenix FC	24	(0)
2014–2016	Oklahoma City Energy	74	(0)
2017–2018	San Antonio FC	36	(1)
2019–2020	FC Tulsa	35	(1)
Total		205	(8)

Managerial career
- 2015–2016: Norman North Timberwolves (assistant)
- 2019–2021: Bixby Spartans (assistant)
- 2021–2022: Victory Christian Conquerors
- 2022: FC Tulsa (assistant)
- 2023: Tulsa SC WPSL
- * Club domestic league appearances and goals as of January 8, 2023

Cyprian Hedrick (born 6 October 1989) is a former Cameroonian footballer and coach.

== Career ==
Hedrick played his college career at both San Jacinto College and Coastal Carolina University between 2007 and 2011. During this time he also appeared for USL PDL club Fresno Fuego from 2009 to 2011.

Hedrick was selected with the 30th overall pick in the second round of the 2012 MLS SuperDraft by Sporting Kansas City. He was with the club throughout their 2012 MLS season, but never made a first-team appearance with the club.

Hedrick signed with USL Pro club Phoenix FC in March 2013.

Hedrick signed with USL Pro club Oklahoma City Energy FC on 4 February 2014.

Hedrick joined USL side San Antonio FC ahead of their 2017 season.

Hedrick signed with USL Championship side Tulsa Roughnecks FC for the 2019 season. Hedrick served as team captain for Tulsa in 2019, playing every minute he was eligible for. Hedrick announced his retirement from professional soccer on November 11, 2020.
