= Duach Jock =

South Sudanese footballer

Personal information
- Date of birth: 20 December 1986 (age 39)
- Place of birth: Gambela, Ethiopia
- Height: 1.98 m (6 ft 6 in)
- Position: Defender

Team information
- Current team: North County Battalion
- Number: 9

Youth career
- 2005–2008: PLNU Sea Lions

Senior career*
Years	Team	Apps	(Gls)
2010–2012	San Diego Flash		
2013–2015	Orange County Blues	17	(2)
2016–	North County Battalion	0	(0)
2018	→ Chennai City (loan)	0	(0)

International career^{‡}
2013–	South Sudan	6	(0)
- * Club domestic league appearances and goals as of 7 April 2014 ‡ National team caps and goals as of 28 November 2013

Duach Jock (born 20 December 1986) is a South Sudanese footballer who plays for the North County Battalion in National Premier Soccer League.

In 2018, Jock moved to Indian I-League club Chennai City for remainder of the 2017–18 season.

== Early life ==
Jock was born in Ethiopia to South Sudanese refugee parents. He and his parents moved to the United States before South Sudan independence from Sudan and became American citizens.

== International career ==
Jock was selected for the final roster of the South Sudan national football team to compete in the 2013 CECAFA Cup in Kenya.
