= Mohammad Roknipour =

Iranian footballer

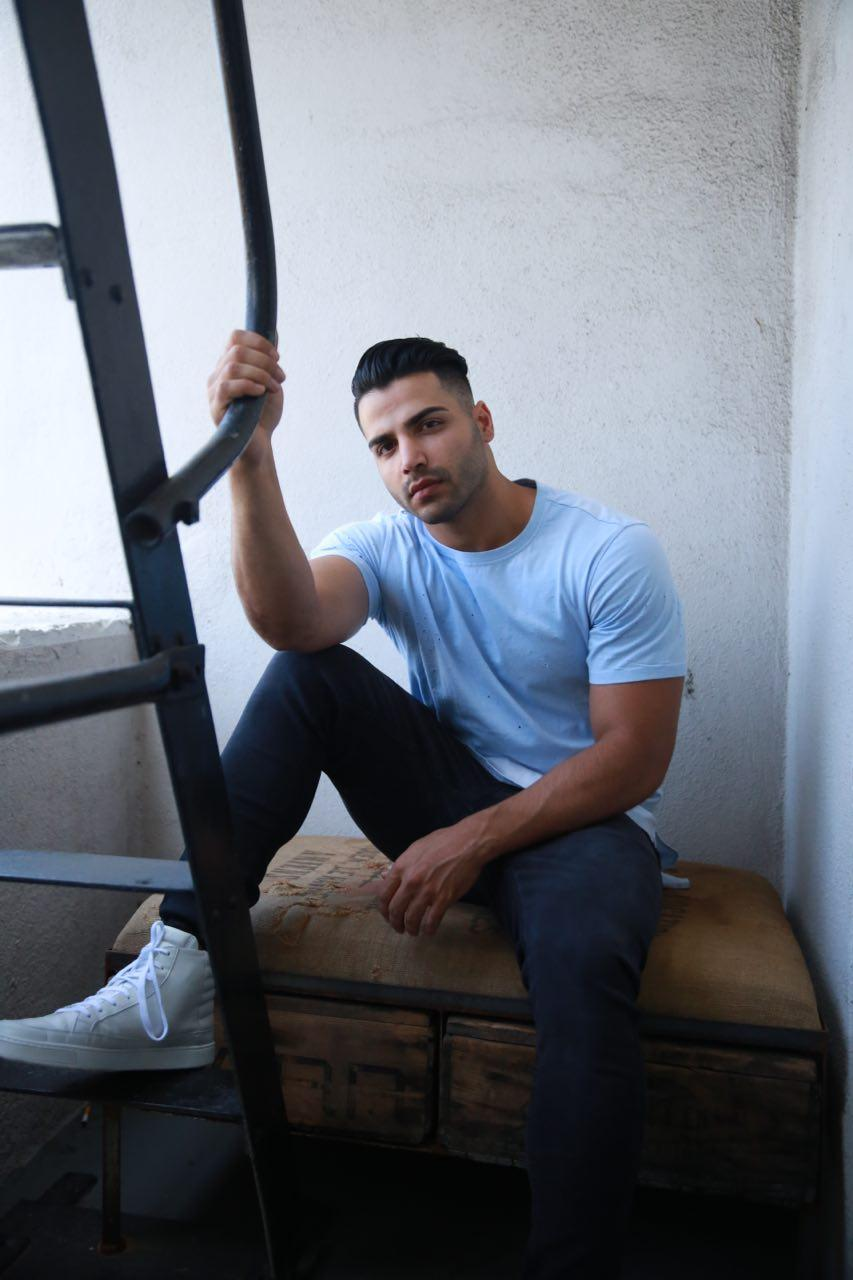

Personal information
- Full name: Mohammad Roknipour
- Date of birth: October 13, 1992 (age 34)
- Place of birth: Tehran, Iran
- Height: 1.83 m (6 ft 0 in)
- Position: Midfielder

Team information
- Current team: Golden State Misioneros
- Number: 19

Youth career
- 2005–2006: Rah Ahan
- 2006–2008: L.D. Alajuelense
- 2008–2011: Canyon High School

Senior career*
Years	Team	Apps	(Gls)
2013	OC Blues Strikers	3	(2)
2013–2014	Orange County Blues	17	(2)
2015–	Golden State Misioneros	3	(1)
- * Club domestic league appearances and goals as of October 4, 2015

Mohammad Roknipour (Persian: محمد رکنی‌پور, born October 13, 1992) is an Iranian footballer who plays as a midfielder for Golden State Misioneros in the Premier Development League.

== Career ==
Roknipour signed his first professional contract with Los Angeles Blues at the tail end of their final season in the USL Pro in 2013. He later continued with the club with their move to Orange County and their re-branding to Orange County Blues in 2014.

Prior to that, Roknipour played in the USL Premier Development League for OC Blues Strikers.
