= David Paul (soccer) =

American soccer player

Personal information
- Full name: Robert David Paul
- Date of birth: February 6, 1987 (age 39)
- Place of birth: Phoenix, Arizona, United States
- Height: 5 ft 11 in (1.80 m)
- Position: Midfielder

Team information
- Current team: Sporting AZ FC

College career
Years	Team	Apps	(Gls)
2005–2008	Southern Wesleyan Warriors		

Senior career*
Years	Team	Apps	(Gls)
2011–2013	Puszcza Niepołomice	57	(8)
2012	Arizona Storm (indoor)	2	(1)
2013	Phoenix FC	5	(2)
2014–2016	St. Louis Ambush (indoor)	28	(4)
2017	FC Arizona	15	(0)
2017–2018	Florida Tropics (indoor)	0	(0)
2018–	Sporting AZ		
- * Club domestic league appearances and goals as of January 24, 2019

Robert David Paul (born February 6, 1987) is an American soccer player who plays for Sporting AZ FC in the United Premier Soccer League.

== Career ==
Paul played college soccer at Southern Wesleyan University from 2005 to 2008, earning all-conference honors and All-American honors every season.

After college, Paul travelled to Argentina and England, earning trials with West Ham United and Milton Keynes Dons, but didn't earn a contract with either club.

Returning to the US, Paul coached at Grand Canyon University for a year, before eventually earning his first professional contract with Polish club Puszcza Niepołomice in 2011.

After two years in Poland, Paul returned to the US to play with USL Pro club Phoenix FC. Paul scored a brace on his Phoenix debut on July 27, 2013, during a 4–0 victory over Charlotte Eagles.
