= SoCal Surf =

- Full name: Southern California Surf
- Founded: 2015
- Dissolved: 2018
- Stadium: Maffucci Field
- Owner: Jason Barbato
- Manager: Cody Worden
- League: Premier Development League

SoCal Surf was an American soccer team from Carlsbad, California, that played in the Premier Development League.

== History ==
North County Battalion was founded in 2015 and began their first season in the 2016 NPSL season at Del Norte High School Stadium. In 2017, the team moved to the USL Premier Development League and were renamed the SoCal Surf, playing at the Army and Navy Academy's Maffucci Field.

== Year-by-year ==
Year	Division	League	Regular season	Playoffs	Open Cup	Avg. attendance
2017	4	PDL	4th, Southwest	Did not qualify	Did not qualify	—

== Players ==
Note: Flags indicate national team as defined under FIFA eligibility rules; some limited exceptions apply. Players may hold more than one non-FIFA nationality.

No.	Pos.	Nation	Player
13	MF	GUM	Ryan Guy
17	DF	USA	Joe Shah
23	MF	USA	Ross Holden
-	GK	USA	James Stroud
-	GK	USA	Drew Tepping
-	GK	USA	Bryant Vera
—	DF	USA	Michael Harrow
-	DF	SSD	Duach Jock
—	DF	USA	Nate Leboffe
-	DF	USA	Connor Mazolewski
-	DF	USA	Sean Ritchey
-	DF	USA	Rory Sutherland
-	DF	USA	Brent Zuniga
-	MF	MEX	Kichi

No.	Pos.	Nation	Player
-	MF	USA	Adam Meltz
-	MF	USA	Edgar Mendez
-	MF	USA	Nelson Pizarro
-	MF	USA	Berrick Rastock
-	MF	USA	Esteban Reyes
-	MF	USA	Brennan Tennelle
-	MF	USA	Sergio Valle-Ortiz
—	FW	USA	Michigan Deteresa
—	MF	URU	Diego Fontes
—	FW	USA	Eric Lopez
-	FW	USA	Enrique Melo
-	FW	USA	Juan Michel
-	FW	USA	Blake Milton
-	FW	USA	Brandon Zuniga
