= Lalo Fernández =

Mexican footballer (born 1992)

Personal information
- Full name: Eduardo Fernández Lopez
- Date of birth: December 16, 1992 (age 33)
- Place of birth: Guadalajara, Jalisco, Mexico
- Height: 1.91 m (6 ft 3 in)
- Position: Goalkeeper

Youth career
- 2004–2006: Premier Panthers
- 2006–2008: Texas Fire
- 2008–2010: FB Chivas Houston
- 2010–2011: Real Salt Lake
- 2011: Peñarol

Senior career*
Years	Team	Apps	(Gls)
2012–2017	Real Salt Lake	0	(0)
2013	→ Phoenix FC (loan)	1	(0)
2015–2017	→ Real Monarchs (loan)	50	(0)
2017–2020	Tigres UANL	0	(0)
- * Club domestic league appearances and goals as of September 5, 2017

Eduardo "Lalo" Fernández Lopez (Note: In this Spanish name, the first or paternal surname is Fernández and the second or maternal family name is Lopez.) (born December 16, 1992) is a Mexican footballer who plays as a goalkeeper. Fernandez has dual citizenship with Mexico and the United States.

== Career ==
On January 9, 2012, Fernández signed as a Home Grown Player with Real Salt Lake.

Fernández was loaned to USL Pro club Phoenix FC in July 2013 and made his professional debut on July 12, 2013, against Antigua Barracuda FC.

On September 5, 2017, Fernández signed for Liga MX side Tigres UANL.

== Personal ==
His father, Eduardo, was also a professional footballer playing as a goalkeeper in the Mexican first division.

== Honours ==
Real Monarchs

- USL Championship Regular Season Title: 2017

UANL

- Liga MX: Apertura 2017, Clausura 2019
