= Devon Grousis =

American soccer player

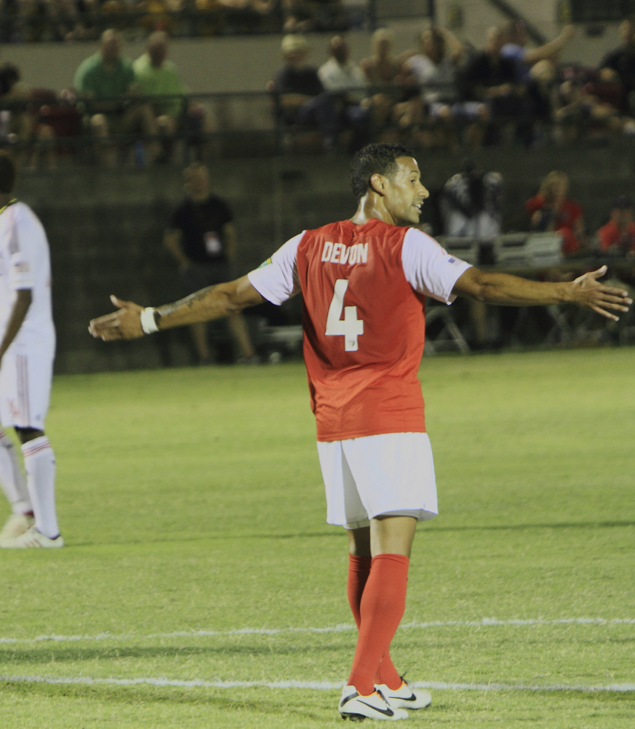
- Devon playing for Phoenix FC

Personal information
- Full name: Devon Dimitri Grousis-Henderson
- Date of birth: November 7, 1987 (age 38)
- Place of birth: Fresno, California, U.S.
- Height: 6 ft 1 in (1.85 m)
- Position: Defender

Youth career
- 2008–2011: Fresno City College

Senior career*
Years	Team	Apps	(Gls)
2008–2011	Fresno Fuego	43	(6)
2012	Charlotte Eagles	17	(2)
2013	Phoenix FC	21	(0)
2014–2015	Arizona United	6	(0)
- * Club domestic league appearances and goals as of February 15, 2016

Devon Dimitri Grousis-Henderson (born November 7, 1987) is an American retired soccer player. He is a community and marketing manager with Rainbow Studios, a video game developer.

== Career ==
=== College and amateur ===
Devon is a product of the Junior College system, spending three years at Fresno City College. After being recruited by a number of schools including UCSB, SFSU, Chico State, USF, and Stanislaus Univ, he settled on Fresno Pacific University in his home town, where he played his 2009 junior year. During his sophomore year at FCC, after a successful trial, he was signed with his home town USL Premier Development League side, Fresno Fuego, where he started as a reserve. Devon moved his way up to be one of the instrumental players in the team's 2011 undefeated regular season run.

=== Professional ===
Devon spent the 2012 pre-season with Major League Soccer side San Jose Earthquakes. After being released, he was brought in by Mark Steffans of the Charlotte Eagles, where he spent his first month largely as a reserve squad player. After the team's 0-4-1 start to the season, where they had an average 3 goals per game, he was assigned to first team action. In his first professional game, the team took a 2–1 victory on the road to Harrisburg City Islanders. From the point of his signing on, the team went on to claim a 14-7-2 record, averaging under a goal against per game, and finishing second best in the league for goals scored against.

In late October 2012, he was signed by Phoenix FC for an undisclosed amount.
