= Jhonny Bravo =

Peruvian footballer (born 1985)

Personal information
- Full name: Jhonathan Jose Bravo
- Date of birth: December 5, 1985 (age 40)
- Place of birth: Lima, Peru
- Height: 5 ft 10 in (1.78 m)
- Position: Midfielder

Youth career
- 2005–2007: Los Angeles Mission Eagles

Senior career*
Years	Team	Apps	(Gls)
2007–2008	San Fernando Valley Quakes	6	(1)
2011	Los Angeles Blues	11	(1)
2014	Cal FC		
2016–	Las Vegas Legends		
- * Club domestic league appearances and goals

Jhonathan Jose Bravo (born December 5, 1985, in Lima) is a Peruvian retired footballer.

== Career ==
=== College and amateur ===
Bravo grew up in Sylmar, California, and played college soccer at Los Angeles Mission College from 2005 to 2007, where he was named to the Western State Conference All-Conference First Team as a freshman. He also played briefly with the San Fernando Valley Quakes in the USL Premier Development League in 2007 and 2008.

=== Professional ===
After playing and coaching for several years in various Los Angeles-area amateur leagues, Bravo turned professional when he signed with the expansion Los Angeles Blues of the new USL Professional League in February 2010. He made his professional debut on April 15, 2011, in a 3–0 victory over Sevilla Puerto Rico, and scored his first professional goal on May 20 in a 1–1 tie with the Dayton Dutch Lions.

== Personal ==
Jhonny's brother, Gerardo Bravo, is also a professional soccer player.
