= Andrew Weber =

American soccer player

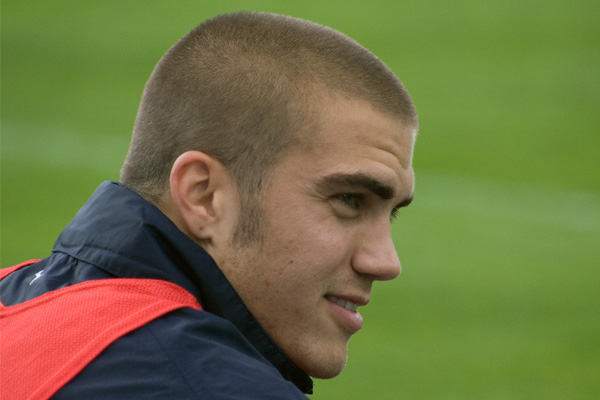
- Weber in 2008

Personal information
- Full name: Andrew Weber
- Date of birth: August 9, 1983 (age 43)
- Place of birth: Austin, Texas, United States
- Height: 6 ft 2 in (1.88 m)
- Position: Goalkeeper

Team information
- Current team: Sporting Arizona FC
- Number: 1

College career
Years	Team	Apps	(Gls)
2001–2004	New Mexico Lobos	83	(1)

Senior career*
Years	Team	Apps	(Gls)
2003	Cape Cod Crusaders	2	(0)
2004	Indiana Invaders	9	(0)
2005	D.C. United	0	(0)
2006–2008	Montreal Impact	29	(0)
2007	→ Trois-Rivières Attak (loan)	2	(0)
2009–2011	San Jose Earthquakes	2	(0)
2012	Seattle Sounders FC	3	(0)
2013	Phoenix FC	14	(0)
2013	→ Seattle Sounders FC (loan)	3	(0)
2014–2015	Portland Timbers	4	(0)
2015	→ Portland Timbers 2 (loan)	3	(0)
- * Club domestic league appearances and goals as of August 14, 2017

Andrew Weber (born August 9, 1983) is an American former soccer player.

== Career ==
=== Youth and college ===
Weber played college soccer at the University of New Mexico, where he holds UNM's career records for games played (83), minutes played (7,681), goalie wins (50), saves (350), and shutouts (25). He also played with the Cape Cod Crusaders and the Indiana Invaders in the USL Premier Development League, and was part of the squad that won the 2003 PDL title.

=== Professional ===
Weber began his professional career with D.C. United signed as a developmental player on June 3, 2005, after impressing during a one-week trial. Although he did not play a game in Major League Soccer, Weber took part in three matchups with United's reserve team. He joined Montreal Impact in the USL First Division in April 2006, and went on to make 29 appearances for the Québécois team over the next two years. Montreal re-signed Weber for the 2007 season. During the 2007 season, he was loaned to the Impact's farm team, Trois-Rivières Attak of the Canadian Soccer League. Weber made his debut for the Attak on June 3, 2007, in a match against the Portuguese Supra, which resulted in a 4–2 victory. In his final season with Montreal, Weber appeared in the 2008–09 CONCACAF Champions League against Atlante.

Weber signed with the San Jose Earthquakes on February 11, 2009. He made his league debut on September 27 in a 2–1 victory against D.C. United. Weber was released by the team on June 29, 2010, but re-signed with San Jose on March 7, 2011. At the end of the season, the club declined his 2012 contract option, and Weber entered the 2011 MLS Re-Entry Draft. He was not selected in the draft and became a free agent.

Weber signed with Seattle Sounders FC for the 2012 season. At the season's end, Seattle declined its 2013 contract option, and Weber entered the 2012 MLS Re-Entry Draft. He was not selected in the draft and became a free agent. Weber joined Phoenix FC in USL Pro for the 2013 season and later rejoined the Sounders on loan. He returned to Phoenix following the loan (having made three starts in Seattle).

Weber joined the Portland Timbers ahead of the 2014 season. In 2017, he signed with FC Arizona of the National Premier Soccer League.

== Personal life ==
Weber and his twin brother Elliot were contestants on the 20th season of The Amazing Race. They finished in 9th place out of 11 teams and were eliminated in Asunción, Paraguay. Moreover, they were the first team eliminated in Paraguay.

== Honors ==
=== Club ===
Cape Cod Crusaders

- USL Premier Development League Champions: 2003

Portland Timbers

- MLS Cup: 2015
- Western Conference (playoffs): 2015
