= Shahryar Dastan =

Iranian footballer

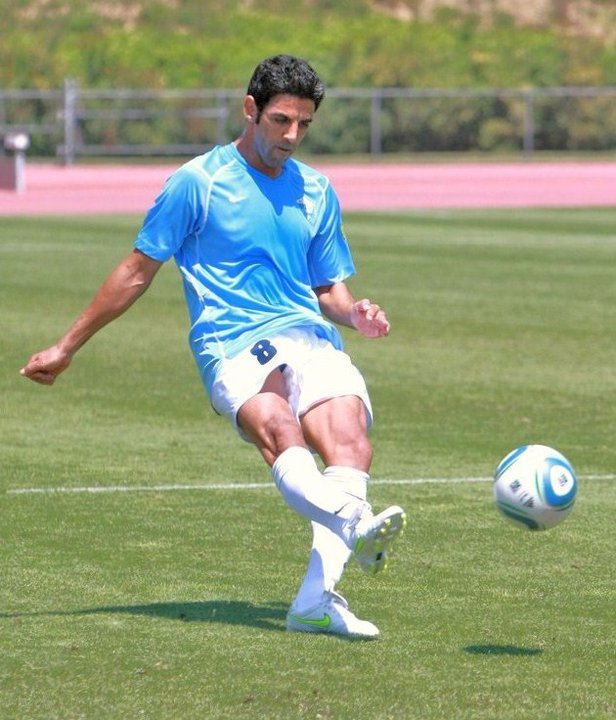

Personal information
- Full name: Shahryar Dastan
- Date of birth: March 18, 1976 (age 50)
- Place of birth: Tehran, Iran
- Height: 6 ft 2 in (1.88 m)
- Position: Midfielder

Team information
- Current team: One Taguig (sporting director)

Senior career*
| Years | Team | Apps | (Gls) |
| 1994–1998 | Saipa | | |
| 1999 | Esteghlal Tehran | | |
| 2000–2001 | Paykan | | |
| 2002 | Teraktor Sazi Tabriz | | |
| 2003 | Al Yarmouk | | |
| 2004 | Saipa | | |
| 2005–2008 | Homa | | |
| 2009 | Shahrdari Mahshahr | | |
| 2010 | Hollywood United Hitmen | 1 | (0) |
| 2010–2011 | Missouri Comets (indoor) | 8 | (0) |
| 2011 | Los Angeles Blues | 16 | (0) |
- * Club domestic league appearances and goals as of August 13, 2011

Shahryar Dastan (born March 18, 1976, in Tehran) is an Iranian-American former football player, currently sporting director of Philippines Football League club One Taguig.

== Career ==
=== Iran ===
Dastan played extensively in the Iranian football league system, for Saipa, Esteghlal Tehran, Paykan, Teraktor Sazi Tabriz, Nadial Yarmouk, Homa and Shahrdari Mahshahr. He was part of the Saipa team which won back-to-back Azadegan League championships in 1994 and 1995, and competed in the 1995–96 Asian Club Championship, in which Saipa finished in fourth place.

=== United States ===
Dastan came to the United States in 2010, and played for the Hollywood United Hitmen in the USL Premier Development League. After spending a brief period playing professional indoor soccer with the Missouri Comets in the Major Indoor Soccer League, Dastan signed with the expansion Los Angeles Blues of the new USL Professional League in February 2011. After completing his playing career, he have as become a youth coach.

=== International ===
Dastan was part of the Iranian Youth National Team from 1991 to 1993, and played for the Iranian national futsal team at the 2001 Tiger Cup futsal championship in Singapore.
