= Gerardo Bravo =

Peruvian footballer (born 1981)

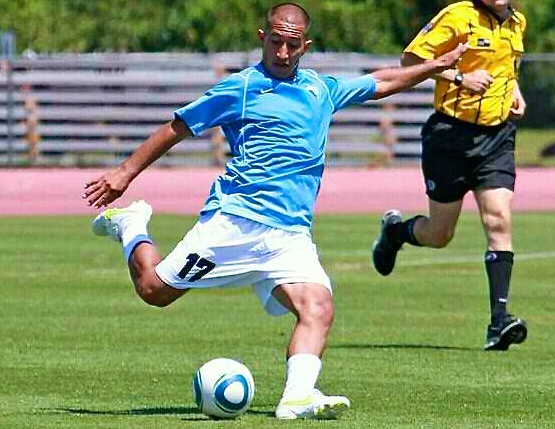
- LA Blues' Gerardo Bravo

Personal information
- Full name: Gerardo Miguel Bravo Benavides
- Date of birth: December 22, 1981 (age 44)
- Place of birth: Lima, Peru
- Height: 6 ft 0 in (1.83 m)
- Position: Midfielder

Youth career
- 2006–2008: Los Angeles Mission Eagles

Senior career*
Years	Team	Apps	(Gls)
2007	San Fernando Valley Quakes	4	(0)
2011	Los Angeles Blues	6	(1)
- * Club domestic league appearances and goals

Gerardo Miguel Bravo Benavides (born December 22, 1981, in Lima) is a Peruvian retired footballer.

== Career ==
=== College and amateur ===
Bravo moved with his family from his native Peru to the United States as a teenager, settling in Sylmar, California. He played college soccer at Los Angeles Mission College from 2006 to 2009. He also played briefly with the San Fernando Valley Quakes in the USL Premier Development League in 2007.

=== Professional ===
After playing and coaching for several years in various Los Angeles-area amateur leagues, Bravo turned professional when he signed with the expansion Los Angeles Blues of the new USL Professional League in February 2010. He made his professional debut - and scored his first professional goal - on April 15, 2011, in a 3–0 victory over Sevilla Puerto Rico

== Personal ==
Gerardo's brother, Jhonny Bravo, is also a professional soccer player.
