= Christopher Santana =

American soccer player

Personal information
- Full name: Christopher Santana
- Date of birth: August 20, 1992 (age 34)
- Place of birth: Bishop, California, United States
- Height: 1.82 m (6 ft 0 in)
- Position: Midfielder

Youth career
- 2009: Chivas USA
- 2010–2013: UC Irvine Anteaters

Senior career*
Years	Team	Apps	(Gls)
2012	Orange County Blue Star	9	(1)
2013	OC Blues Strikers	3	(1)
2014–2016	Orange County Blues	50	(5)
- * Club domestic league appearances and goals as of October 13, 2016

Christopher "Chino" Santana (born August 20, 1992) is an American soccer player who last played as a midfielder for Orange County Blues FC in USL Pro.

== Career ==
=== Youth and college ===
Santana played four years of college soccer at UC Irvine between 2010 and 2013, where he was named Second Team All-Big West in 2013.

While at college, Santana also appeared for USL PDL clubs Orange County Blue Star in 2012 and OC Blues Strikers in 2013.

=== Professional ===
Along with his brother, Jiovanni Santana, Christopher signed with USL Pro club Orange County Blues FC on April 16, 2014.
