= Jimmy Turner (American soccer) =

American soccer player (born 1989)

Personal information
- Full name: James Turner
- Date of birth: October 9, 1989 (age 37)
- Place of birth: Mission Viejo, California, United States
- Height: 6 ft 0 in (1.83 m)
- Position: Defender

Youth career
- 2008–2011: UC Irvine Anteaters

Senior career*
Years	Team	Apps	(Gls)
2009–2011	Orange County Blue Star	43	(0)
2013–2015	Orange County Blues FC	56	(0)
- * Club domestic league appearances and goals

James Turner (born October 9, 1989) is an American retired soccer player who last played for Orange County Blues FC in the USL Professional Division.
