= Mehrshad Momeni =

Iranian Professional footballer (born 1987)

Personal information
- Full name: Mehrshad Momeni Azandaryani
- Date of birth: 15 August 1987 (age 39)
- Place of birth: Tehran, Iran
- Height: 1.75 m (5 ft 9 in)
- Positions: Right back; center midfielder

Youth career
- 2002–2007: Pas

Senior career*
Years	Team	Apps	(Gls)
2007–2009	PAS Hamedan	1	(0)
2009–2011	Esteghlal	9	(0)
2011	Los Angeles Blues	21	(4)
2013–2016	Orange County Blues	89	(3)
- * Club domestic league appearances and goals as of September 11, 2014

Mehrshad Momeni (Persian: مهرشاد مومنی, born August 15, 1987) is an Iranian Professional footballer.

== Club career ==
Momeni played with Esteghlal from 2009 to 2011. He started his professional career in PAS Hamedan.

Club performance			League		Cup		Continental		Total		
Season	Club	League	Apps	Goals	Apps	Goals	Apps	Goals	Apps	Goals	
Iran						League		Hazfi Cup		Asia	Total
2007–08	PAS	Pro League	1	0	0	0	—		1	0	
2008–09	PAS	Pro League	0	0	1	0	—		1	0	
2009–10	Esteghlal	Pro League	1	0	2	0	0	0	3	0	
2010–11	Esteghlal	Pro League	2	0	1	0	0	0	3	0	
USA			League		Open Cup		North America		Total		
2011	LA Blues	USL Pro	12	2	3	2	—		15	4	
Total	Iran		4	0	4	0	0	0	8	0	
Total	USA		12	2	6	2	0	0	15	4	
Career total			16	2	6	2	0	0	22	4	

- Assists

Season	Team	Assists
09-10	Esteghlal	0
10-11	Esteghlal	0

== Coaching career ==
In 2016, Mehrshad retired from playing in order to become a youth academy coach in Corona, California.
