= Allan Russell =

Scottish footballer

Personal information
- Full name: Allan John Russell
- Date of birth: 13 December 1980 (age 45)
- Place of birth: Glasgow, Scotland
- Positions: Midfielder; forward

Youth career
- 1990–1997: Rangers

Senior career*
Years	Team	Apps	(Gls)
1997–1999	Hibernian		
1999–2003	Hamilton Academical	65	(13)
2003–2005	St Mirren	51	(9)
2005	Macclesfield Town	13	(2)
2005–2006	Mansfield Town	18	(2)
2006–2007	Forest Green Rovers	19	(4)
2007	Partick Thistle	14	(1)
2007–2008	Airdrie United	32	(19)
2008–2010	Kilmarnock	25	(4)
2010–2011	Carolina RailHawks	30	(5)
2012–2014	Orange County Blues FC	55	(8)
Total		322	(67)

Managerial career
- 2017–2021: England (attacking coach)
- 2021–2022: Aberdeen (assistant)
- 2022–2023: Norwich City (set-piece coach)
- 2022: Norwich City (caretaker)
- * Club domestic league appearances and goals

Allan John Russell (born 13 December 1980) is a Scottish former professional footballer who was most recently a set-piece coach for EFL Championship club Norwich City.

== Playing career ==
=== Scotland and England ===
Born in Glasgow, Russell began his career in 1999 with Hamilton Academical, making over sixty league appearances over a four-year period. In 2003, Russell began a two-year spell with St Mirren before moving to English side Macclesfield Town in early 2005. Russell's stay at Macclesfield lasted only a few months and he moved on to Mansfield Town at the start of the 2005–06 season.

Russell returned to Scotland with Partick Thistle in January 2007. At Partick he scored once; his goal coming in a 1–0 win over Livingston. Russell began the 2007–08 season with Airdrie, where a December 2007 Player of the Month award and his goalscoring form – by February 2008 he had already scored more than any previous season – attracted interest from Scottish Premier League sides Kilmarnock and Dundee United.

In May 2008, Russell netted the Scottish Football League Second Division Player of the Year award having scored 28 goals in a record breaking season and was eventually signed by Scottish Premier League side Kilmarnock signing a two-year deal. He left Kilmarnock after the expiry of his contract in 2010.

=== United States ===
Russell signed for Carolina RailHawks on 23 July 2010. He stayed with the club through the 2011 season winning the 2010 and 2011 NASL league Championships. He then signed with Los Angeles Blues of the USL Pro Division on 8 December 2011, who later changed franchise name to Orange County Blues.

Russell captained Orange County Blues for a time, playing both as a defensive midfielder and as a striker.

== Coaching career ==
In March 2017, Russell joined the England coaching staff as their striker coach. During the 2018 FIFA World Cup, he earned particular praise for his work on the England team's set pieces, after a well-choreographed goal in their game against Panama.

Russell was appointed assistant first team coach at Aberdeen in April 2021, initially combining the role with his England duties. He left his consultancy position with England a month later, after he admitted allowing his younger brother to drive while uninsured.

When Dean Smith was terminated as manager of Championship club Norwich City in December 2022, Russell and the club's Head of Football Development, Steve Weaver were announced as the now co-head coaches on an interim basis a few months after Russell was appointed their set-piece coach, the club's December 2022 statement confirms. Russell then became the set piece coach for Norwich. In March 2023, Russell and Norwich parted ways and they agreed to a mutual termination of his contract.

== Personal life ==
In January 2023, Russell began dating American actress and singer Jana Kramer, and the couple subsequently moved to Franklin, Tennessee. On May 25, 2023, it was confirmed the two were engaged after six months of dating. On June 8, 2023, the couple confirmed via Instagram that they are expecting their first child together. Kramer gave birth to a son, Roman James Russell, on November 13, 2023. Russell and Kramer were married in Scotland on 13 July 2024.
