= Orange County SC U-23 =

Orange County U-23
- Full name: Orange County Soccer Club Under-23
- Founded: 2011; 15 years ago
- Owner: James Keston
- Head Coach: Jerry Tamashiro
- League: USL League Two
- 2019: 4th, Southwest Division; Playoffs: DNQ
Home colors

Orange County SC U-23 is an American soccer team based in Irvine, California. Founded in 2011 as the Los Angeles Blues 23, the team plays in USL League Two, the fourth tier of the American Soccer Pyramid.

The team plays its home games at the Orange County Great Park. The team's colors are black, orange, and white.

The club was known as "Los Angeles Blues 23" in 2011, "Pali Blues" in 2012, "OC Blues Strikers FC" in 2013, "OC Pateadores Blues" in 2014 and "Orange County Blues U-23" in 2015–2016.

== History ==
Los Angeles Blues 23 was announced as a USL Premier Development League expansion franchise on April 7, 2011 as a replacement for the Hollywood United Hitmen franchise, which left the PDL for the National Premier Soccer League just before the start of the 2011 PDL season. The team is part of the development program of the Los Angeles Blues USL Pro team, which joined in 2011, and its sister club is the Pali Blues of the United Soccer Leagues W-League, whose name it adopted as of 2012.

The team played its first competitive game on April 29, 2011, a 0–0 tie with Fresno Fuego, and achieved its first victory on May 28, 2011, a 2–0 win over the Los Angeles Misioneros, with both goals – the first in franchise history – being scored by Daniel Martinez.

== Year-by-year ==
Year	Division	League	Regular season	Playoffs	Open Cup
Los Angeles Blues 23
2011	4	USL PDL	6th, Southwest	Did not qualify	Did not qualify
Pali Blues
2012	4	USL PDL	9th, Southwest	Did not qualify	Did not qualify
OC Blues Strikers FC
2013	4	USL PDL	6th, Southwest	Did not qualify	Did not qualify
OC Pateadores Blues
2014	4	USL PDL	5th, Southwest	Did not qualify	Did not qualify
Orange County Blues U-23
2015	4	USL PDL	5th, Southwest	Did not qualify	Did not qualify
2016	4	USL PDL	6th, Southwest	Did not qualify	Did not qualify
Orange County SC U-23
2017	4	USL PDL	9th, Southwest	Did not qualify	Did not qualify
2018	4	USL PDL	3rd, Southwest	Did not qualify	Did not qualify
2019	4	USL League Two	4th, Southwest	Did not qualify	Did not qualify

== Head coaches ==
- (Mexico) Agustin Rodriguez (2011)
- (United States) Federico Bianchi (2011–2016)
- (United States) Chris Volk (2017–2018)
- (Peru) Jerry Tamashiro (2019)

== Stadia ==
- Vanguard University Stadium, Costa Mesa, California (2014–present)
- Stadium by the Sea at Palisades Charter High School; Pacific Palisades, California (2011–2013)
- Titan Stadium; Fullerton, California 1 game (2011)
