= 2014 Orlando City SC season =

Orlando City
2014 season
- President: Phil Rawlins
- Manager: Adrian Heath
- Stadium: Hess Field 17, ESPN Wide World of Sports Complex
- USL Pro: 1st
- USL Pro Playoffs: QF
- U.S. Open Cup: 4th round
- WDW Pro Soccer Classic: T-3rd
- Top goalscorer: League: Kevin Molino (20); All: Kevin Molino (25)
- Highest home attendance: 5,029 vs LA Galaxy II (June 28) vs Charlotte (Aug. 2) vs Harrisburg (Aug. 16)
- Lowest home attendance: 4,206 vs OC Blues (June 11)
- Average home league attendance: 4,743
Home colors	Away colors	Third colors

The 2014 Orlando City SC season was the club's fourth season of existence in Orlando, and their final season playing in the lower divisions. A Major League Soccer expansion franchise with the same name began play in 2015. The team entered the season as the defending USL Pro champions, beating Charlotte Eagles in the Championship Game after finishing second in the regular season.

== Background ==
On November 19, 2013, it was announced that Orlando City would be the next expansion franchise in Major League Soccer, the league's 21st team, to begin play in 2015. The announcement was made at Church Street Station in downtown Orlando, in the old Cheyenne Saloon, and was attended by an overflow crowd estimated by the Orlando Police Department at around 4,000. This made 2014 their final season in USL Pro.

Manager Adrian Heath said that the construction of the team for the 2014 season will be centered around getting players who can potentially move up with the team in 2015. As a result, he allowed several player contracts to lapse, only keeping a handful of vital personnel. He also signed goalkeeper Carl Woszczynski away from Los Angeles Blues, to play behind starting goalkeeper and team captain Miguel Gallardo.

Orlando City continued their affiliation with Sporting Kansas City through the MLS-USL Pro development alliance for the 2014 season. For the season, Sporting began transitioning their affiliation to Oklahoma City Energy FC, and would split their transfers between the two clubs before making Oklahoma City their sole affiliate in 2015.

The day before the MLS announcement, Orlando City and Orlando Health announced that the hospital system had signed a multi-year sponsorship contract which would make Orlando Health the team's presenting sponsor for its final USL Pro season, and going into MLS.

On June 3, 2014, Phil Rawlins sold Orlando City's USL Pro franchise license to minority owner Wayne Estopinal. While Orlando City moves on to MLS, the remaining USL Pro team will move to Louisville, Kentucky, in 2015 and become Louisville City FC. The team will maintain Orlando City's MLS colors. At the same time, James O'Connor retired as a player to become Louisville City's manager.

With the Citrus Bowl under construction, and their new stadium planned to open in 2016, Orlando City moved their games to the ESPN Wide World of Sports Complex. They played at Field 17 in the Hess Sports Fields, where they invested to expand its capacity to 5,300.

== Competitions ==
=== Friendlies ===
February 11, 2014	Chicago Fire	3–0	Orlando City	Bradenton, Florida
7:00 p.m. EST	Shipp 13'; Jackson 29'; Braun 77'	Report		Stadium: IMG Academy Stadium

March 8, 2014	Orlando City	2–0	FIU Panthers	Sanford, Florida
3:00 p.m. EST	Pulis 24', 66'			Stadium: Seminole Soccer Complex

March 12, 2014	Orlando City	2–0	Rollins Tars	Sanford, Florida
7:00 p.m. EDT	Molino 21'; Chin 90'			Stadium: Seminole Soccer Complex

March 15, 2014	Orlando City	3–0	Stetson Hatters	Sanford, Florida
7:00 p.m. EST				Stadium: Seminole Soccer Complex

April 1, 2014	USF Bulls	3–2	Orlando City	Tampa, Florida
7:00 p.m. EDT				Stadium: Corbett Soccer Stadium

May 23, 2014	Orlando City	0–1	Roma	Lake Buena Vista, Florida
8:00 p.m.		Report	Totti 20'	Stadium: Hess Field 17, ESPN WWOS

June 20, 2014	Orlando City	0–0	São Paulo	Lake Buena Vista, Florida
8:00 p.m.	Boden (yellow card) 69'	Report		Stadium: Hess Field 17, ESPN WWOS

=== WDW Pro Soccer Classic ===
The team announced on December 5, 2013, that they would return to the Walt Disney World Pro Soccer Classic.

February 19, 2014 1	Orlando City	1–1	Philadelphia Union	Lake Buena Vista, Florida
6:00 p.m. EST	Hertzog 31'; Boden (yellow card) 53'	Report	Fernandes 72'	Stadium: ESPN Wide World of Sports Complex

February 22, 2014 2	Toronto FC	1–1	Orlando City	Lake Buena Vista, Florida
6:00 p.m. EST	Bekker 13' (pen.)	Report	Trialist #25 (yellow card) 13'; Howard 87'	Stadium: ESPN Wide World of Sports Complex

February 26, 2014 3	Orlando City	4–4	Columbus Crew	Lake Buena Vista, Florida
6:00 p.m. EST	Ceren 30'; Molino 51'; Mbengue 83'; Chin 88'	Report	Finley 42'; Finlay 76', 88'; Meram 86'	Stadium: ESPN Wide World of Sports Complex

March 1, 2014 3rd Place Match	Orlando City	4–4	New York Red Bulls	Lake Buena Vista, Florida
6:00 p.m. EST	Hertzog 7'; Chin 47'; Álvarez (yellow card) 67'; Mbengue 76'; Molino 86'	Report	Wright-Phillips 29', 52'; Armando (yellow card) 42'; Sekagya 68'; Steele 80'	Stadium: ESPN Wide World of Sports Complex

=== I-4 Derby ===
April 30, 2014 Preseason	Orlando City	3–0	Tampa Bay Rowdies	Lake Buena Vista, Florida
7:30pm EST	Mbengue 28'; Chin 44'; Span 90+1'	Report		Stadium: Hess Field 17, ESPN WWOS

July 6, 2014 Preseason	Tampa Bay Rowdies	2–3	Orlando City	St. Petersburg, Florida
6:30pm EDT	Hristov 35'; Hristov 59'		Molino 31'; Ceren 43'; Hertzog 75'	Stadium: Al Lang Field

=== USL Pro ===
All times from this point on Eastern Daylight Time (UTC−04:00)

==== USL Pro regular season ====
===== Results summary =====
Overall								Home						Away					
Pld	W	D	L	GF	GA	GD	Pts	W	D	L	GF	GA	GD	W	D	L	GF	GA	GD
28	19	5	4	56	24	+32	62	13	1	0	39	8	+31	6	4	4	17	16	+1

Source: Match reports

Round	1	2	3	4	5	6	7	8	9	10	11	12	13	14	15	16	17	18	19	20	21	22	23	24	25	26	27	28
Stadium	A	H	H	H	A	A	H	A	A	A	H	H	H	H	A	H	A	H	A	A	H	A	H	A	A	H	A	H
Result	D	D	W	W	W	W	W	W	D	W	W	W	W	W	W	W	L	W	D	L	W	L	W	L	W	W	D	W

Source: Match reports
A = Away; H = Home; W = Win; D = Draw; L = Loss

===== Results =====
March 22, 2014 1	Charleston Battery	1–1	Orlando City	Charleston, South Carolina
7:30 p.m.	Diouf 65'; Griffith (red card) 90+3'	Report; Report; Match Replay	'da Luz 75'	Stadium: Blackbaud Stadium; Attendance: 3,773; Referee: Matthew Jozaitis

March 29, 2014 2	Orlando City	1–1	Pittsburgh Riverhounds	Lake Buena Vista, Florida
7:30 p.m.	Boden 58'	Report; Report; Match Replay	Marshall (yellow card) 34'; Angulo 50'	Stadium: Hess Field 17, ESPN WWOS; Attendance: 5,028; Referee: Caleb Mendez

April 5, 2014 3	Orlando City	3–1	Rochester Rhinos	Lake Buena Vista, Florida
7:30 p.m.	Molino 3'; Valentino 35'; Boden (yellow card) 54'; Turner (yellow card) 68'; Chin 75'	Report; Report; Match Replay	Hoffer (yellow card) 17'; Banks 54'	Stadium: Hess Field 17, ESPN WWOS; Attendance: 4,776; Referee: Andres Pfefferkorm

April 12, 2014 4	Orlando City	1–0	Charleston Battery	Lake Buena Vista, Florida
7:30 p.m.	Span 73'; Turner (yellow card) 76'	Report; Report; Match Replay	Prince (yellow card) 49'	Stadium: Hess Field 17, ESPN WWOS; Attendance: 4,826; Referee: Caleb Mendez

April 22, 2014 5	FC Dallas Reserves	2–3	Orlando City	Frisco, Texas
8:00 p.m.	de la Tejera 62'; Zimmerman 90+1'	Report; Report; Match Replay	Mbengue 17'; Molino 47', 64'	Stadium: Toyota Stadium; Attendance: 375; Referee: Christopher Mercado

April 26, 2014 6	OKC Energy	1–2	Orlando City	Oklahoma City, Oklahoma
8:00 p.m.	Perry 90'	Report; Match Replay	Chin 24'; Molino 56'; Clark (yellow card) 88'	Stadium: Pribil Stadium; Attendance: 4,230; Referee: Tony Mensah

May 4, 2014 7	Orlando City	3–1	OKC Energy	Lake Buena Vista, Florida
7:30 p.m.	Chin 32', 47'; Álvarez 33'; Turner (yellow card) 47'; Pulis (yellow card) 86'	Report; Match Replay	Lund 41'; Thomas (yellow card) 65'	Stadium: Hess Field 17, ESPN WWOS; Attendance: 4,532; Referee: Marcos Oliveira

May 9, 2014 8	Pittsburgh Riverhounds	0–1	Orlando City	Pittsburgh, Pennsylvania
7:00 p.m.	Dallman (yellow card) 52'; Obodai (yellow card) 56'	Report; Match Replay	Molino 14'; Ceren (yellow card) 58'; Boden (yellow card) 60'; Turner (yellow card) 64'; Álvarez (yellow card) 69'; Gallardo (yellow card) 74'	Stadium: Highmark Stadium; Attendance: 2,485; Referee: Kevin Terry, Jr.

May 10, 2014 9	Rochester Rhinos	1–1	Orlando City	Rochester, New York
7:05 p.m.	Rosenlund 34'	Report; Match Replay	Boden 62'; Turner (yellow card) 64'	Stadium: Sahlen's Stadium; Attendance: 5,457; Referee: Vito Testa

May 17, 2014 10	Arizona United	0–1	Orlando City	Peoria, Arizona
10:10 p.m.	Dillon (yellow card) 42'	Report; Match Replay	Gallego 8' (o.g.); Redding (yellow card) 42'; Rusin (yellow card) 48'; Lopez (yellow card) 79'; Álvarez (yellow card) 83'	Stadium: Peoria Sports Complex; Attendance: 2,044; Referee: Younes Marrakchi

May 21, 2014 11	Orlando City	3–1	Charlotte Eagles	Lake Buena Vista, Florida
7:30 p.m.	Molino 11', 31', 77'	Report; Match Replay	Thompson (yellow card) 12'; Duckett (yellow card) 56'; Gentile 79'	Stadium: Hess Field 17, ESPN WWOS; Attendance: 4,219; Referee: Lance Vanhaitsma

May 31, 2014 12	Orlando City	2–0	Charleston Battery	Lake Buena Vista, Florida
7:30 p.m.	Hertzog 42'; Ceren (yellow card) 52'; Rusin (yellow card) 61'; Molino 76'	Report; Match Replay	Prince (yellow card) 51'; Sanyang (yellow card) 78'	Stadium: Hess Field 17, ESPN WWOS; Attendance: 4,987; Referee: Marcos DeOliveira

June 7, 2014 13	Orlando City	2–1	Montreal Impact Reserves	Lake Buena Vista, Florida
7:30 p.m.	Span 12', 60'	Report; Match Replay	Tissot 75'	Stadium: Hess Field 17, ESPN WWOS; Attendance: 4,612; Referee: Matthew Misscannon

June 11, 2014 14	Orlando City	4–1	Orange County Blues	Lake Buena Vista, Florida
7:30 p.m.	Hertzog 45+1' da Luz 50'; Rusin 79', 87'	Report; Match Replay	Santana 38'	Stadium: Hess Field 17, ESPN WWOS; Attendance: 4,206; Referee: Andres Pfefferkorm

June 22, 2014 15	Dayton Dutch Lions	0–2	Orlando City	Beavercreek, Ohio
3:00 p.m.		Report; Match Replay	Mbengue 53'; Molino 90+3'	Stadium: Beavercreek Stadium; Attendance: 275; Referee: Joshua Brooks

June 28, 2014 16	Orlando City	3–0	LA Galaxy II	Lake Buena Vista, Florida
7:30 p.m.	Hertzog 18', 43'; Molino 61'	Report; Match Replay		Stadium: Hess Field 17, ESPN WWOS; Attendance: 5,029; Referee: Patrick O'Brian

July 3, 2014 17	Wilmington Hammerheads	v	Orlando City	Wilmington, North Carolina
7:30 p.m.		Match postponed due to weather		Stadium: Legion Stadium

July 12, 2014 18	Orlando City	2–0	Wilmington Hammerheads	Lake Buena Vista, Florida
7:30 p.m.	Chin 32'; Pulis 49' (pen.)	Report; Match Replay		Stadium: Hess Field 17, ESPN WWOS; Attendance: 4,919; Referee: Lance Vanhaitsma

July 17, 2014 19	Sacramento Republic	0–0	Orlando City	Sacramento, California
10:30 p.m.	Alvarez (red card) 79'	Report; Match Replay		Stadium: Bonney Field, Cal Expo; Attendance: 8,000; Referee: Matthew Buckman

July 27, 2014 20	Rochester Rhinos	1–0	Orlando City	Rochester, New York
4:05 p.m.	Rolfe 31'; Walls 90'	Report	Ceren (yellow card) 80'; Boden (yellow card) 88'	Stadium: Sahlen's Stadium; Attendance: 8,378; Referee: Democratis Pashalidis

August 2, 2014 21	Orlando City	4–1	Charlotte Eagles	Lake Buena Vista, Florida
7:30 p.m.	Chin 45+1'; Turner 48'; Molino 51' (pen.), 60'	Report; Match Replay	Thompson 75'	Stadium: Hess Field 17, ESPN WWOS; Attendance: 5,029; Referee: Christina Unkel

August 9, 2014 22	Harrisburg City Islanders	3–2	Orlando City	Harrisburg, Pennsylvania
6:00 p.m.	Derschang 21', 30'; Hoppenot 53'	Report; Match Replay	Molino 81'; Gentile 87'	Stadium: Skyline Sports Complex; Referee: Charles Murphy

August 16, 2014 23	Orlando City	3–1	Harrisburg City Islanders	Lake Buena Vista, Florida
7:30 p.m.	Ceren 8', 89'; Molino 19'	Report; Match Replay	Derschang 6'	Stadium: Hess Field 17, ESPN WWOS; Attendance: 5,029; Referee: Patrick O'Brian

August 20, 2014 24	Charlotte Eagles	2–0	Orlando City	Charlotte, North Carolina
7:00 p.m.	Thompson 72', 90+2'	Report; Match Replay		Stadium: Dickson Field; Attendance: 498; Referee: Doug Hartemann

August 23, 2014 25	Richmond Kickers	2–3	Orlando City	Richmond, Virginia
7:00 p.m.	Davis 53'; Robinson 78'	Report; Match Replay	Estrela 7'; Molino 52'; Ramos 70'	Stadium: City Stadium; Attendance: 3,562; Referee: Matthew Franz

August 28, 2014 17R	Wilmington Hammerheads	3–1	Orlando City	Wilmington, North Carolina
7:30 p.m.	Bone 3'; Kaye 60'; Ochoa 90+2'	Report; Match Replay	da Luz 41'	Stadium: Legion Stadium; Attendance: 1,784; Referee: Jeremy Smith

August 31, 2014 26	Orlando City	7–0	Dayton Dutch Lions	Lake Buena Vista, Florida
7:30 p.m.	Molino 6', 40', 57'; Gentile 38' da Luz 49', 69'; Mbengue 60'	Report; Match Replay		Stadium: Hess Field 17, ESPN WWOS; Attendance: 4,810; Referee: Stefan McHardy

September 3, 2014 27	Wilmington Hammerheads	0–0	Orlando City	Wilmington, North Carolina
7:30 p.m.		Report; Match Replay		Stadium: Legion Stadium; Attendance: 2,184; Referee: Matthew Jozaitis

September 6, 2014 28	Orlando City	1–0	Richmond Kickers	Lake Buena Vista, Florida
7:30 p.m.	Molino 22'	Report; Match Replay		Stadium: Hess Field 17, ESPN WWOS; Attendance: 4,400; Referee: Rubiel Vasquez

===== Standings =====
Pos	Team	Pld	W	T	L	GF	GA	GD	Pts	Qualification
1	Orlando City (C)	28	19	5	4	56	24	+32	62	Commissioner's Cup, Playoffs
2	Sacramento Republic FC (A)	28	17	4	7	49	28	+21	55	Playoffs
3	LA Galaxy II (A)	28	15	6	7	54	38	+16	51	Playoffs
4	Richmond Kickers (A)	28	13	12	3	53	28	+25	51	Playoffs
5	Charleston Battery (A)	28	11	8	9	36	31	+5	41	Playoffs

Source: USL Pro official standings
Rules for classification: 1) points; 2) goal difference; 3) number of goals scored.
(A) Advances to USL Pro Playoffs; (C) Commissioner's Cup (best regular season record)

==== USL Pro Playoffs ====
Quarterfinals
1	Orlando City	0
8	Harrisburg City Islanders	1
4	Richmond Kickers (a.e.t.)	2
5	Charleston Battery	1
2	Sacramento Republic	4
7	Wilmington Hammerheads	1
3	LA Galaxy II	2
6	Rochester Rhinos	1

Semifinals
8	Harrisburg City Islanders	3
4	Richmond Kickers	2
2	Sacramento Republic	3
3	LA Galaxy II	2

USL Pro Championship
8	Harrisburg City Islanders	0
2	Sacramento Republic	2

September 13, 2014 QF	Orlando City	0–1	Harrisburg City Islanders	Lake Buena Vista, Florida
7:30pm		Report; Match Replay	Hoppenhot 39'; Derschang (red card) 90+5'	Stadium: Hess Field 17, ESPN WWOS; Attendance: 4,855; Referee: Matthew Miscannon

=== U.S. Open Cup ===
Orlando City entered the U.S. Open Cup in the second round.

May 14, 2014 2R	Orlando City	4–1	Ocala Stampede	Sanford, Florida
7:30pm	Hertzog 14', 44' (pen.); Chin 28', 83'	Report	Knight 61'	Stadium: Seminole Soccer Complex

May 28, 2014 3R	Orlando City	4–1	Tampa Bay Rowdies	Sanford, Florida
8:00pm	Molino 11', 41' da Luz 22'; Mbengue 26'	Report	Wagner 45'; Hill (red card) 87'	Stadium: Seminole Soccer Complex

June 17, 2014 4R	Colorado Rapids	5–2	Orlando City	Commerce City, Colorado
9:00pm	Brown 32', 47', 54'; LaBrocca 41'; Powers 74'; Mari (yellow card) 78'	Report	Mbengue 22', (yellow card) 68'; Boden 71'; Ceren (yellow card) 77'	Stadium: Dick's Sporting Goods Park

== Club ==
=== Roster ===
No.	Position	Nation	Player
1	GK	MEX	Miguel Gallardo (captain)
2	DF	USA	Tyler Turner
3	DF	USA	Brad Rusin
4	DF	USA	Tommy Redding
5	DF	POR	Rafael Ramos
6	MF	WAL	Anthony Pulis
8	MF	SEN	Adama Mbengue
9	FW	USA	Giuseppe Gentile
11	FW	USA	Corey Hertzog
12	MF	ENG	Harrison Heath
13	MF	USA	Austin da Luz
14	DF	ENG	Luke Boden
15	FW	USA	Dennis Chin
16	MF	USA	Aodhan Quinn
17	MF	ESA	Darwin Ceren
18	MF	TTO	Kevin Molino
19	DF	HAI	Bitielo Jean Jacques
21	GK	USA	Carl Woszczynski
22	DF	USA	Rob Valentino
23	DF	USA	Justin Clark
24	MF	ANG	Estrela
25	MF	USA	Ian Christianson
26	GK	USA	Rafael Díaz
27	MF	USA	Brian Span (on loan from FC Dallas)

=== Squad information ===
No.	Nat.	Player	Birthday	Previous club	2014 USL Pro appearances	2014 USL Pro goals
Goalkeepers
1	(Mexico)	Miguel Gallardo	October 24, 1984 (age 42)	(United States) Austin Lightning	24	–
21	(United States)	Carl Woszczynski	April 18, 1988 (age 38)	(United States) Los Angeles Blues	4	–
26	(United States)	Rafael Díaz	October 8, 1991 (age 35)	(United States) St. John's University	–	–
Defenders
2	(United States)	Tyler Turner	March 4, 1996 (age 30)	(United States) IMG Academy Bradenton	23	1
3	(United States)	Brad Rusin	September 5, 1986 (age 40)	(Canada) Vancouver Whitecaps FC	23	2
4	(United States)	Tommy Redding	January 24, 1997 (age 29)	(United States) FC America	15	–
5	(Portugal)	Rafael Ramos	January 9, 1995 (age 31)	(Portugal) S.L. Benfica U-19	4	1
7	(United States)	Bryan Burke	January 3, 1989 (age 37)	(United States) Los Angeles Blues	7	–
14	(England)	Luke Boden	November 26, 1988 (age 37)	(England) Sheffield Wednesday F.C.	23	2
19	(Haiti)	Bitielo Jean Jacques	December 28, 1990 (age 35)	(United States) VSI Tampa Bay FC	7	–
22	(United States)	Rob Valentino	December 21, 1985 (age 40)	(United States) Tampa Bay Rowdies	19	1
23	(United States)	Justin Clark	October 17, 1988 (age 38)	(United States) Rollins College	13	–
Midfielders
6	(Wales)	Anthony Pulis	July 21, 1984 (age 42)	(England) Aldershot Town F.C.	12	1
8	(Senegal)	Adama Mbengue	December 1, 1993 (age 32)	(United States) Orlando City U-23	27	3
10	(Cuba)	Yordany Álvarez#	May 24, 1985 (age 41)	(United States) Real Salt Lake	13	1
12	(England)	Harrison Heath	April 16, 1996 (age 30)	(England) Norwich City U-18	7	–
13	(United States)	Austin da Luz	October 9, 1987 (age 39)	(United States) Carolina RailHawks	18	5
16	(United States)	Aodhan Quinn	March 22, 1992 (age 34)	(United States) Philadelphia Union	16	–
17	(El Salvador)	Darwin Ceren	December 31, 1989 (age 36)	(El Salvador) Juventud Independiente	23	2
18	(Trinidad and Tobago)	Kevin Molino	June 17, 1990 (age 36)	(Trinidad and Tobago) Ma Pau SC	27	20
20	(United States)	Mikey Lopez	February 20, 1993 (age 33)	(United States) Sporting Kansas City†	9	–
24	(Republic of Ireland)	James O'Connor#	September 1, 1979 (age 47)	(England) Sheffield Wednesday F.C.	1	–
24	(Angola)	Estrela	September 22, 1995 (age 31)	(Portugal) S.L. Benfica U-19	5	1
25	(United States)	Ian Christianson	March 6, 1991 (age 35)	(United States) New York Red Bulls	3	–
27	(United States)	Brian Span	February 23, 1992 (age 34)	(United States) FC Dallas	19	1
Forwards
9	(United States)	Giuseppe Gentile	October 18, 1992 (age 34)	(United States) Chicago Fire	11	2
15	(United States)	Dennis Chin	June 4, 1987 (age 39)	(United States) Central Florida Kraze	26	5
11	(United States)	Corey Hertzog	August 1, 1990 (age 36)	(Canada) Vancouver Whitecaps FC	21	4

† = Denotes players on loan through USL Pro-MLS Reserve League alliance
# = Denotes players who retired during the season

=== Preseason Trialists ===
- 2 — Ashani Fairclough
- 3 — Mason Trafford
- 9 — Adrián Ruelas
- 11 — Miguel Ibarra
- 16 — R. J. Allen
- 20 — Romena Bowie

== Transfers ==
=== In ===
- (United States) Aodhan Quinn was signed on free transfer on March 19, 2014. He was selected by Philadelphia Union in the third round of the 2014 MLS SuperDraft, but did not sign with the club.
- (Brazil) Kaká was signed as Orlando City's first Designated Player on free transfer on July 1, 2014, after being released from A.C. Milan.
- (United States) Giuseppe Gentile was signed on free transfer on July 11, 2014. He was released from Chicago Fire following a loan with Charlotte Eagles.
- (England) Harrison Heath was signed on free transfer on July 17, 2014.
- (Portugal) Rafael Ramos was signed on August 7, 2014, on transfer from S.L. Benfica Juniors.
- (Angola) Vladomiro Lameira, also known as "Estrela", was signed on August 7, 2014, on transfer from S.L. Benfica Juniors.

=== Out ===
- (United States) Jamie Watson was transferred to Minnesota United FC for an undisclosed sum on February 20, 2014.
- (Sierra Leone) Joseph Toby was transferred to Arizona United SC for future considerations on April 9, 2014.
- (Republic of Ireland) James O'Connor retired on June 3, 2014, to assume the role of manager at Louisville City FC.

=== Loan in ===
- (Cuba) Yordany Álvarez, on loan from Real Salt Lake. Orlando City also has a transfer in place, where they will acquire Álvarez for the 2015 MLS season in exchange for their lowest 4th-round 2017 MLS SuperDraft pick. The agreement was terminated on August 29, 2014, when Álvarez retired for medical reasons following a collapse during a June 7 match.
- (United States) Mikey Lopez, on loan from Sporting Kansas City via the USL Pro-MLS Reserve League alliance
- (United States) Brian Span, on loan from FC Dallas. He was recalled on June 8, 2014, but returned to Orlando City after one match.
- (United States) Ian Christianson, on loan from New York Red Bulls.

=== Loan out ===
- (Brazil) Kaká, loaned out for six months to São Paulo, his hometown club. Kaka will then start play with Orlando City on January 1, 2015 in preparation for the Club's inaugural MLS season.

== Media ==
For the 2014 season, all matches will stream live on YouTube. The team's webcasts in 2014 are produced with assistance from the ESPN Innovation Lab. Occasional matches will appear on Bright House Sports Network. Some home matches can be heard on the radio as well, either 740 the Game or 102.5/107.7-HD2 WLOQ.

== See also ==
- 2014 in American soccer
- 2014 USL Pro season
- Orlando City
