= 2014 New York Red Bulls season =

New York Red Bulls
2014 season
- Sporting director: Andy Roxburgh
- Head coach: Mike Petke
- MLS: 4th – Eastern
- U.S. Open Cup: Fourth round
- MLS Cup: Finals
- CONCACAF Champions League: Group
- Top goalscorer: League: Bradley Wright-Phillips (27); All: Bradley Wright-Phillips (31)
- Highest home attendance: Overall: 25,219 vs Arsenal (July 26); Season: 23,776 vs Chicago Fire (May 10)
- Lowest home attendance: 13,278 vs Houston Dynamo (April 23)
- Average home league attendance: 18,517
Home colors	Away colors

The 2014 New York Red Bulls season was the Red Bulls' nineteenth season in Major League Soccer, the top division for soccer in the United States.

In 2014, the Red Bulls participated in the CONCACAF Champions League for the second time in team history (the first time being 2010). The team also entered the 2014 MLS season as the reigning Supporters Shield winners.

== Background ==
The previous season saw the Red Bulls under new leadership with both former general manager Erik Solér and head coach Hans Backe not being given contract extensions and thus relieved from their duties. They were replaced by Jérôme de Bontin, who took over as general manager, Andy Roxburgh as sporting director, and then-assistant coach Mike Petke as new head coach. During the winter pre-season the club made numerous roster moves with several regulars such as Sébastien Le Toux, Joel Lindpere, Wilman Conde, and Kenny Cooper leaving the team. The club also released disappointing designated player Rafael Márquez. In terms of notable signings, the team managed to sign in Fabián Espíndola, Jámison Olave, former Brazil international Juninho, Eric Alexander, Jonny Steele, and former France international Péguy Luyindula.

It took the Red Bulls five games before finally winning their first match of the 2013 MLS season against the Philadelphia Union at Red Bull Arena by a score of 2–1 on March 30. A 4–0 victory over the Montreal Impact at Red Bull Arena on July 13 turned out to be the turning point for the Red Bulls season as from then on the Red Bulls went on to win eight of their last fourteen games that season and thus secure the Supporters Shield on October 27 in their last match against the Chicago Fire at Red Bull Arena. However, despite winning the Supporters Shield, the Red Bulls failed to make it farther than that as the team were eliminated from the 2013 MLS Cup Playoffs by the Houston Dynamo in the first round they played in.

== Roster transactions ==
=== Pre-season ===
The first roster move by the Red Bulls was announced on November 21, 2013, when it was announced that two-time MLS Cup winning goalkeeper Kevin Hartman had decided to retire from the game. Then, four days later, it was announced that the team had decided to decline the contract options of defenders David Carney and Brandon Barklage. Then on November 27, the Red Bulls announced another departure from the team by parting ways with defender Heath Pearce.

The Red Bulls then announced their first non-departure news of the off-season on December 4 when they announced that defender Kosuke Kimura, midfielder Eric Alexander, and forward Péguy Luyindula had all re-signed with the team. Then on December 10 it was announced by Major League Soccer that the Red Bulls had also declined the contract option on forwards Fabián Espíndola and Andre Akpan when they released the list of eligible players for the 2013 MLS Re-Entry Draft. However, on December 12 it was announced that Akpan had re-signed with the Red Bulls.

The Red Bulls first signing of the season came on December 13 when they signed former American international Bobby Convey from Toronto FC in a trade for the Red Bulls' first-round pick in the 2014 MLS SuperDraft and first-round pick in the 2016 Supplemental Draft. The Red Bulls also got Toronto FC's second-round pick in the 2014 SuperDraft in the trade. The Red Bulls then re-signed goalkeeper Luis Robles and defender Roy Miller on December 16 before parting ways with defender Markus Holgersson on January 2, 2014.

Then, right before pre-season training began, the Red Bulls signed Spanish defender Armando Lozano from Córdoba before signing English fullback Richard Eckersley via a trade with Toronto FC for the Red Bulls fourth round pick in the 2017 MLS SuperDraft. Then, on January 29, it was announced that 2013 Team Defensive Player of the Year Jámison Olave had re-signed for the Red Bulls.

Finally, on March 6, right before the season began, the Red Bulls announced the signings of Cameroonian defender Ambroise Oyongo and draft picks Chris Duvall and Eric Stevenson.

=== During the season ===
The Red Bulls made their first roster transaction during the season on July 10 when they mutually agreed to part ways with midfielder Jonny Steele. Steele went on to sign for the Newcastle Jets of the A-League three days later. Then, later during the month of July, the Red Bulls sent out midfielders Ian Christianson and Connor Lade to Orlando City of the USL Pro and New York Cosmos of the NASL respectively in order to gain more game time.

The Red Bulls then made their first signing of the summer transfer window on July 28 when they secured the signature of trialist Damien Perrinelle for the remainder of the season. Two weeks later the Red Bulls traded Andre Akpan to the New England Revolution for Saër Sène.

=== In ===
#	Position:	Player	Signed from	Details	Date	Source
15	MF	(United States) Bobby Convey	(Canada) Toronto FC	Trade for 2014 MLS SuperDraft 1st round pick and 2016 Supplemental Draft pick	December 13, 2013	
5	DF	(Spain) Armando Lozano	(Spain) Córdoba	Signed on a free transfer	January 23, 2014	
2	DF	(England) Richard Eckersley	(Canada) Toronto FC	Trade for 2017 MLS SuperDraft fourth round pick	January 27, 2014	
3	DF	(Cameroon) Ambroise Oyongo	(Cameroon) Coton Sport	Signed after pre-season	March 6, 2014	
19	MF	(United States) Eric Stevenson	Draft pick	Signed after pre-season	March 6, 2014	
25	DF	(United States) Chris Duvall	Draft pick	Signed after pre-season	March 6, 2014	
55	DF	(France) Damien Perrinelle	(France) Istres	Signed after a trial	July 28, 2014	
39	FW	(France) Saër Sène	(United States) New England Revolution	Traded for Andre Akpan and allocation money	August 12, 2014	

=== Out ===
#	Position:	Player	Signed by	Details	Date	Source
1	GK	(United States) Kevin Hartman	Retired		November 21, 2013	
8	DF	(Australia) David Carney	(Australia) Newcastle Jets	Option declined	November 25, 2013	
25	DF	(United States) Brandon Barklage	(United States) San Jose Earthquakes	Option declined	November 25, 2013	
3	DF	(United States) Heath Pearce	(Canada) Montreal Impact	Released	November 27, 2013	
9	FW	(Argentina) Fabián Espíndola	(United States) D.C. United	Option declined	December 10, 2013	
5	DF	(Sweden) Markus Holgersson	(England) Wigan Athletic	Released	January 2, 2014	
19	FW	(United States) Amando Moreno	(Mexico) Club Tijuana	Mutual Decision	February 19, 2014	
22	MF	(Northern Ireland) Jonny Steele	(Australia) Newcastle Jets	Mutual Decision	July 10, 2014	
9	FW	(United States) Andre Akpan	(United States) New England Revolution	Traded for Saër Sène and international spot	August 12, 2014	

=== Loaned out ===
#	Position:	Player	Loaned to	Date	Source
6	MF	(United States) Ian Christianson	(United States) Orlando City	July 25, 2014	
16	DF	(United States) Connor Lade	(United States) New York Cosmos	July 26, 2014	

=== Re-signed ===
#	Position:	Player	Date	Source
27	DF	(Japan) Kosuke Kimura	December 4, 2013	
12	MF	(United States) Eric Alexander	December 4, 2013	
8	FW	(France) Péguy Luyindula	December 4, 2013	
15	FW	(United States) Andre Akpan	December 12, 2013	
31	GK	(United States) Luis Robles	December 16, 2013	
7	DF	(Costa Rica) Roy Miller	December 16, 2013	
4	DF	(Colombia) Jámison Olave	January 29, 2014	

=== Draft picks ===
Round	#	Position	Player	College/Club Team	Reference
2 (22)	—	DF	(United States) Chris Duvall	Wake Forest University	
2 (34)	—	MF	(United States) Eric Stevenson	University of Akron	

== Team information ==
=== Squad information ===
As of July 29, 2014.

No.	Name	Nationality	Position	Date of birth (age)	Previous club
Goalkeepers
18	Ryan Meara	(United States)	GK	November 15, 1990 (age 36)	(United States) Fordham University
24	Santiago Castaño	(United States)	GK	April 14, 1995 (age 31)	Academy
31	Luis Robles	(United States)	GK	May 11, 1984 (age 42)	(Germany) Karlsruher SC
Defenders
2	Richard Eckersley	(England)	RB	March 12, 1989 (age 37)	(Canada) Toronto FC
3	Ambroise Oyongo	(Cameroon)	LB	June 22, 1991 (age 35)	(Cameroon) Coton Sport
4	Jámison Olave	(Colombia)	CB	April 21, 1981 (age 45)	(United States) Real Salt Lake
5	Armando Lozano	(Spain)	CB	December 16, 1984 (age 41)	(Spain) Córdoba
7	Roy Miller	(Costa Rica)	LB	November 24, 1984 (age 41)	(Norway) Rosenborg
20	Matt Miazga	(United States)	RB	July 19, 1995 (age 31)	Academy
25	Chris Duvall	(United States)	DF	September 10, 1991 (age 35)	(United States) Wake Forest University
27	Kosuke Kimura	(Japan)	RB	May 14, 1984 (age 42)	(United States) Portland Timbers
32	Ibrahim Sekagya	(Uganda)	CB	December 19, 1980 (age 45)	(Austria) Red Bull Salzburg
55	Damien Perrinelle	(France)	CB	September 12, 1983 (age 43)	(France) Istres
Midfielders
10	Lloyd Sam	(England)	MF	September 27, 1984 (age 42)	(England) Leeds United
11	Dax McCarty	(United States)	CM	April 30, 1987 (age 39)	(United States) D.C. United
12	Eric Alexander	(United States)	RM	April 14, 1988 (age 38)	(United States) Portland Timbers
13	Marius Obekop	(Cameroon)	MF	December 19, 1994 (age 31)	(Cameroon) Renaissance
15	Bobby Convey	(United States)	MF	May 27, 1983 (age 43)	(Canada) Toronto FC
17	Tim Cahill	(Australia)	CAM	December 6, 1979 (age 46)	(England) Everton
19	Eric Stevenson	(United States)	MF	August 30, 1990 (age 36)	(United States) University of Akron
21	Ruben Bover	(Spain)	MF	June 24, 1992 (age 34)	(England) Charlton Athletic
23	Michael Bustamante	(Colombia)	MF	September 21, 1989 (age 37)	(United States) Boston University
Forwards
8	Péguy Luyindula	(France)	ST	May 25, 1979 (age 47)	(France) Paris Saint-Germain
14	Thierry Henry	(France)	ST	August 17, 1977 (age 49)	(Spain) Barcelona
39	Saër Sène	(France)	ST	November 4, 1986 (age 40)	(United States) New England Revolution
99	Bradley Wright-Phillips	(England)	FW	March 12, 1985 (age 41)	(England) Charlton Athletic

== Pre-season and Friendlies ==
=== Pre-season ===
On January 9 it was confirmed that the Red Bulls would begin their pre-season preparation on January 24 before heading off to Orlando on January 27. On January 23 the official pre-season roster was revealed by the Red Bulls. On February 5 the team's first friendly was official announced to be against the Philadelphia Union on February 12 at EverBank Field. The team went on to win that match-up 2–1 thanks to goals from Lloyd Sam and Thierry Henry; the Union goal coming from Jack McInerney. However, seven days later, the team lost their next pre-season match to the previous season's MLS Cup champions Sporting Kansas City 0–1 in the opening match of the 2014 Walt Disney World Pro Soccer Classic. Despite the defeat, head coach Mike Petke still commented positively about the defense saying that "We had long spells without the ball, but Kansas City never really threatened, which we wanted to see from our guys. Get into good defensive shape and then we exploded out of that for three or four opportunities."

Three days after losing their opener in the pre-season tournament the Red Bulls went on to win 3–0 over the Montreal Impact. Roy Miller, Ruben Bover, and Bradley Wright-Phillips were the goalscorers in this match. The Red Bulls and Ruben Bover both continued their good form when the team defeated the Fluminense U23 side 1–0 thanks to a goal from Bover. The team then finished off their pre-season with an emphatic 4–4 draw to future MLS newcomers Orlando City SC. Wright-Phillips scored a double while Jonny Steele and Ibrahim Sekagya scored the other two goals to round the pre-season off.

February 12, 2014 Friendly	New York Red Bulls	2–1	Philadelphia Union	Jacksonville, Florida
	Sam 8'; Henry 36'; Alexander (yellow card) 80'	Report	McInerney 29'	Stadium: EverBank Field; Referee: Chris Penso

February 19, 2014 Pro Soccer Classic	New York Red Bulls	0–1	Sporting Kansas City	Lake Buena Vista, Florida
	Bustamante (yellow card) 71'	Report	Peterson 65'	Stadium: ESPN Wide World of Sports Complex

February 22, 2014 Pro Soccer Classic	New York Red Bulls	3–0	Montreal Impact	Lake Buena Vista, Florida
	Miller 45'; McCarty (yellow card) 49'; Bover 68'; Wright-Phillips 69'	Report	Warner (yellow card) 35'; Romero (yellow card) 42'; Bernardello (yellow card) 50'	Stadium: ESPN Wide World of Sports Complex

February 26, 2014 Pro Soccer Classic	New York Red Bulls	1–0	Fluminense U23	Lake Buena Vista, Florida
	Henry (yellow card) 55'; Bover 74'	Report		Stadium: ESPN Wide World of Sports Complex

March 1, 2014 Pro Soccer Classic	New York Red Bulls	4–4	Orlando City	Lake Buena Vista, Florida
	Wright-Phillips 29', 52'; Armando (yellow card) 42'; Sekagya 68'; Steele 80'	Report	Hertzog 7'; Chin 47'; Álvarez (yellow card) 67'; Mbengue 76'; Molino 86'	Stadium: ESPN Wide World of Sports Complex

=== Summer friendlies ===
On March 26 it was announced that the Red Bulls would play a summer friendly match against English Premier League side Arsenal at Red Bull Arena on July 26. The friendly match ended 1–0 to the Red Bulls. The goal came from a Thierry Henry corner which was headed by Ibrahim Sekagya to Bradley Wright-Phillips who tucked-it into the back of the net.

July 26, 2014 Summer Friendly	New York Red Bulls	1–0	Arsenal	Harrison
5:00 EST	Wright-Phillips 32'	Report		Stadium: Red Bull Arena; Attendance: 25,219; Referee: Javier Santos

== Major League Soccer season ==
Following the 2013 season in which the Red Bulls won the Supporters' Shield, the team began the 2014 season with a 4–1 defeat against Vancouver Whitecaps FC at BC Place on March 8. Kenny Miller scored the first goal of the game from the penalty-spot for the Whitecaps in the 34th minute before Sebastián Fernández doubled the lead for Vancouver in the 49th minute. Kenny Miller then scored his second goal of the game and the third for Vancouver in the 77th minute of the match before Pedro Morales scored the fourth goal for the Whitecaps. Bradley Wright-Phillips scored the lone Red Bull goal in the 91st minute. The team then played their home opener son seven days later against the Colorado Rapids. The match ended in a 1–1 draw in which Thierry Henry opened the scoring in the 57th minute before the Rapids equalized through a Vicente Sánchez penalty. The next week the Red Bulls went back on the road to face the Chicago Fire where they drew the match once again 1–1. The Red Bulls went behind early in the sixth minute through Chicago's Jeff Larentowicz before Dax McCarty grabbed the Red Bull equalizer in the 21st minute. The Red Bulls then finished the month of March with yet another 1–1 draw, this time against Chivas USA who took the lead in the 25th minute through an Erick Torres penalty before Péguy Luyindula headed home the equalizer in the 95th minute.

The beginning of April started as March finished, with another draw. This time the draw result came away at the Montreal Impact at the Olympic Stadium. The game finished 2–2 with both Jonny Steele and Péguy Luyindula scoring for the Red Bulls and Andrés Romero and Felipe finding the net for Montreal. Unfortunately the team's fortunes did not improve as the Red Bulls fell to their second loss of the season in the very next match against rivals D.C. United at RFK Stadium. A fourth-minute strike from Davy Arnaud lead to the 1–0 defeat. However, in the next game, the Red Bulls managed to win their first match of the season against the Philadelphia Union at Red Bull Arena. Thierry Henry started the scoring in the 57th minute before Lloyd Sam doubled the score ten minutes later. Former Red Bull, Sébastien Le Toux, then managed to bring one back for the Union from the spot in the 80th minute but the Red Bulls managed to hang on for all three points. That result was then followed up with an even better result against the Houston Dynamo. In their first match since the Dynamo knocked the Red Bulls out of the MLS Cup the previous season the Red Bulls ran riot against the Dynamo, scoring four goals in a 4–0 rout. Bradley Wright-Phillips scored his first ever hat-trick for the Red Bulls while Thierry Henry scored one as well. The Red Bulls then finished the month off with a draw away from home against the Columbus Crew. A penalty from Jairo Arrieta and a late strike from Bradley Wright-Phillips lead to the 1–1 finish.

The month of May began on a good note for the Red Bulls with a 1–0 away win at FC Dallas at Toyota Stadium. Bradley Wright-Phillips managed to score his sixth goal of the season in the 71st minute to hand the Red Bulls the victory. However, that would be the Red Bulls' only victory of the month as the team then went on a three-game losing streak starting at home to the Chicago Fire. Another hat-trick from Bradley Wright-Phillips and a goal from Tim Cahill were not enough as Chicago found goals through Harrison Shipp, who scored a hat-trick too, Quincy Amarikwa and Patrick Nyarko to win 5–4. The second loss came against big offseason spenders Toronto FC away from home at BMO Field. Goals from English international Jermain Defoe and Luke Moore saw Toronto FC run out 2–0 winners. Finally the third loss came back at home against the Portland Timbers. The Red Bulls had taken the lead through a spot-kick goal from Bradley Wright-Phillips, his 10th of the season, before the Timbers scored twice from Maximiliano Urruti to leave the Red Bulls to a 2–1 defeat. The Red Bulls then returned to better results in their next match against Sporting Kansas City away from home. The match ended in a 1–1 draw thanks to Toni opening the scoring for Sporting in the 9th minute before Bradley Wright-Phillips equalized for the Red Bulls in the 50th minute to earn the Red Bulls the point.

The team then entered June with an away rivalry match-up against the New England Revolution at Gillette Stadium, a stadium the team has not won at since they were known as the MetroStars, however, that barren run was finally put to rest with this match. Goals from Eric Alexander and Péguy Luyindula as well as 10 saves from goalkeeper Luis Robles awarded the Red Bulls a 2–0 victory in Foxborough. The Red Bulls then went on a break from the MLS during the 2014 FIFA World Cup group stages and did not play again in MLS till June 27 when they took on recent high spenders Toronto FC at Red Bull Arena. The Red Bulls took the lead going into half-time thanks to a 36th-minute strike from Péguy Luyindula but Toronto FC then took the lead through goals from Jermain Defoe and Gilberto. The Red Bulls then came from behind for the draw with a 93rd minute Bradley Wright-Phillips goal to finish the game at 2–2.

The Red Bulls began the month of July with a road trip to the Houston Dynamo on July 4. Giles Barnes scored in the first minute for the Dynamo but the Red Bulls came back through a brace from Bradley Wright-Phillips. However, Brad Davis, scored to equalize for the Dynamo through an 81st-minute penalty and thus ended the game at 2–2. The Red Bulls then returned home to Red Bull Arena a week later to take on the Columbus Crew. Bradley Wright-Phillips scored his fifteenth goal of the season to open the scoring for the Red Bulls before Adam Bedell equalized for the Crew in the 39th minute. Thierry Henry then scored in the 45th minute to give the Red Bulls the lead before Lloyd Sam doubled the lead eleven minutes later. Eric Alexander added a fourth goal in the 91st minute to give the Red Bulls a 4–1 victory. However, despite the grand victory at home, the Red Bulls went back on the road four days later against the Philadelphia Union at PPL Park and lost 3–1. Conor Casey opened the scoring for the Union in the 9th minute before Fred scored the second goal of the game. Bradley Wright-Phillips brought one back for the Red Bulls in the 60th minute before former Red Bull Sébastien Le Toux scored the third and final goal of the game for the Union from the penalty spot. After the defeat the Red Bulls once again returned home to face the San Jose Earthquakes. Bradley Wright-Phillips scored his eighteenth goal of the season from the penalty spot in the 33rd minute before Steven Lenhart scored the equalizer in the 85th minute to have the match end 1–1.

After a quick club friendly with Premier League side Arsenal, the Red Bulls went on the road to face Real Salt Lake at Rio Tinto Stadium on July 30. Joao Plata scored the opening goal of the game for Salt Lake in the 18th minute before Thierry Henry scored the equalizer for the Red Bulls in the 57th minute. The match went on to end 1–1. The team then went into August with a match on August 2 against the New England Revolution at Red Bull Arena. After going down a goal in the 20th minute through Charlie Davies before Dax McCarty and Bradley Wright-Phillips scored for the Red Bulls to win 2–1. However, the victory was only short-lived as the Red Bulls lost 1–0 to the Chicago Fire at Toyota Field on August 10. Mike Magee scored for the Fire from the penalty spot.

=== Matches ===
March 8, 2014 1	Vancouver Whitecaps FC	4–1	New York Red Bulls	Vancouver
7:30 EST	Miller 34' (pen.), 77'; Fernández 49'; Morales 89'	Report	Wright-Phillips 90+1'	Stadium: BC Place; Attendance: 21,000; Referee: Abbey Okulaja

March 15, 2014 2	New York Red Bulls	1–1	Colorado Rapids	Harrison
4:00 EST	Henry 57'	Report	Sánchez 72'	Stadium: Red Bull Arena; Attendance: 20,542; Referee: Alan Kelly

March 23, 2014 3	Chicago Fire	1–1	New York Red Bulls	Bridgeview
3:00 EST	Larentowicz 6'	Report	McCarty 21'	Stadium: Toyota Park; Attendance: 16,228; Referee: Drew Fischer

March 30, 2014 4	New York Red Bulls	1–1	Chivas USA	Harrison
3:00 EST	Luyindula 90+5'	Report	Torres 25' (pen.)	Stadium: Red Bull Arena; Attendance: 15,225; Referee: Juan Guzman

April 5, 2014 5	Montreal Impact	2–2	New York Red Bulls	Montreal
4:00 EST	Andrés Romero 5'; Felipe 60'	Report	Steele 31'; Luyindula 34'	Stadium: Olympic Stadium; Attendance: 24,071; Referee: Silviu Petrescu

April 12, 2014 6	D.C. United	1–0	New York Red Bulls	Washington, D.C.
7:00 EST	Arnaud 4'	Report		Stadium: RFK Stadium; Attendance: 12,364; Referee: Allen Chapman

April 16, 2014 7	New York Red Bulls	2–1	Philadelphia Union	Harrison
7:30 EST	Henry 57'; Sam 67'	Report	Le Toux 80' (pen.)	Stadium: Red Bull Arena; Attendance: 14,768; Referee: Ricardo Salazar

April 23, 2014 8	New York Red Bulls	4–0	Houston Dynamo	Harrison
7:00 EST	Wright-Phillips 12', 24', 86' (pen.); Henry 65'	Report		Stadium: Red Bull Arena; Attendance: 13,278; Referee: Jair Marrufo

April 26, 2014 9	Columbus Crew	1–1	New York Red Bulls	Columbus
7:30 EST	Arrieta 39' (pen.)	Report	Wright-Phillips 66'	Stadium: Columbus Crew Stadium; Attendance: 18,026; Referee: Geoff Gamble

May 4, 2014 10	FC Dallas	0–1	New York Red Bulls	Frisco
3:00 EST		Report	Wright-Phillips 71'	Stadium: Toyota Stadium; Attendance: 17,105; Referee: Edvin Jurisevic

May 10, 2014 11	New York Red Bulls	4–5	Chicago Fire	Harrison
7:00 EST	Cahill 6'; Wright-Phillips 39', 67', 79' (pen.)	Report	Shipp 4', 54', 59'; Amarikwa 49'; Nyarko 64'	Stadium: Red Bull Arena; Attendance: 23,776; Referee: Kevin Scott

May 17, 2014 12	Toronto FC	2–0	New York Red Bulls	Toronto
4:30 EST	Defoe 12'; Moore 90+5'	Report		Stadium: BMO Field; Attendance: 22,591; Referee: Silviu Petrescu

May 24, 2014 13	New York Red Bulls	1–2	Portland Timbers	Harrison
7:00 EST	Wright-Phillips 36' (pen.)	Report	Urruti 45', 74'	Stadium: Red Bull Arena; Attendance: 19,513; Referee: Drew Fischer

May 27, 2014 14	Sporting Kansas City	1–1	New York Red Bulls	Kansas City
8:00 EST	Toni 9'	Report	Wright-Phillips 50'	Stadium: Sporting Park; Attendance: 19,221; Referee: Chris Penso

June 8, 2014 15	New England Revolution	0–2	New York Red Bulls	Foxborough
5:00 EST		Report	Alexander 17'; Luyindula 76'	Stadium: Gillette Stadium; Attendance: 23,950; Referee: Geoff Gamble

June 27, 2014 16	New York Red Bulls	2–2	Toronto FC	Harrison
8:00 EST	Luyindula 36'; Wright-Phillips 90+3'	Report	Defoe 55'; Gilberto 72'	Stadium: Red Bull Arena; Attendance: 20,176; Referee: Hilario Grajeda

July 4, 2014 17	Houston Dynamo	2–2	New York Red Bulls	Houston
8:30 EST	Barnes 1'; Davis 81' (pen.)	Report	Wright-Phillips 13', 71'	Stadium: BBVA Compass Stadium; Attendance: 22,312; Referee: Ismail Elfath

July 12, 2014 18	New York Red Bulls	4–1	Columbus Crew	Harrison
7:00 EST	Wright-Phillips 17'; Henry 45'; Sam 56'; Alexander 90+1'	Report	Bedell 39'	Stadium: Red Bull Arena; Attendance: 17,028; Referee: Ted Unkel

July 16, 2014 19	Philadelphia Union	3–1	New York Red Bulls	Chester
7:00 EST	Casey 9'; Fred 51'; Le Toux 69' (pen.)	Report	Wright-Phillips 60'	Stadium: PPL Park; Attendance: 18,541; Referee: Baldomero Toledo

July 19, 2014 20	New York Red Bulls	1–1	San Jose Earthquakes	Harrison
7:00 EST	Wright-Phillips 33' (pen.)	Report	Lenhart 85'	Stadium: Red Bull Arena; Attendance: 20,001; Referee: José Carlos Rivero

July 30, 2014 21	Real Salt Lake	1–1	New York Red Bulls	Sandy
9:00 EST	Plata 18'	Report	Henry 57'	Stadium: Rio Tinto Stadium; Attendance: 20,295; Referee: Mark Geiger

August 2, 2014 22	New York Red Bulls	2–1	New England Revolution	Harrison
7:00 EST	McCarty 48'; Wright-Phillips 63'	Report	Davies 20'	Stadium: Red Bull Arena; Attendance: 20,862; Referee: Allen Chapman

August 10, 2014 23	Chicago Fire	1–0	New York Red Bulls	Bridgeview
8:00 EST	Magee 38' (pen.)	Report		Stadium: Toyota Park; Attendance: 16,109; Referee: Ted Unkel

August 23, 2014 24	New York Red Bulls	4–2	Montreal Impact	Harrison
7:00 EST	Henry 53' 67'; Wright-Phillips 74' 90'	Report	Duka 37'; Romero 79'	Stadium: Red Bull Arena; Attendance: 17,891; Referee: Sorin Stoica

August 31, 2014 25	D.C. United	2–0	New York Red Bulls	Washington, D.C.
2:30 EST	Silva 57'; Johnson 90+1'	Report		Stadium: RFK Stadium; Attendance: 19,453; Referee: Jair Marrufo

September 6, 2014 26	New York Red Bulls	2–1	Sporting Kansas City	Harrison
7:30 EST	Wright-Phillips 11' (pen.); Henry 52'	Report	Dwyer 54'	Stadium: Red Bull Arena; Attendance: 20,831; Referee: Hilario Grajeda

September 10, 2014 27	New York Red Bulls	1–0	D.C. United	Harrison
8:00 EST	Sam 90'	Report		Stadium: Red Bull Arena; Attendance: 14,953; Referee: Mark Geiger

September 13, 2014 28	Philadelphia Union	2–2	New York Red Bulls	Chester
3:00 EST	Ribeiro 41'; Le Toux 90+2'	Report	Luyindula 37'; Henry 40'	Stadium: PPL Park; Attendance: 18,091; Referee: Allen Chapman

September 20, 2014 29	New York Red Bulls	4–1	Seattle Sounders FC	Harrison
7:30 EST	Wright-Phillips 1', 54' (pen.), 56'; Cahill 65'	Report	Dempsey 62'	Stadium: Red Bull Arena; Attendance: 25,000; Referee: Alan Kelly

September 28, 2014 30	LA Galaxy	4–0	New York Red Bulls	Carson
8:30 EST	Keane 8', 82'; Donovan 50'; Zardes 69'	Report		Stadium: StubHub Center; Attendance: 25,102; Referee: Armando Villarreal

October 4, 2014 31	New York Red Bulls	1–0	Houston Dynamo	Harrison
6:00 EST	Henry 47'	Report		Stadium: Red Bull Arena; Attendance: 21,569; Referee: Jair Marrufo

October 11, 2014 32	New York Red Bulls	3–1	Toronto FC	Harrison
7:00 EST	Wright-Phillips 26'; Izquierdo 35'; McCarty 44'	Report	Osorio 55'	Stadium: Red Bull Arena; Attendance: 24,068; Referee: Hilario Grajeda

October 19, 2014 33	New York Red Bulls	1–3	Columbus Crew	Harrison
3:00 EST	Sam 58'	Report	Schoenfeld 17', 80'; Finlay 34'	Stadium: Red Bull Arena; Attendance: 20,681; Referee: José Carlos Rivero

October 26, 2014 34	Sporting Kansas City	0–2	New York Red Bulls	Kansas City
8:30 EST		Report	Wright-Phillips 15', 70'	Stadium: Sporting Park; Attendance: 19,188; Referee: Armando Villarreal

=== Eastern Conference Table ===
Pos	Team	Pld	W	L	T	GF	GA	GD	Pts	Qualification
1	D.C. United	34	17	9	8	52	37	+15	59	Qualification for the conference semifinals
2	New England Revolution	34	17	13	4	51	37	+14	55	Qualification for the conference semifinals
3	Columbus Crew SC	34	14	10	10	52	42	+10	52	Qualification for the conference semifinals
4	New York Red Bulls	34	13	10	11	55	50	+5	50	Qualification for the knockout round
5	Sporting Kansas City	34	14	13	7	48	41	+7	49	Qualification for the knockout round
6	Philadelphia Union	34	10	12	12	51	51	0	42	
7	Toronto FC	34	11	15	8	44	54	−10	41	
8	Houston Dynamo	34	11	17	6	39	58	−19	39	
9	Chicago Fire	34	6	10	18	41	51	−10	36	
10	Montreal Impact	34	6	18	10	38	58	−20	28	

Source: MLS

=== Results summary ===
Overall								Home						Away					
Pld	W	D	L	GF	GA	GD	Pts	W	D	L	GF	GA	GD	W	D	L	GF	GA	GD
34	13	11	10	55	50	+5	50	10	4	3	38	23	+15	3	7	7	17	27	−10

Last updated: October 27, 2014.
Source: https://www.soccerway.com/team/new-york-red-bulls/zV5YmQAr/fixtures/

=== Results by round ===
Round	1	2	3	4	5	6	7	8	9	10	11	12	13	14	15	16	17	18	19	20	21	22	23	24	25	26	27	28	29	30	31	32	33	34
Stadium	A	H	A	H	A	A	H	H	A	A	H	A	H	A	A	H	A	H	A	H	A	H	A	H	A	H	H	A	H	A	H	H	H	A
Result	L	D	D	D	D	L	W	W	D	W	L	L	L	D	W	D	D	W	L	D	D	W	L	W	L	W	W	D	W	L	W	W	L	W

Updated to match(es) played on October 27, 2014. Source: int.soccerway.com
A = Away; H = Home; W = Win; D = Draw; L = Loss

=== MLS Cup Playoffs ===
==== Knockout round ====
October 30, 2014 Knockout Round	New York Red Bulls	2–1	Sporting Kansas City	Harrison
8:00 EST	Wright-Phillips 77', 90'	Report	Dwyer 53'	Stadium: Red Bull Arena; Attendance: 15,518; Referee: Armando Villarreal

==== Conference semifinals ====
November 2, 2014 Semifinals	New York Red Bulls	2–0	D.C. United	Harrison
4:00 EST	Wright-Phillips 40'; Luyindula 73'	Report		Stadium: Red Bull Arena; Attendance: 18,054; Referee: Hilario Grajeda

November 8, 2014 Semifinals	D.C. United	2–1 (2–3 agg.)	New York Red Bulls	Washington, D.C.
2:30 EST	DeLeon 37'; Franklin 90+1'	Report	Luyindula 57'	Stadium: RFK Stadium; Attendance: 20,187; Referee: Ismail Elfath

==== Conference finals ====
November 23, 2014 Finals	New York Red Bulls	1–2	New England Revolution	Harrison
1:30 EST	Wright-Phillips 27'	Report	Bunbury 17'; Jones 85'	Stadium: Red Bull Arena; Attendance: 25,000; Referee: Allen Chapman

November 29, 2014 Finals	New England Revolution	2–2 (4–3 agg.)	New York Red Bulls	Foxborough
3:00 EST	Davies 41', 70'	Report	Cahill 26'; Luyindula 52'	Stadium: Gillette Stadium; Attendance: 32,698; Referee: Baldomero Toledo

== U.S. Open Cup ==
The Red Bulls will enter the U.S. Open Cup in the fourth round due to being a Major League Soccer team. In May 2014 it was officially announced that the winner between the third-round fixture between the NASL's New York Cosmos and the NPSL's Brooklyn Italians would face the Red Bulls in the fourth round. That game took place on May 28 in which the Cosmos came out as 2–0 winners over the former Open Cup champions.

The Red Bulls then took on the Cosmos at James M. Shuart Stadium on June 14 which ended in a 3–0 defeat for the Red Bulls. Mads Stokkelien and Alessandro Noselli were the goal scorers for the Cosmos as they went on to the fifth round to face the Philadelphia Union.

June 14, 2014 Fourth round	New York Cosmos	3–0	New York Red Bulls	Hempstead
8:30 EST	Stokkelien 7', 73'; Noselli 78'	Report		Stadium: James M. Shuart Stadium; Attendance: 9,364

== CONCACAF Champions League ==
=== Group stage ===
On May 28 the Red Bulls were officially drawn into Group 3, along with fellow Major League Soccer side and recent Canadian Championship winners Montreal Impact, and Salvadoran Primera División side FAS.

Pos	Team	Pld	W	D	L	GF	GA	GD	Pts	Qualification	MTL	NYR	FAS
1	(Canada) Montreal Impact	4	3	1	0	6	3	+3	10	Advance to championship stage	—	1–0	1–0
2	(United States) New York Red Bulls	4	1	2	1	3	2	+1	5		1–1	—	2–0
3	(El Salvador) FAS	4	0	1	3	2	6	−4	1		2–3	0–0	—

Source: CONCACAF
Rules for classification: Group stage tiebreakers

August 26, 2014 1	New York Red Bulls (United States)	2–0	(El Salvador) FAS	Harrison
8:00 EDT	Sène 11'; Sam 70'	Report		Stadium: Red Bull Arena; Referee: John Pitti (Panama)

September 17, 2014 2	Montreal Impact (Canada)	1–0	(United States) New York Red Bulls	Montreal, Canada
8:00 EST	Di Vaio 16'	Report		Stadium: Saputo Stadium; Referee: Neal Brizan (Trinidad and Tobago)

September 24, 2014 3	FAS (El Salvador)	0–0	(United States) New York Red Bulls	San Salvador, Honduras
10:00 EST		Report		Stadium: Estadio Cuscatlán; Referee: Fernando Guerrero Ramirez (Mexico)

October 22, 2014 4	New York Red Bulls (United States)	1–1	(Canada) Montreal Impact	Harrison
8:00 EST	Lade 84'	Report	McInerney 71'	Stadium: Red Bull Arena; Referee: Héctor Francisco Rodríguez (Honduras)

== Player statistics ==
As of December 5, 2014

No.	Pos	Nat	Player	Total		MLS		MLS Cup		U.S. Open Cup		Champions League	
No.	Pos	Nat	Player	Apps	Goals	Apps	Goals	Apps	Goals	Apps	Goals	Apps	Goals
2	DF	(England) ENG	Richard Eckersley	17	0	8+1	0	5+0	0	0+0	0	3+0	0
3	DF	(Cameroon) CMR	Ambroise Oyongo	22	0	11+2	0	2+3	0	1+0	0	2+1	0
4	DF	(Colombia) COL	Jámison Olave	33	0	28+0	0	5+0	0	0+0	0	0+0	0
5	DF	(Spain) ESP	Armando Lozano	25	0	14+5	0	0+1	0	1+0	0	3+1	0
7	DF	(Costa Rica) CRC	Roy Miller	27	0	22+1	0	3+0	0	0+0	0	1+0	0
8	FW	(France) FRA	Péguy Luyindula	34	8	15+11	5	4+1	3	1+0	0	2+0	0
10	MF	(England) ENG	Lloyd Sam	40	5	32+0	4	5+0	0	1+0	0	2+0	1
11	MF	(United States) USA	Dax McCarty	39	3	29+2	3	5+0	0	0+0	0	1+2	0
12	MF	(United States) USA	Eric Alexander	43	2	30+4	2	5+0	0	1+0	0	1+2	0
13	MF	(Cameroon) CMR	Marius Obekop	5	0	0+2	0	0+0	0	0+0	0	2+1	0
14	FW	(France) FRA	Thierry Henry	35	10	30+0	10	5+0	0	0+0	0	0+0	0
15	MF	(United States) USA	Bobby Convey	14	0	9+4	0	0+0	0	0+1	0	0+0	0
17	MF	(Australia) AUS	Tim Cahill	29	3	18+5	2	2+3	1	0+0	0	1+0	0
18	GK	(United States) USA	Ryan Meara	5	0	0+0	0	0+0	0	1+0	0	4+0	0
19	MF	(United States) USA	Eric Stevenson	5	0	0+1	0	0+0	0	0+0	0	2+2	0
20	DF	(United States) USA	Matt Miazga	9	0	6+1	0	0+0	0	1+0	0	1+0	0
21	MF	(Spain) ESP	Ruben Bover	19	1	2+13	1	0+1	0	0+0	0	2+1	0
23	MF	(Colombia) COL	Michael Bustamante	1	0	0+0	0	0+0	0	0+1	0	0+0	0
24	GK	(United States) USA	Santiago Castaño	0	0	0+0	0	0+0	0	0+0	0	0+0	0
25	DF	(United States) USA	Chris Duvall	22	0	18+1	0	0+0	0	1+0	0	2+0	0
27	DF	(Japan) JPN	Kosuke Kimura	15	0	10+3	0	0+0	0	0+0	0	2+0	0
31	GK	(United States) USA	Luis Robles	39	0	34+0	0	5+0	0	0+0	0	0+0	0
32	DF	(Uganda) UGA	Ibrahim Sekagya	31	0	23+2	0	5+0	0	1+0	0	0+0	0
39	FW	(France) FRA	Saër Sène	9	1	0+5	0	0+0	0	0+0	0	4+0	1
55	DF	(France) FRA	Damien Perrinelle	6	0	0+2	0	0+0	0	0+0	0	4+0	0
99	FW	(England) ENG	Bradley Wright-Phillips	37	31	29+3	27	4+0	4	1+0	0	0+0	0
	MF	(United States) USA	Ian Christianson [Loaned]	6	0	0+3	0	0+0	0	0+0	0	3+0	0
	DF	(United States) USA	Connor Lade [Loaned]	10	1	0+6	0	0+2	0	0+0	0	2+0	1
	FW	(United States) USA	Andre Akpan [L]	6	0	0+5	0	0+0	0	0+1	0	0+0	0
	MF	(Northern Ireland) NIR	Jonny Steele [L]	16	1	6+9	1	0+0	0	1+0	0	0+0	0

- [Loaned] — Player has been loaned out for the season.
- [L] — Left the team mid-season.

=== Top scorers ===
Place	Position	Number	Name	MLS	MLS Cup	U.S. Open Cup	Champions League	Total
1	FW	99	(England) Bradley Wright-Phillips	27	4	0	0	31
2	FW	14	(France) Thierry Henry	10	0	0	0	10
3	FW	8	(France) Péguy Luyindula	5	3	0	0	8
4	MF	10	(England) Lloyd Sam	4	0	0	1	5
5	MF	11	(United States) Dax McCarty	3	0	0	0	3
5	MF	17	(Australia) Tim Cahill	2	1	0	0	3
6	MF	12	(United States) Eric Alexander	2	0	0	0	2
7	DF	16	(United States) Connor Lade	0	0	0	1	1
7	MF	21	(Spain) Ruben Bover	1	0	0	0	1
7	MF	22	(Northern Ireland) Jonny Steele	1	0	0	0	1
7	FW	39	(France) Saër Sène	0	0	0	1	1
Total				57	8	0	3	68

== See also ==
- 2014 in American soccer
