= 2014 Philadelphia Union season =

Philadelphia Union
2014 season
- Owner: Keystone Sports & Entertainment
- Head coach: Jim Curtin interim, from June 10, 2014 permanent, from November 7, 2014; John Hackworth until June 10, 2014
- Stadium: PPL Park (Capacity: 18,500)
- MLS: Eastern Conference: 6th Overall table: 12th
- MLS Cup Playoffs: Did not qualify
- U.S. Open Cup: Finals
- Top goalscorer: League: Sebastien Le Toux (12); All: Sebastien Le Toux (15)
- Highest home attendance: 18,843 v Vancouver; June 7, 2014
- Lowest home attendance: 14,838 v Chicago; October 2, 2014
- Average home league attendance: Regular season: 17,631
Home colors	Away colors	Third colors

The 2014 Philadelphia Union season was the club's fifth season of existence, competing in Major League Soccer, the top flight of American soccer. The club was initially managed by John Hackworth, in his third season (second full season) with the club. In June, Hackworth was fired from his role as head coach and assistant coach Jim Curtin was promoted on an interim basis. At the conclusion of the season, Curtin was officially made permanent head coach, making him the third head coach in the club's history. The 2014 season marked the first time the Union reached a competition finals, finishing runners-up in the 2014 U.S. Open Cup to Seattle Sounders FC.

== Roster ==
As of April 20, 2014.

Note: Flags indicate national team as defined under FIFA eligibility rules; some limited exceptions apply. Players may hold more than one non-FIFA nationality.

No.	Pos.	Nation	Player
1	GK	JAM	Andre Blake (GA)
4	DF	USA	Austin Berry
5	MF	FRA	Vincent Nogueira
6	FW	USA	Conor Casey
7	MF	USA	Brian Carroll (Captain)
9	FW	USA	Andrew Wenger
10	MF	ARG	Cristian Maidana (DP)
11	FW	FRA	Sébastien Le Toux
12	FW	USA	Aaron Wheeler
13	MF	USA	Michael Lahoud
14	MF	USA	Amobi Okugo (GA)
15	DF	USA	Ethan White
16	DF	USA	Richie Marquez
18	GK	USA	Zac MacMath (GA)
19	MF	USA	Corben Bone

No.	Pos.	Nation	Player
20	MF	USA	Jimmy McLaughlin (HGP)
21	MF	USA	Maurice Edu (DP, on loan from Stoke City)
22	MF	BRA	Leo Fernandes
23	MF	MEX	Cristhian Hernández (HGP)
24	GK	USA	Brian Holt
25	DF	USA	Sheanon Williams
26	MF	TTO	Keon Daniel
27	MF	USA	Zach Pfeffer (HGP)
28	DF	USA	Ray Gaddis
29	MF	USA	Antoine Hoppenot
30	DF	USA	Pedro Ribiero
33	DF	BRA	Fabinho
44	MF	USA	Danny Cruz
45	GK	ALG	Raïs M'Bolhi

== Competitions ==
=== Preseason ===
February 4, 2014 Preseason	Philadelphia Union	1–1	New England Revolution	Deltona, Florida
3:00 p.m. EDT	McInerney 44'	Report	Melo 60', (yellow card) 90'; Caldwell (yellow card) 79'	Stadium: Dewey O. Boster Sports Complex

February 12, 2014 Preseason	Philadelphia Union	1–2	New York Red Bulls	Jacksonville, Florida
6:00 p.m. EDT	McInerney 29'	Report	Sam 8'; Henry 35'; Alexander (yellow card) 80'	Stadium: EverBank Field; Attendance: 5,656; Referee: Chris Penso

February 19, 2014 Disney Soccer Classic	Orlando City SC	1–1	Philadelphia Union	Lake Buena Vista, Florida
6:00 p.m. EDT	Hertzog 31'; Boden (yellow card) 53'	Report	Fernandes 72'	Stadium: ESPN Wide World of Sports Complex

February 22, 2014 Disney Soccer Classic	Philadelphia Union	0–1	Columbus Crew	Lake Buena Vista, Florida
1:00 p.m. EDT		Report	Higuaín 87' (pen.)	Stadium: ESPN Wide World of Sports Complex

February 26, 2014 Disney Soccer Classic	Philadelphia Union	0–0	Toronto FC	Lake Buena Vista, Florida
1:00 p.m. EDT	Okugo (yellow card) 63'; Carroll (yellow card) 71'	Report	Morgan (yellow card) 55'	Stadium: ESPN Wide World of Sports Complex

March 1, 2014 Disney Soccer Classic 5th Place Match	Philadelphia Union	1–1 (4–1 p)	Montreal Impact	Lake Buena Vista, Florida
3:00 p.m. EDT	McInerney 29'	Report	Di Vaio 80'	Stadium: ESPN Wide World of Sports Complex
	Penalties
	Fernandes (penalty scored); Wheeler (penalty scored); Carroll (penalty scored); Nogueira (penalty scored)		(penalty missed) Di Vaio; (penalty missed) Bernier; (penalty scored) Bernardello

=== MLS ===
March 8, 2014 Regular Season	Portland Timbers	1–1	Philadelphia Union	Portland, Oregon
10:30 p.m. EDT	Chara (yellow card) 88'; Fernández 90+4'		Fabinho (yellow card) 15'; McInerney (yellow card) 59' (goal) 64'; Gaddis (yellow card) 75'	Stadium: Providence Park; Attendance: 20,814; Referee: Ioannis Stavridis

March 15, 2014 Regular Season	Philadelphia Union	1–0	New England Revolution	Chester, Pennsylvania
4:00 p.m. EDT	McInerney (yellow card) 10'; Le Toux 31'; Berry (yellow card) 48'		Soares (yellow card) 70'	Stadium: PPL Park; Attendance: 18,651; Referee: Kevin Morrison

March 22, 2014 Regular Season	Columbus Crew	2–1	Philadelphia Union	Columbus, Ohio
6:00 p.m. EDT	Anor 24' 45+2'; Higuaín (yellow card) 81'		Fernandes 62'; Fabinho (yellow card) 74'	Stadium: Crew Stadium; Attendance: 17,517; Referee: Ted Unkel

March 29, 2014 Regular Season	Philadelphia Union	1–1	Montreal Impact	Chester, Pennsylvania
4:00 p.m. EDT	Nogueira 35'; Fabinho (yellow card) 48'		Camara (yellow card) 26'; Warner (yellow card) 36'; Ferrari (yellow card) 65'; Wenger (red card) 76'; Di Vaio 80'	Stadium: PPL Park; Attendance: 15,691; Referee: Edvin Jurisevic

April 5, 2014 Regular Season	Chicago Fire	2–2	Philadelphia Union	Bridgeview, Illinois
5:00 p.m. EDT	Magee 16'; Duka (yellow card) 64'; Anangonó 86'; Soumaré (yellow card) 88'		Edu 32' (yellow card) 86'; Fernandes 39'; Bone (yellow card) 86'	Stadium: Toyota Park; Attendance: 12,699; Referee: Chris Penso

April 12, 2014 Regular Season	Philadelphia Union	2–2	Real Salt Lake	Chester, Pennsylvania
4:00 p.m. EDT	Wenger 55'; Edu 90'		Mullholland 6'; Beckerman 85'	Stadium: PPL Park; Attendance: 18,015; Referee: Alan Kelly

April 16, 2014 Regular Season	New York Red Bulls	2–1	Philadelphia Union	Harrison, New Jersey
7:30 p.m. EDT	Henry 57' (yellow card) 89'; Sam 67'; Sekagya (red card) 78'; Olave (yellow card) 82'		Fabinho (yellow card) 17'; Le Toux 80'	Stadium: Red Bull Arena; Referee: Ricardo Salazar

April 19, 2014 Regular Season	Philadelphia Union	0–0	Houston Dynamo	Chester, Pennsylvania
4:00 p.m. EDT	Williams (yellow card) 61'		Sarkodie (yellow card) 40' (yellow-red card) 82'; Clark (yellow card) 42'; Bruin (yellow card) 90+4'	Stadium: PPL Park; Attendance: 17,301

April 26, 2014 Regular Season	Montreal Impact	1–0	Philadelphia Union	Montreal, Quebec
4:00 p.m. EDT	Martins 14'; Ouimette (yellow card) 16'; Camara (yellow card) 37'; Brovsky (yellow card) 40'		Edu (yellow card) 2'; Gaddis (yellow card) 84'	Stadium: Stade Saputo; Attendance: 19,075; Referee: Baldomero Toledo

May 3, 2014 Regular Season	Seattle Sounders FC	2–1	Philadelphia Union	Seattle, Washington
10:00 p.m. EDT	Martins 61'; Marshall 84'; Dempsey (yellow card) 90+1'		Evans 13' (OG); Williams (yellow card) 31'; Edu (yellow card) 35'	Stadium: CenturyLink Field; Attendance: 38,516; Referee: Silviu Petrescu

May 10, 2014 Regular Season	Philadelphia Union	0–1	D.C. United	Chester, Pennsylvania
4:00 p.m. EDT			Rolfe 6'; Kitchen (yellow card) 33'; Korb (yellow card) 67'; Arnaud (yellow card) 78'	Stadium: PPL Park; Attendance: 18,522; Referee: Geoff Gamble

May 14, 2014 Regular Season	Sporting Kansas City	1–2	Philadelphia Union	Kansas City, Kansas
8:30 p.m. EDT	Dwyer 80'; Besler (yellow card) 86'		Cruz 49'; Fabinho (yellow card) 58'; Nogueira (yellow card) 70'; Maidana 81'; Bone (red card) 90'; MacMath (yellow card) 90+4'	Stadium: Sporting Park; Attendance: 19,073; Referee: Ricardo Salazar

May 17, 2014 Regular Season	Philadelphia Union	3–5	New England Revolution	Chester, Pennsylvania
7:00 p.m. EDT	Nogueira 36'; Berry (yellow card) 67'; Williams 76'; Okugo (yellow card) 78'; Maidana (red card) 82'; Le Toux 90+2'		Soares 13'; Fagundez 26'; Nguyen 49' (yellow card) 88'; Tierney 57'; Mullins 67'	Stadium: PPL Park; Attendance: 18,812; Referee: Ted Unkel

May 25, 2014 Regular Season	Los Angeles Galaxy	4–1	Philadelphia Union	Carson, California
8:00 p.m. EDT	Leonardo 2'; Juninho (yellow card) 31'; Donovan 49' 81'; Keane 64'		Edu 88' (P)	Stadium: Stub Hub Center; Attendance: 21,010; Referee: Jorge Gonzalez

May 31, 2014 Regular Season	Chivas USA	0–3	Philadelphia Union	Carson, California
10:30 p.m. EDT	Barrera (yellow card) 63'; Torres (yellow card) 64'; Avila (yellow card) 73'; Minda (red card) 83'		Casey 28' (P) 66'; Maidana 76'; Fabinho (yellow card) 65'	Stadium: Stub Hub Center; Attendance: 5,231

June 7, 2014 Regular Season	Philadelphia Union	3–3	Vancouver Whitecaps FC	Chester, Pennsylvania
7:00 p.m. EDT	Gaddis (yellow card) 53'; Casey 63' 71'; Le Toux 68'; MacMath (yellow card) 80'; Lahoud (yellow card) 90+4'		Hurtado 18'; Mezquida 41'; Morales 81' (p) (yellow card) 90+4'; Leveron (yellow card) 90+2'	Stadium: PPL Park; Attendance: 18,843; Referee: Jose Carlos Rivero

June 28, 2014 Regular Season	New England Revolution	1–3	Philadelphia Union	Foxborough, Massachusetts
7:30 p.m. EDT	Sène 73' (yellow card) 74'; Dorman (yellow card) 85'; Gonçalves (yellow card) 90+1'	report	Le Toux 42', 78'; Cruz 69'; Wenger (yellow card) 80'	Stadium: Gillette Stadium; Attendance: 16,483; Referee: Alan Kelly

July 4, 2014 Regular Season	FC Dallas	2–1	Philadelphia Union	Frisco, Texas
9:00 p.m. EDT	Akindele 26'; Williams 49'		Okugo 43'; Casey (yellow card) 65'; Le Toux (yellow card) 68'; Edu (red card) 89'	Stadium: Toyota Stadium; Attendance: 18,679

July 12, 2014 Regular Season	Philadelphia Union	3–3	Colorado Rapids	Chester, Pennsylvania
7:00 p.m. EDT	Casey 16'; Lahoud (yellow card) 29' (red card) 76'; Williams 31'; Wenger 74'; Okugo (red card) 90'		O'Niell (yellow card) 12'; Serna 18'; LaBrocca (yellow card) 34'; Powers 79' (P); Brown 86'	Stadium: PPL Park; Attendance: 18,679

July 16, 2014 Regular Season	Philadelphia Union	3–1	New York Red Bulls	Chester, Pennsylvania
7:00 p.m. EDT	Casey 9'; Fred 51'; Le Toux 69' (P)		Wright-Phillips 60'; Miazga (yellow card) 86'	Stadium: PPL Park; Attendance: 18,541

July 19, 2014 Regular Season	Chicago Fire	1–1	Philadelphia Union	Bridgeview, Illinois
8:30 p.m. EDT	Alex (yellow card) 26'; Larentowicz 60'	Summary	Okugo (yellow card) 22'; Le Toux 90+1' (pen.)	Stadium: Toyota Park; Attendance: 17,460; Referee: (Canada) Geoff Gamble

August 1, 2014 Regular Season	Sporting Kansas City	1–1	Philadelphia Union	Kansas City, Kansas
8:00 p.m. EDT	Zusi 54'	Summary	Brown 71'	Stadium: Sporting Park; Attendance: 21,318; Referee: (United States) Jair Marrufo

August 9, 2014 Regular Season	Philadelphia Union	2–1	Montreal Impact	Chester, Pennsylvania
7:00 p.m. EDT	Le Toux 12' 63'	Summary	Tissot 79'	Stadium: PPL Park; Attendance: 18,703; Referee: (United States) Fotis Bazakos

August 15, 2014 Regular Season	Houston Dynamo	2–0	Philadelphia Union	Houston, Texas
9:00 p.m. EDT	Horst (yellow card) 28'; Bruin 51'; Beasley (yellow card) 58'; Gaddis 90'	Summary	Cruz (yellow card) 45'	Stadium: BBVA Compass Stadium; Attendance: 20,283; Referee: Baldomero Toledo

August 24, 2014 Regular Season	Philadelphia Union	4–2	San Jose Earthquakes	Chester, Pennsylvania
8:00 p.m. EDT	Wenger 10', 79'; Le Toux 14' (yellow card) 68'; Williams 72'	Summary	Cronin 59'; Wondolowski 70'	Stadium: PPL Park; Attendance: 17,421; Referee: Ted Unkel

September 3, 2014 Regular Season	Philadelphia Union	1–0	Toronto FC	Chester, Pennsylvania
7:00 p.m. EDT	Edu (yellow card) 33'; Casey 55'	Summary	Morgan (red card) 77'; Bradley (yellow card) 84'; Henry (yellow card) 90+3'	Stadium: PPL Park; Attendance: 15,238; Referee: Jose Carlos Rivero

September 6, 2014 Regular Season	Toronto FC	0–2	Philadelphia Union	Toronto, Ontario
7:00 p.m. EDT	Casey 8'; Wenger 44'	Summary	Henry (yellow card) 28'	Stadium: BMO Field; Attendance: 22,591; Referee: Alan Kelly

September 13, 2014 Regular Season	Philadelphia Union	2–2	New York Red Bulls	Chester, Pennsylvania
3:00 p.m. EDT	Cruz (yellow card) 30'; Ribeiro 41'; Le Toux 90+2' (pen.)	Summary	Luyindula 37' (pen.); Henry 40'; Cahill (yellow card) 62'; Robles (yellow card) 69'; Izquierdo (yellow card) 81'	Stadium: PPL Park; Attendance: 18,091; Referee: Allen Chapman

September 20, 2014 Regular Season	Philadelphia Union	0–0	Houston Dynamo	Chester, Pennsylvania
7:00 p.m. EDT		Summary	Sarkodie (yellow card) 75'	Stadium: PPL Park; Attendance: 18,462; Referee: Geoff Gamble

September 27, 2014 Regular Season	D.C. United	1–0	Philadelphia Union	Washington, D.C.
3:00 p.m. EDT	Silva 10'; Kitchen (yellow card) 86'	Summary	Edu (yellow card) 90'	Stadium: RFK Stadium; Attendance: 19,478; Referee: Silviu Petrescu

October 2, 2014 Regular Season	Philadelphia Union	1–1	Chicago Fire	Chester, Pennsylvania
8:00 p.m. EDT	Okugo 88'	Summary	Palmer (yellow card) 5'; Nyarko (yellow card) 86'; Larentowicz (yellow card) 90+1'; Earnshaw 90+2'	Stadium: PPL Park; Attendance: 14,838; Referee: Chris Penso

October 11, 2014 Regular Season	Philadelphia Union	2–3	Columbus Crew	Chester, Pennsylvania
7:00 p.m. EDT	Cruz 68' (yellow card) 70'; Wenger 75'	Summary	Finlay 78'; Meram 79'; Arrieta 83'; Barson (yellow card) 90+1'	Stadium: PPL Park; Attendance: 15,849; Referee: (United States) Mark Geiger

October 18, 2014 Regular Season	Philadelphia Union	2–1	Sporting Kansas City	Chester, Pennsylvania
7:00 p.m. EDT	Brown 45'; Ribeiro 71'; Valdés (yellow card) 90'	Report	Collin (yellow card) 26'; Dwyer 54' (pen.); Olum (yellow card) 84'	Stadium: PPL Park; Attendance: 18,073; Referee: Jair Marrufo

October 26, 2014 Regular Season	Columbus Crew	2–1	Philadelphia Union	Columbus, Ohio
5:00 p.m. EDT	Arieta 13'; Anor 90'	Report	Pfeffer 85'	Stadium: Crew Stadium; Attendance: 16,892; Referee: Ismail Elfath

=== U.S. Open Cup ===
June 17 Fourth round	Philadelphia Union	3–1 (a.e.t.)	Harrisburg City Islanders	Chester, Pennsylvania
19:00 ET	Gaddis (yellow card) 79'; Edu 89', (yellow card) 108'; Wenger 110', 117'; Hoppenot (yellow card) 112'	Report; Box Score	Langley (yellow card) 32'; Pelletier 38'; Júnior (yellow card) 94'	Stadium: PPL Park

June 24 Fifth round	Philadelphia Union	2–1 (a.e.t.)	New York Cosmos	Chester, Pennsylvania
19:00 ET	Carroll (yellow card) 21'; Cruz (yellow card) 29'; Le Toux 57', 113' (pen.); Fabinho (yellow card) 67'; Lahoud (red card) 118'	report	Noselli 56', (yellow card) 111'; Ockford (red card) 105'; Maurer (yellow card) 113'; Ayoze (red card) 118'	Stadium: PPL Park

July 8 Quarterfinals	Philadelphia Union	2–0	New England Revolution	Chester, Pennsylvania
19:00 ET	Casey 9'; Le Toux 48'; Okugo (yellow card) 57'; Williams (yellow card) 75'; Wheeler (yellow card) 76'	Report; Box Score	McCarthy (yellow card) 16'; Soares (yellow card) 47' (yellow-red card) 90+4'; Gonçalves (yellow card) 71'; Nguyen (yellow card) 74'	Stadium: PPL Park; Attendance: 2,626; Referee: Fotis Bazakos

August 12 Semifinals	FC Dallas	1–1 (a.e.t.) (3–4 p)	Philadelphia Union	Frisco, Texas
21:00 ET	Castillo 81'	Report; Boxscore	Okugo 47'; White (yellow card) 75'; Lahoud (yellow card) 102'; Cruz (yellow card) 114'	Stadium: Toyota Stadium; Referee: Mark Geiger

September 16 Finals	Philadelphia Union	1–3 (a.e.t.)	Seattle Sounders FC	Chester, Pennsylvania
19:30 ET	Edu 38'; Casey (yellow card) 57'	Report	Alonso (yellow card) 25'; Barrett 47'; Dempsey 101'; Martins 114'	Stadium: PPL Park; Attendance: 15,256; Referee: Armando Villarreal

=== Friendlies ===
June 18, 2014 Friendly	Reading United	2–3	Philadelphia Union	West Lawn, Pennsylvania
7:00 p.m. EDT	Touloute 46'; Campbell 75'	Report	Wheeler 6'; Hardware 83' 84'	Stadium: Gurski Stadium

July 25, 2014 Friendly	Philadelphia Union	0–1	Crystal Palace	Chester, Pennsylvania
7:00 p.m. EDT	Brown (yellow card) 35'	Report	White 20' (o.g.)	Stadium: PPL Park; Attendance: 15,482

August 28, 2014 Friendly	Harrisburg City Islanders	2–3	Philadelphia Union	Harrisburg, Pennsylvania
7:00 p.m. EDT	Barril 22'; Baúque 55'	Report	Le Toux 13'; Fernandes 45'; Fred 75'	Stadium: Skyline Sports Complex; Attendance: 2,558

=== Results summary ===
Overall								Home						Away					
Pld	Pts	W	L	T	GF	GA	GD	W	L	T	GF	GA	GD	W	L	T	GF	GA	GD
34	42	10	12	12	51	51	0	6	3	8	30	26	+4	4	9	4	21	25	−4

Last updated: October 30, 2014
Pld = Matches played; Pts = Points; W = Matches won; T = Matches tied; L = Matches lost; GF = Goals for; GA = Goals against; GD = Goal difference

Round	1	2	3	4	5	6	7	8	9	10	11	12	13	14	15	16	17	18	19	20	21	22	23	24	25	26	27	28	29	30	31	32	33	34
Stadium	A	H	A	H	A	H	A	H	A	A	H	A	H	A	A	H	A	A	H	H	A	A	H	A	H	H	A	H	H	A	H	H	H	A
Result	T	W	L	T	T	T	L	T	L	L	L	W	L	L	W	T	W	L	T	W	T	T	W	L	W	W	W	T	T	L	T	L	W	L

Updated to match(es) played on October 29, 2014. Source: MLS Results and League table
A = Away; H = Home; W = Win; L = Loss; T = Tie

== Coaching staff ==
Position	Staff	Nation
Manager	Jim Curtin	United States
Assistant coach	Mike Sorber	United States
Technical director/Assistant Coach	Chris Albright	United States
Head Athletic Trainer	Paul Rushing	United States
Strength and conditioning Coach	Kevin Miller	United States
Team Coordinator	Josh Gros	United States
Academy director	Tommy Wilson	Scotland
Equipment Director	Ford Gaitley	United States

== Transfers ==
=== In ===
Date	Player	Number	Position	Previous club	Fee/notes
December 12, 2013	(United States) Corben Bone		MF	(United States) Chicago Fire	2013 MLS Re-Entry Draft
January 14, 2014	(United States) Ethan White		DF	(United States) D.C. United	Traded for Jeff Parke and a swap of allocation spots
January 15, 2014	(Argentina) Cristian Maidana		FW	(Chile) Rangers	Undisclosed
January 16, 2014	(Jamaica) Andre Blake		GK	(United States) Connecticut Huskies	2014 MLS SuperDraft
January 30, 2014	(France) Vincent Nogueira		MF	(France) Sochaux	Undisclosed
February 3, 2014	(United States) Brian Holt		GK	(United States) Harrisburg City Islanders	Free
February 24, 2014	(United States) Austin Berry		DF	(United States) Chicago Fire	Traded for allocation money
March 20, 2014	(Brazil) Fred		MF	(Australia) Melbourne Heart	Waiver Draft
April 4, 2014	(United States) Andrew Wenger		FW	(Canada) Montreal Impact	Traded for Jack McInerney
July 30, 2014	(Algeria) Rais M'Bolhi		GK	(Bulgaria) CSKA Sofia	Undisclosed
August 4, 2014	(Colombia) Carlos Valdés		DF	(Argentina) San Lorenzo	Loan Return

=== Out ===
Date	Player	Number	Position	New club	Fee/notes
November 25, 2013	(North Macedonia) Oka Nikolov		GK	(United States) Fort Lauderdale Strikers	Waived
November 25, 2013	(United States) Greg Jordan		MF	(United States) Minnesota United FC	Waived
November 25, 2013	(Brazil) Kléberson		MF	(United States) Indy Eleven	Waived
November 25, 2013	(United States) Don Anding		DF		Waived
November 25, 2013	(United States) Chris Albright		DF		Retired
December 23, 2013	(United States) Michael Farfan		MF	(Mexico) Cruz Azul	Undisclosed
January 14, 2014	(United States) Jeff Parke		DF	(United States) D.C. United	Traded for Ethan White and a swap of allocation spots
April 4, 2014	(United States) Jack McInerney		FW	(Canada) Montreal Impact	Traded for Andrew Wenger
April 8, 2014	(Trinidad and Tobago) Keon Daniel		MF	(Poland) Miedź Legnica	Contract Terminated
July 30, 2014	(United States) Brian Holt		GK		Waived

=== Loan in ===
Date	Player	Number	Position	Loaned from	Fee/notes
January 27, 2014	(United States) Maurice Edu		MF	(England) Stoke City	
July 12, 2014	(Jamaica) Brian Brown		FW	(Jamaica) Harbour View	

=== Loan out ===
Date	Player	Number	Position	Loaned to	Fee/notes
March 21, 2014	(Mexico) Cristhian Hernández		MF	(United States) Harrisburg City Islanders	
March 21, 2014	(United States) Jimmy McLaughlin		MF	(United States) Harrisburg City Islanders	
March 21, 2014	(United States) Richie Marquez		DF	(United States) Harrisburg City Islanders	
March 21, 2014	(Brazil) Pedro Ribeiro		MF	(United States) Harrisburg City Islanders	

== See also ==
- Philadelphia Union
- 2014 in American soccer
- 2014 Major League Soccer season
