= Justin Clark =

American soccer player

Personal information
- Full name: Justin Clark
- Date of birth: October 17, 1988 (age 38)
- Place of birth: Atlanta, Georgia, United States
- Height: 1.85 m (6 ft 1 in)
- Position: Defender

Youth career
- 2007–2011: Rollins Tars

Senior career*
Years	Team	Apps	(Gls)
2012–2014	Orlando City	23	(0)
- * Club domestic league appearances and goals as of September 18, 2014

Justin Clark (born October 17, 1988, Atlanta, Georgia) is an American soccer player who most recently played for Orlando City in USL Pro, the third tier of the American soccer pyramid.

== Career ==
=== College and Professional ===
Clark attended Marist School in Georgia, winning a state championship in 2006. He then attended and played three years of college soccer at Rollins College, playing in 41 games and scoring 3 goals and becoming an All-American his senior year.

Clark played with Orlando City during the 2012 preseason, and played in almost every preseason game for the Lions, scoring one goal. He signed his first professional contract with Orlando City on April 4, 2012. He was released upon the conclusion of the 2014 season, a casualty of the club's transition to Major League Soccer.
