= Diego de la Tejera =

Mexican footballer (born 1995)

Personal information
- Full name: Diego de la Tejera Farías
- Date of birth: 26 April 1995 (age 31)
- Place of birth: León, Guanajuato, Mexico
- Height: 1.77 m (5 ft 9 1/2 in)
- Position: Midfielder

Youth career
- 2010–2011: Unión de Curtidores
- 2012–2013: FC Dallas
- 2014–2017: Club León

Senior career*
Years	Team	Apps	(Gls)
2015–2017	Club León	1	(0)
2017–2018	→ Celaya(loan)	15	(1)
- * Club domestic league appearances and goals as of August 13, 2018

Diego de la Tejera Farías (born 26 April 1995) is a Mexican footballer who plays as a midfielder for Celaya of the Ascenso MX on loan from Club León.

== Career ==
De La Tejera early career started at FC Dallas where he played 3 years and then move to Leon where he made his debut in the Liga MX against Toluca FC and in Copa MX against Correcaminos playing some minutes and leaving some really good impressions. De la Tejera joined Celaya before the 2017 Apertura tournament and made his Ascenco MX debut in an away match against Querétaro.
