= 2014 Walt Disney World Pro Soccer Classic =

Tournament details
- Host country: United States
- Dates: February 19 – March 1
- Teams: 8
- Venue: 1 (in 1 host city)

Final positions
- Champions: Columbus Crew SC (1st title)
- Runners-up: Sporting Kansas City

Tournament statistics
- Matches played: 16
- Goals scored: 52 (3.25 per match)

The 2014 Walt Disney World Pro Soccer Classic was the fifth edition of the Walt Disney World Pro Soccer Classic, a pre-season exhibition tournament held at the ESPN Wide World of Sports Complex at the Walt Disney World Resort in Bay Lake, Florida. The 2014 edition was reportedly set to feature a field of eight teams including 5 MLS teams, two international teams, and USL Pro's Orlando City. (Note: See line 7 in the Page Source) However, the schedule was released with 6 MLS teams, one international team, and Orlando City.

The defending champions were the Montreal Impact.

The 2014 tournament was won by last year's runners-up, the Columbus Crew SC, who defeated the reigning MLS Cup champions Sporting Kansas City 4–1 in the final.

== Teams ==
The following clubs have confirmed their entry into the tournament.

Team	Location	Professional League	Notes	Appearance	Ref.
Columbus Crew SC	Columbus, Ohio	Major League Soccer		2nd	
Fluminense FC U23	Rio de Janeiro, Brazil	Campeonato Brasileiro Série A		1st	
Montreal Impact	Montreal, Quebec	Major League Soccer	2013 WDW Pro Soccer Classic winners 2013 Canadian Championship winners	3rd	
New York Red Bulls	Harrison, New Jersey	Major League Soccer	2013 Supporters' Shield winners 2010 WDW Pro Soccer Classic winners	2nd	
Orlando City	Orlando, Florida	USL Pro	2013 USL Pro winners	4th	
Philadelphia Union	Chester, Pennsylvania	Major League Soccer		2nd	
Sporting Kansas City	Kansas City, Kansas	Major League Soccer	2013 MLS Cup winners	3rd	
Toronto FC	Toronto, Ontario	Major League Soccer	Last continuous participant	5th	

== Matches ==
The schedule was released on the official website on January 13, 2014.

Key to colors in group tables
Group winners advance to Final

=== Group stage ===
==== Group A ====
Team	Pld	W	L	D	GF	GA	GD	Pts
Columbus Crew SC	3	2	0	1	8	5	+3	7
Orlando City	3	0	0	3	6	6	0	3
Philadelphia Union	3	0	1	2	1	2	−1	2
Toronto FC	3	0	1	2	2	4	−2	2

February 19	Columbus Crew SC (United States)	3–1	(Canada) Toronto FC	Bay Lake, Florida
13:00	Higuaín 10'; Williams 12'; Bedell 61'	Report	Wahl 14' (o.g.)	Stadium: ESPN Wide World of Sports Complex

February 19	Orlando City (United States)	1–1	(United States) Philadelphia Union	Bay Lake, Florida
18:00	Hertzog 31'; Boden (yellow card) 53'	Report	Fernandes 72'	Stadium: ESPN Wide World of Sports Complex

February 22	Philadelphia Union (United States)	0–1	(United States) Columbus Crew SC	Bay Lake, Florida
13:00			Higuaín 87' (pen.)	Stadium: ESPN Wide World of Sports Complex

February 22	Toronto FC (Canada)	1–1	(United States) Orlando City	Bay Lake, Florida
18:00	Bekker 13' (pen.)	Report	Trialist #25 (yellow card) 13'; Howard 87'	Stadium: ESPN Wide World of Sports Complex

February 26	Philadelphia Union (United States)	0–0	(Canada) Toronto FC	Bay Lake, Florida
13:00				Stadium: ESPN Wide World of Sports Complex

February 26	Orlando City (United States)	4–4	(United States) Columbus Crew SC	Bay Lake, Florida
18:00	Cerén 30'; Molino 51'; Mbengue 83'; Chin 88'	Report	Finley 42'; Finlay 76', 88'; Meram 86'	Stadium: ESPN Wide World of Sports Complex

==== Group B ====
Team	Pld	W	L	D	GF	GA	GD	Pts
Sporting Kansas City	3	3	0	0	7	2	+5	9
New York Red Bulls	3	2	1	0	4	1	+3	6
Montreal Impact	3	1	2	0	3	6	−3	3
Fluminense FC U23	3	0	3	0	0	5	−5	0

February 19	New York Red Bulls (United States)	0–1	(United States) Sporting Kansas City	Bay Lake, Florida
15:00		Report	Peterson 65'	Stadium: ESPN Wide World of Sports Complex

February 19	Montreal Impact (Canada)	1–0	(Brazil) Fluminense FC U23	Bay Lake, Florida
20:00	Nyassi 18'	Report		Stadium: ESPN Wide World of Sports Complex

February 22	Fluminense FC U23 (Brazil)	0–3	(United States) Sporting Kansas City	Bay Lake, Florida
15:00		Report	Medranda (yellow card) 18' (goal) 55'; Nagamura 40', 58'	Stadium: ESPN Wide World of Sports Complex

February 22	Montreal Impact (Canada)	0–3	(United States) New York Red Bulls	Bay Lake, Florida
18:00			Miller 45'; Bover 68'; Wright-Phillips 69'	Stadium: ESPN Wide World of Sports Complex

February 26	Fluminense FC U23 (Brazil)	0–1	(United States) New York Red Bulls	Bay Lake, Florida
15:00			Bover 74'	Stadium: ESPN Wide World of Sports Complex

February 26	Sporting Kansas City (United States)	3–2	(Canada) Montreal Impact	Bay Lake, Florida
20:00	Dwyer 9' (pen.), 43' (yellow card) 58'; Myers (yellow card) 53'; Zizzo 75'	Report	Nyassi 1'; Felipe 30' (pen.); Bernardello (yellow card) 55'; Tissot (yellow card) 77'	Stadium: ESPN Wide World of Sports Complex

=== Championship round ===
March 1 7th place match	Toronto FC (Canada)	2–4	(Brazil) Fluminense FC U23	Bay Lake, Florida
13:00				Stadium: ESPN Wide World of Sports Complex

March 1 5th place match	Philadelphia Union (United States)	1–1 (4–1 p)	(Canada) Montreal Impact	Bay Lake, Florida
15:00	McInerney 29'	Report	Di Vaio 80'	Stadium: ESPN Wide World of Sports Complex
	Penalties
	Fernandes (penalty scored); Wheeler (penalty scored); Carroll (penalty scored); Nogueira (penalty scored)		(penalty missed) Di Vaio; (penalty missed) Bernier; (penalty scored) Bernardello

March 1 3rd place match	Orlando City (United States)	4–4	(United States) New York Red Bulls	Bay Lake, Florida
18:00	Hertzog 7'; Chin 47'; Álvarez (yellow card) 67'; Mbengue 76'; Molino 86'	Report	Wright-Phillips 29', 52'; Armando (yellow card) 42'; Sekagya 68'; Steele 80'	Stadium: ESPN Wide World of Sports Complex

March 1 Championship match	Columbus Crew SC (United States)	4–1	(United States) Sporting Kansas City	Bay Lake, Florida
20:00	Trapp (yellow card) 18'; Arrieta 20'; Parkhurst (yellow card) 45'; Anor 69'; Meram 74'; Higuaín 84'	Report	Zusi (yellow card) 56'; Bieler 87'	Stadium: ESPN Wide World of Sports Complex
