= Ian Christianson =

American professional soccer player

Personal information
- Date of birth: 6 March 1991 (age 35)
- Place of birth: Cedar Rapids, Iowa, United States
- Height: 5 ft 11 in (1.80 m)
- Position: Midfielder

Youth career
- 2001–2007: Cedar Rapids Soccer Association
- 2007–2009: Chicago Fire

College career
| Years | Team | Apps | (Gls) |
| 2009–2012 | Georgetown Hoyas | 78 | (14) |

Senior career*
| Years | Team | Apps | (Gls) |
| 2010–2011 | Chicago Fire Premier | 8 | (0) |
| 2012 | Reading United | 9 | (1) |
| 2013–2014 | New York Red Bulls | 3 | (0) |
| 2014 | → Orlando City (loan) | 3 | (0) |
| 2015 | Whitecaps FC 2 | 8 | (0) |
- * Club domestic league appearances and goals as of September 26, 2015

Ian Christianson (born March 6, 1991) is an American professional soccer player.

== Career ==
=== Early career ===
Christianson played four years of college soccer at Georgetown University between 2009 and 2012. With Georgetown he made 78 appearances in which he scored 14 goals and recorded 10 assists. While at college, Christianson appeared for USL PDL clubs Chicago Fire Premier and Reading United AC. On June 29, 2012, he scored his first goal for Reading United in a 4–0 victory over Bermuda Hogges.

=== Professional ===
On January 17, 2013, Christianson was selected 22nd in the 2013 MLS SuperDraft by New York Red Bulls. He missed the entire 2013 season due to an injury suffered during the preseason. Christianson was loaned to USL Pro club Orlando City SC on July 25, 2014. He made his first start for Orlando City on August 2, 2014, in a 4–1 victory over Charlotte Eagles. Christianson was recalled by New York and on September 20, 2014, made his league debut for Red Bulls in a 4–1 victory over Seattle Sounders FC.

Christianson was waived by the Red Bulls on February 17, 2015.

On March 27, 2015, Christianson signed with Whitecaps FC 2 of the United Soccer League.

== Career statistics ==
| Club | Season | League | | US Open Cup | | League Cup | | CONCACAF | | Total | |
| Club | Season | Apps | Goals | Apps | Goals | Apps | Goals | Apps | Goals | Apps | Goals |
|---|---|---|---|---|---|---|---|---|---|---|---|
| Chicago Fire Premier | 2010 | 3 | 0 | 0 | 0 | 0 | 0 | 0 | 0 | 3 | 0 |
| Chicago Fire Premier | 2011 | 5 | 0 | 1 | 0 | 0 | 0 | 0 | 0 | 6 | 0 |
| Chicago Fire Premier | Total | 8 | 0 | 1 | 0 | 0 | 0 | 0 | 0 | 9 | 0 |
| Reading United | 2012 | 9 | 1 | 0 | 0 | 0 | 0 | 0 | 0 | 9 | 1 |
| New York Red Bulls | 2013 | 0 | 0 | 0 | 0 | 0 | 0 | 0 | 0 | 0 | 0 |
| New York Red Bulls | 2014 | 3 | 0 | 0 | 0 | 0 | 0 | 3 | 0 | 6 | 0 |
| New York Red Bulls | 2015 | 0 | 0 | 0 | 0 | 0 | 0 | 0 | 0 | 0 | 0 |
| New York Red Bulls | Total | 3 | 0 | 0 | 0 | 0 | 0 | 3 | 0 | 6 | 0 |
| Orlando City (Loan) | 2014 | 3 | 0 | 0 | 0 | 0 | 0 | 0 | 0 | 3 | 0 |
| Career totals | | 23 | 1 | 1 | 0 | 0 | 0 | 3 | 0 | 27 | 1 |
