= Michael Bustamante =

Colombian footballer (born 1989)

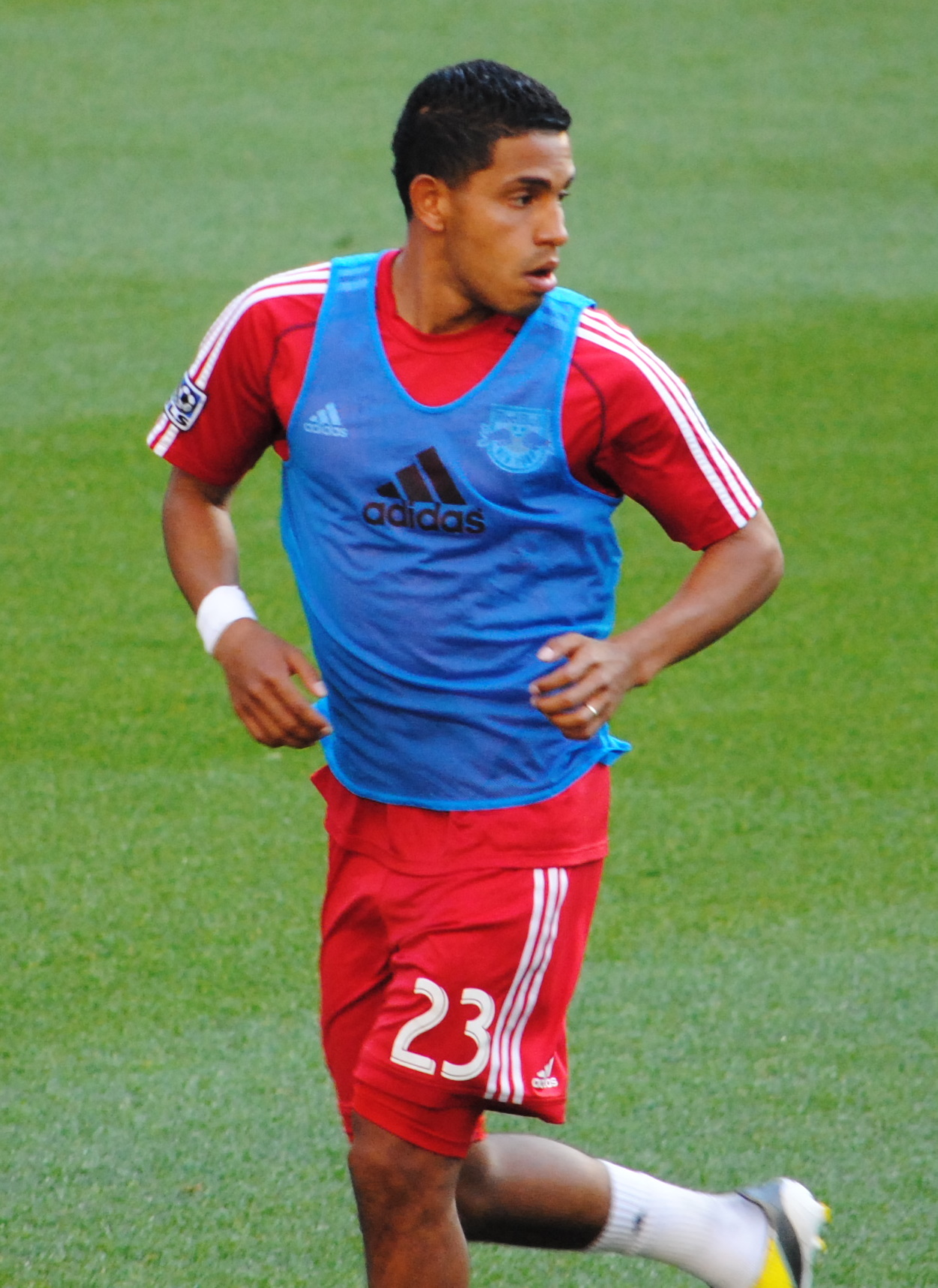

Personal information
- Full name: Michael Bustamante
- Date of birth: September 21, 1989 (age 37)
- Place of birth: Medellín, Colombia
- Height: 5 ft 9 in (1.75 m)
- Position: Midfielder

Youth career
- 2008–2012: Boston University Terriers

Senior career*
Years	Team	Apps	(Gls)
2012	Worcester Hydra	11	(3)
2013–2015	New York Red Bulls	4	(0)
2015	Charlotte Independence	2	(0)
2016–2019	Boston City FC		

Managerial career
- 2019: Boston City FC
- * Club domestic league appearances and goals as of August 19, 2015

Michael Bustamante (born September 21, 1989) is a Colombian retired footballer. He is also the former head coach of Boston City FC in the National Premier Soccer League.

== Career ==
=== Youth and college ===
Bustamante played college soccer at Boston University between 2008 and 2012. In four seasons with the Terriers, Bustamante appeared in 69 matches and scored 9 goals and recorded 27 assists. During his time at college, he also played for USL PDL club Worcester Hydra during their 2012 season.

=== Professional ===
Bustamante was drafted in the first round (13th overall) of the 2013 MLS Supplemental Draft by New York Red Bulls. He signed a developmental contract with the club on February 22, 2013. He then made his official debut for New York on May 29, 2013, starting in central midfield in a 2–0 US Open Cup victory over Reading United. He made his Major League Soccer debut as a late substitute during a 4–0 win against Montreal Impact on July 13, 2013.

Bustamante was waived by the Red Bulls on March 21, 2015. He signed with United Soccer League club Charlotte Independence on July 30, 2015.

Bustamante made his debut with Boston City FC on May 1, 2016, in a game against the New York Cosmos. He was named to the All-NPSL team in his first season. Bustamante was named head coach of Boston City FC on March 14, 2019. On May 26, 2019, in a game against the Greater Lowell Rough Diamonds, Bustamante received a red card in this 85th minute of the game and was suspended for six games plus an additional six months for the incident. He was released from the team on June 7, 2019.

== Honours ==
=== Club ===
New York Red Bulls

- MLS Supporters' Shield: 2013

Boston City FC

- All-NPSL Team: 2016

== Career statistics ==
All-time club performance
Club	Season	Major League Soccer		US Open Cup		MLS Cup		CONCACAF		Total	
Club	Season	App	Goals	App	Goals	App	Goals	App	Goals	App	Goals
New York Red Bulls	2013	4	0	1	0	-	-	-	-	5	0
New York Red Bulls	2014	-	-	1	0	-	-	-	-	1	0
New York Red Bulls	Club Total	4	0	2	0	-	-	-	-	6	0
