= Armando Lozano =

Spanish footballer

Armando
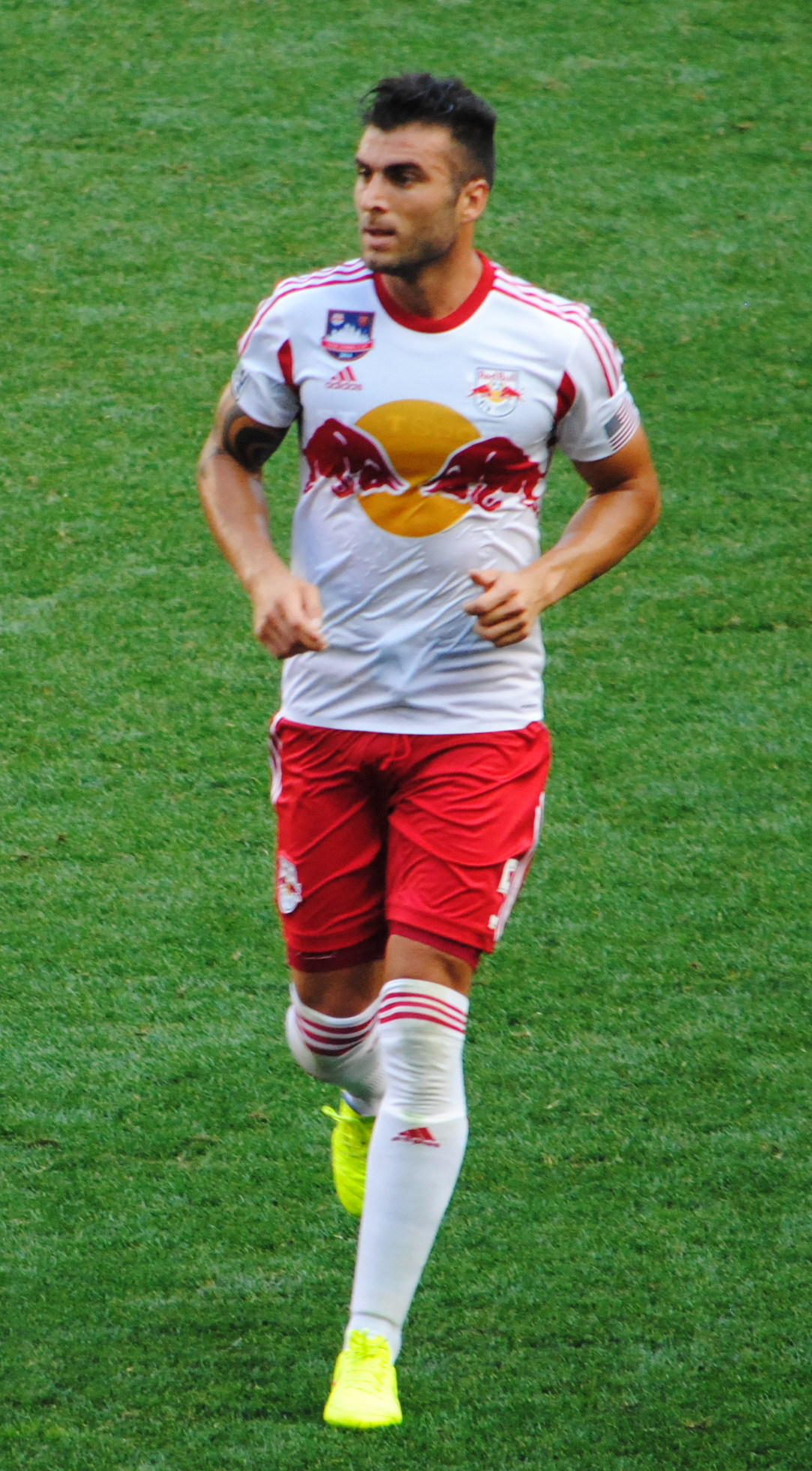
- Armando with the NY Red Bulls

Personal information
- Full name: Armando Lozano Sánchez
- Date of birth: 16 December 1984 (age 41)
- Place of birth: Motril, Spain
- Height: 1.86 m (6 ft 1 in)
- Position: Centre-back

Youth career
- Motril
- 2002–2003: Málaga

Senior career*
| Years | Team | Apps | (Gls) |
| 2002 | Motril | 7 | (0) |
| 2003–2006 | Málaga B | 62 | (0) |
| 2003–2004 | → Los Palacios (loan) | 15 | (0) |
| 2006–2007 | Málaga | 25 | (0) |
| 2007–2008 | Levante B | 12 | (0) |
| 2008 | Levante | 12 | (0) |
| 2008–2009 | Cartagena | 28 | (2) |
| 2009–2012 | Barcelona B | 51 | (2) |
| 2012 | Veracruz | 4 | (1) |
| 2013–2014 | Córdoba | 27 | (2) |
| 2014 | New York Red Bulls | 19 | (0) |
| 2015–2017 | Elche | 46 | (5) |
| 2017–2018 | Fuenlabrada | 23 | (0) |
| 2018–2019 | Salamanca | 29 | (0) |
| Total | | 360 | (12) |
- * Club domestic league appearances and goals

Armando Lozano Sánchez (born 16 December 1984), known simply as Armando, is a Spanish former professional footballer who played as a central defender.

A veteran of 192 Segunda División matches over nine seasons, he totalled eight goals for Málaga B, Málaga, Barcelona B, Córdoba and Elche. He also played in Mexico and the United States.

== Club career ==
Born in Motril, Province of Granada, Armando began playing football in his hometown with Motril. In 2002, he moved to Andalusia neighbours Málaga to finish his development, spending his first two professional seasons with its B side in the Segunda División.

Armando was definitely promoted to the first team in 2006–07, appearing regularly as they were also in the second division. For the following campaign he moved to La Liga with Levante, making his competition debut on 17 February 2008 in a 2–1 home win against Osasuna; in the middle of a serious financial crisis, the Valencian club would also be relegated.

After a spell with Cartagena, which he helped promote to division two, Armando stayed nonetheless in the Segunda División B, signing with Barcelona's reserves. He was only played regularly in the last season of his three-year spell, starting in all 23 of his appearances under the guidance of new manager Eusebio Sacristán.

On 18 December 2012, after an unassuming spell in Mexico with Veracruz, Armando returned to his country and joined Córdoba in the second division, penning a two-and-a-half-year contract. He made his official debut on 10 January of the following year, featuring the full 90 minutes of the 5–0 away loss to his former team Barcelona in the Copa del Rey, and appeared regularly during the second half of the league campaign, forming a solid partnership with Kiko.

On 23 January 2014, Armando signed with the New York Red Bulls from Major League Soccer. He appeared in 25 competitive matches in his only season, being waived in early March 2015.

On 8 August 2015, Armando agreed to a two-year deal at second-tier Elche. He scored his first goal for his new team on the 30th, helping to a 2–1 home win over Bilbao Athletic.

Armando retired in 2019 at age 34, following spells in the third division with Fuenlabrada and Salamanca UDS.

== Career statistics ==
As of 21 May 2016

Appearances and goals by club, season and competition
| Club | Season | League | | Cup | | Europe | | Other | | Total | |
| Club | Season | Apps | Goals | Apps | Goals | Apps | Goals | Apps | Goals | Apps | Goals |
|---|---|---|---|---|---|---|---|---|---|---|---|
| Motril | 2001–02 | 7 | 0 | — | | — | | — | | 7 | 0 |
| Málaga B | 2002–03 | 3 | 0 | — | | — | | — | | 3 | 0 |
| Los Palacios | 2003–04 | 15 | 0 | — | | — | | — | | 15 | 0 |
| Málaga B | 2004–05 | 23 | 0 | — | | — | | — | | 23 | 0 |
| Málaga B | 2005–06 | 36 | 0 | — | | — | | — | | 36 | 0 |
| Málaga B | Total | 62 | 0 | — | | — | | — | | 62 | 0 |
| Málaga | 2006–07 | 25 | 0 | 4 | 0 | — | | — | | 29 | 0 |
| Levante B | 2007–08 | 12 | 0 | — | | — | | — | | 12 | 0 |
| Levante | 2007–08 | 12 | 0 | 1 | 0 | — | | — | | 13 | 0 |
| Cartagena | 2008–09 | 28 | 2 | — | | — | | — | | 28 | 2 |
| Barcelona B | 2009–10 | 16 | 1 | — | | — | | — | | 16 | 1 |
| Barcelona B | 2010–11 | 12 | 0 | — | | — | | — | | 12 | 0 |
| Barcelona B | 2011–12 | 23 | 1 | — | | — | | — | | 23 | 1 |
| Barcelona B | Total | 51 | 1 | — | | — | | — | | 51 | 2 |
| Veracruz | 2012–13 | 4 | 1 | 4 | 0 | — | | — | | 8 | 1 |
| Córdoba | 2012–13 | 19 | 1 | 1 | 0 | — | | — | | 20 | 0 |
| Córdoba | 2013–14 | 8 | 1 | 0 | 0 | — | | — | | 8 | 1 |
| Córdoba | Total | 27 | 2 | 1 | 0 | — | | — | | 28 | 2 |
| New York Red Bulls | 2014 | 19 | 0 | 1 | 0 | 4 | 0 | 1 | 0 | 25 | 0 |
| Elche | 2015–16 | 31 | 4 | 1 | 0 | — | | — | | 32 | 4 |
| Career total | | 293 | 11 | 12 | 0 | 4 | 0 | 1 | 0 | 310 | 11 |
