= Bradley Wright-Phillips =

English footballer (born 1985)

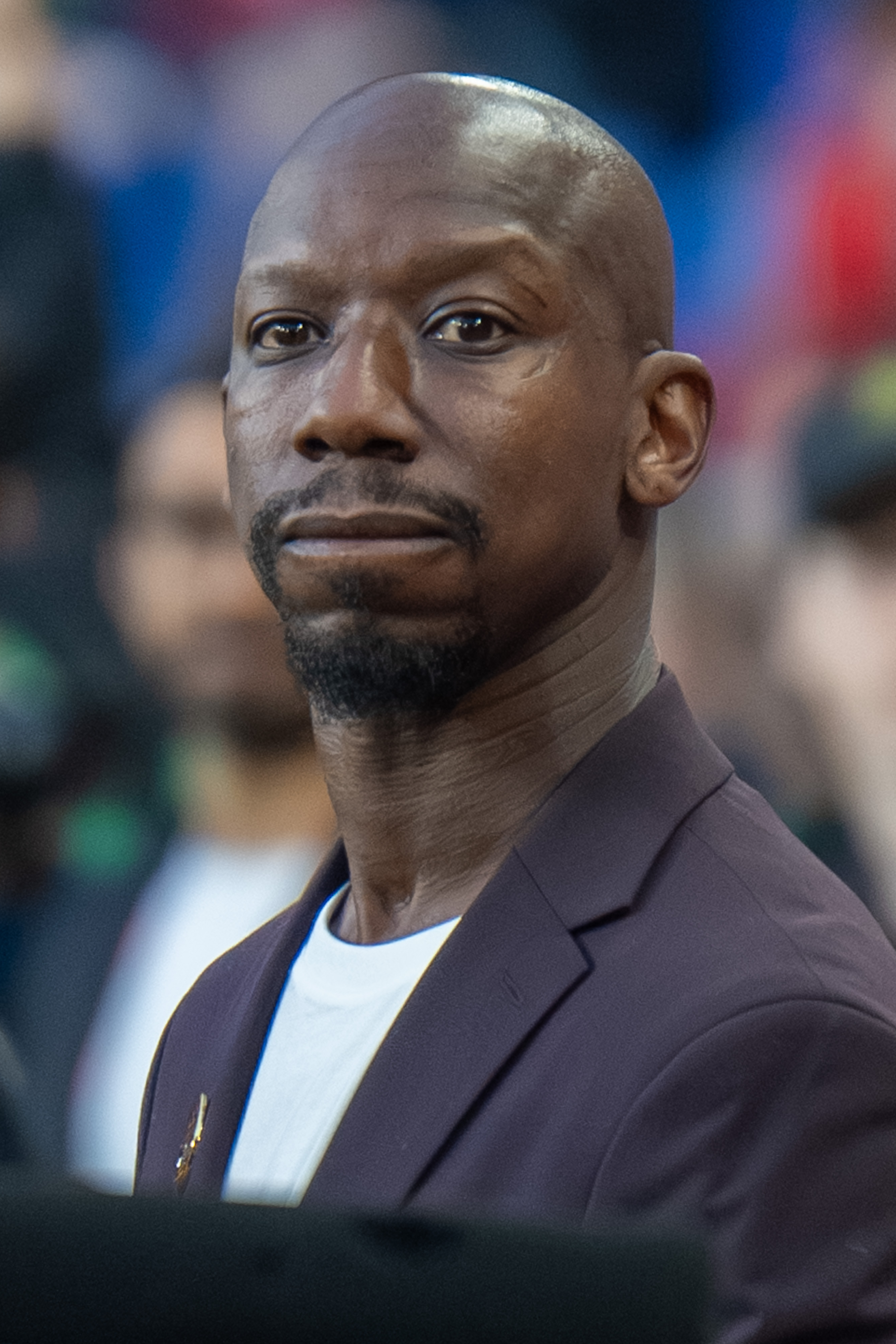
- Wright-Phillips in 2026

Personal information
- Full name: Bradley Edward Wright-Phillips
- Date of birth: 12 March 1985 (age 41)
- Place of birth: Lewisham, England
- Height: 5 ft 8 in (1.73 m)
- Position: Striker

Youth career
- 2001–2004: Manchester City

Senior career*
Years	Team	Apps	(Gls)
2004–2006	Manchester City	32	(2)
2006–2009	Southampton	111	(22)
2009–2011	Plymouth Argyle	32	(17)
2011–2013	Charlton Athletic	82	(31)
2013	→ Brentford (loan)	15	(5)
2013–2019	New York Red Bulls	195	(108)
2020	Los Angeles FC	19	(8)
2021	Columbus Crew	21	(1)
2022	New York Red Bulls	0	(0)
2025	Des Moines Menace	0	(0)
Total		507	(194)

International career
2005	England U20	5	(0)
- * Club domestic league appearances and goals

Bradley Edward Wright-Phillips (born 12 March 1985) is an English football pundit and former professional player who played as a striker. He is currently a studio host on MLS Season Pass.

Wright-Phillips is the son of Ian Wright and younger brother of Shaun Wright-Phillips.

He began his career with Manchester City in the Premier League, before spending the remainder of his time in England with Southampton, Plymouth Argyle, Charlton Athletic and Brentford. Wright-Phillips joined the New York Red Bulls halfway through the 2013 season, helping them to the Supporters' Shield, and in his first full season he equalled the league's record for most goals in a single campaign with 27. He is a two-time MLS Golden Boot winner and currently holds the New York Red Bulls record for most goals scored. In 2018, he became the eleventh MLS player to score 100 goals.

Internationally, Wright-Phillips earned five England U20 caps in 2005 and, after moving to North America, rejected the opportunity to represent Jamaica through his family background.

== Early life ==
Wright-Phillips is the son of former Arsenal and England player Ian Wright. His half-brother, Shaun Wright-Phillips, was his teammate at the New York Red Bulls for two seasons. He grew up in Brockley, South London and attended the state school Kelsey Park School in Beckenham and then moved to Haberdashers' Aske's Hatcham College nearby in New Cross Gate.

== Club career ==
=== Manchester City ===
Wright-Phillips was the top scorer for the Manchester City reserve team in the 2003–04 season. On 6 December 2004, he scored his first Premier League goal, four minutes after making his league debut as a substitute for Jon Macken against Middlesbrough. His only goal of the following season was the last in a 4–1 win over Birmingham City on 17 December 2005.

=== Southampton ===
After many frustrating appearances for Manchester City, with few goals, Wright-Phillips was sold to Championship team Southampton for £500,000 on 5 July 2006. Half of the transfer fee was funded by a prize from Coca-Cola won in a competition by a fan. He made an immediate impact at Southampton, scoring on his debut against Derby County at Pride Park, and scoring an impressive goal against Wolverhampton Wanderers in a 2–0 win at St. Mary's. He scored a total of 11 goals in the 2006–07 season. In 2007–08 he started the season with goals against Burnley and Queens Park Rangers. He made a total of 120 appearances for the club, scoring 24 goals.

=== Plymouth Argyle ===
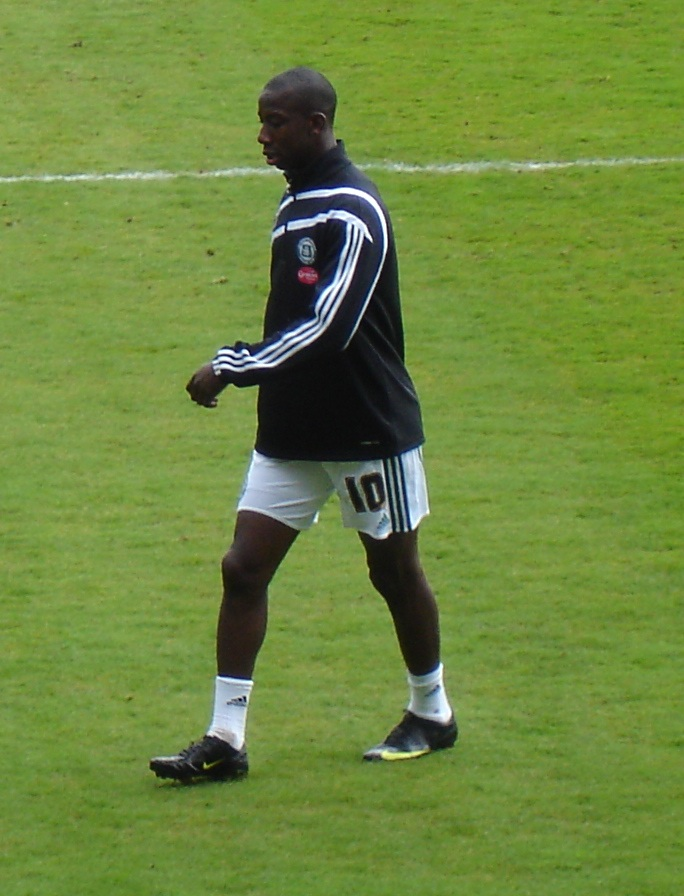
Wright-Phillips warming up for Plymouth Argyle in May 2010

At the end of the 2008–09 season, following Southampton's relegation to League One, Wright-Phillips was released from his contract at the club. On 15 July 2009, he signed a two-year deal with Plymouth Argyle of the Championship. After he recovered from a knee injury, Wright-Phillips made his debut for the club on 15 September 2009 against Watford. The knee injury occurred once again, and he was sidelined for another long-term spell. In January 2010, Wright-Phillips made his long-awaited return for Argyle in the FA Cup against Newcastle United. He made his first start for the club against Coventry City in March 2010, and scored his first goal for Plymouth against Bristol City on 16 March 2010. On 11 December 2010, Wright-Phillips scored both goals against Exeter City in the Devon derby in a 2–0 Plymouth win, the second marked his 12th of the season.

=== Charlton Athletic ===
On 24 January 2011, it was announced that Wright-Phillips was moving to fellow League One club Charlton Athletic for an undisclosed fee. He scored the only goal on his debut against Colchester United on 1 February 2011. On 28 February 2012, he scored a hat-trick in a 4–0 win at Chesterfield. Wright-Phillips contributed 22 goals in 42 matches as Charlton Athletic won the 2011–12 Football League One title. He was released by Charlton at the end of the 2012–13 season.

==== Loan to Brentford ====
On 19 February 2013, he joined Brentford on loan until the end of the season. In his half season at the club he appeared in 15 league matches scoring five goals.

=== New York Red Bulls ===
==== 2013 ====
On 24 July 2013, Wright-Phillips joined the New York Red Bulls. Despite joining the club in the latter part of the season Wright-Phillips was a contributor in helping New York capture its first major title, the MLS Supporters' Shield, playing seven regular season games and scoring once, the concluding goal in a 2–0 win against the Houston Dynamo at the BBVA Compass Stadium. On 6 November, he netted against the same opposition in the Eastern Conference semifinal, but his team were eliminated from the playoffs after extra time.

==== 2014 ====
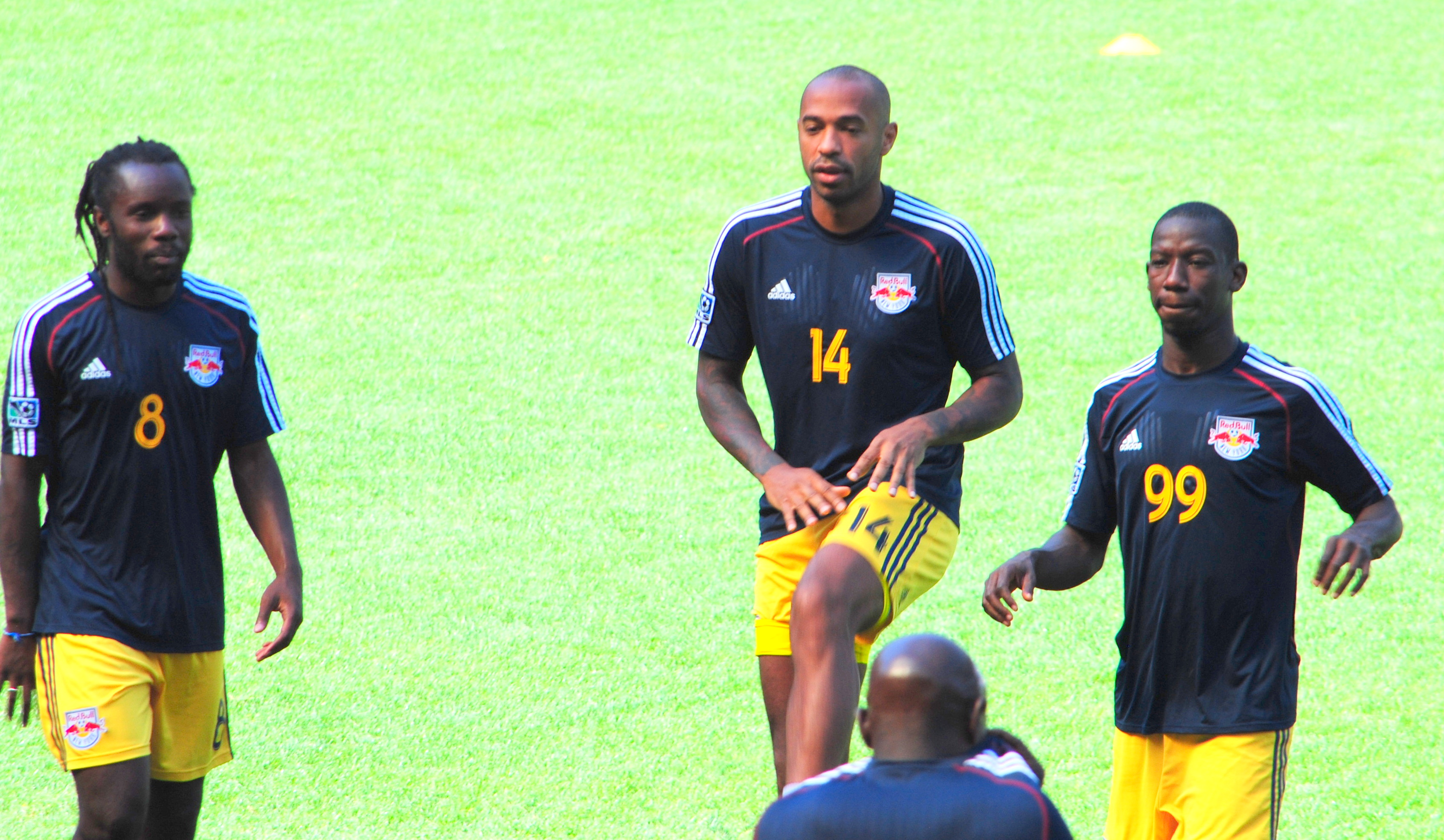
Wright-Phillips in training with Thierry Henry and Peguy Luyindula in August 2014

On 23 April 2014, Wright-Phillips scored a hat-trick in a 4–0 win against the Dynamo. He secured his second hat-trick for New York on 10 May during a 5–4 home loss to the Chicago Fire. Of note, he scored the winner in a friendly against his father's former team Arsenal, and the equaliser against Bayern Munich in the 2014 MLS All-Star Game. Two days after the All-Star game, Red Bulls Sporting Director Andy Roxburgh claimed that Wright-Phillips' scoring exploits were producing international transfer interest in the player. On 23 August 2014, he scored his 19th and 20th goals of the season in a 4–2 win against Montreal Impact to surpass Juan Pablo Ángel's club record for goals scored in a single season, and on 20 September he returned from a short-term injury to record his third hat trick of the 2014 MLS season in a 4–1 win over Seattle Sounders FC. On 26 October 2014 Wright-Phillips scored twice to equal the Major League Soccer season goal record of 27 goals as New York beat Sporting Kansas City 2–0 in the league's regular-season finale.

Wright-Phillips again scored twice for the Red Bulls in their first match of the 2014 MLS Cup Playoffs, once again against Kansas City in a 2–1 victory. He scored his third play-off goal against D.C. United in the first leg of the 2014 MLS Eastern Conference semi-final, helping New York to a 2–0 victory. The Red Bulls got to the Eastern Conference Final against the New England Revolution. In the first leg Wright-Phillips recklessly encroached upon Revolution goalkeeper Bobby Shuttleworth on a throw, earning his second yellow of the playoffs. He had to miss the second, do-or-die leg in Foxborough, where the Red Bulls' season ended with a 2–2 tie losing the series 3–2 on aggregate thus missing MLS Cup Final.

==== 2015 ====
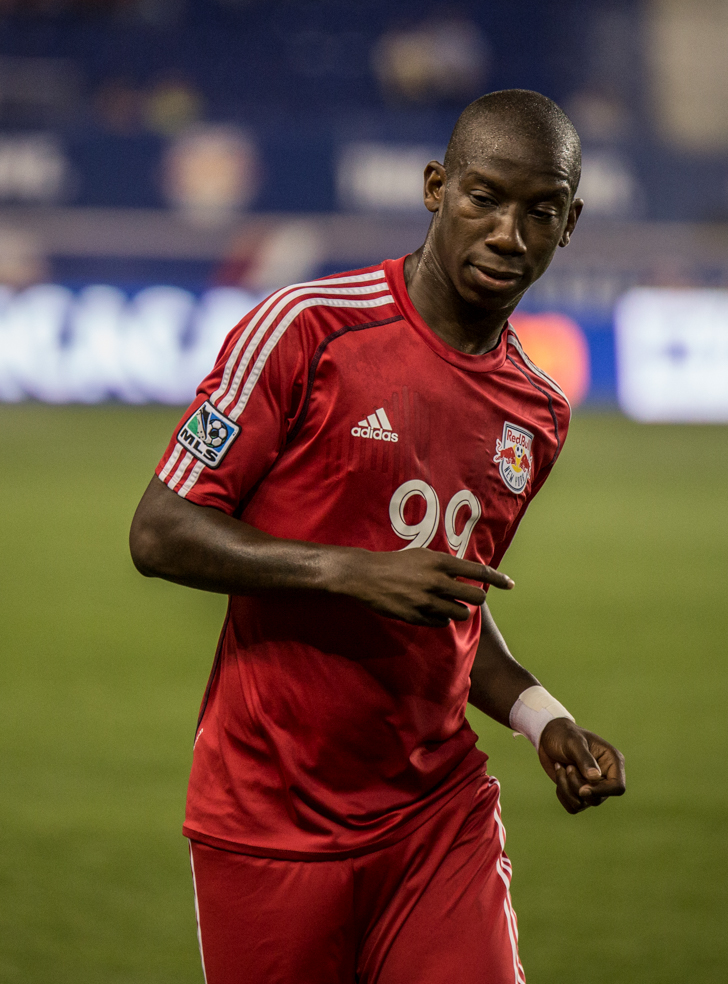
Bradley Wright-Phillips with New York Red Bulls in 2014

Following his 2014 success, New York signed Wright-Phillips to a designated player contract for 2015. On 22 March 2015 Wright-Phillips scored his first goal of the season and assisted Lloyd Sam on another in a 2–0 victory over rival D.C. United at Red Bull Arena earning him MLS Player of the Week honors. The following week Wright-Phillips was selected to the MLS Team of the Week for his performance in a 2–1 victory over Columbus Crew in which he scored his second goal of the season and assisted on Mike Grella's game-winning goal. On 10 May, he scored both goals as the Red Bulls won 2–1 at home against New York City FC in the first Hudson River derby between the two franchises, and equalised in a 3–1 victory at the rivals' Yankee Stadium on 28 June. On 11 July, he helped New York to a 4–1 victory over New England Revolution, scoring twice during the match.

On 1 August 2015, Wright-Phillips scored the opening goal in a 3–1 away victory over Philadelphia Union. He was assisted on the goal by his brother Shaun who was making his debut for New York. Eight days later he scored in his third New York derby of the season, opening a 2–0 home win. On 30 August, Wright-Phillips scored two goals in helping New York to a 3–0 victory over D.C. United. On 25 October Wright-Phillips scored the opening goal for New York in 2–1 victory over Chicago, helping Red Bulls clinch the 2015 MLS Supporters' Shield. In the second leg of the Conference semi-finals against D.C. United in the 2015 MLS Cup Playoffs, Wright-Phillips scored the only goal of the game in added time, and his team advanced 2–0 on aggregate.

==== 2016 ====
On 24 April 2016, Wright-Phillips scored his first two goals of the season in helping New York come from behind to win 3–2 over Orlando City SC. Wright-Phillips scored two goals and assisted on another in a 7–0 win over New York City FC at Yankee Stadium on 21 May.

In his 100th appearance with the club on 28 May, a 3–0 home win over Toronto FC, Wright-Phillips set an MLS record scoring a hat-trick in the first 27 minutes of the game; it was the fastest scored from the opening whistle in league history. A week later, he was named as the Etihad Player of the Month for May; recording six goals and two assists in May. With his 8th goal in 6 games against New York City FC, Wright-Phillips tied Juan Pablo Ángel for club's most goals all-time with 62. Wright-Phillips broke the all-time scoring record with his 63rd on 31 July against the Chicago Fire Two weeks later he scored two goals against the Montreal Impact in a 3–1 victory; breaking another team record with 59 league goals. After scoring the second goal in a 2–2 draw against D.C. United, Wright-Phillips broke an MLS record by scoring the most league goals over a three-year span with 62 spanning from the 2014–2016 seasons. A record previously held by Chris Wondolowski from 2010 to 2012. With his 20th league goal in 2016, Wright-Phillips became the first player in league history to record two 20-plus goal seasons. On 23 October, Wright-Phillips captured his second MLS Golden Boot title in three years, beating cross town rival, David Villa by one goal.

==== 2017 ====
On 22 February 2017, Wright-Phillips scored his first CONCACAF Champions League goal for the club in a 1–1 draw against Vancouver Whitecaps FC in the quarterfinals. On 29 March, Wright-Phillips signed a new multi-year designated player contract with the club. On 18 June, Wright-Phillips scored two late goals to lead New York to a 2–0 victory over Philadelphia Union. On 13 July, Wright-Phillips scored his first 2017 Lamar Hunt U.S. Open Cup goal; a late winner to lead New York to a 1–0 victory over New England Revolution, advancing to the semifinals of the cup. One month later on 15 August, Wright-Phillips scored a brace against FC Cincinnati, including a goal in the 101st minute to send New York to their first Open Cup final since 2003. With his 15th goal of the season on 9 September, Wright-Phillips joined Robbie Keane as the only two players in MLS history to score 15 or more goals in four consecutive seasons. On 5 November, Wright-Phillips scored his 100th career goal for the New York Red Bulls in a 1–0 victory over Toronto FC.

==== 2018 ====
On 1 March 2018, Wright-Phillips opened the scoring for New York in a 2–0 victory over Olimpia in the CONCACAF Champions League. With the victory New York advanced to the Champions League Quarterfinals for the second time in club history. On 6 March he scored two goals to lead New York to a 2–0 victory in Mexico over Club Tijuana in the CONCACAF Champions League. On 10 March 2018, he scored his first league goal in a 4–0 victory over Portland Timbers. On 13 March 2018, Wright-Phillips assisted on all of New York's goals in a 3–1 victory over Club Tijuana in the CONCACAF Champions League, helping the club advance to semifinals of the Champions League for the first time. On 5 May 2018, Wright-Phillips added to his tally of goals against New York City FC, scoring his club's second goal in a 4–0 victory. On 25 July 2018, Wright-Phillips scored his 100th MLS goal in a 1–0 victory over D.C. United, surpassing Taylor Twellman as the fastest player in MLS history to score 100 goals. On 5 August, New York Red Bulls retired his No 99 jersey and announced that they will never issue it to another player after he retires.

==== 2019 ====
Wright-Phillips made 29 appearances in all competitions during the 2019 season: 24 in Major League Soccer, four in the CONCACAF Champions League and one in the MLS Cup Playoffs.

He left the Red Bulls in November 2019 on the expiry of his contract, after six years with the club. Wright-Phillips, a two-time Golden Boot winner, scored 126 goals in 240 appearances for the Red Bulls. The club's sporting director, Denis Hamlett, described Wright-Phillips as "one of the best forwards in MLS history".

=== Los Angeles ===
On 14 February 2020, Los Angeles FC announced the signing of Wright-Phillips ahead of the 2020 season.

=== Columbus Crew ===
On 23 December 2020, it was announced that Wright-Phillips would join the Columbus Crew ahead of their 2021 season. Wright-Phillips made his debut for Columbus in the CONCACAF Champions League tie against Real Estelí. He scored his first goal for the team in the second leg of the tie in a 1–0 win for Columbus. He further made his league debut for Columbus in a 0–0 draw against the Philadelphia Union, coming on as a substitute for Gyasi Zardes. Following the 2021 season, Columbus opted to decline their contract option on Wright-Phillips.

=== Retirement ===
On 8 March 2022, Wright-Phillips announced his retirement from football. On 9 March 2022, Wright-Phillips announced that he signed a one-day contract to retire as a New York Red Bull, following which he was appointed "Special Assistant to the Sporting Director".

=== Des Moines Menace ===
On 19 March 2025, Wright-Phillips played 65 minutes for the Des Moines Menace in a 2–1 win against Sporting Kansas City II in the 2025 U.S. Open Cup. Wright-Phillips also appeared in the 2–1 loss to Union Omaha but was subbed off in the 15th minute after suffering an injury.

== International career ==
Wright-Phillips represented England at U20 level. He was first called up in February 2005 and he made his debut as a half time substitute in a 2–0 friendly victory against Russia. He was called up again that summer for the 2005 Toulon Tournament where he played Tunisia, South Korea and the third-place playoff penalty shootout victory over Mexico.

In addition to England, Wright-Phillips was eligible to represent Grenada, Jamaica and Trinidad and Tobago through his heritage. In 2015, Grenada and Jamaica both approached Wright-Phillips about a transfer of allegiances but the player chose to concentrate on his club football.

== Personal life ==
Wright-Phillips is married to Leann; the couple have three children.

Wright-Phillips holds an active interest in grime music and is affiliated with Lewisham-based grime crew OGz having appeared on pirate radio sets with the group. In 2014, he clashed fellow footballer Yannick Bolasie for the long running grime DVD series Lord of the Mics.

Wright-Phillips earned his U.S. green card following the 2016 MLS season.

== Career statistics ==
Appearances and goals by club, season and competition
Club	Season	League			National cup (Note: Includes FA Cup, U.S. Open Cup)		League cup (Note: Includes Football League Cup)		Continental		Other		Total	
Club	Season	Division	Apps	Goals	Apps	Goals	Apps	Goals	Apps	Goals	Apps	Goals	Apps	Goals
Manchester City	2004–05	Premier League	14	1	1	0	2	0	—		—		17	1
Manchester City	2005–06	Premier League	18	1	5	0	0	0	—		—		23	1
Manchester City	Total		32	2	6	0	2	0	—		—		40	2
Southampton	2006–07	Championship	39	8	2	0	3	3	—		—		44	11
Southampton	2007–08	Championship	39	8	3	0	1	0	—		—		43	8
Southampton	2008–09	Championship	33	6	0	0	1	0	—		—		34	6
Southampton	Total		111	22	5	0	5	3	—		—		121	25
Plymouth Argyle	2009–10	Championship	15	4	1	0	0	0	—		—		16	4
Plymouth Argyle	2010–11	League One	17	13	1	0	1	0	—		2 (Note: Appearances in Football League Trophy)	0	21	13
Plymouth Argyle	Total		32	17	2	0	1	0	—		2	0	37	17
Charlton Athletic	2010–11	League One	21	8	0	0	0	0	—		0	0	21	8
Charlton Athletic	2011–12	League One	42	22	3	0	0	0	—		0	0	45	22
Charlton Athletic	2012–13	Championship	19	1	1	0	1	0	—		—		21	1
Charlton Athletic	Total		82	31	4	0	1	0	—		0	0	87	31
Brentford (loan)	2012–13	League One	15	5	0	0	0	0	—		2	0	17	5
New York Red Bulls	2013	MLS	7	1	0	0	—		—		2 (Note: Appearances in MLS Cup playoffs)	1	9	2
New York Red Bulls	2014	MLS	32	27	1	0	—		—		4	4	37	31
New York Red Bulls	2015	MLS	34	17	2	0	—		—		4	1	40	18
New York Red Bulls	2016	MLS	34	24	2	0	—		2 (Note: Appearances in CONCACAF Champions League)	0	2	1	40	25
New York Red Bulls	2017	MLS	32	17	5	4	—		2	1	3	2	42	24
New York Red Bulls	2018	MLS	32	20	1	1	—		6	3	4	0	43	24
New York Red Bulls	2019	MLS	24	2	0	0	—		4	0	1	0	29	2
New York Red Bulls	Total		195	108	11	5	—		14	4	20	9	240	126
Los Angeles FC	2020	MLS	19 (Note: Includes three appearances and three goals in MLS is Back Tournament group stage)	8	—		—		0	0	2 (Note: Appearances in MLS is Back Tournament knockout stage)	1	21	9
Columbus Crew	2021	MLS	21	1	—		—		4	1	1 (Note: Appearance in Campeones Cup)	0	26	2
Career total			507	194	28	5	9	3	18	5	27	10	589	217

== Honours ==
Charlton Athletic

- Football League One: 2011–12

New York Red Bulls

- Supporters' Shield: 2013, 2015, 2018

Columbus Crew

- Campeones Cup: 2021

Individual

- PFA Team of the Year: 2010–11 League One
- MLS Golden Boot: 2014, 2016
- MLS Best XI: 2014, 2016
- MLS All-Star: 2014, 2018
- MLS 100 goals club
- Castrol Index Top MLS Player: 2014
- New York Red Bulls MVP: 2014, 2017, 2018
- CONCACAF Best XI: 2018
- MLS Comeback Player of the Year: 2020
