= Westervelt House (disambiguation) =

Westervelt House is a historic house in Tenafly, New Jersey.

Westervelt House may also refer to:

- Garritse–Doremus–Westervelt House, in Clifton, New Jersey
- Benjamin P. Westervelt House, in Cresskill, New Jersey
- Caspar Westervelt House, in Teaneck, New Jersey
- John Westervelt House, in Harrington Park, New Jersey
- Demott–Westervelt House, in Englewood, New Jersey
- Westervelt–Ackerson House, in Ramsey, New Jersey
- Westervelt–Cameron House, in Ridgewood, New Jersey
- Westervelt–Lydecker House, in Woodcliff Lake, New Jersey

== See also ==
- William Westerfeld House, in San Francisco, California
