= Clifton, New Jersey =

City in Passaic County, New Jersey, US

- City
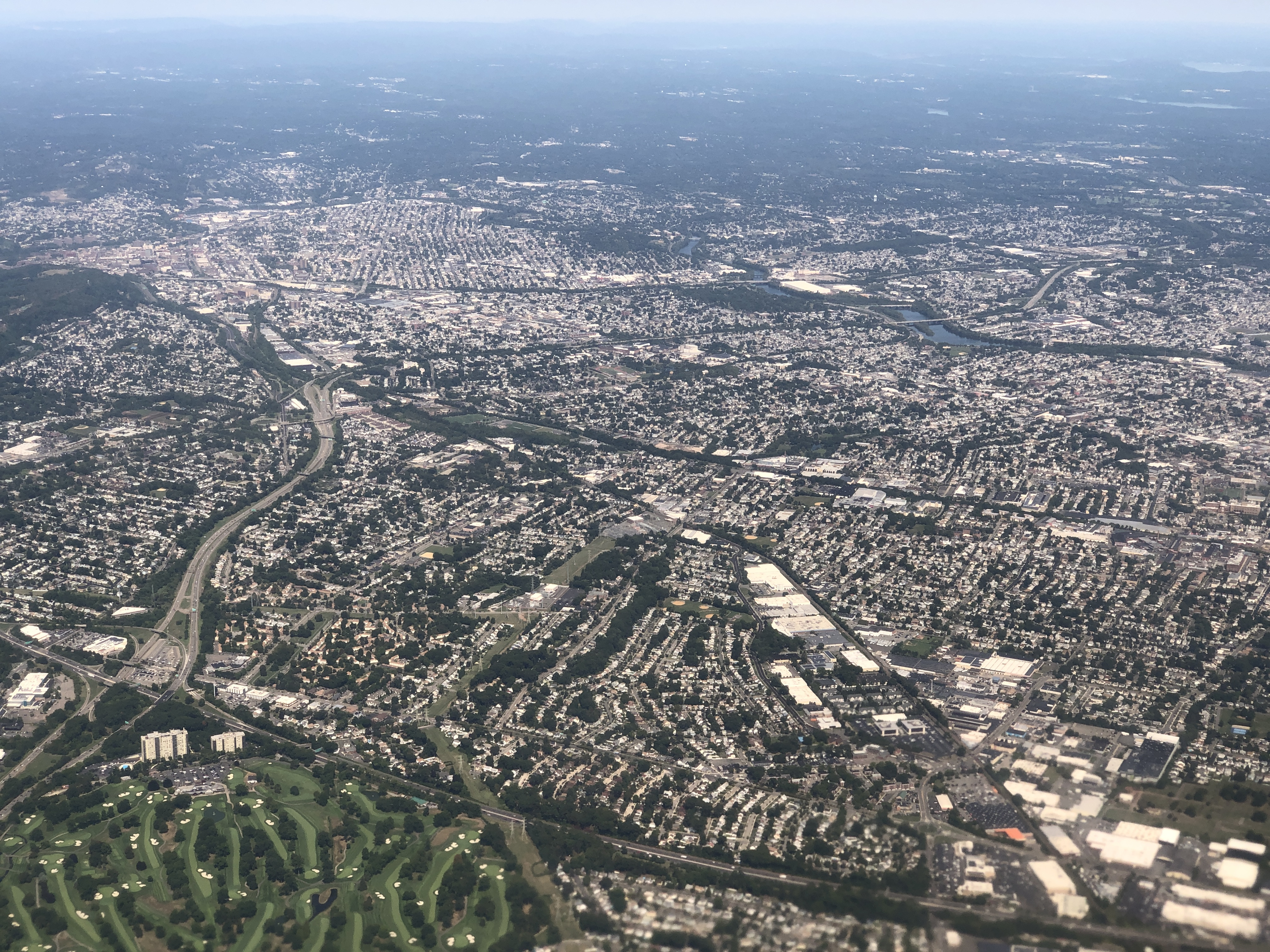
- Clifton viewed from above. The Garden State Parkway is visible on the left, with the Passaic River in the upper right and New Jersey Route 3 near the bottom

- Seal
- Nickname: "The City that Cares"
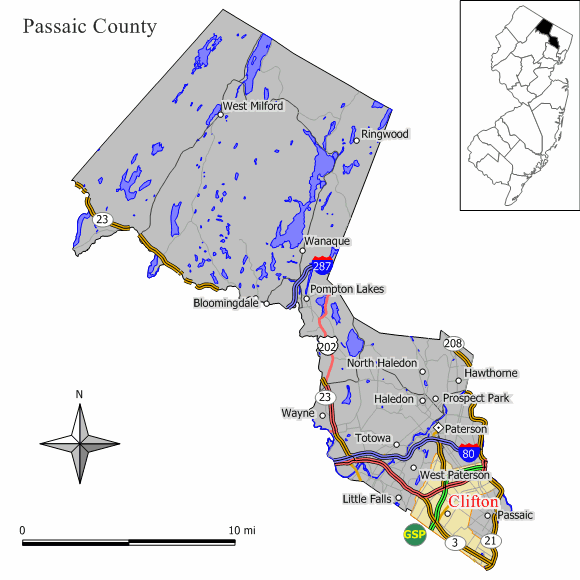
- Map of Clifton in Passaic County. Inset: location of Passaic County highlighted in the State of New Jersey.

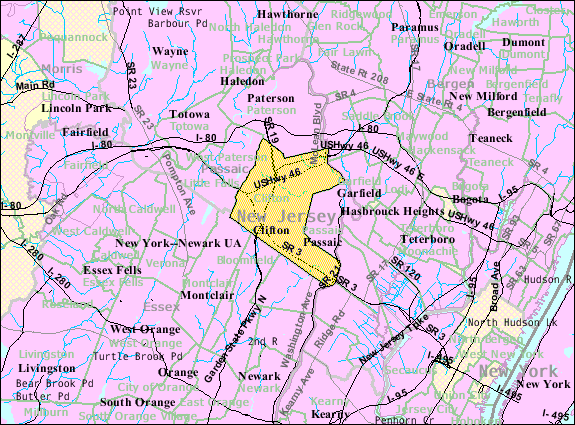
- Census Bureau map of Clifton, New Jersey
- Interactive map of Clifton, New Jersey
- Location in Passaic County Location in New Jersey Location in the United States
- Coordinates: 40.862137°N 74.160393°W
- Country: United States
- State: New Jersey
- County: Passaic
- Incorporated: April 26, 1917

Government
  - Type: 1923 Municipal Manager Law
  - Body: City Council
  - Mayor: Raymond Grabowski (term ends December 31, 2026)
  - Manager: Gary S. DeMarzo
  - Municipal clerk: Kathleen Tolosi

Area
  - Total: 11.43 sq mi (29.60 km^{2})
  - Land: 11.27 sq mi (29.20 km^{2})
  - Water: 0.15 sq mi (0.40 km^{2}) 1.37%
  - Rank: 197th of 565 in state 4th of 16 in county
- Elevation: 131 ft (40 m)

Population (2020)
  - Total: 90,296
  - Estimate (2023): 88,461
  - Rank: 394th in country (as of 2021); 11th of 565 in state 2nd of 16 in county
  - Density: 8,008.5/sq mi (3,092.1/km^{2})
  - Rank: 51st of 565 in state 4th of 16 in county
- Time zone: UTC−05:00 (Eastern (EST))
  - Summer (DST): UTC−04:00 (Eastern (EDT))
- ZIP Codes: 07011–07015
- Area code: 973
- FIPS code: 3403113690
- GNIS feature ID: 0885188
- Website: www.cliftonnj.org

Clifton is a city in Passaic County, in the U.S. state of New Jersey. Criss-crossed by several major highways, the city is a regional commercial hub for North Jersey, and bedroom suburb of New York City, in the New York Metropolitan Area. As of the 2020 United States Census, the city retained its position as the state's 11th-most-populous municipality, just behind tenth-ranked Trenton, and well ahead of Cherry Hill in twelfth place, with a population of 90,296, reflecting an overall increase of 6,160 (+7.3%) from the 2010 census count of 84,136, which in turn reflected an overall increase of 5,464 (+6.9%) from the 78,672 counted in the 2000 census. The Population Estimates Program calculated a population of 88,461 for 2023, making Clifton the 394th-most populous municipality in the nation.

Clifton was incorporated as a city by an act of the New Jersey Legislature on April 26, 1917, replacing Acquackanonk Township, based on the results of a referendum held two days earlier. Clifton is listed under five different ZIP codes. 07011, 07012, 07013, 07014, and 07015. Clifton has been named as one of the best cities to live in the United States.

== History ==
The City of Clifton turned 100 years old in April 2017, but documented European settlements in the area date back to 1679, when a leader of the Lenape Native Americans gave a deed for 11,000 acres (4,500 ha) along the shores of the Passaic River to Hans Frederick. The name "Clifton" was derived from the cliffs of Garrett Mountain, which borders the Albion Place neighborhood in the western part of the city. Clifton was once an agricultural hub, and home to the U.S. Animal Quarantine Station, which was operated in Clifton by the United States Department of Agriculture, starting in 1903. It was served by the Newark Branch of the Erie–Lackawanna Railroad. It was the primary location on the East Coast where animals like poultry, horses, cattle, and zoo animals, were held in quarantine after being brought into the United States, to ensure that the animals were not infected with diseases that could be spread in the U.S. The federal station operated in Clifton until the late 1970s, when the facility was relocated to Stewart International Airport. From 1900 to 1979, the Clifton Animal Quarantine Station inspected more than 95% of cloven-hooved animals entering the United States from abroad and was the only facility of its kind on the East Coast. Animals quarantined there included antelopes, giraffes, camels, sheep, and musk oxen. After the station closed, two of its former barns were converted into the Clifton Arts Center and are listed on the National Register of Historic Places.

Although Clifton has long converted from farmlands to suburban neighborhoods, given its close proximity to Manhattan, the city still has three small working farms that sell fresh and organic vegetables in-season:

- Ploch's Farm is a family-run 15-acre (6.1 ha) farm since 1867. The farm is still in operation as Clifton's last remaining farm. Ploch's Farm is open seasonally selling fruits and vegetables during the months of August and September.
- City Green Farm Eco Center is an organic farm and 501(c)3 non-profit focused on promoting urban farming and education since 2011. The 5-acre (2.0 ha) property, which was the site of the Schultheis Farm, was acquired by the city in 2005 for permanent preservation as open space.
- Richfield Farms is a family-run 5-acre (2.0 ha) farm and garden center since 1917, which had escaped redevelopment efforts in 2018.

== Geography ==
According to the United States Census Bureau, the city had a total area of 11.43 square miles (29.60 km^{2}), including 11.27 square miles (29.19 km^{2}) of land and 0.16 square miles (0.41 km^{2}) of water (1.37%).

The Passaic River provides part of the boundary of Clifton at its northeastern edge. Weasel Brook is a tributary of the Passaic, which links from Plog Brook, passing through its namesake Weasel Brook Park, before turning south and joining the Passaic River close to Route 21.

Unincorporated communities, localities, and place names, located partially or completely within the city, include:

- Albion Place – mostly residential, and adjacent to Garret Mountain Reservation in the northwestern corner of the city;
- Allwood – the other main "business district" in the city, along its main highway, State Route 3;
- Athenia – one of the more centrally located neighborhoods in the city, as well as home to one of the city's two train stations, and adjacent to the 3rd Ward Park neighborhood in Passaic;
- Botany Village – the northernmost neighborhood in the city, historically containing European ethnic groups, but mostly populated by Hispanic/Latino immigrants in recent years;
- Delawanna – home to one of the two train stations locally, in the southeastern corner of the city, and adjacent to Nutley/the 3rd Ward Park neighborhood in Passaic;
- Dutch Hill – mostly residential, and largely situated near downtown and one of the two local train stations;
- Lakeview – shares its name with the adjacent neighborhood in Paterson, along the western edge of the city, and mostly populated by Arabic and Hispanic/Latino residents;
- Main Mall – largely considered the main "downtown" section of the city;
- Montclair Heights – one of the wealthiest neighborhoods locally, adjacent to both Montclair State University, as well as Upper Montclair, in the southwestern corner of the city;
- Richfield – another of the more centrally located neighborhoods in the city, along with Athenia;
- Rosemawr – largely residential and wealthier, falling partially within Allwood, and home to an Orthodox Jewish community associated with a neighboring one in the city of Passaic, with which it shares the Passaic/Clifton Eruv
- Styertowne – home to the main namesake shopping plaza in the city;
- Yanticaw Pond – adjacent to the neighboring municipalities of Bloomfield, Nutley, and Montclair

Clifton is located off both Route 3 and Route 46, and is situated 15 miles (24 km) west of Midtown Manhattan, which is accessible via the Lincoln Tunnel. The city is also served by the Garden State Parkway, Route 19, and Route 21; all of those highways pass either around, or through, parts of the city.

The city borders the municipalities of Little Falls, Passaic, Paterson, and Woodland Park in Passaic County; Elmwood Park, Garfield, Lyndhurst, and Rutherford in Bergen County, and Bloomfield, Montclair, and Nutley in Essex County.

== Demographics ==
Historical population
Census	Pop.	Note	%±
1910	11,869		—
1920	26,470		123.0%
1930	46,875		77.1%
1940	48,827		4.2%
1950	64,511		32.1%
1960	82,084		27.2%
1970	82,437		0.4%
1980	74,388		−9.8%
1990	71,742		−3.6%
2000	78,672		9.7%
2010	84,136		6.9%
2020	90,296		7.3%
2023 (est.)	88,461		−2.0%
Population sources: 1910–1920 1910–1930; 1940–2000 2000; 2010 2020

=== Racial and ethnic composition ===
Clifton, New Jersey – Racial and ethnic composition Note: the US Census treats Hispanic/Latino as an ethnic category. This table excludes Latinos from the racial categories and assigns them to a separate category. Hispanics/Latinos may be of any race.
Race / Ethnicity (NH = Non-Hispanic)	Pop 1990	Pop 2000	Pop 2010	Pop 2020	% 1990	% 2000	% 2010	% 2020
White alone (NH)	63,396	53,206	44,870	39,250	88.37%	67.63%	53.33%	43.47%
Black or African American alone (NH)	861	2,002	3,235	3,899	1.20%	2.54%	3.84%	4.32%
Native American or Alaska Native alone (NH)	61	64	105	89	0.09%	0.08%	0.12%	0.10%
Asian alone (NH)	2,439	5,028	7,401	8,414	3.40%	6.39%	8.80%	9.32%
Pacific Islander alone (NH)	N/A	9	11	14	N/A	0.01%	0.01%	0.02%
Other race alone (NH)	108	226	318	607	0.15%	0.29%	0.38%	0.67%
Mixed race or Multiracial (NH)	N/A	2,529	1,342	1,864	N/A	3.21%	1.60%	2.06%
Hispanic or Latino (any race)	4,877	15,608	26,854	36,159	6.80%	19.84%	31.92%	40.04%
Total	71,742	78,672	84,136	90,296	100.00%	100.00%	100.00%	100.00%

=== 2020 census ===
As of the 2020 census, Clifton had a population of 90,296. The median age was 39.5 years. 20.8% of residents were under the age of 18 and 16.2% of residents were 65 years of age or older. For every 100 females there were 92.0 males, and for every 100 females age 18 and over there were 89.2 males age 18 and over.

100.0% of residents lived in urban areas, while 0.0% lived in rural areas.

There were 31,968 households in Clifton, of which 32.2% had children under the age of 18 living in them. Of all households, 48.7% were married-couple households, 16.9% were households with a male householder and no spouse or partner present, and 28.6% were households with a female householder and no spouse or partner present. About 24.8% of all households were made up of individuals and 11.4% had someone living alone who was 65 years of age or older.

There were 33,325 housing units, of which 4.1% were vacant. The homeowner vacancy rate was 0.9% and the rental vacancy rate was 4.1%.

Racial composition as of the 2020 census
Race	Number	Percent
White	44,107	48.8%
Black or African American	4,660	5.2%
American Indian and Alaska Native	826	0.9%
Asian	8,602	9.5%
Native Hawaiian and Other Pacific Islander	34	0.0%
Some other race	19,947	22.1%
Two or more races	12,120	13.4%
Hispanic or Latino (of any race)	36,159	40.0%

=== 2010 census ===
The 2010 United States census counted 84,136 people, 30,661 households, and 21,125 families in the city. The population density was 7,472.0 per square mile (2,885.0/km^{2}). There were 31,946 housing units at an average density of 2,837.1 per square mile (1,095.4/km^{2}). The racial makeup was 69.63% (58,588) White, 4.92% (4,137) Black or African American, 0.50% (419) Native American, 8.90% (7,488) Asian, 0.03% (22) Pacific Islander, 12.44% (10,464) from other races, and 3.59% (3,018) from two or more races. Hispanic or Latino of any race were 31.92% (26,854) of the population.

Of the 30,661 households, 30.3% had children under the age of 18; 50.3% were married couples living together; 13.0% had a female householder with no husband present and 31.1% were non-families. Of all households, 26.0% were made up of individuals and 11.3% had someone living alone who was 65 years of age or older. The average household size was 2.74 and the average family size was 3.33.

22.0% of the population were under the age of 18, 8.8% from 18 to 24, 28.3% from 25 to 44, 27.0% from 45 to 64, and 13.9% who were 65 years of age or older. The median age was 38.4 years. For every 100 females, the population had 93.2 males. For every 100 females ages 18 and older there were 90.4 males.

The Census Bureau's 2006–2010 American Community Survey showed that (in 2010 inflation-adjusted dollars) median household income was $62,271 (with a margin of error of +/− $3,208) and the median family income was $76,070 (+/− $2,883). Males had a median income of $49,780 (+/− $2,391) versus $40,149 (+/− $2,057) for females. The per capita income for the city was $29,812 (+/− $1,255). About 7.2% of families and 9.3% of the population were below the poverty line, including 15.5% of those under age 18 and 9.3% of those age 65 or over.

Same-sex couples headed 243 households in 2010.

=== 2000 census ===
As of the 2000 United States census there were 78,672 people, 30,244 households, and 20,354 families residing in the city. The population density was 6,965.2 inhabitants per square mile (2,689.3/km^{2}). There were 31,060 housing units at an average density of 2,749.9 per square mile (1,061.7/km^{2}). The racial makeup of the city was 66.22% White, 2.89% African American, 0.24% Native American, 6.44% Asian, 0.03% Pacific Islander, 9.60% from other races, and 4.57% from two or more races. Hispanic or Latino people of any race were 19.84% of the population.

There were 30,244 households, out of which 28.9% had children under the age of 18 living with them, 51.3% were married couples living together, 11.5% had a female householder with no husband present, and 32.7% were non-families. 27.9% of all households were made up of individuals, and 13.7% had someone living alone who was 65 years of age or older. The average household size was 2.59 and the average family size was 3.20.

In the city the population was 21.6% under the age of 18, 7.7% from 18 to 24, 30.7% from 25 to 44, 22.5% from 45 to 64, and 17.6% who were 65 years of age or older. The median age was 39 years. For every 100 females, there were 91.4 males. For every 100 females age 18 and over, there were 88.1 males.

The median income for a household in the city was $50,619, and the median income for a family was $60,688. Males had a median income of $40,143 versus $32,090 for females. The per capita income for the city was $23,638. About 4.3% of families and 6.3% of the population were below the poverty line, including 8.6% of those under age 18 and 5.2% of those age 65 or over.

The most common ancestry groups in Clifton as of 2000 were Italian American (17%), Polish American (13%), Irish American (9%) and German American (8%). Many Turkish, Albanian, and Ukrainian immigrants also live in Clifton. There are significant populations of Puerto Ricans, Dominicans, Arabs, Filipinos, Chinese, and Indians as well.

== Economy ==
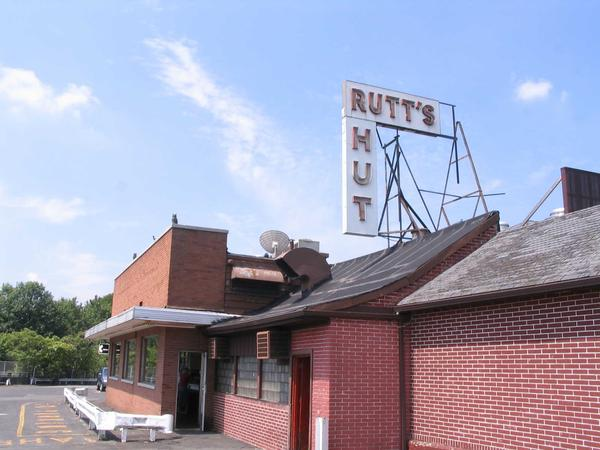
Rutt's Hut, in Clifton, was opened in 1928.

Clifton is a diverse suburb of New York City, just over 10 miles to the West of the city. It boasts numerous national and local shopping options and countless specialty grocers and retailers. Notable local businesses in Clifton include:

- Rutt's Hut, a hot dog restaurant, is located at the east end of Delawana Avenue. Established in 1928, it was described by Peter Applebome of The New York Times as being "on the long shortlist of the state's esteemed hot dog palaces".
- Clifton Commons, a shopping center located near Route 3, features numerous stores, restaurants and a 16-screen AMC movie theater, with a gross leasable area of 448,848 square feet (41,699.3 m^{2}).
- Promenade Shops at Clifton is an upscale mall located on Route 3 West.
- Many low-rise office buildings, containing professional tenants such as law and accounting firms and medical practices, are found on the stretch of Clifton Avenue between City Hall (at Van Houten) and Allwood Road.
- The now defunct Linens 'n Things, a bedding and home furnishings retailer, was headquartered in Clifton before its 2009 bankruptcy.

== Parks and recreation ==
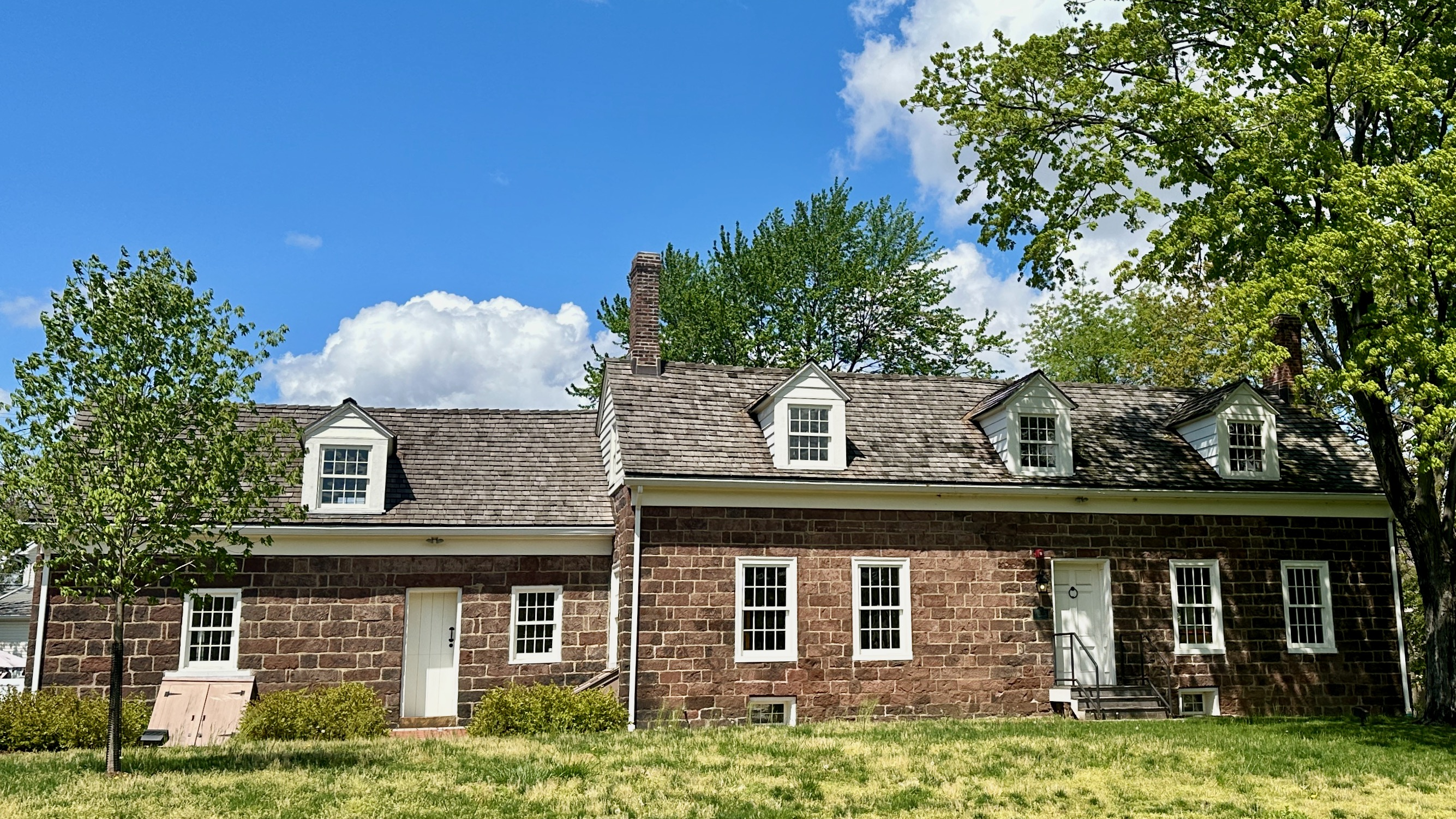
The Vanderhoef–Westervelt House in Weasel Brook Park

- Weasel Brook Park, a 19 acres (7.7 ha) county park located along the Weasel Brook, was designed by Olmsted Brothers landscaping firm. It features the Vanderhoef–Westervelt House, listed on the National Register of Historic Places.
- Morris Canal Park and Jack W. Kuepfer Sr. Nature Preserve, features a small water-filled portion of the historic Morris Canal.

== Government ==
=== Local government ===
The city of Clifton is governed under the 1923 Municipal Manager Law. The city is one of seven municipalities (of the 564) statewide governed under this form. The governing body is the City Council, which is comprised of seven council members, with all positions elected at-large on a non-partisan basis to concurrent four-terms of office as part of the November general election. The mayor is chosen by the City Council, with the position traditionally given to the top vote getter in the previous election. Clifton's municipal elections had been held in May, as required for municipalities conducting non-partisan elections. Following the passage of a state law in 2010 allowing non-partisan elections to be shifted to November, Clifton voters were overwhelmingly in favor of the move in a non-binding referendum held in November 2013. On December 13, 2013, the Clifton City Council voted 6–0, with one abstention, to make the move to November local elections binding, which had the effect of extending the terms of all sitting council members by six months, from June 30 to December 31. Officials cited increased voter participation and reduced costs as the justifications behind supporting the shift.

Under the council-manager system of government adopted in 1934, the council appoints a manager to oversee the day-to-day operation of the city. After each election, the seven elected council members choose one of their members to serve as mayor; by tradition, the person selected as mayor has been the person who received the most votes. In 2022, a citizen initiative was started to enact a referendum that would stagger the voting for the seven council members and have the mayor be directly elected by the voters.

As of 2026, Clifton's mayor is Raymond Grabowski, whose term of office ends December 31, 2026. He replaced James Anzaldi, who had been one of the members of the City Council since 1978, and was first selected to be mayor in 1990, succeeding two-term mayor Gloria Kolodziej. Anzaldi was the first mayor in Clifton's history to be elected to six terms. The other members of the City Council are Chris D'Amato (elected to serve an unexpired term), Joseph Kolodziej, Antonio Latona, Rosemary Pino and Mary Sadrakula, all of whom are serving concurrent terms of office that end on December 31, 2026.

In February 2024, the council appointed Chris D'Amato, who had come in eighth in the 2022 voting, to fill the seat that became vacant following the death of Lauren Murphy. D'Amato served on an interim basis until the 2024 general election, when he was elected to serve the remainder of the term of office.

A seat on the council became vacant as of May 14, 2026, following the death of Councilman Bill Gibson. In a June vote, the council split 3-3 on a replacement, leaving the seat vacant.

Grabowski's election and Council nomination as mayor ended up being considered the most contentious local political event since 1966, when the then-top vote getter, Bill Bate, the only Democrat on the Council at that time, ended up getting passed over in favor of Joseph Vanecek, as, this time around, Grabowski would only get four of the seven possible votes on the Council, as opposed to Anzaldi, who won most, if not all, of those votes unanimously, in each of his terms, with the other three votes going to newcomer Antonio Latona (Grabowski/Kolodziej/Murphy/Sadrakula voting for Grabowski; Gibson/Latona/Pino, surprisingly, voting for Latona, all despite Gibson reportedly privately considering taking enough of those votes away from Grabowski to become mayor himself as of January 2023, even though Grabowski won at the polls in November 2022 by the final margin of roughly 9,400–8,200).

=== Vacancies ===
If at any time a seat becomes vacant on the council, it is filled by special election unless the vacancy occurs during a council election year. If the vacancy comes before a council election year, the council must decide whether or not to appoint someone to serve as an interim councilperson within thirty days of the creation of the vacancy; if they choose to appoint someone, that person serves until the special election can be held and is eligible to run for the remainder of the term if he/she so desires. By tradition, the appointee will usually be the first runner up in the previous council election.

Since 1990, there have been six vacancies created on the Clifton city council. These are noted below:

- In 1992, Councilman George Bayeux died in office. His seat was left vacant and in the special election held in November 1992, Richard Stockinger was elected to take his place.
- In March 1996, a vacancy was created when Stockinger, who had been elected to a full term when the council stood for election in 1994, died from lung cancer. His seat remained vacant, and the special election to fill his seat was held in November 1996 and won by Edward Welsh.
- After the newly elected council had been sworn in in 2006, Antonio Latona was forced to vacate his seat as it was determined that, as a city employee (at the time, Latona was a working member of the city fire department), serving on the council would be a conflict of interest. Matt Ward, who had finished eighth in the election, was appointed to fill the vacancy in November of that year. The city held a special election in November 2007 to fill the remainder of the term; Ward defeated three other candidates to serve the remaining months, and, as mentioned, Latona, himself, would get elected without said conflict of interest in 2022.
- In February 2015, just after he was sworn into office for his second term, Councilman Matt Grabowski died from cancer. The council appointed Joseph Cupoli, the highest vote-getter among the previous losing candidates, to fill the seat until the November election. Raymond Grabowski, the councilman's brother, won the special election to serve out the remainder of the term.
- On January 13, 2024, Councilwoman Lauren Murphy died after a battle with pancreatic cancer. The council chose Chris D'Amato, who finished eighth in the previous council election, to fill the vacancy on February 3; D'Amato won the special election to fill the remainder of the term in November 2024.
- On May 14, 2026, Councilman Bill Gibson died after a long illness. As of May 30, 2026, the council had not decided whether to appoint a replacement for his seat, or to leave the seat vacant until November 2026, when the entire council will be up for election. On June 3, however, the council voted to potentially advance, either, Fahim Abedrabbo, former member of the Board of Education, who finished in ninth place in 2022, as well as the wife of Bill Gibson, Robin, who, despite her own family's public opposition to her serving the remaining months of her husband's term in office, nonetheless stated she would serve those few months if nominated by the rest of the council; both of those votes ended up tied at three council members apiece, though, meaning, under local law, neither candidate advanced to fill the vacancy.

=== Federal, state and county representation ===
Clifton is located in the 9th Congressional District, and is part of New Jersey's 27th state legislative district.

For the 119th United States Congress, New Jersey's 9th congressional district is represented by Nellie Pou (D, North Haledon) New Jersey is represented in the United States Senate by Democrats Cory Booker (Newark, term ends 2027) and Andy Kim (Moorestown, term ends 2031).

For the 2026–2027 session, the 27th legislative district of the New Jersey Legislature is represented in the State Senate by John F. McKeon (D, West Orange) and in the General Assembly by Rosy Bagolie (D, Livingston) and Alixon Collazos-Gill (D, Montclair).

As of the state legislative elections in November 2023, Clifton will be part of the 27th Legislative District, with both Clifton and Montclair leaving the 34th, and joining Livingston, Millburn, Roseland, and West Orange in Essex County, in that Legislative District; that reapportionment decision represented compromise between state legislators in both parties - the initial Democratic plan would have kept the existing 34th District entirely intact, while the initial Republican plan would have added it to the 40th Legislative District, placing it with some of the longtime Republican-leaning municipalities in that district.

Passaic County is governed by a Board of County Commissioners, comprised of seven members who are elected at-large to staggered three-year terms office on a partisan basis, with two or three seats coming up for election each year as part of the November general election in a three-year cycle. At a reorganization meeting held in January, the board selects a Director and Deputy Director from among its members to serve for a one-year term. As of 2026, Passaic County's Commissioners are: Director Cassandra "Sandi" Lazzara (D), Little Falls, term as commissioner ends December 31, 2027; term as director ends 2026), Deputy Director Orlando Cruz (D, Paterson, term as commissioner and as deputy director ends 2026), Rodney DeVore (D, Paterson, 2027), Bruce James (D, Clifton, 2026) Michael Ramaglia (D, West Milford, 2028), Christina Schratz (D, Passaic, 2028) and Nick Veliky (D, Clifton, appointed to a term ending in 2027).

Constitutional officers, elected on a countywide basis, are County Clerk Danielle Ireland-Imhof (D, Hawthorne, 2028), Sheriff Thomas Adamo (D, Wayne, 2027) and Surrogate Zoila S. Cassanova (D, Wayne, 2026).

=== Politics ===
As of January 2021, there were a total of 53,555 registered voters in Clifton, of which 22,940 (42.8% vs. 31.0% countywide) were registered Democrats, 9,562 (18% vs. 18.7%) were registered Republicans, and 20,150 (37.5% vs. 50.3%) were registered Unaffiliated. There were 19 voters registered to 3rd parties. Among the city's 2020 Census population, 52.9% (vs. 53.2% in Passaic County) were registered to vote, including 67.9% of those ages 18 and over (vs. 70.8% countywide).

Gubernatorial election results for Clifton
Year	Republican		Democratic		Third party(ies)	
Year	No.	%	No.	%	No.	%
2025	10,125	38.01%	16,272	61.09%	239	0.90%
2021	8,485	44.83%	10,240	54.11%	200	1.06%
2017	5,655	36.64%	9,465	61.32%	315	2.04%
2013	9,300	56.02%	7,100	42.77%	200	1.20%
2009	8,220	44.84%	9,080	49.54%	1,030	5.62%
2005	7,038	40.02%	9,925	56.43%	625	3.55%

In the 2024 presidential election, Republican Donald Trump received 48.1% of the vote (17,776 cast), ahead of the then-Vice President, Democrat Kamala Harris, with 47.2% of the vote (17,415 cast), and all 3rd party candidates with 3.7% of the vote (1,630 cast). In the 2020 presidential election, Democrat Joe Biden received 59% of the vote (23,930 cast), ahead of the then-President, Republican Donald Trump, with 39.7% of the vote (16,128 cast), and all 3rd party candidates with 1.3% of the vote (565 cast), among the 40,623 ballots cast by the city's 57,785 registered voters (70.3%). In the 2016 presidential election, Democrat Hillary Clinton received 60% of the vote (20,425 votes cast), ahead of Republican Donald Trump with 37% (12,620 votes cast), and all 3rd party candidates with their combined 3% (973 votes).

Presidential elections results
Year	Republican	Democratic	Third Parties
2024	48.1% 17,776	47.2% 17,415	3.7% 1,630
2020	39.7%' 16,128	59.0% 23,930	1.3% 565
2016	37.0% 12,620	60.0% 20,425	3.0% 973
2012	36.3% 10,885	62.6% 18,671	1.0% 305
2008	39.8% 12,848	56.5% 18,260	1.0% 134
2004	43.8% 13,120	52.0% 15,597	4.2% 228

In the 2021 gubernatorial election, the incumbent governor, Democrat Phil Murphy, received 10,240 votes cast (54%), ahead of Republican Jack Ciattarelli with 8,485 votes cast (45%), and all 3rd party candidates with 200 combined votes (1%), among the 18,925 ballots cast by the city's 53,555 registered voters (35.3%); despite Murphy winning by noticeably closer margins both locally and statewide compared to 2017, there were many more in-person votes cast once again, in contrast with 2020. In the 2017 gubernatorial election, Democrat Phil Murphy received 9,465 votes cast (61.3%), ahead of Republican Kim Guadagno with 5,655 votes cast (36.7%), and all 3rd party candidates with 315 combined votes (2%), among the 15,435 ballots cast by the city's 52,065 registered voters (30%). In the 2013 gubernatorial election, Republican Chris Christie received 56.0% of the vote (9,300 cast), ahead of Democrat Barbara Buono with 42.8% (7,100 votes), and 3rd party candidates with 1.2% (200 votes), among the 16,600 ballots cast by the city's 49,230 registered voters (361 ballots were spoiled), for turnout of 34.5%.

United States Senate election results for Clifton1
Year	Republican		Democratic		Third party(ies)	
Year	No.	%	No.	%	No.	%
2024	14,729	43.90%	16,985	50.63%	1,836	5.47%
2018	9,357	35.96%	14,701	56.49%	1,964	7.55%
2012	8,666	32.49%	17,379	65.16%	626	2.35%
2006	7,353	42.18%	9,740	55.88%	338	1.94%

United States Senate election results for Clifton2
Year	Republican		Democratic		Third party(ies)	
Year	No.	%	No.	%	No.	%
2020	13,909	35.07%	24,407	61.54%	1,347	3.40%
2014	5,203	36.44%	8,706	60.97%	370	2.59%
2013	4,206	42.05%	5,670	56.69%	126	1.26%
2008	10,219	36.53%	17,048	60.95%	705	2.52%

== Education ==
The Clifton Public Schools serve students in pre-kindergarten through twelfth grade. As of the 2020–21 school year, the district, comprised of 18 schools, had an enrollment of 10,514 students and 870.5 classroom teachers (on an FTE basis), for a student–teacher ratio of 12.1:1. Schools in the district (with 2020–21 enrollment data from the National Center for Education Statistics) are Clifton Early Learner Academy (377 students; in grades Pre-K), School One (245; K–5), School Two (385; K–5), School Three (282; K–5), School Four (141; K–5), School Five (373; K–5), School Eight (169; Pre-K–5), School Nine (285; K–5), School Eleven (415; K–5), School Twelve (616; Pre-K–5), School Thirteen (447; K–5), School Fourteen (356; K–5), School Fifteen (310; Pre-K–5), School Sixteen (195; K–5), School Seventeen (476; Pre-K–5), Christopher Columbus Middle School (1,172; 6–8), Woodrow Wilson Middle School (1,276; 6–8) and Clifton High School (2,891; 9–12).

With more than 3,300 students enrolled in 2006, Clifton High School was the largest single-facility high school in New Jersey; Elizabeth High School had more students, but they were spread over multiple campuses before the school was split into separate academies. An additional overflow site, the Clifton High School Annex, was constructed at a cost of $17 million and opened in September 2009 to accommodate 540 of the school year's 850 incoming ninth graders to alleviate overcrowding.

Classical Academy Charter School of Clifton, a charter school founded in 1998 for Clifton residents that provides an education based on the classics to students in sixth through eighth grades, was recognized in 2008 by the National Blue Ribbon Schools Program.

Private schools in Clifton include Saint Philip Preparatory School, a K–8 elementary school that operates under the auspices of the Roman Catholic Diocese of Paterson. St. Andrew the Apostle School was closed after the 2017–2018 school year due to financial challenges and a decline in the number of students registering for the new school year. St. Brendan Catholic School, which opened in 1946, was closed after the 2018–2019 school year and merged with the Academy of St. James in Totowa, with the merged school to be called The Academy of St. James and St. Brendan.

== Emergency services ==
The Clifton Police Department is a full-service department, and employs 159 sworn officers, 20 public safety telecommunicators, 12 civilian officers, and 25 part-time special officers. The department is led by Chief Thomas Rinaldi, who was named to the position in February 2020, and made full-time June 1, 2020.

The Clifton Fire Department has 143 full-time firefighters. The department operates a fleet of five engines, two ladders, and three basic life support ambulances 24/7, along with three marine rescue boats, a foam pumper and tender, light rescue truck, and haz-mat unit, which are cross staffed. The department is led by Chief Frank S. Prezioso.

Hatzolah of Passaic/Clifton EMS is a volunteer service that primarily covers the Passaic Park neighborhood of Passaic, and parts of Clifton. Hatzolah operates two ambulances strategically parked throughout the community, with a third on standby, available to assist neighboring chapters such as Union City and Elizabeth.

== Transportation ==
=== Roads and highways ===
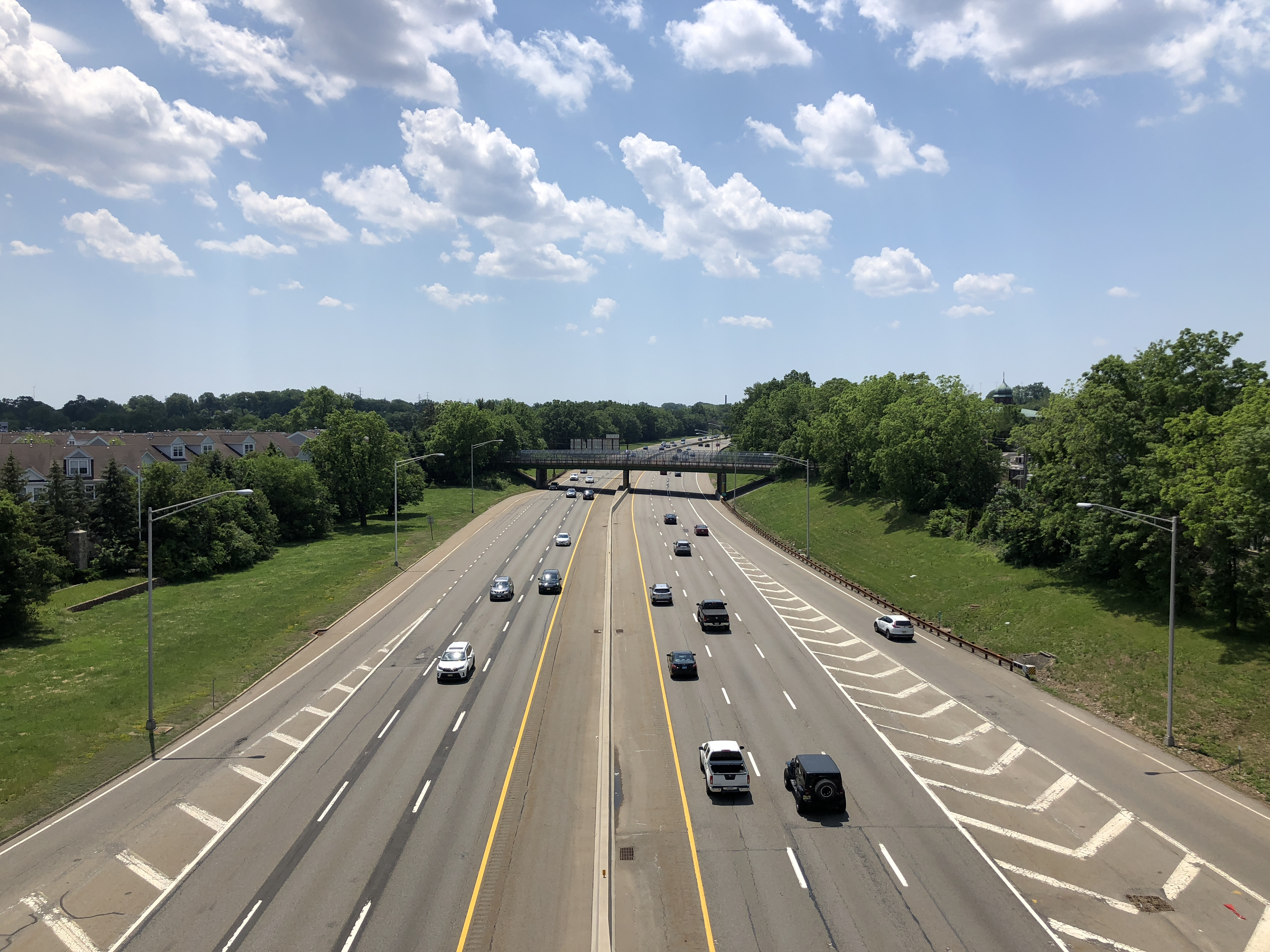
The Garden State Parkway southbound in Clifton

As of May 2010, the city had a total of 199.94 miles (321.77 km) of roadways, of which 145.43 miles (234.05 km) were maintained by the municipality, 35.95 miles (57.86 km) by Passaic County, 14.06 miles (22.63 km) by the New Jersey Department of Transportation and 4.50 miles (7.24 km) by the New Jersey Turnpike Authority.

Major roadways in the city include Route 3 (which crosses from east to west along the southern portion of the city), Route 21 (along the Passaic River), Route 19 in the city's northwest and U.S. Route 46. The Garden State Parkway crosses the city, connecting Bloomfield in Essex County to the south to Elmwood Park in Bergen County in the north. Parkway interchanges 153 (signed for Route 3 and Route 46 West) / 153A (for Route 3 East) / 153B (for Route 3 and Route 46 West), 154 (for Route 46), 155 (for Clifton) / 155P (for Passaic) and 156 (to Route 46).

=== Public transportation ===
NJ Transit trains at the Clifton station and Delawanna station follow the NJ Transit Main Line to Suffern and Hoboken Terminal. Until 1966, the Newark Branch of the Erie-Lackawanna Railroad served several stations in the town, Athenia (Colfax Avenue) and Allwood. The Newark Branch tracks are now used for freight only, operated by Norfolk Southern.

NJ Transit provides bus service on the 190, 191, 192 and 195 routes to the Port Authority Bus Terminal in Midtown Manhattan, to Newark on the 13, 27 and 72 routes, and local service on the 74, 702, 703, 705, 707, 709, 744 routes.

DeCamp Bus Lines provided service on the 33 and 66 routes to the Port Authority Bus Terminal in Midtown Manhattan, until discontinuing its commuter routes in April 2023.

== In popular culture ==
- The character of Rupert Pupkin in Martin Scorsese's film The King of Comedy comes from Clifton.
- The movie Donnie Brasco, which starred Johnny Depp and Al Pacino, was filmed partially in Clifton in 1996.
- Many scenes from The Sopranos were filmed in the town, including the Main Memorial Park and Clifton High School. The golf scenes were filmed at the Upper Montclair Country Club.
- New York Yankee Hall of Famers Yogi Berra and Phil Rizzuto owned a bowling alley in Clifton called "Rizzuto-Berra Bowling Lanes." The alley, later known as Astro Bowl, was located in the Styertowne Shopping Center in the Allwood section of town and remained open until 1999.
- The Upper Montclair Country Club was home to the NFL Golf Classic and the Thunderbird Classic. The Sybase Classic golf tournament was held there annually until 2009.
- Baseball Hall of Famer Honus Wagner played his last two seasons (1896–1897) of minor league baseball for the Paterson Silk Sox. While the team was named Paterson, the team played their games at Doherty Field, located off of Main Avenue behind the Doherty Silk Mill.
- Clifton has an old sewerage system, accessible to intrepid urban explorers and evidently not actively maintained by any municipal authority or utility, known to some as the "Gates Of Hell." The walls are full of graffiti. The Clifton "Gates of Hell" are featured in the 2003 book Weird N.J.: Your Travel Guide to New Jersey's Local Legends and Best Kept Secrets, published by Weird New Jersey.

== Notable people ==
People who were born in, residents of, or otherwise closely associated with Clifton include:

- Jay Alford (born 1983), defensive lineman and long snapper for the Super Bowl XLII champion New York Giants
- Hubert Alyea (1903–1996), professor of chemistry at Princeton University, whose explosive chemistry demonstrations inspired the title character in the 1961 film The Absent-Minded Professor
- Nina Arianda (born 1984), film and theatrical actress
- Greg Bajek (born 1968), retired soccer player and coach who owned the Jersey Falcons in the USL Premier Development League
- William J. Bate (1934–2011), politician who served as a state senator, assemblyman, and judge
- Sofia Black-D'Elia (born 1991), actress; played Tea Marvelli in Skins, Sage Spence in Gossip Girl and Andrea Cornish in The Night Of
- Jonathan Borrajo (born 1987), soccer wingback / defensive midfielder who played for the New York Red Bulls
- Todd Brewster, author, journalist, former Senior Editorial Producer for ABC News
- Jessica Bruder, journalist who writes about subcultures and teaches narrative writing at Columbia Journalism School
- Russ Carroccio (1931–1994), football offensive lineman who played in the NFL for the New York Giants and the Philadelphia Eagles *
- Rubin Carter (1937–2014), professional boxer, author, motivational speaker and activist; the subject of the Bob Dylan song "Hurricane"
- David Chase (born 1945), creator of The Sopranos
- Bartolo Colón (born 1973), pitcher for the New York Mets
- Dow H. Drukker (1872–1963), represented New Jersey's 6th congressional district 1914–1919
- Peter C. Eagler (1954–2024), politician who represented the 34th legislative district in the New Jersey General Assembly from 2002 to 2006
- Lew Erber (1934–1990), American football coach who was offensive coordinator for the New England Patriots and won two Super Bowls with the Oakland Raiders
- Vera Farmiga (born 1973), actress and director
- John Feikens (1917–2011), United States district judge of the United States District Court for the Eastern District of Michigan
- Hector Fonseca (born 1980), DJ and music producer
- Dan Garrett, head football coach for Kean University Cougars football team
- Gary Geld (born 1935), composer known for his work creating musicals and popular songs with his lyricist partner Peter Udell.
- Richard Godwin (1922–2005), the first Under Secretary of Defense for Acquisition, Technology and Logistics
- Bob Holly (born 1960), former quarterback in the NFL for the Washington Redskins, Philadelphia Eagles and Atlanta Falcons
- Jay Horwitz (born 1945), former media relations director for the New York Mets
- Tommy James (born 1947), musician, singer / songwriter and record producer, best known for such songs as "Mony Mony" as leader of Tommy James and the Shondells
- Father Mychal F. Judge (1933–2001), FDNY Chaplain; first official death of the September 11, 2001, terrorist attacks on the World Trade Center
- Karin Korb (born 1967), retired wheelchair tennis player who twice competed at the Summer Paralympics
- Stephen Kovacs (1972–2022), saber fencer and fencing coach, charged with sexual assault, died in prison
- Wojtek Krakowiak (born 1976), retired Polish-American soccer midfielder who was the head coach of the Montana State University Billings women's soccer team after playing professionally in Major League Soccer
- Garret Kramer, author and performance coach
- Stan Lembryk (born 1969), retired professional soccer player
- Sue Macy (born 1954), author, whose 2019 book, The Book Rescuer, won the Sydney Taylor Book Award from the Association of Jewish Libraries
- Ernest Mario (born 1938), pharmaceutical executive
- Ronald F. Maxwell (born 1949), movie director
- Kayla Meneghin (born 1994) ice hockey forward who played for the Buffalo Beauts of the Premier Hockey Federation
- Matt Miazga (born 1995), defender for Chelsea F.C. in Premier League
- Geri Miller (born 1942), former go-go dancer and actress
- Adam Najem (born 1995), professional footballer who plays as a midfielder for FC Edmonton and the Afghanistan national team
- David Najem (born 1992), soccer player who plays as a midfielder for the New York Red Bulls II in the USL
- Chris Opperman (born 1978), modern composer; performed on Steve Vai's Grammy-nominated composition "Lotus Feet"; grew up in Clifton and attended CHS
- Jazlyn Oviedo (born 2002), footballer who plays as a midfielder for the Dominican Republic women's national team
- Morris Pashman (1912–1999), New Jersey Supreme Court justice and mayor of Passaic
- Angelo Paternoster (1919–2012), offensive tackle for the Washington Redskins; went on to practice dentistry in Clifton
- Nikki Phillips (born 1987), American-born Polish soccer defender and midfielder, who has played with FC Kansas City in the National Women's Soccer League and for the Poland national team
- Michael J. Pollard (1939–2019), character actor and comedian who played C.W. Moss in the 1967 film Bonnie and Clyde, for which he received an Academy Award for Best Supporting Actor nomination
- Anthony Provenzano (1917–1988), International Brotherhood of Teamsters official and mobster who was allegedly associated with the disappearance of Jimmy Hoffa
- Pamela Radcliff (born 1956), historian and professor at the University of California at San Diego; an authority on the history of modern Spain
- Norman M. Robertson (born 1951), politician who served on the Passaic County Board of Chosen Freeholders and later in the New Jersey State Senate, 1997–2001
- Giuseppe Rossi (born 1987), Italian American soccer player
- Miriam Sandler, singer and dancer; prolific backup singer during the 1990s for Latin pop artists such as Jon Secada and Gloria Estefan
- Jon Seda (born 1970), actor best known for his roles in NBC's Homicide: Life on the Street and the movie Selena
- James P. Shenton (1925–2003), historian of nineteenth-and twentieth-century America and professor at Columbia University
- Steve Smith (born 1985), wide receiver for the New York Football Giants
- Jimmy Snuka (1943–2017), professional wrestler
- William Staub (1915–2012), inventor of the home treadmill
- Gloria Struck (born 1925), Motorcycle Hall of Fame inductee
- Walt Szot (1920–1981), football tackle who played five seasons in the National Football League with the Chicago Cardinals and Pittsburgh Steelers
- Dave Szott (born 1967), former NFL offensive lineman who played for the New York Jets
- Patricia Travers (1927–2010), classical violinist
- Paul L. Troast (1894–1972), building contractor, chairman of the New Jersey Turnpike Authority during its construction, and one-time failed gubernatorial candidate in 1953
- Joe Lynn Turner (born 1951), singer
- Lawrence Tynes (born 1978), former NFL kicker who played for the New York Giants
- Dave White (born 1979), mystery author and educator
- Ivan Wilzig (born 1956), techno musician
- Gerald H. Zecker (born 1942), member of the New Jersey General Assembly; mayor of Clifton 1978–1982
- Rachel Zegler (born 2001), actress starring in Stephen Spielberg's film adaptation of West Side Story
