= 2013 USASA Region II National Cup =

Tournament details
- Country: United States
- Teams: 6

The 2013 USASA Region II National Cup is a qualifying tournament that will determine which clubs from the second region of the United States Adult Soccer Association qualified for the first round proper of the 2013 U.S. Open Cup. The Region II National Cup's first round matches took place on 6 April 2012 with the 2nd round match taking place on 20 April 2012.

== Qualification ==
Subregion	Tournament	Winner	Ref
Illinois		RWB Adria	
Indiana		FC Indiana	
Kansas		KC Athletics	
Michigan		Dearborn Stars	
Southern Ohio		Cincy Saints	
Wisconsin		Croatian Eagles	

== Bracket ==
First Round
(Wisconsin)	Croatian Eagles	0
(Illinois)	RWB Adria	2
(Ohio)	Cincy Saints	0
(Michigan)	Dearborn Stars	5
(Indiana)	FC Indiana	1
(Kansas)	KC Athletics	3

Semifinals
(Illinois)	RWB Adria	2
(Indiana)	FC Indiana	1
(Michigan)	Dearborn Stars	ADV°
(Kansas)	KC Athletics	DQ°

Qualified
(Illinois)	RWB Adria
(Michigan)	Dearborn Stars

°The Dearborn Stars advanced after a successful protest about the size of the field in Kansas. KC Athletics originally won the match 1–0. KC Athletics withdrew from the competition when a reply of the match was ordered to happen in Chicago.

== See also ==
- 2013 U.S. Open Cup
- 2013 U.S. Open Cup qualification
- United States Adult Soccer Association
