= 2013 USASA Region IV National Cup =

Tournament details
- Country: United States
- Teams: 6

Tournament statistics
- Matches played: 10

The 2013 USASA Region IV National Cup is a qualifying tournament that will determine which clubs from the fourth region of the United States Adult Soccer Association qualify for the first round proper of the 2013 U.S. Open Cup. The Region IV National Cup will take place 19–20 April 2013 with the final taking place on 21 April 2013.

== Qualification ==
- Cal FC (CA-South)
- Doxa Italia (CA-South)
- DV8 Defenders (CA-North)
- Internationalists (CA-South)
- PSA Elite (CA-South)
- San Francisco City (CA-North)

== Matches ==
The group winners will advance to the US Open Cup.

=== Group A ===
Team	Pld	W	D	L	GF	GA	GD	Pts
(California) Doxa Italia	3	2	0	1	9	4	+5	6
(California) Cal FC	3	2	0	1	16	6	+10	6
(California) San Francisco City	3	1	0	2	7	20	-13	3

=== Group B ===
Team	Pld	W	D	L	GF	GA	GD	Pts
(California) PSA Elite	3	3	0	0	22	3	+19	9
(California) DV8 Defenders	3	1	0	2	11	15	-4	3
(California) Internationalists	3	0	0	3	4	22	-18	0

19 April 2013
16:00

Doxa Italia	0–3	PSA Elite

Ontario, California

19 April 2013
18:00

The Internationalists	2–8	DV8 Defenders

Ontario, California

19 April 2013
18:00

Cal FC	12–3	San Francisco City

Ontario, California
Referee: Michael Zapata

20 April 2013
12:00

San Francisco City	0-7	Doxa Italia

Ontario, California
Referee: Reyna Fonseca

20 April 2013
12:00

DV8 Defenders	1-3	Cal FC

Ontario, California

20 April 2013
14:00

PSA Elite	10-1	The Internationalists

Ontario, California

20 April 2013
18:00

Cal FC	1-2	Doxa Italia

Ontario, California
Referee: Farhad Dahdko

20 April 2013
20:00

PSA Elite	9-2	DV8 Defenders

Ontario, California

20 April 2013
20:00

San Francisco City	4-1	The Internationalists

Ontario, California
Referee: Alexander De Angel

21 April 2013
13:00

Doxa Italia	1-4	PSA Elite

Ontario, California
Referee: Berni Hosu

== See also ==
- 2013 U.S. Open Cup
- 2013 U.S. Open Cup qualification
- United States Adult Soccer Association
