= Dave White (writer, born 1979) =

American novelist

Dave White (born 1979) is a mystery author and educator. White, an eighth grade teacher for the Clifton Public Schools, has written two novels featuring former New Brunswick, New Jersey police detective turned private investigator Jackson Donne. The novels take place in locations around northern New Jersey.

White grew up in Clifton, New Jersey, and graduated from Clifton High School in 1997. He attended Rutgers University and received his MAT from Montclair State University

White's two novels follow the characters established in his 2002 short story "Closure," which won the Derringer Award for Best Short Mystery Story the following year. Publishers Weekly has given both novels starred reviews calling When One Man Dies an "engrossing, evocative debut novel" and writing that his second novel "fulfills the promise of his debut." Roland Person writes in his Library Journal review that "his first novel is awkwardly written and marred by contradictions and improbable events."

== Bibliography ==
- When One Man Dies. New York, NY: Three Rivers Press. 2007. ISBN 978-0-307-38278-8.
- The Evil That Men Do: A Jackson Donne Novel. New York, NY: Three Rivers Press. 2008. ISBN 978-0-307-38279-5.
