= 2013 USASA Region I National Cup =

Tournament details
- Country: United States
- Teams: 8

The 2013 USASA Region I National Cup was a qualifying tournament to determine which clubs from the first region of the United States Adult Soccer Association would qualify for the first round proper of the 2013 U.S. Open Cup.

Two teams from Region I qualified for the U.S. Open Cup in May. The winner then qualified for the National Finals.

== Qualification ==
Subregion	Tournament	Winner	Ref
Connecticut	2013 Connecticut Open Cup	Newtown Pride FC	
(New York (state)) Eastern New York	2013 Eastern New York Open Cup	New York Pancyprian-Freedoms	
Eastern Pennsylvania	2013 Eastern Pennsylvania Open Cup	West Chester United	
Maryland	2013 Maryland Open Cup	Screaming Eagles	
Massachusetts	2013 Massachusetts Open Cup	Massachusetts Premier Soccer	
New Jersey	2013 New Jersey Open Cup	Icon FC	
Rhode Island	2013 Rhode Island Open Cup	Rhode Island Reds F.C.	
(Washington, D.C.) Washington D.C. / Virginia	2013 Washington D.C./Virginia Open Cup	Aegean Hawks	

== Bracket ==
Quarterfinals
(New York (state))	New York Pancyprian-Freedoms	0(6)≈
(Connecticut)	Newtown Pride FC	0(7)≈
(Massachusetts)	Massachusetts Premier Soccer	1
(Rhode Island)	Rhode Island Reds F.C.	0
(New Jersey)	Icon FC	4
(Pennsylvania)	West Chester United	2
(Virginia)	Aegean Hawks	ADV
(Maryland)	Screaming Eagles	DQ°

Semifinals
(Connecticut)	Newtown Pride FC	0
(Massachusetts)	Massachusetts Premier Soccer	6
(New Jersey)	Icon FC	1(7)
(Virginia)	Aegean Hawks	1(6)

Qualifiers
(Massachusetts)	Massachusetts Premier Soccer
(New Jersey)	Icon FC

≈ NY originally won 1-0 but there was an issue at the league level that caused the decision to replay the game.
° The Screaming Eagles were disqualified due to fielding ineligible players. The Aegean Hawks were advanced in their place.

=== Matches ===
April 7, 2013 Match 1	Newtown Pride FC	0-1	New York Pancyprian-Freedoms	Newtown, Connecticut
16:00 EDT UTC-4		New York Pancyprian Freedoms forfeited for using an ineligible player, decision overturned, replay ordered		Stadium: Treadwell Park

April 21, 2013 Match 1 Replay	Newtown Pride FC	0-0	New York Pancyprian-Freedoms	Newtown, Connecticut
15:00 EDT UTC-4		Newtown Pride FC won 7-6 on penalties		Stadium: Newtown High School

April 7, 2013 Match 2	Rhode Island Reds FC	0-1	Mass Premier Soccer	Cranston, Rhode Island
14:00 EDT UTC-4		Newtown Pride FC won 7-6 on penalties		Stadium: Cranston Stadium

April 7, 2013 Match 3	West Chester United	2-4	Icon FC	West Chester, Pennsylvania
14:00 EDT UTC-4				Stadium: Delacy Soccer Complex No. 4

April 7, 2013 Match 4	Screaming Eagles	1-0	Aegean Hawks	Bel Air, Maryland
13:30 EDT UTC-4		Screaming Eagles forfeited for using ineligible players		Stadium: Cedar Lane Regional Park

April 21, 2013 Match 5	Icon FC	1-1	Aegean Hawks	Montville, New Jersey
18:00 EDT UTC-4		Icon F C won 7-6 on penalties		Stadium: Montville Community Park

April 28, 2013 Match 6	Mass Premier Soccer	6-0	Newtown Pride FC	Framingham, Massachusetts
15:00 EDT UTC-4				Stadium: Framingham State College

June 16, 2013 Match 7	Mass Premier Soccer	1-2	Icon FC	Horsham, Pennsylvania
13:00 EDT UTC-4				Stadium: Ukrainian Americans Sports Center

== See also ==
- 2013 U.S. Open Cup
- 2013 U.S. Open Cup qualification
- United States Adult Soccer Association
