= Ernest Mario =

American businessman (1938–2024)

Ernest Mario (June 12, 1938 – October 20, 2024) was an American pharmaceutical industry executive and the recipient of the 2007 Remington Honor Medal awarded by the American Pharmacists Association.

== Early life and education ==
Ernest Mario grew up in Northern New Jersey, attending an elementary school of the Clifton Public Schools, then at 16, Christopher Columbus Middle School and Clifton High School. He received a Bachelor of Science in pharmacy from Rutgers University, and master's and Ph.D. degrees in physical chemistry from the University of Rhode Island. As a youth, he earned the rank of Eagle Scout in the Boy Scouts of America in 1954; he was awarded the Distinguished Eagle Scout Award in 2000 for his service to youth.

== Career in the pharmaceutical industry ==
Mario was a registered pharmacist in the State of New York and worked as a community pharmacist during his early career.

After completing his graduate work, he began a career in the pharmaceutical industry, beginning as a researcher for Strasenburgh Laboratories in Rochester, New York. He subsequently held positions with SmithKline & French in Philadelphia, PA; E.R. Squibb & Sons in New Brunswick, NJ and Princeton, NJ; and Glaxo Inc. in Research Triangle Park, North Carolina.

From 1989 to 1993, he was the chief executive of Glaxo Holdings, plc., a company headquartered in London, England. He served as deputy chairman of the board and CEO of Glaxo Holdings from 1992 to 1993. He was the chairman and CEO of Alza Corporation, based in Palo Alto, California, from 1993 until the company was purchased by Johnson & Johnson, Inc., in 2001. After Alza, Mario became chairman and CEO of Reliant Pharmaceuticals, based in Liberty Corner, New Jersey. He was also the non-executive chairman of Pharmaceutical Product Development, Inc, based in Wilmington, North Carolina, from 1993 to 2009. In April 2010, he was appointed to the board of directors for Vivus Pharmaceuticals. He has served on numerous other public corporate boards, as well as several non-profits.

== Trustee of Duke University ==
Mario served as a trustee of Duke University from 1989 to 2007, and chaired the Duke University Health System board of trustees from its inception until 2007. On July 1, 2007, he became a trustee emeritus of Duke University. In 2009 he was awarded The University Medal, Duke's highest recognition of service to the school. His 18 years on the Duke University board made him the second longest serving trustee in the school's history. (Note: The longest tenure belongs to Mary Duke Biddle Trent Semans (1961–1981), great granddaughter of Washington Duke, for whom the school is named.)Duke lowered its flag to half mast on October 22, 2024 to honor his legacy of service to the university and the health system.

== Death ==
Mario died of pancreatic cancer at his son’s home in Durham, North Carolina, on October 20, 2024, at the age of 86. He had been diagnosed with the cancer six months earlier.

A memorial was held on December 7th, 2024, at the Edith Memorial Chapel on the campus of The Lawrenceville School in Lawrenceville, NJ, for both Ernest and his wife of 59 years, Mildred Mario. Mildred died on April 17th, 2020, but had no prior memorial due to the COVID pandemic.

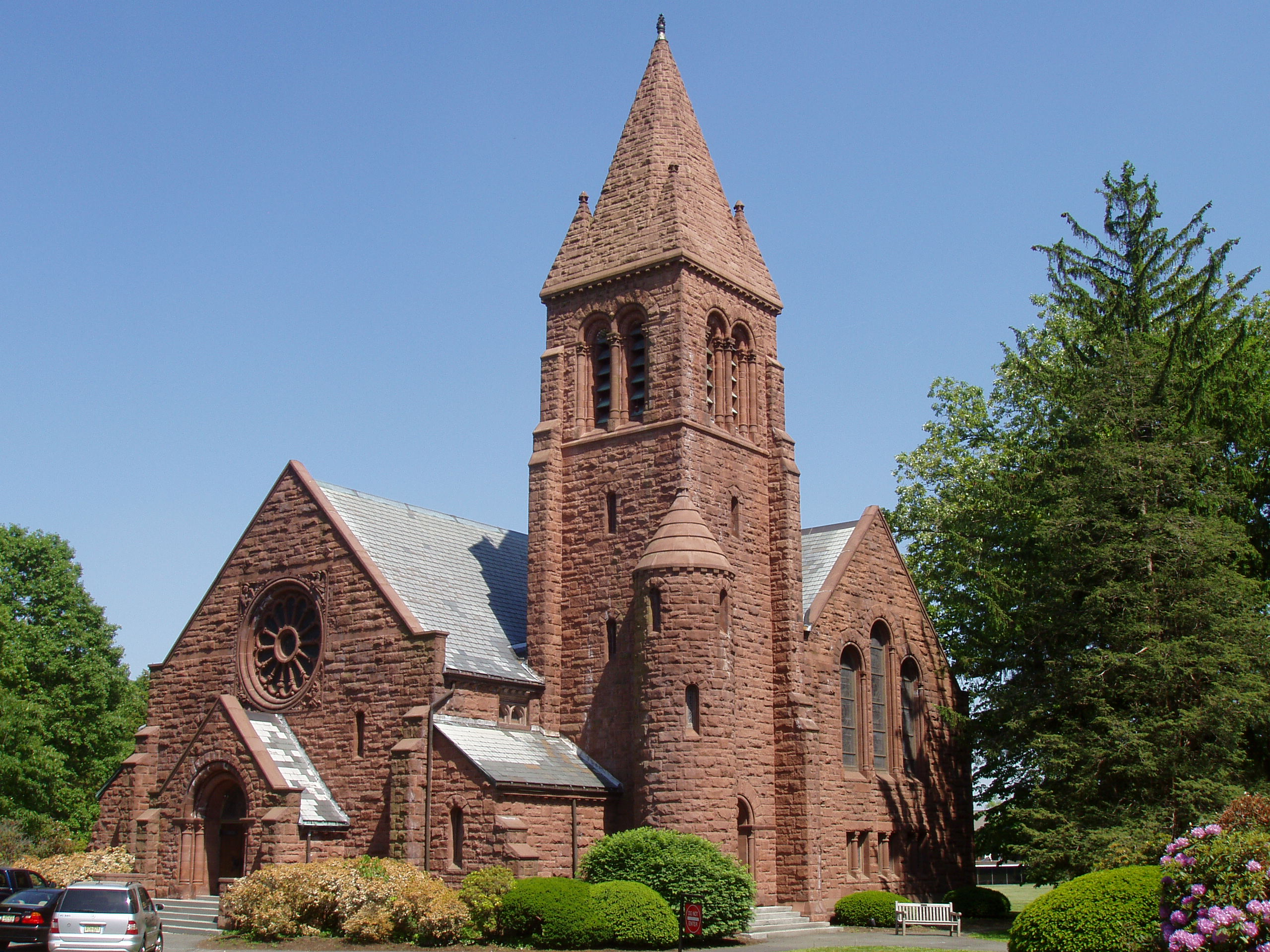
Edith Memorial Chapel at Lawrenceville

== Awards and honors ==
Mario held numerous civic and public health positions, including chair of the American Lung Association and chair of the American Foundation for Pharmaceutical Education. Mario advised the schools of pharmacy at the University of Maryland, University of Rhode Island, and Rutgers University.

In December 2001, the Rutgers University College of Pharmacy was renamed the Ernest Mario School of Pharmacy at Rutgers University in honor of him.

The rotunda of the headquarters of the American Pharmacists Association in Washington, D.C., is named after him.

In 2007, Mario was recognized for a lifetime of service to the profession of pharmacy when the American Pharmacists Association awarded him the Remington Medal, the highest award in professional pharmacy. He is the 79th Remington Medalist.
