= James P. Shenton =

American historian

James Patrick Shenton
- Born: March 17, 1925; Passaic, New Jersey or Clifton, New Jersey
- Died: July 25, 2003 (aged 78); Passaic, New Jersey

Academic background
- Education: Columbia University (BA, MA, PhD)

Academic work
- Discipline: American history
- Institutions: Columbia University
- Notable students: Eric Foner; Sean Wilentz; Thomas Sugrue; John R. MacArthur

James Patrick Shenton (March 17, 1925 – July 25, 2003) was a historian of nineteenth-and twentieth-century America. He was a professor at Columbia University.

== Biography ==
Shenton was born on March 17, 1925, in either Passaic, New Jersey or Clifton, New Jersey, the oldest of four children. His father was English and his mother was Slovak.

Raised in Clifton, Shenton graduated in 1942 from Clifton High School, where he received an award in American history from the Daughters of the American Revolution. He served in the United States Army Medical Corps in Europe during World War II and was one of the first Americans to enter the Buchenwald concentration camp.

Shenton entered Columbia in 1946 on the G.I. Bill, graduating in 1949, and went on to earn a master's in 1950 and a Ph.D. in 1954, all from Columbia University. He joined the Columbia faculty as an associate professor of history in 1951 and in 1967 was promoted to professor of American history. He helped found the Double Discovery Center, a tutoring and mentoring program for low-income teenagers in New York City.

Shenton was a highly popular and respected figure at Columbia. His expertise included Civil War, Reconstruction, the history of radical movements, immigration and World War II. Among his students were Bancroft Prize winners Eric Foner, Sean Wilentz, and Thomas Sugrue, Harper's Magazine publisher John R. MacArthur.

Shenton was also politically active and led voter registration drives in South Carolina and took part in the Selma to Montgomery marches with his students. He retired from teaching in 1996.

Shenton died at St. Joseph's Hospital in Paterson, New Jersey, on July 25, 2003, at the age of 78.
