= Stan Lembryk =

American soccer player

Personal information
- Full name: Stan Lembryk
- Date of birth: August 8, 1969 (age 57)
- Place of birth: Clifton, New Jersey, United States
- Height: 5 ft 8 in (1.73 m)
- Position: Midfielder

Youth career
- Loyola Greyhounds

Senior career*
Years	Team	Apps	(Gls)
1991	Maryland Bays		
1993–1995	Fort Lauderdale Strikers		
1996	MetroStars	1	(0)
- * Club domestic league appearances and goals

Stan Lembryk (born August 8, 1969, in Clifton, New Jersey) is an American retired professional soccer player.

== Early life ==
Lembryk played soccer at Clifton High School under coach, Fernando Rossi.

== Coaching ==
After retiring from active play, Lembryk has coached in the New York Red Bulls academy. He currently is the head coach of soccer and school teacher of special education at Clifton High School.

== Statistics ==
Club performance			League		Cup		League Cup		Continental		Total	
Season	Club	League	Apps	Goals	Apps	Goals	Apps	Goals	Apps	Goals	Apps	Goals
USA			League		Open Cup		League Cup		North America		Total	
1996	MetroStars	MLS	1	0	0	0	0	0	0	0	1	0
Career total			1	0	0	0	0	0	0	0	1	0
