= Dave Szott =

American football player (born 1967)

No. 79
- Position: Guard

Personal information
- Born: December 12, 1967 (age 58); Passaic, New Jersey, U.S.
- Listed height: 6 ft 4 in (1.93 m)
- Listed weight: 289 lb (131 kg)

Career information
- High school: Clifton (NJ)
- College: Penn State
- NFL draft: 1990: 7th round, 180th overall pick

Career history
- Kansas City Chiefs (1990–2000); Washington Redskins (2001); New York Jets (2002–2003)

Awards and highlights
- USA Today All American (1986); Parade Magazine All American (1986); Amateur Wrestling News All American (1986); National champion (1986); 1989 1st Team All East; PFWA All-Rookie Team (1990); 1996 Ed Block Courage Award - Kansas City Chiefs; 1996 Walter Payton Man of the Year Award- Kansas City Chiefs; 1997 Pro Football Weekly 1st Team All Pro; 1997 1st Team All Pro; 1997 PFT Top Rated NFL Guard; 2000 NJ Sports Writers Distinguished Pro Lineman; 2003 Ed Block Courage Award- New York Jets; 2008 & 2009 Awarded by NFL for Outstanding Player Engagement Programs; 2012 NJSIAA NJ Sports Hall of Fame Inductee

Career NFL statistics
- Games Played: 177
- Games Started: 171
- Fumble recoveries: 5
- Stats at Pro Football Reference

David Andrew Szott (born December 12, 1967) is an American former professional football player who was a guard for 14 seasons in the National Football League (NFL). He played college football for the Penn State Nittany Lions.

Szott was selected by the Kansas City Chiefs in the seventh round of the 1990 NFL draft with the 180th overall pick. Szott played in the NFL for the Chiefs, Washington Redskins, and New York Jets, before retiring from football in February 2004. He remained with the Jets as an offensive line coach and in player development. Szott became the team's chaplain in 2006.

Szott played college football at Pennsylvania State University for legendary football coach Joe Paterno.

Szott grew up in Clifton, New Jersey, and was a standout player at Clifton High School in New Jersey. He was also a standout high school wrestler in New Jersey placing fourth in the heavyweight division of the 1986 USA Wrestling Junior Freestyle Tournament. Szott was undefeated until the round robin portion where he was pinned by eventual champion John Matyiko of Virginia. Szott then was pinned by Carl Presley of Illinois in the semi-finals and settled for fourth place while losing by fall to Jon Morris of Virginia.

== Personal life ==
His older brother is Kevin Szott, a Paralympic judoka, former goalball player, shot put thrower and a winner of five Paralympic Games medals. Szott and his wife, Andrea, have two children, the older of whom has cerebral palsy. He is a tireless fundraiser for charitable causes related to the disorder. Josh, the youngest, is 20 years old and plays wide receiver for Colgate University.
