= Dan Garrett =

American football coach

Current position
- Title: Head coach
- Team: Kean
- Conference: NJAC
- Record: 87–109

Playing career
- 1993–1996: Montclair State
- Positions: Linebacker, defensive end

Coaching career (HC unless noted)
- 1997–2002: Montclair State (assistant)
- 2003–2005: Kean (DC)
- 2006–present: Kean

Head coaching record
- Overall: 87–109
- Bowls: 3–1
- Tournaments: 1–1 (NCAA D-III playoffs)

Accomplishments and honors

Championships
- 1 NJAC (2011)

Awards
- Division III Assistant Coach of the Year (2005); 3× NJAC Coach of the Year (2006, 2011, 2021)

Dan Garrett is an American college football coach. He is the head football coach for Kean University, a position he has held since 2006.

Garrett grew up in Clifton, New Jersey, where he played football at Clifton High School. After playing collegiate football for the Montclair State Red Hawks football team, Garrett played for the Nuremberg Rams of the German Football League and the Trenton Lightning of the Indoor Professional Football League.

== Head coaching record ==
Year	Team	Overall	Conference	Standing	Bowl/playoffs	D3^{#}
Kean Cougars (New Jersey Athletic Conference) (2006–present)
2006	Kean	7–4	4–3	4th	W Southeast	
2007	Kean	5–5	3–4	T–4th		
2008	Kean	7–4	6–3	T–4th	L South Atlantic	
2009	Kean	9–2	8–1	2nd		
2010	Kean	5–5	5–4	T–4th		
2011	Kean	10–2	8–1	1st	L NCAA Division III Second Round	10
2012	Kean	5–4	5–2	3rd		
2013	Kean	2–8	1–6	T–7th		
2014	Kean	2–8	2–5	T–5th		
2015	Kean	8–3	6–3	3rd	W Presidents	
2016	Kean	7–4	5–4	T–5th	W Clayton Chapman	
2017	Kean	4–6	4–5	T–5th		
2018	Kean	1–9	1–8	9th		
2019	Kean	3–7	2–5	T–5th		
2020–21	Kean	0–1	0–1	T–4th		
2021	Kean	4–5	4–2	2nd		
2022	Kean	3–7	2–4	T–4th		
2023	Kean	0–10	0–6	7th		
2024	Kean	2–8	2–4	5th		
2025	Kean	3–7	2–5	6th		
2026	Kean	0–0	0–0			
Kean:		87–109	70–76			
Total:		87–109				
National championship Conference title Conference division title or championship game berth
