= Icon FC =

- Full name: Icon Football Club
- Nickname(s): Sky Blues, Cielo Azul
- Founded: 2010
- Ground: Boverini Stadium
- Capacity: 3,000
- President: Greg Bajek
- Head Coach: Greg Bajek
- League: American Soccer League
- Website: http://www.aslsoccer.org/icon-fc

Icon Football Club is an American soccer team based in Montville, New Jersey. It was announced in May 2014 the club would join the professional American Soccer League beginning with the 2014-15 season.

Icon FC competed in the Garden State Soccer League, a United States Adult Soccer Association fifth-tier league from 2010-14.

== U.S. Open Cup ==
The club is best known for their performances in the 2013 Lamar Hunt U.S. Open Cup which they qualified for by advancing to the final of the 2013 USASA Region I National Cup. Their striker, Argjent Duka (brother of Chicago Fire midfielder Dilly Duka), finished tied for third among the top scorers with four goals in two matches.

== U.S. Open Cup results ==
| Date | Tournament Stage | Opponent | Result |
|---|---|---|---|
| May 14, 2013 | 1st Round | Brooklyn Italians (NPSL) | Won, 4-1 |
| May 21, 2013 | 2nd Round | Richmond Kickers (USL PRO) | Lost, 1-4 |
| May 14, 2014 | 2nd Round | Baltimore Bohemians (PDL) | Lost, 1-4 |

== Season-by-season ==
| Season | League | W | D | L | Result | Playoffs |
|---|---|---|---|---|---|---|
| 2014-15 | ASL | 10 | 4 | 4 | 2nd | Won ASL Cup (defeated Western Mass Pro) |
