= Hubert Alyea =

American professor of chemistry (1903-1996)

Hubert Newcombe Alyea (October 10, 1903 – October 19, 1996) was an American professor of chemistry at Princeton University. His explosive chemistry demonstrations earned him the nickname "Dr. Boom". He was known for his frequent public lectures on science, which he gave around the world, including "Lucky Accidents, Great Discoveries and the Prepared Mind". His talks were described as "zany, eccentric" and "as much performance as professorship". Alyea served as inspiration for the title character in the 1961 film The Absent-Minded Professor after Walt Disney was present at one of his demonstrations.

In 1984, Alyea received the Joseph Priestley award.

== Early life and education ==
Born and raised in Clifton, New Jersey, Alyea was one of 28 graduates from the Clifton High School class of 1920. He attended Princeton University, ultimately earning a Ph.D. in chemistry.

== Career at Princeton ==
The New York Times described his Princeton lectures as follows:

Dr. Alyea had a genius for bringing science to life in the classroom. With his 'armchair chemistry', he endowed chemical principles with the drama and verve of a sound-and-light show, which now and then burned his suits beyond repair. His hands flew above test tubes and Bunsen burners. Amid explosions and swishing clouds of carbon dioxide he explained the mysteries of chemistry with contagious enthusiasm.

=== Public lectures ===
According to Time magazine, he "lectured with an animated, dynamic style that drew enthusiastic audiences of all ages".

Life magazine reported "Grimacing with fiendish delight ... he sets off explosions, shoots water pistols and sprays his audience with carbon dioxide in the course of 32 harrowing experiments dramatizing complicated theory". A shortened version of the lecture was featured on a 1955 NBC TV series Princeton '55: An Exploration into Education through Television; it won an Emmy.

"Lucky Accidents, Great Discoveries, and the Prepared Mind" was a lecture he gave frequently about the nature of scientific discovery.

== Retirement ==
After his retirement, Alyea continued to deliver lectures at Princeton reunions. His memoir, My Life as a Chemist, was published in 1991.

Alyea died in his sleep at his home in Hightstown, New Jersey, on October 22, 1996, at the age of 93.

== Awards ==
1. New Jersey Science Teachers Award (1954)
2. New Jersey Education Citation (1957)
3. Chemical Manufacturers Association Award (1964)
4. Award from the New Jersey Chapter of the American Institute of Chemists (1966)
5. Award in Chemical Education from the American Chemical Society (1970)
6. James Flack Norris Award from the Northeast Section of the American Chemical Society (1970)
7. Robert H. Carleton Award from the National Science Teachers Association (1991)
8. Joseph Priestley Award (1984)
