= Gloria Struck =

American long-distance motorcycle rider

Gloria Tramontin Struck
- Born: July 7, 1925 (age 101); Clifton, New Jersey, U.S.
- Known for: Motorcycling

Gloria Tramontin Struck (born July 7, 1925) is an American motorcyclist who was one of the early members of the Motor Maids women's motorcycle club, which she joined in 1946, at age 21. She is both a Sturgis Hall of Fame and Motorcycle Hall of Fame inductee.

Struck was born in a room behind her parents' Clifton, New Jersey motorcycle shop in 1925. She has ridden motorcycles since age 16, and has engaged in several long-distance motorcycling journeys through all 48 of the contiguous U.S. states. Her first solo motorcycle tour, in Canada in 1950, was the subject of a feature story in a 1952 issue of Harley-Davidson Enthusiast. She has frequently ridden to distant rallies for Motor Maids and the national Sturgis Motorcycle Rally into her late 80s, for which she spurns trailering. She estimates a lifetime 650,000 miles (1,050,000 km) riding on eleven Harley-Davidsons and three Indian Motorcycles she has owned, and went on motorcycle tours in Europe starting in her 70s. For her 90th birthday in 2015, she rode over 1,700 miles (2,700 km) from New Jersey to a Motor Maids rally in New Brunswick and back.

Struck was named to the Sturgis Hall of Fame in 2011, and to the AMA Motorcycle Hall of Fame in 2016.

== Bibliography ==
- Struck, Gloria (2017). Gloria - A Lifetime Motorcyclist: 75 Years on Two Wheels and Still Riding. Wolfgang Publications. ISBN 978-1941064023.
- Winterhalder, Edward; De Clercq, Wil (2010). Biker Chicz Of North America. Blockhead City. ISBN 978-0977174737.
