= Ernest Mario School of Pharmacy =

Pharmacy school of Rutgers University

Coordinates: 40.52293°N 74.46743°W

Rutgers - Ernest Mario School of Pharmacy
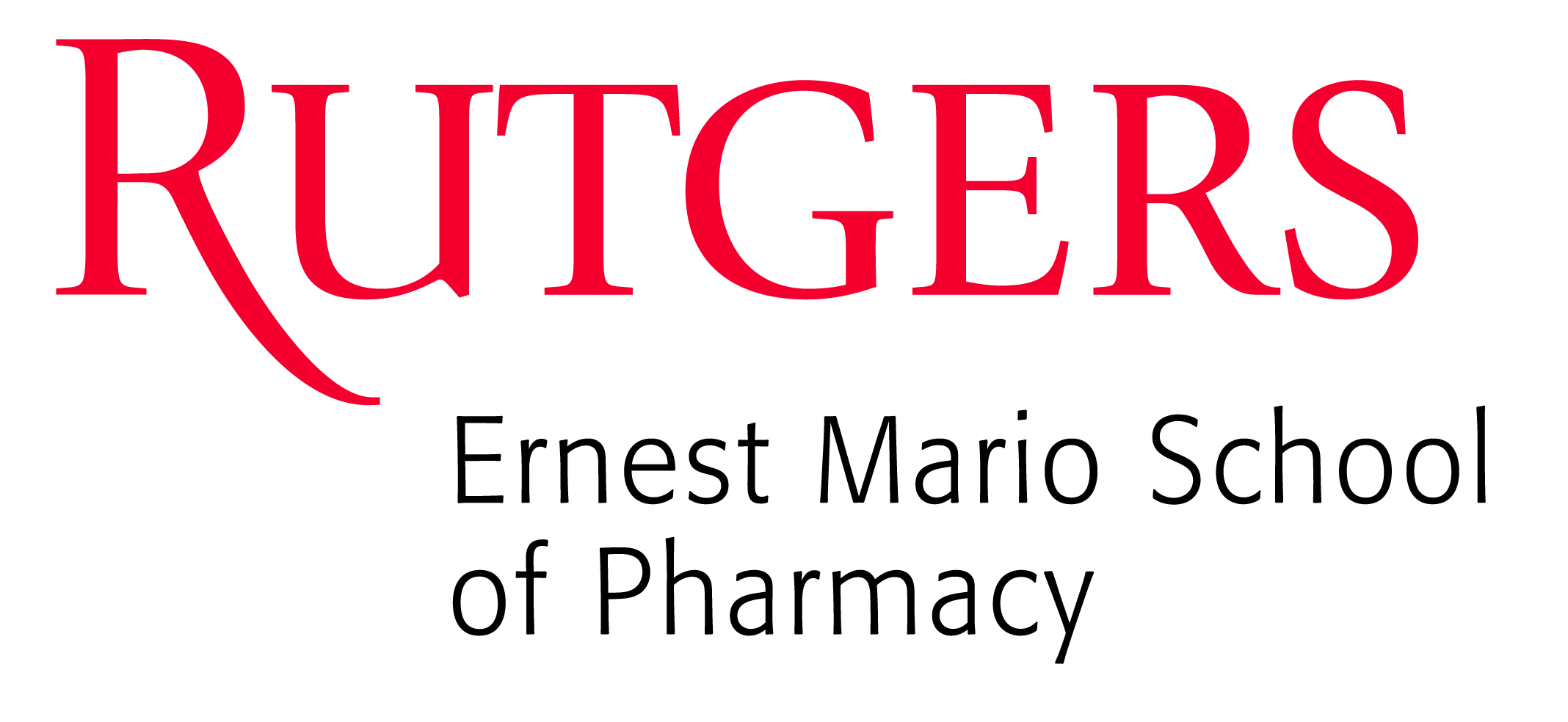
- Motto: Sol iustitiae et occidentem illustra
- Type: Public
- Established: 1892
- Dean: Joseph A. Barone
- Students: 1300
- Postgraduates: 70
- Location: Piscataway, New Jersey, U.S.
- Website: pharmacy.rutgers.edu

The Ernest Mario School of Pharmacy (EMSOP) is the pharmacy school of Rutgers University. It was founded in 1892 as the Newark College of Pharmacy and merged with Rutgers University in 1927 as the Rutgers College of Pharmacy. In 1971, the school moved to its current location in Piscataway, on the Busch Campus. In 2003, the school was renamed the Ernest Mario School of Pharmacy in recognition of Ernest Mario's contributions to the pharmaceutical industry and the school. As of 2015 it was tied as the 26th ranked pharmacy school in the US.

== See also ==
- List of pharmacy schools
