= Russ Carroccio =

American football player (1931–1994)

No. 65, 64
- Position: Offensive lineman

Personal information
- Born: April 28, 1931; Passaic, New Jersey
- Died: June 28, 1994 (aged 63)

Career information
- College: Virginia

Career history
- 1954–1955: New York Giants
- 1955: Philadelphia Eagles
- Stats at Pro Football Reference

Russell B. Carroccio (April 28, 1931 – June 28, 1994) was an American football offensive lineman in the National Football League for the New York Giants and the Philadelphia Eagles. He played college football at the University of Virginia.

Born and raised in Clifton, New Jersey, Carroccio attended Clifton High School.
