= Garritse–Doremus–Westervelt House =

- U.S. National Register of Historic Places
- New Jersey Register of Historic Places
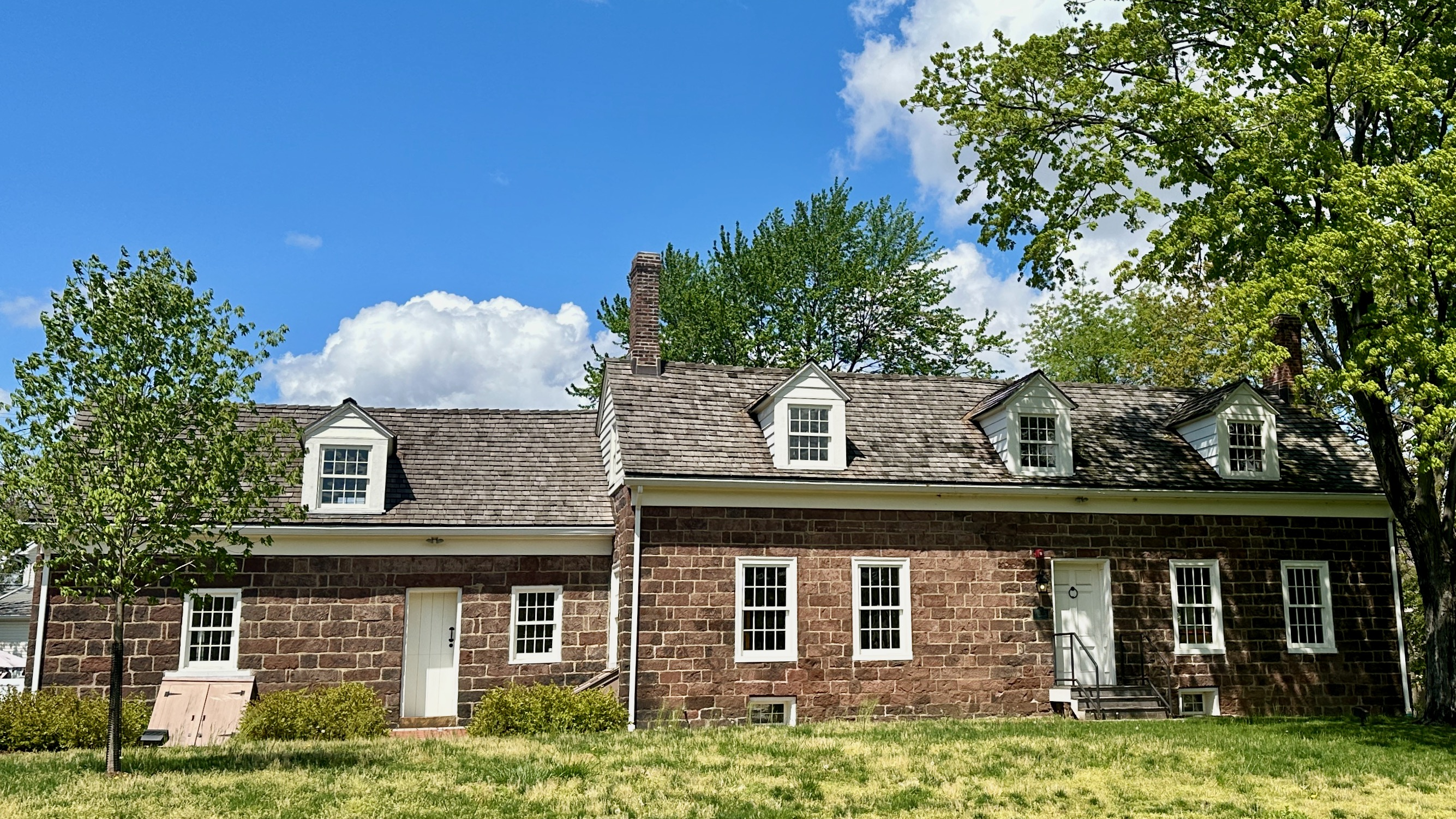

- Location within Passaic County, New Jersey Location within New Jersey Location within the United States
- Location: 794 Park Drive, Weasel Brook Park, Clifton, New Jersey
- Coordinates: 40°52′15.5″N 74°8′48″W
- Built: c. 1785
- Built by: Peter Garritse, David Westervelt
- Architectural style: Dutch Colonial
- NRHP reference No.: 100008730
- NJRHP No.: 5721

Significant dates
- Added to NRHP: March 20, 2023
- Designated NJRHP: January 13, 2023

The Garritse–Doremus–Westervelt House, also known as the Vanderhoef–Westervelt House, is a historic Dutch Colonial stone farmhouse located at 794 Park Drive in Weasel Brook Park in the city of Clifton in Passaic County, New Jersey, United States. It was documented by the Historic American Buildings Survey (HABS) in 1939 and was added to the National Register of Historic Places on March 20, 2023, for its significance in architecture. The c. 1785 house is one of the oldest in the county.

== History and description ==
Gilbert Vanderhoef received the property as a gift from his father-in-law John E. Vreeland c. 1720 and subsequently built a farmhouse and gristmill, powered by the Weasel Brook. Garret Garritse purchased the property in 1736. After his death in 1737, the farm passed to his son Peter Garritse. He and his wife Jane, built the northeastern part of the house c. 1785. They sold the property to Ralph Doremus in 1805. He sold it to Sophia Westervelt in 1825. She and her husband David added the southwestern part of the house and attached kitchen wing c. 1830. Their son Richard Westervelt inherited the property in 1875. Edward Jewett bought the property in 1905 as an investment. The Passaic County Park Commission purchased the property in 1931.

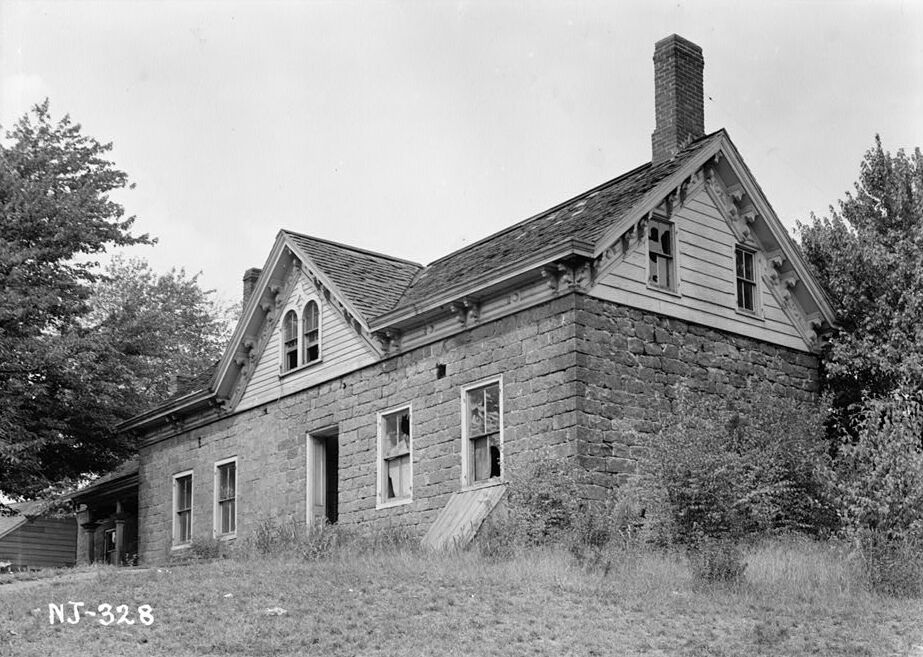
HABS photo from 1939

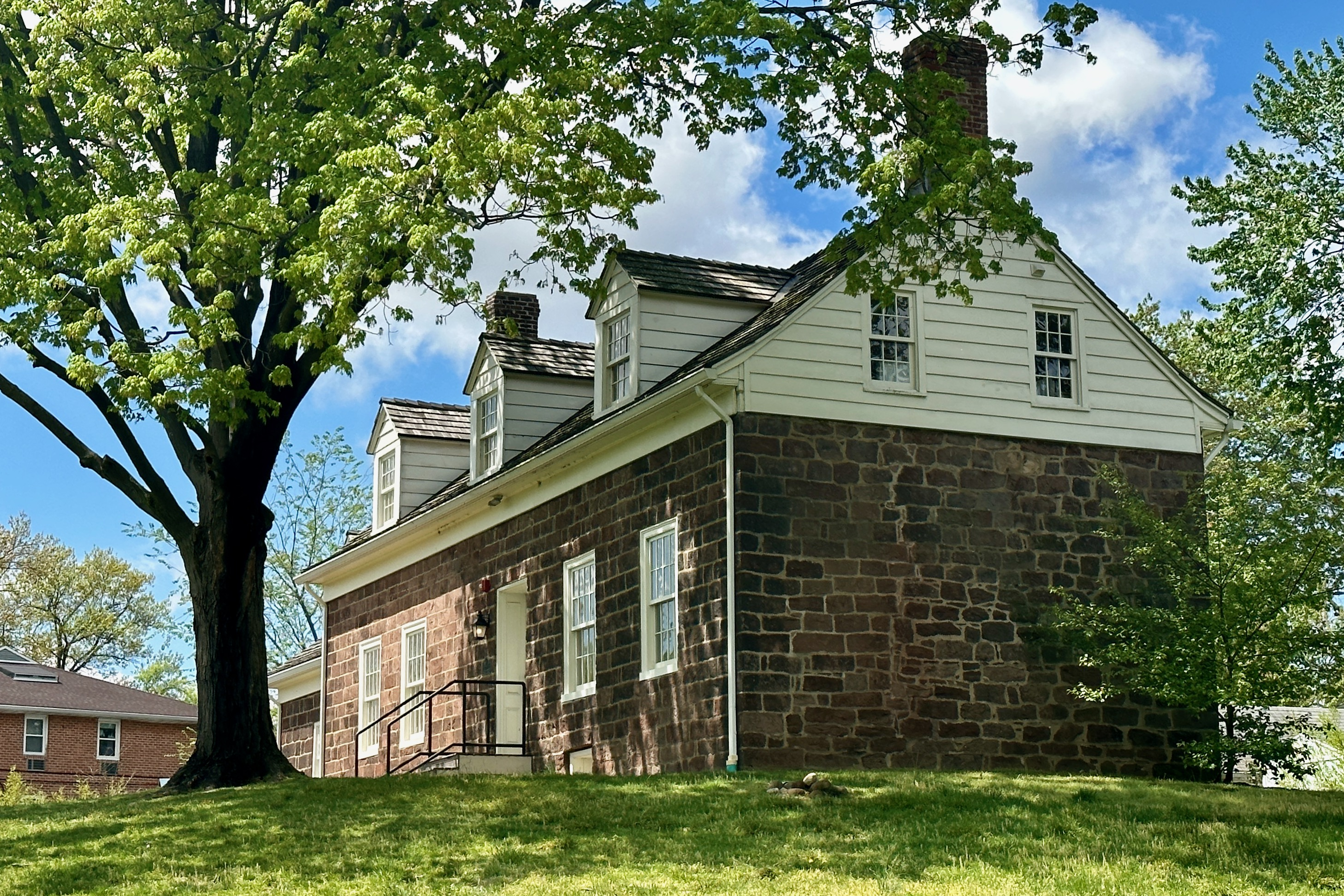
View in 2023

== See also ==
- National Register of Historic Places listings in Passaic County, New Jersey
- List of the oldest buildings in New Jersey
