= Kayla Meneghin =

American ice hockey player

- Born: December 22, 1994 (age 30); Clifton, New Jersey, United States
- Height: 5 ft 4 in (163 cm)
- Position: Forward
- Shoots: Right
- PHF team Former teams: Buffalo Beauts; Connecticut Whale; Plattsburgh Cardinals
- Playing career: 2014–present

Kayla Meneghin (born December 22, 1994) is an American ice hockey forward, currently playing with the Buffalo Beauts of the Premier Hockey Federation (PHF).

== Career ==
As a child, Meneghin began playing hockey for the Quarry Cats based in Montclair State University Ice Arena, before playing for the New Jersey Colonials in high school. Raised in Clifton, New Jersey, Meneghin played prep hockey at Clifton High School before transferring to The Gunnery for her last two years of high school.

From 2014 to 2018, she attended Plattsburgh State, scoring 188 points across 117 NCAA Division III games, the fifth highest scorer in league history and second highest scorer in Plattsburgh program history. During her four seasons with the university, she won three national championships.

After graduating, she attended the PHF's Buffalo Beauts free agent camp before signing her first professional contract with the Connecticut Whale as an undrafted free agent. She scored one goal in ten games in her rookie season for the Whale. Her production jumped in her second season, scoring 8 points in 14 games and picking up time on the team's first line.

She left Connecticut to sign with the Beauts for the 2020–21 NWHL season.

== Personal life ==
Since 2018, Meneghin has served as an assistant coach for the women's hockey programme at Saint Anselm College. In 2020, she co-founded a business called KayRad Hockey with Jersey Hitmen head coach Darius Radziszewski.
