= Clifton High School (New Jersey) =

High school in Passaic County, New Jersey, US

Location
- 333 Colfax Avenue; Clifton, Passaic County, New Jersey 07013; United States; 40.871253°N 74.163167°W

Information
- Type: Public High School
- Established: 1906
- School district: Clifton Public Schools
- CEEB code: 310245
- NCES School ID: 340330004762
- Principal: Ahmad Hamdeh
- Faculty: 224.8 FTEs
- Grades: 9-12
- Enrollment: 3,150 (as of 2024–25)
- Student to teacher ratio: 14.0:1
- Colors: Maroon and Gray
- Athletics: Big North Conference (general); North Jersey Super Football Conference (football)
- Mascot: Clifton Mustang
- Team name: Mustangs
- Rival: Passaic High School
- Website: www.clifton.k12.nj.us/clifton-high-school

Clifton High School (CHS) is a four-year comprehensive public high school serving students in ninth through twelfth grades from the city of Clifton in Passaic County, in the U.S. state of New Jersey, operating as part of the Clifton Public Schools. It has the largest student body in a single facility amongst high schools in New Jersey; Elizabeth High School had more students, but its students have been spread over multiple campuses.

As of the 2024–25 school year, the school had an enrollment of 3,150 students and 224.8 classroom teachers (on an FTE basis), for a student–teacher ratio of 14.0:1. There were 1,726 students (54.8% of enrollment) eligible for free lunch and 380 (12.1% of students) eligible for reduced-cost lunch. Based on 2021-22 data from the New Jersey Department of Education, it was the third-largest high school in the state and one of 29 schools with more than 2,000 students.

== History ==
The district established a high school in 1906, with 40 students, with a curriculum that covered "English, Latin, Greek, German, history, mathematics, physics, chemistry, bookkeeping, shorthand, typewriting." By 1914, the school had 150 students. A new building was dedicated in April 1926, by which time the school served an enrollment of 1,100.

The current high school building on Colfax Avenue was completed at a cost of $6 million (equivalent to $66 million in 2025) and opened in September 1962 with 3,000 students.

An additional overflow site, the Clifton High School Annex, was constructed at a cost of $17 million and opened in September 2009 to accommodate 540 of the school year's 850 incoming freshmen to alleviate overcrowding.

== Awards, recognition and rankings ==
The school was the 239th-ranked public high school in New Jersey out of 339 schools statewide in New Jersey Monthly magazine's September 2014 cover story on the state's "Top Public High Schools", using a new ranking methodology. The school had been ranked 274th in the state of 328 schools in 2012, after being ranked 259th in 2010 out of 322 schools listed. The magazine ranked the school 223rd in 2008 out of 316 schools. The school was ranked 280th in the magazine's September 2006 issue, which surveyed 316 schools across the state.

== Campus ==
Clifton High School is divided into four wings; North, Central, South and East. Between the South and East wings, the William F. Shershin Memorial Technology and Media Center provides students access to many books, music, movies and computers with internet access.

Due to overcrowding, a walkway that runs alongside the four wings was added. There is also an annex building which now contains ASPIRE students. Originally, it had both freshmen students and ASPIRE students in the building. This annex building is located on Brighton Road.

== Activities ==
=== Athletics ===
The Clifton High School Mustangs compete in over 50 sport programs as part of the Big North Conference, which is comprised of public and private high schools in Bergen and Passaic counties, and was established following a reorganization of sports leagues in Northern New Jersey by the New Jersey State Interscholastic Athletic Association (NJSIAA). For the 2009–10 season, the school competed in the North Jersey Tri-County Conference, an interim conference established to facilitate realignment. Prior to the reorganization, the school had participated in the Northern New Jersey Interscholastic League (NNJIL) an athletic conference of high schools in Bergen and Passaic counties. With 2,131 students in grades 10–12, the school was classified by the NJSIAA for the 2019–20 school year as Group IV for most athletic competition purposes, which included schools with an enrollment of 1,060 to 5,049 students in that grade range. The football team competes in the Liberty Blue division of the North Jersey Super Football Conference, which includes 112 schools competing in 20 divisions, making it the nation's biggest football-only high school sports league. The school was classified by the NJSIAA as Group V North for football for 2024–2026, which included schools with 1,317 to 5,409 students.

Interscholastic athletics offered at the school include:

- Fall sports include boys' and girls' cross country, girls' gymnastics, football, girls' Volleyball, girls' tennis, boys' and girls' soccer, and marching band.
- Winter sports include hockey, boys' and girls' indoor track, wrestling, basketball, swimming, and bowling.
- Spring sports include baseball, boys' volleyball, boys' and girls' outdoor track, boys' and girls' lacrosse, boys' tennis, softball, and golf.

The boys' baseball team won the North I Group IV state sectional championships in 1960 and 1961.

The boys soccer team won the Group IV state championship in 1967 (defeating East Brunswick High School in the tournament final), 1994 (vs. Cherry Hill High School West), 2007 (as co-champion with Manalapan High School) and 2019 (vs. Hunterdon Central Regional High School). The 1967 team won the Group IV state title, defeating East Brunswick by a score of 4–1 in the championship game played at Fairleigh Dickinson University's campus in Madison. The 2007 boys' soccer team, under the direction of Coach Joe Vespignani, won the North I, Group IV state sectional championship with a 1–0 win over defending Group IV state champion West Orange High School in the tournament final. In the state semi-final, Clifton defeated Columbia High School by an identical 1–0 score. The spectacular goal was scored by Manuel Caicedo with a brilliant Bicycle Kick from the penalty spot. Manny Caicedo was named Passaic County Player of the Year and Second Team All State. The team moved on to share the Group IV state championship with a 1–1 tie against Manalapan High School. The 2008 boys' soccer team repeated as the North I, Group IV state sectional champion with a 3–2 overtime win against North Bergen High School. In the state semi-final, Clifton defeated Elizabeth High School 2–1 in overtime in a match-up of the two largest high schools in the state, before falling in the state final to Rancocas Valley Regional High School by a score of 2–0. The 2009 boys' soccer team completed a threepeat as the North I, Group IV state sectional champion with a 3–0 win over Livingston High School. In the state semi-final, Clifton defeated Ridge High School 1–0 in double overtime, before falling in the state final to Toms River High School South by a score of 1–0, a goal was the only goal allowed through the five games of the state tournament, in a season in which Clifton had a record of 19–6–1, including 16 shutouts. The team averaged 20 wins a season over the three-year period. In Coach Vespignani's eight years at the helm, the team is a combined 149–36–7. The Clifton boys' soccer team won the Passaic County Championship for nine consecutive years, from 1997 to 2005, before their streak was ended by Wayne Valley, which had lost to Clifton in the tournament finals in both 2004 and 2005 before defeating Clifton in both 2006 and 2007. The 2019 finished the season with a 20–0–1 record after defeating Hunterdon Central on penalty kicks in the Group IV final after a scoreless tie in regulation and overtime.

The boys' bowling team won the state championships in 1970, 1980, 2000 and 2002. The program's four state team titles are tied for third-most of all high schools in the state.

The boys' wrestling team won the North I Group IV state sectional title in 1984, 1986 and 2014, and won the North I Group V title in 2016.

The girls cross country team won the Group IV state championship in 1985.

The boys' cross country team won the NNJIL for eight years in a row (1998–2006) and the girls' team won for three years (2004–2007).

The softball team won the Group IV state championship in 1993 (defeating Washington Township High School in the final game of the playoffs), 1997 (vs. Middletown High School South), 1998 (vs. Cherokee High School) and 2007 (vs. Toms River High School East). The 1993 team finished the season with a 24–7 record after winning the Group IV title with a 7–1 win against Washington Township in the championship game played at Trenton State College. In 1997, the team finished with a 31–0 record after winning the Group IV title by defeating Middletown South by a score of 3–2 in the finals. The 1998 team had a 31–0 record and stretched its winning streak to 63 by winning the Group IV title with an 8–0 win against Cherokee in the championship game. The 2007 team won the North I, Group IV sectional championship with a 10–0 win over top-seeded Bloomfield High School. The team moved on to win the Group IV state championship defeating North Hunterdon High School in the semifinals and then Toms River High School East in the final game of the playoffs, both by a score of 2–0. NJ.com / The Star-Ledger ranked Clifton as their number-one softball team in the state in 1997 and 1998.

The ice hockey team won the public school state championship in 2001, and won the Handchen Cup in 1989, 1990 and 1995.

The Mustangs won the North I, Group IV football state sectional title in 2006, defeating Eastside High School in the championship game by a score of 26–0 in a game played with 8,000 spectators at Giants Stadium. The school has maintained a rivalry with Passaic High School, which was listed by The Record as one of the best in Bergen and Passaic counties; though the schools first faced each other before then, from 1950 through the 2017 season, Clifton is ahead with a 39–20–2 record in games between the two schools.

The girls' soccer team at Clifton, under Coach Dan Chilowicz, shared the Passaic County Championship title with Wayne Valley High School in 2007 with a deadlocked score of 0–0. The girls' team, led by Stan Lembryk, was declared county co-champion again in 2009 after a 1–1 tie with Wayne Hills High School.

The boys cross country team won the Group IV, public state sectional in the 2021–2022 season.

=== Clubs ===
Clifton High School has over 60 clubs. In its auditoriums, many plays and dance performances are held, many occurring annually. The Chemistry II "Dream Team" members came in second out of 127 schools in the state science competition in 2011.

=== Band ===
The Clifton High School Mustang Marching Band, "The Showband of the Northeast", is modeled after the fast-paced, high-stepping, Big-10 bands. It was under the leadership of band director Robert D. Morgan from 1972 through 2013–14. The band has been under the direction of Bryan Stepneski, a Clifton Mustang Band alumnus. The group forms the letters "C-H-S", similar to the script "O-H-I-O" of The Ohio State University Marching Band. The marching band unravels from a tight block, following one another, forming the school's initials in cursive. The band is showcased in many venues within the city of Clifton. It appears annually in the North Jersey Band Festival, (formally known as the Clifton Band Festival, or Herald News Band Festival) the West Milford Military Tattoo, all Clifton High School football games, and city parades. The Clifton High School Mustang Band has traveled extensively across the United States, the United Kingdom, Europe, and Canada. The Clifton High School Mustang Marching Band won first place in "Best in Parade" during the 2007 and 2008 Columbus Day Parade in New York City, second place in the 2009 Columbus Day Parade, and first place again in 2010. They won first place in the Columbus Day Parade in 2014. In 2016, the band won second place in the Columbus Day Parade once again. Among the other activities in Clifton High School, the city of Clifton placed the marching band on its list of the most recognized activities in the city of Clifton. The Mustang Band also has an active Alumni Association which has given out over $50,000 in scholarships to graduating band members since its founding in 2002.

=== Robotics ===
The Clifton High School "Mechanical Mustangs", team 3314 are a robotics team in the FIRST Robotics Competition, FIRST Mid Atlantic District. The team won their first competition at the Bridgewater-Raritan FIRST Robotics District Competition 2013 and their second competition at the Buckeye Regional.

=== Marine Corps Junior ROTC ===
The school is one of five in the state to participate in the Marine Corps Junior Reserve Officers' Training Corps (JROTC) program.

== Administration ==
The school's principal is Ahmad Hamdeh. Core members of the school's administration include the five vice principals.

== Notable alumni ==
- Hubert Alyea (1903–1996, class of 1920), professor of chemistry at Princeton University, whose explosive chemistry demonstrations inspired the title character in the 1961 film The Absent-Minded Professor
- Greg Bajek (born 1968), retired soccer player, coach and team owner who played professionally in the American Professional Soccer League and owned a franchise in the USL Premier Development League
- Sofia Black-D'Elia (born 1991), actress who has appeared as Tea Marvelli in Skins, Sage Spence in Gossip Girl and Andrea Cornish in The Night Of
- Bennie Borgmann (1898–1978, class of 1917), professional baseball and basketball player and coach who was inducted into the Naismith Memorial Basketball Hall of Fame
- Jonathan Borrajo (born 1987), professional soccer player, who has played for Miami F.C. in the NASL
- John J. Cali (1918–2014), real estate developer
- Russ Carroccio (1931–1994), American football offensive lineman who played in the NFL for the New York Giants and the Philadelphia Eagles
- Dan Garrett, head football coach at Kean University
- Gary Geld (1935–2015), composer known for his work creating musicals and popular songs with his lyricist partner Peter Udell
- Bob Holly (born 1960), former American football quarterback in the NFL for the Washington Redskins, Philadelphia Eagles and Atlanta Falcons
- Jay Horwitz (born 1945, class of 1963), former media relations director for the New York Mets
- Karin Korb (born 1967), retired wheelchair tennis player who twice competed at the Summer Paralympics
- Wojtek Krakowiak (born 1976), football (soccer) midfielder who was the head coach of the Montana State University Billings women's soccer team after playing professionally in Major League Soccer
- Stan Lembryk (born 1969), retired professional soccer player
- Sue Macy (born 1954), author, whose 2019 book, The Book Rescuer, won the Sydney Taylor Book Award from the Association of Jewish Libraries
- Ray Malavasi (1930–1987), football coach who was head coach of the Denver Broncos and Los Angeles Rams
- Ernest Mario (1938–2024), pharmaceutical executive
- Lloyd B. Marsh (1893–1971), politician who served as Secretary of State of New Jersey and Chairman of the New Jersey Republican State Committee
- Ronald F. Maxwell (born 1949), director and producer of several movies, including the 2003 Civil War film Gods and Generals
- Kayla Meneghin (born 1994) ice hockey forward for the Buffalo Beauts of the National Women's Hockey League
- Larry Mialik (born 1950), tight end who played for the Atlanta Falcons and San Diego Chargers
- Matt Miazga (born 1995), professional soccer player who played for the New York Red Bulls
- Geri Miller (born 1942, class of 1960), former go-go dancer and actress
- Newton Edward Miller (1919–2012), politician who served in the New Jersey General Assembly, where he represented the 34th Legislative District
- Chris Opperman (born 1978, class of 1996), composer
- Nikki Phillips (born 1987), soccer defender and midfielder who plays with FC Kansas City in the National Women's Soccer League
- Giuseppe Rossi (born 1987), American-born Italian soccer player, who has played for ACF Fiorentina
- Ed Sanicki (1923–1998), outfielder for the Philadelphia Phillies who hit a home run in his first at-bat in the Major Leagues
- Jon Seda (born 1970), actor best known for his role as Detective Paul Falsone on NBC's Homicide: Life on the Street
- James P. Shenton (1925–2003, class of 1942), historian of nineteenth-and twentieth-century America and professor at Columbia University
- Dave Szott (born 1967), offensive lineman who played for the New York Jets
- Dave White (born 1979), Derringer Award-winning mystery writer
- Ivan Wilzig (born 1956), techno mix musician known as Peaceman
