= Jay Horwitz =

American sports director (born 1945)

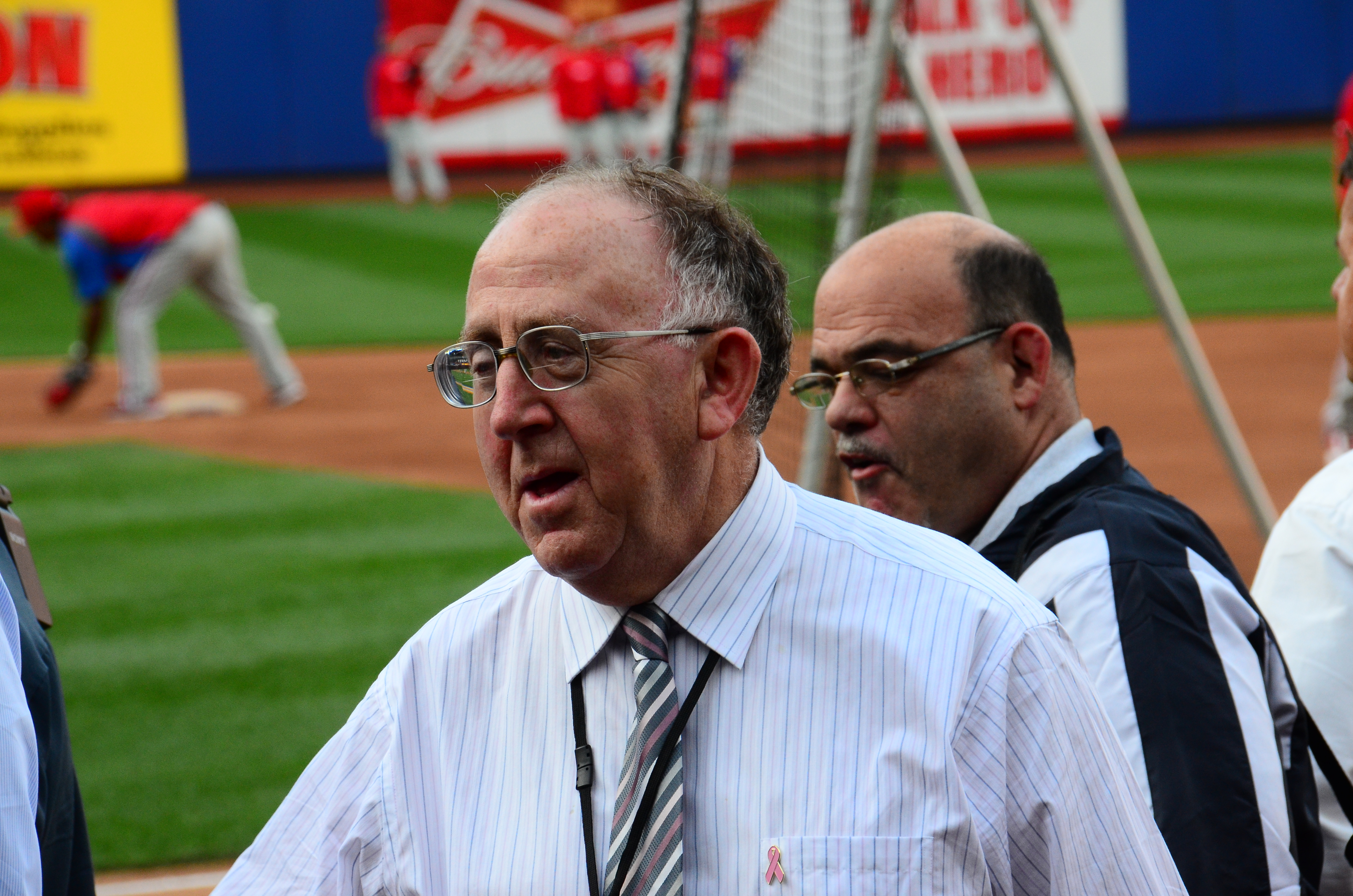
- Horwitz at Citi Field in 2012
- Born: August 14, 1945 (age 81); The Bronx, New York, U.S.
- Education: New York University
- Occupations: Sportswriter, sports information director, media relations director
- Years active: 1969–present
- Employer: New York Mets

Jay Edward Horwitz (born August 14, 1945) is an American professional baseball executive for the New York Mets of Major League Baseball. He was their media relations director for nearly four decades, and is the team's current historian and vice president of alumni relations. He was formerly a sportswriter, and a sports information director for New York University and Fairleigh Dickinson University.

== Early years and personal life ==
Horwitz was born on V-J Day (Victory over Japan Day) in 1945 in the Fordham Road section of the Bronx in New York City, and is Jewish. His father Milton Horwitz was a general manager for a coat factory, and his mother Gertrude was a homemaker and subsequently a stenographer and a bookkeeper; both of his parents were children of Russian Jewish immigrants.

When his mother was pregnant with him, she contracted rubella. Horwitz was as a result born with glaucoma, and consequently was blind in his right eye, which was a different color than his left eye. When he was in the sixth grade, an eye doctor advised him that if he did not have his bad eye taken out, the glaucoma could spread to his good eye, so he had an artificial eye put in. Out of embarrassment he never revealed until 2020 that he had one glass eye, but said in an interview "anybody who looked at me knew I wasn't perfect".

As a child Horwitz played second base for a Little League team sponsored by "Epstein's Dept. Store". He had his bar mitzvah in September 1958 at the Clifton Jewish Center. His hometown is Clifton, New Jersey, to which he moved at six years of age, and where he still lives in the small house in which he grew up.

Horwitz attended Clifton High School, graduating in 1963. There, he was a student manager of the school's varsity baseball, basketball, track and field, and cross country teams. He graduated from New York University (NYU), with a journalism degree (Steinhardt '67). Horwitz also obtained a master's degree in political science from NYU's Graduate School of Arts & Science, which he earned in 1969.

In June 2023, when baseball player Spencer Horwitz was promoted to the major leagues by the Toronto Blue Jays, Jay Horwitz tweeted a photo of the two of them together, and jokingly captioned it "Congrats to my grandson Spencer Horwitz on his promotion to the Blue Jays. A proud grandpa Jay.", although they are not related. Spencer said:

Jay was our public relations guy for Team Israel during the WBC ... And it just kind of blew up. A lot of people still come up to me and say, 'Hey, I know your grandfather really well.' Then everyone is a little disappointed when I tell them that (it's not true). Jay's a great guy and just knowing him during that brief stint that I did was awesome.

== Sports information director, and sportswriter ==
Horwitz worked as a sports information director at New York University from late 1969 to 1972.

He was also a sportswriter for the Herald News of Passaic, New Jersey, where Horwitz covered high school sports and the New York Jets for three years, beginning in the fall of 1969.

Horwitz was Fairleigh Dickinson University's sports information director from 1972 to 1980. In his first day on the job, working as the official scorer for a basketball game he entered two men's players names incorrectly for the officials, resulting in two technical fouls in an overtime one-point loss.

== New York Mets ==
Horwitz began working for the New York Mets on April 1, 1980, initially with the title of director of public relations. Horwitz was named the Mets vice president of media relations on February 7, 2001. His span of time with the Mets as the team's media relations director lasted until 2018.

After the Mets won the 1986 World Series, the team gave $4,000 bonuses to department heads, but the players took the unusual step of voting Horwitz a full share of $93,000 (equivalent to $273,000 today), which was the same amount that its players received. He was hesitant to accept it, though players insisted. He reached out to his mother, Gertrude, for advice; She said: "I didn't raise a schmuck. Take the 93." He did so.

In 2018, he became the team's historian and vice president of alumni relations. In 2019, the New York Chapter of the Baseball Writers' Association of America gave him the "William J. Slocum/Jack Lang Award for 'Long & Meritorious Service'".

In May 2020 Horwitz published his memoir, Mr. Met: How a Sports-Mad Kid From Jersey Became Like Family to Generations of Big Leaguers (Triumph Books), with a foreword by pitcher Jacob deGrom. Reviewing it, New York Times sports columnist George Vecsey wrote: "This sweet book shows the beating heart of a sport ..."

=== Honors ===
In 1998, Horwitz was awarded the Fishel Award for Public Relations Excellence in Major League Baseball. In 2006, he was given the Thurman Munson Award for dedication and excellence in media relations.

In 2022 the New York Mets named the Citi Field press box in honor of Horwitz. In 2023 he was honored with the New York Mets Hall of Fame Achievement Award.
