= Greg Bajek =

American soccer player, coach, and team owner (born 1968)

Personal information
- Full name: Gregory Bajek
- Date of birth: May 29, 1968 (age 58)
- Place of birth: Clifton, New Jersey, U.S.
- Height: 5 ft 10 in (1.78 m)
- Position: Midfielder

Youth career
- 1988–1990: Kean College

Senior career*
Years	Team	Apps	(Gls)
1991	Penn-Jersey Spirit	10	(1)
1992–1993	Stal Stalowa Wola	6	(1)
1994–1996	North Jersey Imperials		
1996–1998	Central Jersey Riptide		(16)
2000	New Brunswick Brigade	6	(3)
2002–2004	Jersey Falcons	30	(2)
2005	Western Mass Pioneers	10	(0)

Managerial career
- 2001, 2003–2004: Jersey Falcons
- * Club domestic league appearances and goals

Greg Bajek (born May 29, 1968) is an American retired soccer player, coach and team owner who played professionally in the American Professional Soccer League and owned a franchise in the USL Premier Development League.

Bajek grew up in Clifton, New Jersey and graduated from Clifton High School. He attended Kean College, playing on the men's soccer team from 1988 to 1990. He was a 1988 NCAA Division III First Team All American.

In July 1991, Bajek turned professional when he signed with the Penn-Jersey Spirit of the American Professional Soccer League. In 1992, he moved to Poland where he played for Stal Stalowa Wola. On March 3, 1994, Bajek signed with the North Jersey Imperials of the USISL. In 1995 and 1996, the Imperials played in the USISL Pro League. In 1996, Bajek joined the Central Jersey Riptide of the USISL Pro League. In 1998 and 1999, the team moved down to the USISL D-3 Pro League. In 2000, he played for the New Brunswick Brigade. In 2001, Bajek became the owner and coach of the Jersey Falcons. From 2002 to 2004, he played for the Falcons. In 2003, he again became the head coach. When the team collapsed in 2005, Bajek finished his career with the Western Mass Pioneers.
