= Jersey Falcons =

- Full name: Jersey Falcons
- Nickname: The Falcons
- Founded: 2001
- Dissolved: 2004
- Ground: New Jersey City University
- Manager: Greg Bajek
- League: USL Premier Development League
- 2004: 9th, Northeast Division

Jersey Falcons were an American soccer team, founded in 2001. The team was a member of the United Soccer Leagues Premier Development League (PDL), the fourth tier of the American Soccer Pyramid, until 2004, when the team left the league and the franchise was terminated.

They played their home games in the stadium at New Jersey City University in Jersey City, New Jersey. The team's colors were red and white, representing their strong links to the local Polish community in the area.

== Year-by-year ==
Year	Division	League	Regular season	Playoffs	Open Cup
2001	4	USL PDL	8th, Northeast	Did not qualify	Did not qualify
2002	4	USL PDL	6th, Northeast	Did not qualify	Did not qualify
2003	4	USL PDL	8th, Northeast	Did not qualify	Did not qualify
2004	4	USL PDL	9th, Northeast	Did not qualify	Did not qualify

== Coaches ==
- (United States) Greg Bajek 2003–04

== Stadia ==
- Ted Cooper Field, Linden, New Jersey 2003 (4 games)
- Rexplex Complex, Elizabeth, New Jersey 2003 (3 games)
- Stadium at Kean University, Union, New Jersey 2003 (1 game)
- Stadium at New Jersey City University, Jersey City, New Jersey 2004
