= John Westervelt House =

- U.S. National Register of Historic Places
- New Jersey Register of Historic Places
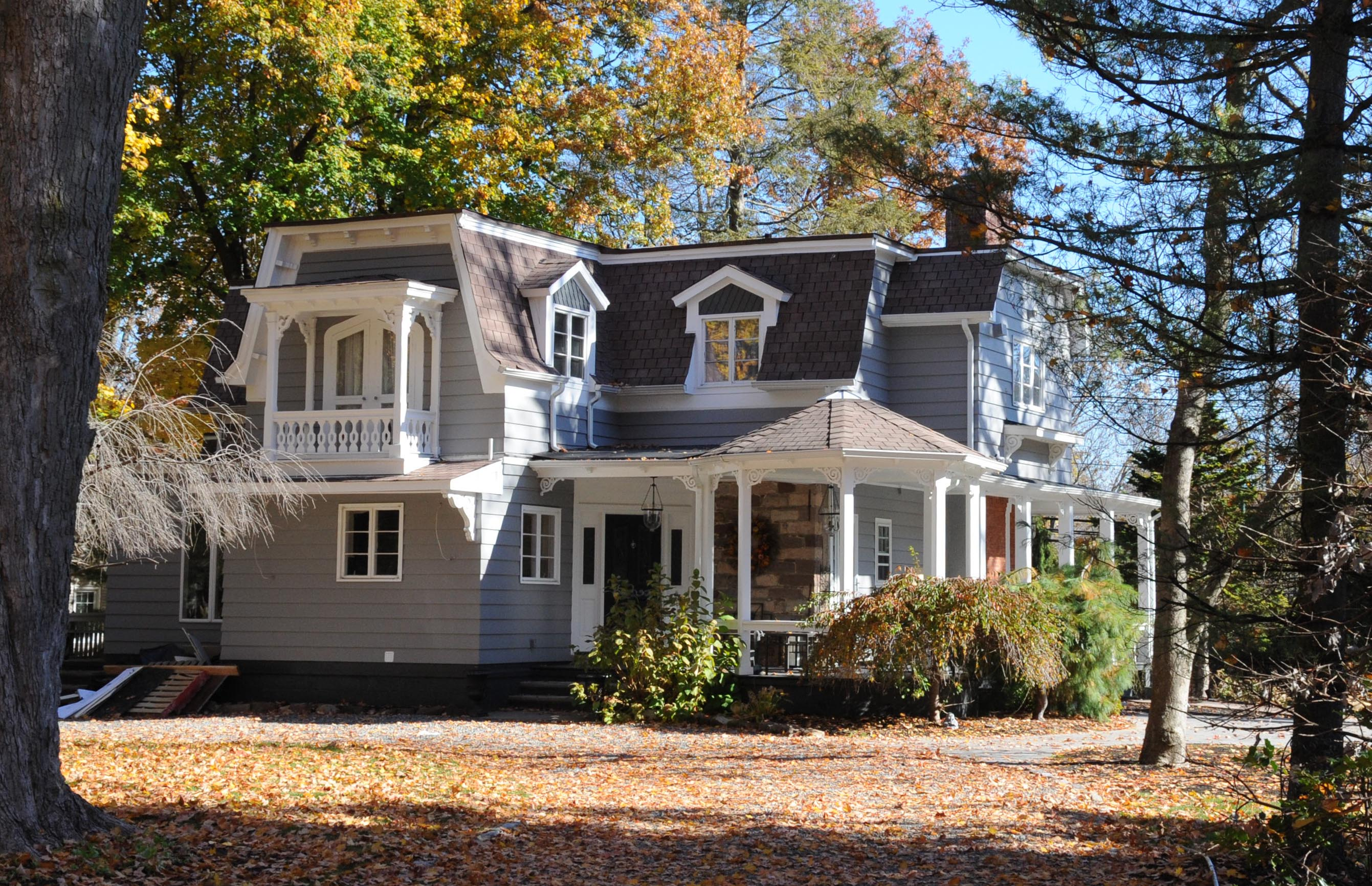

- Location within Bergen County, New Jersey Location within New Jersey Location within the United States
- Location: 29 The Parkway, Harrington Park, New Jersey
- Coordinates: 40°59′11″N 73°58′33″W
- MPS: Stone Houses of Bergen County TR
- NRHP reference No.: 83001585
- NJRHP No.: 528

Significant dates
- Added to NRHP: January 9, 1983
- Designated NJRHP: October 3, 1980

The John Westervelt House is located at 29 The Parkway in the borough of Harrington Park in Bergen County, New Jersey, United States. The historic stone house was added to the National Register of Historic Places on January 9, 1983, for its significance in architecture and exploration/settlement. It was listed as part of the Early Stone Houses of Bergen County Multiple Property Submission (MPS).

According to the nomination form, the house was built before the American Revolutionary War based on a map by Robert Erskine. In 1779, John Westervelt owned 240 acres (97 ha) here. The house features a Flemish bond brick facade and has been substantially expanded. It was owned by George Ward in 1876 and associated with P. T. Barnum.

== See also ==
- National Register of Historic Places listings in Bergen County, New Jersey
