= 2013 U.S. Open Cup qualification =

American soccer cup qualification competition

The 2013 Lamar Hunt U.S. Open Cup tournament proper features teams from all five tiers of men's soccer of the American soccer pyramid.

For the 2013 tournament, all American-based teams from the top two tiers, Major League Soccer and the North American Soccer League, will earns berths into the third and second round propers of the tournament, respectively.

For the third, fourth and fifth tiers of the pyramid, a series of qualification and state tournaments are held to determine the berths into the tournament. Most states began their qualification in October or November 2012 and will conclude in March 2013. These teams will complete the 64-team field in the U.S. Open Cup.

== League ==
=== National Premier Soccer League ===
In addition to the two teams from the West qualifying tournament, the following NPSL teams also qualified:

- Chattanooga FC, 2012 Southeast Division playoff champion
- FC Sonic Lehigh Valley, 2012 Keystone Division champion
- Georgia Revolution, 2012 Southeast Division playoff finalist
- Madison 56ers, 2012 Central Division champion
- New York Red Bulls U-23, 2012 Atlantic Division champion

The Erie Admirals, 2012 Great Lakes Division regular season champions, were expected to join but declined citing a variety of reasons. AFC Cleveland as the division's playoff champion was next in line but also declined. Rather than giving the Open Cup berth to the division's third choice, Detroit City FC, they awarded the berth to the club that had the best overall record among the remaining teams league wide (excluding Western Conference), which was the Brooklyn Italians.

==== NPSL Western Conference Northern Division qualifying tournament ====
All five teams of the 2013 Northern Division competed in the qualifying tournament with Real San Jose, San Francisco Stompers, and Sonoma County Sol receiving first round byes.

First Round - March 9
Sacramento Gold	3
CD Aguiluchos USA	0

Semifinals - March 16
Sacramento Gold	2
Real San Jose	0
San Francisco Stompers	2
Sonoma County Sol	5

Final - March 23
Sonoma County Sol	1
Sacramento Gold	5

==== Matches ====
March 9, 2013 Match 1	CD Aguiluchos USA	0–3	Sacramento Gold	Oakland, California

March 16, 2013 Match 2	Real San Jose	0–2	Sacramento Gold	San Jose, California

March 16, 2013 Match 3	Sonoma County Sol	5–2	San Francisco Stompers

March 23, 2013 Match 4	Sacramento Gold	5–1	Sonoma County Sol	West Sacramento, California
19:00 PDT UTC−7				Stadium: River City High School Stadium

==== NPSL Western Conference Southern Division qualifying tournament ====
All six teams of the 2013 Southern Division competed in the qualifying tournament with FC Santa Clarita and San Diego Flash receiving first round byes.

First Round - March 17
Orange County Spartans^{1}	2
San Diego Boca	0
FC Hasental
Las Vegas Stallions^{2}

Semifinals - March 23, 24
San Diego Flash	4
San Diego Boca	2
FC Santa Clarita	1
FC Hasental	2

Final - March 30
San Diego Flash	0
FC Hasental	2

1. Orange County Spartans forfeited due to improper player registration
2. Las Vegas Stallions forfeited due to improper player registration

==== Matches ====
March 17, 2013 Match 1	FC Hasental	v	Las Vegas Stallions
		Las Vegas Stallions forfeited due to improper player registration

March 17, 2013 Match 2	Orange County Spartans	2-0	San Diego Boca
		Orange County Spartans forfeited due to improper player registration

March 23, 2013 Match 3	FC Santa Clarita	1-2	FC Hasental	Santa Clarita, California
				Stadium: Canyon High School

March 24, 2013 Match 4	San Diego Flash	4-2	San Diego Boca	San Diego, California
17:00 PDT UTC−7				Stadium: Del Norte High School

March 30, 2013 Match 5	San Diego Flash	1-2	FC Hasental	San Diego, California
17:00 PDT UTC−7				Stadium: Del Norte High School

=== USASA ===
The top 2 finishers in each region will qualify directly to the U.S. Open Cup tournament proper.

==== Region I ====
- Massachusetts Premier Soccer
- (New Jersey) Icon FC

==== Region II ====
- (Illinois) RWB Adria
- (Michigan) Dearborn Stars

==== Region III ====
- (Florida) Red Force FC
- (Texas) NTX Rayados

==== Region IV ====
- (California) Doxa Italia
- (California) PSA Elite

=== US Club Soccer ===
The USCS qualifying tournament consists of 2 groups with the top two finishers moving on to a single elimination bracket, with the winner qualifying for the 2013 U.S. Open Cup play-in round.

==== Group A ====
Team	Pts	Pld	W	L	D	GF	GA	GD
San Ramon SC	9	3	3	0	0	11	0	+11
Capital FC	6	3	2	1	0	11	5	+6
North Coast Tsunami	3	3	1	2	0	3	7	-4
Southern Oregon Fuego	0	3	0	3	0	0	13	-13

March 16, 2013	Capital FC	0 - 3	San Ramon SC

March 16, 2013	North Coast Tsunami	1 - 0	Southern Oregon Fuego

March 23, 2013	Southern Oregon Fuego	0 - 5	San Ramon SC

March 24, 2013	Capital FC	4 - 2	North Coast Tsunami

March 29, 2013	San Ramon SC	3 - 0	North Coast Tsunami

March 30, 2013	Southern Oregon Fuego	0 - 7	Capital FC

==== Group B ====
Team	Pts	Pld	W	L	D	GF	GA	GD
Fresno Fuego Future	7	3	2	0	1	6	3	3
Los Gatos Storm	6	3	2	1	0	6	3	3
Stanislaus United	2	3	0	1	2	5	6	-1
Bullard United	1	3	0	2	1	2	7	-5

March 16, 2013	Fresno Fuego Future	1 - 0	Los Gatos Storm

March 17, 2013	Los Gatos Storm	3 - 2	Stanislaus United

March 22, 2013	Bullard United	0 - 3	Los Gatos Storm

March 24, 2013	Stanislaus United	2 - 2	Fresno Fuego Future

March 27, 2013	Fresno Fuego Future	3 - 1	Bullard United

March 30, 2013	Bullard United	1 - 1	Stanislaus United

==== Knock-Out Round ====
Semifinals
San Ramon SC	1/0 +
Los Gatos Storm	1/2 +
Capital FC	2
Fresno Fuego Future	10

Final
Los Gatos Storm	1
Fresno Fuego Future	5

+ The San Ramon SC/Los Gatos Storm semifinal was suspended 1–1 in extra time due to a power failure which caused the lights to go out at the stadium. The match was replayed on April 21.
