= Weasel Brook =

River in New Jersey, United States

Coordinates: 40.87752°N 74.16717°W

Weasel Brook is a tributary of the Passaic River in Passaic County, New Jersey, United States. The brook begins in Clifton, New Jersey's Albion section near Ravine Park, passes under several major roads before it reaches Weasel Brook Park, a Frederick Law Olmsted-designed park named for the brook, where it bisects the park.

The brook then goes underground for some time, emerging near Clifton Public School #17 in the Botany section of the city. It then goes underground again, emerging in Passaic, New Jersey where it finally empties into the Passaic near NJ-21.

== See also ==
- List of rivers of New Jersey
