= Dearborn Stars =

Football club based in Michigan

- Full name: Dearborn Stars Soccer Club
- Nickname: Stars
- Founded: 1982
- Ground: Madonna University Soccer Field; Livonia, Michigan
- Capacity: 100
- President: (Lebanon) Dr. Ned M. Fawaz
- Head Coach: (United States) Sam Piraine
- League: Michigan Premier Soccer League; USASA
- 2012: 3rd
- Website: http://www.dearbornstars.com/
| Home colors | Away colors |

The Dearborn Stars are an American soccer club based in Dearborn, Michigan that play in the Michigan Premier Soccer League, a United States Adult Soccer Association-affiliated (fifth division) league. The club is best known for qualifying for the first round of the 2013 Lamar Hunt U.S. Open Cup.

== History ==
=== 2013 Open Cup run ===
Dearborn achieved prominence by qualifying for the 2013 edition of the Lamar Hunt U.S. Open Cup, the oldest active soccer cup competition in the United States. Dearborn qualified for the tournament proper via the 2013 USASA Region II National Cup, which they reached by being the only club to enter the Michigan Open Cup qualifier. In the first round of the tournament proper, Dearborn defeated PDL powerhouse, Michigan Bucks 2–0 off of goals from Nik Djokic. The Stars lost to the Dayton Dutch Lions in the second round proper.

== Roster ==
As of May 15, 2013.

Note: Flags indicate national team as defined under FIFA eligibility rules; some limited exceptions apply. Players may hold more than one non-FIFA nationality.

| No. | Pos. | Nation | Player |
|---|---|---|---|
| 0 | GK | ITA | Vito Lonigro |
| 1 | GK | IRN | Kassem Bazzi |
| 2 | DF | USA | Michael Grba |
| 3 | DF | USA | Darrell Quinn |
| 4 | DF | USA | Zach Wilkes |
| 5 | DF | USA | Mike Haidar |
| 6 | DF | ALG | Hichem Touati |
| 7 | DF | TUR | Mo Kaba |
| 8 | MF | ENG | John Heslop |
| 9 | MF | USA | Nathan Hicklin |
| 10 | MF | USA | Miki Djeroslu |
| 11 | FW | SRB | Nik Djokic |
| 12 | MF | USA | Dillon Chapman |
| 13 | FW | THA | Cyrus Sadee |
| 14 | FW | EGY | Hamoody Saad |
| 15 | MF | USA | Joe Beshara |
| 16 | MF | SRB | Louie Djokic |
| 17 | MF | MAS | Haider Al-Zayadi |
| 18 | MF | JOR | Haroun Odeh |
| 19 | FW | USA | Jordan Berry |
| 20 | MF | USA | Sam Seppo |

| No. | Pos. | Nation | Player |
|---|---|---|---|
| 21 | MF | ALB | Ardit Dushkaj |
| 22 | MF | BRA | Thiago Harris |
| 23 | DF | USA | Ali Elhabhab |
| 24 | DF | MKD | Tico Dalipi |
| 25 | MF | USA | Ryan Messick |
| 26 | DF | USA | Daniel Vitu |
| 27 | DF | LBN | Hussien Seklawi |
| 28 | MF | MAR | Ahmad Jawad |
| 29 | MF | USA | Ali Rida |
| 30 | MF | USA | Bishoy Matta |
| 31 | DF | USA | Nick Lyscas |
| 32 | MF | USA | Pat Gates |
| 33 | FW | USA | Brad Lyons |
| 34 | DF | EGY | Bilal Hussien |
| 35 | MF | USA | Doug Rice |
| 36 | MF | USA | Kevin Robinson |
| 37 | DF | CAN | Cayle Lackten |
| 38 | FW | USA | Jeff Rutledge |
| 39 | MF | USA | Ali Anani |
| 40 | MF | UAE | Mo Al-Bawardi |
