= Clifton Public Schools =

Public school district in Passaic County, New Jersey, US

Address
- 745 Clifton Avenue Clifton, Passaic County, New Jersey, 07015; United States
- Coordinates: 40.865681°N 74.160278°W

District information
- Grades: PreK-12
- Superintendent: Danny A. Robertozzi
- Schools: 20

Students and staff
- Enrollment: 10,514 (as of 2020–21)
- Faculty: 870.5 FTEs
- Student–teacher ratio: 12.1:1

Other information
- District Factor Group: CD
- Website: clifton.k12.nj.us
Ind.	Per pupil	District spending	Rank (*)	K-12 average	%± vs. average
1A	Total Spending	$16,017	15	$18,891	−15.2%
1	Budgetary Cost	11,412	4	14,783	−22.8%
2	Classroom Instruction	7,270	5	8,763	−17.0%
6	Support Services	1,720	16	2,392	−28.1%
8	Administrative Cost	1,226	18	1,485	−17.4%
10	Operations & Maintenance	952	1	1,783	−46.6%
13	Extracurricular Activities	172	21	268	−35.8%
16	Median Teacher Salary	61,234	32	64,043
Data from NJDoE 2014 Taxpayers' Guide to Education Spending. *Of K-12 districts with more than 3,500 students. Lowest spending=1; Highest=103

The Clifton Public Schools is a comprehensive community public school district that serves students in pre-kindergarten through twelfth grade from Clifton, in Passaic County, in the U.S. state of New Jersey.

As of the 2020–21 school year, the district, comprising 18 schools, had an enrollment of 10,514 students and 870.5 classroom teachers (on an FTE basis), for a student–teacher ratio of 12.1:1.

The district is classified by the New Jersey Department of Education as being in District Factor Group "CD", the sixth-highest of eight groupings. District Factor Groups organize districts statewide to allow comparison by common socioeconomic characteristics of the local districts. From lowest socioeconomic status to highest, the categories are: A, B, CD, DE, FG, GH, I and J.

== History ==
The district established a high school in 1906, with 40 students, with a curriculum that covered "English, Latin, Greek, German, history, mathematics, physics, chemistry, bookkeeping, shorthand, [and] typewriting." By 1914, the school had 150 students. A new building was dedicated in April 1926, by which time the school served an enrollment of 1,100.

The current high school building on Colfax Avenue was completed at a cost of $6 million (equivalent to $66 million in 2025) and opened in September 1962 with 3,000 students.

An additional overflow site, the Clifton High School Annex, was constructed at a cost of $17 million (equivalent to $25.5 million in 2025) and opened in September 2009 to accommodate 540 of the school year's 850 incoming freshmen to alleviate overcrowding.

== Schools ==
Schools in the district (with 2020–21 enrollment data from the National Center for Education Statistics) are:

Preschool

- Clifton Early Learner Academy (377 students; in grades PreK)
  - Marissa Papamarkos, principal

Elementary schools

- School One (245; K-5)
  - Maria Romeo, principal
- School Two (385; K-5)
  - Jennifer Lucas, principal
- School Three (282; K-5)
  - Linette Park, principal
- School Four (141; K-5)
  - Ronnie Estrict, principal
- School Five (373; K-5)
  - Stephen Anderson, principal
- School Eight (169; PreK-5)
  - Wendy Munoz, principal
- School Nine (285; K-5)
  - Joelle Rosetti, principal
- School Eleven (415; K-5)
  - Dalia Shalaby, principal
- School Twelve (616; PreK-5)
  - Rosmunda Kenning, principal
- School Thirteen (447; K-5)
  - Rachel Capizzi, principal
- School Fourteen (356; K-5)
  - Jason Habedank, principal
- School Fifteen (310; PreK-5)
  - Luginda Batten-Walker, principal
- School Sixteen (195; K-5)
  - Joanna Juarbe, principal
- School Seventeen (476; PreK-5)
  - Laura Zargorski, principal

Middle schools

- Christopher Columbus Middle School (1,172; 6-8)
  - Vanessa Gaba, principal
- Woodrow Wilson Middle School (1,276; 6-8)
  - Andrew Jaeger, principal

High school

- Clifton High School (2,891; 9-12)
  - Ahmad Hamdeh, principal

With more than 3,300 students enrolled as of 2006, Clifton High School was the largest single-facility high school in New Jersey; Elizabeth High School had more students, but they were spread over multiple campuses before the school was split into separate academies.

== Administration ==
Core members of the district's administration are:

- Danny A. Robertozzi, superintendent of schools
- Ahmed Shehata, Assistant Superintendent of Business/ Board Secretary

== Board of education ==
The district's board of education is comprised of nine members who set policy and oversee the fiscal and educational operation of the district through its administration. As a Type II school district, the board's trustees are elected directly by voters to serve three-year terms of office on a staggered basis, with three seats up for election each year held (since 2012) as part of the November general election. The board appoints a superintendent to oversee the district's day-to-day operations and a business administrator to supervise the business functions of the district.
