= 2013 VSI Tampa Bay FC season =

VSI Tampa Bay FC
2013 season
- Manager: (United States) Matt Weston; 5-2-0 Record (United States) Joel Harrison; 4-10-5 Record
- Stadium: Plant City Stadium
- USL Pro: 10th Place
- U.S. Open Cup: 2nd Round
- Top goalscorer: Mauricio Salles (10)
- Highest home attendance: 1,032 vs Rochester Rhinos (April 13)
- Lowest home attendance: 139 vs Phoenix FC (June 9)
- Average home league attendance: 378
Home colors	Away colors

VSI Tampa Bay FC played its only season in 2013. The club played in the USL Pro, the third tier of American soccer.

== Competitions ==
=== Preseason ===
23 February 2013 Match 1	VSI Tampa Bay	1 - 4	BK Häcken	Bradenton, Florida
12:00				Stadium: IMG Academy

1 March 2013 Match 2	FGCU Eagles	2 - 1	VSI Tampa Bay	Fort Myers, Florida
18:00				Stadium: FGCU Soccer Stadium

7 March 2013 Match 3	Tampa Spartans	1 - 2	VSI Tampa Bay	Tampa, Florida
19:00				Stadium: Pepin Stadium

21 March 2013 Match 4	Tampa Spartans	0 - 5	VSI Tampa Bay	Tampa, Florida
				Stadium: Pepin Stadium

23 March 2013 Match 5	USF Bulls	1 - 4	VSI Tampa Bay	Tampa, Florida
19:00				Stadium: Corbett Soccer Stadium

=== USL Pro ===
30 March 2013 Match 1	Phoenix FC	1 - 0	VSI Tampa Bay	Tempe, Arizona
20:30	Netinho 15'; Morrison (yellow card) 90'	Summary	Hoffer (yellow card) 47'	Stadium: Sun Devil Soccer Stadium; Attendance: 4,198

2 April 2013 Match 2	Los Angeles Blues	0 - 1	VSI Tampa Bay	Fullerton, California
19:00	Cortez (yellow card) 75'; Turner (yellow card) 87'	Summary	Jean Jacques (yellow card) 48'; Salles (yellow card) 63'; Neto 70'; Thurière (yellow card) 72'	Stadium: Titan Stadium; Attendance: 337

7 April 2013 Match 3	Portland Timbers Reserves	2 - 1	VSI Tampa Bay	Portland, Oregon
17:00	Nanchoff 53' (pen.); Rincón (yellow card) 54'; Valencia 81'	Summary	Salles 59'; Reynolds (yellow card) 89'	Stadium: Jeld-Wen Field; Attendance: 1,803; Referee: (United States) Scott Conner

13 April 2013 Match 4	VSI Tampa Bay	3 - 0	Rochester Rhinos	Plant City, Florida
19:30	Janneh 45'; Dos Santos 52'; Budnyi 74'	Summary	Earls (yellow card) 86'	Stadium: Plant City Stadium; Attendance: 1,032; Referee: (United States) Lance Jacob Vanhaitsma

21 April 2013 Match 5	VSI Tampa Bay	3 - 2	Los Angeles Blues	Plant City, Florida
18:30	Chin 28'; Reynolds 53'; Budnyi 74'	Summary	Davis IV 24'; Spitz 60'	Stadium: Plant City Stadium; Attendance: 423; Referee: (United States) Matt Miscannon

26 April 2013 Match 6	VSI Tampa Bay	0 - 1	Dayton Dutch Lions	Plant City, Florida
18:00	Dos Santos (yellow card) 69'; Budnyy (yellow card) 90'	Summary	Bardsley (yellow card) 55'; Swartzendruber 68', (yellow card) 70'	Stadium: Plant City Stadium; Attendance: 553; Referee: (United States) Michael Miscannon

3 May 2013 Match 7	VSI Tampa Bay	3 - 1	Antigua Barracuda FC	Plant City, Florida
20:00	Donatelli 52'; Salles 75', 90+'	Summary	Thomas 8'; Phillip (red card) 90+'	Stadium: Plant City Stadium; Attendance: 256; Referee: (United States) Donald Thompson

26 May 2013 Match 8	VSI Tampa Bay	1 - 0	Wilmington Hammerheads	Plant City, Florida
19:30	Noone 71'; Hoffer (yellow card) 74'	Summary	Utterson (yellow card) 5'; Elenio (yellow card) 44'; Perry (yellow card) 49'; Taylor (yellow card) 89'	Stadium: Plant City Stadium; Attendance: 253; Referee: Patrick O'Brien

1 June 2013 Match 9	VSI Tampa Bay	4 - 4	Portland Timbers Reserves	Plant City, Florida
19:30	Budnyi 1', 12'; Chin 18'; Dos Santos 45'; Horwath (yellow card) 70'; Hoffer (yellow card) 89'	Summary	Nanchoff 5', (yellow card) 78'; Tucker-Gagnes (yellow card) 12'; Rincón 47'; Valencia 56'; Zizzo 68' (pen.)	Stadium: Plant City Stadium; Referee: Cedric Adams

7 June 2013 Match 10	VSI Tampa Bay	8 - 0	Antigua Barracuda FC	Plant City, Florida
19:30	Salles 1', 11', 12', 17', 26'; Chin 45'; Thurière 72'; Janneh 86'	Summary	Kirwan (yellow card) 69'; Pyle (yellow card) 86'	Stadium: Plant City Stadium; Attendance: 250; Referee: Marcus Dialovera

9 June 2013 Match 11	VSI Tampa Bay	1 - 0	Phoenix FC	Plant City, Florida
19:00	Interim Head Coach Harrison (red card) 35'; Horwath (red card) 64'; Burt 73'	Summary	Obodai (yellow card) 33'; Boufleur (yellow card) 54'; Ramos (yellow card) 87'	Stadium: Plant City Stadium; Attendance: 139; Referee: Mike Miscannon

14 June 2013 Match 12	Rochester Rhinos	3 - 0	VSI Tampa Bay	Rochester, New York
19:35	Rosenlund 4'; McManus 53'; Duckett (yellow card) 58'; Brettschneider 66'	Summary		Stadium: Sahlen's Stadium; Attendance: 5,689; Referee: Marc Lawrence

16 June 2013 Match 13	Dayton Dutch Lions	2 - 1	VSI Tampa Bay	Beavercreek, Ohio
18:30	Klaase 10'; Westdijk 30'	Summary	Horwath (yellow card) 31'; Bundu 34'; Reynolds (yellow card) 45'	Stadium: Beavercreek High School; Attendance: 932; Referee: Britton Maier

21 June 2013 Match 14	Charlotte Eagles	1 - 0	VSI Tampa Bay	Charlotte, North Carolina
19:00	Villaseñor 74'; Bryant (yellow card) 89'	Summary		Stadium: Queens Sports Complex; Attendance: 741; Referee: Christopher Spivey

22 June 2013 Match 15	Charleston Battery	0 - 0	VSI Tampa Bay	Charleston, South Carolina
19:30	Falvey (yellow card) 68' vanSchaik (yellow card) 86'	Summary	Freitas (yellow card) 74'; Stigall (yellow card) 76'; Noone (yellow card) 86'	Stadium: Blackbaud Stadium; Attendance: 5,111; Referee: Juan Colazo

30 June 2013 Match 16	VSI Tampa Bay	0 - 0	Richmond Kickers	Plant City, Florida
19:35	Donatelli (yellow card) 57'; Toby (yellow card) 71'; Chin (yellow card) 83'	Summary	Davies (yellow card) 42'; Ownby (yellow card) 80'	Stadium: Plant City Stadium; Referee: Don Dellavia

13 July 2013 Match 17	VSI Tampa Bay	4 - 2	Charleston Battery	Plant City, Florida
19:30	Donatelli 7'; Rife 12', (yellow card) 90'; Burt 19' (pen.); Bundu 59'	Summary	Wiltse (yellow card) 18'; Alderson (yellow card) 47'; Cordovéz 63'; Cuevas 90' (pen.)	Stadium: Plant City Stadium; Referee: Mike Miscannon

19 July 2013 Match 18	VSI Tampa Bay	0 - 2	Harrisburg City Islanders	Plant City, Florida
19:30	Thurière (yellow card) 44'	Summary	Mkosana 12'; McLaughlin 87'	Stadium: Plant City Stadium; Referee: Mark Cadalissic

26 July 2013 Match 19	Wilmington Hammerheads	2 - 1	VSI Tampa Bay	Wilmington, North Carolina
19:30	Nicklaw 23'; Arnoux (yellow card) 68'; Nicholson (yellow card) 88'; Heaney (red card) 90'	Summary	Burt 39'	Stadium: Legion Stadium; Referee: Jeremy Smith

28 July 2013 Match 20	Richmond Kickers	0 - 0	VSI Tampa Bay	Richmond, Virginia
17:00	Nyazamba (yellow card) 38'; Ngwenya (yellow card) 90'	Summary	Dixon (yellow card) 71'; Dos Santos (yellow card) 90'	Stadium: City Stadium; Referee: Michael Samaan

2 August 2013 Match 21	VSI Tampa Bay	1 - 2	Pittsburgh Riverhounds	Plant City, Florida
19:30	Hoffer (yellow card) 23'; Donatelli 36'	Summary	Vincent 54'; Costanzo 58'; Green (yellow card) 66'; Seth (yellow card) 77'	Stadium: Plant City Stadium; Referee: Patrick O'Brien

4 August 2013 Match 22	VSI Tampa Bay	0 - 3	Orlando City	Plant City, Florida
19:00	Budnyi (yellow card) 45'; Horwath (yellow card) 45'; Noone (yellow card) 63'; Salles (yellow card) 88'	Summary	Duke 16'; Valentino 45'; Braun 51'; Sapong (yellow card) 67'	Stadium: Plant City Stadium; Attendance: 594; Referee: Kristen Salazar

7 August 2013 Match 23	Orlando City	3 - 2	VSI Tampa Bay	Orlando, Florida
19:30	Boufleur 32'; Roberts 51' (o.g.); Boden (yellow card) 62'; D. Chin 80'; Duke (yellow card) 87'	Summary	Burt 26'; Hoffer (yellow card) 32'; Salles (yellow card) 54'; S. Chin 69'	Stadium: Fifth Third Bank Field; Attendance: 5,985; Referee: Marcos DeOliveira

10 August 2013 Match 24	Harrisburg City Islanders	3 - 1	VSI Tampa Bay	Harrisburg, Pennsylvania
19:00	Mkosana 40', 67', 83'; Zizzi (yellow card) 34'	Summary	Salles 61'; Budnyi (yellow card) 88'	Stadium: Skyline Sports Complex; Attendance: 2,170; Referee: John Douglas

11 August 2013 Match 25	Pittsburgh Riverhounds	3 - 2	VSI Tampa Bay	Pittsburgh, Pennsylvania
15:30	Angulo 53' (pen.); Seth (yellow card) 56'; Vincent 60'; Amoo 68'	Summary	Burt 70'; Budnyi 85'	Stadium: Highmark Stadium; Attendance: 3,693; Referee: Charles Murphy

16 August 2013 Match 26	VSI Tampa Bay	3 - 3	Charlotte Eagles	Plant City, Florida
19:30	Salles 44'; Dos Santos 63'; Burt 87'; Budnyi (yellow card) 89'	Summary	Ramirez 16', 43'; Okai 58', (yellow card) 83'	Stadium: Plant City Stadium; Attendance: 297; Referee: Mike Miscannon

=== U.S. Open Cup ===
14 May 2013 First Round	Orlando City U-23	1–1 (a.e.t.) (3–5 p)	VSI Tampa Bay	Sanford, Florida
19:00	Russo 50'; Sowers (yellow card) 95'; Fubara (yellow card) 107'	Report	Budnyi 6'; Thurière (yellow card) 97'	Stadium: Seminole Soccer Complex; Referee: Donald Dellavia
	Penalties
	Clowes (penalty scored); Blackwood (penalty scored); Russo (penalty scored); Sowers (penalty missed)		(penalty scored) Donatelli; (penalty scored) Hoffer; (penalty scored) Burt; (penalty scored) Noone; (penalty scored) Rife

21 May 2013 Second Round	VSI Tampa Bay	1–2	Tampa Bay Rowdies	Plant City, Florida
19:30	Hoffer (yellow card) 20'; Noone 27'; Freitas (yellow card) 65'	report	Arango (yellow card) 16'; Hristov 21', 43'	Stadium: Plant City Stadium; Referee: Jonathan Weiner

=== Standings ===
Pos	Team	Pld	W	T	L	GF	GA	GD	Pts	Qualification
8	Dayton Dutch Lions (A)	26	10	7	9	43	46	−3	37	Playoffs
9	Wilmington Hammerheads	26	11	4	11	35	39	−4	36 (Note: Wilmington were deducted one point for fielding an ineligible player on July 21 against Pittsburgh.)	
10	VSI Tampa Bay	26	9	5	12	41	39	+2	32	
11	Rochester Rhinos	26	6	10	10	25	39	−14	28	
12	Phoenix FC	26	5	7	14	28	41	−13	22	

Source: USL Pro official standings
Rules for classification: 1) points; 2) goal difference; 3) number of goals scored.
(A) Advances to USL Pro Playoffs
