= 2013 U.S. Open Cup =

100th edition of cup competition in American soccer

2013 Lamar Hunt U.S. Open Cup
Tournament details
- Country: United States
- Teams: 68

Final positions
- Champions: D.C. United (3rd title)
- Runners-up: Real Salt Lake
- 2014–15 CONCACAF Champions League: D.C. United

Tournament statistics
- Matches played: 67
- Goals scored: 220 (3.28 per match)
- Top goal scorer(s): Dwayne De Rosario; Frédéric Piquionne (5)

The 2013 Lamar Hunt U.S. Open Cup was the 100th edition of the oldest ongoing competition in American soccer. Qualification began in November 2012 in the fifth tier, although the United States Soccer Federation did not announce the format until March 5, 2013.

The defending champions were Sporting Kansas City, who were knocked out of the competition in the fourth round. D.C. United received a $250,000 cash prize and a berth into the 2014–15 CONCACAF Champions League for winning the tournament, while Real Salt Lake received $60,000 for being the runner-up. Three teams received $15,000 for being the top finisher from each lower division - Des Moines Menace (USL PDL), Orlando City (USL Pro), & Carolina RailHawks (NASL).

== Qualification ==
Two play-in matches were conducted between 2 NPSL teams and the entrants for USCS and SS with the winners entering the first round.

Enter in Play-In Round	Enter in first round		Enter in second round	Enter in third round
NPSL/USCS/USSSA; 2 teams/1 team/1 team	NPSL/USASA/USL PDL/USL PRO; 6 teams/8 teams/16 teams/4 teams		NASL/USL PRO; 6 teams/8 teams	MLS; 16 teams
National Premier Soccer League: FC Hasental; Georgia Revolution; United States Club Soccer: Fresno Fuego Future; United States Specialty Sports Association: Colorado Rovers Soccer Club	National Premier Soccer League: Brooklyn Italians; Chattanooga FC; FC Sonic Lehigh Valley; Madison 56ers; New York Red Bulls U23s; Sacramento Gold; United States Adult Soccer Association: Dearborn Stars; Doxa Italia; Icon FC; Massachusetts Premier Soccer; NTX Rayados; PSA Elite; Red Force FC; RWB Adria	USL PRO: Dayton Dutch Lions; Pittsburgh Riverhounds; Phoenix FC; VSI Tampa Bay FC; Premier Development League: Austin Aztex; Carolina Dynamo; Des Moines Menace^{$}; FC Tucson; GPS Portland Phoenix; Laredo Heat; Michigan Bucks; Ocala Stampede; Ocean City Nor'easters; Orlando City U-23; Portland Timbers U23s; Reading United; Real Colorado Foxes; River City Rovers; Seattle Sounders FC U-23; Ventura County Fusion	NASL: Atlanta Silverbacks; Carolina RailHawks^{$}; Fort Lauderdale Strikers; Minnesota United FC; San Antonio Scorpions; Tampa Bay Rowdies; USL PRO: Charleston Battery; Charlotte Eagles; Harrisburg City Islanders; Los Angeles Blues; Orlando City^{$}; Richmond Kickers; Rochester Rhinos; Wilmington Hammerheads	Chicago Fire; Chivas USA; Colorado Rapids; Columbus Crew; FC Dallas; D.C. United^{$$$}; Houston Dynamo; Los Angeles Galaxy; New England Revolution; New York Red Bulls; Philadelphia Union; Portland Timbers; Real Salt Lake^{$$}; San Jose Earthquakes; Seattle Sounders FC; Sporting Kansas City

- $: Winner of $15,000 bonus for advancing the furthest in the competition from their respective divisions.
- $$: Winner of $60,000 for being the runner-up in the competition.
- $$$: Winner of $250,000 for winning the competition.

== Brackets ==
Home team is listed first, winners are in bold.

Play-In Round (May 7)
USCS	Fresno Fuego Future	3
NPSL	**FC Hasental**	**5**
USSSA	Colorado Rovers	1(3)
NPSL	**Georgia Revolution**	**1(5)**

Advances to first round
NPSL	FC Hasental
NPSL	Georgia Revolution

First round (May 14/15)
**PDL**	**GPS Portland Phoenix**	**2**
USASA	Mass Premier	0
NPSL	Brooklyn Italians	1
**USASA**	**Icon FC**	**4**
**PDL**	**Reading United**	**2**
NPSL	FC Sonic Lehigh Valley	0
**PDL**	**Carolina Dynamo**	**4(4)**
NPSL	Chattanooga FC	4(1)
PDL	Orlando City U-23	1(3)
**USLP**	**VSI Tampa Bay FC**	**1(5)**
USASA	Red Force FC	2
**PDL**	**Ocala Stampede**	**4**
**PDL**	**Des Moines Menace**	**1**
NPSL	Madison 56ers	0
**PDL**	**FC Tucson**	**2**
USLP	Phoenix FC	1
**PDL**	**Austin Aztex**	**3**
USASA	NTX Rayados	0
**PDL**	**Ventura County Fusion**	**3**
NPSL	FC Hasental	2
**PDL**	**Portland Timbers U23s**	**3**
NPSL	Sacramento Gold	2
**PDL**	**Seattle Sounders FC U-23**	**5**
USASA	Doxa Italia	1
**NPSL**	**Georgia Revolution**	**4**
PDL	Real Colorado Foxes	3
**PDL**	**Laredo Heat**	**2**
USASA	PSA Elite	0
**PDL**	**Ocean City Nor'easters**	**2**
NPSL	New York Red Bulls U23s	0
**USLP**	**Pittsburgh Riverhounds**	**1(5)**
USASA	RWB Adria	1(3)
**USLP**	**Dayton Dutch Lions**	**3**
PDL	River City Rovers	0
PDL	Michigan Bucks	0
**USASA**	**Dearborn Stars**	**2**

Second round (May 21)
**USLP**	**Rochester Rhinos**	**1**
PDL	GPS Portland Phoenix	0
**USLP**	**Richmond Kickers**	**4**
USASA	Icon FC	1
**PDL**	**Reading United**	**1**
USLP	Harrisburg City Islanders	0
**NASL**	**Carolina RailHawks**	**3**
PDL	Carolina Dynamo	1
USLP	VSI Tampa Bay FC	1
**NASL**	**Tampa Bay Rowdies**	**2**
PDL	Ocala Stampede	1
**USLP**	**Orlando City**	**2**
NASL	Minnesota United	0
**PDL**	**Des Moines Menace**	**1**
NASL	San Antonio Scorpions	2(3)
**PDL**	**FC Tucson**	**2(4)**
PDL	Austin Aztex	0
**USLP**	**Wilmington Hammerheads**	**2**
**USLP**	**Los Angeles Blues**	**5**
PDL	Ventura County Fusion	1
PDL	Portland Timbers U23s	0
**USLP**	**Charleston Battery**	**1**
**USLP**	**Charlotte Eagles**	**3**
PDL	Seattle Sounders FC U-23	0
NPSL	Georgia Revolution	2
**NASL**	**Atlanta Silverbacks**	**3**
**NASL**	**Fort Lauderdale Strikers**	**1(7)**
PDL	Laredo Heat	1(6)
**PDL**	**Ocean City Nor'easters**	**1**
USLP	Pittsburgh Riverhounds	0
**USLP**	**Dayton Dutch Lions** (aet)	**4**
USASA	Dearborn Stars	1

Third round (May 28/29)
USLP	Rochester Rhinos	1
**MLS**	**New England Revolution**	**5**
USLP	Richmond Kickers	0(2)
**MLS**	**D.C. United**	**0(4)**
**MLS**	**New York Red Bulls**	**2**
PDL	Reading United	0
**NASL**	**Carolina RailHawks**	**2**
MLS	Los Angeles Galaxy	0
**NASL**	**Tampa Bay Rowdies**	**1**
MLS	Seattle Sounders FC	0
MLS	Colorado Rapids	1
**USLP**	**Orlando City**	**3**
**MLS**	**Sporting Kansas City**	**2**
PDL	Des Moines Menace	0
**MLS**	**Houston Dynamo**	**2**
PDL	FC Tucson	0
**MLS**	**Portland Timbers**	**5**
USLP	Wilmington Hammerheads	1
USLP	Los Angeles Blues	1
**MLS**	**Chivas USA**	**2**
**USLP**	**Charleston Battery**	**1**
MLS	San Jose Earthquakes	0
USLP	Charlotte Eagles	0
**MLS**	**Chicago Fire**	**2**
**MLS**	**Real Salt Lake**	**3**
NASL	Atlanta Silverbacks	2
NASL	Fort Lauderdale Strikers	0
**MLS**	**FC Dallas**	**2**
**MLS**	**Philadelphia Union**	**2**
PDL	Ocean City Nor'easters	1
**MLS**	**Columbus Crew**	**2**
USLP	Dayton Dutch Lions	1

Fourth round (June 12/13)
**MLS**	**Chicago Fire**	**2**
MLS	Columbus Crew	1
MLS	Sporting Kansas City	0
**USLP**	**Orlando City**	**1**
**MLS**	**D.C. United**	**3**
MLS	Philadelphia Union	1
**MLS**	**New England Revolution**	**4**
MLS	New York Red Bulls	2
**MLS**	**Real Salt Lake** (aet)	**5**
USLP	Charleston Battery	2
**NASL**	**Carolina RailHawks** (aet)	**3**
MLS	Chivas USA	1
**MLS**	**FC Dallas**	**3**
MLS	Houston Dynamo	0
**MLS**	**Portland Timbers**	**2**
NASL	Tampa Bay Rowdies	0

Quarterfinals (June 26)
**MLS**	**Chicago Fire**	**5**
USLP	Orlando City	1
**MLS**	**D.C. United**	**3**
MLS	New England Revolution	1
**MLS**	**Real Salt Lake**	**3**
NASL	Carolina RailHawks	0
MLS	FC Dallas	2
**MLS**	**Portland Timbers**	**3**

Semifinals (August 7)
MLS	Chicago Fire	0
MLS	**D.C. United**	**2**
MLS	**Real Salt Lake**	**2**
MLS	Portland Timbers	1

Final (October 1)
**MLS**	**D.C. United**	**1**
MLS	Real Salt Lake	0

== Schedule ==
=== Play-In Round ===
May 7, 2013	Fresno Fuego Future (USCS)	3–5	FC Hasental (NPSL)	Fresno, California
7:00 PM PDT	Islas 3'; Campos 75'; Celosmanovic 90'	Report	Villalobos 29', 60'; Gaitan 50'; Anguiano 67', 78'	Stadium: Chukchansi Park; Referee: Matthew Buckman

May 7, 2013	Colorado Rovers (USSSA)	1–1 (a.e.t.) (3–5 p)	Georgia Revolution (NPSL)	Highlands Ranch, Colorado
8:00 PM MDT	Herschberger 74'	Report	Poku 25'	Stadium: Shea Stadium; Referee: Younes Marrakchi
	Penalties
	Penalty missed Penalty scored		(penalty scored) Barbero; (penalty scored) Nwiloh; (penalty scored) Walker; (penalty scored) Landberg; (penalty scored) Nikos

=== First round ===
May 14, 2013 Match 1	Reading United AC (PDL)	2–0	FC Sonic Lehigh Valley (NPSL)	Oley, Pennsylvania
7:00 PM EDT	Sweat (yellow card) 45'; Madison 50'; Neumann 55'; Ndjock (yellow card) 63'	Report	Sales (yellow card) 82'	Stadium: Oley Valley High School; Referee: Eric Weisbrod

May 14, 2013 Match 2	GPS Portland Phoenix (PDL)	2–0	Mass Premier (USASA)	Portland, Maine
8:00 PM EDT	Omanga 1', 90' (pen.); Bompart (yellow card) 27'; Sandeman (yellow card) 43'; Israel (red card) 76'	Report		Stadium: Memorial Field; Referee: Boris Senic

May 14, 2013 Match 3	Brooklyn Italians (NPSL)	1–4	Icon FC (USASA)	Brooklyn, New York
8:00 PM EDT	Parker 78'; Bekoe (yellow card); Guerrier (yellow card)	Report	Duka 12', 51', 76'; Garcia 67'; Yazo (yellow card)	Stadium: Aviator Sports Complex; Referee: Robert Sibiga

May 14, 2013 Match 4	Carolina Dynamo (PDL)	4–4 (a.e.t.) (4–1 p)	Chattanooga FC (NPSL)	Greensboro, North Carolina
7:00 PM EDT	Martínez 22'; Ilhan 83' (pen.), 88', 118'	Report	Ochieng (yellow card) 44'; Winter 53' (yellow card) 83'; Charmey 66', 77'; Reyneke (yellow card) 112'; Glover 115'	Stadium: Macpherson Stadium; Attendance: 1,221; Referee: Chris Spivey
	Penalties
	Ilhan (penalty scored); Jennings (penalty scored); Fender (penalty scored); Durand (penalty scored)		(penalty scored) Ferraz; (penalty missed) Royark; (penalty missed) Ochieng

May 14, 2013 Match 5	Red Force FC (USASA)	2–4	Ocala Stampede (PDL)	Miami, Florida
7:30 PM EDT	Hernandez 21', 53'; (yellow card) 31'	Report	Bailey 8', 62' (yellow card) 52'; Hogg 46' (pen.), 88'	Stadium: Florida International Soccer Stadium; Referee: Lance Jacob Vanhaitsma

May 14, 2013 Match 6	Orlando City U-23 (PDL)	1–1 (a.e.t.) (3–5 p)	VSI Tampa Bay FC (USL Pro)	Sanford, Florida
7:00 PM EDT	Garcia 50'; Sowers (yellow card) 95'; Fubara (yellow card) 107'	Report	Budnyi 6'; Thurière (yellow card) 97'	Stadium: Seminole Soccer Complex; Attendance: 535; Referee: Donald Dellavia
	Penalties
	Clowes (penalty scored); Blackwood (penalty scored); Garcia (penalty scored); Sowers (penalty missed)		(penalty scored) Donatelli; (penalty scored) Hoffer; (penalty scored) Burt; (penalty scored) Noone; (penalty scored) Rife

May 15, 2013 Match 7	Des Moines Menace (PDL)	1–0	Madison 56ers (NPSL)	West Des Moines, Iowa
7:30 PM CDT	Tulloch 50'	Report	Schneider (yellow card) 52'; Balshaw (yellow card) 71'	Stadium: Valley Stadium; Referee: Jon Freemon

May 14, 2013 Match 8	Austin Aztex (PDL)	3–0	NTX Rayados (USASA)	Austin, Texas
7:30 PM CDT	Cuero 14'; Guillen (red card) 24'; Spence 33' (o.g.); Rocha 85'	Report	Byars (yellow card) 25'; Dwyer (yellow card) 34'; Swann (yellow card) 36'; Pinal (yellow card) 42'; Guzman (yellow card) 80'	Stadium: House Park; Attendance: 638; Referee: Juliana Duncan

May 14, 2013 Match 9	FC Tucson (PDL)	2–1	Phoenix FC (USL Pro)	Tucson, Arizona
7:30 PM MST	Robinson (yellow card) 24'; Galbraith-Knapp (yellow card) 79'; Bevans 82', 90+'	Report; Report	Bowen (yellow card) 13'; Netinho (yellow card) 28'; King (yellow card) 57'; Hedrick (yellow card) 61'; Faria 63'; Obodai (yellow card) 71'	Stadium: Kino Sports Complex Grandstand; Attendance: 910; Referee: Ramy Touchan

May 14, 2013 Match 10	Portland Timbers U23s (PDL)	3–2	Sacramento Gold (NPSL)	Portland, Oregon
7:30 PM PDT	Seymore (yellow card) 33'; Foxhoven 38'; Conelian 41'; Sherrod 78'; Miller (yellow card) 84'; Lurie (yellow card) 87'; Barnes (yellow card) 90'	Report	Alvarez 5', 25'; Chambers (yellow card) 47'; Fonseca (yellow card) 61'; Piña (yellow card) 71'	Stadium: JELD-WEN Field; Referee: Ronald Lagraff

May 14, 2013 Match 11	Ventura County Fusion (PDL)	3–2	FC Hasental (NPSL)	Ventura, California
7:00 PM PDT	López 45'; Otte 77' (pen.); Minter 87'	Report	Contreras (yellow card) 33'; Cazarez 37'; Villalobos 68'	Stadium: Ventura College; Referee: Reed Christy

May 14, 2013 Match 12	Seattle Sounders FC U-23 (PDL)	5–1	Doxa Italia (USASA)	Sumner, Washington
7:00 PM PDT	Jones 13'; Geno 19', 36', 38', 45'; Uyehara (yellow card) 71'	Report	Byrne 68'; Lockhart (yellow card) 72'; Carlidge (yellow card) 89'	Stadium: Sunset Chevrolet Stadium; Attendance: 473; Referee: Katja Koroleva

May 14, 2013 Match 13	Laredo Heat (PDL)	2–0	PSA Elite (USASA)	Laredo, Texas
8:15 PM CDT	Garza 44'; Medeiros 47'	Report Report 2		Stadium: Texas A&M International University Soccer Complex; Attendance: 734; Referee: Kyle Phillips

May 14, 2013 Match 14	Georgia Revolution (NPSL)	4–3	Real Colorado Foxes (PDL)	Conyers, Georgia
7:00 PM EDT	Poku 15', 43', 56'; Maduka 40'	Report	Tarnoczi 63'; Salvaggione 64'; Skipworth 79'	Stadium: RYSA Soccerplex; Referee: Richonne Clark

May 14, 2013 Match 15	Pittsburgh Riverhounds (USL Pro)	1–1 (a.e.t.) (5–4 p)	RWB Adria (USASA)	Pittsburgh, Pennsylvania
7:00 PM EDT	C'deBaca 53'	Report	Munoz 17'	Stadium: Highmark Stadium; Attendance: 1,400; Referee: John Douglas
	Penalties
	Penalty scored		Penalty scored Penalty missed

May 14, 2013 Match 16	Ocean City Nor'easters (PDL)	2–0	New York Red Bulls U23s (NPSL)	Ocean City, New Jersey
7:30 PM EDT	Lacroix 14'; Perea 58'	Report		Stadium: Carey Stadium; Attendance: 603; Referee: Neil Barbulescu

May 14, 2013 Match 17	Michigan Bucks (PDL)	0–2	Dearborn Stars (USASA)	Pontiac, Michigan
7:30 PM EDT		Report	Djokic 57', 90'; Saydee (yellow card) 66'	Stadium: Ultimate Soccer Arenas; Referee: Marc Lawrence

May 14, 2013 Match 18	Dayton Dutch Lions (USL Pro)	3–0	River City Rovers (PDL)	Beavercreek, Ohio
7:00 PM EDT	Khutsidze 8'; Kissinger 27'; Westdijk 48'	Report		Stadium: Beavercreek High School; Referee: Vito Testa, Jr.

=== Second round ===
May 21, 2013 Match 19	Reading United (PDL)	1–0	Harrisburg City Islanders (USL Pro)	Reading, Pennsylvania
7:30 PM EDT	Pinto-Neto 9'; Rosenberry (yellow card) 42'; Lowe (yellow card) 67'; Neumann (yellow card) 90+'	Report	Touray (yellow card) 67'	Stadium: Don Thomas Stadium; Referee: Ian Bongaardt

May 21, 2013 Match 20	Rochester Rhinos (USL Pro)	1–0	GPS Portland Phoenix (PDL)	Rochester, New York
7:35 PM EDT	Duckett 65'	Report		Stadium: Sahlen's Stadium; Attendance: 2,678; Referee: Steve Montanino

May 21, 2013 Match 21	Richmond Kickers (USL Pro)	4–1	Icon FC (USASA)	Richmond, Virginia
7:00 PM EDT	Nyazamba 11', 85'; Ngwenya 21' (pen.); OG 61'	Report	Duka 9'	Stadium: Richmond City Stadium; Attendance: 787; Referee: Mark Gorak

May 21, 2013 Match 22	Carolina RailHawks (NASL)	3–1	Carolina Dynamo (PDL)	Cary, North Carolina
7:00 PM EDT	Shipalane 26' da Luz 53'; Schilawski 75'	Report	Martínez 39'	Stadium: WakeMed Soccer Park; Referee: Daniel Burak

May 21, 2013 Match 23	Ocala Stampede (PDL)	1–2	Orlando City (USL Pro)	Ocala, Florida
7:00 PM EDT	Blandon 58'	Report	Dwyer 27'; Mbengue 50'	Stadium: Forest High School; Attendance: 1,030; Referee: Marcos DeOliveira

May 21, 2013 Match 24	VSI Tampa Bay FC (USL Pro)	1–2	Tampa Bay Rowdies (NASL)	Plant City, Florida
7:30 PM EDT	Hoffer (yellow card) 20'; Noone 27'; Freitas (yellow card) 65'	report	Arango (yellow card) 16'; Hristov 21', 43'	Stadium: Plant City Stadium; Referee: Jonathan Weiner

May 21, 2013 Match 25	Minnesota United (NASL)	0–1	Des Moines Menace (PDL)	Saint Paul, Minnesota
7:30 PM CDT	Dias (yellow card) 34'	report	Hoek (yellow card) 42'; Lax (yellow card) 67'; Fricke 86'	Stadium: Elizabeth Lyle Robbie Stadium; Attendance: 1,009; Referee: Artem Sher

May 21, 2013 Match 26	Austin Aztex (PDL)	0–2	Wilmington Hammerheads (USL Pro)	Austin, Texas
7:30 PM CDT	Cook (red card) 23'	report	Isberner 23'; Cruz 68' (o.g.)	Stadium: House Park; Attendance: 686; Referee: Luis Guardia

May 21, 2013 Match 27	San Antonio Scorpions (NASL)	2–2 (a.e.t.) (3 – 4 p)	FC Tucson (PDL)	San Antonio, Texas
7:30 PM CDT	Harmse 30'; Denissen 90+'	report	Velazco 57'; Robinson 67'	Stadium: Toyota Field; Attendance: 3,578; Referee: Hayden Edwards
	Penalties
	Wagner (penalty scored); Phelan (penalty missed); Ramirez (penalty scored); Denissen (penalty scored); Harmse (penalty missed)		(penalty scored) Carter; (penalty scored) Brandt; (penalty scored) Zimmerman; (penalty scored) Collins

May 21, 2013 Match 28	Portland Timbers U23s (PDL)	0–1	Charleston Battery (USL Pro)	Portland, Oregon
7:30 PM PDT	Lurie (yellow card) 55'	report	Prince (yellow card) 11' vanSchaik (yellow card) 20'; Savage 60'; Paterson (yellow card) 90'	Stadium: JELD-WEN Field; Referee: Josh Wilkens

May 21, 2013 Match 29	Los Angeles Blues (USL Pro)	5–1	Ventura County Fusion (PDL)	Fullerton, California
6:30 PM PDT	G. Gonzalez 4'; Spitz 7'; Momeni 12'; Russell 29', 35'	report	Palacios (yellow card) 40'; Schmetz 87'	Stadium: Titan Stadium; Referee: Ashbir Singh

May 21, 2013 Match 30	Charlotte Eagles (USL Pro)	3–0	Seattle Sounders FC U-23 (PDL)	Charlotte, North Carolina
7:00 PM EDT	Yates 57'; Herrera 65' (pen.), 70'	report	Raskasky (yellow card) 64'; David (yellow card) 77'	Stadium: Queens University of Charlotte Sports Complex; Referee: Brandon Marion

May 21, 2013 Match 31	Fort Lauderdale Strikers (NASL)	1–1 (a.e.t.) (7–6 p)	Laredo Heat (PDL)	Fort Lauderdale, Florida
7:30 PM EDT	Anderson 54'	report	Barbosa (red card) 66'; Botero 83'	Stadium: Lockhart Stadium; Referee: Andres Pfefferkorn
	Penalties
	De Mujica (penalty scored); Anderson (penalty scored); Gonzalez (penalty scored); Ramos (penalty scored); Dimitrov (penalty scored); King (penalty scored); Guillaume (penalty missed); Ståhl (penalty scored)		(penalty scored) Ibarra; (penalty scored) Kocic; (penalty scored) Medeiros; (penalty scored) de Armas; (penalty scored) Botero; (penalty scored) Navarro; (penalty missed) Hernandez; (penalty missed) Mulamba

May 21, 2013 Match 32	Georgia Revolution (NPSL)	2–3	Atlanta Silverbacks (NASL)	Conyers, Georgia
7:00 PM EDT	Smith 16'; Enang 61'	report	Luna 4', 31' (pen.); Cruz 57'	Stadium: RYSA Soccerplex; Referee: Patrick Baker

May 21, 2013 Match 33	Ocean City Nor'easters (PDL)	1–0	Pittsburgh Riverhounds (USL Pro)	Ocean City, New Jersey
7:30 PM CDT	Tribbett 68'	report Report 2		Stadium: Carey Stadium; Attendance: 551; Referee: Ayodeji Obisesan

May 21, 2013 Match 34	Dayton Dutch Lions (USL Pro)	4–1 (a.e.t.)	Dearborn Stars (USASA)	Beavercreek, Ohio
7:00 PM EDT	Madigan 43'; Bardsley 96'; Westdijk (yellow card) 101' (goal) 119'; DeLass 106'	report	Kaba 27' (red card) 57'; Wilkes (yellow card) 45'; Djokic (yellow card) 104' (red card) 113'; Beshara (red card) 105+'	Stadium: Beavercreek High School; Referee: Andrew Bigelow

=== Third round ===
May 28, 2013	Rochester Rhinos (USL Pro)	1–5	New England Revolution (MLS)	Rochester, New York
7:35 PM EDT	LaBauex (yellow card) 44'; McFayden 77', (red card) 90+1'	Report	Rowe 23', 64'; Dorman 53'; Bengtson 54', (yellow card) 61'; Barrett 82'	Stadium: Sahlen's Stadium; Attendance: 5,014; Referee: Robert Sibiga (New York)

May 28, 2013	Philadelphia Union (MLS)	2–1	Ocean City Nor'easters (PDL)	Chester, Pennsylvania
7:30 PM EDT	McInerney 48'; Carroll 90+3'	Report	Kollie 90+1'	Stadium: PPL Park; Attendance: 6798; Referee: Jose Carlos Rivero (New York)

May 28, 2013	Richmond Kickers (USL Pro)	0–0 (a.e.t.) (2–4 p)	D.C. United (MLS)	Richmond, Virginia
7:00 PM EDT	Yeisley (yellow card) 57'; Delicâte (yellow card) 73'; Dykstra (yellow card) 120'	Report	Pontius (yellow card) 82'; Korb (yellow card) 90' (yellow-red card) 113'; Ruiz (red card) 117'	Stadium: City Stadium; Attendance: 4752; Referee: Eric Weisbrod (Pennsylvania)
	Penalties
	Görres (penalty missed); Ngwenya (penalty missed); Vercollone (penalty scored); Robinson (penalty scored)		(penalty scored) De Rosario; (penalty scored) Kitchen; (penalty scored) DeLeon; (penalty scored) Riley

May 28, 2013	Sporting Kansas City (MLS)	2–0	Des Moines Menace (PDL)	Kansas City, Kansas
7:30 PM CDT	Kamara 12'; Thomas (yellow card) 33'; Bieler 73'	Report	Thaden (yellow card) 40'; Harmon (yellow card) 54'	Stadium: Sporting Park; Attendance: 15,621; Referee: Jon Freemon (Kansas)

May 28, 2013	Los Angeles Blues (USL Pro)	1–2	Chivas USA (MLS)	Fullerton, California
7:30 PM PDT	Davis IV 11'; Jock (yellow card) 25'; Pizarro (yellow card) 60'	Report	Alvarez 52'; Kennedy 62' (pen.); Bolaños (yellow card) 71' de Luna (yellow card) 77'; Borja (yellow card) 90+2'	Stadium: Titan Stadium; Referee: Daniel Radford (California)

May 28, 2013	Fort Lauderdale Strikers (NASL)	0–2	FC Dallas (MLS)	Fort Lauderdale, Florida
7:30 PM EDT	Pecka (yellow card) 66'; Restrepo (yellow card) 73'	Report	Michel (yellow card) 37'; Hedges (yellow card) 45', (goal) 66'; Pérez 54'; Castillo (yellow card) 75'; Woodberry (yellow card) 83'	Stadium: Lockhart Stadium; Referee: Marcos DeOliveira (Florida)

May 28, 2013	Orlando City (USL Pro)	3–1	Colorado Rapids (MLS)	Orlando, Florida
7:30 PM EDT	Burke 4', (yellow card) 30'; Pulis (yellow card) 33'; Dwyer 48', 63'; Mbengue (yellow card) 65'	Report	Hill 18'; O'Neill (yellow card) 36'; Ceus (red card) 56'; Harris (yellow card) 82'	Stadium: Florida Citrus Bowl; Attendance: 4128; Referee: Ted Unkel (Florida)

May 28, 2013	Charleston Battery (USL Pro)	1–0	San Jose Earthquakes (MLS)	Charleston, South Carolina
7:30 PM EDT	Cuevas (yellow card) 45'; Paterson (yellow card) 62'; Falvey 73'	Report	Morrow (yellow card) 27'; Lenhart (yellow card) 30'; Ring (yellow card) 40' (yellow-red card) 74'	Stadium: Blackbaud Stadium; Attendance: 1954; Referee: Mark Kadlecik (North Carolina)

May 28, 2013	Real Salt Lake (MLS)	3–2 (a.e.t.)	Atlanta Silverbacks (NASL)	Sandy, Utah
7:30 PM MDT	Beckerman 3'; Álvarez (yellow card) 4'; Morales (yellow card) 68'; Sandoval 98'; Stephenson 101'; Grabavoy (yellow card) 117'	Report	Barrera (yellow card) 44'; Blanco (yellow card) 65'; Carr (yellow card) 80'; Gulley 87'; Cruz 120+1'	Stadium: Rio Tinto Stadium; Attendance: 9644; Referee: Younes Marrakchi (Colorado)

May 29, 2013	Charlotte Eagles (USL Pro)	0–2	Chicago Fire (MLS)	Rock Hill, South Carolina
7:00 PM EDT	Villaseñor (yellow card) 85'	Report	Magee 11'; Soumare (yellow card) 39'; Rolfe 57'	Stadium: Winthrop University Stadium; Attendance: 1562; Referee: Lance Jacob Vanhaitsma (Florida)

May 29, 2013	Columbus Crew (MLS)	2–1	Dayton Dutch Lions (USL Pro)	Columbus, Ohio
7:30 PM EDT	Gaven 52'; Gláuber (yellow card) 55'; Schoenfeld (yellow card) 76'; Meram 85'	Report	Granger (red card) 14'; Lord (yellow card) 37'; S. Smith 78'	Stadium: Columbus Crew Stadium; Attendance: 1302; Referee: Sorin Stoica (Ohio)

May 29, 2013	New York Red Bulls (MLS)	2–0	Reading United (PDL)	Harrison, New Jersey
7:30 PM EDT	Espindola 61'; Sam 67'; Holgersson (yellow card) 90'	Report	Sweat (yellow card) 90+4'	Stadium: Red Bull Arena; Attendance: 3867; Referee: Mark Gorak (Virginia)

May 29, 2013	Carolina RailHawks (NASL)	2–0	Los Angeles Galaxy (MLS)	Cary, North Carolina
7:15 PM EDT	Shipalane (yellow card) 43' da Luz 59'; Shriver 61'; Schilawski (yellow card) 83'	Report	Walker (yellow card) 44'	Stadium: WakeMed Soccer Park; Attendance: 8121; Referee: Daniel Fitzgerald (North Carolina)

May 29, 2013	Houston Dynamo (MLS)	2–0	FC Tucson (PDL)	Houston, Texas
7:30 PM CDT	Dixon 26'; Creavalle (yellow card) 71'; Barnes 85'	Report	Robinson (yellow card) 26'; Zimmerman (yellow card) 84'	Stadium: BBVA Compass Stadium; Attendance: 2,917; Referee: Elie Aguilar (Texas)

May 29, 2013	Tampa Bay Rowdies (NASL)	1–0	Seattle Sounders FC (MLS)	Saint Petersburg, Florida
7:30 PM EDT	Hristov 75'; Gafa (red card) 85'	Report	Caskey (yellow card) 52'; Martínez (yellow card) 90'	Stadium: Al Lang Stadium; Attendance: 4124; Referee: Cedric Adams (Florida)

May 29, 2013	Portland Timbers (MLS)	5–1	Wilmington Hammerheads (USL Pro)	Portland, Oregon
7:30 PM PDT	Piquionne 2', 17', 34', 45+2'; Danso 73'	Report	Parratt (yellow card) 6'; Wallace (yellow card) 58'; Nicholson 61'; Nicklaw (yellow card) 67'	Stadium: JELD-WEN Field; Attendance: 10,924; Referee: Alejandro Mariscal (California)

=== Fourth round ===
June 12, 2013	New England Revolution (MLS)	4–2	New York Red Bulls (MLS)	Boston, Massachusetts
7:30 PM EDT	Rowe 5', 37'; Imbongo 50'; Cissé (yellow card) 76'; Barnes (yellow card) 78'; Tierney 86'	Report	Barklage (yellow card) 10' (yellow-red card) 90+'; Espíndola (yellow card) 24'; Espíndola 30'; McCarty (yellow card) 45'; Holgersson (yellow card) 55'; Steele 61'	Stadium: Soldiers Field Soccer Stadium; Attendance: 2500; Referee: Matthew Foerster (Texas)

June 12, 2013	D.C. United (MLS)	3–1	Philadelphia Union (MLS)	Boyds, Maryland
7:00 PM EDT	De Rosario 24', 75', 85'	Report	Okugo (yellow card) 46'; Fernandes (yellow card) 56'; McInerney 76'	Stadium: Maryland SoccerPlex; Attendance: 3000; Referee: Kevin Terry, Jr. (Tennessee)

June 12, 2013	Sporting Kansas City (MLS)	0–1	Orlando City (USL Pro)	Kansas City, Kansas
7:30 PM CDT		Report	Tan 1'; Pulis (yellow card) 71'	Stadium: Sporting Park; Attendance: 15,981; Referee: Tyler Ploeger (Utah)

June 12, 2013	FC Dallas (MLS)	3–0	Houston Dynamo (MLS)	Frisco, Texas
8:00 PM CDT	Cooper 37', 59'; Castillo (yellow card) 67'; Loyd 76'	Report		Stadium: FC Dallas Stadium; Attendance: 4006; Referee: Juan Guzman (California)

June 12, 2013	Carolina RailHawks (NASL)	3–1 (a.e.t.)	Chivas USA (MLS)	Cary, North Carolina
7:15 PM EDT	Shipalane 13' da Luz (yellow card) 40'; Hamilton (yellow card) 71'; Elizondo 92'; Low (yellow card) 94'; Ackley 98'	Report	Soto (yellow card) 25'; Borja (yellow card) 37'; Alvarez 57'; Farfan (yellow card) 94'; Courtois (yellow card) 119'	Stadium: WakeMed Soccer Park; Attendance: 5066; Referee: Alejandro Mariscal (California)

June 12, 2013	Real Salt Lake (MLS)	5–2 (a.e.t.)	Charleston Battery (USL Pro)	Sandy, Utah
7:30 PM MDT	Sandoval 66', 97'; Plata 79' (pen.); Sandoval (yellow card) 92'; Stephenson; 105'; Morales 105+' (pen.)	Report	Kelly 15'; Paterson 18'; Paterson (yellow card) 56'; Azira (yellow card) 57'; Wilson (yellow card) 92'; Ellison (yellow card) 112'	Stadium: Rio Tinto Stadium; Attendance: 13,763; Referee: Jesus Cisneros (California)

June 12, 2013	Portland Timbers (MLS)	2–0	Tampa Bay Rowdies (NASL)	Portland, Oregon
7:30 PM PDT	Nanchoff 9'; Jewsbury 55'	Report	Hristov (yellow card) 43' (yellow-red card) 89'; Needham (yellow card) 45+'	Stadium: JELD-WEN Field; Attendance: 5931; Referee: Ismail Elfath (Texas)

June 13, 2013^{1}	Chicago Fire (MLS)	2–1	Columbus Crew (MLS)	Bridgeview, Illinois
12:00 PM CDT	Magee 28'; Magee (yellow card) 70'; Nyarko 77'; Nyarko (yellow card) 82'; Soumaré (yellow card) 90'	Report	Warzycha 22'; Warzycha (yellow card) 70'; Añor (yellow card) 90'	Stadium: Toyota Park; Attendance: 2006; Referee: Fotis Bazakos (Minnesota)

- ^{1} Game was postponed and moved to June 13 due to severe weather.

=== Quarterfinals ===
June 26, 2013	Chicago Fire (MLS)	5–1	Orlando City (USL Pro)	Bridgeview, Illinois
7:30 PM CDT	Rolfe 6', 63'; Alex (yellow card) 24'; Nyarko 59'; Segares (yellow card) 73'; Magee 83'; Lindpere 90'	Report	Duke (yellow card) 21'; Valentino 51'; Songo'o (red card) 71'; Burke (yellow card) 76'; Mbengue (red card) 86'	Stadium: Toyota Park; Attendance: 6,893; Referee: Sorin Stoica (Ohio)

June 26, 2013	D.C. United (MLS)	3–1	New England Revolution (MLS)	Boyds, Maryland
7:00 PM EDT	Pontius 45'; Riley (yellow card) 52'; De Rosario 69'; Pajoy 87' (pen.)	Report	Dorman (yellow card) 47'; Toja 52'; Imbongo (yellow card) 58'	Stadium: Maryland SoccerPlex; Referee: Edvin Jurisevic (Nebraska)

June 26, 2013	Real Salt Lake (MLS)	3–0	Carolina RailHawks (NASL)	Sandy, Utah
7:30 PM MDT	Beltran 35'; Wingert 51'; Saborío 86'	Report		Stadium: Rio Tinto Stadium; Attendance: 10,287; Referee: Fotis Bazakos (Minnesota)

June 26, 2013	FC Dallas (MLS)	2–3	Portland Timbers (MLS)	Frisco, Texas
8:00 PM CDT	Watson 14'; Jacobson (yellow card) 60'; Pérez 86'; John (yellow card) 90+'	Report	Kah (yellow card) 47'; Nagbe 61'; Valeri 63'; Piquionne 72'; W. Johnson (yellow card) 89'	Stadium: FC Dallas Stadium; Attendance: 3,889; Referee: Jose Carlos Rivero (New York)

=== Semifinals ===
August 7, 2013	Chicago Fire (MLS)	0–2	D.C. United (MLS)	Bridgeview, Illinois
7:30 PM CDT		Report	De Rosario 44'; DeLeon 48'	Stadium: Toyota Park; Attendance: 11,036; Referee: Jair Marrufo (Texas)

August 7, 2013	Real Salt Lake (MLS)	2–1	Portland Timbers (MLS)	Sandy, Utah
7:30 PM MDT	Saborio 7'; Salcedo (yellow card) 42'; Plata 78'	Report	R. Johnson (yellow card) 42'; Valeri 90+1'; Kah (yellow card) 90+4'	Stadium: Rio Tinto Stadium; Attendance: 14,742; Referee: Mark Geiger (New Jersey)

=== Final ===
October 1, 2013
7:00 PM MDT

Real Salt Lake (MLS)	0–1	D.C. United (MLS)
Beckerman (yellow card) 45+1'; Rimando (yellow card) 90'	Report	Riley (yellow card) 21'; Neal 45'; DeLeon (yellow card) 58'; Korb (yellow card) 80'

Rio Tinto Stadium, Sandy, Utah
Attendance: 17,608
Referee: Juan Guzman (California)

== Top goalscorers ==
Final standings as of October 1, 2013.

Rank	Scorer	Club	Goals
1	(Canada) Dwayne De Rosario	D.C. United	5
1	(Martinique) Frédéric Piquionne	Portland Timbers	5
3	(United States) Argjent Duka	Icon FC	4
3	(United States) David Geno	Seattle Sounders FC U-23	4
3	(Ghana) Kwadwo Poku	Georgia Revolution	4
3	(United States) Kelyn Rowe	New England Revolution	4
7	(United States) Dom Dwyer	Orlando City S.C.	3
7	(Bulgaria) Georgi Hristov	Tampa Bay Rowdies	3
7	(Germany) Hakan Ilhan	Carolina Dynamo	3
7	(United States) Mike Magee	Chicago Fire	3
7	(United States) Chris Rolfe	Chicago Fire	3
7	(United States) Devon Sandoval	Real Salt Lake	3
7	(United States) Gustavo Villalobos	FC Hasental	3

== See also ==
- Lamar Hunt U.S. Open Cup
