= 2012 PDL season =

USL Premier Development League
- Season: 2012
- Champions: Forest City London (1st Title)
- Regular Season Champions: Michigan Bucks (3rd Title)
- Matches: 584
- Goals: 1,702 (2.91 per match)
- Best player: (Brazil) Sullivan Silva Thunder Bay Chill
- Top goalscorer: (Jamaica) Deshorn Brown Reading United AC (Brazil) Sullivan Silva Thunder Bay Chill (13 Goals Each)
- Best goalkeeper: (United States) Gary Parsons Michigan Bucks
- Biggest home win: 2 tied: Austin Aztex 7–0 Texas Dutch Lions 24 May 2012; Austin Aztex 7–0 West Texas Sockers 6 July 2012
- Biggest away win: Ventura County Fusion 6–0 Fresno Fuego 31 May 2012
- Highest scoring: WSA Winnipeg 6–3 Springfield Demize 14 July 2012
- Longest winning run: 11 wins: Thunder Bay Chill
- Longest unbeaten run: 13 matches: 3 tied: Carolina Dynamo, Michigan Bucks, Ventura County Fusion
- Longest winless run: 16 matches: Fraser Valley Mariners
- Longest losing run: 13 losses: Fraser Valley Mariners
- Highest attendance: 8,174 Vancouver Whitecaps FC U-23 at Portland Timbers U23 1 June 2012
- Lowest attendance: 0 Michigan Bucks at Chicago Fire Premier 1 July 2012
- Average attendance: 487

The 2012 USL Premier Development League season was the 18th season of the PDL. The regular season began on 22 April with a match between the Los Angeles Misioneros and Fresno Fuego, and ended with 14 matches on 15 July 2012. The regular season was followed by a postseason tournament of conference winners which determined the league's champion, Forest City London. Thirteen teams were added to the league and four teams dropped, bringing the total number of teams to 73 across nine divisions for 2012.

== Changes from 2011 ==
=== Name changes ===
- Abbotsford Mariners rebranded as Fraser Valley Mariners
- Central Florida Kraze rebranded as Orlando City U-23 after its acquisition by USL Pro team Orlando City
- Chivas El Paso Patriots rebranded as El Paso Patriots.
- Los Angeles Blues 23 rebranded as Pali Blues
- MPS Portland Phoenix rebranded as GPS Portland Phoenix
- New Hampshire Phantoms rebranded as Seacoast United Phantoms
- Tacoma Tide rebranded as Seattle Sounders FC U-23 after its acquisition by Major League Soccer team Seattle Sounders FC.
- West Texas United Sockers rebranded as West Texas Sockers

=== New teams ===
Thirteen new clubs joined the PDL this coming season.

Team name	Metro area	Location	Previous affiliation
(Texas) Austin Aztex	Greater Austin	Austin, Texas	expansion
(Maryland) Baltimore Bohemians	Baltimore area	Bel Air, Maryland	expansion
(Massachusetts) Boston Victory	Metropolitan Boston	Quincy, Massachusetts	expansion
(Illinois) Chicago Inferno	Chicago area	Chicago, Illinois	expansion
Connecticut FC Azul	Connecticut	Hamden, Connecticut	USASA
(Florida) Ocala Stampede	Ocala, Florida	Ocala, Florida	expansion
(South Carolina) Palmetto FC Bantams	Greenwood, South Carolina	Greenwood, South Carolina	expansion
(Florida) Panama City Beach Pirates	Panama City	Panama City Beach, Florida	expansion
Southern West Virginia King's Warriors	Raleigh County	Beckley, West Virginia	expansion
Texas Dutch Lions	Greater Houston	Holland, Texas	expansion
(Arizona) FC Tucson	Pima County	Tucson, Arizona	USASA
(Florida) VSI Tampa Flames	Tampa Bay Area	Tampa, Florida	expansion
(Massachusetts) Worcester Hydra	Worcester, Massachusetts	Worcester, Massachusetts	expansion

=== Realignment ===
The Nashville Metros were moved from the Southeast Division of the Southern Conference to the South Atlantic Division of the Eastern Conference.

=== Folding/moving ===
- Four teams were announced as leaving the league prior to the beginning of the season:
  - Akron Summit Assault – Akron, Ohio
  - Baton Rouge Capitals – Baton Rouge, Louisiana
  - Indiana Invaders – South Bend, Indiana
  - Rio Grande Valley Grandes – McAllen, Texas

== Standings ==
2012 Premier Development League standings.

Key to colours in group tables
Team won the Division Title
Team qualified for playoff berth

Note: The first tie-breaker in PDL standings is head-to-head results between teams tied on points, which is why some teams with inferior goal differences finish ahead in the standings.

=== Central Conference ===
==== Great Lakes Division ====
Pos	Team	Pld	W	L	T	GF	GA	GD	Pts
1	Michigan Bucks (R)	16	13	1	2	46	10	+36	41
2	Forest City London	16	7	5	4	28	21	+7	25
3	River City Rovers	16	7	7	2	24	32	−8	23 (Note: Although River City Rovers qualified for post season play, they ceded the match that was to be played 7/17 to Forest City London.)
4	Cincinnati Kings	16	6	7	3	28	33	−5	21
5	Chicago Fire Premier	16	6	7	3	22	26	−4	21
6	Toronto Lynx	16	6	8	2	22	25	−3	20
7	Hamilton Rage	16	4	9	3	23	35	−12	15
8	Chicago Inferno	16	4	9	3	21	32	−11	15

(R) Regular Season Champions

==== Heartland Division ====
Pos	Team	Pld	W	L	T	GF	GA	GD	Pts
1	Thunder Bay Chill	16	13	2	1	41	10	+31	40
2	Real Colorado Foxes	16	8	4	4	19	19	0	28
3	Des Moines Menace	16	8	5	3	30	22	+8	27
4	Springfield Demize	16	5	7	4	23	29	−6	19
5	Kansas City Brass	16	6	9	1	30	31	−1	19
6	WSA Winnipeg	16	3	8	5	15	28	−13	14
7	St. Louis Lions	16	3	11	2	16	35	−19	11

=== Eastern Conference ===
==== Mid Atlantic Division ====
Pos	Team	Pld	W	L	T	GF	GA	GD	Pts
1	Ocean City Nor'easters	16	13	3	0	36	13	+23	39
2	Reading United	16	11	2	3	33	11	+22	36
3	Jersey Express	16	10	3	3	33	16	+17	33
4	New Jersey Rangers	16	8	5	3	28	25	+3	27
5	Long Island Rough Riders	16	6	7	3	26	22	+4	21
6	Baltimore Bohemians	16	5	7	4	20	24	−4	19
7	Brooklyn Knights	16	5	9	2	31	37	−6	17
8	Central Jersey Spartans	16	4	10	2	13	31	−18	14
9	Bermuda Hogges	16	4	10	2	17	38	−21	14
10	Westchester Flames	16	2	12	2	20	40	−20	8

==== Northeast Division ====
Pos	Team	Pld	W	L	T	GF	GA	GD	Pts
1	Ottawa Fury	16	10	3	3	30	14	+16	33
2	GPS Portland Phoenix	16	10	4	2	29	17	+12	32
3	Western Mass Pioneers	16	6	4	6	18	11	+7	24
4	Worcester Hydra	16	6	5	5	23	19	+4	23
5	Connecticut FC Azul	16	6	5	5	24	14	+10	23
6	Seacoast United Phantoms	16	5	6	5	14	20	−6	20
7	Vermont Voltage	16	3	11	2	21	34	−13	11
8	Boston Victory	16	3	11	2	6	36	−30	11

==== South Atlantic Division ====
Pos	Team	Pld	W	L	T	GF	GA	GD	Pts
1	Carolina Dynamo	16	11	1	4	37	10	+27	37
2	Real Maryland Monarchs	16	8	4	4	33	22	+11	28
3	West Virginia Chaos	16	8	5	3	22	22	0	27
4	Nashville Metros	16	7	6	3	24	15	+9	24
5	Fredericksburg Hotspur	16	6	8	2	23	34	−11	20
6	Palmetto FC Bantams	16	4	5	7	16	18	−2	19
7	Northern Virginia Royals	16	5	7	4	14	23	−9	19
8	King's Warriors	16	4	10	2	17	24	−7	14
9	Virginia Beach Piranhas	16	3	10	3	16	34	−18	12

=== Southern Conference ===
==== Mid South Division ====
Pos	Team	Pld	W	L	T	GF	GA	GD	Pts
1	Laredo Heat	16	10	3	3	31	15	+16	33
2	Austin Aztex	16	9	5	2	40	13	+27	29
3	El Paso Patriots	16	7	7	2	26	24	+2	23
4	Texas Dutch Lions	16	5	9	2	22	47	−25	17
5	New Orleans Jesters	16	3	6	7	26	34	−8	16
6	West Texas Sockers	16	3	7	6	18	30	−12	15

==== Southeast Division ====
Pos	Team	Pld	W	L	T	GF	GA	GD	Pts
1	Ocala Stampede	16	11	3	2	35	20	+15	35
2	Orlando City U-23	16	8	3	5	31	17	+14	29
3	Bradenton Academics	16	8	6	2	23	14	+9	26
4	Mississippi Brilla	16	8	7	1	32	25	+7	25
5	VSI Tampa Flames	16	7	5	4	23	20	+3	25
6	Panama City Beach Pirates	16	6	7	3	19	19	0	21
7	Fort Lauderdale Schulz Academy	16	3	10	3	10	39	−29	12
8	FC JAX Destroyers	16	1	11	4	17	36	−19	7

=== Western Conference ===
==== Northwest Division ====
Pos	Team	Pld	W	L	T	GF	GA	GD	Pts
1	Seattle Sounders FC U-23	16	11	2	3	33	17	+16	36
2	Portland Timbers U23's	16	10	4	2	35	16	+19	32
3	Kitsap Pumas	16	10	4	2	29	18	+11	32
4	Washington Crossfire	16	8	7	1	17	21	−4	25
5	Vancouver Whitecaps FC U-23 (J)	16	7	6	3	35	20	+15	24
6	Victoria Highlanders	16	6	6	4	21	18	+3	22
7	North Sound SeaWolves	16	4	12	0	16	40	−24	12
8	Fraser Valley Mariners	16	0	15	1	4	40	−36	1

(J) Juan de Fuca Plate

==== Southwest Division ====
Pos	Team	Pld	W	L	T	GF	GA	GD	Pts
1	Ventura County Fusion	16	12	2	2	42	13	+29	38
2	FC Tucson	16	9	3	4	21	16	+5	31
3	Fresno Fuego	16	8	5	3	28	24	+4	27
4	Los Angeles Misioneros	16	5	4	7	29	23	+6	22
5	Ogden Outlaws	16	6	7	3	21	27	−6	21
6	BYU Cougars	16	6	8	2	27	25	+2	20
7	Orange County Blue Star	16	5	6	5	30	26	+4	20
8	Southern California Seahorses	16	3	10	3	21	36	−15	12
9	Pali Blues	16	2	11	3	16	45	−29	9

== Conference Championships ==
As in prior years, each of the four conferences will hold a conference championship. In 2012, the location for each conference championship will be held the weekend of 20–22 July with the host team decided by a bidding process with preference given to the teams with the best records. The winner of the four conference championships will then compete in the PDL Championship held 27–29 July and 4 August.

=== Divisional Playoffs ===
Five of the divisions have additional matches in order for teams to qualify for the conference championship.

In the Great Lakes Division the 2nd and 3rd place teams qualify for a play in match; however, the 3rd place River City Rovers ceded the match to Forest City London who qualified for the Central Conference Championship.

In the Northwest Division, the top 4 teams qualify for a play-in match with the #4 seed playing at the home pitch of the top seed; and the #3 seed playing at the #2 seed. The winners of these matches then qualify for the Western Conference Championships. These matches were played on 7/14 and 7/15 with Seattle Sounders and Portland Timbers U-23 teams winning.

Northwest Division; Western Conference
NW1	Seattle Sounders FC U-23	3
NW4	Washington Crossfire	1

Northwest Division; Western Conference
NW2	Portland Timbers U23's	2
NW3	Kitsap Pumas	1

In the Eastern Conference, there are three divisions. The team with the best overall record in the conference qualifies for the Conference Championships directly, and, from that team's division, the 2nd and 3rd place teams compete in a play-in match. In 2012, Ocean City from the Mid Atlantic Division had the best overall all record. Therefore, 3rd place Jersey Expressed traveled to 2nd place Reading United on 17 July to determine the 2nd team from the Mid Atlantic that would qualify for the Conference Championships. Reading United won the match 3–1 with an extra time goal scored in the 119th minute and a penalty goal in stoppage time.

The top two teams from the other two divisions will also compete in a play-in match. In the Northeast Division, the Ottawa Fury hosted the GPS Portland Phoenix on 17 July with Ottawa claiming victory after extra time 3–2. The Carolina Dynamo hosted the Real Maryland Monarchs in the South Atlantic play-in match, with Carolina easily cruising to a 5–0 victory. The Eastern Conference Championships which will be hosted by Carolina Dynamo.

Northeast Division; Eastern Conference
NE1	Ottawa Fury	3
NE2	GPS Portland Phoenix	2

Mid Atlantic Division; Eastern Conference
MA2	Reading United	3
MA3	Jersey Express	1

South Atlantic Division; Eastern Conference
SA1	Carolina Dynamo	5
SA2	Real Maryland FC	0

14 July 2012	(Washington (state)) Seattle Sounders FC U-23	3–1	(Washington (state)) Washington Crossfire	Franklin Pierce High School; Tacoma, WA
7:00PM PDT	DeLeon 10', 36'; Sanchez 79' (yellow card) 79'	Report	Fisk (yellow card) 25'; Sanchez (yellow card) 39'; Besagno (yellow card) 47'; McCluskey 54' (o.g.)	Attendance: 213

15 July 2012	(Oregon) Portland Timbers U23's	2–1	(Washington (state)) Kitsap Pumas	Gladstone High School; Gladstone, OR
7:00PM EDT	Sherrod 2'; Ribeiro (yellow card) 62'; Farfan 69'	Report	Sampson 7' (yellow card) 70'; Johnson (yellow card) 56'; Medina (yellow card) 58'	Attendance: 1,052; Referee: Farhad Dadko

17 July 2012	(Ontario) Ottawa Fury	3–2 (a.e.t.)	(Maine) GPS Portland Phoenix	Algonquin College Soccer Complex; Ottawa, ON
7:00PM EDT	Basso (yellow card) 33'; Campbell 66'; Beauge 105' (pen.); Rodriguez 106'	Report	Woodruff (yellow card) 30' (goal) 120+'; Anderson 87'; Dietriech (yellow card) 113'; Massie (yellow card) 113'	Attendance: 265; Referee: Marvin Mohring

17 July 2012	(Pennsylvania) Reading United	3–1 (a.e.t.)	(New Jersey) Jersey Express	Shirk Stadium; Reading, PA
7:00PM EDT	Christianson 39'; Raj (yellow card) 102' (yellow-red card) 110'; Marini 119'; Okai 120' (pen.); Wyatt (yellow card) 120'	Report	Niouky (yellow card) 27' (yellow-red card) 119'; N'Guessan (yellow card) 57'; Keegan 75'; Hines (yellow card) 80'; Foster (yellow card) 104'; Watson (yellow card) 107'	Attendance: 316; Referee: Ryan Dos Reis

17 July 2012	(North Carolina) Carolina Dynamo	5–0	Real Maryland FC	Macpherson Stadium; Browns Summit, NC
7:00PM EDT	Ilhan 15'; Malcolm 26'; McCready 31'; Smith 69', 77'; S. Ibeagha (yellow card) 84'	Report	Andrews (yellow card) 65'; Forbess (yellow card) 78'	Attendance: 1,589; Referee: Daniel Fitzgerald

=== Eastern Conference Championship ===
21 July 2012	(New Jersey) Ocean City Nor'easters	0–1	(Ontario) Ottawa Fury	Macpherson Stadium; Browns Summit, NC
4:00PM EDT	Tweneboa (yellow card) 33'; Davis (yellow card) 34'	Report	Campbell 6'; Curran (yellow card) 57'	Attendance: 4,000; Referee: Brandon Marion

21 July 2012	(North Carolina) Carolina Dynamo	1–1 (a.e.t.) (8–7 p)	(Pennsylvania) Reading United	Macpherson Stadium; Browns Summit, NC
7:00PM EDT	Simonin (yellow card) 22'; Ilhan 32'; Smith (yellow card) 54'	Report	Wyatt (yellow card) 11'; Rodriguez 88'; Christianson (red card) 81'	Attendance: 1,938; Referee: Jordan Smith
	Penalties
	McCready (penalty missed); Sloan (penalty missed); Nyepon (penalty scored); Reittinger (penalty scored); Gomez (penalty scored); Reifschneider (penalty scored); S. Ibeagha (penalty scored); Root (penalty scored); Dunker (penalty scored); Ford (penalty scored)		(penalty scored) Peckham; (penalty scored) Neumann; (penalty scored) Cardona; (penalty missed) Farfan; (penalty missed) Cochrane; (penalty scored) Wyatt; (penalty scored) Baker; (penalty scored) McCarthy; (penalty scored) Rodriguez; (penalty missed) Martin

22 July 2012	(North Carolina) Carolina Dynamo	1–0	(Ontario) Ottawa Fury	Macpherson Stadium; Browns Summit, NC
6:00PM EDT	Smith (yellow card) 46'; Reifschneider (yellow card) 76'; S. Ibeagha (yellow card) 88' (goal) 90'; Dunker (yellow card) 88'	Report	Beattie (yellow card) 51'; Castro (yellow card) 56'; Crick (red card) 65'	Referee: Matt Jocaitis

=== Central Conference Championship ===
21 July 2012	Michigan Bucks	1–0	Real Colorado Foxes	Ultimate Soccer Arenas; Pontiac, MI
6:00PM EDT	Crnkić 31'	Report	Donaldson (yellow card) 62'; Schaffe (yellow card) 70'; Tapphorn (yellow card) 89'	Attendance: 814; Referee: Artm Sher

21 July 2012	(Ontario) Thunder Bay Chill	0–1	(Ontario) Forest City London	Ultimate Soccer Arenas; Pontiac, MI
8:00PM EDT	Neto (yellow card) 74' (yellow-red card) 76'	Report	Ayris 62'; Lange (yellow card) 85'	Attendance: 814; Referee: Margaret Domka

22 July 2012	Michigan Bucks	1–2	(Ontario) Forest City London	Ultimate Soccer Arenas; Pontiac, MI
6:00PM EDT	St. Louis (yellow card) 17'; Boyden (yellow card) 64'; Catalano 73'; Grant (yellow card) 79'	Report	Ayris 21'; Lange 67'; Da Cruz (yellow card) 88'	Attendance: 781; Referee: Connor Williams

=== Southern Conference Championship ===
20 July 2012	(Texas) Laredo Heat	1–2	(Florida) Orlando City U-23	Trinity Catholic High School; Ocala, FL
5:30PM EDT	Frias (yellow card) 30'; Moreno (yellow card) 30'; Ibarra (red card) 40'; Vallejo 53' (pen.)	Report	Russo 29'; Helm (yellow card) 32' (goal) 49'; Reynolds (yellow card) 44'; Toby (yellow card) 55'; Aduny (yellow card) 72'	Attendance: 905; Referee: Josh Thompson

20 July 2012	(Florida) Ocala Stampede	2–3	(Texas) Austin Aztex	Trinity Catholic High School; Ocala, FL
8:00PM EDT	Diaz (yellow card) 37' dos Santos 45'; De Oliveira 54'	Report	Shelton 14' (yellow card) 38'; Manneh 36', 70'; Cook (yellow card) 45'	Attendance: 905; Referee: Agostino Minsola

22 July 2012	(Florida) Orlando City U-23	4–2	(Texas) Austin Aztex	Trinity Catholic High School; Ocala, FL
5:00PM EDT	Helm 13'; MacDonald (yellow card) 23'; Toby (yellow card) 35'; Reynolds 45+1'; Fairhurst 80'; Aduny 90+5'	Report	Manneh 11' (pen.); Pope (yellow card) 26'; Shelton 90+2'	Attendance: 155; Referee: Rob Mauws

=== Western Conference Championship ===
21 July 2012	(California) Ventura County Fusion	1–0 (a.e.t.)	(Oregon) Portland Timbers U23's	Ventura College; Ventura, CA
5:00PM PDT	Muñoz 93'	Report	Granger (yellow card) 41'	Attendance: 1,527; Referee: Reed Christy

21 July 2012	(Washington (state)) Seattle Sounders FC U-23	2–1	(Arizona) FC Tucson	Ventura College; Ventura, CA
7:30PM PDT	Monge (yellow card) 24'; Jones 55'; Morris 64'; Quinn (yellow card) 65'	Report	Toia 47'; McQuown (yellow card) 88'	Attendance: 1,100; Referee: Robert Sarfaraz

22 July 2012	(California) Ventura County Fusion	0–2	(Washington (state)) Seattle Sounders FC U-23	Ventura College; Ventura, CA
5:00PM PDT	Daly (yellow card) 7'; Pontius (yellow card) 7'; McGlynn (yellow card) 90'	Report	Jones 58'; Cox 81' (yellow card) 83'	Attendance: 1,088; Referee: Magic Berenji

== Bracket ==
Conference Semifinals (20–21 July)
SE1	Ocala Stampede	2
MS2	Austin Aztex	3
Southern Conference
MS1	Laredo Heat	1
SE2	Orlando City U-23	2
MA1	Ocean City Nor'easters	0
NE1	Ottawa Fury	1
Eastern Conference
SA1	Carolina Dynamo (AET)	2
MA2	Reading United	1
SW1	Ventura County Fusion (AET)	1
NW2	Portland Timbers U23's	0
Western Conference
NW1	Seattle Sounders FC U-23	2
SW2	FC Tucson	1
GL1	Michigan Bucks	1
HL2	Real Colorado Foxes	0
Central Conference
HL1	Thunder Bay Chill	0
GL2	Forest City London	1

Conference Finals (22 July)
MS2	Austin Aztex	2
SE2	Orlando City U-23	4
NE1	Ottawa Fury	0
SA1	Carolina Dynamo	1
SW1	Ventura County Fusion	0
NW1	Seattle Sounders FC U-23	2
GL1	Michigan Bucks	1
GL2	Forest City London	2

Semi-Finals (28 July)
SE2	Orlando City U-23	1
SA1	Carolina Dynamo	2
NW1	Seattle Sounders FC U-23	2
GL2	Forest City London	3

Championship (4 August)
SA1	Carolina Dynamo	1
GL2	Forest City London	2

== PDL Championship ==
The 2012 PDL Championship consisted of 4 teams, the winner of each Conference Championship, with the semi-finals being held on Saturday, 28 July and the finals being played Saturday, 4 August. The host sites were determined following the completion of the Conference Championships.

=== Semi-finals ===
28 July 2012	(North Carolina) Carolina Dynamo	2–1	(Florida) Orlando City U-23	Macpherson Stadium; Browns Summit, NC
7:00PM EDT	Smith 34'; Sloan 43'	Report	Russo 24'; Fairhurst (yellow card) 39'; Graydon (yellow card) 90'	Attendance: 2,801; Referee: Kai Goodrinch

28 July 2012	(Ontario) Forest City London	3–2	(Washington (state)) Seattle Sounders FC U-23	German Club; London, ON
7:30PM EDT	Spearman (yellow card) 45'; Haworth 46'; Da Cruz 51'; Ayris (yellow card) 76'; Lewis 83'	Report	Morris 21' (yellow card) 44'; Yedlin (yellow card) 24' Sanchez 34'	Attendance: 2,500; Referee: Arthur Korbiel

=== Championship ===
4 August 2012	(North Carolina) Carolina Dynamo	1–2	(Ontario) Forest City London	Macpherson Stadium; Browns Summit, NC
7:00PM EDT	Smith 26'; Okwuonu (yellow card) 75'; Nyepon (yellow card) 90'	Report; Report; Report; Report	Haworth 31'; Ayris (yellow card) 57' (goal) 76'	Attendance: 4,301; Referee: Mark Goralz

Championship MVP: (England) Jordan Ayris (FCL)

== Awards ==
- Most Valuable Player: (Brazil) Sullivan Silva, (THU)
- Rookie of the Year: (United States) Adam Grinwis, (MIB)
- Defender of the Year: (United States) Kevin Cope, (MIB)
- Coach of the Year: (United States) Gary Parsons, (MIB)
- Goalkeeper of the Year: (United States) Adam Grinwis, (MIB)

== All-League and All-Conference Teams ==
=== Eastern Conference ===
F: (Jamaica) Deshorn Brown (REA) *, (Brazil) Alencar Junior (WOR), (United States) David Neuberth (RMD)
M: (United States) Christian Barreiro (BAL), (England) Jason Massie (GPS), (Ghana) Stephen Okai (REA)
D: (United States) Patrick Boucher (CON), (Brazil) Marcello Castro (OTT), (United States) Greg Cochrane (REA), (United States) Sebastien Ibeagha (CAR) *
G: (United States) John McCarthy (OCN)

=== Central Conference ===
F: (England) Jordan Ayris (LON), (Brazil) Sullivan Silva (THU) *, (United States) Branden Stelmak (CIN)
M: (United States) Tom Catalano (MIB) *, (United States) Bryan Ciesiulka (CHI), (United States) Jordan Green (KCB) *
D: Sicelo Buthelezi (THU), (United States) Kevin Cope (MIB) *, (Jamaica) Lorne Donaldson (RCO), (United States) Peter Nechvatal (KCB)
G: (United States) Adam Grinwis (MIB) *

=== Western Conference ===
F: (United States) Jaime Chavez (LAM), (United States) Mark Sherrod (POR) *, (United States) Gyasi Zardes (VCF)
M: (Canada) Ben Fisk (VAN), (United States) Matt Friesen (KIT) *, (United States) Frankie López (VCF)
D: (Canada) James Farenhorst (VAN), (United States) Stephen Mohn (KIT), (United States) Conor Spence (TUC), (United States) DeAndre Yedlin (SEA) *
G: (Canada) Elliott Mitrou (VIC)

=== Southern Conference ===
F: (The Gambia) Karamba Janneh (OCA), (Kenya) Chrispin Ochieng (MIS), (United States) Kris Tyrpak (AUS)
M: (Mexico) Juan de Dios Ibarra-Trevino (LAR), (Brazil) Douglas dos Santos (OCA), (The Gambia) Kekuta Manneh (AUS)
D: (Brazil) Taian de Souza (PAN), (Senegal) Oumar Diakhite (ORL), (United States) Max Gunderson (LAR) *, (United States) Zack Pope (AUS)
G: (Mexico) Alonso Jiménez (WTX)

* denotes All-League player
