= VSI Tampa Bay FC (PDL) =

- Full name: VisionPro Sports Institute Tampa Bay Football Club
- Nickname: Flames
- Founded: 2011
- Dissolved: 2013
- Ground: Plant City Stadium; Plant City, Florida
- Capacity: 6,700
- General Manager: (United States) Alex Miranda
- Head Coach: (Trinidad and Tobago) Sheldon Cipriani
- League: USL Premier Development League
- 2013: 4th, Southeast Division; Playoffs: DNQ
- Website: http://www.vsi-fc.com/
Home colors	Away colors

VSI Tampa Bay FC was an American soccer team based in Plant City, Florida that played in the USL Premier Development League (PDL), the fourth tier of the American soccer pyramid, from 2012 to 2013. The team was owned by VisionPro Sports Institute and was affiliated with the VSI Tampa Bay FC professional men's team in the USL Pro, the VSI Tampa Bay FC women's team in the W-League, and the youth team in the Super-20 League. All the teams were disbanded in 2013.

== History ==
The VSI Tampa Flames were established in 2011 as part of a broader move by the English football development academy, VisionPro Sports Institute, to build a foundation for youth and professional soccer in the United States. VSI partnered with the local Brandon, Florida area youth soccer organization, West Florida Flames, to build "the perfect platform for vertical progression, giving talented youngsters the opportunity to progress from junior soccer all the way through to the professional game," according to VSI's CEO, Simon Crane.

The USL PDL Team started play in 2012. The PDL Team finished with a record of 7 Wins, 5 Losses and 4 Ties. The team played their matches at JC Handly Sports Complex. In 2013, the team played their home matches at Plant City Stadium.

On November 22, 2012, the team's parent club changed its name to "VSI Tampa Bay FC" and the PDL Team followed suit. The team folded after the 2013 season.

== Players and Staff ==
=== Current roster ===
As of July 15, 2013 Note: Flags indicate national team as defined under FIFA eligibility rules; some limited exceptions apply. Players may hold more than one non-FIFA nationality.

No.	Pos.	Nation	Player
0	GK	USA	Steven Bush
1	GK	USA	Eric Osswald
2	MF	USA	Cooper Vandermaas-Peeler
3	MF	CAN	Berian Gobeil Cruz
5	MF	USA	Raul Garcia
6	MF	USA	Christian Blandon
7	MF	USA	Glen Long
29	DF	NGA	Kennedy Ihenacho
9	DF	ENG	Jamie McGuinness
10	FW	BRA	Carlos Magno Tenorio de Araujo
12	MF	USA	Eusebio Montoya
13	DF	USA	Jonathan Koshko
14	MF	ENG	Kyle Nicholls

No.	Pos.	Nation	Player
15	MF	USA	Sebastien Thuriere
16	DF	USA	Deion Jones
17	FW	SCO	Kenneth Hogg
18	DF	ENG	Matthew Duffy
19	MF	USA	Ryan Asare-Bediako
20	DF	USA	Nathan Diehl
21	MF	USA	Shane Wixted
22	DF	USA	Ben Sweat
23	DF	USA	Michael Panter
24	MF	USA	Josh Garbee
26	DF	USA	Wayne Cameron "Cam" Roberts
00	GK	ATG	Brentton Muhammad

=== Staff ===
- (United States) John Mitchell – Head of Operations
- (United States) Alex Miranda – General Manager
- (Trinidad and Tobago) Sheldon Cipriani – Head Coach
- (England) Sam Mitchell – Assistant Coach

== Record ==
=== Year-by-year ===
Year	Division	League	Regular season	Playoffs	U.S. Open Cup
2012	4	USL PDL	5th, Southeast Division	Did not qualify	Did not qualify
2013	4	USL PDL	4th, Southeast Division	Did not qualify	Did not qualify
