= Douglas Santos =

Douglas Santos or Douglas dos Santos may refer to:

- Douglas (footballer, born 1985) (Douglas Marques dos Santos), Brazilian footballer
- Douglas (footballer, born August 1990) (Douglas Pereira dos Santos), Brazilian footballer
- Douglas Santos (footballer, born 1994) (Douglas dos Santos Justino de Melo), Brazilian footballer
- Douglas (footballer, born 1982) (Douglas dos Santos), Brazilian footballer
- Douglas dos Santos (footballer, born 1991) (Douglas Gonçalves dos Santos), Brazilian footballer
