= VSI Tampa Bay FC (W-League) =

- Full name: VisionPro Sports Institute Tampa Bay Football Club
- Nickname: Flames
- Founded: 2011
- Dissolved: 2013
- Ground: Plant City Stadium; Plant City, Florida
- Capacity: 6,700
- General Manager: (United States) Alex Miranda
- Head Coach: (United States) George Fotopoulos
- League: USL W-League
- 2013: 5th, Southeast Division
- Website: http://www.vsi-flames.com/index.php/usl-w-league
Home colors	Away colors

VSI Tampa Bay FC was an American women's soccer team based in Plant City, Florida, that played in the United Soccer Leagues USL W-League from 2012 to 2013. The team was owned by VisionPro Sports Institute and was affiliated with the VSI Tampa Bay FC professional men's team in USL Pro, the VSI Tampa Bay FC amateur men's team in the USL Premier Development League (PDL), and the youth team in the Super-20 League. All the teams folded after the 2013 season.

== History ==
The VSI Tampa Flames were established in 2011 as part of a broader move by the English football development academy, VisionPro Sports Institute, to build a foundation for youth and professional soccer in the United States. VSI partnered with the local Brandon, Florida, area youth soccer organization, West Florida Flames, to build "the perfect platform for vertical progression, giving talented youngsters the opportunity to progress from junior soccer all the way through to the professional game," according to VSI's CEO, Simon Crane.

The USL W-League Team started play in 2012. The PDL Team finished with a record of 3 Wins, 7 Losses and 2 Ties. The team played their matches at JC Handly Sports Complex.

On November 22, 2012, the team's parent club changed its name to "VSI Tampa Bay FC" and the W-League team followed suit. The team folded after the 2013 season.

== Record ==
=== Year-by-year ===
Year	Division	League	Regular season	Playoffs
2012	4	W-League	4th, Southeast Division	Did not qualify
2013	4	W-League	5th, Southeast Division	Did not qualify
