= Christian Silva (soccer, born 1989) =

American soccer player (born 1989)

Personal information
- Date of birth: August 2, 1989 (age 37)
- Place of birth: North Bergen, New Jersey, United States
- Height: 5 ft 11 in (1.80 m)
- Position: Defensive midfielder

College career
Years	Team	Apps	(Gls)
2007–2008	Tampa Spartans		
2009–2011	South Florida Bulls		

Senior career*
Years	Team	Apps	(Gls)
2012	Ocala Stampede	8	(0)
2013	VSI Tampa Bay	1	(0)
2014	Karlstad BK	12	(2)
2015	Rochester Rhinos	5	(0)
2016	Orange County Blues	5	(0)
2016	Arizona United	9	(0)
2018	Jacksonville Armada	10	(1)
2019	Lansing Ignite	8	(0)
- * Club domestic league appearances and goals as of October 14, 2019

Christian Silva (born August 2, 1989) is an American soccer player.

== Career ==
=== College and amateur ===
Silva played one season at the University of Tampa before transferring to the University of South Florida. Silva forwent his final year of collegiate eligibility.

In Germany, Silva attracted the attention of Hannover 96, Dieter Schatzschneider. Trial for Hannover 96 U-23, coached by Andreas Bergmann. Bergmann decided to keep Silva until the winter pause of the 2011–2012 Regionalliga Nord season. Valérien Ismaël was soon after appointed head coach and did not offer Silva a contract. SV Werder Bremen U-23 trial in January 2012.

Silva also appeared for USL PDL club Ocala Stampede in 2012 before suffering a MCL tear.

=== Professional ===
Silva signed with USL Pro club VSI Tampa Bay FC in 2013, the club folded at the end of the 2013 season.

In 2014, he moved to Swedish side Karlstad BK where he played 12 matches and contributed two goals during his time with the club.

Silva signed with United Soccer League side Rochester Rhinos on March 24, 2015. He suffered an ACL tear on May 20, 2015, while playing in the first round of U.S. Open Cup and was forced to miss the remainder of the season where the Rhinos would go on to win the USL Championship.

In January 2016, United Soccer League side Orange County Blues FC announced the signing of Silva. In 2016 Silva completed a transfer to United Soccer League side Arizona United, and then to Jacksonville Armada FC in 2018.
