= 2013 Dayton Dutch Lions season =

The 2013 Dayton Dutch Lions season was the club's fourth season of existence, and third consecutive season of playing in the third division of American soccer. The club played in USL Pro.

== Competitions ==
=== USL Pro ===
==== Table ====
Pos	Team	Pld	W	T	L	GF	GA	GD	Pts	Qualification
6	Los Angeles Blues (A)	26	11	7	8	52	37	+15	40	Playoffs
7	Pittsburgh Riverhounds (A)	26	10	8	8	36	33	+3	38	Playoffs
8	Dayton Dutch Lions (A)	26	10	7	9	43	46	−3	37	Playoffs
9	Wilmington Hammerheads	26	11	4	11	35	39	−4	36 (Note: Wilmington were deducted one point for fielding an ineligible player on July 21 against Pittsburgh.)	
10	VSI Tampa Bay	26	9	5	12	41	39	+2	32	

Source: USL Pro official standings
Rules for classification: 1) points; 2) goal difference; 3) number of goals scored.
(A) Advances to USL Pro Playoffs
