= Antonio Neto =

Antonio Neto may refer to:

== Academics ==
- Antonio H. Castro Neto (born 1964), Brazilian physicist

== Politicians ==
- Antônio de Sousa Neto (1801-1866), Brazilian abolitionist
- António Lino Neto (1873-1961), Portuguese politician
- António Agostinho Neto (1922-1979), 1st President of Angola
- António Alberto Neto (born 1943), Angolan politician
- ACM Neto (born 1979), Brazilian politician

== Sportspeople ==
=== Association football ===
- Antônio Mattar Neto (born 1944), Brazilian football midfielder
- António Neto (footballer, born 1971), Angolan football defender
- Antonio Carlos da Silva Neto (born 1985), Brazilian football forward
- Antonio Neto (footballer, born 1989), Brazilian football midfielder

=== Other sports ===
- Antônio Braga Neto (born 1987), Brazilian martial artist

== See also ==
- Tufy Pina (born 1989), full name Antonio Pereira Pina Neto, Brazilian football midfielder
