= Bitielo Jean Jacques =

Haitian footballer (born 1990)

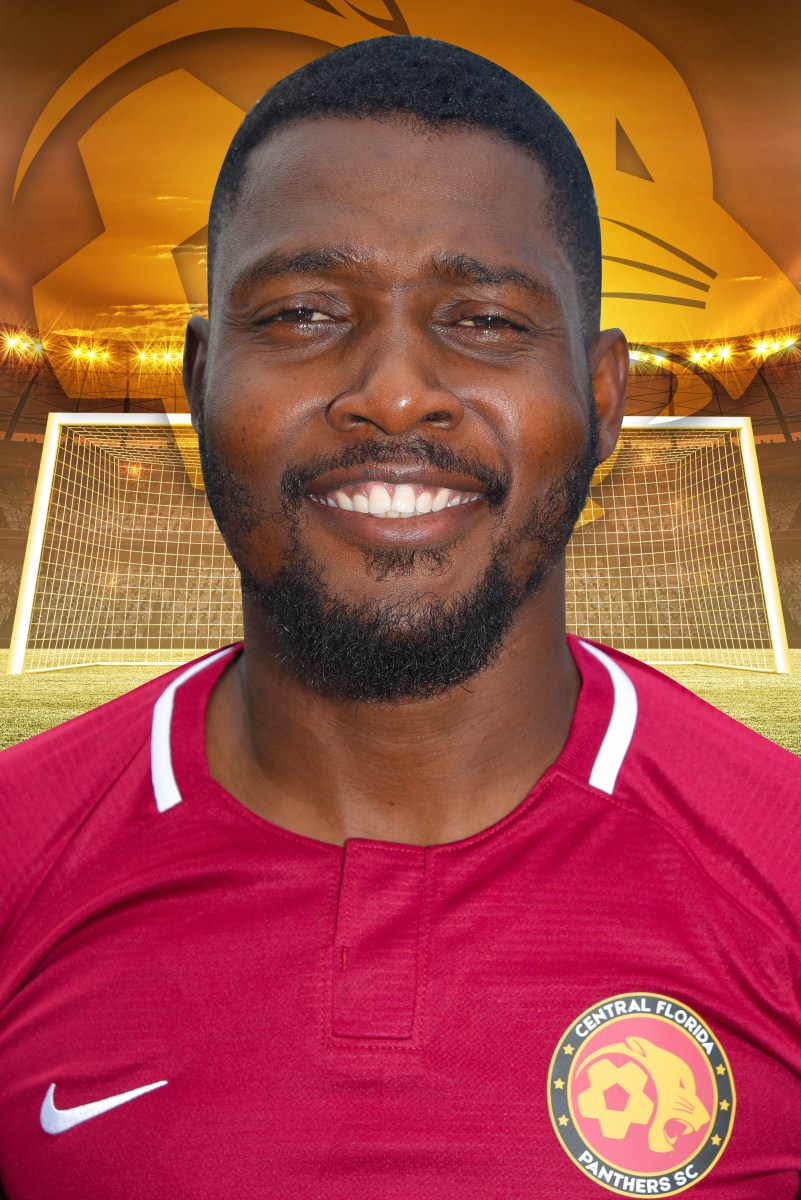
- Jean Jacques with Central Florida Panthers in 2019

Personal information
- Full name: Bitielo Jean Jacques
- Date of birth: December 28, 1990 (age 35)
- Place of birth: Port-au-Prince, Haiti
- Height: 5 ft 7 in (1.70 m)
- Position: Defender

Team information
- Current team: Central Florida Crusaders

Youth career
- 2006–2008: Victory SC
- 2010: Royal Palm Beach Strikers

College career
Years	Team	Apps	(Gls)
2010–2012	Palm Beach State Panthers		

Senior career*
Years	Team	Apps	(Gls)
2011	River Plate Puerto Rico	2	(0)
2012	Ocala Stampede	14	(0)
2013	VSI Tampa Bay FC	10	(0)
2013–2014	SM Caen	0	(0)
2014	Orlando City SC	10	(0)
2015–2018	Kraze United	25	(0)
2019	Central Florida Panthers	4	(0)
2022–	Central Florida Crusaders (indoor)	0	(0)

International career
2007	Haiti U17	16	(0)
2008–2009	Haiti U20	2	(0)
2014–	Haiti	7	(0)

Managerial career
- 2015–2018: Orlando City SC Academy
- 2016–: Trinity Prep boys varsity (assistant)
- 2019–: Central Florida Panthers SC (assistant)
- * Club domestic league appearances and goals as of September 20, 2022

Bitielo Jean Jacques (born 28 December 1990) is a Haitian footballer who plays for the Central Florida Crusaders in the National Indoor Soccer League.

== Career ==
In his youth, Jean Jacques played soccer in his native Haiti. with Victory SC before moving to the US to play with Palm Beach State College.

His professional career began with USL Pro club River Plate Puerto Rico in 2011. After River Plate PR's withdrawal from the league, he signed with the new USL PDL franchise Ocala Stampede in 2012.

Jean Jacques returned to the professional leagues when his former coach, Matt Weston, signed him for VSI Tampa Bay FC during their 2013 pre-season.

Jean Jacques signed with Orlando City in April 2014. He was released upon the conclusion of the 2014 season, a casualty of the club's transition to Major League Soccer.

On September 20, 2022, Jean Jacques signed with the Central Florida Crusaders ahead of their inaugural National Indoor Soccer League season.
