= Sean Reynolds (soccer) =

American soccer player (born 1990)

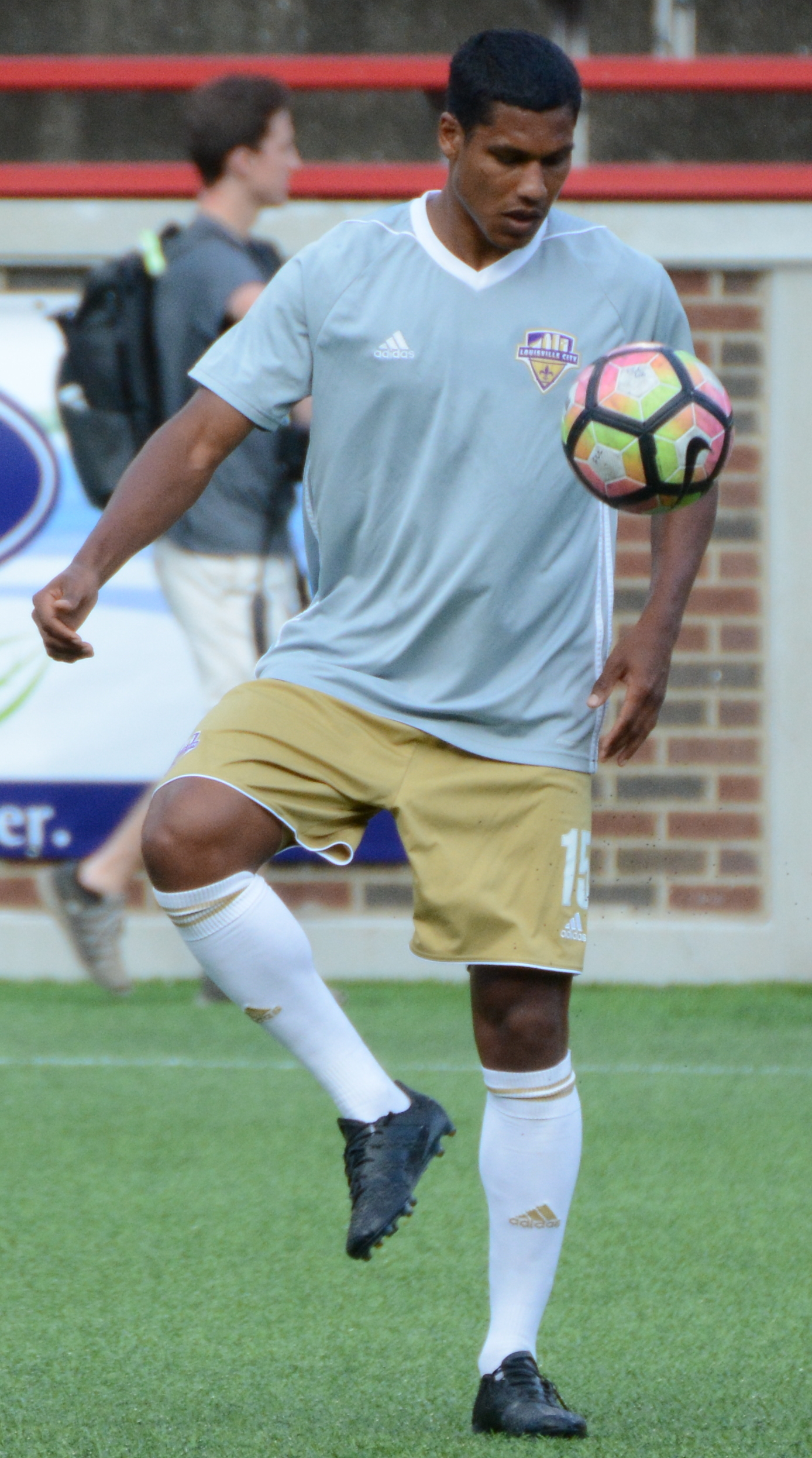
- Reynolds with Louisville City FC in 2017

Personal information
- Date of birth: 11 April 1990 (age 36)
- Place of birth: Fort Walton Beach, Florida
- Height: 1.85 m (6 ft 1 in)
- Position: Defender

College career
Years	Team	Apps	(Gls)
2008–2011	West Florida Argonauts		

Senior career*
Years	Team	Apps	(Gls)
2009	Baton Rouge Capitals	14	(0)
2011	Thunder Bay Chill	2	(0)
2012	Orlando City U-23	14	(0)
2013	VSI Tampa Bay	17	(1)
2014	FH	9	(0)
2015–2017	Louisville City	59	(1)
2018–2019	Saint Louis FC	55	(0)
2020	Chattanooga FC	1	(0)

Managerial career
- 2023–2026: St. Louis City SC Academy (assistant manager)
- 2026–: St. Louis City 2 (assistant manager)
- * Club domestic league appearances and goals as of March 17, 2020

Sean Reynolds (born 11 April 1990) is an American soccer player who currently an assistant manager for St. Louis City 2.

== Early life ==
=== Personal ===
Reynolds was born in Fort Walton Beach, Florida and attended Fort Walton Beach High School.

=== College and Youth ===
Reynolds played four years of college soccer at the University of West Florida between 2008 and 2011. He was twice named to the Gulf South Conference All-Conference team and earned the conference Player of the year award during his Senior season. He would lead the Argonauts to the championship game of the conference tournament where they would fall to Christian Brothers University in a penalty shoot-out.

Reynolds would also play amateur soccer in the PDL for the Baton Rouge Capitals, Thunder Bay Chill, and Orlando City U-23 squads in 2009, 2011, and 2010 respectively.

== Club career ==
=== VSI Tampa Bay FC ===
==== 2013 season ====
In March 2013, Reynolds signed with United Soccer League expansion club VSI Tampa Bay FC. On April 2, Reynolds made his debut for VSI Tampa Bay against the Los Angeles Blues in which came on in the 77th minute for Bitielo Jean Jacques as VSI won the match 1–0. He would then score his first professional goal on April 21 against the Los Angeles Blues in which he scored in the 53rd minute as VSI won the game 3–2. Reynolds would play 17 matches during the regular season but would ask for his release when Tampa Bay began having financial difficulties and could no longer pay their players. Following the season Reynolds would become disillusioned with playing professional soccer and briefly coached a high school team.

=== Fimleikafélag Hafnarfjarðar ===
==== 2014 season ====
After VSI Tampa Bay folded in November 2013, Reynolds would go on trial with FH of Iceland's Úrvalsdeild and would sign with them in January 2014. He made his debut in the Icelandic League Cup and would play in nine Úrvalsdeild matches and two matches in the qualifying rounds of Europa League. FH would go on to win the League Cup and finish runners-up in the Úrvalsdeild. Reynolds would suffer two torn ligaments and a tendon in his left leg during a practice. The injury would end his season.

=== Louisville City FC ===
==== 2015 season ====
On January 13, Reynolds signed with United Soccer League club Louisville City FC and would make his season debut on May 2 against Charlotte. He would appear 16 of Louisville's 28 regular season matches as well as two matches each in both the US Open Cup and USL Cup.

==== 2016 season ====
Reynolds would be retained by Louisville and would make his season debut March 26 against Charlotte. He would go on to play in 24 of Louisville's 30 regular season matches as well as one US Open Cup match. He'd also play in all three of Louisville's USL Cup matches registering one assist. During the Eastern Conference Finals match against New York Red Bulls II Reynolds would be sent off in extra time. New York would later win the match in penalties.

==== 2017 season ====
Reynolds missed the first three games of the 2017 season while serving a suspension for being sent off in the Eastern Conference Finals match from the previous season. He would make his season debut on June 3 against Charleston and he would go on to play in 18 of Louisville's 32 regular season matches. He would score his first goal for Louisville and only goal of the season on August 12 against rival FC Cincinnati. Reynolds would also appear in both of Louisville's US Open Cup matches as well as one of Louisville's USL Cup matches. Reynolds and Louisville would go on to win the USL Cup Final against Swope Park.

Reynolds would be released following the season.

=== Club ===
As of February 29, 2020

Club	Season	League		League Cup		Domestic Cup		International		Total	
Club	Season	Apps	Goals	Apps	Goals	Apps	Goals	Apps	Goals	Apps	Goals
VSI Tampa Bay	2013	17	1	0	0	1	0	—	—	18	1
FH	2014	9	0	9	0	1	0	2	0	21	0
Louisville City	2015	16	0	2	0	2	0	—	—	20	0
Louisville City	2016	24	0	3	0	1	0	—	—	28	0
Louisville City	2017	19	1	1	0	1	0	—	—	21	1
Saint Louis	2018	33	0	1	0	2	0	—	—	36	0
Saint Louis	2019	22	0	0	0	2	0	—	—	24	0
Chattanooga	2020	1	0	0	0	0	0	—	—	1	0
Career total		141	2	16	0	10	0	2	0	169	2

== Honors ==
=== Club ===
Fimleikafélag Hafnarfjarðar

- Icelandic League Cup: 2014

Louisville City FC

- USL Cup (1): 2017
