= Cheyne Roberts =

American soccer player (born 1988)

Personal information
- Full name: Weston Cheyne Roberts
- Date of birth: March 27, 1988 (age 38)
- Place of birth: Plant City, Florida, United States
- Height: 6 ft 0 in (1.83 m)
- Position: Defender

College career
Years	Team	Apps	(Gls)
2006–2009	Palm Beach Atlantic Sailfish		

Senior career*
Years	Team	Apps	(Gls)
2010–2012	Charlotte Eagles	44	(3)
2013	VSI Tampa Bay	5	(0)
2016	Tampa Bay Rowdies 2	2	(0)

Managerial career
- 2013–2015: Ocala Stampede
- 2016: Tampa Bay Rowdies 2
- 2017–2019: Tampa Bay Rowdies (assistant)
- * Club domestic league appearances and goals as of January 2, 2020

Weston Cheyne Roberts (born March 27, 1988, in Plant City, Florida) is a retired American soccer player.

== Career ==
=== Youth and college ===
Roberts attended Plant City High School, and played college soccer at Palm Beach Atlantic University. He was named to the ICAA First-Team, was honored as a NCCAA All-American Honorable Mention, and was awarded the Most Outstanding Offensive Player from the NCCAA National Tournament as a freshman in 2006, was named to the ICAA First Team and the NCCAA All-American First-Team while being awarded the Most Outstanding Defensive Player from the NCCAA National Tournament as a sophomore in 2007, and was an NCAA/NSCAA South Region 2nd-Team, NCCAA All-American 1st-Team, NCCAA All-Region selection, the NCCAA South Region Player of the Year and a NCCAA Scholar-Athlete as a junior in 2008.

=== Professional ===
Roberts turned professional in 2010 when he signed with the Charlotte Eagles of the USL Second Division. He made his professional debut on April 24, 2010, in a league match against the Richmond Kickers. He scored his first professional goal in his eighth league appearance for Charlotte, a 2–1 win over the Los Angeles Blues on May 14, 2011.

=== Coaching ===
Roberts was the head coach of the Ocala Stampede of the USL PDL from 2013 to 2015. In his three years at Ocala, the Stampede finished at the top of their division every season and won the PDL Southern Conference in 2014 and 2015. In 2014 and 2015, Ocala made it to the PDL's national semifinals.

On March 25, 2016, Roberts was announced as the first head coach of Tampa Bay Rowdies 2 of the National Premier Soccer League. Rowdies 2 is the official developmental team of the North American Soccer League's Tampa Bay Rowdies.

Following the transition of the Tampa Bay Rowdies 2 to the Tampa Bay Rowdies U23, Roberts moved full-time as an assistant coach for the USL club.

Cheyne's brother, Clay, is the current head coach for the MASL's Florida Tropics SC and the Southeastern Fire.
