= Alex Horwath =

American soccer player (born 1987)

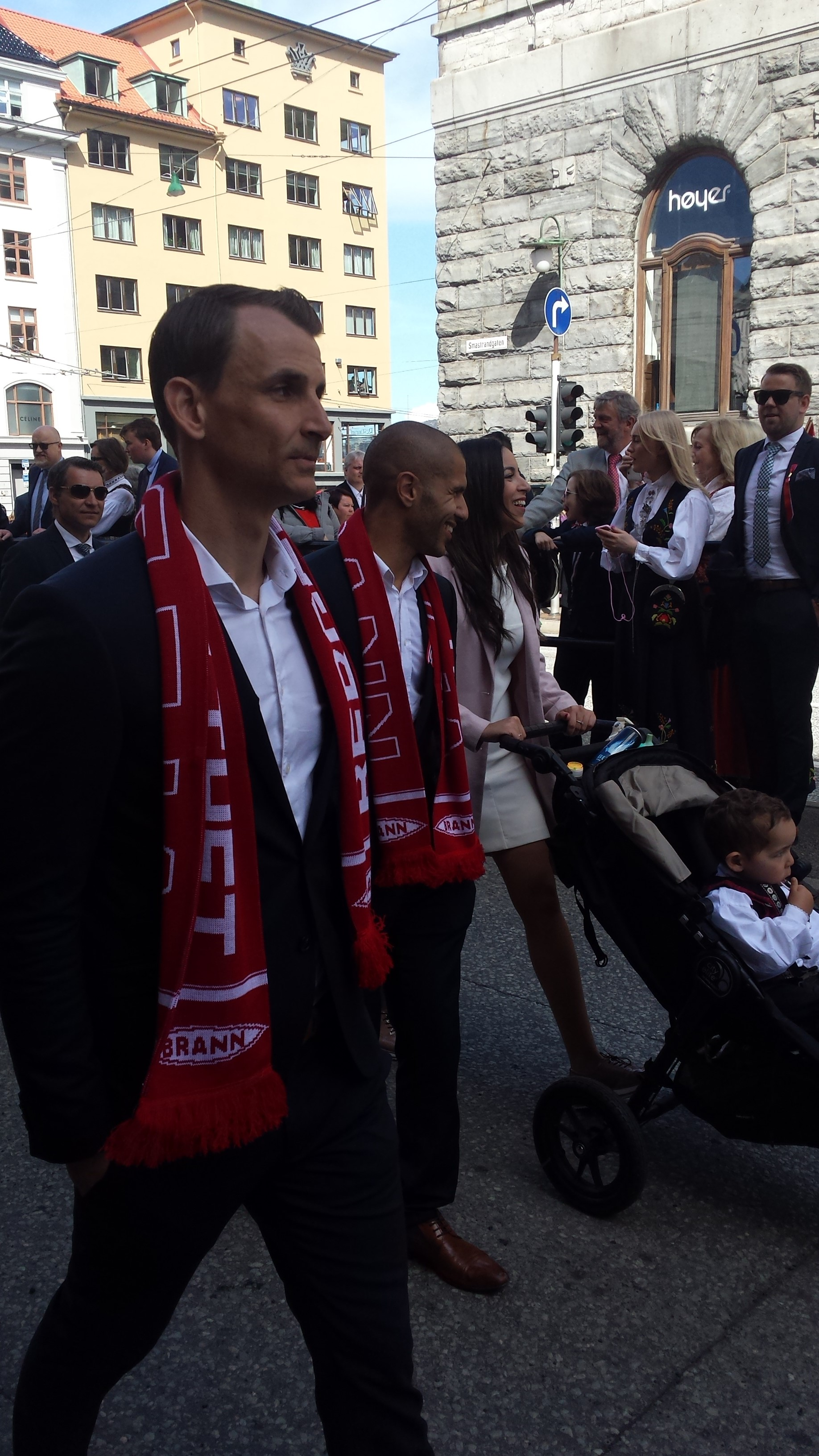

Personal information
- Full name: Alexander Horwath
- Date of birth: March 27, 1987 (age 39)
- Place of birth: Woodbine, Maryland, U.S.
- Height: 6 ft 4 in (1.93 m)
- Position: Goalkeeper

Youth career
- 2001–2003: D.C. United

College career
Years	Team	Apps	(Gls)
2007–2009	Wisconsin Badgers		

Senior career*
Years	Team	Apps	(Gls)
2007	Madison 56ers		
2008	Northern Virginia Royals	10	(0)
2009	Kansas City Brass	5	(0)
2010	MLS Pool	–	(–)
2010	→ San Jose Earthquakes (loan)	0	(0)
2010	→ Seattle Sounders FC (loan)	0	(0)
2011	New York Red Bulls	1	(0)
2012	Wilmington Hammerheads	24	(0)
2013	VSI Tampa Bay FC	23	(0)
2014	Ljungskile SK	30	(0)
2015–2017	Brann	15	(0)
2018–2019	Real Salt Lake	0	(0)
2018–2019	→ Real Monarchs (loan)	4	(0)

International career
2004	United States U17		
2006	United States U19		
- * Club domestic league appearances and goals

Alexander Horwath (born March 27, 1987) is an American retired soccer player who played as a goalkeeper.

== Career ==
=== College and amateur ===
Horwath began his youth career with D.C. United, remaining with the youth squad from 2001 to 2003. In 2005, he attended college at the University of Connecticut but did not play due to an injury. In 2007, he transferred to the University of Wisconsin. While with Wisconsin, Horwath established himself as his team's starting goalkeeper, appearing in 52 matches in his three years.

Horwath played in the USL Premier Development League during his collegiate career. In 2008, he played for the Northern Virginia Royals and in 2009 with Kansas City Brass. He also played with the Madison 56ers of the National Premier Soccer League in 2007.

=== Professional ===
At the conclusion of his college career, Horwath trained with Kansas City Wizards and was signed by Major League Soccer in April 2010 serving as the league pool goalkeeper to help teams during a goalkeeper emergency. During August 2010 he joined San Jose Earthquakes to replace the injured Joe Cannon. After remaining with San Jose for a few weeks, in October 2010 he joined Seattle Sounders FC and remained with the club until the end of the season.

During the 2011 Major League Soccer offseason Horwath went on trial with New York Red Bulls. On March 25, 2011, it was announced that Horwath had agreed to terms with New York. One day later Horwath made his official debut for New York starting in place of the injured Greg Sutton and Bouna Coundoul who was on international duty, helping his club to a 0–0 draw against Columbus Crew.

Horwath was waived by New York on November 23, 2011.

Horwath spent two years playing in the USL Pro, playing with the Wilmington Hammerheads in 2012 and VSI Tampa Bay FC in 2013. After initially signing with the Rochester Rhinos for 2014, Horwath instead joined Ljungskile SK in the second division of Sweden.

On January 9, 2015, he signed for Norwegian side SK Brann, after spending some days there undergoing tests and trials.

Horwath made his debut for SK Brann on April 6, 2015, against Fredrikstad FK, saving a 65th-minute penalty kick from Steffen Nystrøm in a match that ended 1–1. Horwath went on to make 8 appearances for SK Brann in the 2015 season which culminated with Brann gaining promotion to the 2016 Tippeligaen.

Horwath started the season as SK Brann's second-choice goalkeeper, behind Piotr Leciejewski in the pecking order. He ended up starting four games during the season, including SK Brann's infamous loss to Førde IL in the first round of the 2016 Norwegian Cup. SK Brann ended the season as runners-up behind Rosenborg BK.

The 2017 season started similarly as the last for Horwath, with Leciejewski being favored in goal for SK Brann. Horwath was used as the "cup keeper", and started all four games SK Brann played in the 2017 Norwegian Football Cup before they lost to Mjøndalen IF on August 9, 2017. Horwath also played the second leg of SK Branns Europa League second round qualifier match against MFK Ružomberok.

Horwath returned to the United States in February 2018 when he signed with MLS club Real Salt Lake.

On November 21, 2019, it was announced that Horwath had retired from playing professional soccer.

=== International ===
Horwath played with the United States U-17 and United States U-19 national team.
