= Matt Weston (football coach) =

English football manager (born 1975)

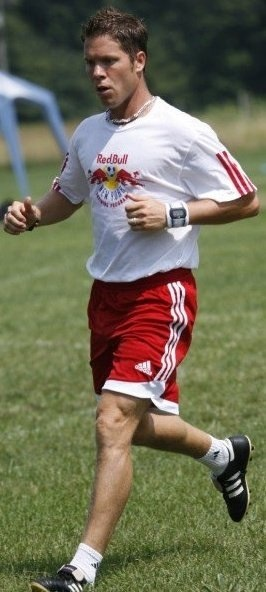

Personal information
- Full name: Matthew Weston
- Date of birth: 5 November 1975 (age 50)
- Place of birth: Salford, England
- Positions: Right back; midfielder

Team information
- Current team: Dayton Dutch Lions (Head Coach)

Youth career
- 1986–1990: Manchester United
- 1986–1990: Ipswich Town

Senior career*
Years	Team	Apps	(Gls)
1994–1995	Ipswich Town	0	(0)
1995	→ Stockport County (loan)	0	(0)
1996–1999	Leigh RMI		
2005	FC United of Manchester	0	(0)
Total		0	(0)

Managerial career
- 2010: SUNY Purchase Women's Team
- 2010–2011: F.C. New York
- 2012: Ocala Stampede
- 2013: VSI Tampa Bay FC
- 2014: Dayton Dutch Lions
- * Club domestic league appearances and goals

Matt Weston (born 5 November 1975) is an English football coach/manager. He was the former head coach of FC New York and VSI Tampa Bay FC in the USL Professional League and technical director of Premier Development League team Ocala Stampede. He is now head coach of the Dayton Dutch Lions of the USL Pro.

== Playing career ==
Weston began his career in the youth academy of Manchester United, where he played for four years without making it into the first-team squad. Weston was a member of the club's 'School Of Excellence' which boasted some of the country's finest talent (Fergie's Fledglings).

Weston moved to Ipswich Town in 1990, where he played for five years in the youth and reserve teams, including a 5-month loan stint with Stockport County. He had later stints with semi-pro clubs Leigh RMI and FC United of Manchester. His identical twin brother Kenny was also on Ipswich's books without breaking through to the first team and also moved on to coaching abroad, in his case in Australia.

Upon arriving in the United States in 2006, Weston became a player development officer for Major League Soccer. He then moved on to work as the assistant coach at the University of Bridgeport in 2008 before setting up his own business, Weston Pro Soccer. He also runs a soccer scholarship recruitment business called Weston Pro Scholarship Specialists. He is the former coaching director for CFC (Connecticut Football Club) and was the head coach of CFC's Elite Women's College Showcase Team, as well as the head coach at SUNY Purchase and has also set up a Premier Soccer Program in Connecticut.

Weston's first foray into professional coaching was with USL Pro club F.C. New York in 2010. He resigned in May 2011 – a year after he began with his assistant coach former Arsenal striker Paul Shaw taking over as interim head coach. In March 2012 Weston was announced as technical director/head coach for USL Premier Development League club Ocala Stampede. The Florida-based PDL club won the South East conference in the club's inaugural season, qualifying for the US Open Cup in 2013. They were eventually defeated in the Southern Conference semi-final by Austin Aztec. Weston was then headhunted by VSI, being named as head coach of new USL Pro franchise VSI Tampa Bay FC on 21 November 2012. Weston took the new franchise to the top of the USL Pro standings in late April but departed the club shortly after. VSI Tampa Bay FC failed to make the USL Pro playoffs in 2013. Weston rejoined Ocala Stampede of the Premier Development League as the club's Technical Director in 2014. He helped lead Ocala to the USL PDL National Semifinals. He was hired as head coach of the Dayton Dutch Lions on 7 August 2014.
