= Shaun Utterson =

English footballer

Personal information
- Full name: Shaun Keith Utterson
- Date of birth: 2 February 1990 (age 36)
- Place of birth: Newcastle-Upon-Tyne, England
- Positions: Defender; midfielder

Youth career
- Wallsend Boys Club
- 2005–2008: Monkseaton Juniors FC
- 2008–2011: UNC Wilmington Seahawks

Senior career*
Years	Team	Apps	(Gls)
2012	Blyth Spartans	49	(2)
2013	Wilmington Hammerheads	22	(0)
2014	Blyth Spartans	3	(0)
- * Club domestic league appearances and goals

Shaun Keith Utterson (born 2 February 1990 in Newcastle upon Tyne, England) is an English footballer.

== Career ==
Utterson started his career with Wallsend Boys Club. He went from Wallsend to Monkseaton Football Academy, where he was named 2007 young Player-of-the-Year. After the 2008 season, he joined UNC Wilmington Seahawks and played four years of college soccer at UNC Wilmington between 2008 and 2011. After graduating, he returned home to England and played for Conference North club Blyth Spartans in 2012.

Utterson returned to Wilmington in 2013, when he signed for USL Pro club Wilmington Hammerheads and played 22 games for the club in the USL Professional Division, before joined on loan to former club Blyth Spartans AFC. On 3 March 2014, he returned from England to Wilmington Hammerheads FC.
