= Plant City Stadium =

Sports venue in Florida, United States

Coordinates: 27.9974897°N 82.1079111°W

- Interactive map of Plant City Stadium
- Location: 1900 S Park Road; Plant City, FL 33563-8113
- Owner: City of Plant City
- Capacity: 6,700
- Surface: Grass
- Field size: Left – 330 ft. Center – 404 ft. Right – 330 ft.

Construction
- Opened: 1988
- Renovated: 1999, 2019
- Cost: $5.7 million (full complex)
- Architects: Lescher & Mahoney

Tenants
- Tampa Bay Starfish (USAFL) (2015–); Cincinnati Reds (MLB) (spring training) (1988–1997); VSI Tampa Bay FC (USL Pro) (2013); Tampa Bay Vipers practice facility (XFL) (2020) Four Corners Upper School Coyotes (High School) (2023-

Plant City Stadium is a stadium in Plant City, Florida with a capacity of about 6,000. It was built in 1988 as the new spring training home of the Cincinnati Reds, who had previously trained at Al Lopez Field in nearby Tampa for many years. In 1998, the Reds left Plant City for Ed Smith Stadium in Sarasota. After the departure of the Reds, Plant City Stadium mainly hosted local amateur baseball and softball games.

In 2012, the stadium became the home pitch for several VisionPro Institute developmental soccer teams, including VSI Tampa Bay FC of USL Pro, VSI Tampa Bay FC of the USL Premier Development League, and VSI Tampa Bay FC of the USL W-League. In early 2020, the Tampa Bay Vipers of the XFL renovated and took over the facility for use as its practice facilities.
