= Douglas dos Santos (footballer, born 1991) =

Brazilian footballer

Personal information
- Full name: Douglas Gonçalves dos Santos
- Date of birth: 2 February 1991 (age 35)
- Place of birth: Arapiraca, Brazil
- Height: 1.73 m (5 ft 8 in)
- Position: Midfielder

Senior career*
| Years | Team | Apps | (Gls) |
| 2011–2012 | Náutico | 2 | (0) |
| 2012 | Belo Jardim | | |
| 2012 | Ocala Stampede | 12 | (8) |
| 2013 | VSI Tampa Bay | 24 | (3) |
| 2014–2017 | Chicago Mustangs (indoor) | 24 | (13) |
| 2017–2018 | Harrisburg Heat (indoor) | 14 | (1) |
| 2018–2020 | St. Louis Ambush (indoor) | 36 | (9) |
| 2021–2022 | Milwaukee Wave (indoor) | 2 | (0) |
- * Club domestic league appearances and goals as of 16 December 2022

Douglas Gonçalves dos Santos (born 2 February 1991 in Arapiraca) is a Brazilian footballer who plays as a defender.

== Career ==
=== VSI Tampa Bay ===
After spending time with Clube Náutico Capibaribe in the Campeonato Brasileiro Série B and Belo Jardim Futebol Clube in the local leagues in Brazil, Dos Santos played for the USL-PDL Club the Ocala Stampede in 2012. He then signed on with the expansion franchise in the USL Pro, the third-tier of American soccer, VSI Tampa Bay FC in 2013. On 30 March 2013 Douglas made his debut for Tampa Bay against other new expansion franchise Phoenix FC in which he came on in the 53rd minute as Tampa Bay suffered a 1–0 defeat. On 2 April 2013, Dos Santos was credited with the first assist in VSI Tampa Bay FC history, setting up teammate Antonio Neto for the game-winning goal vs the Los Angeles Blues.

== Career statistics ==
=== Club ===
Statistics accurate as of 20 December 2013

| Club | Season | League | | US Open Cup | | CONCACAF | | Other | | Total | |
| Club | Season | Apps | Goals | Apps | Goals | Apps | Goals | Apps | Goals | Apps | Goals |
|---|---|---|---|---|---|---|---|---|---|---|---|
| VSI Tampa Bay | 2013 | 24 | 3 | 0 | 0 | — | — | 0 | 0 | 24 | 3 |
| Career total | | 24 | 3 | 0 | 0 | 0 | 0 | 0 | 0 | 24 | 3 |
