= Chad Burt =

American soccer player (born 1988)

Personal information
- Date of birth: March 3, 1988 (age 38)
- Place of birth: St. Petersburg, Florida, United States
- Height: 5 ft 8 in (1.73 m)
- Position: Attacking midfielder

College career
Years	Team	Apps	(Gls)
2005–2008	Tampa Spartans		

Senior career*
Years	Team	Apps	(Gls)
2007	Colorado Rapids U23's	13	(17)
2008	Atlanta Silverbacks U23's	28	(22)
2008–2009	Milwaukee Wave (indoor)	20	(31)
2010–2011	FC Tampa Bay	51	(34)
2013	VSI Tampa Bay FC	20	(9)
2014	Myresjö IF	19	(16)
2014–2015	FC Edmonton	20	(12)

Managerial career
- 2020–2021: Tampa Bay Rowdies (assistant)
- * Club domestic league appearances and goals as of June 14, 2015

Chad Burt (born March 3, 1988) is an American soccer coach and retired player.

== Career ==
=== College and amateur ===
Burt attended Northeast High School and played college soccer at the University of Tampa from 2005 to 2006. During his college years, Burt broke two freshman records (Most starts as a freshman) (Most minutes played as a freshman) also played with the Colorado Rapids U23's and the Atlanta Silverbacks U23'sin the USL Premier Development League.

=== Professionally ===
Burt played professional indoor soccer for Milwaukee Wave in the Major Indoor Soccer League in 2008–09, scoring six goals in 20 games for team.

Burt signed for the FC Tampa Bay in the USSF Division 2 Professional League in March 2010 and made his professional debut on April 16, 2010, in Tampa's first-ever game, a 1–0 victory over Crystal Palace Baltimore. He scored his first professional goal on October 1, 2010, in a 6–3 victory, again over Crystal Palace Baltimore. The club moved to the North American Soccer League in 2011. After spending the 2011 season with FC Tampa Bay, the club announced on October 4, 2011, that it would not re-sign Burt for the 2012 season.

On July 11, 2014, FC Edmonton signed Burt after he trialled with them during their mid-season Western Canada friendly tour.

== Coaching ==
Burt is an assistant director of coaching for the Strictly Soccer Futbol Club (SSFC), a FYSA Region C Club in St. Petersburg, Florida.

On January 16, 2020, Burt was announced as an assistant coach for the Tampa Bay Rowdies of USL Championship. Burt left his position with the Rowdies following the 2021 season.
