= Andriy Budnyi =

Ukrainian footballer (born 1982)

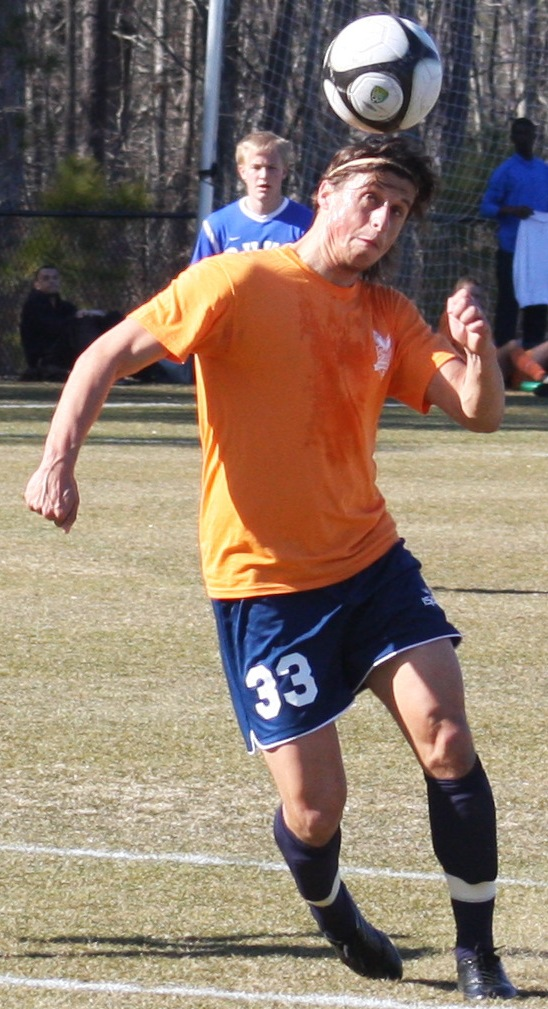
- Budnyi playing against the Carolina Railhawks in 2010.

Personal information
- Full name: Andriy Budnyi
- Date of birth: 20 September 1982 (age 44)
- Place of birth: Chernivtsi, Ukrainian SSR, Soviet Union
- Height: 5 ft 11 in (1.80 m)
- Position: Forward

Youth career
- FC Bukovyna Chernivtsi

College career
Years	Team	Apps	(Gls)
2001	Bard Raptors		
2002	San Jose State Spartans		
2004–2005	Azusa Pacific Cougars		

Senior career*
Years	Team	Apps	(Gls)
2004–2005	Cascade Surge	21	(18)
2006	Charlotte Eagles	8	(1)
2006–2007	Arsenal Bila Tserkva		
2007–2008	Obolon Kyiv	24	(3)
2007–2008	→ Obolon-2 Kyiv (loan)	36	(24)
2009–2010	Carolina RailHawks	43	(6)
2009	→ Wilmington Hammerheads (loan)	1	(1)
2011–2012	Wilmington Hammerheads	38	(16)
2011–2013	Syracuse Silver Knights (indoor)	45	(33)
2013	VSI Tampa Bay	18	(5)
2015–2016	Ontario Fury (indoor)	3	(0)
2016	Southern California Seahorses	8	(6)
2017	Golden State Force	1	(0)

Managerial career
- 2016–: Azusa Pacific Cougars (asst.)
- * Club domestic league appearances and goals as of 7 May 2020

Andriy Budnyi (born 20 September 1982) is a Ukrainian footballer.

== Career ==
=== College and amateur ===
In 2002, Budnyi attended Bard College. He transferred to San Jose State University in 2002. He then transferred to Azusa Pacific University, where he earned the 2005 Golden State Athletic Conference and Region II Player of the Year award.

During his college years he also played two seasons with Cascade Surge in the USL Premier Development League, helping the team to two PDL Northwest Division titles, and being named to the PDL All-Western Conference teams in both 2004 and 2005.

=== Professional ===
Having spent much of the early part of 2006 training with Chivas USA of Major League Soccer, Budnyi signed his first professional contract with Charlotte Eagles of the USL Second Division on 28 June 2006, and subsequently played in 8 games for the team, scoring 1 goal.

Budnyi returned to his homeland in 2006, playing initially for Arsenal Bila Tserkva and then for Obolon Kyiv. He was the top scorer for Obolon's reserves, FC Obolon-2 Kyiv, in the Ukrainian Second League in 2007–2008, with 20 goals.

Budnyi returned to the United States in early 2009, and joined Carolina RailHawks of the USL First Division in April 2009. On 22 July 2009, the RailHawks sent him on loan for one game to the Wilmington Hammerheads of the USL Second Division. On 22 February 2010 Carolina announced the re-signing of Budnyi to a new contract for the 2010 season.

Budnyi joined USL Pro club Wilmington Hammerheads in February 2011.

Budnyi joined the Syracuse Silver Knights in 2011. He did not re-sign at the start of the new season.

Budnyi returned the struggling Syracuse Silver Knights after signing a contract after the 2012–13 season had begun to add more firepower to their attack.
