= VSI Tampa Bay FC =

- Full name: VisionPro Sports Institute Tampa Bay Football Club
- Nickname: Flames
- Founded: 2011
- Dissolved: 2013
- Stadium: Plant City Stadium; Plant City, Florida
- Capacity: 6,700
- General Manager: Alex Miranda
- Head Coach: Joel Harrison
- League: USL Pro
Home colors	Away colors

VSI Tampa Bay FC was an American soccer team based in Plant City, Florida. They played in USL Pro, the third tier of the American soccer pyramid, in the 2013 season. VSI Tampa Bay FC were owned by VisionPro Sports Institute and were affiliated with a women's team in the W-League, an amateur team in the USL Premier Development League (PDL), and a youth team in the Super-20 League. All the teams folded in 2013.

== History ==
In 2011, English soccer development academy VisionPro Sports Institute announced a venture to establish a soccer organization in the United Soccer Leagues in the United States. VSI partnered with the local Brandon, Florida area youth soccer organization, West Florida Flames, to build VSI Tampa Flames, "the perfect platform for vertical progression, giving talented youngsters the opportunity to progress from junior soccer all the way through to the professional game," according to VSI's CEO, Simon Crane. The USL Pro team was to serve as the pinnacle of the youth pyramid for men; the club also included a women's team in the W-League, an amateur team in the USL Premier Development League (PDL), and a youth team in the Super-20 League. The W-League, PDL, and Super-20 League teams started play in 2012, while the USL Pro team was to join in 2013. On November 22, 2012, the team changed its name to "VSI Tampa Bay FC" and named Matt Weston as the head coach.

Their first game was played on March 30, 2013, losing to Phoenix FC 1–0. They defeated the Los Angeles Blues 1–0 for their first win on April 2, 2013. Antonio Neto scored the first goal in team history.

VSI Tampa Bay chose Plant City Stadium as their home venue on April 4, 2013, moving all the teams there. Matt Weston resigned as Head Coach on May 8, 2013, and Joel Harrison was named as Interim Head Coach.

While the W-League and PDL teams had been successful in 2012, the USL Pro team struggled throughout its only season. The remote stadium in Plant City made it difficult to attract fans, and the team suffered from competition from the more successful Tampa Bay Rowdies of the North American Soccer League. The organization folded all of its teams after the 2013 season.

== Final roster ==
No.	Position	Nation	Player
1	GK	USA	Alex Horwath
2	DF	ENG	Jamie McGuinness
3	DF	HAI	Bitielo Jean Jacques
4	MF	BRA	Antonio Neto
5	DF	USA	Troy Cole
6	DF	USA	Kyle Hoffer
7	MF	BRA	Douglas Dos Santos
8	DF	BRA	Alex Freitas
9	FW	UKR	Andriy Budnyi
10	FW	GAM	Karamba Janneh
11	MF	USA	Tony Donatelli
12	MF	USA	Christian Silva
13	MF	HAI	Sébastien Thurière
14	DF	JAM	Richard Dixon
15	MF	TTO	Darren Toby
16	MF	USA	Dominic Cutrofello
17	MF	USA	J. T. Noone
18	DF	USA	Sean Reynolds
19	GK	USA	Jeremy Crumpton
20	MF	USA	Shawn Chin
21	MF	USA	Jarod Stigall
22	FW	SLE	Sallieu Bundu
23	FW	BRA	Mauricio Salles
24	DF	USA	Josh Rife
25	MF	USA	Chad Burt
26	DF	USA	Cheyne Roberts
00	GK	USA	Dave Martin

== Staff ==
- (United States) Joel Harrison – Head Coach
- (Trinidad and Tobago) Sheldon Cipriani – Head Coach, PDL Team / First Team Assistant Coach
- (England) Sam Mitchell – Head Coach, Super-20 League Team / First Team Assistant Coach
- (Ecuador) Jorge Zavala – Goalkeeping Coach / First Team Assistant Coach
- (United States) Mac McCarthy – Performance Coach
- (England) John Mitchell – Head of Operations
- (United States) Clay Roberts – Director of Soccer

== Team records ==
=== Year-by-Year ===
Year	Division	League	Regular season (W-T-L)	Playoffs	Open Cup	Avg. attendance	Top scorer	Goals
2013	3	USL	10th (9–5–12)	did not qualify	2nd Round	452	(Brazil) Mauricio Salles	10

=== Head coaches ===
- Includes USL Regular season, USL Play-offs and U.S. Lamar Hunt Open Cup

All time VSI Tampa Bay FC Coaching Stats
Coach	Nationality	Start	End	Games	Win	Loss	Draw	Win %
Matt Weston	United States	November 2012	May 2013	7	5	2	0	71.43
Joel Harrison	United States	May 2013	August 2013	19	4	10	5	21.05

== See also ==
- VSI Tampa Bay FC (PDL)
- VSI Tampa Bay FC (W-League)
