= Kyle Hoffer =

American soccer player (born 1989)

Personal information
- Full name: Kyle Alexander Hoffer
- Date of birth: October 26, 1989 (age 37)
- Place of birth: Englewood, New Jersey, United States
- Height: 6 ft 1 in (1.85 m)
- Positions: Defender; midfielder

College career
| Years | Team | Apps | (Gls) |
| 2007 | Oneonta Red Dragons | | |
| 2008–2010 | St. John's Red Storm | | |

Senior career*
| Years | Team | Apps | (Gls) |
| 2010 | Brooklyn Knights | 11 | (1) |
| 2011 | F.C. New York | 24 | (2) |
| 2011 | → Ekenäs IF (loan) | | |
| 2012 | Charleston Battery | 20 | (0) |
| 2013 | VSI Tampa Bay FC | 21 | (1) |
| 2014 | Rochester Rhinos | 27 | (1) |
| 2015 | Austin Aztex | 10 | (0) |
- * Club domestic league appearances and goals as of February 13, 2014

Kyle Alexander Hoffer (born October 26, 1989) is an American soccer player.

== Career ==
=== College and amateur ===
Hoffer grew up in Bardonia, New York, and attended Albertus Magnus High School, where he earned team MVP honors in 2005 and 2006 and was named the 2006 Rockland County's Player of the Year. He played one year of college soccer at the State University of New York at Oneonta, where he earned rookie of the year honors, before transferring to St. John's University prior to his sophomore year.

During his college years he also played with the Brooklyn Knights in the USL Premier Development League. On June 26, 2013,

=== Professional ===
Hoffer signed his first professional contract in 2011 when he was signed by F.C. New York of the USL Professional Division. He made his professional debut on April 9, 2011, in New York's first-ever game, a 3–0 loss to Orlando City, and scored his first professional goal on May 7 in a 1–1 tie with the Harrisburg City Islanders.

At the end of the 2011 USL Pro season, Hoffer signed with Ekenäs IFof the Finnish second division.

Hoffer returned to USL Pro for the 2012 season when he signed with Charleston Battery on January 6, 2012.

After spending 2014 with USL Pro club Rochester Rhinos, Hoffer moved to new USL franchise Austin Aztex for the 2015 season.
