= Sébastien Thurière =

Haitian footballer (born 1990)

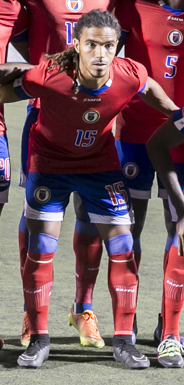

Personal information
- Date of birth: January 6, 1990 (age 36)
- Place of birth: St. Petersburg, Florida, United States
- Height: 1.85 m (6 ft 1 in)
- Position: Midfielder

Team information
- Current team: Penang
- Number: 16

College career
Years	Team	Apps	(Gls)
2008–2012	South Florida Bulls	69	(12)

Senior career*
Years	Team	Apps	(Gls)
2011	Bradenton Academics	14	(2)
2012	VSI Tampa Flames	15	(2)
2013	VSI Tampa Bay FC	21	(4)
2014	Dayton Dutch Lions	25	(4)
2015	Charleston Battery	19	(1)
2016	San Antonio FC	22	(1)
2016–2017	Sheikh Russel KC		
2018	Terengganu II	17	(1)
2019–2020	Penang	10	(1)

International career^{‡}
2014–	Haiti	20	(0)
- * Club domestic league appearances and goals as of May 3, 2019 ‡ National team caps and goals as of August 20, 2015

Sébastien Thurière (born January 6, 1990) is a Haitian footballer who last played as a midfielder for Penang in Malaysia Premier League.

== Early life ==
Thurière was born in St. Petersburg, Florida. Prior to his professional career he played soccer at the University of South Florida. He recorded 13 goals and 7 assists in his college career. He captained the South Florida Bulls for 3 years before graduating with a BA in Environmental Science and starting his professional career.

=== Youth ===
In 2004, Thurière spent playing at Cap Girondins de Bordeaux youth academy in Bordeaux France, finishing first in his class.

He was tagged by Real Salt Lake's MLS program between 2007 and 2008. In 2008, he trained with Blackburn Rovers FC Reserves in England for 3 weeks.

He was rated Seminole High School's best midfielder for three consecutive years between 06 and 08. He was named MVP in ‘07 and ‘08, along with Pinellas All-County Player of the Year (2008), County All-Star team honors (2008) and led Seminole HS in scoring (2008). Three time State Champions and one regional title with RSL Club in Tampa, Fl. He was named to RISE Magazine’s All Soccer Area Team in ‘07 and ‘08.

== Professional career ==
=== VSI Tampa Bay ===
Thurière made his debut for VSI Tampa Bay FC of USL Pro on 30 March 2013 in a 1-0 loss to Phoenix FC in which he started.

=== Dayton Dutch Lions ===
After VSI Tampa Bay was shut down in late 2013, Thurière remained in the USL with Dayton Dutch Lions for the 2014 season. Thuriere was released by Dayton after the club chose to leave USL and return to amateur status following the season.

=== Charleston Battery ===
Thurière joined his third USL club Charleston Battery for the 2015 season and made 19 appearances. Played a strong roll as a central midfielder, but missed a good portion of the season due to International play with Haiti. Thuriere was called up for World Cup Qualifiers, International friendlies, and the 2015 Gold Cup.

=== San Antonio FC ===
After a pre season camp with SK Brann, Thurière signed with USL expansion club San Antonio FC in early 2016.

== International ==
Though born and raised in the United States, Thurière is eligible for the Haiti national team and was first called into the squad for the 2014 Caribbean Cup. Thurière has become a regular member of the national side, recording one assist in a qualification game (Haiti 1-0 Trinidad) helped Haiti qualify for the first time in the Nation's history for the Copa America Centario. He has been selected for 30 matches, and has earned himself 20 caps with the Senior team in which many he has started. He has participated in World Cup Qualifiers for 2018 Russia, Caribbean Cup 2014 (3rd place), CONCACAF 2015 Gold Cup, Copa America Centario 2016 qualification, Copa America Camp, and Caribbean Cup 2016.

== Career statistics ==
=== Club ===
Statistics accurate as of 16 January 2014

Club	Season	League		US Open Cup		Other		CONCACAF		Total	
Club	Season	Apps	Goals	Apps	Goals	Apps	Goals	Apps	Goals	Apps	Goals
VSI Tampa Bay FC	2013	21	1	0	0	0	0	—	—	21	1
Career total		21	1	0	0	0	0	0	0	21	1
