= Alex Freitas (footballer, born 1988) =

Brazilian footballer

Personal information
- Date of birth: 14 November 1988 (age 37)
- Place of birth: Brazil
- Height: 1.71 m (5 ft 7 in)
- Position: Defender

Senior career*
Years	Team	Apps	(Gls)
2013	VSI Tampa Bay	19	(0)
- * Club domestic league appearances and goals as of 31 December 2024

Alex Freitas (born 14 November 1988) is a Brazilian footballer who plays as a defender.

== Career ==
Freitas made his debut for VSI Tampa Bay FC of the USL Pro, the third-tier of soccer in the United States, on 30 March 2013 against Phoenix FC in which he came on in the 53rd minute as Tampa Bay lost the match, 1–0.

== Career statistics ==
=== Club ===
Statistics accurate as of 2 April 2013

Club	Season	League		US Open Cup		CONCACAF		Other		Total	
Club	Season	Apps	Goals	Apps	Goals	Apps	Goals	Apps	Goals	Apps	Goals
VSI Tampa Bay	2013	1	0	0	0	0	0	—	—	1	0
Career total		1	0	0	0	0	0	0	0	1	0
