= Karamba Janneh =

Gambian footballer

Personal information
- Date of birth: 10 October 1989 (age 37)
- Place of birth: Banjul, Gambia
- Height: 1.70 m (5 ft 7 in)
- Position: Forward

Youth career
- 2008–2010: Manhattan SC

College career
| Years | Team | Apps | (Gls) |
| 2010 | Otero Rattlers | | |
| 2011 | Monroe Mustangs | | |

Senior career*
| Years | Team | Apps | (Gls) |
| 2012 | Ocala Stampede | 15 | (9) |
| 2013 | VSI Tampa Bay | 10 | (2) |
| 2014 | Ocala Stampede | 11 | (3) |
| 2014 | Dayton Dutch Lions | 6 | (2) |
| 2015 | Kitsap Pumas | 6 | (3) |
| 2016 | Tampa Bay Rowdies 2 | 10 | (8) |
| 2017–2021 | KidSuper Samba AC | 16 | (9) |
| 2019 | → F.A. Euro (loan) | 6 | (4) |
- * Club domestic league appearances and goals as of November 13, 2020

Karamba Janneh (born October 10, 1989 in Banjul, The Gambia) is a Gambian footballer who currently plays for KidSuper Samba AC in the Eastern Premier Soccer League.

== Career ==
Janneh made his debut for VSI Tampa Bay on 30 March 2013 against Phoenix FC.

Janneh made a professional return to Tampa on April 14, 2016, when he announced as part of the initial roster for the Tampa Bay Rowdies' NPSL reserve side Rowdies 2.

== Personal life ==
Karamba played during his youth, college and university career besides, his three-year younger brother Lamin Kere (born 1992).

He starred for John F. Kennedy High School in the Bronx, recording 88 goals and 33 assists in only 32 games between 10th and 12th grade.
