= Antonio Neto (footballer, born 1989) =

Brazilian footballer

Personal information
- Full name: Antonio de Santana Portugal Neto
- Date of birth: 7 December 1989 (age 36)
- Place of birth: Bahia, Brazil
- Height: 1.73 m (5 ft 8 in)
- Position: Midfielder

Team information
- Current team: VSI Tampa Bay
- Number: 4

Senior career*
| Years | Team | Apps | (Gls) |
| 2009–2010 | Ipatinga | 33 | (4) |
| 2011–2012 | AA São Francisco | | |
| 2013– | VSI Tampa Bay | 4 | (1) |
- * Club domestic league appearances and goals as of 4 January 2014

Antonio de Santana Portugal Neto (born 7 December 1989 in Bahia) is a Brazilian footballer who plays as a midfielder for VSI Tampa Bay FC in the USL Pro.

== Career ==
Neto played early with Ipatinga Futebol Clube and Associação Atlética São Francisco De Conde.

=== VSI Tampa Bay ===
Neto signed with VSI Tampa Bay FC in March, 2013. He made his debut for the club on April 2, 2013 where he scored a debut goal in a 1-0 victory over Los Angeles Blues.

== Career statistics ==
=== Club ===
Statistics accurate as of 2 April 2013

| Club | Season | League | | US Open Cup | | CONCACAF | | Other | | Total | |
| Club | Season | Apps | Goals | Apps | Goals | Apps | Goals | Apps | Goals | Apps | Goals |
|---|---|---|---|---|---|---|---|---|---|---|---|
| VSI Tampa Bay | 2013 | 1 | 1 | 0 | 0 | — | — | 0 | 0 | 1 | 1 |
| Career total | | 1 | 1 | 0 | 0 | 0 | 0 | 0 | 0 | 1 | 1 |
