= Ocala Stampede =

- Full name: Ocala Stampede
- Nickname: The Stampede
- Founded: 2011; 15 years ago
- Dissolved: 2015; 11 years ago
- Stadium: MCYFL Stadium at Jervey Gantt Park; Ocala, Florida
- Capacity: 3,000
- League: Premier Development League
- 2015: 1st, Southeast; Playoffs: Southern Conference Champions
- Website: http://www.ocalastampede.com
Home colours	Away colours

Ocala Stampede was an American soccer club based in Ocala, Florida that played in the Premier Development League, the fourth division of the American soccer pyramid.

== History ==
Ocala Stampede was granted a franchise in the PDL on December 28, 2011, and began play in the 2012 PDL season. The Stampede was founded as a Christian sports ministry, much like fellow PDL side, Mississippi Brilla, as well as several other outlets in the Southeastern United States.

2012 Season: The Stampede started off their vibrant history with a bang, going unbeaten in their first four contests (3–0–1). Their first ever victory was over VSI Tampa Bay FC, 4–2 on May 6, 2012. After their momentum was temporarily derailed, a mid-season coaching change (Matt Weston taking over for the departing Anderson DaSilva), helped the team quickly get back on their feet and end the season on another unbeaten streak, this time eight games (7–0–1). This helped propel the team to win the Southeast Division of the PDL Southern Conference, which enabled them to be one of four host cities for the 2012 USL-PDL playoffs (round of 16 and round of 8). Their record was 11 Wins, 3 Losses and 2 Ties. The Stampede was defeated by the Austin Aztex 3–2 in the Conference Semifinals.

2013 Season: Through winning their division in 2012, the Stampede qualified for the 2013 US Open Cup. They defeated Red Force FC 4–2 in the first round on May 14, then lost to USLPro's Orlando City 2–1 on May 21.

The 2013 regular season saw a new coach, former Charlotte Eagles player Cheyne Roberts, and a virtually new roster from top to bottom (all 11 starters were new in 2013). Even with wholesale changeover, the team was again able to make its mark. Their 40 goals scored was tied for 2nd most in the PDL. They again won the PDL Southeast Division title in 2013 with a record of 11 Wins, 3 Losses and no Ties. The Stampede lost to the Laredo Heat 2–0 in the Conference Semifinals.

2014 Season: In 2014 the team continued their division success, netting their 3rd consecutive Southeastern Division Championship. After a slow start to the season (a loss to MLS bound Orlando City in the 1st round of the US Open Cup and a draw and a loss to start the regular season campaign), the team unleashed a 14-game unbeaten streak, which carried into the Southern Conference playoffs, with a defeat of the Laredo Heat in the round of 16 (1–1 AET final [5–3 in PKs]), and a conference clinching victory over the 2013 Defending Champs the Austin Aztex, 2–0 on Austin's home field. The team fell to the Kitsap Pumas 2–1 in the 2014 USL-PDL National Semifinals on August 1, 2014 (Pontiac, MI), ending their overall unbeaten streak. The team however will carry a 12-game regular season unbeaten streak into the 2015 regular season.

2015 Season: 2015 Season: The 2015 season could best be described as a season of 'streaks'. At first it looked as tho all of their 'streaks' would be coming to an end. Their 13-game regular season unbeaten streak was snapped on May 27 by FC Miami City. Their home unbeaten steak, which stretched back to 2013, was snapped on June 27 by SW Florida. But most importantly it looked as tho their streak of division championships (3) would come to an end. A rough patch at the end of June saw them on the outside looking in, not just for the division title, but for a playoff spot altogether.

The team however turned it around in a big way, going undefeated in the month of July (4–0–1), culminating with a winner take all matchup for the division title vs FC Miami City on July 18. Ocala came out victorious and took home their 4th consecutive Southeastern Division Title.

The conference playoffs were held in Clinton, MS and after defeating the Midland Odessa Sockers 1–0, the Stampede's season nemesis FC Miami City was again awaiting, this time the winner would be the 2015 Southern Conference Champion. Ocala was once again able to gain the victory, and extend their streak of Southern Conference Championships to two.

The National Championships will take place in Seattle, WA on July 31 – Aug 2nd of 2015, with Ocala's semi-final opponent the New York Red Bulls U23s.

Overall: In the three-year period since they began play (2012–2014) the Ocala Stampede has been the most successful USL-PDL team during the regular season (alongside the Austin Aztex), totalling 99 points in the standings.

== Year-by-year ==
Year	Division	League	Regular season	Win	Loss	Draw	Playoffs	Open Cup
2012	4	USL PDL	1st, Southeast	11	3	2	Conference Semifinals	Did not qualify
2013	4	USL PDL	1st, Southeast	11	3	0	Conference Semifinals	2nd Round
2014	4	USL PDL	1st, Southeast	9	1	4	National Semifinals	1st Round
2015	4	USL PDL	1st, Southeast	8	3	3	National Semifinals	1st Round

== Achievements ==
- USL PDL Southern Conference Champions 2015
- USL PDL Southeast Division Champions 2015
- USL PDL Southern Conference Champions 2014
- USL PDL Southeast Division Champions 2014
- USL PDL Southeast Division Champions 2013
- USL PDL Southeast Division Champions 2012

== Player honors ==
Year	Pos	Player	Country	Honor
2012	M	Douglas dos Santos	Brazil	All-Conference Team (Southern)
2012	F	Karamba Janneh	(The Gambia) Gambia	All-Conference Team (Southern)
2014	F	Ilija Ilić	Serbia	All-Conference Team (Southern)
2014	D	Ben Knight	England	All-Conference Team (Southern)
2014	F	Karamba Janneh	(The Gambia) Gambia	All-Conference Team (Southern)
2015	M	Lewis Hilton	England	All-Conference Team (Southern)
2015	D	Paco Craig	England	All-Conference Team (Southern)

== Team honors ==
Year	League	Award name	Nominated or Won
2012	USL PDL	Rookie Franchise of the Year Award	Nomination
2012	USL PDL	Betsy McAdams Key Grip Award	Nomination
2013	USL PDL	Broadcast Award	Nomination
2014	USL PDL	Executive of the Year (Bill Reed)	Nomination
2014	USL PDL	Organization of the Year	Nomination

== Managerial history ==
- (Brazil) Anderson DaSilva (2012)
- (England) Matt Weston (2012)
- (United States) Cheyne Roberts (2013–2015)
