= USL Youth =

- Organizing body: United Soccer League
- Founded: 1999
- Country: United States
- Other club from: Canada
- Number of clubs: ~700
- Website: www.usl-youth.com

USL Youth, formerly known as the Super Y League, is a youth soccer league with teams from the United States and Canada. Founded in 1999, the league is affiliated with U.S. Soccer and used to identify potential professional talent. USL Youth contains the youth academies of Major League Soccer, United Soccer League, and Premier Development League clubs.

USL Youth operates the following age groups for boys and girls: U-10, U-11, U-12, U-13, U-14, U-15, U-16, U-17, and U-18/19. From 2006 to 2015, the oldest age group was branded as the Super-20 League. The league was known as the Super Y League until 2024.

== Former clubs ==
Logo from 2016 to 2024, when it was known as the Super Y League.
