= 2011 F.C. New York season =

F.C. New York
2011 season
- Owner: (United States) Jo-Ellen Treiber (United States) Doug Petersen
- Head coach: (England) Paul Shaw (interim)
- Stadium: Belson Stadium
- USL Pro: TBD
- Playoffs: TBD
- U.S. Open Cup: Second Round
- Highest home attendance: 2,011 vs Orlando City 30 April 2011
- Lowest home attendance: 338 vs Rochester 7 August 2011
- Average home league attendance: 841
Home colors	Away colors

The 2011 F.C. New York season was the club's third year of existence, as well as their inaugural season of playing professional soccer. New York will be playing in the USL Professional Division, the third-tier of American soccer.

The club also participated in the 2011 U.S. Open Cup for the first time and made it to the third round, where they were eliminated by the New York Red Bulls.

== Review ==
=== April ===
F.C. New York played their first ever match on the evening of April 9, 2011, against Orlando City. FCNY's away match ended in disaster, losing 3–0 to the Lions.

=== May ===
On May 23, FCNY's head coach, Matt Weston, resigned as head coach of the club. He was replaced by assistant, Paul Shaw. Shaw is to serve as interim head coach for the remainder of the 2011 season.

== Club ==
=== Roster ===
As of June 10, 2011.

Note: Flags indicate national team as defined under FIFA eligibility rules; some limited exceptions apply. Players may hold more than one non-FIFA nationality.

No.	Pos.	Nation	Player
1	GK	USA	Derby Carrillo
2	DF	USA	Brent Brockman
3	DF	CAN	Josiah Snelgrove
4	MF	USA	Kyle Hoffer
5	DF	USA	Karsten Smith
6	MF	IRL	Stephen Roche
7	MF	USA	Gary Boughton
8	DF	USA	Troy Cole
9	FW	CPV	Graciano Brito
10	MF	BRA	Tadeu Terra
11	FW	ENG	Ben Algar
12	MF	USA	Steve Covino
13	GK	USA	Steven Diaz

No.	Pos.	Nation	Player
14	DF	USA	David Reed
15	MF	NIR	Owen Morrison
16	MF	TRI	Quame Holder
17	FW	COL	Jhonny Arteaga
18	MF	USA	Joey Tavernese
19	DF	ENG	Sam Craven
20	MF	ENG	Paul Shaw
22	MF	USA	Erik Rengifo
23	MF	USA	Michele Aquino
32	DF	ENG	Sam Stockley
77	FW	USA	Bradley Welch
00	GK	USA	Tim Melia (on loan from Real Salt Lake)
—	FW	USA	Don Smart

=== Technical staff ===
==== Coaching staff ====
Position	Staff
Technical director	(England) Matt Weston
Assistant coach	TBA
Academy director	TBA
Camp Director	(England) Chris J. Symons

Updated to match played 26 January 2011
Source: F.C. New York

==== Management ====
Owners	(United States) Jo-Ellen Treiber (United States) Doug Petersen
President	(United States) Doug Petersen
Executive Vice President	(United States) Jo-Ellen Treiber
Registrar	(United States) Samantha Treiber
International Head	(Mexico) Javier Cantu
Ground (capacity and dimensions)	Belson Stadium (6,000 / 101.4x65.0 meters)

Updated to match played 26 January 2011
Source: F.C. New York

== USL Pro ==
=== National Division ===
Pos	Team	Pld	W	T	L	GF	GA	GD	Pts	Qualification
1	Rochester Rhinos (A)	24	12	4	8	31	23	+8	40	2011 USL Pro Playoffs (Note: The top four clubs in each division are guaranteed spots in the 2011 USL PRO Playoffs.)
2	Harrisburg City Islanders (A)	24	10	7	7	37	30	+7	37	2011 USL Pro Playoffs
3	Los Angeles Blues (A)	24	8	9	7	34	29	+5	33	2011 USL Pro Playoffs
4	Pittsburgh Riverhounds (A)	24	7	6	11	23	32	−9	27	2011 USL Pro Playoffs
5	F.C. New York	24	6	7	11	27	37	−10	25	
6	Dayton Dutch Lions	24	2	6	16	21	54	−33	12	

Source: USL Pro official standings
Rules for classification: Points, then tiebreak: 1) Head-to-head record based on total points in League games, 2) Total wins in League games, 3) Goal difference in League games, 4) Goals scored in League games, etc.
(A) Advances to USL Pro Playoffs

=== Match results ===
April 9, 2011 Match 1	Orlando City	3–0	F.C. New York	Orlando, Florida
19:35 EDT	Griffin 43', 71'; Alvarez 54'; Stewart (yellow card) 76'; Valentino (yellow card) 90'	(Report)	(yellow card) 37' Shaw; (yellow card) 50' Cole; (yellow card) 80' Brockman	Stadium: Citrus Bowl; Attendance: 7,933; Referee: Fernando Iturriaga

April 23, 2011 Match 2	Charlotte Eagles	0–0	F.C. New York	Charlotte, North Carolina
19:00 EDT		Report	(yellow card) 83' Smith	Stadium: Charlotte Christian Stadium; Attendance: 1,076; Referee: Daniel Burak

April 30, 2011 Match 3	F.C. New York	1–2	Orlando City	Queens, New York
19:30 EDT	Morrison 54'; (yellow card) 27' Cole; (yellow card) 80' Craven	Report	14' Olum; 80' Neal; (yellow card) 57' Fuller; (yellow card) 90' Boden	Stadium: Belson Stadium; Attendance: 2,011; Referee: Hernan Aguilar

May 7, 2011 Match 4	F.C. New York	1–1	Harrisburg City	Queens, New York
19:30 EDT	Hoffer 10'	Report	16' Angulo	Stadium: Belson Stadium; Referee: Robert Sibiger

May 13, 2011 Match 5	Charleston Battery	0–1	F.C. New York	Charleston, South Carolina
19:30 EDT		Report	35' Brito	Stadium: Blackbaud Stadium; Attendance: 3,328; Referee: Robert Joyner

May 14, 2011 Match 6	Wilmington Hammerheads	3–1	F.C. New York	Wilmington, North Carolina
19:30 EDT	Banks 15' 19'; Noviello 90'	Report	17' Brito	Stadium: Legion Stadium; Attendance: 4,279; Referee: Brandon Marion

May 21, 2011 Match 7	Pittsburgh Riverhounds	2–0	F.C. New York	Bridgeville, Pennsylvania
19:00 EDT	Deighton; Fondy 48'	Report		Stadium: CVHS Stadium; Attendance: 1,421; Referee: Steve Montanino

May 28, 2011 Match 8	Richmond Kickers	2–2	F.C. New York	Richmond, Virginia
19:00 EDT	Heins 37'; Nyazamba 53'	Report	52' 79' Brito	Stadium: City Stadium; Attendance: 2,545; Referee: Jim Sadowski

May 30, 2011 Match 9	F.C. New York	2–1	Rochester Rhinos	Queens, New York
15:00 EDT	Holder 29'; Arteaga 45'	Report	57' Alesci	Stadium: Belson Stadium; Attendance: 1,030; Referee: Ayo Obisesan

June 3, 2011 Match 10	F.C. New York	1–1	Charleston Battery	Queens, New York
19:30 EDT	Brito 58'	Report	45' Patterson	Stadium: Belson Stadium; Attendance: 1,014; Referee: Nabil Al-Saidi

June 10, 2011 Match 11	F.C. New York	3–0	Dayton Dutch Lions	Queens, New York
19:30 EDT		Report		Stadium: Belson Stadium

June 12, 2011 Match 12	F.C. New York	0–2	Richmond Kickers	Queens, New York
19:30 EDT		Report	45' Elcock; 45' Delicâte	Stadium: Belson Stadium; Attendance: 479; Referee: Hakan Baydere

July 1, 2011 Match 13	F.C. New York	2–0	Antigua Barracuda FC	Queens, New York
19:30 EDT	Arteaga; Arteaga	Report		Stadium: Belson Stadium; Attendance: 1,653; Referee: Nabil Al-saibi

July 4, 2011 Match 14	F.C. New York	1–3	Charlotte Eagles	Queens, New York
19:30 EDT	Arteaga 84'	Report	Herrera 9'; Sanchez 22'; Own goal 34'	Stadium: Belson Stadium; Attendance: 574; Referee: Saam Jalayer

July 8, 2011 Match 15	Rochester Rhinos	3–1	F.C. New York	Rochester, New York
20:00 EDT	Ferdinand 4'; Jagdeosingh 13'; Rosenlund 40'	Report	Hoffer 44'	Stadium: Sahlen's Stadium; Attendance: 5,176; Referee: Andrew Evangelos

July 9, 2011 Match 16	Pittsburgh Riverhounds	2–1	F.C. New York	Bridgeville, Pennsylvania
19:00 EDT	Flunder 59'; Lundberg 83'	Report	Arteaga 85'	Stadium: CVHS Stadium; Attendance: 937; Referee: Shawn Fitch

July 16, 2011 Match 17	F.C. New York	1–1	Pittsburgh Riverhounds	Queens, New York
15:00 EDT	Holder	Report	Shaffer	Stadium: Belson Stadium; Attendance: 512; Referee: Yevgeniy Mednikov

July 29, 2011 Match 18	F.C. New York	1–3	Wilmington Hammerheads	Queens, New York
19:30 EDT	Arteaga 56'	Report	Budnyi 29'; Mulholland 52', 62'	Stadium: Belson Stadium; Attendance: 375; Referee: Guido Gonzalez

August 5, 2011 Match 19	Harrisburg City	0–0	F.C. New York	Queens, New York
19:00 EDT	Schofield (yellow card) 14'; Ackley (yellow card) 73'	Report	Smith (yellow card) 29'; Terra (yellow card) 73'	Stadium: Belson Stadium; Attendance: 1,733; Referee: Eric Weisbrod

August 7, 2011 Match 20	F.C. New York	2–1	Rochester Rhinos	Queens, New York
2:00 EDT	Arteaga 17'; Turizo 43'	Report	Kissi 71'	Stadium: Belson Stadium; Attendance: 338; Referee: Saam Jalayer

August 10, 2011 Match 21	Dayton Dutch Lions	0–5	F.C. New York	Bellbrook, Ohio
19:30 EDT		Report	Arteaga 16', 69', 86', 88'; Cole 61'	Stadium: MVS Stadium; Attendance: 700

== U.S. Open Cup ==
June 14, 2011 R1	F.C. New York	3–0	Western Mass Pioneers	Queens, New York
19:30	Arteaga 40' 48' 79'	Report		Stadium: Met Oval; Referee: Ryan Dos Reis

June 21, 2011 R2	F.C. New York	0–0 (a.e.t.)	NY Pancyprian-Freedoms	Queens, New York
19:30		Report		Stadium: Met Oval
	Penalties
	Cole (penalty scored); Arteaga (penalty scored); Snelgrove (penalty missed); Morrison (penalty scored); Terra (penalty scored); Aquino (penalty scored); Smith (penalty scored)		Dimitrov (penalty missed); Koutsounadis (penalty scored); Simos (penalty scored); Zisimatos (penalty scored); Halkidis (penalty scored); Damiani (penalty scored); Julio Cesar (penalty missed)

June 28, 2011 R3	NY Red Bulls	2–1	F.C. New York	Harrison, New Jersey
20:00	Hertzog 58'; Rooney 65'	Report	Morrison 56'	Stadium: Red Bull Arena; Attendance: 2,074; Referee: Jose Carlos Rivero
