= 2011 U.S. Open Cup =

2011 Lamar Hunt U.S. Open Cup
Tournament details
- Country: United States
- Teams: 40

Final positions
- Champions: Seattle Sounders FC (3rd title)
- Runners-up: Chicago Fire
- 2012–13 CONCACAF Champions League: Seattle Sounders FC

Tournament statistics
- Top goal scorer(s): David Bulow (6)

The 2011 Lamar Hunt U.S. Open Cup was the 98th edition of the USSF's annual national soccer championship, running from June through early October. Seattle Sounders FC, who entered the competition as the two-time defending champions, successfully defended their title again. They became the third team in U.S. Open Cup history to win three straight U.S. Open Cups (the others being Stix, Baer and Fuller/St. Louis Central Breweries from 1933 to 1935 and Greek American AA from 1967 to 1969 — this excludes the run of Fall River F.C. in 1930 and 1931, as the team that won in 1932, New Bedford Whalers, was the result of mergers of teams that included Fall River). As winner of the Open Cup, the Sounders earned a place in the 2012–13 CONCACAF Champions League Group stage (the preliminary round will be eliminated from the CONCACAF Champions League starting from 2012–13). The farthest advancing USL Pro team was the Richmond Kickers.

Like the previous edition, the Open Cup featured 40 clubs from across the five tiers of the American soccer pyramid. This season, due to late provisional sanctioning, the North American Soccer League was not allowed to send its clubs to the tournament. The event featured eight clubs from Major League Soccer, with six automatically qualifying based on their league position in the 2010 season and two qualifying through a play-in tournament. They entered the tournament in the third round. All 11 USL Pro League clubs based in the United States, nine clubs from the USL Premier Development League, four clubs from the National Premier Soccer League, and eight United States Adult Soccer Association qualifiers began play in the first round.

== Dates ==
Date	Round	Notes
June 14	First round	11 USL Pro, 9 USL PDL, 4 NPSL, and 8 USASA clubs enter
June 21	Second round	
June 28	Third round	8 MLS clubs enter
July 12	Quarterfinals	
August 30	Semifinals	
October 4	Final	

== Participating teams ==
The tournament consisted of 40 teams, according to the following distribution:

Major League Soccer (8 teams)

- Chicago Fire
- Columbus Crew
- FC Dallas
- Los Angeles Galaxy
- New York Red Bulls
- Real Salt Lake
- Seattle Sounders FC
- Sporting Kansas City

North American Soccer League (0 teams)

- On February 17, 2011, the USSF announced that no NASL teams will be participating in the competition since the league did not obtain provisional sanctioning in time.

USL Pro League (11 teams)

- Charleston Battery
- Charlotte Eagles
- Dayton Dutch Lions
- Harrisburg City Islanders
- Los Angeles Blues
- F.C. New York
- Orlando City
- Pittsburgh Riverhounds
- Richmond Kickers
- Rochester Rhinos
- Wilmington Hammerheads

Premier Development League (9 teams)

- Carolina Dynamo
- Central Florida Kraze
- Chicago Fire Premier
- Chivas El Paso Patriots
- Kitsap Pumas
- Reading United
- Real Colorado Foxes
- Ventura County Fusion
- Western Mass Pioneers

National Premier Soccer League (4 teams)

- Brooklyn Italians
- Chattanooga FC
- Hollywood United Hitmen
- Madison 56ers

USASA (8 teams)

- A.A.C. Eagles
- Doxa Italia
- DV8 Defenders
- Iowa Menace
- ASC New Stars
- New York Pancyprian-Freedoms
- Phoenix SC
- Regals FC

== Open Cup Bracket ==
First round
NY Pancyprian-Freedoms	2
Brooklyn Italians	1
F.C. New York	3
Western Mass Pioneers	0
Harrisburg City Islanders	6
Reading United	5
Rochester Rhinos	6
Phoenix SC	5
Pittsburgh Riverhounds	3 (AET)
Chattanooga FC	2
Richmond Kickers	4
Dayton Dutch Lions	1
Carolina Dynamo	1
Charlotte Eagles	3
Wilmington Hammerheads	4
Central Florida Kraze	0
Orlando City	4
ASC New Stars	0
Charleston Battery	2
Regals FC	0
Madison 56ers	4
A.A.C. Eagles	0
Iowa Menace	0
Chicago Fire Premier	1
Real Colorado Foxes	5
DV8 Defenders	0
Chivas El Paso Patriots	0 (5)
Kitsap Pumas	0 (6)
Los Angeles Blues	3
Hollywood United Hitmen	1
Ventura County Fusion	3
Doxa Italia	1

Second round
NY Pancyprian-Freedoms	0 (5)
F.C. New York	0 (6)
Harrisburg City Islanders	0
Rochester Rhinos	1
Richmond Kickers	4
Pittsburgh Riverhounds	1
Wilmington Hammerheads	3 (AET)
Charlotte Eagles	2
Charleston Battery	0
Orlando City	1
Madison 56ers	0
Chicago Fire Premier	2
Kitsap Pumas	3
Real Colorado Foxes	1
Ventura County Fusion	0
Los Angeles Blues	1

Third round
New York Red Bulls	2
F.C. New York	1
Rochester Rhinos	0
Chicago Fire	1
Columbus Crew	1
Richmond Kickers	2
Sporting Kansas City	3
Chicago Fire Premier	0
FC Dallas	3
Orlando City	2
Real Salt Lake	2
Wilmington Hammerheads	0
Seattle Sounders FC	2
Kitsap Pumas	1
Los Angeles Galaxy	2
Los Angeles Blues	1

Quarterfinals
Chicago Fire	4
New York Red Bulls	0
Sporting Kansas City	0
Richmond Kickers	2
FC Dallas	2
Real Salt Lake	0
Seattle Sounders FC	3
Los Angeles Galaxy	1

Semifinals
Chicago Fire	2
Richmond Kickers	1
Seattle Sounders FC	1
FC Dallas	0

Final
Seattle Sounders FC	2
Chicago Fire	0

Home teams listed on top of bracket. (AET): After Extra Time

== Schedule ==
Note: Scorelines use the standard U.S. convention of placing the home team on the right-hand side of box scores.

=== First round ===
June 14, 2011	Western Mass Pioneers (PDL)	0–3	F.C. New York (USL Pro)	Maspeth, New York
7:00 PM EDT		Report	Arteaga 40', 48', 79'	Stadium: Met Oval; Referee: Ryan Dos Reis

June 14, 2011	Reading United (PDL)	1–2	Harrisburg City Islanders (USL Pro)	Harrisburg, Pennsylvania
7:00 PM EDT	Rodriguez 35'	Report	Noone 86'; Touray 90'	Stadium: Skyline Sports Complex; Referee: Eric Weisbrod

June 14, 2011	Chattanooga FC (NPSL)	2–3 (a.e.t.)	Pittsburgh Riverhounds (USL Pro)	Bridgeville, Pennsylvania
7:00 PM EDT	Heredia 14'; Beattie 55'	Report	Yeisley 79'; Lundberg 89'; Deighton 99'	Stadium: Chartiers Valley Stadium; Referee: Vito Testa, Jr.

June 14, 2011	Dayton Dutch Lions (USL Pro)	1–4	Richmond Kickers (USL Pro)	Richmond, Virginia
7:00 EDT	van der Pluijm 59'	Report	Bulow 7', 17', 65' (pen.); Bangura 90'	Stadium: City Stadium; Attendance: 722; Referee: Andrew Chapin

June 14, 2011	Charlotte Eagles (USL Pro)	3–1	Carolina Dynamo (PDL)	Browns Summit, North Carolina
7:00 PM EDT	Toby 23'; Martins 49'; Sanchez 85'	Report	Lovejoy 39'	Stadium: Macpherson Stadium; Referee: Brandon Marion

June 14, 2011	Brooklyn Italians (NPSL)	1–2	NY Pancyprian-Freedoms (USASA)	Jamaica, New York
7:30 PM EDT	Samuel 80'	Report	Dimitrov 66'; Andreou 81'	Stadium: Belson Stadium; Referee: Robert Sibiga

June 14, 2011	Central Florida Kraze (PDL)	0–4	Wilmington Hammerheads (USL Pro)	Wilmington, North Carolina
7:30 PM EDT		Report	Noviello 33'; Mulholland 42'; Budnyi 70', 73'	Stadium: Legion Stadium; Referee: Daniel Burak

June 14, 2011	ASC New Stars (USASA)	0–4	Orlando City (USL Pro)	Orlando, Florida
7:30 PM EDT		Report	Jorsling 27', 77'; Molino 42'; Chin 60'	Stadium: UCF Soccer and Track Stadium; Attendance: 1,139; Referee: Kian Attai

June 14, 2011	Regals FC (USASA)	0–2	Charleston Battery (USL Pro)	Charleston, South Carolina
7:30 PM EDT		Report	Paterson 47' (pen.); Kelly 78'	Stadium: Blackbaud Stadium; Attendance: 1,761; Referee: Skye Arthur-Banning

June 14, 2011	Phoenix SC (USASA)	1–2	Rochester Rhinos (USL Pro)	Rochester, New York
7:35 PM EDT	Rowling 71'	Report Report	Banks 27'; Hamilton 55' (pen.)	Stadium: Sahlen's Stadium; Attendance: 2,156; Referee: Steve Montanino

June 14, 2011	A.A.C. Eagles (USASA)	0–4	Madison 56ers (NPSL)	Madison, Wisconsin
7:00 PM CDT		Report	Rampa 67'; Hohlbein 72', 76'; Lysak 81'	Stadium: Breese Stevens Field; Attendance: 702; Referee: Kyle Trimble

June 14, 2011	Chicago Fire Premier (PDL)	1–0	Iowa Menace (USASA)	West Des Moines, Iowa
7:30 PM CDT	Estridge 87'	Report Report 2		Stadium: Valley Stadium; Attendance: 1,559; Referee: Kevin Mesman

June 14, 2011	Hollywood United Hitmen (NPSL)	1–3	Los Angeles Blues (USL Pro)	Norco, California
5:30 PM PDT	Miranda 67'	Report	Momeni 37', 55'; Bravo 90'	Stadium: Riverside Community College; Referee: Maurizio Laudani

June 14, 2011	DV8 Defenders (USASA)	0–5	Real Colorado Foxes (PDL)	Highlands Ranch, Colorado
7:00 PM MDT		Report	Kemp 33'; Schafer 37'; Christensen 42'; Copeland 47'; Thompson 87'	Stadium: Shea Stadium; Referee: Younes Marrakchi

June 14, 2011	Kitsap Pumas (PDL)	0–0 (a.e.t.) (6–5 p)	Chivas El Paso Patriots (PDL)	El Paso, Texas
8:00 PM MDT		Report		Stadium: Patriot Stadium; Attendance: 1,500; Referee: Jason Rector
	Penalties
	Christner (penalty missed); Hyde (penalty missed); Mohn (penalty scored); Gray (penalty scored); Fauske (penalty scored); Andre (penalty missed); Lee (penalty scored); Besagno (penalty scored); Burke (penalty scored)		(penalty scored) Cervantes; (penalty missed) Griego; (penalty scored) de Anda; (penalty missed) Samano; (penalty scored) Morín; (penalty missed) Tena; (penalty scored) Landa; (penalty scored) Briseno; (penalty missed) unknown

June 14, 2011	Doxa Italia (USASA)	1–3	Ventura County Fusion (PDL)	Ventura, California
7:05 PM PDT	Byrne 5'	Report	Rose 33'; Magee 43'; Williams 78'	Stadium: Ventura College; Attendance: 340; Referee: Reed Christy

=== Second round ===
June 21, 2011	Rochester Rhinos (USL Pro)	1–0	Harrisburg City Islanders (USL Pro)	Harrisburg, Pennsylvania
7:00 PM EDT	Donatelli 88' (pen.)	Report		Stadium: Skyline Sports Complex; Referee: Ian Bongaardt

June 21, 2011	Pittsburgh Riverhounds (USL Pro)	1–4	Richmond Kickers (USL Pro)	Richmond, Virginia
7:00 PM EDT	Severs 30'	Report	Bulow 17', 41'; Delicâte 52', 81'	Stadium: City Stadium; Attendance: 1,161; Referee: Jim Sadowski

June 21, 2011	NY Pancyprian-Freedoms (USASA)	0–0 (a.e.t.) (5–6 p)	F.C. New York (USL Pro)	Jamaica, New York
7:30 PM EDT		Report		Stadium: Belson Stadium; Referee: Ken Henriques
	Penalties
	Dimitrov (penalty missed); Koutsounadis (penalty scored); Simos (penalty scored); Zisimatos (penalty scored); Halkidis (penalty scored); Damiani (penalty scored); Julio Cesar (penalty missed)		(penalty scored) Cole; (penalty scored) Arteaga; (penalty missed) Snelgrove; (penalty scored) Morrison; (penalty scored) Terra; (penalty scored) Aquino; (penalty scored) Smith

June 21, 2011	Charlotte Eagles (USL Pro)	2–3 (a.e.t.)	Wilmington Hammerheads (USL Pro)	Wilmington, North Carolina
7:30 PM EDT	Roberts 44'; Toby 54'	Report	Budnyi 63'; Banks 78'; Mulholland 103'	Stadium: Legion Stadium; Referee: Daniel Fitzgerald

June 21, 2011	Orlando City (USL Pro)	1–0	Charleston Battery (USL Pro)	Charleston, South Carolina
7:30 EDT	Valentino 39'	Report		Stadium: Blackbaud Stadium; Referee: Patrick Baker

June 21, 2011	Real Colorado Foxes (PDL)	1–3	Kitsap Pumas (PDL)	Bremerton, Washington
7:00 PM PDT	Mohn 17' (o.g.)	Report	Hepple 17'; Christner 43', 88'	Stadium: Bremerton Memorial Stadium; Attendance: 1,298; Referee: Ronald Lagraff

June 21, 2011	Los Angeles Blues (USL Pro)	1–0	Ventura County Fusion (PDL)	Ventura, California
7:05 PM PDT	Sesay 45'	Report		Stadium: Ventura College; Referee: Daniel Radford

June 22, 2011	Chicago Fire Premier (PDL)	2–0	Madison 56ers (NPSL)	Madison, Wisconsin
7:00 PM CDT	Ribeiro 66'; Zahui 68'	Report		Stadium: Breese Stevens Field; Referee: Margaret Domka

=== Third round ===
June 28, 2011	Richmond Kickers (USL Pro)	2–1	Columbus Crew (MLS)	Columbus, Ohio
7:30 PM EDT	Hiroyama 22'; Delicâte 85'	Report	Grossman 35'	Stadium: Columbus Crew Stadium; Attendance: 1,845; Referee: Sorin Stoica (Ohio)

June 28, 2011	Chicago Fire (MLS)	1–0	Rochester Rhinos (USL Pro)	Rochester, New York
7:35 PM EDT	Chaves 37'	Report		Stadium: Sahlen's Stadium; Attendance: 5,558; Referee: Daniel Fitzgerald (North Carolina)

June 28, 2011	F.C. New York (USL Pro)	1–2	New York Red Bulls (MLS)	Harrison, New Jersey
8:00 PM EDT	Morrison 56'	Report	Hertzog 58'; Rooney 65'	Stadium: Red Bull Arena; Attendance: 2,074; Referee: Jose Carlos Rivero (New York)

June 28, 2011	Chicago Fire Premier (PDL)	0–3	Sporting Kansas City (MLS)	Kansas City, Kansas
7:30 PM CDT		Report	Bunbury 3'; Stojčev 58'; Kamara 59'	Stadium: Livestrong Sporting Park; Attendance: 4,487; Referee: Landis Wiley (Iowa)

June 28, 2011	Orlando City (USL Pro)	2–3	FC Dallas (MLS)	Frisco, Texas
8:00 PM CDT	Griffin 20'; Álvarez 90+'	Report	Jackson 38'; Villar 50'; Rodríguez 90+'	Stadium: Pizza Hut Park; Attendance: 1,876; Referee: Armando Villarreal (Texas)

June 28, 2011	Wilmington Hammerheads (USL Pro)	0–2	Real Salt Lake (MLS)	Sandy, Utah
7:00 PM MDT		Report	Beltran 40'; Alexandre 44'	Stadium: Rio Tinto Stadium; Attendance: 7,620; Referee: Allen Chapman (Utah)

June 28, 2011	Kitsap Pumas (PDL)	1–2	Seattle Sounders FC (MLS)	Tukwila, Washington
7:00 PM PDT	Besagno 71'	Report	Fucito 39', 62'	Stadium: Starfire Sports Complex; Attendance: 3,811; Referee: Tyler Ploeger (Utah)

June 28, 2011	Los Angeles Blues (USL Pro)	1–2	Los Angeles Galaxy (MLS)	Fullerton, California
7:30 PM PDT	Rivera 62'	Report	Gonzalez 75'; Magee 81'	Stadium: Titan Stadium; Attendance: 3,627; Referee: Alejandro Mariscal (California)

=== Quarterfinals ===
July 12, 2011	New York Red Bulls (MLS)	0–4	Chicago Fire (MLS)	Bridgeview, Illinois
5:30 PM CDT (Rescheduled from 7:30 PM CDT due to power outage)		Report	Oduro 7'; Cuesta 49'; Barouch 52', 69'	Stadium: Toyota Park; Referee: Hilario Grajeda (Ohio)

July 12, 2011	Richmond Kickers (USL Pro)	2–0	Sporting Kansas City (MLS)	Kansas City, Kansas
7:30 PM CDT	Bangura 66'; Bulow 87' (pen.)	Report		Stadium: Livestrong Sporting Park; Attendance: 4,794; Referee: Mark Kadlecik (North Carolina)

July 12, 2011	Real Salt Lake (MLS)	0–2	FC Dallas (MLS)	Frisco, Texas
8:00 PM CDT		Report	Benítez 18'; Jackson 54'	Stadium: Pizza Hut Park; Referee: Michael Kennedy (Wisconsin)

July 13, 2011	Los Angeles Galaxy (MLS)	1–3	Seattle Sounders FC (MLS)	Tukwila, Washington
7:00 PM PDT	Cristman 37'	Report	Jaqua 4'; Montero 25'; Neagle 74'	Stadium: Starfire Sports Complex; Attendance: 4,322; Referee: Kevin Stott (California)

=== Semifinals ===
August 30, 2011	Richmond Kickers (USL Pro)	1–2	Chicago Fire (MLS)	Bridgeview, Illinois
7:30 PM CDT	William 68'	Report	Grazzini 32'; Oduro 61'	Stadium: Toyota Park; Attendance: 8,909; Referee: Jasen Anno (Texas)

August 30, 2011	FC Dallas (MLS)	0–1	Seattle Sounders FC (MLS)	Tukwila, Washington
7:00 PM PDT		Report	Montero 40'	Stadium: Starfire Sports Complex; Attendance: 4,593; Referee: Hilario Grajeda (Ohio)

=== Final ===
October 4, 2011
7:00 PM PDT

Chicago Fire (MLS)	0–2	Seattle Sounders FC (MLS)
	Report	Montero 77'; Alonso 90+6'

CenturyLink Field, Seattle
Attendance: 35,615
Referee: Alex Prus (South Carolina)

== Top scorers ==
Statistics current as of 4 October 2011

Rank	Scorer	Club	Goals
1	(United States) David Bulow	Richmond Kickers	6
2	(Colombia) Jhonny Arteaga	F.C. New York	3
2	(Ukraine) Andriy Budnyi	Wilmington Hammerheads	3
2	(England) Matthew Delicâte	Richmond Kickers	3
2	(Colombia) Fredy Montero	Seattle Sounders FC	3
6	(Trinidad and Tobago) Darren Toby	Charlotte Eagles	2
6	(Israel) Orr Barouch	Chicago Fire	2
6	(Ghana) Dominic Oduro	Chicago Fire	2
6	(Brazil) Jackson	FC Dallas	2
6	(United States) Robbie Christner	Kitsap Pumas	2
6	(Iran) Mehrshad Momeni	Los Angeles Blues	2
6	(United States) Jed Hohlbein	Madison 56ers	2
6	(Bulgaria) Stefan Dimitrov	New York Pancyprian-Freedoms	2
6	(Trinidad and Tobago) Devorn Jorsling	Orlando City	2
6	(Sierra Leone) Shaka Bangura	Richmond Kickers	2
6	(United States) Mike Fucito	Seattle Sounders FC	2
6	(England) Luke Mulholland	Wilmington Hammerheads	2
