= 2011 Wilmington Hammerheads FC season =

Wilmington Hammerheads
2011 season
- Owner: Bill Rudisill
- Head coach: David Irving
- Stadium: Sahlen's Stadium
- USL Pro: Division: 6th Overall: 9th
- Playoffs: TBD
- U.S. Open Cup: Third Round
- Highest home attendance: 5,127 vs Charleston 24 June 2011
- Lowest home attendance: 1,924 vs Rochester 17 April 2011
- Average home league attendance: 3,926
Home colors	Away colors

The 2011 season was the Wilmington Hammerheads' 16th season in existence and their second-consecutive year playing in the third division of American soccer, following a hiatus in 2009. This year marks the club's debut in the newly created USL Pro League.

== Review and events ==
The club was on a hiatus in 2010, and returned to fielding a professional side this year. They joined the USL Pro, and were allocated into the National Division, which primarily consisted of Southern clubs.

The club signed four players from Ventura County Fusion on March 2, 2011: Dylan Riley, Ivan Becerra, Manny Guzman, and Jack Avesyan.

== Match results ==
=== U.S. Open Cup ===
June 14, 2011 R1	Wilmington Hammerheads	4–0	Central Florida Kraze	Wilmington, North Carolina
	Noviello 33'; Mulholland 42'; Budnyi 70' 73'	Report		Stadium: Legion Stadium; Referee: Daniel Burek

June 21, 2011 R2	Wilmington Hammerheads	3–2 (a.e.t.)	Charlotte Eagles	Wilmington, North Carolina
19:00 EDT	Budnyi 63'; Banks 78'; Mulholland 103'	Report	Roberts 44'; Toby 54'	Stadium: Legion Stadium; Referee: Daniel Fitzgerald

June 28, 2011 R3	Real Salt Lake	2–0	Wilmington Hammerheads	Sandy, Utah
21:00 EDT	Beltran 40'; Alexandre 44'	Report		Stadium: Rio Tinto Stadium; Attendance: 7,620; Referee: Allen Chapman

== Club ==
=== Roster ===
As of June 10, 2011.

Note: Flags indicate national team as defined under FIFA eligibility rules; some limited exceptions apply. Players may hold more than one non-FIFA nationality.

No.	Pos.	Nation	Player
2	DF	ENG	Jamie Scope
3	DF	ENG	Chris Spendlove
4	MF	ENG	Tom Taylor
5	DF	MEX	Ivan Becerra
6	MF	USA	Manny Guzman
7	FW	USA	Tanner Wolfe
8	MF	ENG	Luke Mulholland
9	MF	USA	Richard Jata
10	FW	USA	Andres Cuero
11	FW	UKR	Andriy Budnyi
12	DF	SCO	Tom Parratt
13	MF	USA	Chris Murray

No.	Pos.	Nation	Player
14	MF	USA	Jyler Noviello
15	FW	USA	Devan Carroll
17	DF	USA	Dylan Riley
18	FW	USA	Chris Banks
19	MF	ENG	Paul Nicholson
21	MF	USA	Alex Grendi
22	MF	ARM	Jack Avesyan
23	DF	WAL	Gareth Evans (captain)
25	MF	USA	Diego Barrera
26	GK	USA	Brock Duckworth
30	GK	USA	Kyle Polak

=== Management and staff ===
- (England) David Irving - Head Coach/Director of Soccer Operations
- (United States) Roxanne DeMonte - Game Day Operations

== League standings ==
=== American Division ===
Pos	Team	Pld	W	T	L	GF	GA	GD	Pts	Qualification
1	Orlando City SC (C)	24	15	6	3	36	16	+20	51	2011 USL Pro Commissioner's Cup, 2011 USL Pro Playoffs
2	Wilmington Hammerheads (A)	24	14	3	7	42	30	+12	45	2011 USL Pro Playoffs (Note: The top four clubs in each division are guaranteed spots in the 2011 USL Pro Playoffs.)
3	Richmond Kickers (A)	24	12	5	7	35	21	+14	41	2011 USL Pro Playoffs
4	Charleston Battery (A)	24	10	5	9	24	25	−1	35	2011 USL Pro Playoffs
5	Charlotte Eagles	24	9	6	9	32	29	+3	33	
6	Antigua Barracuda	24	9	2	13	32	32	0	29	

Source: USL Pro official standings
Rules for classification: Points, then tiebreak: 1) Head-to-head record based on total points in League games, 2) Total wins in League games, 3) Goal difference in League games, 4) Goals scored in League games, etc.
(A) Advances to USL Pro Playoffs; (C) Commissioner's Cup (best regular season record)

== Statistics ==
Nat	No.	Player	Pos	MP	MS	G	A	Booked	Sent off (straight red)	Acquired	Salary
(United States)	2	Jordan Harvey	DF	15	15	0	1	3	1	Expansion Draft	$63,125

Updated to match played June 24, 2011
Source: Charlotte Eagles

== Transfers ==
=== In ===
#	Date	Player	Pos.	Previous club	Transfer type	Fee/notes	Ref.
22	March 2, 2011	(Armenia) Jack Avesyan	MF	(United States) Ventura County Fusion	Free	Did not renew contract. Signed with club on free transfer.
5	March 2, 2011	(Mexico) Ivan Becerra	DF	(United States) Ventura County Fusion	Free	Did not renew contract. Signed with club on free transfer.
6	March 2, 2011	(United States) Manny Guzman	MF	(United States) Ventura County Fusion	Free	Did not renew contract. Signed with club on free transfer.
17	March 2, 2011	(United States) Dylan Riley	DF	(United States) Ventura County Fusion	Free	Did not renew contract. Signed with club on free transfer.
2	March 7, 2011	(England) Jamie Scope	DF	(United States) UIW Cardinals	Free	Graduated from UIW. Signed with club on free transfer.
13	March 7, 2011	(United States) Chris Murray	MF	Unattached	Free	Signed with club as a free agent.
14	March 7, 2011	(United States) Jyler Noviello	MF	(United States) Real Maryland Monarchs	Free	Did not renew contract. Signed with club on free transfer.
12	March 12, 2011	(Scotland) Tom Parratt	DF	(Scotland) Airdrie United	Free	Released by Airdrie. Signed with club on free transfer.

== Awards ==
None.

== See also ==
- 2011 USL Pro season
- 2011 U.S. Open Cup
- 2011 in American soccer
- Wilmington Hammerheads
