= 2011 Charlotte Eagles season =

Charlotte Eagles
2011 season
- Owner: Pat Stewart
- Head coach: Mark Steffens
- Stadium: Charlotte Christian School
- USL Pro: Division: 5th Overall: 8th
- Playoffs: TBD
- U.S. Open Cup: First Round
- Highest home attendance: 1,179 vs Richmond 9 July 2011
- Lowest home attendance: 854 vs Orlando City 16 April 2011
- Average home league attendance: 1,028
Home colors	Away colors

The 2011 Charlotte Eagles season, is the club's 20th season in existence, and their eighth-consecutive year playing in the third division of American soccer. This year marks the club's debut in the newly created USL Pro League, an agglomeration of the defunct USL First and Second Divisions.

== Match results ==
=== U.S. Open Cup ===
June 14, 2011 R1	Carolina Dynamo	1–3	Charlotte Eagles	Browns Summit, North Carolina
18:05 EDT	Lovejoy 39'	Report	Toby 23'; Martins 49'; Sanchez 85'	Stadium: Macpherson Stadium

June 21, 2011 R2	Wilmington Hammerheads	3–2 (a.e.t.)	Charlotte Eagles	Wilmington, North Carolina
19:00 EDT	Budnyi 63'; Banks 78'; Mulholland 103'	Report	Roberts 44'; Toby 54'	Stadium: Legion Stadium; Referee: Daniel Fitzgerald

== Club ==
=== Roster ===
As of June 2, 2011.

Note: Flags indicate national team as defined under FIFA eligibility rules; some limited exceptions apply. Players may hold more than one non-FIFA nationality.

No.	Pos.	Nation	Player
0	GK	USA	Corbin Waller
2	DF	USA	Cheyne Roberts
3	DF	USA	Mark Bloom
4	DF	USA	Brady Bryant (captain)
5	MF	ENG	Joe Connor
6	MF	USA	Greg Dalby
7	FW	USA	Chris Salvaggione
8	MF	BRA	Diego Martins
9	FW	SLE	Sallieu Bundu (on loan from Carolina)
10	MF	COL	Jorge Herrera
11	MF	USA	Luke Williams

No.	Pos.	Nation	Player
12	MF	USA	Juan Guzman
13	FW	USA	Gibson Bardsley
14	MF	USA	Alan Sanchez
15	DF	GUY	Walter Moore (on loan from Caledonia AIA)
18	MF	USA	Ben Page
19	MF	CUB	Miguel Ferrer
21	MF	TRI	Darren Toby
22	GK	USA	Patrick Mitrovich
23	DF	USA	Chad Smith
24	GK	USA	Eric Reed
29	MF	USA	Josh Rife

=== Management and staff ===
- (United States) Pat Stewart - President
- (United States) Tom Engstrom - General Manager
- (United States) Mark Steffens - Head Coach
- (Zimbabwe) Patrick Daka - Assistant Coach
- (England) Kevin Sephton - Assistant Coach
- (United States) Steve Shak - Assistant Coach
- (United States) Ryan Souders - Goalkeeper Coach
- (United States) Allan Courtright - Director of Operations

== League standings ==
=== American Division ===
Pos	Team	Pld	W	T	L	GF	GA	GD	Pts	Qualification
1	Orlando City SC (C)	24	15	6	3	36	16	+20	51	2011 USL Pro Commissioner's Cup, 2011 USL Pro Playoffs
2	Wilmington Hammerheads (A)	24	14	3	7	42	30	+12	45	2011 USL Pro Playoffs (Note: The top four clubs in each division are guaranteed spots in the 2011 USL Pro Playoffs.)
3	Richmond Kickers (A)	24	12	5	7	35	21	+14	41	2011 USL Pro Playoffs
4	Charleston Battery (A)	24	10	5	9	24	25	−1	35	2011 USL Pro Playoffs
5	Charlotte Eagles	24	9	6	9	32	29	+3	33	
6	Antigua Barracuda	24	9	2	13	32	32	0	29	

Source: USL Pro official standings
Rules for classification: Points, then tiebreak: 1) Head-to-head record based on total points in League games, 2) Total wins in League games, 3) Goal difference in League games, 4) Goals scored in League games, etc.
(A) Advances to USL Pro Playoffs; (C) Commissioner's Cup (best regular season record)

== Statistics ==
Nat	No.	Player	Pos	MP	MS	G	A	Booked	Sent off (straight red)	Acquired	Salary
(United States)	2	Jordan Harvey	DF	15	15	0	1	3	1	Expansion Draft	$63,125

* = Not currently part of team.

|} Updated to match played June 24, 2011
Source: Charlotte Eagles

== Transfers ==
=== In ===
#	Date	Player	Pos.	Previous club	Transfer type	Fee/notes	Ref.
No.	March 14, 2011	(South Africa) Player	MF	(United States) Club Name Here	Free	Did not renew contract. Signed with club on free transfer.

== Awards ==
None.

== See also ==
- 2011 USL Pro season
- 2011 U.S. Open Cup
- 2011 in American soccer
- Charlotte Eagles
