= Madrasa (disambiguation) =

Madrasa is the Arabic word for a school or educational institution. Alternative transliterations include or Madraza, Madraseh and Madrese.

It may also refer to:

== Films ==
- Madrasa (2013 film), an Afghan film
- Madraza (2017 film), an Argentine film

== Places ==
- Madraseh, a village in Afghanistan
- Madrasa, a village in Azerbaijan

== Other uses ==
- Madrasa, a variety of grape

== See also ==
- Madras (disambiguation)
