= 2012 U.S. Open Cup final =

2012 final of the Lamar Hunt U.S. Open Cup

- Event: 2012 U.S. Open Cup
Sporting Kansas City	Seattle Sounders FC
MLS	MLS
1	1
- Sporting Kansas City won 3–2 on penalties
- Date: August 8, 2012
- Venue: Livestrong Sporting Park, Kansas City, Kansas, U.S.
- Man of the Match: Jimmy Nielsen
- Referee: Ricardo Salazar
- Attendance: 18,873
- Weather: Clear, 77 °F (25 °C)

The 2012 Lamar Hunt U.S. Open Cup final was played on August 8, 2012 at Livestrong Sporting Park, now known as Children's Mercy Park, in Kansas City, Kansas. The match was the culmination of the 2012 U.S. Open Cup, a tournament open to amateur and professional soccer teams affiliated with the United States Soccer Federation. This was the 99th edition of the oldest ongoing competition in American soccer. Sporting Kansas City won their second U.S. Open Cup title, their first since 2004, by defeating Seattle Sounders FC, 3–2 in a penalty shootout following a 1–1 draw through extra time.

The Seattle Sounders FC were in their fourth-consecutive U.S. Open Cup Final, a feat that had not been accomplished since 1937. Seattle won the cup in its previous three appearances and was attempting to win a fourth consecutive championship.

As Open Cup champions, Kansas City earned a $100,000 cash prize and a berth into the 2013–14 CONCACAF Champions League, marking the club's first Champions League-era appearance in the tournament, and their third overall appearance in a CONCACAF competition.

== Road to the final ==
The U.S. Open Cup is an annual American soccer competition open to all United States Soccer Federation affiliated teams, from amateur adult club teams to the professional clubs of Major League Soccer (MLS). The 2011 tournament was the 98th edition of the oldest soccer tournament in the United States.

In contrast to previous years, for the 2012 edition of the tournament, all US-based MLS teams qualified automatically for the tournament. Previously, only 8 teams from MLS could qualify for the tournament, six automatically based on the previous year's league results, and two more via a play-in tournament. Both Seattle Sounders FC and Sporting Kansas City were automatically entered in the tournament for 2012.

=== Seattle Sounders FC ===
Seattle Sounders FC won the 2009, 2010, and 2011 U.S. Open Cup championships becoming the first team since 1968 to win three championships consecutively. As they had done in previous years, Sounders FC played 2012 U.S. Open Cup home games at the Starfire Sports Complex in Tukwila, Washington. The facility is smaller than the club's home stadium for league matches, CenturyLink Field, but Sounders FC representatives preferred the atmosphere at Starfire for smaller cup matches.

Sounders FC began their title defense against the Atlanta Silverbacks in the third round of the tournament. Atlanta's bid won the coin flip to host the match, but Seattle was allowed to buy the rights from them and the game was played at Starfire on May 30, 2012. Sounders FC striker Sammy Ochoa scored two goals with midfielders Andy Rose, Osvaldo Alonso and Alex Caskey each contributing a goal as Seattle routed the Silverbacks 5–1. Atlanta's goal was provided by Reinaldo Navia.

In the fourth round, Seattle faced amateur side Cal FC, coached by former U.S. national team star Eric Wynalda. Cal FC had qualified for the tournament through the USASA regional qualification process. In the tournament they upset several teams, including the Portland Timbers of MLS–shutting them out 1-0–prior to facing Sounders FC. The fourth round match was played on June 5, 2012 at Starfire in front of a crowd of 3,894. Because of the uniqueness of an amateur team making it so deep in the tournament and then facing the 3-time defending champion Seattle, the match was televised nationally on Fox Soccer. Cal FC kept the game close during the first half keeping the score 0–0 at halftime. However, Seattle would not be denied in the second half finally taking the lead in the 50th minute on a penalty kick by Osvaldo Alonso. Sounders FC went on to score 4 more goals with forward Fredy Montero scoring two, Andy Rose with one, and Osvaldo Alonso with his second of the game. The match ended with a final score of 5–0.

Just the chance isn't good enough for us .... We want this one, so let's make history.

— Brad Evans, Sounders FC midfielder

In the quarterfinals, Sounders FC went on the road to face MLS side San Jose Earthquakes at Kezar Stadium in San Francisco, California on June 26, 2012. Seattle had to play the Tuesday night match on one day's rest after losing a league match to the Portland Timbers on the prior Sunday. Seattle's Cordell Cato scored the only goal of the match which was very physical having five yellow cards issued (three to Seattle, two to San Jose) and one red card (to San Jose's Alan Gordon late in the match). The match ended with a bench clearing brawl between both teams. The final score was 1–0.

In their semifinal match, Seattle hosted Chivas USA of the MLS at Starfire on July 11, 2012 in front of 4,500 spectators. Sounders FC forward Eddie Johnson scored the only goal of the first half off of a well placed pass through the Chivas back line. Shortly after the second half kicked off, Seattle forward Fredy Montero was pulled down in the box and a penalty was awarded. Osvaldo Alonso took the penalty kick and scored by chipping the ball over the diving goal keeper. Chivas brought the difference back to one goal in the 74th minute when forward Cesar Romero scored. However, Seattle sealed the win with two more goals by Brad Evans and Sammy Ochoa. The final score of 4–1 ensured that Sounders FC would return to the U.S. Open cup final for the fourth straight year.

=== Sporting Kansas City ===
Sporting Kansas City previously had won the U.S. Open Cup in 2004, when the side was known as Kansas City Wizards. The Wizards won in sudden death overtime against the Chicago Fire, 1–0, to claim their first U.S. Open Cup title. Since winning the 2004 Open Cup, Kansas City has 2 other appearances in a cup final of a major tournament. The MLS Cup 2000 where they won 1-0 over the Chicago Fire and MLS Cup 2004, when they lost 3–2 to D.C. United.

Like Seattle and all fellow MLS sides, Kansas City began their Open Cup campaign on May 29, 2012 playing in the third round proper. Sporting hosted Orlando City of the third-division USL Pro. The match was deadlocked through the first half of play, before Sporting's Paulo Nagamura netted a goal in the second minute of stoppage time, giving Kansas City a 1–0 margin over Orlando. Ten minutes into the second half Trinidadian international, Kevin Molino, gave Orlando City the equalizing goal. It would be roughly 10 minutes later before Sporting's Soony Saad gave Sporting a 2–1 advantage in the 65th minute. Four minutes later, Saad would score again, giving Kansas City a 3–1 lead over Orlando. Orlando City's Dennis Chin would score a consolation goal in the 84th minute, but Kansas City would hold on to win the match 3–2.

One week later, Sporting Kansas City would play host to fellow MLS side, Colorado Rapids for the fourth round fixture of the Open Cup. Played in front of an announced crowd of 14,868, the June 5 affair saw Kansas City come away as 2–0 victors over the Rapids. The first goal for Sporting came in the 27th minute off of an own goal from Colorado goalkeeper, Matt Pickens. Late in the second half, a 79th-minute strike from Sporting's Teal Bunbury gave Kansas City the insurance goal to secure themselves a berth into the quarterfinals of the competition.

== Pre-match ==
=== Venue selection ===
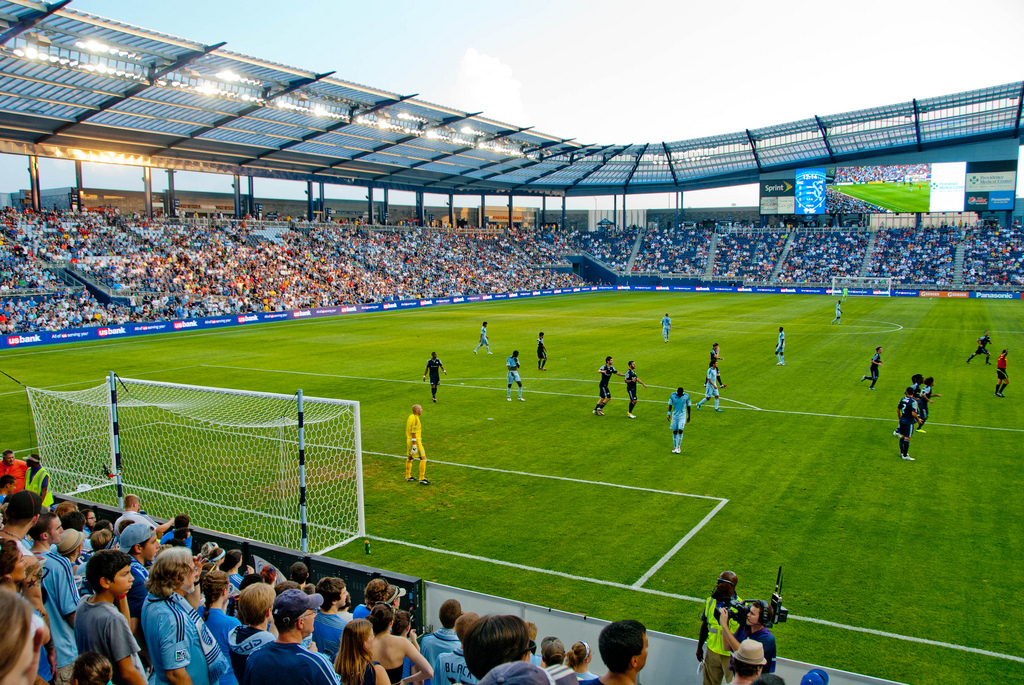
Livestrong Sporting Park in Kansas City was the host venue of the 2012 final, after the previous two finals were held in Seattle at CenturyLink Field.

With the rule changes for 2012, through the semifinal round of the tournament the home team was determined by coin flip if both teams had facilities available that met tournament standards. However, hosting rights for the semifinal and final rounds of the tournament were determined through a blind bid process. Prior to the semifinals, it was announced that if Kansas City and Seattle both won their semifinals (which they did), that Kansas City would host the final at Livestrong Sporting Park. It was later reported that the Kansas City and Seattle bids to host the final had been "identical" and that a coin flip had been used to determine hosting rights. Seattle's CenturyLink Field had been used to host the 2010 and 2011 finals and had set the attendance record for the final at 36,615 in 2011. By comparison, Kansas City's Livestrong Sporting Park has a capacity of 18,467. It was reported on the day of the final, that the stadium had not yet sold out.

== Match ==
The match was televised live on GOL TV.

Seattle took the field in a 4-4-2 formation while Sporting KC was in a 4-5-1 formation.

Following a half-hour extra time period, the two sides went into a penalty shootout to decide the outcome of the championship. As the home team, Sporting Kansas City went first in the shootout.

=== Match details ===
August 8, 2012
20:00 CDT

Sporting Kansas City	1–1	Seattle Sounders FC
Kamara 84' (pen.)	Report	Scott 86'
Penalties
Kamara (penalty scored); Espinoza (penalty missed); Besler (penalty scored); Zusi (penalty missed); Nagamura (penalty scored)	3 – 2	(penalty scored) Evans; (penalty scored) Burch; (penalty missed) Alonso; (penalty missed) Tiffert; (penalty missed) Johnson

Livestrong Sporting Park
Kansas City, Kansas
Attendance: 18,873

Sporting Kansas City	Seattle Sounders

GK	1	Jimmy Nielsen (c)
DF	7	Chance Myers
DF	13	Lawrence Olum
DF	5	Matt Besler
DF	16	Seth Sinovic	(substituted off) 100'
MF	6	Paulo Nagamura
MF	55	Júlio César
MF	15	Roger Espinoza
MF	8	Graham Zusi
MF	23	Kei Kamara
FW	9	Teal Bunbury	(substituted off) 89'
Substitutes:
GK	18	Eric Kronberg
DF	2	Michael Harrington	(substituted on) 100'
FW	17	C. J. Sapong	(substituted on) 89'
FW	22	Soony Saad
DF	25	Neven Marković
MF	37	Jacob Peterson
MF	88	Michael Thomas
Manager:
Peter Vermes

GK	1	Michael Gspurning
DF	20	Zach Scott	(yellow card) 93'
DF	34	Jhon Kennedy Hurtado
DF	4	Patrick Ianni	(yellow card) 73' (yellow-red card) 118'
DF	12	Leonardo González
MF	10	Mauro Rosales (c)	(yellow card) 57'
MF	6	Osvaldo Alonso	(yellow card) 4'
MF	25	Andy Rose		(substituted off) 69'
MF	27	Alex Caskey		(substituted off) 69'
FW	17	Fredy Montero		(substituted off) 106'
FW	7	Eddie Johnson
Substitutes:
GK	33	Andrew Weber
MF	3	Brad Evans		(substituted on) 69'
DF	8	Marc Burch		(substituted on) 106'
MF	11	Steve Zakuani
MF	13	Christian Tiffert		(substituted on) 69'
FW	26	Sammy Ochoa
DF	31	Jeff Parke
Manager:
Sigi Schmid

Man of the Match:
Matt Besler (Sporting Kansas City)

Referee:
Ricardo Salazar
Assistant referees:
Corey Rockwell
Peter Manikowski
Fourth official:
Michael Kennedy
