= 2012 USASA Region IV National Cup =

Tournament details
- Country: United States
- Teams: 8

Final positions
- Champions: PSA Elite
- Runner-up: Cal FC

Tournament statistics
- Matches played: 10
- Goals scored: 52 (5.2 per match)

The 2012 USASA Region IV National Cup was a qualifying tournament that determined which clubs from the fourth region of the United States Adult Soccer Association qualified for the first round proper of the 2012 U.S. Open Cup. The Region IV National Cup's group stage matches took place on 4–5 May 2012 with the championship match on 6 May 2012. The regional tournament was held at Ontario Soccer Park in Ontario, CA.

The winners of each group joined the 64-team field of the 2012 U.S. Open Cup. The winner of the championship match also advanced to the USASA National Cup final four in Chicago in mid-July.

Though Texas is officially in USASA Region III, El Paso–based EP Elite were given special permission to attempt to qualify through Region IV representing neighboring New Mexico, but then failed to show up to the tournament and forfeited all their matches.

== Group stage ==
=== Group A ===
Team	Pld	W	D	L	GF	GA	GD	Pts
(California) Cal FC	3	3	0	0	14	3	11	9
(California) Doxa Italia	3	2	0	1	14	4	10	6
(California) Internationalist	3	1	0	2	3	15	-12	3
(New Mexico) EP Elite	x	x	x	x	0	9	-9	0

- EP Elite forfeited all matches resulting in 3-0 wins for the remaining teams.
4 May 2012
1:00 p.m.

(New Mexico) EP Elite	0-3	(California) Internationalist

Ontario Soccer Park

4 May 2012
1:00 p.m.

(California) Doxa Italia	3-4	(California) Cal FC

Ontario Soccer Park

5 May 2012
8:00 a.m.

(California) Internationalist	0-8	(California) Doxa Italia

Ontario Soccer Park

5 May 2012
8:00 a.m.

(California) Cal FC	3-0	(New Mexico) EP Elite

Ontario Soccer Park

5 May 2012
3:00 p.m.

(California) Internationalist	0-7	(California) Cal FC

Ontario Soccer Park

5 May 2012
3:00 p.m.

(California) Doxa Italia	3-0	(New Mexico) EP Elite

Ontario Soccer Park

=== Group B ===
Team	Pld	W	D	L	GF	GA	GD	Pts
(California) PSA Elite	3	2	1	0	9	0	+9	7
(California) DV8 Defenders	3	2	0	1	6	5	+1	6
(California) OC Crew	3	1	1	1	3	3	+0	4
(California) Pittsburg Galaxy	3	0	0	3	3	13	-10	0

4 May 2012
3:00 p.m.

(California) OC Crew	3–4	(California) Pittsburg Galaxy

Ontario Soccer Park

4 May 2012
3:00 p.m.

(California) PSA Elite	3–0	(California) DV8 Defenders

Ontario Soccer Park

5 May 2012
10:00 a.m.

(California) Pittsburg Galaxy	0–6	(California) PSA Elite

Ontario Soccer Park

5 May 2012
10:00 a.m.

(California) DV8 Defenders	2–0	(California) OC Crew

Ontario Soccer Park

5 May 2012
5:00 p.m.

(California) OC Crew	0–0	(California) PSA Elite

Ontario Soccer Park

5 May 2012
5:00 p.m.

(California) DV8 Defenders	4–2	(California) Pittsburg Galaxy

Ontario Soccer Park

== Advancing to Open Cup ==
- (California) PSA Elite
- (California) Cal FC

== Final ==
Cal FC will represent Region IV in the 2012 USASA National Cup.

6 May 2012
9:00 a.m.

PSA Elite	2–0	Cal FC

Ontario Soccer Park

== See also ==
- 2012 U.S. Open Cup
- 2012 U.S. Open Cup qualification
- United States Adult Soccer Association
