= Madrasi (disambiguation) =

Madrasi is an outdated exonym often used as an ethnic slur against the people of South India.

Madrasi may also refer to:

- Madrasi (2006 film), Indian Tamil-language film
- Madrasi chess, a chess variant invented in 1979
- Madrasi Highflyer, breed of pigeon from India
- Madrasi Para, neighborhood of Karachi, Pakistan
- Madirasi (2012 film), Indian Malayalam-language film
- Madharaasi, Indian Tamil-language film

== See also ==
- Madras (disambiguation)
