= Owen Morrison =

Northern Irish footballer (born 1981)

Personal information
- Full name: John Owen Morrison
- Date of birth: 8 December 1981 (age 44)
- Place of birth: Derry, Northern Ireland
- Height: 1.73 m (5 ft 8 in)
- Position: Winger

Senior career*
Years	Team	Apps	(Gls)
1997–1998	Derry City	3	(0)
1998–2003	Sheffield Wednesday	55	(8)
2002	→ Hull City (loan)	2	(0)
2003	Sheffield United	8	(0)
2003–2004	Stockport County	23	(1)
2004–2006	Bradford City	36	(2)
2006–2008	Dunfermline Athletic	34	(2)
2008	Derry City	16	(4)
2009	Sligo Rovers	25	(1)
2010	Portadown	11	(0)
2011	New York	13	(1)
2011–2012	Derry City	18	(0)
2014–2015	Letterkenny Rovers		

International career
- Northern Ireland U-21
- * Club domestic league appearances and goals

John Owen Morrison (born 8 December 1981) is a Northern Irish former professional footballer.

Morrison played in the League of Ireland for Sligo Rovers and had three separate seasons for his hometown club Derry City. He also played for English sides Sheffield Wednesday, Hull City, Sheffield United, Stockport County and Bradford City, as well as Dunfermline Athletic in Scotland.

== Career ==
After playing as a youth with Derry City in the League of Ireland, he began his senior career with Sheffield Wednesday during which he had a loan spell with Hull City. After 55 league appearances and eight goals in just under five seasons with the club he joined their rivals Sheffield United in 2003. He departed Sheffield United just five months later after refusing to sign a new contract after playing only eight league matches and joined Stockport County.

He left Stockport after just over a year and joined Bradford City after an initial loan period. However, Morrison fell out of manager Colin Todd's plans and made only 32 league appearances for the club before being sacked in May 2006 due to breaches of discipline. He did though endear himself to Bantams fans by scoring a last gasp winner against former club Sheffield Wednesday in a Yorkshire derby in February 2005 that kept the club in the play off hunt before ultimately falling short. Morrison joined Dunfermline Athletic in July 2006 after a successful trial and scored his first goal for the club in a 1–1 draw with Rangers in August 2006.

He has been capped by Northern Ireland at Under-21 level and was last called up to the senior team in 2001 but was not capped.

Morrison completed a week-long trial with Chinese side Qingdao Zhongneng in February 2007 and was offered a contract. The move was cancelled and Morrison was initially offered a new one-year extension but rejected this. Morrison signed a new contract extension with The Pars a month later.

After almost two years with the Pars, Morrison was returned to Derry City by manager Stephen Kenny, whom he played under while at Dunfermline. However, in September 2008, only a few months after his return to the Brandywell, Morrison was released from his contract by mutual consent.

In 2009, Owen Morrison was unveiled as one of two new players, the other being Stephen Parkhouse, joining Sligo Rovers upon the return of Paul Cook to the club. He scored his first goal for the Sligo in a 2–2 draw away to Drogheda United. He was released at the end of the season.

On 18 January 2010, Morrison signed for Portadown until the end of the IFA Premiership season.

Morrison signed with F.C. New York of the American USL Pro league on 18 March 2011, He scored his first goal for New York against Orlando City on 30 April 2011 to tie the game 1–1 but they eventually lost 2–1, on 28 June 2011, in the third round of the US Open Cup against the New York Red Bulls, he opened the scoring with a wonderful shot from a 30-yard strike that blasted into the top of the net to give FC New York the lead, but they lost 2–1.

Morrison left F.C. New York and rejoined Derry City for the remainder of the 2011 season. He was later released during the 2012 League of Ireland season.

On 23 February 2015 Morrison was charged with possessing a class A drug with intent to supply and possession of cocaine. He was also charged with handling a car stolen in the Republic of Ireland, with no insurance and no licence.

== See also ==
- 2007-08 Dunfermline Athletic F.C. season
- 2011 F.C. New York season
