= Quame Holder =

Trinidad and Tobago footballer

Personal information
- Full name: Quame Holder
- Date of birth: April 14, 1988 (age 38)
- Place of birth: Port of Spain, Trinidad and Tobago
- Height: 6 ft 1 in (1.85 m)
- Position: Midfielder

Youth career
- 2004–2008: New Rochelle Storm Raiders
- 2009–2010: New York Red Bulls

Senior career*
Years	Team	Apps	(Gls)
2010	New York Red Bull NPSL		
2011	F.C. New York	22	(2)
- * Club domestic league appearances and goals as of June 10, 2011

Quame Holder (born April 14, 1988, in Port of Spain) is a Trinidadian footballer who is currently without a club.

== Career ==
=== Amateur ===
Holder moved from his native Trinidad to the United States aged 13, settling in New York. He attended New Rochelle High School, and played for the nationally ranked youth club New Rochelle Storm Raiders, but decided against a college soccer career, signing instead with the youth academy of Major League Soccer's New York Red Bulls in 2009. He played with the New York Red Bull NPSL team in the National Premier Soccer League in 2010.

=== Professional ===
Holder signed his first professional contract in 2011 when he was signed by F.C. New York of the USL Professional Division. He made his professional debut on April 30, 2011, in a 2–1 loss to Orlando City, and scored his first professional goal on May 30 in a 2–1 win over the Rochester Rhinos.
