= Southern California Eagles =

- Full name: Southern California Eagles
- Nickname: SoCal Eagles
- Founded: 1983; 43 years ago
- Stadium: Al Barbour Field; La Mirada, California
- Capacity: 1,150
- General Manager: Mark Schrock
- Head Coach: Todd Elkins
- League: USL League Two; Women's Premier Soccer League
- 2025: 7th, Southwest Division (no playoffs)
- Website: thesocaleagles.com
Home colors	Away colors

Southern California Eagles are an American soccer team based in La Mirada, California. Founded in 2001 as the Southern California Seahorses, the team plays in USL League Two, the fourth tier of the American Soccer Pyramid. They also field a team in the Women's Premier Soccer League.

The team plays its home games in the stadium on the campus of Whittier College. The team's colors are navy blue, white and orange.

The Eagles are a division of Missionary Athletes International (MAI), an organization which undertakes sports ministry to share the message of Christianity through the environment of soccer. They are a sister organization of the Charlotte Eagles in USL League Two.

== History ==
The Seahorses, which had previously been in existence as a youth soccer club since 1983, joined the PDL in 2001, and were successful immediately, finishing second to Orange County Blue Star in their debut season with a 13–6–1 record. 2002 continued the trend, when the Seahorses again finished second in the Southwest Division, this time behind Chico Rooks, with an 11–7–0 record. Their first trip to the playoffs was also a successful one, when they beat Spokane Shadow and Cascade Surge to advance to the national final four, where they were defeated in the semi-finals by Boulder Rapids Reserve.

The Seahorses missed the playoffs in 2003, finishing third behind divisional champions Fresno Fuego, and just missed out again in 2004, finishing third behind Orange County Blue Star, despite posting some impressive victories in the regular season, including 4–1 defeat of Nevada Wonders and a 5–1 demolition of San Diego Gauchos.

The developing rivalry between the Seahorses and Orange County Blue Star continued in 2005, when yet again the men from La Mirada finished a close second to their all-conquering Southland neighbors in the Southwest Division standings. The Seahorses began the season with a five-game winning streak that included a 3–0 trouncing of California Gold; however, they did not manage to defeat – or even score a goal on – their rivals in their three games, losing 4–0, 3–0 and 3–0 to the eventual divisional champs. Nevertheless, the Seahorses were clearly the next best thing in the southwest, and enjoyed several impressive wins (including a trio of 3-0s over San Diego Gauchos, Nevada Wonders and Fresno Fuego) in the second half of the season. Their trip to the playoffs was a short one, however, as the Seahorses lost to Cascade Surge first time out. Striker Anthony Stovall registered an impressive 7 goals on the season, and Dylan Martinez led the team in assists.

2006 saw the Seahorses finally capture their first divisional title, besting Orange County Blue Star by seven points at season's end. The year was one of solid consistency, and included a hugely impressive 9-game winning streak which stretched from early June to the end of July, and included two 4–0 victories (over Los Angeles Storm and California Gold), and a hard-fought finale against the San Fernando Valley Quakes. However, for the second year in a row, the Seahorses' playoff excursion ended quickly with a 2–1 defeat to BYU Cougars. MLS-bound striker Josh Hansen scored an impressive 8 goals and 4 assists on the season, closely followed by Romanian import Cristian Rus with 6. Keeper Eric Reed enjoyed the best goalkeeping statistics in the PDL, with a goals-against average of 0.621 per game, and keeping 10 clean sheets in his 15 games.

However, much like their crosstown rivals Blue Star, everything went wrong for the Seahorses in 2007. With Eric Reed having gone to new USL-1 franchise California Victory, the Seahorses defence became incredibly leaky; the team suffered four defeats in their first five games – including a chaotic 4–3 loss to the San Fernando Valley Quakes – and although things began to sure up towards the second half of the season, they found themselves unable to actually WIN any games. Five ties in their last ten games put an end to their playoff hopes early, although the team did finish with a flourish with a resounding 4–0 thrashing of Bakersfield Brigade on the final day, and eventually finished 7th. Midfielder Conan Hawkins led the scoring stats, tallying 4 goals on the season, while Chris Leiva registered 6 assists.

The downturn in form continued in 2008 for the Seahorses, who began the season with a 3–1 loss to San Fernando Valley Quakes, and then won just one of their next eight games, a 1–0 road win over Lancaster Rattlers. To their credit, few of the Seahorses' losses were blowouts: 0–1 here, 1–2 there, but in each game their strikers never quite seemed to breach the opposition defenses, or show enough sharpness in front of goal. They enjoyed their revenge over Orange County Blue Star with a 1–0 win in June, making up for a 4–1 thrashing earlier in the season, and put an end to the San Jose Frogs' playoff chances with an impressive 3–1 home victory in mid-July, but finished the year with a 5–2 hammering at the hands of Fresno Fuego, and a disappointing bottom-of-the-table clash with Lancaster Rattlers on the final day of the season which ended in a 1–1 tie and managed to keep them out of the basement spot. The Seahorses ended their season in 9th place; Chris Leiva, Diego Mejía and Cristian Rus were the joint top scorers with three goals each, while Scott Lucky led the assist stats with 2 to his name.

The Seahorses entered their ninth season in the PDL looking to recapture the form of yesteryear, but it was not to be; despite welcoming ex-pros Josiah Snelgrove and Adam Frye back into the fold, and despite posting a 6–2 victory over Bakersfield Brigade in their second game of the season in which new signing Ryan Shaw netted twice, the Seahorses began to find that the story of their season would revolve around ties. The Seahorses drew eight of their sixteen regular-season games, and were made to rue their matches with Fresno Fuego and Ventura County Fusion in which they conceded a 90th-minute equalizing goals when they looked odds-on to win. Their last win of the season came at the beginning of July, a 2–1 away victory over the Lancaster Rattlers, and thereafter the men from La Mirada staggered to the finishing line, eventually finishing sixth in the division, eight points out of the playoffs, and missing the postseason for the third straight year. Ryan Shaw was the Seahorses' top scorer, with 6 goals.

On February 13, 2024, the team changed its name to the Southern California Eagles to match with other Missionary Athletes International soccer teams.

== Colors and badge ==
On March 1, 2018, the unveiled a new crest, as a part of a partnership with Charlotte Eagles.

== Players ==
=== Notable former players ===
This list of notable former players comprises players who went on to play professional soccer after playing for the team in the Premier Development League, or those who previously played professionally before joining the team.

- (United States) Mark Bloom
- (United States) Todd Elkins
- (Serbia) Tomislav Colić
- (England) Michael Cunningham
- (United States) Adam Frye
- (Puerto Rico) Josh Hansen
- (United States) Patrick Ianni
- (United States) Christopher Klotz
- (United States) Steven Lenhart
- (United States) Kiel McClung
- (El Salvador) Diego Mejía
- (United States) Ben Page
- (United States) Eric Reed
- (United States) Gregg Schroeder
- (Canada) Josiah Snelgrove
- (United States) Anthony Stovall
- (United States) Brent Whitfield

== Year-by-year ==
=== Men's team ===
Year	Division	League	Regular season	Playoffs	Open Cup
Southern California Seahorses
2001	4	USL PDL	2nd, Southwest	did not qualify	did not qualify
2002	4	USL PDL	2nd, Southwest	National Semifinals	did not qualify
2003	4	USL PDL	3rd, Southwest	did not qualify	did not qualify
2004	4	USL PDL	3rd, Southwest	did not qualify	did not qualify
2005	4	USL PDL	2nd, Southwest	Conference Semifinals	did not qualify
2006	4	USL PDL	1st, Southwest	Conference Semifinals	did not qualify
2007	4	USL PDL	7th, Southwest	did not qualify	did not qualify
2008	4	USL PDL	9th, Southwest	did not qualify	did not qualify
2009	4	USL PDL	6th, Southwest	did not qualify	did not qualify
2010	4	USL PDL	5th, Southwest	did not qualify	did not qualify
2011	4	USL PDL	4th, Southwest	did not qualify	did not qualify
2012	4	USL PDL	8th, Southwest	did not qualify	did not qualify
2013	4	USL PDL	7th, Southwest	did not qualify	did not qualify
2014	4	USL PDL	6th, Southwest	did not qualify	did not qualify
2015	4	USL PDL	4th, Southwest	did not qualify	did not qualify
2016	4	USL PDL	5th, Southwest	did not qualify	did not qualify
2017	4	USL PDL	6th, Southwest	did not qualify	did not qualify
2018	4	USL PDL	8th, Southwest	did not qualify	did not qualify
2019	4	USL League Two	3rd, Southwest	did not qualify	did not qualify
2020	4	USL League Two	Season cancelled due to COVID-19 pandemic		
2021	4	USL League Two	Did not play due to COVID-19 pandemic		
2022	4	USL League Two	3rd, Southwest	Conference Semifinals	did not qualify
2023	4	USL League Two	4th, Southwest	did not qualify	did not qualify
Southern California Eagles
2024	4	USL League Two	7th, Southwest	did not qualify	did not qualify
2025	4	USL League Two	7th, Southwest	did not qualify	did not qualify
2026	4	USL League Two	7th, Southwest	did not qualify	did not qualify

=== Women's team ===
Year	Division	League	Regular season	Playoffs
2024	4	WPSL	4th, Coastal	did not qualify
2025	4	WPSL	9th, So Cal	did not qualify

== Honors ==
- USL PDL Southwest Division Champions 2006
- USL PDL Western Conference Champions 2002

== Head coaches ==
- (United States) Todd Elkins (2005–2013)
- (United States) Johnny Juarez-Jackman (2013–2015)
- (United States) Joe Lurker (2015)
- (United States) Todd Elkins (2016-present)

== Stadia ==
- Stadium at La Habra High School; La Habra, California (2003–2004)
- Al Barbour Field; La Mirada, California (2004–present)

== Average attendance ==
- 2005: 300
- 2006: 279
- 2007: 263
- 2008: 328
- 2009: 277
- 2010: 233
- 2011: 150
- 2012: 223
- 2013: 200
- 2014: 198
- 2015: 176
