= Josh Tudela =

American soccer player (born 1984)

Personal information
- Full name: Joshua Tudela
- Date of birth: March 13, 1984 (age 42)
- Place of birth: Evansville, Indiana, United States
- Height: 5 ft 9 in (1.75 m)
- Position: Midfielder

Youth career
- Evansville Flame
- North Huskies
- 2002–2006: Indiana Hoosiers

Senior career*
Years	Team	Apps	(Gls)
2003	West Michigan Edge	4	(0)
2004–2005	Fort Wayne Fever	24	(8)
2006	Kalamazoo Kingdom	6	(3)
2007–2009	Los Angeles Galaxy	23	(0)
2007	→ California Victory (loan)	6	(0)
2009–2010	Doxa Italia	2	(0)
2011	Los Angeles Blues	19	(1)

Managerial career
- 2008–2010: Tudela Soccer Academy
- 2011–2012: Beach Futbol Club
- 2012–2014: VCU Rams (assistant coach)
- 2014–2019: Tudela Futbol Club
- * Club domestic league appearances and goals

Joshua Tudela (born March 13, 1984) is an American former professional soccer player and manager.

== Life and career ==
=== Early life and youth career ===
Tudela was born in Evansville, Indiana. He began his playing career with the Evansville Flame under the administration of his father Fernando and Pedro Millan. Tudela attended North High School played with on the North Huskies high school soccer team. He was named MVP, Best Offensive Player and Most Dedicated Player on his high school team as a junior and senior. Tudela led the Southern Indiana Athletic Conference in scoring as a senior, scoring 31 goals and 14 assists, and finished his high school career with 80 goals and 62 assists.

In 2003, Tudela made his college debut for the Indiana Hoosiers, appearing in 22 matches while making 15 starts. He was named to the College Cup All-Tournament team as Indiana won the 2003 NCAA Championship, and finished the season with one goal and five assists. In 2004, he played in and started all 24 games for Indiana as the Hoosiers won their second consecutive national championship. He was fourth on the team with five assists, three of which came on game-winning goals. He scored his only goal of the year in the NCAA Tournament Third Round victory over the Boston Eagles.

In 2005, he earned Second Team All-Big Ten honors after finishing the year with seven goals and five assists. He had his first career multi-goal game in a 2–0 win over the Louisville Cardinals and was joined on at IU by his brother Jacob who was a redshirt freshman in 2005. In 2006, he was named Big Ten Player of the Year and to the NSCAA All-American Third Team after scoring three goals and adding two assists in 22 games. He started all 22 of IU's contests and was one of the team's captains. He finished his career with 11 goals and 17 assists while helping the Hoosiers reach the second round of the NCAA Tournament all four years.

=== Professional career ===
During his college years, Tudela also played with West Michigan Edge, Fort Wayne Fever and Kalamazoo Kingdom in the Premier Development League.

Tudela was the Galaxy's second selection in the second round (20th overall) of the 2007 MLS SuperDraft. After initially not featuring for the club, Tudela would end the season appearing in nine matches, all starts during his rookie campaign. He spent three weeks on loan with the California Victory of the United Soccer League. In the 2008 preseason, Tudela scored his first goal in a Galaxy uniform during the Pan-Pacific Championship against Sydney FC in Hawaii. The regular season saw him compete in six games with three starts and an assist. After making eight starts in 2009, Tudela was waived by Los Angeles on July 1 to make roster space for Alecko Eskandarian.

After a brief stint with LA-based side Doxa Italia, Tudela traveled to Romania for a trial with former European champions Steaua Bucharest in January 2010. However, Steaua decided not to offer him a contract. On February 17, 2010, he started a trial with Polish team Cracovia but again was not offered a contract.

In December 2010, Tudela signed with the expansion Los Angeles Blues of USL Pro for the 2011 season.

=== Managerial career ===
Tudela was recruited, in 2011, as head coach of the Long Beach-based Beach FC in the Southern California Developmental Soccer League. In January 2012, Tudela was recruited as assistant coach of the VCU Rams of Virginia Commonwealth University in Richmond, Virginia. He worked at VCU for three seasons.

In 2014, Tudela returned to his hometown of Evansville to help found Tudela Futbol Club, a youth soccer club based in the Newburgh suburb of Evansville.

== Other ventures ==
In 2015, Tudela Family LLC purchased the historic Washington Hotel building in downtown Evansville at the intersection of Main and Third Street. They renovated and opened it as the restaurant Comfort by the Cross Eyed Cricket in 2017.

Tudela opened a doughnut shop in Bloomington, Indiana in 2022.

== Honors ==
Indiana University

- NCAA Men's Division I Soccer Championship: 2003, 2004
