= Christopher Klotz =

American soccer player

Personal information
- Full name: Christopher Klotz
- Date of birth: May 22, 1984 (age 42)
- Place of birth: Laguna Niguel, California, U.S.
- Height: 5 ft 10 in (1.78 m)
- Position: Midfielder

Youth career
- 2002–2005: UC Irvine Anteaters

Senior career*
Years	Team	Apps	(Gls)
2004–2005	Southern California Seahorses	20	(0)
2006–2010	Charlotte Eagles	50	(0)
- * Club domestic league appearances and goals as of August 15, 2010

Christopher Klotz (born May 22, 1984) is an American retired soccer player.

== Career ==
=== College ===
Klotz played club soccer for the Irvine Strikers and played four years of college soccer at the University of California, Irvine from 2002 to 2005, where he earned All Big West and Scholar Athlete Honors. During his college years he also played in the USL Premier Development League with the Southern California Seahorses.

=== Professional ===
Undrafted out of college, Klotz signed with the Charlotte Eagles in the USL Second Division in 2006. He made his professional debut on May 20, 2006, in a game against Wilmington Hammerheads. Klotz remained a player for Charlotte through the 2010 season. During his playing career, Klotz was also an assistant director for the Charlotte Eagles camp program, Learn from the Pros, where he helped with the program curriculum and staff training. After retiring as an active player, Klotz stayed with Charlotte as part of its youth development team.
