= Madras (disambiguation) =

Madras is the former name of Chennai, the capital of Tamil Nadu state in India.

Madras may also refer to:

== Food ==
- Madras (beverage), an alcoholic beverage
- Madras bean, a legume native to South Asia
- Madras curry, a curry sauce in Anglo-Indian cuisine

== Places ==
- Madras Presidency, a former province of British India
- Madras State, a state of India until 1968
- Madras, Georgia, a community in the United States
- Madras, Oregon, a city in the United States
- Kampung Madras, a neighborhood in Medan, Indonesia

== Other ==
- Madras (cloth), a type of cotton fabric originating in the state of Tamil Nadu in India
- Madras (costume), the national dress of Saint Lucia, Dominica and the French West Indies
- Madras (film), a 2014 Tamil film
- Madras (soundtrack), to the 2014 film
- Madraskaaran, 2025 Tamil film
- Madras Bashai, a dialect of Tamil spoken in Madras
- Madras College, a secondary school in St. Andrews, Scotland, United Kingdom
- Madras Regiment, a regiment of the Indian Army
- Madras system, an education method
- HMIS Madras (J237), a WWII ship of the Royal Indian Navy
- 45575 Madras, a British LMS Jubilee Class locomotive

== See also ==
- Madra (disambiguation)
- Madrasa (disambiguation)
- Madrasi (disambiguation)
