= Derk Droze =

American soccer player and coach

Personal information
- Full name: Derk Anthony Droze
- Date of birth: October 29, 1972 (age 54)
- Place of birth: Fairfax, Virginia, United States
- Height: 5 ft 10 in (1.78 m)
- Position: Forward

Youth career
- 1990–1993: George Washington University

Senior career*
Years	Team	Apps	(Gls)
1994	Iquique		
1995	Arica		
1996–1997	New Orleans Riverboat Gamblers		
1998–	Lyngby Boldklub		
2001–2002	Ølstykke	60	(21)
2002–2003	Helsingør		
2007	Hollywood United		
2008–	Doxa Italia		
- * Club domestic league appearances and goals

Derk Droze (born October 29, 1972) is an American former professional soccer player, who is currently coaching in Denmark for the Danish Club FC Nordsjælland. During his playing career, he played professionally in Chile, Denmark and the United States.

Droze, grew up in the Southern Maryland area, 30 miles outside Washington DC in the small town of La Plata, graduating from St. Mary's Ryken High School in 1990. In February 1996, the New England Revolution selected Droze in the fifteenth round (145th overall) of the 1996 MLS Inaugural Player Draft. In the fall of 2001, he moved to Ølstykke FC of the Danish First Division. He played sixty games, scoring twenty-one goals with Ølstykke. In 2002, he moved to Helsingør IF.

In June 2003, Droze was cast to be a part of the movie The Game of Their Lives.

DOXA finished as the second best men's amateur team in the US in 2011 losing in the Final on PK's to the Pancyprian Freedom from Eastern New York.
