= Troy Cole =

American soccer player (born 1986)

Personal information
- Full name: Troy Cole
- Date of birth: April 11, 1986 (age 40)
- Place of birth: Laguna Hills, California, United States
- Height: 6 ft 0 in (1.83 m)
- Position: Defender

College career
Years	Team	Apps	(Gls)
2005–2007	Irvine Valley Lasers		
2008	Mars Hill Lions		

Senior career*
Years	Team	Apps	(Gls)
2009	Atlanta Blackhawks	14	(0)
2010	AC St. Louis	28	(0)
2011	F.C. New York	23	(2)
2012	Wilmington Hammerheads	24	(0)
2013	VSI Tampa Bay FC	8	(0)
2014–2015	Wilmington Hammerheads	70	(1)

Managerial career
- 2009: Mars Hill Lions (assistant)
- * Club domestic league appearances and goals as of May 20, 2024

Troy Cole (born April 11, 1986, in Laguna Hills, California) is an American soccer player.

== Career ==
=== College ===
Cole attended Laguna Hills High School in Laguna Hills, California, and played two years of college soccer at Irvine Valley College, scoring three goals and three assists as a defender, before transferring to Mars Hill College after his junior year. He scored 7 goals in 35 games for Mars Hill, and was his team captain as a senior.

During his college years he also played with the Atlanta Blackhawks in the USL Premier Development League.

=== Professional ===
Cole signed his first professional contract in 2010 when he was signed by AC St. Louis of the USSF Division 2 Professional League. He made his professional debut starting at right back on April 10, 2010, in a game against the Carolina RailHawks.

After the demise of AC St. Louis, Cole signed with F.C. New York of the USL Pro league on March 15, 2011. He scored his first professional goal while playing for New York, in a 3–0 victory over the Dayton Dutch Lions on June 10, 2011.

=== Coaching career ===
Cole worked as an assistant coach for his alma mater, Mars Hill College, in 2009.
