= Artur Aghasyan =

Armenian footballer (born 1987)

Personal information
- Full name: Artur Aghasyan
- Date of birth: 24 June 1987 (age 39)
- Place of birth: Yerevan, Armenia
- Height: 5 ft 8 in (1.73 m)
- Position: Forward

Team information
- Current team: Ventura County Fusion
- Number: 12

Youth career
- 2003–2004: Banants

Senior career*
Years	Team	Apps	(Gls)
2005–2007	Pyunik	31	(19)
2007	→ Ulisses (loan)		
2008–2009	Ventura County Fusion	28	(11)
2009–2010	Doxa Italia	1	(1)
2011	Real Salt Lake	4	(0)
2011	Los Angeles Blues	5	(0)
2012	Cal FC		
2013	Ventura County Fusion	5	(0)

International career
2006	Armenia U19	4	(0)
- Armenia U21

Managerial career
- 2022–: SC Brave Lions
- * Club domestic league appearances and goals as of 18 August 2013

Artur Aghasyan (Armenian:Արթուր Աղասյան, born 24 June 1987 in Yerevan) is a retired Armenian professional footballer. He is the current manager of SC Brave Lions.

== Career ==
=== Armenia ===
Aghasyan played for the youth side Banants, with whom he won the Armenian U-16 and U-17 National Championships in 2003 and 2004, before signing his first professional contract with Pyunik in 2005. He was the top scorer in the Armenian First League in 2005, scoring 16 goals in 25 appearances. He went on to play three games for Pyunik in 2007, and spent time on loan at Ulisses, before leaving the club at the end of the season.

=== United States ===
Aghasyan moved to the United States in 2008 after his family received U.S. green cards. Settling in the Glendale, California area, Aghasyan signed to play with USL Premier Development League club Ventura County Fusion. He spent two seasons with Fusion, helping the team to the 2009 USL PDL championship.

Aghasyan attended professional trials with Major League Soccer sides Chivas USA and Real Salt Lake in 2010, scoring four goals in three exhibition contests for Chivas, and scoring a goal for RSL in a 6-0 exhibition win over Chinese side Shandong Luneng Taishan. After a brief stint with Los Angeles-based amateur side Doxa Italia he played for Chivas USA in the MLS Reserve Division in 2011, before signing a professional contract with Real Salt Lake on 27 May 2011. He made his MLS debut on 4 June as a late substitute in a 2–0 win over Vancouver Whitecaps FC. Aghasyan was released by Salt Lake on 29 July 2011. Shortly thereafter he signed with Los Angeles Blues of the USL Pro league.

Aghasyan was released from his contract with the Blues at the end of the season. Recently, he has been playing with the amateur side Cal FC in the USASA-affiliated La Gran Liga de Oxnard based in Oxnard, California.

=== International ===
Aghasyan is an Armenian youth international, having represented his country at U-19 and U-21 level. He played four games for the Armenia U-19 team at the European U-19 Championships in 2006.

== Personal ==
Aghasyan is a cousin of fellow Armenian professional soccer player Yura Movsisyan.
