= Anthony Stovall =

American soccer player

Anthony Stovall, II
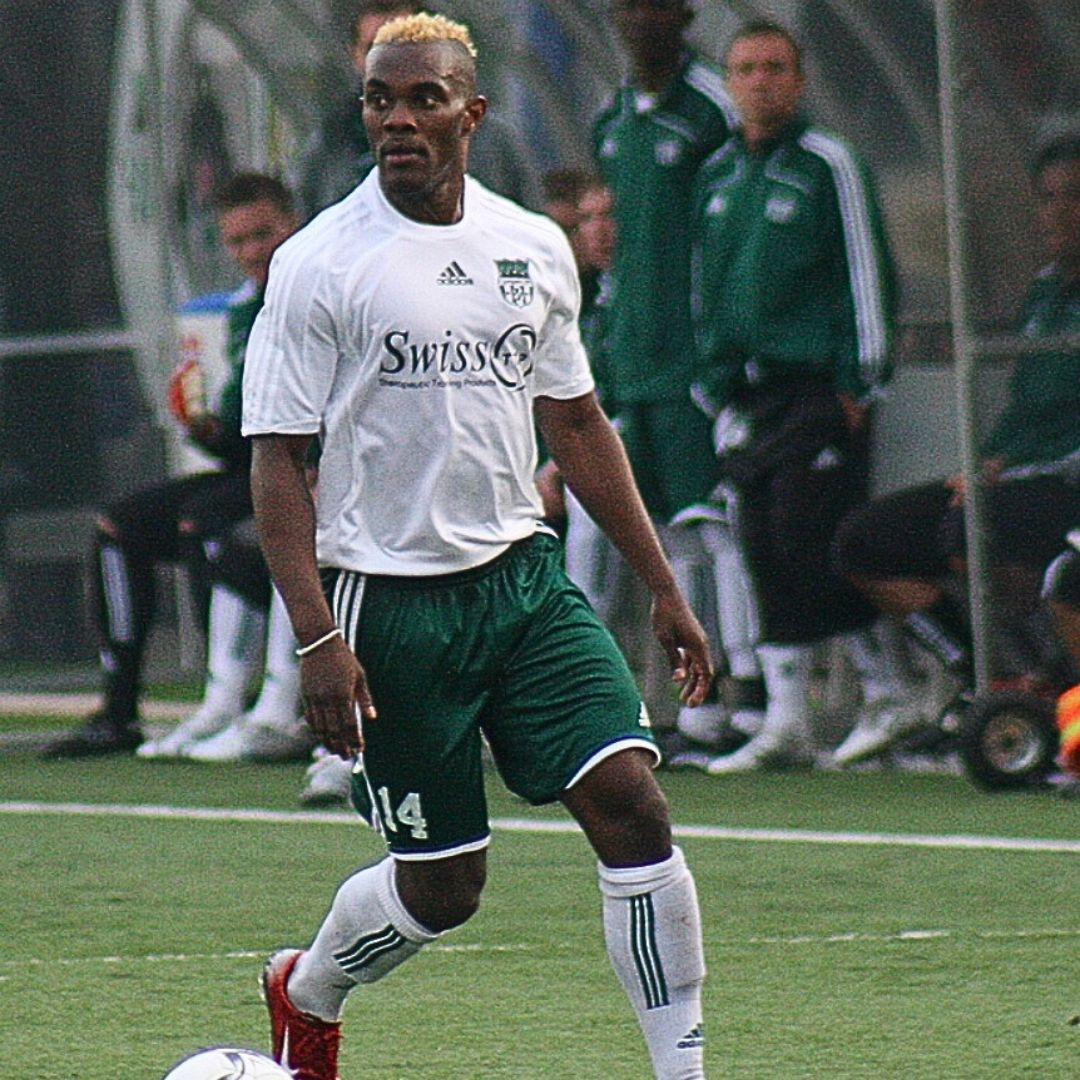

Personal information
- Full name: Anthony Maurice Stovall, II
- Date of birth: February 21, 1982 (age 44)
- Place of birth: New Orleans, Louisiana, United States
- Height: 5 ft 9 in (1.75 m)
- Position: Midfielder

College career
Years	Team	Apps	(Gls)
2001–2004	South Carolina Gamecocks		

Senior career*
Years	Team	Apps	(Gls)
2003	Greenville Lions	12	(7)
2004	Lafayette Swamp Cats	12	(4)
2005	Southern California Seahorses	16	(7)
2005	Chivas USA	6	(0)
2006	Charlotte Eagles	18	(0)
2008	A.F.C. Tubize		
2008	SG Sonnenhof Großaspach		
2007–2009	Cleveland City Stars	48	(0)
2011	Rochester Rhinos	3	(0)
- * Club domestic league appearances and goals as of 22 October 2009

Anthony Stovall (born February 21, 1982) is a former professional American soccer player.

== Career ==
=== College and amateur ===
Stovall grew up in Columbia, South Carolina, attended Ridge View High School, and played college soccer at the University of South Carolina.

During his college years he also played with both Greenville Lions and the Southern California Seahorses in the USL Premier Development League.

=== Professional ===
Stovall began his professional career in 2004 with the Charlotte Eagles of the USL Second Division. The following season, he was loaned to the Southern California Seahorses, where he delivered a standout campaign—ranking among the national leaders in goals and assists. His strong form and attacking impact drew the attention of Major League Soccer scouts, and after an impressive performance in a reserve match against Chivas USA, Stovall signed a professional contract with the MLS club later that year.

The following year he joined the Charlotte Eagles of the USL Championship making several appearances. 2007, he made the move to the Cleveland City Stars of the USL First Division in 2007. After two standout seasons with the Cleveland City Stars—culminating in the club’s 2008 USL Second Division championship—Stovall earned recognition for his technical quality, work rate, and leadership. His performances opened the door to Europe, where he trained and later signed with Belgian First Division club A.F.C. Tubize and German Regionalliga side SG Sonnenhof Großaspach. Following his European stint, Stovall returned to the United States for the 2009 USL season.

Missing the 2010 season to coach, he made a return to professional soccer the following season. April 12, 2011, Stovall signed a 21-day contract with Rochester Rhinos of the USL Pro league.

== Personal ==
Anthony is married to Jennifer Stovall and they currently reside in Southwest Florida. Stovall has 4 kids, Natalie ( 2010), Kingston (2014), Roman (2016), London (2017).
