= Madra (disambiguation) =

The Madra were an ancient people who lived in northwest Panjab in ancient India.

Madra may also refer to:

- Madra Kingdom, as described in the text of the Mahabharata
- Uttaramadra, a northern branch of the Madra Kingdom
- Madri, a princess of the Madra Kingdom, who was to become a wife of King Pandu
- Madra Mountains, a mountain range in the Aegean range of Turkey
- Madra (album), the 2024 debut album by the band NewDad
- Madra, the 1991 debut album by the band Miranda Sex Garden
- Mądra, a Polish feminine surname

== See also ==
- Madras (disambiguation)
