= Sam Craven =

English footballer

Personal information
- Full name: Samuel Craven
- Date of birth: 27 September 1988 (age 38)
- Place of birth: Nottingham, England
- Position: Defender

Youth career
- Notts County

College career
Years	Team	Apps	(Gls)
2007–2009	Lynn Fighting Knights	47	(3)
2010	Buffalo Bulls		

Senior career*
Years	Team	Apps	(Gls)
2010	Long Island Rough Riders	14	(1)
2011	FC New York	8	(0)
2012	Mansfield Town	0	(0)
2012	Boston United		
2012	Hednesford Town		
- * Club domestic league appearances and goals as of 30 May 2011

Sam Craven (born 27 September 1988) is an English former footballer who played as a defender. He played professionally for FC New York of the USL Professional Division.

== Career ==
=== College and amateur ===
Craven attended The Becket School in his native Nottingham, and was part of the youth setup at storied English football league club Notts County where he made several first team appearances as a 17-year-old, before moving to the United States in 2007 after being offered a college soccer scholarship at Lynn University. He played three seasons at Lynn, scoring three goals with seven assists in 47 games, was a two-time all-conference selection, and helped the Fighting Knights to two conference titles. He transferred to the University at Buffalo prior to his senior year in 2010.

During his college years he also played with the Long Island Rough Riders in the USL Premier Development League.

=== Professional ===
Craven signed his first professional contract in 2011 when he was signed by FC New York of the USL Professional Division. He made his professional debut on 9 April 2011 in New York's first-ever game, a 3–0 loss to Orlando City. On 31 January 2012, Craven signed for Conference National club Mansfield Town after a successful trial with the club.
