= Brent Brockman =

American soccer player

Personal information
- Full name: Brent Brockman
- Date of birth: March 5, 1988 (age 38)
- Place of birth: Mechanicsburg, Pennsylvania, U.S.
- Height: 5 ft 10 in (1.78 m)
- Positions: Right back; winger

Youth career
- 2006–2008: Saint Francis Red Flash
- 2009–2010: George Mason Patriots

Senior career*
Years	Team	Apps	(Gls)
2009	Indiana Invaders	15	(2)
2010	Aegean Hawks	11	(3)
2011	F.C. New York	11	(0)

Managerial career
- 2011–2015: Red Land High School
- 2015-Current: Keystone FC
- 2015-2019: Mechanicsburg High School
- * Club domestic league appearances and goals as of May 14, 2012

Brent Brockman (born March 5, 1988) is an American professional soccer player who last played for F.C. New York.

== Early life ==
Brockman was born on March 5, 1988, in Mechanicsburg, Pennsylvania.

== Career ==
=== College ===
Brockman attended Northern York High School, where he was the 2 time Mid Penn Colonial Conference Player of the Year, First team Patriot News Big 11, All-State Place Kicker and played club soccer for Super Nova FC 87 where he won 2 EPYSA State Championships, and played two years of college soccer at Saint Francis University. He transferred to George Mason University prior to his junior year where they reached an NCAA Division 1 #15 ranking, where he won the Gordon Bradley Award and was named to the Bowling Green All Tournament Team and named Brine/NEC Rookie of the Week for his performance at the New Mexico Classic. Brockman ended his collegiate career with 1 goal and 10 assists playing as an attacking right back.

During his college years he also played with the Indiana Invaders in the USL Premier Development League, and played for the Aegean Hawks during the summer of 2010 in their efforts to qualify for the Lamar Hunt US Open Cup.

=== Professional ===
Brockman went undrafted in the 2011 MLS SuperDraft, and subsequently signed his first professional contract in 2011 when he was signed by F.C. New York of the USL Professional Division. He made his professional debut on April 9, 2011, in New York's first-ever game, playing 90 minutes in a loss to Orlando City. Brockman sustained a season ending knee injury in the third match of the season, thus ending his career. This was his 4th ACL tear in his career.

Brockman is a USSF Nationally Licensed Coach. He is a former head coach of Mechanicsburg High School, Keystone FC, and the Harrisburg City Islanders Academy teams.
