= Hernan Aguilar =

Argentine film director, writer and producer

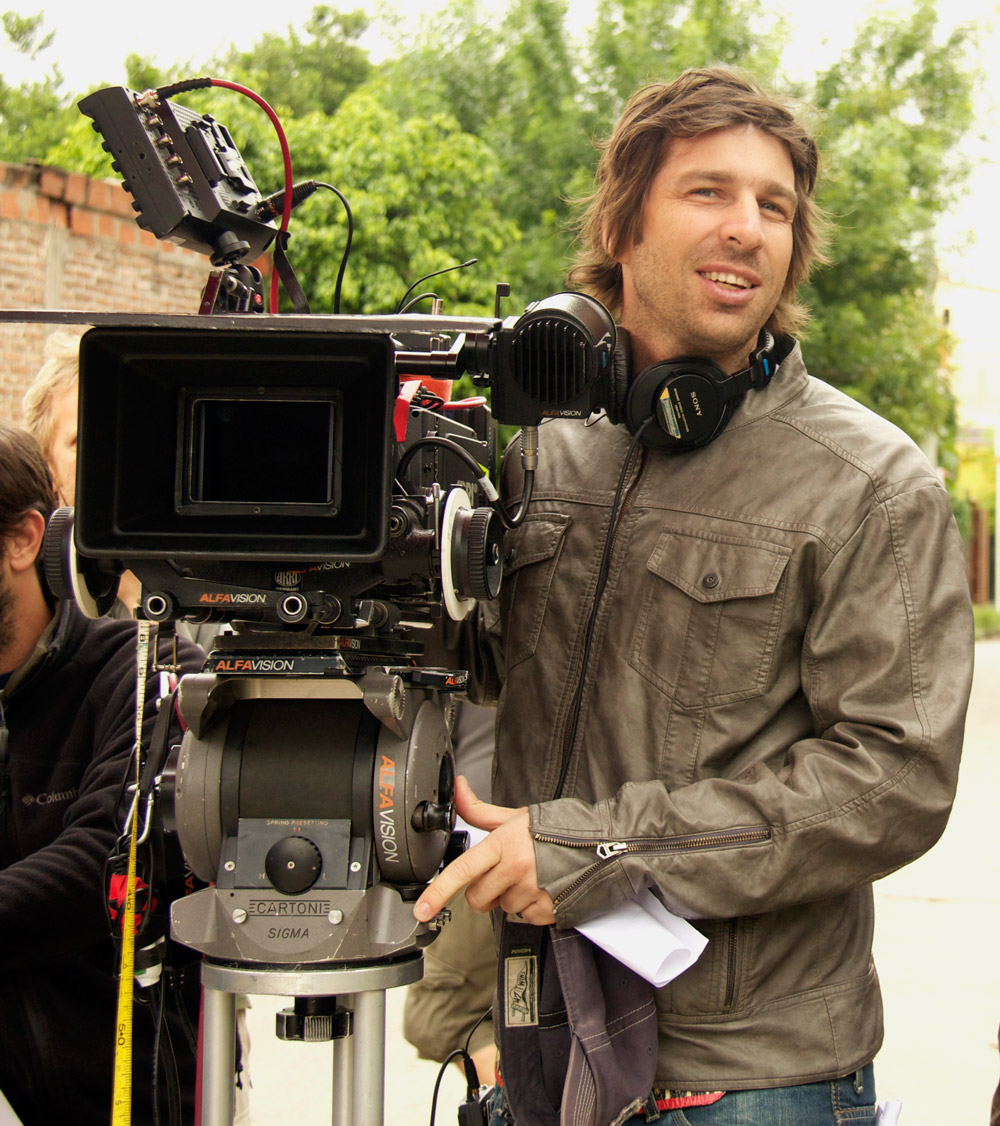
- Born: Buenos Aires, Argentina
- Occupations: Director, writer, producer

Hernan Aguilar is an Argentine film director, writer and producer. He is a prominent figure of cinema in his country, and known for directing Madraza (2017) aka "Godmother". Madraza won a Best Film Award at Sitges International Film Festival in 2017.

== Life and career ==
Aguilar was born in Buenos Aires, Argentina. He started studying Business Administration, at Di Tella University but dropped out after three years. His debut as director was in 1999, with the short Cachorros, a S16mm black and white film, starring a 9-year-old boy and a dog. Aguilar traveled to the United States and entered UCLA where he concentrated his studies on Cinematography and Screenwriting.

Aguilar wrote, directed and produced the film Madraza, an action black comedy about a housewife that becomes an assassin for money, which was picked up by the Walt Disney Company and distributed by Buena Vista International.

== Filmography ==
- Madraza (2017)

== Awards ==
Sitges Film Festival

| Year | Category | Nominated work | Result |
|---|---|---|---|
| 2017 | Best Feature Film, Blood Window Award | Madraza | Won |

Paraguay International Film Festival

| Year | Category | Nominated work | Result |
|---|---|---|---|
| 2017 | Best Feature Film, Golden Panambí Award | Madraza | Won |

Fantaspoa International Film Festival

| Year | Category | Nominated work | Result |
|---|---|---|---|
| 2018 | Best Screenplay | Madraza | Won |

=== Nominations ===
- 2006 Ariel Awards for Best Editing for 7 días
- 2018 Condor de Plata Awards for Best Feature Film Opera Prima
