= Michele Aquino =

Italian-born American soccer player

Personal information
- Full name: Michele Aquino
- Date of birth: September 11, 1989 (age 37)
- Place of birth: Naples, Italy
- Height: 6 ft 0 in (1.83 m)
- Position: Midfielder

Youth career
- 2007–2008: Stony Brook Seawolves
- 2009–2010: Adelphi Panthers

Senior career*
Years	Team	Apps	(Gls)
2007–2008	Long Island Academy		
2011	F.C. New York	8	(1)
- * Club domestic league appearances and goals as of May 14, 2012

Michele Aquino (born September 11, 1989, in Naples) is an Italian-born American soccer player who is currently without a club.

== Career ==
=== College and amateur ===
Aquino moved to the United States with his family as a small child, settling in Franklin Square, New York. He attended Carey High School, where he was named the All-County and Team MVP, and played club soccer for Auburndale Supersonics, Kosmos Supersonics and New York United Supersonics, with whom he won three State Cups. He began his college soccer career at Stony Brook University in 2007, transferring to Adelphi University prior to his junior season in 2009.

During his college years he also played with Long Island Academy in the National Premier Soccer League.

=== Professional ===
Aquino signed his first professional contract in 2011 when he was signed by F.C. New York of the USL Professional Division. He made his professional debut on May 28, 2011, in a 2–2 tie with the Richmond Kickers.
