= Madrasi Highflyer =

Breed of pigeon

The Madrasi Highflyer also known as Thavdal is a breed of performance pigeon developed over centuries for endurance flying. Thavdal, along with other breeds of domesticated pigeons are all descendants of the rock dove (Columba livia).

== Origin ==
They are native to and predominantly bred in the Indian states of Tamil Nadu, Andhra Pradesh and Kerala.

== Appearance ==
They have a streamlined body ideal for flying long hours. They usually have orange to reddish eyes.

== Performance ==
They are specifically bred to withstand the hot and humid conditions of southern India. They are usually flown during the monsoon months of June, July and August in tournaments. They are capable of flying up to 14 hours for several days during the competition. Some exceptional birds fly more than 20 hours.

== See also ==
- List of pigeon breeds
