= Stefan Lundberg =

American soccer player

Personal information
- Full name: Stefan Lundberg
- Date of birth: April 12, 1989 (age 37)
- Place of birth: Lower Burrell, Pennsylvania, United States
- Height: 5 ft 8 in (1.73 m)
- Position: Midfielder

Youth career
- 2007–2010: Duquesne Dukes

Senior career*
| Years | Team | Apps | (Gls) |
| 2011–2013 | Pittsburgh Riverhounds | 61 | (1) |
- * Club domestic league appearances and goals

Stefan Lundberg (born April 12, 1989) is an American former soccer player.

== Career ==
=== College and amateur ===
Lundberg attended Kiski Area High School where he was an NSCAA All-American, First Team Regional All-American, two-time All-State honoree, three-time All-WPIAL, and three-time All-Section selection during his three-year career there. Stefan was the Post-Gazette and Valley News Dispatch Player of the Year as well as Section Player of the Year. He broke school records in career goals and single season goals, still holding the single season record with 36 which led the whole WPIAL his senior year.

He went on to play four years of college soccer at Duquesne University, where he was named College Soccer News "Freshman to Keep and Eye On" and to the Atlantic 10 All-Rookie Team and the Atlantic 10 Pre-Season All-Rookie Team as a rookie in 2007, and to the Atlantic 10 All-Conference Second Team as a junior in 2008. As a senior, Lundberg was named to the Scholar All-America Team while nabbing First Team honors for both the All-Region and All-Conference teams, in addition to First Team Academic All-Region and All-Conference. He sits 6th in All-time career goals at Duquesne, as well as 7th in career points.

=== Professional ===
Lundberg turned professional in 2011 when he signed for the Pittsburgh Riverhounds of the USL Professional Division. He made his professional debut on May 21, 2011, in a game against F.C. New York, and scored his first professional goal on June 14 in a 3–2 win over Chattanooga FC in the Lamar Hunt US Open Cup.

He retired from professional football following the 2013 season to manage a fitness and training center at the Pittsburgh Mills mall alongside his brother Nick.
