= Ben Page =

American soccer player

Personal information
- Full name: Benjamin Page
- Date of birth: April 9, 1985 (age 41)
- Place of birth: Woodstock, Georgia, U.S.
- Height: 5 ft 9 in (1.75 m)
- Positions: Midfielder; forward

Youth career
- 2004–2007: Lipscomb Bisons

Senior career*
Years	Team	Apps	(Gls)
2007	Southern California Seahorses	10	(2)
2008–2013	Charlotte Eagles	52	(4)
- * Club domestic league appearances and goals as of December 12, 2014

Ben Page (born April 9, 1985) is an American former soccer player.

== Career ==
=== College ===
Page played college soccer at Lipscomb University, where he earned four consecutive All-Conference Honors in his four-year career, and was the Carolina Gamecock Tournament MVP.

During his college years Page also played with the Southern California Seahorses in the USL Premier Development League.

=== Professional ===
Undrafted by Major League Soccer out of college, Page signed with Charlotte Eagles in 2008 . He made his professional debut on August 1, 2008, in Charlotte's 2008 season opener against Pittsburgh Riverhounds. He made 10 appearances in total for the Eagles in 2008, helping the team to the USL Second Division regular season title.
