= Madraseh, Badakhshan =

Madraseh
- Location in Afghanistan
- Coordinates: 37°3′58″N 71°6′36″E
- Country: Afghanistan
- Province: Badakhshan Province
- District: Shuhada
- Time zone: + 4.30

Madraseh (Dari: مدرسه) is a village in Badakhshan Province in north-eastern Afghanistan.
