= Madraza (film) =

- Directed by: Hernan Aguilar
- Written by: Hernan Aguilar
- Produced by: Javier Entelman; Hernan Aguilar; Sebastian Aloi
- Starring: Loren Acuña; Gustavo Garzón; Sofía Gala; Chunchuna Villafañe; Osmar Nuñez; Monica Ayos; Ricardo Canaletti
- Cinematography: Marcelo Lavintman
- Edited by: Anabela Lattanzio Hernan Aguilar
- Music by: Guillermo Guareschi
- Production companies: Kozen Films S.A.; Aeroplano Cine
- Distributed by: Buena Vista International
- Release date: 25 May 2017
- Running time: 94 minutes
- Country: Argentina
- Language: Spanish

The Godmother (Spanish: Madraza) is a 2017 Argentine crime black comedy film directed, written, and produced by Hernan Aguilar. Madraza won the Best Feature Film Award in Sitges Film Festival 2017 Blood Window and won the Best Feature Film Award "Panambí de oro" at the Paraguay International Film Festival 2017.

Madraza is a genre film that, using suspense, action and comedy, wanders through the many difficulties that citizens of Buenos Aires must endure. The film's tone tends to satirize the current social perspective of Argentina and the limits of morale and insanity.

The film was released theatrically by Buena Vista International on 25 May 2017, something rare for an independent Argentine film.

== Plot ==
Using visually powerful action sequences and realistic performances, the film depicts the story of a simple housewife that becomes an assassin for money. A fiction feature film about a housewife living in the slums of Buenos Aires who becomes an assassin for hire to overcome the struggles of her emotional emptiness and tough economic situation. An intelligent and romantic detective investigates the murders. Stained of sexual tension, the relationship between the Detective and Matilde is both funny and refreshing.

== Cast ==
- Loren Acuña as Matilde, a housewife from the slums of Buenos Aires that becomes an assassin.
- Gustavo Garzón as Detective, a police investigator.
- Sofía Gala as Vanina, a friend and god-daughter of Matilde
- Chunchuna Villafañe as Teresita, a high class woman.
- Osmar Nuñez as El Comisario, the sheriff.
- Monica Ayos as Agustina
- Ricardo Canaletti as himself
