= Graciano Brito =

Cape Verdean footballer and coach

Personal information
- Full name: Graciano Brito
- Date of birth: June 2, 1985 (age 41)
- Place of birth: São Nicolau, Cape Verde
- Height: 6 ft 2 in (1.88 m)
- Position: Forward

College career
Years	Team	Apps	(Gls)
2005–2008	Quinnipiac Bobcats		

Senior career*
Years	Team	Apps	(Gls)
2010	Operário dos Açores		
2011	F.C. New York	12	(4)
2012	Rochester Rhinos	13	(2)
2013	Connecticut FC Azul	3	(2)

Managerial career
- 2012–2020: Quinnipiac Bobcats (assistant)
- 2020–: Siena Saints
- 2020–: Black Watch Premier (technical staff)
- * Club domestic league appearances and goals as of July 24, 2022

Graciano Brito (born June 2, 1985 in São Nicolau) is a Cape Verdean football coach and former professional player. Brito is currently the head coach for the men's soccer team at Siena College.

== Career ==
=== Youth and college ===
Brito came from his native Cape Verde to the United States in 2004, settling with relatives in Bridgeport, Connecticut, and played college soccer at Quinnipiac University. As a junior in 2007 he was named to the NSCAA/adidas All-America Second Team, was featured in Sports Illustrated's "Faces In The Crowd" section, was selected to the NSCAA/adidas North Atlantic Region First Team, and was named Northeast Conference Player of the Year, the first Quinnipiac men's soccer player to earn the award since 2001. As a senior in 2008 he was named the NEC Player of the Year for the second consecutive season, was Quinnipiac’s Male Athlete of the Year for the second year in a row, and was named to the All-NEC First Team, was an NCSAA/adidas All-American for the third consecutive year, and was a College Soccer News All-American. He finished his four-year career with Quinnipiac as the program’s Division I career leader in goals (40) and points (92).

=== Professional ===
Brito was an assistant coach at Quinnipiac in 2009, attended the 2009 MLS Combine, and briefly played professionally for Operário dos Açores in the Portuguese Second Division 2010, before becoming the first player to sign with the expansion FC New York of the new USL Professional League when he signed in February 2011. He scored the only goal of FCNY's first ever league victory, 1-0 over the Charleston Battery on May 13.

Brito signed with Rochester Rhinos of USL Pro on February 2, 2012.

== Coaching ==
Brito returned to his alma mater Quinnipiac University in 2012 to take a role as an assistant coach with the men's soccer team. Brito coached with the Bobcats for eight seasons before being appointed head coach at Siena College. Brito also joined the technical staff of Black Watch Premier Academy in 2020.
