= Karsten Smith =

American soccer player (born 1988)

Personal information
- Full name: Karsten Smith
- Date of birth: November 13, 1988 (age 37)
- Place of birth: Boston, Massachusetts United States
- Height: 6 ft 4 in (1.93 m)
- Position: Defender

Youth career
- 2006–2009: American Eagles

Senior career*
Years	Team	Apps	(Gls)
2011	F.C. New York	21	(0)
2012	San Antonio Scorpions	0	(0)
2013	VPS	26	(0)
2014	KA Akureyri	18	(0)
2015	Fort Lauderdale Strikers	11	(0)
2016	Pittsburgh Riverhounds	6	(0)
2016–2018	FC Edmonton	14	(0)
- * Club domestic league appearances and goals as of October 28, 2017

Karsten Smith (born November 13, 1988) is an American soccer player currently playing for FC Edmonton in the NASL.

== Career ==
=== College ===
Smith, born in Huntington Station, New York, later attended Walt Whitman High School, and played club soccer for BW Gottschee, leading team to State Cup titles at U-14 and U-15 level, before going on to play four years of college soccer at American University. He was named to the All-Patriot League Second Team as a sophomore in 2007, was selected to the All-Patriot League First Team as a junior in 2008, and earned All-Patriot League Second Team honors and served as a team captain during his junior and senior years in 2008 and 2009. He finished his college career with 6 goals and 1 assist in 66 games. During his summer seasons he starred with the DC United u-20's captaining the side with Drew Yates and playing alongside players such as, C.J. Sapong (MLS Rookie of the year in 2011).

=== Professional ===
After graduating college, Smith traveled abroad in search of a professional contract; he trialed with FC Lorient in France and SHB Đà Nẵng in Vietnam, but didn't sign with either team.

Smith signed his first professional contract in 2011 when he was signed by F.C. New York of the USL Professional Division. He made his professional debut on April 9, 2011, in New York's first-ever game, a 3–0 loss to Orlando City.

Smith signed with expansion side San Antonio Scorpions of the North American Soccer League on December 21, 2011. San Antonio finished the 2012 season as NASL Regular Season Champions, Losing in the playoff semifinals to Minnesota Stars SC.

In January 2013, Smith signed with VPS. Playing as the left sided centerback, Smith helped Vaasan Palloseura defeat HJK in Helsinki for the first time since the 1960s, a remarkable memory for the club. His key role for VPS throughout the 2013 season was essential for their 3rd-place finish and Europa League qualification. However, he suffered a hip injury in the last part of the season and due to a mutual decision Smith looked for other options.

In 2014, Immediately after recovering from injury Smith trialed with NY Cosmos and FH Harfnajordour. He eventually signed with KA Akureyri in the 1. Deild in Iceland.

After another successful European campaign Smith was considering several offers when the lure of playing for Ronaldo's Team in Fort Lauderdale was presented. Smith was a starter but unfortunately fractured his big toe on a hard tackle with teammate, P.C. in training. Smith was able to recover and provide some valuable minutes in the second half of the season, helping The Fort Lauderdale Strikers make a run towards the semifinals of the NASL.

On July 17, 2016, Smith signed with FC Edmonton. Later that day he made his first appearance for the Eddies when he came on as a substitute in the 62nd minute and helped the team to a 1–0 victory over the Ottawa Fury FC. FC Edmonton went on to lose in the NASL Semifinals in 2016. Smith was resigned by the Eddies and returned for the 2017 season. At the conclusion of the 2017 season, the NASL became defunct, FC Edmonton didn't have a league to play in and Smith moved on.

In February 2018, Smith was invited to Jacksonville and trained with the Armada. Unfortunately, the Armada didn't have a professional league to play in during the time and Smith decided to move back to New York and retire from the game.

Smith is currently a Youth Coach for New York City Football Club as well as an Account Executive for a B2B SaaS organization called SABX.
