= DV8 Defenders =

- Full name: DV8 Defenders Soccer Club
- Founded: 1999
- Ground: Bechet Field; Redwood City, California
- Capacity: ????
- Owner: (Colombia) Eduar Mafla
- Head Coach: (England) Tono Aspinall
- League: Peninsula Soccer League; USASA
Home colors	Away colors

DV8 Defenders is an American amateur soccer team based in Redwood City, California, United States. Founded in 1997, the team plays in Region IV of the United States Adult Soccer Association, a network of amateur leagues at the fifth tier of the American Soccer Pyramid.

The team plays its home games at Bechet Field in Red Morton Community Park. The team's colors are navy blue, black and white.

== History ==
DV8 were formed in 1999, and have competed in the Peninsula Soccer League (PSL), the top amateur league in the Bay Area in Northern California. Since joining the league the team won the PSL Cup Championship in 2004, enjoyed a perfect 2006-07 campaign on their way to their first Peninsula Soccer League championship, and have also won competitions such as the Soccer United League in 2010.

DV8 entered the Lamar Hunt U.S. Open Cup for the first time in 2011, and qualified for the tournament proper at the first attempt, topping their qualifying group that included Albuquerque Metro SC from New Mexico and local rivals SF Italian AC. DV8 is one of the most known teams in the bay area and is considered the most active high level soccer team in the area. DV8 also has former professional players active on roster and has had players on the roster that are now playing professionally.

== Players ==
Nor Cal League/Open cup 2014

Note: Flags indicate national team as defined under FIFA eligibility rules; some limited exceptions apply. Players may hold more than one non-FIFA nationality.

No.	Pos.	Nation	Player
—	GK	(United States) USA	Jorge Rosales
—	FW	(United States) USA	Philip Da Silva
—	FW	(United States) USA	Lee Mitchell
—	FW	(Mexico) MEX	Hunberto Alvarez
—	MF	(Mexico) MEX	Luis Fidel Medina
—	MF	(United States) USA	Cristobal Montes
—	MF	(United States) USA	Arturo Gomez
—	MF	(Mexico) MEX	Nestor Guerrero
—	MF	(Mexico) MEX	Jose Monje
—	MF	(United States) USA	Ryan Villapando
—	MF	(United States) USA	Javier Hill Ayala
—	FW	(United States) USA	Javier Tanton
—	DF	(United States) USA	Paul Moran

No.	Pos.	Nation	Player
—	GK	(United States) USA	Zack Wooster
—	DF	(United States) USA	Alex Plancarte
—	MF	(Bosnia and Herzegovina) BIH	Kemo Djedovic
—	MF	(United States) USA	Angel Pumayaco
—	DF	(United States) USA	Ryan Nevarez
—	DF	(Mexico) MEX	Oscar Iniguez
—	FW	(United States) USA	Taylor Amman
—	MF	(United States) USA	Anthony Salciccia
—	MF	(United States) USA	Christian Rosales
—	DF	(United States) USA	Victor Cortez
—	DF	(United States) USA	Justin Warren

== Notable players ==
- (United States) Javier Hill Ayala
- (Mexico) Hunberto Alvarez
- (United States) Luke Sassano
- (United States) Paul Moran
- (Brazil) Paulo Ferreira-Mendes
- (Brazil) Pedro Ferreira-Mendes
- (Scotland) Bryan Little

== Head coaches ==
- (England) Tono Aspinall (2010-2012)
- (United States) Jake Morrison 2012–present

== Stadia ==
- Port Royal Park; Foster City, California (2004–2008)
- Fiesta Meadows Park; San Mateo, California (2004–2005) 2 games
- Stadium at San Mateo High School; San Mateo, California (2005–2009) 8 games
- McGarvey Field; Redwood City, California (2008–present)
- Andrew Hill Park; San Jose, California (2008) 1 game
- Mayfield Soccer Complex; Palo Alto, California (2008) 1 game
- Bechet Field in Red Morton Community Park; Redwood City, California (2009–present)
