= Eric Reed (soccer) =

American soccer player

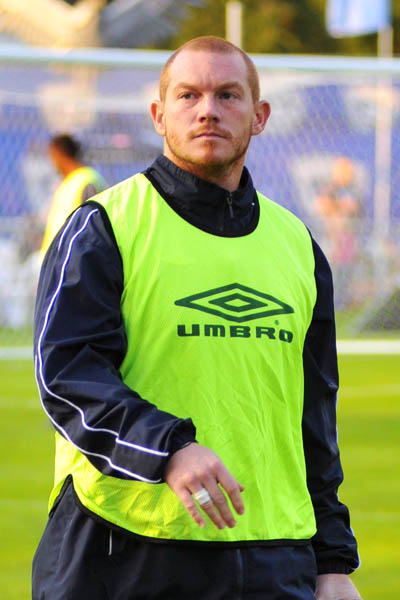

Personal information
- Full name: Eric David Reed
- Date of birth: December 7, 1983 (age 42)
- Place of birth: Nashua, New Hampshire, United States
- Height: 6 ft 0 in (1.83 m)
- Position: Goalkeeper

College career
Years	Team	Apps	(Gls)
2003–2006	UCLA Bruins		

Senior career*
Years	Team	Apps	(Gls)
2003–2006	Southern California Seahorses	48	(0)
2007	California Victory	25	(0)
2008	Cleveland City Stars	12	(0)
2009–2010	Carolina RailHawks	35	(0)
2011–2013	Charlotte Eagles	69	(0)
2011–2012	Syracuse Silver Knights (indoor)	16	(0)

Managerial career
- 2007: San Francisco Dons (goalkeepers)
- 2012–2013: Davidson Wildcats (goalkeepers)
- 2014–2017: Bowling Green Falcons (asst.)
- 2018: Malone Pioneers
- 2019–: UCLA Bruins (asst.)
- * Club domestic league appearances and goals as of May 12, 2020

Eric David Reed (born December 7, 1983) is an American soccer player.

== Career ==
=== College and amateur ===
Reed grew up in Laguna Hills, California, and attended Laguna Hills High School, where he was a four-year starter. During this time, he received a handful of United States U-18 caps. After high school, he attended UCLA where he redshirted his freshman year. The following year he appeared in four games and continued his good form earning an additional 16 games in his second year. He was a consistent first team starter over the next two years.

While attending college, he competed in the USL Premier Development League with the Southern California Seahorses. Reed was the 2006 PDL Goalkeeper of the Year, leading the league with a 0.62 goals against average as well as the top shutout total with 10.

=== Professional ===
After he was not selected in the 2007 MLS Superdraft, Reed was selected by the California Victory of the USL First Division in the 2007 USL First Division College Player Draft. At the end of the 2007 USL-1 season, California Victory fans voted Reed as team MVP.

Following the demise of the Victory, Reed transferred to USL Second Division outfit Cleveland City Stars, who he helped win the USL2 title in 2008. On February 9, 2008, Reed joined Carolina RailHawks for the 2009 season.

Reed signed with Charlotte Eagles of the USL Pro league on February 22, 2011.

Reed signed with Syracuse Silver Knights of the Major Indoor Soccer League for the 2011-12 indoor season on October 25, 2011.

== Coaching ==
Reed was briefly employed as the Men's Goalkeeping Coach at the University of San Francisco while playing for California Victory in 2007. He served as the Men's goalkeeper coach for Davidson College for two seasons in 2012–2013. He served as the Assistant Men's Soccer Coach of Bowling Green State University Men's Soccer Team from 2014 to 2017. This was followed by a Head Coaching role at Malone University in Canton, Ohio. He now currently works as the assistant men's soccer coach at UCLA.

== Personal ==
Eric is married with three children and currently lives in Cleveland, OH
