= Laguna Hills High School =

Location
- 25401 Paseo de Valencia; Laguna Hills, California 92653; United States

Information
- Type: Public
- Established: 1978
- Teaching staff: 64.05 (FTE)
- Enrollment: 1,401 (2023-2024)
- Student to teacher ratio: 21.87
- Colors: Brown and gold
- Mascot: Hawk
- Website: www.svusd.org/schools/high-schools/laguna-hills

Laguna Hills High School (LHHS) is a public high school located in Laguna Hills, California.

The school offers two two-way language immersion programs. This school competes in the Golden West League.

== Notable alumni ==
- Aloe Blacc, musician
- Bre Blair, actress
- Chad Carvin, former Olympic swimmer
- Tayyiba Haneef-Park, former Olympic volleyball player
- Eric Reed, former USL soccer player
- Shane Bieber, MLB pitcher
- Rob Refsnyder, MLB infielder/outfielder
- John Lamb, former MLB pitcher
