= Josiah Snelgrove =

Canadian soccer player (born 1986)

Personal information
- Full name: Josiah Snelgrove
- Date of birth: July 28, 1986 (age 40)
- Place of birth: Hartland, New Brunswick, Canada
- Height: 6 ft 0 in (1.83 m)
- Position: Defender

Team information
- Current team: FC Buffalo
- Number: 2

Youth career
- 2004–2007: Houghton Highlanders

Senior career*
Years	Team	Apps	(Gls)
2005	Ottawa Fury	12	(0)
2007	Southern California Seahorses	12	(2)
2008	Charlotte Eagles	1	(0)
2009	Southern California Seahorses	11	(2)
2010	Charlotte Eagles	0	(0)
2011	F.C. New York	7	(0)
2011–2012	Rochester Lancers (indoor)	9	(0)
2012-2014	FC Buffalo	9	(0)
- * Club domestic league appearances and goals as of February 25, 2012

Josiah Snelgrove (born July 28, 1986) is a Canadian soccer player who most recently played for FC Buffalo.

== Early life ==
Snelgrove was born in Hartland, New Brunswick.

== Career ==
=== Youth and college ===
He attended Houghton College, where he scored two goals and contributed 13 assists during his four years with Houghton, earning all-conference honors three times, and receiving a 2007 NAIA Men's Soccer All-America Teams honorable mention.

During his college years he also played for Ottawa Fury and the Southern California Seahorses in the USL Premier Development League.

=== Professional ===
Snelgrove turned professional in 2007 when he signed for USL Second Division side Charlotte Eagles. He made his professional debut on June 28, 2008 in a game against the Bermuda Hogges.

After spending the 2009 back with the Southern California Seahorses in the USL Premier Development League, Snelgrove returned to the Eagles for the 2010 USL Second Division campaign, but did not feature in any games due to persistent injury.

Snelgrove signed with F.C. New York of the USL Pro league on March 15, 2011.

On January 21, 2012, the NPSL side FC Buffalo announced the signing of Snelgrove. In the 2012 NPSL season, Snelgrove made eight appearances, with one red card and no goals. In the 2013 NPSL season, Snelgrove only registered one appearance.
