= Jhonny Arteaga =

Colombian footballer (born 1986)

Personal information
- Full name: Jhonny Alexandre Arteaga
- Date of birth: 24 November 1986 (age 39)
- Place of birth: Cali, Colombia
- Height: 5 ft 11 in (1.80 m)
- Position: Forward

Youth career
- 2004–2007: Dominican College Chargers

Senior career*
Years	Team	Apps	(Gls)
2007	Albany BWP Highlanders	12	(2)
2008	Western Mass Pioneers	9	(0)
2009–2010	Westchester Flames	3	(0)
2010–2011	ŁKS Łomża	14	(8)
2011	F.C. New York	21	(13)
2012	New York Red Bulls	5	(0)
2013–2014	Pittsburgh Riverhounds	17	(3)
- * Club domestic league appearances and goals

Jhonny Alexandre Arteaga (born 24 November 1986) is a Colombian former footballer and current football coach.

== Career ==
=== Youth and college ===
Arteaga grew up in Stamford, Connecticut, where he attended Westhill High School before playing college soccer at Dominican College (New York). In 2005, 2006 and 2007, Arteaga received All CACC Honors, and NSCAA All Region Honors in 2006 and 2007. During his Senior Year, Arteaga Led the CACC in Points (38) & in Goals (16). Following his Senior Year, Arteaga was Honored CACC Player of the Year, Daktronic's 1st Team All Region and 1st Team All American.

During his college years, Arteaga also played with the Albany BWP Highlanders in the USL Premier Development League.

=== Professional ===
Arteaga turned professional in 2008 playing with the Western Mass Pioneers in the USL Second Division, and made his professional debut on 19 April 2008 in the Pioneers' 3–0 opening day defeat to the Richmond Kickers. He left the club mid-season, and briefly played back in the PDL for Westchester Flames, before leaving for Europe to attempt to secure a professional contract.

Arteaga was trialed with Polish Ekstraklasa club Lechia Gdańsk in early 2010, before signing with Łomża. He played 14 games for Łomża in 2010 and scored 8 goals, before returning to the United States at the end of the season.

Arteaga signed with F.C. New York in the USL Professional Division in 2011. He scored his first goal for New York on 30 May 2011 in a 2–1 victory over Rochester Rhinos. He recorded his first professional hat trick on 15 June 2011 in a 3–0 victory over former club Western Mass Pioneers in New York's 2011 U.S. Open Cup debut. Arteaga ended the season playing in 21 league games for New York in 2011, and was the league's top scorer with 13 goals setting a single-season scoring record (16 in all competitions).

On 5 March 2012 it was announced that Arteaga had agreed to terms with New York Red Bulls of Major League Soccer. On 19 November 2012, the Red Bulls announced it declined options for an additional 6 players, having released 4 a week earlier, with Arteaga included in the mix.

On 22 February 2013, it was announced that Arteaga signed a 2-year contract with the Pittsburgh Riverhounds.

=== Coaching ===
On 5 July 2016 Arteaga was named assistant coach of the Iona Gaels Men's Soccer program which competes in the NCAA Division I.

Jhonny Arteaga is the Owner and Coaching Director of JA Elite Soccer Academy LLC which he founded in 2011. JA Elite Soccer Academy is a youth soccer training company based out of Stamford, CT.

== Honours ==
- USL Pro Golden Boot: 2011
- USL Pro Scoring Champion: 2011
- USL Pro All-League First Team: 2011
