= Manny Guzmán =

Mexican footballer (born 1986)

Personal information
- Full name: Emanuel Guzmán Pérez
- Date of birth: July 7, 1986 (age 40)
- Place of birth: Michoacán, Mexico
- Height: 1.77 m (5 ft 10 in)
- Position: Midfielder

College career
Years	Team	Apps	(Gls)
2005	Los Angeles Harbor Seahawks		
2006–2008	Cal State Bakersfield Roadrunners		

Senior career*
Years	Team	Apps	(Gls)
2007–2008	Bakersfield Brigade	20	(1)
2009–2010	Ventura County Fusion	21	(0)
2011–2012	Wilmington Hammerheads	43	(4)
2012	→ Charleston Battery (loan)	1	(0)
2013–2014	Ventura County Fusion	11	(0)
2014–2018	Venados	75	(1)
2019	Los Angeles Force	1	(0)
- * Club domestic league appearances and goals as of 21 November 2015

Emanuel "Manny" Guzmán (born July 7, 1986) is a Mexican former footballer.

== Career ==
=== College and amateur ===
Guzman grew up in Lakewood, California, and attended West High School in Torrance, California. He played one year of college soccer at Los Angeles Harbor College in 2005, scoring 10 goals and 11 assists, before transferring to California State University, Bakersfield in 2006.

During his college career and beyond, Guzman played with USL Premier Development League clubs Bakersfield Brigade, and Ventura County Fusion from 2009 through to 2010, and was part of the Fusion team which won the 2009 USL PDL national championship.

=== Professional ===
Guzman signed his first professional contract in March 2011, joining USL Pro club Wilmington Hammerheads. He made his professional debut on April 17, 2011, in Wilmington's first game of the 2011 season, a 1–0 win over the Rochester Rhinos.
