= Doxa Italia =

- Full name: Doxa Italia
- Founded: 1997
- Ground: Manhattan Village Park; Manhattan Beach, California
- Capacity: ????
- Owners: (United States) Derk Droze
- Head Coaches: (Republic of Ireland) Bryan Byrne
- League: Coast Soccer League; USASA
Home colors	Away colors

Doxa Italia is an American amateur soccer team based in Manhattan Beach, California, United States. Founded in 1997, the team plays in Region IV of the United States Adult Soccer Association, a network of amateur leagues at the fifth tier of the American Soccer Pyramid.

The team plays its home games at Manhattan Village Park. The team's colors are navy blue and white.

== History ==
Doxa were formed in 1997 by former professionals Constanin Balanos and Fernando Mastrocinque, and entered the Pacific League, one of several high-level amateur leagues in the Los Angeles area. They won their divisional title in their debut season, and since then have gone on to be one of Southern California's powerhouse amateur teams. Doxa have won five Pacific League titles (in 1997, 1999, 2000, 2001 and 2002), four Coast Soccer League championships (in 2004, 2005, 2008 and 2010), and four California Soccer Association South State Cups, as well as three Las Vegas Silver Mug championships and three Santa Barbara Fiesta Tournaments.

Doxa entered the Lamar Hunt U.S. Open Cup for the first time in 2009, and narrowly missed out on qualifying for the tournament proper at the first attempt, finishing second to National Premier Soccer League side Sonoma County Sol on goal difference. They missed out again in 2010, finishing third on goal difference again behind Sacramento Gold and the Arizona Sahuaros, but qualified for the first round of the tournament proper in 2011, after overwhelming their opponents in the USASA Region IV National Cup including an 18-0 win over Tracy CV Eagles FC in which Derk Droze scored seven goals, Ilia Nazarov scored five, and Bryan Byrne scored a hat trick.

== Players ==
=== 2013 USOC roster ===
Note: Flags indicate national team as defined under FIFA eligibility rules; some limited exceptions apply. Players may hold more than one non-FIFA nationality.

No.	Pos.	Nation	Player
1	GK	USA	Justin Commins
2	MF	USA	Eric Meister
3	DF	USA	Joe Cartlidge
4	DF	ENG	Craig Reynolds
5	MF	USA	Ryan Purtell
6	MF	USA	Steve Chirgwin
7	MF	IRL	Bryan Byrne
8	MF	USA	Ryan Taylor
9	FW	RUS	Ilia Nazarov
10	DF	CRO	Peter Hazdovac
11	MF	USA	Greg Piechota
12	MF	USA	Sean Lockhart
14	DF	USA	Ricky Figueroa
15	MF	USA	Derk Droze

No.	Pos.	Nation	Player
16	MF	GRE	Nas Koubourus
17	FW	USA	Matt Upton
18	GK	USA	Brandon Avery
19	FW	USA	Devin Skrade
20	FW	USA	Kyle Holland
22	MF	USA	Miguel Alvarez
22	MF	USA	Devin Toohey
23	MF	USA	Richie Million
24	FW	USA	Mike Piechota
25	DF	USA	Nissa Hatifie

=== Notable former players ===
- (Armenia) Artur Aghasyan
- (United States) Alex Bengard
- (United States) Brian Dunseth
- (United States) Josh Tudela

== Year-by-year ==
Year	Division	League	Regular season	Playoffs	Open Cup
2009	5	USASA			Did not qualify
2010	5	USASA			Did not qualify
2011	5	USASA			1st Round
2012	5	USASA			Did not qualify
2013	5	USASA			1st Round

== Head coaches ==
- (United States) Paul Rottenberg (2006-2007)
- (England) John Gerrard (2007–2011)
- (United States) Derk Droze (2011–2012)
- (Republic of Ireland) Bryan Byrne (2012–2013)

== Stadia ==
- Field at California State University, Dominguez Hills; Carson, California (2006-2008)
- Manhattan Village Park; Manhattan Beach, California (2008–present)
- Campus El Segundo Athletic Fields; El Segundo, California (2009) 1 game
