= Belson Stadium =

Stadium in Queens, New York, U.S.

Coordinates: 40.724307°N 73.792838°W

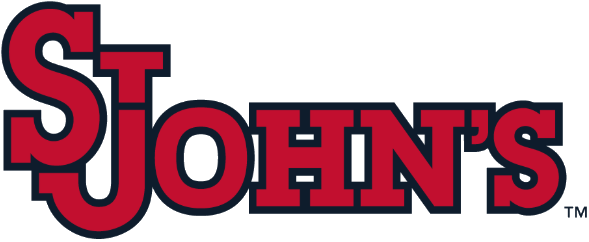

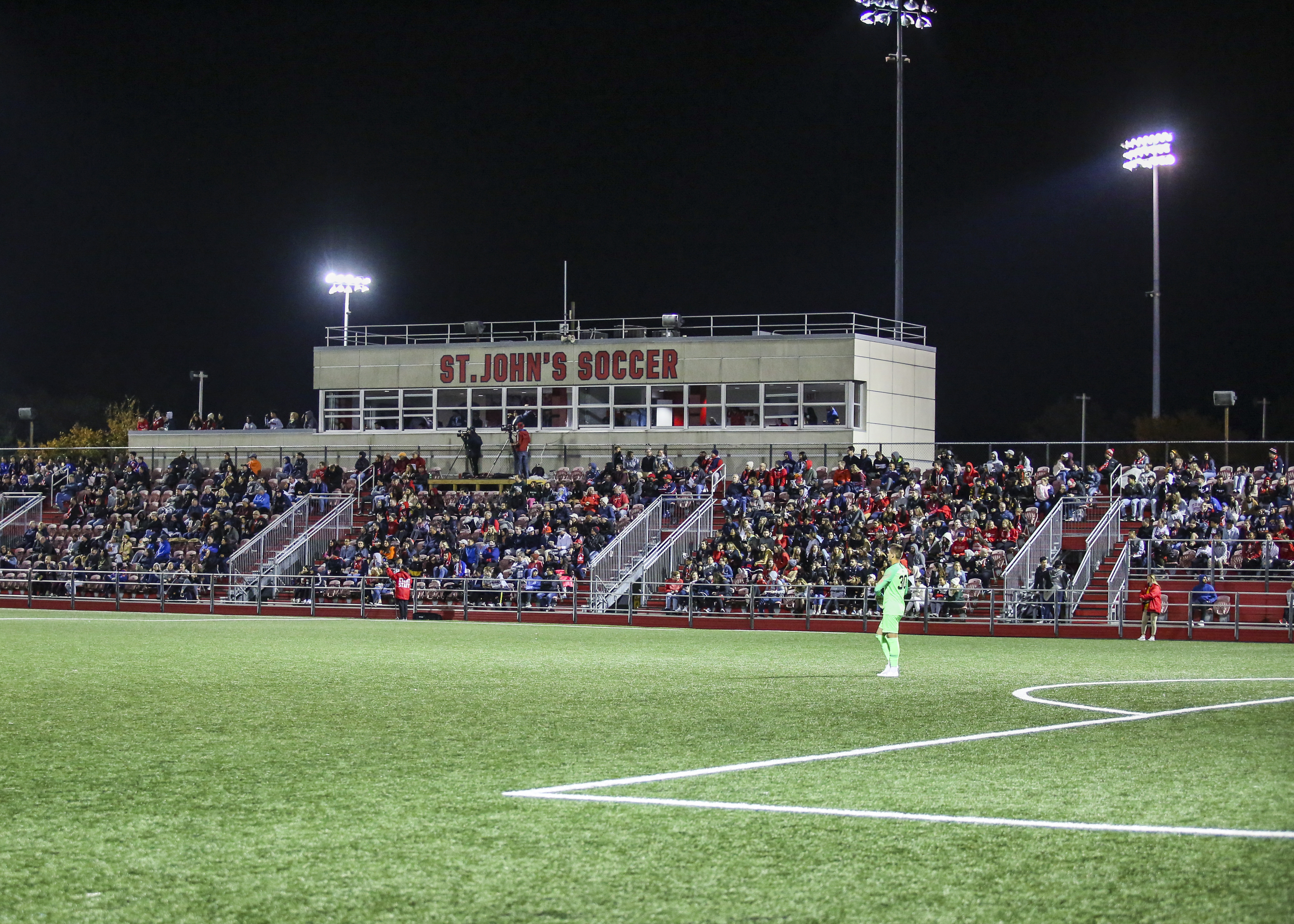
- The stadium in 2019
- Interactive map of Belson Stadium
- Address: 8000 Utopia Parkway; Queens, NY; United States
- Owner: St. John's University
- Operator: St. John's University
- Capacity: 2,168
- Type: Soccer-specific stadium
- Surface: FieldTurf

Construction
- Groundbreaking: February 1, 2001
- Opened: September 21, 2002; 23 years ago
- Cost: $6 million

Tenants
- St. John's Red Storm (NCAA) teams: men's and women's soccer (2002–present); Professional teams: New York Pancyprian-Freedoms (USASA) (2005–present); New York City FC II (MLSNP) (2022–present); F.C. New York (USL Pro/NPSL) (2011–2012); F.A. Euro (USL2) (2013–2018); New York Cosmos (NASL) (2015–2016); New York Rumble (MLU) (2015)

Website
- redstormsports.com/belson-stadium

Belson Stadium is a 2,168-seat soccer-specific stadium located at Utopia Parkway and Union Turnpike in Queens, New York City, on the campus of St. John's University. It is the home of the St. John's Red Storm men's and women's soccer teams. The stadium is unique in that it is built on an elevated platform over a mostly underground parking garage to save space in the dense urban environment of Queens.

== Overview ==
The stadium is named in honor of Maxine and Jerome Belson. Mr. Belson was a graduate of St. John's law school, a member of the university's board of trustees and a past benefactor to the university. The Belsons donated $6 million for the construction of the stadium and an additional $5 million was raised for the parking garage and landscaping.

The stadium is also the home field of the New York Pancyprian-Freedoms of the Cosmopolitan Soccer League of the United States Adult Soccer Association.

From 2013 to 2018, the stadium was the home field of F.A. Euro New York of USL League Two (USL2).

On November 13, 2016, the stadium hosted the Soccer Bowl, the championship game of the North American Soccer League (NASL), between the New York Cosmos and the Indy Eleven. The Cosmos won on penalties 4–2 in front of a crowd of 2,150. The Cosmos also played several U.S. Open Cup matches at the stadium in 2015 and 2016.

On February 24, 2022, it was announced that the New York City FC II of MLS Next Pro would become tenants of Belson Stadium as part of a partnership with St. John's University.
