= Tadeu Terra =

Brazilian footballer (born 1986)

Personal information
- Full name: Tadeu Souza Terra
- Date of birth: October 30, 1986 (age 40)
- Place of birth: Niterói (RJ), Brazil
- Height: 5 ft 8 in (1.73 m)
- Position: Midfielder

Youth career
- 2006–2010: St. Johns Red Storm

Senior career*
Years	Team	Apps	(Gls)
2007–2009	Long Island Rough Riders	35	(9)
2011	F.C. New York	20	(1)
2011	→ MyPa (loan)	7	(0)
- * Club domestic league appearances and goals as of October 30, 2011

Tadeu Souza Terra (born October 30, 1986, in Rio de Janeiro) is a Brazilian footballer who is currently without a club.

== Career ==
=== College and amateur ===
Terra came to the United States from his native Brazil in 2006 after being offered a college soccer scholarship by St. John's University in New York. He played in all 22 games for the Red Storm in his freshman season, ranking second on the team in assists and points, but was forced to sit out the 2007 as a medical redshirt after suffering an injury in pre-season. He returned to the field in 2008, earning third team NSCAA All-Northeast Region honors and an All-BIG EAST honorable mention, and was second team All-BIG EAST selection in his junior year in 2009. In 2010 Terra was a first team ALL-BIG EAST selection, and he finished his collegiate career with 16 goals and 15 assists.

During his college years Terra also played three seasons with the Long Island Rough Riders in the USL Premier Development League.

=== Professional ===
Terra signed his first professional contract in 2011 when he was signed by F.C. New York of the USL Professional Division. He made his professional debut on April 9, 2011, in New York's first-ever game, a 3–0 loss to Orlando City. Also in 2011, Terra led the USL Pro League in assists, and he was finalist for the USL Pro "Rookie of the Year" award.

At the end of the 2011 USL Pro season Terra signed a loan deal with Finnish club MyPa, which plays in the Veikkausliiga.
