= Jyler Noviello =

American soccer player

Personal information
- Date of birth: December 22, 1984 (age 41)
- Place of birth: Wilmington, North Carolina, U.S.
- Height: 6 ft 2 in (1.88 m)
- Position: Forward

College career
Years	Team	Apps	(Gls)
2002	South Georgia Tigers		
2003–2007	West Virginia Mountaineers		

Senior career*
Years	Team	Apps	(Gls)
2006	Atlanta Silverbacks U23's	16	(7)
2008–2009	Wilmington Hammerheads	33	(10)
2009–2010	Team Wellington		
2010	Real Maryland Monarchs	19	(6)
2011–2012	Wilmington Hammerheads	14	(4)

Managerial career
- 2006: Atlanta Silverbacks Academy
- 2016–2018: West Chester University (Assistant)
- 2019: Penn State Nittany Lions (Assistant)
- * Club domestic league appearances and goals as of September 16, 2011

Jyler Noviello (born December 22, 1984) is an American soccer player who most recently played for Wilmington Hammerheads in the USL Professional Division. Noviello is currently coaching with the Penn Fusion Soccer Academy.

== Career ==
=== College ===
Noviello grew up in Atlanta, Georgia, attended North Cobb High School where he school records for goals in a season (34), career goals (52), goals in a game (6) and assists in a game (4), and played one season of college soccer at South Georgia College before transferring to West Virginia University as a sophomore. At West Virginia he was a member of 2003 all-region team and the 2004 NSCAA all-south team.

In 2006 Noviello also played a season in the USL Premier Development League with the Atlanta Silverbacks U23's, and was his team's top scorer.

=== Professional ===
Noviello turned professional in 2008 when he joined the Wilmington Hammerheads in the USL Second Division. He made his professional debut on May 17, 2008, as a substitute in a 1–1 tie with the Harrisburg City Islanders.

He gained a certain amount of notoriety at Wilmington when he scored a spectacular goal from the right wing in a game against the Pittsburgh Riverhounds in June 2008.

After spending the 2010 season with Real Maryland Monarchs, Noviello returned to Wilmington Hammerheads for 2011 when he signed with the club on March 7, 2011.

== Honors ==
=== Wilmington Hammerheads ===
- USL Second Division Regular Season Champions (1): 2009
