= F.C. New York =

- Full name: Football Club New York
- Founded: 2009
- Dissolved: 2012
- Stadium: Belson Stadium (2011) rotating Long Island venues (2012)
- Capacity: 2,168 (2011)
- Owners: Jo-Ellen Treiber; Doug Petersen
- Head Coach: Paul Shaw
- League: USL Pro (2011); NPSL (2012)
- Website: http://www.fcnyvictory.com/
Home colors	Away colors

F.C. New York was an American professional soccer team based first in Queens, New York City, and then Long Island, New York. The team played two seasons, starting in 2011 in the National Division of the USL Professional Division, the third tier of the American Soccer Pyramid and then moving to the National Premier Soccer League for 2012. The club did not finish its 2012 schedule before folding.

The team played its home games at Belson Stadium on the grounds of St. John's University in Jamaica, Queens. The club's colors were yellow and sky blue, and it was coached by former Arsenal player Paul Shaw, following the resignation of manager Matt Weston partway through the club's inaugural season.

== History ==
F.C. New York was initially set to begin play in 2010 as an expansion member of the USL First Division, the second tier of the American Soccer Pyramid. The team announced that it would not play in 2010 due to the majority of other USL clubs forming the new NASL (North American Soccer League) and leaving USL. The United States Soccer Federation refused to sanction the new league. In January 2010, the USSF elected to operate an interim USSF Division 2 Professional League for the 2010 season, comprising twelve teams from both the NASL and USL-1. As USL did not have enough of its own clubs, F.C.New York utilized a contract clause to sit out a year.

The team played its first match in the newly formed USL Pro on April 9, 2011, a 3–0 loss to Orlando City. They also lost to the same Orlando team 2–1 in their home opener at Belson on April 30, 2011, in front of 2,011 fans. The team won its first competitive game on May 13, 1–0 away to Charleston Battery with a 35th-minute goal by Graciano Brito. The team finished 5th in the National Division with a 6-11-7 record. Jhonny Arteaga was the team and league scoring champion with 13 goals. Tadeu Terra lead the league with 8 assists.

They did not return for the 2012 USL Pro season. In February 2012, the team announced that it would be joining the NPSL. After a 2-8-4 season, including the cancellation of many of its home matches, F.C. New York left the NPSL and disappeared soon after.

== Colors and badge ==
According to an official press release, the F.C. New York shield was representative of the flag of the borough of Queens, New York City. The blue background with a horizontal white stripe was symbolic of Queens's first Dutch governor Willem Kieft, who acquired the area from the Native Americans. The first settlers of Queens were represented by the two flowers — the tulip, emblematic of the Dutch, and the Tudor rose of the English. The Queen's crown signified the name of the county and borough of Queens.

== Sponsorship controversy ==
During the 2012 Presidential election, an anonymous donor paid to put Mitt Romney's campaign logo and slogan across the front of the team's jerseys. The deal was scrapped before they could wear the jerseys in a game, as FIFA regulations prohibit "political, religious or personal statements" on uniforms.

== Stadium ==
F.C. New York originally had a commitment with Hofstra University to use James M. Shuart Stadium and their state-of-the-art training facilities. The 13,000-seat stadium was planned to host league and international exhibition matches. In January 2011 the club announced that Belson Stadium on the grounds of St. John's University in Jamaica, Queens would be the team's home.

Following the 2011 season, the university decided to replace Belson's artificial turf, forcing F.C. New York to schedule its home games at a variety of venues on Long Island. In June 2012, the visiting Brooklyn Italians complained about the venue and were awarded a default win. Venue issues continued, and F.C. New York canceled the rest of their home matches starting in July.

== Record ==
=== Year-by-year ===
Year	Division	League	Regular season	Playoffs	U.S. Open Cup
2011	3	USL Pro	5th, National	did not qualify	3rd round
2012	4	NPSL	8th, Atlantic	did not qualify	did not qualify

== Average attendance ==
Attendance stats are calculated by averaging each team's self-reported home attendances from the historical match archive at uslsoccer.com

- 2011: 819
