= 2014 Dayton Dutch Lions season =

Dayton Dutch Lions
2014 season
- Manager: Sid van Druenen
- Stadium: Dayton Outpatient Center Stadium
- USL Pro: TBD
- USL Pro Playoffs: TBD
- U.S. Open Cup: Third Round Exit
- Top goalscorer: League: Aaron Schoenfeld (12); All: Aaron Schoenfeld (13)
- Highest home attendance: 1,026 (April 11 v. Rochester)
- Lowest home attendance: 213 (May 4 v. Charleston)
- Average home league attendance: 624

The 2014 Dayton Dutch Lions season was the club's fifth season of existence, and fourth consecutive season of playing in the third division of American soccer. The club played in USL Pro.

== Roster ==
Note: Flags indicate national team as defined under FIFA eligibility rules; some limited exceptions apply. Players may hold more than one non-FIFA nationality. Squad correct as of March 27, 2014.

No.	Pos.	Nation	Player
1	GK	USA	Sean Teepen
2	MF	USA	Shane Smith
3	MF	TRI	Kevan George (on loan from Columbus Crew)
4	MF	USA	Matt Walker (on loan from Columbus Crew)
5	FW	USA	Eli Garner
6	MF	USA	Sébastien Thurière
7	MF	GEO	Irakli Khutsidze
8	MF	USA	Joel DeLass
9	MF	USA	David Clemens
11	MF	USA	Eric Kissinger
12	GK	USA	Brad Stuver (on loan from Columbus Crew)
14	FW	ESP	Jesjua Angoy-Cruyff
15	DF	BRA	Matheus Diovany
16	DF	USA	Brock Granger
17	MF	USA	Cameron Vickers
18	MF	USA	Eddie Hertsenberg
19	DF	USA	Ross Friedman (on loan from Columbus Crew)
20	FW	BRA	Guilherme Félix
21	MF	JPN	Shintaro Harada
22	FW	BRA	Jackson Beckham da Silva
23	FW	USA	Joe Broekhuizen
24	DF	USA	Taylor Bowlin
30	GK	USA	Matt Williams
45	FW	USA	Yannick Smith

== Competitions ==
=== USL Pro ===
==== Table ====
Pos	Team	Pld	W	T	L	GF	GA	GD	Pts
10	Oklahoma City Energy FC	28	9	5	14	32	37	−5	32
11	Pittsburgh Riverhounds	28	9	5	14	35	49	−14	32
12	Charlotte Eagles	28	9	4	15	33	40	−7	31
13	Orange County Blues FC	28	9	1	18	31	54	−23	28
14	Dayton Dutch Lions	28	6	4	18	28	63	−35	22

Source: USL Pro official standings
Rules for classification: 1) points; 2) goal difference; 3) number of goals scored.

=== Results summary ===
Overall								Home						Away					
Pld	W	D	L	GF	GA	GD	Pts	W	D	L	GF	GA	GD	W	D	L	GF	GA	GD
20	5	2	13	22	42	−20	17	0	2	8	7	21	−14	5	0	5	15	21	−6

Source: Match reports

Round	1	2	3	4	5	6	7	8	9	10	11	12	13	14	15	16	17	18	19	20	21	22	23	24	25	26	27	28
Stadium	A	A	H	A	H	H	H	A	H	H	A	A	A	A	H	A	H	A	H	H	H	H	A	A	A	H	A	H
Result	L	W	D	W	L	L	D	L	L	L	L	L	W	L	L	W	L	W	L	L								

Updated to match(es) played on July 19, 2014. Source: Match reports
A = Away; H = Home; W = Win; D = Draw; L = Loss

==== Match results ====
March 30, 2014 1	New York Red Bulls Reserve	3 - 0	Dayton Dutch Lions	Harrison, New Jersey
6:00 P.M.EDT	Bustamante 51'; Stevenson 61'; Miazga 66'	Report	Harada (yellow card) 47'; Baiden (yellow card) 74'; Schoenfeld (yellow card) 88'	Stadium: Red Bull Arena; Referee: Robert Sibiga

April 4, 2014 2	Charlotte Eagles	0 - 1	Dayton Dutch Lions	Charlotte, North Carolina
6:00 P.M.EDT		Report; Report	Granger 40'; George (yellow card) 80' da Silva (yellow card) 89'	Stadium: Dickson Field; Attendance: 581; Referee: Christopher Spivey

April 11, 2014 3	Dayton Dutch Lions	1 - 1	Rochester Rhinos	Beavercreek, Ohio
7:00 P.M.EDT	Broekhuizen 90+4'	Report	Petrone 28'	Stadium: Beavercreek High School Stadium; Attendance: 1,026; Referee: Branton Artis

April 19, 2014 4	Harrisburg City Islanders	0 - 1	Dayton Dutch Lions	Harrisburg, Pennsylvania
7:00 P.M.EDT	Noble (yellow card) 40'	Report	Thurière (yellow card) 25'; Schoenfeld 41' (pen.); Harada (yellow card) 45'	Stadium: Skyline Sports Complex; Attendance: 1,711; Referee: Dimitar Chavdarov

April 26, 2014 5	Dayton Dutch Lions	1 - 5	Richmond Kickers	Beavercreek, Ohio
7:00pm EDT	Garner 4'; Smith (red card) 54'	Report	Davis IV 9'; Delicâte 26' 75'; Vercollone 55' (pen.); Spitz 68'	Stadium: Beavercreek High School Stadium; Attendance: 523

May 4, 2014 6	Dayton Dutch Lions	0 - 2	Charleston Battery	Beavercreek, Ohio
7:00pm EDT		Report	Cordoves 37'; Salgado 87'	Stadium: Beavercreek High School Stadium; Attendance: 213

May 10, 2014 7	Dayton Dutch Lions	1 - 1	LA Galaxy II	West Carrollton, Ohio
7:00pm EDT	Schoenfeld 43' (pen.); Harada (red card) 65'; Cruyff (yellow card) 84'	Report	Hoffman 41'; Arreola (yellow card) 43'	Stadium: DOC Stadium; Attendance: 831

May 17, 2014 8	Harrisburg City Islanders	5 - 3	Dayton Dutch Lions	Harrisburg, Pennsylvania
2:00pm EDT	Baúque 19', 23'; Shaffer 47'; Langley (yellow card) 43' (goal) 83', 90'	Report	Schoenfeld 1', 69'; Garner 65'; Khutsidze (yellow card) 73'	Stadium: Skyline Sports Complex; Attendance: 1,417; Referee: Neil Barbulescu

May 25, 2014 9	Dayton Dutch Lions	1 - 2	Sacramento Republic FC	West Carrollton, Ohio
7:00pm EDT	Harada (yellow card) 39'; Schoenfeld 44' (pen.); Baiden (yellow card) 62'; Cruyff (yellow card) 90'	Report	Collins 13'; Delbridge (yellow card) 38'; Guzman 51'; López (yellow card) 90'	Stadium: DOC Stadium; Attendance: 527

June 1, 2014 10	Dayton Dutch Lions	0 - 1	Rochester Rhinos	West Carrollton, Ohio
7:00pm EDT	DeLass (yellow card) 15'	Report	Garzi (yellow card) 31'; Houapeu 46'	Stadium: DOC Stadium; Attendance: 456; Referee: Donovan Noocha

June 7, 2014 11	Orange County Blues FC	4-3	Dayton Dutch Lions	Irvine, California
10:00	Cortez 18' 64'; Suggs 19' (yellow card) 54'; Russell 22'; Peay (yellow card) 45'	Report	Walker 12'; Williams (yellow card) 53'; Garner 79'; DeLass 90'	Stadium: Anteater Stadium; Attendance: 706; Referee: Ramon Hernandez

June 8, 2014 12	LA Galaxy II	5 - 1	Dayton Dutch Lions	Carson, California
11:00	Jamieson 8' 45'; McBean 25', 39'; Stojkov (yellow card) 35'; Rugg 42'; Bowen (yellow card) 77'	Report	Schoenfeld 60'	Stadium: StubHub Center Track & Field Stadium; Attendance: 850; Referee: Adrian Gonzalez

June 11, 2014 13	Arizona United SC	1-2	Dayton Dutch Lions	Peoria, Arizona
10:30 pm	Wallace 18'; Delpiccolo (yellow card) 53'; Dillon (yellow card) 66'; Ruthven (yellow card) 68'	Summary	Schoenfeld 5' 36'; Garner (yellow card) 53'; Williams (yellow card) 89'	Stadium: Peoria Sports Complex; Attendance: 1,547; Referee: Jared Kennedy

June 20, 2014 14	Rochester Rhinos	2-0	Dayton Dutch Lions	Rochester, New York
7:35 pm	Sundly (yellow card) 13'; Houapeu 54'; Banks 61'	Summary		Stadium: Sahlen's Stadium; Attendance: 5,453; Referee: Juan Carlos Rivero

June 22, 2014 15	Dayton Dutch Lions	0-2	Orlando City	West Carrollton, Ohio
3:00 pm	Broekhuizen (yellow card) 47'; Garner (yellow card) 51'	Summary	Mbengue 53'; Molino 90'	Stadium: DOC Stadium; Attendance: 275; Referee: Joshua Brooks

June 28, 2014 16	Pittsburgh Riverhounds	0-1	Dayton Dutch Lions	Pittsburgh, Pennsylvania
7:00 pm	Earls (yellow card) 39'; Obodai (yellow card) 79'	Summary	Garner 18'; Walker (yellow card) 43'; Thurière (yellow card) 66'; Clemens (yellow card) 89'	Stadium: Highmark Stadium; Attendance: 2457; Referee: Jeff Forward

July 1, 2014 17	Dayton Dutch Lions	1-2	Pittsburgh Riverhounds	West Carrollton, Ohio
		Summary		Stadium: DOC Stadium; Attendance: 363

July 5, 2014 18	Charlotte Eagles	1-3	Dayton Dutch Lions	Charlotte, North Carolina
		Summary		Stadium: Dickson Field

July 12, 2014 19	Dayton Dutch Lions	1-3	Harrisburg City Islanders	West Carrollton, Ohio
7:00 pm	Vickers (yellow card) 51'; Granger 77' (pen.); Mendez (yellow card) 83'; Garner (yellow card) 90'	Summary	Pettis 4'; McLaughlin 35'; Derschang 90'	Stadium: DOC Stadium; Attendance: 334; Referee: Matt Fotia

July 19, 2014 20	Dayton Dutch Lions	1 - 2	Charlotte Eagles	West Carrollton, Ohio
7:00 pm	Walker 22'	Report	David Estrada 34'; Toby 60'	Stadium: DOC Stadium; Attendance: 520; Referee: Ali Banane

July 26, 2014 21	Dayton Dutch Lions	0–3	Oklahoma City Energy FC	West Carrollton, Ohio
				Stadium: DOC Stadium; Attendance: 437

August 2, 2014 22	Dayton Dutch Lions	0–1	Harrisburg City Islanders	West Carrollton, Ohio
				Stadium: DOC Stadium; Attendance: 396

August 8, 2014 23	Charleston Battery	2–2	Dayton Dutch Lions	Charleston, South Carolina
				Stadium: Blackbaud Stadium; Attendance: 3,081

August 9, 2014 24	Wilmington Hammerheads	1–2	Dayton Dutch Lions	Wilmington, North Carolina
				Stadium: Legion Stadium; Attendance: 2,397

August 16, 2014 25	Richmond Kickers	1–1	Dayton Dutch Lions	Richmond, Virginia
				Stadium: City Stadium; Attendance: 3,504

August 23, 2014 26	Dayton Dutch Lions	1–2	Colorado Rapids Reserves	West Carrollton, Ohio
				Stadium: DOC Stadium; Attendance: 924

August 31, 2014 27	Orlando City	7–0	Dayton Dutch Lions	Lake Buena Vista, Florida
				Stadium: Hess Field 17, ESPN WWOS; Attendance: 4,810

September 5, 2014 28	Dayton Dutch Lions	0–4	Wilmington Hammerheads	West Carrollton, Ohio
				Stadium: DOC Stadium; Attendance: 630

=== U.S. Open Cup ===
==== Second round ====
May 14, 2014	FC Schwaben AC	0 - 2	Dayton Dutch Lions	Buffalo Grove, Illinois
5:00pm EST	Kirk (yellow card)	Report	Garner 37'; Cruyff 70'; Cruyff (yellow card); Thurière (yellow card); Bowlin (yellow card); Walker (yellow card)	Stadium: Schwaben Athletic Club

==== Third round ====
May 28, 2014	Indy Eleven	5 - 2	Dayton Dutch Lions	Indianapolis, Indiana
7:30pm EST	Corrado (yellow card) 19'; Smith 26', 30', 88'; Ambersley 43'; Mares 46'; Hyland (yellow card) 66'; Moore (yellow card) 82'	Report	Walker (yellow card) 25' (goal) 76'; Schoenfeld 66' (pen.); DeLass (yellow card) 85'	Stadium: Carroll Stadium; Attendance: 9,181

== Statistics ==
=== Goals ===
R	Player	Position	USL Pro	Open Cup	Total
1	(United States) Aaron Schoenfeld	F	12	1	13
2	(United States) Thomas Garner	F	4	1	5
3	(United States) Brock Granger	D	2	0	2
3	(United States) Matt Walker	M	1	1	2
4	(United States) Joe Broekhuizen	F	1	0	1
4	(Spain) Jesjua Angoy-Cruyff	F	0	1	1
4	(United States) Joel DeLass	M	1	0	1

=== Assists ===
R	Player	Position	USL Pro	Open Cup	Total
1	(United States) Joe Broekhuizen	F	0	2	2
1	(United States) Ross Friedman	D	2	0	2
2	(United States) Joel DeLass	M	1	0	1
2	(United States) Shane Smith	D	1	0	1
2	(United States) Thomas Garner	F	1	0	1
2	(United States) Aaron Schoenfeld	F	1	0	1
2	(United States) Sébastien Thurière	M	1	0	1
2	(Spain) Jesjua Angoy-Cruyff	F	0	1	1
2	(Brazil) Guilherme Ribeiro Félix	F	1	0	1
2	(Japan) Shintaro Harada	M	1	0	1
2	(United States) Cameron Vickers	F	1	0	1
