= 2014 Charlotte Eagles season =

Charlotte Eagles
2014 season
- Owner: (United States) Pat Stewart
- Manager: (United States) Mark Steffens
- Stadium: Dickson Field
- Highest home attendance: 1,261 (April 25 v. Chicago Reserves)
- Lowest home attendance: 556 (June 7 v. Oklahoma City)
- Average home league attendance: 914
Home colors	Away colors

The 2014 Charlotte Eagles season was the club's 22nd season of existence, their fourth season playing in the USL Professional Division.

== USL Pro ==
All times from this point on Eastern Daylight Saving Time (UTC-04:00)

=== Results summary ===
Overall								Home						Away					
Pld	W	D	L	GF	GA	GD	Pts	W	D	L	GF	GA	GD	W	D	L	GF	GA	GD
25	9	3	13	29	35	−6	30	5	1	4	14	10	+4	4	2	9	15	25	−10

Source: Match reports

Round	1	2	3	4	5	6	7	8	9	10	11	12	13	14	15	16	17	18	19	20	21	22	23	24	25	26	27	28
Stadium	H	H	H	A	A	A	A	A	A	H	H	H	H	A	A	H	A	H	A	A	H	A	A	A	H	H	H	H
Result	L	W	L	W	L	L	W	L	L	L	D	L	W	D	W	L	D	L	L	W	W	L	L	W	W			

Updated to match(es) played on August 16, 2014. Source: Match reports
A = Away; H = Home; W = Win; D = Draw; L = Loss

=== League results ===
April 4, 2014 1	Charlotte Eagles	0–1	Dayton Dutch Lions	Charlotte, North Carolina
7:00 pm		Report	Granger 40'; George (yellow card) 80' da Silva (yellow card) 89'	Stadium: Dickson Field; Attendance: 591; Referee: Christopher Spivey

April 12, 2014 2	Charlotte Eagles	2–1	Richmond Kickers	Charlotte, North Carolina
7:00 pm	Guzman 54'; Herrera 89'; Gentile (yellow card) 90'	Report	Seaton 32'; Asante (yellow card) 48'	Stadium: Dickson Field; Attendance: 712; Referee: Mark Kadlecik

April 25, 2014 3	Charlotte Eagles	2–3	Chicago Fire Reserves	Charlotte, North Carolina
7:00 pm	Boggs 12'; Herrera 15'	Report	Anangonó 20', 53'; Watson (yellow card) 21'; Palmer (yellow card) 30'; Amarikwa 45'	Stadium: Dickson Field; Attendance: 1,261; Referee: Dustin Thorne

April 26, 2014 4	Wilmington Hammerheads	0–2	Charlotte Eagles	Wilmington, North Carolina
7:30 pm	Parratt (yellow card) 49'	Report	Thompson 56'; Yates 90'	Stadium: Legion Stadium; Attendance: 2,634; Referee: Matthew Jozaitis

May 3, 2014 5	Arizona United SC	2–1	Charlotte Eagles	Peoria, Arizona
10:10 pm	Dacres 42'; Baladez 64'	Report	Herrera 76'	Stadium: Peoria Sports Complex; Attendance: 2,755; Referee: Alejandro Mariscal

May 5, 2014 6	LA Galaxy II	2–1	Charlotte Eagles	Carson, California
10:30 pm	Rugg 28'; Garcia (yellow card) 51'; Hoffman 55'	Report	Toby (yellow card) 14'; Herrera 35' (pen.); Gold (yellow card) 44'; Gentile (yellow card) 52'; Leathers (yellow card) 61'	Stadium: StubHub Center Track & Field Stadium; Attendance: 410; Referee: Ramon Hernandez

May 8, 2014 7	Orange County Blues FC	0–2	Charlotte Eagles	Irvine, California
10:30 pm	Okai (yellow card) 24'	Report	Yates 33'; Newnam 58'; Leathers (yellow card) 90'	Stadium: Anteater Stadium; Attendance: 431; Referee: Bernhard Hosu

May 21, 2014 8	Orlando City	3–1	Charlotte Eagles	Lake Buena Vista, Florida
7:30 pm	Molino 11', 31', 77'	Report	Thompson (yellow card) 12'; Duckett (yellow card) 56'; Gentile 79'	Stadium: Hess Field 17, ESPN WWOS; Attendance: 4,219; Referee: Lance Vanhaitsma

May 24, 2014 9	Richmond Kickers	2–0	Charlotte Eagles	Richmond, Virginia
7:00 pm	Davis 39', 63'; Lee (yellow card) 59'	Report	Newnam (yellow card) 31'	Stadium: City Stadium; Attendance: 2,677; Referee: Mark Gorak

May 31, 2014 10	Charlotte Eagles	1–2	Wilmington Hammerheads	Charlotte, North Carolina
7:00 pm	Gentile (yellow card) 51'; Yates 90'	Report	Aparicio 12'; Miller 32'; Musa (yellow card) 71'; Ochoa (yellow card) 73'	Stadium: Dickson Field; Attendance: 1,092; Referee: Jeremy L.B. Smith

June 7, 2014 11	Charlotte Eagles	1–1	Oklahoma City Energy FC	Charlotte, North Carolina
7:00 pm	Herrera (yellow card) 34'; Thompson 48'	Report	Perry 33'; Wyatt (yellow card) 39'	Stadium: Dickson Field; Attendance: 556; Referee: Jon Freemon

June 13, 2014 12	Charlotte Eagles	0–1	Orange County Blues FC	Charlotte, North Carolina
8:00 pm	Thompson (yellow card) 90'	Report	Suggs (yellow card) 36' (yellow-red card); Okai (yellow card) 58'; Santana 80'	Stadium: Dickson Field; Attendance: 738; Referee: Katja Koroleva

June 21, 2014 13	Charlotte Eagles	3–1	Charleston Battery	Charlotte, North Carolina
7:00 pm	Guzman 2' (yellow card) 70'; Sekyere 28'; Newman (yellow card) 61'; Herrera 65' (yellow card) 90'; Yates (yellow card) 81'	Report	Falvey (yellow card) 27'; Chang 45'	Stadium: Dickson Field; Attendance: 698; Referee: Chris Spivey

June 27, 2014 14	Harrisburg City Islanders	1–1	Charlotte Eagles	Harrisburg, Pennsylvania
7:00 pm	Barril (yellow card) 45'; Andrews 90'	Report	Sekyere 57'	Stadium: Skyline Sports Complex; Attendance: 1,835; Referee: Darth Newman

June 28, 2014 15	Rochester Rhinos	0–1	Charlotte Eagles	Rochester, New York
7:05 pm		Report	Brandao 52'	Stadium: Sahlen's Stadium; Attendance: 6,179; Referee: John Douglas

July 5, 2014 16	Charlotte Eagles	1–3	Dayton Dutch Lions	Charlotte, North Carolina
8:00 pm	Leathers 59'; Kann (red card) 78'; Guzman (yellow card) 81'	Report	Schoenfeld 8' 76' 80'; Guilherme Félix (yellow card) 56'	Stadium: Dickson Field; Attendance: 700; Referee: Doug Hartemann

July 12, 2014 17	Charleston Battery	0 - 0	Charlotte Eagles	Charleston, South Carolina
7:30 pm		Report		Stadium: Blackbaud Stadium; Attendance: 4,698

July 14, 2014 18	Charlotte Eagles	0 - 1	Sacramento Republic FC	Charlotte, North Carolina
7:00 pm	Guzman (yellow card) 45'; Sekyere (yellow card) 84'	Report	Stewart 10'	Stadium: Dickson Field; Attendance: 647; Referee: Dustin Thorne

July 17, 2014 19	Pittsburgh Riverhounds	2 - 0	Charlotte Eagles	Pittsburgh, Pennsylvania
7:00 pm	Arena (yellow card) 56'; Kerr 68'; Angulo 81'	Report	Thompson (yellow card) 35' (yellow-red card)	Stadium: Highmark Stadium; Referee: Charles Murphy

July 19, 2014 20	Dayton Dutch Lions	1 - 2	Charlotte Eagles	Dayton, Ohio
7:00 pm	Walker 22'	Report	David Estrada 34'; Toby 60'	Stadium: Beavercreek High School Stadium; Attendance: 520; Referee: Ali Banane

July 26, 2014 21	Charlotte Eagles	2 - 0	Wilmington Hammerheads	Charlotte, North Carolina
7:00 pm	Newman 26'; Herrera (yellow card) 62' (goal) 70'; Russell (yellow card) 90'	Report	Cole (yellow card) 20'; Nicholson (yellow card) 77'; Godelman (yellow card) 90'	Stadium: Dickson Field; Attendance: 933; Referee: (United States) Jeremy Smith

August 2, 2014 23	Orlando City	4 - 1	Charlotte Eagles	Lake Buena Vista, Florida
7:30 pm	Chin 45'; Turner 48'; Molino 51' 60'	Report	Guzman (red card) 50'; Thompson (yellow card) 75'	Stadium: Hess Field 17, ESPN WWOS; Attendance: 5,029; Referee: (United States) Christina Unkel

August 9, 2014 24	Richmond Kickers	2–1	Charlotte Eagles	Richmond, Virginia
7:00 pm	Davis IV 18'; Vercollone 27' (yellow card) 61'		Herrera (yellow card) 52' (goal) 53'; Leathers (yellow card) 59'; Greer (yellow card) 86'; Dixon (yellow card) 87'	Stadium: City Stadium; Attendance: 2,549; Referee: (United States) Robert Chamberlain

August 16, 2014 25	Charlotte Eagles	3–1	Rochester Rhinos	Charlotte, North Carolina
7:00 pm		Report		Stadium: Dickson Field; Attendance: 850

August 20, 2014 26	Charlotte Eagles	2–0	Orlando City	Charlotte, North Carolina
7:00 pm		Report		Stadium: Dickson Field; Attendance: 498

August 29, 2014 27	Charlotte Eagles	0–1	Pittsburgh Riverhounds	Charlotte, North Carolina
7:00 pm		Report		Stadium: Dickson Field; Attendance: 550

September 1, 2014 22	Montreal Impact Reserves	1-1	Charlotte Eagles	Montreal, Quebec
1:00 pm		Report		Stadium: CS Claude-Robillard; Attendance: 250

September 6, 2014 28	Charlotte Eagles	2–4	Harrisburg City Islanders	Charlotte, North Carolina
7:00 pm		Report		Stadium: Dickson Field; Attendance: 627

=== Standings ===
Pos	Team	Pld	W	T	L	GF	GA	GD	Pts
10	Oklahoma City Energy FC	28	9	5	14	32	37	−5	32
11	Pittsburgh Riverhounds	28	9	5	14	35	49	−14	32
12	Charlotte Eagles	28	9	4	15	33	40	−7	31
13	Orange County Blues FC	28	9	1	18	31	54	−23	28
14	Dayton Dutch Lions	28	6	4	18	28	63	−35	22

Source: USL Pro official standings
Rules for classification: 1) points; 2) goal difference; 3) number of goals scored.

== U.S. Open Cup ==
May 14, 2014 Second Round	Charlotte Eagles	3 - 1	Carolina Dynamo	Charlotte, North Carolina
7:00 p.m.	Guzman 43'; Herrera 57'	Report	Nyepon 60'	Stadium: Dickson Field

May 29, 2014 Third Round	Carolina Railhawks	2 - 0	Charlotte Eagles	Cary, North Carolina
7:30 p.m.	Albadawi 14'; Au. King (yellow card) 15'; Ståhl (yellow card) 37'; Davidson 45'	Report	Thompson (yellow card) 80'	Stadium: WakeMed Soccer Park; Attendance: 1,432

== Club ==
=== Roster ===
As of March 23, 2014

No.	Position	Nation	Player
1	GK	USA	Brock Duckworth
2	MF	GHA	Fred Sekyere
3	DF	USA	Bilal Duckett
5	DF	USA	Ben Newnam
6	DF	USA	Chase Wickham
7	FW	USA	Zak Boggs
8	MF	USA	Juan Guzman
9	MF	USA	Wells Thompson
10	MF	COL	Jorge Herrera
11	MF	COL	Mario Gomez
12	MF	USA	Drew Yates
13	MF	USA	Matt Gold
14	FW	USA	David Geno
15	DF	USA	Tolani Ibikunle
16	DF	JAM	Richard Dixon
17	MF	USA	Tyrone Hall
19	FW	BRA	Gui Brandao
20	DF	USA	Jonathan Leathers
21	DF	USA	J. J. Greer
24	MF	KEN	Felix Oblio
26	GK	GUM	Doug Herrick
27	GK	USA	Kyle Renfro

== See also ==
- 2014 in American soccer
- 2014 USL Pro season
- Charlotte Eagles
