= 2012 Dayton Dutch Lions season =

Dayton Dutch Lions
2012 season
- Owner: (Netherlands) Erik Tammer (Netherlands) Mike Mossel
- Head coach: (Netherlands) Ivar van Dinteren
- Stadium: Miami Valley South Stadium
- USL Pro: TBD
- USL Pro Playoffs: TBD
- U.S. Open Cup: Fourth round
Home colors	Away colors

The 2012 Dayton Dutch Lions season was the club's third season of existence, as well as their second season of playing professional soccer. The Dutch Lions played in the USL Professional Division, the third-tier of American soccer.

Outside the USL Pro the Dutch Lions entered the U.S. Open Cup in the second round proper of the tournament.

== Competitions ==
=== USL Pro ===
==== Standings ====
Pos	Team	Pld	W	T	L	GF	GA	GD	Pts	Qualification
1	Orlando City SC (C)	24	17	6	1	50	18	+32	57	Commissioner's Cup, Playoffs 1st round bye
2	Rochester Rhinos (A)	24	12	5	7	27	23	+4	41	Playoffs 1st round bye
3	Charleston Battery (A)	24	12	2	10	36	26	+10	38	Playoffs
4	Richmond Kickers (A)	24	11	5	8	31	27	+4	38	Playoffs
5	Wilmington Hammerheads (A)	24	10	7	7	34	32	+2	37	Playoffs
6	Harrisburg City Islanders (A)	24	10	7	7	34	29	+5	37	Playoffs
7	Charlotte Eagles	24	11	3	10	34	26	+8	36	
8	Los Angeles Blues	24	9	3	12	26	29	−3	30	
9	Dayton Dutch Lions	24	4	10	10	20	29	−9	22	
10	Pittsburgh Riverhounds	24	4	5	15	20	39	−19	17	
11	Antigua Barracuda	24	5	1	18	16	50	−34	16	

Source: USL Pro official standings
Rules for classification: Points, then tiebreak: 1) Head-to-head record based on total points in League games, 2) Total wins in League games, 3) Goal difference in League games, 4) Goals scored in League games, etc.
(A) Advances to USL Pro Playoffs; (C) Commissioner's Cup (best regular season record)

=== U.S. Open Cup ===
May 22, 2012 Second round	Chicago Fire Premier (Illinois)	1–2	(Ohio) Dayton Dutch Lions	Bridgeview, Illinois
18:30 CST	King 90'	Report	Garner 38'; Holowaty 90+2'	Stadium: Toyota Park Practice Field

May 29, 2012 Third round	Columbus Crew (Ohio)	1–2	(Ohio) Dayton Dutch Lions	Columbus, Ohio
18:30 CST	Finlay (yellow card) 45+'; Vargas 61' (pen.)	Report	Bardsley (yellow card) 33' (goal) 81'; Bartels 79'; Knotek (yellow card) 87'	Stadium: Crew Stadium

June 5, 2012 Fourth round	Michigan Bucks	v	(Ohio) Dayton Dutch Lions	Pontiac, Michigan
18:30 CST				Stadium: Ultimate Soccer Arenas
