= Dutch Lions (disambiguation) =

Dutch Lions is the common name for the Netherlands national American football team.

Dutch Lions may also refer to:

- Dutch Lions Capital Group BV, a USA soccer owning group
  - Cincinnati Dutch Lions, an amateur soccer team in Cincinnati, Ohio, USA
  - Dayton Dutch Lions, an amateur soccer team in Dayton, Ohio, USA
  - East Atlanta Dutch Lions FC, an amateur soccer team in Atlanta, Georgia, USA
  - Houston Dutch Lions, an amateur soccer team in Houston, Texas, USA
  - Florida Gulf Coast Dutch Lions, an amateur soccer team in Cape Coral, Florida, USA
  - New York City Dutch Lions, an amateur soccer team in New York City, New York, USA
