= Oscar Moens =

Dutch footballer (born 1973)

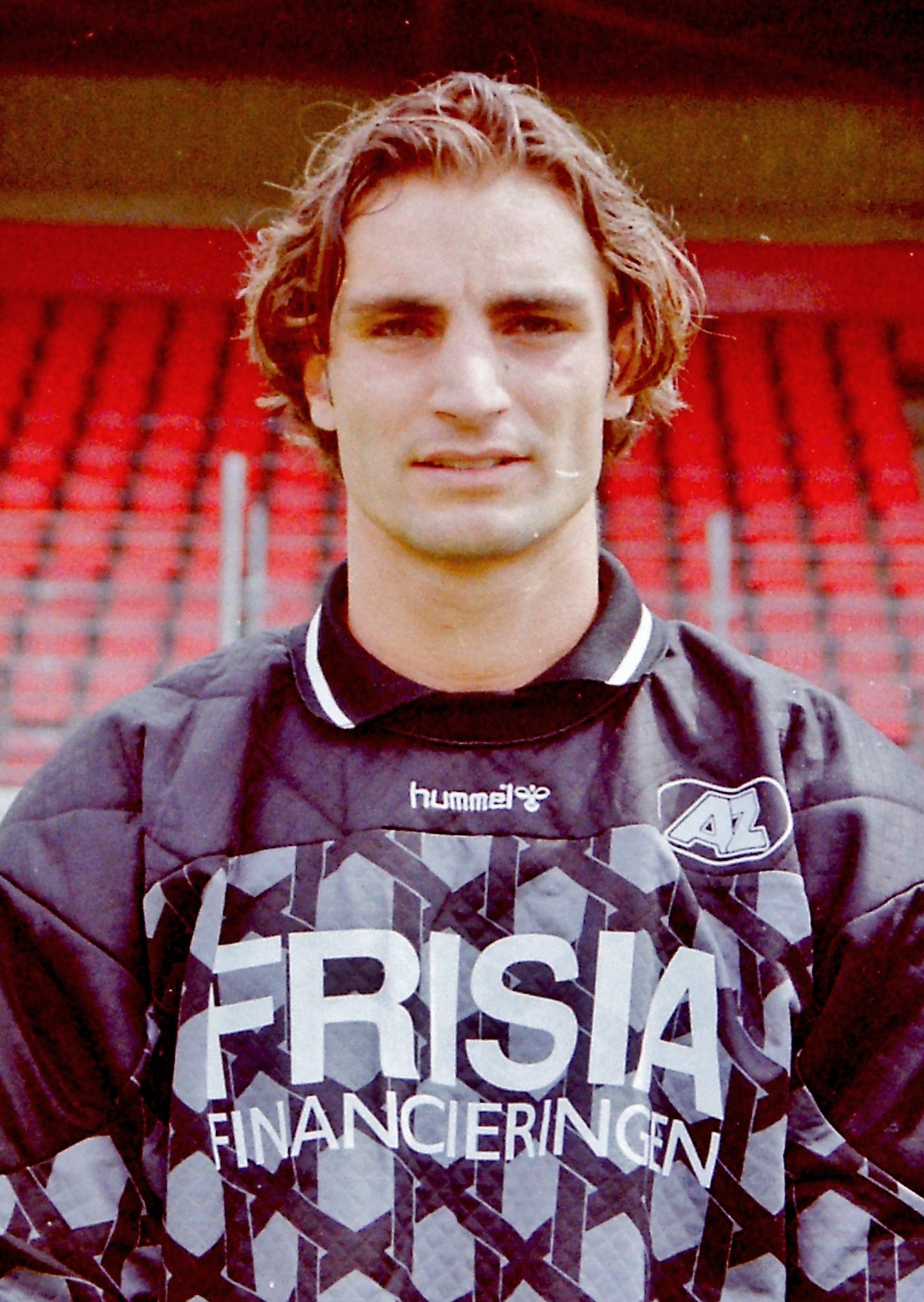
- Moens with AZ Alkmaar in 1997

Personal information
- Date of birth: 1 April 1973 (age 53)
- Place of birth: 's-Gravenzande, Netherlands
- Height: 1.90 m (6 ft 3 in)
- Position: Goalkeeper

Youth career
- MSV '71
- Ajax

Senior career*
Years	Team	Apps	(Gls)
1990–1992	SVV/Dordrecht '90	0	(0)
1992–1995	Excelsior	109	(0)
1995–1996	Go Ahead Eagles	21	(0)
1996–2003	AZ Alkmaar	180	(0)
2000	→ RBC Roosendaal (loan)	14	(0)
2003–2004	Genoa	0	(0)
2004–2006	Willem II	45	(0)
2006–2007	PSV	2	(0)
2008–2009	Willem II	0	(0)
2010	Dayton Dutch Lions	15	(0)
2010–2011	Sparta Rotterdam	15	(0)
Total		401	(0)

International career
1998–2001	Netherlands	2	(0)
- * Club domestic league appearances and goals

Oscar Moens (born 1 April 1973) is a Dutch retired footballer who played as a goalkeeper. After his retirement, he has held positions in the coaching staff of Sparta Rotterdam and Feyenoord.

== Club career ==
=== Early career ===
Moens was born in 's-Gravenzande but raised in Maassluis. A youth prospect of Ajax – who had scouted him from his local club MSV '71 – Moens began his professional football career at second-tier Eerste Divisie team SVV in the 1990–91 season, where he was the backup to Joop Hiele. The team merged with Dordrecht '90 after his first season at the club, forming SVV/Dordrecht'90. For the 1992–93 season he transferred to Excelsior, where he emerged as a starter. He was then signed by Go Ahead Eagles in the winter of 1995–96 as this gave him the opportunity to play in the Eredivisie. At the end of this season he was brought to AZ Alkmaar for the sum of ƒ750,000 (€340,000).

=== AZ ===
At AZ, he played from 1996–97 to 1999–2000 as a member of the starting line-up, and he was called up for the national team. Chairman Dirk Scheringa was so content with Moens' performance that AZ offered him an – for the Eredivisie at the time – unprecedented ten-year contract, which included a payment for his image rights exclusive for his financial service company DSB Bank. This contract did not pass the scrutiny of the Belastingdienst (Tax and Customs Administration) however, and a subsequent conflict between Moens and Scheringa resulted in Moens calling in sick at the end of the 1999–2000 season. As a result, he was suspended from the first team indefinitely.

In the 2000–01 season he was loaned out to RBC Roosendaal. With this club he played 14 games and halfway through the 2000–01 season, he was called back to AZ Alkmaar where he played until 2002–03.

=== Later career ===
In December 2003, Italian Serie B club Genoa contracted Moens, although he never played a match for this club. Only a few months later, in May 2004, Willem II signed him as a free agent, where he was set to replace Geert De Vlieger.

In 2004–05 Moens had a strong first season, earning him a recall to the Netherlands national team. In 2005–06, however, he suffered an injury which only allowed him to play 11 games. In the summer of 2006 he moved to PSV, as second keeper behind Heurelho Gomes, replacing Edwin Zoetebier who had moved to NAC Breda. He then retired in 2007, but returned to the game in 2008, rejoining Willem II.

=== United States ===
In December 2009 Moens was approached by Erik Tammer, with whom he played at Go Ahead Eagles in 1995–96, who asked him to join the fledgling Dayton Dutch Lions team, which will debut in the USL Premier Development League in 2010. Moens agreed, and would play for Dayton from April to August 2010. In December 2010, he returned to the Netherlands, where he joined Sparta Rotterdam. Although he extended his contract for a year in May 2011 he ended his career at the end of the 2010–11 season.

== International career ==
Moens made two appearances for the Netherlands national team. On 13 October 1998 he played his first international match in a friendly with Ghana in the Gelredome in Arnhem, which ended in 0–0. His second appearance was on 10 November 2001 against Denmark where he played the entire match. The final score was 1–1, with Jimmy Floyd Hasselbaink scoring for Holland.

== Coaching career ==
After retiring at Sparta Rotterdam, Moens picked up a commercial job at the club. In May 2014, it was announced that he had been appointed youth coach at the Feyenoord Academy, where he would specialise in coaching goalkeepers. He became goalkeepers' coordinator for Feyenoord two years later. He left the position in February 2020 after disagreements with management.
