= Western Michigan Christian High School =

Location
- 455 E. Ellis Road; Norton Shores, Michigan 49441; United States; 43.161825°N 86.234361°W

Information
- Type: Private school
- Motto: Rise Up
- Established: 1948
- Principal: Chris Ruiter
- Faculty: 27
- Grades: 7-12
- Enrollment: 294 (2013-2014)
- Student to teacher ratio: 12
- Campus type: Central City
- Colors: Green and white
- Athletics conference: Independent
- Mascot: Warriors
- Website: www.wmchs.net

Western Michigan Christian High School (commonly Western Michigan Christian, WMCHS, or WMC) is a 7-12 private, Calvinist Christian school in Norton Shores, Michigan, United States. It is accredited by the Michigan Association of Non-Public Schools, and is a member of Christian Schools International (CSI).

The school is the flagship of West Michigan Christian Schools, a system of four Christian schools serving parts of Muskegon, Newaygo, Oceana, and Ottawa counties. Fremont Christian School and Grand Haven Christian School, both PK-8 schools, feed into WMCS, as does PK-6 Muskegon Christian School.

== History ==
Founded in 1948, the school is owned by the parents of the students it serves.

== Extracurricular activities ==
WMCHS has 17 athletic teams, drama, chapel, music programs, student council, numerous clubs as well as other voluntary student activities.

WMCHS won its third consecutive Class D state title in basketball, 9th all-time, March 27, 2010.

== Notable alumni ==
- Dan Bylsma - (class of 1988), played for the National Hockey League's Los Angeles Kings and Mighty Ducks of Anaheim, co-wrote several books with his father, and coached the Pittsburgh Penguins and Buffalo Sabres.
- Joel DeLass - (class of 2005), played professional soccer for the Dayton Dutch Lions of the United Soccer Leagues.
- Kate Reinders – (class of 1998), actress appearing in Broadway and television shows
