= Piada =

Piada, also known as piadina romagnola, is a flatbread from the historical region of Romagna, Italy.

Piada may also refer to:

- Piada dei morti, a focaccia dessert from Rimini, Italy
- Piada Italian Street Food, an Ohio restaurant chain
- Piada (moth), a synonym of the moth genus Anuga in the family Euteliidae
