= Jesjua Angoy-Cruyff =

Spanish-Dutch footballer (born 1993)

Personal information
- Full name: Jesjua Andrea Angoy Cruijff
- Date of birth: 11 March 1993 (age 33)
- Place of birth: Barcelona, Spain
- Height: 5 ft 11 in (1.80 m)
- Position: Midfielder

Youth career
- 2008–2011: Barcelona
- 2011–2013: Wigan Athletic
- 2013: Lausanne-Sport

Senior career*
Years	Team	Apps	(Gls)
2014	Dayton Dutch Lions	17	(0)
2015–2017	Reus	0	(0)
2015–2017	→ Morell (loan)	3	(0)
2017–2018	Suburense	1	(0)
- * Club domestic league appearances and goals as of 12 September 2014 ‡ National team caps and goals as of 21 April 2014

Jesjua Andrea Angoy Cruijff (born 11 March 1993), known as Jesjua Angoy-Cruyff, is a Spanish-Dutch footballer. He is the grandson of former Dutch international and coach Johan Cruyff.

== Personal life ==
Angoy-Cruyff is the grandson of Johan Cruyff, former coach and player for both FC Barcelona and Ajax. He is the son of Chantal Cruyff, Johan's daughter, and Jesús Angoy, a former goalkeeper for FC Barcelona. His uncle is former footballer Jordi Cruyff. Angoy-Cruyff was born in Barcelona while his father played for the club.

== Career ==
=== Youth ===
Between 2008 and 2011, Angoy-Cruyff played for the FC Barcelona’s Juvenil B youth academy. After failing to be promoted to the A-team, the player and the club mutually agreed to part ways after two years. After leaving Barcelona, he signed for Wigan Athletic, playing for their reserve team from 2011 to 2013. Prior to his signing at Wigan, Angoy-Cruyff was touted as one of the former Barca youth players who were expected to excel in the Premier League in the future. After joining Wigan, coach Roberto Martinez said of the player, "He is only a boy...it is going to be two or three years before he has adapted to the physical side of the game...but he has great ability. Tactically, the boy is a joy to watch" while adding in jest, "I don't know where he gets it from."

After Wigan were relegated from the Premier League following the 2012–13 Premier League season, Angoy-Cruyff left the club and signed a one-year contract with the reserve team of FC Lausanne-Sport of the Swiss Super League, despite an offer to stay with Wigan as they competed in The Championship. In May 2013, before joining Lausanne in July, the player was taken on trial by D.C. United of Major League Soccer but was ultimately not signed. In January 2014, Angoy-Cruyff went on an unsuccessful trial with FK AS Trenčín of the Corgoň Liga, the top football league in Slovakia after leaving Lausanne.

=== Senior ===
On 16 April 2014, it was announced that Angoy-Cruyff signed for the Dayton Dutch Lions of the USL Pro, the third division of the United States soccer pyramid, on a three-year contract. He made his debut for the club on 19 April 2014 against the Harrisburg City Islanders, coming on as a 70th-minute substitute for Eli Garner.

He returned to Spain in summer 2015 to join Reus, who sent him on loan to satellite club Morell. Following his departure, he played the 2017–18 season in Sitges with Suburense in Segona Catalana.
