= Dayton Outpatient Center Stadium =

Soccer stadium in West Carrollton, Ohio

- DOC Stadium
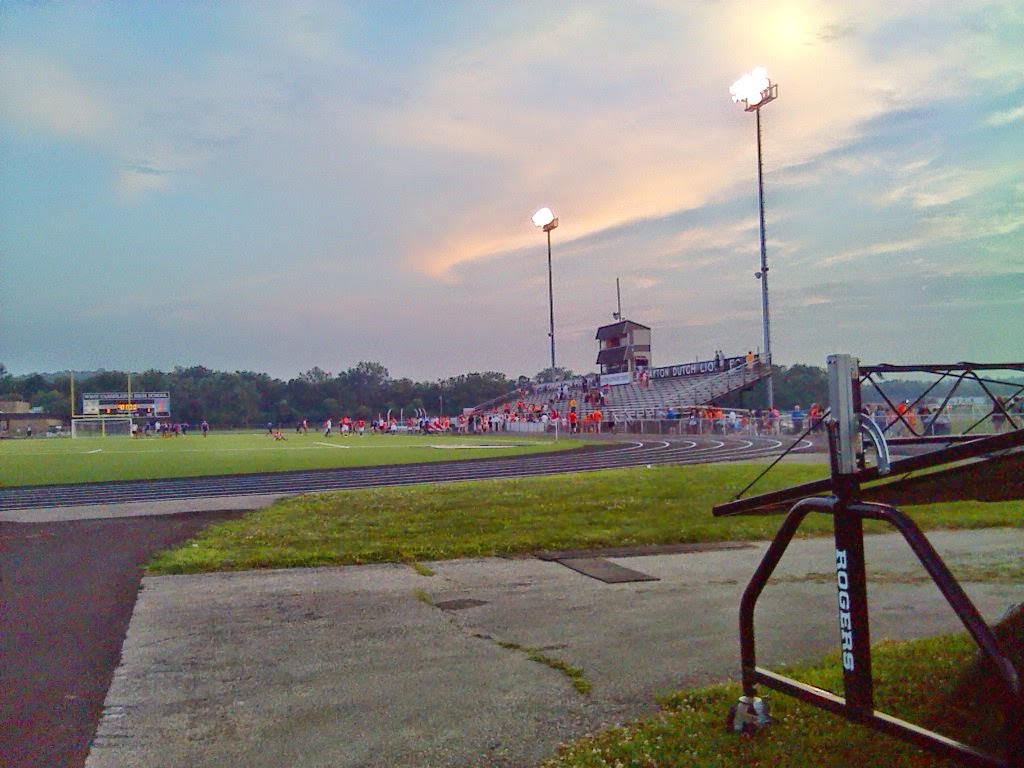
- View of the main grandstand
- Interactive map of Dayton Outpatient Center Stadium
- Former names: West Carrollton High School Stadium
- Location: 5833 Student Street; West Carrollton, Ohio, 45449
- Coordinates: 39.6705099°N 84.2306667°W
- Capacity: 3,500
- Surface: Artificial Turf
- Field size: 348 by 197 feet (106 m × 60 m)

Construction
- Renovated: 2017
- Cost: $475,000
- Main contractor: The Motz Group

Tenants
- Dayton Dutch Lions (USL2) (2014–present) West Carrollton Pirates Soccer & Football

Dayton Outpatient Center Stadium (DOC Stadium) is a 3,500 seat artificial turf stadium located in West Carrollton, Ohio, on the campus of West Carrollton High School.

The Dayton Dutch Lions partnered with West Carrollton City Schools and Dr. Suresh Gupta of the Dayton Outpatient Center to install a new playing surface in the West Carrollton High School Stadium as part of a 30-year deal. The original stadium was renamed to the Dayton Outpatient Center Stadium in recognition of the significant investment made by Dayton Outpatient Center.

Renovations started on March 10, 2014, and were completed with a ribbon-cutting ceremony on May 9, 2014. The Motz Group, a Cincinnati-based company that specializes in building playing fields, replaced the existing grass field with artificial turf at a cost of $450,000 to $475,000. The combined costs for the renovations to the stadium and installation of lights on practice fields are estimated at $529,000.

DOC Stadium was officially opened on May 10, 2014, with a United Soccer League soccer game that saw the Dayton Dutch Lions tie the LA Galaxy II, 1–1 with a record attendance of 1,527.
