= Glenn van Geldorp =

Dutch footballer

Glenn van Geldorp (born 20 March 1992) is a Dutch professional football player currently active for Dayton Dutch Lions in the USL/PDL. Glenn started his professional career as a Futsal player for Pattaya Arena Futsal Club in the Thai Premier League. After playing for De S'81 Under 19's in the Dutch Eredivisie he found his luck abroad in Thailand. Glenn used to be a football player all his life until he officially switched to be a futsal Professional in 2013. In 2015 Pattaya Arena Futsal club went bankrupt and Glenn switched from futsal back to football starting off at Pattaya City FC in the Thai Division 2. In 2017 Glenn went to the United States of America to sign and play for Dayton Dutch Lions where he is currently active in the USL/PDL captaining the team.

He used to play for and have trials with different professional Football clubs in The Netherlands and even abroad as a youth player. Clubs as: AFC Ajax FC Den Bosch HFC Haarlem Stormvogels/Telstar AZ Alkmaar Willem 2 Pattaya United Sriracha FC Almere City FC
