= Nikolaos Pettas (footballer) =

Greek footballer

Personal information
- Full name: Nikolaos Spiridon Pettas
- Date of birth: January 2, 1994 (age 32)
- Place of birth: Zakynthos, Greece
- Height: 1.75 m (5 ft 9 in)
- Position: Defender

Senior career*
Years	Team	Apps	(Gls)
2012–2016	Zakynthos	55	(0)
2012	→ Asteras Magoula (loan)	3	(0)
2013	→ Panachaiki (loan)	0	(0)
2017	Almeyda FC		
2018	Houston Dutch Lions	5	(0)
2019	Atlanta SC	3	(0)
2020	Chattanooga Red Wolves	2	(0)
- * Club domestic league appearances and goals as of 25 October 2020

Nikolaos Spiridon Pettas (born 2 January 1994) is a Greek footballer who last played for Chattanooga Red Wolves SC.
