= Hans van Arum =

Dutch footballer and coach

Personal information
- Date of birth: 23 December 1966 (age 59)
- Place of birth: Amersfoort, Netherlands
- Position: Striker

Youth career
- SDV Barneveld

Senior career*
Years	Team	Apps	(Gls)
1989-1992	Vitesse	104	(29)
1993–1994	Willem II	14	(59)
1995–1999	RKC	120	(20)
2000–2002	Go Ahead Eagles	50	(26)
Total		333	(89)

Managerial career
- 2010: Vitesse (caretaker)
- 2011-2012: AGOVV
- 2012–2013: Dutch Lions
- 2013–2017: SDV Barneveld
- 2017–2018: VVOG
- 2018: Eemdijk
- * Club domestic league appearances and goals

Hans van Arum (born 23 December 1966) is a Dutch football coach and former professional player, appearing as a striker in over 200 games in the Eredivisie with Vitesse, Willem II and RKC Waalwijk.

Van Arum was head coach for AGOVV Apeldoorn in the Dutch Jupiler League, the interim head coach for SBV Vitesse in the Dutch Eredivisie, and head coach for the Houston Dutch Lions FC in the 2013 PDL season. In 2013 he coached SDV Barneveld in the Hoofdklasse.
