= Florida Gulf Coast Dutch Lions =

Florida Gulf Coast Dutch Lions FC
- Full name: Florida Gulf Coast Dutch Lions FC
- Nickname(s): Dutch Lions
- Founded: April 2015
- Owner: Dutch Lions consulting group Mike Mossel
- Website: http://fgcdlfc.com
| Home Jersey colours | Trainings Jersey colours |

Florida Gulf Coast Dutch Lions FC is an American soccer team based in Cape Coral, Florida, United States.

The club was founded in April 2015. In the season of 2018 the club grew to 140 Youth Academy members, 25 Lion Cubs members and a Women's Team .

Since the start of the club, the Youth Academy have 3 teams in top 50 of the State and every team is in the top 100 of the state. From the U8 to the U16G, every single team won a tournament once a season.

In February 2017 the U10B won the Bazooka President's Day Tournament in Winter Haven with a 5–4 victory in the final.

In February 2017 Florida Gulf Coast Dutch Lions FC took over the WPSL license from Palm City and became the 1st club in Lee County with a WPSL license. The club has a collaboration with ADO Den Haag from The Netherlands.

In January 2018 the U14G won the I-75 Shootout in Fort Myers by winning all 4 games. Besides that the U12G became the first Florida Gulf Coast Dutch Lions FC Youth Team in May 2018 that entered the top-20 of the State.

In July 2018 the Women's Team became Champion of the WPSL Sunshine Conference with 16 points. This meant the first play-off bound for the club.

== History ==
The team is supported by Dutch Eredivisie side FC Twente, and is co-owned by Erik Tammer of Tammer Sportmanagement and Mike Mossel of Business and Sports Performance. Tammer is a former professional soccer player in the Netherlands who played for clubs such as sc Heerenveen and Sparta Rotterdam, while Mossel played in Europe for RBC Roosendaal and Turnhout, and in the USL for the Cincinnati Riverhawks following his graduation from Xavier University.

In the summer of 2015 the Super 20 team played in the United Soccer Leagues' Super-20 League.

In the summer of 2016 the men's team played several friendly games in Florida.

Since the summer of 2017 the Florida Gulf Coast Dutch Lions FC has a professional Women's Team.

The Dutch Lions FC consists of five franchises in the USA: Dayton Dutch Lions FC, Houston Dutch Lions FC, Cincinnati Dutch Lions FC, New York City Dutch Lions FC, and Florida Gulf Coast Dutch Lions FC.

== Colors and badge ==
Florida Gulf Coast Dutch Lions FC crest is a modified version of Dayton Dutch Lions' logo, featuring the white and blue field, with an orange lion centered on the crest. The script above the vector lion reads the club's name.

== Training ground ==
Jim Jeffers Park, Cape Coral, Florida, United States

== Women's team ==
Florida Gulf Coast Dutch Lions FC will play during the summer in Sunshine Division of WPSL, second level of competitive soccer in USA. They will play their games at North Fort Myers Community Park in North Fort Myers.

On February 10 Florida Gulf Coast Dutch Lions FC signed their first player: Keely Cecil.

The Women's team won their home-opener in front of 580 spectators with 2–1. At the end of the season the Women's Team had a 4-1-4 record. Monique Elliot went on a trial with partner club ADO Den Haag in December and made a great impression there.

Season 2018 started with a 2–0 victory over Florida Tropics in the Kick for Cancer weekend. We raised over $800 that weekend. The regular season ended with a 5-1-1 and championship in Miami. In the weekend of July 14 the team went to Tennessee for the WPSL South Region Play-offs.

== Staff ==
| Position | Name |
|---|---|
| Director of Soccer Operations | (Netherlands) Vincent de Weger |
| Academy Director | (Netherlands) Davy Hendrks |
| Youth Coach | (United States) Chris Vianest |
| Youth Coach | (United States) John Teeter |
| Youth Coach | (United States) Hannah DePaola |
| Youth Coach | (United States) Katrina Tracy |
| Youth Coach | (England) Sarah Feakins |
| Youth Coach | (England) Steve Feakins |
| Youth Coach | (United States) Chrysten Foley |
| Physical Therapist | (United States) Matthew Harkness |
| Fitness Coach | (Austria) Tina Kaiser |

== See also ==
- Cincinnati Dutch Lions
- Dayton Dutch Lions
- Miami Dutch Lions
