= Alejandro García (soccer, born 1994) =

American soccer player

Personal information
- Full name: Alejandro Camilo Garcia
- Date of birth: March 30, 1994 (age 32)
- Place of birth: Bakersfield, California, United States
- Height: 5 ft 10 in (1.78 m)
- Position: Attacking midfielder

College career
| Years | Team | Apps | (Gls) |
| 2012–2013 | Darton State Cavaliers | 34 | (28) |
| 2014–2015 | Cincinnati Bearcats | 37 | (12) |

Senior career*
| Years | Team | Apps | (Gls) |
| 2015 | Cincinnati Dutch Lions | 12 | (5) |
| 2016 | Orlando City B | 7 | (0) |
| 2020 | Los Angeles Force | 2 | (0) |
- * Club domestic league appearances and goals as of April 10, 2021

Alejandro Camilo Garcia (born March 30, 1994) is an American soccer player who plays as a midfielder.

== Career ==
=== College and amateur ===
After two years of college soccer at Darton State College, García transferred to the University of Cincinnati, where he tallied twelve goals in 37 appearances for the Bearcats.

García also appeared for Premier Development League side Cincinnati Dutch Lions in 2015.

=== Professional ===
García signed with United Soccer League side Orlando City B on March 11, 2016.
