= List of potato chip brands =

This is a list of potato chip brands organised by continent.

== North America ==
In the United States, potato chips are made by national chains like Frito-Lay, Pringles and Kettle Brand; major regional brands like Jay's of Chicago, Better Made of Detroit, Mikesells of Dayton, Old Dutch of Minneapolis, and Utz of Hanover, Pennsylvania; and specialty brands with local or uneven distribution. Potato chip flavorings include variations of barbecue, as well as sour cream and onion, sour cream and cheddar, salt and vinegar, ranch, jalapeño and cheese. In the Gulf South, Zapp's of Gramercy, Louisiana, makes kettle-cooked chips using regional flavors such as Crawtator, Cajun dill, Voodoo, and Creole onion. Pennsylvania leads the United States in potato chip production, and has been dubbed "the Potato Chip Capital" by several sources. Pennsylvania-based companies that produce potato chips include Utz Quality Foods, Herr's, Snyder of Berlin, Snyder's of Hanover, Martin's Potato Chips, Wise Foods and Charles Chips.

In Canada, seasonings include the unique all-dressed, as well as dill pickle, jalapeño, ketchup, barbecue, sour cream and onion, and salt and vinegar. In 2006, Lay's introduced wasabi chips in Toronto and Vancouver, but no longer offers them. Lays has recently released new Lay's Poppables which come in three flavours: Sea Salt and Vinegar, Honey BBQ, Sea Salt and White cheddar. Loblaw, Canada's largest food retailer, offers several unusual flavors under its President's Choice brand, including poutine, maple bacon, Jamaican jerk chicken, Greek feta and olive, ballpark hot dog, and barbecue baby back ribs.

== South America ==
In Colombia, lemon, chicken, chorizo, and sirloin steak with mushroom sauce flavored potato chips are sold.

== United Kingdom ==
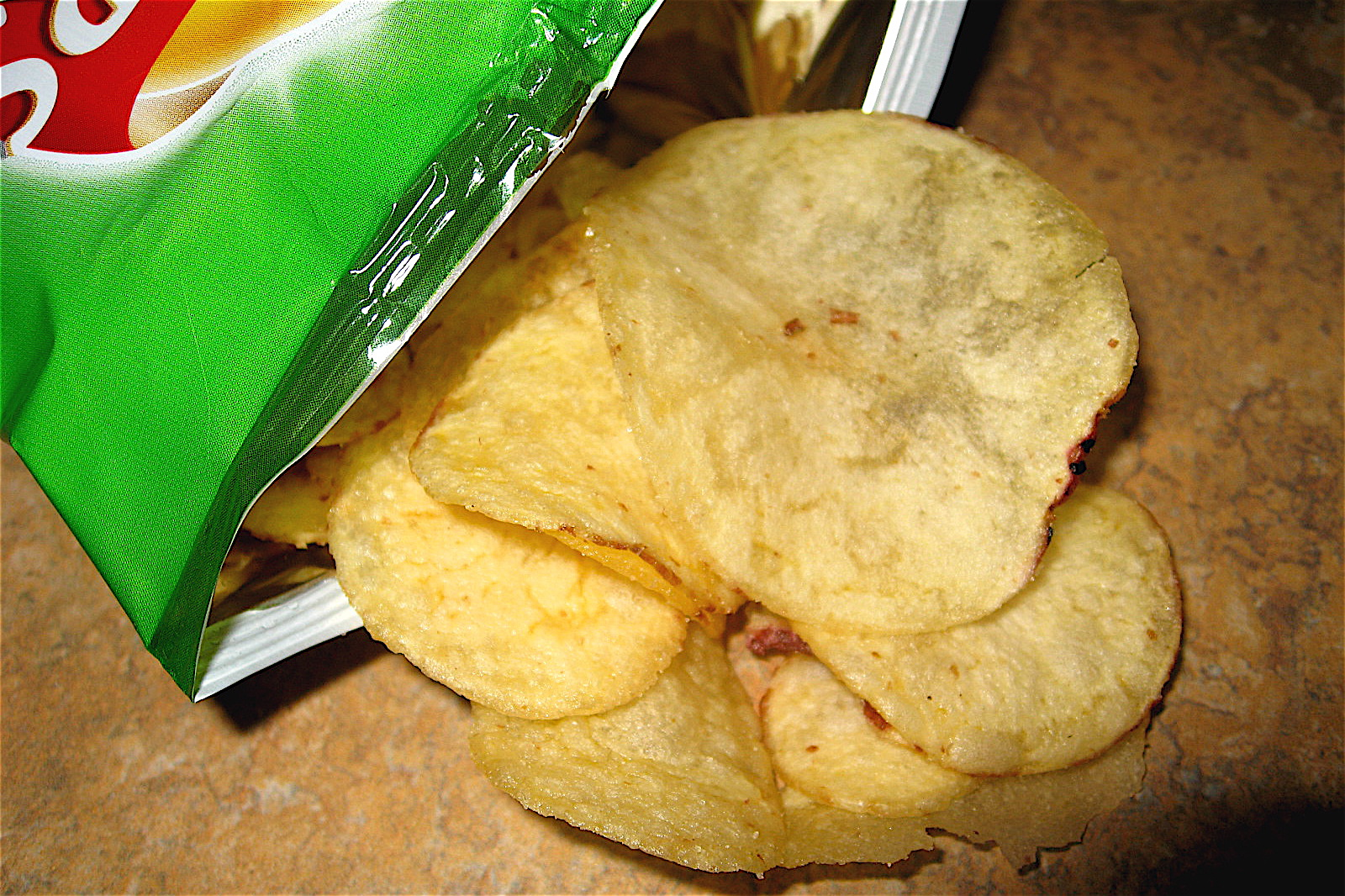
Walkers salt and vinegar

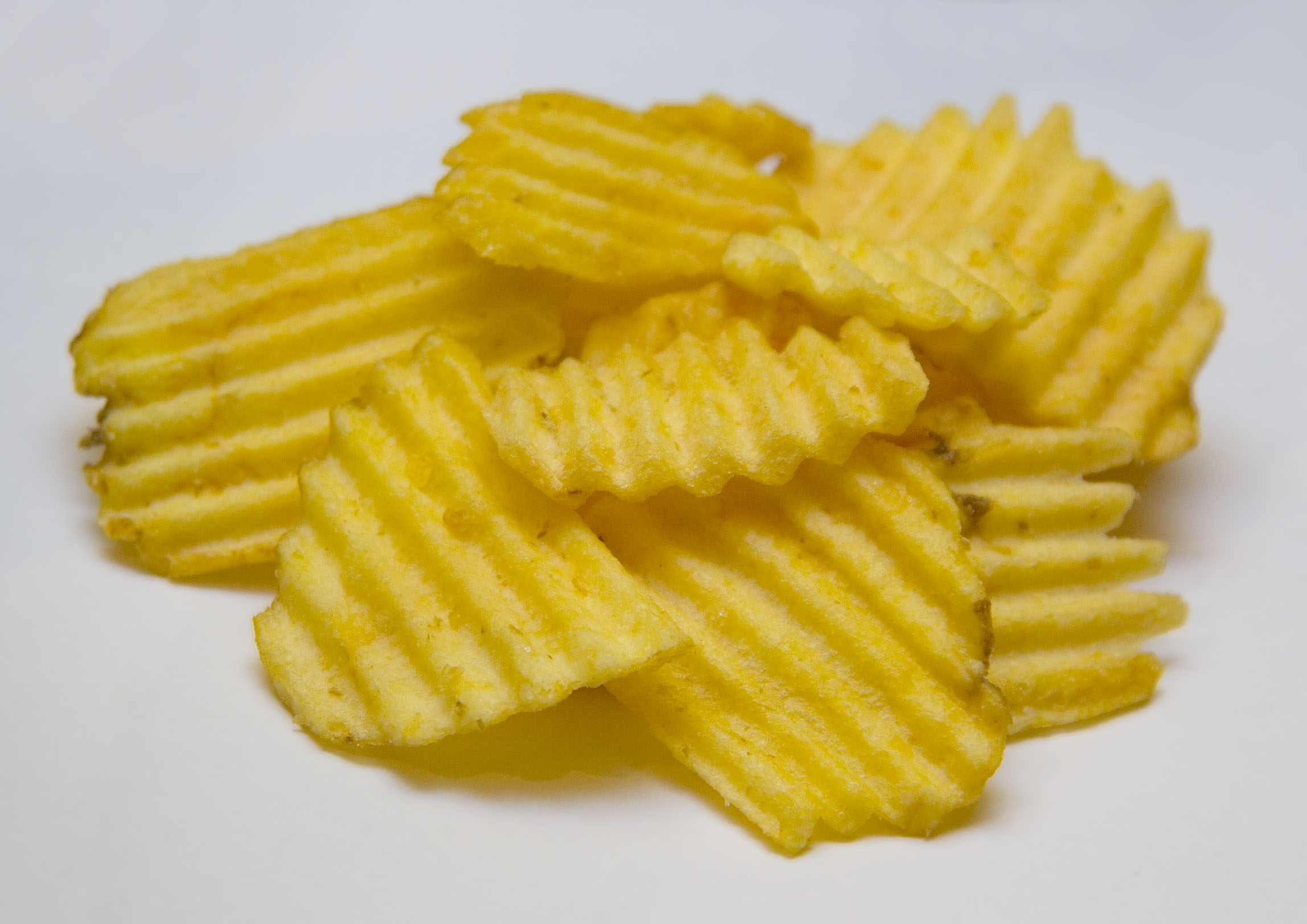
McCoy's crinkle-cut crisps

The market in the United Kingdom is led by Walkers, which held 56% of the British crisp market in 2013. Walkers is known for its wide variety of crisps with the most popular flavors being Cheese & Onion, Salt & Vinegar, Prawn Cocktail, Beef and Onion, Roast Chicken, Smoky Bacon, Worcester Sauce, Pickled Onion, Tomato Ketchup, and Salt & Shake / Original. More exotic flavors are Thai sweet chili, roast pork and creamy mustard sauce, lime and Thai spices, chicken with Italian herbs, Spicy Sriracha, BBQ Pulled Pork, sea salt and cracked black pepper, sea salt and cider vinegar, spicy and aromatic curry, turkey and bacon, caramelized onion and sweet balsamic vinegar, Stilton and cranberry. Since 2008, Walkers has launched its "Do Us a Flavour" campaign, challenging the British public to think up unique flavors for their crisps. Six flavors were chosen from among the entries and released as special editions. In 2014 the public had to pick one of Walkers' base ingredients, which was made up of six flavors from around the UK—Somerset Cheddar, Devonshire Chicken, Norfolk Pork, Dorset Sour Cream, Vale of Evesham Tomatoes and Aberdeen Angus Beef—then add their own unique flavor. In 2018 Walkers launched six new flavors to celebrate the brand's 70th birthday, with each flavor representing a different decade.

In 1981, hedgehog flavoured crisps were produced by the landlord of The Vaults in Welshpool, Philip Lewis, for his customers who kept asking for them as a joke. They became unexpectedly popular, but this led to controversy. There was concern that real hedgehogs were being slaughtered, but it proved that they were actually flavored with pork fat. This then caused concern about false advertising, and so a compromise was agreed with the trading standards authorities: the labelling was amended to "Hedgehog® Flavoured Crisps".

== Europe ==
In Germany, Belgium and the Netherlands only two flavors were traditionally available, red paprika (Paprika, sometimes also called ungarisch (from "Hungarian")) and salted (gesalzen). These are still by far the most common and popular types, but some vendors have started to offer a number of other flavors such as sour cream and onion, cheese, oriental, or more exotic seasonings like "Chakalaka", "Currywurst", "Pommes" (french fries), "Rot-weiss" (red and white: french fries with tomato ketchup and mayonnaise). In Germany, potato chips made from ground potatoes are called Stapelchips rather than Kartoffelchips for legal reasons, according to the definitions in the Lebensmittelbuch (Codex Alimentarius).

In Ireland, the two most popular flavors are cheese and onion, and salt and vinegar. In Ireland the word "Tayto" is synonymous with potato chips after the Tayto brand and can be used to describe all varieties of chips, including those not produced by Tayto. Hunky Dorys and King are other popular Irish brands. In November 2010, the Tayto company opened a theme park called "Tayto Park".

In chain stores of Moscow, one can normally find four of aforementioned European flavors (such as paprika, just salt, cheese, and sour onion with greens) and such meat related flavors as bacon, chicken, grilled meat and such. Russkaya Kartoshka brand of chips, which boasts reduced content of oil in their curled (C-shaped, nearly ball-shaped) chips, offers various flavors; with "grilled salmon", "shrimp" and "Kamchatka's crab" being unique seafood-themed flavors of potato chips, mass-produced in Russia. Lay's offers crab-flavored and no-cream green onion flavored chips as ones made uniquely for Russian market (see bottom-right corner of "About" page of Lays.ru). Lay's "Iz pechi" (literally "from the stove") line of less-oiled chips also include crab flavor. In 2013, Lay's held a contest on "people's choice" between two flavours: lecho flavour and buttered potato with dill; with the latter winning in the contest; however, the buttered potato flavor was discontinued on the next year. "Just Brutal" brand has pitch-black chips (similar to American "Rainbow" chips mentioned above), sold in "Fix Price" chain stores, the flavors are "vinegar" and "Thai sweet pepper".

== Asia ==
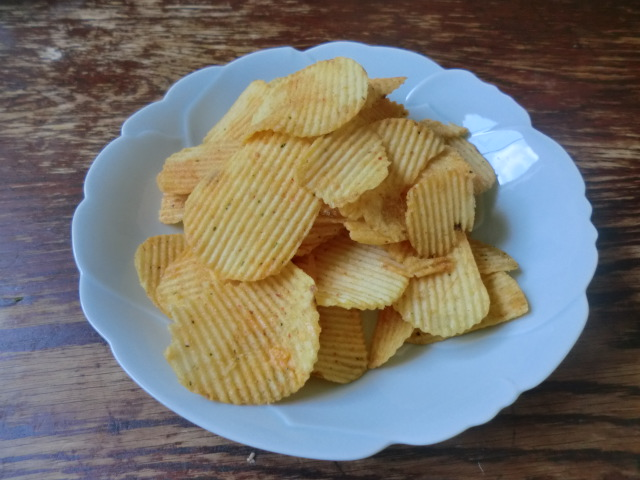
Bowl of pizza-flavored chips in Japan

In Japan, flavors include norishio (nori and salt), consommé, wasabi, soy sauce and butter, garlic, plum, barbecue, pizza, mayonnaise, and black pepper. Chili, scallop with butter, teriyaki, takoyaki, and yakitori chip flavors are also available. Major manufacturers include Calbee, and Koikeya.

In Indonesia, potato chips are commonly called kripik kentang and traditionally fell under the kripik category. The Indonesian potato chips market is mainly ruled by two brands: Indofood's Chitato (since 1990s) and Lay's (Frito-Lay). In 2014, Japan's Calbee and Indonesia's Wings Food formed Calbeewings, a joint venture and marketed Potabee potato chips in Indonesia. Common potato chips flavors marketed in Indonesia include beef barbecue, spicy chicken, cheese and plain salted. Lay's potato chips sold in Indonesia are available in six flavors: honey butter, sour cream and onion, nori seaweed, beef barbecue, classic salty, and salmon teriyaki flavors. Potabee sold in Indonesia offers two flavors: beef BBQ and grilled seaweed. In 2018 Chitato launched a "Do Us a Flavor" campaign that sells three unusual flavors: beef rendang, fried crab golden egg yolk, and mango sticky rice.

In Hong Kong, the two prominent potato chips are the spicy "Ethnican" variety by Calbee, and barbecue by Jack 'n Jill.

== See also ==
- Lists of brands
- List of deep fried foods
- List of potato dishes
