= Daniel Fischer (footballer) =

Danish footballer

Personal information
- Date of birth: 22 July 1997 (age 29)
- Place of birth: Hainburg an der Donau, Austria
- Height: 1.85 m (6 ft 1 in)
- Position: Defender

Team information
- Current team: SC Neusiedl am See
- Number: 5

Youth career
- 2004–2010: ASK-BSC Bruck/Leitha
- 2010–2014: AKA St. Pölten
- 2014–2017: SKN St. Pölten

College career
| Years | Team | Apps | (Gls) |
| 2017–2019 | Young Harris Mountain Lions | 54 | (7) |

Senior career*
| Years | Team | Apps | (Gls) |
| 2014–2017 | SKN St. Pölten II | 33 | (0) |
| 2019 | Cincinnati Dutch Lions | 3 | (0) |
| 2019–2020 | Saint Louis FC | 7 | (0) |
| 2021–2022 | ASK-BSC Bruck/Leitha | 35 | (1) |
| 2023–2024 | SV Leobendorf | 39 | (1) |
| 2024– | SC Neusiedl am See | 11 | (0) |
- * Club domestic league appearances and goals as of 28 December 2024

Daniel Fischer (born 22 July 1997) is an Austrian footballer who plays as a defender for SC Neusiedl am See.

== Career ==
=== Youth, College & Amateur ===
Fischer spent time with academy teams in Austria, also appearing for the SKN St. Pölten second team in the Austrian Regionalliga.

Following his release from St. Pölten, Fischer went to the United States to play college soccer at Young Harris College. At Young Harris, Fischer played 54 games, scoring 7 goals and tallying 9 assists during three seasons. In his sophomore and junior years, Fischer earned various accolades, including; All-Peach Belt Conference first team (2018), D2CCA NCAA Division II All-Southeast Region first team (2018), All-Peach Belt Conference second team (2019) and the United Soccer Coaches NCAA Division II Men's Scholar All-America team (2019).

While at college, Fischer also played in the USL League Two with Cincinnati Dutch Lions, making three appearances for the club during their 2019 season.

=== Professional ===
On 18 December 2019, Fischer signed with USL Championship side Saint Louis FC ahead of their 2020 season. He made his debut on 26 July 2020, appearing as an injury-time substitute during a 1–0 win over Indy Eleven.
