= Better Made Potato Chips =

Snack chip brand

- Industry: Chips
- Founded: 1930; 96 years ago
- Headquarters: Detroit, Michigan, United States
- Products: Potato chips, corn chips, pork rinds, cheese curls, popcorn, pretzels, dips
- Parent: Better Made Snack Foods, Inc.
- Website: bettermade.com

Better Made Potato Chips is a Detroit-based snack brand founded in 1930 by Cross Moceri and Peter Cipriano. Still headquartered on Gratiot Avenue in eastern Detroit, the company has evolved from a two-man operation to a regional snack institution distributing products across Michigan and parts of surrounding states.

== History ==
In 1930, Sicilian immigrants Cross Moceri and Peter Cipriano purchased a small potato-chip operation in east Detroit and founded the Cross & Peters Company. They officially launched the “Better Made” brand in 1934.

By 1937, workers had unionized, increasing pay to 40 cents per hour and improving hours and working conditions.

After World War II, the company moved into a 25,000-square-foot plant on Gratiot Avenue in 1955.

In 1970, when New Era brand was discontinued by Frito Lay, Better Made bought the recipes, equipment and opened a new line.

In 1973, Better Made introduced its first flavored chips—barbecue—followed by sour cream & onion around 1974.

In 1994, the company merged with Bay City’s Made‑Rite Chip Company, adding three production lines and over 50 new delivery routes.

After the founders’ deaths in the 1980s, ownership passed to their heirs. In 2003, the Moceri family's stake was bought out, and the company was renamed Better Made Snack Foods, Inc. The same year, sales reached $36 million.

== Products & Operations ==
Better Made primarily uses Michigan-grown potatoes (except during off-season) and fries its chips in 100% cottonseed oil. It produces over 60 million pounds of potato chips annually.

The product line includes:

- Potato chips (plain, BBQ, sour cream & onion, Red Hot, salt & vinegar, and more)
- Corn chips, cheese curls, cheese puffs, pork rinds, popcorn
- Pretzels, dips, and seasonal flavors like ketchup and sweet BBQ

== Cultural significance ==
Better Made is the last remaining Detroit-based chip brand to originate from a local snack market. Its signature yellow-and-red bags are seen as Detroit icons. (Note: It is the lone survivor from the more than 20 (22 to 31 per various sources) potato chip companies that once operated in Detroit, Michigan. Among the companies were: Best Made (Founded in 1929 as Best Made, became New Era, Better Made's chief competitor before merging with Frito in 1958 and later becoming part of Lay's'); Better Made (The only manufacturer still operating in Detroit today); Charles Chips (Originally from Pennsylvania/Maryland, this brand had a massive presence in Detroit through its iconic home-delivery tin service); Downeys Potato Chips (While associated with the region, it is based in Waterford, Michigan); Everkrisp Potato Chip Co. (A well-known local brand from the mid-20th century); Everlast; Famous Foods Inc. (Produced various snack lines, including chips, in Detroit); Heintz; Jane Parker; Keuhmanns; Krun-chee (A major local brand that operated for decades until closing in 1974); Mack’s; Mello Krisp (or Mello Crisp)(A frequent staple in Detroit households during the city's "crunch capital" era); Made-Rite Chip Company (Based in Bay City, Michigan, it merged with Better Made in 1994 to expand production capacity); New Era Potato Chips (Founded in 1929 as Best Maid, it became Better Made's chief competitor before merging with Frito in 1958 and later becoming part of Lay's.); Nicks Potato Chips; Paramount Potato Chips; Paradise Potato Chip Co (One of the dozens of small, often family-run operations); Ray’s Potato Chips (Often associated with Uncle Ray's); Superior Potato Chips: (A former major local player); its old factory site was later used by Uncle Ray's.; Twin Pines (Known primarily as a dairy, and sponsor of "Milky the Clown" show, they also produced a line of potato chips); Vita-Boy (Another long-standing historical brand remembered by longtime residents); Wolverine Potato Chips (One of the prominent early-century manufacturers); and Yankee Potato Chip.)

In 2015, author Karen Dybis published Better Made in Michigan, a history of the brand with rare family photos and insider interviews.

It is part of Detroit's culture, like Detroit-style pizza and Detroit-style Coney Island hot dogs.

Better Made's factory was featured in the series finale of the Comedy Central show Detroiters, using both exterior and interior shots.

It has survived for almost a century in the face of intense competition from larger national corporate power house producers of snack foods, such as Lay's, Pringles or Ruffles. Its secrets are innovation in changing markets, and a dedication to core values, featuring local potatoes. (Note: For ten months per year and "drawing from Mother Nature's harvest schedule in Florida, Missouri, Indiana, North Dakota, Minnesota, or wherever" the best potatoes are available and quality.)

== See also ==
- List of potato chip brands
