= Matheus Diovany =

Brazilian footballer

Personal information
- Full name: Matheus Diovany Pechim dos Santos
- Date of birth: February 10, 1994 (age 32)
- Place of birth: Curitiba, Paraná, Brazil
- Height: 6 ft 0 in (1.83 m)
- Position: Defender

Team information
- Current team: Campo Mourão

Youth career
- ADAP
- Coritiba

Senior career*
Years	Team	Apps	(Gls)
2012–2013	VVV-Venlo	0	(0)
2014	Dayton Dutch Lions	9	(0)
2015	Piauí		
2016	Campo Mourão		
- * Club domestic league appearances and goals as of October 26, 2016

Matheus Diovany Pechim dos Santos (born February 10, 1994) is a Brazilian footballer who plays as a defender for Sport Club Campo Mourão.

== Career ==
Matheus Diovany spent time with Coritiba FC's youth team before signing with Dutch club VVV Venlo in 2012. After one season with the Dutch club, Matheus Diovany signed with USL Pro club Dayton Dutch Lions in March 2014.
