= West Carrollton High School =

Location
- 5833 Student Street; West Carrollton, Ohio 45449; United States; 39.672003°N 84.230774°W

Information
- Type: Public
- School district: West Carrollton City School District
- Principal: David White
- Teaching staff: 60.80 (FTE)
- Grades: 9–12
- Enrollment: 915 (2017-18)
- Student to teacher ratio: 15.05
- Colors: Scarlet & Black
- Fight song: WCHS Fight Song
- Athletics conference: Miami Valley League
- Mascot: Pirate Pete
- Team name: Pirates
- Rival: Miamisburg High School
- Accreditation: Ohio Department of Education
- Newspaper: The Hook
- Website: www.westcarrolltonschools.com/o/wchs

West Carrollton High School is a public high school in West Carrollton, Ohio, United States. It is the only high school in the West Carrollton City School District. Athletic teams are known as the "Pirates" and the school colors are scarlet and black. As of the 2013–14 school year, the school has an enrollment of approximately 900 students.

West Carrollton has been rated as "Effective" since 2002 by the Ohio Department of Education. The school met nine of the 12 state indicators for the 2005–2006 school year.

== Sports ==
West Carrollton has won the Harold A. Meyer award for exceptional sportsmanship six different times since 2000. WCHS is home to the West Carrollton Marching Pirates. The marching band has won numerous awards throughout the Mid-States Band Association circuit. The band was MSBA class AA finalists in 2013 and 2014.

As of 2019-20 the Pirates are Members of the Miami Valley League (MVL).

=== Dayton Outpatient Center Stadium ===
Dayton Outpatient Center Stadium (DOC Stadium) is the home of West Carrollton High School Athletics and the Dayton Dutch Lions FC. The stadium seats around 3,000 spectators.

== Notable alumni ==
- Christine Jones Forman — senior astrophysicist at the Harvard-Smithsonian Center for Astrophysics
- Ty Harris — professional basketball player
- Alice Ripley — actor, singer, songwriter, and mixed media artist
- Scott James Wells — actor and model
