= Guilherme Félix =

Brazilian footballer (born 1990)

Personal information
- Full name: Guilherme Ribeiro Félix
- Date of birth: April 8, 1990 (age 36)
- Place of birth: Uberaba, Brazil
- Height: 6 ft 1 in (1.85 m)
- Position: Forward

Team information
- Current team: Dayton Dutch Lions
- Number: 20

Senior career*
Years	Team	Apps	(Gls)
2008–2010	Cortiba		
2010	Trieste FC		
2011	Goiás		
2012	Atlético Mogi		
2013	Metalurh Zaporizhzhia		
2014–	Dayton Dutch Lions	17	(0)
- * Club domestic league appearances and goals as of September 12, 2014

Guilherme Ribeiro Félix (born April 8, 1990) is a Brazilian footballer, currently playing for Dayton Dutch Lions in the USL Professional Division.

== Career ==
His career includes time with Brazilian sides Trieste FC, Goiás, and Atlético Mogi. He also had a stint with Metalurh Zaporizhzhia in Ukraine, but is best known for his time at Cortiba in Brazil, where he played from 2008 to 2010.
