= Mikesell's =

Potato Chip Company

Coordinates: 39°47′2.27″N 84°11′32.86″W

Mikesell's Potato Chip
- Type: Private
- Industry: Snack food
- Founded: 1910; 116 years ago
- Headquarters: Dayton, Ohio, US
- Owner: Conn's Potato Chips (brand, 2023-present)
- Number of employees: 290
- Website: mikesells.com

Mikesell's Potato Chip Company is a Dayton, Ohio-based producer of potato chips and other snack foods. It bills itself as the "oldest continuously operating potato chip company in the United States." In 2010, Mikesell's celebrated its 100th year as a potato chip brand. Mikesell's products are available in retail markets in Ohio, Indiana, Kentucky, and Illinois. They may also be ordered online from the company's website and shipped anywhere outside the company's retail area.

Mikesell's was founded by Daniel W. Mikesell in Dayton, Ohio, in 1910 as a producer of dried beef and sausage. However, the company soon began producing "Saratoga Chips." The "Mikesell's" name and logo were adopted in 1925.

Varieties of chips produced by the company include Original, Groovy (ridged), Old Fashioned, Himalayan Sea Salt and Vinegar, Reduced Fat, No Salt, Green Onion, Honey Barbecue, Barbecue, Zesty Barbecue, Mesquite Smoked Bacon, Cheddar & Sour Cream, and Good 'n Hot. Mikesell's makes other products, including hull-less "Puffcorn Delites." Puffcorn Delites are made in four flavors—original, cheese, movie theater butter, salted caramel, and newly Pepperoni Pizza. A local confectioner, Esther Price Candies, sells the chips coated in chocolate.

Mikesell's potato chips are often found in chicken dinners, pork dinners, and other meals benefiting local organizations.

An episode of Columbo, Season 9, Episode 6, "Murder in Malibu", had a bag of Mikesell's potato chips in the background of the breakfast diner scene. This episode was filmed in 1990, the 80th anniversary of Mikesell's. This was likely a promotional placement, as California was not in the distribution area of Mikesell's. Mikesell’s potato chips were also seen in a grocery store in an episode of The King of Queens, season 8, episode 10, "Raygin’ Bulls", wherein Doug Heffernan and Ray Barone were discussing sleepover plans while the wives were out of town.

On February 1, 2023, Mikesell's announced their planned closure and liquidation of assets, with the intention to sell the brand and IP rights to another manufacturer. No timetable was immediately available. The brand was purchased by Conn's Potato Chips on February 13 and production resumed on February 14.

== See also ==
- List of potato chip brands
