= Joel DeLass =

American soccer player (born 1986)

Personal information
- Full name: Joel DeLass
- Date of birth: September 20, 1986 (age 40)
- Place of birth: Spring Lake, Michigan, United States
- Height: 5 ft 11 in (1.80 m)
- Position: Midfielder

Team information
- Current team: Real Monarchs (assistant)

College career
Years	Team	Apps	(Gls)
2005–2008	Wheaton Thunder	66	(31)

Senior career*
Years	Team	Apps	(Gls)
2007	West Michigan Edge	13	(1)
2010	Charlotte Eagles	2	(0)
2011–2014	Dayton Dutch Lions	91	(8)

Managerial career
- 2019: Lansing Ignite (assistant)
- 2020: Union Omaha (assistant)
- 2021–: Real Monarchs (assistant)
- * Club domestic league appearances and goals as of September 12, 2014

Joel DeLass (born September 20, 1986, in Spring Lake, Michigan) is an American soccer coach and former player.

== Career ==
=== College and amateur ===
DeLass attended Western Michigan Christian High School, who he helped lead to State and League Championships, and where he was a First Team All-State, All-Region, All-District, All-Area and All-Conference selection in 2003 and 2004

He subsequently played four years of college soccer at Wheaton College. He was an All-CCIW Second Team selection as a sophomore in 2006 and as a junior in 2007, and was his team's captain in his senior year, leading them in scoring, while being named CCIW Player of the Year and earning a spot on the NSCAA Division III All-America First Team and Central Region First Team.

During his college years DeLass also played in the USL Premier Development League with West Michigan Edge.

=== Professional ===
Undrafted out of college, DeLass turned professional in 2010 when signed with the Charlotte Eagles of the USL Second Division. He made his professional debut on April 17, 2010, in a game against Charleston Battery.

DeLass signed with Dayton Dutch Lions of the USL Pro league on March 29, 2011. He re-signed with the club in January 2012.

During the 2012 campaign, DeLass appeared in every match for the Dutch Lions, notching a league high 2,160 minutes in the regular season along with an additional 390 minutes in US Open Cup play. He contributed 1 goal and 1 assist in USLPRO action and scored what proved to be the match winner against the Michigan Bucks to send the Dutch Lions to the quarterfinals of the US Open Cup. The consistency and stability he provided in the midfield for the Dutch Lions saw his performance in the 2012 season earn him a spot on the 2012 USLPRO All League Second Team, despite the team's 4-10-10 record.

=== Coaching ===
In 2021, after stints as an assistant coach for USL League One sides Lansing Ignite and Union Omaha, DeLass joined the coaching staff of USL Championship side Real Monarchs.
