= Cincinnati Dutch Lions =

American amateur soccer club

Cincinnati Dutch Lions FC
- Full name: Cincinnati Dutch Lions Football Club
- Nickname: The Lions
- Founded: 2013; 13 years ago
- Stadium: Northern Kentucky University (NKU)
- Owners: Mike Mossel
- President: None
- Head Coach: None
- League: USL League Two
- 2019: 3rd, Great Lakes Division; Playoffs: DNQ
- Website: http://cdlfc.com/
Home colors	Away colors

The Cincinnati Dutch Lions FC is an American amateur soccer club based in Cincinnati, Ohio, and playing home games in the suburb of Highland Heights, Kentucky. Founded in 2013, the team played in USL League Two. The club went into hiatus during the 2020 COVID-19 pandemic.

The club was last owned by majority stakeholder Hans Philippo, who purchased the club alongside Club President Robert Rack in January 2017. This new ownership group includes Dr. Suresh Gupta and Mike Mossel, in representation of the Dutch Lions Capital Group, who remain minority owners in the club. Brandon Ponchak was the club's general manager after being hired in March 2017.

Their inaugural match at the Xavier University Soccer Complex on May 9, 2014 featured an appearance by soccer legend Ruud Gullit as he participated in a "Kick the Crossbar" contest and a pre-game ceremony.

The Cincinnati Dutch Lions were created and owned by Dutch Lions Capital Group BV, owners of the New York City Dutch Lions, Dayton Dutch Lions, Florida Gulf Coast Dutch Lions, and the Houston Dutch Lions.

CDLFC has found success in their short time including an appearance in the 2016 Lamar Hunt U.S. Open Cup. The ownership group of Philippo and Rack have made several changes for the club's 2017 season including purchasing a charter bus for the team, moving to the NKU Soccer Stadium as their home field and the creation of a new bar in support of the club.

In November 2019, CDLFC became the first club to join the brand new Ohio Valley Premier League which began play in 2020. Later in 2020 the CDLFC returned to the USL League Two.

== Seasons ==
Season	Record (W-L-D)	League	Regular season	Playoffs	Open Cup	Head Coach
2014	6-4-4	USL PDL	2nd, South Atlantic	did not qualify	did not qualify	Terry Nicholl
2015	8-5-1	USL PDL	2nd, South Atlantic	Divisional Playoff	did not qualify	Terry Nicholl
2016	1-10-3	USL PDL	7th, Great Lakes	did not qualify	1st Round	Terry Nicholl
2017	5-6-3	USL PDL	4th, Great Lakes	did not qualify	did not qualify	Sid van Druenen
2018	6-4-4	USL PDL	3rd, Great Lakes	did not qualify	did not qualify	Paul Nicholson
2019	6-3-5	USL League Two	3rd, Great Lakes	did not qualify	did not qualify	Paul Nicholson
2020	DNP^	USL League Two	N/A, Great Lakes	N/A	N/A	Paul Nicholson

The Premier Development League (USL PDL) rebranded to USL League Two (USL2) after the 2018 season.

^The 2020 season was cancelled due to the COVID-19 pandemic.

== Venue ==
- 2014: Xavier University
- 2015: Xavier University
- 2016: William Mason High School
- 2017: Northern Kentucky University
- 2018: Northern Kentucky University
- 2019: Northern Kentucky University
- 2020: Northern Kentucky University

== Kit ==
=== Kit manufacturers ===
- 2014: Nike
- 2015: Nike
- 2016: Patrick
- 2017: Under Armour
- 2018: Under Armour
- 2019: Under Armour
- 2020: Under Armour

=== Shirt sponsors ===
- 2014: N/A
- 2015: Holland Roofing
- 2016: Coca-Cola
- 2017: Mercedes-Benz of Fort Mitchell
- 2018: Mercedes-Benz of Fort Mitchell
- 2019: Mercedes-Benz of Fort Mitchell
- 2020: Mercedes-Benz of Fort Mitchell

== Head coaches ==
- (England) Terry Nicholl (2014–2016)
- (Netherlands) Sid van Druenen (2017)
- (England) Paul Nicholson (2018–2020)

== Notable former players ==
- (Netherlands) Yesin van der Pluijm signed in 2021 by Colorado Springs Switchbacks FC;
- (Zambia) Aimé Mabika 2021 MLS SuperDraft pick, 26th pick by Inter Miami CF
- (United States) Noah Lawrence 2021 MLS SuperDraft pick, 55th pick by Austin FC
- (United States) Brandon Clegg signed in 2020 by Detroit City FC
- (United States) Jimmy Filerman signed in 2020 by Detroit City FC; signed in 2021 by FC Tucson
- (United States) Connor Rutz signed in 2020 by Detroit City FC
- (United States) Azaad Liadi signed in 2020 by FC Tucson; signed in 2021 by South Georgia Tormenta FC
- (Zimbabwe) Tendai Jirira signed in 2020 by Detroit City FC
- (Netherlands) Wesley Storm signed in 2020 by ADO Den Haag
- (Sweden) Mark Lindstrӧm signed in 2020 by Pittsburgh Riverhounds
- (England) Arthur Rogers signed in 2019 by Hartford Athletic
- (Austria) Dani Fischer signed in 2019 by Saint Louis FC
- (United States) Geoffrey Dee signed in 2019 by Louisville City FC
- (United States) Adam Wilson 2019 MLS SuperDraft pick, 39th pick by Toronto FC
- (United States) Kevin Barajas signed in 2018 by Atlanta United 2
- (Curaçao) Zeus de la Paz signed in 2018 by Oldham Athletic AFC
- (United States) Jake Stovall 2017 MLS SuperDraft pick, 66th pick by Seattle Sounders FC. Played with Puerto Rico FC in 2017
- (United States) Garrett Halfhill signed in 2017 by FC Cincinnati
- (United States) Jalen Brown 2017 MLS SuperDraft pick, 38th pick by New York City FC. Played with Rochester Rhinos in 2017
- (Spain) Oriol Cortes signed in 2016 by Orange County SC
- (United States) Kyle Smith signed in 2016 by Louisville City FC; signed in 2018 by Orlando City SC
- (United States) Alejandro Garcia signed in 2016 by Orlando City SC
- (United States) Eric Osswald signed in 2015 by Real Monarchs SLC

== See also ==
- Dayton Dutch Lions
- Florida Gulf Coast Dutch Lions
- Miami Dutch Lions
