= Gibson Bardsley =

American soccer player (born 1989)

Personal information
- Full name: Gibson Theodore Bardsley
- Date of birth: July 23, 1989 (age 37)
- Place of birth: San Clemente, California, U.S.
- Height: 5 ft 11 in (1.80 m)
- Positions: Forward; attacking midfielder

Youth career
- Mount Si Wildcats

College career
Years	Team	Apps	(Gls)
2007–2010	Western Washington Vikings	74	(41)

Senior career*
Years	Team	Apps	(Gls)
2009	Abbotsford Mariners	12	(5)
2010	Washington Crossfire	5	(0)
2011	Charlotte Eagles	2	(0)
2012–2013	Dayton Dutch Lions	45	(14)
2014	Orange County Blues	7	(1)
2014	Kiruna FF	7	(5)
2015	Tulsa Roughnecks	17	(4)
2015	Pembroke Athleta	9	(1)
2016	Arizona United SC	9	(1)
2017	Kiruna FF	18	(13)
2018	Linköping City	3	(1)
2018	Kiruna FF	4	(2)
- * Club domestic league appearances and goals as of 19 June 2020

Gibson Bardsley (born July 23, 1989) is an American soccer player.

== Career ==
=== Youth and college ===
Bardsley was born in San Clemente, California and attended Mount Si High School, and played four years of college soccer at Western Washington University. Gibson "Giblits" Bardsley was named a first-team GNAC all-star as a sophomore in 2008, and was named to the Daktronics All-American first team and the Daktronics first team, was an NSCAA West Region All-Star, the Great Northwest Athletic Conference Player of the Year and a unanimous first-team all-league selection as senior in 2010. He finished his college career with 41 goals for the Vikings, tied for first in school history.

During his college years Bardsley also played for the Abbotsford Mariners and Washington Crossfire in the USL Premier Development League.

=== Professional ===
Bardsley turned professional in 2011 when he signed for USL Professional Division side Charlotte Eagles. He made his professional debut on April 29, in a game against Charleston Battery.

Bardsley moved to USL Professional Division club Dayton Dutch Lions in April 2012. He joined Orange County Blues FC for 2014. Bardsley played for Tulsa Roughneck FC in 2015 before being transferred to Pembroke Athleta FC of the Malta Premier Division. He signed with Arizona United SC on March 19, 2016.
