= Tyrone Hall =

American soccer player

Ty Hall
Personal information
- Full name: Tyrone Hall
- Date of birth: January 17, 1989 (age 37)
- Place of birth: Baltimore, Maryland, United States
- Height: 1.79 m (5 ft 10 in)
- Positions: Forward; midfielder; winger

Team information
- Current team: Harrisburg Heat
- Number: 20

Youth career
- 2005–2007: Bethesda United

College career
Years	Team	Apps	(Gls)
2008	Radford Highlanders		

Senior career*
Years	Team	Apps	(Gls)
2010	Sao Cristavao	0	(0)
2013	Pennsylvania Roar (indoor)	7	(1)
2014	Charlotte Eagles	14	(0)
2014	Ontario Fury (indoor)	6	(1)
2015	Sporting Kristina	9	(1)
2015–2016	Tacoma Stars (indoor)	13	(5)
2016–2017	Harrisburg Heat (indoor)	1	(1)
2017–2018	Florida Tropics SC (indoor)	20	(1)
2018–2020	Harrisburg Heat (indoor)	27	(7)
2021–2022	Tacoma Stars (indoor)	4	(0)
2022–	Harrisburg Heat (indoor)	8	(4)
- * Club domestic league appearances and goals as of July 26, 2022

Tyrone Hall (born January 17, 1989) is an American soccer player who plays for the Harrisburg Heat in the Major Arena Soccer League. He has also played abroad in South America and Finland, and has spent time playing both professional indoor and outdoor soccer in the United States.

== Career ==
=== Professional career ===
Hall signed with USL Pro club Charlotte Eagles on April 1, 2014. Prior to this, Hall had played with MISL club Pennsylvania Roar in 2013.

Hall rejoined the Harrisburg Heat on February 2, 2022.
