= Sid van Druenen =

Dutch football coach (born 1983)

Personal information
- Full name: Sid Maurice van Druenen
- Date of birth: 9 July 1983 (age 43)
- Place of birth: Venray, Netherlands

Youth career
- Years: Team
- 1994–2000: CD Boliqueime
- 2000–2001: EVV
- 2002–2005: CD Boliqueime

Managerial career
- 2009–2011: CDR Quarteirense
- 2012–2013: Dayton Dutch Lions FC Pro
- 2013–2016: Dayton Dutch Lions FC
- 2017: Cincinnati Dutch Lions
- 2018–2022: Wright State Raiders (assistant)
- 2021–: Dayton Dutch Lions FC
- 2022–: IU Indy

Sid Maurice van Druenen (born 9 July 1983) is a football coach and former semi-professional player.

== Playing career ==
Van Druenen was born in Venray. He played youth and semi-professional football in the Netherlands for EVV and in Portugal for CD Boliqueime.

== Managerial career ==
Van Druenen was a youth coach at Portuguese club CDR Quarteirense between 2006 and 2011. He was also involved as a fitness coach in several semi professional teams. In the summer of 2011 he moved to the USA to work for Soccer Centers in New Jersey.

In 2012, van Druenen was appointed manager of Dayton Dutch Lions W-League women's team, leading the team to a division championship. In November 2013 van Druenen became the youngest Head Coach in club and league history as he took over the reins of the Dayton Dutch Lions FC's professional team that competed in the USL PRO.

After taking the 2015 season off coaching, van Druenen returned to the Dayton Dutch Lions FC in 2016 as the Director of Soccer and Head Coach for the Men's team that competes in the PDL. With van Druenen at the helm the team just missed out on qualifying for the US Open Cup and registered one of its best PDL seasons in club history.

In January 2017, van Druenen left the Dayton Dutch Lions FC and was announced as the Technical Director and Head Coach for the Cincinnati Dutch Lions FC. Under van Druenen's, the Cincinnati Dutch Lions FC recording the best defensive record in club history, conceding only 16 goals in 14 games and a total of 6 clean sheets.

Van Druenen joined NCAA Division I Men's Soccer program, Wright State University, as a Volunteer Assistant Coach in August 2017. One year later van Druenen was announced as the main Assistant for the Wright State Raiders Men’s Soccer program.

In 2018, during his first season as assistant coach, van Druenen would help the Raiders to their best regular season record in program history (13-3-3) and claiming a regular season Horizon League championship. The same season would a Raider team ranked as high as No. 11 in the country by Top Drawer Soccer and see seven Raiders honored by the Horizon League.

In 2019, during his second season as the programs assistant coach, van Druenen helped continue on the success of his first season. A historic season that would see a trio of firsts: first Horizon League Championship, first NCAA Championship appearance and first NCAA Championship win (over Notre Dame) while advancing to the second round of the NCAA Championship, battling 13th-seeded Michigan through a scoreless 110 minutes before a final verdict was decided by penalty kicks. While also, helping record the sixth consecutive double-figure wins season (11-8-4). 2019 would also see multiple accolades from the Horizon League and Deri Corfe selected 41st overall with the 15th selection in the second round of the 2020 Major League Soccer Super Draft by the New York Red Bulls.

In 2020 there was no college season because of the COVID-19 pandemic.

In January 2021, in combination with his job at Wright State University, van Druenen returned to the Dayton Dutch Lions FC as the club’s Director of Soccer Operations and Men’s Head Coach.

On 10 February 2022 van Druenen was hired by IUPUI as Head Coach.
