= Jackson Beckham =

Brazilian footballer

Personal information
- Full name: Jackson Beckham Diego Socrates da Silva de Jesus
- Date of birth: December 6, 1994 (age 31)
- Place of birth: Brasilia, Brazil
- Height: 6 ft 0 in (1.83 m)
- Positions: Forward; attacking midfielder; winger

Youth career
- 2007–2010: Fiorentina

Senior career*
Years	Team	Apps	(Gls)
2010–2013	Fiorentina	0	(0)
2014	Dayton Dutch Lions	5	(0)
- * Club domestic league appearances and goals as of September 12, 2014

Jackson Beckham Diego Socrates da Silva de Jesus (born December 6, 1994) is a Brazilian footballer.

== Career ==
Jackson Beckham spent several years with Italian side ACF Fiorentina, where he was under a youth contract with the Serie A side from 2007 to 2010 before earning a professional contract for 2010–2013. He signed with third-tier American club Dayton Dutch Lions in March 2014.
