= Matt Walker (soccer) =

American soccer player

Personal information
- Full name: Matthew Thomas Walker
- Date of birth: September 16, 1992 (age 34)
- Place of birth: Cincinnati, Ohio, United States
- Height: 1.68 m (5 ft 6 in)
- Position: Midfielder

Youth career
- 2009–2010: Columbus Crew

College career
| Years | Team | Apps | (Gls) |
| 2010–2013 | Xavier Musketeers | | |

Senior career*
| Years | Team | Apps | (Gls) |
| 2013 | Michigan Bucks | 12 | (2) |
| 2014 | Columbus Crew | 0 | (0) |
| 2014 | → Dayton Dutch Lions (loan) | 23 | (2) |
| 2015–2017 | AFC Cleveland | | |
| 2018–2019 | Ankaran | | |
- * Club domestic league appearances and goals as of September 8, 2014

Matthew Thomas Walker (born September 16, 1992) is an American professional soccer player who plays as a midfielder.

== Career ==
=== Early career ===
Walker played four years of college soccer at Xavier University between 2010 and 2013. He also appeared for USL PDL side Michigan Bucks during their 2013 season.

=== Columbus Crew ===
Walker signed as a Homegrown Player with Columbus Crew on January 8, 2014. He was loaned out to their USL Pro affiliate Dayton Dutch Lions in March 2014.
