= Brock Granger =

American soccer player (born 1991)

Personal information
- Full name: Brock Granger
- Date of birth: March 10, 1991 (age 35)
- Place of birth: Honolulu, Hawaii, United States
- Height: 1.75 m (5 ft 9 in)
- Position: Defender

Youth career
- 1999–2009: Honolulu Bulls
- 2009: UNLV Rebels
- 2010–2012: Louisville Cardinals

Senior career*
Years	Team	Apps	(Gls)
2010	Portland Timbers U23s	14	(0)
2012	Portland Timbers U23s	1	(0)
2013–2014	Dayton Dutch Lions	53	(3)
2015–2017	Phoenix Rising FC	40	(0)
- * Club domestic league appearances and goals as of August 12, 2017

Brock Granger (born March 10, 1991) is an American soccer player.

== Career ==
=== College and amateur ===
Granger began his career at UNLV. In 2009, he made 18 appearances and helped the Rebels defense to five clean sheets. Following his freshman year at UNLV, Granger transferred to the University of Louisville along with teammate Nick DeLeon. In his first season with the Cardinals in 2010, he made 24 appearances and helped the defense register eight clean sheets. He also recorded four assists. In 2011, he made 19 appearances and recorded two assists. In 2012, he made 21 appearances and scored his first collegiate goal on October 27, 2012, in at 1–0 win in the final regular season match against Cincinnati to claim the third BIG East title in school history.

During his time in college, Granger also spent the 2010 and 2012 season with Portland Timbers U23s in the USL Premier Development League. In 2010, the Timbers U23s capped off a perfect season by winning their first USL PDL title.

=== Professional ===
On January 22, 2013, Granger was drafted in the third round (50th overall) of the 2013 MLS Supplemental Draft by Real Salt Lake. However, he did not sign with the club.

Granger later joined USL Pro club Dayton Dutch Lions and made his debut on April 20, 2013, in a 2–1 win over Pittsburgh Riverhounds.

Granger signed with Arizona United on February 13, 2015. He was released on August 10, 2017.

== Honors ==
=== Portland Timbers U23s ===
- USL PDL Champions (1): 2010
- USL PDL Western Conference Champions (1): 2010
- USL PDL Northwest Division Champions (1): 2010
