= West Carrollton City School District =

School district in Ohio

Address
- 430 East Pease Avenue West Carrollton, Ohio, 45449; United States

District information
- Type: Public
- Grades: PK–12
- Schools: 5
- NCES District ID: 3904505

Students and staff
- Students: 3,170 (2025–2026)
- Teachers: 204.28 (on an FTE basis) (2025–2026)
- Staff: 435.93 (on an FTE basis) (2025–2026)
- Student–teacher ratio: 15.52 (2025–2026)

West Carrollton City School District is the school district serving Miami Township, Moraine, and West Carrollton, Ohio with an enrollment of over 3800 students.

== Schools ==
- Walter Shade Early Childhood Center
- C.F. Holliday Elementary
- Frank Nicholas Elementary
- West Carrollton Elementary
- West Carrollton Middle School
- West Carrollton High School

== See also ==
- List of school districts in Ohio
