= Piada Italian Street Food =

American Italian restaurant chain

- Industry: Restaurants
- Founded: 2010; 16 years ago
- Founder: Chris Doody
- Headquarters: Columbus, Ohio, U.S.
- Number of locations: 61
- Area served: Ohio, Indiana, Kentucky, Minnesota, North Carolina, Pennsylvania & Texas
- Website: mypiada.com

Piada Italian Street Food is a fast casual Italian cuisine restaurant chain with 61 locations in 7 states (Ohio, Indiana, Kentucky, Minnesota, North Carolina, Pennsylvania and Texas). There are 26 locations in Ohio, 4 in Indiana, 1 in Kentucky, 3 in Minnesota, 5 in North Carolina, 3 in Pennsylvania and 19 in Texas.

The restaurant features custom-rolled wraps (Piadas) in a stone-grilled, thin-crusted dough made from organic flour and extra virgin olive oil, as well as chopped salads and pasta bowls. The chain features food prepared along an assembly line, and has been called an Italian copycat of Chipotle Mexican Grill.

Chris Doody, owner of the company, is a co-founder of the Bravo Brio Restaurant Group chain. He sold his stake to investors in 2006 and launched the Piada concept around the Italian "wrap-like sandwich" known as a Piada or Piadina, a street food he sampled in northern Italy. It is stuffed with pastas, meats, cheeses, sauce and vegetables. Piada also serves pasta bowls, chopped salads, power bowls and soups. They also offer cannoli chips as a dessert item. There is a kids menu featuring smaller versions of the main menu items.

== See also ==
- Piadina
- List of Italian restaurants
