= Darren Toby =

Trinidadian footballer (born 1982)

Personal information
- Full name: Darren Toby
- Date of birth: January 18, 1982 (age 44)
- Place of birth: Lowlands, Trinidad and Tobago
- Height: 5 ft 10 in (1.78 m)
- Position: Midfielder

Team information
- Current team: Utica City
- Number: 21

College career
Years	Team	Apps	(Gls)
2003	Mobile Rams		
2004–2007	Charleston Cougars		

Senior career*
Years	Team	Apps	(Gls)
2008–2012	Charlotte Eagles	101	(9)
2011–2020	Utica City FC (indoor)	184	(35)
2013	VSI Tampa Bay FC	22	(0)
2014–2017	Charlotte Eagles	20	(1)
2018–2019	Rochester Lancers	10	(0)
2023–2024	Rochester Lancers 2 (indoor)	18	(5)
2023–	Utica City (indoor)	14	(1)
- * Club domestic league appearances and goals as of November 27, 2024

Darren Toby (born January 18, 1982, in Lowlands) is a Trinidadian footballer who plays for Utica City FC in the Major Arena Soccer League.

== Career ==
=== College and amateur ===
Toby attended St. Clairs Coaching School in Tobago, where he was named the school league MVP in 2001, and prepped at Signal Hill where he served as team captain from 2001 to 2002. Was named MVP of the Tobago Futbol league in 2001 before coming to the United States to attend college in 2003.

He played college soccer at University of Mobile in 2003, where he was named a NAIA Third-Team All-American, before transferring to the College of Charleston in his sophomore year.

=== Professional ===
Undrafted out of college, Toby signed with the Charlotte Eagles in the USL Second Division in 2008. He made his professional debut on April 19, 2008, in Charlotte's 2008 season opener against Bermuda Hogges. He re-signed for a fourth season with Charlotte on December 6, 2010.

Toby returned to the Rochester Lancers in January 2023 to play for their Major Arena Soccer League 2 team.
