= Erik Tammer =

Dutch former professional footballer (born 1969)

Personal information
- Full name: Erik Tammer
- Date of birth: 29 June 1969 (age 57)
- Place of birth: Utrecht, Netherlands
- Height: 1.88 m (6 ft 2 in)
- Position: Forward

Team information
- Current team: Dayton Dutch Lions (owner)

Youth career
- VV de Meeuwen
- DSO/Ultrajectum
- UVV

Senior career*
Years	Team	Apps	(Gls)
1989–1990	Ajax	0	(0)
1989–1990	AZ	8	(4)
1990–1992	Excelsior	71	(47)
1992–1992	Belenenses	0	(0)
1992–1996	Heerenveen	101	(44)
1995–1998	Go Ahead Eagles	76	(44)
1998–2000	Sparta Rotterdam	40	(9)
2000	→ Cambuur (loan)	9	(1)
2000–2001	→ ADO Den Haag (loan)	17	(4)
2001–2003	Neptunus		
2003–2004	Zwart-Wit '28		
2004–2005	TONEGIDO		
2005–2006	Jodan Boys		
2006–2007	TONEGIDO		
2007–2010	HBS Craeyenhout		
- * Club domestic league appearances and goals

Erik Tammer (born 29 June 1969) is a Dutch former professional footballer who played as a striker. He is the current co-owner of USL League Two club Dayton Dutch Lions.

== Playing career ==
Tammer played youth football with VV de Meeuwen, DSO/Ultrajectum, UVV and Ajax. He experienced his senior breakthrough at Excelsior, where he became the 1991–92 Eerste Divisie top goalscorer, and subsequently was mostly known for his stint with Heerenveen. There, he reached promotion to the Eredivisie and during the same season reached the KNVB Cup final, which was eventually lost to his former club Ajax.

Tammer also experienced success at Go Ahead Eagles, and almost made a move to Spanish club Osasuna. The transfer did not go through in the end, as representatives of Osasuna believed that Tammer had made negative comments about the club. Tammer ended his professional career as a forward in 2001 after 322 games and 154 goals. After this, he continued playing at amateur level, where he retired as part of HBS Craeyenhout in 2010, where he was also an assistant coach in his last season due to injuries.

== Retirement ==
After his career, Tammer founded his own sports management company. In April 2006, he founded a job site for the sports industry with a partner. The purpose of the vacancy bank was to bring former professional athletes and the business community into contact with each other.

In November 2009, Tammer became co-owner of the American association football clubs Dayton Dutch Lions and Houston Dutch Lions. He was also a scout for Heerenveen since 2013. From July 2015, he became a scout for Eredivisie club NEC. Since July 2018, he became a scout for Utrecht.

== Honours ==
=== Club ===
Heerenveen

- Eerste Divisie play-offs: 1992–93
- KNVB Cup runner-up: 1992–93

=== Individual ===
- Eerste Divisie Golden Boot: 1991–92
