= Eli Garner =

American soccer player

Personal information
- Full name: Thomas Elijah Garner
- Date of birth: February 14, 1991 (age 35)
- Place of birth: Durham, North Carolina, United States
- Height: 5 ft 11 in (1.80 m)
- Position: Forward

Youth career
- 2009: North Carolina Tar Heels
- 2010–2011: UNC Greensboro Spartans

Senior career*
| Years | Team | Apps | (Gls) |
| 2012–2014 | Dayton Dutch Lions | 66 | (12) |
| 2014 | Orange County Blues | 5 | (0) |
| 2015 | Richmond Kickers | 17 | (2) |
- * Club domestic league appearances and goals as of December 31, 2015

Thomas Elijah "Eli" Garner (born February 14, 1991, in Durham, North Carolina) is an American soccer player. He has previously played for the Orange County Blues and the Dayton Dutch Lions.
