= Miami Dutch Lions FC =

- Full name: Miami Dutch Lions Football Club
- Nickname: The Lions
- Founded: 2011; 15 years ago, as Texas Dutch Lions FC; 2013; 13 years ago, as Houston Dutch Lions FC; 2019; 7 years ago, as Miami Dutch Lions FC
- Stadium: Ted Hendricks Stadium; Hialeah, Florida
- Owner: Martin Kroeze
- Vice president: Robbert Kroeze
- Head coach: Robert Stoutenburg
- League: National Premier Soccer League
- 2021: Sunshine Conference: 2nd Playoffs: Final
- Website: dutchlionsfc.com/miami
Home colors

Miami Dutch Lions FC is an American professional soccer club based in the Miami metropolitan area. The Lions competes in National Premier Soccer League, as a member of the Sunshine Conference. The club was founded in Conroe, Texas in 2011, before relocating to Olympia Heights, Florida in 2019. They are owned by Martin Kroeze.

== History ==
Miami Dutch Lions FC was formed on November 17, 2011, as Texas Dutch Lions FC, and played their inaugural season in the USL Premier Development League in 2012, finishing 4th in the Mid South Division of the Southern Conference.

The youth academy of the club began training in 2011, with only one location in Conroe, Texas. In 2012, the academy expanded to its second training location to service players in The Woodlands.

On April 1, 2013, Texas Dutch Lions FC changed their official name to Houston Dutch Lions FC. The club has been using the new title for several months, but it was not official until April 1.

The club signed a new head coach for the 2013 season, a former Dutch player Hans van Arum, on February 12, 2013.

On February 18, 2014, the Houston Dutch Lions FC announced the signing of Marco Pruis as their new head coach for the 2014 PDL season.

Since the 2016 season, the club joined the National Premier Soccer League, in which the team also played during the 2017 and 2018 season. During the 2016 season, the Dutch Lions FC played in the South Central Conference Playoffs (which they won). Due to several new teams, the 2017 NPSL season was divided into the Lone Star Conference (in which the Lions participated) and the Heartland Conference. In the 2018 NPSL season, the Lone Star Conference had 9 teams compete, the Dutch Lions FC fell to Laredo Heat SC on July 14, 2018, in a thrilling 4–3 final.

In November 2019, the club announced that it would relocate its NPSL side to Olympia Heights, Florida for the 2020 season, and would focus on its youth programs.

== Colors and badge ==
The Miami Dutch Lions FC crest is a modified version of Dayton Dutch Lions's logo, featuring the white and blue field, with an orange lion centered on the crest. The script above the vector lion reads the club's name. The home shirt consists of an orange shirt, orange shorts & orange socks. Away the team plays in a white shirt.

== Home ground ==
- Carl Barton Jr Soccer Park; Conroe, Texas (2011–2013)
- Houston Dutch Lions FC Soccer Facility; Conroe, Texas (2013–2019)
- Tropical Park Stadium; Olympia Heights, Florida (2019–2021)
- Ted Hendricks Stadium; Hialeah, Florida (2021–present)

== Training ground ==
- Houston Dutch Lions FC Soccer Facility; Conroe, Texas (October 2013 – 2019). The fields are the training grounds of the teams: USL Premier Development League, National Premier Soccer League, Houston Football Association, and the club's youth academy. After the fields opening up in October 2014, the club opened a unique club house in May 2015. The club house consists of dressing rooms, club house for fans with A/C, restrooms and a banquet room. The top floor has 4 offices and two banquet rooms for the office staff.

Just before the 2018 NPSL season, the club build seats in front of the club house, which added about 200 seats to the Soccer Facility.

== Club culture ==
=== International partnerships ===
The Houston Dutch Lions FC share in the partnership of their ownership group and sister club, Dayton Dutch Lions, with Dutch Eredivisie champions, FC Twente. On January 17, 2011, the Dutch Lions Group signed a five-year contract to foster development of players, academy teams, training practices, and possibly facilitate loans or transfers of players between teams. In the 2014 season, the Cincinnati Dutch Lions FC were added (joined the PDL). As of the summer of 2015, the Florida Gulf Coast Dutch Lions FC joined the Dutch Lions FC group.

On May 5, 2016, the Dutch Lions FC announced the signing of Heineken for their Dutch Lions FC NPSL squad. Early 2017, the club announced CHI St. Luke's Woodlands Hospital as their sponsor.

== Game history ==
=== Staff ===
Executive staff

| Position | Staff |
|---|---|
| President | Martin Kroeze |
| Vice President | Robbert Kroeze |
| CEO | Dennis Kroeze |
| Director of Soccer Operations | Marco Pruis |

Source: Official Staff

Coaching staff NPSL 2021 season

| Position | Staff |
|---|---|
| Head Coach | Robert Stoutenburg |
| Assistant Coach | Lucas Martorana |
| Assistant & Goalkeeper Coach | TJ Deneal |

Source: Official Staff

Coaching staff NPSL 2018 season

| Position | Staff |
|---|---|
| Head Coach | Marco Pruis |
| Assistant Coach | Michiel van de Heijning |
| Goalkeeper Coach | Leroy Zuiddam |
| Team Manager | Carlos Ortiz |

Source: Official Staff

=== Head coaches ===
- (Netherlands) Robert Maaskant (2012)
- (Netherlands) Hans van Arum (2013)
- (Netherlands) Marco Pruis (2014–2020)
- (Netherlands) Robert Stoutenburg (2020 - Present)

=== Year-by-year ===
| Year | Division | League | Regular season | Playoffs | Open Cup | Record |
|---|---|---|---|---|---|---|
| 2012 | 4 | USL PDL | 4th, Mid South Division | Did not qualify | Did not qualify | 6-8-4 |
| 2013 | 4 | USL PDL | 5th, Mid South Division | Did not qualify | Did not qualify | 4-7-3 |
| 2014 | 4 | USL PDL | 5th, Mid South Division | Did not qualify | Did not qualify | 1-10-3 |
| 2015 | 4 | USL PDL | 4th, Mid South Division | Did not qualify | Did not qualify | 4-6-2 |
| 2016 | 4 | NPSL | 2nd, South Central Conference | Final | Did not qualify | 11-2-2 |
| 2017 | 4 | NPSL | 2nd, Lone Star Conference | Semifinal | Second round | 6-1-3 |
| 2018 | 4 | NPSL | 3rd, Lone Star Conference | Final | Did not qualify | 9-4-0 |
| 2020 | 4 | NPSL | ~~Sunshine Conference~~ Canceled | Canceled | Did not qualify | – |
| 2021 | 4 | NPSL | 2nd, Sunshine Conference | Final | Did not qualify | 6-3-1 |

NPSL 2016 Playoffs: On Saturday, July 9, 2016, the Dutch Lions FC beat FC Wichita 5–0 at home in the South Conference semifinal (the division final four was played in Tulsa, Oklahoma). The Liverpool Warriors fell 4–1 that same day to the Tulsa Athletic. The South Central Conference title went to the Dutch Lions FC after the team beat the Tulsa Athletic 1–2 in the final on Sunday, July 10. What followed was the Regional Playoffs semifinal vs Chattanooga FC, which the Lions lost 4–0.

2017 U.S. Open Cup: On May 10, 2017, the Dutch Lions FC hosted the NTX Rayados and beat them 3–1. One week later, the team fell home against USL Championship side San Antonio FC 1–2 in the second round.

2018 NPSL season: The club boosted another winning season in the NPSL, winning 9 games and losing 4 games. Goals scored are 49, and goals conceded was 17.

== Average attendance ==
Attendance stats are calculated by averaging each team's self-reported home attendances from the historical match archive.

- 2012: 120
- 2013: 150
- 2014: 175
- 2015: 200
- 2016: 275
- 2017: 315
- 2018: 275

== See also ==
- Cincinnati Dutch Lions
- Dayton Dutch Lions
- Florida Gulf Coast Dutch Lions
