= West Carrollton, Ohio =

- City
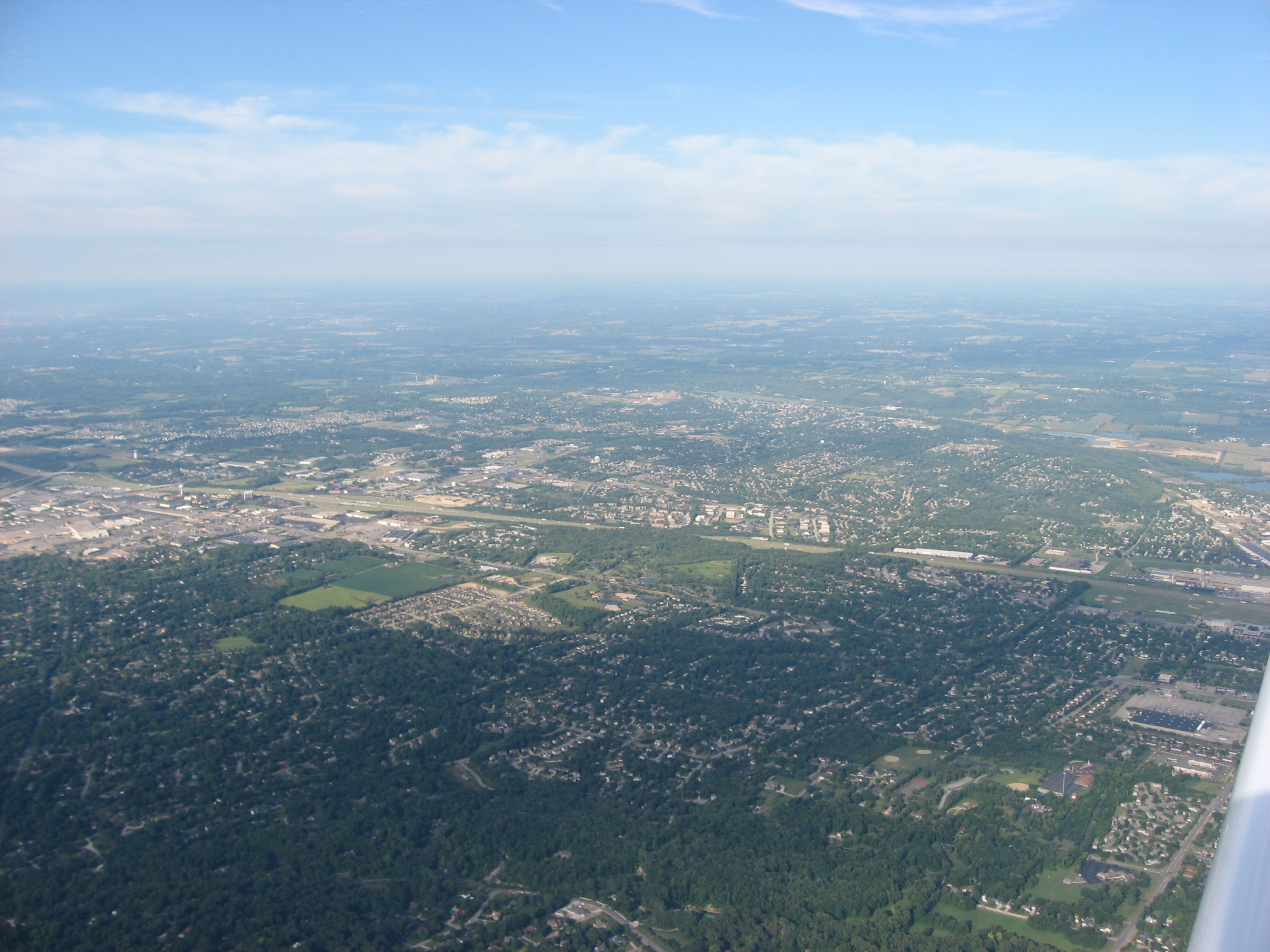
- Aerial view of West Carrollton

- Flag Logo
- Interactive map of West Carrollton, Ohio
- Location within Ohio Location within the United States
- Coordinates: 39°40′05″N 84°14′50″W
- Country: United States
- State: Ohio
- County: Montgomery

Government
  - Mayor: Richard Barnhart

Area
  - Total: 6.65 sq mi (17.23 km^{2})
  - Land: 6.43 sq mi (16.65 km^{2})
  - Water: 0.22 sq mi (0.58 km^{2})
- Elevation: 715 ft (218 m)

Population (2020)
  - Total: 13,129
  - Density: 2,042.3/sq mi (788.55/km^{2})
- Time zone: UTC-5 (Eastern (EST))
  - Summer (DST): UTC-4 (EDT)
- ZIP code: 45449
- Area codes: 937, 326
- FIPS code: 39-83111
- GNIS feature ID: 1065462
- Website: www.westcarrollton.org

West Carrollton is a city in Montgomery County, Ohio, United States. A suburb of Dayton, Ohio, its population was 13,129 at the 2020 census. It is part of the Dayton metropolitan area. The Great Miami River runs through the town and forms most of its northern border.

== Geography ==
According to the United States Census Bureau, the city has a total area of 6.66 square miles (17.25 km^{2}), of which 6.44 square miles (16.68 km^{2}) is land and 0.22 square miles (0.57 km^{2}) is water.

== Demographics ==
Historical population
Census	Pop.	Note	%±
1850	226		—
1870	350		—
1890	360		—
1900	987		174.2%
1910	1,285		30.2%
1920	1,430		11.3%
1930	2,101		46.9%
1940	2,176		3.6%
1950	2,876		32.2%
1960	4,749		65.1%
1970	10,748		126.3%
1980	13,148		22.3%
1990	14,403		9.5%
2000	13,818		−4.1%
2010	13,143		−4.9%
2020	13,129		−0.1%
2025 (est.)	12,963		−1.3%

=== 2020 census ===
As of the 2020 census, West Carrollton had a population of 13,129. The median age was 38.3 years. 19.3% of residents were under the age of 18 and 18.0% of residents were 65 years of age or older. For every 100 females there were 91.0 males, and for every 100 females age 18 and over there were 88.7 males age 18 and over.

As of the 2020 census, 99.5% of residents lived in urban areas, while 0.5% lived in rural areas.

As of the 2020 census, there were 6,131 households in West Carrollton, of which 23.7% had children under the age of 18 living in them. Of all households, 33.0% were married-couple households, 22.6% were households with a male householder and no spouse or partner present, and 34.0% were households with a female householder and no spouse or partner present. About 37.6% of all households were made up of individuals and 13.8% had someone living alone who was 65 years of age or older.

As of the 2020 census, there were 6,495 housing units, of which 5.6% were vacant. The homeowner vacancy rate was 1.5% and the rental vacancy rate was 5.0%.

Racial composition as of the 2020 census
Race	Number	Percent
White	10,199	77.7%
Black or African American	1,512	11.5%
American Indian and Alaska Native	31	0.2%
Asian	224	1.7%
Native Hawaiian and Other Pacific Islander	7	0.1%
Some other race	310	2.4%
Two or more races	846	6.4%
Hispanic or Latino (of any race)	696	5.3%

=== 2010 census ===
As of the census of 2010, there were 13,143 people, 5,973 households, and 3,378 families living in the city. The population density was 2,040.8 inhabitants per square mile (788.0/km^{2}). There were 6,522 housing units at an average density of 1,012.7 per square mile (391.0/km^{2}). The racial makeup of the city was 86.8% White, 8.9% African American, 0.3% Native American, 1.1% Asian, 0.9% from other races, and 2.0% from two or more races. Hispanic or Latino of any race were 2.6% of the population.

There were 5,973 households, of which 27.3% had children under the age of 18 living with them, 37.4% were married couples living together, 13.4% had a female householder with no husband present, 5.7% had a male householder with no wife present, and 43.4% were non-families. 35.1% of all households were made up of individuals, and 10.7% had someone living alone who was 65 years of age or older. The average household size was 2.18 and the average family size was 2.81.

The median age in the city was 37.5 years. 21.1% of residents were under the age of 18; 9.7% were between the ages of 18 and 24; 29.3% were from 25 to 44; 25.4% were from 45 to 64; and 14.5% were 65 years of age or older. The gender makeup of the city was 48.2% male and 51.8% female.

=== 2000 census ===
As of the census of 2000, there were 13,818 people, 6,134 households, and 3,704 families living in the city. The population density was 2,190.7 inhabitants per square mile (845.8/km^{2}). There were 6,562 housing units at an average density of 1,040.3 per square mile (401.7/km^{2}). The racial makeup of the city was 92.59% White, 5.21% African American, 0.21% Native American, 1.18% Asian, 0.01% Pacific Islander, 0.51% from other races, and 1.30% from two or more races. Hispanic or Latino of any race were 1.44% of the population.

There were 6,134 households, out of which 27.4% had children under the age of 18 living with them, 45.0% were married couples living together, 11.4% had a female householder with no husband present, and 39.6% were non-families. 32.0% of all households were made up of individuals, and 8.6% had someone living alone who was 65 years of age or older. The average household size was 2.24 and the average family size was 2.83.

In the city the population was spread out, with 22.2% under the age of 18, 10.1% from 18 to 24, 32.8% from 25 to 44, 22.5% from 45 to 64, and 12.4% who were 65 years of age or older. The median age was 35 years. For every 100 females, there were 92.3 males. For every 100 females age 18 and over, there were 88.6 males.

The median income for a household in the city was $40,964, and the median income for a family was $48,832. Males had a median income of $38,382 versus $25,591 for females. The per capita income for the city was $20,721. About 6.1% of families and 7.4% of the population were below the poverty line, including 12.9% of those under age 18 and 6.9% of those age 65 or over.

== History ==
West Carrollton was originally called Carrollton, and under the latter name was laid out in 1830. This change was said to have occurred in response to the amount of mail erroneously received for the second city of Carrollton, OH. Before its current city symbol, the symbol of West Carrollton was a simple pentagon, designed in the 1970’s by James Williamson, a Dayton artist. This resembled the city's rich transportation history, as the small town at one point had five forms of transport running through it: train, canal, riverboats, trolleys and cars.

== Education ==
Public education in West Carrollton is provided by the West Carrollton City School District. The school district also services Moraine, Ohio. The current superintendent of West Carrollton City Schools is Dr. Andrea Townsend. West Carrollton High School is the only high school the West Carrollton City School District. Athletic teams are known as the "Pirates" and the school colors are scarlet and black. As of the 2013–14 school year, the school has an enrollment of approximately 900 students. There are four elementary schools and one early childhood center in the district. West Carrollton has been rated as "Effective" since 2002 by the Ohio Department of Education.

West Carrollton has a public library, a branch of the Dayton Metro Library.
