= Dayton Dutch Lions =

- Full name: Dayton Dutch Lions Football Club
- Nickname: Lions
- Founded: 2009; 17 years ago
- Stadium: Dayton Outpatient Center Stadium; West Carrollton, OH
- Capacity: 3,500
- Owners: Dr. Suresh Gupta; Erik Tammer; Mike Mossel
- Head Coach: Dan Griest
- League: USL League Two
- 2023: 5th, Valley Division; Playoffs: DNQ
- Website: dutchlionsfc.com/dayton
Home colors	Away colors

The Dayton Dutch Lions are an American soccer team based in Dayton, Ohio, United States. Founded in 2009, the team plays in USL League Two, the fourth tier of the American Soccer Pyramid. From 2011 to 2014, the team played in the USL Professional Division (USL Pro). They are the American feeder team for Dutch team FC Twente.

The team plays its home games at the Dayton Outpatient Center Stadium on the campus of West Carrollton High School in nearby West Carrollton, Ohio. The team's colors are orange, white and blue.

== History ==
The club was started in the fall of 2009 and co-owned by Erik Tammer of Tammer Sportmanagement and Mike Mossel of Business and Sports Performance. Tammer is a former professional soccer player in the Netherlands who played for clubs such as Heerenveen and Sparta Rotterdam, while Mossel played in Europe for RBC Roosendaal and Turnhout and in the USL for the Cincinnati Riverhawks.

The team played its first competitive game on May 8, 2010, a 3–3 tie with the Cincinnati Kings. The first goal in franchise history was scored by Eddie Hertsenberg.

On July 8, 2010, the Lions announced that they would be self-promoting to the USL Second Division for the 2011 season, as well as adding a brand new women's team in the USL W-League. During the announcement, team owner Mossel said "The promotion to USL-2 and development of a W-League club was just a matter of time. To be the best, we must begin to play among the upper-echelon clubs. We want to set a standard, and I believe we have done that so far in the PDL in our first season. But more importantly, our decision was made with our Premier Academy in mind.". With the merger of the USL First and Second Divisions to form USL Pro in 2011, the Dutch Lions were announced as a founding team.

In 2012, the Lions reached the quarterfinals of the 2012 Lamar Hunt U.S. Open Cup, where they defeated the MLS Columbus Crew 2–1 in the third round, then defeated the Michigan Bucks in the fourth round in extra time. They were knocked out of the tournament in the quarterfinals by eventual champions Sporting Kansas City 3–0 in front of an away record 15,167 fans.

In 2013, the Lions reached the USL Pro Playoffs for the first time with a record of 10 Wins, 7 Ties and 9 Losses. They lost to the Richmond Kickers 1–0 in the quarter-finals. Gibson Bardsley received Second Team All-League Honors with 9 goals and 7 assists.

In 2014, the Lions partnered with West Carrollton City Schools and Dr. Suresh Gupta of the Dayton Outpatient Center to install a new playing surface in the West Carrollton High School Stadium as part of a 30-year deal. The renovated stadium was renamed the Dayton Outpatient Center Stadium.

Renovations started on March 10, 2014 and were completed with a ribbon-cutting ceremony on May 9, 2014. The Motz Group, a Cincinnati-based company that specializes in building playing fields, replaced the existing grass field with artificial turf at a cost of $450,000 to $475,000. The combined costs for the renovations to the stadium and installation of lights on practice fields are estimated at $529,000.

The opening match at DOC Stadium, with the presence of two-time FIFA World Player of the Year Ruud Gullit, was a United Soccer League professional soccer game on May 10, 2014, that saw the Dayton Dutch Lions tie the LA Galaxy II, 1–1. A home record attendance of 1,527 was announced.

In 2018, the Lions had a record-setting season, matching its best record ever, winning the Great Lakes Division championship and earning qualification for the 2019 U.S. Open Cup.

== Stadium ==
- Miami Valley South Stadium; Bellbrook, Ohio (2010–2012)
- Beavercreek High School Stadium; Beavercreek, Ohio (2013–2014)
- Dayton Outpatient Center Stadium; West Carrollton, Ohio (2014–present)

== Club culture, kits, sponsors and supporters ==
=== International partnership ===
On January 17, 2011, the Dutch Lions signed a five-year contract with Dutch Eredivisie champions, FC Twente, to foster development of players, academy teams, training practices, and possibly facilitate loans or transfers of players between the two teams.

=== Domestic partnership ===
Additional Dutch Lions clubs have been added over the years and partner with Dayton in branding, best practices, and player considerations.

In the 2011, the Houston Dutch Lions were added (joined NPSL in 2016). In the 2014, the Cincinnati Dutch Lions were added (joined the PDL). In 2015, the Florida Gulf Coast Dutch Lions were added. In 2016, the New York Dutch Lions were added.

On December 19, 2013, the Columbus Crew of Major League Soccer announced an affiliation with the Dutch Lions which would begin with the 2014 season. The affiliation meant the opportunity for loans between the two which aim ultimately to improve the quality of play at both clubs. After the Crew's 2014 opener against D.C. United, the club announced it was sending 5 of its players on loan to the Dutch Lions for the season, including 2013 draft pick, forward Ryan Finley.

=== Youth Partnerships ===
The Dutch Lions Group's brand statement is "Gateway to Professional Soccer" and the purported goal of the Dutch Lions' program is to develop youth and amateur players into professional players. The Dutch Lions FC's holding company, Dutch Lions Group USA LLC, maintains a youth academy in connection with the Dutch Lions. The Ohio-based youth academy previously reported membership numbers as high as 200 players. The youth academy partners with the Ohio Galaxies FC to develop youth talent.

=== Kit maker / jersey sponsors ===
- 2010: Jems Sportswear Inc. . . . .Primary Sponsor ~ Scout for All. . . . . . . . . . . . . . . . . .(Back - Coolidge Wall Co, L.P.A. & Sleeve - Courtyard Marriott & Dayton Outpatient Center)
- 2011: Under Armour. . . . . . . . . . Primary Sponsor ~ Scout for All. . . . . . . . . . . . . . . . . .(Back - Coolidge Wall Co, L.P.A. & Sleeve - Courtyard Marriott & Dayton Outpatient Center)
- 2012: Umbro. . . . . . . . . . . . . . . . Primary Sponsor ~ Scout for All. . . . . . . . . . . . . . . . . .(Back - Coolidge Wall Co, L.P.A. & Sleeve - Crowne Plaza & I Love Stroop Waffles)
- 2013: LA One. . . . . . . . . . . . . . . Primary Sponsor ~ Dayton Outpatient Center . . . . . . .(Back - Coolidge Wall Co, L.P.A. & Sleeve - Crowne Plaza & Mike-sell's)
- 2014: Nike . . . . . . . . . . . . . . . . . Primary Sponsor ~ Kettering Health Network . . . . . . .(Back - Coolidge Wall Co, L.P.A. & Sleeve - Crowne Plaza & Mike-sell's)
- 2015: Nike . . . . . . . . . . . . . . . . . Primary Sponsor ~ Kettering Health Network . . . . . . .(Back - Coolidge Wall Co, L.P.A. & Sleeve - Crowne Plaza & Mike-sell's)
- 2016: Nike . . . . . . . . . . . . . . . . . Primary Sponsor ~ Coca-Cola. . . . . . . . . . . . . . . . . . .(Back - ALT Architecture Inc. & Sleeve - Piada & Mike-sell's)
- 2017: Nike . . . . . . . . . . . . . . . . . Primary Sponsor ~ Coca-Cola. . . . . . . . . . . . . . . . . . .(Back - ALT Architecture Inc. & Sleeve - Piada & Mike-sell's)
- 2018: Geco Sportswear Inc. . . . .Primary Sponsor ~ Coca-Cola. . . . . . . . . . . . . . . . . . .(Sleeve - Dayton Outpatient Center)

=== Supporters group ===
The main supporters of the Dutch Lions are the Oranje Legion.

== Owners, staff and players ==
=== Ownership ===
Position	Name	Years
Majority Owner	Dr. Suresh Gupta	2013
Minority Owner	5 River Investments	2012
Minority Owner	Dutch Lions Capital Group	2009

=== Soccer staff ===
Position	Mame
USL2 Head Coach	Dan Griest
Assistant coach	Kevin Terrell
USL W Head Coach	TBA
Assistant coach	TBA
General Manager	Alex Ash

=== Head coaches ===
Country	Name	Years
(Netherlands)	Sonny Silooy	2010
(Netherlands)	Ivar van Dinteren	2011–2012
(Netherlands)	Patrick Bal	2013
(Netherlands)	Sid van Druenen	2013–2014
(England)	Matt Weston	2014
(Netherlands)	Patrick Bal	2015
(Netherlands)	Sid van Druenen	2016
(England)	Marcus Rixon	2017
(United States)	Dan Griest	2018–2020
(Netherlands)	Sid van Druenen	2021
(Netherlands)	Hans Pascoal	2022-2024
(United States)	Dan Griest	2025-

=== Notable Former Professional, Amateur and Academy Players ===
- (Ghana) Amass Amankona selected as the #46 pick (Round 3, Pick 5) at the 2016 MLS SuperDraft by Real Salt Lake; signed in 2018 by Indy Eleven USL PRO team.
- (United States) Rose Lavelle selected as the #1 pick (Round 1, Pick 1) at the 2017 NWSL College Draft by the Boston Breakers; signed in 2017 by the Breakers. Currently with Gotham FC.
- (United States) Stefan Cleveland selected as the #26 pick (Round 2, Pick 4) at the 2017 MLS SuperDraft by Chicago Fire; signed in 2017 by the Fire.
- (United States) Chris Froschauer selected as the #43 pick (Round 3, Pick 2) at the 2016 MLS SuperDraft by Colorado Rapids; signed in 2017 by the Rapids.
- Emillie Fillion signed in 2013 by FC Twente in the BeNe League in the Netherlands winning the championship; signed 2014 by MSV Duisburg (women) in the Frauen Bundesliga in Germany.
- (Guyana) Brittany Persaud signed in 2012 by ADO Den Haag in the BeNe League in the Netherlands; signed 2013 by Alkmaar in the same league in the Netherlands .
- (United States) George Davis IV signed in 2011 by Dayton Dutch Lions; played USL PRO for Los Angeles Blues, Orlando City SC, Richmond Kickers and currently with Louisville City FC.
- (United States) Kyle Segebart signed in 2011 by Dayton Dutch Lions; signed in 2012 by Team Wellington in the ASB Premiership in New Zealand.
- Julius Willie signed in 2011 by AGOVV Apeldoorn in the Eerste Divisie in the Netherlands; signed 2011-12 by Dayton Dutch Lions.
- (United States) Evan Schwartz signed in 2011 by Dayton Dutch Lions; signed by Knattspyrnufélagið Víkingur in the Úrvalsdeild in Iceland.
- (United States) Bret Jones signed in 2011 by Dayton Dutch Lions.
- (United States) Eric Kissinger signed in 2010 by Dayton Dutch Lions.
- (Haiti) Sébastien Thurière is a Haitian footballer who played for the Dutch Lions in 2014. He last played for Penang in Malaysia Premier League.
- Dan Bent spent one season with the Dutch Lions in 2016, becoming an international player for Gibraltar in 2024.

== Record ==
=== Overall (56-87-45) ===
- 22-53-27 in USL PRO League Matches (0-1-0 Playoffs)
- 27-27-18 in USL PDL League Matches (0-1-0 Playoffs)
- 7- 5 -0 in US OPEN CUP Matches

=== Year-by-year ===
Year	League	Rank	P	W	L	T	GF	GA	GD	PTS	Playoffs	Open Cup
2010	PDL	3	16	8	3	5	32	20	+12	29	—	1R (0-1)
2011	USL Pro	12	24	2	16	6	21	54	−33	12	—	1R (0-1)
2012	USL Pro	9	24	4	10	10	20	29	−9	22	—	QF (3-1)
2013	USL Pro	8	26	10	9	7	43	46	−3	37	QF (0-1)	3R (2-1)
2014	USL Pro	14	28	6	18	4	28	63	−35	22	—	3R (2-1)
2015	PDL	5	14	3	9	2	12	30	−18	11	—	—
2016	PDL	4	14	4	5	5	23	30	−7	17	—	—
2017	PDL	5	14	4	7	3	10	22	−12	15	—	—
2018	PDL	1	14	8	3	3	29	15	+14	27	CSF (0-1)	—
2019	USL2	4	12	5	6	1	17	19	-2	16	—	2R (1-1)
2020	USL2	Season cancelled due to COVID-19 pandemic										
2021	USL2	9	14	0	13	1	14	50	-36	1	—	—
2022	USL2	5	14	2	10	2	13	53	-40	7	—	—
2023	USL2	5	12	2	7	3	11	24	-13	9	—	—
2024	USL2	6	12	2	10	0	5	30	-25	6	—	—
2025	USL2	6	12	2	2	8	10	20	-10	8	—	—
2026	USL2	5	12	4	1	7	15	22	-7	13	—	—

As of 10 July 2021
Rank = Rank in the league; P = League Played; W = Win; D = Draw; L = Loss; GF = Goals for; GA = Goals against; GD = Goal difference; Pts = Points; Playoffs = USL Pro Playoffs; Open Cup = Lamar Hunt US Open Cup.
— = Did not Qualify; 1R = 1st round; 2R = 2nd round; 3R = 3rd round; 1/8 = Round of sixteen; CSF = Conference Semifinals; QF = Quarterfinals; SF = Semifinals; F = Final.

=== Top goal scorers in USL PRO ===
#	Pos.	Name	Career	USL Pro	Playoffs	US Open Cup	Total
1	Forward	Gibson Bardsley	2012–2013	14	0	2	16
2	Forward	Thomas Garner	2012–2014	12	0	3	15
3	Forward	Aaron Schoenfeld	2014	12	0	1	13
4	Midfielder	Joel DeLass	2011–2014	8	0	2	10

As of 5 September 2014

=== Top assists in USL PRO ===
#	Pos.	Name	Career	USL Pro	Playoffs	US Open Cup	Total
1	Forward	Gibson Bardsley	2012–2013	8	0	1	9
2	Forward	Thomas Garner	2012–2014	7	0	0	7
3	Midfield	Joel DeLass	2011–2014	4	0	1	5

As of 5 September 2014

=== Top appearances in USL Pro ===
#	Pos.	Name	Career	USL Pro	Playoffs	US Open Cup	Total
1	Midfield	Joel DeLass	2011–2014	91	1	10	102
2	Defender	Shane Smith	2011–2014	81	0	9	90
3	Goalkeeper	Matt Williams	2012–2014	78	1	7	85
4	Forward	Thomas Garner	2012–2014	66	1	8	75

As of 5 September 2014

== Average attendance ==
Attendance stats are calculated by averaging each team's self-reported home attendances from the historical match archive at United Soccer Leagues (USL)

- 2010: 1,274 (6th in PDL)
- 2011: 560 (USL Pro -only 9 games reported attendance, average taken from those)
- 2012: 716 (10th in USL Pro)
- 2013: 699 (USL Pro -only 10 of 14 games reported attendance, average taken from those)
- 2014: 533 (14th in USL Pro)
- 2015: 411 (PDL Great Lakes Division)
- 2016: 552 (PDL Great Lakes Division)
- 2017: 447 (PDL Great Lakes Division)
- 2018: 458 (PDL Great Lakes Division)

== See also ==
- Cincinnati Dutch Lions
- Florida Gulf Coast Dutch Lions
- Miami Dutch Lions
