= 2018 New York Red Bulls season =

New York Red Bulls
2018 season
- Sporting director: Denis Hamlett
- Head coach: Jesse Marsch (until July 6); Chris Armas (from July 6)
- Major League Soccer: Conference: 1st Overall: 1st
- MLS Cup playoffs: Conference finals
- U.S. Open Cup: Round of 16
- CONCACAF Champions League: Semi-finals
- Top goalscorer: League: Bradley Wright-Phillips (20 goals); All: Bradley Wright-Phillips (24 goals)
- Highest home attendance: 25,219
- Lowest home attendance: 14,768
- Average home league attendance: 18,583
Home colors	Away colors

The 2018 New York Red Bulls season was the club's twenty-third season in Major League Soccer, the top division of soccer in the United States.

== Team information ==
=== Squad information ===
As of November 29, 2018

Appearances and goals are career totals from all-competitions.

Squad No.	Name	Nationality	Position(s)	Date of birth (age)	Signed from	Games played	Goals scored
Goalkeepers
18	Ryan Meara	(United States)	GK	November 15, 1990 (aged 28)	(United States) Fordham University	38	0
24	Evan Louro	(United States)	GK	January 1, 1996 (aged 22)	Academy	0	0
31	Luis Robles (Captain)	(United States)	GK	May 11, 1984 (aged 34)	(Germany) Karlsruher SC	243	0
Defenders
3	Kevin Politz	(United States)	CB	March 22, 1996 (aged 22)	Academy	0	0
5	Connor Lade	(United States)	RB/LB	November 16, 1989 (aged 29)	Academy	137	4
6	Kyle Duncan	(United States)	RB	December 27, 1997 (aged 20)	(France) Valenciennes	4	0
21	Tommy Redding	(United States)	CB	January 24, 1997 (aged 21)	(United States) Orlando City SC	1	0
26	Tim Parker	(United States)	CB	February 23, 1993 (aged 25)	(Canada) Vancouver Whitecaps FC	38	2
29	Fidel Escobar	(Panama)	CB	January 9, 1995 (aged 23)	(Panama) Sporting San Miguelito (on loan)	13	0
33	Aaron Long	(United States)	CB	October 12, 1992 (aged 26)	(United States) New York Red Bulls II	89	5
41	Ethan Kutler	(United States)	RB	May 1, 1995 (aged 23)	(United States) New York Red Bulls II	5	0
47	Hassan Ndam	(Cameroon)	CB	October 29, 1998 (aged 20)	(Cameroon) Rainbow F.C.	4	0
62	Michael Amir Murillo	(Panama)	RB/CB	February 11, 1996 (aged 22)	(Panama) San Francisco	55	3
78	Aurélien Collin	(France)	CB	March 8, 1986 (aged 32)	(United States) Orlando City SC	57	0
92	Kemar Lawrence	(Jamaica)	LB	September 17, 1992 (aged 26)	(Jamaica) Harbour View	122	4
Midfielders
4	Tyler Adams	(United States)	CM	February 14, 1999 (aged 19)	Academy	74	3
7	Derrick Etienne	(Haiti)	LW/RW	November 25, 1996 (aged 22)	Academy	66	5
9	Andreas Ivan	(Romania)	RW/LW	January 10, 1995 (aged 23)	(Germany) SV Waldhof Mannheim	11	0
10	Alejandro Romero Gamarra	(Paraguay)	CM	January 11, 1995 (aged 23)	(Argentina) Huracán	38	7
17	Ben Mines	(United States)	CM	May 12, 2000 (aged 18)	Academy	1	1
19	Alex Muyl	(United States)	RW/LW	September 30, 1995 (aged 23)	Academy	109	10
22	Florian Valot	(France)	CM	February 13, 1993 (aged 25)	(United States) New York Red Bulls II	20	3
23	Cristian Cásseres	(Venezuela)	CM	January 20, 2000 (aged 18)	(Venezuela) Deportivo La Guaira	3	0
27	Sean Davis	(United States)	CM	February 8, 1993 (aged 25)	Academy	122	6
77	Daniel Royer	(Austria)	RW/LW	May 22, 1990 (aged 28)	(Denmark) FC Midtjylland	82	32
88	Vincent Bezecourt	(France)	CM	June 10, 1993 (aged 25)	(United States) New York Red Bulls II	14	1
90	Marc Rzatkowski	(Germany)	CM	March 2, 1990 (aged 28)	(Austria) Red Bull Salzburg (on loan)	33	3
	Jean-Christophe Koffi	(Ivory Coast)	CM	January 5, 1998 (aged 20)	(United States) D.C. United	0	0
Forwards
16	Anatole Abang	(Cameroon)	FW	July 6, 1996 (aged 22)	(Cameroon) Rainbow Bamenda	29	6
42	Brian White	(United States)	FW	February 3, 1996 (aged 22)	(United States) New York Red Bulls II	6	1
99	Bradley Wright-Phillips	(England)	FW	March 12, 1985 (aged 33)	(England) Charlton Athletic	211	124

== Roster transactions ==
=== In ===
#	Pos.	Player	Signed from	Details	Date	Source
62	DF	(Panama) Michael Amir Murillo	(Panama) San Francisco	Signed permanently from loan	November 27, 2017	
25	FW	(United States) Stefano Bonomo	(United States) New York Red Bulls II	Free transfer	December 18, 2017	
22	MF	(France) Florian Valot	(United States) New York Red Bulls II	Free transfer	December 20, 2017	
88	MF	(France) Vincent Bezecourt	Free Agent	Re-signed with club	December 22, 2017	
11	FW	(Colombia) Carlos Rivas	(United States) Orlando City SC	$150,000 GAM and Kljestan	January 3, 2018	
21	DF	(United States) Tommy Redding	(United States) Orlando City SC	$150,000 GAM and Kljestan	January 3, 2018	
3	DF	(United States) Kevin Politz	Academy	Homegrown player	January 3, 2018	
17	MF	(United States) Ben Mines	Academy	Homegrown player	January 8, 2018	
20	FW	(United States) Amando Moreno	(Mexico) Tijuana	Free transfer	January 10, 2018	
90	MF	(Germany) Marc Rzatkowski	(Austria) Red Bull Salzburg	Season long loan	January 31, 2018	
23	MF	(Venezuela) Cristian Cásseres	(Venezuela) Deportivo La Guaira	Undisclosed	February 2, 2018	
10	MF	(Paraguay) Alejandro Romero Gamarra	(Argentina) Huracán	$6.25 million	February 16, 2018	
26	DF	(United States) Tim Parker	(Canada) Vancouver Whitecaps FC	$500,000 TAM and Felipe	March 2, 2018	
6	DF	(United States) Kyle Duncan	(France) Valenciennes	Free Transfer	March 9, 2018	
41	DF	(United States) Ethan Kutler	(United States) New York Red Bulls II	Free Transfer	May 1, 2018	
9	MF	(Romania) Andreas Ivan	(Germany) Waldhof Mannheim	Free Transfer	July 20, 2018	
42	FW	(United States) Brian White	(United States) New York Red Bulls II	Free Transfer	August 4, 2018	
	MF	(Ivory Coast) Jean-Christophe Koffi	(United States) D.C. United	$75,000 GAM	September 7, 2018	

=== Out ===
#	Pos.	Player	Signed by	Details	Date	Source
15	DF	(United States) Sal Zizzo	(United States) Atlanta United FC	Option Declined	November 27, 2017	
3	DF	(Ghana) Gideon Baah	(Kazakhstan) Kairat-A	Option Declined	November 27, 2017	
13	MF	(United States) Mike Grella	(United States) Columbus Crew	Option Declined	November 27, 2017	
22	MF	(United States) Dilly Duka	(United States) FC Motown	Option Declined	November 27, 2017	
6	MF	(United States) Dan Metzger	(United States) Penn FC	Option Declined	November 27, 2017	
17	MF	(United States) Arun Basuljevic	(Denmark) Fremad Amager	Option Declined	November 27, 2017	
88	MF	(France) Vincent Bezecourt	Free Agent (Note: Following Bezecourt's release he was re-signed on December 22, 2017)	Option Declined	November 27, 2017	
12	MF	(Bermuda) Zeiko Lewis	(Iceland) FH	Option Declined	November 27, 2017	
30	FW	(Argentina) Gonzalo Verón	(Argentina) Independiente	Option Declined	November 27, 2017	
21	FW	(United States) Brandon Allen	(United States) Bethlehem Steel	Option Declined	November 27, 2017	
55	DF	(France) Damien Perrinelle	Free Agent	Contract Expired	November 27, 2017	
16	MF	(United States) Sacha Kljestan	(United States) Orlando City SC	Traded for Rivas and Redding	January 3, 2018	
10	FW	(Norway) Muhamed Keita	Free Agent	Waived	February 3, 2018	
8	MF	(Brazil) Felipe	(Canada) Vancouver Whitecaps FC	Traded for Tim Parker	March 2, 2018	
20	FW	(United States) Amando Moreno	(United States) New York Red Bulls II	Waived	March 16, 2018	
25	FW	(United States) Stefano Bonomo	(United States) Tampa Bay Rowdies	Waived	June 28, 2018	
11	FW	(Colombia) Carlos Rivas	(Colombia) Atlético Nacional	Loan until December 2018	July 11, 2018	

=== Draft picks ===
Round	#	Position	Player	College	Reference
1 (16)	-	MF	(United States) Brian White	Duke	
2 (31)	-	DF	(United States) Niko de Vera	Akron	
2 (39)	-	FW	(United States) Tom Barlow	Wisconsin	
4 (83)	-	MF	(United States) Jared Stroud	Colgate	
4 (85)	-	FW	(Spain) Jose Aguinaga	Rider	

== Preseason and Friendlies ==
=== Preseason ===
January 27	South Florida Bulls	0–7	New York Red Bulls	Tampa, Florida
10:30 a.m. EST		Report	Wright-Phillips 6'; Royer 16'; Mines 54'; Barlow 64'; Cásseres 67'; Etienne 86'; Bezecourt 88'	Stadium: Corbett Soccer Stadium
Note: Three 30-minute periods.

January 31	New York Red Bulls	3–4	New England Revolution	Bradenton, Florida
10:30 a.m. EST	Muyl 11'; Wright-Phillips 13'; Rivas 76'	Report	Wright 32'; Penilla 39'; Rowe 61' (pen.); Femi 70'	Stadium: IMG Academy

January 31	St. Petersburg Kickers	1–3	New York Red Bulls	Bradenton, Florida
	N/A	Report	White; Scarlett; Mines	Stadium: IMG Academy
Note: 45-minute scrimmage.

February 3	Philadelphia Union	3–4	New York Red Bulls	Clearwater, Florida
10:00 a.m. EST	Sapong 63' (pen.); Burke 116'; Aaronson 125'	Report	Etienne 81'; Muyl 95'; Moreno 119'; Mines 131'	Stadium: Joe DiMaggio Sports Complex
Note: Three 45-minute periods.

February 10	Phoenix Rising FC	2–3	New York Red Bulls	Tempe, Arizona
9:00 p.m. EST	Collin 82' (o.g.); Frater 71'	Report	Muyl 37'; Bezecourt 90'; Escobar 90+1'	Stadium: Phoenix Rising FC Soccer Complex; Attendance: 6,620

February 14	New York Red Bulls	1–1	Sporting Kansas City	Tucson, Arizona
7:00 p.m. EST	Wright-Phillips 15'	Report	Hernandez 77'	Stadium: Kino Sports Complex

February 17	New York Red Bulls	0–5	Houston Dynamo	Tucson, Arizona
8:15PM EST		Report	García 30'; Wenger 40'; Manotas 55'; Steeves 78', 83'	Stadium: Kino Sports Complex
Note: Red Bulls II Squad.

February 21	Portland Timbers	4–1	New York Red Bulls	Tucson, Arizona
4:00 p.m. EST	Polo 10'; Armenteros 12'; Arboleda 60'; Cascante 90'		Andriuškevičius 68' (o.g.)	Stadium: Kino Sports Complex
Note: Red Bulls II Squad.

February 24	Phoenix Rising FC	2–1	New York Red Bulls	Tempe, Arizona
4:00 p.m. EST	Forbes 28'; Drogba 55' (pen.)	Report	White 65'	Stadium: Phoenix Rising FC Soccer Complex
Note: Red Bulls II Squad.

== Major League Soccer season ==
=== Eastern Conference ===
Pos	Team	Pld	W	L	T	GF	GA	GD	Pts	Qualification
1	New York Red Bulls	34	22	7	5	62	33	+29	71	MLS Cup Conference Semifinals
2	Atlanta United FC	34	21	7	6	70	44	+26	69	MLS Cup Conference Semifinals
3	New York City FC	34	16	10	8	59	45	+14	56	MLS Cup Knockout Round
4	D.C. United	34	14	11	9	60	50	+10	51	MLS Cup Knockout Round
5	Columbus Crew	34	14	11	9	43	45	−2	51	MLS Cup Knockout Round
6	Philadelphia Union	34	15	14	5	49	50	−1	50	MLS Cup Knockout Round
7	Montreal Impact	34	14	16	4	47	53	−6	46	
8	New England Revolution	34	10	13	11	49	55	−6	41	
9	Toronto FC	34	10	18	6	59	64	−5	36	
10	Chicago Fire	34	8	18	8	48	61	−13	32	
11	Orlando City SC	34	8	22	4	43	74	−31	28	

Source: MLS

=== Overall ===
Pos	Team	Pld	W	L	T	GF	GA	GD	Pts	Qualification
1	New York Red Bulls (S)	34	22	7	5	62	33	+29	71	CONCACAF Champions League
2	Atlanta United FC (C)	34	21	7	6	70	44	+26	69	CONCACAF Champions League
3	Sporting Kansas City	34	18	8	8	65	40	+25	62	CONCACAF Champions League
4	Seattle Sounders FC	34	18	11	5	52	37	+15	59	

Source: MLS
Rules for classification: 1) points; 2) total wins; 3) total goal differential; 4) total goals scored; 5) disciplinary points; 6) away goals scored; 7) away goal differential; 8) coin toss or drawing of lots
(C) MLS Cup Champion; (S) Supporters' Shield

=== Results summary ===
Overall								Home						Away					
Pld	W	D	L	GF	GA	GD	Pts	W	D	L	GF	GA	GD	W	D	L	GF	GA	GD
34	22	5	7	62	32	+30	71	14	1	2	36	9	+27	8	4	5	26	23	+3

Last updated: October 28, 2018.
Source: MLS

=== Matches ===
March 10 1	New York Red Bulls	4–0	Portland Timbers	Harrison, New Jersey
7:00 p.m. EST	Mines 18'; Wright-Phillips 77'; Rivas 80', 90+3'	Report		Stadium: Red Bull Arena; Attendance: 18,374; Referee: Allen Chapman

March 17 2	Real Salt Lake	1–0	New York Red Bulls	Sandy, Utah
9:00 p.m. EST	Rusnák 4' (pen.)	Report		Stadium: Rio Tinto Stadium; Attendance: 16,334; Referee: Ted Unkel

March 24 3	New York Red Bulls	3–0	Minnesota United FC	Harrison, New Jersey
7:00 p.m. EST	Muyl 15'; Wright-Phillips 42', 78'	Report		Stadium: Red Bull Arena; Attendance: 14,768

March 31 4	Orlando City SC	4–3	New York Red Bulls	Orlando, Florida
1:00 p.m. EST	Johnson 15'; Dwyer 26', 48'; Sutter 86'	Report	Valot 7'; Etienne 24'; Long 82'	Stadium: Orlando City Stadium; Attendance: 23,257

April 14 5	New York Red Bulls	3–1	Montreal Impact	Harrison, New Jersey
1:00 p.m. EST	Wright-Phillips 5'; Gamarra 57'; Murillo 76'	Report	Vargas 33'	Stadium: Red Bull Arena; Attendance: 15,017

April 21 6	New York Red Bulls	1–2	Chicago Fire	Harrison, New Jersey
3:30 p.m. EST	Wright-Phillips 81'	Report	Katai 30'; Nikolić 69' (pen.)	Stadium: Red Bull Arena; Attendance: 18,784; Referee: Robert Sibiga

April 28 7	LA Galaxy	2–3	New York Red Bulls	Carson, California
10:30 p.m. EST	Kamara 59'; G. dos Santos 66'	Report	Royer 7'; Valot 49'; Gamarra 84' (pen.)	Stadium: StubHub Center; Referee: 26,704

May 5 8	New York Red Bulls	4–0	New York City FC	Harrison, New Jersey
2:00 p.m. EST	Gamarra 2'; Valot 4'; Wright-Phillips 35'; Etienne 79'	Report		Stadium: Red Bull Arena; Attendance: 25,219

May 12 9	Colorado Rapids	1–2	New York Red Bulls	Commerce City, Colorado
9:00 p.m. EST	McBean 85'	Report	Royer 5'; Etienne 76'	Stadium: Dick's Sporting Goods Park; Attendance: 15,691

May 20 10	Atlanta United FC	1–3	New York Red Bulls	Atlanta
7:00 p.m. EST	Barco 26'; Garza (red card) 71'	Report	Royer 42' (pen.); Wright-Phillips 51', 55'	Stadium: Mercedes-Benz Stadium; Attendance: 45,089

May 26 11	New York Red Bulls	0–0	Philadelphia Union	Harrison, New Jersey
7:00 p.m. EST		Report		Stadium: Red Bull Arena; Attendance: 17,814

June 2 12	New England Revolution	2–1	New York Red Bulls	Foxborough, Massachusetts
7:30 p.m. EST	Fagúndez 45+1'; Bunbury 78'	Report	Wright-Phillips 8'	Stadium: Gillette Stadium; Attendance: 21,576

June 9 13	Columbus Crew	1–1	New York Red Bulls	Columbus, Ohio
5:00 p.m. EST	Zardes 26'	Report	Muyl 57'	Stadium: Mapfre Stadium; Attendance: 11,246

June 13 14	New York Red Bulls	2–1	Seattle Sounders FC	Harrison, New Jersey
8:00 p.m. EST	Royer 37'; Wright-Phillips 52'	Report	Shipp 87'	Stadium: Red Bull Arena; Attendance: 15,553

June 23 15	New York Red Bulls	3–0	FC Dallas	Harrison, New Jersey
6:00 p.m. EST	Wright-Phillips 23'; Royer (red card) 27'; Long 39'; Lawrence 48'	Report	Ziegler (red card) 90'	Stadium: Red Bull Arena; Attendance: 20,827

July 1 16	Toronto FC	0–1	New York Red Bulls	Toronto
4:30 p.m. EST		Report	Lawrence 4'	Stadium: BMO Field; Attendance: 26,363

July 8 17	New York City FC	1–0	New York Red Bulls	New York, New York
7:00 p.m. EST	Moralez 85'	Report		Stadium: Yankee Stadium; Attendance: 30,027

July 14 18	New York Red Bulls	3–2	Sporting Kansas City	Harrison, New Jersey
7:00 p.m. EST	Wright-Phillips 4'; Rzatkowski 72', 79'	Report	Russell 8'; Espinoza 51'	Stadium: Red Bull Arena; Attendance: 16,793

July 21 19	New York Red Bulls	2–0	New England Revolution	Harrison, New Jersey
7:00 p.m. EST	Royer 69'; Wright-Phillips 80'	Report		Stadium: Red Bull Arena; Attendance: 16,027

July 25 20	D.C. United	0–1	New York Red Bulls	Washington, D.C.
7:30 p.m. EST		Report	Wright-Phillips 2'	Stadium: Audi Field; Attendance: 15,655

July 28 21	New York Red Bulls	2–3	Columbus Crew	Harrison, New Jersey
7:00 p.m. EST	Mensah 50' (o.g.); Royer 69'	Report	Mensah 7'; Mullins 24'; Davis 31' (o.g.)	Stadium: Red Bull Arena; Attendance: 16,459

August 5 22	New York Red Bulls	2–1	Los Angeles FC	Harrison, New Jersey
6:00 p.m. EST	Royer 39', 80'	Report	Rossi 53'	Stadium: Red Bull Arena; Attendance: 20,402

August 11 23	Chicago Fire	0–1	New York Red Bulls	Bridgeview, Illinois
8:30 p.m. EST		Report	Wright-Phillips 55'	Stadium: Toyota Park; Attendance: 18,064

August 18 24	Vancouver Whitecaps FC	2–2	New York Red Bulls	Vancouver, British Columbia
7:00 p.m. EST	Waston 42', 60'	Report	Royer 5', 90'; Murillo (red card) 84'	Stadium: BC Place; Attendance: 22,120

August 22 25	New York City FC	1–1	New York Red Bulls	New York, New York
7:00 p.m. EST	Amagat (red card) 40'; Villa 52'; Ofori (red card) 73'	Report	Wright-Phillips 37'	Stadium: Yankee Stadium; Attendance: 30,139

August 26 26	New York Red Bulls	1–0	D.C. United	Harrison, New Jersey
7:00 p.m. EST	Gamarra 56'	Report		Stadium: Red Bull Arena; Attendance: 22,324; Referee: David Gantar

August 29 27	New York Red Bulls	1–0	Houston Dynamo	Harrison, New Jersey
8:00 p.m. EST	White 55'	Report		Stadium: Red Bull Arena; Attendance: 15,042; Referee: Robert Sibiga

September 1 28	Montreal Impact	3–0	New York Red Bulls	Montreal, Quebec
7:00 p.m. EST	Fanni 30'; Sagna 38'; Piatti 90+3'	Report		Stadium: Stade Saputo; Attendance: 18,458

September 16 29	D.C. United	3–3	New York Red Bulls	Washington, D.C.
1:00 p.m. EST	Arriola 25'; Rooney 64'; Acosta 87'		Wright-Phillips 41', 76', 90'	Stadium: Audi Field; Attendance: 18,331

September 22 30	New York Red Bulls	2–0	Toronto FC	Harrison, New Jersey
5:00 p.m. EST	Gamarra 70'; Etienne 90+3'	Report		Stadium: Red Bull Arena; Attendance: 20,731

September 30 31	New York Red Bulls	2–0	Atlanta United FC	Harrison, New Jersey
1:00 p.m. EST	Royer 39' (pen.); Parker 74'	Report		Stadium: Red Bull Arena; Attendance: 22,057; Referee: Robert Sibiga

October 6 32	San Jose Earthquakes	1–3	New York Red Bulls	San Jose, California
10:30 p.m. EST	Wondolowski 83'	Report	Muyl 29'; Wright-Phillips 32'; Long 50'	Stadium: Avaya Stadium; Attendance: 17,241; Referee: Baldomero Toledo

October 21 33	Philadelphia Union	0–1	New York Red Bulls	Chester, Pennsylvania
3:00 p.m. EST		Report	Gamarra 69' (pen.)	Stadium: Talen Energy Stadium; Attendance: 18,021; Referee: Ted Unkel

October 28 34	New York Red Bulls	1–0	Orlando City SC	Harrison, New Jersey
4:30 p.m. EST	Etienne 53'	Report		Stadium: Red Bull Arena; Attendance: 20,023

=== MLS Cup Playoffs ===
==== Conference semifinals ====
November 4 First Leg	Columbus Crew	1–0	New York Red Bulls	Columbus, Ohio
3:00 p.m. EST	Zardes 61'	Report		Stadium: MAPFRE Stadium; Attendance: 12,892; Referee: Nima Saghafi

November 11 Second leg	New York Red Bulls	3–0 (3–1 agg.)	Columbus Crew	Harrison, New Jersey
7:30 p.m. EST	Muyl 17'; Royer 73', 76'	Report		Stadium: Red Bull Arena; Attendance: 22,789; Referee: Alan Kelly

==== Conference Finals ====
November 25 First Leg	Atlanta United FC	3–0	New York Red Bulls	Atlanta, Georgia
5:00 p.m. EST	Martínez 32'; Escobar 71'; Villalba 90+5'	Report		Stadium: Mercedes-Benz Stadium; Attendance: 70,016; Referee: Kevin Stott

November 29 Second Leg	New York Red Bulls	1–0 (1–3 agg.)	Atlanta United FC	Harrison, New Jersey
7:00 PM EST	Parker 90+4'	Report		Stadium: Red Bull Arena; Attendance: 22,137; Referee: Jair Marrufo

== CONCACAF Champions League ==
=== Round of 16 ===
February 22 First Leg	Olimpia (Honduras)	1–1	(United States) New York Red Bulls	San José, Costa Rica
10:00 p.m. EST	Moya 73' (pen.)	Report	Royer 31'	Stadium: Estadio Nacional; Attendance: 0 Referee: John Pitti (Panama)
Note: Game was played in Costa Rica and behind closed doors due to the political situation in Honduras.

March 1 Second Leg	New York Red Bulls (United States)	2–0 (3–1 agg.)	(Honduras) Olimpia	Harrison, New Jersey
8:00 p.m. EST	Wright-Phillips 54'; Davis 64'	Report		Stadium: Red Bull Arena; Attendance: 11,677; Referee: Ricardo Montero (Costa Rica)

=== Quarter-finals ===
March 6 First Leg	Tijuana (Mexico)	0–2	(United States) New York Red Bulls	Tijuana, Mexico
10:00 p.m. EST		Report	Wright-Phillips 9', 67'	Stadium: Estadio Caliente; Attendance: 22,000; Referee: Kimbell Ward (Saint Kitts and Nevis)

March 13 Second Leg	New York Red Bulls (United States)	3–1 (5–1 agg.)	(Mexico) Tijuana	Harrison, New Jersey
8:00 p.m. EST	Adams 28'; Rzatkowski 70'; Gamarra 76'	Report	Mendoza 10'	Stadium: Red Bull Arena; Attendance: 6,393; Referee: Melvin Matamoros (Honduras)

=== Semi-finals ===
April 4 First Leg	Guadalajara (Mexico)	1–0	(United States) New York Red Bulls	Zapopan, Mexico
10:00 p.m. EST	Brizuela 26'	Report	Collin (red card) 73'	Stadium: Estadio Akron; Attendance: 46,232

April 10 Second Leg	New York Red Bulls (United States)	0–0 (0–1 agg.)	(Mexico) Guadalajara	Harrison, New Jersey
8:00 p.m. EST		Report		Stadium: Red Bull Arena; Attendance: 23,623

== U.S. Open Cup ==
New York entered the 2018 U.S. Open Cup with the rest of Major League Soccer in the fourth round.

June 6 Fourth round	New York Red Bulls	4–0	New York City FC	Harrison, New Jersey
7:30 PM EDT	Bezecourt 2'; Long 52'; Royer 87', 89'	Report		Stadium: Red Bull Arena; Attendance: 9,496; Referee: Fotis Bazakos

June 16 Round of 16	Philadelphia Union	2–1	New York Red Bulls	Chester, Pennsylvania
7:00 PM EDT	Medunjanin 52'; Burke 61'	Report	Wright-Phillips 77'	Stadium: Talen Energy Stadium

== Player statistics ==
As of November 29, 2018.

No.	Pos	Nat	Player	Total		MLS		MLS Cup		U.S. Open Cup		Champions League	
No.	Pos	Nat	Player	Apps	Goals	Apps	Goals	Apps	Goals	Apps	Goals	Apps	Goals
Goalkeepers
18	GK	(United States) USA	Ryan Meara	4	-3	3	-3	0	0	1	0	0	0
24	GK	(United States) USA	Evan Louro	0	0	0	0	0	0	0	0	0	0
31	GK	(United States) USA	Luis Robles	41	-39	31	-30	3	-4	1	-2	6	-3
Defenders
3	DF	(United States) USA	Kevin Politz	0	0	0	0	0	0	0	0	0	0
5	DF	(United States) USA	Connor Lade	26	0	15+6	0	2	0	1+1	0	0+1	0
6	DF	(United States) USA	Kyle Duncan	4	0	4	0	0	0	0	0	0	0
21	DF	(United States) USA	Tommy Redding	1	0	1	0	0	0	0	0	0	0
26	DF	(United States) USA	Tim Parker	38	2	29	1	4	1	1	0	4	0
29	DF	(Panama) PAN	Fidel Escobar	6	0	4+2	0	0	0	0	0	0	0
33	DF	(United States) USA	Aaron Long	45	4	31+3	3	4	0	1	1	6	0
41	DF	(United States) USA	Ethan Kutler	5	0	1+3	0	0	0	1	0	0	0
47	DF	(Cameroon) CMR	Hassan Ndam	3	0	1	0	0	0	2	0	0	0
62	DF	(Panama) PAN	Michael Amir Murillo	33	1	21+2	1	4	0	0	0	6	0
78	DF	(France) FRA	Aurélien Collin	13	0	5+2	0	0	0	1+1	0	4	0
92	DF	(Jamaica) JAM	Kemar Lawrence	38	2	27+1	2	2	0	2	0	6	0
Midfielders
4	MF	(United States) USA	Tyler Adams	38	1	26+1	0	4	0	1	0	6	1
7	MF	(Haiti) HAI	Derrick Etienne	41	5	9+21	5	0+4	0	2	0	1+4	0
9	MF	(Romania) ROU	Andreas Ivan	11	0	1+8	0	0+2	0	0	0	0	0
10	MF	(Paraguay) PAR	Alejandro Romero Gamarra	38	7	29+1	6	4	0	1	0	0+3	1
17	MF	(United States) USA	Ben Mines	1	1	1	1	0	0	0	0	0	0
19	MF	(United States) USA	Alex Muyl	40	4	13+17	3	4	1	1	0	5	0
22	MF	(France) FRA	Florian Valot	20	3	13+1	3	0	0	0+2	0	2+2	0
23	MF	(Venezuela) VEN	Cristian Cásseres	3	0	1+2	0	0	0	0	0	0	0
27	MF	(United States) USA	Sean Davis	42	1	30+2	0	4	0	1	0	5	1
77	MF	(Austria) AUT	Daniel Royer	41	16	24+5	11	4	2	1+1	2	6	1
88	MF	(France) FRA	Vincent Bezecourt	10	1	5+4	0	0	0	1	1	0	0
90	MF	(Germany) GER	Marc Rzatkowski	33	3	16+8	2	0+3	0	2	0	2+2	1
	MF	(Ivory Coast) CIV	Jean-Christophe Koffi	0	0	0+0	0	0	0	0	0	0	0
Forwards
16	FW	(Cameroon) CMR	Anatole Abang	0	0	0+0	0	0	0	0	0	0	0
42	FW	(United States) USA	Brian White	6	1	2+3	1	0+1	0	0	0	0	0
99	FW	(England) ENG	Bradley Wright-Phillips	43	24	28+4	20	4	0	1	1	6	3
Left Club During Season
8	MF	(Brazil) BRA	Felipe	1	0	0	0	0	0	0	0	1	0
11	FW	(Colombia) COL	Carlos Rivas	10	2	3+2	2	0	0	1	0	0+4	0
25	FW	(United States) USA	Stefano Bonomo	1	0	0+1	0	0	0	0	0	0	0

=== Top scorers ===
Place	Position	Number	Name	MLS	MLS Cup	U.S. Open Cup	Champions League	Total
1	FW	99	(England) Bradley Wright-Phillips	20	0	1	3	24
2	MF	77	(Austria) Daniel Royer	11	2	2	1	16
3	MF	10	(Paraguay) Alejandro Romero Gamarra	6	0	0	1	7
4	MF	7	(Haiti) Derrick Etienne	5	0	0	0	5
5	MF	19	(United States) Alex Muyl	3	1	0	0	4
5	DF	33	(United States) Aaron Long	3	0	1	0	4
6	MF	22	(France) Florian Valot	3	0	0	0	3
6	MF	90	(Germany) Marc Rzatkowski	2	0	0	1	3
7	FW	11	(Colombia) Carlos Rivas (Note: Players who left New York that have appeared this season.)	2	0	0	0	2
7	DF	26	(United States) Tim Parker	1	1	0	0	2
7	DF	92	(Jamaica) Kemar Lawrence	2	0	0	0	2
8	MF	4	(United States) Tyler Adams	0	0	0	1	1
8	MF	17	(United States) Ben Mines	1	0	0	0	1
8	MF	27	(United States) Sean Davis	0	0	0	1	1
8	FW	42	(United States) Brian White	1	0	0	0	1
8	DF	62	(Panama) Michael Amir Murillo	1	0	0	0	1
8	MF	88	(France) Vincent Bezecourt	0	0	1	0	1
Own goals				1	0	0	0	1
Total				62	4	5	8	79

As of November 29, 2018.

=== Assist Leaders ===
Place	Position	Number	Name	MLS	MLS Cup	U.S. Open Cup	Champions League	Total
1	MF	10	(Paraguay) Alejandro Romero Gamarra	10	1	1	0	12
2	FW	99	(England) Bradley Wright-Phillips	7	0	0	3	10
3	MF	19	(United States) Alex Muyl	5	0	1	0	6
4	MF	4	(United States) Tyler Adams	3	1	0	1	5
4	MF	22	(France) Florian Valot	4	0	0	1	5
5	MF	27	(United States) Sean Davis	4	0	0	0	4
5	DF	62	(Panama) Michael Amir Murillo	3	0	0	1	4
5	MF	90	(Germany) Marc Rzatkowski	3	0	1	0	4
6	MF	77	(Austria) Daniel Royer	2	1	0	0	3
7	DF	26	(United States) Tim Parker	2	0	0	0	2
7	DF	33	(United States) Aaron Long	1	1	0	0	2
7	DF	92	(Jamaica) Kemar Lawrence	1	0	1	0	2
8	DF	5	(United States) Connor Lade	1	0	0	0	1
8	DF	6	(United States) Kyle Duncan	1	0	0	0	1
8	DF	41	(United States) Ethan Kutler	1	0	0	0	1
8	MF	88	(France) Vincent Bezecourt	1	0	0	0	1
Total				48	4	4	6	62

As of November 29, 2018.
This table does not include secondary assists.

=== Shutouts ===
Place	Position	Number	Name	MLS	MLS Cup	U.S. Open Cup	Champions League	Total
1	GK	31	(United States) Luis Robles	14	2	0	3	19
2	GK	18	(United States) Ryan Meara	1	0	1	0	2
Total				15	2	1	3	21

As of November 29, 2018.

=== Disciplinary record ===
No.	Pos.	Nat.	Player	MLS		MLS Cup		U.S. Open Cup		Champions League		Total	
No.	Pos.	Nat.	Player	Booked	Sent off (straight red)	Booked	Sent off (straight red)	Booked	Sent off (straight red)	Booked	Sent off (straight red)	Booked	Sent off (straight red)
4	MF	(United States)	Tyler Adams	3	0	0	0	0	0	1	0	4	0
5	DF	(United States)	Connor Lade	3	0	0	0	0	0	0	0	3	0
7	MF	(Haiti)	Derrick Etienne	1	0	0	0	0	0	1	0	2	0
8	MF	(Brazil)	Felipe (Note: Players who left New York that have appeared this season.)	0	0	0	0	0	0	1	0	1	0
9	MF	(Romania)	Andreas Ivan	3	0	0	0	0	0	0	0	3	0
10	MF	(Paraguay)	Alejandro Romero Gamarra	5	0	0	0	0	0	0	0	5	0
17	MF	(United States)	Ben Mines	1	0	0	0	0	0	0	0	1	0
18	GK	(United States)	Ryan Meara	1	0	0	0	0	0	0	0	1	0
19	MF	(United States)	Alex Muyl	6	0	0	0	0	0	2	0	8	0
22	MF	(France)	Florian Valot	1	0	0	0	0	0	0	0	1	0
23	MF	(Venezuela)	Cristian Cásseres	1	0	0	0	0	0	0	0	1	0
26	DF	(United States)	Tim Parker	5	0	1	0	0	0	0	0	6	0
27	MF	(United States)	Sean Davis	1	0	1	0	1	0	2	0	5	0
31	GK	(United States)	Luis Robles	1	0	0	0	0	0	1	0	2	0
33	DF	(United States)	Aaron Long	1	0	0	0	0	0	0	0	1	0
62	DF	(Panama)	Michael Amir Murillo	5	1	0	0	0	0	1	0	6	1
77	MF	(Austria)	Daniel Royer	1	1	0	0	0	0	1	0	2	1
78	DF	(France)	Aurélien Collin	2	0	0	0	0	0	2	1	4	1
88	MF	(France)	Vincent Bezecourt	1	0	0	0	0	0	0	0	1	0
90	MF	(Germany)	Marc Rzatkowski	4	0	0	0	0	0	0	0	4	0
92	DF	(Jamaica)	Kemar Lawrence	1	0	0	0	0	0	1	0	2	0
99	FW	(England)	Bradley Wright-Phillips	7	0	0	0	0	0	0	0	7	0
Totals				54	2	2	0	1	0	13	1	70	3

As of November 29, 2018.
