= Ben Mines =

American soccer player (born 2000)

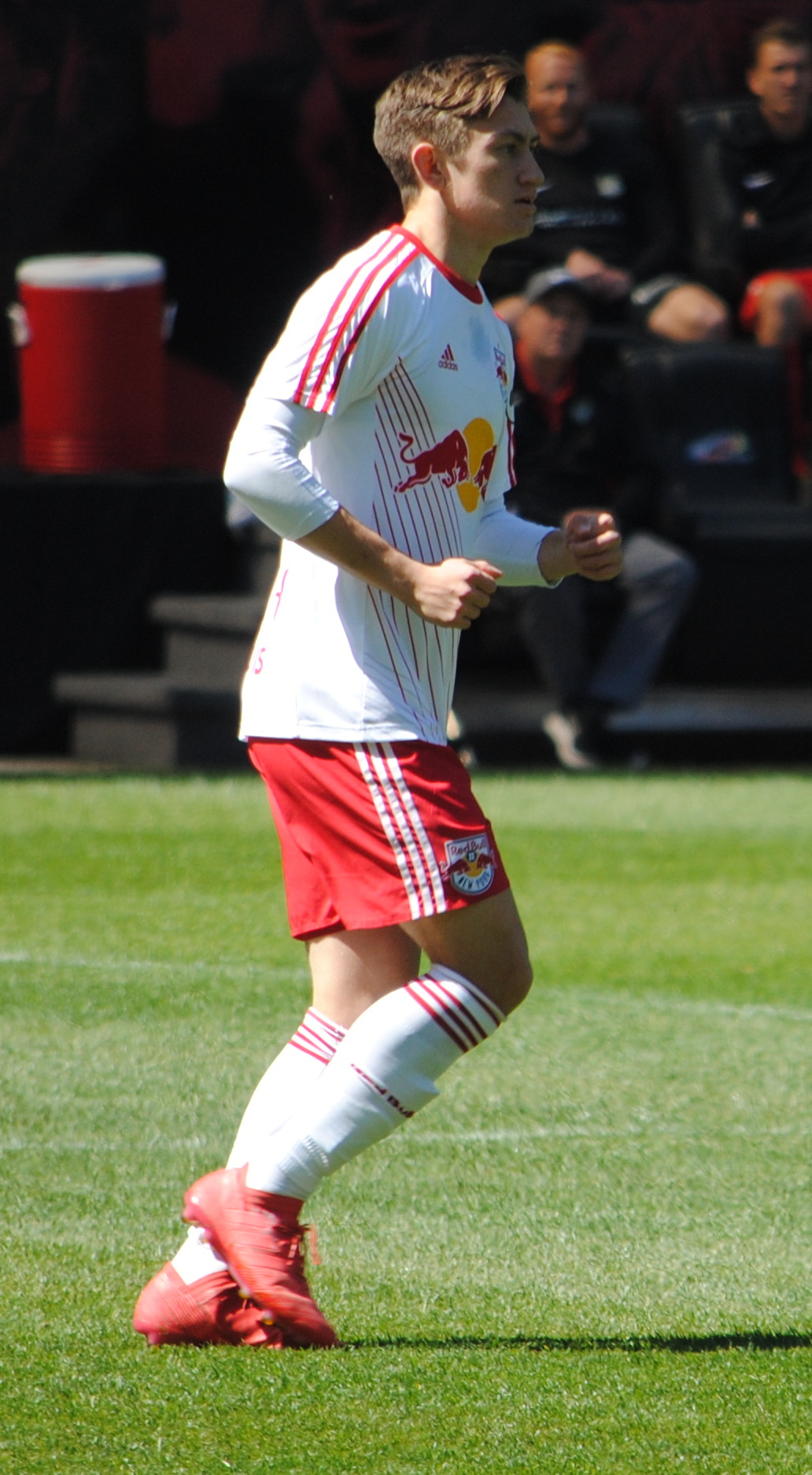

Personal information
- Date of birth: May 13, 2000 (age 26)
- Place of birth: Ridgefield, Connecticut, United States
- Height: 5 ft 9 in (1.75 m)
- Position: Midfielder

Team information
- Current team: Las Vegas Lights
- Number: 7

Youth career
- 2015–2018: New York Red Bulls

Senior career*
Years	Team	Apps	(Gls)
2016–2020	New York Red Bulls II	47	(2)
2018–2020	New York Red Bulls	6	(2)
2021–2022	FC Cincinnati	0	(0)
2021	→ Orange County SC (loan)	11	(3)
2022	→ Colorado Springs Switchbacks (loan)	3	(1)
2023–2024	Miami FC	26	(1)
2024	Indy Eleven	20	(0)
2025	Loudoun United	25	(3)
2026–	Las Vegas Lights	13	(0)
2026	→ Hartford Athletic (loan)	5	(0)
- * Club domestic league appearances and goals as of November 4, 2026

Benjamin Mines (born May 13, 2000) is an American soccer player who plays as a midfielder for Las Vegas Lights FC in the USL Championship.

== Youth soccer ==
Mines joined the New York Red Bulls Academy in 2015, playing for the U-16 side during the 2015–16 season. He also appeared for United Soccer League side New York Red Bulls II in 2016, signing on an amateur contract. He made his debut for New York Red Bulls II on August 19, 2016, coming on as a second-half substitute for Junior Flemmings in a 1–0 victory over Louisville City FC. Mines remained with Red Bulls II under an amateur contract during the 2017 season, making his season debut in a 3–3 draw against Pittsburgh Riverhounds. On May 20, 2017, Mines scored his first goal for the club in a 4–3 loss to Ottawa Fury FC. On October 22, 2017, Mines scored for New York in a 4–0 victory over Charleston Battery in the 2017 USL Playoffs.

== Professional career ==
On January 8, 2018, it was announced that Mines had signed his first professional contract with New York Red Bulls. On March 10, 2018, he scored on his MLS debut in a 4–0 victory over Portland Timbers.

On March 15, 2018, the New York Red Bulls entered into a loan agreement with New York Red Bulls II, and Mines was listed on the Red Bulls II 2018 USL season roster. On March 31, 2018, Mines scored his first goal of the season for New York Red Bulls II in a 5–2 victory over Charleston Battery.

Mines was released by New York on November 30, 2020.

FC Cincinnati selected Ben Mines with the first selection of the 2020 End-of-Year Waivers Draft on December 16, 2020 On December 30, 2020, it was announced Mines and Cincinnati had agreed terms ahead of their 2021 season. On August 16, 2021, Mines was loaned to USL Championship side Orange County SC.

On March 9, 2022, Mines signed on a season-long loan with USL Championship side Colorado Springs Switchbacks.

Mines was released by Cincinnati following their 2022 season.

On December 29, 2022, it was announced that Mines had joined USL Championship side Miami FC on a multi-year deal from 2023 onward.

Mines joined USL Championship side Indy Eleven on April 11, 2024, as part of a swap deal. He made his debut for the Indianapolis-based club in a 4–2 home defeat to Charleston Battery on April 13, replacing team captain Tyler Gibson in the 79th minute. Mines was released by the team following the 2024 season.

Mines joined USL Championship team Loudoun United FC on a one-year contract on March 7, 2025, ahead of the 2025 season. He made his debut for the club a day later on March 8, replacing forward Abdellatif Aboukoura in the 64th minute in a 3–1 away victory over Birmingham Legion FC. Mines made 33 total appearances for Loudoun, scoring 4 goals and making 10 assists over 33 total appearances. He contract expired with Loudoun following the end of the 2025 season.

USL Championship team Las Vegas Lights FC announced the signing of Mines on December 19, 2025, ahead of their 2026 season. In September 2026, Hartford Athletic acquired Mines on loan from Las Vegas for the remainder of the 2026 USL Championship season.

== Career statistics ==
As of match played November 1, 2025

Club	Season	League			League Cup		Domestic Cup		Playoffs		Total	
Club	Season	Division	Apps	Goals	Apps	Goals	Apps	Goals	Apps	Goals	Apps	Goals
New York Red Bulls II	2016	USL Championship	5	0	—		—		0	0	5	0
New York Red Bulls II	2017	USL Championship	7	1	—		—		4	1	11	2
New York Red Bulls II	2018	USL Championship	14	1	—		—		0	0	14	1
New York Red Bulls II	2019	USL Championship	20	0	—		—		1	0	21	0
New York Red Bulls II	2020	USL Championship	1	1	—		—		0	0	1	1
New York Red Bulls II	Total		47	3	0	0	0	0	5	1	52	4
New York Red Bulls	2018	Major League Soccer	1	1	—		0	0	0	0	1	1
New York Red Bulls	2019	Major League Soccer	0	0	—		0	0	0	0	0	0
New York Red Bulls	2020	Major League Soccer	5	1	—		—		0	0	5	1
New York Red Bulls	Total		6	2	0	0	0	0	0	0	6	2
FC Cincinnati	2021	Major League Soccer	0	0	—		—		0	0	0	0
FC Cincinnati	2022	Major League Soccer	0	0	—		0	0	0	0	0	0
FC Cincinnati	Total		0	0	0	0	0	0	0	0	0	0
Orange County SC (loan)	2021	USL Championship	11	3	—		—		3	0	14	3
Colorado Springs Switchbacks FC (loan)	2022	USL Championship	3	1	—		0	0	0	0	3	1
Miami FC	2023	USL Championship	22	1	—		1	0	0	0	23	1
Miami FC	2024	USL Championship	4	0	0	0	0	0	0	0	4	0
Miami FC	Total		26	1	0	0	1	0	0	0	27	1
Indy Eleven	2024	USL Championship	20	0	0	0	4	0	0	0	24	0
Loudoun United FC	2025	USL Championship	25	3	4	0	3	1	1	0	33	4
Career total			138	13	4	0	8	1	9	1	159	15

== Honors ==
New York Red Bulls

- MLS Supporters' Shield: 2018

Orange County SC

- USL Cup: 2021
