= Hassan Ndam =

Cameroonian footballer (born 1998)

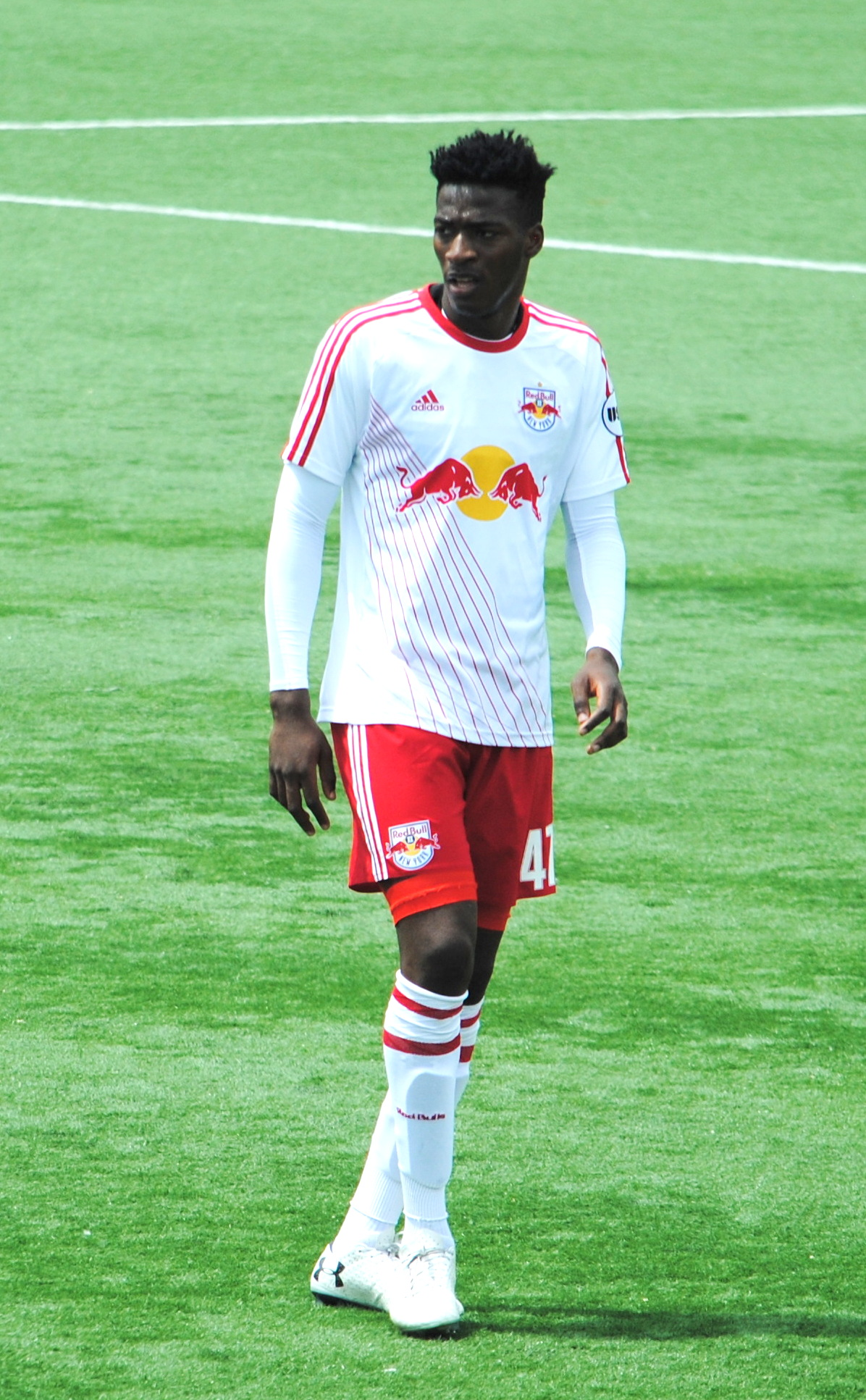

Personal information
- Date of birth: 29 October 1998 (age 28)
- Place of birth: Foumban, Cameroon
- Height: 1.93 m (6 ft 4 in)
- Position: Centre-back

Team information
- Current team: Vendsyssel
- Number: 5

Youth career
- Rainbow Bamenda

Senior career*
Years	Team	Apps	(Gls)
2016	Rainbow Bamenda	0	(0)
2017–2018	New York Red Bulls	2	(0)
2017–2018	New York Red Bulls II	52	(3)
2019–2020	FC Cincinnati	0	(0)
2019	→ Charlotte Independence (loan)	5	(0)
2020	→ Miami FC (loan)	14	(0)
2022	Orange County SC	2	(0)
2022–2023	New York Red Bulls II	12	(0)
2022–2023	New York Red Bulls	17	(0)
2024	Haka	22	(0)
2025–	Vendsyssel	16	(0)

International career
- Cameroon U17
- Cameroon U20
- * Club domestic league appearances and goals as of 18 June 2026

Hassan Ndam (born 29 October 1998) is a Cameroonian professional footballer who plays as a centre-back for Danish 2nd Division side Vendsyssel FF.

== Club career ==
=== Rainbow Bamenda ===
Born in Foumban, Ndam began his professional career with Rainbow Bamenda.

=== New York Red Bulls ===
Ndam signed with Major League Soccer side New York Red Bulls from Rainbow Bamenda on 31 January 2017. He made his debut with New York Red Bulls II on 25 March 2017, in a 3–3 draw against Pittsburgh Riverhounds. On 19 August 2017, Ndam scored his first goal as a professional, heading in a free kick in 4–0 victory over FC Cincinnati. In his first year as a professional Ndam made 27 appearances with Red Bulls II scoring 1 goal, being regarded as one of the top young prospects in the league.

On 22 July 2017 Ndam made his debut with the Red Bulls first team, appearing as a late game substitute in a 3–0 victory over Minnesota United. Ndam made his first start for the first team on 6 June 2018, in the team's 4–0 derby win over New York City FC in the fourth round of the 2018 U.S. Open Cup. A few days later, on 9 June, Ndam made his first league start for New York in a 1–1 draw at Columbus Crew. On 6 July 2018, Ndam scored his first goal of the season for New York Red Bulls II in a 6–1 victory over Atlanta United 2.

=== FC Cincinnati ===
On 11 December 2018, Ndam was selected by FC Cincinnati in the 2018 MLS Expansion Draft. On May 1, 2019, Ndam was loaned to the Charlotte Independence for the remainder of the USL Championship season.

On 1 February 2020, Ndam was loaned to Miami FC for the 2020 USL Championship season. While with Miami, Ndam was a regular starter making 14 league appearances.

He was released by Cincinnati at the end of their 2020 season.

=== Orange County SC ===
On 10 June 2022, Ndam signed a 25-day short-term contract with USL Championship side Orange County SC.

=== Return to New York Red Bulls ===
On 14 July 2022, New York Red Bulls II announced that they had signed Ndam. Ndam became a regular starter for New York Red Bulls II, and on 3 September 2022, Ndam was signed to the club's MLS roster. On 9 May 2023, Ndam appeared as a starter for New York in 1–0 victory over rival DC United, helping his side advance to the quarterfinals of the 2023 U.S. Open Cup.

On 22 November 2023, the Red Bulls announced that they had mutually parted ways with Ndam.

=== FC Haka ===
On 20 December 2023, Finnish side Haka announced that Ndam would join the club at the start of the 2024 season, having signed a one-year deal, with an option for an additional year.

=== Vendsyssel FF ===
On February 3, 2025, Ndam moved to Denmark, signing a deal until June 2026 with Danish 1st Division side Vendsyssel FF.

== International career ==
Ndam has represented Cameroon at the Under-17 and Under-20 levels.

== Career statistics ==
As of match played 7 October 2025

Appearances and goals by club, season and competition
Club	Season	League			Playoffs (Note: Includes MLS Cup Playoffs)		National Cup (Note: Includes U.S. Open Cup)		Continental		Total	
Club	Season	Division	Apps	Goals	Apps	Goals	Apps	Goals	Apps	Goals	Apps	Goals
New York Red Bulls II	2017	USL Championship	24	1	3	0	—		—		27	1
New York Red Bulls II	2018	USL Championship	28	2	3	0	—		—		31	2
New York Red Bulls II	Total		52	3	6	0	0	0	0	0	58	6
New York Red Bulls	2017	MLS	1	0	0	0	0	0	—		1	0
New York Red Bulls	2018	MLS	1	0	0	0	2	0	—		3	0
New York Red Bulls	Total		2	0	0	0	2	0	0	0	4	0
FC Cincinnati	2019	MLS	0	0	—		0	0	—		0	0
Charlotte Independence (loan)	2019	USL Championship	5	0	0	0	1	0	—		6	0
Miami FC (loan)	2020	USL Championship	14	0	0	0	—		—		14	0
Orange County SC	2022	USL Championship	2	0	0	0	0	0	—		2	0
New York Red Bulls II	2022	USL Championship	6	0	0	0	—		—		6	0
New York Red Bulls II	2023	MLS Next Pro	6	0	0	0	—		—		6	0
New York Red Bulls II	Total		12	0	0	0	0	0	0	0	12	0
New York Red Bulls	2022	MLS	2	0	0	0	0	0	—		2	0
New York Red Bulls	2023	MLS	15	0	0	0	2	0	2	0	19	0
New York Red Bulls	Total		17	0	0	0	2	0	2	0	21	0
Haka	2024	Veikkausliiga	22	0	–		3	0	—		25	0
Vendsyssel FF	2024–25	Danish 1st Division	3	0	–		0	0	–		3	0
Vendsyssel FF	2024–25	Danish 1st Division	6	0	–		1	0	–		7	0
Career total			135	3	6	0	8	0	2	0	152	3

== Honors ==
New York Red Bulls

- MLS Supporters' Shield (1): 2018
