= 2018 New York Red Bulls II season =

New York Red Bulls II
2018 season
- Head coach: John Wolyniec
- Top goalscorer: Amando Moreno (9)
- Highest home attendance: 1,150 (Jun. 9 vs. Charlotte)
- Lowest home attendance: 498 (May 27 vs. Indy Eleven)
- Average home league attendance: 731
Home colors	Away colors

The 2018 New York Red Bulls II season was the club's fourth season of existence, and their third in United Soccer League, the second-tier of the American soccer pyramid. The Red Bulls II played in the Eastern Division of USL.

== Club ==
=== Coaching staff ===
Position	Staff
Head Coach	(United States) John Wolyniec

=== Squad information ===
As of August 4, 2018

Appearances and goals are career totals from all-competitions.

Squad No.	Name	Nationality	Position(s)	Date of birth (age)	Signed from	Games played	Goals scored
Goalkeepers
18	Ryan Meara	(United States)	GK	November 15, 1990 (age 35)	(United States) New York Red Bulls (loan)	31	0
24	Evan Louro	(United States)	GK	January 19, 1996 (age 30)	(United States) New York Red Bulls (loan)	41	0
48	Scott Levene	(United States)	GK	August 31, 1995 (age 31)	(United States) University of Connecticut	3	0
Defenders
3	Kevin Politz	(United States)	CB	March 22, 1996 (age 30)	(United States) New York Red Bulls (loan)	11	0
6	Kyle Duncan	(United States)	RB	December 27, 1997 (age 28)	(United States) New York Red Bulls (loan)	0	0
21	Tommy Redding	(United States)	CB	January 24, 1997 (age 29)	(United States) New York Red Bulls (loan)	2	0
35	Jordan Scarlett	(Jamaica)	CB	July 8, 1995 (age 31)	(United States) Iona College	37	0
37	Allen Yanes	(Guatemala)	LB	July 4, 1997 (age 29)	(Guatemala) Alianza GFC	2	0
38	Wahab Ackwei	(Ghana)	CB	July 8, 1995 (age 31)	(Ghana) International Allies	5	0
40	Niko de Vera	(United States)	LB	July 23, 1996 (age 30)	(United States) University of Akron	20	0
41	Ethan Kutler	(United States)	RB	May 1, 1995 (age 31)	(United States) Colgate University	37	3
44	Andrew Lombard	(United States)	RB	July 20, 1997 (age 29)	Academy	1	0
47	Hassan Ndam	(Cameroon)	CB	October 29, 1998 (age 28)	(United States) New York Red Bulls (loan)	47	2
58	Jordan Bailon	(United States)	CB	March 24, 2000 (age 26)	Academy	2	0
68	Lucas Stauffer	(United States)	CB	April 21, 1995 (age 31)	Creighton University	9	1
Midfielders
17	Ben Mines	(United States)	CM	May 12, 2000 (age 26)	(United States) New York Red Bulls (loan)	31	4
19	Alex Muyl	(United States)	CM	September 30, 1995 (age 31)	(United States) New York Red Bulls (loan)	8	1
22	Florian Valot	(France)	CM	February 13, 1993 (age 33)	(United States) New York Red Bulls (loan)	57	14
23	Cristian Cásseres	(Venezuela)	CM	January 20, 2000 (age 26)	(United States) New York Red Bulls (loan)	19	3
36	Andrew Tinari	(United States)	CM	September 12, 1995 (age 31)	(United States) Columbia University	50	8
53	John Murphy	(United States)	CM	April 19, 2000 (age 26)	Academy	2	0
55	Steven Echevarria	(United States)	CM	April 21, 1996 (age 30)	(United States) Wake Forest University	9	0
74	Tom Barlow	(United States)	CM	July 8, 1995 (age 31)	(United States) University of Wisconsin	12	3
80	Chris Lema	(United States)	CM	August 5, 1996 (age 30)	(United States) Georgetown University	16	1
88	Vincent Bezecourt	(France)	CM	June 10, 1993 (age 33)	(United States) New York Red Bulls (loan)	49	15
89	Jose Aguinaga	(Spain)	CM	May 11, 1995 (age 31)	(United States) Rider University	11	2
Forwards
20	Amando Moreno	(United States)	FW	September 10, 1995 (age 31)	(United States) New York Red Bulls	19	9
25	Stefano Bonomo	(United States)	FW	January 25, 1993 (age 33)	(United States) New York Red Bulls (loan)	67	27
42	Brian White	(United States)	FW	February 3, 1996 (age 30)	(United States) Duke University	21	8
50	Jared Stroud	(United States)	FW	July 10, 1996 (age 30)	(United States) Colgate University	17	4

== Competitions ==
=== USL ===
==== Eastern Conference standings ====
Pos	Team	Pld	W	D	L	GF	GA	GD	Pts	Qualification
3	Pittsburgh Riverhounds SC	34	15	14	5	47	26	+21	59	Conference Playoffs
4	Charleston Battery	34	14	14	6	47	34	+13	56	Conference Playoffs
5	New York Red Bulls II	34	13	13	8	71	59	+12	52	Conference Playoffs
6	Bethlehem Steel FC	34	14	8	12	56	41	+15	50	Conference Playoffs
7	Indy Eleven	34	13	10	11	45	42	+3	49	Conference Playoffs

Source: 2018 USL standings
Rules for classification: 1) total wins; 2) total goal differential; 3) total goals scored; 4) points earned against top four Conference finishers; 5) disciplinary points; 6) coin toss or drawing of lots

==== Results ====
March 17 1	New York Red Bulls II	2–1	Toronto FC II	Harrison
1:00PM EDT	Tinari 62', 72'	Report	Srbely 11'	Stadium: Red Bull Arena; Attendance: 717; Referee: Kevin Broadley

March 24 2	Atlanta United 2	3–1	New York Red Bulls II	Lawrenceville
7:00 PM EDT	Samuel 25'; Gallagher 41' (pen.), 52'	Report	Echevarria (yellow card) 23'; White 32'; Murphy (yellow card) 89'	Stadium: Coolray Field; Attendance: 5,615; Referee: Sergii Demianchuk

March 31 3	New York Red Bulls II	5–2	Charleston Battery	Harrison
1:00 PM EDT	Cásseres (yellow card) 41'; White 44' (pen.); Tinari 47'; Mines 50'; Moreno 62', 66'	USL Report; NYRB Report	Svantesson (yellow card) 55'; Anuga 56', 78'	Stadium: Red Bull Arena; Attendance: 826; Referee: Jaroslaw Werel

April 7 4	Richmond Kickers	1–1	New York Red Bulls II	Richmond
5:00 PM EDT	Shriver 17'; Thomsen (yellow card) 42'; Lee (yellow card) 67'	Report	Moreno (yellow card) 34'; Scarlett (yellow card) 57'; Aguinaga 69'	Stadium: City Stadium; Attendance: 2,061; Referee: Jonathan Bilinski

April 14 5	New York Red Bulls II	5–0	Tampa Bay Rowdies	Harrison
4:00 PM EDT	Escobar 18' (yellow card) 25' Cásseres (yellow card) 28'; Aguinaga 53'; Bonomo 61'; White 84', 90' Lema (yellow card) 85'	Report	Cole (yellow card) 25'; Blake (yellow card) 77'	Stadium: Red Bull Arena; Attendance: 903; Referee: Alan Kelly

April 22 6	LA Galaxy II	1–1	New York Red Bulls II	Carson
8:30 PM EDT	Llanez Jr. 35'	Report	Moreno 78'	Stadium: StubHub Center; Attendance: 1,131; Referee: Ramy Touchan

April 28 7	Toronto FC II	0–0	New York Red Bulls II	Toronto
6:30 PM EDT		Report		Stadium: BMO Field; Attendance: 117; Referee: Silviu Petrescu

May 2 8	Ottawa Fury FC	0–0	New York Red Bulls II	Ottawa
10:30 AM EDT		Report		Stadium: TD Place Stadium; Attendance: 8,084; Referee: Matt Souare

May 6 9	New York Red Bulls II	1–1	Nashville SC	Harrison
1:00 PM EDT	Bezecourt 27'	Report	Mensah 7'	Stadium: Red Bull Arena; Attendance: 652; Referee: Daniel Gutierrez

May 16 10	Bethlehem Steel FC	3–0	New York Red Bulls II	Bethlehem
5:00 PM EDT	Ngalina 36' Herbers 63' Najem 90+4'	Report		Stadium: Goodman Stadium; Attendance: 1,721; Referee: Jaroslaw Werel

May 27 11	New York Red Bulls II	4-1	Indy Eleven	Harrison
1:00 PM EDT	White 57' Rivas 60'; Moreno 83' Barlow 90+3'	Report	Saad 21'	Stadium: Red Bull Arena; Attendance: 498; Referee: Mark Allatin

June 2 12	New York Red Bulls II	1–2	FC Cincinnati	Harrison
1:00 PM EDT	Moreno 7'	Report	Ledesma 65'; König 77'	Stadium: Red Bull Arena; Attendance: 613; Referee: Ismir Pekmic

June 9 13	New York Red Bulls II	4-2	Charlotte Independence	Montclair
7:00 PM EDT	Moreno 25' Cásseres 60' (pen.); Tinari 62' Stauffer 74'	Report (Team Website)	Cato 23'; Herrera 86' (pen.)	Stadium: MSU Soccer Park; Attendance: 1,150; Referee: Eric Tattersall

June 16 14	Pittsburgh Riverhounds	3–0	New York Red Bulls II	Pittsburgh
7:00 PM EDT	Brett 27', 54'; Parkes 65'	Report		Stadium: Highmark Stadium; Attendance: 3,652; Referee: Greg Dopka

June 20 15	Bethlehem Steel FC	2–2	New York Red Bulls II	Bethlehem
5:00 PM EDT	Mahoney 88'; Chambers 90+4'	Report	Bonomo 12' (pen.), 84'	Stadium: Goodman Stadium; Attendance: 2,210; Referee: Kevin Broadley

June 24 16	New York Red Bulls II	0–3	Ottawa Fury FC	Montclair
5:00 PM EDT		Report	Reid 3', 57', 64'	Stadium: MSU Soccer Park; Attendance: 818; Referee: Bardhyl Pashaj

June 30 17	Louisville City	3–3	New York Red Bulls II	Louisville
7:30 PM EDT	Lancaster 8', 36'; Rasmussen 90+5'	Boxscore	White 49' Cásseres 64' (pen.) Barlow 87'	Stadium: Louisville Slugger Field; Attendance: 7,689; Referee: Javier Santos Escobar

July 6 18	New York Red Bulls II	6–1	Atlanta United 2	Montclair
7:00 PM EDT	Lema 17' Moreno 30'; Kutler 56'; Ndam 71'; Tinari 73' Cásseres 90+1' (pen.)	Boxscore	Scarlett 81' (o.g.)	Stadium: MSU Soccer Park; Attendance: 698; Referee: Thomas Snyder

July 13 19	New York Red Bulls II	5–1	Richmond Kickers	Montclair
7:00 PM EDT	Stroud 2', 14', 69' Moreno 34' White 60'	Boxscore	Shriver 76'	Stadium: MSU Soccer Park; Attendance: 614; Referee: Lorant Varga

July 18 20	New York Red Bulls II	2–1	Bethlehem Steel FC	Montclair
7:00 PM EDT	Etienne Jr. 28'; Moreno 78'	Boxscore	Fontana 45+2'	Stadium: MSU Soccer Park; Attendance: 653; Referee: Daniel Gutierrez

July 21 21	FC Cincinnati	2–1	New York Red Bulls II	Cincinnati
7:30 PM EDT	Lasso 17'; Barrett 35'	Boxscore	Konig 25' ((o.g.))	Stadium: Nippert Stadium; Attendance: 23,602; Referee: Michael Radchuk

July 28 22	Tampa Bay Rowdies	2–2	New York Red Bulls II	St. Petersburg
7:30 PM EDT	Bonomo 8' (pen.), 9', (yellow card) 35'; Oduro (yellow card) 45+2'; Flemmings (red card) 45+9'; Mizell (yellow card) 88'	Report	Stroud 2'; Ndam (yellow card) 17'; White 62'	Stadium: Al Lang Stadium; Attendance: 5,784; Referee: Elvis Osmanovic

August 3 23	New York Red Bulls II	2–1	Penn FC	Montclair
7:00 PM EDT	Tinari 19'; Barlow 25'	Match Center	Mkosana 57'	Stadium: MSU Soccer Park; Attendance: 627; Referee: Eric Tattersall

August 10 24	New York Red Bulls II	4–6	Louisville City	Montclair
7:00 PM EDT	Tinari 7', (yellow card) 57'; Kutler 14'; Aguinaga 80'; Ndam 90+1' (pen.)	Report	Ilić 18', 53'; Smith (yellow card) 32'; Lancaster 43', 63', 88'; Davis IV 48'	Stadium: MSU Soccer Park; Attendance: 713; Referee: Sergii Demianchuk

August 21 25	New York Red Bulls II	2–2	North Carolina FC	Montclair
7:00 PM EDT	Aguinaga 39'; Stroud (yellow card) 47'; Stauffer 53' (yellow card) 88'; Mines (red card) 69'; Cásseres (yellow card) 81'	Report	da Luz (yellow card) 43'; Ríos 46'; Bekker (yellow card) 61'; Tobin (yellow card) 68'; Smith (yellow card) 76'; Ewolo 90'	Stadium: MSU Soccer Park; Attendance: 781; Referee: Jose Lara

August 25 26	Charleston Battery	4–4	New York Red Bulls II	Charleston
7:00 PM EDT	Guerra 22', 45+2', (yellow card) 57'; Okonkwo 28', 75'; Tah Anunga (red card) 61'	Report	Barlow 64' (pen.), 73', 88'; Aguinaga 68'; Ackwei (yellow card) 90+3'	Stadium: MUSC Health Stadium; Attendance: 2,741; Referee: Matthew Franz

August 31 27	New York Red Bulls II	1–0	Ottawa Fury FC	Montclair
7:00 PM EDT	Stroud 9'	Report	Portilla (yellow card) 52'; Edward (red card) 54'	Stadium: MSU Soccer Park; Referee: Daniel Gutierrez

September 5 28	Indy Eleven	3–0	New York Red Bulls II	Indianapolis
7:00 PM EDT	Starikov 2', 21'; Matern (yellow card) 5'; Mitchell (yellow card) 38'; Reiner 43'; Watson (yellow card) 62'	Report	Abang (yellow card) 53'	Stadium: Lucas Oil Stadium; Attendance: 8,703; Referee: Jon Freemon

September 13 29	New York Red Bulls II	3–3	Toronto FC II	Montclair
7:00 PM EDT	Abang 12'; Ivan 39'; White (yellow card) 57', (goal) 68'	Report	Endoh 23'; Kübel 36'; Hamilton 62'; Boskovic (yellow card) 79'	Stadium: MSU Soccer Park; Referee: Jonathan Bilinski

September 22 30	Charlotte Independence	1–1	New York Red Bulls II	Matthews
7:00 PM EDT	Jordan 15'; Johnson (yellow card) 33'	Report	Aguinaga (yellow card) 54'; Cásseres (yellow card) 62'; Abang 70'; Ndam (yellow card) 90+2'	Stadium: Sportsplex at Matthews; Attendance: 1,608; Referee: Eric Tattersall

September 29 31	Nashville SC	1–1	New York Red Bulls II	Nashville
7:30 PM EDT	Reed 26'; Akinyode (yellow card) 53'; LaGrassa (yellow card) 65'; Washington (yellow card) 69'	Report	Moreno 5'; Aguinaga (red card) 24'; Stroud (yellow card) 72'; Kutler (yellow card) 78'	Stadium: First Tennessee Park; Attendance: 8,036; Referee: Elvis Osmanovic

October 6 32	North Carolina FC	1–2	New York Red Bulls II	Cary
7:00 PM EDT	Guillen (yellow card) 45+3'; Bekker 52'	Report	Abang 24', (red card) 45+6'; Barlow 79'	Stadium: WakeMed Soccer Park; Attendance: 8,820; Referee: Ismir Pekmic

October 9 33	Penn FC	1–3	New York Red Bulls II	Harrisburg
6:30 PM EDT	Jaime 25'; Rezende (yellow card) 40'; De Sousa (yellow card) 83'; Bond (yellow card) 89'	Report	Stroud 32'; Scarlett (yellow card) 58'; White 66'; Aguinaga 88'	Stadium: FNB Field; Attendance: 1,208; Referee: Marcos de Oliveira

October 14 34	New York Red Bulls II	2–1	Pittsburgh Riverhounds	Montclair
5:00 PM EDT	Barlow 30'; Stroud 90+1'	Report	Greenspan 90+5'	Stadium: MSU Soccer Park; Attendance: 1,592; Referee: Matthew Franz

==== Postseason ====
October 20 Quarterfinal	Charleston Battery	0–1	New York Red Bulls II	Charleston, South Carolina
7:00 P.M.	Bolt (yellow card) 16'	Report	Barlow 21'; Stroud (yellow card) 66'	Stadium: MUSC Health Stadium; Attendance: 1,687; Referee: Rosendo Mendoza

October 27 Semi-Final	FC Cincinnati	0–1	New York Red Bulls II	Cincinnati, Ohio
4:00 p.m. EDT	Adi (yellow card) 41'	Report	Moreno 12', (yellow card) 72'	Stadium: Nippert Stadium; Attendance: 16,617; Referee: Timothy Ford

November 2 Conference finals	Louisville City FC	5–1	New York Red Bulls II	Louisville, Kentucky
7:30 p.m. EDT	Ilić 23' (pen.), (yellow card) 40'; Spencer 32'; Davis (yellow card) 61'; Craig (yellow card) 65'; Ownby (yellow card) 69', (goal) 81'; Williams 73', 75'; McCabe (yellow card) 80'	Report	Ndam (yellow card) 22'; Tinari (yellow card) 44'; Barlow 60'	Stadium: Louisville Slugger Field; Attendance: 10,059; Referee: Ramy Touchan; Assistant referees: Chris Elliott; Gjovalin Bori; Fourth official: Victor Rivas

== Player statistics ==
=== Top scorers ===
Place	Position	Number	Name	USL	USL Cup	Total
1	FW	20	(United States) Amando Moreno	9	0	9
2	FW	42	(United States) Brian White	8	0	8
3	MF	36	(United States) Andrew Tinari	6	0	6
4	FW	25	(United States) Stefano Bonomo	4	0	4
4	FW	50	(United States) Jared Stroud	4	0	4
6	MF	23	(Venezuela) Cristian Cásseres Jr.	3	0	3
6	FW	74	(United States) Tom Barlow	3	0	3
8	MF	89	(Spain) Jose Aguinaga	2	0	2
9	FW	7	(Haiti) Derrick Etienne	1	0	1
9	FW	11	(Colombia) Carlos Rivas	1	0	1
9	MF	17	(United States) Ben Mines	1	0	1
9	DF	29	(Panama) Fidel Escobar	1	0	1
9	DF	41	(United States) Ethan Kutler	1	0	1
9	DF	47	(Cameroon) Hassan Ndam	1	0	1
9	DF	68	(United States) Lucas Stauffer	1	0	1
9	MF	80	(United States) Chris Lema	1	0	1
9	MF	88	(France) Vincent Bezecourt	1	0	1
Total				46	0	46

- Updated to matches played on August 4, 2018.
