= Andrew Tinari =

American soccer player (born 1995)

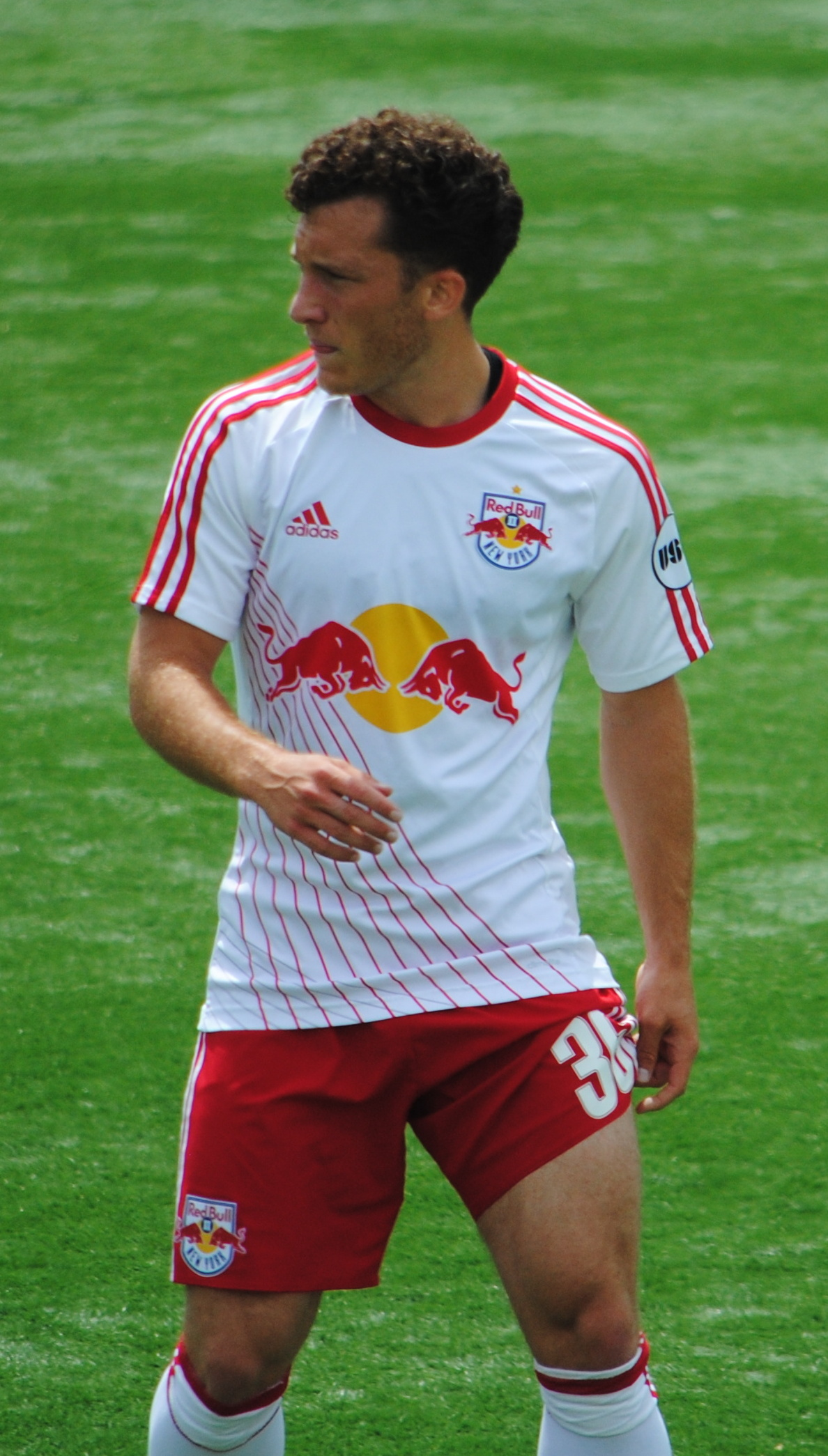

Personal information
- Date of birth: September 12, 1995 (age 31)
- Place of birth: West Islip, New York, United States
- Height: 5 ft 6 in (1.68 m)
- Positions: Midfielder; defender

Team information
- Current team: Lansdowne Yonkers

College career
Years	Team	Apps	(Gls)
2013–2016	Columbia Lions	62	(9)

Senior career*
Years	Team	Apps	(Gls)
2014	Jersey Express	3	(0)
2017–2018	New York Red Bulls II	56	(9)
2019	Tampa Bay Rowdies	21	(5)
2020–2021	New Mexico United	42	(3)
2022–	Lansdowne Yonkers		
- * Club domestic league appearances and goals as of March 30, 2022

Andrew Tinari (born September 12, 1995) is an American soccer player who currently plays for Lansdowne Yonkers in the Eastern Premier Soccer League.

== College career ==
Tinari was born in West Islip, New York, raised in Holbrook, and graduated from Sachem High School East. He played college soccer at Columbia University between 2013 and 2016, and in the USL Premier Development League with Jersey Express.

== Club career ==
=== New York Red Bulls II ===
Tinari signed with United Soccer League side New York Red Bulls II on March 23, 2017. He made his professional debut on March 25, 2017, starting in a 3–3 draw with Pittsburgh Riverhounds. On August 27, 2017, Tinari scored his first goal as a professional and also assisted on another in a 2–2 draw against Ottawa Fury FC. On September 2, 2017, Tinari scored his second goal of the season for New York in a 4–2 victory over Tampa Bay Rowdies.

On March 17, 2018, Tinari scored two goals to help New York to a 2–1 victory over Toronto FC II in the opening match of the season. On March 31, 2018, Tinari scored his third goal of the season and assisted on another in New York's 5–2 victory over Charleston Battery. On June 9, 2018, Tinari helped New York to a 4–2 victory over Charlotte Independence contributing his fourth goal of the season.

=== Tampa Bay Rowdies ===
Tinari signed with the Tampa Bay Rowdies on February 1, 2019.

=== New Mexico United ===
Tinari signed with New Mexico United on February 7, 2020 His contract was not renewed for the 2022 season.

=== Lansdowne Yonkers ===
On August 20, 2022, Tinari joined Eastern Premier Soccer League side Lansdowne Yonkers FC.

== Career statistics ==
As of match played November 8, 2021

Club	Season	League			League Cup		Domestic Cup		Total	
Club	Season	Division	Apps	Goals	Apps	Goals	Apps	Goals	Apps	Goals
Jersey Express	2014	USL PDL	3	0	0	0	0	0	3	0
New York Red Bulls II	2017	USL	23	2	3 (Note: Appearance(s) in USL Cup playoff)	0	—		26	2
New York Red Bulls II	2018	USL	33	7	3	0	—		36	7
New York Red Bulls II	Total		56	9	6	0	—		62	9
Tampa Bay Rowdies	2019	USL Championship	21	5	1 (Note: Appearances in USL Championship playoffs)	0	0	0	22	5
New Mexico United	2020	USL Championship	14	1	2	0	—		16	1
New Mexico United	2021	USL Championship	28	2	—		—		28	2
New Mexico United	Total		42	3	2	0	0	0	44	3
Career total			122	17	9	0	0	0	131	17
