= Ethan Kutler =

American professional soccer player (born 1995)

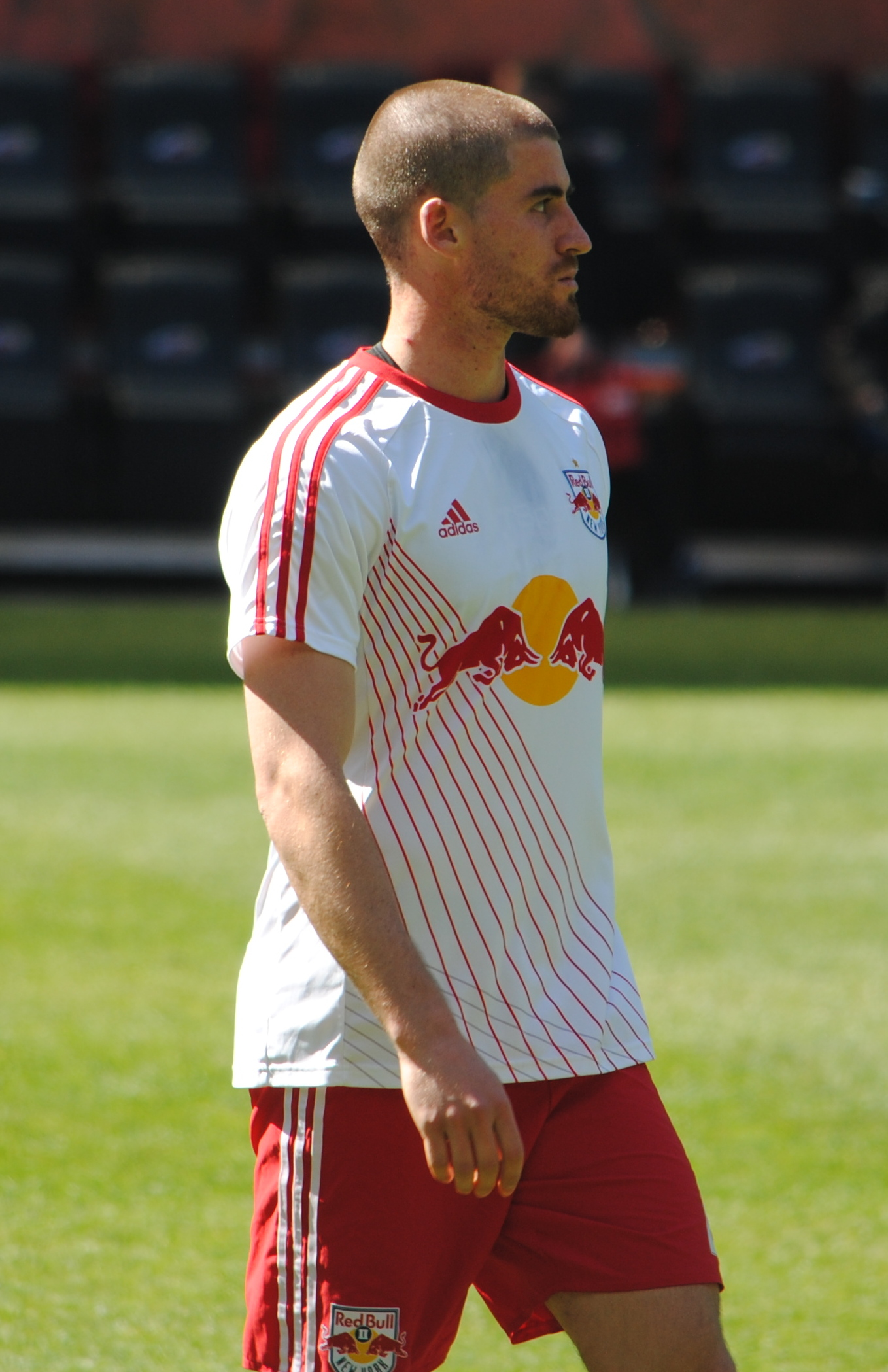

Personal information
- Date of birth: May 1, 1995 (age 31)
- Place of birth: Cooperstown, New York, United States
- Height: 5 ft 11 in (1.80 m)
- Position: Midfielder

Team information
- Current team: Sharktopus FC

College career
Years	Team	Apps	(Gls)
2013–2016	Colgate Raiders	73	(33)

Senior career*
Years	Team	Apps	(Gls)
2014	Greater Binghamton FC	9	(7)
2015	Michigan Bucks	3	(0)
2017–2018	New York Red Bulls II	22	(0)
2018	New York Red Bulls	4	(0)
2018	→ New York Red Bulls II (loan)	18	(2)
2019	Pittsburgh Riverhounds SC	0	(0)
- * Club domestic league appearances and goals as of March 8, 2019

Ethan Henry Kutler (born May 1, 1995) is an American professional soccer player who plays as a midfielder. He played for a season with the New York Red Bulls in Major League Soccer and spent several years with their reserve team.

== Career ==
=== College and amateur ===
Kutler played college soccer at Colgate University between 2013 and 2016, in the National Premier Soccer League with Greater Binghamton FC, and in the USL Premier Development League with Michigan Bucks.

=== Professional ===
Kutler was drafted in the second round (39th overall) of the 2017 MLS SuperDraft by New York Red Bulls. He made his professional debut with the Red Bulls' United Soccer League affiliate New York Red Bulls II on March 25, 2017, starting at right back in a 3–3 draw with Pittsburgh Riverhounds. On October 22, 2017, Kutler scored his first goal as a professional, helping New York to a 4–0 victory over Charleston Battery in the 2017 USL Playoffs.

On May 1, 2018, Kutler signed with New York Red Bulls on a first team contract. Kutler made his first team debut on June 6, 2018, appearing as a starter in the team's 4–0 derby win over New York City FC in the fourth round of the 2018 Lamar Hunt U.S. Open Cup. On June 13, 2018, Kutler made his first career MLS start, providing two assists in a 2–1 home win over Seattle Sounders FC. On July 6, 2018, Kutler scored his first goal of the season for New York Red Bulls II in a 6–1 victory over Atlanta United 2.

Kutler was released by the Red Bulls at the end of their 2018 season.

On March 8, 2019, Kutler signed for USL Championship club Pittsburgh Riverhounds SC; he had been on trial for a week with Pittsburgh before signing a one-year contract.

=== Later career ===
Kutler retired from professional soccer in 2019 and has played for amateur team Sharktopus FC since 2022.

== Career statistics ==
As of March 8, 2019

Club	Season	League			Playoffs (Note: All appearances in the USL Cup Playoffs)		Cup		Continental		Total	
Club	Season	Division	Apps	Goals	Apps	Goals	Apps	Goals	Apps	Goals	Apps	Goals
Greater Binghamton FC	2014	NPSL	9	7	0	0	0	0	–		9	7
Michigan Bucks	2015	PDL	3	0	0	0	0	0	–		3	0
New York Red Bulls II	2017	USL	15	0	3	1	–		–		18	1
New York Red Bulls II	2018	USL	7	0	0	0	–		–		7	0
New York Red Bulls II	Total		22	0	3	1	0	0	0	0	25	1
New York Red Bulls	2018	MLS	4	0	0	0	1	0	0	0	5	0
New York Red Bulls II (loan)	2018	USL	18	2	3	0	–		–		21	2
Pittsburgh Riverhounds SC	2019	USL Championship	0	0	0	0	0	0	–		0	0
Career total			56	9	6	1	1	0	0	0	63	10

== Honors ==
=== Club ===
New York Red Bulls

- MLS Supporters' Shield (1): 2018
