= Craig Dalrymple =

English footballer (born 1973)

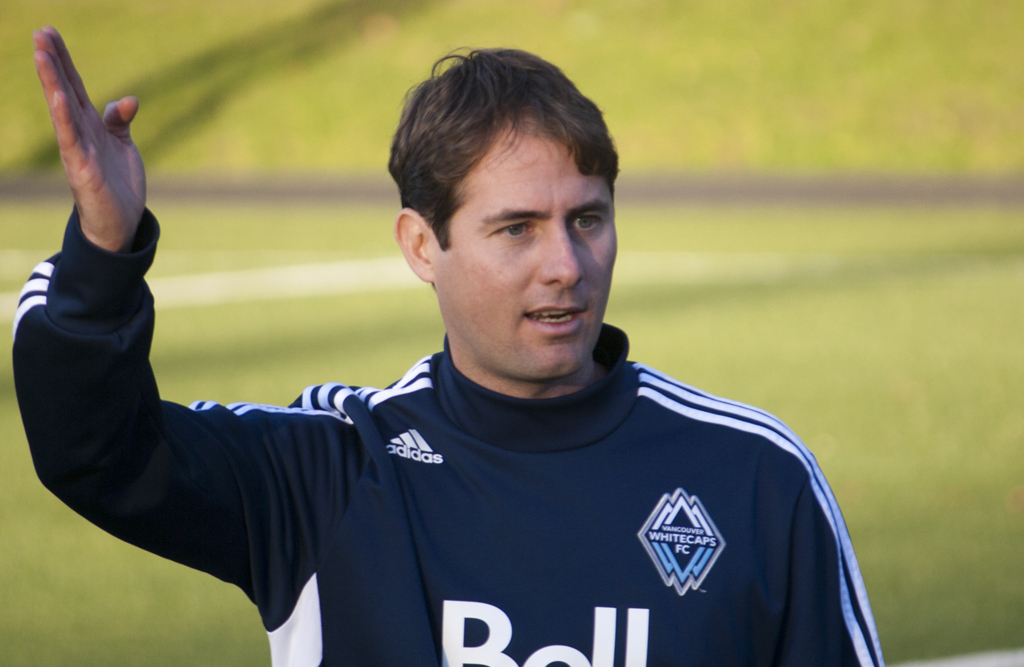
- Dalrymple in 2011

Personal information
- Date of birth: 30 December 1973 (age 52)
- Place of birth: Melton Mowbray, England
- Position: Midfielder

Team information
- Current team: Seattle Sounders FC (head of professional player development)

Youth career
- Years: Team
- 1986–1992: Ipswich Town
1992–1993	Capilano University(CCAA)		
1994–1995	Simon Fraser University (NAIA)		
1995–1998	Vancouver 86ers	41	(4)
1999–2005	Surrey United Premier		

Managerial career
- 2002–2003: BCSA Provincial Team (U16 head coach)
- 2009–2010: Portsmouth (U16 head coach)
- 2010–2011: Vancouver Whitecaps Residency (U23 head coach)
- 2011–2020: Vancouver Whitecaps Residency (U15, U16, U18, U23 head coach)
- 2018: Vancouver Whitecaps FC (interim)

Craig Dalrymple (born 30 December 1973) is an English former footballer who serves as the Seattle Sounders FC's head of professional player development. Formerly, Dalrymple worked for Inter Miami CF and the Vancouver Whitecaps FC as an academy director.

== Playing career ==
Dalrymple was born in Melton Mowbray, Leicestershire, England. Dalrymple began his career was a midfielder with Ipswich Town's academy. Craig went on to spend six years with the Tractor Boys without making a first team appearance.

Following his time at Ipswich, Craig went on to play for a number of clubs and institutions including a stint with the Vancouver Whitecaps in their previous incarnation as the Vancouver 86ers.

== Coaching career ==
On 25 September 2018, Dalrymple was announced as interim head coach of the Vancouver Whitecaps.

Before rejoining the Whitecaps, Darlymple held a number of technical, coaching and scouting positions within the game.

Dalrymple was promoted to the Technical Director of the Vancouver Whitecaps FC Residency in January 2014 after serving many roles within the MLS club including U15, U16, U18, U23 head coach, head of player development, assistant Technical Director, and head of recruitment.

Prior to joining the Whitecaps FC Darlymple's spent a one-year stint as a youth coach with Portsmouth working with the academy players, and 10 years as technical director of Surrey United Soccer Club in Surrey, British Columbia.

Dalrymple is a fully licensed coach holding several coaching 'badges' include the UEFA Pro License from the English FA, 'A'-level license certification from the UEFA, the USSF and the CSA. He also holds the Academy Directors License from the English FA, and was most recently one of only 20 MLS coaches that completed the French Football Federation Elite Formation Coaching License.

In 2007, Dalrymple was also employed in the role of scout for the Canadian U-20 soccer team. Dalrymple began at the Vancouver Whitecaps in May 2010. Dalrymple was the Whitecaps Residency head coach in the 2010 USL Premier Development League campaign, succeeding interim head coach Colin Miller.
