= José Aguinaga =

Spanish footballer (born 1995)

Personal information
- Full name: José Luis Aguinaga Morinigo
- Date of birth: May 11, 1995 (age 31)
- Place of birth: Madrid, Spain
- Height: 1.75 m (5 ft 9 in)
- Positions: Forward; midfielder

Youth career
- Rayo Vallecano
- 2009–2011: Real Madrid
- 2012–2014: Getafe CF

College career
Years	Team	Apps	(Gls)
2014–2017	Rider Broncs	76	(18)

Senior career*
Years	Team	Apps	(Gls)
2016	Seattle Sounders FC U-23	11	(4)
2017	New York Red Bulls U-23	14	(7)
2018	New York Red Bulls II	21	(6)
2019–2020	Phoenix Rising	38	(3)
2021	El Paso Locomotive	19	(2)
- * Club domestic league appearances and goals as of 7 November 2021

José Aguinaga (born 11 May 1995) is a Spanish footballer who plays as a midfielder.

== Career ==
=== Youth career ===
Born in Madrid, Aguinaga began his career playing for Rayo Vallecano's youth setup before moving to Real Madrid's cantera. After two years with Real Madrid, Aguinaga joined the youth system of Getafe CF.

Aguinaga also played four years of college soccer at Rider University between 2014 and 2017. While at Rider, Aguinaga made 76 appearances, scored 18 goals and tallied 32 assists.

While with the Broncs, Aguinaga also appeared for Premier Development League sides Seattle Sounders FC U-23 and New York Red Bulls U-23.

=== New York Red Bulls ===
On January 21, 2018, Aguinaga was drafted in the fourth round (85th overall) of the 2018 MLS SuperDraft by New York Red Bulls. On March 15, 2018, Aguinaga signed with New York Red Bulls II of the United Soccer League. On March 31, 2018, Aguinaga made his first appearance with New York, coming on as a second-half substitute in 5–2 victory over Charleston Battery. On April 7, 2018, Aguinaga scored his first goal for New York, the equalizing goal in a 1–1 draw with Richmond Kickers. On April 14, 2018, Aguinaga started his first match for New York, scoring one goal in a 5–0 victory over Tampa Bay Rowdies.

=== Phoenix Rising ===
Aguinaga was signed by Phoenix Rising FC on December 18, 2018.

=== El Paso Locomotive ===
On 8 January 2021, Aguinaga moved to USL Championship side El Paso Locomotive. He left El Paso following their 2021 season.

== Career statistics ==
As of October 28, 2018

Club	Season	League		League Cup		US Open Cup		Continental		Total	
Club	Season	Apps	Goals	Apps	Goals	Apps	Goals	Apps	Goals	Apps	Goals
Seattle Sounders FC U-23	2016	11	4	1	0	0	0	0	0	12	4
New York Red Bulls U-23	2017	14	7	1	0	0	0	0	0	15	7
New York Red Bulls II	2018	21	6	3	0	0	0	0	0	24	6
Phoenix Rising FC	2019	30	3	1	0	0	0	0	0	24	6
Career total		46	17	5	0	0	0	0	0	51	17
