= 2018 Major League Soccer season =

23rd season of Major League Soccer

Major League Soccer
- Season: 2018
- Dates: March 3 – October 28 (regular season); October 31 – December 8 (playoffs)
- Teams: 23
- MLS Cup: Atlanta United FC (1st title)
- Supporters' Shield: New York Red Bulls (3rd shield)
- Champions League (United States): Atlanta United FC; Houston Dynamo; New York Red Bulls
- Champions League (Canada): Toronto FC
- Matches: 391
- Goals: 1,249 (3.19 per match)
- Top goalscorer: Josef Martínez (31 goals)
- Best goalkeeper: Luis Robles (14 shutouts)
- Biggest home win: 6 goals: SKC 6–0 VAN (April 20)
- Biggest away win: 6 goals: COL 0–6 RSL (August 25)
- Highest scoring: 8 goals: MTL 3–5 LAFC (April 21); TOR 4–4 DC (June 13); RSL 6–2 LAG (September 1); TOR 5–3 LAG (September 15)
- Longest winning run: 9 games Seattle Sounders FC (July 21 – September 19)
- Longest unbeaten run: 15 games Portland Timbers (April 14 – August 11)
- Longest winless run: 13 games Orlando City SC (July 21 – October 21)
- Longest losing run: 9 games Orlando City SC (May 13 – July 7)
- Highest attendance: 72,243; ATL 1–1 SEA (July 15)
- Lowest attendance: 5,158; DC 2–2 HOU (March 17)
- Total attendance: 8,553,245
- Average attendance: 21,875

The 2018 Major League Soccer season was the 23rd season of Major League Soccer, top division of soccer in the United States and Canada. The regular season began on March 3, 2018 and concluded on October 28, 2018. The MLS Cup playoffs began on October 31, 2018 and concluded with MLS Cup 2018 on December 8, 2018. The league took a nine-day hiatus in early June for the 2018 FIFA World Cup, reduced from previous breaks.

Los Angeles FC joined the league as an expansion franchise, while D.C. United debuted their new soccer-specific stadium, Audi Field.

Toronto FC were the defending Supporters' Shield champions and defending MLS Cup champions.

New York Red Bulls won their third Supporters' Shield, with a league record 71 points, while Atlanta United FC won their first MLS Cup in their second year in the league.

== Teams ==
=== Stadiums and locations ===
Western Conference
Team	Stadium	Capacity
Colorado Rapids	Dick's Sporting Goods Park	18,061
FC Dallas	Toyota Stadium	20,500
Houston Dynamo	BBVA Compass Stadium	22,039
LA Galaxy	StubHub Center	27,000
Los Angeles FC	Banc of California Stadium	22,000
Minnesota United FC	TCF Bank Stadium	21,895
Portland Timbers	Providence Park	21,144
Real Salt Lake	Rio Tinto Stadium	20,213
San Jose Earthquakes	Avaya Stadium	18,000
Seattle Sounders FC	CenturyLink Field	39,419
Sporting Kansas City	Children's Mercy Park	18,467
Vancouver Whitecaps FC	BC Place	22,120

Eastern Conference
Team	Stadium	Capacity
Atlanta United FC	Mercedes-Benz Stadium	42,500
Chicago Fire	Toyota Park	20,000
Columbus Crew SC	Mapfre Stadium	19,968
D.C. United	Audi Field	20,000
Montreal Impact	Saputo Stadium	20,801
New England Revolution	Gillette Stadium	20,000
New York City FC	Yankee Stadium	30,321
New York Red Bulls	Red Bull Arena	25,000
Orlando City SC	Orlando City Stadium	25,500
Philadelphia Union	Talen Energy Stadium	18,500
Toronto FC	BMO Field	30,000

Locations of teams for the 2018 Major League Soccer season
Western Conference Eastern Conference

1. Non-soccer specific stadium and artificially reduced capacity.

=== Personnel and sponsorship ===
Note: All teams use Adidas as kit manufacturer.

Team	Head coach	Captain	Shirt sponsor
Atlanta United FC	(Argentina) Tata Martino	(United States) Michael Parkhurst	American Family Insurance
Chicago Fire	(Serbia) Veljko Paunović	(United States) Dax McCarty	Valspar
Colorado Rapids	(England) Anthony Hudson	(United States) Tim Howard	Transamerica
Columbus Crew SC	(United States) Gregg Berhalter	(United States) Wil Trapp	Acura
D.C. United	(United States) Ben Olsen	(England) Wayne Rooney	Leidos
FC Dallas	(Colombia) Óscar Pareja	(United States) Matt Hedges	AdvoCare
Houston Dynamo	(Colombia) Wílmer Cabrera	(United States) DaMarcus Beasley	—
LA Galaxy	(United States) Dominic Kinnear (Note: Kinnear was named interim head coach of the Galaxy on September 10 following Sigi Schmid's departure on that day.)	(England) Ashley Cole	Herbalife
Los Angeles FC	(United States) Bob Bradley	(Mexico) Carlos Vela	YouTube TV
Minnesota United FC	(England) Adrian Heath	(Costa Rica) Francisco Calvo	Target
Montreal Impact	(France) Rémi Garde	(Argentina) Ignacio Piatti	Bank of Montreal
New England Revolution	(United States) Brad Friedel	(France) Claude Dielna	UnitedHealthcare
New York City FC	(Spain) Domènec Torrent (Note: Torrent was named head coach of New York City FC on June 11 following Patrick Vieira's departure on that day to manage OGC Nice.)	(Spain) David Villa	Etihad Airways
New York Red Bulls	(United States) Chris Armas (Note: Armas was named head coach of the Red Bulls on July 6 following Jesse Marsch's departure on that day to join the coaching staff of RB Leipzig.)	(United States) Luis Robles	Red Bull
Orlando City SC	(Republic of Ireland) James O'Connor (Note: O'Connor was named head coach on June 29, but did not join Orlando City until July 1. Bobby Murphy, who had been named interim head coach on June 15 after Orlando City and Jason Kreis agreed to part ways, coached the team's June 30 match.)	(United States) Jonathan Spector	Orlando Health
Philadelphia Union	(United States) Jim Curtin	(United States) Alejandro Bedoya	Bimbo Bakeries USA
Portland Timbers	(Venezuela) Giovanni Savarese	(Argentina) Diego Valeri	Alaska Airlines
Real Salt Lake	(United States) Mike Petke	(United States) Kyle Beckerman	LifeVantage
San Jose Earthquakes	(Argentina) Matias Almeyda (Note: Almeyda was named head coach on October 8, replacing interim head coach Steve Ralston, who took over after the Earthquakes fired Mikael Stahre on September 17.)	(United States) Chris Wondolowski	Sutter Health
Seattle Sounders FC	(United States) Brian Schmetzer	(Cuba) Osvaldo Alonso	Xbox
Sporting Kansas City	(United States) Peter Vermes	(United States) Matt Besler	Ivy Funds
Toronto FC	(United States) Greg Vanney	(United States) Michael Bradley	Bank of Montreal
Vancouver Whitecaps FC	(England) Craig Dalrymple (Note: Dalrymple was named interim head coach after the Whitecaps parted ways with Carl Robinson on September 25.)	(Costa Rica) Kendall Waston	Bell Canada

=== Coaching changes ===
Team	Outgoing coach	Manner of departure	Date of vacancy	Position in table	Incoming coach	Date of appointment
Montreal Impact	(Canada) Mauro Biello	Fired	October 23, 2017	Pre-season	(France) Rémi Garde	November 8, 2017
New England Revolution	(United States) Tom Soehn (interim)	End of interim period	November 9, 2017	Pre-season	(United States) Brad Friedel	November 9, 2017
Portland Timbers	(United States) Caleb Porter	Resigned	November 17, 2017	Pre-season	(Venezuela) Giovanni Savarese	December 18, 2017
San Jose Earthquakes	(United States) Chris Leitch	Returned to technical director role	November 24, 2017	Pre-season	(Sweden) Mikael Stahre	November 24, 2017
Colorado Rapids	(England) Steve Cooke (interim)	End of interim period	November 29, 2017	Pre-season	(England) Anthony Hudson	November 29, 2017
New York City FC	(France) Patrick Vieira	Signed by (France) Nice	June 11, 2018	2nd in East, 4th overall	(Spain) Domènec Torrent	June 11, 2018
Orlando City SC	(United States) Jason Kreis	Mutual decision	June 15, 2018	6th in East, 14th overall	(United States) Bobby Murphy (interim)	June 15, 2018
Orlando City SC	(United States) Bobby Murphy (interim)	End of interim period	June 29, 2018	8th in East, 17th overall	(Republic of Ireland) James O'Connor	June 29, 2018
New York Red Bulls	(United States) Jesse Marsch	Signed by (Germany) RB Leipzig	July 6, 2018	2nd in East, 3rd overall	(United States) Chris Armas	July 6, 2018
LA Galaxy	(Germany) Sigi Schmid	Resigned	September 10, 2018	8th in West, 13th overall	(United States) Dominic Kinnear (interim)	September 10, 2018
San Jose Earthquakes	(Sweden) Mikael Stahre	Fired	September 17, 2018	12th in West, 23rd overall	(United States) Steve Ralston (interim)	September 17, 2018
Vancouver Whitecaps FC	(Wales) Carl Robinson	Fired	September 25, 2018	8th in West, 14th overall	(England) Craig Dalrymple (interim)	September 25, 2018
San Jose Earthquakes	(United States) Steve Ralston (interim)	End of interim period	October 8, 2018	12th in West, 23rd overall	(Argentina) Matías Almeyda	October 8, 2018

== Regular season ==
=== Format ===
During the 2018 MLS regular season, each team played 34 games, including 17 home games and 17 away games. Teams faced each of their conference opponents (10 in the East, 11 in the West) twice during the season with one game at home and one game away. Western Conference teams played one additional intra-conference game and Eastern Conference teams played two. All teams faced each non-conference opponent once.

=== Eastern Conference ===
Pos	Team	Pld	W	L	T	GF	GA	GD	Pts	Qualification
1	New York Red Bulls	34	22	7	5	62	33	+29	71	Qualification for the conference semifinals
2	Atlanta United FC	34	21	7	6	70	44	+26	69	Qualification for the conference semifinals
3	New York City FC	34	16	10	8	59	45	+14	56	Qualification for the knockout round
4	D.C. United	34	14	11	9	60	50	+10	51	Qualification for the knockout round
5	Columbus Crew	34	14	11	9	43	45	−2	51	Qualification for the knockout round
6	Philadelphia Union	34	15	14	5	49	50	−1	50	Qualification for the knockout round
7	Montreal Impact	34	14	16	4	47	53	−6	46	
8	New England Revolution	34	10	13	11	49	55	−6	41	
9	Toronto FC	34	10	18	6	59	64	−5	36	
10	Chicago Fire	34	8	18	8	48	61	−13	32	
11	Orlando City SC	34	8	22	4	43	74	−31	28	

Source: MLS

=== Western Conference ===
Pos	Team	Pld	W	L	T	GF	GA	GD	Pts	Qualification
1	Sporting Kansas City	34	18	8	8	65	40	+25	62	Qualification for the conference semifinals
2	Seattle Sounders FC	34	18	11	5	52	37	+15	59	Qualification for the conference semifinals
3	Los Angeles FC	34	16	9	9	68	52	+16	57	Qualification for the knockout round
4	FC Dallas	34	16	9	9	52	44	+8	57	Qualification for the knockout round
5	Portland Timbers	34	15	10	9	54	48	+6	54	Qualification for the knockout round
6	Real Salt Lake	34	14	13	7	55	58	−3	49	Qualification for the knockout round
7	LA Galaxy	34	13	12	9	66	64	+2	48	
8	Vancouver Whitecaps FC	34	13	13	8	54	67	−13	47	
9	Houston Dynamo	34	10	16	8	58	58	0	38	
10	Minnesota United FC	34	11	20	3	49	71	−22	36	
11	Colorado Rapids	34	8	19	7	36	63	−27	31	
12	San Jose Earthquakes	34	4	21	9	49	71	−22	21	

Source: MLS

=== Overall standings ===
Pos	Team	Pld	W	L	T	GF	GA	GD	Pts	Qualification
1	New York Red Bulls (S)	34	22	7	5	62	33	+29	71	Qualification for the CONCACAF Champions League
2	Atlanta United FC (C)	34	21	7	6	70	44	+26	69	Qualification for the CONCACAF Champions League
3	Sporting Kansas City	34	18	8	8	65	40	+25	62	Qualification for the CONCACAF Champions League
4	Seattle Sounders FC	34	18	11	5	52	37	+15	59	
5	Los Angeles FC	34	16	9	9	68	52	+16	57	
6	FC Dallas	34	16	9	9	52	44	+8	57	
7	New York City FC	34	16	10	8	59	45	+14	56	
8	Portland Timbers	34	15	10	9	54	48	+6	54	
9	D.C. United	34	14	11	9	60	50	+10	51	
10	Columbus Crew	34	14	11	9	43	45	−2	51	
11	Philadelphia Union	34	15	14	5	49	50	−1	50	
12	Real Salt Lake	34	14	13	7	55	58	−3	49	
13	LA Galaxy	34	13	12	9	66	64	+2	48	
14	Vancouver Whitecaps FC	34	13	13	8	54	67	−13	47	
15	Montreal Impact	34	14	16	4	47	53	−6	46	
16	New England Revolution	34	10	13	11	49	55	−6	41	
17	Houston Dynamo (U)	34	10	16	8	58	58	0	38	Qualification for the CONCACAF Champions League
18	Minnesota United FC	34	11	20	3	49	71	−22	36	
19	Toronto FC (V)	34	10	18	6	59	64	−5	36	Qualification for the CONCACAF Champions League
20	Chicago Fire	34	8	18	8	48	61	−13	32	
21	Colorado Rapids	34	8	19	7	36	63	−27	31	
22	Orlando City SC	34	8	22	4	43	74	−31	28	
23	San Jose Earthquakes	34	4	21	9	49	71	−22	21	

Source: MLS
Rules for classification: 1) points; 2) total wins; 3) total goal differential; 4) total goals scored; 5) disciplinary points; 6) away goals scored; 7) away goal differential; 8) coin toss or drawing of lots
(C) MLS Cup champions; (S) Supporters' Shield winners; (U) U.S. Open Cup winners; (V) Canadian Championship winners

== MLS Cup playoffs ==
=== Bracket ===
Knockout round	Conference semifinals
E3	New York City FC	0	1	1
10/31 – New York City, New York
E2	Atlanta United FC	1	3	4
E3	New York City FC	3
E6	Philadelphia Union	1
Eastern Conference
E5	Columbus Crew	1	0	1
11/1 – Washington, D.C.
E1	New York Red Bulls	0	3	3
E4	D.C. United	2 (2)
E5	Columbus Crew (p)	2 (3)
W5	Portland Timbers (p)	2	2	4 (4)
10/31 – Frisco, Texas
W2	Seattle Sounders FC	1	3	4 (2)
W4	FC Dallas	1
W5	Portland Timbers	2
Western Conference
W6	Real Salt Lake	1	2	3
11/1 – Los Angeles, California
W1	Sporting Kansas City	1	4	5
W3	Los Angeles FC	2
W6	Real Salt Lake	3

Conference finals
E2	Atlanta United FC	3	0	3
E1	New York Red Bulls	0	1	1
W5	Portland Timbers	0	3	3
W1	Sporting Kansas City	0	2	2

MLS Cup; December 8 – Atlanta, Georgia
E2	Atlanta United FC	2
W5	Portland Timbers	0

=== MLS Cup ===
December 8, 2018
8:00 p.m. EST

Atlanta United FC	2–0	Portland Timbers
Martínez 39'; Escobar 54'	Report

Mercedes-Benz Stadium, Atlanta, Georgia
Attendance: 73,019
Referee: Alan Kelly

== Attendance ==
=== Average home attendances ===
As of October 29, 2018

Ranked from highest to lowest average attendance.

Pos.	Team	GP	Cumulative	High	Low	Mean
1	Atlanta United FC	17	901,033	72,243	44,696	53,002
2	Seattle Sounders FC	17	690,893	47,521	39,465	40,641
3	Toronto FC	17	452,675	30,799	23,011	26,628
4	LA Galaxy	17	415,543	27,068	16,231	24,444
5	Minnesota United FC	17	406,342	52,242	18,057	23,902
6	Orlando City SC	17	405,730	25,527	22,337	23,866
7	New York City FC	17	394,583	30,139	18,584	23,211
8	Los Angeles FC	17	374,716	22,716	22,000	22,042
9	Vancouver Whitecaps FC	17	373,089	27,863	17,357	21,946
10	Portland Timbers	17	359,448	21,144	21,144	21,144
11	Sporting Kansas City	17	339,148	21,064	18,508	19,950
12	San Jose Earthquakes	17	323,547	50,743	15,648	19,032
13	New York Red Bulls	17	316,956	25,219	14,768	18,644
14	Real Salt Lake	17	316,286	21,363	16,015	18,605
15	Montreal Impact	17	315,665	26,005	15,485	18,569
16	New England Revolution	17	311,897	36,573	10,547	18,347
17	D.C. United	17	299,803	20,573	5,128	17,635
18	Houston Dynamo	17	287,408	22,320	13,094	16,906
19	Philadelphia Union	17	280,805	19,013	14,795	16,518
20	FC Dallas	17	263,707	19,096	13,147	15,512
21	Colorado Rapids	17	260,660	17,837	10,790	15,333
22	Chicago Fire	17	251,708	21,915	8,551	14,806
23	Columbus Crew	17	211,603	19,121	7,683	12,447
–	Total	391	8,553,245	72,243	5,128	21,875

=== Highest attendances ===
As of October 22, 2018

Regular season

Rank	Home team	Score	Away team	Attendance	Date	Week	Stadium
1	Atlanta United FC	1–1	Seattle Sounders FC	72,243	July 15, 2018	20	Mercedes-Benz Stadium
2	Atlanta United FC	3–1	D.C. United	72,035	March 11, 2018	2	Mercedes-Benz Stadium
3	Atlanta United FC	2–0	Real Salt Lake	72,017	September 22, 2018	30	Mercedes-Benz Stadium
4	Atlanta United FC	4–0	Orlando City SC	71,932	June 30, 2018	18	Mercedes-Benz Stadium
5	Atlanta United FC	2–1	Chicago Fire	71,812	October 22, 2018	34	Mercedes-Benz Stadium
6	Minnesota United FC	1–3	LA Galaxy	52,242	October 21, 2018	33	TCF Bank Stadium
7	San Jose Earthquakes	3–3	LA Galaxy	50,743	June 30, 2018	18	Stanford Stadium
8	Seattle Sounders FC	2–3	Portland Timbers	47,521	June 30, 2018	18	CenturyLink Field
9	Atlanta United FC	3–1	Columbus Crew	45,303	August 19, 2018	25	Mercedes-Benz Stadium
10	Atlanta United FC	5–0	Los Angeles FC	45,207	April 7, 2018	6	Mercedes-Benz Stadium

== Player statistics ==
=== Goals ===
Rank	Player	Club	Goals
1	(Venezuela) Josef Martínez	Atlanta United FC	31
2	(Sweden) Zlatan Ibrahimović	LA Galaxy	22
3	(England) Bradley Wright-Phillips	New York Red Bulls	20
4	(Colombia) Mauro Manotas	Houston Dynamo	19
4	(United States) Gyasi Zardes	Columbus Crew	19
6	(Argentina) Ignacio Piatti	Montreal Impact	16
7	(Hungary) Nemanja Nikolić	Chicago Fire	15
8	(Sierra Leone) Kei Kamara	Vancouver Whitecaps FC	14
8	(Norway) Ola Kamara	LA Galaxy	14
8	(Mexico) Carlos Vela	Los Angeles FC	14
8	(Spain) David Villa	New York City FC	14

=== Hat-tricks ===
Player	Club	Against	Result	Date
(Venezuela) Josef Martínez	Atlanta United FC	Vancouver Whitecaps FC	4–1	March 17
(Senegal) Dominique Badji	Colorado Rapids	Philadelphia Union	3–0	March 31
(Scotland) Johnny Russell	Sporting Kansas City	Vancouver Whitecaps FC	6–0	April 20
(Argentina) Ignacio Piatti	Montreal Impact	Los Angeles FC	3–5	April 21
(Uruguay) Cristian Techera	Vancouver Whitecaps FC	New England Revolution	3–3	May 26
(Venezuela) Josef Martínez	Atlanta United FC	Philadelphia Union	3–1	June 2
(Norway) Adama Diomande	Los Angeles FC	Philadelphia Union	4–1	June 30
(Colombia) Darwin Quintero	Minnesota United FC	Toronto FC	4–3	July 14
(Venezuela) Josef Martínez	Atlanta United FC	D.C. United	3–1	July 21
(Colombia) Michael Barrios	FC Dallas	Sporting Kansas City	3–2	July 28
(Sweden) Zlatan Ibrahimović	LA Galaxy	Orlando City SC	4–3	July 29
(Argentina) Luciano Acosta	D.C. United	Orlando City SC	3–2	August 12
(Croatia) Damir Kreilach	Real Salt Lake	LA Galaxy	6–2	September 1
(England) Bradley Wright-Phillips	New York Red Bulls	D.C. United	3–3	September 16
(United States) Gyasi Zardes	Columbus Crew SC	Minnesota United FC	3–2	October 28

=== Assists ===
Rank	Player	Club	Assists
1	(Czech Republic) Bořek Dočkal	Philadelphia Union	18
2	(Argentina) Luciano Acosta	D.C. United	17
3	(Uruguay) Nicolás Lodeiro	Seattle Sounders FC	16
3	(Argentina) Maximiliano Moralez	New York City FC	16
5	(Italy) Sebastian Giovinco	Toronto FC	15
5	(Colombia) Darwin Quintero	Minnesota United FC	15
7	(Paraguay) Miguel Almirón	Atlanta United FC	14
7	(United States) Julian Gressel	Atlanta United FC	14
7	(Paraguay) Kaku	New York Red Bulls	14
10	(Argentina) Tomás Martínez	Houston Dynamo	13
10	(Argentina) Ignacio Piatti	Montreal Impact	13
10	(Mexico) Carlos Vela	Los Angeles FC	13

=== Shutouts ===
Rank	Player	Club	Shutouts
1	(United States) Luis Robles	New York Red Bulls	14
2	(United States) Tim Melia	Sporting Kansas City	13
3	(Jamaica) Andre Blake	Philadelphia Union	10
3	(United States) Evan Bush	Montreal Impact	10
3	(United States) Sean Johnson	New York City FC	10
3	(United States) Tyler Miller	Los Angeles FC	10
3	(United States) Zack Steffen	Columbus Crew	10
8	(United States) David Bingham	LA Galaxy	8
8	(United States) Brad Guzan	Atlanta United FC	8
10	(United States) Jeff Attinella	Portland Timbers	7
10	(Switzerland) Stefan Frei	Seattle Sounders FC	7
10	(United States) Nick Rimando	Real Salt Lake	7

== Awards ==
=== Individual awards ===
Award	Player	Club
Most Valuable Player	(Venezuela) Josef Martínez	Atlanta United FC
Defender of the Year	(United States) Aaron Long	New York Red Bulls
Goalkeeper of the Year	(United States) Zack Steffen	Columbus Crew SC
Coach of the Year	(Argentina) Gerardo Martino	Atlanta United FC
Rookie of the Year	(United States) Corey Baird	Real Salt Lake
Newcomer of the Year	(Sweden) Zlatan Ibrahimović	LA Galaxy
Comeback Player of the Year	(United States) Gyasi Zardes	Columbus Crew SC
Golden Boot	(Venezuela) Josef Martínez	Atlanta United FC
Fair Play Award	(Georgia (country)) Valeri Qazaishvili	San Jose Earthquakes
Humanitarian of the Year	(United States) Matt Lampson	Minnesota United FC
Goal of the Year	(Sweden) Zlatan Ibrahimović	LA Galaxy
Save of the Year	(Switzerland) Stefan Frei	Seattle Sounders FC

=== Best XI ===
Goalkeeper	Defenders	Midfielders	Forwards
(United States) Zack Steffen, Columbus	(Jamaica) Kemar Lawrence, Red Bulls (United States) Aaron Long, Red Bulls (United States) Chad Marshall, Seattle	(Argentina) Luciano Acosta, D.C. United (Paraguay) Miguel Almirón, Atlanta (Argentina) Ignacio Piatti, Montreal (Mexico) Carlos Vela, LAFC	(Sweden) Zlatan Ibrahimović, LA Galaxy (Venezuela) Josef Martínez, Atlanta (England) Wayne Rooney, D.C. United

=== Player of the Month ===
Month	Player	Club	Stats	Ref
March	(Chile) Felipe Gutiérrez	Sporting Kansas City	5G	
April	(Paraguay) Miguel Almirón	Atlanta United FC	5G, 2A	
May	(United States) Zack Steffen	Columbus Crew	0 GA	
June	(Norway) Adama Diomande	Los Angeles FC	7G	
July	(Venezuela) Josef Martínez	Atlanta United FC	9G, 1A	
August	(Venezuela) Josef Martínez	Atlanta United FC	4G, 1A	
September	(Argentina) Luciano Acosta	D.C. United	4G, 6A	
October	(England) Wayne Rooney	D.C. United	5G	

=== Player and team of the week ===
- **Bold** denotes league player of the week.
- Italics denotes Audi player performance of the week.

Team of the week
Week	Goalkeeper	Defenders	Midfielders	Forwards	Bench	Coach
1	(United States) Miller (LAFC)	(Argentina) Valenzuela (CLB) (England) Elliott (PHI) (Switzerland) Senderos (HOU) (Ghana) Abubakar (CLB)	(Canada) Davies (VAN) (Argentina) Higuaín (CLB) (Iraq) Meram (ORL) (Paraguay) Medina (NYC)	(Honduras) Elis (HOU) (Netherlands) **Hoesen** (SJ)	(United States) Rimando (RSL) (United States) Bedoya (PHI) (Belgium) Ciman (LAFC) (Georgia (country)) Vako (SJ) (United States) Sapong (PHI) (United States) Spector (ORL) (Norway) O. Kamara (LAG)	(Colombia) Wílmer Cabrera (HOU)
2	(United States) Turner (NE)	(United States) Tierney (NE) (Panama) Escobar (NY) (Sweden) Tinnerholm (NYC)	(Paraguay) Medina (NYC) (Chile) Gutiérrez (SKC) (United States) Finlay (MIN) (Germany) Gressel (ATL)	(Uruguay) **Rossi** (LAFC) (Sierra Leone) K. Kamara (VAN) (Mexico) Vela (LAFC)	(New Zealand) Marinovic (VAN) (Iran) Beitashour (LAFC) (United States) Davis (NY) (Paraguay) Almirón (ATL) (Hungary) Sallói (SKC) (Colombia) Rivas (NY) (United States) Zardes (CLB)	(United States) Bob Bradley (LAFC)
3	(United States) Rimando (RSL)	(France) Fanni (MTL) (England) Elliott (PHI) (United States) Zusi (SKC)	(Argentina) Piatti (MTL) (Belgium) Lamah (DAL) (Argentina) Díaz (DAL) (Algeria) Taïder (MTL) (Argentina) Moralez (NYC)	(Venezuela) **J. Martínez** (ATL) (Honduras) Elis (HOU)	(United States) Bush (MTL) (United States) Beasley (HOU) (Chile) Gutiérrez (SKC) (Germany) Gressel (ATL) (Paraguay) Medina (NYC) (Scotland) Nicholson (MIN) (Argentina) L. Acosta (DC)	(France) Patrick Vieira (NYC)
4	(United States) Howard (COL)	(Argentina) Valenzuela (CLB) (United States) Steres (LAG) (New Zealand) Tuiloma (POR)	(Ecuador) Penilla (NE) (United States) Muyl (NY) (Chile) Gutiérrez (SKC) (Argentina) Higuaín (CLB) (Panama) Martínez (CLB)	(England) **Wright-Phillips** (NY) (Libya) Tajouri-Shradi (NYC)	(United States) Johnson (NYC) (Uruguay) Aja (VAN) (United States) Long (NY) (United States) Duncan (NY) (United States) Hayes (DAL) (United States) Caldwell (NE) (Portugal) Santos (CLB)	(United States) Gregg Berhalter (CLB)
5	(United States) Johnson (NYC)	(United States) Opara (SKC) (United States) Parkhurst (ATL) (New Zealand) Wynne (COL)	(Mexico) Vela (LAFC) (Spain) Ilie (SKC) (Germany) Schweinsteiger (CHI) (Ecuador) Penilla (NE)	(Senegal) Badji (COL) (Sweden) **Ibrahimović** (LAG) (United States) Altidore (TOR)	(United States) Turner (NE) (Netherlands) van der Wiel (TOR) (Sweden) Tinnerholm (NYC) (Brazil) Felipe (VAN) (United States) Kljestan (ORL) (Argentina) Blanco (POR) (United States) Dwyer (ORL)	(United States) Jason Kreis (ORL)
6	(United States) **Melia** (SKC)	(United States) Lennon (RSL) (United States) Parkhurst (ATL) (Germany) Schweinsteiger (CHI) (United States) Farrell (NE)	(Germany) Gressel (ATL) (France) Zahibo (NE) (United States) Bedoya (PHI) (Uruguay) Fagúndez (NE)	(Scotland) Russell (SKC) (United States) Dwyer (ORL)	(United States) Tarbell (SJ) (United States) Opara (SKC) (Paraguay) Almirón (ATL) (Argentina) Blanco (POR) (Sweden) Eriksson (SJ) (United States) Picault (PHI) (Hungary) Nikolić (CHI)	(Argentina) Gerardo Martino (ATL)
7	(United States) Clark (DC)	(England) Cole (LAG) (Luxembourg) Chanot (NYC) (Jamaica) **Powell** (POR)	(Argentina) T. Martínez (HOU) (United States) Kljestan (ORL) (United States) Hayes (DAL) (Argentina) Moralez (NYC) (Paraguay) Almirón (ATL)	(Mexico) Vela (LAFC) (Colombia) Quintero (MIN)	(United States) Bendik (ORL) (United States) Cannon (DAL) (England) Price (COL) (Mexico) J. Dos Santos (LAG) (United States) Roldan (SEA) (Paraguay) Kaku (NY) (England) Wright-Phillips (NY)	(France) Patrick Vieira (NYC)
8	(Mexico) Sánchez (CHI)	(United States) Hedges (DAL) (Democratic Republic of the Congo) Mabiala (POR) (France) Dielna (NE)	(Argentina) Piatti (MTL) (France) Croizet (SKC) (Cuba) Alonso (SEA) (Paraguay) Almirón (ATL)	(Honduras) Quioto (HOU) (Scotland) **Russell** (SKC) (United States) Mueller (ORL)	(United States) Maurer (DAL) (Colombia) Medranda (SKC) (Argentina) Blanco (POR) (United States) McCarty (CHI) (Slovakia) Rusnák (RSL) (Peru) Yotún (ORL) (Mexico) Vela (LAFC)	(Venezuela) Giovanni Savarese (POR)
9	(United States) Shuttleworth (MIN)	(United States) Sweat (NYC) (Belgium) Ciman (LAFC) (France) Dielna (NE)	(Paraguay) **Almirón** (ATL) (Peru) Yotún (ORL) (Czech Republic) Dočkal (PHI) (Paraguay) Kaku (NY) (Canada) Davies (VAN)	(Spain) Villa (NYC) (England) Wright-Phillips (NY)	(United States) Bono (TOR) (United States) Farrell (NE) (Brazil) Ibson (MIN) (Germany) Kratz (ATL) (Argentina) Barco (ATL) (United States) Grella (CLB) (Iraq) Meram (ORL)	(United States) Jason Kreis (ORL)
10	(United States) Shuttleworth (MIN)	(Ghana) Abubakar (CLB) (Costa Rica) Calvo (MIN) (United States) Parker (NY)	(Argentina) **Piatti** (MTL) (Paraguay) Kaku (NY) (Peru) Yotún (ORL) (United States) Adams (NY)	(Hungary) Sallói (SKC) (Canada) Jackson-Hamel (MTL) (Italy) Giovinco (TOR)	(United States) Bush (MTL) (Argentina) Valenzuela (CLB) (United States) Kljestan (ORL) (Argentina) Valeri (POR) (Paraguay) Almirón (ATL) (Honduras) Quioto (HOU) (Argentina) Urruti (DAL)	(United States) Jesse Marsch (NY)
11	(United States) Melia (SKC)	(Costa Rica) Waston (VAN) (United States) Parker (NY) (Sweden) Svensson (SEA)	(Argentina) Díaz (DAL) (Canada) Kaye (LAFC) (Slovakia) Rusnák (RSL) (Spain) Ilie (SKC) (Ecuador) Penilla (NE)	(United States) **Zardes** (CLB) (United States) Bunbury (NE)	(United States) Steffen (CLB) (Belgium) Ciman (LAFC) (United States) Opara (SKC) (United States) Bedoya (PHI) (United States) Larentowicz (ATL) (Argentina) Blanco (POR) (United States) Wondolowski (SJ)	(United States) Gregg Berhalter (CLB)
12	(United States) Shuttleworth (MIN)	(Costa Rica) Matarrita (NYC) (Ghana) Mensah (CLB) (Panama) Murillo (NY)	(Canada) Telfer (TOR) (United States) Durkin (DC) (Czech Republic) Dočkal (PHI) (Paraguay) Kaku (NY)	(England) **Wright-Phillips** (NY) (Spain) Villa (NYC) (Honduras) Elis (HOU)	(United States) Meara (NY) (United States) Long (NY) (Paraguay) Paredes (POR) (Colombia) Chará (POR) (Argentina) Moralez (NYC) (Argentina) L. Acosta (DC) (United States) Epps (PHI)	(United States) Jesse Marsch (NY)
13	(United States) González (DAL)	(United States) D. Acosta (RSL) (United States) McKenzie (PHI) (Venezuela) Fuenmayor (HOU) (United States) Williams (CLB)	(United States) M. Ibarra (MIN) (Brazil) Artur (CLB) (Ecuador) Penilla (NE)	(Uruguay) **Techera** (VAN) (Sweden) Armenteros (POR) (Honduras) Elis (HOU)	(United States) Melia (SKC) (United States) McLain (CHI) (United States) Parker (NY) (Uruguay) Silva (RSL) (United States) Arriola (DC) (France) Alessandrini (LAG) (United States) Gordon (CHI)	(Colombia) Wílmer Cabrera (HOU)
14	(United States) Turner (NE)	(United States) D. Acosta (RSL) (United States) Hollingshead (DAL) (United States) Zusi (SKC)	(Argentina) Díaz (DAL) (Paraguay) Almirón (ATL) (Argentina) Higuaín (CLB) (Chile) Vargas (MTL)	(Libya) Tajouri-Shradi (NYC) (Venezuela) **J. Martínez** (ATL) (United States) Bunbury (NE)	(United States) Rimando (RSL) (United States) Glad (RSL) (United States) Ibeagha (NYC) (Spain) Ilie (SKC) (Czech Republic) Dočkal (PHI) (Peru) Reyna (VAN) (United States) Gordon (CHI)	(United States) Mike Petke (RSL)
15	(United States) Guzan (ATL)	(United States) Opara (SKC) (Netherlands) Kappelhof (CHI) (Ghana) Afful (CLB)	(Canada) **Davies** (VAN) (Argentina) T. Martínez (HOU) (Uruguay) Lodeiro (SEA) (Argentina) Moralez (NYC) (Canada) Osorio (TOR)	(Norway) Diomande (LAFC) (Sweden) Ibrahimović (LAG)	(United States) Melia (SKC) (Norway) Skjelvik (LAG) (Democratic Republic of the Congo) Mabiala (POR) (Peru) Callens (NYC) (Brazil) Felipe (VAN) (Argentina) Díaz (DAL) (United States) Wondolowski (SJ)	(United States) Greg Vanney (TOR)
16	(United States) Bush (MTL)	(United States) Kutler (NY) (United States) Parkhurst (ATL) (United States) Hagglund (TOR) (New Zealand) T. Smith (COL)	(Uruguay) Fagúndez (NE) (Serbia) Katai (CHI) (United States) Larentowicz (ATL) (Argentina) Asad (DC)	(Argentina) **Piatti** (MTL) (Netherlands) Hoesen (SJ)	(Switzerland) Frei (SEA) (United States) Parker (NY) (France) Fanni (MTL) (United States) Muyl (NY) (United States) Arriola (DC) (Ecuador) Penilla (NE) (Venezuela) J. Martínez (ATL)	(Argentina) Gerardo Martino (ATL)
17	(United States) Attinella (POR)	(Belgium) Ciman (LAFC) (United States) Long (NY) (United States) McKenzie (PHI)	(Czech Republic) **Dočkal** (PHI) (Canada) Piette (MTL) (United States) Adams (NY) (Albania) Gashi (COL)	(Hungary) Sallói (SKC) (Norway) Berget (NYC) (Serbia) Katai (CHI)	(United States) Tarbell (SJ) (United States) Sweat (NYC) (United States) Bronico (CHI) (Germany) Gressel (ATL) (Paraguay) Kaku (NY) (Slovakia) Rusnák (RSL) (Colombia) Manotas (HOU)	(United States) Jesse Marsch (NY)
18	(United States) Robles (NY)	(Democratic Republic of the Congo) Mabiala (POR) (United States) Hedges (DAL) (New Zealand) T. Smith (COL) (France) Camacho (MTL)	(Paraguay) Almirón (ATL) (Argentina) Valeri (POR) (Venezuela) Sosa (CLB)	(Norway) **Diomande** (LAFC) (Sweden) Ibrahimović (LAG) (Serbia) Katai (CHI)	(United States) Howard (COL) (Jamaica) Lawrence (NY) (United States) McCarty (CHI) (Uruguay) Lodeiro (SEA) (Ecuador) Penilla (NE) (Ghana) Blessing (LAFC) (United States) Wondolowski (SJ)	(France) Rémi Garde (MTL)
19	(Switzerland) Frei (SEA)	(Switzerland) Senderos (HOU) (Argentina) González Pírez (ATL) (Luxembourg) Chanot (NYC)	(Algeria) Taïder (MTL) (Venezuela) Savarino (RSL) (Canada) Kaye (LAFC) (Argentina) Valeri (POR)	(Sweden) Armenteros (POR) (Norway) Diomande (LAFC) (Colombia) **Quintero** (MIN)	(United States) Miller (LAFC) (France) Fanni (MTL) (United States) Glad (RSL) (Canada) Akindele (DAL) (Sierra Leone) K. Kamara (VAN) (Sweden) Ibrahimović (LAG) (Venezuela) J. Martínez (ATL)	(United States) Mike Petke (RSL)
20	(United States) Johnson (NYC)	(Peru) Callens (NYC) (Switzerland) Ziegler (DAL) (United States) Ford (COL)	(Argentina) Piatti (MTL) (Germany) Rzatkowski (NY) (Colombia) Chará (POR) (United States) Arriola (DC) (United States) Pontius (LAG)	(Colombia) Quintero (MIN) (United States) Dwyer (ORL)	(United States) Miller (LAFC) (Cameroon) Nouhou (SEA) (Hungary) Stieber (DC) (Paraguay) **Medina** (NYC) (United States) Lewis (NYC) (France) Alessandrini (LAG) (Jamaica) Burke (PHI)	(Spain) Domè Torrent (NYC)
21	(United States) Shuttleworth (MIN)	(France) Ciani (LAG) (South Korea) Kim (SEA) (France) Fanni (MTL)	(Argentina) Piatti (MTL) (Canada) Osorio (TOR) (United States) Trapp (CLB) (Uruguay) Lodeiro (SEA)	(Colombia) Quintero (MIN) (Venezuela) **J. Martínez** (ATL) (United States) Ramirez (MIN)	(United States) Willis (HOU) (United States) Kallman (MIN) (United States) Parker (NY) (United States) Roldan (SEA) (United States) Davis (NY) (United States) M. Ibarra (MIN) (France) Alessandrini (LAG)	(England) Adrian Heath (MIN)
22	(Switzerland) Frei (SEA)	(Ghana) Afful (CLB) (Democratic Republic of the Congo) Mavinga (TOR) (South Korea) Kim (SEA)	(Colombia) Barrios (DAL) (Italy) Giovinco (TOR) (Czech Republic) Dočkal (PHI) (United States) Canouse (DC) (Canada) Davies (VAN)	(Sweden) **Ibrahimović** (LAG) (Venezuela) J. Martínez (ATL)	(United States) Johnson (NYC) (Georgia (country)) Kashia (SJ) (United States) Hedges (DAL) (Argentina) Moralez (NYC) (United States) Mullins (CLB) (England) Wright-Phillips (NY) (Nigeria) Adi (POR)	(United States) Brian Schmetzer (SEA)
23	(United States) Bush (MTL)	(United States) Castillo (COL) (Georgia (country)) Kashia (SJ) (United States) Opara (SKC)	(Ecuador) Plata (RSL) (Croatia) Kreilach (RSL) (Cuba) Alonso (SEA) (United States) Adams (NY)	(Georgia (country)) **Vako** (SJ) (Venezuela) J. Martínez (ATL) (Italy) Giovinco (TOR)	(United States) Attinella (POR) (United States) Parker (NY) (United States) Larentowicz (ATL) (United States) Busio (SKC) (Argentina) L. Acosta (DC) (Argentina) Valeri (POR) (Austria) Royer (NY)	(Sweden) Mikael Stahre (SJ)
24	(New Zealand) Marinovic (VAN)	(United States) Besler (SKC) (England) Elliott (PHI) (United States) Marshall (SEA)	(Argentina) **L. Acosta** (DC) (United States) K. Acosta (COL) (United States) Adams (NY) (Uruguay) Lodeiro (SEA)	(Libya) Tajouri-Shradi (NYC) (United States) Zardes (CLB) (England) Rooney (DC)	(United States) Howard (COL) (United States) Bush (MTL) (New Zealand) Boxall (MIN) (Argentina) Valenzuela (CLB) (Spain) Rosell (ORL) (Spain) Ilie (SKC) (Argentina) Higuaín (CLB)	(United States) Jim Curtin (PHI)
25	(United States) Miller (LAFC)	(United States) Lovitz (MTL) (England) Elliott (PHI) (United States) Marshall (SEA)	(Argentina) L. Acosta (DC) (Slovakia) Rusnák (RSL) (Chile) Aránguiz (DAL) (United States) Canouse (DC) (Uruguay) Lodeiro (SEA)	(Chile) Rubio (SKC) (Venezuela) Savarino (RSL)	(United States) Putna (RSL) (Costa Rica) Waston (VAN) (United States) Castillo (COL) (United States) Bedoya (PHI) (Austria) Royer (NY) (Paraguay) Villalba (ATL) (United States) Ramirez (LAFC)	(United States) Ben Olsen (DC)
26	(Jamaica) Blake (PHI)	(United States) Sinovic (SKC) (United States) Ibeagha (NYC) (South Korea) Kim (SEA) (Jamaica) Lawrence (NY)	(Peru) Reyna (VAN) (Paraguay) Kaku (NY) (United States) Bradley (TOR)	(Venezuela) Savarino (RSL) (Venezuela) **J. Martínez** (ATL) (Italy) Giovinco (TOR)	(United States) Melia (SKC) (England) Elliott (PHI) (Cuba) Alonso (SEA) (Scotland) Russell (SKC) (United States) Baird (RSL) (Jamaica) Burke (PHI) (Hungary) Nikolić (CHI)	(United States) Greg Vanney (TOR)
27	(United States) Hamid (DC)	(Australia) B. Smith (SEA) (France) Fanni (MTL) (Ghana) Afful (CLB)	(Slovakia) Rusnák (RSL) (Georgia (country)) Vako (SJ) (Cuba) Alonso (SEA) (Argentina) L. Acosta (DC)	(Mexico) Vela (LAFC) (Croatia) **Kreilach** (RSL) (Venezuela) Savarino (RSL)	(United States) Miller (LAFC) (United States) Arriola (DC) (Colombia) Chará (POR) (Peru) Reyna (VAN) (Iraq) Meram (CLB) (Argentina) Piatti (MTL) (United States) Sapong (PHI)	(France) Rémi Garde (MTL)
28	(United States) Melia (SKC)	(United States) Sinovic (SKC) (United States) Birnbaum (DC) (United States) Anibaba (NE) (United States) Valentin (POR)	(Argentina) **Blanco** (POR) (United States) Sands (NYC) (Chile) Gutiérrez (SKC)	(Canada) Wright (NE) (Spain) Villa (NYC) (United States) Ebobisse (POR)	(United States) Knighton (NE) (United States) Hamid (DC) (United States) Howard (COL) (Spain) Rosell (ORL) (United States) Canouse (DC) (Colombia) Chará (POR) (Argentina) Valeri (POR)	(Venezuela) Giovanni Savarese (POR)
29	(United States) Miller (LAFC)	(United States) Lovitz (MTL) (Ghana) Mensah (CLB) (Germany) Gressel (ATL)	(Argentina) Piatti (MTL) (Paraguay) Almirón (ATL) (Argentina) L. Acosta (DC) (Honduras) Elis (HOU)	(Guinea-Bissau) Gerso (SKC) (England) **Wright-Phillips** (NY) (Peru) Ruidíaz (SEA)	(Switzerland) Frei (SEA) (United States) Opara (SKC) (Netherlands) Leerdam (SEA) (Argentina) González Pírez (ATL) (Canada) Osorio (TOR) (Uruguay) Silva (MTL) (Hungary) Nikolić (CHI)	(France) Rémi Garde (MTL)
30	(United States) McCarthy (PHI)	(United States) Zimmerman (LAFC) (United States) Trusty (PHI) (Germany) Gressel (ATL)	(Paraguay) Almirón (ATL) (Colombia) Quintero (MIN) (Argentina) Higuaín (CLB) (Argentina) Urruti (DAL)	(Ecuador) R. Ibarra (MIN) (Norway) O. Kamara (LAG) (England) **Simpson** (PHI)	(United States) Rimando (RSL) (United States) Spector (ORL) (Peru) Polo (POR) (Denmark) Hansen (CLB) (Paraguay) Villalba (ATL) (England) Wright-Phillips (NY) (Venezuela) J. Martínez (ATL)	(United States) Jim Curtin (PHI)
31	(Jamaica) Blake (PHI)	(United States) Glad (RSL) (United States) Parker (NY) (United States) Cannon (DAL)	(Spain) Vázquez (TOR) (Argentina) **L. Acosta** (DC) (United States) Mihailovic (CHI) (Germany) Rzatkowski (NY) (Uruguay) Lodeiro (SEA)	(Sweden) Ibrahimović (LAG) (England) Rooney (DC)	(United States) Hamid (DC) (Jamaica) Lawrence (NY) (United States) Morrow (TOR) (United States) Arriola (DC) (Peru) Ruidíaz (SEA) (Colombia) Rodríguez (MIN) (Colombia) Manotas (HOU)	(United States) Ben Olsen (DC)
32	(United States) Bush (MTL)	(United States) Bello (ATL) (United States) Long (NY) (United States) Rosenberry (PHI)	(Argentina) **Blanco** (POR) (Algeria) Taïder (MTL) (Argentina) Urruti (DAL) (Canada) Teibert (VAN)	(Norway) Diomande (LAFC) (England) Rooney (DC) (United States) Picault (PHI)	(United States) Bingham (LAG) (United States) Zimmerman (LAFC) (Czech Republic) Dočkal (PHI) (United States) Roldan (SEA) (Paraguay) Villalba (ATL) (England) Wright-Phillips (NY) (United States) Bruin (SEA)	(France) Rémi Garde (MTL)
33	(United States) Hamid (DC)	(Brazil) Silva (LAFC) (England) Mancienne (NE) (United States) Miller (MIN)	(Argentina) Asad (DC) (United States) Caldwell (NE) (United States) Canouse (DC) (Mexico) Ulloa (DAL) (United States) Bassett (COL)	(Ecuador) Penilla (NE) (Mexico) **Vela** (LAFC)	(United States) Grinwis (ORL) (United States) Hairston (COL) (United States) Zimmerman (LAFC) (Uruguay) Fagúndez (NE) (France) Boli (COL) (Colombia) Manotas (HOU) (Norway) Diomande (LAFC)	(United States) Bob Bradley (LAFC)
34	(United States) Melia (SKC)	(United States) Marshall (SEA) (United States) Birnbaum (DC) (United States) Besler (SKC)	(Argentina) L. Acosta (DC) (Uruguay) Lodeiro (SEA) (Peru) Yotún (ORL) (Argentina) Blanco (POR)	(Hungary) Sallói (SKC) (Sweden) Ibrahimović (LAG) (England) **Rooney** (DC)	(United States) Robles (NY) (Argentina) Escobar (ATL) (United States) Calvillo (SJ) (Paraguay) Kaku (NY) (Argentina) Piatti (MTL) (United States) Baird (RSL) (Uruguay) Rossi (LAFC)	(United States) Peter Vermes (SKC)
35	(United States) Turner (NE)	(Venezuela) Fuenmayor (HOU) (United States) Parker (NY) (United States) Besler (SKC) (United States) DeLeon (DC)	(Canada) Davies (VAN) (Argentina) Janson (TOR) (United States) Bassett (COL)	(Colombia) Manotas (HOU) (Peru) Ruidíaz (SEA) (United States) **Zardes** (CLB)	(United States) Robles (NY) (Costa Rica) Calvo (MIN) (Italy) Giovinco (TOR) (Honduras) Quioto (HOU) (Hungary) Sallói (SKC) (Norway) O. Kamara (LAG) (Spain) Villa (NYC)	(United States) Chris Armas (NY)

=== Goal of the Week ===
Goal of the Week
Week	Player	Club	Ref
1	(Uruguay) Diego Rossi	Los Angeles FC	
2	(Paraguay) Miguel Almirón	Atlanta United FC	
3	(Venezuela) Josef Martínez	Atlanta United FC	
4	(Argentina) Yamil Asad	D.C. United	
5	(Sweden) Zlatan Ibrahimović	LA Galaxy	
6	(Scotland) Johnny Russell	Sporting Kansas City	
7	(Jamaica) Alvas Powell	Portland Timbers	
8	(Slovakia) Albert Rusnák	Real Salt Lake	
9	(Germany) Kevin Kratz	Atlanta United FC	
10	(Argentina) Ezequiel Barco	Atlanta United FC	
11	(United States) Corey Baird	Real Salt Lake	
12	(Sweden) Samuel Armenteros	Portland Timbers	
13	(Sweden) Samuel Armenteros	Portland Timbers	
14	(Brazil) Ilsinho	Philadelphia Union	
15	(Venezuela) Josef Martínez	Atlanta United FC	
16	(United States) Paul Arriola	D.C. United	
17	(Chile) Diego Rubio	Sporting Kansas City	
18	(Serbia) Aleksandar Katai	Chicago Fire	
19	(Paraguay) Héctor Villalba	Atlanta United FC	
20	(Argentina) Yamil Asad	D.C. United	
21	(United States) Wil Trapp	Columbus Crew	
22	(Canada) Alphonso Davies	Vancouver Whitecaps FC	
23	(United States) Will Bruin	Seattle Sounders FC	
24	(Finland) Jukka Raitala	Montreal Impact	
25	(Slovakia) Albert Rusnák	Real Salt Lake	
26	(Venezuela) Josef Martínez	Atlanta United FC	
27	(Slovakia) Albert Rusnák	Real Salt Lake	
28	Not awarded		
29	(Sweden) Zlatan Ibrahimović	LA Galaxy	
30	(Paraguay) Héctor Villalba	Atlanta United FC	
31	(United States) Djordje Mihailovic	Chicago Fire	
32	(Scotland) Johnny Russell	Sporting Kansas City	
33	Not awarded		
34	(Spain) Víctor Rodríguez	Seattle Sounders FC	
35	(Honduras) Roger Espinoza	Sporting Kansas City	

== Player transfers ==
=== SuperDraft ===
The MLS SuperDraft is an annual event, taking place in January of each year, in which the teams of Major League Soccer select players who have graduated from college or otherwise been signed by the league. The first two rounds of 2018 MLS SuperDraft were held on January 19 in Philadelphia. Rounds three and four of the 2018 SuperDraft were held via conference call on January 21. Los Angeles FC selected João Moutinho with the first overall pick.

=== Allocation ranking ===
The allocation ranking is the mechanism used to determine which MLS club has first priority to acquire a player who is in the MLS allocation list. The MLS allocation list contains select U.S. National Team players and players transferred outside of MLS garnering a transfer fee of at least $500,000. The allocations are ranked in reverse order of finish for the 2017 season, taking playoff performance into account. As an expansion team, Los Angeles FC took the top spot.

Once the club uses its allocation ranking to acquire a player, it drops to the bottom of the list. A ranking can be traded provided that part of the compensation received in return is another club's ranking. At all times each club is assigned one ranking. The rankings reset at the end of each MLS season.

Original ranking	Current ranking	Club	Date allocation used (Rank on that date)	Player signed	Previous club	Ref
3	1	D.C. United				
4	2	Colorado Rapids				
5	3	Minnesota United FC				
11	4	FC Dallas				
7	5	Montreal Impact				
8	6	Philadelphia Union				
9	7	New England Revolution				
10	8	Real Salt Lake				
1	9	Los Angeles FC				
12	10	San Jose Earthquakes				
13	11	Sporting Kansas City				
14	12	Atlanta United FC				
15	13	Chicago Fire				
16	14	New York Red Bulls				
2	15	LA Galaxy				
19	16	New York City FC				
20	17	Houston Dynamo				
21	18	Columbus Crew				
22	19	Seattle Sounders FC				
23	20	Toronto FC				
17	21	Vancouver Whitecaps FC	December 22, 2017 (17)	(Canada) Doneil Henry	(England) West Ham United	
6	22	Orlando City SC	January 30, 2018 (1)	(Spain) Oriol Rosell	(Portugal) Sporting CP	
18	23	Portland Timbers	August 8, 2018 (1)	(United States) Jorge Villafaña	(Mexico) Santos Laguna	

1. On December 10, 2017, FC Dallas acquired the number 1 allocation ranking, $250,000 in general allocation money (GAM), and $250,000 in targeted allocation money (TAM) from Los Angeles FC in exchange for the number 11 allocation ranking and Walker Zimmerman.
2. On January 30, 2018, Orlando City acquired the number 1 allocation ranking from FC Dallas in exchange for the number 6 allocation ranking and $400,000 in targeted allocation money (TAM).
3. On August 8, 2018, Portland acquired the number 1 allocation ranking from LA Galaxy in exchange for the number 16 allocation ranking, $75,000 in general allocation money (GAM), and $100,000 in 2019 targeted allocation money (TAM).
