= 2012 New York Red Bulls season =

New York Red Bulls
2012 season
- General manager: Erik Solér
- Head coach: Hans Backe
- Stadium: Red Bull Arena
- MLS: 4th
- MLS Playoffs: Conference Semifinals
- U.S. Open Cup: Fourth Round
- Top goalscorer: League: Cooper (18); All: Cooper (19)
- Highest home attendance: 25,219 vs Kansas City (October 20)
- Lowest home attendance: 10,286 vs Kansas city (September 19)
- Average home league attendance: 18,281

The 2012 New York Red Bulls season was the club's 18th year of existence as well as its 17th season in Major League Soccer, the top-flight of American soccer.

After a disappointing 2011 season, Red Bulls looked to bounce back to their 2010 form which saw them win the Eastern Conference. In 2011, New York finished fifth place in the conference and tenth overall in MLS, qualifying as the final team for the playoffs. The club lost in the two-legged quarterfinals of the post-season playoffs to the eventual MLS Cup winner Los Angeles Galaxy.

== Team uniform ==
| Home | Home Alternate | Away | Away Alternate | Third |

== Overview ==
=== November 2011 ===
The 2012 season began in earnest for MLS immediately after the 2011 MLS Cup final. The following day clubs submitted their list of players protected from selection by Montreal Impact in the 2011 MLS Expansion Draft held on November 23, 2011. No Red Bull players were chosen by Montreal in the draft. However, on the same day MLS clubs waived players, effectively releasing them from their contracts. Through waivers, New York parted ways with goalkeeper Alex Horwath; defenders Mike Jones, Tyler Lassiter, and Teddy Schneider; and midfielders John Rooney and Marcos Paullo.

One week later, the club declined the 2012 options on goalkeeper Bouna Coundoul, defender Chris Albright, and defender Carlos Mendes, making all three players available for the 2011 MLS Re-Entry Draft. Mendes had been the longest-tenured member of Red Bulls and was the last player remaining from when the franchise was known as New York MetroStars. He ranks among the club's all-time leaders in games and minutes. Mendes was chosen by Columbus Crew in Stage 1 of the Re-Entry Draft on December 5, 2011. Coundoul and Albright were not selected and became free agents.

The same day the club confirmed the status of 2011 Red Bull goalkeeper Greg Sutton, who was also available in the Re-Entry Draft. Sutton had been loaned to then-North American Soccer League side Montreal Impact in July 2011. At season's end, Montreal exercised an option to acquire Sutton's MLS rights but subsequently declined his 2012 option.

=== December 2011 ===
The club signed defender Connor Lade to a Home Grown Player contract on December 5, 2011. The diminutive Lade spent parts of several years with Red Bull Academy. The following week New York announced that it had declined the 2012 contract option on midfielder Stéphane Auvray.

=== January 2012 ===
Red Bulls signed defender John Borrajo from Norwegian side Hamarkameratene on January 5, 2012. Borrajo had spent time at Red Bulls Academy before heading overseas. A much bigger move was confirmed by the club the next day: the short-term loan of star striker Thierry Henry to his former club, English juggernaut Arsenal. The loan lasts until late February 2012.

The club was busy on SuperDraft day despite having only one selection. First, the rumored signing of Swedish defender Markus Holgersson was officially announced. The central defender is expected to step into a starting role for New York. The day's second announcement was the acquisition of forward Kenny Cooper from Portland Timbers in exchange for a first-round pick in the 2013 MLS SuperDraft and allocation money. The addition of Cooper to the forward corps led to speculation about the future of Juan Agudelo with the club. As far as the actual SuperDraft, Red Bulls used its lone selection (#31) to choose goalkeeper Ryan Meara. The first goalkeeper chosen in the 2012 SuperDraft, Meara is considered a good bet to make the squad.

The following week the club drafted three players in the 2012 MLS Supplemental Draft: defender Mike Volk, midfielder Cristian Barreiro, and midfielder Nate Polak. The club also re-signed defender Stephen Keel to a new contract.

On January 19, coach Hans Backe confirmed that goalkeeper Frank Rost would not be returning to the club. The following day oft-injured veteran midfielder Carl Robinson retired and joined the coaching staff of Vancouver Whitecaps FC. These moves freed up one designated player slot (Rost) and two much needed international roster slots for Red Bulls. Early the following week, New York signed goalkeeper Jeremy Vuolo from Finnish side AC Oulu.

January 26 saw the official departure of defender Tim Ream to Bolton Wanderers of the English Premier League after a month-long transfer saga. A virtual unknown when selected by red Bulls in the second round of the 2010 MLS SuperDraft, Ream established himself as a starter from day one, finished his first season as a finalist for the 2010 MLS Rookie of the Year award, and secured a place with the United States men's national soccer team. Bolton paid a record transfer fee for an American defender, reportedly in the $3 million range, to sign Ream. Red Bulls will receive 2/3 of the transfer amount and can use $650,000 of that as allocation money to override the MLS salary cap.

New York put some of the Ream transfer funds to immediate use when four days later the club traded allocation money to Chicago Fire for the MLS rights to defender Wilman Conde, whom New York signed immediately. Conde is expected to start in central defense with fellow January signing Markus Holgersson.

Red Bulls finished the month by re-signing stalwart midfielder Joel Lindpere to a multi-year contract on January 31. The club Most Valuable Player in 2010, Lindpere started all 37 MLS matches in 2011.

=== February ===
The first signing by the club after the start of training camp was draft pick goalkeeper Ryan Meara on February 6. Four days later New York signed young Icelandic midfielder Victor Pálsson to the squad.

The club surprised fans on February 17 by waiving second-year homegrown players Matt Kassel and Šaćir Hot. While 2012 playing time for the two was likely to be limited, the young players were just signed from Red Bulls Academy in 2011 and did not count against the team's salary cap. Also, team captain Thierry Henry returned from his short-term loan to Arsenal the same day that Kassel and Hot were waived.

=== March ===
Pre-season concluded in early March with the status of some key players still unresolved. Forward Luke Rodgers was still stuck in England unable to obtain a work visa to return to the United States; newly acquired defender Wilman Conde picked up an injury leaving his status for the first month of the regular season unknown; and forward Juan Agudelo was away from the club for an extended period as he trained with the U.S. Under-23 squad.

In the days just before the regular season began, New York made official the signings of defender Tyler Ruthven, midfielder Brandon Barklage and forwards José Angulo and Jhonny Arteaga. Later in the month the club signed midfielder Ryan Maduro to the roster.

The season started poorly with a 2–1 defeat at FC Dallas on March 11, 2012. A sluggish start led to a 2-goal deficit at the hour mark. The introduction of Kenny Cooper sparked some life into the club and the Red Bull substitute scored late in the match to close the final margin to one. The following week Red Bulls had to travel to Real Salt Lake. Another sub-par performance resulted in a 2–0 defeat.

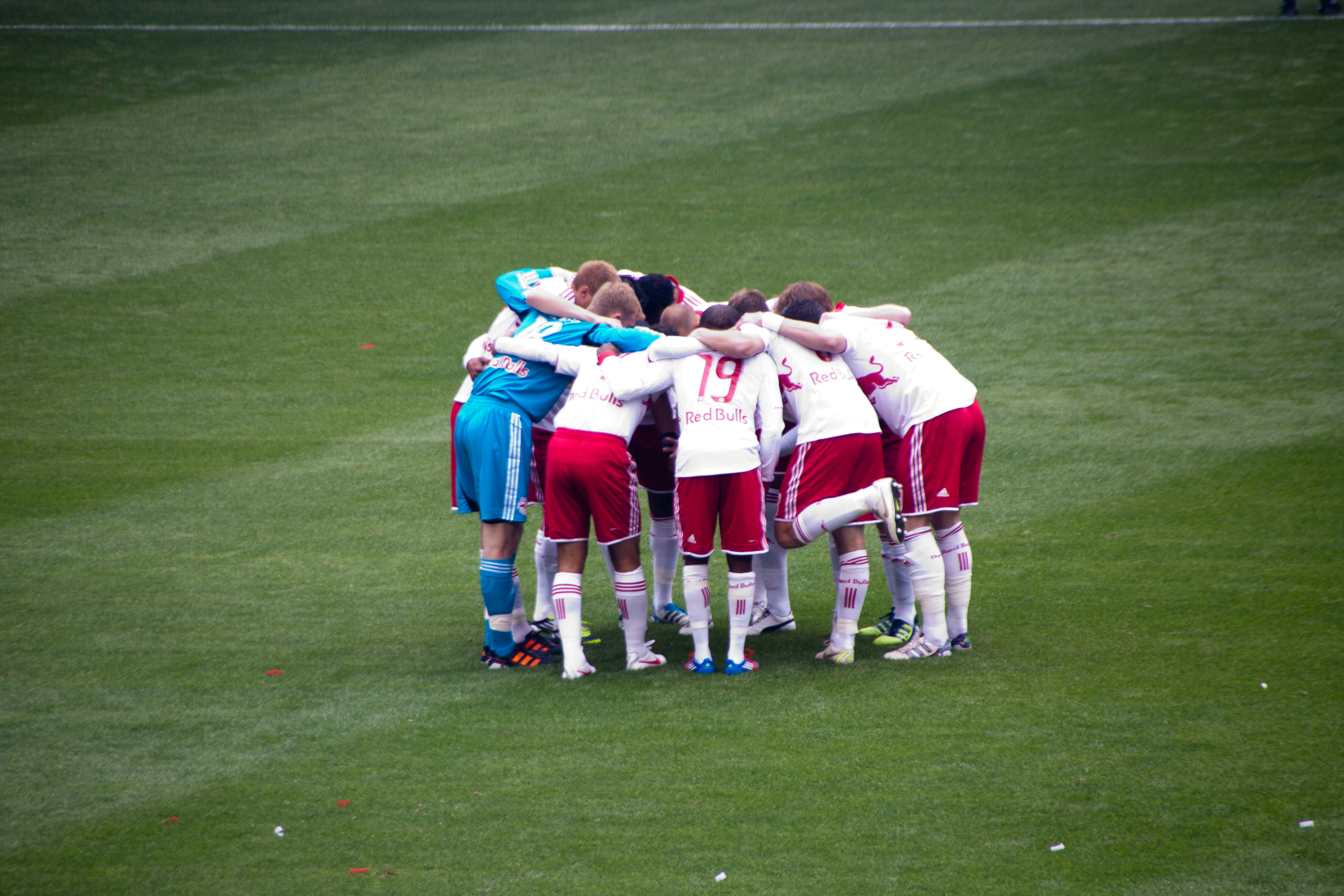
New York Red Bulls players huddle up during their home opener against the Colorado Rapids.

On March 25, New York Red Bulls home opener, the team beat the Colorado Rapids 4–1 in front of 21,024 supporters. Thierry Henry scored two goals and picked up an assist, winning him the MLS Player of the Week award. Strike partner Kenny Cooper added two goals as well. A week after the performance in home opener, Red Bulls host Montreal Impact in Red Bull Arena. The scoreline reads 2–2 at half time. Thierry Henry added 2 goals and a back-heel assist in the second half, which earn him his first-ever MLS hat trick since joining New York Red Bulls. He was again given the MLS Player of the Week for his performance. Also, his hat trick against Impact put him to the top of MLS Golden Boot race with 5 goals.

Away from the field, the end of March was not kind to New York. Striker Juan Agudelo injured his knee while with the U.S. U-23 team during Olympic qualifying and surgery was required. The time frame for his return to Red Bulls was 6 weeks. Worse still, the club announced on March 30 that English striker Luke Rodgers was denied a work visa to enter the United States. As a result, the club transferred Rodgers to Lillestrøm SK of Norway. The stocky Englishman had become a fan favorite during the 2011 season due to his work ethic and goal scoring abilities.

MLS Results for March: 2 victories, 0 draws, 2 losses; 6 points
MLS Results Season-to-Date: 2 victories, 0 draws, 2 losses; 6 points, 2nd in Eastern Conference (MLS) through 4 matches

=== April ===
On April 5, Thierry Henry received the MLS Player of the Month award for his outstanding performance in March. He received 17 out of 25 media votes, beating the second-placed Joe Cannon by big margin. Team captain Henry seemed no sign to stop his goal-scoring streak by adding 2 goals and 1 assist against Columbus Crew at Crew Stadium on April 7. His brace maintains him as the leader in MLS Golden Boot race with 7 goals in 5 games. His strike partner Kenny Cooper and Chris Wondolowski are not far behind with 6 goals each. History has been made when Thierry Henry was awarded another MLS Player of the Week, making it three consecutive Player of the Week for the striker.

On April 14, the Red Bulls hosted San Jose Earthquakes and played to a 2–2 draw. The game featured the three leading MLS goal scorers at the time (Henry, Cooper, and Wondolowski of the Earthquakes). Henry set up Cooper to open the scoring only five minutes into the match. Dax McCarty scored for the first time in his career, and Wondolowski scored the tying goal for San Jose. A week later, Red Bulls travelled to Washington to face D.C. United. The home team controlled the play in the rain and won 4–1. Henry scored on a free kick, but not until after Chris Pontius scored three times and Nick DeLeon scored once for D.C. United.

New York hosted the New England Revolution on April 28 and posted their first clean sheet of the year in a 1-0 win. Henry scored the eventual deciding goal for the Red Bulls in the seventh minute, but would leave the game in the first half with a hamstring injury. The Red Bulls young, inexperienced defense and rookie goalkeeper Ryan Meara were able to make Henry's goal stand, and the Red Bulls snapped their two-game winless streak.

MLS Results for April: 2 victories, 1 draws, 1 losses
MLS Results Season-to-Date: 4 victories, 1 draws, 3 losses; 13 points, 3rd in Eastern Conference (MLS) through 8 matches

=== May ===
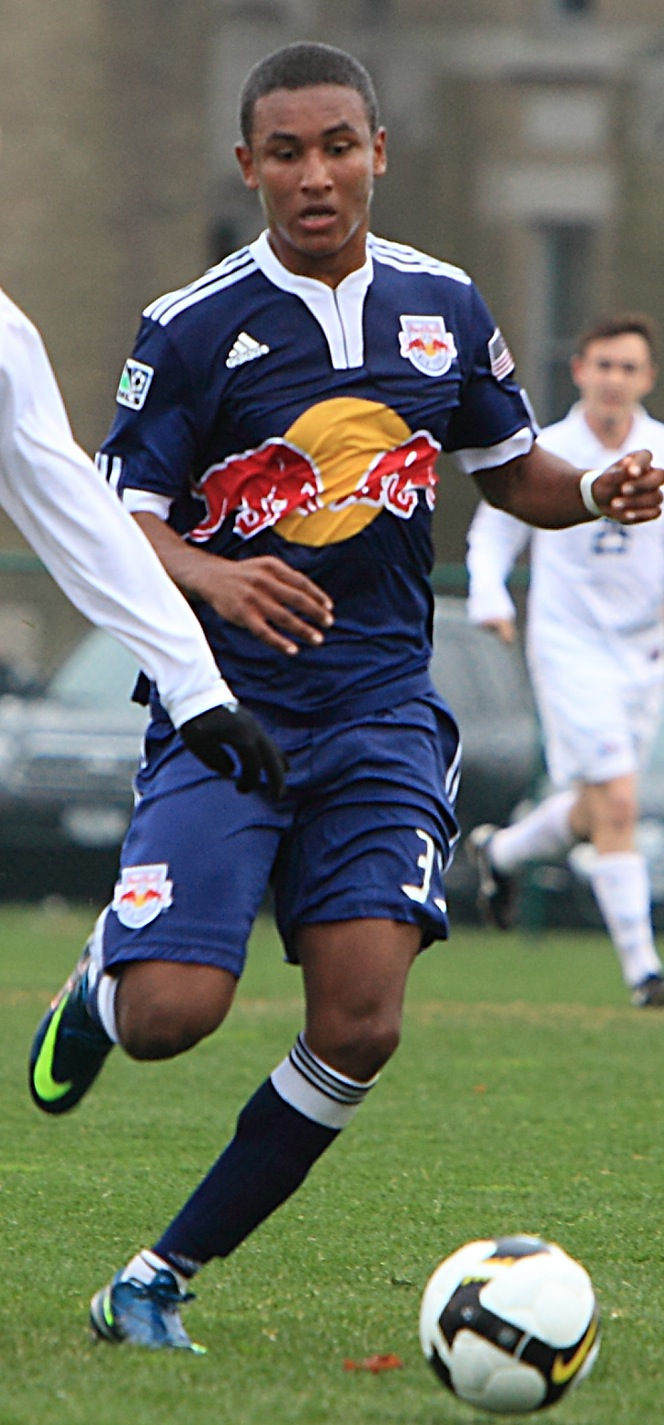
Juan Agudelo was traded in May for defenseman Heath Pearce.

The Red Bulls began May without their leading scorer, Henry, and a "makeshift" defense. They traveled to California for a match against Los Angeles Galaxy on May 5. Joel Lindpere scored the only goal of the game for the Red Bulls while the defense kept Galaxy from scoring en route to a 1-0 win. The Red Bulls then had to play on short rest on May 9 at home against the Houston Dynamo. For the third straight game, New York was able to score early and play tight defense to win 1–0. The goal was scored by forward Cooper.

On Sunday, May 13, New York traveled to Pennsylvania to play the Philadelphia Union in their third game in eight days. Still without Henry and Rafael Márquez, the Red Bulls were able to win the match 3–2 in comeback fashion. New York scored first on a goal from Lindpere in the 17th minute, but Lionard Pajoy scored the next two to give Philadelphia a 2–1 lead. The lead would not hold, however. Philadelphia was forced to play with ten men after Freddy Adu was sent off late in the first half, and New York was able to come back to win. After a goal by Markus Holgersson in the 68th minute, Cooper netted the game winner in the 78th minute. The win was New York's fourth and moved them into first place in the Eastern Conference.

On May 17, New York traded up-and-coming striker Juan Agudelo for defensemen Heath Pearce of Chivas USA. Agudelo, a Red Bulls Academy product, played little so far in his career with New York. He had no goals in 2012 and six in 2011 in 12 starts. Pearce had 35 caps for the US National team up to this point in his career.

The Red Bulls traveled to Montreal to face the Impact on May 19. The Red Bulls were able to end Montreal's season-long unbeaten streak at home by winning 2-1. After Cooper scored on a penalty kick in the first half, Dane Richards scored on a rebound opportunity in the second half while the Red Bull were playing with ten men. On short rest, New York would host Chivas USA on May 23 and face the recently traded Agudelo. Juan Pablo Ángel scored first for Chivas in the 47th minute, but Cooper answered in the 56th to tie the game when he converted a low cross from Richards into the box. New York was unable to find a winner despite being able to apply pressure for much of the rest of the game. The draw snapped the Red Bull's five-game win streak—their longest in nine years.

MLS Results for May: 4 victories, 1 draws, 0 losses
MLS Results Season-to-Date: 8 victories, 2 draws, 3 losses; 26 points, 1st in Eastern Conference (MLS) through 13 matches

=== September ===
Team captain Thierry Henry shone in the matches against Columbus Crew and Toronto FC, which earned him another two MLS Player of the Week. He provided two goals and one assist against Columbus Crew with a goal scoring directly off the corner in second half stoppage time. The legendary striker scored an assist hat-trick before scoring a 25 yards one-time chipped shot against Toronto FC.

MLS Results Season-to-Date: 15 victories, 8 draws, 8 losses; 53 points, 2nd in Eastern Conference (MLS) through 31 matches

== Team information ==
=== Squad ===
As of August 17, 2012.

| No. | Name | Nationality | Position | Date of birth (age) | Previous club |
Goalkeepers
| 18 | Ryan Meara | (United States) | GK | November 15, 1990 (aged 21) | (United States) Fordham University |
| 24 | Jeremy Vuolo | (United States) | GK | September 5, 1987 (aged 24) | (Finland) AC Oulu |
| 31 | Luis Robles | (United States) | GK | May 11, 1984 (aged 27) | (Germany) Karlsruher SC |
| 88 | Bill Gaudette | (Puerto Rico) | GK | September 14, 1981 (aged 30) | (United States) Los Angeles Galaxy |
Defenders
| 2 | Wilman Conde | (Colombia) | CB | August 29, 1982 (aged 29) | (Mexico) Club Atlas |
| 3 | Heath Pearce | (United States) | LB | August 13, 1984 (aged 27) | (United States) Chivas USA |
| 4 | Rafael Márquez | (Mexico) | CB | February 13, 1979 (aged 33) | (Spain) Barcelona |
| 5 | Markus Holgersson | (Sweden) | CB | April 16, 1985 (aged 26) | (Sweden) Helsingborg |
| 7 | Roy Miller | (Costa Rica) | LB | November 24, 1984 (aged 27) | (Norway) Rosenborg |
| 12 | John Borrajo | (United States) | RB | June 2, 1987 (aged 24) | (Norway) Hamarkameratene |
| 15 | Tyler Ruthven | (United States) | CB | July 18, 1988 (aged 23) | (United States) Atlanta |
| 22 | Stephen Keel | (United States) | CB | April 11, 1983 (aged 28) | (United States) Portland Timbers |
| 25 | Brandon Barklage | (United States) | RB | November 2, 1986 (aged 25) | (United States) D.C. United |
Midfielders
| 6 | Teemu Tainio | (Finland) | CDM | November 27, 1979 (aged 32) | (Netherlands) Ajax |
| 8 | Jan Gunnar Solli | (Norway) | MF | April 19, 1981 (aged 30) | (Norway) Brann |
| 10 | Lloyd Sam | (England) | MF | September 27, 1984 (aged 27) | (England) Notts County |
| 11 | Dax McCarty | (United States) | CM | April 30, 1987 (aged 24) | (United States) D.C. United |
| 16 | Connor Lade | (United States) | MF | November 16, 1989 (aged 22) | (United States) St. John's University |
| 17 | Tim Cahill | (Australia) | CAM | December 6, 1979 (aged 32) | (England) Everton |
| 20 | Joel Lindpere | (Estonia) | LM | October 5, 1981 (aged 30) | (Norway) Tromsø |
| 44 | Victor Pálsson | (Iceland) | CDM | April 30, 1991 (aged 20) | (Scotland) Hibernian |
Forwards
| 9 | Sébastien Le Toux | (France) | RW | January 10, 1984 (aged 28) | (United States) Vancouver Whitecaps FC |
| 14 | Thierry Henry | (France) | ST | August 17, 1977 (aged 34) | (Spain) Barcelona |
| 27 | Jhonny Arteaga | (Colombia) | ST | November 24, 1986 (aged 25) | (United States) F.C. New York |
| 33 | Kenny Cooper | (United States) | ST | October 21, 1984 (aged 27) | (United States) Portland Timbers |
| 99 | José Angulo | (Colombia) | ST | January 13, 1988 (aged 24) | (United States) Harrisburg City Islanders |

== Player movement ==
=== Transfers ===
==== In ====
| Date | Player | Position | Previous club | Fee/notes | Ref |
|---|---|---|---|---|---|
| December 5, 2011 | (United States) Connor Lade | DF | (United States) St. John's University | Home Grown Player | NYRB.com |
| January 5, 2012 | (United States) John Borrajo | DF | (Norway) Hamarkameratene | Free | NYRB.com |
| January 12, 2012 | (Sweden) Markus Holgersson | DF | (Sweden) Helsingborg | Free | NYRB.com |
| January 12, 2012 | (United States) Kenny Cooper | FW | (United States) Portland Timbers | Acquired for a first-round 2013 MLS SuperDraft pick and allocation money | NYRB.com |
| January 25, 2012 | (United States) Jeremy Vuolo | GK | (Finland) AC Oulu | Undisclosed | NYRB.com |
| January 30, 2012 | (Colombia) Wilman Conde | DF | (Mexico) Atlas | Free transfer after MLS rights acquired from (United States) Chicago Fire for allocation money | NYRB.com |
| February 6, 2012 | (United States) Ryan Meara | GK | (United States) Fordham University | SuperDraft, round 2 | NYRB.com |
| February 10, 2012 | (Iceland) Victor Pálsson | MF | (Scotland) Hibernian | Free | NYRB.com |
| March 5, 2012 | (United States) Tyler Ruthven | DF | (United States) Atlanta Silverbacks | Free | NYRB.com |
| March 5, 2012 | (United States) Brandon Barklage | MF | (United States) D.C. United | Free | NYRB.com |
| March 5, 2012 | (Colombia) Jhonny Arteaga | FW | (United States) F.C. New York | Free | NYRB.com |
| March 19, 2012 | (United States) Ryan Maduro | MF | Unattached | Free | NYRB.com |
| May 17, 2012 | (United States) Heath Pearce | DF | (United States) Chivas USA | Acquired with allocation money and future considerations for Juan Agudelo | NYRB.com |
| July 13, 2012 | (Puerto Rico) Bill Gaudette | GK | (United States) Los Angeles Galaxy | Acquired for a second-round 2014 Supplemental Draft pick | NYRB.com |
| July 13, 2012 | (France) Sébastien Le Toux | FW | (Canada) Vancouver Whitecaps FC | Acquired for Dane Richards and allocation money | NYRB.com |
| July 26, 2012 | (Australia) Tim Cahill | MF | (England) Everton F.C. | Undisclosed; reportedly $1.55 million | NYRB.com |
| July 31, 2012 | (Nigeria) Babajide Ogunbiyi | DF | (Denmark) Viborg FF | Undisclosed | NYRB.com |
| August 8, 2012 | (United States) Luis Robles | GK | (Germany) Karlsruher SC | Via MLS allocation order | NYRB.com |
| August 16, 2012 | (England) Lloyd Sam | MF | (England) Notts County | Undisclosed | NYRB.com |

==== Out ====
| Date | Player | Position | Destination club | Fee/notes | Ref |
|---|---|---|---|---|---|
| November 23, 2011 | (United States) Alex Horwath | GK | (United States) Wilmington Hammerheads | Waived; free transfer | MLSSoccer.com |
| November 23, 2011 | (United States) Tyler Lassiter | DF | (United States) Wilmington Hammerheads | Waived; free transfer | MLSSoccer.com |
| November 23, 2011 | (United States) Teddy Schneider | DF | None | Waived | MLSSoccer.com |
| November 23, 2011 | (United States) Mike Jones | DF | (Denmark) FC Hjørring | Waived; free transfer | MLSSoccer.com FCHjørring.dk |
| November 23, 2011 | (England) John Rooney | MF | (United States) Orlando City | Waived; free transfer | MLSSoccer |
| November 23, 2011 | (Brazil) Marcos Paullo | MF | (Brazil) Guarani EC | Waived; free transfer | MLSSoccer.com |
| November 29, 2011 | (Canada) Greg Sutton | GK | (Canada) Montreal Impact | Terms unknown | MetroFanatic.com |
| November 30, 2011 | (United States) Chris Albright | DF | (United States) Philadelphia Union | Option declined; free transfer | NYRB.com |
| November 30, 2011 | (Senegal) Bouna Coundoul | GK | (Finland) Vaasan Palloseura | Option declined; free transfer | NYRB.com |
| December 5, 2011 | (United States) Carlos Mendes | DF | (United States) Columbus Crew | 2011 MLS Re-Entry Draft, Stage 1 | theCrew.com |
| December 13, 2011 | (Guadeloupe) Stéphane Auvray | MF | (Singapore) Brunei DPMM FC | Option declined | SoccerbyIves |
| January 19, 2012 | (Germany) Frank Rost | GK | None | Released; subsequently retired | MLSSoccer.com |
| January 20, 2012 | (Wales) Carl Robinson | MF | None | Retired | Vancouver Whitecaps |
| January 26, 2012 | (United States) Tim Ream | DF | (England) Bolton Wanderers | Undisclosed; reportedly $2.75M-$3M | NYRB.com |
| February 17, 2012 | (United States) Matt Kassel | MF | (United States) Pittsburgh Riverhounds | Waived; free transfer | NYRB.com |
| February 17, 2012 | (United States) Šaćir Hot | DF | (Germany) KSV Hessen Kassel | Waived | NYRB.com |
| March 30, 2012 | (England) Luke Rodgers | FW | (Norway) Lillestrøm SK | Free transfer after U.S. visa denied | NYPost.com/NYRB.com |
| May 17, 2012 | (United States) Juan Agudelo | FW | (United States) Chivas USA | Traded for Heath Pearce, allocation money, and future considerations | NYRB.com |
| July 13, 2012 | (Jamaica) Dane Richards | MF | (Canada) Vancouver Whitecaps FC | Traded with allocation money for Sébastien Le Toux | NYRB.com |
| July 28, 2012 | (United States) Ryan Maduro | MF | (United States) Real Boston Rams | Waived; free transfer | NYRB.com |
| July 30, 2012 | (Morocco) Mehdi Ballouchy | MF | (United States) San Jose Earthquakes | Traded for a conditional pick in the 2013 MLS SuperDraft and a 2013 international roster slot | NYRB.com |
| August 17, 2012 | (Nigeria) Babajide Ogunbiyi | DF | (Denmark) FC Hjørring | Released after failing physical | NYRB.com |

=== Loans ===
==== Out ====
| Start Date | End Date | Player | Position | Loaned to | Fee/notes | Ref |
|---|---|---|---|---|---|---|
| January 6, 2012 | February 17, 2012 | (France) Thierry Henry | FW | (England) Arsenal | Loan expired February 17, 2012 | NYRB.com |
| May 29, 2012 | August 18, 2012 | (United States) Corey Hertzog | FW | (United States) Wilmington Hammerheads | Loan through the end of the USL Pro season | NYRB.com NYRB.com |

== Club ==
| Position | Staff |
|---|---|
| Sporting Director | (Norway) Erik Solér |
| Head Coach | (Sweden) Hans Backe |
| Assistant Coach | (Norway) Jan Halvor Halvorsen |
| Individual Development Coach | (United States) Mike Petke |
| Goalkeeping Coach | (United States) Todd Hoffard |
| Technical Director | (Brazil) Ricardo Campos |
| Athletic Trainer | |
| Strength & Conditioning Coach | (United States) Scott Piri |
| Asst. Strength & Conditioning Coach | (United States) Jeremy Holsopple |
| Team Administrator | (Spain) Juan Romero |
| Asst. Athletic Trainer | (United States) Michelle Lafiosca |
| Equipment Manager | (Colombia) Fernando Ruiz |
| Asst. Equipment Manager | (United States) Sean Ruiz |
| Massage Therapist | (United States) Traci Snyder |

Last updated: August 21, 2011
Source: New York Red Bulls Official Website

== Team stats ==
| No. | Pos. | Name | Total | | | MLS | | | U.S. Open Cup | | | Discipline | | | Notes |
| No. | Pos. | Name | Apps | Goals | Assists | Apps | Goals | Assists | Apps | Goals | Assists | Yellow card | Yellow-red card | Red card | Notes |
|---|---|---|---|---|---|---|---|---|---|---|---|---|---|---|---|
| 18 | GK | (United States) Ryan Meara | 20 | 0 | 0 | 18 | 0 | 0 | 2 | 0 | 0 | 0 | 0 | 0 | |
| 24 | GK | (United States) Jeremy Vuolo | 0 | 0 | 0 | 0 | 0 | 0 | 0 | 0 | 0 | 0 | 0 | 0 | |
| 2 | CB | (Colombia) Wilman Conde | 19 | 1 | 1 | 17 | 1 | 1 | 2 | 0 | 0 | 0 | 0 | 0 | |
| 3 | LB | (United States) Heath Pearce | 22 | 3 | 0 | 20 | 2 | 0 | 2 | 1 | 0 | 0 | 0 | 0 | |
| 5 | CB | (Sweden) Markus Holgersson | 37 | 3 | 0 | 33 | 3 | 0 | 2 | 0 | 0 | 2 | 0 | 0 | |
| 7 | LB | (Costa Rica) Roy Miller | 20+6 | 0 | 4 | 20+6 | 0 | 4 | 0 | 0 | 0 | 0 | 0 | 0 | |
| 8 | MF | (Norway) Jan Gunnar Solli | 26 | 3 | 3 | 24 | 3 | 2 | 2 | 0 | 1 | 1 | 0 | 0 | |
| 12 | RB | (United States) John Borrajo | 1+2 | 0 | 0 | 1 | 0 | 0 | 0+2 | 0 | 0 | 0 | 0 | 0 | |
| 15 | CB | (United States) Tyler Ruthven | 4+1 | 0 | 0 | 4+1 | 0 | 0 | 0 | 0 | 0 | 0 | 0 | 0 | |
| 16 | MF | (United States) Connor Lade | 26+4 | 2 | 1 | 24+4 | 0 | 1 | 2 | 2 | 0 | 1 | 0 | 0 | |
| 22 | CB | (United States) Stephen Keel | 6+4 | 0 | 0 | 6+3 | 0 | 0 | 0+1 | 0 | 0 | 1 | 0 | 0 | |
| 4 | CB | (Mexico) Rafael Márquez | 17+2 | 0 | 2 | 15+2 | 0 | 2 | 0 | 0 | 0 | 2 | 0 | 0 | |
| 6 | CM/DM | (Finland) Teemu Tainio | 6+11 | 0 | 0 | 5+11 | 0 | 0 | 0 | 0 | 0 | 1 | 0 | 0 | Source |
| – | MF | (Morocco) Mehdi Ballouchy | 12+6 | 1 | 4 | 10+6 | 1 | 2 | 2 | 0 | 2 | 3 | 0 | 0 | |
| 11 | CM/DM | (United States) Dax McCarty | 37 | 3 | 2 | 35 | 3 | 1 | 2 | 0 | 1 | 5 | 0 | 0 | |
| – | MF | (United States) Ryan Maduro | 0+1 | 0 | 0 | 0 | 0 | 0 | 0+1 | 0 | 0 | 0 | 0 | 0 | |
| 20 | LM | (Estonia) Joel Lindpere | 28+8 | 5 | 3 | 28+8 | 5 | 3 | 0 | 0 | 0 | 3 | 0 | 0 | |
| 25 | RB | (United States) Brandon Barklage | 18+4 | 2 | 2 | 16+4 | 2 | 2 | 2 | 0 | 0 | 0 | 0 | 0 | |
| 44 | DM | (Iceland) Victor Pálsson | 4+13 | 0 | 0 | 4+12 | 0 | 0 | 0+1 | 0 | 0 | 2 | 1 | 0 | |
| 14 | ST | (France) Thierry Henry | 26+1 | 15 | 5 | 26+1 | 15 | 5 | 0 | 0 | 0 | 0 | 0 | 0 | |
| – | RW | (Jamaica) Dane Richards | 16 | 1 | 2 | 16 | 1 | 2 | 0 | 0 | 0 | 5 | 0 | 0 | |
| 27 | ST | (Colombia) Jhonny Arteaga | 2+6 | 0 | 0 | 0+6 | 0 | 0 | 2 | 0 | 0 | 1 | 0 | 0 | |
| 33 | ST | (United States) Kenny Cooper | 29+8 | 19 | 1 | 27+8 | 18 | 1 | 2 | 1 | 0 | 2 | 0 | 0 | |
| 99 | ST | (Colombia) José Angulo | 0 | 0 | 0 | 0 | 0 | 0 | 0 | 0 | 0 | 0 | 0 | 0 | |
| – | ST | (United States) Juan Agudelo | 1+3 | 0 | 0 | 1+3 | 0 | 0 | 0 | 0 | 0 | 0 | 0 | 0 | |
| Total | | | 18 | 35 | 28 | 16 | 31 | 26 | 2 | 4 | 4 | 30 | 1 | 0 | |

Italic: denotes no longer with club.

Updated as of June 24.

== Match results ==
=== Pre-season ===
Kickoff times are in EST.

| February 7, 2012 Pre-season | Dallas | 0–2 | New York | Cancún, Mexico |
| 13:30 | Shea (yellow card) 41'; Guarda (yellow card) 48' | Report | Cooper 33'; Barklage (yellow card) 82'; Hertzog 90' (pen.) |

| February 11, 2012 Pre-season | Mérida | 1–1 | New York | Cancún, Mexico |
| 16:00 | Noya 53'; Uscanga (yellow card) 58'; Charles (yellow card) 62' | Report | Pálsson (yellow card) 50'; Maduro (yellow card) 54'; Lade 80' |

| February 14, 2012 Pre-season | Estudiantes Tecos | 1–1 | New York | Zapopan, Mexico |
| 21:00 | Pereyra 34' | Report | Cooper 28'; Márquez (yellow card) 51'; Pálsson (yellow card) 77'; Miller (red card) 82'; Agudelo (yellow card) 87' | Stadium: Estadio Tres de Marzo |

| February 23, 2012 Red Bull Reto del Sol | Pumas UNAM | 0–0 | New York | Phoenix, Arizona |
| 22:00 | Orrantía (yellow card) 47'; Velarde (yellow card) 87' | Report | | Stadium: Chase Field; Attendance: 14,597; Referee: Allen Chapman |

==== Desert Diamond Cup ====
===== Standings =====
| Pos | Team | Pld | W | L | D | GF | GA | GD | Pts |
|---|---|---|---|---|---|---|---|---|---|
| 1 | New England Revolution | 3 | 3 | 0 | 0 | 7 | 3 | +4 | 9 |
| 2 | LA Galaxy | 3 | 1 | 2 | 0 | 5 | 5 | 0 | 3 |
| 3 | New York Red Bulls | 3 | 1 | 2 | 0 | 2 | 4 | −2 | 3 |
| 4 | Real Salt Lake | 3 | 1 | 2 | 0 | 2 | 4 | −2 | 3 |

===== Matches =====
| February 22, 2012 2012 Desert Diamond Cup | Real Salt Lake | 1–0 | New York | Tucson, Arizona |
| 22:00 | Paulo Jr. 75' | Report | Alvarez (yellow card) 33' | Stadium: Kino Stadium; Attendance: 5,547 |

| February 25, 2012 2012 Desert Diamond Cup | New England | 2–0 | New York | Tucson, Arizona |
| 22:00 | Lechner (yellow card) 56'; Smith (yellow card) 67'; Rowe 77', 84' | Report | Ruthven (yellow card) 16'; Conde (yellow card) 32' | Stadium: Kino Stadium; Attendance: 8,574; Referee: Tyler Ploeger |

| February 29, 2012 2012 Desert Diamond Cup | Los Angeles | 1–2 | New York | Tucson, Arizona |
| 22:00 | Beckham (yellow card) 53'; Sarvas 78' | Report | Keel (yellow card) 28'; Cooper 31'; Henry 62' | Stadium: Kino Stadium; Attendance: 6,212; Referee: Ismail Elfath |

| March 3, 2012 2012 Desert Diamond Cup | Real Salt Lake | 1–0 | New York | Tucson, Arizona |
| 20:00 | Wingert 28'; Tanaka (yellow card) 76' | Report | Márquez (yellow card) 77'; Miller (yellow card) 78' | Stadium: Kino Stadium; Referee: Jasen Anno |

=== Friendlies ===
| July 31, 2012 New York Invitational | New York | 1–2 | Tottenham Hotspur | Harrison, New Jersey |
| 19:00 EDT | Cooper 8' (pen.) | Report | Bale 59'; Sigurðsson 64' | Stadium: Red Bull Arena; Attendance: 21,701; Referee: Niko Bratsis |

=== Major League Soccer ===
==== Eastern Conference table ====
| Pos | Team | Pld | W | L | T | GF | GA | GD | Pts | Qualification |
|---|---|---|---|---|---|---|---|---|---|---|
| 1 | Sporting Kansas City | 34 | 18 | 7 | 9 | 42 | 27 | +15 | 63 | Qualification for the conference semifinals |
| 2 | D.C. United | 34 | 17 | 10 | 7 | 53 | 43 | +10 | 58 | Qualification for the conference semifinals |
| 3 | New York Red Bulls | 34 | 16 | 9 | 9 | 57 | 46 | +11 | 57 | Qualification for the conference semifinals |
| 4 | Chicago Fire | 34 | 17 | 11 | 6 | 46 | 41 | +5 | 57 | Qualification for the knockout round |
| 5 | Houston Dynamo | 34 | 14 | 9 | 11 | 48 | 41 | +7 | 53 | Qualification for the knockout round |
| 6 | Columbus Crew | 34 | 15 | 12 | 7 | 44 | 44 | 0 | 52 | |
| 7 | Montreal Impact | 34 | 12 | 16 | 6 | 45 | 51 | −6 | 42 | |
| 8 | Philadelphia Union | 34 | 10 | 18 | 6 | 37 | 45 | −8 | 36 | |
| 9 | New England Revolution | 34 | 9 | 17 | 8 | 39 | 44 | −5 | 35 | |
| 10 | Toronto FC | 34 | 5 | 21 | 8 | 36 | 62 | −26 | 23 | |

Source: MLS

==== Results summary ====
| Overall | | | | | | | | Home | | | | | | Away | | | | | |
| Pld | W | D | L | GF | GA | GD | Pts | W | D | L | GF | GA | GD | W | D | L | GF | GA | GD |
|---|---|---|---|---|---|---|---|---|---|---|---|---|---|---|---|---|---|---|---|
| 34 | 16 | 9 | 9 | 57 | 46 | +11 | 57 | 11 | 4 | 2 | 34 | 18 | +16 | 5 | 5 | 7 | 23 | 28 | −5 |

Last updated: October 27, 2012.
Source: Competitive Matches

==== Results by round ====
| Round | 1 | 2 | 3 | 4 | 5 | 6 | 7 | 8 | 9 | 10 | 11 | 12 | 13 | 14 | 15 | 16 | 17 | 18 | 19 | 20 | 21 | 22 | 23 | 24 | 25 | 26 | 27 | 28 | 29 | 30 | 31 | 32 | 33 | 34 |
|---|---|---|---|---|---|---|---|---|---|---|---|---|---|---|---|---|---|---|---|---|---|---|---|---|---|---|---|---|---|---|---|---|---|---|
| Stadium | A | A | H | H | A | H | A | H | A | H | A | A | H | A | A | H | A | A | H | H | H | A | A | H | H | A | A | H | H | A | H | H | H | A |
| Result | L | L | W | W | W | D | L | W | W | W | W | W | D | L | D | W | D | L | D | W | W | L | L | W | W | D | D | W | L | D | W | L | D | W |

Updated to match(es) played on October 27, 2012. Source: NewYorkRedBulls.com
A = Away; H = Home; W = Win; D = Draw; L = Loss

==== Matches ====
Kickoff times are in EDT.

| March 11, 2012 Match 1 | Dallas | 2–1 | New York | Frisco, Texas |
| 15:00 | Lloyd 11'; Benítez (yellow card) 38'; Ricardo Villar 61' | Report; Live TV: NBC Sports | McCarty (yellow card) 5'; Tainio (yellow card) 68'; Cooper 78'; Pálsson (yellow card) 88' | Stadium: FC Dallas Stadium; Attendance: 20,906; Referee: Jair Marrufo |

| March 17, 2012 Match 2 | Real Salt Lake | 2–0 | New York | Sandy, Utah |
| 22:00 | Espíndola 39'; Gil (yellow card) 22', (goal) 58' | Report | Richards (yellow card) 14'; Cooper (yellow card) 72'; Holgersson (yellow card) 83' | Stadium: Rio Tinto Stadium; Attendance: 16,738; Referee: Hilario Grajeda |

| March 25, 2012 Match 3 | New York | 4–1 | Colorado | Harrison, New Jersey |
| 16:00 | Henry 3', 53'; Cooper 6', 89'; Solli (yellow card) 31'; Márquez (yellow card) 60' | Report; Live TV: ESPN | Cummings 77' | Stadium: Red Bull Arena; Attendance: 21,024; Referee: Jorge Gonzalez |

| March 31, 2012 Match 4 | New York | 5–2 | Montreal | Harrison, New Jersey |
| 16:00 | Henry 28', 56', 89'; Cooper 45+3' (pen.); Ballouchy 72', (yellow card) 77' | Report | Nyassi 18'; Mapp 38'; Corradi (yellow card) 41' | Stadium: Red Bull Arena; Attendance: 13,415; Referee: Michael Kennedy |

| April 7, 2012 Match 5 | Columbus | 1–4 | New York | Columbus, Ohio |
| 15:00 | Anor (yellow card) 53'; Gruenebaum (yellow card) 83'; Marshall 89' | Report; Live TV: Univision; Deportes | Cooper 3', 13'; Henry 40', 90'; Keel (yellow card) 59' | Stadium: Crew Stadium; Attendance: 11,516; Referee: Mark Kadlecik |

| April 14, 2012 Match 6 | New York | 2–2 | San Jose | Harrison, New Jersey |
| 19:00 | Cooper 5'; McCarty 22'; Richards (yellow card) 47'; Márquez (yellow card) 86' | Report | Baca 15'; Salinas (yellow card) 25'; Wondolowski 35'; Chávez (yellow card) 52' | Stadium: Red Bull Arena; Attendance: 17,114; Referee: Ricardo Salazar |

| April 22, 2012 Match 7 | D.C. United | 4–1 | New York | Washington, D.C. |
| 18:00 | Pontius 8', 32', 69'; DeLeon 36'; Kitchen (yellow card) 71'; Dudar (yellow card) 71' | Report; Live TV: ESPN2 | Henry 72' | Stadium: RFK Memorial Stadium; Attendance: 13,262; Referee: Mark Geiger |

| April 28, 2012 Match 8 | New York | 1–0 | New England | Harrison, New Jersey |
| 15:30 | Henry 7' | Report; Live TV: NBC Sports | Ruthven (yellow card) 18'; Joseph (yellow card) 19' | Stadium: Red Bull Arena; Attendance: 18,152; Referee: Jair Marrufo |

| May 5, 2012 Match 9 | Los Angeles | 0–1 | New York | Carson, California |
| 20:00 | Beckham (yellow card) 32'; Barrett (yellow card) 88' | Report; Live TV: ESPN | Lindpere 19'; Richards (yellow card) 31'; McCarty (yellow card) 80' | Stadium: The Home Depot Center; Attendance: 27,000; Referee: Kevin Stott |

| May 9, 2012 Match 10 | New York | 1–0 | Houston | Harrison, New Jersey |
| 19:00 | Cooper 7', (yellow card) 45'; Lade (yellow card) 56'; McCarty (yellow card) 59' | Report | | Stadium: Red Bull Arena; Attendance: 11,315; Referee: Sorin Stoica |

| May 13, 2012 Match 11 | Philadelphia | 2–3 | New York | Chester, Pennsylvania |
| 12:30 | Adu (yellow card) 5' (yellow-red card) 43'; Pajoy (yellow card) 19', (goal) 31', 46' | Report; Live TV: ESPN2 | Lindpere 17', (yellow card) 54'; Ballouchy (yellow card) 22'; Holgersson 68'; Cooper 78' | Stadium: PPL Park; Attendance: 18,193; Referee: Jorge Gonzalez |

| May 19, 2012 Match 12 | Montreal | 1–2 | New York | Montreal, Quebec |
| 19:30 | Corradi 22' (pen.); Brovsky (yellow card) 71' | Report | Pálsson (yellow card) 4' (yellow-red card) 58'; Cooper 37' (pen.); McCarty (yellow card) 65'; Richards 67' | Stadium: Olympic Stadium; Attendance: 20,373; Referee: Ismail Elfath |

| May 23, 2012 Match 13 | New York | 1–1 | Chivas USA | Harrison, New Jersey |
| 19:00 | Cooper 56'; Lindpere (yellow card) 73' | Report; Live TV: Univision; Deportes | Ángel 47' | Stadium: Red Bull Arena; Attendance: 13,919; Referee: Armando Villarreal |

| June 17, 2012 Match 14 | Chicago | 3–1 | New York | Bridgeview, Illinois |
| 17:00 | Nyarko 4'; Gargan (yellow card) 37'; Segares 68', (yellow card) 79'; Rolfe 81'; Oduro (yellow card) 65' | Report; Live TV: Univision; Deportes | McCarty 55'; Richards (yellow card) 80' | Stadium: Toyota Park; Attendance: 18,526; Referee: Baldomero Toledo |

| June 20, 2012 Match 15 | Vancouver | 1–1 | New York | Vancouver, B.C. |
| 23:00 | Hassli (yellow card) 67'; Bonjour 75' | Report | Richards (yellow card) 14'; Lindpere (yellow card) 19'; Pearce 86' | Stadium: BC Place; Attendance: 20,060; Referee: Chris Penso |

| June 24, 2012 Match 16 | New York | 3–2 | D.C. United | Harrison, New Jersey |
| 19:00 | Barklage 20', 45+2'; McCarty (yellow card) 38'; Solli 55', (yellow card) 90+3'; Ballouchy (yellow card) 90' | Report; Live TV: NBC Sports | Pontius 1', 66' | Stadium: Red Bull Arena; Attendance: 25,187; Referee: Mark Geiger |

| June 30, 2012 Match 17 | Toronto | 1–1 | New York | Toronto, Ontario |
| 19:00 | Koevermans 6'; Dunfield (yellow card) 32' | Report; Live TV: Galavisión | Solli 4'; Richards (yellow card) 47' | Stadium: BMO Field; Attendance: 20,071; Referee: Ricardo Salazar |

| July 8, 2012 Match 18 | New England | 2–0 | New York | Foxborough, Massachusetts |
| 19:00 | Nguyen 24'; Bengtson 84' | Report | Richards (yellow card) 9'; Miller (yellow card) 48'; Lindpere (yellow card) 67' | Stadium: Gillette Stadium; Attendance: 14,373; Referee: Drew Fischer |

| July 15, 2012 Match 19 | New York | 2–2 | Seattle | Harrison, New Jersey |
| 16:10 | Le Toux 24'; Lade (yellow card) 53'; Lindpere 61'; Henry (yellow card) 74' | Report | Fernández 15'; Burch (yellow card) 44'; Rose (yellow card) 66'; Montero 67' | Stadium: Red Bull Arena; Attendance: 19,414; Referee: Jorge Gonzalez |

| July 18, 2012 Match 20 | New York | 1–0 | Chicago | Harrison, New Jersey |
| 13:00 | Barklage (yellow card) 60'; Henry 71' | Report | Pappa (yellow card) 20'; Nyarko (yellow card) 90+1' | Stadium: Red Bull Arena; Attendance: 15,814; Referee: Edvin Jurisevic |

| July 21, 2012 Match 21 | New York | 2–0 | Philadelphia | Harrison, New Jersey |
| 14:30 | Cooper 43', 58', (yellow card) 62' | Report | Pajoy (yellow card) 49'; Farfan (yellow card) 54'; Hoppenot (yellow card) 90+3' | Stadium: Red Bull Arena; Attendance: 21,842; Referee: Hilario Grajeda |

| July 28, 2012 Match 22 | Montreal | 3–1 | New York | Montreal, Quebec |
| 19:30 | Bernier (yellow card) 27'; Di Vaio 48', (yellow card) 71'; Arnaud 50'; Nyassi 74' | Report | Henry 57', (yellow card) 73'; Miller (yellow card) 71'; McCarty (yellow card) 83' | Stadium: Saputo Stadium; Attendance: 19,441; Referee: Abiodun Okulaja |

| August 3, 2012 Match 23 | Houston | 2–0 | New York | Houston, Texas |
| 20:00 | Taylor 2'; Carr 28' | Report | Pearce (yellow card) 46'; Pálsson (yellow card) 90' | Stadium: BBVA Compass Stadium; Attendance: 22,039; Referee: Silviu Petrescu |

| August 10, 2012 Match 24 | New York | 2–0 | Houston | Harrison, New Jersey |
| 20:00 | Lindpere (yellow card) 58'; Holgersson 61'; Lade (yellow card) 67'; Solli 90+2' | Report | Kandji (yellow card) 28' | Stadium: Red Bull Arena; Attendance: 15,730; Referee: Chris Penso |

| August 19, 2012 Match 25 | New York | 3–2 | Portland | Harrison, New Jersey |
| 19:00 | Cooper 42'; Cahill 45'; Pearce 83' | Report | Dike 8'; Nagbe 32'; Chara (yellow card) 93' | Stadium: Red Bull Arena; Attendance: 19,043; Referee: Jason Anno |

| August 26, 2012 Match 26 | Kansas City | 1–1 | New York | Kansas City, Kansas |
| 21:00 | Kamara 4'; Collin (yellow card) 36'; Espinoza (yellow card) 68'; Sapong (yellow card) 76' | Report | Kamara 28' (o.g.); Cahill (yellow card) 45'; Conde (yellow card) 78' | Stadium: Livestrong Sporting Park; Attendance: 18,491; Referee: Hilario Grajeda |

| August 29, 2012 Match 27 | D.C. United | 2–2 | New York | Washington, D.C. |
| 20:00 | DeLeon 21'; De Rosario 68', (yellow card) 72' | Report | Lindpere 19'; Conde 88' | Stadium: RFK Memorial Stadium; Attendance: 10,303; Referee: Ricardo Salazar |

| September 15, 2012 Match 28 | New York | 3–1 | Columbus | Harrison, New Jersey |
| 19:00 | Henry 9', 90+3'; Cahill (yellow card) 56'; McCarty 79' | Report | Mirošević 3'; James (yellow card) 50' | Stadium: Red Bull Arena; Attendance: 17,134; Referee: Abiodun Okulaja |

| September 19, 2012 Match 29 | New York | 0–2 | Kansas City | Harrison, New Jersey |
| 19:00 | | Report | Sapong 12'; Kamara 19'; Espinoza (yellow card) 37' | Stadium: Red Bull Arena; Attendance: 10,286; Referee: David Gantar |

| September 22, 2012 Match 30 | New England | 1–1 | New York | Foxborough, Massachusetts |
| 19:30 | Rowe (yellow card) 57'; Barnes (yellow card) 63', (goal) 90+5' | Report | Lade (yellow card) 54' (yellow-red card) 74'; Tainio (yellow card) 62'; Conde (yellow card) 68'; Gaudette (yellow card) 88'; Lindpere 90+1' | Stadium: Gillette Stadium; Attendance: 24,364; Referee: Sorin Stoica |

| September 29, 2012 Match 31 | New York | 4–1 | Toronto | Harrison, New Jersey |
| 19:00 | Holgersson 13'; Cooper 27', 88'; Henry 90+3' | Report | Johnson 6'; Maund (yellow card) 69' | Stadium: Red Bull Arena; Attendance: 25,017; Referee: Fotis Bazakos |

| October 6, 2012 Match 32 | New York | 0–2 | Chicago | Harrison, New Jersey |
| 15:30 | Conde (yellow card) 14'; Henry (yellow card) 43' | Report | Paladini (yellow card) 28'; MacDonald 65', 78' | Stadium: Red Bull Arena; Attendance: 21,157; Referee: Ricardo Salazar |

| October 20, 2012 Match 33 | New York | 0–0 | Kansas City | Harrison, New Jersey |
| 19:00 | Holgersson (yellow card) 38'; Henry (yellow card) 44'; Sam (yellow card) 70' | Report | Kamara (yellow card) 54' | Stadium: Red Bull Arena; Attendance: 25,219; Referee: Silviu Petrescu |

| October 27, 2012 Match 34 | Philadelphia | 0–3 | New York | Chester, Pennsylvania |
| 13:30 | | Report; Live TV: NBC Sports | Cooper 13' (pen.), 66'; Henry 35', (yellow card) 90+3'; Márquez (yellow card) 61' | Stadium: PPL Park; Attendance: 18,533; Referee: Chris Penso |

=== MLS Cup Playoffs ===
Kickoff times are in EDT.

| November 3, 2012 First Leg | D.C. United | 1–1 | New York | Washington, D.C. |
| 20:00 | Miller 61' (o.g.); Najar (yellow card) 71' (yellow-red card) 71' | Report | Lade (yellow card) 23'; Hamid 65' (o.g.); Pearce (yellow card) 75' | Stadium: RFK Memorial Stadium; Attendance: 17,556; Referee: Jair Marrufo |
Note: Order of legs reversed from original schedule due to Hurricane Sandy.

| November 8, 2012 Second Leg | New York | 0–1 (1–2 agg.) | D.C. United | Harrison, New Jersey |
| 19:30 | Márquez (yellow card) 61' (yellow-red card) 75'; Cooper (penalty missed) 74' | | Hamid (red card) 69'; Pajoy (yellow card) 71'; DeLeon 88' | Stadium: Red Bull Arena; Attendance: 14,035; Referee: Mark Geiger |
Note: Game originally schedule for November 7, 2012, but changed due to a Nor'easter.

=== U.S. Open Cup ===
Kickoff times are in EDT.

| May 29, 2012 Third Round | Charleston | 0–3 | New York | Charleston, South Carolina |
| 19:30 | Sanyang (yellow card) 65' | Report | Cooper 14'; Pearce 41'; Lade 70' | Stadium: Blackbaud Stadium; Attendance: 3,527; Referee: Daniel Fitzgerald |

| June 5, 2012 Fourth Round | Harrisburg | 3–1 (a.e.t.) | New York | Harrisburg, Pennsylvania |
| 19:05 | Touray 13', 94'; Duckett (yellow card) 28'; Welker (yellow card) 38'; Pelletier (yellow card) 87'; Basso (yellow card) 90+2'; Noble (yellow card) 115'; Mkosana 117' | Report | Lade 58'; Arteaga (yellow card) 90+2'; Holgersson (yellow card) 120' | Stadium: Skyline Sports Complex; Attendance: 1,477; Referee: Robert Sibiga |

== Miscellany ==
=== Allocation ranking ===
New York is in the #11 position in the MLS Allocation Ranking. The allocation ranking is the mechanism used to determine which MLS club has first priority to acquire a U.S. National Team player who signs with MLS after playing abroad, or a former MLS player who returns to the league after having gone to a club abroad for a transfer fee. A ranking can be traded, provided that part of the compensation received in return is another club's ranking.

=== International roster spots ===
It is believed that New York has 11 MLS International Roster Slots for use in the 2012 season. It is believed the three extra slots that New York possesses were acquired from the Houston Dynamo franchise (then based in San Jose) in January 2005 in exchange for Ricardo Clark, again from Houston in March 2009, and from Colorado Rapids in the September 2010 Macoumba Kandji trade. The trade of this spot was not included in the press release.

=== Future draft pick trades ===
Future picks acquired: *2013 MLS SuperDraft conditional draft pick from San Jose Earthquakes; *Unspecified year conditional draft pick from Toronto FC.
Future picks traded: *2013 MLS SuperDraft Round 1 to Portland Timbers; *2013 MLS SuperDraft Round 2 to Sporting Kansas City; *2014 MLS Supplemental Draft Round 2 pick to Los Angeles Galaxy.
