= 2013 New York Red Bulls season =

New York Red Bulls
2013 season
- General manager: Jérôme de Bontin
- Head coach: Mike Petke
- Stadium: Red Bull Arena
- MLS: Overall, 1st Eastern, 1st
- MLS Cup: Conference Semi-Finals
- U.S. Open Cup: Fourth Round
- Top goalscorer: League: Cahill (11 goals); All: Cahill (12 goals)
- Highest home attendance: 25,483 vs Houston Dynamo (June 30)
- Lowest home attendance: 3,867 vs Reading United (May 29)
- Average home league attendance: 18,594

The 2013 New York Red Bulls season was the club's eighteenth season in Major League Soccer, the top division of American soccer.

== Team uniform ==
Home	Home Alternate	Away	Away Alternate

== Squad ==
As of August 30, 2013.

No.	Name	Nationality	Position	Date of birth (age)	Previous club
Goalkeepers
1	Kevin Hartman	(United States)	GK	May 25, 1974 (age 51)	(United States) FC Dallas
18	Ryan Meara	(United States)	GK	November 15, 1990 (age 35)	(United States) Fordham University
24	Santiago Castaño	(United States)	GK	April 14, 1995 (age 31)	Academy
31	Luis Robles	(United States)	GK	May 11, 1984 (age 41)	(Germany) Karlsruher SC
Defenders
3	Heath Pearce	(United States)	LB	August 13, 1984 (age 41)	(United States) Chivas USA
4	Jámison Olave	(Colombia)	CB	April 21, 1981 (age 45)	(United States) Real Salt Lake
5	Markus Holgersson	(Sweden)	CB	April 16, 1985 (age 41)	(Sweden) Helsingborg
7	Roy Miller	(Costa Rica)	LB	November 24, 1984 (age 41)	(Norway) Rosenborg
16	Connor Lade	(United States)	RB	November 16, 1989 (age 36)	(United States) St. John's University
20	Matt Miazga	(United States)	RB	July 19, 1995 (age 30)	Academy
25	Brandon Barklage	(United States)	RB	November 2, 1986 (age 39)	(United States) D.C. United
27	Kosuke Kimura	(Japan)	RB	May 14, 1984 (age 41)	(United States) Portland Timbers
32	Ibrahim Sekagya	(Uganda)	CB	December 19, 1980 (age 45)	(Austria) Red Bull Salzburg
Midfielders
2	Ian Christianson	(United States)	MF	March 6, 1991 (age 35)	(United States) Georgetown University
8	David Carney	(Australia)	MF	November 30, 1983 (age 42)	(Uzbekistan) Bunyodkor PFK
10	Lloyd Sam	(England)	MF	September 27, 1984 (age 41)	(England) Leeds United
11	Dax McCarty	(United States)	CM	April 30, 1987 (age 39)	(United States) D.C. United
12	Eric Alexander	(United States)	RM	April 14, 1988 (age 38)	(United States) Portland Timbers
13	Marius Obekop	(Cameroon)	MF	December 19, 1994 (age 31)	(Cameroon) Renaissance
17	Tim Cahill	(Australia)	CAM	December 6, 1979 (age 46)	(England) Everton
21	Ruben Bover	(Spain)	MF	June 24, 1992 (age 33)	(England) Charlton Athletic
22	Jonny Steele	(Northern Ireland)	LM	February 7, 1986 (age 40)	(United States) Real Salt Lake
23	Michael Bustamante	(Colombia)	MF	September 21, 1989 (age 36)	(United States) Boston University
Forwards
9	Fabián Espíndola	(Argentina)	ST	May 4, 1985 (age 41)	(United States) Real Salt Lake
14	Thierry Henry	(France)	ST	August 17, 1977 (age 48)	(Spain) Barcelona
15	Andre Akpan	(United States)	RW	December 9, 1987 (age 38)	(United States) Colorado Rapids
19	Amando Moreno	(United States)	ST	September 10, 1995 (age 30)	Academy
88	Péguy Luyindula	(France)	ST	May 25, 1979 (age 46)	(France) Paris Saint-Germain
99	Bradley Wright-Phillips	(England)	FW	March 12, 1985 (age 41)	(England) Charlton Athletic

== Player management ==
=== Transfers ===
==== In ====
#	Position	Player	Acquired From	Fee/notes	Date	Source
9	FW	(Argentina) Fabián Espíndola	(United States) Real Salt Lake	Acquired with Jámison Olave for undisclosed allocation money	December 3, 2012	
4	DF	(Colombia) Jámison Olave	(United States) Real Salt Lake	Acquired with Fabián Espíndola for undisclosed allocation money	December 3, 2012	
27	DF	(Japan) Kosuke Kimura	(United States) Portland Timbers	Acquired for undisclosed allocation money, and the rights to academy player Bryan Gallego	December 3, 2012	
29	FW	(Costa Rica) Josué Martínez	(United States) Philadelphia Union	Acquired with undisclosed allocation money for Sébastien Le Toux	December 6, 2012	
24	GK	(United States) Santiago Castaño	Academy Product	Signed as a Home Grown Player along with Amando Moreno	December 11, 2012	
19	FW	(United States) Amando Moreno	Academy Product	Signed as a Home Grown Player along with Santiago Castaño	December 11, 2012	
8	MF	(Brazil) Juninho	(Brazil) Vasco da Gama	Signed on free transfer	December 17, 2012	
12	MF	(Spain) Ruben Bover	(England) Charlton Athletic	Signed on free transfer after trialing during preseason	February 8, 2013	
21	MF	(United States) Eric Alexander	(United States) Portland Timbers	Acquired for undisclosed allocation money	February 11, 2013	
22	MF	(Northern Ireland) Jonny Steele	(United States) Real Salt Lake	Acquired in exchange for conditional supplemental draft pick	February 20, 2013	
20	MF	(United States) Michael Bustamante	(United States) Boston University	Drafted as 13th pick in the 1st round of the 2013 MLS Supplemental Draft; subsequently signed	February 22, 2013	
2	MF	(United States) Ian Christianson	(United States) Georgetown University	Drafted as 22nd pick in the 2nd round of the 2013 MLS SuperDraft; subsequently signed	February 22, 2013	
92	FW	(Austria) Rafhinha	(Brazil) Toledo Colônia Work	Signed on a free transfer after trialing during preseason	March 18, 2013	
13	MF	(Cameroon) Marius Obekop	(Cameroon) Renaissance FC	Signed on a free transfer after trialing during preseason	March 18, 2013	
88	FW	(France) Péguy Luyindula	(France) Paris Saint-Germain	Signed on a free transfer after trialing during preseason	March 19, 2013	
1	GK	(United States) Kevin Hartman	(United States) FC Dallas	Signed on free transfer	March 22, 2013	
15	FW	(United States) Andre Akpan	(United States) Colorado Rapids	Acquired in exchange for conditional draft pick	March 28, 2013	
20	DF	(United States) Matt Miazga	Academy Product	Signed as Home Grown Player	May 30, 2013	
32	DF	(Uganda) Ibrahim Sekagya	(Austria) Red Bull Salzburg	Signed on free transfer after trialing during the season	July 11, 2013	
99	FW	(England) Bradley Wright-Phillips	(England) Charlton Athletic	Signed on free transfer	July 24, 2013	
8	MF	(Australia) David Carney	(Uzbekistan) Bunyodkor PFK	Signed on free transfer	August 8, 2013	

==== Out ====
#	Position:	Player	Transferred to	Fee	Date	Source
99	FW	(Colombia) José Angulo	(United States) Pittsburgh Riverhounds	Option Declined	November 19, 2012	
27	FW	(Colombia) Jhonny Arteaga	(United States) Pittsburgh Riverhounds	Option Declined	November 19, 2012	
21	FW	(United States) Corey Hertzog	(Canada) Vancouver Whitecaps FC	Option Declined	November 19, 2012	
8	MF	(Norway) Jan Gunnar Solli	(Norway) Vålerenga	Option Declined	November 19, 2012	
6	MF	(Finland) Teemu Tainio	(Finland) HJK Helsinki	Option Declined	November 19, 2012	
12	DF	(United States) Jonathan Borrajo	(Norway) Mjøndalen IF	Option Declined	November 19, 2012	
22	DF	(United States) Stephen Keel	(United States) FC Dallas	Option Declined	November 19, 2012	
15	DF	(United States) Tyler Ruthven	(Sweden) IK Brage	Option Declined	November 19, 2012	
88	GK	(Puerto Rico) Bill Gaudette	Free Agent	Option Declined	November 19, 2012	
24	GK	(United States) Jeremy Vuolo	(United States) San Antonio Scorpions	Option Declined	November 19, 2012	
9	FW	(France) Sébastien Le Toux	(United States) Philadelphia Union	Traded for Josué Martínez and undisclosed allocation money	December 6, 2012	
4	DF	(Mexico) Rafael Márquez	(Mexico) Club León	Released	December 12, 2012	
44	MF	(Iceland) Victor Pálsson	(Netherlands) NEC Nijmegen	Contract termination	January 3, 2013	
20	MF	(Estonia) Joel Lindpere	(United States) Chicago Fire	Traded for an International Roster Slot	January 4, 2013	
2	DF	(Colombia) Wilman Conde	Free Agent	Contract termination	January 23, 2013	
33	FW	(United States) Kenny Cooper	(United States) FC Dallas	Traded for undisclosed allocation money	February 4, 2013	
29	FW	(Costa Rica) Josué Martínez	(Costa Rica) Deportivo Saprissa	Waived	March 29, 2013	
92	MF	(Austria) Rafinha	(Brazil) Grêmio Barueri	Waived	June 27, 2013	
8	MF	(Brazil) Juninho	(Brazil) Vasco da Gama	Contract Terminated	July 3, 2013	
6	DF	(Brazil) Digão	Retired	Contract Terminated	July 19, 2013	

== Statistics ==
=== Appearances and goals ===
As of December 3, 2013

No.	Pos	Nat	Player	Total		MLS		MLS Cup		U.S. Open Cup	
No.	Pos	Nat	Player	Apps	Goals	Apps	Goals	Apps	Goals	Apps	Goals
1	GK	(United States) USA	Kevin Hartman	0	0	0+0	0	0+0	0	0+0	0
2	MF	(United States) USA	Ian Christanson	0	0	0+0	0	0+0	0	0+0	0
3	DF	(United States) USA	Heath Pearce	16	0	11+3	0	0+0	0	2+0	0
4	DF	(Colombia) COL	Jámison Olave	30	4	27+2	4	1+0	0	0+0	0
5	DF	(Sweden) SWE	Markus Holgersson	36	0	32+0	0	2+0	0	2+0	0
7	DF	(Costa Rica) CRC	Roy Miller	18	0	16+1	0	0+0	0	1+0	0
8	MF	(Australia) AUS	David Carney	9	0	7+0	0	2+0	0	0+0	0
9	FW	(Argentina) ARG	Fabián Espíndola	31	11	23+5	9	0+1	0	1+1	2
10	MF	(England) ENG	Lloyd Sam	26	6	8+14	5	1+1	0	2+0	1
11	MF	(United States) USA	Dax McCarty	34	4	29+1	4	2+0	0	1+1	0
12	MF	(United States) USA	Eric Alexander	38	5	30+4	4	1+1	1	1+1	0
13	MF	(Cameroon) CMR	Marius Obekop	5	0	0+5	0	0+0	0	0+0	0
14	FW	(France) FRA	Thierry Henry	32	10	27+3	10	2+0	0	0+0	0
15	FW	(United States) USA	Andre Akpan	8	0	1+6	0	0+0	0	0+1	0
16	DF	(United States) USA	Connor Lade	6	0	2+3	0	0+0	0	1+0	0
17	MF	(Australia) AUS	Tim Cahill	29	12	27+0	11	2+0	1	0+0	0
18	GK	(United States) USA	Ryan Meara	2	0	0+0	0	0+0	0	2+0	0
19	FW	(United States) USA	Amando Moreno	3	0	0+2	0	0+0	0	1+0	0
20	DF	(United States) USA	Matt Miazga	1	0	0+1	0	0+0	0	0+0	0
21	MF	(Spain) ESP	Ruben Bover	7	0	1+6	0	0+0	0	0+0	0
22	MF	(Northern Ireland) NIR	Jonny Steele	36	6	32+1	5	2+0	0	1+0	1
23	MF	(Colombia) COL	Michael Bustamante	5	0	1+3	0	0+0	0	1+0	0
24	GK	(United States) USA	Santiago Castaño	0	0	0+0	0	0+0	0	0+0	0
25	DF	(United States) USA	Brandon Barklage	30	0	20+6	0	1+1	0	2+0	0
27	DF	(Japan) JPN	Kosuke Kimura	25	0	15+9	0	0+0	0	1+0	0
31	GK	(United States) USA	Luis Robles	36	0	34+0	0	2+0	0	0+0	0
32	DF	(Uganda) UGA	Ibrahim Sekagya	10	2	8+0	2	2+0	0	0+0	0
88	FW	(France) FRA	Péguy Luyindula	26	1	9+13	1	1+1	0	1+1	0
99	FW	(England) ENG	Bradley Wright-Phillips	9	2	4+3	1	1+1	1	0+0	0
	DF	(Brazil) BRA	Digão [L]	0	0	0+0	0	0+0	0	0+0	0
	MF	(Brazil) BRA	Juninho [L]	15	0	10+3	0	0+0	0	2+0	0
	MF	(Austria) AUT	Rafhinha [L]	0	0	0+0	0	0+0	0	0+0	0
	FW	(Costa Rica) CRC	Josué Martínez [L]	1	0	0+1	0	0+0	0	0+0	0

- [L] = Left team during the season.

=== Top scorers ===
Place	Position	Number	Name	MLS	MLS Cup	U.S. Open Cup	Total
1	MF	17	(Australia) Tim Cahill	11	1	0	12
2	FW	9	(Argentina) Fabián Espíndola	9	0	2	11
3	FW	14	(France) Thierry Henry	10	0	0	10
4	MF	10	(England) Lloyd Sam	5	0	1	6
4	MF	22	(Northern Ireland) Jonny Steele	5	0	1	6
6	MF	12	(United States) Eric Alexander	4	1	0	5
7	DF	4	(Colombia) Jámison Olave	4	0	0	4
7	MF	11	(United States) Dax McCarty	4	0	0	4
9	DF	32	(Uganda) Ibrahim Sekagya	2	0	0	2
10	FW	88	(France) Péguy Luyindula	1	0	0	1
10	FW	99	(England) Bradley Wright-Phillips	1	0	0	1
TOTALS				56	2	4	62

=== Starting 11 ===
No.	Pos.	Nat.	Name	MS	Notes
31	GK	(United States)	Robles	34	
25	RB	(United States)	Barklage	20	
4	CB	(Colombia)	Olave	27	
5	CB	(Sweden)	Holgersson	32	
7	LB	(Costa Rica)	Miller	16	
11	DM	(United States)	McCarty	29	
17	CM	(Australia)	Cahill	27	
12	RM	(United States)	Alexander	30	
22	LM	(Northern Ireland)	Steele	32	
9	FW	(Argentina)	Espíndola	23	
14	FW	(France)	Henry	27	

Last updated: October 27, 2013
Source: Squad stats and Start formations.
Only competitive matches.
Using the most used start formation.
Ordered by position on pitch (from back right to front left).

== Competitions ==
=== Pre-season ===
Kickoff times are in EDT

February 1, 2013 Preseason	New York	2–0	Columbus	Bradenton, Florida
6:45 AM	Cahill (yellow card) 24'; Izquierdo (yellow card) 45'; Christianson 80'; Cooper 87'	Report	George (yellow card) 32'	Stadium: IMG Academy

February 7, 2013 Preseason	New York	3–2	Malmö FF	Bradenton, Florida
10:05 AM	Henry 27'; Moreno 86'; Domingues 88'	Report	Friberg 3'; Ferreira (yellow card) 28'; Rexhepi 53'	Stadium: IMG Academy

=== Desert Diamond Cup ===
==== Standings ====
Pos	Team	Pld	W	L	D	GF	GA	GD	Pts
1	Seattle Sounders FC	3	3	0	0	6	1	+5	9
2	Real Salt Lake	3	1	1	1	6	6	0	4
3	New England Revolution	3	1	2	0	5	6	−1	3
4	New York Red Bulls	3	0	2	1	3	7	−4	1

==== Matches ====
Kickoff times are in EDT

February 13, 2013 Group 1	Real Salt Lake	2–2	New York	Tucson, Arizona
6:00 PM	Plata 1'; Grossman 3'	Report	Olave 30'; Bustamante 61'	Stadium: Kino Stadium

February 16, 2013 Group 2	New England	3–1	New York	Tucson, Arizona
8:00 PM	Nguyen 53'; Bengtson 58'; Jesic 88'; Caldwell (yellow card) 84'	Report	Juninho 11'; Robles (yellow card) 65'	Stadium: Kino Stadium

February 20, 2013 Group 3	Seattle	2–0	New York	Tucson, Arizona
16:00 PM	Caskey 36'; Martinez 78'; Zavaleta (yellow card) 4'	Report		Stadium: Kino Stadium

February 23, 2013 3rd Place	New England	2–0	New York	Tucson, Arizona
7:00 PM	Nguyen 4' (pen.); Bengtson 36'; Toja (yellow card) 45'	Report	Espindola (yellow card) 17'; Miller (yellow card) 45'; Cahill (yellow card) 65'	Stadium: Kino Stadium

=== Major League Soccer ===
==== League table ====
Pos	Team	Pld	W	L	T	GF	GA	GD	Pts	Qualification
1	New York Red Bulls (S)	34	17	9	8	58	41	+17	59	CONCACAF Champions League
2	Sporting Kansas City (C)	34	17	10	7	47	30	+17	58	CONCACAF Champions League
3	Portland Timbers	34	14	5	15	54	33	+21	57	CONCACAF Champions League
4	Real Salt Lake	34	16	10	8	57	41	+16	56	
5	LA Galaxy	34	15	11	8	53	38	+15	53	
6	Seattle Sounders FC	34	15	12	7	42	42	0	52	
7	New England Revolution	34	14	11	9	49	38	+11	51	
8	Colorado Rapids	34	14	11	9	45	38	+7	51	
9	Houston Dynamo	34	14	11	9	41	41	0	51	
10	San Jose Earthquakes	34	14	11	9	35	42	−7	51	
11	Montreal Impact	34	14	13	7	50	49	+1	49	CONCACAF Champions League
12	Chicago Fire	34	14	13	7	47	52	−5	49	
13	Vancouver Whitecaps FC	34	13	12	9	53	45	+8	48	
14	Philadelphia Union	34	12	12	10	42	44	−2	46	
15	FC Dallas	34	11	12	11	48	52	−4	44	
16	Columbus Crew	34	12	17	5	42	46	−4	41	
17	Toronto FC	34	6	17	11	30	47	−17	29	
18	Chivas USA	34	6	20	8	30	67	−37	26	
19	D.C. United	34	3	24	7	22	59	−37	16	CONCACAF Champions League

Source: MLS
Rules for classification: 1) points; 2) head-to-head record; 3) goal difference; 4) number of goals scored
(C) MLS Cup Champion; (S) Supporters' Shield

==== Eastern Conference standings ====
Pos	Team	Pld	W	L	T	GF	GA	GD	Pts	Qualification
1	New York Red Bulls	34	17	9	8	58	41	+17	59	MLS Cup Conference Semifinals
2	Sporting Kansas City	34	17	10	7	47	30	+17	58	MLS Cup Conference Semifinals
3	New England Revolution	34	14	11	9	49	38	+11	51	MLS Cup Conference Semifinals
4	Houston Dynamo	34	14	11	9	41	41	0	51	MLS Cup Knockout Round
5	Montreal Impact	34	14	13	7	50	49	+1	49	MLS Cup Knockout Round
6	Chicago Fire	34	14	13	7	47	52	−5	49	
7	Philadelphia Union	34	12	12	10	42	44	−2	46	
8	Columbus Crew	34	12	17	5	42	46	−4	41	
9	Toronto FC	34	6	17	11	30	47	−17	29	
10	D.C. United	34	3	24	7	22	59	−37	16	

Source: MLS

==== Results summary ====
Overall								Home						Away					
Pld	Pts	W	L	T	GF	GA	GD	W	L	T	GF	GA	GD	W	L	T	GF	GA	GD
34	59	17	9	8	58	41	+17	11	2	4	34	16	+18	6	7	4	24	25	−1

Last updated: October 27, 2013
Source: Match Results
Pld = Matches played; Pts = Points; W = Matches won; T = Matches tied; L = Matches lost; GF = Goals for; GA = Goals against; GD = Goal difference

==== Results by round ====
Round	1	2	3	4	5	6	7	8	9	10	11	12	13	14	15	16	17	18	19	20	21	22	23	24	25	26	27	28	29	30	31	32	33	34
Stadium	A	A	H	A	H	A	A	H	H	A	A	H	A	H	H	H	A	H	A	H	A	H	A	A	H	A	H	A	H	H	A	H	A	H
Result	D	L	D	L	W	L	W	L	W	W	W	W	D	W	D	L	L	W	L	W	D	W	W	L	D	L	W	W	W	W	D	D	W	W

Updated to match(es) played on October 27, 2013. Source: NewYorkRedBulls.com
A = Away; H = Home; W = Win; D = Draw; L = Loss

==== Match results ====
Kickoff times are in EDT

March 3, 2013 Match 1	Portland	3–3	New York	Portland, Oregon
7:30 PM	Valeri 14'; Nagbe 56'; Olave 83' (o.g.)	Report; Live TV: ESPN2	Espíndola 9', 24'; Olave 28'	Stadium: JELD-WEN Field; Attendance: 20,674; Referee: Jair Marrufo

March 10, 2013 Match 2	San Jose	2–1	New York	Santa Clara, California
10:00 PM	Wondolowski (yellow card) 41', (goal) 90+3' (pen.); Jahn 83'	Report; Live TV: ESPN2	Alexander 17', (yellow card) 61'	Stadium: Buck Shaw Stadium; Attendance: 10,525; Referee: Ricardo Salazar

March 16, 2013 Match 3	New York	0–0	D.C. United	Harrison, New Jersey
12:30 PM	Cahill (yellow card) 25'; Espíndola (yellow card) 64'; Juninho (yellow card) 78'	Report; Live TV: NBC		Stadium: Red Bull Arena; Attendance: 20,022; Referee: Mark Geiger

March 23, 2013 Match 4	Montreal	1–0	New York	Montreal, Canada
4:30 PM	di Vaio 14'; Camara (yellow card) 85'	Report	Juninho (yellow card) 18'; Steele (yellow card) 42'; Barklage (yellow card) 66' (yellow-red card) 74'; Alexander (yellow card) 81'	Stadium: Stade Saputo; Attendance: 26,259; Referee: Chris Penso

March 30, 2013 Match 5	New York	2–1	Philadelphia	Harrison, New Jersey
3:30 PM	McCarty 55'; Henry 81'	Report; Live TV: NBC Sports	Casey 63', (yellow card) 90+2'	Stadium: Red Bull Arena; Attendance: 15,824; Referee: Silviu Petrescu

April 7, 2013 Match 6	Chicago Fire	3–1	New York	Bridgeview, Illinois
5:00 PM	Berry (yellow card) 16'; Paladini 44'; Santos 83', 89'	Report; Live TV: ESPN2	Olave 17'; Holgersson (yellow card) 51'; Luyindula (yellow card) 66'	Stadium: Toyota Park; Attendance: 12,557; Referee: Allen Chapman

April 13, 2013 Match 7	D.C. United	0–2	New York	Washington, D.C.
7:00 PM		Report	Henry 29'; Olave 36'	Stadium: RFK Stadium; Attendance: 18,019; Referee: Jair Marrufo

April 17, 2013 Match 8	New York	0–1	Sporting Kansas City	Harrison, New Jersey
7:30 PM	Cahill (yellow card) 45+1'; McCarty (yellow card) 81'; Juninho (red card) 90+1'	Report	Collin 13'; Myers (yellow card) 27'; Rosell (yellow card) 69'; Joseph (yellow card) 87'; Nielsen (yellow card) 90+6'	Stadium: Red Bull Arena; Attendance: 12,338; Referee: Allen Chapman

April 20, 2013 Match 9	New York	4–1	New England	Harrison, New Jersey
7:00 PM	McCarthy 4'; Espíndola 8'; Robles (yellow card) 78'; Henry 82'; Steele 89'	Report	Barklage 6' (o.g.); Cisse (yellow card) 35'	Stadium: Red Bull Arena; Attendance: 18,029; Referee: Fotis Bazakos

April 27, 2013 Match 10	Toronto	1–2	New York	Toronto, Canada
2:00 PM	Osorio 83'	Report	Cahill 39', 89'	Stadium: BMO Field; Attendance: 20,009; Referee: Jorge González

May 4, 2013 Match 11	Columbus	0–1	New York	Columbus
4:00 PM		Report	Miller (yellow card) 61'; Juninho (yellow card) 73'; Cahill 80', (yellow card) 81'	Stadium: Columbus Crew Stadium; Attendance: 12,020; Referee: Armando Villarreal

May 8, 2013 Match 12	New York	2–1	Montreal	Harrison, New Jersey
7:30 PM	Henry 47', 88'	Report	Di Vaio 90+2'	Stadium: Red Bull Arena; Attendance: 11,892; Referee: Hilario Grajeda

May 11, 2013 Match 13	New England	1–1	New York	Foxborough, Massachusetts
7:30 PM	Cissé (yellow card) 19'; Fagundez 54'	Report	Sam 55'	Stadium: Gillette Stadium; Attendance: 16,440; Referee: Ricardo Salazar

May 19, 2013 Match 14	New York	1–0	Los Angeles	Harrison, New Jersey
1:00 PM	Henry (yellow card) 87'; Cahill 90+1'	Report; Live TV: ESPN2	DeLaGarza (yellow card) 34'	Stadium: Red Bull Arena; Attendance: 25,219; Referee: Silviu Petrescu

May 26, 2013 Match 15	New York	2–2	Columbus	Harrison, New Jersey
5:00 PM	Henry 31'; Juninho (yellow card) 66'; Olave 91'	Report	Oduro 2'; Sánchez (yellow card) 41'; Higuaín 74'; George (yellow card) 76'	Stadium: Red Bull Arena; Attendance: 14,840; Referee: Geoff Gamble

June 1, 2013 Match 16	New York	1–2	Vancouver	Harrison, New Jersey
7:00 PM	Olave (yellow card) 49' (yellow-red card) 75'; Klazura 51' (o.g.); Miller (yellow card) 86'	Report	Harvey 58', (yellow card) 67'; Rochat (yellow card) 70'; Miller 83'	Stadium: Red Bull Arena; Attendance: 19,969; Referee: Jorge González

June 23, 2013 Match 17	Philadelphia	3–0	New York	Chester, Pennsylvania
5:00 PM	Casey 7', 64'; Hoppenot 88'	Report		Stadium: PPL Park; Attendance: 19,013; Referee: Baldomero Toledo

June 30, 2013 Match 18	New York	2–0	Houston	Harrison, New Jersey
2:00 PM	Espíndola 60'; Steele 88'	Report		Stadium: Red Bull Arena; Attendance: 25,483; Referee: Hilario Grajeda

July 4, 2013 Match 19	Colorado	2–0	New York	Commerce City, Colorado
9:30 PM	Sturgis 47'; Brown 68'	Report		Stadium: Dick's Sporting Goods Park; Attendance: 18,359; Referee: Armando Villarreal

July 13, 2013 Match 20	New York	4–0	Montreal	Harrison, New Jersey
7:00 PM	Alexander 10'; Henry 16'; Cahill 63'; Luyindula 88'	Report		Stadium: Red Bull Arena; Attendance: 17,235; Referee: Ricardo Salazar

July 20, 2013 Match 21	Toronto	0–0	New York	Toronto, Canada
4:00 PM		Report		Stadium: BMO Field; Attendance: 19,444; Referee: Jorge González

July 27, 2013 Match 22	New York	4–3	Real Salt Lake	Harrison, New Jersey
7:00 PM	Cahill 11'; Espíndola 23' (pen.), 89'; McCarty 90+4'	Report	Saborío 45' (pen.), 80', 82'	Stadium: Red Bull Arena; Attendance: 18,604; Referee: Silviu Petrescu

August 3, 2013 Match 23	Sporting Kansas City	2–3	New York	Kansas City, Kansas
8:00 PM	Kamara 45'; Dwyer 90+2'	Report	Steele 27'; Espíndola 63'; Sam 69'	Stadium: Sporting Park; Attendance: 21.304; Referee: Chris Penso

August 10, 2013 Match 24	Columbus	2–0	New York	Columbus, Ohio
7:30 PM	Higuaín 62' (pen.), 76'	Report		Stadium: Columbus Crew Stadium; Attendance: 19,080; Referee: Allen Chapman

August 17, 2013 Match 25	New York	0–0	Philadelphia	Harrison, New Jersey
8:00 PM		Report		Stadium: Red Bull Arena; Attendance: 25,355; Referee: Jair Marrufo

August 25, 2013 Match 26	Chivas USA	3–2	New York	Carson, California
5:00 PM	Morales 30'; Torres 47' (pen.), 81'	Report	Cahill 31'; McCarty 86'	Stadium: The Home Depot Center; Attendance: 8,103; Referee: Kevin Stott

August 31, 2013 Match 27	New York	2–1	D.C. United	Harrison, New Jersey
8:30 PM	Sam 8'; Cahill 38'	Report	DeLeon 36'	Stadium: Red Bull Arena; Attendance: 17,372; Referee: Juan Guzman

September 8, 2013 Match 28	Houston	1–4	New York	Houston, Texas
5:00 PM	Johnson 18'	Report	Alexander 14'; Henry 47'; Steele 59'; Sam 88'	Stadium: BBVA Compass Stadium; Attendance: 18,501; Referee: Chris Penso

September 14, 2013 Match 29	New York	2–0	Toronto	Harrison, New Jersey
7:00 PM	Henry 32'; Espíndola 80'	Report		Stadium: Red Bull Arena; Attendance: 17,236; Referee: Edvin Jurisevic

September 22, 2013 Match 30	New York	1–0	Dallas	Harrison, New Jersey
5:00 PM	Da Cruz 76' (o.g)	Report		Stadium: Red Bull Arena; Attendance: 18,976; Referee: Matthew Foerster

September 29, 2013 Match 31	Seattle	1–1	New York	Seattle, Washington
9:00 PM	Evans 45' (pen.)	Report	Cahill 76'	Stadium: CenturyLink Field; Attendance: 39,083; Referee: Kevin Scott

October 5, 2013 Match 32	New York	2–2	New England	Harrison, New Jersey
7:00 PM	Espíndola 14'; Cahill 90+7'	Report	Nguyen 85'; Fagúndez 90+1'	Stadium: Red Bull Arena; Attendance: 25,219; Referee: Fotis Bazakos

October 20, 2013 Match 33	Houston	0–3	New York	Houston, Texas
5:00 PM		Report	Cahill 1'; Sekagya 65'; Wright-Phillips 75'	Stadium: BBVA Compass Stadium; Attendance: 22,345; Referee: Hilario Grajeda

October 27, 2013 Match 34	New York	5–2	Chicago	Harrison, New Jersey
5:00 PM	Henry 24'; Sekagya 49'; Sam 56'; Alexander 77'; Steele 84'	Report	Magee 6'; Amarikwa 90'	Stadium: Red Bull Arena; Attendance: 25,219; Referee: Ismail Elfath

=== MLS Cup ===
==== Bracket ====
Knockout
E4	Houston	3
E5	Montreal	0
W4	Seattle	2
W5	Colorado	0

Conference semifinals
E1	New York	2	1	3
E4	Houston (a.e.t.)	2	2	4
Eastern Conference
E2	Kansas City (a.e.t.)	1	3	4
E3	New England	2	1	3
W1	Portland	2	3	5
W4	Seattle	1	2	3
Western Conference
W2	Salt Lake (a.e.t.)	0	2	2
W3	Los Angeles	1	0	1

Conference finals
E4	Houston	0	1	1
E2	Kansas City	0	2	2
W1	Portland	2	0	2
W2	Salt Lake	4	1	5

MLS Cup
E2	Kansas City (p)	1 (7)
W2	Salt Lake	1 (6)

==== Matches ====
Kickoff times are in EDT

November 3, 2013 Conference Semi's Leg 1	Houston Dynamo	2–2	New York	Houston, Texas
3:30pm EST	García (yellow card) 62'; Clark 51'; Cummings 90+2'	Report	Cahill 22'; Alexander 32'; Steele (yellow card) 36'; Henry (yellow card) 54'; Olave (red card) 65'; Carney (yellow card) 84'; Barklage (yellow card) 84'	Stadium: BBVA Compass Stadium; Attendance: 20,626; Referee: Ricardo Salazar

November 6, 2013 Conference Semi's Leg 2	New York	1–2 a.e.t. (3–4 agg.)	Houston Dynamo	Harrison, New Jersey
8:00pm EST	Wright-Phillips 23'; Barklage (yellow card) 25'	Report	Davis 36'; Ashe (yellow card) 90+3'; Cummings 104'	Stadium: Red Bull Arena; Attendance: 22,264; Referee: Geoff Gamble

=== U.S. Open Cup ===
Kickoff times are in EDT

May 29, 2013 Third Round	New York	2–0	Reading United	Harrison, New Jersey
7:30 PM	Espíndola 61'; Sam 67'; Holgersson (yellow card) 90'	Report	Sweat (yellow card) 90+4'	Stadium: Red Bull Arena; Attendance: 3,867; Referee: Mark Gorak

June 12, 2013 Fourth Round	New England	4–2	New York	Boston
7:30 PM	Rowe 4', 37'; Imbongo 51'; Cisse (yellow card) 76'; Barnes (yellow card) 78'; Tierney 87'	Report	Barklage (yellow card) 10' (yellow-red card) 90'; Espíndola (yellow card) 24', (goal) 30'; McCarty (yellow card) 45'; Holgersson (yellow card) 55'; Steele 61'	Stadium: Soldiers Field Soccer Stadium; Attendance: 2,500; Referee: Matthew Foerster

== Awards and recognition ==
=== MLS Player of the Week ===
Week	Player	Week's Statline
9	(Australia) Tim Cahill	2G (39', 89')
23	(England) Lloyd Sam	1G (69'), 1A (63')

=== MLS Goal of the Week ===
Week	Player	Goal	Report
5	(France) Thierry Henry	81'	
11	(France) Thierry Henry	88'	
34	(Australia) Tim Cahill	1'	

=== MLS Save of the Week ===
Week	Player	Save
17	(United States) Luis Robles	

== See also ==
- 2013 in American soccer
- 2013 Major League Soccer season
