= Matt Miazga =

American soccer player (born 1995)

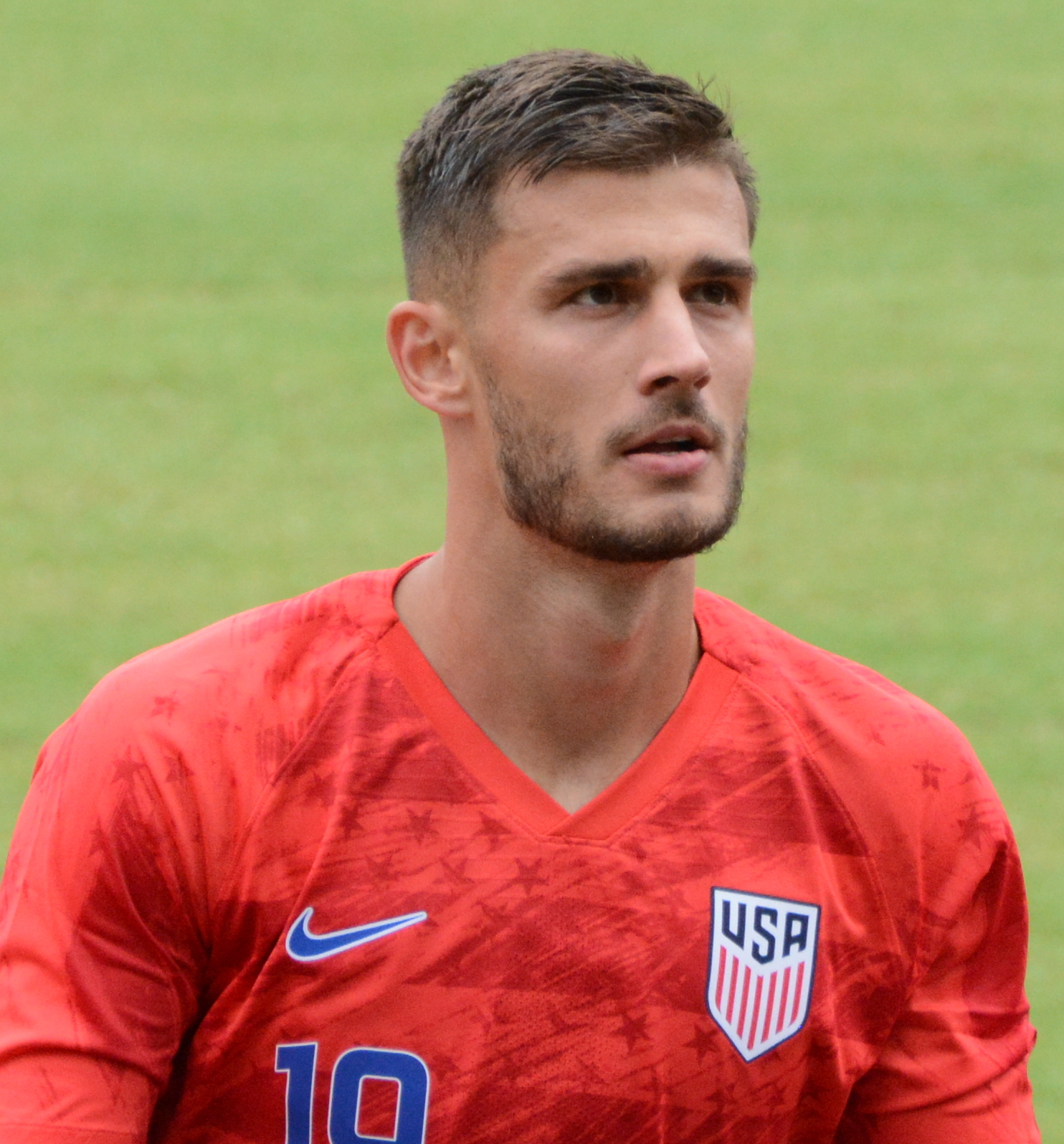
- Miazga with the United States in 2019

Personal information
- Full name: Matthew Miazga
- Date of birth: July 19, 1995 (age 31)
- Place of birth: Clifton, New Jersey, US
- Height: 6 ft 4 in (1.93 m)
- Position: Center-back

Team information
- Current team: New York City FC
- Number: 3

Youth career
- 2009–2013: New York Red Bulls

Senior career*
Years	Team	Apps	(Gls)
2013–2015	New York Red Bulls	34	(1)
2016–2022	Chelsea	2	(0)
2016–2018	→ Vitesse (loan)	55	(3)
2018–2019	→ Nantes (loan)	8	(0)
2019–2020	→ Reading (loan)	38	(2)
2020–2021	→ Anderlecht (loan)	30	(1)
2021–2022	→ Alavés (loan)	11	(0)
2022–2026	FC Cincinnati	88	(2)
2026	FC Cincinnati 2	1	(0)
2026–	New York City FC	0	(0)

International career^{‡}
2012	Poland U18	1	(0)
2013	United States U18	1	(0)
2014–2015	United States U20	17	(0)
2014–2016	United States U23	7	(1)
2015–2023	United States	28	(1)
Medal record
Representing United States
CONCACAF Gold Cup
Winner	2017 United States
CONCACAF Nations League
Winner	2021 United States
- * Club domestic league appearances and goals as of 03:03, August 30, 2026 (UTC) ‡ National team caps and goals as of July 12, 2023

Matthew Miazga (born July 19, 1995) is an American professional soccer player who plays as a center-back for Major League Soccer club New York City FC.

Having come through the academy system of the New York Red Bulls, Miazga made his debut in the 2013 Major League Soccer season, and won two MLS Supporters' Shields with the team. With Vitesse, he helped win the 2016–17 KNVB Cup. Miazga won his third Supporters' Shield with FC Cincinnati in 2023.

== Club career ==
=== Youth ===
From Clifton, New Jersey, Miazga attended Clifton High School for one year before he left and joined the New York Red Bulls Academy in 2009 at under-14 level. While with the under-16 side, Miazga helped the Red Bulls win the U.S. Soccer Development Academy National Championship in 2012.

In 2013, Miazga had signed a letter of intent to play for the Michigan Wolverines men's soccer program. However, after offers from Europe and the New York Red Bulls, Miazga turned down his scholarship offer to play in college and signed with the Red Bulls at the professional level.

=== New York Red Bulls ===
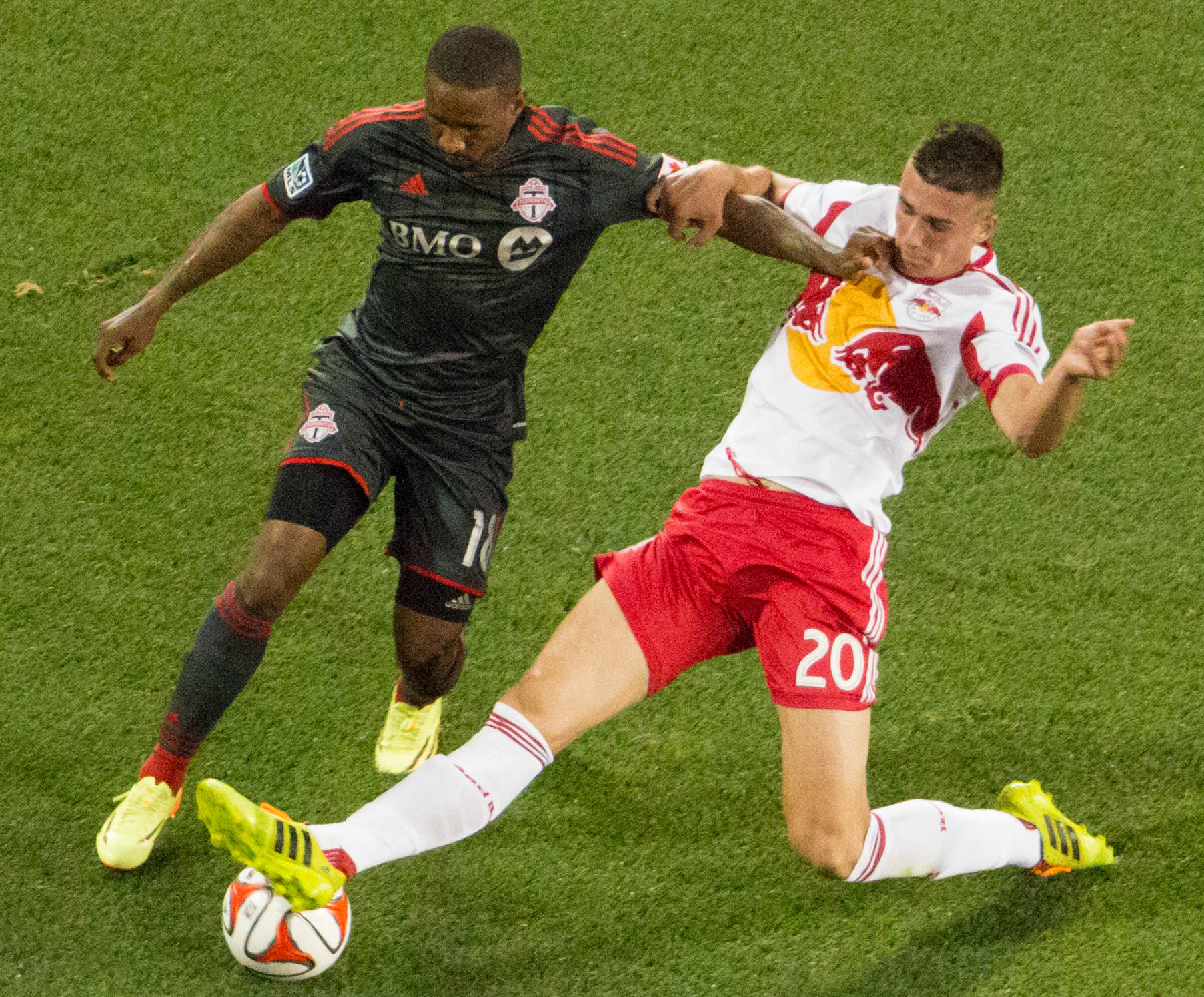
Matt Miazga tackles Toronto FC's Jermain Defoe in June 2014.

On May 30, 2013, it was announced Miazga had signed a homegrown contract with the New York Red Bulls, becoming the eighth player to sign a homegrown contract with the club. Miazga made his first-team debut at age 18 as a substitute for Markus Holgersson in the 76th minute of a 4–1 win at Houston Dynamo on September 8, 2013.

Miazga started playing more frequently during the 2014 season. Also, in August 2014, he signed an endorsement deal with Nike and played in the Major League Soccer Homegrown Game. Miazga made his CONCACAF Champions League debut in a 1–1 draw against the Montreal Impact on October 22.

During the 2015 season, Miazga established himself as a starter for the club, forming a partnership in the backline with Damien Perrinelle. He was sent off for two bookings in a 2–1 victory against New York City FC in the first ever Hudson River Derby match on May 10. On June 28, he scored his first goal as a professional in a 3–1 derby victory over the same opponents at Yankee Stadium. He celebrated by pretending to swing a baseball bat, making fun of the fact that their rivals play in a baseball stadium. Miazga was sent off for the second time of the season on September 25 in a 5–2 loss to Orlando City SC at the Red Bull Arena.

After strong performances against New York City FC's David Villa and Toronto FC's Sebastian Giovinco, Miazga became regarded as one of the best defensive players in the league and earned MLS team of the week appearances four times throughout the season. His strong defensive play throughout the 2015 season helped New York win their second Supporters' Shield in three years by having one of the strongest defenses in the league. At the end of the season, the Red Bulls offered Miazga a designated player deal which would have made him one of the highest paid players on the team. However, Miazga turned down the offer, stating his desire to play in Europe.

=== Chelsea and successive loans ===
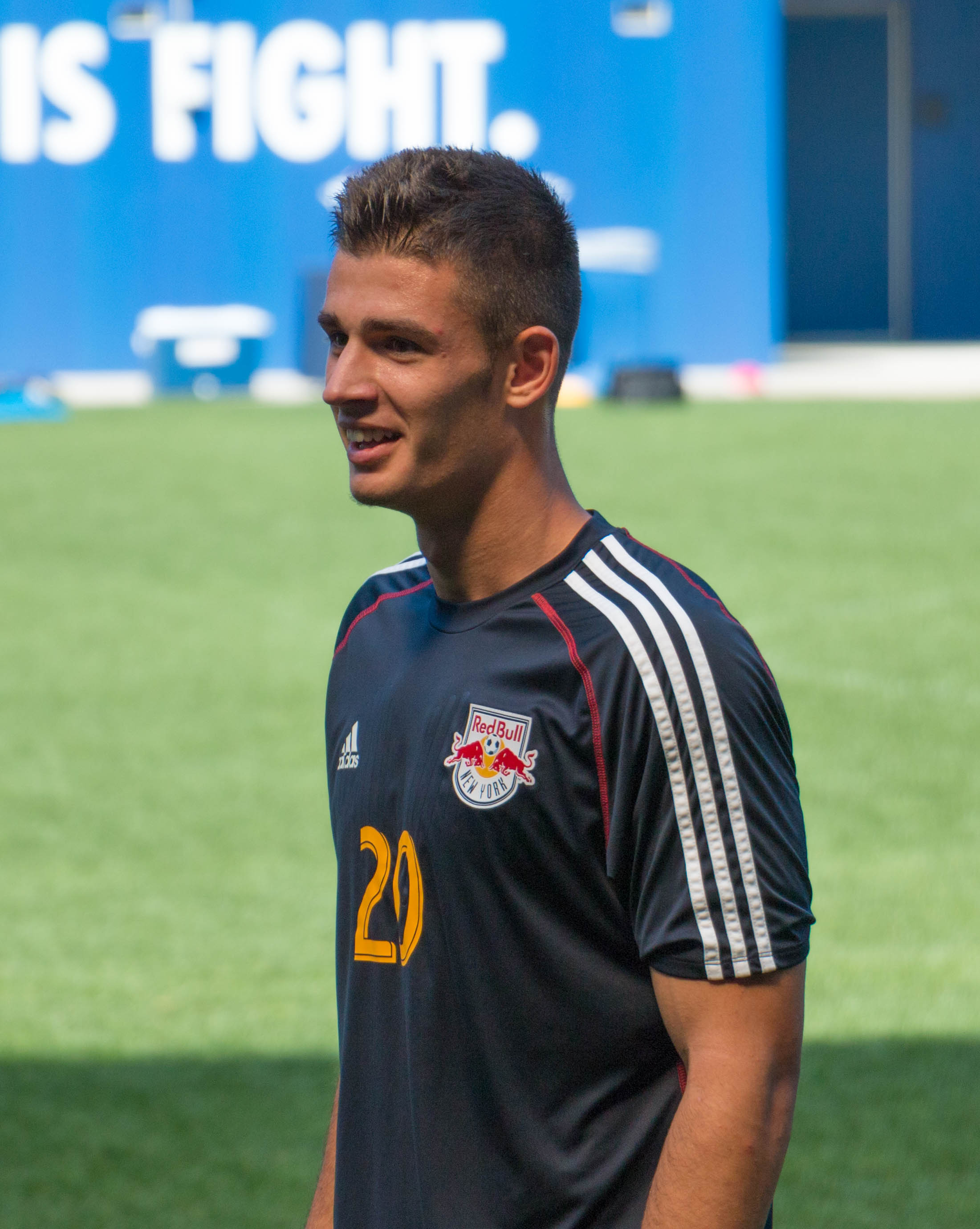
Matt Miazga, New York Red Bulls

On January 30, 2016, Miazga joined Premier League club Chelsea on a four-and-a-half-year deal for a reported £3.5 million (US$5 million). Three days later, he was given the number 20 shirt for the remainder of the 2015–16 campaign.

He was first included in a Chelsea matchday squad on February 16, remaining an unused substitute in their 2–1 loss at Paris Saint-Germain in the first leg of the round of 16 of the UEFA Champions League. With both John Terry and Gary Cahill injured, Miazga made his Chelsea debut starting in a 4–0 Premier League victory away to Aston Villa on April 2, 2016. After an impressive debut, Miazga started his second match against Swansea City, but was substituted at half-time.

==== Vitesse (loan) ====
On August 31, 2016, Miazga was loaned to Dutch Eredivisie club Vitesse for the 2016–17 season, after a deal with Espanyol fell through due to paperwork. On September 10, Miazga made his debut for Jong Vitesse in a 2–2 draw against SV Spakenburg in the Tweede Divisie The following day, he was on the substitutes' bench for the first-team against Ajax, although he was an unused substitution as Vitesse lost 1–0. He made his Eredivisie debut on September 25, coming off the bench in the 64th minute and provided an assist to Lewis Baker in a 2–1 away defeat to Twente. On December 14, Miazga scored his firs goal for Vitesse in a KNVB Cup tie against Jodan Boys, which finished 4–0. He went on to win the Cup with Vitesse in his first season at the club by beating AZ Alkmaar 2–0 in the final. He played in every match of the successful cup campaign.

On July 28, 2017, Miazga's loan spell at Vitesse was extended for the 2017–18 campaign.

==== FC Nantes (loan) ====
On August 6, 2018, Miazga joined Ligue 1 club Nantes on a season-long loan deal. Miazga made his Ligue 1 debut on August 18, 2018, starting and playing 90 minutes in a 2–0 loss to Dijon FCO.

==== Reading (loan) ====
On January 25, 2019, Miazga joined Championship club Reading until the end of the season after returning from Nantes. After a successful loan spell, Reading decided to loan him again for the 2019–20 season. On October 19, Miazga scored his first goal for Reading in a 1–0 win over Preston North End.

==== Anderlecht (loan) ====
On October 3, 2020, Miazga joined Belgian side Anderlecht on loan until the end of 2020–21 season.

==== Alavés (loan) ====
On August 20, 2021, Miazga joined Spanish side Alavés on loan until the end of 2021–22 season.

=== FC Cincinnati ===
On August 5, 2022, it was announced that Miazga had returned to the United States, signing with MLS side FC Cincinnati on a three-and-a-half-year deal. In 2023, he was announced as an MLS All Star and named the 2023 MLS Defender of the Year, following an event where he entered the officials' locker room to contest yellow cards received at the end of a game, resulting in a one game suspension and an investigation by the MLS into the incident. On September 14, 2026, FC Cincinnati announced that they had bought out Miazga's contract, ending his tenure with the club.

=== New York City FC ===
On September 22, 2026, Miazga was selected off waivers by New York City FC, joining the club for the final weeks of the 2026 season.

== International career ==
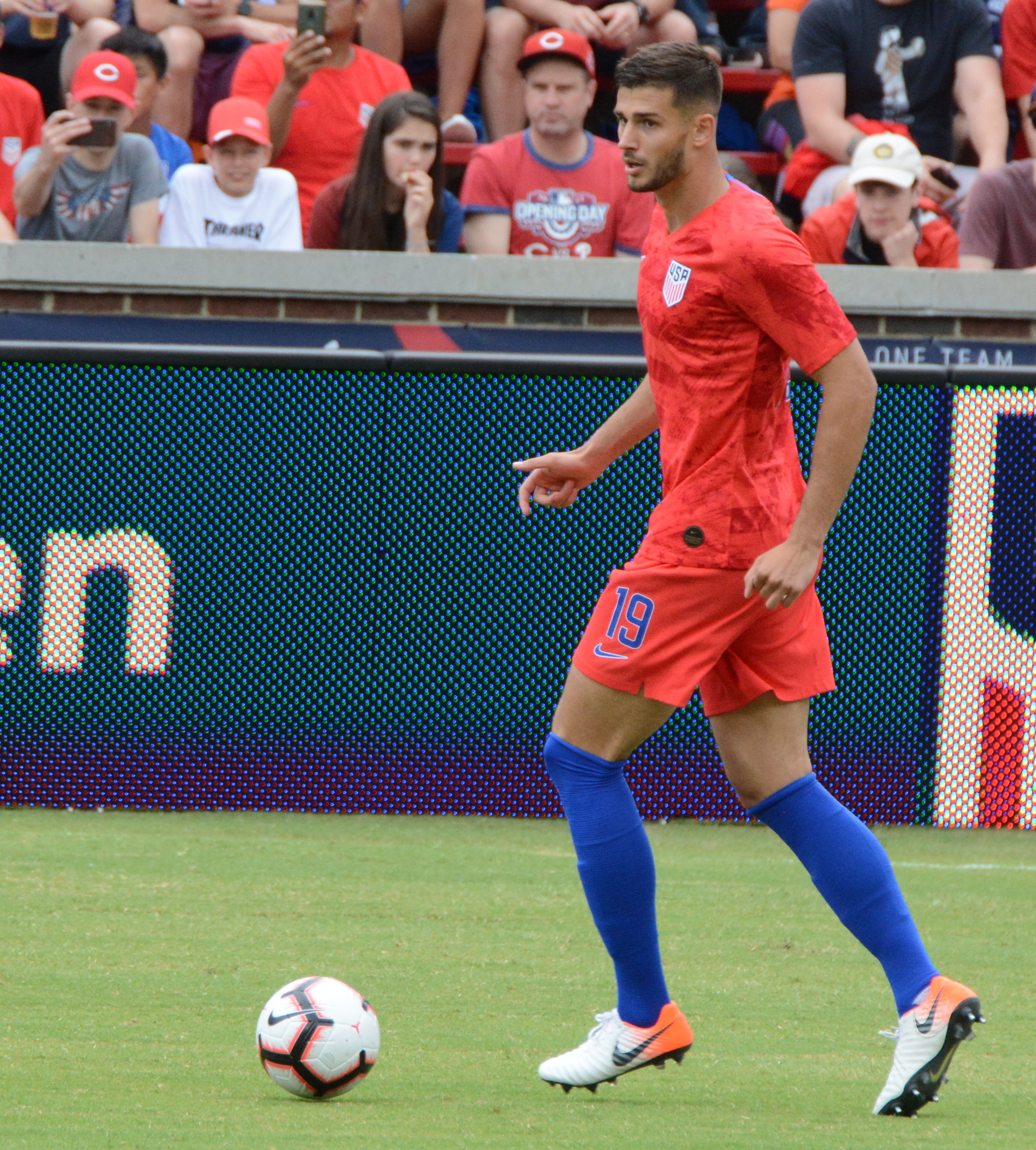
Miazga playing for the United States in a 2019 friendly against Venezuela

Internationally, Miazga has represented the United States at under-14, 15, 18, 20 and 23 levels. He also played one match for the Poland under-18 team in 2012. In May 2013, Miazga played for the United States under-18 side that participated in the 19th Annual International Juniors Tournament in Portugal.

In August and September 2014, Miazga turned down two separate call-ups to the Poland under-20 team. He cited previous commitments to the United States under-20 team and maintained he had not made a final decision about which nation to represent at senior level. In October 2014, Poland U-20 coach Marcin Dorna stated he had not given up on Miazga and that the Red Bulls player might still play for his team. Miazga played for the U.S. under-20 team at the 2015 CONCACAF U-20 Championship and helped the team qualify for the 2015 FIFA U-20 World Cup in New Zealand. Miazga was a standout performer at the 2015 U-20 World Cup, in which the Americans fell in the quarter finals to eventual champions Serbia on penalties.

On November 5, 2015, Miazga was quoted as saying, "I'm totally undecided. I'll wait to see who calls me first to the main national team and see what happens then." He received his first United States call-up for the 2018 FIFA World Cup qualifiers matches. He earned his first senior cap against Saint Vincent and the Grenadines on November 13, 2015, coming on as a 63rd-minute substitute in a 6–1 win at Busch Stadium in St. Louis. On July 15, 2017, Miazga scored the Americans' third goal in a 3–0 win over Nicaragua in the 2017 CONCACAF Gold Cup

== Personal life ==
During his time at the Red Bulls, Miazga lived with his Polish immigrant parents Adam and Elżbieta in Clifton. Miazga's idols are Carles Puyol and Gerard Piqué.

Miazga is a devout Christian who frequently makes reference to his faith in social media posts.

== Career statistics ==
=== Club ===
As of match played August 29, 2026

Appearances and goals by club, season and competition
Club	Season	League			National cup (Note: Includes U.S. Open Cup, KNVB Cup, Coupe de France, FA Cup, Belgian Cup and Copa del Rey)		League cup (Note: Includes EFL Cup and Leagues Cup)		Continental		Other		Total	
Club	Season	Division	Apps	Goals	Apps	Goals	Apps	Goals	Apps	Goals	Apps	Goals	Apps	Goals
New York Red Bulls	2013	MLS	1	0	—		—		—		—		1	0
New York Red Bulls	2014	MLS	7	0	1	0	—		1 (Note: Appearance(s) in CONCACAF Champions League/Cup)	0	—		9	0
New York Red Bulls	2015	MLS	26	1	2	0	—		—		4 (Note: Appearances in MLS Cup playoffs)	0	32	1
New York Red Bulls	Total		34	1	3	0	—		1	0	4	0	42	1
Chelsea	2015–16	Premier League	2	0	—		—		—		—		2	0
Vitesse (loan)	2016–17	Eredivisie	23	0	6	1	—		—		—		29	1
Vitesse (loan)	2017–18	Eredivisie	32	3	1	0	—		6 (Note: Appearances in UEFA Europa League)	0	4 (Note: Appearances in Eredivisie European play-offs)	1	43	4
Vitesse (loan)	Total		55	3	7	1	—		6	0	4	1	72	5
Nantes (loan)	2018–19	Ligue 1	8	0	1	0	—		—		—		9	0
Reading (loan)	2018–19	Championship	18	0	—		—		—		—		18	0
Reading (loan)	2019–20	Championship	20	2	3	0	1	0	—		—		24	2
Reading (loan)	Total		38	2	3	0	1	0	—		—		42	2
Anderlecht (loan)	2020–21	Belgian Pro League	30	1	3	0	—		—		—		33	1
Alavés (loan)	2021–22	La Liga	11	0	1	0	—		—		—		12	0
FC Cincinnati	2022	MLS	10	2	—		—		—		2	0	12	2
FC Cincinnati	2023	MLS	27	0	4	0	3	0	—		2	0	36	0
FC Cincinnati	2024	MLS	16	0	—		—		4	0	—		20	0
FC Cincinnati	2025	MLS	21	0	—		2	0	—		—		23	0
FC Cincinnati	2026	MLS	14	0	—		2	0	1	0	—		17	0
FC Cincinnati	Total		88	2	4	0	7	0	5	0	4	0	108	2
FC Cincinnati 2	2026	MLS Next Pro	1	0	—		—		—		—		1	0
New York City FC	2026	MLS	0	0	—		—		—		—		0	0
Career total			268	9	22	1	8	0	12	0	12	1	322	11

=== International ===
As of match played July 12, 2023

Appearances and goals by national team and year
National team	Year	Apps	Goals
United States	2015	1	0
United States	2016	1	0
United States	2017	2	1
United States	2018	7	0
United States	2019	7	0
United States	2020	2	0
United States	2021	2	0
United States	2022	0	0
United States	2023	6	0
Total		28	1

Scores and results list United States' goal tally first, score column indicates score after each Miazga goal.

List of international goals scored by Matt Miazga
No.	Date	Venue	Opponent	Score	Result	Competition
1	July 15, 2017	FirstEnergy Stadium, Cleveland, United States	Nicaragua	3–0	3–0	2017 CONCACAF Gold Cup

== Honors ==
New York Red Bulls

- Supporters' Shield: 2013, 2015

Vitesse

- KNVB Cup: 2016–17

FC Cincinnati

- Supporters' Shield: 2023

United States

- CONCACAF Gold Cup: 2017
- CONCACAF Nations League: 2019–20

Individual

- U.S. Soccer Young Male Player Of The Year: 2015
- MLS All-Star: 2023
- MLS Defender of the Year: 2023
- MLS Best XI: 2023
