= Ryan Maduro =

American soccer player (born 1986)

Personal information
- Date of birth: April 6, 1986 (age 40)
- Place of birth: Providence, Rhode Island, U.S.
- Height: 5 ft 10 in (1.78 m)
- Position: Attacking midfielder

Team information
- Current team: Fylkir
- Number: 22

Youth career
- 2004–2008: Providence Friars

Senior career*
Years	Team	Apps	(Gls)
2009	Rhode Island Stingrays	9	(0)
2010	Forest City London	7	(0)
2012	New York Red Bulls	0	(0)
2013	Real Boston Rams	2	(0)
2014	Fylkir	11	(1)
2015–	Rhode Island Oceaneers		
- * Club domestic league appearances and goals as of May 25, 2014

Ryan Maduro (born April 6, 1986) is an American soccer player who currently plays for the Rhode Island Oceaneers.

== Career ==
=== College and amateur ===
Maduro attended Mt. Hope High School and was regarded as one of the top players in Rhode Island before enrolling at Providence College in 2004. In 2006 Maduro became only the second Friar to be named a first-team All-American and the first to be named first-team All-Big East. During his four years with the Friars, Maduro appeared in 78 matches and scored 14 goals while assisting on 22 others.

=== Professional ===
Maduro signed with the Rhode Island Stingrays in May 2009. While with Rhode Island Maduro appeared in 9 matches and recorded 3 assists. In November 2009 he went on trial with C.D. Santa Clara of Portugal's Liga de Honra but did not sign with the club. For the 2010 season Maduro joined Ontario club Forest City London.

During the 2011 season Maduro trained with New York Red Bulls and played for the club's reserve side in the 2011 MLS Reserve Division.

After a pre-season trial with the club Maduro signed with New York on March 19, 2012. Maduro made his professional debut for New York on May 29, 2012, in a 3–0 victory over the Charleston Battery in the third round of the US Open Cup. This was his only appearance for New York before being waived by the club on July 28, 2012.

In May 2013, Maduro signed for Real Boston Rams. He made his debut in a 3–0 defeat to CFC Azul.

In May 2014, Maduro signed for Fylkir; an athletic club in Árbær, in the eastern part of Reykjavík, the capital of Iceland. Maduro made his debut on May 4, 2014, entering in the 63rd minute in a 1–0 loss to Stjarnan. Maduro made his first start on May 8, 2014, in a 3–0 loss to Hafnarfjordur.
