= Ryan Meara =

American professional soccer player (born 1990)

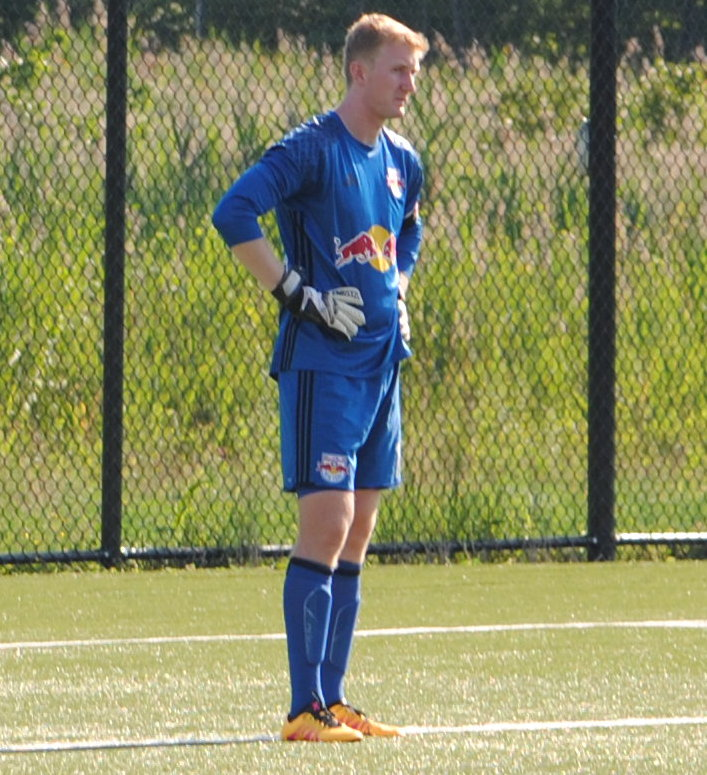
- Meara in 2012

Personal information
- Full name: Ryan Meara
- Date of birth: November 15, 1990 (age 35)
- Place of birth: Crestwood, New York, U.S.
- Height: 6 ft 4 in (1.93 m)
- Position: Goalkeeper

Youth career
- 2004–2007: Fordham Prep
- 2007–2008: Reading

College career
Years	Team	Apps	(Gls)
2008–2011	Fordham Rams	74	(0)

Senior career*
Years	Team	Apps	(Gls)
2009	Long Island Rough Riders	10	(0)
2010–2011	Jersey Express	28	(0)
2012–2025	New York Red Bulls	43	(0)
2015	→ New York City FC (loan)	1	(0)
2016–2019	New York Red Bulls II	30	(0)
- * Club domestic league appearances and goals as of March 25, 2024

Ryan Meara (born November 15, 1990) is an American retired professional soccer player who played as a goalkeeper.

== Career ==
=== College and amateur ===
Meara was raised in Yonkers, New York and attended Fordham Preparatory School before enrolling at Fordham University in 2008. He also trained with Reading of England with their youth academies in July 2007 and February 2008. While at Fordham he made 74 appearances and had 31 clean sheets. His 31 shutouts are a school record. In total, Meara owned nine Fordham University goal keeper records including career games in goal, minutes played, goal against average in a career (0.87) and a single season (0.65 in 2011) and save percentage in a single season (.862 in 2011). In 2010 Meara was named team captain for the Rams. Meara was named All-Atlantic Ten three times before earning conference Defensive Player of the Year honors in 2011.

During the 2009 season, Meara also played for the Long Island Rough Riders of the USL Premier Development League. In 2010, he joined Jersey Express and was voted the league's goalkeeper of the year as he recorded 8 clean sheets in 12 appearances during the 2010 PDL season. In two years with Jersey Express, he made 28 appearances for the club.

=== Professional ===
Meara was drafted 31st overall by New York Red Bulls in the 2012 MLS SuperDraft and signed with the club on February 6, 2012. On March 11, Meara started his first game against FC Dallas. On April 28, he recorded his first professional shutout against the New England Revolution. Meara started the first 18 games of the season and emerged as a leading candidate for the MLS Rookie of the Year Award. However, on July 8 he sustained a hip injury during a game which required surgery and ended his season.

On December 11, 2014, New York Red Bulls announced that Meara would be loaned to New York City FC for the 2015 season. After suffering a torn meniscus in preseason training, Meara would make his first start for NYCFC on April 24, 2015. It was his first Major League Soccer appearance after a hip injury ended his rookie season on July 8, 2012, a span of 1,020 days.

Meara returned to the Red Bulls at the conclusion of the 2015 season. On March 26, the New York Red Bulls announced that they had loaned Meara and six other first team players to New York Red Bulls II for their home opener. He went on to make his first appearance for New York Red Bulls II on March 26, appearing as a starter in a 2–2 draw against Toronto FC II. After helping lead New York to the USL regular season title, Meara helped the club advance to the 2016 USL Cup Final by making two saves in a penalty shootout as top-seeded NYRBII defeated second-seeded Louisville City FC 4–3 in the shootout of the Eastern Conference Final. On October 23, 2016, Meara captained New York in a 5–1 victory over Swope Park Rangers in the 2016 USL Cup Final.

On June 14, 2017, Meara led New York to a 1–0 victory over league rival and former club New York City FC in the 2017 Lamar Hunt U.S. Open Cup. On July 13, 2017, Meara in his role as keeper for New York in the Cup led his team to a 1–0 victory over New England Revolution, advancing to the semifinals of the Open Cup.

On May 10, 2022, Meara recorded a shutout for New York in a 3–0 victory over DC United, helping the club advance to Round of 16 in the 2022 U.S. Open Cup. Almost a year to the date, on May 9, 2023, Meara recorded another shutout for New York in 1–0 victory over rival DC United, helping his side advance to the Round of 16 of the 2023 U.S. Open Cup.

On March 23, 2024, Meara recorded his first MLS clean sheet since 2020 in a 4–0 victory over Inter Miami CF.

On January 22, 2025, ahead of the upcoming 2025 season, Meara announced his retirement from playing soccer after 13 seasons in the professional game.

=== International ===
Meara, who qualified for Irish citizenship through his grandparents, was named to the Republic of Ireland U-21 team on April 30, 2012. However, the Red Bulls did not permit him to train with Ireland, despite the fact that the call-up would not require him to miss any MLS games.

In June 2014, Ireland's senior team used Red Bulls' training facilities before a friendly match against Portugal, and Meara joined the Irish for a practice session. Ireland coach Martin O'Neill said he would "keep an eye on things".

== Honors ==
=== Club ===
New York Red Bulls

- MLS Supporters' Shield (2): 2013, 2018

New York Red Bulls II

- USL Cup (1): 2016

=== Individual ===
- Fordham Athletic Hall of Fame

== Career statistics ==
As of match played March 23, 2024

Club	Season	League			National cup		Continental		Other		Total	
Club	Season	Division	Apps	Goals	Apps	Goals	Apps	Goals	Apps	Goals	Apps	Goals
Long Island Rough Riders	2009	PDL	10	0	—		—		—		10	0
Jersey Express	2010	PDL	12	0	—		—		—		12	0
Jersey Express	2011	PDL	16	0	—		—		—		16	0
Jersey Express	Total		28	0	0	0	0	0	0	0	28	0
New York Red Bulls	2012	MLS	18	0	2	0	—		0	0	20	0
New York Red Bulls	2013	MLS	0	0	2	0	—		0	0	2	0
New York Red Bulls	2014	MLS	0	0	1	0	4 (Note: Appearance(s) in CONCACAF Champions League)	0	0	0	5	0
New York Red Bulls	2016	MLS	0	0	1	0	1	0	0	0	2	0
New York Red Bulls	2017	MLS	0	0	5	0	—		0	0	5	0
New York Red Bulls	2018	MLS	3	0	1	0	—		0	0	4	0
New York Red Bulls	2019	MLS	1	0	1	0	—		0	0	2	0
New York Red Bulls	2020	MLS	13	0	—		—		1 (Note: Appearance(s) in MLS Cup Playoffs)	0	14	0
New York Red Bulls	2021	MLS	0	0	0	0	—		0	0	0	0
New York Red Bulls	2022	MLS	1	0	2	0	—		0	0	3	0
New York Red Bulls	2023	MLS	0	0	2	0	—		0	0	2	0
New York Red Bulls	2024	MLS	7	0	0	0	1 (Note: Appearance(s) in Leagues Cup)	0	0	0	8	0
New York Red Bulls	Total		43	0	17	0	6	0	1	0	67	0
New York City FC (loan)	2015	MLS	1	0	0	0	0	0	—		1	0
New York Red Bulls II (loan)	2016	USL	21	0	—		—		4 (Note: Appearance(s) in USL Championship Playoffs)	0	25	0
New York Red Bulls II (loan)	2017	USL	3	0	—		—		—		3	0
New York Red Bulls II (loan)	2018	USL	4	0	—		—		—		4	0
New York Red Bulls II (loan)	2019	USL	2	0	—		—		—		2	0
New York Red Bulls II (loan)	Total		30	0	0	0	0	0	4	0	34	0
Career total			112	0	17	0	6	0	5	0	140	0
