= Victor Pálsson =

Icelandic footballer (born 1991)

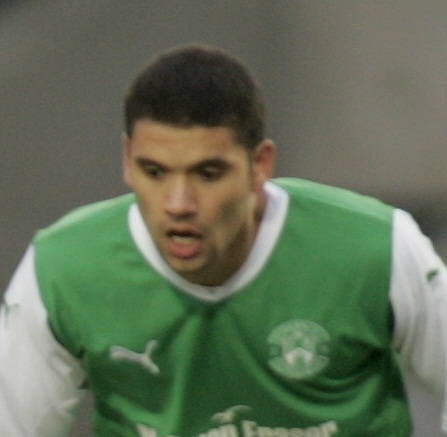
- Guðlaugur playing for Hibernian in 2011

Personal information
- Full name: Guðlaugur Victor Pálsson
- Date of birth: 30 April 1991 (age 35)
- Place of birth: Reykjavík, Iceland
- Height: 1.86 m (6 ft 1 in)
- Positions: Defensive midfielder; defender

Team information
- Current team: Horsens
- Number: 26

Youth career
- –2003: Fjölnir
- 2004–2007: Fylkir
- 2007–2009: AGF
- 2009–2010: Liverpool

Senior career*
Years	Team	Apps	(Gls)
2010–2011	Liverpool	0	(0)
2010–2011	→ Dagenham & Redbridge (loan)	2	(0)
2011–2012	Hibernian	31	(1)
2012	New York Red Bulls	16	(0)
2012	→ NEC (loan)	12	(2)
2013–2014	NEC	38	(2)
2014–2015	Helsingborgs IF	33	(3)
2015–2017	Esbjerg fB	35	(3)
2017–2019	FC Zürich	47	(1)
2019–2021	Darmstadt 98	67	(6)
2021–2022	Schalke 04	28	(0)
2022–2023	D.C. United	28	(0)
2023–2024	Eupen	35	(2)
2024–2025	Plymouth Argyle	28	(0)
2025–	Horsens	25	(1)

International career^{‡}
2007	Iceland U17	7	(0)
2008–2009	Iceland U19	6	(0)
2009–2012	Iceland U21	11	(0)
2014–	Iceland	64	(6)
- * Club domestic league appearances and goals as of 2 June 2026 ‡ National team caps and goals as of 16 November 2026

Guðlaugur Victor Pálsson (born 30 April 1991) is an Icelandic professional footballer who plays as a defensive midfielder or defender for Danish Superliga club Horsens and the Iceland national team. He has previously played for Liverpool, Dagenham & Redbridge, Hibernian, New York Red Bulls, NEC, Helsingborgs IF, Esbjerg fB, Zürich, Darmstadt 98, Schalke 04, D.C. United, Eupen and Plymouth Argyle.

== Club career ==
=== Early career ===
Guðlaugur was born in Reykjavík to an Icelandic mother and a Portuguese father. His paternal grandfather was a native of Mozambique. He played for Fjölnir but he decided to move to the neighbouring club Fylkir to get a chance to play on higher level. He then moved to Danish side AGF Aarhus in 2007.

Guðlaugur joined Premier League team Liverpool in 2009. He played for Liverpool reserves and served as team captain but failed to make the breakthrough into the first-team. He went on loan to Dagenham & Redbridge in November 2010, making his debut for the Daggers in the 1st round of the FA Cup in a 1–1 draw with Leyton Orient. He made three appearances for the club, including an FA Cup tie, before returning to Liverpool.

=== Hibernian ===
On 28 January 2011, Guðlaugur signed an 18-month contract with Scottish Premier League club Hibernian. Guðlaugur was given squad number 91, since 1991 was his birth-year. He made his debut in a 3–0 defeat against Dundee United two days later. Guðlaugur scored his first goal for the club with a penalty in a 2–1 win against Kilmarnock on 12 February. Guðlaugur played regularly under the management of Colin Calderwood, but featured less regularly after Calderwood was replaced by Pat Fenlon. On 10 January 2012, Hibernian announced that Victor had left the club with immediate effect after an agreement was reached to cancel his contract.

=== New York Red Bulls ===
Sky Sports reported on 24 January 2012 that Guðlaugur was close to agreeing to terms with Major League Soccer club New York Red Bulls. The signing was confirmed by New York on 10 February 2012. Guðlagur did not command a regular starting place in the New York starting lineup during the 2012 season.

=== Later career ===
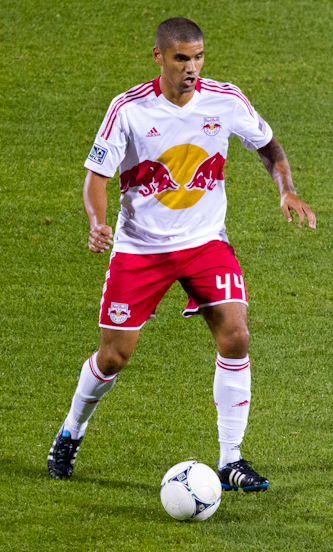
With the New York Red Bulls in July 2012

In August 2012, the club loaned Guðlaugur to Eredivisie club NEC until May 2013, including an option for permanent signing. On 31 December 2012, he was signed by NEC permanently on a free transfer. He signed a contract until the summer of 2016.

After the relegation of NEC, Guðlaugur left the club and signed a contract in August 2014 with Swedish side Helsingborgs IF. He made his league debut for the club on 10 August 2014 in a 0–0 home draw with Norrköping. He came on as a substitute for Arnór Smárason in the 75th minute.

Guðlaugur signed a four-year contract with Danish side Esbjerg fB on 31 August 2015. He made his league debut for the club on 14 September 2015 in a 4–2 home victory over Odense BK. He scored his first goal for the club in the 30th minute of this match.

In July 2017 he signed a three-year contract with Swiss side FC Zürich. He made his league debut for Zürich in a 2–1 home victory over Thun on 30 July 2017. He came on as a substitute for Sangoné Sarr in the 85th minute. He was captain of the 2017–18 Swiss Cup winning team.

On 9 January 2019, Guðlaugur Victor signed a three-and-a-half-year deal with 2. Bundesliga side SV Darmstadt 98.

On 25 May 2021, he agreed to join FC Schalke 04, newly relegated from Bundesliga, for the 2021–22 season, signing a two-year contract.

On 27 July 2022, he joined Major League Soccer club D.C. United on a contract until the end of 2024 with an option for a further year.

On 28 July 2023, Guðlaugur Victor returned to Europe when he joined Belgian Pro League club Eupen on a three-year deal, but the Pandas were relegated at the end of his first season there.

On 25 July 2024, Guðlaugur Victor signed for EFL Championship club Plymouth Argyle. He reunited with former D.C. United manager Wayne Rooney, who had recommended his signing despite not being responsible for transfers at the club. Affected by injury and lack of form, he played only eight games before Rooney's resignation on 31 December. He departed the club in August 2025 after having his contract terminated by mutual consent.

Following his departure from Plymouth Argyle, Guðlaugur Victor signed with Danish 1st Division club Horsens on 25 August 2025.

== International career ==
Guðlaugur has represented Iceland at Under-17, Under-19, Under-21, and full international levels. He helped Iceland qualify to the 2011 UEFA European Under-21 Football Championship. He scored his first goal for the senior team in a 4–1 win against Liechtenstein on 31 March 2021.

== Career statistics ==
=== Club ===
As of match played 16 August 2025

Appearances and goals by club, season and competition
Club	Season	League			National cup (Note: Includes FA Cup, Scottish Cup, US Open Cup, KNVB Cup, DFB-Pokal, Svenska Cupen, Danish Cup, Swiss Cup, Belgian Cup)		League cup (Note: Includes Scottish League Cup, EFL Cup)		Europe		Other		Total	
Club	Season	Division	Apps	Goals	Apps	Goals	Apps	Goals	Apps	Goals	Apps	Goals	Apps	Goals
Liverpool	2010–11	Premier League	0	0	0	0	—		0	0	—		0	0
Dagenham & Redbridge	2010–11	League One	2	0	1	0	—		—		—		3	0
Hibernian	2010–11	Scottish Premiership	16	1	—		—		—		—		16	1
Hibernian	2011–12	Scottish Premiership	15	0	0	0	3	0	—		—		18	0
Hibernian	Total		31	1	0	0	3	0	—		—		34	1
New York Red Bulls	2012	Major League Soccer	16	0	1	0	—		—		—		17	0
NEC Nijmegen	2012–13	Eredivisie	27	2	1	0	—		—		—		28	2
NEC Nijmegen	2013–14	Eredivisie	23	2	2	0	—		—		2 (Note: Appearances in Eredivisie play-offs)	0	27	2
NEC Nijmegen	Total		50	4	3	0	—		—		2	0	55	4
Helsingborgs IF	2014	Allsvenskan	12	2	4	1	—		—		—		16	3
Helsingborgs IF	2015	Allsvenskan	21	1	1	0	—		—		—		22	1
Helsingborgs IF	Total		33	3	5	1	—		—		—		38	4
Esbjerg fB	2015–16	Danish Superliga	5	1	1	0	—		—		—		6	1
Esbjerg fB	2016–17	Danish Superliga	30	2	2	0	—		—		3 (Note: Appearances in Danish Superliga relegation play-offs)	0	35	2
Esbjerg fB	Total		35	3	3	0	—		—		3	0	41	3
FC Zürich	2017–18	Swiss Super League	33	1	6	1	—		—		—		39	2
FC Zürich	2018–19	Swiss Super League	14	0	1	0	—		5	1	—		20	1
FC Zürich	Total		47	1	7	1	—		5	1	—		59	3
Darmstadt 98	2018–19	2. Bundesliga	15	0	—		—		—		—		15	0
Darmstadt 98	2019–20	2. Bundesliga	31	3	2	0	—		—		—		33	3
Darmstadt 98	2020–21	2. Bundesliga	21	3	2	0	—		—		—		23	3
Darmstadt 98	Total		67	6	4	0	—		—		—		71	6
Schalke 04	2021–22	2. Bundesliga	28	0	2	0	—		—		—		30	0
D.C. United	2022	Major League Soccer	10	0	—		—		—		—		10	0
D.C. United	2023	Major League Soccer	18	0	0	0	—		—		—		18	0
D.C. United	Total		28	0	—		—		—		—		28	0
Eupen	2023–24	Belgian Pro League	35	2	1	0	—		—		—		36	2
Plymouth Argyle	2024–25	Championship	25	0	2	0	0	0	—		—		27	0
Plymouth Argyle	2025–26	League One	3	0	0	0	1	0	—		0	0	4	0
Plymouth Argyle	Total		28	0	2	0	1	0	0	0	0	0	31	0
Career total			400	20	29	2	4	0	5	1	5	0	443	23

=== International ===
As of match played 16 November 2026

Appearances and goals by national team and year
National team	Year	Apps	Goals
Iceland	2014	1	0
Iceland	2015	3	0
Iceland	2016	0	0
Iceland	2017	2	0
Iceland	2018	5	0
Iceland	2019	4	0
Iceland	2020	8	0
Iceland	2021	6	1
Iceland	2022	2	0
Iceland	2023	11	0
Iceland	2024	5	1
Iceland	2025	9	3
Iceland	2026	8	1
Total		64	6

Scores and results list Iceland's goal tally first, score column indicates score after each Victor goal.

List of international goals scored by Victor Pálsson
No.	Date	Venue	Cap	Opponent	Score	Result	Competition
1	31 March 2021	Rheinpark Stadion, Vaduz, Liechtenstein	26	Liechtenstein	3–0	4–1	2022 FIFA World Cup qualification
2	9 September 2024	Gürsel Aksel Stadium, İzmir, Turkey	45	Turkey	1–1	1–3	2024–25 UEFA Nations League B
3	6 June 2025	Hampden Park, Glasgow, Scotland	49	Scotland	3–1	3–1	Friendly
4	5 September 2025	Laugardalsvöllur, Reykjavík, Iceland	51	Azerbaijan	1–0	5–0	2026 FIFA World Cup qualification
5	13 October 2025	Laugardalsvöllur, Reykjavík, Iceland	54	France	1–0	2–2	2026 FIFA World Cup qualification
6	29 September 2026	Stade de Luxembourg, Luxembourg City, Luxembourg	60	Luxembourg	3–0	3–0	2026–27 UEFA Nations League C

== Honours ==
FC Zürich

- Swiss Cup: 2017–18

Schalke 04

- 2. Bundesliga: 2021–22
