= Boston Rams =

Real Boston Rams
- Full name: Real Boston Rams Soccer Club
- Nickname: Rams
- Founded: 2012
- Dissolved: 2015
- Ground: Veterans Memorial Stadium; Quincy, Massachusetts
- Capacity: 1,000
- President: Mike Madden
- Head coach: Jim Costa
- League: Premier Development League
- 2015: 3rd, Northeast; Playoffs: DNQ
- Website: http://www.bostonrams.com/
Home colors	Away colors

The Real Boston Rams were an American amateur soccer club based in Quincy, Massachusetts. The Rams play in the USL Premier Development League, the fourth division of the American soccer pyramid. Founded in 2012, the club played until 2015.

== History ==
The club was granted a franchise into the PDL on December 17, 2012. The Rams announced in April 2013 that they were to become the affiliate club of New England Revolution, allowing the Revolution's college aged academy players to turn out for the Rams. The deal also meant that revolution coaching staff would assist in the development of Rams players. The club played its first ever game, a friendly against Newtown Soccer Club on May 5, 2013. A week later, on May 11, the Rams played their first ever league game, a 3–0 defeat to CFC Azul.

== Colors and badge ==
Real Boston Rams' colors were black and gold. The team's crest features a ram's head donning a crown, with the script "Boston 2012" above the ram's head. The official uniform colors were black and gold.

== Players and staff ==
=== Team management ===
Position	Staff
Head Coach	Jim Costa
Assistant Coach	Pete Mendel
Assistant Coach	Mike Agostinho

== Year-by-year ==
Year	Division	League	Regular season	Playoffs	Open Cup
2013	4	USL PDL	5th, Northeast	Did not qualify	Did not qualify
2014	4	USL PDL	5th, Northeast	Did not qualify	Did not qualify
2015	4	USL PDL	3rd, Northeast	Did not qualify	Did not qualify
