= Markus Holgersson =

Swedish footballer (born 1985)

Personal information
- Full name: Sven Markus Holgersson
- Date of birth: 16 April 1985 (age 41)
- Place of birth: Landskrona, Sweden
- Height: 1.93 m (6 ft 4 in)
- Position: Defender

Youth career
- 1990–1994: IF Lödde
- 1994–2001: Landskrona BoIS
- 2002–2004: Helsingborgs IF

Senior career*
Years	Team	Apps	(Gls)
2004	Höganäs BK		
2005–2008	Ängelholms FF	89	(13)
2009–2011	Helsingborgs IF	80	(5)
2012–2013	New York Red Bulls	63	(3)
2014	Wigan Athletic	1	(0)
2014	Helsingborgs IF	4	(0)
2014–2016	Anorthosis	59	(3)
2016–2017	AaB	26	(2)
2017–2018	Lorca	15	(0)
2018–2019	Helsingborgs IF	42	(2)
Total		379	(28)

International career
2012	Sweden	1	(0)
- * Club domestic league appearances and goals

Sven Markus Holgersson (born 16 April 1985) is a Swedish former professional footballer who played as a defender. He played professionally in Sweden, the United States, England, Cyprus, Denmark, and Spain before retiring in 2019. He won one cap for the Sweden national team.

== Club career ==
=== Sweden ===
Having spent his youth years at Olympia, he returned to Helsingborg after a four-year spell at Helsingborg's feeder club Ängelholms FF. Upon returning to Helsinborg, Holgersson became an instant starter at right back. During the 2011 season Holgersson helped the club in becoming the first team in Swedish history to win a treble, consisting of Super Cup, League and Swedish Cup titles. On 2 January 2012 Helsingborg confirmed that Holgersson had rejected to renew his contract with the club.

=== United States ===
Holgersson was rumoured to be in talks with New York Red Bulls of Major League Soccer and on 3 January 2012 Red Bulls coach Hans Backe indicated that the player had agreed to join the club. On 12 January 2012, it was confirmed that Holgersson would be joining the Red Bulls. In his first year with New York Holgersson was an undisputed starter at centerback starting 31 games and scoring 3 goals. The following season Holgersson retained his starting position starting in 32 league matches as New York captured its first major title the MLS Supporters' Shield. Holgersson and the club agreed to part ways following the season.

=== Wigan Athletic ===
Holgersson joined Wigan Athletic on 5 February 2014 after being a free agent.

He was released from his contract at the end of the season after making only one appearance. After leaving Wigan, Holgersson went on trial with Championship side Huddersfield Town on trial and his performance in the friendly match left him impressed by Manager Mark Robins.

=== Later career ===
After leaving Wigan, Holgersson returned to Sweden by rejoining Helsingborgs IF until the end of the 2014 season. On 28 August 2014 he signed a two-year contract with Anorthosis of Cyprus.

On 14 April 2016 it was confirmed that Holgersson had signed a pre-contract with Danish Superliga-club, AaB, starting from the summer 2016. His contract was terminated on 12 July 2017.

On 14 July 2017, Holgersson signed for Spanish Segunda División side Lorca FC.

On 8 August 2018, Holgersson returned to Helsingborgs IF, now competing in Superettan, Sweden's second tier.

== International career ==
After a successful 2011 season, Holgersson received his first call up to join Sweden for its friendly matches against Bahrain on 18 January 2012 and Qatar on 23 January 2012. He made his debut with Sweden on 23 January 2012 going the full 90 in a 5–0 victory over Qatar.
