= 2016 New York Red Bulls II season =

New York Red Bulls II
2016 season
- Sporting director: Ali Curtis
- Head coach: John Wolyniec
- USL: Overall: 1st, USL; Conference: 1st, Eastern
- USL Playoffs: USL Champions; Eastern Conference Champions
- Top goalscorer: League: Brandon Allen (15 goals); All: Brandon Allen (21 goals)
Home colors	Away colors

The 2016 New York Red Bulls II season was the club's second season of existence, and their second in the United Soccer League, the third-tier of the American soccer pyramid. The Red Bulls II played in the Eastern Division of USL.

== Club ==
=== Coaching staff ===
Position	Staff
Head Coach	(United States) John Wolyniec

=== Squad information ===
As of October 24, 2016

Appearances and goals are career totals from all-competitions.

Squad No.	Name	Nationality	Position(s)	Date of birth (age)	Signed from	Games played	Goals scored
Goalkeepers
18	Ryan Meara	(United States)	GK	November 15, 1990 (age 35)	New York Red Bulls (loan)	25	0
24	Kyle Reynish	(United States)	GK	November 3, 1983 (age 43)	New York Red Bulls (loan)	8	0
74	Rafael Diaz	(Dominican Republic)	GK	October 8, 1991 (age 35)	(United States) St. John's University	10	0
Defenders
3	Gideon Baah	(Ghana)	CB/LB	October 1, 1991 (age 35)	New York Red Bulls (loan)	4	0
17	Zach Carroll	(United States)	CB	March 16, 1994 (age 32)	(United States) New York Red Bulls	29	0
20	Justin Bilyeu	(United States)	LB	February 3, 1994 (age 32)	New York Red Bulls (loan)	15	1
33	Aaron Long	(United States)	RB	October 12, 1992 (age 34)	(United States) Seattle Sounders FC 2	26	4
34	Mason Deeds	(United States)	RB	August 3, 1998 (age 28)	Academy	4	0
39	Tim Schmoll	(Switzerland)	CB	February 22, 1993 (age 33)	(United States) Harvard University	27	1
41	Konrad Plewa	(Poland)	CB	February 27, 1992 (age 34)	(United States) Seton Hall University	52	3
46	Kevin O'Toole	(United States)	LB	December 14, 1998 (age 27)	Academy	15	1
66	Noah Powder	(Trinidad and Tobago)	LB	October 27, 1998 (age 28)	Academy	20	2
Midfielders
4	Tyler Adams	(United States)	CM	February 14, 1999 (age 27)	New York Red Bulls (loan)	33	0
7	Derrick Etienne	(Haiti)	CM	November 25, 1996 (age 29)	New York Red Bulls (loan)	42	10
27	Sean Davis	(United States)	CM	February 8, 1993 (age 33)	New York Red Bulls (loan)	11	1
36	Dan Metzger	(United States)	CM	August 6, 1993 (age 33)	Academy	43	3
37	David Najem	(United States)	CM	May 26, 1992 (age 34)	(Germany) FC Eintracht Bamberg	19	0
45	Zoumana Simpara	(Mali)	CM	February 2, 1998 (age 28)	(Mali) AS Bakaridjan	22	2
47	Florian Valot	(France)	CM	February 13, 1993 (age 33)	(United States) Rider University	21	3
80	Devon Williams	(Jamaica)	CM	April 8, 1992 (age 34)	(United States) Pittsburgh Riverhounds U23	39	2
88	Vincent Bezecourt	(France)	CM	June 10, 1993 (age 33)	(United States) St. Francis College	22	8
Forwards
19	Alex Muyl	(United States)	FW	September 30, 1995 (age 31)	New York Red Bulls (loan)	5	1
21	Brandon Allen	(United States)	FW	October 8, 1993 (age 33)	New York Red Bulls (loan)	32	21
29	Stefano Bonomo	(United States)	FW	January 25, 1993 (age 33)	(United States) University of California	37	8
44	Brian Saramago	(United States)	FW	November 9, 1998 (age 28)	Academy	7	0
77	Junior Flemmings	(Jamaica)	FW	January 16, 1996 (age 30)	(Jamaica) Tivoli Gardens F.C.	23	7

== Competitions ==
=== USL ===
==== Eastern Conference standings ====
Pos	Team	Pld	W	D	L	GF	GA	GD	Pts	Qualification
1	New York Red Bulls II (C, X)	30	21	6	3	61	21	+40	69	Conference Playoffs
2	Louisville City FC	30	17	9	4	52	27	+25	60	Conference Playoffs
3	FC Cincinnati	30	16	8	6	41	27	+14	56	Conference Playoffs
4	Rochester Rhinos	30	13	12	5	38	25	+13	51	Conference Playoffs
5	Charlotte Independence	30	14	8	8	48	29	+19	50	Conference Playoffs

Source: 2016 USL Standings
Rules for classification: 1) total wins; 2) total goal differential; 3) total goals scored; 4) points earned against top four Conference finishers; 5) disciplinary points; 6) coin toss or drawing of lots
(C) Champions; (X) Regular Season League Champion

==== Results ====
March 26 1	New York Red Bulls II	2–2	Toronto FC II	Harrison
3:00 p.m. EST	Allen 66' (pen.), 70'	USL Report; NYRB Report	Edwards 35'; Thomas 45'	Stadium: Red Bull Arena; Attendance: 374

April 2 2	Louisville City FC	0–2	New York Red Bulls II	Louisville
3:00 p.m. EST		USL Report; NYRB Report	Flemmings 29'; Allen 78'	Stadium: Louisville Slugger Field; Attendance: 7,522

April 10 3	New York Red Bulls II	4–0	Bethlehem Steel FC	Harrison
7:30 p.m. EST	Yaro 1' (o.g.); Muyl 4'; Abang 41'; Etienne 71'	USL Report		Stadium: Red Bull Arena

April 17 4	New York Red Bulls II	0–0	Rochester Rhinos	Harrison
4:00 p.m. EST		USL Report		Stadium: Red Bull Arena

April 22 5	Wilmington Hammerheads FC	0–1	New York Red Bulls II	Wilmington
7:00 p.m. EST		USL Report	Metzger 59'	Stadium: Legion Stadium

May 1 6	New York Red Bulls II	0–2	Charlotte Independence	Harrison
4:00 PMEST		USL Report	Martínez 13'; Slogic 34'	Stadium: Red Bull Arena; Attendance: 134

May 7 7	Pittsburgh Riverhounds	1–3	New York Red Bulls II	Pittsburgh
7:00 p.m. EST	Parkes 10' (red card) 87'	Report	Abang 12'; Bonomo 72'; Etienne 83'; Ouimette (red card) 87'	Stadium: Highmark Stadium; Attendance: 2,370

May 14 8	New York Red Bulls II	1–1	Richmond Kickers	Harrison
4:00 p.m. EST	Abang 63'	Report	Ownby 90'	Stadium: Red Bull Arena; Attendance: 168

May 21 9	FC Montreal	0–1	New York Red Bulls II	Montreal
3:00 p.m. EST		Report	Flemmings 90'	Stadium: Complexe sportif Claude-Robillard

May 28 10	New York Red Bulls II	1–0	Pittsburgh Riverhounds	Harrison
10:00 p.m. EST	Flemmings 8'	Report		Stadium: Red Bull Arena

June 5 11	Bethlehem Steel FC	0–1	New York Red Bulls II	Bethlehem
4:00 p.m. EST		Report	Allen 3'	Stadium: Goodman Stadium; Attendance: 3,569

June 9 12	New York Red Bulls II	1–0	Harrisburg City Islanders	Harrison
7:00 p.m. EST	Davis 7'			Stadium: Red Bull Arena

June 19 13	Orlando City B	2–2	New York Red Bulls II	Melbourne
7:30 p.m. EST	García 17' da Silva 87'	Report	Schmoll 38'; Long 41'	Stadium: Titan Soccer Complex; Attendance: 1,009

June 26 14	New York Red Bulls II	4–0	Wilmington Hammerheads FC	Harrison
5:00 p.m. EST	Allen 20'; Long 77'; Bonomo 85' (pen.); Junior Flemmings 87'			Stadium: Red Bull Arena; Attendance: 453

July 2 15	New York Red Bulls II	0–0	Rochester Rhinos	Harrison
7:00 p.m. EST		Report		Stadium: Red Bull Arena; Attendance: 417

July 9 16	FC Montreal	2–4	New York Red Bulls II	Montreal
3:00 p.m. EST	Tabla 41'; Charbonneau 84'	Report	Allen 18' (pen.), 24', 70'; Flemmings 47'	Stadium: Complexe sportif Claude-Robillard

July 16 17	Charlotte Independence	1–2	New York Red Bulls II	Charlotte
7:00 p.m. EST	Davidson 49'	Report	Bonomo 15'; Metzger 64'	Stadium: Ramblewood Soccer Complex; Attendance: 1,288

July 20 18	FC Cincinnati	1–2	New York Red Bulls II	Cincinnati
7:00 p.m. EST	McLaughlin 60'	Report	Bilyeu 83'; Valot 86'	Stadium: Nippert Stadium; Attendance: 16,127

July 23 19	New York Red Bulls II	2–3	Charleston Battery	Hanover
4:00 p.m. EST	Bonomo 55'; O'Toole 61'	Report	Chang 9'; Williams 29'; Cordovés 66'	Stadium: Red Bull Training Facility

July 30 20	Richmond Kickers	2–1	New York Red Bulls II	Richmond
7:00 p.m. EST	Imura 11'; Eskay 90'	Report	Allen 10'	Stadium: City Stadium; Attendance: 3,113

August 2 21	Harrisburg City Islanders	0–5	New York Red Bulls II	Harrisburg
7:00 p.m. EST		Report	Abang 27'; Metzger 65'; Simpara 76'; Bezecourt 78', 86'	Stadium: FNB Field; Attendance: 1,837

August 12 22	New York Red Bulls II	5–1	Orlando City B	Harrison
7:00 p.m. EST	8' (o.g.); Allen 61' (pen.); Williams 66'; Flemmings 86'; Simpara 90'	Report	Cox 68'	Stadium: Red Bull Arena; Attendance: 478

August 19 23	New York Red Bulls II	1–0	Louisville City FC	Harrison
7:00 p.m. EST	Allen 74' (pen.)	Report		Stadium: Red Bull Arena

August 24 24	Toronto FC II	0–1	New York Red Bulls II	Vaughan
5:00 p.m. EST		Report	Flemmings 64'	Stadium: Ontario Soccer Centre; Attendance: 1,081

August 28 25	New York Red Bulls II	2–0	FC Cincinnati	Harrison
5:30 p.m. EST	Allen 15' (pen.); Etienne 90' (pen.)	Report		Stadium: Red Bull Arena

September 4 26	Bethlehem Steel FC	0–2	New York Red Bulls II	Bethlehem
3:00 p.m. EST		Report	Allen 31' (pen.); Etienne 90'	Stadium: Goodman Stadium

September 7 27	Harrisburg City Islanders	1–4	New York Red Bulls II	Millersville
4:00 p.m. EST	Benbow 46'	Report	Bezecourt 23', 73'; Powder 67', 79'	Stadium: Millersville University

September 10 28	Rochester Rhinos	1–1	New York Red Bulls II	Rochester
TBD	Samuels 57'	Report	Bezecourt 88'	Stadium: Sahlen's Stadium; Attendance: 3,505

September 17 29	New York Red Bulls II	4–0	FC Montreal	Harrison
7:00 p.m. EST	Allen 19'; Valot 53'; Etienne 73'; Bonomo 90'	Report		Stadium: Red Bull Arena; Attendance: 1,517

September 24 30	Charleston Battery	1–2	New York Red Bulls II	Charleston
7:30 p.m. EST	Marini 50'	Report	Bezecourt 38'; Allen 75'	Stadium: MUSC Health Stadium; Attendance: 5,534

=== USL Playoffs ===
October 2 Conference Quarterfinal	New York Red Bulls II	4–0	Orlando City B	Harrison, New Jersey
5:00 p.m. EST	Long 32', 77'; Bezecourt 59'; Allen 67'	Report		Stadium: Red Bull Arena; Attendance: 1,088

October 7 Conference Semifinal	New York Red Bulls II	3–3 (a.e.t.) (5–4 p)	Rochester Rhinos	Harrison, New Jersey
7:00 pm	Etienne 20'; Allen 44', 119' (pen.)	Report	Dos Santos 22', 55'	Stadium: Red Bull Arena
	Penalties
	Long (penalty scored); Etienne (penalty scored); Allen (penalty scored); Metzger (penalty scored); Plewa (penalty scored)		(penalty scored) Fall; (penalty scored) Farrell; (penalty missed) Dos Santos; (penalty scored) Kyriazis

October 16 Conference Final	New York Red Bulls II	1–1 (a.e.t.) (4–3 p)	Louisville City FC	Harrison, New Jersey
6:00 PM	Valot 74'; Williams (red card) 118'	USL Report	Craig 11' (yellow card) 102' (red card) 120+'; Reynolds (red card) 104'	Stadium: Red Bull Arena; Attendance: 2,709; Referee: Robert Sibiga
	Penalties
	Etienne (penalty scored); Long (penalty scored); Allen (penalty scored); Bezecourt (penalty scored)		(penalty missed) Lancaster; (penalty scored) Smith; (penalty scored) Quinn; (penalty scored) Kaye; (penalty missed) Newnam

October 23 USL Championship	New York Red Bulls II	5–1	Swope Park Rangers	Harrison, New Jersey
8:00 PM	Etienne 18'; Allen 39', 85', 88'; Metzger (yellow card) 72'; Bezecourt 90+2'	USL Report	Granitto 74'	Stadium: Red Bull Arena; Attendance: 5,547; Referee: Armando Villarreal

== Player statistics ==
=== Top scorers ===
Place	Position	Number	Name	USL	USL Cup	Total
1	FW	21	(United States) Brandon Allen	15	6	21
2	MF	88	(France) Vincent Bezecourt	6	2	8
3	FW	77	(Jamaica) Junior Flemmings	7	0	7
3	MF	7	(Haiti) Derrick Etienne	5	2	7
5	FW	29	(United States) Stefano Bonomo	5	0	5
6	FW	9	(Cameroon) Anatole Abang	4	0	4
6	DF	33	(United States) Aaron Long	2	2	4
8	MF	36	(United States) Dan Metzger	3	0	3
8	MF	47	(France) Florian Valot	2	1	3
10	DF	66	(Trinidad and Tobago) Noah Powder	2	0	2
10	MF	45	(Mali) Zoumana Simpara	2	0	2
Total				53	13	66

As of 24 October 2016.

=== Assist Leaders ===
Place	Position	Number	Name	USL	USL Cup	Total
1	MF	47	(France) Florian Valot	6	2	8
2	MF	7	(Haiti) Derrick Etienne	6	1	7
2	MF	88	(France) Vincent Bezecourt	2	4	6
4	FW	77	(Jamaica) Junior Flemmings	5	0	5
4	FW	21	(United States) Brandon Allen	4	1	5
6	MF	36	(United States) Dan Metzger	3	0	3
6	FW	29	(United States) Stefano Bonomo	2	1	3
8	DF	20	(United States) Justin Bilyeu	2	0	2
9	DF	3	(Ghana) Gideon Baah	1	0	1
9	MF	27	(United States) Sean Davis	1	0	1
9	DF	37	(Switzerland) Tim Schmoll	1	0	1
9	DF	41	(Poland) Konrad Plewa	1	0	1
Total				34	9	43

As of 24 October 2016.
This table does not include secondary assists.

=== Clean sheets ===
Place	Position	Number	Name	USL	USL Cup	Total
1	GK	18	(United States) Ryan Meara	10	1	11
2	GK	74	(Dominican Republic) Rafael Diaz	4	0	4
3	GK	24	(United States) Kyle Reynish	2	0	2
Total				16	1	17

As of 24 October 2016.
