= 2017 New York Red Bulls II season =

New York Red Bulls II
2017 season
- Head coach: John Wolyniec
- USL: 7th, Eastern Conference
- USL Playoffs: Conf. Finalist
- Top goalscorer: Stefano Bonomo (10 goals)
- Highest home attendance: 1,482 (9/30 vs. PIT)
- Lowest home attendance: 271 (5/6 vs. HAR)
- Average home league attendance: 632
- Biggest win: NY 4–0 CIN (8/19); CLT 0–4 NY (10/21)
- Biggest defeat: CLT 5–1 NY (5/11)
Home colors	Away colors

The 2017 New York Red Bulls II season was the club's third season of existence, and their third in United Soccer League, the second-tier of the American soccer pyramid. The Red Bulls II played in the Eastern Division of USL.

== Club ==
=== Coaching staff ===
Position	Staff
Head Coach	(United States) John Wolyniec

=== Squad information ===
As of November 4, 2017

Appearances and goals are career totals from all-competitions.

Squad No.	Name	Nationality	Position(s)	Date of birth (age)	Signed from	Games played	Goals scored
Goalkeepers
18	Ryan Meara	(United States)	GK	November 15, 1990 (age 35)	(United States) New York Red Bulls (loan)	28	0
24	Evan Louro	(United States)	GK	January 19, 1996 (age 30)	(United States) New York Red Bulls (loan)	21	0
40	Rafael Diaz	(Dominican Republic)	GK	October 8, 1991 (age 35)	(United States) St. John's University	22	0
Defenders
3	Gideon Baah	(Ghana)	CB/LB	October 1, 1991 (age 35)	New York Red Bulls (loan)	6	0
28	Fidel Escobar	(Panama)	RB	January 9, 1995 (age 31)	(Panama) Sporting San Miguelito (loan)	1	0
35	Jordan Scarlett	(Jamaica)	CB	July 8, 1995 (age 31)	(United States) Iona College	18	0
39	Tim Schmoll	(Switzerland)	CB	February 22, 1993 (age 33)	(United States) Harvard University	50	1
44	Andrew Lombard	(United States)	RB	July 20, 1997 (age 29)	Academy	1	0
46	Kevin O'Toole	(United States)	LB	December 14, 1998 (age 27)	Academy	25	1
47	Hassan Ndam	(Cameroon)	CB	October 29, 1998 (age 28)	(United States) New York Red Bulls (loan)	26	1
50	David Abidor	(United States)	CB	October 1, 1992 (age 34)	(United States) Tulsa Roughnecks	20	1
54	Jordan Bailon	(United States)	CB	March 24, 2000 (age 26)	Academy	2	0
62	Michael Amir Murillo	(Panama)	RB	February 11, 1996 (age 30)	(United States) New York Red Bulls (loan)	2	0
66	Noah Powder	(Trinidad and Tobago)	LB	October 27, 1998 (age 28)	Academy	30	3
92	Ethan Kutler	(United States)	RB	May 1, 1995 (age 31)	(United States) Colgate University	18	1
Midfielders
6	Dan Metzger	(United States)	CM	August 6, 1993 (age 33)	(United States) New York Red Bulls (loan)	65	3
7	Derrick Etienne	(Haiti)	CM	November 25, 1996 (age 29)	New York Red Bulls (loan)	50	11
12	Zeiko Lewis	(Bermuda)	CM	June 4, 1995 (age 31)	(United States) Boston College	23	2
17	Arun Basuljevic	(United States)	CM	December 17, 1995 (age 30)	(United States) New York Red Bulls (loan)	26	2
22	Florian Valot	(France)	CM	February 13, 1993 (age 33)	(United States) Rider University	52	13
25	Dilly Duka	(United States)	CM	September 15, 1989 (age 37)	(United States) New York Red Bulls (loan)	3	0
36	Andrew Tinari	(United States)	CM	September 12, 1995 (age 31)	(United States) Jersey Express	26	2
37	David Najem	(United States)	CM	May 26, 1992 (age 34)	(Germany) FC Eintracht Bamberg	50	1
52	Ben Mines	(United States)	CM	May 12, 2000 (age 26)	Academy	16	2
53	Kazu Shigenobu	(United States)	CM	August 20, 1999 (age 27)	Academy	11	0
80	Zaire Bartley	(Jamaica)	CM	March 5, 1999 (age 27)	Academy	3	0
88	Vincent Bezecourt	(France)	CM	June 10, 1993 (age 33)	(United States) St. Francis College	45	14
Forwards
19	Alex Muyl	(United States)	FW	September 30, 1995 (age 31)	(United States) New York Red Bulls (loan)	6	1
21	Brandon Allen	(United States)	FW	October 8, 1993 (age 33)	(United States) New York Red Bulls (loan)	46	30
29	Stefano Bonomo	(United States)	FW	January 25, 1993 (age 33)	(United States) University of California	53	21
70	Junior Flemmings	(Jamaica)	FW	January 16, 1996 (age 30)	(Jamaica) Tivoli Gardens F.C.	54	17
91	Douglas Martinez	(Honduras)	FW	June 5, 1997 (age 29)	(Honduras) CD Vida (loan)	15	1

== Competitions ==
=== Exhibition ===
August 15	New York Red Bulls II	4–0	Boston College Eagles	Whippany
11:00 a.m. EST	Duka (?); Bonomo,,	Report		Stadium: Red Bulls Training Facility

=== USL ===
==== Eastern Conference standings ====
Pos	Team	Pld	W	D	L	GF	GA	GD	Pts	Qualification
5	Charlotte Independence	32	13	9	10	52	40	+12	48	Conference Playoffs
6	FC Cincinnati	32	12	10	10	46	48	−2	46	Conference Playoffs
7	New York Red Bulls II	32	13	5	14	57	60	−3	44	Conference Playoffs
8	Bethlehem Steel FC	32	12	8	12	46	45	+1	44	Conference Playoffs
9	Orlando City B	32	10	12	10	37	36	+1	42	

Source: 2017 USL standings
Rules for classification: 1) total wins; 2) total goal differential; 3) total goals scored; 4) points earned against top four Conference finishers; 5) disciplinary points; 6) coin toss or drawing of lots

==== Results ====
March 25 1	Pittsburgh Riverhounds	3–3	New York Red Bulls II	Pittsburgh
5:00 p.m. EST	Hertzog 9', 81'; Kerr 39'	Report	Valot 6'; Bezecourt 16', 76' (pen.)	Stadium: Highmark Stadium; Attendance: 3,352; Referee: Charles Murphy

April 1 2	New York Red Bulls II	1–0	Richmond Kickers	Montclair
4:00 p.m. EST	Lewis 69'	Report		Stadium: MSU Soccer Park; Attendance: 806; Referee: Henrik Karlsson

April 5 3	New York Red Bulls II	0–1	Harrisburg City Islanders	Harrison
7:00 p.m. EST		Report	Sanchez 62'	Stadium: Red Bull Arena; Attendance: 396; Referee: Alex Chilowicz

April 8 4	Saint Louis FC	3–2	New York Red Bulls II	Fenton
8:30 p.m. EST	Volesky 3'; Angulo 74' (pen.); Rudolph 84'	Report	Bezecourt 52'; Allen 58'	Stadium: World Wide Technology Soccer Park; Attendance: 4,807; Referee: Greg Dopka

April 14 5	New York Red Bulls II	3–1	Orlando City B	Montclair
7:00 p.m. EST	Flemmings 16'; Bezecourt 45+3'; Abidor 87'	Report	Dikwa 34'	Stadium: MSU Soccer Park; Attendance: 722; Referee: Lorant Varga

April 22 6	Rochester Rhinos	2–2	New York Red Bulls II	Rochester
6:05PM EST	Garzi 45+1'; Farrell 90+4'	Report	Allen 50'; Bezecourt 65'	Stadium: Sahlen's Stadium; Attendance: 3,459; Referee: Geoff Gamble

May 6 7	New York Red Bulls II	3–1	Harrisburg City Islanders	Montclair
4:00 p.m. EST	Allen 26' (pen.), 57' (pen.); Martinez 79'	Report	Wheeler 39'	Stadium: MSU Soccer Park; Attendance: 271; Referee: Henrik Karlsson

May 11 8	Charlotte Independence	5–1	New York Red Bulls II	Charlotte
7:00 p.m. EST	Herrera 39'; Ross 43'; Martínez 51'; Estrada 82'; Siaj 90+2'	Report	Flemmings 21'	Stadium: Ramblewood Soccer Complex; Attendance: 801; Referee: Danielle Chesky

May 14 9	New York Red Bulls II	1–2	LA Galaxy II	Harrison
9:00 p.m. EST	Allen 3'	Report	Amnaya 49' (pen.); Dhillon 72'	Stadium: Red Bull Arena; Attendance: 673; Referee: Juan Guzman Jr.

May 20 10	New York Red Bulls II	3–4	Ottawa Fury	Montclair
4:00 p.m. EST	Flemmings 20'; Allen 56' (pen.); Mines 69'	Report	Hume 14'; Seoane 51'; Salazar 87'; Williams 90' (pen.)	Stadium: MSU Soccer Park; Attendance: 592; Referee: Elvis Osmanovic

May 28 11	New York Red Bulls II	2–1	Charleston Battery	Montclair
2:00 p.m. EST	Flemmings 54'; Etienne 75'	Report	Portillo 45'	Stadium: MSU Soccer Park; Attendance: 505; Referee: Bardhyl Pashaj

June 3 12	Richmond Kickers	0–1	New York Red Bulls II	Richmond
7:00 p.m. EST		Report	Allen 38'	Stadium: City Stadium; Attendance: 6,267; Referee: Calin Radosav

June 11 13	New York Red Bulls II	0–3	Louisville City	Montclair
4:00 p.m. EST		Report	Smith 25'; Ownby 55'; Ballard 90+3'	Stadium: MSU Soccer Park; Attendance: 581; Referee: Guido Gonzalez Jr.

June 16 14	New York Red Bulls II	0–2	Bethlehem Steel	Montclair
7:00 p.m. EST		Report	Najem 5'; Moar 57'	Stadium: MSU Soccer Park; Attendance: 495; Referee: Luis Arroyo

June 24 15	Ottawa Fury	2–2	New York Red Bulls II	Ottawa
2:00 p.m. EST	Williams 10'; Dixon 90+4'	Report	Lewis 61'; Allen 62'	Stadium: TD Place Stadium; Attendance: 7,780; Referee: Alain Ruch

July 1 16	New York Red Bulls II	1–0	Saint Louis FC	Montclair
4:00 p.m. EST	Allen 26'	Report		Stadium: MSU Soccer Park; Attendance: 611; Referee: Jorge Ramírez

July 9 17	Bethlehem Steel	2–0	New York Red Bulls II	Bethlehem
5:00 p.m. EST	Nanco 26'; Herbers 31'	Report		Stadium: Goodman Stadium; Attendance: 3,215; Referee: Gustavo Solorio

July 12 18	Harrisburg City Islanders	2–0	New York Red Bulls II	Harrisburg
7:00 p.m. EST	Thomas 20'; Wilson 41'	Report		Stadium: FNB Field; Attendance: 1,840; Referee: Jarosław Werel

July 15 19	New York Red Bulls II	2–3	Charlotte Independence	Montclair
4:00 p.m. EST	Najem 82'; Flemmings 85'	Report	Herrera 21'; Ndam 45+1' (o.g.); Martinez 53'	Stadium: MSU Soccer Park; Attendance: 505; Referee: Rubiel Vazquez

July 21 20	New York Red Bulls II	1–0	Toronto FC II	Montclair
7:00 p.m. EST	Bezecourt 27'	Report		Stadium: MSU Soccer Park; Attendance: 600; Referee: Lorant Varga

July 29 21	Louisville City	2–1	New York Red Bulls II	Louisville
7:30 p.m. EST	Craig 39'; Spencer 70'	Report	Bonomo 58'	Stadium: Louisville Slugger Field; Attendance: 10,017; Referee: Lukasz Szpala

August 5 22	New York Red Bulls II	2–1	Rochester Rhinos	Montclair
4:00 p.m. EST	Basuljevic 5'; Bonomo 55'	Report	Fall 70' (pen.)	Stadium: MSU Soccer Park; Attendance: 582; Referee: Charles Murphy

August 12 22	Charleston Battery	1–1	New York Red Bulls II	Charleston
7:00 p.m. EST	Williams 45'	Report	Bonomo 72'	Stadium: MUSC Health Stadium; Attendance: 3,233; Referee: Christopher Spivey

August 19 24	New York Red Bulls II	4–0	FC Cincinnati	Montclair
4:00 p.m. EST	Bonomo 23' (pen.); Ndam 42'; Flemmings 73', 74'	Report		Stadium: MSU Soccer Park; Attendance: 730; Referee: Kevin Broadley

August 27 25	Ottawa Fury	2–2	New York Red Bulls II	Ottawa
7:00 p.m. EST	Dos Santos 21'; Del Campo 94'	Report	Valot 32'; Tinari 79'	Stadium: TD Place Stadium; Attendance: 6,694; Referee: Juan Márquez

September 2 26	New York Red Bulls II	4–2	Tampa Bay Rowdies	Montclair
4:00 p.m. EST	Tinari 17'; Powder 41'; Valot 54'; Flemmings 83'	Report	Paterson 20'; Gorskie 77'	Stadium: MSU Soccer Park; Attendance: 562; Referee: José Carlos Rivero

September 9 27	Toronto FC II	1–2	New York Red Bulls II	Toronto
8:00 p.m. EST	Chapman 35'	Report	Bonomo 43', 45+2'	Stadium: BMO Field; Attendance: 3,582; Referee: Pierre-Luc Lauziere

September 16 28	FC Cincinnati	4–2	New York Red Bulls II	Cincinnati
7:00 p.m. EST	Berry 5'; Bone 32'; Delbridge 67'; Walker 72'	Report	Valot 18', 80'	Stadium: Nippert Stadium; Attendance: 30,417; Referee: Rosendo Mendoza

September 30 29	New York Red Bulls II	2–0	Pittsburgh Riverhounds	Montclair
4:00 p.m. EST	Obinwa 25' (o.g.); Valot 90+4'	Report		Stadium: MSU Soccer Park; Attendance: 1,482; Referee: Jonathan Bilinski

October 4 30	Tampa Bay Rowdies	3–2	New York Red Bulls II	St. Petersburg
7:30 p.m. EST	Cole 18'; Schäfer 25', 45'	Report	Bonomo 16'; Flemmings 54'	Stadium: Al Lang Stadium; Referee: Jonathan Weiner

October 7 31	Orlando City B	5–6	New York Red Bulls II	Orlando
7:30 p.m. EST	Neal 16'; Carroll 67'; Timbó 77'; Barry 90+1' (pen.); Martz 90+2'	Report	Bonomo 3', 41', 51'; Valot 12', 87' (pen.); Basuljevic 55'	Stadium: Orlando City Stadium

October 14 32	Rochester Rhinos	2–1	New York Red Bulls II	Rochester
6:05PM EST	Graf 35'; Forbes 68'	Report	Valot 37'	Stadium: Capelli Sport Stadium; Attendance: 1,402; Referee: Ismir Pekmic

=== USL Playoffs ===
October 21 Conference Quarterfinal	Charleston Battery	0–4	New York Red Bulls II	Charleston
7:00 p.m. EDT		Report	Bonomo 39'; Kutler 51'; Valot 71'; Mines 84'	Stadium: MUSC Health Stadium; Attendance: 3,410; Referee: Kevin Broadley

October 28 Conference Semifinal	Tampa Bay Rowdies	1–2 (a.e.t.)	New York Red Bulls II	St. Petersburg
7:30 p.m. EDT	Hristov 26'	Report	Bonomo 58' (pen.), 93'	Stadium: Al Lang Stadium; Attendance: 5,119; Referee: Joseph Dickerson

November 4 Conference Final	Louisville City FC	1–1 (a.e.t.) (4–3 p)	New York Red Bulls II	Louisville
7:30 p.m. EDT	Ownby 12'; Craig (yellow card) 96'	Report	Flemmings 57'	Stadium: Louisville Slugger Field; Attendance: 10,047; Referee: Sorin Stoica
	Penalties
	Smith (penalty scored); DelPiccolo (penalty missed); Totsch (penalty scored); Jimenes (penalty scored); Ballard (penalty scored)		Bonomo (penalty scored); Martinez (penalty scored); Valot (penalty scored); Mines (penalty missed); Kutler (penalty missed)

== Player statistics ==
=== Top appearances ===
As of 4 November 2017.

No.	Pos	Nat	Player	Total		USL		USL Cup	
No.	Pos	Nat	Player	Apps	Goals	Apps	Goals	Apps	Goals
Goalkeepers
18	GK	(United States) USA	Ryan Meara	3	-4	3	-4	0	0
24	GK	(United States) USA	Evan Louro	21	-41	18	-39	3	-2
31	GK	(Dominican Republic) DOM	Rafael Díaz	11	-17	11	-17	0	0
Defenders
3	DF	(Ghana) GHA	Gideon Baah	2	0	1+1	0	0	0
28	DF	(Panama) PAN	Fidel Escobar	1	0	1	0	0	0
35	DF	(Jamaica) JAM	Jordan Scarlett	19	0	14+2	0	3	0
39	DF	(Switzerland) SUI	Tim Schmoll	24	0	9+12	0	0+3	0
44	DF	(United States) USA	Andrew Lombard	1	0	1	0	0	0
46	DF	(United States) USA	Kevin O'Toole	10	0	7+3	0	0	0
47	DF	(Cameroon) CMR	Hassan Ndam	27	1	24	1	3	0
50	DF	(United States) USA	David Abidor	20	1	12+7	1	0+1	0
54	DF	(United States) USA	Jordan Bailon	0	0	0	0	0	0
62	DF	(Panama) PAN	Michael Amir Murillo	2	0	2	0	0	0
66	DF	(Trinidad and Tobago) TTO	Noah Powder	10	1	10	1	0	0
92	DF	(United States) USA	Ethan Kutler	18	1	12+3	0	3	1
Midfielders
6	MF	(United States) USA	Dan Metzger	22	0	19	0	3	0
7	MF	(Haiti) HAI	Derrick Etienne	8	1	8	1	0	0
12	MF	(Bermuda) BER	Zeiko Lewis	23	2	14+8	2	0+1	0
17	MF	(United States) USA	Arun Basuljevic	27	2	22+2	2	3	0
19	MF	(United States) USA	Alex Muyl	1	0	1	0	0	0
22	MF	(France) FRA	Florian Valot	32	10	25+4	9	3	1
25	MF	(United States) USA	Dilly Duka	3	0	2+1	0	0	0
36	MF	(United States) USA	Andrew Tinari	26	2	18+5	2	3	0
37	MF	(United States) USA	David Najem	33	1	28+2	1	3	0
52	MF	(United States) USA	Ben Mines	11	2	0+8	1	0+3	1
53	MF	(United States) USA	Kazu Shigenobu	10	0	5+5	0	0	0
80	MF	(Jamaica) JAM	Zaire Bartley	3	0	0+3	0	0	0
88	MF	(France) FRA	Vincent Bezecourt	24	6	23+1	6	0	0
Forwards
29	FW	(United States) USA	Stefano Bonomo	16	13	12+1	10	3	3
70	FW	(Jamaica) JAM	Junior Flemmings	32	10	19+10	9	3	1
91	FW	(Honduras) HON	Douglas Martínez	16	1	4+11	1	0+1	0
Left Club During Season
20	DF	(United States) USA	Justin Bilyeu	25	1	24+1	1	0	0
21	FW	(United States) USA	Brandon Allen	15	9	14+1	9	0	0

- Updated to matches played on October 7, 2017.

=== Top scorers ===
Place	Position	Number	Name	USL	USL Cup	Total
1	FW	29	(United States) Stefano Bonomo	10	3	13
2	MF	22	(France) Florian Valot	9	1	10
2	FW	70	(Jamaica) Junior Flemmings	9	1	10
3	FW	21	(United States) Brandon Allen	9	0	9
5	MF	88	(France) Vincent Bezecourt	6	0	6
6	MF	12	(Bermuda) Zeiko Lewis	2	0	2
6	MF	17	(United States) Arun Basuljevic	2	0	2
6	MF	36	(United States) Andrew Tinari	2	0	2
6	MF	52	(United States) Ben Mines	1	1	2
10	MF	7	(Haiti) Derrick Etienne	1	0	1
10	DF	20	(United States) Justin Bilyeu	1	0	1
10	MF	37	(United States) David Najem	1	0	1
10	DF	47	(Cameroon) Hassan Ndam	1	0	1
10	DF	50	(United States) David Abidor	1	0	1
10	DF	66	(Trinidad and Tobago) Noah Powder	1	0	1
10	FW	91	(Honduras) Douglas Martínez	1	0	1
10	DF	92	(United States) Ethan Kutler	0	1	1
Total				57	7	64

- Updated to matches played on November 4, 2017.

=== Assist Leaders ===
Place	Position	Number	Name	USL	USL Cup	Total
1	MF	88	(France) Vincent Bezecourt	11	0	11
2	DF	20	(United States) Justin Bilyeu	8	0	8
3	MF	22	(France) Florian Valot	6	1	7
4	FW	70	(Jamaica) Junior Flemmings	4	1	5
5	MF	17	(United States) Arun Basuljevic	2	1	3
5	MF	36	(United States) Andrew Tinari	2	1	3
7	FW	21	(United States) Brandon Allen	2	0	2
7	FW	29	(United States) Stefano Bonomo	1	1	2
8	MF	6	(United States) Dan Metzger	1	0	1
8	MF	12	(Bermuda) Zeiko Lewis	1	0	1
8	MF	22	(United States) Dilly Duka	1	0	1
8	MF	53	(United States) Kazu Shigenobu	1	0	1
8	DF	66	(Trinidad and Tobago) Noah Powder	1	0	1
8	DF	92	(United States) Ethan Kutler	1	0	1
Total				42	5	45

- Updated to matches played on November 4, 2017.
- This table does not include secondary assists.

=== Clean Sheets ===
Place	Position	Number	Name	USL	USL Cup	Total
1	GK	40	(Dominican Republic) Rafael Díaz	4	0	4
2	GK	24	(United States) Evan Louro	2	1	3
Total				6	1	7

- Updated to matches played on November 4, 2017.
