= David Najem =

Afghan footballer

Personal information
- Full name: David Najem
- Date of birth: May 26, 1992 (age 34)
- Place of birth: Clifton, New Jersey, United States
- Height: 5 ft 9 in (1.75 m)
- Positions: Full-back; defensive midfielder

Youth career
- 2006–2013: New York Red Bulls
- 2006–2010: Paramus Catholic High School

College career
Years	Team	Apps	(Gls)
2010–2013	Columbia Lions	64	(10)

Senior career*
Years	Team	Apps	(Gls)
2013–2015	FC Eintracht Bamberg	37	(2)
2016–2017	New York Red Bulls II	45	(1)
2018–2019	Tampa Bay Rowdies	17	(1)
2020–2021	New Mexico United	25	(0)

International career
2019–	Afghanistan	12	(0)
- * Club domestic league appearances and goals as of November 8, 2021

David Najem (Dari: داوید نجم; born May 26, 1992) is a professional footballer who plays as a defender for the Afghanistan national team.

Born in the United States, he has represented the Afghanistan internationally. Najem grew up in Clifton, New Jersey and attended Paramus Catholic High School, where he set school career records for both goals and points.

== Career ==
=== Early career ===
Najem was a member of the New York Red Bulls Academy since the age of 14 and played with the U-23 team during his college career. He attended Paramus Catholic High School, where he captained the team for two seasons and set the school record for career goals scored with 54. In 2010, Najem enrolled at Columbia University, and played four seasons with the men's soccer team. During his senior year in 2013, he was awarded as the Ivy League Offensive player of the year, tallying five goals and six assists.

=== Eintracht Bamberg ===
After graduating from Columbia, Najem went on trial with lower division clubs in Germany and eventually signed with FC Eintracht Bamberg from the Regionalliga Bayern league in 2014.

=== New York Red Bulls II ===
On May 19, 2016, Najem returned to the United States to sign with New York Red Bulls II. Najem will partner up with manager, John Wolyniec who formerly played for the New York Red Bulls and coached him in the academy. Najem made his official debut for the club coming on as a late match substitute in a 1–0 victory against FC Montreal. After starting in every match during the clubs playoff run, on October 23, 2016, Najem helped the club to a 5–1 victory over Swope Park Rangers in the 2016 USL Cup Final.

=== Tampa Bay Rowdies ===
Najem signed with the Tampa Bay Rowdies on January 11, 2018.

=== New Mexico United ===
In January 2020, Najem joined New Mexico United.

== International ==
He made his debut for Afghanistan national football team on June 7, 2019, in a friendly against Tajikistan, as a starter.

== Personal life ==
David's brother, Adam, is also a professional footballer.

== Career statistics ==
As of match played November 8, 2021

=== Club statistics ===
Club	Season	League			League Cup		Domestic Cup		Total	
Club	Season	Division	Apps	Goals	Apps	Goals	Apps	Goals	Apps	Goals
FC Eintracht Bamberg	2013–14	Regionalliga Bayern	13	1	0	0	0	0	13	1
FC Eintracht Bamberg	2014–15	Regionalliga Bayern	24	1	0	0	0	0	24	1
FC Eintracht Bamberg	Total		37	2	0	0	0	0	37	2
New York Red Bulls II	2016	USL	15	0	4 (Note: Appearance(s) in USL Cup playoffs)	0	—		19	0
New York Red Bulls II	2017	USL	30	1	3	0	—		34	1
New York Red Bulls II	Total		45	1	7	0	0	0	52	1
Tampa Bay Rowdies	2018	USL	5	0	—		0	0	5	0
Tampa Bay Rowdies	2019	USL Championship	11	1	1 (Note: Appearance(s) in USL Championship playoffs)	0	2 (Note: Appearance(s) in the US Open Cup)	1	14	2
Tampa Bay Rowdies	Total		16	1	1	0	2	1	19	2
New Mexico United	2020	USL Championship	11	0	2	0	—		13	0
New Mexico United	2021	USL Championship	14	0	—		—		14	0
New Mexico United	Total		25	0	2	0	0	0	27	0
Career total			123	4	10	0	2	1	135	5

=== International statistics ===
As of match played June 15, 2021

Caps earned by year
Year	Caps	Goals
2019	2	0
2020	0	0
2021	3	0
Total	5	0

== Honors ==
=== Club ===
New York Red Bulls II

- USL Cup: 2016
