= Noah Powder =

Trinidadian footballer (born 1998)

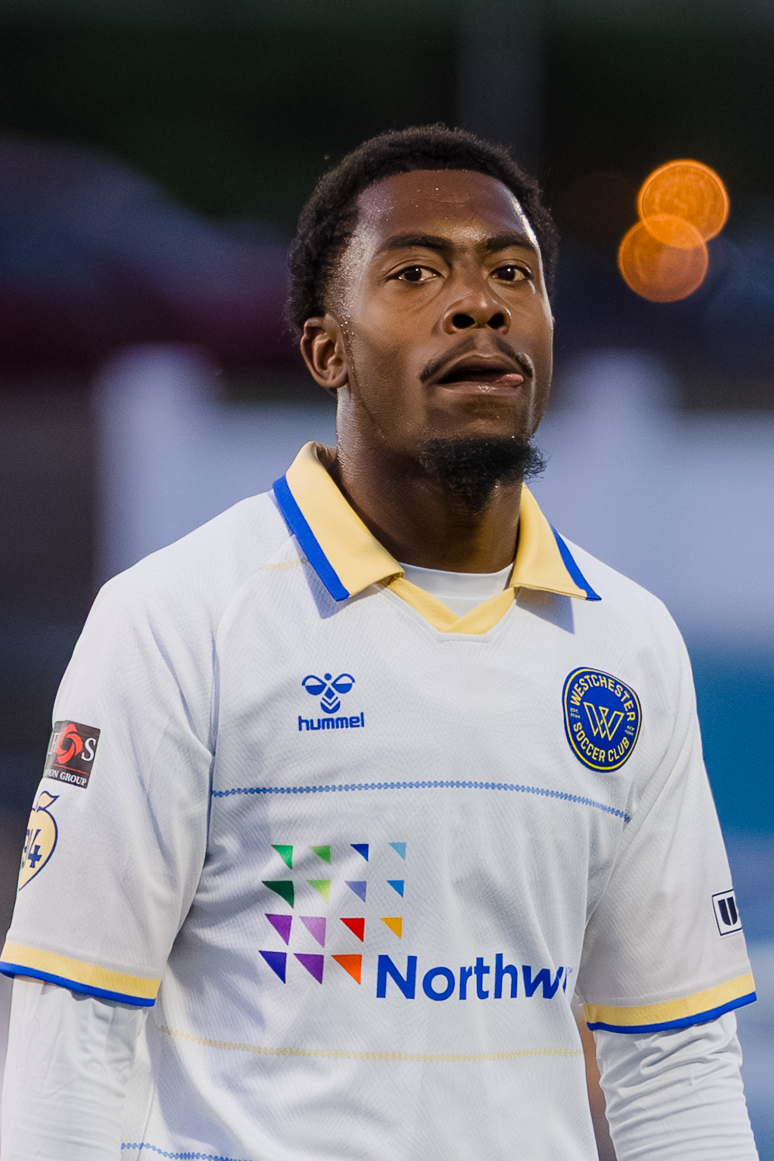
- Powder with Westchester SC in 2026

Personal information
- Date of birth: 27 October 1998 (age 28)
- Place of birth: Edison, New Jersey, United States
- Height: 1.78 m (5 ft 10 in)
- Position: Defender

Team information
- Current team: Westchester SC
- Number: 66

Youth career
- New York Red Bulls

Senior career*
Years	Team	Apps	(Gls)
2016–2017	New York Red Bulls II	28	(3)
2018	Orange County SC	21	(3)
2019–2021	Real Monarchs	51	(5)
2021	Real Salt Lake	7	(0)
2022	Indy Eleven	12	(1)
2022	FC Tulsa	13	(1)
2023–2024	Northern Colorado Hailstorm	36	(6)
2025–	Westchester SC	45	(2)

International career^{‡}
2015	Trinidad and Tobago U17	5	(2)
2016	Trinidad and Tobago U20	8	(2)
2021–	Trinidad and Tobago	21	(2)
- * Club domestic league appearances and goals as of 31 October 2026 ‡ National team caps and goals as of 6 June 2024

Noah Powder (born 27 October 1998) is a professional footballer who plays as a defender for Westchester SC in USL League One. Born in the United States, he represents the Trinidad and Tobago national team.

== Career ==
Powder began his career in the New York Red Bulls Academy and trained with the New York Red Bulls first team during the 2015 season. He made his professional debut for the New York Red Bulls II on March 26, 2016, against Toronto FC II. He started the game and played the full match as the Red Bulls II drew the match 2–2. On September 7, 2016, Powder scored his first two goals as a professional in a 4–1 victory over the Harrisburg City Islanders, helping New York to clinch the 2016 USL Regular Season Championship.

On July 14, 2017, Powder signed his first professional contract with New York Red Bulls II. On September 2, 2017, Powder scored his first goal of the season for New York on a free kick a 4–2 victory over Tampa Bay Rowdies.

After the 2017 season ended, it was announced that Powder and Red Bulls II had agreed to mutually part ways.

Powder joined USL side Orange County SC for their 2018 season.

On January 23, 2019, Powder joined USL club Real Monarchs.

On September 24, 2020, it was announced that Powder would move to Real Monarch's MLS side Real Salt Lake for the 2021 season. Following the 2021 season, Powder's contract option was declined by Salt Lake.

Powder signed with Indy Eleven of the USL Championship on January 14, 2022.

On July 5, 2022, Powder was traded to FC Tulsa in exchange for goalkeeper Sean Lewis. He was released by Tulsa following the 2022 season.

In June 2023, Powder signed with USL League One side Northern Colorado Hailstorm.

Powder signed with USL League One expansion club Westchester SC in January 2025. On 8 March, he made his debut for Westchester coming on as a substitute in a 1–1 draw against Greenville Triumph. He would score his first goal for the club in a 4–4 draw against the Richmond Kickers.

== Personal life ==
Noah Powder has two younger brothers Seth and Samory. Samory also play for Westchester alongside him.

== International career ==
Powder is eligible to play for the US, through birth, or Trinidad and Tobago, through his father, internationally. In 2015, he rejected an approach from the US expressing a preference for remaining part of the T&T international set up.

Powder played for the Trinidad and Tobago national under-17 football team in 2015 serving as team captain. In 2016, he received his first call up to the U20 team.

Powder was called up by the Trinidad and Tobago national team in February 2025, making him the first international call-up ever for Westchester SC.

== Career statistics ==
As of November 3, 2018

Club	Season	League			Playoffs		US Open Cup		CONCACAF		Total	
Club	Season	Division	Apps	Goals	Apps	Goals	Apps	Goals	Apps	Goals	Apps	Goals
New York Red Bulls II	2016	USL	18	2	2	0	–		–		20	2
New York Red Bulls II	2017	USL	10	1	0	0	–		–		10	1
New York Red Bulls II	Total		28	3	2	0	0	0	0	0	30	3
Orange County SC	2018	USL	21	3	1	0	1	0	–		23	3
Career total			49	6	3	0	1	0	0	0	53	6

== Honors ==
New York Red Bulls II

- USL Cup: 2016

Real Monarchs

- USL Cup: 2019
