= Bilyeu =

Bilyeu is a surname possibly with French origin. Notable people with the surname include:

- Diane Bilyeu (born 1935), American politician
- Justin Bilyeu (born 1994), American soccer player
