= Paramus Catholic High School =

Private high school in Bergen County, New Jersey, US

Location
- 425 Paramus Road; Paramus, Bergen County, New Jersey 07652; United States; 40°57′20″N 74°5′45″W

Information
- Type: Private, Coeducational
- Religious affiliation: Roman Catholic
- Established: 1965
- Founders: Thomas Aloysius Boland; Joseph P. Tuite
- School district: Archdiocese of Newark
- Superintendent: Margaret Dames
- NCES School ID: 00863329
- President: Chris Farrell
- Principal: Joan M. Silo
- Chaplain: Fr. Donald Hummel
- Faculty: 103.0 FTEs
- Grades: 9–12
- Enrollment: 1,353 (as of 2017–18)
- Average class size: 24
- Student to teacher ratio: 13.1:1
- Colors: Black and Vegas gold
- Athletics conference: Big North Conference (general); North Jersey Super Football Conference (football)
- Mascot: The Paladin
- Team name: Paladins
- Accreditation: Middle States Association of Colleges and Schools
- Tuition: $14,250 (2025–26)
- Website: www.paramuscatholic.com

Paramus Catholic High School is a co-educational Roman Catholic high school located in Paramus in Bergen County, in the U.S. state of New Jersey. The school, founded in 1965, under Archbishop Thomas A. Boland, and Superintendent of Schools, Monsignor Joseph P. Tuite, Paramus Catholic operated as a co-institutional school until 1995. Paramus Catholic was staffed by the Brothers of Christian Schools under the leadership of Bro. James P. Kelly, FSC, Principal, and Paramus Catholic Girls' High School by the Sisters of Charity of Convent Station, New Jersey, under the leadership of Sr. Helen Demetria, SC, Principal. There was a sharing of the plant and facility, however, the two schools operated as separate academic institutions. Paramus Catholic was the last secondary school established by the Archdiocese of Newark in Bergen County. The two schools were unified into one by the Archdiocese of Newark beginning in the 1995–1996 school year. When the school was unified to one academic institution, the Christian Brothers withdrew from involvement, and the Sisters of Charity took over leadership, until their withdrawal from the school in the early 2000s. Paramus Catholic High School is one of several high schools in the Archdiocese of Newark. It has the largest enrollment of any Roman Catholic high school in the state of New Jersey.

Paramus Catholic is accredited by the Middle States Association of Colleges and Schools Commission on Elementary and Secondary Schools since 1996 and is accredited through July 2027. Only one student is accepted for every four applicants.

As of the 2017–18 school year, the school had an enrollment of 1,353 students and 103.0 classroom teachers (on an FTE basis), for a student–teacher ratio of 13.1:1. The school's student body was 33.1% (448) White, 22.9% (310) Hispanic, 18.8% (254) Black, 14.8% (200) Asian and 6.9% (93) two or more races.

== Extracurricular activities and athletics ==
The Paramus Catholic High School Paladins compete in the Big North Conference, which is comprised of public and private high schools in Bergen and Passaic counties, and was established following a reorganization of sports leagues in Northern New Jersey by the New Jersey State Interscholastic Athletic Association. Prior to the 2010 realignment, the school participated in the North Bergen Interscholastic Athletic League (NBIAL). With 914 students in grades 10–12, the school was classified by the NJSIAA for the 2019–20 school year as Non-Public A for most athletic competition purposes, which included schools with an enrollment of 381 to 1,454 students in that grade range (equivalent to Group III for public schools). The football team competes in the United Red division of the North Jersey Super Football Conference, which includes 112 schools competing in 20 divisions, making it the nation's biggest football-only high school sports league. The school was classified by the NJSIAA as Non-Public Group B (equivalent to Group I/II for public schools) for football for 2024–2026, which included schools with 140 to 686 students. In addition to football, cheer and girls basketball, they are also a consistent power in ice hockey, girls swimming, and boys basketball. Their biggest rivals include Bergen Catholic High School, Immaculate Heart Academy, St. Joseph Regional High School, Academy of the Holy Angels and Don Bosco Preparatory High School.

The school is known for its cheerleading squad and dance team. They both have won many national and state titles such as the 2002 State cheer champions, 2003 EDA National dance champions, 2004 Spirit Championship champions, 2005 NDA junior varsity pom national champions, 2006 Spirit Sports National champions, 2007 State Parochial cheer champions, 2007 EDA National dance champions and 2008 EDA National Dance Champions-Varsity Jazz/JV Jazz and Pom and Prop. 2009 EDA National Dance Team Champions- JV Jazz and Pom and Prop. 2010 EDA National Dance Team Champions- Varsity Hip Hop and Variety and JV Jazz and Pom.

The boys cross country running team won the Non-Public Group A state championship in 1972 and 1975.

The boys' track team won the Non-Public indoor relay state championship in 1977.

The girls basketball team won the Group III state championship in 1978 (vs. Edgewood Regional High School) and in 1979 (vs. Ocean City High School), won the Non-Public A title in 1984 (vs. Notre Dame High School), 1985 (vs. Bishop George Ahr High School) and 1986 (vs. Paul VI), and was the Non-Public B champion in 2013 (vs. Morris Catholic High School). The program's five state titles are tied for tenth-most in the state. Led by Anne Donovan, the 1978 team finished the season with a 27–2 record after winning the Group III state title with a 60–58 win against Edgewood in the championship game. The 1984 team went 28–0 after defeating Notre Dame in the tournament final by a score of 72–44 to win the Parochial A state title. The team won the 2001 Parochial North A title with a 49–42 win over Immaculata High School.

The girls soccer team won the Non-Public state championship in 1982, defeating Notre Dame High School in the tournament final.

The girls volleyball team won the Group IV state championship in 1983 (vs. Hackensack High School), 1998 (vs. Hackensack), 1990 (vs. Lakeland Regional High School), 1991 (vs. Memorial High School of West New York), 1992 (vs. Memorial - West New York), 1993 (vs. Immaculate Heart Academy), 1995 (vs. Ridgewood High School), and won the Group III title in 1998 (vs. Northern Valley Regional High School at Demarest) and 1999 (vs. Ramapo High School); the team's 10 group titles are tied for fifth-most in the state. The 1983 team finished the season with a 30–1 record after winning the Group IV state championship in two games (15-11 and 15–9) against Hackensack in the final match of the tournament. The team finished the 1990 season with a 28–0 record after winning the Group IV title in two games (15-1, 15–6) against Lakeland Regional in the finals.

The softball team won the Non-Public A state title in 1987, defeating runner-up Paul VI High School in the final game of the tournament. The team won the Parochial North A state sectional championship in 2001 with a string of shutout victories, topping Mount Saint Dominic Academy 2–0 in the first round, Immaculate Heart Academy 2–0 in the semifinals and Pope John XXIII Regional High School 2–0 in the tournament final.

The 1992 baseball team finished the season with a 29–2 after winning the Non-Public A state championship, defeating Paul VI High School by a score of 4–2 in the final game of the tournament at Rutgers University.

The football team won the Non-Public Group III state sectional championship in 1997 and the Non-Public Group IV title in 2012, 2013 and 2016. With the hiring of alumni Chris Partridge, the Paramus Catholic football team improved and began to compete more effectively against Bergen Catholic High School and Don Bosco Preparatory High School in New Jersey's Group IV Non-Public division. In December 2012, the Paramus Catholic football team won the Non-Public Group IV state championship against Bergen Catholic High School by a final score of 37–34 on a touchdown scored with 1:16 left in the game. This was the program's first Group IV title and its first sectional championship since 1997. In 2013 and 2016, the football team won the Non-Public Group IV state sectional championship, defeating St. Peter's Preparatory School by scores of 13–6 and 33–28 respectively in the tournament final.

The girls track team won the winter track Non-Public A state title in 2009 (as co-champion) and 2010.

In summer 2010, Paramus Catholic formed a marching band for the first time, making it the only Catholic high school to have a marching band in the Archdiocese of Newark and Paterson.

In August 2020, it was revealed that two former male students were suing the school, alleging that a former hockey coach had molested them numerous times on school grounds and while on school-sanctioned athletic trips between 1986 and 1988. The two former students, whose ages ranged from 14 to 15 at the time of the alleged abuse, also alleged that Archdiocese of Newark, the school and Archbishop Theodore McCarrick had covered up the abuse after it was reported as well. In October 2020, eight more former Paramus Catholic students filed lawsuits accusing former hockey coach Bernard Garris of sexually abusing them.

== Weekend school ==
As of November 2022 the Japanese Weekend School of New Jersey (ニュージャージー補習授業校), a Japanese supplementary weekend school, holds classes at Paramus Catholic, while the school offices are in Fort Lee. It is one of the two weekend Japanese school systems operated by the Japanese Educational Institute of New York (JEI; ニューヨーク日本人教育審議会 Nyūyōku Nihonjin Kyōiku Shingi Kai), a nonprofit organization which also operates two Japanese day schools in the New York City area.

== Notable alumni ==
- E. J. Anosike (born 1997), basketball player
- David Brock (born 1962), journalist and author
- Brendan Burke (born 1984), sportscaster for Fox Sports, the New York Islanders, and formerly the Utica Comets of the American Hockey League
- Juwann Bushell-Beatty (born 1995), offensive lineman for the St. Louis BattleHawks
- Nunzio Campanile, offensive coordinator for the UConn Huskies football team
- Anthony DiCosmo (born 1977), former American football player and current Vice President of Sports Marketing at Air Jordan Brand
- Anne Donovan (1961–2018), Connecticut Sun basketball coach and head coach of the United States women's national basketball team at the 2008 Beijing Olympics
- Danielle Etienne (born 2001), footballer who plays as a midfielder for the Haiti women's national team
- Rashan Gary (born 1997), linebacker for the Green Bay Packers
- Malachi Goodman, American football offensive tackle for the Penn State Nittany Lions
- Jason Hernandez (born 1983), Manager for Player Engagement with Toronto FC
- Darren Lemke (born 1969/70), screenwriter who co-wrote the 2010 film Shrek Forever After and director of the 2004 thriller film Lost, which he also wrote
- Christian Mahogany (born 2000), guard for the Detroit Lions
- Adam Najem (born 1995), soccer midfielder who plays for FC Edmonton in the Canadian Premier League and the Afghanistan national team
- David Najem (born 1992), soccer player who plays as a Midfielder for New Mexico United in the USL Championship and the Afghanistan national team
- Chris Partridge (born 1980), outside linebackers coach for the Seattle Seahawks
- Henry Pearson (born 1999), tight end who played in the NFL for the Green Bay Packers
- Jabrill Peppers (born 1995), safety for the Pittsburgh Steelers
- Jordan Saling (born 1996), soccer player who plays for Flower City Union in the National Independent Soccer Association and the Puerto Rico national football team
- Jussie Smollett (born 1982), actor who appeared in the Fox TV series Empire
