= Malachi Goodman =

American football player

No. 78 – Penn State Nittany Lions
- Position: Offensive tackle
- Class: Redshirt Freshman

Personal information
- Listed height: 6 ft 6 in (1.98 m)
- Listed weight: 330 lb (150 kg)

Career information
- High school: Paramus Catholic (Paramus, New Jersey)
- College: Penn State (2025–present)
- Stats at ESPN

Malachi J. Goodman is an American football offensive tackle for the Penn State Nittany Lions.

== Early life ==
Goodman grew up in Bloomfield, New Jersey, and attended Paramus Catholic High School in Paramus, New Jersey. Rated as a four-star recruit by 247Sports, he committed to play college football for the Penn State Nittany Lions over offers from other schools such as Alabama, Auburn, Georgia, Ohio State, and USC.

== College career ==
As a freshman in 2025, Goodman was redshirted and did not appear in any games. He entered the 2026 season, in position to start at offensive tackle for the Nittany Lions.
