= Zoumana Simpara =

Malian football player

Personal information
- Full name: Zoumana Simpara
- Date of birth: February 22, 1998 (age 28)
- Place of birth: Bamako, Mali
- Height: 6 ft 2 in (1.88 m)
- Position: Midfielder

Youth career
- 2015: AS Korofina

Senior career*
Years	Team	Apps	(Gls)
2016	AS Bakaridjan	0	(0)
2016	New York Red Bulls II	19	(2)
2017–2020	AS Bakaridjan		
2020–2021	Djoliba AC		
2021–2023	Toulon	20	(6)

International career^{‡}
2015	Mali U17	2	(0)
2021	Mali	2	(0)
- * Club domestic league appearances and goals as of 21:40, 24 December 2023 (UTC) ‡ National team caps and goals as of 16 June 2026

Zoumana Simpara (born 2 February 1998) is a Malian footballer who plays as a midfielder.

== Career ==
=== Club career ===
Simpara was a member of AS Korofina and AS Bakaridjan in the Malian Première Division. While with AS Bakaridjan in 2016, Simpara made two appearances for the club in the CAF Confederation Cup against Tunisian club Stade Gabèsien.

On 16 April 2016, Simpara signed with American third division side and New York Red Bulls affiliate club, New York Red Bulls II in the United Soccer League. The following day, Simpara made his debut for the club as a second-half substitute in a scoreless draw against the Rochester Rhinos. On 2 August 2016 Simpara scored his first goal for New York in a 5–0 rout over Harrisburg City Islanders. On 12 August Simpara scored his second goal of the season for New York in a 5–1 victory over Orlando City B.

Simpara was released by Red Bulls II in November 2016.

=== International career ===
During the 2015 FIFA U-17 World Cup Simpara made two appearances for Mali against Belgium and Honduras.

== Career statistics ==
As of 22 April 2016

Club	Season	League		League Cup		Domestic Cup		Continental		Total	
Club	Season	Apps	Goals	Apps	Goals	Apps	Goals	Apps	Goals	Apps	Goals
AS Bakaridjan	2016	0	0	0	0	0	0	2	0	2	0
Total		0	0	0	0	0	0	2	0	2	0
New York Red Bulls II	2016	19	2	3	0	0	0	0	0	22	2
Career total		19	2	3	0	0	0	2	0	24	2

== Honors ==
=== Club ===
New York Red Bulls II

- USL Cup (1): 2016
