= 2016 USL Cup playoffs =

2016 USL Cup
Tournament details
- Country: United States; Canada
- Teams: 16

Final positions
- Champions: New York Red Bull II
- Runners-up: Swope Park Rangers

Tournament statistics
- Matches played: 15
- Goals scored: 50 (3.33 per match)
- Top goal scorer: Brandon Allen (6)

The 2016 USL playoffs is a postseason tournament following the 2016 United Soccer League regular season, the second since the league rebranded for the 2015 season. Including USL Pro history, it is the fifth postseason tournament. The tournament began on September 30 and will last until October 23.

Sixteen teams (top 8 per conference) will compete, up from 12 last season, in the single elimination tournament. Teams will be seeded one through eight in each conference. The conference semifinal winners will play against each other in the Conference Championship, which will serve as the overall semifinals for the playoff. The winners of the Eastern and Western Conference Championship will play for the championship. The winner of the playoffs will be crowned league champion with the USL Cup.

== USL conference standings ==
The top 8 teams from each conference advance to the USL playoffs.

Eastern Conference

Pos	Team	Pld	Pts
1	New York Red Bulls II (C, X)	30	69
2	Louisville City FC	30	60
3	FC Cincinnati	30	56
4	Rochester Rhinos	30	51
5	Charlotte Independence	30	50
6	Charleston Battery	30	48
7	Richmond Kickers	30	45
8	Orlando City B	30	35
9	Wilmington Hammerheads FC	30	34
10	Harrisburg City Islanders	30	31
11	Bethlehem Steel FC	30	28
12	Toronto FC II	30	26
13	Pittsburgh Riverhounds	30	25
14	FC Montreal	30	23

Source: 2016 USL Standings
(C) Champions; (X) Regular Season League Champion

Western Conference

Pos	Team	Pld	Pts
1	Sacramento Republic	30	52
2	Rio Grande Valley Toros	30	51
3	Colorado Springs Switchbacks	30	49
4	Swope Park Rangers	30	48
5	LA Galaxy II	30	47
6	Vancouver Whitecaps 2	30	45
7	Oklahoma City Energy	30	43
8	Orange County Blues	30	40
9	Portland Timbers 2	30	40
10	San Antonio FC	30	38
11	Real Monarchs	30	36
12	Seattle Sounders 2	30	35
13	Arizona United	30	34
14	Saint Louis FC	30	34
15	Tulsa Roughnecks	30	19

Source: 2016 USL Standings

== Bracket ==
First round
October 2 – Red Bull Arena
#1 New York Red Bulls II	4
#8 Orlando City B	0
October 1 – Rochester Rhinos Stadium
#4 Rochester Rhinos	3
#5 Charlotte Independence	1
October 2 – Nippert Stadium
#3 FC Cincinnati	1
#6 Charleston Battery	2
October 2 – Louisville Slugger Field
#2 Louisville City FC (a.e.t.)	2
#7 Richmond Kickers	0
October 1 – Bonney Field
#1 Sacramento Republic FC	0 (4)
#8 Orange County Blues FC (p)	0 (5)
September 30 – Swope Soccer Village
#4 Swope Park Rangers	3
#5 LA Galaxy II	0
September 30 – Switchbacks Stadium
#3 Colorado Springs Switchbacks FC	1
#6 Vancouver Whitecaps FC 2	2
October 1 – H-E-B Park
#2 Rio Grande Valley FC Toros	2
#7 Oklahoma City Energy FC	3

Conference Semifinals
October 7 – Red Bull Arena
#1 New York Red Bulls II (p)	3 (5)
#4 Rochester Rhinos	3 (4)
October 8 – Louisville Slugger Field
#6 Charleston Battery	0
#2 Louisville City FC	1
October 9 – Swope Soccer Village
#8 Orange County Blues FC	1
#4 Swope Park Rangers (a.e.t.)	2
October 8 – Thunderbird Stadium
#6 Vancouver Whitecaps FC 2	3
#7 Oklahoma City Energy FC	2

Conference finals
October 16 - Red Bull Arena
#1 New York Red Bulls II (p)	1 (4)
#2 Louisville City FC	1 (3)
October 15 - Swope Soccer Village
#4 Swope Park Rangers	3
#6 Vancouver Whitecaps FC 2	0

USL Championship
October 23 - Red Bull Arena
#1 New York Red Bulls II	5
#4 Swope Park Rangers	1

== Schedule ==
=== Conference quarterfinals ===
September 30, 2016	Swope Park Rangers	3–0	LA Galaxy II	Kansas City, Missouri
7:30 pm CDT	Tyrpak 76'; Gonzalez 90+3', 90+5'	USL Report	Amaya (yellow card) 9'; Villarreal (yellow card) 33' (yellow-red card) 65'; Covarrubias (yellow card) 59'; Payeras (yellow card) 79'	Stadium: Swope Soccer Village; Attendance: 1,885; Referee: Guido Gonzales Jr.

September 30, 2016	Colorado Springs Switchbacks FC	1–2	Vancouver Whitecaps FC 2	Colorado Springs, Colorado
7:00 pm MDT	Vercollone 7'; Ibeagha (yellow card) 44'	USL Report	Greig 17'; Froese 31'	Stadium: Switchbacks Stadium; Attendance: 2,405; Referee: Ramy Touchan

October 1, 2016	Rochester Rhinos	3–1	Charlotte Independence	Rochester, New York
6:05 pm EDT	Fall 7'; Dos Santos 24'; Tergou 70' (yellow card) 87'; Totsch (yellow card) 90+1'	USL Report	Duckett (yellow card) 5'; Hassan 75'; Davidson (yellow card) 79' (red card) 82'; Metcalf (red card) 80'; Martínez (yellow card) 90+1' (red card) 90+6'	Stadium: Rochester Rhinos Stadium; Attendance: 2,080; Referee: Henrik Karlsson

October 1, 2016	Rio Grande Valley FC Toros	2–3	Oklahoma City Energy	Edinburg, Texas
7:30 pm CDT	Luna 33'; Ward (yellow card) 53'; Bird 76'; Greene (yellow card) 83'	USL Report	Ryden (yellow card) 72'; Olsson 73'; Bonner 90+2', 90+3'	Stadium: H-E-B Park; Attendance: 2,701; Referee: Rosendo Mendoza

October 1, 2016	Sacramento Republic FC	0–0 (a.e.t.) (4–5 p)	Orange County Blues FC	Sacramento, California
7:30 pm PDT		USL Report	Sheldon (yellow card) 68'; Mirković (yellow card) 108'; Griffiths (yellow card) 120'	Stadium: Bonney Field; Attendance: 10,962; Referee: Timothy Ford
	Penalties
	Trickett-Smith (penalty scored); Iwasa (penalty scored); Koval (penalty missed); Guzman (penalty scored); Cole (penalty scored)		Meeus (penalty scored); Chaplow (penalty scored); Stevanovic (penalty scored); Barouch (penalty scored); Crettenand (penalty scored)

October 2, 2016	New York Red Bulls II	4–0	Orlando City B	Harrison, New Jersey
4:00 pm EDT	Long 32', 77'; Bezecourt 59'; Allen 67'	USL Report	Ribeiro (yellow card) 30'; Neal (yellow card) 46'; Heath (red card) 62'	Stadium: Red Bull Arena; Attendance: 1,088; Referee: Matthew Kreitzer

October 2, 2016	FC Cincinnati	1–2	Charleston Battery	Cincinnati, Ohio
4:00 pm EDT	Stevenson 19'	USL Report	Tsonis 40'; Chang (yellow card) 62'; Prince 65'	Stadium: Nippert Stadium; Attendance: 30,187; Referee: Kevin Terry Jr.

October 2, 2016	Louisville City FC	2–0 (a.e.t.)	Richmond Kickers	Louisville, Kentucky
7:00 pm EDT	Davis IV 92'; Hoffman 102'	USL Report	Asante (red card) 6'; Lee (yellow card) 21'; Yeisley (yellow card) 34'; Yomby (yellow card) 40'; Troyer (yellow card) 42'	Stadium: Louisville Slugger Field; Attendance: 5,467; Referee: Andrew Musashe

=== Conference semifinals ===
October 7, 2016	New York Red Bulls II	3–3 (a.e.t.) (5–4 p)	Rochester Rhinos	Harrison, New Jersey
7:00 pm	Etienne 20'; Allen 44', 119' (pen.); Adams (yellow card) 57'; Metzger (yellow card) 63'; Carroll (yellow card) 82'	USL Report	Farrell (yellow card) 20'; Dos Santos 22', 55'; Tergou (yellow card) 40'; Fall 110'	Stadium: Red Bull Arena; Attendance: 1,229; Referee: Luis Guardia
	Penalties
	Long (penalty scored); Etienne (penalty scored); Allen (penalty scored); Metzger (penalty scored); Plewa (penalty scored)		(penalty scored) Fall; (penalty scored) Farrell; (penalty scored) Apostolopoulos; (penalty missed) Dos Santos; (penalty scored) Kyriazis

October 8, 2016	Vancouver Whitecaps FC 2	3–2	Oklahoma City Energy	Vancouver, British Columbia
3:00 pm	Seymore (yellow card) 20'; Froese 27'; Greig 48'; Haber 89'	USL Report	Thomas (yellow card) 23'; König 60' (yellow card) 90'; Andrews (yellow card) 61'; Pitter 80'	Stadium: Thunderbird Stadium; Attendance: 1,308; Referee: Pierre-Luc Lauziere

October 8, 2016	Louisville City FC	1–0	Charleston Battery	Louisville, Kentucky
7:30 pm	Smith (yellow card) 45+1'; Dacres 53'; Reynolds (yellow card) 90+4'	USL Report	Tsonis (yellow card) 24'; Marini (yellow card) 62'; Adjetey (yellow card) 67'; Woodbine (red card) 90+4'	Stadium: Louisville Slugger Field; Attendance: 6,581; Referee: Mark Kadlecik

October 9, 2016	Swope Park Rangers	2–1 (a.e.t.)	Orange County Blues FC	Kansas City, Missouri
4:00 pm	Gonzalez 20'; Duke (yellow card) 40'; Alvarado (red card) 69'; Meyer (red card) 88'; Kelly 105'	USL Report	Rauhofer 70'	Stadium: Swope Soccer Village; Attendance: 2,181; Referee: Nima Saghafi

=== Conference finals ===
October 15, 2016	Swope Park Rangers	3–0	Vancouver Whitecaps FC 2	Kansas City, Missouri
7:30 PM	Tyrpak 8', 32'; Selbol (yellow card) 83' (red card) 90+2'; Molano (yellow card) 88'; Kelly 89'	USL Report	de Wit (yellow card) 90'	Stadium: Swope Soccer Village; Attendance: 2,922; Referee: Juan Guzman

October 16, 2016	New York Red Bulls II	1–1 (a.e.t.) (4–3 p)	Louisville City FC	Harrison, New Jersey
6:00 PM	Valot 74'; Williams (red card) 118'	USL Report	Craig 11' (yellow card) 102' (red card) 120+'; Reynolds (red card) 104'	Stadium: Red Bull Arena; Attendance: 2,709; Referee: Robert Sibiga
	Penalties
	Etienne (penalty scored); Long (penalty scored); Allen (penalty scored); Bezecourt (penalty scored)		(penalty missed) Lancaster; (penalty scored) Smith; (penalty scored) Quinn; (penalty scored) Kaye; (penalty missed) Newnam

=== USL Championship ===
October 23, 2016	New York Red Bulls II	5–1	Swope Park Rangers	Harrison, New Jersey
8:00 PM	Etienne 18'; Allen 39,85,88'; Metzger (yellow card) 72'; Bezecourt 90+2'	USL Report	Granitto 74'	Stadium: Red Bull Arena; Attendance: 5,547; Referee: Armando Villarreal

Championship Game MVP: Brandon Allen (NYRB)

== Top goalscorers ==
Rank	Player	Club	Goals
1	(United States) Brandon Allen	New York Red Bulls II	6
2	(Cape Verde) Steevan Dos Santos	Rochester Rhinos	3
2	(Canada) Mark Anthony Gonzalez	Swope Park Rangers	3
2	(United States) Kris Tyrpak	Swope Park Rangers	3
5	(France) Vincent Bezecourt	New York Red Bulls II	2
5	(United States) Aaron Long	New York Red Bulls II	2
5	(Haiti) Derrick Etienne	New York Red Bulls II	2
5	(Germany) Wal Fall	Rochester Rhinos	2
5	(Canada) Kianz Froese	Whitecaps FC 2	2
5	(United States) Kyle Greig	Whitecaps FC 2	2
5	(United States) Colin Bonner	Oklahoma City Energy FC	2
