= Adam Najem =

Afghan footballer (born 1995)

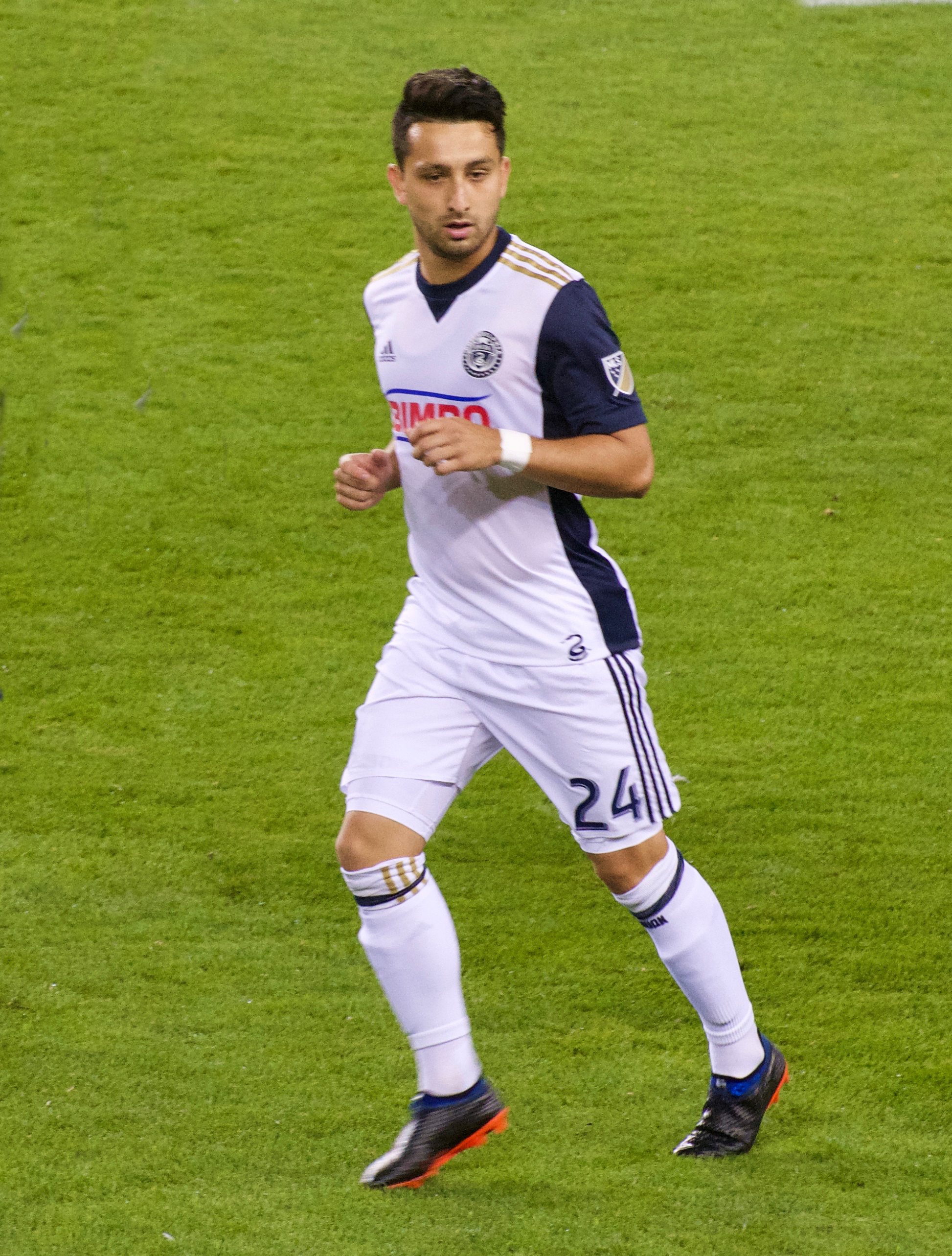
- Najem with Philadelphia Union in 2017

Personal information
- Full name: Adam Ahmad Najem
- Date of birth: January 19, 1995 (age 31)
- Place of birth: Clifton, New Jersey, United States
- Height: 1.73 m (5 ft 8 in)
- Position: Defensive midfielder

Youth career
- 2006–2013: New York Red Bulls
- 2009–2013: Paramus Catholic High School

College career
Years	Team	Apps	(Gls)
2013–2016	Akron Zips	89	(33)

Senior career*
Years	Team	Apps	(Gls)
2015	New York Red Bulls U23	6	(0)
2016	Michigan Bucks	11	(1)
2017–2018	Philadelphia Union	5	(0)
2017–2018	→ Bethlehem Steel (loan)	37	(5)
2019	Memphis 901	29	(4)
2020	Wigry Suwałki	2	(0)
2020	Tampa Bay Rowdies	6	(0)
2021	FC Edmonton	16	(1)
2022	New York Red Bulls II	4	(0)
2022–2024	Bhayangkara	45	(1)

International career
2018–2021	Afghanistan	15	(0)
- * Club domestic league appearances and goals as of January 6, 2025

Adam Ahmad Najem (Persian: آدام نجم; born January 19, 1995) is a professional footballer who plays as a defensive midfielder. Born in the United States, he played for the Afghanistan national team.

== Career ==
=== Youth and college ===
Raised in Clifton, New Jersey, Najem played prep soccer at Paramus Catholic High School.

Najem played four years of college soccer at the University of Akron between 2013 and 2016, making 89 appearances, scoring 33 goals and tallying 29 assists.

While at college, Najem also appeared for Premier Development League sides New York Red Bulls U23 and Michigan Bucks, where he won the 2016 PDL Championship.

=== Club ===
Najem signed with Major League Soccer side Philadelphia Union on February 8, 2017, after acquiring his rights from New York Red Bulls in exchange for a second-round 2018 MLS SuperDraft pick. He made his professional debut on April 1, 2017, while on loan with the Union's United Soccer League affiliate Bethlehem Steel, playing 90 minutes in a 3–2 loss to Rochester Rhinos.

Najem joined USL Championship expansion club Memphis 901 on February 5, 2019.

Najem joined Polish I liga club Wigry Suwałki on January 22, 2020

On August 5, 2020, Najem returned to the United States, joining USL Championship side Tampa Bay Rowdies.

On August 9, 2021, Najem signed with Canadian Premier League side Edmonton. On February 9, 2022, the club announced that Najem and all but two other players would not be returning for the 2022 season.

On May 19, 2022, Najem signed a 25-day short-term contract with New York Red Bulls II. Najem made his first appearance for New York on May 21, 2022, in a 2–0 loss to Indy Eleven.

=== International ===
In August 2018, Najem received his first international call-up to the Afghanistan national team.

== Personal ==
Adam's brother, David, is also a professional footballer.

After his playing career, Adam joined new MLS Next Pro team CT United as their Director of Scouting.
