= Brandon Allen (soccer) =

American soccer player (born 1993)

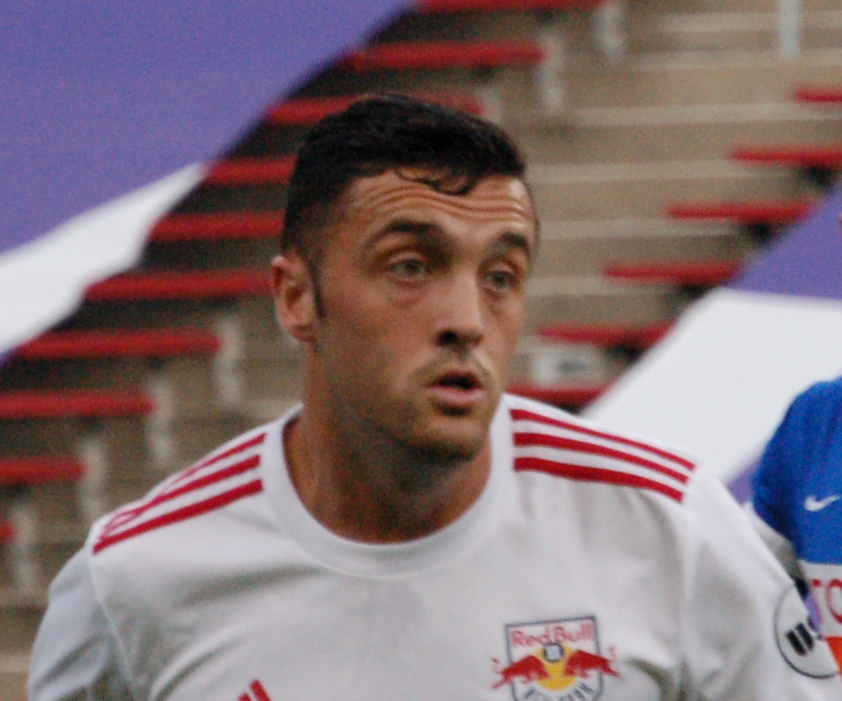
- Allen playing for New York Red Bulls II in 2016

Personal information
- Full name: Brandon Allen
- Date of birth: October 8, 1993 (age 33)
- Place of birth: Old Bridge, New Jersey, United States
- Height: 6 ft 1 in (1.85 m)
- Position: Forward

Youth career
- 2010–2012: New York Red Bulls

College career
Years	Team	Apps	(Gls)
2012–2015	Georgetown Hoyas	91	(50)

Senior career*
Years	Team	Apps	(Gls)
2014	Baltimore Bohemians	2	(1)
2016–2017	New York Red Bulls	1	(0)
2016–2017	→ New York Red Bulls II (loan)	42	(24)
2017	→ Minnesota United (loan)	1	(0)
2018	Bethlehem Steel	7	(2)
2018	Nashville SC	21	(8)
2019	Tampa Bay Rowdies	8	(1)
2019–2020	Memphis 901	34	(12)
2021	Oakland Roots	7	(0)

International career^{‡}
2012–2013	United States U20	6	(1)
Medal record
Representing United States
Runner-up	CONCACAF U-20 Championship	2013
- * Club domestic league appearances and goals as of November 8, 2021 ‡ National team caps and goals as of December 21, 2015

Brandon Allen (born October 8, 1993) is an American former professional soccer player who played as a forward. Allen is the younger brother of soccer player R. J. Allen.

== Early career ==
Allen attended St. Joseph High School in Metuchen, NJ where he scored 118 goals throughout his four-year varsity career. During his time in high school he was also a member of the New York Red Bulls' academy program where he scored 28 goals during the 2010–2011 season followed by 27 goals in 2011–2012. During his tenure at Georgetown, Allen was a standout player where he earned All-American honors three times and was named as a finalist for the Hermann Trophy in 2015. At the conclusion of his 91-game career with the Hoyas, Allen recorded 50 goals and 17 assists, making him the all-time leading scorer in school history.

Allen was also a member of the 2014 Baltimore Bohemians in the Premier Development League.

== Professional career ==
=== New York Red Bulls ===
On December 21, 2015, Allen signed a Homegrown Contract with the New York Red Bulls, where he stated in his first interview with the club, "I've waited a long time for this, all my life, but I enjoyed my college career and a lot of my success came from my teammates and my senior class was a big part of my success so I want to thank them. I'm very excited to get started here at the Red Bulls." He joins former academy and New York Red Bulls II players, Derrick Etienne and Tyler Adams as the third homegrown player signing this season, and adds to a league high of seven on the club for 2016.

Allen made his professional debut for New York Red Bulls II on March 26, scoring two goals in a 2–2 draw against Toronto FC II. The following week, Allen scored another goal for the club in a 2–0 victory against Louisville City FC. On May 28, Allen made his first team debut, coming on as a second-half substitute in a 3–0 victory against Toronto FC. On July 9, Allen scored his first professional hat trick in a 4–2 victory against FC Montreal. He was later awarded as the USL Player of the Week for his performance. On October 2, 2016, Long scored his sixteenth of the season to help New York Red Bulls II advance to the Eastern Conference Semifinals of the 2016 USL Playoffs in a 4–0 victory over Orlando City B. In the following match against Rochester Rhinos, Allen scored two goals, including a 119th minute pk equalizer which sent the match to a penalty shootout, which New York won 5–4 to advance to the Eastern Conference Final of the 2016 USL Cup Playoffs. On October 23, Allen recorded a hat trick and provided an assist in leading New York to a 5–1 victory over Swope Park Rangers in the 2016 USL Cup Final. For his performance he was named USL Cup Final MVP. On October 18, 2016, Allen was named to the 2016 USL All-League First Team after leading New York with 21 goals in all competitions. On November 3, 2016, it was announced that Allen was voted as the 2016 USL Rookie of the Year.

On 6 May 2017, Allen recorded his first two-goal game of the season for New York Red Bulls II, netting on two penalty kicks, in a 3–1 victory over Harrisburg City Islanders.

=== Minnesota United ===
In July 2017, Allen secured a loan move to Minnesota United FC until the conclusion of the 2017 season. Looking for more playing time, Allen would only register one league appearance for the Loons.

=== Bethlehem Steel ===
On January 8, 2018, Allen signed with United Soccer League side Bethlehem Steel.

=== Nashville SC ===
On May 22, 2018, USL side Nashville SC announced they had paid a transfer fee for Brandon Allen. On November 14, 2018, Nashville announced that they had not re-signed Allen for the 2019 season.

=== Tampa Bay Rowdies ===
On December 5, 2018, Allen signed with USL Championship side Tampa Bay Rowdies. Allen scored one league goal for the Rowdies, on April 24, against Atlanta United 2. Allen also scored in each of the Rowdies two U.S. Open Cup matches.

=== Memphis 901 FC ===
On June 26, 2019, Allen was acquired by USL Championship expansion team Memphis 901 FC. At the time of his signing, Memphis sat last in the league in goals scored.

=== Oakland Roots ===
On June 28, 2021, Allen signed with USL Championship side Oakland Roots.

== International career ==
Allen represented the United States at multiple levels including the U-18 and U-20 squads.

== Career statistics ==
As of 13 October 2018

Club	Season	League		League Cup		Domestic Cup		CONCACAF		Total	
Club	Season	Apps	Goals	Apps	Goals	Apps	Goals	Apps	Goals	Apps	Goals
New York Red Bulls	2016	1	0	0	0	0	0	0	0	1	0
New York Red Bulls	Total	1	0	0	0	0	0	0	0	1	0
New York Red Bulls II (loan)	2016	28	15	4	6	–				32	21
New York Red Bulls II (loan)	2017	15	9	0	0	–				15	9
New York Red Bulls II (loan)	Total	43	24	4	6	0	0	0	0	47	30
Minnesota United (loan)	2017	1	0	0	0	0	0	–		1	0
Minnesota United (loan)	Total	1	0	0	0	0	0	0	0	1	0
Bethlehem Steel	2018	7	2	0	0	–				7	2
Bethlehem Steel	Total	7	2	0	0	0	0	0	0	7	2
Nashville SC	2018	21	8	0	0	3	1	–		24	9
Career total		73	34	4	6	3	1	0	0	80	40

== Honors ==
=== Club ===
New York Red Bulls II

- USL Cup (1): 2016
