= Rafael Díaz (footballer) =

Dominican Republic footballer

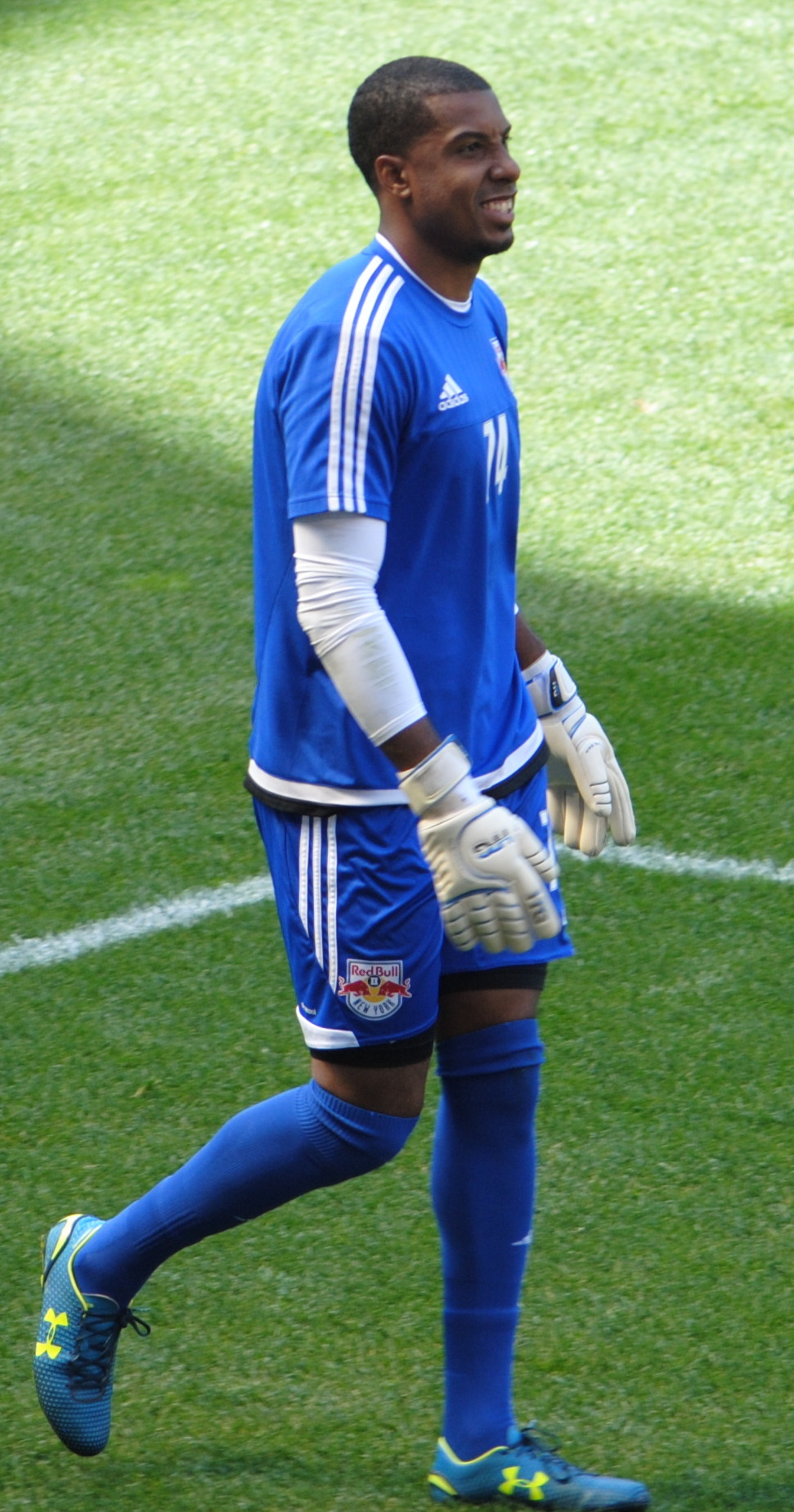

Personal information
- Full name: Rafael Alejandro Díaz, Jr.
- Date of birth: 8 October 1991 (age 35)
- Place of birth: Dominican Republic
- Height: 1.85 m (6 ft 1 in)
- Position: Goalkeeper

College career
Years	Team	Apps	(Gls)
2010–2013	St. John's Red Storm		

Senior career*
Years	Team	Apps	(Gls)
2012	Jersey Express	11	(0)
2013	Brooklyn Italians	12	(0)
2014	Orlando City	0	(0)
2015–2017	New York Red Bulls II	10	(0)
2017	New York Red Bulls	0	(0)
2017	New York Red Bulls II	11	(0)
2018–2021	Sacramento Republic	25	(0)
2022	Monterey Bay	3	(0)

International career^{‡}
2021–	Dominican Republic	4	(0)
- * Club domestic league appearances and goals as of 04:42, 22 March 2022 (UTC) ‡ National team caps and goals as of 5 June 2021

Rafael Alejandro Díaz (born 8 October 1991) is a Dominican professional footballer who plays as a goalkeeper for the Dominican Republic national team.

== Career ==
=== Youth and college ===
Díaz played club soccer for PDA in New Jersey. Díaz also played college soccer for St. John's University from 2010 to 2013. While with the Red Storm he was a four-year starter and made 72 appearances and recorded a school record 32 shutouts.

During his college career Díaz also played with USL PDL side Jersey Express S.C., making 11 appearances as a starter during the 2012 season .

=== Professional ===
Coming out of St. John's Díaz was considered one of top Goalkeeper prospects in the country. On 20 March 2014 Díaz signed his first professional contract with USL Pro side Orlando City SC. Díaz made his first team debut with Orlando on 14 May 2014 coming on as a late game substitute for Carl Woszczynski in a 4-1 U.S. Open Cup victory over Ocala Stampede.

Díaz went on trial with Major League Soccer club New York Red Bulls during the 2015 preseason. He caught the attention of the club and signed with New York Red Bulls II for the 2015 season and made the game day roster for the side in its first ever match on 28 March 2015 which ended in a 0–0 draw with Rochester Rhinos. On 12 April 2015 he made his debut with the club coming on as a late game substitute in a match against Wilmington Hammerheads FC. On 18 April 2015 Díaz made his debut as a starter for New York Red Bulls II in a 1–1 draw against the Charleston Battery.

On 17 April 2016 Díaz made his season debut for New York in a scoreless draw against the defending league champion Rochester Rhinos. His performance that day earned him USL Team of the Week honors.

On 24 January 2017 the New York Red Bulls announced that Díaz had been signed to an MLS contract after two years with the reserve team.

On 6 February 2018 Díaz signed with Sacramento Republic FC for the 2018 season.

On 4 February 2021 Díaz signed with USL Championship expansion team Monterey Bay FC for the 2021 season. Díaz was included in the starting 11 for Monterey Bay's inaugural match, a 4–2 loss to Phoenix Rising FC. His contract option was declined by the club at the end of the season.

== Career statistics ==
As of 22 July 2017

Club	Season	League		Playoffs		US Open Cup		CONCACAF		Total	
Club	Season	Apps	Goals	Apps	Goals	Apps	Goals	Apps	Goals	Apps	Goals
New York Red Bulls II	2015	6	0	0	0	1	0	0	0	7	0
New York Red Bulls II	2016	4	0	0	0	0	0	0	0	4	0
New York Red Bulls II	2017	11	0	0	0	0	0	0	0	11	0
Career total		21	0	0	0	1	0	0	0	22	0

== Honors ==
New York Red Bulls II

- USL Cup: 2016
