= New York Red Bulls Academy =

American soccer team

- Full name: New York Red Bulls Academy
- Nickname: Baby Bulls
- Founded: 2005
- Stadium: Red Bull Training Facility; 24 Melanie Lane; Whippany, New Jersey 07981
- Director: Sean McCafferty
- League: MLS NEXT
Home colors	Away colors

The New York Red Bulls Academy is the multi-layered youth system of the New York Red Bulls. It is the first cost-free program in Major League Soccer that provides a professional soccer training environment for youth players in the New York Tri-State. The soccer programs are operated as part of a global approach to player development.

Through a partnership with Southern New Hampshire University, players are able to pursue their education while continuing to play professionally.

There are several levels which make up the pyramid.

== Leadership ==
=== Director of Coaching Education and Youth Partnerships ===
Robert Montgomery oversees the Red Bulls Player Development System, including the Academy and Grassroots Training Program as Director of Coaching Education and Youth Partnerships. Prior to joining New York Red Bulls, Montgomery was the head men's soccer coach at Adelphi University, where he led the Panthers for 29 seasons. Posting a 258-224-39 record, Montgomery guided a program that had consistently been in the top 25 in the country.

He led seven of his teams to the NCAA tournament, and his 1987 squad advanced to the quarterfinals. Montgomery led the Panthers to their first Atlantic Soccer Conference regular season and tournament titles and received ASC Coach of the Year honors in 2006. He was named NSCAA Regional Coach of the Year in 1987 and 1990 and was selected NCSC Coach of the Year in 1995. Montgomery served as an associate athletic director at Adelphi from 1989 until 2006, where he was responsible for compliance and eligibility for over 250 athletes. In addition to his duties at Adelphi, Montgomery has been an assistant coach for the U14 U.S. Men's National Team since 2000.

Montgomery, who possesses a USSF "A" license, was the 1990 New York State Coach of the Year and Adelphi University Athletic Hall of Fame member became involved with the U.S. Youth Soccer Association in 1985 and coached top players from ages ranging from 12 to 19 in Region I.

=== Academy Director ===
In August 2019, Sean McCafferty was announced as the new Academy Director. A native of Derry, Northern Ireland, McCafferty most recently served as the academy director for the residency program at FC Barca Arizona . He previously spent fifteen years at St. Mirren F.C. in Scotland, where he began as a community coach and worked his way up to Head of Youth Development, overseeing player development and serving as manager of the reserve squad.

=== Senior Manager of Coach Recruitment & Education ===
Marguerite Ferrell hires the coaches whom will engage, inspire and teach the youth. She also manages the coaching curriculum, and ensures compliance with the club philosophy. Ferrell assists the staff in licensing and organizes an in-house coach education program consisting of over 100+ hours a year of coaches education meetings.

== Training program ==
At the base is the training program which serves players at the grassroots level. This takes the form of soccer camps and training sessions available for youth players that want to learn more about the sport in a fun, yet professional setting. The skills clinics provide an easy and fun option for players to receive extra individualized training to help complement their regular club or team-based training sessions. The training programs also serve as a stepping stone to the Regional Development School. The RDS is accessible via tryout only, and acts as the feeder system to Red Bulls Academy teams. Players that excel during a Training Clinic will be invited to try out for the RDS program the following season.

== Regional Development School ==
The Regional Development School operates as a satellite program which offers advanced soccer players the opportunity to develop their game on a supplementary basis, and serves as recruitment tool for the Academy teams.

The RDS offers young boys and girls ages 7 to 14 an opportunity to receive supplementary training from Red Bulls’ professional trainers. Intended solely for competitive and elite travel level soccer players, the advanced curriculum is specially designed to target individual, technical aspects of the game.

The RDS is available year-round, with a variety of programs during the fall, winter, spring, and summer

== The Academy level ==
At the academy level, players are selected to represent Red Bulls teams; where players can ultimately progress to the Red Bulls First Team.

The premier academy teams currently play in MLS Next (until 2020, U.S. Soccer Development Academy), the top tier of youth soccer in the United States. The premier program comprises five teams (U-12, U-13, U-14, U-15, U-16, U-18). Youth players train a minimum of three times a week and play a maximum of two games under the supervision of professional staff. The program is designed to give dedicated and talented players the training and experience needed to reach the highest levels of the game both nationally and internationally.

== USL League Two New York Red Bulls U-23 ==
New York Red Bulls U-23 is an American soccer team based in Harrison, New Jersey. Founded in 2009, the team plays in the USL League Two, a national amateur league at the fourth tier of the American Soccer Pyramid. It is part of the official development academy of Major League Soccer's New York Red Bulls.

The team plays its home games in the stadium at the Red Bull Training Facility in Hanover, New Jersey: Melanie Lane. The team's colors are red, blue and white.

== USL New York Red Bulls II ==
In 2015 the New York Red Bulls second team began play in the USL Championship, the third tier of the American soccer pyramid. New York Red Bulls II completed its inaugural USL season with a 12–10–6 record in fourth place of the Eastern Conference. The team won its first playoff game against Pittsburgh Riverhounds and advanced as far as the Eastern Conference semifinals in the 2015 USL Playoffs.

A team mostly composed of NYRB II players defeated Chelsea F.C. in a 2015 friendly.

In 2016, New York Red Bulls II claimed the USL regular season title, beating the Harrisburg City Islanders 4–1 to clinch the honor with three games to spare.

The win, which was New York's seventh in a row, moved Red Bulls II to an impressive 19-3-5 on the year.

In addition to claiming the league's regular season title in their second season of existence, Red Bulls II, coached by former first-team player John Wolyniec, have already claimed some USL records and are nearing others: they're just one point away from setting the league record for points in a season, and need only three goals in their final three games to break the USL mark for goals.

The team already holds the USL record for road wins in a season and will look to become the third side in league history to win both the regular season and USL championship following the conclusion of the regular season on September 25.

== Academy Products ==
This is a list of former (or current) Red Bull Academy products who have played professionally:

=== Bosnia & Herzegovina ===
- (Bosnia and Herzegovina) Izzy Tandir

=== Colombia ===
- (Colombia) Dan Bedoya

=== Ecuador ===
- (Ecuador) Victor Manosalvas

=== Haiti ===
- (Haiti) Derrick Etienne Jr.
- (Haiti) Andrew Jean-Baptiste

=== Honduras ===
- (Honduras) Franklin Castellanos

=== Malaysia ===
- (Malaysia) Ong Whye Li

=== Nigeria ===
- (Nigeria) Bolu Akinyode

=== Poland ===
- (Poland) Konrad Plewa

=== Puerto Rico ===
- (Puerto Rico) Leonard Aviles Jr

=== United States ===
- (United States) Tyler Adams
- (United States) Sammy Adjei Jr
- (United States) Juan Agudelo
- (United States) Brandon Allen
- (United States) Arun Basuljevic
- (United States) Marcello Borges
- (United States) Russell Canouse
- (United States) Keith Cardona
- (United States) Santiago Castano
- (United States) Mael Corboz
- (United States) Sean Davis
- (United States) Dilly Duka
- (United States) Kyle Duncan
- (United States) Omir Fernandez
- (United States) Bryan Gallego
- (United States) Chris Gloster
- (United States) Kyle Gruno
- (United States) Šaćir Hot
- (United States) Matt Kassel
- (United States) Robert Baggio Kcira
- (United States) Connor Lade
- (United States) Mike Lansing
- (United States) Noah Leeds
- (United States) Dan Metzger
- (United States) Matt Miazga
- (United States) Ben Mines
- (United States) Amando Moreno
- (United States) Alex Muyl
- (United States) David Najem
- (United States) Matthew Olosunde
- (United States) Scott Thomsen
- (United States) Chris Thorsheim
- (United States) Mason Toye
- (United States) Timothy Weah
