= Florian Valot =

French footballer (born 1993)

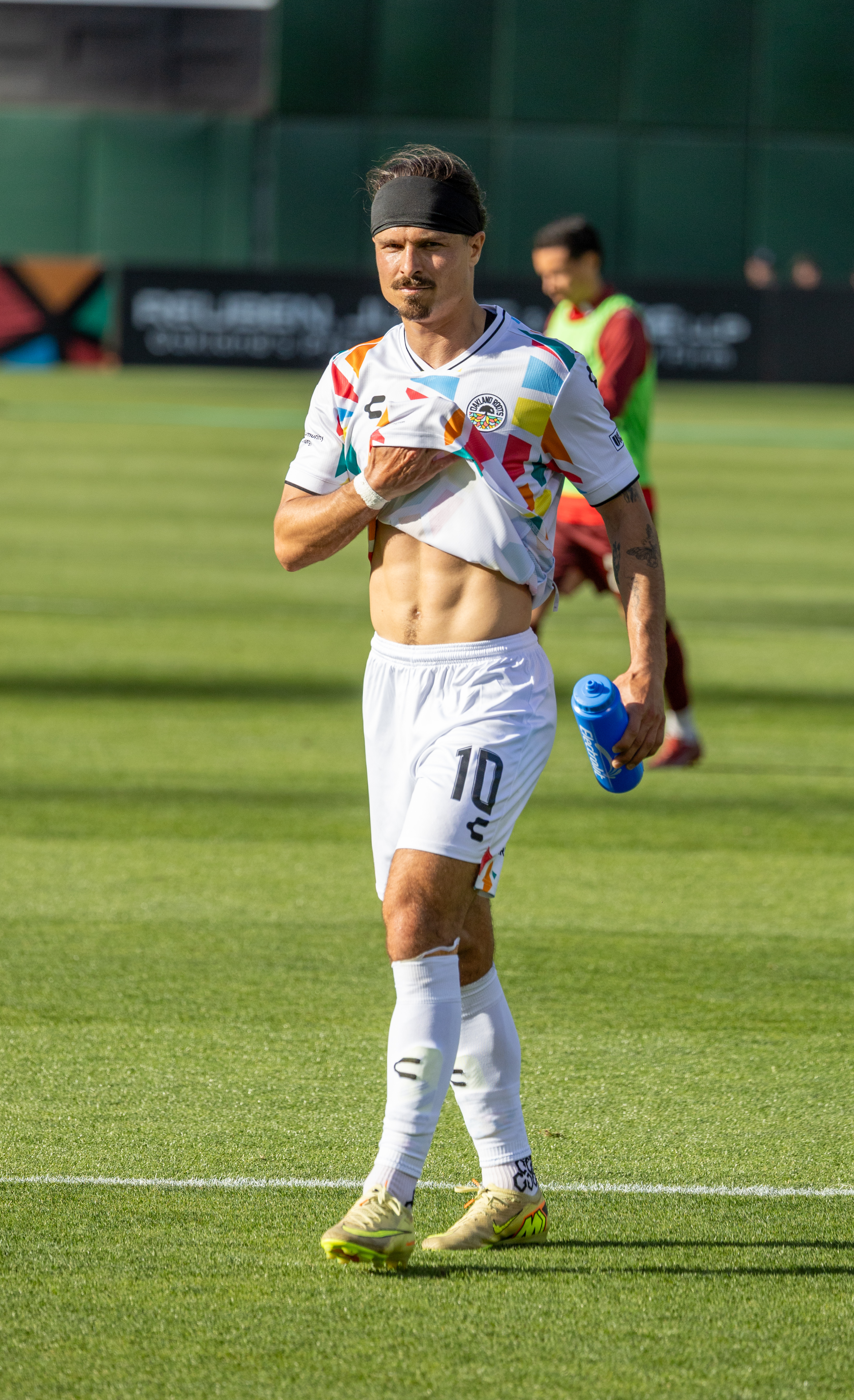
- Valot with the Oakland Roots in 2026

Personal information
- Full name: Florian Valot
- Date of birth: 12 February 1993 (age 33)
- Place of birth: Pau, France
- Height: 5 ft 9 in (1.75 m)
- Position: Midfielder

Team information
- Current team: Oakland Roots
- Number: 10

Youth career
- 2010: Paris Saint-Germain
- 2011–2013: Monaco

College career
| Years | Team | Apps | (Gls) |
| 2014–2015 | Rider Broncs | 34 | (13) |

Senior career*
| Years | Team | Apps | (Gls) |
| 2010–2013 | Monaco II | 27 | (1) |
| 2016–2021 | New York Red Bulls II | 56 | (13) |
| 2018–2021 | New York Red Bulls | 43 | (5) |
| 2021 | FC Cincinnati | 9 | (0) |
| 2022–2023 | Miami FC | 58 | (7) |
| 2024–2025 | Loudoun United | 62 | (6) |
| 2025– | Oakland Roots | 19 | (3) |
- * Club domestic league appearances and goals as of 10:57, 10 November 2026 (UTC)

Florian Valot (born 12 February 1993) is a French professional footballer who plays as a midfielder for USL Championship club Oakland Roots SC.

== Career ==
=== Early career ===
During his youth years, Valot was a member of the Paris Saint-Germain youth system as well as the Monaco's reserve team for three years. In 2014, Valot moved to the United States to attend Rider University on scholarship as a member of their soccer team. During his two years at the school, he appeared in 34 matches tallying 13 goals and six assists.

Valot was a member of the New York Red Bulls II preseason squad as a trialist in 2016 and appeared in three games for their U-23 team.

=== Professional ===
On 25 June 2016, Valot signed with American third division side and New York Red Bulls affiliate club, New York Red Bulls II in the United Soccer League. The following day, Valot made his first appearance with the club in a 4–0 victory against the Wilmington Hammerheads, where he recorded an assist on the second goal of the match. On 19 July 2016, Valot scored his first goal as a professional scoring a late winner in a 2–1 victory over FC Cincinnati. On 16 October 2016, Valot scored the equalizing goal for New York in a 1–1 draw with Louisville City FC, a match in which New York advanced to the 2016 USL Cup Final on PKs, 4–3. The following week Valot helped the club to a 5–1 victory over Swope Park Rangers in the 2016 USL Cup Final.

Valot started the 2017 season as the Captain of New York Red Bulls II, scoring in a 3–3 draw with the Pittsburgh Riverhounds. He ended the season appearing in 32 matches and scoring ten goals and recording seven assists.

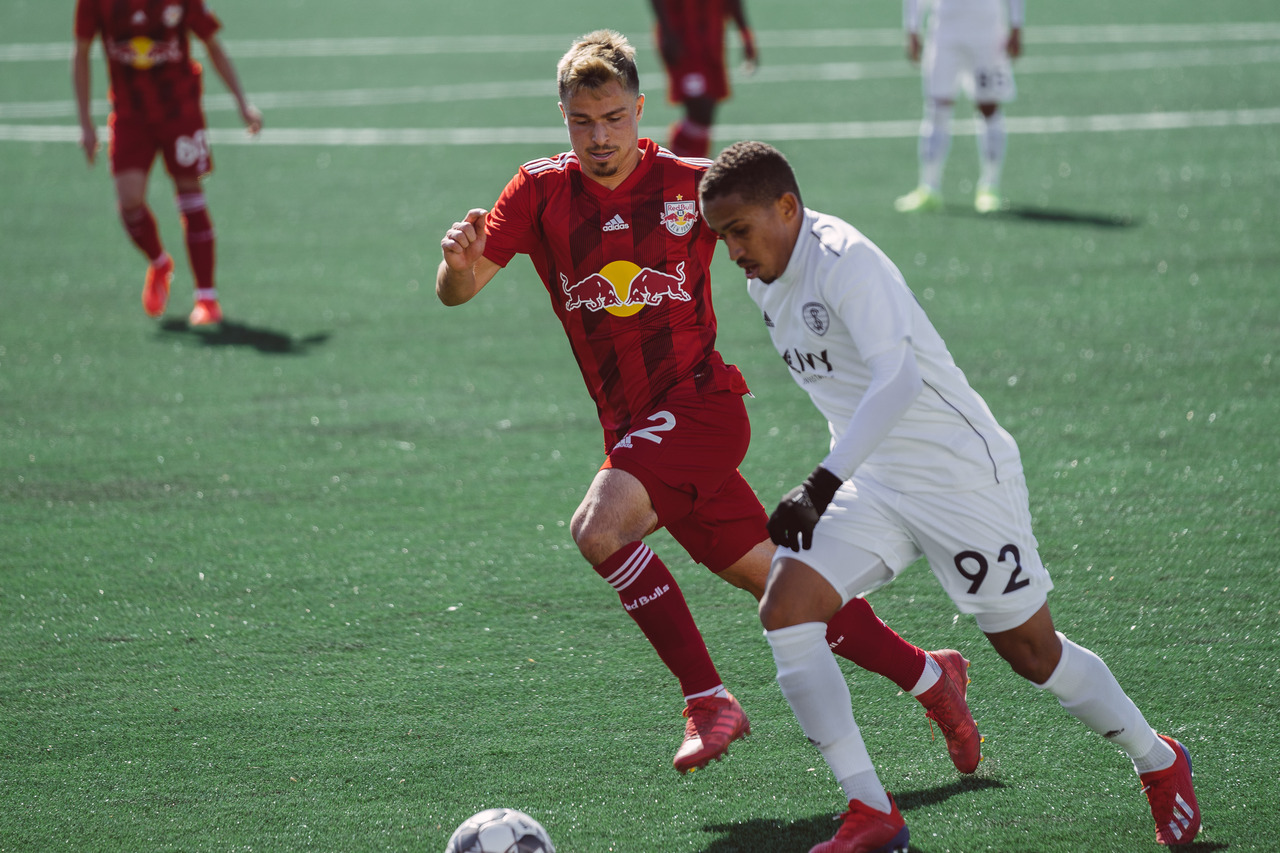
Valot (left) defending for the New York Red Bulls in 2019

Valot moved to New York Red Bulls from the second-team on 20 December 2017. On 6 March 2018 he made his official debut for the first team, recording an assist in a 2–0 victory in Mexico over Tijuana in the CONCACAF Champions League. On 13 March 2018, Valot made his first start for New York in 3–1 victory over Tijuana in the CONCACAF Champions League, helping the club advance to semifinals of the Champions League for the first time.

Valot was sent back on a temporary loan to affiliate side New York Red Bulls II during March 2018. On 17 March 2018, he captained the side in a 2–1 victory over Toronto FC II, assisting Andrew Tinari on the game-winning goal. Valot was recalled to the first team and on 31 March 2018 scored his first goal for New York Red Bulls in a 4–3 loss to Orlando City. On 28 April 2018, Valot scored his second goal of the season, helping New York to a 3–2 victory over Los Angeles Galaxy. On 5 May 2018, Valot recorded a goal and an assist in a 4–0 derby victory over New York City FC. On 8 July 2018, it was announced that Valot had suffered a torn ACL and would be out for the remainder of the season. Prior to the injury Valot had established himself as a starter in his first season with the first team.

Valot made his return to the team at the start of the 2019 season, however, he suffered another ACL injury during the second game of the season causing him to miss the rest of the season. On 1 March 2020, Valot made his return to the lineup, recording two assists to lead New York to a 3–2 victory over FC Cincinnati in the opening match of the 2020 campaign.

On 5 August 2021, Valot was traded to FC Cincinnati in exchange for $50,000 in General Allocation Money, with another $50,000 dependent on performance-based metrics.

On 13 January 2022, Valot signed a two-year contract with Miami FC of the USL Championship.

In January 2024, Loudoun United FC announced they had signed Valot on a one-year contract with an option for a second year. On 13 December 2024, Loudoun extended Valot's contract for the 2025 USL Championship season.

On 17 December 2025, Valot signed a contract with USL championship side Oakland Roots SC.

== Career statistics ==
As of 14 October 2023

| Club | Season | League | | League Cup | | Domestic Cup | | Continental | | Total | |
| Club | Season | Apps | Goals | Apps | Goals | Apps | Goals | Apps | Goals | Apps | Goals |
|---|---|---|---|---|---|---|---|---|---|---|---|
| New York Red Bulls II | 2016 | 17 | 2 | 4 | 1 | 0 | 0 | 0 | 0 | 21 | 3 |
| New York Red Bulls II | 2017 | 29 | 9 | 3 | 1 | 0 | 0 | 0 | 0 | 32 | 10 |
| New York Red Bulls II | 2018 | 1 | 0 | 0 | 0 | 0 | 0 | 0 | 0 | 1 | 0 |
| New York Red Bulls II | 2019 | 1 | 0 | 0 | 0 | 0 | 0 | 0 | 0 | 1 | 0 |
| New York Red Bulls II | 2021 | 1 | 0 | 0 | 0 | 0 | 0 | 0 | 0 | 1 | 0 |
| New York Red Bulls II | Total | 49 | 11 | 7 | 2 | 0 | 0 | 0 | 0 | 56 | 13 |
| New York Red Bulls | 2018 | 14 | 3 | 0 | 0 | 2 | 0 | 4 | 0 | 20 | 3 |
| New York Red Bulls | 2019 | 2 | 0 | 0 | 0 | 0 | 0 | 1 | 0 | 3 | 0 |
| New York Red Bulls | 2020 | 23 | 2 | 1 | 0 | 0 | 0 | 0 | 0 | 24 | 2 |
| New York Red Bulls | 2021 | 3 | 0 | 0 | 0 | 0 | 0 | 0 | 0 | 3 | 0 |
| New York Red Bulls | Total | 42 | 5 | 1 | 0 | 2 | 0 | 5 | 0 | 50 | 5 |
| FC Cincinnati | 2021 | 9 | 0 | 0 | 0 | 0 | 0 | 0 | 0 | 9 | 0 |
| Miami FC | 2022 | 33 | 5 | 1 | 0 | 2 | 0 | 0 | 0 | 36 | 5 |
| Miami FC | 2023 | 25 | 2 | 0 | 0 | 2 | 0 | 0 | 0 | 27 | 2 |
| Miami FC | Total | 58 | 7 | 1 | 0 | 4 | 0 | 0 | 0 | 63 | 7 |
| Career total | | 158 | 23 | 9 | 2 | 6 | 0 | 5 | 0 | 178 | 25 |

== Honors ==
=== Club ===
New York Red Bulls

- USL Cup (1): 2016

New York Red Bulls

- MLS Supporters' Shield (1): 2018
