= Justin Bilyeu =

American soccer player

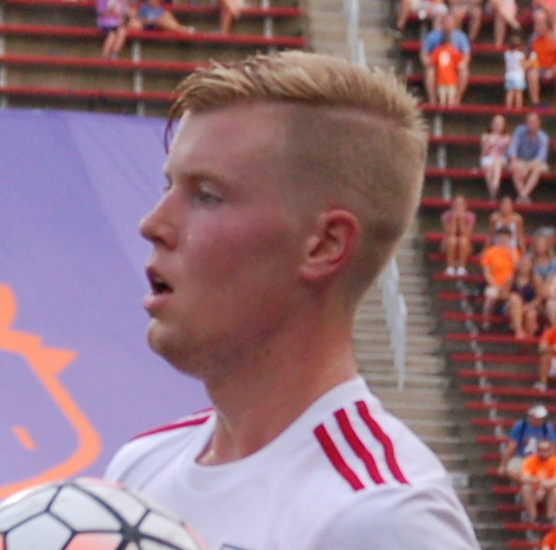
- Bilyeu with New York Red Bulls II in 2016

Personal information
- Full name: Justin Bilyeu
- Date of birth: February 3, 1994 (age 32)
- Place of birth: St. Louis, Missouri, U.S.
- Height: 6 ft 2 in (1.88 m)
- Position: Defender

College career
| Years | Team | Apps | (Gls) |
| 2012–2015 | SIU Edwardsville Cougars | 59 | (5) |

Senior career*
| Years | Team | Apps | (Gls) |
| 2015 | FC Tucson | 7 | (1) |
| 2016–2017 | New York Red Bulls | 4 | (0) |
| 2016–2017 | New York Red Bulls II | 29 | (1) |
| 2017 | Rio Grande Valley FC Toros | 13 | (1) |
| 2018–2019 | Swope Park Rangers | 11 | (0) |
| Total | | 64 | (3) |
- * Club domestic league appearances and goals as of May 8, 2019

Justin Bilyeu (born February 3, 1994) is an American former soccer player who played as a defender.

== Early career ==
Bilyeu attended soccer powerhouse program, Christian Brothers College High School in St. Louis, Missouri where he won a state championship in 2009, and was voted to the all-state team during his senior year. Bilyeu was voted to the inaugural High School All-American All-Star game in 2011. After high school, Bilyeu attended Southern Illinois University Edwardsville where he played in 59 games for the Cougars throughout his four-year career.

In 2015, Bilyeu made seven appearances for Premier Development League club, FC Tucson.

== Professional ==
On January 14, 2016, Bilyeu was selected by the New York Red Bulls in the first round of the 2016 MLS SuperDraft as the 18th pick. After a successful preseason, Bilyeu signed his first professional contract days before the 2016 season on March 3. On April 10, New York loaned Bilyeu to USL affiliate club, New York Red Bulls II. Hours later, Bilyeu made his first appearance with the club, coming on as a second-half substitute in a 4–0 victory against Bethlehem Steel FC.

Bilyeu made his professional debut with the senior team on April 29, during a 4–0 victory against FC Dallas. On June 15, Bilyeu made his first start for the senior team during a 1–0 victory against the Rochester Rhinos in the U.S. Open Cup. On June 26, Bilyeu made his first MLS start in a 2–1 loss to Real Salt Lake. On July 19, in a 2–1 victory over FC Cincinnati with Red Bulls II, Bilyeu scored his first professional goal off a free kick, curling the ball into the lower left corner. Bilyeu was part of the 2016 USL Cup Champion Red Bull II side.

Bilyeu was waived by New York on June 28, 2017.

On August 2, 2017, Bilyeu signed with United Soccer League side Rio Grande Valley FC Toros. Bilyeu led the team with four assists. On October 5, Bilyeu was called up and made his Houston Dynamo debut in a friendly against Liga MX side Cruz Azul.

On March 7, 2018, Bilyeu signed with United Soccer League side Swope Park Rangers. Bilyeu missed all but 10 games during the 2018 campaign due to knee surgery.

On November 30, 2018, Bilyeu resigned with United Soccer League side Swope Park Rangers. However, due to ongoing concussion issues, Bilyeu retired from playing soccer on April 24, 2019.

== Career statistics ==
As of April 24, 2019

Appearances and goals by club, season and competition
| Club | Season | League | | MLS Cup/Playoffs | | US Open Cup | | CONCACAF | | Total | |
| Club | Season | Apps | Goals | Apps | Goals | Apps | Goals | Apps | Goals | Apps | Goals |
|---|---|---|---|---|---|---|---|---|---|---|---|
| New York Red Bulls | 2016 | 3 | 0 | 0 | 0 | 2 | 0 | 3 | 0 | 8 | 0 |
| New York Red Bulls | 2017 | 1 | 0 | 0 | 0 | 0 | 0 | 1 | 0 | 2 | 0 |
| New York Red Bulls | Total | 4 | 0 | 0 | 0 | 2 | 0 | 4 | 0 | 10 | 0 |
| New York Red Bulls II (loan) | 2016 | 15 | 1 | 0 | 0 | 0 | 0 | 0 | 0 | 15 | 1 |
| New York Red Bulls II (loan) | 2017 | 14 | 0 | 0 | 0 | 0 | 0 | 0 | 0 | 14 | 0 |
| New York Red Bulls II (loan) | Total | 29 | 1 | 0 | 0 | 0 | 0 | 0 | 0 | 29 | 1 |
| Career total | | 33 | 1 | 0 | 0 | 2 | 0 | 4 | 0 | 39 | 1 |
