= Derrick Etienne Jr. =

Haitian footballer (born 1996)

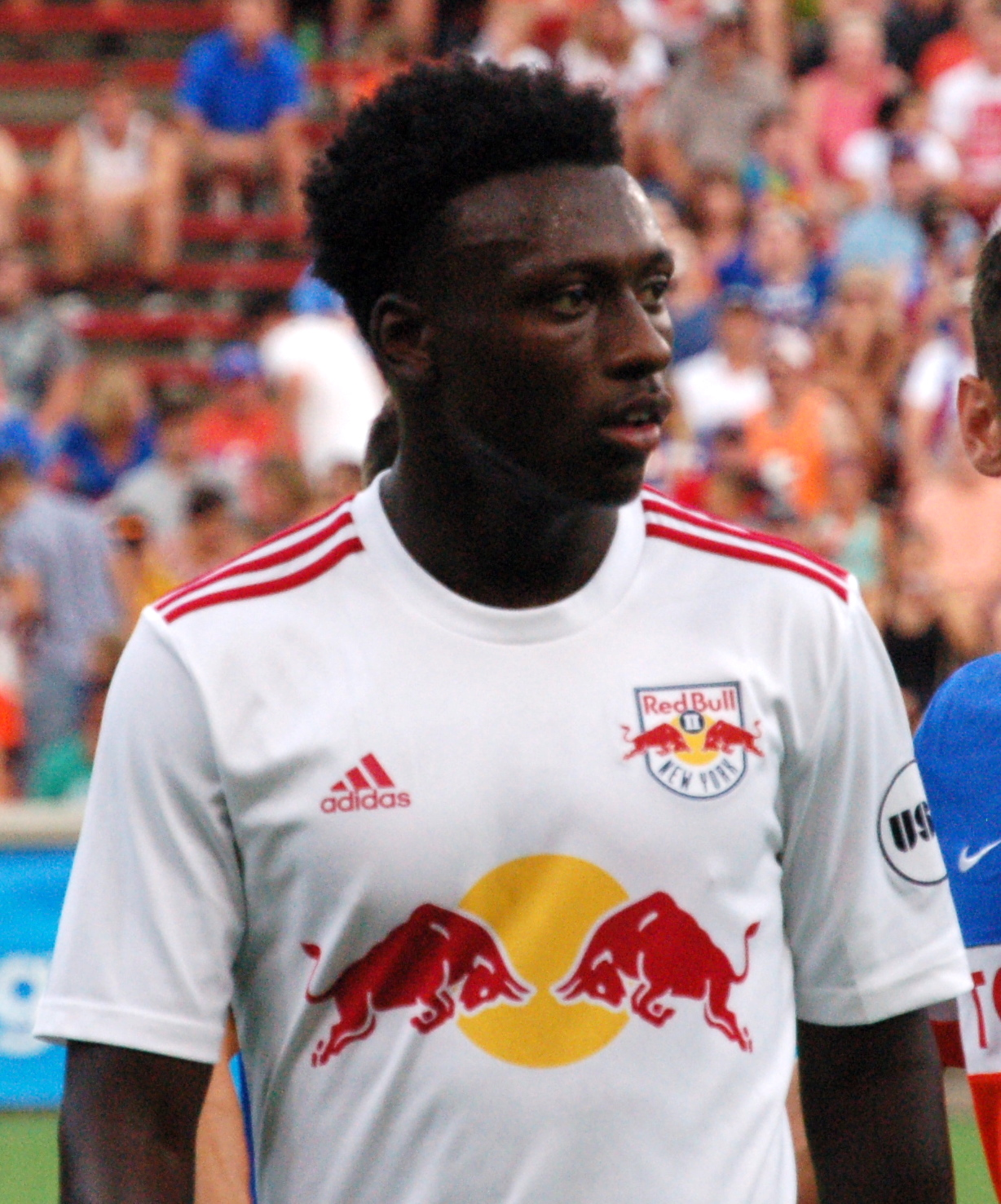
- Etienne with New York Red Bulls II in 2016

Personal information
- Full name: Derrick Burckley Etienne Jr.
- Date of birth: 25 November 1996 (age 29)
- Place of birth: Richmond, Virginia, United States
- Height: 1.79 m (5 ft 10 in)
- Position: Winger

Team information
- Current team: Toronto FC
- Number: 11

Youth career
- 2009–2015: New York Red Bulls

College career
Years	Team	Apps	(Gls)
2015	Virginia Cavaliers	17	(2)

Senior career*
Years	Team	Apps	(Gls)
2015	New York Red Bulls II	14	(3)
2016–2019	New York Red Bulls	60	(6)
2016–2019	→ New York Red Bulls II (loan)	38	(10)
2019	→ FC Cincinnati (loan)	5	(0)
2020–2022	Columbus Crew	83	(11)
2023–2024	Atlanta United FC	23	(0)
2023–2024	→ Atlanta United 2 (loan)	3	(0)
2024–	Toronto FC	74	(7)

International career^{‡}
2013	Haiti U17	1	(0)
2015	Haiti U20	3	(0)
2015	Haiti U23	1	(0)
2016–	Haiti	52	(8)
- * Club domestic league appearances and goals as of 7 November 2026 ‡ National team caps and goals as of 23:57, 19 June 2026 (UTC)

Derrick Burckley Etienne Jr. (born 25 November 1996) is a professional footballer who plays as a winger for Toronto FC in Major League Soccer. Born in the United States, he plays for the Haiti national team.

Born in Richmond, Virginia, and raised in Paterson, New Jersey, Etienne is the son of former Haitian international and Long Island Rough Riders forward Derrick Etienne, and the older brother of fellow Haitian international midfielder Danielle Etienne.

== Early career ==
=== High school ===
Etienne was born in Virginia (where his father Derrick Sr. played for the Richmond Kickers) before moving to Paterson, New Jersey where he spent his childhood. He attended high school at Passaic County Technical Institute in Wayne, New Jersey, playing varsity soccer for the Bulldogs in his freshman year with 6 goals and 9 assists. He helped lead the team to the state Vo-Tech tournament and the Big North Conference Liberty division titles. Etienne ended his high school playing career to focus on the Red Bulls Academy following the season.

=== College career ===
Etienne spent his youth club career with the New York Red Bulls Academy. Etienne joined the academy in 2009 at the U-14 level at age 12. While being one of the youngest players on the team, Etienne progressed and stood out at the U14, U15, U16, and U18 levels before signing a letter of intent to play college soccer at the University of Virginia. Despite appearing for NYRB II, Etienne was able to maintain his college eligibility and on 29 August 2015, he made his collegiate debut for the Cavaliers in a 1–0 victory over UNC Charlotte. On 21 September 2015, Etienne scored his first collegiate goal in a 1–0 victory over his father's alma mater, VCU. Later that same year, Etienne chose not to complete his degree at Virginia, and signed a pro contract.

== Professional ==
=== New York Red Bulls ===
On 28 March 2015, Etienne made his professional debut for USL affiliate club New York Red Bulls II in a 0–0 draw against the Rochester Rhinos. On 24 May 2015 Etienne scored his first professional goal and assisted on another, helping New York to a 3–2 victory over FC Montreal. For this performance Etienne was named to the USL team of the Week. On 30 May 2015 Etienne scored his second professional goal for New York in a 4–2 loss to his father's former club, Richmond Kickers. On 20 June 2015 Etienne scored for New York in a 2–0 victory over Louisville City FC.

On 21 December 2015, Etienne signed a Homegrown Contract with the New York Red Bulls, forgoing his remaining NCAA eligibility. Etienne was loaned back to Red Bulls II in 2016 for their home opener on 26 March. On 10 April 2016 Etienne scored his first goal of the season, helping New York Red Bulls II to a 4–0 victory over Bethlehem Steel FC. On 7 May 2016 Etienne scored his second goal of the season in 3–1 victory over Pittsburgh Riverhounds. On 23 October 2016 Etienne opened the scoring for New York and also recorded an assist in a 5–1 victory over Swope Park Rangers in the 2016 USL Cup Final.

On 28 May 2017, Etienne scored his first goal of the season for New York Red Bulls II, scoring the game winner on a free kick in a 2–1 victory over Charleston Battery. On 19 July 2017, Etienne recorded his first assist for the first team finding Daniel Royer as he scored New York's fourth goal of the day in a 5–1 victory over San Jose Earthquakes.

On 31 March 2018 Etienne scored his first goal for the New York Red Bulls in a 4–3 loss to Orlando City SC. On 5 May 2018, Etienne scored the last goal for New York in a 4–0 derby victory over New York City FC. The following week, on 12 May Etienne scored New York's second goal in a 2–1 victory over Colorado Rapids. On 28 October 2018, Etienne scored the game-winning goal as the Red Bulls clinched their third Supporters Shield in a 1–0 win over Orlando City SC.

On 8 August 2019, Etienne was loaned to MLS side FC Cincinnati for the remainder of the 2019 season, where he scored zero goals in five appearances.

Etienne was released by New York at the end of their 2019 season.

=== Columbus Crew ===
Following his release from New York Red Bulls, Etienne moved to Columbus Crew on 4 February 2020. He scored the second goal in the Crew's 3–0 victory over Seattle Sounders FC in MLS Cup 2020, which saw the club win their second league championship. On 26 October 2022, Columbus Crew released Etienne, making him a free agent.

=== Atlanta United FC ===
On 30 November 2022, Atlanta United FC announced that they signed Etienne to a contract through 2025, with options for 2026 and 2027.

== International career ==
Though born and raised in the United States, Etienne chose to represent Haiti in international competition, becoming the third member of his family to do so after his father and uncle. He was a member of the Haiti Under-17 team that competed in the 2013 CONCACAF U-17 Championship in Panama as well as the Haiti Under-20 team that competed in the 2015 CONCACAF U-20 Championship in Jamaica.

On 9 November 2016, he made his first senior team appearance for Haiti, coming on as a substitute in a 5–2 loss to French Guiana in the third round of 2017 Caribbean Cup qualification. He scored his first international goal on 8 January 2017 against Trinidad and Tobago in the 2017 Caribbean Cup qualification fifth place playoff.

In the summer of 2019, Etienne competed in the 2019 CONCACAF Gold Cup helping Haiti win Group B after defeating Bermuda, Nicaragua, and Costa Rica to advance to the knockout stage. After upsetting Canada 3–2 in the quarter-final match, Haiti advanced to the semifinals of the Gold Cup for the first time in national team history but fell short in a 1–0 loss to Mexico after extra time.

On 15 May 2026, he was included in Haiti head coach Sébastien Migné's 26-man squad for the 2026 FIFA World Cup.

== Career statistics ==
=== Club ===
As of match played 7 November 2026

Appearances and goals by club, season and competition
Club	Season	League			Playoffs		National cup (Note: Includes U.S. Open Cup and Canadian Championship)		Continental		Other		Total	
Club	Season	Division	Apps	Goals	Apps	Goals	Apps	Goals	Apps	Goals	Apps	Goals	Apps	Goals
New York Red Bulls II	2015	USL Championship	14	3	0	0	1	0	—		—		15	3
New York Red Bulls II	2016	USL Championship	24	5	4	2	—		—		—		28	7
New York Red Bulls II	2017	USL Championship	8	1	0	0	—		—		—		8	1
New York Red Bulls II	2018	USL Championship	2	1	0	0	—		—		—		2	1
New York Red Bulls II	2019	USL Championship	4	3	0	0	—		—		—		4	3
New York Red Bulls II	Total		52	13	4	2	1	0	—		—		57	15
New York Red Bulls	2016	Major League Soccer	1	0	0	0	0	0	2 (Note: Appearances in CONCACAF Champions League)	0	—		3	0
New York Red Bulls	2017	Major League Soccer	18	0	1	0	1	0	2	0	—		22	0
New York Red Bulls	2018	Major League Soccer	30	5	4	0	2	0	5	0	—		41	5
New York Red Bulls	2019	Major League Soccer	11	1	0	0	—		2	0	—		13	1
New York Red Bulls	Total		60	6	5	0	3	0	11	0	0	0	79	6
FC Cincinnati (loan)	2019	Major League Soccer	5	0	—		—		—		—		5	0
Columbus Crew	2020	Major League Soccer	21 (Note: Includes three appearances in MLS is Back Tournament group stage)	1	2	1	—		—		1 (Note: Appearance in MLS is Back Tournament knockout stage)	0	24	2
Columbus Crew	2021	Major League Soccer	29	1	—		—		2	0	1 (Note: Appearance in Campeones Cup)	0	32	1
Columbus Crew	2022	Major League Soccer	33	9	—		1	0	—		—		34	9
Columbus Crew	Total		83	11	2	1	1	0	2	0	2	0	90	12
Atlanta United FC	2023	Major League Soccer	21	0	2	0	1	0	—		1 (Note: Appearance(s) in Leagues Cup)	0	25	0
Atlanta United FC	2024	Major League Soccer	2	0	—		—		—		—		2	0
Atlanta United FC	Total		23	0	2	0	1	0	—		1	0	27	0
Toronto FC	2024	Major League Soccer	23	3	—		4	1	—		3	1	30	5
Toronto FC	2025	Major League Soccer	25	0	—		0	0	—		—		25	0
Toronto FC	2026	Major League Soccer	26	4	—		1	0	—		—		27	4
Toronto FC	Total		74	7	—		5	1	—		3	1	82	9
Career total			297	37	13	3	11	1	13	0	6	1	340	42

=== International ===
As of match played 19 June 2026

Appearances and goals by national team and year
National team	Year	Apps	Goals
Haiti	2016	2	0
Haiti	2017	5	1
Haiti	2018	4	2
Haiti	2019	13	0
Haiti	2020	0	0
Haiti	2021	9	2
Haiti	2022	5	2
Haiti	2023	7	1
Haiti	2024	1	0
Haiti	2025	2	0
Haiti	2026	4	0
Total		52	8

Scores and results list Haiti's goal tally first, score column indicates score after each Etienne goal.

List of international goals scored by Derrick Etienne Jr.
No.	Date	Venue	Opponent	Score	Result	Competition
1	8 January 2017	Ato Boldon Stadium, Couva, Trinidad and Tobago	Trinidad and Tobago	1–1	4–3	2017 CONCACAF Gold Cup qualification
2	10 September 2018	Stade Sylvio Cator, Port-au-Prince, Haiti	Sint Maarten	10–0	13–0	2019–20 CONCACAF Nations League qualifying
3	17 November 2018	Nicaragua National Football Stadium, Managua, Nicaragua	Nicaragua	2–0	2–0	2019–20 CONCACAF Nations League qualifying
4	8 June 2021	Stade Sylvio Cator, Port-au-Prince, Haiti	Nicaragua	1–0	1–0	2022 FIFA World Cup qualification
5	2 July 2021	DRV PNK Stadium, Fort Lauderdale, United States	Saint Vincent and the Grenadines	3–0	6–1	2021 CONCACAF Gold Cup qualification
6	11 June 2022	Synthetic Track and Field Facility, Leonara, Guyana	Guyana	4–1	6–2	2022–23 CONCACAF Nations League B
7	11 June 2022	Synthetic Track and Field Facility, Leonara, Guyana	Guyana	5–1	6–2	2022–23 CONCACAF Nations League B
8	25 March 2023	Blakes Estate Stadium, Lookout, Montserrat	Montserrat	3–0	4–0	2022–23 CONCACAF Nations League B

== Honours ==
New York Red Bulls II

- USL Cup: 2016

New York Red Bulls

- Supporters' Shield: 2018

Columbus Crew

- MLS Cup: 2020
- Campeones Cup: 2021

== Filmography ==
=== Television ===
Year	Title	Role	Notes	References
2022	Welcome to Flatch	Himself	1 episode	
