= 2009–10 1. FC Kaiserslautern season =

1. FC Kaiserslautern
2009–10 season

During the 2009–10 German football season, 1. FC Kaiserslautern competed in the 2. Bundesliga.

== Players ==
=== First-team squad ===
Squad at end of season

Note: Flags indicate national team as defined under FIFA eligibility rules; some limited exceptions apply. Players may hold more than one non-FIFA nationality.

No.	Pos.	Nation	Player
1	GK	GER	Tobias Sippel
2	DF	BFA	Moussa Ouattara
3	MF	BIH	Dario Damjanović
4	MF	GER	Bastian Schulz
5	DF	GER	Martin Amedick
6	DF	GER	Mathias Abel
7	DF	GER	Dragan Paljić
8	MF	GER	Sidney Sam (on loan from Hamburg)
9	FW	CRO	Srđan Lakić
11	MF	GER	Danny Fuchs
13	MF	GER	Mario Klinger
14	DF	GER	Manuel Hornig
15	MF	CMR	Georges Mandjeck (on loan from Stuttgart)
17	DF	GER	Alexander Bugera
18	DF	GER	Christoph Buchner
19	DF	CZE	Jiří Bílek

No.	Pos.	Nation	Player
20	DF	BRA	Rodnei (on loan from Hertha)
21	MF	GER	Pierre de Wit
22	MF	CRO	Ivo Iličević (Note: Iličević was born in Aschaffenburg, West Germany (now Germany), but also qualified to represent Croatia internationally and represented Croatia at U-21 level before making his international debut for Croatia in October 2010.) (on loan from Bochum)
23	DF	GER	Florian Dick
25	DF	SUI	Daniel Pavlović (Note: Pavlović was born in Rorschach, Switzerland, and represented Switzerland at U-19, U-20 and U-21 level, but also qualified to represent Bosnia and Herzegovina internationally and made his international debut for Bosnia and Herzegovina in March 2017.) (on loan from Schaffhausen)
26	FW	SVK	Erik Jendrišek
27	GK	AUT	Marco Knaller
28	DF	GER	Marcel Correia
29	GK	GER	Kevin Trapp
30	DF	GER	Fabian Müller
31	FW	GER	Alper Akçam
32	FW	SVK	Adam Nemec
33	MF	GER	Markus Steinhöfer (on loan from Eintracht Frankfurt)
35	GK	USA	Luis Robles
38	DF	GER	Sascha Kotysch
