= 2008–09 1. FC Kaiserslautern season =

1. FC Kaiserslautern
2008–09 season
- Chairman: Stefan Kuntz
- Manager: Milan Šašić (until 4 May); Alois Schwartz (from 4 May)
- Stadium: Fritz-Walter-Stadion
- 2. Bundesliga: 7th
- DFB-Pokal: First round
- Top goalscorer: Erik Jendrišek (14)
Home colours	Away colours

During the 2008–09 German football season, 1. FC Kaiserslautern competed in the 2. Bundesliga.

== Season summary ==
Although Kaiserslautern's form improved, 7th place was still too far away from promotion for the board's liking, and manager Milan Šašić departed in early May, days after a 1–5 defeat to Hansa Rostock. 1. FC Kaiserslautern II manager Alois Schwartz acted as caretaker for the remainder of the season. Marco Kurz was hired as his permanent replacement.

== Kit ==
The kit was manufactured by Italian company Kapppa and sponsored by Frankfurt-based financial advisors Deutsche Vermögensberatung.

== Players ==
=== First-team squad ===
Squad at end of season

Note: Flags indicate national team as defined under FIFA eligibility rules; some limited exceptions apply. Players may hold more than one non-FIFA nationality.

No.	Pos.	Nation	Player
1	GK	GER	Tobias Sippel
2	DF	BFA	Moussa Ouattara
3	MF	BIH	Dario Damjanović
4	DF	GER	Christopher Lamprecht (on loan from Wolfsburg)
5	DF	GER	Martin Amedick
6	DF	GER	Mathias Abel
7	MF	GER	Sebastian Reinert
8	MF	GER	Sidney Sam (on loan from Hamburg)
9	FW	CRO	Srđan Lakić
10	MF	GER	Anel Džaka (Note: Džaka was born in Sarajevo, SFR Yugoslavia (now Bosnia and Herzegovina), but also qualified to represent Germany internationally and represented Germany at U-21 level.)
11	MF	GER	Danny Fuchs
13	MF	GER	Mario Klinger
14	DF	GER	Manuel Hornig
15	MF	CAN	Josh Simpson
16	MF	GER	Axel Bellinghausen (captain)

No.	Pos.	Nation	Player
17	DF	GER	Alexander Bugera
19	DF	CZE	Jiří Bílek
20	DF	GER	Dragan Paljić
21	DF	TUN	Aïmen Demai (Note: Demai was born in Thionville, France, but also qualified to represent Tunisia and Algeria internationally through his mother and father respectively and made his international debut for Algeria in 2003 before making his international debut for Tunisia in February 2009.)
22	MF	ROU	Laurențiu Reghecampf
23	DF	GER	Florian Dick
24	FW	GER	Kai Hesse
25	MF	BIH	Said Husejinović (on loan from Werder Bremen)
26	FW	SVK	Erik Jendrišek
29	GK	GER	Kevin Trapp
30	DF	GER	Fabian Müller
31	FW	GER	Alper Akçam
35	GK	USA	Luis Robles
37	MF	GER	Ricky Pinheiro
38	DF	GER	Sascha Kotysch

=== Left club during season ===
Note: Flags indicate national team as defined under FIFA eligibility rules; some limited exceptions apply. Players may hold more than one non-FIFA nationality.

No. / Pos. / Nation / Player; 11 / FW / GER / Marcel Ziemer (to Wehen Wiesbaden)	No. / Pos. / Nation / Player; 34 / DF / GER / Fabian Schönheim (to Wehen Wiesbaden)

== Competitions ==
Win Draw Loss Postponed

=== 2. Bundesliga ===
==== League table ====
Pos	Team	Pld	W	D	L	GF	GA	GD	Pts
5	Greuther Fürth	34	16	8	10	60	46	+14	56
6	MSV Duisburg	34	14	13	7	56	36	+20	55
7	1. FC Kaiserslautern	34	15	7	12	53	48	+5	52
8	FC St. Pauli	34	14	6	14	52	59	−7	48
9	Rot-Weiß Oberhausen	34	11	9	14	35	54	−19	42

Source: kicker
Rules for classification: 1) points; 2) goal difference; 3) number of goals scored.
