= Luis Robles =

American soccer player (born 1984)

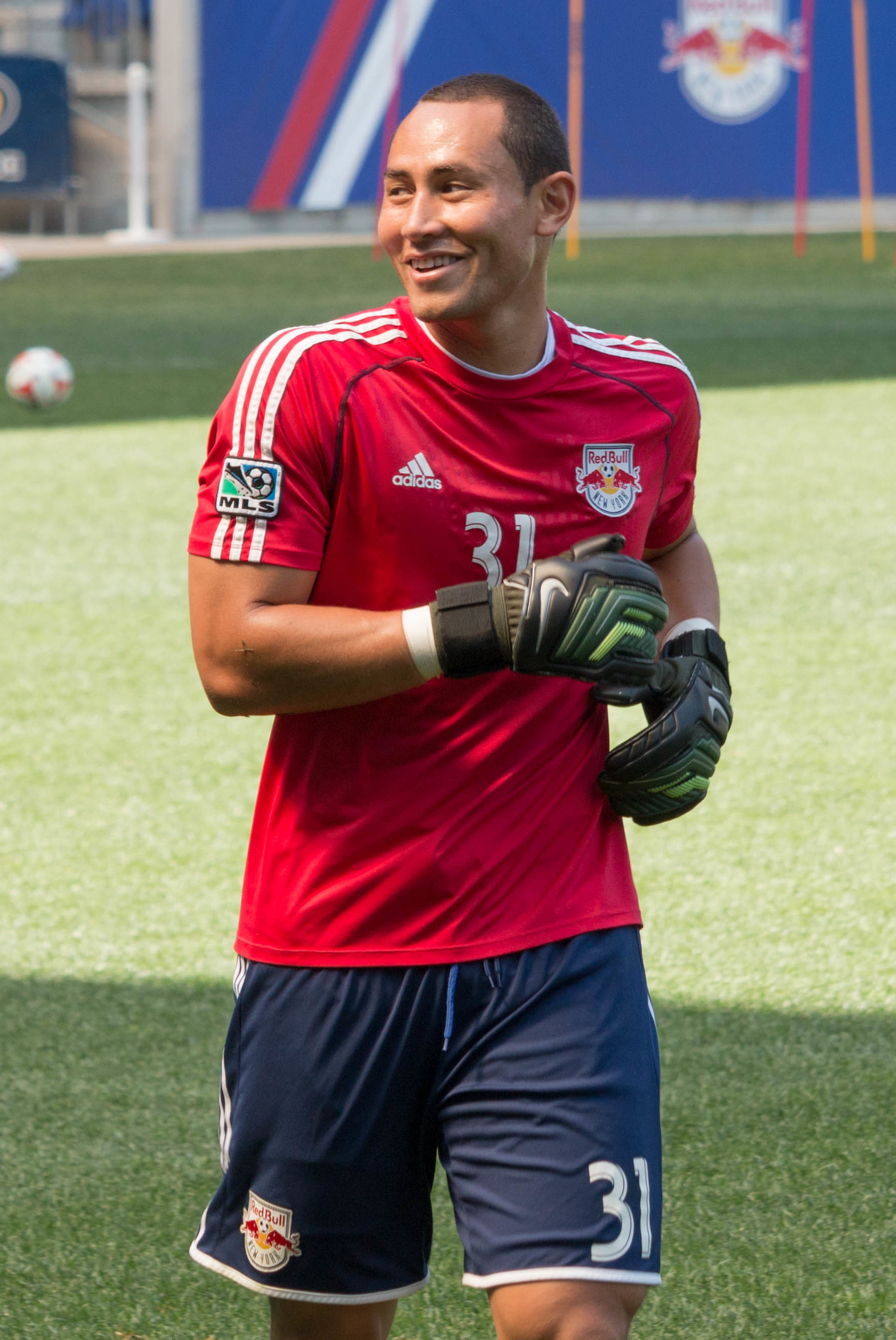
- Robles with the New York Red Bulls in 2014

Personal information
- Full name: Luis Angel Robles
- Date of birth: May 11, 1984 (age 42)
- Place of birth: Fort Huachuca, Arizona, United States
- Height: 5 ft 11 in (1.80 m)
- Position: Goalkeeper

College career
Years	Team	Apps	(Gls)
2003–2006	Portland Pilots	78	(0)

Senior career*
Years	Team	Apps	(Gls)
2003–2004	Boulder Rapids Reserve	27	(0)
2007–2008	1. FC Kaiserslautern II	15	(0)
2008–2010	1. FC Kaiserslautern	21	(0)
2010–2012	Karlsruher SC	28	(0)
2012–2019	New York Red Bulls	238	(0)
2020	Inter Miami CF	15	(0)
Total		344	(0)

International career
2009–2017	United States	3	(0)
Medal record
Representing United States
Men's Soccer
FIFA Confederations Cup
Runner-up	2009 South Africa	Team
CONCACAF Gold Cup
Runner-up	2009 United States	Team
- * Club domestic league appearances and goals

Luis Angel Robles (born May 11, 1984) is an American former professional soccer player who played as a goalkeeper. Robles holds the Major League Soccer record for most consecutive regular-season starts with 183, spanning September 2012 to May 2018.

== Early career ==
Born in Fort Huachuca, Arizona to a Puerto Rican father and a Korean mother, Robles got his start at the prestigious Tucson Soccer Academy, training under the guidance of coach Wolfgang Weber. From 2003 to 2006, Robles played for the University of Portland Pilots, making a school-record 346 saves during his college career. He also played two seasons for the Boulder Rapids Reserve in the USL Premier Development League.

== Professional career ==
=== 1. FC Kaiserslautern ===
Robles was drafted by Major League Soccer club D.C. United with the 50th overall selection in the 2007 MLS SuperDraft. However, he passed up MLS and signed instead with German side Kaiserslautern in January 2007. Robles made his league debut on October 17, 2008, against Rot Weiss Ahlen. He was thrust into the starting role due to an injury to incumbent starter Tobias Sippel and outperformed fellow backup and German youth international Kevin Trapp. In his first season of German soccer he finished the season with sixteen games played and conceded seventeen goals. Robles missed much of the summer training with Kaiserslautern – which had recently hired a new manager, Marco Kurz – because of his inclusion in the United States squad at the 2009 CONCACAF Gold Cup. As a result, he entered the 2009–10 season as the backup once again.

=== Karlsruher SC ===
After making few appearances in 2009–10, which saw Kaiserslautern promoted for the 2010–11 Fußball-Bundesliga season, Robles signed a two-year deal with 2. Fußball-Bundesliga club Karlsruher SC. In his first year with Karlsruhe he appeared in twenty-three games as the club's starting goalkeeper. In 2011–12, he appeared in five league matches and was released by the club at the end of the season.

=== New York Red Bulls ===
On August 8, 2012, Robles was acquired by the New York Red Bulls through Major League Soccer's Allocation Process. Before signing with the club, Robles contemplated retiring from soccer after his offer with Vancouver Whitecaps FC fell through. Once he heard that the offer failed, he took a job with a realtor in order to receive healthcare for his pregnant wife. A few weeks later, Robles made contact with the league office and Ali Curtis who entered him in the Allocation draft, where he eventually signed with the Red Bulls. Robles made his debut for New York, starting against Toronto FC on September 29, 2012, a game in which the Red Bulls won 4–1. After first choice goalkeeper Ryan Meara suffered a hip injury, Robles was named the starter for the final four matches as well as the 2012 MLS Cup Playoffs.

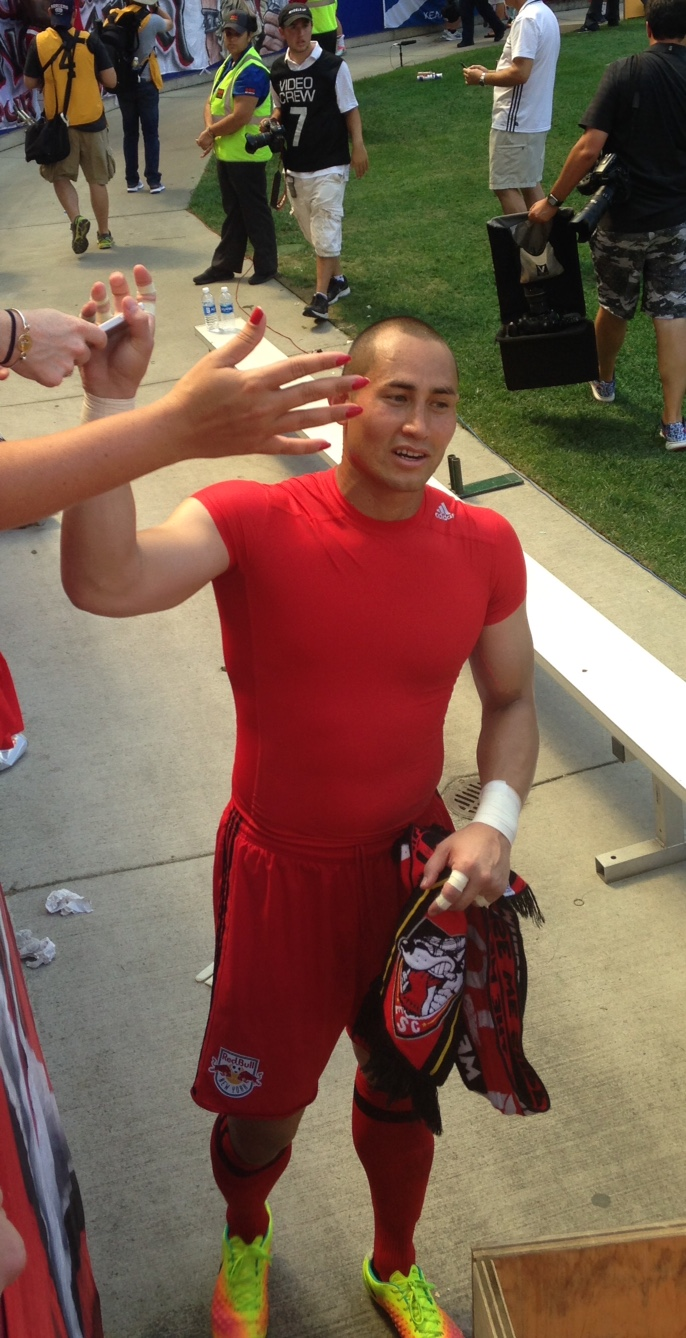
Robles celebrating with the Southward in 2016

Robles cemented his position as the club's starting goalkeeper during the 2013 season as he started all 34 league matches and received praises from star midfielder, Tim Cahill about his fearlessness and desire to succeed. His strong performances in goal throughout the season led New York to the MLS Supporters' Shield - their first ever trophy. For the second year in a row, Robles started all 34 league matches, and led his team to the 2014 Eastern Conference Finals where they ultimately fell to the New England Revolution 4–3 on aggregate. Robles' was awarded with the MLS Save of the Year for his double save against Seattle Sounders FC on September 20.

After the controversial firing of head coach Mike Petke in January 2015, Robles attended a town hall meeting for season ticket holders with newly appointed Sporting Director, Ali Curtis and head coach, Jesse Marsch. Robles volunteered to attend the meeting to be a voice for the players and to calm the nerves of the supporters. On September 20, 2015, Robles helped New York to a 2–0 victory over Portland Timbers, earning his ninth shutout of the season, and 28th of his MLS career, adding to the club record he set earlier in the season. In this match Robles also became the only player in league history to make 100 consecutive starts for the same club. In a 1–0 playoff victory against D.C. United, Robles became the club's all-time leader for career shutouts with 31. Robles was awarded the 2015 MLS Goalkeeper of the Year Award on November 19, 2015.

During the 2016 pre-season, it was announced that Robles had signed a multi-year contract extension with the club. As per MLS regulations the details of the contract were not disclosed. At the conclusion of the Red Bulls 2–1 loss to the Colorado Rapids on April 16, 2016, Robles became the MLS' new Ironman, by setting a new record of playing 90 minutes in 113 consecutive matches. During the Red Bulls next home match on April 25, previous record holder Kevin Hartman awarded Robles with the Ironman trophy. On April 29, 2016, Robles helped New York to a 4–0 victory against FC Dallas recording his first shutout of the season. During a 6-game span in from May 13 to June 22, Robles helped the Red Bulls shut out opponents for 472 consecutive minutes; a streak that would come to an end in a 2–1 defeat to Real Salt Lake. In June 2016, Robles received an ESPY nomination for MLS Player of the Year. On June 25, Robles made his 140th appearance with the club, tying him with Tony Meola and Roy Miller for tenth all-time in club history. On August 16, Robles made his CONCACAF Champions League debut in a 1–1 draw against Alianza F.C. in El Salvador.

On March 11, 2017, Robles set an MLS record for consecutive league starts with 142. Robles has started every league game with the club since his first appearance on September 29, 2012. Robles became the first player in club history to record 50 clean sheets on April 15, 2017, after a 2–0 victory against rivals D.C. United. On October 25, Robles became the club's all-time appearance leader with 199, surpassing former captain, Dax McCarty. The following weekend on October 30, he became the first player in team history to make 200 appearances for the club across all competitions.

Before the start of the 2018 season, Robles was named as the club's new captain by coach Jesse Marsch. On March 1, Robles recorded a clean-sheet in a 2–0 victory over Olimpia in the CONCACAF Champions League; helping New York advance to the Champions League Quarterfinals for the second time in club history. On March 6, Robles recorded a career high 13 saves to lead New York to a 2–0 victory in Mexico over Club Tijuana in the CONCACAF Champions League. After an injury against the Colorado Rapids, Robles was forced to sit out the next match, ending the MLS Ironman streak, and setting a new league record of 183 consecutive matches played. Robles recorded his career-high 14th shutout of the season in a 1–0 victory against Orlando City SC on October 28. The win also helped New York win their third Supporters' Shield in six years.

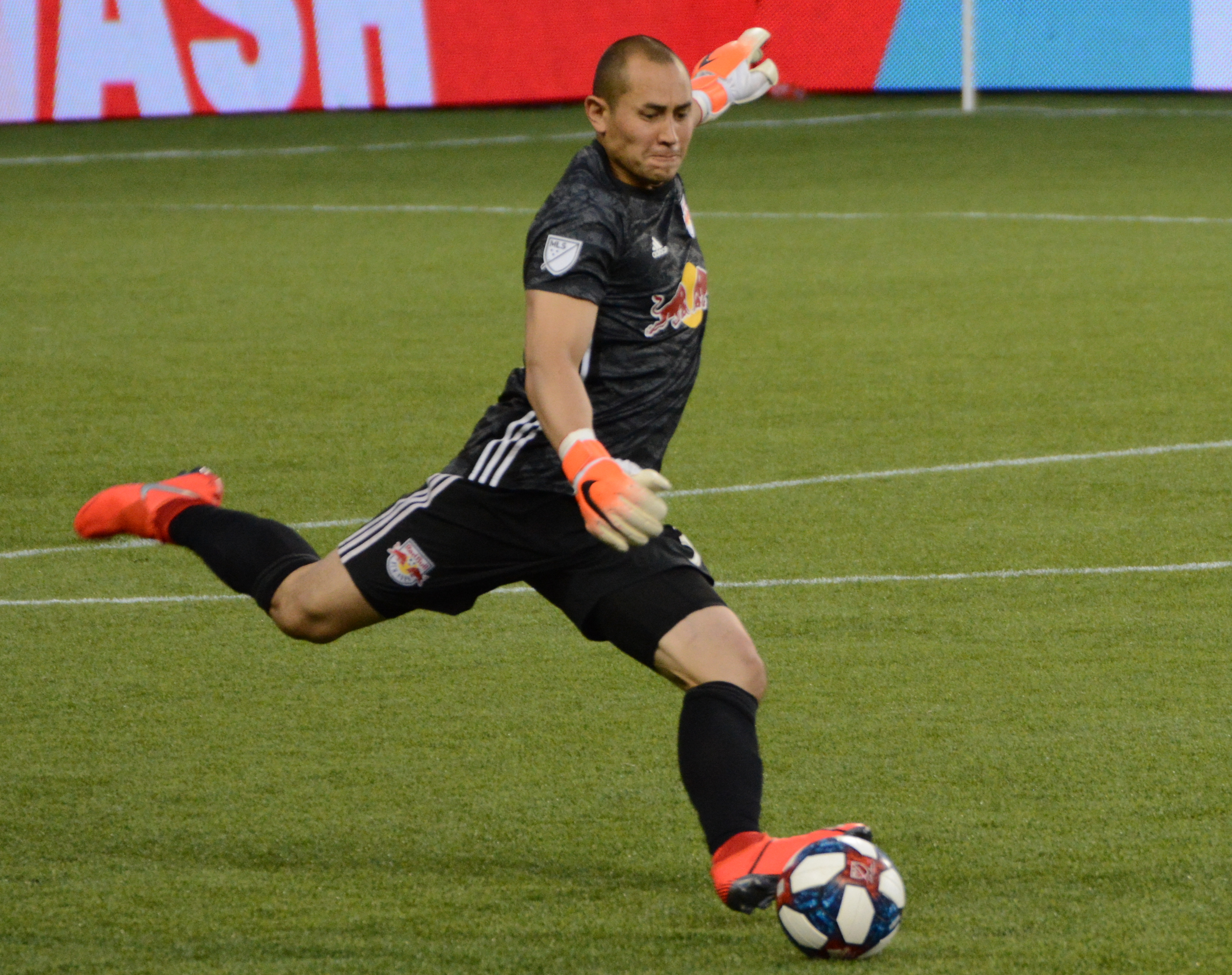
Robles with the Red Bulls in 2019

Robles was named the 2019 New York Red Bulls Humanitarian of the Year for his work with children with serious illnesses, as well as his involvement with the Laureus Sport for Good fashion show. New York elected not to re-sign Robles following the 2019 season. He left New York holding club career records for games played, games started, and minutes played.

=== Inter Miami ===
In December 2019, Robles joined MLS expansion side Inter Miami CF ahead of their inaugural 2020 season.

Following the 2020 season, Inter Miami declined Robles's contract option. Robles announced his retirement from playing professional soccer on January 6, 2021.

== International career ==
In May 2009, Robles was invited to a May 26 – June 1 senior men's national team training camp, his first camp with the full national team, although he was not named to the official roster for the June 3 and 6 World Cup qualifying matches. A week after the conclusion of his first camp, Robles was named to the United States roster for the Confederations Cup. On July 11, 2009, Robles made his debut with the United States against Haiti in the 2009 CONCACAF Gold Cup, a game which ended drawn 2–2. Robles made his return to the United States national team with a 3–2 friendly win against Iceland on January 31, 2016. He would make his third cap in a 1–0 friendly win against Jamaica on February 3, 2017, but was subbed out after 45 minutes.

== Career statistics ==
=== Club ===
Appearances and goals by club, season and competition
Club	Season	League			Playoffs		National cup		Continental		Total	
Club	Season	Division	Apps	Goals	Apps	Goals	Apps	Goals	Apps	Goals	Apps	Goals
1. FC Kaiserslautern	2008–09	2. Bundesliga	20	0	—		0	0	—		20	0
1. FC Kaiserslautern	2009–10	2. Bundesliga	1	0	—		0	0	—		1	0
1. FC Kaiserslautern	Total		21	0	—		0	0	—		21	0
Karlsruher SC	2010–11	2. Bundesliga	23	0	—		0	0	—		23	0
Karlsruher SC	2011–12	2. Bundesliga	5	0	—		0	0	—		5	0
Karlsruher SC	Total		28	0	—		0	0	—		28	0
New York Red Bulls	2012	Major League Soccer	4	0	2	0	0	0	—		6	0
New York Red Bulls	2013	Major League Soccer	34	0	2	0	0	0	—		36	0
New York Red Bulls	2014	Major League Soccer	34	0	5	0	0	0	0	0	39	0
New York Red Bulls	2015	Major League Soccer	34	0	4	0	3	0	—		41	0
New York Red Bulls	2016	Major League Soccer	34	0	2	0	1	0	3	0	40	0
New York Red Bulls	2017	Major League Soccer	34	0	3	0	0	0	2	0	39	0
New York Red Bulls	2018	Major League Soccer	31	0	4	0	1	0	6	0	42	0
New York Red Bulls	2019	Major League Soccer	33	0	1	0	0	0	4	0	38	0
New York Red Bulls	Total		238	0	23	0	5	0	15	0	281	0
Inter Miami CF	2020	Major League Soccer	15	0	0	0	—		—		15	0
Career total			302	0	23	0	5	0	15	0	345	0

== Honors ==
1. FC Kaiserslautern

- 2. Bundesliga: 2009–10

New York Red Bulls

- Supporters' Shield: 2013, 2015, 2018

Individual

- MLS Save of the Year: 2014
- MLS Goalkeeper of the Year: 2015
