= List of New York Red Bulls records and statistics =

Records and statistics in relation to the American soccer club MetroStars/New York Red Bulls. They were founded in 1995 as the New York/New Jersey MetroStars and played their first competitive match in the inaugural 1996 Major League Soccer season. In 2006 the club was renamed to the New York Red Bulls.

== Honors ==
As of 2024 season

National
Competitions	Titles	Seasons	Runner-up
MLS Cup	0		2008, 2024
Supporters' Shield	3	2013, 2015, 2018	
U.S. Open Cup	0		2003, 2017

Conference

- Eastern Conference
  - Winners (Playoffs): 2024
  - Runners Up (Playoffs) (3): 2014, 2015, 2018
  - Winners (Regular Season) (6): 2000, 2010, 2013, 2015, 2016, 2018
  - Runners Up (Regular Season): 2001
- Western Conference
  - Winners (Playoffs): 2008

Rivalry

- Atlantic Cup (12): 2003, 2010, 2011, 2013, 2015, 2017, 2018, 2019, 2020, 2022, 2023, 2024
- Hudson River Derby Trophy (2): 2023, 2026

Friendly

- MLS Preseason Tournament: 2001
- La Manga Cup: 2004
- Walt Disney World Pro Soccer Classic: 2010
- Emirates Cup: 2011
- Coachella Valley Invitational: 2023

== Records ==
As of March 13, 2022

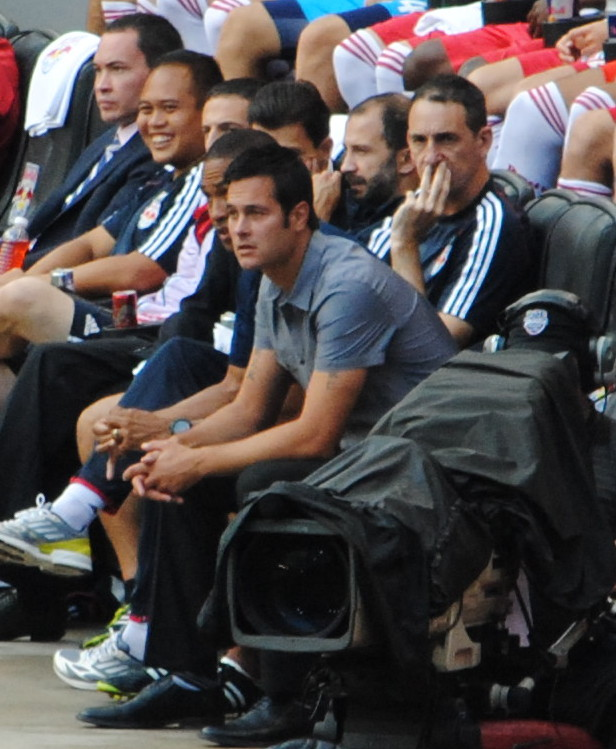
Former defender and coach, Mike Petke lead the club to its first major piece of silverware in 2013.

=== Team ===
- Victory: 7–0 vs. New York City FC, May 21, 2016
- Draw with most goals: 5–5 vs. San Jose Earthquakes, May 8, 2004
- Defeat: 0–6 vs. Kansas City Wizards, June 20, 1999
- Most points in a season (3 pts per win): 71 (2018, 34 games)
- Most victories in a season: 22 (2018)
- Fewest victories in a season: 5 (2009)
- Most goals scored in MLS season (team): 64 (2000)

=== Individual ===
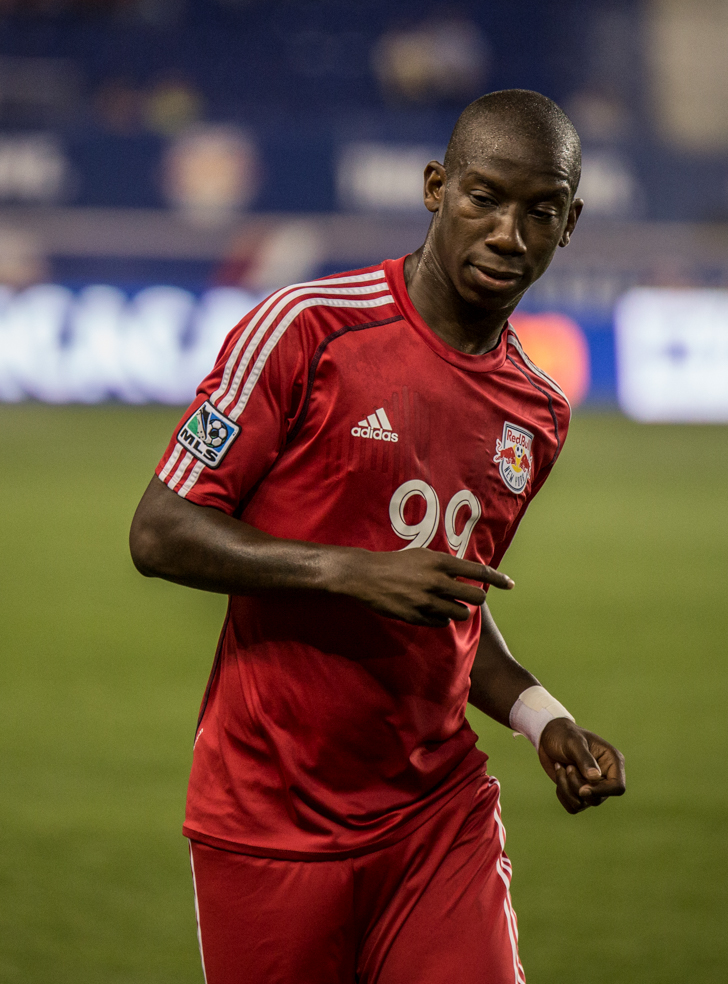
Bradley Wright-Phillips became the all-time leading scorer on July 31, 2016

- Fastest goal scored: 7 seconds Mike Grella (2015)
- Most goals scored in MLS game (player): 5 Clint Mathis v Dallas Burn, August 25, 2000
- Most goals scored in MLS season (player): 27 Bradley Wright-Phillips (2014)
- Most hat-tricks (Total): 5 Bradley Wright-Phillips
- Most appearances (Total): 281 Luis Robles
- Most appearances (MLS): 239 Luis Robles
- Most appearances (Playoffs): 23 Luis Robles
- Most appearances (Open Cup): 14 John Wolyniec
- Most appearances (Continental): 15 Sean Davis, Luis Robles, Aaron Long
- Most goals scored (Total): 126 Bradley Wright-Phillips
- Most goals scored (MLS): 108 Bradley Wright-Phillips
- Most goals scored (Playoffs): 9 Bradley Wright-Phillips
- Most goals scored (Open Cup): 7 John Wolyniec
- Most goals scored (Continental): 4 Bradley Wright-Phillips, Daniel Royer

=== Managerial ===
- Most games managed (Total): 151 Jesse Marsch
- Most victories (Total): 76 Jesse Marsch
- Most losses (Total): 46 Octavio Zambrano
- Most draws (Total): 32 Hans Backe

== Player records ==
=== All-time top 10 appearances ===
As of May 23, 2026 (All competitive matches):

Place	Name	Period	MLS	Playoffs	Open Cup	Continental	Total
1	(United States) Luis Robles	2012–2019	238	23	5	15	281
2	(England) Bradley Wright-Phillips	2013–2019	195	20	11	14	240
3	(United States) Sean Davis	2015–2021	173	9	11	15	208
4	(United States) Dax McCarty	2011–2016	169	17	9	3	198
5	(United States) Mike Petke	1998–2002; 2009–2010	169	9	13	6	197
6	(United States) Sean Nealis	2019–2025	160	10	9	8	187
7	(Paraguay) Carlos Coronel	2021–2025	159	10	4	6	179
8	(Jamaica) Dane Richards	2007–2012; 2015	159	11	4	2	176
9	(United States) Aaron Long	2016–2022	140	9	11	15	175
10	(United States) John Wolyniec	1999; 2003–2010	142	10	14	1	167

Bold signifies current Red Bulls player

=== All-time top 10 goalscorers ===
As of August 31, 2024 (All competitive matches):

Place	Name	Period	MLS	Playoffs	Open Cup	Continental	Total
1	(England) Bradley Wright-Phillips	2013–2019	108	9	5	4	126
2	(Colombia) Juan Pablo Ángel	2007–2010	58	3	1	0	62
3	(France) Thierry Henry	2010–2014	51	1	0	0	52
4	(Austria) Daniel Royer	2016–2021	39	4	3	4	50
5	(United States) Clint Mathis	2000–2003; 2007	39	3	3	0	45
6	(Venezuela) Giovanni Savarese	1996–1998	41	1	2	0	44
7	(Honduras) Amado Guevara	2003–2006	32	2	5	0	39
8	(United States) John Wolyniec	1999; 2003–2010	26	2	7	1	36
9	(Scotland) **Lewis Morgan**	2022–**Present**	26	1	3	0	30
10	(Colombia) Adolfo Valencia	2000–2001	21	5	1	2	29

Bold signifies current Red Bulls player

=== All-time top 10 cleansheets ===
As of June 22, 2024 (All competitive matches):

Place	Name	Period	MLS	Playoffs	Open Cup	Continental	Total
1	(United States) Luis Robles	2012–2019	72	8	2	7	89
2	(Paraguay) **Carlos Coronel**	2021–**Present**	33	0	1	2	36
3	(United States) Tony Meola	1996–1998; 2005–2006	25	1	4	0	30
4	(United States) **Ryan Meara**	2012–**Present**	10	0	7	3	20
5	(United States) Jon Conway	2006–2009	17	1	0	0	18
6	(Senegal) Bouna Coundoul	2009–2011	16	1	0	0	17
6	(United States) Tim Howard	1998–2003	15	0	1	1	17
7	(United States) Jonny Walker	2003–2004	9	0	1	0	10
8	(Germany) Frank Rost	2011	5	1	0	0	6
8	(Canada) Greg Sutton	2010–2011	4	0	2	0	6
9	(United States) Mike Ammann	1999–2000	4	1	0	0	5
9	(Netherlands) Ronald Waterreus	2007	5	0	0	0	5
10	(United States) Zach Wells	2004–2005	4	0	0	0	4

Bold signifies current Red Bulls player

== Coaching Records ==
As of June 22, 2024

Coach	From	To	Record				
Coach	From	To	G	W	D	L	Win %
(Italy) Eddie Firmani	January 3, 1996	May 5, 1996	8	3	0	5	37.50
(Portugal) Carlos Queiroz	May 30, 1996	October 10, 1996	27	13	0	14	48.15
(Brazil) Carlos Alberto Parreira	December 30, 1996	December 11, 1997	35	15	0	20	42.86
(Spain) Alfonso Mondelo	January 14, 1998	September 21, 1998	34	16	0	18	47.06
(Serbia) Bora Milutinović	September 21, 1998	October 29, 1999	36	8	0	28	22.22
(Ecuador) Octavio Zambrano	November 29, 1999	October 8, 2002	107	52	9	46	48.60
(United States) Bob Bradley	October 22, 2002	October 4, 2005	100	36	27	37	36.00
(Scotland) Mo Johnston	October 4, 2005	June 27, 2006	17	5	8	4	29.41
(United States) Richie Williams (Interim)	June 27, 2006	August 8, 2006	9	4	2	3	44.44
(United States) Bruce Arena	August 8, 2006	November 5, 2007	48	16	12	20	33.33
(Colombia) Juan Carlos Osorio	December 18, 2007	August 21, 2009	61	15	15	31	24.59
(United States) Richie Williams (Interim)	August 21, 2009	January 7, 2010	8	3	2	3	37.50
(Sweden) Hans Backe	January 7, 2010	November 9, 2012	113	48	32	33	42.48
(United States) Mike Petke	January 24, 2013	January 7, 2015	82	34	23	25	41.46
(United States) Jesse Marsch	January 7, 2015	July 6, 2018	151	76	30	45	50.33
(United States) Chris Armas	July 6, 2018	September 4, 2020	71	33	11	27	46.48
(South Africa) Bradley Carnell (Interim)	September 5, 2020	November 19, 2020	14	6	3	5	42.86
(Austria) Gerhard Struber	November 19, 2020	May 8, 2023	87	33	23	31	37.93
(United States) Troy Lesesne	May 8, 2023	November 14, 2023	32	14	7	11	43.75
(Germany) Sandro Schwarz	December 14, 2023	Present	20	9	7	4	45.00
Total			1,053	435	210	408	41.31

=== Trophies ===
No.	Name	MLS	SS	USOC	CCL	Total
1	(United States) Chris Armas	–	1	–	–	1
1	(United States) Jesse Marsch	–	1	–	–	1
1	(United States) Mike Petke	–	1	–	–	1

== International results ==
=== By competition ===
As of August 10, 2023

Competition	Pld	W	D	L	GF	GA	GD	% W
CONCACAF Champions League	22	8	8	6	27	19	+8	36.36
Copa Merconorte	6	3	0	3	8	5	+3	50.00
Leagues Cup	4	2	2	0	4	2	+2	50.00
Total	32	13	10	9	39	26	+13	40.62

=== By club ===
As of August 10, 2023 (Includes: Copa Merconorte, CONCACAF Champions League, and Leagues Cup)

Club	Pld	W	D	L	GF	GA	GD
(El Salvador) Alianza	2	1	1	0	2	1	+1
(Guatemala) Antigua	2	1	1	0	3	0	+3
(Dominican Republic) Atlético Pantoja	2	2	0	0	5	0	+5
(Mexico) Atlético San Luis	1	1	0	0	2	1	+1
(Canada) CF Montreal	2	0	1	1	1	2	–1
(Venezuela) Deportivo Italchacao	2	1	0	1	3	2	+1
(El Salvador) FAS	2	1	1	0	2	0	+2
(Mexico) Guadalajara	4	2	1	1	4	1	+3
(Colombia) Millonarios	2	0	0	2	1	3	–2
(United States) New England Revolution	1	0	1	0	0	0	0
(United States) New York City FC	1	1	0	0	1	0	+1
(Honduras) Olimpia	2	1	1	0	3	1	+2
(Mexico) Pachuca	0	0	0	0	0	0	0
(United States) Philadelphia Union	1	0	1	0	1	1	0
(Mexico) Santos Laguna	2	0	0	2	2	6	–4
(Mexico) Tijuana	2	2	0	0	5	1	+4
(Canada) Toronto FC	0	0	0	0	0	0	0
(Canada) Vancouver Whitecaps	2	0	1	1	1	3	–2
(Trinidad and Tobago) W Connection	2	0	1	1	3	4	–1

=== By country ===
As of August 10, 2023 (Includes: Copa Merconorte, CONCACAF Champions League, and Leagues Cup)

Country	Pld	W	D	L	GF	GA	GD
Canada	4	0	2	2	2	5	–3
Colombia	2	0	0	2	1	3	–2
Dominican Republic	2	2	0	0	5	0	+5
El Salvador	4	2	2	0	4	1	+3
Guatemala	2	1	1	0	3	0	+3
Honduras	2	1	1	0	3	1	+2
Mexico	9	5	1	3	13	9	+4
Trinidad and Tobago	2	0	1	1	3	4	–1
United States	3	1	2	0	2	1	+1
Venezuela	2	1	0	1	3	2	+1

=== By season ===
Competition	Season	Round	Opposition	Home	Away	Aggregate
Copa Merconorte	2001	Group Stage	(Venezuela) Deportivo Italchacao	2–0	1–2	3rd
Copa Merconorte	2001	Group Stage	(Colombia) Millonarios	0–1	1–2	3rd
Copa Merconorte	2001	Group Stage	(Mexico) Guadalajara	2–0	2–0	3rd
CONCACAF Champions League	2009–10	Preliminary Round	(Trinidad and Tobago) W Connection	1–2	2–2	3–4
CONCACAF Champions League	2014–15	Group Stage	(El Salvador) FAS	2–0	0–0	2nd
CONCACAF Champions League	2014–15	Group Stage	(Canada) Montreal Impact	1–1	0–1	2nd
CONCACAF Champions League	2016–17	Group Stage	(Guatemala) Antigua	3–0	0–0	1st
CONCACAF Champions League	2016–17	Group Stage	(El Salvador) Alianza	1–0	1–1	1st
CONCACAF Champions League	2016–17	Quarterfinals	(Canada) Vancouver Whitecaps	1–1	0–2	1–3
CONCACAF Champions League	2018	Round of 16	(Honduras) Olimpia	3–0	1–1	3–1
CONCACAF Champions League	2018	Quarterfinals	(Mexico) Tijuana	3–1	2–0	5–1
CONCACAF Champions League	2018	Semifinals	(Mexico) Guadalajara	0–0	0–1	0–1
CONCACAF Champions League	2019	Round of 16	(Dominican Republic) Atlético Pantoja	3–0	2–0	5–0
CONCACAF Champions League	2019	Quarterfinals	(Mexico) Santos Laguna	0–2	2–4	2–6
Leagues Cup	2020	Round of 16	Canceled			
Leagues Cup	2023	Group Stage	(Mexico) Atlético San Luis	2–1		
Leagues Cup	2023	Group Stage	(United States) New England Revolution	1–1 (4–2p)		
Leagues Cup	2023	Round of 32	(United States) New York City FC	1–0		
Leagues Cup	2023	Round of 16	(United States) Philadelphia Union	1–1 (3–4p)		

== Transfers ==
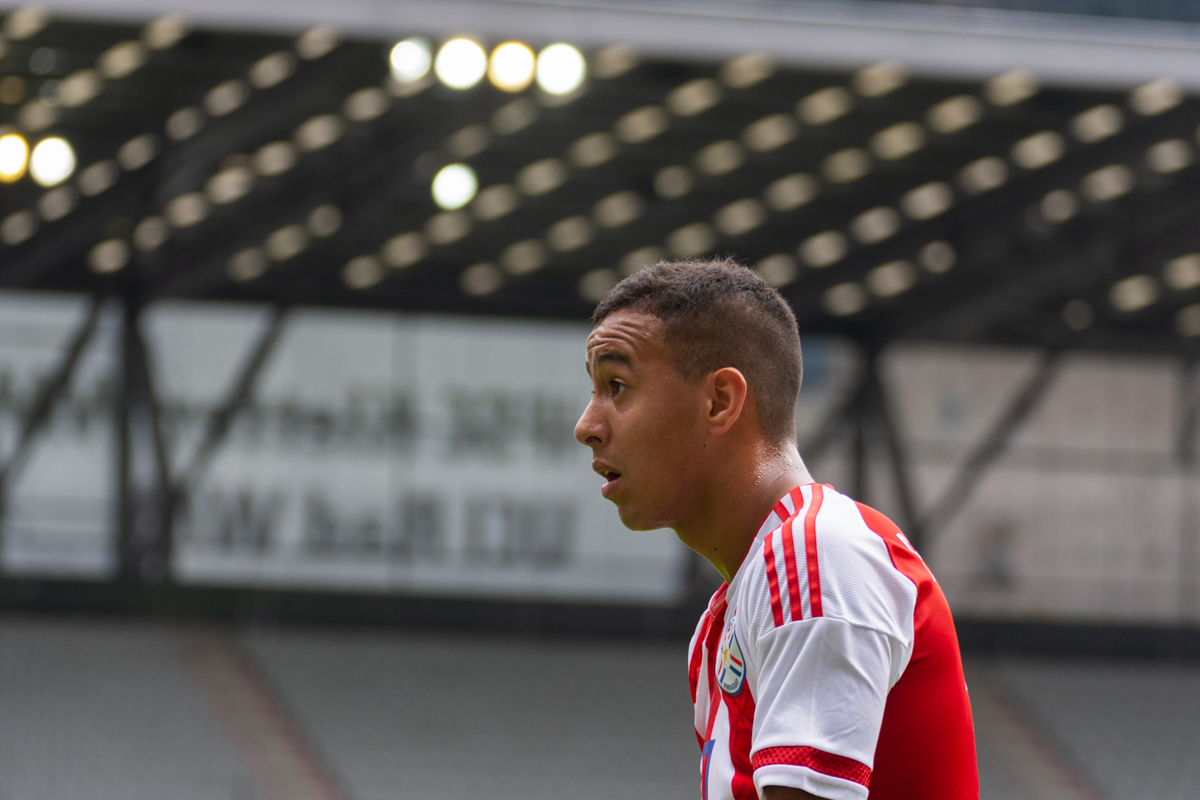
Kaku signed with the club in February 2018 for a club record fee of $6.25millon.

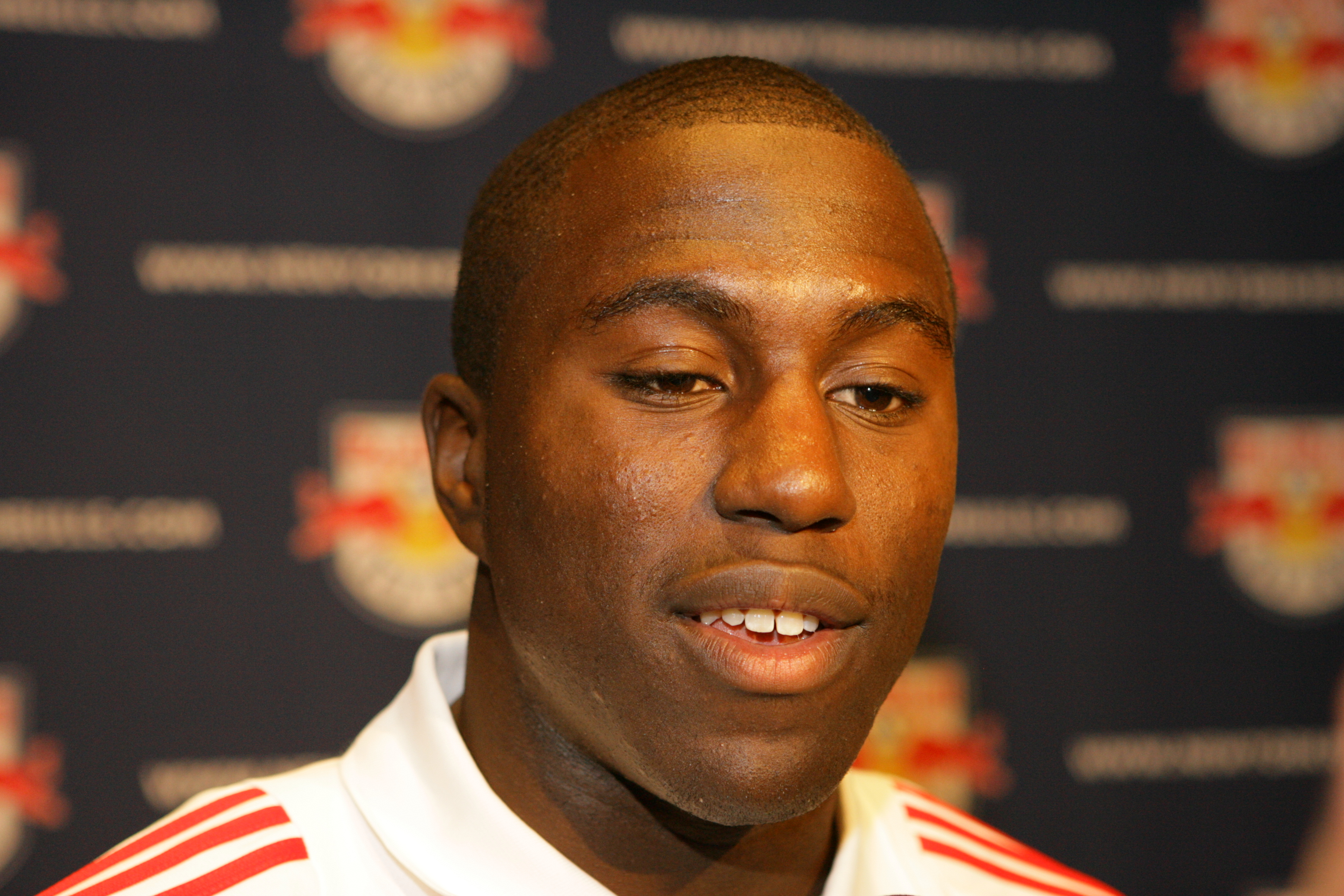
Jozy Altidore was sold to Villarreal CF for a club record fee of $10million in 2008.

As per MLS rules and regulations; some transfer fees have been undisclosed and are not included in the tables below.

=== Highest transfer fees paid ===
	Player	From	Fee	Date	Ref
1.	(Mexico) Jorge Ruvalcaba	(Mexico) UNAM	$6.25 million	February 2018	
2.	(Paraguay) Kaku	(Argentina) Huracán	$6.25 million	February 2018	
3.	(Poland) Patryk Klimala	(Scotland) Celtic	$4.8 million	April 2021	
4.	(Denmark) Mathias Jørgensen	(Denmark) Odense Boldklub	$2.5 million	February 2019	
5.	(Argentina) Gonzalo Verón	(Argentina) San Lorenzo	$2.2 million	August 2015	
6.	(Australia) Tim Cahill	(England) Everton	$1.55 million	July 2012	
7.	(Scotland) Lewis Morgan	(United States) Inter Miami	$1.2 million	December 2021	

=== Highest transfer fees received ===
	Player	To	Fee	Date	Ref
1.	(United States) Jozy Altidore	(Spain) Villarreal CF	$10 million	June 2008	
2.	(United States) Matt Miazga	(England) Chelsea	$5 million	January 2016	
4.	(United States) Tim Howard	(England) Manchester United	$4 million	July 2003	
4.	(United States) Frankie Amaya	(Mexico) Toluca	$4 million	June 2024	
4.	(United States) Tim Ream	(England) Bolton Wanderers	$3 million	January 2012	
4.	(United States) Tyler Adams	(Germany) RB Leipzig	$3 million	January 2019	
5.	(Jamaica) Kemar Lawrence	(Belgium) Anderlecht	$1.5 million	January 2020	

== Individual Honors ==
=== Landon Donovan MVP Award ===
Player	Year	Ref
(Honduras) Amado Guevara	2004	

=== MLS Golden Boot ===
Player	Year	Goals	Ref
(Honduras) Amado Guevara	2004	10	
(England) Bradley Wright-Phillips	2014	27	
(England) Bradley Wright-Phillips	2016	24	

=== MLS Goalkeeper of the Year ===
Player	Year	Ref
(United States) Tim Howard	2001	
(United States) Luis Robles	2015	

=== MLS Defender of the Year ===
Player	Year	Ref
(United States) Aaron Long	2018	

=== MLS Rookie of the Year ===
Player	Year	Ref
(Brazil) Rodrigo Faria	2001	

=== MLS Coach of the Year ===
Coach	Year	Ref
(United States) Jesse Marsch	2015	

=== MLS Goal of the Year ===
Player	Year	Ref
(United States) Clint Mathis	2001	

== Designated Players ==
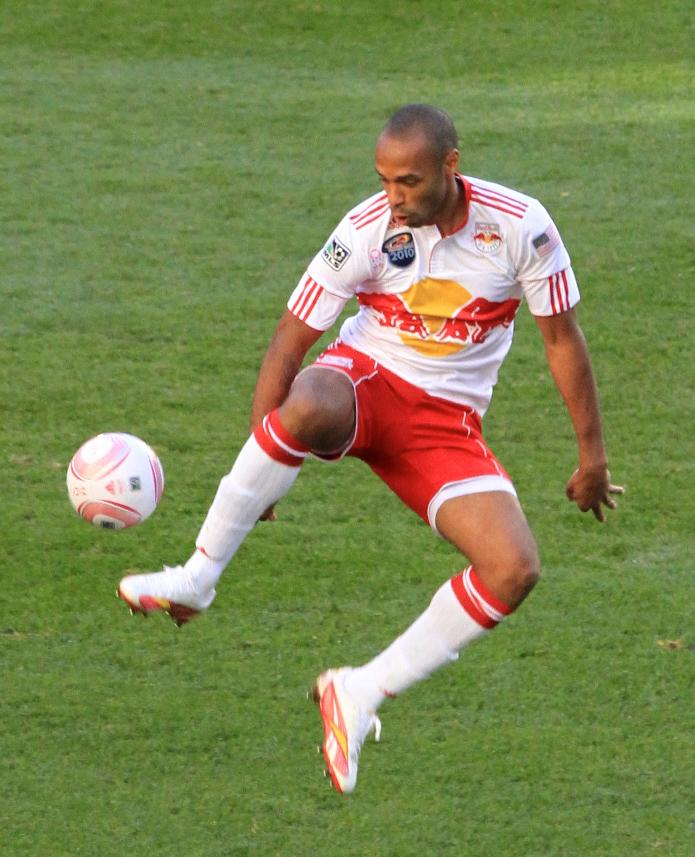
Henry playing for the New York Red Bulls in 2011.

As of April 6, 2024 (All competitive matches):

Nation	Name	Position	Period	Matches	Goals
(Argentina)	Gonzalo Verón	FW	2015–2017	82	12
(Australia)	Tim Cahill	MF	2012–2014	72	16
(Belgium)	Dante Vanzeir	FW	2023–Present	29	6
(Brazil)	Luquinhas	MF	2022–2023	70	10
(Colombia)	Juan Pablo Ángel	FW	2007–2010	112	62
(England)	Josh Sims	MF	2019–2020	10	1
(England)	Bradley Wright-Phillips	FW	2013–2019	240	126
(England)	Dru Yearwood	MF	2020–2023	99	3
(France)	Thierry Henry	FW	2010–2014	135	52
(Germany)	Frank Rost	GK	2011	14	0
(Israel)	Omer Damari	FW	2016	6	1
(Mexico)	Rafael Márquez	DF	2010–2012	50	1
(Paraguay)	Kaku	MF	2018–2020	87	14
(Poland)	Patryk Klimala	FW	2021–2022	62	14
(Sweden)	Emil Forsberg	MF	2024–Present	5	1
(United States)	Sacha Kljestan	MF	2015–2017	121	22
(United States)	Claudio Reyna	MF	2007–2008	30	0

== FIFA World Cup Winners ==
- (Germany) 1990 FIFA World Cup:
  - Lothar Matthäus
- (Brazil) 1994 FIFA World Cup:
  - Branco
- (France) 1998 FIFA World Cup:
  - Youri Djorkaeff
  - Thierry Henry
