= 2015 Major League Soccer season =

20th season of Major League Soccer

Major League Soccer
- Season: 2015
- Dates: March 6th — October 25th (Regular Season)
- Teams: 20
- MLS Cup: Portland Timbers (1st title)
- Supporters' Shield: New York Red Bulls (2nd shield)
- Champions League (United States): FC Dallas; New York Red Bulls; Portland Timbers; Sporting Kansas City
- Champions League (Canada): Vancouver Whitecaps FC
- Matches: 340
- Goals: 937 (2.76 per match)
- Top goalscorer: Sebastian Giovinco; Kei Kamara (22 goals each)
- Best goalkeeper: Adam Kwarasey; David Ousted (13 shutouts each)
- Biggest home win: 5 goals: LA 5–0 POR (Jun 24); TOR 5–0 ORL (Aug 22); CLB 5–0 DC (Oct 25)
- Biggest away win: 5 goals: SKC 0–5 SJ (Aug 19)
- Highest scoring: 10 goals: DC 6–4 RSL (Aug 1)
- Longest winning run: 6 games: New England Revolution (Aug 1 – Sep 16)
- Longest unbeaten run: 9 games: New England Revolution (Mar 21 – May 16); Portland Timbers (Oct 14 – Dec 6)
- Longest winless run: 11 games: New York City FC (Mar 21 – May 30)
- Longest losing run: 5 games: New England Revolution (Jun 21 – Jul 11); Seattle Sounders FC (Jul 11 – Aug 9); Chicago Fire (Sep 5 – Sep 26)
- Highest attendance: 64,358; SEA 2–1 POR (Aug 30)
- Lowest attendance: 10,035; MTL 2–1 VAN (Jun 3)
- Total attendance: 7,335,053
- Average attendance: 21,574

Locations of teams for the 2015 Major League Soccer season
Western Conference Eastern Conference

The 2015 Major League Soccer season featured 20 total clubs (17 based in the United States, 3 based in Canada). The regular season was held from March 6 through to October 25, whereas the MLS Cup playoffs began on October 28 and ended with MLS Cup 2015 on December 6. The defending MLS Cup champions were the LA Galaxy, while Seattle Sounders FC were the defending Supporters' Shield winners.

It was the first season for expansion teams Orlando City SC and New York City FC, who both joined the Eastern Conference, while both the Houston Dynamo and Sporting Kansas City moved from the Eastern Conference to the Western Conference. Chivas USA folded at the end of the 2014 season.

At the end of the regular season, the New York Red Bulls of the Eastern Conference won the Supporters' Shield, while the team on top of the Western Conference was FC Dallas. The Portland Timbers won their first MLS Cup, winning 2–1 at Columbus Crew SC.

== Overview ==
The 2015 season began on Friday, March 6. The opening weekend saw an average attendance of 25,838 — buoyed by strong attendances in Orlando (62,510), and Seattle (39,782) — with seven of the weekend's ten matches selling out. Additionally, MLS saw strong TV ratings on ESPN2 (539,000 viewers), Unimas (341,000 viewers), and Fox Sports 1 (289,000 and 278,500 viewers).

=== Franchise changes ===
The 2015 MLS season featured the addition of two expansion teams, New York City FC and Orlando City SC. New York City FC became the second MLS team in the New York metropolitan area (joining the New Jersey-based New York Red Bulls), as well as the first based within New York City itself, as the team played its inaugural season at Yankee Stadium). Orlando was a new market for MLS, which returned to Florida for the first time since folding their Miami and Tampa Bay franchises before the 2002 season. The Lions' ownership previously owned Orlando's team that played in the league then known as USL Pro from 2010 to 2014; that team that relocated to Louisville for the 2015 season of the rebranded United Soccer League.

While MLS added two teams, one team closed down. Chivas USA, which had called the Los Angeles area home since 2005 and shared the StubHub Center with the LA Galaxy. Chivas had been owned by Mexican club, C.D. Guadalajara, who sold the club back to MLS in 2014. The league folded Chivas in October 2014, after the conclusion of the regular season, though it announced plans to add a second LA-area club, Los Angeles FC, in 2018.

=== Realignment and playoffs ===
With the addition and subtraction of the above-mentioned teams, the 2015 season saw a realignment of MLS's Eastern and Western conferences: New York City FC and Orlando City SC joined the East, while Houston Dynamo and Sporting Kansas City moved from the East to the West.

Each team played 34 regular season matches: two or three against conference rivals and once against teams from the opposite conference. The regular season concluded with all teams playing at the same scheduled time, a league first.

Twelve teams advanced to the MLS Cup playoffs, up from ten the previous three seasons. The top six teams per conference qualified. The first round per conference had the third-seed hosting the sixth-seed, and the fourth hosting the fifth. In the conference semifinals, the top seed played the lowest remaining seed and the second played the next-lowest.

=== Television ===
The 2015 season saw the launch of a new United States television and media rights deal with English-language ESPN and Fox Sports and Spanish-language Univision Deportes. The deal continued MLS's relationship with ESPN and Univision, while it reestablished one with Fox Sports, whose Fox Soccer channel carried MLS games until 2011 (NBC Sports carried MLS broadcasts from 2012 to 2014). The deal, formally announced in May 2014, saw regular weekly game broadcasts on ESPN2 (Sunday afternoons) and Fox Sports 1 (Sunday evenings), as well as a regular Friday night match on UniMás and/or Univision Deportes Network. The networks shared coverage of the MLS Cup playoffs, while ESPN and Fox alternated English language carriage of the MLS All-Star Game and MLS Cup championship match each year. The 2015 MLS All-Star Game was on Fox Sports, and MLS Cup 2015 aired on ESPN. As part of the deal, the networks also shared coverage of the U.S. Soccer men's and women's national teams.

The league reached a four-year agreement with Sky Sports to televise league matches live in the United Kingdom and Ireland. At least two regular season matches each week, the MLS All-Star Game, and every MLS Cup playoff match was aired on the Sky family of networks. MLS also reached a four-year agreement with Eurosport to air live matches in many other European countries.

== Teams ==
=== Stadiums and locations ===
Chicago Fire	Colorado Rapids	Columbus Crew SC	D.C. United	FC Dallas	Houston Dynamo
Toyota Park	Dick's Sporting Goods Park	Mapfre Stadium	RFK Memorial Stadium	Toyota Stadium	BBVA Compass Stadium
Capacity: 20,000	Capacity: 18,000	Capacity: 20,145	Capacity: 20,000	Capacity: 20,500	Capacity: 22,000
LA Galaxy	Montreal Impact	Locations of teams for the 2015 Major League Soccer season Eastern Conference; Western Conference		New England Revolution	New York City FC
StubHub Center	Saputo Stadium	Locations of teams for the 2015 Major League Soccer season Eastern Conference; Western Conference		Gillette Stadium	Yankee Stadium
Capacity: 27,000	Capacity: 20,801	Locations of teams for the 2015 Major League Soccer season Eastern Conference; Western Conference		Capacity: 22,385	Capacity: 33,444
New York Red Bulls	Orlando	Locations of teams for the 2015 Major League Soccer season Eastern Conference; Western Conference		Philadelphia Union	Portland Timbers
Red Bull Arena	Citrus Bowl	Locations of teams for the 2015 Major League Soccer season Eastern Conference; Western Conference		PPL Park	Providence Park
Capacity: 25,000	Capacity: 23,000	Locations of teams for the 2015 Major League Soccer season Eastern Conference; Western Conference		Capacity: 18,500	Capacity: 22,000
Real Salt Lake	San Jose Earthquakes	Seattle Sounders FC	Sporting Kansas City	Toronto FC	Vancouver Whitecaps FC
Rio Tinto Stadium	Avaya Stadium	CenturyLink Field	Sporting Park	BMO Field	BC Place
Capacity: 20,000	Capacity: 18,000	Capacity: 39,115	Capacity: 18,500	Capacity: 30,991	Capacity: 21,000

=== Personnel and sponsorship ===
Note: All teams use Adidas as kit manufacturer.

Team	Head coach	Captain	Shirt sponsor
Chicago Fire	(Serbia) Veljko Paunović	(United States) Jeff Larentowicz	Quaker
Colorado Rapids	(United States) Pablo Mastroeni	(United States) Drew Moor	Transamerica
Columbus Crew SC	(United States) Gregg Berhalter	(United States) Michael Parkhurst	Barbasol
D.C. United	(United States) Ben Olsen	(United States) Bobby Boswell	Leidos
FC Dallas	(Colombia) Óscar Pareja	(United States) Matt Hedges	AdvoCare
Houston Dynamo	(Republic of Ireland) Owen Coyle	(United States) Brad Davis	BHP Billiton
LA Galaxy	(United States) Bruce Arena	(Republic of Ireland) Robbie Keane	Herbalife
Montreal Impact	(Canada) Mauro Biello	(Canada) Patrice Bernier	Bank of Montreal
New England Revolution	(United States) Jay Heaps	(United States) Jermaine Jones	UnitedHealthcare
New York City FC	(United States) Jason Kreis	(Spain) David Villa	Etihad Airways
New York Red Bulls	(United States) Jesse Marsch	(United States) Dax McCarty	Red Bull
Orlando City SC	(England) Adrian Heath	(Brazil) Kaká	Orlando Health
Philadelphia Union	(United States) Jim Curtin	(United States) Maurice Edu	Bimbo
Portland Timbers	(United States) Caleb Porter	(Canada) Will Johnson	Alaska Airlines
Real Salt Lake	(United States) Jeff Cassar	(United States) Kyle Beckerman	LifeVantage
San Jose Earthquakes	(United States) Dominic Kinnear	(United States) Chris Wondolowski	—
Seattle Sounders FC	(United States) Sigi Schmid	(United States) Brad Evans	Xbox
Sporting Kansas City	(United States) Peter Vermes	(United States) Matt Besler	Ivy Funds
Toronto FC	(United States) Greg Vanney	(United States) Michael Bradley	Bank of Montreal
Vancouver Whitecaps FC	(Wales) Carl Robinson	(Chile) Pedro Morales	Bell Canada

=== Managerial changes ===
Team	Outgoing manager	Manner of departure	Date of vacancy	Position in table	Incoming manager	Date of appointment
San Jose Earthquakes	(Canada) Mark Watson	Fired	October 16, 2014	Preseason	(United States) Dominic Kinnear	October 16, 2014
Houston Dynamo	(United States) Dominic Kinnear	Signed by San Jose Earthquakes	October 16, 2014	Preseason	(Republic of Ireland) Owen Coyle	December 8, 2014
New York Red Bulls	(United States) Mike Petke	Fired	January 7, 2015	Preseason	(United States) Jesse Marsch	January 7, 2015
Montreal Impact	(United States) Frank Klopas	Fired	August 29, 2015	7th in East, 17th overall	(Canada) Mauro Biello (Interim)	August 29, 2015
Chicago Fire	(Canada) Frank Yallop	Fired	September 20, 2015	10th in East, 20th overall	(United States) Brian Bliss (Interim)	September 20, 2015
New York City FC	(United States) Jason Kreis	Fired	November 2, 2015	Postseason	(France) Patrick Vieira	November 9, 2015
Chicago Fire	(United States) Brian Bliss	End of interim period	November 24, 2015	Postseason	(Serbia) Veljko Paunovic	November 24, 2015

== Regular season ==
=== Eastern Conference ===
Pos	Team	Pld	W	L	T	GF	GA	GD	Pts	Qualification
1	New York Red Bulls	34	18	10	6	62	43	+19	60	Qualification for the conference semifinals
2	Columbus Crew SC	34	15	11	8	58	53	+5	53	Qualification for the conference semifinals
3	Montreal Impact	34	15	13	6	48	44	+4	51	Qualification for the knockout round
4	D.C. United	34	15	13	6	43	45	−2	51	Qualification for the knockout round
5	New England Revolution	34	14	12	8	48	47	+1	50	Qualification for the knockout round
6	Toronto FC	34	15	15	4	58	58	0	49	Qualification for the knockout round
7	Orlando City SC	34	12	14	8	46	56	−10	44	
8	New York City FC	34	10	17	7	49	58	−9	37	
9	Philadelphia Union	34	10	17	7	42	55	−13	37	
10	Chicago Fire	34	8	20	6	43	58	−15	30	

Source: MLS

=== Western Conference ===
Pos	Team	Pld	W	L	T	GF	GA	GD	Pts	Qualification
1	FC Dallas	34	18	10	6	52	39	+13	60	Qualification for the conference semifinals
2	Vancouver Whitecaps FC	34	16	13	5	45	36	+9	53	Qualification for the conference semifinals
3	Portland Timbers	34	15	11	8	41	39	+2	53	Qualification for the knockout round
4	Seattle Sounders FC	34	15	13	6	44	36	+8	51	Qualification for the knockout round
5	LA Galaxy	34	14	11	9	56	46	+10	51	Qualification for the knockout round
6	Sporting Kansas City	34	14	11	9	48	45	+3	51	Qualification for the knockout round
7	San Jose Earthquakes	34	13	13	8	41	39	+2	47	
8	Houston Dynamo	34	11	14	9	42	49	−7	42	
9	Real Salt Lake	34	11	15	8	38	48	−10	41	
10	Colorado Rapids	34	9	15	10	33	43	−10	37	

Source: MLS

=== Overall standings ===
Pos	Team	Pld	W	L	T	GF	GA	GD	Pts	
1	New York Red Bulls (S)	34	18	10	6	62	43	+19	60	Qualification for the CONCACAF Champions League
2	FC Dallas	34	18	10	6	52	39	+13	60	Qualification for the CONCACAF Champions League
3	Vancouver Whitecaps FC (V)	34	16	13	5	45	36	+9	53	Qualification for the CONCACAF Champions League
4	Columbus Crew SC	34	15	11	8	58	53	+5	53	
5	Portland Timbers (C)	34	15	11	8	41	39	+2	53	Qualification for the CONCACAF Champions League
6	Seattle Sounders FC	34	15	13	6	44	36	+8	51	
7	Montreal Impact	34	15	13	6	48	44	+4	51	
8	D.C. United	34	15	13	6	43	45	−2	51	
9	LA Galaxy	34	14	11	9	56	46	+10	51	
10	Sporting Kansas City (U)	34	14	11	9	48	45	+3	51	Qualification for the CONCACAF Champions League
11	New England Revolution	34	14	12	8	48	47	+1	50	
12	Toronto FC	34	15	15	4	58	58	0	49	
13	San Jose Earthquakes	34	13	13	8	41	39	+2	47	
14	Orlando City SC	34	12	14	8	46	56	−10	44	
15	Houston Dynamo	34	11	14	9	42	49	−7	42	
16	Real Salt Lake	34	11	15	8	38	48	−10	41	
17	New York City FC	34	10	17	7	49	58	−9	37	
18	Philadelphia Union	34	10	17	7	42	55	−13	37	
19	Colorado Rapids	34	9	15	10	33	43	−10	37	
20	Chicago Fire	34	8	20	6	43	58	−15	30	

Source: MLS
Rules for classification: 1) points; 2) total wins; 3) total goal differential; 4) total goals scored
(C) MLS Cup champions; (S) Supporters' Shield winners; (U) U.S. Open Cup winners; (V) Canadian Championship winners

== MLS Cup playoffs ==
=== Bracket ===
Knockout round
October 29 – Saputo Stadium
E6	Toronto FC	0
E3	Montreal Impact	3
October 28 – RFK Stadium
E5	New England Revolution	1
E4	D.C. United	2
October 29 – Providence Park
W6	Sporting Kansas City	2 (6)
W3	Portland Timbers (p)	2 (7)
October 28 – CenturyLink Field
W5	LA Galaxy	2
W4	Seattle Sounders FC	3

Conference semifinals
E3	Montreal Impact	2	1	3
E2	Columbus Crew SC (a.e.t.)	1	3	4
Eastern Conference
E4	D.C. United	0	0	0
E1	New York Red Bulls	1	1	2
W3	Portland Timbers	0	2	2
W2	Vancouver Whitecaps FC	0	0	0
Western Conference
W4	Seattle Sounders FC	2	1	3 (2)
W1	FC Dallas (p)	1	2	3 (4)

Conference finals
E2	Columbus Crew SC	2	0	2
E1	New York Red Bulls	0	1	1
W3	Portland Timbers	3	2	5
W1	FC Dallas	1	2	3

MLS Cup
December 6 – Mapfre Stadium
E2	Columbus Crew SC	1
W3	Portland Timbers	2

=== MLS Cup ===
December 6, 2015
4:00 p.m. EST

Columbus Crew SC	1–2	Portland Timbers
Kamara 18'	Report	Valeri 1'; Wallace 7'

Mapfre Stadium, Columbus, Ohio
Attendance: 21,747
Referee: Jair Marrufo

== Attendance ==
=== Average home attendances ===
Ranked from highest to lowest average attendance.

Team	GP	Total	High	Low	Average
Seattle Sounders FC	17	752,192	64,358	39,175	44,247
Orlando City SC	17	558,407	62,510	23,372	32,847
New York City FC	17	493,267	48,047	20,461	29,016
Toronto FC	17	398,671	30,266	16,382	23,451
LA Galaxy	17	397,668	27,000	13,391	23,392
Portland Timbers	17	359,418	21,144	21,144	21,144
San Jose Earthquakes	17	356,646	50,422	18,000	20,979
Houston Dynamo	17	351,187	22,651	16,018	20,658
Vancouver Whitecaps FC	17	348,624	22,500	18,083	20,507
Real Salt Lake	17	342,718	21,004	18,895	20,160
Sporting Kansas City	17	334,684	21,505	18,864	19,687
New York Red Bulls	17	334,172	25,219	12,540	19,657
New England Revolution	17	333,652	42,947	10,668	19,627
Montreal Impact	17	301,742	25,245	10,035	17,750
Philadelphia Union	17	296,674	18,883	15,374	17,451
Columbus Crew SC	17	288,747	22,719	10,302	16,985
D.C. United	17	276,152	21,517	11,218	16,244
FC Dallas	17	272,221	21,907	12,640	16,013
Chicago Fire	17	272,043	20,124	11,196	16,003
Colorado Rapids	17	266,168	18,597	10,439	15,657
Total	340	7,335,053	64,358	10,035	21,574

=== Highest attendances ===
Regular season

Rank	Home team	Score	Away team	Attendance	Date	Stadium
1	Seattle Sounders FC	2–1	Portland Timbers	64,358	August 30, 2015	CenturyLink Field
2	Orlando City SC	1–1	New York City FC	62,510	March 8, 2015	Citrus Bowl
3	Seattle Sounders FC	1–1	LA Galaxy	56,097	October 4, 2015	CenturyLink Field
4	Seattle Sounders FC	3–1	Real Salt Lake	55,435	October 25, 2015	CenturyLink Field
5	Seattle Sounders FC	0–3	Vancouver Whitecaps FC	53,125	August 2, 2015	CenturyLink Field
6	San Jose Earthquakes	3–1	LA Galaxy	50,422	June 27, 2015	Stanford Stadium
7	New York City FC	1–3	New York Red Bulls	48,047	June 28, 2015	Yankee Stadium
8	New York City FC	2–0	New England Revolution	43,507	March 15, 2015	Yankee Stadium
9	Orlando City SC	2–1	New York City FC	43,179	October 16, 2015	Citrus Bowl
10	New England Revolution	0–1	Montreal Impact	42,947	October 17, 2015	Gillette Stadium

Updated to games played on October 25, 2015. Source: MLS Soccer

== Player statistics ==
=== Goals ===
Rank	Player	Club	Goals
1	(Italy) Sebastian Giovinco	Toronto FC	22
1	(Sierra Leone) Kei Kamara	Columbus Crew SC	22
3	(Republic of Ireland) Robbie Keane	LA Galaxy	20
4	(Spain) David Villa	New York City FC	18
5	(Canada) Cyle Larin	Orlando City SC	17
5	(England) Bradley Wright-Phillips	New York Red Bulls	17
7	(United States) Chris Wondolowski	San Jose Earthquakes	16
7	(Nigeria) Fanendo Adi	Portland Timbers	16
9	(Nigeria) Obafemi Martins	Seattle Sounders FC	15
10	(United States) Jozy Altidore	Toronto FC	13

=== Hat-tricks ===
Player	Club	Against	Result	Date
(Republic of Ireland) Robbie Keane	LA Galaxy	Toronto FC	4–0	July 4
(Italy) Sebastian Giovinco	Toronto FC	New York City FC	4–4	July 12
(Republic of Ireland) Robbie Keane	LA Galaxy	San Jose Earthquakes	5–2	July 17
(Canada) Cyle Larin	Orlando City SC	New York City FC	3–5	July 26
(Italy) Sebastian Giovinco	Toronto FC	Orlando City SC	4–1	August 5
(Ivory Coast) Didier Drogba	Montreal Impact	Chicago Fire	4–3	September 5
(Canada) Cyle Larin	Orlando City SC	New York Red Bulls	5–2	September 25

=== Assists ===
Rank	Player	Club	Assists
1	(Italy) Sebastian Giovinco	Toronto FC	16
2	(United States) Benny Feilhaber	Sporting Kansas City	15
2	(Argentina) Cristian Maidana	Philadelphia Union	15
4	(United States) Sacha Kljestan	New York Red Bulls	14
5	(United States) Ethan Finlay	Columbus Crew SC	13
6	(Argentina) Javier Morales	Real Salt Lake	11
7	(United States) Brad Davis	Houston Dynamo	10
7	(Argentina) Mauro Díaz	FC Dallas	10
7	(United States) Lee Nguyen	New England Revolution	10
7	(United States) Clint Dempsey	Seattle Sounders FC	10

=== Clean sheets ===
Rank	Player	Club	Clean sheets
1	(Ghana) Adam Kwarasey	Portland Timbers	13
1	(Denmark) David Ousted	Vancouver Whitecaps FC	13
3	(United States) David Bingham	San Jose Earthquakes	12
4	(Switzerland) Stefan Frei	Seattle Sounders FC	10
5	(United States) Evan Bush	Montreal Impact	9
5	(United States) Luis Robles	New York Red Bulls	9
7	(United States) Bill Hamid	D.C. United	8
7	(United States) Clint Irwin	Colorado Rapids	8
7	(United States) Tim Melia	Sporting Kansas City	8
7	(United States) Nick Rimando	Real Salt Lake	8
7	(United States) Bobby Shuttleworth	New England Revolution	8

== Awards ==
=== Individual awards ===
Award	Player	Club
Most Valuable Player	(Italy) Sebastian Giovinco	Toronto FC
Defender of the Year	(France) Laurent Ciman	Montreal Impact
Goalkeeper of the Year	(United States) Luis Robles	New York Red Bulls
Coach of the Year	(United States) Jesse Marsch	New York Red Bulls
Rookie of the Year	(Canada) Cyle Larin	Orlando City SC
Newcomer of the Year	(Italy) Sebastian Giovinco	Toronto FC
Comeback Player of the Year	(United States) Tim Melia	Sporting Kansas City
Golden Boot	(Italy) Sebastian Giovinco	Toronto FC
Fair Play Award	(United States) Darlington Nagbe	Portland Timbers
Humanitarian of the Year	(Sierra Leone) Kei Kamara	Columbus Crew SC
Goal of the Year	(Hungary) Krisztián Németh	Sporting Kansas City
Save of the Year	(Ghana) Adam Kwarasey	Portland Timbers

=== Best XI ===
Goalkeeper	Defenders	Midfielders	Forwards
(United States) Luis Robles, Red Bulls	(Belgium) Laurent Ciman, Montreal (United States) Matt Hedges, Dallas (Costa Rica) Kendall Waston, Vancouver	(United States) Ethan Finlay, Columbus (United States) Dax McCarty, Red Bulls (United States) Benny Feilhaber, Sporting KC (Colombia) Fabian Castillo, Dallas	(Italy) Sebastian Giovinco, Toronto (Sierra Leone) Kei Kamara, Columbus (Republic of Ireland) Robbie Keane, LA Galaxy

=== Player of the Month ===
Month	Player	Club	Stats
March	(Uruguay) Octavio Rivero	Vancouver Whitecaps FC	3G
April	(United States) Benny Feilhaber	Sporting Kansas City	2G, 3A
May	(Hungary) Krisztián Németh	Sporting Kansas City	3G, 2A
June	(Denmark) David Ousted	Vancouver Whitecaps FC	30SV, 4GA
July	(Italy) Sebastian Giovinco	Toronto FC	5G, 3A
August	(Italy) Sebastian Giovinco	Toronto FC	4G, 3A
September	(Ivory Coast) Didier Drogba	Montreal Impact	7G, 1A
October	(Ivory Coast) Didier Drogba	Montreal Impact	4G

=== Weekly awards ===
Week	MLS Player of the Week		Goal of the Week		MLS Save of the Week	
Week	Player	Club	Player	Club	Player	Club
Week 1	(United States) Jozy Altidore	Toronto FC	(United States) Clint Dempsey	Seattle Sounders FC	(United States) Nick Rimando	Real Salt Lake
Week 2	(Spain) David Villa	New York City FC	(Switzerland) Innocent Emeghara	San Jose Earthquakes	(United States) Tyler Deric	Houston Dynamo
Week 3	(England) Bradley Wright-Phillips	New York Red Bulls	(Uruguay) Octavio Rivero	Vancouver Whitecaps FC	(United States) Tyler Deric	Houston Dynamo
Week 4	(United States) Kelyn Rowe	New England Revolution	(United States) Jack McInerney	Montreal Impact	(United States) Tyler Deric	Houston Dynamo
Week 5	(Scotland) Shaun Maloney	Chicago Fire	(Argentina) Javier Morales	Real Salt Lake	(United States) Brek Shea	Orlando City SC
Week 6	(Panama) Jaime Penedo	LA Galaxy	(United States) Dillon Serna	Colorado Rapids	(United States) Nick Rimando	Real Salt Lake
Week 7	(Colombia) Fabián Castillo	FC Dallas	(Nigeria) Obafemi Martins	Seattle Sounders FC	(Ghana) Adam Kwarasey	Portland Timbers
Week 8	(United States) Ethan Finlay	Columbus Crew SC	(United States) Benny Feilhaber	Sporting Kansas City	(United States) Jeff Attinella	Real Salt Lake
Week 9	(Colombia) Fabián Castillo	FC Dallas	(Nigeria) Obafemi Martins	Seattle Sounders FC	(Switzerland) Stefan Frei	Seattle Sounders FC
Week 10	(England) Bradley Wright-Phillips	New York Red Bulls	(Argentina) Diego Valeri	Portland Timbers	(Denmark) David Ousted	Vancouver Whitecaps FC
Week 11	(United States) Chad Barrett	Seattle Sounders FC	(United States) Devon Sandoval	Real Salt Lake	(United States) Steve Clark	Columbus Crew SC
Week 12	(Sierra Leone) Kei Kamara	Columbus Crew SC	(England) Dom Dwyer	Sporting Kansas City	(United States) Evan Bush	Montreal Impact
Week 13	(Italy) Sebastian Giovinco	Toronto FC	(Guatemala) Marco Pappa	Seattle Sounders FC	(Switzerland) Stefan Frei	Seattle Sounders FC
Week 14	(Italy) Sebastian Giovinco	Toronto FC	(United States) Thomas McNamara	New York City FC	(United States) Andrew Dykstra	D.C. United
Week 15	(Spain) David Villa	New York City FC	(Uruguay) Diego Fagúndez	New England Revolution	(Switzerland) Stefan Frei	Seattle Sounders FC
Week 16	(United States) Gyasi Zardes	LA Galaxy	(Argentina) Matías Pérez García	San Jose Earthquakes	(Denmark) David Ousted	Vancouver Whitecaps FC
Week 17	(Nigeria) Fanendo Adi	Portland Timbers	(Colombia) Olmes Garcia	Real Salt Lake	(Denmark) David Ousted	Vancouver Whitecaps FC
Week 18	(Republic of Ireland) Robbie Keane	LA Galaxy	(England) Tyrone Mears	Seattle Sounders FC	(Denmark) David Ousted	Vancouver Whitecaps FC
Week 19	(Italy) Sebastian Giovinco	Toronto FC	(Italy) Marco Donadel	Montreal Impact	(United States) Evan Bush	Montreal Impact
Week 20	(Republic of Ireland) Robbie Keane	LA Galaxy	(Argentina) Javier Morales	Real Salt Lake	(United States) Tyler Deric	Houston Dynamo
Week 21	(Canada) Cyle Larin	Orlando City SC	(United States) Benny Feilhaber	Sporting Kansas City	(United States) Jeff Attinella	Real Salt Lake
Week 22	(Norway) Pa Modou Kah	Vancouver Whitecaps FC	(United States) Taylor Kemp	D.C. United	(United States) Jeff Attinella	Real Salt Lake
Week 23	(Sierra Leone) Kei Kamara	Columbus Crew SC	(Italy) Sebastian Giovinco	Toronto FC	(United States) Luis Robles	New York Red Bulls
Week 24	(Brazil) Paulo Nagamura	Sporting Kansas City	(Nigeria) Obafemi Martins	Seattle Sounders FC	(Ghana) Adam Kwarasey	Portland Timbers
Week 25	(Republic of Ireland) Robbie Keane	LA Galaxy	(Uruguay) Cristian Techera	Vancouver Whitecaps FC	(Switzerland) Stefan Frei	Seattle Sounders FC
Week 26	(England) Bradley Wright-Phillips	New York Red Bulls	(England) Bradley Wright-Phillips	New York Red Bulls	(Switzerland) Stefan Frei	Seattle Sounders FC
Week 27	(Ivory Coast) Didier Drogba	Montreal Impact	(Ivory Coast) Didier Drogba	Montreal Impact	(Switzerland) Stefan Frei	Seattle Sounders FC
Week 28	(Sierra Leone) Kei Kamara	Columbus Crew SC	(Hungary) Krisztián Németh	Sporting Kansas City	(United States) Nick Rimando	Real Salt Lake
Week 29	(United States) Benny Feilhaber	Sporting Kansas City	(Mexico) Gonzalo Pineda	Seattle Sounders FC	(United States) Luis Robles	New York Red Bulls
Week 30	(Ivory Coast) Didier Drogba	Montreal Impact	(Ivory Coast) Didier Drogba	Montreal Impact	(United States) Nick Rimando	Real Salt Lake
Week 31	(United States) Tim Melia	Sporting Kansas City	(Hungary) Krisztián Németh	Sporting Kansas City	(United States) Luis Robles	New York Red Bulls
Week 32	None awarded					
Week 33	(Nigeria) Fanendo Adi	Portland Timbers	(Argentina) Ignacio Piatti	Montreal Impact	(United States) Luis Robles	New York Red Bulls
Week 34	(United States) Darlington Nagbe	Portland Timbers	(United States) Darlington Nagbe	Portland Timbers	(United States) Evan Bush	Montreal Impact

== Player transfers ==
=== Allocation ranking ===
The allocation ranking was the mechanism used to determine which MLS club has first priority to acquire a U.S. National Team player who signs with MLS after playing abroad, or a former MLS player who returns to the league after having gone to a club abroad for a transfer fee.

MLS streamlined the allocation mechanism in the middle of 2015 season. Effective on May 1, 2015, the allocation ranking is the mechanism used to determine which MLS club has first priority to acquire a player who is in MLS allocation list. MLS allocation list contains select U.S. National Team players and players transferred outside of MLS garnering a transfer fee of at least $500,000. The allocations will be ranked in reverse order of finish for the 2014 season, taking playoff performance into account.

Once the club uses its allocation ranking to acquire a player, it drops to the bottom of the list. A ranking can be traded provided that part of the compensation received in return is another club's ranking. At all times each club is assigned one ranking. The rankings reset at the end of each MLS season.

Original ranking	Final ranking	Club	Date allocation used (rank on that date)	Player signed	Previous club	Ref
20	1	LA Galaxy†				
6	2	Chicago Fire				
7	3	Houston Dynamo				
9	4	Philadelphia Union				
10	5	Portland Timbers				
11	6	Sporting Kansas City				
12	7	Vancouver Whitecaps FC				
13	8	Columbus Crew SC				
14	9	FC Dallas				
15	10	Real Salt Lake				
3	11	Montreal Impact‡				
18	12	Seattle Sounders FC				
19	13	New England Revolution				
5	14	Colorado Rapids†				
1	15	New York City FC	January 13, 2015 (1)	(United States) Mix Diskerud	(Norway) Rosenborg	
8	16	Toronto FC	January 16, 2015 (6)	(United States) Jozy Altidore	(England) Sunderland	
17	17	New York Red Bulls‡	January 28, 2015 (1)	(United States) Sacha Kljestan	(Belgium) Anderlecht	
2	18	Orlando City SC♯	December 19, 2014 (2)	(United States) Brek Shea	(England) Stoke City	
2	18	Orlando City SC♯	February 2, 2015 (17)	(United States) Eric Avila	(Mexico) Santos Laguna	
16	19	D.C. United	February 10, 2015 (12)	(United States) Michael Farfan	(Mexico) Cruz Azul	
4	20	San Jose Earthquakes	July 17, 2015 (1)	(United States) Marc Pelosi	(England) Liverpool U-21	

^{†On January 15, 2015, LA Galaxy acquired the then-number 3 allocation ranking (original ranking number 5) and allocation money from Colorado Rapids in exchange for the then-number 18 allocation ranking (original ranking number 20), Marcelo Sarvas, and an international roster slot.}

^{‡On January 27, 2015, New York Red Bulls acquired the then-number 1 allocation ranking (original ranking number 3) and Felipe from Montreal Impact in exchange for the then-number 14 allocation ranking (original ranking number 17), Ambroise Oyongo, Eric Alexander, allocation money, and an international roster slot for the 2015 season.}

^{♯ On December 19, 2014, Orlando used its original ranking to acquire Shea. Orlando used their allocation a second time when 16 teams passed and they picked Avila with the then-number 17 allocation ranking.}
