= Jesse Marsch =

American soccer coach (born 1973)

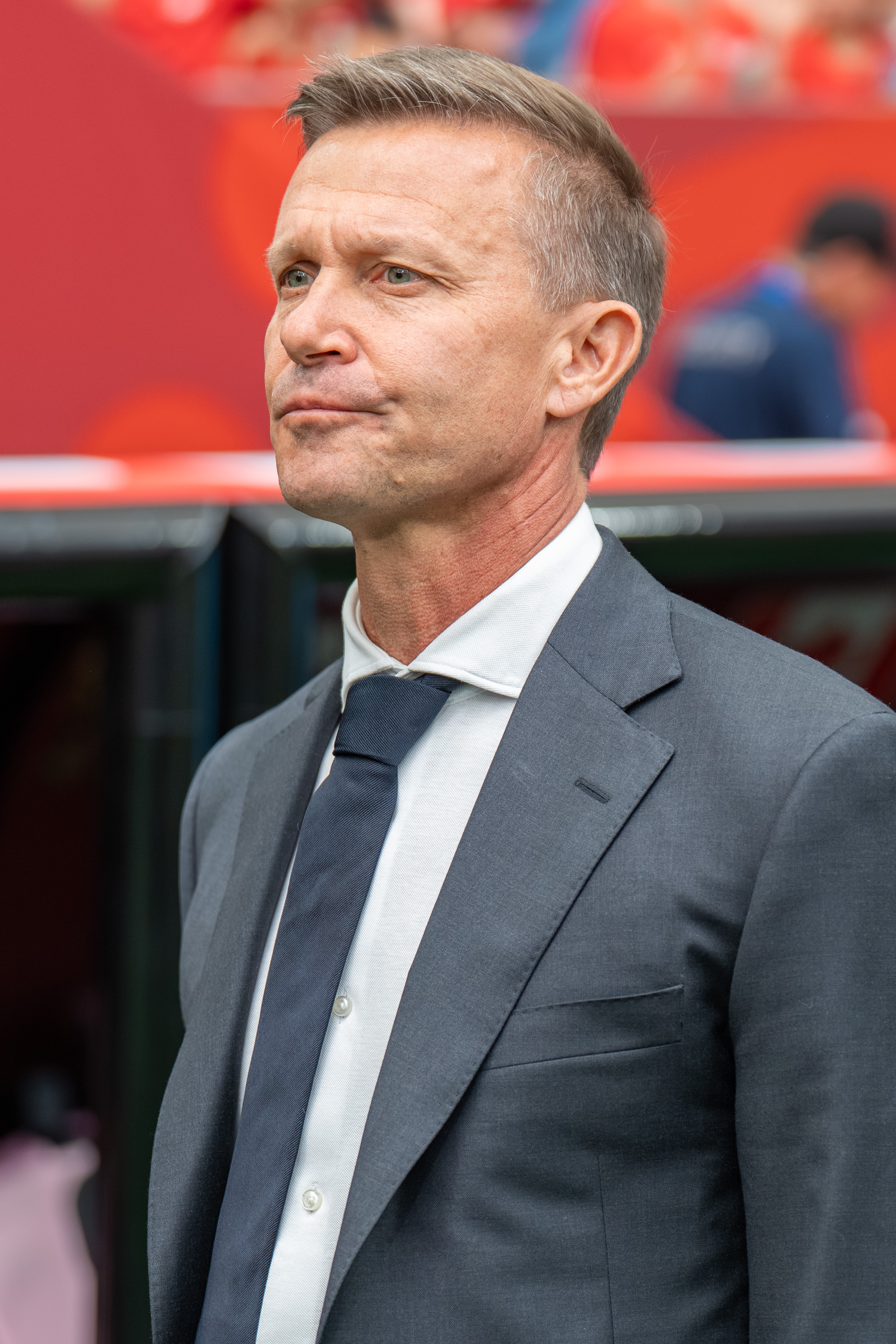
- Marsch in 2026

Personal information
- Birth name: Jesse Alan Marsch
- Date of birth: November 8, 1973 (age 53)
- Place of birth: Racine, Wisconsin, U.S.
- Height: 5 ft 11 in (1.80 m)
- Position: Midfielder

Team information
- Current team: Canada (head coach)

College career
Years	Team	Apps	(Gls)
1992–1995	Princeton Tigers		

Senior career*
Years	Team	Apps	(Gls)
1996–1997	D.C. United	15	(4)
1998–2005	Chicago Fire	200	(19)
2006–2009	Chivas USA	106	(8)
Total		321	(31)

International career
2001–2007	United States	2	(0)

Managerial career
- 2011–2012: Montreal Impact
- 2015–2018: New York Red Bulls
- 2019–2021: Red Bull Salzburg
- 2021: RB Leipzig
- 2022–2023: Leeds United
- 2024–: Canada
Medal record
Men's soccer
Representing Canada (as head coach)
CONCACAF Nations League
Third place	2025 United States
- * Club domestic league appearances and goals

Jesse Alan Marsch (/ˈdʒɛsi ˈmɑːrʃ/ JESS-ee MARSH; born November 8, 1973) is an American professional soccer coach and former player who is the head coach of the Canada men's national team. Marsch played 14 seasons as a midfielder in Major League Soccer (MLS) with D.C. United, Chicago Fire, and Chivas USA, winning three league titles and four U.S. Open Cup titles, as well as earning two caps for the United States national team.

In 2010, Marsch retired from his playing career and became a coach, first serving as an assistant with the U.S. national team under Bob Bradley that reached the last 16 of the 2010 FIFA World Cup in South Africa. He then became the inaugural head coach of the Montreal Impact upon its entry to MLS in 2012. In 2015, after a year-long stint as the assistant coach for his alma mater, the Princeton Tigers, Marsch was hired as head coach of the New York Red Bulls and stayed in the role through the first half of the 2018 MLS season. In his first year coaching the team, the Red Bulls won the Supporters' Shield and Marsch was named MLS Coach of the Year. He holds the record for most wins by a coach in franchise history.

In 2018, Marsch was appointed as an assistant coach at German Bundesliga club RB Leipzig under Ralf Rangnick; the team placed third in the league, was runner-up in the German Cup, and competed in the UEFA Europa League. The following season, Marsch was appointed the successor to Marco Rose as coach of Red Bull Salzburg in the Austrian Bundesliga; he led the club to a league and cup double in two consecutive seasons, as Salzburg made successive Champions League group stage appearances for the first time in club history. He returned to RB Leipzig as club coach for the 2021–22 season, leaving by mutual consent in December and joining Leeds United in February. He was sacked by Leeds in February 2023 and became coach of the Canadian national team in May 2024, where he subsequently led the team to finishing fourth place at the 2024 Copa América.

== Playing career ==
=== College ===
Marsch played college soccer for Princeton University, where he was an All-American in 1995 after scoring 16 goals as a midfielder and forward.

=== Professional ===
Marsch was drafted by D.C. United (their assistant coach was his coach at Princeton, Bob Bradley) in the third round of the 1996 MLS College Draft. Marsch spent the next two seasons with D.C. United, but played in only 15 games. D.C. assistant coach Bob Bradley, named to lead the expansion Chicago Fire, signed Marsch soon after the Expansion Draft in exchange for A. J. Wood and a second-round pick in the 1998 College Draft. Marsch immediately became a regular in Chicago and remained a mainstay in their lineup through 2005. He helped the Fire to the 1998 MLS Cup, giving him three league championships in three seasons. While with Chicago, he also won the U.S. Open Cup in 1998, 2000 and 2003.

After the 2005 season, Marsch was transferred to Chivas USA, where Bradley was then coaching. At the time, he left the Fire as the club's all-time leader in regular season games played with 200 (he now sits sixth behind C. J. Brown, Logan Pause, Gonzalo Segares, Zach Thornton and Chris Armas). Marsch is one of three players to have played in each of the first 14 seasons of Major League Soccer. On February 5, 2010, he announced his retirement after four seasons with Chivas to enter coaching.

=== International ===
Marsch received two caps with the United States national team. His first came as a substitute in a scoreless World Cup qualifier tie away to Trinidad and Tobago on November 11, 2001; the other came on June 2, 2007, in a 4–1 friendly win against China in San Jose, California.

== Coaching career ==
=== Early career ===
Following his retirement, Marsch was hired as an assistant to his former college and club coach Bob Bradley with the United States men's national team. Marsch remained with the U.S. program until Bradley's dismissal in July 2011.

In August 2011, Marsch was unveiled as the first head coach of Major League Soccer expansion franchise Montreal Impact, starting play in 2012. In their first MLS game on March 10, the team lost 2–0 at fellow Canadians Vancouver Whitecaps. The club finished in 12th place with 42 points. After that one season, Marsch left the club in November 2012. Though team management had been emphatic about their satisfaction with Marsch's work, the differences in coaching philosophies between Marsch and the management of the club led to an "amicable" split.

=== New York Red Bulls ===
In January 2015, Marsch was named head coach of New York Red Bulls, replacing Mike Petke. In his first season at the helm, Marsch led New York to the MLS Supporters' Shield and a club record 18 league victories and 60 points and was named the MLS Coach of the Year. After a successful start to his career, the Red Bulls extended his contract in June 2016, offering Marsch a multi-year deal.

In January 2017, Marsch was linked to taking over for Óscar García as the manager of Austrian club Red Bull Salzburg. However, both New York Red Bulls and Red Bull Salzburg denied the reports. In July 2018, Marsch left the Red Bulls as the coach with the most wins in the club's history, with a record of 75–32–44. Chris Armas followed as new head coach.

=== Assistant at RB Leipzig ===
Marsch became assistant to RB Leipzig head coach Ralf Rangnick for the 2018–19 season, signing a two-year contract in July 2018. During Marsch's tenure as an assistant for Leipzig, he was tasked with organizing the team's training sessions and preparing them for opponents. Marsch helped lead them to the group stage of the UEFA Europa League, where the team finished third in their group and bowed out of the competition. He further helped Rangnick lead the team to third place in the team's Bundesliga campaign, and to the final of the DFB-Pokal before falling to Bayern Munich in the final. Marsch ultimately left the team after one season to replace Marco Rose as coach of Leipzig's sister club Red Bull Salzburg.

=== Red Bull Salzburg ===
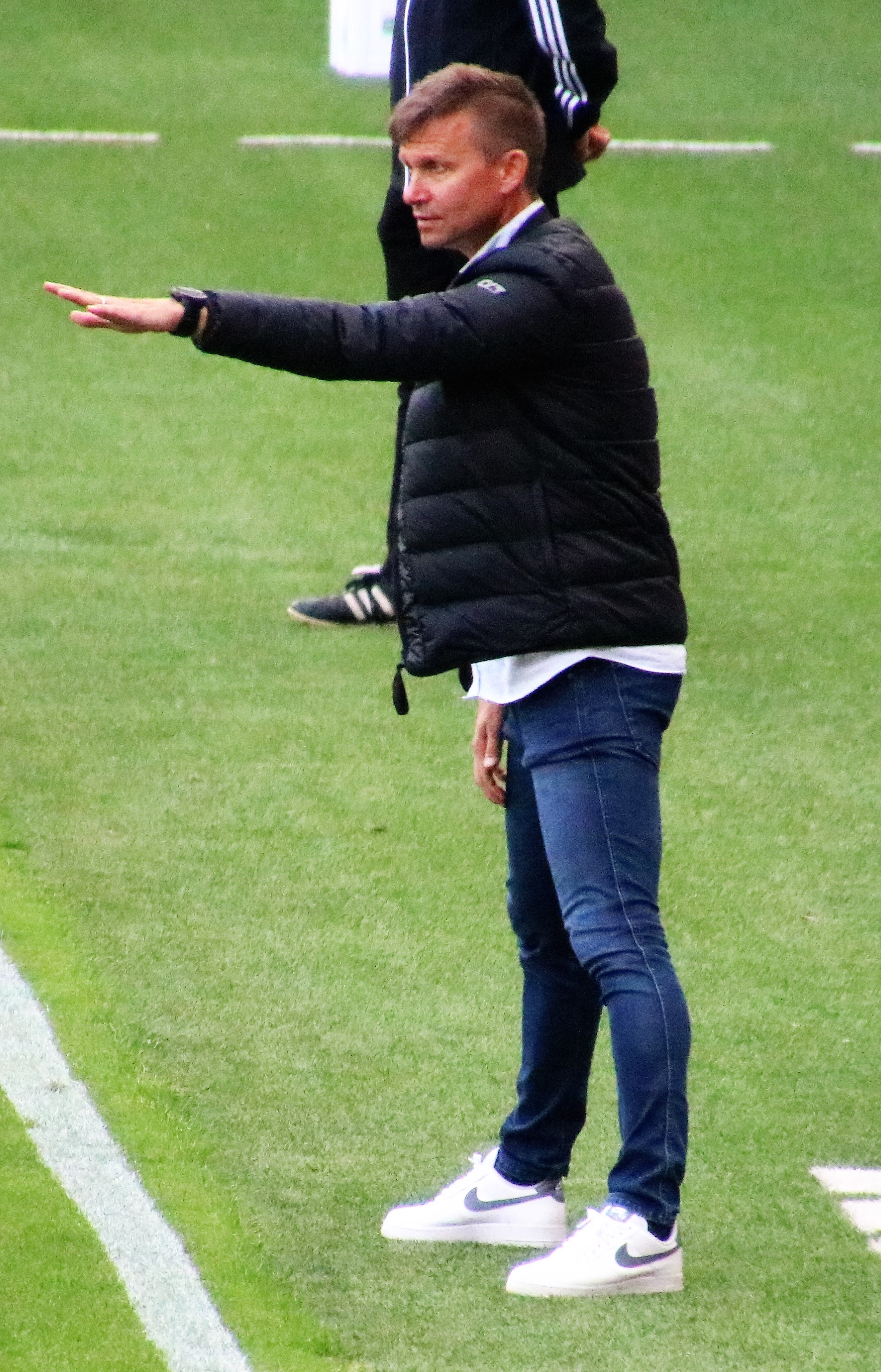
Marsch as Red Bull Salzburg coach in May 2021

Marsch was officially presented as head coach of Red Bull Salzburg on June 6, 2019. In his first season in charge, Marsch led Salzburg to winning the double. The team won the Austrian Bundesliga by winning 68.75% of their games; 12 points ahead of second place Rapid Wien making Marsch the first American coach to win a top flight league title in Europe. The team also won the Austrian Cup 5–0 against Austria Lustenau.

During the 2020–21 season, Marsch led Salzburg to their third successive cup win, Marsch's second as coach, in a 3–0 win against LASK. Salzburg also won the Bundesliga, making it two doubles in a row.

=== RB Leipzig ===
Marsch was announced as the new head coach of RB Leipzig starting from the 2021–22 season, replacing Julian Nagelsmann. Marsch won his first competitive match as Leipzig head coach 4–0 against SV Sandhausen in the DFB-Pokal. Leipzig then lost their season's opening Bundesliga match 1–0 to Mainz 05. Marsch won his first Bundesliga match against VfB Stuttgart on matchday two. Under Marsch, Leipzig lost their opening 2021–22 UEFA Champions League fixture 6–3 to Manchester City. On December 5, 2021, Marsch and Leipzig announced that they had mutually agreed to part ways. He finished with a record of seven wins, four draws and six losses.

=== Leeds United ===
On February 28, 2022, Marsch was appointed as head coach of Premier League side Leeds United and signed a three-year deal following the departure of Marcelo Bielsa. He was the third American national to manage in the Premier League, after Bob Bradley and German-born David Wagner. The British press remarked that Marsch would have to combat prejudiced attitudes toward American soccer coaches.

In Marsch's first game as Leeds coach, the team lost 1–0 at Leicester City on March 5; they won at the third attempt eight days later, 2–1 at home to Norwich City. On May 22, Marsch guided Leeds to a 2–1 win away at Brentford to help the club avoid relegation in 17th position; it was the first time since 2011 that a team survived despite being in the relegation zone at the start of the final day.

Leeds only managed to pick up six points in their first 11 games of the 2022–23 season. In their 12th game, against title contenders Liverpool, Marsch guided Leeds to a 2–1 win away from home, their first win at Anfield since 2001 and becoming the first team to defeat Liverpool there since Fulham in 2020–21. Leeds continued to struggle and only managed six points in their next eight games, which led to Marsch being dismissed on February 6, 2023, with the club sitting 17th in the table. The club were subsequently relegated to the Championship at the end of the 2022–23 season.

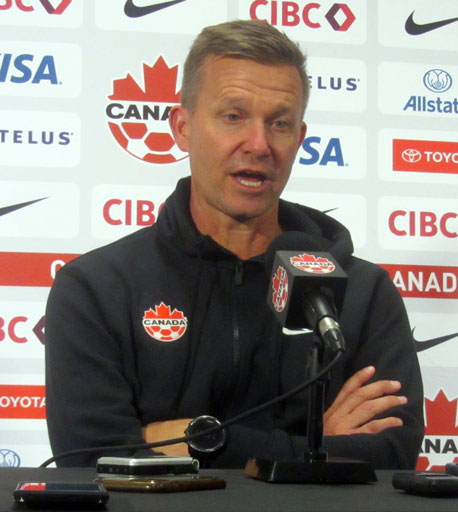
Marsch with Canada in 2024

=== Canada ===
On May 13, 2024, Marsch was appointed as head coach of the Canada men's national team, the first American to coach Canada. His wages are being partially subsidized by Canadian MLS clubs CF Montréal, Toronto FC and the Vancouver Whitecaps as well as donations from private parties due to the Canadian Soccer Association's financial difficulties. His contract was originally to last through the 2026 FIFA World Cup, where Canada will be a co-host.

In an April 2025 interview with DARBY, Marsch described taking the Canada job as stepping into a transition phase for the men's national team, with a young core that has moved to major European clubs and now needs leadership to turn promising talent into consistent, high-level performances ahead of the 2026 World Cup on home soil. He has said that one of his priorities is to make Canada "the people's team" by connecting the national side to communities across the country, increasing fundraising and government support, and using youth and coaching programs to unite a fragmented soccer landscape while welcoming more dual nationals into what he calls the national team's Canadian "umbrella". Marsch has emphasised that many Canadian players were still at a developmental stage for their age when he arrived, arguing that the national setup must raise standards and challenge them more, focusing on mentality, maturity and the pursuit of excellence rather than short-term trophies that do not lead to real improvement for the 2026 World Cup.

In May 2026, he signed an extension to remain head coach through the 2030 FIFA World Cup.

Marsch's debut on June 6 was a 4–0 friendly loss to the Netherlands at De Kuip, after which he said that it was important to play the best national teams to improve for the 2026 World Cup. Three days later his team drew 0–0 against the number 2 team in the FIFA Men's World Ranking, France, in Bordeaux.

At the 2024 Copa América in the United States – Canada's first entry in the CONMEBOL competition – Marsch lost 2–0 to World and South American champions Argentina in Canada's opening game, before a 1–0 win over Peru gave him the first victory of his spell. A goalless result against Chile in the final group game allowed the Canadians to advance as runners-up, before beating Venezuela on penalties in the quarterfinals. After a semifinal elimination by eventual champions Argentina, Canada contested the third place playoff against Uruguay, conceding an added-time equalizer by Luis Suárez and losing on penalties. Marsch said that despite the result, his team were ahead of where he thought they would be six weeks into his post.

After the Copa América, Marsch was linked with the national head coach job for the United States, who had fired Gregg Berhalter after a group stage elimination. Marsch said that he had no interest in the U.S. job and would never consider it unless there were changes in the United States Soccer Federation. He had previously been a candidate to replace Berhalter after the 2022 FIFA World Cup, but the latter was re-hired; Marsch criticized the USSF, saying "I wasn't treated very well" in the application process.

Prior to the 2025 CONCACAF Nations League Finals, Marsch stated that he was ashamed of President Donald Trump's calls for the United States to annex Canada and called the idea "ridiculous". Canada took third place with a 2–1 win over the United States, but Marsch was sent off for arguing with referee Katia Itzel García over two penalty claims. He was suspended for two games at the 2025 CONCACAF Gold Cup, in which Canada was eliminated in the quarter-finals after a penalty shootout loss to Guatemala.

On May 25, 2026, Canada Soccer announced that Marsch had signed a four-year contract extension to remain head coach through the 2030 FIFA World Cup.

In Canada's June 12 opening group match of the 2026 FIFA World Cup, which the country co-hosted with Mexico and United States, the team drew 1–1 against Bosnia and Herzegovina, earning their first ever World Cup point. In the following match on June 18, Canada achieved their first ever World Cup victory and clean sheet following a 6–0 win over Qatar. Following a 2–1 defeat to Switzerland in Canada's final group match on June 24, the team advanced to the knock-out stages of the World Cup for the first time in its history as runners-up of Group B. In the round of 32, Canada won their first ever knockout match after a 1–0 victory over South Africa. Canada were eliminated from the tournament following a 3–0 defeat to Morocco in the round of 16. Although Marsch was widely praised in the media for his role in leading Canada to the round of 16, he also came under some criticism in the press for using the team's injured captain and key player Alphonso Davies – who only appeared once as a substitute in the round of 32 – as a decoy throughout the tournament, despite stating that he would be fit to play in Canada's final group match and in the knock-out stages. Davies's absence in the round of 16 was cited as a negative blow for Canada, and the player's fitness struggles led Marsch's decision to include him in the World Cup squad to be questioned by some in the media.

== Personal life ==
Marsch, son of Larry Marsch, was born and raised in Racine, Wisconsin, where he attended Jerome I. Case High School. He and his wife Kim have three children – one daughter and two sons. Apart from his native English, Marsch speaks German, which he learned at age 44.

== Coaching statistics ==
As of match played November 17, 2026

Coaching record by team and tenure
Team	Nat.	From	To	Record								Ref.
Team	Nat.	From	To	G	W	D	L	GF	GA	GD	Win %	Ref.
Montreal Impact	(Canada)	August 10, 2011	November 4, 2012	36	12	7	17	45	53	−8	33.33	
New York Red Bulls	(United States)	January 7, 2015	July 6, 2018	151	75	32	44	256	175	+81	49.67	
Red Bull Salzburg	(Austria)	June 6, 2019	June 30, 2021	94	64	13	17	290	113	+177	68.09	
RB Leipzig	(Germany)	July 1, 2021	December 5, 2021	21	8	4	9	43	31	+12	38.10	
Leeds United	(England)	February 28, 2022	February 6, 2023	37	11	10	16	52	60	−8	29.73	
Canada	(Canada)	May 13, 2024	Present	41	19	14	8	58	34	+24	46.34	
Career Total				381	190	80	111	745	466	+279	49.87	

== Honors ==
=== Player ===
D.C. United

- MLS Cup: 1996, 1997
- Supporters' Shield: 1997
- U.S. Open Cup: 1996

Chicago Fire

- MLS Cup: 1998
- Supporters' Shield: 2003
- U.S. Open Cup: 1998, 2000, 2003

=== Head coach ===
New York Red Bulls

- Supporters' Shield: 2015, 2018

Red Bull Salzburg

- Austrian Bundesliga: 2019–20, 2020–21
- Austrian Cup: 2019–20, 2020–21

Individual

- MLS Coach of the Year: 2015
