= Alexander Bugera =

German footballer (born 1978)

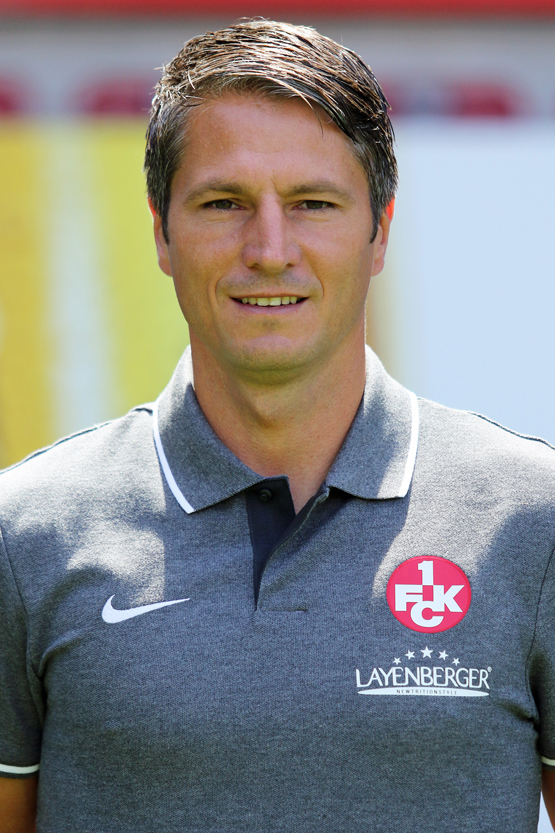
- Bugera in 2019

Personal information
- Date of birth: 8 August 1978 (age 48)
- Place of birth: Amberg, West Germany
- Height: 1.80 m (5 ft 11 in)
- Position: Left-back

Youth career
- –1986: Inter Bergsteig Amberg
- 1986–1995: 1. FC Amberg
- 1995–1997: Bayern Munich

Senior career*
Years	Team	Apps	(Gls)
1997–2003	Bayern Munich II	55	(23)
1997–2003	Bayern Munich	3	(0)
1999–2000	→ MSV Duisburg (loan)	25	(2)
2000–2002	→ SpVgg Unterhaching (loan)	32	(4)
2003–2007	MSV Duisburg	123	(13)
2007–2013	1. FC Kaiserslautern	104	(2)
2009–2015	1. FC Kaiserslautern II	60	(1)
Total		402	(45)

International career
1998–1999	Germany U-21	6	(2)

Managerial career
- 2015–2016: 1. FC Kaiserslautern U15
- 2016–20117: 1. FC Kaiserslautern U17
- 2017: 1. FC Kaiserslautern U19
- 2017–2019: 1. FC Kaiserslautern (assistant)
- 2019: 1. FC Kaiserslautern (caretaker)
- 2020–: 1. FC Kaiserslautern II
- * Club domestic league appearances and goals

Alexander Bugera (born 8 August 1978) is a German former professional footballer who played as a left-back for Bayern Munich, SpVgg Unterhaching, MSV Duisburg, 1. FC Kaiserslautern and 1. FC Kaiserslautern II. He began his career with Bayern Munich's reserve team, initially playing as a forward.

== Career ==
Bugera was born in Amberg. He came through Bayern Munich's youth team, and was promoted to the reserve team in 1997. He was the team's top scorer in the 1997–98 with nine goals, and earned a call-up to the first-team, making his debut as a substitute for Mehmet Scholl in a Bundesliga match against Werder Bremen in April 1998. He scored a further ten goals for the reserves in the first half of the following season, and made two more first-team appearances, before joining MSV Duisburg on loan in January 1999. He made thirteen appearances for Duisburg in the second half of the season, scoring once, as the club finished in a respectable 8th place in the Bundesliga. Despite having left Bayern Munich's reserves halfway through the season, he still finished as the team's top scorer, for the second year in a row.

His loan spell at Duisburg was extended by a year, but his second season with the club proved to be less successful: he only made twelve appearances (again scoring once), and Duisburg finished at the bottom of the table. He then went on loan again, joining Bayern's near-neighbours SpVgg Unterhaching.

Bugera's first season at Unterhaching was similarly disappointing – he made only seven appearances, without scoring, and suffered another relegation as the club finished 16th in the Bundesliga. He remained on loan with the club for the 2001–02 season, however, now in the 2. Bundesliga, and made 25 appearances (scoring four goals), but couldn't prevent Unterhaching from a second consecutive relegation, to the third-tier Regionalliga Süd.

Bugera returned to FC Bayern for the 2002–03 season, and went back into the reserve team where he was now a relatively experienced player alongside Philipp Lahm, Christian Lell and Bastian Schweinsteiger, who were just starting their careers. At the end of the season he left Bayern permanently to sign for MSV Duisburg, who were now in the 2. Bundesliga.

Bugera scored nine goals in his first season back at Duisburg, but over the next few years he'd move back from his position in attack, firstly into midfield, and then as a left-back. He made 33 appearances during the 2004–05 season, as Duisburg finished second, earning promotion to the Bundesliga, and 23 the following year, in which they finished bottom of the league and returned to the second tier.

Bugera was an ever-present for Duisburg in 2006–07, as they bounced straight back again, but he was to remain in the second division, joining 1. FC Kaiserslautern in July 2007. Kaiserslautern were a big name by the standards of the second tier, but Bugera's first season with the club was frustrating – he made just eleven appearances as they finished in 14th place, only surviving the drop on the last day of the season, thanks to a 3–0 win over 1. FC Köln.

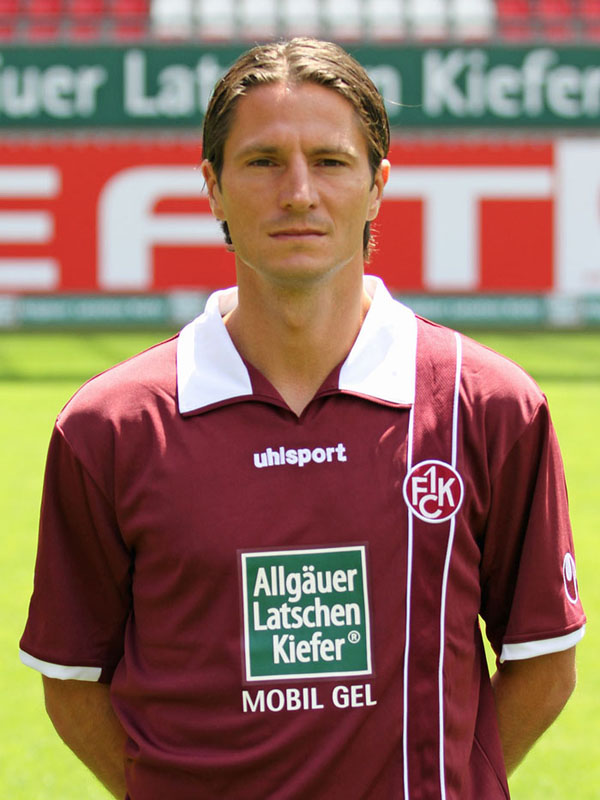
Bugera in 2011

Things got gradually better for Bugera and Kaiserslautern – in 2008–09 he made 21 appearances as the club finished seventh, and the following year he missed just one game as they won the 2. Bundesliga title and promotion back to the top-flight after a four-year absence. Their first year back at level was successful too, although Bugera was less in favour – he made 12 appearances as Lautern finished in seventh place. He made 20 appearances during the 2011–12 season, but this was a disastrous one for the club – they were adrift at the bottom of the table all season, and were relegated back to the 2. Bundesliga.

Bugera retired in the summer 2015.

== Honours ==
Bayern Munich

- Bundesliga: 1997–98
- DFB-Pokal: 1997–98
- DFB-Ligapokal: 1997, 1998
