= Alper Akçam =

German-born Turkish footballer

Personal information
- Full name: Alper Akçam
- Date of birth: 1 September 1987 (age 39)
- Place of birth: Bad Kreuznach, West Germany
- Height: 1.78 m (5 ft 10 in)
- Position: Striker

Team information
- Current team: Manisa BB

Youth career
- –2001: Bavaria Ebernburg
- 2001–2006: 1. FC Kaiserslautern

Senior career*
Years	Team	Apps	(Gls)
2006–2010	1. FC Kaiserslautern II	114	(36)
2008–2010	1. FC Kaiserslautern	4	(0)
2010–2013	Gaziantepspor	6	(0)
2013–2014	Wormatia Worms	36	(2)
2015	Wormatia Worms	6	(2)
2015–2016	Wormatia Worms	8	(4)
- * Club domestic league appearances and goals as of 13 October 2015

Alper Akçam (born 1 September 1987 in Bad Kreuznach) is a German-born Turkish footballer, who currently plays for Manisa BB.

== Career ==
Akçam made his debut on the professional league level in the 2. Bundesliga for 1. FC Kaiserslautern on 4 April 2008, when he came on as a substitute in the 67th minute in a game against TSG 1899 Hoffenheim. In summer 2010, Akçam moved to Gaziantepspor.
