= Moussa Ouattara (footballer, born 1981) =

Burkinabé footballer

Personal information
- Full name: Moussa Boureïma Ouattara
- Date of birth: 31 December 1981 (age 44)
- Place of birth: Bobo Dioulasso, Upper Volta
- Height: 1.93 m (6 ft 4 in)
- Position: Centre-back

Senior career*
| Years | Team | Apps | (Gls) |
| 1998–2002 | ASFA Yennenga | | |
| 2002–2003 | Tours | 5 | (0) |
| 2003–2005 | US Créteil | 25 | (0) |
| 2005–2006 | Legia Warsaw | 18 | (2) |
| 2006–2010 | 1. FC Kaiserslautern | 61 | (1) |
| 2010–2011 | Fortuna Köln | 2 | (0) |
| 2012–2013 | SV Schermbeck | 32 | (3) |
| 2013–2014 | DSC Wanne-Eickel | | |

International career
| 1999–2010 | Burkina Faso | 33 | (0) |
- * Club domestic league appearances and goals

Moussa Boureïma Ouattara (born 31 December 1981) is a Burkinabé former professional footballer who played as a centre-back.

== Club career ==
Ouattara was born in Bobo Dioulasso, Upper Volta. He previously played for Legia Warsaw in the Polish Ekstraklasa and then 1. FC Kaiserslautern in the German 2. Bundesliga.

== International career ==
Ouattara was a member of the Burkinabé 2004 African Nations Cup team. They finished bottom of their group in the first round of competition, failing to secure qualification for the quarter-finals.

== Honours ==
Legia Warsaw

- Ekstraklasa: 2005–06
