= Mike Petke =

American soccer player (born 1976)

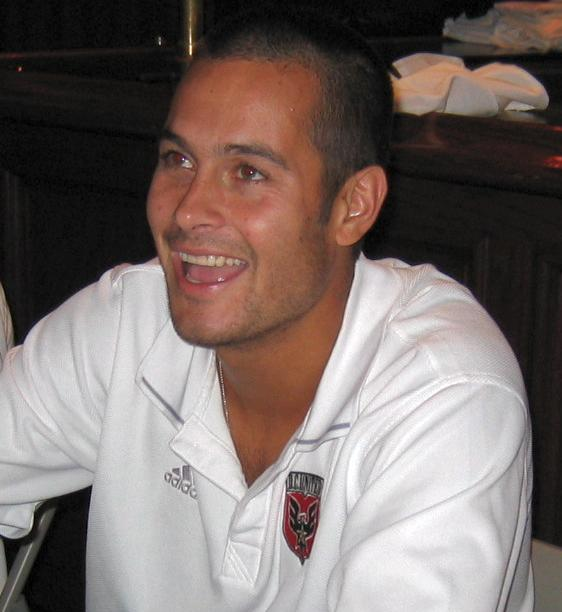
- Petke with D.C. United in 2004

Personal information
- Date of birth: January 30, 1976 (age 50)
- Place of birth: Bohemia, New York, United States
- Height: 6 ft 2 in (1.88 m)
- Position: Defender

College career
Years	Team	Apps	(Gls)
1994–1997	Southern Connecticut State		

Senior career*
Years	Team	Apps	(Gls)
1998–2002	MetroStars	134	(5)
2003–2005	D.C. United	58	(5)
2005–2008	Colorado Rapids	80	(3)
2009–2010	New York Red Bulls	35	(0)
Total		307	(13)

International career
2001–2003	United States	2	(0)

Managerial career
- 2011–2012: New York Red Bulls (assistant)
- 2012–2015: New York Red Bulls
- 2016–2017: Real Monarchs
- 2017–2019: Real Salt Lake
- * Club domestic league appearances and goals

Mike Petke (born January 30, 1976) is an American former soccer player and coach who was most recently head coach of Major League Soccer club Real Salt Lake. Prior to his tenure with Real Salt Lake, he was head coach of the New York Red Bulls, leading them to the Supporters' Shield in 2013.

== Playing career ==
=== College ===
Petke attended St. John the Baptist Diocesan High School in West Islip, New York, where he was selected as an All-American, before moving on to play college soccer in Southern Connecticut State University. In 1995, he led SCSU to the NCAA Division II National title and was named Conference Rookie of the Year. In 1997, he was named New England Collegiate Conference (NECC) Defensive Player of the Year and was a consensus NSCAA/Umbro First Team All-America selection.

=== Professional ===
Petke was drafted by the MetroStars in the first round of the 1998 MLS College Draft. He made his MLS debut on April 17, 1998, in a 1–0 win over Chicago Fire. He spent the first five years of his career with MetroStars, becoming the only constant under an ever-changing regime of coaches and players. A fan favorite, Petke ended his career as the MetroStars/Red Bulls all-time leader in games played with 169 (197 in all competitions).

Petke gained notoriety on August 20, 2000, four days after Tampa Bay Mutiny forward Mamadou Diallo broke the ribs of MetroStars goalkeeper Mike Ammann. Petke, who rarely scored goals, scored in the MetroStars win over Colorado, and unveiled a T-shirt that said August 16: Crime of the Century on the front and Revenge is Coming on the back. While such support for a fallen comrade was welcomed by teammates and MetroStars fans, it was frowned upon by the league and Petke was fined for his efforts. Diallo, however, received no disciplinary action following the injuries to Ammann.

After an outstanding season in 2000, in which Petke helped lead the club to the Eastern Division title, Petke went on a two-week trial with Bundesliga side Bayern Munich. After his trial with Bayern, another German club 1. FC Kaiserslautern offered Petke a contract, but Petke elected to remain with MetroStars.

Petke, a three-time MLS All-Star, was traded to D.C. United with a draft pick and an allocation for Eddie Pope, Jaime Moreno, and Richie Williams. He won the MLS Cup with DC during the 2004 season. Petke was then traded to Colorado Rapids in May 2005 in a three-team deal. He helped stabilize the Colorado backline and was a key player in helping the Rapids reach the Western Conference Finals in 2005. He remained a fixture in the heart of the Rapids defense for the next three years.

On November 26, 2008, the New York Red Bulls, the former MetroStars, signed Petke on waivers, and agreed to terms on a new multi-year agreement. The move brought Petke back to New York six years after leaving the MetroStars. In his first season with the Red Bulls, Petke appeared in 19 regular season matches. On March 20, 2010, Petke scored the second goal for the Red Bulls in a 3–1 victory against Santos FC, which was the first match played at the new Red Bull Arena. During the 2010 season Petke announced that he would retire at the end of the season. He concluded his last professional season appearing in 16 regular season matches, and helped New York capture its second Eastern Division regular season title. In thirteen years in MLS, Petke scored thirteen regular season goals and added four assists.

=== International ===
Petke had two caps with the U.S. national team, the first coming on June 7, 2001, against Ecuador.

Petke also captained the United States Under-21 team, and was a member of the U.S. squad that competed in the 1995 World University Games in Japan.

== Coaching career ==
After retiring from the game, Petke took a job as Manager of Business Operations with the New York Red Bulls. On January 24, 2013, after tenures as an assistant coach and then interim head coach, Petke was named as the club's head coach. In the 2013 MLS season, Petke guided the Red Bulls to their first major trophy, clinching the Supporters' Shield with a final matchday 5–2 win over the Chicago Fire.

Petke once again led the Red Bulls to relative success in the 2014 MLS season, as the team made the playoffs and advanced to the Eastern Conference Finals, losing there to the New England Revolution. Nonetheless, Petke was fired by the club in January 2015. Petke's firing was met with huge backlash by Red Bulls supporters.

After leaving the Red Bulls, Petke spent time as a color commentator for soccer on ONE World Sports, and also worked as the Director of Coaching for the New Jersey State Youth Soccer Association.

Petke was hired as head coach of Real Monarchs in the United Soccer League on December 22, 2016. Just over three months later, on March 29, 2017, Petke was named the new head coach of the Monarchs' parent club, Real Salt Lake, replacing Jeff Cassar.

On August 11, 2019, Real Salt Lake announced that it had terminated Petke's contract as head coach, following an incident between Petke and match officials during the 2019 Leagues Cup where he was accused of repeatedly using homophobic language toward the head official.

== Career statistics ==
Appearances and goals by club, season and competition
Club	Season	League			National cup (Note: Includes Open Cup.)		League cup		Continental		Total	
Club	Season	Division	Apps	Goals	Apps	Goals	Apps	Goals	Apps	Goals	Apps	Goals
New York MetroStars	1998	Major League Soccer	27	1	2	0	1	0			30	1
New York MetroStars	1999	Major League Soccer	25	1	1	0					26	1
New York MetroStars	2000	Major League Soccer	30	3	4	0	5	0			39	3
New York MetroStars	2001	Major League Soccer	25	0	1	0	3	0	4	1	33	1
New York MetroStars	2002	Major League Soccer	27	0	2	0					29	0
New York MetroStars	Total		134	5	10	0	9	0	4	1	157	6
D.C. United	2003	Major League Soccer	25	3	3	1	2	0			30	4
D.C. United	2004	Major League Soccer	26	1	1	0	4	0			31	1
D.C. United	2005	Major League Soccer	7	1							7	1
D.C. United	Total		58	5	4	1	6	0	0	0	68	6
Colorado Rapids	2005	Major League Soccer	19	0			3	0			22	0
Colorado Rapids	2006	Major League Soccer	26	0	2	0	2	0			30	0
Colorado Rapids	2007	Major League Soccer	24	1							24	1
Colorado Rapids	2008	Major League Soccer	11	2							11	2
Colorado Rapids	Total		80	3	2	0	5	0	0	10	87	3
New York Red Bulls	2009	Major League Soccer	19	0	1	1			1	0	21	1
New York Red Bulls	2010	Major League Soccer	16	0	2	0	0	0			18	0
New York Red Bulls	Total		35	0	3	1	0	0	1	0	39	1
Career total			307	13	19	2	20	0	5	1	351	16

== Coaching statistics ==
As of match played August 10, 2019

Coaching record by team and tenure
Team	Nat	From	To	Record								Ref
Team	Nat	From	To	G	W	D	L	GF	GA	GD	Win %	Ref
New York Red Bulls	(United States)	November 9, 2012	January 7, 2015	82	34	23	25	131	111	+20	41.46	
Real Monarchs	(United States)	December 22, 2016	March 29, 2017	1	1	0	0	2	1	+1	100.00	
Real Salt Lake	(United States)	March 29, 2017	August 11, 2019	95	39	16	40	145	158	−13	41.05	
Total				178	74	39	65	278	270	+8	41.57	—

== Honors ==
=== Player ===
D.C. United

- MLS Cup: 2004

Individual

- MLS All-Star: 2000

=== Coach ===
New York Red Bulls

- MLS Supporters' Shield: 2013
